= 2023 Major League Soccer season =

28th season of Major League Soccer

Major League Soccer
- Season: 2023
- Dates: February 25 – October 21 (regular season); October 25 – December 9 (playoffs)
- Teams: 29
- MLS Cup: Columbus Crew (3rd title)
- Supporters' Shield: FC Cincinnati (1st shield)
- Champions Cup (United States): FC Cincinnati; Columbus Crew; Houston Dynamo FC; Inter Miami CF; Nashville SC; New England Revolution; Orlando City SC; Philadelphia Union; St. Louis City SC
- Champions Cup (Canada): Vancouver Whitecaps FC
- Matches: 493
- Goals: 1,359 (2.76 per match)
- Top goalscorer: Denis Bouanga (20 goals)
- Best goalkeeper: Stefan Frei (14 clean sheets)
- Biggest home win: Columbus 6–1 Atlanta (March 25); Vancouver 5–0 Montréal (April 1)
- Biggest away win: Salt Lake 0–4 St. Louis (March 25)
- Highest scoring: 9 goals: St. Louis 6–3 Austin (August 20)
- Longest winning run: 6 matches: Cincinnati
- Longest unbeaten run: 10 matches: Cincinnati; Nashville
- Longest winless run: 11 matches: Miami; NYCFC; Toronto
- Longest losing run: 8 matches: Toronto
- Highest attendance: 82,110; LAG 2–1 LAFC (July 4)
- Lowest attendance: 7,417; NYCFC 3–0 TOR (September 24)
- Total attendance: 10,900,804
- Average attendance: 22,111

The 2023 Major League Soccer season was the 28th season of Major League Soccer (MLS), the top professional soccer league in the United States and Canada, and the 45th season overall of a national first-division league in the United States. The league expanded to 29 clubs following the addition of St. Louis City SC to the Western Conference, with Nashville SC moving back to the Eastern Conference.

The regular season began on February 25 and concluded on October 21; it was followed by the playoffs which commenced on October 25. The regular schedule was released on December 20, 2022. The regular season was paused from July 20 to August 19 for the month-long Leagues Cup, during which time MLS teams played Liga MX opponents.

In June 2022, Apple Inc. and MLS announced a ten-year partnership for the broadcast and streaming rights to all MLS and Leagues Cup games, as well as select MLS Next and MLS Next Pro games, on the MLS Season Pass service within the Apple TV app. Fox Sports retained linear MLS TV rights, while for the first time in league history, ESPN no longer aired matches. Univision opted to only air Leagues Cup games, thus also not broadcasting MLS regular season contests after a combined nineteen years.

For the first time since its founding, MLS qualification berths for the 2024 CONCACAF Champions Cup were not exclusively allocated to American clubs, allowing expatriated Canadian clubs an opportunity to qualify for the tournament without necessarily winning the Canadian Championship.

The season was marked by the arrival of eight-time Ballon d'Or winner Lionel Messi, who signed for Inter Miami CF during the summer, following the expiration of his contract with French club Paris Saint-Germain.

Los Angeles FC were the reigning MLS Cup champions and were the Supporters' Shield holders; Philadelphia Union were the reigning Eastern Conference champions. In their fifth season in the league, FC Cincinnati won the Supporters' Shield for the first time. The Columbus Crew won MLS Cup 2023 by defeating Los Angeles FC 2–1 at Lower.com Field in Columbus, Ohio.

== Teams ==
=== Stadiums and locations ===
Locations of teams for the 2023 Major League Soccer season
Western Conference Eastern Conference

Team	Stadium	Capacity
Atlanta United FC	Mercedes-Benz Stadium	42,500
Austin FC	Q2 Stadium	20,738
Charlotte FC	Bank of America Stadium	40,000
Chicago Fire FC	Soldier Field	24,955
FC Cincinnati	TQL Stadium	26,000
Colorado Rapids	Dick's Sporting Goods Park	18,061
Columbus Crew	Lower.com Field	20,371
FC Dallas	Toyota Stadium	20,500
D.C. United	Audi Field	20,000
Houston Dynamo FC	Shell Energy Stadium	22,039
LA Galaxy	Dignity Health Sports Park	27,000
Los Angeles FC	BMO Stadium	22,000
Minnesota United FC	Allianz Field	19,400
Inter Miami CF	DRV PNK Stadium	21,000
CF Montréal	Saputo Stadium	19,619
Nashville SC	Geodis Park	30,000
New England Revolution	Gillette Stadium	20,000
New York City FC	Yankee Stadium	30,321
New York Red Bulls	Red Bull Arena	25,000
Orlando City SC	Exploria Stadium	25,500
Philadelphia Union	Subaru Park	18,500
Portland Timbers	Providence Park	25,218
Real Salt Lake	America First Field	20,213
San Jose Earthquakes	PayPal Park	18,000
Seattle Sounders FC	Lumen Field	37,722
Sporting Kansas City	Children's Mercy Park	18,467
St. Louis City SC	CityPark	22,423
Toronto FC	BMO Field	28,351
Vancouver Whitecaps FC	BC Place	22,120

1. Non-soccer specific stadium and artificially reduced capacity. Capacity may be increased to full capacity if demand requires.
2. Temporary stadium.

=== Personnel and sponsorships ===
Note: All teams use Adidas as universal kit manufacturer. As part of Apple's broadcast contract, all MLS kits included Apple TV+ as a sleeve sponsor.

Team	Head coach	Captain	Shirt sponsor	Sleeve sponsor
Atlanta United FC	(Mexico) Gonzalo Pineda	(United States) Brad Guzan	American Family Insurance	Piedmont Hospital
Austin FC	(United States) Josh Wolff	(Argentina) Sebastián Driussi	Yeti	Netspend
Charlotte FC	(Italy) Christian Lattanzio	(England) Ashley Westwood	Ally	Centene
Chicago Fire FC	(United States) Frank Klopas (interim)	(Germany) Rafael Czichos	—	Hyundai
FC Cincinnati	(United States) Pat Noonan	(Argentina) Luciano Acosta	Mercy Health	Kroger
Colorado Rapids	(Scotland) Chris Little (interim)	(England) Jack Price	UCHealth	—
Columbus Crew	(France) Wilfried Nancy	(United States) Darlington Nagbe	Nationwide	Tipico
D.C. United	(France) Frédéric Brillant (interim)	(United States) Steve Birnbaum	XDC Network	—
FC Dallas	(Spain) Nico Estévez	(United States) Paul Arriola	Children's Health (home) UT Southwestern (away)	AdvoCare
Houston Dynamo FC	(United States) Ben Olsen	(Mexico) Héctor Herrera	MD Anderson	—
Inter Miami CF	(Argentina) Gerardo Martino	(Argentina) Lionel Messi	XBTO	Fracht Group
LA Galaxy	(United States) Greg Vanney	(Mexico) Javier Hernández	Herbalife	Honey
Los Angeles FC	(United States) Steve Cherundolo	(Mexico) Carlos Vela	Flex	Ford
Minnesota United FC	(England) Sean McAuley (interim)	(United States) Wil Trapp	Target	Allianz
CF Montréal	(Argentina) Hernán Losada	(Canada) Samuel Piette	Bank of Montreal	Telus
Nashville SC	(England) Gary Smith	(United States) Walker Zimmerman	Renasant Bank	Hyundai
New England Revolution	(United States) Clint Peay (interim)	(Spain) Carles Gil	UnitedHealth	Santander
New York City FC	(England) Nick Cushing	(Brazil) Thiago Martins	Etihad Airways	Dude Wipes
New York Red Bulls	(United States) Troy Lesesne	(United States) Sean Nealis	Red Bull	OANDA
Orlando City SC	(Colombia) Óscar Pareja	(Uruguay) Mauricio Pereyra	Orlando Health	Exploria
Philadelphia Union	(United States) Jim Curtin	(United States) Alejandro Bedoya	Bimbo Bakeries USA	—
Portland Timbers	(United States) Miles Joseph (interim)	(Colombia) Diego Chará	Alaska Airlines	TikTok
Real Salt Lake	(United States) Pablo Mastroeni	(Croatia) Damir Kreilach	LifeVantage	—
San Jose Earthquakes	(United States) Luchi Gonzalez	(United States) Jackson Yueill	Intermedia	PayPal
Seattle Sounders FC	(United States) Brian Schmetzer	(Switzerland) Stefan Frei	Providence	Emerald Queen Casino
Sporting Kansas City	(United States) Peter Vermes	(Scotland) Johnny Russell	Compass Minerals	—
St. Louis City SC	(South Africa) Bradley Carnell	(Switzerland) Roman Bürki	Purina	BJC HealthCare
Toronto FC	(England) John Herdman	(United States) Michael Bradley	Bank of Montreal	GE Appliances
Vancouver Whitecaps FC	(Italy) Vanni Sartini	(Canada) Russell Teibert	Telus	—

=== Coaching changes ===
Team	Outgoing coach	Manner of departure	Date of vacancy	Position in table	Incoming coach	Date of appointment
Columbus Crew	(United States) Caleb Porter	Fired	October 10, 2022	Pre-season	(France) Wilfried Nancy	December 6, 2022
Houston Dynamo FC	(United States) Kenny Bundy (interim)	End of interim period	November 8, 2022	Pre-season	(United States) Ben Olsen	November 8, 2022
San Jose Earthquakes	(Spain) Alex Covelo (interim)	End of interim period	January 3, 2023	Pre-season	(United States) Luchi Gonzalez	January 3, 2023
CF Montréal	(France) Wilfried Nancy	Signed by Columbus Crew	December 6, 2022	Pre-season	(Argentina) Hernán Losada	December 21, 2022
New York Red Bulls	(Austria) Gerhard Struber	Mutual consent	May 8, 2023	15th in East, 27th overall	(United States) Troy Lesesne	May 8, 2023
Chicago Fire FC	(Saint Vincent and the Grenadines) Ezra Hendrickson	Mutual consent	May 8, 2023	14th in East, 25th overall	(United States) Frank Klopas (interim)	May 8, 2023
Inter Miami CF	(England) Phil Neville	Fired	June 1, 2023	15th in East, 27th overall	(Argentina) Javier Morales (interim)	June 1, 2023
Toronto FC	(United States) Bob Bradley	Fired	June 26, 2023	14th in East, 26th overall	(Canada) Terry Dunfield (interim)	June 26, 2023
Inter Miami CF	(Argentina) Javier Morales (interim)	End of interim period	June 28, 2023	15th in East, 27th overall	(Argentina) Gerardo Martino	June 28, 2023
Portland Timbers	(Venezuela) Giovanni Savarese	Fired	August 21, 2023	12th in West, 24th overall	(United States) Miles Joseph (interim)	August 21, 2023
Colorado Rapids	(United States) Robin Fraser	Fired	September 5, 2023	14th in West, 29th overall	(Scotland) Chris Little (interim)	September 5, 2023
New England Revolution	(United States) Bruce Arena	Resigned	September 9, 2023	2nd in East, 3rd Overall	(United States) Richie Williams (interim)	September 9, 2023
New England Revolution	(United States) Richie Williams (interim)	Mutual consent	September 12, 2023	2nd in East, 3rd Overall	(United States) Clint Peay (interim)	September 12, 2023
Toronto FC	(Canada) Terry Dunfield (interim)	End of interim period	September 30, 2023	15th in East, 29th overall	(England) John Herdman	October 1, 2023
Minnesota United FC	(England) Adrian Heath	Fired	October 6, 2023	12th in West, 21st overall	(England) Sean McAuley (interim)	October 6, 2023
D.C. United	(England) Wayne Rooney	Mutual consent	October 7, 2023	9th in East, 23rd overall	(France) Frédéric Brillant (interim)	October 7, 2023

== Regular season ==
=== Format ===
Each of the league's 29 teams played 34 matches—17 at home and 17 away games; the frequency of opponents was different for each conference due to the unequal number of teams. The 15 Eastern Conference teams played two matches against every other team in the same conference and one match each against six Western Conference teams. The 14 Western Conference teams faced each other twice as well as an additional one or two matches against an intra-conference team; they had one match each against either six or seven Eastern Conference teams.

The regular season began on February 25 and culminated with Decision Day on October 21, where all teams (except D.C.) played each other in simultaneous intra-conference matches. The season was paused for the 2023 Leagues Cup from July 21 to August 19 as well as FIFA international windows in October and November; the June and September international windows had a partial pause, with 13 clubs electing to continue playing during them. The majority of matches were played on Wednesdays and Saturdays at 7:30 p.m. local time as part of the Apple TV+ streaming contract. The 2023 MLS All-Star Game took place on July 19, 2023, at Audi Field in Washington, D.C. between the MLS All-Stars and Arsenal.

The MLS Cup Playoffs expanded to nine teams per conference and a total of 24 matches. Round One in late October consisted of a best-of-three series between the top seven teams per conference as well as the winner of a wild card match played by the eighth and ninth placed teams. The Conference Semifinals, Conference Final, and MLS Cup final remained single-elimination matches hosted by the higher-seeded team in late November and early December.

The 2023 season was the first to implement a "sustenance break" for iftar for Muslim players during Ramadan in April. The break was indicated by the referee as a stoppage in play after sundown and treated as a hydration break.

=== Conference standings ===
MLS Eastern Conference table (2023)
Pos	Team	Pld	W	L	T	GF	GA	GD	Pts	Qualification
1	FC Cincinnati	34	20	5	9	57	39	+18	69	Qualification for round one and the CONCACAF Champions Cup round one
2	Orlando City SC	34	18	7	9	55	39	+16	63	Qualification for round one
3	Columbus Crew	34	16	9	9	67	46	+21	57	Qualification for round one
4	Philadelphia Union	34	15	9	10	57	41	+16	55	Qualification for round one
5	New England Revolution	34	15	9	10	58	46	+12	55	Qualification for round one
6	Atlanta United FC	34	13	9	12	66	53	+13	51	Qualification for round one
7	Nashville SC	34	13	11	10	39	32	+7	49	Qualification for round one
8	New York Red Bulls	34	11	13	10	36	39	−3	43	Qualification for the wild card round
9	Charlotte FC	34	10	11	13	45	52	−7	43	Qualification for the wild card round
10	CF Montréal	34	12	17	5	36	52	−16	41	
11	New York City FC	34	9	11	14	35	39	−4	41	
12	D.C. United	34	10	14	10	45	49	−4	40	
13	Chicago Fire FC	34	10	14	10	39	51	−12	40	
14	Inter Miami CF	34	9	18	7	41	54	−13	34	
15	Toronto FC	34	4	20	10	26	59	−33	22	

Source: MLS
Rules for classification: 1) points; 2) total wins; 3) total goal differential; 4) total goals scored; 5) fewer disciplinary points; 6) away goal differential; 7) away goals scored; 8) home goals differential; 9) home goals scored; 10) coin toss (2 clubs tied) or drawing of lots (≥3 clubs tied)

MLS Western Conference table (2023)
Pos	Team	Pld	W	L	T	GF	GA	GD	Pts	Qualification
1	St. Louis City SC	34	17	12	5	62	45	+17	56	Qualification for round one and the CONCACAF Champions Cup round one
2	Seattle Sounders FC	34	14	9	11	41	32	+9	53	Qualification for round one
3	Los Angeles FC	34	14	10	10	54	39	+15	52	Qualification for round one
4	Houston Dynamo FC	34	14	11	9	51	38	+13	51	Qualification for round one
5	Real Salt Lake	34	14	12	8	48	50	−2	50	Qualification for round one
6	Vancouver Whitecaps FC	34	12	10	12	55	48	+7	48	Qualification for round one
7	FC Dallas	34	11	10	13	41	37	+4	46	Qualification for round one
8	Sporting Kansas City	34	12	14	8	48	51	−3	44	Qualification for the wild card round
9	San Jose Earthquakes	34	10	10	14	39	43	−4	44	Qualification for the wild card round
10	Portland Timbers	34	11	13	10	46	58	−12	43	
11	Minnesota United FC	34	10	13	11	46	51	−5	41	
12	Austin FC	34	10	15	9	49	55	−6	39	
13	LA Galaxy	34	8	14	12	51	67	−16	36	
14	Colorado Rapids	34	5	17	12	26	54	−28	27	

Source: MLS
Rules for classification: 1) points; 2) total wins; 3) total goal differential; 4) total goals scored; 5) fewer disciplinary points; 6) away goal differential; 7) away goals scored; 8) home goals differential; 9) home goals scored; 10) coin toss (2 clubs tied) or drawing of lots (≥3 clubs tied)

=== Overall table ===
The leading team in this table won the Supporters' Shield.

Overall MLS standings table
Pos	Team	Pld	W	L	T	GF	GA	GD	Pts	Qualification
1	FC Cincinnati (S)	34	20	5	9	57	39	+18	69	Qualification for the CONCACAF Champions Cup round one (Note: As 2023 MLS Supporters' Shield champions)
2	Orlando City SC	34	18	7	9	55	39	+16	63	Qualification for the CONCACAF Champions Cup round one (Note: As highest-ranked club in 2023 MLS Supporters' Shield not already qualified)
3	Columbus Crew (C)	34	16	9	9	67	46	+21	57	Qualification for the CONCACAF Champions Cup round of 16 (Note: As MLS Cup 2023 champions)
4	St. Louis City SC	34	17	12	5	62	45	+17	56	Qualification for the CONCACAF Champions Cup round one (Note: As 2023 Western Conference regular season champions)
5	Philadelphia Union	34	15	9	10	57	41	+16	55	Qualification for the CONCACAF Champions Cup round one (Note: As 2023 Leagues Cup third place)
6	New England Revolution	34	15	9	10	58	46	+12	55	Qualification for the CONCACAF Champions Cup round one (Note: As second highest-ranked club in 2023 MLS Supporters' Shield not already qualified)
7	Seattle Sounders FC	34	14	9	11	41	32	+9	53	Qualification for the U.S. Open Cup round of 32 (Note: As one of the top seven teams in the overall table to not qualify for the 2024 CONCACAF Champions Cup)
8	Los Angeles FC	34	14	10	10	54	39	+15	52	Qualification for the U.S. Open Cup round of 32
9	Houston Dynamo FC (U)	34	14	11	9	51	38	+13	51	Qualification for the CONCACAF Champions Cup round one and the U.S. Open Cup round of 32 (Note: Qualified for both the Champions Cup and U.S. Open Cup as 2023 U.S. Open Cup champions)
10	Atlanta United FC	34	13	9	12	66	53	+13	51	Qualification for the U.S. Open Cup round of 32
11	Real Salt Lake	34	14	12	8	48	50	−2	50	Qualification for the U.S. Open Cup round of 32
12	Nashville SC	34	13	11	10	39	32	+7	49	Qualification for the CONCACAF Champions Cup round one (Note: As 2023 Leagues Cup runners-up)
13	Vancouver Whitecaps FC (V)	34	12	10	12	55	48	+7	48	Qualification for the CONCACAF Champions Cup round one (Note: As 2023 Canadian Championship winners)
14	FC Dallas	34	11	10	13	41	37	+4	46	Qualification for the U.S. Open Cup round of 32
15	Sporting Kansas City	34	12	14	8	48	51	−3	44	Qualification for the U.S. Open Cup round of 32
16	San Jose Earthquakes	34	10	10	14	39	43	−4	44	Qualification for the U.S. Open Cup round of 32
17	New York Red Bulls	34	11	13	10	36	39	−3	43	
18	Portland Timbers	34	11	13	10	46	58	−12	43	
19	Charlotte FC	34	10	11	13	45	52	−7	43	
20	CF Montréal	34	12	17	5	36	52	−16	41	
21	Minnesota United FC	34	10	13	11	46	51	−5	41	
22	New York City FC	34	9	11	14	35	39	−4	41	
23	D.C. United	34	10	14	10	45	49	−4	40	
24	Chicago Fire FC	34	10	14	10	39	51	−12	40	
25	Austin FC	34	10	15	9	49	55	−6	39	
26	LA Galaxy	34	8	14	12	51	67	−16	36	
27	Inter Miami CF (L)	34	9	18	7	41	54	−13	34	Qualification for the CONCACAF Champions Cup round of 16 (Note: As 2023 Leagues Cup champions)
28	Colorado Rapids	34	5	17	12	26	54	−28	27	
29	Toronto FC	34	4	20	10	26	59	−33	22	

Source: MLS
Rules for classification: 1) points; 2) total wins; 3) total goal differential; 4) total goals scored; 5) fewer disciplinary points; 6) away goal differential; 7) away goals scored; 8) home goals differential; 9) home goals scored; 10) coin toss (2 clubs tied) or drawing of lots (≥3 clubs tied)
(C) MLS Cup champion; (L) Leagues Cup winner; (S) Supporters' Shield winner; (U) U.S. Open Cup winner; (V) Canadian Championship winner

=== Results ===
Color Key: Home • Away • Win • Loss • Draw
Club	Match																																	
Club	1	2	3	4	5	6	7	8	9	10	11	12	13	14	15	16	17	18	19	20	21	22	23	24	25	26	27	28	29	30	31	32	33	34
Atlanta United FC (ATL)	SJE	TOR	CLT	POR	CLB	NYRB	NYC	TOR	CHI	NSH	MIA	CLT	COL	CHI	ORL	NER	LAFC	DCU	NYC	NYRB	PHI	MTL	NER	ORL	SEA	NSH	CIN	DAL	MIA	DCU	MTL	PHI	CLB	CIN
Atlanta United FC (ATL)	2–1	1–1	0–3	5–1	6–1	1–0	1–1	2–2	2–1	3–1	2–1	1–3	4–0	3–3	1–1	3–3	0–0	3–1	2–2	4–0	2–0	0–1	2–1	1–2	0–2	4–0	1–2	2–2	5–2	1–1	4–1	3–2	1–1	2–2
Austin (ATX)	STL	MTL	RSL	HOU	COL	LAFC	VAN	LAG	SJE	POR	DAL	SEA	TOR	HOU	MIN	RSL	SKC	DAL	HOU	MIA	MIN	VAN	SKC	STL	DAL	SEA	NER	POR	NYRB	LAG	COL	DCU	LAFC	SJE
Austin (ATX)	2–3	1–0	1–2	2–0	1–1	3–0	0–0	2–0	2–2	2–2	0–1	1–2	1–0	2–1	2–1	1–2	4–1	3–0	3–0	1–1	1–4	2–1	2–1	6–3	1–0	1–2	2–2	1–2	1–1	3–3	1–0	3–0	2–4	1–1
Charlotte (CLT)	NER	STL	ATL	ORL	NYRB	TOR	RSL	COL	CLB	DCU	NYC	ATL	CHI	NSH	LAG	PHI	CLB	SEA	NYRB	MTL	NYC	CIN	MTL	MIA	LAFC	ORL	NSH	DCU	PHI	CIN	NER	TOR	CHI	MIA
Charlotte (CLT)	0–1	3–1	0–3	1–2	1–1	2–2	3–1	2–2	1–0	3–0	3–2	1–3	2–1	1–2	0–1	1–0	4–2	3–3	2–2	0–0	1–1	2–2	2–0	2–2	2–1	1–1	1–1	0–0	2–2	3–0	2–1	3–0	0–2	1–0
Chicago Fire (CHI)	NYC	PHI	CIN	MIA	DCU	MIN	PHI	ATL	NYRB	NSH	STL	CLT	ATL	NER	TOR	CIN	CLB	POR	SKC	ORL	NSH	MTL	TOR	ORL	LAG	VAN	DCU	MTL	CLB	NER	NYRB	MIA	CLT	NYC
Chicago Fire (CHI)	1–1	1–0	3–3	2–3	0–0	2–1	2–2	2–1	2–2	3–0	1–0	2–1	3–3	3–3	0–0	1–0	1–2	1–2	0–1	3–1	1–0	3–0	1–0	1–3	3–0	0–1	4–0	0–0	3–0	2–2	0–1	4–1	0–2	1–0
Cincinnati (CIN)	HOU	ORL	SEA	CHI	NSH	MIA	PHI	STL	POR	NER	DCU	MTL	CLB	COL	NYC	CHI	VAN	TOR	DCU	NER	CLT	NYRB	NSH	CLB	NYC	ATL	ORL	PHI	MTL	CLT	TOR	NYRB	MIA	ATL
Cincinnati (CIN)	2–1	0–0	1–0	3–3	0–1	1–0	1–0	5–1	2–1	1–1	2–1	3–0	3–2	0–1	1–3	1–0	1–1	3–0	3–0	2–2	2–2	1–2	3–1	3–0	3–0	1–2	0–1	2–2	1–1	3–0	2–3	1–2	0–1	2–2
Colorado Rapids (COL)	SEA	SKC	SJE	MIN	ATX	LAFC	SKC	CLT	STL	VAN	LAG	PHI	ATL	RSL	CIN	CLB	SJE	ORL	VAN	LAG	STL	POR	DAL	HOU	LAFC	MIN	RSL	NER	SEA	POR	ATX	DAL	HOU	RSL
Colorado Rapids (COL)	4–0	0–0	1–0	1–2	1–1	0–0	0–1	2–2	1–1	0–0	1–3	1–2	4–0	2–3	0–1	3–2	0–0	2–0	2–2	0–0	2–0	0–0	2–1	0–0	4–0	3–0	2–0	2–1	1–2	3–2	1–0	1–1	5–1	0–1
Columbus Crew (CLB)	PHI	DCU	TOR	NYRB	ATL	RSL	DCU	NER	CLT	MIA	ORL	LAG	CIN	NSH	COL	CLT	CHI	NYC	NSH	NYRB	MIA	NYC	POR	CIN	TOR	HOU	MTL	ORL	CHI	DAL	PHI	NER	ATL	MTL
Columbus Crew (CLB)	4–1	2–0	1–1	2–1	6–1	4–0	0–2	1–1	1–0	1–2	2–2	2–0	3–2	3–1	3–2	4–2	1–2	1–1	2–0	2–1	2–2	1–1	3–2	3–0	2–0	2–0	2–4	4–3	3–0	1–1	1–1	1–2	1–1	2–1
Dallas (DAL)	MIN	LAG	VAN	SKC	LAFC	POR	MIA	RSL	NYC	MIN	STL	ATX	VAN	HOU	SJE	SKC	NSH	POR	ATX	LAFC	DCU	COL	SEA	PHI	ATX	STL	ATL	SEA	RSL	CLB	HOU	COL	SJE	LAG
Dallas (DAL)	0–1	3–1	1–1	2–1	2–1	1–1	0–1	2–1	3–1	0–0	2–0	0–1	2–1	1–1	1–1	2–1	1–2	1–0	3–0	2–0	0–1	2–1	1–1	1–1	1–0	2–1	2–2	1–1	1–3	1–1	0–0	1–1	1–1	1–4
D.C. United (DCU)	TOR	CLB	ORL	NYC	NER	CHI	CLB	MTL	ORL	CLT	CIN	NSH	PHI	LAG	TOR	MTL	MIA	ATL	RSL	CIN	NSH	DAL	MIA	NER	NYRB	PHI	CHI	SJE	CLT	ATL	NYRB	VAN	ATX	NYC
D.C. United (DCU)	3–2	2–0	1–1	3–2	1–2	0–0	0–2	0–1	1–3	3–0	2–1	1–1	0–0	3–0	2–1	2–2	1–2	3–1	1–2	3–0	2–0	0–1	2–2	4–0	1–0	1–3	4–0	0–0	0–0	1–1	3–5	2–2	3–0	2–0
Houston Dynamo (HOU)	CIN	NER	ATX	NYC	SJE	LAG	NYRB	MIA	LAFC	RSL	SEA	MIN	DAL	ATX	VAN	STL	LAFC	SJE	ATX	SEA	SKC	MIN	COL	POR	RSL	CLB	LAG	STL	VAN	SKC	DAL	MTL	COL	POR
Houston Dynamo (HOU)	2–1	3–0	2–0	1–0	2–1	3–0	1–1	1–0	0–1	0–0	0–1	1–0	1–1	2–1	6–2	3–0	4–0	4–1	3–0	1–0	2–2	0–3	0–0	5–0	0–3	2–0	0–0	1–1	4–1	2–1	0–0	1–1	5–1	1–3
LAFC (LAFC)	POR	NER	SEA	DAL	COL	ATX	LAG	NSH	HOU	SJE	RSL	SKC	SJE	STL	ATL	HOU	SKC	SEA	VAN	DAL	LAG	SJE	MIN	COL	CLT	MIA	POR	LAG	STL	PHI	RSL	MIN	ATX	VAN
LAFC (LAFC)	3–2	4–0	0–0	2–1	0–0	3–0	2–3	1–1	0–1	2–1	0–3	1–1	2–1	3–0	0–0	4–0	1–2	1–0	2–3	2–0	2–1	1–1	1–1	4–0	2–1	1–3	2–0	4–2	0–0	0–0	0–1	5–1	2–4	1–1
LA Galaxy (LAG)	DAL	SKC	VAN	POR	SEA	HOU	LAFC	ATX	ORL	COL	SJE	CLB	DCU	CLT	RSL	STL	SKC	COL	SJE	LAFC	PHI	VAN	RSL	CHI	SJE	HOU	STL	LAFC	MIN	ATX	POR	SEA	MIN	DAL
LA Galaxy (LAG)	3–1	0–0	1–1	0–0	1–2	3–0	2–3	2–0	2–0	1–3	2–1	2–0	3–0	0–1	2–3	1–1	2–2	0–0	2–2	2–1	3–1	4–2	2–2	3–0	2–3	0–0	2–2	4–2	4–3	3–3	3–3	2–1	5–2	1–4
Inter Miami CF (MIA)	MTL	PHI	NYC	TOR	CHI	CIN	DAL	HOU	CLB	ATL	NER	NSH	ORL	MTL	NYRB	DCU	NER	PHI	ATX	CLB	DCU	STL	CLT	NYRB	NSH	LAFC	SKC	ATL	TOR	ORL	NYC	CHI	CIN	CLT
Inter Miami CF (MIA)	2–0	2–0	1–0	2–0	2–3	1–0	0–1	1–0	1–2	2–1	2–1	2–1	1–3	1–0	0–1	1–2	3–1	4–1	1–1	2–2	2–2	3–0	2–2	0–2	0–0	1–3	3–2	5–2	4–0	1–1	1–1	4–1	0–1	1–0
Minnesota United FC (MIN)	DAL	NYRB	COL	VAN	STL	CHI	ORL	SEA	DAL	VAN	SKC	HOU	POR	RSL	ATX	TOR	MTL	RSL	POR	ATX	HOU	LAFC	NYC	SEA	COL	SJE	NER	SKC	LAG	STL	SJE	LAFC	LAG	SKC
Minnesota United FC (MIN)	0–1	1–1	1–2	1–1	0–1	2–1	1–2	1–0	0–0	3–2	3–0	1–0	0–1	1–1	2–1	1–1	4–0	2–2	4–1	1–4	0–3	1–1	0–2	1–1	3–0	1–1	1–1	0–1	4–3	1–2	1–1	5–1	5–2	3–1
Montréal (MTL)	MIA	ATX	NSH	PHI	VAN	NER	DCU	NYRB	SKC	ORL	TOR	CIN	NYRB	MIA	DCU	PHI	MIN	NSH	CLT	NYC	ATL	CHI	CLT	TOR	NER	NYC	CLB	CHI	CIN	ATL	ORL	HOU	POR	CLB
Montréal (MTL)	2–0	1–0	2–0	3–2	5–0	4–0	0–1	2–0	0–2	2–0	2–0	3–0	2–1	1–0	2–2	3–0	4–0	1–0	0–0	0–1	0–1	3–0	2–0	2–3	1–0	2–0	2–4	0–0	1–1	4–1	3–0	1–1	4–1	2–1
Nashville (NSH)	NYC	NYRB	MTL	NER	CIN	ORL	TOR	NYC	LAFC	ATL	CHI	DCU	MIA	CLT	CLB	DAL	TOR	STL	MTL	CLB	DCU	CHI	PHI	CIN	NER	ATL	MIA	CLT	SKC	SJE	SEA	ORL	PHI	NYRB
Nashville (NSH)	2–0	0–0	2–0	1–0	0–1	0–2	0–0	2–1	1–1	3–1	3–0	1–1	2–1	1–2	3–1	1–2	1–1	3–1	0–1	2–0	2–0	1–0	0–2	3–1	3–2	4–0	0–0	1–1	0–3	1–1	0–0	0–1	0–0	0–1
New England Revolution (NER)	CLT	HOU	LAFC	NSH	DCU	NYC	MTL	CLB	SKC	CIN	TOR	MIA	PHI	CHI	ATL	NYC	MIA	ORL	TOR	CIN	NYRB	ATL	DCU	NSH	MTL	NYRB	ATX	MIN	COL	CHI	CLT	CLB	ORL	PHI
New England Revolution (NER)	0–1	3–0	4–0	1–0	1–2	1–1	4–0	1–1	2–1	1–1	0–2	2–1	3–0	3–3	3–3	0–0	3–1	3–1	2–1	2–2	2–1	2–1	4–0	3–2	1–0	1–0	2–2	1–1	2–1	2–2	2–1	1–2	3–2	2–1
NYCFC (NYC)	NSH	CHI	MIA	DCU	HOU	NER	ATL	NSH	DAL	TOR	CLT	NYRB	ORL	PHI	CIN	NER	RSL	CLB	ATL	POR	MTL	CLT	CLB	PHI	MIN	CIN	MTL	VAN	NYRB	ORL	TOR	MIA	DCU	CHI
NYCFC (NYC)	2–0	1–1	1–0	3–2	1–0	1–1	1–1	2–1	3–1	1–0	3–2	1–0	1–1	1–3	1–3	0–0	0–0	1–1	2–2	1–1	0–1	1–1	1–1	2–1	0–2	3–0	2–0	1–1	0–0	2–0	3–0	1–1	2–0	1–0
New York Red Bulls (NYRB)	ORL	NSH	MIN	CLB	CLT	ATL	SJE	HOU	MTL	CHI	PHI	NYC	TOR	MTL	SEA	MIA	ORL	CLT	ATL	CLB	NER	CIN	RSL	DCU	MIA	NER	PHI	NYC	ATX	DCU	CHI	CIN	TOR	NSH
New York Red Bulls (NYRB)	1–0	0–0	1–1	2–1	1–1	1–0	1–1	1–1	2–0	1–1	0–1	1–0	0–0	2–1	1–0	0–1	0–3	2–2	4–0	2–1	2–1	1–2	3–1	1–0	0–2	1–0	4–1	0–0	1–1	3–5	0–1	1–2	3–0	0–1
Orlando City SC (ORL)	NYRB	CIN	DCU	CLT	PHI	NSH	MIN	DCU	LAG	MTL	CLB	NYC	MIA	ATL	NYRB	COL	NER	PHI	SEA	CHI	TOR	RSL	ATL	CHI	STL	CLT	CIN	CLB	NYC	MIA	MTL	NSH	NER	TOR
Orlando City SC (ORL)	1–0	0–0	1–1	1–2	1–2	0–2	1–2	1–3	2–0	2–0	2–2	1–1	1–3	1–1	0–3	2–0	3–1	2–2	0–0	3–1	4–0	4–0	1–2	1–3	2–1	1–1	0–1	4–3	2–0	1–1	3–0	0–1	3–2	0–2
Philadelphia Union (PHI)	CLB	MIA	CHI	MTL	ORL	SKC	CIN	CHI	TOR	NYRB	COL	DCU	NER	NYC	CLT	MTL	SJE	ORL	MIA	ATL	LAG	NSH	NYC	DAL	DCU	TOR	NYRB	CIN	CLT	LAFC	CLB	ATL	NSH	NER
Philadelphia Union (PHI)	4–1	2–0	1–0	3–2	1–2	0–0	1–0	2–2	4–2	0–1	1–2	0–0	3–0	1–3	1–0	3–0	2–1	2–2	4–1	2–0	3–1	0–2	2–1	1–1	1–3	3–1	4–1	2–2	2–2	0–0	1–1	3–2	0–0	2–1
Portland Timbers (POR)	SKC	LAFC	STL	ATL	LAG	DAL	VAN	SEA	CIN	STL	ATX	VAN	RSL	MIN	SKC	SEA	DAL	SJE	CHI	NYC	MIN	COL	CLB	HOU	VAN	RSL	SEA	LAFC	ATX	SJE	COL	LAG	MTL	HOU
Portland Timbers (POR)	1–0	3–2	1–2	5–1	0–0	1–1	1–0	4–1	2–1	1–2	2–2	3–1	0–0	0–1	4–1	0–0	1–0	0–0	1–2	1–1	4–1	0–0	3–2	5–0	2–3	2–1	2–2	2–0	1–2	2–1	3–2	3–3	4–1	1–3
Real Salt Lake (RSL)	VAN	SEA	ATX	STL	CLB	CLT	DAL	SJE	SEA	HOU	LAFC	POR	COL	MIN	LAG	ATX	NYC	DCU	STL	MIN	TOR	ORL	SKC	NYRB	LAG	HOU	POR	COL	SJE	DAL	VAN	LAFC	SKC	COL
Real Salt Lake (RSL)	1–2	2–0	1–2	0–4	4–0	3–1	2–1	3–1	0–0	0–0	0–3	0–0	2–3	1–1	2–3	1–2	0–0	1–2	1–3	2–2	0–1	4–0	2–2	3–1	2–2	0–3	2–1	2–0	2–1	1–3	2–1	0–1	2–3	0–1
San Jose Earthquakes (SJE)	ATL	VAN	COL	STL	TOR	HOU	NYRB	SKC	RSL	ATX	LAFC	LAG	LAFC	DAL	SEA	COL	PHI	POR	HOU	STL	LAG	LAFC	SEA	VAN	SKC	LAG	MIN	DCU	RSL	POR	NSH	MIN	DAL	ATX
San Jose Earthquakes (SJE)	2–1	2–1	1–0	3–0	0–0	2–1	1–1	3–0	3–1	2–2	2–1	2–1	2–1	1–1	0–1	0–0	2–1	0–0	4–1	1–2	2–2	1–1	2–0	0–1	3–0	2–3	1–1	0–0	2–1	2–1	1–1	1–1	1–1	1–1
Seattle Sounders FC (SEA)	COL	RSL	CIN	LAFC	SKC	LAG	STL	POR	MIN	RSL	SKC	HOU	ATX	VAN	NYRB	SJE	POR	CLT	LAFC	ORL	HOU	VAN	SJE	DAL	ATL	MIN	ATX	POR	DAL	COL	NSH	LAG	VAN	STL
Seattle Sounders FC (SEA)	4–0	2–0	1–0	0–0	1–4	1–2	3–0	4–1	1–0	0–0	1–2	0–1	1–2	2–0	1–0	0–1	0–0	3–3	1–0	0–0	1–0	2–3	2–0	1–1	0–2	1–1	1–2	2–2	1–1	1–2	0–0	2–1	0–0	0–2
Sporting Kansas City (SKC)	POR	COL	LAG	DAL	SEA	PHI	COL	SJE	NER	MTL	SEA	MIN	LAFC	STL	POR	DAL	VAN	ATX	LAFC	LAG	CHI	VAN	HOU	RSL	ATX	SJE	STL	MIA	MIN	NSH	HOU	STL	RSL	MIN
Sporting Kansas City (SKC)	1–0	0–0	0–0	2–1	1–4	0–0	0–1	3–0	2–1	0–2	1–2	3–0	1–1	4–0	4–1	2–1	1–1	4–1	1–2	2–2	0–1	3–0	2–2	2–2	2–1	3–0	2–1	3–2	0–1	0–3	2–1	4–1	2–3	3–1
St. Louis City SC (STL)	ATX	CLT	POR	SJE	RSL	MIN	SEA	CIN	COL	POR	DAL	CHI	SKC	VAN	LAFC	HOU	LAG	NSH	RSL	SJE	COL	TOR	MIA	ATX	ORL	DAL	SKC	LAG	HOU	LAFC	MIN	SKC	VAN	SEA
St. Louis City SC (STL)	2–3	3–1	1–2	3–0	0–4	0–1	3–0	5–1	1–1	1–2	2–0	1–0	4–0	3–1	3–0	3–0	1–1	3–1	1–3	1–2	2–0	0–1	3–0	6–3	2–1	2–1	2–1	2–2	1–1	0–0	1–2	4–1	3–0	0–2
Toronto (TOR)	DCU	ATL	CLB	MIA	SJE	CLT	NSH	ATL	PHI	NYC	NER	MTL	NYRB	ATX	DCU	CHI	MIN	NSH	CIN	NER	RSL	ORL	STL	CHI	MTL	CLB	PHI	VAN	MIA	NYC	CIN	CLT	NYRB	ORL
Toronto (TOR)	3–2	1–1	1–1	2–0	0–0	2–2	0–0	2–2	4–2	1–0	0–2	2–0	0–0	1–0	2–1	0–0	1–1	1–1	3–0	2–1	0–1	4–0	0–1	1–0	2–3	2–0	3–1	1–2	4–0	3–0	2–3	3–0	3–0	0–2
Vancouver Whitecaps FC (VAN)	RSL	SJE	DAL	LAG	MIN	MTL	POR	ATX	COL	MIN	POR	DAL	SEA	STL	HOU	SKC	CIN	COL	LAFC	SKC	SEA	ATX	LAG	SJE	POR	CHI	NYC	TOR	HOU	RSL	DCU	STL	SEA	LAFC
Vancouver Whitecaps FC (VAN)	1–2	2–1	1–1	1–1	1–1	5–0	1–0	0–0	0–0	3–2	3–1	2–1	2–0	3–1	6–2	1–1	1–1	2–2	2–3	3–0	2–3	2–1	4–2	0–1	2–3	0–1	1–1	1–2	4–1	2–1	2–2	3–0	0–0	1–1

=== MLS All-Star Game ===
2023 MLS All-Star Game
July 19, 2023
8:30 p.m. EDT

MLS All-Stars (United States) (Canada)	0–5	(England) Arsenal
	Report	Gabriel Jesus 5'; Trossard 23'; Jorginho 48' (pen.); Martinelli 84'; Havertz 89'

Audi Field, Washington, D.C.
Attendance: 20,621
Referee: Ted Unkel (United States)

== MLS Cup playoffs ==
=== Bracket ===
The higher seeded teams hosted single-elimination matches, with the MLS Cup host determined by overall points in the Supporters' Shield table. During the best-of-three round, the team with higher seed hosted the first match, and the third match if necessary.

Wild card single match
E8	New York Red Bulls	5
E9	Charlotte FC	2
W8	Sporting Kansas City (p)	0 (4)
W9	San Jose Earthquakes	0 (2)

Round one best-of-three series
E1	FC Cincinnati	3	1 (8)	–
E8	New York Red Bulls	0	1 (7)	–
E4	Philadelphia Union	3	1	–
E5	New England Revolution	1	0	–
E3	Columbus Crew	2	2	4
E6	Atlanta United FC	0	4	2
E2	Orlando City SC	1	1	–
E7	Nashville SC	0	0	–
W1	St. Louis City SC	1	1	–
W8	Sporting Kansas City	4	2	–
W4	Houston Dynamo FC	2	1 (4)	1 (4)
W5	Real Salt Lake	1	1 (5)	1 (3)
W3	Los Angeles FC	5	1	–
W6	Vancouver Whitecaps FC	2	0	–
W2	Seattle Sounders FC	2	1	1
W7	FC Dallas	0	3	0

Conference semifinals single match
E1	FC Cincinnati	1
E4	Philadelphia Union	0
Eastern Conference
E3	Columbus Crew (a.e.t.)	2
E2	Orlando City SC	0
W8	Sporting Kansas City	0
W4	Houston Dynamo FC	1
Western Conference
W3	Los Angeles FC	1
W2	Seattle Sounders FC	0

Conference finals single match
E1	FC Cincinnati	2
E3	Columbus Crew (a.e.t.)	3
W4	Houston Dynamo FC	0
W3	Los Angeles FC	2

MLS Cup single match
E3	Columbus Crew	2
W3	Los Angeles FC	1

=== MLS Cup ===
December 9, 2023
4:00 p.m. EST

Columbus Crew	2–1	Los Angeles FC
Hernández 33' (pen.); Yeboah 37'	Report	Bouanga 74'

Lower.com Field, Columbus, Ohio
Attendance: 20,802
Referee: Armando Villarreal

== Attendance ==
=== Average home attendances ===
Rank	Team	GP	Cumulative	High	Low	Mean
1	Atlanta United FC	17	807,947	71,635	42,539	47,526
2	Charlotte FC	17	617,729	69,345	27,236	36,337
3	Seattle Sounders FC	17	546,744	42,054	30,011	32,161
4	Nashville SC	17	480,370	31,840	25,839	28,257
5	FC Cincinnati	17	431,238	25,513	25,082	25,367
6	Toronto FC	17	430,263	27,892	20,701	25,310
7	LA Galaxy	17	409,794	82,110	16,035	24,106
8	New England Revolution	17	406,981	41,355	13,176	23,940
9	Portland Timbers	17	392,744	25,218	21,320	23,103
10	St. Louis City SC	17	381,191	22,423	22,423	22,423
11	Los Angeles FC	17	376,643	22,921	22,007	22,155
12	Austin FC	17	352,546	20,738	20,738	20,738
13	Orlando City SC	17	350,023	24,440	17,012	20,590
14	Columbus Crew	17	345,338	20,730	19,249	20,314
15	New York City FC	17	334,443	30,615	7,417	19,673
16	Minnesota United FC	17	332,659	19,913	18,410	19,568
17	Real Salt Lake	17	330,290	21,471	16,666	19,429
18	Philadelphia Union	17	321,425	19,535	18,533	18,907
19	Sporting Kansas City	17	316,474	20,479	17,178	18,616
20	San Jose Earthquakes	17	313,003	45,112	12,434	18,412
21	New York Red Bulls	17	310,190	26,276	12,932	18,246
22	FC Dallas	17	310,065	19,906	15,890	18,239
23	Chicago Fire FC	17	308,885	62,124	7,815	18,170
24	CF Montréal	17	298,376	23,352	13,509	17,552
25	D.C. United	17	298,185	19,215	12,591	17,540
26	Inter Miami CF	17	295,149	20,452	13,892	17,362
27	Vancouver Whitecaps FC	17	284,661	25,146	13,232	16,745
28	Colorado Rapids	17	261,953	18,171	12,064	15,409
29	Houston Dynamo FC	17	255,495	19,128	10,873	15,029
Total		493	10,900,804	82,110	7,417	22,111

=== Highest attendances ===
Regular season

Rank	Home team	Score	Away team	Attendance	Date	Matchday	Stadium	Ref.
1	LA Galaxy	2–1	Los Angeles FC	82,110	July 4, 2023	23	Rose Bowl	
2	Atlanta United FC	5–2	Inter Miami CF	71,635	September 16, 2023	32	Mercedes-Benz Stadium	
3	Charlotte FC	0–1	New England Revolution	69,345	February 25, 2023	1	Bank of America Stadium	
4	Atlanta United FC	2–1	San Jose Earthquakes	67,538	February 25, 2023	1	Mercedes-Benz Stadium	
5	Atlanta United FC	4–0	Nashville SC	67,514	August 26, 2023	28	Mercedes-Benz Stadium	
6	Charlotte FC	1–0	Inter Miami CF	66,101	October 21, 2023	38	Bank of America Stadium	
7	Chicago Fire FC	4–1	Inter Miami CF	62,124	October 4, 2023	36	Soldier Field	
8	San Jose Earthquakes	2–1	Los Angeles FC	45,112	May 6, 2023	11	Levi's Stadium	
9	Charlotte FC	2–2	FC Cincinnati	43,613	July 8, 2023	24	Bank of America Stadium	
10	Atlanta United FC	1–2	Orlando City SC	43,576	July 15, 2023	26	Mercedes-Benz Stadium	

2023 MLS Cup Playoffs

Rank	Home team	Score	Away team	Attendance	Date	Stadium	Ref.
1	Atlanta United FC	4–2	Columbus Crew	41,850	November 7, 2023	Mercedes-Benz Stadium	
2	Seattle Sounders FC	0–1	Los Angeles FC	33,649	November 26, 2023	Lumen Field	
3	Seattle Sounders FC	1–0	FC Dallas	33,048	November 10, 2023	Lumen Field	
4	Seattle Sounders FC	2–0	FC Dallas	30,741	October 30, 2023	Lumen Field	
5	Vancouver Whitecaps FC	0–1	Los Angeles FC	30,204	November 5, 2023	BC Place	
6	Orlando City SC	0–2 (a.e.t.)	Columbus Crew	25,527	November 25, 2023	Exploria Stadium	
7	FC Cincinnati	1–0	Philadelphia Union	25,513	November 25, 2023	TQL Stadium	
8	FC Cincinnati	2–3 (a.e.t.)	Columbus Crew	25,513	December 2, 2023	TQL Stadium	
9	Nashville SC	0–1	Orlando City SC	25,315	November 7, 2023	Geodis Park	
10	FC Cincinnati	3–0	New York Red Bulls	24,022	October 29, 2023	TQL Stadium	

== Player statistics ==
=== Goals ===
Rank	Player	Club	Goals
1	(Gabon) Denis Bouanga	Los Angeles FC	20
2	(Argentina) Luciano Acosta	FC Cincinnati	17
2	(Greece) Giorgos Giakoumakis	Atlanta United FC	17
4	(Colombia) Cucho Hernández	Columbus Crew	16
5	(Germany) Hany Mukhtar	Nashville SC	15
5	(United States) Brian White	Vancouver Whitecaps FC	15
7	(Belgium) Christian Benteke	D.C. United	14
7	(Argentina) Julián Carranza	Philadelphia Union	14
7	(Hungary) Dániel Gazdag	Philadelphia Union	14
7	(Mexico) Alan Pulido	Sporting Kansas City	14
7	(Uruguay) Facundo Torres	Orlando City SC	14

=== Hat-tricks ===
Player	For	Against	Score	Date
(United States) Jordan Morris^{4}	Seattle Sounders FC	Sporting Kansas City	4–1 (A)	March 25, 2023
(Gabon) Denis Bouanga	Los Angeles FC	Austin FC	3–0 (H)	April 8, 2023
(Denmark) Mikael Uhre	Philadelphia Union	Toronto FC	4–2 (H)	April 22, 2023
(Germany) Hany Mukhtar	Nashville SC	Chicago Fire FC	3–0 (H)	May 6, 2023
(Germany) Hany Mukhtar	Nashville SC	St. Louis City SC	3–1 (H)	June 17, 2023
(Colombia) Cucho Hernández	Columbus Crew	CF Montréal	4–2 (A)	September 2, 2023
(Colombia) Cucho Hernández	Columbus Crew	Chicago Fire FC	3–0 (H)	September 20, 2023
(England) Billy Sharp	LA Galaxy	Minnesota United FC	4–3 (H)	September 20, 2023
(Belgium) Christian Benteke	D.C. United	New York Red Bulls	3–5 (H)	September 23, 2023
(Gabon) Denis Bouanga	Los Angeles FC	Minnesota United FC	5–1 (H)	October 4, 2023
(Finland) Teemu Pukki^{4}	Minnesota United FC	LA Galaxy	5–2 (H)	October 7, 2023

Notes

(H) – Home team
(A) – Away team
^{4} Scored 4 goals

=== Assists ===
Rank	Player	Club	Assists
1	(Argentina) Thiago Almada	Atlanta United FC	19
2	(Mexico) Héctor Herrera	Houston Dynamo FC	17
3	(Spain) Carles Gil	New England Revolution	15
4	(Argentina) Luciano Acosta	FC Cincinnati	14
4	(Germany) Eduard Löwen	St. Louis City SC	14
6	(Argentina) Cristian Espinoza	San Jose Earthquakes	13
7	(Scotland) Ryan Gauld	Vancouver Whitecaps FC	12
7	(Uruguay) Mauricio Pereyra	Orlando City SC	12
7	(Mexico) Carlos Vela	Los Angeles FC	12
10	(Hungary) Dániel Gazdag	Philadelphia Union	11
10	(Colombia) Cucho Hernández	Columbus Crew	11
10	(Romania) Alexandru Mățan	Columbus Crew	11
10	(Germany) Hany Mukhtar	Nashville SC	11
10	(Republic of Ireland) Connor Ronan	Colorado Rapids	11
10	(Germany) Erik Thommy	Sporting Kansas City	11

=== Clean sheets ===
Rank	Player	Club	Clean sheets
1	(Switzerland) Stefan Frei	Seattle Sounders FC	14
2	(United States) Roman Celentano	FC Cincinnati	12
2	(United States) Steve Clark	Houston Dynamo FC	12
4	(Canada) Jonathan Sirois	CF Montréal	11
5	(Peru) Pedro Gallese	Orlando City SC	10
5	(United States) Joe Willis	Nashville SC	10
7	(Paraguay) Carlos Coronel	New York Red Bulls	9
7	(United States) Zac MacMath	Real Salt Lake	9
9	(Jamaica) Andre Blake	Philadelphia Union	8
9	(United States) Chris Brady	Chicago Fire FC	8
9	(Switzerland) Roman Bürki	St. Louis City SC	8
9	(United States) John McCarthy	Los Angeles FC	8
9	(Canada) Dayne St. Clair	Minnesota United FC	8
9	(Japan) Yohei Takaoka	Vancouver Whitecaps FC	8

== Awards ==
=== Team/Player of the matchday ===
- **Bold** denotes league player of the matchday.

Team of the Matchday
Matchday	Goalkeeper	Defenders	Midfielders	Forwards	Bench	Coach
1	(United States) Callender (MIA)	(Ukraine) Kryvtsov (MIA) (United States) Zimmerman (NSH) (United States) Kessler (NE)	(Hungary) Gazdag (PHI) (Nigeria) Nwobodo (CIN) (Germany) Löwen (STL) (Argentina) **Almada** (ATL)	(United States) J. Morris (SEA) (Argentina) Carranza (PHI) (United States) Ku-DiPietro (DC)	(Peru) Gallese (ORL) (Cameroon) Nouhou (SEA) (Colombia) Mosquera (POR) (United States) Buck (NE) (Honduras) Arriaga (MIN) (Croatia) Kreilach (RSL) (United States) C. Roldan (SEA) (Canada) Shaffelburg (NSH) (Brazil) Klauss (STL)	(South Africa) Bradley Carnell (STL)
2	(United States) Yarbrough (COL)	(El Salvador) A. Roldán (SEA) (Italy) Chiellini (LAFC) (Finland) Ring (ATX) (United States) Bye (NE)	(Armenia) **Zelarayán** (CLB) (Germany) Löwen (STL) (Germany) Herbers (CHI) (Mexico) Pizarro (MIA)	(United States) Ferreira (DAL) (United States) Ebobisse (SJ)	(United States) Johnson (TOR) (United States) S. Nealis (RBNY) (Equatorial Guinea) Akapo (SJ) (Brazil) Mota (MIA) (United States) Pomykal (DAL) (Colombia) Borrero (NE) (Ghana) Opoku (LAFC) (United States) J. Morris (SEA) (Argentina) Urruti (ATX)	(England) Phil Neville (MIA)
3	(England) Bond (LAG)	(Canada) Hiebert (STL) (Colombia) Reyes (RBNY) (United States) Robinson (ATL)	(United States) Durkin (DC) (Nigeria) Nwobodo (CIN) (Germany) Tillman (LAFC) (United States) O. Wolff (ATX)	(United States) **Wiley** (ATL) (Gabon) Bouanga (LAFC) (Argentina) Espinoza (SJ)	(United States) Callender (MIA) (United States) Ibeagha (DAL) (Republic of Ireland) Gallagher (ATX) (United States) A. Morris (CLB) (United States) Parks (NYC) (United States) Stroud (STL) (Canada) Shaffelburg (NSH) (Argentina) Torres (PHI) (Brazil) Brenner (CIN)	(South Africa) Bradley Carnell (STL)
4	(Netherlands) Paes (DAL)	(Ghana) Afful (CLT) (United States) Kessler (NE) (Mexico) Tapias (MIN) (Canada) Laryea (TOR)	(Mexico) Herrera (HOU) (Venezuela) J. Moreno (CIN) (Argentina) **Almada** (ATL)	(Honduras) Quioto (MTL) (Brazil) Klauss (STL) (Belgium) Vanzeir (RBNY)	(United States) McCarthy (LAFC) (United States) Blackmon (VAN) (United States) Nerwinski (STL) (Uruguay) S. Rodríguez (NYC) (Brazil) Luquinhas (RBNY) (United States) Wiley (ATL) (Italy) Bernardeschi (TOR) (Argentina) Bou (NE) (Denmark) Uhre (PHI)	(Italy) Christian Lattanzio (CLT)
5	(United States) Stuver (ATX)	(United States) W. Sands (CLB) (Colombia) Terán (CHI) (Canada) Marshall-Rutty (TOR)	(Brazil) Chú (SEA) (United States) Buck (NE) (Germany) Tillman (LAFC) (Argentina) Ojeda (ORL)	(United States) **J. Morris** (SEA) (Brazil) Klauss (STL) (United States) Ramirez (CLB)	(Switzerland) Bürki (STL) (United States) Miazga (CIN) (Argentina) Negri (MIA) (United States) A. Morris (CLB) (Brazil) Artur (HOU) (United States) Gutiérrez (CHI) (United States) Becher (VAN) (United States) Vazquez (CIN) (Gabon) Bouanga (LAFC)	(South Africa) Bradley Carnell (STL)
6	(Canada) St. Clair (MIN)	(Colombia) Mosquera (CIN) (Norway) Glesnes (PHI) (United States) Zimmerman (NSH)	(Armenia) Zelarayán (CLB) (United States) A. Morris (CLB) (Germany) Mukhtar (NSH) (Poland) Jóźwiak (CLT)	(Brazil) Chú (SEA) (United States) **Becher** (VAN) (Argentina) Espinoza (SJ)	(Switzerland) Frei (SEA) (New Zealand) Boxall (MIN) (Argentina) Barreal (CIN) (Canada) Ahmed (VAN) (Spain) Gil (NE) (Italy) Bernardeschi (TOR) (United States) J. Morris (SEA) (Ivory Coast) Boli (POR) (Greece) Giakoumakis (ATL)	(France) Wilfried Nancy (CLB)
7	(Slovenia) Ivačič (POR)	(Argentina) Escobar (HOU) (United States) Miazga (CIN) (Canada) Farsi (CLB)	(Venezuela) Savarino (RSL) (United States) Atencio (SEA) (Spain) Gil (NE) (United States) Gressel (VAN)	(Morocco) Bassi (HOU) (Sierra Leone) Kamara (CHI) (Gabon) **Bouanga** (LAFC)	(United States) Callender (MIA) (Brazil) Rodrigues (SJ) (Spain) Palencia (LAFC) (Canada) Kaye (TOR) (Argentina) Ruiz (RSL) (Armenia) Zelarayán (CLB) (Argentina) Almada (ATL) (United States) Ferreira (DAL) (Chile) Rubio (COL)	(United States) Steve Cherundolo (LAFC)
8	(Japan) Takaoka (VAN)	(United States) Farfan (DAL) (Luxembourg) Chanot (NYC) (Canada) Laryea (TOR)	(Colombia) Moreno (POR) (Germany) Löwen (STL) (Hungary) Gazdag (PHI) (United States) Stroud (STL)	(Colombia) Asprilla (POR) (United States) Ebobisse (SJ) (Mexico) **Vela** (LAFC)	(United States) Schulte (CLB) (France) Marie (SJ) (Colombia) Mosquera (POR) (Ghana) Blessing (NE) (England) O'Brien (DC) (United States) Ledezma (NYC) (Spain) Puig (LAG) (Colombia) Vargas (CLT) (United States) McGuire (ORL)	(Venezuela) Giovanni Savarese (POR)
9	(Switzerland) Bürki (STL)	(Argentina) Barreal (CIN) (United States) Pines (DC) (United States) Steres (HOU)	(Colombia) A. Gómez (RSL) (Canada) Choinière (MTL) (Brazil) Paulo (SEA) (Spain) Puig (LAG)	(Albania) Vrioni (NE) (Denmark) **Uhre** (PHI) (Uruguay) S. Rodríguez (NYC)	(United States) Barraza (NYC) (Germany) Wagner (PHI) (United States) Lennon (ATL) (Honduras) Acosta (COL) (Canada) Osorio (TOR) (Poland) Świderski (CLT) (Brazil) Santos (CIN) (Belgium) Benteke (DC) (Gabon) Bouanga (LAFC)	(England) Wayne Rooney (DC)
10	(Japan) Takaoka (VAN)	(United States) Tolkin (RBNY) (Colombia) Mosquera (CIN) (United States) Zimmerman (NSH) (Canada) Laryea (TOR)	(Brazil) Evander (POR) (Canada) Choinière (MTL) (Germany) Mukhtar (NSH) (Uruguay) Torres (ORL)	(Ecuador) **Campana** (MIA) (Belgium) Benteke (DC)	(Serbia) Petrović (NE) (Iceland) Pálsson (DC) (Argentina) Negri (MIA) (Colombia) Vera (RSL) (Paraguay) Paredes (POR) (Armenia) Zelarayán (CLB) (Argentina) Espinoza (SJ) (Austria) Kara (ORL) (United States) Sapong (TOR)	(England) Phil Neville (MIA)
11	(United States) Clark (HOU)	(United States) Jones (NE) (Jamaica) Lowe (PHI) (United States) Herrera (MTL)	(Argentina) Espinoza (SJ) (Republic of Ireland) Ronan (COL) (Germany) Thommy (SKC) (Germany) **Mukhtar** (NSH)	(Venezuela) Martínez (MIA) (United States) White (VAN) (Argentina) Copetti (CLT)	(Jamaica) Blake (PHI) (France) Camacho (MTL) (Ghana) Abubakar (COL) (Argentina) Barreal (CIN) (United States) Buck (NE) (United States) Wolff (ATX) (Argentina) Acosta (CIN) (Scotland) Gauld (VAN) (Brazil) Evander (POR)	(United States) Luchi Gonzalez (SJ)
12	(United States) McCarthy (LAFC)	(Germany) Wagner (PHI) (United States) Campbell (MTL) (El Salvador) A. Roldán (SEA)	(Switzerland) Shaqiri (CHI) (Spain) Puig (LAG) (Brazil) **Evander** (POR) (United States) Fernandez (RBNY)	(Hungary) Sallói (SKC) (Gabon) Bouanga (LAFC) (Iraq) Meram (CLT)	(Switzerland) Bürki (STL) (Colombia) Rosero (SKC) (Germany) Czichos (CHI) (United States) Nagbe (CLB) (United States) Gutiérrez (CHI) (United States) Ku-DiPietro (DC) (Argentina) Carranza (PHI) (United States) Ferreira (DAL) (United States) McGuire (ORL)	(Argentina) Hernán Losada (MTL)
13	(Peru) Gallese (ORL)	(Denmark) Amundsen (CLB) (Canada) MacNoughton (NSH) (United States) Lennon (ATL)	(Canada) **Cambridge** (CLT) (United States) Parks (NYC) (Argentina) Acosta (CIN) (South Africa) Hlongwane (MIN)	(United States) Finlay (ATX) (United States) Ferreira (DAL) (Brazil) L. Araújo (ATL)	(Jamaica) Blake (PHI) (Poland) Sobociński (CLT) (Canada) Laryea (TOR) (United States) Tolkin (RBNY) (Nigeria) Nwobodo (CIN) (Argentina) Almada (ATL) (Ghana) Opoku (LAFC) (Scotland) Russell (SKC) (Greece) Giakoumakis (ATL)	(United States) Josh Wolff (ATX)
14	(Switzerland) Bürki (STL)	(United States) Parker (STL) (Colombia) Reyes (RBNY) (New Zealand) Boxall (MIN)	(United States) Vassilev (STL) (Hungary) Gazdag (PHI) (Germany) Mukhtar (NSH) (Argentina) **Acosta** (CIN)	(Belgium) Benteke (DC) (Greece) Giakoumakis (ATL) (Austria) Kara (ORL)	(United States) Celentano (CIN) (Scotland) Wilson (COL) (Spain) Sánchez (LAFC) (Scotland) Gauld (VAN) (Colombia) Obrian (DAL) (South Africa) Hlongwane (MIN) (Switzerland) Haile-Selassie (CHI) (Argentina) Carranza (PHI) (United States) Zardes (ATX)	(Colombia) Óscar Pareja (ORL)
15	(Canada) Sirois (MTL)	(United States) Lovitz (NSH) (United States) Tafari (DAL) (Colombia) Yeimar (SEA) (United States) Smith (ORL)	(Mexico) Herrera (HOU) (Germany) Mukhtar (NSH) (Germany) Löwen (STL)	(Italy) Insigne (TOR) (Argentina) **Carranza** (PHI) (Hungary) Sallói (SKC)	(Switzerland) Frei (SEA) (Jamaica) Lowe (PHI) (United States) Miazga (CIN) (Ghana) Afful (CLT) (United States) Buck (NE) (Germany) Thommy (SKC) (Switzerland) Shaqiri (CHI) (Iraq) Meram (CLT) (United States) Zardes (ATX)	(United States) Jim Curtin (PHI)
16	(Brazil) Daniel (SJ)	(Argentina) Barreal (CIN) (Costa Rica) Cascante (ATX) (Brazil) Calegari (LAG)	(Spain) **Gil** (NE) (Uruguay) Brugman (LAG) (Armenia) Zelarayán (CLB) (United States) Gressel (VAN)	(Hungary) Sallói (SKC) (Colombia) Hernández (CLB) (Nigeria) Ibrahim (MTL)	(United States) Stuver (ATX) (United States) S. Nealis (RBNY) (Argentina) Almada (ATL) (Spain) Puig (LAG) (Scotland) Gauld (VAN) (Israel) Kinda (SKC) (Argentina) Acosta (CIN) (Costa Rica) Lassiter (MTL) (United States) White (VAN)	(United States) Luchi Gonzalez (SJ)
17	(Serbia) Petrović (NE)	(Cameroon) Nouhou (SEA) (United States) Pines (DC) (Canada) Laryea (TOR)	(Colombia) Angulo (ORL) (Germany) Löwen (STL) (Germany) Mukhtar (NSH) (Uruguay) Torres (ORL)	(Argentina) **Carranza** (PHI) (United States) Ramirez (CLB) (Guatemala) Rubin (RSL)	(United States) Beavers (RSL) (Serbia) Veselinović (VAN) (Honduras) Arriaga (MIN) (Poland) Klich (DC) (Germany) Thommy (SKC) (Argentina) Acosta (CIN) (Hungary) Gazdag (PHI) (Armenia) Zelarayán (CLB) (Colombia) Hernández (CLB)	(Colombia) Óscar Pareja (ORL)
18	(United States) Barraza (NYC)	(United States) Gutman (ATL) (United States) Castellanos (SKC) (Argentina) Escobar (HOU)	(Brazil) Costa (LAG) (Mexico) Herrera (HOU) (Spain) Gil (NE) (Uruguay) Torres (ORL)	(United States) Toye (MTL) (Peru) Ruidíaz (SEA) (Mexico) **Pulido** (SKC)	(Netherlands) Paes (DAL) (France) Camacho (MTL) (United States) Parker (STL) (Peru) Trauco (SJ) (United States) A. Morris (CLB) (Ecuador) Gruezo (SJ) (Paraguay) Paredes (POR) (Colombia) Hernández (CLB) (Greece) Giakoumakis (ATL)	(United States) Brendan Burke (HOU)
19	(Brazil) Daniel (SJ)	(United States) Brody (RSL) (United States) J. Sands (NYC) (United States) Long (LAFC) (United States) Moore (NSH)	(Argentina) Ruiz (RSL) (Spain) Gil (NE) (Colombia) D. Chará (POR)	(Mexico) Vela (LAFC) (Argentina) Bou (NE) (Germany) **Mukhtar** (NSH)	(United States) McCarthy (LAFC) (United States) Romney (NE) (Honduras) Maldonado (LAFC) (United States) McCarty (NSH) (Canada) Shaffelburg (NSH) (Romania) Mățan (CLB) (United States) Segal (NYC) (United States) Musovski (RSL) (United States) Ramirez (CLB)	(United States) Steve Cherundolo (LAFC)
20	(United States) Celentano (CIN)	(Ecuador) Palacios (LAFC) (Costa Rica) Cascante (ATX) (United States) Harper (RBNY)	(Brazil) Pereira (NYC) (Argentina) Acosta (CIN) (Venezuela) Andrés Martínez (PHI) (United States) Gutiérrez (CHI)	(Mexico) Pulido (SKC) (Iceland) Úlfarsson (HOU) (Croatia) **Kreilach** (RSL)	(United States) Stuver (ATX) (Italy) Chiellini (LAFC) (Mexico) Herrera (HOU) (United States) Duke (MTL) (United States) Bender (CLT) (United States) Luna (RSL) (Poland) Bogusz (LAFC) (Uruguay) Fagúndez (ATX) (United States) McGuire (ORL)	(United States) Pablo Mastroeni (RSL)
21	(Switzerland) Bürki (STL)	(Republic of Ireland) Williams (DC) (United States) Glad (RSL) (Costa Rica) Cascante (ATX)	(Scotland) **Gauld** (VAN) (United States) Amaya (RBNY) (Poland) Klich (DC) (Germany) Herbers (CHI)	(United States) Adeniran (STL) (United States) Wood (NE) (Argentina) Carranza (PHI)	(Serbia) Petrović (NE) (Luxembourg) Chanot (NYC) (Paraguay) Cubas (VAN) (United States) Parks (NYC) (United States) Luna (RSL) (Argentina) Reynoso (MIN) (Armenia) Zelarayán (CLB) (Brazil) Evander (POR) (Mexico) Vela (LAFC)	(England) Wayne Rooney (DC)
22	(United States) Stuver (ATX)	(Ghana) Yeboah (CLB) (United States) Parker (STL) (United States) Lennon (ATL)	(Israel) Kinda (SKC) (Argentina) Reynoso (MIN) (Argentina) Almada (ATL) (Costa Rica) **Leal** (NSH)	(South Africa) Hlongwane (MIN) (Senegal) Badji (CIN) (Uruguay) Torres (ORL)	(Netherlands) Paes (DAL) (United States) Moore (NSH) (France) Walter (SKC) (Brazil) Costa (LAG) (Argentina) Pellegrini (NYC) (Argentina) Espinoza (SJ) (Ecuador) Julio (RSL) (Argentina) Bou (NE) (Colombia) Hernández (CLB)	(England) Nick Cushing (NYC)
23	(United States) Bono (DC)	(Argentina) Cufré (NYC) (Brazil) Carlos (ORL) (United States) Birnbaum (DC)	(Uruguay) C. Araújo (ORL) (United States) Nagbe (CLB) (United States) Parks (NYC) (Spain) **Puig** (LAG)	(Greece) Fountas (DC) (Ecuador) Campana (MIA) (United States) Boyd (LAG)	(England) Bond (LAG) (Portugal) Santos (DC) (United States) Hollingshead (LAFC) (United States) Cremaschi (MIA) (Peru) Cartagena (ORL) (Argentina) Ojeda (MIA) (United States) Gaines (CLT) (Colombia) Hernández (CLB) (Venezuela) Martínez (MIA)	(United States) Greg Vanney (LAG)
24	(United States) Schulte (CLB)	(United States) Ragen (SEA) (Denmark) Maxsø (COL) (United States) Pineda (CHI)	(Spain) Puig (LAG) (Argentina) Ruiz (RSL) (Argentina) Acosta (CIN) (Argentina) Driussi (ATX)	(Brazil) **Chú** (SEA) (Mexico) Pulido (SKC) (Poland) Świderski (CLT)	(United States) Callender (MIA) (United States) Glad (RSL) (Argentina) Barreal (CIN) (Argentina) Sosa (ATL) (United States) Cremaschi (MIA) (Mexico) Herrera (HOU) (United States) Amaya (RBNY) (Germany) Herbers (CHI) (United States) Jackson (STL)	(United States) Brian Schmetzer (SEA)
25	(Serbia) Petrović (NE)	(Peru) Trauco (SJ) (England) Elliott (PHI) (United States) Hollingshead (LAFC)	(Ecuador) Cifuentes (LAFC) (Nigeria) Nwobodo (CIN) (Switzerland) Shaqiri (CHI) (Hungary) **Gazdag** (PHI)	(Argentina) Espinoza (SJ) (Mexico) Vela (LAFC) (South Africa) Hlongwane (MIN)	(Canada) St. Clair (MIN) (Brazil) Rodrigues (SJ) (Spain) Gil (NE) (Argentina) Almada (ATL) (Scotland) Gauld (VAN) (Scotland) Russell (SKC) (Switzerland) Haile-Selassie (CHI) (Ecuador) Julio (RSL) (Finland) Pukki (MIN)	(England) Adrian Heath (MIN)
26	(Serbia) Petrović (NE)	(United States) Parker (STL) (Canada) Waterman (MTL) (Brazil) Carlos (ORL)	(Spain) Gil (NE) (United States) **Luna** (RSL) (United States) Harkes (NE) (Argentina) Acosta (CIN)	(Venezuela) Savarino (RSL) (Colombia) Asprilla (POR) (Scotland) Gauld (VAN)	(Switzerland) Bürki (STL) (Colombia) Arias (CIN) (Venezuela) Ángel Navarro (CHI) (Venezuela) Andrés Martínez (PHI) (Uruguay) Pereyra (ORL) (Argentina) Reynoso (MIN) (Armenia) Zelarayán (CLB) (United States) Finlay (ATX) (Tanzania) Kamungo (DAL)	(Colombia) Oscar Pareja (ORL)
27	(Brazil) Daniel (SJ)	(United States) Tolkin (RBNY) (Brazil) Rodrigues (SJ) (Argentina) Escobar (HOU)	(Uruguay) Torres (ORL) (Canada) Choinière (MTL) (United States) A. Morris (CLB) (Germany) Löwen (STL) (Italy) Bernardeschi (TOR)	(Greece) **Giakoumakis** (ATL) (United States) Gioacchini (STL)	(Canada) St. Clair (MIN) (Colombia) Reyes (RBNY) (Slovakia) Greguš (MIN) (Panama) Carrasquilla (HOU) (Peru) Cartagena (ORL) (France) Muyumba (ATL) (United States) Baird (HOU) (Colombia) Hernández (CLB) (United States) Adeniran (STL)	(Mexico) Gonzalo Pineda (ATL)
28	(United States) Melia (SKC)	(United States) Tafari (DAL) (United States) Campbell (MTL) (United States) Robinson (ATL)	(Scotland) Gauld (VAN) (Argentina) **Almada** (ATL) (Argentina) Acosta (CIN) (Paraguay) D. Gómez (MIA)	(Scotland) Russell (SKC) (United States) White (VAN) (Uruguay) Torres (ORL)	(United States) Celentano (CIN) (Norway) Glesnes (PHI) (United States) Gressel (CLB) (Serbia) Radoja (SKC) (England) Westwood (CLT) (Nigeria) Aliyu (HOU) (Brazil) Costa (LAG) (Portugal) Silva (ATL) (Argentina) Messi (MIA)	(Argentina) Tata Martino (MIA)
29	(Switzerland) Frei (SEA)	(Argentina) Barreal (CIN) (Canada) Miller (MIA) (Norway) Risa (NYC) (United States) Polster (NE)	(Spain) Puig (LAG) (Argentina) Acosta (CIN) (Mexico) Herrera (HOU) (Argentina) **Reynoso** (MIN)	(Canada) Kerr (TOR) (Colombia) S. Moreno (POR)	(United States) Panicco (NSH) (Ghana) Yaro (STL) (Colombia) Mosquera (POR) (Spain) Coello (TOR) (Cameroon) Anunga (NSH) (Germany) Löwen (STL) (Uruguay) Lodeiro (SEA) (Scotland) Gauld (VAN) (Italy) Insigne (TOR)	(United States) Pat Noonan (CIN)
30	(United States) Callender (MIA)	(Germany) Wagner (PHI) (Colombia) Vera (RSL) (Spain) Alba (MIA)	(Argentina) Chancalay (NE) (Brazil) Evander (POR) (Uruguay) Torres (ORL) (Argentina) Messi (MIA)	(Colombia) **Hernández** (CLB) (Belgium) Benteke (DC) (Mexico) Pulido (SKC)	(Peru) Gallese (ORL) (New Zealand) Boxall (MIN) (Finland) Ring (ATX) (Poland) Klich (DC) (Canada) Arfield (CLT) (Argentina) Almada (ATL) (Scotland) Gauld (VAN) (United States) Ferreira (DAL) (Colombia) Arango (RSL)	(Colombia) Óscar Pareja (ORL)
31	(Brazil) Daniel (SJ)	(Argentina) Bravo (POR) (Brazil) Rodrigues (SJ) (Democratic Republic of the Congo) Mabiala (POR) (United States) Yedlin (MIA)	(Argentina) Farías (MIA) (Spain) Puig (LAG) (Spain) Busquets (MIA) (Spain) Gil (NE)	(Ecuador) **Campana** (MIA) (Argentina) Fragapane (MIN)	(Canada) St. Clair (MIN) (Japan) Yoshida (LAG) (United States) Gonzalez (NE) (Colombia) D. Chará (POR) (United States) Dotson (MIN) (United States) Ku-DiPietro (DC) (Brazil) Evander (POR) (United States) Jackson (STL) (Mexico) Pulido (SKC)	(Argentina) Tata Martino (MIA)
32	(United States) Brady (CHI)	(United States) Baker-Whiting (SEA) (Brazil) Rodrigues (SJ) (United States) Lennon (ATL)	(Gabon) Bouanga (LAFC) (Scotland) Gauld (VAN) (Israel) Kinda (SKC) (Argentina) Ojeda (ORL)	(Gabon) Boupendza (CIN) (Argentina) **Enrique** (ORL) (Chile) Mora (POR)	(Croatia) Kahlina (CLT) (United States) Pines (DC) (United States) Hollingshead (LAFC) (France) Muyumba (ATL) (United States) Bassett (COL) (Argentina) Espinoza (SJ) (Brazil) Klauss (STL) (Ecuador) Campana (MIA) (Colombia) Hernández (CLB)	(Mexico) Gonzalo Pineda (ATL)
33	(Switzerland) Bürki (STL)	(Argentina) Barreal (CIN) (United States) Maher (NSH) (United States) Dorsey (HOU)	(Finland) Taylor (MIA) (Mexico) Herrera (HOU) (Germany) Mukhtar (NSH) (South Africa) Hlongwane (MIN)	(Colombia) Hernández (CLB) (England) **Sharp** (LAG) (United States) Ferreira (DAL)	(Netherlands) Paes (DAL) (Spain) Palencia (LAFC) (Brazil) Paulo (SEA) (Paraguay) Paredes (POR) (Brazil) Pirani (DC) (Spain) Puig (LAG) (United States) Sullivan (PHI) (Argentina) Farías (MIA) (Brazil) Magno (NYC)	(United States) Ben Olsen (HOU)
34	(Peru) Gallese (ORL)	(United States) Tolkin (RBNY) (United States) Glad (RSL) (United States) Davis (SKC)	(Argentina) Almada (ATL) (South Africa) Blom (STL) (Argentina) **Acosta** (CIN) (United States) Fernandez (RBNY)	(Portugal) Silva (ATL) (Belgium) Benteke (DC) (United States) Jasson (NYC)	(United States) Melia (SKC) (Equatorial Guinea) Akapo (SJ) (Venezuela) Bueno (PHI) (Honduras) Ruiz (MIA) (Spain) Gil (NE) (United States) Gutiérrez (CHI) (Colombia) Moreno (POR) (Colombia) Barrios (LAG) (Brazil) Magno (NYC)	(United States) Peter Vermes (SKC)
35	(Jamaica) Blake (PHI)	(Denmark) Maxsø (COL) (Argentina) Avilés (MIA) (United States) Romney (NE)	(Uruguay) Torres (ORL) (Scotland) Gauld (VAN) (Germany) Löwen (STL) (Brazil) Costa (LAG)	(Brazil) **Klauss** (STL) (United States) Vázquez (CIN) (Colombia) Arango (RSL)	(Switzerland) Bürki (STL) (El Salvador) Zavaleta (LAG) (United States) Baker-Whiting (SEA) (Canada) Osorio (TOR) (Poland) Klich (DC) (Colombia) Moreno (POR) (Uruguay) Rodríguez (NYC) (Argentina) Espinoza (SJ) (Greece) Koutsias (CHI)	(United States) Pat Noonan (CIN)
36	(United States) Stuver (ATX)	(Denmark) Amundsen (CLB) (Sweden) Jansson (ORL) (Canada) Laryea (VAN)	(United States) C. Roldan (SEA) (Hungary) Gazdag (PHI) (Switzerland) Shaqiri (CHI) (United States) Amaya (RBNY)	(Poland) Świderski (CLT) (Gabon) **Bouanga** (LAFC) (Scotland) Gauld (VAN)	(Jamaica) Blake (PHI) (Finland) Lappalainen (MTL) (Paraguay) Giménez (CHI) (Brazil) Paulo (SEA) (Argentina) Driussi (ATX) (Switzerland) Haile-Selassie (CHI) (Uruguay) Rossi (CLB) (Argentina) Chancalay (NE) (United States) McGuire (ORL)	(United States) Frank Klopas (CHI)
37	(Japan) Takaoka (VAN)	(Argentina) Barreal (CIN) (United States) Robinson (ATL) (United States) Duncan (RBNY)	(Spain) Gil (NE) (Canada) Choinière (MTL) (England) Westwood (CLT) (Brazil) Luquinhas (RBNY)	(Gabon) Bouanga (LAFC) (Finland) **Pukki** (MIN) (Colombia) Quiñónes (HOU)	(United States) Willis (NSH) (Jamaica) Lowe (PHI) (Germany) Thommy (SKC) (Poland) Klich (DC) (Mexico) Herrera (HOU) (Colombia) Angulo (ORL) (South Africa) Hlongwane (MIN) (Ghana) Opoku (MTL) (Colombia) Hernández (CLB)	(Italy) Christian Lattanzio (CLT)
38	(Croatia) Kahlina (CLT)	(United States) Tolkin (RBNY) (United States) Ragen (SEA) (United States) Dorsey (HOU)	(Argentina) Espinoza (SJ) (United States) Nagbe (CLB) (United States) Luna (RSL) (Canada) Laryea (VAN)	(United States) Kamungo (DAL) (United States) McGuire (ORL) (Scotland) **Russell** (SKC)	(Paraguay) Coronel (RBNY) (Cape Verde) Moreira (CLB) (Argentina) Barreal (CIN) (Panama) Carrasquilla (HOU) (Colombia) Vargas (CLT) (Hungary) Sallói (SKC) (Argentina) Fernández (NYC) (Greece) Giakoumakis (ATL) (Argentina) Bou (NE)	(United States) Troy Lesesne (RBNY)

=== Goal of the Matchday ===
Goal of the Matchday
Matchday	Player	Club	Ref.
1	(Argentina) Thiago Almada	Atlanta United FC	
2	(Finland) Robert Taylor	Inter Miami CF	
3	(Republic of Ireland) Jon Gallagher	Austin FC	
4	(Argentina) Thiago Almada	Atlanta United FC	
5	(Brazil) João Klauss	St. Louis City SC	
6	(Italy) Federico Bernardeschi	Toronto FC	
7	(United States) Josh Atencio	Seattle Sounders FC	
8	(United States) Tyler Boyd	LA Galaxy	
9	(Poland) Karol Świderski	Charlotte FC	
10	(Belgium) Christian Benteke	D.C. United	
11	(Argentina) Claudio Bravo	Portland Timbers	
12	(Brazil) Evander	Portland Timbers	
13	(Greece) Giorgos Giakoumakis	Atlanta United FC	
14	(South Africa) Bongokuhle Hlongwane	Minnesota United FC	
15	(Germany) Eduard Löwen	St. Louis City SC	
16	(United States) Memo Rodríguez	LA Galaxy	
17	(Argentina) Luciano Acosta	FC Cincinnati	
18	(Armenia) Lucas Zelarayán	Columbus Crew	
19	(Argentina) Pablo Ruiz	Real Salt Lake	
20	(Venezuela) José Andrés Martínez	Philadelphia Union	
21	(United States) Justen Glad	Real Salt Lake	
22	(Argentina) Thiago Almada	Atlanta United FC	
23	(United States) Tyler Boyd	LA Galaxy	
24	(Spain) Riqui Puig	LA Galaxy	
25	(Peru) Miguel Trauco	San Jose Earthquakes	
26	(Germany) Eduard Löwen	St. Louis City SC	
27	(United States) Samuel Adeniran	St. Louis City SC	
28	(Argentina) Lionel Messi	Inter Miami CF	
29	(Spain) Riqui Puig	LA Galaxy	
30	(Brazil) Evander	Portland Timbers	
31	(Argentina) Facundo Farías	Inter Miami CF	
32	(Ecuador) Leonardo Campana	Inter Miami CF	
33	(Finland) Robert Taylor	Inter Miami CF	
34	(South Africa) Njabulo Blom	St. Louis City SC	
35	(Poland) Mateusz Klich	D.C. United	
36	(Belgium) Brecht Dejaegere	Charlotte FC	
37	(England) Ashley Westwood	Charlotte FC	
38	(United States) Duncan McGuire	Orlando City SC	

=== Player of the Month ===
Month	Player	Club	Stats	Ref.
February/March	(Argentina) Thiago Almada	Atlanta United FC	4 games played, 4 goals, 4 assists	
April	(Argentina) Cristian Espinoza	San Jose Earthquakes	5 games played, 5 goals, 1 assist	
May	(Germany) Hany Mukhtar	Nashville SC	5 games played, 6 goals, 2 assists	
June	(Mexico) Alan Pulido	Sporting Kansas City	5 games played, 6 goals, 1 assist	
July	(Argentina) Luciano Acosta	FC Cincinnati	4 games played, 3 goals, 4 assists	
August	(Argentina) Luciano Acosta	FC Cincinnati	3 games played, 1 goal, 3 assists	
September	(Colombia) Cucho Hernández	Columbus Crew	5 games played, 8 goals, 1 assist	
October	(Gabon) Denis Bouanga	Los Angeles FC	4 games played, 6 goals, 1 assist	

=== End-of-season awards ===
Award	Winner (club)	Ref.
Most Valuable Player	Luciano Acosta (FC Cincinnati)	
Defender of the Year	Matt Miazga (FC Cincinnati)	
Goalkeeper of the Year	Roman Bürki (St. Louis City SC)	
Coach of the Year	Pat Noonan (FC Cincinnati)	
Young Player of the Year	Thiago Almada (Atlanta United FC)	
Newcomer of the Year	Giorgos Giakoumakis (Atlanta United FC)	
Comeback Player of the Year	Alan Pulido (Sporting Kansas City)	
Golden Boot	Denis Bouanga (Los Angeles FC)	
Audi Goals Drive Progress Impact Award	Alejandro Bedoya (Philadelphia Union)	
Referee of the Year	Victor Rivas	
Assistant Referee of the Year	Ian McKay	
Goal of the Year	Luciano Acosta (FC Cincinnati)	
Save of the Year	Roman Celentano (FC Cincinnati)	

=== MLS Best XI ===
Goalkeeper	Defenders	Midfielders	Forwards	Ref.
(Switzerland) Roman Bürki, St. Louis	(United States) Matt Miazga, Cincinnati (United States) Tim Parker, St. Louis (United States) Walker Zimmerman, Nashville	(Argentina) Luciano Acosta, Cincinnati (Argentina) Thiago Almada, Atlanta (Mexico) Héctor Herrera, Houston (Germany) Hany Mukhtar, Nashville	(Gabon) Denis Bouanga, LAFC (Greece) Giorgos Giakoumakis, Atlanta (Colombia) Cucho Hernández, Columbus	
