= 2023 Charlotte FC season =

Charlotte FC
2023 season
- Sporting Director: Zoran Krneta
- Head coach: Christian Lattanzio
- Major League Soccer: Conference: 9th Overall: 19th
- MLS Cup Playoffs: Wild Card
- U.S. Open Cup: Round of 16
- Leagues Cup: Quarterfinals
- Highest home attendance: 69,345
- Average home league attendance: 36,337
- Biggest win: 4–1 vs South Georgia Tormenta
- Biggest defeat: 0–3 vs Atlanta United FC; 0–3 at D.C. United
Home colors	Away colors

The 2023 Charlotte FC season was the club's second season in Major League Soccer, the top division of soccer in the United States. The team was coached by Christian Lattanzio, who took over as interim manager during the inaugural season and became permanent head coach in October 2022. Charlotte FC earned their first MLS Cup Playoffs berth in team history, but lost in the wild card round to the New York Red Bulls. Lattanzio was fired at the end of the season.

== Team information ==
=== Squad information ===
Appearances and goals are career totals from all-competitions as of October 9, 2022.

Squad No.	Name	Nationality	Date of birth (age)	Signed from	Signed in	Contract ends	Games played	Goals scored
Goalkeepers
1	Kristijan Kahlina	(Croatia)	July 24, 1992 (age 34)	(Bulgaria) Ludogorets Razgrad	2022	2024	32	0
23	Pablo Sisniega	(Mexico)	July 7, 1995 (age 31)	(United States) Los Angeles FC	2022	Undisclosed	2	0
31	George Marks	(United States)	November 10, 1999 (age 26)	(United States) Clemson Tigers	2022	2023	3	0
Defenders
2	Jan Sobociński	(Poland)	March 20, 1999 (age 27)	(Poland) ŁKS Łódź	2021	Undisclosed	11	0
3	Adam Armour	(United States)	September 27, 2002 (age 23)	(Germany) 1. FC Nürnberg	2021	2023	6	1
4	Guzmán Corujo	(Uruguay)	August 2, 1996 (age 30)	(Uruguay) Nacional	2022	2024	26	1
6	Bill Tuiloma	(New Zealand)	March 27, 1995 (age 31)	(United States) Portland Timbers	2023	2025	0	0
14	Nathan Byrne	(England)	June 5, 1992 (age 34)	(England) Derby County	2022	2024	5	0
24	Jaylin Lindsey	(United States)	March 27, 2000 (age 26)	(United States) Sporting Kansas City	2021	2024	27	0
25	Harrison Afful	(Ghana)	July 24, 1986 (age 40)	(United States) Columbus Crew	2022	2023	24	1
28	Joseph Mora	(Costa Rica)	January 15, 1993 (age 33)	(United States) D.C. United	2021	2023	25	0
29	Adilson Malanda	(France)	October 29, 2001 (age 24)	(France) Rodez	2022	2025	6	0
Midfielders
7	Kamil Jóźwiak	(Poland)	April 22, 1998 (age 28)	(England) Derby County	2022	2025	22	0
8	Ashley Westwood	(England)	April 1, 1990 (age 36)	(England) Burnley F.C.	2023	2024	0	0
13	Brandt Bronico	(United States)	June 20, 1995 (age 31)	(United States) Chicago Fire	2020	2025	37	1
15	Ben Bender	(United States)	October 3, 2001 (age 24)	(United States) Maryland Terrapins	2022	Undisclosed	31	3
19	Chris Hegardt	(United States)	January 6, 2002 (age 24)	(United States) Georgetown Hoyas	2022	2023	3	0
20	Derrick Jones	(United States)	March 3, 1997 (age 29)	(United States) Houston Dynamo	2022	2023	19	1
77	Nuno Santos	(Portugal)	March 2, 1999 (age 27)	(Portugal) Benfica B	2022	2024	4	1
Forwards
9	Enzo Copetti	(Argentina)	January 16, 1996 (age 30)	(Argentina) Racing Club	2023	2025	0	0
11	Karol Świderski	(Poland)	January 23, 1997 (age 29)	(Greece) PAOK	2022	2025	30	10
16	Andre Shinyashiki	(Brazil)	June 11, 1997 (age 29)	(United States) Colorado Rapids	2022	2025	23	7
17	McKinze Gaines	(United States)	March 2, 1998 (age 28)	(United States) Austin FC	2021	2023	27	3
18	Kerwin Vargas	(Colombia)	January 2, 2002 (age 24)	(Portugal) C.D. Feirense	2022	2024	14	0
21	Vinicius Mello	(Brazil)	August 2, 2002 (age 24)	(Brazil) Internacional	2022	2025	0	0

== Roster transactions ==
=== In ===
#	Pos.	Player	Signed from	Details	Date	Source
36	MF	(United States) Brandon Cambridge	(United States) University of Portland	Free agent	December 21, 2022	
8	MF	(England) Ashley Westwood	(England) Burnley	Free transfer	January 27, 2023	
9	FW	(Argentina) Enzo Copetti	(Argentina) Racing Club	Undisclosed fee	January 11, 2023	
6	DF	(New Zealand) Bill Tuiloma	(United States) Portland Timbers	$800,000 GAM	February 16, 2023	
22	FW	(Iraq) Justin Meram	(United States) Real Salt Lake	$200,000 GAM	April 27, 2023	

=== Out ===
#	Pos.	Player	To	Details	Date	Source
22	DF	(Austria) Christian Fuchs	Retirement	Option declined	October 17, 2022	
35	MF	(United States) Quinn McNeill	Free agent	Option declined	November 14, 2022	
36	DF	(United States) Koa Santos	(United States) Loudoun United	Option declined	November 14, 2022	
8	MF	(Ecuador) Jordy Alcívar	(Ecuador) Independiente del Valle	Undisclosed Fee	November 24, 2022	
12	FW	(Mexico) Daniel Ríos	(Mexico) C.D. Guadalajara	Undisclosed Fee	December 25, 2022	
30	GK	(Mexico) Adrian Zendejas	(United States) Miami FC	Loan out	January 17, 2023	
5	DF	(England) Anton Walkes	None	Deceased	January 19, 2023	
26	FW	(Peru) Yordy Reyna	(Russia) Torpedo Moscow	Contract buyout	February 17, 2023	
3	DF	(United States) Adam Armour	(United States) FC Tulsa	Waived	April 26, 2023	

=== SuperDraft picks ===
Round	Selection	Position	Player	College	Notes
1	1	DF	(Senegal) Hamady Diop	Clemson	Generation Adidas
1	12	FW	(United States) Patrick Agyemang	Rhode Island	
2	11	FW	(United States) Nick Scardina	Washington	
3	11	MF	(United States) Andrew Privett	Penn State	

== Competitions ==
=== Exhibitions ===
Charlotte has been announced to be participating in the 2023 edition of the Coachella Valley Invitational.

January 21	Charlotte FC	Cancelled	St. Louis City SC	Fort Lauderdale, Florida
Note: Cancelled following the death of Anton Walkes.

January 28	LA Galaxy	1–1	Charlotte FC	California
	Puig (pen.)	Match announcement Puig goal

Febaruary 1 Coachella Valley Invitational	Charlotte FC	3–2	D.C. United	Indio, California
	Vargas 5'; Gaines 39'; Świderski 54'	Report	Benteke 3'; Durkin 42'	Stadium: Empire Polo Club

Febaruary 4 Coachella Valley Invitational	Charlotte FC	1–1	Vancouver Whitecaps FC	Indio, California
	Hasal 65' (o.g.)	Report	Becher 85'	Stadium: Empire Polo Club

February 11	Charlotte FC	3–0	Charleston Battery	Charlotte, North Carolina
	Copetti 55'; Bender 68'; Santos 73'	Report		Stadium: Bank of America Stadium

February 18	Charlotte FC	3–2	Birmingham Legion FC	Charlotte, North Carolina
	Jóźwiak 11'; Świderski 26'; Copetti 34'	Report		Stadium: Bank of America Stadium

=== Major League Soccer season ===
==== Eastern Conference ====
MLS Eastern Conference table (2023)
Pos	Team	Pld	W	L	T	GF	GA	GD	Pts	Qualification
7	Nashville SC	34	13	11	10	39	32	+7	49	Qualification for round one
8	New York Red Bulls	34	11	13	10	36	39	−3	43	Qualification for the wild-card round
9	Charlotte FC	34	10	11	13	45	52	−7	43	Qualification for the wild-card round
10	CF Montréal	34	12	17	5	36	52	−16	41	
11	New York City FC	34	9	11	14	35	39	−4	41	

Source: MLS
Rules for classification: 1) points; 2) total wins; 3) total goal differential; 4) total goals scored; 5) fewer disciplinary points; 6) away goal differential; 7) away goals scored; 8) home goals differential; 9) home goals scored; 10) coin toss (2 clubs tied) or drawing of lots (≥3 clubs tied)

==== Overall ====
Overall MLS standings table
Pos	Team	Pld	W	L	T	GF	GA	GD	Pts
17	New York Red Bulls	34	11	13	10	36	39	−3	43
18	Portland Timbers	34	11	13	10	46	58	−12	43
19	Charlotte FC	34	10	11	13	45	52	−7	43
20	CF Montréal	34	12	17	5	36	52	−16	41
21	Minnesota United FC	34	10	13	11	46	51	−5	41

Source: MLS
Rules for classification: 1) points; 2) total wins; 3) total goal differential; 4) total goals scored; 5) fewer disciplinary points; 6) away goal differential; 7) away goals scored; 8) home goals differential; 9) home goals scored; 10) coin toss (2 clubs tied) or drawing of lots (≥3 clubs tied)

==== Results summary ====
Overall								Home						Away					
Pld	W	D	L	GF	GA	GD	Pts	W	D	L	GF	GA	GD	W	D	L	GF	GA	GD
34	10	13	11	45	52	−7	43	6	8	3	24	21	+3	4	5	8	21	31	−10

Updated to match(es) played on October 25, 2023.

==== Matches ====
February 25 1	Charlotte FC	0–1	New England Revolution	Charlotte, North Carolina
7:30 PM EST	Byrne (yellow card) 28'	Report	Kessler (yellow card) 26' (goal) 89'	Stadium: Bank of America Stadium; Attendance: 69,345; Referee: Rubiel Vazquez

March 4 2	St. Louis City SC	3–1	Charlotte FC	St Louis, Missouri
7:30 PM CST	Tuiloma 41' (o.g.); Hiebert (yellow card) 43'; Parker (yellow card) 45'; Löwen 45+5' (pen.); Stroud (yellow card) 61'; Klauss 71'	Report	Copetti 25'; Malanda (yellow card) 39'; Westwood (yellow card) 45+1'; Swiderski (yellow card) 45+4'; Shinyashiki (yellow card) 64'; Byrne (yellow card) 87'	Stadium: Citypark; Attendance: 22,423; Referee: Ted Unkel

March 11 3	Charlotte FC	0–3	Atlanta United FC	Charlotte, North Carolina
12:25 EST	Copetti (yellow card) 90'	Report	Wiley 5', 45+2' (yellow card) 69'; Araújo 12'; Berry (yellow card) 26'; Sejdić (yellow card) 35'; Purata (yellow card) 85'	Stadium: Bank of America Stadium; Attendance: 31,538; Referee: Ismail Elfath

March 18 4	Orlando City SC	1–2	Charlotte FC	Orlando, Florida
7:30 PM EDT	Ojeda 57'	Report	Copetti 26', (yellow card) 80'; Afful (yellow card) 28'; Vargas 37'; Marks (yellow card) 69'; Bronico (yellow card) 76'; Jóźwiak (yellow card) 77'	Stadium: Exploria Stadium; Attendance: 18,123; Referee: Armando Villarreal

March 25 5	Charlotte FC	1–1	New York Red Bulls	Charlotte, North Carolina
7:30 PM EDT	Santos (yellow card) 36'; Copetti (yellow card) 62'; Jones (yellow card) 64'; Reyes 74' (o.g.)	Report	Manoel 43' (yellow card) 56'; D. Nealis (yellow card) 45+3'; Tolkin (yellow card) 63'; Duncan (yellow card) 80'	Stadium: Bank of America Stadium; Attendance: 32,540; Referee: Marcos de Oliveira

April 1 6	Toronto FC	2–2	Charlotte FC	Toronto, Ontario
7:30 PM EDT	Bernardeschi 6' (yellow card) 67'; Bradley 44'; Rosted (yellow card) 11'; Hedges (yellow card) 41'	Report	Bender 51'; Jóźwiak 70'; Copetti (yellow card) 90+2'; Hegardt (yellow card) 90+3'	Stadium: BMO Field; Attendance: 22,801; Referee: Ramy Touchan

April 8 7	Real Salt Lake	3–1	Charlotte FC	Sandy, Utah
7:30 PM MDT	Vera (yellow card) 23'; Ruiz 56' (yellow card) 57'; Julio 59'; Savarino 62'; Glad (yellow card) 70'	Report	Bender (yellow card) 13'; Świderski 27'; Afful (yellow card) 42'; Jóźwiak (yellow card) 48'	Stadium: America First Field; Attendance: 17,506; Referee: Fotis Bazakos

April 15 8	Charlotte FC	2–2	Colorado Rapids	Charlotte, North Carolina
7:30 PM EDT	Jones (yellow card) 50'; Vargas 62'; Jóźwiak 65'	Report	Abubakar (yellow card) 2'; Rubio (yellow card) 45+2'; Max (yellow card) 52' (goal) 54'; Yapi (yellow card) 64'; Acosta (yellow card) 88'; Barrios 90+1'	Stadium: Bank of America Stadium; Attendance: 31,240; Referee: Guido Gonzales Jr.

April 22 9	Charlotte FC	1–0	Columbus Crew	Charlotte, North Carolina
7:30 PM EDT	Świderski 37'; Jones (yellow card) 45+4'	Report	Yeboah (yellow card) 75'	Stadium: Bank of America Stadium; Attendance: 30,468; Referee: Jon Freemon

April 29 10	D.C. United	3–0	Charlotte FC	Washington, D.C.
7:30 PM EDT	Najar (yellow card) 9'; Fountas 34' (pen.); Benteke (yellow card) 43' (goal) 75'; Greene 90+5'	Report	Jones (yellow card) 63'; Gaines (yellow card) 74'	Stadium: Audi Field; Attendance: 19,215; Referee: Ismir Pekmic

May 6 11	Charlotte FC	3–2	New York City FC	Charlotte, North Carolina
7:30 PM EDT	Jones (yellow card) 2'; Copetti 8', 39' (yellow card) 66'; Meram (yellow card) 14'; Ledezma 74' (o.g.)	Report	Ledezma (yellow card) 14'; Pereira 37'; Rodríguez 57' (pen.)	Stadium: Bank of America Stadium; Attendance: 30,454; Referee: Chris Penso

May 13 12	Atlanta United FC	1–3	Charlotte FC	Atlanta, Georgia
7:30 PM EDT	Gutman (red card) 51'; Ibarra (yellow card) 71'; Purata 86'; Lennon (yellow card) 87'	Report	Meram 18', 57'; Świderski 52' (pen.); Sobocinski (yellow card) 59'	Stadium: Mercedes-Benz Stadium; Attendance: 43,427; Referee: Lukasz Szpala

May 17 13	Charlotte FC	2–1	Chicago Fire FC	Charlotte, North Carolina
7:30 PM EDT	Malanda (yellow card) 45+1'; Kahlina (yellow card) 55'; Cambridge 68', 81'; Świderski (yellow card) 80'; Jones (yellow card) 87'; Sobociński (yellow card) 88'	Report	Giménez (yellow card) 20'; Przybyłko 29'; Gutiérrez (yellow card) 39'; Torres (yellow card) 72'; Koutsias (yellow card) 90+1'	Stadium: Bank of America Stadium; Attendance: 29,016; Referee: Tori Penso

May 20 14	Charlotte FC	1–2	Nashville SC	Charlotte, North Carolina
7:30 PM EDT	Bronico 6', (yellow card) 54'; Byrne (yellow card) 11'	Report	Bunbury (yellow card) 34'; Mukhtar 39', 90+3' (pen.); McCarty (yellow card) 69'	Stadium: Bank of America Stadium; Attendance: 30,526; Referee: Rubiel Vazquez

May 27 15	LA Galaxy	0–1	Charlotte FC	Carson, California
7:30 PM PDT	Hernández (yellow card) 46' (yellow-red card) 85'	Report	Afful (yellow card) 56'; Świderski 73'; Vargas (yellow card) 79'	Stadium: Dignity Health Sports Park; Attendance: 17,434; Referee: Drew Fischer

May 31 16	Philadelphia Union	1–0	Charlotte FC	Chester, Pennsylvania
7:30 PM EDT	Lowe (yellow card) 59'; Kahlina 70' (o.g.)	Report	Westwood (yellow card) 12'	Stadium: Subaru Park; Attendance: 18,705; Referee: Ted Unkel

June 3 17	Columbus Crew	4–2	Charlotte FC	Columbus, Ohio
7:30 PM EDT	Ramírez 5', 59'; Arfsten 21'; Hernández 43', (yellow card) 86'	Report	Sobociński (yellow card) 39'; Świderski 56'; Meram 58'; Byrne (yellow card) 78'; Jones (yellow card) 84'	Stadium: Lower.com Field; Attendance: 20,199; Referee: Alex Chilowicz

June 10 18	Charlotte FC	3–3	Seattle Sounders FC	Charlotte, North Carolina
7:30 PM EDT	Lindsey 17'; Westwood 53'; Jones (yellow card) 62'; Vargas (yellow card) 64'; Agyemang (yellow card) 86', (goal) 89'	Report	C. Roldan 11'; Ruidíaz 36', 70'; Nouhou (yellow card) 78'	Stadium: Bank of America Stadium; Attendance: 31,563; Referee: Lukasz Szpala

June 21 19	New York Red Bulls	2–2	Charlotte FC	Harrison, New Jersey
7:30 PM EDT	Nealis (yellow card) 11'; Harper (yellow card) 26', (goal) 58'; Coronel (yellow card) 45+3'; Vanzeir 53', (yellow card) 88'	Report	Bender 13', 19'; Corujo (yellow card) 42'; Lindsey (yellow card) 55'; Bronico (yellow card) 84'; Byrne (yellow card) 89'; Gaines II (yellow card) 90+5'	Stadium: Red Bull Arena; Attendance: 20,000; Referee: Sergii Boiko

June 24 20	Charlotte FC	0–0	CF Montréal	Charlotte, North Carolina
7:30 PM EDT	Świderski (yellow card) 30'; Vargas (yellow card) 50'; Copetti (yellow card) 58'	Report		Stadium: Bank of America Stadium; Attendance: 18,032; Referee: Mark Allatin

July 5 21	New York City FC	1–1	Charlotte FC	New York, New York
7:30 PM EDT	Haak (yellow card) 58'; Cufré 81'; Parks (yellow card) 88'	Report	Gaines II 17'; Świderski (yellow card) 58'; Tuiloma (yellow card) 90+2'	Stadium: Citi Field; Attendance: 15,122; Referee: Filip Dujic

July 8 22	Charlotte FC	2–2	FC Cincinnati	Charlotte, North Carolina
7:30 PM EDT	Świderski 14', 24', (yellow card) 90+3'; Corujo (yellow card) 27'; Lindsey (yellow card) 45+2'; Arfield (yellow card) 69'; Jóźwiak (yellow card) 89'	Report	Mosquera (yellow card) 11'; Acosta 52'; Santos (yellow card) 57'; Barreal 68'; Murphy (yellow card) 29' (yellow-red card) 75'	Stadium: Bank of America Stadium; Attendance: 43,613; Referee: Ted Unkel

July 15 23	CF Montréal	2–0	Charlotte FC	Montréal, Quebec
7:30 PM EDT	Opoku 29'; Offor 31'	Report	Agyemang (yellow card) 54'; Tuiloma (yellow card) 60'; Sobociński (yellow card) 85'	Stadium: Saputo Stadium; Attendance: 18,413; Referee: Pierre-Luc Lauziere

August 26 24	Charlotte FC	2–1	Los Angeles FC	Charlotte, North Carolina
7:30 PM EDT	Malanda (yellow card) 8'; Świderski (yellow card) 13'; Westwood 29'; Arfield 75'; Bronico (yellow card) 90+6'	Report	Tillman (yellow card) 19'; González 67'	Stadium: Bank of America Stadium; Attendance: 37,809; Referee: Victor Rivas

August 30 25	Charlotte FC	1–1	Orlando City SC	Charlotte, North Carolina
7:30 PM EDT	Jones (yellow card) 72'; Copetti 81' (pen.), (yellow card) 90+5'	Report	Martins (yellow card) 68'; Araújo (yellow card) 75'; Ojeda 88'	Stadium: Bank of America Stadium; Attendance: 27,236; Referee: Rosendo Mendoza

September 2 26	Nashville SC	1–1	Charlotte FC	Nashville, Tennessee
7:30 PM CDT	Mukhtar (yellow card) 26', (goal) 90+8' (pen.); McCarty (yellow card) 56'; Godoy (yellow card) 73'; Bunbury (yellow card) 90+2'	Report	Jones (yellow card) 27'; Malanda (yellow card) 89'; Arfield 90+3'; Byrne (yellow card) 90+6'	Stadium: Geodis Park; Attendance: 27,902; Referee: Alex Chilowicz

September 16 27	Charlotte FC	0–0	D.C. United	Charlotte, North Carolina
7:30 PM EDT		Report	Canouse (yellow card) 33'; Ruan (yellow card) 70'; Hines-Ike (yellow card) 75'	Stadium: Bank of America Stadium; Attendance: 36,101; Referee: Jon Freemon

September 20 28	Charlotte FC	2–2	Philadelphia Union	Charlotte, North Carolina
7:30 PM EDT	Meram 55'; Świderski 61'; Jóźwiak (yellow card) 89'; Westwood (yellow card) 90+1'; Agyemang (yellow card) 90+10'	Report	Martínez (yellow card) 52'; Sullivan 70'; Gazdag 90+7'	Stadium: Bank of America Stadium; Attendance: 28,584; Referee: Guido Gonzales Jr.

September 23 29	FC Cincinnati	3–0	Charlotte FC	Cincinnati, Ohio
7:30 PM EDT	Barreal 45+1'; Boupendza 50'; Acosta 78'	Report	Westwood (yellow card) 35'; Kahlina (yellow card) 45+3'	Stadium: TQL Stadium; Attendance: 25,513; Referee: Jair Marrufo

September 30 30	New England Revolution	2–1	Charlotte FC	Foxborough, Massachusetts
7:30 PM EDT	Nacho Gil (yellow card) 28'; Buck 64'; Romney 85'	Report	Westwood (yellow card) 37'; Świderski (yellow card) 45+2', (goal) 84'	Stadium: Gillette Stadium; Attendance: 37,701; Referee: Lukasz Szpala

October 4 31	Charlotte FC	3–0	Toronto FC	Charlotte, North Carolina
7:30 PM EDT	Świderski 8' (pen.), 45+2' (pen.); Dejaegere 56'	Report	Bradley (yellow card) 26'; Mbongue (yellow card) 45+6'	Stadium: Bank of America Stadium; Attendance: 30,080; Referee: Malik Badawi

October 7 32	Chicago Fire FC	0–2	Charlotte FC	Chicago, Illinois
7:30 PM CDT	Giménez (yellow card) 61'; Terán (yellow card) 80'	Report	Westwood 23'; Świderski 58' (pen.); Jones (yellow card) 90+3'; Jóźwiak (yellow card) 90+6'	Stadium: Soldier Field; Attendance: 18,308; Referee: Natalie Simon

October 18 33	Inter Miami CF	2–2	Charlotte FC	Fort Lauderdale, Florida
8:00 PM EDT	Busquets (yellow card) 21'; Stefanelli 45+6'; Gregore (yellow card) 49'; Avilés (yellow card) 76'; Robinson 84'	Report	Copetti 45'; Vargas 52'; Bronico (yellow card) 69'	Stadium: DRV PNK Stadium; Attendance: 20,344; Referee: Lukasz Szpala
Note: The match was originally scheduled for August 20, but was postponed due to Inter Miami CF's participation in the Leagues Cup final.

October 21 34	Charlotte FC	1–0	Inter Miami CF	Charlotte, North Carolina
6:00 PM EDT	Westwood (yellow card) 4'; Vargas 13', (yellow card) 61'; Malanda (yellow card) 24'; Meram (yellow card) 88'	Report	Gregore (yellow card) 18'; Miller (yellow card) 90+3'	Stadium: Bank of America Stadium; Attendance: 66,101; Referee: Guido Gonzales Jr.

=== MLS Cup Playoffs ===
October 25 Wild Card	New York Red Bulls	5–2	Charlotte FC	Harrison, New Jersey
7:30 pm EDT	Manoel 10', 37', 78'; Tolkin 26'; Barlow 56'	Report	Malanda (yellow card) 25'; Copetti (yellow card) 33'; Vargas 49'; Agyemang 64'	Stadium: Red Bull Arena; Attendance: 16,074; Referee: Ismail Elfath

=== U.S. Open Cup ===
Charlotte FC will enter the 2023 edition of the U.S. Open Cup in the third round.

April 25 Third Round	Charlotte FC (MLS)	4–1	South Georgia Tormenta FC (USL1)	Matthews, North Carolina
7:30 PM EDT	Jóźwiak 24'; Bronico (yellow card) 41'; Copetti 55'; Jones 65'; Świderski 84'; Cambridge (yellow card) 90+3' (yellow-red card) 90+4'	Report	Mason (yellow card) 44' (yellow-red card) 48'; Cassini 83'	Stadium: Sportsplex at Matthews; Attendance: 3,568; Referee: Jervis Atagana

May 9 Round of 32	Charlotte FC (MLS)	1–0	Orlando City SC (MLS)	Matthews, North Carolina
7:00 PM EDT	Bronico (yellow card) 18'; Bender (yellow card) 51'; Jóźwiak 70'	Report	Araújo (yellow card) 27'; Schlegel (yellow card) 74'; Jansson (yellow card) 78'	Stadium: Sportsplex at Matthews; Attendance: 4,024; Referee: Guido Gonzales Jr.

May 24 Round of 16	Birmingham Legion FC (USLC)	1–0	Charlotte FC (MLS)	Birmingham, Alabama
8:00 PM EDT	Kasim 60'; Alves (yellow card) 90+4'	Report	Malanda (yellow card) 28' (yellow-red card) 51'; Westwood (yellow card) 84'	Stadium: Protective Stadium; Attendance: 12,722; Referee: Guido Gonzales Jr.

=== Leagues Cup ===
Charlotte FC will make their debut in the Leagues Cup. On January 20, the groups for the tournament were determined with Charlotte drawn into Group South 4. This group also contains FC Dallas and Necaxa.

==== South 4 ====
Pos	Team	Pld	W	PW	PL	L	GF	GA	GD	Pts	Qualification	CLT	DAL	NEC
1	(United States) Charlotte FC	2	1	1	0	0	6	3	+3	5	Advance to knockout stage	—	—	—
2	(United States) FC Dallas	2	1	0	1	0	5	2	+3	4	Advance to knockout stage	2–2	—	3–0
3	(Mexico) Necaxa	2	0	0	0	2	1	7	−6	0		1–4	—	—

Source: Leagues Cup
Rules for classification: Tiebreakers

July 21, 2023 Group Stage	FC Dallas (United States)	2–2 (1–4 p)	(United States) Charlotte FC	Frisco, Texas
7:30 PM CDT	Kamungo 45'; Jesus (yellow card) 69'; Lletget 75'	Report	Arfield (yellow card) 52'; Privett (yellow card) 55'; Świderski 61' (pen.); Westwood (yellow card) 68'; Bender 90+7'	Stadium: Toyota Stadium; Attendance: 10,425; Referee: Jorge Abraham Camacho Peregrina
	Penalties
	Lletget (penalty missed); Farfan (penalty missed); Ferreira (penalty scored)		(penalty scored) Świderski; (penalty scored) Bender; (penalty scored) Cambridge; (penalty scored) Agyemang

July 29, 2023 Group Stage	Charlotte FC (United States)	4–1	(Mexico) Necaxa	Charlotte, North Carolina
7:30 PM EDT	Bronico 6'; Meram (yellow card) 21'; Świderski 42'; Byrne (yellow card) 45+1'; Westwood (yellow card) 45+1'; Arfield 45+7'; Malanda (yellow card) 55'; Agyemang 87'	Report	Gutiérrez (yellow card) 19'; Rodríguez (yellow card) 39'; Batista (yellow card) 45+1'; Méndez (red card) 49'; González (yellow card) 59'; Poggi 89'	Stadium: Bank of America Stadium; Attendance: 29,575; Referee: Guido Gonzales

==== Knockout ====
August 3, 2023 Round of 32	Charlotte FC (United States)	0−0 (4−3 p)	(Mexico) Cruz Azul	Frisco, Texas
8:30 pm EDT	Byrne (yellow card) 15'	Report	Antuna (yellow card) 60'; Ditta (yellow card) 74'	Stadium: Toyota Stadium; Attendance: 6,844; Referee: Ismael Cornejo Meléndez
	Penalties
	Swiderski (penalty missed); Bender (penalty scored); Jones (penalty scored); Westwood (penalty missed); Vargas (penalty scored); Privett (penalty scored)		(penalty scored) Rivero; (penalty missed) Antuna; (penalty missed) Rotondi; (penalty scored) Dueñas; (penalty scored) Rodríguez; (penalty missed) Castaño
Note: Match played at neutral site due to scheduling conflicts at Charlotte FC's home stadium Bank of America Stadium and a lack of approved venues in the Charlotte metropolitan area.

August 7, 2023 Round of 16	Houston Dynamo FC (United States)	1–2	(United States) Charlotte FC	Houston, Texas
9:30 pm EDT	Baird 10'; Escobar (yellow card) 90+5'; Ibrahim (yellow card) 90+6'	Report	Agyemang 80'; Micael 81' (o.g.); Byrne (yellow card) 84'	Stadium: Shell Energy Stadium; Attendance: 9,188; Referee: Pierre-Luc Lauziere

August 11, 2023 Quarter-finals	Inter Miami CF (United States)	4–0	(United States) Charlotte FC	Fort Lauderdale, Florida
8:30 pm ET	Martínez 12' (pen.); Taylor 32'; Miller (yellow card) 64'; Malanda 78' (o.g.); Messi 86'	Report	Dejaegere (yellow card) 62'; Westwood (yellow card) 90+1'	Stadium: DRV PNK Stadium; Attendance: 20,368; Referee: Ismail Elfath

== Statistics ==
=== Appearances and goals ===
Numbers after plus-sign(+) denote appearances as a substitute.

No.	Pos	Nat	Player	Total		MLS		MLS Cup		U.S. Open Cup		Leagues Cup	
No.	Pos	Nat	Player	Apps	Goals	Apps	Goals	Apps	Goals	Apps	Goals	Apps	Goals
Goalkeepers
1	GK	(Croatia) CRO	Kristijan Kahlina	33	0	24	0	1	0	3	0	5	0
23	GK	(Mexico) MEX	Pablo Sisniega	3	0	3	0	0	0	0	0	0	0
31	GK	(United States) USA	George Marks	7	0	7	0	0	0	0	0	0	0
Defenders
2	DF	(Poland) POL	Jan Sobociński	17	0	6+7	0	0	0	3	0	1	0
3	DF	(Finland) FIN	Jere Uronen	10	0	7+2	0	1	0	0	0	0	0
4	DF	(Uruguay) URU	Guzmán Corujo	6	0	5+1	0	0	0	0	0	0	0
6	DF	(New Zealand) NZL	Bill Tuiloma	19	0	15+2	0	0	0	1+1	0	0	0
14	DF	(England) ENG	Nathan Byrne	39	0	29+2	0	1	0	0+3	0	4	0
24	DF	(United States) USA	Jaylin Lindsey	29	1	15+6	1	0	0	2+1	0	5	0
25	DF	(Ghana) GHA	Harrison Afful	18	0	11+4	0	0	0	1	0	1+1	0
28	DF	(Costa Rica) CRC	Joseph Mora	5	0	2+2	0	0	0	1	0	0	0
29	DF	(France) FRA	Adilson Malanda	36	0	29	0	1	0	2	0	4	0
32	DF	(Senegal) SEN	Hamady Diop	4	0	0+3	0	0	0	1	0	0	0
Midfielders
7	MF	(Poland) POL	Kamil Jóźwiak	33	4	15+10	2	1	0	1+1	2	5	0
8	MF	(England) ENG	Ashley Westwood	37	3	29	3	1	0	0+2	0	5	0
10	MF	(Belgium) BEL	Brecht Dejaegere	12	1	7+2	1	0+1	0	0	0	0+2	0
13	MF	(United States) USA	Brandt Bronico	41	2	30+2	1	1	0	3	0	5	1
15	MF	(United States) USA	Ben Bender	23	4	11+6	3	0	0	1	0	1+4	1
19	MF	(United States) USA	Chris Hegardt	7	0	0+4	0	0	0	3	0	0	0
20	MF	(United States) USA	Derrick Jones	34	1	20+8	0	0	0	3	1	0+3	0
34	MF	(United States) USA	Andrew Privett	19	0	11+1	0	1	0	0+1	0	5	0
36	MF	(United States) USA	Brandon Cambridge	13	2	0+9	2	0	0	1+1	0	0+2	0
37	MF	(Canada) CAN	Scott Arfield	19	3	2+11	2	0+1	0	0	0	5	1
77	MF	(Portugal) POR	Nuno Santos	5	0	2+3	0	0	0	0	0	0	0
Forwards
9	FW	(Argentina) ARG	Enzo Copetti	29	7	23+3	6	1	0	2	1	0	0
11	FW	(Poland) POL	Karol Świderski	40	15	29+2	12	1	0	1+2	1	5	2
16	FW	(Brazil) BRA	Andre Shinyashiki	5	0	2+3	0	0	0	0	0	0	0
17	FW	(United States) USA	McKinze Gaines	21	1	8+10	1	0+1	0	2	0	0	0
18	FW	(Colombia) COL	Kerwin Vargas	36	5	18+11	4	1	1	1	0	1+4	0
21	FW	(Brazil) BRA	Vinicius Mello	3	0	0+3	0	0	0	0	0	0	0
22	FW	(Iraq) IRQ	Justin Meram	32	4	13+12	4	0+1	0	1+1	0	3+1	0
33	FW	(United States) USA	Patrick Agyemang	18	4	1+11	1	0+1	1	0+1	0	0+4	2

- Last updated: October 25, 2023
- Source: Team Stats

=== Goalscorers ===
Rank	No.	Pos.	Nat.	Name	MLS	MLS Cup	U.S. Open Cup	Leagues Cup	Total
1	11	FW	(Poland)	Karol Świderski	12	0	1	2	15
2	9	FW	(Argentina)	Enzo Copetti	6	0	1	0	7
3	18	FW	(Colombia)	Kerwin Vargas	4	1	0	0	5
4	22	FW	(Iraq)	Justin Meram	4	0	0	0	4
4	15	MF	(United States)	Ben Bender	3	0	0	1	4
4	7	MF	(Poland)	Kamil Jóźwiak	2	0	2	0	4
4	33	FW	(United States)	Patrick Agyemang	1	1	0	2	4
8	8	MF	(England)	Ashley Westwood	3	0	0	0	3
8	37	MF	(Canada)	Scott Arfield	2	0	0	1	3
10	36	MF	(United States)	Brandon Cambridge	2	0	0	0	2
10	13	MF	(United States)	Brandt Bronico	1	0	0	1	2
12	10	MF	(Belgium)	Brecht Dejaegere	1	0	0	0	1
12	17	FW	(United States)	McKinze Gaines	1	0	0	0	1
12	24	DF	(United States)	Jaylin Lindsey	1	0	0	0	1
12	20	MF	(United States)	Derrick Jones	0	0	0	1	1
Own Goals					2	0	0	1	3
Totals					45	2	4	9	60

- Last updated: October 25, 2023
- Source: Competitive matches

=== Assists ===
Rank	No.	Pos.	Nat.	Name	MLS	MLS Cup	U.S. Open Cup	Leagues Cup	Total
1	7	MF	(Poland)	Kamil Jóźwiak	7	0	0	2	9
2	11	FW	(Poland)	Karol Świderski	4	1	1	2	8
3	24	DF	(United States)	Jaylin Lindsey	5	0	0	2	7
3	13	MF	(United States)	Brandt Bronico	4	1	0	2	7
5	18	FW	(Colombia)	Kerwin Vargas	5	0	0	0	5
5	8	MF	(England)	Ashley Westwood	4	0	0	1	5
5	22	FW	(Iraq)	Justin Meram	4	0	0	1	5
8	15	MF	(United States)	Ben Bender	3	0	0	0	3
9	9	FW	(Argentina)	Enzo Copetti	2	0	0	0	2
9	25	DF	(Ghana)	Harrison Afful	2	0	0	0	2
11	6	DF	(New Zealand)	Bill Tuiloma	1	0	0	0	1
11	10	MF	(Belgium)	Brecht Dejaegere	1	0	0	0	1
11	14	DF	(England)	Nathan Byrne	1	0	0	0	1
11	17	FW	(United States)	McKinze Gaines	1	0	0	0	1
11	21	DF	(France)	Adilson Malanda	1	0	0	0	1
11	1	GK	(Croatia)	Kristijan Kahlina	0	1	0	0	1
11	19	MF	(United States)	Chris Hegardt	0	0	1	0	1
11	36	MF	(United States)	Brandon Cambridge	0	0	1	0	1
Totals					45	3	3	10	61

- Last updated: October 25, 2023
- Source: Competitive matches

=== Disciplinary record ===
N	P	Nat.	Name	MLS			MLS Cup			U.S. Open Cup			Leagues Cup			Total			Notes
N	P	Nat.	Name	Yellow card	Second yellow card	Red card	Yellow card	Second yellow card	Red card	Yellow card	Second yellow card	Red card	Yellow card	Second yellow card	Red card	Yellow card	Second yellow card	Red card	Notes
20	MF	(United States)	Derrick Jones	11												11			
14	DF	(England)	Nathan Byrne	7									3			10			
8	MF	(England)	Ashley Westwood	6						1			3			10			
9	FW	(Argentina)	Enzo Copetti	7			1									8			
29	DF	(France)	Adilson Malanda	5			1				1		1			7	1		
13	MF	(United States)	Brandt Bronico	5						2						7			
11	FW	(Poland)	Karol Świderski	6												6			
7	MF	(Poland)	Kamil Jóźwiak	5												5			
2	DF	(Poland)	Jan Sobociński	4												4			
18	FW	(Colombia)	Kerwin Vargas	4												4			
22	FW	(Iraq)	Justin Meram	3									1			4			
17	FW	(United States)	McKinze Gaines	3												3			
24	DF	(United States)	Jaylin Lindsey	3												3			
25	DF	(Ghana)	Harrison Afful	3												3			
33	FW	(United States)	Patrick Agyemang	3												3			
1	GK	(Croatia)	Kristijan Kahlina	2												2			
4	DF	(Uruguay)	Guzmán Corujo	2												2			
6	DF	(New Zealand)	Bill Tuiloma	2												2			
15	MF	(United States)	Ben Bender	1						1						2			
37	MF	(Canada)	Scott Arfield	1									1			2			
16	FW	(Brazil)	Andre Shinyashiki	1												1			
19	MF	(United States)	Chris Hegardt	1												1			
31	GK	(United States)	George Marks	1												1			
77	MF	(Portugal)	Nuno Santos	1												1			
10	MF	(Belgium)	Brecht Dejaegere										1			1			
34	MF	(United States)	Andrew Privett										1			1			
36	MF	(United States)	Brandon Cambridge								1						1		

Last updated: October 15, 2023
Source: Competitive matches
Only competitive matches
(yellow card) = Number of bookings; (second yellow card) = Number of sending offs after a second yellow card; (red card) = Number of sending offs by a direct red card.
