= Kristijan Kahlina =

Croatian footballer (born 1992)

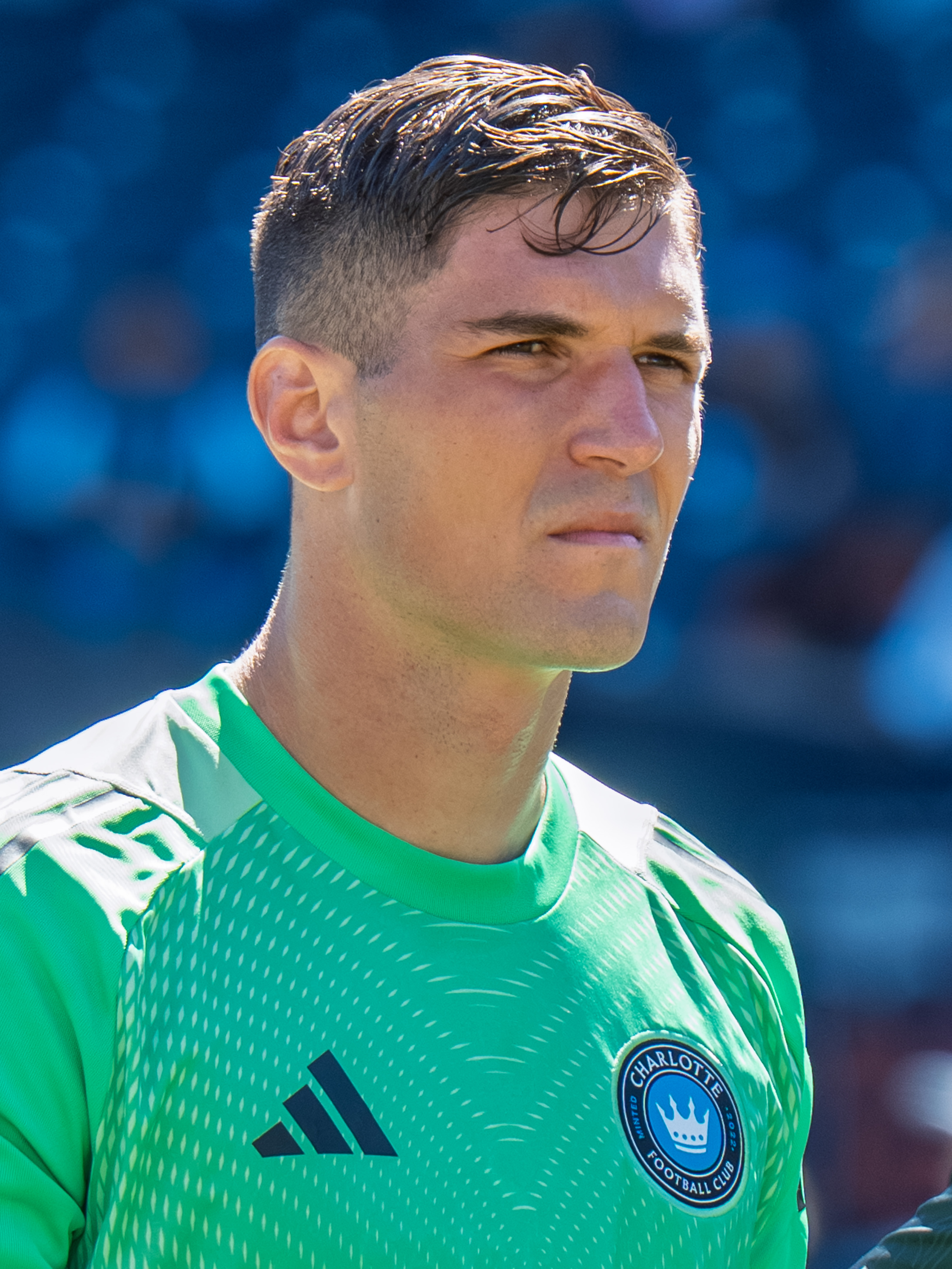
- Kahlina with Charlotte FC in 2025

Personal information
- Full name: Kristijan Kahlina
- Date of birth: 24 July 1992 (age 34)
- Place of birth: Zagreb, Croatia
- Height: 1.88 m (6 ft 2 in)
- Position: Goalkeeper

Team information
- Current team: Charlotte FC
- Number: 1

Youth career
- 2003–2011: Dinamo Zagreb

Senior career*
Years	Team	Apps	(Gls)
2011	Dinamo Zagreb	0	(0)
2011–2013	Vinogradar	58	(0)
2013–2015	Lučko	31	(0)
2015–2016	Koper	11	(0)
2016–2021	Gorica	148	(0)
2021	→ Ludogorets (loan)	9	(0)
2021	Ludogorets	10	(0)
2022–	Charlotte FC	155	(0)
2023	Crown Legacy FC	1	(0)

International career
2011	Croatia U19	1	(0)
- * Club domestic league appearances and goals as of 19:38, 15 November 2026 (UTC)

Kristijan Kahlina (born 24 July 1992) is a Croatian professional footballer who plays as a goalkeeper for Charlotte FC in Major League Soccer.

== Club career ==
Kahlina played for NK Vinogradar in 2011–12 and 2012–13.

In 2019, he was named captain for HNK Gorica.

Kahlina signed with Major League Soccer expansion team Charlotte FC in December 2021, ahead of their inaugural season.

After playing every minute of the season for Charlotte FC in 2024 and finishing with 12 shutouts, Kahlina won the MLS Goalkeeper of the Year Award.

== International career ==
Kahlina played with the Croatia national under-19 team.

== Career statistics ==
As of match played 7 November 2025

Appearances and goals by club, season and competition
Club	Season	League			Cup		Europe		Other		Total	
Club	Season	Division	Apps	Goals	Apps	Goals	Apps	Goals	Apps	Goals	Apps	Goals
Vinogradar	2011–12	2. HNL	28	0	0	0	—		—		28	0
Vinogradar	2012–13	2. HNL	30	0	0	0	—		—		30	0
Vinogradar	Total		58	0	0	0	—		—		58	0
Lučko	2013–14	2. HNL	12	0	0	0	—		—		12	0
Lučko	2014–15	2. HNL	19	0	—		—		—		19	0
Lučko	Total		31	0	0	0	—		—		31	0
Koper	2015–16	Slovenian PrvaLiga	11	0	3	0	0	0	0	0	14	0
Gorica	2016–17	2. HNL	29	0	2	0	—		2	0	33	0
Gorica	2017–18	2. HNL	33	0	3	0	—		—		36	0
Gorica	2018–19	1. HNL	36	0	0	0	—		—		36	0
Gorica	2019–10	1. HNL	36	0	1	0	—		—		37	0
Gorica	2020–21	1. HNL	14	0	2	0	—		—		16	0
Gorica	Total		148	0	8	0	—		2	0	158	0
Ludogorets (loan)	2020–21	First League	9	0	3	0	—		—		12	0
Ludogorets (loan)	2021–22	First League	10	0	1	0	12	0	1	0	24	0
Ludogorets (loan)	Total		19	0	4	0	12	0	1	0	36	0
Charlotte FC	2022	MLS	31	0	1	0	—		—		32	0
Charlotte FC	2023	MLS	24	0	3	0	—		6	0	33	0
Charlotte FC	2024	MLS	34	0	0	0	—		5	0	39	0
Charlotte FC	2025	MLS	32	0	0	0	—		4	0	36	0
Charlotte FC	Total		121	0	4	0	—		15	0	140	0
Career total			388	0	19	0	12	0	18	0	437	0

== Honours ==
Ludogorets Razgrad

- Bulgarian First League: 2020–21
- Bulgarian Supercup: 2021

Individual

- MLS Goalkeeper of the Year Award: 2024
- MLS Best XI: 2024
