= Enzo Copetti =

Argentine footballer (born 1996)

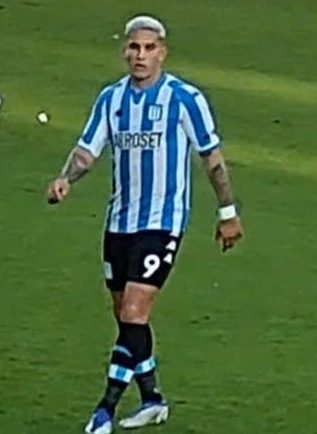
- Copetti with Racing Club in 2022

Personal information
- Full name: Enzo Nahuel Copetti
- Date of birth: 16 January 1996 (age 30)
- Place of birth: Roque Sáenz Peña, Argentina
- Height: 1.80 m (5 ft 11 in)
- Positions: Winger; second striker

Team information
- Current team: Rosario Central
- Number: 22

Youth career
- Rafaela

Senior career*
Years	Team	Apps	(Gls)
2016–2021	Rafaela	52	(5)
2021	→ Racing (loan)	38	(7)
2022	Racing	40	(19)
2023–2024	Charlotte FC	35	(7)
2024–	Rosario Central	71	(9)
- * Club domestic league appearances and goals as of 17:11, 10 July 2026 (UTC)

Enzo Nahuel Copetti (born 16 January 1996) is an Argentine professional footballer who plays as a winger or second striker for Rosario Central.

== Career ==
Copetti joined Atlético de Rafaela's academy during 2012–13. He made the step into senior football in 2016, as he made his debut on 2 June in a Copa Argentina match against Ferro Carril Oeste. In April 2017, Copetti made his first appearance in the Primera División off the bench against Huracán. Two further appearances - as a starter - followed in Rafaela's relegation season of 2016–17. He scored his first senior goal in a cup victory over Defensores de Belgrano on 24 July 2018. Copetti left the club after the 2020 campaign, which he ended with five goals in nine games; he notably scored twice over Tigre on 7 December 2020.

On 16 February 2021, Copetti was loaned to Primera División side Racing Club; penning terms until the succeeding December, including a purchase option. He scored on his debut against Aldosivi four days later, prior to netting again in his fourth overall appearance for them on 8 March versus Rosario Central. At the end of the year, Racing made use of the purchase option, with Copetti signing a permanently deal until the end of 2024.

Obviamente, vamos a esperar a ver qué pase con los otros partidos. Sabemos que estamos ahí arriba, estamos todos juntos; que la gente se quede tranquila, nosotros vamos a luchar hasta el final. [...] Sí, vamos a salir campeones.

Translation:

Obviously, we are going to wait and see what happens with the other matches. We know we are up there, we are all together; that people remain calm, we are going to fight until the end. [...] Yes, we are going to be champions.

— Copetti via press conference ,

On 6 November 2022, Copetti became champion of Trofeo de Campeones de la Liga Profesional after beating Boca 2–1. He was the striker with most goals from Racing in all 2022.

On 11 January 2023, Copetti signed 3-year deal with Major League Soccer side Charlotte FC.

Copetti signed with Argentine Primera División side Rosario Central on 16 May 2024.

== Style of play ==
Copetti is primarily a winger or second striker, though is capable of playing as a centre-forward and midfielder.

== Career statistics ==
As of match played on 5 May 2024

Appearances and goals by club, season and competition
Club	Season	League			National cup		Continental		Other		Total	
Club	Season	Division	Apps	Goals	Apps	Goals	Apps	Goals	Apps	Goals	Apps	Goals
Atlético de Rafaela	2016–17	Argentine Primera División	3	0	1	0	—		—		4	0
Atlético de Rafaela	2017–18	Primera B Nacional	9	0	1	0	—		—		10	0
Atlético de Rafaela	2018–19	Primera B Nacional	21	0	3	1	—		—		24	1
Atlético de Rafaela	2019–20	Primera Nacional	19	6	1	0	—		—		20	6
Atlético de Rafaela	Totals		52	6	6	1	—		—		58	7
Racing (loan)	2021	Argentine Primera División	38	7	3	3	7 (Note: Appearance(s) in the Copa Libertadores)	1	1 (Note: Appearance(s) in the Supercopa Argentina)	0	49	11
Racing	2022	Argentine Primera División	40	19	2	1	4 (Note: Appearance(s) in the Copa Sudamericana)	1	1 (Note: Appearance(s) in the Trofeo de Campeones)	0	47	21
Charlotte FC	2023	Major League Soccer	26	6	2	1	—		1 (Note: Appearance in the MLS Cup Playoffs)	0	29	7
Charlotte FC	2024	Major League Soccer	9	1	—		—		—		9	1
Charlotte FC	Totals		35	7	2	1	—		1	0	38	8
Career totals			165	39	13	6	11	2	3	0	192	47

== Honours ==
Racing Club

- Trofeo de Campeones: 2022

Rosario Central

- Primera División: 2025 Liga
- Supercopa Internacional: 2026
