= Kerwin Vargas =

Colombian footballer (born 2002)

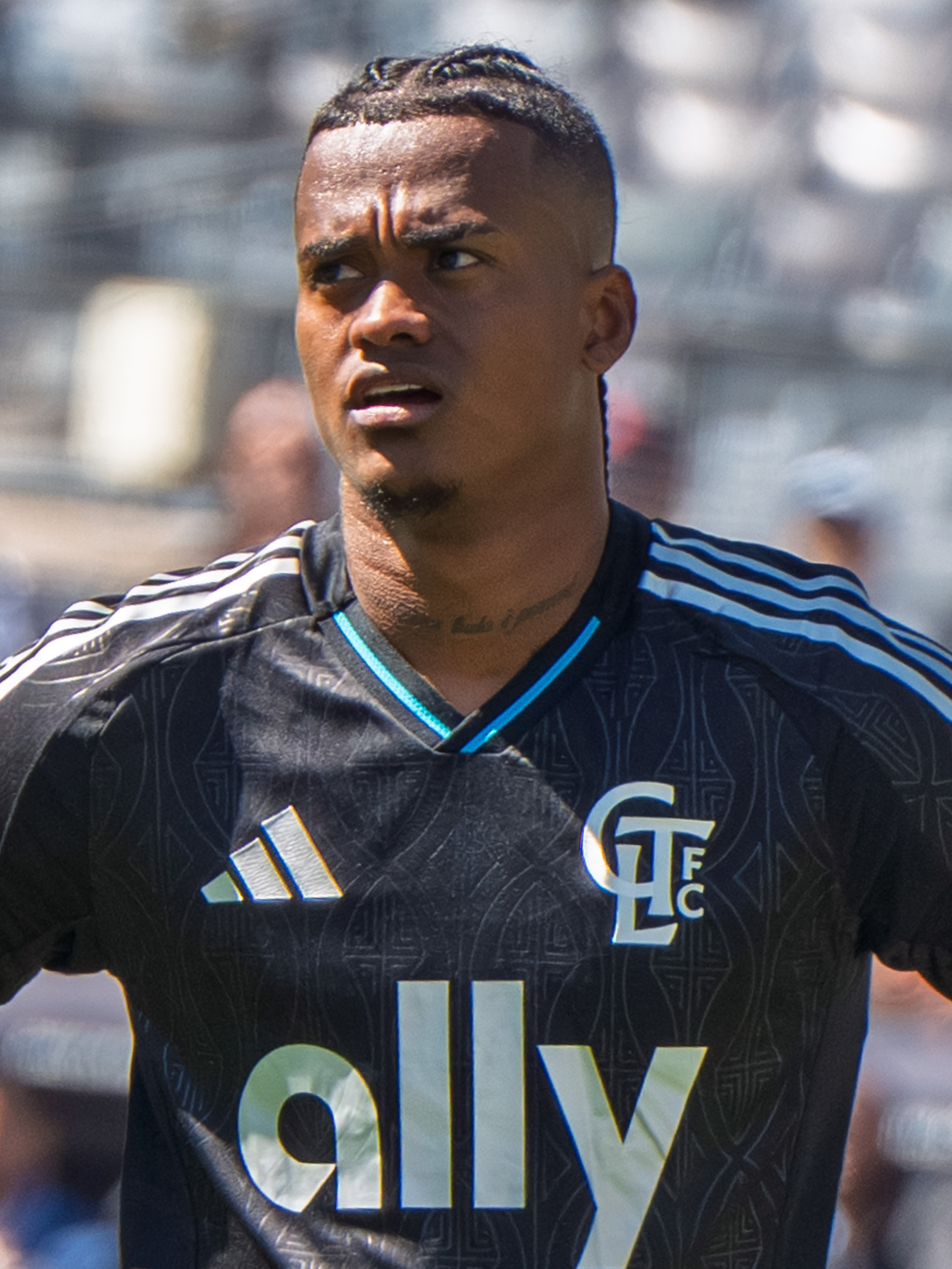
- Vargas with Charlotte FC in 2025

Personal information
- Full name: Kerwin Andrés Calderón Vargas
- Date of birth: 2 January 2002 (age 24)
- Place of birth: Concordia, Magdalena, Colombia
- Height: 1.80 m (5 ft 11 in)
- Position: Forward

Team information
- Current team: Athletico Paranaense
- Number: 18

Youth career
- Cundy FC
- 2011–2016: CA Santa Marta
- 2017: Boca Juniors de Cali
- 2018–2020: Academia Europea
- 2020–2021: Feirense

Senior career*
Years	Team	Apps	(Gls)
2021–2022	Feirense	28	(7)
2022–2026	Charlotte FC	126	(19)
2026–	Athletico Paranaense	9	(2)
- * Club domestic league appearances and goals as of 16:38, 10 November 2026 (UTC)

Kerwin Andrés Calderón Vargas (born 2 January 2002) is a Colombian professional footballer who plays as a forward for Brazilian club Athletico Paranaense.

== Club career ==
Born in a small village in Concordia, Magdalena, Colombia, Vargas started his career with Cundy FC, before moving to CA Santa Marta at the age of nine. He left for a short spell with Boca Juniors de Cali at the age of 15, but returned to CA Santa Marta, who were later renamed Academia Europea.

After traveling with numerous top teams across Europe, he moved to Portugal in 2020, and signed for Feirense. After two years, he joined Charlotte FC for its inaugural season.

== Career statistics ==
As of 10 November 2026

Club statistics
Club	Season	League			National Cup (Note: Includes Taça de Portugal, U.S. Open Cup and Copa do Brasil)		League Cup (Note: Includes Taça da Liga and Leagues Cup)		Other		Total	
Club	Season	Division	Apps	Goals	Apps	Goals	Apps	Goals	Apps	Goals	Apps	Goals
Feirense	2021–22	Liga Portugal 2	28	7	2	1	1	0	—		31	8
Charlotte FC	2022	Major League Soccer	13	0	1	0	—		—		14	0
Charlotte FC	2023	Major League Soccer	29	4	1	0	5	0	1 (Note: Appearance(s) in MLS Cup playoffs)	1	36	5
Charlotte FC	2024	Major League Soccer	33	6	0	0	2	0	3	0	38	6
Charlotte FC	2025	Major League Soccer	34	6	2	1	2	1	3	0	41	8
Charlotte FC	2026	Major League Soccer	17	3	2	1	0	0	—		19	4
Charlotte FC	Total		126	19	6	2	9	1	7	1	148	23
Athletico Paranaense	2026	Série A	9	2	2	0	—		—		11	2
Career totals			163	28	10	3	10	1	7	1	190	33
