= Brandon Cambridge =

Canadian soccer player (born 2002)

Personal information
- Full name: Akeil Omari Brandon Cambridge
- Date of birth: February 9, 2002 (age 24)
- Place of birth: Brooklyn, New York, United States
- Height: 6 ft 0 in (1.83 m)
- Position: Midfielder

Team information
- Current team: Orange County SC
- Number: 14

Youth career
- Fraser Valley Premier
- 2018–2020: Vancouver Whitecaps

College career
Years	Team	Apps	(Gls)
2020–2022	Portland Pilots	45	(17)

Senior career*
Years	Team	Apps	(Gls)
2021–2022	PDX FC	9	(1)
2023–2025	Charlotte FC	14	(2)
2023–2025	→ Crown Legacy (loan)	19	(6)
2026	Čukarički	0	(0)
2026	Sacramento Republic	5	(0)
2026–	Orange County SC	11	(0)
- * Club domestic league appearances and goals as of 13:56, 10 November 2026 (UTC)

Akeil Omari Brandon Cambridge (born February 9, 2002) is an American professional soccer player who plays for USL Championship club Orange County SC.

== Early life ==
Cambridge was born in Brooklyn, New York, to South African parents but moved to Cape Town, South Africa with his family when he was one month old. When he was nine, he moved to Florida, before moving to Meadow Lake, Saskatchewan in Canada at age ten, and then Chilliwack, British Columbia at age eleven. He played youth soccer with Fraser Valley Premier, before joining the Vancouver Whitecaps Academy in January 2018. He had previously trained with Abbotsford United in 2017. He played with the British Columbia Provincial Team from 2014 until 2017.

== College career ==
In 2020, Cambridge began attending the University of Portland, where he played for the men's soccer team. He made his debut on February 3, 2021, scoring two goals and adding an assist, after coming on as a substitute against the George Fox Bruins. He made his first start in the next match on February 8 against the Oregon State Beavers. After his freshman season, he was named to the All-WCC Freshman Team. He scored the game-winning goal via a penalty kick in a 1–0 win over the Sacramento State Hornets on September 13, 2021. He was named the U.S. Bank Student-Athletes of the Month for September 2022. He was a three-time WCC Player of the Week in the 2022 season. He was also named the TopDrawerSoccer Player of the Week and named to the College Soccer News Team of the Week in September 2022. On November 5, 2022, he scored a hat trick in a 4–0 victory over the Santa Clara Broncos, which earned him College Soccer News Player of the Week honors. He led the WCC in goals, points, and game-winning goals in 2022. At the end of his junior season in 2022, he was named the WCC Offensive Player of the Year, named to the All-WCC First Team and a Third Team All-American. He departed Portland after his junior season to turn professional.

== Club career ==
In 2021 and 2022, Cambridge played with PDX FC in USL League Two.

In December 2022, Major League Soccer club Charlotte FC acquired Cambridge's homegrown rights from Vancouver Whitecaps FC in exchange for $50,000 in General Allocation Money, other conditional GAM, as well as a sell-on fee. Charlotte then signed him to a homegrown player contract. On March 26, 2023, he made his professional debut playing for Charlotte's second team, Crown Legacy FC, in MLS Next Pro, scoring the team's first ever goal against Huntsville City FC. He scored a brace in Crown Legacy's next match on March 31, in a 2–1 victory over FC Cincinnati 2, earning MLSNP Player of the Matchday honors. He made his Major League Soccer debut on April 8 against Real Salt Lake. On May 17, Cambridge scored his first two MLS goals in a 2–1 victory over the Chicago Fire.

In January 2026, he signed with Serbian SuperLiga club Čukarički.

In March 2026, he signed a 25-day contract with USL Championship club Sacramento Republic FC.

In April 2026, he signed with USL Championship club Orange County SC.

== International career ==
In February 2016, he made his debut in the Canadian national program, attending a Canada U15 identification camp, and also attended a second camp in March 2017.

In June 2023, Cambridge was named to Canada's preliminary squad for the 2023 CONCACAF Gold Cup.

== Career statistics ==
As of match played April 22, 2026

Club	Season	League			Playoffs		National Cup		Continental		Other		Total	
Club	Season	Division	Apps	Goals	Apps	Goals	Apps	Goals	Apps	Goals	Apps	Goals	Apps	Goals
PDX FC	2021	USL League Two	4	1	—		—		—		—		4	1
PDX FC	2022	USL League Two	5	0	—		—		—		—		5	0
PDX FC	Total		9	1	0	0	0	0	0	0	0	0	9	1
Charlotte FC	2023	Major League Soccer	9	2	0	0	2	0	—		2	0	13	2
Charlotte FC	2024	Major League Soccer	4	0	0	0	—		—		1	0	5	0
Charlotte FC	2025	Major League Soccer	1	0	1	0	0	0	—		2	0	4	0
Charlotte FC	Total		14	2	1	0	2	0	0	0	5	0	22	2
Crown Legacy FC (loan)	2023	MLS Next Pro	9	4	1	0	—		—		—		10	4
Crown Legacy FC (loan)	2024	MLS Next Pro	8	2	2	0	0	0	—		—		10	2
Crown Legacy FC (loan)	2025	MLS Next Pro	2	0	—		—		—		—		2	0
Crown Legacy FC (loan)	Total		19	6	3	0	0	0	0	0	0	0	22	6
Sacramento Republic FC	2026	USL Championship	3	0	—		2		—		—		5	0
Sacramento Republic FC	Total		5	0	0	0	2	0	0	0	0	0	5	0
Orange County SC	2026	USL Championship	—	—	—		—		—		—		—	—
Orange County SC	Total		0	0	0	0	0	0	0	0	0	0	0	0
Career total			47	9	4	0	4	0	0	0	5	0	58	9
