= Christian Lattanzio =

Italian football manager (born 1971)

Personal information
- Full name: Christian Lattanzio
- Date of birth: September 10, 1971 (age 55)
- Place of birth: Rome, Italy

Managerial career
- Years: Team
- 2022–2023: Charlotte FC
- 2024: Sint-Truiden
- 2024–2025: Shenzhen Peng City

Christian Lattanzio (born 10 September 1971) is an Italian football coach.

== Career ==
Christian Lattanzio was born on 10 September 1971. He started his managerial career as an assistant coach and technical coordinator for Manchester City's youth teams, before working with Patrick Vieira at New York City FC and Nice, and then serving as an assistant coach for Fabio Capello, Gianfranco Zola and Roberto Mancini.

On 12 July 2021, Lattanzio was appointed as an assistant coach of MLS expansion team Charlotte FC, being set to work under head coach Miguel Ángel Ramírez.

On 31 May 2022, Lattanzio became the interim coach of Charlotte FC, following the firing of Ramírez. Throughout the rest of the 2022 season, Lattanzio guided the team to an 8-10-2 record, keeping the team in contention for the play-offs until the final week. On 26 October the club announced that Lattanzio had signed a contract extension to become the club's permanent head coach through 2024, with an option for the 2025 season. On 14 November 2023, Charlotte FC announced that they would part ways with Lattanzio and assistant coach Andy Quy.

On 14 June 2024, Lattanzio was announced as the new head coach of Belgian club Sint-Truiden.

== Managerial statistics ==
As of 6 July 2025

Managerial record by team and tenure
Team	Nat	From	To	Record								Ref
Team	Nat	From	To	G	W	D	L	GF	GA	GD	Win %	Ref
Charlotte FC	(United States)	31 May 2022	8 November 2023	63	22	17	24	91	101	−10	34.92	
Sint-Truiden	(Belgium)	14 June 2024	3 September 2024	6	0	3	3	6	15	−9	0.00	
Shenzhen Peng City	(China)	4 October 2024	6 July 2025	17	4	2	11	23	42	−19	23.53	
Career total				86	26	22	38	120	158	−38	30.23	—
