= List of Charlotte FC players =

Charlotte FC is an American soccer club founded in 2019, after the city of Charlotte was awarded a Major League Soccer (MLS) franchise. Charlotte FC began playing competitive soccer in the 2022 season. It plays its home games at Bank of America Stadium, competing in the Eastern Conference of MLS.

== Players ==
All statistics are for MLS regular season games only and are correct through the 2023 season.

Key

DF = Defender

MF = Midfielder

FW = Forward/striker

=== Outfield players ===
Name	Position	Country	Years	Games	Goals	Assists	Notes
Harrison Afful	DF	Ghana	2022–2023	36	0	2	
Patrick Agyemang	FW	USA	2023–2025	59	17	6	
Jordy Alcívar	MF	Ecuador	2022	20	1	1	
Scott Arfield	MF	Canada	2023–	13	2	0	
Adam Armour	DF	USA	2022–	5	1	0	
Ben Bender	MF	USA	2022–	45	6	9	
Brandt Bronico	MF	USA	2022–	66	2	8	
Nathan Byrne	DF	England	2022–	36	0	1	
Brandon Cambridge	MF	USA	2023–	9	2	0	
Enzo Copetti	FW	Argentina	2023–	26	6	2	
Guzmán Corujo	DF	Uruguay	2022–2023	31	1	0	
Brecht Dejaegere	MF	Belgium	2023–	9	1	1	
Hamady Diop	DF	Senegal	2023–	3	0	0	
Alan Franco	MF	Ecuador	2022	10	0	1	
Christian Fuchs	DF	Austria	2022	26	3	1	
McKinze Gaines	FW	USA	2022–2023	42	2	5	
Chris Hegardt	MF	USA	2022–2023	7	0	0	
Derrick Jones	MF	USA	2022–2023	44	1	0	
Kamil Jóźwiak	MF	Poland	2022–2023	44	2	10	
Jaylin Lindsey	DF	USA	2022–	47	1	7	
Christian Makoun	DF	Venezuela	2022	13	0	0	
Adilson Malanda	DF	France	2022–	35	0	2	
Quinn McNeill	MF	USA	2022	11	1	2	
Vinicius Mello	FW	Brazil	2022–2023	3	0	0	
Justin Meram	MF	Iraq	2023	25	4	4	
Joseph Mora	DF	Costa Rica	2022–2023	27	0	0	
Christian Ortiz	FW	Argentina	2022	15	1	2	
Andrew Privett	MF	USA	2023–	12	0	0	
Yordy Reyna	FW	Peru	2022	19	3	3	
Daniel Ríos	FW	Mexico	2022	27	7	1	
Sergio Ruiz	MF	Spain	2022	18	1	3	
Koa Santos	DF	USA	2022	1	0	0	
Nuno Santos	MF	Portugal	2022–2023	9	1	1	
Andre Shinyashiki	FW	Brazil	2022–2023	26	6	1	
Jan Sobociński	DF	Poland	2022–2023	22	0	0	
Karol Świderski	FW	Poland	2022–	61	22	10	
Bill Tuiloma	DF	New Zealand	2023–	17	0	1	
Jere Uronen	DF	Finland	2023–	9	0	0	
Kerwin Vargas	FW	Colombia	2022–	42	4	6	
Anton Walkes	DF	England	2022	23	0	0	
Ashley Westwood	MF	England	2023–	29	3	4	

=== Goalkeepers ===
Name	Country	Years	Games	Conceded	Shutouts	Notes
Kristijan Kahlina	Croatia	2022–	55	81	13	
George Marks	USA	2022–	8	14	1	
Pablo Sisniega	Mexico	2022–2023	5	9	1	

== By nationality ==
MLS regulations permit teams to name eight players from outside of the United States in their rosters. However, this limit can be exceeded by trading international slots with another MLS team, or if one or more of the overseas players is a refugee or has permanent residency rights in the USA.

Country	Number of players	Games
Argentina	2	41
Austria	1	26
Belgium	1	9
Brazil	2	29
Canada	1	13
Colombia	1	42
Costa Rica	1	27
Croatia	1	55
Ecuador	2	30
England	3	88
Finland	1	9
France	1	35
Ghana	1	36
Iraq	1	25
Mexico	2	32
New Zealand	1	17
Peru	1	19
Poland	3	127
Portugal	1	9
Spain	1	18
Uruguay	1	31
USA	10	322
Venezuela	1	13
