= 2022 MLS expansion draft =

Player draft for MLS teams

2022 MLS Expansion Draft

General information
- Date: November 11, 2022

Overview
- 5 total selections in 5 rounds
- Expansion teams: St. Louis City SC
- Expansion season: 2023

The 2022 MLS Expansion Draft was a special draft for the Major League Soccer expansion team St. Louis City SC that was held on November 11, 2022. The list of exposed players was revealed on November 10, 2022. The picks were made on November 11, 2022, at 6:30 PM ET with St. Louis City SC selecting Nicholas Gioacchini, Indiana Vassilev, Jonathan Bell, John Nelson, and Jake LaCava.

== Format ==
Teams who had players selected in the 2021 MLS Expansion Draft were exempt. These teams were Austin FC, Atlanta United FC, D.C. United, Los Angeles FC, and New York City FC. All other teams from the 2022 season were subject to the draft. These teams had 12 protection slots that they may apply to any draft eligible player on their senior, and supplemental rosters. Players who have not graduated from Generation Adidas, and homegrown players age 25 and under as of the end of the 2022 season were not eligible for the draft. Players with contracts expiring at the end of the season, designated players, and players with no-trade clauses were part of a team's roster and were eligible for the draft. In the case of players with no-trade clauses, a team must use one of their protection slots for that player. A team that had a player selected in the draft became exempt from any further picks in the draft. The expansion team, St. Louis City SC was given 5 picks for the draft.

== Expansion Draft picks ==
| Pick | MLS team | Player | Previous team | Notes |
|---|---|---|---|---|
| 1 | St. Louis City SC | Nicholas Gioacchini | Orlando City SC | |
| 2 | St. Louis City SC | Indiana Vassilev | Inter Miami CF | |
| 3 | St. Louis City SC | Jonathan Bell | New England Revolution | |
| 4 | St. Louis City SC | John Nelson | FC Cincinnati | |
| 5 | St. Louis City SC | Jake LaCava | New York Red Bulls | Traded to Inter Miami CF in exchange for $150,000 of General Allocation Money. |

== Team-by-team-breakdown ==
=== Charlotte FC ===
Exposed
Harrison Afful
Jordy Alcívar
Adam Armour
Guzmán Corujo
Alan Franco
Christian Fuchs
George Marks
Quinn McNeill
Joseph Mora
Yordy Reyna
Koa Santos
Andre Shinyashiki
Pablo Sisniega
Jan Sobocinski
Adrian Zendejas

=== Chicago Fire FC ===
Exposed
Jonathan Bornstein
Kendall Burks
Fabian Herbers
Stanislav Ivanov
Spencer Richey
Boris Sekulić

=== FC Cincinnati ===
Exposed
Dominique Badji
Tyler Blackett
Geoff Cameron
Allan Cruz
Raymon Gaddis
Yuya Kubo
Evan Louro
Nicholas Markanich
Ronald Matarrita
Júnior Moreno
John Nelson
Alvas Powell

=== Colorado Rapids ===
Exposed
Steven Beitashour
Lucas Esteves
Felipe Gutiérrez
Clint Irwin
Anthony Markanich
Philip Mayaka
Drew Moor
Collen Warner
Danny Wilson
Gyasi Zardes

=== Columbus Crew ===
Exposed
Jalil Anibaba
Evan Bush
Derrick Etienne Jr.
Marlon Hairston
Erik Hurtado
James Igbekeme
Kevin Molino
Pedro Santos
Brady Scott
Yaw Yeboah

=== FC Dallas ===
Exposed
Lucas Bartlett
Dominick Hernandez
Franco Jara
Nanu
Facundo Quignon
Joshué Quiñónez

=== Houston Dynamo FC ===
Exposed
Beto Avila
Mateo Bajamich
Darwin Cerén
Joe Corona
Sam Junqua
Nico Lemoine
Michael Nelson
Tim Parker
Darwin Quintero
Memo Rodriguez
Thiaguinho
Zarek Valentin
Zeca

=== Inter Miami CF ===
Exposed
George Acosta
Corentin Jean
CJ Dos Santos
Kieran Gibbs
Gonzalo Higuaín
Joevin Jones
Aimé Mabika
Nick Marsman
Harvey Neville
Alejandro Pozuelo
Brek Shea
Victor Ulloa
Indiana Vassilev

=== Sporting Kansas City ===
Exposed
Roger Espinoza
Andreu Fontàs
Nicolas Isimat-Mirin
Kendall McIntosh
Tim Melia
Oriol Rosell
Khiry Shelton
Ben Sweat

=== Los Angeles Galaxy ===
Exposed
Daniel Aguirre
Martin Cáceres
Douglas Costa
Nick DePuy
Chase Gasper
Carlos Harvey
Jonathan Klinsmann
Sacha Kljestan
Kelvin Leerdam
Farai Mutatu
Richard Sánchez
Victor Vásquez
Jorge Villafaña
Eriq Zavaleta

=== Minnesota United FC ===
Exposed
Alan Benítez
Abu Danladi
Bakaye Dibassy
Eric Dick
Oniel Fisher
Jonathan González
Niko Hansen
Jacori Hayes
Brent Kallman
Nabilai Kibunguchy
Justin McMaster
Romain Métanire
Tyler Miller
Callum Montgomery
Tanitolua Oluwaseyi
Joseph Rosales
Wil Trapp

=== CF Montréal ===
Exposed
Zorhan Bassong
Sebastian Breza
Rudy Camacho
Gabriele Corbo
Ahmed Hamdi
Sunusi Ibrahim
Bjørn Johnsen
Logan Ketterer
Jojea Kwizera
Chinonso Offor
Róbert Thorkelsson
Victor Wanyama

=== Nashville SC ===
Exposed
Brian Anunga
Josh Bauer
Teal Bunbury
Roberto Castellanos
Irakoze Donasiyano
Luke Haakenson
Aké Arnaud Loba
Ahmed Longmire
Dax McCarty
Bryan Meredith
Will Meyer
Eric Miller
Alex Muyl
Elliot Panicco
Rodrigo Piñeiro
Taylor Washington

=== New England Revolution ===
Exposed
Jon Bell
Emmanuel Boateng
Gustavo Bou
A. J. DeLaGarza
Clément Diop
Earl Edwards Jr.
Omar Gonzalez
Jacob Jackson
Wilfrid Kaptoum
Edward Kizza
Brad Knighton
Lucas Maciel
Christian Makoun
Ben Reveno
Ryan Spaulding
Ismael Tajouri-Shradi

=== New York Red Bulls ===
Exposed
Jesús Castellano
Caden Clark
Kyle Duncan
Patryk Klimala
Jake LaCava
Aaron Long
Anthony Marccucci
Ryan Meara
Hassan Ndam
Dylan Nealis
Matthew Nocita
Steven Sserwadda

=== Orlando City SC ===
Exposed
Tesho Akindele
Wilder Cartagena
Joey DeZart
Nicholas Gioacchini
Adam Grinwis
Jack Lynn
João Moutinho
Jake Mulraney
Alexandre Pato
Kyle Smith
Júnior Urso

=== Philadelphia Union ===
Exposed
Abasa Aremeyaw
Alejandro Bedoya
Joe Bendik
Jesús Bueno
Chris Donovan
Gino Portella

=== Portland Timbers ===
Exposed
David Bingham
Sebastian Blanco
Pablo Bonilla
George Fochive
Nathan Fogaça
Diego Gutierrez
Marvin Loría
Larrys Mabiala
Zac McGraw
Felipe Mora
Justin Rasmussen
Josecarlos Van Rankin
Justin vom Steeg

=== Real Salt Lake ===
Exposed
Nick Besler
Scott Caldwell
Maikel Chang
Tomás Gómez
Bret Halsey
Erik Holt
Johan Kappelhof
Jonathan Menéndez
Rubio Rubín
Marcelo Silva
Bobby Wood

=== San Jose Earthquakes ===
Exposed
Oskar Ågren
George Asomani
Matt Bersano
Jan Gregus
Siad Haji
Eric Remedi
Shea Salinas
Jack Skahan
Tommy Thompson

=== Seattle Sounders FC ===
Exposed
Samuel Adeniran
Will Bruin
Abdoulaye Cissoko
Stefan Cleveland
Jimmy Medranda
Fredy Montero
Jackson Ragen
Kelyn Rowe
Andrew Thomas

=== Toronto FC ===
Exposed
Ifunanyachi Achara
Auro Jr.
Alex Bono
Kadin Chung
Doneil Henry
Greg Ranjitsingh
Quentin Westberg

=== Vancouver Whitecaps FC ===
Exposed
Janio Bikel
Derek Cornelius
Cody Cropper
Cristian Dájome
David Egbo
Marcus Godinho
Cristián Gutiérrez
Florian Jungwirth
Luis Martins
Jake Nerwinski
Evan Newton
Leonard Owusu
Ryan Raposo
Tosaint Ricketts
Russell Teibert
