= 2024 Charlotte FC season =

Charlotte FC 2024 soccer season

Charlotte FC
2024 season
- Sporting director: Zoran Krneta
- Head coach: Dean Smith
- Stadium: Bank of America Stadium
- Major League Soccer: Conference: 5th Overall: 10th
- MLS Cup Playoffs: Round One
- Leagues Cup: Group stage
- Average home league attendance: 35,141
Home colors	Away colors

The 2024 season was the third season for Charlotte FC in Major League Soccer (MLS), the top flight of professional club soccer in the United States. The team is based in Charlotte, North Carolina, and was established in 2019. They made their MLS debut in the 2022 season. The 2024 season was their first for Charlotte FC under English head coach Dean Smith, who was hired in December 2023 and was the team's third manager.

== Summary ==
During the offseason, Charlotte FC were unable to retain Karol Swiderski, their leading goalscorer, along with striker Kamil Jozwiak and defender Guzmán Corujo. The team signed two midfielders and promoted two attacking players from their reserve team, Crown Legacy FC. Charlotte FC began their preseason in January at the Florida International University campus in Miami, where they trained for twelve days. The team then traveled to Indio, California, to play in the Coachella Valley Invitational, a friendly competition with other MLS teams. During five official preseason matches, Charlotte FC had two wins and three draws.

The team hosted New York City FC at Bank of America Stadium to open the regular season on February 24 in front of 62,291 spectators. Charlotte FC won 1–0 with a goal in the eighth minute from defender Adilson Malanda's header on a corner kick; it marked the first time that Charlotte FC had won their opening match of the season. Sixteen-year-old forward Nimfasha Berchimas, a homegrown player for Charlotte FC, entered the match as a substitute and became the ninth-youngest player to play in a regular season MLS match.

== Preseason results ==
Key

Win Draw Loss Void Upcoming fixture

January 26	Charlotte FC	3–3	Sporting Kansas City	University Park, Florida
11:00 am EST	Arfield 2', 12'; Agyemang 63'	Report	Thommy 44'; Hernández 86' (pen.); Cruz 90'	Stadium: FIU Soccer Stadium

February 3	Los Angeles FC	2–2	Charlotte FC	Los Angeles, California
2:00 pm EST	Goalscorers not reported	Report	Bronico; Romero	Stadium: LAFC Performance Center; Attendance: 0 (closed doors)
Note: Scrimmage divided into four periods of 30 minutes each.

February 7	LA Galaxy	0–3	Charlotte FC	Indio, California
2:00 pm EST		Report	Copetti 57'; Unnamed trialist 61'; Diop 81'	Stadium: Empire Polo Club

February 10	Charlotte FC	1–0	San Jose Earthquakes	Indio, California
2:00 pm EST	Westwood 37'	Report		Stadium: Empire Polo Club

February 17	Minnesota United FC	0–0	Charlotte FC	Indio, California
1:00 pm EST		Report		Stadium: Empire Polo Club

== Competitions ==
Charlotte FC will not participate in the 2024 U.S. Open Cup as part of a compromise agreement reached between MLS and U.S. Soccer to allow MLS Next Pro affiliate teams to instead play in the competition. Crown Legacy FC will enter in the first round of the U.S. Open Cup, while eight other MLS teams will enter in the round of 32.

=== Major League Soccer ===
==== League tables ====
MLS Eastern Conference table (2024)
Pos	Team	Pld	W	L	T	GF	GA	GD	Pts	Qualification
3	FC Cincinnati	34	18	11	5	58	48	+10	59	Qualification for round one and the 2025 Leagues Cup
4	Orlando City SC	34	15	12	7	59	50	+9	52	Qualification for round one and the 2025 Leagues Cup
5	Charlotte FC	34	14	11	9	46	37	+9	51	Qualification for round one and the 2025 Leagues Cup
6	New York City FC	34	14	12	8	54	49	+5	50	Qualification for round one and the 2025 Leagues Cup
7	New York Red Bulls	34	11	9	14	55	50	+5	47	Qualification for round one and the 2025 Leagues Cup

Source: MLS
Rules for classification: 1) points; 2) total wins; 3) total goal differential; 4) total goals scored; 5) fewer disciplinary points; 6) away goal differential; 7) away goals scored; 8) home goals differential; 9) home goals scored; 10) coin toss (2 clubs tied) or drawing of lots (≥3 clubs tied)

Overall MLS standings table
Pos	Team	Pld	W	L	T	GF	GA	GD	Pts	Qualification
9	Orlando City SC	34	15	12	7	59	50	+9	52	Qualification for the U.S. Open Cup Round of 32 (Note: As one of the best U.S. teams in the overall table to not qualify for the 2025 CONCACAF Champions Cup)
10	Minnesota United FC	34	15	12	7	58	49	+9	52	Qualification for the U.S. Open Cup Round of 32
11	Charlotte FC	34	14	11	9	46	37	+9	51	Qualification for the U.S. Open Cup Round of 32
12	Colorado Rapids	34	15	14	5	61	60	+1	50	Qualification for the CONCACAF Champions Cup Round One (Note: As third place of Leagues Cup)
13	New York City FC	34	14	12	8	54	49	+5	50	Qualification for the U.S. Open Cup Round of 32

Source: MLS
Rules for classification: 1) points; 2) total wins; 3) total goal differential; 4) total goals scored; 5) fewer disciplinary points; 6) away goal differential; 7) away goals scored; 8) home goals differential; 9) home goals scored; 10) coin toss (2 clubs tied) or drawing of lots (≥3 clubs tied)

==== Regular season ====
The 2024 regular season schedule was released on December 20, 2023. Charlotte FC will play 34 matches—17 at home and 17 on the road—primarily against opponents from the Eastern Conference. The team will play each intra-conference opponent twice and six matches against teams from the Western Conference. The 2024 season marks the first time that Charlotte FC will play against Minnesota United FC and the Portland Timbers. A break in regular season play for the 2024 Leagues Cup begins in mid-July and ends in late August.

February 24 1	Charlotte FC	1–0	New York City FC	Charlotte, North Carolina
7:30 pm EST	Malanda 8'; Westwood (yellow card) 34'; Uronen (yellow card) 73'	Report	Thiago (yellow card) 65'	Stadium: Bank of America Stadium; Attendance: 62,291; Referee: Mario Maric

March 2 2	Vancouver Whitecaps FC	1–1	Charlotte FC	Vancouver, British Columbia
7:30 pm EST	Raposo 45+5'; Cubas (yellow card) 57'; Blackmon (yellow card) 61'	Report	Tavares 25' (yellow card) 79'; Westwood (yellow card) 44'	Stadium: BC Place; Attendance: 29,624; Referee: Scott Bowman

March 9 3	Toronto FC	1–0	Charlotte FC	Toronto, Ontario
2:00 pm EST	Insigne (yellow card) 27', (goal) 80'; Rosted (yellow card) 64'	Report	Vargas (yellow card) 60'; Arfield (yellow card) 82'; Dejaegere (yellow card) 86'; Kahlina (yellow card) 90+5'	Stadium: BMO Field; Attendance: 26,345; Referee: Chris Grabas

March 16 4	Nashville SC	2–1	Charlotte FC	Nashville, Tennessee
8:30 pm EDT	Surridge 32'; Muyl 40'; Maher (yellow card) 55'	Report	Dejaegere 45+4'; Tavares (yellow card) 56'; Byrne (yellow card) 57'; Privett (yellow card) 81'	Stadium: Geodis Park; Attendance: 28,008; Referee: Esteban Rosano

March 23 5	Charlotte FC	2–0	Columbus Crew	Charlotte, North Carolina
7:30 pm EDT	Westwood (yellow card) 11', (goal) 83'; Tavares (yellow card) 69'; Agyemang (yellow card) 81', (goal) 88'; Pedro (yellow card) 85'; Petković (yellow card) 90+1'; Vargas (yellow card) 90+4'	Report	Jones (red card) 26'; Yeboah (yellow card) 45+15'; Rossi (yellow card) 45+15'; Bush (yellow card) 57'	Stadium: Bank of America Stadium; Attendance: 30,104; Referee: Christopher Calderon

March 30 6	Charlotte FC	1–1	FC Cincinnati	Charlotte, North Carolina
7:30 pm EDT	Diani 60'; Dejaegere (yellow card) 72'; Vargas (yellow card) 90+1'	Report	Murphy (yellow card) 65'; Boupendza (yellow card) 88', (goal) 90+2'; Celentano (yellow card) 90+1'; Nwobodo (yellow card) 90+7'	Stadium: Bank of America Stadium; Attendance: 30,043; Referee: Rubiel Vazquez

April 6 7	New England Revolution	1–0	Charlotte FC	Foxborough, Massachusetts
7:30 pm EDT	C. Gil (yellow card) 45+2', (goal) 45+3'; Polster (yellow card) 47'	Report	Arfield (yellow card) 75'; Copetti (yellow card) 90+6'	Stadium: Gillette Stadium; Attendance: 22,196; Referee: Sergii Boiko

April 13 8	Charlotte FC	3–2	Toronto FC	Charlotte, North Carolina
7:30 pm EDT	Vargas 39'; Abada 70', (yellow card) 74'; Agyemang 85'; Lindsey (yellow card) 87'	Report	Owusu 49', 78'; Coello (yellow card) 54'; Osorio (yellow card) 58'; Long (yellow card) 84' (yellow-red card) 90+8'	Stadium: Bank of America Stadium; Attendance: 31,414; Referee: Allen Chapman

April 21 9	Charlotte FC	0–3	Minnesota United FC	Charlotte, North Carolina
6:00 pm EDT	Petković (yellow card) 83'	Report	Oluwaseyi 31'; Lod 49'; Dotson 54'; Bran (yellow card) 90+3'	Stadium: Bank of America Stadium; Attendance: 27,021; Referee: Pierre-Luc Lauziere
Note: Originally scheduled for April 20 and moved to April 21.

April 27 10	New York City FC	2–1	Charlotte FC	New York City, New York
7:30 pm EDT	Parks 41'; Martínez 90+3'	Report	Vargas 3', (yellow card) 50'; Urso (yellow card) 21'; Westwood (yellow card) 53'	Stadium: Yankee Stadium; Attendance: 20,119; Referee: Ismir Pekmic

May 4 11	Charlotte FC	2–0	Portland Timbers	Charlotte, North Carolina
7:30 pm EDT	Tavares (yellow card) 45+3'; Dejaegere (yellow card) 45+3'; Petković 54'; Privett (yellow card) 82'; Bronico (yellow card) 82'; Copetti 90+1'; Diani (yellow card) 90+5'	Report	Paredes (yellow card) 20'; Williamson (yellow card) 36'	Stadium: Bank of America Stadium; Attendance: 27,495; Referee: Malik Badawi

May 11 12	Charlotte FC	1–0	Nashville SC	Charlotte, North Carolina
7:30 pm EDT	Agyemang 52'; Vargas (yellow card) 76'; Smalls (yellow card) 90+6'	Report	Boyd (yellow card) 22'; Lovitz (yellow card) 56'; Davis (yellow card) 88'	Stadium: Bank of America Stadium; Attendance: 36,319; Referee: Tori Penso

May 15 13	Chicago Fire FC	0–1	Charlotte FC	Chicago, Illinois
8:30 pm EDT	Terán (yellow card) 34'; Czichos (yellow card) 50'	Report	Westwood 60'; Agyemang (yellow card) 64'; Dejaegere (yellow card) 73'	Stadium: Soldier Field; Attendance: 12,806; Referee: Victor Rivas

May 18 14	Charlotte FC	0–0	LA Galaxy	Charlotte, North Carolina
7:30 pm EDT	Dejaegere (yellow card) 31'; Bronico (yellow card) 82'	Report	Aude (yellow card) 29'	Stadium: Bank of America Stadium; Attendance: 29,099; Referee: Joe Dickerson

May 25 15	Charlotte FC	0–0	Philadelphia Union	Charlotte, North Carolina
7:30 pm EDT		Report	McGlynn (yellow card) 25'; Harriel (yellow card) 65'	Stadium: Bank of America Stadium; Attendance: 32,232; Referee: Guido Gonzales, Jr.

May 29 16	New York Red Bulls	3–1	Charlotte FC	Harrison, New Jersey
7:30 pm EDT	Manoel (yellow card) 45+2'; Forsberg 74', 76'; Reyes 83'	Report	Privett (yellow card) 45+2'; Vargas (yellow card) 73'; Agyemang (yellow card) 80'; Westwood (yellow card) 86'; Bender 90+6'	Stadium: Red Bull Arena; Attendance: 16,516; Referee: Chris Penso

June 2 17	Atlanta United FC	2–3	Charlotte FC	Atlanta, Georgia
4:30 pm EDT	Almada 35', (yellow card) 36'; Lennon (yellow card) 51'; Silva 76'; Muyumba (yellow card) 90+3'	Report	Williams 40' (o.g); Urso (yellow card) 50'; Abada 56', 68'; Bronico (yellow card) 83'; Uronen (yellow card) 87'; Kahlina (yellow card) 89'	Stadium: Mercedes-Benz Stadium; Attendance: 61,209; Referee: Ismir Pekmic

June 15 18	Charlotte FC	1–0	D.C. United	Charlotte, North Carolina
7:30 pm EDT	Privett (yellow card) 45+6'; Vargas 45+7'; Kahlina (yellow card) 88'; Byrne (yellow card) 90+6'	Report	Benteke (yellow card) 72'; Dájome (yellow card) 75'	Stadium: Bank of America Stadium; Attendance: 30,468; Referee: Sergii Boiko

June 19 19	Charlotte FC	2–2	Orlando City SC	Charlotte, North Carolina
7:30 pm EDT	Vargas 12'; Arfield (red card) 38'; Bronico 77'; Byrne (yellow card) 90+1'	Report	McGuire (yellow card) 27', (goal) 63'; Torres (yellow card) 50', (goal) 81'	Stadium: Bank of America Stadium; Attendance: 28,301; Referee: Allen Chapman

June 22 20	Philadelphia Union	0–2	Charlotte FC	Chester, Pennsylvania
7:30 pm EDT		Report	Agyemang 56', 63'; Bender (yellow card) 68'; Diani (yellow card) 87'; Westwood (yellow card) 90+9'	Stadium: Subaru Park; Attendance: 18,762; Referee: Alexis Da Silva

June 29 21	Houston Dynamo FC	1–0	Charlotte FC	Houston, Texas
8:30 pm EDT	Aliyu 5'; Escobar (yellow card) 69'	Report	Diani (yellow card) 27'	Stadium: Shell Energy Stadium; Attendance: 15,321; Referee: Pierre-Luc Lauziere

July 3 22	Charlotte FC	1–2	Inter Miami CF	Charlotte, North Carolina
7:30 pm EDT	Agyemang 41', (yellow card) 45+2' (red card) 90+6'	Report	Kryvtsov (yellow card) 21'; Taylor 30'; Gómez (yellow card) 53'; Avilés (yellow card) 67'; Cremaschi 86'; Alba (yellow card) 90+3'	Stadium: Bank of America Stadium; Attendance: 47,218; Referee: Rubiel Vazquez

July 13 23	FC Cincinnati	1–3	Charlotte FC	Cincinnati, Ohio
7:30 pm EDT	Acosta 45+1', (yellow card) 87'; Robinson (yellow card) 59' (red card) 72'	Report	Diani (yellow card) 3'; Tavares 20'; Abada 22'; Westwood (yellow card) 45+4'; Malanda (yellow card) 47'; Byrne (yellow card) 54'; Vargas 66'; Smalls (yellow card) 90+8'	Stadium: TQL Stadium; Attendance: 25,513; Referee: Guido Gonzales, Jr.

July 17 24	Columbus Crew	1–1	Charlotte FC	Columbus, Ohio
7:30 pm EDT	Hernández 31'; Zawadzki (yellow card) 57'	Report	Agyemang 84'; Petković (yellow card) 89'; Byrne (yellow card) 90+4'	Stadium: Lower.com Field; Attendance: 20,793; Referee: Victor Rivas

July 20 25	Austin FC	2–2	Charlotte FC	Austin, Texas
8:30 pm EDT	Ring 11'; Rubio (yellow card) 75'; Gallagher 80'; Pereira (yellow card) 86'; Desler (yellow card) 87'	Report	Świderski 33' (pen.); Tavares 56'; Privett (yellow card) 59'	Stadium: Q2 Stadium; Attendance: 20,738; Referee: Jon Freemon

August 24 26	Charlotte FC	1–1	New York Red Bulls	Charlotte, North Carolina
7:30 pm EDT	Świderski 13' (pen.); Biel (yellow card) 69'; Urso (yellow card) 90+2'	Report	Manoel 37'	Stadium: Bank of America Stadium; Attendance: 31,320; Referee: Drew Fischer

August 31 27	Charlotte FC	0–1	Atlanta United FC	Charlotte, North Carolina
7:30 pm EDT		Report	Gregersen (yellow card) 42'; Fortune 76'	Stadium: Bank of America Stadium; Referee: Alexis Da Silva

September 14 28	CF Montréal	2–1	Charlotte FC	Montreal, Quebec
7:30 pm EDT	Clark 23'; Duke 26'	Report	Ream 35'	Stadium: Saputo Stadium; Attendance: 19,619; Referee: Rubiel Vazquez

September 18 29	Orlando City SC	2–0	Charlotte FC	Orlando, Florida
8:00 pm EDT	Ojeda (yellow card) 22'; Thórhallsson (yellow card) 42'; Torres 52'; Araújo (yellow card) 83'; McGuire 89'; Muriel (yellow card) 90+8'	Report	Bronico (yellow card) 36'	Stadium: Inter&Co Stadium; Attendance: 22,902; Referee: Marcos DeOliveira II

September 21 30	Charlotte FC	4–0	New England Revolution	Charlotte, North Carolina
7:30 pm EDT	Abada 39'; Byrne (yellow card) 51'; Biel 65'; Agyemang 77'; Malanda (yellow card) 82'; Vargas 87'	Report	C. Gil (yellow card) 32'; Parker (yellow card) 53'; Borrero (yellow card) 70' (yellow-red card) 70'	Stadium: Bank of America Stadium; Referee: Mark Allatin

September 28 31	Inter Miami CF	1–1	Charlotte FC	Fort Lauderdale, Florida
7:30 pm EDT	Gómez (yellow card) 4'; Messi 67'; Weigandt (yellow card) 71'; Bright (yellow card) 73'; Avilés (yellow card) 82'	Report	Świderski 57'; Malanda (yellow card) 74'	Stadium: Chase Stadium; Attendance: 21,374; Referee: Ramy Touchan

October 2 32	Charlotte FC	4–3	Chicago Fire FC	Charlotte, North Carolina
7:30 pm EDT	Świderski 8', 45+1', (yellow card) 69'; Abada (yellow card) 16', (goal) 58'; Urso 30'; Kahlina (yellow card) 90+3'	Report	Herbers 25'; Navarro (yellow card) 64'; Acosta 67'; Barlow 90+3'	Stadium: Bank of America Stadium; Attendance: 26,899; Referee: Sergii Boiko

October 5 33	Charlotte FC	2–0	CF Montréal	Charlotte, North Carolina
7:30 pm EDT	Świderski 34'; Tavares (yellow card) 80'; Vargas (yellow card) 83'; Agyemang 90+4'	Report	Edwards (yellow card) 10'; Saliba (yellow card) 73'; Álvarez (yellow card) 85'	Stadium: Bank of America Stadium; Attendance: 38,259; Referee: Victor Rivas

October 19 34	D.C. United	0–3	Charlotte FC	Washington, D.C.
7:30 pm EDT	Rodríguez (yellow card) 10'	Report	Biel 58'; Agyemang 75'; Kahlina (yellow card) 79'; Abada 90+1'	Stadium: Audi Field; Referee: Jair Marrufo

=== MLS Cup playoffs ===
==== Round One ====
October 28 First leg	Orlando City SC	2–0	Charlotte FC	Orlando, Florida
7:30 pm EDT	Torres 32'; Cartagena (yellow card) 62'; Ojeda 76'	Report	Biel (red card) 90+2'	Stadium: Inter&Co Stadium; Attendance: 17,787; Referee: Drew Fischer

November 1 Second leg	Charlotte FC	0–0 (3–1 p)	Orlando City SC	Charlotte, North Carolina
7:30 pm EDT	Abada (yellow card) 45'	Report	Jansson (yellow card) 35'; Schlegel (yellow card) 90+2'; Cartagena (yellow card) 90+7'	Stadium: Bank of America Stadium; Attendance: 40,238; Referee: Guido Gonzales Jr.
	Penalties
	Agyemang (penalty scored); Świderski (penalty scored); Westwood (penalty scored)		(penalty missed) Lodeiro; (penalty missed) Jansson; (penalty scored) Muriel; (penalty missed) McGuire

November 9 Third leg	Orlando City SC	1–1 (4–1 p)	Charlotte FC	Orlando, Florida
6:00 pm EST	Enrique (yellow card) 64'; Torres 90+12'	Report	Agyemang (yellow card) 40'; Malanda (yellow card) 46'; Byrne (yellow card) 52'; Świderski 81'; Bronico (yellow card) 84'; Biel (yellow card) 90+4'; Urso (yellow card) 90+7'	Stadium: Inter&Co Stadium; Attendance: 20,021; Referee: Ismir Pekmic
	Penalties
	Muriel (penalty scored); Smith (penalty scored); Torres (penalty scored); Rafael Santos (penalty scored)		(penalty missed) Biel; (penalty missed) Świderski; (penalty scored) Westwood
Note: Orlando City SC won the series 2–1.

=== Leagues Cup ===
The 2024 Leagues Cup was the second edition to feature all MLS and Liga MX teams during the month-long pause in the regular season from July to August. Charlotte FC was drawn into the East 4 group alongside the Philadelphia Union and Cruz Azul of Liga MX.

==== Group stage ====
Pos	Team	Pld	W	PW	PL	L	GF	GA	GD	Pts	Qualification
1	(United States Soccer Federation) Philadelphia Union	2	1	0	1	0	2	1	+1	4	Advance to knockout stage
2	(Mexican Football Federation) Cruz Azul	2	0	1	1	0	1	1	0	3	Advance to knockout stage
3	(United States Soccer Federation) Charlotte FC	2	0	1	0	1	0	1	−1	2	

Source: Leagues Cup
Rules for classification: Tiebreakers

July 27 Group Stage	Philadelphia Union (United States)	1–0	(United States) Charlotte FC	Chester, Pennsylvania
8:00 pm EDT	Martínez (yellow card) 1'; Baribo 33'; Gazdag (yellow card) 68'; Bedoya (yellow card) 75'	Report	Smalls (yellow card) 60'	Stadium: Subaru Park; Attendance: 18,514; Referee: Marco Ortiz

July 31 Group Stage	Charlotte FC (United States)	0–0 (4–2 p)	(Mexico) Cruz Azul	Charlotte, North Carolina
8:00 pm EDT	Bronico (yellow card) 65'; Westwood (yellow card) 65'	Report	Rotondi (yellow card) 54'; Ditta (yellow card) 65'	Stadium: Bank of America Stadium; Attendance: 13,367; Referee: Bryan Lopez
	Penalties
	Świderski (penalty scored); Westwood (penalty scored); Agyemang (penalty scored); Bronico (penalty scored)		(penalty scored) Antuna; (penalty missed) Rodríguez; (penalty scored) Rivero; (penalty missed) Romo

== Players ==
For the 2024 season, Charlotte FC were permitted a maximum of 30 signed players on the first team, of which 10 roster positions were designated for supplemental and reserve players. A base salary cap of $5.47 million applied to the non-supplemental players with exceptions for certain categories, including up to three Designated Players who counted for a set amount in the cap.

=== Roster ===
As of October 2024

Note: Flags indicate national team as defined under FIFA eligibility rules; some limited exceptions apply. Players may hold more than one non-FIFA nationality.

No.	Pos.	Nation	Player
1	GK	CRO	Kristijan Kahlina
3	DF	USA	Tim Ream
6	DF	NZL	Bill Tuiloma
7	FW	ENG	Jamie Paterson
8	MF	ENG	Ashley Westwood (captain)
9	FW	POL	Karol Świderski (DP)
9	FW	ARG	Enzo Copetti (DP)
10	MF	ESP	Pep Biel (DP; on loan from Olympiacos)
10	MF	BEL	Brecht Dejaegere
11	FW	ISR	Liel Abada (DP)
13	MF	USA	Brandt Bronico
14	DF	ENG	Nathan Byrne
15	MF	USA	Ben Bender (GA)
18	FW	COL	Kerwin Vargas
20	DF	BRA	João Pedro
21	DF	FIN	Jere Uronen
22	GK	USA	David Bingham
23	MF	SRB	Nikola Petković

No.	Pos.	Nation	Player
24	DF	USA	Jaylin Lindsey
25	FW	ENG	Tyger Smalls
26	GK	USA	Chituru Odunze
27	FW	USA	Nimfasha Berchimas (HG)
28	MF	FRA	Djibril Diani
29	DF	FRA	Adilson Malanda
30	MF	BRA	Júnior Urso
31	GK	USA	George Marks
32	DF	SEN	Hamady Diop (GA)
33	FW	USA	Patrick Agyemang
34	MF	USA	Andrew Privett
35	MF	USA	Nick Scardina
36	MF	CAN	Brandon Cambridge (HG)
37	MF	CAN	Scott Arfield
38	FW	CPV	Iuri Tavares
39	DF	USA	Jack Neeley (HG)
40	DF	USA	Jahlane Forbes
41	FW	USA	Brian Romero (HG)

==== Out on loan ====
Note: Flags indicate national team as defined under FIFA eligibility rules; some limited exceptions apply. Players may hold more than one non-FIFA nationality.

No.	Pos.	Nation	Player
11	FW	POL	Karol Świderski (on loan to Hellas Verona until July)
32	DF	SEN	Hamady Diop (GA; on loan to Čukarički until January 2025)

== Coaching staff ==
As of February 2024

Technical staff
Head coach	Dean Smith
Assistant coach	Pa-Modou Kah
Assistant coach	Christian Fuchs
Sporting director	Zoran Krnet
Head of goalkeeping	Aron Hyde
Head video coach	Rohan Sachdev

== Transfers ==
=== In ===
Incoming transfers for Charlotte FC
Player	Nat.	No.	Pos.	Previous team	Notes	Date
Chituru Odunze	United States	26	GK	Crown Legacy FC		January 18, 2024
João Pedro Reginaldo	Brazil	20	DF	Crown Legacy FC		January 18, 2024
David Bingham	United States	22	GK	Portland Timbers		January 30, 2024
Djibril Diani	France	28	MF	SM Caen		February 13, 2024
Tyger Smalls	England	25	FW	Loyola Marymount Lions	2024 MLS SuperDraft selection (14th overall)	February 14, 2024
Jahlane Forbes	United States	40	DF	Wake Forest Demon Deacons	2024 MLS SuperDraft selection (38th overall)	February 14, 2024
Nikola Petković	Serbia	25	MF	Crown Legacy FC		February 15, 2024
Iuri Tavares	Cape Verde	38	FW	Crown Legacy FC		February 20, 2024
Júnior Urso	Brazil	30	MF	Orlando City SC		February 21, 2024
Liel Abada	Israel	11	MF	Celtic	Designated Player	March 7, 2024
Karol Świderski	Poland	11	FW	Hellas Verona FC	Return from loan	July 1, 2024
Tim Ream	United States	3	DF	Fulham		August 7, 2024
Pep Biel	Spain	10	MF	Olympiacos	Designated Player; on loan until December 31, 2024	August 15, 2024
Jamie Paterson	England	7	FW	Swansea City		August 22, 2024

=== Out ===
Outgoing transfers for Charlotte FC
Player	Nat.	No.	Pos.	New team	Notes	Date
Harrison Afful	Ghana	25	DF	Crown Legacy FC	Option declined	October 30, 2023
Chris Hegardt	United States	19	MF	Stabæk	Option declined	October 30, 2023
Pablo Sisniega	Mexico	23	GK	San Antonio FC	Option declined	October 30, 2023
Jan Sobociński	Poland	2	DF	PAS Giannina F.C.	Option declined	October 30, 2023
Adrian Zendejas	United States	30	GK	Skövde AIK	Option declined	October 30, 2023
Derrick Jones	United States	20	MF	Columbus Crew	Out of contract	October 30, 2023
Justin Meram	Iraq	22	FW	Michigan Stars FC	Out of contract	October 30, 2023
McKinze Gaines	United States	17	FW	Nashville SC	Traded for 2024 MLS SuperDraft second-round pick	December 14, 2023
Karol Świderski	Poland	11	FW	Hellas Verona FC	Loaned until June 30 with option to purchase	February 1, 2024
Kamil Jóźwiak	Poland	7	FW	Granada CF		February 1, 2024
Vinicius Mello	Brazil	21	FW	FK Čukarički		February 6, 2024
Guzmán Corujo	Uruguay	4	DF	FK Čukarički		February 13, 2024
Enzo Copetti	Argentina	14	FW	Rosario Central		May 16, 2024
Scott Arfield	Canada	37	MF	Bolton Wanderers		July 12, 2024
Hamady Diop	Senegal	32	DF	FK Čukarički	On loan until January 15, 2025	July 13, 2024
Brecht Dejaegere	Belgium	10	MF	K.V. Kortrijk		August 16, 2024
