= 2022 Charlotte FC season =

Charlotte FC
2022 season
- Sporting Director: Zoran Krneta
- Head coach: Miguel Ángel Ramírez (until May 31); Christian Lattanzio (interim from May 31)
- Major League Soccer: Conference: 9th Overall: 19th
- MLS Cup Playoffs: DNQ
- U.S. Open Cup: Round of 16
- Top goalscorer: League: Karol Świderski (10); All: Karol Świderski (10)
- Highest home attendance: 74,479 vs LA Galaxy
- Lowest home attendance: 29,318 vs New England
- Average home league attendance: 35,260
- Biggest win: 5–1 at Richmond Kickers (May 11); 4–0 vs Philadelphia Union (October 1)
- Biggest defeat: 0–5 at LAFC (August 13)
Home colors	Away colors

The 2022 Charlotte FC season was the club's first season in Major League Soccer, the top division of soccer in the United States. The team was coached by Miguel Ángel Ramírez until he was fired on May 31. Assistant coach Christian Lattanzio was promoted to interim head coach.

Due to the 2022 FIFA World Cup, the season began on February 26, 2022 and concluded in October.

== Team information ==
=== Squad information ===
Appearances and goals are career totals from all-competitions as of October 9, 2022.

Squad No.	Name	Nationality	Date of birth (age)	Signed from	Signed in	Contract ends	Games played	Goals scored
Goalkeepers
1	Kristijan Kahlina	(Croatia)	July 24, 1992 (age 30)	(Bulgaria) Ludogorets Razgrad	2022	2024	32	0
23	Pablo Sisniega	(Mexico)	July 7, 1995 (age 27)	(United States) Los Angeles FC	2022	Undisclosed	2	0
30	Adrian Zendejas	(United States)	August 30, 1995 (age 27)	(United States) Minnesota United FC	2022	2023	0	0
31	George Marks	(United States)	November 10, 1999 (age 22)	(United States) Clemson Tigers	2022	2022	3	0
Defenders
2	Jan Sobociński	(Poland)	March 20, 1999 (age 23)	(Poland) ŁKS Łódź	2021	Undisclosed	11	0
3	Adam Armour	(United States)	September 27, 2002 (age 20)	(Germany) 1. FC Nürnberg	2021	2023	6	1
4	Guzmán Corujo	(Uruguay)	August 2, 1996 (age 26)	(Uruguay) Nacional	2022	2024	26	1
5	Anton Walkes	(England)	February 8, 1997 (age 25)	(United States) Atlanta United FC	2021	2024	24	0
14	Christian Makoun	(Venezuela)	March 5, 2000 (age 22)	(United States) Inter Miami CF	2022	Undisclosed	15	0
14	Nathan Byrne	(England)	June 5, 1992 (age 30)	(England) Derby County	2022	2024	5	0
21	Adilson Malanda	(France)	October 29, 2001 (age 20)	(France) Rodez	2022	2025	6	0
22	Christian Fuchs	(Austria)	April 7, 1986 (age 36)	(England) Leicester City	2021	2022	27	3
24	Jaylin Lindsey	(United States)	March 27, 2000 (age 22)	(United States) Sporting Kansas City	2021	2024	27	0
25	Harrison Afful	(Ghana)	July 24, 1986 (age 36)	(United States) Columbus Crew	2022	2022	24	1
28	Joseph Mora	(Costa Rica)	January 15, 1993 (age 29)	(United States) D.C. United	2021	2023	25	0
36	Koa Santos	(United States)	September 21, 1999 (age 23)	(United States) San Diego State Aztecs	2022	2022	3	0
Midfielders
6	Sergio Ruiz	(Spain)	December 16, 1994 (age 27)	(Spain) Racing de Santander	2020	Undisclosed	19	1
6	Nuno Santos	(Portugal)	March 2, 1999 (age 23)	(Portugal) Benfica B	2022	2024	4	1
7	Kamil Jóźwiak	(Poland)	April 22, 1998 (age 24)	(England) Derby County	2022	2025	22	0
8	Jordy Alcívar	(Ecuador)	August 5, 1999 (age 23)	(Ecuador) L.D.U. Quito	2022	2025	22	1
13	Brandt Bronico	(United States)	June 20, 1995 (age 27)	(United States) Chicago Fire FC	2020	2025	37	1
15	Ben Bender	(United States)	October 3, 2001 (age 21)	(United States) Maryland Terrapins	2022	Undisclosed	31	3
19	Chris Hegardt	(United States)	January 6, 2002 (age 20)	(United States) Georgetown Hoyas	2022	2023	3	0
20	Derrick Jones	(United States)	March 3, 1997 (age 25)	(United States) Houston Dynamo	2022	2022	19	1
21	Alan Franco	(Ecuador)	August 21, 1998 (age 24)	(Brazil) Atlético Mineiro	2022	2022	11	0
35	Quinn McNeill	(United States)	August 30, 1998 (age 24)	(United States) Clemson Tigers	2022	2022	11	1
Forwards
9	Vinicius Mello	(Brazil)	August 2, 2002 (age 20)	(Brazil) Internacional	2022	2025	0	0
10	Christian Ortiz	(Argentina)	August 20, 1992 (age 30)	(Mexico) Club Tijuana	2022	2022	17	2
11	Karol Świderski	(Poland)	January 23, 1997 (age 25)	(Greece) PAOK	2022	2025	30	10
12	Daniel Ríos	(Mexico)	February 22, 1995 (age 27)	(United States) Nashville SC	2022	2022	30	9
16	Andre Shinyashiki	(Brazil)	June 11, 1997 (age 25)	(United States) Colorado Rapids	2022	2025	23	7
17	McKinze Gaines	(United States)	March 2, 1998 (age 24)	(United States) Austin FC	2021	2022	27	3
18	Kerwin Vargas	(Colombia)	January 2, 2002 (age 20)	(Portugal) C.D. Feirense	2022	2024	14	0
26	Yordy Reyna	(Peru)	September 17, 1993 (age 29)	(United States) D.C. United	2022	2023	21	4

== Roster transactions ==
=== In ===
#	Pos.	Player	Signed from	Details	Date	Source
6	MF	(Spain) Sergio Ruiz	(Spain) Racing de Santander	Free transfer	July 8, 2020	
6	MF	(Spain) Sergio Ruiz	(Spain) Las Palmas	Loan return	December 31, 2021	
	MF	(Australia) Riley McGree	(Australia) Adelaide United	Undisclosed fee	October 5, 2020	
	MF	(Australia) Riley McGree	(England) Birmingham City	Loan return	January 1, 2022	
13	MF	(United States) Brandt Bronico	(United States) Chicago Fire FC	Draft pick exchange	December 18, 2020	
13	MF	(United States) Brandt Bronico	(United States) Charlotte Independence	Loan return	December 31, 2021	
2	DF	(Poland) Jan Sobociński	(Poland) ŁKS Łódź	Undisclosed fee	December 31, 2021	
22	DF	(Austria) Christian Fuchs	(England) Leicester City	Free transfer	June 6, 2021	
22	DF	(Austria) Christian Fuchs	(United States) Charlotte Independence	Loan return	December 31, 2021	
3	DF	(United States) Adam Armour	(Germany) 1. FC Nürnberg	Undisclosed fee	June 29, 2021	
3	DF	(United States) Adam Armour	(United States) Charlotte Independence	Loan return	December 31, 2021	
4	DF	(Uruguay) Guzmán Corujo	(Uruguay) Nacional	Free transfer	September 1, 2021	
8	MF	(Ecuador) Jordy Alcívar	(Ecuador) L.D.U. Quito	Undisclosed Fee	January 1, 2022	
23	GK	(Mexico) Pablo Sisniega	(United States) Los Angeles FC	$50,000 GAM	December 12, 2021	
24	DF	(United States) Jaylin Lindsey	(United States) Sporting Kansas City	$100,000 GAM	December 12, 2021	
9	FW	(Brazil) Vinicius Mello	(Brazil) Internacional	Undisclosed fee	December 13, 2021	
25	DF	(Ghana) Harrison Afful	(United States) Columbus Crew	Free transfer	December 17, 2021	
26	FW	(Peru) Yordy Reyna	(United States) D.C. United	Free transfer	December 17, 2021	
21	MF	(Ecuador) Alan Franco	(Brazil) Atlético Mineiro	Loan	December 21, 2021	
1	GK	(Croatia) Kristijan Kahlina	(Bulgaria) Ludogorets Razgrad	Undisclosed fee	December 28, 2021	
19	MF	(United States) Chris Hegardt	(United States) Georgetown Hoyas	$50,000 GAM	January 6, 2022	
14	DF	(Venezuela) Christian Makoun	(United States) Inter Miami CF	Draft Pick Exchange	January 10, 2022	
30	GK	(United States) Adrian Zendejas	(United States) Minnesota United FC	Free transfer	January 16, 2022	
10	FW	(Argentina) Christian Ortiz	(Mexico) Tijuana	Loan	January 19, 2022	
11	FW	(Poland) Karol Świderski	(Greece) PAOK	Undisclosed fee	January 26, 2022	
36	DF	(United States) Koa Santos	(United States) San Diego State Aztecs	Free transfer	February 22, 2022	
12	FW	(Mexico) Daniel Ríos	(United States) Nashville SC	$350,000 GAM	February 25, 2022	
20	MF	(United States) Derrick Jones	(United States) Houston Dynamo	$200,000 GAM	March 9, 2022	
7	MF	(Poland) Kamil Jóźwiak	(England) Derby County	Undisclosed fee	March 11, 2022	
35	MF	(United States) Quinn McNeill	(United States) Clemson Tigers	Free transfer	April 5, 2022	
18	FW	(Colombia) Kerwin Vargas	(Portugal) C.D. Feirense	Undisclosed fee	May 2, 2022	
16	FW	(Brazil) Andre Shinyashiki	(United States) Colorado Rapids	$225,000 GAM	May 3, 2022	
	MF	(United States) Brian Romero	(United States) Charlotte FC Academy	Homegrown	August 3, 2022	
14	DF	(England) Nathan Byrne	(England) Derby County	Undisclosed fee	August 4, 2022	
21	DF	(France) Adilson Malanda	(France) Rodez AF	Undisclosed fee	August 4, 2022	
6	MF	(Portugal) Nuno Santos	(Portugal) Benfica B	Undisclosed fee	August 4, 2022	

=== Out ===
#	Pos.	Player	To	Details	Date	Source
	MF	(Australia) Riley McGree	(England) Middlesbrough	Undisclosed fee	January 14, 2022	
35	MF	(United States) Quinn McNeill	(United States) Charlotte Independence	Loan	April 5, 2022	
30	GK	(United States) Adrian Zendejas	(United States) Charlotte Independence	Loan	April 16, 2022	
36	DF	(United States) Koa Santos	(United States) Charlotte Independence	Loan	April 16, 2022	
21	MF	(Ecuador) Alan Franco	(Argentina) Talleres	Loan transfer	June 27, 2022	
10	FW	(Argentina) Christian Ortiz	(Mexico) Tijuana	Loan return	July 26, 2022	
14	DF	(Venezuela) Christian Makoun	(United States) New England Revolution	$400,000 GAM	August 4, 2022	
6	MF	(Spain) Sergio Ruiz	(Spain) Granada CF	Undisclosed fee	August 9, 2022	

1. Despite being on loan with the Independence, Santos was recalled for some USOC and MLS matches.
2. Franco was on loan from Atlético Mineiro before being loaned to Talleres.

=== SuperDraft picks ===
Round	Selection	Position	Player	College	Notes
1	1	MF	(United States) Ben Bender	Maryland	Generation Adidas
2	1	FW	(United States) Kyle Holcomb	Wake Forest	Not signed
3	1	GK	(United States) George Marks	Clemson Tigers	Signed

=== Expansion Draft picks ===
Pick	Player	Previous team	Notes
1	(United States) McKinze Gaines	Austin FC	
2	(England) Anton Walkes	Atlanta United FC	
3	(Costa Rica) Joseph Mora	D.C. United	
4	(United States) Tristan Blackmon	Los Angeles FC	Traded to Vancouver Whitecaps FC in exchange for $475,000 of General Allocation Money.
5	(Libya) Ismael Tajouri-Shradi	New York City FC	Traded to Los Angeles FC in exchange for $400,000 of General Allocation Money.

== Competitions ==
=== Exhibitions ===
February 1 Preseason	Charlotte FC	3–0	Grenada national team	Bradenton, Florida
12:30PM EST	Obertan 30'; Bender 71'; Holcomb 89'	Report		Stadium: IMG Academy; Attendance: 0

February 8 Preseason	Charlotte FC	1–3	Nashville SC	Bradenton, Florida
12:00PM EST	Ortiz 55'	Report	Sapong 12', 16' (Loba); Bunbury 76'	Stadium: IMG Academy; Attendance: 0

February 12 CCC	Charleston Battery	1–0	Charlotte FC	Mount Pleasant, South Carolina
7:00PM EST	Apodaca 13'	Report		Stadium: Patriots Point Soccer Complex

February 15 CCC	Columbus Crew	0–0	Charlotte FC	Mount Pleasant, South Carolina
5:00PM EST		Report		Stadium: Patriots Point Soccer Complex

February 19 CCC	Inter Miami CF	2–1	Charlotte FC	Mount Pleasant, South Carolina
8:00PM EST	Campana 25' (Yedlin); Higuaín 50' (Allen)	Report	Makoun 90+1' (pen.)	Stadium: Patriots Point Soccer Complex

July 20 FC Series	Charlotte FC	1–1 (5–3 p)	Chelsea FC	Charlotte, North Carolina
7:30 PM EDT	Mora (yellow card) 47'; McNeill (yellow card) 53'; Ríos 90+2' (pen.)	Report	Pulisic (yellow card) 17' (goal) 30'; Chalobah (yellow card) 90+1'	Stadium: Bank of America Stadium; Attendance: 52,673; Referee: Rosendo Mendoza
	Penalties
	Ríos (penalty scored); Makoun (penalty scored); Walkes (penalty scored); Mora (penalty scored); Jóźwiak (penalty scored)		(penalty scored) Havertz; (penalty scored) Chilwell; (penalty missed) Gallagher; (penalty scored) Sterling

=== Major League Soccer season ===
==== Eastern Conference ====
Pos	Team	Pld	W	L	T	GF	GA	GD	Pts	Qualification
1	Philadelphia Union	34	19	5	10	72	26	+46	67	Qualification for the Conference semifinals & 2023 CONCACAF Champions League
2	CF Montréal (Note: Canadian clubs cannot qualify for the 2023 CONCACAF Champions League through the MLS regular season or playoffs.)	34	20	9	5	63	50	+13	65	Qualification for the first round
3	New York City FC	34	16	11	7	57	41	+16	55	Qualification for the first round
4	New York Red Bulls	34	15	11	8	50	41	+9	53	Qualification for the first round
5	FC Cincinnati	34	12	9	13	64	56	+8	49	Qualification for the first round
6	Inter Miami CF	34	14	14	6	47	56	−9	48	Qualification for the first round
7	Orlando City SC	34	14	14	6	44	53	−9	48	Qualification for the first round & 2023 CONCACAF Champions League (Note: as 2022 U.S. Open Cup champions)
8	Columbus Crew	34	10	8	16	46	41	+5	46	
9	Charlotte FC	34	13	18	3	44	52	−8	42	
10	New England Revolution	34	10	12	12	47	50	−3	42	
11	Atlanta United FC	34	10	14	10	48	54	−6	40	
12	Chicago Fire FC	34	10	15	9	39	48	−9	39	
13	Toronto FC	34	9	18	7	49	66	−17	34	
14	D.C. United	34	7	21	6	36	71	−35	27	

Source: MLS
Rules for classification: 1) points; 2) total wins; 3) total goal differential; 4) total goals scored; 5) fewer disciplinary points; 6) away goal differential; 7) away goals scored; 8) home goals differential; 9) home goals scored; 10) coin toss (2 clubs tied) or drawing of lots (≥3 clubs tied)

==== Overall ====
Pos	Team	Pld	W	L	T	GF	GA	GD	Pts	Qualification
17	Vancouver Whitecaps FC (Note: Canadian clubs cannot qualify for the 2023 CONCACAF Champions League through the MLS regular season or playoffs.) (V)	34	12	15	7	40	57	−17	43	Qualification for the 2023 CONCACAF Champions League (Note: As 2022 Canadian Championship winners (CAN1))
18	Colorado Rapids	34	11	13	10	46	57	−11	43	
19	Charlotte FC	34	13	18	3	44	52	−8	42	
20	New England Revolution	34	10	12	12	47	50	−3	42	
21	Seattle Sounders FC	34	12	17	5	47	46	+1	41	

Source: MLS
Rules for classification: 1) points; 2) total wins; 3) total goal differential; 4) total goals scored; 5) fewer disciplinary points; 6) away goal differential; 7) away goals scored; 8) home goals differential; 9) home goals scored; 10) coin toss (2 clubs tied) or drawing of lots (≥3 clubs tied)
(V) Canadian Championship winners

==== Results summary ====
Overall								Home						Away					
Pld	W	D	L	GF	GA	GD	Pts	W	D	L	GF	GA	GD	W	D	L	GF	GA	GD
34	13	3	18	44	52	−8	42	10	1	6	28	16	+12	3	2	12	16	36	−20

Updated to match(es) played on October 9, 2022.

==== Matches ====
February 26 1	D.C. United	3–0	Charlotte FC	Washington, D.C.
6:00PM EST	Najar (yellow card) 15'; Estrada 37' (pen.), 45+6', (yellow card) 42'; Kamara 65'; Hines-Ike (yellow card) 85'; Perez (yellow card) 87'	Report	Ortiz (yellow card) 27'	Stadium: Audi Field; Attendance: 16,412; Referee: Victor Rivas

March 5 2	Charlotte FC	0–1	LA Galaxy	Charlotte, North Carolina
8:00PM EST	Fuchs (yellow card) 37'	Report	Coulibaly (yellow card) 45+1'; Álvarez 77'	Stadium: Bank of America Stadium; Attendance: 74,479; Referee: Jair Marrufo
Note: The attendance for this game was an all time MLS record.

March 13 3	Atlanta United FC	2–1	Charlotte FC	Atlanta, Georgia
4:30 PM EDT	Martínez 60' (pen.); Campbell (yellow card) 87'; Alonso (yellow card) 90+1'; Mulraney 90+6'	Report	Ortiz (yellow card) 30'; Franco (yellow card) 36'; Armour 66'; Bronico (yellow card) 75'; Ríos (yellow card) 84'	Stadium: Mercedes-Benz Stadium; Attendance: 43,055; Referee: Guido Gonzales Jr.

March 19 4	Charlotte FC	3–1	New England Revolution	Charlotte, North Carolina
7:00 PM EDT	Świderski 6', 57'; Alcívar (yellow card) 29'; Kahlina (yellow card) 53'; Bender 64'; Franco (yellow card) 89'; Armour (yellow card) 90+5'	Report	Gonzalez (yellow card) 29'; Gil 54' (pen.); Bye (yellow card) 90+2'	Stadium: Bank of America Stadium; Attendance: 29,318; Referee: Marcos de Oliviera

March 26 5	Charlotte FC	2–0	FC Cincinnati	Charlotte, North Carolina
5:00 PM EDT	Świderski 6', 55'	Report	Badji (yellow card) 75'; Cameron (yellow card) 85'	Stadium: Bank of America Stadium; Attendance: 30,242; Referee: Alex Chilowicz

April 2 6	Philadelphia Union	2–0	Charlotte FC	Chester, Pennsylvania
7:30 PM EDT	Carranza 4'; Martinez (yellow card) 19'; Gazdag 46'; Aaronson (yellow card) 90+2'	Report		Stadium: Subaru Park; Referee: Timothy Ford

April 10 7	Charlotte FC	1–0	Atlanta United FC	Charlotte, North Carolina
1:30 PM EDT	Alcívar 11'; Bronico (yellow card) 74'; Fuchs (yellow card) 74'; Lindsey (yellow card) 85'	Report	Ibarra (yellow card) 83'	Stadium: Bank of America Stadium; Attendance: 32,496; Referee: Allen Chapman

April 16 8	New England Revolution	2–1	Charlotte FC	Foxborough, Massachusetts
7:30 PM EDT	Buksa 8'; Polster (yellow card) 29', (goal) 72'; Bye (yellow card) 87'	Report	Makoun (yellow card) 57'; Ortiz 85'	Stadium: Gillette Stadium; Attendance: 15,344; Referee: Pierre-Luc Lauziere

April 23 9	Colorado Rapids	0–0	Charlotte FC	Commerce City, Colorado
7:00 PM MDT	Lewis (yellow card) 66'	Report	Alcívar (yellow card) 44'; Corujo (yellow card) 53'; Ortiz (yellow card) 63'	Stadium: Dick's Sporting Goods Park; Attendance: 13,160; Referee: Ismir Pekmic

April 30 10	Orlando City SC	2–1	Charlotte FC	Orlando, Florida
7:30 PM EDT	Ruan 16' (yellow card) 18'; Torres 45+1'; Schlegel (yellow card) 59'; Jansson (yellow card) 88'	Report	Corujo (yellow card) 28'; Alcívar (yellow card) 54'; Fuchs 60' (pen.); Bronico (yellow card) 60'	Stadium: Exploria Stadium; Attendance: 17,012; Referee: Fotis Bazakos

May 7 11	Charlotte FC	1–0	Inter Miami CF	Charlotte, North Carolina
3:30 PM EDT	Bronico (yellow card) 32'; Shinyashiki 68'	Report		Stadium: Bank of America Stadium; Attendance: 32,018; Referee: Rubiel Vazquez

May 14 12	Charlotte FC	0–2	CF Montréal	Charlotte, North Carolina
7:00 PM EDT	Lindsey (yellow card) 53'; Alcívar (yellow card) 86'; Jóźwiak (yellow card) 90+2'	Report	Mihailovic 45' (yellow card) 56'; Torres (yellow card) 45+6'; Johnston 67'	Stadium: Bank of America Stadium; Attendance: 33,323; Referee: Silviu Petrescu

May 22 13	Charlotte FC	2–1	Vancouver Whitecaps FC	Charlotte, North Carolina
5:00 PM EDT	Shinyashiki 8'; Jóźwiak (yellow card) 62'; Ríos 85'	Report	Ricketts 2'	Stadium: Bank of America Stadium; Attendance: 32,034; Referee: Nima Saghafi

May 29 14	Seattle Sounders FC	2–1	Charlotte FC	Seattle, Washington
9:30 PM EDT	Morris 72'; Ruidiaz 80'; Morris (yellow card) 87'; Tolo (yellow card) 90+2'	Report	Bender 20'; Mora (yellow card) 35'; Shinyashiki (yellow card) 45+2'	Stadium: Lumen Field; Attendance: 32,763; Referee: Rosendo Mendoza

June 11 15	Charlotte FC	2–0	New York Red Bulls	Charlotte, North Carolina
3:00 PM EDT	Afful (yellow card) 22'; Ortiz (yellow card) 34'; Bender 45+4'; Jones 90+1'	Report	Klimala (yellow card) 44'; Yearwood (yellow card) 45+3'; Clark (yellow card) 79'	Stadium: Bank of America Stadium; Attendance: 32,064; Referee: Guido Gonzales Jr.

June 18 16	Columbus Crew	1–1	Charlotte FC	Columbus, Ohio
7:30 PM EDT	Hurtado 41', (yellow card) 59'	Report	Afful (yellow card) 15'; Shinyashiki 49'	Stadium: Lower.com Field; Attendance: 20,446; Referee: Silviu Petrescu

June 25 17	CF Montreal	2–1	Charlotte FC	Montreal, Quebec
7:30 PM EDT	Quioto 6'; Choinière 47'; Torres (yellow card) 55'; Camacho (yellow card) 70'; Waterman (yellow card) 79'	Report	Corujo 9', (yellow card) 85'; Hegardt (yellow card) 88'	Stadium: Saputo Stadium; Attendance: 13,520; Referee: Nima Saghafi

June 30 18	Charlotte FC	0–1	Austin FC	Charlotte, North Carolina
7:00 PM EDT	Pereira 62'	Report		Stadium: Bank of America Stadium; Attendance: 31,661; Referee: Timothy Ford

July 3 19	Houston Dynamo	1–2	Charlotte FC	Houston, Texas
8:30 PM EDT	Cerén (yellow card) 55'; Steres (yellow card) 72'; Picault 81'	Report	Vera 28' (o.g.); Ruiz (yellow card) 66'; Shinyashiki 74', (yellow card) 85'; Gaines (yellow card) 90+1'	Stadium: PNC Stadium; Attendance: 19,242; Referee: Jair Marrufo

July 9 20	Charlotte FC	4–1	Nashville SC	Charlotte, North Carolina
7:00 PM EDT	Fuchs 26' (pen.); Świderski 61'; Ruiz 89'; Shinyashiki 90+1'	Report	Anunga (yellow card) 21'; Mukhtar 67' (pen.); Leal (yellow card) 71'; Washington (yellow card) 90+6'	Stadium: Bank of America Stadium; Attendance: 36244; Referee: Joseph Dickerson

July 16 21	Inter Miami CF	3–2	Charlotte FC	Fort Lauderdale, Florida
8:00 PM EDT	Lowe (yellow card) 12'; Taylor 59'; Higuaín 72'; Duke (yellow card) 85'; Rodríguez 90+3'	Report	Reyna 1' 42'; Afful (yellow card) 54'; Ruiz (yellow card) 62'; Jóźwiak (yellow card) 66'; Świderski (yellow card) 71'; Corujo (yellow card) 74'	Stadium: DRV PNK Stadium; Attendance: 12,274; Referee: Jon Freemon

July 23 22	Toronto FC	4–0	Charlotte FC	Toronto, Ontario
7:30 PM EDT	Osorio 4'; Bradley 10', 45+2'; Bernardeschi 31'; Kaye (yellow card) 67'	Report	Fuchs (red card) 65'	Stadium: BMO Field; Attendance: 29,067; Referee: Filip Dujic

August 3 24	Charlotte FC	3–0	D.C. United	Charlotte, North Carolina
7:00 PM EDT	Birnbaum 13' (o.g.); Świderski 64'; McNeill 67'	Report	Canouse (yellow card) 27'	Stadium: Bank of America Stadium; Attendance: 31,520; Referee: Guido Gonzales Jr.

August 6 25	Charlotte FC	2–3	Chicago Fire FC	Charlotte, North Carolina
7:00 PM EDT	Reyna 1'; Świderski 45'; Gaines (yellow card) 68'; Jones (yellow card) 75'	Report	Przybyłko 21', 52' (yellow card) 68'; F. Navarro 24'; Sekulić (yellow card) 71'; Mueller (yellow card) 78'	Stadium: Bank of America Stadium; Attendance: 32,538; Referee: Nima Saghafi

August 13 26	Los Angeles FC	5–0	Charlotte FC	Los Angeles, California
10:30 PM EDT	Murillo 49'; Cifuentes 59'; Vela 73'; Arango 76'; Walkes 90+2' (o.g.)	Report	Alcívar (yellow card) 62'	Stadium: Banc of California Stadium; Attendance: 22,140; Referee: Chris Penso

August 17 27	New York City FC	1–3	Charlotte FC	Harrison, New Jersey
8:00 PM EDT	Chanot 28'	Report	Świderski 4' (yellow card) 16'; McNeill (yellow card) 57'; Bronico 77'; Fuchs 90+1' (pen.)	Stadium: Red Bull Arena; Attendance: 8,531; Referee: Jon Freemon

August 21 28	Charlotte FC	1–2	Orlando City SC	Charlotte, North Carolina
7:00 PM EDT	McNeill (yellow card) 23'; Gaines 66'; Jones (yellow card) 68'	Report	Mulraney (yellow card) 8'; Torres (yellow card) 42'; Carlos (yellow card) 48'; Kara 62'; Pereyra (yellow card) 82'; Akindele 89'	Stadium: Bank of America Stadium; Attendance: 30,855; Referee: Lukasz Szpala

August 27 29	Charlotte FC	0–2	Toronto FC	Charlotte, North Carolina
8:10 PM EDT	Fuchs (yellow card) 10'; Jóźwiak (yellow card) 83'	Report	Insigne 49'; Bernardeschi 66'	Stadium: Bank of America Stadium; Attendance: 32,495; Referee: Timothy Ford

September 3 30	FC Cincinnati	2–0	Charlotte FC	Cincinnati, Ohio
7:30 PM EDT	Barreal (yellow card) 23'; Hagglund 38'; Acosta 81' (yellow card) 90+2'	Report	Bender (yellow card) 58'; N. Santos (yellow card) 80'; Reyna (yellow card) 88'	Stadium: TQL Stadium; Attendance: 21,165; Referee: Michael Radchuk

September 10 31	Charlotte FC	1–0	New York City FC	Charlotte, North Carolina
1:00 PM EDT	Ríos 5'; Fuchs (red card) 56'; Walkes (yellow card) 90+4'; Bronico (yellow card) 90+6'; Shinyashiki (yellow card) 90+9'	Report	Jasson (yellow card) 47'; Rodríguez (yellow card) 74'; Callens (yellow card) 90+4'	Stadium: Bank of America Stadium; Attendance: 30,159

September 17 32	Chicago Fire FC	2–3	Charlotte FC	Chicago, Illinois
8:00 PM EDT	Pineda 3'; Durán 30' (yellow card) 39'; Bezerra (yellow card) 89'	Report	Bronico (yellow card) 39'; Świderski (yellow card) 53' (goal) 68', 90+6'; N. Santos 76'; Gaines (yellow card) 79'	Stadium: Soldier Field; Attendance: 21,450; Referee: Tori Penso

October 1 33	Charlotte FC	4–0	Philadelphia Union	Charlotte, North Carolina
7:00 PM EDT	Ríos 24', 54', 72' (pen.), 90+1'; Bronico (yellow card) 56'	Report	Wagner (yellow card) 39' (yellow-red card) 71'; Gazdag (yellow card) 79'	Stadium: Bank of America Stadium; Attendance: 43,860; Referee: Jon Freemon

October 5 23	Charlotte FC	2–2	Columbus Crew	Charlotte, North Carolina
7:00 PM EDT	Mora (yellow card) 50'; Ríos 58'; Shinyashiki 90+4'	Report	Zelarayán 36'; Díaz 54' (yellow card) 87'; Hernández (yellow card) 88'; Room (yellow card) 90+3'; Etienne (yellow card) 90+5'	Stadium: Bank of America Stadium; Attendance: 34,122; Referee: Matthew Conger
Note: Match play suspended in the 16th minute due to inclement weather on July 30. To be resumed at this date and time.

October 9 34	New York Red Bulls	2–0	Charlotte FC	Harrison, New Jersey
3:00 EDT	Manoel 8', 55'; Edelman (yellow card) 83'; Long (yellow card) 90+5'	Report	Afful (yellow card) 40'	Stadium: Red Bull Arena; Attendance: 23,672; Referee: Rubiel Vazquez

=== U.S. Open Cup ===
Charlotte FC made their Open Cup debut in the Third Round.

April 20 Third Round	Greenville Triumph SC (USL1)	1–2 (a.e.t.)	Charlotte FC (MLS)	Greenville, South Carolina
7:00 pm EDT	Keegan 59'; Labovitz (yellow card) 85'; Filerman (yellow card) 105+4'	Report	Afful (yellow card) 31', (goal) 105+1'; Ortiz 39'; Ríos (yellow card) 65'; Ruiz (yellow card) 68'	Stadium: Legacy Early College Field; Attendance: 4,064; Referee: Kevin Broadley

May 11 Round of 32	Richmond Kickers (USL1)	1–5	Charlotte FC (MLS)	Richmond, Virginia
6:30 PM EDT	Morán 53'	Report	Sobociński (yellow card) 4'; Ríos 34'; Reyna 54'; Gaines 58', 61'; Shinyashiki 86'	Stadium: City Stadium; Attendance: 4,621; Referee: Luis Arroyo

May 25 Round of 16	New York Red Bulls (MLS)	3–1	Charlotte FC (MLS)	Montclair, New Jersey
8:00 PM EDT	Klimala 2'; D. Nealis (yellow card) 26', (goal) 63'; Edelman (yellow card) 45+1'; Edwards (yellow card) 72'; S. Nealis (yellow card) 88'; Barlow 90+2'	Report	Ríos 8'; Bronico (yellow card) 23'; Alcívar (yellow card) 90'	Stadium: MSU Soccer Park; Attendance: 3,500; Referee: Ernie Constantine

== Statistics ==
=== Appearances and goals ===
Numbers after plus-sign (+) denote appearances as a substitute.

No.	Pos	Nat	Player	Total		MLS		U.S. Open Cup	
No.	Pos	Nat	Player	Apps	Goals	Apps	Goals	Apps	Goals
Goalkeepers
1	GK	(Croatia) CRO	Kristijan Kahlina	32	0	31	0	1	0
23	GK	(Mexico) MEX	Pablo Sisniega	2	0	2	0	0	0
31	GK	(United States) USA	George Marks	3	0	1	0	2	0
Defenders
2	DF	(Poland) POL	Jan Sobociński	11	0	3+6	0	2	0
3	DF	(United States) USA	Adam Armour	6	1	0+5	1	1	0
4	DF	(Uruguay) URU	Guzmán Corujo	26	1	25	1	1	0
5	DF	(England) ENG	Anton Walkes	24	0	21+2	0	1	0
14	DF	(England) ENG	Nathan Byrne	5	0	3+2	0	0	0
21	DF	(France) FRA	Adilson Malanda	6	0	6	0	0	0
22	DF	(Austria) AUT	Christian Fuchs	27	3	22+4	3	0+1	0
24	DF	(United States) USA	Jaylin Lindsey	27	0	19+7	0	0+1	0
25	DF	(Ghana) GHA	Harrison Afful	24	1	15+6	0	3	1
28	DF	(Costa Rica) CRC	Joseph Mora	25	0	18+5	0	2	0
Midfielders
6	MF	(Portugal) POR	Nuno Santos	4	1	1+3	1	0	0
7	MF	(Poland) POL	Kamil Jóźwiak	22	0	13+6	0	1+2	0
8	MF	(Ecuador) ECU	Jordy Alcívar	22	1	11+9	1	2	0
13	MF	(United States) USA	Brandt Bronico	37	1	32+2	1	1+2	0
15	MF	(United States) USA	Ben Bender	31	3	19+9	3	1+2	0
20	MF	(United States) USA	Derrick Jones	19	1	10+6	1	2+1	0
35	MF	(United States) USA	Quinn McNeill	11	1	10+1	1	0	0
Forwards
9	FW	(Brazil) BRA	Vinicius Mello	0	0	0	0	0	0
11	FW	(Poland) POL	Karol Świderski	30	10	29+1	10	0	0
12	FW	(Mexico) MEX	Daniel Ríos	30	9	15+12	7	2+1	2
16	FW	(Brazil) BRA	Andre Shinyashiki	23	7	8+13	6	1+1	1
17	FW	(United States) USA	McKinze Gaines	27	3	11+13	1	2+1	2
18	FW	(Colombia) COL	Kerwin Vargas	14	0	8+5	0	0+1	0
26	FW	(Peru) PER	Yordy Reyna	21	4	10+9	3	2	1
Left after start of season
6	MF	(Spain) ESP	Sergio Ruiz	19	1	8+10	1	1	0
10	FW	(Argentina) ARG	Christian Ortiz	17	2	8+7	1	2	1
14	DF	(Venezuela) VEN	Christian Makoun	15	0	8+5	0	2	0
19	MF	(United States) USA	Chris Hegardt	3	0	0+3	0	0	0
21	MF	(Ecuador) ECU	Alan Franco	11	0	9+1	0	0+1	0
30	GK	(United States) USA	Adrian Zendejas	0	0	0	0	0	0
36	DF	(United States) USA	Koa Santos	3	0	1	0	1+1	0

- Last updated: October 9, 2022
- Source: Team Stats

=== Goalscorers ===
Rank	No.	Pos.	Nat.	Name	MLS	U.S. Open Cup	Total
1	11	FW	(Poland)	Karol Świderski	10	0	10
2	12	FW	(Mexico)	Daniel Ríos	7	2	9
3	16	FW	(Brazil)	Andre Shinyashiki	6	1	7
4	26	FW	(Peru)	Yordy Reyna	3	1	4
5	15	MF	(United States)	Ben Bender	3	0	3
5	22	DF	(Austria)	Christian Fuchs	3	0	3
5	17	FW	(United States)	McKinze Gaines	1	2	3
8	10	FW	(Argentina)	Christian Ortiz	1	1	2
9	25	DF	(Ghana)	Harrison Afful	0	1	1
9	8	MF	(Ecuador)	Jordy Alcívar	1	0	1
9	3	DF	(United States)	Adam Armour	1	0	1
9	13	MF	(United States)	Brandt Bronico	1	0	1
9	4	DF	(Uruguay)	Guzmán Corujo	1	0	1
9	20	MF	(United States)	Derrick Jones	1	0	1
9	25	MF	(United States)	Quinn McNeill	1	0	1
9	6	FW	(Spain)	Sergio Ruiz	1	0	1
9	6	MF	(Portugal)	Nuno Santos	1	0	1
Own Goals					2	0	2
Totals					44	8	52

- Last updated: October 9, 2022
- Source: Competitive matches

=== Assists ===
Rank	No.	Pos.	Nat.	Name	MLS	U.S. Open Cup	Total
1	15	MF	(United States)	Ben Bender	6	0	6
1	26	FW	(Peru)	Yordy Reyna	3	3	6
1	11	FW	(Poland)	Karol Świderski	6	0	6
4	17	FW	(United States)	McKinze Gaines	4	0	4
4	7	MF	(Poland)	Kamil Jóźwiak	3	1	4
6	13	MF	(United States)	Brandt Bronico	3	0	3
6	10	FW	(Argentina)	Christian Ortiz	2	1	3
6	6	MF	(Spain)	Sergio Ruiz	3	0	3
9	24	DF	(United States)	Jaylin Lindsey	2	0	2
9	35	MF	(United States)	Quinn McNeill	2	0	2
9	12	FW	(Mexico)	Daniel Ríos	2	0	2
12	8	MF	(Ecuador)	Jordy Alcívar	1	0	1
12	21	MF	(Ecuador)	Alan Franco	1	0	1
12	22	DF	(Austria)	Christian Fuchs	1	0	1
12	21	DF	(France)	Adilson Malanda	1	0	1
12	36	DF	(United States)	Koa Santos	1	0	1
12	6	MF	(Portugal)	Nuno Santos	1	0	1
12	16	FW	(Brazil)	Andre Shinyashiki	0	1	1
12	18	FW	(Colombia)	Kerwin Vargas	1	0	1
Totals					43	6	49

- Last updated: October 9, 2022
- Source: Competitive matches

=== Disciplinary record ===
N	P	Nat.	Name	MLS			U.S. Open Cup			Total			Notes
N	P	Nat.	Name	Yellow card	Second yellow card	Red card	Yellow card	Second yellow card	Red card	Yellow card	Second yellow card	Red card	Notes
13	MF	(United States)	Brandt Bronico	7			1			8			
8	MF	(Ecuador)	Jordy Alcívar	5			1			6			
25	DF	(Ghana)	Harrison Afful	4			1			5			
4	DF	(Uruguay)	Guzmán Corujo	4						4			
7	MF	(Poland)	Kamil Jóźwiak	4						4			
10	FW	(Argentina)	Christian Ortiz	4						4			
22	DF	(Austria)	Christian Fuchs	3		2				3		2	
17	FW	(United States)	McKinze Gaines	3						3			
20	MF	(United States)	Derrick Jones	3						3			
6	MF	(Spain)	Sergio Ruiz	2			1			3			
16	FW	(Brazil)	Andre Shinyashiki	3						3			
11	FW	(Poland)	Karol Świderski	3						3			
21	MF	(Ecuador)	Alan Franco	2						2			
24	DF	(United States)	Jaylin Lindsey	2						2			
35	MF	(United States)	Quinn McNeill	2						2			
28	DF	(Costa Rica)	Joseph Mora	2						2			
12	FW	(Mexico)	Daniel Ríos	1			1			2			
3	DF	(United States)	Adam Armour	1						1			
15	MF	(United States)	Ben Bender	1						1			
19	MF	(United States)	Chris Hegardt	1						1			
1	GK	(Croatia)	Kristijan Kahlina	1						1			
14	DF	(Venezuela)	Christian Makoun	1						1			
26	FW	(Peru)	Yordy Reyna	1						1			
6	MF	(Portugal)	Nuno Santos	1						1			
2	DF	(Poland)	Jan Sobociński				1			1			
5	DF	(England)	Anton Walkes	1						1			

Last updated: October 9, 2022
Source: Competitive matches
Only competitive matches
(yellow card) = Number of bookings; (second yellow card) = Number of sending offs after a second yellow card; (red card) = Number of sending offs by a direct red card.
