= Makoun =

Makoun is a surname. Notable people with the surname include:

- Christian Makoun (born 2000), Venezuelan-Cameroonian footballer
- Jean Makoun (born 1983), Cameroonian footballer
