= Brandt Bronico =

American soccer player (born 1995)

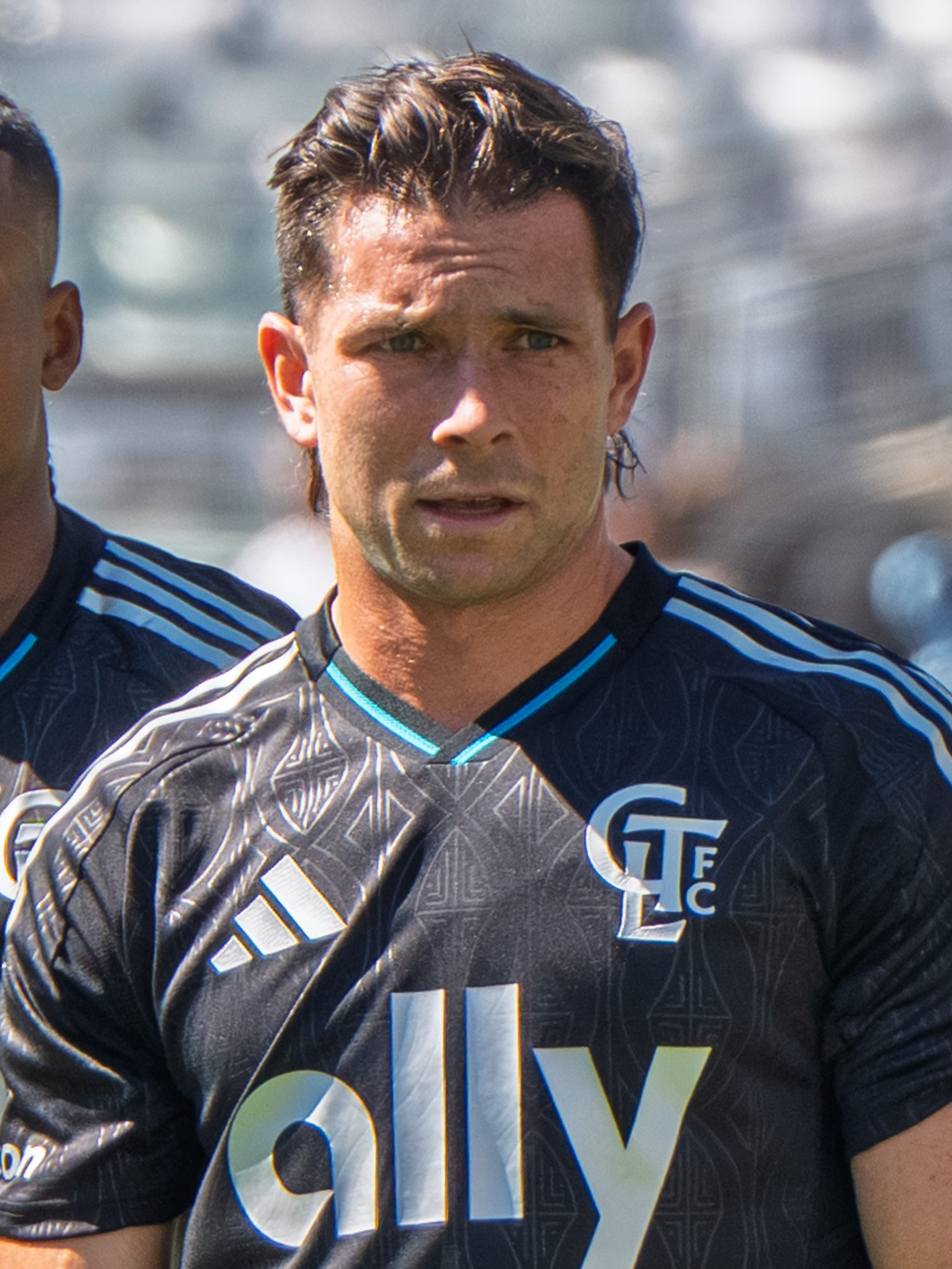
- Bronico with Charlotte FC in 2025

Personal information
- Full name: Brandt James Bronico
- Date of birth: June 20, 1995 (age 31)
- Place of birth: Westminster, Maryland, United States
- Height: 5 ft 8 in (1.73 m)
- Position: Midfielder

Team information
- Current team: Charlotte FC
- Number: 13

Youth career
- 2009–2013: North Carolina Fusion

College career
Years	Team	Apps	(Gls)
2013–2016	Charlotte 49ers	74	(27)

Senior career*
Years	Team	Apps	(Gls)
2013–2014	Carolina Dynamo	23	(6)
2015	Seattle Sounders FC U-23	9	(4)
2016	Carolina Dynamo	9	(2)
2017–2020	Chicago Fire	66	(2)
2017	→ Tulsa Roughnecks (loan)	8	(0)
2021–	Charlotte FC	148	(6)
2021	→ Charlotte Independence (loan)	31	(1)
- * Club domestic league appearances and goals as of November 15, 2026

Brandt James Bronico (born June 20, 1995) is an American professional soccer player who plays as a midfielder for Major League Soccer club Charlotte FC.

== Career ==
After spending four years at University of North Carolina at Charlotte, Bronico was drafted as the 47th overall pick in the 2017 MLS SuperDraft by Chicago Fire.

In college, Bronico finished 2016 as First Team NSCAA All-Southeast Region, Player of the Year Conference USA, Offensive MVP Conference USA, First Team All Conference USA and Golden Boot Winner Conference USA.

He made his professional debut on March 11, 2017, as an 85th-minute substitute in a 2–0 win over Real Salt Lake.

On November 30, 2020, Chicago announced they had declined their contract option on Bronico. On December 18, 2020, Charlotte FC acquired the rights to Bronico ahead of their entry in to Major League Soccer beginning in 2022.

On March 17, 2021, Bronico joined USL Championship side Charlotte Independence on loan for their 2021 season.

== Career statistics ==
As of match played 9 November 2024

Appearances and goals by club, season and competition
Club	Season	League			National cup		Continental		Other		Total	
Club	Season	Division	Apps	Goals	Apps	Goals	Apps	Goals	Apps	Goals	Apps	Goals
Chicago Fire	2017	Major League Soccer	4	0	0	0	—		4	0	8	0
Chicago Fire	2018	Major League Soccer	23	1	4	0	—		—		27	1
Chicago Fire	2019	Major League Soccer	29	1	1	0	—		1	0	31	1
Chicago Fire	2020	Major League Soccer	10	0	—		—		—		10	0
Chicago Fire	Total		66	2	5	0	—		5	0	76	2
Tulsa Roughnecks (loan)	2017	United Soccer League	8	0	0	0	—		—		8	0
Charlotte FC	2022	Major League Soccer	34	1	3	0	—		—		37	1
Charlotte FC	2023	Major League Soccer	32	1	3	0	—		6	1	41	2
Charlotte FC	2024	Major League Soccer	25	1	—		—		5	0	30	1
Charlotte FC	Total		91	3	6	0	—		11	1	108	4
Charlotte Independence (loan)	2021	United Soccer League	31	1	—		—		2	0	33	1
Career total			196	6	11	0	0	0	18	1	225	6
