= Anton Walkes =

English footballer (1997–2023)

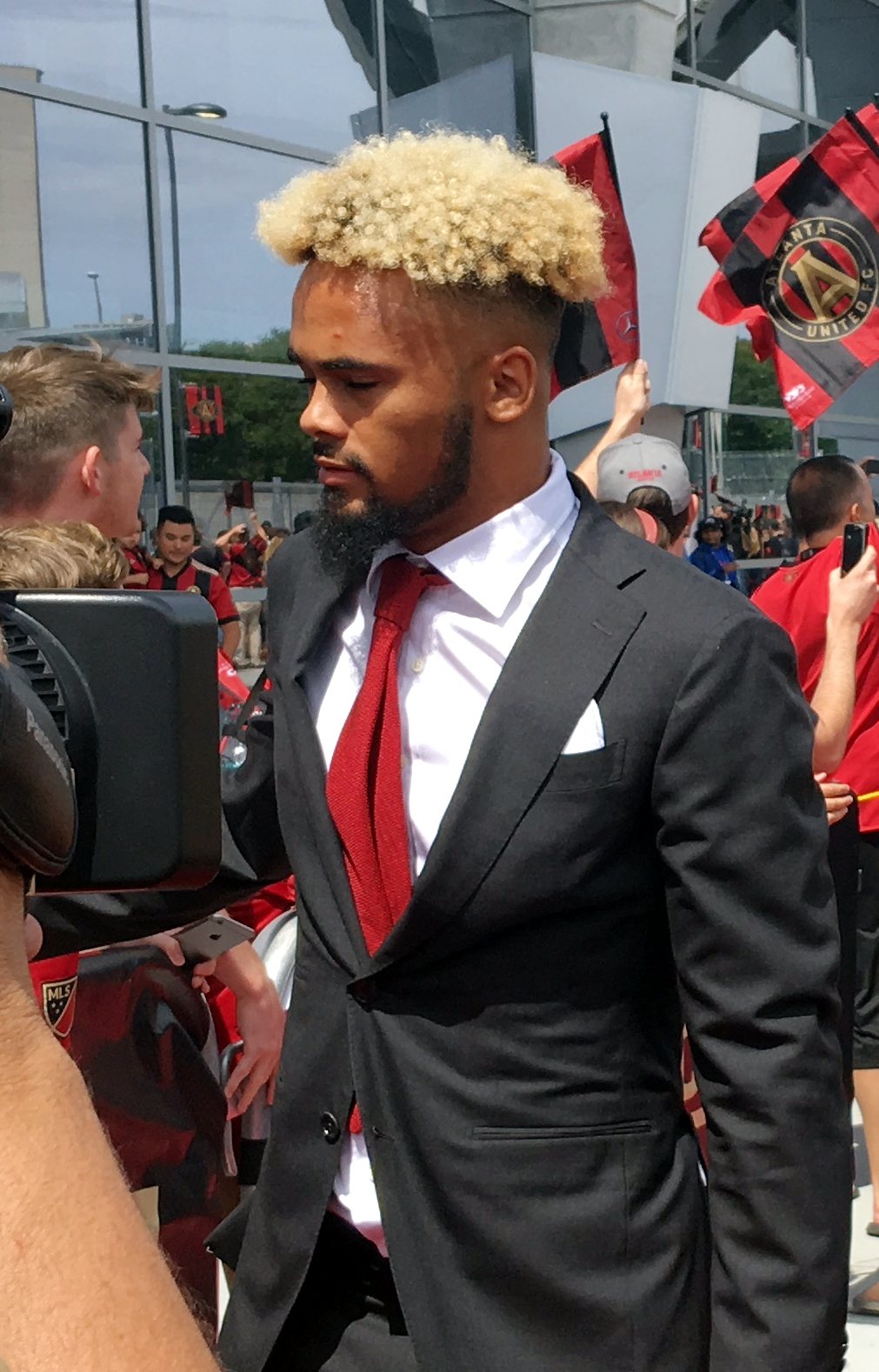
- Walkes after signing for Atlanta United in 2017

Personal information
- Full name: Anton Charles Walkes
- Date of birth: 8 February 1997
- Place of birth: Lewisham, London, England
- Date of death: 19 January 2023 (aged 25)
- Place of death: Miami, Florida, US
- Height: 6 ft 2 in (1.87 m)
- Positions: Defender; midfielder

Youth career
- 2013–2017: Tottenham Hotspur

Senior career*
Years	Team	Apps	(Gls)
2016–2018	Tottenham Hotspur	0	(0)
2017	→ Atlanta United (loan)	20	(2)
2018	→ Portsmouth (loan)	12	(1)
2018–2020	Portsmouth	35	(1)
2020–2021	Atlanta United	50	(2)
2022–2023	Charlotte FC	23	(0)
Total		140	(6)
- * Club domestic league appearances and goals

Anton Charles Walkes (8 February 1997 – 19 January 2023) was an English professional footballer who played as a defender or midfielder.

Walkes began his club career with Premier League club Tottenham Hotspur, making one appearance for the club in the League Cup. In 2017, he was loaned to Atlanta United until the end of the 2017 season. Walkes was then loaned out to League One club Portsmouth, playing the remainder of the 2017–18 season before being signed by Portsmouth permanently in July 2018. He spent two further seasons with Portsmouth, winning the EFL Trophy in 2019, before returning to Atlanta United in January 2020. He was signed by Charlotte FC in 2022, where he remained until his death a year later due to a boat crash in Miami, Florida.

== Club career ==
=== Tottenham Hotspur ===
Walkes began his career with Tottenham Hotspur, joining the club in July 2013.

He made his first team debut on 21 September 2016 in the EFL Cup against Gillingham, coming on as a substitute in the 80th minute in a 5–0 victory. Walkes appeared three times as captain in the group stage of UEFA Youth League, including twice against Bayer Leverkusen.

The following year, on 27 September 2017, he signed a two-year contract extension with the club, keeping him until 2019. After his loan spell at Atlanta United, Walkes returned briefly to the reserve side before being loaned out again.

==== Atlanta United (loan) ====
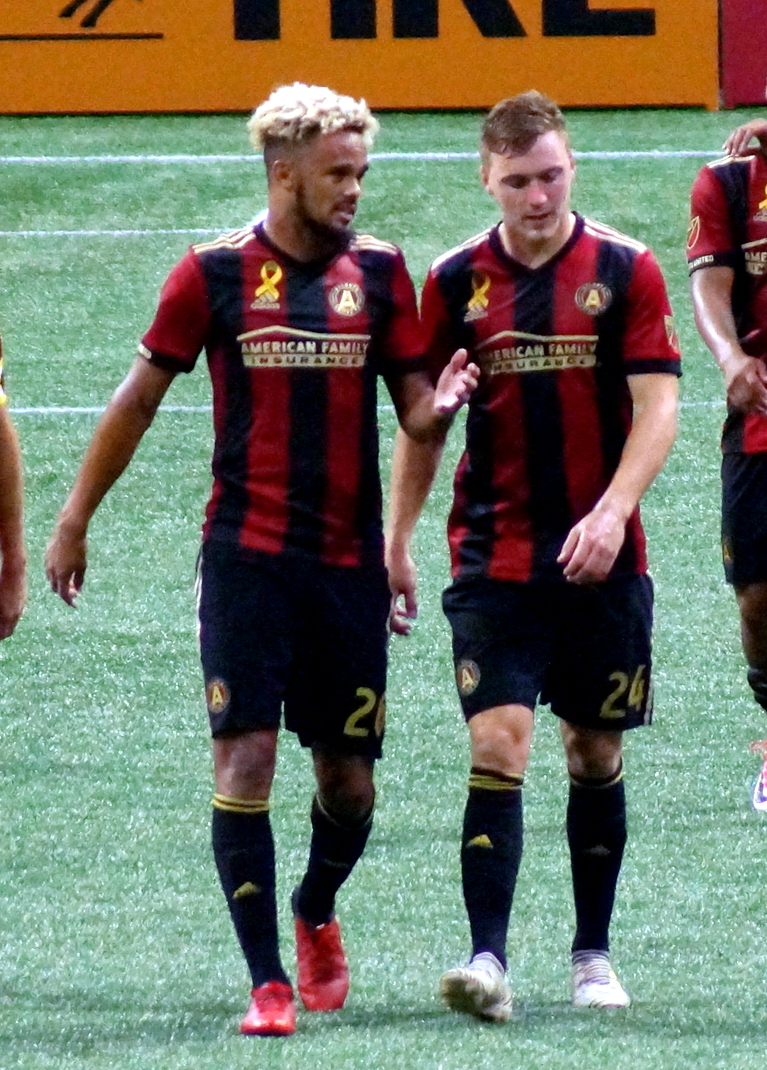
Walkes with Julian Gressel during Atlanta United's inaugural season.

On 26 January 2017, Walkes joined Major League Soccer club Atlanta United ahead of the club's inaugural season. Walkes made his Atlanta United debut, in the opening game of the season, coming on as a late substitute but scored an own goal shortly after, in a 2–1 loss against New York Red Bulls. Despite his own injury concerns and initially starting out on the substitute bench, Walkes quickly regained his first team place for the side, establishing himself in the right-back position. He then scored his first goal for the club on 5 July 2017, in a 4–2 win over San Jose Earthquakes.

On 1 August 2017, his loan spell with Atlanta United was extended until the end of the season. He continued to regain his place for the rest of the season. Walkes then scored his second goal for the club on 14 September 2017, in a 7–0 win over New England Revolution.

At the end of the 2017 season, Walkes went on to make 20 appearances and scoring 2 times in all competitions and returned to his parent club. Reflecting on his time at Atlanta United, he said his loan spell there helped push on for first team football.

=== Portsmouth ===
Walkes signed on loan for EFL League One club Portsmouth on 29 January 2018. He scored on his debut, in a 2–2 draw against Doncaster Rovers on 3 February. Since making his debut for the club, he established himself in the starting eleven at a right-back position. This lasted until early April when he suffered a hamstring injury that made him miss the rest of the season. He made 12 appearances in his loan and scored once, then returned to his parent club.

On 18 July 2018, Portsmouth announced they had signed Walkes on a two-year deal with an option on a third year for an undisclosed fee. He was part of the side that won the 2019 EFL Trophy Final on 31 March, replacing Ben Close for the final seven minutes before a penalty shootout win over Sunderland.

=== Atlanta United ===
On 9 January 2020, Walkes returned to Major League Soccer club Atlanta United, three seasons following his loan with the club. He made his club debut on 18 February in the CONCACAF Champions League against Motagua, starting in the 1–1 draw.

=== Charlotte FC ===
On 14 December 2021, Walkes was selected by Charlotte FC in the 2021 MLS Expansion Draft. He made 23 appearances for the club, starting in 21 matches during the club's inaugural season.

== Personal life and death ==
Born in Lewisham, Walkes was of Bajan descent on his father's side, and Welsh descent on his mother's side.

In November 2018, Walkes pleaded guilty to driving while disqualified, being fined and receiving a sentence of 120 hours of community service.

On 18 January 2023, Walkes was in Miami, Florida where Charlotte FC was holding a twelve-day training camp. At around 3 p.m. Eastern Time, he was injured in a two-boat collision near Miami Marine Stadium. He was taken to hospital, where he died from his injuries the following morning, at the age of 25. He is survived by his partner, Alexis, and daughter named Ayla.

== Career statistics ==
Appearances and goals by club, season and competition
Club	Season	League			National cup		League cup		Continental		Other		Total	
Club	Season	Division	Apps	Goals	Apps	Goals	Apps	Goals	Apps	Goals	Apps	Goals	Apps	Goals
Tottenham Hotspur	2016–17	Premier League	0	0	0	0	1	0	0	0	—		1	0
Atlanta United (loan)	2017	Major League Soccer	20	2	2	0	—		—		1	0	23	2
Portsmouth (loan)	2017–18	League One	12	1	0	0	—		—		0	0	12	1
Portsmouth	2018–19	League One	24	1	3	0	1	0	—		7 (Note: Appearances in EFL Trophy)	0	35	1
Portsmouth	2019–20	League One	11	0	3	0	2	0	—		3	1	19	1
Portsmouth	Total		47	2	6	0	3	0	0	0	11	1	66	3
Atlanta United	2020	Major League Soccer	17 (Note: Includes two appearances in MLS is Back Tournament group stage)	0	—		—		3 (Note: Appearances in CONCACAF Champions League)	0	—		20	0
Atlanta United	2021	Major League Soccer	33	2	—		—		3	0	—		36	2
Atlanta United	Total		50	2	0	0	0	0	6	0	0	0	56	2
Charlotte FC	2022	Major League Soccer	23	0	1	0	—		—		—		24	0
Career total			140	6	9	0	4	0	6	0	11	1	170	7

== Honours ==
Portsmouth

- EFL Trophy: 2018–19
