= Ben Bender =

American soccer player (born 2001)

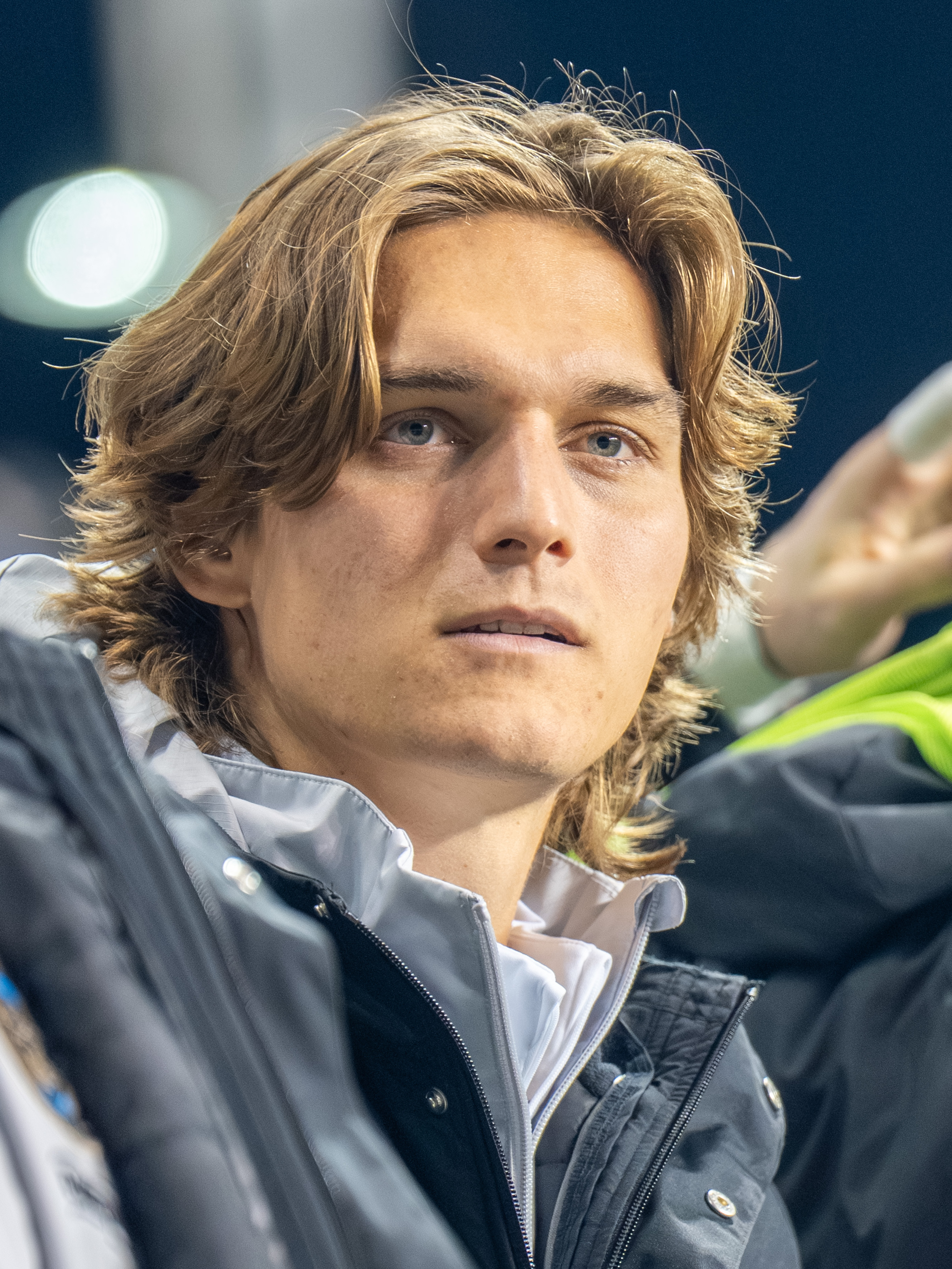
- Bender with the Philadelphia Union in 2025

Personal information
- Full name: Benjamin Bender
- Date of birth: March 7, 2001 (age 25)
- Place of birth: Baltimore, Maryland, U.S.
- Height: 6 ft 0 in (1.83 m)
- Position: Midfielder

Team information
- Current team: Philadelphia Union
- Number: 16

Youth career
- 2009–2015: Fewster FC
- 2015–2016: Philadelphia Union
- 2016–2020: Baltimore Armour

College career
Years	Team	Apps	(Gls)
2020–2021	Maryland Terrapins	29	(9)

Senior career*
Years	Team	Apps	(Gls)
2021	Baltimore Christos	7	(6)
2022–2025	Charlotte FC	51	(7)
2023	→ Crown Legacy FC (loan)	1	(0)
2024	→ Tampa Bay Rowdies (loan)	9	(0)
2025–	Philadelphia Union	15	(1)
- * Club domestic league appearances and goals as of August 8, 2026

Benjamin Bender (born March 7, 2001) is an American professional soccer player who plays as a midfielder for the Philadelphia Union of Major League Soccer. He was the first overall selection in the 2022 MLS SuperDraft.

== Career ==
=== Youth and college ===
Prior to playing college soccer, Bender played youth soccer, from the age of 6 through 15 for Coach Barry Stitz and Fewster FC. The one-team, independent Fewster FC Club won 4 Maryland State Cups, 2 USYSA Regional Championships and played for the U15 USYSA National Championships in 2015 2015 USYSA U15 National Championships page. After USYSA changed their age categories (to birth year), Bender then played academy soccer, one season for the Philadelphia Union academy and four years for Baltimore Armour. Concurrently, Bender played high school soccer for Calvert Hall College High School in Towson, Maryland. With Calvert Hall, Bender served as the team's captain, being named an Allstate All-American his junior year, and earning honors from TopDrawerSoccer.com, All-Maryland Interscholastic Athletic Association honors, and was named a Baltimore Sun All-Metro selection.

Ahead of the 2020 NCAA Division I men's soccer season, Bender signed a National Letter of Intent to play collegiately for the University of Maryland, College Park. Due to the COVID-19 pandemic and its impact on sporting events, Bender did not make his Maryland debut until February 19, 2021, starting in a 2–3 loss to Penn State. On March 27, 2021, Bender scored his first collegiate goal against Northwestern University. Bender would finish the 2020 season appearing in all 11 matches for the Terrapins, scoring twice.

=== Professional ===
Following his freshman season with Maryland, he signed a Generation adidas contract with Major League Soccer, an expected top five draft pick, Bender was selected first overall in the 2022 MLS SuperDraft by Charlotte FC. Bender became the third ever player from the University of Maryland to be selected first overall in the MLS SuperDraft, and the first since Maurice Edu was selected first overall in 2007.

On September 6, 2024, Bender was loaned out to USL Championship side Tampa Bay Rowdies until the end of the season. During this move, Charlotte also excersised a contract extension keeping Bender at the North Carolina club until the end of the 2025 season.

On April 25, 2025, Bender was waived by Charlotte.

On May 9, 2025, Bender signed with Philadelphia Union for the remainder of the 2025 season.

== Career statistics ==
=== Club ===
As of match played on July 14, 2024

Club statistics
Club	Season	League			National cup		Continental		Other		Total	
Club	Season	Division	Apps	Goals	Apps	Goals	Apps	Goals	Apps	Goals	Apps	Goals
Charlotte FC	2022	MLS	28	3	3	0	—		—		31	3
Charlotte FC	2023	MLS	17	3	1	0	—		5 (Note: Appearances in Leagues Cup)	1	23	4
Charlotte FC	2024	MLS	6	1	—		—		1	0	7	1
Charlotte FC	Total		51	7	4	0	0	0	6	1	61	8
Career total			51	7	4	0	0	0	6	1	61	8

== Honors ==
Philadelphia Union

- Supporters' Shield: 2025

Individual

- NPSL Young Player of the Year: 2021
