= 2021 MLS expansion draft =

Player draft for MLS teams

2021 MLS Expansion Draft

General information
- Date: December 14, 2021

Overview
- 5 total selections in 5 rounds
- Expansion teams: Charlotte FC
- Expansion season: 2022

The 2021 MLS Expansion Draft was a special draft for the Major League Soccer expansion team Charlotte FC that was held on December 14, 2021. The list of exposed players was revealed on December 13, 2021. The picks were made on December 14, 2021 at 7:00 PM ET with Charlotte selecting McKinze Gaines, Anton Walkes, Joseph Mora, Tristan Blackmon, and Ismael Tajouri-Shradi.

== Format ==
Teams who had players selected in the 2020 MLS Expansion Draft are exempt. These teams are San Jose Earthquakes, New York Red Bulls, Nashville SC, LA Galaxy, and Orlando City SC. All other teams from the 2021 season are subject to the draft. These teams have 12 protection slots that they may apply to any draft eligible player on their senior, supplemental, and reserve rosters. Players who have not graduated from Generation Adidas, and homegrown players age 25 and under as of the end of the 2021 season are not eligible for the draft. Players with contracts expiring at the end of the season, designated players, and players with no-trade clauses are part of a team's roster and are eligible for the draft. In the case of player's with no-trade clauses, a team must use one of their protection slots for that player. If a team has a players selected in the draft, that team becomes exempt from any further picks in the draft. The expansion team, Charlotte FC was given 5 picks for the draft.

== Expansion Draft picks ==
Pick	MLS team	Player	Previous team	Notes
1	Charlotte FC	McKinze Gaines	Austin FC	
2	Charlotte FC	Anton Walkes	Atlanta United FC	
3	Charlotte FC	Joseph Mora	D.C. United	
4	Charlotte FC	Tristan Blackmon	Los Angeles FC	Traded to Vancouver Whitecaps FC in exchange for $475,000 of General Allocation Money.
5	Charlotte FC	Ismael Tajouri-Shradi	New York City FC	Traded to Los Angeles FC in exchange for $400,000 of General Allocation Money.

== Team-by-team-breakdown ==
=== Atlanta United FC ===
Exposed
Mo Adams
Mikey Ambrose
Josh Bauer
Jürgen Damm
Alex DeJohn
Ronald Hernández
Emerson Hyndman
Alec Kann
Erik López
Ben Lundgaard
Jake Mulraney
Amar Sejdič
Erick Torres
Anton Walkes

=== Austin FC ===
Exposed
McKinze Gaines
Jon Gallagher
Danny Hoesen
Hector Jiménez
Freddy Kleemann
Kekuta Manneh
Will Pulisic
Aaron Schoenfeld
Brady Scott
Ulises Segura
Aedan Stanley
Jared Stroud
Ben Sweat
Andrew Tarbell

=== Chicago Fire FC ===
Exposed
Robert Berić
Francisco Calvo
Elliot Collier
Johan Kappelhof
Kenneth Kronholm
Álvaro Medrán
Bobby Shuttleworth
Luka Stojanović

=== FC Cincinnati ===
Exposed
Edgar Castillo
Allan Cruz
Chris Duvall
Jonas Fjeldberg
Avionne Flanagan
Joe Gyau
Yuya Kubo
Ben Lundt
Kamohelo Mokotjo
Caleb Stanko
Przemysław Tytoń
Florian Valot
Maikel van der Werff
Kenneth Vermeer

=== Colorado Rapids ===
Exposed
Dominique Badji
Steven Beitashour
Clint Irwin
Jeremy Kelly
Nicolás Mezquida
Drew Moor
Younes Namli
Andre Rawls
Diego Rubio
Collen Warner

=== Columbus Crew ===
Exposed
Saad Abdul-Salaam
Harrison Afful
Evan Bush
Eric Dick
Waylon Francis
Marlon Hairston
Erik Hurtado
Perry Kitchen
Grant Lillard
Kevin Molino
Josh Williams
Vito Wormgoor
Bradley Wright-Phillips

=== D.C. United ===
Exposed
Ramón Ábila
Yamil Asad
Jovanny Bolívar
Frédéric Brillant
Michael DeShields
Jon Kempin
Felipe
Joseph Mora
Júnior Moreno
Chris Odoi-Atsem
Yordy Reyna
Chris Seitz
Drew Skundrich
Kimarni Smith
Erik Sorga

=== FC Dallas ===
Exposed
Bryan Acosta
Bressan
Caiser Gomes
Phelipe Megiolaro
Andrés Ricaurte
Freddy Vargas
Kyle Zobeck

=== Houston Dynamo FC ===
Exposed
Mateo Bajamich
José Bizama
Darwin Cerén
Joe Corona
Maynor Figueroa
Alejandro Fuenmayor
Boniek García
Ian Hoffmann
Ariel Lassiter
Nico Lemoine
Marko Marić
Kyle Morton
Michael Nelson
Darwin Quintero
Maximiliano Urruti

=== Los Angeles FC ===
Exposed
Jamal Blackman
Tristan Blackmon
Daniel Crisostomo
Raheem Edwards
Julian Gaines
Francisco Ginella
Jordan Harvey
Sebastien Ibeagha
Cal Jennings
Danny Musovski
Michee Ngalina
Alvaro Quezada
Diego Rossi
Mohamed Traore

=== Inter Miami CF ===
Exposed
George Acosta
Ventura Alvarado
Dylan Castanheira
Jay Chapman
Sami Guediri
Joevin Jones
Kelvin Leerdam
Blaise Matuidi
John McCarthy
Josh Penn
Patrick Seagrist
Ryan Shawcross
Brek Shea

=== Minnesota United FC ===
Exposed
Fanendo Adi
Juan Agudelo
Osvaldo Alonso
Noah Billingsley
Thomás Chacón
Ethan Finlay
Ján Greguš
Niko Hansen
Brent Kallman
Nabilai Kibunguchy
Justin McMaster
Romain Métanire
Callum Montgomery
Jukka Raitala
Joseph Rosales
DJ Taylor
Adrian Zendejas

=== CF Montréal ===
Exposed
Sebastian Breza
Rudy Camacho
Bjørn Johnsen
Mustafa Kizza
Ismaël Koné
Emanuel Maciel
Aljaž Struna
Ballou Tabla
Róbert Thorkelsson
Victor Wanyama

=== New England Revolution ===
Exposed
Emmanuel Boateng
Luis Caicedo
Scott Caldwell
A. J. DeLaGarza
Earl Edwards Jr.
Wilfrid Kaptoum
Edward Kizza
Brad Knighton
Christian Mafla
Arnor Traustason
Collin Verfurth

=== New York City FC ===
Exposed
Malte Amundsen
Vuk Latinovich
Jesús Medina
Alexandru Mitriță
Cody Mizell
Maximiliano Moralez
Tony Rocha
Ismael Tajouri-Shradi
Guðmundur Þórarinsson
Anton Tinnerholm
Juan Pablo Torres
Gedion Zelalem

=== Philadelphia Union ===
Exposed
Matheus Davó
Joe Bendik
Jesús Bueno
Cory Burke
Aurelien Collin
Stuart Findlay
Ilsinho
Matej Oravec
Gino Portella
Alvas Powell

=== Portland Timbers ===
Exposed
Jeff Attinella
Pablo Bonilla
Steve Clark
George Fochive
Jorge Gonzalez
Aljaž Ivačič
Ismaila Jome
Larrys Mabiala
Zac McGraw
Manny Perez
Andy Polo
Diego Valeri
Josecarlos Van Rankin
Renzo Zambrano

=== Real Salt Lake ===
Exposed
Toni Datković
Everton Luiz
Douglas Martínez
Justin Meram
Ashtone Morgan
Justin Portillo
Noah Powder
Andrew Putna
Jeizon Ramírez
Donny Toia

=== Seattle Sounders FC ===
Exposed
Nicolas Benezet
Will Bruin
Abdoulaye Cissoko
Stefan Cleveland
Jordy Delem
Fredy Montero
Shane O'Neill
Spencer Richey
Kelyn Rowe
Brad Smith
Andrew Thomas

=== Sporting Kansas City ===
Exposed
Amadou Dia
Luís Martins
Roberto Punčec
Ilie Sánchez
Graham Smith

=== Toronto FC ===
Exposed
Nick DeLeon
Dom Dwyer
Tsubasa Endoh
Omar Gonzalez
Kemar Lawrence
Patrick Mullins
Kevin Silva
Eriq Zavaleta

=== Vancouver Whitecaps FC ===
Exposed
Bruno Gaspar
Derek Cornelius
David Egbo
Janio Bikel
Marcus Godinho
Érik Godoy
Florian Jungwirth
Jasser Khmiri
Evan Newton
Leonard Owusu
Tosaint Ricketts
Andy Rose
Russell Teibert
