= Alan Franco (footballer, born 1998) =

Ecuadorian footballer (born 1998)

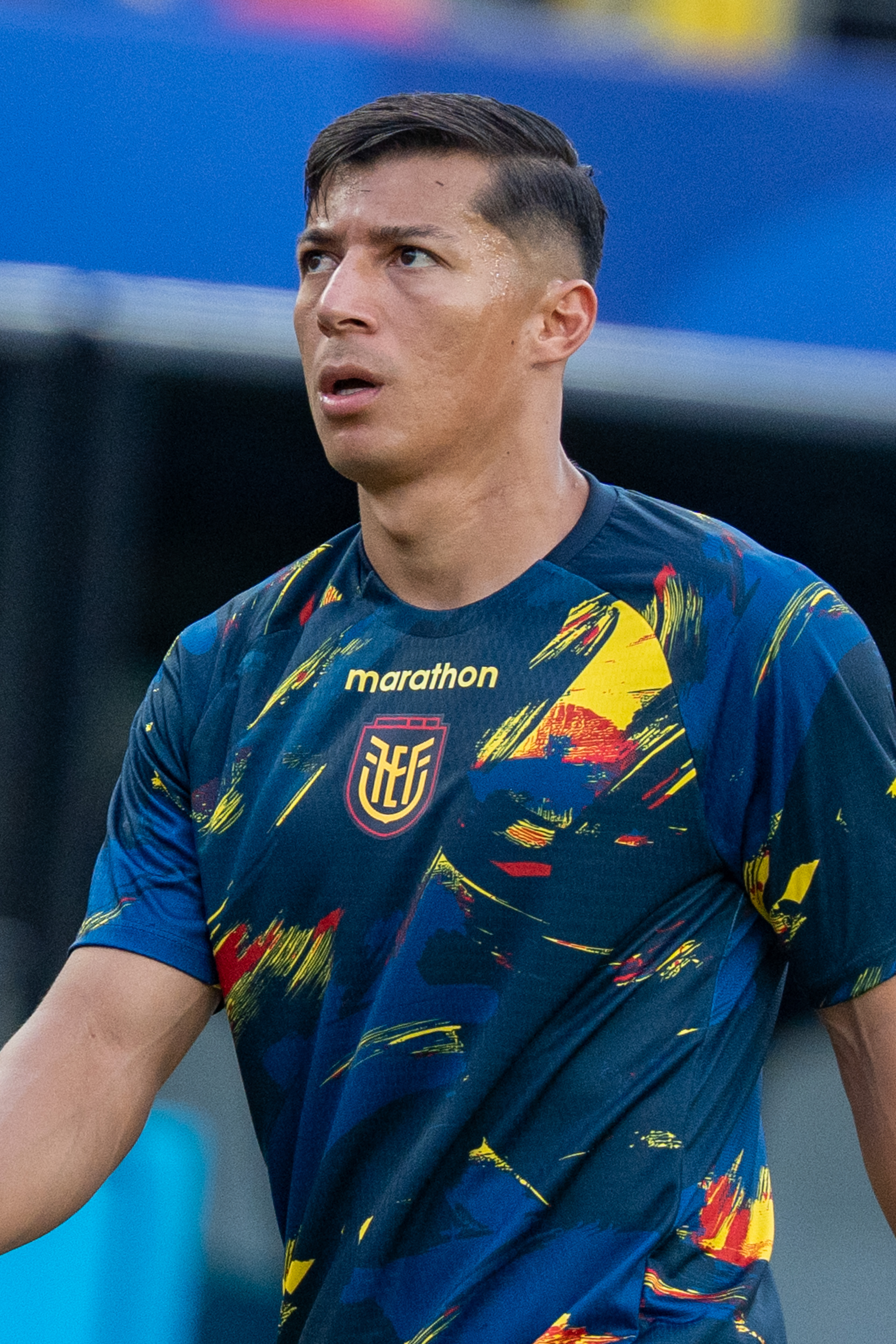
- Franco with Ecuador in 2026

Personal information
- Full name: Alan Steven Franco Palma
- Date of birth: 21 August 1998 (age 28)
- Place of birth: Jujan, Ecuador
- Height: 1.75 m (5 ft 9 in)
- Position: Midfielder

Team information
- Current team: Atlético Mineiro
- Number: 21

Youth career
- –2011: Venecia
- 2011–2014: Norte América
- 2014–2017: Independiente del Valle

Senior career*
Years	Team	Apps	(Gls)
2016–2020	Independiente del Valle	62	(3)
2020–	Atlético Mineiro	158	(4)
2022	→ Charlotte FC (loan)	10	(0)
2022–2023	→ Talleres (loan)	34	(0)

International career^{‡}
2015	Ecuador U17	5	(0)
2020	Ecuador U23	4	(0)
2018–	Ecuador	64	(1)
- * Club domestic league appearances and goals as of 12 September 2026 ‡ National team caps and goals as of 1 October 2026

Alan Steven Franco Palma (born 21 August 1998) is an Ecuadorian professional footballer who plays as a midfielder for Campeonato Brasileiro Série A club Atlético Mineiro and the Ecuador national team.

== Club career ==
=== Independiente del Valle ===
Franco came through the youth setup at Independiente del Valle and made his professional debut as an 18-year-old in 2016. He was a first team regular by 2018 and was one of the standout performers of Independiente del Valle's winning campaign in the 2019 Copa Sudamericana, in which he and defender Luis Segovia were the only players to start every game.

=== Atlético Mineiro ===
On 4 June 2020, Franco moved to Brazilian club Atlético Mineiro.

==== Loans to Charlotte FC and Talleres ====
On 21 December 2021, Atlético Mineiro agreed to send Franco to Major League Soccer expansion club Charlotte FC on a one-year loan deal with an option to buy. On 27 June 2022, Franco's loan with Charlotte transferred to Argentinian side Talleres de Córdoba.

== International career ==
In August 2018, Franco was called up to the Ecuador national team for the first time by manager Hernán Darío Gómez. He made his debut on 12 September 2018, in a friendly against Guatemala.

Franco was selected in the 28-player Ecuador squad for the 2021 Copa América.

Franco was named in the Ecuadorian squad for the 2022 FIFA World Cup.

Franco was called up to the final 26-man Ecuador squad for the 2024 Copa América.

On 31 May 2026, Franco was selected in the 26-man squad for the 2026 FIFA World Cup.

== Career statistics ==
=== Club ===
As of 12 September 2026

Appearances and goals by club, season and competition
Club	Season	League			Cup		Continental		Other		Total	
Club	Season	Division	Apps	Goals	Apps	Goals	Apps	Goals	Apps	Goals	Apps	Goals
Independiente del Valle	2016	Serie A	2	0	—		0	0	—		2	0
Independiente del Valle	2017	Serie A	1	0	—		0	0	—		1	0
Independiente del Valle	2018	Serie A	33	3	—		0	0	—		33	3
Independiente del Valle	2019	Serie A	26	0	0	0	11 (Note: Appearance(s) in Copa Sudamericana)	2	—		37	2
Independiente del Valle	2020	Serie A	0	0	—		0	0	2 (Note: Appearance(s) in Recopa Sudamericana)	0	2	0
Independiente del Valle	Total		62	3	0	0	11	2	2	0	75	5
Atlético Mineiro	2020	Série A	28	3	—		—		5 (Note: Appearance(s) in Campeonato Mineiro)	0	33	3
Atlético Mineiro	2021	Série A	5	0	1	0	4 (Note: Appearance(s) in Copa Libertadores)	0	5	0	15	0
Atlético Mineiro	2023	Série A	18	0	—		0	0	—		18	0
Atlético Mineiro	2024	Série A	22	0	10	0	12	0	7	0	51	0
Atlético Mineiro	2025	Série A	30	1	7	0	10	0	9	0	56	1
Atlético Mineiro	2026	Série A	20	0	5	0	8	0	10 (Note: Appearances in Campeonato Paulista)	0	43	0
Atlético Mineiro	Total		123	4	23	0	34	0	36	0	216	4
Charlotte FC (loan)	2022	MLS	10	0	1	0	—		—		11	0
Talleres (loan)	2022	AFA Liga Profesional de Fútbol	15	0	3	0	4	1	—		22	1
Talleres (loan)	2023	AFA Liga Profesional de Fútbol	19	0	1	0	—		—		20	0
Talleres (loan)	Total		34	0	4	0	4	1	0	0	42	1
Career total			229	7	28	0	49	3	36	0	344	10

=== International ===
As of match played 1 October 2026

Appearances and goals by national team and year
National team	Year	Apps	Goals
Ecuador
Ecuador	2018	3	0
Ecuador	2019	2	1
Ecuador	2020	3	0
Ecuador	2021	10	0
Ecuador	2022	9	0
Ecuador	2023	5	0
Ecuador	2024	14	0
Ecuador	2025	9	0
Ecuador	2026	9	0
Total		64	1

Scores and results list Ecuador's goal tally first, score column indicates score after each Franco goal.

List of international goals scored by Alan Franco
No.	Date	Venue	Opponent	Score	Result	Competition
1	14 November 2019	Estadio Reales Tamarindos, Portoviejo, Ecuador	Trinidad and Tobago	1–0	3–0	Friendly

== Honours ==
Independiente del Valle

- Copa Sudamericana: 2019

Atlético Mineiro

- Campeonato Brasileiro Série A: 2021
- Copa do Brasil: 2021
- Campeonato Mineiro: 2020, 2021, 2024, 2025

Individual

- Campeonato Mineiro Team of the Year: 2025
