= Christian Ortiz =

Argentine footballer

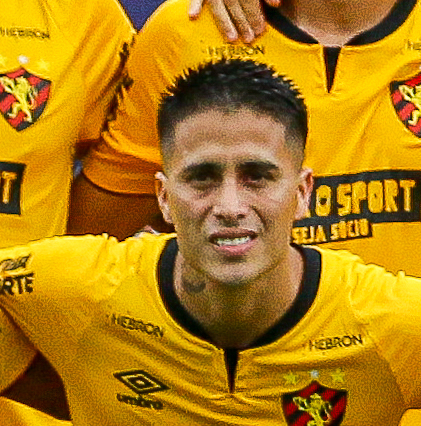
- Ortiz in 2025

Personal information
- Full name: Christian Jonatan Ortiz
- Date of birth: 20 August 1992 (age 34)
- Place of birth: Rosario, Argentina
- Height: 1.69 m (5 ft 6 1/2 in)
- Position: Winger

Team information
- Current team: Grêmio Novorizontino
- Number: 8

Senior career*
Years	Team	Apps	(Gls)
2008	Arroyo Seco	10	(0)
2008–2010	Huracán	0	(0)
2010–2012	Racing-URU	37	(6)
2012–2018	Independiente	2	(0)
2016	→ Universidad San Martín (loan)	40	(20)
2017	→ Sporting Cristal (loan)	39	(11)
2018	Universidad-SM	18	(7)
2019–2020	Cristal	26	(5)
2020–2021	IDV	32	(12)
2021–2023	Tijuana	17	(0)
2022	→ Charlotte (loan)	15	(1)
2022	→ Defensa y Justicia (loan)	7	(0)
2023	→ Barcelona-EQU (loan)	25	(1)
2024–2025	Recife	43	(4)
2025	América Mineiro	12	(0)
2026–	Novorizontino	20	(1)
- * Club domestic league appearances and goals as of 17 November 2026

Christian Jonatan Ortiz (born 20 August 1992) is an Argentine professional footballer who plays as a winger for Grêmio Novorizontino.

== Career ==
Ortiz's career began in 2008 with Real Arroyo Seco in Torneo Argentino A, he featured ten times for the club. In 2008, Ortiz joined Huracán of the Argentine Primera División. Two years later, after no games for Huracán, Ortiz left to join Uruguayan Primera División team Racing Club. He made his professional debut on 5 September 2010 in a defeat to Liverpool, prior to scoring his first senior goal two weeks later against River Plate. He spent two seasons with Racing Club, scoring six goals in thirty-seven appearances. In July 2012, Ortiz returned to Argentine football to sign for Avellaneda's Independiente.

His Independiente debut arrived on 28 November versus Belgrano. After just two further appearances in the next four years, Ortiz joined Peruvian Primera División side Universidad San Martín on loan for the 2016 season. He went on to score twenty times, including one brace against Alianza Atlético on 18 September 2016, in forty appearances for the club. On 24 January 2017, Ortiz returned to Peru to play for Sporting Cristal on loan. He scored in his first match, netting a late consolation against Sport Rosario on 25 February. Ten more goals followed in forty-five games in all competitions for them.

Former club Universidad San Martín resigned Ortiz permanently in July 2018, seven months before he completed a return to another previous team: Sporting Cristal. He made his bow on 24 February versus Alianza Lima, prior to scoring twice on his Copa Sudamericana debut against Unión Española in May.

== Career statistics ==
As of 22 May 2019.

Club statistics
Club	Season	League			Cup		Continental		Other		Total	
Club	Season	Division	Apps	Goals	Apps	Goals	Apps	Goals	Apps	Goals	Apps	Goals
Real Arroyo Seco	2008–09	Torneo Argentino A	10	0	0	0	—		0	0	10	0
Huracán	2008–09	Argentine Primera División	0	0	0	0	—		0	0	0	0
Huracán	2009–10	Argentine Primera División	0	0	0	0	—		0	0	0	0
Huracán	Total		0	0	0	0	—		0	0	0	0
Racing Club	2010–11	Uruguayan Primera División	11	2	—		—		0	0	11	2
Racing Club	2011–12	Uruguayan Primera División	26	4	—		—		0	0	26	4
Racing Club	Total		37	6	—		—		0	0	37	6
Independiente	2012–13	Argentine Primera División	1	0	0	0	0	0	0	0	1	0
Independiente	2013–14	Primera B Nacional	1	0	0	0	—		0	0	1	0
Independiente	2014	Argentine Primera División	0	0	0	0	—		0	0	0	0
Independiente	2015	Argentine Primera División	0	0	1	1	0	0	0	0	1	1
Independiente	2016	Argentine Primera División	0	0	0	0	—		0	0	0	0
Independiente	2016–17	Argentine Primera División	0	0	0	0	0	0	0	0	0	0
Independiente	2017–18	Argentine Primera División	0	0	0	0	0	0	0	0	0	0
Independiente	Total		2	0	1	1	0	0	0	0	3	1
Universidad San Martín (loan)	2016	Peruvian Primera División	40	20	—		—		0	0	40	20
Sporting Cristal (loan)	2017	Peruvian Primera División	39	11	—		6 (Note: Appearance(s) in the Copa Libertadores)	0	0	0	45	11
Universidad San Martín	2018	Peruvian Primera División	18	7	—		—		0	0	18	7
Sporting Cristal	2019	Peruvian Primera División	10	4	—		5 (Note: Appearance(s) in the Copa Libertadores and Copa Sudamericana)	2	0	0	15	6
Career total			156	48	1	1	11	2	0	0	168	51
