= McKinze Gaines =

American soccer player

Personal information
- Full name: Orrin McKinze Gaines II
- Date of birth: March 2, 1998 (age 28)
- Place of birth: Austin, Texas, United States
- Height: 6 ft 0 in (1.82 m)
- Position: Winger

Youth career
- 2012–2016: Lonestar SC
- 2016–2017: VfL Wolfsburg

Senior career*
Years	Team	Apps	(Gls)
2017–2019	Darmstadt 98	2	(0)
2019	→ FSV Zwickau (loan)	9	(0)
2019–2020	Sonnenhof Großaspach	24	(3)
2020–2021	Hannover 96 II	9	(1)
2021	Hannover 96	1	(0)
2021	Austin FC	9	(1)
2022–2023	Charlotte FC	43	(2)
2023	Crown Legacy FC	1	(0)
2024	Nashville SC	4	(0)
2024	Houston Dynamo	11	(0)
2024	Houston Dynamo 2	1	(0)
2025	New Mexico United	14	(2)
2025	Las Vegas Lights	8	(0)

International career
2014–2015	United States U17	30	(5)
2016	United States U19	2	(0)
- * Club domestic league appearances and goals as of October 28, 2025

Orrin McKinze Gaines II (born March 2, 1998) is an American professional soccer player who plays as a winger.

== Career ==
Gaines grew up in the Austin area where he played youth soccer for Lonestar Soccer Club. On August 12, 2017, Gaines made his professional debut against Jahn Regensburg in the DFB-Pokal.

On July 8, 2019, Gaines signed with Sonnenhof Großaspach.

Gaines joined Hannover 96 ahead of the 2020–21 season, starting with the team's reserve squad. He made his debut for the first team against SC Paderborn in the 2. Bundesliga. He left the club ahead of the 2021–22 season.

=== Austin FC ===
On July 14, 2021, Gaines began trialing with Major League Soccer club Austin FC, coming on as a substitute in the club's friendly against Tigres UANL. A couple weeks later, on July 30, Gaines officially joined Austin FC.

=== Charlotte FC ===
On December 14, 2021, Gaines was selected by Charlotte FC in the 2021 MLS Expansion Draft. He was released by Charlotte following their 2023 season.

=== Nashville SC ===
On December 14, 2023, Gaines' rights were traded to Nashville SC in exchange for their second round 2024 MLS SuperDraft pick.

=== Houston Dynamo ===
Gaines was again traded in 2024, moving to Houston Dynamo on April 23, 2024, in exchange for $75,000 in General Allocation Money. On November 7, 2024, his contract expired with Houston following their 2024 season.

=== New Mexico United ===
On January 27, 2025 New Mexico United announced they had signed Gaines for the 2025 USL Championship season.

=== Las Vegas Lights ===
McKinze was transferred to USL Championship side Las Vegas Lights in exchange for an international player slot. He was released by Las Vegas following their 2025 season.

== Career statistics ==
As of match played August 26, 2021

Appearances and goals by club, season and competition
Club	Season	League			National cup		Continental		Total	
Club	Season	Division	Apps	Goals	Apps	Goals	Apps	Goals	Apps	Goals
Darmstadt 98	2017–18	2. Bundesliga	2	0	1	0	—		3	0
Darmstadt 98	2018–19	2. Bundesliga	0	0	0	0	—		0	0
Darmstadt 98	Total		2	0	1	0	0	0	3	0
FSV Zwickau (loan)	2018–19	3. Liga	9	0	0	0	—		9	0
Sonnenhof Großaspach	2019–20	3. Liga	24	3	0	0	—		24	3
Hannover 96 II	2020–21	Regionalliga	9	1	—		—		9	1
Hannover 96	2020–21	2. Bundesliga	1	0	0	0	—		1	0
Hannover 96	Total		43	4	0	0	0	0	43	4
Austin FC	2021	Major League Soccer	9	1	—		—		9	1
Charlotte FC	2022	Major League Soccer	24	1	3	2	—		27	3
Charlotte FC	2023	Major League Soccer	7	0	1	0	—		8	0
Charlotte FC	Total		40	2	4	2	0	0	44	4
Career total			85	6	5	2	0	0	90	8
