= Guzmán Corujo =

Uruguayan football player (born 1996)

Personal information
- Full name: Guzmán Corujo Bríccola
- Date of birth: 2 August 1996 (age 30)
- Place of birth: Rodríguez, Uruguay
- Height: 1.89 m (6 ft 2 in)
- Position: Centre-back

Team information
- Current team: San Lorenzo
- Number: 16

Youth career
- Nacional

Senior career*
Years	Team	Apps	(Gls)
2017–2021	Nacional	75	(1)
2022–2023	Charlotte FC	31	(1)
2023	Crown Legacy FC	1	(0)
2024	Čukarički	0	(0)
2025–2026	Deportivo Cali	20	(0)
2026–	San Lorenzo	12	(1)
- * Club domestic league appearances and goals as of 17:57, 21 November 2026 (UTC)

Guzmán Corujo Bríccola (born 2 August 1996) is a Uruguayan professional footballer who plays as a centre-back for Argentine club San Lorenzo.

== Career ==
Nacional signed Corujo in 2017.

Charlotte FC signed Corujo on 30 August 2021.

Corujo transferred to Serbian club FK Čukarički on 13 February 2024.

== Career statistics ==
As of 10 October 2022

Appearances and goals by club, season and competition
Club	Season	League			Cup		Continental		Other		Total	
Club	Season	Division	Apps	Goals	Apps	Goals	Apps	Goals	Apps	Goals	Apps	Goals
Nacional	2017	Uruguayan Primera División	3	0	—		0	0	0	0	3	0
Nacional	2018	Uruguayan Primera División	10	0	—		9 (Note: Appearances in Copa Libertadores.)	1	1 (Note: Appearance in Supercopa Uruguaya.)	0	20	1
Nacional	2019	Uruguayan Primera División	26	0	—		5	0	2 (Note: One appearance each in Torneo Clausura decider and championship play-off.)	1	33	1
Nacional	2020	Uruguayan Primera División	23	0	—		3	0	5 (Note: Two appearances in championship play-off, one appearance each in Torneo Apertura decider, Torneo Intermedio final and Supercopa Uruguaya.)	0	31	0
Nacional	2021	Uruguayan Primera División	13	1	—		7 (Note: Five appearances in Copa Libertadores, two appearances and one goal in Copa Sudamericana.)	1	1	0	21	2
Nacional	Total		75	1	0	0	24	2	9	1	108	4
Charlotte FC	2022	MLS	25	1	1	0	—		—		26	1
Career total			100	2	0	0	24	2	9	1	134	5

== Honours ==
Nacional

- Uruguayan Primera División: 2019, 2020
- Supercopa Uruguaya: 2021
