= Adam Armour (soccer) =

American soccer player

Personal information
- Full name: Adam Edouard Armour
- Date of birth: September 27, 2002 (age 24)
- Place of birth: Burlington, North Carolina, United States
- Height: 5 ft 10 in (1.78 m)
- Position: Defender

Youth career
- North Carolina FC Youth

Senior career*
Years	Team	Apps	(Gls)
2020–2021	1. FC Nürnberg	0	(0)
2021–2023	Charlotte FC	5	(1)
2021	→ Charlotte Independence (loan)	19	(0)
2023	Crown Legacy FC	4	(0)
2023	FC Tulsa	12	(0)
2025	Eintracht Nordhorn	11	(0)
2026	Portland Hearts of Pine	3	(0)

International career
2018–2019	United States U17	19	(0)
- * Club domestic league appearances and goals as of March 29, 2026

Adam Edouard Armour (born September 27, 2002) is an American professional soccer player who most recently played for USL League One team Portland Hearts of Pine.

== Career ==
=== Youth ===
Armour played for Capital Area Soccer League at the U-9 and U-13 levels. That club became North Carolina FC Youth, where he played at the U-14 level. He signed an academy contract with North Carolina FC of the USL Championship on April 4, 2019. He made his debut for North Carolina FC in a friendly against Club Necaxa on March 23, 2019. He signed a second academy contract with North Carolina FC on January 17, 2020.

=== Professional ===
On July 2, 2020, Armour signed with 1. FC Nürnberg in the German 2. Bundesliga. The following summer, on June 29, 2021, Armour signed with Charlotte FC of MLS.

On July 17, 2021, Armour moved on loan to USL Championship side Charlotte Independence for the remainder of their 2021 season.

On March 13, 2022, Armour scored the first goal in Charlotte FC's history in the 66th minute against Atlanta United.

On April 20, 2022, Armour tore the lateral and medial meniscus in his left knee. This was after discovering weeks earlier that he had no functioning anterior cruciate ligament in his left knee. His knee was surgically repaired, after which Armor went into a year-long rehab.

Armour was waived by Charlotte on April 27, 2023. He subsequently joined USL Championship side FC Tulsa for the remainder of the 2023 season. On July 31, 2023 Armour suffered a season ending injury to his knee.

He spent the entirety of 2024 without a club before joining Eintracht Nordhorn in Landesliga Weser-Ems, the sixth tier of German professional football, in February 2025. He helped Nordhorn achieve promotion from the Landesliga Weser-Ems during his time there, appearing in 11 matches.

On February 20, 2026, Armour signed for USL League One side Portland Hearts of Pine on a performance-based contract. He made his debut for the club on March 15, 2026, coming on as a substitute in a 3−1 win over New York Cosmos. He departed the club per the terms of his performance-based contract on April 18, 2026, after appearing in four matches across all competitions and following the signing of Josh Drack from Westchester SC.

== International ==
Armour was called up to the United States men's national under-17 soccer team in April 2018 and made his international debut in a game against India. He played a total of 19 games with the team, including in the 2019 FIFA U-17 World Cup.
