= Koa Santos =

American soccer player (born 1999)

Personal information
- Full name: Laukoa Santos
- Date of birth: 21 September 1999 (age 27)
- Place of birth: Waikoloa, Hawaii, United States
- Height: 1.78 m (5 ft 10 in)
- Position: Right-back

Youth career
- Kona Crush
- 2013–2017: Kealakehe High School

College career
Years	Team	Apps	(Gls)
2017–2021	San Diego State Aztecs	58	(2)

Senior career*
Years	Team	Apps	(Gls)
2018	ASC San Diego	2	(0)
2021	Portland Timbers U23s	10	(2)
2022–2023	Charlotte FC	1	(0)
2022–2023	→ Charlotte Independence (loan)	19	(1)
2023	Loudoun United	25	(0)
2024–2025	Colorado Springs Swtichbacks	28	(0)
2025	Orange County SC	11	(0)
- * Club domestic league appearances and goals

Laukoa Santos (born September 21, 1999) is an American former soccer player who played as a Right-back.

== Career ==
=== Youth ===
Santos played academy soccer for his local soccer club Kona Crush Academy. Concurrently, Laukoa played high school soccer for Kealakehe High School in Kona, Hawaii. With Kealakehe, Laukoa served as the team's captain, being named Three-time Big Island Interscholastic Federation Player of the Year, Four-time Big Island Interscholastic, First-team all-state honoree (2016–17), and All-Hawaii team (2016–17). During his career with Kealakehe High School Santos recorded 87 goals and 48 assists during his prep career.

=== College ===
Ahead of the 2017 NCAA Division I men's soccer season, Laukoa signed a National Letter of Intent to play collegiately for San Diego State University. Laukoa is the first men's soccer player from state of Hawaii to play in the Pac-12. Laukoa would go on to red shirt his first season at San Diego and make his official debut during the 2018 season. On September 24, 2018, Laukoa scored his first collegiate goal against UNLV. Laukoa would finish his collegiate career with 58 appearances, scoring two goals and tallying three assists.. Santos was named to the Pac-12 Academic Honor Roll on three consecutive seasons from 2019 to 2021.

=== Amateur ===
While at college, Santos appeared in the National Premier Soccer League with ASC San Diego during their 2018 season, making two regular season appearances. In 2021, Santos played with USL League Two Portland Timbers U23s, scoring two goals in ten appearances.

=== Professional ===
On February 22, 2022, Santos signed with Major League Soccer club Charlotte FC ahead of their inaugural season. On April 17, 2022, Santos was loaned to USL League One club Charlotte Independence and started for the team the same day in a 2–1 win over Northern Colorado Hailstorm.

Santos joined Colorado Springs Switchbacks FC on November 29, 2023.

On April 25, 2025, Santos made the move to fellow USL Championship side Orange County SC.

== Honors ==
- First men's soccer player from state of Hawaii to play in the Pac-12
- Three-time Big Island Interscholastic Federation Player of the Year
- Four-time Big Island Interscholastic Federation first-team selection
- First-team all-state honoree (2016–17)
- All-Hawaii team (2016–17)
- Pac-12 All Academic (2017–21)
- Led Portland Timbers U23 to a Western Conference Title (2021)
