= Jan Sobociński =

Polish association football player

Personal information
- Full name: Jan Andrzej Sobociński
- Date of birth: 20 March 1999 (age 27)
- Place of birth: Łódź, Poland
- Height: 1.86 m (6 ft 1 in)
- Position: Centre-back

Team information
- Current team: Rekord Bielsko-Biała
- Number: 3

Youth career
- –2018: ŁKS Łódź

Senior career*
Years	Team	Apps	(Gls)
2018–2021	ŁKS Łódź	80	(4)
2018	→ Gryf Wejherowo (loan)	13	(1)
2021–2023	Charlotte FC	22	(0)
2021	→ ŁKS Łódź (loan)	9	(1)
2023	Crown Legacy FC	3	(0)
2024–2025	PAS Giannina	21	(2)
2025–	Rekord Bielsko-Biała	22	(1)

International career
2018–2019	Poland U20	8	(0)
2019	Poland U21	5	(0)
- * Club domestic league appearances and goals as of 11:14, 31 May 2026 (UTC)

Jan Andrzej Sobociński (born 20 March 1999) is a Polish professional footballer who plays as a centre-back for II liga club Rekord Bielsko-Biała.

== Career ==
On 16 February 2021, Major League Soccer expansion side Charlotte FC announced Sobociński would join the club ahead of the 2022 season. In July, he officially joined the American team and was loaned back to ŁKS Łódź for the rest of 2021. He was released by Charlotte following their 2023 season.

On 30 January 2024, Sobociński joined Greek side PAS Giannina until the end of the season. He scored on his debut in a 4–2 league loss against AEK Athens on 28 February. Despite PAS Giannina's relegation to Super League Greece 2, Sobociński extended his deal for another year and was named captain for the 2024–25 season. On 27 March 2025, he unilaterally terminated his contract due to non-payments.

On 12 September 2025, Sobociński returned to Poland to join third-tier club Rekord Bielsko-Biała on a season-long deal, with an option to extend.

== Career statistics ==
As of match played 30 May 2026

Appearances and goals by club, season and competition
Club	Season	League			National cup (Note: Includes Polish Cup, U.S. Open Cup, Greek Cup)		Continental		Other		Total	
Club	Season	Division	Apps	Goals	Apps	Goals	Apps	Goals	Apps	Goals	Apps	Goals
Gryf Wejherowo (loan)	2017–18	II liga	13	1	0	0	—		—		13	1
ŁKS Łódź	2018–19	I liga	30	2	0	0	—		—		30	2
ŁKS Łódź	2019–20	Ekstraklasa	27	2	1	0	—		—		28	2
ŁKS Łódź	2020–21	I liga	23	0	3	1	—		—		26	1
ŁKS Łódź (loan)	2021–22	I liga	9	1	1	0	—		—		10	1
ŁKS Łódź (loan)	Total		89	5	5	1	—		—		94	6
Charlotte FC	2022	Major League Soccer	9	0	2	0	—		—		11	0
Charlotte FC	2023	Major League Soccer	13	0	3	0	—		1 (Note: Appearance in Leagues Cup)	0	17	0
Charlotte FC	Total		22	0	5	0	—		1	0	28	0
Crown Legacy FC	2023	MLS Next Pro	3	0	—		—		—		3	0
PAS Giannina	2023–24	Super League Greece	6	1	—		—		—		6	1
PAS Giannina	2024–25	Super League Greece 2	15	1	3	0	—		—		18	1
PAS Giannina	Total		21	2	3	0	—		—		24	2
Rekord Bielsko-Biała	2025–26	II liga	22	1	—		—		—		22	1
Career total			170	9	13	1	—		1	0	184	10
