= Quinn McNeill =

Irish footballer

Personal information
- Date of birth: 30 August 1998 (age 28)
- Place of birth: Cork, Ireland
- Height: 1.80 m (5 ft 11 in)
- Position: Midfielder

Youth career
- 2011–2017: CESA

College career
Years	Team	Apps	(Gls)
2017–2021	Clemson Tigers	77	(9)

Senior career*
Years	Team	Apps	(Gls)
2018–2019	Greenville FC	15	(1)
2022	Charlotte FC	11	(1)
2022	→ Charlotte Independence (loan)	13	(1)
Total		39	(3)
- * Club domestic league appearances and goals

Quinn McNeill (born 30 August 1998) is an Irish former footballer who played as a midfielder.

== Career ==
=== Youth, College & Amateur ===
McNeill was born in Cork, Ireland, but grew up in Greenville, South Carolina. He attended J. L. Mann High School, also playing club soccer with the Carolina Elite Soccer Academy (CESA), where he was a five-time South Carolina State Champion.

In 2017, McNeill attended Clemson University to play college soccer. He redshirted his freshman season in 2017, but went on to make 77 appearances for the Tigers, scoring nine goals and tallying five assists, also helping the team to winning the NCAA National Championship in 2021.

While at college, McNeill also played in the NPSL with Greenville FC during their 2018 and 2019 seasons.

=== Professional ===
On 5 April 2022, McNeill signed with Major League Soccer club Charlotte FC on a one-year deal. He was immediately loaned to Charlotte Independence in the USL League One for the 2022 season. He made his professional league debut on 8 April, starting in a 3–3 draw with Central Valley Fuego FC.
