= 2011 New York Red Bulls season =

New York Red Bulls
2011 season
- General manager: Erik Solér
- Head coach: Hans Backe
- Stadium: Red Bull Arena
- MLS: 10th
- Playoffs: Conference Semi-finals
- U.S. Open Cup: Quarterfinals
- Top goalscorer: League: Thierry Henry (14); All: Thierry Henry (15)
- Highest home attendance: 25,186 v Los Angeles; October 4, 2011
- Lowest home attendance: 13,664 v Houston; April 2, 2011
- Average home league attendance: 19,691

The 2011 New York Red Bulls season was the club's seventeenth year of existence, as well as its sixteenth season in Major League Soccer, the top-flight of American soccer.

After a successful turnaround season in 2010, in which Red Bulls finished in third place overall before losing in the quarterfinals of the post-season tournament, the club started 2011 hoping to find consistency, make a deeper run in the MLS Cup Playoffs, and vie for the Supporters Shield. By season's end it was clear the club failed on all three fronts. Red Bulls were labeled the biggest underachievers in MLS after performing with a maddening inconsistency, struggling even to earn the 10th and final spot in an expanded playoff field, and falling again in the playoff quarterfinals.

Prior to the 2011 MLS season, New York Red Bulls manager Hans Backe declared that the club's goal for the season was to win the Shield, claiming that it was more of a test for the league title rather than the MLS Cup, which he called a crapshoot. As this goal drifted out of reach, Backe backtracked from his Supporters' Shield emphasis and remarkably blamed international call-ups due to the 2011 CONCACAF Gold Cup as the reason the Shield was unobtainable. New York ended the season 21 points shy of the Shield. At the conclusion of the season, Backe acknowledged that he didn't know the biennial CONCACAF tournament was being held in 2011. That lack of awareness seemed to haunt the club throughout the season, both on field and off. The average MLS regular season and playoff home attendance of the New York Red Bulls in 2011 was 20,000.

== Team uniform ==
Home	Home Alternate	Away	Emirates Cup

== Month-by-Month Overview ==
=== November 2010 ===
On November 4, due to the 2010 season ending with a disappointing home playoff loss to San Jose Earthquakes, the roster changes began immediately. The playoff loss marked the end of the careers for defender Mike Petke and midfielder Seth Stammler, each of whom had announced his retirement upon completion of the season. Petke joined the Red Bulls front office in January; Stammler pursued an MBA degree at the University of Chicago.

On November 22, the Red Bulls traded midfielder/defender Jeremy Hall to the expansion Portland Timbers in exchange for a third-round pick in the 2011 MLS SuperDraft. Two days later the 2010 MLS Expansion Draft was held but neither Portland nor fellow expansion side Vancouver Whitecaps selected an available Red Bulls player.

The coaching staff saw assistant Coach Goran Aral leave the club after one season.

Internationally, forward Juan Agudelo and defender Tim Ream each earned their first senior caps with the U.S. National Team on November 17. Playing in Cape Town against South Africa, Ream started and played 67 minutes while Agudelo came on as a 60th-minute substitute. Agudelo then scored the game's only goal in the 85th minute, winning the match and becoming the youngest scorer in U.S. Men's Team history at 17 years, 359 days. Agudelo bested the mark previously held by Jozy Altidore, who also set the mark while a member of New York Red Bulls.

=== December 2010 ===
The departure of captain Juan Pablo Ángel was made official when Red Bulls declined his 2011 contract option and he opted to participate in the inaugural MLS Re-Entry Draft. Midfielder Luke Sassano and defender Carey Talley also elected to participate in the Re-Entry draft when their 2011 contract options were declined. On December 15, Los Angeles Galaxy traded up in the draft order to select Ángel. On January 19 the sides agreed terms on a multi-year, Designated Player contract.

Sassano was also selected by Los Angeles Galaxy in the Re-Entry Draft but his rights were traded to Sporting Kansas City later that same day. He signed with Sporting KC on January 12, 2011. Talley was not selected and subsequently announced his retirement on January 19, 2011. Red Bulls did not select any players in the Re-Entry draft.

On December 17, the club announced a trade with Houston Dynamo in which Red Bulls received an undisclosed amount of allocation money. In return, Houston received New York's natural third-round selection in the 2012 MLS SuperDraft and the rights to defender Hunter Freeman, whom Houston immediately signed. Red Bulls had traded Freeman to Toronto FC for the last months of the 2008 MLS season even though Freeman had already agreed a pre-contract with IK Start of the Norwegian Premier League. The trade with Toronto included a provision that Red Bulls retain Freeman's MLS rights should he return to the league.

In international duty, midfielder Dane Richards scored three goals over five games to help Jamaica win the 2010 Caribbean Cup.

=== January 2011 ===
The club was active in January 2011 with a number of players coming and going. The long-rumored acquisitions of Norwegian midfielder Jan Gunnar Solli and English forward Luke Rodgers were finalized on January 26 and 28, respectively. The club also signed young Brazilian midfielder Marcos Paullo, who had trialed with New York in 2010, on January 30.

Red Bulls announced the signing of two more Homegrown players from Red Bull Academy in January: midfielder Matt Kassel and defender Šaćir Hot. Kassel and Hot joined prior Academy signings Juan Agudelo and Giorgi Chirgadze on the Red Bulls roster.

At the January 13 2011 SuperDraft, the club selected Generation adidas forward Corey Hertzog in round one, English midfielder John Rooney (brother of English international Wayne Rooney) and defender Tyler Lassiter in round two, and defender Billy Cortes in round three. The following week, Red Bulls selected goalkeeper Jimmy Maurer and defender Teddy Schneider in the 2011 Supplemental Draft. Of the draft choices, Hertzog and Rooney were immediately added to the club's roster as both had already signed contracts with Major League Soccer. Lassiter, Cortes, Maurer, and Schneider were not guaranteed contracts and were invited to preseason training camp to earn a spot on the club's final roster.

On January 17, the club announced that Jan Halvor Halvorsen had been hired as assistant coach, replacing Goran Aral.

In the final week of January, the club announced that midfielder Siniša Ubiparipović and defender Andrew Boyens would not be returning to the club in 2011. Boyens signed with Chivas USA in early February.

The club announced its preseason schedule would include training stints in Cancún, Guadalajara, Fort Lauderdale, and Arizona. The list of preseason opponents included Mexico's Chivas, D2 side Miami FC, plus Chicago Fire, Sporting Kansas City, and FC Dallas of MLS.

=== February ===
On February 1, MLS announced that Red Bull Arena would host the 2011 MLS All-Star Game on July 27 when the MLS All-Stars would take on perennial Premier League power Manchester United for the second consecutive season.

On February 9, the preseason schedule kicked off when the Red Bulls defeated Mexican side Atlante F.C. 0–0 (4–3 penalties) in Cancún. Preseason continued with very little to report in roster changes or injuries. The club brought in a few trialists, most notably Teemu Tainio, and late in the month released third-round SuperDraft pick Billy Cortes.

A major shake-up occurred on February 28 when Red Bulls fired longtime assistant coaches Richie Williams and Des McAleenan. Williams was a popular figure among club supporters and guided the club as caretaker manager in two different seasons. His MLS experience had been credited with helping Sporting Director Erik Solér and Head Coach Hans Backe adjust to the peculiarities of the league, such as the MLS SuperDraft. Williams had played the 2001 and 2003 seasons for the club before returning as assistant coach in 2006. McAleenan had been goalkeeping coach since 2002, a remarkable run given the ownership change and constant turnover around him in the coaching and front office ranks.

=== March ===
The club met the March 1 official MLS roster compliance of 30 players by waiving two second-year players, forward Conor Chinn and midfielder Irving Garcia. While neither made an impact during the 2010 regular season, each performed well as part of the "Baby Bulls" squad in the 2010 U.S. Open Cup.

A few injuries did hit the squad as preseason came to an end. Strikers Luke Rodgers and Juan Agudelo battled nagging injuries which limited their participation in exhibition matches. The club announced on March 8 that defender Chris Albright had undergone knee surgery and would miss 4–6 weeks. On March 9, Red Bulls announced the signings of two trialists, midfielder/defender Teemu Tainio and defender Stephen Keel. Tainio was penciled in for a starting role while Keel was signed to provide defensive depth from the bench.

The club released Giorgi Chirgadze, its first ever homegrown player signing, on March 15. Though Chirgadze signed with the club in 2009 he never did appear in a league match with Red Bulls.

The 2011 Major League Soccer season officially kicked off for Red Bulls when the club hosted Seattle Sounders FC on March 19. New York dominated possession 63%-37% and out-shot Seattle 13-8 en route to a 1-0 victory. The lone goal was scored in the 70th minute by Juan Agudelo off a long ball by MLS debutante Teemu Tainio.

Two days later the club announced it had waived forward Salou Ibrahim which was a bit surprising given New York's thin ranks at forward. Ibrahim's release left only four forwards on the roster: Juan Agudelo, Thierry Henry, Luke Rodgers, and Corey Hertzog. Salou spent the 2010 season with Red Bulls, scoring 3 goals in 19 league games (8 starts).

Red Bulls signed second-round SuperDraft choice Tyler Lassiter on March 23. The rookie defender earned much praise from the club in pre-season, with coach Hans Backe stating, "The way he started this preseason, he looks better in February than Tim Ream did when he arrived." Ream went on to be an MLS Rookie of the Year finalist. The club also signed Alex Horwath as the third-string goalkeeper on March 25. Horwath was immediately placed into action on March 26 at Columbus Crew due to an injury to starting goalkeeper Greg Sutton and the international call-up of backup keeper Bouna Coundoul. Horwath and a lineup sprinkled with reserves earned a point with a 0-0 draw. Injuries kept Sutton and Thierry Henry from traveling with the club, while international duty removed Coundoul, Juan Agudelo, Tim Ream, Dane Richards, and Rafael Marquez from the Red Bulls lineup. In addition to Horwath, forward Luke Rodgers made his Major League Soccer debut, backups Carlos Mendes and Stephen Keel started in central defense, and backup Danleigh Borman started in midfield. Rookie Corey Hertzog made his MLS debut as a late substitute.

Several Red Bulls players enjoyed productive spells with their national sides during the late March international window. Forward Juan Agudelo came on as a second-half substitute and scored the tying goal for the United States in its 1-1 draw with Argentina on March 26. Three days later, Agudelo and defender Tim Ream went the full 90 for the U.S. in its 1-0 loss to Paraguay. Midfielder Dane Richards scored two goals for Jamaica in a 3-2 victory over El Salvador on March 29 while defender Rafael Marquez earned his 100th cap for Mexico when he captained El Tri to a victory over Paraguay on March 26.

MLS Results for March: 1 victory, 1 draw, 0 losses
MLS Results Season-to-Date: 1 victory, 1 draw, 0 losses; 4 points, 7th overall through 2 matches

=== April ===
The month started off with a blockbuster trade to acquire the #10 that Red Bull fans have long wanted. On April 1, the club pulled the trigger and sent second-year midfielder Tony Tchani, defender Danleigh Borman, and a first-round pick in the 2012 MLS SuperDraft to Toronto FC in exchange for midfielder Dwayne De Rosario. The deal provided New York with its most dangerous midfield playmaker since Amado Guevara left the squad in 2006. The trade of De Rosario by his hometown side was predicated on his demand for a new contract. The money issue was solved by Red Bulls with De Rosario's agent stating, "We have a very satisfactory agreement with NY and Dwayne can't wait to get on the field for them." Press reports also stated that Toronto would pay "a significant amount" of De Rosario's salary for 2011 and that De Rosario possesses a U.S. green card so he would not occupy an international roster slot for New York.

De Rosario debuted for New York as a second-half substitute versus Houston on April 2. His assist to Dane Richards proved the lone New York goal in a 1-1 draw. One week later, Red Bulls fell at Philadelphia Union by a 1-0 score, the lone goal a result of a horrible gaffe by defender Tim Ream.

Red Bulls then dominated the next two matches, winning by scorelines of 3-0 over San Jose Earthquakes and 4-0 at D.C. United. Luke Rodgers was named MLS Player of the Week for his 2-goal, 1 assist performance against San Jose. The thrashing of rivals D.C. United was especially sweet for Red Bull fans, marking New York's first 4-goal margin of victory on the road since 1996 and the largest ever margin of victory against DC. New York finished the month with a 1-0 victory over Sporting Kansas City with Rodgers again supplying the goal, giving him 3 goals in 3 matches. Likewise, strike partner Thierry Henry closed the month with a tally of 4 goals in 4 matches.

The club signed Supplemental Draft pick Teddy Schneider on April 12 to provide defensive cover. Two days later Red Bulls added Todd Hoffard as goalkeeping coach. Sporting Director Erik Solér stated, "Todd has a great deal of experience in American soccer and will be a valuable asset to our coaching squad."

Red Bulls also announced on April 28 that the club would go to London in late July to participate in the Emirates Cup, hosted by English Premier League side Arsenal. Red Bulls would become the first MLS club to participate in the tournament. It was widely viewed that the invitation came due to the storied past of New York Designated Player Thierry Henry with Arsenal. Opponents were announced as Paris Saint-Germain and Arsenal.

MLS Results for April: 3 victories, 1 draw, 1 loss
MLS Results Season-to-Date: 4 victories, 2 draws, 1 loss; 14 points, 2nd overall through 7 matches

=== May ===
May 7, 2011, witnessed the most expensive match in MLS history as New York traveled to play at Los Angeles Galaxy. For the first time ever five designated players were on the field for a league match: Thierry Henry and Rafa Marquez for Red Bulls and Landon Donovan, David Beckham, and former Red Bull Juan Pablo Ángel for Los Angeles. The game did not disappoint. Henry's early goal was matched by a Donovan score just before half. Tim Ream made an outstanding goal-line clearance, winning MLS Save of the Week, to thwart a second Donovan scoring chance before the break. The match ended a 1-1 draw, a fair result for Red Bulls against a quality opponent.

From Los Angeles, the club traveled cross-continent to Montreal for a mid-week friendly versus Montreal Impact. The timing of the match, which New York lost 1-0, left fans perplexed as Red Bulls had an upcoming match versus Chivas USA in just 4 days time. Sure enough, Red Bulls lost at home to Chivas USA in a driving rain by a 3-2 scoreline. Two Goats' goals came from set pieces, which quickly emerged as Red Bulls largest defensive failing for the rest of the season.

The remaining three matches of May all resulted in draws: at Houston 2-2, home to Colorado 2-2, and at Vancouver 1-1.

Near month's end, five players were called to international duty for the 2011 CONCACAF Gold Cup: Juan Agudelo and Tim Ream for the United States, Rafa Marquez for Mexico, Dane Richards for Jamaica, and Dwayne De Rosario for Canada. New York faced the prospect of losing the services of these 5 players for the entire month of June.

MLS Results for May: 0 victories, 4 draws, 1 loss
MLS Results Season-to-Date: 4 victories, 6 draws, 2 losses; 18 points, 5th overall through 12 matches

=== June ===
The loss of the regulars was keenly felt during a 1-1 draw at Columbus on June 4. A makeshift squad including Mehdi Ballouchy, Stephen Keel, Carlos Mendes, Austin da Luz, and substitute Matt Kassel conceded a 92nd-minute goal to drop 2 points. This match exposed the lack of depth on the squad, a shortcoming exacerbated by the reluctance of Hans Backe to give his younger players any meaningful minutes. The lack of depth, the unwillingness to use the bench, and consistently poor set piece defending became the defining points of the 2011 Red Bulls.

On June 10, Red Bulls saw their first victory in over a month when they defeated New England 2–1 at Red Bull Arena. GK Greg Sutton played hero as he saved a penalty in the 33rd minute.

Off the field, the club announced on June 10 that Chris Heck, a former National Basketball Association executive, would take over business operations from Erik Stover, who had overseen the construction of Red Bull Arena. As the season progressed, Heck expanded marketing and promotions geared more toward casual fans and families, including the use of Groupon.

The club signed rookie defender Mike Jones on June 12. Jones was released earlier in the season by Sporting Kansas City.

On June 19, Red Bulls made a fighting comeback against Portland Timbers to draw 3–3. After being down 3–1 and with less than 20 minutes to play, Henry started the comeback with a goal in the 73rd minute and De Rosario sealed the draw with a penalty goal in extra time by converting the spot kick in the 96th minute.

From Portland, Red Bulls traveled to Seattle Sounders FC and left with a tough 4–2 loss in front of a crowd of over 46,000. Seattle forward Roger Levesque came off the bench to score two goals within 10 minutes to assure his side's victory. GK Greg Sutton this time played goat, conceding one goal while arguing with the referee and another after being stripped of possession under little pressure. Also, New York played without Henry after the captain was controversially red carded late in the Portland match.

The road warrior segment of the schedule continued with a June 26 match at Chicago Fire. The match ended in a 1–1 draw with Joel Lindpere scoring the Red Bulls goal.

Internationally, the Gold Cup concluded with Rafa Marquez's Mexico squad beating Tim Ream and Juan Agudelo's United States side in the final on June 25.

On June 28, the first New York Derby was contested when Red Bulls faced F.C. New York in the third round of the 2011 U.S. Open Cup. The match ended with a 2–1 Red Bulls victory at Red Bull Arena. Rookies Corey Hertzog and John Rooney were the Red Bull goal scorers.

The shock of the month - if not the season - was provided on June 27 when the club announced it traded Dwayne De Rosario to rivals D.C. United for midfielder Dax McCarty. Red Bulls General Manager and Sporting Director Erik Soler said "Dax is an exciting young player who will immediately add his dynamic style of play to our midfield," and "he is an excellent two-way player who will contribute both to our defense and to our attack for seasons to come." The trading of perennial All Star De Rosario after only three months with New York stunned fans and media alike. That the club received only McCarty, who was left exposed in the 2010 MLS Expansion Draft just months earlier and had since fallen out of favor with his new D.C. club, was difficult to understand as captured in this actual column title from a Washington Post article: D.C. United trades McCarty for De Rosario, New York watches, giggles. The bewildering trade left Red Bull fans questioning the competence of General Manager Erik Soler. With only one league victory in the past two months, the abilities of Coach Hans Backe also became a growing subject of consternation.

MLS Results for June: 1 victory, 3 draws, 1 loss
MLS Results Season-to-Date: 5 victories, 9 draws, 3 losses; 24 points, 6th overall through 17 matches

=== July ===
Red Bulls opened July in similar fashion as June, with a 2-2 draw against San Jose Earthquakes at Stanford Stadium. Joel Lindpere saved the point for New York with his first brace of the season. He earned MLS Player of the Week for his performance.

On July 6, the team emphatically beat Toronto 5–0 with goals from Henry, Rodgers, Lindpere and a brace by Agudelo. The win was the club's biggest of the season and gave hope heading into the July 9 home match against D.C. United and De Rosario. The hope was misplaced, as a De Rosario goal gave D.C. a 1–0 victory at Red Bull Arena. This match would also prove to be the last started by Luke Rodgers for two months as the striker battled plantar fasciitis.

The league announced on July 10 that forward Thierry Henry and defenders Rafa Marquez and Tim Ream were selected to the 2011 MLS All-Star Game to be held at Red Bull Arena on July 27. Later in the month MLS Commissioner Don Garber announced that Juan Agudelo had been added to the MLS All-Star Game roster and that Joel Lindpere had been added as an inactive participant.

Another season low point was reached on July 12 when Red Bulls were eliminated from the U.S. Open Cup by a 4–0 thrashing at Chicago Fire in a quarterfinal match-up. Despite the fact that New York is the only original MLS club to never win a major trophy, team management decided that the U.S. Open Cup was not a priority and sent a squad lacking any regular starters to Chicago. Making matters worse, neither Coach Backe nor top assistant Jan Halvor Halvorsen traveled to Chicago. Instead, first-year assistant coach Mike Petke and injured player Carl Robinson were assigned to coach the squad of reserves against the Chicago starters. The ambivalence toward the Open Cup quarterfinal match infuriated Supporters Groups.

The following day, Red Bulls announced the signing of veteran German goalkeeper Frank Rost from Bundesliga club Hamburger SV. General Manager Erik Soler stated "Frank is a very experienced goalkeeper who will provide a strong presence in-between the posts for our club during our quest for a MLS title," and "we are thrilled that he has decided to join us in the middle of our campaign and look forward to his contributions for the remainder of the season." Rost became the club's third Designated Player.

The club traveled west to face Chivas USA on July 16 and came away with yet another draw, this one scoreless, in Rost's debut.

Off the field that same day, the club announced that goalkeeper Greg Sutton, made redundant with the arrival of Frank Rost, had been loaned to North American Soccer League side Montreal Impact for the remainder of the season. This marked a homecoming of sorts for Sutton, a native Canadian who spent six years with Montreal earlier in his career. The club also announced that it had acquired an international roster slot from D.C. United for future considerations. Two days later, the future considerations were confirmed as second-year midfielder Austin da Luz. Supporters were again confused by the move, this time for trading an inexpensive, capable, domestic player to rivals D.C. for an international slot that reverts to D.C. at season's end.

Coach Backe did not help his standing with the fanbase by publicly conceding his preseason goal of winning the Supporters Shield. Backe told the New York Post on July 18: "...even if I wanted to win the Shield, but that is gone."

The downward spiral continued with a 4-1 loss at Colorado on July 20. Three days later, Red Bulls did rescue a point from FC Dallas in a 2-2 home draw. Playing in stifling heat, Thierry Henry scored a late equalizer after Dane Richards had been sent off for his caution. That concluded league play for the month, with Red Bulls having now won 2 league matches in 3 months and having slipped to 9th place overall.

The All-Star game was held at Red Bull Arena on July 27. Coach Backe managed the MLS squad to a 4–0 defeat at the hands of English Premier League champions Manchester United.

On July 31, Red Bulls did manage to win a (meaningless) trophy: the 2011 Emirates Cup. After defeating Paris Saint-Germain of French Ligue 1 on July 30 by a 1–0 scoreline, Red Bulls then drew 1–1 against hosts, Arsenal of the English Premier League. Returning hero Thierry Henry was warmly received by Arsenal fans.

MLS Results for July: 1 victory, 3 draws, 2 losses
MLS Results Season-to-Date: 6 victories, 12 draws, 5 losses; 30 points, 9th overall through 23 matches

=== August ===
The next league match was August 6 at Real Salt Lake. Red Bulls showed the effects of the long journey from England, losing badly 3–0. The loss dropped New York back to a dead even won-lost record. To make matters worse, new goalkeeper Frank Rost was removed at halftime due to an injury he suffered while sitting on the airplane on the flight from London to America.

Draws by a 2–2 scoreline followed against Chicago on August 13 and New England on August 20, Dane Richards netting both goals in the latter game. The Chicago game featured emergency goalkeeper Chris Konopka as starter due to Rost's injury, the loan of Greg Sutton, an international call-up for Bouna Coundoul, and an apparent lack of faith by Coach Backe in third-string keeper Alex Horwath. It proved to be Konopka's only appearance of the season.

The marquee match of the month, the visit by first place Los Angeles Galaxy on August 28, was postponed until October 4 due to Hurricane Irene.

During August, Red Bulls traded a 2013 MLS SuperDraft pick to Sporting Kansas City for midfielder Stéphane Auvray and loaned rookie defender Tyler Lassiter to North American Soccer League side Carolina RailHawks. The club also continued its shakeup of staff members, relieving athletic trainer Rick Guter of his duties following 5 years of service. A replacement was not named.

The consistent lack of victories resulted in a continued fall in the standings. At month's end, Red Bulls had fallen to 11th place through 26 rounds. For the first time all season the club was outside the playoff picture.

MLS Results for August: 0 victories, 2 draws, 1 loss
MLS Results Season-to-Date: 6 victories, 14 draws, 6 losses; 32 points, 11th overall through 26 matches

=== September ===
With 8 matches to go and fighting for the playoffs, New York could ill afford to lose a starter but they did just that when Roy Miller was injured while playing internationally for Costa Rica on September 6. Miller missed two weeks. The club did regain the services of Luke Rodgers after 2 months out of the starting lineup.

Red Bulls hosted last place Vancouver on September 10 and earned another draw, this time 1–1. One week later Rodgers scored the only goal in a surprising 1–0 victory at Dallas. The joy of a victory was short-lived as the club returned home on September 21 and fell flat versus Salt Lake, losing 3–1. All 3 Salt Lake goals were conceded in the first 21 minutes of play.

After the Salt Lake match, Designated Player Rafa Marquez, who had been singled out recently by fans for his indifferent performance and lack of hustle, gave a scathing interview in which he denigrated his teammates, Tim Ream specifically. Among Marquez's statements were: "I think I am playing at my maximum level, and doing everything I can. I don't have, unfortunately, four defenders on my level that can help me out."; "Tim is still a young player with a lot to learn. He still has quite a lot to learn, and well, he has committed errors that are very infantile and cost us goals."; and "I think that this is a team game, and unfortunately, there isn't an equal level between perhaps (Thierry Henry) and myself, and our teammates." Despite Marquez's initial claims that he was misquoted, the interview was videotaped and posted in its entirety at a fan website. Two days later the club suspended Marquez for one match.

Red Bulls won the match that Marquez missed, beating Portland 2–0 on September 24. This result meant that Marquez had not played in any of the four most recent Red Bulls victories or in any of the four most recent Red Bulls shutouts. The win moved the club back into playoff position, 9th overall.

MLS Results for September: 2 victories, 1 draw, 1 loss
MLS Results Season-to-Date: 8 victories, 15 draws, 7 losses; 39 points, 9th overall through 30 matches

=== October ===
Marquez returned for the October 1 match at Toronto and his impact was felt. His early second-half giveaway and failure to hustle back defensively resulted in a Toronto goal. Only a sterling late game finish by Thierry Henry allowed Red Bulls to rescue a point through a 1–1 draw.

The rescheduled home match against Los Angeles was played on October 4. Red Bulls looked sharp and earned a 2–0 victory which placed them on the cusp of clinching a playoff spot. However, in the inconsistent manner exhibited by the club all season long, a flat New York squad next fell at Kansas City 2–0. Henry was issued a straight red card in the match, causing him to miss the final league match with the club needing a result to ensure a playoff spot.

Prior to the final match, General Manager Erik Soler told The New York Times that Coach Hans Backe would return for 2012. Soler also addressed the June trade of Dwayne De Rosario to D.C. United, deflecting blame by stating: "He didn't work out, he didn't score. He's a great player as long as he has the ball, and we already have those kinds of players here. Our problem is not scoring goals, our problem is defensive mistakes. He's not a guy who likes to play a complementary role. He didn't fit in. I'm happy for him. He's a great guy, but he wouldn't score 15 goals here. We know that Thierry Henry needs the ball, and on a smaller scale DeRo is the same. It's not our mistake. It just didn't work out."

The last league match was home to Philadelphia on October 20. An early Dane Richards goal proved enough for a 1–0 victory that clinched the 10th and final playoff spot for Red Bulls.

MLS Results for October: 2 victories, 1 draw, 1 loss
MLS Results Regular Season (Final): 10 victories, 16 draws, 8 losses; 44 points, 10th overall

New York opened the postseason with a one-game Wild Card round playoff at Dallas. Goals by Joel Lindpere and Thierry Henry led Red Bulls to a surprising 2–0 win.

The victory over Dallas earned New York a two-game series with Supporters Shield winners Los Angeles Galaxy. The first match was played October 30 at Red Bull Arena. Former Red Bull Mike Magee scored the game's lone goal to win the match for Galaxy. After the match, a skirmish erupted when Marquez threw the ball at Galaxy captain Landon Donovan, hitting the American international in the foot. Nearby Galaxy player Adam Cristman took offense and confronted Marquez, who responded by punching (and missing) wildly and seemingly attempting to headbutt Cristman. Other players joined the fray, with Los Angeles midfielder Juninho landing an elbow to the face of unsuspecting Red Bulls defender Stephen Keel. Marquez inexplicably grabbed his face and flopped to the ground when other players approached, though no player was near enough to make contact with him. He and Juninho were both shown red cards for their actions, causing them to miss the return leg in Los Angeles. Two days later, the league suspended Marquez an additional two matches for: "attempting to head butt Adam Cristman, attempting to punch Adam Cristman; striking Cristman, and simulating that he had been struck in the face." The extra suspension ended Marquez's 2011 season.

MLS Playoff Results: Wild Card victory over FC Dallas; trailing 1–0 in aggregate to Los Angeles Galaxy

=== November ===
Red Bulls faced a daunting task needing to win in Los Angeles, something no visiting club had managed all season. In the return leg on November 3, an early Luke Rodgers goal tied the series and gave Red Bulls hope. New York carried play until midfielder Teemu Tainio was forced out with injury at 16 minutes. From there, the match turned toward Los Angeles with Galaxy finally regaining the aggregate lead on a Mike Magee goal minutes before halftime. A second-half goal by Landon Donovan cemented the series victory for Los Angeles and ended another disappointing season for New York Red Bulls.

On November 9 the club announced team awards for 2011: Most Valuable Player - Thierry Henry; Newcomer of the Year - Luke Rodgers; Defender of the Year - Jan Gunnar Solli; Humanitarian of the Year - Stephen Keel.

To add insult to injury, Dwayne De Rosario, discarded after less than three months with New York, was named 2011 Most Valuable Player of Major League Soccer.

Rafa Marquez's suspension will carry over to the first two matches of 2012.

MLS Playoff Results: Conference Semifinal defeat to Los Angeles Galaxy

== Team information ==
=== Squad ===
At close of the 2011 season.

No.	Name	Nationality	Position	Date of birth (age)	Previous club
Goalkeepers
1	Frank Rost	(Germany)	GK	June 30, 1973 (age 53)	(Germany) Hamburg
18	Bouna Coundoul	(Senegal)	GK	March 4, 1982 (age 44)	(United States) Colorado
24	Greg Sutton	(Canada)	GK	April 19, 1977 (age 49)	(Canada) Toronto
31	Alex Horwath	(United States)	GK	March 27, 1987 (age 39)	Unattached
Defenders
3	Chris Albright	(United States)	RB	January 14, 1979 (age 47)	(United States) New England
4	Rafael Márquez	(Mexico)	CB	February 13, 1979 (age 47)	(Spain) Barcelona
5	Tim Ream	(United States)	CB	October 5, 1987 (age 38)	(United States) St. Louis University
7	Roy Miller	(Costa Rica)	LB	November 24, 1984 (age 41)	(Norway) Rosenborg
8	Jan Gunnar Solli	(Norway)	RB	April 19, 1981 (age 45)	(Norway) Brann
12	Tyler Lassiter	(United States)	CB	April 7, 1989 (age 37)	(United States) N.C. State University
23	Mike Jones	(United States)	LB	April 7, 1988 (age 38)	(United States) Kansas City
26	Stephen Keel	(United States)	CB	April 11, 1983 (age 43)	(United States) Portland (D2)
39	Teddy Schneider	(United States)	CB	November 23, 1988 (age 37)	(United States) Princeton University
44	Carlos Mendes	(United States)	CB	December 25, 1980 (age 45)	(United States) Rochester
91	Šaćir Hot	(United States)	CB	June 10, 1991 (age 35)	(United States) Red Bulls Academy
Midfielders
2	Teemu Tainio	(Finland)	CM/DM	November 27, 1979 (age 46)	(Netherlands) Ajax
10	Mehdi Ballouchy	(Morocco)	CM	April 6, 1983 (age 43)	(United States) Colorado
11	Dax McCarty	(United States)	MF	April 30, 1987 (age 39)	(United States) D.C. United
15	Matt Kassel	(United States)	RM/AM	October 30, 1989 (age 36)	(United States) Red Bulls Academy
16	John Rooney	(England)	CM/DM	December 17, 1990 (age 35)	(England) Macclesfield Town
19	Dane Richards	(Jamaica)	LW/RW	December 14, 1983 (age 42)	(United States) Clemson University
20	Joel Lindpere	(Estonia)	CM/LW	October 5, 1981 (age 44)	(Norway) Tromsø
21	Brian Nielsen (on loan from Red Bull Salzburg)	(Denmark)	AM/LW	February 25, 1987 (age 39)	(Denmark) Vejle (loan)
25	Stéphane Auvray	(Guadeloupe)	DM/CM	September 4, 1981 (age 45)	(United States) Kansas City
32	Marcos Paullo	(Brazil)	LW/AM	March 28, 1990 (age 36)	(Brazil) Atlético Paranaense
33	Carl Robinson	(Wales)	DM/CM	October 13, 1976 (age 49)	(Canada) Toronto
Forwards
6	Corey Hertzog	(United States)	ST/RW	August 1, 1990 (age 36)	(United States) Penn State University
9	Luke Rodgers	(England)	ST	January 1, 1982 (age 44)	(England) Notts County
14	Thierry Henry	(France)	ST	August 17, 1977 (age 49)	(Spain) Barcelona
17	Juan Agudelo	(United States)	ST	November 23, 1992 (age 33)	(United States) Red Bulls Academy

=== International players ===
The following players on the club have received international call-ups during the season or within the previous year:

Country	Player	Position
(Costa Rica)	Roy Miller	DF
(Jamaica)	Dane Richards	MF
(Mexico)	Rafael Márquez	DF
(Norway)	Jan Gunnar Solli	MF
(Senegal)	Bouna Coundoul	GK
(United States)	Juan Agudelo	FW
(United States)	Tim Ream	DF

== Player movement ==
=== Transfers ===
==== In ====
Date	Player	Position	Previous club	Fee/notes	Ref
January 13, 2011	(United States) Corey Hertzog	FW	(United States) Penn State	SuperDraft, 1st round	
January 13, 2011	(England) John Rooney	MF	(England) Macclesfield Town	SuperDraft, 2nd round	
January 25, 2011	(United States) Matt Kassel	MF	(United States) Red Bulls Academy	Free	
January 26, 2011	(Norway) Jan Gunnar Solli	MF	(Norway) Brann	Free	
January 28, 2011	(England) Luke Rodgers	FW	(England) Notts County	Undisclosed	
January 30, 2011	(Brazil) Marcos Paullo	MF	(Brazil) Atletico Paranaense	Free	
January 31, 2011	(United States) Šaćir Hot	DF	(United States) Red Bulls Academy	Free	
March 9, 2011	(Finland) Teemu Tainio	MF	(Netherlands) Ajax	Free	
March 9, 2011	(United States) Stephen Keel	DF	(United States) Portland Timbers (USL)	Free	
March 23, 2011	(United States) Tyler Lassiter	DF	(United States) North Carolina State	SuperDraft, 2nd round	
March 25, 2011	(United States) Alex Horwath	GK	Unattached	Free	
April 1, 2011	(Canada) Dwayne De Rosario	MF	(Canada) Toronto	Acquired for Tony Tchani, Danleigh Borman, and a 2012 SuperDraft 1st round pick	
April 12, 2011	(United States) Teddy Schneider	DF	(United States) Princeton	Supplemental Draft, 2nd round	
June 18, 2011	(United States) Mike Jones	DF	(United States) Kansas City	Free	
June 28, 2011	(United States) Dax McCarty	MF	(United States) D.C. United	Acquired for Dwayne De Rosario	
July 12, 2011	(Germany) Frank Rost	GK	(Germany) Hamburg	Free	
August 12, 2011	(Guadeloupe) Stéphane Auvray	MF	(United States) Kansas City	Acquired for a 2013 SuperDraft 2nd round pick	
August 13, 2011	(United States) Chris Konopka	GK	(Republic of Ireland) Waterford United	Free, signed from MLS Goalkeeper Pool	

==== Out ====
Date	Player	Position	Destination club	Fee/notes	Ref
November 5, 2010	(United States) Seth Stammler	MF	None	Retired	
November 5, 2010	(United States) Mike Petke	DF	None	Retired, now coach with Red Bulls	
November 11, 2010	(United States) Carey Talley	DF	None	Released, then retired	
November 22, 2010	(United States) Jeremy Hall	MF	(United States) Portland Timbers	Traded for a 3rd round SuperDraft pick	
December 15, 2010	(Colombia) Juan Pablo Ángel	FW	(United States) Los Angeles Galaxy	Re-Entry Draft	
December 15, 2010	(United States) Luke Sassano	MF	(United States) Los Angeles Galaxy	Re-Entry Draft	
January 24, 2011	(Bosnia and Herzegovina) Siniša Ubiparipović	MF	(Canada) Montreal Impact	Option declined, free transfer	
January 28, 2011	(New Zealand) Andrew Boyens	DF	(United States) Chivas USA	Option declined, free transfer	
March 1, 2011	(United States) Conor Chinn	FW	(United States) Real Salt Lake	Waived, free transfer	
March 1, 2011	(United States) Irving Garcia	MF	(Guatemala) Antigua GFC	Waived	
March 15, 2011	(Georgia (country)) Giorgi Chirgadze	FW	(Georgia (country)) Metalurgi Rustavi	Released	
March 21, 2011	(Ghana) Salou Ibrahim	FW	(Belgium) OH Leuven	Waived	
April 1, 2011	(Cameroon) Tony Tchani	MF	(Canada) Toronto	Traded with a 2012 SuperDraft 1st round pick for Dwayne De Rosario	
April 1, 2011	(South Africa) Danleigh Borman	DF	(Canada) Toronto	Traded with a 2012 SuperDraft 1st round pick for Dwayne De Rosario	
June 28, 2011	(Canada) Dwayne De Rosario	MF	(United States) D.C. United	Traded for Dax McCarty	
July 18, 2011	(United States) Austin da Luz	MF	(United States) D.C. United	Traded for a 2011 international roster slot	
August 14, 2011	(United States) Chris Konopka	GK	(United States) Philadelphia Union	Released back to MLS Goalkeeper Pool after emergency loan	

=== Loans ===
==== In ====
Date	Player	Position	Loaned from	Fee/notes	Ref
April 14, 2010	(Denmark) Brian Nielsen	MF	(Austria) Red Bull Salzburg	Loan thru 2011 season	

==== Out ====
Date	Player	Position	Loaned to	Fee/notes	Ref
July 16, 2011	(Canada) Greg Sutton	GK	(Canada) Montreal Impact	Loan for remainder of 2011 season	
August 30, 2011	(United States) Tyler Lassiter	DF	(United States) Carolina RailHawks	Loan for remainder of 2011 NASL season	

== Player statistics ==
Statistics for MLS league matches through October 21, 2011.

No	Nat	Player	Pos	Games	Starts	Minutes	Goals	Assists	Booked	Sent off (straight red)
1	(Germany)	Frank Rost	GK	11	11	945	0	0	0	0
18	(Senegal)	Bouna Coundoul	GK	12	11	1035	0	0	0	0
24	(Canada)	Greg Sutton	GK	10	10	900	0	0	1	0
31	(United States)	Alex Horwath	GK	1	1	90	0	0	0	0
40	(United States)	Chris Konopka	GK	1	1	90	0	0	0	0
3	(United States)	Chris Albright	DF	8	6	482	0	0	0	0
4	(Mexico)	Rafael Márquez	DF	19	19	1684	0	5	5	0
5	(United States)	Tim Ream	DF	28	28	2520	0	1	2	0
7	(Costa Rica)	Roy Miller	DF	30	30	2699	0	3	5	0
8	(Norway)	Jan Gunnar Solli	DF	31	31	2643	0	6	1	1
12	(United States)	Tyler Lassiter	DF	0	0	0	0	0	0	0
22	(United States)	Stephen Keel	DF	16	13	1226	0	2	3	0
23	(United States)	Mike Jones	DF	1	0	1	0	0	0	0
44	(United States)	Carlos Mendes	DF	18	16	1505	0	0	3	0
39	(United States)	Teddy Schneider	DF	0	0	0	0	0	0	0
91	(United States)	Šaćir Hot	DF	0	0	0	0	0	0	0
-	(South Africa)	Danleigh Borman*	DF	2	1	91	0	0	0	0
2	(Finland)	Teemu Tainio	MF	28	28	2407	0	2	7	1
10	(Morocco)	Mehdi Ballouchy	MF	29	17	1519	2	1	4	0
11	(United States)	Dax McCarty	MF	16	14	1175	0	3	1	0
15	(United States)	Matt Kassel	MF	2	0	82	0	0	0	0
16	(England)	John Rooney	MF	5	0	48	0	0	0	0
19	(Jamaica)	Dane Richards	MF	27	27	2333	7	7	5	1
20	(Estonia)	Joel Lindpere	MF	34	34	3048	7	7	4	0
21	(Denmark)	Brian Nielsen	MF	1	0	4	0	0	0	0
25	(Guadeloupe)	Stéphane Auvray	MF	6	1	124	0	0	0	0
32	(Brazil)	Marcos Paullo	MF	0	0	0	0	0	0	0
33	(Wales)	Carl Robinson	MF	2	0	54	0	0	0	0
-	(Cameroon)	Tony Tchani*	MF	2	1	112	0	0	0	0
-	(Canada)	Dwayne De Rosario*	MF	13	12	1113	2	4	2	0
-	(United States)	Austin da Luz*	MF	7	4	367	1	1	2	0
6	(United States)	Corey Hertzog	FW	5	0	35	0	0	0	0
9	(England)	Luke Rodgers	FW	23	20	1560	9	3	6	0
14	(France)	Thierry Henry	FW	26	26	2266	14	4	3	2
17	(United States)	Juan Agudelo	FW	27	12	1364	6	2	1	0
Total				34		3060	50**	50	55	5

* = No longer with the club.
** = Goals total includes 2 own goals scored by opposition.

=== Goalkeeper statistics ===
Statistics for MLS league matches through October 21, 2011.

No	Nat	Player	Games	Starts	Minutes	Record (W-D-L)	GA	GAA	SO
1	(Germany)	Frank Rost	11	11	945	4-3-4	14	1.33	5
18	(Senegal)	Bouna Coundoul	12	11	1035	3-6-2	13	1.13	3
24	(Canada)	Greg Sutton	10	10	900	3-5-2	15	1.50	2
31	(United States)	Alex Horwath	1	1	90	0-1-0	0	0.00	1
40	(United States)	Chris Konopka	1	1	90	0-1-0	2	2.00	0
Total			34		3060	10-16-8	44	1.29	11

== Club staff ==
Position	Staff
Sporting Director	(Norway) Erik Solér
Head Coach	(Sweden) Hans Backe
Assistant Coach	(Norway) Jan Halvor Halvorsen
Individual Development Coach	(United States) Mike Petke
Goalkeeping Coach	(United States) Todd Hoffard
Technical Director	(Brazil) Ricardo Campos
Athletic Trainer	
Strength & Conditioning Coach	(United States) Scott Piri
Asst. Strength & Conditioning Coach	(United States) Jeremy Holsopple
Team Administrator	(Spain) Juan Romero
Asst. Athletic Trainer	(United States) Michelle Lafiosca
Equipment Manager	(Colombia) Fernando Ruiz
Asst. Equipment Manager	(United States) Sean Ruiz
Massage Therapist	(United States) Traci Snyder

Last updated: August 21, 2011
Source: New York Red Bulls Official Website

== Competitions ==
=== Overall ===
Competition	Started round	Current position / round	Final position / round	First match	Last match
MLS	—	10th		March 19, 2011	October 20, 2011
U.S. Open Cup	Third round	—	Quarter-finals	June 28, 2011	July 12, 2011

Updated to match played October 19, 2011
Source: Competitions

== Standings ==
=== Overall standings ===
Pos	Team	Pld	W	L	T	GF	GA	GD	Pts	Qualification
1	LA Galaxy (S, C)	34	19	5	10	48	28	+20	67	CONCACAF Champions League
2	Seattle Sounders FC	34	18	7	9	56	37	+19	63	CONCACAF Champions League
3	Real Salt Lake	34	15	11	8	44	36	+8	53	CONCACAF Champions League
4	FC Dallas	34	15	12	7	42	39	+3	52	
5	Sporting Kansas City	34	13	9	12	50	40	+10	51	
6	Houston Dynamo	34	12	9	13	45	41	+4	49	CONCACAF Champions League
7	Colorado Rapids	34	12	9	13	44	41	+3	49	
8	Philadelphia Union	34	11	8	15	44	36	+8	48	
9	Columbus Crew	34	13	13	8	43	44	−1	47	
10	New York Red Bulls	34	10	8	16	50	44	+6	46	
11	Chicago Fire	34	9	9	16	46	45	+1	43	
12	Portland Timbers	34	11	14	9	40	48	−8	42	
13	D.C. United	34	9	13	12	49	52	−3	39	
14	San Jose Earthquakes	34	8	12	14	40	45	−5	38	
15	Chivas USA	34	8	14	12	41	43	−2	36	
16	Toronto FC	34	6	13	15	36	59	−23	33	CONCACAF Champions League
17	New England Revolution	34	5	16	13	38	58	−20	28	
18	Vancouver Whitecaps FC	34	6	18	10	35	55	−20	28	

Source: MLS
Rules for classification: 1) points; 2) head-to-head record; 3) goal difference; 4) number of goals scored
(C) Champions; (S) Supporters' Shield

==== Results summary ====
Overall								Home						Away					
Pld	W	D	L	GF	GA	GD	Pts	W	D	L	GF	GA	GD	W	D	L	GF	GA	GD
34	10	16	8	50	44	+6	46	8	6	3	29	17	+12	2	10	5	21	27	−6

Last updated: October 21, 2011.
Source: Competitive Matches

=== Results by rounds ===
Round	1	2	3	4	5	6	7	8	9	10	11	12	13	14	15	16	17	18	19	20	21	22	23	24	25	26	27	28	29	30	31	32	33	34
Stadium	H	A	H	A	H	A	H	A	H	A	H	A	A	H	A	A	A	A	H	H	A	A	H	A	H	A	H	A	H	H	A	H	A	H
Result	W	D	D	L	W	W	W	D	L	D	D	D	D	W	D	L	D	D	W	L	D	L	D	L	D	D	D	W	L	W	D	W	L	W
Position	5	7	5	11	4	3	2	2	2	5	4	5	5	4	4	6	6	7	6	6	7	10	9	11	11	11	11	10	11	9	10	9	10	10

Updated to match(es) played on October 23, 2011. Source: NYRedBulls.com
A = Away; H = Home; W = Win; D = Draw; L = Loss

== Match results ==
=== Pre-season ===
Kickoff times are in EST.

February 9, 2011 Mexico Tour	Atlante	0–0 (3–4 p)	New York	Cancún, Mexico
21:00		Report	(yellow card) 44' Solli; (yellow card) 73' Ibrahim	Stadium: Andrés Quintana Roo; Attendance: 6,002; Referee: Ricardo Arellano
	Penalties
	Maldonado (penalty scored); Landín (penalty scored); Ortiz (penalty missed); Fonseca (penalty scored); Muñoz (penalty missed); Guadarrama (penalty missed)		(penalty scored) Lassiter; (penalty scored) Hertzog; (penalty missed) Robinson; (penalty missed) Rooney; (penalty scored) Ibrahim; (penalty scored) da Luz

February 12, 2011 Mexico Tour	Atlante Reserves	1–3	New York	Riviera Maya, Mexico
16:30	Toloza (yellow card) 33'; Vigil 83'	Report	30' Henry; 80' Kassel; 85' Hertzog	Attendance: Closed Door

February 15, 2011 Mexico Tour	Guadalajara	3–2	New York	Zapopan, Mexico
21:00	Fabián (yellow card) 35'; Álvarez (yellow card) 43'; Jesús Sánchez 71'; Mendes 80' (o.g.); Dávila (yellow card) 90+1'; Jorge Mora 90+3'	Report	29' (yellow card) 80' (yellow-red card) 85' Richards; 39' Agudelo	Stadium: Estadio Omnilife; Referee: Roman Rafael Medina

February 23, 2011 Florida Tour	Chicago	1–1	New York	Fort Lauderdale, Florida
13:00	Pappa 53'	Report	18' Lindpere	Stadium: Lockhart Stadium; Attendance: Closed Door

February 26, 2011 Florida Tour	Fort Lauderdale	0–2	New York	Fort Lauderdale, Florida
15:30	Wheeler (yellow card) 44'; Mowouve (yellow card) 79'	Report	2' Henry; 75' Ballouchy	Stadium: Lockhart Stadium; Attendance: 3,000

March 5, 2011 Desert Cup	Kansas City	2–2	New York	Tucson, Arizona
22:00	Arnaud 20'; Kamara 61' (pen.)	Report	22' Henry; 76' Richards	Stadium: Hi Corbett Field; Attendance: 10,087

March 8, 2011 Red Bull; Reto del Sol	Atlas	1–1	New York	Glendale, Arizona
22:00	Ream 78' (o.g.)	Report	(yellow card) 23' Ballouchy; (yellow card) 82' Henry; 90' (pen.) Marquez	Stadium: University of Phoenix Stadium; Attendance: 23,644; Referee: Silviu Petrescu

=== Major League Soccer ===
Kickoff times are in EDT.

March 19, 2011 Match 1	New York	1–0	Seattle	Harrison, New Jersey
19:30	Agudelo 70'	Report	Hurtado (yellow card) 61'	Stadium: Red Bull Arena; Attendance: 20,982; Referee: Jair Marrufo

March 26, 2011 Match 2	Columbus	0–0	New York	Columbus, Ohio
16:00		Report	Keel (yellow card) 29'; Miller (yellow card) 89'	Stadium: Crew Stadium; Attendance: 10,306; Referee: Abbey Okulaja

April 2, 2011 Match 3	New York	1–1	Houston	Harrison, New Jersey
19:30	Richards 47'	Report	Weaver 50' (yellow card) 73'	Stadium: Red Bull Arena; Attendance: 13,664; Referee: Ricardo Salazar

April 9, 2011 Match 4	Philadelphia	1–0	New York	Chester, Pennsylvania
19:00	Torres 68'; Mwanga (yellow card) 77'	Report; Live TV: ESPN2	Márquez (yellow card) 14'; Richards (yellow card) 29'; Miller (yellow card) 82'	Stadium: PPL Park; Attendance: 19,027; Referee: Alex Prus

April 16, 2011 Match 5	New York	3–0	San Jose	Harrison, New Jersey
19:30	Rodgers 2', 15' (yellow card) 55'; De Rosario (yellow card) 32'; Henry 87'	Report	McDonald (yellow card) 55'	Stadium: Red Bull Arena; Attendance: 14,308; Referee: Chris Penso

April 21, 2011 Match 6	D.C. United	0–4	New York	Washington, D.C.
20:00		Report; Live TV: ESPN2	Henry 11', 37'; Lindpere 76'; Agudelo 90+2'	Stadium: RFK Memorial Stadium; Attendance: 18,052; Referee: Jorge González

April 30, 2011 Match 7	New York	1–0	Kansas City	Harrison, New Jersey
19:30	Rodgers 22' (yellow card) 32'; Tainio (yellow card) 42'; Ballouchy (yellow card) 90+3'	Report		Stadium: Red Bull Arena; Attendance: 20,636; Referee: Andrew Chapin

May 7, 2011 Match 8	Los Angeles	1–1	New York	Carson, California
23:00	Donovan 41'	Report; Live TV: ESPN2	Henry 4'; Rodgers (yellow card) 57'	Stadium: The Home Depot Center; Attendance: 27,000; Referee: Edvin Jurisevic

May 15, 2011 Match 9	New York	2–3	Chivas USA	Harrison, New Jersey
19:00	Henry 21' (yellow card) 62'; De Rosario 35' (pen.)	Report; Live TV: Galavisión	Braun 6', 31', 55'; Cortez (yellow card) 81'	Stadium: Red Bull Arena; Attendance: 16,375; Referee: Alex Prus

May 21, 2011 Match 10	Houston	2–2	New York	Houston, Texas
20:30	Davis 12' (pen.) (yellow card) 64'; Boswell (yellow card) 50'; Koke 82'	Report	Richards 1'; Márquez (yellow card) 62'; Ballouchy 90+1'	Stadium: Robertson Stadium; Attendance: 25,314; Referee: Juan Guzmán

May 25, 2011 Match 11	New York	2–2	Colorado	Harrison, New Jersey
20:00	Henry 29' (yellow card) 31'; Rodgers 33'; Mendes (yellow card) 44'	Report	LaBauex (yellow card) 10'; Larentowicz 27', 32'	Stadium: Red Bull Arena; Attendance: 18,081; Referee: Jorge González

May 28, 2011 Match 12	Vancouver	1–1	New York	Vancouver, British Columbia
19:00	Hassli 23' (pen.)	Report	Rodgers 33'; Ream (yellow card) 75'	Stadium: Empire Field; Attendance: 21,000; Referee: Mark Geiger

June 4, 2011 Match 13	New York	1–1	Columbus	Harrison, New Jersey
19:30	Ballouchy 9' da Luz (yellow card) 55'	Report	Balchan (yellow card) 32' (goal) 90+2'; Ekpo (yellow card) 72'	Stadium: Red Bull Arena; Attendance: 20,393; Referee: Niko Bratsis

June 10, 2011 Match 14	New York	2–1	New England	Harrison, New Jersey
20:30	Cochrane 37' (o.g.); Keel (yellow card) 33'; Henry 50'; Ballouchy (yellow card) 57'	Report; Live TV: FSC	Boggs 54'	Stadium: Red Bull Arena; Attendance: 21,201; Referee: Terry Vaughn

June 19, 2011 Match 15	Portland	3–3	New York	Portland, Oregon
22:00	Jewsbury 48'; Goldthwaite 50'; Keel 68' (o.g.); Wallace (yellow card) 74'; Moffat (yellow card) 90+3'	Report; Live TV: ESPN2	da Luz 5'; Henry 73' (red card) 90+3'; Lindpere (yellow card) 74'; Sutton (yellow card) 76'; Tainio (yellow card) 89'; Mendes (yellow card) 90'; De Rosario 90+6' (pen.)	Stadium: Jeld-Wen Field; Attendance: 18,627; Referee: Ricardo Salazar

June 23, 2011 Match 16	Seattle	4–2	New York	Seattle, Washington
22:00	Friberg 11'; Alonso 12' (yellow card) 60'; Riley (yellow card) 52'; Levesque 68', 78'; Rosales (yellow card) 90'	Report; Live TV: ESPN2	Tainio (yellow card) 29'; Richards 31' da Luz (yellow card) 50'; Scott 58' (o.g.); De Rosario (yellow card) 90+3'	Stadium: CenturyLink Field; Attendance: 46,065; Referee: Michael Kennedy

June 26, 2011 Match 17	Chicago	1–1	New York	Bridgeview, Illinois
14:00	Cuesta (yellow card) 14'; Paladini (yellow card) 37'; Nyarko (yellow card) 49'; Pappa 58'	Report; Live TV: ESPN	Lindpere 40'; Mendes (yellow card) 53'; Tainio (yellow card) 77'	Stadium: Toyota Park; Attendance: 16,961; Referee: Kevin Stott

July 2, 2011 Match 18	San Jose	2–2	New York	Stanford, California
22:30	Hernandez (yellow card) 32'; Stephenson 37'; Johnson (yellow card) 40'; Busch (yellow card) 64'; Lenhart 68'; Burling (yellow card) 80' (yellow-red card) 90+1'	Report; Live TV: ESPN2	Lindpere 7', 85'; Miller (yellow card) 60'	Stadium: Stanford Stadium; Attendance: 41,028; Referee: Edvin Jurisevic

July 6, 2011 Match 19	New York	5–0	Toronto	Harrison, New Jersey
20:00	Henry 33'; Rodgers 38' (yellow card) 39'; Lindpere 52'; Tainio (yellow card) 59'; Agudelo 67', 89'	Report; Live TV: TSN	Stinson (yellow card) 62'	Stadium: Red Bull Arena; Attendance: 15,269; Referee: Geoff Gamble

July 9, 2011 Match 20	New York	1-0	D.C. United	Harrison, New Jersey
19:30	Richards (yellow card) 82'; Miller (yellow card) 85'; De Rosario 61'; Davies (yellow card) 85'	Report		Stadium: Red Bull Arena; Attendance: 22,200; Referee: Jair Marrufo

July 16, 2011 Match 21	Chivas USA	0–0	New York	Carson, California
22:30	Trujillo (yellow card) 39'; Zemanski (yellow card) 59'	Report; Live TV: Galavisión		Stadium: The Home Depot Center; Attendance: 14,838; Referee: Mark Kadlecik

July 20, 2011 Match 22	Colorado	4–1	New York	Commerce City, Colorado
21:30	Nyassi 2', 30', 61'; Thompson 26' (yellow card) 26'	Report	Ballouchy (yellow card) 27'; Solli (yellow card) 36'; Richards (yellow card) 60'; Henry 67'	Stadium: Dick's Sporting Goods Park; Attendance: 15,227; Referee: Silviu Petrescu

July 23, 2011 Match 23	New York	2–2	Dallas	Harrison, New Jersey
18:00	Agudelo 39'; Richards (yellow card) 50' (yellow-red card) 80'; Ream (yellow card) 59'; Henry 85'	Report; Live TV: Galavisión	Chávez 51', 78'; Guarda (yellow card) 79'; Jacobson (yellow card) 83'	Stadium: Red Bull Arena; Attendance: 17,276; Referee: Jorge Gonzalez

August 6, 2011 Match 24	Real Salt Lake	3–0	New York	Sandy, Utah
21:00	Borchers 13'; Gil 44'; Saborio 77'; Johnson (yellow card) 84'	Report	Márquez (yellow card) 76'	Stadium: Rio Tinto Stadium; Attendance: 19,081; Referee: Elias Bazakos

August 13, 2011 Match 25	New York	2–2	Chicago	Harrison, New Jersey
19:30	Henry 9'; Lindpere 63' (yellow card) 64'	Report	Oduro 16'; Grazzini 24' (yellow card) 26'	Stadium: Red Bull Arena; Attendance: 25,177; Referee: Jair Marrufo

August 20, 2011 Match 26	New England	2–2	New York	Foxborough, Massachusetts
19:30	Caraglio 15', 37' (yellow card) 17'; Mansally (yellow card) 33' (yellow-red card) 55'	Report	McCarty (yellow card) 45'; Tainio (yellow card) 49' (yellow-red card) 69'; Richards 53', 87'; Miller (yellow card) 89'; Márquez (yellow card) 90+2'	Stadium: Gillette Stadium; Attendance: 18,882; Referee: Juan Guzman

August 28, 2011 Postponed	New York	---	Los Angeles	Harrison, New Jersey
--:--		Report		Stadium: Red Bull Arena
Note: Match postponed due to severe inclement weather from Hurricane Irene.

September 10, 2011 Match 27	New York	1–1	Vancouver	Harrison, New Jersey
19:30	Márquez (yellow card) 31'; Solli (red card) 45+1'; Agudelo 68'; Henry (yellow card) 73'	Report	Chiumiento 23'	Stadium: Red Bull Arena; Attendance: 19,684; Referee: Terry Vaughn

September 17, 2011 Match 28	Dallas	0–1	New York	Frisco, Texas
20:30		Report	Rodgers 36'; Richards (yellow card) 70'; Lindpere (yellow card) 75'; Ballouchy (yellow card) 85'	Stadium: Pizza Hut Park; Attendance: 17,019; Referee: Jair Marrufo

September 21, 2011 Match 29	New York	1–3	Real Salt Lake	Harrison, New Jersey
20:00	Rodgers (yellow card) 47'; Lindpere 69'	Report	Saborío 7'; Espíndola 11', 21'	Stadium: Red Bull Arena; Attendance: 14,266; Referee: Jorge Gonzalez

September 24, 2011 Match 30	New York	2–0	Portland	Harrison, New Jersey
19:30	Richards 21'; Rodgers 66' (pen.)	Report	Jewsbury (yellow card) 40'; Alhassan (red card) 64'	Stadium: Red Bull Arena; Attendance: 25,008; Referee: Alex Prus

October 1, 2011 Match 31	Toronto	1–1	New York	Toronto, Ontario
19:30	Koevermans 50'	Report; Live TV: FSC	Keel (yellow card) 78'; Henry 88'	Stadium: BMO Field; Attendance: 20,132; Referee: Hilario Grajeda

October 4, 2011 Match 32	New York	2–0	Los Angeles	Harrison, New Jersey
20:00	Rodgers 32'; Lindpere (yellow card) 33'; Henry 58'	Report; Live TV: ESPN2	Hejduk (yellow card) 13'; DeLaGarza (yellow card) 45+2'	Stadium: Red Bull Arena; Attendance: 25,186; Referee: Jair Marrufo

October 15, 2011 Match 33	Kansas City	2–0	New York	Kansas City, Kansas
16:00	Bunbury 57'; Sapong 74'	Report; Live TV: TeleFutura	Henry (red card) 28'	Stadium: Livestrong Sporting Park; Attendance: 19,921; Referee: Kevin Stott

October 20, 2011 Match 34	New York	1–0	Philadelphia	Harrison, New Jersey
20:00	Richards 8'; Tainio (yellow card) 29'; Rodgers (yellow card) 66'	Report; Live TV: ESPN2	(yellow card) 55' Carroll	Stadium: Red Bull Arena; Attendance: 25,044; Referee: Mark Geiger

=== MLS Cup Playoffs ===
==== Wild Card Round ====
October 26, 2011 Wild Card	Dallas	0–2	New York	Frisco, Texas
21:00	Ihemelu (yellow card) 31'; Hernández (yellow card) 50'	Report; Live TV: FSC	Ream (yellow card) 27'; Lindpere 61'; Solli (red card) 79'; Henry 90+8'	Stadium: Pizza Hut Park; Attendance: 10,017; Referee: Ricardo Salazar

==== Conference Semi-finals ====
October 30, 2011 First Leg	New York	0–1	Los Angeles	Harrison, New Jersey
15:00	Henry (yellow card) 43'; Márquez (red card) 90+5'	Report; Live TV: ESPN2	Magee 15'; Franklin (yellow card) 39'; Juninho (red card) 90+5'	Stadium: Red Bull Arena; Attendance: 22,663; Referee: Alex Prus

November 3, 2011 Second Leg	Los Angeles	2–1 (3–1 agg.)	New York	Carson, California
23:00	Magee 42'; Donovan (yellow card) 45+1' (goal) 75' (pen.)	Report; Live TV: ESPN2	Rodgers 4' (yellow card) 5'; Henry (yellow card) 61'; Solli (yellow card) 81'	Stadium: The Home Depot Center; Attendance: 20,000; Referee: Hilario Grajeda

=== Friendlies ===
May 11, 2011	Montreal (Canada)	1–0	(United States) New York	Montreal, Quebec
19:30 EDT	Gerba 37'; Hatchi (yellow card) 42'	Report	Hot (yellow card) 82'	Stadium: Saputo Stadium; Attendance: 12,568; Referee: Geoff Gamble

=== 2011 Emirates Cup ===
July 30, 2011 Day 1	New York (United States)	1–0	(France) Paris Saint-Germain	London, England
09:00 EDT	Lindpere 27'; Richards (yellow card) 57'	Report		Stadium: Emirates Stadium

July 31, 2011 Day 2	Arsenal (England)	1–1	(United States) New York	London, England
11:20 EDT	v. Persie 42'	Report	84' (o.g.) Bartley	Stadium: Emirates Stadium

=== U.S. Open Cup ===
June 28, 2011 Third Round	New York	2–1	FC New York	Harrison, New Jersey
20:00 EST	Ream (yellow card) 38'; Hertzog 58'; Rooney 65'	Report	(yellow card) 34' Aquino; 56' Morrison; (yellow card) 60' Smith	Stadium: Red Bull Arena; Attendance: 2,074; Referee: Jose Carlos Rivero

July 12, 2011 Quarterfinal	Chicago	4–0	New York	Bridgeview, Illinois
18:00 EST	Oduro 7'; Cuesta 49'; Barouch 52', 69' (yellow card) 59'	Report	(yellow card) 85' Kassel; (yellow card) 87' Hot	Stadium: Toyota Park; Attendance: 1,500; Referee: Hilario Grajeda

== MLS Reserve League ==
Kickoff times are in EDT.

=== Pre-season ===
February 23, 2011	Chicago Reserves	4–2	New York Reserves	Fort Lauderdale, Florida
11:00	Barouch 2' (pen.) 30', 42', 90+'	(Report)	Rooney 9'; Hertzog 68' (pen.)	Stadium: Lockhart Stadium; Attendance: Closed Door; Referee: Michael Kennedy

March 4, 2011 Desert Cup	FC Tucson	1–3	New York Reserves	Tucson, Arizona
22:00	Guano 62'; Hohn (yellow card) 50'	(Report)	Hertzog 19', 53' (pen.) da Luz 68'	Stadium: Hi Corbett Field; Attendance: 2,560

March 7, 2011	Dallas	4–0	New York Reserves	Casa Grande, Arizona
15:45	Chávez 17', 53'; Galindo 57'; Avila 72'	(Report)		Stadium: Grande Sports World; Referee: Silviu Petrescu

=== Friendlies ===
April 3, 2011 Friendly 1	New York Reserves	3–1	University of Virginia	Montclair, New Jersey
11:00 EST	Hertzog 4' (pen.); Rodgers 34' (pen.) 44'	(Report)	Jumper 41'	Stadium: MSU Soccer Park

April 30, 2011 Friendly 2	New York Reserves	0–1	West Virginia University	Newark, New Jersey
11:00		(Report)	Sebele 23'	Stadium: Lubetkin Field

August 28, 2011 Friendly 3	New York Reserves	v	Penn State University	Montclair, New Jersey
				Stadium: MSU Soccer Park

=== Season ===
April 10, 2011 Reserve 1	Philadelphia Reserves	2–1	New York Reserves	Wallingford, Pennsylvania
10:00	McInerney 50' (yellow card) 72'; Agorsor 81'	Report	Kassel (yellow card) 50'; Rooney (yellow card) 39' (goal) 52'	Stadium: Chester Park

May 30, 2011 Reserve 2	New York Reserves	1–6	Columbus Reserves	Montclair, New Jersey
11:00	Paullo 19'; Kassel (yellow card) 30'; Hot (yellow card) 46'	Report	Grossman 20'; Meram 26'; Rusmir (yellow card) 45'; Anor 45', 59'; Davis 82', 85'	Stadium: MSU Soccer Park

June 11, 2011 Reserve 3	New York Reserves	0–2	New England Reserves	Montclair, New Jersey
10:00		Report	Koger 1' (yellow card) 53'; Coria (yellow card) 50'; Schilawski 66'	Stadium: MSU Soccer Park; Referee: Juan Guzman

August 15, 2011 Reserve 4	New York Reserves	2–1	Philadelphia Reserves	Montclair, New Jersey
15:00	Arteaga 48', 54'	Report	Torres 18'	Stadium: MSU Soccer Park

August 21, 2011 Reserve 5	New England Reserves	0–2	New York Reserves	Foxborough, Massachusetts
10:00		Report	Mendes 32'; Hertzog 49'	Stadium: Gillette Stadium; Referee: Jason Pelletier

October 1, 2011 Reserve 6	Toronto Reserves	3–1	New York Reserves	Toronto, Ontario
10:00	Makubuya 6'; Vukovic 10'; Vukovic 32'	Report	49' Nikocevic	Stadium: BMO Field; Referee: John Oliva

October 6, 2011 Reserve 7	New York Reserves	1–1	D.C. Reserves	Montclair, New Jersey
15:00	Hertzog 85'	Report	55' C. Najar	Stadium: MSU Soccer Park; Referee: Ryan dos Reis

October 10, 2011 Reserve 8	Columbus Reserves	3–0	New York Reserves	Columbus, Ohio
11:00	Meram 16'; Grossman 42'; Owoeri 85'	Report		Stadium: Crew Stadium; Referee: Sandip Basu

November 10, 2011 Reserve 9	D.C. Reserves	2–2	New York Reserves	Washington, D.C.
11:00	Barklage 8'; McDonald 38'	Report	Rooney 32' (pen.); Borrajo 86'	Stadium: RFK Training Field; Attendance: 77

TBD Reserve 10	New York Reserves	v	Toronto Reserves	Montclair, New Jersey
--:--				Stadium: MSU Soccer Park

== Recognition ==
=== MLS Player of the Week ===
Week	Player	Week's Statline
5	(England) Luke Rodgers	2G (2', 15'), Assist
16	(Estonia) Joel Lindpere	2G (7', 85')

=== MLS Goal of the Week ===
Week	Player	Goal	Report
1	(United States) Juan Agudelo	70'	Agudelo GOTW
6	(United States) Juan Agudelo	90+'	Agudelo GOTW
8	(France) Thierry Henry	4'	Henry GOTW

=== MLS Save of the Week ===
Week	Player	Save	Report
8	(United States) Tim Ream	43'	Ream SOTW
13	(Canada) Greg Sutton	59'	Sutton SOTW
14	(Finland) Teemu Tainio	57'	Tainio SOTW

=== MLS All-Stars 2011 ===
Position	Player	Notes
DF	(United States) Tim Ream	First XI
DF	(Mexico) Rafael Marquez	First XI
FW	(France) Thierry Henry	First XI
FW	(United States) Juan Agudelo	Commissioner's Pick
MF	(Estonia) Joel Lindpere	Inactive Roster

== Miscellany ==
=== Allocation ranking ===
New York did not use its spot in the MLS Allocation Ranking during the 2011 season. The allocation ranking is the mechanism used to determine which MLS club has first priority to acquire a U.S. National Team player who signs with MLS after playing abroad, or a former MLS player who returns to the league after having gone to a club abroad for a transfer fee. A ranking can be traded, provided that part of the compensation received in return is another club's ranking.

=== International roster spots ===
It is believed that New York has 12 international roster spots. Each club in Major League Soccer is allocated 8 international roster spots, which can be traded. New York acquired its first additional spot from San Jose Earthquakes on March 2, 2009. Press reports did not indicate if or when this roster spot was to revert to San Jose. New York acquired a second additional spot from Houston Dynamo on March 17, 2009. It is not known if or when this roster spot is to revert to Houston. The club also acquired a spot from Colorado Rapids on September 14, 2010, in the Macoumba Kandji trade. The trade of this spot was not included in the press release and it is not known when this spot reverts to Colorado. The club acquired a fourth additional international spot from D.C. United on July 16, 2011. This spot will return to D.C. after the 2011 season.

There is no limit on the number of international slots on each club's roster. The remaining roster slots must belong to domestic players. For clubs based in the United States, a domestic player is either a U.S. citizen, a permanent resident (green card holder) or the holder of other special status (e.g., refugee or asylum status).

=== Future draft pick trades ===
Future picks acquired: None.
Future picks traded: 2012 SuperDraft Round 1 pick traded to Toronto FC; 2012 Supplemental Draft Round 1 pick traded to Houston Dynamo; 2013 SuperDraft Round 2 pick traded to Sporting Kansas City.
