= 2026 Charlotte FC season =

Season of an American soccer team

Charlotte FC
2026 season
- Sporting director: Zoran Krneta
- Head coach: Dean Smith
- Stadium: Bank of America Stadium
Home colors	Away colors	Third colors

The 2026 Charlotte FC season is the team's fifth season in Major League Soccer (MLS), the top flight of professional club soccer in the United States. The team, based in Charlotte, North Carolina, was established in 2019 and made their debut in the 2022 season. The 2026 season will be the third for Charlotte FC under English head coach Dean Smith, who was hired in December 2023 as the team's third manager.

== Squad information ==
As of August 15, 2026

Note: Flags indicate national team as defined under FIFA eligibility rules; some limited exceptions apply. Players may hold more than one non-FIFA nationality.

No.	Pos.	Nation	Player
1	GK	CRO	Kristijan Kahlina
3	DF	USA	Tim Ream
4	DF	USA	Andrew Privett
7	FW	AUS	Archie Goodwin
8	MF	ENG	Ashley Westwood (captain)
9	FW	ISR	Idan Toklomati
10	MF	FRA	Allan Saint-Maximin (DP)
11	FW	ISR	Liel Abada (DP)
13	MF	USA	Brandt Bronico
14	DF	ENG	Nathan Byrne
15	DF	ENG	Harry Toffolo
16	MF	ESP	Pep Biel
17	MF	USA	Luca de la Torre

No.	Pos.	Nation	Player
20	MF	MLI	Baye Coulibaly
21	GK	USA	Tyler Miller
22	DF	USA	Henry Kessler
23	DF	AUT	David Schnegg
24	DF	USA	Mikah Thomas
25	FW	ENG	Tyger Smalls
27	FW	USA	Nimfasha Berchimas (HG)
28	MF	FRA	Djibril Diani
34	DF	USA	Andrew Johnson (soccer)
35	DF	USA	Will Cleary
37	FW	BEN	Rodolfo Aloko
39	DF	USA	Jack Neeley
42	GK	USA	Isaac Walker
44	DF	GHA	Morrison Agyemang
48	MF	USA	Aron John

=== Out on loan ===
Note: Flags indicate national team as defined under FIFA eligibility rules; some limited exceptions apply. Players may hold more than one non-FIFA nationality.

No.	Pos.	Nation	Player
26	GK	USA	Chituru Odunze (on loan to Phoenix Rising)
44	MF	SRB	Nikola Petković (on loan to Seattle Sounders FC)
41	FW	USA	Brian Romero (on loan to Crown Legacy FC)

== Coaching staff ==
As of January 2026

Technical staff
Head coach	Dean Smith
Associate head coach	Miles Joseph
Assistant coach	Gary Dicker
Sporting director	Zoran Krneta
Head of goalkeeping	Aron Hyde
Head video coach	Rohan Sachdev

=== Player movement ===
==== Transfers In ====
Pos.	Player	Transferred from	Fee/notes	Date
MF	(Spain) Pep Biel	(Greece) Olympiacos	Transfer	January 1, 2026
MF	(United States) Luca de la Torre	(Spain) Celta Vigo	Transfer	January 1, 2026
DF	(Austria) David Schnegg	(United States) D.C. United	Waivers	January 15, 2026
GK	(United States) Tyler Miller	(England) Bolton Wanderers	Transfer	January 20, 2026
DF	(United States) Henry Kessler	(United States) St. Louis City SC	Free agent	January 29, 2026
GK	(United States) Isaac Walker	(United States) Crown Legacy FC	Transfer	February 6, 2026
DF	(United States) Morrison Agyemang	(United States) Crown Legacy FC	Transfer	February 20, 2026
FW	(Benin) Rodolfo Aloko	(United States) Crown Legacy FC	Transfer	April 10, 2026
MF	(France) Allan Saint-Maximin	(France) RC Lens	Free	July 13, 2026
FW	(United States) Nathan Richmond	(United States) Crown Legacy FC	Transfer	September 12, 2026

==== Transfers Out ====
Pos.	Player	Transferred to	Fee/notes	Date
GK	(United States) Drake Callender	(United States) Minnesota United FC	Transfer	January 1, 2026
DF	(New Zealand) Bill Tuiloma	(New Zealand) Wellington Phoenix	Free	January 8, 2026
FW	(United States) Nick Scardina	(United States) Rhode Island FC	Free	January 12, 2026
DF	(United States) Jahlane Forbes	(United States) Las Vegas Lights FC	Free	January 20, 2026
MF	(Colombia) Kerwin Vargas	(Brazil) Club Athletico Paranaense	Transfer	July 31, 2026

==== Loans Out ====
Pos.	Player	Loaned to	Date
MF	(Serbia) Nikola Petković	(United States) Seattle Sounders FC	January 8, 2026
GK	(United States) Chituru Odunze	(United States) Phoenix Rising FC	February 6, 2026

== Draft picks ==
=== MLS Re-Entry Draft picks ===
2024 Charlotte FC Re-Entry Picks
Round	Selection	Player	Position	Team	Notes
1 (Stage 1)	22	PASS			
2 (Stage 2)	22	PASS			

=== MLS SuperDraft picks ===
2025 Charlotte FC Picks
Round	Pick	Player	Position	College
1	22	(United States) Will Cleary	MF	Stanford Cardinal
2	52	(United States) Luke Adams	DF	Tulsa Golden Hurricane
3	82	(Trinidad and Tobago) Jahiem Wickam	GK	South Florida Bulls

== Competitions ==
Win Draw Loss

All matches are in Eastern Time.

=== Preseason ===
January 23	Charlotte FC	3–1	Charleston Battery
	Toklomati 48'; Vargas 59'; Uchegbu 64'	Report	Privett 80' (o.g.)

January 31	Sporting Kansas City	0–1	Charlotte FC
		Report	Biel 87'

February 7 Coachella Valley Invitational	San Jose Earthquakes	1–0	Charlotte FC	Indio, California
	Leroux 41'	Report		Stadium: Empire Polo Club

February 14 Coachella Valley Invitational	Charlotte FC	2–1	Minnesota United FC	Indio, California
	Toklomati 36', 53'	Report	Hlongwane 38'	Stadium: Empire Polo Club

=== Overview ===
Competition	First match	Last match	Starting round	Final position	Record							
Competition	First match	Last match	Starting round	Final position	Pld	W	D	L	GF	GA	GD	Win %
Major League Soccer	February 21, 2026	November 7, 2026	Matchday 1	TBD	30	13	8	9	53	45	+8	43.33
MLS Cup playoffs	TBD	TBD	TBD	TBD	0	0	0	0	0	0	+0	—
Leagues Cup	August 4, 2026	August 11, 2026	League Phase	League Phase	3	2	0	1	5	1	+4	66.67
U.S. Open Cup	April 15, 2026	April 28, 2026	Round of 32	Round of 16	2	1	0	1	6	2	+4	50.00
Total					35	16	8	11	64	48	+16	45.71

Last updated: October 17, 2026
Source: Competitions

=== Major League Soccer (MLS) ===
==== Standings ====
MLS Eastern Conference table (2026)
Pos	Team	Pld	W	L	T	GF	GA	GD	Pts	Qualification
3	New England Revolution	34	18	12	4	55	47	+8	58	Qualification for round one
4	Chicago Fire FC	34	16	11	7	64	54	+10	55	Qualification for round one
5	Charlotte FC	34	15	10	9	66	51	+15	54	Qualification for round one
6	Philadelphia Union	34	14	12	8	66	52	+14	50	Qualification for round one
7	Columbus Crew	34	14	15	5	59	52	+7	47	Qualification for round one

Source: MLS
Rules for classification: 1) points; 2) total wins; 3) total goal differential; 4) total goals scored; 5) fewer disciplinary points; 6) away goal differential; 7) away goals scored; 8) home goals differential; 9) home goals scored; 10) coin toss (2 clubs tied) or drawing of lots (≥3 clubs tied)

Overall MLS standings table
Pos	Team	Pld	W	L	T	GF	GA	GD	Pts	Qualification
5	FC Dallas	34	16	8	10	62	51	+11	58	
6	Chicago Fire FC	34	16	11	7	64	54	+10	55	
7	Charlotte FC	34	15	10	9	66	51	+15	54	
8	St. Louis City SC (U)	34	15	10	9	59	48	+11	54	Qualification for the CONCACAF Champions Cup round one (Note: As winners of U.S. Open Cup)
9	San Jose Earthquakes	34	14	10	10	57	51	+6	52	

Source: MLS
Rules for classification: 1) points; 2) total wins; 3) total goal differential; 4) total goals scored; 5) fewer disciplinary points; 6) away goal differential; 7) away goals scored; 8) home goals differential; 9) home goals scored; 10) coin toss (2 clubs tied) or drawing of lots (≥3 clubs tied)
(U) U.S. Open Cup winners

==== Results summary ====
Overall								Home						Away					
Pld	Pts	W	L	T	GF	GA	GD	W	L	T	GF	GA	GD	W	L	T	GF	GA	GD
34	54	15	10	9	66	51	+15	10	4	4	37	19	+18	5	6	5	29	32	−3

Last updated: Complete
Source: MLS Results
Pld = Matches played; Pts = Points; W = Matches won; T = Matches tied; L = Matches lost; GF = Goals for; GA = Goals against; GD = Goal difference

==== Results by round ====
Round	1	2	3	4	5	6	7	8	9	10	11	12	13	14	15	16	17	18	19	20	21	22	23	24	25	26	27	28	29	30	31	32	33	34
Stadium	A	A	H	H	H	H	H	A	A	A	A	H	H	H	H	H	A	A	H	A	H	A	H	A	A	A	H	H	A	A	A	H	H	A
Result	D	L	W	D	W	W	L	W	L	L	L	D	L	W	W	D	W	L	W	D	W	W	D	W	D	W	L	W	L	D	L	W	W	D
Points	1	1	4	5	8	11	11	14	14	14	14	15	15	18	21	22	25	25	28	29	32	35	36	39	40	43	43	46	46	47	47	50	53	54
Position (East)	5	9	6	6	4	3	5	3	5	5	7	8	9	7	6	7	6	7	5	6	5	5	5	5	4	4	4	5	5	5	5	5	5	5

Source: Match reports
A = Away; H = Home; N = Neutral; W = Win; D = Draw; L = Loss; = Conference leader; = Playoffs berth; = Wild card berth

=== Match results ===
Win Draw Loss Void Postponed

February 21 1	St. Louis City SC	1–1	Charlotte FC	St. Louis, Missouri
2:30 pm EST	Baumgartl (yellow card) 40'; Hartel 60'; Orozco (yellow card) 66'	Report	Privett (yellow card) 7'; Zaha (yellow card) 71'; Biel 73'	Stadium: Energizer Park; Attendance: 22,423; Referee: Ismail Elfath

February 28 2	LA Galaxy	3–0	Charlotte FC	Carson, California
10:30 pm EST	Sanabria 8', (yellow card) 90+2'; Klauss 11', 13'; Ramos Jr. (yellow card) 89'	Report	Zaha (yellow card) 30'; Toklomati (yellow card) 43'; Agyemang (yellow card) 74'; Westwood (yellow card) 80'	Stadium: Dignity Health Sports Park; Attendance: 20,205; Referee: Joe Dickerson

March 7 3	Charlotte FC	3–1	Austin FC	Charlotte, North Carolina
7:30 pm EST	Zaha (yellow card) 18'; Abada (yellow card) 64'	Report	Biro (red card) 25'; Agyemang 31' (o.g.); Uzuni (yellow card) 58'	Stadium: Bank of America Stadium; Attendance: 35,611; Referee: Rosendo Mendoza

March 14 4	Charlotte FC	0–0	Inter Miami CF	Charlotte, North Carolina
7:30 pm EDT	Zaha (yellow card) 32'; Westwood (yellow card) 38'; Toffolo (yellow card) 77'	Report	Silvetti (yellow card) 6'; Segovia (yellow card) 75'	Stadium: Bank of America Stadium; Attendance: 34,780; Referee: Guido Gonzales Jr.

March 21 5	Charlotte FC	6–1	New York Red Bulls	Charlotte, North Carolina
7:30 pm EDT	Toklomati 14'; Diani (yellow card) 19'; Vargas 46'; Biel 54'; Zaha 68'; Goodwin 77', 90+3'	Report	Berggren (red card) 53'; Donkor (yellow card) 77'; Hall 81'	Stadium: Bank of America Stadium; Attendance: 27,166; Referee: Allen Chapman

April 4 6	Charlotte FC	2–1	Philadelphia Union	Charlotte, North Carolina
7:30 pm EDT	Diani (yellow card) 19'; Westwood 30'; Zaha (yellow card) 42', (goal) 80'; Agyemang (yellow card) 83'; Kahlina (yellow card) 87'	Report	Westfield (yellow card) 12'; Damiani (yellow card) 45+2'; Harriel (yellow card) 76'; Jean Jacques 78'; C. Sullivan (yellow card) 90+1'	Stadium: Bank of America Stadium; Attendance: 25,865; Referee: Drew Fischer

April 11 7	Charlotte FC	1–2	Nashville SC	Charlotte, North Carolina
7:30 pm EDT	Goodwin 90' (pen.)	Report	Tagseth 14'; Muyl (yellow card) 35'; Yazbek 62'; Lovitz (yellow card) 64'; Mukhtar (yellow card) 90+2'	Stadium: Bank of America Stadium; Attendance: 26,012; Referee: Rubiel Vazquez

April 18 8	New York City FC	1–2	Charlotte FC	New York, New York
7:30 pm EDT	Gustavo (yellow card) 17'; Parks (yellow card) 85'; Fernández 90+3'	Report	Bronico (yellow card) 3'; Toklomati 54'; Privett (yellow card) 68'; Byrne (yellow card) 81'; Kahlina (yellow card) 83'; Vargas 90'	Stadium: Citi Field; Attendance: 20,997; Referee: Tori Penso

April 22 9	Orlando City SC	4–1	Charlotte FC	Orlando, Florida
7:30 pm EDT	Otávio 21', (yellow card) 41'; Angulo (yellow card) 24'; M. Ojeda (yellow card) 45+3', (goal) 49', 61'; Tiago (yellow card) 66'; Gómez (yellow card) 79', (goal) 87'	Report	Agyemang 33'; Westwood (yellow card) 41'; Toffolo (yellow card) 59'	Stadium: Inter&Co Stadium; Attendance: 16,089; Referee: Filip Dujic

April 25 10	Nashville SC	4–2	Charlotte FC	Nashville, Tennessee
8:30 pm EDT	Mukhtar 19'; Qasem 25'; Surridge 60', 74'; Muyl (yellow card) 78'; Schwake (yellow card) 87'	Report	Agyemang 42'; Biel 68'; Schnegg (yellow card) 85'	Stadium: Geodis Park; Attendance: 30,109; Referee: Joe Dickerson

May 2 11	New England Revolution	1–0	Charlotte FC	Foxborough, Massachusetts
7:30 pm EDT	Sands (yellow card) 51'; Fofana (yellow card) 60'; Gil 90+7' (pen.), (yellow card) 90+8'	Report	Byrne (yellow card) 30'; Schnegg (yellow card) 57'; Zaha (yellow card) 60'; Westwood (yellow card) 82'	Stadium: Gillette Stadium; Attendance: 22,831; Referee: Pierre-Luc Lauziere

May 9 12	Charlotte FC	2–2	FC Cincinnati	Charlotte, North Carolina
7:30 pm EDT	Toklomati 51'; Biel 52'; Westwood (yellow card) 54'	Report	Valenzuela (yellow card) 26'; Denkey 36'; Evander 43', (yellow card) 77'; Gidi (yellow card) 62'; Nwobodo (yellow card) 90'	Stadium: Bank of America Stadium; Attendance: 26,252; Referee: Ismail Elfath

May 13 13	Charlotte FC	0–1	New York City FC	Charlotte, North Carolina
7:00 pm EDT	Ojeda (yellow card) 33'; Diani (yellow card) 36'; Biel (yellow card) 38'; Zaha (yellow card) 71'; Goodwin (yellow card) 87'	Report	Fernández 8', (yellow card) 29'; Wolf (yellow card) 40'; Jones (yellow card) 84'; Gustavo (yellow card) 90+4'	Stadium: Bank of America Stadium; Attendance: 23,903; Referee: Jon Freemon

May 16 14	Charlotte FC	3–1	Toronto FC	Charlotte, North Carolina
7:30 pm EDT	Zaha 19'; Schnegg 35'; Biel (yellow card) 50', (goal) 84' (pen.); Westwood (yellow card) 90+2'	Report	Etienne Jr. 22'; Henry (yellow card) 54'; Osorio (yellow card) 84'	Stadium: Bank of America Stadium; Attendance: 28,158; Referee: Allen Chapman

May 23 15	Charlotte FC	1–0	New England Revolution	Charlotte, North Carolina
7:30 pm EDT	Schnegg (yellow card) 13' (yellow-red card) 58'; Toklomati 16'	Report	Miller (yellow card) 27'; Fofana (yellow card) 62'; Kohler (yellow card) 65'; Ceballos (yellow card) 68'	Stadium: Bank of America Stadium; Attendance: 24,640; Referee: Fotis Bazakos

July 22 16	Charlotte FC	2–2	Atlanta United FC	Charlotte, North Carolina
8:00 pm EDT	Vargas 16'; Abada 45'; Byrne (yellow card) 79'	Report	Reilly (yellow card) 22'; Miranchuk (yellow card) 48'; Báez 57'; Almirón 76'; Jacob (yellow card) 90+10'	Stadium: Bank of America Stadium; Attendance: 28,077; Referee: Sergii Boiko

July 25 17	New York Red Bulls	0–2	Charlotte FC	Harrison, New Jersey
7:30 pm EDT	Ruvalcaba (yellow card) 56'; Mehmeti (yellow card) 76' (red card) 90+3'; Valencia (yellow card) 85'; Che (yellow card) 90+1'	Report	Biel 7'; Westwood 12'; Abada (yellow card) 47'	Stadium: Sports Illustrated Stadium; Attendance: 22,087; Referee: Rosendo Mendoza

August 1 18	Chicago Fire FC	2–1	Charlotte FC	Chicago, Illinois
8:30 pm EDT	Saletros (yellow card) 10'; Lewandowski 20', 68'; Waterman (yellow card) 59'	Report	Biel 18'	Stadium: Soldier Field; Attendance: 32,183; Referee: Jon Freemon

August 15 19	Charlotte FC	3–1	Columbus Crew	Charlotte, North Carolina
7:30 pm EDT	Bronico 1'; Abada 9' (pen.); Schnegg (yellow card) 39'; Kessler (yellow card) 60'; Biel 73'; Westwood (yellow card) 89'	Report	Adams 41'	Stadium: Bank of America Stadium; Attendance: 25,470; Referee: Filip Dujic

August 19 20	Toronto FC	3–3	Charlotte FC	Toronto, Ontario
7:30 pm EDT	Cimermancic 14'; Zimmerman (red card); Sallói 77'; Pereira (yellow card) 85'; Dorsch 90'	Report	Aloko 8'; Toklomati 20'; Kessler 58'	Stadium: BMO Field; Attendance: 19,909; Referee: Alexis Da Silva

August 22 21	Charlotte FC	3–1	D.C. United	Charlotte, North Carolina
7:30 pm EDT	Schnegg 64'; Cleary 66'; Biel 77', (yellow card) 90+4'; Smalls (yellow card) 85'	Report	Kurokawa (yellow card) 34'; Hefti (yellow card) 44'; Munteanu 55'; Peglow (yellow card) 68'	Stadium: Bank of America Stadium; Attendance: 28,257; Referee: Elijio Arreguin

August 29 22	Atlanta United FC	0–2	Charlotte FC	Atlanta, Georgia
7:30 pm EDT	Gill (yellow card) 85'	Report	Toklomati 22'; Diani (yellow card) 45+3'; Abada 48'	Stadium: Mercedes-Benz Stadium; Attendance: 40,385; Referee: Victor Rivas

September 5 23	Charlotte FC	0–0	Houston Dynamo FC	Charlotte, North Carolina
7:30 pm EDT	Ream (yellow card) 45+3'; Diani (yellow card) 49'; Westwood (yellow card) 71' (red card) 71'; Saint-Maximin (yellow card) 83'	Report	Felipe Andrade (yellow card) 8'; Resch (yellow card) 66'; Artur (yellow card) 78'; Guilherme (yellow card) 90+3'	Stadium: Bank of America Stadium; Attendance: 25,450; Referee: Guido Gonzales Jr.

September 9 24	CF Montréal	1–2	Charlotte FC	Montreal, Quebec
7:30 pm EDT	Ríos 34'; Loturi (yellow card) 45+4'; Longstaff (yellow card) 81'	Report	Abada 37'; Schnegg (yellow card) 67'; Toklomati 81'	Stadium: Saputo Stadium; Attendance: 12,324; Referee: Rubiel Vazquez

September 12 25	FC Cincinnati	3–3	Charlotte FC	Cincinnati, Ohio
7:30 pm EDT	Bucha 2'; Denkey 51', 90+1'; Gidi (yellow card) 76'; Dem (yellow card) 81'	Report	Abada 7'; Biel 17' (pen.); Toklomati 55'; Aloko (yellow card) 83'	Stadium: TQL Stadium; Attendance: 25,513; Referee: Pierre-Luc Lauziere

September 19 26	D.C. United	1–2	Charlotte FC	Washington, D.C.
7:30 pm EDT	Peglow (yellow card) 3'; Bartlett 47'; Dozzell (yellow card) 57'	Report	Westwood 22', (yellow card) 82'; Schnegg (yellow card) 46'; Saint-Maximin 71'	Stadium: Audi Field; Attendance: 15,073; Referee: Armando Villarreal

September 26 27	Charlotte FC	0–1	Chicago Fire FC	Charlotte, North Carolina
7:30 pm EDT	Diani (yellow card) 34'; Saint-Maximin (yellow card) 38'; Biel (yellow card) 74'; Westwood (yellow card) 82'; Ream (yellow card) 90+8'	Report	Oregel (yellow card) 23'; Poreba (yellow card) 80'; Gomez 58'	Stadium: Bank of America Stadium; Attendance: 31,011; Referee: Chris Penso

October 10 28	Charlotte FC	3–2	FC Dallas	Charlotte, North Carolina
7:30 pm EDT	Toklomati 70', 90+2'; Toffolo 74'; Agyemang (yellow card) 86'	Report	Farrington 22'; Musa 64'; Urhoghide (yellow card) 79'	Stadium: Bank of America Stadium; Attendance: 28,536; Referee: Drew Fischer

October 14 29	Columbus Crew	3–1	Charlotte FC	Columbus, Ohio
7:30 pm EDT	Méndez 28'; Zaroury 63'; Habroune 65'; Amundsen (yellow card) 69'; Schulte (yellow card) 72'	Report	Toklomati 17'	Stadium: ScottsMiracle-Gro Field; Attendance: 18,607; Referee: Timothy Ford

October 17 30	Philadelphia Union	2–2	Charlotte FC	Chester, Pennsylvania
2:30 pm EDT	Iloski 24' (pen.); Damiani 73'	Report	Saint-Maximin (yellow card) 19'; Agyemang (yellow card) 44'; Schnegg (yellow card) 45+1'; Aloko 48'; Toklomati 62'	Stadium: Subaru Park; Attendance: 18,551; Referee: Jon Freemon

October 24 31	Portland Timbers	3–2	Charlotte FC	Portland, Oregon
10:30 pm EDT	Lassiter 11', 40'; Izoita (yellow card) 17'; Aravena 90+6'	Report	Biel 3'; Byrne (yellow card) 45'; Toklomati 69'	Stadium: Providence Park; Attendance: 23,323; Referee: Rosendo Mendoza

October 28 32	Charlotte FC	4–0	CF Montréal	Charlotte, North Carolina
7:30 pm EDT	Toklomati 7'; Abada 67', 79', 83'	Report	Morales (yellow card) 64'; Pereira (yellow card) 86'; Herbers (yellow card) 90+2'	Stadium: Bank of America Stadium; Attendance: 24,448; Referee: Ricardo Fierro

October 31 33	Charlotte FC	4–0	Orlando City SC	Charlotte, North Carolina
1:00 pm EDT	Kessler 6'; Saint-Maximin 49', (red card) 89'; Westwood (yellow card) 61'; Doucouré 84'; Smalls (yellow card) 90+3'; Aloko 90+4'	Report	Nogueira (yellow card) 25'; Angulo (yellow card) 82'	Stadium: Bank of America Stadium; Attendance: 28,538; Referee: Victor Rivas

November 7 34	Inter Miami CF	3–3	Charlotte FC	Miami, Florida
4:00 pm EST	Segovia (yellow card) 9'; Fray 14'; Suárez 33'; de Paul 42'	Report	Abada 50', 55'; Schnegg (yellow card) 88'; Aloko 90+1'	Stadium: Nu Stadium; Attendance: 26,854; Referee: Rubiel Vazquez

=== MLS Cup playoffs ===
November 22 Round one match 1	Chicago Fire FC	v	Charlotte FC	Bridgeview, Illinois
6:30 pm EST				Stadium: SeatGeek Stadium

November 28 Round one match 2	Charlotte FC	v	Chicago Fire FC	Charlotte, North Carolina
12:30 pm EST				Stadium: Bank of America Stadium

December 2 Round one match 3	Chicago Fire FC	v	Charlotte FC	Bridgeview, Illinois
pm EST				Stadium: SeatGeek Stadium

=== U.S. Open Cup ===
April 15 Round of 32	Charlotte FC (North Carolina)	6–0	(North Carolina) Charlotte Independence	Matthews, North Carolina
7:30 pm EDT	Goodwin 45+1'; Kessler 60'; Berchimas 68'; Schnegg 73'; Vargas 86'; Coulibaly 89'	Report	Tasouris (red card) 23'; Nare (yellow card) 40'; Álvarez (yellow card) 56'	Stadium: Sportsplex at Matthews; Attendance: 3,684; Referee: Matthew Thompson

April 28 Round of 16	Charlotte FC (North Carolina)	0–2	(Georgia (U.S. state)) Atlanta United FC	Matthews, North Carolina
7:00 pm EDT	Vargas (yellow card) 90+2'	Report	Miranchuk 22'; Sanchez 71', (yellow card) 90'; Brennan (yellow card) 90+2'	Stadium: Sportsplex at Matthews; Attendance: 3,315; Referee: Sergii Boiko

=== Leagues Cup ===
August 4 1	Charlotte FC (United States)	3–0	(Mexico) UNAM	Charlotte, North Carolina
8:00 p.m. EDT	Cleary (yellow card) 13'; Bronico 27'; Goodwin 50'; Smalls 78' (pen.)	Report	Martínez (yellow card) 23'; Nathan (yellow card) 84'	Stadium: Bank of America Stadium; Attendance: 22,530; Referee: Rubiel Vazquez

August 7 2	Charlotte FC (United States)	2–0	(Mexico) Atlas	Charlotte, North Carolina
7:30 p.m. EDT	Westwood (yellow card) 39'; Aloko (yellow card) 41'; Abada 78'; Morrison (yellow card) 88'; Smalls 90+5'	Report	Ríos (yellow card) 22'; Ramírez (yellow card) 37'; Mmaee (yellow card) 71'	Stadium: Bank of America Stadium; Attendance: 15,579; Referee: Julio Luna

August 11 3	Charlotte FC (United States)	0–1	(Mexico) Pachuca	Charlotte, North Carolina
7:30 p.m. EDT	Byrne (yellow card) 62'	Report	Pizarro (yellow card) 88'; Bautista 90+1'; Rodríguez (yellow card) 90+3'	Stadium: Bank of America Stadium; Attendance: 15,561; Referee: Kwinsi Williams
