= 2011 MLS Draft =

2011 MLS Draft may refer to:

- 2011 MLS SuperDraft
- 2011 MLS Supplemental Draft
