= Tim Ream =

American soccer player (born 1987)

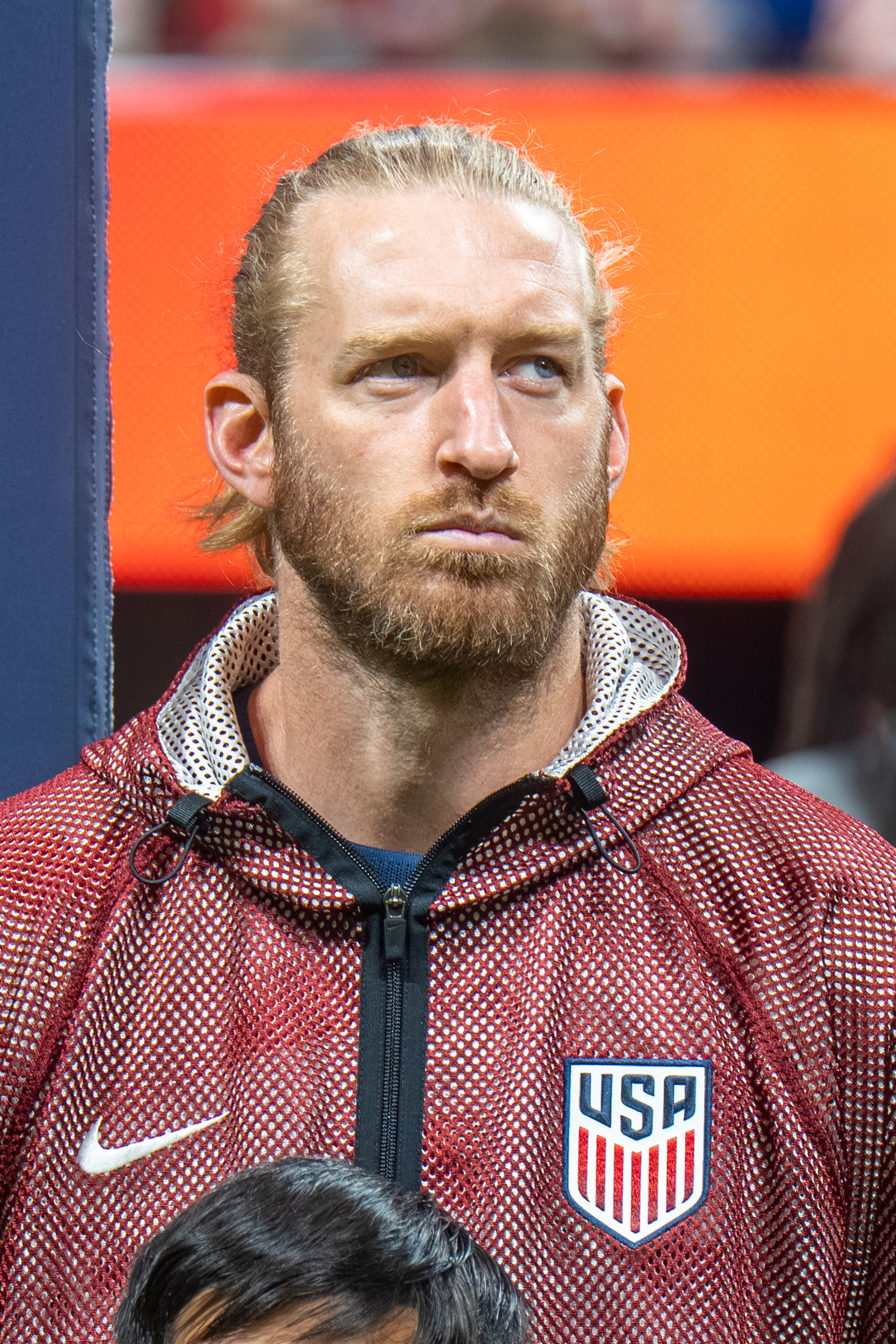
- Ream with the United States in 2026

Personal information
- Full name: Timothy Michael Ream
- Date of birth: October 5, 1987 (age 39)
- Place of birth: St. Louis, Missouri, U.S.
- Height: 6 ft 1 in (1.86 m)
- Positions: Center-back; left-back

Team information
- Current team: Charlotte FC
- Number: 3

Youth career
- 2003–2005: St. Louis Scott Gallagher

College career
Years	Team	Apps	(Gls)
2006–2009	Saint Louis University	82	(6)

Senior career*
Years	Team	Apps	(Gls)
2008–2009	Chicago Fire Premier	19	(6)
2010–2011	New York Red Bulls	58	(1)
2012–2015	Bolton Wanderers	114	(0)
2015–2024	Fulham	281	(5)
2024–	Charlotte FC	57	(1)

International career^{‡}
2010–2026	United States	86	(1)
Medal record
Representing United States
Men's soccer
CONCACAF Gold Cup
Runner-up	2011 United States
Runner-up	2019 United States
Runner-up	2025 Canada–United States
CONCACAF Nations League
Winner	2021 United States
Winner	2024 United States
CONCACAF Cup
Runner-up	2015 United States
- * Club domestic league appearances and goals as of November 15, 2026 ‡ National team caps and goals as of July 6, 2026

Timothy Michael Ream (born October 5, 1987) is an American professional soccer player who plays as a center-back or left-back for Major League Soccer club Charlotte FC.

== Youth and college soccer ==
Born in St. Louis, Missouri, Ream was a 2005 NSCAA All-Midwest Region selection with his high school, St. Dominic, and after finishing his career with 15 goals and a school-record 39 assists, was tabbed All-State, All-Conference and Class 2 Defensive Player of the Year in both 2004 and 2005, was a St. Louis Post-Dispatch All-Metro selection and garnered Archdiocesan Athletic Association Player of the Year honors following senior season. He helped lead St. Dominic to the 2004 Missouri Class 2 state title. Ream also played with academy club St. Louis Scott Gallagher, winning national championships in 2003 and 2004.

Ream attended Saint Louis University where he was a regular figure as a defender for the Saint Louis Billikens, earning NSCAA first-team All-Region and second-team All-Conference honors. During his college years Ream also played for Chicago Fire Premier in the USL Premier Development League.

== Professional career ==
=== New York Red Bulls ===
"He has a future. I probably shouldn't say too much, but Ream has a chance to be a national team player. He's a center back who is comfortable and calm in possession of the ball. He plays a good passing game, he's an excellent passer. A European-type center back who, I think, reminds me of Rio Ferdinand in the Premier League. Ream is strong tactically and never stressed, and of course he's good in the air. He has a top-class attitude and spirit."

— Red Bulls coach Hans Backe speaking about Tim Ream, March 17, 2010

Ream was drafted in the second round (18th overall) of the 2010 MLS SuperDraft by New York Red Bulls. His play during pre-season impressed many observers, including new coach Hans Backe who was pleased with his distribution and tactical awareness.

On March 20, 2010, Ream started and played the full 90 minutes for Red Bulls in a 3–1 victory against Santos FC, which was the first match played at the new Red Bull Arena. He made his professional debut on March 27, 2010, playing the full 90 in New York's opening game of the 2010 MLS season against Chicago Fire that ended in a 1–0 victory for New York. On September 11, 2010, he scored his first professional goal against the Colorado Rapids in a 3–1 win for New York Red Bulls. Ream ended his first professional season starting all 30 matches for New York and helped New York capture its second regular season Eastern Conference title. Upon the conclusion of the 2010 season, he was named the team's Defender of the Year, and he was one of three listed candidates for MLS Rookie of the Year. During Ream's second season in New York, he played and started in 28 of 34 matches during the regular season; he missed 6 matches largely due to international call-ups during the 2011 CONCACAF Gold Cup.

In December 2011, during the MLS off-season, Ream spent a short time training with both West Bromwich Albion and Bolton Wanderers with permission from the Red Bulls to maintain his fitness during the winter break. At the beginning of January 2012, Bolton made a transfer offer of £2.5m for him. Bolton had recently sold Gary Cahill to Chelsea, and needed to find a replacement. The bid was accepted and after personal terms were agreed he received a work permit on January 24.

=== Bolton Wanderers ===
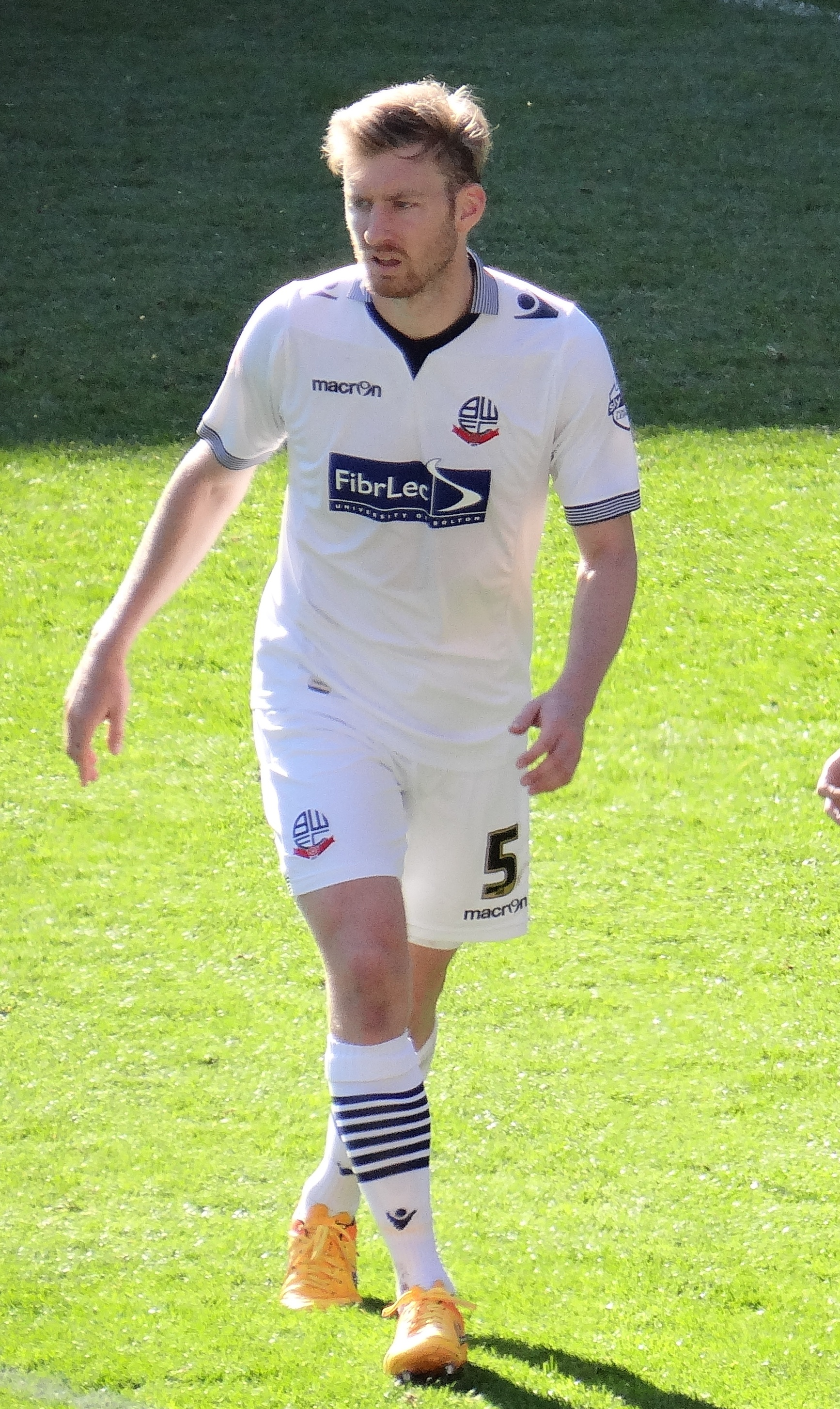
Ream playing for Bolton Wanderers in 2015

Bolton completed the signing of Ream on January 26, 2012, on a three-and-a-half-year contract. He canceled his honeymoon so that he could sign for Bolton. He was given the number 32 shirt and made his debut for the club in Bolton's 2–0 FA Cup win at Millwall on February 18. He made his Premier League debut the following weekend in Bolton's 3–0 defeat at Chelsea. On March 10, 2012, he assisted Darren Pratley's opening goal in a 2–1 win over Queens Park Rangers. He went on to appear ten games straight towards the end of the season, but was unable to help the club survive relegation in the Premier League.

For the start of the 2012–13 season, Ream was given the number 5 shirt, previously worn by Gary Cahill. He was given his first start of the 2012–13 season in a 2–0 loss against Burnley. However, he was sidelined from the first team, due to losing his starting place and was relegated to the substitutes bench. Despite this, Ream went on to make fifteen appearances.

Ahead of the 2013–14 season, Ream was linked with a move to Middlesbrough, a move that was denied by the club and Ream. After appearing the first three matches as an unused substitute, he started as defensive midfielder for four matches in September. In early February 2014, he was forced to wear a protective mask in Wanderers games after a collision with Queens Park Rangers striker Charlie Austin. Throughout the 2013–14 season, Ream played at left back and center back, where he established his partnership with Matt Mills and redeemed himself in the first team making 42 appearances. At the end of that season, he was voted the fans' player of the year and the club's player of the year.

Ahead of the 2014–15 season, on July 6, 2014, Ream signed a new three-year contract with Bolton that lasts until the summer of 2017. Over the course of the season, he made a total of 44 appearances, missing two matches, one as an unused substitute against Derby County on September 27, 2014 and one through injury. For a consecutive season, he was named as Bolton's player of the year.

Ahead of the 2015–16 season, Ream was linked with a move to Championship rivals Queens Park Rangers, who made a bid for him. However, the bid was rejected.

=== Fulham ===
On August 20, 2015, Ream was sold to Fulham, with whom he signed a four-year contract. The move had an undisclosed fee and an option to extend his stay by a further year. He made his Fulham debut on August 29, 2015, in a 3–1 win over Rotherham United, playing 90 minutes. He made 29 appearances for the club in his first season, partly due to international commitment and injuries. After initially playing as a center back, he was used at left back toward the end of the season, following the departure of James Husband.

He scored his first goal for the club in a 2–1 loss against Queens Park Rangers on October 1, 2016. Ream scored his first ever Premier League goal for Fulham on Boxing Day 2022 against Crystal Palace. On October 7, 2023, Ream made his 300th appearance for Fulham in a 3–1 win over Sheffield United. On December 29, 2023, Ream extended his contract with Fulham until the summer of 2025.

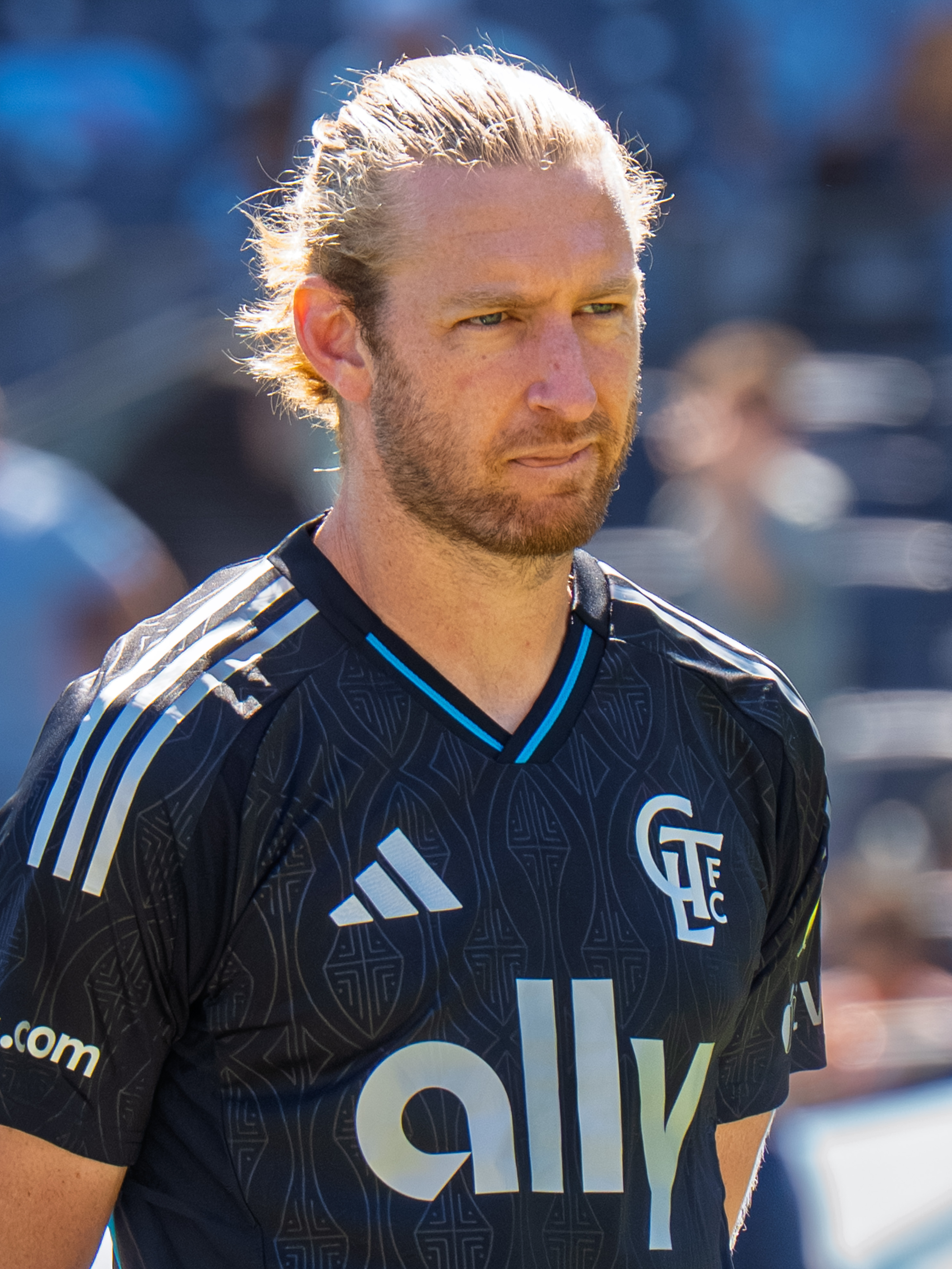
Ream with Charlotte FC in 2025

=== Charlotte FC ===
On August 7, 2024, Ream signed for Major League Soccer club Charlotte FC on a two-year contract with the option for a further twelve months.

== International career ==
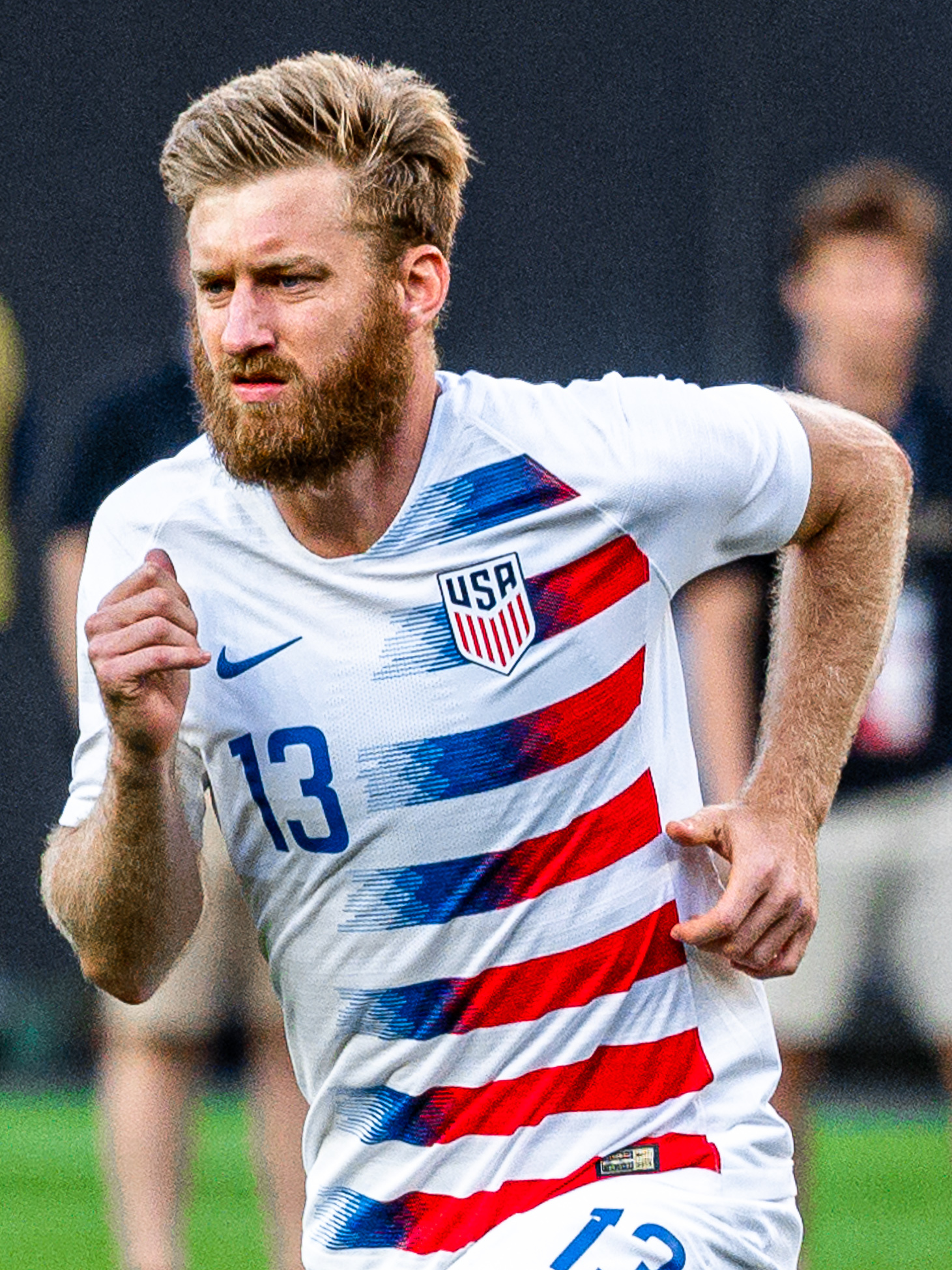
Ream with the United States at the 2019 CONCACAF Gold Cup.

On November 11, 2010, Ream was called up to the United States men's national soccer team for the first time as part of an 18-man roster for a match against South Africa on November 17 in Cape Town. He made his international debut that day, starting the match and played until the 67th minute before being replaced by Nat Borchers. The U.S. won 1–0 with the lone goal coming from fellow Red Bull teammate Juan Agudelo. On January 22, 2011, he earned his second international cap against Chile in a 1–1 draw. He played all 90 minutes at center back.

Ream started in their first game of the 2011 Gold Cup, a 2–0 win over Canada. He also started the second match against Panama, which the U.S. lost 2–1 for their first ever loss in Gold Cup group play. In the 34th minute, he committed a foul on Blas Pérez resulting in a penalty kick for Panama. The penalty was converted by Gabriel Gómez and became the match-winner. In the next match, against Guadeloupe, he was replaced by Eric Lichaj and did not play in the final four matches of the 2011 Gold Cup.

After a two-year absence, Ream was again called into the U.S. national team in 2013 appearing as an unused substitute against Bosnia and Herzegovina on August 14, 2013. On September 3, 2014, he played his first international match in three years, playing 45 minutes in a 1–0 win over Czech Republic.

Ream also was called up for the 2015 Gold Cup where he played all 90 minutes against the Haiti national team and helped preserve a 1–0 clean sheet.

On May 1, 2016, Ream was named in the 40-man preliminary squad for the Copa América Centenario held in the United States. On May 22, 2016, he scored his first international goal against Puerto Rico in a pre-tournament friendly at the Juan Ramón Loubriel Stadium in Bayamón, Puerto Rico. He was later cut from the final 23-man roster selected by coach Jürgen Klinsmann.

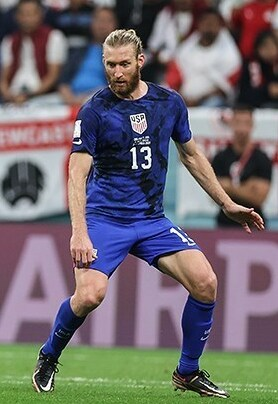
Ream playing for the United States at the 2022 FIFA World Cup.

On November 9, 2022, Ream was called up for the 2022 FIFA World Cup. Despite having made only one appearance during qualifying, he was selected to start the team's opening match of the tournament against Wales, making his World Cup debut at the age of 35. Ream retained his place in the center of defense for the following matches against England and Iran, with the U.S. recording two consecutive clean sheets for the first time since its tournament debut in 1930. He played the full match against the Netherlands in the Round of 16, as the U.S. was beaten 3–1 on December 3, 2022.

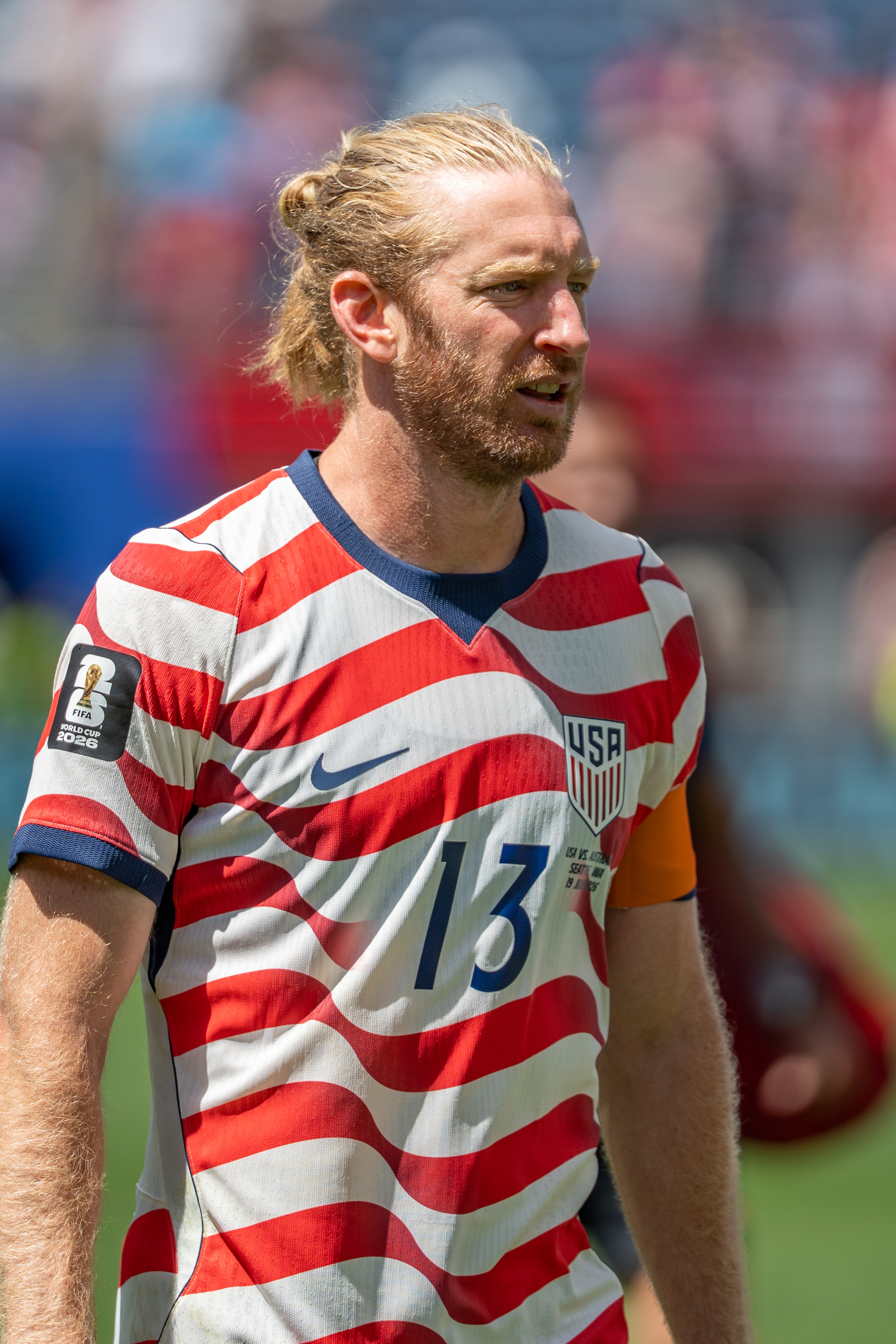
Ream with the United States at the 2026 FIFA World Cup

On May 26, 2026, Ream was selected in the 26-man squad for the 2026 FIFA World Cup. He was announced as the U.S. captain for the tournament. On June 12, 2026, Ream became the oldest player to feature for the United States at a World Cup, starting against Paraguay at 38 years and 250 days, surpassing Fernando Clavijo. On September 29, 2026, Ream announced his retirement from the national team.

== Personal life ==
In January 2012, Ream married his childhood sweetheart Kristen Sapienza, who is also a soccer player. Twenty-four hours after getting married, Ream postponed his honeymoon planned in Tahiti to undergo a move to Bolton Wanderers. Ream later stated in an interview with The Bolton News that he still made a right choice in postponing his honeymoon, adding: "You still have to make the right choices. I love my wife, but the beautiful game is of spiritual importance to me".

== Career statistics ==
=== Club ===
As of match played October 14, 2026

Appearances and goals by club, season and competition
Club	Season	League			National cup (Note: Includes U.S. Open Cup and FA Cup)		League cup (Note: Includes MLS Cup playoffs and EFL Cup)		Other		Total	
Club	Season	Division	Apps	Goals	Apps	Goals	Apps	Goals	Apps	Goals	Apps	Goals
New York Red Bulls	2010	Major League Soccer	30	1	1	0	2	0	—		33	1
New York Red Bulls	2011	Major League Soccer	28	0	1	0	3	0	—		32	0
New York Red Bulls	Total		58	1	2	0	5	0	—		65	1
Bolton Wanderers	2011–12	Premier League	13	0	1	0	0	0	—		14	0
Bolton Wanderers	2012–13	Championship	15	0	1	0	1	0	—		17	0
Bolton Wanderers	2013–14	Championship	42	0	2	0	1	0	—		45	0
Bolton Wanderers	2014–15	Championship	44	0	3	0	2	0	—		49	0
Bolton Wanderers	Total		114	0	7	0	4	0	—		125	0
Fulham	2015–16	Championship	29	0	1	0	2	0	—		32	0
Fulham	2016–17	Championship	34	1	3	0	3	0	2 (Note: Appearances in Championship play-offs)	0	42	1
Fulham	2017–18	Championship	44	1	1	0	0	0	3	0	48	1
Fulham	2018–19	Premier League	26	0	1	0	2	0	—		29	0
Fulham	2019–20	Championship	44	0	1	0	0	0	3	0	48	0
Fulham	2020–21	Premier League	7	0	2	0	1	0	—		10	0
Fulham	2021–22	Championship	46	1	1	0	0	0	—		47	1
Fulham	2022–23	Premier League	33	1	2	0	0	0	—		35	1
Fulham	2023–24	Premier League	18	1	1	0	2	0	—		21	1
Fulham	Total		281	5	13	0	10	0	8	0	312	5
Charlotte FC	2024	Major League Soccer	9	1	—		3	0	—		12	1
Charlotte FC	2025	Major League Soccer	27	0	2	0	3	0	2 (Note: Appearances in Leagues Cup)	0	34	0
Charlotte FC	2026	Major League Soccer	21	0	0	0	0	0	2	0	23	0
Charlotte FC	Total		57	1	2	0	6	0	4	0	69	1
Career total			510	7	24	0	25	0	12	0	571	7

=== International ===
As of match played July 6, 2026

Appearances and goals by national team and year
National team	Year	Apps	Goals
United States	2010	1	0
United States	2011	6	0
United States	2012	0	0
United States	2013	0	0
United States	2014	4	0
United States	2015	9	0
United States	2016	1	1
United States	2017	5	0
United States	2018	0	0
United States	2019	14	0
United States	2020	1	0
United States	2021	5	0
United States	2022	4	0
United States	2023	5	0
United States	2024	11	0
United States	2025	13	0
United States	2026	7	0
Total		86	1

Scores and results list the United States' goal tally first.

List of international goals scored by Tim Ream
No.	Date	Venue	Opponent	Score	Result	Competition
1	May 22, 2016	Juan Ramón Loubriel Stadium, Bayamón, Puerto Rico	Puerto Rico	1–0	3–1	Friendly

== Honors ==
Saint Louis Billikens

- Conference Tournament: 2009
- Conference Regular Season: 2006, 2007

Chicago Fire Premier

- USL PDL Midwest Division: 2008
- USL PDL Central Conference: 2009

New York Red Bulls

- Eastern Conference Regular Season: 2010

Fulham

- EFL Championship: 2021–22; play-offs: 2018, 2020

United States

- CONCACAF Nations League: 2019–20, 2023–24

Individual

- MLS SuperDraft: 2010
- New York Red Bulls Defender of the Year: 2010
- MLS Rookie of the Year Nomination: 2010
- Bolton Wanderers Player of the Year: 2013–14, 2014–15
- Fulham Player of the Year: 2017–18
- PFA Team of the Year: 2021–22 Championship
- MLS All-Star: 2026
