= Yannick Salmon =

Jamaican footballer (born 1990)

Personal information
- Date of birth: 7 April 1990 (age 36)
- Place of birth: Westbury, New York, United States
- Height: 1.83 m (6 ft 0 in)
- Position: Defender

Youth career
- 2007: Maryland Terrapins
- 2008–2010: Rutgers Scarlet Knights

Senior career*
Years	Team	Apps	(Gls)
2012	Jersey Express	13	(0)
2013	MYPA	12	(0)

International career
2007	Jamaica U17		
2008	Jamaica U20		
- * Club domestic league appearances and goals as of October 13, 2013

Yannick Salmon (born April 7, 1990) is an American-born Jamaican footballer who plays as a defender.

== Career ==
=== College and amateur ===
Salmon played one year of college soccer at the University of Maryland in 2007 before transferring to Rutgers University where he played from 2008 to 2010.

=== Professional career ===
Salmon was drafted 27th overall by Chicago Fire in the 2011 MLS Supplemental Draft. However, he wasn't signed by the team.

Salmon signed his first professional contract in February 2013, when he joined Finnish club MYPA.

=== International career ===
Salmon featured for the Jamaican U17 national team in 2007. He also featured for the Jamaica U20 in 2008.
