= Marcos Paullo =

Brazilian footballer

Personal information
- Full name: Marcos Paullo Barcelos Peixoto
- Date of birth: March 28, 1990 (age 36)
- Place of birth: Trindade, Goiás, Brazil
- Height: 1.74 m (5 ft 9 in)
- Positions: Attacking midfielder; left winger

Youth career
- 2007–2009: Goiás Esporte Clube
- 2010–2011: Atletico Paranaense

Senior career*
Years	Team	Apps	(Gls)
2011	New York Red Bulls	0	(0)
2012–2013	Trindade		
2013	Interporto		
2013	Vila Nova		
2013–2014	São Carlos	1	(0)
2014–2015	Interporto	22	(7)
2015	Aimoré	11	(3)
2015	Londrina	2	(0)
2016–2017	Moto Club	7	(2)
2016	→ Bragantino (loan)	5	(0)
2017	→ Campinense (loan)	5	(0)
2018	Itumbiara	0	(0)
2018	Formosa		
2018	Interporto	4	(1)
2019	Imperatriz	1	(0)
- * Club domestic league appearances and goals

Marcos Paullo Barcelos Peixoto (born March 28, 1990), known as just Marcos Paullo, is a Brazilian footballer.

== Club career ==
=== Brazil ===
Marcos Paullo began his career in the youth ranks of Goiás EC. He started his career as a left back but his attacking skills led to him being converted to an attacking midfielder, playing primarily as a left winger. He began to impress with the Goiás Under-17 side. In 2008, he moved up to the Under-18 side and helped Goiás capture the Campeonato Goiano Sub-18, scoring his club's second goal in a 3–1 victory over local rival Vila Nova. In 2009, he moved up the Under-20 side and played in the Campeonato Brasileiro Sub-20 and the Copa São Paulo de Juniores. In 2010, he joined Curitiba side Atletico Paranaense and played for their Under-20 side.

=== United States ===
During July 2010 he went on trial with New York Red Bulls in hopes of joining the club. He made an appearance in a friendly for New York on July 25, 2010, as a second-half substitute in a 2–1 victory over Manchester City. On February 2, 2011, it was announced that he had signed with New York Red Bulls. On June 28, 2011, Paullo made his first team debut for New York playing the full 90 in a 2–1 victory over FC New York in the US Open Cup.

Paullo was waived by New York on November 23, 2011.
