= Lenin Rodríguez =

Mexican footballer (born 2004)

Personal information
- Full name: Sergio Lenin Rodríguez Rodelas
- Date of birth: 31 January 2004 (age 22)
- Place of birth: Cuauhtémoc, Chihuahua, Mexico
- Height: 1.75 m (5 ft 9 in)
- Position: Midfielder

Team information
- Current team: Pachuca
- Number: 30

Youth career
- 2021–: Pachuca
- 2023: → Atlético Hidalgo (loan)
- 2024: → Jaiba Brava (loan)

Senior career*
Years	Team	Apps	(Gls)
2026–	Pachuca	21	(0)
- * Club domestic league appearances and goals as of 11 October 2026

Sergio Lenin Rodríguez Rodelas (born 31 January 2004) is a Mexican professional footballer who plays as a midfielder for Liga MX club Pachuca.

== Club career ==
Rodríguez began his career at the academy of Pachuca, which included loan spells to the Atlético Hidalgo and Jaiba Brava's academies before making his professional debut on 4 February 2026 in a 0–0 draw with Querétaro where he was subbed in at the 62nd minute and got a yellow card. Throughout his rookie season, he earned the trust of the coaching staff and on 17 March, he got a contract extension.

== Career statistics ==
=== Club ===
As of match played on 11 October 2026

Appearances and goals by club, season and competition
Club	Season	League			Cup		Continental		Other		Total	
Club	Season	Division	Apps	Goals	Apps	Goals	Apps	Goals	Apps	Goals	Apps	Goals
Pachuca	2025–26	Liga MX	14	0	—		—		—		14	0
Pachuca	2026–27	Liga MX	7	0	—		—		1 (Note: Appearances in Leagues Cup)	0	8	0
Career total			21	0	0	0	0	0	1	0	22	0
