= Morrison Agyemang =

Ghanaian footballer (born 2004)

Personal information
- Date of birth: 21 December 2004 (age 21)
- Place of birth: Accra, Ghana
- Height: 1.92 m (6 ft 4 in)
- Position: Centre-back

Team information
- Current team: Charlotte FC
- Number: 44

Youth career
- FDC Vista Gelendzhik
- Cheetah FC

Senior career*
Years	Team	Apps	(Gls)
2024–2025	Šibenik	33	(2)
2025–2026	Crown Legacy	6	(0)
2026–	Charlotte FC	27	(2)
- * Club domestic league appearances and goals as of 8 November 2026

Morrison Agyemang (born 21 December 2004) is a Ghanaian professional footballer player who plays as a centre-back for Major League Soccer club Charlotte FC.

== Club career ==
Agyemang made his first overseas transfer on 24 February 2024, moving to the Croatian club Šibenik.

Agyemang joined Crown Legacy on 30 July 2025.

On 20 February 2026, Agyemang signed a contract valid until 2029 with the Major League Soccer club Charlotte FC. He made his Major League Soccer debut on 1 March 2026, against LA Galaxy.
