= Teddy Schneider =

American soccer player

Personal information
- Full name: Theodore David Schneider
- Date of birth: November 23, 1988 (age 37)
- Place of birth: Califon, New Jersey, United States
- Height: 5 ft 6 in (1.68 m)
- Positions: Left back; left midfielder

College career
Years	Team	Apps	(Gls)
2007–2010	Princeton Tigers	35	(3)

Senior career*
Years	Team	Apps	(Gls)
2010	Central Jersey Spartans	14	(0)
2011	New York Red Bulls	0	(0)
- * Club domestic league appearances and goals as of January 14, 2011

Teddy David Schneider (born November 23, 1988, in Califon, New Jersey) is an American soccer player.

== Career ==
=== College and amateur ===
Schneider attended Delbarton School, and played four years of college soccer at Princeton. He initially began his career as a midfielder but was converted to left/right back during his third year at Princeton. In his four years at Princeton Schneider appeared in 69 matches and scored 7 goals and provided 8 assists.

Schneider played with Central Jersey Spartans in the USL Premier Development League during their 2010 inaugural season.

=== Professional ===
Schneider was selected 31st overall in the 2011 MLS Supplemental Draft by the New York Red Bulls. He spent pre-season with the club and eventually signed a contract on April 12, 2011. On June 28, 2011, Schneider made his first team debut for Red Bulls in a 2–1 victory over FC New York in the US Open Cup.

Schneider was waived by New York on November 23, 2011.
