= 2011 MLS supplemental draft =

College draft for soccer teams

The 2011 MLS supplemental draft is a secondary draft that was held by Major League Soccer on January 18, 2011. The draft consisted of three rounds with each of the 18 MLS clubs participating. The return of the Supplemental Draft after a two-year hiatus coincided with the return of the MLS Reserve Division in 2011.

== Player selection ==
Fifty-four players were selected during the three rounds. Vancouver Whitecaps FC had the first overall selection in the draft, followed by the Portland Timbers. The following eight selections were from teams that failed to qualify for the 2010 MLS Cup Playoffs, starting with the team holding the fewest 2010 regular-season points (three points per win, one point per draw). The subsequent eight selection positions of clubs were sorted by fewest regular-season points, from among teams that went out in the same round of the MLS Cup Playoffs. As similar in other drafts, teams were permitted to trade these rights away to other teams in exchange for other rights such as players, special roster spots, or other rights of interest.

The fourth round of the 2011 MLS SuperDraft was eliminated when the Supplemental Draft was re-instated. Traded fourth-round selections in the 2011 SuperDraft were converted into traded first-round selections in the 2011 Supplemental Draft.

=== Round one ===
Pick no.	MLS team	Player	Position	Affiliation
1	Vancouver Whitecaps FC	(New Zealand) Michael Boxall	Defender	UC Santa Barbara
2	Portland Timbers	(United States) Spencer Thompson	Forward	UC Irvine
3	Los Angeles Galaxy (Note: #3: D.C. United → Los Angeles Galaxy. 2011-01-13: Los Angeles acquired this selection and the #16 selection from D.C. United in exchange for a third-round selection (#50) in the 2011 MLS SuperDraft.)	(New Zealand) Dan Keat	Midfielder	Dartmouth College
4	New York Red Bulls (Note: #4: Chivas USA → New York Red Bulls. 2009-09-11: New York acquired this selection from Chivas USA in exchange for goalkeeper Jon Conway.)	(United States) James Kirkpatrick	Goalkeeper	University of South Carolina; Atlanta Blackhawks
5	Philadelphia Union	(United States) Ryan Richter	Midfielder	La Salle University; Ocean City Nor'easters
6	New England Revolution	(United States) Hunter Christensen	Midfielder	University of Tulsa
7	Houston Dynamo	(United States) Evan Newton	Goalkeeper	Old Dominion University
8	Toronto FC	(United States) J. C. Banks	Midfielder	University of Wisconsin–Green Bay; Chicago Fire Premier
9	Chicago Fire	(Jamaica) Amani Walker	Forward	UC Irvine; Orange County Blue Star
10	Sporting Kansas City	(United States) Sam Scales	Midfielder	Ohio State University
11	Seattle Sounders FC	(United States) Josh Ford	Goalkeeper	University of Connecticut
12	Portland Timbers (Note: #12: Columbus → D.C. United → Portland. 2010-11-24: Portland acquired this selection and defender Rodney Wallace from D.C. United in exchange for midfielder Dax McCarty and allocation money. D.C. United had acquired this pick and defender Jed Zayner from Columbus in exchange for D.C. United's second-round 2012 MLS SuperDraft selection on 2010-08-06.)	(United States) Robby Lynch	Midfielder	University of Evansville; Kalamazoo Outrage
13	Toronto FC (Note: #13: New York Red Bulls → Toronto FC. 2010-03-11: Toronto FC acquired this selection from New York in exchange for midfielder Carl Robinson.)	(Republic of Ireland) Steven Beattie	Forward	Northern Kentucky University; Cincinnati Kings
14	Real Salt Lake	(United States) Jeff Attinella	Goalkeeper	University of South Florida; Bradenton Academics
15	FC Dallas (Note: #15: San Jose → FC Dallas. 2009-04-28: FC Dallas acquired a conditional draft pick in 2011, which became this selection, from San Jose in exchange for defender Aaron Pitchkolan. (Note: Goff, Steven (April 28, 2009). "Dallas Roster Move(s)". The Washington Post.))	(France) Alexis Pradié	Defender	Embry–Riddle Aeronautical University; Ottawa Fury
16	Los Angeles Galaxy (Note: #16: Los Angeles → D.C. United → Los Angeles. 2011-01-13: Los Angeles re-acquired this selection and acquired the #3 selection from D.C. United in exchange for a third-round selection (#50) in the 2011 MLS SuperDraft. D.C. United had acquired this selection from Los Angeles in exchange for forward Adam Cristman on 2011-01-11.)	(United States) Ryan Thomas	Defender	Stanford University
17	FC Dallas	(Nigeria) Paul Ogunyemi	Midfielder	Schoolcraft College; Portland Timbers U23's
18	FC Dallas (Note: #18: Colorado → FC Dallas. 2010-07-30: FC Dallas acquired this selection and a conditional 2012 MLS SuperDraft selection from Colorado in exchange for defender Anthony Wallace.)	(Uruguay) Brayan Martinez	Midfielder	Seton Hall; Central Jersey Spartans

=== Round two ===
Pick no.	MLS team	Player	Position	Affiliation
19	Vancouver Whitecaps FC	(United States) Joe Anderson	Midfielder	Coastal Carolina University
20	Portland Timbers	(United States) Raymundo Reza	Forward	San Diego State
21	D.C. United	(United States) Blake Brettschneider	Forward	University of South Carolina; Atlanta Blackhawks
22	Chivas USA	(United States) Ernesto Carranza	Midfielder	Sacramento State; Sacramento Gold
23	Philadelphia Union	(United States) Josh Walburn	Defender	Princeton University; Central Jersey Spartans
24	New England Revolution	(United States) Fernando Cabadas	Midfielder	Sacramento State
25	Houston Dynamo	(Mexico) Sergio Castillo	Midfielder	Creighton University
26	Toronto FC	(United States) Spencer Thompson	Forward	Michigan State University; Michigan Bucks
27	Chicago Fire	(Jamaica) Yannick Salmon	Midfielder	Rutgers University
28	Sporting Kansas City	(United States) Mike Jones	Defender	SIUE
29	Seattle Sounders FC	(United States) Corey Attaway	Midfielder	UC Irvine; Orange County Blue Star
30	Columbus Crew	(United States) Ben Sippola	Defender	Butler University; Rochester Thunder
31	New York Red Bulls	(United States) Teddy Schneider	Defender	Princeton University; Central Jersey Spartans
32	Real Salt Lake	(United States) Drew Cost	Midfielder	Penn State
33	San Jose Earthquakes	(United States) Phil Tuttle	Goalkeeper	University of Notre Dame
34	Los Angeles Galaxy	(United States) Dustin McCarty	Midfielder	University of North Carolina; Carolina Dynamo
35	FC Dallas	(United States) Kekoa Osorio	Midfielder	Southern Methodist
36	Colorado Rapids	(England) Phil Bannister	Forward	Loyola University

=== Round three ===
Pick no.	MLS team	Player	Position	Affiliation
37	Vancouver Whitecaps FC	(United States) Santiago Bedoya	Defender	Northeastern University
38	Portland Timbers	(United States) Taylor Mueller	Defender	University of Washington; Tacoma Tide
39	D.C. United	PASS	-	-
40	Chivas USA	(Canada) Curtis Ushedo	Defender	University of Alabama at Birmingham
41	Philadelphia Union	(United States) Matthew Marcin	Midfielder	Providence College; Forest City London
42	New England Revolution	(United States) Andrew Sousa	Midfielder	Providence College; Forest City London
43	Houston Dynamo	PASS	-	-
44	Toronto FC	(United States) Scott Rojo	Midfielder	High Point University; Carolina Dynamo
45	Chicago Fire	(United States) Sam Arthur	Forward	University of South Carolina; Atlanta Blackhawks
46	Sporting Kansas City	(Slovakia) Michal Mravec	Midfielder	University of Alabama at Birmingham
47	Seattle Sounders FC	(United States) Sean Morris	Midfielder	Seattle University; Washington Crossfire
48	Columbus Crew	(United States) Andy Adlard	Midfielder	Indiana University; Chicago Fire Premier
49	New York Red Bulls	PASS	-	-
50	Real Salt Lake	(United States) Nick Love	Forward	Gonzaga University; Spokane Spiders
51	San Jose Earthquakes	(United States) Victor Cortez	Defender	University of San Francisco; Bay Area Ambassadors
52	Los Angeles Galaxy	(United States) Zach Johnson	Goalkeeper	West Virginia University
53	FC Dallas	(United States) Craig Hill	Goalkeeper	Southern Methodist University
54	Colorado Rapids	(Trinidad and Tobago) Javed Mohammed	Defender	University of South Florida

== Selections by position ==
Round	Forwards	Midfielders	Defenders	Goalkeepers
1st	3	8	3	4
2nd	5	8	4	1
3rd	2	6	5	2
Totals	10	22	12	7
