= 2025 Charlotte FC season =

Season of an American soccer team

Charlotte FC
2025 season
- Sporting director: Zoran Krneta
- Head coach: Dean Smith
- Stadium: Bank of America Stadium
- Major League Soccer: Conference: 4th Overall: 7th
- MLS Cup Playoffs: Round one
- Leagues Cup: League stage
- U.S. Open Cup: Round of 16
- Top goalscorer: League: Idan Toklomati (11); All: Idan Toklomati (12)
- Average home league attendance: 28,975
Home colors	Away colors	Third colors

The 2025 season was the fourth season for Charlotte FC in Major League Soccer (MLS), the top flight of professional club soccer in the United States. The team, based in Charlotte, North Carolina, was established in 2019 and made their debut in the 2022 season. The 2025 season was the second for Charlotte FC under English head coach Dean Smith, who was hired in December 2023 as the team's third manager.

The team began their preseason on January 13 and trained later that month in Miami, Florida, where they played several friendlies. They returned to their home state for a friendly against North Carolina FC and also played in the Coachella Valley Invitational in Indio, California. Charlotte FC had a run of several losses in May and June, but entered a nine-match regular season winning streak in early July that is tied with Seattle Sounders FC for the longest in the league's post-shootout era. The streak ended with a loss to New York City FC on September 20.

In addition to league play, Charlotte FC participated in the 2025 Leagues Cup and 2025 U.S. Open Cup. The team were eliminated in the U.S. Open Cup's round of 16 by D.C. United after a 3–3 draw and penalty shootout. In the Leagues Cup, Charlotte FC finished the group stage with one win against C.F. Monterrey, one shootout loss to C.D. Guadalajara, and one loss in regulation time to FC Juárez.

== Squad information ==
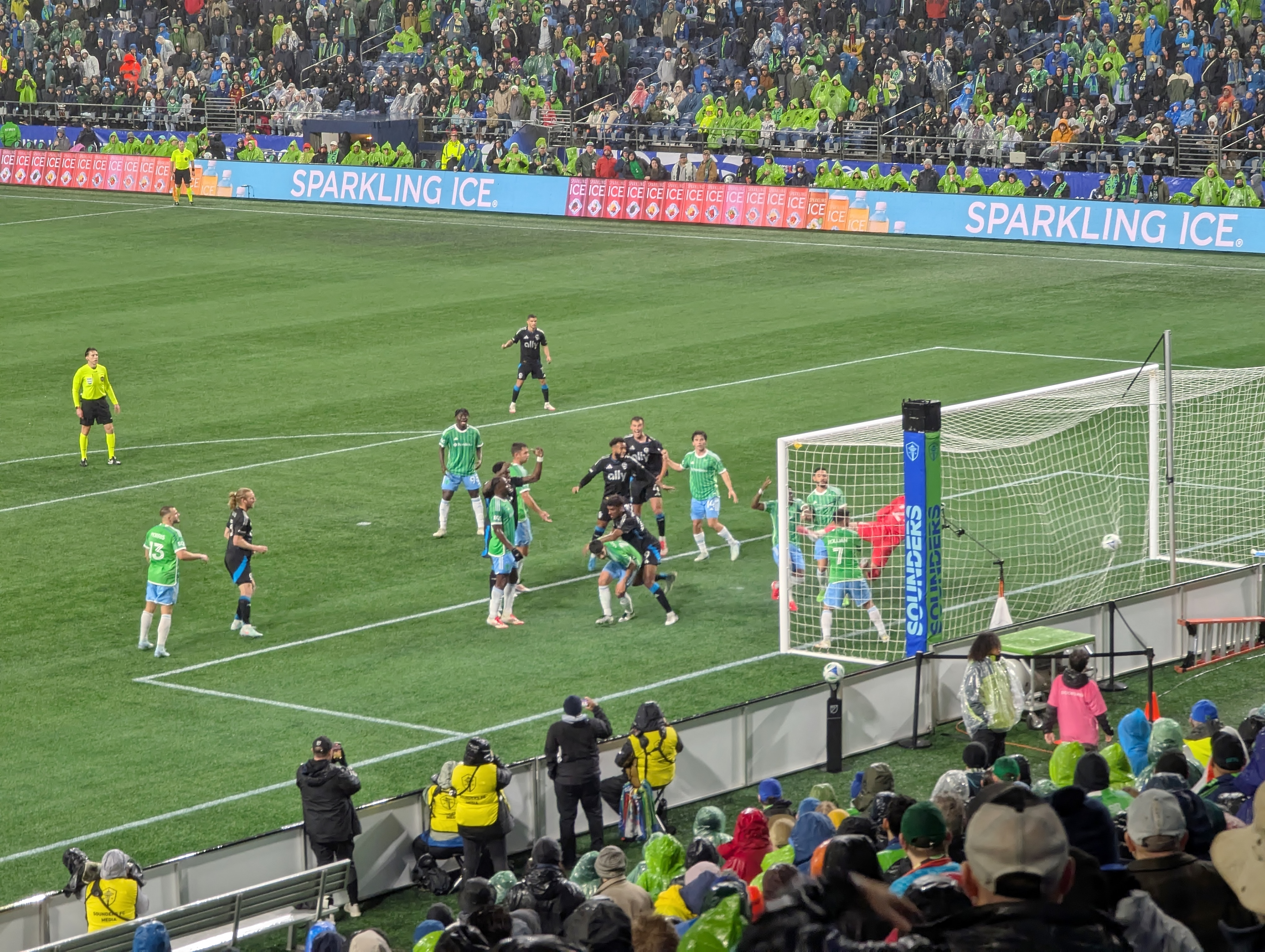
Adilson Malanda scores the opening goal in a draw with Seattle Sounders FC

As of August 19, 2025

Note: Flags indicate national team as defined under FIFA eligibility rules; some limited exceptions apply. Players may hold more than one non-FIFA nationality.

No.	Pos.	Nation	Player
1	GK	CRO	Kristijan Kahlina
2	DF	CAN	Jahkeele Marshall-Rutty (on loan from CF Montréal)
3	DF	USA	Tim Ream
4	MF	USA	Andrew Privett
6	DF	NZL	Bill Tuiloma
8	MF	ENG	Ashley Westwood (captain)
10	FW	CIV	Wilfried Zaha (on loan from Galatasaray; DP)
11	FW	ISR	Liel Abada (DP)
13	MF	USA	Brandt Bronico
14	DF	ENG	Nathan Byrne
16	MF	ESP	Pep Biel (on loan from Olympiacos)
17	FW	ISR	Idan Toklomati
18	FW	COL	Kerwin Vargas
19	DF	USA	Eryk Williamson
21	MF	FRA	Souleyman Doumbia (on loan from Standard Liège)
22	GK	USA	David Bingham

No.	Pos.	Nation	Player
23	MF	SRB	Nikola Petković
24	DF	USA	Mikah Thomas
25	FW	ENG	Tyger Smalls
26	GK	USA	Chituru Odunze
27	FW	USA	Nimfasha Berchimas (HG)
28	MF	FRA	Djibril Diani
29	DF	FRA	Adilson Malanda
31	GK	USA	George Marks
35	MF	USA	Nick Scardina
36	MF	CAN	Brandon Cambridge (HG)
39	DF	USA	Jack Neeley (HG)
40	DF	USA	Jahlane Forbes
41	FW	USA	Brian Romero (HG)

=== Out on loan ===
Note: Flags indicate national team as defined under FIFA eligibility rules; some limited exceptions apply. Players may hold more than one non-FIFA nationality.

No.	Pos.	Nation	Player

== Coaching staff ==
As of August 2025

Technical staff
Head coach	Dean Smith
Associate head coach	Miles Joseph
Assistant coach	Christian Fuchs
Sporting director	Zoran Krnet
Head of goalkeeping	Aron Hyde
Head video coach	Rohan Sachdev

=== Player movement ===
==== Transfers In ====
Pos.	Player	Transferred from	Fee/notes	Date
MF	(United States) Eryk Williamson	(United States) Portland Timbers	Trade	January 15, 2025
DF	(England) Harry Toffolo	(England) Nottingham Forest	Free agent	August 5, 2025
FW	(Australia) Archie Goodwin	(Australia) Adelaide United	Transfer	August 13, 2025
GK	(United States) Drake Callender	(United States) Inter Miami CF	Cash-for-player trade	August 19, 2025

==== Loans In ====
Pos.	Player	Loaned from	Date
MF	(Spain) Pep Biel	(Greece) Olympiacos	January 13, 2025
FW	(Ivory Coast) Wilfried Zaha	(Turkey) Galatasaray	January 22, 2025
DF	(Ivory Coast) Souleyman Doumbia	(Belgium) Standard Liège	March 12, 2025
DF	(Canada) Jahkeele Marshall-Rutty	(Canada) CF Montréal	April 23, 2025

==== Transfers Out ====
Pos.	Player	Transferred to	Fee/notes	Date
DF	(Senegal) Hamady Diop	(United States) San Diego FC	Expansion draft	December 11, 2024
DF	(Finland) Jere Uronen	(Sweden) AIK Fotboll	Transfer	January 8, 2025
FW	(Poland) Karol Świderski	(Greece) Panathinaikos	Transfer	January 23, 2025
MF	(United States) Ben Bender	(United States) Philadelphia Union	Waived	April 25, 2025
DF	(Brazil) João Pedro Reginaldo	(Poland) Radomiak Radom	Transfer	July 9, 2025
FW	(Portugal) Iuri Tavares	(Croatia) NK Varaždin	Transfer	July 9, 2025
FW	(United States) Patrick Agyemang	(England) Derby County	Transfer	July 15, 2025

==== Loans Out ====
Pos.	Player	Loaned from	Date
DF	(Brazil) João Pedro Reginaldo	(Portugal) Rio Ave FC	February 1, 2025

== Draft picks ==
=== MLS Re-Entry Draft picks ===
2024 Charlotte FC Re-Entry Picks
Round	Selection	Player	Position	Team	Notes
1 (Stage 1)	16	PASS			
2 (Stage 2)	29				

=== MLS SuperDraft picks ===
2024 Charlotte FC Re-Entry Picks
Round	Pick	Player	Position	College Conference
1	17			
2	47			
3	77			

== Competitions ==
Win Draw Loss

All matches are in Eastern Time

=== Preseason ===
January 29	Sporting Kansas City	2–3	Charlotte FC	Miami, Florida
11:00 a.m. EST	Toye 33'; Barlett 59' (pen.)	Report	Agyemang 52', 56'; Cambridge 86' (pen.)	Stadium: FIU Soccer Stadium

February 5	North Carolina FC	1–0	Charlotte FC	Cary, North Carolina
6:00 p.m. EST	Dolabella (2nd half)	Report		Stadium: WakeMed Soccer Park

February 9 Coachella Valley Invitational	LA Galaxy	2–2	Charlotte FC	Indio, California
1:00 p.m. EST	Yoshida 24'; Berry 69'	Report	Bronico 15'; Abada 68' (pen.)	Stadium: Empire Polo Club

February 15 Coachella Valley Invitational	Charlotte FC	2–0	Portland Timbers	Indio, California
1:00 p.m. EST	Vargas 65'; Smalls 89'	Report		Stadium: Empire Polo Club

=== Overview ===
Competition	First match	Last match	Starting round	Final position	Record							
Competition	First match	Last match	Starting round	Final position	Pld	W	D	L	GF	GA	GD	Win %
Major League Soccer	February 22, 2025	October 18, 2025	Matchday 1	TBD	27	14	2	11	45	39	+6	51.85
MLS Cup Playoffs	TBD	TBD	TBD	TBD	0	0	0	0	0	0	+0	—
Leagues Cup	July 31, 2025	August 7, 2025	League Phase	TBD	3	1	1	1	5	6	−1	33.33
U.S. Open Cup	May 6, 2025	TBD	Round of 32	Round of 16	2	1	1	0	7	4	+3	50.00
Total					32	16	4	12	57	49	+8	50.00

Last updated: August 19, 2025
Source: Competitions

=== Major League Soccer (MLS) ===
==== Standings ====
MLS Eastern Conference table (2025)
Pos	Team	Pld	W	L	T	GF	GA	GD	Pts	Qualification
2	FC Cincinnati	34	20	9	5	52	40	+12	65	Qualification for round one
3	Inter Miami CF (C)	34	19	7	8	81	55	+26	65	Qualification for round one
4	Charlotte FC	34	19	13	2	55	46	+9	59	Qualification for round one
5	New York City FC	34	17	12	5	50	44	+6	56	Qualification for round one
6	Nashville SC	34	16	12	6	58	45	+13	54	Qualification for round one

Source: MLS
Rules for classification: 1) points; 2) total wins; 3) total goal differential; 4) total goals scored; 5) fewer disciplinary points; 6) away goal differential; 7) away goals scored; 8) home goals differential; 9) home goals scored; 10) coin toss (2 clubs tied) or drawing of lots (≥3 clubs tied)
(C) Conference champion

Overall MLS standings table (2025)
Pos	Team	Pld	W	L	T	GF	GA	GD	Pts	Qualification
5	Vancouver Whitecaps FC (V)	34	18	7	9	66	38	+28	63	Qualification for the CONCACAF Champions Cup Round one (Note: As second highest-ranked club in 2025 MLS Supporters' Shield not already qualified)
6	Los Angeles FC	34	17	8	9	65	40	+25	60	Qualification for the CONCACAF Champions Cup Round one (Note: As third highest-ranked club in 2025 MLS Supporters' Shield not already qualified)
7	Charlotte FC	34	19	13	2	55	46	+9	59	
8	Minnesota United FC	34	16	8	10	56	39	+17	58	
9	New York City FC	34	17	12	5	50	44	+6	56	

Source: MLS
Rules for classification: 1) points; 2) total wins; 3) total goal differential; 4) total goals scored; 5) fewer disciplinary points; 6) away goal differential; 7) away goals scored; 8) home goals differential; 9) home goals scored; 10) coin toss (2 clubs tied) or drawing of lots (≥3 clubs tied)
(V) Canadian Championship winners

==== Results summary ====
Overall								Home						Away					
Pld	Pts	W	L	T	GF	GA	GD	W	L	T	GF	GA	GD	W	L	T	GF	GA	GD
34	59	19	13	2	55	46	+9	13	3	1	33	16	+17	6	10	1	22	30	−8

Last updated: October 18, 2025
Source: MLS Results
Pld = Matches played; Pts = Points; W = Matches won; T = Matches tied; L = Matches lost; GF = Goals for; GA = Goals against; GD = Goal difference

==== Results by round ====
Round	1	2	3	4	5	6	7	8	9	10	11	12	13	14	15	16	17	18	19	20	21	22	23	24	25	26	27	28	29	30	31	32	33	34
Stadium	A	H	A	H	H	A	H	A	H	H	A	A	A	H	H	A	A	A	A	A	H	H	H	A	H	A	H	H	A	H	A	H	A	H
Result	D	W	L	W	W	L	W	W	W	L	L	L	L	L	W	L	W	L	L	L	D	W	W	W	W	W	W	W	W	W	L	L	W	W
Points	1	4	4	7	10	10	13	16	19	19	19	19	19	19	22	22	25	25	25	25	26	29	32	35	38	41	44	47	50	53	53	53	56	59
Position (East)	9	4	6	4	2	6	4	2	1	4	5	6	7	8	8	9	8	10	9	10	10	9	9	7	7	7	7	4	3	3	4	5	4	4

Updated to match(es) played on October 4, 2025. Source: Match reports
A = Away; H = Home; N = Neutral; W = Win; D = Draw; L = Loss; = Conference leader; = Playoffs berth; = Wild card berth

=== Match results ===
Win Draw Loss Void Postponed

February 22 1	Seattle Sounders FC	2–2	Charlotte FC	Seattle, Washington
10:30 pm EST	Nouhou (yellow card) 1'; Morris 19', 49'	Report	Malanda 35'; Abada (yellow card) 59'; Yeimar 90+3' (o.g.)	Stadium: Lumen Field; Attendance: 30,055; Referee: Filip Dujic

March 1 2	Charlotte FC	2–0	Atlanta United FC	Charlotte, North Carolina
2:15 pm EST	Biel 50'; Zaha 54'; Bronico (yellow card) 61'; Agyemang (yellow card) 76'	Report	Muyumba (yellow card) 77'; Slisz (yellow card) 90+8'	Stadium: Bank of America Stadium; Attendance: 51,002; Referee: Rubiel Vaquez

March 9 3	Inter Miami CF	1–0	Charlotte FC	Fort Lauderdale, Florida
4:00 pm EDT	Avilés (yellow card) 30'; Ustari (red card) 38'; Suárez (yellow card) 45'; Allende 46'; Bright (yellow card) 90+3'	Report	Malanda (yellow card) 82'	Stadium: Chase Stadium; Attendance: 20,436; Referee: Guido Gonzales Jr.
Note: The match was originally scheduled for a 5:00 pm kickoff but was moved an hour later per a prior announcement.

March 15 4	Charlotte FC	2–0	FC Cincinnati	Charlotte, North Carolina
7:30 pm EDT	Abada 48'; Agyemang 51'	Report	Flores (yellow card) 45' (yellow-red card) 83'; Nwobodo (yellow card) 76'	Stadium: Bank of America Stadium; Attendance: 27,807; Referee: Sergii Boiko

March 22 5	Charlotte FC	4–1	San Jose Earthquakes	Charlotte, North Carolina
7:30 pm EDT	Biel 11'; Westwood 36'; Bronico 40', (yellow card) 40'; Vargas 52'; Diani (yellow card) 73'; Privett (red card) 74'	Report	Arango 77' (pen.); Rodrigues (yellow card) 80'	Stadium: Bank of America Stadium; Attendance: 27,463; Referee: Armando Villarreal

March 29 6	Colorado Rapids	2–0	Charlotte FC	Commerce City, Colorado
4:30 pm EDT	Awaziem (yellow card) 10'; Mihailovic 78', 81' (pen.)	Report	Zaha (yellow card) 54'; Malanda (yellow card) 80'	Stadium: Dick's Sporting Goods Park; Attendance: 15,211; Referee: Allen Chapman

April 5 7	Charlotte FC	2–1	Nashville SC	Charlotte, North Carolina
2:30 pm EDT	Westwood (yellow card) 52'; Vargas (yellow card) 72'; Zaha 85' (pen.); Toklomati 90'; Byrne (yellow card) 90+11'	Report	Najar (yellow card) 13'; Mukhtar 32'; Tagseth (yellow card) 68'	Stadium: Bank of America Stadium; Attendance: 29,591; Referee: Lukasz Szpala

April 12 8	CF Montréal	0–1	Charlotte FC	Montreal, Quebec
7:30 pm EDT	Loturi (yellow card) 35'; Clark (yellow card) 39'; Owusu (yellow card) 60'; Álvarez (yellow card) 89'	Report	Biel 16'; Agyemang (yellow card) 63'	Stadium: Saputo Stadium; Attendance: 19,619; Referee: Rubiel Vazquez

April 19 9	Charlotte FC	3–0	San Diego FC	Charlotte, North Carolina
7:30 pm EDT	Abada 11'; Agyemang 45' (pen.); Privett 57'; Bronico (yellow card) 59'; Williamson (yellow card) 77'	Report	Reyes (yellow card) 32' (yellow-red card) 39'; Diop (yellow card) 67'; Lozano (yellow card) 90+2'	Stadium: Bank of America Stadium; Attendance: 29,653; Referee: Filip Dujic

April 26 10	Charlotte FC	0–1	New England Revolution	Charlotte, North Carolina
7:30 pm EDT	Malanda (yellow card) 8'; Bronico (yellow card) 70'; Vargas (yellow card) 89'	Report	Ceballos (yellow card) 34'; Fofana (yellow card) 61'; Sands (yellow card) 76'; Gil 77'	Stadium: Bank of America Stadium; Attendance: 29,233; Referee: Victor Rivas

May 3 11	Columbus Crew	4–2	Charlotte FC	Columbus, Ohio
7:30 pm EDT	Zawadzki (yellow card) 14'; Chambost 25'; Rossi 39' (pen.); Russell-Rowe (yellow card) 45+8', (goal) 81'; Jackson 51'	Report	Zaha 45+2' (pen.); Abada 64'	Stadium: Lower.com Field; Attendance: 20,167; Referee: Allen Chapman

May 10 12	Nashville SC	2–1	Charlotte FC	Nashville, Tennessee
8:30 pm EDT	Palacios (yellow card) 23'; Lovitz (yellow card) 44'; Mukhtar 49'; Shaffelburg 54'; Yazbek (yellow card) 58'	Report	Abada 48'; Toklomati (yellow card) 72'; Westwood (yellow card) 79'	Stadium: Geodis Park; Attendance: 25,002; Referee: Alexis Da Silva

May 14 13	Orlando City SC	3–1	Charlotte FC	Orlando, Florida
7:30 pm EDT	Muriel 8'; Ojeda 24'; Araújo (yellow card) 58'; Gerbet (yellow card) 80'; Enrique 82'	Report	Zaha (yellow card) 27', (goal) 34'	Stadium: Inter&Co Stadium; Attendance: 17,007; Referee: Sergii Boiko

May 17 14	Charlotte FC	1–4	Chicago Fire FC	Charlotte, North Carolina
7:30 pm EDT	Agyemang 70'; Westwood (yellow card) 77'; Biel (yellow card) 90+7'	Report	Rogers (yellow card) 8'; Pineda (yellow card) 24'; Bamba 42'; Gutiérrez 60', 79' (pen.); Zinckernagel 64'	Stadium: Bank of America Stadium; Attendance: 29,755; Referee: Ismir Pekmic

May 24 15	Charlotte FC	3–2	Columbus Crew	Charlotte, North Carolina
7:30 pm EDT	Agyemang 19', 24'; Westwood (yellow card) 26'; Biel 75'; Bronico (yellow card) 90+2'	Report	Aliyu 15'; Amundsen 65'	Stadium: Bank of America Stadium; Attendance: 29,755; Referee: Lukasz Szpala

May 28 16	New York Red Bulls	4–2	Charlotte FC	Harrison, New Jersey
7:30 pm EDT	Bogacz 14'; Sofo 29'; Choupo-Moting 70' (pen.), 90+7' (pen.); Edelman (yellow card) 81'; Donkor (yellow card) 90+2'	Report	Vargas 26'; Biel (yellow card) 40'; Zaha (yellow card) 64'; Privett (yellow card) 68'; Abada 76'; Malanda (yellow card) 90+5'	Stadium: Sports Illustrated Stadium; Attendance: 11,135; Referee: Drew Fischer

May 31 17	Toronto FC	0–2	Charlotte FC	Toronto, Ontario
7:30 pm EDT	Flores (yellow card) 37'; Osorio (yellow card) 80'; Laryea (yellow card) 86'; Petretta (yellow card) 90+2'	Report	Biel 56'; Agyemang 90', (yellow card) 90+1'	Stadium: BMO Field; Attendance: 19,406; Referee: Joe Dickerson

June 14 18	Philadelphia Union	2–1	Charlotte FC	Chester, Pennsylvania
7:30 pm EDT	Makhanya (yellow card) 33'; Bender (yellow card) 45'; Bueno 45+2'; Westfield (yellow card) 74'; Damiani (yellow card) 81'; Anderson 90+8'	Report	Vargas (yellow card) 29'; Zaha (yellow card) 33', (goal) 78'	Stadium: Subaru Park; Attendance: 18,839; Referee: Ricardo Montero

June 25 19	Sporting Kansas City	2–1	Charlotte FC	Kansas City, Kansas
8:30 pm EDT	Fernández (yellow card) 66'; Toye 90+3'; Joveljić 90+6'	Report	Toklomati 34'; Williamson (yellow card) 55'; Zaha (yellow card) 63'	Stadium: Children's Mercy Park; Attendance: 16,223; Referee: Rubiel Vazquez

June 28 20	Chicago Fire FC	3–2	Charlotte FC	Chicago, Illinois
8:30 pm EDT	Zinckernagel 23'; Gutiérrez 25'; Cuypers 33'; Haile-Selassie (yellow card) 50'; Dean (yellow card) 77'; Gutman (yellow card) 80'; Rogers (yellow card) 82'; Oregel (yellow card) 88'	Report	Biel 56', (yellow card) 79'; Toklomati 59'; Zaha (yellow card) 60'	Stadium: Soldier Field; Attendance: 17,837; Referee: Sergii Boiko

July 5 21	Charlotte FC	2–2	Orlando City SC	Charlotte, North Carolina
7:00 pm EDT	Biel 40'; Toklomati (yellow card) 49'; Tuiloma 65'; Westwood (yellow card) 68'	Report	Brekalo (yellow card) 17'; Gallese (yellow card) 64'; Enrique 69'; Jansson (yellow card) 75'; Pašalić 80'; Araújo (yellow card) 90+6'	Stadium: Bank of America Stadium; Attendance: 28,734; Referee: Rosendo Mendoza

July 12 22	Charlotte FC	2–0	New York City FC	Charlotte, North Carolina
7:30 pm EDT	Toklomati 14'; Marshall-Rutty (yellow card) 17'; Scardina (yellow card) 61'; Vargas 81'; Bronico (yellow card) 84'	Report	Wolf (yellow card) 43'; Fernández (yellow card) 67'; Moralez (yellow card) 90+4'	Stadium: Bank of America Stadium; Attendance: 28,164; Referee: Guido Gonzales Jr.

July 16 23	Charlotte FC	2–1	D.C. United	Charlotte, North Carolina
7:30 pm EDT	Biel 44', 48'	Report	Hopkins (yellow card) 38'; Pirani 60'	Stadium: Bank of America Stadium; Attendance: 32,293; Referee: Chris Penso

July 19 24	Atlanta United FC	2–3	Charlotte FC	Atlanta, Georgia
7:30 pm EDT	Muyumba 19'; Hernández (yellow card) 41'; Latte Lath 86'	Report	Biel (yellow card) 36', (goal) 77'; Toklomati 46'; Zaha 59'	Stadium: Mercedes-Benz Stadium; Attendance: 60,005; Referee: Allen Chapman

July 26 25	Charlotte FC	2–0	Toronto FC	Charlotte, North Carolina
7:30 pm EDT	Toklomati 60'; Vargas 65'; Westwood (yellow card) 68'	Report	Dominguez (yellow card) 39'	Stadium: Bank of America Stadium; Attendance: 27,835; Referee: Jair Marrufo

August 10 26	FC Cincinnati	0−1	Charlotte FC	Cincinnati, Ohio
6:00 pm EDT	Engel (yellow card) 62'; Valenzuela (yellow card) 64'; Anunga (red card) 70'; Celentano (yellow card) 82'; Evander (yellow card) 90+8'	Report	Zaha 85'; Vargas (yellow card) 90+7'	Stadium: TQL Stadium; Attendance: 25,513; Referee: Filip Dujic

August 16 27	Charlotte FC	1–0	Real Salt Lake	Charlotte, North Carolina
7:30 pm EDT	Zaha (yellow card) 3'; Toklomati 35'	Report	Glad (yellow card) 33'; Gozo (yellow card) 38'; Vera (yellow card) 70'; Agada (yellow card) 87'	Stadium: Bank of America Stadium; Attendance: 28,201; Referee: Tori Penso

August 24 28	Charlotte FC	1–0	New York Red Bulls	Charlotte, North Carolina
7:00 pm EDT	Vargas 30'	Report	D. Nealis (yellow card) 22'; Edelman (yellow card) 37'; Duncan (yellow card) 52'; Forsberg (yellow card) 88'	Stadium: Bank of America Stadium; Attendance: 26,606; Referee: Armando Villarreal

August 30 29	New England Revolution	1–2	Charlotte FC	Foxborough, Massachusetts
7:30 pm EDT	Ganago 24'; Chancalay (yellow card) 90+3'	Report	Bronico 12', (yellow card) 48'; Westwood (yellow card) 30'; Williamson (yellow card) 44'; Zaha (yellow card) 45+5'; Toklomati (yellow card) 61', (goal) 87'	Stadium: Gillette Stadium; Attendance: 19,782; Referee: Rosendo Mendoza

September 13 30	Charlotte FC	3–0	Inter Miami CF	Charlotte, North Carolina
7:30 pm EDT	Toklomati 34', 47', 84' (pen.); Bronico (yellow card) 43'; Marshall-Rutty (yellow card) 55'	Report	Fray (yellow card) 22'; Segovia (yellow card) 56'; Avilés (yellow card) 67' (yellow-red card) 79'; Weigandt (yellow card) 78'	Stadium: Bank of America Stadium; Attendance: 35,607; Referee: Sergii Boiko

September 20 31	New York City FC	2–0	Charlotte FC	New York, New York
7:30 pm EDT	Martínez 11' (pen.), 58' (pen.); N. Fernández (yellow card) 45+3'; O'Toole (yellow card) 60'; Perea (yellow card) 64'; J. Fernández (yellow card) 90+3'	Report	Khalina (yellow card) 10'; Bronico (yellow card) 16'; Byrne (yellow card) 20'; Westwood (yellow card) 58'; Privett (yellow card) 90+6'	Stadium: Yankee Stadium; Referee: Timothy Ford
Note: Match originally scheduled for September 19.

September 27 32	Charlotte FC	1–4	CF Montréal	Charlotte, North Carolina
7:30 pm EDT	Zaha 10'; Malanda (red card) 20'; Westwood (yellow card) 70'; Toklomati (yellow card) 73'; Bronico (yellow card) 83'; Ream (yellow card) 90+7'	Report	Sealy 41', 86'; Herbers 53'; Hidalgo (yellow card) 80'; Owusu 90'	Stadium: Bank of America Stadium; Attendance: 28,841; Referee: Ricardo Montero

October 4 33	D.C. United	0–1	Charlotte FC	Washington, D.C.
2:30 pm EDT	Barraza (red card) 21'; Herrera (red card) 30'; Hopkins (yellow card) 42'; Stroud (yellow card) 61'	Report	Zaha 33', (yellow card) 75'; Byrne (yellow card) 37'; Williamson (yellow card) 82'	Stadium: Audi Field; Attendance: 17,003; Referee: Lorenzo Hernandez

October 18 34	Charlotte FC	2–0	Philadelphia Union	Charlotte, North Carolina
6:00 pm EDT	Zaha 24', (red card) 90'; Vargas 30'; Marshall-Rutty (yellow card) 89'		Jean Jacques (yellow card) 32'; Uhre (yellow card) 44'; Harriel (yellow card) 71'; Damiani (yellow card) 73'	Stadium: Bank of America Stadium; Referee: Tori Penso

=== MLS Cup Playoffs ===
==== Round One ====
October 28 Round One	Charlotte FC	0–1	New York City FC	Charlotte, North Carolina
6:45 pm EDT		Report	Martínez 34'; O'Neill (yellow card) 36'; Gray (yellow card) 56'; Gustavo (yellow card) 68'; Haak (yellow card) 71'; O'Toole (yellow card) 90'	Stadium: Bank of America Stadium; Attendance: 33,709; Referee: Jon Freemon

November 1 Round One	New York City FC	0–0 (6–7 p)	Charlotte FC	New York, New York
3:30 pm EDT	O'Neill (yellow card) 27'; Gray (yellow card) 84'	Report	Diani (yellow card) 61'; Byrne (yellow card) 72'; Zaha (yellow card) 81'	Stadium: Yankee Stadium; Attendance: 19,051; Referee: Rubiel Vazquez
	Penalties
	Martínez (penalty scored); O'Neill (penalty scored); Thiago Martins (penalty scored); J. Fernández (penalty missed); Haak (penalty scored); Wolf (penalty scored); Raul Gustavo (penalty scored); Ojeda (penalty missed)		(penalty scored) Goodwin; (penalty missed) Westwood; (penalty scored) Toklomati; (penalty scored) Toffolo; (penalty scored) Zaha; (penalty scored) Malanda; (penalty scored) Diani; (penalty scored) Byrne

November 7 Round One	Charlotte FC	1–3	New York City FC	Charlotte, North Carolina
7:00 pm EST	Toklomati 81'; Goodwin (yellow card) 87'; Ream (yellow card) 90+2'	Report	N. Fernández 45+2', 90+10', (yellow card) 90+2'; Martínez 50'; Perea (yellow card) 67'; O'Neill (yellow card) 67'	Stadium: Bank of America Stadium; Attendance: 34,473; Referee: Pierre-Luc Lauzière

=== U.S. Open Cup ===
May 6 Round of 32	North Carolina FC	1–4 (a.e.t.)	(North Carolina) Charlotte FC	Cary, North Carolina
7:00 PM EDT	Washington (yellow card) 59'; Mentzingen 99'	Report	Diani (yellow card) 14'; Toklomati (yellow card) 35'; Tuiloma (yellow card) 36'; Abada 97'; Agyemang 104'; Marshall-Rutty (yellow card) 111'; Petković 119'; Vargas 120+3', (yellow card) 120+4'	Stadium: WakeMed Soccer Park; Attendance: 4,155; Referee: John Matto

May 21 Round of 16	D.C. United (Washington, D.C.)	3–3 (a.e.t.) (2–1 p)	(North Carolina) Charlotte FC	Washington, D.C.
7:30 PM EDT	Schnegg 17'; Enow (yellow card) 39'; Tubbs (yellow card) 52', (goal) 86'; Kijima (yellow card) 57'; Hopkins 104'	Report	Tavares (yellow card) 56'; Agyemang 58'; Tuiloma 61'; Smalls 95'	Stadium: Audi Field; Attendance: 5,179; Referee: Sergii Demianchuk
	Penalties
	Herrera (penalty scored); Hopkins (penalty scored); Stroud (penalty missed); Fletcher (penalty missed); Peltola (penalty missed)		(penalty missed) Malanda; (penalty missed) Biel; (penalty scored) Bronico; (penalty missed) Tavares; (penalty missed) Abada

=== Leagues Cup ===
July 31 Group Stage	Charlotte FC (United States)	1–4	(Mexico) Juárez	Charlotte, North Carolina
7:30 PM EDT	Toklomati 18', (red card) 80'; Marshall-Rutty (yellow card) 37'; Diani (yellow card) 47'; Westwood (yellow card) 52'	Report	Madson 7', 21'; Mosquera 45+2', (yellow card) 81'; Manríquez (yellow card) 54'; Mayorga (yellow card) 89'; Estupiñán 90'; Fulgencio (yellow card) 90+3'	Stadium: Bank of America Stadium; Attendance: 23,677; Referee: Natalie Simon

August 3 Group Stage	Guadalajara (Mexico)	2–2 (4–2 p)	(United States) Charlotte FC	Charlotte, North Carolina
7:50 PM EDT	Ledezma 24', (yellow card) 26'; Sepúlveda (yellow card) 54'; Aguirre (yellow card) 56'; B. González 66'	Report	Abada 11'; Marshall-Rutty (yellow card) 26'; Byrne (yellow card) 76'; Vargas 90'	Stadium: Bank of America Stadium; Attendance: 24,207; Referee: Luis Enrique Santander
	Penalties
	Sepúlveda (penalty scored); Gómez (penalty scored); Romo (penalty missed); Cowell (penalty scored); A. González (penalty scored)		(penalty missed) Williamson; (penalty scored) Petković; (penalty scored) Bronico; (penalty missed) Smalls

August 7 Group Stage	Monterrey (Mexico)	0–2	(United States) Charlotte FC	Charlotte, North Carolina
7:30 PM EDT	Moreno (yellow card) 58'; Valenzuela (yellow card) 75'	Report	Byrne (yellow card) 26'; Tuiloma 56'; Westwood (yellow card) 58'; Smalls 60'	Stadium: Bank of America Stadium; Attendance: 18,877; Referee: Keylor Herrera
