= Adilson Malanda =

French footballer (born 2001)

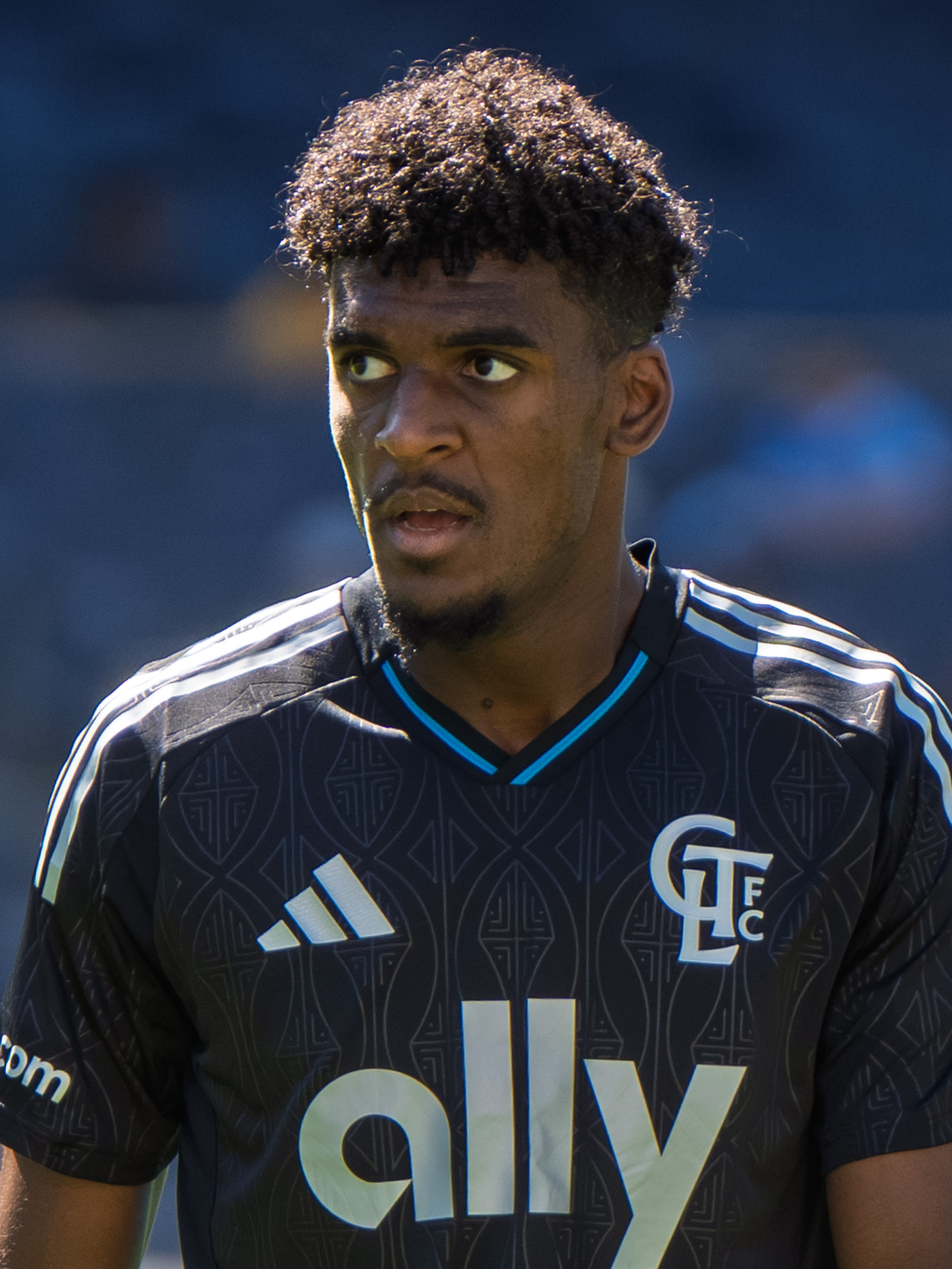
- Malanda with Charlotte FC in 2025

Personal information
- Full name: Adilson Keithe Michel Malanda
- Date of birth: 29 October 2001 (age 25)
- Place of birth: Rouen, France
- Height: 1.94 m (6 ft 4 in)
- Position: Centre-back

Team information
- Current team: Middlesbrough
- Number: 29

Youth career
- –2019: Nîmes

Senior career*
| Years | Team | Apps | (Gls) |
| 2019–2021 | Nîmes II | 15 | (0) |
| 2021–2022 | Rodez | 34 | (0) |
| 2022–2025 | Charlotte FC | 97 | (2) |
| 2025– | Middlesbrough | 36 | (2) |
| 2025 | → Charlotte FC (loan) | 9 | (0) |
- * Club domestic league appearances and goals as of 18:51, 21 November 2026 (UTC)

Adilson Keithe Michel Malanda (born 29 October 2001) is a French professional footballer who plays as a centre-back for EFL Championship club Middlesbrough.

== Career ==
He was born in France to Congolese and Malagasy parents. Malanda made his professional debut with Nîmes.

On 4 August 2022, Malanda signed with Major League Soccer side Charlotte FC.

On 20 August 2025, Malanda signed for EFL Championship club Middlesbrough for an undisclosed fee and was loaned back to Charlotte until the end of the MLS season.

Malanda debuted for Middlesbrough on the 4 January 2026 in their 4-0 win over Southampton and earned the player of the match.

== Personal life ==
Born in France, Malanda is of Congolese descent.

== Career statistics ==
As of match played 21 November 2026

Appearances and goals by club, season and competition
| Club | Season | League | | | National cup (Note: Includes Coupe de France, U.S. Open Cup, FA Cup) | | League cup (Note: Includes EFL Cup) | | Continental | | Total | |
| Club | Season | Division | Apps | Goals | Apps | Goals | Apps | Goals | Apps | Goals | Apps | Goals |
|---|---|---|---|---|---|---|---|---|---|---|---|---|
| Nîmes II | 2018–19 | Championnat National 2 | 1 | 0 | 0 | 0 | — | | — | | 1 | 0 |
| Nîmes II | 2019–20 | Championnat National 2 | 9 | 0 | 0 | 0 | — | | — | | 9 | 0 |
| Nîmes II | 2020–21 | Championnat National 3 | 5 | 0 | 0 | 0 | — | | — | | 5 | 0 |
| Nîmes II | Total | | 15 | 0 | 0 | 0 | — | | — | | 15 | 0 |
| Rodez | 2021–22 | Ligue 2 | 33 | 0 | 1 | 0 | — | | — | | 34 | 0 |
| Rodez | 2022–23 | Ligue 2 | 1 | 0 | 0 | 0 | — | | — | | 1 | 0 |
| Rodez | Total | | 34 | 0 | 1 | 0 | — | | — | | 35 | 0 |
| Charlotte FC | 2022 | Major League Soccer | 6 | 0 | 0 | 0 | — | | — | | 6 | 0 |
| Charlotte FC | 2023 | Major League Soccer | 30 | 0 | 2 | 0 | — | | 4 (Note: Appearances in Leagues Cup) | 0 | 36 | 0 |
| Charlotte FC | 2024 | Major League Soccer | 35 | 1 | 0 | 0 | — | | 2 | 0 | 37 | 1 |
| Charlotte FC | 2025 | Major League Soccer | 26 | 1 | 1 | 0 | — | | — | | 27 | 1 |
| Charlotte FC | Total | | 97 | 2 | 3 | 0 | — | | 6 | 0 | 106 | 2 |
| Middlesbrough | 2025–26 | EFL Championship | 21 | 0 | 1 | 0 | — | | 3 (Note: Appearances in EFL Championship play-offs) | 0 | 25 | 0 |
| Middlesbrough | 2026–27 | EFL Championship | 15 | 2 | 0 | 0 | 2 | 0 | 0 | 0 | 17 | 2 |
| Middlesbrough | Total | | 36 | 2 | 1 | 0 | 2 | 0 | 3 | 0 | 42 | 2 |
| Charlotte FC (loan) | 2025 | Major League Soccer | 9 | 0 | 1 | 0 | — | | 0 | 0 | 10 | 0 |
| Career total | | | 191 | 4 | 5 | 0 | 2 | 0 | 9 | 0 | 207 | 4 |
