= Andrew Privett =

American soccer player (born 2000)

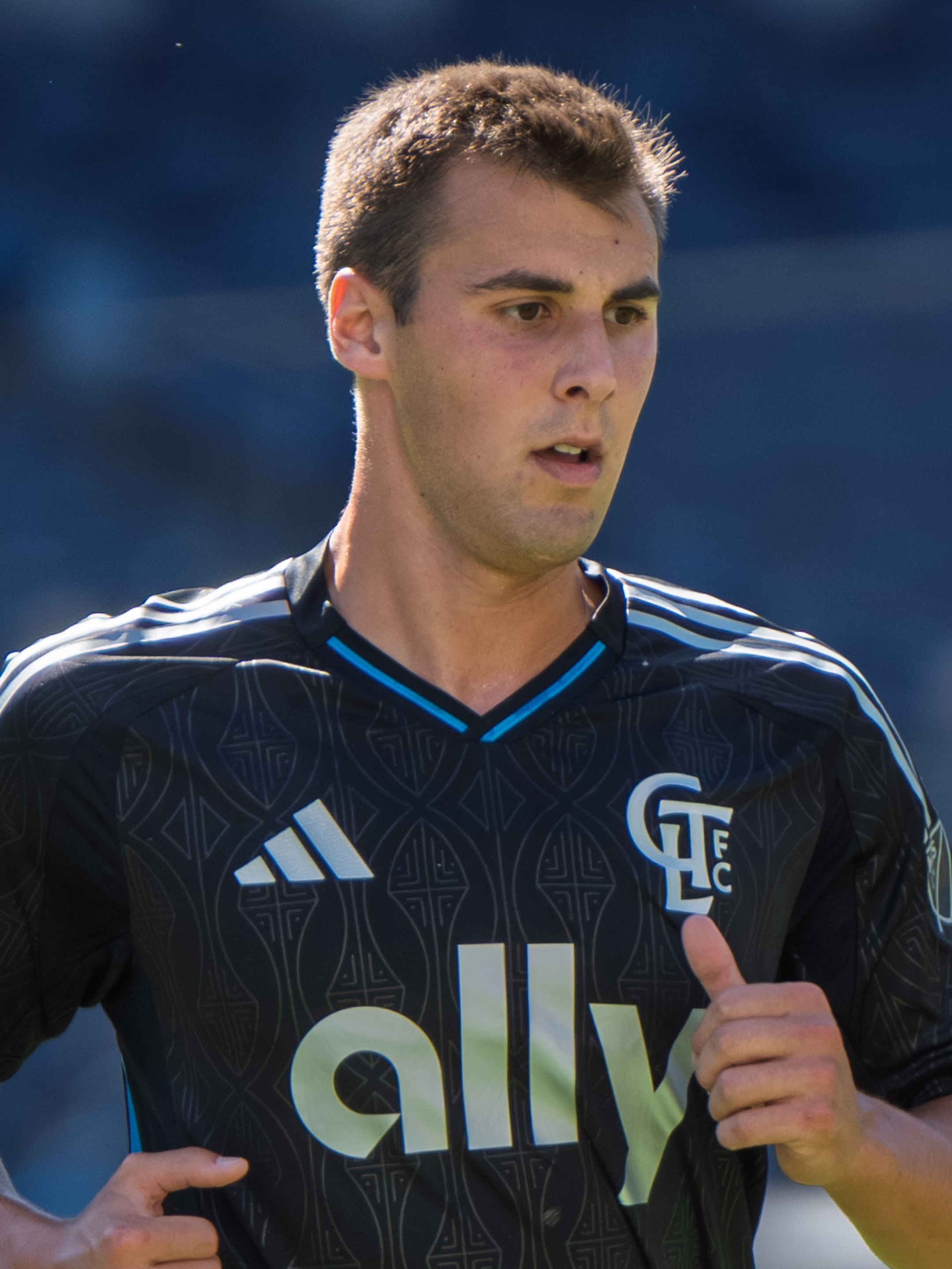
- Privett with Charlotte FC in 2025

Personal information
- Full name: Andrew Dayton Privett
- Date of birth: August 2, 2000 (age 26)
- Place of birth: Fallston, Maryland, United States
- Height: 1.85 m (6 ft 1 in)
- Position: Defender

Team information
- Current team: Charlotte FC
- Number: 4

Youth career
- 2013–2019: Baltimore Armour

College career
Years	Team	Apps	(Gls)
2019–2022	Penn State Nittany Lions	68	(14)

Senior career*
Years	Team	Apps	(Gls)
2021	Ocean City Nor'easters	1	(0)
2022	Christos FC	3	(0)
2023–	Charlotte FC	73	(1)
2023–2024	→ Crown Legacy (loan)	8	(0)
- * Club domestic league appearances and goals as of November 15, 2026

Andrew Dayton Privett (born August 2, 2000) is an American professional soccer player who plays as a defender for Charlotte FC of Major League Soccer.

== Career ==
=== Youth ===
Privett attended the McDonogh School in Owings Mills, Maryland, where he played four seasons of varsity soccer. He helped McDonogh to MIAA championships in 2015, 2017 and 2018. He was named second team All-State and first team All-Metro and All-MIAA during the 2017 season. During the 2018 season Privett was named first team All-State, All-MIAA and All-Metro Boys Soccer Player of the Year as well as earning United Soccer Coaches high school All-Mid-Atlantic Region Team and All-America Team honors. Privett played six seasons with the Baltimore Celtic 2000s in the U.S. Youth Soccer National League and won back-to-back national championships (2017, 2018).

== College and amateur ==
In 2019, Privett attended Pennsylvania State University to play college soccer. In four seasons with the Nittany Lions, Privett made 68 appearances, scoring 14 goals and tallying 13 assists. In his junior season, he was named to All-Big Ten Conference Second Team, and garnered Third Team All-North Region accolades from United Soccer Coaches while leading the Big Ten Conference in goals scored (9).

While at college, Privett also appeared in the USL League Two with Ocean City Nor'easters in 2021, making a single appearance. In 2022, he made three appearances with Christos FC.

== Professional ==
On December 22, 2022, Privett was selected 69th overall in the 2023 MLS SuperDraft by Charlotte FC. On February 24, 2023, Privett signed a professional deal with the Major League Soccer side. He made his first team debut for Charlotte on April 25, 2023, appearing as a 64th-minute substitute during a 4–1 win over USL League One side South Georgia Tormenta in the U.S. Open Cup. In the second half of the 2023 MLS season, Privett transitioned to defense and emerged as a regular starter at center-back.

In 2024, under the management of former Premier League defender Dean Smith, Privett continued to start regularly and earned a new contract through 2028 with an option for 2029. Privett's partnership with Adilson Malanda in central defense helped Charlotte allow the second-fewest goals in the league in 2024.
