= Liel Abada =

Israeli footballer (born 2001)

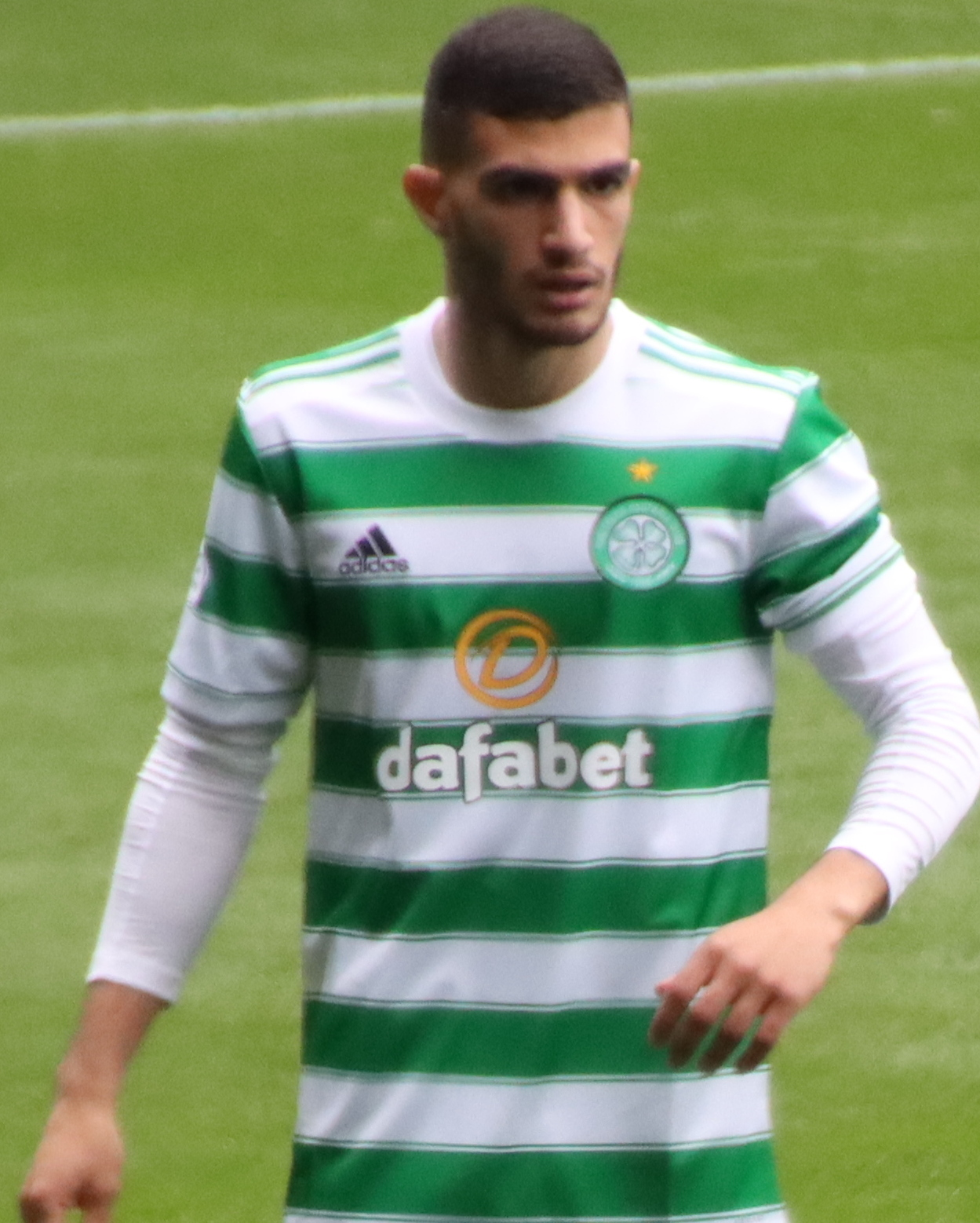
- Abada playing for Celtic in 2021

Personal information
- Date of birth: 3 October 2001 (age 25)
- Place of birth: Petah Tikva, Israel
- Height: 1.72 m (5 ft 8 in)
- Positions: Winger; forward

Team information
- Current team: Charlotte FC
- Number: 11

Youth career
- 2006–2014: Hapoel Petah Tikva
- 2014–2019: Maccabi Petah Tikva

Senior career*
Years	Team	Apps	(Gls)
2019–2021	Maccabi Petah Tikva	67	(20)
2021–2024	Celtic	79	(21)
2024–	Charlotte FC	83	(22)

International career^{‡}
2017	Israel U16	6	(1)
2017–2018	Israel U17	21	(2)
2018	Israel U18	4	(0)
2018–2019	Israel U19	12	(4)
2020–2022	Israel U21	8	(1)
2021–	Israel	22	(1)
- * Club domestic league appearances and goals as of 19:46, 15 November 2026 (UTC) ‡ National team caps and goals as of 15:52, 14 November 2026 (UTC)

Liel Abada (Hebrew: ליאל עבדה, /lɪˈɛl/ lih-EL; born 3 October 2001) is an Israeli professional footballer who plays as a winger or a forward for Major League Soccer side Charlotte FC and the Israel national team.

== Early and personal life ==
Abada was born in Petah Tikva, Israel, to a family of Mizrahi Jewish descent. At the age of 13, his first manager in Maccabi Petah Tikva took Abada's father Ronen and him to celebrate his Bar Mitzvah in Barcelona. His younger brother Orel Abada is also a footballer who plays for Hapoel Ra'anana. Abada is observant and does not play football on the Jewish high holiday of Yom Kippur.

Except for a three-month period in 2022, he has been in a relationship with Israeli Bar Rashti since 2020.

== Club career ==
=== Maccabi Petah Tikva ===
Abada made his professional debut for Maccabi Petah Tikva in the Israel State Cup on 22 August 2019, coming on as a 63rd minute substitute against Hakoah Amidar Ramat Gan, in a match that ended in a 4–1 home win for his team. On 9 September 2019, he scored his first senior Israeli Liga Leumit goal in the 90th minute against Bnei Sakhnin, that finished as a 1–1 home draw for Maccabi Petah Tikva. On 30 August 2020, Abada scored his first Israeli Premier League goal, which coincided with his team's 86th minute winning goal, earning his side a 1–2 away victory over Maccabi Tel Aviv.

=== Celtic ===
On 14 July 2021, Scottish Premiership club Celtic announced the signing of Abada on a five-year contract, for a reported fee of £3.6 million. On 20 July 2021, he scored on his debut in the first leg of Celtic's Champions League second round qualifying match against Danish side Midtjylland, that ended in a 1–1 home draw. On 21 August 2021, in his third Scottish Premiership appearance, Abada scored both his and Celtic's first two league goals, that led to a 6–0 home victory over St. Mirren. On 4 November 2021, he scored the winning goal for Celtic in a 2021–22 UEFA Europea League Group stage match against Hungarian side Ferencváros. On 26 December 2021, Abada netted an early brace in a 2021–22 Scottish Premiership match against St. Johnstone, earning his team a 1–3 away win. Abada won the PFA Scotland Young Player of the Year award for 2021–22.

On 28 August 2022, Abada scored a hat-trick and assisted one goal, in a 9–0 away win against Dundee United in the 2022–23 Scottish Premiership. On 3 September 2022, he scored both the first and third goal against Rangers in an Old Firm derby league match, that ended in a 4–0 home win for Celtic. Abada made his debut UEFA Champions League Group stage appearance on 6 September 2022, opening against Spanish side Real Madrid. On 19 October 2022, he scored a brace in the span of 11 minutes and later on added an assist against Motherwell in the 2022–23 Scottish League Cup quarter-finals, to lead his team to a 4–0 away victory. In January 2023, Abada was featured in the official 40-man list composed by UEFA.com – which named the best young players in the continent that: "have the potential to take European football by storm in 2023".

On 1 September 2023, Abada signed a new four-year contract with Celtic. His career with Celtic was affected by the Gaza war, as the Green Brigade fans group demonstrated their support for the Palestinians. Abada met with Celtic senior management after these displays, which had led to him being criticised in Israel, and Celtic issued a statement saying that it was "inappropriate" for the fans to show those messages. Abada was injured at the time the war started, and he returned to the team in December. Celtic manager Brendan Rodgers said in February 2024 that it was "challenging" for Abada to produce his best form in the circumstances, and then confirmed that Abada could leave the club. On 8 March 2024, Abada left Celtic for a fee of $8 million, around £6 million.

=== Charlotte FC ===
Abada moved to Major League Soccer club Charlotte FC on 8 March 2024.

== International career ==
He also plays for Israel's U-21 since 2020.

Abada was first called up to the Israeli senior side on 18 March 2021, ahead of the 2022 FIFA World Cup qualification (UEFA). He made his senior debut with the Israel national team on 5 June 2021, in a friendly match against Montenegro, where he substituted Yonas Malede in the 61st minute with the score at 0–0; the game ended with a 3–1 away victory for Israel. He scored his first senior goal against Iceland, during a 2022–23 UEFA Nations League match on 2 June 2022, which ended in a 2–2 home draw for his native Israel.

=== 2024 Summer Olympics ===
Abada was selected for Israel's squad to compete in the men's football at the 2024 Summer Olympics.

== Career statistics ==
=== Club ===
As of match played 14 September 2025

Appearances and goals by club, season and competition
Club	Season	League			National cup (Note: Includes Israel State Cup, Scottish Cup, U.S. Open Cup)		League cup (Note: Includes Toto Cup, Scottish League Cup, Leagues Cup)		Continental		Total	
Club	Season	Division	Apps	Goals	Apps	Goals	Apps	Goals	Apps	Goals	Apps	Goals
Maccabi Petah Tikva	2018–19	Israeli Premier League	2	0	1	0	0	0	–		3	0
Maccabi Petah Tikva	2019–20	Israeli Premier League	29	8	5	0	0	0	–		34	8
Maccabi Petah Tikva	2020–21	Israeli Premier League	36	12	2	1	4	0	–		42	13
Maccabi Petah Tikva	Total		67	20	8	1	4	0	–		79	21
Celtic	2021–22	Scottish Premiership	36	10	3	1	3	1	12 (Note: Two appearances and one goal in UEFA Champions League, eight appearances and two goals in UEFA Europa League, two appearances in UEFA Europa Conference League)	3	54	15
Celtic	2022–23	Scottish Premiership	34	10	4	1	4	2	5 (Note: Appearances in UEFA Champions League)	0	47	13
Celtic	2023–24	Scottish Premiership	9	1	1	0	1	0	0	0	11	1
Celtic	Total		79	21	8	2	8	3	17	3	112	29
Charlotte FC	2024	Major League Soccer	27	7	–		–		–		27	7
Charlotte FC	2025	Major League Soccer	28	5	2	1	3	0	–		33	6
Charlotte FC	Total		55	12	2	1	3	0	–		60	13
Career total			201	53	18	4	15	3	17	3	251	63

=== International ===
As of 14 November 2026

National team	Year	Apps	Goals
Israel	2021	4	0
Israel	2022	5	1
Israel	2023	1	0
Israel	2024	5	0
Israel	2025	3	0
Israel	2026	4	0
Total		22	1

Scores and results list Israel's goal tally first, score column indicates score after each Abada goal.

List of international goals scored by Liel Abada
#	Date	Venue	Opponent	Score	Result	Competition
1.	2 June 2022	Sammy Ofer Stadium, Haifa, Israel	Iceland	1–0	2–2	2022–23 UEFA Nations League B

== Honours ==
Maccabi Petah Tikva U20

- Israeli Noar Premier League: 2018–19

Maccabi Petah Tikva

- Liga Leumit: 2019–20

Celtic

- Scottish Premiership: 2021–22, 2022–23
- Scottish Cup: 2022–23
- Scottish League Cup: 2021–22 2022–23

Individual

- PFA Scotland Young Player of the Year: 2021–22

== See also ==
- List of Jewish footballers
- List of Jews in Sports
- List of Israelis
- Nir Bitton
