= Idan Toklomati =

Israeli footballer (born 2004)

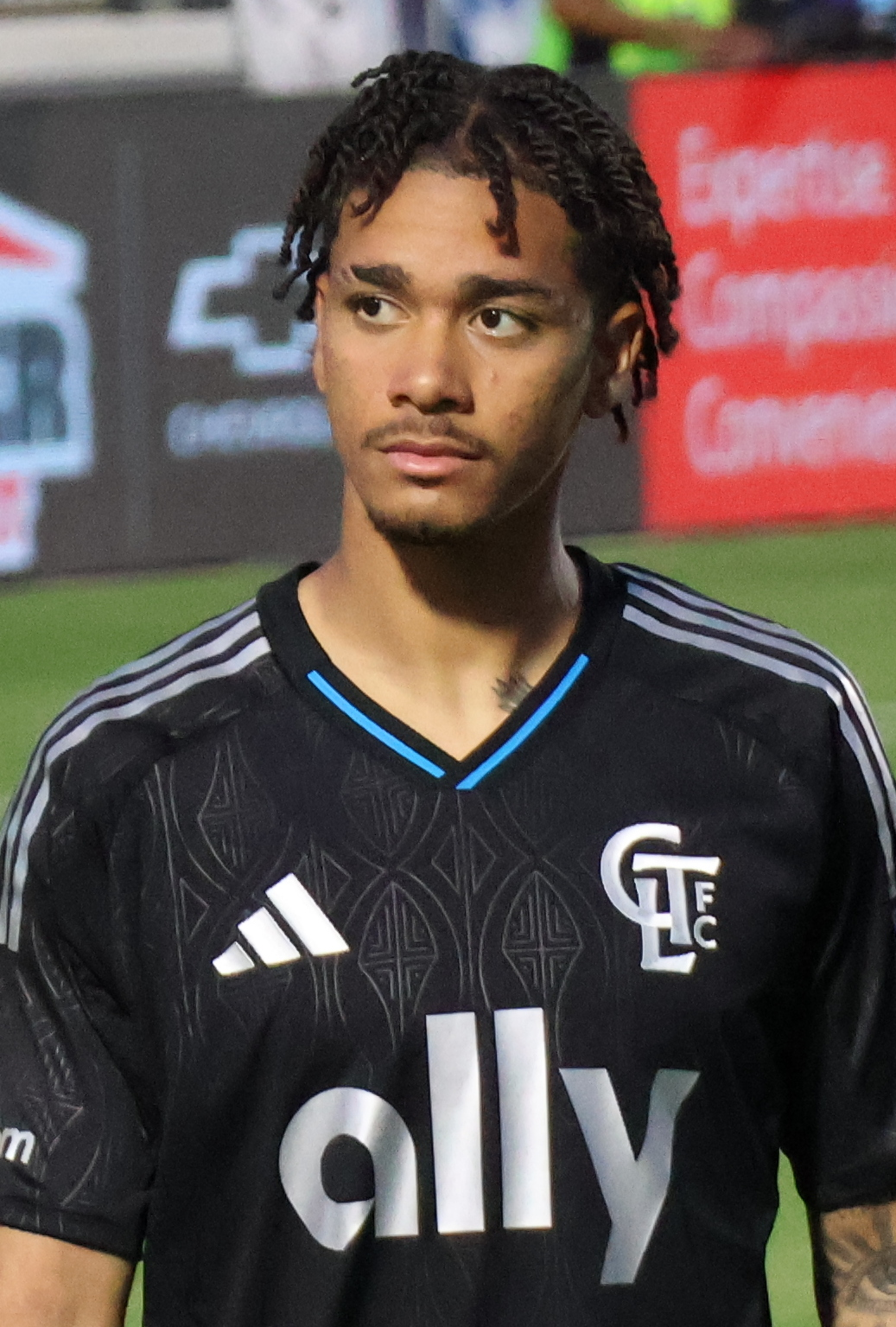
- Toklomati with Charlotte FC in 2025

Personal information
- Date of birth: 9 August 2004 (age 22)
- Place of birth: Netanya, Israel
- Height: 1.85 m (6 ft 1 in)
- Positions: Forward; winger

Team information
- Current team: Charlotte FC
- Number: 9

Youth career
- 2012–2021: Beitar Nes Tubruk
- 2021–2024: Maccabi Petah Tikva

Senior career*
Years	Team	Apps	(Gls)
2022–2024	Maccabi Petah Tikva	63	(16)
2024	Crown Legacy FC	7	(3)
2024–	Charlotte FC	62	(26)

International career^{‡}
2021	Israel U18	2	(0)
2021–2023	Israel U19	14	(0)
2022–	Israel U21	9	(1)
2023–	Israel	10	(0)
Medal record
Representing Israel U-19
UEFA European Under-19 Championship
Runner-up	2022 Slovakia	Team
- * Club domestic league appearances and goals as of 19:46, 15 November 2026 (UTC) ‡ National team caps and goals as of 21:00, 17 November 2026 (UTC)

Idan Toklomati-Jorno (Hebrew: עידן טוקלומטי-ג'ורנו; born 9 August 2004) is an Israeli professional footballer who plays as a forward or winger for Major League Soccer club Charlotte FC and the Israel national team.

== Early life ==
Toklomati was born in Netanya, Israel. His father Tony Toklomety is a Beninese former professional footballer who played for Maccabi Netanya and the Benin national football team; whereas his mother Iris Gorno is an Israeli Jewish journalist.

Toklomati began his career in 2012, at eight years old, joining the youth setup of Beitar Nes Tubruk in his hometown of Netanya. In 2021, Toklomati switched to the youth side of Maccabi Petah Tikva, where he finished his youth career.

== Club career ==
=== Maccabi Petah Tikva ===
Toklomati made his senior debut for Maccabi Petah Tikva on 23 April 2022, in a 0–4 loss against Hapoel Nof HaGalil in the Israeli Premier League.

=== Charlotte FC ===
On 21 August 2024, Toklomati joined MLS club Charlotte FC, initially playing for their MLS Next Pro reserve side Crown Legacy FC. He scored three goals in three MLS Next Pro games, and was promoted to the first team squad in September 2024, signing a first team contract until 2027, with a club option for 2028. Toklomati scored his first career hat-trick on 13 September 2025 in a 3–0 victory against Inter Miami.

== International career ==
Toklomati plays for both the Israel national under-19 football team and the Israel national under-21 football team. He was a part of the Israel squad that finished runner-up in the 2022 UEFA European Under-19 Championship. Due to his heritage, Toklomati has dual Israeli-Beninese citizenship, and was eligible to play for Israel or Benin. On November 12, 2023, Toklomati made his international debut for Israel as a 72nd-minute substitute in a 1–0 defeat to Kosovo for the UEFA Euro 2024 qualifiers.

== Career statistics ==
As of match played 14 September 2025

Club	Season	League			National cup (Note: Includes Israel State Cup, U.S. Open Cup)		League cup (Note: Includes Toto Cup)		Other		Total	
Club	Season	Division	Apps	Goals	Apps	Goals	Apps	Goals	Apps	Goals	Apps	Goals
Maccabi Petah Tikva	2021–22	Israeli Premier League	2	0	0	0	0	0	–		2	0
Maccabi Petah Tikva	2022–23	Liga Leumit	30	11	3	1	0	0	–		33	12
Maccabi Petah Tikva	2023–24	Israeli Premier League	31	5	3	0	5	0	–		39	5
Maccabi Petah Tikva	Total		63	16	6	1	5	0	–		74	17
Charlotte	2024	MLS	1	0	–		–		–		1	0
Charlotte	2025	MLS	33	12	1	0	0	0	2 (Note: Appearances in Leagues Cup)	1	29	12
Charlotte	Total		27	11	1	0	0	0	2	1	30	12
Career total			90	27	7	1	5	0	2	1	104	29

== See also ==
- List of Israelis
- Football in Benin
