= Tyger Smalls =

English footballer (born 2002)

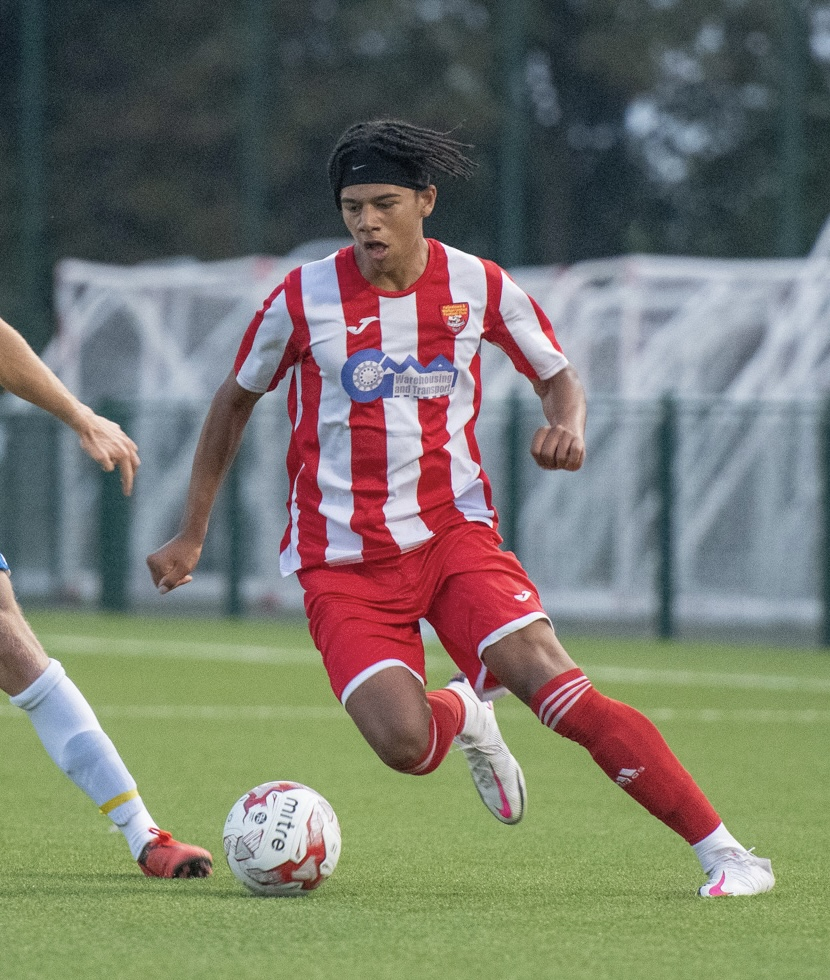
- Smalls playing for Felixstowe & Walton United FC

Personal information
- Date of birth: 18 September 2002 (age 24)
- Place of birth: London, England
- Height: 6 ft 1 in (1.85 m)
- Position: Winger

Team information
- Current team: Charlotte FC
- Number: 25

Youth career
- Norwich City
- Tottenham Hotspur
- Red Lodge FC
- Mundford FC
- Whitton United
- Felixstowe & Walton United
- Billericay Town
- Stowmarket Town
- Needham Market
- Histon

College career
Years	Team	Apps	(Gls)
2021–2022	Tyler Apaches	36	(26)
2023	Loyola Marymount Lions	20	(7)

Senior career*
Years	Team	Apps	(Gls)
2019	Haverhill Rovers	19	(12)
2019–2020	Saffron Walden Town	8	(1)
2020–2021	Felixstowe & Walton United	2	(0)
2024–	Charlotte FC	48	(0)
2024–	→ Crown Legacy FC (loan)	12	(1)
- * Club domestic league appearances and goals as of November 15, 2026

Tyger Smalls (born 18 September 2002) is an English professional footballer who plays as a winger for Major League Soccer club Charlotte FC.

== Early life ==
Smalls played youth football with Norwich City academy, later moving to the Tottenham Hotspur academy. Afterwards, he played with Red Lodge FC, Mundford FC, Whitton United, Felixstowe & Walton United, Billericay Town, Stowmarket Town Needham Market, and Histon. In 2020, he had a trial with the Arsenal U23 team.

== College career ==
In 2021, Smalls began attending Tyler Junior College in the United States, where he played for the men's soccer team, where he spent two seasons. On 17 November 2021, he scored a double overtime winning goal to help them reach the knockout rounds of the NCJAA national tournament. In 2022, he was named to the United Soccer Coaches All-America Junior College Team and the NJCAA All-America Third Team.

In 2023, he transferred to Loyola Marymount University to play for the men's soccer team in the NCAA. On 2 September 2023, he scored a brace in a 2–2 draw with the California Baptist Lancers. On 17 November, he scored another brace in a victory over the UC Irvine Anteaters in the first round of the NCAA tournament. He scored the only goal in a 1–0 victory over the UCLA Bruins on 19 November to help Loyola reach the Sweet Sixteen for the first time in school history.

== Club career ==
In August 2019, Smalls signed with the Haverhill Rovers in the Eastern Counties Premier. He made his debut for the club on 6 August 2019 in a league match against Godmanchester Rovers, followed by becoming the club's youngest ever player to play in an FA Cup match on 10 August against Colney Heath. He scored 15 goals in 24 matches for the club.

In December 2019, he joined Saffron Walden Town in the Essex Senior League.

In September 2020, he signed with Felixstowe & Walton United. He scored in a pre-season match off of a free kick against Lowestoft Town.

At the 2024 MLS SuperDraft, Smalls was selected in the first round (14th overall) by Charlotte FC. In February 2024, he signed a contract with the Major League Soccer club for the 2024 season, with club options from 2025 through 2027. On 27 April, he made his Major League Soccer debut, in a substitute appearance, against New York City FC.

== Career statistics ==
As of 22 October 2025

Club	Season	League			Playoffs		National cup		Other		Total	
Club	Season	Division	Apps	Goals	Apps	Goals	Apps	Goals	Apps	Goals	Apps	Goals
Haverhill Rovers	2019–20	Eastern Counties FL - Premier	19	12	–		1	0	4	3	24	15
Saffron Walden Town	2019–20	Essex Senior FL	8	1	–		0	0	1	0	9	1
Felixstowe & Walton United	2020–21	Isthmian League - North Division	2	0	–		1	0	1	0	4	0
Charlotte FC	2024	Major League Soccer	15	0	0	0	–		2	0	17	0
Charlotte FC	2025	Major League Soccer	14	0	0	0	2	1	3	1	19	2
Charlotte FC	Total		29	0	0	0	2	1	5	1	36	2
Crown Legacy FC (loan)	2024	MLS Next Pro	11	1	2	1	0	0	–		13	2
Crown Legacy FC (loan)	2025	MLS Next Pro	1	0	–		–		–		1	0
Crown Legacy FC (loan)	Total		12	1	2	1	0	0	0	0	14	2
Career total			70	14	2	1	2	1	11	4	85	20

== Personal life ==
Smalls is the older brother of fellow footballer Magic Smalls.
