= Nathan Byrne =

English footballer (born 1992)

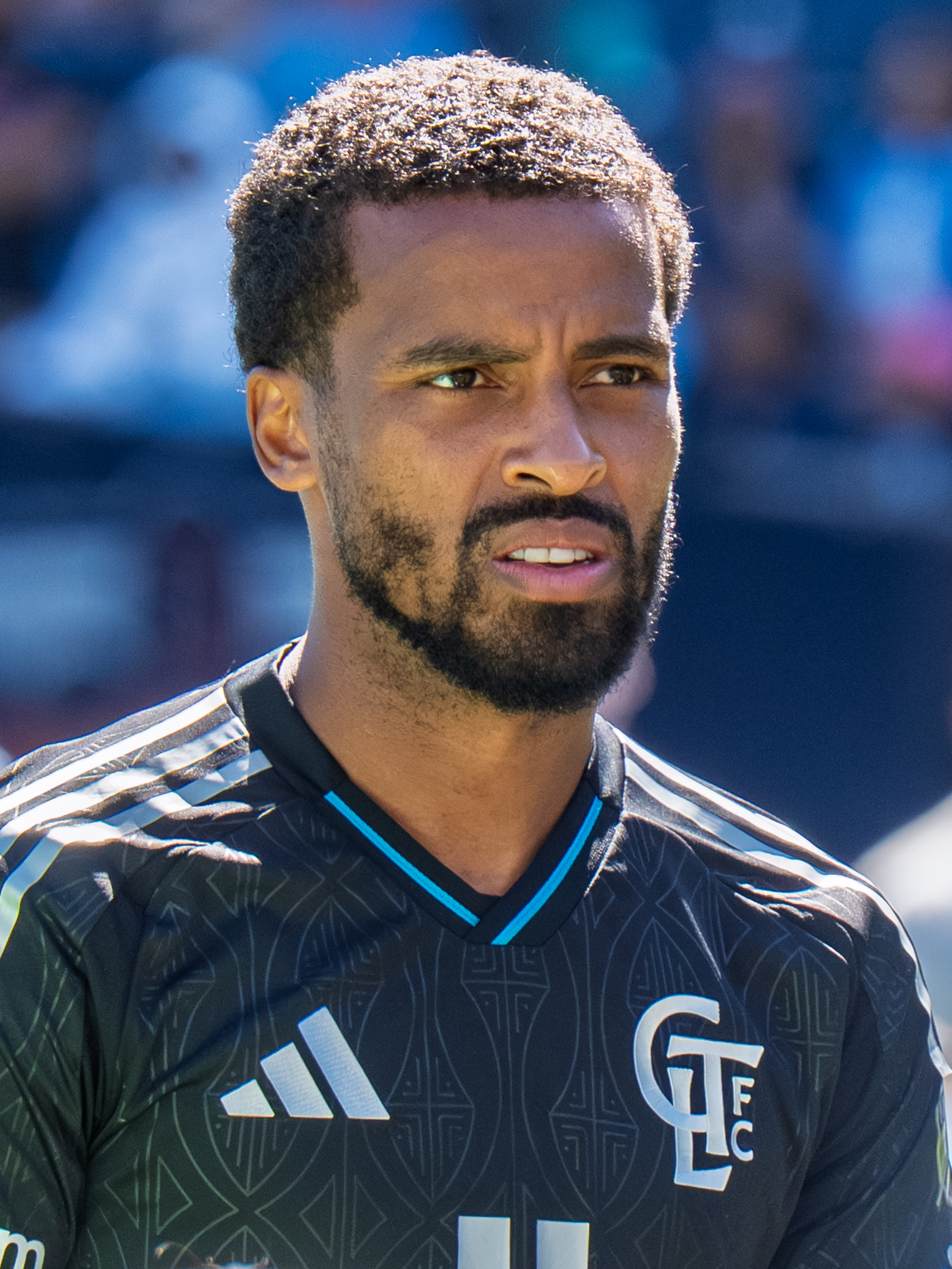
- Byrne with Charlotte FC in 2025

Personal information
- Full name: Nathan William Byrne
- Date of birth: 5 June 1992 (age 34)
- Place of birth: St Albans, England
- Height: 5 ft 6 in (1.68 m)
- Positions: Right-back; wing back

Team information
- Current team: Charlotte FC
- Number: 14

Youth career
- St Albans City
- 2008–2010: Tottenham Hotspur

Senior career*
Years	Team	Apps	(Gls)
2010–2013	Tottenham Hotspur	0	(0)
2011	→ Brentford (loan)	11	(0)
2011–2012	→ Bournemouth (loan)	9	(0)
2012–2013	→ Crawley Town (loan)	12	(1)
2013	→ Swindon Town (loan)	7	(0)
2013–2015	Swindon Town	83	(10)
2015–2016	Wolverhampton Wanderers	24	(2)
2016–2020	Wigan Athletic	127	(2)
2017	→ Charlton Athletic (loan)	17	(1)
2020–2022	Derby County	82	(0)
2022–	Charlotte FC	114	(0)
- * Club domestic league appearances and goals as of 20:38, 15 November 2026 (UTC)

Nathan William Byrne (born 5 June 1992) is an English professional footballer who plays for Charlotte FC. He can play as either a wing back or a right-back.

Byrne began his professional career with Tottenham but never made a first team appearance for the club before leaving to join League One Swindon Town in 2013. After two full seasons with the Robins, during which they reached the 2015 League One play-off final, he was bought by Championship side Wolverhampton Wanderers. However, he only remained with the club for a year before moving on to Wigan Athletic.

== Career ==
=== Tottenham Hotspur ===
Byrne played for St Albans City as a youth player, before becoming a Tottenham Hotspur player, signing professional forms in June 2010.

In February 2011, he was loaned out to Brentford of League One. He made his senior debut on 26 February, replacing Myles Weston 77 minutes into a 1–0 home win over Bristol Rovers. He won his first start at Griffin Park on 8 March, playing in a 1–0 defeat to Brighton & Hove Albion. He was singled out for praise for his performance against Brighton by manager Nicky Forster.

On 28 July 2011, English League One club Bournemouth signed Byrne on loan until the end of the season. In a match against Exeter on 17 September 2011 Byrne suffered an ankle injury that would keep him out of action until the new year, he chose to remain at Bournemouth for treatment. On 22 February 2012, Byrne was recalled to Tottenham having made his return from injury in a Spurs XI friendly the day before.

Byrne was signed by Crawley Town on loan on 24 September 2012 until 6 January 2013. He made 14 starts and 1 substitute appearance, scoring once, his first ever league goal, at Carlisle United on 29 September 2012.

=== Swindon Town (loan and permanent transfer) ===
On 28 March 2013, Byrne signed for Swindon Town on a loan deal that would see him at the County Ground for the rest of the 2012–13 season.

On 26 April 2013, Nathan agreed to sign for Swindon Town on a free transfer following a successful loan spell at the club from Tottenham Hotspur. During the second leg of the League One playoffs against Brentford, he received a red card during extra time after Swindon equalised late in the first half to make the score 3–3.

Byrne made 43 league appearances during the 2014–15 season and helped Swindon make the play-offs. having contributed 3 goals and 9 assists in the league, he also made the League One team of the year.

During the first leg of the League One play-off semi final against Sheffield United away, he scored the winning goal for Swindon on 93 minutes to make the score 2–1 and carry a one-goal advantage back to the County Ground.

Byrne scored a hat-trick on the opening day of the 2015–16 season in a 4–1 win against Bradford City.

=== Wolverhampton Wanderers ===
On 1 September 2015 Byrne joined Championship club Wolverhampton Wanderers, signing a three-year contract (with the option of a fourth year) for an undisclosed fee. He made his club debut on 19 September 2015 as a substitute in a goalless draw against Brighton, with his first start coming later that month in a 3–0 win at Fulham. Byrne scored his first goal for the club on 17 December, a late consolation in a 2–3 home loss to Leeds United. His second and final goal for the club also came at Molineux, when he opened the scoring in a 2–1 win over Bristol City on 8 March 2016. What was to be his final appearance for the club came as a late substitute in a 1–1 draw at eventual champions Burnley on 19 March, where his last-minute corner was headed in by Danny Batth. He made 24 appearances in total for the club.

=== Wigan Athletic ===
On 31 August 2016, almost a year after joining Wolves and having not featured under new coach Walter Zenga, Byrne departed to join newly promoted Championship side Wigan Athletic for an undisclosed fee in a three-year deal.

On 9 January 2017 it was announced that Byrne had joined League One side Charlton Athletic on loan for the remainder of the season. He scored his first goal for the club in a 2–1 win over Bolton Wanderers on 28 January 2017.

In January 2019, Byrne agreed a new contract with Wigan, which was valid to summer 2021.

In April 2019 Byrne was subjected to racist tweets, with the police arresting a man from Sheffield as a result.

=== Derby County ===
On 10 September 2020 Byrne joined Championship club Derby County, signing a two-year contract until the summer of 2022 for an undisclosed fee. A further one-year contract extension clause was triggered at the end of the 2021-22 season.

In July 2022, Byrne cancelled his contract with Derby County without the club’s consent following the club’s exit from administration. This was permitted under UK employment law relating to the Transfer of Undertakings (Protection of Employment) Regulations (TUPE), which apply when employees transfer to a new employer.

=== Charlotte FC ===
On 4 August 2022, Byrne signed for Major League Soccer club Charlotte FC on a two-year contract with the option for a further year. On 25 September 2024, Byrne signed a contract extension to the end of the 2026 season with the club having an option for a further year.

== Career statistics ==
As of match played 1 November 2025

Appearances and goals by club, season and competition
Club	Season	League			National cup		League Cup		Continental		Other		Total	
Club	Season	Division	Apps	Goals	Apps	Goals	Apps	Goals	Apps	Goals	Apps	Goals	Apps	Goals
Tottenham Hotspur	2010–11	Premier League	0	0	0	0	0	0	0	0	—		0	0
Tottenham Hotspur	2011–12	Premier League	0	0	0	0	0	0	0	0	—		0	0
Tottenham Hotspur	2012–13	Premier League	0	0	0	0	0	0	0	0	—		0	0
Tottenham Hotspur	Total		0	0	0	0	0	0	0	0	—		0	0
Brentford (loan)	2010–11	League One	11	0	—		—		—		0	0	11	0
Bournemouth (loan)	2011–12	League One	9	0	0	0	2	0	—		1 (Note: Appearance(s) in Football League Trophy)	0	12	0
Crawley Town (loan)	2012–13	League One	12	1	1	0	1	0	—		1	0	15	1
Swindon Town (loan)	2012–13	League One	7	0	—		—		—		2 (Note: Appearance(s) in League One play-offs)	0	9	0
Swindon Town	2013–14	League One	36	4	1	0	2	0	—		4	0	43	4
Swindon Town	2014–15	League One	42	3	1	0	2	0	—		4 (Note: One appearance in Football League Trophy; Three appearances, one goal in League One play-offs)	1	49	4
Swindon Town	2015–16	League One	5	3	—		1	0	—		0	0	6	3
Swindon Town	Total		83	10	2	0	5	0	—		8	1	98	11
Wolverhampton Wanderers	2015–16	Championship	24	2	0	0	0	0	—		—		24	2
Wigan Athletic	2016–17	Championship	14	0	0	0	0	0	—		—		14	0
Wigan Athletic	2017–18	League One	44	0	7	0	0	0	—		0	0	51	0
Wigan Athletic	2018–19	Championship	30	1	1	0	0	0	—		—		31	1
Wigan Athletic	2019–20	Championship	39	1	0	0	0	0	—		—		39	1
Wigan Athletic	2020–21	League One	0	0	—		1	0	—		—		1	0
Wigan Athletic	Total		127	2	8	0	0	0	—		0	0	135	4
Charlton Athletic (loan)	2016–17	League One	17	1	—		—		—		—		17	1
Derby County	2020–21	Championship	41	0	0	0	0	0	—		—		41	0
Derby County	2021–22	Championship	41	0	0	0	0	0	—		—		41	0
Derby County	Total		82	0	0	0	0	0	—		—		82	0
Charlotte FC	2022	MLS	5	0	—		—		—		—		5	0
Charlotte FC	2023	MLS	31	0	0	0	—		4 (Note: Appearance(s) in Leagues Cup)	0	1 (Note: Appearance(s) in MLS Cup playoffs)	0	36	0
Charlotte FC	2024	MLS	31	0	0	0	—		1	0	3	0	35	0
Charlotte FC	2025	MLS	17	0	0	0	—		3	0	2	0	22	0
Charlotte FC	Total		84	0	0	0	—		8	0	6	0	98	0
Career total			456	16	11	0	9	0	8	0	18	1	502	17

== Honours ==
Brentford

- Football League Trophy runner-up: 2010–11

Wigan Athletic

- EFL League One: 2017–18

Individual

- PFA Team of the Year: 2014–15 League One, 2017–18 League One
- EFL Team of the Season: 2017–18
- Wigan Athletic Player of the Year: 2017–18
- Wigan Athletic Players' Player of the Year: 2017–18
