= Pep Biel =

Spanish footballer (born 1996)

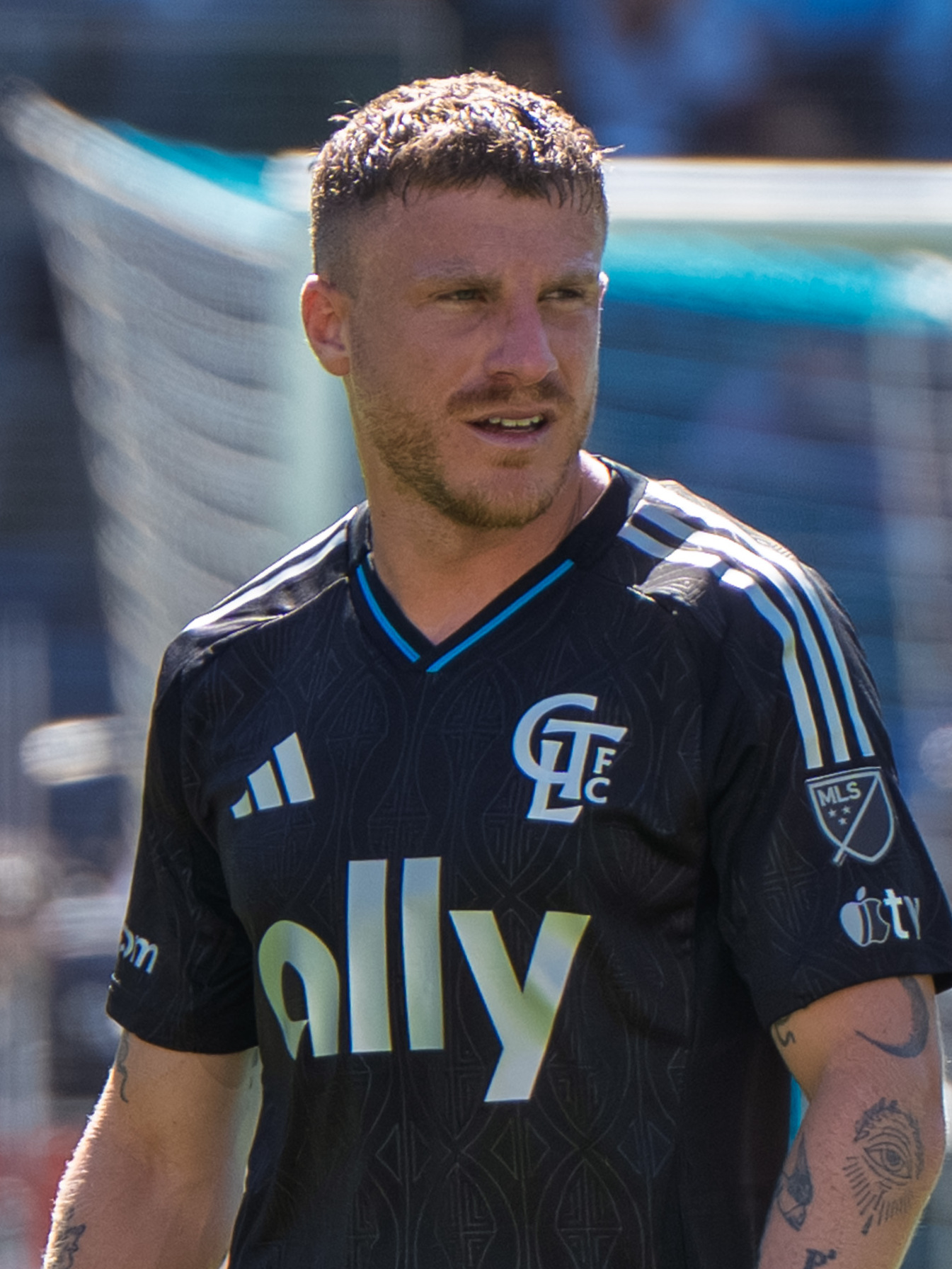
- Pep Biel with Charlotte FC in 2025

Personal information
- Full name: Pep Biel Mas Jaume
- Date of birth: 5 September 1996 (age 30)
- Place of birth: Sant Joan, Spain
- Height: 1.72 m (5 ft 8 in)
- Positions: Attacking midfielder; winger

Team information
- Current team: Charlotte FC
- Number: 16

Youth career
- Constància
- 2013–2015: Rayo Vallecano

Senior career*
Years	Team	Apps	(Gls)
2012	Constància	1	(0)
2014	Rayo Vallecano B	2	(0)
2015–2016	Llosetense	15	(0)
2016–2017	Mallorca B	0	(0)
2016–2017	→ Almudévar (loan)	37	(13)
2017–2018	Zaragoza B	31	(2)
2018–2019	Zaragoza	23	(6)
2019–2022	Copenhagen	95	(23)
2022–2026	Olympiacos	43	(10)
2024	→ Augsburg (loan)	11	(0)
2024–2025	→ Charlotte FC (loan)	35	(12)
2026–	Charlotte FC	34	(13)
- * Club domestic league appearances and goals as of 20:39, 15 November 2026 (UTC)

Pep Biel Mas Jaume (born 5 September 1996) is a Spanish professional footballer who plays as an attacking midfielder and winger for Major League Soccer club Charlotte FC.

== Career ==
=== Early career ===
Biel was born in Sant Joan, Majorca, Balearic Islands, and started his career with CE Constància. On 16 December 2012, aged only 16, he made his first team debut by coming on as a second-half substitute in a 1–0 Segunda División B home loss against CE L'Hospitalet.

In 2013 Biel moved to Rayo Vallecano, returning to the youth setup. In July 2015, after finishing his formation and having appeared rarely for the B-team, he joined CD Llosetense also in the third division.

On 14 June 2016, Biel signed for another reserve team, RCD Mallorca B in the third division. On 17 August, however, he was loaned to Tercera División side AD Almudévar for the season.

=== Zaragoza ===
On 12 July 2017, Biel agreed to a two-year contract with Real Zaragoza, being assigned to the reserves in the division three. The following 19 January he made his professional debut, replacing Alberto Zapater in a 2–1 away loss against Granada CF in the Segunda División.

On 21 May 2018 Biel renewed his contract until 2022, and was definitely promoted to the first team ahead of the 2018–19 season. He scored his first professional goal on 12 November, netting his team's second in a 3–1 away defeat of Gimnàstic de Tarragona.

A regular starter under new manager Víctor Fernández, Biel scored a brace in a 3–3 draw at Cádiz CF on 8 April 2019. He finished the season with six goals in 21 appearances, as his side avoided relegation.

=== Copenhagen ===
On 1 August 2019, Danish Superliga side FC Copenhagen announced that they had agreed a fee with Zaragoza and that Biel would undergo a medical in Denmark with the intention of an immediate transfer. Two days later, he signed a five-year contract with the club.

Biel made his debut abroad on 3 August 2019, replacing Viktor Fischer in a 2–1 away defeat of SønderjyskE.

On 27 February 2020, Biel scored in the final minutes to defeat Scottish champions Celtic and help the club advance to the round of 16 in the Europa League.

On 8 August 2021, Biel scored the final goal in a 4–2 derby win against Brøndby. On 7 September, Biel was named the Superliga Player of the Month for August 2021 after scoring five goals and providing two assists in five matches. On 22 May 2022 with the club he won the Danish Superliga in the season 2021–22 been the first title in his career and he has been elected Copenhagen Player of the Season for the season 2021–22.

Biel started the 2022–23 campaign in strong fashion, scoring four goals in four league games including a hat-trick against rivals Brøndby on 7 August 2022; the first hat-trick ever scored in a Copenhagen Derby.

=== Olympiacos ===
==== Loan to Augsburg ====
On 1 February 2024, Biel joined German club Augsburg on loan for the rest of the season, with an option to buy.

==== Loan to Charlotte FC ====
On 15 August 2024, Biel signed with Major League Soccer side Charlotte FC on loan until 31 December 2024. Charlotte declined his contract option following their 2024 season. On 13 January 2025, Biel and Charlotte extended his loan with the club until 1 August 2025.

=== Charlotte FC ===
Biel's stay at Charlotte was made permanent following their 2025 season.

== Career statistics ==
As of match played 20 September 2025

Appearances and goals by club, season and competition
Club	Season	League			National cup (Note: Includes Copa del Rey, Danish Cup, Greek Football Cup)		Europe		Other		Total	
Club	Season	Division	Apps	Goals	Apps	Goals	Apps	Goals	Apps	Goals	Apps	Goals
Zaragoza	2017–18	Segunda División	2	0	0	0	—		—		2	0
Zaragoza	2018–19	Segunda División	21	6	1	0	—		—		22	6
Zaragoza	Total		23	6	1	0	—		—		24	6
Copenhagen	2019–20	Danish Superliga	29	4	3	0	9 (Note: Two appearances in UEFA Champions League, seven appearances and one goal in UEFA Europa League)	1	—		41	5
Copenhagen	2020–21	Danish Superliga	27	2	1	0	3 (Note: Appearances in UEFA Europa League)	1	—		31	3
Copenhagen	2021–22	Danish Superliga	32	11	1	0	13 (Note: Appearances in UEFA Europa Conference League)	7	—		46	18
Copenhagen	2022–23	Danish Superliga	7	6	0	0	2 (Note: Appearance in UEFA Champions League)	0	—		9	6
Copenhagen	Total		95	23	5	0	27	9	—		127	32
Olympiacos	2022–23	Super League Greece	30	9	4	1	5	0	—		39	10
Olympiacos	2023–24	Super League Greece	13	1	0	0	7	1	—		20	2
Olympiacos	Total		43	10	4	1	12	1	—		59	12
FC Augsburg (loan)	2023–24	Bundesliga	11	0	—		—		—		11	0
Charlotte FC (loan)	2024	Major League Soccer	9	2	—		—		2 (Note: Appearances in MLS Cup Playoffs)	0	11	2
Charlotte FC (loan)	2025	Major League Soccer	26	10	1	0	—		2 (Note: Appearances in Leagues Cup)	0	29	10
Charlotte FC (loan)	Total		35	12	1	0	—		4	0	40	12
Career total			207	50	11	1	39	10	4	0	261	62

== Honours ==
Copenhagen

- Danish Superliga: 2021–22

Individual

- UEFA Europa Conference League top assist provider: 2021–22
- Copenhagen Player of the Year: 2021–22
- Danish Superliga Player of the Month: August 2021
- Danish Superliga Player of the Year: 2021–22
- Danish Superliga Team of the Year: 2021–22
- Super League Greece Player of the Month: September 2022
- MLS All-Star: 2026
