= Iuri Tavares =

Cape Verdean footballer (born 2001)

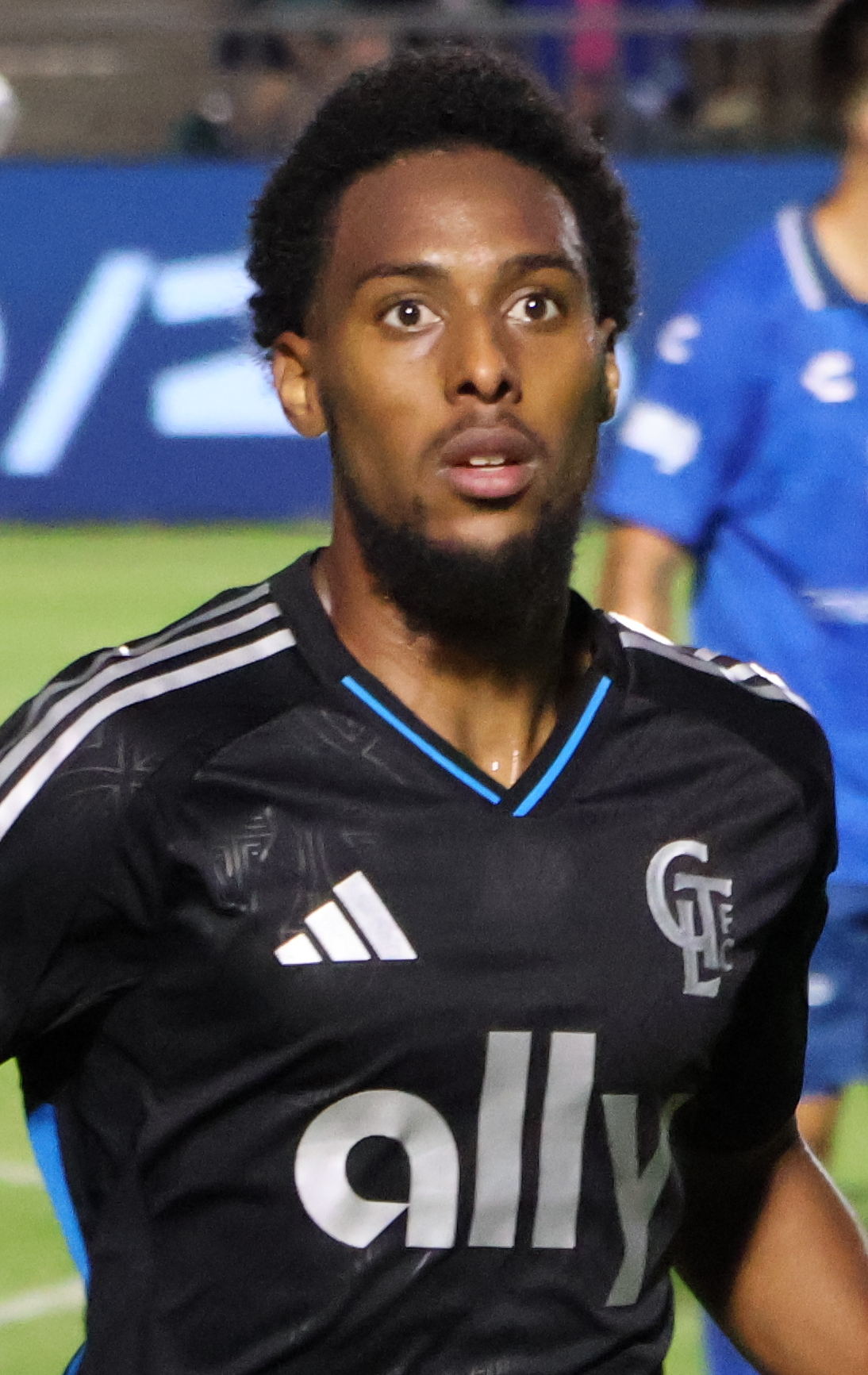
- Tavares with Charlotte in 2025

Personal information
- Full name: Iuri António Teixeira Tavares
- Date of birth: 8 March 2001 (age 25)
- Place of birth: Lisbon, Portugal
- Height: 6 ft 3 in (1.91 m)
- Position: Forward

Team information
- Current team: Varaždin
- Number: 38

Youth career
- Benfica
- → Belenenses (loan)
- Vitória Guimarães

Senior career*
| Years | Team | Apps | (Gls) |
| 2021–2022 | Vitória Guimarães B | 11 | (1) |
| 2021–2022 | Vitória Guimarães | 0 | (0) |
| 2022–2023 | Estoril | 0 | (0) |
| 2023 | Crown Legacy | 26 | (12) |
| 2024–2025 | Charlotte FC | 33 | (3) |
| 2025– | Varaždin | 31 | (6) |

International career
| 2019 | Cape Verde U19 | 2 | (0) |
| 2022 | Cape Verde | 1 | (0) |
- * Club domestic league appearances and goals as of 15 June 2026

Iuri António Teixeira Tavares (born 8 March 2001) is a professional footballer who plays as a forward for HNL club Varaždin. Born in Portugal, he plays for the Cape Verde national team.

== Club career ==
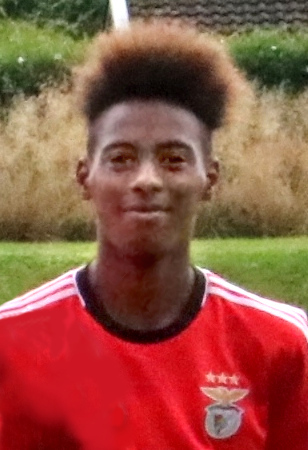
Tavares as a youth player in 2016

Tavares made his professional debut for Vitória Guimarães on 21 November 2021 in a 3–2 Taça de Portugal defeat against Moreirense. He joined Estoril in August 2022.

On 31 January 2023, Tavares signed with MLS Next Pro side Crown Legacy FC, the second team for Major League Soccer's Charlotte FC. On 20 February 2024, Tavares signed with Charlotte FC's first team for the 2024 season.

== International career ==
In March 2022, Tavares received his first call-up to Cape Verde national team for friendly matches against Guadeloupe, Liechtenstein and San Marino.

== Career statistics ==
=== International ===
As of match played 28 March 2022

Appearances and goals by national team and year
| National team | Year | Apps | Goals |
|---|---|---|---|
| Cape Verde | 2022 | 1 | 0 |
| Total | | 1 | 0 |
