= João Pedro Reginaldo =

Brazilian footballer (born 2003)

João Pedro
Personal information
- Full name: João Pedro Reginaldo
- Date of birth: 14 March 2003 (age 23)
- Place of birth: Indaiatuba, São Paulo, Brazil
- Height: 1.84 m (6 ft 1/2 in)
- Position: Left-back

Team information
- Current team: Gwangju FC
- Number: 17

Youth career
- 2017–2019: Juventude
- 2019–2023: Athletico Paranaense

Senior career*
Years	Team	Apps	(Gls)
2023–2024	Athletico Paranaense	0	(0)
2023	→ Crown Legacy FC	27	(2)
2024–2025	Charlotte FC	7	(0)
2024	→ Crown Legacy FC (loan)	7	(0)
2025	→ Rio Ave (loan)	5	(0)
2025–2026	Radomiak Radom	16	(0)
2026–	Gwangju FC	5	(0)

International career
2021	Brazil U20	1	(0)
- * Club domestic league appearances and goals as of 4 August 2026

João Pedro Reginaldo (born 14 March 2003) is a Brazilian professional footballer who plays as a left-back or centre-back for K League 1 club Gwangju FC.

== Early life ==
From Indaiatuba, in the state of São Paulo, he started playing football at the age of five years-old, at Mundo Bola school. He had spells at União Barbarense, Ponte Preta, Guarani and Red Bull Brasil before joining Juventude in 2017.

== Club career ==
He spent two years at the Juventude academy, before moving to Athletico Paranaense in 2019 aged 16 years-old, initially on a two-year contract.

He played for MLS Next Pro side Crown Legacy FC on loan in 2023, where he was named in the MLS NEXT Pro Best XI in 2023. He joined Charlotte FC ahead of the 2024 season, agreeing to a three-year contract with the option of a fourth.

On 1 February 2025, he went on loan to Primeira Liga club Rio Ave in Portugal.

On 5 July 2025, he joined Polish Ekstraklasa club Radomiak Radom on a three-year contract. On 24 June 2026, his contract was terminated by mutual consent.

On 1 July 2026, he signed for K League 1 club Gwangju FC.

== International career ==
He played for Brazil U20 in a 4–0 win over United States men's national under-20 soccer team in November 2021.

== Style of play ==
He is capable of playing centrally and as an attacking left back, and took set pieces for Crown Legacy.
