= Nikola Petković (footballer, born 2003) =

Serbian footballer (born 2003)

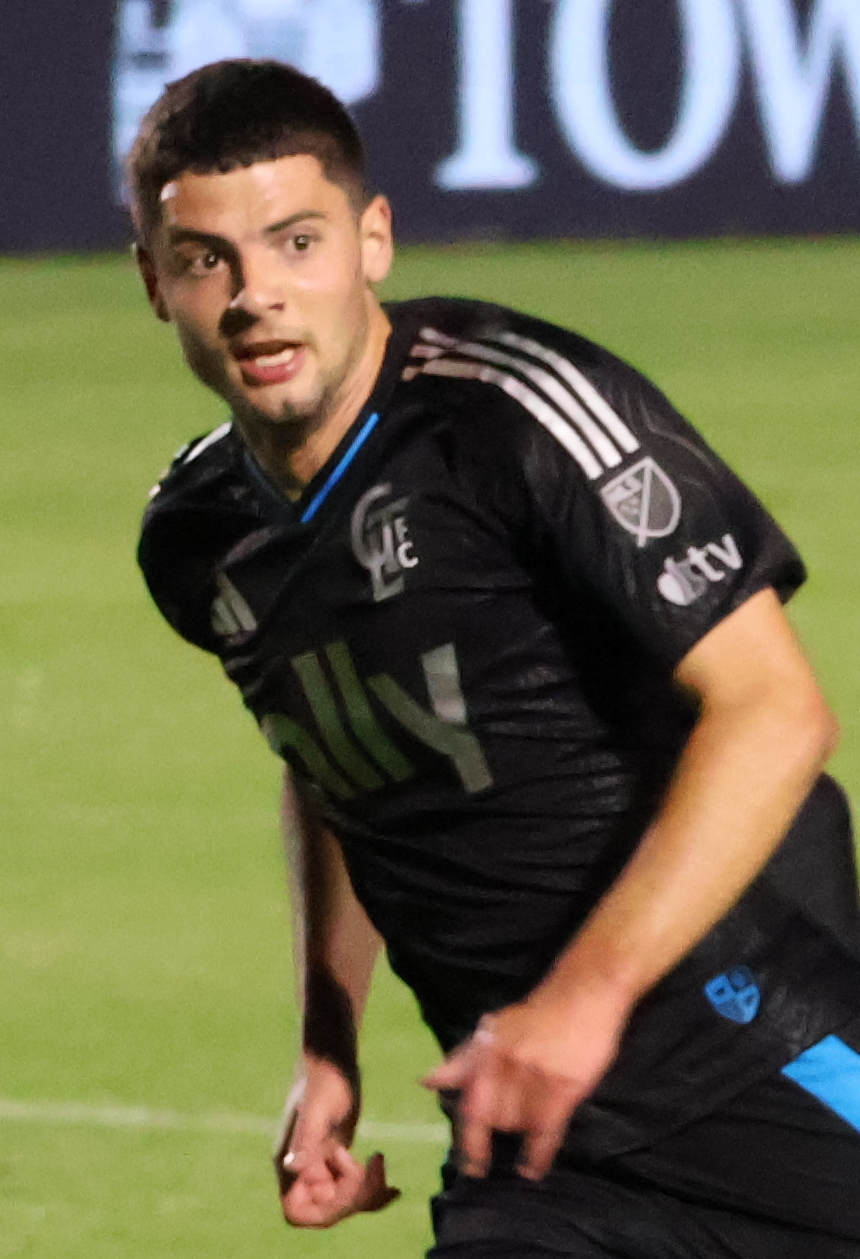
- Petković with Charlotte FC in 2025

Personal information
- Full name: Nikola Petković
- Date of birth: 23 February 2003 (age 23)
- Place of birth: Zrenjanin, Serbia and Montenegro
- Height: 1.81 m (5 ft 11 in)
- Position: Defensive midfielder

Team information
- Current team: Seattle Sounders (on loan from Charlotte FC)
- Number: 44

Senior career*
Years	Team	Apps	(Gls)
2021–2023	Čukarički	17	(0)
2023–2025	Crown Legacy FC	18	(3)
2024–	Charlotte FC	18	(1)
2026–	→ Seattle Sounders (loan)	4	(0)
2026	→ Tacoma Defiance (loan)	1	(0)

International career^{‡}
2022–	Serbia U21	7	(0)
2023–	Serbia	1	(0)
- * Club domestic league appearances and goals as of 20:49, 15 November 2026 (UTC) ‡ National team caps and goals as of 00:20, 24 November 2023 (UTC)

Nikola Petković (Serbian Cyrillic: Никола Петковић; born 23 February 2003) is a Serbian footballer who plays as a defensive midfielder for Major League Soccer side Seattle Sounders FC, on loan from Charlotte FC.

== Career ==
At the age of 4, Petkovic began playing football before joining the Bambi Academy at the age of 7.

Petković began his career with Čukarički.

On 16 February 2023, he joined Crown Legacy FC, the reserve team for Major League Soccer side Charlotte FC, who compete in the MLS Next Pro.

Petković made multiple appearances for the first team during the 2025 season. On 8 January 2026, he was loaned to Seattle Sounders FC for one a one-year term in exchange for a 2027 MLS SuperDraft pick.

== International career ==
He has captained the Serbia national under-19 football team. Petković made his debut for Serbia national football team on 25 January 2023 in a friendly match against USA. Serbia won the game 2–1, with Petković being a starter.

== Career statistics ==
=== International ===
As of 25 January 2023

Serbia
Year	Apps	Goals
2023	1	0
Total	1	0
