= Charlotte FC =

Major League Soccer team in Charlotte, North Carolina, U.S.

- Full name: Charlotte Football Club
- Nickname: The Crown
- Short name: CLTFC
- Founded: December 17, 2019; 6 years ago
- Stadium: Bank of America Stadium; Charlotte, North Carolina
- Capacity: 38,000 (expandable to 74,867)
- Owner: David Tepper
- General manager: Zoran Krneta
- Head coach: Dean Smith
- League: Major League Soccer
- 2026: Eastern Conference: 5th Overall: 7th Playoffs: TBD
- Website: charlottefootballclub.com
Home colors	Away colors	Third colors

Charlotte Football Club is an American professional soccer club based in Charlotte, North Carolina. The club competes in Major League Soccer (MLS) as a member of the Eastern Conference. The team is owned by David Tepper, who was awarded the expansion franchise on December 17, 2019. It began play in the 2022 MLS season as the league's 28th franchise. Charlotte FC plays at Bank of America Stadium, which it shares with the Carolina Panthers of the National Football League, a team also owned by Tepper; the stadium capacity is reduced to 38,000 for most matches.

== History ==
=== Soccer in Charlotte ===
The Charlotte area has been home to several lower-division soccer teams, dating back to the Carolina Lightnin' in the early 1980s. The Lightnin' won the American Soccer League championship in 1981 in front of 20,163 people at American Legion Memorial Stadium. It marked Charlotte's first professional sports championship. After the league folded in 1983, the team played for one season as the Charlotte Gold in United Soccer League before ceasing operations. Professional soccer did not return to Charlotte until the founding of the Charlotte Eagles in 1991, who joined the USISL in 1993.

Charlotte was on the list of cities interested in joining Major League Soccer (MLS) in 1994, prior to the league's inaugural season, but was not awarded a franchise. Charlotte was also named as a potential home for an expansion team in both 1996 and 1998, but was passed over in favor of other cities. The Charlotte Convention Center hosted the MLS SuperDraft and National Soccer Coaches Association of America conference in January 2004. Since a renovation to Bank of America Stadium in 2014, the city has hosted several friendly and international matches, including the CONCACAF Gold Cup and the International Champions Cup, which drew strong attendance figures. The area also has a large soccer-playing population, centered around recreational leagues that have led other efforts to attract a professional team to Charlotte.

=== Unsuccessful MLS bids ===
A separate professional team, the Charlotte Independence, was founded in 2014 and replaced the Eagles in the second division (now named the USL Championship). The team moved into a permanent soccer stadium in Matthews, North Carolina, in 2017. The Independence's ownership group had expressed their goal of winning an MLS expansion team when the club was founded, and proposed a major renovation to American Legion Memorial Stadium in 2015 that would make it into soccer-specific stadium. The team hired a sports investment firm in October 2016 to advertise the MLS bid to potential investors while preparing further stadium plans.

A separate Charlotte bid was formed in late 2016 by Marcus G. Smith of Speedway Motorsports, the owners of the Charlotte Motor Speedway, with support from local business leaders. The bid proposed building a new stadium at the Memorial Stadium site with 20,000 to 30,000 seats that would cost $175 million, including $87.5 million funded by the city and county governments and a $75 million loan to the ownership group. The Mecklenburg County Board of Commissioners voted 5–3 in favor of the stadium plan, while the Charlotte City Council decided against a vote on the issue before the bid deadline on January 31, 2017.

Smith submitted the bid without the city council's support, instead relying on the county government's funding plan. Several league officials toured Charlotte in July 2017, but the city council and county commissioners both canceled their meetings during the tour. Charlotte also faced competition from a bid submitted by Raleigh, North Carolina, who were also part of the twelve-city shortlist and had support from the state government. The Mecklenburg County government voted in August against their financial contribution to the stadium project in favor of deferring the issue to the city government, who declined to vote on the issue. MLS narrowed its shortlist of candidates in November 2017 to four cities, leaving out Charlotte.

=== Expansion bid under Tepper ===
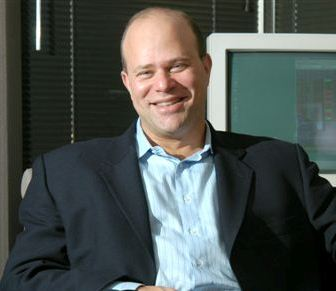
Carolina Panthers owner David Tepper (pictured in 2006) submitted the expansion bid for Charlotte FC in 2019

David Tepper, who had purchased a 5% stake in the Pittsburgh Steelers in 2009, became the owner of the National Football League's Carolina Panthers in July 2018 and suggested his interest in bringing Major League Soccer to Charlotte. The Panthers' new team president, Tom Glick, was formerly the chief operating officer of Manchester City F.C. and was also involved in the MLS expansion bid for New York City FC. Glick was placed in charge of organizing an MLS expansion bid for Tepper, who had several meetings with league officials before the next bidding window was opened in April 2019.

Tepper presented a formal expansion bid for Charlotte to the league in July 2019, shortly before meetings with league officials and additional tours of Bank of America Stadium. He announced plans in September to upgrade the existing Bank of America Stadium to make it suitable for an MLS team, which would include up to $210 million in contributions from the city government. Tepper also discussed constructing a new stadium for the Panthers and a soccer team that would have a retractable roof. In November, MLS commissioner Don Garber named Charlotte as the frontrunner to earn the slot for the 30th team, praising Tepper's efforts and the bid's plans.

The Charlotte City Council approved $110 million in stadium and franchise funding in late November, using revenue from a hospitality tax. MLS's board of governors convened in early December to discuss the Charlotte bid and authorized final negotiations with Tepper. The expansion team was officially awarded to Charlotte by MLS at an event at the Mint Museum on December 17, 2019, with the team to begin play in 2021. The expansion fee to be paid by Tepper is reported to be near $325 million, a 62.5 percent increase from what was paid by the successful bids for St. Louis and Sacramento earlier in the year. The team sold 7,000 season ticket deposits in the first 24 hours after the expansion announcement. On July 17, 2020, MLS announced that the Charlotte expansion team's debut would be delayed by a year to 2022 due to the COVID-19 pandemic.

=== Inaugural season ===
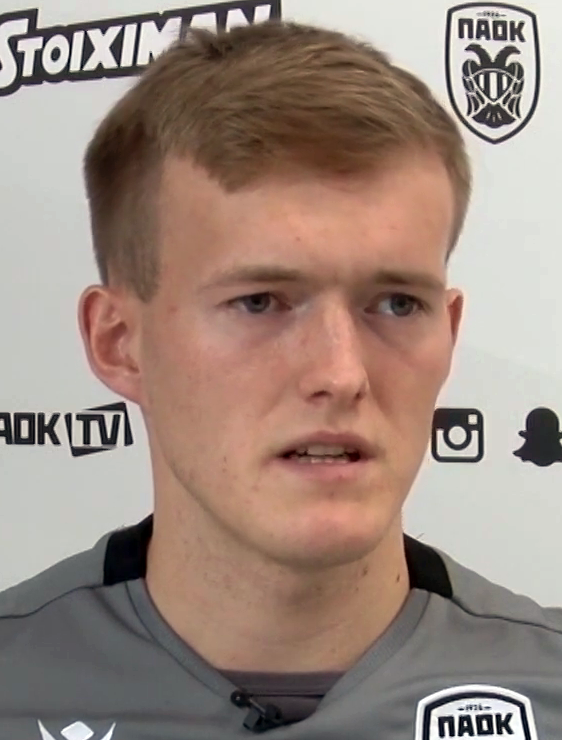
Polish forward Karol Świderski was signed as Charlotte FC's first Designated Player prior to the 2022 season

The club signed its first player, Spanish midfielder Sergio Ruiz, from Racing Santander on July 8, 2020; he was immediately loaned out to UD Las Palmas for 18 months, with an expected arrival in Charlotte in January 2022. Spanish manager Miguel Ángel Ramírez was hired as the team's first head coach in July 2021. During the 2021 MLS Expansion Draft, Charlotte FC selected five players and traded away two for general allocation money; the three picks they kept were used on veteran defenders Anton Walkes and Joseph Mora along with winger McKinze Gaines. The club signed its first Designated Player, Polish forward Karol Świderski, on January 26, 2022. Joe LaBue, a Carolina Panthers sales executive, was appointed club president in February 2022 to replace Glick after his departure. According to a FIFA report, Charlotte FC spent the most in transfer fees of any club in the CONCACAF region in 2022.

Charlotte FC played their first MLS regular season match on February 26, 2022, losing 3–0 to D.C. United at Audi Field. The club's home debut at Bank of America Stadium, a 1–0 loss to the LA Galaxy on March 5, was played before a crowd of 74,479–at the time, the largest single-match crowd in MLS history. For a time, it was the second-largest crowd to attend a match anywhere in the world in 2022. Adam Armour scored the club's first goal on March 13 in a 2–1 loss to Atlanta United FC; Charlotte's first win, a 3–1 result at home, was a week later against the defending Supporters Shield holders New England Revolution.

Ramírez was fired on May 31 after 14 league matches due to conflicts with the front office according to media reports; at the time, Charlotte was tied for eighth in the Eastern Conference, one place below a playoff berth. The club had also been eliminated from the 2022 U.S. Open Cup in the round of 16 a few days earlier. Assistant coach Christian Lattanzio was named interim head coach and led the club to defeat the New York Red Bulls in his first match. Charlotte FC earned their first away win, a 2–1 victory over Houston Dynamo FC, on July 3 after seven losses and two draws.

Charlotte FC played their first international friendly on July 20, 2022, against England's Chelsea; the match was tied 1–1 after regulation time and decided by a penalty shootout, which Charlotte FC won 5–3. The team's first hat-trick was earned by Daniel Ríos, who scored four goals against the Philadelphia Union on October 1. The club remained in contention for a playoff spot until the penultimate matchday of the season, but were eliminated after a 2–2 draw with the Columbus Crew. Charlotte FC finished their inaugural season at ninth place in the Eastern Conference with 13 wins, 18 losses, and 3 draws; the team drew an average attendance of 35,260 per match, the second-highest figure in MLS behind Atlanta United FC. During the offseason, Lattanzio was signed as permanent head coach through 2024, having amassed an 8–10–2 record; he added retired captain Christian Fuchs to his staff as an assistant coach.

== Club identity ==
In December 2019, several media outlets reported that Tepper Sports had submitted a trademark filing that included eight potential names: Charlotte FC, Charlotte Crown FC, Charlotte Fortune FC, Charlotte Monarchs FC, Charlotte Athletic FC, Charlotte Town FC, Carolina Gliders FC, and All Carolina FC. A name announcement was scheduled for June 2020, but was delayed a month due to the COVID-19 pandemic. The name and crest were revealed during a livestream event on July 22, 2020, with Charlotte Football Club (shortened to Charlotte FC) chosen as the winner.

The club's crest was designed by Doubleday & Cartwright and consists of a black roundel with a Process Blue center, the same shade of blue used by the Carolina Panthers. The shape, resembling a coin, and use of "Minted 2022" in the crest are references to the city's banking industry and the historic Charlotte Mint, the first U.S. Mint branch. At the center is a four-pointed crown, referencing the four wards of Uptown Charlotte and the city's nickname of the "Queen City", itself referencing namesake Charlotte of Mecklenburg-Strelitz. The team is sometimes referred to as "The Crown" due to its crest; this nickname was incorporated into the name of the club's affiliated reserve team, Crown Legacy FC.

The bid organizers signed a multi-year kit sponsorship agreement with Ally Financial in July 2019 for the then-unannounced MLS team. A sleeve sponsorship from Centene Corporation, a health insurance company, was announced in October 2021 with undisclosed financial terms. The deal includes a donation to pay for 1,900 personal seat licenses at Bank of America Stadium to reduce the cost of season tickets for some fans; the donation also funds community programs in the Charlotte area and the construction of mini-pitches in the Carolinas.

Charlotte FC's first primary jersey, named the "Carolina Kit", was unveiled in December 2021. It is primarily blue with white sleeves and a darker blue stripe around the neck and sleeve cuffs; the jersey also features the outlines of North Carolina and South Carolina in the lower-left corner. The club's secondary "Newly Minted" community kit—a black jersey with mint-colored highlights—was released in February 2022 and used for one season. Its design includes a patterned coin edge that references the Charlotte Mint. A new secondary jersey, named the "Crown Jewel", was unveiled ahead of the 2023 season; it is primarily purple with blue highlights and pink stripes in an homage to Queen Charlotte according to team president Joe LaBue.

== Stadium ==
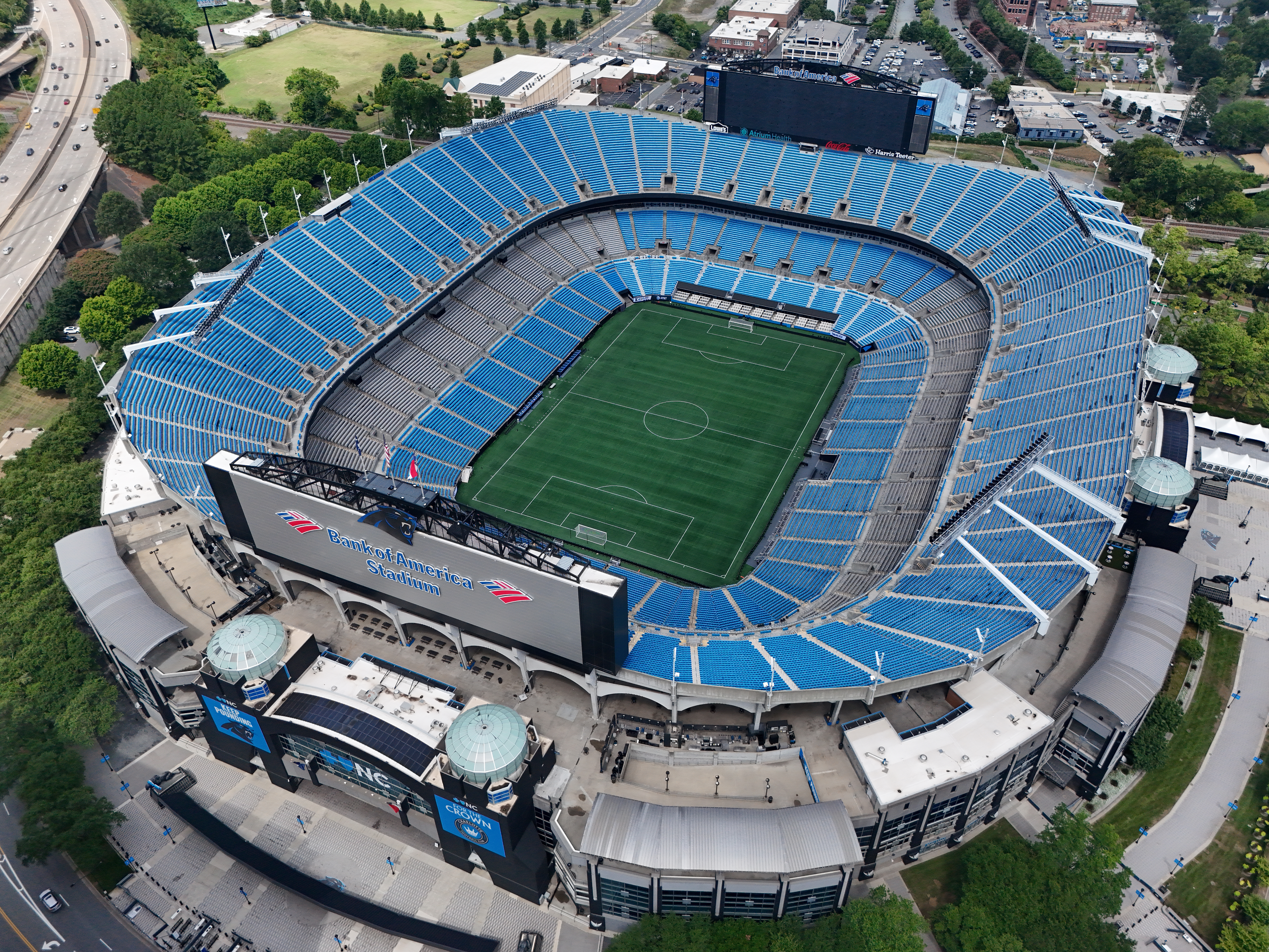
Bank of America Stadium, the club's home

Charlotte FC plays at Bank of America Stadium, a 74,867-seat stadium that is also home to the Carolina Panthers of the National Football League; the Panthers are also owned by Tepper. For most matches, the club only uses the lower bowl and club sections of the stadium, capping capacity at 38,000 seats. For major matches, such as the 2022 home opener, the club expands the stadium to full capacity by opening the upper bowl.

A renovation to accommodate the club began in March 2021 and was completed in early 2022, adding dedicated locker rooms and training rooms for soccer, a player tunnel at midfield, and a larger concourse area. It cost $50 million to construct, with funding from Tepper Sports and the city government. A dedicated section for supporters' groups is located behind the goal on the east side of the stadium. The stadium's grass surface was replaced with FieldTurf in 2021 due to the additional wear expected from hosting MLS matches.

In February 2021, Charlotte FC announced that it would be the first MLS team to use personal seat licenses to reserve season tickets in most sections; the cost of seat licenses for the inaugural season was set at $550 per seat and would not be transferable to a potential new stadium. The announcement, along with high season ticket prices for the inaugural season, was met with backlash from fans. The personal seat license system was discontinued in 2026 amid a decline in attendance and season ticket revenue; existing holders were refunded with credits for future season tickets.

=== Headquarters and training facility ===
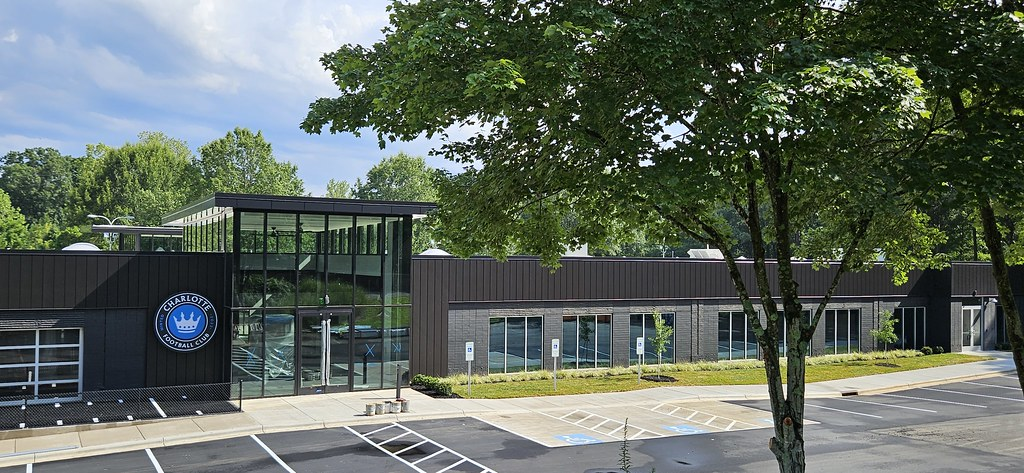
The Atrium Health Performance Park, which houses the headquarters and training facilities for Charlotte FC and Crown Legacy FC

The team's headquarters and practice facilities were initially planned to be located on the former site of the Eastland Mall, a city-owned property. In October 2020, the planned Eastland Mall facility was cancelled due to a reduction in financial incentives offered by the city government, including a tax reimbursement. The Eastland site was instead proposed as the home of the Charlotte FC Elite Academy, which would occupy 22 acres (8.9 ha) for youth soccer and other public sportsfields. Charlotte FC's headquarters were replaced with a building in the Uptown neighborhood, while the team would train at Sportsplex at Matthews until a permanent facility is built.

A new plan to renovate a southeastern Charlotte office building into the club's headquarters and training facility was announced in 2022. The campus, named the Atrium Health Performance Park, opened in August 2023 and is used by Charlotte FC, reserve team Crown Legacy FC, and academy teams. It includes 52,000 square feet (4,800 m^{2}) of space, a 45-seat auditorium, and eight fields split between grass and turf. The facility was used by Real Madrid and Inter Milan during the 2025 FIFA Club World Cup and was selected by the Scotland national team as their base camp during the 2026 FIFA World Cup.

== Broadcasting ==
Since 2023, Apple TV has had worldwide broadcast rights for all MLS matches in both English and Spanish. Their MLS Season Pass platform includes all league and playoff matches for Charlotte FC.

Charlotte FC had a local television partnership with the Cox Media Group that was announced in April 2021. Most English broadcasts in the Charlotte market aired on WAXN-TV, with the remainder on WSOC-TV; stations in eleven other markets in the Carolinas also carried broadcasts. The Spanish broadcast was exclusive to Telemundo Charlotte. Raycom Sports handled local production and syndication for the Charlotte FC television network. The English television broadcasting team comprised play-by-play announcer Eric Krakauer, formerly of BeIN Sports; and color commentator Lloyd Sam, a former MLS player. The Spanish team consisted of play-by-play announcer Jamie Moreno and color analyst Antonio Ramos. Matches broadcast locally were also streamed on the club's website for viewers in most of the Carolinas. In 2025, Charlotte FC matches returned to WAXN and WSOC-TV on a 48-hour tape delay in the late night hours.

In January 2022, Charlotte FC announced a radio partnership with Radio One, who would carry matches on various local stations. Most English-language radio broadcasts air on WFNZ-FM, with the remainder (mostly those conflicting with Charlotte Hornets games) on sister station WBT-FM. WFNZ-FM and WBT-FM front a network of seven stations in North Carolina, South Carolina and Virginia. The English radio commentators on these stations are play-by-play announcer Will Palaszczuk and color analyst Anna Witte. Jessica Charman was the analyst for the first three seasons. Radio broadcasts in Spanish are carried on WOLS and syndicated by Norsan Media to eleven stations in the Carolinas.

== Ownership and management ==
Charlotte FC is owned by David Tepper, a billionaire hedge fund manager and businessman who bought the National Football League's Carolina Panthers in 2018. Tepper, was at the time; the wealthiest owner in the NFL, with an estimated net worth of $12 billion. Zoran Krneta, a professional scout, was hired as the club's sporting director in December 2019. Former Carolina Dynamo head coach Marc Nicholls was named the club's technical director in January 2020 and was head of the youth academy system until his departure two years later, prior to the inaugural season.

Miguel Ángel Ramírez, formerly manager of Brazil's Sport Club Internacional, was hired as the team's first head coach in July 2021. On May 31, 2022, the club announced that Ramírez had been fired. Assistant coach Christian Lattanzio was named interim head coach for the remainder of the season. He was hired as permanent head coach at the end of the season and signed a two-year contract. On November 8, 2023, the club announced that head coach Christian Lattanzio and assistant coach Andy Quy would leave Charlotte FC.

Dean Smith, former manager of Aston Villa F.C., was announced as the team's third head coach on December 12, 2023.

=== Reserves and academy ===
From 2021 to 2022, Charlotte FC had an affiliation agreement with USL Championship (and later USL League One) side Charlotte Independence, who would serve as a reserve squad and take at least three loaned players to develop and train. The affiliation was terminated at the end of the 2022 season and the Independence were replaced by Crown Legacy FC, a new reserve team in MLS Next Pro that would be operated directly by Charlotte FC. The team, based at the Sportsplex at Matthews, began play in 2023.

The club's youth academy was established in July 2020 with squads at the under-17, under-14, under-13, and under-12 levels; the initial signings for the full-time under-17 and under-14 squads were sourced from outside the Carolinas, while other squads were filled by players who transferred from existing Charlotte-area teams and programs. The under-17 and under-15 squads were the first Charlotte FC teams to play at Bank of America Stadium, where they faced squads from the Atlanta United FC Academy with 1,800 spectators in attendance. The senior team signed their first homegrown players, Brian Romero and Nimfasha Berchimas, in 2022.

== Club culture ==
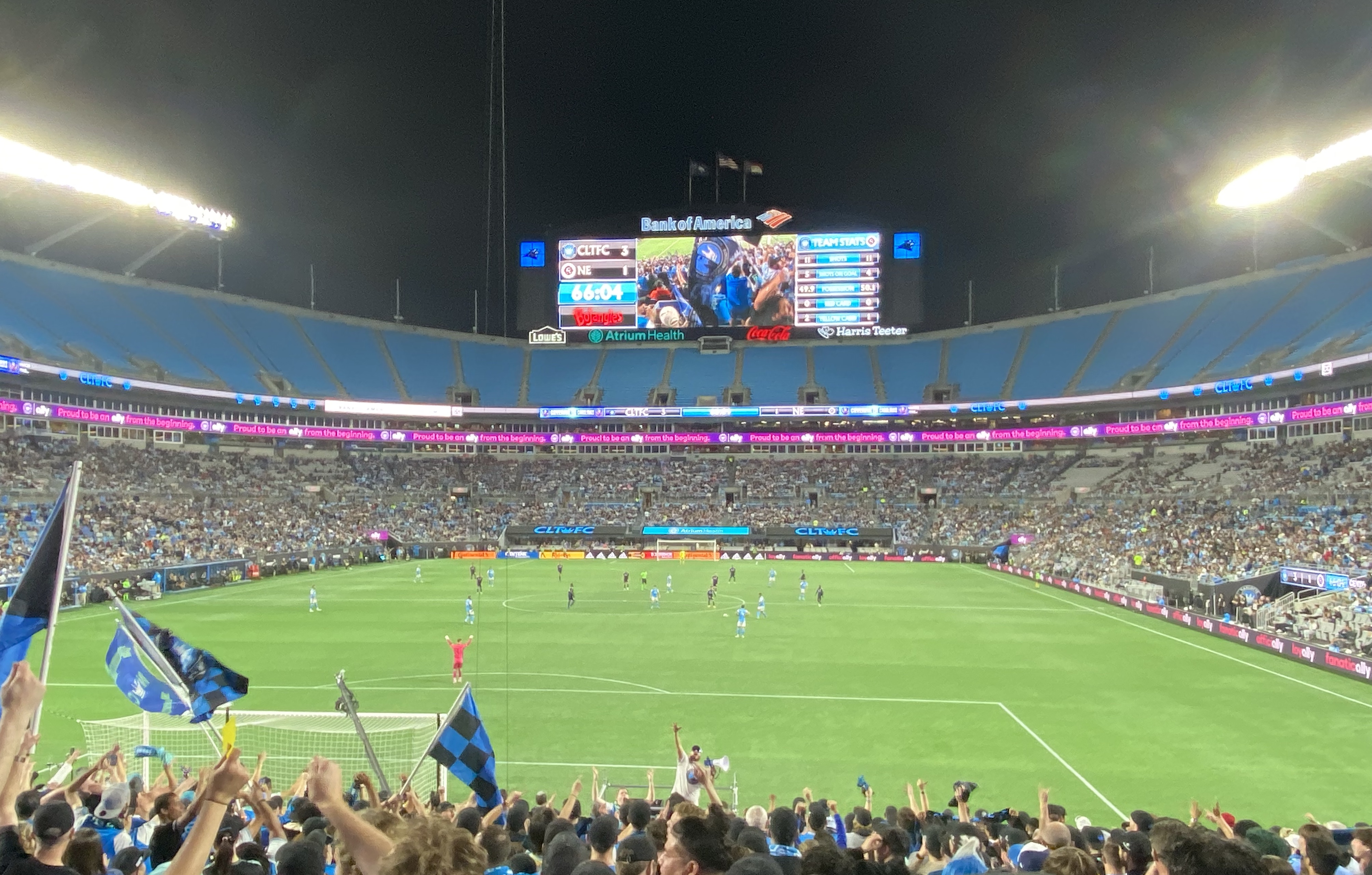
View from supporters' section at Bank of America Stadium in March 2022

Charlotte FC has four officially recognized supporters groups collectively known as "the Royal Family". They are seated in the east end at Bank of America Stadium. The five recognized groups from the inaugural season were Mint City Collective, Southbound and Crown, the Uptown Ultras, Carolina Hooliganz, and Blue Furia, a Latin American supporters' group with a band. Other supporters clubs include the Queen's Firm, founded in 2017, and the QC Royals, founded in 2015 to support other minor league teams.

Starting with the inaugural season, a local celebrity is "crowned" as the "monarch" of the match; the first home match featured the crowning of former Panthers player Steve Smith Sr. After every home win, the man of the match is crowned by the supporters section. Prior to kick off, fans in the supporters' section lock arms and perform "the Poznań" (a Polish supporters' dance) to the Farruko song "Pepas". The club's official mascot is Sir Minty, an anthropomorphic soccer ball that wears a crown, cape, and an oversized silver chain with an "M" medallion.

== Players ==
=== Roster ===
As of October 10, 2026

Note: Flags indicate national team as defined under FIFA eligibility rules; some limited exceptions apply. Players may hold more than one non-FIFA nationality.

No.	Pos.	Nation	Player
1	GK	CRO	Kristijan Kahlina
3	DF	USA	Tim Ream
4	DF	USA	Andrew Privett
6	MF	MLI	Abdoulaye Doucouré
7	FW	AUS	Archie Goodwin
8	MF	ENG	Ashley Westwood (captain)
9	FW	ISR	Idan Toklomati
10	FW	FRA	Allan Saint-Maximin (DP)
11	FW	ISR	Liel Abada (DP)
13	MF	USA	Brandt Bronico
14	DF	ENG	Nathan Byrne
15	DF	ENG	Harry Toffolo
16	MF	ESP	Pep Biel
17	MF	USA	Luca de la Torre
20	MF	MLI	Baye Coulibaly

No.	Pos.	Nation	Player
21	GK	USA	Tyler Miller
22	DF	USA	Henry Kessler
23	DF	AUT	David Schnegg
25	FW	ENG	Tyger Smalls
27	FW	USA	Nimfasha Berchimas (HG)
28	MF	FRA	Djibril Diani
34	DF	VIN	Andrew Johnson
35	DF	USA	Will Cleary
37	FW	BEN	Rodolfo Aloko
41	FW	USA	Brian Romero (HG)
42	GK	USA	Isaac Walker
44	DF	GHA	Morrison Agyemang
48	MF	USA	Aron John (HG)
71	MF	USA	Nathan Richmond
83	FW	CAN	Hugo Mbongue

=== Out on loan ===
Note: Flags indicate national team as defined under FIFA eligibility rules; some limited exceptions apply. Players may hold more than one non-FIFA nationality.

No.	Pos.	Nation	Player
19	MF	SRB	Nikola Petković (on loan to Seattle Sounders FC)
24	DF	USA	Mikah Thomas (on loan to Indy Eleven)

No.	Pos.	Nation	Player
26	GK	USA	Chituru Odunze (on loan to Phoenix Rising FC)
39	DF	USA	Jack Neeley (HG; on loan to Charlotte Independence)

== Staff ==
=== Current technical staff ===
Executive
Owner	David Tepper
General manager	Zoran Krneta
Chief executive officer	Kristi Coleman
Technical director	Tommy Wilson
Academy manager	Bryan Scales
Coaching staff
Head coach	Dean Smith
Associate head coach	Miles Joseph
Assistant coach	Gary Dicker
Goalkeeping coach	Aron Hyde
Head tactical analyst	Rohan Sachdev

Last updated: November 9, 2025
Source: Charlotte FC

== Team records ==
Results of Charlotte FC league and cup competitions by season
Season	League									Position		Playoffs result	USOC	Continental / Other		Average attendance	Top goalscorer(s)	
Season	Pld	W	L	D	GF	GA	GD	Pts	PPG	Conf.	Overall	Playoffs result	USOC	Continental / Other		Average attendance	Player(s)	Goals
2022	34	13	18	3	44	52	–8	42	1.24	9th	19th	Did not qualify	Ro16	Did not qualify		35,260	(Poland) Karol Swiderski	10
2023	34	10	11	13	45	52	–7	43	1.26	9th	19th	Wild Card	Ro16	Leagues Cup	QF	36,337	(Poland) Karol Swiderski	12
2024	34	14	11	9	46	37	9	51	1.5	5th	11th	R1	Did not compete	Leagues Cup	GS	33,383	(United States) Patrick Agyemang	10
2025	34	19	13	2	55	46	9	59	1.74	4th	7th	R1	Ro16	Leagues Cup	GS	30,664	(Israel) Idan Toklomati	11

a. Avg. attendance include statistics from league matches only.
b. Top goalscorer(s) includes all goals scored in league, MLS Cup Playoffs, U.S. Open Cup, Leagues Cup, CONCACAF Champions League, FIFA Club World Cup, and other competitive continental matches.

=== Head coaches ===
As of November 2025

- Includes regular season, playoff, CONCACAF Champions Cup, Leagues Cup, and U.S. Open Cup games.

All-time Charlotte FC coaching statistics
Coach	Nationality	Tenure	Games	Win	Loss	Draw	Win %
Miguel Ángel Ramírez	Spain	July 7, 2021 – May 31, 2022	14	5	8	1	35.71
Christian Lattanzio	Italy	May 31, 2022 – November 8, 2023	66	26	25	15	39.39
Dean Smith	England	December 12, 2023 – present	81	35	29	17	43.21

=== Captains ===
Name	Nationality	Years
Christian Fuchs	Austria	2022
Ashley Westwood	England	2023–present
