= 2024 FC Cincinnati season =

FC Cincinnati
2024 season
- General manager: Chris Albright
- Head coach: Pat Noonan
- Stadium: TQL Stadium
- MLS: Conference: 3rd Overall: 5th
- MLS Cup Playoffs: Round one
- Leagues Cup: Round of 16
- CONCACAF Champions Cup: Round of 16
- Top goalscorer: League: Acosta (10); All: Acosta (11)
- Highest home attendance: League/All: 25,513 (3 times)
- Lowest home attendance: League: 24,282; All: 15,307
- Average home league attendance: 25,103
- Biggest win: CIN 6–1 MIA (7/06)
- Biggest defeat: CIN 0-2 NSH (5/29)
Home colors	Away colors

The 2024 FC Cincinnati season was the club's sixth season in MLS, and the ninth season overall for the team including their first three years in the lower-division USL. The club entered 2024 as the defending Supporters' Shield winners, the award given to the team that finishes with the most points in the regular season.

FC Cincinnati home matches were played at TQL Stadium. 2024 was the third season with the club for general manager Chris Albright and head coach Pat Noonan.

== Club ==
=== Roster ===
As of September 23, 2024

No.	Name	Nationality	Position	Date of birth (age)	Previous club
1	Alec Kann	United States	GK	August 8, 1990 (age 36)	(United States) Atlanta United FC
18	Roman Celentano (GA)	United States	GK	September 14, 2000 (age 26)	(United States) Indiana Hoosiers
36	Evan Louro	United States	GK	January 19, 1996 (age 30)	(United States) Tampa Bay Rowdies
2	Alvas Powell	Jamaica	DF	July 18, 1994 (age 32)	(United States) Philadelphia Union
4	Nick Hagglund	United States	DF	September 14, 1992 (age 34)	(Canada) Toronto FC
6	Chidozie Awaziem	Nigeria	DF	January 1, 1997 (age 29)	(Portugal) Boavista F.C.
12	Miles Robinson	United States	DF	March 14, 1997 (age 29)	(United States) Atlanta United
14	Kipp Keller (GA)	United States	DF	July 14, 2000 (age 26)	(United States) Austin FC
15	Bret Halsey (GA)	United States	DF	June 1, 2000 (age 26)	(United States) Colorado Springs Switchbacks
16	Teenage Hadebe	Zimbabwe	DF	September 17, 1995 (age 31)	(Turkey) Konyaspor
21	Matt Miazga	United States	DF	July 19, 1995 (age 31)	(England) Chelsea F.C.
32	Ian Murphy	United States	DF	January 16, 2000 (age 26)	(United States) Duke Blue Devils
33	Isaiah Foster	United States	DF	August 12, 2003 (age 23)	(United States) Colorado Springs Switchbacks
34	London Aghedo	United States	DF	May 31, 2000 (age 26)	(United States) Air Force Falcons
91	DeAndre Yedlin	United States	DF	July 9, 1993 (age 33)	(United States) Inter Miami CF
5	Obinna Nwobodo (INTL, DP)	Nigeria	MF	November 29, 1996 (age 29)	(Turkey) Göztepe S.K.
10	Luciano Acosta (DP)	Argentina	MF	May 31, 1994 (age 32)	(Mexico) Atlas
20	Pavel Bucha	Czech Republic	MF	March 11, 1998 (age 28)	(Czech Republic) FC Viktoria Plzeň
22	Gerardo Valenzuela (HG)	United States	MF	September 28, 2004 (age 21)	(United States) FC Cincinnati Academy
23	Luca Orellano	Argentina	MF	March 22, 2000 (age 26)	(Brazil) CR Vasco da Gama
26	Malik Pinto	United States	MF	August 9, 2002 (age 24)	(United States) FC Cincinnati Academy
27	Yamil Asad	Argentina	MF	July 27, 1994 (age 32)	(United States) D.C. United
37	Stiven Jimenez (HG)	United States	MF	June 24, 2007 (age 19)	(United States) FC Cincinnati Academy
7	Yuya Kubo (INTL)	Japan	FW	December 23, 1993 (age 32)	(Belgium) K.A.A. Gent
9	Nicholas Gioacchini	United States	FW	July 25, 2000 (age 26)	(Italy) Como 1907
11	Corey Baird (HG)	United States	FW	January 30, 1996 (age 30)	(United States) Houston Dynamo
17	Sérgio Santos	Brazil	FW	September 4, 1994 (age 32)	(United States) Philadelphia Union
19	Kevin Kelsy	Venezuela	FW	July 27, 2004 (age 22)	(Ukraine) FC Shakhtar Donetsk

== Player movement ==
=== In ===
Date	No.	Pos	Player	Transferred from	Fee/notes	Ref
December 13, 2023	14	DF	(United States) Kipp Keller	(United States) Austin FC	Trade for third round SuperDraft selection	
January 3, 2023	12	DF	(United States) Miles Robinson	(United States) Atlanta United	Free agent	
January 11, 2023	11	FW	(United States) Corey Baird	(United States) Houston Dynamo	Free agent	
February 7, 2023	20	MF	(Czech Republic) Pavel Bucha	(Czech Republic) FC Viktoria Plzeň	Acquisition via transfer	
March 4, 2024	91	DF	(United States) DeAndre Yedlin	(United States) Inter Miami CF	$172,799 in GAM	
March 28, 2024	27	MF	(Argentina) Yamil Asad	(United States) D.C. United	Free agent	
July 25, 2024	6	DF	(Nigeria) Chidozie Awaziem	(Portugal) Boavista F.C.	Acquisition via transfer	
August 27, 2024	16	DF	(Zimbabwe) Teenage Hadebe	(Turkey) Konyaspor	Acquisition via transfer	

=== Out ===
Date	No.	Pos	Player	Transferred to	Fee/notes	Ref
December 6, 2023	13	DF	(Colombia) Santiago Arias	(Brazil) Bahia	Option declined	
December 6, 2023	14	FW	(Senegal) Dominique Badji	(Turkey) Bandırmaspor	Option declined	
December 6, 2023	28	DF	(United States) Ray Gaddis	Retired	Option declined	
December 6, 2023	35	MF	(United States) Harrison Robledo		Option declined	
December 6, 2023	93	MF	(Venezuela) Júnior Moreno	(Saudi Arabia) Al-Hazem	Option declined	
January 10, 2024	19	FW	(United States) Brandon Vazquez	(Mexico) Monterrey	Transfer, up to $8.5M	
August 8, 2024	9	FW	(Gabon) Aaron Boupendza		Contract terminated	

=== Loans in ===
No.	Pos	Player	Loaned from	Loan start date	Loan end date	Ref
23	MF	(Argentina) Luca Orellano	(Brazil) CR Vasco da Gama	February 23, 2024	End of 2024 season, with option to buy	
19	FW	(Venezuela) Kevin Kelsy	(Ukraine) FC Shakhtar Donetsk	April 30, 2024	End of 2024 season, with option to buy	
9	FW	(United States) Nicholas Gioacchini	(Italy) Como 1907	August 15, 2024	End of 2024 season	

=== Loans out ===
No.	Pos	Player	Loaned to	Loan start date	Loan end date	Ref
3	DF	(United States) Joey Akpunonu	(United States) Hartford Athletic	February 6, 2024	August 10, 2024	
31	MF	(Argentina) Álvaro Barreal	(Brazil) Cruzeiro Esporte Clube	March 1, 2024	Through December 2024	
25	GK	(United States) Paul Walters	(United States) Hartford Athletic	March 8, 2024	End of season	
8	MF	(Ecuador) Marco Angulo	(Ecuador) L.D.U. Quito	March 21, 2024	End of season	
29	FW	(Guatemala) Arquimides Ordóñez	(Sweden) Östersunds FK	April 4, 2024	December 31, 2024	
3	DF	(United States) Joey Akpunonu	(United States) Huntsville City FC	August 10, 2024	End of season	

=== 2024 MLS SuperDraft picks ===
Round	Pick #	Player	Pos	College	Notes
1	27	Brian Schaefer	DF	South Florida	
2	56	Kenji Mboma Dem	FW	Dayton	

== Competitions ==
Win Draw Loss

=== Preseason ===
On January 9, FC Cincinnati announced a slate of four preseason games to be played during their preseason camp in Clearwater, Florida.

January 26 Preseason	FC Cincinnati	1–2	Austin FC	St. Petersburg, Florida
12:00pm EDT	Boupendza 20'	Report	13' Noël; 68' Driussi	Stadium: Al Lang Stadium

February 1 Preseason	FC Cincinnati	2–0	New England Revolution	Bradenton, Florida
12:00pm EDT	Boupendza,	Report		Stadium: IMG Academy
Note: Played in four 30-minute periods for a total of 120 minutes

February 9 Preseason	FC Cincinnati	4–3	Philadelphia Union	Clearwater, Florida
12:00pm EDT	Acosta; Baird; Boupendza,	Report	Gazdag; McGlynn; Uhre	Stadium: Joe DiMaggio Sports Complex
Note: Played in 3 periods, 45–45–30, for a total of 120 minutes

February 15 Preseason	FC Cincinnati	5–2	New England Revolution	Clearwater, Florida
1:00pm EDT	Acosta, Boupendza; Bucha; Trialist			Stadium: Walter Campbell Sports Complex

=== Major League Soccer ===
==== League tables ====
===== Eastern Conference =====
MLS Eastern Conference table (2024)
Pos	Team	Pld	W	L	T	GF	GA	GD	Pts	Qualification
1	Inter Miami CF	34	22	4	8	79	49	+30	74	Qualification for round one, the 2025 Leagues Cup and the CONCACAF Champions Cup round one
2	Columbus Crew	34	19	6	9	72	40	+32	66	Qualification for round one and the 2025 Leagues Cup
3	FC Cincinnati	34	18	11	5	58	48	+10	59	Qualification for round one and the 2025 Leagues Cup
4	Orlando City SC	34	15	12	7	59	50	+9	52	Qualification for round one and the 2025 Leagues Cup
5	Charlotte FC	34	14	11	9	46	37	+9	51	Qualification for round one and the 2025 Leagues Cup

Source: MLS
Rules for classification: 1) points; 2) total wins; 3) total goal differential; 4) total goals scored; 5) fewer disciplinary points; 6) away goal differential; 7) away goals scored; 8) home goals differential; 9) home goals scored; 10) coin toss (2 clubs tied) or drawing of lots (≥3 clubs tied)

===== Overall =====
Overall MLS standings table
Pos	Team	Pld	W	L	T	GF	GA	GD	Pts	Qualification
3	Los Angeles FC (U)	34	19	8	7	63	43	+20	64	Qualification for the CONCACAF Champions Cup Round One (Note: As runners-up of Leagues Cup)
4	LA Galaxy (C)	34	19	8	7	69	50	+19	64	Qualification for the CONCACAF Champions Cup Round of 16 (Note: As 2024 MLS Cup champions)
5	FC Cincinnati	34	18	11	5	58	48	+10	59	Qualification for the CONCACAF Champions Cup Round One (Note: As highest-ranked club in 2024 MLS Supporters' Shield not already qualified)
6	Real Salt Lake	34	16	7	11	65	48	+17	59	Qualification for the CONCACAF Champions Cup Round One (Note: As second highest-ranked club in 2024 MLS Supporters' Shield not already qualified)
7	Seattle Sounders FC	34	16	9	9	51	35	+16	57	Qualification for the CONCACAF Champions Cup Round One (Note: As third highest-ranked club in 2024 MLS Supporters' Shield not already qualified)

Source: MLS
Rules for classification: 1) points; 2) total wins; 3) total goal differential; 4) total goals scored; 5) fewer disciplinary points; 6) away goal differential; 7) away goals scored; 8) home goals differential; 9) home goals scored; 10) coin toss (2 clubs tied) or drawing of lots (≥3 clubs tied)
(C) MLS Cup champions; (U) U.S. Open Cup winners

==== Results ====
Matchday	1	2	3	4	5	6	7	8	9	10	11	12	13	14	15	16	17	18	19	20	21	22	23	24	25	26	27	28	29	30	31	32	33	34
Stadium	H	A	H	A	H	A	H	A	A	H	A	A	H	H	A	H	A	H	H	A	A	H	H	H	A	A	H	H	A	A	H	A	H	A
Result	D	W	D	W	W	D	L	L	W	W	W	W	W	W	W	L	W	W	L	W	W	W	L	L	L	L	W	D	W	D	L	L	L	W
Conf. pos.	9	6	7	3	1	1	5	5	3	2	2	2	2	2	2	2	2	2	2	2	2	1	1	2	2	2	2	2	2	2	3	3	3	3

W = Win; D = Draw; L = Loss

February 25 1	FC Cincinnati	0–0	Toronto FC	Cincinnati, Ohio
2:30 p.m. EDT	Kubo (yellow card) 63'	Report	Osorio (yellow card) 2'; Petretta (yellow card) 34'; O'Neill (yellow card) 54'; Johnson (yellow card) 82'	Stadium: TQL Stadium; Attendance: 25,513; Referee: Jonathan Weiner

March 2 2	Chicago Fire FC	1–2	FC Cincinnati	Chicago, Illinois
8:30 p.m. EDT	Shaqiri 45' (pen.); Acosta (yellow card) 55'; Pineda (yellow card) 66'; Gutiérrez (yellow card) 90+4'	Report	Boupendza 39'; Nwobodo (yellow card) 43'; Robinson 68'; Bucha (yellow card) 81'; Baird (yellow card) 84'	Stadium: Soldier Field; Attendance: 26,582; Referee: Mario Maric

March 10 3	FC Cincinnati	0–0	D.C. United	Cincinnati, Ohio
3:00 p.m. EDT	Acosta (yellow card) 55'	Report	Herrera (yellow card) 43'; Stroud (yellow card) 51'; Klich (yellow card) 56'; Santos (yellow card) 72'	Stadium: TQL Stadium; Attendance: 25,513; Referee: Cristian Campo Hernandez

March 17 4	New England Revolution	1–2	FC Cincinnati	Foxborough, Massachusetts
2:00 p.m. EDT	Harkes (yellow card) 48'; Vroini 62', (yellow card) 90+4'; Jones (yellow card) 83'; N. Gil (yellow card) 90+8'	Report	Kubo 52'; Acosta 54', (yellow card) 72'; Yedlin (yellow card) 63'; Orellano (yellow card) 69'; Bucha (yellow card) 85'; Boupendza (yellow card) 90+9'	Stadium: Gillette Stadium; Attendance: 14,557; Referee: Richonne Clark

March 23 5	FC Cincinnati	1–0	New York City FC	Cincinnati, Ohio
7:30 p.m. EDT	Acosta (yellow card) 20', (goal) 57'	Report	Perea (yellow card) 45+5'	Stadium: TQL Stadium; Attendance: 24,282; Referee: Rafael Bonilla

March 30 6	Charlotte FC	1–1	FC Cincinnati	Charlotte, North Carolina
7:30 p.m. EDT	Diani 60'; Dejaegere (yellow card) 72'; Vargas (yellow card) 90+1'	Report	Murphy (yellow card) 65'; Boupendza (yellow card) 88', (goal) 90+2'; Celentano (yellow card) 90+1'; Nwobodo (yellow card) 90+7'	Stadium: Bank of America Stadium; Attendance: 30,043; Referee: Rubiel Vazquez

April 6 7	FC Cincinnati	1–2	New York Red Bulls	Cincinnati, Ohio
7:30 p.m. EDT	Kubo 3'; Nwobodo (yellow card) 32'; Miazga (yellow card) 45+5'; Orellano (yellow card) 74'	Report	Amaya 19', (yellow card) 70'; Vanzeir 60'; Ngoma (yellow card) 90+5'	Stadium: TQL Stadium; Attendance: 25,513; Referee: Drew Fischer

April 13 8	CF Montréal	2–1	FC Cincinnati	Montreal, Quebec
7:30 p.m. EDT	Waterman (yellow card) 29'; Piette (yellow card) 34'; Edwards (yellow card) 39'; Martínez 45+4'; Lassiter 62'	Report	Orellano (yellow card) 18'; Yedlin (yellow card) 23'; Kubo 58'; Murphy (yellow card) 66'	Stadium: Stade Saputo; Attendance: 19,619; Referee: Lukasz Szpala

April 20 9	Atlanta United	1–2	FC Cincinnati	Atlanta, Georgia
7:30 p.m. EDT	Almada 59'; Fortune (yellow card) 68'	Report	Orellano 62'; Acosta 64', (yellow card) 90+3'; Robinson (yellow card) 83'; Bucha (yellow card) 89'	Stadium: Mercedes-Benz Stadium; Attendance: 42,600; Referee: Armando Villarreal

April 27 10	FC Cincinnati	2–1	Colorado Rapids	Cincinnati, Ohio
7:30 p.m. EDT	Miazga (yellow card) 26'; Acosta 42'; Bucha (yellow card) 58'; Baird 64'	Report	Bombito 72', (yellow card) 81'	Stadium: TQL Stadium; Attendance: 25,513; Referee: Sergii Boiko

May 4 11	Orlando City SC	0–1	FC Cincinnati	Orlando, Florida
7:30 p.m. EDT	Schlegel (red card) 23'; Araújo (yellow card) 30'; Cartagena (yellow card) 62'; Jansson (yellow card) 65'; Halliday (yellow card) 90+1'	Report	Acosta 1'; Halsey (yellow card) 56' (yellow-red card) 78'; Murphy (yellow card) 66'; Valenzuela (yellow card) 90'	Stadium: Inter&Co Stadium; Attendance: 21,218; Referee: Ismail Elfath

May 11 12 – Hell Is Real Derby	Columbus Crew	1–2	FC Cincinnati	Columbus, Ohio
7:30 p.m. EDT	Zawadzki (yellow card) 38'; Camacho (yellow card) 80'; Arfsten 89'	Report	Miazga (yellow card) 34'; Kubo (yellow card) 37'; Nwobodo (yellow card) 70'; Kelsy 74'; Acosta 76'	Stadium: Lower.com Field; Attendance: 20,900; Referee: Guido Gonzales, Jr.

May 15 13	FC Cincinnati	1–0	Atlanta United	Cincinnati, Ohio
7:30 p.m. EDT	Kelsy 7'	Report	Slisz (yellow card) 23'; Giakoumakis (yellow card) 74'	Stadium: TQL Stadium; Attendance: 24,593; Referee: Ted Unkel

May 18 14	FC Cincinnati	3–1	St. Louis City SC	Cincinnati, Ohio
7:30 p.m. EDT	Acosta 26'; Murphy (yellow card) 36'; Kubo 49'; Santos 80'	Report	Kijima (yellow card) 35'; Adeniran (yellow card) 44'; Miazga 54' (o.g.)	Stadium: TQL Stadium; Attendance: 25,513; Referee: Timothy Ford

May 25 15	Toronto FC	3–4	FC Cincinnati	Toronto, Ontario
7:30 p.m. EDT	Flores 25', (yellow card) 33'; Longstaff (yellow card) 60'; Murphy 63' (o.g.); Long (yellow card) 78'; Insigne 85', (yellow card) 90+8'	Report	Orellano 53', 79', (yellow card) 60'; Kelsy 55', (yellow card) 90+10'; Robinson (yellow card) 83'; Santos 90+3'	Stadium: BMO Field; Attendance: 27,941; Referee: Victor Rivas

May 29 16	FC Cincinnati	0–2	Nashville SC	Cincinnati, Ohio
7:30 p.m. EDT		Report	Maher 25'; Shaffelburg 29'	Stadium: TQL Stadium; Attendance: 25,513; Referee: Jair Marrufo

June 15 17	San Jose Earthquakes	2–4	FC Cincinnati	San Jose, California
10:30 p.m. EDT	López 57', (yellow card) 90+4'; Espinoza 72'	Report	Bucha 53'; Kelsy (yellow card) 66'; Kubo 78', 80', 87'	Stadium: PayPal Park; Attendance: 14,182; Referee: Lukasz Szpala

June 19 18	FC Cincinnati	4–3	Philadelphia Union	Cincinnati, Ohio
7:30 p.m. EDT	Keller (yellow card) 6'; Kelsy 29'; Acosta 49', 90+10'; Orellano 60'	Report	Elliott (yellow card) 12'; Wagner (yellow card) 12'; Baribo 43', 90+1'; Bueno 55'; McGlynn (yellow card) 81'	Stadium: TQL Stadium; Attendance: 24,795; Referee: Jair Marrufo

June 22 19	FC Cincinnati	1–2	New England Revolution	Cincinnati, Ohio
7:30 p.m. EDT	Nwobodo (yellow card) 34' (yellow-red card) 69'; Powell (yellow card) 45+3'; Kubo (yellow card) 50'; Yedlin (yellow card) 54'; Orellano (yellow card) 63'; Asad 65'	Report	Veioni 21', 41', (yellow card) 81'	Stadium: TQL Stadium; Attendance: 25,513; Referee: Jon Freemon

June 29 20	FC Dallas	0–1	FC Cincinnati	Frisco, Texas
8:30 p.m. EDT	Norris (yellow card) 58'; Scott (yellow card) 82'	Report	Kubo (yellow card) 17'; Orellano 47'; Powell (yellow card) 56'; Yedlin (yellow card) 61'; Kelsy (yellow card) 65'; Celentano (yellow card) 88'; Acosta (yellow card) 90+4'	Stadium: Toyota Stadium; Attendance: 19,096; Referee: Victor Rivas

July 3 21	D.C. United	2–3	FC Cincinnati	Washington, D.C.
7:30 p.m. EDT	Santos (yellow card) 14'; Rodríguez 24'; Pirani 69'	Report	Kelsy 10', (yellow card) 51'; Bucha 39', 63'; Kubo (yellow card) 82'	Stadium: Audi Field; Attendance: 16,716; Referee: Alexis Da Silva

July 6 22	FC Cincinnati	6–1	Inter Miami CF	Cincinnati, Ohio
7:30 p.m. EDT	Kubo 10', 57'; Acosta 36'; Bucha 38'; Asad 45+4'; Nwobodo (yellow card) 55'; Valenzuela 72'; Santos (yellow card) 90'	Report	Kryvtsov 21', (yellow card) 61'; Weigandt (yellow card) 59'; Busquets (yellow card) 62' (yellow-red card) 62'	Stadium: TQL Stadium; Attendance: 25,513; Referee: Chris Penso

July 13 23	FC Cincinnati	1–3	Charlotte FC	Cincinnati, Ohio
7:30 p.m. EDT	Acosta 45+1', (yellow card) 87'; Robinson (yellow card) 59' (red card) 72'	Report	Diani (yellow card) 3'; Tavares 20'; Abada 22'; Westwood (yellow card) 45+4'; Malanda (yellow card) 47'; Byrne (yellow card) 54'; Vargas 66'; Smalls (yellow card) 90+8'	Stadium: TQL Stadium; Attendance: 25,513; Referee: Guido Gonzales, Jr.

July 17 24	FC Cincinnati	0–1	Chicago Fire	Cincinnati, Ohio
7:30 p.m. EDT	Powell (yellow card) 88' (yellow-red card) 88'; Yedlin (yellow card) 89'	Report	Herbers (yellow card) 35'; Cuypers (yellow card) 58'; Gutiérrez 69'; Koutsias (yellow card) 90+3'	Stadium: TQL Stadium; Attendance: 25,513; Referee: Filip Dujic

July 20 25	New York Red Bulls	3–1	FC Cincinnati	Harrison, New Jersey
7:30 p.m. EDT	Morgan 7', 59'; Duncan 52'; Nealis (yellow card) 80'	Report	Baird 67'; Yedlin (yellow card) 88'; Murphy (yellow card) 90'	Stadium: Red Bull Arena; Attendance: 19,828; Referee: Ted Unkel

August 24 26	Inter Miami CF	2–0	FC Cincinnati	Fort Lauderdale, Florida
7:30 p.m. EDT	Suárez 1', 6', (yellow card) 45+8'; Avilés (yellow card) 11' (yellow-red card) 42'; Alba (yellow card) 90+4'	Report	Yedlin (yellow card) 42'; Awaziem (yellow card) 45+4'; Acosta (yellow card) 65'; Robinson (yellow card) 78'	Stadium: Chase Stadium; Attendance: 20,106; Referee: Armando Villarreal

August 31 27	FC Cincinnati	4–1	CF Montréal	Cincinnati, Ohio
7:30 p.m. EDT	Robinson (yellow card) 22'; Kelsy 36'; Murphy (yellow card) 40'; Orellano 53', 57'; Santos 71'; Valenzuela (yellow card) 90+7'	Report	Waterman (yellow card) 47'; Opoku 81'; Corbo (yellow card) 86'; Álvarez (yellow card) 90+6'	Stadium: TQL Stadium; Attendance: 25,513; Referee: Jon Freemon

September 14 28 – Hell Is Real Derby	FC Cincinnati	0–0	Columbus Crew	Cincinnati, Ohio
7:30 p.m. EDT	Awaziem (yellow card) 78'; Nwobodo (yellow card) 88'	Report	Hernández (yellow card) 68'	Stadium: TQL Stadium; Attendance: 25,513; Referee: Joe Dickerson

September 18 29	Minnesota United	1–2	FC Cincinnati	Saint Paul, Minnesota
8:30 p.m. EDT	Pereyra (yellow card) 15'; Yeboah 54' (pen.)	Report	Yedlin (yellow card) 16'; Kubo 34'; Orellano 45+1'; Murphy (yellow card) 68'; Bucha (yellow card) 73'	Stadium: Allianz Field; Attendance: 19,649; Referee: Drew Fischer

September 21 30	Nashville SC	2–2	FC Cincinnati	Nashville, Tennessee
8:30 p.m. EDT	Surridge 5', 25', (yellow card) 41'; Godoy (yellow card) 75'; Lovitz (yellow card) 90'	Report	Acosta 9'; Orellano 52'; Murphy (yellow card) 74'; Yedlin (yellow card) 79'; Hadebe (yellow card) 90'	Stadium: Geodis Park; Attendance: 27,976; Referee: Sergii Demianchuk

September 28 31	FC Cincinnati	1–2	Los Angeles FC	Cincinnati, Ohio
7:30 p.m. EDT	Orellano 61'	Report	Chanot (yellow card) 5'; Palencia (yellow card) 29'; Martínez 34'; Bouanga 73'; Marlon (yellow card) 86'; Lloris (yellow card) 90+9'	Stadium: TQL Stadium; Attendance: 24,728; Referee: Ismir Pekmic

October 2 32	New York City FC	3–2	FC Cincinnati	Harrison, New Jersey
7:30 p.m. EDT	Ilenič 16'; Sands (yellow card) 41'; Martínez 65'; Thiago (yellow card) 66'; Rodríguez 75' (pen.); Perea (yellow card) 84'; Gray (yellow card) 90+1'; Wolf (yellow card) 90+14'	Report	Kelsy (yellow card) 34'; Acosta 69' (pen.); Baird 90+6'	Stadium: Red Bull Arena; Referee: Guido Gonzales, Jr.

October 5 33	FC Cincinnati	1–3	Orlando City SC	Cincinnati, Ohio
7:30 p.m. EDT	Kelsy (yellow card) 35'; Acosta 45'	Report	Enrique 10', 72'; Cartagena (yellow card) 17'; Angulo 66'; Jansson (yellow card) 90+7'	Stadium: TQL Stadium; Attendance: 24,468; Referee: Filip Dujic

October 19 34	Philadelphia Union	1–2	FC Cincinnati	Chester, Pennsylvania
7:30 p.m. EDT	Sullivan 2'; Baribo (yellow card) 38'; Elliott (yellow card) 64'; Wagner (yellow card) 80'	Report	Asad 45+4', (yellow card) 66'; Glesnes 46' (o.g.); Nwobodo (yellow card) 59'; Orellano (yellow card) 68'	Stadium: Subaru Park; Attendance: 19,016; Referee: Joe Dickerson

=== MLS Cup Playoffs ===
==== Round One ====
October 28 First leg	FC Cincinnati	1–0	New York City FC	Cincinnati, Ohio
6:45 pm EDT	Orellano (yellow card) 29'; Asad 51', (yellow card) 89'	Report	Sands (yellow card) 41'; Moralez (yellow card) 82'; Gray (red card) 90+9'	Stadium: TQL Stadium; Attendance: 21,413; Referee: Sergii Boiko

November 2 Second leg	New York City FC	3–1	FC Cincinnati	New York, New York
5:00 pm EDT	Martínez 22'; Thiago Martins 40'; Rodríguez (yellow card) 52', (goal) 90+7' (pen.); Sands (yellow card) 72'	Report	Bucha (yellow card) 43'; Yedlin (yellow card) 56'; Orellano 65'; Kubo (yellow card) 68'	Stadium: Citi Field; Attendance: 19,585; Referee: Ismir Pekmic

November 9 Third leg	FC Cincinnati	0–0 (5–6 p)	New York City FC	Cincinnati, Ohio
4:00 pm EST	Bucha (yellow card) 65'; Powell (yellow card) 85'; Awaziem (yellow card) 90'	Report	Parks (yellow card) 11'; O'Toole (yellow card) 83'; Rodríguez (yellow card) 89'	Stadium: TQL Stadium; Attendance: 22,487; Referee: Drew Fischer
	Penalties
	Acosta (penalty scored); Asad (penalty scored); Santos (penalty scored); Bucha (penalty missed); Kelsy (penalty scored); Robinson (penalty scored); Valenzuela (penalty missed); Awaziem (penalty missed); Hadebe (penalty missed)		(penalty scored) Rodríguez; (penalty scored) Bakrar; (penalty scored) Parks; (penalty scored) Sands; (penalty missed) Thiago Martins; (penalty scored) Haak; (penalty missed) O'Toole; (penalty missed) Perea; (penalty scored) Ilenič
Note: New York City FC won the series 2–1.

=== U.S. Open Cup ===
As the defending Supporters Shield winners, FC Cincinnati were set to enter the U.S. Open Cup in the Round of 32. However, due to participation in the 2024 CONCACAF Champions Cup, neither the first team nor the MLS Next Pro team will compete in the tournament following the deal reached on March 1, 2024 between MLS and US Soccer.

=== Leagues Cup ===
FC Cincinnati drew New York City FC and Club Querétaro as opponents in Group East 1 for the 2024 Leagues Cup group stage.

==== Group stage: East 1 ====
Pos	Team	Pld	W	PW	PL	L	GF	GA	GD	Pts	Qualification	CIN	NYC	QFC
1	(United States Soccer Federation) FC Cincinnati	2	2	0	0	0	5	2	+3	6	Advance to knockout stage	—	5–2	1–0
2	(United States Soccer Federation) New York City FC	2	0	1	0	1	2	4	−2	2	Advance to knockout stage	—	—	0–0
3	(Mexican Football Federation) Querétaro	2	0	0	1	1	0	1	−1	1		—	—	—

Source: Leagues Cup
Rules for classification: Tiebreakers

August 1 Group Stage	FC Cincinnati (United States)	1–0	(Mexico) Querétaro F.C.	Cincinnati, Ohio
8:00 p.m. EDT	Asad 64'; Murphy (yellow card) 83'; Celentano (yellow card) 90+2'	Report	Russo (yellow card) 48'; Lértora (yellow card) 71'; Río (yellow card) 82'	Stadium: TQL Stadium; Attendance: 24,566; Referee: Randy Encarnacion

August 5 Group Stage	FC Cincinnati (United States)	4–2	(United States) New York City FC	Cincinnati, Ohio
8:00 p.m. EDT	Nwobodo (yellow card) 78'; Bucha 79'; Asad 82'; Kubo 86'; Sérgio Santos 89'	Report	Fernández (yellow card) 33'; Rodríguez 25'; Mijatović 61'; Wolf (yellow card) 90+3'	Stadium: TQL Stadium; Attendance: 22,098; Referee: Ismael Rosario López

==== Knockout stage ====
August 9 Round of 32	FC Cincinnati (United States)	1–1 (6–5 p)	(Mexico) Santos Laguna	Cincinnati, Ohio
7:30 p.m. EDT	Orellano 11'	Report	Lozano 5'; Núñez (yellow card) 22'; Santamaría (yellow card) 34'	Stadium: TQL Stadium; Attendance: 18,014; Referee: Victor Cáceres (Mexico)
	Penalties
	Acosta (penalty scored); Kelsy (penalty scored); Orellano (penalty scored); Baird (penalty scored); Bucha (penalty scored); Santos (penalty scored)		(penalty scored) Villalba; (penalty scored) Amione; (penalty scored) Núñez; (penalty scored) Naveda; (penalty scored) Macías; (penalty missed) A. López

August 13 Round of 16	FC Cincinnati (United States)	2–4	(United States) Philadelphia Union	Cincinnati, Ohio
7:30 p.m. EDT	Robinson (yellow card) 43'; Bucha 66'; Yedlin 80'	Report	Uhre 51'; Baribo 61', 81'; Sullivan 84'; Wagner (yellow card) 90+4'	Stadium: TQL Stadium; Referee: Rubiel Vazquez

=== CONCACAF Champions Cup ===
As 2023 Major League Soccer Supporters' Shield winners, FC Cincinnati made their debut in the tournament, entering the competition in Round One. They were placed into Pot 1 as the 14th ranked team in the region for the initial draw, which was held on December 13, 2023.

Each round until the championship round is a two-legged, home-and-away series.

==== Round one ====
February 22 Round one 1st Leg	Cavalier F.C. (Jamaica)	0–2	(United States) FC Cincinnati	Kingston, Jamaica
9pm EST	King (yellow card) 90'	Report	Santos 45+5'; Pinto 87'	Stadium: Independence Park; Attendance: 650; Referee: César Arturo Ramos (Mexico)

February 28 Round one 2nd Leg	FC Cincinnati (United States)	4–0 (6–0 agg.)	(Jamaica) Cavalier F.C.	Cincinnati, United States
7pm EST	Powell 19'; Boupendza 34'; Foster 71'; Valenzuela 78'	Report	Calvin (yellow card) 12'	Stadium: TQL Stadium; Attendance: 15,307; Referee: Keylor Herrera (Costa Rica)
Note: FC Cincinnati won 6–0 on aggregate.

==== Round of 16 ====
March 7 Round of 16 1st Leg	FC Cincinnati (United States)	0–1	(Mexico) Monterrey	Cincinnati, United States
7pm EST	Nwobodo (yellow card) 26'; Baird (yellow card) 45'	Report	Vázquez 24'; Rodríguez (yellow card) 55'; Vegas (yellow card) 64'; Aguirre (red card) 70'	Stadium: TQL Stadium; Attendance: 21,175; Referee: Selvin Brown (Honduras)

March 14 Round of 16 2nd Leg	Monterrey (Mexico)	2–1 (3–1 agg.)	(United States) FC Cincinnati	Guadalupe, Mexico
10:15pm EDT	Romo 41'; Vázquez 68'; Arteaga (yellow card) 84'	Report	Murphy (yellow card) 43'; Acosta 47'; Pinto (yellow card) 87'; Valenzuela (yellow card) 90+1'	Stadium: Estadio BBVA; Attendance: 45,221; Referee: Juan Gabriel Calderón (Costa Rica)
Note: Monterrey won 3–1 on aggregate.

== Statistics ==
=== Appearances and goals ===
Numbers after plus-sign(+) denote appearances as a substitute.

No.	Pos	Nat	Player	Total		MLS		MLS Cup		Leagues Cup		Champions Cup	
No.	Pos	Nat	Player	Apps	Goals	Apps	Goals	Apps	Goals	Apps	Goals	Apps	Goals
Goalkeepers
1	GK	(United States) USA	Alec Kann	3	0	3	0	0	0	0	0	0	0
18	GK	(United States) USA	Roman Celentano	40	0	30	0	3	0	3	0	4	0
25	GK	(United States) USA	Paul Walters	1	0	0	0	0	0	1	0	0	0
36	GK	(United States) USA	Evan Louro	1	0	1	0	0	0	0	0	0	0
Defenders
2	DF	(Jamaica) JAM	Alvas Powell	25	4	10+10	0+3	0	0	2	0	1+2	1
4	DF	(United States) USA	Nick Hagglund	10	0	6+4	0	0	0	0	0	0	0
6	DF	(Nigeria) NGR	Chidozie Awaziem	14	0	7	0	3	0	3+1	0	0	0
12	DF	(United States) USA	Miles Robinson	33	1	25	1	3	0	2	0	3	0
14	DF	(United States) USA	Kipp Keller	22	0	10+6	0	0	0	1+2	0	1+2	0
15	DF	(United States) USA	Bret Halsey	27	0	3+18	0	0	0	2+1	0	2+1	0
16	DF	(Zimbabwe) ZIM	Teenage Hadebe	7	0	3+1	0	3	0	0	0	0	0
21	DF	(United States) USA	Matt Miazga	20	0	16	0	0	0	0	0	4	0
32	DF	(United States) USA	Ian Murphy	39	0	23+8	0	0	0	4	0	4	0
33	DF	(United States) USA	Isaiah Foster	1	1	0	0	0	0	0	0	0+1	1
34	DF	(United States) USA	London Aghedo	4	0	0+2	0	0	0	0+1	0	0+1	0
91	DF	(United States) USA	DeAndre Yedlin	35	1	26+2	0	3	0	2	1	2	0
Midfielders
5	MF	(Nigeria) NGR	Obinna Nwobodo	40	0	29+1	0	3	0	3+1	0	3	0
10	MF	(Argentina) ARG	Luciano Acosta	41	15	29+3	14	3	0	0+2	0	3+1	1
20	MF	(Czech Republic) CZE	Pavel Bucha	43	6	33	4	3	0	3+1	2	3	0
23	MF	(Argentina) ARG	Luca Orellano	42	12	30+3	10	3	1	4	1	1+1	0
22	MF	(United States) USA	Gerardo Valenzuela	39	2	11+19	1	0+1	0	3+1	0	1+3	1
26	MF	(United States) USA	Malik Pinto	16	1	1+10	0	0	0	1+1	0	1+2	1
27	MF	(Argentina) ARG	Yamil Asad	29	6	8+15	3	3	1	2+1	2	0	0
37	MF	(United States) USA	Stiven Jimenez	2	0	0+1	0	0	0	0	0	0+1	0
Forwards
7	FW	(Japan) JPN	Yuya Kubo	42	11	27+5	10	3	0	3+1	1	3	0
9	FW	(United States) USA	Nicholas Gioacchini	9	0	6+2	0	0+1	0	0	0	0	0
11	FW	(United States) USA	Corey Baird	30	3	11+11	3	0+1	0	3+1	0	3	0
17	FW	(Brazil) BRA	Sérgio Santos	38	5	6+21	3	0+3	0	1+3	1	1+3	1
19	FW	(Venezuela) VEN	Kevin Kelsy	29	6	16+7	6	0+2	0	1+3	0	0	0
29	FW	(United States) USA	Arquimides Ordóñez	2	0	0	0	0	0	0	0	1+1	0
Players who have played for FC Cincinnati this season but have left the club:
9	FW	(Gabon) GAB	Aaron Boupendza	17	3	5+9	2	0	0	0	0	3	1

- Last updated: November 12, 2024
- Source: Team Stats

=== Top scorers ===
Rank	Position	No.	Name	MLS	MLS Cup	Leagues Cup	Champions Cup	Total
1	MF	10	(Argentina) Luciano Acosta	14	0	0	1	15
2	FW	23	(Argentina) Luca Orellano	10	1	1	0	12
3	FW	7	(Japan) Yuya Kubo	10	0	1	0	11
4	FW	19	(Venezuela) Kevin Kelsy	6	0	0	0	6
4	MF	20	(Czech Republic) Pavel Bucha	4	0	2	0	6
4	MF	27	(Argentina) Yamil Asad	3	1	2	0	6
7	FW	17	(Brazil) Sérgio Santos	3	0	1	1	5
8	FW	9	(Gabon) Aaron Boupendza	2	0	0	1	3
8	FW	11	(United States) Corey Baird	3	0	0	0	3
10	MF	22	(United States) Gerardo Valenzuela	1	0	0	1	2
11	DF	2	(Jamaica) Alvas Powell	0	0	0	1	1
11	DF	12	(United States) Miles Robinson	1	0	0	0	1
11	MF	26	(United States) Malik Pinto	0	0	0	1	1
11	DF	33	(United States) Isaiah Foster	0	0	0	1	1
11	DF	91	(United States) DeAndre Yedlin	0	0	1	0	1
Total				57	2	8	7	74

- Last updated: November 12, 2024
- Source: Team Stats

=== Top assists ===
Rank	Position	No.	Name	MLS	MLS Cup	Leagues Cup	Champions Cup	Total
1	MF	10	(Argentina) Luciano Acosta	18	2	1	1	22
2	MF	23	(Argentina) Luca Orellano	7	0	0	0	7
3	FW	17	(Brazil) Sérgio Santos	4	1	1	0	6
3	MF	20	(Czech Republic) Pavel Bucha	5	0	1	0	6
3	MF	22	(United States) Gerardo Valenzuela	3	0	2	1	6
6	MF	27	(Argentina) Yamil Asad	5	0	0	0	5
7	DF	91	(United States) DeAndre Yedlin	3	0	0	1	4
8	MF	5	(Nigeria) Obinna Nwobodo	2	0	1	0	3
8	DF	6	(Nigeria) Chidozie Awaziem	2	0	1	0	3
8	FW	7	(Japan) Yuya Kubo	3	0	0	0	3
8	DF	42	(United States) Bret Halsey	0	0	0	3	3
12	FW	9	(Gabon) Aaron Boupendza	2	0	0	0	2
12	FW	11	(United States) Corey Baird	2	0	0	0	2
14	DF	16	(Zimbabwe) Teenage Hadebe	1	0	0	0	1
14	FW	29	(United States) Arquimides Ordóñez	0	0	0	1	1
14	DF	32	(United States) Ian Murphy	1	0	0	0	1
Total				58	3	7	7	76

- Last updated: November 12, 2024
- Source: Team Stats

=== Disciplinary record ===
No.	Pos.	Player	MLS			MLS Cup			Leagues Cup			Champions Cup			Total		
No.	Pos.	Player	Booked	(yellow card) (yellow-red card)	Sent off (straight red)	Booked	(yellow card) (yellow-red card)	Sent off (straight red)	Booked	(yellow card) (yellow-red card)	Sent off (straight red)	Booked	(yellow card) (yellow-red card)	Sent off (straight red)	Booked	(yellow card) (yellow-red card)	Sent off (straight red)
32	DF	(United States) Ian Murphy	8	0	0	0	0	0	1	0	0	1	0	0	10	0	0
5	MF	(Nigeria) Obinna Nwobodo	8	1	0	0	0	0	1	0	0	1	0	0	10	1	0
91	DF	(United States) DeAndre Yedlin	8	0	0	1	0	0	0	0	0	0	0	0	9	0	0
10	MF	(Argentina) Luciano Acosta	7	0	0	0	0	0	0	0	0	0	0	0	7	0	0
20	MF	(Czech Republic) Pavel Bucha	5	0	0	2	0	0	0	0	0	0	0	0	7	0	0
23	MF	(Argentina) Luca Orellano	6	0	0	1	0	0	0	0	0	0	0	0	7	0	0
7	MF	(Japan) Yuya Kubo	5	0	0	1	0	0	0	0	0	0	0	0	6	0	0
12	DF	(United States) Miles Robinson	5	1	0	0	0	0	1	0	0	0	0	0	6	1	0
19	FW	(Venezuela) Kevin Kelsy	6	0	0	0	0	0	0	0	0	0	0	0	6	0	0
6	DF	(Nigeria) Chidozie Awaziem	3	0	0	1	0	0	0	0	0	0	0	0	4	0	0
21	DF	(United States) Matt Miazga	3	0	0	0	0	0	0	0	0	0	0	0	3	0	0
22	MF	(United States) Gerardo Valenzuela	2	0	0	0	0	0	0	0	0	1	0	0	3	0	0
2	DF	(Jamaica) Alvas Powell	2	1	0	1	0	0	0	0	0	0	0	0	2	1	0
9	FW	(Gabon) Aaron Boupendza	2	0	0	0	0	0	0	0	0	0	0	0	2	0	0
11	FW	(United States) Corey Baird	1	0	0	0	0	0	0	0	0	1	0	0	2	0	0
18	GK	(United States) Roman Celentano	1	0	0	0	0	0	1	0	0	0	0	0	2	0	0
27	MF	(Argentina) Yamil Asad	1	0	0	1	0	0	0	0	0	0	0	0	2	0	0
14	DF	(United States) Kipp Keller	1	0	0	0	0	0	0	0	0	0	0	0	1	0	0
17	FW	(Brazil) Sérgio Santos	1	0	0	0	0	0	0	0	0	0	0	0	1	0	0
26	MF	(United States) Malik Pinto	0	0	0	0	0	0	0	0	0	1	0	0	1	0	0
15	DF	(United States) Bret Halsey	1	1	0	0	0	0	0	0	0	0	0	0	1	1	0
Total			76	4	0	8	0	0	4	0	0	5	0	0	93	4	0

- Last updated: November 12, 2024
- Source: Team Stats

=== Clean sheets ===
No.	Name	MLS	MLS Cup	Leagues Cup	Champions Cup	Total
18	(United States) Roman Celentano	6	2	1	2	11

- Last updated: November 12, 2024
- Source: Team Stats

== Awards ==
=== MLS Team of the Matchday ===
Matchday	Player	Opponent	Position	Ref
3	(Argentina) Luciano Acosta	Chicago Fire FC	MF	
3	(United States) Miles Robinson	Chicago Fire FC	DF	
5	(Argentina) Luciano Acosta	New England Revolution	MF	
5	(United States) Miles Robinson	New England Revolution	Bench	
6	(United States) Matt Miazga	New York City FC	DF	
6	(Argentina) Luciano Acosta	New York City FC	Bench	
7	(United States) Deandre Yedlin	Charlotte FC	Bench	
10	(Argentina) Luciano Acosta	Atlanta United FC	MF	
11	(Argentina) Luciano Acosta	Colorado Rapids	MF	
11	(United States) Corey Baird	Colorado Rapids	Bench	
12	(Argentina) Luciano Acosta	Orlando City SC	Bench	
13	(Argentina) Luciano Acosta	Columbus Crew	MF	
13	(United States) Pat Noonan	Columbus Crew	Coach	
14	(United States) Miles Robinson	Atlanta United FC	DF	
14	(Argentina) Luciano Acosta	Atlanta United FC	Bench	
14	(Venezuela) Kevin Kelsy	Atlanta United FC	Bench	
15	(Argentina) Luciano Acosta	St. Louis City	MF	
16	(Argentina) Luca Orellano	Toronto FC	DF	
16	(United States) Pat Noonan	Toronto FC	Coach	
20	(Argentina) Luciano Acosta	San Jose Earthquakes	MF	
20	(Japan) Yuya Kubo	San Jose Earthquakes	FW	
21	(Argentina) Luciano Acosta	Philadelphia Union	MF	
21	(Argentina) Luca Orellano	Philadelphia Union	DF	
23	(Argentina) Luca Orellano	FC Dallas	DF	
24	(Czech Republic) Pavel Bucha	D.C. United	MF	
25	(Argentina) Luciano Acosta	Inter Miami CF	MF	
25	(Argentina) Luca Orellano	Inter Miami CF	Bench	
25	(Japan) Yuya Kubo	Inter Miami CF	Bench	
25	(United States) Pat Noonan	Inter Miami CF	Coach	
30	(Argentina) Luca Orellano	CF Montréal	DF	
33	(Japan) Yuya Kubo	Minnesota United FC	MF	
34	(Argentina) Luca Orellano	Nashville SC	DF	

=== MLS Player of the Matchday ===
Matchday	Player	Opponent	Position	Ref
16	(Argentina) Luca Orellano	Toronto FC	DF	
20	(Japan) Yuya Kubo	San Jose Earthquakes	FW	
30	(Argentina) Luca Orellano	CF Montréal	DF	

=== MLS Player of the Month ===
Month	Player	Stats	Ref
May	(Argentina) Luciano Acosta	3 goals, 5 assists	

=== MLS Goal of the Matchday ===
Matchday	Player	Opponent	Position	Ref
21	(Argentina) Luca Orellano	Philadelphia Union	DF	
25	(Argentina) Luciano Acosta	Inter Miami CF	MF	
30	(Argentina) Luca Orellano	CF Montréal	DF	

=== MLS All-Star ===
Player	Position	Ref
(Argentina) Luciano Acosta	MF	
(Argentina) Luca Orellano	MF	
(United States) Miles Robinson	DF	

=== MLS League Awards ===
Player	Award	Ref
(Argentina) Luca Orellano	2024 AT&T MLS Goal of the Year	
