= MLS Goal of the Year Award =

Annual award in Major League Soccer

The MLS Goal of the Year Award (currently commercially termed "AT&T MLS Goal of the Year") is handed out annually since its inception in 1996 to a player in Major League Soccer (MLS) whose goal is selected in an on-line fan vote including the season's Goal of the Week Award winners.

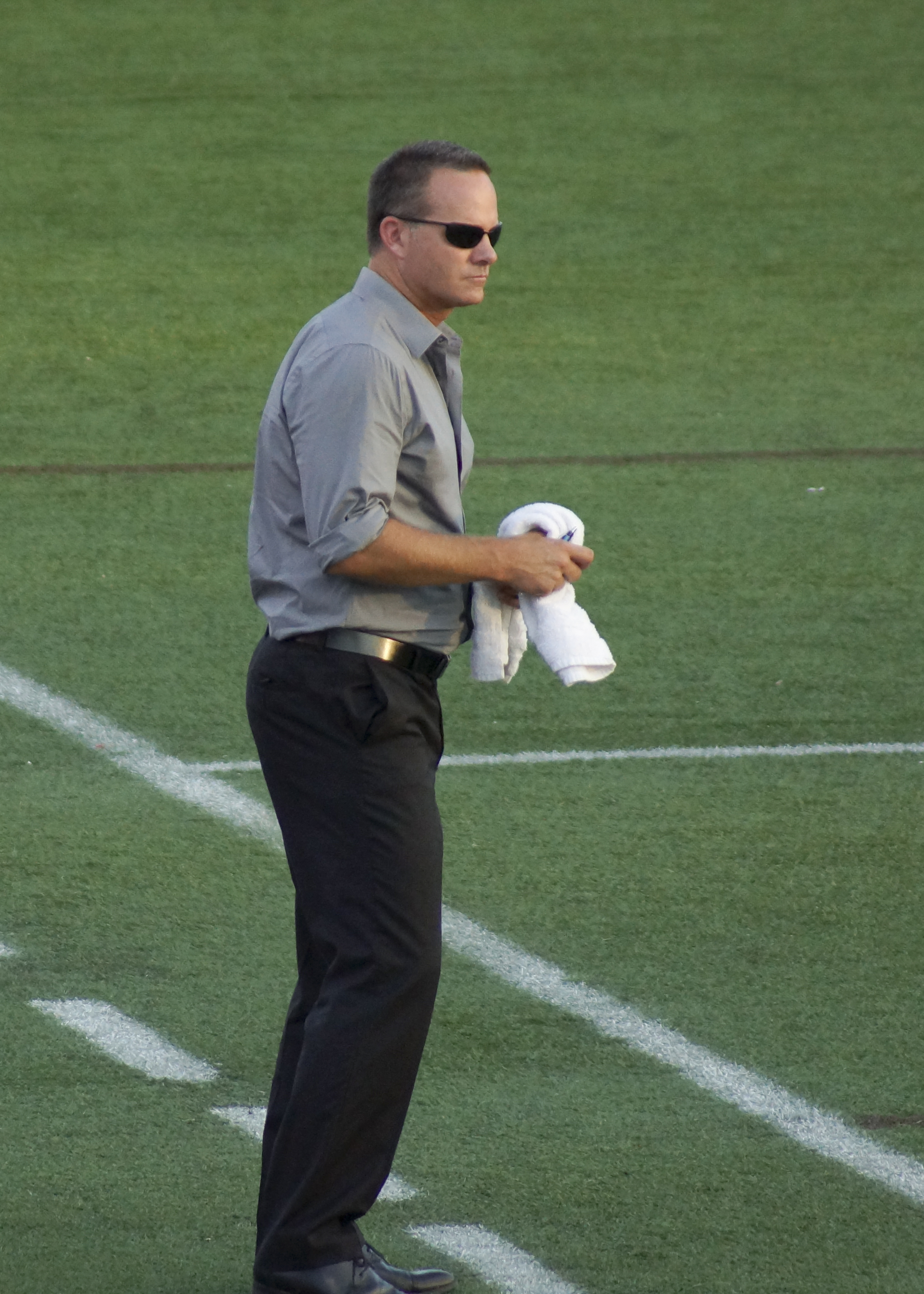
Eric Wynalda (pictured as a coach) won the inaugural award in 1996

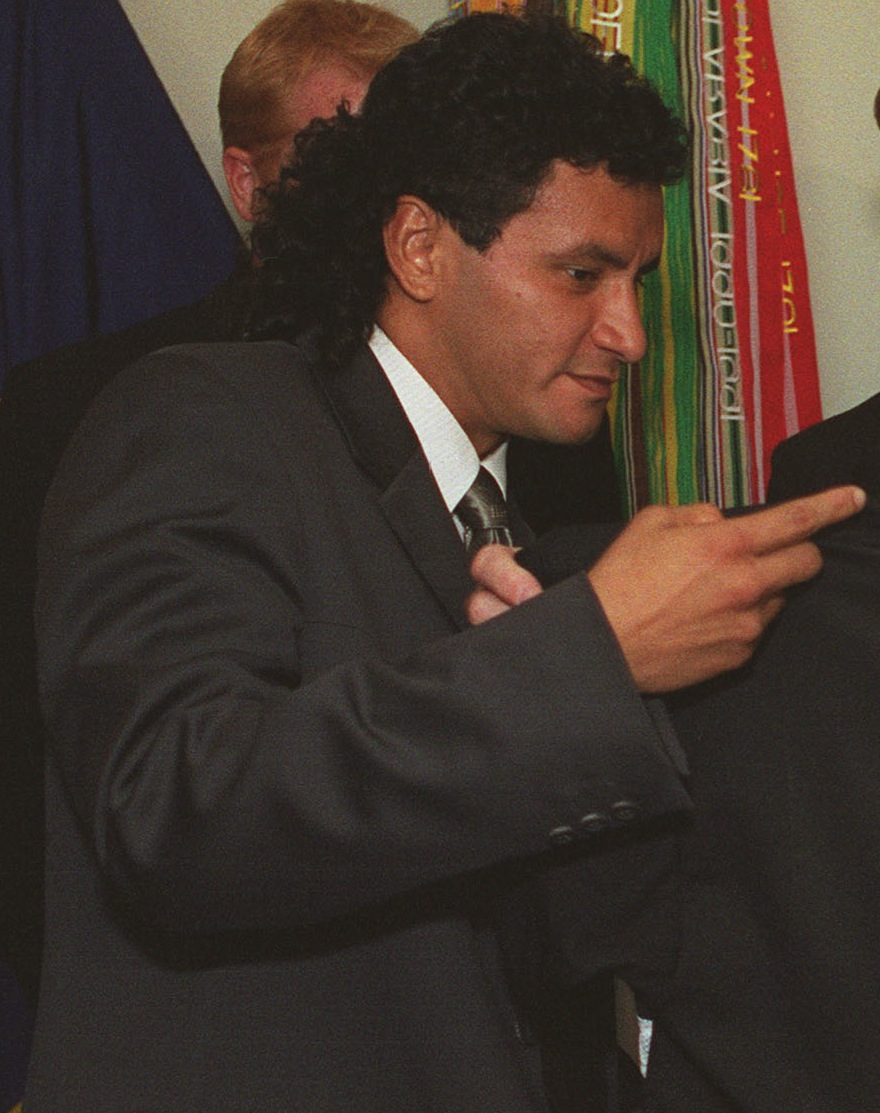
Marco Etcheverry was the first player to win the award twice

== Winners ==
| Season | Scorer | Nationality | For | Opponent | Stadium | Date | Ref. |
|---|---|---|---|---|---|---|---|
| 1996 | Eric Wynalda | United States | San Jose Clash | D.C. United | Spartan Stadium | April 6, 1996 | |
| 1997 | Marco Etcheverry | Bolivia | D.C. United | New England Revolution | RFK Stadium | August 27, 1997 | |
| 1998 | Brian McBride | United States | Columbus Crew | Chicago Fire | Ohio Stadium | July 9, 1998 | |
| 1999 | Marco Etcheverry (2) | Bolivia | D.C. United | Miami Fusion | Lockhart Stadium | May 22, 1999 | |
| 2000 | Marcelo Balboa | United States | Colorado Rapids | Columbus Crew | Columbus Crew Stadium | April 22, 2000 | |
| 2001 | Clint Mathis | United States | MetroStars | Dallas Burn | Giants Stadium | April 28, 2001 | |
| 2002 | Carlos Ruiz | Guatemala | LA Galaxy | Columbus Crew | Rose Bowl | July 27, 2002 | |
| 2003 | Damani Ralph | Jamaica | Chicago Fire | Columbus Crew | Columbus Crew Stadium | August 13, 2003 | |
| 2004 | Dwayne De Rosario | Canada | San Jose Earthquakes | D.C. United | Spartan Stadium | August 7, 2004 | |
| 2005 | Dwayne De Rosario (2) | Canada | San Jose Earthquakes | LA Galaxy | The Home Depot Center | October 15, 2005 | |
| 2006 | Brian Ching | United States | Houston Dynamo | D.C. United | Robertson Stadium | September 30, 2006 | |
| 2007 | Cuauhtémoc Blanco | Mexico | Chicago Fire | Real Salt Lake | Rice-Eccles Stadium | August 18, 2007 | |
| 2008 | Will Johnson | Canada | Real Salt Lake | FC Dallas | Rio Tinto Stadium | October 18, 2008 | |
| 2009 | Landon Donovan | United States | LA Galaxy | New England Revolution | Gillette Stadium | August 8, 2009 | |
| 2010 | Marco Pappa | Guatemala | Chicago Fire | San Jose Earthquakes | Toyota Park | April 10, 2010 | |
| 2011 | Darlington Nagbe | United States | Portland Timbers | Sporting Kansas City | Jeld-Wen Field | July 2, 2011 | |
| 2012 | Patrick Ianni | United States | Seattle Sounders FC | Sporting Kansas City | CenturyLink Field | June 20, 2012 | |
| 2013 | Camilo Sanvezzo | Brazil | Vancouver Whitecaps FC | Portland Timbers | BC Place | October 6, 2013 | |
| 2014 | Obafemi Martins | Nigeria | Seattle Sounders FC | San Jose Earthquakes | CenturyLink Field | May 17, 2014 | |
| 2015 | Krisztián Németh | Hungary | Sporting Kansas City | Portland Timbers | Providence Park | October 3, 2015 | |
| 2016 | Shkëlzen Gashi | Albania | Colorado Rapids | Vancouver Whitecaps FC | BC Place | September 24, 2016 | |
| 2017 | Héctor Villalba | Paraguay | Atlanta United FC | Orlando City SC | Orlando City Stadium | July 21, 2017 | |
| 2018 | Zlatan Ibrahimović | Sweden | LA Galaxy | Los Angeles FC | StubHub Center | March 31, 2018 | |
| 2019 | Josef Martínez | Venezuela | Atlanta United FC | FC Cincinnati | Nippert Stadium | September 18, 2019 | |
| 2020 | Darlington Nagbe (2) | United States | Columbus Crew | Chicago Fire | Mapfre Stadium | August 20, 2020 | |
| 2021 | Rubio Rubin | Guatemala | Real Salt Lake | San Jose Earthquakes | Rio Tinto Stadium | May 7, 2021 | |
| 2022 | Josef Martínez (2) | Venezuela | Atlanta United FC | New England Revolution | Gillette Stadium | October 1, 2022 | |
| 2023 | Luciano Acosta | Argentina | FC Cincinnati | Charlotte FC | TQL Stadium | September 23, 2023 | |
| 2024 | Luca Orellano | Argentina | FC Cincinnati | CF Montréal | TQL Stadium | August 31, 2024 | |
| 2025 | Son Heung-min | South Korea | Los Angeles FC | FC Dallas | Toyota Stadium | August 23, 2025 | |
| 2026 | Martín Ojeda | Argentina | Orlando City SC | D.C. United | Inter.co Stadium | October 17, 2026 | |
