= 2024 Major League Soccer season =

29th season of Major League Soccer

Major League Soccer
- Season: 2024
- Dates: February 21 – October 19 (regular season); October 22 – December 7 (playoffs)
- Teams: 29
- MLS Cup: LA Galaxy (6th title)
- Supporters' Shield: Inter Miami CF (1st shield)
- Club World Cup: Inter Miami CF
- Champions Cup (United States): Colorado Rapids; Columbus Crew; Inter Miami; FC Cincinnati; LA Galaxy; Los Angeles FC; Real Salt Lake; Seattle Sounders FC; Sporting Kansas City
- Champions Cup (Canada): Vancouver Whitecaps FC
- Matches: 493
- Goals: 1,552 (3.15 per match)
- Best player: Lionel Messi
- Top goalscorer: Christian Benteke (23 goals)
- Best goalkeeper: Stefan Frei (13 clean sheets)
- Biggest home win: Miami 5–0 Orlando (March 2); LAFC 5–0 Nashville (March 23); Seattle 5–0 Montréal (April 6); Cincinnati 6–1 Miami (July 6); Orlando 5–0 D.C. (July 6)
- Biggest away win: Montréal 0–5 New England (August 24)
- Highest scoring: 8 goals: Miami 6–2 RBNY (May 4); Salt Lake 5–3 Colorado (May 18); Dallas 5–3 Minnesota (June 19); LAFC 6–2 San Jose (June 22); Portland 4–4 St. Louis (August 24); Miami 6–2 New England (October 19)
- Longest winning run: 7 matches: Cincinnati (April 20 – May 25)
- Longest unbeaten run: 15 matches: Salt Lake (March 23 – June 19)
- Longest winless run: 11 matches: D.C. (May 15 – July 6)
- Longest losing run: 8 matches: Nashville (June 29 – August 31)
- Highest attendance: 72,610; SKC 2–3 MIA (April 13)
- Lowest attendance: 7,492; COL 2–1 DAL (April 20)
- Total attendance: 11,241,325
- Average attendance: 23,371

The 2024 Major League Soccer season was the 29th season of Major League Soccer (MLS), the top professional soccer league in the United States and Canada, and the 46th season overall of a national first-division league in the United States.

The league's 29 teams were divided into the Eastern and Western conferences. This was the first season since the 2016 season to have no new expansion teams joining MLS; San Diego FC joined the league in 2025.

Pre-season matches ran from January 19 through February 17. The regular season began on February 21 and ended on October 19, with a pause from late July to late August for the 2024 Leagues Cup, which comprised all MLS and Liga MX teams. The playoffs began on October 22 and concluded with MLS Cup 2024 on December 7. MLS only sent eight senior squads to the 2024 U.S. Open Cup as part of a compromise with the USSF that allowed most teams to be represented by MLS Next Pro teams.

The Columbus Crew were the reigning MLS Cup champions and FC Cincinnati were the Supporters' Shield holders; St. Louis City SC were the reigning Western Conference champions. In their fifth season in the league, Inter Miami CF won the Supporters' Shield for the first time, earning a league-record 74 points. The LA Galaxy won a record sixth MLS Cup, and a first since 2014, after defeating the New York Red Bulls 2–1 at Dignity Health Sports Park in Carson, California.

This was the second season that Apple and MLS were part of a ten-year partnership for the broadcast and streaming rights to all MLS and Leagues Cup games, as well as select MLS Next and MLS Next Pro games, on the MLS Season Pass service within the Apple TV app.

== Teams ==
=== Stadiums and locations ===
Locations of teams for the 2024 Major League Soccer season
Western Conference Eastern Conference

Team	Stadium	Capacity
Atlanta United FC	Mercedes-Benz Stadium	42,500
Austin FC	Q2 Stadium	20,738
Charlotte FC	Bank of America Stadium	38,000
Chicago Fire FC	Soldier Field	24,955
FC Cincinnati	TQL Stadium	26,000
Colorado Rapids	Dick's Sporting Goods Park	18,061
Columbus Crew	Lower.com Field	20,011
FC Dallas	Toyota Stadium	20,500
D.C. United	Audi Field	20,000
Houston Dynamo FC	Shell Energy Stadium	22,039
LA Galaxy	Dignity Health Sports Park	27,000
Los Angeles FC	BMO Stadium	22,000
Minnesota United FC	Allianz Field	19,400
Inter Miami CF	Chase Stadium	21,550
CF Montréal	Saputo Stadium	19,619
Nashville SC	Geodis Park	30,000
New England Revolution	Gillette Stadium	20,000
New York City FC	Yankee Stadium Citi Field	28,743; 41,992
New York Red Bulls	Red Bull Arena	25,000
Orlando City SC	Inter&Co Stadium	25,000
Philadelphia Union	Subaru Park	18,500
Portland Timbers	Providence Park	25,218
Real Salt Lake	America First Field	20,213
San Jose Earthquakes	PayPal Park	18,000
Seattle Sounders FC	Lumen Field	37,722
Sporting Kansas City	Children's Mercy Park	18,467
St. Louis City SC	CityPark	22,423
Toronto FC	BMO Field	28,351
Vancouver Whitecaps FC	BC Place	22,120

1. Non-soccer specific stadium and artificially reduced capacity. Capacity may be increased to full capacity if demand requires.
2. Temporary stadium.

=== Personnel and sponsorships ===
Note: All teams used Adidas as universal kit manufacturer. As part of Apple's broadcast contract, all MLS kits included Apple TV+ as a sleeve sponsor.

Team	Head coach	Captain	Shirt sponsor	Sleeve sponsor
Atlanta United FC	(United States) Rob Valentino (interim)	(United States) Brad Guzan	American Family Insurance	Piedmont Hospital
Austin FC	(United States) Davy Arnaud (interim)	(Argentina) Sebastián Driussi	Yeti	Netspend
Charlotte FC	(England) Dean Smith	(England) Ashley Westwood	Ally	Rugs.com
Chicago Fire FC	(United States) Gregg Berhalter	(Paraguay) Gastón Giménez	Carvana	Magellan Corporation
FC Cincinnati	(United States) Pat Noonan	(Argentina) Luciano Acosta	Mercy Health	Kroger
Colorado Rapids	(United States) Chris Armas	(United States) Keegan Rosenberry	UCHealth	—
Columbus Crew	(France) Wilfried Nancy	(United States) Darlington Nagbe	Nationwide	Tipico Sportsbook
FC Dallas	(France) Peter Luccin (interim)	(United States) Paul Arriola	Children's Health (Home) UT Southwestern (Away)	—
D.C. United	(United States) Troy Lesesne	(Belgium) Christian Benteke	Guidehouse	The Fruitist
Houston Dynamo FC	(United States) Ben Olsen	(Mexico) Héctor Herrera	MD Anderson	—
Inter Miami CF	(Argentina) Gerardo Martino	(Argentina) Lionel Messi	Royal Caribbean	Fracht Group
LA Galaxy	(United States) Greg Vanney	(Japan) Maya Yoshida	Herbalife	—
Los Angeles FC	(United States) Steve Cherundolo	(Spain) Ilie Sánchez	BMO Bank (Note: Rockstar sponsors training and special event jerseys)	Ford
Minnesota United FC	(Wales) Eric Ramsay	(United States) Wil Trapp	Target (Note: Blue Cross and Blue Shield of Minnesota sponsors training and special event jerseys)	Allianz
CF Montréal	(France) Laurent Courtois	(Canada) Samuel Piette	Bank of Montreal	Telus
Nashville SC	(United States) B.J. Callaghan	(United States) Walker Zimmerman	Renasant Bank (Note: Vanderbilt Health sponsors training and special event jerseys)	Hyundai
New England Revolution	(United States) Caleb Porter	(Spain) Carles Gil	UnitedHealth	Santander
New York City FC	(England) Nick Cushing	(Brazil) Thiago Martins	Etihad Airways (Note: Montefiore Einstein sponsors training and special event jerseys)	Capital Rx
New York Red Bulls	(Germany) Sandro Schwarz	(Sweden) Emil Forsberg	Red Bull	OANDA
Orlando City SC	(Colombia) Óscar Pareja	(Sweden) Robin Jansson	Orlando Health	Exploria
Philadelphia Union	(United States) Jim Curtin	(United States) Alejandro Bedoya	Bimbo Bakeries USA	Independence Blue Cross
Portland Timbers	(England) Phil Neville	(Colombia) Diego Chará	DaBella (1 game) Tillamook (rest of season) (Note: Dutch Bros. Coffee sponsors training and special event jerseys)	TikTok
Real Salt Lake	(United States) Pablo Mastroeni	(Colombia) Cristian Arango	Select Health	Intermountain Health
San Jose Earthquakes	(United States) Ian Russell (interim)	(United States) Jackson Yueill	Intermedia	PayPal
Seattle Sounders FC	(United States) Brian Schmetzer	(Switzerland) Stefan Frei	Providence (Note: Providence Swedish sponsors training and special event jerseys)	Emerald Queen Casino
Sporting Kansas City	(United States) Peter Vermes	(Scotland) Johnny Russell	Compass Minerals	—
St. Louis City SC	(United States) John Hackworth (interim)	(Switzerland) Roman Bürki	Purina	BJC HealthCare
Toronto FC	(England) John Herdman	(Canada) Jonathan Osorio	Bank of Montreal	LG
Vancouver Whitecaps FC	(Italy) Vanni Sartini	(Scotland) Ryan Gauld	Telus	—

=== Coaching changes ===
Team	Outgoing coach	Manner of departure	Date of vacancy	Position in table	Incoming coach	Date of appointment
Portland Timbers	(United States) Miles Joseph (interim)	End of interim period	November 6, 2023	Pre-season	(England) Phil Neville	November 6, 2023
Charlotte FC	(Italy) Christian Lattanzio	Mutual consent	November 8, 2023	Pre-season	(England) Dean Smith	December 12, 2023
CF Montréal	(Argentina) Hernán Losada	Mutual consent	November 9, 2023	Pre-season	(France) Laurent Courtois	January 8, 2024
New York Red Bulls	(United States) Troy Lesesne	End of contract	November 14, 2023	Pre-season	(Germany) Sandro Schwarz	December 14, 2023
Colorado Rapids	(Scotland) Chris Little (interim)	End of interim period	November 17, 2023	Pre-season	(United States) Chris Armas	November 17, 2023
Chicago Fire FC	(United States) Frank Klopas (interim)	End of interim period	December 5, 2023	Pre-season	(United States) Frank Klopas	December 5, 2023
Minnesota United FC	(England) Sean McAuley (interim)	End of interim period	January 5, 2024	Pre-season	(New Zealand) Cameron Knowles (interim)	January 5, 2024
D.C. United	(France) Frédéric Brillant (interim)	End of interim period	January 10, 2024	Pre-season	(United States) Troy Lesesne	January 10, 2024
New England Revolution	(United States) Clint Peay (interim)	End of interim period	December 19, 2023	Pre-season	(United States) Caleb Porter	December 19, 2023
Minnesota United FC	(New Zealand) Cameron Knowles (interim)	End of interim period	March 13, 2024	2nd in West, 3rd Overall	(Wales) Eric Ramsay	March 13, 2024
Nashville SC	(England) Gary Smith	Mutual consent	May 16, 2024	10th in East, 19th Overall	(Canada) Rumba Munthali (interim)	May 16, 2024
Atlanta United FC	(Mexico) Gonzalo Pineda	Fired	June 3, 2024	13th in East, 24th Overall	(United States) Rob Valentino (interim)	June 3, 2024
FC Dallas	(Spain) Nico Estévez	Fired	June 9, 2024	13th in West, 27th Overall	(France) Peter Luccin (interim)	June 9, 2024
San Jose Earthquakes	(United States) Luchi Gonzalez	Fired	June 24, 2024	14th in West, 29th Overall	(United States) Ian Russell (interim)	June 24, 2024
St. Louis City SC	(South Africa) Bradley Carnell	Fired	July 1, 2024	12th in West, 26th Overall	(United States) John Hackworth (interim)	July 1, 2024
Nashville SC	(Canada) Rumba Munthali (interim)	End of interim period	July 22, 2024	12th in East, 23rd Overall	(United States) B.J. Callaghan	July 31, 2024
Austin FC	(United States) Josh Wolff	Fired	October 6, 2024	10th in West, 19th Overall	(United States) Davy Arnaud (interim)	October 2024
Chicago Fire FC	(United States) Frank Klopas	Mutual consent	October 20, 2024	15th in East, 28th Overall	(United States) Gregg Berhalter	October 20, 2024

== Regular season ==
=== Format ===
The regular season consisted of 34 matches for each team, split evenly between home and away games. The opening match was played on February 21, the earliest in league history; the regular season ended with Decision Day on October 19, which comprised simultaneous intra-conference matches. Matches were paused from July 25 to August 23 for the 2024 Leagues Cup, a knockout tournament that included teams from MLS and Liga MX. The league did not pause matches for the 2024 Copa América, which was played in the United States from June to July. Most regular season matches were played on Saturdays and Wednesdays at 7:30 p.m. local time.

The 29 teams were divided into two conferences: the Eastern and Western. The 15 teams in the East played a round-robin format with intra-conference teams and six matches against six opponents from the West. The 14 teams in the West played a round-robin with intra-conference teams, an additional one or two intra-conference matches, and six to seven matches against opponents from the East. The top nine teams in each conference advanced to the 2024 MLS Cup playoffs, which began with a wild card round for the eighth and ninth placed teams, and was followed by a best-of-three series that was introduced in 2023. The remaining matches were single-elimination, and culminated with the MLS Cup final on December 7.

Several new rules were scheduled to be introduced for the 2024 season following trials in MLS Next Pro, including in-stadium announcements of video assistant referee decisions, a time limit for substitutions, and mandatory off-field checks for injured players. These initiatives were postponed by MLS due to an ongoing labor dispute with the Professional Soccer Referees Association, who organized a lockout of their referees. Replacement referees from outside the union, including former officials and those from lower-level leagues other than USL, were called in to officiate MLS matches. The referees' union and MLS reached an agreement in time for the regular referees to return to the field for Matchday 7, on March 30.

After the conclusion of the 2024 season, on January 28, 2025, MLS announced new competition regulations which determined which teams could enter the numerous cup competitions which MLS clubs could be in. With the exception of the 2025 FIFA Club World Cup, MLS teams were allowed to compete in up to two extra tournaments for the 2025 campaign. Notably, all teams that participated in the MLS Cup Playoffs were qualified retroactively for the 2025 Leagues Cup, with the exception of Vancouver Whitecaps FC, who had their place given to the expansion team San Diego FC as a result of winning the 2024 Canadian Championship (which qualified them for the 2025 CONCACAF Champions Cup). 16 US-based clubs who weren't in the Champions Cup qualified for the 2025 U.S. Open Cup Round of 32 based on performance, with teams not in both the Champions Cup and Leagues Cup given first priority.

The 2024 MLS All-Star Game was played between the MLS All-Stars and the Liga MX All-Stars on July 24.

=== Conference standings ===
MLS Eastern Conference table (2024)
Pos	Team	Pld	W	L	T	GF	GA	GD	Pts	Qualification
1	Inter Miami CF	34	22	4	8	79	49	+30	74	Qualification for round one, the Leagues Cup and the CONCACAF Champions Cup round one
2	Columbus Crew	34	19	6	9	72	40	+32	66	Qualification for round one and the Leagues Cup
3	FC Cincinnati	34	18	11	5	58	48	+10	59	Qualification for round one and the Leagues Cup
4	Orlando City SC	34	15	12	7	59	50	+9	52	Qualification for round one and the Leagues Cup
5	Charlotte FC	34	14	11	9	46	37	+9	51	Qualification for round one and the Leagues Cup
6	New York City FC	34	14	12	8	54	49	+5	50	Qualification for round one and the Leagues Cup
7	New York Red Bulls	34	11	9	14	55	50	+5	47	Qualification for round one and the Leagues Cup
8	CF Montréal	34	11	13	10	48	64	−16	43	Qualification for the wild card round and the Leagues Cup
9	Atlanta United FC	34	10	14	10	46	49	−3	40	Qualification for the wild card round and the Leagues Cup
10	D.C. United	34	10	14	10	52	70	−18	40	
11	Toronto FC	34	11	19	4	40	61	−21	37	
12	Philadelphia Union	34	9	15	10	62	55	+7	37	
13	Nashville SC	34	9	16	9	38	54	−16	36	
14	New England Revolution	34	9	21	4	37	74	−37	31	
15	Chicago Fire FC	34	7	18	9	40	62	−22	30	

Source: MLS
Rules for classification: 1) points; 2) total wins; 3) total goal differential; 4) total goals scored; 5) fewer disciplinary points; 6) away goal differential; 7) away goals scored; 8) home goals differential; 9) home goals scored; 10) coin toss (2 clubs tied) or drawing of lots (≥3 clubs tied)

MLS Western Conference table (2024)
Pos	Team	Pld	W	L	T	GF	GA	GD	Pts	Qualification
1	Los Angeles FC	34	19	8	7	63	43	+20	64	Qualification for round one, the Leagues Cup and the CONCACAF Champions Cup round one
2	LA Galaxy	34	19	8	7	69	50	+19	64	Qualification for round one and the Leagues Cup
3	Real Salt Lake	34	16	7	11	65	48	+17	59	Qualification for round one and the Leagues Cup
4	Seattle Sounders FC	34	16	9	9	51	35	+16	57	Qualification for round one and the Leagues Cup
5	Houston Dynamo FC	34	15	10	9	47	39	+8	54	Qualification for round one and the Leagues Cup
6	Minnesota United FC	34	15	12	7	58	49	+9	52	Qualification for round one and the Leagues Cup
7	Colorado Rapids	34	15	14	5	61	60	+1	50	Qualification for round one and the Leagues Cup
8	Vancouver Whitecaps FC	34	13	13	8	52	49	+3	47	Qualification for the wild card round (Note: Vancouver Whitecaps FC did not qualify for the Leagues Cup due to winning the 2024 Canadian Championship, giving them a place in the 2025 CONCACAF Champions Cup. As MLS teams could participate in no more than two cup competitions, their spot in the Leagues Cup was given to San Diego FC.)
9	Portland Timbers	34	12	11	11	65	56	+9	47	Qualification for the wild card round and the Leagues Cup
10	Austin FC	34	11	14	9	39	48	−9	42	
11	FC Dallas	34	11	15	8	54	56	−2	41	
12	St. Louis City SC	34	8	13	13	50	63	−13	37	
13	Sporting Kansas City	34	8	19	7	51	66	−15	31	
14	San Jose Earthquakes	34	6	25	3	41	78	−37	21	

Source: MLS
Rules for classification: 1) points; 2) total wins; 3) total goal differential; 4) total goals scored; 5) fewer disciplinary points; 6) away goal differential; 7) away goals scored; 8) home goals differential; 9) home goals scored; 10) coin toss (2 clubs tied) or drawing of lots (≥3 clubs tied)

=== Overall table ===
The leading team in this table won the Supporters' Shield.

Overall MLS standings table
Pos	Team	Pld	W	L	T	GF	GA	GD	Pts	Qualification
1	Inter Miami CF (S)	34	22	4	8	79	49	+30	74	Qualification for the FIFA Club World Cup group stage and the CONCACAF Champions Cup round one (Note: As 2024 MLS Supporters' Shield champions)
2	Columbus Crew (L)	34	19	6	9	72	40	+32	66	Qualification for the CONCACAF Champions Cup round of 16 (Note: As winners of Leagues Cup)
3	Los Angeles FC (U)	34	19	8	7	63	43	+20	64	Qualification for the CONCACAF Champions Cup round one (Note: As runners-up of Leagues Cup)
4	LA Galaxy (C)	34	19	8	7	69	50	+19	64	Qualification for the CONCACAF Champions Cup round of 16 (Note: As 2024 MLS Cup champions)
5	FC Cincinnati	34	18	11	5	58	48	+10	59	Qualification for the CONCACAF Champions Cup round one (Note: As highest-ranked club in 2024 MLS Supporters' Shield not already qualified)
6	Real Salt Lake	34	16	7	11	65	48	+17	59	Qualification for the CONCACAF Champions Cup round one (Note: As second highest-ranked club in 2024 MLS Supporters' Shield not already qualified)
7	Seattle Sounders FC	34	16	9	9	51	35	+16	57	Qualification for the CONCACAF Champions Cup round one (Note: As third highest-ranked club in 2024 MLS Supporters' Shield not already qualified)
8	Houston Dynamo FC	34	15	10	9	47	39	+8	54	Qualification for the U.S. Open Cup round of 32 (Note: As one of the best U.S. teams in the overall table to not qualify for the 2025 CONCACAF Champions Cup)
9	Orlando City SC	34	15	12	7	59	50	+9	52	Qualification for the U.S. Open Cup round of 32
10	Minnesota United FC	34	15	12	7	58	49	+9	52	Qualification for the U.S. Open Cup round of 32
11	Charlotte FC	34	14	11	9	46	37	+9	51	Qualification for the U.S. Open Cup round of 32
12	Colorado Rapids	34	15	14	5	61	60	+1	50	Qualification for the CONCACAF Champions Cup round one (Note: As third place of Leagues Cup)
13	New York City FC	34	14	12	8	54	49	+5	50	Qualification for the U.S. Open Cup round of 32
14	Vancouver Whitecaps FC (V)	34	13	13	8	52	49	+3	47	Qualification for the CONCACAF Champions Cup round one (Note: As winners of Canadian Championship)
15	Portland Timbers	34	12	11	11	65	56	+9	47	Qualification for the U.S. Open Cup round of 32
16	New York Red Bulls	34	11	9	14	55	50	+5	47	Qualification for the U.S. Open Cup round of 32
17	CF Montréal	34	11	13	10	48	64	−16	43	
18	Austin FC	34	11	14	9	39	48	−9	42	Qualification for the U.S. Open Cup round of 32 (Note: As one of the U.S. teams who did not qualify for the 2025 CONCACAF Champions Cup or the 2025 Leagues Cup)
19	FC Dallas	34	11	15	8	54	56	−2	41	Qualification for the U.S. Open Cup round of 32
20	Atlanta United FC	34	10	14	10	46	49	−3	40	
21	D.C. United	34	10	14	10	52	70	−18	40	Qualification for the U.S. Open Cup round of 32
22	Toronto FC	34	11	19	4	40	61	−21	37	
23	Philadelphia Union	34	9	15	10	62	55	+7	37	Qualification for the U.S. Open Cup round of 32
24	St. Louis City SC	34	8	13	13	50	63	−13	37	Qualification for the U.S. Open Cup round of 32
25	Nashville SC	34	9	16	9	38	54	−16	36	Qualification for the U.S. Open Cup round of 32
26	New England Revolution	34	9	21	4	37	74	−37	31	Qualification for the U.S. Open Cup round of 32
27	Sporting Kansas City	34	8	19	7	51	66	−15	31	Qualification for the CONCACAF Champions Cup round one (Note: Sporting Kansas City qualified as 2024 U.S. Open Cup finalists as the winners, Los Angeles FC, had already qualified via the 2024 Leagues Cup.)
28	Chicago Fire FC	34	7	18	9	40	62	−22	30	Qualification for the U.S. Open Cup round of 32
29	San Jose Earthquakes	34	6	25	3	41	78	−37	21	Qualification for the U.S. Open Cup round of 32

Source: MLS
Rules for classification: 1) points; 2) total wins; 3) total goal differential; 4) total goals scored; 5) fewer disciplinary points; 6) away goal differential; 7) away goals scored; 8) home goals differential; 9) home goals scored; 10) coin toss (2 clubs tied) or drawing of lots (≥3 clubs tied)
(C) MLS Cup champions; (L) Leagues Cup winners; (S) Supporters' Shield winners; (U) U.S. Open Cup winners; (V) Canadian Championship winners

=== MLS All-Star Game ===
2024 MLS All-Star Game
July 24, 2024
8:30 p.m. EDT

MLS All-Stars (United States Soccer Federation) (Canadian Soccer Association)	1–4	(Mexican Football Federation) Liga MX All-Stars
Hernández 17'	Report	Berterame 16'; Idrissi 41'; Brunetta 68'; Meza 69'

Lower.com Field, Columbus, Ohio
Attendance: 20,931
Referee: Guido Gonzales Jr. (United States)

== MLS Cup playoffs ==
=== Bracket ===
The higher seeded teams hosted single-elimination matches, with the MLS Cup host determined by overall points in the Supporters' Shield table. During the best-of-three round, the team with higher seed hosted the first match and the third match if necessary.

Wild card single match
E8	CF Montréal	2 (4)
E9	Atlanta United FC	2 (5)
W8	Vancouver Whitecaps FC	5
W9	Portland Timbers	0

Round one best-of-three series
E1	Inter Miami CF	2	1	2
E9	Atlanta United FC	1	2	3
E4	Orlando City SC	2	0 (1)	1 (4)
E5	Charlotte FC	0	0 (3)	1 (1)
E3	FC Cincinnati	1	1	0 (5)
E6	New York City FC	0	3	0 (6)
E2	Columbus Crew	0	2 (4)	–
E7	New York Red Bulls	1	2 (5)	–
W1	Los Angeles FC	2	0	1
W8	Vancouver Whitecaps FC	1	3	0
W4	Seattle Sounders FC	0 (5)	1 (7)	–
W5	Houston Dynamo FC	0 (4)	1 (6)	–
W3	Real Salt Lake	0 (4)	1 (1)	–
W6	Minnesota United FC	0 (5)	1 (3)	–
W2	LA Galaxy	5	4	–
W7	Colorado Rapids	0	1	–

Conference semifinals single match
E9	Atlanta United FC	0
E4	Orlando City SC	1
Eastern Conference
E6	New York City FC	0
E7	New York Red Bulls	2
W1	Los Angeles FC	1
W4	Seattle Sounders FC (a.e.t.)	2
Western Conference
W6	Minnesota United FC	2
W2	LA Galaxy	6

Conference finals single match
E4	Orlando City SC	0
E7	New York Red Bulls	1
W4	Seattle Sounders FC	0
W2	LA Galaxy	1

MLS Cup single match
E7	New York Red Bulls	1
W2	LA Galaxy	2

=== MLS Cup ===
December 7, 2024
1:10 p.m. PST

LA Galaxy	2–1	New York Red Bulls
Paintsil 9'; Joveljić 13'	Report	S. Nealis 28'

Dignity Health Sports Park, Carson, California
Attendance: 26,812
Referee: Guido Gonzales Jr.

== Attendance ==
=== Average home attendances ===
As of May 15, 2024

Rank	Team	GP	Cumulative	High	Low	Mean
1	Atlanta United FC	17	796,120	67,795	42,501	46,831
2	Charlotte FC	17	597,405	62,291	26,899	35,141
3	Seattle Sounders FC	17	522,812	36,341	29,244	30,754
4	New England Revolution	17	496,446	65,612	14,557	29,203
5	Nashville SC	17	485,980	30,109	26,842	28,587
6	LA Galaxy	17	444,303	70,076	19,302	26,135
7	Vancouver Whitecaps FC	17	444,055	51,035	17,361	26,121
8	Toronto FC	17	436,582	30,217	21,355	25,681
9	FC Cincinnati	17	429,022	25,513	24,282	25,237
10	New York City FC	17	395,858	44,738	10,785	23,286
11	Orlando City SC	17	387,676	25,046	20,985	22,804
12	St. Louis City SC	17	381,730	22,500	22,423	22,455
13	Los Angeles FC	17	376,065	22,321	22,010	22,121
14	Portland Timbers	17	373,136	25,218	19,113	21,949
15	Chicago Fire FC	17	362,576	55,385	11,372	21,328
16	Sporting Kansas City	17	360,279	72,610	14,826	21,193
17	Inter Miami CF	17	356,643	21,550	19,939	20,979
18	Austin FC	17	352,545	20,738	20,738	20,738
19	Columbus Crew	17	349,186	20,927	20,314	20,540
20	Real Salt Lake	17	344,503	21,570	19,268	20,265
21	New York Red Bulls	17	342,474	25,291	15,128	20,146
22	CF Montréal	17	333,523	19,619	19,619	19,619
23	Minnesota United FC	17	333,143	19,906	18,722	19,597
24	FC Dallas	17	324,632	19,096	19,096	19,096
25	Philadelphia Union	17	320,369	19,513	18,513	18,845
26	D.C. United	17	308,333	19,365	15,899	18,137
27	San Jose Earthquakes	17	297,509	43,774	10,104	17,501
28	Houston Dynamo FC	17	294,473	22,039	14,282	17,322
29	Colorado Rapids	17	260,720	18,183	7,492	15,336
Total		493	11,509,475	72,610	7,492	23,346

=== Highest attendances ===
Regular season

Rank	Home team	Score	Away team	Attendance	Date	Matchday	Stadium	Ref.
1	Sporting Kansas City	2–3	Inter Miami CF	72,610	April 13, 2024	9	Arrowhead Stadium	
2	LA Galaxy	1–2	Los Angeles FC	70,076	July 4, 2024	24	Rose Bowl	
3	Atlanta United FC	2–2	Inter Miami CF	67,795	September 18, 2024	33	Mercedes-Benz Stadium	
4	Atlanta United FC	4–1	New England Revolution	67,727	March 9, 2024	4	Mercedes-Benz Stadium	
5	New England Revolution	1–4	Inter Miami CF	65,612	April 27, 2024	11	Gillette Stadium	
6	Charlotte FC	1–0	New York City FC	62,291	February 24, 2024	2	Bank of America Stadium	
7	Atlanta United FC	2–3	Charlotte FC	61,209	June 2, 2024	18	Mercedes-Benz Stadium	
8	Chicago Fire FC	1–4	Inter Miami CF	55,385	August 31, 2024	30	Soldier Field	
9	Vancouver Whitecaps FC	1–2	Inter Miami CF	51,035	May 25, 2024	16	BC Place	
10	Charlotte FC	1–2	Inter Miami CF	47,218	July 3, 2024	24	Bank of America Stadium	

2024 MLS Cup playoffs

Rank	Home team	Score	Away team	Attendance	Date	Stadium	Ref.
1	Atlanta United FC	2–1	Inter Miami CF	68,455	November 3, 2024	Mercedes-Benz Stadium	
2	Charlotte FC	0–0 (3–1 pen.)	Orlando City SC	40,238	November 1, 2024	Bank of America Stadium	
3	Seattle Sounders FC	0–0 (5–4 pen.)	Houston Dynamo FC	30,026	October 28, 2024	Lumen Field	
4	LA Galaxy	1–0	Seattle Sounders FC	26,327	November 30, 2024	Dignity Health Sports Park	
5	LA Galaxy	6–2	Minnesota United FC	26,192	November 24, 2024	Dignity Health Sports Park	
6	Orlando City SC	1–0	Atlanta United FC	25,046	November 24, 2024	Inter&Co Stadium	
7	Orlando City SC	0–1	New York Red Bulls	25,046	November 30, 2024	Inter&Co Stadium	
8	New York City FC	0–2	New York Red Bulls	24,891	November 23, 2024	Citi Field	
9	LA Galaxy	5–0	Colorado Rapids	24,537	October 26, 2024	Dignity Health Sports Park	
10	FC Cincinnati	0–0 (5–6 pen.)	New York City FC	22,487	November 9, 2024	TQL Stadium	

== Player statistics ==
=== Goals ===
Rank	Player	Club	Goals
1	(Belgium) Christian Benteke	D.C. United	23
2	(Gabon) Denis Bouanga	Los Angeles FC	20
2	(Argentina) Lionel Messi	Inter Miami CF	20
2	(Uruguay) Luis Suárez	Inter Miami CF	20
5	(Colombia) Cucho Hernández	Columbus Crew	19
6	(Colombia) Cristian Arango	Real Salt Lake	17
6	(Hungary) Dániel Gazdag	Philadelphia Union	17
8	(Costa Rica) Alonso Martínez	New York City FC	16
8	(Croatia) Petar Musa	FC Dallas	16
8	(Brazil) Gabriel Pec	LA Galaxy	16
8	(Uruguay) Jonathan Rodríguez	Portland Timbers	16

=== Hat-tricks ===
Player	For	Against	Score	Date
(Belgium) Christian Benteke	D.C. United	New England Revolution	3–1 (H)	February 24, 2024
(Greece) Giorgos Giakoumakis	Atlanta United FC	New England Revolution	4–1 (H)	March 9, 2024
(Scotland) Lewis Morgan	New York Red Bulls	Inter Miami CF	4–0 (H)	March 23, 2024
(Colombia) Cristian Arango	Real Salt Lake	St. Louis City SC	3–1 (H)	March 30, 2024
(Uruguay) Luis Suárez	Inter Miami CF	New York Red Bulls	6–2 (H)	May 4, 2024
(England) Sam Surridge	Nashville SC	CF Montréal	4–1 (H)	May 4, 2024
(Belgium) Christian Benteke	D.C. United	Atlanta United FC	2–3 (A)	May 11, 2024
(Italy) Federico Bernardeschi	Toronto FC	CF Montréal	5–1 (H)	May 18, 2024
(Costa Rica) Alonso Martínez	New York City FC	San Jose Earthquakes	5–1 (H)	May 31, 2024
(Colombia) Cristian Arango	Real Salt Lake	Austin FC	5–1 (H)	June 1, 2024
(Japan) Yuya Kubo	FC Cincinnati	San Jose Earthquakes	2–4 (A)	June 15, 2024
(Croatia) Petar Musa	FC Dallas	Minnesota United FC	5–3 (H)	June 19, 2024
(United States) Djordje Mihailovic	Colorado Rapids	St. Louis City SC	0–3 (A)	June 19, 2024
(Colombia) Cucho Hernández	Columbus Crew	Sporting Kansas City	4–0 (H)	June 22, 2024
(Paraguay) Sebastián Ferreira	Houston Dynamo FC	D.C. United	1–4 (A)	June 22, 2024
(Poland) Mateusz Bogusz	Los Angeles FC	Colorado Rapids	3–0 (H)	June 29, 2024
(United States) Brian White	Vancouver Whitecaps FC	St. Louis City SC	4–3 (H)	June 29, 2024
(Israel) Tai Baribo	Philadelphia Union	New England Revolution	5–1 (H)	July 17, 2024
(Hungary) Dániel Gazdag	Philadelphia Union	Nashville SC	3–0 (H)	July 20, 2024
(Slovakia) Albert Rusnák	Seattle Sounders FC	Columbus Crew	0–4 (A)	September 7, 2024
(Romania) Alexandru Mățan	Columbus Crew	New England Revolution	4–0 (H)	October 12, 2024
(Argentina) Lionel Messi	Inter Miami CF	New England Revolution	6–2 (H)	October 19, 2024

Notes

(H) – Home team
(A) – Away team

=== Assists ===
Rank	Player	Club	Assists
1	(Argentina) Luciano Acosta	FC Cincinnati	19
1	(Brazil) Evander	Portland Timbers	19
3	(Argentina) Lionel Messi	Inter Miami CF	16
3	(Slovakia) Albert Rusnák	Seattle Sounders FC	16
5	(Scotland) Ryan Gauld	Vancouver Whitecaps FC	15
5	(Finland) Robin Lod	Minnesota United FC	15
5	(Spain) Riqui Puig	LA Galaxy	15
8	(Spain) Jordi Alba	Inter Miami CF	14
8	(Argentina) Cristian Espinoza	San Jose Earthquakes	14
8	(Colombia) Cucho Hernández	Columbus Crew	14
8	(United States) Djordje Mihailovic	Colorado Rapids	14
8	(Colombia) Santiago Moreno	Portland Timbers	14
8	(Brazil) Gabriel Pec	LA Galaxy	14

=== Clean sheets ===
Rank	Player	Club	Clean sheets
1	(Switzerland) Stefan Frei	Seattle Sounders FC	13
2	(Croatia) Kristijan Kahlina	Charlotte FC	12
2	(France) Hugo Lloris	Los Angeles FC	12
4	(United States) Patrick Schulte	Columbus Crew	10
5	(United States) Steve Clark	Houston Dynamo FC	8
5	(Peru) Pedro Gallese	Orlando City SC	8
5	(Canada) Jonathan Sirois	CF Montréal	8
5	(United States) Brad Stuver	Austin FC	8
5	(United States) Joe Willis	Nashville SC	8
10	(Switzerland) Roman Bürki	St. Louis City SC	7
10	(United States) Roman Celentano	FC Cincinnati	7
10	(Canada) Dayne St. Clair	Minnesota United FC	7
10	(Japan) Yohei Takaoka	Vancouver Whitecaps FC	7

== Awards ==
=== Team/Player of the Matchday ===
- **Bold** denotes the Player of the Matchday.

Team of the Matchday
Matchday	Goalkeeper	Defenders	Midfielders	Forwards	Bench	Coach
1+2	(United States) Callender (MIA)	(Mexico) Campos (LAFC) (France) Malanda (CLT) (Iceland) Þórhallsson (ORL)	(United States) Gutiérrez (CHI) (Spain) Puig (LA) (Spain) Illarramendi (DAL) (Finland) Lod (MIN)	(Brazil) Antony (POR) (Belgium) **Benteke** (DC) (Argentina) Messi (MIA)	(United States) Johnson (TOR) (United States) Sealy (DAL) (Honduras) Flores (TOR) (United States) A. Morris (CLB) (United States) Williamson (POR) (Spain) Gil (NE) (Sweden) Forsberg (RBNY) (Poland) Bogusz (LAFC) (Colombia) Arango (RSL)	(England) Phil Neville (POR)
3	(United States) Johnson (TOR)	(Sweden) Eile (RBNY) (United States) Robinson (CIN) (Guatemala) Aaron Herrera (DC)	(Brazil) Pompeu (STL) (Argentina) L. Acosta (CIN) (United States) Gressel (MIA) (Colombia) A. Gómez (RSL)	(Ghana) Paintsil (LA) (Uruguay) **Suárez** (MIA) (Argentina) Messi (MIA)	(Canada) Sirois (MTL) (Sweden) Nilsson (STL) (Japan) Yamane (LA) (Colombia) Valencia (ATX) (United States) Bedoya (PHI) (Colombia) Moreno (POR) (Italy) Insigne (TOR) (Colombia) Arango (RSL) (Colombia) Hernández (CLB)	(Argentina) Gerardo Martino (MIA)
4	(France) Lloris (LAFC)	(Spain) Alba (MIA) (Colombia) Álvarez (MTL) (Algeria) Farsi (CLB)	(United States) Bassett (COL) (Spain) Puig (LA) (Sweden) Forsberg (RBNY) (Brazil) Evander (POR)	(Italy) Insigne (TOR) (Greece) **Giakoumakis** (ATL) (Finland) Pukki (MIN)	(United States) Bono (DC) (Canada) Ahmed (VAN) (United States) Lennon (ATL) (Canada) Choinière (MTL) (Argentina) Almada (ATL) (Brazil) Pompeu (STL) (Brazil) Antony (POR) (Canada) Russell-Rowe (CLB) (United States) McGuire (ORL)	(France) Laurent Courtois (MTL)
5	(Switzerland) Bürki (STL)	(United States) O'Toole (NYC) (Colombia) Rosero (SKC) (Republic of Ireland) Gallagher (ATX)	(United States) K. Acosta (CHI) (United States) A. Morris (CLB) (Argentina) L. Acosta (CIN) (Argentina) Redondo (MIA)	(Uruguay) **Suárez** (MIA) (Colombia) Hernández (CLB) (Greece) Giakoumakis (ATL)	(Russia) Thomas (SEA) (United States) Robinson (CIN) (United States) Dotson (MIN) (United States) Muyl (NSH) (Ghana) Paintsil (LA) (Uruguay) Cóccaro (MTL) (Nigeria) Aliyu (HOU) (Ecuador) Campana (MIA) (United States) White (VAN)	(Wales) Eric Ramsay (MIN)
6	(Germany) Semmle (PHI)	(Australia) Smith (HOU) (United States) Miazga (CIN) (Trinidad and Tobago) Spicer (TOR)	(Mexico) Barajas (RSL) (Colombia) Atuesta (LAFC) (United States) Delgado (LA) (Gabon) Bouanga (LAFC)	(Scotland) **Morgan** (RBNY) (Belgium) Vanzeir (RBNY) (Argentina) Carranza (PHI)	(United States) McCarthy (LA) (Ghana) Yaro (STL) (England) Westwood (CLT) (Argentina) L. Acosta (CIN) (Spain) Puig (LA) (Italy) Bernardeschi (TOR) (Argentina) Espinoza (SJ) (Belgium) Benteke (DC) (United States) Lynn (ORL)	(United States) Jim Curtin (PHI)
7	(United States) Freese (NYC)	(Argentina) Escobar (HOU) (England) Elliott (PHI) (Costa Rica) Cascante (ATX) (United States) Davis (SKC)	(Brazil) Pec (LA) (United States) Mihailovic (COL) (Poland) Klich (DC) (Haiti) Picault (VAN)	(Colombia) **Arango** (RSL) (Senegal) Thiaré (ATL)	(United States) Yarbrough (SJ) (United States) Yedlin (CIN) (Brazil) Artur (HOU) (France) Walter (SKC) (Scotland) Gauld (VAN) (Brazil) Evander (POR) (Colombia) Hinestroza (CLB) (Canada) Shaffelburg (NSH) (Scotland) Morgan (RBNY)	(United States) Peter Vermes (SKC)
8	(Indonesia) Paes (DAL)	(Honduras) Ruiz (MIA) (Serbia) Veselinović (VAN) (El Salvador) A. Roldan (SEA)	(United States) Tillman (LAFC) (Argentina) Driussi (ATX) (Switzerland) Shaqiri (CHI) (Austria) Schöpf (VAN)	(Belgium) Vanzeir (RBNY) (Nigeria) Agada (SKC) (Peru) **Ruidíaz** (SEA)	(Japan) Takaoka (VAN) (United States) S. Nealis (RBNY) (United States) A. Morris (CLB) (Hungary) Gazdag (PHI) (Slovakia) Rusnák (SEA) (Spain) Gil (NE) (Argentina) Espinoza (SJ) (Argentina) Messi (MIA) (Chile) Mora (POR)	(Germany) Sandro Schwarz (RBNY)
9	(United States) Freese (NYC)	(United States) Wiley (ATL) (United States) Bartlow (HOU) (Germany) Wagner (PHI)	(Germany) Thommy (SKC) (Brazil) Evander (POR) (Paraguay) D. Gómez (MIA) (Ghana) Paintsil (LA)	(Poland) Bogusz (LAFC) (Brazil) Navarro (COL) (Argentina) **Messi** (MIA)	(United States) Steffen (COL) (Denmark) Amundsen (CLB) (Guatemala) Aaron Herrera (DC) (United States) Parks (NYC) (Uruguay) Lodeiro (ORL) (Israel) Abada (CLT) (Venezuela) J. Martínez (MTL) (Germany) Owusu (TOR) (Brazil) Klauss (STL)	(United States) Ben Olsen (HOU)
10	(United States) Johnson (TOR)	(Greece) Katranis (RSL) (Cape Verde) Moreira (CLB) (Norway) Totland (STL)	(Brazil) Pec (LA) (Argentina) L. Acosta (CIN) (Uruguay) S. Rodríguez (NYC) (Finland) Lod (MIN)	(Gabon) Bouanga (LAFC) (Colombia) **Arango** (RSL) (Argentina) Messi (MIA)	(United States) Stuver (ATX) (United States) Padelford (MIN) (Spain) Busquets (MIA) (Germany) Thommy (SKC) (Sweden) Forsberg (RBNY) (Scotland) Gauld (VAN) (Colombia) Angulo (ORL) (Ghana) Paintsil (LA) (Brazil) Klauss (STL)	(Wales) Eric Ramsay (MIN)
11	(United States) Brady (CHI)	(Greece) Katranis (RSL) (United States) Ibeagha (DAL) (Honduras) Rosales (MIN)	(Uruguay) S. Rodríguez (NYC) (United States) Tillman (LAFC) (Argentina) L. Acosta (CIN) (Italy) Bernardeschi (TOR)	(Colombia) Obrian (ATX) (Belgium) Benteke (DC) (Argentina) **Messi** (MIA)	(Canada) Sirois (MTL) (Republic of Ireland) Long (TOR) (Spain) Busquets (MIA) (United States) Parks (NYC) (United States) Skahan (SJ) (Gabon) Bouanga (LAFC) (United States) Baird (CIN) (United States) White (VAN) (Croatia) Musa (DAL)	(United States) Josh Wolff (ATX)
12	(Switzerland) Bürki (STL)	(Colombia) Vera (RSL) (Brazil) Rodrigues (SJ) (Honduras) Arriaga (MIN)	(Italy) Bernardeschi (TOR) (United States) Bassett (COL) (Paraguay) Rojas (MIA) (Argentina) Espinoza (SJ)	(Uruguay) Suárez (MIA) (England) Surridge (NSH) (Argentina) **Messi** (MIA)	(United States) Stuver (ATX) (United States) Zimmerman (NSH) (Serbia) Petković (CLT) (United States) McGlynn (PHI) (Sweden) Forsberg (RBNY) (Argentina) L. Acosta (CIN) (United States) Stroud (DC) (Germany) Mukhtar (NSH) (Argentina) Chancalay (NE)	(United States) Luchi Gonzalez (SJ)
13	(United States) Freese (NYC)	(Brazil) Costa (SJ) (United States) Privett (CLT) (United States) Dorsey (HOU)	(Gabon) Bouanga (LAFC) (Argentina) L. Acosta (CIN) (Paraguay) Rojas (MIA) (Uruguay) Olivera (LAFC)	(Brazil) Klauss (STL) (Belgium) **Benteke** (DC) (Colombia) Muriel (ORL)	(Peru) Gallese (ORL) (Mexico) H. Herrera (HOU) (United States) C. Roldan (SEA) (Uruguay) Lodeiro (ORL) (Spain) Puig (LA) (Scotland) Morgan (RBNY) (Argentina) Espinoza (SJ) (Croatia) Musa (DAL) (Colombia) Arango (RSL)	(United States) Pat Noonan (CIN)
14	(France) Lloris (LAFC)	(United States) Robinson (CIN) (United States) Zimmerman (NSH) (Cape Verde) Moreira (CLB)	(United States) Luna (RSL) (England) Westwood (CLT) (United States) Amaya (RBNY) (Argentina) Driussi (ATX)	(Gabon) **Bouanga** (LAFC) (Uruguay) J. Rodríguez (POR) (Austria) Wolf (NYC)	(Paraguay) Coronel (RBNY) (France) Malanda (CLT) (Honduras) Rosales (MIN) (United States) Arfsten (CLB) (United States) Tillman (LAFC) (Argentina) L. Acosta (CIN) (Brazil) Evander (POR) (Venezuela) Kelsy (CIN) (Brazil) Navarro (COL)	(Germany) Sandro Schwarz (RBNY)
15	(Croatia) Kahlina (CLT)	(Denmark) Sviatchenko (HOU) (France) Camacho (CLB) (Peru) Cartagena (ORL)	(Argentina) L. Acosta (CIN) (Hungary) Gazdag (PHI) (Venezuela) Pereira (ATX) (Finland) Lod (MIN)	(Austria) Wolf (NYC) (Colombia) Arango (RSL) (Italy) **Bernardeschi** (TOR)	(Indonesia) Paes (DAL) (Jamaica) Gray (NYC) (Honduras) Flores (TOR) (Poland) Slisz (ATL) (Colombia) A. Gómez (RSL) (Colombia) Obrian (ATX) (Scotland) Gauld (VAN) (Ecuador) Campana (MIA) (United States) Lynn (ORL)	(England) Nick Cushing (NYC)
16	(United States) Freese (NYC)	(Argentina) **Orellano** (CIN) (Canada) Waterman (MTL) (Japan) Yamane (LA)	(Finland) Taylor (MIA) (Spain) Puig (LA) (Brazil) Evander (POR) (Ecuador) Julio (RSL)	(Italy) Insigne (TOR) (Uruguay) Rossi (CLB) (South Korea) Jeong (MIN)	(Croatia) Kahlina (CLT) (United States) Hines-Ike (ATX) (United States) A. Morris (CLB) (United States) Parks (NYC) (Ecuador) Delgado (DAL) (Slovakia) Rusnák (SEA) (Poland) Bogusz (LAFC) (France) Cabral (COL) (Chile) Mora (POR)	(United States) Pat Noonan (CIN)
17	(United States) Tarbell (HOU)	(United States) Long (LAFC) (United States) Maher (NSH) (Norway) Gregersen (ATL)	(Sweden) Forsberg (RBNY) (Germany) Mukhtar (NSH) (Scotland) Gauld (VAN) (Brazil) Evander (POR)	(Nigeria) Ibrahim (MTL) (Serbia) Joveljic (LA) (Georgia (country)) **Lobjanidze** (ATL)	(Canada) Pantemis (POR) (Argentina) Aude (LA) (France) Muyumba (ATL) (Spain) Puig (LA) (Morocco) Bassi (HOU) (Costa Rica) Lassiter (MTL) (Colombia) A. Gómez (RSL) (Poland) Bogusz (LAFC) (Belgium) Benteke (DC)	(Mexico) Gonzalo Pineda (ATL)
18	(Slovenia) Ivačič (NE)	(Spain) Alba (MIA) (Luxembourg) Chanot (LAFC) (United States) Tolkin (RBNY)	(Israel) Abada (CLT) (Spain) Gil (NE) (Uruguay) S. Rodríguez (NYC) (Argentina) Messi (MIA)	(Colombia) **Arango** (RSL) (Costa Rica) A. Martínez (NYC) (Canada) Oluwaseyi (MIN)	(France) Lloris (LAFC) (Honduras) Arriaga (MIN) (Mexico) H. Herrera (HOU) (Poland) Klich (DC) (United States) Gutiérrez (CHI) (Argentina) Moralez (NYC) (Gabon) Bouanga (LAFC) (Scotland) Gauld (VAN) (Ecuador) Julio (RSL)	(England) Nick Cushing (NYC)
19	(Slovenia) **Ivačič** (NE)					
20	(Indonesia) Paes (DAL)	(Argentina) Escobar (HOU) (United States) Tafari (DAL) (United States) Zimmerman (NSH) (Algeria) Farsi (CLB)	(Germany) Herbers (CHI) (Argentina) L. Acosta (CIN) (Scotland) Gauld (VAN)	(Gabon) Bouanga (LAFC) (Japan) **Kubo** (CIN) (Brazil) Pec (LA)	(Canada) Sirois (MTL) (France) Malanda (CLT) (Canada) Waterman (MTL) (Brazil) João Paulo (SEA) (United States) Bassett (COL) (Spain) Gil (NE) (Brazil) Afonso (MIA) (Serbia) Joveljić (LA) (Colombia) Hernández (CLB)	(United States) Frank Klopas (CHI)
21	(United States) Guzan (ATL)	(Argentina) Orellano (CIN) (United States) Ragen (SEA) (United States) Fray (MIA)	(Ghana) Blessing (HOU) (Argentina) L. Acosta (CIN) (United States) Mihailovic (COL) (Brazil) Evander (POR) (Colombia) A. Gómez (RSL)	(England) Surridge (NSH) (Croatia) **Musa** (DAL)	(United States) McCarthy (LA) (Spain) Palencia (LAFC) (United States) Gressel (MIA) (Argentina) Almada (ATL) (United States) Luna (RSL) (Uruguay) Torres (ORL) (Israel) Baribo (PHI) (Nigeria) Agada (SKC) (Serbia) Joveljić (LA)	(France) Peter Luccin (DAL)
22	(United States) Stajduhar (ORL)	(United States) Hollingshead (LAFC) (Ecuador) Arreaga (NE) (United States) D. Nealis (RBNY)	(Uruguay) Torres (ORL) (United States) Mihailovic (COL) (Slovakia) Rusnák (SEA) (Poland) Bogusz (LAFC)	(Colombia) **Hernández** (CLB) (Paraguay) Ferreira (HOU) (United States) J. Morris (SEA)	(Croatia) Kahlina (CLT) (United States) Zimmerman (NSH) (United States) A. Morris (CLB) (England) Harris (COL) (Brazil) Pec (LA) (Gabon) Bouanga (LAFC) (Chile) Rubio (ATX) (Albania) Vrioni (NE) (United States) Agyemang (CLT)	(United States) Caleb Porter (NE)
23	(United States) S. Clark (HOU)	(Argentina) Orellano (CIN) (France) Camacho (CLB) (Spain) Alba (MIA)	(Uruguay) Rossi (CLB) (Slovakia) Rusnák (SEA) (Spain) Puig (LA) (United States) Duke (MTL)	(Colombia) Hernández (CLB) (Poland) Bogusz (LAFC) (United States) **White** (VAN)	(United States) McCarthy (LA) (Jamaica) Gray (NYC) (United States) Fray (MIA) (Japan) Yamane (LA) (United States) Sands (NYC) (Brazil) Evander (POR) (Uruguay) S. Rodríguez (NYC) (Brazil) Pec (LA) (Germany) Leibold (SKC)	(Argentina) Gerardo Martino (MIA)
24	(Slovenia) Ivačič (NE)	(Spain) Palencia (LAFC) (United States) Tafari (DAL) (Uruguay) Laborda (VAN)	(Scotland) Gauld (VAN) (United States) Cremaschi (MIA) (Czech Republic) Bucha (CIN) (United States) Mihailovic (COL)	(Albania) Vrioni (NE) (Belgium) **Cuypers** (CHI) (Costa Rica) A. Martínez (NYC)	(Japan) Takaoka (VAN) (United States) Vassilev (STL) (United States) Gressel (MIA) (Argentina) Ojeda (ORL) (Switzerland) Haile-Selassie (CHI) (Austria) Wolf (NYC) (Gabon) Bouanga (LAFC) (Colombia) A. Gómez (RSL) (Uruguay) Rossi (CLB)	(United States) Steve Cherundolo (LAFC)
25	(Paraguay) Coronel (RBNY)	(Greece) Katranis (RSL) (Sweden) Jansson (ORL) (Algeria) Farsi (CLB)	(United States) Bassett (COL) (United States) **Luna** (RSL) (Argentina) L. Acosta (CIN) (Slovakia) Rusnák (SEA)	(Uruguay) J. Rodríguez (POR) (United States) Zardes (ATX) (Brazil) Pec (LA)	(Switzerland) Frei (SEA) (United States) M. Rodríguez (SKC) (Colombia) Angulo (ORL) (Colombia) Moreno (POR) (Argentina) Orellano (CIN) (Nigeria) Agada (SKC) (Uruguay) Rossi (CLB) (Colombia) Hernández (CLB) (Japan) Kubo (CIN)	(United States) Pat Noonan (CIN)
26	(Croatia) Kahlina (CLT)	(United States) Arfsten (CLB) (United States) Privett (CLT) (Brazil) Ruan (MTL)	(Uruguay) Torres (ORL) (England) **Westwood** (CLT) (Colombia) Moreno (POR) (Colombia) Dájome (DC)	(United States) Ramirez (CLB) (United States) White (VAN) (Colombia) Hernández (CLB)	(Switzerland) Frei (SEA) (United States) Campbell (MTL) (United States) Nagbe (CLB) (Serbia) Radoja (SKC) (Mexico) Vargas (SEA) (Brazil) Evander (POR) (Scotland) Gauld (VAN) (Canada) Kerr (TOR) (United States) Farrington (DAL)	(France) Wilfried Nancy (CLB)
27	(United States) Brady (CHI)	(Germany) Wagner (PHI) (Jamaica) Bell (SEA) (Colombia) Vera (RSL) (United States) Steres (HOU)	(United States) Arriola (DAL) (Argentina) Redondo (MIA) (Brazil) Pec (LA)	(Belgium) Benteke (DC) (Israel) **Baribo** (PHI) (Venezuela) J. Martínez (MTL)	(Croatia) Kahlina (CLT) (Norway) Glesnes (PHI) (United States) Gutiérrez (CHI) (Spain) Puig (LA) (Paraguay) D. Gómez (MIA) (Georgia (country)) Lobjanidze (ATL) (Brazil) Magno (NYC) (Argentina) Enrique (ORL) (Ghana) Paintsil (LA)	(United States) Greg Vanney (LA)
28	(Switzerland) Bürki (STL)	(Spain) Alba (MIA) (Norway) Gregersen (ATL) (United States) Dorsey (HOU)	(Canada) Laryea (TOR) (Hungary) **Gazdag** (PHI) (United States) Bassett (COL) (Cape Verde) Tavares (CLT)	(Gabon) Bouanga (LAFC) (Ghana) Paintsil (LA) (Scotland) Morgan (RBNY)	(France) Lloris (LAFC) (United States) Miller (NE) (Honduras) Rosales (MIN) (Italy) Bright (MIA) (Spain) Puig (LA) (Colombia) A. Gómez (RSL) (Georgia (country)) Lobjanidze (ATL) (Haiti) Picault (VAN) (Nigeria) Agada (SKC)	(United States) Steve Cherundolo (LAFC)
29	(United States) Stuver (ATX)	(France) Malanda (CLT) (Spain) Busquets (MIA) (Japan) Yoshida (LA)	(United States) Lletget (DAL) (Germany) Hartel (STL) (Brazil) Evander (POR) (Slovakia) Rusnák (SEA)	(Germany) Reus (LA) (Uruguay) **Suárez** (MIA) (Argentina) Langoni (NE)	(United States) Callender (MIA) (United States) Ragen (SEA) (United States) Davis (SKC) (Spain) Gil (NE) (Spain) Puig (LA) (Argentina) Espinoza (SJ) (United States) Wood (NE) (Italy) Yeboah (MIN) (Costa Rica) A. Martínez (NYC)	(United States) Ian Russell (SJ)
30	(Jamaica) Blake (PHI)	(Argentina) **Orellano** (CIN) (Spain) Busquets (MIA) (Colombia) Mosquera (POR)	(Uruguay) Rossi (CLB) (Trinidad and Tobago) Fortune (ATL) (Ecuador) Vite (VAN) (Uruguay) Torres (ORL)	(Brazil) Navarro (COL) (Uruguay) Suárez (MIA) (South Africa) Hlongwane (MIN)	(United States) Beavers (RSL) (Argentina) Escobar (HOU) (United States) Jones (CLB) (Germany) Hartel (STL) (Brazil) Evander (POR) (Scotland) Gauld (VAN) (Denmark) Uhre (PHI) (Senegal) Badji (DC) (Argentina) Ponce (HOU)	(England) Phil Neville (POR)
31	(United States) Maurer (DAL)	(United States) W. Sands (NE) (United States) Long (LAFC) (United States) Shelton (SKC)	(Slovakia) **Rusnák** (SEA) (Poland) Klich (DC) (Mexico) H. Herrera (HOU) (United States) C. Roldan (SEA)	(Belgium) Benteke (DC) (United States) J. Morris (SEA) (United States) Hall (RBNY)	(France) Lloris (LAFC) (United States) Blackmon (VAN) (United States) Gutman CHI) (United States) Atencio (SEA) (Spain) Gil (NE) (Argentina) Langoni (NE) (Germany) Hartel (STL) (United States) Becher (STL) (Mexico) Pulido (SKC)	(United States) Troy Lesesne (DC)
32	(United States) Freese (NYC)	(Brazil) Santos (ORL) (United States) Ragen (SEA) (United States) Dorsey (HOU)	(Scotland) Gauld (VAN) (Spain) Puig (LA) (United States) Mihailovic (COL) (United States) C. Clark (MTL)	(Uruguay) Suárez (MIA) (Serbia) Joveljić (LA) (Argentina) **Messi** (MIA)	(Canada) St. Clair (MIN) (United States) Neal (LA) (Spain) Alba (MIA) (Canada) Osorio (TOR) (Morocco) Bassi (HOU) (United States) Rothrock (SEA) (Germany) Mukhtar (NSH) (Uruguay) Torres (ORL) (Greece) Koutsias (CHI)	(United States) Greg Vanney (LA)
33	(United States) Rick (PHI)	(Portugal) Amador (ATL) (Norway) Glesnes (PHI) (Argentina) Andrés Herrera (CLB)	(Brazil) **Evander** (POR) (Germany) Thommy (SKC) (Japan) Kubo (CIN) (Uruguay) Torres (ORL)	(Ecuador) Julio (RSL) (Mexico) Pulido (SKC) (United States) J. Morris (SEA)	(United States) Stuver (ATX) (Serbia) Veselinović (VAN) (Canada) Saliba (MTL) (Spain) Gil (NE) (Russia) Miranchuk (ATL) (Venezuela) D. Martínez (LAFC) (Uruguay) J. Rodríguez (POR) (Colombia) Hernández (CLB) (Israel) Baribo (PHI)	(England) Phil Neville (POR)
34	(United States) Guzan (ATL)	(United States) Arfsten (CLB) (United States) Cannon (COL) (Argentina) Orellano (CIN)	(United States) Q. Sullivan (PHI) (Panama) Carrasquilla (HOU) (United States) Sands (NYC) (Brazil) **Pec** (LA)	(United States) Agyemang (CLT) (England) Surridge (NSH) (United States) Farrington (DAL)	(United States) S. Clark (HOU) (United States) Tolkin (RBNY) (Finland) Lod (MIN) (United States) C. Clark (MTL) (Spain) Puig (LA) (United States) Luna (RSL) (Hungary) Gazdag (PHI) (Spain) Biel (CLT) (Colombia) Hernández (CLB)	(United States) Chris Armas (COL)
35	(Slovenia) Ivačič (NE)	(Argentina) Schlegel (ORL) (Colombia) Y. Gómez (SEA) (Jamaica) Gray (NYC)	(Germany) Teuchert (STL) (Argentina) Moralez (NYC) (England) O'Brien (LAFC) (Argentina) Enrique (ORL)	(Venezuela) J. Martínez (MTL) (Costa Rica) **A. Martínez** (NYC) (Italy) Yeboah (MIN)	(Croatia) Kahlina (CLT) (United States) C. Clark (MTL) (Gabon) Bouanga (LAFC) (Argentina) Messi (MIA) (Belgium) Benteke (DC) (Colombia) Hernández (CLB) (United States) Bye (NE)	(United States) Nick Cushing (NYC)
36	(United States) Stuver (ATX)	(United States) Tolkin (RBNY) (Denmark) Sviatchenko (HOU) (Slovenia) Ilenič (NYC)	(Spain) Puig (LA) (Argentina) López (SJ) (Brazil) Pirani (DC) (Slovakia) Rusnák (SEA)	(Argentina) **Messi** (MIA) (Venezuela) J. Martínez (MTL) (Poland) Świderski (CLT)	(Canada) St. Clair (MIN) (Panama) Carrasquilla (HOU) (Uruguay) S. Rodríguez (NYC) (Germany) Mukhtar (NSH) (Spain) Biel (CLT) (Scotland) Morgan (RBNY) (Gabon) Bouanga (LAFC) (Brazil) Pec (LA) (Colombia) Muriel (ORL)	(Argentina) Gerardo Martino (MIA)
37	(Argentina) Ustari (MIA)	(Portugal) Santos (DC) (United States) Long (LAFC) (Algeria) Farsi (CLB)	(Germany) Hartel (STL) (Spain) Puig (LA) (Russia) Miranchuk (ATL) (Uruguay) S. Rodríguez (NYC)	(Argentina) Enrique (ORL) (Colombia) **Hernández** (CLB) (United States) Becher (STL)	(United States) Maurer (DAL) (United States) Harriel (PHI) (Colombia) Angulo (ORL) (United States) Luna (RSL) (Ecuador) Campana (MIA) (Gabon) Bouanga (LAFC) (France) Chambost (CLB) (Belgium) Benteke (DC) (Mexico) Vargas (SEA)	(Colombia) Óscar Pareja (ORL)
38	(United States) Guzan (ATL)	(Denmark) Amundsen (CLB) (United States) Steres (HOU) (Brazil) Marlon (LAFC)	(United States) C. Clark (MTL) (United States) Bronico (CLT) (Colombia) Atuesta (LAFC) (United States) Luna (RSL)	(South Korea) Jeong (MIN) (Uruguay) Suárez (MIA) (Argentina) **Messi** (MIA)	(United States) Panicco (NSH) (Colombia) Y. Gómez (SEA) (Spain) Alba (MIA) (Slovenia) Kolmanič (ATX) (Sweden) Forsberg (RBNY) (United States) Jackson (CLB) (Georgia (country)) Lobjanidze (ATL) (Brazil) Antony (POR) (England) Surridge (NSH)	(United States) Rob Valentino (ATL)

=== Goal of the Matchday ===
Goal of the Matchday
Matchday	Player	Club	Ref.
1+2	(Poland) Mateusz Bogusz	Los Angeles FC	
3	(Italy) Lorenzo Insigne	Toronto FC	
4	(Italy) Lorenzo Insigne	Toronto FC	
5	(Sweden) Joakim Nilsson	St. Louis City SC	
6	(England) Ashley Westwood	Charlotte FC	
7	(Panama) Aníbal Godoy	Nashville SC	
8	(Peru) Raúl Ruidíaz	Seattle Sounders FC	
9	(Argentina) Lionel Messi	Inter Miami CF	
10	(Brazil) Célio Pompeu	St. Louis City SC	
11	(Greece) Alexandros Katranis	Real Salt Lake	
12	(Paraguay) Matías Rojas	Inter Miami CF	
13	(Paraguay) Matías Rojas	Inter Miami CF	
14	(England) Ashley Westwood	Charlotte FC	
15	(Ecuador) Leonardo Campana	Inter Miami CF	
16	(Ecuador) Anderson Julio	Real Salt Lake	
17	(Argentina) Lionel Messi	Inter Miami CF	
18	(United States) Chris Durkin	St. Louis City SC	
19	Not awarded		
20	(Scotland) Ryan Gauld	Vancouver Whitecaps FC	
21	(Argentina) Luca Orellano	FC Cincinnati	
22	(United States) Patrick Agyemang	Charlotte FC	
23	(United States) Max Arfsten	Columbus Crew	
24	(United States) Diego Luna	Real Salt Lake	
25	(Argentina) Luciano Acosta	FC Cincinnati	
26	(Colombia) Cucho Hernández	Columbus Crew	
27	(United States) Quinn Sullivan	Philadelphia Union	
28	(Poland) Mateusz Bogusz	Los Angeles FC	
29	(Brazil) Evander	Portland Timbers	
30	(Argentina) Luca Orellano	FC Cincinnati	
31	(United States) Simon Becher	St. Louis City SC	
32	(Argentina) Lionel Messi	Inter Miami CF	
33	(Russia) Alexey Miranchuk	Atlanta United FC	
34	(Brazil) Evander	Portland Timbers	
35	(Argentina) Lionel Messi	Inter Miami CF	
36	(Argentina) Lionel Messi	Inter Miami CF	
37	(Ecuador) Leonardo Campana	Inter Miami CF	

=== Player of the Month ===
Month	Player	Club	Stats	Ref.
February/March	(Uruguay) Luis Suárez	Inter Miami CF	7 matches played, 5 goals, 3 assists	
April	(Argentina) Lionel Messi	Inter Miami CF	4 matches played, 6 goals, 4 assists	
May	(Argentina) Luciano Acosta	FC Cincinnati	6 matches played, 3 goals, 5 assists	
June	(Poland) Mateusz Bogusz	Los Angeles FC	5 matches played, 6 goals, 3 assists	
July	(Colombia) Cucho Hernández	Columbus Crew	5 matches played, 3 goals, 4 assists	
August/September	(Brazil) Evander	Portland Timbers	6 matches played, 4 goals, 5 assists	
October	(Argentina) Lionel Messi	Inter Miami CF	3 matches played, 5 goals, 1 assist	

=== End-of-season awards ===
Award	Winner (club)	Ref.
Most Valuable Player	Lionel Messi (Inter Miami CF)	
Defender of the Year	Steven Moreira (Columbus Crew)	
Goalkeeper of the Year	Kristijan Kahlina (Charlotte FC)	
Coach of the Year	Wilfried Nancy (Columbus Crew)	
Young Player of the Year	Diego Luna (Real Salt Lake)	
Newcomer of the Year	Gabriel Pec (LA Galaxy)	
Comeback Player of the Year	Lewis Morgan (New York Red Bulls)	
Golden Boot	Christian Benteke (D.C. United)	
Audi Goals Drive Progress Impact Award	Darlington Nagbe (Columbus Crew)	
Referee of the Year	Drew Fischer	
Assistant Referee of the Year	Kyle Atkins	
Goal of the Year	Luca Orellano (FC Cincinnati)	
Save of the Year	Maarten Paes (FC Dallas)	

=== MLS Best XI ===
Goalkeeper	Defenders	Midfielders	Forwards	Ref.
(Croatia) Kristijan Kahlina, Charlotte	(Spain) Jordi Alba, Miami (Colombia) Yeimar Gómez Andrade, Seattle (Cape Verde) Steven Moreira, Columbus	(Argentina) Luciano Acosta, Cincinnati (Brazil) Evander, Portland (Spain) Riqui Puig, LA Galaxy	(Belgium) Christian Benteke, DC (Gabon) Denis Bouanga, LAFC (Colombia) Cucho Hernández, Columbus (Argentina) Lionel Messi, Miami	

== See also ==
- 2024 MLS referee lockout
- 2024 Leagues Cup
