= Ian Murphy (soccer) =

American soccer player (born 2000)

- Murphy with San Diego FC in 2026

Personal information
- Full name: Ian Murphy
- Date of birth: January 16, 2000 (age 26)
- Place of birth: Redlands, California, U.S.
- Height: 6 ft 2 in (1.88 m)
- Position: Defender

Team information
- Current team: San Diego FC
- Number: 32

Youth career
- –2018: FC Golden State

College career
Years	Team	Apps	(Gls)
2018–2021	Duke Blue Devils	69	(3)

Senior career*
Years	Team	Apps	(Gls)
2022–2024	FC Cincinnati	80	(1)
2022–2023	FC Cincinnati 2	5	(0)
2025–2026	Colorado Rapids	14	(0)
2026	Colorado Rapids 2	1	(0)
2026–	San Diego FC	0	(0)

International career
2014	United States U14		
2015	United States U15		
2016	United States U17		
- * Club domestic league appearances and goals as of 07:30, June 28, 2026 (CDT)

Ian Murphy (born January 16, 2000) is an American professional soccer player who plays as a defender for Major League Soccer club San Diego FC.

== Club career ==
=== Youth ===
Murphy played club soccer as part of the FC Golden State academy, helping the team to the finals of the Dallas Cup in 2014–15, and a first-place finish in the Southwest Division of the Western Conference in 2016–17.

=== College ===
In 2018, Murphy attended Duke University to play college soccer. During his time at Duke, Murphy made 69 appearances for the Blue Devils, scoring three goals and tallying seven assists. He was named to the ACC Academic Honor Roll on three consecutive occasions, was Duke's Defender of the Year in 2021, and was Third Team All-South Region in his senior season.

=== Professional ===
On January 11, 2022, Murphy was selected 14th overall in the 2022 MLS SuperDraft by FC Cincinnati. He officially signed with the Major League Soccer club on February 23, 2022. He made his professional debut on March 5, 2022, appearing as a 75th-minute substitute during a 0–1 loss to D.C. United. On December 9, 2024, Murphy was traded to Colorado Rapids alongside Chidozie Awaziem in exchange for $1 million in General Allocation Money.

== International career ==
In January 2024 he was selected for the senior United States squad for a match against Slovenia.

== Career statistics ==
=== Club ===
As of match played July 26, 2025

Appearances and goals by club, season and competition
Club	Season	League			National cup		Continental		Other		Total	
Club	Season	Division	Apps	Goals	Apps	Goals	Apps	Goals	Apps	Goals	Apps	Goals
FC Cincinnati	2022	MLS	26	1	2	0	—		3 (Note: One appearance in Leagues Cup Showcase, two appearances in MLS Cup Playoffs)	0	31	1
FC Cincinnati	2023	MLS	23	0	5	0	—		7 (Note: Three appearances in Leagues Cup, four appearances in MLS Cup Playoffs)	0	35	0
FC Cincinnati	2024	MLS	31	0	—		4 (Note: Appearances in CONCACAF Champions Cup)	0	4 (Note: Appearances in Leagues Cup)	0	39	0
FC Cincinnati	Total		80	1	7	0	4	0	14	0	105	1
FC Cincinnati 2 (loan)	2022	MLS Next Pro	4	0	—		—		—		4	0
FC Cincinnati 2 (loan)	2023	MLSNP	1	0	—		—		—		1	0
FC Cincinnati 2 (loan)	Total		5	0	—		—		—		5	0
Colorado Rapids	2025	MLS	14	0	—		2	0	—		16	0
Career total			99	1	7	0	6	0	14	0	126	1

== Honors ==
FC Cincinnati

- Supporters' Shield: 2023
