= Yūya Kubo (footballer) =

Japanese footballer (born 1993)

Yūya Kubo 久保 裕也
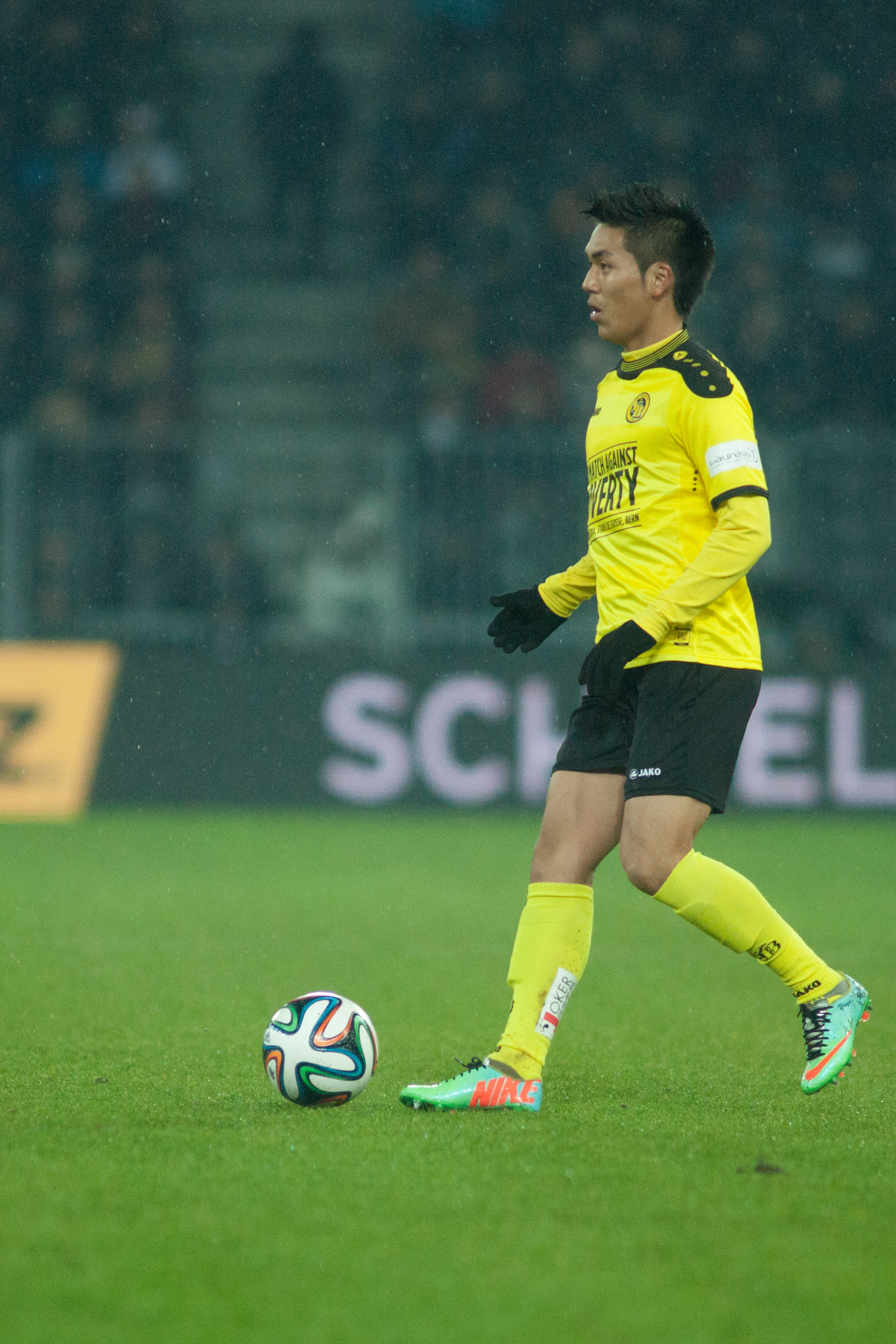
- Kubo playing for Young Boys in 2014

Personal information
- Full name: Yūya Kubo
- Date of birth: 24 December 1993 (age 32)
- Place of birth: Yamaguchi City, Japan
- Height: 1.78 m (5 ft 10 in)
- Positions: Midfielder; forward

Youth career
- FC Yamaguchi
- 2006–2008: Konan Junior High School
- 2009–2011: Kyoto Sanga

Senior career*
Years	Team	Apps	(Gls)
2011–2013	Kyoto Sanga	66	(18)
2013–2017	Young Boys	104	(26)
2017–2020	Gent	62	(22)
2018–2019	→ 1. FC Nürnberg (loan)	22	(1)
2020–2025	FC Cincinnati	146	(15)

International career^{‡}
2009–2010	Japan U-16	2	(2)
2010–2011	Japan U-17	7	(3)
2011–2012	Japan U-18	6	(11)
2012	Japan U-19	12	(4)
2014	Japan U-21	2	(0)
2015	Japan U-22	2	(1)
2016	Japan U-23	8	(3)
2016–2018	Japan	13	(2)
Medal record
Kyoto Sanga FC
Runner-up	Emperor's Cup	2011
Representing Japan
AFC U-23 Championship
Gold medal – first place	2016 Qatar
- * Club domestic league appearances and goals as of 04:32, 20 October 2025 (UTC) ‡ National team caps and goals as of 02:19, 16 June 2025 (UTC)

Yūya Kubo (久保 裕也, Kubo Yūya; born 24 December 1993) is a Japanese former professional footballer who plays as a forward or midfielder.

== Early life and youth ==
Born into a family of martial artists, Kubo began playing soccer at the age of five and initially started playing as a defender in elementary school, switching to forward in junior high school. In his second year, he was recruited by Kyoto Sanga to join their youth academy. In his third year of junior high, he participated in the National Junior High School Soccer Tournament and represented Yamaguchi Prefecture in the National Sports Festival.

== Club career ==
=== Kyoto Sanga ===
In 2009, at the age of fifteen, he joined the U-18 team of Kyoto Sanga and at 16 he was temporarily registered with the first team before returning to the youth squad for the J.League Youth Championship, leading the "Golden Generation" of Kyoto Sanga Youth to the semifinals. In 2011, he was officially promoted to the first team. and made his J2 League debut, scoring in his first start. By the end of the season, he had scored 10 goals in 30 league matches, becoming the team’s top scorer at just 17 years old. On 29 December, in the Emperor’s Cup semi-final against Yokohama F. Marinos, Kubo came off the bench and scored a crucial goal in extra time to break the 2–2 deadlock. He would also provide an assist in the game, helping to secure his team’s spot in the final with a 4–2 victory. He scored in the final against FC Tokyo, coming off the bench as he did in the semi-final. His goal was in vain this time however, as FC Tokyo won the match 4–2.

During the 2013 season, he scored his first professional hat-trick.

=== BSC Young Boys ===
==== 2013–14 ====
On 18 June 2013, Kyoto Sanga announced Kubo's transfer to Swiss club BSC Young Boys. He made his Swiss Super League debut on 13 July playing 15 minutes in a 2–0 win against FC Sion at the season opener. In his third match on 28 July, he scored two goals and made one assist coming off the bench against FC Thun in a 3–2 win, and continued to impress with another goal in the fourth match. Although he started only five matches in his first season in Switzerland, he played in 34 league games, scoring seven goals and providing five assists, helping Young Boys finish third and qualify for the UEFA Europa League.

==== 2014–15 ====
Kubo started the domestic season strong with goals in the opening two matches while playing as an attacking midfielder, but struggled to maintain a starting spot as his coach wanted him to focus more on playmaking rather than scoring. He expressed frustration post-match after coming on as a substitute in matchday 28, stating, "This style of play takes away my strengths. Moving forward, I want to balance team play while still showing my abilities." Given a starting appearance in the following game, Kubo scored the opening goal versus Grasshopper. By season’s end, he had played 27 league matches and started 14, scoring five goals. During the 2014–15 Europa League, Kubo helped Young Boys reach the group stage. He debuted in the group stage with an assist in their opening match against Slovan Bratislava and continued impressing, assisting against Napoli and scoring a crucial brace in the return fixture against Slovan Bratislava, making him the second Japanese player to score twice in a Europa League match after Shinji Okazaki. His team was eliminated in the following round by Everton.

==== 2015–16 ====
In the 2015–16 Champions League season, his team was eliminated in the qualifying round by AS Monaco and dropped into the Europa League playoffs, where they were eliminated by Qarabağ FK. Domestically, Kubo had a strong start, scoring two goals in the first round of the Swiss Cup against SC Kriens. He then scored one goal in each of the following three league matches. On 20 April, he scored a brace versus FC Luzern. Although he missed the latter part of the season due to injury, he recorded nine goals and six assists in 29 league appearances, the highest tally since his move. His contributions helped Young Boys finish second again, and he extended his contract until 2020.

==== 2016–17 ====
During the start of the 2016–17 season, Kubo was about to depart for Brazil with his national team for the Olympics, but was recalled by Young Boys due to injuries in the squad. He scored in the first game of the season on 23 July versus St. Gallen, and played a key role in Young Boys' Champions League qualifying win against Shakhtar Donetsk, scoring twice. Kubo scored in all three Swiss Cup matches that he appeared in, including netting a hat-trick on 18 September. He also scored in three straight league games for the second time for his club.

=== KAA Gent ===
On 25 January 2017, Kubo was acquired by Belgian club KAA Gent for a transfer fee of €3.5 million. He had an immediate impact for his new club, scoring a free-kick goal from 27 yards out in his first game. He finished the regular season by scoring five goals in the seven remaining games. His hot form continued into the playoffs, starting all 10 games while scoring six times, ending his season scoring 23 goals across all competitions for both clubs.

In August 2018, Kubo joined Bundesliga side 1. FC Nürnberg on loan for the 2018–19 season. While his Gent contract was also extended, Nürnberg secured an option to sign him permanently.

=== FC Cincinnati ===
On 9 January 2020, Kubo joined MLS side FC Cincinnati as a designated player. Signed as an attacking player, he made his FC Cincinnati debut against the New York Red Bulls, on 1 March 2020 and scored his first goal for his new club in the following match. At the beginning of the 2021 season, Kubo transitioned to become a more versatile position player, tasked with assuming the role of a defensive midfielder. On 16 June 2024, after returning from a month-long injury layoff, Kubo scored a hat-trick in nine minutes after coming on as a second-half substitute. He finished with 11 goals across all competition in 2024, his highest tally since joining FC Cincinnati, and on 15 July surpassed teammate and Cincinnati-native Nick Hagglund as the club's all-time leader in appearances, a record that would stand until 2026. On 26 November 2025, the team announced that they had declined Kubo's contract option.

== International career ==
Kubo has been involved in the Japan National Team from U-16 to U-23 level. He received his first call up to the senior team for the Kirin Challenge Cup, a friendly match against Iceland in February 2012, however he did not feature during the 90 minutes. On 11 November 2016, he made his full international debut for Japan against Oman in the Kirin Challenge Cup 2016. On 23 March 2017, he scored one goal and gave one assist in 0–2 win over UAE in 2018 FIFA World Cup qualification. It was his first goal in his third game for Japan. On 28 March 2017, he scored one goal and added two assists in a 4–0 victory over Thailand in 2018 FIFA World Cup qualification.

== Style of play ==
A versatile player, Kubo has been deployed as a forward, namely as a second striker, but has also appeared as a defensive midfielder and as a winger. Described as very comfortable on the ball, Kubo has also been known for his work rate and ability to manoeuvre though tight spaces.

== Career statistics ==
=== Club ===
As of match played 23 November 2025.

Club	Season	League			National cup (Note: Includes Emperor's Cup, Swiss Cup, Belgian Cup, DFB-Pokal, and U.S. Open Cup)		League cup (Note: Includes Leagues Cup)		Continental		Other (Note: Includes MLS Cup playoffs)		Total	
Club	Season	Division	Apps	Goals	Apps	Goals	Apps	Goals	Apps	Goals	Apps	Goals	Apps	Goals
Kyoto Sanga	2011	J2 League	30	10	3	2	–		–		–		33	12
Kyoto Sanga	2012	J2 League	20	1	–		–		–		–		20	1
Kyoto Sanga	2013	J2 League	16	7	–		–		–		–		16	7
Kyoto Sanga	Total		66	18	3	2	–		–		–		69	20
Young Boys	2013–14	Swiss Super League	34	7	2	1	–		–		–		36	8
Young Boys	2014–15	Swiss Super League	27	5	1	0	–		10 (Note: Appearances in UEFA Europa League)	2	–		38	7
Young Boys	2015–16	Swiss Super League	29	9	2	0	–		4 (Note: Two appearances in UEFA Europa League and two appearances in UEFA Champions League)	0	–		35	9
Young Boys	2016–17	Swiss Super League	14	5	2	4	–		8 (Note: Four appearances in UEFA Europa League, four appearances and two goals in UEFA Champions League)	2	–		24	11
Young Boys	Total		104	26	7	5	–		22	4	–		133	35
Gent	2016–17	Belgian Pro League	17	11	–		–		–		–		17	11
Gent	2017–18	Belgian Pro League	37	11	3	0	–		2	0	–		42	11
Gent	2018–19	Belgian Pro League	2	0	–		–		–		–		2	0
Gent	2019–20	Belgian Pro League	6	0	1	1	–		5	2	–		12	3
Gent	Total		62	22	4	1	–		7	2	–		73	25
1. FC Nürnberg (loan)	2018–19	Bundesliga	22	1	1	0	–		–		–		23	1
FC Cincinnati	2020	Major League Soccer	19	3	–		–		–		1 (Note: Appearance in the MLS is Back Tournament Ro16)	0	20	3
FC Cincinnati	2021	Major League Soccer	29	0	–		–		–		–		29	0
FC Cincinnati	2022	Major League Soccer	27	1	1	0	1 (Note: Appearance in the 2022 Leagues Cup Showcase)	1	–		1	0	31	2
FC Cincinnati	2023	Major League Soccer	25	0	5	2	3	0	–		4	0	37	2
FC Cincinnati	2024	Major League Soccer	32	10	–		4	1	3 (Note: Appearances in CONCACAF Champions Cup)	0	3	0	42	11
FC Cincinnati	2025	Major League Soccer	14	1	–		–		4	0	3	0	21	1
FC Cincinnati	Total		146	15	6	2	8	2	7	0	12	0	179	19
Career total			400	82	21	10	8	2	36	6	12	0	477	100

=== International ===
Japan national team
Year	Apps	Goals
2016	2	0
2017	9	2
2018	2	0
Total	13	2

=== International goals ===
Scores and results list Japan's goal tally first.

No	Date	Venue	Opponent	Score	Result	Competition
1.	23 March 2017	Hazza Bin Zayed Stadium, Al Ain, United Arab Emirates	United Arab Emirates	1–0	2–0	2018 FIFA World Cup qualification
2.	28 March 2017	Saitama Stadium, Saitama, Japan	Thailand	3–0	4–0	2018 FIFA World Cup qualification

== Honours ==
Kyoto Sanga FC

- Emperor's Cup Runner-up : 2011

Japan U-23

- AFC U-23 Championship Champions: 2016

FC Cincinnati

- Supporters' Shield Winner: 2023, Runner-up: 2025
