= Luca Orellano =

Argentine footballer (born 2000)

Personal information
- Full name: Luca Nicolás Orellano
- Date of birth: 22 March 2000 (age 26)
- Place of birth: Francisco Álvarez, Argentina
- Height: 1.73 m (5 ft 8 in)
- Position: Winger

Team information
- Current team: Monterrey
- Number: 11

Youth career
- 2009–2018: Vélez Sarsfield

Senior career*
| Years | Team | Apps | (Gls) |
| 2018–2022 | Vélez Sarsfield | 89 | (9) |
| 2023–2024 | Vasco da Gama | 24 | (2) |
| 2024 | → FC Cincinnati (loan) | 33 | (10) |
| 2025 | FC Cincinnati | 27 | (2) |
| 2026– | Monterrey | 14 | (3) |
- * Club domestic league appearances and goals as of 01:42, 20 June 2026 (UTC)

Luca Nicolás Orellano (born 22 March 2000) is an Argentine professional footballer who plays as a winger for Liga MX club Monterrey.

== Career ==
=== Vélez Sarsfield ===
Orellano started his youth career in 2009 with Vélez Sarsfield of the Primera División. He was moved into Gabriel Heinze's first-team during the 2018–19 season. This made his professional debut on 25 November 2018 in an away win against Unión Santa Fe. He was substituted on for Jonathan Ramis with minutes remaining.

=== Vasco da Gama ===
On 13 January 2023, Vasco da Gama announced Orellano's transfer from Vélez Sarsfield for US$4m. He signed with the Brazilian club until 31 December 2025.

=== FC Cincinnati ===
On 23 February 2024, FC Cincinnati announced Orellano's transfer via loan from Vasco da Gama for the 2024 season with an option to purchase. After being named a finalist for the 2024 MLS Newcomer of the Year Award, winning the 2024 MLS Goal of the Year Award, and being selected to represent the league at the 2024 MLS All-Star Game, Orellano was officially purchased by FC Cincinnati on 2 December 2024.

=== Monterrey ===
In January 2026, Orellano joined Mexican club Monterrey.

== Career statistics ==
As of match played on 23 November 2025.

| Club | Season | League | | | State league (Note: Includes Campeonato Carioca) | | National cup (Note: Includes Copa Argentina and Copa do Brasil) | | League cup (Note: Includes Copa de la Superliga and Leagues Cup) | | Continental | | Other (Note: Includes MLS Cup playoffs) | | Total | |
| Club | Season | Division | Apps | Goals | Apps | Goals | Apps | Goals | Apps | Goals | Apps | Goals | Apps | Goals | Apps | Goals |
|---|---|---|---|---|---|---|---|---|---|---|---|---|---|---|---|---|
| Vélez Sarsfield | 2018–19 | Primera División | 1 | 0 | — | | — | | — | | — | | — | | 1 | 0 |
| Vélez Sarsfield | 2019–20 | Primera División | 4 | 0 | — | | — | | 1 | 0 | — | | — | | 5 | 0 |
| Vélez Sarsfield | 2020–21 | Primera División | 12 | 2 | — | | 2 | 0 | — | | 9 (Note: Four appearances and one goal in Copa Libertadores, five appearances and one goal in Copa Sudamericana) | 2 | — | | 23 | 4 |
| Vélez Sarsfield | 2021 | Primera División | 37 | 4 | — | | — | | — | | 2 (Note: Appearances in Copa Libertadores) | 0 | — | | 39 | 4 |
| Vélez Sarsfield | 2022 | Primera División | 35 | 3 | — | | 3 | 1 | — | | 12 | 0 | — | | 50 | 4 |
| Vélez Sarsfield | Total | | 89 | 9 | — | | 5 | 1 | 1 | 0 | 23 | 2 | — | | 118 | 12 |
| Vasco da Gama | 2023 | Série A | 18 | 1 | 6 | 1 | 1 | 0 | — | | — | | — | | 25 | 2 |
| FC Cincinnati (loan) | 2024 | MLS | 33 | 10 | — | | — | | 4 | 1 | 2 (Note: Appearances in CONCACAF Champions Cup) | 0 | 3 | 1 | 42 | 12 |
| FC Cincinnati | 2025 | MLS | 27 | 2 | — | | — | | 3 | 1 | 2 | 0 | 3 | 0 | 35 | 3 |
| Career total | | | 167 | 22 | 6 | 1 | 6 | 1 | 8 | 2 | 27 | 2 | 6 | 1 | 230 | 29 |

== Honours ==
Individual

- MLS All-Star: 2024
- MLS Goal of the Year: 2024
