= 2023 FC Cincinnati season =

FC Cincinnati
2023 season
- General manager: Chris Albright
- Head coach: Pat Noonan
- Stadium: TQL Stadium
- MLS: Conference: 1st Overall: 1st
- MLS Cup Playoffs: Conference Finals
- U.S. Open Cup: Semifinals
- Leagues Cup: Round of 16
- Top goalscorer: League: Luciano Acosta (17); All: Acosta (21)
- Highest home attendance: League/All: 25,513 (17 times)
- Lowest home attendance: League: 23,461 (5/17 v. CFM); All: 10,062 (4/26 v. LOU, USOC)
- Average home league attendance: 25,367
- Biggest win: CIN 6–0
- Biggest defeat: STL 5–1 CIN (4/15)
Home colors	Away colors

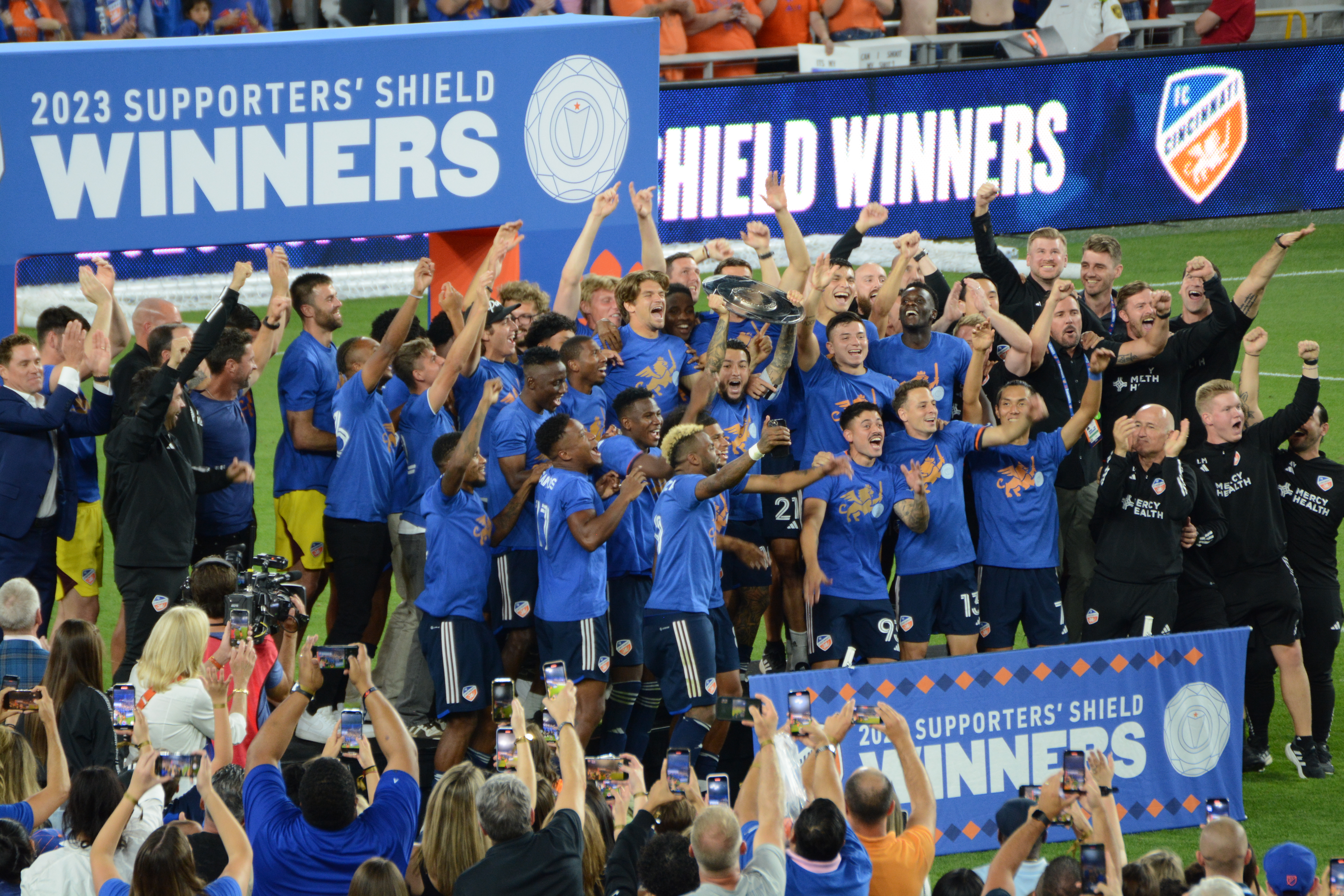
Players and staff celebrate after clinching the Supporters' Shield.

The 2023 FC Cincinnati season was the club's fifth season in MLS, and the eighth season overall for the team including their first three years in the lower-division USL Championship. The club entered 2023 on a high note, having notched their first playoff appearance and first playoff win in 2022 after languishing at the bottom of the standings for their first three seasons in MLS. On September 30, FC Cincinnati clinched the Supporters' Shield, the award given to the team that finishes with the most points in the regular season.

FC Cincinnati home matches were played at TQL Stadium. 2023 was the second season with the club for general manager Chris Albright and head coach Pat Noonan.

== Summary ==
The Orange and Blue started the regular season with 5 wins, 2 draws, and no losses. They reached 1st place on the Supporters' Shield standings on Matchday 7, and were the last remaining undefeated team in the Eastern Conference until their loss at St. Louis City SC on Matchday 8. After a 3–0 victory on Matchday 12 at TQL Stadium against CF Montreal, the club became only the 4th team since 2000 to start the MLS season with seven straight wins (7–0–0) at home.

FC Cincinnati won the first Hell is Real match of 2023 on May 20, with a scoreline of 3–2; it was the first win against rival Columbus Crew since October 2020. The result also extended the club's home winning streak to eight matches in league play and ten overall. By the end of the month, FC Cincinnati had set the record for most points (36) through the first 15 games of a season in MLS history, excluding the shootout era. The home winning streak was extended to ten MLS matches in June, tying a record set in 2002 by the San Jose Earthquakes.

With a 1–0 victory over Chicago Fire FC, FC Cincinnati made history and became the first club to reach 39 points in their first 16 matches of a season (excluding shootout era). After a 3–0 victory over Toronto FC, FC Cincinnati became the fourth team in MLS history to win 10 consecutive home matches, tying the 2002 San Jose Earthquakes for longest single-season home winning streak. After a 2–1 win on the road at New York Red Bulls, the club became just the third team in MLS history to win 11 of their first 22 matches by a one-goal margin – excluding the shootout era. With a 3–1 win at home against Nashville SC, the club tied Los Angeles FC (2019 and 2022) for the fastest team in MLS history to reach 50 points in a season, doing so in just 23 matches. With a 3–0 win against New York City FC, the club reached 37 points in their first 13 regular season games at TQL Stadium, tying the 2002 San Jose Earthquakes for the best home start to a season in league history through the first 13 games.

After a come from behind 2–1 victory at Atlanta United FC, FC Cincinnati became the first team to clinch a 2023 playoff berth. They also became the second fastest club in MLS history to secure their playoff position in only 26 matches.

=== MLS All-Stars ===
Three players were named to the 2023 MLS All-Star roster, Luciano Acosta was selected for the 2nd time, and Álvaro Barreal and Matt Miazga both with their first selection. The game was played on July 19, 2023, against Arsenal FC of the English Premier League at Audi Field, home of D.C. United. Acosta was also chosen by an online fan vote to serve as team captain for the MLS All-Stars and was included as part of the All-Star Skills Challenge. All 3 players played 45 minutes, with Acosta and Barreal (yellow card – 18') named to the starting lineup and subbing off at halftime. Miazga was inserted into the lineup at the start of the second half, playing the remainder of the match.

== Club ==
=== Roster ===
As of July 13, 2023

No.	Name	Nationality	Position	Date of birth (age)	Previous club
1	Alec Kann	United States	GK	August 8, 1990 (age 36)	(United States) Atlanta United FC
18	Roman Celentano (GA)	United States	GK	September 14, 2000 (age 26)	(United States) Indiana Hoosiers
25	Paul Walters (HG)	United States	GK	April 11, 2004 (age 22)	(United States) FC Cincinnati Academy
36	Evan Louro	United States	GK	January 19, 1996 (age 30)	(United States) Tampa Bay Rowdies
2	Alvas Powell	Jamaica	DF	July 18, 1994 (age 32)	(United States) Philadelphia Union
3	Joey Akpunonu (GA)	United States	DF	December 21, 2001 (age 24)	(United States) Bowling Green Falcons
4	Nick Hagglund	United States	DF	September 14, 1992 (age 34)	(Canada) Toronto FC
13	Santiago Arias (INTL)	Colombia	DF	January 13, 1992 (age 34)	(Spain) Granada CF
14	Yerson Mosquera (INTL)	Colombia	DF	May 2, 2001 (age 25)	(England) Wolverhampton Wanderers F.C.
21	Matt Miazga	United States	DF	July 19, 1995 (age 31)	(England) Chelsea F.C.
28	Ray Gaddis	United States	DF	January 13, 1990 (age 36)	(United States) Philadelphia Union
32	Ian Murphy	United States	DF	January 16, 2000 (age 26)	(United States) Duke Blue Devils
33	Isaiah Foster	United States	DF	August 12, 2003 (age 23)	(United States) Colorado Springs Switchbacks
37	Stiven Jimenez (HG)	United States	DF	June 24, 2007 (age 19)	(United States) FC Cincinnati Academy
42	Bret Halsey	United States	DF	June 1, 2000 (age 26)	(United States) Colorado Springs Switchbacks
34	London Aghedo	United States	DF	May 31, 2000 (age 26)	(United States) Air Force Falcons
5	Obinna Nwobodo (INTL, DP)	Nigeria	MF	November 29, 1996 (age 29)	(Turkey) Göztepe S.K.
8	Marco Angulo (INTL)	Ecuador	MF	May 8, 2002 (age 24)	(Ecuador) Independiente del Valle
10	Luciano Acosta (DP)	Argentina	MF	May 31, 1994 (age 32)	(Mexico) Atlas
26	Malik Pinto	United States	MF	August 9, 2002 (age 24)	(United States) FC Cincinnati Academy
31	Álvaro Barreal	Argentina	MF	August 17, 2000 (age 26)	(Argentina) Club Atlético Vélez Sarsfield
44	Ben Stitz	United States	MF	May 12, 2000 (age 26)	(United States) FC Cincinnati Academy
58	Gerardo Valenzuela (HG)	United States	MF	September 28, 2004 (age 22)	(United States) FC Cincinnati Academy
93	Júnior Moreno	Venezuela	MF	July 20, 1993 (age 33)	(United States) D.C. United
7	Yuya Kubo	Japan	FW	December 23, 1993 (age 32)	(Belgium) K.A.A. Gent
9	Aaron Boupendza (INTL, DP)	Gabon	FW	August 7, 1996 (age 30)	(Saudi Arabia) Al Shabab FC (Riyadh)
14	Dominique Badji	Senegal	FW	October 16, 1992 (age 34)	(United States) Colorado Rapids
17	Sérgio Santos	Brazil	FW	September 4, 1994 (age 32)	(United States) Philadelphia Union
19	Brandon Vazquez	United States	FW	October 14, 1998 (age 28)	(United States) Atlanta United FC
29	Arquimides Ordóñez (HG)	United States	FW	August 5, 2003 (age 23)	(United States) FC Cincinnati Academy

== Player movement ==
=== In ===
Date	No.	Pos	Player	Transferred from	Fee/notes	Ref
November 7, 2022	37	MF	(United States) Stiven Jimenez	(United States) FC Cincinnati Academy	Homegrown rights acquired from D.C. United (Note: Homegrown rights for $50,000 in 2022 General Allocation Money (GAM) as well as $200,000 in conditional GAM if Jimenez signs a second MLS contract with FC Cincinnati and an additional $300,000 GAM if certain performance-based incentives are met. D.C. United would also retain a percentage of GAM should Jimenez be traded within MLS.)	
December 21, 2022	8	MF	(Ecuador) Marco Angulo	(Ecuador) Independiente del Valle	$3,000,000	
January 5, 2023	33	DF	(United States) Isaiah Foster	(United States) Colorado Springs Switchbacks	Waivers (Note: FC Cincinnati traded $50,000 in General Allocation Money (GAM) to D.C. United in exchange for the top spot in the MLS waiver order.)	
January 6, 2023	26	MF	(United States) Malik Pinto	(United States) FC Cincinnati Academy	Free transfer	
February 9, 2023	13	DF	(Colombia) Santiago Arias	(Spain) Granada CF	Free transfer	
May 25, 2023	58	MF	(United States) Gerardo Valenzuela	(United States) FC Cincinnati Academy	Homegrown player	
June 7, 2023	34	DF	(United States) London Aghedo	(United States) Air Force Falcons	2023 MLS SuperDraft	
June 21, 2023	42	DF	(United States) Bret Halsey	(United States) FC Cincinnati 2	Short-term contract	
July 1, 2023	42	DF	(United States) Bret Halsey	(United States) FC Cincinnati 2	First team contract	
July 5, 2023	9	FW	(Gabon) Aaron Boupendza	(Saudi Arabia) Al Shabab FC (Riyadh)	Designated player	
July 8, 2023	44	FW	(United States) Ben Stitz	(United States) FC Cincinnati 2	Short-term contract	
Aug 4, 2023	44	FW	(United States) Ben Stitz	(United States) FC Cincinnati 2	Short-term contract	

=== Out ===
Date	No.	Pos	Player	Transferred to	Fee/notes	Ref
October 24, 2022	8	MF	(Costa Rica) Allan Cruz		Option declined	
November 11, 2022	3	DF	(United States) John Nelson	(United States) St. Louis City SC	Selected in the 2022 MLS Expansion Draft	
November 15, 2022	24	DF	(England) Tyler Blackett	(England) Rotherham United	Option declined	
November 15, 2022	16	DF	(United States) Zico Bailey	(United States) San Antonio FC	Option declined	
November 15, 2022	20	DF	(United States) Geoff Cameron		Option declined, retired	
November 15, 2022	22	DF	(Costa Rica) Rónald Matarrita	(Ukraine) SC Dnipro-1	Option declined	
November 15, 2022	33	FW	(United States) Nick Markanich	(United States) Charleston Battery	Option declined	
November 15, 2022	17	MF	(United States) Ben Mines	(United States) Miami FC	Option declined	
November 15, 2022	30	GK	(United States) Beckham Sunderland		Option declined	
December 21, 2022	12	FW	(England) Calvin Harris	(United States) Colorado Rapids	$375,000 in GAM	
March 9, 2023	25	GK	(Netherlands) Kenneth Vermeer	(Netherlands) PEC Zwolle	Buyout of a Guaranteed Contract	
March 31, 2023	23	MF	(Ghana) Isaac Atanga	(Norway) Aalesunds FK	Transferred for an undisclosed fee	
July 2, 2023	9	FW	(Brazil) Brenner	(Italy) Udinese	Transfer	

=== Loans in ===
No.	Pos	Player	Loaned from	Loan start date	Loan end date	Ref
14	DF	(Colombia) Yerson Mosquera	(England) Wolverhampton Wanderers F.C.	February 2, 2023	End of 2023 season	

=== Loans out ===
No.	Pos	Player	Loaned to	Loan start date	Loan end date	Ref
23	MF	(Ghana) Isaac Atanga	(Turkey) Göztepe S.K.	August 7, 2022	March 31, 2023	
35	MF	(United States) Harrison Robledo	(United States) Indy Eleven	February 8, 2023	End of season	

=== 2023 MLS SuperDraft picks ===
Round	Pick #	Player	Pos	College	Notes
1	22	Joey Akpunonu	DF	Bowling Green	
2	51	Hunter Morse	GK	Western Michigan	
3	80	London Aghedo	DF	Air Force	

== Competitions ==
Win Draw Loss

=== Preseason ===
On January 9, FC Cincinnati announced a slate of five preseason games to be played during their 26-day preseason camp in Clearwater, Florida.

January 27 Preseason	FC Cincinnati	3–2	Austin FC	Clearwater, Florida
12:00 pm	Hagglund 20'; Brenner 31'; Badji 91'	Report	Rodríguez 9'; Zardes 83'	Stadium: Walter Campbell Sports Park; Attendance: 0
Note: Played in four 30-minute periods for a total of 120 minutes.

February 1 Preseason	South Florida Bulls	0–3	FC Cincinnati	Clearwater, Florida
		Report	Barreal 49'; Ordóñez 77'; Jimenez 85'	Stadium: Walter Campbell Sports Park; Attendance: 0

February 10 Preseason	FC Cincinnati	1–3	Philadelphia Union	Clearwater, Florida
	Vazquez 56' (pen.)	Report	Torres 10'; Carranza 49'; Gazdag 61' (pen.)	Stadium: Joe DiMaggio Sports Complex

February 14 Preseason	FC Cincinnati	4–0	New England Revolution	Clearwater, Florida
	Jimenez; Ordóñez 37', 55'; Badji 41'	Report		Stadium: Walter Campbell Sports Park; Attendance: 0

February 17 Preseason	FC Cincinnati	3–3	Nashville SC	St. Petersburg, Florida
	Santos 34', 49'; Acosta 64' (pen.)	Report		Stadium: Al Lang Stadium; Attendance: 0

=== Major League Soccer ===
==== League tables ====
===== Eastern Conference =====
MLS Eastern Conference table (2023)
Pos	Team	Pld	W	L	T	GF	GA	GD	Pts	Qualification
1	FC Cincinnati	34	20	5	9	57	39	+18	69	Qualification for round one and the CONCACAF Champions Cup round one
2	Orlando City SC	34	18	7	9	55	39	+16	63	Qualification for round one
3	Columbus Crew	34	16	9	9	67	46	+21	57	Qualification for round one
4	Philadelphia Union	34	15	9	10	57	41	+16	55	Qualification for round one
5	New England Revolution	34	15	9	10	58	46	+12	55	Qualification for round one

Source: MLS
Rules for classification: 1) points; 2) total wins; 3) total goal differential; 4) total goals scored; 5) fewer disciplinary points; 6) away goal differential; 7) away goals scored; 8) home goals differential; 9) home goals scored; 10) coin toss (2 clubs tied) or drawing of lots (≥3 clubs tied)

===== Overall =====
Overall MLS standings table
Pos	Team	Pld	W	L	T	GF	GA	GD	Pts	Qualification
1	FC Cincinnati (S)	34	20	5	9	57	39	+18	69	Qualification for the CONCACAF Champions Cup round one (Note: As 2023 MLS Supporters' Shield champions)
2	Orlando City SC	34	18	7	9	55	39	+16	63	Qualification for the CONCACAF Champions Cup round one (Note: As highest-ranked club in 2023 MLS Supporters' Shield not already qualified)
3	Columbus Crew (C)	34	16	9	9	67	46	+21	57	Qualification for the CONCACAF Champions Cup round of 16 (Note: As MLS Cup 2023 champions)
4	St. Louis City SC	34	17	12	5	62	45	+17	56	Qualification for the CONCACAF Champions Cup round one (Note: As 2023 Western Conference regular season champions)
5	Philadelphia Union	34	15	9	10	57	41	+16	55	Qualification for the CONCACAF Champions Cup round one (Note: As 2023 Leagues Cup third place)

Source: MLS
Rules for classification: 1) points; 2) total wins; 3) total goal differential; 4) total goals scored; 5) fewer disciplinary points; 6) away goal differential; 7) away goals scored; 8) home goals differential; 9) home goals scored; 10) coin toss (2 clubs tied) or drawing of lots (≥3 clubs tied)
(C) MLS Cup champion; (S) Supporters' Shield winner

==== Results ====
Matchday	1	2	3	4	5	6	7	8	9	10	11	12	13	14	15	16	17	18	19	20	21	22	23	24	25	26	27	28	29	30	31	32	33	34
Stadium	H	A	H	A	A	H	H	A	H	A	H	H	H	A	A	H	A	H	A	H	A	A	H	A	H	A	H	A	A	H	A	H	A	H
Result	W	D	W	D	W	W	W	L	W	D	W	W	W	W	W	W	D	W	L	D	D	W	W	L	W	W	L	D	D	W	W	L	W	D
Conf. pos.	5	5	3	3	2	1	1	2	2	2	2	1	1	1	1	1	1	1	1	1	1	1	1	1	1	1	1	1	1	1	1	1	1	1

W = Win; D = Draw; L = Loss

February 25 1	FC Cincinnati	2–1	Houston Dynamo	Cincinnati, Ohio
7:30 p.m. EDT	Santos 19'; Nwobodo 48'; Barreal (yellow card) 84'	Report	Artur (yellow card) 10'; Schmitt 45+2', (yellow card) 81'	Stadium: TQL Stadium; Attendance: 25,513; Referee: Chris Penso

March 4 2	Orlando City	0–0	FC Cincinnati	Orlando, Florida
7:30 p.m. EDT	Cartagena (yellow card) 28'	Report	Santos (yellow card) 90+1'	Stadium: Exploria Stadium; Attendance: 18,062; Referee: Ismail Elfath

March 11 3	FC Cincinnati	1–0	Seattle Sounders FC	Cincinnati, Ohio
7:30 p.m. EDT	Barreal (yellow card) 24'; Acosta (yellow card) 39'; Brenner 63'; Hagglund (red card) 83'	Report	João Paulo (yellow card) 57'; Yeimar (yellow card) 90+2'	Stadium: TQL Stadium; Attendance: 25,513; Referee: Joseph Dickerson

March 18 4	Chicago Fire FC	3–3	FC Cincinnati	Chicago, Illinois
8:30 p.m. EDT	(yellow card) 13' Terán; 32', (yellow card) 90+2' Przybyłko; 45' (pen.) Czichos; 46' Mueller; (yellow card) 58' Giménez; (yellow card) 65' M. Navarro; (yellow card) 90' Pineda	Report	Moreno 8', 87'; Vazquez (yellow card) 58'; Santos 84'	Stadium: Soldier Field; Attendance: 7,815; Referee: Fotis Bazakos

March 25 5	Nashville SC	0–1	FC Cincinnati	Nashville, Tennessee
8:30 p.m. EDT	Moore (yellow card) 56'; Bunbury (yellow card) 72'	Report	Nwobodo (yellow card) 21'; Pinto (yellow card) 45'; Vazquez 48'; Miazga (yellow card) 72'; Barreal (yellow card) 80'	Stadium: Geodis Park; Attendance: 28,453; Referee: Ismir Pekmic

April 1 6	FC Cincinnati	1–0	Inter Miami CF	Cincinnati, Ohio
7:30 p.m. EDT	Angulo (yellow card) 27'; Mosquera 45+5'; Acosta (yellow card) 51'; Brenner (yellow card) 72'	Report	Pizarro (yellow card) 13'; Duke (yellow card) 45+4'	Stadium: TQL Stadium; Attendance: 25,082; Referee: Nima Saghafi

April 8 7	FC Cincinnati	1–0	Philadelphia Union	Cincinnati, Ohio
7:30 p.m. EDT	Mosquera (yellow card) 48'; Acosta 69' (pen.)	Report	Mbaizo (yellow card) 21'; Blake (yellow card) 69'	Stadium: TQL Stadium; Attendance: 25,513; Referee: Ted Unkel

April 15 8	St. Louis City SC	5–1	FC Cincinnati	St. Louis, Missouri
8:30 p.m. EDT	Stroud 3', (yellow card) 80'; Löwen 39'; Hiebert 45+2'; Gioacchini 53'; Celentano 57' (o.g.); Ostrák (yellow card) 76'	Report	Nwobodo (yellow card) 27'; Santos (yellow card) 43', (goal) 62'	Stadium: CityPark; Attendance: 22,423; Referee: Lukasz Szpala

April 22 9	FC Cincinnati	2–1	Portland Timbers	Cincinnati, Ohio
7:30 p.m. EDT	Nwobodo (yellow card) 32'; Santos 34'; Vazquez 58'; Mosquera (yellow card) 84'; Angulo (yellow card) 90+7'	Report	Mabiala (yellow card) 20'; Asprilla (yellow card) 30', (goal) 60'; Chara (yellow card) 72'; McGraw (yellow card) 90+1'	Stadium: TQL Stadium; Attendance: 25,513; Referee: Allen Chapman

April 29 10	New England Revolution	1–1	FC Cincinnati	Foxborough, Massachusetts
7:30 p.m. EDT	45+3' Boateng; (yellow card) 89' Wood	Report	Miazga (yellow card) 12'; Mosquera 31'; Barreal (yellow card) 33'; Santos (yellow card) 45+9'	Stadium: Gillette Stadium; Attendance: 30,080; Referee: Alex Chilowicz

May 6 11	FC Cincinnati	2–1	D.C. United	Cincinnati, Ohio
7:30 p.m. EDT	Acosta (yellow card) 39' (goal) 59'; Mosquera (yellow card) 70'; Barreal 73'; Kubo (yellow card) 90+5'; Brenner (yellow card) 90+5'; Celentano (yellow card) 90+7'	Report	(yellow card) 21' Greene; (yellow card) 60' Benteke; 90' Fountas; (yellow card) 90+9' O'Brien	Stadium: TQL Stadium; Attendance: 25,513; Referee: Guido Gonzalez

May 17 12	FC Cincinnati	3–0	CF Montréal	Cincinnati, Ohio
7:30 p.m. EDT	Waterman 2' (og); Acosta 26'; Nwobodo (yellow card) 34'; Vazquez 65'	Report		Stadium: TQL Stadium; Attendance: 23,461; Referee: Mark Allatin

May 20 13 – Hell Is Real Derby	FC Cincinnati	3–2	Columbus Crew	Cincinnati, Ohio
7:30 p.m. EDT	Acosta 17' 23' (pen); Miazga (yellow card) 63'; Moreno 67'	Report	40' Zelarayan; 52' (yellow card) 72' Amundsen	Stadium: TQL Stadium; Attendance: 25,513; Referee: Nima Saghafi

May 27 14	Colorado Rapids	0–1	FC Cincinnati	Commerce City, Colorado
9:30 p.m. EDT	(yellow card) 62' Cabral	Report	33' Badji; (yellow card) 64' Nwobodo	Stadium: Dick's Sporting Goods Park; Attendance: 15,438; Referee: Marcos de Oliveira

May 31 15	New York City FC	1–3	FC Cincinnati	New York, New York
7:30 p.m. EDT	Cufré (yellow card) 41' (goal) 64'; Chanot (yellow card) 53'; Sands (yellow card) 56'; Gray (yellow card) 58'; Pereira (yellow card) 66'; Alfaro (yellow card) 82'; Morales (yellow card) 88'	Report	38' (yellow card) 50' Acosta; (yellow card) 43' Mosquera; (yellow card) 45+5' (goal) 70' (pen.) Vazquez; 59' Barreal; (yellow card) 90+1' Gaddis	Stadium: Yankee Stadium; Attendance: 14,806; Referee: Armando Villarreal

June 3 16	FC Cincinnati	1–0	Chicago Fire FC	Cincinnati, Ohio
7:30 p.m. EDT	Miazga (yellow card) 54'; Acosta 83'; Barreal (yellow card) 89'	Report	Souquet (yellow card) 28'; Shaqiri (yellow card) 67'; Haile-Selassie (yellow card) 73'	Stadium: TQL Stadium; Attendance: 25,513; Referee: Chris Penso

June 10 17	Vancouver Whitecaps FC	1–1	FC Cincinnati	Vancouver, British Columbia
10:30 p.m. EDT	Raposo (yellow card) 60'; Gauld 89' (pen.); Vite (yellow card) 90+2'	Report	Murphy (yellow card) 29'; Mosquera (yellow card) 77'; Acosta 83'	Stadium: BC Place; Attendance: 16,086; Referee: Ismir Pekmic

June 21 18	FC Cincinnati	3–0	Toronto FC	Cincinnati, Ohio
7:30 p.m. EDT	Nwobodo (yellow card) 19'; Arias 35'; Gaddis (yellow card) 41'; Acosta 54'; Badji 63'; Halsey (yellow card) 82'	Report	Petretta (yellow card) 25'; Bernardeschi (yellow card) 41'	Stadium: TQL Stadium; Attendance: 25,513; Referee: Mark Allatin

June 24 19	D.C. United	3–0	FC Cincinnati	Washington, D.C.
7:30 p.m. EDT	Santos 10'; Williams 17'; Dájome 43'; Najar (yellow card) 64'	Report	Murphy (yellow card) 66' (yellow-red card) 79'	Stadium: Audi Field; Attendance: 18,864; Referee: Sergii Boiko

July 1 20	FC Cincinnati	2–2	New England Revolution	Cincinnati, Ohio
7:30 p.m. EDT	Badji 11', 55'; Nwobodo (yellow card) 36'	Report	Badji 15' (o.g.); Bou 24'; Gil (yellow card) 51'; Blessing (yellow card) 52'	Stadium: TQL Stadium; Attendance: 25,513; Referee: Jon Freemon

July 8 21	Charlotte FC	2–2	FC Cincinnati	Charlotte, North Carolina
7:30 p.m. EDT	Świderski 14', 24', (yellow card) 90+3'; Corujo (yellow card) 27'; Lindsey (yellow card) 45+2'; Arfield (yellow card) 69'; Jóźwiak (yellow card) 89'	Report	Mosquera (yellow card) 11'; Acosta 52'; Santos (yellow card) 57'; Barreal 68'; Murphy (yellow card) 29' (yellow-red card) 75'	Stadium: Bank of America Stadium; Attendance: 43,613; Referee: Ted Unkel

July 12 22	New York Red Bulls	1–2	FC Cincinnati	Harrison, New Jersey
7:30 p.m. EDT	Ndam (yellow card) 3'; Fernandez 28' (pen.); Edelman (yellow card) 45+1'; Vanzeir (yellow card) 64'	Report	Pinto (yellow card) 19'; Santos (yellow card) 62'; Ordóñez (yellow card) 71'; Acosta 80' (pen.); Nwobodo 90+3'	Stadium: Red Bull Arena; Attendance: 13,439; Referee: Lukasz Szpala

July 15 23	FC Cincinnati	3–1	Nashville SC	Cincinnati, Ohio
7:30 p.m. EDT	Arias (yellow card) 26', (goal) 74'; Acosta 42' (pen.), (yellow card) 45+7'; Miazga (yellow card) 62'; Vázquez (yellow card) 87'; Boupendza 90+9', (yellow card) 90+11'	Report	Zimmerman 31'; Washington (yellow card) 37' (yellow-red card) 68'; Picault (yellow card) 62' (yellow-red card) 70'; Haakenson (yellow card) 86'	Stadium: TQL Stadium; Attendance: 25,513; Referee: Ramy Touchan

August 20 24 – Hell Is Real Derby	Columbus Crew	3–0	FC Cincinnati	Columbus, Ohio
7:30 p.m. EDT	Morris 15'; Hernández 23' (pen.); Russell-Rowe 90+6'	Report	Nwobodo (yellow card) 45+2'; Arias (yellow card) 76'	Stadium: Lower.com Field; Attendance: 20,730; Referee: Ted Unkel

August 26 25	FC Cincinnati	3–0	New York City FC	Cincinnati, Ohio
7:30 p.m. EDT	Boupendza 6'; Miazga (yellow card) 45'; Kubo (yellow card) 50'; Moreno 52'; Hagglund 59'	Report	Risa (yellow card) 88'; Perea (yellow card) 90+2'	Stadium: TQL Stadium; Attendance: 25,513; Referee: Chris Penso

August 30 26	Atlanta United FC	1–2	FC Cincinnati	Atlanta, Georgia
7:30 p.m. EDT	Mosquera 10'; Rossetto (yellow card) 60'; Muyumba (yellow card) 72'	Report	Nwobodo (yellow card) 41'; Acosta 75'; Vazquez 80'	Stadium: Mercedes-Benz Stadium; Attendance: 42,568; Referee: Armando Villarreal

September 2 27	FC Cincinnati	0–1	Orlando City SC	Cincinnati, Ohio
7:30 p.m. EDT	Acosta (yellow card) 44'; Boupendza (yellow card) 90+4'	Report	Santos (yellow card) 13'; Thórhallsson (yellow card) 41'; Torres 44'; Araújo (yellow card) 55'; Urso (yellow card) 90+5'; Cartagena (red card) 90+5'; Gallese (yellow card) 90+11'	Stadium: TQL Stadium; Attendance: 25,513; Referee: Drew Fischer

September 16 28	Philadelphia Union	2–2	FC Cincinnati	Chester, Pennsylvania
7:30 p.m. EDT	Elliott (yellow card) 19' (yellow-red card) 90+4'; Gazdag (yellow card) 21', (goal) 37' (pen.); Martínez 23'; Lowe (yellow card) 42'; Carranza (yellow card) 63'; Wagner (yellow card) 74'; Baribo (yellow card) 85'	Report	Miazga (yellow card) 19'; Celentano (yellow card) 35'; Mosquera (yellow card) 36' (yellow-red card) 83'; Hagglund (yellow card) 45+4'; Boupendza 49'; Vázquez 76'	Stadium: Subaru Park; Attendance: 19,365; Referee: Ismail Elfath

September 20 29	CF Montréal	1–1	FC Cincinnati	Montreal, Quebec
7:30 p.m. EDT	Wanyama (yellow card) 34'; Opoku 53'; Offor (yellow card) 90+2'; Sirois (yellow card) 90+5'	Report	Miazga (yellow card) 90'; Arias (yellow card) 90+2'; Acosta 90+7'	Stadium: Saputo Stadium; Attendance: 13,603; Referee: Jon Freemon

September 23 30	FC Cincinnati	3–0	Charlotte FC	Cincinnati, Ohio
7:30 p.m. EDT	Barreal 45+1'; Boupendza 50'; Acosta 78'	Report	Westwood (yellow card) 35'; Kahlina (yellow card) 45+3'	Stadium: TQL Stadium; Attendance: 25,513; Referee: Jair Marrufo

September 30 31	Toronto FC	2–3	FC Cincinnati	Toronto, Ontario
7:30 p.m. EDT	Osorio 39', 44'; Antonoglou (yellow card) 74'; Prince Osei Owusu (yellow card) 86'	Report	Vázquez 28', 35'; Boupendza 72'	Stadium: BMO Field; Attendance: 24,658; Referee: Alex Chilowicz

October 4 32	FC Cincinnati	1–2	New York Red Bulls	Cincinnati, Ohio
7:30 p.m. EDT	Gaddis (yellow card) 27'; Powell (yellow card) 49' (yellow-red card) 88'; Acosta 68' (pen.), (yellow card) 90+10'; Hagglund (yellow card) 73'; Pinto (yellow card) 82'; Barreal (yellow card) 90+8'	Report	Amaya 12'; Manoel 17'; Reyes (yellow card) 53'; Coronel (yellow card) 90+9'; Duncan (yellow card) 90+10'	Stadium: TQL Stadium; Attendance: 25,513; Referee: Chris Penso

October 7 33	Inter Miami CF	0–1	FC Cincinnati	Fort Lauderdale, Florida
7:30 p.m. EDT		Report	Nwobodo (yellow card) 27'; Barreal 78'; Celentano (yellow card) 84'	Stadium: DRV PNK Stadium; Attendance: 20,344; Referee: Rubiel Vazquez

October 21 34	FC Cincinnati	2–2	Atlanta United FC	Cincinnati, Ohio
6:00 p.m. EDT	Badji 25'; Acosta 45+2'; Miazga (yellow card) 72'	Report	Giakoumakis 12', 32'; Almada (yellow card) 36' (yellow-red card) 51'; Thiaré (yellow card) 85'	Stadium: TQL Stadium; Attendance: 25,513; Referee: Joseph Dickerson

=== MLS Cup Playoffs ===
October 29 Round One	FC Cincinnati	3–0	New York Red Bulls	Cincinnati, Ohio
8:00 pm EDT	Barreal 23', 89', (yellow card) 52'; Miazga (yellow card) 33'; Acosta 35'; Boupendza (yellow card) 74'	Report	Manoel (yellow card) 76'; Amaya (yellow card) 90'	Stadium: TQL Stadium; Attendance: 24,022; Referee: Rubiel Vazquez

November 4 Round One	New York Red Bulls	1–1 (7–8 p)	FC Cincinnati	Harrison, New Jersey
7:00 pm EDT	Barlow (yellow card) 41', (goal) 45'; Reyes (yellow card) 55'	Report	Arias (yellow card) 39'; Mosquera (yellow card) 75'; Boupendza 75'; Miazga (yellow card) 90+9' (yellow card) PSO	Stadium: Red Bull Arena; Attendance: 16,074; Referee: Victor Rivas
	Penalties
	Fernandez (penalty scored); Amaya (penalty scored); S. Nealis (penalty scored); Harper (penalty scored); Tolkin (penalty missed); D. Nealis (penalty scored); Manoel (penalty scored); Stroud (penalty scored); Ngoma (penalty missed); Reyes (penalty missed)		(penalty scored) Acosta; (penalty scored) Kubo; (penalty missed) Arias; (penalty scored) Vázquez; (penalty scored) Barreal; (penalty scored) Miazga; (penalty scored) Boupendza; (penalty scored) Santos; (penalty missed) Mosquera; (penalty scored) Moreno
Note: FC Cincinnati won series 2–0.

November 25 Conference semifinals	FC Cincinnati	1–0	Philadelphia Union	Cincinnati, Ohio
8:00 pm ET	Gaddis (yellow card) 30'; Boupendza (yellow card) 76'; Mosquera 90+4'	Report	Lowe (yellow card) 11'; Carranza (yellow card) 51'	Stadium: TQL Stadium; Attendance: 25,513; Referee: Ismail Elfath

December 2 Conference finals	FC Cincinnati	2–3 (a.e.t.)	Columbus Crew	Cincinnati, Ohio
6:00 pm EST	Vázquez 14', (yellow card) 99'; Acosta 45+3', (yellow card) 73'; Badji (yellow card) 82'; Mosquera (yellow card) 117'	Report	Moreira (yellow card) 45+2'; Powell 75' (o.g.); Rossi 86'; Ramirez 115'; Gressel (yellow card) 120+1'	Stadium: TQL Stadium; Attendance: 25,513; Referee: Allen Chapman

=== U.S. Open Cup ===
As a Major League Soccer club, FC Cincinnati enters the U.S. Open Cup in the third round. The third round pairings were announced on April 6.

FC Cincinnati was regionally placed into group 5 with New York City FC, Columbus Crew SC and Loudoun United for the draw in the Round of 32. On April 27, FC Cincinnati was drawn to host New York City FC.

After defeating NYCFC 1–0 at TQL Stadium on May 10, FC Cincinnati was placed in the Northeast Group for the round of 16 draw, which will be held on May 11, 2023. The other three clubs in the group are MLS clubs Columbus Crew and New York Red Bulls, and USL Championship team Pittsburgh Riverhounds SC. FC Cincinnati was drawn to visit the New York Red Bulls.

After defeating the New York Red Bulls on penalties, FC Cincinnati hosted their quarterfinals matchup with the Pittsburgh Riverhounds SC on June 6, winning 3–1.

FC Cincinnati hosted Inter Miami CF in the semifinals on August 23 and after a 3–3 tie a.e.t, fell 4–5 in penalty kicks to end their Cup run.

April 26 Third Round	FC Cincinnati (MLS) (Ohio)	1–0	(Kentucky) Louisville City FC (USLC)	Cincinnati, Ohio
7:00 p.m. EDT	Jimenez (yellow card) 40'; Ordonez 85'	Report		Stadium: TQL Stadium; Attendance: 10,062; Referee: Calin Radosav

May 10 Round of 32	FC Cincinnati (MLS) (Ohio)	1–0	(New York (state)) New York City FC (MLS)	Cincinnati, Ohio
7:00 PM EDT	Nwobodo (yellow card) 11'; Mosquera (yellow card) 20'; Vazquez 56'; Miazga (yellow card) 81'	Report	(yellow card) 82' Gray; (yellow card) 89' Haak	Stadium: TQL Stadium; Attendance: 7,196; Referee: Timothy Ford

May 23 Round of 16	New York Red Bulls (MLS) (New Jersey)	1–1 (a.e.t.) (3–5 p)	(Ohio) FC Cincinnati (MLS)	Harrison, New Jersey
7:30 PM EDT	Ndam (yellow card) 10'; Cásseres (yellow card) 22'; Nealis (yellow card) 28'; Tolkin (yellow card) 89'; Meara (yellow card) 89'; Vanzeir 90+2'; Carmona (yellow card) 99'	Report	42' Kubo; (yellow card) 69' Arias; (yellow card) 89' Badji; (yellow card) 90+2' Barreal	Stadium: Red Bull Arena; Attendance: 4,131; Referee: Fotis Bazakos
	Penalties
	Vanzeir (penalty missed); Manoel (penalty scored); Carmona (penalty scored); Cásseres (penalty scored)		(penalty scored) Acosta; (penalty scored) Moreno; (penalty scored) Badji; (penalty scored) Mosquera; (penalty scored) Barreal

June 6 Quarterfinals	FC Cincinnati (MLS) (Ohio)	3–1	(Pennsylvania) Pittsburgh Riverhounds SC (USLC)	Cincinnati, Ohio
7:00 PM EDT	Nwobodo (yellow card) 11'; Murphy (yellow card) 29'; Badji (yellow card) 35'; Vazquez 56'; Barreal 71'; Acosta (yellow card) 74'; Arias 90+3'	Report	Biasi (yellow card) 23'; Showunmi 90+4'	Stadium: TQL Stadium; Attendance: 16,613; Referee: Elvis Osmanovic

August 23 Semifinals	FC Cincinnati (MLS) (Ohio)	3–3 (a.e.t.) (4–5 p)	(Florida) Inter Miami CF (MLS)	Cincinnati, Ohio
7:00 PM EDT	Acosta 18', (yellow card) 85'; Nwobodo (yellow card) 31'; Vazquez 53'; Barreal (yellow card) 90'; Powell (yellow card) 111'; Kubo 114'; Arias (yellow card) 117'	Report	(yellow card) 24' Alba; (yellow card) 41' Mota; 68', 90+7' Campana; (yellow card) 70' Avilés; (yellow card) 80' Kryvtsoy; 93' Martínez	Stadium: TQL Stadium; Attendance: 25,513; Referee: Joseph Dickerson
	Penalties
	Kubo (penalty scored); Arias (penalty scored); Santos (penalty scored); Miazga (penalty scored); Hagglund (penalty missed)		(penalty scored) Messi; (penalty scored) Farías; (penalty scored) Ruiz; (penalty scored) Martínez; (penalty scored) Cremaschi

=== Leagues Cup ===
Both knockout stage games were hosted by FC Cincinnati at TQL Stadium. Led by Brandon Vazquez with 4 goals, the club advanced to the knockout stage of the Leagues Cup after securing a penalty shootout win against Sporting Kansas City and a two-day victory against Club Deportivo Guadalajara. The Chivas game was initially played on Thursday, July 28, but was halted in the 60th minute for a lengthy severe weather delay. When the game finally resumed 18.5 hours later, the calendar read Friday, July 29. The final wrinkle was that it was decided to finish the final 30 minutes "behind closed doors" as a safety precaution for staff, players and fans.

The Orange and Blue hosted Nashville SC in their Round of 32 matchup at TQL Stadium on August 4, 2023. The game ended tied 1–1 after 90 minutes with goals from Anibal Godoy of Nashville SC and Brandon Vazquez via penalty kick, his 5th in Leagues Cup play, of FC Cincinnati. Nashville advanced to the Round of 16 via penalty kicks (5–4).

==== Group stage: Central 3 ====
Pos	Team	Pld	W	PW	PL	L	GF	GA	GD	Pts	Qualification
1	(United States) FC Cincinnati	2	1	1	0	0	6	4	+2	5	Advance to knockout stage
2	(United States) Sporting Kansas City	2	1	0	1	0	4	3	+1	4	Advance to knockout stage
3	(Mexico) Guadalajara	2	0	0	0	2	1	4	−3	0	

Source: Leagues Cup
Rules for classification: Tiebreakers

July 23 GS	FC Cincinnati (United States)	3–3 (4–2 p)	(United States) Sporting Kansas City	Cincinnati, OH
7:30 pm ET	Murphy (yellow card) 10'; Mosquera (yellow card) 11'; Pulskamp 34' (o.g.); Moreno (yellow card) 48'; Boupendza (yellow card) 50'; Vazquez 56'; Powell (yellow card) 68'; Acosta 90+8' (pen.)	Report	Hagglund 9' (o.g.); Rosero 12', (yellow card) 90+6'; Pulido (red card) 30'; Kinda (yellow card) 51', (goal) 69' (pen.); Pulskamp (yellow card) 83'; Thommy (yellow card) 90+2'; Espinoza (yellow card) 90+8'	Stadium: TQL Stadium; Attendance: 24,524; Referee: Daniel Quintero Huitrón
	Penalties
	Acosta (penalty scored); Vazquez (penalty scored); Kubo (penalty scored); Miazga (penalty scored)		(penalty scored) Thommy; (penalty scored) Shelton; (penalty missed) Walter; (penalty missed) Fontas

July 27 GS	FC Cincinnati (United States)	3–1	(Mexico) Guadalajara	Cincinnati, OH
8:00 pm ET	Vazquez 2', 8', 73'; Angulo (yellow card) 75'; Barreal (yellow card) 75'	Report	Sepúlveda (red card) 45+3'; Briseño 61'; Mozo (yellow card) 75'	Stadium: TQL Stadium; Attendance: 25,143; Referee: Benjamin Pineda
Note: The game was suspended in the 60th minute due to severe weather, the remaining 30 minutes were completed the following day at 2:00 PM EST behind closed doors.

==== Knockout stage ====
August 4 R32	FC Cincinnati (United States)	1–1 (4–5 p)	(United States) Nashville SC	Cincinnati, OH
8:00 pm ET	Vazquez 85' (pen.)	Report	MacNaughton (yellow card) 59'; Godoy 64'	Stadium: TQL Stadium; Attendance: 19,911; Referee: Nima Saghafi
	Penalties
	Acosta (penalty scored); Vazquez (penalty scored); Miazga (penalty missed); Kubo (penalty scored); Barreal (penalty scored)		(penalty scored) Mukhtar; (penalty scored) Picault; (penalty scored) Godoy; (penalty scored) Zimmerman; (penalty scored) McCarty

== Statistics ==
=== Appearances and goals ===
Numbers after plus-sign(+) denote appearances as a substitute.

No.	Pos	Nat	Player	Total		MLS		MLS Cup		U.S. Open Cup		Leagues Cup	
No.	Pos	Nat	Player	Apps	Goals	Apps	Goals	Apps	Goals	Apps	Goals	Apps	Goals
Goalkeepers
18	GK	(United States) USA	Roman Celentano	37	0	33	0	4	0	0	0	0	0
11	GK	(United States) USA	Alec Kann	9	0	1	0	0	0	5	0	3	0
Defenders
2	DF	(Jamaica) JAM	Alvas Powell	35	0	10+15	0	2	0	2+3	0	2+1	0
3	DF	(United States) USA	Joey Akpunonu	3	0	0+1	0	0	0	1+1	0	0	0
4	DF	(United States) USA	Nick Hagglund	33	1	26	1	0	0	4	0	2+1	0
15	DF	(Colombia) COL	Santiago Arias	32	3	16+11	2	2	0	3	1	0	0
13	DF	(Colombia) COL	Yerson Mosquera	35	3	25+1	2	4	1	2+1	0	2	0
21	DF	(United States) USA	Matt Miazga	36	0	27	0	2	0	3+1	0	2+1	0
28	DF	(United States) USA	Ray Gaddis	35	0	15+12	0	2+1	0	2+2	0	1	0
31	MF	(Argentina) ARG	Álvaro Barreal	46	8	32+2	5	4	2	2+3	1	3	0
32	DF	(United States) USA	Ian Murphy	34	0	17+5	0	4	0	5	0	3	0
33	DF	(United States) USA	Isaiah Foster	1	0	0	0	0	0	1	0	0	0
42	DF	(United States) USA	Bret Halsey	12	0	2+7	0	0	0	0+1	0	0+2	0
Midfielders
5	MF	(Nigeria) NGR	Obinna Nwobodo	40	2	30	2	2+1	0	4	0	2+1	0
7	MF	(Japan) JPN	Yuya Kubo	36	2	9+15	0	2+2	0	2+3	2	0+3	0
8	MF	(Ecuador) ECU	Marco Angulo	31	0	9+13	0	0+2	0	2+2	0	1+2	0
10	MF	(Argentina) ARG	Luciano Acosta	44	21	29+3	17	4	2	3+2	1	3	1
26	MF	(United States) USA	Malik Pinto	28	0	2+20	0	0+1	0	3	0	1+1	0
37	DF	(United States) USA	Stiven Jimenez	2	0	0+1	0	0	0	1	0	0	0
58	DF	(United States) USA	Gerardo Valenzuela	2	0	0+2	0	0	0	0	0	0	0
93	MF	(Venezuela) VEN	Júnior Moreno	40	4	27+2	4	4	0	2+2	0	2+1	0
Forwards
9	FW	(Gabon) GAB	Aaron Boupendza	18	6	6+4	5	2+2	1	1	0	3	0
11	FW	(Brazil) BRA	Sérgio Santos	30	4	11+13	4	0+3	0	0+2	0	0+1	0
14	FW	(Senegal) SEN	Dominique Badji	31	4	10+13	4	2+2	0	3+1	0	0	0
19	FW	(United States) USA	Brandon Vazquez	42	17	29+2	8	4	1	3+1	3	3	5
29	FW	(United States) USA	Arquimides Ordóñez	10	1	4+4	0	0	0	1+1	1	0	0
44	FW	(United States) USA	Ben Stitz	1	0	0+1	0	0	0	0	0	0	0
Players who have played for FC Cincinnati this season but have left the club:
9	FW	(Brazil) BRA	Brenner	8	1	6+2	1	0	0	0	0	0	0

- Last updated: December 12, 2023
- Source: Team Stats

=== Top scorers ===
Rank	Position	No.	Name	MLS	MLS Cup	U.S. Open Cup	Leagues Cup	Total
1	MF	10	(Argentina) Luciano Acosta	17	2	1	1	21
2	FW	19	(United States) Brandon Vazquez	8	1	3	5	17
3	DF	31	(Argentina) Álvaro Barreal	5	2	1	0	8
4	FW	9	(Gabon) Aaron Boupendza	5	1	0	0	6
5	FW	14	(Senegal) Dominique Badji	5	0	0	0	5
6	FW	17	(Brazil) Sérgio Santos	4	0	0	0	4
6	MF	93	(Venezuela) Júnior Moreno	4	0	0	0	4
8	DF	13	(Colombia) Santiago Arias	2	0	1	0	3
8	DF	15	(Ecuador) Yerson Mosquera	2	1	0	0	3
10	MF	5	(Nigeria) Obinna Nwobodo	2	0	0	0	2
10	MF	7	(Japan) Yuya Kubo	0	0	2	0	2
12	FW	9	(Brazil) Brenner	1	0	0	0	1
12	FW	29	(United States) Arquimides Ordonez	0	0	1	0	1
12	DF	4	(United States) Nick Hagglund	1	0	0	0	1
Total				55	7	9	6	77

- Last updated: December 12, 2023
- Source: Team Stats

=== Top assists ===
Rank	Position	No.	Name	MLS	MLS Cup	U.S. Open Cup	Leagues Cup	Total
1	MF	10	(Argentina) Luciano Acosta	14	2	2	2	20
2	MF	31	(Argentina) Álvaro Barreal	9	1	3	2	15
3	MF	5	(Nigeria) Obinna Nwobodo	5	0	0	0	5
4	MF	7	(Japan) Yuya Kubo	3	0	0	1	4
4	FW	14	(Senegal) Dominique Badji	3	0	1	0	4
4	FW	19	(United States) Brandon Vazquez	4	0	0	0	4
7	MF	8	(Ecuador) Marco Angulo	2	0	1	0	3
7	MF	93	(Venezuela) Júnior Moreno	2	1	0	0	3
7	FW	9	(Gabon) Aaron Boupendza	0	1	1	1	3
10	DF	13	(Colombia) Santiago Arias	1	0	1	0	2
11	DF	2	(Jamaica) Alvas Powell	1	0	0	0	1
11	FW	9	(Brazil) Brenner	1	0	0	0	1
11	DF	15	(Ecuador) Yerson Mosquera	1	0	0	0	1
11	FW	17	(Brazil) Sérgio Santos	1	0	0	0	1
11	DF	21	(United States) Matt Miazga	1	0	0	0	1
11	DF	32	(United States) Ian Murphy	0	1	0	0	1
Total				48	6	9	6	69

- Last updated: December 12, 2023
- Source: Team Stats

=== Disciplinary record ===
No.	Pos.	Player	MLS			MLS Cup			U.S. Open Cup			Leagues Cup			Total		
No.	Pos.	Player	Yellow card	(yellow card) (yellow-red card)	Red card	Yellow card	(yellow card) (yellow-red card)	Red card	Yellow card	(yellow card) (yellow-red card)	Red card	Yellow card	(yellow card) (yellow-red card)	Red card	Yellow card	(yellow card) (yellow-red card)	Red card
5	MF	(Nigeria) Obinna Nwobodo	10	0	0	0	0	0	3	0	0	0	0	0	13	0	0
21	DF	(United States) Matt Miazga	9	0	0	3	0	0	1	0	0	0	0	0	13	0	0
15	DF	(Colombia) Yerson Mosquera	7	1	0	1	0	0	1	0	0	1	0	0	10	1	0
31	MF	(Argentina) Álvaro Barreal	6	0	0	1	0	0	2	0	0	1	0	0	10	0	0
10	MF	(Argentina) Luciano Acosta	7	0	0	1	0	0	2	0	0	0	0	0	10	0	0
13	DF	(Colombia) Santiago Arias	3	0	0	1	0	0	2	0	0	0	0	0	6	0	0
17	FW	(Brazil) Sérgio Santos	5	0	0	0	0	0	0	0	0	0	0	0	5	0	0
9	FW	(Gabon) Aaron Boupendza	2	0	0	2	0	0	0	0	0	1	0	0	5	0	0
32	DF	(United States) Ian Murphy	3	2	0	0	0	0	1	0	0	1	0	0	4	2	0
28	DF	(United States) Ray Gaddis	3	0	0	1	0	0	0	0	0	0	0	0	4	0	0
18	GK	(United States) Roman Celentano	3	0	0	0	0	0	0	0	0	0	0	0	3	0	0
19	FW	(United States) Brandon Vazquez	3	0	0	0	0	0	0	0	0	0	0	0	3	0	0
26	MF	(United States) Malik Pinto	3	0	0	0	0	0	0	0	0	0	0	0	3	0	0
8	MF	(Ecuador) Marco Angulo	2	0	0	0	0	0	0	0	0	1	0	0	3	0	0
9	FW	(Brazil) Brenner	2	0	0	0	0	0	0	0	0	0	0	0	2	0	0
14	FW	(Senegal) Dominique Badji	0	0	0	0	0	0	2	0	0	0	0	0	2	0	0
7	MF	(Japan) Yuya Kubo	2	0	0	0	0	0	0	0	0	0	0	0	2	0	0
2	DF	(Jamaica) Alvas Powell	0	1	0	0	0	0	1	0	0	1	0	0	2	1	0
4	DF	(United States) Nick Hagglund	2	0	1	0	0	0	0	0	0	0	0	0	2	0	1
42	DF	(United States) Bret Halsey	1	0	0	0	0	0	0	0	0	0	0	0	1	0	0
29	FW	(United States) Arquimides Ordonez	1	0	0	0	0	0	0	0	0	0	0	0	1	0	0
37	MF	(United States) Stevin Jimenez	0	0	0	0	0	0	1	0	0	0	0	0	1	0	0
93	MF	(Venezuela) Júnior Moreno	0	0	0	0	0	0	0	0	0	1	0	0	1	0	0
Total			74	4	1	10	0	0	16	0	0	7	0	0	107	4	1

- Last updated: December 12, 2023
- Source: Team Stats

=== Clean sheets ===
No.	Name	MLS	MLS Cup	U.S. Open Cup	Leagues Cup	Total	Games
18	(United States) Roman Celentano	12	2	0	0	14	36
1	(United States) Alec Kann	0	0	2	0	2	9

- Last updated: December 12, 2023
- Source: Team Stats

== Awards ==
=== MLS Team of the Matchday ===
Matchday	Player	Opponent	Position	Ref
1	(Nigeria) Obinna Nwobodo	Houston Dynamo FC	MF	
3	(Nigeria) Obinna Nwobodo	Seattle Sounders FC	MF	
3	(Brazil) Brenner	Seattle Sounders FC	Bench	
4	(Venezuela) Júnior Moreno	Chicago Fire FC	MF	
5	(United States) Matt Miazga	Nashville SC	Bench	
5	(United States) Brandon Vazquez	Nashville SC	Bench	
6	(Colombia) Yerson Mosquera	Inter Miami CF	DF	
6	(Argentina) Álvaro Barreal	Inter Miami CF	Bench	
7	(United States) Matt Miazga	Philadelphia Union	DF	
9	(Argentina) Álvaro Barreal	Portland Timbers	DF	
9	(Brazil) Sergio Santos	Portland Timbers	Bench	
10	(Colombia) Yerson Mosquera	New England Revolution	DF	
11	(Argentina) Álvaro Barreal	D.C. United	Bench	
11	(Argentina) Luciano Acosta	D.C. United	Bench	
13	(Argentina) Luciano Acosta	CF Montréal	MF	
13	(Nigeria) Obinna Nwobodo	CF Montréal	Bench	
14	(Argentina) Luciano Acosta	Columbus Crew SC	MF	
14	(United States) Roman Celentano	Columbus Crew SC	Bench	
15	(United States) Matt Miazga	Colorado Rapids	Bench	
16	(Argentina) Álvaro Barreal	New York City FC	DF	
16	(Argentina) Luciano Acosta	New York City FC	Bench	
17	(Argentina) Luciano Acosta	Chicago Fire FC	Bench	
20	(Argentina) Luciano Acosta	Toronto FC	MF	
20	(United States) Roman Celentano	Toronto FC	GK	
22	(Senegal) Dominique Badji	New England Revolution	FW	
24	(Argentina) Luciano Acosta	Charlotte FC	MF	
24	(Argentina) Álvaro Barreal	Charlotte FC	Bench	
25	(Nigeria) Obinna Nwobodo	New York Red Bulls	MF	
26	(Argentina) Luciano Acosta	Nashville SC	MF	
26	(Colombia) Santiago Arias	Nashville SC	Bench	
28	(Argentina) Luciano Acosta	New York City FC	MF	
28	(United States) Roman Celentano	New York City FC	Bench	
29	(Argentina) Luciano Acosta	Atlanta United FC	MF	
29	(Argentina) Álvaro Barreal	Atlanta United FC	DF	
29	(United States) Pat Noonan	Atlanta United FC	Coach	
32	(Gabon) Aaron Boupendza	Philadelphia Union	FW	
33	(Argentina) Álvaro Barreal	CF Montréal	DF	
34	(Argentina) Luciano Acosta	Charlotte FC	MF	
35	(United States) Brandon Vazquez	Toronto FC	FW	
35	(United States) Pat Noonan	Toronto FC	Coach	
37	(Argentina) Álvaro Barreal	Inter Miami CF	DF	
38	(Argentina) Álvaro Barreal	Atlanta United FC	Bench	

=== MLS Player of the Matchday ===
Matchday	Player	Opponent	Position	Ref
13	(Argentina) Luciano Acosta	Columbus Crew SC	MF	
34	(Argentina) Luciano Acosta	Charlotte FC	MF	

=== MLS Player of the Month ===
Month	Player	Stats	Ref
July	(Argentina) Luciano Acosta	3 goals, 4 assists	
August	(Argentina) Luciano Acosta	1 goal, 3 assists	

=== MLS All-Star ===
Player	Position	Ref
(Argentina) Luciano Acosta	MF	
(Argentina) Álvaro Barreal	DF	
(United States) Matt Miazga	DF	

=== MLS League Awards ===
Player	Award	Ref
(Argentina) Luciano Acosta	2023 AT&T 5G MLS Goal of the Year	
(Argentina) Luciano Acosta	2023 Landon Donovan MLS Most Valuable Player	
(Argentina) Luciano Acosta	2023 MLS Best XI	
(United States) Roman Celentano	2023 MLS Save of the Year presented by Allstate	
(United States) Matt Miazga	2023 MLS Defender of the Year	
(United States) Matt Miazga	2023 MLS Best XI	
(United States) Pat Noonan	2023 MLS Sigi Schmid Coach of the Year	
(United States) Chris Albright	2023 MLS Sporting Director of the Year	
