= Yerson Mosquera =

Colombian footballer (born 2001)

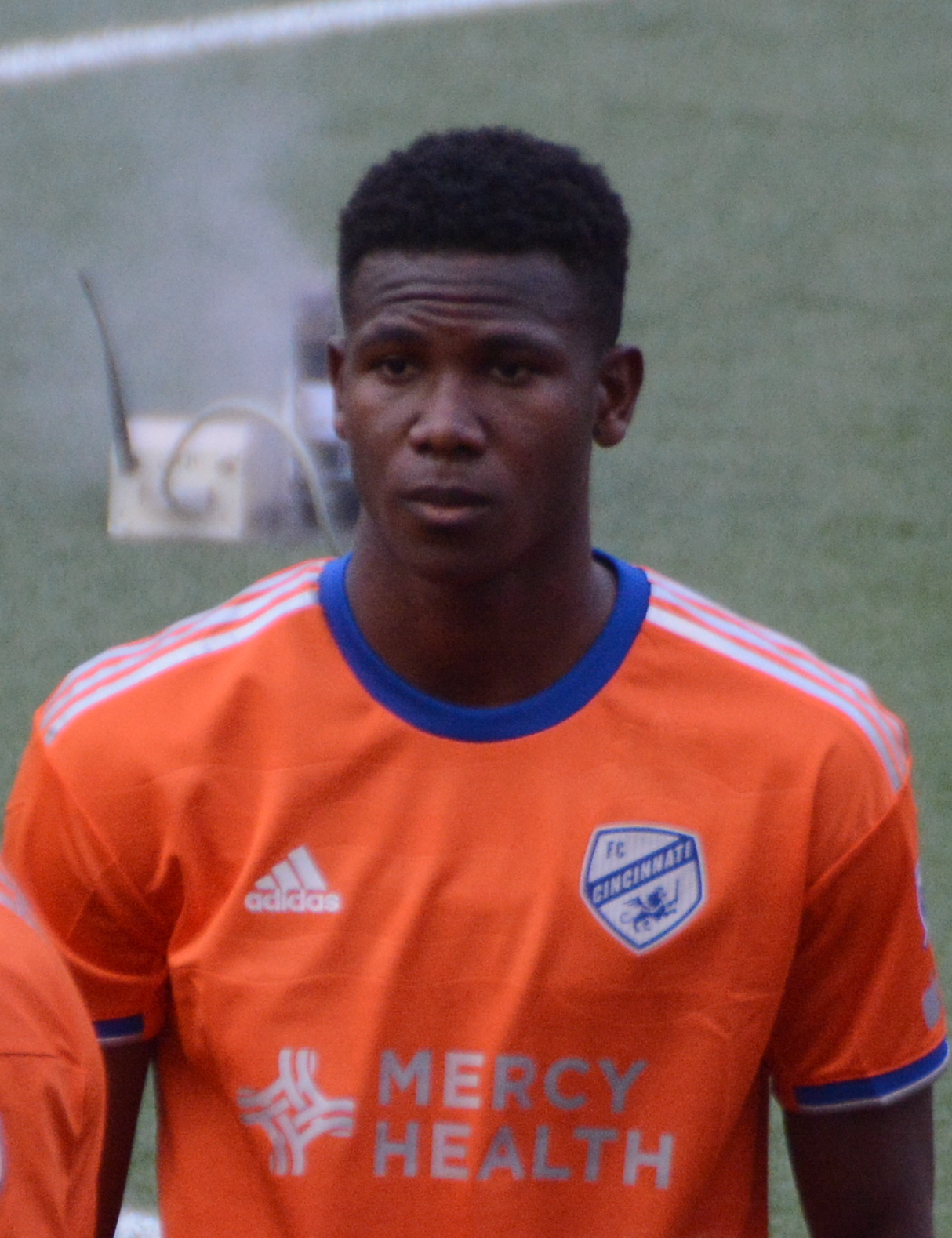
- Mosquera with FC Cincinnati in 2023

Personal information
- Full name: Yerson Mosquera Valdelamar
- Date of birth: 2 May 2001 (age 25)
- Place of birth: Apartadó, Colombia
- Height: 1.88 m (6 ft 2 in)
- Position: Centre-back

Team information
- Current team: Wolverhampton Wanderers
- Number: 15

Youth career
- Fundación Elkin Murillo Amor
- Urabá Junior
- –2018: Filandia Fútbol Club
- 2018–2020: Atlético Nacional

Senior career*
Years	Team	Apps	(Gls)
2020–2021	Atlético Nacional	16	(1)
2021–	Wolverhampton Wanderers	32	(0)
2023	→ FC Cincinnati (loan)	26	(2)
2024	→ Villarreal (loan)	16	(2)

International career
2019	Colombia U18	1	(0)
2020	Colombia U20	2	(1)
2023–2024	Colombia	4	(1)
- * Club domestic league appearances and goals as of 24 May 2026

Yerson Mosquera Valdelamar (born 2 May 2001) is a Colombian professional footballer who plays as a centre-back for EFL Championship club Wolverhampton Wanderers and the Colombia national team.

Mosquera made his breakthrough at Atlético Nacional, where he marked his professional debut against River Plate in the Copa Sudamericana in October 2020.

== Club career ==
=== Early career ===
Raised in Nueva Colonia within the municipality of Turbo in Colombia's Antioquia Department, Mosquera began his journey in football at the Fundación Elkin Murillo Amor (later renamed for Nayo Murillo after being taken over by Jhon Jairo Murillo) founded by his uncle Elkin Murillo, before joining Urabá Junior and later returning to his uncle's amateur club, Filandia Fútbol Club. Although now a defender, he was deployed as both a forward and winger as a young child, playing as a defensive midfielder at the age of 11 before moving to centre-back.

He joined the youth setup of Atlético Nacional in 2018, having been identified by a club scout during the 2018 Torneo de las Américas in Cali while playing for Filandia, and after successes with youth teams in 2018 and 2019, made his debut for the first team in the January 2020 edition of the Florida Cup. Mosquera made his professional debut for the club in October, where despite being sent off in a Copa Sudamericana game against River Plate, his impressive performance was rewarded with his continued integration in Nacional's first-team squad in the following months, and he scored his first professional goal in a 3–2 away win against Alianza Petrolera on 11 November.

=== Wolverhampton Wanderers ===
On 17 June 2021, Mosquera joined Premier League side Wolverhampton Wanderers on a five-year deal, having been on the verge of signing for Club Brugge. After sustaining an injury in pre season, Mosquera would make his debut and start for Wolves in third round EFL Cup against Tottenham Hotspur. However, only nine minutes into that game, Mosquera picked up a hamstring injury and was subbed off. He underwent surgery, being sidelined until January 2022.

On 2 February 2023, Mosquera joined Major League Soccer side FC Cincinnati on loan until 30 June with an option to extend until the end of the year. On 25 November, Mosquera scored a stoppage time winner in the Eastern Conference semi-finals against Philadelphia Union.

On 23 January 2024, Wolverhampton Wanderers sent Mosquera on loan to La Liga club Villarreal until the end of the 2023–24 season. On 17 August, Mosquera made his Premier League debut in the first match of the 2024–25 season against Arsenal. During the match, he was involved in two altercations where he pinned down Arsenal's Kai Havertz by the throat, and grabbed the buttocks of Gabriel Jesus. The next week, at home against Chelsea, Mosquera was shown a yellow card after he took down Moisés Caicedo in the 71st minute. A month later, on 21 September, he sustained an ACL injury during an away match against Aston Villa at Villa Park, which would force him to miss the rest of the season.

== International career ==
Mosquera is a Colombian youth international was called up to train with the senior squad in February 2021. He was called up to play with the Colombian under-18 team in the 2019 SBS Cup, and was a starter in two of three matches during a championship-winning run. He earned his first call-up to the under-20s in October 2019, and having scored one goal in two appearances with the under-20s in December 2020, is also expected to be called up for the 2021 South American U-20 Championship.

On 12 October 2023, he made his international debut for Colombia in a 2–2 draw against Uruguay, coming on in the 90th minute for Santiago Arias. On 10 September 2024, Mosquera scored his first international goal against Argentina, which led to a 2–1 win for La Sele.

== Style of play ==
Mosquera is considered a strong, quick defender, as well as a "complete" centre-back endowed with great aerial ability, which allows him to win the vast majority of his defensive duels. He is highly involved in most of his team's defensive actions, and is comparable to Rúben Dias on the ball and Wesley Fofana out of possession, with long passing ability and physical attributes similar to fellow Colombian centre-back Yerry Mina and pace and acceleration akin to that of Davinson Sánchez.

== Personal life ==
Mosquera is the nephew of former Colombia national team striker Elkin Murillo, whose club he played for as a child. Nicknamed "Ye" as a child and at Urabá, and "Yerri" at Atlético Nacional, Mosquera is one of ten siblings in his family (including a foster brother). His father, Jesús Adán Mosquera, is a banana plantation worker, while his maternal great uncle Agustín Julio was a Colombia national team goalkeeper. Two of his cousins, Daniel Valdelamar and Gustavo Cañizalez, also had short-lived careers within the Colombian top-flight.

== Career statistics ==
=== Club ===
As of match played 24 May 2026

Appearances and goals by club, season and competition
Club	Season	League			National cup (Note: Includes Copa Colombia, U.S. Open Cup, FA Cup)		League cup (Note: Includes EFL Cup)		Continental		Other		Total	
Club	Season	Division	Apps	Goals	Apps	Goals	Apps	Goals	Apps	Goals	Apps	Goals	Apps	Goals
Atlético Nacional	2020	Categoría Primera A	4	1	2	0	—		1 (Note: Appearance in Copa Sudamericana)	0	—		7	1
Atlético Nacional	2021	Categoría Primera A	12	0	—		—		7 (Note: Appearances in Copa Libertadores)	0	—		19	0
Atlético Nacional	Total		16	1	2	0	—		8	0	—		26	1
Wolverhampton Wanderers	2021–22	Premier League	0	0	0	0	1	0	—		—		1	0
Wolverhampton Wanderers	2022–23	Premier League	—		—		—		—		—		0	0
Wolverhampton Wanderers	2024–25	Premier League	5	0	0	0	0	0	—		—		5	0
Wolverhampton Wanderers	2025–26	Premier League	27	0	2	0	2	0	—		—		31	0
Wolverhampton Wanderers	Total		32	0	2	0	3	0	—		—		37	0
FC Cincinnati (loan)	2023	Major League Soccer	26	2	3	0	—		—		6 (Note: Two appearances in Leagues Cup, four appearances and one goal in MLS Cup playoffs)	1	35	3
Villarreal (loan)	2023–24	La Liga	16	2	—		—		2 (Note: Appearances in UEFA Europa League)	1	—		18	3
Career total			90	5	7	0	3	0	10	1	6	1	116	7

=== International ===
Appearances and goals by national team and year
National team	Year	Apps	Goals
Colombia	2023	3	0
Colombia	2024	1	1
Total		4	1

Scores and results list Colombia's goal tally first, score column indicates score after each Mosquera goal.

List of international goals scored by Yerson Mosquera
No.	Date	Venue	Cap	Opponent	Score	Result	Competition
1	10 September 2024	Estadio Metropolitano, Barranquilla, Colombia	4	Argentina	1–0	2–1	2026 FIFA World Cup qualification

== Honours ==
FC Cincinnati

- Supporters' Shield: 2023
