= Malik Pinto =

American soccer player (born 2002)

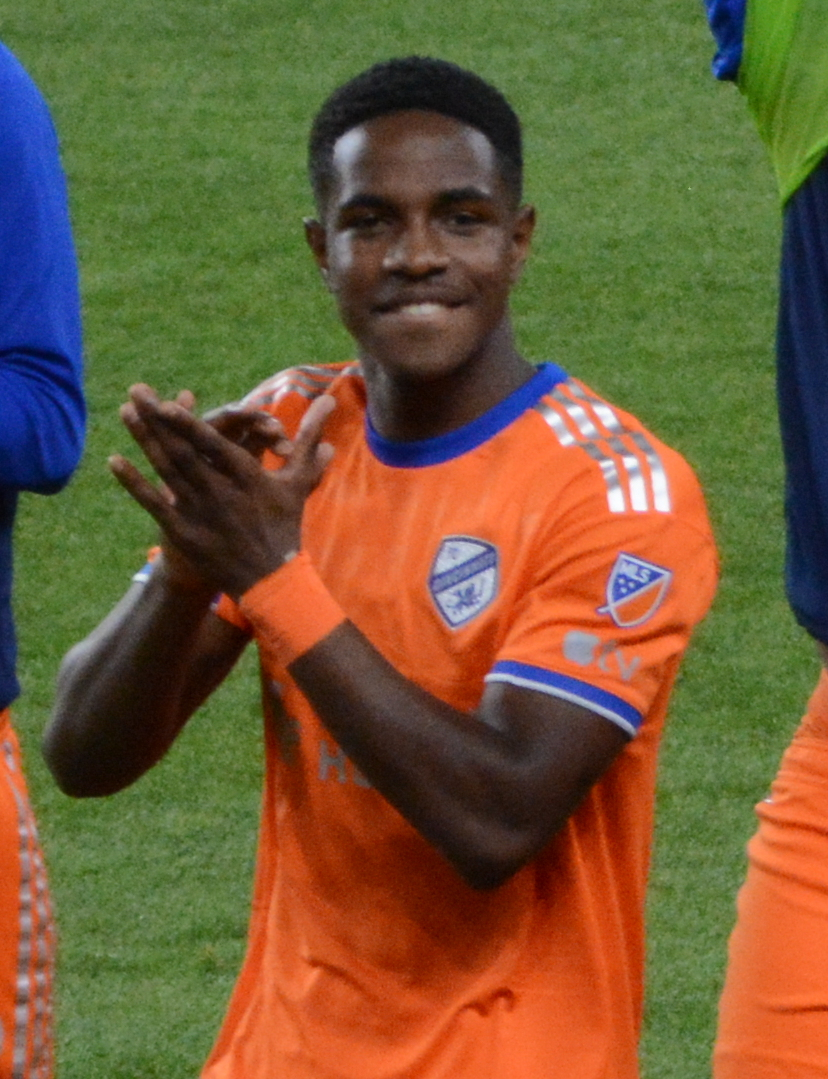
- Pinto with FC Cincinnati in 2023

Personal information
- Full name: Malik Pinto
- Date of birth: August 9, 2002 (age 24)
- Place of birth: Durham, North Carolina, United States
- Height: 5 ft 11 in (1.80 m)
- Position: Defensive midfielder

Team information
- Current team: Brooklyn FC
- Number: 5

Youth career
- 2015–2020: North Carolina Fusion
- 2020–2021: FC Cincinnati

College career
Years	Team	Apps	(Gls)
2020–2022	Princeton Tigers	34	(2)

Senior career*
Years	Team	Apps	(Gls)
2023–2024	FC Cincinnati 2	13	(3)
2023–2024	FC Cincinnati	33	(0)
2025–2026	Colorado Rapids 2	24	(4)
2025	→ Orange County SC (loan)	10	(0)
2026–	Brooklyn FC	24	(2)
- * Club domestic league appearances and goals as of November 4, 2026

Malik Pinto (born August 9, 2002) is an American professional soccer player who plays as a midfielder for USL Championship side Brooklyn FC.

== Biography ==
Pinto was born on August 9, 2002, in Durham, North Carolina to Meleata and Hassan Pinto. He grew up in a sports-focused family; his father Hassan played soccer for the North Carolina Tar Heels, his mother Meleata played for Tar Heels softball, his sister Brianna plays in the National Women's Soccer League, and his brother Hassan played in the USL Championship. He played youth soccer with the North Carolina Fusion academy for five seasons, and attended Charles E. Jordan High School.

In August 2019, Pinto committed to enroll at Princeton University in 2020 and join the Princeton Tigers men's soccer team. However, after the 2020 NCAA season was cancelled due to the COVID-19 pandemic, Pinto joined the academy of FC Cincinnati, a Major League Soccer club, where he played for the under-19 team. He returned to the Princeton team for the 2021 and 2022 seasons. Across his two-year career with the Tigers, Pinto played in all 34 games (starting in 30 of them), scoring 2 goals and earning 6 assists. He was named to the All-Ivy League second team in 2021, and was an All-Ivy honorable mention in 2022.

On January 6, 2023, FC Cincinnati announced they had signed Pinto to a contract through the end of 2024, with options for 2025 and 2026. He made his professional debut on March 25, 2023, in a 1–0 road win against Nashville SC. FC Cincinnati was down several players in midfield, with Junior Moreno and Marco Angulo on international duty and Yuya Kubo injured, and thus turned to Pinto to play as a starter.

Pinto was noted in local media for a strong debut performance, as he completed 22 of 22 passes successfully and notched one clearance, one blocked shot, and one tackle. Head coach Pat Noonan spoke positively of his performance, saying, "You could see just the IQ for a player that is usually not in that position to come in and help us connect the right passes."

On September 5, 2025, Colorado loaned Pinto to USL Championship club Orange County SC for the remainder of the 2025 season.

== Honors ==
FC Cincinnati

- Supporters' Shield: 2023
