= Sérgio Santos (footballer, born 1994) =

Brazilian footballer (born 1994)

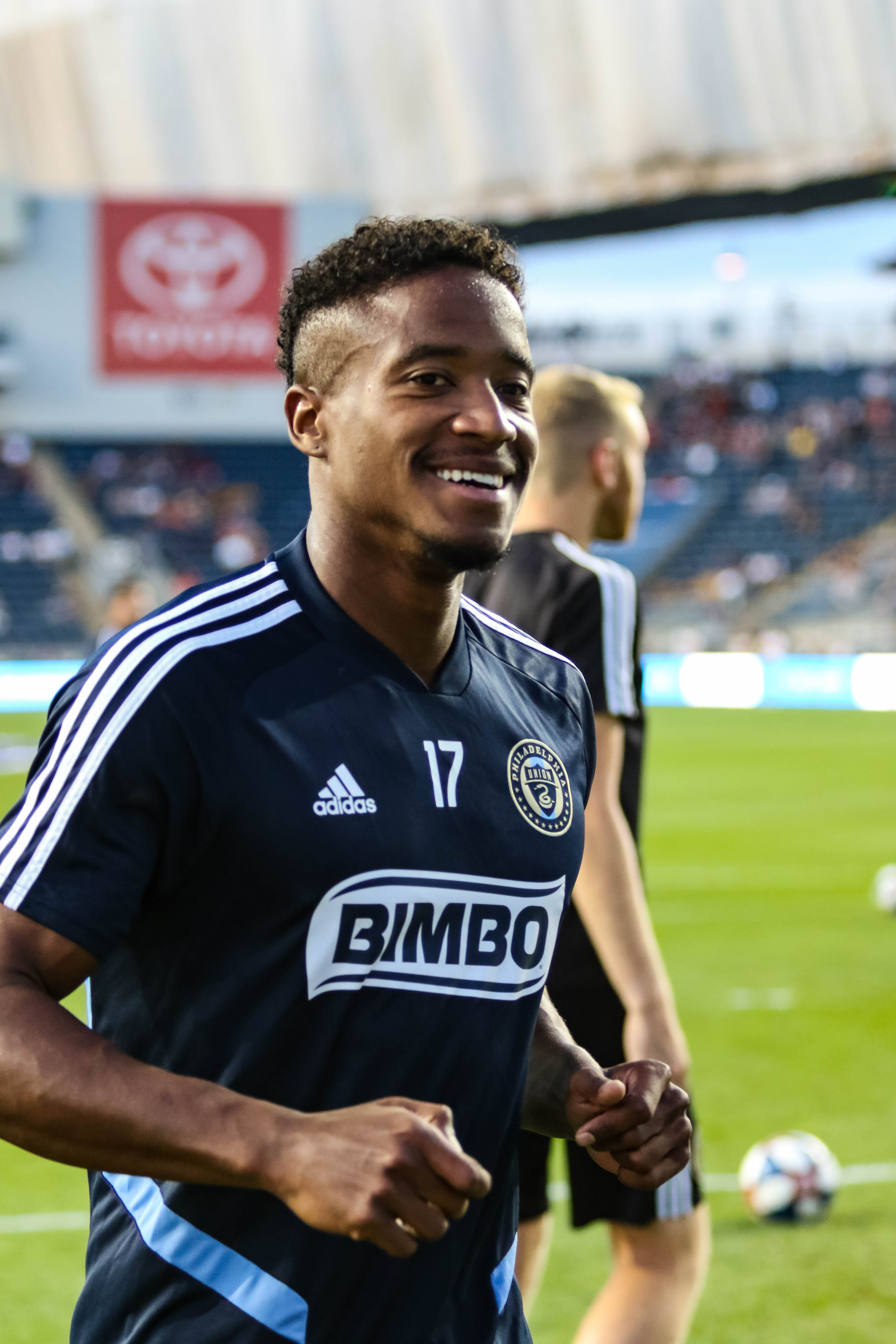
- Santos with the Philadelphia Union

Personal information
- Full name: Sérgio Henrique Santos Gomes
- Date of birth: 4 September 1994 (age 32)
- Place of birth: Belo Horizonte, Brazil
- Height: 1.80 m (5 ft 11 in)
- Position: Forward

Team information
- Current team: Atlanta United
- Number: 19

Youth career
- –2013: América Mineiro
- 2013–2015: Audax Italiano

Senior career*
Years	Team	Apps	(Gls)
2015–2018	Audax Italiano	72	(19)
2019–2022	Philadelphia Union	76	(19)
2019	→ Bethlehem Steel (loan)	2	(1)
2022–2025	FC Cincinnati	79	(8)
2025	Houston Dynamo	2	(1)
2026–	Atlanta United	9	(0)
- * Club domestic league appearances and goals as of 13:21, 15 November 2026 (UTC)

Sérgio Henrique Santos Gomes (born 4 September 1994) is a Brazilian professional footballer who plays as forward for Atlanta United in Major League Soccer.

== Early life ==
Santos was born in Belo Horizonte, Brazil. Growing up in the Ana Lucía neighborhood of Belo Horizonte, Santos worked as a bricklayer and construction worker to help his family. Santos joined América Mineiro at age nine beginning his development into a professional.

== Playing career ==
=== Audax Italiano ===
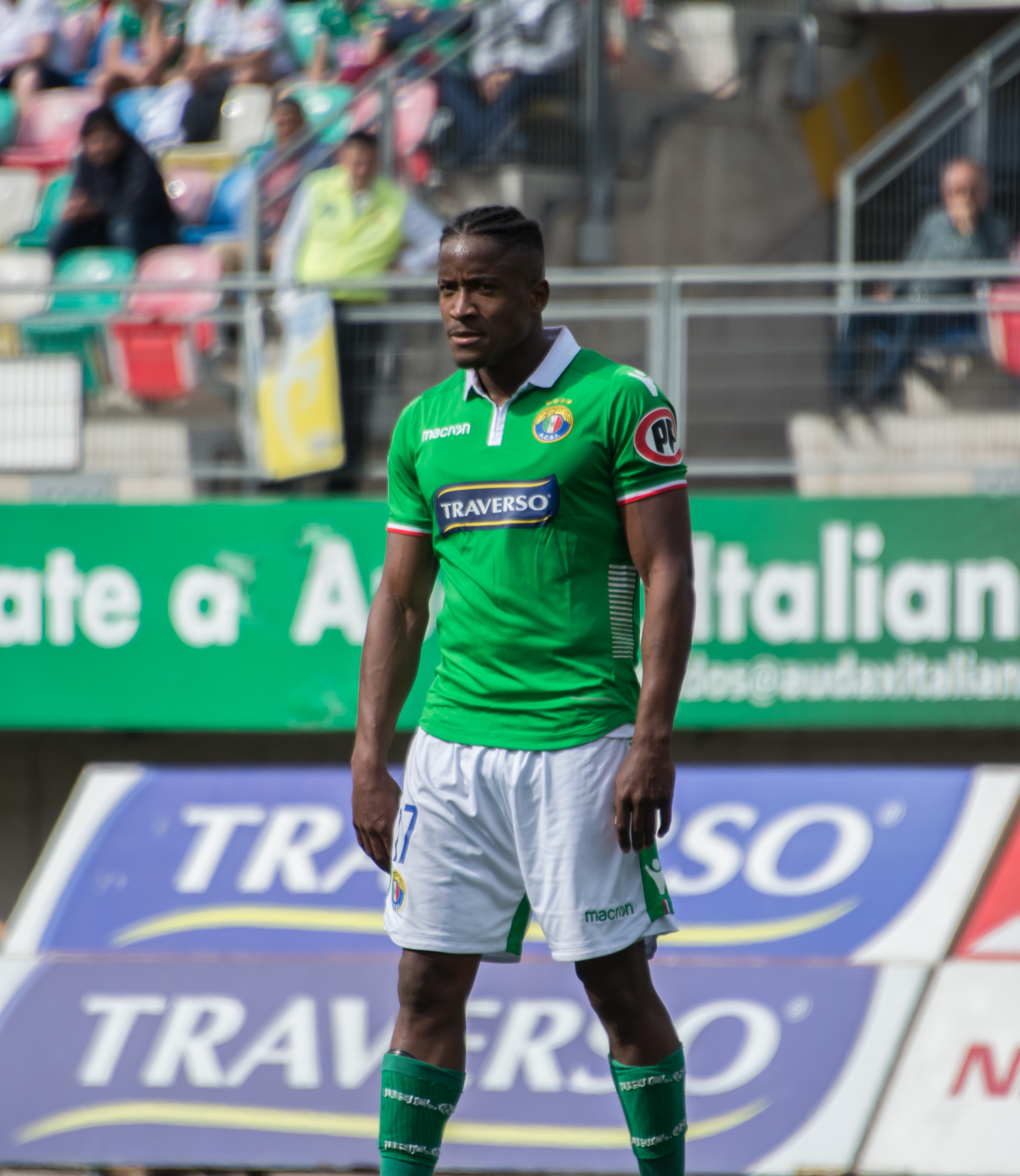
Santos playing for Audax Italiano versus Deportes Iquique

In 2014, Santos began exploring professional options in Chile. After trying negotiations with Palestino and Magallanes, he signed with Audax Italiano. In August 2018, Santos signed a contract extension with Italiano through mid-2020. Santos scored nine goals in 16 league appearances during the 2018 season for Audax and was the club's leading scorer. He helped the club qualify for the 2018 Copa Sudamericana and reach the Copa Chile final, where the side finished as runners-up to Palestino.

=== Philadelphia Union ===
On 14 December 2018, signed with Philadelphia Union competing in Major League Soccer. The signing was completed for approximately $500,000 transfer fee and as a TAM-level player. After a slow start due to injuries, Santos scored his first two goals for the Union on May 5 versus New England Revolution in a 6–1 victory. Santos would finish his first season with four goals and one assist.

While the 2020 season was disrupted by COVID-19 pandemic, Santos found his footing with the Union scoring the first goal of the season against Los Angeles FC. In October during a top of the table match-up, Santos scored his first professional hat trick against Toronto FC (the fourth in Union history); earning him MLS Player of the Week honors. The season would end with the Union earning their first trophy in club history, the 2020 Supporters' Shield, leading the team with eight goals.

=== FC Cincinnati ===
On 8 July 2022, Santos was acquired from the Philadelphia Union by FC Cincinnati, joining the club in exchange for $300,000 in allocation money, with an additional $625,000 dependent on performance-based metrics or contract conditions being met. Philadelphia will receive a percentage of a future trade if Santos is traded to another MLS club. Santos was waived by Cincinnati on 22 August 2025.

=== Houston Dynamo ===
On 2 September 2025, Santos joined Houston Dynamo with a club option for 2026. Houston declined his contract option following the 2025 season.

=== Atlanta United ===
On 18 February 2026, Santos was signed by Atlanta United for the 2026 season.

== Career statistics ==
=== Club ===
As of match played 7 August 2025

Appearances and goals by club, season and competition
Club	Season	League			Playoffs (Note: Includes MLS Cup playoffs)		National cup (Note: Includes Copa Chile and U.S. Open Cup)		League cup (Note: Includes Leagues Cup)		Continental		Other		Total	
Club	Season	Division	Apps	Goals	Apps	Goals	Apps	Goals	Apps	Goals	Apps	Goals	Apps	Goals	Apps	Goals
Audax Italiano	2014–15	Primera División	1	0	–		2	0	–		–		–		3	0
Audax Italiano	2015–16	Primera División	17	3	–		7	4	–		–		2 (Note: Appearances in 2016 Liguilla Pre Libertadores de Chile)	0	26	7
Audax Italiano	2016–17	Primera División	24	3	–		4	1	–		–		–		28	4
Audax Italiano	2017	Primera División	14	4	–		–		–		–		–		14	4
Audax Italiano	2018	Primera División	16	9	–		8	5	–		1 (Note: Appearance in Copa Sudamericana)	1	–		25	15
Audax Italiano	Total		72	19	–		21	10	–		1	1	2	0	96	30
Philadelphia Union	2019	MLS	17	4	2	0	1	0	–		–		–		20	4
Philadelphia Union	2020	MLS	22	8	1	0	–		–		–		2 (Note: Appearances in the MLS is Back Tournament knockout rounds)	3	25	11
Philadelphia Union	2021	MLS	26	6	2	0	–		–		4 (Note: Appearances in CONCACAF Champions League/Cup)	0	–		32	6
Philadelphia Union	2022	MLS	11	1	–		1	0	–		–		–		12	1
Philadelphia Union	Total		76	19	5	0	2	0	–		4	0	2	3	89	22
Bethlehem Steel FC (loan)	2019	USL Championship	2	1	–		–		–		–		–		2	1
FC Cincinnati	2022	MLS	8	0	2	0	–		1 (Note: Appearance in 2022 Leagues Cup Showcase)	0	–		–		11	0
FC Cincinnati	2023	MLS	25	4	3	0	2	0	1	0	–		–		31	4
FC Cincinnati	2024	MLS	28	3	3	0	–		4	1	4	1	–		39	5
FC Cincinnati	2025	MLS	18	1	–		–		1	0	2	0	–		21	1
FC Cincinnati	Total		79	8	8	0	2	0	7	1	6	1	–		102	10
Career total			229	47	13	0	25	10	7	1	11	2	4	3	289	63

== Honours ==
Philadelphia Union

- Supporters' Shield: 2020

FC Cincinnati

- Supporters' Shield: 2023
