= Obinna Nwobodo =

Nigerian footballer (born 1996)

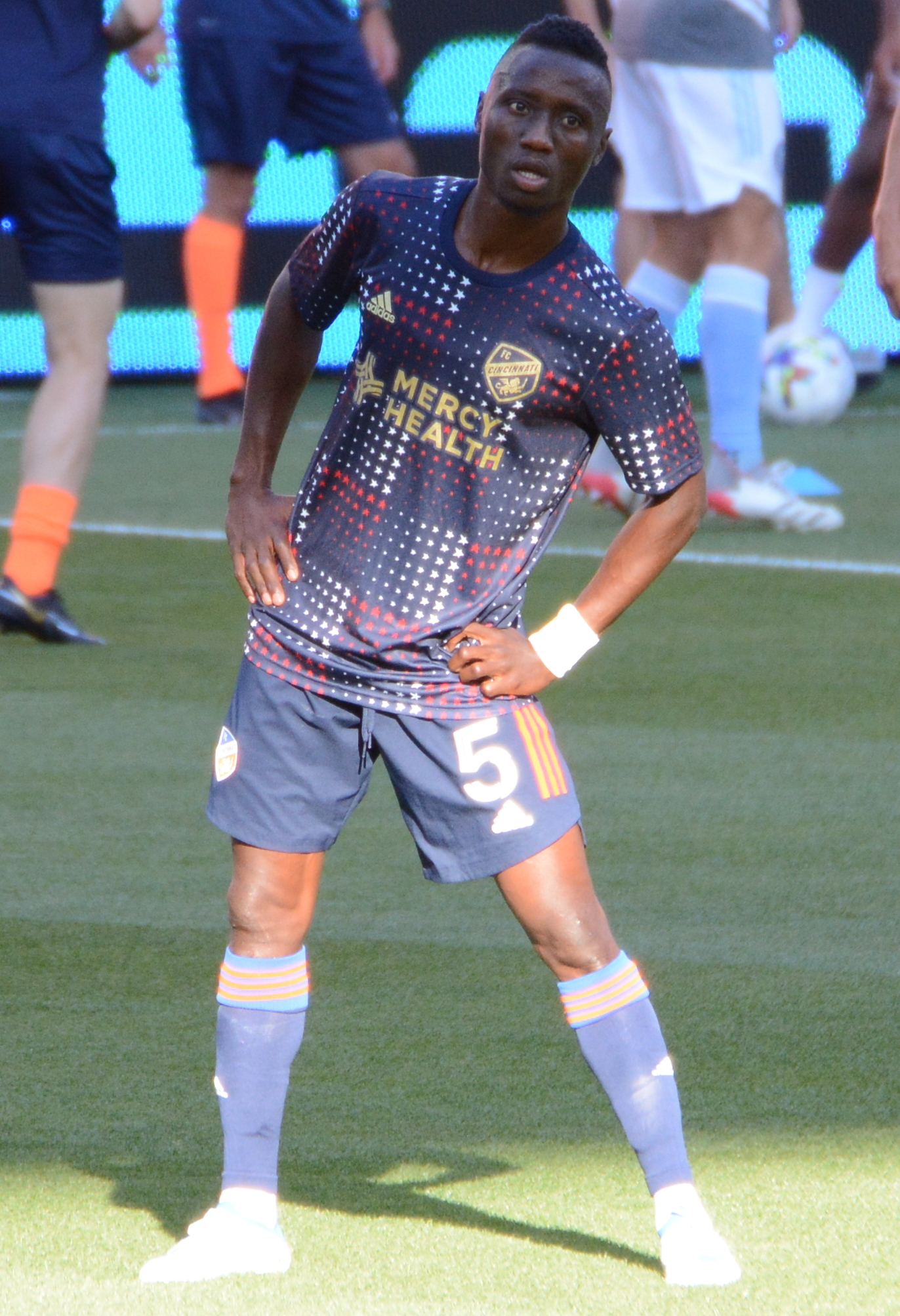
- Nwobodo with FC Cincinnati in 2022

Personal information
- Full name: Obinna Emmanuel Nwobodo
- Date of birth: 29 November 1996 (age 29)
- Place of birth: Enugu, Nigeria
- Height: 1.79 m (5 ft 10 in)
- Position: Midfielder

Team information
- Current team: FC Cincinnati
- Number: 5

Youth career
- FC Inter Enugu

Senior career*
Years	Team	Apps	(Gls)
2013–2015	FC Inter Enugu		
2015–2017	Enugu Rangers	45	(9)
2017–2020	Újpest	93	(10)
2020–2022	Göztepe	60	(0)
2022–	FC Cincinnati	126	(2)

International career
2015	Nigeria U20	5	(2)
- * Club domestic league appearances and goals as of 02:41, 9 November 2026 (UTC)

Obinna Emmanuel Nwobodo (born 29 November 1996) is a Nigerian professional footballer who plays as a midfielder for Major League Soccer club FC Cincinnati.

== Club career ==
=== Early career ===
Nwobodo started his youth career with FC Inter Enugu while completing his high school education in Enugu State, Nigeria. He was scouted while representing his high school in a football competition and later played for FC Inter in the Nigeria Nationwide League (NNL) and State FA cup. During a preseason friendly between Enugu Rangers and FC Inter Enugu, he put in a man-of-the-match performance that troubled the six-time Nigerian league champions, who promptly negotiated a deal to have him play professionally for them during the 2015–16 league season.

=== Enugu Rangers ===
After signing for Enugu Rangers, Obinna was promoted straight into the first team within a matter of weeks. He was handed his preferred number 8 shirt and registered as a central midfielder. Moving straight into the starting eleven, Nwobodo started majority of the early season games, making his league debut in the season opener against Nigerian league giants Kano Pillars. He remained in the starting eleven afterwards with his playmaking and distribution helping take Rangers to the very top of the table during the 2016 season.

Nwobodo was instrumental to Enugu Rangers's eventual title triumph, providing half of the assists for Chisom Egbuchulam's 16 goals and ending Rangers' 32-year wait for a 7th league title. On matchday 37 against Ikorodu United, he scored a goal-of-the-season contender; having sighted the Ikorodu United goalkeeper off his line, he scored with a lofted chip shot from almost 40 yards out. The tally was later increased to two when Nwobodo again made a spectacular run down the right and then delivered a perfect cross for Egbuchulam to simply tap home. That man-of-the-match performance cemented his place in the team of the season. He contributed 7 goals and 10 assists to finish as arguably the best midfielder in the league in his first professional season in the top flight of Nigerian football. In December 2016, Nwobodo was presented with the best player award for his performance during the 2016 season by Enugu Rangers management.

=== FC Cincinnati ===
On 13 April 2022, Nwobodo signed for Major League Soccer club FC Cincinnati as a Designated Player. He signed a contract through the 2024 season, with a club option for 2025.

== Career statistics ==
As of match played 7 November 2026

Appearances and goals by club, season and competition
Club	Season	League			National cup (Note: Includes Magyar Kupa, Turkish Cup, and U.S. Open Cup)		League cup (Note: Includes Leagues Cup)		Continental		Other		Total	
Club	Season	Division	Apps	Goals	Apps	Goals	Apps	Goals	Apps	Goals	Apps	Goals	Apps	Goals
Enugu Rangers	2016	NPFL	31	7	—		—		—		—		31	7
Enugu Rangers	2017	NPFL	14	2	—		—		3 (Note: One appearance in CAF Champions League, two appearances in CAF Confederation Cup)	0	—		17	2
Enugu Rangers	Total		45	9	—		—		3	0	—		48	9
Újpest	2017–18	Nemzeti Bajnokság I	30	3	10	1	—		—		—		40	4
Újpest	2018–19	Nemzeti Bajnokság I	27	4	3	2	—		3 (Note: Appearance in UEFA Europa League)	1	—		33	7
Újpest	2019–20	Nemzeti Bajnokság I	32	3	5	1	—		—		—		37	4
Újpest	2020–21	Nemzeti Bajnokság I	4	0	—		—		—		—		4	0
Újpest	Total		93	10	18	4	—		3	1	—		114	15
Göztepe	2020–21	Süper Lig	31	0	1	0	—		—		—		32	0
Göztepe	2021–22	Süper Lig	29	0	3	0	—		—		—		32	0
Göztepe	Total		60	0	4	0	—		—		—		64	10
FC Cincinnati	2022	MLS	24	0	—		1 (Note: Appearance in 2022 Leagues Cup Showcase)	0	—		2 (Note: Appearances in MLS Cup playoffs)	0	27	0
FC Cincinnati	2023	MLS	30	2	4	0	3	0	—		3	0	40	2
FC Cincinnati	2024	MLS	30	0	—		4	0	3 (Note: Appearances in CONCACAF Champions Cup)	0	3	0	40	0
FC Cincinnati	2025	MLS	14	0	—		—		3	0	4	0	21	0
FC Cincinnati	2026	MLS	28	0	—		3	0	4	0	—		35	0
FC Cincinnati	Total		126	2	4	0	11	0	10	0	12	0	163	2
Career total			324	21	26	4	11	0	16	1	12	0	389	36

== Honours ==
Enugu Rangers

- Nigeria Professional Football League: 2016

FC Cincinnati

- Supporters' Shield: 2023

Nigeria U20

- African U-20 Championship: 2015
