= Álvaro Barreal =

Argentine footballer (born 2000)

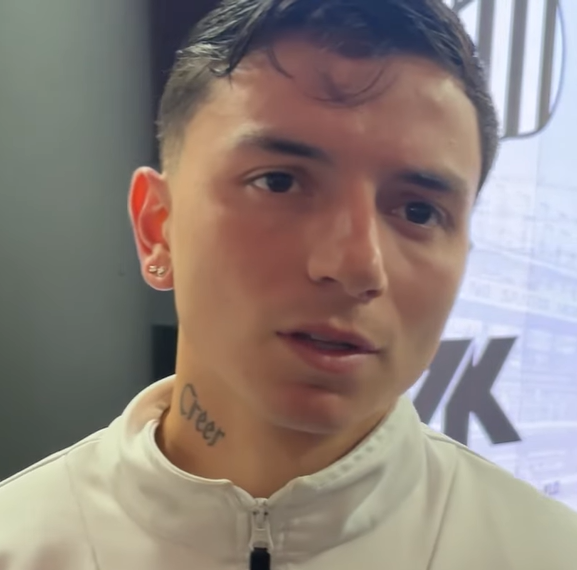
- Barreal in 2025

Personal information
- Full name: Álvaro Martín Barreal
- Date of birth: 17 August 2000 (age 26)
- Place of birth: Buenos Aires, Argentina
- Height: 1.70 m (5 ft 7 in)
- Position: Winger

Team information
- Current team: Santos
- Number: 22

Youth career
- Vélez Sarsfield

Senior career*
Years	Team	Apps	(Gls)
2018–2020	Vélez Sarsfield	18	(1)
2020–2025	FC Cincinnati	104	(13)
2024	→ Cruzeiro (loan)	31	(2)
2025	→ Santos (loan)	36	(9)
2026–	Santos	35	(6)

International career
2018	Argentina U20	5	(2)
- * Club domestic league appearances and goals as of 17:29, 19 November 2026 (UTC)

Álvaro Martín Barreal (born 17 August 2000) is an Argentine professional footballer who plays as a left winger for Brazilian club Santos.

== Club career ==
=== Vélez Sarsfield ===
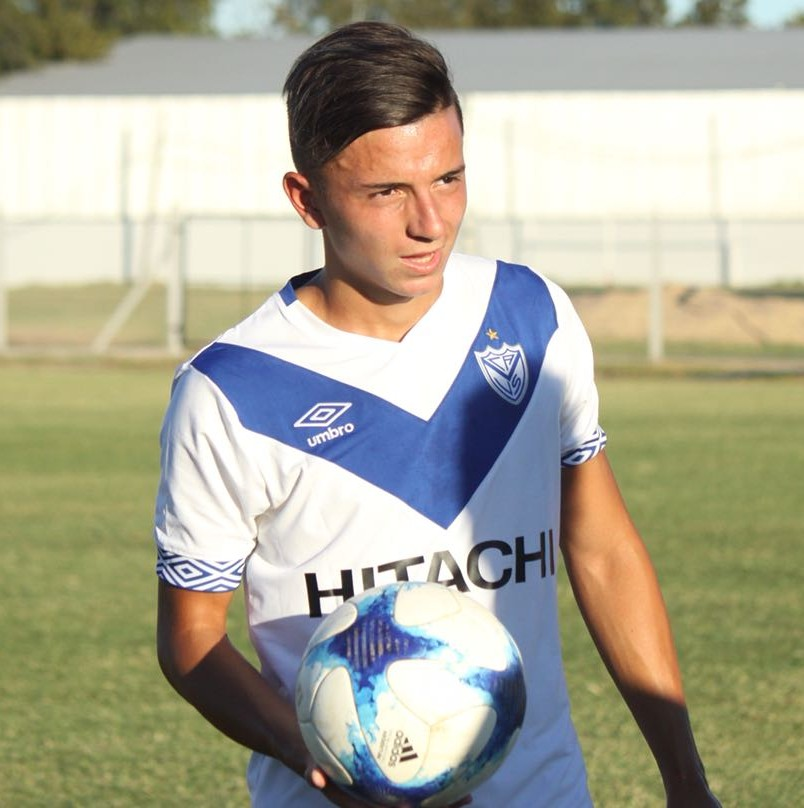
Barreal as a Vélez Sarsfield player in 2020

Barreal began his career with Vélez Sarsfield. Gabriel Heinze promoted the midfielder into the club's first-team squad at the beginning of 2018–19, selecting him for his professional debut on 2 September at La Bombonera against Boca Juniors; he was substituted on for Lucas Robertone with thirty-two minutes remaining. He netted his first goal on 3 February 2019 against River Plate.

=== FC Cincinnati ===
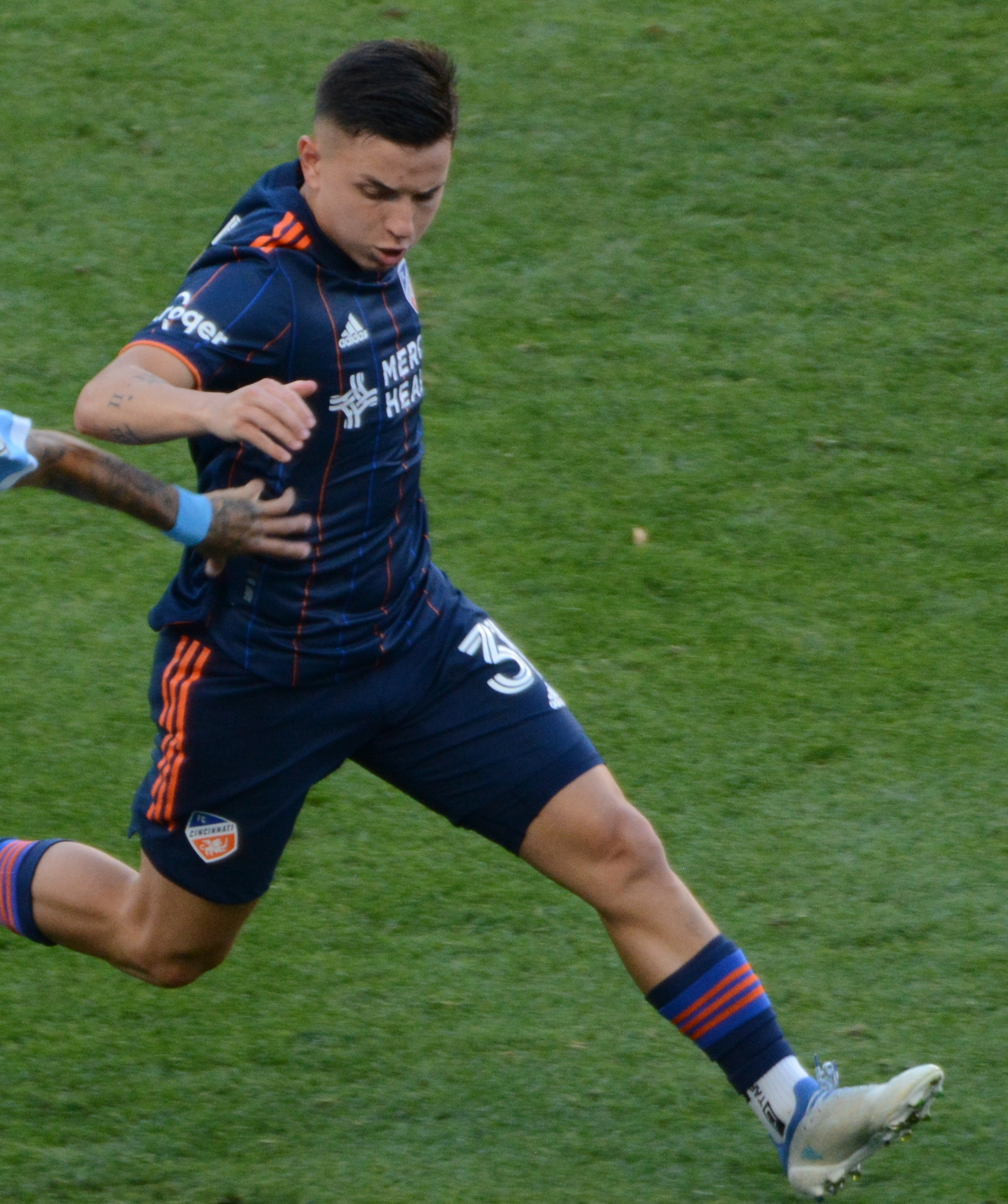
Barreal during a 2022 FC Cincinnati match

On 2 September 2020, Barreal signed for Major League Soccer side FC Cincinnati. He signed a three-year contract with a club option for a fourth year. Reports out of Argentina listed the transfer fee in the range of $1.5 to 1.7 million for 75 percent of the player's rights, with Vélez Sarsfield retaining 25 percent of any future sale. Also noted was the potential of $250,000 additional for a set number of appearances. Barreal made his debut on 7 October in a 3–0 defeat away to the Philadelphia Union at Subaru Park, having replaced Frankie Amaya early in the second half. Four further appearances, all as a starter, arrived in his first season with the American club.

In September 2023, Barreal was nominated for the prestigious FIFA Puskás Award for his 71st-minute goal scored against Pittsburgh Riverhounds SC in the U.S. Open Cup Quarterfinals. Barreal joined 10 other players on the shortlist for the world's "most beautiful goal" of the year. He was the fourth active MLS player to be nominated for the award, and the first since a 2018 goal by Zlatan Ibrahimović for LA Galaxy.

==== Loan to Cruzeiro ====
On 1 March 2024, FC Cincinnati announced a loan with purchase option on an undisclosed fee to Cruzeiro through December 2024. He was regularly used for the club during his spell, scoring twice in 42 appearances before departing in December.

=== Santos ===
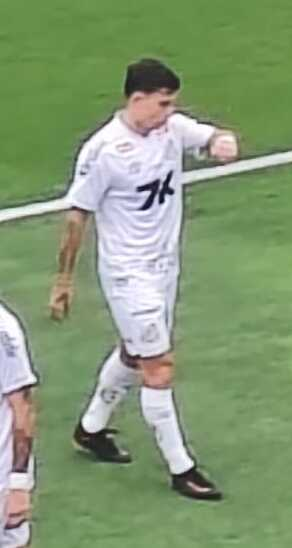
Barreal in action for Santos in 2025

On 6 February 2025, Santos announced the signing of Barreal on a one-year loan deal, with a buyout clause. After nursing an injury, he made his club debut seventeen days later, replacing Yeferson Soteldo late into a 3–0 away win over Inter de Limeira.

Barreal scored nine goals for Peixe in the 2025 Série A, being the club's top scorer in the competition. On 17 December 2025, FC Cincinnati announced his permanent transfer to the club, after certain conditions over an obligatory purchase were met.

== International career ==
Barreal represented the Argentina U20s at the 2018 COTIF Tournament in Spain. He scored two goals in five games, as Argentina won the tournament.

Scouts from the Argentina senior national team visited two FC Cincinnati games in 2023 to assess him for a potential call up to the senior team.

== Career statistics ==
As of 19 November 2026

Appearances and goals by club, season and competition
Club	Season	League			National cup (Note: Includes Copa Argentina, US Open Cup, Copa do Brasil)		League cup (Note: Includes Copa de la Superliga and Leagues Cup)		Continental		State league (Note: Includes Campeonato Mineiro, Campeonato Paulista)		Other (Note: Includes MLS Cup playoffs)		Total	
Club	Season	Division	Apps	Goals	Apps	Goals	Apps	Goals	Apps	Goals	Apps	Goals	Apps	Goals	Apps	Goals
Vélez Sarsfield	2018–19	Argentine Primera División	10	1	1	0	2	0	—		—		—		13	1
Vélez Sarsfield	2019–20	Argentine Primera División	5	0	—		—		—		—		—		5	0
Vélez Sarsfield	Total		15	1	1	0	2	0	—		—		—		18	1
FC Cincinnati	2020	Major League Soccer	5	0	—		—		—		—		—		5	0
FC Cincinnati	2021	Major League Soccer	33	3	—		—		—		—		—		33	3
FC Cincinnati	2022	Major League Soccer	32	5	2	3	1 (Note: Appearance(s) in the 2022 Leagues Cup Showcase)	0	—		—		2	0	37	8
FC Cincinnati	2023	Major League Soccer	34	5	5	1	3	0	—		—		4	2	46	8
FC Cincinnati	Total		104	13	7	4	4	0	—		—		6	2	121	19
Cruzeiro (loan)	2024	Série A	28	2	—		—		11 (Note: Appearance(s) in Copa Sudamericana)	0	3	0	—		42	2
Santos	2025	Série A	34	9	1	0	—		—		2	0	—		37	9
Santos	2026	Série A	28	5	6	0	—		8	0	7	1	—		49	6
Santos	Total		62	14	7	0	—		8	0	9	1	—		86	15
Career total			209	30	15	4	6	0	19	0	12	1	6	2	267	37

== Honours ==
Argentina U20

- L'Alcúdia International Football Tournament: 2018

FC Cincinnati

- Supporters' Shield: 2023

Individual

- MLS All-Star: 2023
