= Santiago Arias =

Colombian footballer (born 1992)

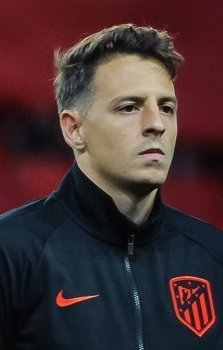
- Arias with Atlético Madrid in 2019

Personal information
- Full name: Santiago Arias Naranjo
- Date of birth: 13 January 1992 (age 34)
- Place of birth: Medellín, Colombia
- Height: 1.78 m (5 ft 10 in)
- Position: Right-back

Team information
- Current team: Independiente
- Number: 4

Youth career
- La Equidad

Senior career*
Years	Team	Apps	(Gls)
2009–2011	La Equidad	27	(0)
2011–2013	Sporting CP	7	(0)
2012–2013	Sporting CP B	28	(1)
2013–2014	Jong PSV	2	(0)
2013–2018	PSV	136	(9)
2018–2022	Atlético Madrid	39	(1)
2020–2021	→ Bayer Leverkusen (loan)	1	(0)
2021–2022	→ Granada (loan)	12	(1)
2023	FC Cincinnati	29	(2)
2024–2026	Bahia	53	(1)
2026–	Independiente	13	(0)

International career^{‡}
2009	Colombia U17	6	(0)
2011	Colombia U20	14	(1)
2013–	Colombia	69	(0)
Medal record
Men's football
Representing Colombia
Copa América
Runner-up	2024 United States
Third place	2016 United States
- * Club domestic league appearances and goals as of 17:34, 6 June 2026 (UTC) ‡ National team caps and goals as of 28 June 2026

Santiago Arias Naranjo (born 13 January 1992) is a Colombian professional footballer who plays as a right-back for Argentine Primera División club Independiente and the Colombia national team.

Arias began his career at La Equidad, before moving to Sporting CP in Portugal in 2011. In 2013 he signed for Dutch side PSV, where he won three Eredivisie titles and two Johan Cruyff Shield trophies, and was named Eredivisie Player of the Year for the 2017–18 season. In 2018 he transferred to Atlético Madrid in Spain, where he won the 2018 UEFA Super Cup, later having loan spells at Bayer Leverkusen and Granada. After a stint with FC Cincinnati in Major League Soccer, where he won the Supporters' Shield in 2023, he joined Bahia in 2024 before signing with Independiente in Argentina in January 2026.

At international level, Arias represented the Colombia U17 and the Colombia U20 teams before making his senior debut in 2013. He has earned over 60 caps and appeared at the 2014, 2018, and 2026 editions of the FIFA World Cup, as well as the Copa América in 2015, 2016 (where Colombia finished third), 2019, and 2024 (where Colombia finished as runners-up).

== Club career ==
=== La Equidad ===
Arias was a youth product of the La Equidad academy. He was moved into the senior squad during 2009 making his professional debut that same year against Deportes Tolima. He soon became a regular for the Bogotá based club and racked up 28 appearances. His notable performances earned him the opportunity to represent his nation at the 2011 FIFA U-20 World Cup hosted in Colombia. After a successful spell at his club and internationally, he soon moved to Portugal to join the ranks of Lisbon team Sporting CP.

=== Sporting CP ===
While representing the U20 national Colombian side in 2011, Arias attracted the scouts of Sporting CP. On 1 July 2011, Arias was ultimately signed by Sporting on a 5-year contract for a transfer free of €300,000. He made his debut in Portugal on 6 November replacing Matías Fernández in the 80th minute against U.D. Leiria. Despite making his first team debut, Arias spent most of his playing time with the B-Squad where he scored a goal in 28 appearances. He occasionally made appearances with the first squad, but never broke in for a permanent spot.

=== PSV ===
In early 2013, Arias was linked to the Dutch club PSV but nothing was finalized. In July 2013, Arias was once again linked to the club where both parties agreed on finalizing a deal. It was then reported that Arias signed a four-year contract and PSV paid Sporting €1.6 million for a package deal including fellow Sporting teammate Stijn Schaars. Upon his arrival, Arias was handed the number 13 shirt. He made his league debut on 3 August, playing a full 90 minutes in a 2–3 away win against ADO Den Haag. He made his first direct contribution for PSV as he scored the opening goal in a 3–2 home win over FC Twente. Arias made 25 league appearances for the 2013–14 Eredivisie with PSV placing fourth thus earning a place in the 2014–15 UEFA Europa League Third qualifying round.

Arias appeared for the first time in a European competition in a match against SKN St. Pölten coming on as a second-half substitute in a match where PSV won 2–3. He then appeared in four group stage matches and played the first leg of the Round of 32 against FC Zenit Saint Petersburg. Subsequent to an injury, Arias was ruled out of the second leg with his team being knocked out 4–0 on aggregate.

Despite an early exit from the Europa League, PSV were crowned 2014–15 Eredivisie thus making the conquest Arias's first European title. It was also the club's first title in eight years.

In the 1–2 Champions League group stage loss against Bayern München, Arias scored the opening goal with a header, which possibly came from an offside position.

He played on 15 April 2018 as PSV beat rivals Ajax 3–0 to clinch the 2017–18 Eredivisie title. The title would be Arias' 5th Dutch trophy in just 5 seasons within the Netherlands. Arias would then be named the Eredivisie Player of the Year, having assisted 6 goals and scoring 3, as well as holding an 82% passing accuracy and winning 134 take ons. He was also named in the league's best XI of the season.

=== Atlético Madrid ===
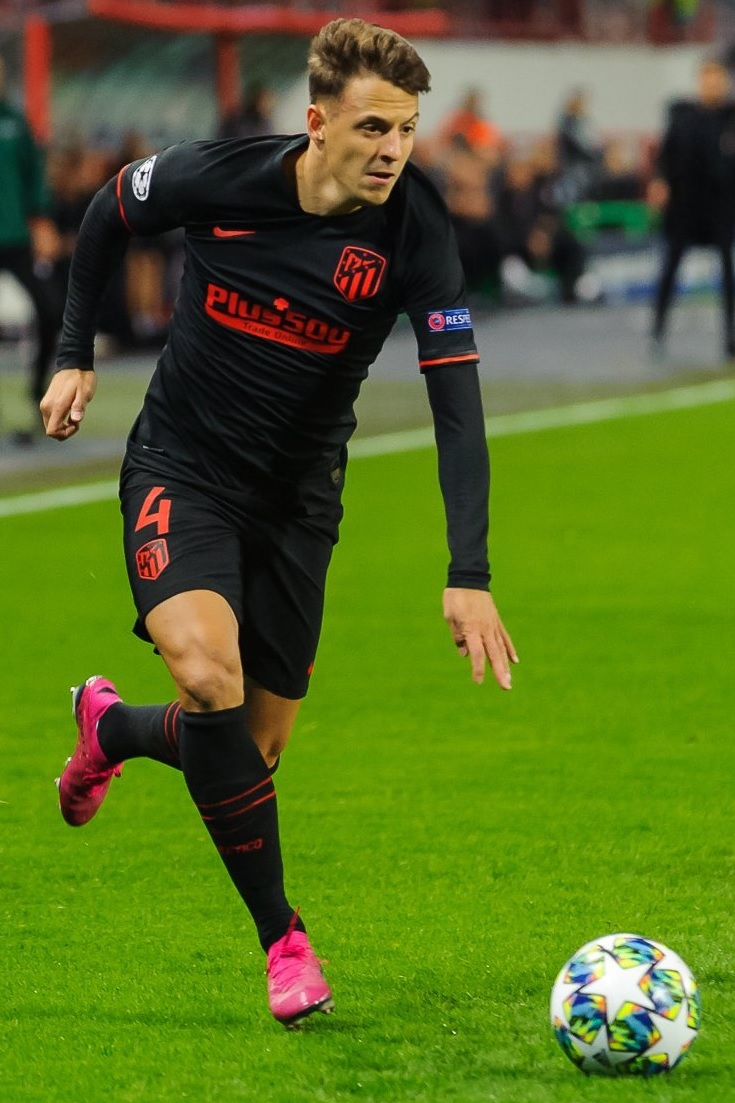
Arias during a match with Atlético Madrid in 2019

On 31 July 2018, it was announced that Arias completed a transfer to Atlético Madrid for a reported transfer fee of £11 million. Upon his arrival, Arias was handed the number 4 shirt.

He made his unofficial debut in friendly against Cagliari replacing Juanfran at the start of the second half. Atlético went on to win the match with Borja Garcés scoring the sole goal. He made his league debut for the club on 1 September, coming on as a substitute for José Giménez in a 2–0 defeat against Celta de Vigo. On 19 January 2019, he scored his first goal for Los Rojiblancos in a 0–3 defeat of SD Huesca.

==== Loan to Bayer Leverkusen and Granada ====
On 24 September 2020, Arias joined Bayer Leverkusen on a season-long loan with an option to buy. A severe injury suffered in October while on international duty, however, cut his Leverkusen career short to a single Bundesliga appearance, sidelining him for the remainder of the season with a fractured fibula and damaged ligaments in his left ankle.

On 30 August 2021, Arias moved to Granada CF on a one-year loan deal. In December 2021, he suffered a hamstring injury, which required surgery, and was operated in January 2022 by surgeon Lasse Lempainen in Turku, Finland.

=== FC Cincinnati ===
On 9 February 2023, Arias joined Major League Soccer club FC Cincinnati on a one‑year contract with an option for 2024, signing as a free agent after leaving Atlético Madrid. He made his MLS debut in the opening match of the 2023 season against Houston Dynamo, though his initial run was disrupted by injury before he returned to regular first‑team action later in the campaign.

Arias scored his first goal for Cincinnati on 21 June 2023 in a 3–0 home win against Toronto FC, giving Cincinnati the lead in the 35th minute in a match that set a league record for the club's most consecutive home victories in all competitions. Over the 2023 MLS season he made 32 appearances across all competitions, scoring three goals and providing two assists, contributing offensively as well as defensively from right‑back.

During his time with Cincinnati, Arias helped the club win the 2023 Supporters’ Shield, awarded to the team with the best regular‑season record in MLS.

=== Bahia ===
In January 2024, Arias signed with Brazilian Campeonato Brasileiro Série A club Bahia after leaving FC Cincinnati as a free agent following the expiration of his contract with the MLS side.

On 15 February 2024, Arias scored his first goal for Bahia in a 3–0 victory over América‑RN in the Copa do Nordeste. During his time with the club, he made 73 official appearances, scored two goals and provided four assists, helping Bahia win the Campeonato Baiano. He also featured in the Copa Libertadores with Bahia. Arias left Bahia at the end of the 2025 season when his contract expired.

=== Independiente ===
In January 2026, Arias signed with Argentine Argentine Primera División club Independiente as a free agent after his spell at Bahia. He was officially presented by Independiente after completing his medical and signed a contract until December 2027.

== International career ==
=== Youth ===
Arias was part of the Colombia U17 team that finished fourth in the 2009 FIFA U-17 World Cup, playing all matches (except third place match, making a total of 6 appearances) and scoring the first penalty during the quarter-final penalty shoot-out against Turkey.

In 2011, Arias played all 9 matches for the Colombia U-20 team when they finished sixth in the 2011 South American Youth Championship. Eduardo Lara, Colombia's coach, also called him for the 2011 Toulon Tournament where Arias, who started all 5 matches, was part of Colombia's team that won the final.

=== Senior ===
In September 2013, Arias received his first call up for Colombia's senior team to dispute the 2014 World Cup qualifying matches against Chile and Paraguay, following first choice Camilo Zúñiga's injury. He made his debut against Paraguay and played the entire match in a 1–2 away victory at Asunción.

Arias was included in Colombia's 23-man squad for the 2014 FIFA World Cup in Brazil. He made three appearances in the tournament, coming on as a substitute in all of Colombia's group stage matches. The following year, Arias was included in the final squad for the 2015 Copa America. He appeared twice at the tournament, including the quarter-final 0–0 draw against Argentina where Colombia were eliminated 5–4 on penalties.

He was a part of the Colombian squad that finished third place at the Copa América Centenario.

Arias was selected in José Pékerman's 23-man squad for the 2018 FIFA World Cup in Russia. He started in all four of Colombia's matches as his nation was eliminated in the Round of 16 against England.

== Career statistics ==
=== Club ===
As of match played 10 May 2026

Appearances and goals by club, season and competition
Club	Season	League			National cup		State League		League cup		Continental		Other		Total	
Club	Season	Division	Apps	Goals	Apps	Goals	Apps	Goals	Apps	Goals	Apps	Goals	Apps	Goals	Apps	Goals
La Equidad	2009	Primera A	13	0	—		0	0	0	0	0	0	—		13	0
La Equidad	2010	Primera A	7	0	—		0	0	0	0	0	0	—		7	0
La Equidad	2011	Primera A	7	0	—		0	0	0	0	0	0	—		7	0
La Equidad	Total		27	0	—		0	0	0	0	0	0	—		27	0
Sporting CP B	2012–13	Segunda Liga	28	0	—		—		—		—		—		28	0
Sporting CP	2011–12	Primeira Liga	6	0	—		2	0	0	0	0	0	—		9	0
Sporting CP	2012–13	Primeira Liga	1	0	—		0	0	0	0	0	0	—		1	0
Sporting CP	Total		7	0	—		2	0	0	0	0	0	—		8	0
Jong PSV	2013–14	Eerste Divisie	2	0	—		—		—		—		—		2	0
PSV Eindhoven	2013–14	Eredivisie	25	1	—		1	0	0	0	6 (Note: Appearances in UEFA Europa League)	0	—		32	1
PSV Eindhoven	2014–15	Eredivisie	21	1	—		3	0	0	0	5	0	—		29	1
PSV Eindhoven	2015–16	Eredivisie	32	3	—		3	0	0	0	6 (Note: Appearances in UEFA Champions League)	0	1 (Note: Appearance in Johan Cruyff Shield)	0	42	3
PSV Eindhoven	2016–17	Eredivisie	28	1	—		2	0	0	0	4	1	—		34	2
PSV Eindhoven	2017–18	Eredivisie	30	3	—		3	0	0	0	2	0	—		35	3
PSV Eindhoven	Total		136	9	—		12	0	0	0	23	1	1	0	172	10
Atlético Madrid	2018–19	La Liga	25	1	—		4	0	—		4	0	0	0	33	1
Atlético Madrid	2019–20	La Liga	14	0	—		1	0	—		2	0	1 (Note: Appearance in Supercopa de España)	0	18	0
Atlético Madrid	Total		39	1	—		5	0	—		6	0	1	0	51	1
Bayer Leverkusen (loan)	2020–21	Bundesliga	1	0	—		0	0	—		0	0	—		1	0
Granada (loan)	2021–22	La Liga	12	1	—		2	0	—		—		—		14	1
FC Cincinnati	2023	Major League Soccer	27	2	—		3	1	—		—		2 (Note: Appearances in MLS Cup Playoffs)	0	32	3
Bahia	2024	Série A	23	0	3	0	8	0	—		—		4 (Note: Appearances in Copa do Nordeste)	1	38	1
Bahia	2025	Série A	18	0	6	1	2	0	—		4 (Note: Two appearances in Copa Libertadores, two appearances in Copa Sudamericana)	0	2	0	30	1
Bahia	Total		41	0	9	1	10	0	—		4	0	6	1	68	2
Independiente	2026	AFA Liga Profesional de Fútbol	13	0	—		1	0	—		—		—		14	0
Career total			333	13	9	1	35	2	0	0	33	1	10	1	418	18

=== International ===
As of match played 27 June 2026

Appearances and goals by national team and year
National team	Year	Apps	Goals
Colombia	2013	3	0
Colombia	2014	11	0
Colombia	2015	6	0
Colombia	2016	11	0
Colombia	2017	7	0
Colombia	2018	10	0
Colombia	2019	5	0
Colombia	2020	1	0
Colombia	2021	0	0
Colombia	2022	0	0
Colombia	2023	1	0
Colombia	2024	7	0
Colombia	2025	3	0
Colombia	2026	4	0
Total		69	0

== Honours ==
PSV

- Eredivisie: 2014–15, 2015–16, 2017–18
- Johan Cruijff Shield: 2015, 2016

Atlético Madrid

- UEFA Super Cup: 2018

FC Cincinnati

- Supporters' Shield: 2023

Colombia U20

- Toulon Tournament: 2011

Colombia

- Copa América third place: 2016

Individual

- Eredivisie Player of the Year: 2017–18
- Eredivisie Star XI: 2017–18
- Eredivisie Player of the Month: March 2018
