= Stiven Jimenez =

American soccer player (born 2007)

Personal information
- Date of birth: June 24, 2007 (age 19)
- Place of birth: Riverdale Park, Maryland, United States
- Height: 5 ft 8 in (1.73 m)
- Position: Defensive midfielder

Team information
- Current team: Fluminense (on loan from FC Cincinnati)

Youth career
- 2018–2019: Arlington Soccer Academy
- 2018–2019: Pulo do Gato Futsal
- 2019–2023: FC Cincinnati

Senior career*
Years	Team	Apps	(Gls)
2023–	FC Cincinnati 2	46	(1)
2023–	FC Cincinnati	5	(0)
2026–	→ Fluminense (loan)	0	(0)

International career^{‡}
2023–	United States U16	3	(0)
- * Club domestic league appearances and goals as of 17:11, August 2, 2026 (UTC) ‡ National team caps and goals as of January 25, 2023

Stiven Jimenez (born June 24, 2007) is an American professional soccer player who plays as a defensive midfielder for Fluminense on loan from Major League Soccer club FC Cincinnati.

== Club career ==
Jimenez played futsal in Brazil with the club Pulo do Gato Futsal, before joining the youth academy of FC Cincinnati in 2019. On November 7, 2022, he signed a homegrown contract with the club until 2025 with options for 2026 and 2027, and in doing so became their youngest in their history. On June 21, 2023, he made his senior and professional debut with FC Cincinnati as a late substitute in a 3–0 Major League Soccer win over Toronto FC. At 15 years and 362 days old he was the youngest debutant that season, and fifth youngest in the history of the league.

On September 15, 2026, Jimenez moved on a three-month loan to Brazilian side Fluminense.

== International career ==
Jimenez was born in the United States to a Mexican father and Salvadoran mother, and holds all three nationalities. He was called up to the United States U15 training camps in 2022. In May 2022, he was called up to the Mexico U16s for a training camp. In May 2023, he was called up to the United States U16s for the U-16 International Dream Cup.

== Honors ==
FC Cincinnati

- Supporters' Shield: 2023
