= Bret Halsey (soccer) =

American soccer player (born 2000)

Personal information
- Date of birth: June 1, 2000 (age 26)
- Place of birth: Sterling, Virginia, United States
- Height: 5 ft 9 in (1.75 m)
- Positions: Right-back; defensive midfielder

Youth career
- Loudoun Soccer

College career
Years	Team	Apps	(Gls)
2018–2020	Virginia Cavaliers	31	(1)

Senior career*
Years	Team	Apps	(Gls)
2019	Northern Virginia United	3	(0)
2021–2022	Real Salt Lake	0	(0)
2021–2022	Real Monarchs	22	(0)
2022	→ Colorado Springs Switchbacks (loan)	4	(0)
2023–2025	FC Cincinnati 2	22	(1)
2023–2025	FC Cincinnati	32	(0)
- * Club domestic league appearances and goals as of 00:34, 8 March 2025 (UTC)

Bret Halsey (born June 1, 2000) is an American professional soccer player who plays as a defender.

== Career ==
=== Youth ===
Halsey played high school soccer at Potomac Falls High School, where he was a Second Team All-Conference selection, as well as playing club soccer at Loudoun Soccer Club. With Loudoun, Halsey helped the under-16 boys team secure the club's first national title.

=== College and amateur ===
In 2018, Halsey attended the University of Virginia to play college soccer. In three seasons with the Cavaliers, Halsey made 31 appearances, scoring one goal and tallying two assists. In his sophomore and junior seasons, he was named to the ACC All-Tournament team.

In 2019, Halsey also played in the NPSL for Northern Virginia United, where he made three appearances.

On January 19, 2021, it was announced Halsey would leave college early and sign a Generation Adidas contract, allowing him to enter the 2021 MLS SuperDraft.

=== Professional ===
On January 21, 2021, Halsey was selected 7th overall in the 2021 MLS SuperDraft by Real Salt Lake.

Halsey made his professional debut on July 9, 2021, starting for Salt Lake's USL Championship side Real Monarchs in a 3–1 loss to El Paso Locomotive.

On August 9, 2022, Halsey signed on loan with Colorado Springs Switchbacks for the remainder of the USL Championship season.

Following the 2022 season, his contract option was declined by Salt Lake. Following his release from Salt Lake, Halsey signed with MLS Next Pro side FC Cincinnati 2. He signed a short-term deal to join the FC Cincinnati first team roster on March 24, 2023. On July 1, 2023, Halsey made the permanent move to Cincinnati's MLS roster. He was waived on March 7, 2025.

== Honors ==
FC Cincinnati

- Supporters' Shield: 2023
