= Marco Angulo =

Ecuadorian footballer (2002–2024)

Personal information
- Full name: Marco Antonio Angulo Solórzano
- Date of birth: 8 May 2002
- Place of birth: Esmeraldas, Ecuador
- Date of death: 11 November 2024 (aged 22)
- Place of death: Quito, Ecuador
- Height: 1.80 m (5 ft 11 in)
- Position: Defensive midfielder

Youth career
- –2017: Rocafuerte
- 2017–2020: Independiente del Valle

Senior career*
Years	Team	Apps	(Gls)
2020–2021	Independiente Juniors	38	(1)
2021–2023	Independiente del Valle	24	(1)
2023–2024	FC Cincinnati	24	(0)
2024	→ L.D.U. Quito (loan)	11	(0)
Total		97	(2)

International career
2019	Ecuador U17	7	(0)
2020	Ecuador U20	2	(0)
2022–2024	Ecuador	2	(0)
- * Club domestic league appearances and goals

Marco Antonio Angulo Solórzano (8 May 2002 – 11 November 2024) was an Ecuadorian professional footballer who played as a defensive midfielder. He last played at Ecuadorian Serie A club L.D.U. Quito on loan from Major League Soccer club FC Cincinnati and the Ecuador national team.

== Club career ==
Angulo began his career with Rocafuerte, before joining Independiente del Valle in 2017. He made 24 appearances and scored three goals for Independiente Juniors in 2020 and 2021, before joining the club's senior team in October 2021. Across all competitions, Angulo went on to make 45 appearances and score three goals in 2021 and 2022 for Independiente del Valle, winning the U-20 Copa Libertadores in 2020, the Serie A de Ecuador in 2021, and the Copa Ecuador and the Copa Sudamericana in 2022.

On 21 December 2022, it was announced that on 1 January 2023, Angulo would join Major League Soccer side FC Cincinnati until 2025 in a reported $3 million deal. Angulo made his debut as a 92nd-minute substitute for Luciano Acosta against Orlando City on 4 March 2023.

On 21 March 2024, Angulo was loaned by Cincinnati to L.D.U Quito through 31 December with an option to buy.

== International career ==
In November 2022, Angulo was called up to the Ecuador national team. He made his debut on 12 November 2022, appearing as a substitute during a 0–0 draw with Iraq.

== Personal life and death ==
On 28 November 2022, Angulo was involved in a traffic accident in Guayaquil that led to the death of the driver of the vehicle he was a passenger in.

On 7 October 2024, Angulo was involved in a fatal single-car accident southeast of Quito with four others, in which the driver and one of the other occupants, Roberto Cabezas, a player for Independiente Juniors and a close friend of Angulo, were killed. Angulo suffered serious head injuries and a lung contusion. On 11 November, Angulo succumbed to his injuries after being placed into an induced coma and was pronounced dead at the scene.

== Career statistics ==
=== Club ===
Appearances and goals by club, season and competition
Club	Season	League			National cup (Note: Includes Copa Ecuador, U.S. Open Cup.)		Continental		Other		Total	
Club	Season	Division	Apps	Goals	Apps	Goals	Apps	Goals	Apps	Goals	Apps	Goals
Independiente Juniors	2020	Ecuadorian Serie B	11	0	0	0	0	0	0	0	11	0
Independiente Juniors	2021	Ecuadorian Serie B	27	1	0	0	0	0	0	0	27	1
Independiente Juniors	Total		38	1	0	0	0	0	0	0	38	1
Independiente del Valle	2021	Ecuadorian Serie A	1	0	0	0	0	0	0	0	1	0
Independiente del Valle	2022	Ecuadorian Serie A	23	1	8	0	12 (Note: Five appearances in Copa Libertadores; seven appearances, one goal in Copa Sudamericana)	1	0	0	43	1
Independiente del Valle	Total		24	1	8	0	12	1	0	0	44	2
FC Cincinnati	2023	Major League Soccer	24	0	4	0	0	0	5 (Note: Three appearances in Leagues Cup; two appearances in MLS Cup Playoffs)	0	33	0
L.D.U. Quito (loan)	2024	Ecuadorian Serie A	11	0	1	0	7 (Note: Five appearances in Copa Libertadores; two appearances in Copa Sudamericana)	0	0	0	19	0
Career total			97	2	13	0	19	1	5	0	134	3

=== International ===
Appearances and goals by national team and year
National team	Year	Apps	Goals
Ecuador	2022	1	0
Ecuador	2023	1	0
Total		2	0

== Honors ==
Independiente del Valle Youth

- U-20 Copa Libertadores: 2020

Independiente del Valle

- Serie A: 2021
- Copa Sudamericana: 2022
- Copa Ecuador: 2022

FC Cincinnati

- Supporters' Shield: 2023

L.D.U. Quito

- Serie A: 2024 (posthumously)
