= 2025 FC Cincinnati season =

FC Cincinnati
2025 season
- General manager: Chris Albright
- Head coach: Pat Noonan
- Stadium: TQL Stadium
- MLS: Conference: 2nd Overall: 2nd
- MLS Cup playoffs: Conference Semifinals
- CONCACAF Champions Cup: Round of 16
- Leagues Cup: League phase
- Top goalscorer: League: Evander (18); All: Evander (22)
- Average home league attendance: 24,668
Home colors	Away colors

The 2025 season was the 10th season for FC Cincinnati and their 7th in Major League Soccer (MLS), the highest level of men's professional soccer in the United States. Their home stadium was TQL Stadium. It was the fourth season with the club for general manager Chris Albright and head coach Pat Noonan. Cincinnati commemorated their 10th season with a logo, along a series of patches that had represented different seasons in their first 10 years of history.

== Club ==
=== Roster ===
As of September 22, 2025

No.	Name	Nationality	Position	Date of birth (age)	Previous club
1	Alec Kann	United States	GK	August 8, 1990 (age 36)	(United States) Atlanta United FC
13	Evan Louro	United States	GK	January 19, 1996 (age 30)	(United States) Tampa Bay Rowdies
18	Roman Celentano (GA)	United States	GK	September 14, 2000 (age 26)	(United States) Indiana Hoosiers
2	Alvas Powell	Jamaica	DF	July 18, 1994 (age 32)	(United States) Philadelphia Union
3	Gilberto Flores	Paraguay	DF	April 1, 2003 (age 23)	(Paraguay) Sportivo Trinidense
4	Nick Hagglund	United States	DF	September 14, 1992 (age 34)	(Canada) Toronto FC
12	Miles Robinson	United States	DF	March 14, 1997 (age 29)	(United States) Atlanta United
14	Brad Smith	Australia	DF	April 9, 1994 (age 32)	(United States) Houston Dynamo
16	Teenage Hadebe (INTL, DP)	Zimbabwe	DF	September 17, 1995 (age 31)	(Turkey) Konyaspor
21	Matt Miazga	United States	DF	July 19, 1995 (age 31)	(England) Chelsea F.C.
29	Lukas Engel	Denmark	DF	December 14, 1998 (age 27)	(England) Middlesbrough F.C.
32	Noah Adnan	Indonesia	DF	January 21, 2002 (age 24)	(United States) FC Cincinnati 2
42	Amir Daley	United States	DF	February 26, 2002 (age 24)	(United States) FC Cincinnati 2
91	DeAndre Yedlin	United States	DF	July 9, 1993 (age 33)	(United States) Inter Miami CF
5	Obinna Nwobodo (INTL, DP)	Nigeria	MF	November 29, 1996 (age 29)	(Turkey) Göztepe S.K.
11	Samuel Gidi (INTL)	Ghana	MF	April 15, 2004 (age 22)	(Slovakia) MŠK Žilina
15	Dominik Marczuk	Poland	MF	November 1, 2003 (age 22)	(United States) Real Salt Lake
20	Pavel Bucha	Czech Republic	MF	March 11, 1998 (age 28)	(Czech Republic) FC Viktoria Plzeň
22	Gerardo Valenzuela (HG)	United States	MF	September 28, 2004 (age 21)	(United States) FC Cincinnati Academy
23	Luca Orellano	Argentina	MF	March 22, 2000 (age 26)	(Brazil) CR Vasco da Gama
27	Brian Anunga	Cameroon	MF	August 10, 1996 (age 30)	(United States) Nashville SC
37	Stiven Jimenez (HG)	United States	MF	June 24, 2007 (age 19)	(United States) FC Cincinnati Academy
66	Ender Echenique	Venezuela	FW	April 2, 2004 (age 22)	(Venezuela) Caracas F.C.
7	Yuya Kubo (INTL)	Japan	FW	December 23, 1993 (age 32)	(Belgium) K.A.A. Gent
8	Brenner (INTL)	Brazil	FW	January 16, 2000 (age 26)	(Italy) Udinese
9	Kévin Denkey (DP)	Togo	FW	November 30, 2000 (age 25)	(Belgium) Cercle Brugge K.S.V.
10	Evander (INTL, DP)	Brazil	FW	June 9, 1998 (age 28)	(United States) Portland Timbers
17	Sérgio Santos	Brazil	FW	September 4, 1994 (age 32)	(United States) Philadelphia Union
19	Ștefan Chirilă	Romania	FW	January 15, 2007 (age 19)	(United States) FC Cincinnati 2
26	Ayoub Jabbari (INTL)	Morocco	FW	January 30, 2000 (age 26)	(France) Grenoble Foot 38
35	Kenji Mboma Dem	France	FW	January 22, 2002 (age 24)	(United States) FC Cincinnati 2
85	Kei Kamara	Sierra Leone	FW	September 1, 1984 (age 42)	(United States) Los Angeles FC

== Player movement ==
=== In ===
Date	No.	Pos	Player	Transferred from	Fee/notes
January 1, 2025	9	FW	(Togo) Kévin Denkey	(Belgium) Cercle Brugge	Transfer
January 1, 2025	23	MF	(Argentina) Luca Orellano	(Brazil) Vasco da Gama	Transfer
January 13, 2025	27	MF	(Cameroon) Brian Anunga	(United States) Nashville SC	Free agent
February 17, 2025	10	MF	(Brazil) Evander	(United States) Portland Timbers	Cash-for-player trade
March 14, 2025	14	DF	(Australia) Brad Smith	(United States) Houston Dynamo	Free agent
May 12, 2025	85	FW	(Sierra Leone) Kei Kamara	(United States) Los Angeles FC	Free agent
July 8, 2025	66	FW	(Venezuela) Ender Echenique	(Venezuela) Caracas F.C.	Transfer
August 19, 2025	11	MF	(Ghana) Samuel Gidi	(Slovakia) MŠK Žilina	Transfer

=== Out ===
Date	No.	Pos	Player	Transferred to	Fee/notes
December 9, 2024	6	DF	(Nigeria) Chidozie Awaziem	(United States) Colorado Rapids	Trade
December 9, 2024	32	DF	(United States) Ian Murphy	(United States) Colorado Rapids	Trade
December 13, 2024	14	DF	(United States) Kipp Keller	(United States) Minnesota United FC	Re-Entry Draft Stage 1
February 12, 2025	10	MF	(Argentina) Luciano Acosta	(United States) FC Dallas	Cash-for-player trade
August 6, 2025	11	FW	(United States) Corey Baird	(United States) San Diego FC	Cash-for-player trade
August 21, 2025	91	DF	(United States) DeAndre Yedlin	(United States) Real Salt Lake	Cash-for-player trade
August 22, 2025	17	FW	(Brazil) Sérgio Santos	(United States) Houston Dynamo	Waived

=== Loans In ===
No.	Pos	Player	Loaned from	Loan start date	Loan end date	Ref
29	DF	(Denmark) Lukas Engel	(England) Middlesbrough F.C.	February 14, 2025	End of 2025 season	
26	FW	(Morocco) Ayoub Jabbari	(France) Grenoble Foot 38	August 2, 2025	End of 2025 season	
8	FW	(Brazil) Brenner	(Italy) Udinese	August 21, 2025	End of 2025 season	
15	MF	(Poland) Dominik Marczuk	(United States) Real Salt Lake	August 21, 2025	End of 2025 season	

=== Loans Out ===
No.	Pos	Player	Loaned to	Loan start date	Loan end date	Ref
31	MF	(Argentina) Álvaro Barreal	(Brazil) Santos FC	February 6, 2025	Through December 2025	

=== 2025 MLS SuperDraft picks ===
Round	Pick #	Player	Pos	College	Notes
3	80	(United States) Ben Augee	MF	Gonzaga	

== Competitions ==
Win Draw Loss

All matches are in Eastern Time

=== Preseason ===
==== Matches ====
Win Draw Loss

January 24 Preseason	FC Cincinnati	1–0	CF Montréal	Clearwater, FL
12:00 PM	A. Chirila 56'			Stadium: Walter Campbell Sports Park

January 30 Preseason	FC Cincinnati	1–1	Houston Dynamo	Clearwater, FL
12:00 PM	Bucha 40'	Report	Segal 85'	Stadium: Joe DiMaggio Sports Complex

February 7 Preseason	FC Cincinnati	4–1	Philadelphia Union	Clearwater, FL
5:00 pm	Bucha 61'; Nwobodo 64'; Augee 86'; Mboma Dem 115'		Glesnes 8'	Stadium: Joe DiMaggio Sports Complex
Note: Additional 30-minute period played after 90 minutes.

February 12 Preseason	FC Cincinnati	2–2	Atlanta United FC	Bradenton, FL
	Denkey 57'; Mboma Dem 85'	Report	Lobjanidze 76'; Almirón 90+1' (pen.)	Stadium: IMG Academy

=== Major League Soccer ===
==== League tables ====
===== Eastern Conference =====
MLS Eastern Conference table (2025)
Pos	Team	Pld	W	L	T	GF	GA	GD	Pts	Qualification
1	Philadelphia Union	34	20	8	6	57	35	+22	66	Qualification for round one and the CONCACAF Champions Cup round one
2	FC Cincinnati	34	20	9	5	52	40	+12	65	Qualification for round one
3	Inter Miami CF (C)	34	19	7	8	81	55	+26	65	Qualification for round one
4	Charlotte FC	34	19	13	2	55	46	+9	59	Qualification for round one
5	New York City FC	34	17	12	5	50	44	+6	56	Qualification for round one

Source: MLS
Rules for classification: 1) points; 2) total wins; 3) total goal differential; 4) total goals scored; 5) fewer disciplinary points; 6) away goal differential; 7) away goals scored; 8) home goals differential; 9) home goals scored; 10) coin toss (2 clubs tied) or drawing of lots (≥3 clubs tied)
(C) Conference champion

===== Overall =====
Overall MLS standings table (2025)
Pos	Team	Pld	W	L	T	GF	GA	GD	Pts	Qualification
1	Philadelphia Union (S)	34	20	8	6	57	35	+22	66	Qualification for the CONCACAF Champions Cup Round one (Note: As 2025 MLS Supporters' Shield champions)
2	FC Cincinnati	34	20	9	5	52	40	+12	65	Qualification for the CONCACAF Champions Cup Round one (Note: As highest-ranked club in 2025 MLS Supporters' Shield not already qualified)
3	Inter Miami CF (C)	34	19	7	8	81	55	+26	65	Qualification for the CONCACAF Champions Cup Round of 16 (Note: As 2025 MLS Cup champions)
4	San Diego FC	34	19	9	6	64	41	+23	63	Qualification for the CONCACAF Champions Cup Round one (Note: As Western Conference regular season winners)
5	Vancouver Whitecaps FC (V)	34	18	7	9	66	38	+28	63	Qualification for the CONCACAF Champions Cup Round one (Note: As second highest-ranked club in 2025 MLS Supporters' Shield not already qualified)

Source: MLS
Rules for classification: 1) points; 2) total wins; 3) total goal differential; 4) total goals scored; 5) fewer disciplinary points; 6) away goal differential; 7) away goals scored; 8) home goals differential; 9) home goals scored; 10) coin toss (2 clubs tied) or drawing of lots (≥3 clubs tied)
(C) MLS Cup champions; (S) Supporters' Shield winners; (V) Canadian Championship winners

== Overview ==
Competition	First match	Last match	Starting round	Final position	Record							
Competition	First match	Last match	Starting round	Final position	Pld	W	D	L	GF	GA	GD	Win %
Major League Soccer	February 22, 2025	October 18, 2025	Matchday 1	2nd	34	20	5	9	52	40	+12	58.82
MLS Cup Playoffs	October 27, 2025	November 23, 2025	Round one	Conference Semifinals	4	2	0	2	3	9	−6	50.00
Leagues Cup	July 31, 2025	August 7, 2025	League Phase	League Phase	3	1	1	1	6	6	+0	33.33
CONCACAF Champions Cup	February 19, 2025	March 11, 2025	Round One	Round of 16	4	1	2	1	7	6	+1	25.00
Total					45	24	8	13	68	61	+7	53.33

Last updated: October 18th
Source: Competitions

== Results summary ==
Overall								Home						Away					
Pld	Pts	W	L	T	GF	GA	GD	W	L	T	GF	GA	GD	W	L	T	GF	GA	GD
34	65	20	9	5	52	40	+12	9	5	3	27	19	+8	11	4	2	25	21	+4

Last updated: October 18, 2025
Source: MLS Results
Pld = Matches played; Pts = Points; W = Matches won; T = Matches tied; L = Matches lost; GF = Goals for; GA = Goals against; GD = Goal difference

== Results by round ==
Round	1	2	3	4	5	6	7	8	9	10	11	12	13	14	15	16	17	18	19	20	21	22	23	24	25	26	27	28	29	30	31	32	33	34
Stadium	H	A	H	A	H	A	H	A	A	H	A	H	A	A	A	H	H	A	A	A	H	H	H	A	A	H	A	H	H	H	A	H	A	H
Result	W	L	W	L	D	W	W	W	W	W	L	W	W	D	L	D	L	W	W	W	W	L	W	W	D	L	W	L	L	W	W	D	W	W
Points	3	3	6	6	7	10	13	16	19	22	22	25	28	29	29	30	30	33	36	39	42	42	45	48	49	49	52	52	52	55	58	59	62	65
Position (East)	4	8	4	9	10	8	5	3	2	1	3	1	1	2	2	2	2	2	2	2	1	2	2	1	2	2	1	2	2	2	2	2	2	2

Updated to match(es) played on October 4, 2025. Source: Match reports
A = Away; H = Home; N = Neutral; W = Win; D = Draw; L = Loss; = Conference leader; = Playoffs berth; = Wild card berth

=== Match results ===
Win Draw Loss Void Postponed

February 22 1	FC Cincinnati	1–0	New York Red Bulls	Cincinnati, Ohio
7:30 p.m. EST	Nwobodo (yellow card) 64'; Denkey 70'; Baird (yellow card) 88'	Report	Hack (yellow card) 59'	Stadium: TQL Stadium; Attendance: 22,747; Referee: Lukasz Szpala

March 1 2	Philadelphia Union	4–1	FC Cincinnati	Chester, Pennsylvania
7:30 p.m. EST	Baribo 6', 30', 52'; Damiani 90+3'	Report	Evander 58'; Nwobodo (yellow card) 75'	Stadium: Subaru Park; Attendance: 18,737; Referee: Allen Chapman

March 8 3	FC Cincinnati	2–0	Toronto FC	Cincinnati, Ohio
7:30 p.m. EST	Evander (yellow card) 66'; Denkey 73' (pen.); Kubo 88'; Powell (yellow card) 89'	Report	Thompson (yellow card) 50'	Stadium: TQL Stadium; Attendance: 23,088; Referee: Ismir Pekmic

March 15 4	Charlotte FC	2–0	FC Cincinnati	Charlotte, North Carolina
7:30 p.m. EDT	Abada 48'; Agyemang 51'	Report	Flores (yellow card) 45' (yellow-red card) 83'; Nwobodo (yellow card) 76'	Stadium: Bank of America Stadium; Attendance: 27,807; Referee: Sergii Boiko

March 22 5	FC Cincinnati	2–2	Atlanta United FC	Cincinnati, Ohio
2:30 p.m. EDT	Engel (yellow card) 9'; Kubo (yellow card) 28'; Yedlin (yellow card) 59'; Evander 70', 75'	Report	Reilly (yellow card) 28'; Latte Lath 50', (yellow card) 90+1'; Edwards (yellow card) 69'; Powell 88' (o.g.)	Stadium: TQL Stadium; Attendance: 23,120; Referee: Rosendo Mendoza

March 29 6	Nashville SC	1–2	FC Cincinnati	Nashville, Tennessee
8:30 p.m. EDT	Bauer 39'; Tagseth (yellow card) 90+2'	Report	Evander 43'; Denkey 90+1' (pen.)	Stadium: Geodis Park; Attendance: 25,640; Referee: Drew Fischer

April 5 7	FC Cincinnati	1–0	New England Revolution	Cincinnati, Ohio
7:30 p.m. EDT	Denkey (yellow card) 14'; Orellano (yellow card) 39'; Santos 65'	Report	Polster (yellow card) 52'; Miller (yellow card) 83'	Stadium: TQL Stadium; Attendance: 22,912; Referee: Pierre-Luc Lauziere

April 12 8	D.C. United	0–1	FC Cincinnati	Washington, D.C.
7:30 p.m. EDT	MacNaughton (yellow card) 25'; Rowles (yellow card) 41'; Schnegg (yellow card) 69'	Report	Valenzuela 28'; Engel (yellow card) 50'	Stadium: Audi Field; Attendance: 16,152; Referee: Ismir Pekmic

April 19 9	Chicago Fire FC	2–3	FC Cincinnati	Chicago, Illinois
8:30 p.m. EDT	Cuypers 31'; Gutiérrez 85' (pen.); Acosta (yellow card) 88'	Report	Evander 9', 71'; Denkey 42', (yellow card) 43'; Celentano (yellow card) 90+5'; Orellano (yellow card) 90+6'	Stadium: Soldier Field; Attendance: 17,732; Referee: Lorenzo Hernandez

April 26 10	FC Cincinnati	2–1	Sporting Kansas City	Cincinnati, Ohio
2:30 p.m. EDT	Anunga (yellow card) 17'; Denkey 43', 78', (yellow card) 79'	Report	Joveljić (yellow card) 65'; Bassong 89'	Stadium: TQL Stadium; Attendance: 25,513; Referee: Allen Chapman

May 4 11	New York City FC	1–0	FC Cincinnati	New York, New York
5:00 p.m. EDT	Fernández 9'; Freese (yellow card) 39'; Wolf (yellow card) 72'; Haak (yellow card) 75'	Report	Miazga (yellow card) 12'; Evander (yellow card) 90+2'	Stadium: Citi Field; Attendance: 21,611; Referee: Drew Fischer

May 10 12	FC Cincinnati	2–1	Austin FC	Cincinnati, Ohio
7:30 p.m. EDT	Evander 12'; Denkey (yellow card) 35'; Valenzuela 76'	Report	Vázquez 48' (pen.); Šabović (yellow card) 69'	Stadium: TQL Stadium; Attendance: 25,513; Referee: Tori Penso

May 14 13	Toronto FC	0–1	FC Cincinnati	Toronto, Ontario
7:30 p.m. EDT	Bernardeschi (yellow card) 19'	Report	Denkey 18'; Flores (yellow card) 24'; Evander (yellow card) 32'; Engel (yellow card) 90'	Stadium: BMO Field; Attendance: 14,018; Referee: Jair Marrufo

May 17 14	Columbus Crew	1–1	FC Cincinnati	Columbus, Ohio
7:00 p.m. EDT	Rossi 54' (pen.)	Report	Denkey 6'; Bucha (yellow card) 20'	Stadium: Lower.com Field; Attendance: 20,363; Referee: Rubiel Vazquez

May 25 15	Atlanta United FC	4–2	FC Cincinnati	Atlanta, Georgia
7:00 p.m. EDT	Williams 15'; Fortune 20'; Slisz 66'; Thiaré 90+4'	Report	Robinson (yellow card) 15', (goal) 48'; Nwobodo (yellow card) 38'; Valenzuela 70'; Yedlin (yellow card) 90'	Stadium: Mercedes-Benz Stadium; Attendance: 40,919; Referee: Guido Gonzales Jr.

May 28 16	FC Cincinnati	3–3	FC Dallas	Cincinnati, Ohio
7:30 p.m. EDT	Powell (yellow card) 2'; Bucha 30'; Denkey 42' (pen.); Hadebe (yellow card) 78'; Valenzuela 86'; Baird (yellow card) 90+4'	Report	Farfan (yellow card) 8'; Kaick (yellow card) 44'; Musa 50', (yellow card) 62'; Julio 68'; Ibeagha 90+2'	Stadium: TQL Stadium; Attendance: 24,524; Referee: Marcos de Oliveira

May 31 17	FC Cincinnati	1–2	D.C. United	Cincinnati, Ohio
7:30 p.m. EDT	Denkey 15'; Miazga (yellow card) 45+4'	Report	Pirani 2'; Antley 19'; Peltola (yellow card) 44'; Murrell (yellow card) 45+4'; Servania (yellow card) 69'; Badji (yellow card) 90+4'; Zouhir (yellow card) 90+5'	Stadium: TQL Stadium; Attendance: 25,513; Referee: Alexis Da Silva

June 14 18	New England Revolution	0–1	FC Cincinnati	Foxborough, Massachusetts
7:30 p.m. EDT	Ceballos (yellow card) 16'; Fofana (yellow card) 90+3'	Report	Denkey 26'; Kamara (yellow card) 40'; Orellano (yellow card) 52'; Yedlin (yellow card) 59'	Stadium: Gillette Stadium; Attendance: 27,184; Referee: Filip Dujic

June 25 19	CF Montréal	1–3	FC Cincinnati	Montreal, Quebec
7:30 p.m. EDT	Clark (yellow card) 20'; Sealy (yellow card) 58'; Owusu 90'; Bugaj (yellow card) 90+3'	Report	Evander 45', 83'; Orellano 65'	Stadium: Saputo Stadium; Attendance: 15,012; Referee: Ricardo Montero

June 28 20	Orlando City SC	1–2	FC Cincinnati	Orlando, Florida
7:30 p.m. EDT	Pašalić (yellow card) 45', (goal) 87'; Enrique (yellow card) 54'; Brekalo (yellow card) 90+5'	Report	Flores (yellow card) 43'; Yedlin (yellow card) 45'; Evander 45+4', 74'; Baird (yellow card) 90+4'	Stadium: Inter&Co Stadium; Attendance: 20,061; Referee: Marcos de Oliveira

July 5 21	FC Cincinnati	2–1	Chicago Fire FC	Cincinnati, Ohio
7:30 p.m. EDT	Evander 19'; Denkey 50'; Kamara (yellow card) 53'; Miazga (yellow card) 83'	Report	Zinckernagel 55'; Bamba (yellow card) 76'; Elliott (yellow card) 90+7'	Stadium: TQL Stadium; Attendance: 25,513; Referee: Pierre-Luc Lauziere

July 12 22	FC Cincinnati	2–4	Columbus Crew	Cincinnati, Ohio
7:30 p.m. EDT	Bucha 1', (yellow card) 45'; Evander 5', (yellow card) 45+5'; Anunga (yellow card) 18'; Robinson (yellow card) 86'	Report	Rossi 42'; Arfsten 45+3'; Chambost (yellow card) 53'; Robinson 59' (o.g.); Gazdag (yellow card) 68'; Russell-Rowe (yellow card) 78'; Habroune 90+3', (yellow card) 90+5'	Stadium: TQL Stadium; Attendance: 25,513; Referee: Alexis Da Silva

July 16 23	FC Cincinnati	3–0	Inter Miami CF	Cincinnati, Ohio
7:30 p.m. EDT	Valenzuela 16'; Evander 50', 70'; Hadebe (yellow card) 81'	Report		Stadium: TQL Stadium; Attendance: 25,513; Referee: Lukasz Szpala

July 19 24	Real Salt Lake	0−1	FC Cincinnati	Sandy, Utah
8:30 p.m. EDT	Katranis (yellow card) 31'; Vera (yellow card) 39'	Report	Baird (yellow card) 16'; Hadebe (yellow card) 27'; Flores (yellow card) 42'; Yedlin (yellow card) 73'; Orellano 87'	Stadium: America First Field; Attendance: 19,836; Referee: Lorenzo Hernandez

July 26 25	Inter Miami CF	0−0	FC Cincinnati	Fort Lauderdale, Florida
7:00 p.m. EDT	Cremaschi (yellow card) 7'; Avilés (yellow card) 36'; Redondo (yellow card) 60'; Weigandt (yellow card) 90'	Report		Stadium: Chase Stadium; Attendance: 21,044; Referee: Tori Penso

August 10 26	FC Cincinnati	0−1	Charlotte FC	Cincinnati, Ohio
6:00 p.m. EDT	Engel (yellow card) 62'; Valenzuela (yellow card) 64'; Anunga (red card) 70'; Celentano (yellow card) 82'; Evander (yellow card) 90+8'	Report	Zaha 85'; Vargas (yellow card) 90+7'	Stadium: TQL Stadium; Attendance: 25,513; Referee: Filip Dujic

August 16 27	Portland Timbers	2–3	FC Cincinnati	Portland, Oregon
10:30 p.m. EDT	Kelsy (yellow card) 13' (goal) 38', 68' (pen.); Paredes (yellow card) 60'	Report	Denkey 10'; Bucha 25'; Evander 36'; Robinson (yellow card) 45+3'	Stadium: Providence Park; Attendance: 25,218; Referee: Rubiel Vazquez

August 23 28	FC Cincinnati	0–1	New York City FC	Cincinnati, Ohio
7:30 p.m. EDT		Report	Fernández Mercau (yellow card) 29'; Martínez 55'; Ojeda (yellow card) 63'; O'Toole (yellow card) 89'	Stadium: TQL Stadium; Attendance: 25,513; Referee: Victor Rivas

August 30 29	FC Cincinnati	0–1	Philadelphia Union	Cincinnati, Ohio
7:30 p.m. EDT	Marczuk (yellow card) 21'; Denkey (yellow card) 90+1'	Report	Makhanya (yellow card) 21' (yellow-red card) 60'; Glesnes (yellow card) 45+4'; Damiani 49'; Harriel (yellow card) 51'; Westfield (yellow card) 85'	Stadium: TQL Stadium; Attendance: 24,462; Referee: Sergii Boiko

September 13 30	FC Cincinnati	2–1	Nashville SC	Cincinnati, Ohio
7:30 p.m. EDT	Bucha (yellow card) 48'; Brenner 73', (yellow card) 74'; Evander 90+8'	Report	Surridge 84'	Stadium: TQL Stadium; Attendance: 24,749; Referee: Marcos de Oliveira

September 20 31	LA Galaxy	2–3	FC Cincinnati	Carson, California
10:30 p.m. EDT	Paintsil 39'; Fagúndez (yellow card) 43'; Parente (yellow card) 45+4' (yellow-red card) 51'; Cuevas 90+1'	Report	Echenique 10'; Brenner 22', 88'; Hagglund (yellow card) 59'	Stadium: Dignity Health Sports Park; Attendance: 18,518; Referee: Malik Badawi

September 28 32	FC Cincinnati	1–1	Orlando City SC	Cincinnati, Ohio
7:00 p.m. EDT	Gidi (yellow card) 45+2'; Evander (yellow card) 66'; Denkey 73'	Report	Atuesta (yellow card) 32'; Brekalo (yellow card) 37'; Freeman (yellow card) 54', (goal) 90+6'; Smith (yellow card) 67'; Schlegel (yellow card) 86'	Stadium: TQL Stadium; Attendance: 24,135; Referee: Rosendo Mendoza
Note: Match originally scheduled for September 27.

October 4 33	New York Red Bulls	0–1	FC Cincinnati	Harrison, New Jersey
7:30 p.m. EDT	Donkor (yellow card) 58'; Parker (yellow card) 90+2'; Hack (yellow card) 90+4'	Report	Denkey 12', (yellow card) 32'	Stadium: Sports Illustrated Stadium; Attendance: 25,017; Referee: Alexis Da Silva

October 18 34	FC Cincinnati	3–0	CF Montréal	Cincinnati, Ohio
6:00 p.m. EDT	Hagglund 33', (yellow card) 45+4'; Evander 56'; Gidi (yellow card) 61'; Brenner 88'		Loturi (yellow card) 29'; Sealy (yellow card) 42'	Stadium: TQL Stadium; Referee: Timothy Ford

=== MLS Cup Playoffs ===
==== Round One ====
October 27 Round One	FC Cincinnati	1–0	Columbus Crew	Cincinnati, Ohio
6:45 pm EDT	Evander (yellow card) 29'; Kubo (yellow card) 55'; Denkey 78'; Bucha (yellow card) 90+3'	Report	Arfsten (yellow card) 19'	Stadium: TQL Stadium; Attendance: 23,371; Referee: Rubiel Vazquez

November 2 Round One	Columbus Crew	4–0	FC Cincinnati	Columbus, Ohio
6:30 pm EST	Arfsten 33'; Chambost 41'; Herrera 65'; Russell-Rowe 69'	Report	Kubo (yellow card) 7' (red card) 38'; Robinson (yellow card) 30'; Evander (yellow card) 74'	Stadium: Lower.com Field; Attendance: 19,506; Referee: Guido Gonzales Jr.

November 8 Round One	FC Cincinnati	2–1	Columbus Crew	Cincinnati, Ohio
6:00 pm EST	Hagglund (yellow card) 10'; Brenner 67', 86', (yellow card) 87'	Report	Amundsen (yellow card) 4'; Habroune (yellow card) 35'; Russell-Rowe 63'	Stadium: TQL Stadium; Attendance: 25,513; Referee: Chris Penso
Note: FC Cincinnati won the series 2–1.

==== Conference Semifinals ====
November 23 Conference Semifinals	FC Cincinnati	0–4	Inter Miami CF	Cincinnati, Ohio
5:00 pm EST		Report	Messi 19'; Silvetti 57'; Allende 62', 74'	Stadium: TQL Stadium; Attendance: 25,513; Referee: Drew Fischer

=== U.S. Open Cup ===
FC Cincinnati did not send their main squad the 2025 U.S. Open Cup as they were already participating in the 2025 CONCACAF Champions Cup and the 2025 Leagues Cup and sent FC Cincinnati 2 instead.

=== Leagues Cup ===
July 31 Group Stage	Monterrey (Mexico)	2–3	(United States) FC Cincinnati	Cincinnati, Ohio
7:00 p.m. EDT	Arteaga (yellow card) 33'; Canales 45'; Ocampos (yellow card) 87'; Berterame 90+4'	Report	Evander 31'; Orellano 53'; Miazga (yellow card) 79'; Bucha 90'	Stadium: TQL Stadium; Attendance: 24,860; Referee: Katia García

August 3 Group Stage	FC Cincinnati (United States)	2–2 (3–4 p)	(Mexico) Juárez	Cincinnati, Ohio
5:30 p.m. EDT	Miazga (yellow card) 3'; Flores (yellow card) 20'; Evander 72'; Estupiñán 77' (o.g.)	Report	Ricardinho 39'; Castilho 63', (yellow card) 73'; Torres (yellow card) 67'	Stadium: TQL Stadium; Attendance: 17,314; Referee: Alyssa Nichols
	Penalties
	Engel (penalty scored); Orellano (penalty scored); Miazga (penalty missed); Bucha (penalty scored); Evander (penalty missed)		(penalty scored) Estupiñán; (penalty scored) Villalpando; (penalty scored) Pizarro; (penalty scored) D. García; (penalty missed) Torres

August 7 Group Stage	FC Cincinnati (United States)	1–2	(Mexico) Guadalajara	Cincinnati, Ohio
7:00 p.m. EDT	Mosquera 67'; Hadebe (yellow card) 68'	Report	Álvarez 25' (pen.); González 57'; Gómez (yellow card) 78'; Wilke (yellow card) 90+1'	Stadium: TQL Stadium; Attendance: 21,102; Referee: Rubiel Vazquez

=== Round One ===
February 19 1st Leg	Motagua (Honduras)	1–4	(United States) FC Cincinnati	Tegucigalpa, Honduras
10:00 p.m. EST	Mejía (yellow card) 34'; Auzmendi 41'; Martínez (yellow card) 71'	Report	Adnan (yellow card) 22'; Bucha 28', 78'; Nwobodo (yellow card) 45+1'; Denkey 49'; Celentano (yellow card) 70'; Evander 87'	Stadium: Estadio Nacional Chelato Uclés; Attendance: 2,917; Referee: Bryan López

February 26 2nd Leg	FC Cincinnati (United States)	1–1 (5–2 agg.)	(Honduras) Motagua	Cincinnati, Ohio
6:30 p.m. EST	Denkey 19'; Daley (yellow card) 27'	Report	Auzmendi 10'; Meléndez (yellow card) 56'	Stadium: TQL Stadium; Attendance: 21,280; Referee: Víctor Cáceres Hernández
Note: FC Cincinnati won 5-2 on aggregate.

=== Round of 16 ===
March 4 1st Leg	FC Cincinnati (United States)	1–1	(Mexico) Tigres UANL	Cincinnati, Ohio
6:30 p.m. EST	Bucha 3'; Denkey (yellow card) 54'; Hadebe (yellow card) 72'; Nwobodo (yellow card) 88'	Report	Ibáñez 17'; Garza (yellow card) 79'	Stadium: TQL Stadium; Attendance: 14,298; Referee: Bryan Lopez (Guatemala)

March 12 2nd Leg	Tigres UANL (Mexico)	3–1 (4–2 agg.)	(United States) FC Cincinnati	San Nicolás de los Garza, Mexico
10:30 p.m. EDT	Herrera 64'; Brunetta 69'; Ibáñez 73'	Report	Evander 18'; Yedlin (yellow card) 62'; Engel (yellow card) 83'	Stadium: Estadio Universitario; Attendance: 27,992; Referee: Saíd Martínez
Note: UANL won 4–2 on aggregate.

== Statistics ==
=== Appearances and goals ===
Numbers after plus-sign(+) denote appearances as a substitute.

No.	Pos	Nat	Player	Total		MLS		MLS Cup		Leagues Cup		Champions Cup	
No.	Pos	Nat	Player	Apps	Goals	Apps	Goals	Apps	Goals	Apps	Goals	Apps	Goals
Goalkeepers
13	GK	(United States) USA	Evan Louro	7	0	4	0	0	0	2	0	1	0
18	GK	(United States) USA	Roman Celentano	33	0	29	0	0	0	1	0	3	0
Defenders
2	DF	(Jamaica) JAM	Alvas Powell	29	0	7+17	0	0	0	1+1	0	2+1	0
3	DF	(Paraguay) PAR	Gilberto Flores	21	0	12+3	0	0	0	2	0	2+2	0
4	DF	(United States) USA	Nick Hagglund	16	0	15	0	0	0	1	0	0	0
12	DF	(United States) USA	Miles Robinson	31	1	25	1	0	0	1+1	0	4	0
14	DF	(Australia) AUS	Brad Smith	20	0	3+14	0	0	0	1+2	0	0	0
15	DF	(United States) USA	Bret Halsey	2	0	0+1	0	0	0	0	0	1	0
16	DF	(Zimbabwe) ZIM	Teenage Hadebe	26	0	8+11	0	0	0	2+1	0	2+2	0
21	DF	(United States) USA	Matt Miazga	23	0	19+2	0	0	0	2	0	0	0
29	DF	(Denmark) DEN	Lukas Engel	38	0	31+2	0	0	0	2	0	3	0
32	DF	(Indonesia) IDN	Noah Adnan	2	0	0	0	0	0	0	0	2	0
42	DF	(United States) USA	Amir Daley	1	0	0	0	0	0	0	0	1	0
Midfielders
5	MF	(Nigeria) NGR	Obinna Nwobodo	16	0	10+3	0	0	0	0	0	3	0
11	MF	(Ghana) GHA	Samuel Gidi	4	0	3+1	0	0	0	0	0	0	0
15	MF	(Poland) POL	Dominik Marczuk	4	0	2+2	0	0	0	0	0	0	0
20	MF	(Czech Republic) CZE	Pavel Bucha	39	7	31+1	3	0	0	1+2	1	4	3
22	MF	(United States) USA	Gerardo Valenzuela	26	5	10+12	5	0	0	2+1	0	0+1	0
23	MF	(Argentina) ARG	Luca Orellano	32	3	22+5	2	0	0	2+1	1	1+1	0
27	MF	(Cameroon) CMR	Brian Anunga	34	0	19+10	0	0	0	3	0	1+1	0
37	MF	(United States) USA	Stiven Jimenez	4	0	1+1	0	0	0	1+1	0	0	0
Forwards
7	FW	(Japan) JPN	Yuya Kubo	16	1	7+5	1	0	0	0	0	2+2	0
8	FW	(Brazil) BRA	Brenner	5	3	5	3	0	0	0	0	0	0
9	FW	(Togo) TOG	Kévin Denkey	33	17	26+3	15	0	0	0	0	4	2
10	FW	(Brazil) BRA	Evander	36	21	28+1	17	0	0	2+1	2	3+1	2
19	FW	(United States) USA	Ștefan Chirilă	5	0	1+1	0	0	0	1	0	0+2	0
26	FW	(Morocco) MAR	Ayoub Jabbari	5	0	1+4	0	0	0	0	0	0	0
35	FW	(France) FRA	Kenji Mboma Dem	6	0	0+4	0	0	0	1	0	0+1	0
43	FW	(Colombia) COL	Andrés Dávila	1	1	0	0	0	0	0+1	1	0	0
66	FW	(Colombia) COL	Ender Echenique	10	1	6+2	1	0	0	1+1	0	0	0
85	FW	(Sierra Leone) SLE	Kei Kamara	20	0	7+11	0	0	0	1+1	0	0	0
Players who have played for FC Cincinnati this season but have left the club:
11	FW	(United States) USA	Corey Baird	22	0	3+15	0	0	0	0	0	2+2	0
17	FW	(Brazil) BRA	Sérgio Santos	21	1	6+12	1	0	0	1	0	0+2	0
91	DF	(United States) USA	DeAndre Yedlin	32	0	22+5	0	0	0	2	0	3	0

- Last updated: October 8, 2025
- Source: Team Stats

=== Top scorers ===
Rank	Position	No.	Name	MLS	MLS Cup	Leagues Cup	Champions Cup	Total
1	FW	10	(Brazil) Evander	17	0	2	2	21
2	FW	9	(Togo) Kévin Denkey	15	0	0	2	17
3	MF	20	(Czech Republic) Pavel Bucha	3	0	1	3	7
4	MF	22	(United States) Gerardo Valenzuela	5	0	0	0	5
5	FW	8	(Brazil) Brenner	3	0	0	0	3
5	FW	23	(Argentina) Luca Orellano	2	0	1	0	3
7	FW	7	(Japan) Yuya Kubo	1	0	0	0	1
7	DF	12	(United States) Miles Robinson	1	0	0	0	1
7	FW	17	(Brazil) Sérgio Santos	1	0	0	0	1
7	FW	43	(Colombia) Andrés Dávila	0	0	1	0	1
7	FW	66	(Venezuela) Ender Echenique	1	0	0	0	1
Total				49	0	5	7	61

- Last updated: October 8, 2025
- Source: Team Stats

=== Top assists ===
Rank	Position	No.	Name	MLS	MLS Cup	Leagues Cup	Champions Cup	Total
1	FW	10	(Brazil) Evander	12	0	2	1	15
2	MF	20	(Czech Republic) Pavel Bucha	6	0	0	0	6
2	MF	23	(Argentina) Luca Orellano	5	0	0	1	6
2	MF	29	(Denmark) Lukas Engel	4	0	1	1	6
5	MF	91	(United States) DeAndre Yedlin	4	0	0	0	4
6	FW	9	(Togo) Kévin Denkey	2	0	0	1	3
7	MF	2	(Jamaica) Alvas Powell	0	0	1	1	2
8	FW	7	(Japan) Yuya Kubo	0	0	0	1	1
8	FW	8	(Brazil) Brenner	1	0	0	0	1
8	FW	11	(United States) Corey Baird	0	0	0	1	1
8	FW	17	(Brazil) Sérgio Santos	1	0	0	0	1
8	MF	21	(United States) Matt Miazga	1	0	0	0	1
8	MF	22	(United States) Gerardo Valenzuela	0	0	1	0	1
8	MF	27	(Cameroon) Brian Anunga	1	0	0	0	1
8	FW	66	(Venezuela) Ender Echenique	1	0	0	0	1
8	FW	85	(Sierra Leone) Kei Kamara	1	0	0	0	1
Total				39	0	5	7	51

- Last updated: October 8, 2025
- Source: Team Stats

=== Disciplinary record ===
No.	Pos.	Player	MLS			MLS Cup			Leagues Cup			Champions Cup			Total		
No.	Pos.	Player	Booked	(yellow card) (yellow-red card)	Sent off (straight red)	Booked	(yellow card) (yellow-red card)	Sent off (straight red)	Booked	(yellow card) (yellow-red card)	Sent off (straight red)	Booked	(yellow card) (yellow-red card)	Sent off (straight red)	Booked	(yellow card) (yellow-red card)	Sent off (straight red)
9	FW	(Togo) Kévin Denkey	7	0	0	0	0	0	0	0	0	1	0	0	8	0	0
10	FW	(Brazil) Evander	6	0	0	0	0	0	0	0	0	1	0	0	7	0	0
5	MF	(Nigeria) Obinna Nwobodo	4	0	0	0	0	0	0	0	0	2	0	0	6	0	0
91	DF	(United States) DeAndre Yedlin	5	0	0	0	0	0	0	0	0	1	0	0	6	0	0
3	DF	(Paraguay) Gilberto Flores	3	1	0	0	0	0	1	0	0	1	0	0	5	1	0
16	DF	(Zimbabwe) Teenage Hadebe	3	0	0	0	0	0	1	0	0	1	0	0	5	0	0
21	DF	(United States) Matt Miazga	3	0	0	0	0	0	2	0	0	0	0	0	5	0	0
29	DF	(Denmark) Lukas Engel	4	0	0	0	0	0	0	0	0	1	0	0	5	0	0
11	FW	(United States) Corey Baird	4	0	0	0	0	0	0	0	0	0	0	0	4	0	0
12	DF	(United States) Miles Robinson	3	0	0	0	0	0	0	0	0	0	0	0	3	0	0
18	GK	(United States) Roman Celentano	2	0	0	0	0	0	0	0	0	1	0	0	3	0	0
20	MF	(Czech Republic) Pavel Bucha	3	0	0	0	0	0	0	0	0	0	0	0	3	0	0
23	MF	(Argentina) Luca Orellano	3	0	0	0	0	0	0	0	0	0	0	0	3	0	0
2	DF	(Jamaica) Alvas Powell	2	0	0	0	0	0	0	0	0	0	0	0	2	0	0
27	MF	(Cameroon) Brian Anunga	2	0	1	0	0	0	0	0	0	0	0	0	2	0	1
85	FW	(Sierra Leone) Kei Kamara	2	0	0	0	0	0	0	0	0	0	0	0	2	0	0
4	DF	(United States) Nick Hagglund	1	0	0	0	0	0	0	0	0	0	0	0	1	0	0
7	MF	(Japan) Yuya Kubo	1	0	0	0	0	0	0	0	0	0	0	0	1	0	0
8	FW	(Brazil) Brenner	1	0	0	0	0	0	0	0	0	0	0	0	1	0	0
11	MF	(Ghana) Samuel Gidi	1	0	0	0	0	0	0	0	0	0	0	0	1	0	0
15	MF	(Poland) Dominik Marczuk	1	0	0	0	0	0	0	0	0	0	0	0	1	0	0
22	MF	(United States) Gerardo Valenzuela	1	0	0	0	0	0	0	0	0	0	0	0	1	0	0
32	DF	(United States) Noah Adnan	0	0	0	0	0	0	0	0	0	1	0	0	1	0	0
42	DF	(United States) Amir Daley	0	0	0	0	0	0	0	0	0	1	0	0	1	0	0
Total			62	1	1	0	0	0	4	0	0	11	0	0	77	1	1

- Last updated: October 8, 2025
- Source: Team Stats

=== Clean sheets ===
No.	Name	MLS	MLS Cup	Leagues Cup	Champions Cup	Total
18	(United States) Roman Celentano	9	0	0	0	9
13	(United States) Evan Louro	1	0	0	0	1

- Last updated: October 8, 2025
- Source: Team Stats

== Awards ==
=== MLS Team of the Matchday ===
Matchday	Player	Opponent	Position	Ref
1	(United States) Miles Robinson	New York Red Bulls	DF	
1	(Togo) Kévin Denkey	New York Red Bulls	Bench	
3	(Japan) Yuya Kubo	Toronto FC	FW	
5	(Brazil) Evander	Atlanta United FC	MF	
6	(United States) Roman Celentano	Nashville SC	GK	
6	(Brazil) Evander	Nashville SC	MF	
7	(Denmark) Lukas Engel	New England Revolution	DF	
8	(United States) Gerardo Valenzuela	D.C. United	MF	
8	(United States) Miles Robinson	D.C. United	Bench	
9	(Brazil) Evander	Chicago Fire	MF	
10	(Togo) Kévin Denkey	Sporting Kansas City	FW	
12	(Brazil) Evander	Austin FC	MF	
13	(Togo) Kévin Denkey	Toronto FC	Bench	
14	(United States) Roman Celentano	Columbus Crew	Bench	
19	(United States) Roman Celentano	New England Revolution	Bench	
19	(Togo) Kévin Denkey	New England Revolution	Bench	
20	(Brazil) Evander	CF Montréal	MF	
20	(Denmark) Lukas Engel	CF Montréal	DF	
21	(Brazil) Evander	Orlando City SC	MF	
21	(United States) Matt Miazga	Orlando City SC	Bench	
21	(United States) Pat Noonan	Orlando City SC	Coach	
22	(Brazil) Evander	Chicago Fire	MF	
25	(Brazil) Evander	Inter Miami	MF	
25	(United States) Pat Noonan	Inter Miami	Coach	
26	(United States) Roman Celentano	Real Salt Lake	GK	
26	(Argentina) Luca Orellano	Real Salt Lake	Bench	
29	(Brazil) Evander	Portland Timbers	MF	
29	(Czech Republic) Pavel Bucha	Portland Timbers	MF	
33	(Brazil) Evander	Nashville SC	MF	
35	(Brazil) Evander	LA Galaxy	MF	
35	(Brazil) Brenner	LA Galaxy	Bench	

=== Goal of the Matchday ===
Matchday	Player	Opponent	Position	Ref
10	(Togo) Kévin Denkey	Sporting Kansas City	FW	

=== MLS All-Star ===
Player	Position	Ref
(Brazil) Evander	MF	
(United States) Miles Robinson	DF	
