= 2026 FC Cincinnati season =

Season of an American soccer team

FC Cincinnati
2026 season
- General manager: Chris Albright
- Head coach: Pat Noonan
- Stadium: TQL Stadium
- MLS: Conference: TBD; Overall: TBD
- CONCACAF Champions Cup: Round of 16
- Leagues Cup: League phase
Home colors	Away colors

The 2026 FC Cincinnati season is the 11th season for FC Cincinnati and their 8th in Major League Soccer (MLS), the highest level of men's professional soccer in the United States. Their home stadium is TQL Stadium. It is the fourth season with the club for general manager Chris Albright and head coach Pat Noonan.

== Club ==
=== Roster ===
As of February 8, 2026

No.	Name	Nationality	Position	Date of birth (age)	Previous club
13	Evan Louro	United States	GK	January 19, 1996 (age 30)	(United States) Tampa Bay Rowdies
18	Roman Celentano (GA)	United States	GK	September 14, 2000 (age 26)	(United States) Indiana Hoosiers
2	Alvas Powell	Jamaica	DF	July 18, 1994 (age 32)	(United States) Philadelphia Union
3	Gilberto Flores	Paraguay	DF	April 1, 2003 (age 23)	(Paraguay) Sportivo Trinidense
4	Nick Hagglund	United States	DF	September 14, 1992 (age 34)	(Canada) Toronto FC
12	Miles Robinson	United States	DF	March 14, 1997 (age 29)	(United States) Atlanta United
15	Teenage Hadebe (INTL)	Zimbabwe	DF	September 17, 1995 (age 31)	(Turkey) Konyaspor
21	Matt Miazga	United States	DF	July 19, 1995 (age 31)	(England) Chelsea
24	Kyle Smith	United States	DF	January 9, 1992 (age 34)	(United States) Orlando City
–	Félix Samson (HG, loan)	Canada	DF	October 26, 2007 (age 19)	(Canada) CF Montréal
5	Obinna Nwobodo (INTL)	Nigeria	MF	November 29, 1996 (age 29)	(Turkey) Göztepe
11	Samuel Gidi (INTL)	Ghana	MF	April 15, 2004 (age 22)	(Slovakia) Žilina
20	Pavel Bucha	Czech Republic	MF	March 11, 1998 (age 28)	(Czech Republic) Viktoria Plzeň
22	Gerardo Valenzuela (HG)	United States	MF	September 28, 2004 (age 22)	(United States) FC Cincinnati Academy
27	Brian Anunga	Cameroon	MF	August 10, 1996 (age 30)	(United States) Nashville SC
30	Ademar Chávez (HG)	Mexico	MF	January 12, 2009 (age 17)	(United States) FC Cincinnati 2
37	Stiven Jimenez (HG)	United States	MF	June 24, 2007 (age 19)	(United States) FC Cincinnati Academy
66	Ender Echenique	Venezuela	FW	April 2, 2004 (age 22)	(Venezuela) Caracas F.C.
9	Kévin Denkey (DP)	Togo	FW	November 30, 2000 (age 25)	(Belgium) Cercle Brugge
10	Evander (INTL, DP)	Brazil	FW	June 9, 1998 (age 28)	(United States) Portland Timbers
14	Kristian Fletcher	United States	FW	August 6, 2005 (age 21)	(United States) D.C. United
16	Tom Barlow	United States	FW	July 8, 1995 (age 31)	(United States) Chicago Fire
17	Kenji Mboma Dem	France	FW	January 22, 2002 (age 24)	(United States) FC Cincinnati 2
19	Ștefan Chirilă	Romania	FW	January 15, 2007 (age 19)	(United States) FC Cincinnati 2
29	Bryan Ramírez	Ecuador	FW	August 6, 2000 (age 26)	(Ecuador) Liga de Quito
99	Ayoub Jabbari	Morocco	FW	January 30, 2000 (age 26)	(France) Grenoble

== Player movement ==
=== In ===
Date	No.	Pos	Player	Transferred/loaned from	Fee/notes
January 1, 2026	99	FW	(Morocco) Ayoub Jabbari	(France) Grenoble	Transfer
January 5, 2026	30	MF	(Mexico) Ademar Chávez	(United States) FC Cincinnati 2	Homegrown player
January 6, 2026	–	DF	(Canada) Félix Samson	(Canada) CF Montréal	Loan
January 7, 2026	24	DF	(United States) Kyle Smith	(United States) Orlando City	Free agent
January 12, 2026	16	FW	(United States) Tom Barlow	(United States) Chicago Fire	Free agent
January 13, 2026	14	FW	(United States) Kristian Fletcher	(United States) D.C. United	Trade
January 15, 2026	29	FW	(Ecuador) Bryan Ramírez	(Ecuador) Liga de Quito	Transfer
January 22, 2026	–	DF	(United States) Brian Schaefer	(United States) FC Cincinnati 2	Homegrown player

=== Out ===
Date	No.	Pos	Player	Transferred to	Fee/notes
December 17, 2025	31	FW	(Argentina) Álvaro Barreal	(Brazil) Santos	Transfer
January 11, 2026	23	MF	(Argentina) Luca Orellano	(Mexico) Monterrey	Transfer

=== Loans Out ===
No.	Pos	Player	Loaned to	Loan start date	Loan end date	Ref
25	GK	(Republic of Ireland) Paul Walters	(Republic of Ireland) Bohemians	January 15, 2026	Through December 2026	
–	DF	(United States) Brian Schaefer	(United States) Tampa Bay Rowdies	January 22, 2026	Through December 2026	

=== 2026 MLS SuperDraft picks ===
Round	Pick #	Player	Pos	College	Notes
2	55	(Libya) Ayoub Lajhar	DF	UConn Huskies	

== Competitions ==
Win Draw Loss

All matches are in Eastern Time

=== Preseason and Friendlies ===
==== Matches ====
Win Draw Loss

January 23 Preseason	FC Cincinnati	1–1	New England Revolution	Bradenton, Florida
	Denkey 51'	Report	Campana 82'

January 28 Preseason	Houston Dynamo FC	1–1	FC Cincinnati	Tampa, Florida
	Samassékou 89'	Report	Denkey 36'	Stadium: Al Lang Stadium

February 7 Preseason	FC Cincinnati	1–0	Detroit City FC	Clearwater, Florida
	Denkey 38' (pen.)	Report		Stadium: Walter Campbell Sports Park

February 12 Preseason	Orlando City SC	2–3	FC Cincinnati	Clearwater, Florida
	49', 50', 53'	Report	Evander 24'; Barlow 77'	Stadium: Walter Campbell Sports Park

July 10 Friendly	Cincinnati (United States)	3–1	(England) Burnley	Cincinnati, United States
19:30 EDT	Denkey 15'; Jabbari 74'; Fletcher 90+4'	Report	Laurent 30'	Stadium: TQL Stadium; Referee: Chris Penson

=== Major League Soccer ===
==== League tables ====
===== Eastern Conference =====
MLS Eastern Conference table (2026)
Pos	Team	Pld	W	L	T	GF	GA	GD	Pts	Qualification
7	Columbus Crew	34	14	15	5	59	52	+7	47	Qualification for round one
8	Orlando City SC	34	13	14	7	63	78	−15	46	Qualification for the wild card round
9	FC Cincinnati	34	12	12	10	67	75	−8	46	Qualification for the wild card round
10	New York Red Bulls	34	12	16	6	48	62	−14	42	
11	New York City FC	34	10	12	12	49	45	+4	42	

Source: MLS
Rules for classification: 1) points; 2) total wins; 3) total goal differential; 4) total goals scored; 5) fewer disciplinary points; 6) away goal differential; 7) away goals scored; 8) home goals differential; 9) home goals scored; 10) coin toss (2 clubs tied) or drawing of lots (≥3 clubs tied)

===== Overall =====
Overall MLS standings table
Pos	Team	Pld	W	L	T	GF	GA	GD	Pts
15	Orlando City SC	34	13	14	7	63	78	−15	46
16	Seattle Sounders FC	34	12	12	10	44	46	−2	46
17	FC Cincinnati	34	12	12	10	67	75	−8	46
18	Real Salt Lake	34	13	15	6	53	52	+1	45
19	Minnesota United FC	34	11	12	11	56	58	−2	44

Source: MLS
Rules for classification: 1) points; 2) total wins; 3) total goal differential; 4) total goals scored; 5) fewer disciplinary points; 6) away goal differential; 7) away goals scored; 8) home goals differential; 9) home goals scored; 10) coin toss (2 clubs tied) or drawing of lots (≥3 clubs tied)

==== Overview ====
Competition	First match	Last match	Starting round	Final position	Record							
Competition	First match	Last match	Starting round	Final position	Pld	W	D	L	GF	GA	GD	Win %
Major League Soccer	February 21, 2026	November 7, 2026	Matchday 1	9th	34	12	12	10	67	75	−8	35.29
MLS Cup playoffs	November 22, 2026	TBD	Round One	TBD	1	1	0	0	1	0	+1	100.00
CONCACAF Champions Cup	February 18, 2026	March 19, 2026	Round one	Round of 16	4	3	0	1	17	5	+12	75.00
Leagues Cup	August 4, 2026	August 11, 2026	League phase	League phase	3	2	0	1	6	3	+3	66.67
Total					42	18	12	12	91	83	+8	42.86

Last updated: November 22, 2026
Source: Competitions

==== Results summary ====
Overall								Home						Away					
Pld	Pts	W	L	T	GF	GA	GD	W	L	T	GF	GA	GD	W	L	T	GF	GA	GD
34	46	12	12	10	67	75	−8	9	5	3	39	32	+7	3	7	7	28	43	−15

Last updated: Complete
Source: MLS Results
Pld = Matches played; Pts = Points; W = Matches won; T = Matches tied; L = Matches lost; GF = Goals for; GA = Goals against; GD = Goal difference

==== Results by round ====
Round	1	2	3	4	5	6	7	8	9	10	11	12	13	14	15	16	17	18	19	20	21	22	23	24	25	26	27	28	29	30	31	32	33	34
Stadium	H	A	H	A	H	A	A	H	A	H	A	A	H	A	H	H	A	H	A	H	H	A	H	A	H	A	A	A	H	H	A	A	H	H
Result	W	L	L	L	W	L	D	D	D	W	W	D	L	D	W	W	L	W	D	W	D	L	L	D	D	L	W	L	L	W	W	D	W	L
Points	3	3	3	3	6	6	7	8	9	12	15	16	16	17	20	23	23	26	27	30	31	31	31	32	33	33	36	36	36	39	42	43	46	46
Position (East)	2	5	7	11	9	10	10	10	11	9	6	6	8	9	7	5	7	6	6	5	6	6	7	9	9	10	9	9	9	8	8	8	7	9

Source: Match reports
A = Away; H = Home; N = Neutral; W = Win; D = Draw; L = Loss; = Conference leader; = Playoffs berth; = Wild card berth

==== Regular season ====
Win Draw Loss Void Postponed

February 21 1	FC Cincinnati	2–0	Atlanta United FC	Cincinnati, Ohio
4:45 p.m. EST	Ramírez (yellow card) 26'; Denkey 80'; Hagglund 90'	Report	Jacob (yellow card) 51'; Alzate (yellow card) 61'	Stadium: TQL Stadium; Attendance: 25,513; Referee: Rosendo Mendoza

February 28 2	Minnesota United FC	1–0	FC Cincinnati	Saint Paul, Minnesota
4:30 p.m. EST	Duggan (yellow card) 59'; Yeboah 66'; Díaz (yellow card) 90+6'	Report		Stadium: Allianz Field; Attendance: 19,609; Referee: Marcos de Oliveira

March 8 3	FC Cincinnati	0–1	Toronto FC	Cincinnati, Ohio
7:00 p.m. EDT	Echenique (yellow card) 15'; Hagglund (yellow card) 81'	Report	Kuscevic (yellow card) 25'; Cifuentes (yellow card) 73'; Sallói 86'	Stadium: TQL Stadium; Attendance: 25,513; Referee: Alexis Da Silva

March 15 4	New England Revolution	6–1	FC Cincinnati	Foxborough, Massachusetts
2:30 p.m. EDT	Langoni (yellow card) 16'; Ceballos 25', 45+3', (yellow card) 28'; Turgeman 31'; Yusuf 53'; Polster (yellow card) 60'; Yow 87'; Miller 89'	Report	Valenzuela 19', (red card) 69'; Ramírez (yellow card) 24'; Jabbari (yellow card) 38'	Stadium: Gillette Stadium; Attendance: 15,627; Referee: Lorenzo Hernandez

March 22 5	FC Cincinnati	4–3	CF Montréal	Cincinnati, Ohio
1:00 p.m. EDT	Echenique 40'; Jabbari 52'; Robinson (red card) 60'; Miazga (yellow card) 62'; Nwobodo (yellow card) 67'; Barlow 80'; Hadebe (yellow card) 83'; Denkey 90+4', (yellow card) 90+5'	Report	Carmona 6'; Owusu 45', 64' (pen.); Synchuk (yellow card) 47'	Stadium: TQL Stadium; Attendance: 25,513; Referee: Filip Dujic

April 4 6	New York Red Bulls	4–2	FC Cincinnati	Harrison, New Jersey
7:30 p.m. EDT	Hall 12'; Forsberg 48'; Donkor (yellow card) 57'; Smith 66' (o.g.); Valencia (yellow card) 83'; Sofo 90+3'	Report	Bucha 17'; Ramírez (yellow card) 37'; Smith 72'; Miazga (yellow card) 80'; Powell (red card) 90+5'	Stadium: Sports Illustrated Stadium; Attendance: 16,712; Referee: Victor Rivas

April 11 7	Toronto FC	1–1	FC Cincinnati	Toronto, Ontario
1:00 p.m. EDT	Kuscevic (yellow card) 38'; Osorio (yellow card) 45+4'; Flores 83' (o.g.)	Report	Ramírez (yellow card) 58'; Denkey (yellow card) 70' (yellow-red card) 71'; Mboma Dem 90+2'	Stadium: BMO Field; Attendance: 15,770; Referee: Ricardo Fierro

April 18 8	FC Cincinnati	3–3	Chicago Fire FC	Cincinnati, Ohio
7:30 p.m. EDT	Gidi (yellow card) 7'; Barlow (yellow card) 11', (goal) 42'; Evander 79' (pen.); D'Avilla 86' (o.g.); Ramírez (yellow card) 90'; Bucha (yellow card) 90'	Report	Cuypers 26', 48'; Zinckernagel 45+5' (pen.); Borso (yellow card) 90'; Elliott (yellow card) 90+9'; Mbokazi (yellow card) 90+9'	Stadium: TQL Stadium; Attendance: 25,513; Referee: Malik Badawi

April 22 9	New York City FC	4–4	FC Cincinnati	New York, New York
7:30 p.m. EDT	Fernández 20', 35'; Ojeda 53'; Magno 79'	Report	Denkey 32', 65'; Flores (yellow card) 50'; Smith (yellow card) 71'; Chirila 90+2'; Anunga (yellow card) 90+6'; Evander 90+5' (pen.)	Stadium: Yankee Stadium; Attendance: 17,847; Referee: Sergii Boiko

April 25 10	FC Cincinnati	2–0	New York Red Bulls	Cincinnati, Ohio
7:30 p.m. EDT	Ramírez (yellow card) 31'; Denkey 40', 45+5' (pen.)	Report	Bungi (yellow card) 19'; Mehmeti (yellow card) 78'	Stadium: TQL Stadium; Attendance: 25,513; Referee: Fotis Bazakos

May 2 11	Chicago Fire FC	2–3	FC Cincinnati	Chicago, Illinois
8:30 p.m. EDT	Cuypers 16', 28'; D'Avilla (yellow card) 90+3'	Report	Evander 24', 31', 90+7' (pen.); Smith (red card) 56'; Denkey (yellow card) 68'; Lajhar (yellow card) 90'; Chirila (yellow card) 90+12'	Stadium: Soldier Field; Attendance: 18,639; Referee: Joe Dickerson

May 9 12	Charlotte FC	2–2	FC Cincinnati	Charlotte, North Carolina
7:30 p.m. EDT	Toklomati 51'; Biel 52'; Westwood (yellow card) 54'	Report	Valenzuela (yellow card) 26'; Denkey 36'; Evander 43', (yellow card) 77'; Gidi (yellow card) 62'; Nwobodo (yellow card) 90'	Stadium: Bank of America Stadium; Attendance: 26,252; Referee: Ismail Elfath

May 13 13	FC Cincinnati	3–5	Inter Miami CF	Cincinnati, Ohio
7:30 p.m. EDT	Denkey 41' (pen.); Bucha 49'; Evander 64', (yellow card) 90+4'; Nwobodo (yellow card) 76'	Report	Messi 24', 55'; Fray (yellow card) 38'; Luján (yellow card) 40'; Bright (yellow card) 77'; Silvetti 79'; Berterame 84'; Celentano 89' (o.g.)	Stadium: TQL Stadium; Attendance: 25,513; Referee: Alexis Da Silva

May 16 14	San Diego FC	3–3	FC Cincinnati	San Diego, California
9:30 p.m. EDT	Ingvartsen 32', 90+6'; Vazquez (yellow card) 54'; Pellegrino 66'	Report	Mboma Dem 11'; Robinson (yellow card) 24'; Barlow 50', 90+8', (yellow card) 90'; Nwobodo (yellow card) 87'	Stadium: Snapdragon Stadium; Attendance: 24,984; Referee: Timothy Ford

May 23 15	FC Cincinnati	6–2	Orlando City SC	Cincinnati, Ohio
7:30 p.m. EDT	Valenzuela (yellow card) 32'; Mboma Dem 42', 52'; Evander 45+3', 58'; Miazga (yellow card) 47'; Denkey 77'; Barlow 90+1'	Report	Marín (yellow card) 10'; M. Ojeda 16' (pen.), 48'; Tiago (yellow card) 41'; Brekalo (yellow card) 70'	Stadium: TQL Stadium; Attendance: 25,513; Referee: Rubiel Vazquez

July 22 16	FC Cincinnati	4–3	Vancouver Whitecaps FC	Cincinnati, Ohio
7:30 p.m. EDT	Bucha 9', 56', (yellow card) 41'; Denkey 28'; Evander 36'	Report	Blackmon (yellow card) 2'; Badwal 12'; Laborda (yellow card) 18'; Gauld 25', 58'; Ocampo (yellow card) 48'; Cubas (yellow card) 60'; White (yellow card) 78'	Stadium: TQL Stadium; Attendance: 25,513; Referee: Jon Freemon

July 25 17	Columbus Crew	2–1	FC Cincinnati	Columbus, Ohio
7:00 p.m. EDT	Thiaré 41'; Gazdag 45+6' (pen.)	Report	Denkey 9'; Miazga (yellow card) 66'; Valenzuela (red card) 90+4'	Stadium: ScottsMiracle-Gro Field; Attendance: 20,307; Referee: Allen Chapman

August 1 18	FC Cincinnati	4–2	San Jose Earthquakes	Cincinnati, Ohio
7:30 p.m. EDT	Smith (yellow card) 20'; Ramírez 33'; Barlow 79'; Evander 82'; Bucha (yellow card) 87'; Robinson (yellow card) 89'; Jabbari 90+5'	Report	Munie 26'; Werner 56'	Stadium: TQL Stadium; Attendance: 25,513; Referee: Victor Rivas

August 15 19	Orlando City SC	1–1	FC Cincinnati	Orlando, Florida
7:30 p.m. EDT	Jansson (yellow card) 29'; Spicer 48'	Report	Bucha 23'; Evander (yellow card) 55'; Miazga (yellow card) 85'	Stadium: Inter.co Stadium; Attendance: 19,015; Referee: Tori Penso

August 19 20	FC Cincinnati	2–1	New York City FC	Cincinnati, Ohio
7:30 p.m. EDT	Mboma Dem 11'; Miazga (yellow card) 33'; Nwobodo (yellow card) 50'; Gidi (yellow card) 82'; Evander 90+1'	Report	Luighi 21', (yellow card) 55'; Parks (yellow card) 36'; Fernández (yellow card) 74'	Stadium: TQL Stadium; Attendance: 23,317; Referee: Fotis Bazakos

August 22 21	FC Cincinnati	1–1	Seattle Sounders FC	Cincinnati, Ohio
7:30 p.m. EDT	Evander 24'; Ramírez (yellow card) 64'	Report	Sailor (yellow card) 38'; Kingston (yellow card) 75'; Kossa-Rienzi 83'	Stadium: TQL Stadium; Attendance: 25,513; Referee: Drew Fischer

August 29 22	Nashville SC	4–0	FC Cincinnati	Nashville, Tennessee
8:30 p.m. EDT	Surridge 43'; Najar (yellow card) 49'; Mukhtar 53'; Palacios (yellow card) 70'; Tagseth (yellow card) 79'; Acosta 89'; Qasem 90+6'	Report	Nwobodo (yellow card) 44'; Ramírez (yellow card) 89'	Stadium: Geodis Park; Attendance: 26,730; Referee: Armando Villarreal

September 9 23	Philadelphia Union	5–0	FC Cincinnati	Chester, Pennsylvania
7:30 p.m. EDT	Q. Sullivan 43' (pen.); Damiani 45+1', 49', 61'; Iloski 89' (pen.)	Report	Nwobodo (red card) 16'; Evander (yellow card) 40'; Anunga (yellow card) 87'	Stadium: Subaru Park; Attendance: 17,784; Referee: Joe Dickerson

September 12 24	FC Cincinnati	3–3	Charlotte FC	Cincinnati, Ohio
7:30 p.m. EDT	Bucha 2'; Denkey 51', 90+1'; Gidi (yellow card) 76'; Dem (yellow card) 81'	Report	Abada 7'; Biel 17' (pen.); Toklomati 55'; Aloko (yellow card) 83'	Stadium: TQL Stadium; Attendance: 25,513; Referee: Pierre-Luc Lauziere

September 19 25	Houston Dynamo FC	2–2	FC Cincinnati	Houston, Texas
8:30 p.m. EDT	Guilherme 38'; Bogusz 51' (pen.)	Report	Ramírez 73'; Denkey 90+7' (pen.)	Stadium: Shell Energy Stadium; Attendance: 17,941; Referee: Jair Marrufo

September 26 26	CF Montréal	3–1	FC Cincinnati	Montreal, Quebec
7:30 p.m. EDT	Ríos 25'; Longstaff (yellow card) 33'; Herbers (yellow card) 47'; Owusu 72' (pen.), 75'	Report	Barlow 64'; Celentano (yellow card) 71'; Hadebe (yellow card) 85'	Stadium: Saputo Stadium; Attendance: 13,723; Referee: Ismail Elfath

October 10 27	Atlanta United FC	1–3	FC Cincinnati	Atlanta, Georgia
7:30 p.m. EDT	Jacob (yellow card) 43'; Almirón 69'; Amaro (yellow card) 90+4'	Report	Hadebe (yellow card) 2'; Denkey 52', 90+7'; Barlow 84', (yellow card) 90+4'; Malatini (yellow card) 88'	Stadium: Mercedes-Benz Stadium; Attendance: 36,286; Referee: Fotis Bazakos

October 14 28	FC Cincinnati	2–3	New England Revolution	Cincinnati, Ohio
7:30 p.m. EDT	Barlow 13', (yellow card) 44'; Malacia (yellow card) 31'; Denkey 67'; Evander (yellow card) 84'	Report	Feingold (yellow card) 4'; Turgeman 21', 51'; Wynder 43'	Stadium: TQL Stadium; Attendance: 24,060; Referee: Rubiel Vazquez

October 18 29	FC Cincinnati	0–2	Columbus Crew	Cincinnati, Ohio
7:00 p.m. EDT	Gidi (yellow card) 28'; Hadebe (yellow card) 31'	Report	Tapia 22'; Gomes (yellow card) 45+7'; Habroune 54'; Chambost (yellow card) 90+3'	Stadium: TQL Stadium; Attendance: 25,513; Referee: Drew Fischer

October 21 30	FC Cincinnati	2–1	D.C. United	Cincinnati, Ohio
7:00 p.m. EDT	Douděra 14'; Hadebe 55'; Hagglund (yellow card) 87'; Jabbari (yellow card) 90+5'	Report	Nono 38', (yellow card) 54'; Baribo (yellow card) 88'	Stadium: TQL Stadium; Attendance: 25,513; Referee: Timothy Ford
Note: Match originally scheduled for September 5 but was postponed due to inclement weather.

October 24 31	D.C. United	0–2	FC Cincinnati	Washington, D.C.
7:30 p.m. EDT	Baribo (yellow card) 34'	Report	Nwobodo (yellow card) 24'; Evander 35'; Barlow (yellow card) 38', (goal) 58'	Stadium: Audi Field; Attendance: 10,046; Referee: Jon Freemon

October 28 32	Inter Miami CF	2–2	FC Cincinnati	Miami, Florida
7:30 p.m. EDT	Messi (yellow card) 44'; Suárez 61', (yellow card) 90+4'; Riquelme 90'; Segovia (yellow card) 90+2'	Report	Dem 80'; Gidi 86'	Stadium: Nu Stadium; Attendance: 26,752; Referee: Armando Villarreal

October 31 33	FC Cincinnati	1–0	Philadelphia Union	Cincinnati, Ohio
2:00 p.m. EDT	Jabbari 70'	Report		Stadium: TQL Stadium; Attendance: 24,013; Referee: Allen Chapman

November 7 34	FC Cincinnati	0–2	Nashville SC	Cincinnati, Ohio
4:00 p.m. EST	Nwobodo (yellow card) 31'; Evander (yellow card) 41'; Gidi (yellow card) 45+3'; Smith (yellow card) 65'; Bucha (yellow card) 88'	Report	Surridge 61', 86'; Muyl (yellow card) 90'; Woledzi (yellow card) 90+6'	Stadium: TQL Stadium; Referee: Tori Penso

=== MLS Cup playoffs ===
==== Wild Card ====
November 19 Wild card	Orlando City SC	1–3	FC Cincinnati	Orlando, Florida
7:30 p.m. EST	M. Ojeda 26'; Dike (yellow card) 78'; Marín (yellow card) 90+2'	Report	Evander 43' (pen.), 50'; Barlow (yellow card) 51'; Bucha (yellow card) 60'; Nwobodo (yellow card) 63'; Martínez (yellow card) 76'; Gidi 85'	Stadium: Inter.co Stadium; Attendance: 17,147; Referee: Rubiel Vazquez

==== Round One ====
November 22 Round 1 Match 1	Nashville SC	0–1	FC Cincinnati	Nashville, Tennessee
4:00 p.m. EST	Yazbek (yellow card) 45+2'	Report	Yazbek 7' (o.g.); Robinson (yellow card) 39'; Martínez (yellow card) 45'; Malacia (yellow card) 78'; Douděra (yellow card) 85'; Jabbari (yellow card) 90'	Stadium: Geodis Park; Referee: Fotis Bazakos

November 28 Round 1 Match 2	FC Cincinnati	–	Nashville SC	Cincinnati, Ohio
6:30 p.m. EST				Stadium: TQL Stadium

December 2 Round 1 Match 3 (if necessary)	Nashville SC	–	FC Cincinnati	Nashville, Tennessee
TBA				Stadium: Geodis Park

=== CONCACAF Champions Cup ===
==== Round one ====
February 18 First leg	O&M (Dominican Republic)	0–4	(United States) FC Cincinnati	Santiago de los Caballeros, Dominican Republic
8:00 p.m. EST	Trincado (yellow card) 59'; Bello (yellow card) 80'	Report	Barlow 12'; Denkey 33'; Nwobodo (yellow card) 38'; Chirilă (yellow card) 68'; Jabbari 86', 90+2'	Stadium: Estadio Cibao FC; Attendance: 252; Referee: Steffon Dewar (Jamaica)

February 25 Second leg	FC Cincinnati (United States)	9–0 (13–0 agg.)	(Dominican Republic) O&M	Cincinnati, Ohio
7:00 p.m. EST	Mboma Dem 18', 58'; Valenzuela 27'; Castillo 33' (o.g.); Barlow 35'; Chávez 48'; Jimenez 68'; Powell 78'; Chirilă 86'	Report	Abreu (yellow card) 83'; Ramírez (red card) 82'	Stadium: TQL Stadium; Attendance: 11,114; Referee: Katia García (Mexico)

==== Round of 16 ====
March 12 First leg	FC Cincinnati (United States)	3–0	(Mexico) UANL	Cincinnati, Ohio
8:00 p.m. EDT	Denkey 6', 83'; Barlow (yellow card) 26', (goal) 53'; Nwobodo (yellow card) 29'; Bucha (yellow card) 90'; Anunga (yellow card) 90+2'	Report	Garza (yellow card) 49'	Stadium: TQL Stadium; Attendance: 9,257; Referee: Steven Madrigal (Costa Rica)

March 19 Second leg	UANL (Mexico)	5–1 (5–4 agg.)	(United States) FC Cincinnati	San Nicolás de los Garza, Mexico
9:00 p.m. EDT	Aguirre 5', 49'; Herrera 10', 46'; Correa (yellow card) 15'; Guzmán (yellow card) 24'; Araújo (yellow card) 61'; Lainez (yellow card) 68'; Gorriarán 90+8', (yellow card) 90+10'; López (yellow card) 90+11'	Report	Flores (yellow card) 20'; Hadebe (yellow card) 24'; Miazga (yellow card) 64'; Denkey 65'; Anunga (yellow card) 87'	Stadium: Estadio Universitario; Referee: Mario Escobar (Guatemala)

=== Leagues Cup ===
==== League phase ====
Pos	Team	Pld	W	PW	PL	L	GF	GA	GD	Pts
6	Charlotte FC	3	2	0	0	1	5	1	+4	6
7	Portland Timbers	3	2	0	0	1	9	6	+3	6
8	FC Cincinnati	3	2	0	0	1	6	3	+3	6
9	FC Dallas	3	2	0	0	1	4	3	+1	6
10	San Diego FC	3	2	0	0	1	5	5	0	6

Source: Leagues Cup

August 4 1	FC Cincinnati (United States)	3–1	(Mexico) Pachuca	Cincinnati, Ohio
7:30 p.m. EDT	Evander 18', (yellow card) 76'; Bucha 39'; Anunga (yellow card) 51'; Valenzuela (yellow card) 68'; Dem 70'	Report	Alcaraz 7'; Sánchez (yellow card) 15'; Barreto (yellow card) 30'	Stadium: TQL Stadium; Attendance: 23,687; Referee: Oshane Nation (Jamaica)

August 7 2	FC Cincinnati (United States)	2–0	(Mexico) UNAM	Cincinnati, Ohio
8:00 p.m. EDT	Nwobodo (yellow card) 42'; Bucha 45+1'; Dem 90+3'	Report		Stadium: TQL Stadium; Attendance: 20,767; Referee: Oliver Vergara (Panama)

August 11 3	FC Cincinnati (United States)	1–2	(Mexico) Atlas	Cincinnati, Ohio
8:00 p.m. EDT	B. Ramírez (yellow card) 33'; Evander 44'	Report	P. Ramírez (yellow card) 77'; Monzón 79'; Serrato 85'	Stadium: TQL Stadium; Attendance: 15,765; Referee: Fernando Hernández (Mexico)
