= Kenji Mboma Dem =

French footballer (born 2002)

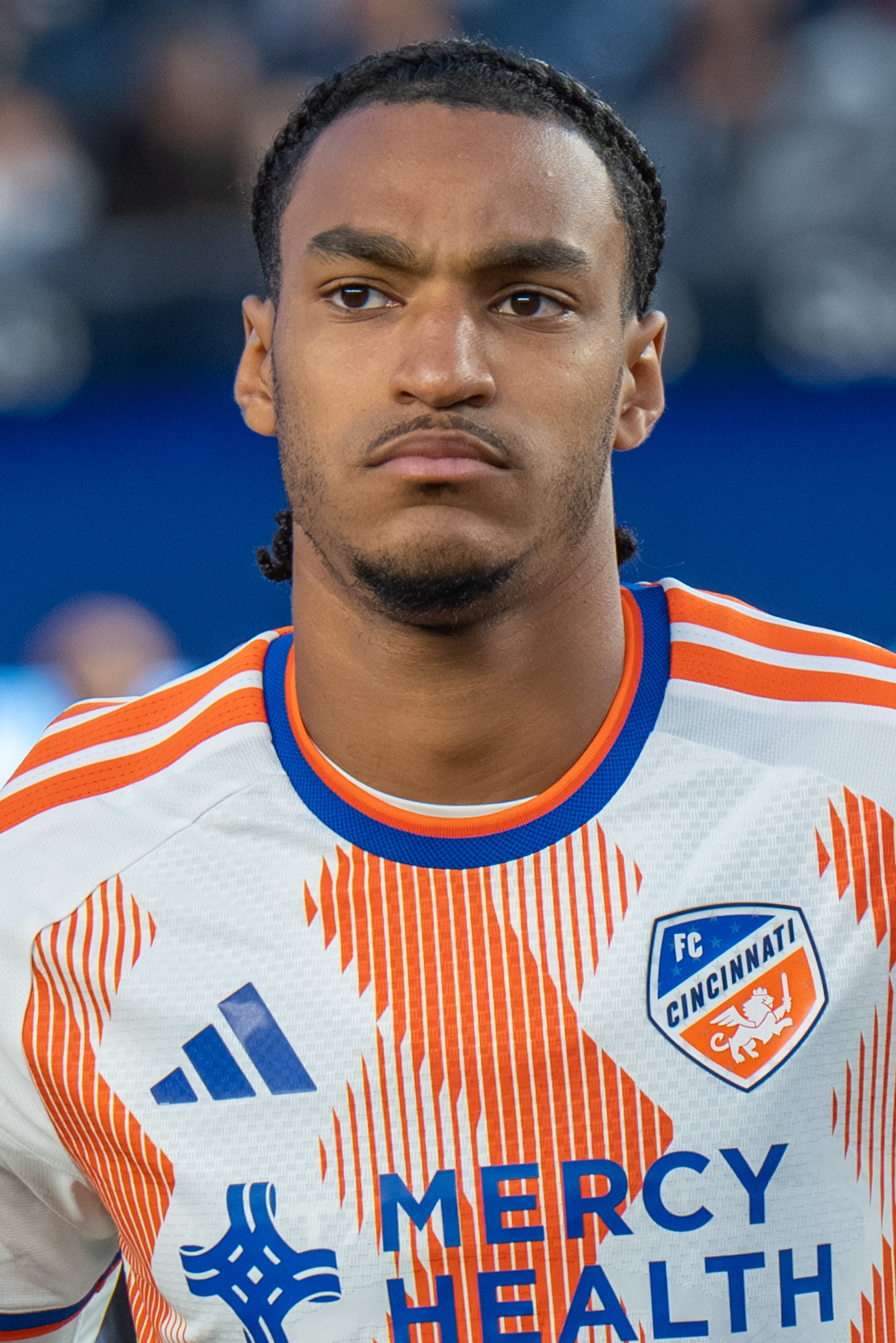
- Mboma Dem with FC Cincinnati in 2026

Personal information
- Date of birth: 22 January 2002 (age 24)
- Place of birth: Mantes-la-Jolie, France
- Height: 1.85 m (6 ft 1 in)
- Position: Forward

Team information
- Current team: FC Cincinnati
- Number: 17

Youth career
- Paris Saint-Germain
- Black Rock FC

College career
Years	Team	Apps	(Gls)
2020–2022	Omaha Mavericks	42	(12)
2023	Dayton Flyers	15	(9)

Senior career*
Years	Team	Apps	(Gls)
2024–2025	FC Cincinnati 2	26	(10)
2025	→ FC Cincinnati (loan)	1	(0)
2025–	FC Cincinnati	31	(6)
2025	→ FC Cincinnati 2 (loan)	10	(4)
- * Club domestic league appearances and goals as of 00:06, 8 November 2026 (UTC)

Kenji Mboma Dem (born 22 January 2002) is a French professional footballer who plays as a forward for Major League Soccer club FC Cincinnati.

Mboma Dem is an alumnus of the Omaha Mavericks and Dayton Flyers soccer programs, and was picked 57th overall in the second round of the 2024 MLS SuperDraft by FC Cincinnati.

== Early career ==
Mboma Dem trained with the Paris Saint-Germain academy. Mboma Dem later attended Northwood School in Lake Placid, New York, United States, where he helped his school to advance to the semi-finals of the U-19 Dallas Cup in 2018, and a year later he scored 26 goals during the U-19 IMG Cup, which his school ultimately won. Mboma Dem graduated from Northwood School in 2020. Mboma Dem also spent time in the academy of USL League Two club Black Rock FC.

=== Omaha Mavericks ===
Later in 2020, Mboma Dem began attending the University of Nebraska Omaha and joined the school's men's soccer team. On 22 February 2021, Mboma Dem made his college debut, playing 70 minutes of a 3–1 loss to the Kansas City Roos. Three games later, Mboma Dem made his first college goal contribution when he provided an assist to Hugo Kametani in a 4–1 win over the Western Illinois Leathernecks on 6 March. In the following game, Mboma Dem scored his first goal of his collegiate career in a 2–0 win over the Eastern Illinois Panthers on 18 March, followed by one goal each in the following two matches against the Eastern Illinois Panthers again and Kansas City Roos. In total throughout his first season, Mboma Dem scored three goals and provided one assist, and he was named to the All-Summit Second Team and the All-Summit Newcomer Team.

In Mboma Dem's second season, his offensive output increased marginally to three goals and three assists, and he was named to the All-Summit Tournament Team and All-Summit First Team for his performance during the 2021 Summit League men's soccer tournament. While with the Omaha Mavericks, Mboma Dem joined the Legends of Africa squad for a friendly match against former Niger national team players at Stade Général Seyni Kountché in Niamey, Niger, in December 2021. The Legends of Africa squad defeated Niger 4–3.

The following season, Mboma Dem scored his first collegiate brace in a 3–1 win at the Oakland Golden Grizzlies on 28 August 2022. At the conclusion of his final season with the Mavericks, Mboma Dem scored six goals and made eight assists, and was again named to the All-Summit Second Team.

=== Dayton Flyers ===
Mboma Dem transferred to the University of Dayton during his senior year, and joined the school's soccer team, the Dayton Flyers. Mboma Dem said that he transferred to Dayton in order to increase his exposure to Major League Soccer teams and because of the team's playing style. On 10 September 2023, Mboma Dem scored his first goals for the Dayton Flyers when he converted two in a 6–0 win at the Rhode Island Rams. Mboma Dem would score nine goals, three of which were braces, and make three assists during his final season of collegiate soccer. The Dayton Flyers won the Atlantic 10 Championship final in a 2–1 win over the VCU Rams on 13 November 2023. For his performance throughout the tournament, Mboma Dem was named the Most Outstanding Performer. Additionally, Mboma Dem was named to the First Team All-Atlantic.

== Club career ==
=== FC Cincinnati 2 ===
On 20 December 2023, Mboma Dem was selected in the 2023 MLS SuperDraft by FC Cincinnati as the 57th overall pick in the second round. Mboma Dem said that in the lead up to the draft, he was hoping to be selected by FC Cincinnati. On 17 April 2024, Mboma Dem signed with FC Cincinnati's reserve team, FC Cincinnati 2, in MLS Next Pro ahead of the upcoming 2024 MLS Next Pro season. Four days later, Mboma Dem made his professional debut when he started against Atlanta United 2, but was taken off in the 32nd-minute for Ben Stitz as FC Cincinnati 2 won 4–1. Mboma Dem returned to FC Cincinnati 2's squad on 6 June in a match against Philadelphia Union II, and scored a brace, which would ultimately be the only goals of the match. In total, Mboma Dem made 19 appearances and scored seven goals and made five assists during his first professional season of football.

On 26 February 2025, Mboma Dem signed a short-term agreement with FC Cincinnati to make him available for a 2025 CONCACAF Champions Cup match against Motagua and a league match against the Philadelphia Union. The same day as the announcement, Mboma Dem made his debut for FC Cincinnati when he came on as a 79th-minute substitute for Pavel Bucha in a 1–1 draw against Motagua, securing a 5–2 aggregate win. In the Philadelphia Union match on 1 March, Mboma Dem made his league debut as an 85th-minute substitute for Lukas Engel as FC Cincinnati lost 4–1.

=== FC Cincinnati ===
On 5 July 2025, Mboma Dem signed a contract with FC Cincinnati through the remainder of the 2025 Major League Soccer season, with a team option for the next two seasons. At the time of Mboma Dem's signing, he had made eight appearances and scored three goals with FC Cincinnati 2 in the 2025 MLS Next Pro season. On 14 September, Mboma Dem returned to FC Cincinnati 2 on loan through the remainder of the season after making four appearances with the senior team, and with them he scored four goals and made two assists across 11 more appearances. On 26 November, FC Cincinnati announced that it had exercised Mboma Dem's contract option.

On 25 February 2026, Mboma Dem scored his first goals for the senior team, when he scored a brace in a 9–0 win over O&M in the 2026 CONCACAF Champions Cup, helping to secure a 13–0 win on aggregate. On 11 April, Mboma Dem entered as a 88th-minute substitute for Bryan Ramírez while FC Cincinnati were down one player due to a 71st-minute second yellow card for Kévin Denkey in a match against Toronto FC. Despite being a man down, Mboma Dem scored in the second minute of stoppage time to secure a 1–1 draw, his first league goal for FC Cincinnati. On 23 May, Mboma Dem scored his first league brace for FC Cincinnati in a 6–2 win over Orlando City, and as a result of his performance he was named to the Team of the Matchday bench for the first time in his career.

== Personal life ==
Kenji Mboma Dem is the fourth of five children of Cameroon international footballer Patrick Mboma. Mboma Dem's older siblings are considerably older than him, with his two brothers being nine and seven years older respectively. Mboma Dem started playing with footballs when he learned to walk, and would play football in the backyard of their home in Paris with his siblings. Mboma Dem's brothers stopped playing football competitively in their teens, and Mboma Dem said that their father never pressured him or his siblings to play football, rather telling them to pursue whatever they wanted to do in their lives.

== Career statistics ==
As of match played 7 November 2026

Appearances and goals by club, season and division
Club	Season	League			Playoffs		National cup (Note: Includes U.S. Open Cup.)		Continental		Other		Total	
Club	Season	Division	Apps	Goals	Apps	Goals	Apps	Goals	Apps	Goals	Apps	Goals	Apps	Goals
FC Cincinnati 2	2024	MLS Next Pro	18	7	1	0	—		—		—		19	7
FC Cincinnati 2	2025	MLSNP	8	3	—		1	0	—		—		9	3
FC Cincinnati 2	Total		26	10	1	0	1	0	—		—		28	10
FC Cincinnati (loan)	2025	MLS	1	0	—		—		1 (Note: Appearance(s) in CONCACAF Champions Cup)	0	—		2	0
FC Cincinnati	2025	MLS	3	0	—		—		—		1 (Note: Appearance in Leagues Cup)	0	4	0
FC Cincinnati	2026	MLS	28	6	—		—		2	2	3	2	33	10
FC Cincinnati	Total		31	6	—		—		2	2	4	2	37	10
FC Cincinnati 2 (loan)	2025	MLSNP	10	4	1	0	—		—		—		11	4
Career total			68	20	2	0	1	0	3	2	4	1	78	24

== Honours ==
Dayton Flyers

- Atlantic 10 Conference men's soccer tournament: 2023
