= Ender Echenique =

Venezuelan footballer (born 2004)

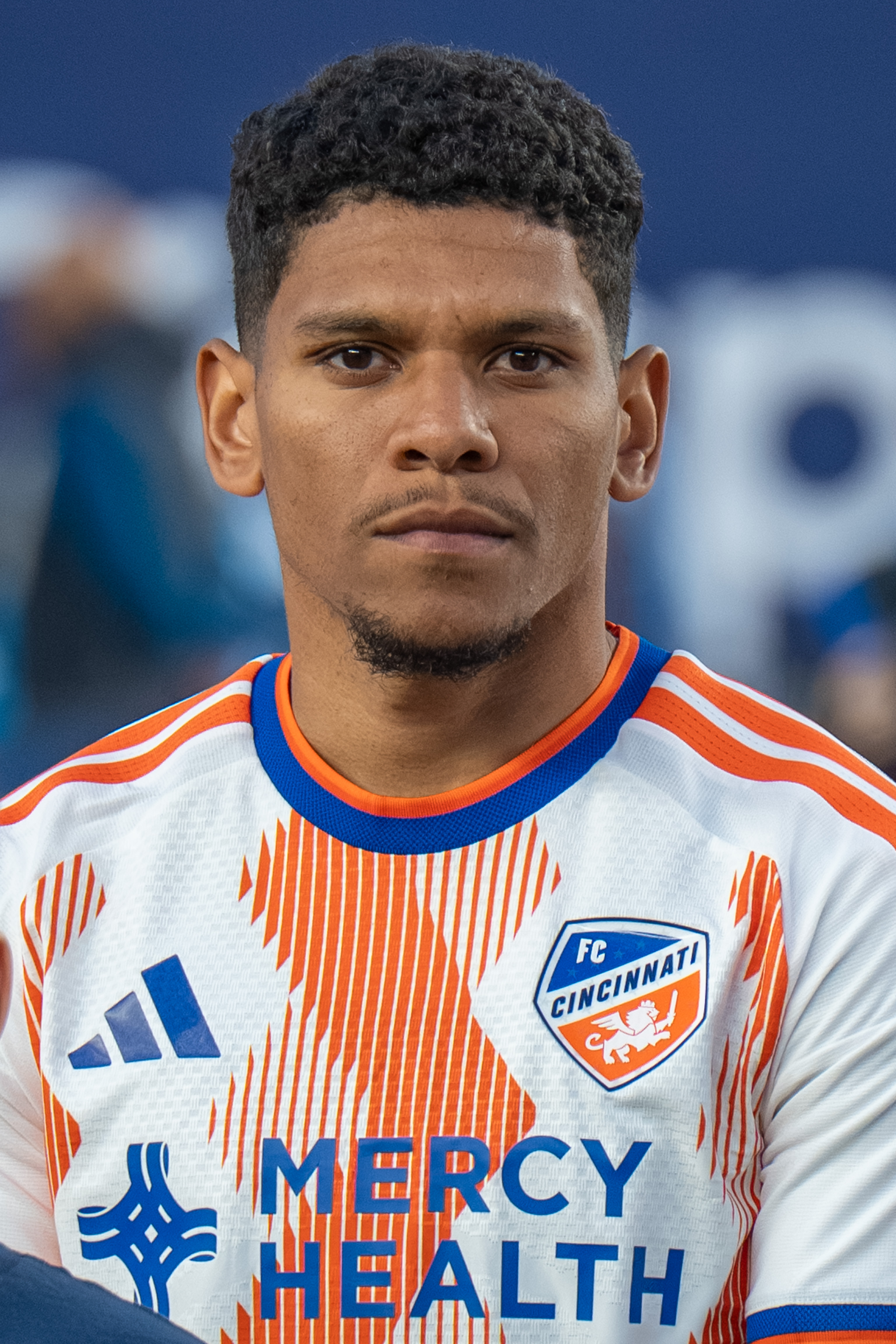
- Echenique with FC Cincinnati in 2026

Personal information
- Full name: Ender Jesús Echenique Peña
- Date of birth: 2 April 2004 (age 22)
- Place of birth: Maracay, Venezuela
- Height: 1.70 m (5 ft 7 in)
- Position: Forward

Team information
- Current team: FC Cincinnati
- Number: 66

Youth career
- –2019: Aragua

Senior career*
Years	Team	Apps	(Gls)
2020–2022	Aragua	20	(1)
2023–2025	Caracas	64	(11)
2025–	FC Cincinnati	36	(2)

International career^{‡}
2025–	Venezuela	4	(0)
- * Club domestic league appearances and goals as of 22:32, 15 November 2026 (UTC) ‡ National team caps and goals as of 02:30, 11 June 2026 (UTC)

Ender Jesús Echenique Peña (born 2 April 2004) is a Venezuelan professional footballer who plays as a forward for Major League Soccer club FC Cincinnati and the Venezuela national team.

== Club career ==
=== Aragua F. C. ===
Echenique grew up in the youth academy of Aragua where he made his debut on 25 October 2020 in a 2–2 Primera División draw against Metropolitanos. He scored his first goal on 24 July 2022 in a 2–2 draw against Deportivo Lara.

=== Caracas F. C. ===
In 2023 he was purchased outright by Caracas.

=== F. C. Cincinnati ===
On 31 July 2025, it was announced that Echenique had signed a contract with FC Cincinnati of Major League Soccer.

== Career statistics ==
=== Club ===
As of match played 7 November 2026

Appearances and goals by club, season and competition
Club	Season	League			National cup (Note: Includes Copa Venezuela)		Continental		Other		Total	
Club	Season	League	Apps	Goals	Apps	Goals	Apps	Goals	Apps	Goals	Apps	Goals
Aragua	2020	Liga FUTVE	4	0	–		–		–		4	0
Aragua	2021	Liga FUTVE	4	0	–		–		–		4	0
Aragua	2022	Liga FUTVE	12	1	–		–		–		12	1
Aragua	Total		20	1	—		—		—		20	1
Caracas	2023	Liga FUTVE	23	3	–		–		–		23	3
Caracas	2024	Liga FUTVE	29	4	3	1	5 (Note: Appearances in Copa Libertadores)	1	–		37	6
Caracas	2025	Liga FUTVE	12	4	1	0	7 (Note: Appearances in Copa Sudamericana)	3	–		20	7
Caracas	Total		64	11	4	1	12	4	—		80	16
FC Cincinnati	2025	MLS	8	1	–		–		6 (Note: Two appearances in Leagues Cup, four appearances in MLS Cup playoffs)	0	14	1
FC Cincinnati	2026	MLS	28	1	–		2 (Note: Appearances in CONCACAF Champions Cup)	0	3 (Note: Appearances in Leagues Cup)	0	33	1
FC Cincinnati	Total		36	2	—		2	0	9	0	47	2
Career total			120	14	4	1	14	4	9	0	147	19

=== International ===
As of 10 June 2026

Appearances and goals by national team and year
National team	Year	Apps	Goals
Venezuela	2025	2	0
Venezuela	2026	2	0
Total		4	0

== Honours ==
Individual

- Venezuelan Primera División: 2023
