= Andrés Felipe Dávila =

Colombian footballer (born 2007)

Personal information
- Full name: Andrés Felipe Dávila Mosquera
- Date of birth: 1 February 2007 (age 19)
- Place of birth: Istmina, Colombia
- Position: Forward

Team information
- Current team: Independiente Medellín

Youth career
- 2018–2022: Sócrates Valencia FC
- 2022–2024: Independiente Medellín

Senior career*
Years	Team	Apps	(Gls)
2024	Independiente Medellín	5	(0)
2025	FC Cincinnati 2	0	(0)
- * Club domestic league appearances and goals as of 21:34, 15 October 2024 (UTC)

Andrés Felipe Dávila Mosquera (born 1 February 2007) is a Colombian professional footballer who plays as a forward for Independiente Medellín.

== Club career ==
At the age of 11, Dávila moved to the Sócrates Valencia FC academy and changed positions from midfielder to striker, and played for their U20s as a 14 year old. In 2022, he moved to the youth academy of Independiente Medellín. He made his professional debut with Independiente Medellín in a 3–2 Categoría Primera A win over Patriotas Boyacá on 18 April 2024. On 15 October 2024, he was named by English newspaper The Guardian as one of the best players born in 2007 worldwide.

Dávila joined FC Cincinnati's MLS Next Pro side FC Cincinnati 2 in February 2025.
