= Pavel Bucha =

Czech footballer (born 1998)

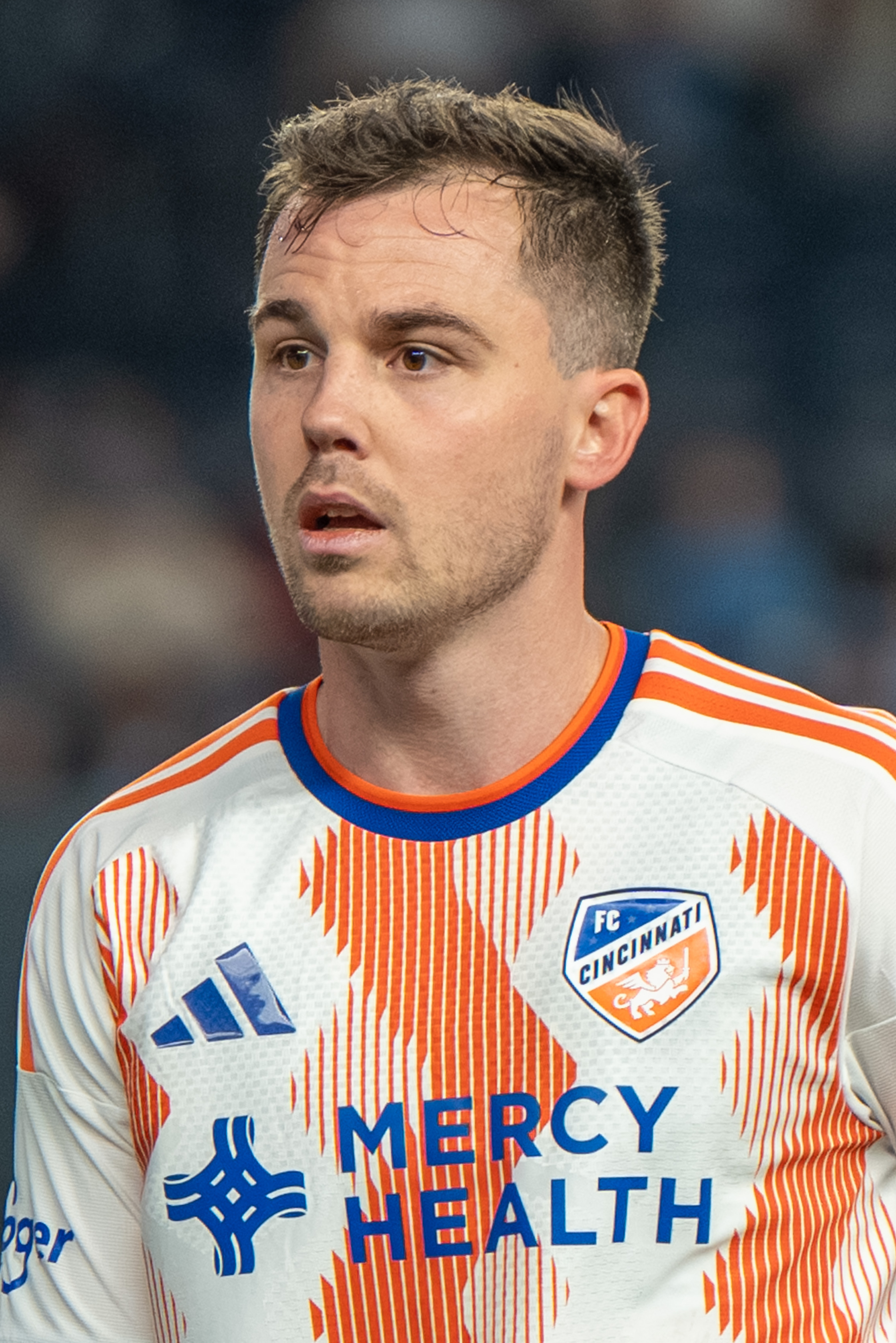
- Bucha with FC Cincinnati in 2026

Personal information
- Date of birth: 11 March 1998 (age 28)
- Place of birth: Nelahozeves, Czech Republic
- Height: 1.77 m (5 ft 10 in)
- Position: Midfielder

Team information
- Current team: FC Cincinnati
- Number: 20

Youth career
- Čechie Kralupy
- Neratovice
- Slavia Prague

Senior career*
Years	Team	Apps	(Gls)
2018	Slavia Prague	5	(0)
2018–2023	Viktoria Plzeň	121	(22)
2019	→ Mladá Boleslav (loan)	31	(7)
2024–	FC Cincinnati	98	(13)

International career^{‡}
2016	Czech Republic U19	1	(0)
2018	Czech Republic U20	3	(0)
2019–2021	Czech Republic U21	15	(2)
2026–	Czech Republic	2	(0)
- * Club domestic league appearances and goals as of 02:43, 9 November 2026 (UTC) ‡ National team caps and goals as of 3 October 2026

Pavel Bucha (born 11 March 1998) is a Czech professional footballer who plays as a midfielder for FC Cincinnati in Major League Soccer and the Czech Republic national team.

== Club career ==
He made his league debut in Slavia's Fortuna Liga 0–1 loss at Jihlava on 17 February 2018. In June 2018, he was sent back to the Slavia junior squad following his refusal to extend his contract. In July, Bucha terminated his contract with Slavia Prague on the grounds that removing him from the first team had constituted a breach of contract by the club. Immediately after, he signed a four-year deal with rivals Viktoria Plzeň.

On 7 February 2024, Bucha signed a contract with Major League Soccer club FC Cincinnati until 2026, with a club option for 2027.

== International career ==
In October 2021 he was called up to the senior Czech Republic squad and was on the bench against Belarus. He was again included in the national team squad for the 2026 FIFA World Cup qualification play-offs under coach Miroslav Koubek.

== Career statistics ==
=== Club ===
As of match played 7 November 2026

Club	Season	League			National cup (Note: Includes Czech Cup)		Continental		Other		Total	
Club	Season	Division	Apps	Goals	Apps	Goals	Apps	Goals	Apps	Goals	Apps	Goals
Slavia Prague	2017–18	Czech First League	5	0	—		—		—		5	0
Viktoria Plzeň	2018–19	Czech First League	—		2	0	—		—		2	0
Viktoria Plzeň	2019–20	Czech First League	14	4	2	0	—		—		16	4
Viktoria Plzeň	2020–21	Czech First League	26	7	4	1	3 (Note: One appearance in UEFA Champions League, two appearances in UEFA Europa League)	0	—		33	8
Viktoria Plzeň	2021–22	Czech First League	31	3	2	0	4 (Note: Appearances in UEFA Europa Conference League)	1	—		37	4
Viktoria Plzeň	2022–23	Czech First League	33	3	1	1	11 (Note: Appearances in UEFA Champions League)	1	—		45	5
Viktoria Plzeň	2023–24	Czech First League	17	5	2	0	11	1	—		30	6
Viktoria Plzeň	Total		121	22	13	2	29	3	—		163	27
Mladá Boleslav (loan)	2018–19	Czech First League	12	1	—		—		—		12	1
Mladá Boleslav (loan)	2019–20	Czech First League	19	6	1	1	4 (Note: Appearances in UEFA Europa League)	0	—		24	7
Mladá Boleslav (loan)	Total		31	7	1	1	4	0	—		36	8
FC Cincinnati	2024	MLS	33	4	—		3 (Note: Appearances in CONCACAF Champions Cup)	0	7 (Note: Four appearances and two goals in Leagues Cup, three appearances in MLS Cup playoffs)	2	43	6
FC Cincinnati	2025	MLS	33	3	—		4	3	7 (Note: Three appearances and one goal in Leagues Cup, four appearances in MLS Cup playoffs)	1	44	7
FC Cincinnati	2026	MLS	32	6	—		3	0	3 (Note: Appearances in Leagues Cup)	2	38	8
FC Cincinnati	Total		98	13	—		10	3	17	5	125	21
Career total			255	42	14	3	43	6	17	5	329	56

=== International ===
As of match played 3 October 2026

Appearances and goals by national team and year
National team	Year	Apps	Goals
Czech Republic	2026	2	0
Total		2	0

== Honours ==
Viktoria Plzeň

- Czech First League: 2021–22

Individual

- Czech First League Young Player of the Year: 2019–20
