= Samuel Gidi =

Slovak footballer (born 2004)

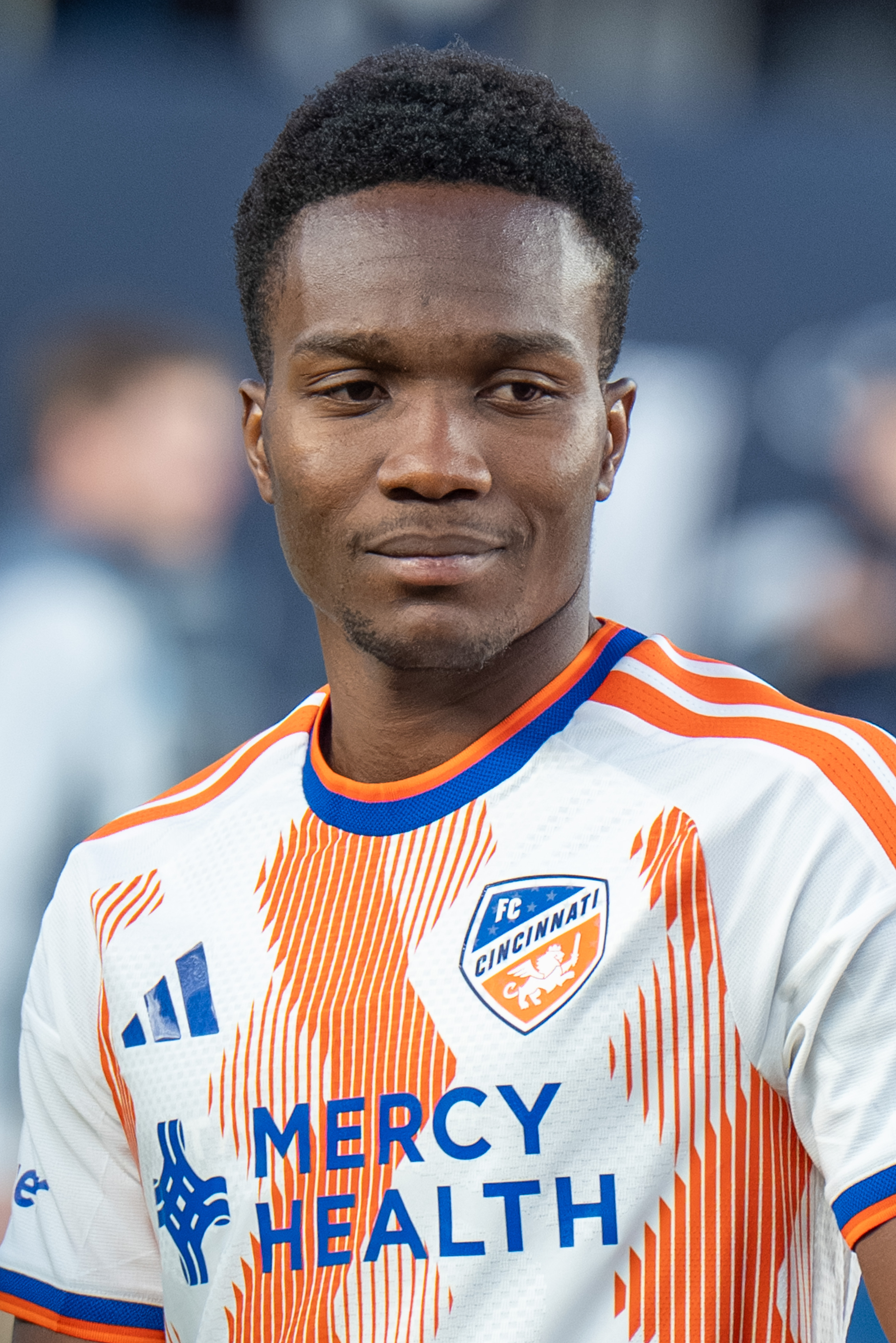
- Gidi with FC Cincinnati in 2026

Personal information
- Full name: Samuel Mawuena Gidi
- Date of birth: 15 April 2004 (age 22)
- Place of birth: Accra, Ghana
- Height: 1.78 m (5 ft 10 in)
- Positions: Defensive midfielder; centre-back

Team information
- Current team: FC Cincinnati
- Number: 11

Youth career
- –2022: Žilina Africa
- 2022: Žilina U19

Senior career*
Years	Team	Apps	(Gls)
2022	Žilina B	1	(2)
2022–2025	Žilina	93	(6)
2025–	FC Cincinnati	36	(1)

International career^{‡}
2025–2026	Slovakia U21	6	(0)
- * Club domestic league appearances and goals as of 02:48, 29 October 2026 (UTC) ‡ National team caps and goals as of 01:56, 31 May 2026 (UTC)

Samuel Gidi (born 15 April 2004) is a professional footballer who plays as a defensive midfielder or centre-back for Major League Soccer club FC Cincinnati. Born in Ghana, he has represented Slovakia at the youth level.

== Early life ==
Gidi was born on 15 April 2004 in Accra. He developed at the New Life Football Academy and switched to Žilina Africa academy at age 15. In 2022, he was transferred to MŠK Žilina in Slovakia.

== Club career ==
=== MŠK Žilina ===
Gidi made his first-team Fortuna Liga debut for Žilina against AS Trenčín on 16 July 2022. He made his first contribution in a 4–1 win against Dukla Banská Bystrica, providing a goal and an assist.

=== FC Cincinnati ===
Gidi was acquired by MLS outfit FC Cincinnati on 19 August 2025 for an undisclosed fee.

== Personal life ==
In August 2025, Gidi acquired Slovak citizenship.
