= Gilberto Flores (footballer, born 2003) =

Paraguayan footballer (born 2003)

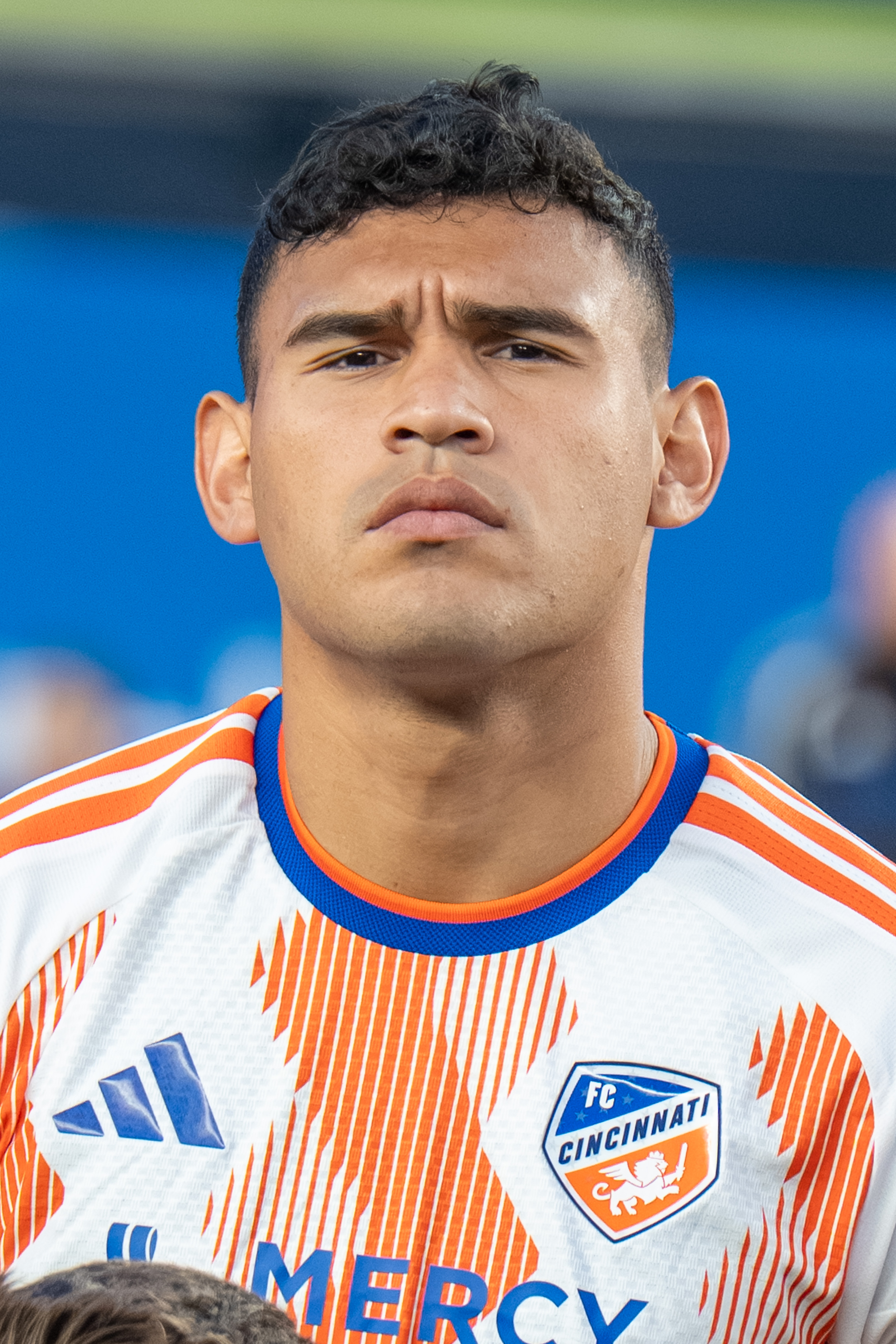
- Flores with FC Cincinnati in 2026

Personal information
- Full name: Gilberto Ivan Flores Melgarejo
- Date of birth: 1 April 2003 (age 23)
- Place of birth: Asunción, Paraguay
- Height: 6 ft 0 in (1.83 m)
- Position: Defender

Team information
- Current team: FC Cincinnati
- Number: 3

Senior career*
Years	Team	Apps	(Gls)
2022–2024	Libertad	7	(0)
2024	→ Sportivo Trinidense (loan)	25	(0)
2025–	FC Cincinnati	23	(0)
2025–	FC Cincinnati 2	3	(1)
2026–	→ Libertad (loan)	4	(0)

International career^{‡}
2022–2023	Paraguay U20	13	(2)
2024–	Paraguay U23	16	(0)
- * Club domestic league appearances and goals as of 17:06, 3 September 2026 (UTC) ‡ National team caps and goals as of 18:19, 25 July 2026 (UTC)

Gilberto Ivan Flores Melgarejo (born 1 April 2003) is a Paraguayan footballer who plays for Club Libertad, on loan from Major League Soccer side FC Cincinnati. He is a Paraguay U23 international.

== Club career ==
He made his Paraguayan Primera División debut for Club Libertad on 3 April 2022, at the age of 19 years-old, in his team's 3-2 victory against Guaireña. He went on to make three further appearances for the club that season and three more the following season. He spent the 2024 season on loan at Sportivo Trinidense. He scored his first goal for the club in the Copa Sudamericana against Colo-Colo in March 2024.

After returning to Club Libertad in January 2025, he was linked with a move to Major League Soccer club FC Cincinnati. His contract with Cincinnati, which lasts through 2027 with options for 2028 and 2029, was made official on 31 January 2025.

On 24 July 2026, FC Cincinnati announced that Flores had been loaned back to Club Libertad through June 2027 with a club option to buy.

== International career ==
In January 2023, he was selected for the Paraguay U20 squad for the South America U20 Championships. He was selected for the Paraguay U23 squad for the 2024 Olympic Games.

== Honours ==
Paraguay U20

- South American Games: 2022
