= Ayoub Jabbari =

Moroccan footballer (born 2000)

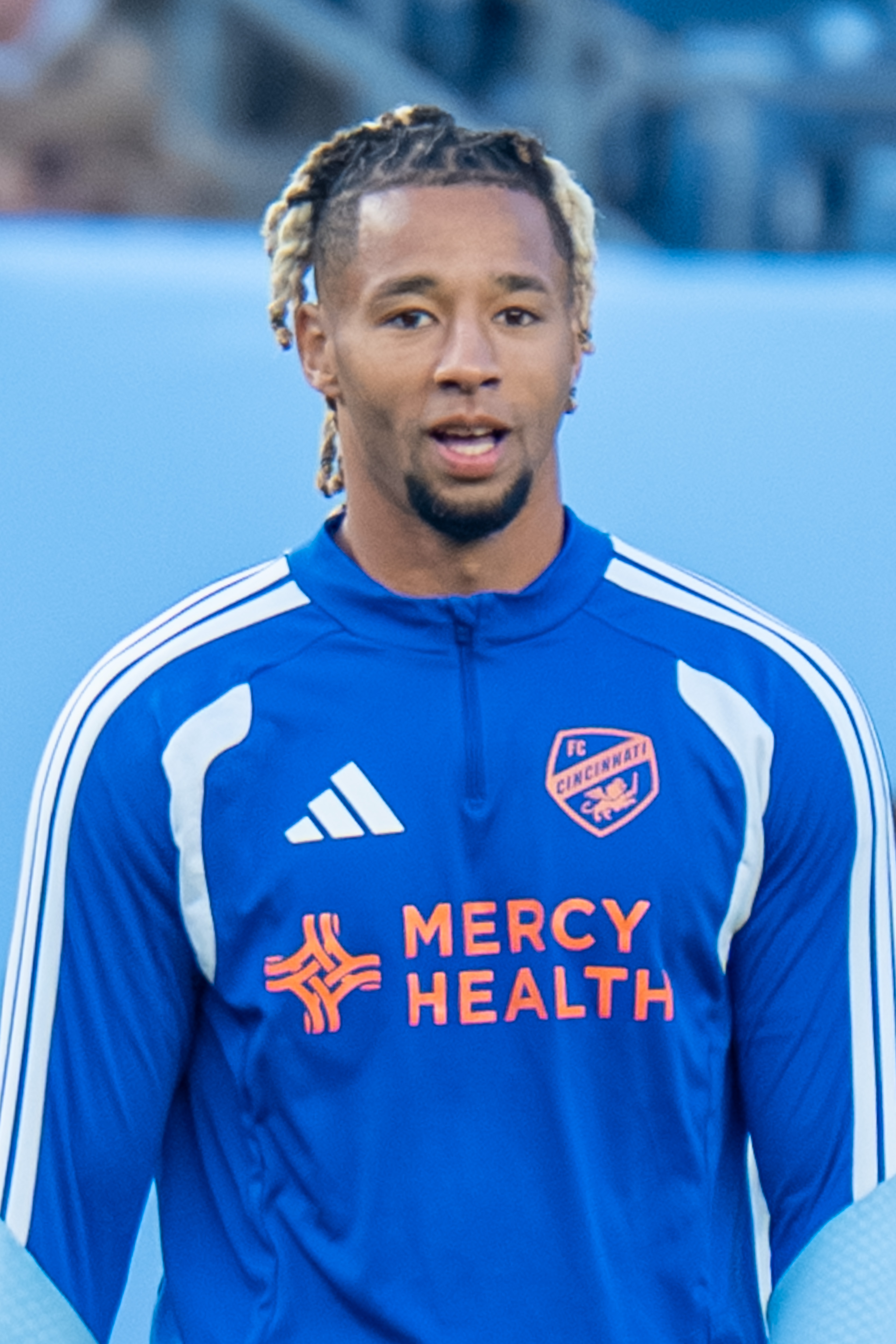
- Jabbari with FC Cincinnati in 2026

Personal information
- Date of birth: 30 January 2000 (age 26)
- Place of birth: Rabat, Morocco
- Height: 1.96 m (6 ft 5 in)
- Position: Forward

Team information
- Current team: FC Cincinnati
- Number: 99

Youth career
- FAR Rabat

Senior career*
Years	Team	Apps	(Gls)
2020–2021	Caen B	8	(1)
2020–2021	→ Avranches (loan)	6	(0)
2022–2023	Racing B	33	(7)
2022–2023	Racing Santander	3	(0)
2023–2024	Paris FC	15	(2)
2024–2025	Grenoble	26	(3)
2025	→ FC Cincinnati (loan)	5	(0)
2026–	FC Cincinnati	28	(3)

International career
- Morocco U23
- * Club domestic league appearances and goals as of 22:28, 15 November 2026 (UTC)

Ayoub Jabbari (born 30 January 2000) is a Moroccan professional footballer who plays as a forward for FC Cincinnati of Major League Soccer.

== Club career ==
Born in Rabat, Morocco, Jabbari represented hometown side AS FAR before moving to C'Chartres Football on a trial period in 2019. On 12 February 2020, however, he signed a contract with SM Caen until 2023, being initially assigned to the reserve team in Championnat National 3.

On 14 December 2020, Jabbari was loaned to Championnat National side US Avranches until the end of the season. The following 31 August, he terminated his contract with Caen.

On 2 February 2022, Jabbari moved to Spain and joined Racing de Santander, being assigned to the B-side in Segunda División RFEF. He made his first team debut on 9 October, coming on as a late substitute for Matheus Aiás in a 1–0 Segunda División away win over Levante UD.

On 2 August 2025, Jabbari was loaned by FC Cincinnati of the Major League Soccer. On 12 December 2025, Cincinnati triggered the purchase option in the loan deal and made the transfer permanent, signing a three-year contract with Jabbari.

== Personal life ==
Jabbari's older brother Ahmed is also a footballer. A midfielder, he also represented Chartres.
