= Gerardo Valenzuela =

American soccer player (born 2004)

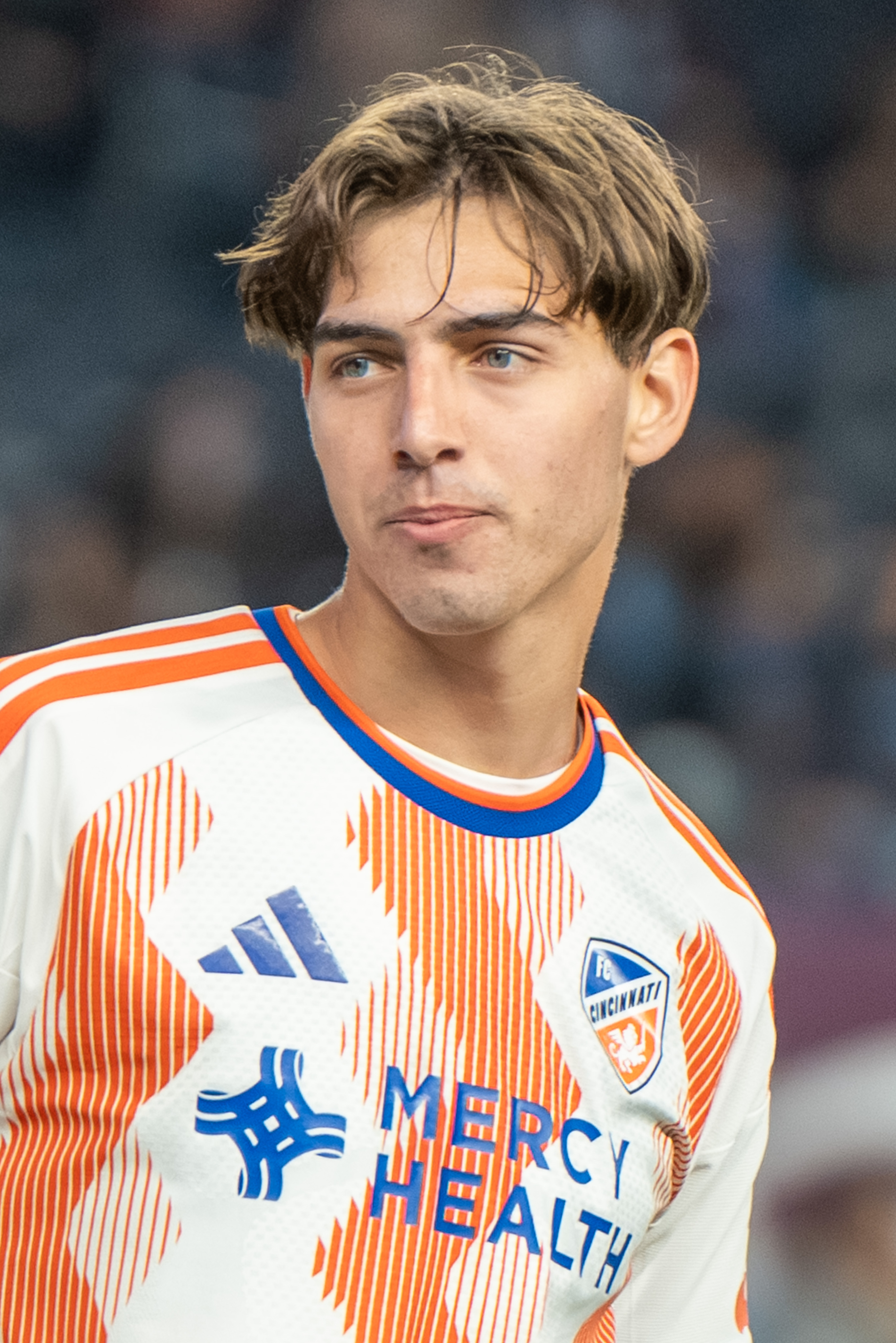
- Valenzuela with FC Cincinnati in 2026

Personal information
- Date of birth: September 28, 2004 (age 22)
- Place of birth: Boca Raton, Florida, United States
- Height: 6 ft 0 in (1.83 m)
- Position: Midfielder

Team information
- Current team: FC Cincinnati
- Number: 22

Youth career
- 2019–2020: Inter Miami
- 2020–2023: FC Cincinnati

Senior career*
| Years | Team | Apps | (Gls) |
| 2022– | FC Cincinnati 2 | 38 | (11) |
| 2023– | FC Cincinnati | 70 | (7) |

International career^{‡}
| 2025– | United States U23 | 1 | (0) |
- * Club domestic league appearances and goals as of 16:48, August 2, 2026 (UTC) ‡ National team caps and goals as of November 18, 2025

Gerardo Valenzuela (born September 28, 2004) is an American professional soccer player who plays as a midfielder for Major League Soccer club FC Cincinnati.

== Club career ==
Valenzuela joined the FC Cincinnati academy from Inter Miami in August 2020. He appeared for the club's MLS Next Pro side in 2022, before signing a three-year homegrown player contract with FC Cincinnati on May 25, 2023. He scored his first goal for the first team on July 6, 2024, netting against his former academy side Inter Miami during a 6–1 win.

== Honors ==
FC Cincinnati

- Supporters' Shield: 2023
