= List of FC Cincinnati seasons =

History of the American soccer club

FC Cincinnati is a professional soccer club based in Cincinnati, Ohio. The club competed in the United Soccer League (now known as the USL Championship) for three seasons before being granted expansion to first-division Major League Soccer for the 2019 season. This seasons list contains results for both iterations of the franchise, with totals including combined statistics from both eras.

== Key ==
Key to competitions

- Major League Soccer (MLS) – The top level of the United States soccer league system, established in 1996.
- United Soccer League (USL) – A lower division of the U.S. league system, established in 2010 and previously known as USL Pro, currently known as the USL Championship since 2019. The league was sanctioned as the third division of American soccer at the time of FC Cincinnati's entry in 2016, and elevated to second division status in 2017.
- U.S. Open Cup (USOC) – The primary domestic knockout cup competition in U.S. soccer, first contested in 1914.
- CONCACAF Champions Cup (CCC) – The premier competition in North American club soccer since 1962, formerly known as the CONCACAF Champions League.
- Leagues Cup (LC) – Competition between and among teams in MLS and Liga MX, the top level of soccer in Mexico. First held in 2019, it has featured varying formats in the years since.

Key to colors and symbols

1st or W	Winners
2nd or RU	Runners-up
3rd	Third place
Last	Last place
♦	League top scorer
	Highest average attendance
Italics	Competition not yet concluded

Key to league record

- Season = The year and article of the season
- Name = League name
- Pld = Games played
- W = Games won
- L = Games lost
- D = Games drawn
- GF = Goals for
- GA = Goals against
- GD = Goal difference
- Pts = Points
- PPG = Points per game
- Conf. = Conference position
- Overall = League position

Key to cup record

- DNE = Did not enter
- DNQ = Did not qualify
- TBD = To be determined
- NH = Competition not held or canceled
- QR = Qualifying round
- PR = Preliminary round
- GS = Group stage
- R1 = First round
- R2 = Second round
- R3 = Third round
- R4 = Fourth round
- R5 = Fifth round
- Ro32 = Round of 32
- Ro16 = Round of 16
- QF = Quarterfinals
- SF = Semifinals
- RU = Runners-up
- W = Winners

== Seasons ==
Season	League										Position		Playoffs	USOC	LC	Continental / Other		Average attendance (Note: Average attendance only includes statistics from regular season matches.)	Top goalscorer(s) (Note: Top goalscorer(s) includes all goals scored in League, Playoffs, U.S. Open Cup, Leagues Cup, and CONCACAF Champions Cup)	
Season	Name	Pld	W	L	D	GF	GA	GD	Pts	PPG	Conf.	Overall	Playoffs	USOC	LC	Continental / Other		Average attendance	Name(s)	Goals
2016	USL	30	16	6	8	41	27	+14	56	1.87	3rd	3rd	R1	R3	NH	N/A		17,296	Sean Okoli	16♦
2017	USL	32	12	10	10	46	48	−2	46	1.44	6th	14th	R1	SF	NH	DNQ		21,198	Baye Djiby Fall	16
2018	USL	34	23	3	8	72	34	+38	77	2.26	1st	1st	QF	R4	NH	DNQ		25,717	Emmanuel Ledesma	16
USL total		96	51	19	26	159	109	+50	179	1.86	—	—	—	—	—	—		21,404	Emmanuel Ledesma Danni König	22
2019	MLS	34	6	22	6	31	75	–44	24	0.71	12th	24th	DNQ	R16	DNQ	DNQ		27,336	Allan Cruz	7
2020	MLS	23	4	15	4	12	36	–24	16	0.70	14th	26th	DNQ	NH	NH	MLS is Back	Ro16	0 (Note: All matches cancelled or played without spectators due to the COVID-19 pandemic)	Yuya Kubo	3
2021	MLS	34	4	22	8	37	74	–37	20	0.59	14th	27th	DNQ	NH	DNQ	DNQ		21,157	Brenner	8
2022	MLS	34	12	9	13	64	56	+8	49	1.44	5th	10th	QF	R32	Showcase	DNQ		22,487	Brandon Vazquez	20
2023	MLS	34	20	5	9	57	39	+18	69	2.03	1st	1st	SF	SF	R32	DNQ		25,367	Luciano Acosta	21
2024	MLS	34	18	11	5	58	48	+10	59	1.74	3rd	5th	R1	DNE	R16	CCC	R16	25,237	Luciano Acosta	15
2025	MLS	34	20	9	5	52	40	+12	65	1.91	2nd	2nd	QF	DNE	League Phase	CCC	R16	24,668	Evander	22
MLS total		227	84	93	50	311	368	–57	302	1.33	—	—	—	—	—	—		24,375	Luciano Acosta	54
Combined total		323	135	112	76	470	477	–7	481	1.49	—	—	—	—	—	—		23,385	Luciano Acosta	54
