= FC Cincinnati =

American professional soccer club based in Cincinnati

- Full name: Football Club Cincinnati
- Nicknames: The Orange and Blue; The Knifey Lions; The Garys
- Short name: FC Cincinnati; FC Cincy; FCC
- Founded: August 12, 2015; 11 years ago
- Stadium: TQL Stadium; Cincinnati, Ohio
- Capacity: 25,513
- Owner: Carl Lindner III
- General manager: Chris Albright
- Head coach: Pat Noonan
- League: Major League Soccer
- 2026: Eastern Conference: 9th Overall: 17th Playoffs: TBD
- Website: fccincinnati.com
Home colors	Away colors

Football Club Cincinnati is an American professional soccer club based in Cincinnati. The club competes in Major League Soccer (MLS) as a member of the Eastern Conference. The team was first announced on August 12, 2015, as a United Soccer League (USL) franchise which played from 2016 to 2018. On May 29, 2018, the club's ownership was awarded an MLS franchise, and the team began MLS play on March 2, 2019. The club's ownership group is led by Carl Lindner III with Jeff Berding serving as co-CEO. Currently, the role of general manager is held by Chris Albright.

== History ==
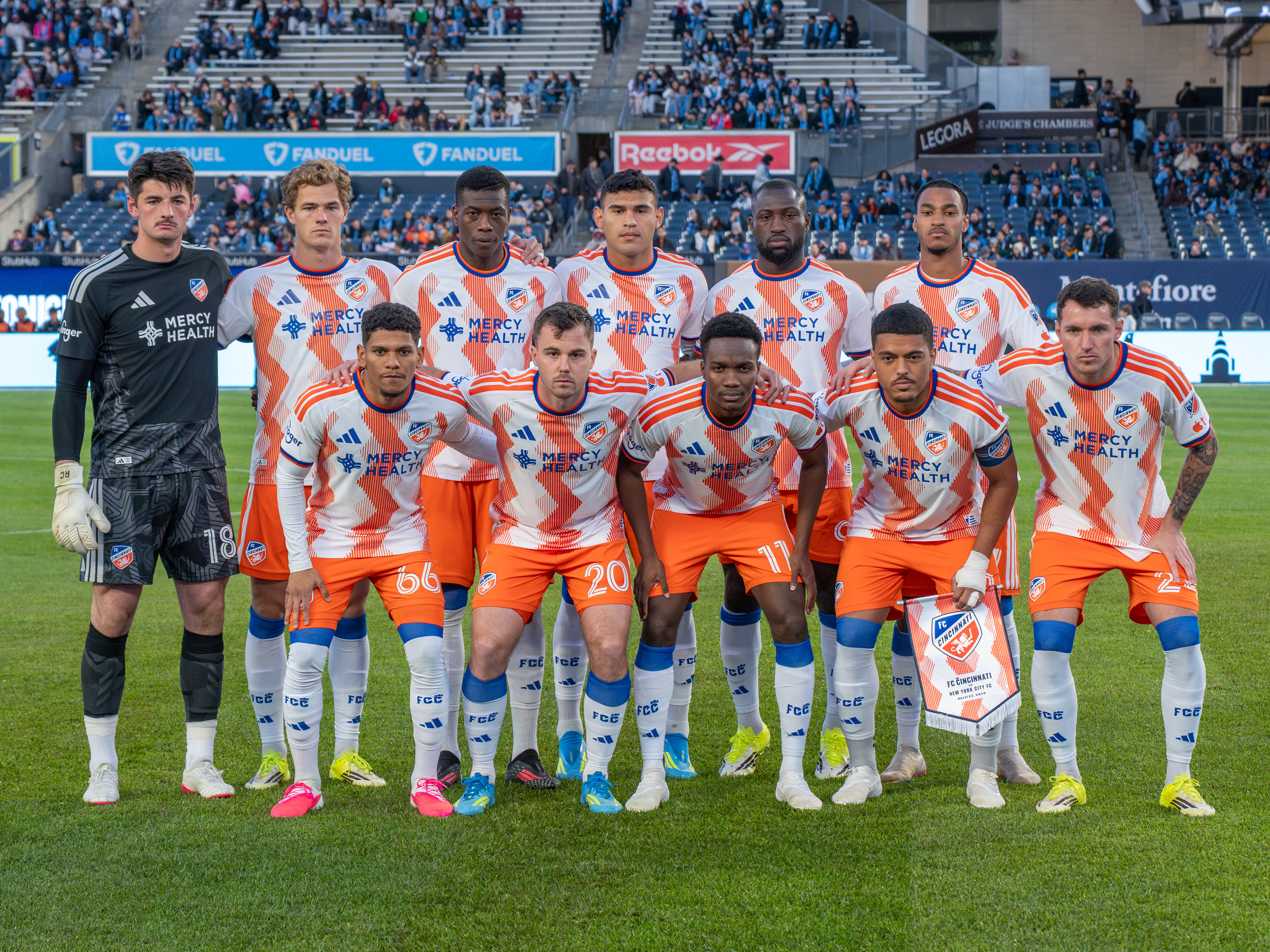
FC Cincinnati in 2026

=== United Soccer League era (2016–2018) ===
In May 2015, rumors of a new USL club in Cincinnati were reported by the media. There was speculation regarding the relationship the team would have with the Cincinnati Bengals, as well as a former Cincinnati soccer club, the Cincinnati Kings, as Jeff Berding was named as part of the ownership group. Berding was employed by the Bengals and on the board of the youth soccer club Kings Hammer FC. The Lindner family, of American Financial Group which is headquartered in Cincinnati, was reported as the owner of the new team with Carl Lindner III representing the owners at the press conference.

Then on August 12, 2015, FC Cincinnati announced that John Harkes would coach the new club and that the club would play in Nippert Stadium on the campus of the University of Cincinnati.

On April 16, 2016, FC Cincinnati broke the USL attendance record for a game, with 20,497 in attendance for the rivalry game against Louisville City FC, and, on May 14, against another rival Pittsburgh Riverhounds, broke its own record with 23,375 in attendance. On September 17, 2016, the team broke the USL record again, when they drew 24,376 for their game against Orlando City B. The team broke its own USL record once again on August 5, 2017, when they drew 25,308 for their game against Orlando City B.

On July 16, 2016, FC Cincinnati set the record for highest attendance at a soccer match in the state of Ohio when 35,061 people came for an exhibition game against Crystal Palace. This would later be broken on July 27, 2016, when an International Champions Cup match between Real Madrid and Paris Saint-Germain drew 86,641 people in Ohio Stadium in Columbus.

On October 2, 2016, FC Cincinnati hosted their first-ever playoff match against Charleston Battery, losing 2–1 in the quarterfinals of the 2016 USL playoffs. In the process, the club broke the playoff and single-game attendance record at 30,187.

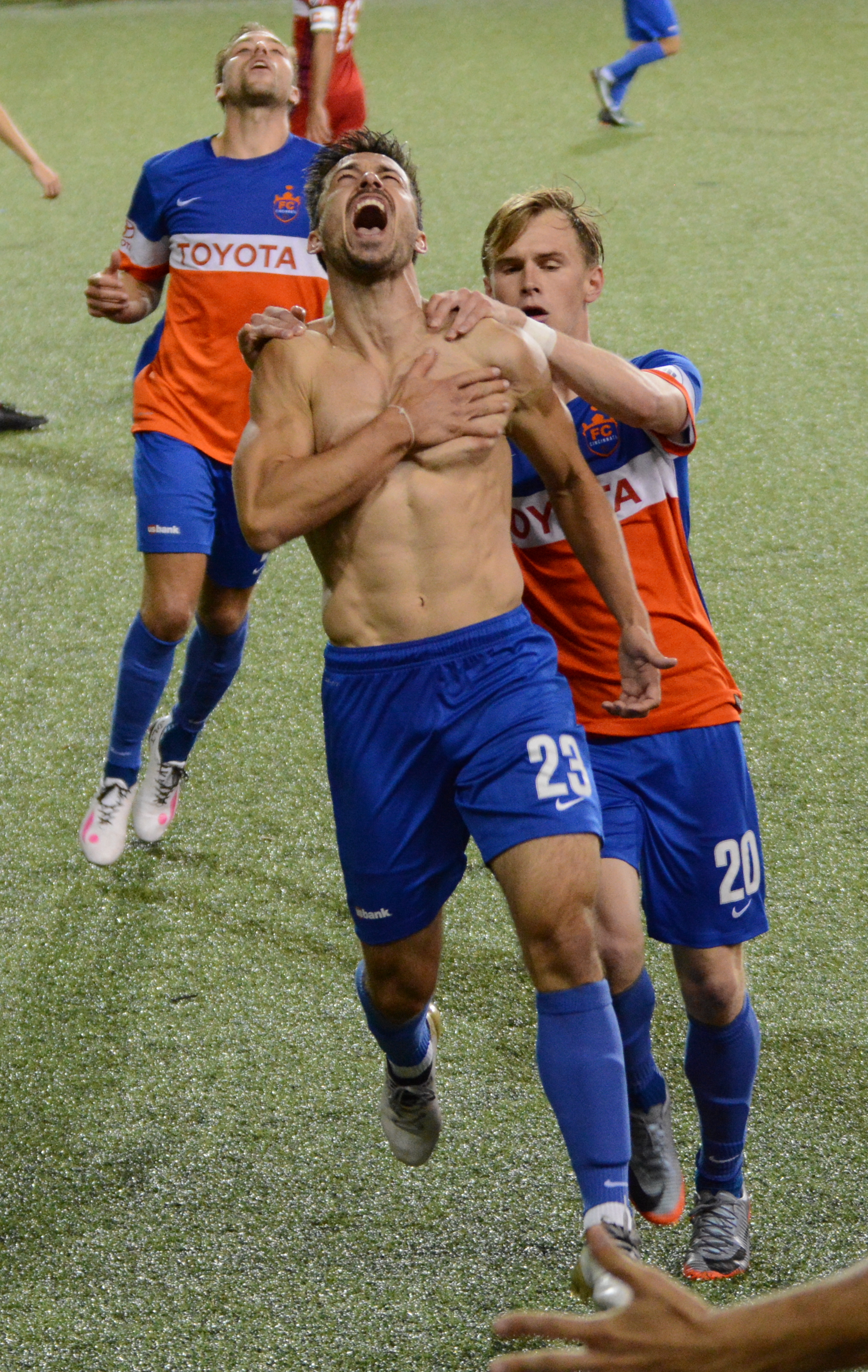
Andrew Wiedeman celebrates during FC Cincinnati's 2017 win over Chicago Fire.

On June 14, 2017, FC Cincinnati played their first match against a Major League Soccer team, Columbus Crew, during the Lamar Hunt U.S. Open Cup. Cincinnati won 1–0, with player Baye Djiby Fall scoring the only goal of the game. In the process, Cincinnati broke the attendance record for the U.S. Open Cup Fourth Round with 30,160 tickets sold, only 5,000 behind their club attendance record of 35,061.

On June 28, 2017, FC Cincinnati played their second match against a Major League Soccer team, Chicago Fire, in the Round of 16 during the Lamar Hunt U.S. Open Cup. Cincinnati would prevail 3–1 on penalty kicks after a 0–0 draw, with goalkeeper Mitch Hildebrandt stopping three of four penalty kicks. He totaled 10 saves during the match. The attendance of 32,287 was the second largest Modern Era crowd in U.S. Open Cup history. The match was televised nationally on ESPN.

On August 15, 2017, FC Cincinnati were defeated at home in front of a sold-out crowd by the New York Red Bulls 3–2 in the US Open Cup semi-final. FCC was leading 2–0 in the second half before eventually losing in extra time.

On April 7, 2018, the club played their first home game in a 1–0 loss to rival Louisville City.

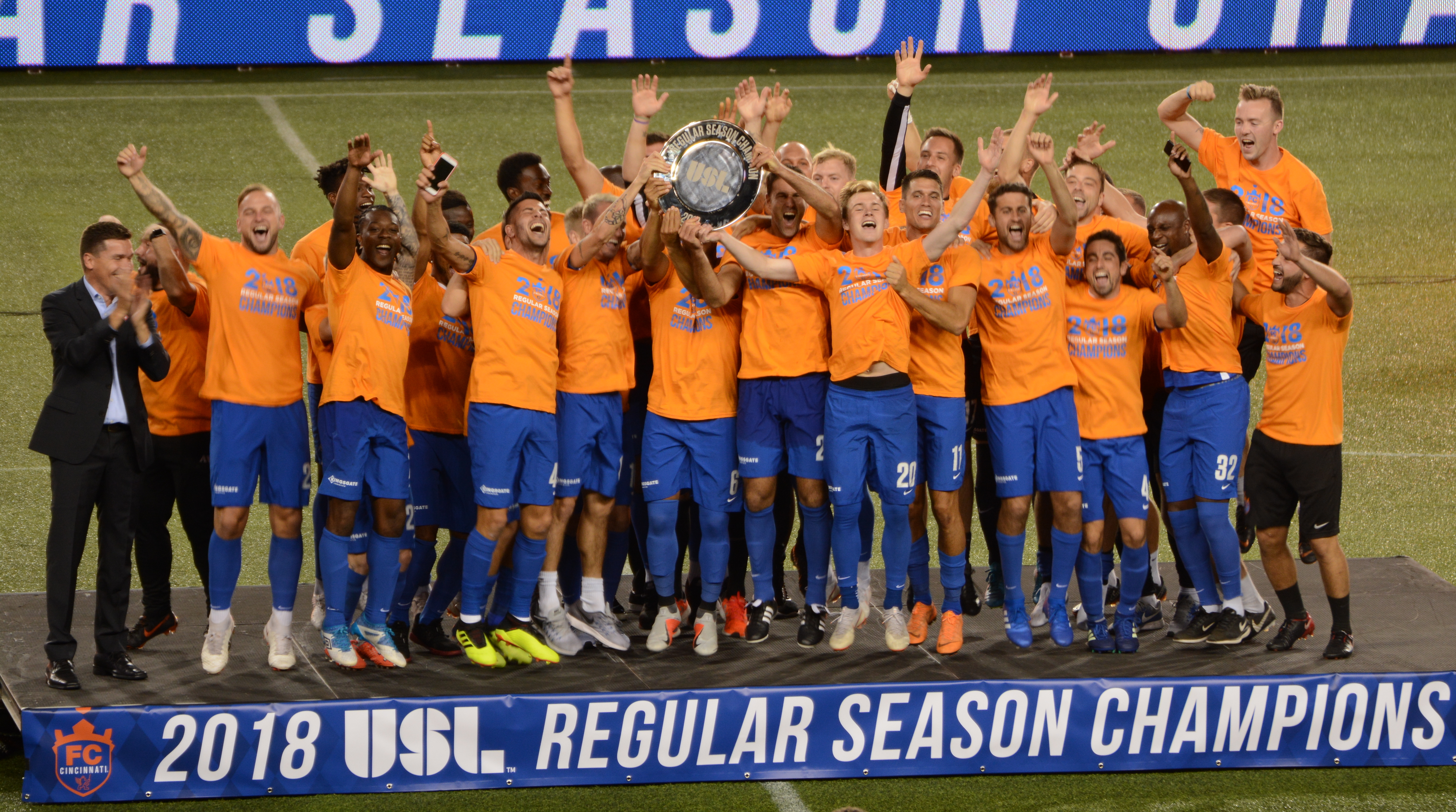
The players and staff celebrate clinching the 2018 USL regular season title.

On September 29, 2018, the club broke the USL attendance record once again in its final regular-season home match before its MLS move, drawing in 31,478 in a 3–0 win over rival Indy Eleven. After the match, they were awarded the USL regular season championship title, having clinched the trophy the prior week away to Richmond Kickers.

=== Major League Soccer expansion ===
The club owners began negotiations with Major League Soccer over a potential expansion franchise in early 2016, and Cincinnati was announced as one of ten cities that had expressed interest in the slots for teams 25 to 28. MLS commissioner Don Garber visited Cincinnati in December 2016 to tour Nippert Stadium and meet with city and club officials, complimenting the city and its fans. FC Cincinnati formally submitted its expansion bid in January 2017, including a shortlist of potential stadium locations.

On May 29, 2018, Major League Soccer announced that Cincinnati would join the league in 2019 as an expansion team under the FC Cincinnati brand. Don Garber is noted as saying, "If it wasn't for the stadium, for The Bailey, FC Cincinnati wouldn't have been in Major League Soccer." Plans for the development of TQL Stadium, a 26,000-seat soccer-specific venue in the West End set to open in 2021, were soon underway.

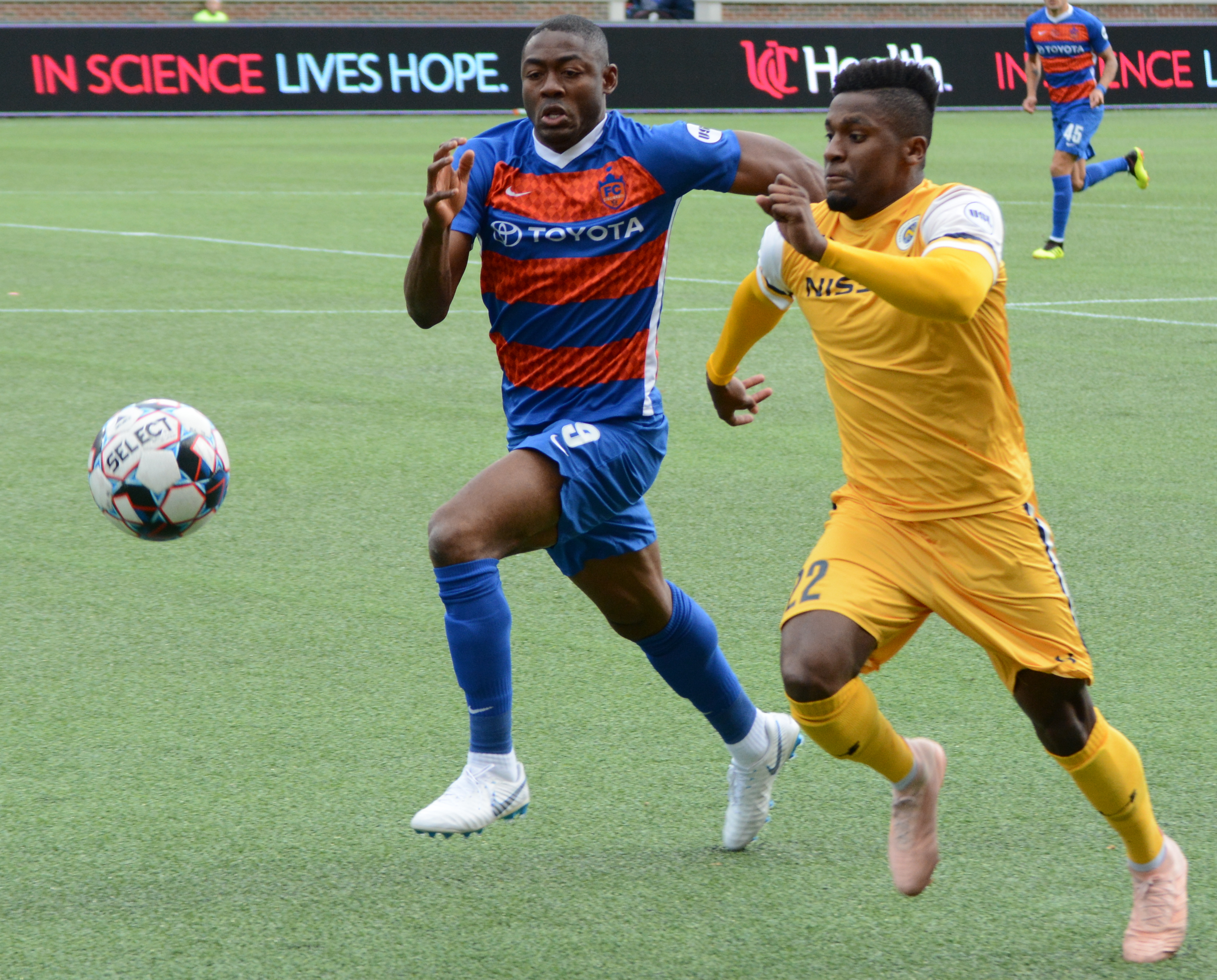
Fanendo Adi (left) was signed in July 2018 as the team's first Designated Player.

FC Cincinnati signed its first two MLS players, Fanendo Adi and Fatai Alashe, in July 2018. Adi was the team's first Designated Player. Both players were loaned to the FC Cincinnati USL team for the remainder of the 2018 season.

FC Cincinnati selected five players from certain MLS teams in the expansion draft, which took place on December 11, 2018. The players were Darren Mattocks (D.C United), Kei Kamara (Vancouver Whitecaps FC), Roland Lamah (FC Dallas), Eric Alexander (Houston Dynamo), and Hassan Ndam (New York Red Bulls). Kei Kamara was then traded to the Colorado Rapids for an international roster spot.

=== Major League Soccer era (2019–present) ===
FC Cincinnati played their first match as a Major League Soccer franchise on March 3, 2019, a 4–1 road loss to Seattle Sounders FC. They played their first MLS home opener on March 17, 2019, a 3–0 win over Portland Timbers before a sellout crowd of 32,350. On May 7, 2019, the club fired head coach Alan Koch after a 2–7–2 start to the 2019 MLS season. Assistant coach Yoann Damet was named as interim head coach. President and general manager Jeff Berding cited a culmination of on-field performance and off-field matters for the dismissal. On August 8, 2019, Ron Jans was officially hired and made head coach of FC Cincinnati. However, Jans resigned on February 17, 2020, amidst an investigation into his alleged use of a racial slur.

On August 6, 2021, FC Cincinnati announced that the club and then general manager Gerard Nijkamp had "parted ways effective immediately". On September 27, 2021, the club relieved the duties of head coach Jaap Stam, 2-time interim head coach Yoann Damet, and assistant coach Said Bakkati. Former MLS defender Tyrone Marshall was named interim coach.

On October 4, 2021, FC Cincinnati announced the hiring of Chris Albright as the general manager of the club. On December 14, 2021, FC Cincinnati officially hired Pat Noonan as the new head coach of the team. Under the first season of the Albright-Noonan regime, the Orange and Blue would qualify for their first post-season in 2022 on 49 points (12–9–13), good for fifth in the East (eighth in the league). Brenner and Brandon Vázquez would score a joint-best 18 goals in the regular season, the first time in MLS history teammates had made such a mark; in addition, Luciano Acosta contributed 10 goals and a league-leading 19 assists to a Cincinnati side that netted 64 goals on the season. Cincinnati defeated New York Red Bulls in their first MLS Cup Playoffs match (2–1) before losing to a resilient Philadelphia Union in the conference semifinals, 1–0.

FC Cincinnati would follow up their 2022 success by producing a season that would prove to be the best in the club's short MLS history. The club's June 21, 2023, win against Toronto FC tied the MLS record for consecutive home wins in a single-season, a record held since 2002 by the San Jose Earthquakes. The club reached the semifinals of the Lamar Hunt U.S. Open Cup for the second time in its history, and first since joining MLS, losing on penalties after a 3–3 home draw in the club's first matchup with Inter Miami. The club was the first in the 2023 season to clinch a playoff berth in the MLS Cup Playoffs, doing so away at Atlanta United FC on August 30. On September 23, a 3–0 victory against Charlotte FC earned the club its first qualification to the 2024 CONCACAF Champions Cup.

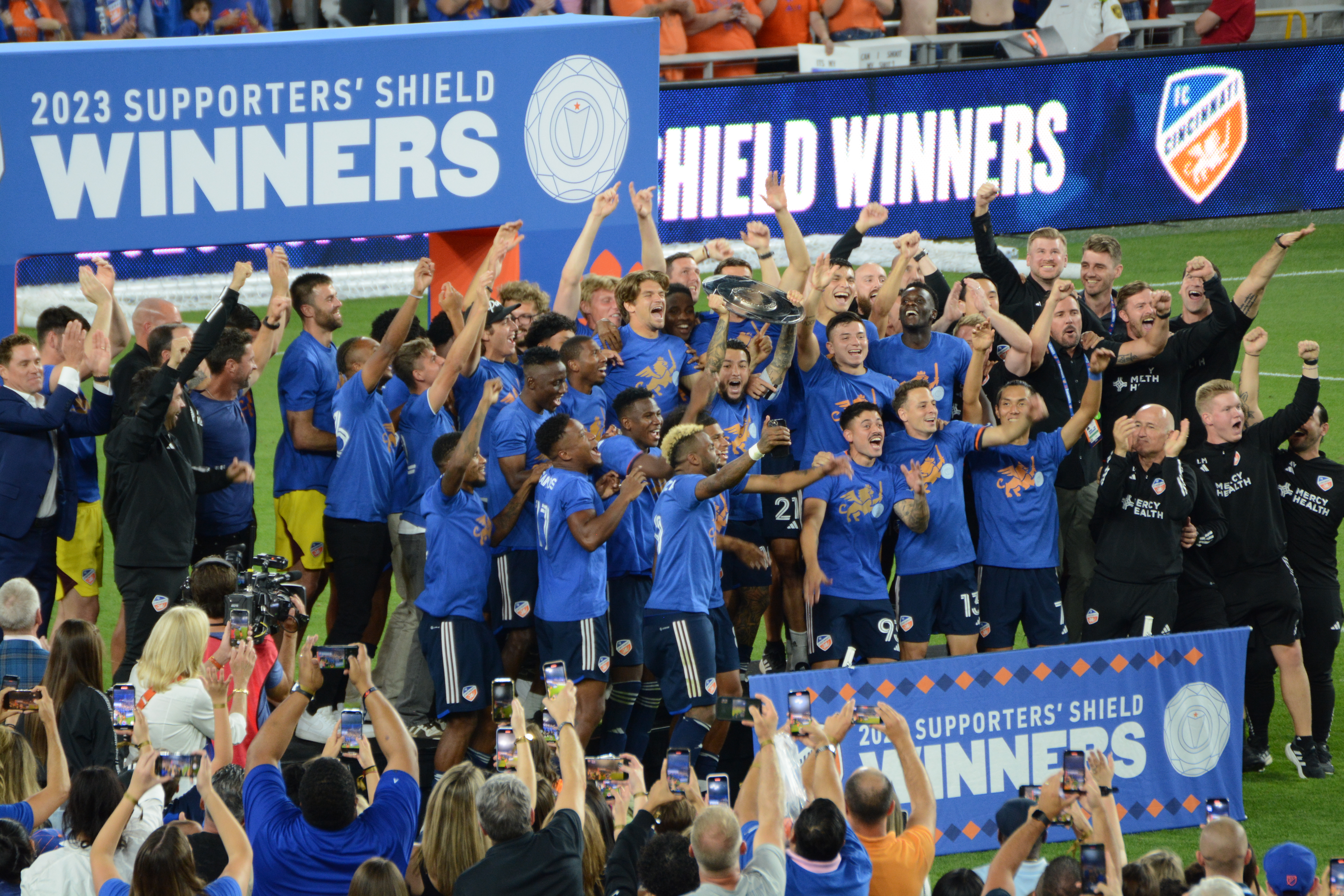
Captain Luciano Acosta holds up the Supporters' Shield after Cincinnati clinched it in 2023.

FC Cincinnati won the MLS Supporters' Shield on September 30, 2023, after beating Toronto FC away 3–2. The trophy awards the regular season's top-finishing club across both conferences. It is the second trophy the club has won in its existence and the first in its MLS era. In the 2023 MLS Cup Playoffs, the club advanced past the New York Red Bulls in a best of 3 series format used for the opening round of playoffs, sweeping the series 2–0. FC Cincinnati then defeated Philadelphia Union 1–0 in dramatic fashion thanks to an extra time game winner by Yerson Mosquera. This clinched the club's first appearance in the Conference Finals of a playoff. On November 27, 2023, Lucho Acosta was named 2023 MLS Most Valuable Player. He became the club's 3rd league MVP and first in the MLS era. On December 2, 2023, FCC would face rivals Columbus Crew at TQL stadium in the MLS Eastern Conference Finals, losing in extra-time by a score of 3–2. This was the first "Hell is Real' matchup to take place in the playoffs.

On February 22, 2024, FC Cincinnati played their first ever match in the CONCACAF Champions Cup, a 2–0 away win at Cavalier FC of Jamaica. The club advanced past Cavalier 6–0 on aggregate before falling to CF Monterrey of Mexico 3–1 on aggregate in the Round of 16. The club would start hot in MLS play, topping the table into late summer until an injury to reigning MVP Lucho Acosta threatened to derail the season. Furthermore, DP striker Aaron Boupendza would have his contract terminated by MLS on August 4. The team regrouped to finish 3rd in the eastern conference. The first round of the MLS Cup playoffs pitted them against New York City FC in a best of 3 series. FCC would defeat NYCFC 1–0 at TQL stadium on October 28, 2024. They would fall on the road a week later by a score of 3-1, setting up a winner take all game 3 at TQL. On November 7, FCC would fall on penalties 6–5 to end their 2024 season. Following the game, Lucho Acosta would express his desire to leave the club in a post-game press conference.

== Stadium ==
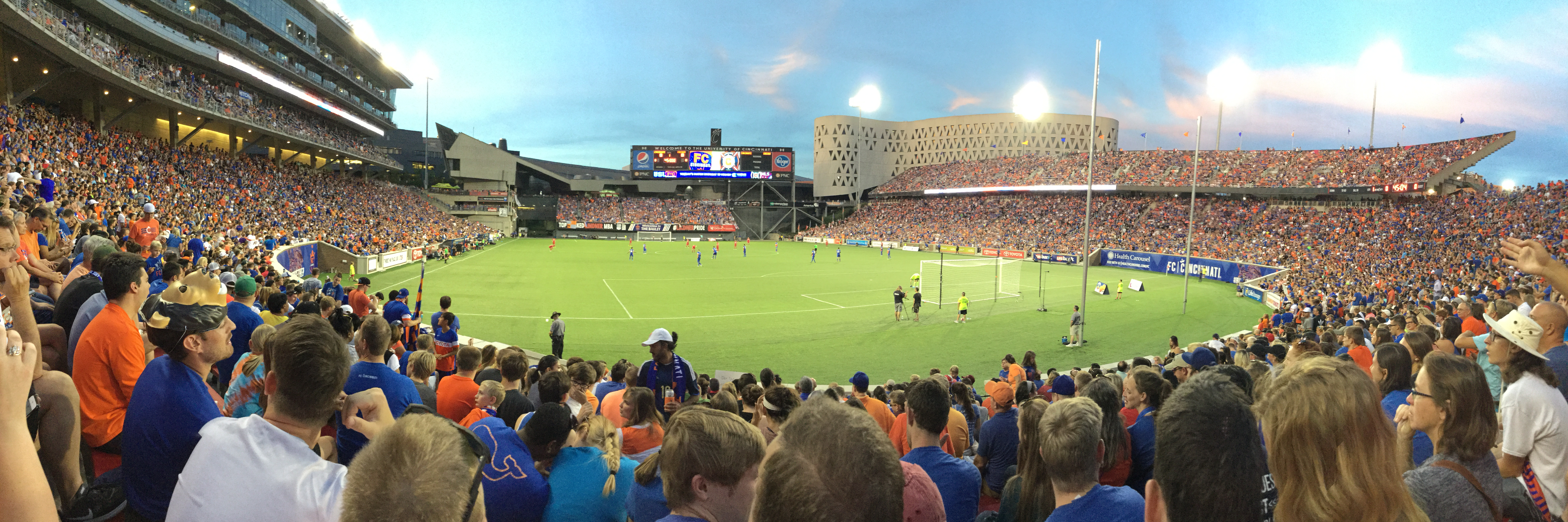
Nippert Stadium during a 2017 FC Cincinnati match

From 2016 through 2020, FC Cincinnati played home matches at Nippert Stadium on the campus of the University of Cincinnati, also home to the school's football team. The stadium was designed for American football and underwent a minor renovation in 2016 to accommodate the soccer team, a few months after the completion of a major renovation by the football team. FC Cincinnati limited stadium capacity for USL matches to approximately 25,000 with upper level sections covered. The stadium design meets all Major League Soccer criteria as well as being able to host FIFA sponsored events. The "Bailey" was the official supporters section in Nippert, with a capacity of 1,700 and regular displays of flags, tifos, and colored smoke. Other sections of the stadium catered towards casual fans and families, including sections with bleachers seating and club seating.

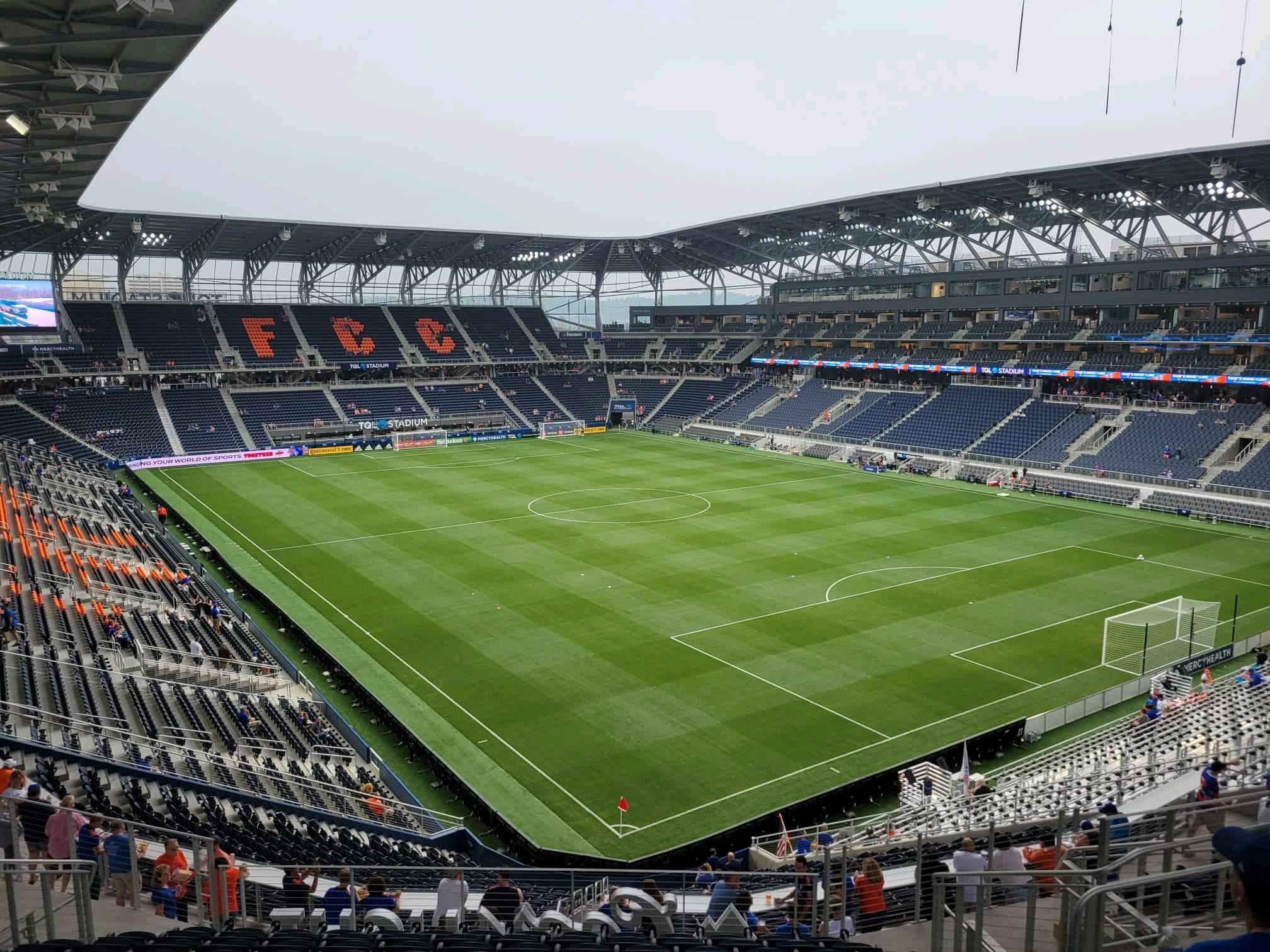
TQL Stadium in 2021

From 2016, FC Cincinnati had publicly discussed plans to build their own soccer-specific stadium. They had a shortlist of three possible stadium sites in 2017, and in 2018, made moves to purchase land in the West End neighborhood. Construction of TQL Stadium began in 2019 and finished in 2021. The new stadium hosted its first match, a 2–3 loss to Inter Miami CF, on May 16, 2021.

=== Training facilities ===
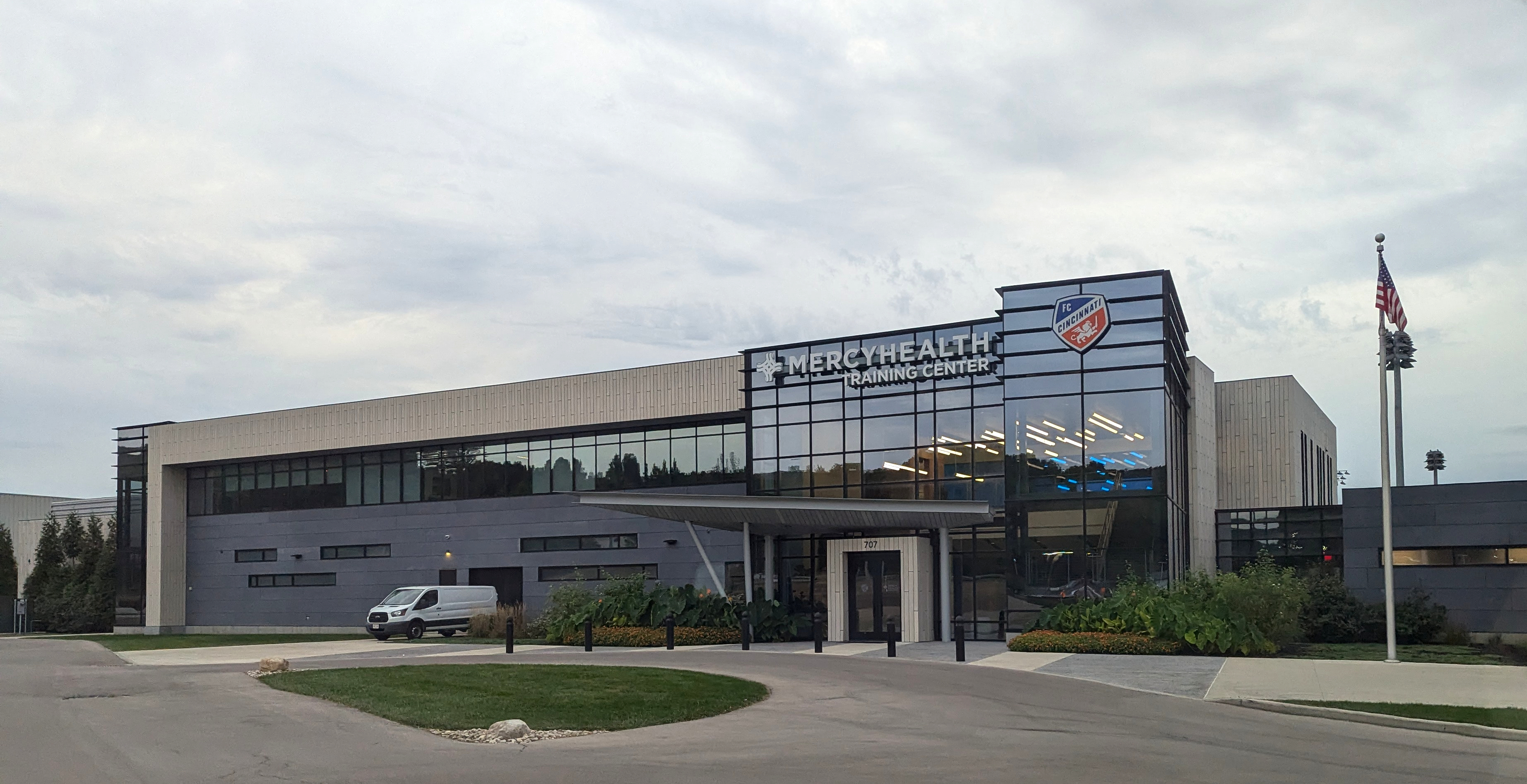
Mercy Health Training Center in Milford, Ohio

Starting in the club's inaugural 2016 season, the team practiced at Nippert Stadium as well as existing practice facilities such as a temporarily-enclosed field at the University of Cincinnati and Wall2Wall, an indoor soccer facility in Mason, Ohio. The club first announced their intention to construct a dedicated training facility in October 2016.

In June 2018, one month after the club's entry into Major League Soccer was announced, the club purchased a 23.6 acres (9.6 ha) site in Milford, Ohio, and shared plans for their new training facility, designed by MSA Sport. A groundbreaking was held on September 19, 2018, and Mercy Health was announced as the name sponsor. Leading into the 2019 season, the team began training at the site in February with a temporary building and one turf pitch, with a grass pitch becoming ready in April.

Construction was completed at a cost of $35 million, and Mercy Health Training Center held its grand opening on November 6, 2019. The complex includes a 30,000 sq ft (2,800 m^{2}) building with facilities for both the first team and the academy, three pitches (two grass, one turf), and a goalkeepers area.

== Colors & crest ==
FC Cincinnati's original logo, used during its United Soccer League years (2015–2018)

FC Cincinnati's primary colors are the orange and blue, which is also used as a nickname for the team. The secondary colors are gray, dark blue, and white.

The original crest, used during the team's USL era, was a simple shield with a crown and the winged lion of Saint Mark the Evangelist holding a sword and a soccer ball. The colors and crests originated with the Dayton Dutch Lions, the team's launch partner.

An updated crest was designed after FC Cincinnati were accepted as an expansion team to Major League Soccer. It maintains the same orange and blue color scheme while updating the winged lion and relative sizing of the text displaying the club's name.

=== Sponsorship ===
Period	Kit manufacturer	Shirt sponsor	Sleeve sponsor
2015–2018	Nike	Toyota	—
2019	Adidas	Mercy Health	—
2020	Adidas	Mercy Health	First Financial Bank
2021–present	Adidas	Mercy Health	Kroger

FC Cincinnati reached a multiyear deal with First Financial Bank to serve as the club's exclusive banking and financial services partner. First Financial will gain many benefits from this partnership. There will be a First Financial Gate as well as a premium club area at the new stadium. They will also be involved in planning community events, fan experiences and game-day activities. As part of an extended sponsorship, First Financial Bank was announced as FC Cincinnati's sleeve sponsor, along with Cintas.

== Supporters & club culture ==
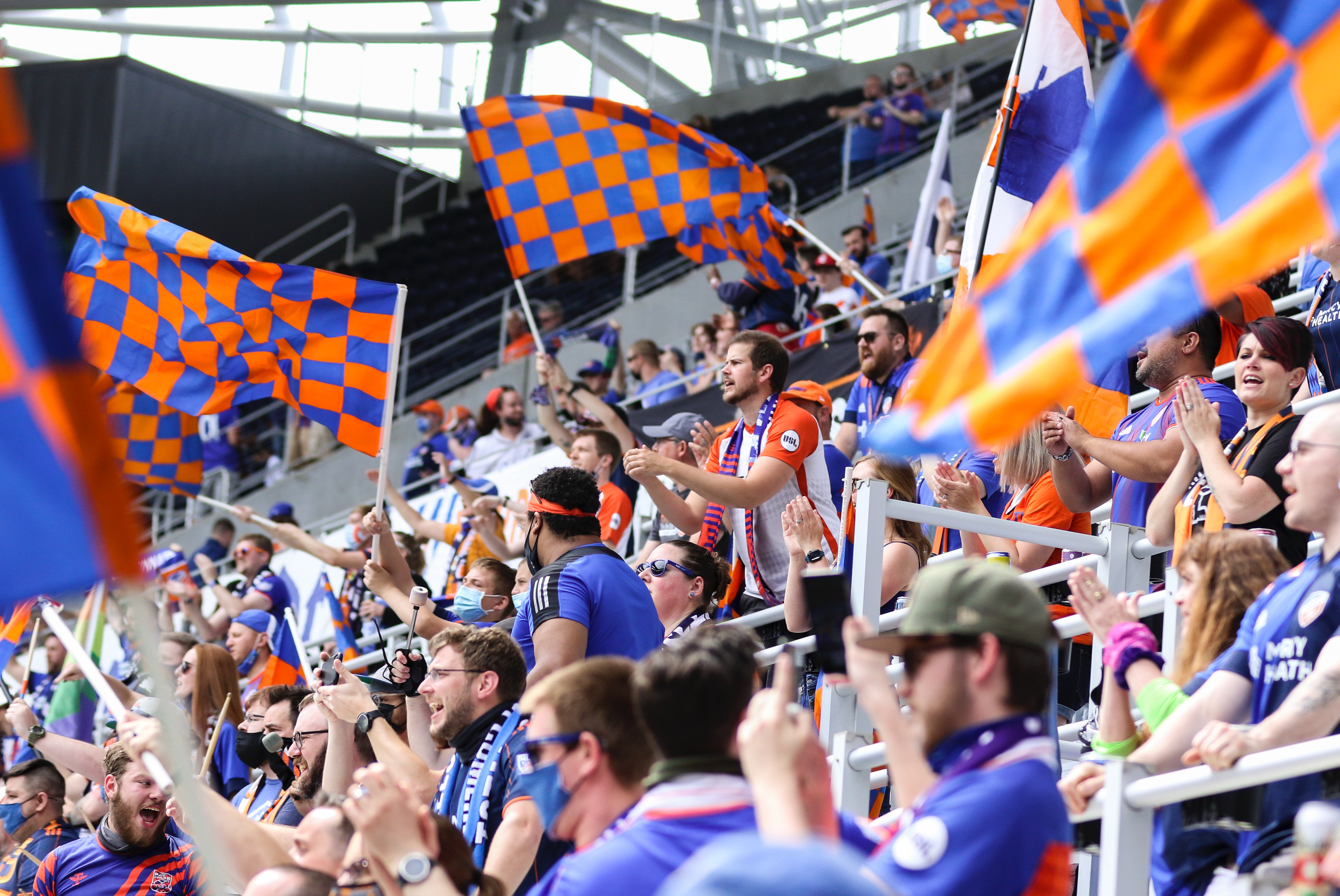
The Bailey is the main supporters section at TQL Stadium.

The club recognizes the following supporters' groups: Auxilia One, the Briogáid (formerly The Bailey Bastards), The 5th Line, Die Innenstadt, Hangar 937, Knights of the Bailey, Norden, The Pride, and Queen City Mafia. Each of these supporter groups is organized under a unified body called 'The Incline Collective', which is responsible for pooling resources for community events, tifos, organizing the pre-match march, and coordinating with the club. The Pride, FCC's oldest supporter's group, has two satellite chapters; The Pride Orange and Bluegrass, based in Lexington, Kentucky, and The Pride 812, based in Southeastern Indiana. Current and former unrecognized supporters' groups include but are not limited to The Bridge, Caballeros, Queen City Firm, Naked Knights, and The Vanguard. As of 2023, known international fan groups include Kumasinnati in Kumasi, Ghana, FC Cincy UK Supporters, and FC Cincinnati France.

=== The march ===
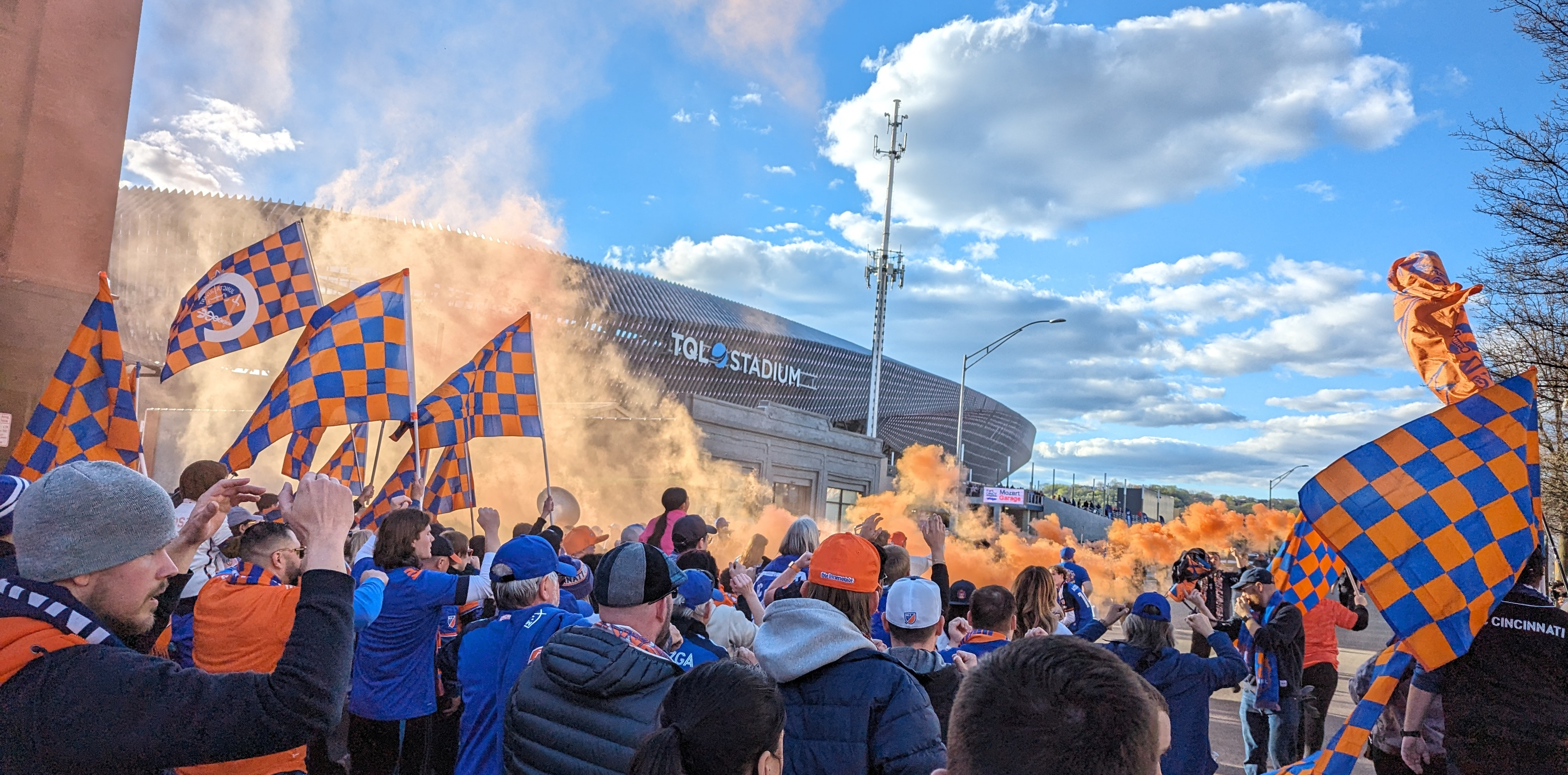
Fans marching to TQL Stadium before a 2024 match

The march began with the club's debut in the USL and is one of the longest-running traditions of FC Cincinnati supporters. In its earliest iterations, this pre-match celebration involved fans participating in an organized march to Nippert Stadium, joining gradually from base points in Over-the-Rhine (OTR) and Clifton, usually "home" pubs for various supporters' groups and fans.

Since the club's move to TQL Stadium in 2021, the march weaves through various points of interest in OTR and West End neighborhoods including Findlay Market and several breweries and pubs, including Northern Row, OTR Stillhouse, Holiday Spirits, The Symphony Hotel, and The Pitch. The group makes a stop at Washington Park – the principal location of the club's pre-match fan festivities – to link up with more fans for a rally. When the march re-commences, supporters pass Cincinnati Music Hall and enter the final leg to TQL Stadium.

=== Supporter-driven media ===
There are several current and former supporter-driven media outlets offering coverage of the club, including Cincinnati Soccer Talk, The Post Cincy, Knifey Lion Radio, and Nación FCC.

=== Mascot ===
Introduced in 2019 prior to the club's inaugural MLS season, FC Cincinnati's mascot is an embodiment of the winged lion featured on the current and USL-era crests. Known as "Gary the Knifey Lion," the blue-haired, orange-furred feline mascot costume features a crown and pair of wings. Fans provided the "Gary" moniker after noticing that the lion's tail, torso, and left arm can be loosely construed as spelling "Gary" on the team crest when read left-to-right.

=== Nicknames ===
The club's most common nicknames are "The Orange and Blue" and "The Garys."

Some supporters colloquially refer to the club as "The FC" or simply "FC." This habit emerged when the club played in USL and donned its first crest, which visually emphasized the large letters "FC" over the more diminutive "Cincinnati." Emphasis on the name of the city, rather than "FC," was prioritized in the MLS rebrand, but some fans continue to endearingly, and often humorously, refer to the club as "FC" or "The FC."

== Rivalries ==
=== Columbus Crew ===
Cincinnati has an in-state rival in Columbus Crew. The idea of the Ohio soccer rivalry first gained popularity ahead of a 2017 U.S. Open Cup match between FC Cincinnati (then in the United Soccer League) and the Crew. The rivalry was dubbed the "Hell Is Real Derby," after a billboard on Interstate 71, the highway between Columbus and Cincinnati. The clubs faced each other in their first league matches in 2019: on August 10 in Columbus and August 25 in Cincinnati (the latter match took place during MLS Rivalry Week).

=== Louisville City FC ===
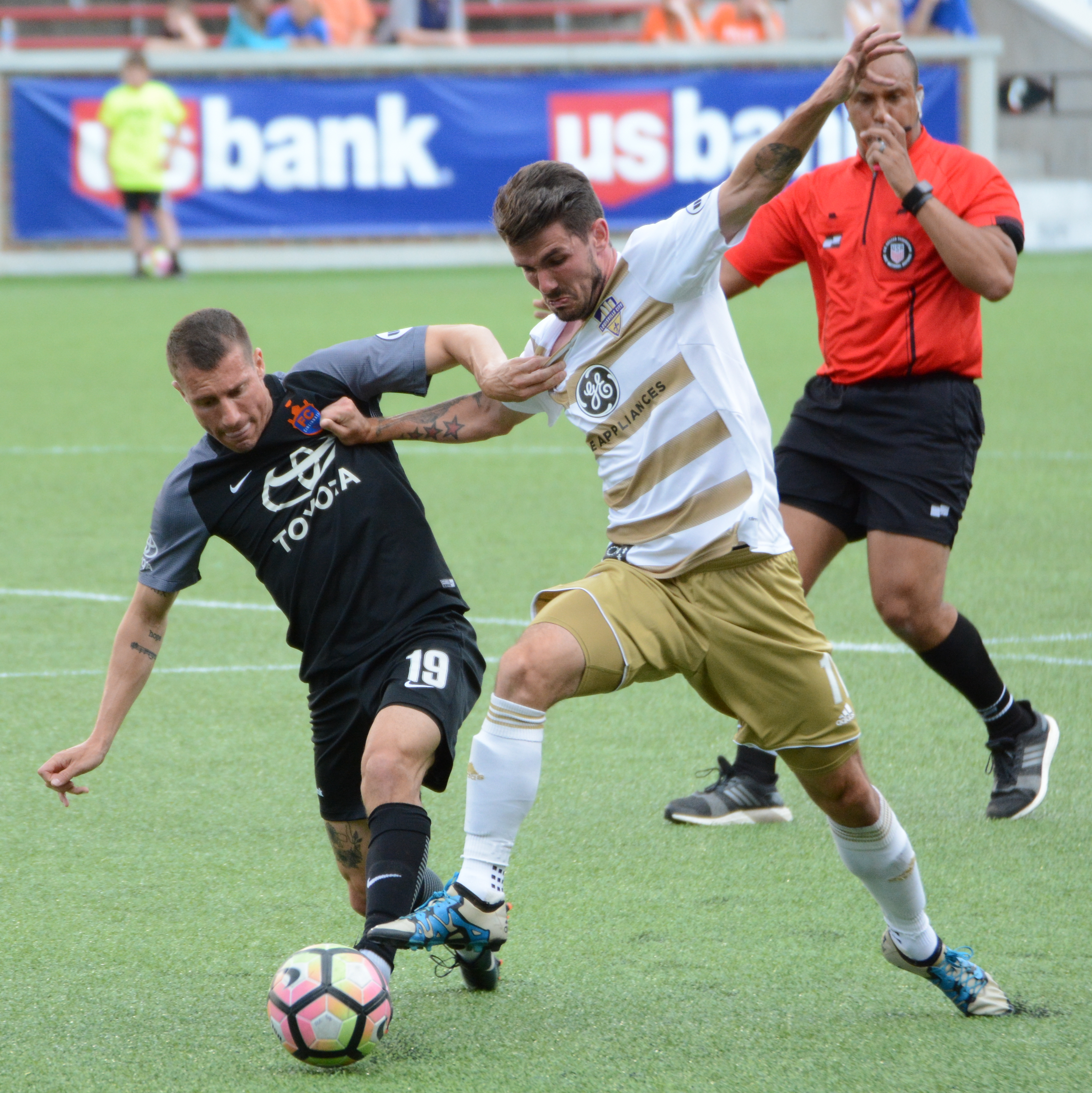
Corben Bone of Cincinnati and Niall McCabe of Louisville fight for the ball in the 2017 U.S. Open Cup.

During FC Cincinnati's USL tenure, its main league and regional rival was Louisville City FC, located a mere 100 miles southwest of Cincinnati along the Ohio River. The two clubs competed annually for the River Cities Cup in what was known to locals as "The Dirty River Derby." The rivalry became one of the best-attended and most hotly-contested matchups in lower division US soccer.

The cities' two main universities (Louisville and Cincinnati) had a long-standing football rivalry and basketball rivalry that ended in 2013 due to conference realignment. Both teams went 1–1–1 against each other in each of the first two seasons of the rivalry (2016 and 2017), with Cincinnati taking the cup home in 2016 and Louisville City doing so in 2017, both on aggregate. Louisville City retained the trophy in 2018 by winning the first two of the teams' three regular-season matches. The two teams most recently met in the Third Round of the 2023 U.S. Open Cup at TQL Stadium with FC Cincinnati winning 1–0.

=== Pittsburgh Riverhounds ===
During the team's USL era, FC Cincinnati formed a potential rivalry with the Pittsburgh Riverhounds. The contention developed from the rivalry between the NFL's Cincinnati Bengals and Pittsburgh Steelers. The first-ever meeting between the two clubs, which took place on May 14, 2016, at Nippert Stadium, set a then-USL attendance record of 23,375. The match was billed as an "Orange Out" and featured Bengals players on the pitch before the match as honorary captains.

== Ownership ==
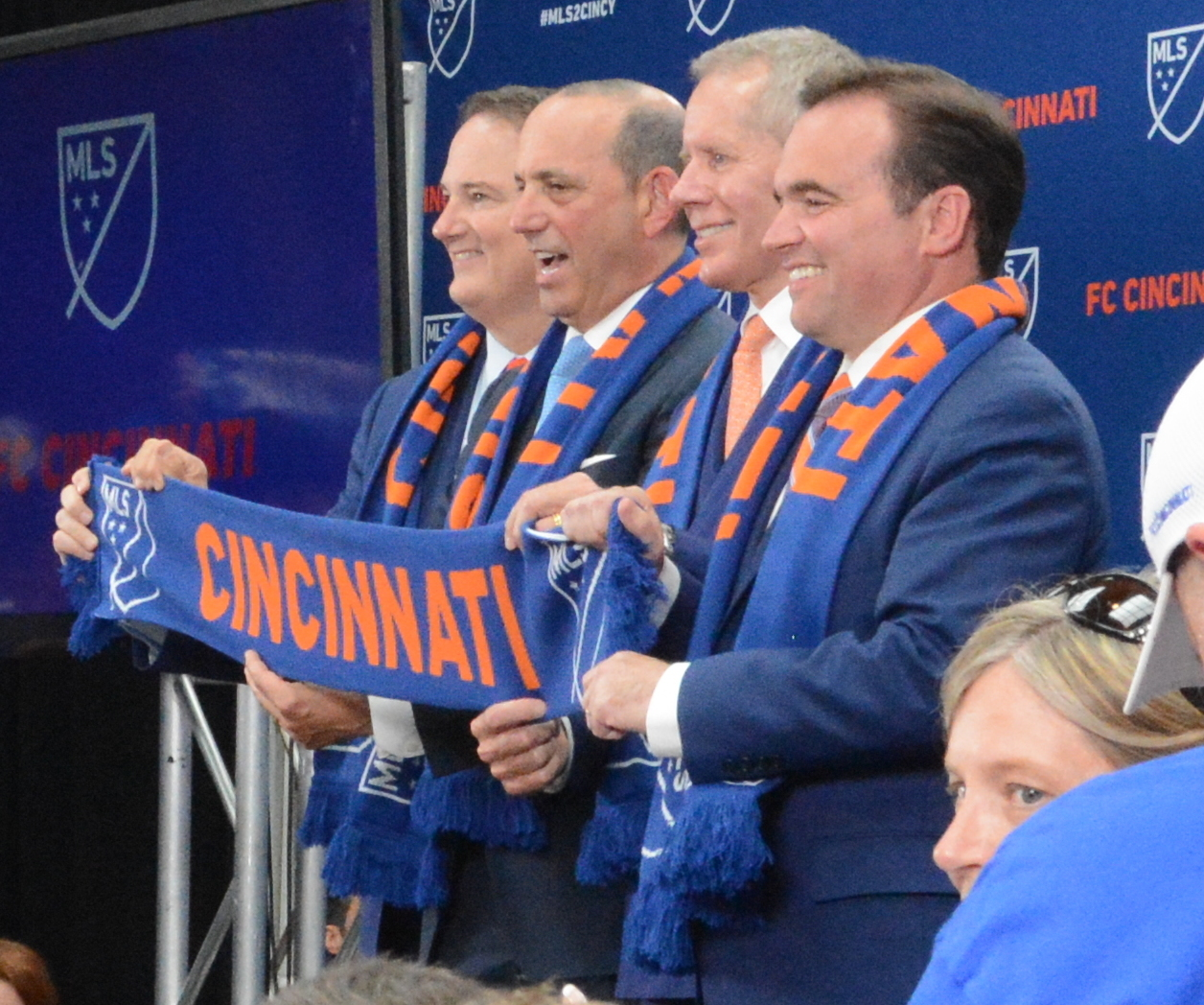
Club co-CEO Jeff Berding, MLS commissioner Don Garber, club owner and CEO Carl Lindner III, and former Cincinnati mayor John Cranley

Former Cincinnati Bengals executive Jeff Berding was the club's original president and general manager, and in 2022, he was promoted to co-CEO. The CEO and majority owner of the team is Carl Lindner III, CEO of American Financial Group, with Scott Farmer also a leading owner. The club's original ownership group in their USL era also included Chris Lindner (Carl III's son), David L. Thompson, Jeff Berding, Scott Farmer, Steve Hightower, George Joseph, Mike Mossel (who is an owner of the Dayton Dutch Lions), and Jack Wyant.

In November 2019, Meg Whitman purchased a minority stake in the club. Whitman will serve as the club's Alternate Governor on the MLS Board of Governors.

== Media ==
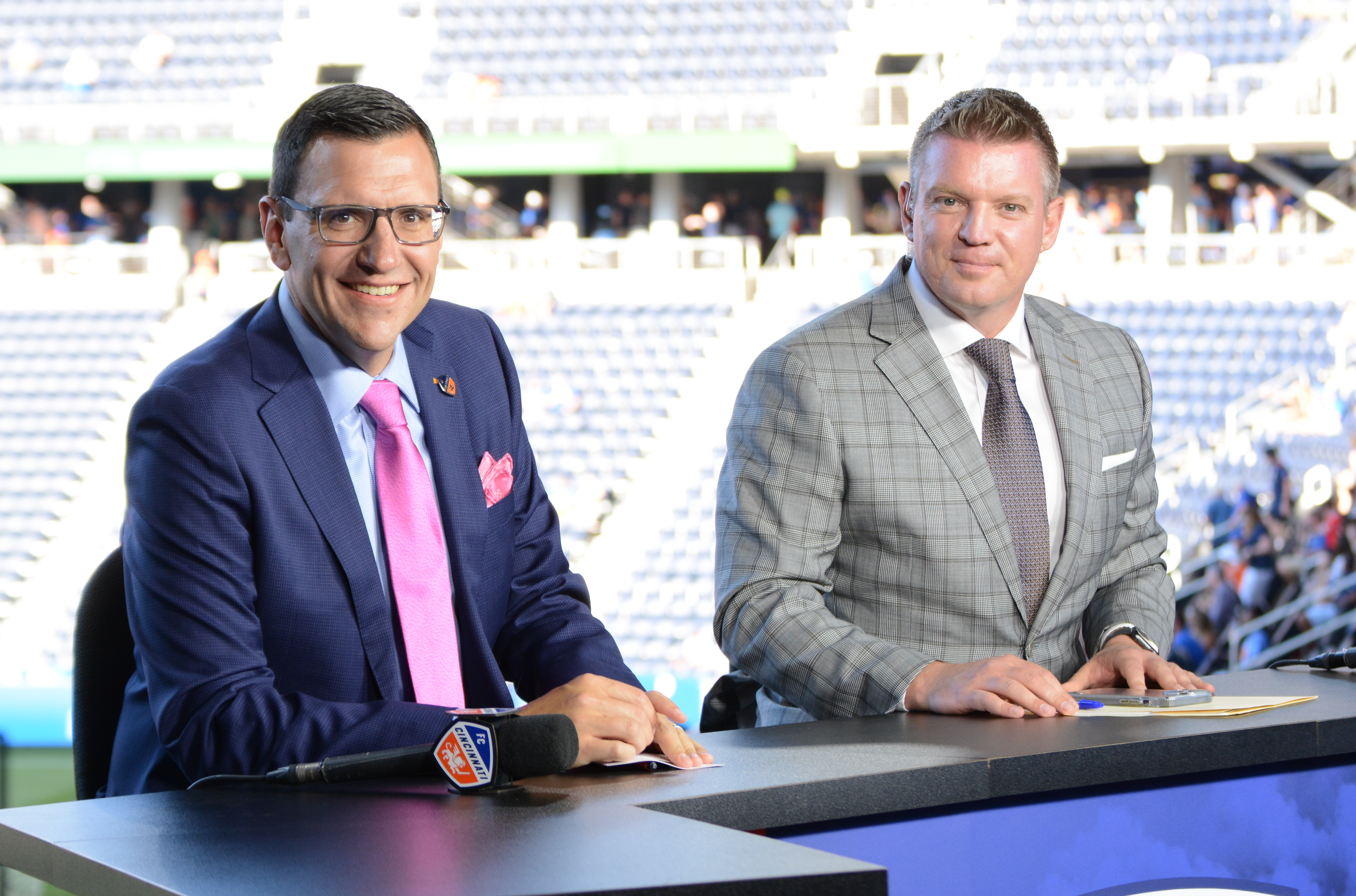
Tom Gelehrter and Kevin McCloskey provide commentary on the club's television and radio broadcasts.

On February 23, 2016, FC Cincinnati announced ESPN 1530 as the official radio partner for the organization. Since 2016, ESPN 1530 has aired all of FCC's regular season home matches.

On March 22, 2017, FC Cincinnati reached an agreement with Sinclair Broadcast Group to have WKRC-TV, WSTR-TV and CinCW 12.2 televise all home and away games, including playoff games. Nine games aired on WSTR, four on CinCW, and two on Local 12. Tom Gelehrter called play-by-play with Kevin McCloskey and Paul Rockwood as color analysts. Lindsay Patterson served as sideline reporter.

For the club's first two seasons, all live USL matches were live-streamed on YouTube. A few weeks into their third season, however, the USL reached an agreement with ESPN to make ESPN+ its official live-streaming service starting on April 12, 2018. USL matches remained accessible outside of the United States on YouTube.

FC Cincinnati broadcast its 2016 friendly against Crystal Palace live on Facebook. The broadcast also featured special Facebook Live 360-degree footage.

On January 30, 2019, FC Cincinnati reached an agreement with Sinclair Broadcast Group to have WSTR-TV televise all home and away games, except for ones already scheduled to be broadcast nationally. Continuing from their roles on the former USL team, Tom Gelehrter would call play-by-play with Kevin McCloskey as color analyst. Lindsay Patterson served as sideline reporter through 2019, and Alex Stec held the position from 2020.

From 2023, all FC Cincinnati matches are available on MLS Season Pass from Apple TV, ending FC Cincinnati's time on local TV. Gelehrter and McCloskey maintained their commentary roles on local radio broadcasts, which are also available through Apple TV during home games.

Gelehrter's Cincinnati-based media company 4th Floor Creative has produced extensive brand and documentary work for the club.

== Players and staff ==
=== Roster ===
As of October 9, 2026

Note: Flags indicate national team as defined under FIFA eligibility rules; some limited exceptions apply. Players may hold more than one non-FIFA nationality.

No.	Pos.	Nation	Player
2	DF	JAM	Alvas Powell
3	DF	NED	Tyrell Malacia
4	DF	USA	Nick Hagglund
5	MF	NGR	Obinna Nwobodo
6	DF	ARG	Julián Malatini (on loan from Werder Bremen)
9	FW	TOG	Kévin Denkey
10	MF	BRA	Evander
11	MF	SVK	Samuel Gidi
12	DF	USA	Miles Robinson
13	GK	USA	Evan Louro
14	FW	USA	Kristian Fletcher
15	DF	ZIM	Teenage Hadebe
16	FW	USA	Tom Barlow
17	FW	FRA	Kenji Mboma Dem
18	GK	USA	Roman Celentano

No.	Pos.	Nation	Player
19	FW	ROU	Ștefan Chirilă
20	MF	CZE	Pavel Bucha
22	MF	USA	Gerardo Valenzuela
23	MF	CZE	David Douděra
24	DF	USA	Kyle Smith
27	MF	CMR	Brian Anunga
29	FW	ECU	Bryan Ramírez
30	MF	MEX	Ademar Chávez
55	DF	LBA	Ayoub Lajhar
66	FW	VEN	Ender Echenique
70	MF	VEN	José Martínez
88	DF	USA	Andrei Chirilă
89	GK	USA	Connor Dale
93	GK	POL	Fabian Mrozek (on loan from Liverpool)
99	FW	MAR	Ayoub Jabbari

=== Out on loan ===
Note: Flags indicate national team as defined under FIFA eligibility rules; some limited exceptions apply. Players may hold more than one non-FIFA nationality.

No.	Pos.	Nation	Player
25	GK	USA	Paul Walters (on loan to Bohemians)
37	MF	USA	Stiven Jimenez (on loan to Fluminense)

No.	Pos.	Nation	Player
38	DF	USA	Brian Schaefer (on loan to Tampa Bay Rowdies)
—	DF	PAR	Gilberto Flores (on loan to Libertad)

=== Technical staff ===
Title	Name
General manager	Chris Albright
VP of soccer strategy	Kyle McCarthy
Technical director	Hunter Freeman
Head coach	Pat Noonan
Assistant coach	Kenny Arena
Set Piece Specialist	Aidan Reynolds
Assistant coach	Ricardo Páez
Director of goalkeeping	Paul Rogers
Director of player development	Vacant
Director of athletic training services	Aaron Powell
Head athletic trainer	Patrick Tanner
Strength & conditioning coach	Austin Berry
Head of sports science & nutrition	Phil Keehne

Last updated: August 22, 2026
Source: FC Cincinnati

=== Head coaches ===
Coach	Tenure
(United States) John Harkes	August 12, 2015 – February 17, 2017
(South Africa) Alan Koch	February 17, 2017 – May 7, 2019
(France) Yoann Damet (interim)	May 7, 2019 – August 4, 2019
(Netherlands) Ron Jans	August 4, 2019 – February 17, 2020
(France) Yoann Damet (interim)	February 17, 2020 – May 21, 2020
(Netherlands) Jaap Stam	May 21, 2020 – September 27, 2021
(Jamaica) Tyrone Marshall (interim)	September 27, 2021 – November 7, 2021
(United States) Pat Noonan	December 14, 2021 – present

=== Club captains ===
Captain	Years
(United States) Austin Berry	2016–2017
(Israel) Dekel Keinan	2018
(Costa Rica) Kendall Waston	2019–2020
(Argentina) Luciano Acosta	2021–2024
(United States) Matt Miazga	2025
(United States) Miles Robinson	2026
(Brazil) Evander	2026

== Records ==
=== Year-by-year ===
This is a partial list of the last five seasons completed by FC Cincinnati. For the full season-by-season history, see: List of FC Cincinnati seasons.

Season	League										Position		Playoffs	USOC	Leagues Cup	Continental	Avg. att.	Top goalscorer	
Season	League	Pld	W	L	D	GF	GA	GD	Pts	PPG	Conf.	Overall	Playoffs	USOC	Leagues Cup	Continental	Avg. att.	Name(s)	G
2021	MLS	34	4	22	8	37	74	−37	20	0.59	14th	27th	DNQ	NH	N/A	DNQ	21,175	Brenner	8
2022	MLS	34	12	9	13	64	56	8	49	1.44	5th	10th	QF	R32	Showcase	DNQ	22,503	Brandon Vázquez	20
2023	MLS	34	20	5	9	57	39	18	69	2.03	1st	1st	SF	SF	R32	DNQ	25,367	Luciano Acosta	21
2024	MLS	34	18	11	5	58	48	10	59	1.74	3rd	5th	R1	DNE	R16	R16	25,237	Luciano Acosta	15
2025	MLS	34	20	9	5	52	40	12	65	1.91	2nd	2nd	QF	DNE	League phase	R16	24,668	Evander	22

1. Avg. attendance include statistics from league matches only.
2. Top goalscorer(s) includes all goals scored in League, Playoffs, U.S. Open Cup, Leagues Cup, and CONCACAF Champions Cup.

== Player records ==
=== Appearances ===
As of match played November 22, 2026

Rank	Player	Period	League	Playoffs	U.S. Open Cup	Leagues Cup	CONCACAF Champions Cup	Total
1	(United States) **Nick Hagglund**	2019–present	165	6	8	4	1	184
2	(Japan) Yūya Kubo	2020–2025	146	12 (Note: Includes one appearance in MLS is Back Tournament knockout stage)	6	8 (Note: Includes one appearance in 2022 Leagues Cup Showcase)	7	179
2	(United States) **Roman Celentano**	2022–present	149	15	1	4	10	179
4	(Nigeria) **Obinna Nwobodo**	2022–present	126	14	4	11	10	165
5	(Jamaica) **Alvas Powell**	2019; 2022–present	127	12	7	7	10	163
6	(Argentina) Luciano Acosta	2021–2024	125	9	7	6	4	151
7	(United States) Brandon Vázquez	2020–2023	112	6	5	4	0	127
7	(Czech Republic) **Pavel Bucha**	2024–present	98	9	0	10	10	127
9	(Argentina) Álvaro Barreal	2020–2025	104	6	7	4	0	121
10	(United States) Corben Bone	2016–2019	96	4	10	0	0	110

=== Goals ===
As of match played November 19, 2026

Rank	Player	Period	League	Playoffs	U.S. Open Cup	Leagues Cup	CONCACAF Champions Cup	Total
1	(Argentina) Luciano Acosta	2021–2024	48	3	1	1	1	54
2	(United States) Brandon Vázquez	2020–2023	32	2	3	6 (Note: Includes one goal in 2022 Leagues Cup Showcase)	0	43
3	**(Brazil) Evander**	2025–present	32	2	0	4	2	40
4	(Togo) **Kévin Denkey**	2025–present	32	1	0	0	6	39
5	(Brazil) Brenner	2021–2023; 2025	31	2	0	0	0	33
6	(Denmark) Danni König	2017–2018	22	0	0	0	0	22
6	(Argentina) Emmanuel Ledesma	2018–2019	22	0	0	0	0	22
8	(Czech Republic) **Pavel Bucha**	2024–present	13	0	0	5	3	21
9	(Argentina) Álvaro Barreal	2020–2025	13	2	4	0	0	19
9	(Japan) Yūya Kubo	2020–2025	15	0	2	2	0	19

=== Clean sheets ===
As of match played November 22, 2026

Rank	Player	Period	League	Playoffs	U.S. Open Cup	Leagues Cup	CONCACAF Champions Cup	Total
1	(United States) **Roman Celentano**	2022–present	38	6	1	1	4	50
2	(United States) Mitch Hildebrandt	2016–2017	18	0	4	0	0	22
3	(United States) Spencer Richey	2018–2021	10	0	1	0	0	11
3	(Poland) Przemysław Tytoń	2019–2021	11	0	0	0	0	11
5	(United States) Evan Newton	2018	9	0	0	0	0	9
6	(Netherlands) Kenneth Vermeer	2021–2022	4	0	0	0	0	4
7	(United States) Alec Kann	2022–2025	1	0	2	0	0	3
7	**(United States) Evan Louro**	2022–present	1	0	0	1	1	3
9	(Guam) Dallas Jaye	2016–2017	1	0	1	0	0	2

Bolded players are currently on the FC Cincinnati roster.

== Honors ==
=== Major League Soccer ===
- Supporters' Shield
  - Winners (1): 2023
  - Runners-up (1): 2025

=== United Soccer League (Note: Known since 2019 as the USL Championship) ===
- Regular Season Championship (Note: Known since 2023 as the Players' Shield)
  - Winners (1): 2018

== Affiliated clubs ==
On September 25, 2020, FC Cincinnati signed a partnership agreement with Bundesliga club TSG 1899 Hoffenheim. The club is also a part of the "Common Values Club Alliance" with Hoffenheim and Ghanaian Premier League club Hearts of Oak SC.

On January 28, 2026, the club announced a strategic partnership agreement with Primeira Liga side FC Porto.

The club owns and operates FC Cincinnati 2, a reserve team that plays in MLS Next Pro.
