= Iofina =

US based chemical company

Iofina plc
- Type: Public Symbol: IOF
- Industry: Chemicals
- Founded: 2005
- Headquarters: Greenwood Village, Colorado, USA
- Key people: Lance J Baller (Chairman); Dr. Thomas Becker (CEO); Malcolm Lewin (CFO)
- Products: Specialty halogen based chemicals and pure iodine producer
- Revenue: US$50.0 million (2023)
- Operating income: $8.60 million
- Net income: $6.56 million (2023)
- Number of employees: c. 115 (2023)
- Website: www.iofina.com

Iofina plc is a US based vertically integrated company that specializes in the exploration and production of iodine and the manufacturing of specialty chemical derivatives. It markets around the globe via its business lines, Iofina Resources and Iofina Chemical.

Iofina Resources ("IR") is the group's iodine production business, which isolates iodine using its proprietary WET IOsorb technologies. It isolates iodine recovered from brine produced from oil and gas operations that would otherwise be wasted. It is the second-largest producer of iodine in North America, which currently imports the vast majority of its iodine. Iodine has numerous applications in human health, biocides, the manufacture of acetic, and many other areas. IR's iodine is either sold directly to global customers or converted to iodine-based compounds at its sister company, Iofina Chemical.

Iofina Chemical ("IC") is the group's halogen-based specialty chemical producer. IC has invested heavily in researching and developing new iodo-, chloro-, and fluoro-based specialty compounds and provides the global market with quality iodine products.

== History ==
Iofina was incorporated on 15 March 2005 in the UK and registered in England and Wales. It was co-founded by Lance Baller and Jeff Ploen. In January 2006 the Group acquired the entire issued share capital of Iofina Inc. their US based Company and its wholly owned subsidiary Iofina Natural Gas Inc., each of which is a Colorado corporation, with the objective of becoming a low cost producer of iodine and natural gas. The group successfully completed its IPO and was admitted for trading on 9 May 2008 on the London Stock Exchange AIM market by Mirabaud Securities. Iofina's IPO was awarded the "AIM: Float of the year in 2008" by Investor's Chronicle. In 2009 the Group's wholly owned subsidiary Iofina Chemical, Inc acquired Kentucky based H&S Chemical, a small specialty chemical producer doing under $10 million USD in revenue, purchased for $8.5 million USD. Under Mr. Baller's tenure convertible debt of $20 million with a 6% coupon was placed for Iofina at above market pricing along with three secondary offerings totaling over $55 million, all at above market pricing from institutional investors. Blackrock, JP Morgan, Stena Investments, UBS and Legal and General were the largest institutional shareholders in every round.

In 2012 Iofina Natural Gas was rebranded to Iofina Resources. Mr. Baller was able to turn Iofina from a start up in late 2005 into a profitable company with a market capitalization of around a half a billion dollars while having to create new technology and reinvent Iofina's business plan. The Group was EBITDA positive and had a good amount of cash on the balance sheet from the launch of the Group's high producing IO#2 IOsorb plant. Mr. Baller was able to put in place an untapped Convertible Bond placing of $15 million with shareholder Stena Investments with the conversion price set at a price of US$3.21 (GBP 2.06 converted into US dollars at the GBP:USD exchange rate) (the "Conversion Price") representing a 10 per cent. premium to the shares closing price that day. If not converted or previously redeemed the Bond would be redeemed at par upon their maturity 2 years from the Closing Date. The Bond was extended until 2020.

Mr. Baller had to resign for health reasons and left the Company in 2013. The Board did a search and added George Lantz as CEO and Gary Gatchell as CFO who both had been executives at NASDAQ listed Company's and worked together for Voyant Technologies. With the new management team in place the Group decided to build four IOsorb plants that year and expand aggressively. The group quickly went through its cash and convertible bond money. The management team had delays, poor site planning, difficult work environment and large cost overruns which caused every institutional shareholder to exit the shares. The Group was not able to sell the iodine that it was producing. In 2014 the Groups Chairman Dr. Chris Fay, a former chairman and CEO of Shell UK stepped down. Mr. Baller was reappointed to the Board of Iofina as non-executive Chairman and Dr. William D. Bellamy was added to the board of directors. Dr. Bellamy was the Senior Vice President of the Water Business Group CH2M Hill, Inc, a company he had worked for over 30 years. It was very obvious to Mr. Baller the company was going in the wrong direction as the share price was near a 52-week low, little working capital and large inventory. Mr. Baller asked for and accepted the resignations of Mr. Lantz and Mr. Gatchell. Mr. Baller ran the company as chairman and immediately had to do a $5 million unsecured Convertible Bond for working capital purposes. The Bond was issued at par and had an annual coupon of 6% payable quarterly in arrears. The Bond was convertible into fully paid ordinary shares of the Company at a conversion price equivalent to 40 pence per Ordinary Share, which was a 5.6% premium to the closing price of 37.75p that day. The company had the right to elect conversion of the Bond if the share price traded at 80 pence per Ordinary Share (being a one hundred per cent. premium above the conversion price) for five consecutive trading days. The Company immediately came out with monthly production updates and the two recently appointed directors and the company's senior management reduced their compensation to £1 until further notice. Those reductions implemented, afforded the company a reduction of circa $650,000 per annum without negatively affecting field operations, as the Company focused on bottom line performance.

After stabilising the company for five months, the Group announced its new CEO appointment of Dr. Thomas Becker. Dr. Becker was the current President & CEO of Iofina Chemical, Inc. Under his four years of management, Iofina Chemical had experienced record expansion, revenues and profits. Dr. Becker holds a PhD from the University of Cincinnati and a BS from Indiana University, both in Chemistry. Lance J Baller, co-founder and chairman commented at the time: "Tom has shown he is the ideal candidate to lead Iofina through its next stage of development. His proven success at Iofina Chemical and extensive knowledge and connections within the global iodine industry are well recognised. Tom's leadership will guide Iofina forward as we continue to grow and optimize our company-wide operations." The Group reduced its losses, shut down ill located plants and reduced inventory. The Group went from being a low cost producer, then to a high cost producer and now was slowly working back to a low cost producer.

Iofina became a founding member of the World Iodine Association ("WIA") on 14 October 2015. The mission of the WIA is to support and represent iodine producers, processors, formulators, distributors and end users in relevant industry and official government bodies around the world, with respect to guidelines and regulations on iodine and its derivatives. Alongside Iofina, other founding members of the WIA includes Ajay Europe, Calibre Chemicals, GE Healthcare, Hypred SAS and SQM Europe. The WIA develops, supports and promotes the use of iodine and its derivatives in existing and novel uses and applications in the domains of human and animal health and industry. The WIA provides information about the purposes, uses and applications of iodine and its derivatives to interested parties and aims to help eradicate global iodine deficiency. Dr. Becker serves on the board of directors of WIA.

The company had record production and revenue for nearly eight straight years. The Company in early 2016 once again became the low cost producer. Many of the higher cost iodine producers went out of business in 2016. The Group had accumulated over $25 million in debt from 2014 and has since brought it down to under $10 million since the Group had returned to being EBITDA positive and record net profits. In 2020, against the COVID-19 pandemic, the Group was able to refinance its debt with First Financial Bank and pay off the other creditors including Stena Investments.

With the company's debt sorted and coupled with the increasing profits, the Chairman began to purchase shares in the open market in 2021 and 2022 along with former fund manager Richard Sneller. Mr. Sneller had been Head of Emerging Market Equities with Baillie Gifford since 1994, and had managed the Emerging Markets mutual fund since 2003. Mr. Sneller was a Citywire AAA-rated fund manager at his retirement from the $3.2 billion Baillie Gifford Emerging Markets fund after 25 years. Mr. Sneller joined another well known and successful small cap investor, Mr. David Newlands, who had invested in Iofina since the time of its admission to AIM and continued to build his position over the years. Mr. Sneller and Mr. Newlands continued to acquire large open market purchases of shares in late 2021 and thru 2022. Mr. Sneller became the Group's largest shareholder with a 18.2% stake in the Company in May 2022. Mr. Newlands owned a 7.15% stake in the company.

The Company posted full year 2021 results with financial highlights including increased revenue by 31% from $29.7m (2020) to $39.0m and EBITDA improvement by 47% from $4.7m (2020) to $6.9m. Additional highlights include a bank debt to EBITDA ratio of 1.18 for year-end 2021 compared to 2.62 for year-end 2020, decreased finance expense by 83% from $1.7m (2020) to $0.3m, increased profit before tax by 301% from $1.3m (2020) to $5.1m, increased shareholder equity from $20.7m (2020) to $29.9m, cash flow generation of $5.9m which reduced net debt from $8.9m (2020) to $3.0m, diluted Earnings per share increased by 542% to $.048 (2020:$.0007), after tax profit increased 619% to $9.2m to (2020:$1.3m). The Company planned to start building another new plant called IO#9 in mid 2022 and along with another plant called IO#10 late 2022. The Company grossly missed those targets, and it was announced in October 2022 that construction would begin on only an IO#9 plant in western Oklahoma that would produce 100 to 150 metric Tonnes of iodine per annum. The plant was announced to commence production six months later in April 2023. The Company in January would announce another delay in the opening until later in the second quarter 2023. In November 2022 Canaccord Genuity initiated coverage with a BUY rating and share price target of 35p which was nearly double the current trading price. In February 2023, the company announced that the company would exceed the EBITDA analysts censes numbers in the market by no less than 31 percent for the full year. The censes target price was moved to 37.5p with the possibility of further upside. The Company then said it plans to start construction of IO#10 at the time of startup of IO#9 later in the second quarter.

The Company posted full year 2022 in April 2023. The company had its fifth successive year of record revenue and EDBITDA. The results financial highlights included increased revenue by 8.3% from $39.0m (2021) to $42.2m and EBITDA improvement by 65% from $6.9m (2021) to $11.5m. Additional highlights include a bank debt to EBITDA ratio of .59 for year-end 2022 compared to 1.18 for year-end 2021, increased profit before tax by 96% from $5.1m (2021) to $10.0m, increased shareholder equity from $29.9m (2021) to $37,25m, cash flow generation of $5.9m which reduced net debt from $3.0m (2021) to $.9m, diluted Earnings per share decreased by 16.7% to $.040 (2021:$.048), after tax profit decreased 14.2% to $7.8m to (2021:$9.1m)

The Company posted full year 2023 results on 2 of May 2024. The company had its sixth successive year of record revenue. The results financial highlights included increased revenue by 19% from $42.2.0m (2022) to $50.0 m and EBITDA of $10.85m. Additional highlights include a bank debt to EBITDA ratio of .50 for year-end 2023 compared to .59 for year-end 2022.

== Operations ==
The company operates the following main two U.S. entities:

- Iofina Resources
- Iofina Chemical

=== Iofina Resources ===
Iofina Resources develops, builds, owns and operates iodine extraction plants using Iofina's Wellhead Extraction Technology WET IOsorb technology. Iofina currently operates five producing IOsorb plants in Oklahoma, and is consistently using technology and innovation to improve and expand its operations.

=== Iofina Chemical ===
Iofina Chemical has manufactured high quality halogen specialty chemicals derived from raw iodine, as well as non-iodine based products for over 35 years.
