= MainSource Bank =

US bank

MainSource Financial Group
- Trade name: MainSource Bank
- Formerly: Indiana United Bancorp (1983–2002)
- Company type: Public
- Traded as: Nasdaq: MSFG (2002–2018)
- Industry: Banking
- Defunct: April 2, 2018; 8 years ago
- Fate: Merged with First Financial Bancorp
- Headquarters: Greensburg, Indiana, United States
- Area served: Indiana, Illinois, Kentucky, and Ohio
- Key people: Archie Brown, Jr (president/CEO)
- Products: Banking and Mortgages
- Website: Last version of website prior to merger

MainSource Bank was a community bank located in Greensburg, Indiana. The company was the operating subsidiary of the MainSource Financial Group. It operated banks in Indiana, Illinois, Kentucky, and Ohio. On May 25, 2018, all MainSource locations closed as part of the acquisition by First Financial Bancorp. Most locations reopened May 29, 2018 as First Financial Bank locations, but some locations remained closed if there was a redundant location nearby.

The United States Treasury purchased $57 million in shares of MainSource Financial Group under the Troubled Asset Relief Program. The Treasury sold all of its shares in the company in March 2012.

== History ==
Indiana United Bancorp was formed in 1983 by Robert Hoptry and Howard Sanders with the sole purpose of acquiring the financially troubled Union Bank and Trust Co. of Greensburg. Hoptry and Sanders were former executives who were ousted from a Kentucky bank after losing in an internal struggle for control of the Kentucky bank. Under Hoptry's leadership, Indiana United Bancorp grew by acquiring other banks as soon as the state of Indiana started to loosen banking restrictions that required banks and bank holding companies to refrain from operating beyond certain geographical restrictions.

In February 2002, Indiana United Bancorp announced plans to consolidating the holding company's many separate banking units throughout the state of Indiana that operated under various names into a single bank to be named MainSource Bank, starting with the merger of the two largest units, People's Trust Co. of Brookville, and Union Bank of Greensburg in March to form an operating unit with 35 banking offices in 14 Indiana counties. The other subsidiary banks were also merged into MainSource as soon as the necessary regulatory approvals were obtained. At the same time, it was announced that the name of holding company was going to be changed to MainSource Financial Group, which was completed in May with its Nasdaq trading symbol changed from IUBC to MSFG.

In March 2005, MainSource Financial Group announced the pending acquisition of the Madison-based Madison Bank & Trust Company from National City Corporation for an undisclosed amount. The acquisition was completed in August 2005.

As a prelude to retirement, Hoptry relinquished his positions as president and CEO to Archie Brown in 2008 while retaining his post as chairman. Brown eventually became chairman in 2011.

In the early 2010s, MainSource Financial Group expanded into new territories within Southern Indiana by opening new branches in Columbus, Seymour and Bloomington.

In early 2016, MainSource expanded into the Cincinnati market by acquiring Cheviot Savings Bank. Cheviot locations closed at the end of May 2016, and reopened as MainSource locations.

In July 2017, MainSource Financial Group and First Financial Bancorp entered into a definitive merger agreement. MainSource is expected to merge into First Financial in the first quarter of 2018. To allow the merger to proceed, the Department of Justice required that MainSource to sell one branch in Greensburg and four branches in Columbus, all in Indiana. Those branches were sold to German American Bancorp in February 2018.

The merger of MainSource and First Financial was made official on April 1, 2018, with branches converted to First Financial branding on May 29, 2018.
