= Jack Wyant =

American venture capitalist

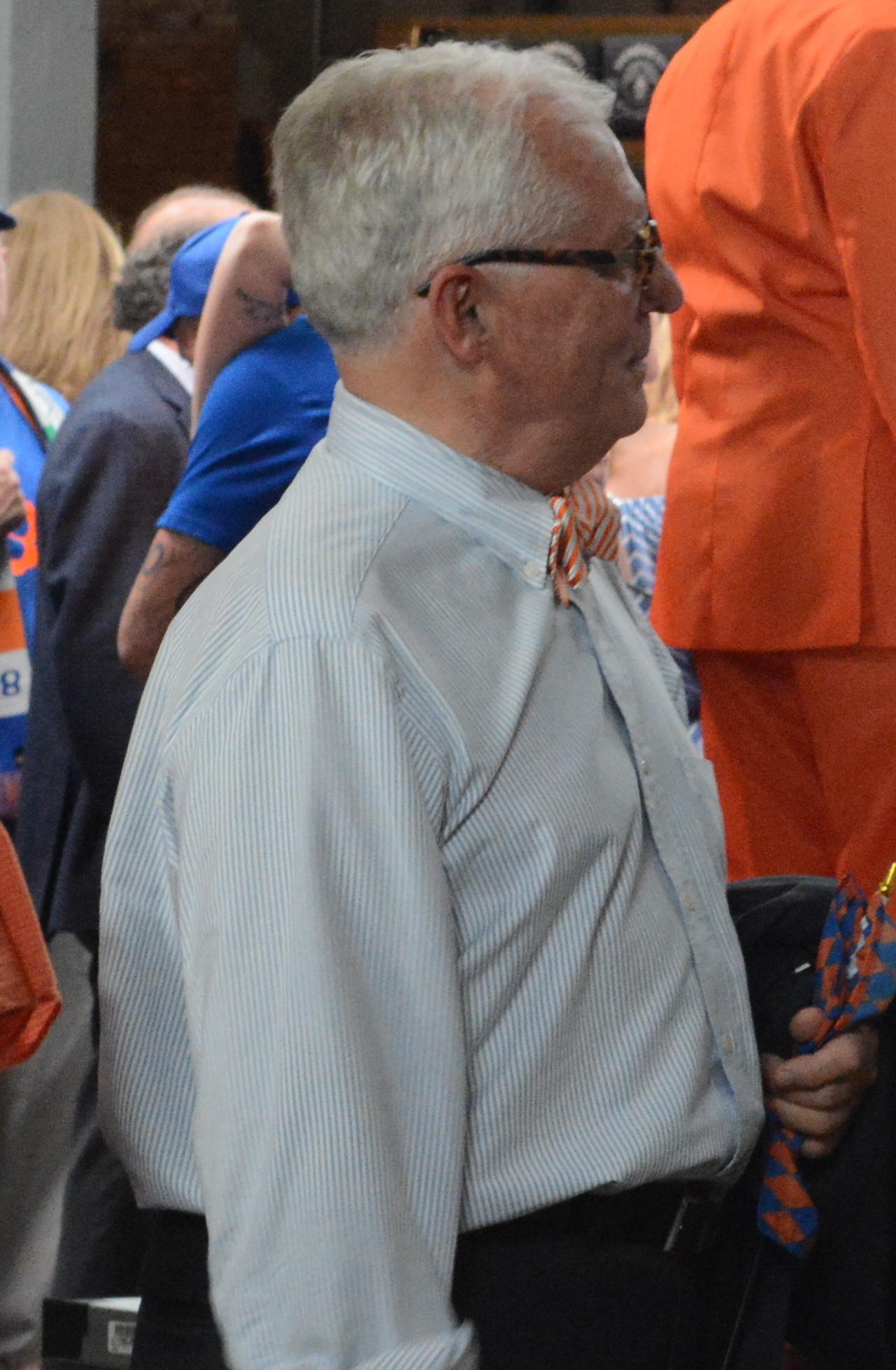
- Wyant at an FC Cincinnati event in 2018
- Born: John H. Wyant; 1946 (age 79–80); Hamilton, Ohio, United States
- Education: Denison University
- Occupation: Venture capitalist
- Organization: Blue Chip Venture Company
- Spouse: Peg Wyant
- Children: Jack Wyant, Missy Wyant, Tim wyant, Chris Wyant

John H. “Jack” Wyant (born 1946) is an American businessman and venture capitalist who founded Blue Chip Venture Company in 1990. As of 2013, he is the company's Managing Director.

== Early life and education ==
Wyant was raised in Hamilton, Ohio, and graduated from Garfield High School there in 1964. He attended Denison University from 1964 to 1968. Wyant was elected president of the chapter of Phi Gamma Delta fraternity in 1967, and he led the local chapter to accept its first African American member in 1968; the fraternity had had a “White Christian” policy since 1848. He has 11 grandchildren.

== Career ==
After graduating from Denison, Wyant worked in brand management at the Procter & Gamble Company.

After Procter & Gamble, Wyant joined the Kings Island division of Taft Broadcasting Company.

In 1975, he helped create and managed a joint venture with the National Football Foundation, which resulted in the design, construction and operation of the College Football Hall of Fame .

In 1977, he graduated from Salmon P. Chase College of Law of Northern Kentucky University with his Juris Doctor.

At Taft, he founded Blue Chip Broadcasting, a radio station group that grew to 20 stations including WIZF-FM. He later sold the company for $180 million.

Wyant was the CEO of two venture-backed companies, Home Entertainment Network and Nutrition Technology Corporation. During this time he produced live sports and musical television specials, negotiated joint ventures, and in 1980, he launched a TV network for the Cincinnati Reds, Chicago White Sox, Blackhawks, Minnesota Twins and North Starts.

In 1990, Wyant founded Blue Chip Venture Company. By 2013 Blue Chip had invested $600 million in over 125 companies through five venture funds, including internet service provider Digex, application service provider USinternetworking, ShareThis, a sharing service on 2 million websites and Richwood Pharmaceutical, developers of Adderall

Wyant is a member of the investment group Queen City Angels, has direct investments in approximately 20 private growth companies, and is a founding investor and director of CBank and of Grandin Properties, family-owned real estate development and management firm of which his wife, Peg, is the CEO.

Wyant is an investor in several sports enterprises, including the Major League Baseball franchise Cincinnati Reds and the Major League Soccer franchise FC Cincinnati.

Wyant is a competitive squash player, and is ranked in US Squash doubles and in 2010 won the national father-son doubles squash century level. In 2011, he served as the U.S. team captain against Canada.

== Writing ==
Wyant has written the books Corporate Governance Handbook for VCs and How to Sell a Business.

== Awards ==
Wyant received a Denison Alumni citation for excellence in entrepreneurship in 1988, the Seal of the City, Cincinnati's highest honor in 1993, and a Lifetime Achievement award from the Greater Cincinnati Venture Association in 2002 for creating the venture capital industry in Cincinnati. In 2007 the Association for Corporate Growth awarded him the Master Dealmaker Award.
