= 2022 Leagues Cup Showcase =

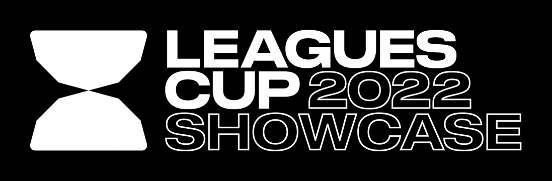

Tournament details
- Host country: United States
- Dates: August 3 – September 22
- Teams: 8 (from 2 associations)
- Venues: 4 (in 4 host cities)

Tournament statistics
- Matches played: 5
- Goals scored: 15 (3 per match)
- Attendance: 118,791 (23,758 per match)
- Top scorer: 15 players (1 goal each)

The 2022 Leagues Cup Showcase was a friendly edition of the Leagues Cup, an annual soccer competition between clubs from Major League Soccer and Liga MX in North America. The event featured five matches between MLS and Liga MX sides, played in August and September 2022. It served as a one-time replacement of the previously-planned 2022 Leagues Cup, which was not held due to fixture congestion from the 2022 FIFA World Cup and other factors.

== Background ==
The third edition of the Leagues Cup was initially planned for 2022, with Allegiant Stadium in Paradise, Nevada, United States chosen as the host for the final. However, on April 14, 2022, MLS and Liga MX announced that the 2022 tournament would not be held due to fixture congestion from the 2022 FIFA World Cup and other factors, and instead would be replaced by a series of friendly matches, known as the Leagues Cup Showcase. According to Major League Soccer, it was intended to "serve as a preview" for the expanded tournament in 2023. As part of the announcement, it was confirmed that the Leagues Cup Showcase would be held on August 3, 2022, at SoFi Stadium in Inglewood, California. The event featured a doubleheader of matches: LA Galaxy against Guadalajara and Los Angeles FC against América. On June 30, 2022, it was announced that the Leagues Cup Showcase would expand to include three more matches—FC Cincinnati against Guadalajara at TQL Stadium in Cincinnati, Ohio; Nashville SC against América at Geodis Park in Nashville, Tennessee, on September 21; and Real Salt Lake against Atlas at America First Field in Sandy, Utah, on September 22.

== Teams ==
The following eight teams (from two associations) participated in the event.

| Association | Team | Location |
|---|---|---|
| Mexico (3 Liga MX teams) | América | Mexico City |
| Mexico (3 Liga MX teams) | Atlas | Guadalajara, Jalisco |
| Mexico (3 Liga MX teams) | Guadalajara | Zapopan, Jalisco |
| United States (5 MLS teams) | FC Cincinnati | Cincinnati, Ohio |
| United States (5 MLS teams) | LA Galaxy | Carson, California |
| United States (5 MLS teams) | Los Angeles FC | Los Angeles, California |
| United States (5 MLS teams) | Nashville SC | Nashville, Tennessee |
| United States (5 MLS teams) | Real Salt Lake | Sandy, Utah |

== Venues ==
| Inglewood, California (Los Angeles Area) | Cincinnati, Ohio | Location of the host cities of the 2022 Leagues Cup Showcase. |
|---|---|---|
| SoFi Stadium | TQL Stadium | Location of the host cities of the 2022 Leagues Cup Showcase. |
| Capacity: 70,240 | Capacity: 26,000 | Location of the host cities of the 2022 Leagues Cup Showcase. |
| Nashville, Tennessee | Sandy, Utah (Salt Lake City Area) | Location of the host cities of the 2022 Leagues Cup Showcase. |
| Geodis Park | America First Field | Location of the host cities of the 2022 Leagues Cup Showcase. |
| Capacity: 30,000 | Capacity: 20,213 | Location of the host cities of the 2022 Leagues Cup Showcase. |

== Matches ==
August 3, 2022
5:30 p.m. PDT

| LA Galaxy (United States) | 2–0 | (Mexico) Guadalajara |
|---|---|---|
| Joveljić 28'; Pérez 62' | Report |

SoFi Stadium, Inglewood, California
Attendance: 71,189
Referee: Luis Enrique Santander (Mexico)

August 3, 2022
8:15 p.m. PDT

| Los Angeles FC (United States) | 0–0 | (Mexico) América |
|---|---|---|
| | Report |
Penalties
| Palacios (penalty missed); Vela (penalty scored); Jennings (penalty scored); Ilie (penalty scored); Bale (penalty scored); Escobar (penalty scored); Cifuentes (penalty missed) | 5–6 | (penalty scored) Valdez; (penalty scored) Martín; (penalty missed) Zendejas; (penalty scored) Campos; (penalty scored) J. Rodríguez; (penalty scored) Cáceres; (penalty scored) Lara |

SoFi Stadium, Inglewood, California
Attendance: 71,189
Referee: Victor Rivas (United States)

September 21, 2022
7:00 p.m. EDT

| FC Cincinnati (United States) | 3–1 | (Mexico) Guadalajara |
|---|---|---|
| Kubo 53'; Harris 69'; Vázquez 77' | Report | Pérez 20' |

TQL Stadium, Cincinnati, Ohio
Attendance: 14,727
Referee: Armando Villarreal (United States)

September 21, 2022
8:00 p.m. CDT

| Nashville SC (United States) | 3–3 | (Mexico) América |
|---|---|---|
| Bauer 6'; Haakenson 14'; Maher 89' | Report | Damm 38'; Layún 51'; Martínez 90+5' |
Penalties
| Leal (penalty missed); Zubak (penalty scored); Maher (penalty scored); Haakenson (penalty scored); Anunga (penalty scored) | 4–2 | (penalty missed) Fidalgo; (penalty scored) Viñas; (penalty missed) Martínez; (penalty scored) Layún |

Geodis Park, Nashville, Tennessee
Attendance: 24,553
Referee: César Ramos (Mexico)

September 22, 2022
8:00 p.m. MDT

| Real Salt Lake (United States) | 1–2 | (Mexico) Atlas |
|---|---|---|
| Herrera 17' | Report | Zaldívar 41'; Rodríguez 71' |

America First Field, Sandy, Utah
Attendance: 8,322
Referee: Joe Dickerson (United States)
