= First Financial Bank (Ohio) =

Regional bank headquartered in Cincinnati, Ohio

First Financial Bancorp

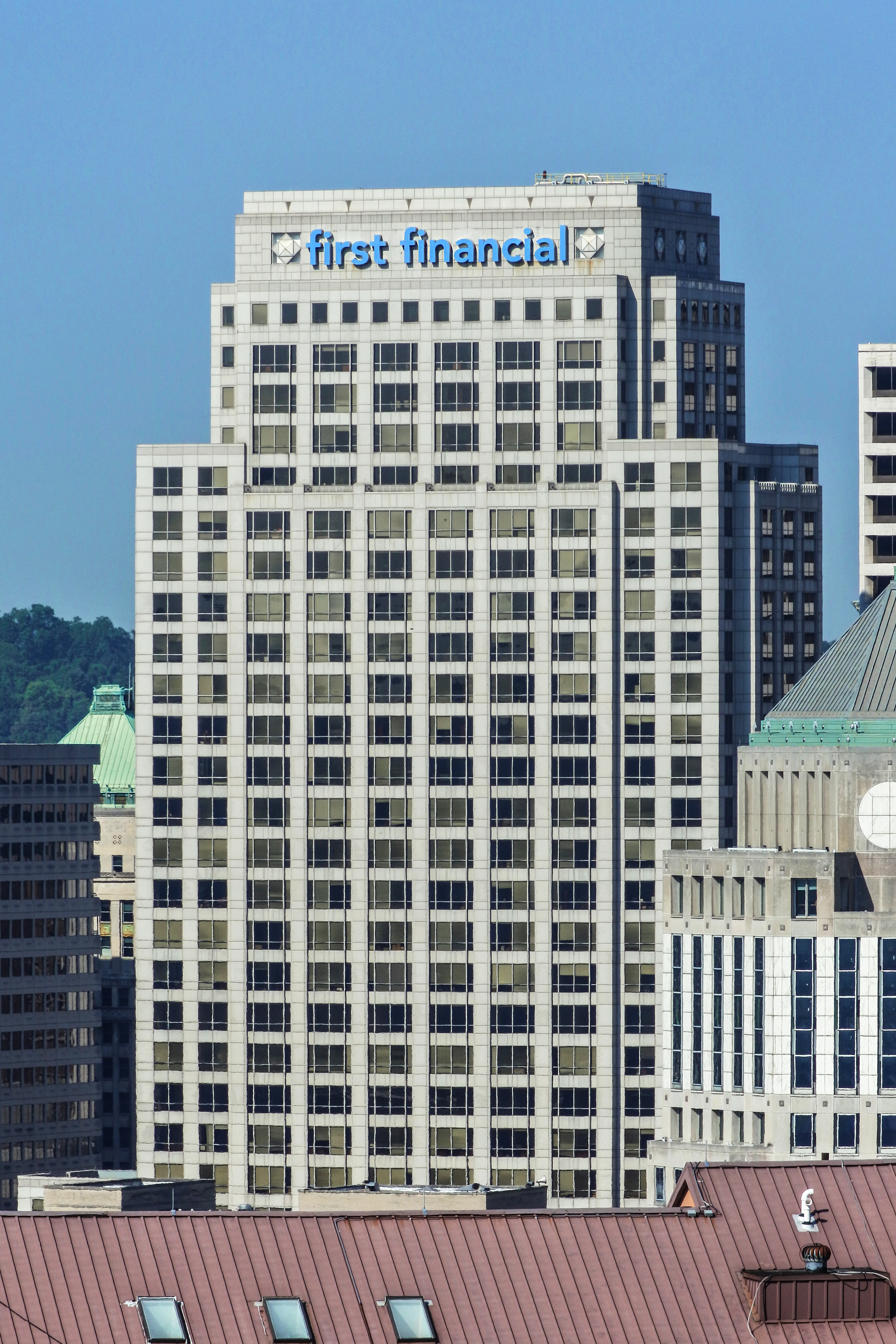
- First Financial Bank headquarters in Cincinnati
- Trade name: First Financial Bank
- Type: Public
- Traded as: Nasdaq: FFBC; S&P 600 component
- Industry: Banking
- Founded: August 15, 1863; 163 years ago in Hamilton, Ohio as the First National Bank of Hamilton
- Headquarters: Cincinnati, Ohio
- Area served: Ohio, Illinois, Indiana and Kentucky
- Key people: Archie Brown (CEO)
- Revenue: ▲US$545 million (2018)
- Operating income: ▲US$449 million (2018)
- Net income: ▲US$172 million (2018)
- Total assets: ▲US$14 billion (2018)
- Total equity: ▼US$2 billion (2018)
- Website: bankatfirst.com

First Financial Bancorp is a regional bank headquartered in Cincinnati, Ohio, with its operations centers in the northern Cincinnati suburb of Springdale, and Greensburg, Indiana. Founded in 1863, First Financial has the sixth oldest national bank charter and has 131 locations throughout Ohio, Indiana, Kentucky, and Illinois. First Financial acquired Irwin Financial Corp and its subsidiaries through a government assisted transaction on September 18, 2009.

The company's subsidiary, First Financial Bank, N.A., founded in 1863, provides banking and financial services products through its three lines of business: commercial, consumer and wealth management. The commercial and consumer units provide traditional banking services to business and consumer clients. First Financial Wealth Management provides wealth planning, portfolio management, trust and estate, brokerage and retirement plan services and had approximately $15.9 billion in assets as of September 30, 2020.

== History ==
First Financial Bank, N.A., was founded in 1863 as the First National Bank of Hamilton and was granted charter number 56 on August 10, 1863, under the National Bank Act. The bank opened its first branch in Hamilton, Ohio and started business on August 15, 1863. In 1923, the bank's name was changed to First National Bank and Trust Company of Hamilton when the trust division was created.

In 1980, the First National Bank of Hamilton consolidated operations with the First National Bank of Middletown to form the First National Bank of Southwestern Ohio. The acquisition of smaller institutions allowed it to expand outside Butler County. First Financial Bancorp, a holding company, was formed in 1983.

In 2008, First Financial Bancorp relocated its headquarters to Norwood while the headquarters for the bank remained in Hamilton. The following year, the holding company moved their headquarters to the Atrium One building in Downtown Cincinnati before finally settling into the Chemed Center building, renamed First Financial Center, in 2011.

In July 2017, First Financial agreed to purchase Greensburg, Indiana based MainSource Bank for $1 billion, making First Financial the fourth-largest bank in Cincinnati, and the second-largest local bank. The combined organization will continue to be called First Financial Bancorp. The acquisition was finalized on April 2, 2018. All MainSource computer systems and deposits were transitioned to First Financial on May 29, 2018.

In June 2025, First Financial announced that it has entered into a definitive agreement to acquire Westfield Bancorp, in a cash and stock transaction, from Ohio Farmers Insurance Company.

In December 2025, it was announced that First Financial had received regulatory approval to complete its acquisition of BankFinancial, a Chicago-based financial institution. The all-stock transaction, valued at approximately $142 million and expected to close in early 2026 subject to shareholder approval, expanded First Financial’s operations into the Chicago metropolitan area, where BankFinancial operated 18 financial centres.
