= All-time FC Cincinnati (MLS) roster =

This list comprises all players who have played for FC Cincinnati since the team's inaugural Major League Soccer season in 2019.

A "†" denotes players who did not appear in a single match but were available for fixtures. Players who were acquired by the team but were not available to play in matches (e.g. selected in a draft but not signed, or acquired in a trade but immediately traded away) are not listed.

A "‡" denotes players who also played for FC Cincinnati in the USL before expansion to MLS.

Bolded players are currently under contract by FC Cincinnati.

Stats include all competitive matches (MLS, MLS Cup Playoffs, U.S. Open Cup, CONCACAF Champions League, etc).

All stats accurate as of match played November 7, 2021.

== Players ==
=== Outfield players ===
Name	D.O.B.	Position	Nationality	Years	Games	Goals	Debut	Ref
Saad Abdul-Salaam	September 8, 1991	DF	United States	2020	8	0	July 11, 2020	
**Luciano Acosta**	May 31, 1994	MF	Argentina	2021–present	31	7	April 17, 2021	
Fanendo Adi ‡	October 10, 1990	FW	Nigeria	2019	14	2	March 2, 2019	
Fatai Alashe ‡	October 21, 1993	MF	United States	2019–2020	17	1	April 19, 2019	
Nazmi Albadawi ‡	August 24, 1991	MF	Palestine	2019	1	0	May 25, 2019	
Eric Alexander	April 14, 1988	MF	United States	2019	8	0	March 2, 2019	
Frankie Amaya	September 27, 2000	MF	United States	2019–2021	43	1	March 30, 2019	
Marco Angulo	May 8, 2002	MF	Ecuador	2023–2024	33	0	March 4, 2023	
**Isaac Atanga**	June 14, 2000	FW	Ghana	2021–present	22	1	May 1, 2021	
**Zico Bailey**	August 27, 2000	DF	United States	2020–present	16	1	October 7, 2020	
**Álvaro Barreal**	August 17, 2000	FW	Argentina	2020–present	38	3	October 7, 2020	
Leonardo Bertone	March 14, 1994	MF	Switzerland	2019	26	1	March 2, 2019	
**Tyler Blackett**	April 2, 1994	DF	England	2021–2022	11	1	September 18, 2021	
Corben Bone ‡	September 16, 1988	MF	United States	2019	96	13	March 2, 2019	
**Brenner**	January 16, 2000	FW	Brazil	2021–2023	33	8	April 17, 2021	
**Geoff Cameron**	July 11, 1985	MF	United States	2021–2022	28	0	May 16, 2021	
**Edgar Castillo**	October 8, 1986	DF	United States	2021–2022	14	1	June 19, 2021	
**Allan Cruz**	February 24, 1996	MF	Costa Rica	2019–2022	59	9	March 10, 2019	
Rashawn Dally	January 14, 1997	FW	Jamaica	2019–2020	17	1	June 12, 2019	
Siem de Jong	January 28, 1989	MF	Netherlands	2020	16	0	July 11, 2020	
Mathieu Deplagne	October 1, 1991	DF	France	2019–2020	51	1	March 2, 2019	
**Chris Duvall**	September 10, 1991	DF	United States	2021–present	4	0	August 21, 2021	
Derrick Etienne	November 25, 1996	MF	Haiti	2019	5	0	August 10, 2019	
**Avionne Flanagan** †	April 6, 1999	DF	United States	2021–present	0	0	N/A	
Greg Garza	August 16, 1991	DF	United States	2019–2020	22	0	March 10, 2019	
Logan Gdula †	October 13, 1996	DF	United States	2019	0	0	N/A	
Andrew Gutman	October 2, 1996	DF	United States	2019–2020	30	0	August 10, 2019	
**Joe Gyau**	September 16, 1992	MF	United States	2019–present	51	1	August 10, 2019	
**Nick Hagglund**	September 14, 1992	DF	United States	2019–present	59	2	March 2, 2019	
**Calvin Harris**	March 20, 2000	FW	England	2021–present	16	0	April 17, 2021	
Justin Hoyte ‡	November 20, 1984	DF	Trinidad and Tobago	2019	18	0	April 13, 2019	
Franko Kovačević	August 8, 1999	FW	Croatia	2020–2021	4	0	November 8, 2020	
**Yuya Kubo**	December 24, 1993	FW	Japan	2020–present	49	3	March 1, 2020	
Roland Lamah	December 31, 1987	MF	Belgium	2019	28	1	March 2, 2019	
Forrest Lasso ‡	May 11, 1993	DF	United States	2019	7	0	March 24, 2019	
Emmanuel Ledesma ‡	May 24, 1988	MF	Argentina	2019	28	6	March 17, 2019	
Jürgen Locadia	November 7, 1993	FW	Netherlands	2020–2021	27	3	March 1, 2020	
Kekuta Manneh	December 30, 1994	FW	(The Gambia) Gambia	2019–2020	32	5	March 2, 2019	
**Rónald Matarrita**	July 9, 1994	DF	Costa Rica	2021–present	22	2	April 17, 2021	
Darren Mattocks	September 2, 1990	FW	Jamaica	2019	21	3	March 2, 2019	
Tommy McCabe	April 4, 1998	MF	United States	2019–2020	7	0	June 29, 2019	
Jimmy McLaughlin ‡	April 30, 1993	MF	United States	2019–2020	1	0	October 28, 2020	
**Haris Medunjanin**	March 8, 1985	MF	Bosnia and Herzegovina	2020–present	51	4	March 1, 2020	
**Ben Mines** †	May 13, 2000	MF	United States	2021–present	0	0	N/A	
**Kamohelo Mokotjo**	March 11, 1991	MF	South Africa	2020–present	22	0	October 3, 2020	
Hassan Ndam †	October 9, 1998	DF	Cameroon	2019–2020	0	0	N/A	
**Arquimides Ordonez**	August 5, 2003	FW	United States	2021–present	4	0	July 24, 2021	
Rey Ortiz †	January 6, 1997	FW	United States	2020	0	0	N/A	
Tom Pettersson	March 25, 1990	DF	Sweden	2020–2021	20	0	July 11, 2020	
Alvas Powell	July 18, 1994	DF	Jamaica	2019	13	0	March 2, 2019	
Adrien Regattin	August 22, 1991	MF	Morocco	2020	11	0	March 1, 2020	
Kenny Saief	December 17, 1993	MF	United States	2019	9	1	March 10, 2019	
**Kyle Scott**	December 22, 1997	MF	United States	2021–present	4	0	October 16, 2021	
Blake Smith †	January 17, 1991	DF	United States	2019	0	0	N/A	
**Caleb Stanko**	July 26, 1993	MF	United States	2019–present	59	0	March 2, 2019	
Víctor Ulloa	March 4, 1992	MF	Mexico	2019	28	1	March 2, 2019	
**Gustavo Vallecilla**	May 28, 1999	DF	Ecuador	2021–present	25	2	May 16, 2021	
**Florian Valot**	February 12, 1993	MF	France	2021–present	9	0	August 7, 2021	
**Maikel van der Werff**	April 22, 1989	DF	Netherlands	2019–present	24	0	July 27, 2019	
**Brandon Vazquez**	October 14, 1998	FW	United States	2020–present	50	6	March 1, 2020	
Kendall Waston	January 1, 1988	DF	Costa Rica	2019–2020	43	1	March 2, 2019	
Emery Welshman †‡	November 9, 1991	FW	Guyana	2019	0	0	N/A	

=== Goalkeepers ===
Name	D.O.B.	Pos	Nationality	Years	Games	Conceded	Shutouts	Debut	Ref
Cody Cropper	February 16, 1993	GK	United States	2021	1	5	0	April 24, 2021	
Bobby Edwards	August 11, 1995	GK	United States	2020	2	3	0	October 14, 2020	
Jimmy Hague †	August 28, 1996	GK	United States	2019	0	0	0	N/A	
**Ben Lundt** †	September 24, 1995	GK	Germany	2019–present	0	0	0	N/A	
Spencer Richey ‡	May 30, 1992	GK	United States	2019–2020	29	60	5	March 10, 2019	
**Beckham Sunderland** †	June 30, 2003	GK	United States	2020–present	0	0	0	N/A	
**Przemysław Tytoń**	January 4, 1987	GK	Poland	2019–present	45	86	11	March 2, 2019	
**Kenneth Vermeer**	January 10, 1986	GK	Netherlands	2021–present	19	34	4	May 16, 2021	

== By nationality ==
MLS regulations allow for eight international roster slots per team to be used on non-domestic players. However, this limit can be exceeded by trading international slots with another MLS team. Overseas players are exempt from counting towards this total if they have permanent residency rights in the U.S. (green card holder), other special dispensation such as refugee or asylum status, or qualify under the Homegrown International Rule. In total, 59 players representing 25 countries have played for FC Cincinnati.

Note: Countries indicate national team as defined under FIFA eligibility rules. Players may hold more than one non-FIFA nationality.

Country	Total players
Argentina	3
Belgium	1
Brazil	1
Bosnia and Herzegovina	1
Costa Rica	3
Croatia	1
Ecuador	1
England	2
France	2
Gambia	1
Ghana	1
Haiti	1
Jamaica	3
Japan	1
Mexico	1
Morocco	1
Netherlands	4
Nigeria	1
Palestine	1
Poland	1
South Africa	1
Sweden	1
Switzerland	1
Trinidad and Tobago	1
United States	24

== Sources ==
- By Season | MLSsoccer.com
