= 2019 FC Cincinnati season =

Season of American association football team

FC Cincinnati
2019 season
- General manager: Gerard Nijkamp
- Head coach: Ron Jans
- Stadium: Nippert Stadium
- MLS: Conference: 12th Overall: 24th
- MLS Cup Playoffs: Did not qualify
- U.S. Open Cup: Round of 16
- Highest home attendance: 32,250
- Lowest home attendance: 25,095
- Average home league attendance: 27,507
- Biggest win: 3–0 (March 17 vs. POR)
- Biggest defeat: 1–7 (June 29 at MIN)
| Home colors | Away colors |

The 2019 FC Cincinnati season was the club's debut season in Major League Soccer (MLS), and the fourth season of a team playing under the FC Cincinnati brand after three years in the lower-division United Soccer League (since renamed the USL Championship). The club finished with a league worst 6–22–6 record in their inaugural MLS season, setting a league record for the most goals given up with 75. FC Cincinnati missed the playoffs.

== Club ==
=== Coaching staff ===
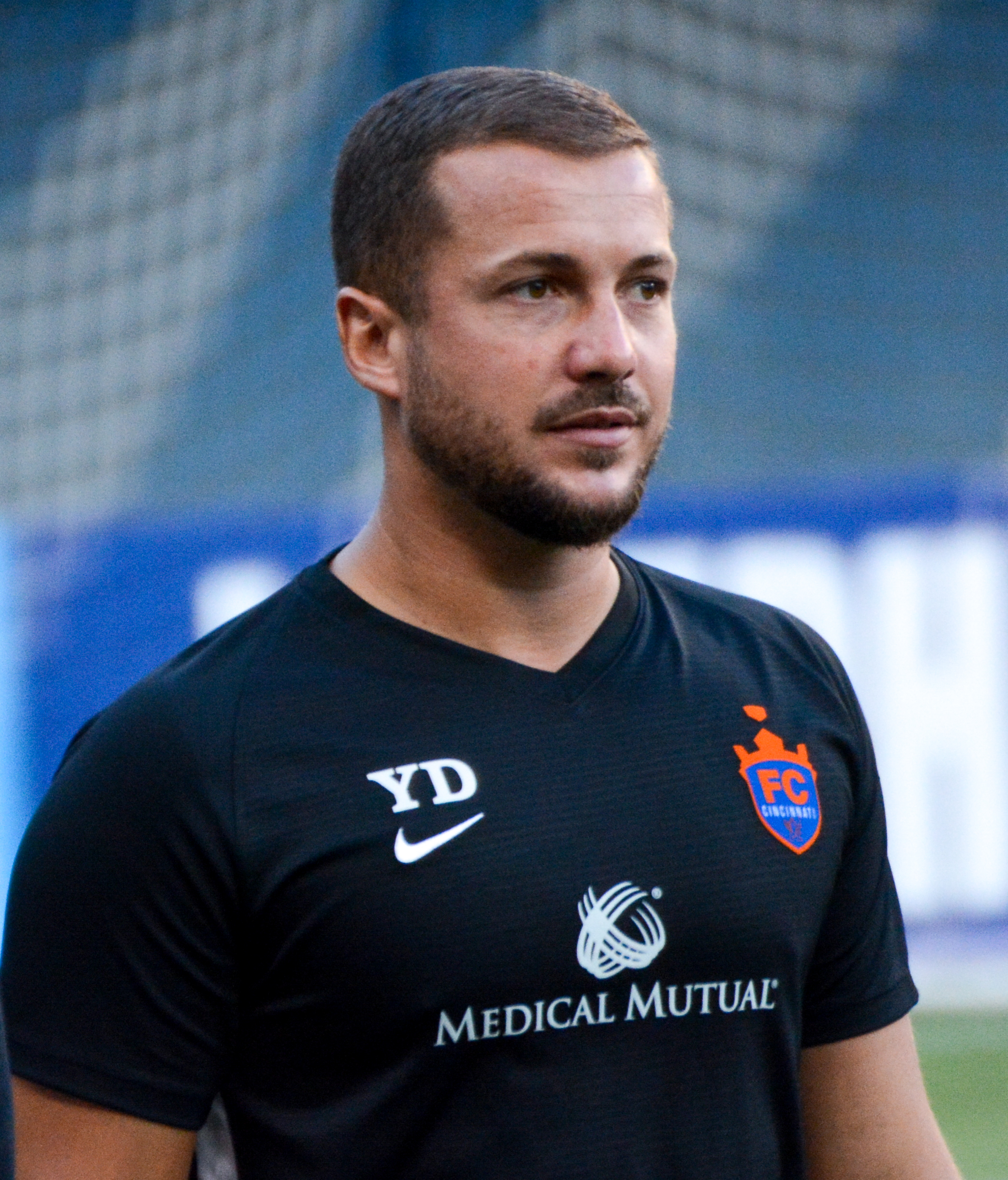
Yoann Damet became interim head coach after Alan Koch was fired on May 7 after 11 games.

| Position | Staff |
|---|---|
| General Manager | (Netherlands) Gerard Nijkamp |
| Technical Director | (United States) Luke Sassano |
| Head Coach | (Netherlands) Ron Jans |
| Assistant Coach | (France) Yoann Damet |
| Goalkeeper Coach | (United States) Jack Stern |
| Athletic Trainer | (United States) Aaron Powell |
| Strength & Conditioning | (United States) Austin Berry |
| UC Health | (United States) Dr. Angelo Colosimo (United States) Dr. Brian Grawe |

Head coach Alan Koch was fired on May 7, 2019, after a 2–7–2 start to the 2019 season. Yoann Damet served as interim coach until Ron Jans was named head coach on August 3, 2019, becoming the third head coach since the club moved to the MLS.

=== Roster ===
As of match played August 3, 2019

| No. | Name | Nationality | Position | Date of birth (age) | Previous club |
Goalkeepers
| 13 | Jimmy Hague | United States | GK | August 28, 1996 (age 29) | (United States) Michigan State Spartans |
| 18 | Spencer Richey | United States | GK | May 30, 1992 (age 33) | (United States) FC Cincinnati (USL) |
| 22 | Przemysław Tytoń | Poland | GK | January 4, 1987 (age 39) | (Spain) Deportivo de La Coruña |
Defenders
| 2 | Kendall Waston (c) | Costa Rica | DF | January 1, 1988 (age 38) | (Canada) Vancouver Whitecaps FC |
| 4 | Greg Garza | United States | DF | August 16, 1991 (age 34) | (United States) Atlanta United FC |
| 14 | Nick Hagglund | United States | DF | September 14, 1992 (age 33) | (Canada) Toronto FC |
| 17 | Mathieu Deplagne | France | DF | October 1, 1991 (age 34) | (France) Troyes AC |
| 23 | Maikel van der Werff | Netherlands | DF | April 22, 1989 (age 36) | (Netherlands) SBV Vitesse |
| 32 | Justin Hoyte | Trinidad and Tobago | DF | November 20, 1984 (age 41) | (United States) FC Cincinnati (USL) |
| 92 | Alvas Powell | Jamaica | DF | July 18, 1994 (age 31) | (United States) Portland Timbers |
| 96 | Andrew Gutman | United States | DF | October 2, 1996 (age 29) | (Scotland) Celtic FC |
Midfielders
| 6 | Leonardo Bertone | Switzerland | MF | March 14, 1994 (age 31) | (Switzerland) BSC Young Boys |
| 7 | Roland Lamah | Belgium | MF | December 31, 1987 (age 38) | (United States) FC Dallas |
| 8 | Víctor Ulloa | Mexico | MF | March 4, 1992 (age 34) | (United States) FC Dallas |
| 15 | Allan Cruz | Costa Rica | MF | February 24, 1996 (age 30) | (Costa Rica) C.S. Herediano |
| 16 | Derrick Etienne Jr. | United States | MF | August 25, 1996 (age 29) | (United States) New York Red Bulls |
| 19 | Corben Bone | United States | MF | September 16, 1988 (age 37) | (United States) FC Cincinnati (USL) |
| 20 | Jimmy McLaughlin | United States | MF | April 30, 1993 (age 32) | (United States) FC Cincinnati (USL) |
| 24 | Frankie Amaya | United States | MF | September 26, 2000 (age 25) | (United States) UCLA Bruins |
| 26 | Tommy McCabe | United States | MF | April 4, 1998 (age 27) | (United States) Notre Dame Fighting Irish |
| 27 | Fatai Alashe | United States | MF | October 21, 1993 (age 32) | (United States) FC Cincinnati (USL) |
| 33 | Caleb Stanko | United States | MF | July 26, 1993 (age 32) | (Germany) SC Freiburg |
| 36 | Joe Gyau | United States | MF | September 16, 1992 (age 33) | (Germany) MSV Duisburg |
| 45 | Emmanuel Ledesma | Argentina | MF | May 24, 1988 (age 37) | (United States) FC Cincinnati (USL) |
| 93 | Kenny Saief | United States | MF | December 17, 1993 (age 32) | (Belgium) Anderlecht |
Forwards
| 9 | Fanendo Adi | Nigeria | FW | October 10, 1990 (age 35) | (United States) FC Cincinnati (USL) |
| 11 | Darren Mattocks | Jamaica | FW | September 2, 1990 (age 35) | (United States) D.C. United |
| 31 | Kekuta Manneh | Gambia | FW | December 4, 1994 (age 31) | (Switzerland) FC St. Gallen |
| 81 | Rashawn Dally | Jamaica | FW | January 14, 1997 (age 29) | (United States) Memphis 901 FC |

=== 2019 MLS SuperDraft picks ===
| Round | Pick # | Player | Position | College | Notes |
|---|---|---|---|---|---|
| 1 | 1 | (United States) Frankie Amaya | Midfielder | UCLA | |
| 1 | 13 | (United States) Logan Gdula | Defender | Wake Forest | From Philadelphia Union |
| 2 | 29 | (United States) Tommy McCabe | Midfielder | Notre Dame | From Philadelphia Union via Chicago Fire |
| 2 | 30 | (United States) Jimmy Hague | Goalkeeper | Michigan State | From Toronto FC |
| 2 | 37 | (Germany) Ben Lundt | Goalkeeper | Akron | From Philadelphia Union |
| 3 | 49 | (Jamaica) Rashawn Dally | Midfielder | Quinnipiac | |

== Player movement ==
=== In ===
| Date | Player | Position | From Club | Ref |
|---|---|---|---|---|
| July 2, 2019 | (Netherlands) Maikel van der Werff | DF | (Netherlands) SBV Vitesse | |
| August 7, 2019 | (United States) Joe Gyau | MF | (Germany) MSV Duisburg | |

=== Out ===
| Date | Player | Position | Notes | Transferred to | Ref |
|---|---|---|---|---|---|
| August 2, 2019 | (Guyana) Emery Welshman | F | Waived | (Israel) Hapoel Haifa FC | |
| August 5, 2019 | (United States) Eric Alexander | MF | Waived | (United States) FC Dallas | |

=== Loans in ===
| Player | Position | Loaned from | Loan start date | Loan end date | Ref |
|---|---|---|---|---|---|
| (United States) Caleb Stanko | MF | (Germany) SC Freiburg | January 23, 2019 | | |
| (United States) Kenny Saief | MF | (Belgium) Anderlecht | March 6, 2019 | June 11, 2019 | |
| (United States) Andrew Gutman | DF | (Scotland) Celtic FC | August 3, 2019 | End of 2020 season | |
| (United States) Derrick Etienne | MF | (United States) New York Red Bulls | August 7, 2019 | End of 2019 season | |

=== Loans out ===
| Player | Position | Loaned to | Loan start date | Loan end date | Ref |
|---|---|---|---|---|---|
| (Germany) Ben Lundt | G | (United States) Louisville City FC | February 7, 2019 | | |
| (United States) Tommy McCabe | MF | (United States) North Carolina FC | February 15, 2019 | May 29, 2019 | |
| (United States) Logan Gdula | DF | (United States) Hartford Athletic | August 5, 2019 | | |
| (Jamaica) Rashawn Dally | F | (United States) Memphis 901 | March 5, 2019 | May 20, 2019 | |
| (Guyana) Emery Welshman | F | (Canada) Forge FC | March 8, 2019 | August 2, 2019 | |
| (United States) Frankie Amaya | MF | (United States) Orange County SC | April 17, 2019 | May 2, 2019 | |
| (Cameroon) Hassan Ndam | DF | (United States) Charlotte Independence | May 1, 2019 | | |
| (Palestine) Nazmi Albadawi | MF | (United States) North Carolina FC | May 29, 2019 | | |
| (United States) Forrest Lasso | DF | (United States) Nashville SC | July 25, 2019 | | |

== Competitions ==
Win Draw Loss

=== Major League Soccer ===
==== League tables ====
===== Eastern Conference =====
2019 MLS Eastern Conference standings
| Pos | Team | Pld | W | L | T | GF | GA | GD | Pts |
|---|---|---|---|---|---|---|---|---|---|
| 8 | Chicago Fire | 34 | 10 | 12 | 12 | 55 | 47 | +8 | 42 |
| 9 | Montreal Impact | 34 | 12 | 17 | 5 | 47 | 60 | −13 | 41 |
| 10 | Columbus Crew SC | 34 | 10 | 16 | 8 | 39 | 47 | −8 | 38 |
| 11 | Orlando City SC | 34 | 9 | 15 | 10 | 44 | 52 | −8 | 37 |
| 12 | FC Cincinnati | 34 | 6 | 22 | 6 | 31 | 75 | −44 | 24 |

Source: MLS
Rules for classification: 1) points; 2) total wins; 3) total goal differential; 4) total goals scored; 5) disciplinary points; 6) away goal differential; 7) away goals scored; 8) home goals scored; 9) home goal differential; 10) coin toss or drawing of lots.

===== Overall =====
2019 MLS regular season standings
| Pos | Team | Pld | W | L | T | GF | GA | GD | Pts |
|---|---|---|---|---|---|---|---|---|---|
| 20 | Columbus Crew SC | 34 | 10 | 16 | 8 | 39 | 47 | −8 | 38 |
| 21 | Sporting Kansas City | 34 | 10 | 16 | 8 | 49 | 67 | −18 | 38 |
| 22 | Orlando City SC | 34 | 9 | 15 | 10 | 44 | 52 | −8 | 37 |
| 23 | Vancouver Whitecaps FC | 34 | 8 | 16 | 10 | 37 | 59 | −22 | 34 |
| 24 | FC Cincinnati | 34 | 6 | 22 | 6 | 31 | 75 | −44 | 24 |

Source: MLS
Rules for classification: 1) points; 2) total wins; 3) total goal differential; 4) total goals scored; 5) disciplinary points; 6) away goals scored; 7) away goal differential; 8) coin toss or drawing of lots

==== Results ====
| Overall | | | | | | | | Home | | | | | | Away | | | | | |
| Pld | W | D | L | GF | GA | GD | Pts | W | D | L | GF | GA | GD | W | D | L | GF | GA | GD |
|---|---|---|---|---|---|---|---|---|---|---|---|---|---|---|---|---|---|---|---|
| 34 | 6 | 6 | 22 | 31 | 75 | −44 | 24 | 3 | 3 | 11 | 15 | 36 | −21 | 3 | 3 | 11 | 16 | 39 | −23 |

Last updated: October 7, 2019.
Source: MLS

| Matchday | 1 | 2 | 3 | 4 | 5 | 6 | 7 | 8 | 9 | 10 | 11 | 12 | 13 | 14 | 15 | 16 | 17 | 18 | 19 | 20 | 21 | 22 | 23 | 24 | 25 | 26 | 27 | 28 | 29 | 30 | 31 | 32 | 33 | 34 |
|---|---|---|---|---|---|---|---|---|---|---|---|---|---|---|---|---|---|---|---|---|---|---|---|---|---|---|---|---|---|---|---|---|---|---|
| Stadium | A | A | H | A | H | H | A | H | A | A | A | H | A | H | A | A | H | A | H | A | H | H | A | H | A | H | H | A | H | A | H | H | H | A |
| Result | L | D | W | W | L | D | L | L | L | L | L | W | L | L | L | L | L | L | W | W | L | L | L | L | D | L | L | L | L | W | L | D | D | D |

Source: MLS
A = Away; H = Home; W = Win; D = Draw; L = Loss

| March 2, 2019 1 | Seattle Sounders FC | 4–1 | FC Cincinnati | Seattle, Washington |
| 10:00 p.m. EDT | Leerdam 27'; Morris 33', 43'; Ruidíaz 87' | Report | Bertone 13'; Adi (yellow card) 46' | Stadium: CenturyLink Field; Attendance: 39,011; Referee: Chris Penso |

| March 10, 2019 2 | Atlanta United FC | 1–1 | FC Cincinnati | Atlanta, Georgia |
| 5:00 p.m. EDT | Martínez 5'; Pírez (yellow card) 11' | Report | Lamah 86' | Stadium: Mercedes-Benz Stadium; Attendance: 70,382; Referee: Allen Chapman |

| March 17, 2019 3 | FC Cincinnati | 3–0 | Portland Timbers | Cincinnati, Ohio |
| 5:00 p.m. EDT | Waston 15', (yellow card) 46'; Cruz 61'; Deplagne 63'; Bertone (yellow card) 90' | Report | Mabiala (yellow card) 45+4' (yellow-red card) 70'; Melano (yellow card) 65' | Stadium: Nippert Stadium; Attendance: 32,250; Referee: Ismail Elfath |

| March 24, 2019 4 | New England Revolution | 0–2 | FC Cincinnati | Foxborough, Massachusetts |
| 4:00 p.m. EDT | Mlinar (yellow card) 52'; Fagúndez (yellow card) 74' | Report | Manneh 44'; Saief 65'; Bertone (yellow card) 73' | Stadium: Gillette Stadium; Attendance: 10,605; Referee: Joseph Dickerson |

| March 30, 2019 5 | FC Cincinnati | 0–2 | Philadelphia Union | Cincinnati, Ohio |
| 7:30 p.m. EDT | | Report | Fabián 47'; Accam 58' | Stadium: Nippert Stadium; Attendance: 25,867; Referee: Rubiel Vazquez |

| April 7, 2019 6 | FC Cincinnati | 1–1 | Sporting Kansas City | Cincinnati, Ohio |
| 3:00 p.m. EDT | Mattocks 19' (pen.); Garza (yellow card) 78'; Bertone (yellow card) 88' | Report | Fontas (yellow card) 18'; Croizet (yellow card) 35'; Zelalem (yellow card) 38'; Busio 62'; Baráth (yellow card) 90+3' | Stadium: Nippert Stadium; Attendance: 26,023; Referee: Ismail Elfath |

| April 13, 2019 7 | Los Angeles FC | 2–0 | FC Cincinnati | Los Angeles, California |
| 10:30 p.m. EDT | Kaye 32'; Zimmerman (yellow card) 36'; Vela 90+3' | Report | Waston (yellow card) 30' | Stadium: Banc of California Stadium; Attendance: 22,323; Referee: Drew Fischer |

| April 19, 2019 8 | FC Cincinnati | 0–3 | Real Salt Lake | Cincinnati, Ohio |
| 7:30 p.m. EDT | Waston (yellow card) 58' | Report | Rusnák (yellow card) 38', (goal) 42', 59' (pen.); Johnson 45+2'; Baird (yellow card) 45+3' | Stadium: Nippert Stadium; Attendance: 26,416; Referee: Fotis Bazakos |

| April 27, 2019 9 | New York Red Bulls | 1–0 | FC Cincinnati | Harrison, New Jersey |
| 7:00 p.m. EDT | Lade 38'; Muyl (yellow card) 56'; Parker (yellow card) 78'; Jørgensen (yellow card) 90+4' | Report | Hoyte (yellow card) 47'; Bertone (yellow card) 51'; Waston (yellow card) 60' | Stadium: Red Bull Arena; Attendance: 16,848; Referee: Timothy Ford |

| May 1, 2019 10 | Philadelphia Union | 2–0 | FC Cincinnati | Chester, Pennsylvania |
| 7:30 p.m. EDT | Przybylko 63'; Picault 70'; Trusty (yellow card) 81' | Report | | Stadium: Talen Energy Stadium; Attendance: 12,890; Referee: Guido Gonzales Jr. |

| May 4, 2019 11 | San Jose Earthquakes | 1–0 | FC Cincinnati | San Jose, California |
| 10:00 p.m. EDT | Salinas (yellow card) 13'; Espinoza (yellow card) 15' (yellow-red card) 51'; Lima 22', (yellow card) 29' | Report | Stanko (yellow card) 6'; Lasso (yellow card) 31'; Alashe (yellow card) 67' | Stadium: Avaya Stadium; Attendance: 16,743; Referee: David Gantar |

| May 11, 2019 12 | FC Cincinnati | 2–1 | Montreal Impact | Cincinnati, Ohio |
| 1:00 p.m. EDT | Cruz 7'; Alashe 62' | Report | Azira (yellow card) 47'; Okwonkwo 75'; Sagna (yellow card) 87' | Stadium: Nippert Stadium; Attendance: 26,258; Referee: Joseph Dickerson |

| May 19, 2019 13 | Orlando City SC | 5–1 | FC Cincinnati | Orlando, Florida |
| 3:00 p.m. EDT | Akindele 37', 64'; Will Johnson (yellow card) 43'; Méndez (yellow card) 45+4'; Nani 50' (pen.), 59'; Dwyer (yellow card) 74', (goal) 82' | Report | Mattocks 24'; Powell (yellow card) 45+6'; Ulloa (yellow card) 74'; Amaya (yellow card) 75'; Ledesma (yellow card) 87' | Stadium: Orlando City Stadium; Attendance: 22,341; Referee: Nima Saghafi |

| May 25, 2019 14 | FC Cincinnati | 0–2 | New York Red Bulls | Cincinnati, Ohio |
| 7:30 p.m. EDT | Waston (yellow card) 58' | Report | Murillo (yellow card) 39'; Kaku 78'; Fernandez 90+1' | Stadium: Nippert Stadium; Attendance: 28,290; Referee: Fotis Bazakos |

| June 1, 2019 15 | Colorado Rapids | 3–1 | FC Cincinnati | Commerce City, Colorado |
| 8:30 p.m. EDT | Shinyashiki 43'; Mezquida 73'; Rubio 82' | Report | Manneh 72' | Stadium: Dick's Sporting Goods Park; Attendance: 16,998; Referee: Ted Unkel |

| June 6, 2019 16 | New York City FC | 5–2 | FC Cincinnati | New York, New York |
| 7:00 p.m. EDT | Mitriță 11'; Héber 17', 49'; Tajouri-Shradi 29'; Moralez (yellow card) 45+1', (goal) 90'; Parks (yellow card) 89' | Report | Héber 37' (o.g.); Lasso (yellow card) 71'; Ibeagha 76' (o.g.); Deplagne (yellow card) 83'; Hagglund (yellow card) 88'; Hoyte (yellow card) 90+4' | Stadium: Yankee Stadium; Attendance: 18,597; Referee: Allen Chapman |

| June 22, 2019 17 | FC Cincinnati | 0–2 | LA Galaxy | Cincinnati, Ohio |
| 7:30 p.m. EDT | Bertone (yellow card) 61'; Hagglund (yellow card) 79' | Report | Boateng 12', (yellow card) 80'; Álvarez 15'; Araujo (yellow card) 57' | Stadium: Nippert Stadium; Attendance: 32,250; Referee: Marcos de Oliveira |

| June 29, 2019 18 | Minnesota United FC | 7–1 | FC Cincinnati | Saint Paul, Minnesota |
| 4:00 p.m. EDT | Opara 18', 70'; Dotson 23'; Finlay 30', (yellow card) 79'; Rodríguez 43', (yellow card) 59'; Ibarra (yellow card) 54'; Toye 75'; Molino 87' | Report | Ledesma 59'; Hoyte (yellow card) 54' | Stadium: Allianz Field; Attendance: 19,778; Referee: Joseph Dickerson |

| July 6, 2019 19 | FC Cincinnati | 3–2 | Houston Dynamo | Cincinnati, Ohio |
| 7:30 p.m. EDT | Manneh 29'; Dally 38'; Amaya (yellow card) 32'; Ulloa 61' | Report | Elis (yellow card) 19'; Cabezas (yellow card) 25'; Quioto 79' (pen.); Hagglund 81' (o.g.) | Stadium: Nippert Stadium; Attendance: 26,276; Referee: David Gantar |

| July 13, 2019 20 | Chicago Fire SC | 1–2 | FC Cincinnati | Bridgeview, Illinois |
| 8:00 p.m. EDT | Gaitán 45+4'; Corrales (yellow card) 73'; Mihailovic (yellow card) 78' | Report | Cruz 1'; Richey (yellow card) 48'; Ledesma (yellow card) 52'; Bertone (yellow card) 59'; Adi 83' | Stadium: SeatGeek Stadium; Attendance: 13,127; Referee: Fotis Bazakos |

| July 18, 2019 21 | FC Cincinnati | 1–4 | D.C. United | Cincinnati, Ohio |
| 8:00 p.m. EDT | Waston (yellow card) 15'; Ledesma 54' (pen.); Bertone (yellow card) 61' | Report | Birnbaum (yellow card) 32'; Rodríguez 42', 59'; Rooney (yellow card) 54', (goal) 64'; Canouse (yellow card) 70'; Arriola (yellow card) 54', (goal) 73' | Stadium: Nippert Stadium; Attendance: 28,774; Referee: Baldomero Toledo |

| July 21, 2019 22 | FC Cincinnati | 0–2 | New England Revolution | Cincinnati, Ohio |
| 6:00 p.m. EDT | Cruz (yellow card) 54' | Report | Gil 9'; Delamea 55' | Stadium: Nippert Stadium; Attendance: 25,095; Referee: Kevin Stott |

| July 27, 2019 23 | Toronto FC | 2–1 | FC Cincinnati | Toronto, Canada |
| 8:00 p.m. EDT | DeLeon 16'; Altidore 50'; Moor (yellow card) 90+4' | Report | Deplagne (yellow card) 43'; Cruz (yellow card) 57'; Ledesma 58'; Waston (yellow card) 62'; Ulloa (yellow card) 87' | Stadium: BMO Field; Attendance: 25,765; Referee: Marcos de Oliveira |

| August 3, 2019 24 | FC Cincinnati | 1–2 | Vancouver Whitecaps FC | Cincinnati, Ohio |
| 8:00 p.m. EDT | Cruz 6'; Bertone (yellow card) 90+2' | Report | Hwang In-beom 41'; Martins 84' | Stadium: Nippert Stadium; Attendance: 27,106; Referee: Rosendo Mendoza |

| August 10, 2019 25 Hell Is Real Derby | Columbus Crew SC | 2–2 | FC Cincinnati | Columbus, Ohio |
| 7:30 p.m. EDT | Crognale (yellow card) 18'; Zardes 45' (pen.); Santos 62', (yellow card) 68' | Report | Mattocks 16'; Ledesma 23' van der Werff (yellow card) 72'; Cruz (yellow card) 90+4'; Ulloa (yellow card) 90+7' | Stadium: Mapfre Stadium; Attendance: 20,865; Referee: Silviu Petrescu |

| August 17, 2019 26 | FC Cincinnati | 1–4 | New York City FC | Cincinnati, Ohio |
| 7:30 p.m. EDT | Cruz (yellow card) 26', (goal) 30' | Report | Miller (yellow card) 23'; Castellanos 32', 71'; Héber 45+3', 89' | Stadium: Nippert Stadium; Attendance: 27,273; Referee: Nima Saghafi |

| August 25, 2019 27 Hell Is Real Derby | FC Cincinnati | 1–3 | Columbus Crew SC | Cincinnati, Ohio |
| 8:00 p.m. EDT | Gutman (yellow card) 23' van der Werff (yellow card) 31'; Deplagne (yellow card) 57'; Manneh 89'; Ulloa (yellow card) 90+1'; Ledesma (yellow card) 90+5' | Report | Zardes 22', 33'; Maloney (yellow card) 31'; Afful (yellow card) 43'; Díaz 45+1'; Artur (yellow card) 62'; Mensah (yellow card) 90+1' | Stadium: Nippert Stadium; Attendance: 30,611; Referee: Timothy Ford |

| August 31, 2019 28 | FC Dallas | 3–1 | FC Cincinnati | Frisco, Texas |
| 8:00 p.m. EDT | Hollingshead 12'; Hedges (yellow card) 37'; Barrios 49'; Ondrášek 51'; Badji (yellow card) 60'; Cannon (yellow card) 62'; Acosta (yellow card) 85' | Report | Ledesma 64' (pen.), (yellow card) 73'; Gutman (yellow card) 65'; Manneh (red card) 75' | Stadium: Toyota Stadium; Attendance: 15,811; Referee: Guido Gonzales Jr. |

| September 7, 2019 29 | FC Cincinnati | 1–5 | Toronto FC | Cincinnati, Ohio |
| 7:30 p.m. EDT | Alashe (yellow card) 81'; Ledesma 90+2' (pen.) | Report | Mullins 10'; DeLeon 21'; Bradley (yellow card) 23', (goal) 63'; Delgado 28'; Zavaleta (yellow card) 72' (yellow-red card) 88'; Benezet 85' | Stadium: Nippert Stadium; Attendance: 25,339; Referee: Allen Chapman |

| September 14, 2019 30 | Montreal Impact | 0–1 | FC Cincinnati | Montreal, Canada |
| 7:30 p.m. EDT | Lovitz (yellow card) 44'; Okwonkwo (yellow card) 49'; Camacho (yellow card) 68' | Report | Cruz 1'; Waston (yellow card) 60' (yellow-red card) 88' | Stadium: Saputo Stadium; Attendance: 17,159; Referee: Ramy Touchan |

| September 18, 2019 31 | FC Cincinnati | 0–2 | Atlanta United FC | Cincinnati, Ohio |
| 7:30 p.m. EDT | Stanko (yellow card) 90+4' | Report | Meram (yellow card) 14'; Escobar (yellow card) 49'; Martínez 59', 65'; Pírez (yellow card) 66' | Stadium: Nippert Stadium; Attendance: 24,774; Referee: Marcos de Oliveira |

| September 21, 2019 32 | FC Cincinnati | 0–0 | Chicago Fire SC | Cincinnati, Ohio |
| 7:30 p.m. EDT | Waston (yellow card) 20' | Report | Sapong (yellow card) 25'; McCarty (yellow card) 30' | Stadium: Nippert Stadium; Attendance: 26,466; Referee: Baldomero Toledo |

| September 29, 2019 33 | FC Cincinnati | 1–1 | Orlando City SC | Cincinnati, Ohio |
| 5:00 p.m. EDT | Cruz 40', (yellow card) 45+3' | Report | Méndez (yellow card) 45'; Jansson (yellow card) 61'; Smith (yellow card) 89'; Michel 90+1' | Stadium: Nippert Stadium; Attendance: 25,652; Referee: Robert Sibiga |

| October 6, 2019 34 | D.C. United | 0–0 | FC Cincinnati | Washington, D.C. |
| 4:00 p.m. EDT | Mora (yellow card) 38' | Report | Deplagne (yellow card) 14'; Bertone (yellow card) 30'; Gyau (red card) 41'; Lamah (red card) 44'; Stanko (yellow card) 85' | Stadium: Audi Field; Attendance: 18,732; Referee: David Gantar |

== Statistics ==
=== Appearances and goals ===
Numbers after plus-sign(+) denote appearances as a substitute.

| No. | Pos | Nat | Player | Total | | MLS | | MLS Cup Playoffs | | U.S. Open Cup | |
| No. | Pos | Nat | Player | Apps | Goals | Apps | Goals | Apps | Goals | Apps | Goals |
Goalkeepers
| 18 | GK | (United States) USA | Spencer Richey | 19 | 0 | 19 | 0 | 0 | 0 | 0 | 0 |
| 22 | GK | (Poland) POL | Przemysław Tytoń | 17 | 0 | 15 | 0 | 0 | 0 | 2 | 0 |
Defenders
| 2 | DF | (Costa Rica) CRC | Kendall Waston | 25 | 1 | 24+1 | 1 | 0 | 0 | 0 | 0 |
| 4 | DF | (United States) USA | Greg Garza | 13 | 0 | 11+2 | 0 | 0 | 0 | 0 | 0 |
| 14 | DF | (United States) USA | Nick Hagglund | 24 | 0 | 20+2 | 0 | 0 | 0 | 2 | 0 |
| 17 | DF | (France) FRA | Mathieu Deplagne | 35 | 1 | 33 | 1 | 0 | 0 | 2 | 0 |
| 23 | DF | (Netherlands) NED | Maikel van der Werff | 11 | 0 | 11 | 0 | 0 | 0 | 0 | 0 |
| 32 | DF | (Trinidad and Tobago) TRI | Justin Hoyte | 18 | 0 | 16+1 | 0 | 0 | 0 | 1 | 0 |
| 92 | DF | (Jamaica) JAM | Alvas Powell | 13 | 0 | 10+3 | 0 | 0 | 0 | 0 | 0 |
| 96 | DF | (United States) USA | Andrew Gutman | 8 | 0 | 5+3 | 0 | 0 | 0 | 0 | 0 |
Midfielders
| 6 | MF | (Switzerland) SUI | Leonardo Bertone | 26 | 1 | 22+3 | 1 | 0 | 0 | 0+1 | 0 |
| 7 | MF | (Belgium) BEL | Roland Lamah | 28 | 1 | 22+6 | 1 | 0 | 0 | 0 | 0 |
| 8 | MF | (Mexico) MEX | Víctor Ulloa | 28 | 1 | 22+4 | 1 | 0 | 0 | 2 | 0 |
| 15 | MF | (Costa Rica) CRC | Allan Cruz | 22 | 7 | 21+1 | 7 | 0 | 0 | 0 | 0 |
| 16 | MF | (United States) USA | Derrick Etienne | 5 | 0 | 2+3 | 0 | 0 | 0 | 0 | 0 |
| 19 | MF | (United States) USA | Corben Bone | 8 | 0 | 2+4 | 0 | 0 | 0 | 1+1 | 0 |
| 24 | MF | (United States) USA | Frankie Amaya | 21 | 0 | 15+4 | 0 | 0 | 0 | 1+1 | 0 |
| 26 | MF | (United States) USA | Tommy McCabe | 6 | 0 | 2+4 | 0 | 0 | 0 | 0 | 0 |
| 27 | MF | (United States) USA | Fatai Alashe | 11 | 3 | 4+7 | 1 | 0 | 1+1 | 0 | 0 |
| 33 | MF | (United States) USA | Caleb Stanko | 25 | 0 | 16+7 | 0 | 0 | 0 | 2 | 0 |
| 36 | MF | (United States) USA | Joseph-Claude Gyau | 8 | 0 | 5+3 | 0 | 0 | 0 | 0 | 0 |
| 45 | MF | (Argentina) ARG | Emmanuel Ledesma | 28 | 6 | 20+6 | 6 | 0 | 0 | 1+1 | 0 |
Forwards
| 9 | FW | (Nigeria) NGA | Fanendo Adi | 14 | 2 | 7+5 | 1 | 0 | 0 | 2 | 1 |
| 11 | FW | (Jamaica) JAM | Darren Mattocks | 21 | 3 | 13+8 | 3 | 0 | 0 | 0 | 0 |
| 31 | FW | (The Gambia) GAM | Kekuta Manneh | 29 | 5 | 15+12 | 4 | 0 | 0 | 2 | 1 |
| 81 | FW | (Jamaica) JAM | Rashawn Dally | 13 | 1 | 8+4 | 1 | 0 | 0 | 0+1 | 0 |
Left Club During Season
| 3 | DF | (United States) USA | Forrest Lasso | 7 | 0 | 4+1 | 0 | 0 | 0 | 2 | 0 |
| 5 | MF | (Palestine) PLE | Nazmi Albadawi | 1 | 0 | 0+1 | 0 | 0 | 0 | 0 | 0 |
| 16 | MF | (United States) USA | Eric Alexander | 8 | 0 | 4+2 | 0 | 0 | 0 | 1+1 | 0 |
| 93 | MF | (United States) USA | Kenny Saief | 9 | 1 | 6+3 | 1 | 0 | 0 | 0 | 0 |

- Last updated: October 7, 2019
- Source: Team Stats

=== Top scorers ===
| Rank | Position | Number | Name | MLS | MLS Playoffs | U.S. Open Cup | Total |
|---|---|---|---|---|---|---|---|
| 1 | MF | 15 | (Costa Rica) Allan Cruz | 7 | 0 | 0 | 7 |
| 2 | MF | 45 | (Argentina) Emmanuel Ledesma | 6 | 0 | 0 | 6 |
| 3 | FW | 31 | (The Gambia) Kekuta Manneh | 4 | 0 | 1 | 5 |
| 4 | FW | 11 | (Jamaica) Darren Mattocks | 3 | 0 | 0 | 3 |
| 5 | FW | 9 | (Nigeria) Fanendo Adi | 1 | 0 | 1 | 2 |
| 6 | DF | 2 | (Costa Rica) Kendall Waston | 1 | 0 | 0 | 1 |
| 6 | MF | 6 | (Switzerland) Leonardo Bertone | 1 | 0 | 0 | 1 |
| 6 | MF | 7 | (Belgium) Roland Lamah | 1 | 0 | 0 | 1 |
| 6 | DF | 17 | (France) Mathieu Deplagne | 1 | 0 | 0 | 1 |
| 6 | MF | 27 | (United States) Fatai Alashe | 1 | 0 | 0 | 1 |
| 6 | MF | 93 | (United States) Kenny Saief | 1 | 0 | 0 | 1 |
| 6 | FW | 81 | (Jamaica) Rashawn Dally | 1 | 0 | 0 | 1 |
| 6 | MF | 8 | (Mexico) Víctor Ulloa | 1 | 0 | 0 | 1 |
| Total | | | | 29 | 0 | 2 | 31 |

- Last updated: October 7, 2019
- Source: Team Stats

=== Top assists ===
| Rank | Position | Number | Name | MLS | MLS Playoffs | U.S. Open Cup | Total |
|---|---|---|---|---|---|---|---|
| 1 | MF | 45 | (Argentina) Emmanuel Ledesma | 4 | 0 | 1 | 5 |
| 2 | FW | 31 | (The Gambia) Kekuta Manneh | 3 | 0 | 0 | 3 |
| 2 | FW | 11 | (Jamaica) Darren Mattocks | 3 | 0 | 0 | 3 |
| 2 | FW | 7 | (Belgium) Roland Lamah | 3 | 0 | 0 | 3 |
| 3 | MF | 93 | (United States) Kenny Saief | 2 | 0 | 0 | 2 |
| 3 | MF | 6 | (Switzerland) Leonardo Bertone | 2 | 0 | 0 | 2 |
| 3 | MF | 8 | (Mexico) Víctor Ulloa | 2 | 0 | 0 | 2 |
| 3 | DF | 17 | (France) Mathieu Deplagne | 2 | 0 | 0 | 2 |
| 4 | MF | 19 | (United States) Eric Alexander | 1 | 0 | 0 | 1 |
| 4 | MF | 15 | (Costa Rica) Allan Cruz | 1 | 0 | 0 | 1 |
| 4 | DF | 96 | (United States) Andrew Gutman | 1 | 0 | 0 | 1 |
| 4 | 36 | MF | (United States) Joe Gyau | 1 | 0 | 0 | 1 |
| Total | | | | 25 | 0 | 1 | 26 |

- Last updated: October 7, 2019
- Source: Team Stats

=== Disciplinary record ===
| No. | Pos. | Player | MLS | | | MLS Playoffs | | | U.S. Open Cup | | | Total | | |
| No. | Pos. | Player | Booked | (yellow card) (yellow-red card) | Sent off (straight red) | Booked | (yellow card) (yellow-red card) | Sent off (straight red) | Booked | (yellow card) (yellow-red card) | Sent off (straight red) | Booked | (yellow card) (yellow-red card) | Sent off (straight red) |
| 6 | MF | (Switzerland) Leonardo Bertone | 9 | 0 | 0 | 0 | 0 | 0 | 0 | 0 | 0 | 9 | 0 | 0 |
| 2 | DF | (Costa Rica) Kendall Waston | 8 | 1 | 0 | 0 | 0 | 0 | 0 | 0 | 0 | 8 | 1 | 0 |
| 15 | MF | (Costa Rica) Allan Cruz | 5 | 0 | 0 | 0 | 0 | 0 | 0 | 0 | 0 | 5 | 0 | 0 |
| 8 | MF | (Mexico) Víctor Ulloa | 4 | 0 | 0 | 0 | 0 | 0 | 0 | 0 | 0 | 4 | 0 | 0 |
| 45 | MF | (Argentina) Emmanuel Ledesma | 4 | 0 | 0 | 0 | 0 | 0 | 0 | 0 | 0 | 4 | 0 | 0 |
| 17 | DF | (France) Mathieu Deplagne | 4 | 0 | 0 | 0 | 0 | 0 | 0 | 0 | 0 | 4 | 0 | 0 |
| 14 | DF | (United States) Nick Hagglund | 2 | 0 | 0 | 0 | 0 | 0 | 1 | 0 | 0 | 3 | 0 | 0 |
| 32 | DF | (Trinidad and Tobago) Justin Hoyte | 3 | 0 | 0 | 0 | 0 | 0 | 0 | 0 | 0 | 3 | 0 | 0 |
| 33 | MF | (United States) Caleb Stanko | 3 | 0 | 0 | 0 | 0 | 0 | 0 | 0 | 0 | 3 | 0 | 0 |
| 3 | DF | (United States) Forrest Lasso | 2 | 0 | 0 | 0 | 0 | 0 | 0 | 0 | 0 | 2 | 0 | 0 |
| 24 | MF | (United States) Frankie Amaya | 2 | 0 | 0 | 0 | 0 | 0 | 0 | 0 | 0 | 2 | 0 | 0 |
| 9 | FW | (Nigeria) Fanendo Adi | 1 | 0 | 0 | 0 | 0 | 0 | 1 | 0 | 0 | 2 | 0 | 0 |
| 23 | DF | (Netherlands) Maikel van der Werff | 2 | 0 | 0 | 0 | 0 | 0 | 0 | 0 | 0 | 2 | 0 | 0 |
| 96 | DF | (United States) Andrew Gutman | 2 | 0 | 0 | 0 | 0 | 0 | 0 | 0 | 0 | 2 | 0 | 0 |
| 27 | MF | (United States) Fatai Alashe | 2 | 0 | 0 | 0 | 0 | 0 | 0 | 0 | 0 | 2 | 0 | 0 |
| 4 | DF | (United States) Greg Garza | 1 | 0 | 0 | 0 | 0 | 0 | 0 | 0 | 0 | 1 | 0 | 0 |
| 18 | GK | (United States) Spencer Richey | 1 | 0 | 0 | 0 | 0 | 0 | 0 | 0 | 0 | 1 | 0 | 0 |
| 92 | DF | (Jamaica) Alvas Powell | 1 | 0 | 0 | 0 | 0 | 0 | 0 | 0 | 0 | 1 | 0 | 0 |
| 31 | FW | (The Gambia) Kekuta Manneh | 0 | 0 | 1 | 0 | 0 | 0 | 1 | 0 | 0 | 1 | 0 | 1 |
| 7 | MF | (Belgium) Roland Lamah | 0 | 0 | 1 | 0 | 0 | 0 | 0 | 0 | 0 | 0 | 0 | 1 |
| 36 | MF | (United States) Joe Gyau | 0 | 0 | 1 | 0 | 0 | 0 | 0 | 0 | 0 | 0 | 0 | 1 |
| Total | | | 56 | 1 | 3 | 0 | 0 | 0 | 3 | 0 | 0 | 59 | 1 | 3 |

- Last updated: October 7, 2019
- Source: Team Stats

=== Clean sheets ===
| No. | Name | MLS | U.S. Open Cup | Total | Games played |
|---|---|---|---|---|---|
| 18 | (United States) Spencer Richey | 2 | 0 | 2 | 19 |
| 22 | (Poland) Przemysław Tytoń | 3 | 0 | 3 | 17 |

- Last updated: October 7, 2019
- Source: Team Stats

== Honors and awards ==
=== MLS Team of the Week ===
| Week | Player | Opponent | Position | Ref |
|---|---|---|---|---|
| 2 | (United States) Nick Hagglund | Atlanta United FC | DF | |
| 2 | (United States) Kenny Saief | Atlanta United FC | Bench | |
| 3 | (United States) Spencer Richey | Portland Timbers | GK | |
| 3 | (Costa Rica) Kendall Waston | Portland Timbers | Bench | |
| 3 | (Mexico) Víctor Ulloa | Portland Timbers | Bench | |
| 4 | (United States) Kenny Saief (2) | New England Revolution | MF | |
| 4 | (The Gambia) Kekuta Manneh | New England Revolution | FW | |
| 4 | (United States) Greg Garza | New England Revolution | Bench | |
| 6 | (Jamaica) Darren Mattocks | Sporting Kansas City | Bench | |
| 11 | (Mexico) Víctor Ulloa (2) | Montreal Impact | MF | |
| 18 | (Argentina) Emmanuel Ledesma | Houston Dynamo | MF | |
| 19 | (Costa Rica) Kendall Waston (2) | Chicago Fire | DF | |
| 23 | (Poland) Przemysław Tytoń | Columbus Crew | GK | |
| 28 | (Costa Rica) Allan Cruz | Montreal Impact | Bench | |
| 31 | (Poland) Przemysław Tytoń (2) | D.C. United | GK | |

=== MLS Goal of the Week ===
| Week | Player | Opponent | Ref |
|---|---|---|---|
| 3 | (Costa Rica) Allan Cruz | Portland Timbers | |
| 4 | (The Gambia) Kekuta Manneh | New England Revolution | |

=== MLS Coach of the Week ===
| Week | Coach | Opponent | Ref |
|---|---|---|---|
| 3 | (South Africa) Alan Koch | Portland Timbers | |
| 4 | (South Africa) Alan Koch | New England Revolution | |
