= 2020 FC Cincinnati season =

Season of American association football team

FC Cincinnati
2020 season
- General manager: Gerard Nijkamp
- Head coach: Jaap Stam
- Stadium: Nippert Stadium
- MLS: Conference: 12th Overall: 26th
- MLS Cup Playoffs: Did not qualify
- U.S. Open Cup: Cancelled
- MLS is Back Tournament: Round of 16
- Biggest win: 2–0 (July 22 vs. RBNY)
- Biggest defeat: 0–4 (July 11 vs. Columbus) (Sep 26 vs. NYCFC)
Home colors	Away colors

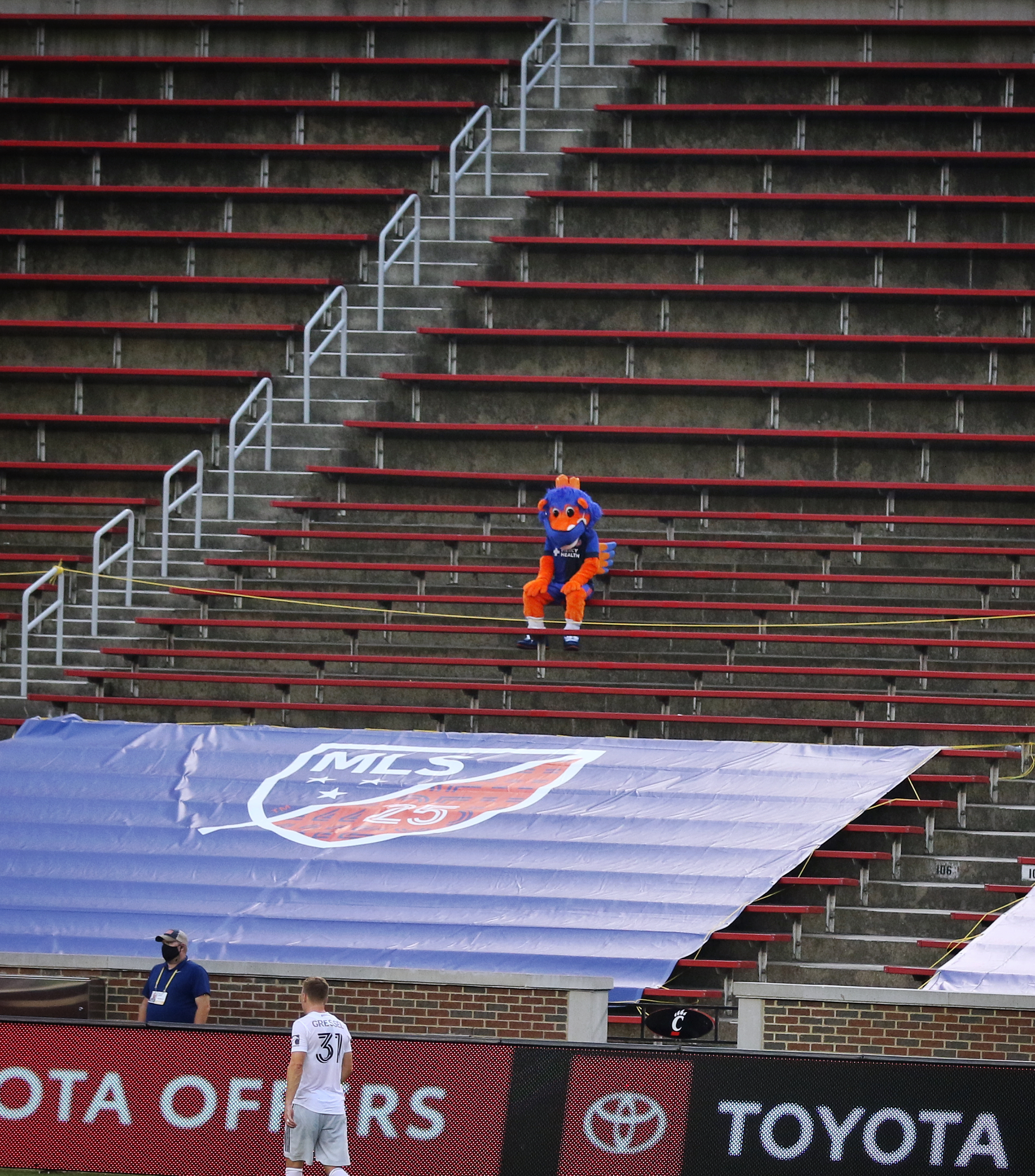
No fans were allowed to attend matches at Nippert Stadium due to the COVID-19 pandemic.

The 2020 FC Cincinnati season was the club's second season in MLS, and the fifth season of a team playing under the FC Cincinnati brand after three years in the lower-division USL Championship. The club finished with a league worst 6–22–6 record in their inaugural MLS season in 2019, setting a league record for the most goals given up with 75. The 2020 season was the final year that FC Cincinnati played home matches at Nippert Stadium, as their new West End Stadium is scheduled to open in March 2021.

FC Cincinnati's offseason transfers and preseason training were executed under head coach Ron Jans. However, Jans resigned on February 17, amidst an investigation into his alleged use of a racial slur. Assistant coach Yoann Damet took over as interim head coach two weeks before FC Cincinnati's first regular season match. On May 21, 2020, Jaap Stam was named head coach—the fourth in the team's history. Said Bakkati, who had worked on Stam's staff in the past, was also named new assistant coach.

Due to the COVID-19 pandemic, MLS suspended play after two weeks in March and resumed with the MLS is Back Tournament four months later. The tournament was played within a bio-secure bubble near Orlando, Florida, and was followed by the resumption of the regular season with a modified schedule to reduce travel. FC Cincinnati played all of their home matches behind closed doors with no public spectators in attendance.

== Club ==
=== Roster ===
As of November 9, 2020

No.	Name	Nationality	Position	Date of birth (age)	Previous club
1	Bobby Edwards	United States	GK	August 11, 1995 (age 31)	(Northern Ireland) Portadown FC
18	Spencer Richey	United States	GK	May 30, 1992 (age 34)	(Canada) Vancouver Whitecaps FC
22	Przemysław Tytoń (INTL)	Poland	GK	January 4, 1987 (age 39)	(Spain) Deportivo La Coruña
30	Beckham Sunderland (HG)	United States	GK	June 30, 2003 (age 23)	(United States) FC Cincinnati Academy
2	Kendall Waston (C)	Costa Rica	DF	January 1, 1988 (age 38)	(Canada) Vancouver Whitecaps FC
3	Tom Pettersson (INTL)	Sweden	DF	March 25, 1990 (age 36)	(Sweden) Östersunds FK
4	Greg Garza	United States	DF	August 16, 1991 (age 35)	(United States) Atlanta United FC
12	Saad Abdul-Salaam	United States	DF	September 8, 1991 (age 35)	(United States) Seattle Sounders FC
14	Nick Hagglund	United States	DF	September 14, 1992 (age 34)	(Canada) Toronto FC
16	Zico Bailey (HG)	United States	DF	August 27, 2000 (age 26)	(Denmark) FC Helsingør
17	Mathieu Deplagne (INTL)	France	DF	October 1, 1991 (age 34)	(France) Troyes AC
23	Maikel van der Werff (INTL)	Netherlands	DF	April 22, 1989 (age 37)	(Netherlands) SBV Vitesse
47	Hassan Ndam	Cameroon	DF	October 29, 1998 (age 27)	(United States) Miami FC
96	Andrew Gutman (HG)	United States	DF	October 2, 1996 (age 29)	(Scotland) Celtic FC
6	Haris Medunjanin (INTL)	Bosnia and Herzegovina	MF	March 8, 1985 (age 41)	(United States) Philadelphia Union
8	Allan Cruz (DP)	Costa Rica	MF	February 24, 1996 (age 30)	(Costa Rica) C.S. Herediano
11	Siem de Jong (INTL)	Netherlands	MF	January 28, 1989 (age 37)	(Netherlands) Ajax
15	Kamohelo Mokotjo (INTL)	South Africa	MF	March 11, 1991 (age 35)	(England) Brentford F.C.
24	Frankie Amaya (GA)	United States	MF	September 26, 2000 (age 25)	(United States) UCLA Bruins
26	Tommy McCabe	United States	MF	April 4, 1998 (age 28)	(United States) Notre Dame Fighting Irish
33	Caleb Stanko	United States	MF	July 26, 1993 (age 33)	(Germany) SC Freiburg
7	Yuya Kubo (DP, INTL)	Japan	MF/FW	December 23, 1993 (age 32)	(Belgium) K.A.A. Gent
20	Jimmy McLaughlin	United States	MF/FW	April 30, 1993 (age 33)	(United States) FC Cincinnati (USL)
31	Álvaro Barreal (INTL)	Argentina	MF/FW	August 17, 2000 (age 26)	(Argentina) Club Atlético Vélez Sarsfield
36	Joe Gyau	United States	MF/FW	September 16, 1992 (age 34)	(Germany) MSV Duisburg
10	Jürgen Locadia (DP, INTL)	Netherlands	FW	November 7, 1993 (age 32)	(England) Brighton & Hove Albion
19	Brandon Vazquez	United States	FW	October 14, 1998 (age 27)	(United States) Atlanta United FC
21	Franko Kovačević (INTL)	Croatia	FW	August 8, 1999 (age 27)	(Germany) TSG 1899 Hoffenheim II
81	Rashawn Dally	Jamaica	FW	January 14, 1997 (age 29)	(United States) Las Vegas Lights FC

=== 2020 MLS SuperDraft picks ===
Round	Pick #	Player	Position	College	Notes
2	29	(Mexico) Rey Ortiz	Forward	Portland	
3	53	(Benin) Joris Ahlinvi	Midfielder	Indiana	From Inter Miami FC, did not sign

== Player movement ==
=== In ===
Number	Position	Player	Transferred from	Fee/notes	Date	Ref
19	FW	(United States) Brandon Vazquez	(United States) Nashville SC	$150K in TAM	November 20, 2019	
6	MF	(Bosnia and Herzegovina) Haris Medunjanin	(United States) Philadelphia Union	Selected #1 in 2019 MLS Waiver Draft	November 25, 2019	
12	DF	(United States) Saad Abdul-Salaam	(United States) Seattle Sounders FC	Selected #1 in Stage 2 of 2019 MLS Re-Entry Draft	December 3, 2019	
16	DF	(United States) Zico Bailey	(United States) LA Galaxy	Fourth-round 2020 MLS SuperDraft pick	December 12, 2019	
3	DF	(Sweden) Tom Pettersson	(Sweden) Östersunds FK	Free transfer	December 17, 2019	
7	FW	(Japan) Yuya Kubo	(Belgium) K.A.A. Gent	Transfer	January 9, 2020	
1	GK	(United States) Bobby Edwards	(Northern Ireland) Portadown FC	Free transfer	January 20, 2020	
9	MF	(Morocco) Adrien Regattin	(Turkey) Akhisar Belediyespor	Free transfer	February 5, 2020	
11	MF	(Netherlands) Siem de Jong	(Netherlands) Ajax	Free transfer	February 20, 2020	
15	MF	(South Africa) Kamohelo Mokotjo	(England) Brentford FC	Free transfer	August 20, 2020	
31	MF/FW	(Argentina) Álvaro Barreal	(Argentina) Club Atlético Vélez Sarsfield	Transfer	September 2, 2020	

=== Out ===
Date	Number	Position	Player	Transferred to	Fee/notes	Ref
October 9, 2019	7	MF	(Belgium) Roland Lamah		Option declined	
October 9, 2019	19	MF	(United States) Corben Bone	(United States) Louisville City FC	Option declined	
October 9, 2019	32	DF	(Trinidad and Tobago) Justin Hoyte		Option declined	
October 9, 2019	5	MF	(Palestine) Nazmi Albadawi	(United States) North Carolina FC	Option declined	
November 11, 2019	8	MF	(Mexico) Víctor Ulloa	(United States) Inter Miami CF	$50K in GAM, a 2020 SuperDraft third-round selection, 26th pick of the 2019 Re-Entry Draft (Stage 1)	
November 14, 2019	3	DF	(United States) Forrest Lasso	(United States) Tampa Bay Rowdies	Option declined	
November 14, 2019	16	MF	(Haiti) Derrick Etienne Jr.	(United States) Columbus Crew	Option declined	
November 19, 2019	92	DF	(Jamaica) Alvas Powell	(United States) Inter Miami CF	Selected #3 in 2019 MLS Expansion Draft, $50K in GAM	
January 13, 2020	6	MF	(Switzerland) Leonardo Bertone	(Switzerland) FC Thun	Undisclosed	
January 18, 2020	9	FW	(Nigeria) Fanendo Adi	(United States) Columbus Crew	Waived	
January 18, 2020	13	GK	(United States) Jimmy Hague	(United States) Memphis 901 FC	Waived	
January 18, 2020	45	MF	(Argentina) Emmanuel Ledesma	(Finland) SJK	Waived	
January 29, 2020	21	DF	(United States) Logan Gdula	(United States) Charleston Battery	Waived	
August 17, 2020	31	FW	(The Gambia) Kekuta Manneh	(United States) New England Revolution	Trade; received international roster slot	
August 17, 2020	27	MF	(United States) Fatai Alashe	(United States) Columbus Crew	Trade; acquired 2021 MLS SuperDraft second-round selection	
September 11, 2020	9	FW	(Morocco) Adrien Regattin	(Turkey) Altay	Mutually agreed to part ways	

=== Loans in ===
Number	Position	Player	Loaned from	Loan start date	Loan end date	Ref
10	FW	(Netherlands) Jürgen Locadia	(England) Brighton & Hove Albion	February 3, 2020	July 30, 2021	
21	FW	(Croatia) Franko Kovačević	(Germany) TSG 1899 Hoffenheim II	October 12, 2020	June 30, 2021	

=== Loans out ===
Number	Position	Player	Loaned to	Loan start date	Loan end date	Ref
39	GK	(Germany) Ben Lundt	(United States) Louisville City FC	January 21, 2020	November 30, 2020	
47	DF	(Cameroon) Hassan Ndam	(United States) Miami FC	February 1, 2020	End of season	
25	MF	(Mexico) Rey Ortiz	(United States) Charlotte Independence	February 28, 2020	November 30, 2020	
81	FW	(Jamaica) Rashawn Dally	(United States) Las Vegas Lights FC	July 2, 2020	End of season	
16	MF	(United States) Tommy McCabe	(United States) Memphis 901 FC	August 28, 2020	End of season	

== Competitions ==
Win Draw Loss

=== Preseason ===
January 29, 2020 Preseason	Phoenix Rising FC	0–3	FC Cincinnati	Tucson, Arizona
5:00 p.m. EDT		Report	McCabe 22' (Ortiz); Gutman 42' (Ortiz); Gyau 53'	Stadium: Kino Sports Complex

February 1, 2020 Preseason	FC Cincinnati	0–4	Sporting Kansas City	Casa Grande, Arizona
1:00 p.m. EDT	Gyau (yellow card) 55'; Stanko (yellow card) 62'	Report	Sallói 11' (Lindsey), (yellow card) 27'; Espinoza 44'; Harris 65'; Busio (yellow card) 80'; Russell 82' (Harris)	Stadium: Grande Sports World

February 5, 2020 Preseason	FC Cincinnati	1–0	El Paso Locomotive FC	Tucson, Arizona
5:00 p.m. EDT	Alashe 81'	Report	Makinde (yellow card) 24'; Zola (yellow card) 71'	Stadium: Kino Sports Complex

February 12, 2020 Preseason	FC Cincinnati	1–0	Philadelphia Union	Bradenton, Florida
4:00 p.m. EDT		Report; Report		Stadium: IMG Soccer Complex

February 16, 2020 Preseason	FC Cincinnati	1–3	Nashville SC	Bradenton, Florida
6:00 p.m. EDT	Amaya 61'	Report	Maher 20'; Ríos 64'; Jones 83' (pen.)	Stadium: IMG Soccer Complex

February 21, 2020 Preseason	FC Cincinnati	3–3	KR Reykjavik	Bradenton, Florida
12:00 p.m. EDT	Cruz 12', 55'; McLaughlin 28'	Report		Stadium: IMG Soccer Complex

=== Major League Soccer ===
==== League tables ====
===== Eastern Conference =====
Pos	Team	Pld	W	L	T	GF	GA	GD	Pts	PPG	Qualification
10	Inter Miami CF	23	7	13	3	25	35	−10	24	1.04	Qualification for the playoffs play-in round
11	Chicago Fire FC	23	5	10	8	33	39	−6	23	1.00	
12	Atlanta United FC	23	6	13	4	23	30	−7	22	0.96	Qualification for the 2021 CONCACAF Champions League (Note: As 2019 U.S. Open Cup champions)
13	D.C. United	23	5	12	6	25	41	−16	21	0.91	
14	FC Cincinnati	23	4	15	4	12	36	−24	16	0.70	

Source: MLS
Rules for classification: 1) points per game; 2) total wins per match played; 3) total goal differential per match played; 4) total goals scored per match played; 5) fewest disciplinary points per match played; 6) away goal differential per away match played; 7) away goals scored per away match played; 8) home goal differential per home match played; 9) home goals scored per home match played; 10) coin toss or drawing of lots.

===== MLS is Back – Group E =====
Group E results
Pos	Team	Pld	W	D	L	GF	GA	GD	Pts	Qualification
1	Columbus Crew SC	3	3	0	0	7	0	+7	9	Advanced to knockout stage
2	FC Cincinnati	3	2	0	1	3	4	−1	6	Advanced to knockout stage
3	New York Red Bulls	3	1	0	2	1	4	−3	3	
4	Atlanta United	3	0	0	3	0	3	−3	0	

Source: MLS

===== Overall =====
2020 MLS overall standings
Pos	Team	Pld	W	L	T	GF	GA	GD	Pts	PPG	Qualification
22	Chicago Fire FC	23	5	10	8	33	39	−6	23	1.00	
23	Atlanta United FC (U)	23	6	13	4	23	30	−7	22	0.96	2021 CONCACAF Champions League (Note: As 2019 U.S. Open Cup champions (USA4))
24	D.C. United	23	5	12	6	25	41	−16	21	0.91	
25	Houston Dynamo	23	4	10	9	30	40	−10	21	0.91	
26	FC Cincinnati	23	4	15	4	12	36	−24	16	0.70	

Source: MLS
Rules for classification: 1) points per game; 2) total wins per match played; 3) total goal differential per match played; 4) total goals scored per match played; 5) fewest disciplinary points per match played; 6) away goal differential per away match played; 7) away goals scored per away match played; 8) home goal differential per home match played; 9) home goals scored per home match played; 10) coin toss or drawing of lots.
(U) U.S. Open Cup winners

==== Results ====
Matchday	1	2	3	4	5	6	7	8	9	10	11	12	13	14	15	16	17	18	19	20	21	22	23
Stadium	A	A	N	N	N	H	A	H	H	A	A	A	H	A	A	A	H	H	H	H	H	A	A
Result	L	L	L	W	W	D	L	D	D	L	L	W	D	L	L	L	L	W	L	L	L	L	L

W = Win; D = Draw; L = Loss

March 1, 2020 1	New York Red Bulls	3–2	FC Cincinnati	Harrison, New Jersey
1:00 p.m. EST	Duncan 16'; Kaku 27'; White (yellow card) 30'; Royer 70'; Cásseres (yellow card) 89'	Report	Cruz 46'; Locadia 83'	Stadium: Red Bull Arena; Attendance: 15,703; Referee: David Gantar

March 7, 2020 2	Atlanta United FC	2–1	FC Cincinnati	Atlanta, Georgia
7:00 p.m. EST	Barco 21'; Hyndman 55'; Rossetto (yellow card) 75'	Report	Waston (yellow card) 4'; Garza (yellow card) 34'; Amaya (yellow card) 53'; Kubo 64'; Cruz (yellow card) 89'	Stadium: Mercedes-Benz Stadium; Attendance: 69,301; Referee: Robert Sibiga

July 11, 2020 3 MLSiBT GS	FC Cincinnati	0–4	Columbus Crew SC	Bay Lake, Florida
10:30 p.m. EST	Amaya (yellow card) 44'; Alashe (yellow card) 82'	Report	Zelarayán 27'; Zardes 30', 49'; Mokhtar 60'; Mensah (yellow card) 82'	Stadium: ESPN Wide World of Sports Complex; Attendance: 0 (closed door); Referee: Ismail Elfath

July 16, 2020 4 MLSiBT GS	Atlanta United FC	0–1	FC Cincinnati	Bay Lake, Florida
9:00 a.m. EST	Mulraney (yellow card) 12' (yellow-red card) 26'; Barco (yellow card) 43'; Escobar (yellow card) 88'; Robinson (yellow card) 90+5'; Williams (red card) 90+10'	Report	Deplagne (yellow card) 48'; Amaya 76', (yellow card) 86'; Stanko (yellow card) 90+12'	Stadium: ESPN Wide World of Sports Complex; Attendance: 0 (closed door); Referee: Victor Rivas
Note: MLS is Back Tournament Group stage matches will count toward the MLS Regular Season Standings

July 22, 2020 5 MLSiBT GS	FC Cincinnati	2–0	New York Red Bulls	Bay Lake, Florida
8:00 p.m. EST	Deplagne (yellow card) 39'; Kubo 43'; Valot 57' (o.g.)	Report	Pendant (yellow card) 60'	Stadium: ESPN Wide World of Sports Complex; Attendance: 0 (closed door); Referee: Marcos de Oliveira

August 21, 2020 6	FC Cincinnati	0–0	D.C. United	Cincinnati, Ohio
7:30 p.m. EST	Deplagne (yellow card) 13'; Stanko (yellow card) 37'	Report	Canouse (yellow card) 35'; Flores (yellow card) 88'; Abu (yellow card) 90+1'	Stadium: Nippert Stadium; Attendance: 0 (closed door); Referee: Rubiel Vazquez

August 25, 2020 7	Chicago Fire FC	3–0	FC Cincinnati	Chicago, Illinois
7:30 p.m. EST	Herbers 2'; Medrán 10', (yellow card) 61'; Aliseda 67'	Report	Pettersson (yellow card) 36'; Amaya (yellow card) 63'	Stadium: Soldier Field; Referee: Elton García

August 29, 2020 8	FC Cincinnati	0–0	Columbus Crew SC	Cincinnati, Ohio
7:30 p.m. EST	van der Werff (yellow card) 4'; Gyau (yellow card) 11'; Kubo (yellow card) 89'	Report	Artur (yellow card) 43'; Williams (yellow card) 74'	Stadium: Nippert Stadium; Referee: Ted Unkel

September 2, 2020 9	FC Cincinnati	0–0	Chicago Fire FC	Cincinnati, Ohio
7:30 p.m. EST	Deplagne (yellow card) 90+6'	Report	Bornstein (yellow card) 90+7'	Stadium: Nippert Stadium; Referee: Marcos de Oliveira

September 6, 2020 10	Columbus Crew SC	3–0	FC Cincinnati	Columbus, Ohio
7:30 p.m. EST	Santos 52'; Zardes 64', 71', (yellow card) 82'	Report	Amaya (yellow card) 39' van der Werff (yellow card) 70'; Waston (yellow card) 90'	Stadium: Mapfre Stadium; Attendance: 1,500; Referee: Guido Gonzales, Jr.

September 12, 2020 11	New York City FC	2–1	FC Cincinnati	Harrison, New Jersey
7:00 p.m. EST	Ring 39'; Tinnerholm 55'; Sands (yellow card) 78'; Chanot (yellow card) 84'	Report	Waston (yellow card) 52'; Vázquez 74'; Deplagne (yellow card) 90+5'	Stadium: Red Bull Arena; Referee: Rubiel Vazquez

September 19, 2020 12	New York Red Bulls	0–1	FC Cincinnati	Harrison, New Jersey
7:00 p.m. EST	Long (yellow card) 8'; Nealis (yellow card) 22'; Cásseres Jr. (yellow card) 55'	Report	Medunjanin 85'; Stanko (yellow card) 90+2'	Stadium: Red Bull Arena; Referee: Robert Sibiga

September 23, 2020 13	FC Cincinnati	0–0	Philadelphia Union	Cincinnati, Ohio
7:30 p.m. EST	Gyau (yellow card) 19'; Waston (yellow card) 47'; Medunjanin (yellow card) 63'; Amaya (yellow card) 90+3'	Report	Bedoya (yellow card) 59'; Przybylko (yellow card) 79'	Stadium: Nippert Stadium; Referee: Guido Gonzales, Jr.

September 26, 2020 14	New York City FC	4–0	FC Cincinnati	Harrison, New Jersey
7:00 p.m. EST	Mitriță 1', 43'; Tinnerholm 25'; Callens (yellow card) 34'; Matarrita (yellow card) 61'; Castellanos (yellow card) 78'; Medina 88'	Report	Waston (yellow card) 64'; Medunjanin (yellow card) 71'	Stadium: Red Bull Arena; Referee: Armando Villarreal

October 3, 2020 15	Minnesota United FC	2–0	FC Cincinnati	Saint Paul, Minnesota
8:00 p.m. EST	Kamara 16' (pen.); Gasper (yellow card) 50'; Molino 69'; Lod (yellow card) 76'	Report	Deplagne (yellow card) 15'; Cruz (yellow card) 47'	Stadium: Allianz Field; Referee: Marcos de Oliveira

October 7, 2020 16	Philadelphia Union	3–0	FC Cincinnati	Chester, Pennsylvania
7:30 p.m. EST	Bedoya (yellow card) 40', (goal) 73'; Ilsinho 59'; McKenzie (yellow card) 66'; Elliott 80'; Mbaizo (yellow card) 90+3'	Report		Stadium: Subaru Park; Referee: Jon Freemon

October 11, 2020 17	FC Cincinnati	0–1	Toronto FC	Cincinnati, Ohio
7:30 p.m. EST	Gutman (yellow card) 66'; Hagglund (yellow card) 67'	Report	Gonzalez (yellow card) 9'; Osorio (yellow card) 21'; Mullins 29'; Ciman (yellow card) 72'	Stadium: Nippert Stadium; Referee: Robert Sibiga

October 14, 2020 18	FC Cincinnati	2–1	Columbus Crew SC	Cincinnati, Ohio
7:30 p.m. EST	Gutman (yellow card) 7'; Kubo 17' (pen.); Hagglund 49'	Report	Alashe (yellow card) 31'; Mensah (yellow card) 37'; Santos 45' (pen.); Boateng (yellow card) 45+2'; Morris (yellow card) 90+3'	Stadium: Nippert Stadium; Referee: Rubiel Vazquez

October 18, 2020 19	FC Cincinnati	1–2	D.C. United	Cincinnati, Ohio
7:30 p.m. EST	Vázquez 66'	Report	Asad (yellow card) 27'; Nyeman (yellow card) 32'; Pines 36'; Odoi-Atsem 78', (yellow card) 90+3'	Stadium: Nippert Stadium; Referee: Rosendo Mendoza

October 24, 2020 20	FC Cincinnati	0–1	Minnesota United FC	Cincinnati, Ohio
7:30 p.m. EST	Bailey (yellow card) 81'	Report	Alonso (yellow card) 66'; Gasper (yellow card) 82'; Schoenfeld 90+2'	Stadium: Nippert Stadium; Referee: Malik Badawi

October 28, 2020 21	FC Cincinnati	0–1	Sporting Kansas City	Cincinnati, Ohio
7:30 p.m. EST	de Jong (penalty missed) 63'	Report	Espinoza 57'; Punčec (yellow card) 60'	Stadium: Nippert Stadium; Referee: David Gantar

November 1, 2020 22	Atlanta United FC	2–0	FC Cincinnati	Atlanta, Georgia
7:00 PM EST	Jahn 8', (yellow card) 22'; Moreno 26' (pen.)	Report	Amaya (yellow card) 45+3'; Gutman (yellow card) 90+3'	Stadium: Mercedes-Benz Stadium; Referee: Alan Kelly

November 8, 2020 23	Inter Miami CF	2–1	FC Cincinnati	Fort Lauderdale, Florida
3:30 p.m. EST	Ambrose 19'; Pirez 23'; Reyes (yellow card) 62' (yellow-red card) 88'	Report	Gyau (yellow card) 4', (goal) 66'; Hagglund (yellow card) 21'	Stadium: Inter Miami CF Stadium; Referee: Guido Gonzales Jr.

=== MLS is Back Tournament ===
July 28, 2020 Round of 16	Portland Timbers	1–1 (4–2 p)	FC Cincinnati	Orlando, Florida
19:30 PST	Blanco (yellow card) 18'; Villafaña (yellow card) 29'; Niezgoda 67'	Report	(yellow card) 30' Gutman; (yellow card) 46' Gyau; 81' (pen.) Locadia; (yellow card) 90' Alashe	Stadium: ESPN Wide World of Sports Complex; Attendance: closed match Referee: Armando Villarreal
	Penalties
	Valeri (penalty scored); Mora (penalty scored); Blanco (penalty scored); Niezgoda (penalty scored)		(penalty scored) de Jong; (penalty scored) Cruz; (penalty missed) Locadia; (penalty missed) Waston

=== U.S. Open Cup ===
Due to their final position in the 2019 MLS standings, FC Cincinnati would enter the competition in the Third Round, which was scheduled for April 19–21. However, the tournament was suspended and eventually cancelled on August 17, 2020, due to the COVID-19 pandemic.

== Statistics ==
=== Appearances and goals ===
Numbers after plus-sign(+) denote appearances as a substitute.

No.	Pos	Nat	Player	Total		MLS		Playoffs	
No.	Pos	Nat	Player	Apps	Goals	Apps	Goals	Apps	Goals
Goalkeepers
1	GK	(United States) USA	Bobby Edwards	2	0	2	0	0	0
18	GK	(United States) USA	Spencer Richey	10	0	9+1	0	0	0
22	GK	(Poland) POL	Przemysław Tytoń	12	0	12	0	0	0
Defenders
2	DF	(Costa Rica) CRC	Kendall Waston	17	0	17	0	0	0
3	DF	(Sweden) SWE	Tom Pettersson	15	0	13+2	0	0	0
4	DF	(United States) USA	Greg Garza	9	0	7+2	0	0	0
12	DF	(United States) USA	Saad Abdul-Salaam	8	0	5+3	0	0	0
14	DF	(United States) USA	Nick Hagglund	11	1	8+3	1	0	0
16	DF	(United States) USA	Zico Bailey	5	0	3+2	0	0	0
17	DF	(France) FRA	Mathieu Deplagne	15	0	13+2	0	0	0
23	DF	(Netherlands) NED	Maikel van der Werff	13	0	11+2	0	0	0
96	DF	(United States) USA	Andrew Gutman	21	0	15+6	0	0	0
Midfielders
6	MF	(Bosnia and Herzegovina) BIH	Haris Medunjanin	21	1	19+2	1	0	0
7	MF	(Japan) JPN	Yuya Kubo	19	3	15+4	3	0	0
8	MF	(Costa Rica) CRC	Allan Cruz	14	1	8+6	1	0	0
11	MF	(Netherlands) NED	Siem de Jong	15	0	8+7	0	0	0
15	MF	(South Africa) RSA	Kamohelo Mokotjo	9	0	6+3	0	0	0
20	MF	(United States) USA	Jimmy McLaughlin	1	0	0+1	0	0	0
24	MF	(United States) USA	Frankie Amaya	21	1	21	1	0	0
26	MF	(United States) USA	Tommy McCabe	1	0	0+1	0	0	0
31	MF	(Argentina) ARG	Álvaro Barreal	5	0	4+1	0	0	0
33	MF	(United States) USA	Caleb Stanko	13	0	5+8	0	0	0
36	MF	(United States) USA	Joe Gyau	21	1	20+1	1	0	0
Forwards
10	FW	(Netherlands) NED	Jürgen Locadia	17	1	15+2	1	0	0
19	FW	(United States) USA	Brandon Vazquez	19	2	8+11	2	0	0
21	FW	(Croatia) CRO	Franko Kovačević	1	0	1	0	0	0
81	FW	(Jamaica) JAM	Rashawn Dally	4	0	0+4	0	0	0
Players who have played for FC Cincinnati this season but have left the club:
9	MF	(Morocco) MAR	Adrien Regattin	10	0	7+3	0	0	0
27	MF	(United States) USA	Fatai Alashe	3	0	0+3	0	0	0
31	FW	(The Gambia) GAM	Kekuta Manneh	2	0	1+1	0	0	0

- Last updated: November 9, 2020
- Source: Team Stats

=== Top scorers ===
Rank	Position	No.	Name	MLS	Playoffs	Total
1	FW	7	(Japan) Yuya Kubo	3	0	3
2	FW	10	(Netherlands) Jürgen Locadia	2	0	2
2	FW	19	(United States) Brandon Vazquez	2	0	2
3	MF	6	(Bosnia and Herzegovina) Haris Medunjanin	1	0	1
3	MF	15	(Costa Rica) Allan Cruz	1	0	1
3	DF	14	(United States) Nick Hagglund	1	0	1
3	MF	24	(United States) Frankie Amaya	1	0	1
3	MF	36	(United States) Joe Gyau	1	0	1
Total				12	0	12

- Last updated: November 9, 2020
- Source: Team Stats

=== Top assists ===
Rank	Position	No.	Name	MLS	Playoffs	Total
1	FW	9	(Morocco) Adrien Regattin	2	0	2
1	FW	19	(United States) Brandon Vazquez	2	0	2
2	DF	4	(United States) Greg Garza	1	0	1
2	MF	6	(Bosnia and Herzegovina) Haris Medunjanin	1	0	1
Total				6	0	6

- Last updated: November 9, 2020
- Source: Team Stats

=== Disciplinary record ===
No.	Pos.	Player	MLS			Playoffs			Total		
No.	Pos.	Player	Booked	(yellow card) (yellow-red card)	Sent off (straight red)	Booked	(yellow card) (yellow-red card)	Sent off (straight red)	Booked	(yellow card) (yellow-red card)	Sent off (straight red)
24	MF	(United States) Frankie Amaya	7	0	0	0	0	0	7	0	0
17	DF	(France) Mathieu Deplagne	6	0	0	0	0	0	6	0	0
2	DF	(Costa Rica) Kendall Waston	5	0	0	0	0	0	5	0	0
36	MF	(United States) Joe Gyau	4	0	0	0	0	0	4	0	0
96	DF	(United States) Andrew Gutman	4	0	0	0	0	0	4	0	0
33	MF	(United States) Caleb Stanko	3	0	0	0	0	0	3	0	0
6	MF	(Bosnia and Herzegovina) Haris Medunjanin	2	0	0	0	0	0	2	0	0
8	MF	(Costa Rica) Allan Cruz	2	0	0	0	0	0	2	0	0
14	DF	(United States) Nick Hagglund	2	0	0	0	0	0	2	0	0
22	MF	(United States) Fatai Alashe	2	0	0	0	0	0	2	0	0
23	DF	(Netherlands) Maikel van der Werff	2	0	0	0	0	0	2	0	0
3	DF	(Sweden) Tom Pettersson	1	0	0	0	0	0	1	0	0
4	DF	(United States) Greg Garza	1	0	0	0	0	0	1	0	0
7	MF/FW	(Japan) Yuya Kubo	1	0	0	0	0	0	1	0	0
16	DF	(United States) Zico Bailey	1	0	0	0	0	0	1	0	0
Total			43	0	0	0	0	0	43	0	0

- Last updated: November 9, 2020
- Source: Team Stats

=== Clean sheets ===
No.	Name	MLS	Playoffs	Total	Games
22	(Poland) Przemysław Tytoń	5	0	5	13
18	(United States) Spencer Richey	2	0	2	10
1	(United States) Bobby Edwards	0	0	0	2

- Last updated: November 9, 2020
- Source: Team Stats

== Awards ==
=== MLS is Back Man of the Match ===
The Man of the Match is named after each match by the editorial team of MLSsoccer.com.

Man of the Match
Match	Player	Opponent	Ref.
16	(United States) Frankie Amaya	Atlanta United FC	
32	(Japan) Yuya Kubo	New York Red Bulls	
44	(Poland) Przemysław Tytoń	Portland Timbers	

=== MLS is Back Team of the Week ===
The Team of the Week includes the top players and coach during each week of the tournament, as chosen by the editorial team of MLSsoccer.com.

Week	Bench	Ref.
2	(United States) Frankie Amaya	
3	(Japan) Yuya Kubo	

=== MLS is Back Coach of the Week ===
The Coach of the Week during each week of the tournament, as chosen by the editorial team of MLSsoccer.com.

Week	Coach	Ref.
3	(Netherlands) Jaap Stam	

=== MLS is Back Goal of the Week ===
The Goal of the Week determines the best goal during each week of the tournament. The editorial team of MLSsoccer.com shortlists goals for fans to vote for on Twitter.

Week	Player	Scored against	Score	Date	Ref.
2	(United States) Frankie Amaya	Atlanta United FC	1–0 (76')	July 16, 2020	

=== MLS Team of the Week ===
Week	Player	Opponent	Position	Ref
8	(Netherlands) Maikel van der Werff	Columbus Crew SC	DF	
9	(Costa Rica) Kendall Waston	Chicago Fire FC	DF	
11	(Bosnia and Herzegovina) Haris Medunjanin	New York Red Bulls	MF	
11	(United States) Nick Hagglund	New York Red Bulls	DF	
18	(United States) Nick Hagglund	Columbus Crew SC	DF	
