= Allan Cruz =

Costa Rican football player (born 1996)

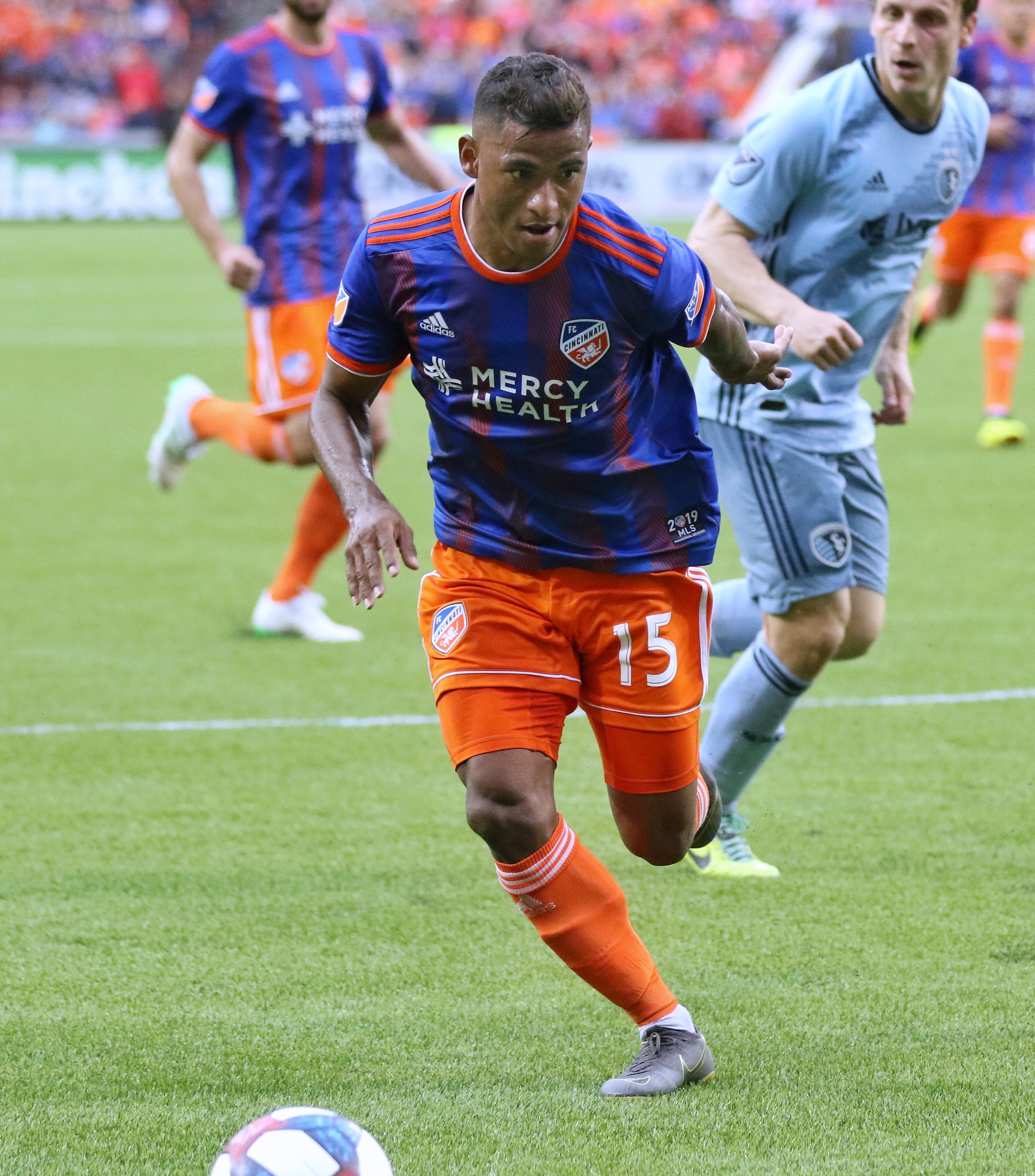
- Cruz with FC Cincinnati in 2019

Personal information
- Full name: Allan Enzo Cruz Leal
- Date of birth: 24 February 1996 (age 30)
- Place of birth: Nicoya, Costa Rica
- Height: 5 ft 5 in (1.64 m)
- Position: Midfielder

Team information
- Current team: Herediano
- Number: 8

Senior career*
Years	Team	Apps	(Gls)
2013–2016	Uruguay de Coronado	24	(1)
2014–2015	→ Generación Saprissa (loan)		
2017–2018	Herediano	65	(4)
2019–2022	FC Cincinnati	68	(9)
2022	FC Cincinnati 2	1	(1)
2023–	Herediano	104	(21)

International career^{‡}
2015	Costa Rica U23	2	(0)
2018–	Costa Rica	27	(2)
- * Club domestic league appearances and goals as of 26 May 2026 ‡ National team caps and goals as of 14 October 2025

Allan Enzo Cruz Leal (born 24 February 1996) is a Costa Rican professional footballer who plays as a midfielder for Herediano and the Costa Rica national team.

== Club career ==
=== Uruguay de Coronado ===
Born in Nicoya, in the province of Guanacaste, Cruz began his career with then Primera División club Uruguay de Coronado. On 29 August 2015, Cruz made his professional debut for the club in their 2–0 victory against Saprissa. Prior to his debut, Cruz spent a short period on loan with Generación Saprissa.

On 7 November, Cruz scored his first competitive goal for Uruguay de Coronado in the 11th minute of a 2–1 defeat against Santos de Guápiles.

=== Herediano ===
Prior to the 2017–18 season, Cruz joined Herediano. He made his debut during the club's first game of the season on 29 July 2017 against Guadalupe. He was a starter as Herediano drew the match 0–0. His first goal for the side came on 20 January 2018 against Saprissa in a 1–0 home victory. He ended his first season with Herediano having played in 46 matches and scoring 3 goals.

On 20 February 2018, Cruz made his CONCACAF Champions League debut in Herediano's 2–2 draw against Tigres UANL. The next season, Cruz helped Herediano reach the final of the CONCACAF League, scoring in the first leg of the final against Honduran club Motagua in a 2–0 victory. He then started in the second leg on 1 November as Herediano lost 2–1 but won 3–2 on aggregate.

In December 2018, Cruz helped Herediano win the 2018 Apertura. He started for the club in the second leg of the final against Saprissa as Herediano drew the match 2–2 and won on aggregate 5–4.

=== FC Cincinnati ===
On 18 January 2019, it was announced that Cruz had signed with Major League Soccer club FC Cincinnati prior to their inaugural season. He made his debut for the club on 10 March 2019, starting in their 1–1 away draw against Atlanta United. Cruz then scored his first goal for FC Cincinnati in their next match against the Portland Timbers. His 61st-minute goal was the second in a 3–0 victory at Nippert Stadium. Cruz ended his first season with FC Cincinnati with 7 goals in 22 matches.

On 1 March 2020, Cruz scored FC Cincinnati's first goal of the 2020 season against the New York Red Bulls, however the club lost the match 3–2.

On October 24, 2022, it was announced that Cruz was departing FC Cincinnati following the end of the 2022 season.

=== Herediano ===
In 2023, Cruz signed once again for Herediano.

== International career ==
In September 2018, Cruz was called into the Costa Rica squad which would take on South Korea and Japan in international friendlies. He started for Costa Rica as they lost 2–0 on 7 September 2018. On 20 November 2018, Cruz scored his first ever goal for his country in their 3–2 victory over Peru at the Estadio de la UNSA.

On 5 June 2019, Cruz was included in Gustavo Matosas' squad for the 2019 CONCACAF Gold Cup. He scored Costa Rica's third goal in their opening 3–0 victory against Nicaragua.

== Career statistics ==
=== Club ===
As of match played 26 October 2025

Appearances and goals by club, season and competition
Club	Season	League			National cup		Continental		Other		Total	
Club	Season	Division	Apps	Goals	Apps	Goals	Apps	Goals	Apps	Goals	Apps	Goals
Uruguay de Coronado	2015–16	Liga FPD	24	1	—		—		—		21	1
Herediano	2017–18	Liga FPD	46	3	—		2	0	—		48	3
Herediano	2018–19	Liga FPD	19	4	—		8	1	—		27	5
Herediano	Total		65	7	0	0	10	1	—		75	8
FC Cincinnati	2019	Major League Soccer	22	7	—		—		—		22	7
FC Cincinnati	2020	Major League Soccer	13	1	—		—		2 (Note: Appearances in MLS is Back Tournament)	0	15	1
FC Cincinnati	2021	Major League Soccer	22	1	—		—		—		22	1
FC Cincinnati	2022	Major League Soccer	11	0	0	0	—		1 (Note: Appearance in Leagues Cup)	0	12	0
FC Cincinnati	Total		68	9	0	0	—		3	0	71	8
Herediano	2023–24	Liga FPD	36	9	2	0	5	0	5 (Note: Appearances in Central American Cup)	1	48	10
Herediano	2024–25	Liga FPD	39	11	1	0	0	0	5	0	45	11
Herediano	2025–26	Liga FPD	8	1	0	0	0	0	2	0	10	1
Herediano	Total		83	21	3	0	5	0	12	1	103	22
Career total			258	40	3	0	15	1	15	1	291	49

=== International ===
As of match played 14 October 2025

Appearances and goals by national team and year
National team	Year	Apps	Goals
Costa Rica	2018	6	1
Costa Rica	2019	11	1
Costa Rica	2021	7	0
Costa Rica	2025	3	0
Total		27	2

== Honours ==
Herediano

- Primera División: 2018 Apertura
- CONCACAF League: 2018
