= Alan Koch (soccer) =

South African soccer coach (born 1975)

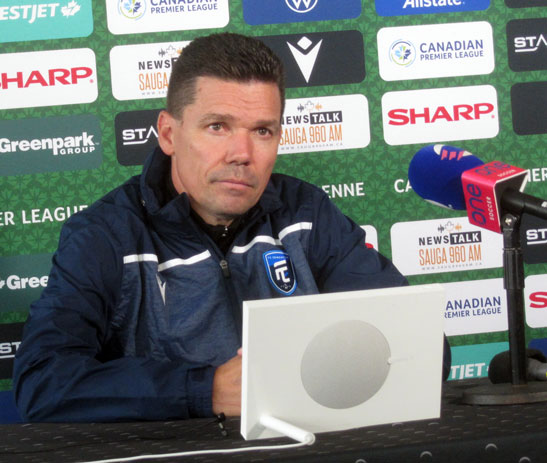
- Koch in 2021

Personal information
- Full name: Alan Keith Koch
- Date of birth: 30 April 1975 (age 51)
- Place of birth: Durban, South Africa
- Height: 5 ft 11 in (1.80 m)
- Position: Central midfielder

Senior career*
Years	Team	Apps	(Gls)
1993–1994	Reservoir Hills United		
1995–1996	KTSV Preussen Krefeld		
1996-1999	Simon Fraser University		
2000–2001	Limerick		

International career
1995	South Africa U23		

Managerial career
- 2003–2005: Midwestern State Mustangs (assistant)
- 2006–2008: Baker Wildcats
- 2009: Vancouver Whitecaps FC (women)
- 2008–2015: Simon Fraser Clan
- 2015–2016: Whitecaps FC 2
- 2017–2019: FC Cincinnati
- 2019–2020: Colorado Springs Switchbacks
- 2020–2022: FC Edmonton
- 2023–2025: Western Suburbs FC
- 2025–: Guelph Gryphons
- 2026–: Guelph United
- * Club domestic league appearances and goals

Alan Koch (born 30 April 1975) is a South African soccer coach who is the head coach and sporting manager of the University of Guelph's men's soccer program, as well as head coach of Ontario Premier League club Guelph United. Prior to these roles, he was the head coach of New Zealand outfit Western Suburbs FC and technical director for Olé Football Academy. Koch is a former South African youth national team player, professional player and coach. He is a graduate of Simon Fraser University where he earned his bachelor's degree. He earned his master's degree from Midwestern State University in 2005. Koch was previously the head coach of FC Cincinnati in Major League Soccer.

== Early life ==
Koch attended Westville Boys' High School in his native South Africa. He was there selected as the captain of the South African Schoolboys team in 1992. He played for Reservoir Hills United in 1993 and was coached by Professor Ngubane in the OK League. He left South Africa in 1995 to sign with KTSV Preussen Krefeld of the German Oberliga. He was also briefly with Wattenscheid 09 and Bayer Uerdingen of the 2.Bundesliga. He signed for Limerick of the League of Ireland in 2000. In 2001, on advice from medical experts, Koch retired from football due to a heart condition.

== Coaching career ==
=== Midwestern State ===
Koch began his coaching tenure as an assistant coach at Midwestern State University. In his first season in 2003, Koch helped the Mustangs finish 17–5 and reach the NCAA Elite Eight. In 2004, he also help guide them to a 12–6 record. In his final year with Midwestern State University in 2005, while completing his master's degree, the Mustangs finished the season 13–3–2. Koch then moved on to Baker University where he was offered the head coaching position.

=== Baker University ===
At Baker University, Koch took on his first head coaching position and finished his first season in charge with a 9–9 record in 2006. The next season, Koch guided the Wildcats to a 13–7 record while reaching the regional semi-finals in the NCAA National Tournament. Koch was then presented with an opportunity to move to Vancouver, British Columbia to take over the Simon Fraser University head coaching position.

=== Vancouver Whitecaps FC W-League ===
Koch also had a spell in charge of the Vancouver Whitecaps W-League team in 2009. He performed an instrumental role in stabilizing the women’s program during a challenging transition period as he guided the Women's team to a 5th-place finish, which saw them narrowly missed out on the playoffs.

=== Simon Fraser University ===
Koch spent seven seasons at Simon Fraser University as the head coach of the Men's Soccer Team. He was the 2009 and 2010 AII coach of the year, and also the 2010, 2011, 2012 GNAC coach of the year. 2011 was also a landmark season for the Men's Soccer Team as they became the first non-American school to be ranked in the NCAA top 25. On 18 October 2011, the Men's Soccer Team reached No. 1 in the NCAA division 2 national rankings. At the conclusion of the NCAA regular season, the Men's Soccer Team remained as the No. 1 team in the NCAA. In November 2012, Simon Fraser University became the first Canadian team to qualify for an NCAA division 2 National Tournament. The team went on a historic run and qualified for the Final Four hosted in Evans, Georgia. At the end of the NCAA season, the Men's Soccer team became the No. 3 ranked team in the NCAA. On 5 December 2012, Koch was named NSCAA Regional Coach of the year. During the 2012 season, Koch and the Simon Fraser University Men's Soccer team were featured in the New York Times. In 2013, Koch again led Simon Fraser to another top four appearance in the NCAA Soccer Division 2 National Tournament. During his tenure at Simon Fraser University, Koch successfully transformed an underperforming program that had only reached one semifinal in 25 years into a consistent national contender, leading the team to three national semifinals in seven seasons and delivered the only undefeated season in the programs history in 2010.

=== Team Canada – Maccabiah Games ===
Koch helped lead Team Canada in the 2013 Maccabiah Games in Jerusalem, Israel to a bronze medal after a hard-fought 4–1 win against Mexico. Koch's Team Canada qualified to the quarter-finals as the runners up in the group after beating Chile 3–0, Venezuela 4–1 before losing to the defending champions Argentina 4–1 in the final group stage match. They were then drawn against heavy favourites Brazil in the quarter-finals and Canada thrilled the crowd with a big 1–0 win before moving onto playing the United States in the semi-finals. The United States proved to be too much for Team Canada who was sent to the bronze medal match against Mexico.

=== Vancouver Whitecaps FC ===
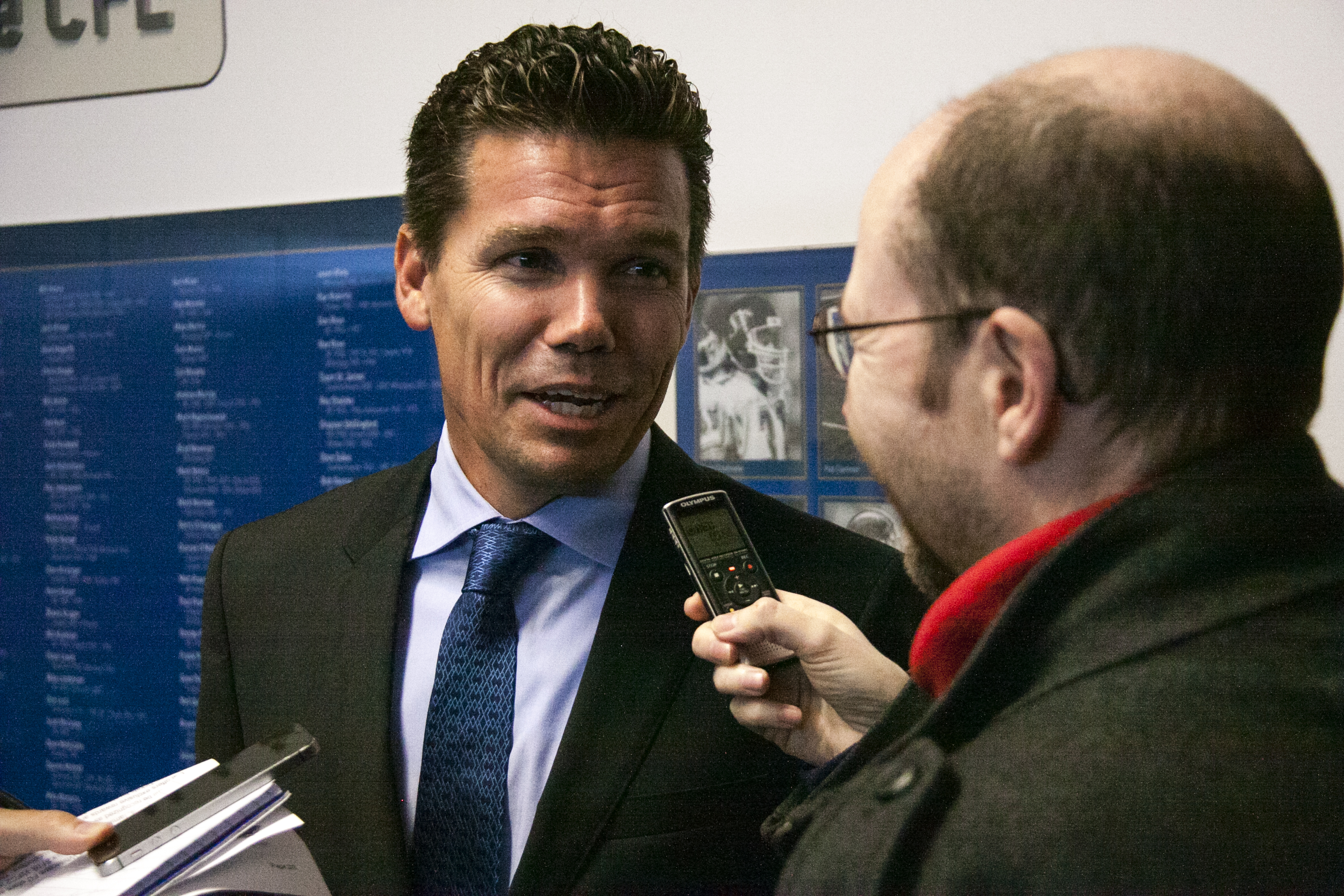
Alan Koch being interviewed after he was appointed as Whitecaps FC 2's head coach

Koch began his time with Vancouver Whitecaps FC as the primary college scout ahead of the 2015 MLS SuperDraft. With the No. 13 selection in the draft, the Whitecaps selected future U.S. Men's National Team defender Tim Parker, who has emerged as one of MLS' top center backs since becoming a professional. He formally joined the organisation as the first-ever head coach of Whitecaps FC 2, Vancouver's USL affiliate, on 30 January 2015. Koch launched and led Whitecaps FC 2 with one of the youngest squads and lowest operating budgets in the USL. After missing out on the USL Cup Playoffs in year one, Koch led Whitecaps FC 2 to its best season in its three years of existence, producing a 12–9–9 record. As the No. 6 seed, Vancouver advanced to the Western Conference Finals of the USL Cup Playoffs.

The head coach was instrumental in the development of multiple players who progressed to represent their countries at FIFA World Cup finals and he gave Alphonso Davies his first minutes as a professional soccer player at the age of 15 on 2 April 2016 at Portland Timbers 2. Davies went on to sign for Bayern Munich at the end of the 2018 MLS season.

=== FC Cincinnati ===
He joined FC Cincinnati in the United Soccer League as the Director of Scouting and Analytics and Assistant Coach in December 2016.[16] Just two months later, he was named the second head coach in club history on 17 February 2017.[17]

In his first year with FC Cincinnati, Koch guided the club to the semifinal round of the Lamar Hunt U.S. Open Cup. The Orange and Blue claimed wins over MLS sides Columbus Crew SC and the Chicago Fire as well as a win over NASL Fall Champions, Miami FC. In the USL regular season, Koch led FC Cincinnati to a 12–10–10 record, placing Cincinnati in the USL Cup Playoffs for a second-consecutive season.

In 2018, with Koch at the helm, the Orange and Blue had a historic season which saw FC Cincinnati set club highs in total wins (23), total points (77), home wins (12), home points (30), away wins (11), and away points (38). FC Cincinnati claimed the USL Regular Season Championship after posting a 23–3–8 record, earning Cincinnati the top seed in the Eastern Conference for the USL Cup Playoffs. Koch led FC Cincinnati to its first-ever postseason win with the club defeated Nashville SC 1–1 (6–5 on penalties) in an Eastern Conference quarterfinal-round match. Following the conclusion of the season, Koch was named the USL Coach of the Year for Cincinnati's record-breaking season.

Koch remained with FC Cincinnati as they moved up to Major League Soccer and was instrumental in building the club’s inaugural MLS roster in 2019. However, after 11 MLS games with a 2–7–2 record, Koch was fired by the club on 7 May 2019. General manager Jeff Berding said the firing was the result of a declining club culture rather than directly due to the results on the pitch.[18]

=== Colorado Springs Switchbacks ===
On 23 September 2019, Koch was named head coach of USL Championship side Colorado Springs Switchbacks FC. Having taken charge of a club that had finished bottom of the 2018 Western Conference USL Championship, Koch successfully re-established the competitiveness of the sporting organization. And in the 2020 coronavirus impacted season Koch improved the team's fortunes from 18th position in the 2019 league standings to 13th position in the 2020 USL Western Conference standings.

=== FC Edmonton ===
On 24 November 2020, Koch was named head coach and director of football operations of Canadian Premier League side FC Edmonton. Koch inherited a team that had only earned one point in the previous season in the 2020 Canadian Premier League. However, he successful transformed the fortunes of the club, making an instant impact as he improved team performance and they accumulated 27 points and narrowly missed out on the 2021 play-offs. Koch helped to stabilize the organization during a major ownership and operation crisis in 2022, as he provided leadership across both football operations and broader club management to ensure league continuity.

=== Western Suburbs FC / Ole Football Academy ===
On 28 November 2022, Koch was appointed as the Technical Director of the Ole Football Academy in Wellington, New Zealand and on 20 February 2023 became the Head Coach of Western Suburbs FC. Once again Koch performed an instrumental role in transforming the fortunes of the sporting organization. When he was appointed as Head Coach of Western Suburbs FC, Koch took over a side which has narrowly avoided relegation from the National League (Central) on the final day of the previous campaign, however, he then guided them from a second-from-bottom finish to third-place in the league in his first season. In his second season in charge, Western Suburbs FC qualified for the 2024 New Zealand National League Championship phase, a feat they had not achieved in 51 years.

=== University of Guelph / Guelph Soccer Club ===
In January 2025, Koch became the head coach and sporting manager of the University of Guelph / Guelph Soccer Club

== Managerial statistics ==
As of 31 December 2024

Managerial record by team and tenure
Team	Nat	From	To	Record								Ref
Team	Nat	From	To	G	W	D	L	GF	GA	GD	Win %	Ref
Vancouver Whitecaps Women	(Canada)	2009	2009	12	3	5	4	15	19	−4	25.00	
Whitecaps FC 2	(Canada)	30 January 2015	14 December 2016	61	22	15	24	88	103	−15	36.07	
FC Cincinnati	(United States)	17 February 2017	7 May 2019	89	43	23	23	140	109	+31	48.31	
Colorado Springs Switchbacks	(United States)	23 September 2019	14 November 2020	18	2	8	8	20	32	−12	11.11	
FC Edmonton	(Canada)	24 November 2020	21 November 2022	58	10	18	30	66	96	−30	17.24	
Western Suburbs	(New Zealand)	20 February 2023	31 December 2024	46	22	6	18	105	89	+16	47.82	
Total				284	102	75	107	434	448	-14	35.91	

== Managerial achievements ==
=== Simon Fraser University ===
- 2009 NAIA Final Four
- A.I.I Champions – 2009, 2010
- 2012 NCAA D2 Final Four
- 2013 NCAA D2 Final Four
- 2014 NCAA 1st round
- GNAC Champions – 2010, 2011, 2012, 2013

=== United Soccer League ===
- 2017 US Open Cup Semi-finalist
- 2018 USL Regular Season Champions
- 2018 USL Coach of the Year

=== Major League Soccer ===
- 2019 MLS Week Three Coach of the Week
- 2019 MLS Week Four Coach of the Week

== Certification ==
Koch currently holds varying levels of coaching certification. These include NSCAA Premier Diploma with distinction, Canadian A License, USSF A License, SKNFCA Level 2, and UEFA A and B licences.
