= Nick Hagglund =

American soccer player (born 1992)

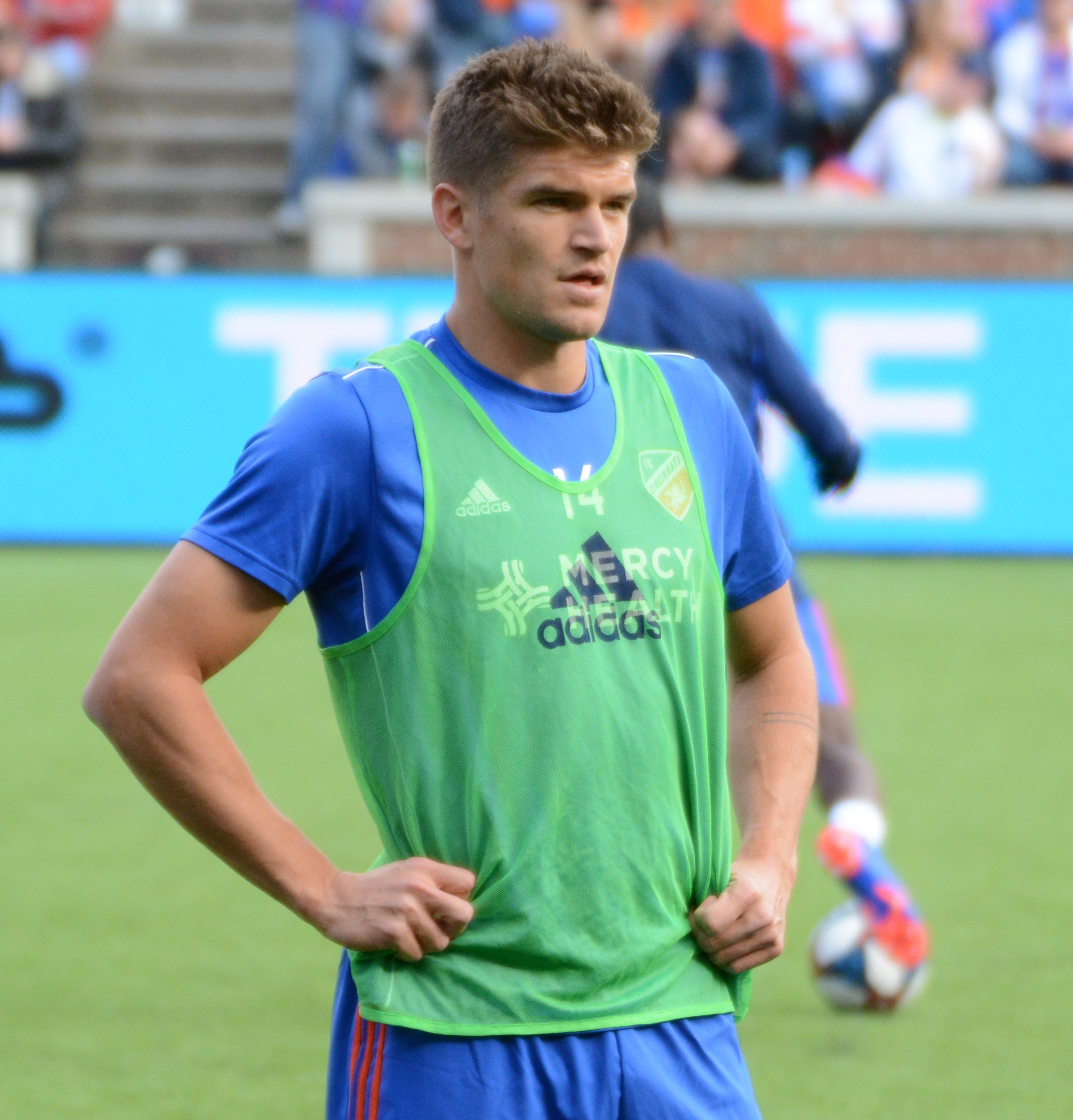
- Hagglund with FC Cincinnati in 2019

Personal information
- Full name: Nicholas Stuart Hagglund
- Date of birth: September 14, 1992 (age 34)
- Place of birth: Cincinnati, Ohio, United States
- Height: 6 ft 1 in (1.85 m)
- Position: Defender

Team information
- Current team: FC Cincinnati
- Number: 4

College career
Years	Team	Apps	(Gls)
2010–2013	Xavier Musketeers	81	(4)

Senior career*
Years	Team	Apps	(Gls)
2014–2018	Toronto FC	88	(5)
2015–2018	→ Toronto FC II (loan)	6	(1)
2019–	FC Cincinnati	165	(6)
2024–	→ FC Cincinnati 2 (loan)	4	(0)
- * Club domestic league appearances and goals as of 02:34, November 9, 2026 (UTC)

Nicholas Stuart Hagglund (born September 14, 1992) is an American professional soccer player who plays as a defender for Major League Soccer club FC Cincinnati.

== Career ==
=== Xavier University ===
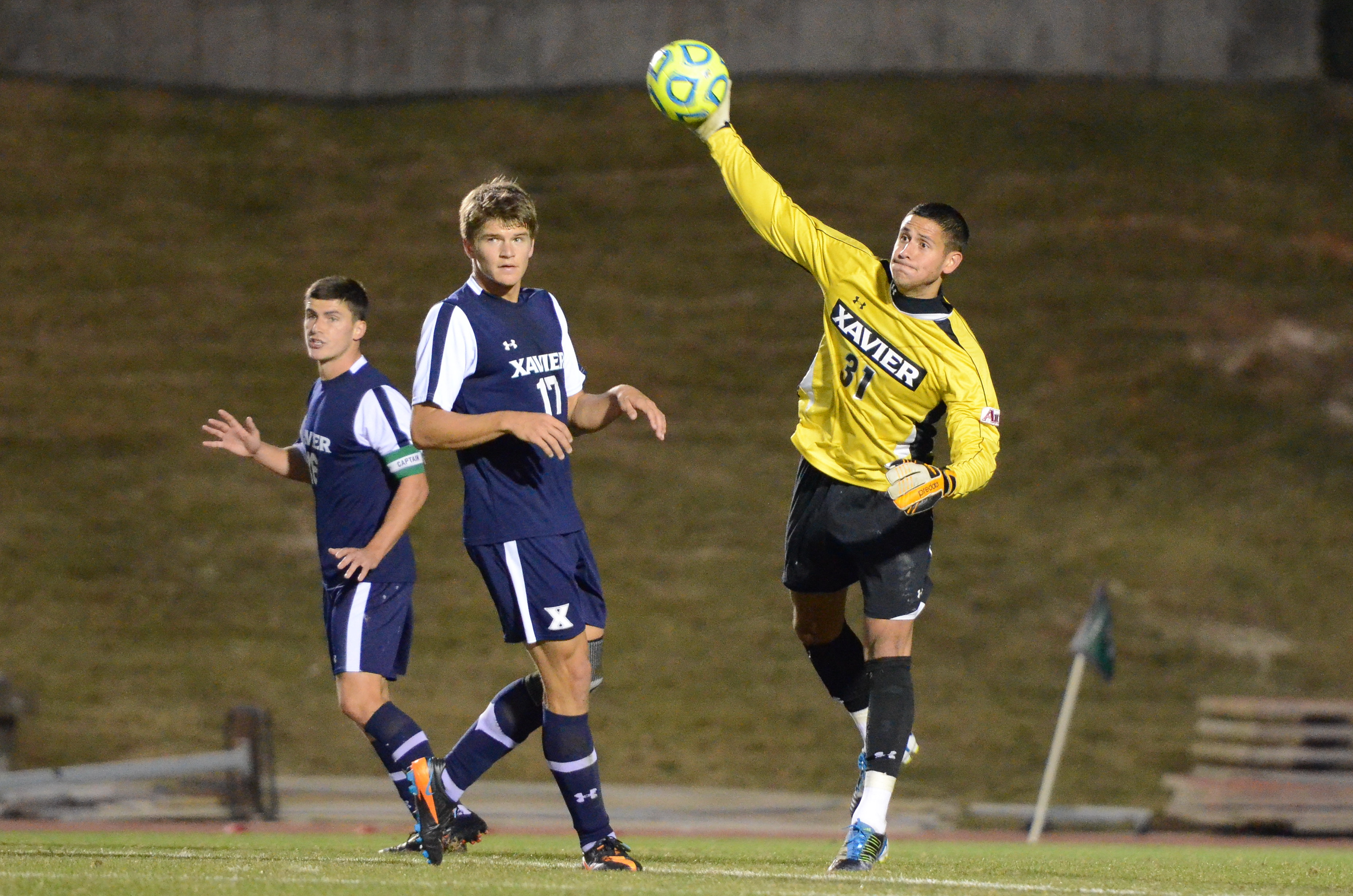
Hagglund (center) playing for Xavier in the 2012 Atlantic 10 Tournament semifinals

After attending Lakota West High School, Hagglund committed to Xavier University where he played four years of college soccer for the Musketeers. He made 81 appearances, starting in 80, while scoring four goals and adding 11 assists. Hagglund was named Big East Defensive Player of the Year for 2013, along with First Team All-Big East honors. During his collegiate career he has also earned Atlantic 10 Defensive Player honors, and was named to the Atlantic 10 All-Conference First Team. In his freshman campaign he was named to Atlantic 10 All-Rookie Team and Atlantic 10 All-Tournament Team.

=== Toronto FC ===
On January 16, 2014 Hagglund was drafted in the first round (10th overall) of the 2014 MLS SuperDraft by Toronto FC.

Hagglund made his professional debut in a 2–0 win over the Columbus Crew on April 5, 2014.

On September 27, 2014 Hagglund scored his first 2 goals in a 3–2 come from behind home victory against the Portland Timbers.

In August 2015, Hagglund was temporarily loaned to Toronto's lower division USL club, Toronto FC II.

On November 30, 2016, Hagglund scored the goal that put Toronto FC ahead 3–2 against the Montreal Impact in the Eastern Conference Final. This tied the aggregate score at 5–5, and sent the game into extra time. Toronto FC went on to score 2 in extra time to win the game 5–2 and earn their first-ever appearance in the MLS Cup against Seattle Sounders FC.

=== FC Cincinnati ===
On January 23, 2019, Hagglund was traded to his hometown team FC Cincinnati ahead of their inaugural season in MLS. Cincinnati received the No. 24 Allocation Ranking and Hagglund from Toronto in exchange for $200,000 in General Allocation Money in 2019, $100,000 in Targeted Allocation Money in 2020 and the No. 1 Allocation Ranking. He scored his first goal for the club on October 14, 2020 against the Columbus Crew, scoring the winning goal on a header from a set piece in the 49th minute, to give Cincinnati their first ever win in the MLS over their interstate rival.

Following the 2021 season, Cincinnati declined their contract option on Hagglund. He re-signed with the team on January 14, 2022.

Hagglund was a regular contributor for Cincinnati in 2021, 2022, and 2023, making 24, 32, and 27 regular season appearances in those seasons. However, he was then plagued by a string of injuries that limited his playing time beginning in the 2023 postseason. On November 1, 2023, the team confirmed that Hagglund would miss the rest of the playoffs due to an undisclosed injury, later revealed to be a torn hamstring.

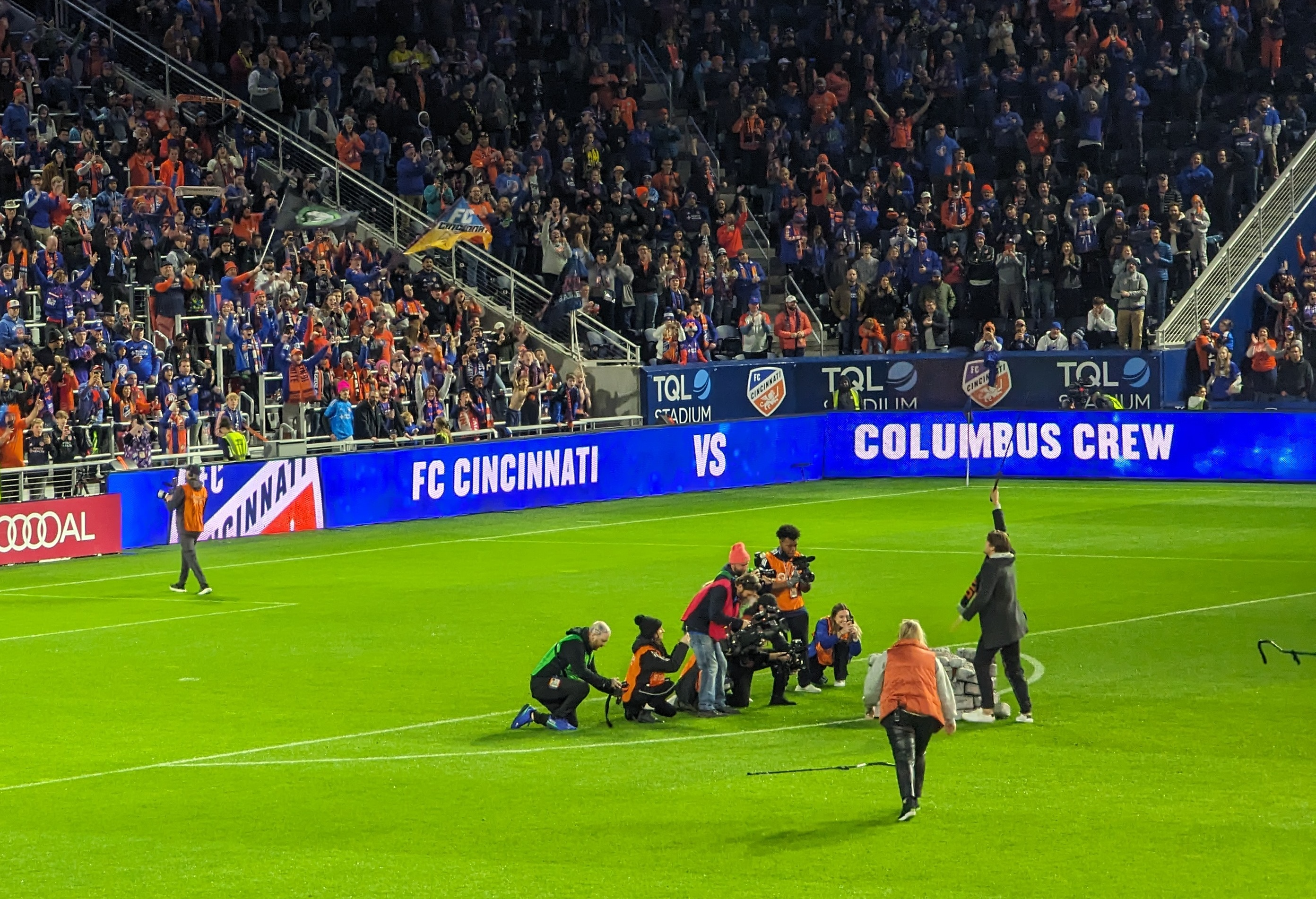
One month after his hamstring injury, Hagglund appeared before Cincinnati's match against Columbus Crew in the 2023 MLS Cup playoffs. He walked onto the pitch in crutches before tossing them aside and pulling a sword from a stone.

He spent the offseason recovering from surgery and missed the first four matches of the 2024 season. He made his return a substitute in the second half of a home match against New York City FC on March 23, 2024. He would then make ten appearances for the season, six of them as a starter. However, on June 22, he had to be carried off the pitch on a stretcher after suffering a broken fibula from a collision with New England Revolution's Esmir Bajraktarevic. On July 5, the club announced that he had undergone a successful ankle ligament reconstructive surgery and would miss the remainder of the 2024 season to recover.

Hagglund's recovery took longer than expected, as an MRI scan taken three months after surgery revealed the fibula still needed more time to heal. Hagglund's contract was renewed for three more years in January 2025, and he thus continued his rehabilitation at Cincinnati's 2025 preseason camp. Working through pain, he tried to speed up his recovery timeline in anticipation of the March 2025 international duty window, during which the club expected to lose some of their center-backs. He played in two FC Cincinnati 2 matches in early March before making his return to MLS play on March 22.

On May 25, Hagglund departed the pitch early after being knocked down by Emmanuel Latte Lath in the 10th minute of an away match against Atlanta United FC. No foul was given at the time, and a VAR check did not find cause to recommend a red card. The club announced the following day that Hagglund had suffered two broken ribs and a collapsed lung. He underwent two procedures at Grady Memorial Hospital in Atlanta. Following this injury and recovery, Hagglund next appeared for the FC Cincinnati first team on August 21, 2025 against Chivas in Leagues Cup.

On October 21, 2026, Hagglund re-claimed FC Cincinnati's all-time record for appearances in his 180th competitive match for the club, a record held since 2024 by Yūya Kubo.

== Career statistics ==
As of match played October 31, 2026

Club	Season	League			Playoffs (Note: Includes MLS Cup playoffs)		National cup (Note: Includes Canadian Championship and U.S. Open Cup)		League cup (Note: Includes Leagues Cup)		Continental		Other		Total	
Club	Season	Division	Apps	Goals	Apps	Goals	Apps	Goals	Apps	Goals	Apps	Goals	Apps	Goals	Apps	Goals
Toronto FC	2014	MLS	25	2	—		2	0	—		—		—		27	2
Toronto FC	2015	MLS	12	0	—		2	0	—		—		—		14	0
Toronto FC	2016	MLS	16	0	6	1	4	0	—		—		—		26	1
Toronto FC	2017	MLS	15	0	4	0	—		—		—		—		19	0
Toronto FC	2018	MLS	20	3	—		4	0	—		4 (Note: Appearances in CONCACAF Champions League/Cup)	0	1 (Note: Appearance in Campeones Cup)	0	29	3
Toronto FC	Totals		88	5	10	1	12	0	—		4	0	1	0	115	6
Toronto FC II (loan)	2015	USL	1	0	—		—		—		—		—		1	0
Toronto FC II (loan)	2016	USL	4	1	—		—		—		—		—		4	1
Toronto FC II (loan)	2018	USL	1	0	—		—		—		—		—		1	0
Toronto FC II (loan)	Totals		6	1	—		—		—		—		—		6	1
FC Cincinnati	2019	MLS	22	0	—		2	0	—		—		—		24	0
FC Cincinnati	2020	MLS	11	1	—		—		—		—		—		11	1
FC Cincinnati	2021	MLS	24	1	—		—		—		—		—		24	1
FC Cincinnati	2022	MLS	32	1	2	0	2	0	—		—		—		36	1
FC Cincinnati	2023	MLS	27	1	—		4	0	3	0	—		—		34	1
FC Cincinnati	2024	MLS	10	0	—		—		—		—		—		10	0
FC Cincinnati	2025	MLS	17	1	3	0	—		1	0	—		—		21	1
FC Cincinnati	2026	MLS	22	1	—		—		—		1	0	—		23	1
FC Cincinnati	Totals		165	6	5	0	8	0	4	0	1	0	—		183	6
FC Cincinnati 2 (loan)	2024	MLS Next Pro	1	0	—		—		—		—		—		1	0
FC Cincinnati 2 (loan)	2025	MLSNP	3	0	—		—		—		—		—		3	0
FC Cincinnati 2 (loan)	Totals		4	0	—		—		—		—		—		4	0
Career totals			260	12	15	1	20	0	4	0	5	0	1	0	305	13

== Honors ==
Toronto FC

- MLS Cup: 2017
- Supporters' Shield: 2017
- Eastern Conference Winners (Playoffs): 2016, 2017
- Canadian Championship: 2016, 2017
- Trillium Cup: 2016, 2017

FC Cincinnati

- Supporters' Shield: 2023

Individual

- MLS Comeback Player of the Year Award: 2025
- Big East Defensive Player of the Year: 2013
- All-Big East First Team: 2013
