= Frankie Amaya =

American soccer player (born 2000)

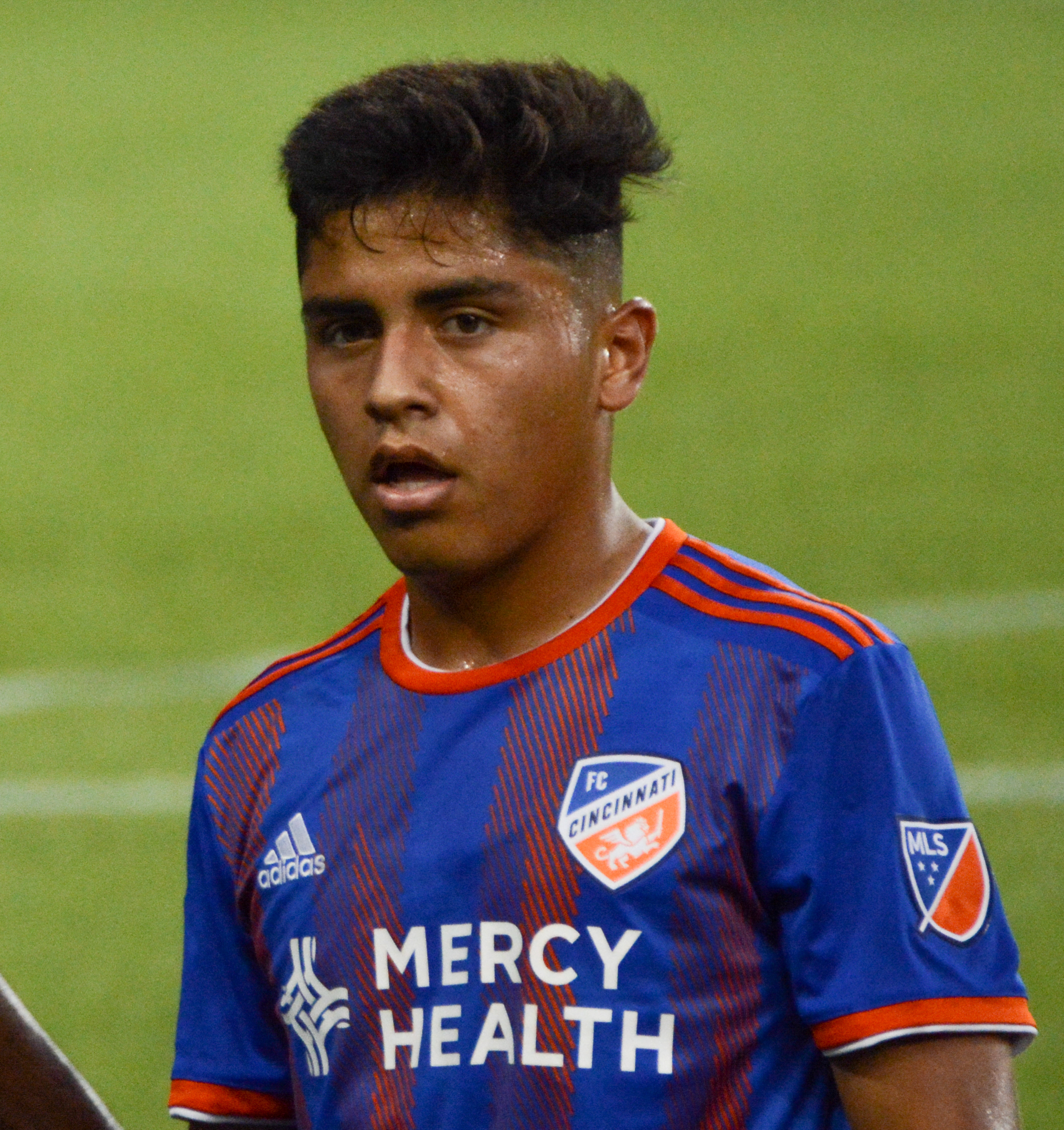
- Amaya with FC Cincinnati in 2019

Personal information
- Full name: Franuel Amaya
- Date of birth: September 26, 2000 (age 26)
- Place of birth: Santa Ana, California, United States
- Height: 5 ft 4 in (1.63 m)
- Position: Midfielder

Team information
- Current team: CF Montréal (on loan from Toluca)
- Number: 25

Youth career
- 2014–2017: Pateadores

College career
Years	Team	Apps	(Gls)
2018	UCLA Bruins	14	(2)

Senior career*
Years	Team	Apps	(Gls)
2019–2021	FC Cincinnati	40	(39)
2019	→ Orange County SC (loan)	2	(0)
2021–2024	New York Red Bulls	91	(8)
2024–	Toluca	15	(0)
2025	→ Los Angeles FC (loan)	19	(1)
2026–	→ CF Montréal (loan)	0	(0)

International career
2018–2019	United States U20	9	(0)
- * Club domestic league appearances and goals as of April 2, 2026

Franuel "Frankie" Amaya (born September 26, 2000) is an American professional soccer player who plays as a midfielder for Major League Soccer club CF Montréal, on loan from Liga MX club Toluca.

== Club career ==
=== Youth and college ===
Amaya played club soccer for Pateadores SC in Orange County, California. With the club, he helped the team win the region's West Conference and was named the West Conference Best XI. Ahead of the 2018 NCAA Division I men's soccer season, Amaya was listed as a four-star recruit by TopDrawerSoccer.com, and ranked number six overall in the IMG Academy Top 150 for his graduating class. Amaya was also listed by TDS has the number one club player in Southern California, and the number four midfielder nationally.

During the 2018 season, Amaya made 14 appearances with UCLA, 10 of which were starts. Amaya made his college soccer debut on August 24, 2018, against Coastal Carolina. With UCLA, Amaya scored twice, with his first goal coming on September 22, 2018, against UC Santa Barbara in a 1–3 loss. Amaya tallied two assists on the season with his first coming on August 28, 2018, against UC San Diego, and his second coming on October 13, 2018, against San Diego State. Amaya did not appear for any more matches with UCLA after October 28, as he joined the U.S. under 20s for the 2018 CONCACAF U-20 Championship.

At the conclusion of the 2018 Pac-12 Conference men's soccer season, Amaya was honored with Freshman All-American, First Team All-Pac-12, and Second Team All-Far West Region honors.

=== FC Cincinnati ===
On January 4, 2019, Amaya signed a Generation adidas contract with Major League Soccer forgoing his final three years of college eligibility. On January 11, 2019, he was drafted first overall in the 2019 MLS SuperDraft by FC Cincinnati.

On July 16, 2020, Amaya scored his first professional goal for FC Cincinnati in the group stage of the MLS is Back Tournament against Atlanta United, in which was the only goal of the game, a 1–0 win for FC Cincinnati.

=== New York Red Bulls ===
On April 9, 2021, Amaya was rumored to be traded from FC Cincinnati to the New York Red Bulls. The trade, which was officially confirmed on April 20, was in exchange for $950,000 in general allocation money, with an additional $125,000 of potential allocation money depending on performance incentives. On April 25, 2021, Amaya made his first appearance for New York in a 3–2 loss to Los Angeles Galaxy. On May 8, 2021, he scored his first goal for New York in a 2–0 victory over Toronto FC.

On June 24, 2023, Amaya recorded his first two-goal game of his career, scoring twice for New York in a 4–0 victory over Atlanta United, his second goal of the match was New York's 1,500th goal in club history across all competitions. As a result of his performance he was selected to the MLS team of the Match Day. On July 8, 2023, Amaya recorded a goal and an assist to help New York to a 2–1 victory over New England Revolution. His play during that match earned him another selection to the MLS Team of the Match Day.

== International career ==
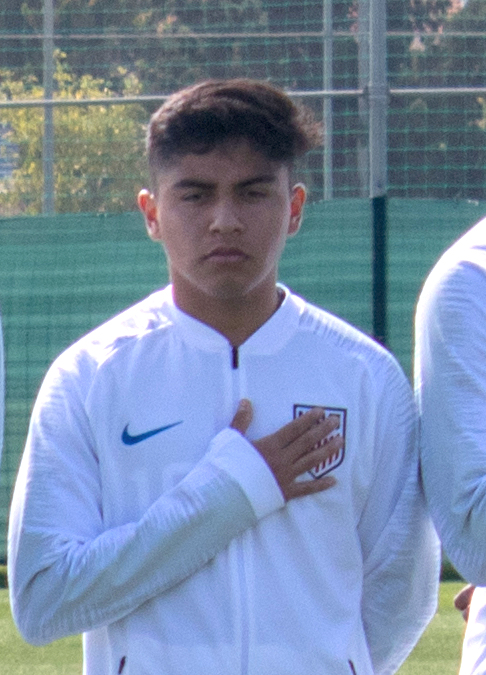
Amaya with the U.S. men's U-20 team in 2019

Amaya made his debut with the United States national under-20 team on March 21, 2018, against France. He was also named to the squad for the CONCACAF Under-20 Championship in November 2018.

On November 30, 2020, Amaya was called up by the United States national team for a friendly against El Salvador. On December 1, he was removed from the squad after contracting COVID-19 and was replaced by Andres Perea.

== Personal life ==
Born in the United States to Mexican parents, Amaya holds a U.S. and Mexican citizenship.

== Career statistics ==
=== Club ===
As of match played June 2, 2024

Appearances and goals by club, season and competition
Club	Season	League			National cup		WORLD CUP 2022		Continental		Other		Total
Club	Season	Division	Apps	Goals	Apps	Goals	Apps	Goals	Apps	Goals	Apps	Goals	
FC Cincinnati	2019	MLS	19	0	2	0	—		—		21	0	
FC Cincinnati	2020	MLS	21	1	—		—		—		21	1	
FC Cincinnati	Total		40	1	2	0	—		—		42	1	
Orange County SC (loan)	2019	USL	2	0	—		—		—		2	0	
New York Red Bulls	2021	MLS	22	1	—		—		—		22	1	
New York Red Bulls	2022	MLS	24	1	5	0	—		1 (Note: Appearance(s) in MLS Cup Playoffs)	0	30	1	
New York Red Bulls	2023	MLS	25	5	—		4 (Note: Appearances in Leagues Cup)	0	3	0	32	5	
New York Red Bulls	2024	MLS	20	1	—		—		—		20	1	
New York Red Bulls	Total		91	8	5	0	4	0	4	0	104	8	
Toluca	2024–25	Liga MX	0	0	—		—		—		0	0	
Career total			133	9	7	0	4	0	4	0	148	9	

== Honors ==
United States U20

- CONCACAF U-20 Championship: 2018
