= Gerard Nijkamp =

Dutch football manager (born 1970)

Personal information
- Date of birth: 1970 (age 55–56)
- Place of birth: Slagharen, Hardenberg, Netherlands

Senior career*
| Years | Team | Apps | (Gls) |
- Vv EMMS
- SV Zwolle
- CSV '28
- Be Quick '28

Managerial career
- 2003–2019: PEC Zwolle
- 2019–2021: FC Cincinnati
- * Club domestic league appearances and goals

Gerard Nijkamp (born 1970) is a Dutch football player and manager. He worked in various coaching and managerial roles for Dutch club PEC Zwolle from 1998 until 2019, when he started in his role as general manager of FC Cincinnati. He continued in that role until 6 August 2021.

== Managerial career ==
=== PEC Zwolle ===
Nijkamp was an assistant coach and academy director at PEC Zwolle from 1998 to 2007. He was appointed as the club's interim coach in September 2003 after Peter Boeve was fired. He coached for two matches before Hennie Spijkerman was hired as a permanent replacement.

Nijkamp became the technical director of PEC Zwolle in 2012. He was responsible for hiring Ron Jans as Zwolle's coach in 2013. Zwolle won the KNVB Cup in 2014 during Nijkamp's tenure.

=== FC Cincinnati ===
On 30 May 2019, FC Cincinnati of the American league Major League Soccer announced that they had hired Nijkamp as their general manager. The previous holder of the position, Jeff Berding, retained his position on the business side of the organization as the club's president, but would no longer be directly involved with soccer operations. Nijkamp continued working with PEC Zwolle to help with the transition to a new director, but became full-time at Cincinnati by 1 August.

On 4 August 2019, Ron Jans was signed as FC Cincinnati's permanent head coach under Nijkamp's tenure, replacing interim coach Yoann Damet. Nijkamp had previously hired Jans to be PEC Zwolle's coach in 2013.

On 6 August 2021, FC Cincinnati announced that the club and Nijkamp had "parted ways effective immediately".
