= Rashawn Dally =

Jamaican footballer (born 1997)

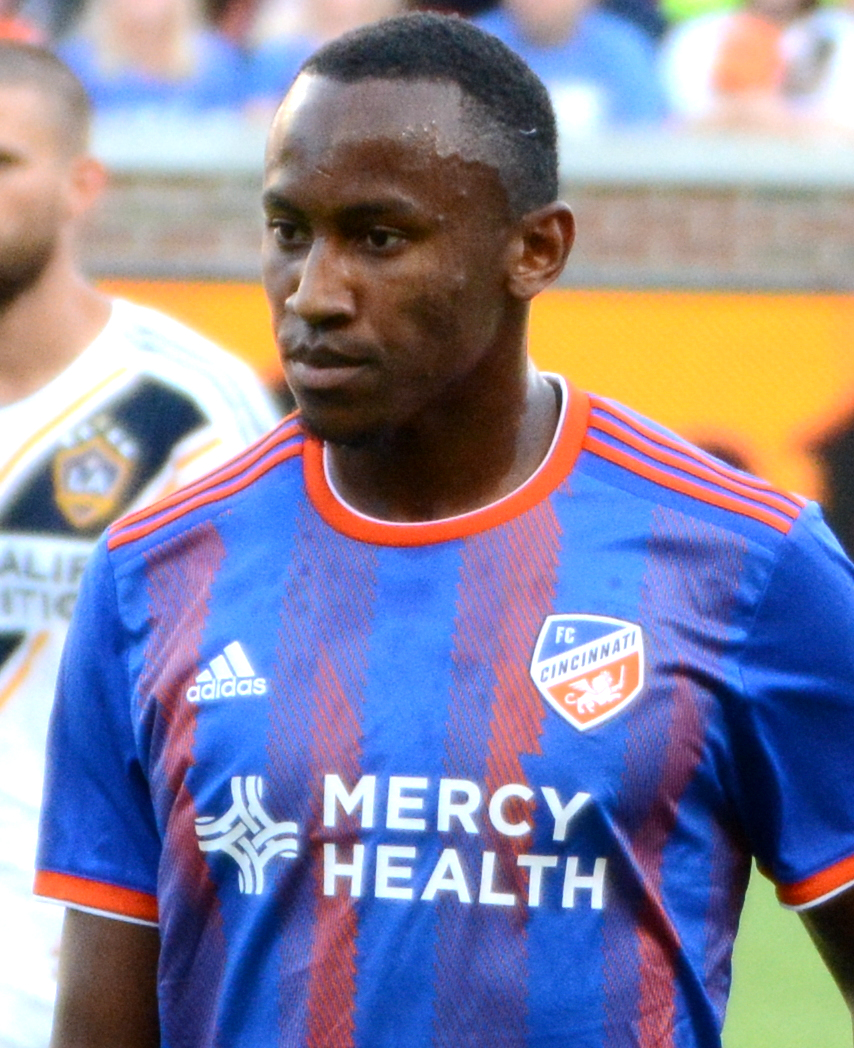
- Dally with FC Cincinnati in 2019

Personal information
- Date of birth: 14 January 1997 (age 29)
- Place of birth: Bloomfield, Connecticut, United States
- Height: 1.88 m (6 ft 2 in)
- Positions: Winger; forward

College career
Years	Team	Apps	(Gls)
2015–2018	Quinnipiac Bobcats	78	(16)

Senior career*
Years	Team	Apps	(Gls)
2016	AC Connecticut	4	(0)
2017	Myrtle Beach Mutiny	10	(2)
2017	FC Golden State Force	0	(0)
2018	Hartford City FC	9	(2)
2019–2020	FC Cincinnati	16	(1)
2019	→ Memphis 901 (loan)	12	(1)
2020	→ Las Vegas Lights (loan)	14	(3)
2021	Memphis 901	23	(0)
2022	Hartford Athletic	29	(3)
2023	Memphis 901	29	(3)

International career
- Jamaica U17
2016	Jamaica U20		
- * Club domestic league appearances and goals as of 17 October 2023

Rashawn Dally (born 14 January 1997) is a professional footballer who plays as a winger. Born in the United States, he represented Jamaica at youth level.

== Career ==
=== Early career ===
Dally played varsity soccer at Watkinson School followed by four years of college soccer at Quinnipiac University between 2015 and 2018, making 78 appearances, scoring 16 goals and tallying 15 assists.

While at college, Dally appeared for USL PDL sides AC Connecticut, Myrtle Beach Mutiny, FC Golden State Force, and National Premier Soccer League side Hartford City FC.

=== Professional ===
On 14 January 2019, Dally was selected 49th overall in the 2019 MLS SuperDraft by FC Cincinnati. He signed with the club on 28 February 2019.

On 5 March 2019, Dally was loaned to USL Championship side Memphis 901 for their 2019 season.

Dally was loaned out again on 8 July 2020 to USL Championship side Las Vegas Lights.

He was released by Cincinnati at the end of their 2020 season.

In April 2021, Dally returned to Memphis 901 FC, signing a contract with the club ahead of the 2021 season.

On January 13, 2022, Dally signed for USL Championship club Hartford Athletic.

On March 7, 2023, Dally returned again to Memphis 901 for this third spell at the club.

=== International ===
Dally represents Jamaica internationally, having appeared for the nation at the under-17 and under-20 levels. He was called in to the senior national team training camp in March 2018.
