= 2021 FC Cincinnati season =

Season of American association football team

FC Cincinnati
2021 season
- General manager: Gerard Nijkamp (until Aug. 6); Chris Albright (from Oct. 4)
- Head coach: Jaap Stam (until Sep. 27); Tyrone Marshall (interim)
- Stadium: TQL Stadium
- MLS: Conference: 14th Overall: 27th
- U.S. Open Cup: Canceled
- Highest home attendance: 25,701 (7/9 v. CLB)
- Lowest home attendance: 6,000 (5/16 v. MIA)
- Average home league attendance: 21,157
- Biggest win: TOR 0–2 CIN (6/26); CIN 2–0 TOR (9/11)
- Biggest defeat: NYCFC 5–0 CIN (4/24)
Home colors	Away colors

The 2021 FC Cincinnati season was the club's third season in MLS, and the sixth season of a team playing under the FC Cincinnati brand after three years in the lower-division USL Championship. The club finished with a league worst 4–15–4 record in their second MLS season in 2020, one shortened by the COVID-19 pandemic in Ohio. The season was the first year that FC Cincinnati played home matches at newly built TQL Stadium.

FC Cincinnati's offseason transfers were executed under general manager Gerard Nijkamp and head coach Jaap Stam. On August 6, 2021, Nijkamp and the club mutually agreed to part ways. On September 27, 2021, Stam was relieved of his duties. The team ended the season with a 4–22–8 record, with the team not being able to qualify into the MLS Cup Playoffs for the third consecutive season with a third consecutive last place finish in the overall table.

== Club ==
=== Roster ===
As of October 18, 2021

No.	Name	Nationality	Position	Date of birth (age)	Previous club
22	Przemysław Tytoń	Poland	GK	April 1, 1987 (age 39)	(Spain) Deportivo La Coruña
25	Kenneth Vermeer (INTL)	Netherlands	GK	January 10, 1986 (age 40)	(United States) Los Angeles FC
30	Beckham Sunderland (HG)	United States	GK	June 30, 2003 (age 23)	(United States) FC Cincinnati Academy
2	Edgar Castillo	United States	DF	October 8, 1986 (age 39)	(United States) Atlanta United FC
3	Tyler Blackett (INTL)	England	DF	April 2, 1994 (age 32)	(England) Nottingham Forest
4	Maikel van der Werff (INTL)	Netherlands	DF	April 22, 1989 (age 37)	(Netherlands) SBV Vitesse
5	Gustavo Vallecilla (INTL)	Ecuador	DF	May 28, 1999 (age 27)	(Ecuador) S.D. Aucas
12	Geoff Cameron	United States	DF	July 11, 1985 (age 41)	(England) Queens Park Rangers F.C.
13	Joe Gyau	United States	DF	September 16, 1992 (age 34)	(Germany) MSV Duisburg
14	Nick Hagglund	United States	DF	September 14, 1992 (age 34)	(Canada) Toronto FC
16	Zico Bailey (HG)	United States	DF	August 27, 2000 (age 26)	(Denmark) FC Helsingør
18	Rónald Matarrita	Costa Rica	DF	July 9, 1994 (age 32)	(United States) New York City FC
26	Chris Duvall	United States	DF	September 10, 1991 (age 35)	(United States) Portland Timbers
6	Haris Medunjanin	Bosnia and Herzegovina	MF	March 8, 1985 (age 41)	(United States) Philadelphia Union
8	Allan Cruz (DP)	Costa Rica	MF	February 24, 1996 (age 30)	(Costa Rica) C.S. Herediano
11	Luciano Acosta (DP)	Argentina	MF	May 31, 1994 (age 32)	(Mexico) Atlas
15	Kamohelo Mokotjo (INTL)	South Africa	MF	March 11, 1991 (age 35)	(England) Brentford F.C.
21	Kyle Scott	England	MF	December 22, 1997 (age 28)	(England) Newcastle United
24	Jonas Fjeldberg (INTL)	Norway	MF	September 30, 1998 (age 27)	(United States) Dayton Flyers
33	Caleb Stanko	United States	MF	July 26, 1993 (age 33)	(Germany) SC Freiburg
64	Florian Valot	France	MF	February 12, 1993 (age 33)	(United States) New York Red Bulls
7	Yuya Kubo (INTL)	Japan	MF/FW	December 23, 1993 (age 32)	(Belgium) K.A.A. Gent
20	Calvin Harris (INTL, GA)	England	MF/FW	March 20, 2000 (age 26)	(United States) Wake Forest Demon Deacons
31	Álvaro Barreal (INTL)	Argentina	MF/FW	August 17, 2000 (age 26)	(Argentina) Club Atlético Vélez Sarsfield
9	Brenner (DP, INTL)	Brazil	FW	January 16, 2000 (age 26)	(Brazil) São Paulo FC
19	Brandon Vazquez	United States	FW	October 14, 1998 (age 27)	(United States) Atlanta United FC
23	Isaac Atanga (INTL)	Ghana	FW	June 14, 2000 (age 26)	(Denmark) FC Nordsjælland
29	Arquimides Ordonez (HG)	United States	FW	August 5, 2003 (age 23)	(United States) FC Cincinnati Academy

== Player movement ==
=== In ===
Date	Number	Position	Player	Transferred from	Fee/notes	Ref
December 29, 2020	18	DF	(Costa Rica) Rónald Matarrita	(United States) New York City FC	$600,000	
December 30, 2020	17	MF/FW	(United States) Ben Mines	(United States) New York Red Bulls	End-of-year waivers draft	
December 30, 2020	1	GK	(United States) Cody Cropper	(United States) Houston Dynamo	Free transfer	
February 5, 2021	9	FW	(Brazil) Brenner	(Brazil) São Paulo FC	$13 million	
March 17, 2021	11	MF	(Argentina) Luciano Acosta	(Mexico) Atlas	$250,000	
March 31, 2021	23	FW	(Ghana) Isaac Atanga	(Denmark) FC Nordsjælland	Transfer	
April 13, 2021	2	DF	(United States) Edgar Castillo	(United States) Atlanta United FC	Free transfer	
May 7, 2021	25	GK	(Netherlands) Kenneth Vermeer	(United States) Los Angeles FC	Waivers	
May 13, 2021	12	DF	(United States) Geoff Cameron	(England) Queens Park Rangers	Free transfer	
July 2, 2021	29	FW	(United States) Arquimides Ordonez	(United States) FC Cincinnati Academy	Homegrown player	
August 5, 2021	3	DF	(England) Tyler Blackett	(England) Nottingham Forest	Free transfer	
August 5, 2021	64	MF	(France) Florian Valot	(United States) New York Red Bulls	$50,000 (Note: FC Cincinnati will pay $50,000 in allocation money for the 2022 season and an additional $50,000 if certain performance incentives are met)	
August 20, 2021	26	DF	(United States) Chris Duvall	(United States) Portland Timbers	Free transfer	
August 31, 2021	21	MF	(England) Kyle Scott	(England) Newcastle United	Free transfer	

=== Out ===
Date	Number	Position	Player	Transferred to	Fee/notes	Ref
November 9, 2020	1	GK	(United States) Bobby Edwards	(United States) Indy Eleven	Option declined	
November 9, 2020	2	DF	(Costa Rica) Kendall Waston	(Costa Rica) Saprissa	Option declined	
November 9, 2020	4	DF	(United States) Greg Garza		Option declined	
November 9, 2020	11	MF	(Netherlands) Siem de Jong	(Netherlands) SC Heerenveen	Option declined	
November 9, 2020	17	DF	(France) Mathieu Deplagne	(United States) San Antonio FC	Option declined	
November 9, 2020	18	GK	(United States) Spencer Richey	(United States) Seattle Sounders FC	Waived	
November 9, 2020	20	MF	(United States) Jimmy McLaughlin	(United States) Louisville City FC	Option declined	
November 9, 2020	25	MF	(Mexico) Rey Ortiz	(United States) Chattanooga Red Wolves	Option declined	
November 9, 2020	26	MF	(United States) Tommy McCabe	(United States) Orange County SC	Option declined	
November 9, 2020	47	DF	(Cameroon) Hassan Ndam		Option declined	
November 9, 2020	81	FW	(Jamaica) Rashawn Dally	(United States) Memphis 901 FC	Option declined	
November 9, 2020	96	DF	(United States) Andrew Gutman	(United States) Atlanta United FC	Selected in 2020 MLS Re-Entry Draft	
April 13, 2021	12	DF	(United States) Saad Abdul-Salaam	(United States) Columbus Crew SC	Waived	
April 20, 2021	24	MF	(United States) Frankie Amaya	(United States) New York Red Bulls	$950,000 (Note: New York could pay an additional $125,000 in allocation money if certain performance incentives are met)	
July 29, 2021	3	DF	(Sweden) Tom Pettersson	(Norway) Lillestrøm SK	Mutually agreed to part ways	

=== Loans in ===
Number	Position	Player	Loaned from	Loan start date	Loan end date	Ref
10	FW	(Netherlands) Jürgen Locadia	(England) Brighton & Hove Albion	February 3, 2020	June 30, 2021	
21	FW	(Croatia) Franko Kovačević	(Germany) TSG 1899 Hoffenheim II	October 12, 2020	July 28, 2021	
27	DF	(Ecuador) Gustavo Vallecilla	(Ecuador) S.D. Aucas	April 5, 2021	December 31, 2021	

=== Loans out ===
Number	Position	Player	Loaned to	Loan start date	Loan end date	Ref
39	GK	(United States) Ben Lundt	(United States) Phoenix Rising FC	May 6, 2021	End of season	
27	DF	(United States) Avionne Flanagan	(United States) Orange County SC	May 21, 2021	July 5, 2021	
17	MF	(United States) Ben Mines	(United States) Orange County SC	August 16, 2021	End of season	
1	GK	(United States) Cody Cropper	(United States) Memphis 901 FC	August 25, 2021	End of season	

=== 2021 MLS SuperDraft picks ===
Round	Pick #	Player	Position	College	Notes
1	2	(England) Calvin Harris	FW	Wake Forest	
2	29	(United States) Avionne Flanagan	DF	South Florida	
3	54	(Norway) Jonas Fjeldberg	MF	Dayton	From Columbus Crew SC
4	56	(United States) Matthew Vowinkel	FW	Hofstra	

== Competitions ==
Win Draw Loss

=== Preseason ===
March 13 Preseason	FC Cincinnati	0–3	Louisville City FC	Milford, Ohio
1:30 p.m. EST			Thiam 37' (pen.); Ownby 63'; Davis IV 85'	Stadium: Mercy Health Training Center; Attendance: 0
Note: Behind closed-doors

March 27 Preseason	Chicago Fire FC	1–2	FC Cincinnati	Citrus Ridge, Florida
11:30 a.m. EDT	Sekulić 15'	Report	Acosta 35'; Harris 78'	Stadium: ChampionsGate Sports Complex; Attendance: 0
Note: Behind closed-doors

March 31 Preseason	Orlando City SC	1–0	FC Cincinnati	Kissimmee, Florida
7:00 p.m. EDT	Halliday	Report		Stadium: Osceola County Stadium
Note: Behind closed-doors. Second-half shortened by weather.

April 3 Preseason	Minnesota United FC	3–1	FC Cincinnati	Citrus Ridge, Florida
	Reynoso (pen.); Finlay (pen.); McMaster	Report	Brenner (pen.)	Stadium: ChampionsGate Sports Complex

April 7 Preseason	FC Cincinnati	Cancelled	Louisville City FC	Milford, Ohio
		Report		Stadium: Mercy Health Training Center
Note: Cancelled

April 10 Preseason	FC Cincinnati	1–2	Pittsburgh Riverhounds SC	Milford, Ohio
1:30 p.m. EDT	Harris (1st half)	Report	Dikwa (1st half); Griffin 80'	Stadium: Mercy Health Training Center

=== Major League Soccer ===
==== League tables ====
===== Eastern Conference =====
Pos	Team	Pld	W	L	T	GF	GA	GD	Pts	Qualification
10	CF Montréal (Note: Canadian clubs cannot qualify for the 2022 CONCACAF Champions League through the MLS regular season or playoffs.)	34	12	12	10	46	44	+2	46	Qualification for the CONCACAF Champions League (Note: As 2021 Canadian Championship winners)
11	Inter Miami CF	34	12	17	5	36	53	−17	41	
12	Chicago Fire FC	34	9	18	7	36	54	−18	34	
13	Toronto FC	34	6	18	10	39	66	−27	28	
14	FC Cincinnati	34	4	22	8	37	74	−37	20	

Source: MLS
Rules for classification: 1) points; 2) total wins; 3) total goal differential; 4) total goals scored; 5) fewer disciplinary points; 6) away goal differential; 7) away goals scored; 8) home goals differential; 9) home goals scored; 10) coin toss (2 clubs tied) or drawing of lots (≥3 clubs tied)

===== Overall =====
Pos	Team	Pld	W	L	T	GF	GA	GD	Pts
23	FC Dallas	34	7	15	12	47	56	−9	33
24	Austin FC	34	9	21	4	35	56	−21	31
25	Houston Dynamo FC	34	6	16	12	36	54	−18	30
26	Toronto FC	34	6	18	10	39	66	−27	28
27	FC Cincinnati	34	4	22	8	37	74	−37	20

Source: MLS
Rules for classification: 1) points; 2) total wins; 3) total goal differential; 4) total goals scored; 5) fewer disciplinary points; 6) away goal differential; 7) away goals scored; 8) home goals differential; 9) home goals scored; 10) coin toss (2 clubs tied) or drawing of lots (≥3 clubs tied)

==== Results ====
Matchday	1	2	3	4	5	6	7	8	9	10	11	12	13	14	15	16	17	18	19	20	21	22	23	24	25	26	27	28	29	30	31	32	33	34
Stadium	A	A	A	H	A	H	H	A	A	A	H	A	H	A	H	A	H	H	A	A	H	H	A	H	A	A	H	H	H	H	A	H	A	H
Result	D	L	L	L	W	L	L	W	W	D	D	L	D	L	D	D	D	D	L	L	L	W	L	L	L	L	L	L	L	L	L	L	L	L

W = Win; D = Draw; L = Loss

April 17 1	Nashville SC	2–2	FC Cincinnati	Nashville, Tennessee
8:30 p.m. EDT	Muyl (yellow card) 18'; Cádiz 20'; Leal 64'; Johnston (yellow card) 66'	Report	Acosta 8'; Brenner 12' (pen.); Mokotjo (yellow card) 38'; Stanko (yellow card) 77'	Stadium: Nissan Stadium; Referee: Rubiel Vazquez

April 24 2	New York City FC	5–0	FC Cincinnati	New York, New York
1:00 p.m. EDT	Medina 7', 83'; Hagglund 54' (o.g.); Thórarinsson (yellow card) 50', (goal) 57'; Castellanos (yellow card) 60', (goal) 67'	Report	Harris (yellow card) 10'; Cruz (yellow card) 56'	Stadium: Yankee Stadium; Referee: David Gantar

May 1 3	Orlando City SC	3–0	FC Cincinnati	Orlando, Florida
7:30 p.m. EDT	Akindele 1'; Nani 19'; Méndez (yellow card) 26'; Mueller (yellow card) 62'; Urso 80'	Report	Stanko (yellow card) 78'	Stadium: Exploria Stadium; Referee: Drew Fischer

May 16 4	FC Cincinnati	2–3	Inter Miami CF	Cincinnati, Ohio
4:00 p.m. EDT	Matarrita (yellow card) 14'; Harris (yellow card) 40'; Vallecilla (yellow card) 41'; Barreal 59'; Cruz (yellow card) 65'; Cameron (yellow card) 69'; Hagglund 82'	Report	Shea 7'; Guediri (yellow card) 23'; Higuaín 38', 85'; Gregore (yellow card) 88'; González Pírez (yellow card) 88'	Stadium: TQL Stadium; Attendance: 6,000; Referee: Ramy Touchan

May 22 5	CF Montréal	1–2	FC Cincinnati	Fort Lauderdale, Florida
1:00 p.m. EDT	Mihailovic (yellow card) 35' (goal) 56'; Brault-Guillard (yellow card) 43'; Quioto (yellow card) 54'; Wanyama (yellow card) 89'	Report	Locadia 70'; Vallecilla 86'	Stadium: DRV PNK Stadium; Attendance: unknown Referee: Fotis Bazakos

May 29 6	FC Cincinnati	0–1	New England Revolution	Cincinnati, Ohio
3:00 p.m. EDT	Stanko (yellow card) 9'; Kubo (yellow card) 69'	Report	Buchanan (yellow card) 33'; Kessler (yellow card) 66'; Buksa 70'	Stadium: TQL Stadium; Attendance: 11,000; Referee: Dave Gantar

June 19 7	FC Cincinnati	0–2	Colorado Rapids	Cincinnati, Ohio
7:30 p.m. EDT	Brenner (yellow card) 45'; Castillo (yellow card) 45+6'	Report	Rubio 21'; Acosta (yellow card) 23'; Abubakar (yellow card) 45+6'; Price (yellow card) 61'; Lewis 72'; Wilson (yellow card) 90+2'	Stadium: TQL Stadium; Attendance: 25,054; Referee: Baldomero Toledo

June 23 8	Chicago Fire FC	0–1	FC Cincinnati	Chicago, Illinois
8:00 p.m. EDT		Report	Barreal 50', (yellow card) 79'; Vazquez (yellow card) 84'	Stadium: Soldier Field; Attendance: 5,926; Referee: Ismir Pekmic

June 26 9	Toronto FC	0–2	FC Cincinnati	Orlando, Florida
7:00 p.m. EDT	Bradley (yellow card) 33'	Report	Cruz 4', (yellow card) 78'; Kubo (yellow card) 38'; Matarrita (yellow card) 62'; Acosta 68'	Stadium: Exploria Stadium; Attendance: 0 Referee: Rubiel Vazquez

July 3 10	Houston Dynamo FC	1–1	FC Cincinnati	Houston, Texas
8:30 p.m. EDT	Pasher 3'; Figueroa (yellow card) 48'; Valentin (yellow card) 70'; García (yellow card) 81'	Report	Barreal 5'; Kubo (yellow card) 55'	Stadium: BBVA Stadium; Attendance: 20,021; Referee: Marcos de Oliviera

July 9 11	FC Cincinnati	2–2	Columbus Crew SC	Cincinnati, Ohio
7:30 p.m. EDT	Castillo 1', (yellow card) 28'; Acosta 24'; Kubo (yellow card) 32'; Cameron (yellow card) 45+7'; Vallecilla (yellow card) 61'; Barreal (yellow card) 72'; Stanko (yellow card) 88'	Report	Afful (yellow card) 17' (yellow-red card) 42'; Mensah (yellow card) 39'; Zelarayán 45+1'; Berry 77'	Stadium: TQL Stadium; Attendance: 25,701; Referee: Kevin Stott

July 17 12	CF Montréal	5–4	FC Cincinnati	Montreal, Quebec
7:30 p.m. EDT	Toye 21', 72' (pen.); Torres 34'; Waterman (yellow card) 41'; Hafez 74', 87'	Report	Medunjanin 6'; Brenner 14', (yellow card) 45+1', (goal) 46'; Kubo (yellow card) 28'; Vallecilla (yellow card) 31', (goal) 42'; Vermeer (yellow card) 67'; Acosta (yellow card) 84'	Stadium: Saputo Stadium; Referee: Silviu Petrescu

July 21 13	FC Cincinnati	1–1	Atlanta United FC	Cincinnati, Ohio
8:00 p.m. EDT	Gyau (yellow card) 38'; Vallecilla (yellow card) 45+3'; Acosta 61', (yellow card) 86'	Report	Sosa (yellow card) 64'; Hernández 70', (yellow card) 71'	Stadium: TQL Stadium; Attendance: 23,162; Referee: Tori Penso

July 24 14	Nashville SC	3–0	FC Cincinnati	Nashville, Tennessee
8:30 p.m. EDT	Sapong 13', 57', (yellow card) 68'; Leal 35'; Mukhtar (yellow card) 84'	Report	Vallecilla (yellow card) 38'; Cameron (yellow card) 81'	Stadium: Nissan Stadium; Attendance: 23,832; Referee: Guido Gonzales Jr.

July 31 15	FC Cincinnati	0–0	D.C. United	Cincinnati, Ohio
7:30 p.m. EDT	Gyau (yellow card) 36'; Acosta (yellow card) 60'; Hagglund (yellow card) 64'	Report	Moreno (yellow card) 15'; Mora (yellow card) 41' (yellow-red card) 90+2'; Nyeman (red card) 52'; Reyna (yellow card) 72'	Stadium: TQL Stadium; Attendance: 25,060; Referee: Rosendo Mendoza

August 4 16	New York Red Bulls	0–0	FC Cincinnati	Harrison, New Jersey
8:00 p.m. EDT	Tarek (yellow card) 23'; Yearwood (yellow card) 88'	Report	Cruz (yellow card) 32'; Barreal (yellow card) 70'; Kubo (yellow card) 77'	Stadium: Red Bull Arena; Attendance: 9,203; Referee: Jon Freemon

August 7 17	FC Cincinnati	1–1	Orlando City SC	Cincinnati, Ohio
7:30 p.m. EDT	Brenner 42'; Matarrita (yellow card) 53'	Report	Nani 56'; Schlegel (yellow card) 68'; Mueller (yellow card) 77'; DeZart (yellow card) 84'	Stadium: TQL Stadium; Attendance: 24,113; Referee: Fotis Bazakos

August 18 18	FC Cincinnati	0–0	CF Montréal	Cincinnati, Ohio
7:30 p.m. EDT	Cruz (yellow card) 36'; Matarrita (yellow card) 62'; Acosta (yellow card) 89'; Brenner (yellow card) 90+4'	Report	Maciel (yellow card) 22'; Choinière (yellow card) 26'; Camacho (yellow card) 68' (yellow-red card) 74'	Stadium: TQL Stadium; Attendance: 21,115; Referee: Ramy Touchan

August 21 19	New England Revolution	4–1	FC Cincinnati	Foxborough, Massachusetts
8:00 p.m. EDT	Buchanan 7', (yellow card) 73'; Boateng 21'; Buksa 33', 61'; McNamara (yellow card) 68'; Farrell (yellow card) 86'	Report	Brenner 54'	Stadium: Gillette Stadium; Attendance: 18,268; Referee: Fotis Bazakos

August 27 20	Columbus Crew SC	3–2	FC Cincinnati	Columbus, Ohio
6:30 p.m. EDT	Zelarayán 45'; Berry 81', 83'	Report	Matarrita 45+3'; Atanga 74'	Stadium: Lower.com Field; Attendance: 19,949; Referee: Robert Sibiga

September 4 21	FC Cincinnati	0–1	Inter Miami	Cincinnati, Ohio
7:30 p.m. EDT		Report	Shea (yellow card) 18', (goal) 90'; Gregore (yellow card) 62'; Figal (yellow card) 69'; Matuidi (yellow card) 73'	Stadium: TQL Stadium; Attendance: 22,234; Referee: Lukasz Szpala

September 11 22	FC Cincinnati	2–0	Toronto FC	Cincinnati, Ohio
8:00 p.m. EDT	Brenner 39'; Medunjanin (yellow card) 45+3', (goal) 58'; Cameron (yellow card) 50'; Vallecilla (yellow card) 84'; Valot (yellow card) 85'	Report	Morrow (yellow card) 37'	Stadium: TQL Stadium; Attendance: 22,636; Referee: David Gantar

September 15 23	Atlanta United FC	4–0	FC Cincinnati	Atlanta, Georgia
7:00 p.m. EDT	Araújo 5'; Martínez 40', 55'; Adams (yellow card) 73'; Barco 86'; Wolff (yellow card) 90+1'	Report	Brenner (yellow card) 39'; Castillo (yellow card) 45'; Matarrita (yellow card) 54'; Vazquez (yellow card) 79'; Duvall (yellow card) 82'	Stadium: Mercedes-Benz Stadium; Attendance: 42,501; Referee: Drew Fischer

September 18 24	FC Cincinnati	1–2	New York City FC	Cincinnati, Ohio
7:30 p.m. EDT	Brenner 4'; Cameron (yellow card) 48'; Barreal (yellow card) 74', (red card) 85'; Atanga (red card) 90+5'	Report	Tajouri-Shradi (yellow card) 26'; Parks 37'; Castellanos 60' (pen.); Morales (yellow card) 69'; Jasson (yellow card) 77'; Johnson (yellow card) 83'; Callens (yellow card) 90+7'	Stadium: TQL Stadium; Attendance: 21,978; Referee: Ted Unkel

September 25 25	D.C. United	4–2	FC Cincinnati	Washington, D.C.
7:30 p.m. EDT	Arriola 7', 41'; Birnbaum 21'; Hamid (yellow card) 34'; Robertha 72'	Report	Vázquez 80'; Acosta 84'	Stadium: Audi Field; Attendance: 16,069; Referee: Chris Penso

September 29 26	Toronto FC	3–2	FC Cincinnati	Toronto, Ontario
7:00 p.m. EDT	Shaffelburg 48'; Delgado 55'; Achara (yellow card) 59', (goal) 65'; Soteldo (yellow card) 76'; Marshall-Rutty (yellow card) 90'	Report	Valot (yellow card) 32'; Matarrita 38'; Castillo (yellow card) 41'; Vallecilla (yellow card) 59'; Acosta 72'; Stanko (yellow card) 74'	Stadium: BMO Field; Attendance: 5,110; Referee: Silviu Petrescu

October 2 27	FC Cincinnati	0–1	New York Red Bulls	Cincinnati, Ohio
7:30 p.m. EDT	Matarrita (yellow card) 90+1'; Acosta (yellow card) 90+3'	Report	Reyes (yellow card) 52'; Gutman 73'	Stadium: TQL Stadium; Attendance: 22,141; Referee: Timothy Ford

October 9 28	FC Cincinnati	1–2	Philadelphia Union	Cincinnati, Ohio
8:00 p.m. EDT	Castillo (yellow card) 68'; Medunjanin 82'	Report	Przybyłko 45+3'; Aaronson 56'; Freese (yellow card) 80'	Stadium: TQL Stadium; Attendance: 21,674; Referee: Lukasz Szpala

October 16 29	FC Cincinnati	0–1	Orlando City SC	Cincinnati, Ohio
7:30 p.m. EDT	Bailey (yellow card) 80'; Cameron (yellow card) 86'	Report	Urso 13'; Carlos (yellow card) 66'; Perea (yellow card) 74'	Stadium: TQL Stadium; Attendance: 22,488; Referee: Marcos de Olvieira

October 20 30	FC Cincinnati	3–4	Chicago Fire FC	Cincinnati, Ohio
7:30 p.m. EDT	Acosta 28'; Bailey (yellow card) 30'; Vázquez 36'; Gyau (yellow card) 48'; Cameron (yellow card) 80'; Blackett 90+1'	Report	Berić 14', 17'; Kappelhof (yellow card) 45+1'; Medrán 71'; F. Navarro (yellow card) 68'; G. Slonina (yellow card) 79'; Stojanović 90+3'	Stadium: TQL Stadium; Attendance: 21,369; Referee: Jon Freemon

October 23 31	Inter Miami CF	5–1	FC Cincinnati	Fort Lauderdale, Florida
8:00 p.m. EDT	F. Higuaín 6'; Matuidi (yellow card) 47'; G. Higuaín 53'; Vassilev 69'; Morgan 74'; Carranza 85'	Report	Vazquez 21'; Blackett (yellow card) 44'; Cruz (red card) 90+6'	Stadium: DRV PNK Stadium; Attendance: 14,927; Referee: Drew Fischer

October 27 32	FC Cincinnati	3–6	Nashville SC	Cincinnati, Ohio
7:30 p.m. EDT	Romney 6' (o.g.); Brenner 17' (pen.); Vazquez 32'; Cameron (yellow card) 35'; Acosta (yellow card) 70'	Report	Lovitz (yellow card) 21'; Zimmerman 28'; Leal 45+2', 76'; Sapong 71', 90+2'; Loba 80'	Stadium: TQL Stadium; Attendance: 20,581; Referee: Ramy Touchan

October 31 33	Philadelphia Union	2–0	FC Cincinnati	Chester, Pennsylvania
7:30 p.m. EDT	Gazdag 11'; Aaronson 53'	Report		Stadium: Subaru Park; Attendance: 13,488; Referee: Fotis Bazakos

November 7 34	FC Cincinnati	1–2	Atlanta United FC	Cincinnati, Ohio
3:30 p.m. EST	Bailey 21'; Stanko (yellow card) 33'; Matarrita (yellow card) 88'	Report	Hernández (yellow card) 64'; Robinson 70'; Martínez 79'; Araújo (yellow card) 86'	Stadium: TQL Stadium; Attendance: 23,663; Referee: Nima Saghafi

== Statistics ==
=== Appearances and goals ===
Numbers after plus-sign(+) denote appearances as a substitute.

No.	Pos	Nat	Player	Total		MLS		Playoffs	
No.	Pos	Nat	Player	Apps	Goals	Apps	Goals	Apps	Goals
Goalkeepers
1	GK	(United States) USA	Cody Cropper	1	0	1	0	0	0
22	GK	(Poland) POL	Przemysław Tytoń	15	0	14+1	0	0	0
25	GK	(Netherlands) NED	Kenneth Vermeer	19	0	19	0	0	0
Defenders
2	DF	(United States) USA	Edgar Castillo	14	1	12+2	1	0	0
3	DF	(England) ENG	Tyler Blackett	11	1	8+3	1	0	0
5	DF	(Ecuador) ECU	Gustavo Vallecilla	25	2	25	2	0	0
12	DF	(United States) USA	Geoff Cameron	28	0	26+2	0	0	0
14	DF	(United States) USA	Nick Hagglund	24	1	17+7	1	0	0
16	DF	(United States) USA	Zico Bailey	11	1	9+2	1	0	0
26	DF	(United States) USA	Chris Duvall	4	0	0+4	0	0	0
36	DF	(Costa Rica) CRC	Rónald Matarrita	22	2	22	2	0	0
Midfielders
6	MF	(Bosnia and Herzegovina) BIH	Haris Medunjanin	29	3	18+11	3	0	0
7	MF	(Japan) JPN	Yuya Kubo	29	0	29	0	0	0
8	MF	(Costa Rica) CRC	Allan Cruz	22	1	18+4	1	0	0
11	MF	(Argentina) ARG	Luciano Acosta	31	7	30+1	7	0	0
13	DF	(United States) USA	Joe Gyau	21	0	18+3	0	0	0
15	MF	(South Africa) RSA	Kamohelo Mokotjo	13	0	4+9	0	0	0
20	MF	(England) ENG	Calvin Harris	16	0	4+12	0	0	0
21	MF	(England) ENG	Kyle Scott	4	0	1+3	0	0	0
31	MF	(Argentina) ARG	Álvaro Barreal	33	3	26+7	3	0	0
33	MF	(United States) USA	Caleb Stanko	20	0	12+8	0	0	0
64	MF	(France) FRA	Florian Valot	9	0	4+5	0	0	0
Forwards
9	FW	(Brazil) BRA	Brenner	33	8	33	8	0	0
11	FW	(United States) USA	Arquimides Ordonez	4	0	0+4	0	0	0
19	FW	(United States) USA	Brandon Vazquez	31	4	6+25	4	0	0
23	FW	(Ghana) GHA	Isaac Atanga	22	1	12+10	1	0	0
Players who have played for FC Cincinnati this season but have left the club:
3	DF	(Sweden) SWE	Tom Pettersson	4	0	4	0	0	0
10	FW	(Netherlands) NED	Jürgen Locadia	9	1	2+7	1	0	0
21	FW	(Croatia) CRO	Franko Kovačević	3	0	0+3	0	0	0

- Last updated: November 15, 2021
- Source: Team Stats

=== Top scorers ===
Rank	Position	No.	Name	MLS	Playoffs	Total
1	FW	9	(Brazil) Brenner	8	0	8
2	MF	11	(Argentina) Luciano Acosta	7	0	7
3	FW	19	(United States) Brandon Vazquez	4	0	4
4	MF	31	(Argentina) Álvaro Barreal	3	0	3
4	MF	6	(Bosnia and Herzegovina) Haris Medunjanin	3	0	3
6	DF	5	(Ecuador) Gustavo Vallecilla	2	0	2
6	DF	18	(Costa Rica) Ronald Matarrita	2	0	2
8	DF	2	(United States) Edgar Castillo	1	0	1
8	DF	3	(England) Tyler Blackett	1	0	1
8	MF	8	(Costa Rica) Allan Cruz	1	0	1
8	FW	10	(Netherlands) Jurgen Locadia	1	0	1
8	DF	14	(United States) Nick Hagglund	1	0	1
8	DF	16	(United States) Zico Bailey	1	0	1
8	FW	23	(Ghana) Isaac Atanga	1	0	1
Total				37	0	37

- Last updated: November 15, 2021
- Source: Team Stats

=== Top assists ===
Rank	Position	No.	Name	MLS	Playoffs	Total
1	MF	11	(Argentina) Luciano Acosta	10	0	10
2	MF	36	(Costa Rica) Rónald Matarrita	5	0	5
3	DF	12	(United States) Geoff Cameron	3	0	3
3	FW	19	(United States) Brandon Vazquez	3	0	3
3	MF	31	(Argentina) Álvaro Barreal	3	0	3
6	MF	6	(Bosnia and Herzegovina) Haris Medunjanin	2	0	2
6	FW	9	(Brazil) Brenner	2	0	2
6	DF	16	(United States) Zico Bailey	2	0	2
6	FW	23	(Ghana) Isaac Atanga	2	0	2
Total				32	0	32

- Last updated: November 15, 2021
- Source: Team Stats

=== Disciplinary record ===
No.	Pos.	Player	MLS			Playoffs			Total		
No.	Pos.	Player	Booked	(yellow card) (yellow-red card)	Sent off (straight red)	Booked	(yellow card) (yellow-red card)	Sent off (straight red)	Booked	(yellow card) (yellow-red card)	Sent off (straight red)
12	DF	(United States) Geoff Cameron	8	0	0	0	0	0	8	0	0
5	DF	(Ecuador) Gustavo Vallecilla	7	0	0	0	0	0	7	0	0
14	MF	(Costa Rica) Rónald Matarrita	7	0	0	0	0	0	7	0	0
7	MF	(Japan) Yuya Kubo	6	0	0	0	0	0	6	0	0
11	MF	(Argentina) Luciano Acosta	6	0	0	0	0	0	6	0	0
33	MF	(United States) Caleb Stanko	6	0	0	0	0	0	6	0	0
2	DF	(United States) Edgar Castillo	5	0	0	0	0	0	5	0	0
8	MF	(Costa Rica) Allan Cruz	5	0	1	0	0	0	5	0	1
9	FW	(Brazil) Brenner	4	0	0	0	0	0	4	0	0
31	MF	(Argentina) Álvaro Barreal	4	1	0	0	0	0	4	1	0
13	MF	(United States) Joe Gyau	3	0	0	0	0	0	3	0	0
16	DF	(United States) Zico Bailey	2	0	0	0	0	0	2	0	0
19	FW	(United States) Brandon Vazquez	2	0	0	0	0	0	2	0	0
20	MF	(England) Calvin Harris	2	0	0	0	0	0	2	0	0
64	MF	(France) Florian Valot	2	0	0	0	0	0	2	0	0
3	DF	(England) Tyler Blackett	1	0	0	0	0	0	1	0	0
6	MF	(Bosnia and Herzegovina) Haris Medunjanin	1	0	0	0	0	0	1	0	0
14	DF	(United States) Nick Hagglund	1	0	0	0	0	0	1	0	0
15	MF	(South Africa) Kamohelo Mokotjo	1	0	0	0	0	0	1	0	0
25	GK	(Netherlands) Kenneth Vermeer	1	0	0	0	0	0	1	0	0
26	DF	(United States) Chris Duvall	1	0	0	0	0	0	1	0	0
23	FW	(Ghana) Isaac Atanga	0	0	1	0	0	0	0	0	1
Total			75	1	2	0	0	0	75	1	2

- Last updated: November 15, 2021
- Source: Team Stats

=== Clean sheets ===
No.	Name	MLS	Playoffs	Total	Games
25	(Netherlands) Kenneth Vermeer	4	0	4	19
22	(Poland) Przemysław Tytoń	2	0	2	14
1	(United States) Cody Cropper	0	0	0	1

- Last updated: November 15, 2021
- Source: Team Stats

== Awards ==
=== MLS Team of the Week ===
Week	Player	Opponent	Position	Ref
1	(Poland) Przemysław Tytoń	Nashville SC	GK	
1	(Argentina) Luciano Acosta	Nashville SC	Bench	
6	(United States) Geoff Cameron	CF Montréal	DF	
6	(Netherlands) Jaap Stam	CF Montréal	Coach	
9	(Argentina) Luciano Acosta	Chicago Fire FC	Bench	
10	(Argentina) Luciano Acosta	Toronto FC	MF	
12	(Argentina) Luciano Acosta	Columbus Crew	Bench	
13	(Brazil) Brenner	CF Montréal	FW	
14	(Netherlands) Kenneth Vermeer	Atlanta United FC	GK	
24	(Argentina) Luciano Acosta	Toronto FC	MF	
