= Isaac Atanga =

Ghanaian footballer

Personal information
- Date of birth: 14 June 2000 (age 26)
- Place of birth: Nkoranza, Ghana
- Position: Right winger

Team information
- Current team: Þór Akureyri
- Number: 11

Youth career
- Right to Dream
- 2018–2019: Nordsjælland

Senior career*
Years	Team	Apps	(Gls)
2019–2021	Nordsjælland	55	(11)
2021–2023	FC Cincinnati	23	(1)
2022	FC Cincinnati 2	7	(1)
2022–2023	→ Göztepe (loan)	15	(1)
2023–2024	Aalesund	39	(8)
2023–2024	Aalesund 2	5	(0)
2024	→ Ilves (loan)	5	(2)
2025-2026	Kalmar FF	7	(0)
2026-	Þór Akureyri	5	(1)

International career
- Ghana U20
- * Club domestic league appearances and goals as of 10 July 2026

Isaac Atanga (born 14 June 2000) is a Ghanaian professional footballer who plays as a right winger for Icelandic club Þór Akureyri.

== Club career ==
=== FC Nordsjælland ===
Atanga was born in Nkoranza, Ghana and was a part of the academy at Right to Dream and joined FC Nordsjælland in the summer 2018. Since Right to Dream is a cooperative academy to Nordsjælland, Atanga had already played a friendly game for FC Nordsjælland in February 2018 against FC Roskilde.

He made his FC Nordsjælland debut on 14 April 2019, replacing Oliver Antman in the 73rd minute in a 2–1 victory against Esbjerg fB in the Danish Superliga. He played with shirt number 35 on his back. Atanga had had a good season for the U-19 squad before his first team debut, scoring 9 goals in 15 games.

On 14 July 2019, Atanga scored his first professional goal for Nordsjælland in the first game of the season against AC Horsens, a game Nordsjælland won 3–0. He also scored one goal in the following game against FC Midtjylland. On 25 July 2019, the club announced that they had extended Atanga's contract until 2023.

=== FC Cincinnati ===
On 31 March 2021, Atanga joined Major League Soccer side FC Cincinnati, signing a three-year contract. He made his debut for the club on 1 May 2021 against Orlando City, starting in the 3–0 defeat. Atanga scored his first goal for FC Cincinnati on 27 August 2021 against Columbus Crew but couldn't prevent the 3–2 defeat.

=== Later clubs ===
On 7 August 2022 it was confirmed, that Atanga had joined newly relegated Turkish TFF First League club Göztepe on a one-year loan deal with a purchase option.

On 1 April 2023, Atanga signed with Eliteserien side Aalesund for an undisclosed fee. On 17 August 2024, Atanga joined Veikkausliiga club Ilves in Finland on loan for the remainder of the season with an option to buy. However, Ilves did not exercise their option to buy and Atanga returned to Aalesund after just five games and two goals.

On 25 January 2025 it was confirmed that Atanga swapped Norway for Sweden when he signed a 2-year deal with Kalmar FF.

On 26 February 2026 Atanga signed a 3-year contract with Besta deild karla club Þór Akureyri.

== Career statistics ==
As of 25 January 2025

Club	Season	League			National Cup		Continental		Other		Total	
Club	Season	Division	Apps	Goals	Apps	Goals	Apps	Goals	Apps	Goals	Apps	Goals
Nordsjælland	2018–19	Danish Superliga	2	0	—		—		—		2	0
Nordsjælland	2019–20	Danish Superliga	34	7	1	0	—		—		35	7
Nordsjælland	2020–21	Danish Superliga	19	4	2	1	—		—		21	5
Nordsjælland	Total		55	11	3	1	0	0	0	0	58	12
FC Cincinnati	2021	MLS	22	1	0	0	—		—		22	1
FC Cincinnati	2022	MLS	1	0	2	0	—		—		3	0
FC Cincinnati	Total		23	1	2	0	0	0	0	0	25	1
FC Cincinnati 2	2022	MLS Next Pro	7	1	—		—		—		7	1
Göztepe (loan)	2022–23	TFF 1. Lig	15	1	2	1	—		—		17	2
Aalesund	2023	Eliteserien	25	5	2	2	—		—		27	7
Aalesund	2024	1. divisjon	14	3	2	0	—		—		16	3
Aalesund	Total		39	8	4	2	0	0	0	0	43	10
Aalesund 2	2023	2. divisjon	4	0	—		—		—		4	0
Aalesund 2	2024	3. divisjon	1	0	—		—		—		1	0
Aalesund 2	Total		5	0	0	0	0	0	0	0	5	0
Ilves (loan)	2024	Veikkausliiga	5	2	—		—		—		5	2
Kalmar	2025	Superettan	0	0	0	0	—		—		0	0
Career total			149	24	11	4	0	0	0	0	160	28

== Honours ==
Ilves

- Veikkausliiga runner-up: 2024
