= Arquímides Ordóñez =

Guatemalan footballer (born 2003)

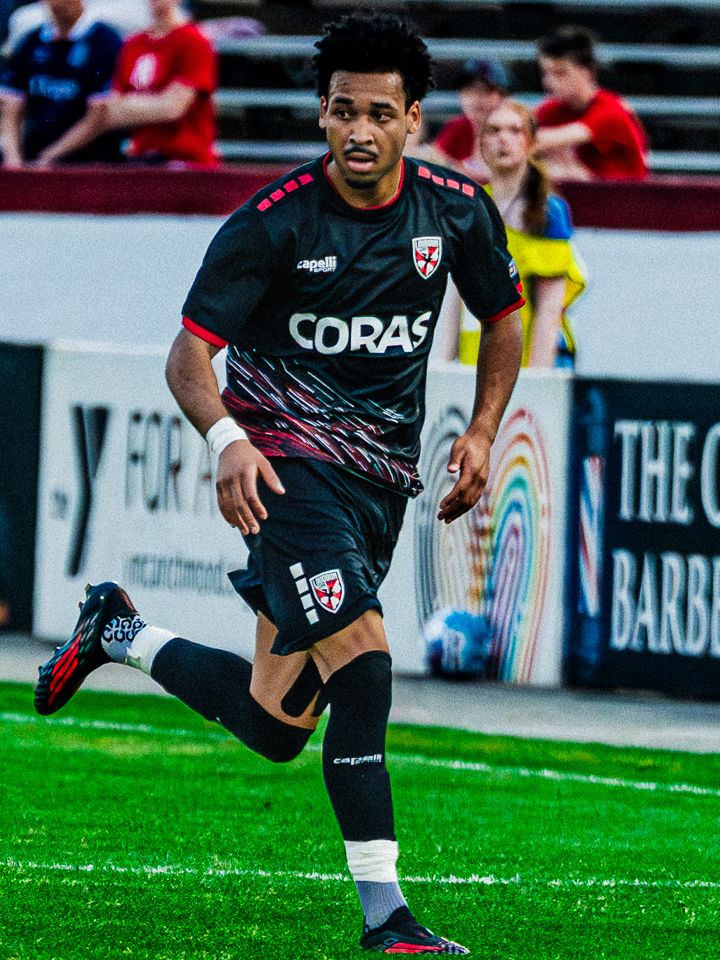
- Ordóñez with Loudoun United in 2026

Personal information
- Full name: Arquímides Rafael Zacarías Ordóñez
- Date of birth: August 5, 2003 (age 23)
- Place of birth: Cincinnati, Ohio, United States
- Height: 1.88 m (6 ft 2 in)
- Position: Forward

Team information
- Current team: FC Tulsa
- Number: 9

Youth career
- 2016–2019: Columbus Crew
- 2019–2021: FC Cincinnati

Senior career*
Years	Team	Apps	(Gls)
2021–2024	FC Cincinnati	26	(1)
2022–2023	FC Cincinnati 2	24	(13)
2024	→ Östersund (loan)	29	(4)
2025	Zimbru Chișinău	8	(6)
2025–2026	Loudoun United	23	(7)
2026–	FC Tulsa	14	(4)

International career^{‡}
2022–2023	Guatemala U20	9	(5)
2022–	Guatemala	12	(1)
- * Club domestic league appearances and goals as of 10 November 2026 ‡ National team caps and goals as of 13 November 2025

Arquímides Rafael Zacarías Ordóñez (born August 5, 2003) is a professional footballer who plays as a forward for USL Championship club FC Tulsa. Born in the United States, he plays for the Guatemala national team.

== Club career ==
=== FC Cincinnati ===
Born in Cincinnati, Ohio, Ordóñez began his career with youth soccer clubs Kings Hammer Academy and Cincinnati United Premier. In 2016, he joined the youth academy at Major League Soccer club Columbus Crew. He stayed with the club until 2019 when he joined the youth squad at FC Cincinnati for their inaugural season as a program.

On July 3, 2021, due to performances with the youth squad, Ordóñez signed a professional homegrown player deal with FC Cincinnati on a three-year deal. He made his competitive debut for the club on July 24, coming on as a substitute in a 3–0 away defeat against Nashville SC.

Ordóñez scored his first career goal for FC Cincinnati in a U.S. Open Cup match versus Louisville City FC on April 26, 2023.

On April 4, 2024, Ordóñez was loaned to Swedish Superettan side Östersund for the remainder of their 2024 season. Östersund would retain an option to make the deal permanent. Cincinnati declined his contract option at the end of the 2024 season.

=== Zimbru Chișinău ===
On February 9, 2025, Ordóñez joined Moldovan Super Liga side Zimbru Chișinău on a free transfer, signing a one-year contract. He scored a hat-trick on his debut for the club against EFA Visoca in a 5–3 victory in the Cupa Moldovei Round of 16.

=== Loudoun United ===
Ordóñez returned to the United States on August 6, 2025, joining USL Championship side Loudoun United on a deal until the end of the 2026 season.

=== FC Tulsa ===
On July 24, 2026, Ordóñez made the move to fellow USL Championship side FC Tulsa.

== International career ==
=== Youth ===
Ordóñez played for the Guatemalan U-20 team at the 2022 CONCACAF U-20 Championship, scoring five goals in six appearances, and was named to the tournament's Best XI for his efforts.

In May 2023 he was named to the U-20 squad for the 2023 FIFA U-20 World Cup.

=== Senior ===
In September 2022, Ordóñez was called up to the Guatemalan senior team ahead of two international friendlies against Colombia and Honduras. He made his debut on September 24 in the first match against Colombia.

== Career statistics ==
=== Club ===
As of matches played until April 20, 2024

Appearances and goals by club, season and competition
Club	Season	League			National cup		Continental		Other		Total	
Club	Season	Division	Apps	Goals	Apps	Goals	Apps	Goals	Apps	Goals	Apps	Goals
FC Cincinnati	2021	Major League Soccer	4	0	—		—		—		4	0
FC Cincinnati	2022	Major League Soccer	8	0	2	0	—		—		10	0
FC Cincinnati	2023	Major League Soccer	8	0	2	1	—		—		10	1
FC Cincinnati	2024	Major League Soccer	0	0	—		2 (Note: Appearances in CONCACAF Champions Cup)	0	—		2	0
FC Cincinnati	Total		20	0	4	1	2	0	0	0	26	1
FC Cincinnati 2	2022	MLS Next Pro	13	4	—		—		—		13	4
FC Cincinnati 2	2023	MLS Next Pro	11	9	—		—		—		11	9
FC Cincinnati 2	Total		24	13	—		—		—		24	14
suburun	2024		12	5	0	0	0	0	0	0	12	3
Career total			46	14	4	1	2	0	0	0	52	15

== Honours ==
FC Cincinnati

- Supporters' Shield: 2023

Individual

- CONCACAF U-20 Championship Best XI: 2022
