= 2022 FC Cincinnati season =

FC Cincinnati
2022 season
- General manager: Chris Albright
- Head coach: Pat Noonan
- Stadium: TQL Stadium
- MLS: Conference: 5th Overall: 10th
- MLS Cup Playoffs: Conference semifinals
- U.S. Open Cup: Round of 32
- Top goalscorer: League: Brenner & Vazquez (18); All: Vazquez (19)
- Highest home attendance: League/All; 25,037 (8/13 v. ATL) (8/27 vs. CLB)
- Lowest home attendance: League: 19,365 (3/19 v. MIA); All: 5,458 (4/19 v. PIT, USOC)
- Average home league attendance: 22,503
- Biggest win: CIN 6–0 SJE (9/10)
- Biggest defeat: ATX 5–0 CIN (2/26)
Home colors	Away colors

The 2022 FC Cincinnati season was the club's fourth season in MLS, and the seventh season playing under the FC Cincinnati brand after three years in the lower-division USL Championship. FC Cincinnati home matches were played at TQL Stadium.

FC Cincinnati's offseason transfers were initially executed by general manager Chris Albright. On December 14, 2021, Pat Noonan was hired as head coach.

== Summary ==
2022 FC Cincinnati defeated Atlanta United FC (2–1) after two late goals by captain and MVP front-runner Luciana Acosta. Then later Vazquez scored the game-winner to clinch a playoff spot in the Audi 2022 MLS Cup playoffs. This led FC Cincinnati to play New York Red Bulls in the opening round beating New York (2–1). A PK was scored by the MVP Luciano Acosta in the seventy-fourth minute to tie the game. Then a goal from leading goal scorer Brandon Vazquez assisted by Sergio Santos in the eighty-sixth minute to win the game. FC advancing to the semi-finals fell short to Philadelphia Union (1–0) with a goal from Leon Flach. FC Cincinnati ended their 2022 season going into the playoffs for the first time in club history. FC Cincinnati's overall record in the 2022 season was 12–13–9 placing 5th in the Eastern Conference. In the 2023 season, FC Cincinnati Is ranked first in MLS with a record of 18-8-4FC Cincinnati started their 2023 season with seven straight wins at home. Making FC Cincinnati the fourth team in MLS to win seven home games since 2000. The winning streak ended on matchday eight, to a defeat from St. Louis City SC (5–1).

== Club ==
=== Roster ===
As of October 10, 2022

No.	Name	Nationality	Position	Date of birth (age)	Previous club
1	Alec Kann	United States	GK	August 8, 1990 (age 35)	(United States) Atlanta United FC
18	Roman Celentano (GA)	United States	GK	September 14, 2000 (age 25)	(United States) Indiana Hoosiers
25	Kenneth Vermeer (INTL)	Netherlands	GK	January 10, 1986 (age 40)	(United States) Los Angeles FC
30	Beckham Sunderland (HG)	United States	GK	June 30, 2003 (age 22)	(United States) FC Cincinnati Academy
2	Alvas Powell	Jamaica	DF	July 18, 1994 (age 31)	(United States) Philadelphia Union
3	John Nelson (GA)	United States	DF	July 11, 1998 (age 27)	(United States) FC Dallas
4	Nick Hagglund	United States	DF	September 14, 1992 (age 33)	(Canada) Toronto FC
16	Zico Bailey (HG)	United States	DF	August 27, 2000 (age 25)	(Denmark) FC Helsingør
20	Geoff Cameron	United States	DF	July 11, 1985 (age 40)	(England) Queens Park Rangers F.C.
21	Matt Miazga	United States	DF	July 19, 1995 (age 30)	(England) Chelsea F.C.
22	Rónald Matarrita	Costa Rica	DF	July 9, 1994 (age 31)	(United States) New York City FC
24	Tyler Blackett (INTL)	England	DF	April 2, 1994 (age 31)	(England) Nottingham Forest
28	Ray Gaddis	United States	DF	January 13, 1990 (age 36)	(United States) Philadelphia Union
32	Ian Murphy	United States	DF	January 16, 2000 (age 26)	(United States) Duke Blue Devils
5	Obinna Nwobodo (INTL, DP)	Nigeria	MF	November 29, 1996 (age 29)	(Turkey) Göztepe S.K.
8	Allan Cruz (DP)	Costa Rica	MF	February 24, 1996 (age 30)	(Costa Rica) C.S. Herediano
10	Luciano Acosta (DP)	Argentina	MF	May 31, 1994 (age 31)	(Mexico) Atlas
31	Álvaro Barreal (INTL)	Argentina	MF	August 17, 2000 (age 25)	(Argentina) Club Atlético Vélez Sarsfield
35	Harrison Robledo (HG)	United States	MF	February 8, 2002 (age 24)	(United States) New York City FC
93	Júnior Moreno	Venezuela	MF	July 20, 1993 (age 32)	(United States) D.C. United
7	Yuya Kubo (INTL, DP)	Japan	FW	December 23, 1993 (age 32)	(Belgium) K.A.A. Gent
9	Brenner (DP)	Brazil	FW	January 16, 2000 (age 26)	(Brazil) São Paulo FC
11	Sérgio Santos	Brazil	FW	September 4, 1994 (age 31)	(United States) Philadelphia Union
12	Calvin Harris (INTL, GA)	England	FW	March 20, 2000 (age 25)	(United States) Wake Forest Demon Deacons
14	Dominique Badji	Senegal	FW	October 16, 1992 (age 33)	(United States) Colorado Rapids
19	Brandon Vazquez	United States	FW	October 14, 1998 (age 27)	(United States) Atlanta United FC
29	Arquimides Ordonez (HG)	United States	FW	August 5, 2003 (age 22)	(United States) FC Cincinnati Academy
33	Nick Markanich	United States	FW	December 26, 1999 (age 26)	(United States) Northern Illinois Huskies

== Player movement ==
=== In ===
Date	Number	Position	Player	Transferred from	Fee/notes	Ref
December 16, 2021	1	GK	(United States) Alec Kann	(United States) Atlanta United FC	Free transfer	
December 17, 2021	2	DF	(Jamaica) Alvas Powell	(United States) Philadelphia Union	Free transfer	
January 4, 2022	14	FW	(Senegal) Dominique Badji	(United States) Colorado Rapids	Free transfer	
January 5, 2022	28	DF	(United States) Ray Gaddis	(United States) Philadelphia Union	Free transfer	
January 6, 2022	3	DF	(United States) John Nelson	(United States) FC Dallas	Stage 2 of the 2021 MLS Re-Entry Draft	
February 25, 2022	93	MF	(Venezuela) Júnior Moreno	(United States) D.C. United	$250,000 in GAM	
February 25, 2022	35	MF	(United States) Harrison Robledo	(United States) New York City FC	$50,000 in GAM	
April 13, 2022	5	MF	(Nigeria) Obinna Nwobodo	(Turkey) Göztepe S.K.	Transfer	
July 8, 2022	11	FW	(Brazil) Sérgio Santos	(United States) Philadelphia Union	$300,000 in GAM (Note: FC Cincinnati will pay an additional $625,000 in conditional general allocation money if certain performance-based metrics or contract conditions are met. Philadelphia Union will receive a percentage of a future trade if Santos is traded to another club within MLS.)	
August 5, 2022	21	DF	(United States) Matt Miazga	(England) Chelsea F.C.	Free transfer	
August 22, 2022	–	GK	(United States) Evan Louro	(United States) Tampa Bay Rowdies	Free transfer	

=== Out ===
Date	Number	Position	Player	Transferred to	Fee/notes	Ref
December 1, 2021	2	DF	(United States) Edgar Castillo		Option declined	
December 1, 2021	4	DF	(Netherlands) Maikel van der Werff	(Netherlands) PEC Zwolle	Contract expired	
December 1, 2021	13	DF	(United States) Joe Gyau	(Sweden) Degerfors IF	Option declined	
December 1, 2021	22	GK	(Poland) Przemysław Tytoń	(Netherlands) AFC Ajax	Option declined	
December 1, 2021	24	MF	(Norway) Jonas Fjeldberg	(United States) Indy Eleven	Option declined	
December 1, 2021	26	DF	(United States) Chris Duvall	(United States) Charleston Battery	Option declined	
December 1, 2021	33	MF	(United States) Caleb Stanko	(Greece) PAS Giannina	Option declined	
December 1, 2021	39	GK	(Germany) Ben Lundt	(United States) Phoenix Rising FC	Option declined	
December 1, 2021	64	MF	(France) Florian Valot	(United States) Miami FC	Contract expired	
January 18, 2022	15	MF	(South Africa) Kamohelo Mokotjo		Contract buyout	
February 2, 2022	21	MF	(England) Kyle Scott	(United States) Orange County SC	Mutually agreed to part ways	
March 28, 2022	5	DF	(Ecuador) Gustavo Vallecilla	(United States) Colorado Rapids	$850,000 in GAM	
August 4, 2022	6	MF	(Bosnia and Herzegovina) Haris Medunjanin	(Netherlands) PEC Zwolle	Mutually agreed to part ways	

=== Loans in ===
Number	Position	Player	Loaned from	Loan start date	Loan end date	Ref
No loans in

=== Loans out ===
Number	Position	Player	Loaned to	Loan start date	Loan end date	Ref
17	MF	(United States) Ben Mines	(United States) Colorado Springs Switchbacks FC	March 8, 2022	End of season	
23	FW	(Ghana) Isaac Atanga	(Turkey) Göztepe S.K.	August 7, 2022	May 2023	

=== 2022 MLS SuperDraft picks ===
Round	Pick #	Player	Position	College	Notes
1	2	(United States) Roman Celentano	GK	Indiana	
1	14	(United States) Ian Murphy	DF	Duke	Pick acquired from LA Galaxy via trade on April 8, 2021
2	30	(United States) Nick Markanich	FW	NIU	

== Competitions ==
Win Draw Loss

=== Preseason ===
January 28 Preseason	FC Cincinnati	3–1	South Florida Bulls	Clearwater, Florida
3:00 p.m. EST	Vazquez 21'; Harris 52' (pen.); Ordonez 90'	Report	80'	Stadium: Walter Campbell Sports Park

February 3 Preseason	FC Cincinnati	1–1	Philadelphia Union	Clearwater, Florida
11:00 a.m. EST	Hagglund (yellow card) 20'; Kubo 38'		Carranza 2'	Stadium: Joe DiMaggio Sports Complex

February 11 Preseason	FC Cincinnati	4–0	St. Louis City SC	Clearwater, Florida
12:00 p.m. EST	Acosta 11' (pen.), 36'; Markanich 63' (Vazquez); Harris (yellow card) 75'; Hagglund 90'	Report		Stadium: Walter Campbell Sports Park

February 15 Preseason	FC Cincinnati	3–2	Nashville SC	Clearwater, Florida
12:00 p.m. EST	Atanga 5' (Harris); Harris 47'; Powell (yellow card) 67'; Robledo 100'	Report	Haakenson 3' (Muyl); Muyl 50'
Note: Extra 30-minute period played after two 45-minute halves.

February 18 Preseason	Orlando City SC	2–2	FC Cincinnati	Orlando, Florida
1:00 p.m. EST	Pato 53'; Akindele 90+2'	Report	Acosta 25', 77'	Stadium: Exploria Stadium

=== Major League Soccer ===
==== League tables ====
===== Eastern Conference =====
Pos	Team	Pld	W	L	T	GF	GA	GD	Pts	Qualification
3	New York City FC	34	16	11	7	57	41	+16	55	MLS Cup First Round
4	New York Red Bulls	34	15	11	8	50	41	+9	53	MLS Cup First Round
5	FC Cincinnati	34	12	9	13	64	56	+8	49	MLS Cup First Round
6	Inter Miami CF	34	14	14	6	47	56	−9	48	MLS Cup First Round
7	Orlando City SC	34	14	14	6	44	53	−9	48	MLS Cup First Round

Source: MLS
Rules for classification: 1) points; 2) total wins; 3) total goal differential; 4) total goals scored; 5) fewer disciplinary points; 6) away goal differential; 7) away goals scored; 8) home goals differential; 9) home goals scored; 10) coin toss (2 clubs tied) or drawing of lots (≥3 clubs tied)

===== Overall =====
Pos	Team	Pld	W	L	T	GF	GA	GD	Pts
8	LA Galaxy	34	14	12	8	58	51	+7	50
9	Nashville SC	34	13	10	11	52	41	+11	50
10	FC Cincinnati	34	12	9	13	64	56	+8	49
11	Minnesota United FC	34	14	14	6	48	51	−3	48
12	Inter Miami CF	34	14	14	6	47	56	−9	48

Source: MLS
Rules for classification: 1) points; 2) total wins; 3) total goal differential; 4) total goals scored; 5) fewer disciplinary points; 6) away goal differential; 7) away goals scored; 8) home goals differential; 9) home goals scored; 10) coin toss (2 clubs tied) or drawing of lots (≥3 clubs tied)

==== Results ====
Matchday	1	2	3	4	5	6	7	8	9	10	11	12	13	14	15	16	17	18	19	20	21	22	23	24	25	26	27	28	29	30	31	32	33	34
Stadium	A	H	A	H	A	H	A	H	A	H	A	A	H	A	A	H	H	A	H	H	A	H	A	H	H	A	H	H	A	H	A	A	H	A
Result	L	L	W	W	L	L	D	L	W	W	W	W	L	L	D	W	D	D	D	D	L	D	D	W	D	D	D	W	D	W	W	D	L	W

W = Win; D = Draw; L = Loss

February 26 1	Austin FC	5–0	FC Cincinnati	Austin, Texas
6:00 p.m. EDT	Domínguez 2', 61'; Ring 14'; Driussi 43'; Kann 90+3' (o.g.)	Report	Cruz (yellow card) 12'; Kubo (yellow card) 76'	Stadium: Q2 Stadium; Attendance: 20,738; Referee: Ismail Elfath

March 5 2	FC Cincinnati	0–1	D.C. United	Cincinnati, Ohio
6:00 p.m. EDT	Blackett (yellow card) 90+4'	Report	Nyeman (red card) 80'; B. Smith (yellow card) 90+1'; Kamara 90+8' (pen.)	Stadium: TQL Stadium; Attendance: 22,183; Referee: Pierre-Luc Lauziere

March 12 3	Orlando City SC	1–2	FC Cincinnati	Orlando, Florida
7:30 p.m. EDT	Urso 42', (yellow card) 73'; Jansson (yellow card) 58'; Carlos (yellow card) 81'	Report	Vazquez 13', (yellow card) 37', (goal) 53'; Blackett (yellow card) 61'; Kubo (yellow card) 63'; Kann (yellow card) 90+2'	Stadium: Exploria Stadium; Attendance: 16,512; Referee: Chris Penso

March 19 4	FC Cincinnati	3–1	Inter Miami CF	Cincinnati, Ohio
1:00 p.m. EDT	Matarrita 18' (yellow card) 33'; Vazquez 24' 82'; Moreno (yellow card) 56'; Kann (yellow card) 90+1'	Report	Higuaín 30' (pen.); Adams (yellow card) 47'; Gregore (yellow card) 53'; Lowe (yellow card) 78'	Stadium: TQL Stadium; Attendance: 19,365; Referee: Ismir Pekmic

March 26 5	Charlotte FC	2–0	FC Cincinnati	Charlotte, North Carolina
6:00 p.m. EDT	Świderski 6' 55'	Report	Badji (yellow card) 75'; Cameron (yellow card) 85'	Stadium: Bank of America Stadium; Attendance: 30,242; Referee: Alex Chilowicz

April 2 6	FC Cincinnati	3–4	CF Montréal	Cincinnati, Ohio
4:00 p.m. EDT	Vazquez 12'; Johnston 20' (o.g.); Gaddis (yellow card) 24'; Powell (yellow card) 28'; Acosta 61' (pen.), (yellow card) 90+4'; Blackett (yellow card) 90+1'	Report	Mihailovic 17', 41'; Kamara 45+1'; J. Torres 67'; Waterman (yellow card) 70'; Breza (yellow card) 88'; Wanyama (yellow card) 90+4'	Stadium: TQL Stadium; Attendance: 20,286; Referee: Tori Penso

April 16 7	Atlanta United FC	0–0	FC Cincinnati	Atlanta, Georgia
6:00 p.m. EDT	Almada (yellow card) 8'; Sejdić (yellow card) 42'; Campbell (yellow card) 84'	Report	Kubo (yellow card) 44'; Hagglund (yellow card) 45' (yellow-red card) 76'; Badji (yellow card) 90+4'	Stadium: Mercedes-Benz Stadium; Attendance: 42,948; Referee: Rubiel Vazquez

April 24 8	FC Cincinnati	1–2	Los Angeles FC	Cincinnati, Ohio
5:00 p.m. EDT	Harris (yellow card) 19'; Acosta 45+3'; Badji (yellow card) 90+4'; Blackett (yellow card) 90+7'		Henry (yellow card) 6'; Ibeagha (yellow card) 33'; Acosta 59'; Vela 79'; Musovski (yellow card) 90+4'; Crépeau (yellow card) 90+7'	Stadium: TQL Stadium; Attendance: 20,883; Referee: Ismail Elfath

April 30 9	Toronto FC	1–2	FC Cincinnati	Toronto, Canada
3:00 p.m. EDT	Jiménez 65'; Achara (yellow card) 86'	Report	Murphy 44'; Powell (yellow card) 50'; Acosta 52'	Stadium: BMO Field; Attendance: 23,591; Referee: Pierre-Luc Lauziere

May 4 10	FC Cincinnati	2–0	Toronto FC	Cincinnati, Ohio
7:30 p.m. EDT	Harris 2'; Acosta 57' (pen.); Nwobodo (yellow card) 59'; Blackett (yellow card) 75'; Barreal (yellow card) 88'	Report	Priso-Mbongue (red card) 6'; Nelson (yellow card) 12'	Stadium: TQL Stadium; Attendance: 19,563; Referee: Lukasz Szpala

May 7 11	Minnesota United FC	0–1	FC Cincinnati	St. Paul, Minnesota
7:00 PM CT		Report	Powell (yellow card) 69'; Cameron (yellow card) 73'; Nwobodo (yellow card) 87'; Vazquez 90+3'	Stadium: Allianz Field; Referee: Marcos de Oliveira

May 14 12	Chicago Fire FC	1–2	FC Cincinnati	Chicago, Illinois
7:00 PM CST	83' Durán	Report	(yellow card) 8' Moreno; (yellow card) 21' Acosta; 33' (o.g.) Rafael Czichos; 85' Acosta	Stadium: Soldier Field; Attendance: 14,049; Referee: Tori Penso

May 21 13	FC Cincinnati	2–3	New England Revolution	Cincinnati, Ohio
6:00 p.m. EDT	Nwobodo (yellow card) 23'; Vazquez 26'; Barreal 58'	Report	Rivera (yellow card) 5'; Lletget 17'; Buksa 43'; McNamara 89'; Boateng (yellow card) 90+3'	Stadium: TQL Stadium; Attendance: 22,844; Referee: Silviu Petrescu

May 28 14	CF Montréal	4–3	FC Cincinnati	Montreal, Canada
7:30 p.m. EDT	Waterman 21', (yellow card) 53'; Quioto 45+4', 59' (pen.); Choinière 46'; Camacho (yellow card) 86'; Hamdi (yellow card) 90'	Report	Moreno 12', 63', (yellow card) 89'; Barreal 52'; Acosta (yellow card) 83'	Stadium: Saputo Stadium; Attendance: 14,225; Referee: Fotis Bazakos

June 18 15	Philadelphia Union	1–1	FC Cincinnati	Chester, Pennsylvania
7:30 p.m. EDT	Bedoya 17'; Burke (yellow card) 64'	Report	Vazquez 39'; Medunjanin (yellow card) 55'; Nwobodo (yellow card) 57'; Hagglund (yellow card) 62'; Nelson (yellow card) 68'	Stadium: Subaru Park; Attendance: 18,717; Referee: Timothy Ford

June 24 16	FC Cincinnati	1–0	Orlando City SC	Cincinnati, Ohio
7:30 p.m. EDT	Brenner 65' (yellow card) 80'	Report	Smith (yellow card) 72'	Stadium: TQL Stadium; Attendance: 24,263; Referee: Guido Gonzales Jr.

June 29 17	FC Cincinnati	4–4	New York City FC	Cincinnati, Ohio
7:30 p.m. EDT	Acosta 15'; Brenner 24', 30', 70', (yellow card) 90'; Nwobodo (yellow card) 57'; Cruz (yellow card) 62'	Report	Haak (yellow card) 31'; Callens (yellow card) 31'; Magno 45'; Héber 45+2', 45+7'; Pereira 52'	Stadium: TQL Stadium; Attendance: 21,258; Referee: Ismir Pekmic

July 3 18	New England Revolution	2–2	FC Cincinnati	Foxborough, Massachusetts
7:30 p.m. EDT	Borrero 30'; Bou (yellow card) 38' (goal) 55'	Report	Kessler 41' (o.g.); Powell (yellow card) 44'; Brenner 73'; Acosta (yellow card) 76'	Stadium: Gillette Stadium; Attendance: 20,193; Referee: Jon Freemon

July 9 19	FC Cincinnati	1–1	New York Red Bulls	Cincinnati, Ohio
7:30 p.m. EDT	Vazquez 20'; Cruz (yellow card) 30' (yellow-red card) 58'; Acosta (red card) 90+3'	Report	Morgan 29' (pen.)	Stadium: TQL Stadium; Attendance: 24,476; Referee: Rosendo Mendoza

July 13 20	FC Cincinnati	2–2	Vancouver Whitecaps FC	Cincinnati, Ohio
8:00 p.m. EDT	Barreal 3'; Vazquez 23'; Nwobodo (yellow card) 52'; Blackett (yellow card) 58'	Report	Gauld 5', (yellow card) 90+3'; Teibert (yellow card) 38'; Dájome 82'	Stadium: TQL Stadium; Attendance: 21,078; Referee: Pierre-Luc Lauziere

July 17 21	Columbus Crew	2–0	FC Cincinnati	Columbus, Ohio
7:30 p.m. EDT	Hernández 16'; Moreira (yellow card) 78'; Zelarayán 86' (pen.)	Report	Hagglund (yellow card) 47'; Nwobodo (yellow card) 84'	Stadium: Lower.com Field; Attendance: 20,741; Referee: Marcos de Oliveira

July 23 22	FC Cincinnati	1–1	Nashville SC	Cincinnati, Ohio
7:30 p.m. EDT	Vazquez 52'; Cameron (yellow card) 73'	Report	Bunbury 6'; Muyl (yellow card) 39'; Lovitz (yellow card) 61'	Stadium: TQL Stadium; Attendance: 23,420; Referee: Chris Penso

July 30 23	Inter Miami CF	4–4	FC Cincinnati	Fort Lauderdale, Florida
8:00 p.m. EDT	Higuaín 23', 37', 45+5' (pen.); Vassilev (yellow card) 60'; McVey 90+7'		Cameron (yellow card) 22'; Brenner 28', 40'; Vazquez 81', 86'; Barreal (yellow card) 90+4'	Stadium: DRV PNK Stadium; Referee: Tori Penso

August 6 24	FC Cincinnati	3–1	Philadelphia Union	Cincinnati, Ohio
7:30 p.m. EDT	Cameron (yellow card) 34'; Vazquez 50'; Acosta (yellow card) 54'; Brenner 55'; Hagglund (yellow card) 66'; Barreal 71'	Report	Aaronson 77'	Stadium: TQL Stadium; Attendance: 23,443; Referee: Drew Fischer

August 13 25	FC Cincinnati	2–2	Atlanta United FC	Cincinnati, Ohio
7:30 p.m. EDT	Barreal (yellow card) 14'; Vazquez 29'; Brenner 41'; Miazga (yellow card) 58'; Blackett (yellow card) 78'	Report	Almada 17'; Wiley (yellow card) 27'; Gutman 83'	Stadium: TQL Stadium; Attendance: 25,037; Referee: Fotis Bazakos

August 20 26	New York Red Bulls	1–1	FC Cincinnati	Harrison, New Jersey
6:00 p.m. EDT	Klimala 23' (pen.); Edelman (yellow card) 85'	Report	Miazga 13', (yellow card) 37'; Nwobodo (yellow card) 66'	Stadium: Red Bull Arena; Attendance: 16,525; Referee: Ismail Elfath

August 27 27	FC Cincinnati	2–2	Columbus Crew	Cincinnati, Ohio
7:30 p.m. EDT	Vazquez 36'; Moreno (yellow card) 40'; Miazga 77'	Report	Degenk (yellow card) 47'; Etienne 74'; Moreira 90+6'	Stadium: TQL Stadium; Attendance: 25,037; Referee: Kevin Stott

September 3 28	FC Cincinnati	2–0	Charlotte FC	Cincinnati, Ohio
7:30 p.m. EDT	Barreal (yellow card) 23'; Hagglund 38'; Acosta 81', (yellow card) 90+2'	Report	Bender (yellow card) 58'; Santos (yellow card) 80'; Reyna (yellow card) 88'	Stadium: TQL Stadium; Attendance: 21,165; Referee: Michael Radchuk

September 7 29	New York City FC	1–1	FC Cincinnati	New York, New York
8:00 p.m. EDT	Pereira 41', (yellow card) 43'; Martins (red card) 75'	Report	Martins 22' (o.g.)	Stadium: Citi Field; Attendance: 14,248; Referee: Ted Unkel

September 10 30	FC Cincinnati	6–0	San Jose Earthquakes	Cincinnati, Ohio
7:30 p.m. EDT	Barreal 45'; Brenner 47', 90', 90+5' (pen.), (yellow card) 90'; Cameron (yellow card) 57'; Acosta 71' (pen.); Kubo 77'	Report	Monteiro (yellow card) 8'; Nathan (yellow card) 46'	Stadium: TQL Stadium; Attendance: 22,557; Referee: Ismir Pekmic

September 17 31	Real Salt Lake	1–2	FC Cincinnati	Sandy, Utah
9:30 p.m. EDT	Chang 35'; Savarino (yellow card) 61'	Report	Hagglund (yellow card) 33'; Brenner 44', 76'	Stadium: Rio Tinto Stadium; Attendance: 20,222; Referee: Chris Penso

September 27 32	Seattle Sounders FC	1–1	FC Cincinnati	Seattle, Washington
10:00 p.m. EDT	Ragen (yellow card) 53'; Montero 58'; Rowe (red card) 69'; Bruin (yellow card) 83'	Report	Brenner 24'; Nwobodo (yellow card) 69'; Acosta (yellow card) 72'	Stadium: Lumen Field; Attendance: 31,291; Referee: Rubiel Vazquez

October 1 33	FC Cincinnati	2–3	Chicago Fire FC	Cincinnati, Ohio
7:30 p.m. EDT	Hagglund (yellow card) 27'; Acosta 78'; Kubo (yellow card) 81'; Vazquez 89'; Santos (red card) 90+5'	Report	Durán 56', 75'; Gutiérrez 59'; Pineda (yellow card) 68'; Czichos (yellow card) 90+4'; Navarro (yellow card) 90+9'	Stadium: TQL Stadium; Attendance: 25,316; Referee: Lukasz Szpala

October 9 34	D.C. United	2–5	FC Cincinnati	Washington, DC
2:30 p.m. EDT	Morrison 26'; Birnbaum (yellow card) 45+2'; Fletcher 46'	Report	Acosta 6'; Brenner 8', 24', 37'; Moreno (yellow card) 30'; Vazquez 53'; Barreal (yellow card) 61'	Stadium: Audi Field; Attendance: 19,325; Referee: Timothy Ford

=== MLS Cup Playoffs ===
October 15 First round	New York Red Bulls	1–2	FC Cincinnati	Harrison, New Jersey
12:00 p.m. EDT	Morgan 48'; Amaya (yellow card) 54'	Report	Miazga (yellow card) 28'; Hagglund (yellow card) 45'; Acosta 74' (pen.); Vazquez 86'; Santos (yellow card) 90+9'; Gaddis (yellow card) 90+13'	Stadium: Red Bull Arena; Attendance: 17,113; Referee: Alex Chilowicz

October 20 Conference semifinals	Philadelphia Union	1–0	FC Cincinnati	Chester, Pennsylvania
8:00 p.m. EDT	Flach 59', (yellow card) 63'; Mbaizo (yellow card) 68'; Martínez (yellow card) 81'; Gazdag (yellow card) 81'	Report	Hagglund (yellow card) 25'; Miazga (yellow card) 58'	Stadium: Subaru Park; Attendance: 19,289; Referee: Timothy Ford

=== U.S. Open Cup ===
April 19 Third Round	FC Cincinnati (Ohio)	2–0 (a.e.t.)	(Pennsylvania) Pittsburgh Riverhounds SC	Cincinnati, Ohio
7:30 p.m. EDT	Barreal 95' (pen.), 99'	Report		Stadium: TQL Stadium; Attendance: 5,458; Referee: Eric Tattersall

May 11 Round of 32	New England Revolution (Massachusetts)	5–1	(Ohio) FC Cincinnati	Foxborough, Massachusetts
7:00 p.m. EDT	Gil 34' (pen.), 37', 53'; Buksa 47', 57'	Report	Barreal 12'	Stadium: Gillette Stadium; Attendance: 2,017; Referee: Lukasz Szpala

=== Leagues Cup ===
September 21 Showcase Match	FC Cincinnati (United States)	3–1	(Mexico) Guadalajara	Cincinnati, Ohio
7:00 p.m. EDT	Kubo 53'; Murphy (yellow card) 59'; Harris 69'; Vazquez 77'	Report	Pérez 20'; Martínez (yellow card) 43'; Sepúlveda (yellow card) 67'	Stadium: TQL Stadium; Attendance: 14,727; Referee: Armando Villarreal (United States)

== Statistics ==
=== Appearances and goals ===
Numbers after plus-sign(+) denote appearances as a substitute.

No.	Pos	Nat	Player	Total		MLS		MLS Cup		USOC	
No.	Pos	Nat	Player	Apps	Goals	Apps	Goals	Apps	Goals	Apps	Goals
Goalkeepers
1	GK	(United States) USA	Alec Kann	7	0	7	0	0	0	0	0
18	GK	(United States) USA	Roman Celentano	30	0	27	0	2	0	1	0
25	GK	(Netherlands) NED	Kenneth Vermeer	1	0	0	0	0	0	1	0
Defenders
2	DF	(Jamaica) JAM	Alvas Powell	32	0	24+4	0	2	0	2	0
3	DF	(United States) USA	John Nelson	25	0	14+10	0	0	0	1	0
4	DF	(United States) USA	Nick Hagglund	36	1	31+1	1	2	0	1+1	0
16	DF	(United States) USA	Zico Bailey	5	0	1+2	0	0	0	2	0
20	DF	(United States) USA	Geoff Cameron	28	0	24+2	0	1	0	1	0
21	DF	(United States) USA	Matt Miazga	12	2	10	2	2	0	0	0
22	DF	(Costa Rica) CRC	Rónald Matarrita	9	1	2+5	1	0+2	0	0	0
24	DF	(England) ENG	Tyler Blackett	21	0	14+6	0	0	0	1	0
28	DF	(United States) USA	Ray Gaddis	24	0	11+12	0	0+1	0	0	0
32	DF	(United States) USA	Ian Murphy	30	1	16+10	1	1+1	0	1+1	0
Midfielders
5	MF	(Nigeria) NGA	Obinna Nwobodo	26	0	23+1	0	2	0	0	0
7	MF	(Japan) JPN	Yuya Kubo	29	1	14+13	1	0+1	0	1	0
8	MF	(Costa Rica) CRC	Allan Cruz	12	0	4+7	0	0	0	1	0
10	MF	(Argentina) ARG	Luciano Acosta	34	11	28+2	10	2	1	1+1	0
31	MF	(Argentina) ARG	Álvaro Barreal	36	8	25+7	5	2	0	2	3
35	MF	(United States) USA	Harrison Robledo	4	0	0+2	0	0	0	2	0
93	MF	(Venezuela) VEN	Júnior Moreno	31	2	25+2	2	2	0	1+1	0
Forwards
9	FW	(Brazil) BRA	Brenner	31	18	22+7	18	2	0	0	0
11	FW	(Brazil) BRA	Sérgio Santos	10	0	0+8	0	0+2	0	0	0
12	FW	(England) ENG	Calvin Harris	9	1	2+6	1	0	0	1	0
14	FW	(Senegal) SEN	Dominique Badji	25	0	13+11	0	0+1	0	0	0
19	FW	(United States) USA	Brandon Vazquez	36	19	32+1	18	2	1	0+1	0
23	FW	(Ghana) GHA	Isaac Atanga	3	0	0+1	0	0	0	2	0
29	FW	(United States) USA	Arquimides Ordonez	10	0	0+8	0	0	0	2	0
33	FW	(United States) USA	Nick Markanich	11	0	1+8	0	0	0	2	0
Players who have played for FC Cincinnati this season but have left the club:
6	MF	(Bosnia and Herzegovina) BIH	Haris Medunjanin	22	0	4+16	0	0	0	2	0

- Last updated: October 21, 2022
- Source: Team Stats

=== Top scorers ===
Rank	Position	No.	Name	MLS	MLS Cup	USOC	Total
1	FW	19	(United States) Brandon Vazquez	18	1	0	19
2	FW	9	(Brazil) Brenner	18	0	0	18
3	MF	10	(Argentina) Luciano Acosta	10	1	0	11
4	MF	31	(Argentina) Álvaro Barreal	5	0	3	8
5	DF	21	(United States) Matt Miazga	2	0	0	2
5	MF	93	(Venezuela) Júnior Moreno	2	0	0	2
7	DF	4	(United States) Nick Hagglund	1	0	0	1
7	MF	7	(Japan) Yuya Kubo	1	0	0	1
7	MF	12	(England) Calvin Harris	1	0	0	1
7	DF	22	(Costa Rica) Rónald Matarrita	1	0	0	1
7	MF	32	(United States) Ian Murphy	1	0	0	1
Total				64	2	3	69

- Last updated: October 21, 2022
- Source: Team Stats

=== Top assists ===
Rank	Position	No.	Name	MLS	MLS Cup	USOC	Total
1	MF	10	(Argentina) Luciano Acosta	19	0	0	19
2	MF	31	(Argentina) Álvaro Barreal	9	0	0	9
3	FW	19	(United States) Brandon Vazquez	8	0	0	8
4	FW	9	(Brazil) Brenner	6	0	0	6
5	DF	2	(Jamaica) Alvas Powell	3	0	1	4
5	MF	7	(Japan) Yuya Kubo	4	0	0	4
7	MF	5	(Nigeria) Obinna Nwobodo	2	1	0	3
7	DF	22	(Costa Rica) Rónald Matarrita	3	0	0	3
9	DF	3	(United States) John Nelson	2	0	0	2
9	DF	4	(United States) Nick Hagglund	2	0	0	2
9	MF	6	(Bosnia and Herzegovina) Haris Medunjanin	1	0	1	2
9	FW	14	(Senegal) Dominique Badji	2	0	0	2
9	DF	24	(England) Tyler Blackett	2	0	0	2
14	MF	8	(Costa Rica) Allan Cruz	1	0	0	1
14	FW	11	(Brazil) Sergio Santos	0	1	0	1
14	FW	12	(England) Calvin Harris	1	0	0	1
14	DF	20	(United States) Geoff Cameron	1	0	0	1
14	DF	20	(United States) Matt Miazga	1	0	0	1
14	MF	93	(Venezuela) Júnior Moreno	1	0	0	1
Total				68	2	2	72

- Last updated: October 21, 2022
- Source: Team Stats

=== Disciplinary record ===
No.	Pos.	Player	MLS			MLS Cup			USOC			Total		
No.	Pos.	Player	Booked	(yellow card) (yellow-red card)	Sent off (straight red)	Booked	(yellow card) (yellow-red card)	Sent off (straight red)	Booked	(yellow card) (yellow-red card)	Sent off (straight red)	Booked	(yellow card) (yellow-red card)	Sent off (straight red)
5	MF	(Nigeria) Obinna Nwobodo	10	0	0	0	0	0	0	0	0	10	0	0
4	DF	(United States) Nick Hagglund	6	1	0	2	0	0	1	0	0	9	1	0
24	DF	(England) Tyler Blackett	8	0	0	0	0	0	0	0	0	8	0	0
10	MF	(Argentina) Luciano Acosta	7	0	1	0	0	0	0	0	0	7	0	1
20	DF	(United States) Geoff Cameron	6	0	0	0	0	0	0	0	0	6	0	0
7	MF	(Japan) Yuya Kubo	5	0	0	0	0	0	0	0	0	5	0	0
31	MF	(Argentina) Álvaro Barreal	5	0	0	0	0	0	0	0	0	5	0	0
93	MF	(Venezuela) Júnior Moreno	5	0	0	0	0	0	0	0	0	5	0	0
2	DF	(Jamaica) Alvas Powell	4	0	0	0	0	0	0	0	0	4	0	0
21	DF	(United States) Matt Miazga	2	0	0	2	0	0	0	0	0	4	0	0
8	MF	(Costa Rica) Allan Cruz	3	1	0	0	0	0	0	0	0	3	1	0
9	FW	(Brazil) Brenner	3	0	0	0	0	0	0	0	0	3	0	0
14	FW	(Senegal) Dominique Badji	3	0	0	0	0	0	0	0	0	3	0	0
1	GK	(United States) Alec Kann	2	0	0	0	0	0	0	0	0	2	0	0
6	MF	(Bosnia and Herzegovina) Haris Medunjanin	1	0	0	0	0	0	1	0	0	2	0	0
28	DF	(United States) Ray Gaddis	1	0	0	1	0	0	0	0	0	2	0	0
3	DF	(United States) John Nelson	1	0	0	0	0	0	0	0	0	1	0	0
12	FW	(England) Calvin Harris	1	0	0	0	0	0	0	0	0	1	0	0
16	DF	(United States) Zico Bailey	0	0	0	0	0	0	1	0	0	1	0	0
19	FW	(United States) Brandon Vazquez	1	0	0	0	0	0	0	0	0	1	0	0
22	DF	(Costa Rica) Rónald Matarrita	1	0	0	0	0	0	0	0	0	1	0	0
11	FW	(Brazil) Sergio Santos	0	0	1	1	0	0	0	0	0	1	0	1
Total			75	2	2	4	0	0	3	0	0	82	2	2

- Last updated: October 21, 2022
- Source: Team Stats

=== Clean sheets ===
No.	Name	MLS	MLS Cup	USOC	Total	Games
18	(United States) Roman Celentano	5	0	1	6	29
1	(United States) Alec Kann	1	0	0	1	7

- Last updated: October 21, 2022
- Source: Team Stats

== Awards ==
=== MLS Team of the Week ===
Week	Player	Opponent	Position	Ref
3	(United States) Brandon Vazquez	Orlando City SC	FW	
3	(United States) Pat Noonan	Orlando City SC	Coach	
4	(United States) Brandon Vazquez	Inter Miami CF	FW	
4	(Costa Rica) Rónald Matarrita	Inter Miami CF	Bench	
8	(United States) Roman Celentano	Los Angeles FC	Bench	
9	(Argentina) Luciano Acosta	Toronto FC	MF	
10	(Argentina) Luciano Acosta	Minnesota United FC	MF	
10	(United States) Roman Celentano	Minnesota United FC	GK	
10	(United States) Pat Noonan	Minnesota United FC	Coach	
11	(Argentina) Luciano Acosta	Chicago Fire FC	Bench	
15	(Nigeria) Obinna Nwobodo	Philadelphia Union	MF	
17	(Brazil) Brenner	New York City FC	FW	
17	(Argentina) Luciano Acosta	New York City FC	Bench	
20	(Brazil) Brenner	New England Revolution	Bench	
23	(United States) Brandon Vazquez	Inter Miami CF	Bench	
24	(Argentina) Álvaro Barreal	Philadelphia Union	DF	
26	(United States) Matt Miazga	New York Red Bulls	DF	
29	(Argentina) Luciano Acosta	Charlotte FC	MF	
29	(United States) Nick Hagglund	Charlotte FC	DF	
30	(Brazil) Brenner	San Jose Earthquakes	FW	
30	(Argentina) Luciano Acosta	San Jose Earthquakes	MF	
32	(Brazil) Brenner	Real Salt Lake	FW	
32	(United States) Roman Celentano	Real Salt Lake	Bench	
34	(Brazil) Brenner	D.C. United	FW	
34	(United States) Brandon Vazquez	D.C. United	Bench	

=== MLS Player of the Week ===
Week	Player	Opponent	Position	Ref
17	(Brazil) Brenner	New York City FC	FW	
30	(Brazil) Brenner	San Jose Earthquakes	FW	
34	(Brazil) Brenner	D.C. United	FW	

=== MLS Player of the Month ===
Month	Player	Stats	Ref
June	(Argentina) Luciano Acosta	3 games played, 1 goal, 3 assists	
September/October	(Brazil) Brenner	5 games played, 9 goals, 2 assists	

=== MLS All-Star ===
Player	Position	Ref
(Argentina) Luciano Acosta	MF	
(United States) Brandon Vazquez	FW	

== See also ==
- 2022 FC Cincinnati 2 season
