= Brenner (footballer, born 2000) =

Brazilian footballer (born 2000)

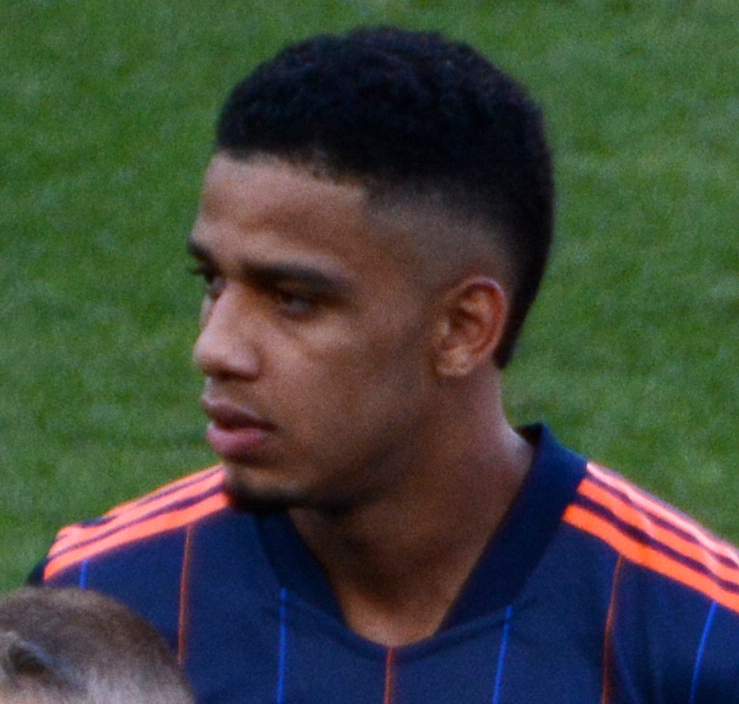
- Brenner with FC Cincinnati in 2022

Personal information
- Full name: Brenner Souza da Silva
- Date of birth: 16 January 2000 (age 26)
- Place of birth: Cuiabá, Brazil
- Height: 1.75 m (5 ft 9 in)
- Position: Forward

Team information
- Current team: Vasco da Gama
- Number: 20

Youth career
- 2011–2017: São Paulo

Senior career*
Years	Team	Apps	(Gls)
2017–2021	São Paulo	38	(13)
2019	→ Fluminense (loan)	5	(0)
2021–2023	FC Cincinnati	70	(27)
2023–2026	Udinese	17	(1)
2025	→ FC Cincinnati (loan)	6	(4)
2026–	Vasco da Gama	13	(1)

International career^{‡}
2015–2017	Brazil U17	11	(4)
- * Club domestic league appearances and goals as of 18:37, 2 June 2026 (UTC) ‡ National team caps and goals as of 13 June 2018

Brenner Souza da Silva (born 16 January 2000), more commonly known as Brenner, is a Brazilian professional footballer who plays as a forward for Campeonato Brasileiro Série A club Vasco da Gama.

== Club career ==
=== São Paulo ===
Born in Cuiabá, Brenner joined the youth academy at São Paulo in 2011. Prior to the 2017 season, Brenner was called into the club's first team by coach Dorival Júnior. He made his senior competitive debut for São Paulo on 21 June 2017 in Série A as a 76th-minute substitute against Athletico Paranaense, São Paulo losing 1–0. Brenner then scored his first professional goal on 3 December 2017, scoring the opening goal in a 1–1 draw against Bahia. He finished his first season, scoring just once in four matches. The next season, Brenner scored one goal in nine matches in the Campeonato Paulista and scored a goal in six matches in Série A, finding himself mainly used as an option off the bench.

On 31 May 2019, Brenner was loaned to fellow Série A side Fluminense. He stated that working with then head coach Fernando Diniz "weighed heavily" on his choice to move to the club. He made his debut for Fluminense on 2 June 2019 against Athletico Paranaense, coming on as a 78th-minute substitute in the 3–0 away defeat. He returned to São Paulo after the season ended, appearing in just six matches without scoring a goal.

==== 2020 season ====
In January 2020, Brenner returned to São Paulo, who were now coached by his former coach at Fluminense, Fernando Diniz. Brenner credited Diniz for encouraging him to return to the club and believing in him despite not finding regular minutes for São Paulo or Fluminense up to that point. On 22 January, he made his first appearance since returning to the club in a 2–0 victory over Água Santa in the Campeonato Paulista. He then scored his first goal of the season in their 1–1 draw against Novorizontino, scoring the equalizer in the 86th minute. In March 2020, the season was paused in the wake of the COVID-19 pandemic. Prior to that, Brenner continued to be used sparingly, unable to breakthrough for São Paulo against first choice forwards, Alexandre Pato and Pablo.

On 26 July 2020, São Paulo made their return to the pitch, with Brenner starting in the 3–1 victory over Guarani. In August, following the departure of Pato, Brenner began finding more chances in Fernando Diniz's team. He scored his first Série A goal of the season in his first league appearance on 30 August, scoring in the 2nd minute of second half stoppage time against Corinthians to win the match 2–1. He then scored the equalizer for São Paulo in their 3–1 home victory over Brenner's former club Fluminense on 6 September 2020. On 17 September 2020, Brenner made his debut in the Copa Libertadores against River Plate, coming on as a substitute in a 2–2 draw. In the following match, on 22 September, he scored his first goal in the competition against Ecuadorian side L.D.U. Quito, scoring in the 60th minute of a 4–2 away defeat.

In October, Brenner broke-through as a starter for São Paulo after original starter, Pablo, scored just one goal from 10 matches. On 7 October 2020, Brenner scored a brace in the club's 3–0 Série A victory over Goianiense before scoring another brace on 14 October in the Copa do Brasil against Fortaleza, drawing 3–3. He continued his amazing scoring run between 20 October and 1 November, scoring in four straight matches, including two braces against Fortaleza in the second leg of the Copa do Brasil and against Argentine club Lanús in the Copa Sudamericana.

On 11 November 2020, Brenner scored a brace against Flamengo, becoming São Paulo's top goalscorer in a season since 2015 with 17 goals in 26 matches at that point. He also developed a goalscoring relationship with new signing Luciano, who had 11 goals at that point, combining to make 28 between him and Brenner, which was also 50% of São Paulo's goals that season. On 3 December, after going four matches without a goal, Brenner scored the second in a 3–0 victory over Goiás, a key result in the Série A title race. After a brace against Botafogo on 9 December and Fluminense on 26 December, Brenner helped São Paulo enter 2021 at the top of the table, seven points ahead of second placed Atlético Mineiro. Unfortunately, in January 2021, Brenner was unable to find the back of the net in six matches, as São Paulo lost four and drew two matches, pushing the club down to fourth in the table. Fernando Diniz would soon be removed as head coach on 1 February 2021.

When Brenner signed with FC Cincinnati, he finished the 2020 season with 22 goals in 44 appearances.

=== FC Cincinnati ===
On 5 February 2021, São Paulo agreed to transfer Brenner to Major League Soccer club FC Cincinnati (FCC). The move was officially announced by FCC on 9 February, with Brenner joining the club as a young designated player for an incoming transfer fee of $13 million, the fourth highest in MLS history.

Brenner made his debut in FCC's opening match away at Nashville SC on 17 April 2021, scoring the team's second goal from the penalty spot in the 12th minute of a 2–2 draw. On 17 July, Brenner scored his first goals from open play, netting a brace in his side's 5–4 away defeat to CF Montréal.

By 2022, for reasons publicly undisclosed, Brenner had become unhappy at Cincinnati and requested a transfer. His request was not met and he remained with FCC for the duration of the 2022 season, leading the team with 18 goals, including 3 hat-tricks, and helping them secure their first ever playoff berth. Brenner still wanted out, however, and reiterated his transfer request in early 2023.

=== Udinese Calcio ===
On 26 April 2023, Brenner was transferred for $10 million to Serie A side Udinese and signed a 5-year contract that will see him with the Italian side through to the 2027–28 season. He remained with Cincinnati until the European summer transfer window opened in July. His final MLS game was on July 1 at home against the New England Revolution.

Due to a hamstring injury, Brenner missed part of his first season with the club. He made his debut for Udinese on 27 January 2024 against Atalanta BC, Udinese losing 2–0.

On 22 August 2025, Brenner was loaned back to FC Cincinnati until the end of the season, with an option to buy. On 15 December, FC Cincinnati announced that Brenner would return to his parent club.

=== Vasco da Gama ===
On January 30, 2026, Brenner joined Campeonato Brasileiro Série A club Vasco da Gama for €5 million on a three-year contract. In a match valid for the 5th round of the Campeonato Carioca, Vasco hosted Madureira at São Januário Stadium and drew 0-0 on February 2, 2026. The game marked Brenner's debut for the Gigante da Colina. Brenner finally broke his drought, finding the back of the net at São Januário for the first time four minutes into the second half. The goal took place in Vasco's 2–0 victory over Botafogo, in the final round of the Campeonato Carioca group stage.

== International career ==
In February 2017, Brenner was included by coach Carlos Amadeu in the Brazil under-17 team for the South American U-17 Championship. On 4 March, he scored the opener in Brazil's 2–0 victory over Argentina. In September 2017, Brenner was included in the Brazil squad for the FIFA U-17 World Cup in India. He scored in Brazil's final group stage match against Niger, his 34th-minute goal helping Brazil win 2–0. In the Round of 16, Brenner scored a brace against Honduras as Brazil won 3–0.

== Career statistics ==
As of match played 27 May 2026

Appearances and goals by club, season and competition
Club	Season	League			State league (Note: Includes Campeonato Paulista and Campeonato Carioca)		National cup (Note: Includes Copa do Brasil and Coppa Italia)		Continental		Other		Total	
Club	Season	Division	Apps	Goals	Apps	Goals	Apps	Goals	Apps	Goals	Apps	Goals	Apps	Goals
São Paulo	2017	Série A	4	1	—		—		—		—		4	1
São Paulo	2018	Série A	6	1	9	1	3	1	1 (Note: Appearance(s) in Copa Sudamericana)	0	—		20	3
São Paulo	2019	Série A	1	0	5	0	—		—		—		6	0
São Paulo	2020	Série A	27	11	5	1	6	6	6 (Note: Four appearances and two goals in Copa Libertadores, two appearances and two goals in Copa Sudamericana)	4	—		44	22
São Paulo	Total		38	13	19	2	9	7	7	4	—		74	26
Fluminense (loan)	2019	Série A	5	0	—		1	0	—		—		6	0
FC Cincinnati	2021	MLS	33	8	—		—		—		—		33	8
FC Cincinnati	2022	MLS	29	18	—		—		—		3 (Note: One appearance in 2022 Leagues Cup Showcase, two appearances in MLS Cup playoffs)	0	32	18
FC Cincinnati	2023	MLS	8	1	—		—		—		—		8	1
FC Cincinnati	Total		70	27	—		—		—		3	0	73	27
Udinese	2023–24	Serie A	8	0	—		—		—		—		8	0
Udinese	2024–25	Serie A	9	1	—		2	1	—		—		11	2
Udinese	Total		17	1	—		2	1	—		—		19	2
FC Cincinnati (loan)	2025	MLS	6	4	—		—		—		4 (Note: Appearances in MLS Cup playoffs)	2	10	6
Vasco da Gama	2026	Série A	13	1	5	1	2	0	4	1	—		24	3
Career total			149	46	24	3	14	8	11	5	7	2	206	64

== Honours ==
Brazil U17

- South American U-17 Championship: 2017
