= Alec Kann =

American soccer player (born 1990)

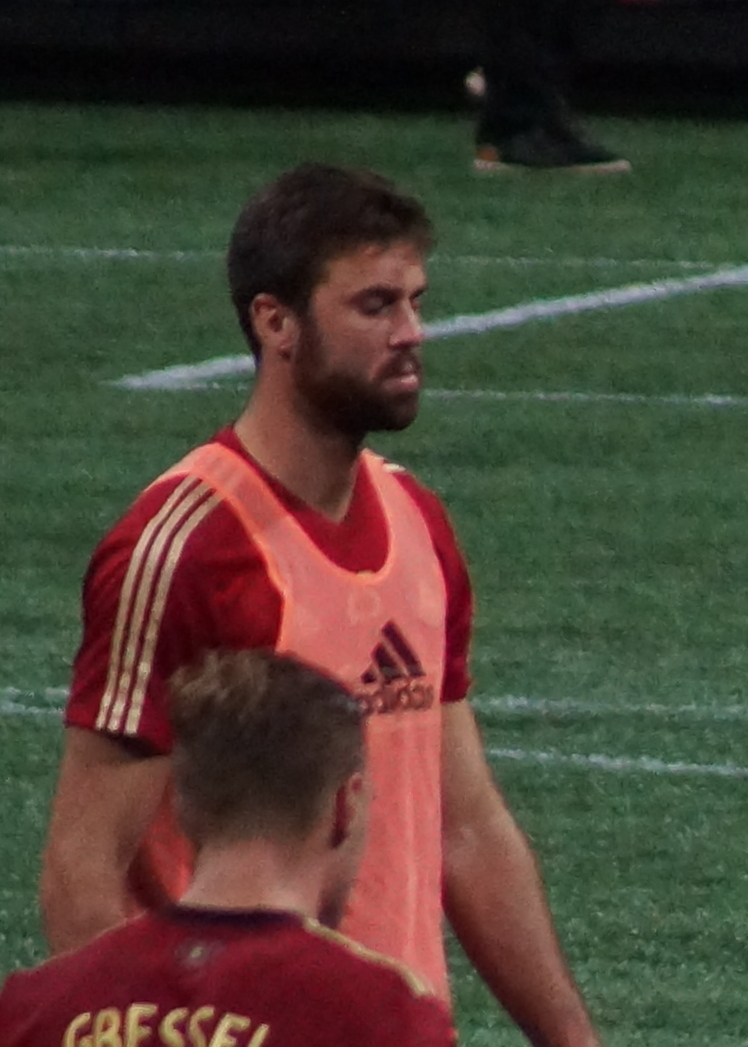
- Kann after an Atlanta United match in 2018

Personal information
- Date of birth: August 8, 1990 (age 36)
- Place of birth: Decatur, Georgia, US
- Height: 6 ft 4 in (1.93 m)
- Position: Goalkeeper

College career
Years	Team	Apps	(Gls)
2008–2011	Furman Paladins		

Senior career*
Years	Team	Apps	(Gls)
2010	Mississippi Brilla	2	(0)
2012	Charleston Battery	0	(0)
2013–2015	Chicago Fire	1	(0)
2014	→ Charlotte Eagles (loan)	17	(0)
2015	→ Saint Louis FC (loan)	18	(0)
2016	Sporting Kansas City	7	(0)
2017–2021	Atlanta United	24	(0)
2017	→ Charleston Battery (loan)	1	(0)
2018–2021	→ Atlanta United 2 (loan)	16	(0)
2022–2025	FC Cincinnati	11	(0)
2022–2024	→ FC Cincinnati 2 (loan)	4	(0)
Total		101	(0)
- * Club domestic league appearances and goals

Alec Kann (born August 8, 1990) is an American former professional soccer player who played as a goalkeeper.

== Career ==
=== Youth and college ===
Kann attended Lakeside High School (DeKalb County, Georgia), where he was a soccer starter for three years, including on the AAAA state title team (20–1–1 record) as a senior. Kann played four years of college soccer at Furman University between 2008 and 2011.

During his college years Kann also played with Mississippi Brilla in the USL Premier Development League during their 2010 season.

=== Professional ===
Kann signed with USL Pro club Charleston Battery on March 23, 2012. He was with the club through their entire 2012 season, but didn't make a first-team appearance.

On March 19, 2013, Kann signed with MLS club Chicago Fire. He was loaned out by Chicago to USL Pro club Charlotte Eagles in June 2014 and to United Soccer League affiliate club Saint Louis FC in March 2015.

Chicago declined the contract option on Kann following the 2015 season. He entered the 2015 MLS Re-Entry Draft and was selected by Sporting Kansas City in stage one.

On December 13, 2016, Atlanta United picked Kann in fifth round of the MLS Expansion Draft.

Following the 2021 season, Kann's contract optioned was declined by Atlanta.

FC Cincinnati opted to sign Kann to a two-year contract on December 16, 2021. On November 26, 2024, the team announced that Kann had retired from professional soccer.

== Personal ==
In addition to playing professionally, Kann coaches through private training to players in North Carolina.

== Career statistics ==
As of match played April 28, 2024

Appearances and goals by club, season and competition
Club	Season	League			National cup (Note: Includes U.S. Open Cup)		League cup (Note: Includes Leagues Cup)		Continental		Other		Total	
Club	Season	Division	Apps	Goals	Apps	Goals	Apps	Goals	Apps	Goals	Apps	Goals	Apps	Goals
Chicago Fire	2013	MLS	—		—		—		—		—		—	
Chicago Fire	2015	MLS	1	0	—		—		—		—		1	0
Chicago Fire	Total		1	0	—		—		—		—		1	0
Charleston Battery (loan)	2014	USL	17	0	—		—		—		—		17	0
Saint Louis FC (loan)	2015	USL	18	0	—		—		—		—		18	0
Sporting Kansas City	2016	MLS	7	0	2	0	—		1 (Note: One appearance in CONCACAF Champions Cup)	0	—		10	0
Atlanta United	2017	MLS	18	0	2	0	—		—		—		20	0
Atlanta United	2018	MLS	1	0	2	0	—		—		—		3	0
Atlanta United	2019	MLS	0	0	1	0	—		—		1 (Note: One appearance in Campeones Cup)	0	2	0
Atlanta United	2020	MLS	0	0	—		—		—		—		0	0
Atlanta United	2021	MLS	5	0	—		—		—		—		5	0
Atlanta United	Total		24	0	5	0	—		—		1	0	30	0
Charleston Battery (loan)	2017	USL	1	0	—		—		—		—		1	0
Atlanta United 2 (loan)	2018	USL	7	0	—		—		—		—		7	0
Atlanta United 2 (loan)	2019	USL Championship	4	0	—		—		—		—		4	0
Atlanta United 2 (loan)	2021	USL Championship	5	0	—		—		—		—		5	0
Atlanta United 2 (loan)	Total		16	0	—		—		—		—		16	0
FC Cincinnati	2022	MLS	7	0	—		1 (Note: One appearance in the 2022 Leagues Cup Showcase)	0	—		—		8	0
FC Cincinnati	2023	MLS	1	0	5	0	3	0	—		—		9	0
FC Cincinnati	2024	MLS	3	0	—		—		—		—		3	0
FC Cincinnati	Total		11	0	5	0	4	0	—		—		20	0
FC Cincinnati 2	2022	MLS Next Pro	2	0	—		—		—		—		2	0
FC Cincinnati 2	2023	MLS Next Pro	1	0	—		—		—		—		1	0
FC Cincinnati 2	2024	MLS Next Pro	1	0	—		—		—		—		1	0
FC Cincinnati 2	Total		4	0	—		—		—		—		4	0
Career total			99	0	12	0	4	0	1	0	1	0	117	0

== Honors ==
Charleston Battery

- USL Championship: 2012

Atlanta United

- MLS Cup: 2018
- Eastern Conference: 2018
- U.S. Open Cup: 2019
- Campeones Cup: 2019

FC Cincinnati

- Supporters' Shield: 2023
