= Geoff Cameron =

American soccer player (born 1985)

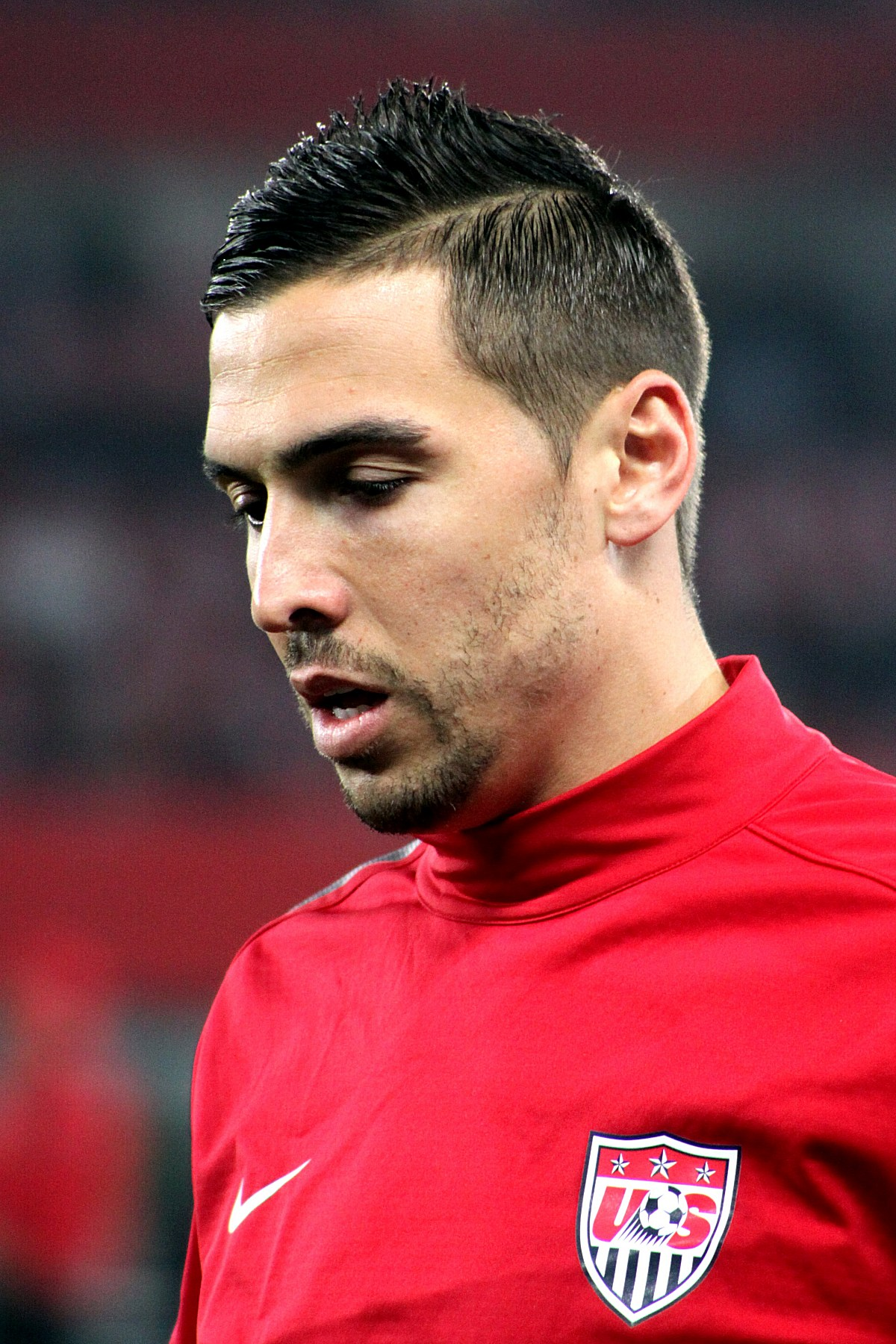
- Cameron with the United States in 2013

Personal information
- Full name: Geoffrey Scott Cameron
- Date of birth: July 11, 1985 (age 41)
- Place of birth: Attleboro, Massachusetts, United States
- Height: 6 ft 3 in (1.91 m)
- Position: Centre-back

College career
Years	Team	Apps	(Gls)
2004–2005	West Virginia Mountaineers	38	(4)
2006–2007	Rhode Island Rams	39	(6)

Senior career*
Years	Team	Apps	(Gls)
2005–2007	Rhode Island Stingrays	33	(8)
2008–2012	Houston Dynamo	116	(11)
2012–2019	Stoke City	168	(2)
2018–2019	→ Queens Park Rangers (loan)	19	(1)
2019–2021	Queens Park Rangers	70	(1)
2021–2022	FC Cincinnati	54	(0)
Total		460	(44)

International career
2010–2017	United States	55	(4)
- * Club domestic league appearances and goals

Geoffrey Scott Cameron (born July 11, 1985) is an American former professional soccer player who played as a centre-back.

Cameron began playing college soccer with the West Virginia Mountaineers and the Rhode Island Rams, as well as USL Premier Development League side Rhode Island Stingrays, before being drafted by Major League Soccer club Houston Dynamo in 2008. After an impressive second season in professional soccer Cameron was named as MLS Best XI in 2009 and helped Houston reach the final of the MLS Cup in 2011 as they lost 1–0 to the LA Galaxy. In July 2012 he joined English Premier League side Stoke City. Cameron spent six seasons with the Potters making 186 appearances before joining Queens Park Rangers in June 2018. Cameron spent three years with QPR before returning to America and joining FC Cincinnati in May 2021.

A full international from 2010 to 2017, Cameron played 55 international games for the United States. He was selected for the 2014 FIFA World Cup and the 2016 Copa América, helping the team to fourth place at the latter.

== Club career ==
=== Early career ===
Cameron was born in Attleboro, Massachusetts and played youth soccer for Bayside United. He attended Attleboro High School and Providence Country Day School before choosing West Virginia University for college. After making 28 starts in two seasons at West Virginia Mountaineers, Cameron transferred to the University of Rhode Island for his junior and senior years. Cameron was an immediate starter and helped the Rhode Island Rams beat the Rutgers Scarlet Knights in the 2006 NCAA tournament, scoring in a shootout. As a senior in 2007, Cameron was named midfielder of the Year in the Atlantic 10 Conference and was a first-team all-Mid Atlantic Region selection. During his college years, Cameron also played for Rhode Island Stingrays in the USL Premier Development League where he played 33 times in two seasons scoring eight goals.

=== Houston Dynamo ===
Cameron was drafted by the Houston Dynamo in the third round (42nd overall) in the 2008 MLS SuperDraft. He made his professional debut on March 29, 2008, coming on as a substitute in a 3–0 defeat against the New England Revolution. In his first home appearance, on April 6, he scored a last-minute goal to help the Dynamo to a 3–3 draw with FC Dallas. He became a regular substitute and sometimes starter for the Dynamo by mid-season.

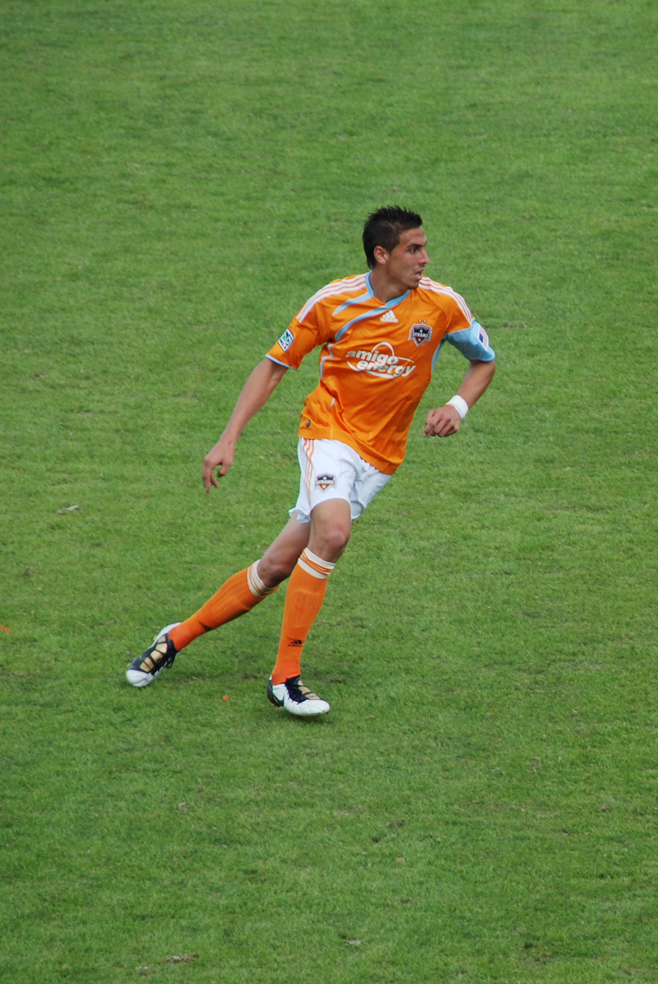
Cameron playing for Houston Dynamo

On October 31, 2008, it was announced that Cameron was a finalist for MLS Rookie of the Year along with Sean Franklin and Kheli Dube. Cameron played a key role for Houston in the CONCACAF Champions League and North American SuperLiga in 2008 and ended his debut season with 32 appearances, as the Dynamo reached the 2008 MLS Cup Playoffs but lost to New York Red Bulls in the semi-final. During the season Cameron also played for the reserves, helping them to win the MLS Reserve League.

Cameron became a regular for Houston in the 2009 season playing mostly at center-back. He missed just one match in the regular season as Houston again made the play-offs. They edged past Seattle Sounders FC 1–0 before losing 2–0 to Los Angeles Galaxy in the Western Conference final. Cameron was selected for the 2009 MLS All-Star Game in Sandy, Utah, and he played all 90 minutes in the 1–1 draw with English Premier League side Everton. Cameron was also named in the MLS Best XI for the 2009 season.

During the 2010 season, Cameron suffered a knee injury that kept him out for half of the season. He returned in August after undergoing knee surgery, and scored a 70th-minute header from a free kick by Brad Davis against D.C. United in the Dynamo's 3–1 win on September 25. His was restricted to 17 appearances in the 2010 season. Houston had a poor campaign and finished in seventh position.

In the 2011 season, Cameron returned to the squad as Houston experienced a much better campaign, qualifying for the play-offs after finishing in second position. After beating Philadelphia Union over two legs, they defeated Sporting Kansas City 2–0 to reach the final of the MLS Cup against the Los Angeles Galaxy. Cameron played the full 90 minutes as Houston lost 1–0. Cameron's performances during the season saw him named in the 2011 MLS All-Star Game against Manchester United where the MLS All-Stars lost 4–0. Cameron played 15 games in the 2012 season before moving to England in the summer of 2012.

=== Stoke City ===
Cameron agreed to join English Premier League club Stoke City on July 25, 2012, with the deal subject to a successful work permit appeal, which was granted on August 8. He played in his first match for Stoke in a 1–1 draw with German side SpVgg Greuther Fürth in a pre-season friendly. He missed the opening match of the season away at Reading due to visa issues. He made his Premier League debut in a 0–0 draw against Arsenal on August 26, 2012. He has impressed since his arrival in England and has begun to play at right back, a position which Cameron is enjoying learning about. He also described playing in the Premier League as "pretty special". Cameron played 38 times for Stoke in 2012–13 as they finished in 13th position in the Premier League. After the season finished Cameron admitted that towards the end of the season he began to struggle with fatigue after playing competitive soccer for 18 straight months.

At the end of the season Tony Pulis left by mutual agreement and was replaced by Mark Hughes. Cameron stated that he wanted to try and impress Hughes at center-back. Cameron remained at right-back and scored his first goal for Stoke on September 22, 2013, in a 3–1 defeat against Arsenal. Cameron continued to be a key player in his attacking full-back role under Hughes and provided an assist for Peter Crouch in a 2–1 win over Aston Villa on December 21, 2013. Cameron scored a rare goal on March 23, 2014, in a 4–1 win at Aston Villa. Cameron played 41 times for Stoke in 2013–14 as they finished in 9th position in the Premier League.

Cameron's start to the 2014–15 season was disrupted by a hernia injury which required surgery. After recovering from his injury Cameron told manager Mark Hughes that he wants to begin playing in midfield. Despite this Cameron continued to compete with Phil Bardsley for the right back position as the season progressed. He was sent-off for the first time in English soccer after conceding a penalty in a 4–1 FA Cup defeat away at Blackburn Rovers in February 2015. Cameron signed a new three-year contract with Stoke on May 24, 2015. Cameron played 31 times for Stoke in 2014–15 as the Potters finished in 9th position for a second season running and they ended the campaign with a 6–1 victory against Liverpool. Cameron played 34 times in 2015–16 as Stoke again finished in ninth position.

Stoke made a poor start to the 2016–17 season, failing to win a match until October with back-to-back wins over Hull City and Sunderland with Cameron impressing in midfield. However, in that Hull match Cameron suffered a knee ligament injury which ruled him out until February 2017. Cameron made 21 appearances in 2016–17, as Stoke finished in 13th position. He signed a two-year contract extension in May 2017. Cameron again made 21 appearances in 2017–18 as Stoke suffered relegation to the EFL Championship.

=== Queens Park Rangers ===
Cameron joined Queens Park Rangers on loan for the 2018–19 season after not being part of Gary Rowett's plans. Cameron played 19 times for Rangers scoring once in a 1–1 draw against Derby County on October 6, 2018. Cameron made his move to Queens Park Rangers permanent on July 25, 2019.

Cameron was named captain of QPR ahead of the 2020–21 season. On May 5, 2021, he announced he would depart the club and return to the United States after making 90 appearances and scoring twice for QPR.

=== FC Cincinnati ===
On May 13, 2021, Cameron returned to Major League Soccer and signed with FC Cincinnati on contract through the 2022 season with an additional option year. He made his debut for the club on May 16 against Inter Miami CF, starting in the 3–2 defeat. Cameron was released by Cincinnati following their 2022 season. He announced his retirement from soccer in May 2023.

== International career ==
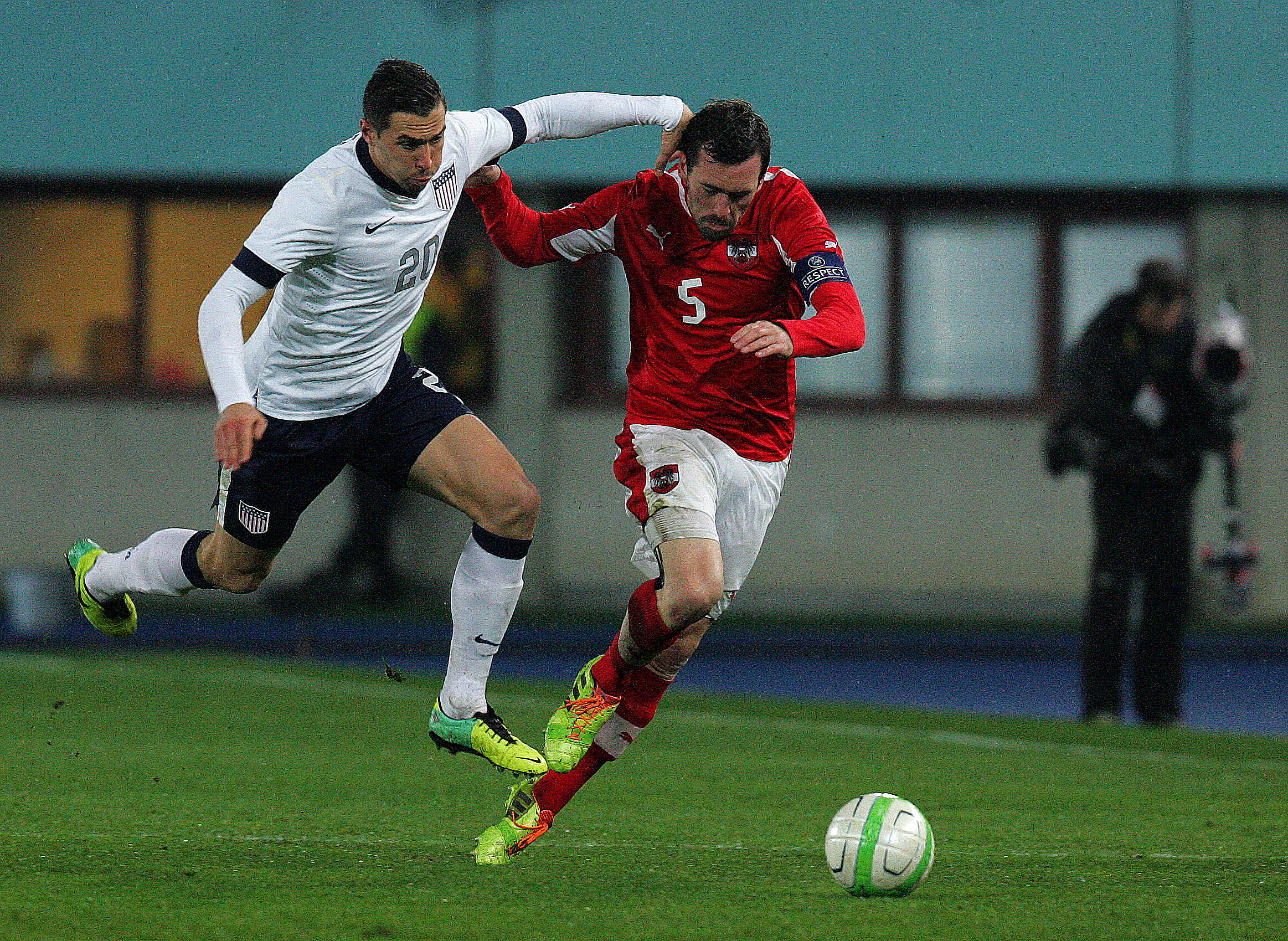
Cameron (left) playing for the United States in 2013

Cameron received his first call up to train with the senior United States national team in January 2009, but he was injured during the first week and was unable to play in the team's friendly against Sweden. He participated again in training with the team in Carson, California in January 2010, leading up to a friendly match against Honduras. Cameron did not play in that match, but he was again called into camp for the February 24, 2010, game against El Salvador in Tampa, Florida. He appeared as a substitute in the 86th minute for Robbie Rogers, recording his first cap for the national side, nearly scoring on a blazing strike that narrowly went over the bar. In December 2011, Cameron was called up to coach Jürgen Klinsmann's camp. On January 21, 2012, he went 90 minutes in a friendly against Venezuela. Cameron scored his goal for the national team on May 29 in a 4–2 defeat against Belgium.

Cameron was a part of the national team during the 2014 FIFA World Cup. He was the first player from Massachusetts to play at the tournament since Mike Burns in 1998. He started as central defender during the team's first two group stage games against Ghana and Portugal. He was benched and replaced by Omar Gonzalez for the third game against Germany. In the Round of 16 defeat against Belgium, Cameron started in central midfield in place of Kyle Beckerman. NBC Sports interpreted that Klinsmann made the change as Cameron was better suited to take on Marouane Fellaini, a tall Belgian midfielder with a noted heading ability.

Cameron was not chosen for the 2015 CONCACAF Gold Cup, with reports saying that Stoke wanted him for preseason. On October 10 that year, he scored in a 3–2 loss to Mexico in the CONCACAF Cup, a one-off event to decide the confederation's entrant to the 2017 FIFA Confederations Cup. Cameron started in every game at the Copa América Centenario in central defense alongside Hertha BSC's John Brooks, as the team finished in fourth place in 2016.

== Style of play ==
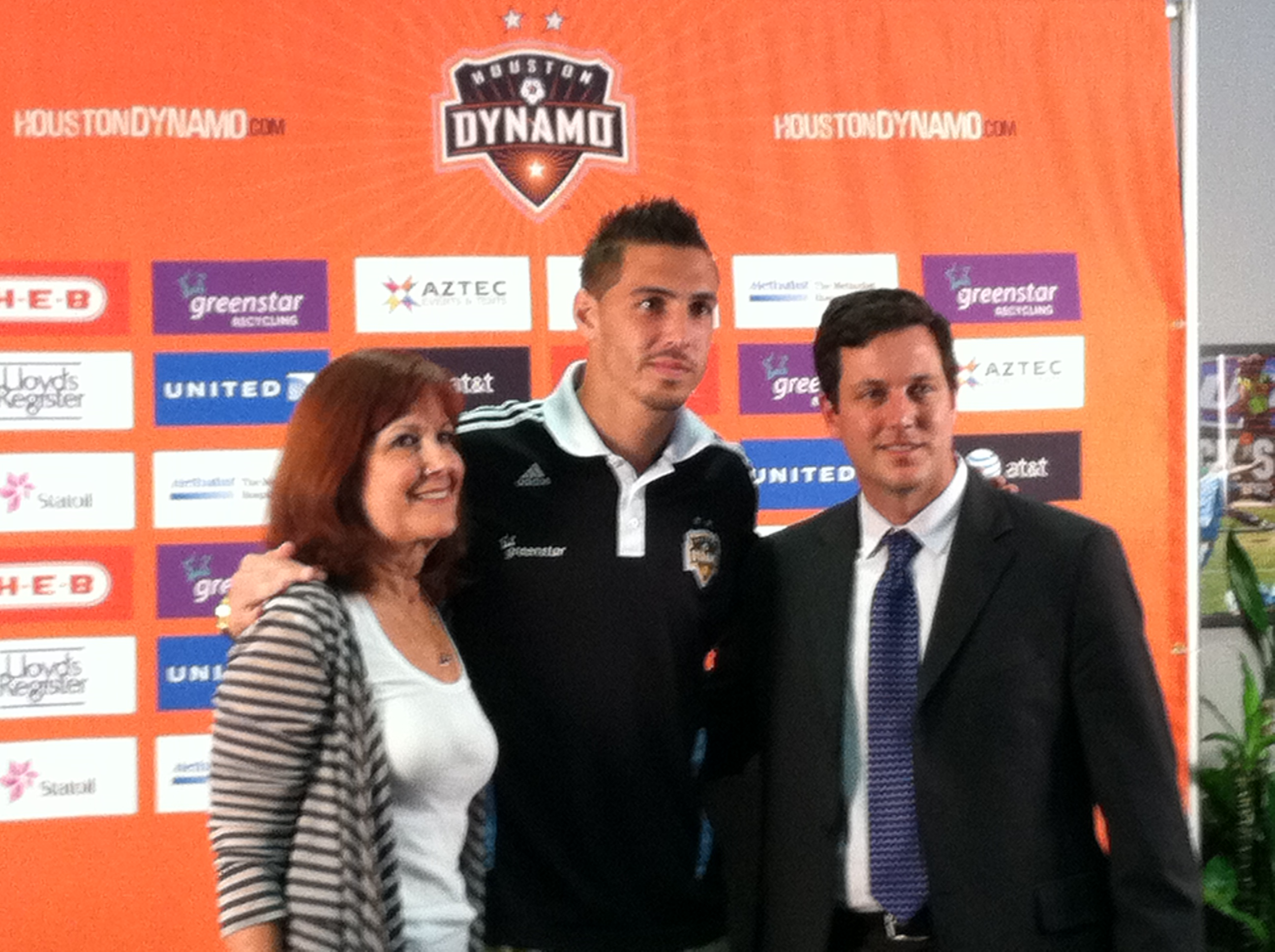
Cameron (center) at the announcement of the 20 for 20 campaign in 2011.

A versatile player who had been chiefly featured at centre-back but could also play as a right-back or defensive midfielder, Cameron was known for his aerial ability, strength, athleticism and composure on the ball.

Geoff has the mentality and all the skill-sets to succeed . . . Stoke and England are getting a quality player that they can be excited to see. He's good with the ball, he reads the game well and he's not going to lose possession of the ball while under pressure. If you're playing with Geoff Cameron, be prepared to play with the ball. He has the physical attributes to bang when he needs to but he also has a real confidence in the way he handles the ball and the way he passes out of the back.

— Former U.S. international and ESPN pundit Alexi Lalas speaks highly of Geoff Cameron.

== Personal life ==
Cameron's father Scott was a professional hockey player, after having played for Mount Saint Charles Academy, a school that dominated the sport in Rhode Island.

During his time at Houston Dynamo, Cameron took part in a series of community service efforts to raise money for local charitable organizations in 2011 and 2012. The 20 for 20 campaign was started in September 2011 when Cameron, who wore the No. 20 jersey in Houston, announced a goal to raise a total of $20,000 for the Fisher House and Ronald McDonald House of Houston. In March 2012, Cameron and the Dynamo announced the return of the 20 for 20 campaign with the same initial goal of $20,000, with proceeds going to the Leukemia & Lymphoma Society. Growing up Cameron supported English side Manchester United and Italian side Juventus. While living in England Cameron participated in local community work.

Cameron endorsed Donald Trump in the 2016 United States presidential election and claimed he had political arguments with USMNT teammates, who he said were mostly liberal. He was one of the few sportspeople who expressed support for Trump's Executive Order 13769, which put a 90-day immigration freeze on several nations and suspended activity on the United States Refugee Admissions Program.

== Career statistics ==
=== Club ===
Appearances and goals by club, season and competition
Club	Season	League			Playoffs		National cup (Note: Includes U.S. Open Cup and FA Cup)		League cup (Note: Includes EFL Cup and Leagues Cup)		Continental		Total	
Club	Season	Division	Apps	Goals	Apps	Goals	Apps	Goals	Apps	Goals	Apps	Goals	Apps	Goals
Rhode Island Stingrays	2005	USL PDL	13	4	—		—		—		—		13	4
Rhode Island Stingrays	2006	USL PDL	16	4	—		—		—		—		16	4
Rhode Island Stingrays	2007	USL PDL	4	0	—		—		—		—		4	0
Rhode Island Stingrays	Total		33	8	—		—		—		—		33	8
Houston Dynamo	2008	Major League Soccer	23	1	1	0	1	0	—		11 (Note: Two appearances in the CONCACAF Champions' Cup, four appearances in CONCACAF Champions League, and five appearances in North American SuperLiga)	0	36	1
Houston Dynamo	2009	Major League Soccer	29	2	3	0	2	2	—		7 (Note: Two appearances in 2008–09 CONCACAF Champions League and five appearances and one goal in 2009–10 CONCACAF Champions League)	1	41	5
Houston Dynamo	2010	Major League Soccer	16	3	—		—		—		1 (Note: Appearance in North American SuperLiga)	0	17	3
Houston Dynamo	2011	Major League Soccer	33	5	4	0	—		—		—		37	5
Houston Dynamo	2012	Major League Soccer	15	0	—		—		—		—		15	0
Houston Dynamo	Total		116	11	8	0	3	2	—		19	1	146	14
Stoke City	2012–13	Premier League	35	0	—		2	0	1	0	—		38	0
Stoke City	2013–14	Premier League	37	2	—		2	0	2	0	—		41	2
Stoke City	2014–15	Premier League	27	0	—		2	0	2	0	—		31	0
Stoke City	2015–16	Premier League	30	0	—		—		4	0	—		34	0
Stoke City	2016–17	Premier League	19	0	—		—		2	0	—		21	0
Stoke City	2017–18	Premier League	20	0	—		1	0	—		—		21	0
Stoke City	Total		168	2	—		7	0	11	0	—		186	2
Queens Park Rangers (loan)	2018–19	Championship	19	1	—		—		—		—		19	1
Queens Park Rangers	2019–20	Championship	36	1	—		1	0	—		—		37	1
Queens Park Rangers	2020–21	Championship	34	0	—		1	0	—		—		35	0
Queens Park Rangers	Total		89	2	—		2	0	—		—		91	2
FC Cincinnati	2021	Major League Soccer	28	0	—		—		—		—		28	0
FC Cincinnati	2022	Major League Soccer	26	0	1	0	1	0	1 (Note: One appearance in the 2022 Leagues Cup Showcase)	0	—		29	0
FC Cincinnati	Total		54	0	1	0	1	0	1	0	—		57	0
Career total			460	23	9	0	13	2	12	0	19	1	513	26

=== International ===
Appearances and goals by national team and year
National team	Year	Apps	Goals
United States
United States	2010	1	0
United States	2011	0	0
United States	2012	10	0
United States	2013	12	1
United States	2014	8	0
United States	2015	6	2
United States	2016	12	1
United States	2017	6	0
Total		55	4

International goals by date, venue, cap, opponent, score, result and competition
No.	Date	Venue	Opponent	Score	Result	Competition	Ref
1.	May 29, 2013	FirstEnergy Stadium, Cleveland, Ohio	Belgium	1–1	2–4	Friendly	
2.	October 10, 2015	Rose Bowl, Pasadena, California	Mexico	1–1	2–3	2015 CONCACAF Cup	
3.	November 13, 2015	Busch Stadium, St. Louis, Missouri	Saint Vincent and the Grenadines	4–1	6–1	2018 FIFA World Cup qualification	
4.	March 29, 2016	Mapfre Stadium, Columbus, Ohio	Guatemala	2–0	4–0	2018 FIFA World Cup qualification	

== Honors ==
Houston Dynamo

- MLS Cup runner-up: 2011
- Major League Soccer Eastern Conference Champion: 2011

Individual

- Atlantic 10 Conference Midfielder of the Year: 2007
- Dynamo Newcomer of the Year: 2008
- MLS Best XI: 2009
- Dynamo Defender of the Year: 2009
- Major League Soccer All-Star Game: 2009, 2011
