= Brandon Vázquez =

American soccer player (born 1998)

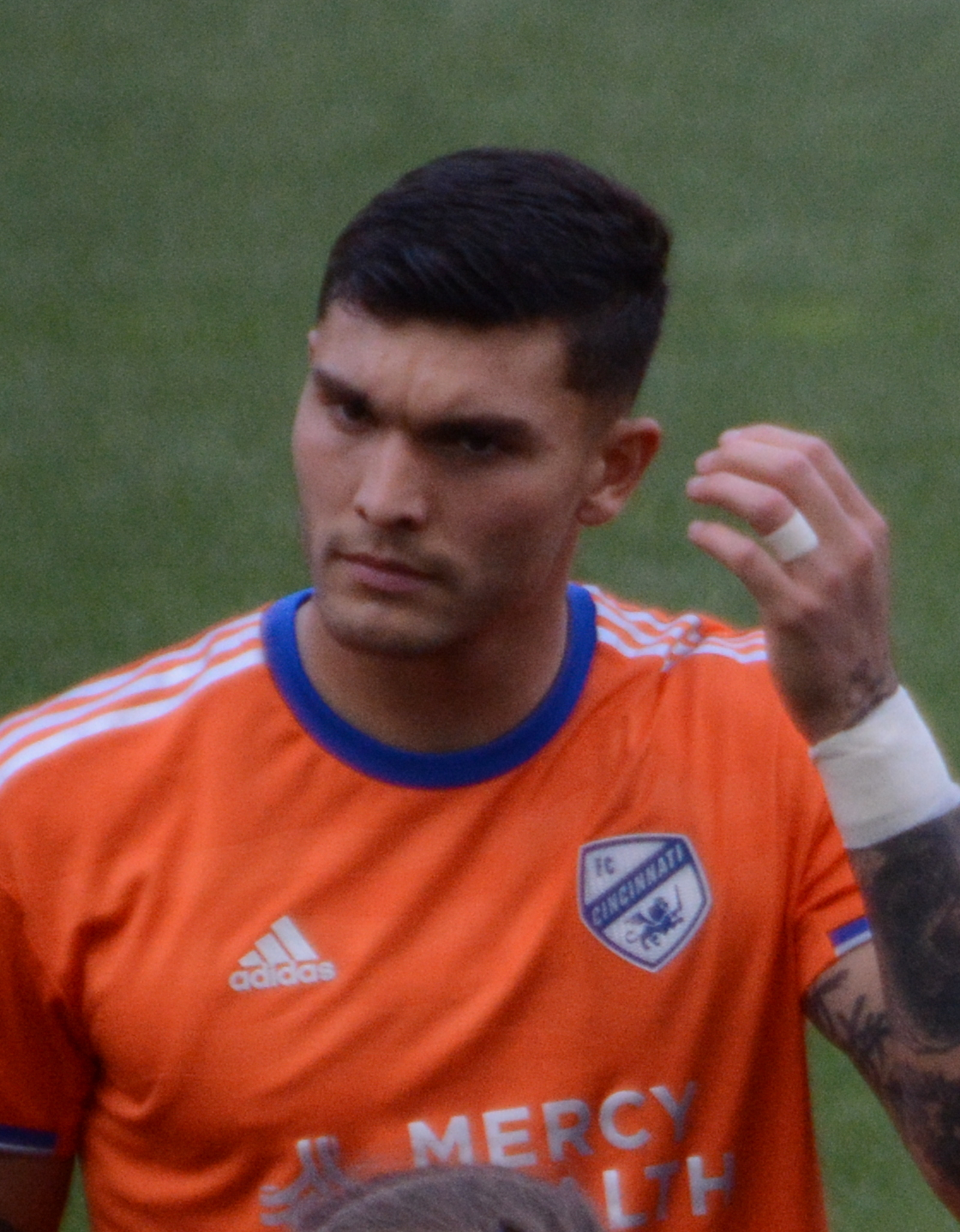
- Vázquez with FC Cincinnati in 2023

Personal information
- Full name: Brandon Vázquez Toledo
- Date of birth: October 14, 1998 (age 28)
- Place of birth: Chula Vista, California, U.S.
- Height: 6 ft 2 in (1.88 m)
- Position: Forward

Team information
- Current team: Austin FC
- Number: 9

Youth career
- 2013–2016: Tijuana

Senior career*
Years	Team	Apps	(Gls)
2016	Tijuana	0	(0)
2017–2019	Atlanta United	32	(3)
2018–2019	Atlanta United 2	12	(5)
2020–2023	FC Cincinnati	112	(32)
2024	Monterrey	40	(10)
2025–	Austin FC	41	(8)

International career^{‡}
2014–2015	United States U17	15	(6)
2016	United States U19	7	(1)
2016	United States U20	4	(1)
2023–	United States	11	(4)
- * Club domestic league appearances and goals as of 21:37, November 8, 2026 (UTC) ‡ National team caps and goals as of November 18, 2024

Brandon Vázquez Toledo (born October 14, 1998) is an American professional soccer player who plays as a forward for Major League Soccer club Austin FC and the United States national team.

== Club career ==
=== Atlanta United ===
Vázquez signed with Major League Soccer expansion club Atlanta United in December 2016 ahead of their inaugural season.

On April 22, 2017, Vázquez played in his first competitive MLS match, coming on as a substitute against Real Salt Lake and scoring a goal in the final minute of stoppage time.

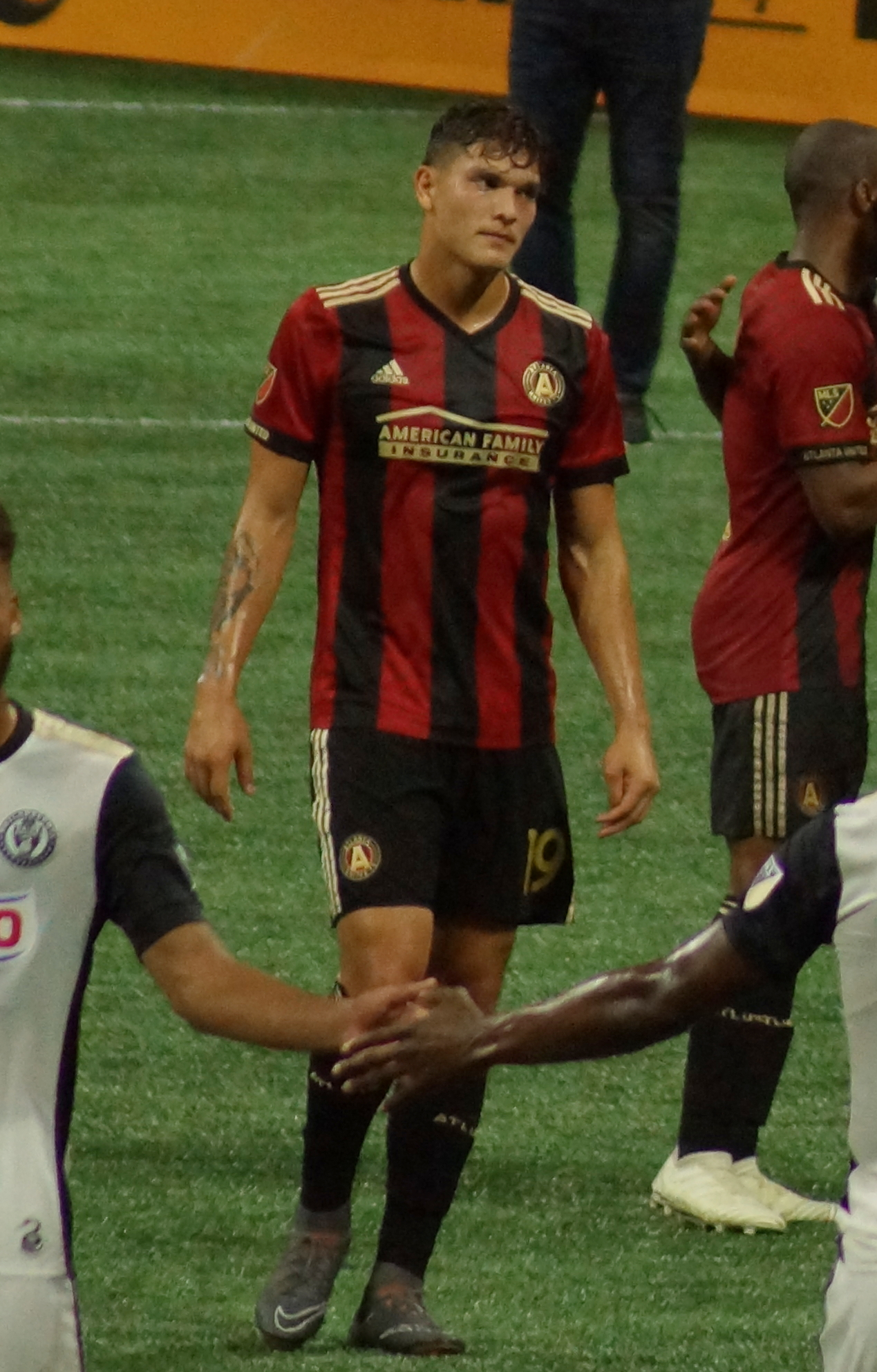
Vázquez after an Atlanta United game on June 2, 2018

In his first two seasons with the club, under manager Tata Martino, Vázquez was deployed as a winger rather than his natural position of leading the line as a striker. As a reserve, Vázquez made 21 appearances and scored one goal over those two seasons, culminating with Atlanta winning the MLS Cup title in 2018.

After scoring 4 goals in his previous 2 games, Vázquez earned his first MLS Start on June 26, 2019, in a 2–3 defeat to Toronto FC.

=== FC Cincinnati ===
On November 19, 2019, Vázquez was selected by Nashville SC in the 2019 MLS Expansion Draft. He was subsequently traded to FC Cincinnati in exchange for $150,000 in Targeted Allocation Money.

After mainly appearing as a substitute, Vázquez made his breakthrough in the 2022 season. He opened the season as the undisputed starter for the first time in his career. After two poor results, Cincinnati took down Orlando City SC with a 2–1 victory on the strength of his brace. The first goal was a well-taken finish after a perfectly timed cutting run between the centre-backs, the second a redirected header off a cross. The following week, Vázquez registered another brace and added an assist in a 3–1 win over Inter Miami. In the 24th minute, he rose to win a cross, beating the defenders and goalkeeper to the ball. His insurance goal, another header, sealed back-to-back victories for Cincinnati. Brandon Vazquez has already set the record for the most goals in a single season in FC Cincinnati history. On August 3, Vázquez was selected for the 2022 MLS All-Star game as a replacement for striker Valentín Castellanos who was loaned by NYCFC to LaLiga side Girona FC after making the original 2022 roster. Vázquez became the second FC Cincinnati player to ever be selected for an MLS All-Star roster, after attacking-midfielder teammate Luciano Acosta had already been chosen for the 2022 matchup against Liga MX All-Stars.

=== Monterrey ===
On January 10, 2024, Vázquez joined Liga MX club Monterrey on a four-year deal. On March 7, he scored against his former club, FC Cincinnati, in the CONCACAF Champions Cup.

=== Austin FC ===
On January 6, 2025, Vázquez returned to the United States, joining Austin FC on a four-year deal for a club record transfer fee. The transfer fee was reported to be between $6 million and $10 million.

Vázquez scored five goals in MLS, as well as four goals in the U.S. Open Cup, in 2025. He sustained a torn anterior cruciate ligament in the U.S. Open Cup quarterfinal against the San Jose Earthquakes on July 8, ending his season and causing him to miss the beginning of the 2026 season as well.

== International career ==
Vázquez was eligible to play for Mexico. He represented the United States at the youth level, but had also been called up by Mexico.

He was part of the United States U17 squad for the 2015 CONCACAF U-17 Championship, playing in four games in the tournament.

Vázquez was then named to the United States squad for the 2015 FIFA U-17 World Cup. He played in two of the three group stage games, scoring against Croatia U17 and Chile U17 as the team finished last in their group and failed to advance from the group stage.

He has also played for the United States at the under-19 and under-20 levels.

Vázquez was called into the US senior national team's January Camp in 2023, which did not tie him to an international side. Vazquez remained uncommitted, stating "nothing has changed [regarding his commitment at the international level]. Last year I was doing everything possible that I could control to give myself the best opportunity to get into the [US] World Cup roster... Unfortunately, it didn’t happen that way, but you have to shake it off and start all over again. That is exactly what I am doing now, start fresh, with a lot of energy and a lot of excitement to be here." Vázquez made his senior debut and start in an international friendly match against Serbia on January 25, 2023, at BMO Stadium in Los Angeles. He headed the lone US goal of the match via an assist from former club teammate Julian Gressel in the 29th minute of the match.

Vázquez made his competitive debut for the US at the 2023 CONCACAF Gold Cup. In the opening group stage match, Vazquez scored a late equalizer to salvage a 1–1 draw for the US versus Jamaica. Vazquez scored against Trinidad & Tobago in a 6–0 rout, tallying the final goal. In his first ever Gold Cup knockout stage match, Vazquez scored an 88th minute go-ahead headed goal versus Canada. Vazquez later missed his penalty shootout attempt, although the US rallied to defeat Canada at TQL Stadium to advance to the semi-finals.

== Personal life ==
Vázquez married Jessica Fleck, whom he began dating during his second MLS season with Atlanta United.

== Career statistics ==
=== Club ===
As of match played November 7, 2026

Appearances and goals by club, season and competition
Club	Season	League			National cup (Note: Includes Copa MX, U.S. Open Cup)		League cup (Note: Includes MLS Cup playoffs)		Continental (Note: Includes CONCACAF Champions Cup)		Other		Total	
Club	Season	Division	Apps	Goals	Apps	Goals	Apps	Goals	Apps	Goals	Apps	Goals	Apps	Goals
Tijuana	2016–17	Liga MX	—		1	0	—		—		—		1	0
Atlanta United	2017	MLS	13	1	2	2	—		—		—		15	3
Atlanta United	2018	MLS	8	0	2	0	—		—		—		10	0
Atlanta United	2019	MLS	11	2	3	4	—		—		—		14	6
Atlanta United	Total		32	3	7	6	—		—		—		39	9
Atlanta United 2	2018	USL	6	2	—		—		—		—		6	2
Atlanta United 2	2019	USL	6	3	—		—		—		—		6	3
Atlanta United 2	Total		12	5	—		—		—		—		12	5
FC Cincinnati	2020	MLS	19	2	—		—		—		—		19	2
FC Cincinnati	2021	MLS	31	4	—		—		—		—		31	4
FC Cincinnati	2022	MLS	33	18	1	0	2	1	—		1 (Note: Appearance in the 2022 Leagues Cup Showcase)	1	37	20
FC Cincinnati	2023	MLS	29	8	4	3	4	1	—		3 (Note: Includes appearances in Leagues Cup)	5	40	17
FC Cincinnati	Total		112	32	5	3	6	2	—		4	6	127	43
Monterrey	2023–24	Liga MX	19	6	—		—		8	4	—		27	10
Monterrey	2024–25	Liga MX	21	4	—		—		—		2	0	23	4
Monterrey	Total		40	10	—		—		8	4	2	0	50	14
Austin FC	2025	MLS	19	5	3	4	0	0	—		0	0	22	9
Austin FC	2026	MLS	22	3	0	0	0	0	—		4	0	26	3
Austin FC	Total		41	8	3	4	0	0	0	0	4	0	48	12
Career totals			236	59	16	13	6	2	8	4	10	6	276	84

=== International ===
As of match played November 18, 2024

Appearances and goals by national team and year
National team	Year	Apps	Goals
United States	2023	8	4
United States	2024	3	0
Total		11	4

Scores and results list the United States' goal tally first, score column indicates score after each Vazquez's goal.

List of international goals scored by Brandon Vasquez
No.	Date	Venue	Cap	Opponent	Score	Result	Competition
1	January 25, 2023	BMO Stadium, Los Angeles, United States	1	Serbia	1–0	1–2	Friendly
2	June 24, 2023	Soldier Field, Chicago, United States	4	Jamaica	1–1	1–1	2023 CONCACAF Gold Cup
3	July 2, 2023	Bank of America Stadium, Charlotte, United States	6	Trinidad and Tobago	6–0	6–0	2023 CONCACAF Gold Cup
4	July 9, 2023	TQL Stadium, Cincinnati, United States	7	Canada	1–0	2–2 (3–2) (p)	2023 CONCACAF Gold Cup

== Honors ==
Atlanta United

- MLS Cup: 2018
- U.S. Open Cup: 2019

FC Cincinnati

- Supporters' Shield: 2023

Individual

- MLS All-Star: 2022
- MLS Best XI: 2022
