= 2017 Atlanta United FC season =

Atlanta United FC
2017 season
- Owner: Arthur Blank
- President: Darren Eales
- Head coach: Gerardo Martino
- Stadium: Bobby Dodd Stadium; Atlanta, Georgia (March–September 2017); Mercedes-Benz Stadium; Atlanta, Georgia (September–October 2017)
- MLS: Conference: 4th Overall: 4th
- MLS Cup playoffs: Knockout round
- U.S. Open Cup: Round of 16
- Top goalscorer: League: Josef Martínez (19); All: Josef Martínez (20)
- Highest home attendance: League/All: 71,874 (Oct. 22 vs. Toronto FC)
- Lowest home attendance: League: 42,511 (Sep. 13 vs. New England Revolution); All: 9,458 (Jun. 14 vs. Charleston Battery)
- Average home league attendance: 48,200 (league – regular season); 49,257 (league – inc. playoffs); 47,162 (all)
- Biggest win: 7 goals: ATL 7–0 NE (Sep. 13)
- Biggest defeat: 2 goals: ATL 1–3 DC (Apr. 30); NYC 3–1 ATL (May 7); VAN 3–1 ATL (Jun. 7)
Home colors	Away colors

The 2017 Atlanta United FC season was the first season of Atlanta United FC's existence, and the ninth year that a professional soccer club from Atlanta, Georgia competed in the top division of American soccer. Atlanta played at Bobby Dodd Stadium for the first half of the season, then finished the season at the team's new stadium, Mercedes-Benz Stadium, once it was completed in September. The team was coached by Gerardo "Tata" Martino. Outside of MLS, Atlanta United participated in the 2017 U.S. Open Cup and the 2017 MLS Cup Playoffs, as well as various preseason competitions.

Atlanta qualified for the MLS Cup Playoffs in their first season, becoming the third-ever MLS expansion club to qualify for the playoffs in their inaugural season, and the first since the Seattle Sounders FC did so in 2009. The team was eliminated from the playoffs in the opening round by the Columbus Crew, losing on penalty kicks.

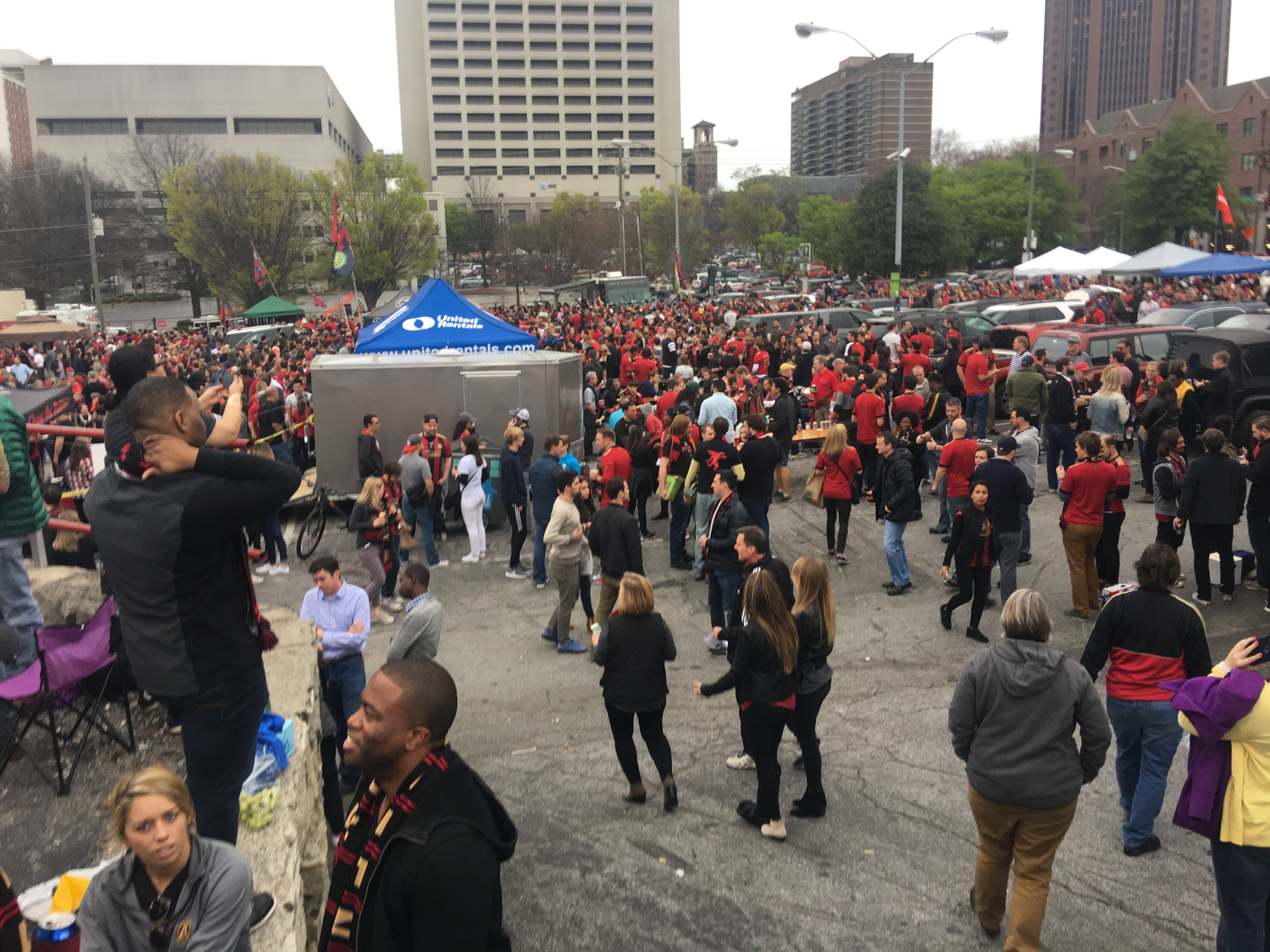
A scene of the first Atlanta United tailgate behind the Varsity. March 5, 2017

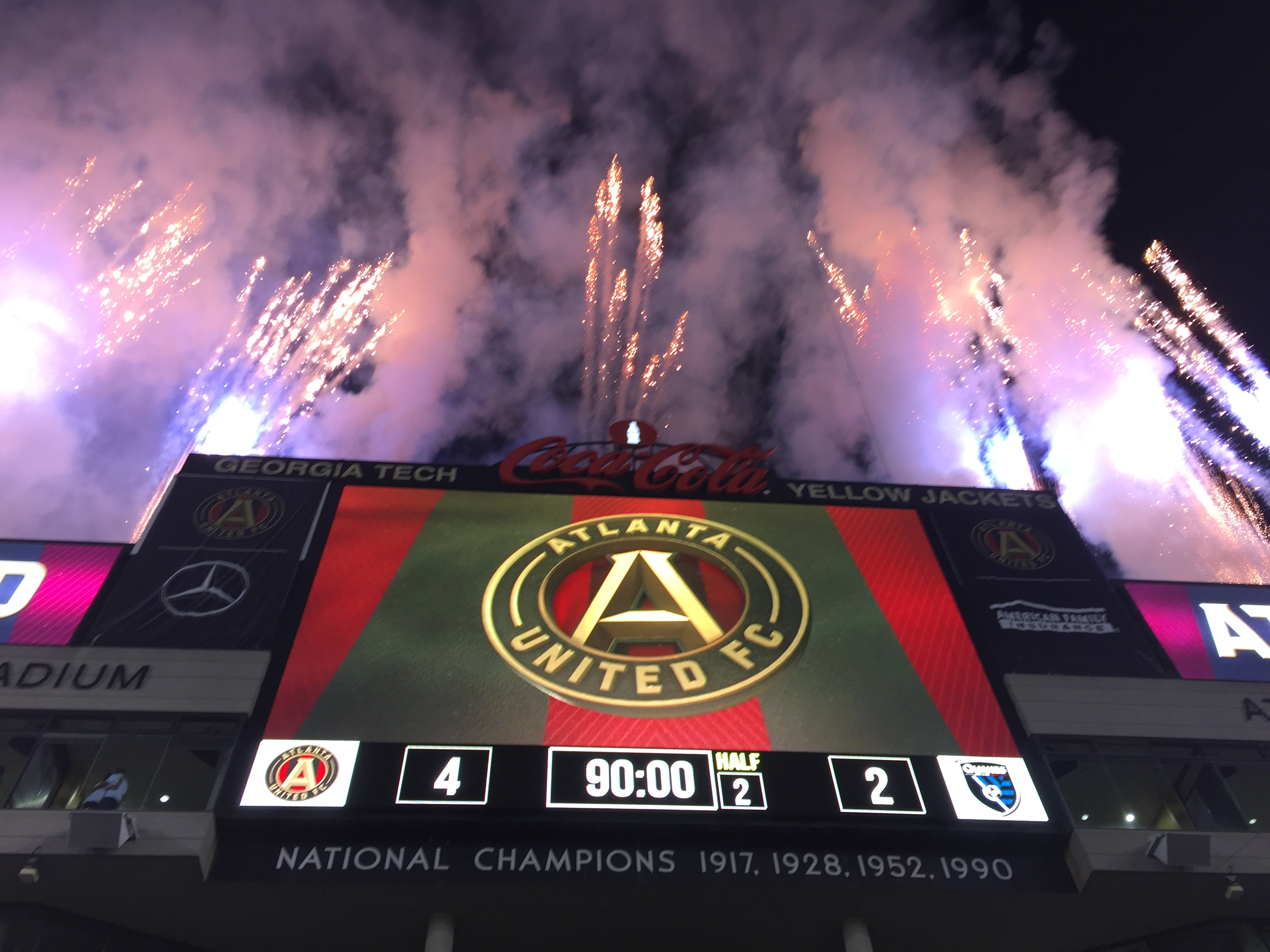
2017-07-04 - Atlanta United vs San Jose Earthquakes - fireworks

2017 marked the first year since 1981 that a first division American soccer team played in Atlanta following the Atlanta Chiefs' dissolving. It was also the first time that soccer had been played at Bobby Dodd Stadium since 2001, when the Atlanta Beat called the stadium home during the 2001 WUSA season.

== Club ==
Squad No.	Name	Nationality	Position(s)	Date of birth (age)	Previous club	App	Goals
Goalkeepers
1	Brad Guzan	(United States)	GK	September 9, 1984 (age 41)	(England) Middlesbrough	15	0
25	Alec Kann	(United States)	GK	August 8, 1990 (age 36)	(United States) Sporting Kansas City	20	0
32	Kyle Reynish	(United States)	GK	November 3, 1983 (age 42)	(United States) New York Red Bulls	2	0
Defenders
2	Tyrone Mears	(England)	RB	February 18, 1983 (age 43)	(United States) Seattle Sounders FC	22	1
3	Michael Parkhurst (Captain)	(United States)	CB	January 24, 1984 (age 42)	(United States) Columbus Crew	34	0
4	Greg Garza	(United States)	LB	August 16, 1991 (age 35)	(Mexico) Tijuana	26	2
5	Leandro González Pírez	(Argentina)	CB	February 26, 1992 (age 34)	(Argentina) Estudiantes	34	1
6	Miles Robinson (GA)	(United States)	CB	March 14, 1997 (age 29)	(United States) Syracuse University	1	0
12	Bobby Boswell	(United States)	CB	March 15, 1983 (age 43)	(United States) D.C. United	1	0
21	Mark Bloom	(United States)	RB	November 25, 1987 (age 38)	(Canada) Toronto	4	0
22	Mikey Ambrose	(United States)	LB	October 5, 1993 (age 32)	(United States) Orlando City SC	10	0
26	Anton Walkes	(England)	CB	February 8, 1997 (age 29)	(England) Tottenham Hotspur	23	2
27	Zach Loyd	(United States)	CB	July 18, 1987 (age 39)	(United States) FC Dallas	1	0
Midfielders
8	Kevin Kratz	(Germany)	CM	January 21, 1987 (age 39)	(United States) Philadelphia Union	22	2
10	Miguel Almirón (DP)	(Paraguay)	LW	February 10, 1994 (age 32)	(Argentina) Lanús	32	9
11	Yamil Asad	(Argentina)	AM	July 27, 1994 (age 32)	(Argentina) Vélez Sarsfield	33	7
13	Harrison Heath	(England)	AM	March 6, 1996 (age 30)	(United States) Orlando City SC	2	0
14	Carlos Carmona	(Chile)	CM	February 21, 1987 (age 39)	(Italy) Atalanta	33	2
15	Héctor Villalba (DP)	(Paraguay)	RW	July 26, 1994 (age 32)	(Argentina) San Lorenzo	35	13
16	Chris McCann	(Republic of Ireland)	DM	July 21, 1987 (age 39)	(England) Wigan Athletic	26	0
18	Jeff Larentowicz (Vice Captain)	(United States)	DM	August 5, 1983 (age 43)	(United States) LA Galaxy	35	1
20	Chris Goslin (HGP)	(United States)	AM	May 12, 2000 (age 26)	(United States) Atlanta United Academy	0	0
24	Julian Gressel	(Germany)	AM	December 16, 1993 (age 32)	(United States) Providence College	35	5
28	Andrew Wheeler-Omiunu	(United States)	AM	November 30, 1994 (age 31)	(United States) Harvard University	1	0
29	Jacob Peterson	(United States)	RW	January 27, 1986 (age 40)	(United States) Sporting Kansas City	11	3
30	Andrew Carleton (HGP)	(United States)	RW	June 22, 2000 (age 26)	(United States) Atlanta United Academy	2	0
Forwards
7	Josef Martínez (DP)	(Venezuela)	ST	May 19, 1993 (age 33)	(Italy) Torino	22	20
9	Kenwyne Jones	(Trinidad and Tobago)	CF	October 5, 1984 (age 41)	(Wales) Cardiff City	17	2
19	Brandon Vazquez	(United States)	CF	October 14, 1998 (age 27)	(Mexico) Tijuana	15	3
Players out on loan
23	Alexandros Tabakis (Note: Tabakis was recalled from his loan to Charleston Battery for the club's October 3 match against Minnesota United FC as Brad Guzan was away on international duty for the United States and Alec Kann was injured. As Kyle Reynish received a red card against Minnesota and was suspended for the club's October 15 match against New York Red Bulls, Tabakis was recalled again to back up Guzan.)	(Greece)	GK	December 8, 1992 (age 33)	(Greece) Panathinaikos	1	0
31	Jeffrey Otoo	(Ghana)	FW	January 21, 1998 (age 28)	(Ghana) Charity Stars	0	0
33	Romario Williams	(Jamaica)	CF	August 15, 1994 (age 32)	(Canada) Montreal Impact	0	0

== Results ==
=== Non-competitive ===
Win Draw Loss

==== Friendlies ====
February 11, 2017 Friendly	Chattanooga FC	0–4	Atlanta United	Chattanooga, Tennessee
3:00 p.m. EST		Report	Villalba 9'; Asad 36'; Martínez 68'; Carleton 73'	Stadium: Finley Stadium; Attendance: 12,484

==== Carolina Challenge Cup ====
February 18, 2017 1	Atlanta United	1–2	Columbus Crew	Charleston, South Carolina
4:30 p.m. EST	Martínez 6'	Report	Higuaín 57', 62'	Stadium: MUSC Health Stadium

February 22, 2017 2	Atlanta United	4–2	Seattle Sounders FC	Charleston, South Carolina
7:30 p.m. EST	Martínez 1', 46'; Almirón 3' (pen.); Villalba 21', (yellow card) 66' (yellow-red card) 69'; González Pírez (yellow card) 36'; Heath (yellow card) 78'; Kratz (yellow card) 78'	Report	Delem (yellow card) 29'; Wingo 62'; Bruin 74'; Lodeiro (yellow card) 84'	Stadium: MUSC Health Stadium

February 25, 2017 3	Charleston Battery	1–2	Atlanta United	Charleston, South Carolina
7:00 p.m. EST	Williams 45'	Report	Asad 4'; Villalba 90'	Stadium: MUSC Health Stadium

=== Competitive ===
==== Major League Soccer ====
===== League tables =====
====== Eastern Conference ======
Pos	Team	Pld	W	L	T	GF	GA	GD	Pts	Qualification
1	Toronto FC	34	20	5	9	74	37	+37	69	MLS Cup Conference Semifinals
2	New York City FC	34	16	9	9	56	43	+13	57	MLS Cup Conference Semifinals
3	Chicago Fire	34	16	11	7	62	48	+14	55	MLS Cup Knockout Round
4	Atlanta United FC	34	15	9	10	70	40	+30	55	MLS Cup Knockout Round
5	Columbus Crew	34	16	12	6	53	49	+4	54	MLS Cup Knockout Round
6	New York Red Bulls	34	14	12	8	53	47	+6	50	MLS Cup Knockout Round
7	New England Revolution	34	13	15	6	53	61	−8	45	
8	Philadelphia Union	34	11	14	9	50	47	+3	42	
9	Montreal Impact	34	11	17	6	52	58	−6	39	
10	Orlando City SC	34	10	15	9	39	58	−19	39	
11	D.C. United	34	9	20	5	31	60	−29	32	

Source: MLS

====== Overall ======
Pos	Team	Pld	W	L	T	GF	GA	GD	Pts
2	New York City FC	34	16	9	9	56	43	+13	57
3	Chicago Fire	34	16	11	7	61	47	+14	55
4	Atlanta United FC	34	15	9	10	70	40	+30	55
5	Columbus Crew	34	16	12	6	53	49	+4	54
6	Portland Timbers	34	15	11	8	60	50	+10	53

Source: MLS
Rules for classification: 1) points; 2) total wins; 3) total goal differential; 4) total goals scored; 5) disciplinary points; 6) away goals scored; 7) away goal differential; 8) coin toss or drawing of lots

===== Results summary =====
Overall								Home						Away					
Pld	W	D	L	GF	GA	GD	Pts	W	D	L	GF	GA	GD	W	D	L	GF	GA	GD
34	15	10	9	70	40	+30	55	11	3	3	48	19	+29	4	7	6	22	21	+1

Source: Match reports

===== Results by round =====
Round	1	2	3	4	5	6	7	8	9	10	11	12	13	14	15	16	17	18	19	20	21	22	23	24	25	26	27	28	29	30	31	32	33	34
Stadium	H	A	H	A	A	A	A	H	A	A	H	H	A	A	H	A	H	A	H	A	H	A	A	A	H	H	H	H	H	H	A	H	A	H
Result	L	W	W	D	D	L	W	L	L	D	W	W	L	L	W	L	W	W	W	W	D	D	L	D	W	W	D	W	W	W	D	L	D	D

Source: Match reports
A = Away; H = Home; W = Win; D = Draw; L = Loss

===== Matches =====
Win Draw Loss

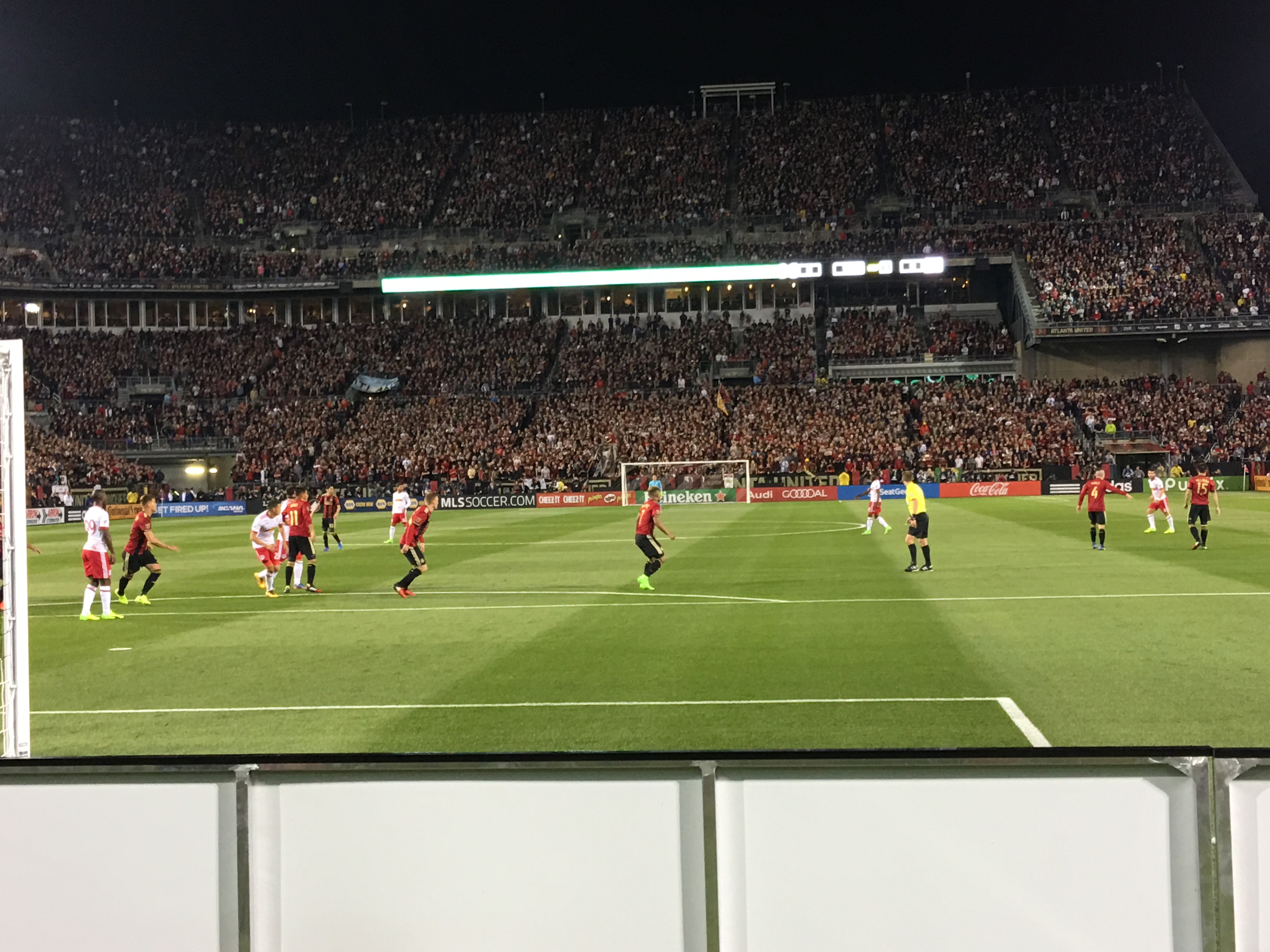
March 5, 2017 1	Atlanta United	1–2	New York Red Bulls	Atlanta, Georgia
7:30 p.m. EST	Asad 25'; Martínez (yellow card) 49'; Carmona (red card) 88'	Report	Zizzo (yellow card) 38'; Perrinelle (yellow card) 66'; Royer 76'; Walkes 82' (o.g.)	Stadium: Bobby Dodd Stadium; Attendance: 55,297; Referee: Mark Geiger
Note: 2017-03-05 - Atlanta United vs NY Red Bulls First Match

March 12, 2017 2	Minnesota United FC	1–6	Atlanta United	Minneapolis, Minnesota
5:00 p.m. EDT	Schüller (yellow card) 19'; Molino 30' (pen.) (yellow card) 57'; Calvo (yellow card) 41'	Report	Martínez 3', 27', 75'; Almirón 13', 52'; González Pírez (yellow card) 34'; Villalba (yellow card) 48'; Peterson 90+4'	Stadium: TCF Bank Stadium; Attendance: 35,043; Referee: Ismail Elfath

March 18, 2017 3	Atlanta United	4–0	Chicago Fire	Atlanta, Georgia
4:00 p.m. EDT	Vincent 4' (o.g.); Gressel (yellow card) 15'; Almirón (yellow card) 45'; Martínez 60', 82'; Villalba 67'	Report	Kappelhof (red card) 11'; Bava (yellow card) 18'	Stadium: Bobby Dodd Stadium; Attendance: 45,922; Referee: Jose Carlos Rivero

March 31, 2017 4	Seattle Sounders FC	0–0	Atlanta United	Seattle, Washington
10:00 p.m. EDT		Report	Gressel (yellow card) 20'; Asad (yellow card) 43'	Stadium: CenturyLink Field; Attendance: 40,182; Referee: Robert Sibiga

April 8, 2017 5	Toronto FC	2–2	Atlanta United	Toronto, Ontario
7:30 p.m. EDT	Giovinco 20'; Morrow 44'; Hagglund (yellow card) 80'	Report	Larentowicz (yellow card) 10'; Villalba 15', 47', (yellow card) 18'; Asad (red card) 75'	Stadium: BMO Field; Attendance: 26,812; Referee: David Gantar

April 15, 2017 6	Montreal Impact	2–1	Atlanta United	Montreal, Quebec
1:00 p.m. EDT	Cabrera (yellow card) 13'; Piatti (yellow card) 45+1', (goal) 45+5' (pen.); Jackson-Hamel 90+3'	Report	Jones 40'; González Pírez (red card) 45+4'; Kann (yellow card) 90+1'	Stadium: Saputo Stadium; Attendance: 17,144; Referee: Alan Kelly

April 22, 2017 7	Real Salt Lake	1–3	Atlanta United	Sandy, Utah
9:30 p.m. EDT	Beckerman (yellow card) 21'; Rusnák 69'	Report	Villalba 9'; Carmona (yellow card) 38'; Asad 46'; Garza (yellow card) 77'; Almirón (yellow card) 84'; Kann (yellow card) 90+3'; Vázquez 90+6'	Stadium: Rio Tinto Stadium; Attendance: 18,946; Referee: Ricardo Salazar

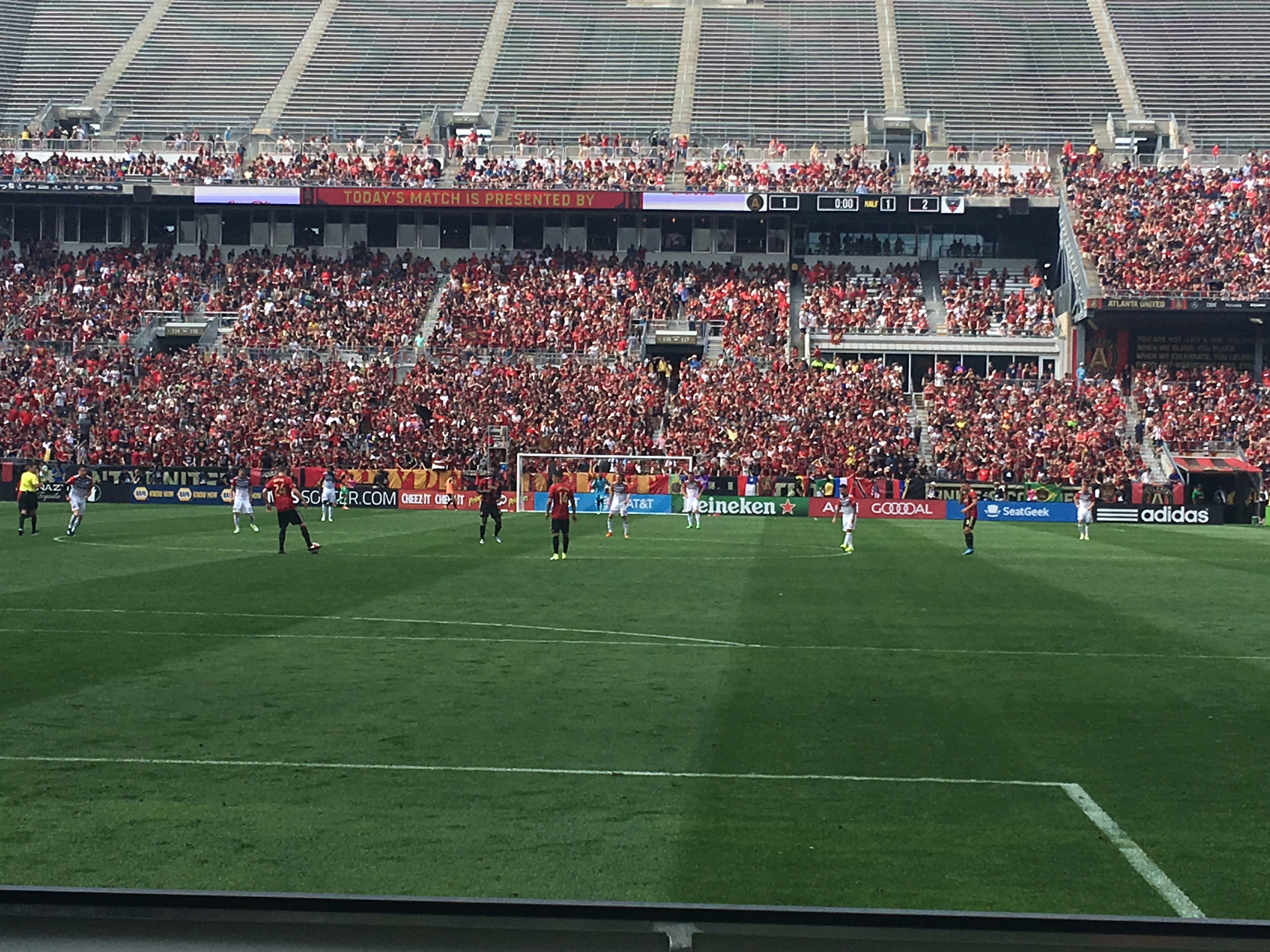
April 30, 2017 8	Atlanta United	1–3	D.C. United	Atlanta, Georgia
3:00 p.m. EDT	Jones 9'; Asad (yellow card) 83'	Report	Franklin (yellow card) 2'; Parkhurst 25' (o.g.); Acosta 36'; Jeffrey (yellow card) 45'; Le Toux 55'	Stadium: Bobby Dodd Stadium; Attendance: 46,011; Referee: Jair Marrufo
Note: 2017-04-30 - Atlanta United vs DC United

May 7, 2017 9	New York City FC	3–1	Atlanta United	New York, New York
4:00 p.m. EDT	Villa 17'; White (yellow card) 50'; Wallace 60'; Moralez 61'	Report	Gressel (yellow card) 34'; Carmona 39'; Parkhurst (yellow card) 43'; Larentowicz (yellow card) 69'; Mears (yellow card) 82'	Stadium: Yankee Stadium; Attendance: 25,605; Referee: Ismail Elfath

May 14, 2017 10	Portland Timbers	1–1	Atlanta United	Portland, Oregon
4:00 p.m. EDT	Ridgewell 50'; Guzmán (yellow card) 54'; Andriuskevicius (yellow card) 73'; Miller (yellow card) 84'	Report	Parkhurst (yellow card) 28'; Carmona (yellow card) 36'; Gressel 46'	Stadium: Providence Park; Attendance: 21,144; Referee: Alan Kelly

May 20, 2017 11	Atlanta United	4–1	Houston Dynamo	Atlanta, Georgia
7:00 p.m. EDT	Almirón 30', 42', 80' (pen.); Garza (yellow card) 51'; Gressel 76'	Report	DeLaGarza (yellow card) 54'; Machado (yellow card) 59'; Torres 90' (pen.)	Stadium: Bobby Dodd Stadium; Attendance: 44,893; Referee: Allen Chapman

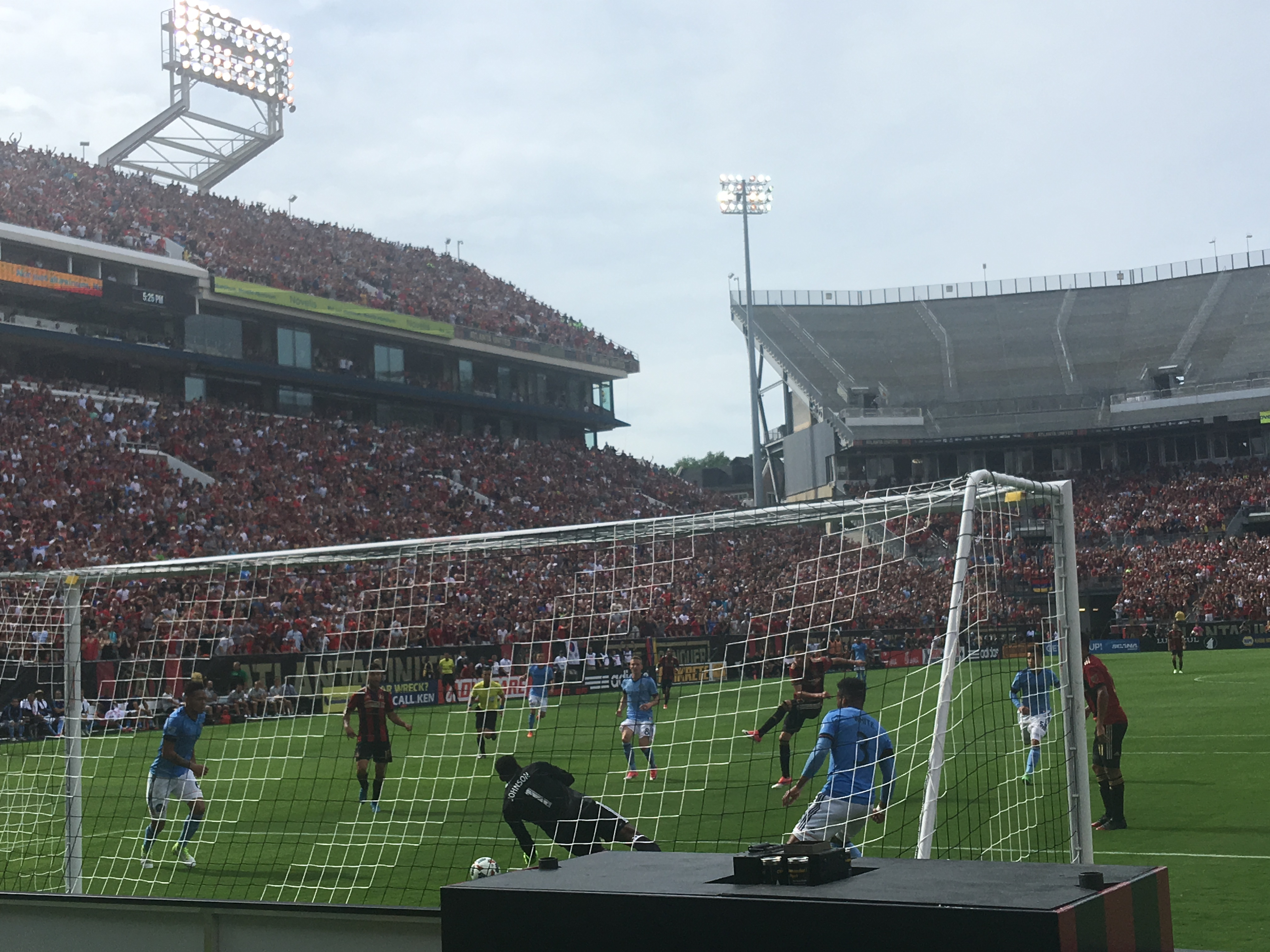
May 28, 2017 12	Atlanta United	3–1	New York City FC	Atlanta, Georgia
5:00 p.m. EDT	Almirón 16', 23'; Villalba 19'; Parkhurst (yellow card) 36'; Carmona (yellow card) 65'	Report	Ring (yellow card) 43'; Harrison 71'; Moralez (yellow card) 90+1'	Stadium: Bobby Dodd Stadium; Attendance: 44,901; Referee: Armando Villarreal
Note: 2017-05-28 - Atlanta United vs NYFC - Almiron scoring

June 3, 2017 13	Vancouver Whitecaps FC	3–1	Atlanta United	Vancouver, British Columbia
5:30 p.m. EDT	Waston 31', 44', (yellow card) 87'; Montero 68'	Report	Garza 7'; Almirón (yellow card) 62'; González Pírez (yellow card) 70'	Stadium: BC Place; Attendance: 19,816; Referee: Robert Sibiga

June 10, 2017 14	Chicago Fire	2–0	Atlanta United	Bridgeview, Illinois
4:00 p.m. EDT	Solignac 29'; Schweinsteiger (yellow card) 50'; Accam (yellow card) 59'; Nikolić 70' (pen.)	Report	Kratz (yellow card) 39'; Carmona (yellow card) 67'	Stadium: Toyota Park; Attendance: 18,453; Referee: Alan Kelly

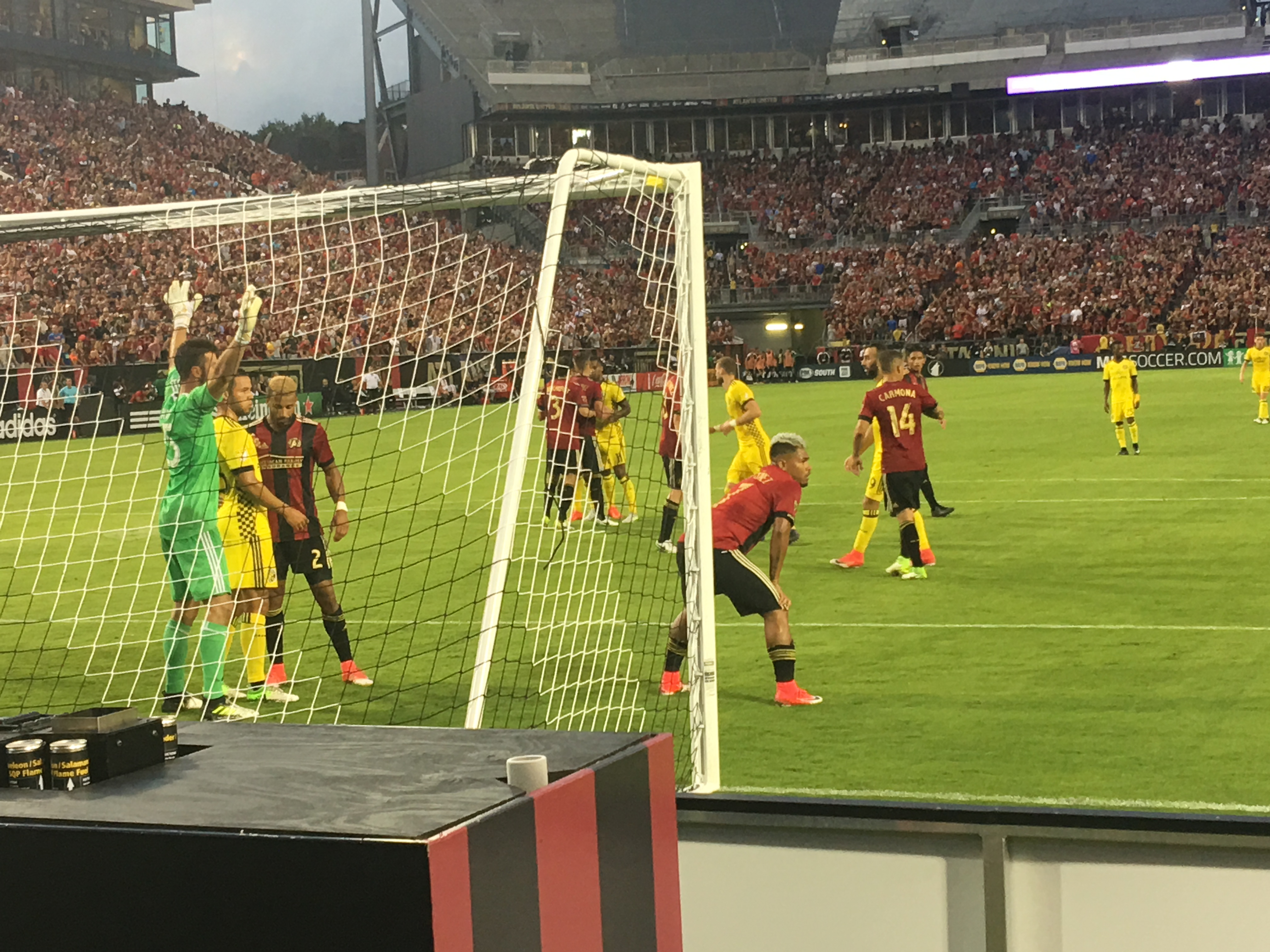
June 17, 2017 15	Atlanta United	3–1	Columbus Crew	Atlanta, Georgia
7:00 p.m. EDT	Villalba 16'; Carmona (yellow card) 21'; Asad (yellow card) 54'; Almirón 67'; Martínez 88'	Report	Higuaín 26'; Afful (yellow card) 53'	Stadium: Bobby Dodd Stadium; Attendance: 44,922; Referee: Ricardo Salazar
Note: 2017-06-17 - Atlanta United vs Columbus Crew

June 21, 2017 16	D.C. United	2–1	Atlanta United	Washington, D.C.
7:30 p.m. EDT	Acosta 23'; Nyarko 60'; Neagle (yellow card) 73'	Report	Gressel 17'; Larentowicz (yellow card) 62'; Vazquez (yellow card) 79'	Stadium: Robert F. Kennedy Memorial Stadium; Attendance: 14,594; Referee: Nima Saghafi

June 24, 2017 17	Atlanta United	1–0	Colorado Rapids	Atlanta, Georgia
7:00 p.m. EDT	Martínez 67'; Almirón (yellow card) 84'	Report	Castillo (yellow card) 35'; Gatt (yellow card) 48'; Powers (yellow card) 72'; Azira (yellow card) 81'	Stadium: Bobby Dodd Stadium; Attendance: 44,938; Referee: Silviu Petrescu

July 1, 2017 18	Columbus Crew	0–2	Atlanta United	Columbus, Ohio
7:30 p.m. EDT	Meram (yellow card) 29'	Report	Villalba 27', 64'; Kann (yellow card) 84'	Stadium: Mapfre Stadium; Attendance: 20,391; Referee: Hilario Grajeda

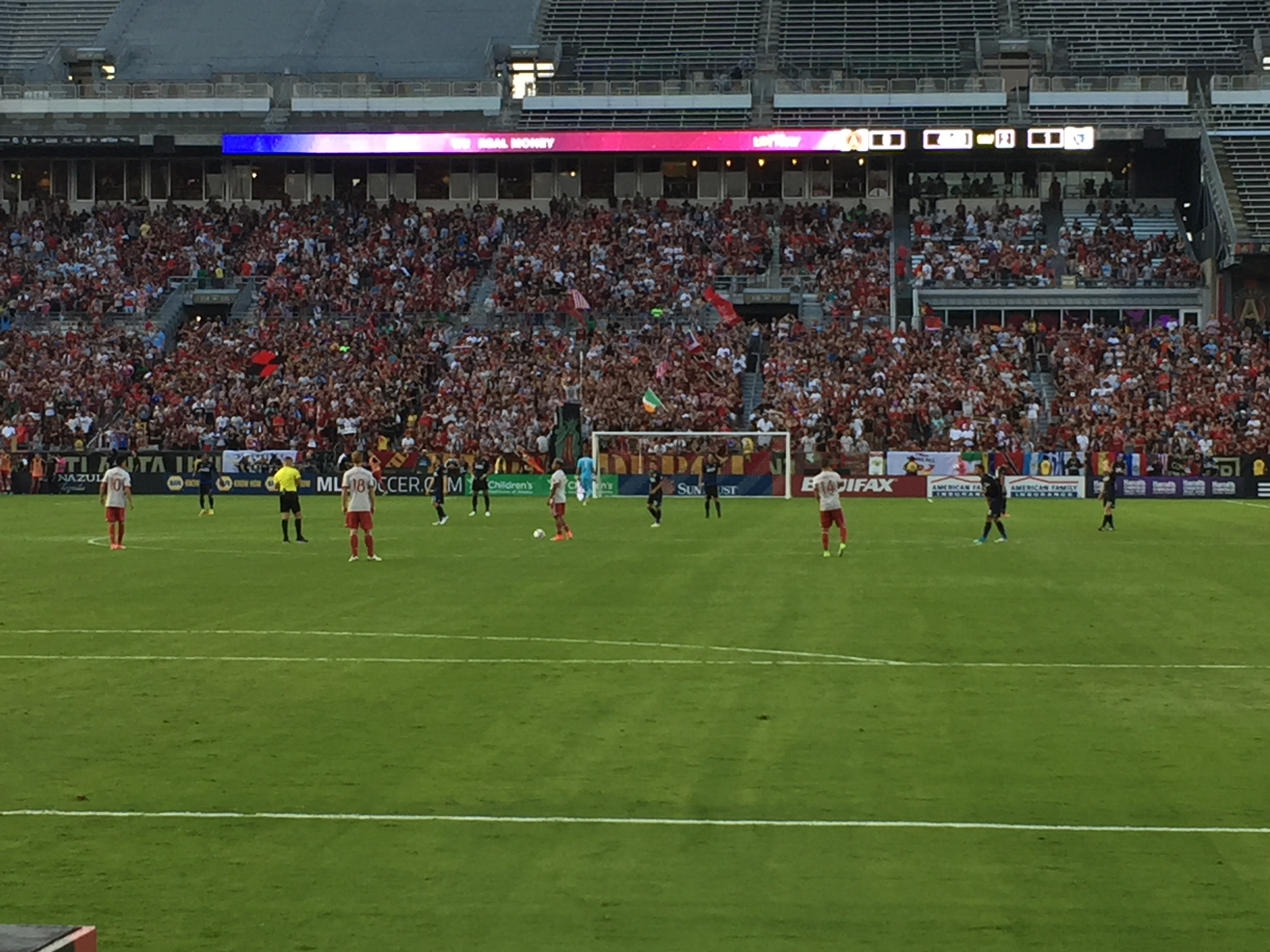
July 4, 2017 19	Atlanta United	4–2	San Jose Earthquakes	Atlanta, Georgia
7:00 p.m. EDT	Walkes (yellow card) 15', (goal) 81'; González Pírez (yellow card) 18'; Carmona (yellow card) 42', (goal) 55'; Martínez 65', 89', (yellow card) 90'; Larentowicz (yellow card) 74'	Report	Thompson 2'; Sarkodie (yellow card) 10' (yellow-red card) 32'; Bingham (yellow card) 18'; Wondolowski 66'; Bernárdez (red card) 90+3'	Stadium: Bobby Dodd Stadium; Attendance: 44,974; Referee: José Carlos Rivero
Note: 2017-07-04 - Atlanta United vs San Jose Earthquakes

July 21, 2017 20	Orlando City SC	0–1	Atlanta United	Orlando, Florida
7:30 p.m. EDT	Kaká (yellow card) 6'; Johnson (yellow card) 60'	Report	González Pírez (yellow card) 38'; Gressel (yellow card) 67'; Parkhurst (yellow card) 80'; Villalba 86'	Stadium: Orlando City Stadium; Attendance: 25,527; Referee: José Carlos Rivero

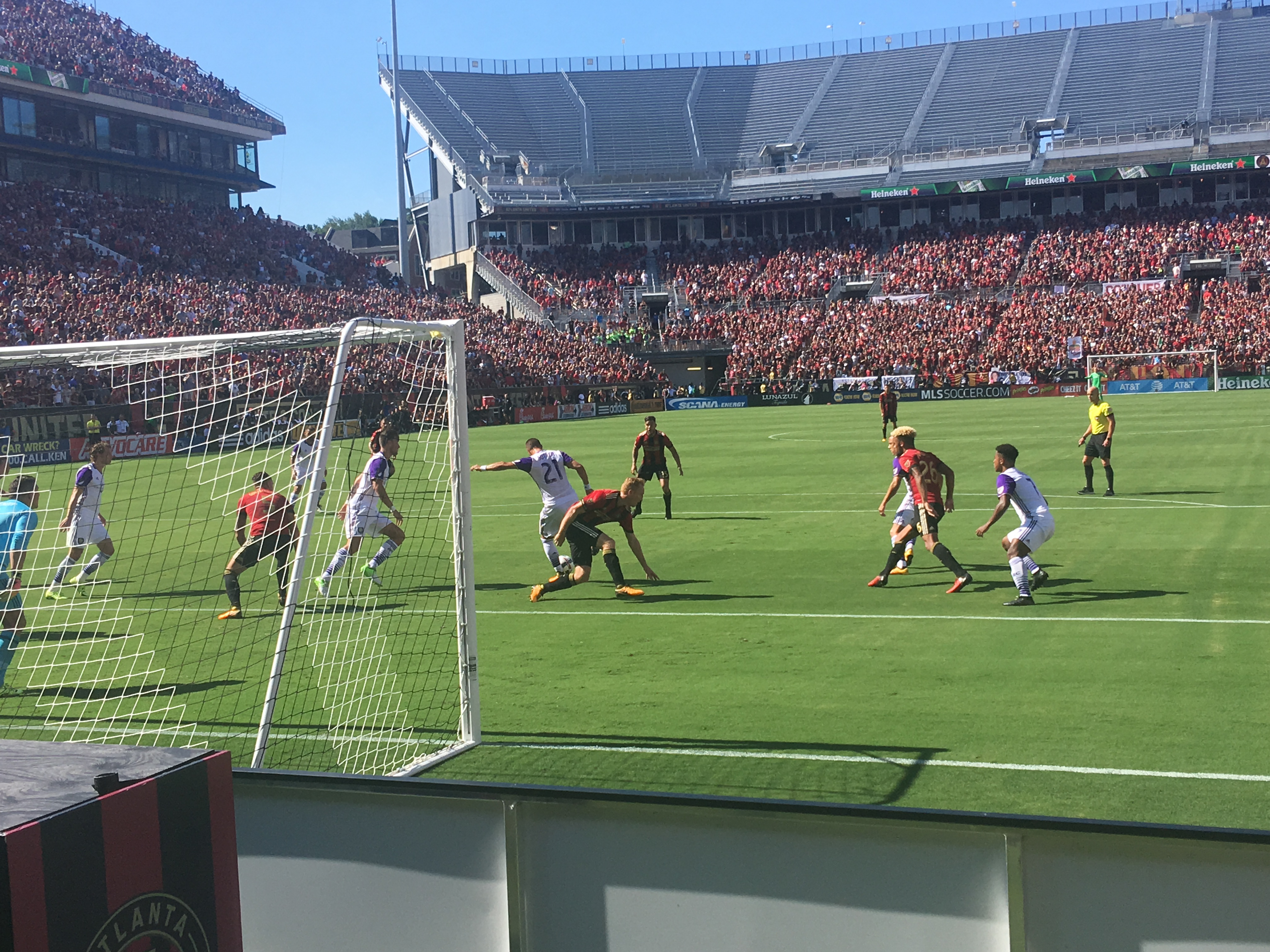
July 29, 2017 21	Atlanta United	1–1	Orlando City SC	Atlanta, Georgia
5:00 p.m. EDT	Asad (yellow card) 24'; Villalba (yellow card) 56', (goal) 90+2'	Report	Kaká 40'; Higuita (yellow card) 56'; Johnson (yellow card) 86'	Stadium: Bobby Dodd Stadium; Attendance: 45,006; Referee: Allen Chapman
Note: 2017-07-29 - Atlanta United vs Orlando City

August 6, 2017 22	Sporting Kansas City	1–1	Atlanta United	Kansas City, Kansas
8:00 p.m. EDT	Opara (yellow card) 27'; Feilhaber 59' (pen.)	Report	Larentowicz (yellow card) 21'; Carmona (yellow card) 24'; Asad (yellow card) 51'; González Pírez (yellow card) 61'; Ambrose (yellow card) 77'; Peterson 90+1'	Stadium: Children's Mercy Park; Attendance: 19,481; Referee: Chris Penso

August 23, 2017 23	D.C. United	1–0	Atlanta United	Washington, D.C.
7:30 p.m. EDT	Acosta (yellow card) 18'; Brown (yellow card) 24'; Parkhurst 46' (o.g.); Sarvas (yellow card) 53'; Mullins (yellow card) 90+2'	Report	Walkes (yellow card) 12'; Carmona (yellow card) 78'	Stadium: Robert F. Kennedy Memorial Stadium; Attendance: 11,972; Referee: Ted Unkel

August 26, 2017 24	Philadelphia Union	2–2	Atlanta United	Chester, Pennsylvania
7:00 p.m. EDT	Bedoya (yellow card) 10', (goal) 23'; Alberg 18'; Sapong (yellow card) 29'; Yaro (red card) 52'	Report	Martínez (yellow card) 13'; Asad 26'; Mears 90+1'	Stadium: Talen Energy Stadium; Attendance: 17,221; Referee: Drew Fischer

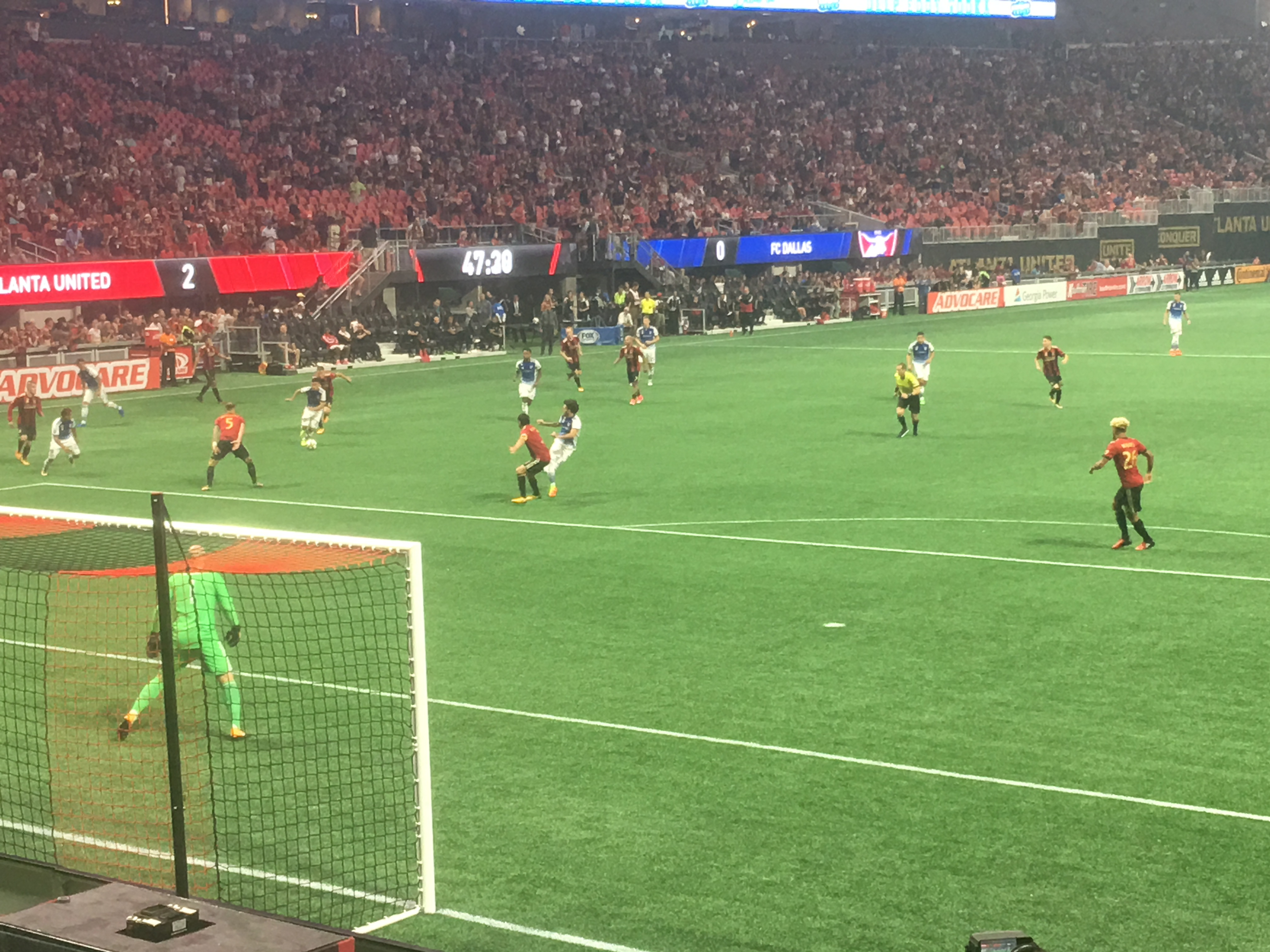
September 10, 2017 25	Atlanta United	3–0	FC Dallas	Atlanta, Georgia
3:30 p.m. EDT	González Pírez 14', (yellow card) 50'; Martínez 46'; Garza 68'	Report	Gruezo (yellow card) 2'	Stadium: Mercedes-Benz Stadium; Attendance: 45,314; Referee: Mark Geiger
Note: 2017-09-10 - Atlanta United vs FC Dallas

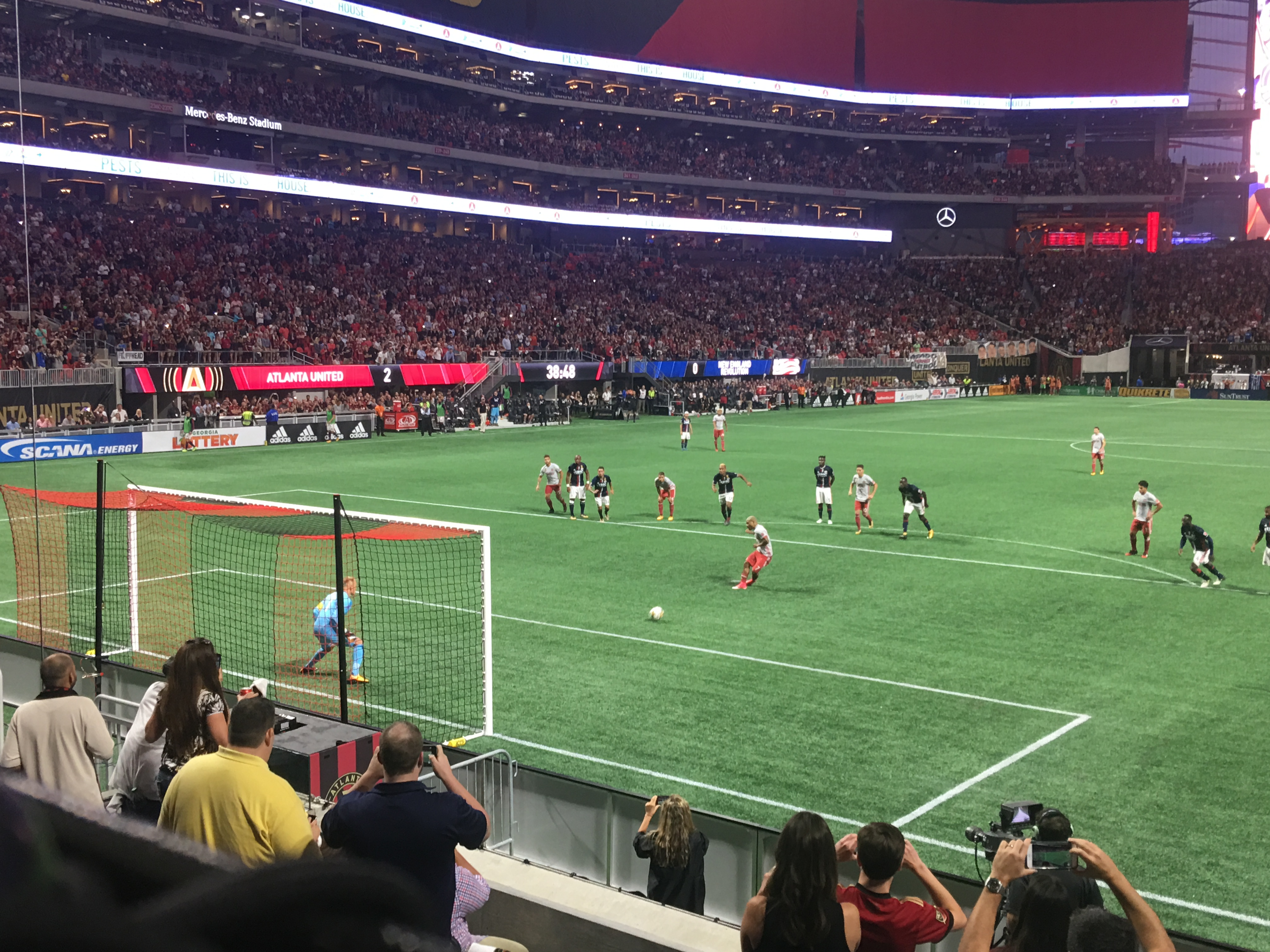
September 13, 2017 26	Atlanta United	7–0	New England Revolution	Atlanta, Georgia
7:00 p.m. EDT	Martínez 2', 31', 39'; González Pírez (yellow card) 23'; Walkes 45+2'; Kratz 70'; Asad 73'; Villalba 90'	Report	Farrell (yellow card) 6'; Koffie (yellow card) 8'; Kouassi (red card) 16'; Delamea (red card) 38'	Stadium: Mercedes-Benz Stadium; Attendance: 42,511; Referee: Baldomero Toledo
Note: 2017-09-13 - Atlanta United vs New England Revolution - Martinez scoring

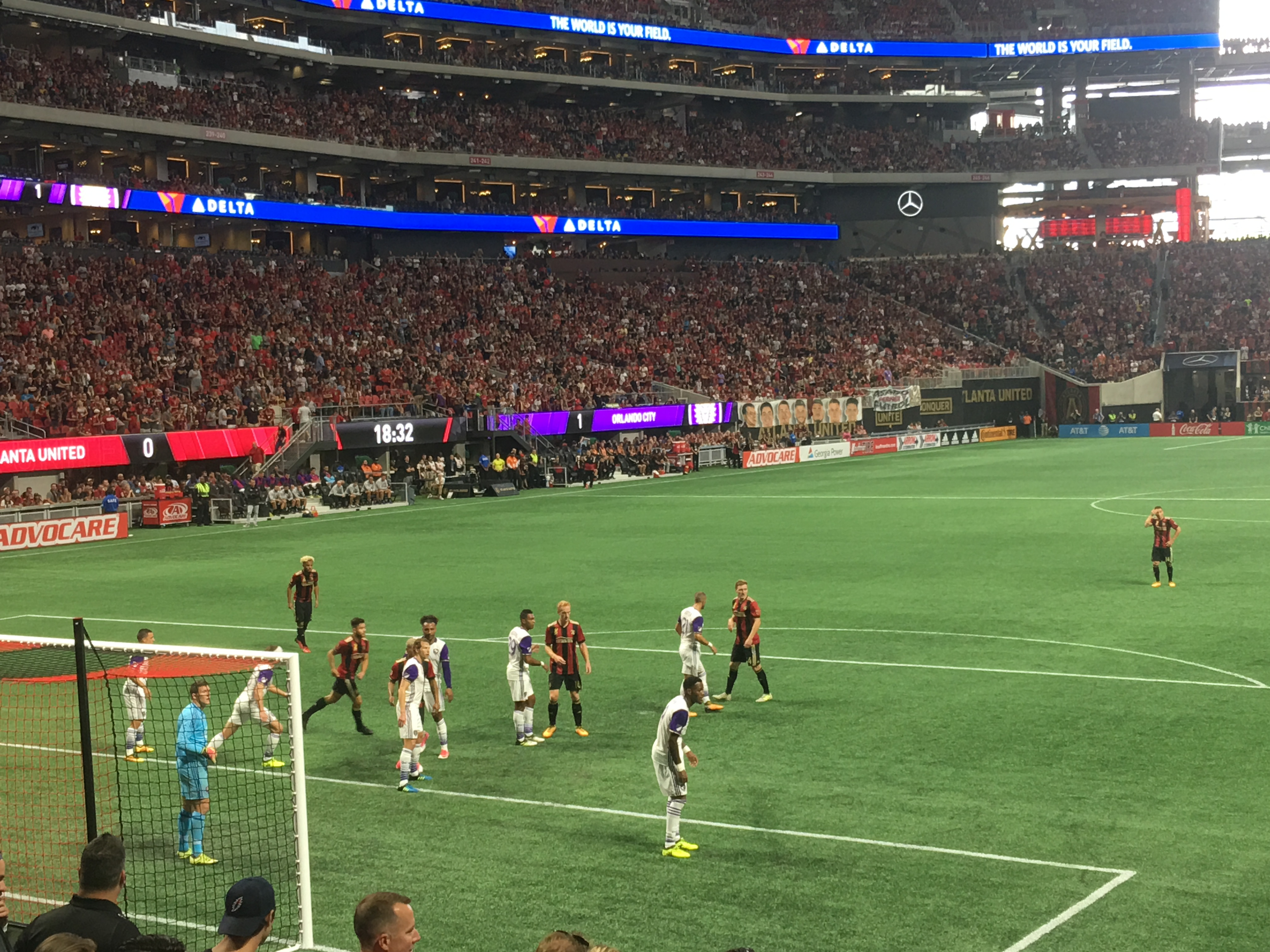
September 16, 2017 27	Atlanta United	3–3	Orlando City SC	Atlanta, Georgia
4:00 p.m. EDT	Martínez 36', 55', 69'	Report	Dwyer 10', 39'; Larin 58'	Stadium: Mercedes-Benz Stadium; Attendance: 70,425; Referee: Jair Marrufo
Note: 2017-09-16 - Atlanta United vs Orlando City

September 20, 2017 28	Atlanta United	4–0	LA Galaxy	Atlanta, Georgia
7:00 p.m. EDT	Martínez 13'; Asad 16', 20'; Villalba (yellow card) 39'; Almirón 43'; González Pírez (yellow card) 45+2'; Vazquez (red card) 82'	Report	Jones (red card) 39'; Alessandrini (yellow card) 58'	Stadium: Mercedes-Benz Stadium; Attendance: 42,723; Referee: Ricardo Salazar

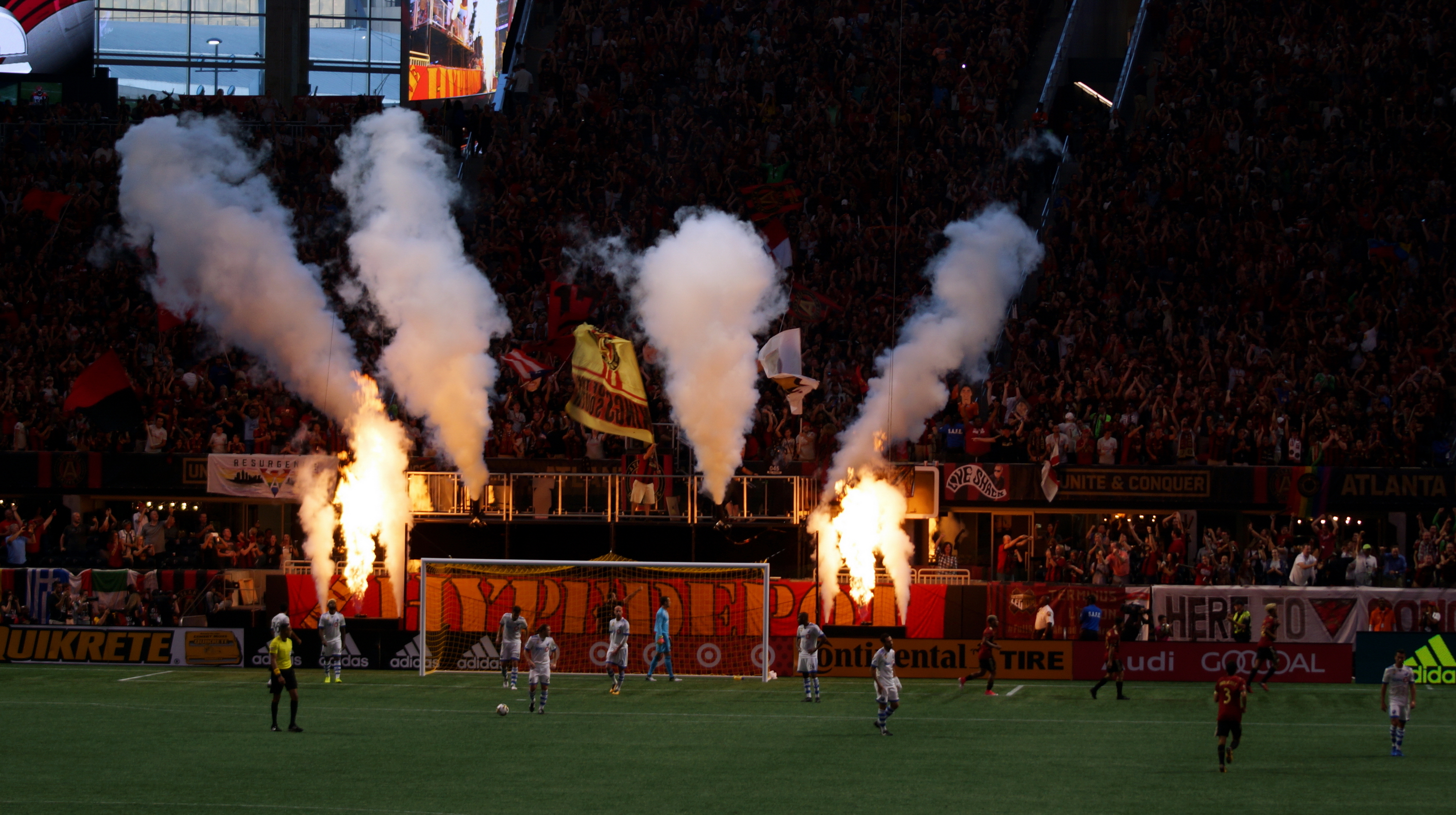
September 24, 2017 29	Atlanta United	2–0	Montreal Impact	Atlanta, Georgia
5:00 p.m. EDT	Villalba 28'; Larentowicz 73'	Report		Stadium: Mercedes-Benz Stadium; Attendance: 43,502; Referee: Juan Guzman
Note: 2017-09-24 - Atlanta United vs Montreal Impact

September 27, 2017 30	Atlanta United	3–0	Philadelphia Union	Atlanta, Georgia
7:00 p.m. EDT	Gressel 27'; Martínez 33', (yellow card) 67'; Peterson 88'	Report		Stadium: Mercedes-Benz Stadium; Attendance: 43,006; Referee: Mark Geiger

September 30, 2017 31	New England Revolution	0–0	Atlanta United	Foxborough, Massachusetts
7:30 p.m. EDT		Report	González Pírez (yellow card) 25'	Stadium: Gillette Stadium; Attendance: 21,925; Referee: Nima Saghafi

October 3, 2017 32	Atlanta United	2–3	Minnesota United FC	Atlanta, Georgia
7:00 p.m. EDT	Mears (yellow card) 38'; Reynish (red card) 60'; Villalba 67'; Gressel 72'; Asad (yellow card) 79'	Report	Martin (yellow card) 30'; Danladi 48'; Kallman (yellow card) 79'; Ramirez 90'; Molino 90+6', (yellow card) 90+7'	Stadium: Mercedes-Benz Stadium; Attendance: 43,185; Referee: Armando Villarreal

October 15, 2017 33	New York Red Bulls	0–0	Atlanta United FC	Harrison, New Jersey
3:00 p.m. EDT		Report	Asad (yellow card) 61'; González Pírez (yellow card) 90+5'	Stadium: Red Bull Arena; Attendance: 25,219; Referee: Alan Kelly

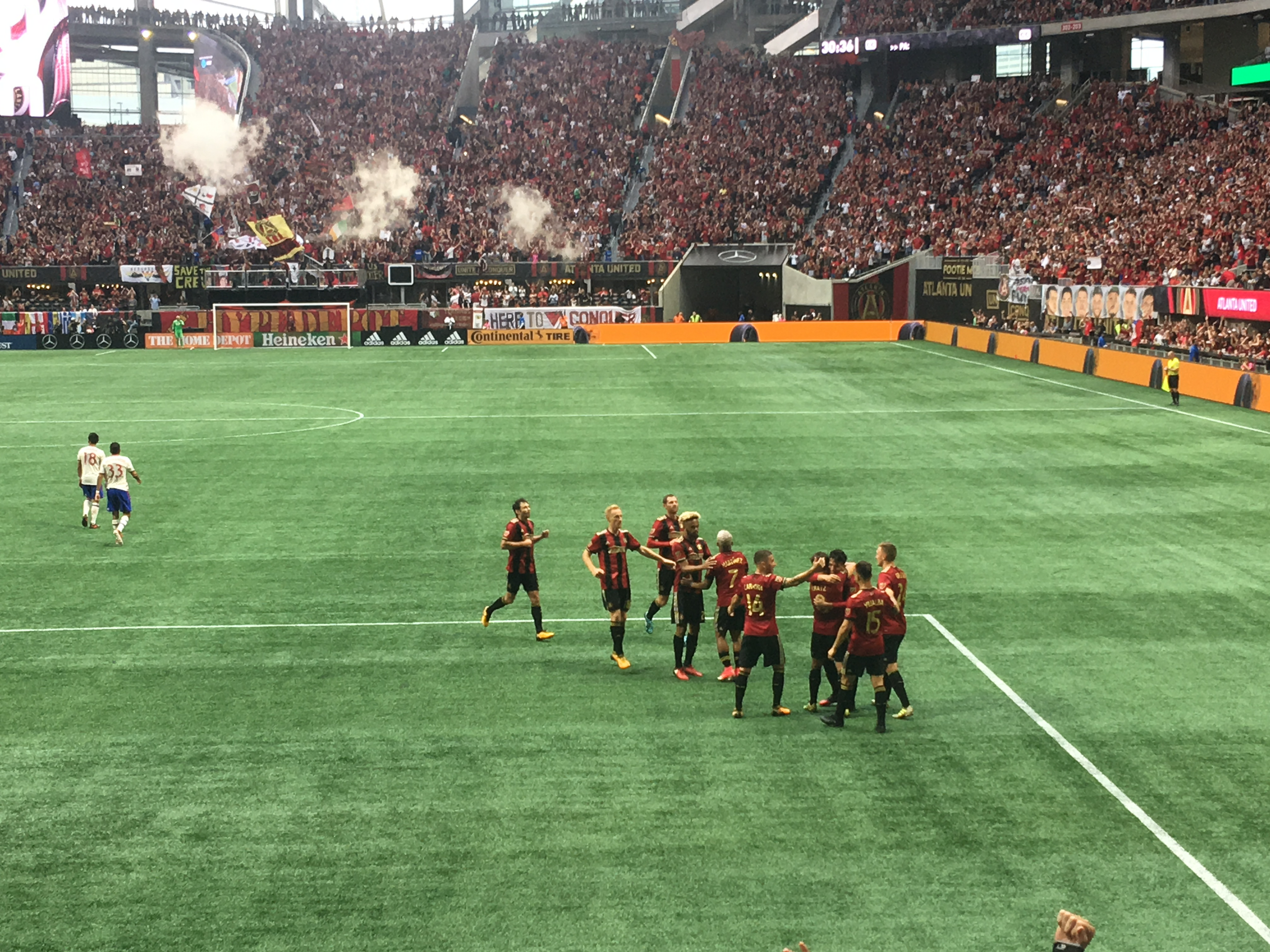
October 22, 2017 34	Atlanta United	2–2	Toronto FC	Atlanta, Georgia
4:00 p.m. EDT	Asad 31' (pen.); Larentowicz (yellow card) 52'; Martínez 74'	Report	Altidore 60'; Mavinga (yellow card) 67'; Giovinco 84'	Stadium: Mercedes-Benz Stadium; Attendance: 71,874; Referee: Robert Sibiga
Note: 2017-10-22 -Atlanta United vs Toronto FC

==== MLS Cup Playoffs ====
Win Draw Loss

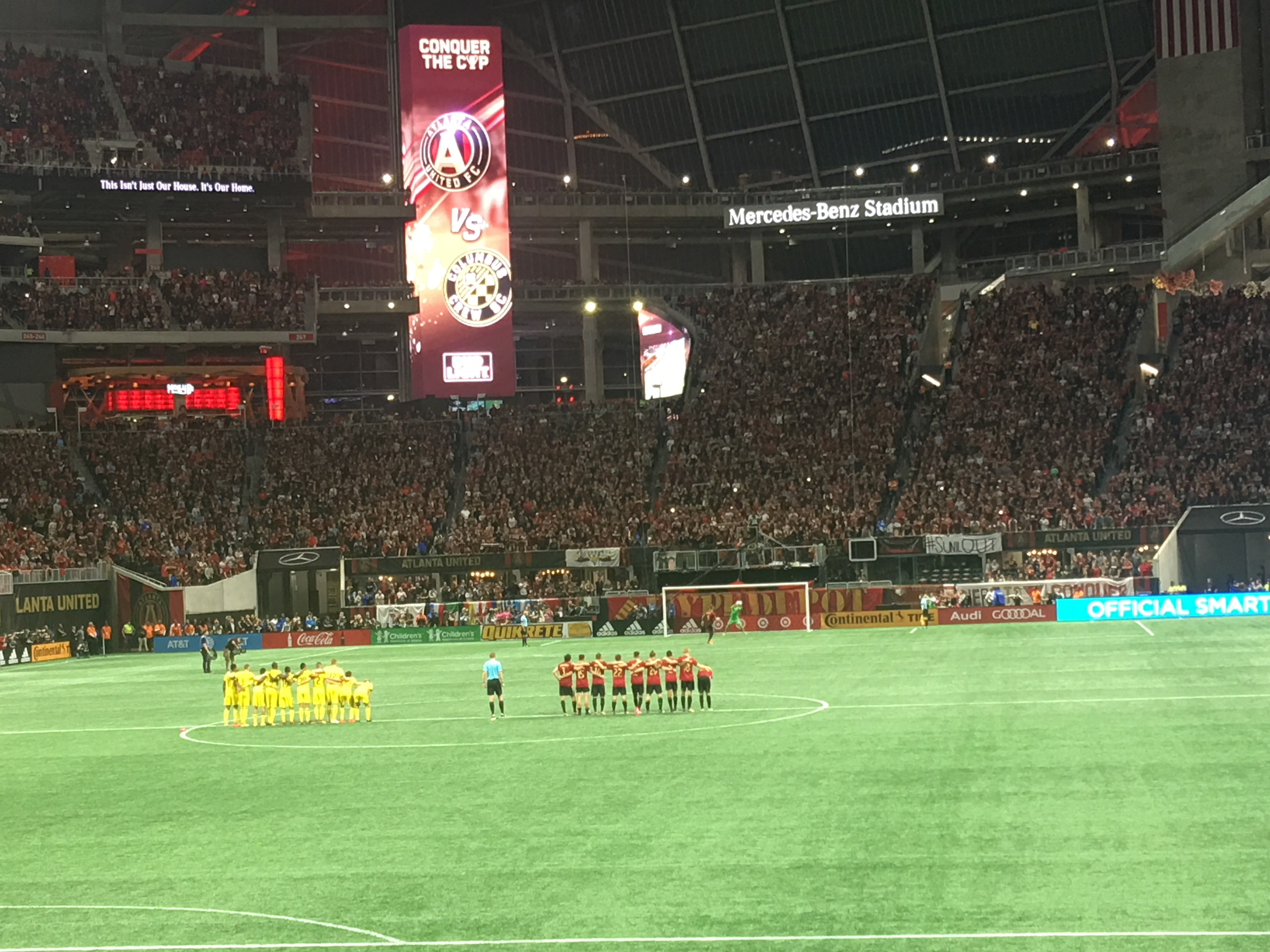
October 26, 2017 Knockout round	Atlanta United	0–0 (a.e.t.) (1–3 p)	Columbus Crew	Atlanta, Georgia
7:00 p.m. EDT		Report	Jiménez (yellow card) 64'; Artur (yellow card) 96'	Stadium: Mercedes-Benz Stadium; Attendance: 67,221; Referee: Allen Chapman
	Penalties
	Gressel (penalty missed); González Pírez (penalty missed); Villalba (penalty scored); Larentowicz (penalty missed)		(penalty scored) Higuaín; (penalty missed) Manneh; (penalty scored) Hansen; (penalty scored) Jahn
Note: 2017-10-26 - Atlanta United vs Columbus Crew - shootout

==== U.S. Open Cup ====
Win Draw Loss

June 14, 2017 Fourth round	Atlanta United	3–2	Charleston Battery	Kennesaw, Georgia
7:30 p.m. EDT	Kratz 30'; Larentowicz (yellow card) 34'; Martínez 48'; Walkes (yellow card) 59'; Vazquez 72'	Report	Lasso 3'; Marini 31'; Mueller (yellow card) 89'	Stadium: Fifth Third Bank Stadium; Attendance: 9,458; Referee: Guido Gonzalez Jr.

June 28, 2017 Round of 16	Miami FC	3–2	Atlanta United	Miami, Florida
7:30 p.m. EDT	Pinho 37'; Bernstein 52'; Ryan (yellow card) 62'; Poku 90+3'	Report	Vazquez 35'; Walkes (yellow card) 55'; Gressel 75' (pen.); González Pírez (yellow card) 88'; McCann (yellow card) 90+1'	Stadium: Riccardo Silva Stadium; Attendance: 9,004; Referee: José Carlos Rivero

== Statistics ==
=== Top scorers ===
Place	Position	Name	MLS	Playoffs	U.S. Open Cup	Total
1	FW	(Venezuela) Josef Martínez	19	0	1	20
2	MF	(Paraguay) Héctor Villalba	13	0	0	13
3	MF	(Paraguay) Miguel Almirón	9	0	0	9
4	MF	(Argentina) Yamil Asad	7	0	0	7
5	MF	(Germany) Julian Gressel	5	0	1	6
6	FW	(United States) Jacob Peterson	3	0	0	3
6	FW	(United States) Brandon Vazquez	1	0	2	3
8	MF	(Chile) Carlos Carmona	2	0	0	2
8	DF	(United States) Greg Garza	2	0	0	2
8	FW	(Trinidad and Tobago) Kenwyne Jones	2	0	0	2
8	MF	(Germany) Kevin Kratz	1	0	1	2
8	DF	(England) Anton Walkes	2	0	0	2
13	DF	(Argentina) Leandro González Pírez	1	0	0	1
13	MF	(United States) Jeff Larentowicz	1	0	0	1
13	DF	(England) Tyrone Mears	1	0	0	1
Own Goals			1	0	0	1
Total			70	0	5	75

=== Disciplinary record ===
No.	Pos.	Name	MLS			MLS Cup			U.S. Open Cup			Total		
No.	Pos.	Name	Booked	(yellow card) (yellow-red card)	Sent off (straight red)	Booked	(yellow card) (yellow-red card)	Sent off (straight red)	Booked	(yellow card) (yellow-red card)	Sent off (straight red)	Booked	(yellow card) (yellow-red card)	Sent off (straight red)
2	DF	Tyrone Mears	2									2		
3	DF	Michael Parkhurst	4									4		
4	DF	Greg Garza	2									2		
5	DF	Leandro González Pírez	10		1				1			11		1
7	FW	Josef Martínez	4									4		
8	MF	Kevin Kratz	1									1		
10	MF	Miguel Almirón	4									4		
11	MF	Yamil Asad	7		1							7		1
14	MF	Carlos Carmona	8		1							8		1
15	MF	Héctor Villalba	4									4		
16	MF	Chris McCann	1						1			1		
18	MF	Jeff Larentowicz	6						1			7		
19	FW	Brandon Vazquez	1		1							1		1
22	DF	Mikey Ambrose	1									1		
24	MF	Julian Gressel	4									4		
25	GK	Alec Kann	3									3		
26	DF	Anton Walkes	2						2			4		
Total			64	0	4	0	0	0	5	0	0	69	0	4

== Player movement ==
=== In ===
Per Major League Soccer and club policies terms of the deals do not get disclosed.

No.	Pos.	Player	Transferred from	Type	US	Fee/notes	Date	Source
23	GK	(Greece) Alex Tambakis	(Greece) Panathinaikos	Transfer	US	Free	January 25, 2016	
—	MF	(El Salvador) Junior Burgos	(United States) Atlanta Silverbacks	Transfer	US	Free	February 2, 2016	
31	FW	(Ghana) Jeffrey Otoo	(Ghana) Charity Stars	Transfer	Non-US	Undisclosed	June 1, 2016	
30	MF	(United States) Andrew Carleton	(United States) Atlanta United Academy	Transfer	US	Signed as a Homegrown Player (HGP)	June 9, 2016	
16	MF	(Republic of Ireland) Chris McCann	(England) Wigan Athletic	Transfer	Non-US (Note: Acquired a green card during the 2017 season, qualifying him as a domestic player.)	Free	June 26, 2016	
9	FW	(Trinidad and Tobago) Kenwyne Jones	(Wales) Cardiff City	Transfer	Non-US	Free	July 15, 2016	
15	MF	(Paraguay) (Note: Villalba was considered an Argentine for FIFA purposes during the 2017 season, before filing a one-time switch in 2018 to play for Paraguay, who he qualified to represent through his father.) Héctor Villalba	(Argentina) San Lorenzo	Transfer	Non-US	$2.5 Million (DP)	July 22, 2016	
20	MF	(United States) Chris Goslin	(United States) Atlanta United Academy	Transfer	US	Signed as a Homegrown Player (HGP)	October 6, 2016	
19	FW	(United States) Brandon Vazquez	(Mexico) Tijuana	Transfer	US	Undisclosed	December 2, 2016	
10	MF	(Paraguay) Miguel Almirón	(Argentina) Lanús	Transfer	Non-US	$7.5 Million (DP)	December 5, 2016	
8	MF	(Germany) Kevin Kratz	(United States) Philadelphia Union	Trade	Non-US	Received in exchange for 2020 fourth round draft pick	December 11, 2016	
13	MF	(England) Harrison Heath	(United States) Orlando City SC	Trade	US	Received in exchange for 2019 fourth round draft pick	December 11, 2016	
3	DF	(United States) Michael Parkhurst	(United States) Columbus Crew	Trade	US	Received in exchange for GAM	December 11, 2016	
33	FW	(Jamaica) Romario Williams	(Canada) Montreal Impact	Trade	Non-US	Received in exchange for 2018 third round draft pick	December 11, 2016	
27	DF	(United States) Zach Loyd	(United States) FC Dallas	Expansion Draft	US	Free	December 13, 2016	
22	DF	(United States) Mikey Ambrose	(United States) Orlando City SC	Expansion Draft	US	Free	December 13, 2016	
25	GK	(United States) Alec Kann	(United States) Sporting Kansas City	Expansion Draft	US	Free	December 13, 2016	
21	DF	(United States) Mark Bloom	(Canada) Toronto FC	Trade	US	Received along with GAM in exchange for Clint Irwin	December 13, 2016	
18	DF	(United States) Jeff Larentowicz	(United States) LA Galaxy	Transfer	US	Free	December 14, 2016	
29	MF	(United States) Jacob Peterson	(United States) Sporting Kansas City	Transfer	US	Free	December 21, 2016	
6	DF	(United States) Miles Robinson	(United States) Syracuse University	Draft	US	Free	January 13, 2017	
24	DF	(Germany) Julian Gressel	(United States) Providence College	Draft	Non-US	Free	January 13, 2017	
2	DF	(England) Tyrone Mears	(United States) Seattle Sounders FC	Trade	US	Received in exchange for GAM	January 24, 2017	
5	DF	(Argentina) Leandro González Pírez	(Argentina) Estudiantes	Transfer	Non-US	Undisclosed; Used TAM	January 26, 2017	
1	GK	(United States) Brad Guzan	(England) Middlesbrough	Transfer	US	Free; Used TAM	January 26, 2017	
14	MF	(Chile) Carlos Carmona	(Italy) Atalanta	Transfer	Non-US	Free	February 6, 2017	
28	MF	(United States) Andrew Wheeler-Omiunu	(United States) Harvard University	Draft	US	Free	February 10, 2017	
32	GK	(United States) Kyle Reynish	(United States) New York Red Bulls	Trade	US	Received in exchange for 2018 fourth round draft pick	March 1, 2017	
31	ST	(Honduras) Bryan Róchez	(United States) Orlando City SC	Waivers	US	Free	March 17, 2017	
7	ST	(Venezuela) Josef Martínez	(Italy) Torino	Transfer	Non-US	$4.5 Million (DP)	March 21, 2017 (Note: Atlanta United activated the option in the loan contract with Torino to buy Martínez.)	
12	DF	(United States) Bobby Boswell	(United States) D.C. United	Trade	US	Received in exchange for 2019 third round draft pick	August 8, 2017	

==== Draft picks ====
Draft picks are not automatically signed to the team roster. Only those who are signed to a contract will be listed as transfers in.

2017 Atlanta United SuperDraft Picks
Round	Selection	Player	Position	College	Status
1	2	(United States) Miles Robinson	DF	Syracuse	US
1	8	(Germany) Julian Gressel	MF	Providence College	Non-US
3	46	(United States) Andrew Wheeler-Omiunu	MF	Harvard	US
4	68	(United States) Alex Kapp	GK	Creighton	US

==== Loan in ====
No.	Pos.	Player	Loaned from	US	Start	End	Source
4	DF	(United States) Greg Garza	(Mexico) Tijuana	US	December 23, 2016	December 31, 2017	
11	MF	(Argentina) Yamil Asad	(Argentina) Vélez Sarsfield	Non-US	January 12, 2017	December 31, 2017	
26	MF	(England) Anton Walkes	(England) Tottenham Hotspur	Non-US	January 26, 2017	December 31, 2017	
7	ST	(Venezuela) Josef Martínez	(Italy) Torino	Non-US	February 2, 2017	March 20, 2017	
33	ST	(United States) Lagos Kunga	(United States) Charleston Battery	US	June 28, 2017 (Note: On June 17, 2017 Kunga, then an Atlanta United Academy player, signed a Homegrown Player (HGP) contract with the senior team effective on January 1, 2018. On June 28, 2017 he signed with Atlanta United's USL affiliate Charleston Battery for the remainder of the season, and was subsequently loaned to Atlanta United on a Short Term Agreement for the club's U.S. Open Cup match against Miami FC later that day.)	July 2, 2017	

=== Out ===
Per Major League Soccer and club policies terms of the deals do not get disclosed.

No.	Pos.	Player	Transferred to	Type	US	Fee/notes	Date	Source
—	GK	(United States) Sean Johnson	(United States) New York City FC	Trade	US	Received GAM & TAM	December 11, 2016	
—	GK	(United States) Clint Irwin	(Canada) Toronto FC	Trade	US	Received Mark Bloom & GAM	December 13, 2016	
—	DF	(United States) Donny Toia	(United States) Orlando City SC	Trade	US	Received Orlando's 2017 first round draft pick	December 13, 2016	
—	MF	(El Salvador) Junior Burgos	(United States) Reno 1868	Option Declined	US	Free	December 16, 2016	
31	FW	(Honduras) Bryan Róchez	(Portugal) Nacional	Waived	US	Free	August 22, 2017	

==== Loan out ====
No.	Pos.	Player	Loaned to	Start	End	Source
23	GK	(Greece) Alex Tambakis	(United States) Charleston Battery	January 26, 2016	November 30, 2016	
23	GK	(Greece) Alex Tambakis	(United States) Charleston Battery	May 24, 2017	End of season	
–	MF	(El Salvador) Junior Burgos	(United States) Tampa Bay Rowdies	February 2, 2016	November 30, 2016	
31	FW	(Ghana) Jeffrey Otoo	(United States) Charleston Battery	June 2, 2016	November 30, 2016	
31	FW	(Ghana) Jeffrey Otoo	(United States) Charleston Battery	March 2, 2017	End of season	
30	MF	(United States) Andrew Carleton	(United States) Charleston Battery	July 13, 2016	November 30, 2016	
9	FW	(Trinidad and Tobago) Kenwyne Jones	(Trinidad and Tobago) Central	June 24, 2016	December 31, 2016	
15	MF	(Paraguay) Héctor Villalba	(Mexico) Tijuana	July 29, 2016	December 31, 2016	
16	MF	(Republic of Ireland) Chris McCann	(England) Coventry City	August 2, 2016	December 31, 2016	
33	FW	(Jamaica) Romario Williams	(United States) Charleston Battery	March 2, 2017	End of season	
13	MF	(England) Harrison Heath	(United States) Sacramento Republic	June 30, 2017	July 31, 2017	

=== Non-player transfers ===
Acquired	From	For	Source
Discovery rights for Miguel Almirón	(United States) Seattle Sounders FC	$50,000 in GAM	
Additional international roster slot – 2017 & 2018	(United States) Colorado Rapids	2017 second round draft pick	
Discovery rights for Greg Garza	(United States) Columbus Crew	GAM	
$75,000 in TAM	(United States) San Jose Earthquakes	Additional international roster slot – 2017	

== Honors ==
=== Weekly / Monthly ===
==== MLS player of the month ====
Month	Player	Stats	Ref
March	(Venezuela) Josef Martínez	3 GP, 5 G	
September	(Venezuela) Josef Martínez (2)	7 GP, 9 G	

==== MLS team / player / coach of the week ====
Week	Team of the week		Player of the week	Coach of the week	Ref
Week	Starter	Bench	Player of the week	Coach of the week	Ref
2	(Paraguay) Miguel Almirón (United States) Greg Garza (Venezuela) Josef Martínez		(Venezuela) Josef Martínez	(Argentina) Gerardo Martino	
3	(United States) Greg Garza (2) (Venezuela) Josef Martínez (2)				
6	(Paraguay) Héctor Villalba	(Paraguay) Miguel Almirón (2)			
8	(Paraguay) Miguel Almirón (3)				
11		(Germany) Julian Gressel			
12	(Paraguay) Miguel Almirón (4)		(Paraguay) Miguel Almirón		
13	(Paraguay) Miguel Almirón (5)	(Argentina) Leandro González Pírez (Germany) Julian Gressel (2)	(Paraguay) Miguel Almirón (2)		
16	(Paraguay) Miguel Almirón (6)			(Argentina) Gerardo Martino (2)	
17		(Argentina) Leandro González Pírez (2) (Venezuela) Josef Martínez (3)			
18	(United States) Michael Parkhurst				
19	(Venezuela) Josef Martínez (4)				
20	(United States) Brad Guzan				
21		(Paraguay) Héctor Villalba (2)			
27	(Paraguay) Miguel Almirón (7) (Argentina) Leandro González Pírez (3)				
28	(Paraguay) Miguel Almirón (8) (Venezuela) Josef Martínez (5)	(Argentina) Yamil Asad	(Venezuela) Josef Martínez (2)		
29	(Argentina) Yamil Asad (2)	(Argentina) Leandro González Pírez (4) (United States) Jeff Larentowicz			
30	(United States) Michael Parkhurst (2)				
31		(Chile) Carlos Carmona			
32	(United States) Jeff Larentowicz (2)	(United States) Brad Guzan (2)			

==== MLS goal / save of the week ====
Week	Goal of the week	Save of the week	Ref
3	(Venezuela) Josef Martínez		
12	(Paraguay) Miguel Almirón		
13	(Paraguay) Héctor Villalba		
16	(Paraguay) Miguel Almirón (2)		
27	(United States) Greg Garza		
28	(Germany) Kevin Kratz		
32		(United States) Brad Guzan	
33		(United States) Brad Guzan (2)	

=== Annual ===
Honor	Player	Ref
MLS All-Star Game	(Paraguay) Miguel Almirón (United States) Greg Garza (United States) Michael Parkhurst	
MLS Best XI	(Paraguay) Miguel Almirón (Venezuela) Josef Martínez	
MLS Rookie of the Year	(Germany) Julian Gressel	
MLS Newcomer of the Year	(Paraguay) Miguel Almirón	
MLS Goal of the Year	(Paraguay) Héctor Villalba	
MLS Save of the Year	(United States) Brad Guzan	
