= Miguel Almirón =

Paraguayan footballer (born 1994)

- Almirón with Paraguay in 2026

Personal information
- Full name: Miguel Ángel Almirón Rejala
- Date of birth: 10 February 1994 (age 32)
- Place of birth: San Pablo, Paraguay
- Height: 1.74 m (5 ft 9 in)
- Positions: Attacking midfielder; winger

Team information
- Current team: Atlanta United
- Number: 10

Youth career
- 2008–2012: Cerro Porteño

Senior career*
Years	Team	Apps	(Gls)
2013–2015	Cerro Porteño	39	(6)
2015–2016	Lanús	35	(3)
2016–2019	Atlanta United	62	(21)
2019–2025	Newcastle United	186	(23)
2025–	Atlanta United	58	(13)

International career^{‡}
	Paraguay U17	10	(7)
2012–2013	Paraguay U20	16	(2)
2015–	Paraguay	84	(12)
- * Club domestic league appearances and goals as of 13:19, 15 November 2026 (UTC) ‡ National team caps and goals as of 23:47, 17 November 2026 (UTC)

Miguel Ángel Almirón Rejala (born 10 February 1994) is a Paraguayan professional footballer who plays as an attacking midfielder or right winger for Major League Soccer club Atlanta United and the Paraguay national team.

Almirón began his career at Cerro Porteño and transferred to Lanús in 2015. After winning the 2016 Argentine Primera División, he signed for Atlanta United for $8 million. He was named in the MLS Best XI for both of his seasons in Major League Soccer, as well as MLS Newcomer of the Year for 2017. After helping Atlanta to the MLS Cup in 2018, Almirón signed for Premier League side Newcastle United for £21 million, a club record and the highest fee for an MLS player. He played 223 games and scored 30 goals for Newcastle, and received an EFL Cup medal for playing in rounds before the 2025 final. In January 2025, Almirón returned to Atlanta United.

Almirón made his international debut for Paraguay in 2015, and represented the country at the Copa América in 2016, 2019, 2021, and 2024, as well as at the 2026 FIFA World Cup.

== Early life ==
Miguel Almirón was born into an impoverished family in the San Pablo neighbourhood of Asunción, where his father Ruben worked 18-hour shifts as a security guard and his mother Sonia worked in a supermarket. He trained with Club 3 de Noviembre from the age of seven and trialed with other teams but was considered "too frail" by his coaches to become a professional footballer. The seven members of his household slept in three bedrooms, and he had to share a bed with his mother until he was 18.

== Club career ==
=== Cerro Porteño ===
Rejected from Club Nacional for being too lightweight, Almirón moved to Cerro Porteño. His new club still had reservations about his physique, and he did not play regularly until he was on their under-17 side.

=== Lanús ===
In August 2015, Almirón signed for Club Atlético Lanús in the Argentine Primera División. Introduced slowly in his first season by Lanús manager Guillermo Barros Schelotto, Almirón came to the forefront the next season in the shortened 2016 Argentine Primera División under Jorge Almirón (no relation). Playing as an advanced central midfielder, Almirón was pivotal in Lanús' 2016 Argentine Primera División title win, scoring key goals against local rivals Banfield in the Clásico del Sur, and later in the final against San Lorenzo. A few months later, in August 2016, Almirón set-up the only goal in Lanús' Copa Bicentenario victory over Racing.

=== Atlanta United FC ===
On 5 December 2016, Almirón signed with the new Major League Soccer expansion team Atlanta United FC. He joined as a "Young Designated Player" and Atlanta paid a transfer fee of around $8 million to Lanús. The club also paid $50,000 in general allocation money to Seattle Sounders FC, who held the MLS discovery rights to Almirón.

Almirón was an important figure in Atlanta United's first season, described as the "heartbeat" of the team by veteran teammate Jeff Larentowicz. On 12 March, Almirón scored his first goals for the club, notching a brace in the club's second game, a 6–1 victory over fellow MLS newcomers Minnesota United FC. He scored the second hat-trick in club history on 20 May against the Houston Dynamo, and scored two goals a week later against New York City FC. Almirón joined teammates Greg Garza and Michael Parkhurst in the MLS All-Star Game on 2 August, and topped the league's list of 24 players under the age of 24, released on 28 September. During the regular season, Almirón was named to seven Teams of the Week by Major League Soccer, and was named Player of the Week twice. At the end of the season, he was named to the league's Best XI and was named Newcomer of the Year.

In April 2018, Almirón was named MLS Player of the Month for his five goals and two assists as Atlanta went unbeaten with three wins and a draw. With 12 goals and 14 assists, he was again named in the MLS Best XI, alongside teammate Josef Martínez. Atlanta won MLS Cup 2018 against the Portland Timbers in only their second season of existence, and Almirón was named in the Team of the 2018 MLS Cup Playoffs.

=== Newcastle United ===
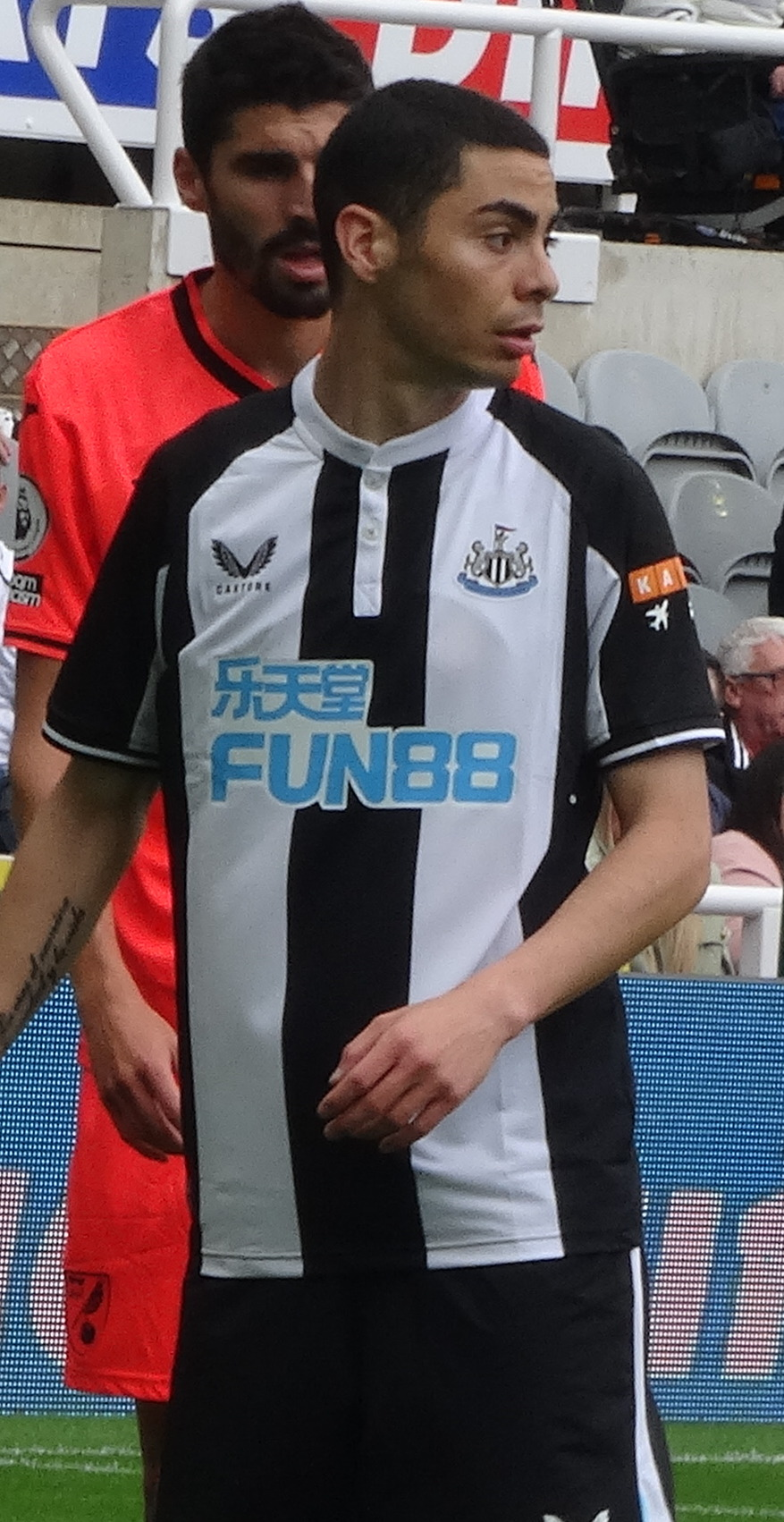
Almirón playing for Newcastle United in 2021

On 31 January 2019, Almirón joined Premier League side Newcastle United for an undisclosed fee on a five-and-a-half-year deal. The transfer fee was believed to be around £21 million, at the time a club record, and a record for an MLS player. He made his Premier League debut on 11 February in a 1–1 draw at Wolverhampton Wanderers, playing the final 18 minutes in place of Christian Atsu. Fans and media likened Almirón to Santiago Muñez, a fictional Newcastle player from the film Goal! who also originated from Latin America and moved to St James' Park via the United States. During a match against Southampton on 20 April, he was tackled by Oriol Romeu and suffered a hamstring injury that ruled him out for the rest of the season. Almirón struggled to score in his first months with Newcastle, but helped his side to avoid relegation. After registering 40 shots with no goals, he scored his first Premier League goal on 21 December in a 1–0 victory over Crystal Palace. He finished the season with a club-best eight goals in all competitions.

On 6 February 2021, Almirón scored twice in a 3–2 home win over Southampton, a game in which he ran 11.29 km, the most on his team. He then scored four goals in his last 12 Premier League games, the same as he scored in the 55 before that.

On 21 August 2022, Almirón broke a goal-scoring drought by scoring an equalizer against Manchester City, following a cross from Newcastle teammate Allan Saint-Maximin. In October, Almirón scored six goals in six matches, with two goals against Fulham, and one each against Brentford, Everton, Tottenham Hotspur and Aston Villa, reaching seven Premier League goals for the season, the most in his time in the Premier League. Following that success, he won Premier League Player of the Month for October 2022 and Premier League Goal of the Month for his first-half goal against Fulham. On 6 November, Almirón continued his scoring run with the opening goal against Southampton in a 4–1 victory, scoring his seventh goal in as many games, one more than in his previous 74 Premier League appearances. The next weekend against Chelsea, his scoring run came to an end, but he assisted Joe Willock for the only goal of the game.

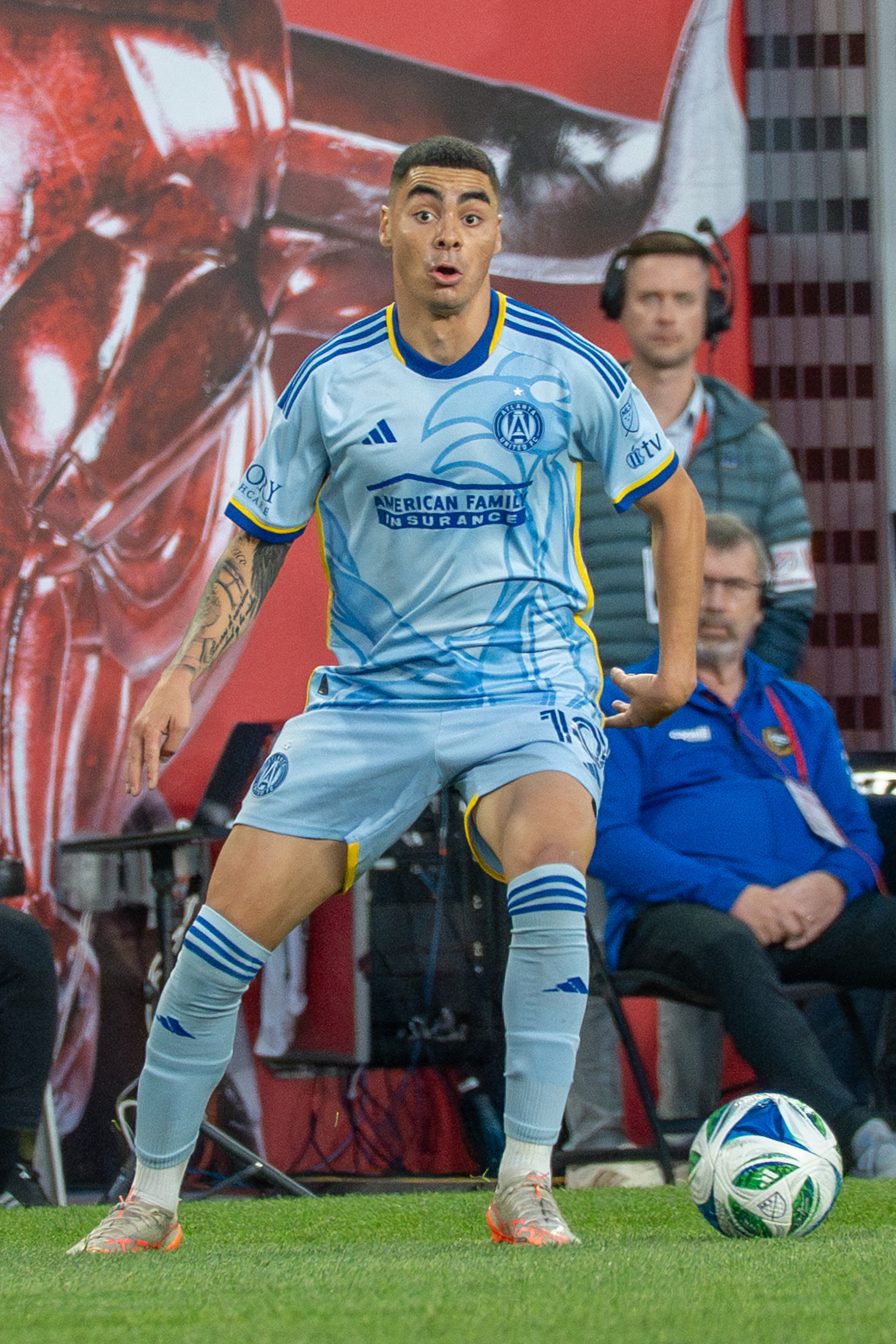
Miguel Almirón with Atlanta United in 2025

On 24 February 2023, Almirón signed a new three-and-a-half-year contract with the club. On 4 October of the same year, he scored his first goal in the UEFA Champions League, becoming the ninth Paraguayan player to score in the competition and putting Newcastle ahead 1–0 against Paris Saint-Germain in an eventual 4–1 win. His goal was Newcastle's first in the competition in over 20 years, since Alan Shearer scored in 2003. In March 2025, after Almirón had left the club, Newcastle United won the EFL Cup. As he had played four games in the cup campaign prior to leaving, Almirón received a winners medal.

=== Return to Atlanta United ===
On 30 January 2025, Almirón rejoined Atlanta United. The club paid $400,000 in general allocation money to Charlotte FC, who had acquired the MLS discovery rights to Almirón.

== International career ==
Almiron with Paraguay at the 2026 FIFA World Cup

Almirón played for the Paraguay under-20 national team in the 2013 South American Youth Football Championship in Argentina, and was highly involved as his team finished second to Colombia. Later that year, he was called up for the 2013 FIFA U-20 World Cup in Turkey, where Paraguay reached the last 16.

On 5 September 2015, Almirón made his senior international debut in a 3–2 friendly loss away to Chile, playing the final nine minutes in place of Jonathan Fabbro. Manager Ramón Díaz called him up the following May for the Copa América Centenario in the United States, where he started two matches in a group-stage exit.

In March 2019, in a friendly against Mexico at Levi's Stadium, Almirón came on as a substitute. Seven minutes later, he received a straight red card for a foul on José Juan Vázquez in which he dragged his studs down the back of the opponent's leg. He scored his first goal for Paraguay during the 4–2 victory against Jordan on 10 September 2019, and on 10 October 2019, he was sent off for diving in a 1–0 friendly loss to Serbia.

Almirón was selected in the 26-man squad for the 2026 FIFA World Cup. He started Paraguay's opening group-stage match against the United States, a 4–1 defeat, in which he was shown a yellow card for simulation. The card was initially given to American defender Tim Ream, but was transferred to Almirón following a VAR review, as a new regulation was enacted for the first time. In Paraguay's second group match against Turkey, he became the first player to be sent off under FIFA's new law prohibiting players from covering their mouths during confrontations with opponents, receiving a straight red card after a VAR review following an altercation with Mert Müldür in the stoppage time of the first half. He was also handed a one-match suspension following the incident. However, there was victory for Paraguay as they defeated Turkey 1-0.

== Personal life ==
Almirón has Christian messages tattooed on his arms. He married his high school sweetheart, Alexia Notto, who is a dancer, Zumba instructor, and influencer. The marriage took place on 29 August 2016, and on 6 June 2021, they welcomed their first child, Francesco.

== Career statistics ==
=== Club ===
As of match played 7 November 2026

Appearances and goals by club, season and competition
Club	Season	League			National cup (Note: Includes Copa Argentina, Supercopa Argentina, U.S. Open Cup, FA Cup)		League cup (Note: Includes EFL Cup)		Continental		Other		Total	
Club	Season	Division	Apps	Goals	Apps	Goals	Apps	Goals	Apps	Goals	Apps	Goals	Apps	Goals
Cerro Porteño	2013	Paraguayan Primera División	6	1	—		—		0	0	—		6	1
Cerro Porteño	2014	Paraguayan Primera División	14	0	—		—		1 (Note: Appearance(s) in Copa Sudamericana)	0	—		15	0
Cerro Porteño	2015	Paraguayan Primera División	19	5	—		—		1 (Note: Appearance in Copa Libertadores)	0	—		20	5
Cerro Porteño	Total		39	6	—		—		2	0	—		41	6
Lanús	2015	Argentine Primera División	10	0	1	0	—		3	1	—		14	1
Lanús	2016	Argentine Primera División	13	3	1	0	—		2	0	1 (Note: Appearance in Copa Bicentenario)	0	17	3
Lanús	2016–17	Argentine Primera División	12	0	2	0	—		0	0	—		14	0
Lanús	Total		35	3	4	0	—		5	1	1	0	45	4
Atlanta United FC	2017	Major League Soccer	30	9	1	0	—		—		1 (Note: Appearance(s) in MLS Cup playoffs)	0	32	9
Atlanta United FC	2018	Major League Soccer	32	12	1	0	—		—		5	1	38	13
Atlanta United FC	Total		62	21	2	0	—		—		6	1	70	22
Newcastle United	2018–19	Premier League	10	0	—		—		—		—		10	0
Newcastle United	2019–20	Premier League	36	4	6	4	0	0	—		—		42	8
Newcastle United	2020–21	Premier League	34	4	1	0	4	1	—		—		39	5
Newcastle United	2021–22	Premier League	30	1	1	0	1	0	—		—		32	1
Newcastle United	2022–23	Premier League	34	11	1	0	6	0	—		—		41	11
Newcastle United	2023–24	Premier League	33	3	3	0	3	1	6 (Note: Appearances in UEFA Champions League)	1	—		45	5
Newcastle United	2024–25	Premier League	9	0	1	0	4	0	—		—		14	0
Newcastle United	Total		186	23	13	4	18	2	6	1	–		223	30
Atlanta United FC	2025	Major League Soccer	31	6	—		—		—		2 (Note: Appearances in Leagues Cup)	0	33	6
Atlanta United FC	2026	Major League Soccer	27	7	1	0	—		—		—		28	7
Atlanta United FC	Total		58	13	1	0	—		—		2	0	61	13
Career total			380	66	20	4	18	2	13	2	9	1	439	75

=== International ===
As of match played 17 November 2026

Appearances and goals by national team and year
National team	Year	Apps	Goals
Paraguay	2015	1	0
Paraguay	2016	6	0
Paraguay	2017	5	0
Paraguay	2018	2	0
Paraguay	2019	12	2
Paraguay	2020	3	0
Paraguay	2021	11	1
Paraguay	2022	8	3
Paraguay	2023	5	1
Paraguay	2024	11	1
Paraguay	2025	9	1
Paraguay	2026	11	3
Total		84	12

As of match played 27 September 2026. Paraguay score listed first, score column indicates score after each Almirón goal.

List of international goals scored by Miguel Almirón
No.	Date	Venue	Cap	Opponent	Score	Result	Competition
1	10 September 2019	Amman International Stadium, Amman, Jordan	23	Jordan	2–2	4–2	Friendly
2	14 November 2019	Vasil Levski National Stadium, Sofia, Bulgaria	25	Bulgaria	1–0	1–0	Friendly
3	24 June 2021	Estádio Nacional Mané Garrincha, Brasília, Brazil	34	Chile	2–0	2–0	2021 Copa América
4	24 March 2022	Estadio Antonio Aranda, Ciudad del Este, Paraguay	43	Ecuador	3–0	3–1	2022 FIFA World Cup qualification
5	10 June 2022	Suwon World Cup Stadium, Suwon, South Korea	45	South Korea	1–0	2–2	Friendly
6	10 June 2022	Suwon World Cup Stadium, Suwon, South Korea	45	South Korea	2–0	2–2	Friendly
7	18 June 2023	Estadio Defensores del Chaco, Asuncion, Paraguay	49	Nicaragua	1–0	2–0	Friendly
8	19 November 2024	Estadio Municipal de El Alto, El Alto, Bolivia	64	Bolivia	1–1	2–2	2026 FIFA World Cup qualification
9	10 October 2025	Suita City Football Stadium, Suita, Japan	70	Japan	1–0	2–2	2025 Kirin Challenge Cup
10	5 June 2026	Estadio Defensores del Chaco, Asunción, Paraguay	76	Nicaragua	2–0	4–0	Friendly
11	27 September 2026	Audi Field, Washington, D.C., United States	81	Bolivia	1–0	2–0	Friendly
12	27 September 2026	Audi Field, Washington, D.C., United States	81	Bolivia	2–0	2–0	Friendly

== Honours ==
Cerro Porteño

- Paraguayan Primera División: 2013 Clausura, 2015 Apertura

Lanús

- Argentine Primera División: 2016
- Copa Bicentenario: 2016

Atlanta United

- MLS Cup: 2018

Newcastle United

- EFL Cup: 2024–25; runner-up: 2022–23

Individual

- Paraguayan Footballer of the Year (ABC Color vote): 2017, 2018, 2022
- Paraguayan Footballer of the Year (Public vote): 2017, 2022
- MLS Best XI: 2017, 2018
- MLS Newcomer of the Year: 2017
- MLS All-Star: 2017, 2018
- MLS Player of the Month: April 2018
- Premier League Player of the Month: October 2022
- Premier League Goal of the Month: April 2022, October 2022
