= San Pablo (Asunción) =

Coordinates: 25.324985°S 57.578757°W

- Barrio
- Interactive map of San Pablo
- Country: Paraguay
- City: Asunción
- District: La Recoleta

Area
  - Total: 3.07 km^{2} (1.19 sq mi)

Population (2002)
  - Total: 21,787
  - Rank: 1st
  - Density: 7,100/km^{2} (18,400/sq mi)
- Patron saint: Saint Paul

San Pablo (Spanish for Saint Paul) is a neighbourhood of Asunción, Paraguay.

== Demographics ==
According to the last census made by the DGEEC, the governmental institution that runs censuses and official surveys in the country, in 2002, San Pablo is the most populated neighbourhood in the city, with 21.787 inhabitants.
