= 2017 MLS All-Star Game =

Soccer game played in Chicago, Illinois

2017 MLS All-Star Game Presented by Target
Target All-Star Chicago '17
- Event: 2017 Major League Soccer season
MLS All-Stars	Real Madrid
(United States) (Canada)	(Spain)
1	1
- Real Madrid won 4–2 on penalties
- Date: August 2, 2017
- Venue: Soldier Field, Chicago, Illinois
- Most Valuable Player: Borja Mayoral (Real Madrid)
- Referee: Allen Chapman (United States)
- Attendance: 61,428

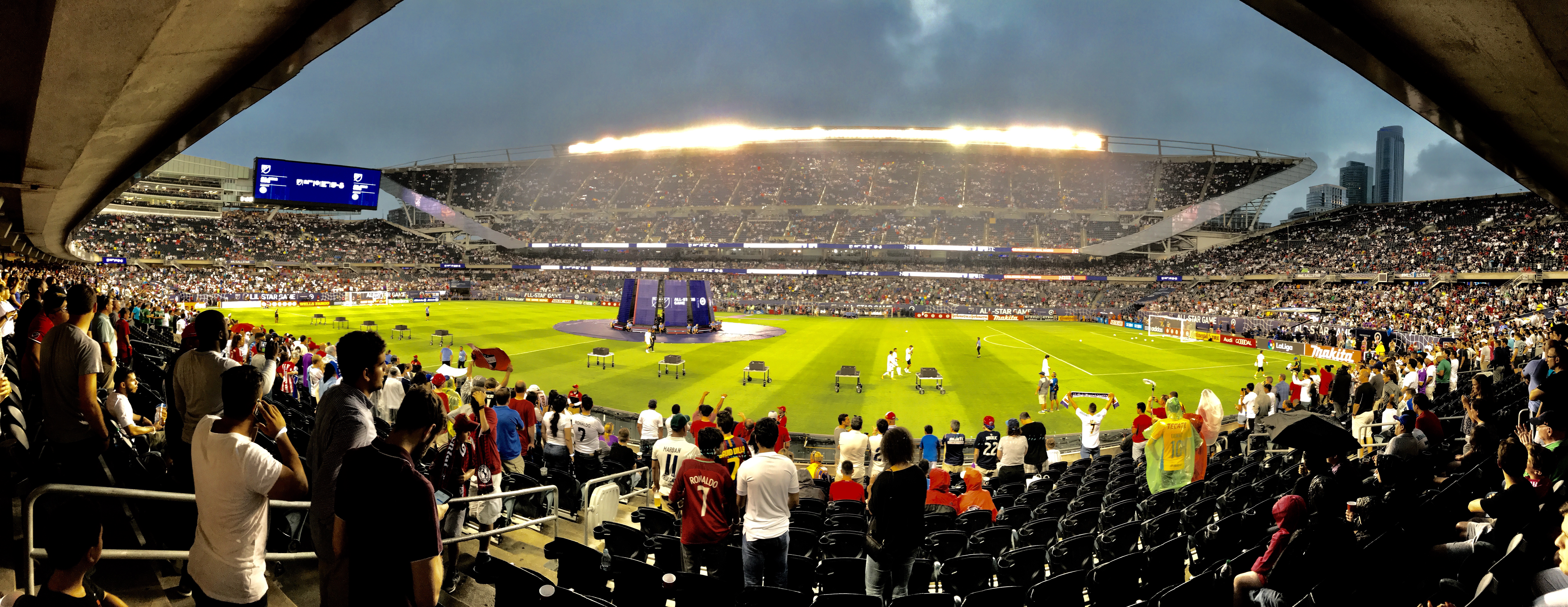
The scene inside Soldier Field prior to the start of the match

The 2017 Major League Soccer All-Star Game was the 22nd annual Major League Soccer All-Star Game. The game took place on August 2, 2017 (7:30 p.m. local time) at Soldier Field in Chicago. The game was televised live on Fox Sports 1 and Univision in the United States, and on TSN and TVA Sports in Canada. La Liga side Real Madrid were the opponents. Real Madrid won 4–2 on penalties following a 1–1 draw in normal time.

Borja Mayoral was named MVP.

== Squads ==
=== MLS All-Stars ===
Tim Howard, DaMarcus Beasley, Graham Zusi, Greg Garza, Miguel Almirón, Michael Bradley, Kaká, Bastian Schweinsteiger, David Villa, and Nemanja Nikolić were voted to the MLS All-Star Fan XI, announced on July 7, 2017. Sebastian Giovinco was chosen as the FIFA 17 More Than A Vote Winner. Stefan Frei, Jelle van Damme, Hernán Grana, Matt Hedges, Johan Kappelhof, Michael Parkhurst, Dax McCarty, Diego Valeri, Giovani dos Santos, Ignacio Piatti, and Jozy Altidore were selected as coach Veljko Paunović's picks on July 18. Dom Dwyer and Kellyn Acosta were announced as Commissioner Don Garber's picks for the squad.

Note: Flags indicate national team as defined under FIFA eligibility rules; some limited exceptions apply. Players may hold more than one non-FIFA nationality.

No.	Pos.	Nation	Player
1	GK	USA	Tim Howard (Colorado Rapids)
2	DF	ARG	Hernán Grana (FC Dallas)
3	DF	USA	Michael Parkhurst (Atlanta United FC)
4	MF	USA	Michael Bradley (Toronto FC)
5	FW	ITA	Sebastian Giovinco (Toronto FC)
6	MF	USA	Dax McCarty (Chicago Fire)
7	FW	ESP	David Villa (New York City FC)
8	DF	USA	Graham Zusi (Sporting Kansas City)
9	MF	ARG	Diego Valeri (Portland Timbers)
10	MF	BRA	Kaká (Orlando City SC)
11	MF	MEX	Giovani dos Santos (LA Galaxy)
12	DF	USA	DaMarcus Beasley (Houston Dynamo)

No.	Pos.	Nation	Player
14	FW	USA	Dom Dwyer (Orlando City SC)
15	DF	USA	Greg Garza (Atlanta United FC)
16	DF	NED	Johan Kappelhof (Chicago Fire)
17	FW	USA	Jozy Altidore (Toronto FC)
21	DF	USA	Matt Hedges (FC Dallas)
22	FW	HUN	Nemanja Nikolić (Chicago Fire)
23	MF	USA	Kellyn Acosta (FC Dallas)
24	GK	SUI	Stefan Frei (Seattle Sounders FC)
26	MF	PAR	Miguel Almirón (Atlanta United FC)
28	MF	ARG	Ignacio Piatti (Montreal Impact)
31	MF	GER	Bastian Schweinsteiger (Chicago Fire) (captain)
37	DF	BEL	Jelle Van Damme (LA Galaxy)

- Manager: (Serbia) Veljko Paunović (Chicago Fire)

Notes:

^{a} Injured or otherwise unable to play.

=== Real Madrid ===
Real Madrid's 26-man United States squad was announced on July 11, 2017. However, Álvaro Morata and Danilo later withdrew from the squad following their transfers to Chelsea and Manchester City, respectively.

Note: Flags indicate national team as defined under FIFA eligibility rules; some limited exceptions apply. Players may hold more than one non-FIFA nationality.

No.	Pos.	Nation	Player
1	GK	CRC	Keylor Navas
2	DF	ESP	Dani Carvajal
3	DF	ESP	Jesús Vallejo
4	DF	ESP	Sergio Ramos (captain)
5	DF	FRA	Raphaël Varane
6	DF	ESP	Nacho
8	MF	GER	Toni Kroos
9	FW	FRA	Karim Benzema
10	MF	CRO	Luka Modrić
11	FW	WAL	Gareth Bale
12	DF	BRA	Marcelo
13	GK	ESP	Kiko Casilla
14	MF	BRA	Casemiro

No.	Pos.	Nation	Player
15	DF	FRA	Théo Hernandez
16	MF	CRO	Mateo Kovačić
17	FW	ESP	Lucas Vázquez
18	MF	ESP	Marcos Llorente
20	MF	ESP	Marco Asensio
21	FW	ESP	Borja Mayoral
22	MF	ESP	Isco
24	MF	ESP	Dani Ceballos
25	GK	ESP	Rubén Yáñez
27	DF	ESP	Álvaro Tejero
30	GK	FRA	Luca Zidane
32	MF	ESP	Óscar
34	DF	MAR	Achraf Hakimi

- Manager: (France) Zinedine Zidane

== Match ==
2017 MLS All-Star Game
August 2, 2017
7:30 p.m. CDT

MLS All-Stars (United States) (Canada)	1–1	(Spain) Real Madrid
Dwyer 87'	Report	Mayoral 59'
Penalties
Dwyer (penalty missed); Dos Santos (penalty missed); Valeri (penalty scored); Almirón (penalty scored)	2–4	(penalty scored) Benzema; (penalty scored) Bale; (penalty scored) Kovačić; (penalty scored) Marcelo

Soldier Field, Chicago, Illinois
Attendance: 61,428
Referee: Allen Chapman (United States)

MLS All-Stars
Real Madrid

GK	1	(United States) Tim Howard	(substituted off) 45'
DF	8	(United States) Graham Zusi	(substituted off) 45'
DF	16	(Netherlands) Johan Kappelhof	(substituted off) 45'
DF	37	(Belgium) Jelle Van Damme	(substituted off) 45'
DF	15	(United States) Greg Garza	(substituted off) 7'
MF	4	(United States) Michael Bradley	(substituted off) 45'
MF	31	(Germany) Bastian Schweinsteiger (c)	(substituted off) 45'
MF	10	(Brazil) Kaká	(substituted off) 45'
FW	7	(Spain) David Villa	(substituted off) 45'
FW	17	(United States) Jozy Altidore	(substituted off) 31'
FW	44	(Italy) Sebastian Giovinco	(substituted off) 45'
Substitutes:
GK	24	(Switzerland) Stefan Frei	(substituted on) 45'
DF	12	(United States) DaMarcus Beasley	(substituted on) 7' (substituted off) 45'
DF	3	(United States) Michael Parkhurst	(substituted on) 45'
DF	2	(Argentina) Hernán Grana	(substituted on) 45'
DF	21	(United States) Matt Hedges	(substituted on) 45'
DF	23	(United States) Kellyn Acosta	(substituted on) 45'
MF	11	(Mexico) Giovani dos Santos	(substituted on) 62'
MF	6	(United States) Dax McCarty	(substituted on) 73'
MF	9	(Argentina) Diego Valeri	(substituted on) 45'
MF	26	(Paraguay) Miguel Almirón	(substituted on) 45'
FW	28	(Argentina) Ignacio Piatti	(substituted on) 31' (substituted off) 62'
FW	14	(United States) Dom Dwyer	(substituted on) 45'
FW	22	(Hungary) Nemanja Nikolić	(substituted on) 45'
Manager:
(Serbia) Veljko Paunović

GK	1	(Costa Rica) Keylor Navas	(substituted off) 45'
DF	15	(France) Théo Hernandez	(substituted off) 61'
DF	4	(Spain) Sergio Ramos (c)	(substituted off) 45'
DF	6	(Spain) Nacho	(substituted off) 72'
DF	34	(Morocco) Achraf Hakimi	(substituted off) 61'
MF	8	(Germany) Toni Kroos	(substituted off) 45'
MF	18	(Spain) Marcos Llorente	(substituted off) 61'
MF	22	(Spain) Isco	(substituted off) 61'
FW	20	(Spain) Marco Asensio	(substituted off) 61'
FW	21	(Spain) Borja Mayoral	(substituted off) 61'
FW	17	(Spain) Lucas Vázquez	(substituted off) 72'
Substitutes:
GK	13	(Spain) Kiko Casilla
GK	25	(Spain) Rubén Yáñez	(substituted on) 45' (substituted off) 72'
GK	30	(France) Luca Zidane	(substituted on) 72'
DF	2	(Spain) Dani Carvajal	(substituted on) 61'
DF	5	(France) Raphaël Varane
DF	16	(Croatia) Mateo Kovačić	(substituted on) 61'
DF	3	(Spain) Jesús Vallejo	(substituted on) 45'
DF	27	(Spain) Álvaro Tejero	(substituted on) 72'
MF	10	(Croatia) Luka Modrić
MF	12	(Brazil) Marcelo	(substituted on) 61'
MF	14	(Brazil) Casemiro	(substituted on) 61'
MF	24	(Spain) Dani Ceballos	(substituted on) 45'
FW	9	(France) Karim Benzema	(substituted on) 61'
FW	11	(Wales) Gareth Bale	(substituted on) 61'
FW	32	(Spain) Óscar	(substituted on) 72'
Manager:
(France) Zinedine Zidane

Most valuable player:
(Spain) Borja Mayoral (Real Madrid)

Assistant referees:
Adam Wienckowski
Jeremy Hanson
Fourth official:
José Carlos Rivero

Match rules

- 90 minutes.
- Unlimited substitutions.
- No extra time.
- Penalty shoot-out if scores still level.
