= Chris Goslin =

American soccer player (born 2000)

Personal information
- Full name: Christopher Khaleel Goslin
- Date of birth: May 12, 2000 (age 26)
- Place of birth: Kingston, Jamaica
- Height: 1.70 m (5 ft 7 in)
- Position: Midfielder

Youth career
- 2015–2016: Georgia United

Senior career*
Years	Team	Apps	(Gls)
2017–2019	Atlanta United	0	(0)
2017	→ Charleston Battery (loan)	1	(0)
2018–2019	→ Atlanta United 2 (loan)	23	(0)
2021–2022	FK Senica	6	(0)
Total		30	(0)

International career^{‡}
2015–2017	United States U17	9	(0)
- * Club domestic league appearances and goals as of 06:23, September 6, 2021(UTC) ‡ National team caps and goals as of 28 May 2017

Christopher Khaleel Goslin (born May 12, 2000) is a former soccer player. Born in Jamaica, he has represented the United States at youth level.

== Early life ==
Goslin was born in Kingston, Jamaica before moving to Locust Grove, Georgia, in the United States when he was four years old.

== Professional career ==
On October 6, 2016, Goslin signed with Major League Soccer side Atlanta United FC as a Home Grown Player. He signed on a short-term loan deal with United Soccer League side Charleston Battery in May 2017. He made his league debut for Charleston on May 28, 2017, in a 2–1 away loss to New York Red Bulls II. Goslin was subbed off in the 80th minute, being replaced by Ataullah Guerra. He made his main squad debut on June 6, 2018, being subbed on for Ezequiel Barco in the 85th minute in Atlanta United's U.S. Open Cup match against Charleston Battery.

After two years of being without a club, Goslin signed with Slovak Super Liga side FK Senica on July 22, 2021.
