= Greg Garza =

American soccer player (born 1991)

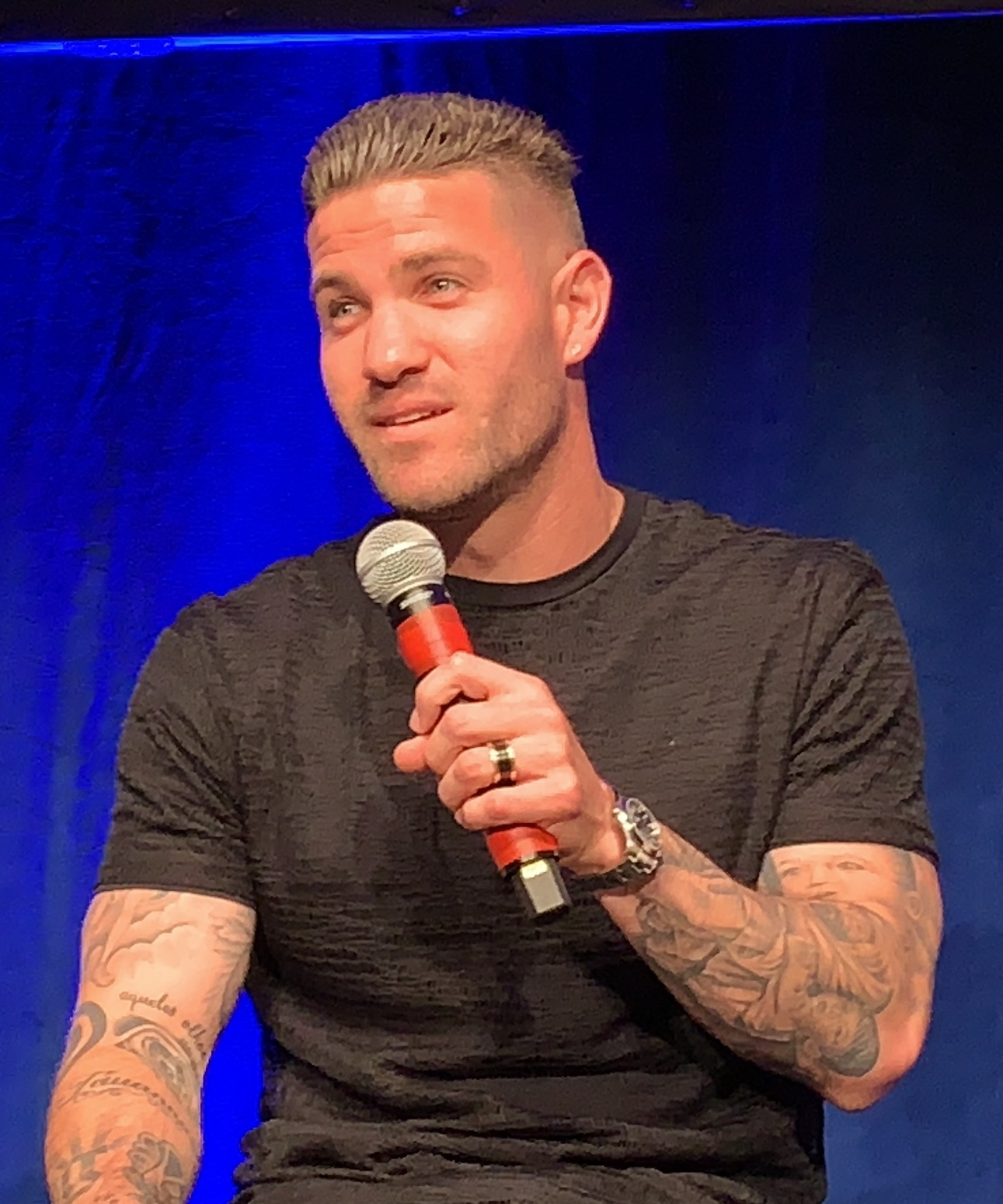
- Garza at an FC Cincinnati event in 2019

Personal information
- Full name: Gregory Martin Garza
- Date of birth: August 16, 1991 (age 35)
- Place of birth: Grapevine, Texas, United States
- Height: 5 ft 8 in (1.72 m)
- Position: Left-back

Youth career
- 2005–2006: São Paulo
- 2007–2008: Dallas Texans
- 2008–2010: Sporting CP

Senior career*
Years	Team	Apps	(Gls)
2010–2011	Estoril Praia	3	(0)
2012–2017	Tijuana	66	(3)
2015	→ Atlas (loan)	3	(0)
2017	→ Atlanta United (loan)	26	(2)
2018	Atlanta United	11	(1)
2019–2020	FC Cincinnati	22	(0)
Total		131	(6)

International career
2011	United States U20	3	(0)
2014–2017	United States	10	(0)
- * Club domestic league appearances and goals

Gregory "Greg" Martin Garza (born August 16, 1991) is an American former professional soccer player who played as a left-back.

== Club career ==
=== Estoril Praia ===
Garza spent several years with Sporting Clube de Portugal's under-19 team, but he was not offered a contract with the senior squad. As a result, he moved to Estoril Praia on a two-year contract in August 2010.

=== Club Tijuana ===
Garza signed with Mexican Primera División side Club Tijuana on December 21, 2011. Garza made his debut coming in as a sub in minute 73 for José Sand against Monarcas Morelia in a 1–1 tied game. He scored the first goal of his career for the club on October 13, 2012, in a 2–2 draw at Santos Laguna.

=== Atlanta United ===
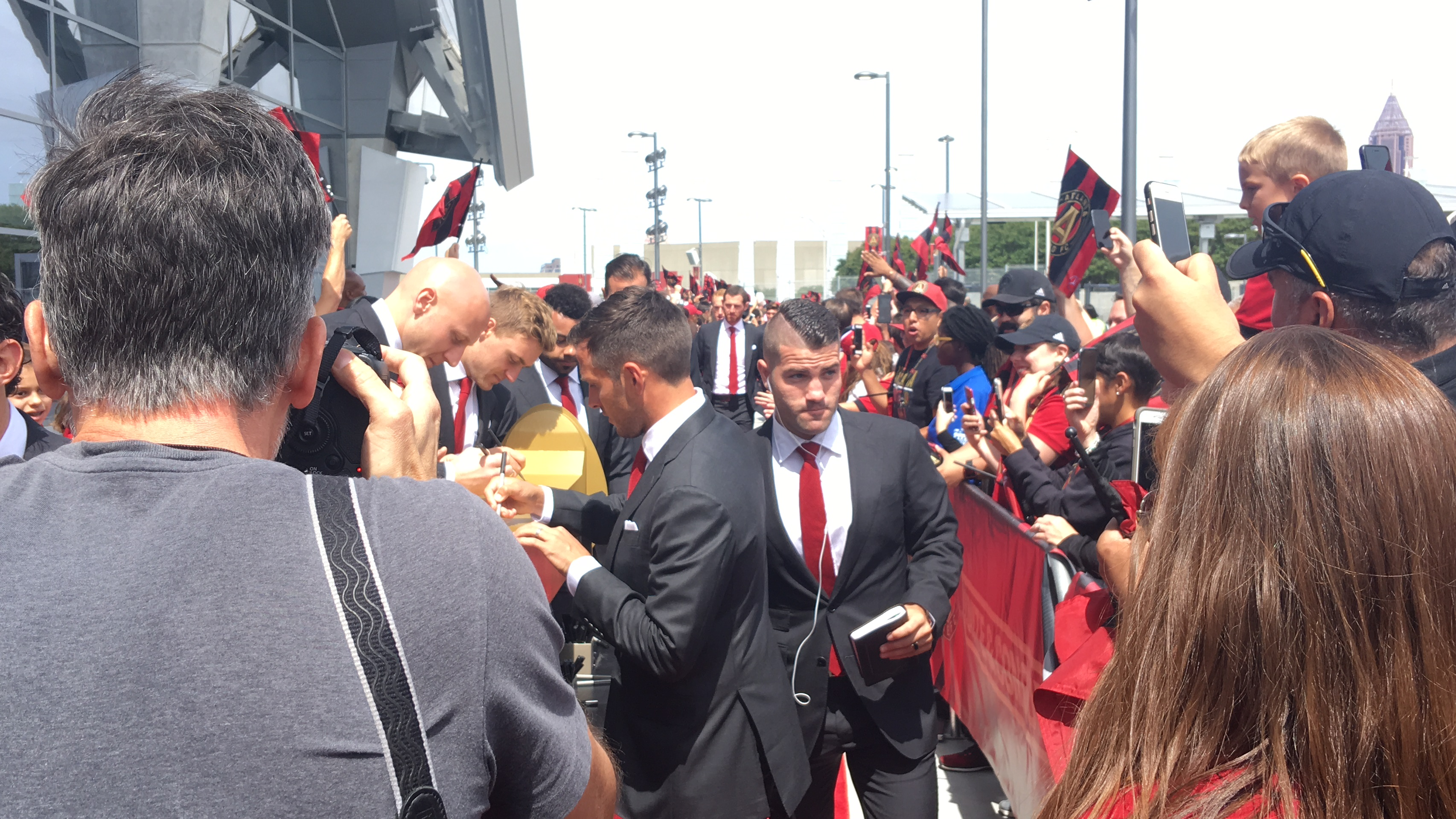
Greg Garza, Atlanta United September 10, 2017

In December 2016 it was announced that Garza had signed a one-year loan deal with newly formed side Atlanta United for the 2017 season. Atlanta acquired Garza's MLS right from Columbus Crew SC in exchange for a second-round pick in the 2018 MLS SuperDraft.

On November 29, 2017, Atlanta announced that it had signed Garza to a permanent multi-year deal. Greg Garza made $175,008 for the 2018 MLS Season.

=== FC Cincinnati ===
On December 11, 2018, Atlanta United announced that the club had traded Garza to FC Cincinnati in exchange for $250,000 of Targeted Allocation Money (TAM) and $200,000 of General Allocation Money (GAM) to be used toward the acquisition of new players.

=== Retirement ===
On April 23, 2021, Garza announced his retirement from professional soccer at the age of 29. He cited his struggles with various injuries as the reason for his retirement. Since retirement, Garza maintains his connection with soccer through volunteering with local youth soccer clubs. In 2021 Garza founded a soccer mentoring organization, Beyond Goals Mentoring along with former Atlanta United teammate Michael Parkhurst.

== International career ==
Garza was announced as part of the United States senior squad for a friendly against the Czech Republic on September 3, 2014. His first senior international cap was recorded during the match, being subbed on in the 62nd minute. He was capped-tied to the U.S. national team after his first competitive match in the 2015 CONCACAF Gold Cup against Haiti, while starting and playing 67 minutes. But after the group stage he was traded out of the gold cup roster for DaMarcus Beasley as each team could make six changes if they advanced to the knockout round.

== Personal life ==
Garza was born and raised in Texas but holds a Mexican passport by way of his father who was born in Mexico.

== Career statistics ==
As of March 17, 2018

Appearances and goals by club, season and competition
Club	Season	League			National cup		League cup		Other		Total	
Club	Season	Division	Apps	Goals	Apps	Goals	Apps	Goals	Apps	Goals	Apps	Goals
Estoril	2010–11	Liga de Honra	3	0	—		1	0	—		4	0
Tijuana	2011–12	Mexican Primera División	5	0	—		—		—		5	0
Tijuana	2012–13	Liga MX	10	2	7	0	—		4	0	21	2
Tijuana	2013–14	Liga MX	19	0	—		—		6	0	25	0
Tijuana	2014–15	Liga MX	30	1	1	0	—		—		31	1
Tijuana	2016–17	Liga MX	2	0	—		—		—		2	0
Tijuana	Total		66	3	8	0	—		10	0	84	3
Atlas (loan)	2015–16	Liga MX	3	0	2	0	—		—		5	0
Atlanta United (loan)	2017	Major League Soccer	26	2	—		—		—		26	2
Atlanta United	2018	Major League Soccer	2	0	—		—		—		2	0
Career total			100	5	10	0	1	0	10	0	121	5

== Honors ==
Tijuana

- Liga MX: Apertura 2012

Atlanta United

- MLS Cup: 2018
- MLS All-Star: 2017
