= List of foreign MLS players =

This is a list of foreign players in Major League Soccer. The following players:

1. Have played at least one MLS regular season game. Players who were signed by MLS clubs, but only played in playoff games, U.S. Open Cup games, or did not play in any competitive games at all, are not included.
2. Are considered foreign, i.e., outside Canada or the United States determined by the following:

A player is considered foreign if he is not eligible to play for the national team of Canada or the United States.

More specifically,

- If a player has been capped on international level, the national team is used; if he has been capped by more than one country, the highest level (or the most recent) team is used. These include American and Canadian players with dual citizenship.
- If a player has not been capped on international level, his country of birth is used, except those who were born abroad from American or Canadian parents, or moved to Canada or the United States at a young age, and those who clearly indicated to have switched his nationality to another nation.

Up to now, 143 different nations have been represented in MLS.

In bold: players who have played at least one MLS game in the most recent season (2026 Major League Soccer season), and are still at the clubs for which they have played. This does not include current players of a MLS club who have not played a MLS game in the current season.

== Africa (CAF) ==
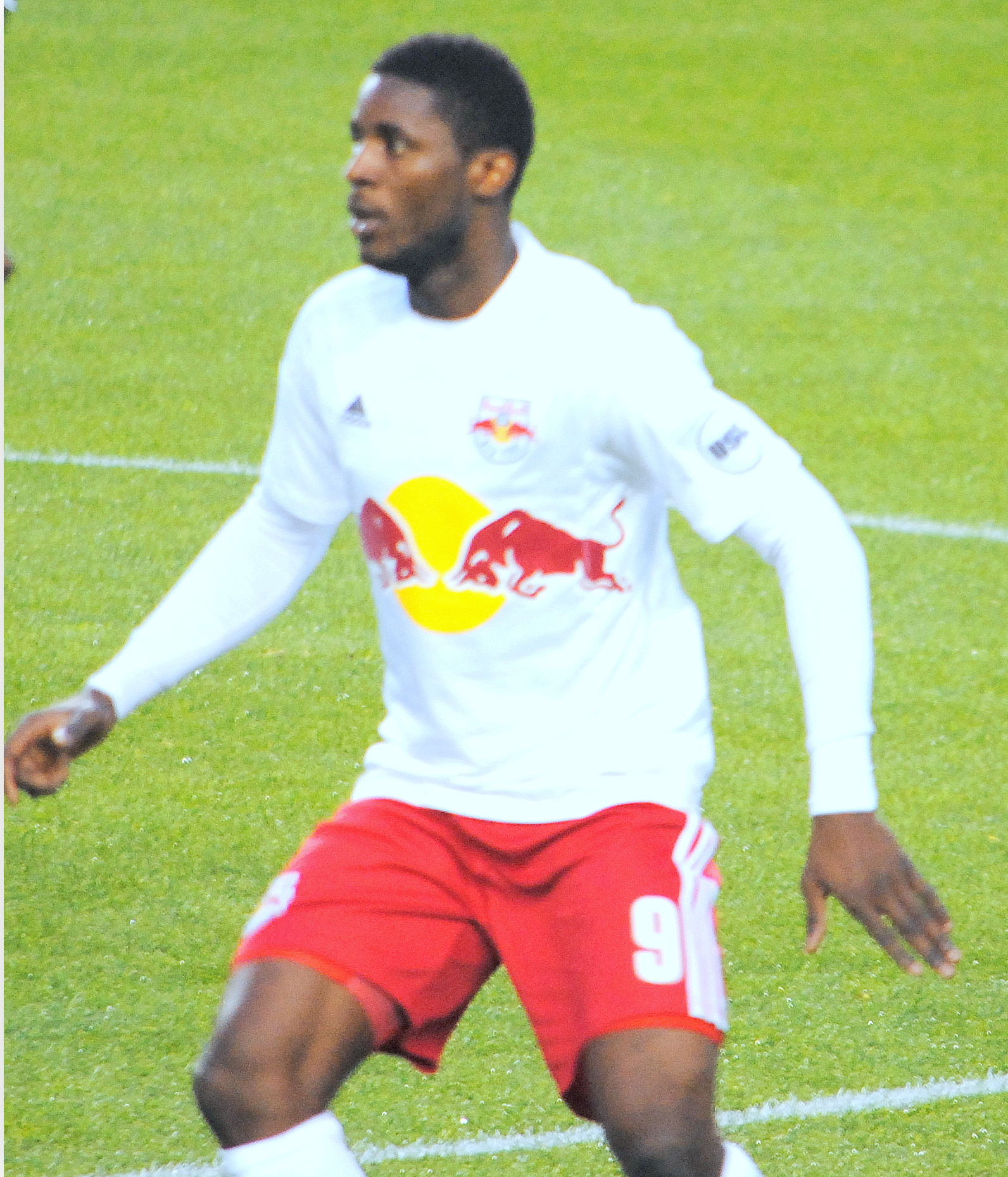
Anatole Abang

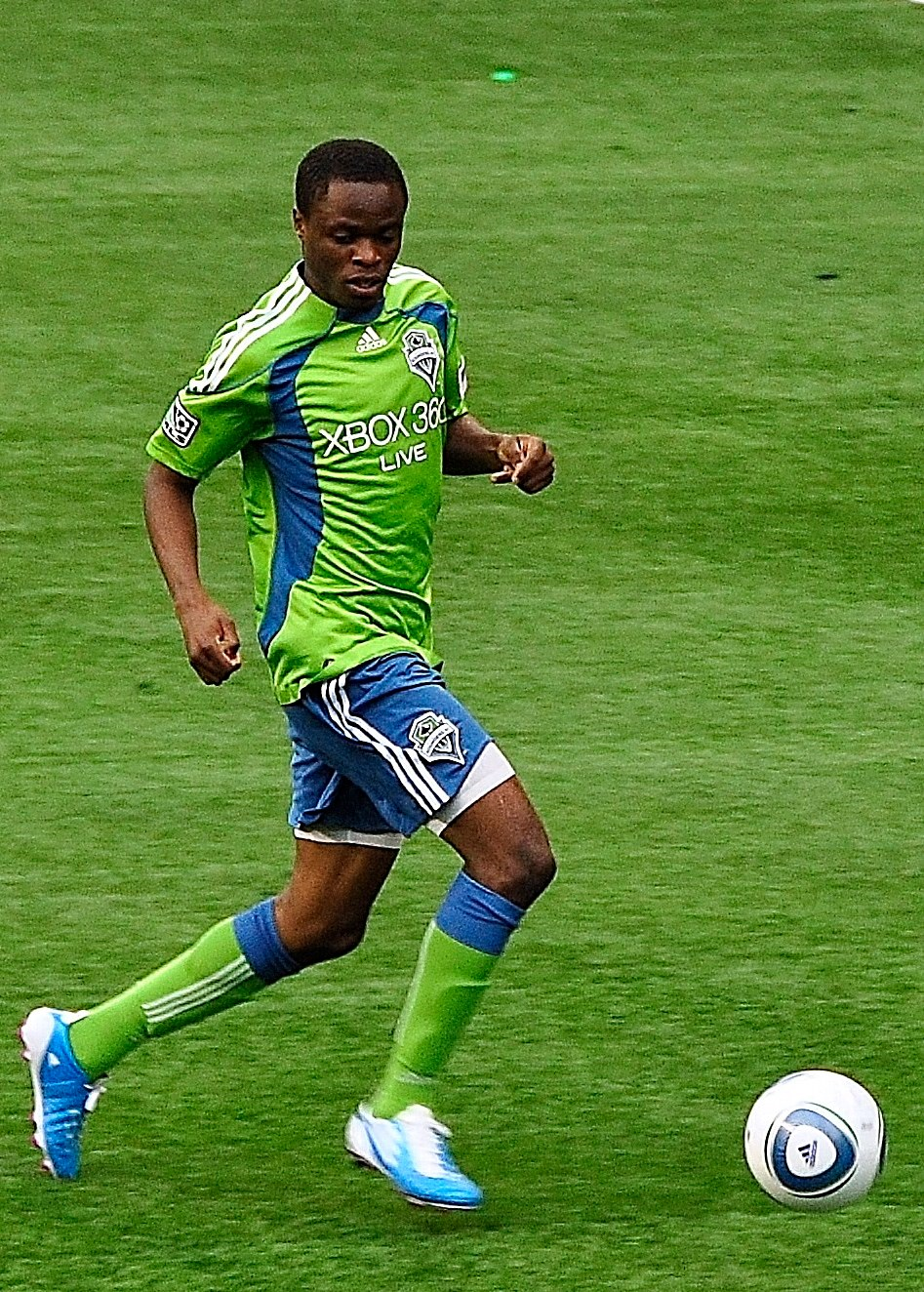
Steve Zakuani

=== Central Africa ===
Country	Name	Birthplace	Most recent MLS team	Former MLS team(s)	Notes	Refs
Angola	Edgar Bartolomeu	Angola	MetroStars (2003)			
Angola	**Capita**	Luanda, Angola	**Kansas City** (2026–present)			
Angola	Fernando Fernandes	Angola	MetroStars (1999)			
Angola	Bruno Gaspar	Portugal	Vancouver (2021)		Capped for Portugal's national U15, U16, U18 and U21 football teams	
Angola	**Rui Modesto**	Vendas Novas, Portugal	**Vancouver** (2026–present)			
Angola	Jerson Monteiro	Angola	Chicago (2007)			
Angola	Show	Luanda, Angola	Dallas (2024–25)			
Cameroon	Anatole Abang	Yaoundé, Cameroon	New York Red Bulls (2015–16)			
Cameroon	Daouda Amadou		Colorado (2025)			
Cameroon	**Brian Anunga**	Yaoundé, Cameroon	**Cincinnati** (2025–present)	Nashville (2020–2024)		
Cameroon	Stephane Assengue	Douala, Cameroon	New England (2009)			
Cameroon	Yazid Atouba	Yaoundé, Cameroon	Chicago (2013)			
Cameroon	Eric Ayuk	Yaoundé, Cameroon	Philadelphia (2015–16)			
Cameroon	Aaron Bibout	Yaoundé, Cameroon	LA Galaxy (2023)			
Cameroon	**Eric Maxim Choupo-Moting**	Hamburg, West Germany	**New York Red Bulls** (2025–present)		Capped for Germany's national U19 and U21 football teams	
Cameroon	Samuel Ekemé	Kumba, Cameroon	Kansas City (1996)			
Cameroon	Charles Eloundou	Yaoundé, Cameroon	Colorado (2014–15)			
Cameroon	Boris Enow		D.C. United (2024–25)			
Cameroon	Ignatius Ganago	Douala, Cameroon	New England (2025)			
Cameroon	Wilfrid Kaptoum	Douala, Cameroon	New England (2021–22)			
Cameroon	Olivier Mbaizo	Douala, Cameroon	Philadelphia (2018–26)			
Cameroon	Matthew Mbuta	Bamenda, Cameroon	New York Red Bulls (2008–09)			
Cameroon	Alexandre Morfaw	Douala, Cameroon	Vancouver (2011)			
Cameroon	Joseph Nane	Yaoundé, Cameroon	Colorado (2011–12)	Toronto (2010)		
Cameroon	Hassan Ndam	Foumban, Cameroon	New York Red Bulls (2017–18, 2022–23)			
Cameroon	J.C. Ngando	Douala, Cameroon	Vancouver (2023, 2025–26)			
Cameroon	Alain N'Kong	Yaoundé, Cameroon	Chicago (2005–06)			
Cameroon	**David Nyangono**		**San Diego** (2026–present)			
Cameroon	Marius Obekop	Yaoundé, Cameroon	New York Red Bulls (2013–15)			
Cameroon	Ambroise Oyongo	Ndikiniméki, Cameroon	Montreal (2015–17)	New York Red Bulls (2014)		
Cameroon	Frantz Pangop	Douala, Cameroon	Minnesota (2018)			
Cameroon	Franck Songo'o	Yaoundé, Cameroon	Portland (2012)		Capped for France's national U19 football team	
Cameroon	Tony Tchani	Douala, Cameroon	Chicago (2018)	New York Red Bulls (2010–11), Toronto (2011), Columbus (2011–17), Vancouver (2017)	Capped for the United States men's national soccer team	
Cameroon	**Nouhou Tolo**	Douala, Cameroon	**Seattle** (2017–present)			
Central African Republic	Wilfried Zahibo	Marseille, France	Houston (2020)	New England (2018–20)		
DR Congo (Democratic Republic of the Congo)	**Cédric Bakambu**	Vitry-sur-Seine, France	**San Diego** (2026–present)		Capped for France's national U18, U19, U20 football teams	
DR Congo (Democratic Republic of the Congo)	Dimitry Imbongo	Kinshasa, Zaire	New England (2012–14)			
DR Congo (Democratic Republic of the Congo)	Larrys Mabiala	Montfermeil, France	Portland (2017–24)		Capped for France's national U21 football team	
DR Congo (Democratic Republic of the Congo)	Cedrick Mabwati	Kinshasa, Zaire	Columbus (2015–16)			
DR Congo (Democratic Republic of the Congo)	Chris Mavinga	Meaux, France	LA Galaxy (2023)	Toronto (2017–22)	Capped for France's national U18, U19, U20 and U21 football teams	
DR Congo (Democratic Republic of the Congo)	Danny Mwanga	Kinshasa, Zaire	Orlando (2015)	Philadelphia (2010–12), Portland (2012), Colorado (2013–14)		
DR Congo (Democratic Republic of the Congo)	Ange N'Silu	Kinshasa, Zaire	D.C. United (2009)			
DR Congo (Democratic Republic of the Congo)	Michee Ngalina	Kinshasa, DR Congo	Los Angeles FC (2021)	Philadelphia (2019)		
DR Congo (Democratic Republic of the Congo)	Steve Zakuani	Kinshasa, Zaire	Portland (2014)	Seattle (2009–13)		
Equatorial Guinea	Carlos Akapo	Elche, Spain	San Jose (2023–24)			
Gabon	**Denis Bouanga**	Le Mans, France	**Los Angeles FC** (2022–present)			
Gabon	Aaron Boupendza	Moanda, Gabon	Cincinnati (2023–24)			
Congo (Republic of the Congo)	**Philippe Ndinga**	Libreville, Gabon	**Philadelphia** (2026–present)			

=== East Africa ===
Country	Name	Birthplace	Most recent MLS team	Former MLS team(s)	Notes	Refs
Burundi	Irakoze Donasiyano	Kigoma Region, Tanzania	Nashville (2021)			
Eritrea	Henok Goitom	Solna, Sweden	San Jose (2016)		Capped for Sweden's U21 football team	
Eritrea	Mohammed Saeid	Örebro, Sweden	Colorado (2017)	Columbus (2015–16), Minnesota (2017)		
Ethiopia	Fuad Ibrahim	Bik'a, Ethiopia	Toronto (2008–10)		Capped for the US national U17 and U20 soccer teams	
Kenya	Nabilai Kibunguchy	Elk Grove, US	Minnesota (2022)		Capped for the US men's national U19 soccer team	
Kenya	Lawrence Olum	Nairobi, Kenya	Minnesota (2019)	Kansas City (2011–14), Portland (2017–18)		
Kenya	Victor Wanyama	Nairobi, Kenya	Montreal (2020–24)			
Madagascar	Romain Métanire	Metz, France	Minnesota (2019–22)			
Madagascar	Rayan Raveloson	Anosibe Ifanja, Madagascar	LA Galaxy (2021–22)			
Mozambique	Chiquinho Conde	Beira, Mozambique	Tampa Bay (1997)	New England (1997)		
Mozambique	Tico-Tico	Lourenço Marques, Mozambique	Tampa Bay (2000)			
Rwanda	Phanuel Kavita	Lubumbashi, Zaire	Salt Lake (2015–16)			
Rwanda	Jojea Kwizera	Bukavu, DR Congo	Montréal (2022–23)			
Rwanda	Abdul Rwatubyaye	Kigali, Rwanda	Kansas City (2019)			
Seychelles	Michael Mancienne	Feltham, UK	New England (2018–20)		Capped for England's men's national U16, U17, U18, U19 and U21 football teams	
Somalia	Siad Haji	Kakuma, Kenya	San Jose (2019–22)		Capped for the US national U15, U17 and U19 soccer teams	
Somalia	Handwalla Bwana	Mombasa, Kenya	Nashville (2020–22)	Seattle (2018–20)		
Somalia	Abdi Salim	Nairobi, Kenya	Orlando (2023)			
South Sudan	Machop Chol	Khartoum, Sudan	Atlanta (2021–23)			
Tanzania	Cyprian Kachwele	Shinyanga, Tanzania	Vancouver (2024)			
Tanzania	Nizar Khalfan	Mtwara, Tanzania	Vancouver (2011)			
Uganda	Micheal Azira	Kampala, Uganda	Chicago (2019–20)	Seattle (2014–15), Colorado (2016–18), Montreal (2018–19)		
Uganda	Tenywa Bonseu	Kampala, Uganda	MetroStars (2004)	Chicago (2000), Columbus (2001), Dallas (2002–03)		
Uganda	Peter Byaruhanga	Kampala, Uganda	Kansas City (2000)			
Uganda	Ibrahim Kasule	Buikwe, Uganda	New York Red Bulls (2023)			
Uganda	Joel Kitamirike	Kampala, Uganda	Columbus (2006)			
Uganda	Edward Kizza	Kampala, Uganda	New England (2021)			
Uganda	Mustafa Kizza	Kampala, Uganda	Montreal (2020–21)			
Uganda	Noble Okello	Toronto, Canada	Toronto (2020–22)		Capped for the Canada national Canada national team and U17, U20 and U21 soccer teams	
Uganda	Allan Oyirwoth	Amor, Uganda	New England (2025)			
Uganda	Ibrahim Sekagya	Kampala, Uganda	New York Red Bulls (2013–14)			
Uganda	Robert Ssejjemba	Kampala, Uganda	D.C. United (2006)			
Uganda	Steven Sserwadda	Kampala, Uganda	New York Red Bulls (2022)			
Uganda	Brian Umony	Jinja, Uganda	Portland (2011)			
Zambia	Aimé Mabika	Lusaka, Zambia	Toronto (2023–24)	Inter Miami (2021–23)		
Zimbabwe	Mubarike Chisoni	Bulawayo, Zimbabwe	LA Galaxy (2005)			
Zimbabwe	Kheli Dube	Bulawayo, Zimbabwe	New England (2008–11)			
Zimbabwe	Neathan Gibson	Bulawayo, Rhodesia	Colorado (2001)			
Zimbabwe	**Teenage Hadebe**	Bulawayo, Zimbabwe	**Cincinnati** (2024–present)	Houston (2021–2023)		
Zimbabwe	Joseph Ngwenya	Plumtree, Zimbabwe	D.C. United (2011)	LA Galaxy (2004–06), Columbus (2006–07), Houston (2007)		
Zimbabwe	Vitalis Takawira	Salisbury, Zimbabwe	Kansas City (1996–99)			

=== Northern Africa ===
Country	Name	Birthplace	Most recent MLS team	Former MLS team(s)	Notes	Refs
Algeria	Monsef Bakrar	Sétif, Algeria	New York City FC (2023–25)			
Algeria	**Mohamed Farsi**	Montreal, Canada	**Columbus** (2022–present)		Capped for Canada's men's national futsal and U23 soccer teams	
Algeria	Raïs M'Bolhi	Paris, France	Philadelphia (2014–15)		Capped for France's national U18 and U17 football teams	
Algeria	Saphir Taïder	Castres, France	Montreal (2018–20)		Capped for France's national U18, U19 and U20	
Egypt	Omar Gaber	Cairo, Egypt	Los Angeles FC (2018)			
Egypt	Ali Ghazal	Aswan, Egypt	Vancouver (2017–18)			
Egypt	Ahmed Hamdi	Cairo, Egypt	Montreal (2021–23)			
Egypt	Amro Tarek	Los Angeles, US	New York Red Bulls (2019–21)	Columbus (2016), Orlando (2018)		
Libya	Mohamed El Monir	Tripoli, Libya	Los Angeles FC (2019–20)	Orlando (2018–20)		
Libya	**Ayoub Lajhar**		**Cincinnati** (2026–present)			
Libya	Ismael Tajouri-Shradi	Bern, Switzerland	Minnesota (2023)	New York City FC (2018–21), Los Angeles FC (2022)		
Morocco	Mehdi Ballouchy	Casablanca, Morocco	New York City FC (2015–16)	Salt Lake (2006–07), Colorado (2007–10), New York Red Bulls (2010–12), San Jose (2012–13), Vancouver (2014)		
Morocco	Amine Bassi	Bezons, France	Houston (2023–25)			
Morocco	**Ayoub Jabbari**	Rabat, Morocco	**Cincinnati** (2025–present)			
Morocco	Ahmed Kantari	Blois, France	Toronto (2015)			
Morocco	Youness Mokhtar	Utrecht, Netherlands	Columbus (2019–20)		Capped for the Netherlands national U17 and U19 football teams	
Morocco	Adrien Regattin	Champigny-sur-Marne, France	Cincinnati (2020)			
Morocco	**Anass Zaroury**	Mechelen, Belgium	**Columbus** (2026–present)		Capped for the Belgium national U17, U18 and U21 football teams	
Morocco	Monsef Zerka	Orléans, France	New England (2011)			
Morocco	Taha Habroune	Columbus, US	Columbus (2023–present)		Capped for the US men's national U17, U19 and U20 soccer teams	
Tunisia	**Elias Achouri**	Saint-Denis, Réunion	**San Diego** (2026–present)			
Tunisia	**Rayan Elloumi**	St. Albert, Canada	**Vancouver** (2025–present)			
Tunisia	Jasser Khmiri	Tunis, Tunisia	Vancouver (2019–20)			
Tunisia	**Elias Saad**	Hamburg, Germany	**Nashville** (2026–present)		Capped for Germany's men's national futsal team	
Tunisia	Anisse Saidi	Camden, US	San Diego (2025–26)		Capped for the US national U15 soccer team	

=== Southern Africa ===
Country	Name	Birthplace	Most recent MLS team	Former MLS team(s)	Notes	Refs
Botswana	Dipsy Selolwane	Gaborone, Botswana	Salt Lake (2005)	Chicago (2002–05)		
South Africa	Stephen Armstrong	Birkenhead, UK	Columbus (2005)	D.C. United (2001), Kansas City (2002–03)		
South Africa	Derek Backman	South Africa	Tampa Bay (1996–97)			
South Africa	Shaun Bartlett	Cape Town, South Africa	MetroStars (1997)	Colorado (1996–97)		
South Africa	Njabulo Blom	Dobsonville, South Africa	St. Louis (2023–24)			
South Africa	Danleigh Borman	Cape Town, South Africa	Toronto (2011)	New York Red Bulls (2008–11)		
South Africa	**Puso Dithejane**	Christiana, South Africa	**Chicago** (2026–present)			
South Africa	Richard Farrer	Johannesburg, South Africa	Dallas (1996–02)			
South Africa	**Lyle Foster**	Soweto, South Africa	**Houston** (2026–present)			
South Africa	**Bongokuhle Hlongwane**	South Africa	**Minnesota** (2022–present)			
South Africa	Doctor Khumalo	Soweto, South Africa	Columbus (1996–97)			
South Africa	Thabiso Khumalo	Soweto, South Africa	D.C. United (2008–10)			
South Africa	Cassius Mailula	Ga-Molepo, South Africa	Toronto (2023–24)			
South Africa	Olwethu Makhanya	Durban, South Africa	Philadelphia (2025–26)			
South Africa	**Mbekezeli Mbokazi**	Hluhluwe, South Africa	**Chicago** (2026–present)			
South Africa	Ivan McKinley	Johannesburg, South Africa	D.C. United (2002)	Tampa Bay (1996–97), New England (1997–00), Miami Fusion (2000–01)		
South Africa	Lindo Mfeka	Durban, South Africa	San Jose (2017)			
South Africa	Kamohelo Mokotjo	Odendaalsrus, South Africa	Cincinnati (2020–21)			
South Africa	Toni Nhleko	Ermelo, South Africa	Dallas (2003–04)			
South Africa	**Tsiki Ntsabeleng**	Daveyton, South Africa	**Dallas** (2022–present)			
South Africa	Ethen Sampson	Mitchells Plain, South Africa	Vancouver (2014–15)			
South Africa	Davide Somma	Johannesburg, South Africa	San Jose (2008–09)			

=== West Africa ===
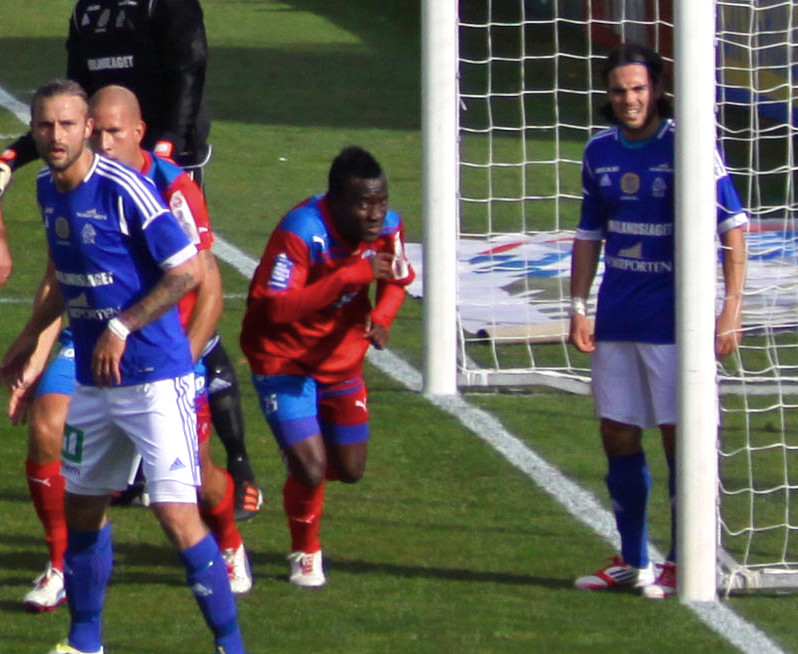
David Accam

Country	Name	Birthplace	Most recent MLS team	Former MLS team(s)	Notes	Refs
Benin	**Rodolfo Aloko**	Sô-Ava, Benin	**Charlotte** (2026–present)			
Benin	Femi Hollinger-Janzen	Cotonou, Benin	New England (2016–18)			
Benin	Cédric Hountondji	Toulouse, France	New York City FC (2018)		Capped for France's national U16, U17, U18 and U20	
Burkina Faso	**Ousseni Bouda**	Ouagadougou, Burkina Faso	**San Jose** (2022–present)			
Burkina Faso	**Georgi Minoungou**	Batiebly-Douibly, Ivory Coast	**Colorado** (2026–present)	Seattle (2024–2026)	Capped for Ivory Coast's national U20 football team	
Cape Verde	**CJ dos Santos**	Philadelphia, US	**San Diego** (2024–present)	Inter Miami (2022–2024)	Capped for the US men's national U17 and U20 soccer teams	
Cape Verde	Paulo Dos Santos	São Vicente, Cape Verde	New England (1999)			
Cape Verde	Jair	Cape Verde	Tampa Bay (2001)	New England (1998–99), San Jose (1999)		
Cape Verde	Jamiro Monteiro	Rotterdam, Netherlands	San Jose (2022–23)	Philadelphia (2020–21)		
Cape Verde	**Steven Moreira**	Noisy-le-Grand, France	**Columbus** (2021–present)		Capped for France's national U16, U19, U20 and U21 football teams	
Cape Verde	Kévin Oliveira	São Vicente, Cape Verde	Kansas City (2017)			
Cape Verde	Iuri Tavares	Lisbon, Portugal	Charlotte (2024–25)			
Gambia (The Gambia)	Mamadou Danso	Serrekunda, Gambia	Montreal (2014)	Portland (2009–10, 2011–14)		
Gambia (The Gambia)	Emmanuel Gómez	Dippa Kunda, Gambia	Toronto (2009)			
Gambia (The Gambia)	Modou Jadama	Serrekunda, Gambia	Portland (2018–19)			
Gambia (The Gambia)	Mustapha Jarju	Banjul, Gambia	Vancouver (2011)			
Gambia (The Gambia)	Omar Jasseh	Banjul, Gambia	San Jose (2010–11)			
Gambia (The Gambia)	Ismaila Jome	Banjul, Gambia	Portland (2021)	Minnesota, (2017)		
Gambia (The Gambia)	Kekuta Manneh	Bakau, Gambia	Austin (2021)	Vancouver (2013–17), Columbus (2017), Cincinnati (2019–20), New England (2020)		
Gambia (The Gambia)	Abdoulie Mansally	Banjul, Gambia	Houston (2016)	New England (2007–12), Salt Lake (2012–15)		
Gambia (The Gambia)	Sainey Nyassi	Bwiam, Gambia	D.C. United (2013)	New England (2007–13)		
Gambia (The Gambia)	Sanna Nyassi	Bwiam, Gambia	San Jose (2015–16)	Seattle (2009–10), Colorado (2011), Montreal (2012–14), Chicago (2014)		
Gambia (The Gambia)	Amadou Sanyang	Bakau, Gambia	Seattle (2011)	Toronto (2009–10)		
Gambia (The Gambia)	Omar Sowe	Serrekunda, Gambia	New York Red Bulls (2021)			
Ghana	Mohammed Abu	Accra, Ghana	D.C. United (2020)	Columbus (2017–18)		
Ghana	**Lalas Abubakar**	Kumasi, Ghana	**Dallas** (2025–present)	Columbus (2017–19), Colorado (2020–24)		
Ghana	David Accam	Accra, Ghana	Nashville (2020–21)	Chicago (2015–17), Philadelphia (2018–19), Columbus (2019)		
Ghana	Joe Addo	Accra, Ghana	MetroStars (2002–03)	Tampa Bay (1999–01)		
Ghana	Bismark Adjei-Boateng	Accra, Ghana	Colorado (2017–18)			
Ghana	Harrison Afful	Tema, Ghana	Charlotte (2022–23)	Columbus (2015–21)		
Ghana	Junior Agogo	Accra, Ghana	San Jose (2001)	Chicago (2000), Colorado (2000–01)		
Ghana	**Kwaku Agyabeng**		**Kansas City** (2026–present)			
Ghana	**Morrison Agyemang**	Accra, Ghana	**Charlotte** (2026–present)			
Ghana	Forster Ajago	Navrongo, Ghana	Salt Lake (2025)	Nashville (2024)		
Ghana	Kalif Alhassan	Accra, Ghana	Portland (2011–14)			
Ghana	**Ezekiel Alladoh**		**Philadelphia** (2026–present)			
Ghana	Eugene Ansah	Accra, Ghana	Dallas (2023–24)			
Ghana	Seth Antwi		St. Louis (2025)			
Ghana	Emmanuel Appiah	Sampa, Ghana	Kansas City (2016)			
Ghana	Samuel Appiah	Obuasi, Ghana	Houston (2010)			
Ghana	Isaac Atanga	Nkoranza, Ghana	Cincinnati (2021–22)			
Ghana	Francis Atuahene	Accra, Ghana	Dallas (2019) |			
Ghana	Gideon Baah	Accra, Ghana	New York Red Bulls (2016)			
Ghana	Fifi Baiden	Ajumako, Ghana	Columbus (2014)			
Ghana	Latif Blessing	Accra, Ghana	Houston (2024)	Kansas City (2017), Los Angeles FC (2018–22), New England (2023), Toronto (2023–24)		
Ghana	**Emmanuel Boateng**	Accra, Ghana	**San Diego** (2025–present)	LA Galaxy (2016–19), D.C. United (2019–20), Columbus (2020), New England (2021–24)		
Ghana	Joshua Bolma	Accra, Ghana	New England (2023)			
Ghana	Osman Bukari	Accra, Ghana	Austin (2024–25)			
Ghana	Abu Danladi	Takoradi, Ghana	Nashville (2020–21)	Minnesota (2017–19)		
Ghana	**Ronald Donkor**	Accra, Ghana	**New York Red Bulls** (2023–present)			
Ghana	**Manu Duah**	Accra, Ghana	**San Diego** (2025–present)			
Ghana	Edwin Gyasi	Amsterdam, Netherlands	Dallas (2019)			
Ghana	Salou Ibrahim	Kumasi, Ghana	New York Red Bulls (2010)			
Ghana	Sumed Ibrahim	Tamale, Ghana	Chicago (2004)			
Ghana	Samuel Inkoom	Sekondi-Takoradi, Ghana	D.C. United (2014)			
Ghana	Louis Ken-Kwofie	Ghana	MetroStars (1996)			
Ghana	Gershon Koffie	Koforidua, Ghana	New England (2017)	Vancouver (2011–15)		
Ghana	Nana Kuffour	Nyakrom, Ghana	D.C. United (2004–05)			
Ghana	**Willy Kumado**	Dansoman, Ghana	**San Diego** (2025–present)			
Ghana	Adam Larsen Kwarasey	Oslo, Norway	Portland (2015–16)		Capped for Norway's national U21 football team	
Ghana	Jonathan Mensah	Accra, Ghana	New England (2023)	Columbus (2017–22), San Jose (2023)		
Ghana	**Shak Mohammed**	Kumasi, Ghana	**Nashville** (2026–present)	Orlando (2024–25)		
Ghana	Patrick Nyarko	Kumasi, Ghana	D.C. United (2016–17)	Chicago (2008–15)		
Ghana	Anthony Obodai	Accra, Ghana	Houston (2010)			
Ghana	Dominic Oduro	Pramso, Ghana	San Jose (2018)	Dallas (2006–08), New York Red Bulls (2009), Houston (2009–11), Chicago (2011–12), Columbus (2013–14), Toronto (2014), Montreal (2015–18)		
Ghana	Ebenezer Ofori	Kumasi, Ghana	New York City FC (2018–19)			
Ghana	Kofi Opare	Mampong, Ghana	Colorado (2019)	LA Galaxy (2013–14), D.C. United (2014–18)		
Ghana	Edward Opoku	Konongo, Ghana	Columbus (2018)			
Ghana	Kwadwo Opoku	Accra, Ghana	Montréal (2023–26)	Los Angeles FC (2020–23)		
Ghana	Emmanuel Osei	Accra, Ghana	New England (2009–10)			
Ghana	Leonard Owusu	Accra, Ghana	Vancouver (2020–22)			
Ghana	**Prince Owusu**	Wertheim am Main, Germany	**Montréal** (2025–present)	Toronto (2023–24)	Capped for Germany's national U15, U18 and U19 football teams	
Ghana	Samuel Owusu	Kumasi, Ghana	New York City FC (2022)			
Ghana	**Joseph Paintsil**	Accra, Ghana	**LA Galaxy** (2024–present)			
Ghana	Kwadwo Poku	Kumasi, Ghana	New York City FC (2015–16)			
Ghana	**Ibrahim Sadiq**	Buduburam, Ghana	**Colorado** (2026–present)			
Ghana	Lloyd Sam	Leeds, UK	D.C. United (2016–17)	New York Red Bulls (2012–16)	Capped for England's national U20 football team	
Ghana	**Mohammed Sofo**	Accra, Ghana	**New York Red Bulls** (2024–present)			
Ghana	Samuel Tetteh	Accra, Ghana	New York Red Bulls (2020)			
Ghana	Ema Twumasi	Accra, Ghana	Dallas (2018–24)			
Ghana	**Maxwell Woledzi**	Accra, Ghana	**Nashville** (2026–present)			
Ghana	**Joshua Yaro**	Kumasi, Ghana	**St. Louis** (2023–present)	Philadelphia (2016–17)		
Ghana	Ishmael Yartey Swedru, Ghana	Portland (2015)				
Ghana	Yaw Yeboah	Accra, Ghana	Los Angeles FC (2025)	Columbus (2022–24)		
Guinea	Hadji Barry	Conakry, Guinea	Orlando (2016–17)			
Guinea	Lass Bangoura	Conakry, Guinea	Vancouver (2019)			
Guinea	**Sekou Bangoura**	Conakry, Guinea	**Columbus** (2026–present)			
Guinea	**Yadaly Diaby**	Saint-Pierre, Réunion	**Vancouver** (2026–present)			
Guinea	**Morgan Guilavogui**	Toulon, France	**Salt Lake** (2026–present)			
Guinea	Aboubacar Keita	New York City, New York, United States	Columbus (2019–2021)		Capped for USA national U20 football team	
Guinea	Florentin Pogba	Conakry, Guinea	Atlanta (2019)		Capped for France's national U20 football team	
Guinea-Bissau	Gerso Fernandes	Bissau, Guinea-Bissau	Kansas City (2017–20)			
Guinea-Bissau	Janio Bikel	Bissau, Guinea-Bissua	Vancouver (2020–21)		Capped for Portugal's national U19 and U20 football teams	
Guinea-Bissau	Nanu	Coimbra, Portugal	Dallas – 2022)			
Guinea-Bissau	Sambinha	Cascais, Portugal	New England (2016)			
Guinea-Bissau	**Ronaldo Vieira**	Bissau, Guinea-Bissau	**San Jose** (2025–present)		Capped for England's national U20 and U21 football teams	
Ivory Coast	Benjamin Angoua	Anyama, Ivory Coast	New England (2017)			
Ivory Coast	**Eric Bailly**	Bingerville, Ivory Coast	**Columbus** (2026–present)			
Ivory Coast	**Jonathan Bamba**	Alfortville, France	**Chicago** (2025–present)		Capped for France's national U16, U18, U20 and U21 football teams	
Ivory Coast	Franck Boli	Yamoussoukro, Ivory Coast	Portland (2023)			
Ivory Coast	Yannick Boli	Saint-Maur-des-Fossés, France	Colorado (2018)			
Ivory Coast	**Djé D'Avilla**	Attécoubé, Ivory Coast	**Chicago** (2025–present)			
Ivory Coast	Ousmane Doumbia	Adjamé, Ivory Coast	Chicago (2023)			
Ivory Coast	**Souleyman Doumbia**	Paris, France	**Charlotte** (2025–present)			
Ivory Coast	Didier Drogba	Abidjan, Ivory Coast	Montreal (2015–16)			
Ivory Coast	**Kevin Gbamblé**		**Columbus** (2026–present)			
Ivory Coast	Jean-Martial Kipré	Adjamé, Ivory Coast	Salt Lake (2007)			
Ivory Coast	Guy-Roland Kpene	Abidjan, Ivory Coast	D.C. United (2007)			
Ivory Coast	Emmanuel Latte Lath	Abidjan, Ivory Coast	Atlanta (2025–26)			
Ivory Coast	Aké Arnaud Loba	Divo, Ivory Coast	Nashville (2021–22)			
Ivory Coast	Arsène Oka	Abidjan, Ivory Coast	New England (2007)			
Ivory Coast	Gaoussou Samaké	Dabou, Ivory Coast	D.C. United (2022–23)			
Ivory Coast	Olivier Tébily	Abidjan, Ivory Coast	Toronto (2008)			
Ivory Coast	**Bénie Traoré**	Ouragahio, Ivory Coast	**New York City FC** (2026–present)			
Ivory Coast	**Wilfried Zaha**	Abidjan, Ivory Coast	**Charlotte** (2025–present)		Capped for England's men's national U19 and U21 football teams and the national team	
Ivory Coast	**Bryan Zamblé**		**San Diego** (2026–present)			
Ivory Coast	Abdoul Zanne	Abidjan, Ivory Coast	D.C. United (2022)			
Liberia	Michael Butler	Monrovia, Liberia	MetroStars (2001)			
Liberia	Louis Crayton	Monrovia, Liberia	D.C. United (2008–09)			
Liberia	Francis Doe	Monrovia, Liberia	D.C. United (2008–09)	New York Red Bulls (2007)		
Liberia	Jimmy Farkarlun	Monrovia Liberia	Austin (2024)			
Liberia	Sam Forko	Monrovia, Liberia	MetroStars (2002)			
Liberia	Willis Forko	Monrovia, Liberia	Salt Lake (2006–07)			
Liberia	Chris Gbandi	Bong County, Liberia	Dallas (2003–07)			
Liberia	Sam Johnson	Monrovia, Liberia	Salt Lake (2019–20)			
Liberia	Zizi Roberts	Monrovia Liberia	Colorado (2003–04)			
Liberia	Musa Shannon	Syracuse, USA	Colorado (2002)	Tampa Bay (1997–99)		
Liberia	Adam Smarte	Monrovia, Liberia	San Jose (2008)			
Liberia	Melvin Tarley	Monrovia, Liberia	Colorado (2006)	Salt Lake (2005–06)		
Liberia	**Patrick Weah**	Monrovia, Liberia	**Atlanta** (2025–present)	Minnesota (2021–24)		
Mali	Kalifa Cissé	Dreux, France	New England (2013)			
Mali	**Baye Coulibaly**		**Charlotte** (2025–present)			
Mali	Youba Diarra	Bamako, Mali	New York Red Bulls (2021)			
Mali	Bakaye Dibassy	Paris, France	Minnesota (2020–23)			
Mali	**Abdoulaye Doucouré**	Meulan-en-Yvelines, France	**Charlotte** (2026–present)		Capped for France's national U17, U18, U19, U20 and U21 football teams	
Mali	**Mamadou Fofana**	Bamako, Mali	**New England** (2025–present)			
Mali	Daouda Kanté	Hamdallaye, Mali	New England (2002–04)			
Mali	Ibrahim Kante	Bamako, Mali	New England (2003)			
Mali	**Sékou Koné**		**New York Red Bulls** (2026–present)			
Mali	Rominigue Kouamé	Lopou, Ivory Coast	Chicago (2025)			
Mali	**Diadie Samassékou**	Bamako, Mali	**Houston** (2025–present)			
Mali	Bakary Soumaré	Bamako, Mali	Montreal (2015)	Chicago (2007–09), Philadelphia (2012–13)		
Mali	Djimi Traoré	Saint-Ouen, France	Seattle (2013–14)			
Nigeria	Ifunanyachi Achara	Enugu, Nigeria	Toronto (2020–22)			
Nigeria	Fanendo Adi	Lagos, Nigeria	Minnesota (2021)	Portland (2014–18), Cincinnati (2018–19), Columbus (2020)		
Nigeria	**Nonso Adimabua**		**San Jose** (2026–present)			
Nigeria	William Agada	Bauchi, Nigeria	Salt Lake (2025)	Kansas City (2022–25)		
Nigeria	Ade Akinbiyi	Hackney, UK	Houston (2009)			
Nigeria	**Ibrahim Aliyu**	Kano, Nigeria	**Houston** (2023–25, 2026–present)	Columbus (2025–26)		
Nigeria	Gbenga Arokoyo	Kabba, Nigeria	Portland (2016)			
Nigeria	Chidozie Awaziem	Enugu	Colorado (2025)	Cincinnati (2024)		
Nigeria	Bright Dike	Edmond, US	Toronto (2013–15)	Portland (2011–13)		
Nigeria	Connally Edozien	Lagos, Nigera	New England (2005)			
Nigeria	Emmanuel Ekpo	Ekori, Nigeria	Columbus (2008–11)			
Nigeria	Michael Emenalo	Aba, Nigeria	San Jose (1996–97)			
Nigeria	Sunusi Ibrahim	Keffi, Nigeria	Montreal (2021–25)			
Nigeria	James Igbekeme	Lagos, Nigeria	Columbus (2022)			
Nigeria	Kennedy Igboananike	Nri-Igbo, Nigeria	D.C. United (2016)	Chicago (2015–16)		
Nigeria	Nosa Igiebor	Abuja, Nigeria	Vancouver (2017)			
Nigeria	Benedict Iroha	Aba, Nigeria	D.C. United (1997)			
Nigeria	Emmanuel Iwe	Lagos, Nigeria	Minnesota (2023)			
Nigeria	**Daniel Job**	Nigeria	**Dallas** (2026–present)			
Nigeria	Obafemi Martins	Lagos, Nigeria	Seattle (2013–15)			
Nigeria	Manny Motajo	Greenbelt, US	New England (1998–99)	LA Galaxy (1996)		
Nigeria	**Obinna Nwobodo**	Enugu, Nigeria	**Cincinnati** (2022–present)			
Nigeria	Chinonso Offor	Jos, Nigeria	Montreal (2022–23)	Chicago (2021–22)		
Nigeria	**Hamzat Ojediran**	Lagos, Nigeria	**Colorado** (2026–present)			
Nigeria	Uche Okafor	Owerri, Nigeria	Kansas City (1996–00)			
Nigeria	Francis Okaroh	Enugu, Nigeria	Miami Fusion (2000)	New England (1996–97), Chicago (1998–99)		
Nigeria	Orji Okwonkwo	Benin City, Nigeria	Montreal (2019–20)			
Nigeria	Rasheed Olabiyi	Ibadan, Nigeria	Houston (2015)			
Nigeria	Patrick Olalere	Lagos, Nigeria	New England (1997)			
Nigeria	Victor Olatunji	Sokoto, Nigeria	Salt Lake (2025–26)			
Nigeria	Stephen Sunday	Lagos, Nigeria	Salt Lake (2016–18)		Capped for Spain's national U19, U20 and U21 football teams	
Nigeria	**Alhassan Yusuf**	Kano, Nigeria	**New England** (2024–present)			
Senegal	Dominique Badji	Dakar, Senegal	D.C. United (2024–25)	Colorado (2021), Dallas (2018–20), Nashville (2020–21), Cincinnati (2022–23)		
Senegal	Bouna Coundoul	Dakar, Senegal	New York Red Bulls (2009–11)	Colorado (2005–08)		
Senegal	Lamine Diack	Dakar, Senegal	Colorado (2024)			
Senegal	Mamadou Diallo	Dakar, Senegal	MetroStars (2002)	Tampa Bay (2000–01), New England (2002)		
Senegal	Zakaria Diallo	Équemauville, France	Montreal (2019)			
Senegal	**Mamadou Dieng**	Senegal	**Minnesota** (2025–present)			
Senegal	Birahim Diop	Thiès, Senegal	Kansas City (2010–12)	MetroStars (2001–2002)		
Senegal	Clément Diop	Paris, France	Atlanta (2023)	LA Galaxy (2016–17), Montreal (2018–21), Inter Miami (2022)	Capped for France's national U19 football team	
Senegal	Hamady Diop	Dakar, Senegal	San Diego (2025)	Charlotte (2023)		
Senegal	Moussa Djitté	Kaolack, Senegal	Austin (2021–22)			
Senegal	**Fallou Fall**	Rufisque, Senegal	**St. Louis** (2025–present)			
Senegal	Macoumba Kandji	Dakar, Senegal	Houston (2012)	New York Red Bulls (2008–10), Colorado (2010–11)		
Senegal	**Mamadou Mbacke**	Rufisque, Senegal	**St. Louis** (2026–present)	Los Angeles FC (2021–23)		
Senegal	Joseph Niouky	Pikine, Senegal	New England (2010)			
Senegal	**Cheikh Sabaly**	Kolda, Senegal	**Vancouver** (2026–present)			
Senegal	Lamine Sané	Villeneuve-sur-Lot, France	Orlando (2018–19)			
Senegal	Khaly Thiam	Dakar, Senegal	Chicago (2016)			
Senegal	**Jamal Thiaré**	Kaolack, Senegal	**Columbus** (2026–present)	Atlanta (2023–25)		
Senegal	Mohamed Traore	Dakar, Senegal	Los Angeles FC (2020)			
Sierra Leone	Abdul Thompson Conteh	Freetown, Sierra Leone	D.C. United (2001–02)	San Jose (2000)		
Sierra Leone	Isaiah Jones	Freetown, Sierra Leone	Nashville (2024)			
Sierra Leone	**Malachi Jones**	Freetown, Sierra Leone	**New York City FC** (2024, 2026–present)			
Sierra Leone	Alhaji Kamara	Freetown, Sierra Leone	D.C. United – 2016–17)			
Sierra Leone	Kei Kamara	Kenema, Sierra Leone	Cincinnati (2025)	Columbus (2006–07, 2015–16), San Jose (2008), Houston (2008–09), Kansas City (2009–13), New England (2016–17), Vancouver (2018), Colorado (2019–20), Minnesota (2020), Montréal (2022), Chicago (2023), Los Angeles FC (2024)		
Sierra Leone	Michael Lahoud	Freetown, Sierra Leone	Philadelphia (2012–16)	Chivas USA (2009–12)		
Sierra Leone	Augustine Williams	Freetown, Sierra Leone	LA Galaxy (2021)			
Togo	**Kévin Denkey**	Lomé, Togo	**Cincinnati** (2025–)			
Togo	Abbe Ibrahim	Lomé, Togo	Toronto (2007)	MetroStars (2005)		
Togo	Loïc Mesanvi	Lomé, Togo	Minnesota (2024–25)			

== Asia (AFC) ==
=== ASEAN ===
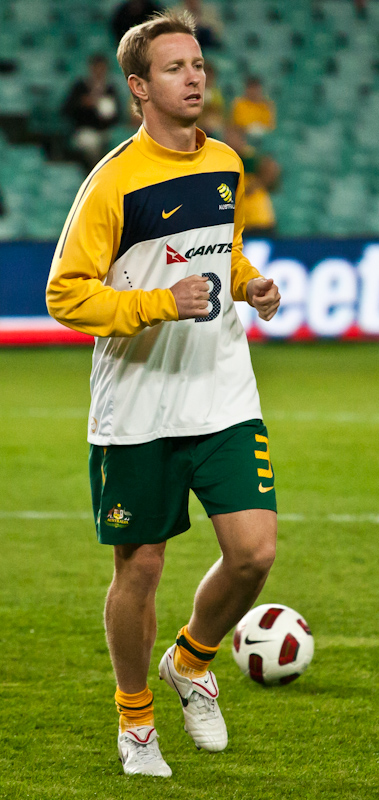
David Carney

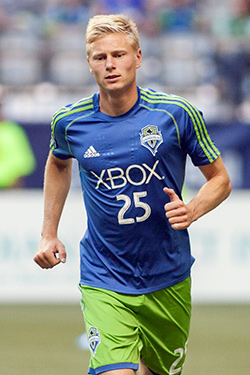
Andy Rose

Country	Name	Birthplace	Most recent MLS team	Former MLS team(s)	Notes	Refs
Australia	Danny Allsopp	Melbourne, Australia	D.C. United (2010)			
Australia	Zaydan Bello	Melbourne, Australia	Minnesota (2023)			
Australia	**Alex Bonetig**	Shellharbour, Australia	**Portland** (2026–present)			
Australia	Giuseppe Bovalina	Adelaide, Australia	Vancouver (2024–25)			
Australia	Lachlan Brook	Gawler, Australia	Salt Lake (2024–25)			
Australia	Tim Cahill	Sydney, Australia	New York Red Bulls (2012–14)		Capped for Samoa's national U17 and U20 football teams	
Australia	David Carney	Sydney, Australia	New York Red Bulls (2013)			
Australia	Miloš Degenek	Knin, Croatia	Columbus (2022–23)		Capped for Serbia's national U19 football team	
Australia	Alex Gersbach	Sutherland, Australia	Colorado (2023)			
Australia	Jake Girdwood-Reich	Clovelly, Australia	St. Louis (2024–25)			
Australia	**Archie Goodwin**	Newcastle, Australia	**Charlotte** (2025–present)			
Australia	Lucas Herrington	Brisbane, Australia	Colorado (2026)			
Australia	Bernie Ibini-Isei	Port Harcourt, Nigeria	Vancouver (2017–18)			
Australia	**Luka Jovanović**	Adelaide, Australia	**San Jose** (2026–present)			
Australia	**Aiden O'Neill**	Brisbane, Australia	**New York City FC** (2025–present)			
Australia	**Ariath Piol**	Adelaide, Australia	**Salt Lake** (2025–present)			
Australia	Andy Rose	Melbourne, Australia	Vancouver (2019–21)	Seattle (2012–15)		
Australia	**Kye Rowles**	Kiama, Australia	**D.C. United** (2025–present)			
Australia	Brad Smith	Penrith, Australia	Cincinnati (2025)	Seattle (2018–19, 2020–21), D.C. United (2022), Houston (2023–24)	Capped for England's national U17, U19 and U20 football teams	
Australia	**Kai Trewin**	Batemans Bay, Australia	**New York City FC** (2026–present)			
Australia	**Patrick Yazbek**	Liverpool, Australia	**Nashville** (2024–present)			
Indonesia	Maarten Paes	Nijmegen, Netherlands	Dallas (2022–25)		Capped for the Netherlands U19, U20 and U21 football teams	
Indonesia	**Adrian Wibowo**	Los Angeles, US	**Los Angeles FC** (2025–present)		Capped for the US men's national U17 soccer team	
Malaysia	Wan Kuzain	Carbondale, US	Kansas City (2018–20)			
Philippines	Zico Bailey	Henderson, US	Cincinnati (2020–22)		Capped for the US men's national U15 soccer team	
Philippines	Michael Baldisimo	Vancouver, Canada	San Jose (2023–24)	Vancouver (2020–22)	Capped for the Canadian national U17, U20, U21 and U23 soccer teams	
Philippines	Demitrius Omphroy	Alameda, US	Toronto (2011)		Capped for the US men's national U17 and Panama's men's national U21 soccer teams	
Philippines	Martin Steuble	Schlieren, Switzerland	Kansas City (2014)			
Philippines	Cole Mrowka	Chicago, US	Columbus (2024–present)			
Philippines	Anthony Markanich	Bourbonnais, US	Minnesota (2024–present)	Colorado (2022–23), St. Louis (2023–24)		
Philippines	**Nick Markanich**	Bourbonnais, US	**Houston** (2026–present)	Cincinnati (2022)		
Thailand	Anthony Ampaipitakwong	Carrollton, US	San Jose (2011)		Capped for the US men's national U17 soccer team	
Vietnam	Jason Pendant	Sarcelles, France	New York Red Bulls (2020–22)		Capped for France's national U16 and U18 football teams	

=== Central Asia ===
Country	Name	Birthplace	Most recent MLS team	Former MLS team(s)	Notes	Refs
Afghanistan	Adam Najem	Clifton, US	Philadelphia (2017)			
Iran	Khodadad Azizi	Fariman, Iran	San Jose (2000)			
Iran	Steven Beitashour	San Jose, US	Colorado (2020–23)	San Jose (2010–13), Vancouver (2014–15), Toronto (2016–17), Los Angeles FC (2018–19)		
Iran	Mohammad Khakpour	Tehran, Iran	MetroStars (1999–00)			
Iran	Arash Noamouz	Tehran, Iran	LA Galaxy (1996)			

=== East Asia ===
Country	Name	Birthplace	Most recent MLS team	Former MLS team(s)	Notes	Refs
China	Tan Long	Dalian, China	D.C. United (2012)	Vancouver (2011–12)		
China	**Ryan Raposo**	Hamilton, Canada	**Los Angeles FC** (2025–present)		Capped for the Canadian U23 soccer teams	
Guam	A. J. DeLaGarza	Bryans Road, US	New England (2021–22)	LA Galaxy (2009–16), Houston (2017–19), Inter Miami (2020)	Capped for the US national soccer team	
Guam	Ryan Guy	Carlsbad, US	New England (2011–13)			
Guam	Brandon McDonald	Glendale	Salt Lake (2013)	LA Galaxy (2008), San Jose (2009–11), D.C. United (2011–13)		
Guam	Erik Ustruck	St. Louis, US	Houston (2009)		Capped for the US men's national U20 soccer team	
Japan	Jun Marques Davidson	Tokyo, Japan	Vancouver (2012–13)			
Japan	Tsubasa Endoh	Tokyo, Japan	Toronto (2016–17, 2019–21)			
Japan	**Kyōgo Furuhashi**	Ikoma, Japan	**LA Galaxy** (2026–present)			
Japan	Yosuke Hanya	Tokyo, Japan	Colorado (2023)			
Japan	Akira Kaji	Minamiawaji, Japan	Chivas USA (2014)			
Japan	**Hosei Kijima**	Yokohama, Japan	**D.C. United** (2025–present)	St. Louis (2024)		
Japan	Kosuke Kimura	Kobe, Japan	New York Red Bulls (2013–14)	Colorado (2007–12), Portland (2012)		
Japan	Daigo Kobayashi	Fuji, Japan	New England (2014–17)	Vancouver (2013)		
Japan	Ken Krolicki	Tokyo, Japan	Montreal (2018–19)			
Japan	Yuya Kubo	Yamaguchi, Japan	Cincinnati (2020–25)			
Japan	Masato Kudo	Suginami, Japan	Vancouver (2016)			
Japan	**Keisuke Kurokawa**	Hyōgo, Japan	**D.C. United** (2026–present)			
Japan	**Kimito Nono**	Ibaraki, Japan	**D.C. United** (2026–present)			
Japan	**Yohei Takaoka**	Aoba-ku, Japan	**Vancouver** (2023–present)			
Japan	Terukazu Tanaka	Ibaraki, Japan	Salt Lake (2012)			
Japan	**Cayman Togashi**	New York City, US	**Atlanta** (2025–present)			
Japan	**Yutaro Tsukada**	Tokyo, Japan	**Orlando** (2024, 2026–present)			
Japan	Miki Yamane	Yokohama, Japan	LA Galaxy (2024–26)			
Japan	**Maya Yoshida**	Nagasaki, Japan	**LA Galaxy** (2023–present)			
Korea Republic (South Korea)	Hong Myung-bo	Seoul, South Korea	LA Galaxy (2003–04)			
Korea Republic (South Korea)	Hwang In-beom	Daejeon, South Korea	Vancouver (2019–20)			
Korea Republic (South Korea)	Jeong Ho-yeon	Mokpo, South Korea	Minnesota (2025)			
Korea Republic (South Korea)	**Jeong Sang-bin**	Cheonan, South Korea	**St. Louis** (2025–present)	Minnesota (2023–25)		
Korea Republic (South Korea)	Kim Jun-hong	Jeonju, South Korea	D.C. United (2025)			
Korea Republic (South Korea)	**Kim Kee-hee**	Busan, South Korea	**Seattle** (2018–19, 2025–present)			
Korea Republic (South Korea)	Kim Moon-hwan	Hwaseong, South Korea	Los Angeles FC (2021–22)			
Korea Republic (South Korea)	Lee Young-pyo	Hongcheon, South Korea	Vancouver (2012–13)			
Korea Republic (South Korea)	**Son Heung-min**	Chuncheon, South Korea	**Los Angeles FC** (2025–present)			
Korea Republic (South Korea)	**Kwon Hyeok-kyu**	Busan, South Korea	**Los Angeles FC** (2026–present)			
Northern Mariana Islands	Johann Noetzel	Seattle, US	Dallas (2000)			

=== South Asia ===
Country	Name	Birthplace	Most recent MLS team	Former MLS team(s)	Notes	Refs
Bangladesh	Shamit Shome	Edmonton, Canada	Montréal (2017–20)		Capped for the Canadian U18, U20, U21 and U23 and national soccer teams	

=== West Asia ===
Country	Name	Birthplace	Most recent MLS team	Former MLS team(s)	Notes	Refs
Iraq	Ali Adnan	Baghdad, Iraq	Vancouver (2019–20)			
Iraq	Mohanad Jeahze	Linköping, Sweden	D.C. United (2023–24)		Capped for Sweden's national U17 and U19 teams	
Iraq	Justin Meram	Shelby Charter Township, US	Charlotte (2023)	Columbus (2011–17), Orlando (2018), Atlanta (2019), Salt Lake (2020–23)		
Iraq	**Ahmed Qasem**	Motala, Sweden	**Nashville** (2025–present)		Capped for Sweden's national U17, U19 and U21	
Jordan	**Alec Smir**	Greensboro, US	**Minnesota** (2024–present)			
Lebanon	Soony Saad	Wyandotte, US	Kansas City (2011–14, 2017)		Capped for the US national U17 and U20 soccer teams	
Palestine	**Wessam Abou Ali**	Aalborg, Denmark	**Columbus** (2025–present)		Capped for the Danish national U17, U18, U19 and U20 football teams	
Palestine	Nazmi Albadawi	Raleigh, US	Cincinnati (2019)			
Palestine	Shaker Asad	Gaza, Palestine	New England (2000–02)			
Syria	Emiliano Amor	Buenos Aires, Argentina	Kansas City (2018)			
Syria	Molham Babouli	Al Ain, UAE	Toronto (2016)		Capped for Canada's national U23 soccer team	
Syria	**Belal Halbouni**	London, Canada	**Vancouver** (2024–present)			
Syria	Gabriel Somi	Örebro, Sweden	New England (2018)			

== Europe (UEFA) ==
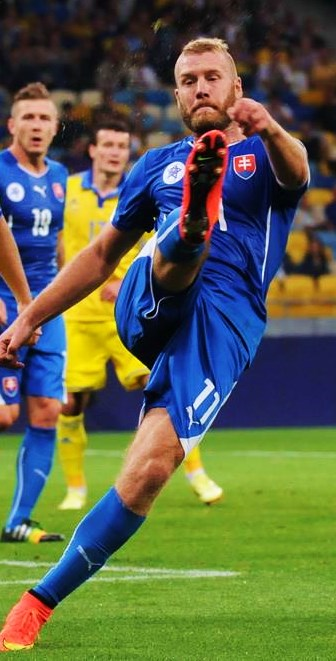
Adam Nemec

=== Eastern Europe ===
Country	Name	Birthplace	Most recent MLS team	Former MLS team(s)	Notes	Refs
Belarus	Sasha Gotsmanov	Minsk, Soviet Union	Colorado (2005)			
Bulgaria	Kalin Bankov	Sofia, Bulgaria	Tampa Bay (2000–01)			
Bulgaria	Stefan Dimitrov	Veliko Tarnovo, Bulgaria	Chicago (2009–10)			
Bulgaria	Galin Ivanov	Dobrich, Bulgaria	D.C. United (2003)			
Bulgaria	Stanislav Ivanov	Gabrovo, Belgium	Chicago (2021–22)			
Bulgaria	Filip Krastev	Sofia, Bulgaria	Los Angeles FC (2023)			
Bulgaria	Anton Nedyalkov	Lovech, Bulgaria	Dallas (2018)			
Bulgaria	Hristo Stoichkov	Plovdiv, Bulgaria	Chicago, D.C. United – 2000–03)			
Bulgaria	Dominik Yankov	Toronto, Canada	Montréal (2024–25)			
Czech Republic	**Pavel Bucha**	Nelahozeves, Czech Republic	**Cincinnati** (2024–present)			
Czech Republic	Bořek Dočkal	Městec Králové, Czech Republic	Philadelphia (2018)			
Czech Republic	**David Douděra**	Brandýs nad Labem-Stará Boleslav, Czech Republic	**Cincinnati** (2026–present)			
Czech Republic	Jani Galik	Czech Republic	New England (2006)			
Czech Republic	Luboš Kubík	Vysoké Mýto, Czech Republic	Dallas (2001)	Chicago (1998–00)		
Czech Republic	Ondřej Lingr	Havířov, Czech Republic	Houston (2025–26)			
Czech Republic	Zdeněk Ondrášek	Strakonice, Czechoslovakia	Dallas (2019–20)			
Czech Republic	**Tomáš Ostrák**	Frýdek-Místek, Czech Republic	**St. Louis** (2023–)			
Hungary	Botond Baráth	Budapest, Hungary	Kansas City (2019)			
Hungary	**Dániel Gazdag**	Nyíregyháza, Hungary	**New England** (2026–present)	Philadelphia, (2021–25), Columbus (2025–26)		
Hungary	Zoltán Hercegfalvi	Budapest, Hungary	Kansas City (2009)			
Hungary	Krisztián Németh	Győr, Hungary	Columbus (2020)	Kansas City (2015), New England (2017–18)		
Hungary	Nemanja Nikolić	Senta, Yugoslavia	Chicago (2017–19)			
Hungary	**Dániel Sallói**	Siófok, Hungary	**Toronto** (2026–present)	Kansas City (2017–25)		
Hungary	Szabolcs Schön	Budapest, Hungary	Dallas (2021)			
Hungary	Zoltán Stieber	Sárvár, Hungary	D.C. United (2017–19)			
Hungary	István Urbányi	Salgótarján, Hungary	San Jose (1997–98)			
Moldova	**Mihail Gherasimencov**	Bălți, Moldova	**Vancouver** (2026–)			
Poland	**Wiktor Bogacz**	Starachowice, Poland	**New York Red Bulls** (2025–)			
Poland	**Mateusz Bogusz**	Ruda Śląska, Poland	**Houston** (2026–)	Los Angeles FC (2023–24)		
Poland	**Dawid Bugaj**	Sosnowiec, Poland	**Montréal** (2024–)			
Poland	Adam Buksa	Kraków, Poland	New England (2020–22)			
Poland	Przemysław Frankowski	Gdańsk, Poland	Chicago (2019–21)			
Poland	Tomasz Frankowski	Białystok, Poland	Chicago (2008)			
Poland	Kamil Jóźwiak	Międzyrzecz, Poland	Charlotte (2022–23)			
Poland	Andrzej Juskowiak	Gostyń, Poland	MetroStars (2003)			
Poland	Mateusz Klich	Tarnów, Poland	Atlanta (2025)	D.C. United (2023–24)		
Poland	Patryk Klimala	Świdnica, Poland	New York Red Bulls (2021–22)			
Poland	Roman Kosecki	Piaseczno, Poland	Chicago (1998–99)			
Poland	Sebastian Kowalczyk	Szczecin, Poland	Houston (2023–25)			
Poland	Wojtek Krakowiak	Kielce, Poland	Tampa Bay (2001)	San Jose (2000–01)		
Poland	Krzysztof Król	Wodzisław Śląski, Poland	Montreal (2014)	Chicago (2010)		
Poland	**Robert Lewandowski**	Warsaw, Poland	**Chicago** (2026–present)			
Poland	**Dominik Marczuk**	Międzyrzec Podlaski, Poland	**Salt Lake** (2024–present)	Cincinnati (2025)		
Poland	Jarosław Niezgoda	Poniatowa, Poland	Portland (2020–23)			
Poland	Piotr Nowak	Pabianice, Poland	Chicago (1998–2002)			
Poland	Damien Perquis	Troyes, France	Toronto (2015–16)		Capped for France's national U21 football team	
Poland	**Przemysław Płacheta**	Łowicz, Poland	**Austin** (2026–present)			
Poland	Jerzy Podbrożny	Przemyśl, Poland	Chicago (1998–99)			
Poland	Kacper Przybyłko	Bielefeld, Germany	Chicago (2022–23)	Philadelphia (2019–21)		
Poland	Miroslaw Rzepa	Bydgoszcz, Poland	Columbus (2000)			
Poland	Bartosz Slisz	Rybnik, Poland	Atlanta (2024–25)			
Poland	Jan Sobociński	Łódź, Poland	Charlotte (2022–23)			
Poland	Karol Świderski	Rawicz, Poland	Charlotte (2022–24)			
Poland	Przemysław Tytoń	Zamość, Poland	Cincinnati (2019–21)			
Poland	Konrad Warzycha	Zabrze, Poland	Columbus (2013)	Kansas City (2012–13)		
Poland	Robert Warzycha	Siemkowice, Poland	Columbus (1996–2002)			
Poland	Jacek Ziober	Łódź, Poland	Tampa Bay (1998)			
Romania	Alexandru Băluță	Craiova, Romania	Los Angeles FC (2025)			
Romania	Deian Boldor	Timișoara, Romania	Montreal (2017)			
Romania	**Ștefan Chirilă**	Allentown, US	**FC Cincinnati** (2025–present)		Capped for US national U18	
Romania	Andreas Ivan	Pitești, Romania	New York Red Bulls (2018–19)		Capped for Germany's national U19 football team	
Romania	Răzvan Cociș	Cluj-Napoca, Romania	Chicago (2014–16)			
Romania	**Alexandru Mățan**	Galați, Romania	**St. Louis** (2026–present)	Columbus (2021–24)		
Romania	Alexandru Mitriță	Craiova, Romania	New York City FC (2019–20)			
Romania	**Louis Munteanu**	Vaslui, Romania	**D.C. United** (2026–present)			
Romania	Alex Zotincă	Sibiu, Romania	Chivas USA (2007–08, 2010)	Kansas City (2003–06)		
Russia	Rod Dyachenko	Georgiyevsk, Soviet Union	D.C. United (2006–08)			
Russia	**Aleksei Miranchuk**	Slavyansk-on-Kuban, Russia	**Atlanta** (2024–present)			
Russia	Sergei Raad	Leningrad, Soviet Union	Kansas City (2006)			
Russia	Igor Simutenkov	Moscow, Soviet Union	Kansas City (2002–04)			
Russia	**Magomed-Shapi Suleymanov**	Makhachkala, Russia	**Kansas City** (2025–present)			
Russia	Maxim Usanov	Leningrad, Soviet Union	Toronto (2010)			
Slovakia	**Samuel Gidi**	Accra, Ghana	**Cincinnati** (2025–present)			
Slovakia	Ján Greguš	Nitra, Slovakia	Houston (2024)	Minnesota (2019–21), San Jose (2022), Nashville (2023)		
Slovakia	Adam Nemec	Banská Bystrica, Czechoslovakia	New York City FC (2015)			
Slovakia	Henrich Ravas	Senica, Slovakia	New England (2024)			
Slovakia	Ľubomír Reiter	Stropkov, Czechoslovakia	Chicago (2005)			
Slovakia	**Albert Rusnák**	Vyškov, Czech Republic	**Seattle** (2022–present)	Salt Lake (2017–21)		
Slovakia	Boris Sekulić	Zemun, Yugoslavia	Chicago (2020–22)			
Ukraine	**Yevhen Cheberko**	Melitopol, Ukraine	**Los Angeles FC** (2026–present)	Columbus (2023–26)		
Ukraine	Sergi Daniv	Kalush, Soviet Union	Chicago (2001–02)	Dallas (1999–00)		
Ukraine	Ihor Dotsenko	Kiev, Soviet Union	Kansas City (2000)			
Ukraine	Aleksey Korol	Kiev, Soviet Union	Chicago (2002)	Dallas (2000–01)		
Ukraine	Dema Kovalenko	Kiev, Soviet Union	LA Galaxy (2009–10)	Chicago (1999–02), D.C. United (2003–05), New York Red Bulls (2006–08), Salt Lake (2008)		
Ukraine	Serhiy Kryvtsov	Zaporizhzhia, Soviet Union	Inter Miami (2023–24)			
Ukraine	Yuri Lavrinenko	Kiev, Soviet Union	Chicago (2000)			
Ukraine	Artem Smolyakov	Baranivka, Ukraine	Los Angeles FC (2025–26)			
Ukraine	**Oleksandr Svatok**	Kamianske, Ukraine	**Austin** (2024–present)			
Ukraine	**Hennadiy Synchuk**	Manchenky, Ukraine	**Montréal** (2025–present)			

=== Northern Europe ===
Country	Name	Birthplace	Most recent MLS team	Former MLS team(s)	Notes	Refs
Denmark	**Malte Amundsen**	Næstved, Denmark	**Columbus** (2023–present)	New York City FC (2021–23)		
Denmark	**Mikkel Desler**	Assens, Denmark	**Austin** (2024–present)			
Denmark	**Anders Dreyer**	Bramming, Denmark	**San Diego** (2025–present)			
Denmark	Nikolas Dyhr	Horsens, Denmark	St. Louis (2024)			
Denmark	Ronnie Ekelund	Glostrup, Denmark	San Jose (2001–04)			
Denmark	**Lukas Engel**	Kastrup, Denmark	**Salt Lake** (2026–)	Cincinnati (2025)		
Denmark	**Nicolas Defreitas-Hansen**	Southwest Ranches, US	**Colorado** (2025–present)		Capped for US national U17 soccer team	
Denmark	Niko Hansen	Randers, Denmark	Minnesota (2021–22)	Columbus (2017–19), Houston (2019–20)		
Denmark	**Carlo Holse**	Copenhagen, Denmark	**St. Louis** (2026–present)			
Denmark	**Marcus Ingvartsen**	Farum, Denmark	**San Diego** (2025–present)			
Denmark	David Jensen	Hillerød, Denmark	New York Red Bulls (2020)			
Denmark	Isak Jensen	Denmark	St. Louis (2023)			
Denmark	Mathias Jørgensen	Hundested, Denmark	New York Red Bulls (2019–20)			
Denmark	Mathias Jørgensen	Copenhagen, Denmark	LA Galaxy (2025)			
Denmark	Bashkim Kadrii	Copenhagen, Denmark	Minnesota (2017)			
Denmark	Emil Larsen	Copenhagen, Denmark	Columbus (2016)			
Denmark	Rajko Lekić	Copenhagen, Denmark	New England (2011)			
Denmark	Philip Lund	Vejle, Denmark	Seattle (2013)			
Denmark	Andreas Maxsø	Hvidovre, Denmark	Colorado (2023–25)			
Denmark	Miklos Molnar	Copenhagen, Denmark	Kansas City (2000)			
Denmark	Younes Namli	Copenhagen, Denmark	Colorado (2020–21)			
Denmark	Brian Nielsen	Herlev, Denmark	New York Red Bulls (2010–11)			
Denmark	Jimmy Nielsen	Aalborg, Denmark	Kansas City (2010–13)			
Denmark	David Ousted	Roskilde, Denmark	Chicago (2019)	Vancouver (2013–17), D.C. United (2018)		
Denmark	Tobias Salquist	Ikast, Denmark	Chicago (2024)			
Denmark	**Japhet Sery Larsen**	Copenhagen, Denmark	**Philadelphia** (2026–present)			
Denmark	Christian Sivebæk	Vejle, Denmark	Seattle (2012)			
Denmark	**Osvald Søe**	Copenhagen, Denmark	**San Diego** (2026–)			
Denmark	Erik Sviatchenko	Viborg, Denmark	Houston (2023–26)			
Denmark	**Jeppe Tverskov**	Copenhagen, Denmark	**San Diego** (2025–present)			
Denmark	Mikael Uhre	Ribe, Denmark	Philadelphia (2022–25)			
Denmark	**Philip Zinckernagel**	Copenhagen, Denmark	**Chicago** (2025–present)			
England	Mo Adams	Nottingham, England	Inter Miami (2021–22)	Chicago (2018–19), Atlanta (2019–21)		
England	Korede Aiyegbusi	Hackney, England	Kansas City (2010–12)			
England	Brandon Austin	Hemel Hempstead, England	Orlando (2021)		Capped for the US men's national's U18 soccer team	
England	Jack Barmby	Harlow, England	Portland (2016–18)			
England	David Beckham	Leytonstone, England	LA Galaxy (2007–12)			
England	Ian Bishop	Liverpool, England	Miami Fusion (2001)			
England	Tyler Blackett	Manchester, England	Cincinnati (2021–22)			
England	Luke Boden	Sheffield, England	Orlando (2015–16)			
England	**Jonathan Bond**	Hemel Hempstead, England	**Houston** (2025–present)	LA Galaxy (2021–23)	Capped for the Wales national U17 and U19 football teams	
England	John Bostock	Camberwell, England	Toronto (2013)			
England	Chris Brown	London, England	Dallas (1998)			
England	**Noel Buck**	Arlington, US	New England, **San Jose** – 2022–present)			
England	Ian Butterworth	Crewe, England	Colorado (1996)			
England	**Nathan Byrne**	St Albans, England	**Charlotte** (2022–present)			
England	Tony Caig	Cleator Moor, England	Houston (2008)			
England	Kasali Yinka Casal	London, England	D.C. United (2007)			
England	Ashley Cole	Stepney, England	LA Galaxy (2016–18)			
England	Terry Cooke	Marston Green, England	Colorado (2005–09)			
England	Matt Crooks	Leeds, England	Salt Lake (2024)			
England	John Cunliffe	Bolton, England	San Jose (2008)	Chivas USA (2007)		
England	Jermain Defoe	Beckton, England	Toronto (2014)			
England	Danny Dichio	Notting Hill, England	Toronto (2007–09)			
England	Paul Dougherty	Leamington Spa, England	Colorado (2000)	New York Red Bulls (1998), Tampa Bay (1998–99), Chicago (1999)		
England	**Andre Dozzell**	Ipswich, England	**D.C. United** (2026–present)			
England	Andrew Driver	Saddleworth, England	Houston (2013–14)		Capped for Scotland's national U16 football team	
England	Richard Eckersley	Salford, England	New York Red Bulls (2014)	Toronto (2011–13)		
England	Tom Edwards	Stafford, England	New York Red Bulls (2021–22)			
England	Mandela Egbo	Brent, England	New York Red Bulls (2020–21)			
England	**Jack Elliott**	London, England	**Chicago** (2025–present)	Philadelphia (2017–24)		
England	Hogan Ephraim	Archway, England	Toronto (2013)			
England	Shay Facey	Sale, England	New York City FC (2015)			
England	Ashley Fletcher	Keighley, England	New York Red Bulls (2022)			
England	Steven Gerrard	Whiston, England	LA Galaxy (2015–16)			
England	Kieran Gibbs	Lambeth, England	Inter Miami (2021-22)			
England	Jason Griffiths	Bracknell, England	New England (2010)			
England	Steve Guppy	Winchester, England	D.C. United (2005)			
England	Jack Gurr	Newcastle upon Tyne, England	Atlanta (2021)			
England	**Calvin Harris**	Middlesbrough, England	**Kansas City** (2026–present)	Cincinnati (2021–22), Colorado (2023–25)		
England	**Jack Harrison**	Stoke-on-Trent, England	**New England** (2026–present)	New York City FC (2016–17)		
England	Aidan Heaney	Newcastle upon Tyne, England	New England (1996)			
England	Harrison Heath	Newcastle-under-Lyme, England	Minnesota (2018)	Orlando (2014–16), Atlanta (2017)		
England	Seb Hines	Wetherby, England	Orlando (2015–17)			
England	**Rob Holding**	Stalybridge, England	**Colorado** (2025–present)			
England	Joe Holland	Birmingham, England	Houston (2017)			
England	Steve Howey	Sunderland, England	New England (2004)			
England	Darren Huckerby	Nottingham, England	San Jose (2008–09)			
England	Andy Iro	Liverpool, England	Toronto (2011)	Columbus (2008–11)		
England	Danny Jackson	Leeds, England	Colorado (2002)			
England	Eddie Johnson	Chester, England	Portland (2011)			
England	Matt Jones	Stoke-on-Trent, England	Philadelphia (2016)			
England	Ryan Kent	Oldham, England	Seattle (2025)			
England	Zat Knight	Solihull, England	Colorado (2014)			
England	Frank Lampard	Romford, England	New York City FC (2015–16)			
England	**Matty Longstaff**	Rotherham, England	**Montréal** (2025–present)	Toronto (2024–25)		
England	Christian McFarlane	Brentwood, England	New York City FC (2024)		Capped for the US men's national U17 soccer team	
England	Tyrone Mears	Stockport, England	Minnesota (2017–18)	Seattle (2014–16), Atlanta (2017)		
England	**Alex Mighten**	West Hartford, US	**San Diego** (2025–present)			
England	**Zane Monlouis**	Lewisham, England	**Toronto** (2025–present)			
England	Luke Moore	Birmingham, England	Toronto (2014–15)	Chivas USA (2014)		
England	Taylor Morgan	Southampton, England	Toronto (2013)			
England	Luke Mulholland	Preston, England	Salt Lake (2014–19)			
England	Jordon Mutch	Alvaston, England	Vancouver (2018)			
England	Lewis Neal	Leicester, England	Orlando (2015)	D.C. United (2012–14)		
England	Lewis O'Brien	Colchester, England	Los Angeles FC (2024)	D.C. United (2023)		
England	Toyosi Olusanya	Lambeth, England	Houston (2025)			
England	Nedum Onuoha	Warri, Nigeria	Salt Lake (2018–20)			
England	Bradley Orr	Liverpool, England	Toronto (2014)			
England	Jamie Paterson	Coventry, England	Charlotte (2024)			
England	Kyle Patterson	Birmingham, England	LA Galaxy (2009)			
England	Tom Pearce	Ormskirk, England	Montréal (2024–25)			
England	Jack Price	Shewsbury, England	Colorado (2018–23)			
England	Nigel Reo-Coker	Southwark, England	Montreal (2015–16)	Vancouver (2013–14), Chivas USA (2014)		
England	Rohan Ricketts	Clapham, England	Toronto (2008–09)			
England	Paul Rideout	Bournemouth, England	Kansas City (1998)			
England	Liam Ridgewell	Bexleyheath, England	Portland (2014–18)			
England	Luke Rodgers	Birmingham, England	New York Red Bulls (2011)			
England	John Rooney	Liverpool, England	New York Red Bulls (2011)			
England	Wayne Rooney	Liverpool, England	D.C. United (2018–19)			
England	Darel Russell	Mile End, England	Toronto (2013)			
England	Billy Sharp	Sheffield, England	LA Galaxy (2023)			
England	Richard Sharpe	Berkshire, England	Colorado (1996)			
England	Samuel Shashoua	London, England	Minnesota (2024–25)			
England	Ryan Shawcross	Chester, England	Inter Miami (2021)			
England	Jay Simpson	Enfield, England	Philadelphia (2017–18)			
England	Josh Sims	Yeovil, England	New York Red Bulls (2019)			
England	**Tyger Smalls**	London, England	**Charlotte** (2024–present)			
England	Kimarni Smith	Nottingham, England	D.C. United (2021–22)			
England	Ryan Smith	Islington, England	Chivas USA (2012)	Kansas City (2010–11)		
England	Jordan Stewart	Birmingham, England	San Jose (2013–16)			
England	Dan Stratford	London, England	D.C. United (2008)			
England	**Sam Surridge**	Slough, England	**Nashville** (2023–present)			
England	**Harry Toffolo**	Welwyn Garden City, England	**Charlotte** (2025–present)			
England	Rob Vincent	Liverpool, England	D.C. United (2016–17)			
England	Anton Walkes	Lewisham, England	Charlotte (2020–22)	Atlanta (2017)		
England	Charlie Ward	Birmingham, England	Houston (2017–18)			
England	Grant Ward	Lewisham, England	Chicago – 2014)			
England	Matt Watson	Bromsgrove, England	Chicago (2014–15)	Vancouver (2012–13)		
England	Andy Welsh	Manchester, England	Toronto (2007)			
England	**Ashley Westwood**	Nantwich, England	**Charlotte** (2023–present)			
England	**Morgan Whittaker**	Derby, England	**Colorado** (2026–present)			
England	Mark Wilson	Scunthorpe, England	Dallas (2005–06)			
England	Ian Woan	Heswall, England	Columbus, Miami Fusion (2001)			
England	Chris Woods	Swineshead, England	Colorado (1996)			
England	Bradley Wright-Phillips	Lewisham, England	Columbus (2021)	New York Red Bulls (2013–19), Los Angeles FC (2020)		
England	Shaun Wright-Phillips	Greenwich, England	New York Red Bulls (2015–16)			
England	Laurence Wyke	Bolton, England	Atlanta (2020)			
England	Dru Yearwood	Harlow, England	New York Red Bulls, Nashville (2020–24)			
Estonia	Joel Lindpere	Tallinn, Soviet Union	Chicago (2013)	New York Red Bulls (2010–12)		
Estonia	Erik Sorga	Tallinn, Estonia	D.C. United (2020–21)			
Finland	Markus Halsti	Helsinki, Finaldn	D.C. United (2015)			
Finland	Niko Hämäläinen	West Palm Beach, US	LA Galaxy (2021)	Los Angeles FC (2019)		
Finland	Lassi Lappalainen	Espoo, Finland	Columbus (2025)	Montréal (2019–24)		
Finland	**Robin Lod**	Helsinki, Finland	**Chicago** (2026–present)	Minnesota (2019–25)		
Finland	**Matti Peltola**	Espoo, Finland	**D.C. United** (2024–present)			
Finland	Teemu Pukki	Kotka, Finland	Minnesota (2023–24)			
Finland	Jukka Raitala	Kerava, Finland	Minnesota (2021)	Columbus (2017), Montreal (2018–20)		
Finland	Alexander Ring	Helsinki, Finland	Austin (2021–24)	New York City FC (2017–20)		
Finland	Rasmus Schüller	Espoo, Finland	Minnesota (2017–19)			
Finland	Toni Ståhl	Tuusula, Finland	Philadelphia (2010)			
Finland	Antti Sumiala	Pori, Finland	Kansas City (2005)			
Finland	Teemu Tainio	Tornio, Finland	New York Red Bulls (2011–12)			
Finland	**Robert Taylor**	Kuopio, Finland	**LA Galaxy** (2026–present)	Inter Miami (2022–25), Austin (2025–26)		
Finland	Jere Uronen	Turku, Finland	Charlotte (2023–24)			
Finland	Leo Väisänen	Helsinki, Finland	Austin (2023–24)			
Finland	**Onni Valakari**	Motherwell, Scotland	**San Diego** (2025–present)			
Finland	Simo Valakari	Helsinki, Finland	Dallas (2004–06)			
Finland	Mika Väyrynen	Eskilstuna, Sweden	LA Galaxy (2015)			
Finland	**Leo Walta**	Vantaa, Finland	**Los Angeles FC** (2026–present)			
Iceland	Victor Pálsson	Reykjavik, Iceland	D.C. United (2022–23)	New York Red Bulls (2012)		
Iceland	Kristinn Steindórsson	Reykjavik, Iceland	Columbus (2015)			
Iceland	Guðmundur Þórarinsson	Selfoss, Iceland	New York City FC (2020–21)			
Iceland	Nökkvi Þeyr Þórisson	Dalvík, Iceland	St. Louis (2023–24)			
Iceland	**Dagur Dan Þórhallsson**	Hafnarfjörður, Iceland	**San Diego** (2026–present)	Orlando (2023–25), Montréal (2026)		
Iceland	Róbert Orri Þorkelsson	Reykjavik, Iceland	Montréal (2022–23)			
Iceland	Arnór Ingvi Traustason	Keflavík, Iceland	New England (2021–22)			
Iceland	Thorleifur Úlfarsson	Reykjavik, Iceland	Houston (2022–23)			
Latvia	Raivis Hščanovičs	Riga, Soviet Union	Toronto (2010)			
Lithuania	Vytautas Andriuškevičius	Alytus, Lithuania	D.C. United (2018)	Portland (2016–18)		
Lithuania	Edgaras Jankauskas	Vilnius, Lithuania	New England (2009–10)			
Northern Ireland	Paddy McNair	Ballyclare, Northern Ireland	San Diego (2025)			
Northern Ireland	Steve Morrow	Belfast, Northern Ireland	Dallas (2002–03)			
Northern Ireland	Martin Paterson	Tunstall, England	Orlando (2015)			
Northern Ireland	Jonny Steele	Larne, Northern Ireland	New York Red Bulls (2013–14)	Salt Lake (2012)		
Northern Ireland	Mark Williams	Stalybridge, England	Columbus (2003)			
Norway	Øyvind Alseth	Trondheim, Norway	Toronto (2017)			
Norway	Jo Inge Berget	Hadeland, Norway	New York City FC (2018)			
Norway	**Lasse Berg Johnsen**	Stavanger, Norway	**Kansas City** (2026–present)			
Norway	Ola Brynhildsen	Bærum, Norway	Toronto (2025)			
Norway	Vadim Demidov	Riga, Soviet Union	Minnesota (2017)			
Norway	Adama Diomande	Oslo, Norway	Toronto (2023)	Los Angeles FC (2018–20)		
Norway	Magnus Wolff Eikrem	Molde, Norway	Seattle (2018)			
Norway	Ruben Gabrielsen	Oslo, Norway	Austin (2022)			
Norway	Dennis Gjengaar	Horten, Norway	New York Red Bulls (2024–25)			
Norway	**Jakob Glesnes**	Sotra, Norway	**LA Galaxy** (2026–present)	Philadelphia (2020–25)		
Norway	Stian Rode Gregersen	Kristiansund, Norway	Atlanta (2024–26)			
Norway	Fredrik Gulbrandsen	Lillestrøm, Norway	New York Red Bulls (2017)			
Norway	**Andreas Hanche-Olsen**	Bodø, Norway	**Chicago** (2026–present)			
Norway	Odin Thiago Holm	Trondheim, Norway	Los Angeles FC (2025)			
Norway	Eirik Johansen	Tønsberg, Norway	New York City FC (2015–17)			
Norway	Bjørn Maars Johnsen	New York City, US	Montreal (2021)			
Norway	Pa-Modou Kah	Banjul, Gambia	Vancouver (2015–16)	Portland (2013–14)		
Norway	Ola Kamara	Oslo, Norway	D.C. United (2019–22)	Columbus (2016–17), LA Galaxy (2018)		
Norway	Muhamed Keita	Banjul, Gambia	New York Red Bulls (2017–18)			
Norway	Nicolai Næss	Oslo, Norway	Columbus (2016–17)			
Norway	**Amahl Pellegrino**	Drammen, Norway	**San Diego** (2025–present)	San Jose (2024–25)		
Norway	Birk Risa	Stavanger, Norway	New York City FC (2023–25)			
Norway	Sigurd Rosted	Oslo, Norway	Toronto (2023–25)			
Norway	Jørgen Skjelvik	Hosle, Norway	LA Galaxy (2018–19)			
Norway	Jan Gunnar Solli	Arendal, Norway	New York Red Bulls (2011–12)			
Norway	**Edvard Tagseth**	Frosta, Norway	**Nashville** (2025–present)			
Norway	**Tomas Totland**	Bergen, Norway	**St. Louis** (2024–present)			
Norway	Bjørn Inge Utvik	Avaldsnes, Norway	Vancouver (2024–25)			
Norway	**Kristoffer Velde**	Haugesund, Norway	**Portland** (2025–present)			
Norway	**Conrad Wallem**	Tønsberg, Norway	**St. Louis** (2025–present)			
Republic of Ireland	Richie Baker	Dublin, Ireland	New England (2004)			
Republic of Ireland	Bryan Byrne	Kilkenny, Ireland	New England (2007)			
Republic of Ireland	Kevin Doyle	Adamstown, Ireland	Colorado (2015–17)			
Republic of Ireland	Danny Earls	Wicklow, Ireland	Colorado (2010–11)			
Republic of Ireland	Caleb Folan	Leeds, England	Colorado (2011)			
Republic of Ireland	**Jon Gallagher**	Dundalk, Ireland	**Austin** (2021–present)	Atlanta (2018–20)		
Republic of Ireland	Ian Hennessy	Cork, Ireland	MetroStars (1996)			
Republic of Ireland	Robbie Keane	Dublin, Ireland	LA Galaxy (2011–16)			
Republic of Ireland	Paul Keegan	Dublin, Ireland	New England (1996–00)			
Republic of Ireland	Kevin Long	Cork, Ireland	Toronto (2024–25)			
Republic of Ireland	Joe Mason	Plymouth, England	Colorado (2018)			
Republic of Ireland	Chris McCann	Dublin, Ireland	D.C. United (2019)	Atlanta (2016–19)		
Republic of Ireland	Quinn McNeill	Cork, Ireland	Charlotte (2022)			
Republic of Ireland	Andrew Moran	Dublin, Ireland	Los Angeles FC (2025)			
Republic of Ireland	Jake Mulraney	Dublin, Ireland	Orlando (2022)	Atlanta (2020–22)		
Republic of Ireland	Harvey Neville	Manchester, England	Inter Miami (2022–23)			
Republic of Ireland	Andy O'Brien	Harrogate, England	Vancouver (2012–14)		Capped for England's national U18 football team	
Republic of Ireland	Ronnie O'Brien	Bray, Ireland	San Jose (2008)	Dallas (2002–06), Toronto (2007)		
Republic of Ireland	Darren O'Dea	Dublin, Ireland	Toronto (2012–13)			
Republic of Ireland	**Kevin O'Toole**	Montclair, US	**New York City FC** (2022–)			
Republic of Ireland	Connor Ronan	Rochdale, England	Colorado (2023–26)		Capped for England's national U17 football team	
Republic of Ireland	Sean St Ledger	Solihull, England	Colorado (2015)	Orlando (2015)		
Republic of Ireland	Derrick Williams	Hamburg, Germany	Atlanta (2024–25)	LA Galaxy (2021–22), D.C. United (2022–23)		
Scotland	Stuart Armstrong	Inverness, Scotland	Vancouver (2024)			
Scotland	Luis Binks	Gillingham, England	Montreal (2020)		Capped for England's national U16, U17, U18 and U19 football teams	
Scotland	Kris Boyd	Irvine, Scotland	Portland (2012)			
Scotland	Chris Cadden	Bellshill, Scotland	Columbus (2020)			
Scotland	Steven Caldwell	Stirling, Scotland	Toronto (2013–15)			
Scotland	Peter Canero	Glasgow, Scotland	New York Red Bulls (2006)			
Scotland	Jamie Clark	Aberdeen, Scotland	San Jose (1999–00)			
Scotland	Paul Dalglish	Glasgow, Scotland	Houston (2006–07)			
Scotland	Kenny Deuchar	Stirling, Scotland	Salt Lake (2008)			
Scotland	Stuart Findlay	Glasgow, Scotland	Philadelphia (2021–22)			
Scotland	Tony Gallacher	Glasgow, Scotland	Toronto (2020)			
Scotland	**Ryan Gauld**	Aberdeen, Scotland	**Vancouver** (2021–present)			
Scotland	Richard Gough	Stockholm, Sweden	San Jose (1998)	Kansas City (1997)		
Scotland	**Angus Gunn**	Norwich, England	**San Jose** (2026–present)		Capped for England's national U16, U17, U19, U20 and U21 football teams	
Scotland	Mo Johnston	Glasgow, Scotland	Kansas City (1996–2001)			
Scotland	Gary Mackay-Steven	Thurso, Scotland	New York City FC (2019–20)			
Scotland	Calum Mallace	Torphichen, Scotland	Montreal, Los Angeles FC (2012–18)			
Scotland	Shaun Maloney	Miri, Malaysia	Chicago (2015)			
Scotland	Tam McManus	Balornock, Scotland	Colorado (2008)			
Scotland	Kenny Miller	Edinburgh, Scotland	Vancouver (2012–14)			
Scotland	Adam Moffat	Glasgow, Scotland	Dallas (2014)	Columbus (2007–10), Portland (2011), Houston (2011–13), Seattle (2013)		
Scotland	**Lewis Morgan**	Greenock, Scotland	**Toronto** (2026–present)	Inter Miami (2020–21), New York Red Bulls (2021–25), San Diego (2026)		
Scotland	Sam Nicholson	Edinburgh, Scotland	Colorado (2022–23)	Minnesota (2017–20)		
Scotland	**Ryan Porteous**	Dalkeith, Scotland	**Los Angeles FC** (2025–present)			
Scotland	Barry Robson	Inverurie, Scotland	Vancouver (2012)			
Scotland	Johnny Russell	Glasgow, Scotland	Salt Lake (2025)	Kansas City (2018–24)		
Scotland	Jamie Smith	Alexandria, Scotland	Colorado (2009–13)			
Scotland	Steven Smith	Bellshill, Scotland	Portland (2012)			
Scotland	Kevin Souter	Portsoy, Scotland	Kansas City (2009–10)			
Scotland	John Spencer	Glasgow, Scotland	Colorado (2001–04)			
Scotland	Danny Wilson	Livingston, Scotland	Colorado (2018–23)			
Sweden	Oskar Ågren	Malmö, Sweden	San Jose (2022)			
Sweden	Rasmus Alm	Landskrona, Sweden	St. Louis (2023–25)			
Sweden	John Alvbåge	Gothenburg, Sweden	Minnesota (2017)			
Sweden	Samuel Armenteros	Gothenburg, Sweden	Portland (2018)			
Sweden	Gustav Berggren	Göteborg, Sweden	New York Red Bulls (2025–26)			
Sweden	Johan Blomberg	Lund, Sweden	Colorado (2018–19)			
Sweden	Amin Boudri	Hässelby, Sweden	Los Angeles FC (2026)			
Sweden	Noah Eile	Lund, Sweden	New York Red Bulls (2024–25)			
Sweden	Jan Eriksson	Sundsvall, Sweden	Tampa Bay (1998–99)			
Sweden	Magnus Eriksson	Solna, Sweden	San Jose (2018–20)			
Sweden	Victor Eriksson	Värnamo, Sweden	Minnesota (2024)			
Sweden	**Emil Forsberg**	Sundsvall, Sweden	**New York Red Bulls** (2024–present)			
Sweden	Erik Friberg	Lindome, Sweden	Seattle (2011, 2015–16)			
Sweden	Markus Holgersson	Landskrona, Sweden	New York Red Bulls (2012–13)			
Sweden	Zlatan Ibrahimović	Malmö, Sweden	LA Galaxy (2018–19)			
Sweden	Stefan Ishizaki	Stockholm, Sweden	LA Galaxy (2014–15)			
Sweden	**Robin Jansson**	Trollhättan, Sweden	**Orlando** (2019–present)			
Sweden	Adam Johansson	Gothenburg, Sweden	Seattle (2012)			
Sweden	**Herman Johansson**	Örnsköldsvik, Sweden	**Dallas** (2026–present)			
Sweden	Anders Limpar	Solna, Sweden	Colorado (1999–00)			
Sweden	Freddie Ljungberg	Vittsjö, Sweden	Chicago (2010)	Seattle (2009–10)		
Sweden	Adam Lundqvist	Sweden	Austin (2023)	Houston (2018–22)		
Sweden	Mikael Marqués	Stockholm, Sweden	Minnesota (2023)			
Sweden	**Christopher McVey**	Borås, Sweden	**San Diego** (2025–present)	Inter Miami (2022–23), D.C. United (2024)		
Sweden	Joakim Nilsson	Härnösand, Sweden	St. Louis (2023–25)			
Sweden	Tom Pettersson	Trollhättan, Sweden	Cincinnati (2020–21)			
Sweden	Joel Qwiberg	Bogotá, Colombia	San Jose (2018)			
Sweden	Thomas Ravelli	Vimmerby, Sweden	Tampa Bay (1998)			
Sweden	**Amin Boudri**	Hässelby, Sweden	**Los Angeles FC** (2026–present)			
Sweden	Björn Runström	Stockholm, Sweden	New England (2012)			
Sweden	**Besard Šabović**	Stockholm, Sweden	**Austin** (2025–present)		Capped for the North Macedonia national U21 football team	
Sweden	**Anton Salétros**	Stockholm, Sweden	**Chicago** (2026–present)			
Sweden	Axel Sjöberg	Stockholm, Sweden	D.C. United (2020)	Colorado (2015–19)		
Sweden	Gustav Svensson	Gothenburg, Sweden	Seattle (2017–20)			
Sweden	Anton Tinnerholm	Linköping, Sweden	New York City FC (2018–22)			
Sweden	Christian Wilhelmsson	Malmö, Sweden	LA Galaxy (2012)			
Wales	Gareth Bale	Cardiff, Wales	Los Angeles FC (2022)			
Wales	Andy Dorman	Chester, England	New England (2004–07, 2013–15)			
Wales	Robert Earnshaw	Mufulira, Zambia	Vancouver (2015)	Toronto (2013), Chicago (2014)		
Wales	Adam Henley	Knoxville, US	Salt Lake (2018)			
Wales	Carl Robinson	Llandrindod Wells, Wales	New York Red Bulls (2010–11)	Toronto (2007–10)		

=== Southern Europe ===
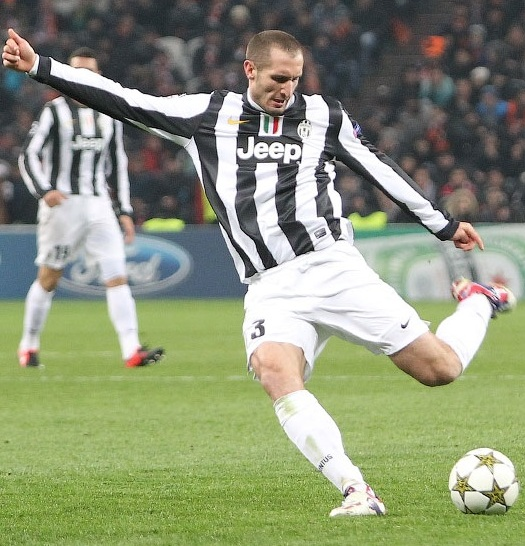
Giorgio Chiellini

Country	Name	Birthplace	Most recent MLS team	Former MLS team(s)	Notes	Refs
Albania	Shkëlzen Gashi	Zurich, Switzerland	Colorado (2016–18)		Capped for Switzerland's U17, U19 and U21 football teams	
Albania	Jahmir Hyka	Tirana, Albania	San Jose (2017–18)			
Albania	**Enea Mihaj**	Berat, Albania	**Atlanta** (2025–present)			
Albania	Hamdi Salihi	Shkodër, PSR Albania	D.C. United (2012)			
Albania	**Myrto Uzuni**	Berat, Albania	**Austin** (2025–present)			
Albania	Giacomo Vrioni	San Severino Marche, Italy	Montréal (2025)	New England (2022–24)	Capped for Italy's national U18 and U19 football teams	
Bosnia and Herzegovina	Esmir Bajraktarević	Appleton, US	New England (2022–24)		Capped for the US men's U19, U23 and national soccer teams	
Bosnia and Herzegovina	Said Fazlagić	Sarajevo, Yugoslavia	D.C. United (1996)			
Bosnia and Herzegovina	Baggio Hušidić	Zagrad, Yugoslavia	LA Galaxy (2014–18)	Chicago (2009–11)		
Bosnia and Herzegovina	**Emir Karić**	Linz, Austria	**Kansas City** (2026–present)		Capped for Austria's national U19 and U21 football teams	
Bosnia and Herzegovina	Haris Medunjanin	Sarajevo, Yugoslavia	Cincinnati (2020–22)	Philadelphia (2017–19)	Capped for the Netherlands' national U21 football team	
Bosnia and Herzegovina	Selmir Pidro	Bugojno, Bosnia and Herzegovina	St. Louis (2023)			
Bosnia and Herzegovina	Beni Redžić	Carrollton, US	Dallas (2022)		Capped for the US men's national U17 soccer team	
Bosnia and Herzegovina	Refik Šabanadžović	Tuzi, Yugoslavia	Kansas City (1998–99)			
Bosnia and Herzegovina	Siniša Ubiparipović	Zenica, Yugoslavia	Montreal (2012–13)	New York Red Bulls (2007–10)		
Croatia	Leonard Bisaku	Zagreb, Yugoslavia	Columbus (2006)			
Croatia	Stipe Biuk	Split, Crotia	Los Angeles FC (2023)			
Croatia	Toni Datković	Zagreb, Croatia	Salt Lake (2021)			
Croatia	Goran Hunjak	Zagreb, Yugoslavia	Kansas City (1998)	Tampa Bay (1996)		
Croatia	**Kristijan Kahlina**	Zagreb, Croatia	**Charlotte** (2022–present)			
Croatia	Franko Kovačević	Koprivnica, Croatia	Cincinnati (2020–21)			
Croatia	Damir Kreilach	Vukovar, Yugoslavia	Vancouver (2024–25)	Salt Lake (2018–23)		
Croatia	Marko Marić	Zagreb, Yugoslavia	Chicago (2011)			
Croatia	Marko Marić	Vienna, Austria	Houston (2020–21)		Capped for Austria's national U17 football team	
Croatia	**Tommy Mihalić**	Skokie, US	**Los Angeles FC** (2026–present)			
Croatia	Josip Mikulić	Ljubuški, Yugoslavia	Chicago (2011)			
Croatia	**Petar Musa**	Zagreb, Croatia	**Dallas** (2024–present)			
Croatia	**Marco Pašalić**	Karlsruhe, Germany	**Orlando** (2025–present)			
Croatia	Roberto Punčec	Varaždin, Croatia	Kansas City (2020–21)			
Croatia	Dario Župarić	Županja, Croatia	Portland (2020–25)		Capped for Bosnia and Herzegovina's U19 football team	
Greece	**Noah Allen**	Pembroke Pines, US	**Chicago** (2026–present)	Inter Miami (2022–26)	Capped for the US men's national U20 soccer team	
Greece	Taxiarchis Fountas	Messolonghi, Greece	D.C. United (2022–23)			
Greece	Giorgos Giakoumakis	Heraklion, Greece	Atlanta (2023–24)			
Greece	Ilias Iliadis	Toronto, Canada	Montréal (2023)			
Greece	**Alexandros Katranis**	Volos, Greece	**Salt Lake** (2024–present)			
Greece	Georgios Koutsias	Thessaloniki, Greece	Chicago (2023–24)			
Greece	Alexandros Tabakis	Athens, Greece	Atlanta (2017)			
Greece	**Nectarios Triantis**	Sydney, Australia	**Minnesota** (2025–present)		Capped for Australia's national U20 and U23 soccer teams	
Italy	Federico Bernardeschi	Carrara, Italy	Toronto (2022–25)			
Italy	**Yannick Bright**	Milan, Italy	**Inter Miami** (2024–present)			
Italy	Nicola Caricola	Bari, Italy	MetroStars (1996)			
Italy	Giorgio Chiellini	Pisa, Italy	Los Angeles (2022–23)			
Italy	Gabriele Corbo	Naples, Italy	Montréal (2022–24)			
Italy	Bernardo Corradi	Siena, Italy	Montreal (2012)			
Italy	Domenico Criscito	Cercola, Italy	Toronto (2022)			
Italy	Carlo Cudicini	Milan, Italy	LA Galaxy (2013)			
Italy	Marco Di Vaio	Rome, Italy	Montreal (2012–14)			
Italy	Marco Donadel	Conegliano, Italy	Montreal (2015–18)			
Italy	Roberto Donadoni	Cisano Bergamasco, Italy	MetroStars (1996–97)			
Italy	Matteo Ferrari	Aflou, Algeria	Montreal (2012–14)			
Italy	Giuseppe Galderisi	Salerno, Italy	Tampa Bay (1996–97)	New England (1996)		
Italy	Sebastian Giovinco	Turin, Italy	Toronto (2015–18)			
Italy	Lorenzo Insigne	Frattamaggiore, Italy	Toronto (2022–25)			
Italy	Matteo Mancosu	Cagliari, Italy	Montreal (2016–18)			
Italy	Vito Mannone	Desio, Italy	Minnesota (2019)			
Italy	José Mauri	Realicó, Argentina	Kansas City (2021–22)			
Italy	**Sebastiano Musu**		**New York City FC** (2025–present)			
Italy	Alessandro Nesta	Rome, Italy	Montreal (2012–13)			
Italy	Antonio Nocerino	Naples, Italy	Orlando (2016–17)			
Italy	Daniele Paponi	Ancona, Italy	Montreal (2013)			
Italy	Raoul Petretta	Rheinfelden, Germany	Toronto (2023–25)			
Italy	Andrea Pirlo	Flero, Italy	New York City FC (2015–17)			
Italy	Andrea Pisanu	Cagliari, Italy	Montreal (2013)			
Italy	Giuseppe Rossi	Teaneck, US	Salt Lake (2020)			
Italy	Paolo Tornaghi	Garbagnate Milanese, Italy	Vancouver (2016–17)	Chicago (2012–13)		
Italy	**Kelvin Yeboah**	Accra, Ghana	**Minnesota** (2024–present)			
Italy	Walter Zenga	Milan, Italy	New England (1997, 1999)			
Malta	Etienne Barbara	Pietà, Malta	Vancouver (2012)			
Montenegro	Mersim Beskovic		MetroStars (2001)			
Montenegro	Branko Bošković	Bačka Topola, Yugoslavia	D.C. United (2010–12)			
Montenegro	Emrah Klimenta	Rožaje, Yugoslavia	LA Galaxy (2018)			
Montenegro	Nikola Vujnović	Cetinje, Yugoslavia	Kansas City (2022)			
Montenegro	Nemanja Vuković	Titograd, Yugoslavia	Columbus (2012)			
North Macedonia	**Danny Musovski**	Henderson, US	**Seattle** (2024–present)	Los Angeles FC (2020–22), Salt Lake (2022–23)		
Portugal	Pedro Amador	Póvoa de Santa Iria, Portugal	Atlanta (2024–26)			
Portugal	**Leonardo Barroso**	Setúbal, Portugal	**Chicago** (2025–present)			
Portugal	Nuno André Coelho	Penafiel, Portugal	Kansas City (2016)			
Portugal	**David Costa**	Almada, Portugal	**Portland** (2025–present)			
Portugal	Yannick Djaló	Bissau, Guinea-Bissau	San Jose (2014)			
Portugal	**André Franco**	Lisbon, Portugal	**Chicago** (2025–present)			
Portugal	**André Gomes**	Grijó, Portugal	**Columbus** (2026–present)			
Portugal	Diogo Gonçalves	Almodôvar, Portugal	Salt Lake (2024–25)			
Portugal	José Gonçalves	Lisbon, Portugal	New England (2013–16)			
Portugal	André Horta	Almada, Portugal	Los Angeles FC (2018–19)			
Portugal	Luís Martins	Lamego, Portugal	Vancouver (2022–24)	Kansas City (2019–21)		
Portugal	João Meira	Lisbon, Portugal	Chicago (2016–17)			
Portugal	João Moutinho	Lisbon, Portugal	Orlando (2019–22)	Los Angeles FC (2018)		
Portugal	Nani	Amadora, Portugal	Orlando (2019–21)			
Portugal	João Pedro	Vermil, Portugal	LA Galaxy (2017–18)			
Portugal	Rafael Ramos	Seia, Portugal	Chicago (2018)	Orlando (2015–17)		
Portugal	Paulo Renato	Alcácer do Sal, Portugal	San Jose (2015)			
Portugal	Nuno Santos	Porto, Portugal	Charlotte (2022–23)			
Portugal	Pedro Santos	Lisbon, Portugal	D.C. United (2023–24)	Columbus (2017–22)		
Portugal	Carlos Semedo		New England (2002)			
Portugal	Xande Silva	Porto, Portugal	St. Louis (2025)	Atlanta (2024–25)		
Portugal	Sidnei Tavares	Cascais, Portugal	Colorado (2023)			
Portugal	David Viana	Strasbourg, France	Salt Lake (2012)			
Portugal	Bruno Wilson	Lisbon, Portugal	San Jose (2024–25)			
Portugal	Abel Xavier	Nampula, Mozambique	LA Galaxy (2007–08)			
Serbia	Saša Ćurčić	Belgrade, Yugoslavia	MetroStars (1999)			
Serbia	**Aleksa Cvetković**		**Vancouver** (2026–present)			
Serbia	**Mateja Đorđević**	Kruševac, Yugoslavia	**Austin** (2025–present)			
Serbia	Marko Ilić	Novi Sad, Yugoslavia	Colorado (2023)			
Serbia	**Dejan Joveljić**	Bijeljina, Bosnia and Herzegovina	**Seattle** (2026–present)	LA Galaxy (2021–24), Kansas City (2025–26)		
Serbia	Aleksandar Katai	Srbobran, Yugoslavia	LA Galaxy (2020)	Chicago (2018–20)		
Serbia	Miloš Kocić	Leskovac, Yugoslavia	Portland (2013)	D.C. United (2009), Toronto (2010–12)		
Serbia	Alen Kozić	Belgrade, Yugoslavia	Miami Fusion (1998–99)			
Serbia	**Jovan Lukić**	Valjevo, Yugoslavia	**Philadelphia** (2025–present)			
Serbia	Neven Marković	Čapljina, Yugoslavia	Kansas City (2012)			
Serbia	**Novak Mićović**	Belgrade, Yugoslavia	**LA Galaxy** (2023–present)			
Serbia	Jovan Mijatović	Belgrade, Yugoslavia	New York City FC (2024)			
Serbia	Veljko Paunović	Strumica, Yugoslavia	Philadelphia (2011)			
Serbia	Marko Perović	Kosovo Polje, Yugoslavia	New England (2010–11)			
Serbia	**Nikola Petković**	Zrenjanin, Yugoslavia	Charlotte (2024–present)	**Seattle** (2026)		
Serbia	Đorđe Petrović	Požarevac, Yugoslavia	New England (2022–23)			
Serbia	Ivan Polic	Kraljevo, Yugoslavia	LA Galaxy (2000)			
Serbia	Nemanja Radoja	Novi Sad, Yugoslavia	Kansas City (2023–25)			
Serbia	**Viktor Radojević**	Mladenovac, Yugoslavia	**Montréal** (2026–present)	Chicago (2026)		
Serbia	Aleksandar Radovanović	Šabac, Yugoslavia	Austin (2023)			
Serbia	Vuk Rašović	Dortmund, West Germany	Kansas City (2004)			
Serbia	Bratislav Ristić	Niš, Yugoslavia	Chicago (2010–11)			
Serbia	Dejan Rusmir	Belgrade, Yugoslavia	Columbus (2011)			
Serbia	Bojan Stepanović	Belgrade, Yugoslavia	Chivas USA (2009)			
Serbia	Alen Stevanović	Zurich, Switzerland	Toronto (2011)			
Serbia	Luka Stojanović	Belgrade, Yugoslavia	Chicago (2020–21)			
Serbia	Miloš Stojčev	Belgrade, Yugoslavia	Kansas City (2011)			
Serbia	Ilija Stolica	Zemun, Yugoslavia	New England (2010–11)			
Serbia	Strahinja Tanasijević	Mladenovac, Yugoslavia	New York City FC (2024–26)			
Serbia	**Ranko Veselinović**	Novi Sad, Yugoslavia	**Vancouver** (2020–present)			
Serbia	Bojan Vučković	Belgrade, Yugoslavia	New England (1996)			
Slovenia	Robert Berić	Krško, Yugoslavia	Chicago (2020–21)			
Slovenia	**David Brekalo**	Ljubljana, Slovenia	**Orlando** (2024–present)			
Slovenia	**Markus Cimermancic**	Kitchener, Canada	**Toronto** (2025–present)			
Slovenia	Antonio Delamea Mlinar	Celje, Yugoslavia	New England (2017–20)			
Slovenia	**Mitja Ilenič**	Slovenia	**New York City FC** (2023–present)			
Slovenia	Aljaž Ivačič	Ljubljana, Slovenia	New England (2024–25)	Portland (2020–24)		
Slovenia	**Žan Kolmanič**	Murska Sobota, Slovenia	**Austin** (2021–present)			
Slovenia	Aljaž Struna	Piran, Yugoslavia	Montreal (2021)	Houston (2019–21)		
Slovenia	Andraž Struna	Piran, Yugoslavia	New York City FC (2017)			
Spain	Agus	Bonete, Spain	Houston (2016)			
Spain	Ager Aketxe	Bilbao, Spain	Toronto (2018)			
Spain	**Jorge Alastuey**	Zaragoza, Spain	**Austin** (2026–present)			
Spain	Jordi Alba	L'Hospitalet de Llobregat, Spain	Inter Miami (2023–25)		Capped for the Catalonia national football team	
Spain	Pablo Álvarez	Oviedo, Spain	New York City FC (2015)		Capped for the Galicia national football team	
Spain	Eloi Amagat	Girona, Spain	New York City FC (2018)			
Spain	Angeliño	Coristanco, Spain	New York City FC (2015)			
Spain	Armando	Motril, Spain	New York Red Bulls (2014)			
Spain	Hugo Bacharach	Valencia, Spain	Minnesota (2024)			
Spain	Jon Bakero	Sitges, Spain	Toronto (2018)	Chicago (2018)		
Spain	**Jesús Barea**	Cádiz, Spain	**Salt Lake** (2025–present)			
Spain	**Juan Berrocal**	Jerez de la Frontera, Spain	**Atlanta** (2025–present)			
Spain	Miguel Berry	Barcelona, Spain	LA Galaxy (2024–25)	Columbus (2020–22), D.C. United (2022), Atlanta (2023)		
Spain	**Pep Biel**	Sant Joan, Spain	**Charlotte** (2024–present)			
Spain	Ruben Bover	Mallorca, Spain	New York Red Bulls (2013–14)			
Spain	Sergio Busquets	Sabadell, Spain	Inter Miami (2023–25)		Capped for the Catalonia national football team	
Spain	Pep Casas	Barcelona, Spain	Inter Miami (2024)			
Spain	Albert Celades	Barcelona, Spain	New York Red Bulls (2009)			
Spain	Christian	Santander, Spain	D.C. United (2014)			
Spain	**Alonso Coello**	Madrid, Spain	**Toronto** (2023–present)			
Spain	Jon Erice	Pamplona, Spain	Vancouver (2019)			
Spain	**Arnau Farnós**	Riudoms, Spain	**New York City FC** (2026–present)			
Spain	Joaquín Fernández	Huércal de Almería, Spain	Kansas City (2024–25)			
Spain	Andreu Fontàs	Banyoles, Spain	Kansas City (2018–24)		Capped for the Catalonia national football team	
Spain	Dani Fragoso	Mataró, Spain	Chivas USA (2014)			
Spain	Manu García	Oviedo, Spain	Kansas City (2025–26)			
Spain	**Carles Gil**	Valencia, Spain	**New England** (2019–present)			
Spain	Nacho Gil	Valencia, Spain	New England (2022–24)			
Spain	Mario González	Villarcayo, Spain	Los Angeles FC (2023)			
Spain	Alejandro Granados	Alicante, Spain	Orlando (2023)			
Spain	Asier Illarramendi	Mutriku, Spain	Dallas (2023–24)		Capped for the Basque Country national football team	
Spain	Andoni Iraola	Usurbil, Spain	New York City FC (2015–16)		Capped for the Basque Country national football team	
Spain	**Iván Jaime**	Málaga, Spain	**Montréal** (2025–present)			
Spain	Jesús Jiménez	Leganés, Spain	Toronto, Dallas (2022–23)			
Spain	Aitor Karanka	Vitoria, Spain	Colorado (2006)		Capped for the Basque Country national football team	
Spain	Koke	Málaga, Spain	Houston (2011)			
Spain	Bojan Krkić	Linyola, Spain	Montreal (2019–20)		Capped for the Catalonia national football team	
Spain	Gorka Larrea	San Sebastián, Spain	Montreal (2014)			
Spain	Cristian Lobato	Esparreguera, Spain	Kansas City (2017–18)			
Spain	Ignacio Maganto	Madrid, Spain	LA Galaxy (2015)			
Spain	José Mari	Rota, Spain	Colorado (2014)			
Spain	**Adrián Marín**	Torre-Pacheco, Spain	**Orlando** (2025–present)			
Spain	José Martínez	La Palma del Condado, Spain	Dallas (2021–23)			
Spain	David Mateos	Madrid, Spain	Orlando (2015–16)			
Spain	Álvaro Medrán	Dos Torres, Spain	Chicago (2020–21)			
Spain	**Brais Méndez**	Mos, Spain	**Columbus** (2026–present)			
Spain	Mista	Caravaca de la Cruz	Toronto (2010)			
Spain	José Luis Morales	Madrid, Spain	New England (2000)			
Spain	Alfredo Ortuño	Yecla, Spain	Salt Lake (2018)			
Spain	**Sergi Palencia**	Badalona, Spain	**Los Angeles FC** (2023–present)			
Spain	Javier Pérez	Valencia, Spain	Los Angeles FC (2019)			
Spain	Víctor Pérez	Albacete, Spain	Chicago (2015)			
Spain	Alejandro Pozuelo	Seville, Spain	Inter Miami (2022)	Toronto (2019–22)		
Spain	Riqui Puig	Matadepera, Spain	LA Galaxy (2022–24)			
Spain	Jordi Quintillà	Lleida, Spain	Kansas City (2015–16)			
Spain	**Sergio Reguilón**	Madrid, Spain	**Inter Miami** (2026–)			
Spain	Álvaro Rey	Seville, Spain	Columbus (2014)	Toronto (2013–14)		
Spain	**Sergi Roberto**	Reus, Spain	**LA Galaxy** (2026–present)		Capped for the Catalonia national football team	
Spain	David Rocha	Cáceres, Spain	Houston (2016)			
Spain	Raúl Rodríguez	Barcelona, Spain	Houston (2015–16)		Capped for the Catalonia national football team	
Spain	Víctor Rodríguez	Barberà del Vallès, Spain	Seattle (2017–19)		Capped for the Catalonia national football team	
Spain	Oriol Rosell	Puig-reig, Spain	LA Galaxy (2023)	Kansas City (2012–14, 2022), Orlando, (2018–21)	Capped for the Catalonia national football team	
Spain	Sergio Ruiz	El Astillero, Spain	Charlotte (2022)			
Spain	**Ilie Sánchez**	Barcelona, Spain	**Austin** (2025–present)	Kansas City (2017–21), Los Angeles FC, (2022–24)		
Spain	**Sergi Solans**	Lleida, Spain	**Salt Lake** (2026–)			
Spain	Cristian Tello	Sabadell, Spain	Los Angeles FC (2022)			
Spain	Toni	A Coruña, Spain	Kansas City (2014)			
Spain	Carlos Varela	Geneva, Switzerland	D.C. United (2010)			
Spain	Víctor Vázquez	Barcelona, Spain	Toronto, (2017–18, 2023)	LA Galaxy (2021–22)		
Spain	David Villa	Langreo, Spain	New York City FC (2015–18)			
Spain	**Loïc Williams**	Valencia, Spain	**Colorado** (2026–present)			

=== Transcontinental and West Asia ===
Country	Name	Birthplace	Most recent MLS team	Former MLS team(s)	Notes	Refs
Armenia	Artur Aghasyan	Yerevan, Armenia	Salt Lake (2011)			
Armenia	David Arshakyan	Saint Petersburg, Russia	Chicago (2016–17)			
Armenia	Harut Karapetyan	Yerevan, Soviet Union	San Jose (2000)	LA Galaxy (1996–98), Tampa Bay (1999)		
Armenia	Yura Movsisyan	Leninakan, Soviet Union	Chicago (2006–09, 2018)	Kansas City (2006–07), Salt Lake (2007–09, 2016–18)		
Armenia	Lucas Zelarayán	Córdoba, Argentina	Columbus (2020–23)			
Azerbaijan	Nariman Akhundzade	Baku, Azerbaijan	Columbus (2026)			
Cyprus	Marinos Tzionis	Nicosia, Cyprus	Kansas City (2022–24)			
Georgia (Georgia (country))	Guram Kashia	Tbilisi, Georgia	San Jose (2018–20)			
Georgia (Georgia (country))	**Saba Lobzhanidze**	Tbilisi, Georgia	**Salt Lake** (2026–present)	Atlanta (2023–26)		
Georgia (Georgia (country))	**Anzor Mekvabishvili**	Tbilisi, Georgia	**Chicago** (2026–present)			
Georgia (Georgia (country))	Valeri Qazaishvili	Ozurgeti, Georgia	San Jose (2017–20)			
Israel	**Liel Abada**	Petah Tikva, Israel	**Charlotte** (2024–)			
Israel	**Sayed Abu Farchi**	Baqa al-Gharbiyye, Israel	**Colorado** (2026–present)			
Israel	**Tai Baribo**	Eilat, Israel	**D.C. United** (2026–present)	Philadelphia (2023–25)		
Israel	Orr Barouch	Haifa, Israel	Chicago (2011–12)			
Israel	Dedi Ben Dayan	Holon, Israel	Colorado (2005–06)			
Israel	**Ran Binyamin**	Beer Sheva, Israel	**Dallas** (2026–)			
Israel	**Or Blorian**	Petah Tikva, Israel	**Kansas City** (2026–)			
Israel	Omer Damari	Rishon LeZion, Israel	New York Red Bulls (2016)			
Israel	**Ilay Feingold**	Netanya, Israel	**New England** (2025–present)			
Israel	**Idan Gorno**	Netanya, Israel	**Charlotte** (2024–present)			
Israel	Gadi Kinda	Addis Ababa, Ethiopia	Kansas City (2020–21, 2023)			
Israel	Guy Melamed	Haifa, Israel	Colorado (2005)			
Israel	**Dor Turgeman**	Ashdod, Israel	**New England** (2025–)			
Turkey	Sercan Güvenışık	Ankara, Turkey	San Jose (2012)			
Turkey	Cengiz Ünder	Sındırgı, Turkey	Los Angeles FC (2025)			

=== Western Europe ===
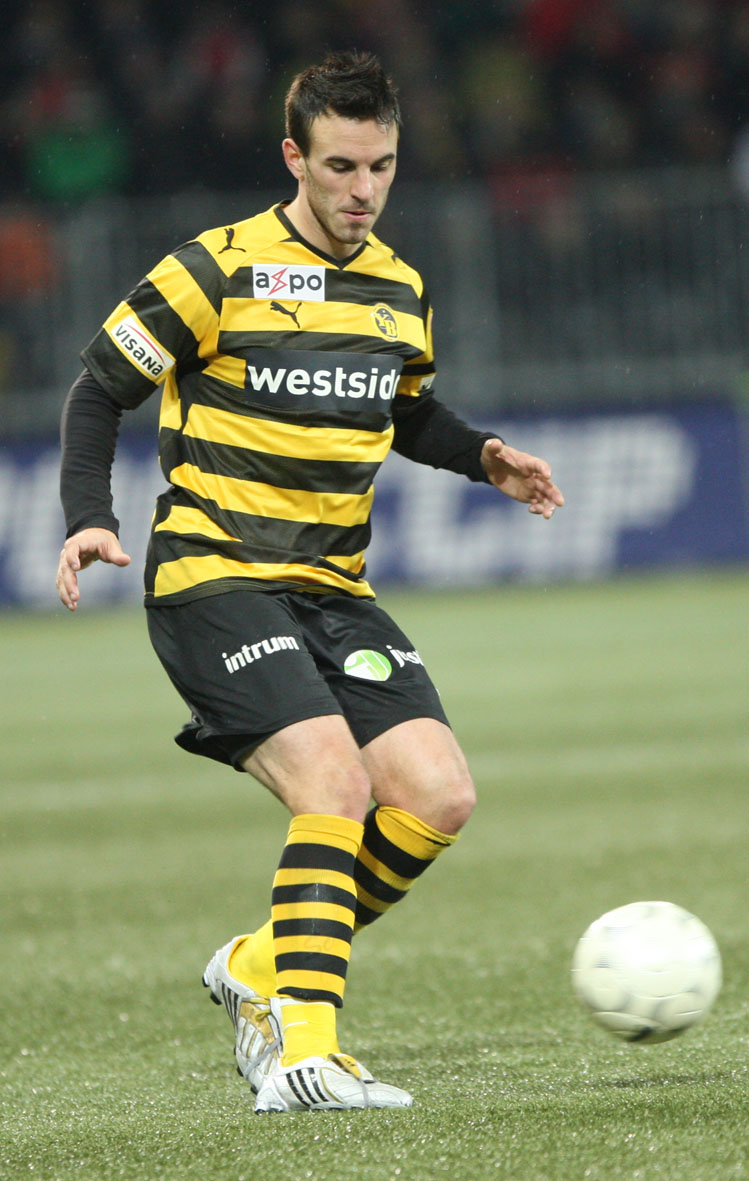
Scott Sutter

Country	Name	Birthplace	Most recent MLS team	Former MLS team(s)	Notes	Refs
Austria	Dominik Fitz	Wien, Austria	Minnesota (2025–26)			
Austria	Christian Fuchs	Neunkirchen, Austria	Charlotte (2022)			
Austria	Michael Gspurning	Graz, Austria	Seattle (2012–13)			
Austria	Andi Herzog	Vienna, Austria	LA Galaxy (2004)			
Austria	Andreas Ivanschitz	Eisenstadt, Austria	Seattle (2015–16)			
Austria	Ercan Kara	Vienna, Austria	Orlando (2022–23)			
Austria	Ernst Öbster	Salzburg, Austria	New York Red Bulls (2009)			
Austria	Thomas Piermayr	Linz, Austria	Colorado (2014)			
Austria	Emanuel Pogatetz	Graz, Austria	Columbus (2014–15)			
Austria	Daniel Royer	Schladming, Austria	New York Red Bulls (2016–21)			
Austria	**David Schnegg**	Mils bei Imst, Austria	**Charlotte** (2026–present)	D.C. United (2024–25)		
Austria	Alessandro Schöpf	Umhausen, Austria	Vancouver (2022–24)			
Austria	Markus Schopp	Graz, Austria	New York Red Bulls (2006–07)			
Austria	**Hannes Wolf**	Graz, Austria	**New York City FC** (2024–present)			
Belgium	Christian Benteke	Kinshasa, Zaire	D.C. United (2022–25)			
Belgium	Laurent Ciman	Farciennes, Belgium	Toronto (2019–20)	Montreal (2015–17) Los Angeles FC (2018)		
Belgium	Hugo Cuypers	Liège, Belgium	Chicago (2024–26)			
Belgium	Brecht Dejaegere	Handzame, Belgium	Charlotte (2023–24)			
Belgium	Nansha Kalonji	Brussels, Belgium	MetroStars (1999)			
Belgium	Roland Lamah	Abidjan, Ivory Coast	Cincinnati (2019)	Dallas (2017–18)		
Belgium	**Joyeux Masanka Bungi**	Berchem-Sainte-Agathe, Belgium	**New York Red Bulls** (2026–)			
Belgium	Logan Ndenbe	Mouscron, Belgium	Kansas City (2022–25)			
Belgium	Jelle Van Damme	Lokeren, Belgium	LA Galaxy (2016–17)			
Belgium	Dante Vanzeir	Beringen, Belgium	New York Red Bulls (2023–24)			
Belgium	Mikael Yourassowsky	Brussels, Belgium	Toronto (2011)			
France	Romain Alessandrini	Marseille, France	LA Galaxy (2017–19)			
France	Mouloud Akloul	Lorient, France	Vancouver (2011)			
France	Julien Baudet	Grenoble, France	Colorado (2009–10)			
France	Pascal Bedrossian	Marseille, France	Chicago (2006–07)			
France	Nicolas Benezet	Montpellier, France	Seattle (2021)	Toronto (2019), Colorado (2020–21)		
France	Vincent Bezecourt	Aire-sur-l'Adour, France	New York Red Bulls (2017–19)			
France	Frédéric Brillant	Sedan, France	D.C. United (2018–21)	New York City FC (2016–17)		
France	Kévin Cabral	Paris, France	Colorado (2021–25)	LA Galaxy (2021–22)		
France	Rémi Cabral	Paris, France	Colorado (2023)			
France	**Rudy Camacho**	L'Arbresle, France	**Columbus** (2026–present)	Montreal (2018–23)		
France	Hassoun Camara	Noisy-le-Sec, France	Montreal (2012–17)			
France	**Dylan Chambost**	Annecy, France	**Columbus** (2024–present)			
France	Benoît Cheyrou	Suresnes, France	Toronto (2015–17)			
France	Michaël Ciani	Clichy-la-Garenne, France	LA Galaxy (2017–18)			
France	Abdoulaye Cissoko	Sèvres, France	Seattle (2021–23)			
France	Aurélien Collin	Enghien-les-Bains, France	Philadelphia (2019)	Kansas City (2011–14), Orlando (2015–16), New York Red Bulls (2016–18)		
France	Yohan Croizet	Sarrebourg, France	Kansas City (2018–19)			
France	Séga Coulibaly	Bamako, Mali	LA Galaxy (2021–23)			
France	Laurent Courtois	Lyon, France	LA Galaxy (2013)	Chivas USA (2011–13)		
France	Ousmane Dabo	Laval, France	New England (2011)			
France	Mathieu Deplagne	Pau, France	Cincinnati (2019–20)			
France	Bradley Diallo	Marseille, France	LA Galaxy (2017)			
France	**Djibril Diani**	Créteil, France	**Charlotte** (2024–present)			
France	Claude Dielna	Portland (2019)	New England (2017–18)			
France	Sofiane Djeffal	Nantes, France	Austin (2023)	D.C. United (2022)		
France	Youri Djorkaeff	Lyon, France	New York Red Bulls (2005–06)			
France	Didier Domi	Sarcelles, France	New England (2011)			
France	**Enzo Dovlo**		**Atlanta** (2026–present)			
France	Rod Fanni	Martigues, France	Montreal (2018–20)			
France	**Owen Gene**	Nanterre, France	**Minnesota** (2025–present)			
France	**Joran Gerbet**	Saint-Laurent-du-Pape, France	**Orlando** (2025–present)			
France	Olivier Giroud	Chambéry, France	Los Angeles FC (2024–25)			
France	**Nicksoen Gomis**	Évreux, France	**Toronto** (2024–present)			
France	Samuel Grandsir	Évreux, France	LA Galaxy (2021–22)			
France	**Antoine Griezmann**	Mâcon, France	**Orlando** (2026–present)			
France	Léandre Griffit	Maubeuge, France	Columbus (2010–11)			
France	Eric Hassli	Sarreguemines, France	Dallas (2013)	Vancouver (2011–12), Toronto (2012)		
France	Thierry Henry	Les Ulis, France	New York Red Bulls (2010–14)			
France	Adrien Hunou	Évry, France	Minnesota (2021–22)			
France	Elie Ikangu	Paris, France	New York Red Bulls (2006–07)			
France	Nicolas Isimat-Mirin	Meudon, France	Kansas City (2021–22)			
France	Bertin Jacquesson	Lorrez-le-Bocage, France	Salt Lake (2023)			
France	Corentin Jean	Blois, France	Inter Miami (2022–23)			
France	Sébastien Le Toux	Mont-Saint-Aignan, France	D.C. United (2017)	Seattle (2007–08), Philadelphia (2010–11), Vancouver (2012), New York Red Bulls (2012), Colorado (2016)		
France	**Hugo Lloris**	Nice, France	**Los Angeles FC** (2024–present)			
France	Peter Luccin	Marseille, France	Dallas (2013–14)			
France	Péguy Luyindula	Kinshasa, Zaire	New York Red Bulls (2013–14)			
France	Adilson Malanda	Rouen, France	Charlotte (2022–25)			
France	**Paul Marie**	Saint-Aubin-des-Bois, France	**San Jose** (2019–present)			
France	Blaise Matuidi	Toulouse, France	Inter Miami (2020–21)			
France	**Youssef Maziz**	Thionville, France	**Colorado** (2026–present)			
France	**Kenji Mboma**		**Cincinnati** (2025–present)			
France	Laurent Merlin	Marseille, France	Chivas USA (2007)			
France	David Milinković	Antibes, France	Vancouver (2020)			
France	Wilfried Moimbé	Vichy, France	Minnesota (2019)			
France	**Tristan Muyumba**	Paris, France	**Atlanta** (2023–present)			
France	Vincent Nogueira	Besançon, France	Philadelphia (2014–16)			
France	Damien Perrinelle	Suresnes, France	New York Red Bulls (2014–17)			
France	Hugo Picard	Cholet, France	Columbus (2025–26)			
France	Jean-Baptiste Pierazzi	Ajaccio, France	San Jose (2014–15)			
France	Laurent Robert	Saint-Benoît, Réunion	Toronto (2008)			
France	Bacary Sagna	Sens, France	Montreal (2018–19)			
France	**Allan Saint-Maximin**	Châtenay-Malabry, France	**Charlotte** (2026–present)			
France	Saër Sène	Paris, France	New York Red Bulls (2014)	New England (2012–14)		
France	Mikaël Silvestre	Chambray-lès-Tours, France	Portland (2013)			
France	Clément Simonin	Ploemeur, France	Toronto (2015)			
France	Florent Sinama Pongolle	Saint-Pierre, Réunion	Chicago (2014)			
France	Arnaud Souquet	Paris, France	Chicago (2023–24)			
France	Diedie Traore	Paris, France	LA Galaxy (2019–20)			
France	Florian Valot	Pau, France	Cincinnati (2021)	New York Red Bulls (2018–21)		
France	Rémi Walter	Essey-lès-Nancy, France	Kansas City (2021–24)			
Germany	Stefan Aigner	Munich, West Germany	Colorado (2017–18)			
Germany	**Timo Baumgartl**	Böblingen, Germany	**St. Louis** (2025–present)			
Germany	Julian Büscher	Soest, Germany	D.C. United (2016–17)			
Germany	**Noel Caliskan**	Cologne, Germany	**Salt Lake** (2024–present)	Portland (2023)		
Germany	Rafael Czichos	Jeddah, Saudi Arabia	Chicago (2022–24)			
Germany	**Niklas Dorsch**	Lichtenfels, Germany	**Toronto** (2026–present)			
Germany	**Morris Duggan**	Kirchheim bei München, Germany	**Minnesota** (2024–present)			
Germany	**Lawrence Ennali**	Berlin, Germany	**Houston** (2024–present)			
Germany	Arne Friedrich	Bad Oeynhausen, West Germany	Chicago (2012)			
Germany	Torsten Frings	Würselen, West Germany	Toronto (2011–12)			
Germany	Andreas Görlitz	Weilheim, West Germany	San Jose (2014)			
Germany	Alexander Hack	Memmingen, Germany	New York Red Bulls (2025)			
Germany	Marcel Hartel	Cologne, Germany	St. Louis (2024–26)			
Germany	**Fabian Herbers**	Ahaus, Germany	**Montréal** (2015–present)	Philadelphia (2016–18), Chicago (2019–24)		
Germany	Kai Herdling	Heidelberg, West Germany	Philadelphia (2012)			
Germany	Jannes Horn	Braunschweig, Germany	St. Louis (2024–25)			
Germany	Florian Jungwirth	Gräfelfing, Germany	Vancouver (2021–22)	San Jose (2017–21)		
Germany	Kevin Kratz	Eschweiler, West Germany	Atlanta (2017–19)			
Germany	Kenneth Kronholm	Fort Belvoir, US	Chicago (2019–20)			
Germany	Florian Lechner	Ellwangen, West Germany	New England (2012)			
Germany	Tim Leibold	Böblingen, Germany	Kansas City (2023–25)			
Germany	Jasper Löffelsend	Cologne, Germany	Colorado (2024)	San Diego (2025), Salt Lake (2022–23)		
Germany	**Eduard Löwen**	Idar-Oberstein, Germany	**San Jose** (2026–present)	St. Louis (2023–26)		
Germany	**Ben Lundt**	Berlin, Germany	**St. Louis** (2023–present)			
Germany	**Maurice Malone**	Augsburg, Germany	**Minnesota** (2026–present)			
Germany	Lothar Matthäus	Erlangen, West Germany	MetroStars (2000)			
Germany	**Hany Mukhtar**	Berlin, Germany	**Nashville** (2020–present)			
Germany	Luis Müller		Los Angeles FC (2024)			
Germany	**Thomas Müller**	Weilheim in Oberbayern, Germany	**Vancouver** (2025–present)			
Germany	Timo Pitter	Schweinfurt, Germany	Dallas (2016)			
Germany	**Marco Reus**	Dortmund, West Germany	**LA Galaxy** (2024–present)			
Germany	Frank Rost	Karl-Marx-Stadt, East Germany	New York Red Bulls (2011)			
Germany	Marc Rzatkowski	Bochum, West Germany	New York Red Bulls (2018–20)			
Germany	Sebastian Schonlau	Warburg, Germany	Vancouver (2026)			
Germany	Bastian Schweinsteiger	Kolbermoor, West Germany	Chicago (2017–19)			
Germany	**Amar Sejdić**	Berlin, Germany	**Columbus** (2025–present)	Montréal (2019–21), Atlanta (2021–23), Nashville (2024)		
Germany	Oliver Semmle	Au am Rhein, Germany	Philadelphia (2024)			
Germany	**Armindo Sieb**	Halle, Germany	**Los Angeles FC** (2026–present)			
Germany	Cedric Teuchert	Coburg, Germany	St. Louis (2024–26)			
Germany	**Erik Thommy**	Ulm, Germany	**LA Galaxy** (2026–present)	Kansas City (2022–25)		
Germany	Christian Tiffert	Halle an der Saale, East Germany	Seattle (2012)			
Germany	Mandi Urbas	Munich, West Germany	Dallas (2003)			
Germany	**Robert Voloder**	Frankfurt, Germany	**New York Red Bulls** (2026–present)	Kansas City (2022–25)	Capped for Bosnia and Herzegovina's national U17, U18 and U19 football teams	
Germany	**Kai Wagner**	Geislingen an der Steige, Germany	**Philadelphia** (2019–present)			
Germany	**Timo Werner**	Stuttgart, Germany	**San Jose** (2026–present)			
Germany	Gordon Wild	Leonberg, Germany	LA Galaxy (2020)			
Liechtenstein	Nicolas Hasler	Vaduz, Liechtenstein	Kansas City (2019)	Toronto (2017–18), Chicago (2018–19)		
Luxembourg	Maxime Chanot	Nancy, France	Los Angeles FC (2024–25)	New York City FC (2016–23)		
Netherlands	Alexander Büttner	Doetinchem, Netherlands	New England (2020)			
Netherlands	Geoffrey Castillion	Amsterdam, Netherlands	New England (2014)			
Netherlands	Nigel de Jong	Amsterdam, Netherlands	LA Galaxy (2016)			
Netherlands	Siem de Jong	Aigle, Switzerland	Cincinnati (2020)			
Netherlands	Michael de Leeuw	Goirle, Netherlands	Chicago (2016–18)			
Netherlands	Raimo de Vries	Den Helder, Netherlands	Colorado (1996)			
Netherlands	Javairô Dilrosun	Amsterdam, Netherlands	Los Angeles FC (2025)			
Netherlands	Rachid El Khalifi	Rotterdam, Netherlands	Salt Lake (2009)			
Netherlands	John Goossens	Heemstede, Netherlands	Chicago (2016–18)			
Netherlands	Edwin Gorter	The Hague, Netherlands	Miami Fusion (1999)	New England (1998–99)		
Netherlands	Richard Goulooze	Alkmaar, Netherlands	New England (1998–99)			
Netherlands	Danny Hoesen	Heerlen, Netherlands	Austin (2021–22)	San Jose (2018–20)		
Netherlands	**Vincent Janssen**	Heesch, Netherlands	**Portland** (2026–present)			
Netherlands	Collins John	Zwedru, Liberia	Chicago (2010)			
Netherlands	Johan Kappelhof	Amsterdam, Netherlands	Salt Lake (2022)	Chicago (2016–21)		
Netherlands	Danny Koevermans	Schiedam, Netherlands	Toronto (2011–13)			
Netherlands	Kai Koreniuk	Ormond Beach, US	LA Galaxy (2020)		Capped for the US national men's U17 soccer team	
Netherlands	Sherjill MacDonald	Amsterdam, Netherlands	Chicago (2012–13)			
Netherlands	**Tyrell Malacia**	Rotterdam, Netherlands	**Cincinnati** (2026–present)			
Netherlands	Nick Marsman	Zwolle, Netherlands	Inter Miami (2021–22)			
Netherlands	Nigel Robertha	Dordrecht, Netherlands	D.C. United (2021–23)			
Netherlands	Victor Sikora	Deventer, Netherlands	Dallas (2008)			
Netherlands	Nick Soolsma	Andijk, Netherlands	Toronto (2011–12)			
Netherlands	Wessel Speel	Gouda, Netherlands	Minnesota (2025)			
Netherlands	**Stijn Spierings**	Alkmaar, Netherlands	**Salt Lake** (2026–present)			
Netherlands	**Osaze Urhoghide**	Nijmegen, Netherlands	**Dallas** (2025–present)			
Netherlands	Pele van Anholt	Sneek, Netherlands	LA Galaxy (2017–18)			
Netherlands	Dave van den Bergh	Amsterdam, Netherlands	Dallas (2009)	Kansas City (2006), New York Red Bulls (2007–08)		
Netherlands	Silvester van der Water	Blaricum, Netherlands	Orlando (2021–22)			
Netherlands	Maikel van der Werff	Hoorn, Netherlands	Cincinnati (2019–20)			
Netherlands	Gregory van der Wiel	Amsterdam, Netherlands	Toronto (2018)			
Netherlands	Kenneth Vermeer	Amsterdam, Netherlands	Cincinnati (2021)	Los Angeles FC (2020–21)		
Netherlands	Ronald Waterreus	Lemiers, Netherlands	New York Red Bulls (2007)			
Netherlands	Giliano Wijnaldum	Rotterdam, Netherlands	Philadelphia (2017)			
Netherlands	Vito Wormgoor	Leersum, Netherlands	Columbus (2020–21)			
Switzerland	François Affolter	Biel, Switzerland	San Jose (2017–19)			
Switzerland	Allan Arigoni	Zurich, Switzerland	Chicago (2024)			
Switzerland	Tranquillo Barnetta	St. Gallen, Switzerland	Philadelphia (2015–16)			
Switzerland	Leonardo Bertone	Wohlen bei Bern, Switzerland	Cincinnati (2019)			
Switzerland	**Roman Bürki**	Münsingen, Switzerland	**St. Louis** (2023–present)			
Switzerland	Davide Chiumiento	Heiden, Switzerland	Vancouver (2011–12)		Called for Italy's national U21 football team	
Switzerland	Maxime Dominguez	Geneva, Switzerland	Toronto (2025)			
Switzerland	Blerim Džemaili	Tetovo, Yugoslavia	Montreal (2017)			
Switzerland	Jonas Elmer	Zurich, Switzerland	Toronto (2013)			
Switzerland	**Breel Embolo**	Yaoundé, Cameroon	**Atlanta** (2026–present)			
Switzerland	Innocent Emeghara	Lagos, Nigeria	San Jose (2015–16)			
Switzerland	**Stefan Frei**	Altstätten, Netherlands	**Seattle** (2014–present)	Toronto (2009–11, 2013)		
Switzerland	**Maren Haile-Selassie**	Zurich, Switzerland	**Chicago** (2023–present)			
Switzerland	**Silvan Hefti**	Rorschach, Switzerland	**D.C. United** (2026–present)			
Switzerland	Dennis Iapichino	Frauenfeld, Switzerland	D.C. United (2013)	Montreal (2012–13)		
Switzerland	Eldin Jakupović	Kozarac, Yugoslavia	Los Angeles FC (2023)		Capped for Bosnia and Herzegovina's national U21 football team	
Switzerland	Chris Kablan	Lucerne, Switzerland	Salt Lake (2022)			
Switzerland	Blaise Nkufo	Kinshasa, Zaire	Seattle (2010)			
Switzerland	Alain Rochat	Saint-Jean-sur-Richelieu, Canada	D.C. United (2013)	Vancouver (2011–13)		
Switzerland	Philippe Senderos	Geneva, Switzerland	Houston (2017–18)			
Switzerland	Xherdan Shaqiri	Gjilan, Yugoslavia	Chicago (2022–24)			
Switzerland	**Noah Streit**	Biel, Switzerland	**Montréal** (2026–present)			
Switzerland	Alain Sutter	Bern, Switzerland	Dallas (1997–98)			
Switzerland	Scott Sutter	Enfield, England	Vancouver (2019)	Orlando (2017–18)		
Switzerland	Jérôme Thiesson	Switzerland	Minnesota (2017–18)			
Switzerland	Raphaël Wicky	Leuggern, Switzerland	Chivas USA (2008)			
Switzerland	Adrian Winter	Thalwil, Switzerland	Orlando (2015–16)			
Switzerland	Reto Ziegler	Geneva, Switzerland	Dallas (2018–20)			

== North and Central America, Caribbean (CONCACAF) ==
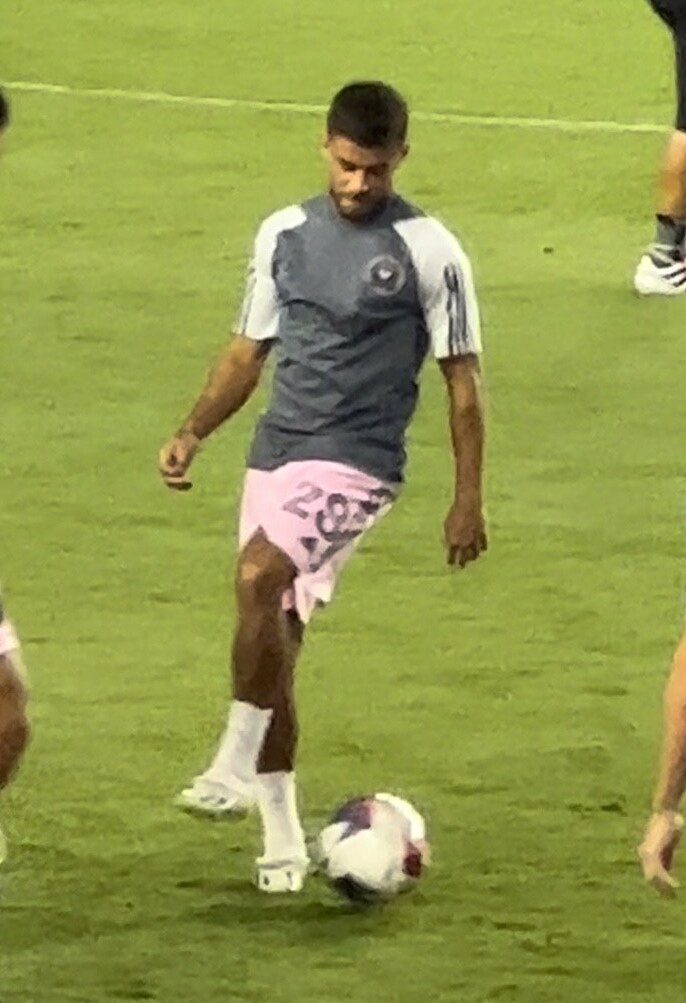
Edison Azcona

=== Caribbean Zone ===
Country	Name	Birthplace	Most recent MLS team	Former MLS team(s)	Notes	Refs
Antigua and Barbuda	Dion Pereira	Watford, England	Atlanta (2019)			
Barbabos (Barbados)	Jamal Blackman	Croydon, England	Los Angeles FC (2021)		Capped for England's U16, U17, U19 football teams	
Bermuda	Freddy Hall	St. George's, Bermuda	Toronto (2012)			
Bermuda	Reggie Lambe	Hamilton, Bermuda	Toronto (2012–13)			
Bermuda	Khano Smith	Paget, Bermuda	New York Red Bulls (2009)	New England (2005–08)		
Cuba	Osvaldo Alonso	San Cristóbal, Cuba	Atlanta (2022–23)	Seattle (2009–18), Minnesota (2019–21)		
Cuba	Yordany Álvarez	Cienfuegos, Cuba	Salt Lake (2011–13)			
Cuba	Maikel Chang	Havana, Cuba	Salt Lake (2020–24)			
Cuba	Jorge Corrales	Pinar del Río, Cuba	Montreal (2019–20)	Chicago (2017–19)		
Cuba	Alberto Delgado	Havana, Cuba	Colorado (2004)			
Cuba	Maykel Galindo	Villa Clara, Cuba	Dallas (2011)	Chivas USA (2007–10)		
Cuba	Rey Ángel Martínez	Havana, Cuba	Colorado (2004)			
Cuba	Eduardo Sebrango	Sancti Spiritus, Cuba	Montreal (2012)			
Curaçao	Jürgen Locadia	Emmen, Netherlands	Cincinnati (2020–21)		Capped for the Netherlands national U17, U18, U19, U20 and U21 football teams	
Curaçao	Javier Martina	Willemstad, Curaçao	Toronto (2011)		Capped for the Netherlands national U19 and U20 football teams	
Curaçao	Eloy Room	Nijmegen, Netherlands	Columbus (2019–23)		Capped for the Netherlands national U20 football team	
Curaçao	**Cherrion Valerius**	Rotterdam, Netherlands	**Minnesota** (2026–present)			
Dominican Republic	Edison Azcona	La Romana Dominican Republic	Inter Miami (2021–23)			
Dominican Republic	Israel Boatwright	Grand Rapids, US	Inter Miami (2023)			
Grenada	Kharlton Belmar	Virginia Beach	Kansas City (2017–18)			
Grenada	**Darius Johnson**	Chelsea, England	**San Jose** (2026–present)			
Grenada	Shalrie Joseph	St. George's, Grenada	New England (2003–12, 2014)	Chivas USA (2012), Seattle (2013)		
Grenada	Craig Rocastle	Lewisham, England	Kansas City (2010–11)			
Guadeloupe	Stéphane Auvray	Les Abymes, Guadeloupe	New York Red Bulls (2011)	Kansas City (2010–11)		
Guadeloupe	Miguel Comminges	Les Abymes, Guadeloupe	Colorado (2011)			
Guadeloupe	Eddy Viator	Colombes, France	Toronto (2011)			
Guadeloupe	Ronald Zubar	Les Abymes, Guadeloupe	New York Red Bulls (2015–16)		Capped for France's national U21 football team	
Guyana	Warren Creavalle	Acworth, US	Philadelphia (2015–20)	Houston (2012–14), Toronto (2014–15)	Capped for the US men's national U20 soccer team	
Guyana	Osaze De Rosario	San Jose, US	Seattle (2025–26)			
Guyana	**Omari Glasgow**	Beterverwagting, Guyana	**Chicago** (2024–present)			
Guyana	Gregory Richardson	Georgetown, Guyana	Colorado (2009)			
Guyana	J. P. Rodrigues	Lutz, US	D.C. United (2010)			
Guyana	Emery Welshman	Mississauga, Canada	Toronto (2013)			
Haiti	Jean Alexandre	Verrettes, Haiti	San Jose (2012)	Salt Lake (2009–11)		
Haiti	Shanyder Borgelin	Margate, US	Inter Miami (2023–24)			
Haiti	Alexandre Boucicaut	Port-au-Prince, Haiti	Chicago (2004)			
Haiti	Steward Ceus	West Haverstraw, US	Colorado (2012–13)			
Haiti	**Lovend's Delinois**		**Inter Miami** (2026–present)			
Haiti	**Derrick Etienne**	Richmond, US	**Toronto** (2024–present)	New York Red Bulls (2016–19), Cincinnati (2019), Columbus (2020–22), Atlanta (2023–24)		
Haiti	Lesly Fellinga	Port-au-Prince, Haiti	Toronto (2009)		Capped for the Netherlands national football team	
Haiti	Zachary Herivaux	Suita, Japan	New England (2016, 2018)			
Haiti	Andrew Jean-Baptiste	New York City, US	Chivas USA (2014)	Portland (2012–13)	Capped for the US men's national U18 soccer team	
Haiti	**Danley Jean Jacques**	Petit-Goâve, Haiti	**Philadelphia** (2024–present)			
Haiti	Mechack Jérôme	Liancourt, Haiti	Kansas City (2013–14)			
Haiti	Peterson Joseph	Port-au-Prince	Kansas City (2011–13)			
Haiti	Jerrod Laventure	Middle Island, US	New York Red Bulls (2006–07)			
Haiti	Louicius Deedson	Tabarre, Haiti	Dallas (2025–26)			
Haiti	**Ricky Louis**		**Dallas** (2026–present)			
Haiti	James Marcelin	Saint-Marc, Haiti	Dallas (2012)	Portland (2011–12)		
Haiti	Josué Mayard	Montreal, Canada	Dallas (2001–02)			
Haiti	Soni Mustivar	Aubervilliers, France	Kansas City (2015–17)		Capped for France's national U20 football team	
Haiti	Fabrice Noël	Gressier, Haiti	Colorado (2005–06)			
Haiti	Woobens Pacius	Terrebonne, Canada	Nashville (2026)			
Haiti	Peguero Jean Philippe	Gonaïves, Haiti	San Jose (2008)	Colorado (2004–06), New York Red Bulls (2006)		
Haiti	**Fafà Picault**	New York City, US	**Atlanta** (2026–present)	Philadelphia (2017–19), Dallas (2020), Houston (2021–22), Nashville (2023), Vancouver (2024), Inter Miami (2025)	Capped for the US men's national soccer team	
Haiti	**Nelson Pierre**	Lebanon, US	**Vancouver** (2025–present)			
Haiti	Carl Fred Sainté	Grand-Goâve, Haiti	Dallas (2024)			
Haiti	Brian Sylvestre	Hollywood, US	Philadelphia (2015)		Capped for the US men's national U20 soccer team	
Haiti	Patrick Tardieu	Haiti	New England (1996)			
Haiti	Sebastien Vorbe	Thomassin, Haiti	LA Galaxy (2000)			
Jamaica	Nicholas Addlery	Kingston, Jamaica	D.C. United (2007)			
Jamaica	Giles Barnes	Barking, England	Orlando (2017)	Houston (2012–16), Vancouver (2016–17)	Capped for England's national U19 football team	
Jamaica	**Jon Bell**	Rockville, US	**Austin** (2026–)	New England (2021–22), St. Louis (2023), Seattle (2024–25)		
Jamaica	Matthew Bell	May Pen, Jamaica	Salt Lake (2024)			
Jamaica	**Andre Blake**	Kingston, Jamaica	**Philadelphia** (2014–)			
Jamaica	Neco Brett	Kingston, Jamaica	Portland (2016)			
Jamaica	Brian Brown	Sandy Bay, Jamaica	Philadelphia (2014)			
Jamaica	Deshorn Brown	Manchester, Jamaica	D.C. United (2017)	Colorado (2013–15)		
Jamaica	Javain Brown	Kingston, Jamaica	Salt Lake (2024–25)	Vancouver (2021–24)		
Jamaica	Cory Burke	Kingston, Jamaica	New York Red Bulls (2023–24)	Philadelphia (2018–22)		
Jamaica	Altimont Butler	Kingston, Jamaica	Columbus (1997)	San Jose (1996)		
Jamaica	Sergio Campbell	Clarendon, Jamaica	Columbus (2015)			
Jamaica	Omar Cummings	Old Harbour, Jamaica	Houston (2013–14)	Colorado (2007–12)		
Jamaica	Rashawn Dally	Bloomfield, US	Cincinnati (2019–20)			
Jamaica	Chris Dawes	Kingston, Jamaica	Colorado (2001)			
Jamaica	Simon Dawkins	Edgware, England	San Jose (2011–12, 2016–17)			
Jamaica	Stephen DeRoux	Saint Mary, Jamaica	D.C. United (2006–07)			
Jamaica	Joey DeZart	Jackson, US	Orlando (2020–22)			
Jamaica	**Kyle Duncan**	New York City, US	**Minnesota** (2026–present)	New York Red Bulls (2018–21)	Capped for the US men's national, U18, U20 and U23 soccer teams	
Jamaica	Oniel Fisher	Portmore, Jamaica	Minnesota (2022)	Seattle (2015–17), D.C. United (2018–20), LA Galaxy (2021)		
Jamaica	Shaun Francis	Mandeville, Jamaica	Montreal (2017)	Columbus (2010–12), Chicago (2013), San Jose (2014–17)		
Jamaica	**Ian Fray**	Coconut Creek, US	**Inter Miami** (2023–present)			
Jamaica	**Tayvon Gray**	New York City, US	**New York City FC** (2021–present)		Capped for the US men's national U17 soccer team	
Jamaica	Brenton Griffiths	Spanish Town, Jamaica	Colorado (2013)			
Jamaica	Winston Griffiths	Saint Elizabeth Parish, Jamaica	New England (2002)	MetroStars (2002), LA Galaxy(2002)		
Jamaica	Wolde Harris	Kingston, Jamaica	Colorado (1997–99, 2005)	New England (2000–03), Kansas City (2003)		
Jamaica	**Jayden Hibbert**	Teaneck, US	**Atlanta** (2025–present)			
Jamaica	Omar Holness	Kingston, Jamaica	Salt Lake (2016–17)			
Jamaica	Jermaine Hue	Morant Bay, Jamaica	Kansas City (2005–06)			
Jamaica	Jason Johnson	Happy News, Jamaica	Chicago (2015)	Houston (2013–15)		
Jamaica	Ryan Johnson	Kingston, Jamaica	Portland (2013)	Salt Lake (2006), Chicago (2006), San Jose (2008–11), Toronto (2011–12)		
Jamaica	Dane Kelly	Saint Catherine Parish, Jamaica	D.C. United (2018)			
Jamaica	Kevon Lambert	Clarendon Parish, Jamaica	Salt Lake (2023)			
Jamaica	Kemar Lawrence	Kingston, Jamaica	Minnesota (2022–23)	New York Red Bulls (2015–22), Toronto (2021–22)		
Jamaica	Damion Lowe	Kingston, Jamaica	Philadelphia (2023–24)	Inter Miami (2022)		
Jamaica	Onandi Lowe	Kingston, Jamaica	Kansas City (2001)			
Jamaica	Tyrone Marshall	Kingston, Jamaica	Colorado, Miami Fusion, LA Galaxy, Toronto, Seattle (1998–2012)			
Jamaica	Darren Mattocks	Portmore, Jamaica	Cincinnati (2019)	Vancouver (2012–16), Portland (2016–17), D.C. United (2018)		
Jamaica	Justin McMaster	Atlanta, US	Minnesota (2021)			
Jamaica	Ravel Morrison	Wythenshawe, England	D.C. United (2022)		Capped for England's national U16, U17, U18 and U21 football teams	
Jamaica	Lovel Palmer	Mandeville, Jamaica	Chicago (2014–15)	Houston (2010–11), Portland (2011–12), Salt Lake (2013)		
Jamaica	Demar Phillips	Kingston, Jamaica	Salt Lake (2015–18)			
Jamaica	**Alvas Powell**	Danvers Pen, Jamaica	**Cincinnati** (2019, 2022–present)	Portland (2013–18), Inter Miami (2020), Philadelphia (2021)		
Jamaica	Darryl Powell	Lambeth, England	Colorado (2003–04)			
Jamaica	Damani Ralph	Kingston, Jamaica	Chicago (2003–04)			
Jamaica	**Seymour Reid**	Kingston, Jamaica	**Kansas City** (2026–present)	New York City FC (2025–26)		
Jamaica	Dane Richards	Montego Bay, Jamaica	New York Red Bulls (2007–12, 2015)	Vancouver (2012)		
Jamaica	Donovan Ricketts	Montego Bay, Jamaica	LA Galaxy (2009–11, 2015)	Montreal (2012), Portland (2012–14), Orlando (2015|		
Jamaica	Robert Scarlett	Kingston, Jamaica	Salt Lake (2005)			
Jamaica	Tarik Scott	New York City, New York	Dallas (2024–25)			
Jamaica	Michael Seaton	Spanish Town, Jamaica	D.C. United (2013–14)			
Jamaica	Greg Simmonds	Kingston, Jamaica	Miami Fusion (2001)			
Jamaica	**Nicholas Simmonds**	Midlothian, US	**Dallas** (2026–present)			
Jamaica	Khari Stephenson	Kingston, Jamaica	San Jose (2010–12, 2014–15)	Kansas City (2004–05), Salt Lake (2013)		
Jamaica	Fabian Taylor	Kingston, Jamaica	MetroStars (2004)			
Jamaica	Jermaine Taylor	Portland, Jamaica	Minnesota (2017)	Houston (2011–15), Portland (2016)		
Jamaica	Roger Thomas	Jamaica	Miami Fusion (1998)			
Jamaica	Shavar Thomas	Kingston, Jamaica	Montreal (2012)	Dallas (2003), Kansas City (2004–06, 2010–11), Chivas USA (2007–09), Philadelphia (2010)		
Jamaica	Peter-Lee Vassell	St. James, Jamaica	Los Angeles FC (2019)			
Jamaica	Je-Vaughn Watson	Saint Catherine Parish, Jamaica	New England (2016–17)	Houston (2011–12), Dallas (2013–15)		
Jamaica	O'Brian White	Ocho Rios, Jamaica	Seattle (2011–12)	Toronto (2009–10)		
Jamaica	Andy Williams	Toronto, Canada	Salt Lake (2005–11)	Columbus (1998–99), Miami Fusion (2000), New England (2001–02), MetroStars (2002), Chicago (2003–04)		
Jamaica	Dicoy Williams	Kingston, Jamaica	Toronto (2011–12)			
Jamaica	Romario Williams	Portmore, Jamaica	Columbus (2019)	Montreal (2015–16), Atlanta (2017–19)		
Jamaica	Paul Young	Saint Catherine Parish, Jamaica	Tampa Bay (1998)	Columbus (1996)		
Jamaica	Craig Ziadie	Pembroke Pines, US	MetroStars (2002–04)	D.C. United (2001–02)		
Martinique	Jordy Delem	Le François, Martinique	Seattle (2017–21)			
Martinique	Harry Novillo	Lyon, France	Montreal (2019)		Capped for France's national U17 and U19 football teams	
Martinique	Frédéric Piquionne	Nouméa, France	Portland (2013–14)		Capped for France's national and national B football teams	
Puerto Rico	Isaac Angking	Providence, US	New England (2018)		Capped for the US men's national U17 and U20 soccer teams	
Puerto Rico	Cristian Arrieta	Orlando, US	Philadelphia (2010)			
Puerto Rico	Shawn Barry	Miramar, US	Salt Lake (2018)			
Puerto Rico	Terry Boss	Philomath, US	Seattle (2010)			
Puerto Rico	Bill Gaudette	Hummelstown, US	New York Red Bulls (2012)	Columbus (2005–07), LA Galaxy (2012)		
Puerto Rico	Jeremy Hall	Tampa, US	New England (2015)	New York Red Bulls (2009–10), Portland (2011), Dallas (2011), Toronto (2012–14)	Capped for the US men's national U17 and U18 soccer teams	
Puerto Rico	Jason Hernandez	New York City, US	Toronto (2017–18)	MetroStars (2005), Chivas USA (2006–07), San Jose (2008–14), New York City FC (2015–16)		
Puerto Rico	Tom Lips		New England (1996)			
Puerto Rico	Chris Megaloudis	Astoria, US	New York Red Bulls (2008)			
Puerto Rico	Manolo Sanchez	Philadelphia, US	New York Red Bulls (2015)			
Puerto Rico	Josh Saunders	Grants Pass, US	New York City FC (2014–16)	LA Galaxy (2005–06, 2009–12), Salt Lake (2013)	Capped for the US men's national U23 soccer team	
Puerto Rico	Zarek Valentin	Lancaster, US	Minnesota (2023–24)	Chivas USA (2011), Montreal (2012–13), Portland (2016–19), Houston (2020–22)	Capped for the US men's national U20 and U23 soccer teams	
Puerto Rico	Marco Vélez	Carolina, Puerto Rico	Toronto (2008–09)			
Puerto Rico	Petter Villegas	Esmeraldes, Ecuador	D.C. United (2002–03)	MetroStars (1996, 1999–2002)		
Saint Kitts and Nevis	Ethan Bristow	Maidenhead, England	Minnesota (2023)			
Saint Kitts and Nevis	Atiba Harris	Basseterre, Saint Kitts and Nevis	San Jose (2014)	Salt Lake (2006–07)	Chivas USA (2008–09), Dallas (2009–10), Vancouver (2011–12), Colorado (2013)	
Saint Lucia	**Donavan Phillip**	Castries, Saint Lucia	**Colorado** (2026–present)			
Saint Vincent and the Grenadines	Oalex Anderson	Barrouallie, Saint Vincent and the Grenadines	Seattle (2016)			
Saint Vincent and the Grenadines	Ezra Hendrickson	Barrouallie, Saint Vincent and the Grenadines	Columbus (2019–21)	MetroStars (1997), LA Galaxy (1997–03), Dallas (2003), D.C. United (2004), Chivas USA (2005–2006)		
Suriname	Roland Alberg	Hoorn, Netherlands	Philadelphia (2016–17)		Capped for the Netherlands' national U19 and U20 football teams	
Suriname	Kelvin Leerdam	Paramaribo, Suriname	LA Galaxy (2022–23)	Seattle (2017–20), Inter Miami (2021)	Capped for the Netherlands' national U19 and U21 football teams	
Trinidad and Tobago	Kevin Adams		Columbus (2001)			
Trinidad and Tobago	Chris Birchall	Stafford, England	Columbus (2012)	LA Galaxy (2009–11)		
Trinidad and Tobago	Cordell Cato	Carenage, Trinidad and Tobago	San Jose (2013–17)	Seattle (2012)		
Trinidad and Tobago	Daneil Cyrus	Plymouth Trinidad and Tobago	Chicago (2015)	Kansas City (2011)		
Trinidad and Tobago	Keon Daniel	Lambeau, Trinidad and Tobago	Philadelphia (2011–13)			
Trinidad and Tobago	Aubrey David	Georgetown, Guyana	Dallas (2016)		Capped for the Guyana national football team	
Trinidad and Tobago	Craig Demmin	Arima, Trinidad and Tobago	Tampa Bay (2001)			
Trinidad and Tobago	Ancil Elcock	Port of Spain, Trinidad and Tobago	Columbus (1997–2001)			
Trinidad and Tobago	Leslie Fitzpatrick	Port of Spain, Trinidad and Tobago	Salt Lake (2005)			
Trinidad and Tobago	**Ajani Fortune**	Raleigh, US	**Atlanta** (2023–present)			
Trinidad and Tobago	**Wayne Frederick**	Cabin John, US	**Colorado** (2024–present)			
Trinidad and Tobago	Kevan George	Roxborough, Trinidad and Tobago	Columbus (2012–15)			
Trinidad and Tobago	Gary Glasgow	Arima, Trinidad and Tobago	Kansas City (2000–02)			
Trinidad and Tobago	Cornell Glen	Port of Spain, Trinidad and Tobago	San Jose (2009–10)	MetroStars (2004), Columbus (2005), Colorado (2006), LA Galaxy (2006)		
Trinidad and Tobago	Jacob Greene	Crofton, US	D.C. United (2023)		Capped for the US men's national U20 soccer team	
Trinidad and Tobago	Brian Haynes	Couva, Trinidad and Tobago	Dallas (1996–2000)			
Trinidad and Tobago	**Kobi Henry**	Lakeland, US	**Salt Lake** (2025–present)		Capped for the US men's national U17 and U20 soccer teams	
Trinidad and Tobago	Shaka Hislop	Hackney, England	Dallas (2006–07)		Capped for England's U21 football team	
Trinidad and Tobago	Justin Hoyte	Leytonstone, England	Cincinnati (2019)		Capped for England's U16, U19, U20 and U21 football teams	
Trinidad and Tobago	Julius James	Maloney Gardens, Trinidad and Tobago	Columbus (2011–12)	Toronto (2008), Houston (2009), D.C. United (2009–10)		
Trinidad and Tobago	Avery John	Point Fortin, Trinidad and Tobago	D.C. United (2009)	New England (2004–07)		
Trinidad and Tobago	Stern John	Tunapuna, Trinidad and Tobago	Columbus (1998–99)			
Trinidad and Tobago	Joevin Jones	Carenage, Trinidad and Tobago	Inter Miami (2021–22)	Chicago (2015), Seattle (2016–17)		
Trinidad and Tobago	Kenwyne Jones	Point Fortin, Trinidad and Tobago	Atlanta (2017)			
Trinidad and Tobago	Darin Lewis	Tunapuna, Trinidad and Tobago	MetroStars (2002)			
Trinidad and Tobago	Yohance Marshall	Diego Martin, Trinidad and Tobago	LA Galaxy (2010)			
Trinidad and Tobago	Carlyle Mitchell	Arima, Trinidad and Tobago	Vancouver (2011–14)			
Trinidad and Tobago	**Roald Mitchell**	Montclair	**New York Red Bulls** (2024, 2026–present)			
Trinidad and Tobago	Kevin Molino	Carenage, Trinidad and Tobago	Columbus (2021–23)	Orlando (2011–16), Minnesota (2017–20)		
Trinidad and Tobago	Travis Mulraine	Laventille, Trinidad and Tobago	San Jose (2000)			
Trinidad and Tobago	David Nakhid	Port of Spain, Trinidad and Tobago	New England (1998)			
Trinidad and Tobago	Noah Powder	Edison, US	Salt Lake (2021)			
Trinidad and Tobago	Greg Ranjitsingh	Scarborough, Canada	Toronto (2023)	Orlando (2019), Minnesota (2020)		
Trinidad and Tobago	Marlon Rojas	Arima, Trinidad and Tobago	Salt Lake (2005)			
Trinidad and Tobago	Collin Samuel	Manzanilla, Trinidad and Tobago	Toronto (2007–08)			
Trinidad and Tobago	**Dante Sealy**	New York City, US	**Montréal** (2025–present)	Dallas (2019–24), Colorado (2026)	Capped for the US men's national U16, U17 and U20 soccer teams	
Trinidad and Tobago	Scott Sealy	Chaguanas, Trinidad and Tobago	Dallas (2012)	Kansas City (2005–2008), San Jose (2008)		
Trinidad and Tobago	Luke Singh	Brampton, Canada	Toronto (2021)			
Trinidad and Tobago	**Tyrese Spicer**	Trincity, Trinidad and Tobago	**Orlando** (2025–present)	Toronto, (2024–25)		
Trinidad and Tobago	Barry Swift	Port of Spain, Trinidad and Tobago	MetroStars (1998)			
Trinidad and Tobago	Osei Telesford	San Juan, Trinidad and Tobago	Chicago (2007)			
Trinidad and Tobago	Ryan Telfer	Mississauga, Canada	Toronto (2018–19)			
Trinidad and Tobago	Keyeno Thomas	Point Fortin, Trinidad and Tobago	Colorado (2000)			
Trinidad and Tobago	Sheldon Thomas	Trinidad and Tobago	LA Galaxy (2000)			
Trinidad and Tobago	Rick Titus	Mississauga, Canada	Toronto (2008)	Colorado (2002)		
Trinidad and Tobago	Mickey Trotman	Port of Spain, Trinidad and Tobago	Miami Fusion (1999)	Dallas (1998)		
Trinidad and Tobago	Nick Walker	Port of Spain, Trinidad and Tobago	Dallas (2014)			
Trinidad and Tobago	Mekeil Williams	Port of Spain, Trinidad and Tobago	Colorado (2016–17)			
Trinidad and Tobago	Evans Wise	Port of Spain, Trinidad and Tobago	New England (1997–98)	Tampa Bay (1996–97)		
Trinidad and Tobago	Steffen Yeates	Toronto, Canada	Toronto (2022)		Capped for Canada's national U17 and U20 soccer teams	
Turks and Caicos Islands	Gavin Glinton	Grand Turk, Turks and Caicos	San Jose (2008)	LA Galaxy (2002–03), Dallas (2003)		

=== Central American Zone ===
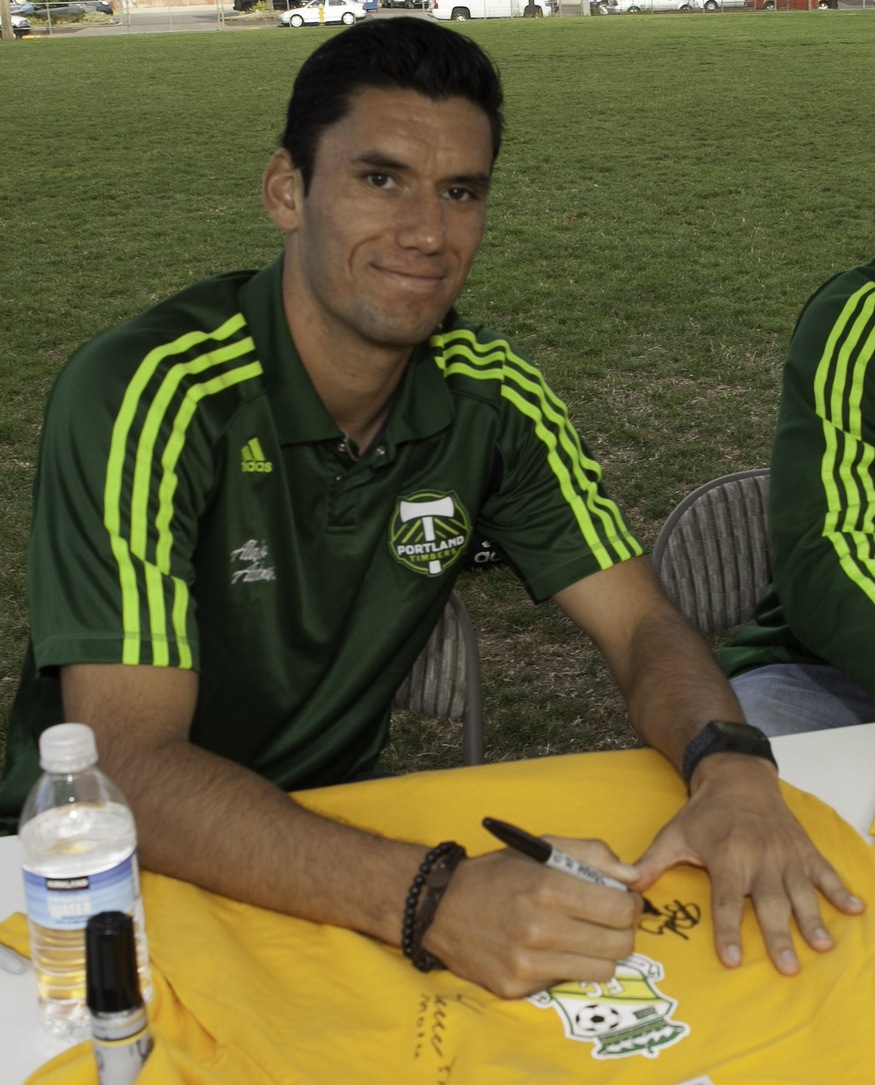
Steve Purdy

Country	Name	Birthplace	Most recent MLS team	Former MLS team(s)	Notes	Refs
Belize	Tony Rocha	Spring, US	New York City FC (2019–21)	Orlando (2016–18)		
Belize	Michael Salazar	New York City, US	Houston (2019–20)	Montreal (2016–17)		
Costa Rica	Jairo Arrieta	Nicoya, Costa Rica	D.C. United (2015)	Columbus (2012–14)		
Costa Rica	Gabriel Badilla	San José, Costa Rica	New England (2008)			
Costa Rica	Christian Bolaños	Hatillo, Costa Rica	Vancouver (2016–17)			
Costa Rica	Jonathan Bolaños	San José, Costa Rica	Chicago (2003)			
Costa Rica	Alejandro Bran	San José, Costa Rica	Minnesota (2024)			
Costa Rica	Pablo Brenes	Costa Rica	MetroStars (2004)			
Costa Rica	Keyner Brown	Puerto Limón, Costa Rica	Houston (2016)			
Costa Rica	Francisco Calvo	San José, Costa Rica	San Jose (2022)	Minnesota (2017–19), Chicago (2019–21)		
Costa Rica	Diego Campos	San José, Costa Rica	Chicago (2018–19)			
Costa Rica	Julio Cascante	Puerto Limón, Costa Rica	Austin (2021–25)	Portland (2018–2020)		
Costa Rica	Dennis Castillo	Desamparados, Costa Rica	Colorado (2016–17)			
Costa Rica	Pablo Chinchilla	Escazú, Costa Rica	LA Galaxy (2005)			
Costa Rica	Allan Cruz	Nicoya, Costa Rica	Cincinnati (2019–22)			
Costa Rica	Darío Delgado	Costa Rica	Chivas USA (2010)			
Costa Rica	Luis Díaz	Nicoya, Costa Rica	New England (2025)	Columbus (2019–23), Colorado (2023)		
Costa Rica	Argenis Fernández	Ciudad Neily, Costa Rica	New England (2008)			
Costa Rica	Waylon Francis	Puerto Limón, Costa Rica	Seattle (2018)	Columbus (2014, 2019–21)		
Costa Rica	Giancarlo González	Desamparados, Costa Rica	LA Galaxy (2019–20)	Columbus (2014)		
Costa Rica	Leonardo González	San José, Costa Rica	Seattle (2009–15)			
Costa Rica	David Guzmán	San José, Costa Rica	Columbus (2019)	Portland (2017–19)		
Costa Rica	Denis Hamlett	Puerto Limón, Costa Rica	Colorado (1996)			
Costa Rica	Andy Herron	Puerto Limón, Costa Rica	Chicago (2004–06, 2008)	Columbus (2007)		
Costa Rica	Carlos Johnson	Cartago, Costa Rica	New York Red Bulls (2009)			
Costa Rica	**Ariel Lassiter**	Turrialba, Costa Rica	**Portland**(2025–present)	LA Galaxy (2015–18), Houston (2020–21), Inter Miami (2022–23), Montréal (2023–24), Chicago (2024)	Capped for the US men's national U23 soccer team	
Costa Rica	Randall Leal	San José, Costa Rica	D.C. United (2025)	Nashville (2020–24)		
Costa Rica	José Leitón	Moravia, Costa Rica	Minnesota (2017)			
Costa Rica	Porfirio López	San José, Costa Rica	Philadelphia (2012)			
Costa Rica	Marvin Loría	San José, Costa Rica	Portland (2019–24)			
Costa Rica	José Macotelo	San José, Costa Rica	Chivas USA (2010)			
Costa Rica	**Warren Madrigal**	San José, Costa Rica	**Nashville** (2026–present)			
Costa Rica	**Alonso Martínez**	Puntarenas, Costa Rica	**New York City FC** (2023–present)			
Costa Rica	Josué Martínez	San José, Costa Rica	New York Red Bulls (2013)	Philadelphia (2012)		
Costa Rica	Rónald Matarrita	Alajuela, Costa Rica	Cincinnati (2021–22)	New York City FC (2016–20)		
Costa Rica	Roy Miller	Puerto Limón, Costa Rica	Portland (2017–18)	New York Red Bulls (2010–15)		
Costa Rica	Joseph Mora	Carrizal, Costa Rica	Charlotte (2022–23)	D.C. United (2018–21)		
Costa Rica	Kurt Morsink	Orlando, US	D.C. United (2010–12)	Kansas City (2007–09)		
Costa Rica	Roy Myers	La Francia de Siquirres, Costa Rica	LA Galaxy (1999–00)	MetroStars (2000, 2001)		
Costa Rica	David Myrie	Puerto Viejo, Costa Rica	Philadelphia (2010)			
Costa Rica	José Guillermo Ortiz	Uruca, Costa Rica	D.C. United (2017)			
Costa Rica	Bryan Oviedo	San José, Costa Rica	Salt Lake (2022–24)			
Costa Rica	Damian Rivera	Cranston, US	New England (2021–23)		Capped for the US men's national U17 soccer team	
Costa Rica	**Andy Rojas**	Grecia, Costa Rica	**New York Red Bulls** (2026–present)			
Costa Rica	Álvaro Saborío	Ciudad Quesada, Costa Rica	D.C. United (2015–16)	Salt Lake (2010–15)		
Costa Rica	Álvaro Sánchez	Ciudad Quesada, Costa Rica	Dallas (2009)			
Costa Rica	Erick Scott	Puerto Limón, Costa Rica	Columbus (2004)			
Costa Rica	Gonzalo Segares	San José, Costa Rica	Chicago (2005–14)			
Costa Rica	Ulises Segura	Guadalupe, Costa Rica	D.C. United (2018–20)			
Costa Rica	Alejandro Sequeira	San José, Costa Rica	San Jose (1999)	Tampa Bay (1999)		
Costa Rica	Douglas Sequeira	San José, Costa Rica	Salt Lake (2006)	Chivas USA (2005)		
Costa Rica	Jordan Smith	San José, Costa Rica	Vancouver (2015–16)			
Costa Rica	Mauricio Solís	Heredia, Costa Rica	San Jose (1999–2000)			
Costa Rica	Jafet Soto	San José, Costa Rica	Salt Lake (2006)			
Costa Rica	William Sunsing	Heredia, Costa Rica	New England (2000–01)			
Costa Rica	Daniel Torres	Moravia, Costa Rica	Dallas (2009)	Columbus (2001–03), Salt Lake (2006–07)		
Costa Rica	Michael Umaña	Santa Ana, Costa Rica	Chivas USA (2010–11)	LA Galaxy (2005)		
Costa Rica	Marco Ureña	San José, Costa Rica	Los Angeles FC (2018)	San Jose (2017)		
Costa Rica	Olman Vargas	San José, Costa Rica	Columbus (2012)			
Costa Rica	Johan Venegas	Puerto Limón, Costa Rica	Minnesota (2017–18)	Montreal (2015–16)		
Costa Rica	Gino Vivi	San José, Costa Rica	LA Galaxy (2023)			
Costa Rica	Rodney Wallace	San José, Costa Rica	Kansas City (2019)	D.C. United (2009–10), Portland (2011–15), New York City FC (2017–18)		
Costa Rica	Paulo Wanchope	Heredia, Costa Rica	Chicago (2007)			
Costa Rica	Kendall Waston	San José, Costa Rica	Cincinnati (2019–20)	Vancouver (2014–18)		
Costa Rica	Mauricio Wright	San José, Costa Rica	New England (2000–01)	San Jose (1999–00)		
El Salvador	Jaime Alas	San Salvador, El Salvador	San Jose (2013)			
El Salvador	Arturo Álvarez	Houston, US	Houston (2018)	San Jose (2003–04, 2008–10), Dallas (2005–08), Salt Lake (2011), Chicago (2016–17)	Capped for the US men's national U17, U18, U20 and U23 soccer teams	
El Salvador	Junior Burgos	Santa Ana, El Salvador	Toronto (2012)			
El Salvador	Eric Calvillo	Palmdale, US	San Jose (2018–20)		Capped for the US men's national U17 and U19 soccer teams	
El Salvador	Christian Castillo	San Salvador, El Salvador	D.C. United (2010)			
El Salvador	Darwin Cerén	Quezaltepeque, El Salvador	Houston (2018–22)	Orlando (2014–16), San Jose (2016–17)		
El Salvador	Ronald Cerritos	San Salvador, El Salvador	Houston (2006)	San Jose (1997–01, 2005), Dallas (2002–03), D.C. United (2003–04)		
El Salvador	Mauricio Cienfuegos	San Salvador, El Salvador	LA Galaxy (1996–2003)			
El Salvador	Raúl Díaz Arce	San Rafael Obrajuelo, El Salvador	Colorado (2001)	D.C. United (1996–1997, 2000–01), New England (1998), San Jose (1999), Tampa Bay (1999–00)		
El Salvador	Andrés Flores	San Salvador, El Salvador	Portland (2018–20)			
El Salvador	Jeremy Garay	Woodbridge, US	D.C. United (2024)		Capped for the US men's national U20 soccer team	
El Salvador	Marvin Iraheta	Sensuntepeque, El Salvador	Chivas USA (2013)			
El Salvador	Julio Martínez	Coatepeque, El Salvador	Chicago (2010)			
El Salvador	Gerson Mayen	Los Angeles, US	Chivas USA (2009–11)		Capped for the US men's national U20 soccer team	
El Salvador	Amando Moreno	Perth Amboy, US	Chicago (2019)	New York Red Bulls (2013)	Capped for the US men's national U18 and U20 soccer teams	
El Salvador	**Nathan Ordaz**	Van Nuys, US	**Los Angeles FC** (2023–present)			
El Salvador	**Harold Osorio**	San Salvador, El Salvador	**Chicago** (2025–present)			
El Salvador	Alfredo Pacheco	Santa Ana, El Salvador	New York Red Bulls (2009)			
El Salvador	Joshua Pérez	Montebello, US	Los Angeles FC (2018–19)		Capped for the US men's national U15, U17, U19, U20 and U23 soccer teams	
El Salvador	Steve Purdy	Bakersfield, US	Chivas USA (2013)	Dallas (2009), Portland (2011–12)	Capped for the US men's national U17, U20 and U23 soccer teams	
El Salvador	Marvin Quijano	San Salvador, El Salvador	Colorado (2002–03)	LA Galaxy (1999–01)		
El Salvador	Eliseo Quintanilla	Santa Tecla, El Salvador	D.C. United (2002–03)			
El Salvador	Jorge Rodríguez	San Alejo, El Salvador	Dallas (1997–2002)			
El Salvador	**Alex Roldan**	Artesia, US	**Seattle** (2018–present)			
El Salvador	Osael Romero	Usulután, El Salvador	Chivas USA (2010)			
El Salvador	**Tomas Romero**	Cherry Hill, US	**New York City FC** (2025–present)	Los Angeles FC (2021), Toronto (2023)		
El Salvador	Ramón Sánchez	San Juan Opico, El Salvador	San Jose (2009–10)			
El Salvador	Deris Umanzor	Santa Rosa de Lima, El Salvador	Chicago (2010)			
El Salvador	Eriq Zavaleta	Westfield, US	LA Galaxy (2022–25)	Seattle (2013–14), Chivas USA (2014), Toronto (2015–21)	Capped for the US men's national U17	
El Salvador	Rodolfo Zelaya	Usulután, El Salvador	Los Angeles FC (2019)			
Guatemala	Gustavo Cabrera	Santo Tomás, Guatemala	Salt Lake (2005)			
Guatemala	**Olger Escobar**	Lynn, US	**Montréal** (2025–present)			
Guatemala	**Matt Evans**	Simi Valley, US	**Los Angeles FC** (2026–present)		Capped for the US men's national U17 soccer team	
Guatemala	Freddy García	Puerto Barrios, Guatemala	Columbus (2002–03)			
Guatemala	**Nicholas Hagen**	Guatemala City, Guatemala	**Columbus** (2024–present)			
Guatemala	Moises Hernandez	Dallas, US	Dallas (2014–15)		Capped for the US men's national U20 soccer team	
Guatemala	Aaron Herrera	Las Cruces, US	D.C. United (2024–26)	Salt Lake (2018–22), Montréal (2022–23)	Capped for the US men's national, U20 and U23 soccer teams	
Guatemala	Martín Machón	Santa Catarina Pinula, Guatemala	Miami Fusion (2000)	LA Galaxy (1997–98)		
Guatemala	Arquimides Ordóñez	Cincinnati, US	Cincinnati (2021–23)			
Guatemala	Marco Pappa	Guatemala City, Guatemala	Colorado (2016)	Chicago (2008–12), Seattle (2014–15)		
Guatemala	Guillermo Ramírez	Livingston, Guatemala	LA Galaxy (2005)			
Guatemala	Jorge Rodas	Jalapa, Guatemala	San Jose (1996)			
Guatemala	Mario Rodríguez	Guatemala City, Guatemala	Columbus (2005)			
Guatemala	Rubio Rubin	Beaverton, US	Salt Lake (2021–23)		Capped for the US men's national, U17, U20 and U23 soccer teams	
Guatemala	Carlos Ruiz	Guatemala City, Guatemala	Dallas (2005–07, 2016)	LA Galaxy (2002–04), Toronto (2008), Philadelphia (2011), D.C. United (2013)		
Guatemala	Rodrigo Saravia	Guatemala City, Guatemala	Columbus (2016)			
Guatemala	Willie Sims	Guatemala City, Guatemala	New England (2006)			
Guatemala	Jonathan Top	Fort Worth, US	Dallas (2012)		Capped for the US men's national U20 soccer team	
Guatemala	Elías Vásquez	Guatemala City, Guatemala	Salt Lake (2015)			
Honduras	**Bryan Acosta**	La Ceiba, Honduras	**Nashville** (2025–present)	Dallas (2019–21), Colorado (2022–23), Portland (2023)		
Honduras	Danilo Acosta	San Pedro Sula, Honduras	LA Galaxy (2021)	Salt Lake (2016–19), Orlando (2019)	Capped for the US men's national U20 soccer team	
Honduras	Éver Alvarado	El Negrito, Honduras	Kansas City (2016)			
Honduras	Kervin Arriaga	Puerto Cortés, Honduras	Minnesota (2022–24)			
Honduras	Jesús Batiz	Tela, Honduras	Toronto (2023)			
Honduras	Brayan Beckeles	La Ceiba, Honduras	Nashville (2020)			
Honduras	Jerry Bengtson	Santa Rosa de Aguán, Honduras	New England (2012–14)			
Honduras	Víctor Bernárdez	La Ceiba, Honduras	San Jose (2012–17)			
Honduras	Samuel Caballero	Puerto Lempira, Honduras	Chicago (2005)			
Honduras	Mauricio Castro	Tegucigalpa, Honduras	New England (2008–09)			
Honduras	Marvin Chávez	La Ceiba, Honduras	Chivas USA (2014)	Dallas (2009–11), San Jose (2012–13), Colorado (2014)		
Honduras	Michaell Chirinos	Tegucigalpa, Honduras	Vancouver (2019)			
Honduras	Jorge Claros	La Ceiba, Honduras	Kansas City (2014)			
Honduras	Carlo Costly	San Pedro Sula, Honduras	Houston (2011)			
Honduras	Arnold Cruz	El Progreso, Honduras	San Jose (1997)	D.C. United (1997)		
Honduras	Alberth Elis	San Pedro Sula, Honduras	Houston (2017–20)			
Honduras	José Escalante	Tegucigalpa, Honduras	Houston (2016–17)			
Honduras	Roger Espinoza	Puerto Cortés, Honduras	Kansas City (2008–12, 2015–23)			
Honduras	Maynor Figueroa	Jutiapa, Honduras	Houston (2019–21)	Colorado (2015), Dallas (2016–18)		
Honduras	Deybi Flores	San Pedro Sula, Honduras	Toronto (2024–25)	Vancouver (2015–16)		
Honduras	Boniek García	Tegucigalpa, Honduras	Houston (2012–21)			
Honduras	Luis Garrido	Juticalpa, Honduras	Houston (2014–15)			
Honduras	Iván Guerrero	Comayagua, Honduras	D.C. United (2009)	Chicago (2005–07), San Jose (2008)		
Honduras	Amado Guevara	Tegucigalpa, Honduras	Toronto (2008–09)	New York Red Bulls (2003–06), Chivas USA (2007–08)		
Honduras	Johnny Leverón	Yoro, Honduras	Vancouver (2013–14)			
Honduras	Alexander López	Tegucigalpa, Honduras	Houston (2013–15)			
Honduras	Luis López Fernández	San Pedro Sula, Honduras	Los Angeles FC (2018)			
Honduras	Denil Maldonado	Tegucigalpa, Honduras	Los Angeles FC (2023)			
Honduras	Douglas Martínez	Olanchito, Honduras	Salt Lake (2019–21)			
Honduras	Mario Martínez	San Pedro Sula, Honduras	Seattle (2012–13)			
Honduras	Saúl Martínez	Colón, Honduras	Miami Fusion (1999)			
Honduras	Walter Martínez	Tegucigalpa, Honduras	San Jose (2013)			
Honduras	**Andy Najar**	Choluteca, Honduras	**Nashville** (2025–present)	D.C. United (2010–13, 2021–23), Los Angeles FC (2020)		
Honduras	Ramón Núñez	Tegucigalpa, Honduras	Dallas, Chivas USA (2004–07, 2013)			
Honduras	Carlos Pavón	El Progreso, Honduras	LA Galaxy (2007)			
Honduras	Alex Pineda Chacón	Santa Cruz de Yojoa, Honduras	Columbus (2003)	Miami Fusion (2001), New England (2002), LA Galaxy (2003)		
Honduras	Romell Quioto	Balfate, Honduras	Montreal (2020–23)	Houston (2017–19)		
Honduras	Milton Reyes	Arenal, Honduras	Dallas (2004)	D.C. United (2002)		
Honduras	Bryan Róchez	Tegucigalpa, Honduras	Orlando (2015)			
Honduras	**Joseph Rosales**	Tegucigalpa	**Austin** (2026–present)	Minnesota (2021–22, 2023–25)		
Honduras	**David Ruiz**	Miami, US	**New York Red Bulls** (2026–present)	Inter Miami (2023–26)		
Honduras	Hendry Thomas	La Ceiba, Honduras	Dallas (2014)	Colorado (2012–13)		
Honduras	Alenis Vargas	San Pedro Sula, Honduras	Kansas City (2024)			
Panama	Roberto Brown	Panama City, Panama	Colorado (2007)			
Panama	Omar Browne	Panama City, Panama	Montreal (2019)			
Panama	Miguel Camargo	Panama City, Panama	New York City FC (2017)			
Panama	Adalberto Carrasquilla	Panama City, Panama	Houston (2021–24)			
Panama	Armando Cooper	Colón, Panama	Toronto (2016–17)			
Panama	Harold Cummings	Panama City, Panama	San Jose (2018–19)			
Panama	Eric Davis	Colón, Panama	D.C. United (2023)			
Panama	Jorge Dely Valdés	Colón, Panama	Colorado (1999–2000)			
Panama	Fidel Escobar	Panama City, Panama	New York Red Bulls (2017–18)			
Panama	Rolando Escobar	Panama City, Panama	Dallas (2015)			
Panama	José Fajardo	Colón, Panama	D.C. United (2023)			
Panama	**Aníbal Godoy**	Panama City, Panama	**San Diego** (2025–present)	San Jose (2015–19), Nashville (2020–24)		
Panama	Gabriel Gómez	Panama City, Panama	Philadelphia (2012)			
Panama	Víctor Griffith	Panama City, Panama	Portland (2023)			
Panama	**Carlos Harvey**	Panama City, Panama	**Minnesota** (2024–present)	LA Galaxy (2020–22)		
Panama	**Mijahir Jiménez**		**New York Red Bulls** (2026–)			
Panama	Adolfo Machado	Panama City, Panama	Houston (2017–18)			
Panama	Cristian Martínez	Panama City, Panama	Chicago (2019)	Columbus (2016, 2017–18)		
Panama	**Rafael Mosquera**	Panama City, Panama	**New York Red Bulls** (2025–present)			
Panama	Michael Amir Murillo –	Panama City, Panama	New York Red Bulls (2017–19)			
Panama	Roberto Nurse	Cuernavaca, Mexico	Chivas USA (2008)			
Panama	Jaime Penedo	Panama City, Panama	LA Galaxy (2013–15)			
Panama	Blas Pérez	Panama City, Panama	Vancouver (2016)	Dallas (2012–15)		
Panama	Ricardo Phillips	Panama City, Panama	New England (2005)			
Panama	Alberto Quintero	Panama City, Panama	San Jose (2016)			
Panama	Carlos Rodríguez	Panama	Dallas (2012)			
Panama	Marcos Sánchez	Panama City, Panama	D.C. United (2013)			
Panama	Tony Taylor	Long Beach, US	New England, New York City FC (2014–16)		Capped for the US men's national U20 and U23 soccer teams	
Panama	Luis Tejada	Panama City, Panama	Salt Lake (2007)			
Panama	Gabriel Torres	Panama City, Panama	Colorado (2013–15)			
Panama	Román Torres	Panama City, Panama	Inter Miami (2020)	Seattle (2015–19)		
Panama	**Omar Valencia**	Panama City, Panama	**New York Red Bulls** (2024–present)			

=== North American Zone ===
Country	Name	Birthplace	Most recent MLS team	Former MLS team(s)	Notes	Refs
Mexico	José Manuel Abundis	Guadalajara, Mexico	New England (2006)			
Mexico	Alonso Aceves	Huixquilucan, Mexico	Chicago (2023)			
Mexico	Miguel Aguilar	Ciudad Juárez, Mexico	D.C. United (2015–16)			
Mexico	Oswaldo Alanís	Morelia, Mexico	San Jose (2020–21)			
Mexico	Tony Alfaro	Puruándiro, Mexico	LA Galaxy (2023)	Seattle (2016–18), D.C. United (2021–22), New York City FC (2022–23)		
Mexico	Cesar Alvarado	Mexico City, Mexico	Tampa Bay (1999)			
Mexico	Byron Alvarez	Mexico City, Mexico	MetroStars (2002)			
Mexico	Damián Álvarez	Veracruz, Mexico	New England (1998)	Dallas (1997)		
Mexico	Efraín Álvarez	Los Angeles, US	LA Galaxy (2019–23)		Capped for the US men's national U15 soccer teams	
Mexico	Uriel Antuna	Gómez Palacio, Mexico	LA Galaxy (2019)			
Mexico	**Matthew Arana**	Texas, US	**Houston** (2026–present)			
Mexico	Julián Araujo	Lompoc, US	LA Galaxy (2019–22)		Capped for the US men's national, U18, U19, U20 and U23 soccer teams	
Mexico	Rafael Baca	Tuxpan, Mexico	San Jose (2011–13)			
Mexico	Fidel Barajas	Sacramento, US	D.C. United (2025)	Salt Lake (2024)	Capped for the US men's national U17 soccer team	
Mexico	Adolfo Bautista	Dolores Hidalgo, Mexico	Chivas USA (2014)			
Mexico	Armando Begines	Guadalajara, Mexico	Chivas USA (2005)			
Mexico	**Germán Berterame**	Villa María, Argentina	**Inter Miami** (2026–present)		Capped for Argentina's national U17 football team	
Mexico	Cuauhtémoc Blanco	Mexico City, Mexico	Chicago (2007–09)			
Mexico	Omar Bravo	Los Mochis, Mexico	Kansas City (2011)			
Mexico	Jorge Campos	Acapulco, Mexico	Chicago (1998)	LA Galaxy (1996, 1997)		
Mexico	Omar Campos	Mexico City, Mexico	Los Angeles FC (2024)			
Mexico	Giovani Casillas	Guadalajara, Mexico	Chivas USA (2013)			
Mexico	Jorge Castañeda	Guadalajara, Mexico	Colorado (1997)			
Mexico	Nery Castillo	San Luis Potosí, Mexico	Chicago (2010)			
Mexico	Ronaldo Cisneros	Torreón, Mexico	Atlanta (2022)			
Mexico	Héctor Cuadros	Guadalajara, Mexico	Chivas USA (2005)			
Mexico	Jürgen Damm	Tuxpan, Mexico	Atlanta (2020–21)			
Mexico	Duilio Davino	León, Mexico	Dallas (2008)			
Mexico	Antonio de la Torre	Guadalajara, Mexico	Colorado (2004)			
Mexico	Mario de Luna	Aguascalientes, Mexico	Chivas USA (2013)			
Mexico	Giovani dos Santos	Mexico City, Mexico	LA Galaxy (2015–18)			
Mexico	Jonathan dos Santos	Mexico City, Mexico	LA Galaxy (2017–21)			
Mexico	Missael Espinoza	Tepic, Mexico	San Jose (1996)			
Mexico	Rodolfo Espinoza	Guasave, Mexico	Chivas USA (2010)			
Mexico	Marco Fabián	Guadalajara, Mexico	Philadelphia (2019)			
Mexico	Carlos Fierro	Ahome, Mexico	San Jose (2019–21)			
Mexico	Vicente Figueroa	Guadalajara, Mexico	Kansas City (1999–00)	San Jose (1998)		
Mexico	Guillermo Franco	Corrientes, Argentina	Chicago (2012)			
Mexico	Johnny García	Guadalajara, Mexico	Chivas USA (2006)			
Mexico	Juan Pablo García	Guadalajara, Mexico	Chivas USA (2005–06)			
Mexico	Sergio García	Guadalajara, Mexico	Chivas USA (2005)			
Mexico	**Jonathan González**	Santa Rosa, US	**San Jose** (2026–present)	Minnesota (2022)		
Mexico	Raúl Gudiño	Guadalajara, Mexico	Atlanta (2022)			
Mexico	Aaron Guillen	Chihuahua, Mexico	Dallas (2016–17)			
Mexico	Brian Gutiérrez	Berwyn, US	Chicago (2020–25)		Capped for the US men's national, U16, U20 and U23 soccer teams	
Mexico	Daniel Guzmán	Guadalajara, Mexico	San Jose (1997)			
Mexico	Carlos Hermosillo	Cerro Azul, Mexico	LA Galaxy (1996–97)			
Mexico	Cristhian Hernández	Guadalajara, Mexico	Philadelphia (2012)			
Mexico	Javier Hernández	Guadalajara, Mexico	LA Galaxy (2020–23)			
Mexico	José Hernández	Ixtapan de la Sal, Mexico	Salt Lake (2017–18)			
Mexico	Luis Hernández	Poza Rica, Mexico	LA Galaxy (2000–01)			
Mexico	**Héctor Herrera**	Tijuana, Mexico	**Houston** (2022–24, 2026–)			
Mexico	Diego Jiménez	Tepatitlán, Mexico	New York Red Bulls (2008)			
Mexico	Efraín Juárez	Mexico City, Mexico	Vancouver (2018)			
Mexico	Luis Ángel Landín	Zamora, Mexico	Houston (2009–10)			
Mexico	Richard Ledezma	Phoenix, US	New York City FC (2023)		Capped for the US men's national, U20 and U23 soccer teams	
Mexico	Bryan Leyva	Chihuahua, Mexico	Dallas (2010, 2012)			
Mexico	Eduardo Lillingston	Guadalajara, Mexico	Chivas USA (2009)			
Mexico	Alfonso Loera	Ensenada, Mexico	Chivas USA (2005)			
Mexico	Aaron López	Mexico	Chivas USA (2005)			
Mexico	Javier Eduardo López	Torreón, Mexico	San Jose (2021–22)			
Mexico	**Hirving Lozano**	Mexico City, Mexico	**LA Galaxy** (2026–present)	San Diego (2025)		
Mexico	Rubén Luna	Ciudad Victoria, Mexico	Dallas (2010–12)			
Mexico	Rafael Márquez	Zamora, Mexico	New York Red Bulls (2010–12)			
Mexico	Antonio Martínez	Jalisco, Mexico	Chivas USA (2005)	Dallas (2000–03), LA Galaxy (2003)		
Mexico	Édgar Mejía	Guadalajara, Mexico	Chivas USA (2013)			
Mexico	Raúl Mendiola	Ciudad Juárez, Mexico	LA Galaxy (2014, 2016–17)			
Mexico	Francisco Mendoza	El Salto, Mexico	Chivas USA (2005–08, 2011)			
Mexico	Alán Montes	Hermosillo, Mexico	Kansas City (2025)			
Mexico	Jesús Morales	Uruapan, Mexico	Chivas USA (2006)			
Mexico	Santiago Muñoz	El Paso, US	Kansas City (2025)			
Mexico	David Ochoa	Oxnard, US	Los Angeles FC (2025)	Salt Lake (2020–22), D.C. United (2022)	Capped for the US men's national U18, U20 and U23 soccer teams	
Mexico	Jesús Ochoa	Villamar, Mexico	Chivas USA (2005)	LA Galaxy (2002–03)		
Mexico	**Jaziel Orozco**	Ciudad Juárez, Mexico	**St. Louis** (2025–present)	Salt Lake (2022)		
Mexico	Daniel Osorno	Guadalajara, Mexico	Colorado (2007)			
Mexico	Jesús Padilla	San Jose, US	Chivas USA (2009–10)			
Mexico	Francisco Palencia	Mexico City, Mexico	Chivas USA (2005–06)			
Mexico	Pável Pardo	Guadalajara, Mexico	Chicago (2011–12)			
Mexico	David Patiño	Mexico City, Mexico	Colorado (1997)			
Mexico	Jonathan Perez	Pico Rivera, US	Nashville (2025)	LA Galaxy (2021–25)	Capped for the US men's national U16 soccer team	
Mexico	Gonzalo Pineda	Pátzcuaro, Mexico	Seattle (2014–15)			
Mexico	Rodolfo Pizarro	Tampico, Mexico	Inter Miami (2020–21, 2023)			
Mexico	Martín Ponce	Celaya, Mexico	Chivas USA (2013)			
Mexico	Alan Pulido	Ciudad Victoria, Mexico	Kansas City (2020–21, 2023–24)			
Mexico	Juanjo Purata	San Luis Potosí, Mexico	Atlanta (2022–23)			
Mexico	Alonso Ramírez	Chiautempan, Mexico	Austin (2024)			
Mexico	Anthony Ramírez		Dallas (2024–25)			
Mexico	Ramón Ramírez	Tepic, Mexico	Chivas USA (2005)			
Mexico	José Retiz	Acapulco, Mexico	Columbus (2006)	LA Galaxy (2003)		
Mexico	**Daniel Ríos**	Miguel Hidalgo, Mexico	**Montréal** (2026–present)	Nashville (2019–22), Charlotte (2022), Atlanta (2024), Vancouver (2025)		
Mexico	José Manuel Rivera	Guadalajara, Mexico	Chivas USA (2013)			
Mexico	Alberto Rizo		Colorado (2003)			
Mexico	Edmundo Rodriguez	Guadalajara, Mexico	Kansas City (1997)	MetroStars (1996)		
Mexico	Abraham Romero	Pasadena, US	Columbus (2024)		Capped for the US men's national U15 soccer team	
Mexico	Isaac Romo	Guadalajara, Mexico	Chivas USA (2005)			
Mexico	**Jorge Ruvalcaba**	Rialto, US	**New York Red Bulls** (2026–present)			
Mexico	Carlos Salcedo	Guadalajara, Mexico	Toronto (2022)	Salt Lake (2013–14)		
Mexico	Hugo Sánchez	Mexico City, Mexico	Dallas (1996)			
Mexico	Richard Sánchez	Mission Hills, US	Kansas City (2020)	Chicago (2017–18)		
Mexico	**Pablo Sisniega**	Mexico City, Mexico	**San Diego** (2025–present)	Los Angeles FC (2019–21), Charlotte (2022–23)		
Mexico	Erasmo Solórzano	Los Fresnos, Mexico	Chivas USA (2007)			
Mexico	Claudio Suárez	Texcoco, Mexico	Chivas USA (2006–09)			
Mexico	Miguel Tapias	Hermosillo, Mexico	Minnesota (2023–24)			
Mexico	Christian Torres	Fontana, US	Los Angeles FC (2020, 2022)		Capped for the US men's national U15 soccer team	
Mexico	Erick Torres	Guadalajara, Mexico	Atlanta (2020–21)	Chivas USA (2013–14), Houston (2015–17)		
Mexico	Jairo Torres	Guadalajara, Mexico	Chicago (2022–23)			
Mexico	Danny Trejo	Morelia, Mexico	Los Angeles FC (2022)			
Mexico	Mariano Trujillo	Mexico City, Mexico	Chivas USA (2009–11)			
Mexico	Víctor Ulloa	Ciudad Juárez, Mexico	Inter Miami (2020–23)	Dallas (2011–18), Cincinnati (2019)		
Mexico	Francisco Uribe	Tehuacán, Mexico	San Jose (1998)			
Mexico	Josecarlos Van Rankin	Mexico City, Mexico	Portland (2021–22)			
Mexico	Obed Vargas	Anchorage, US	Seattle (2021–25)		Capped for the US men's national U20 and U23 soccer teams	
Mexico	Carlos Vela	Cancún, Mexico	Los Angeles FC (2018–23)			
Mexico	Joaquín Velázquez	Veracruz, Mexico	Chivas USA (2013)			
Mexico	Adrian Zendejas	Chula Vista, US	Kansas City (2019)			
Mexico	Martín Zúñiga	Tampico, Mexico	Chivas USA (2005)			

== South America (CONMEBOL) ==
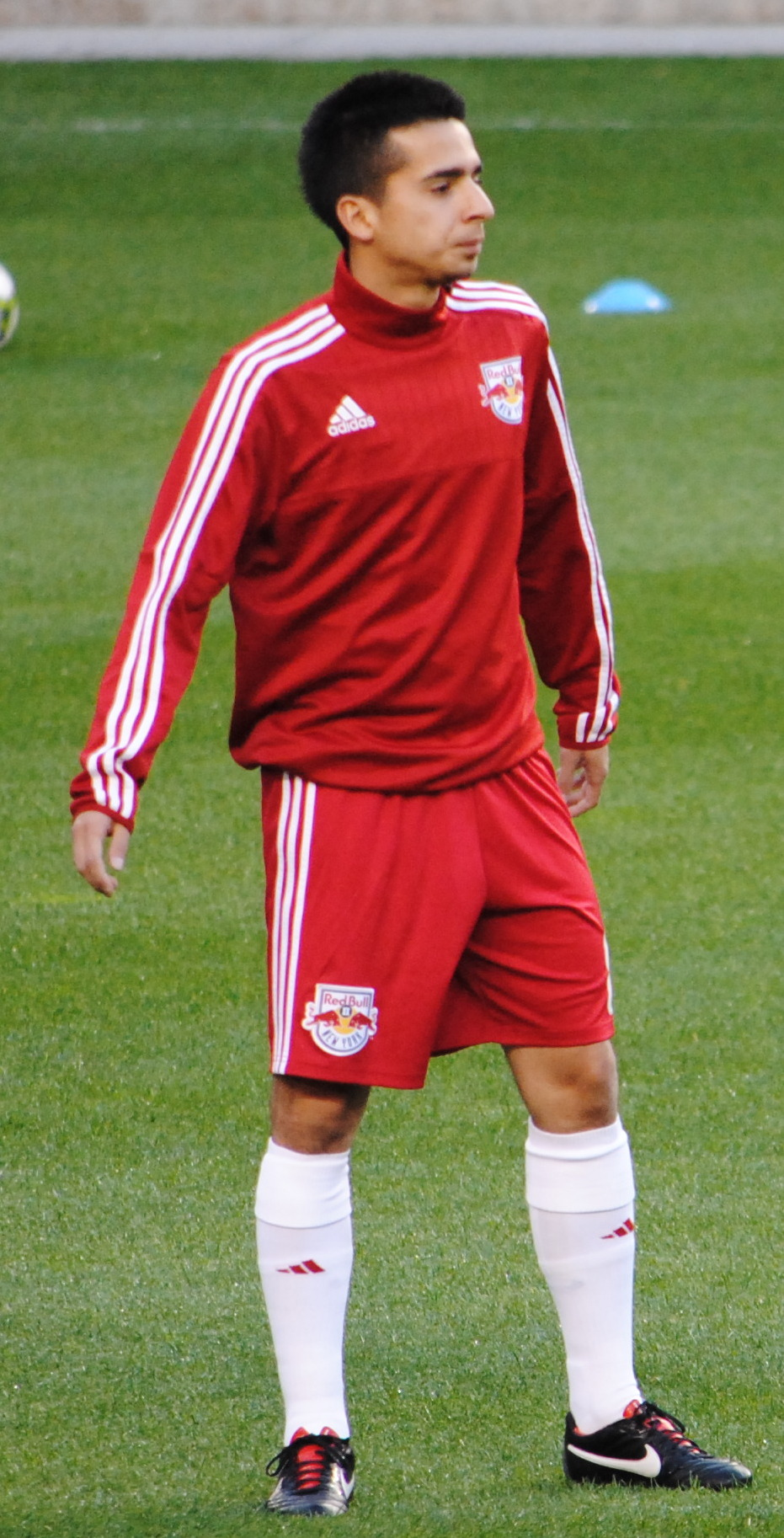
Daniel Bedoya

Country	Name	Birthplace	Most recent MLS team	Former MLS team(s)	Notes	Refs
Argentina	Luciano Abecasis	Rosario, Argentina	San Jose (2021)			
Argentina	Ramón Ábila	Córdoba, Argentina	D.C. United (2022)	Minnesota (2021)		
Argentina	Luciano Acosta	Buenos Aires, Argentina	D.C. United, Cincinnati, Dallas (2016–19, 2021–25)			
Argentina	Ignacio Aliseda	Buenos Aires, Argentina	Chicago (2020–21)			
Argentina	**Tadeo Allende**	Mina Clavero, Argentina	**Inter Miami** (2025–present)			
Argentina	Thiago Almada	Ciudadela, Argentina	Atlanta (2022–24)			
Argentina	Favio Álvarez	Córdoba, Argentina	LA Galaxy (2019)			
Argentina	Adrián Arregui	Berazategui, Argentina	Montreal (2017)			
Argentina	Yamil Asad	San Antonio de Padua, Argentina	Cincinnati (2024)	Atlanta (2017), D.C. United (2018, 2020–21, 2023)		
Argentina	**Julián Aude**	Lanús, Argentina	**LA Galaxy** (2023–present)			
Argentina	Tomás Avilés	Río Gallegos, Argentina	Montréal (2026)	Inter Miami (2023–26)	Capped for Chile's national U20 football team	
Argentina	**David Ayala**	Berazategui, Argentina	**Inter Miami** (2026–present)	Portland (2022–25)		
Argentina	**Elías Báez**		**Atlanta** (2026–present)			
Argentina	Mateo Bajamich	Morrison, Argentina	Houston (2021)			
Argentina	Esequiel Barco	Villa Gobernador Gálvez, Argentina	Atlanta (2018–21)			
Argentina	Álvaro Barreal	Buenos Aires, Argentina	Cincinnati (2020–23)			
Argentina	Leandro Barrera	Godoy Cruz, Argentina	San Jose (2015)	Chivas USA (2014)		
Argentina	Guillermo Barros Schelotto	La Plata, Argentina	Columbus (2007–10)			
Argentina	**Nehuén Benedetti**	Bosques, Argentina	**New York Red Bulls** (2026–present)			
Argentina	Claudio Benetti	Córdoba, Argentina	Dallas (1999–2000)			
Argentina	Hernán Bernardello	Rosario, Argentina	Montreal (2013–14, 2016–17)			
Argentina	Claudio Bieler	Vera, Argentina	Kansas City (2013–14)			
Argentina	Sebastián Blanco	Lomas de Zamora, Argentina	Portland (2017–23)			
Argentina	Emiliano Bonfigli	Bahía Blanca, Argentina	Salt Lake (2012)			
Argentina	Martín Bonjour	Carhué, Argentina	Vancouver (2012)			
Argentina	Gustavo Bou	Concordia, Argentina	New England (2019–23)			
Argentina	**Agustín Bouzat**	Bahía Blanca, Argentina	**Houston** (2026–present)			
Argentina	Claudio Bravo	Lomas de Zamora, Argentina	Portland (2021–25)			
Argentina	Federico Bravo	Jesús María, Argentina	New York City FC (2016)			
Argentina	Víctor Cabrera	Lules, Argentina	Houston (2020)	Montreal (2015–19)		
Argentina	Franco Caraccio	Chacabuco, Argentina	Houston (2008)			
Argentina	Milton Caraglio	Rosario, Argentina	New England (2011)			
Argentina	Julián Carranza	Oncativo, Argentina	Philadelphia (2022–24)	Inter Miami (2020)		
Argentina	Marcelo Carrera	Buenos Aires, Argentina	Columbus (1996–98)			
Argentina	Valentín Castellanos	Mendoza, Argentina	New York City FC (2018–22)			
Argentina	Emanuel Cecchini	Ingeniero Huergo, Argentina	Seattle (2019)			
Argentina	**Tomás Chancalay**	Viale, Argentina	**Minnesota** (2026–present)	New England (2023–25)		
Argentina	Ezequiel Cirigliano	Caseros, Argentina	Dallas (2015)			
Argentina	Eloy Colombano	Pehuajo, Argentina	Kansas City (2007–08)			
Argentina	Tomás Conechny	Comodoro Rivadavia, Argentina	Portland (2018–20)			
Argentina	Enzo Copetti	Roque Sáenz Peña, Argentina	Charlotte (2023–24)			
Argentina	Matías Córdoba	Lanús, Argentina	Salt Lake (2008)			
Argentina	Facundo Coria	Buenos Aires, Argentina	D.C. United (2015)			
Argentina	Franco Coria	Los Toldos, Argentina	New England (2011)			
Argentina	Eduardo Coudet	Buenos Aires, Argentina	Philadelphia (2010)			
Argentina	Emil Cuello	Buenos Aires, Argentina	LA Galaxy (2019–20)			
Argentina	Braian Cufré	Mar del Plata, Argentina	New York City FC (2023)			
Argentina	Cristian da Silva	Rosario, Argentina	MetroStars (1996–98)			
Argentina	**Pedro de la Vega**	Olavarría, Argentina	**Seattle** (2024–present)			
Argentina	**Rodrigo De Paul**	Sarandí, Argentina	**Inter Miami** (2025–present)			
Argentina	Mauro Díaz	Concepción del Uruguay, Argentina	Dallas (2013–18)			
Argentina	Facundo Diz	Argentina	Colorado (2009)			
Argentina	Eduardo Domínguez	Lanús, Argentina	LA Galaxy (2008)			
Argentina	Matías Donnet	Esperanza, Argentina	D.C. United (2006)			
Argentina	Sebastián Driussi	San Justo, Argentina	Austin (2021–24)			
Argentina	Nicolás Dubersarsky	Córdoba, Argentina	Austin (2025–26)			
Argentina	Emiliano Dudar	Buenos Aires, Argentina	D.C. United (2012)			
Argentina	**Ramiro Enrique**	Burzaco, Argentina	**Orlando** (2023–present)			
Argentina	Facundo Erpen	Gualeguaychú, Argentina	Colorado (2007–08)	D.C. United (2005–07)		
Argentina	Luis Miguel Escalada	Ceres, Argentina	Salt Lake (2009)			
Argentina	Franco Escobar	Rosario, Argentina	Houston (2023–25)	Atlanta (2018–20), Los Angeles FC (2022)		
Argentina	Fabián Espíndola	Merlo, Argentina	D.C. United (2013–16)	Salt Lake (2009–12), New York Red Bulls (2013)		
Argentina	**Cristian Espinoza**	Buenos Aires, Argentina	**Nashville** (2026–present)	San Jose (2019–25)		
Argentina	Darío Fabbro	General Deheza, Argentina	New England (2003)	Kansas City (2002–03)		
Argentina	Alejandro Farías	Buenos Aires, Argentina	New England (1997)			
Argentina	Facundo Farías	Santa Fe, Argentina	Inter Miami (2023)			
Argentina	Brian Fernández	Santa Fe, Argentina	Portland (2019)			
Argentina	Gastón Fernández	Lanús, Argentina	Portland (2014–15)			
Argentina	Julián Fernández	Buenos Aires, Argentina	New York City FC (2023–25)			
Argentina	**Nicolás Fernández**	Buenos Aires, Argentina	**New York City FC** (2025–present)			
Argentina	Nicolás Figal	América, Argentina	Inter Miami (2020–21)			
Argentina	Lucio Filomeno	Capital Federal, Argentina	D.C. United (2005–06)			
Argentina	Juan Forchetti	Tres Arroyos, Argentina	MetroStars (2003)			
Argentina	Franco Fragapane	Las Heras, Argentina	Minnesota (2021–24)			
Argentina	Alan Franco	Avellaneda, Argentina	Atlanta (2021–22)			
Argentina	Nicolás Freire	Santa Lucía, Argentina	Inter Miami (2024)			
Argentina	Nicolás Gaitán	San Martín, Argentina	Chicago (2019)			
Argentina	Marcelo Gallardo	Merlo, Argentina	D.C. United (2008)			
Argentina	**Giuliano Galoppo**	Buenos Aires, Argentina	**Atlanta** (2026–present)			
Argentina	Braian Galván	San Miguel de Tucumán, Argentina	Colorado (2020–21, 2023)			
Argentina	José Galván	San Miguel de Tucumán, Argentina	MetroStars (2003)			
Argentina	Sergio Galván Rey	Concepción, Argentina	MetroStars (2004–05)			
Argentina	Walter García	Buenos Aires, Argentina	New York Red Bulls (2009)			
Argentina	**Lautaro Giaccone**	San Francisco, Argentina	**Columbus** (2026–present)			
Argentina	Ian Glavinovich		Philadelphia (2025)			
Argentina	Érik Godoy	Buenos Aires, Argentina	Vancouver (2019–22)			
Argentina	Christian Gómez	Buenos Aires	Colorado (2008)	D.C. United (2004–07)		
Argentina	**Ignacio Gómez**		**Orlando** (2026–present)			
Argentina	Gastón González	Santa Fe, Argentina	Orlando (2023)			
Argentina	Nelson González	Berazategui, Argentina	Salt Lake (2010–11)			
Argentina	Leandro González Pírez	Buenos Aires, Argentina	Inter Miami (2020–21)	Atlanta (2017–19)		
Argentina	Mario Gori	Rosario, Argentina	Columbus (2000)	D.C. United (1996–98), Miami Fusion (1999), New England (1999)		
Argentina	Hernán Grana	Quilmes, Argentina	Dallas (2017)	Columbus (2015)		
Argentina	Sebastián Grazzini	Rosario, Argentina	Chicago (2011–12)			
Argentina	Guillermo Hauche	La Plata, Argentina	New England (2018)			
Argentina	Nicolás Hernández	Buenos Aires, Argentina	Columbus (2008)	Colorado (2006–08)		
Argentina	Marcelo Herrera	San Salvador de Jujuy, Argentina	Miami Fusion (1998)			
Argentina	**Marcelo Herrera**	Corrientes, Argentina	**Columbus** (2024–present)			
Argentina	Federico Higuaín	Buenos Aires, Argentina	Inter Miami (2020–21)	Columbus (2012–19), D.C. United (2010)		
Argentina	Gonzalo Higuaín	Brest, France	Inter Miami (2020–22)			
Argentina	Santiago Hirsig	San Isidro, Argentina	Kansas City (2009–10)			
Argentina	**Lucas Hoyos**	Guaymallén, Argentina	**Atlanta** (2026–present)			
Argentina	Franco Ibarra	Tigre, Argentina	Toronto (2023)	Atlanta (2021–23)		
Argentina	Andrés Imperiale	Rosario, Argentina	San Jose (2016–17)			
Argentina	Emiliano Insúa	Buenos Aires, Argentina	LA Galaxy (2020)			
Argentina	Ricardo Iribarren	Berisso, Argentina	Columbus, Dallas (1996, 1998, 2000)			
Argentina	**Tomás Jacob**	Santa Fe, Argentina	**Atlanta** (2026–present)			
Argentina	Sebastián Jaime	La Plata, Argentina	Salt Lake (2014–15)			
Argentina	Lucas Janson	Olavarría, Argentina	Toronto (2018)			
Argentina	Agustin Jara	Corral de Bustos, Argentina	Dallas (2016)			
Argentina	Franco Jara	Villa María, Argentina	Dallas (2020–22)			
Argentina	Leonardo Jara	Corrientes, Argentina	D.C. United (2019)			
Argentina	Matías Laba	Villa Raffo, Argentina	Vancouver (2014–17)	Toronto (2013)		
Argentina	**Luca Langoni**	Gregorio de Laferrère, Argentina	**New England** (2024–present)			
Argentina	Carlos Ledesma	Argentina	MetroStars (1998)			
Argentina	Emmanuel Ledesma	Quilmes, Argentina	Cincinnati (2019)			
Argentina	Claudio López	Río Tercero, Argentina	Colorado (2010)	Kansas City (2008–09)		
Argentina	Hernán López	Villa del Parque, Argentina	San Jose (2024–25)			
Argentina	Lisandro López	Rafael Obligado, Argentina	Atlanta (2021)			
Argentina	Miguel López	Ensenada	LA Galaxy (2011)			
Argentina	**Gonzalo Luján**	Buenos Aires, Argentina	**Inter Miami** (2025–present)			
Argentina	Emanuel Maciel	José C. Paz, Argentina	Montreal (2020–21)			
Argentina	Cristian Maidana	Resistencia, Argentina	Houston (2016)	Philadelphia (2014–15)		
Argentina	**Julián Malatini**	General Cabrera, Argentina	**Cincinnati** (2026–present)			
Argentina	Matias Mantilla	Buenos Aires, Argentina	Salt Lake (2007–08)			
Argentina	Carlos Marinelli	Villa de Mayo, Argentina	Kansas City (2007–08)			
Argentina	Diego Martínez	General Pacheco, Argentina	New York City FC (2016)			
Argentina	Pity Martínez	Guayamallén, Argentina	Atlanta (2019–20)			
Argentina	Juan Manuel Martínez	Viedma, Argentina	Salt Lake (2015–16)			
Argentina	Tomás Martínez	Béccar, Argentina	Houston (2017–20)			
Argentina	Emmanuel Mas	San Juan, Argentina	Orlando (2021)			
Argentina	Lucas Melano	Hernando, Argentina	Portland (2015–16)			
Argentina	Jonathan Menéndez	Buenos Aires, Argentina	Salt Lake (2021–22)			
Argentina	**Lionel Messi**	Rosario, Argentina	**Inter Miami** (2023–present)			
Argentina	Fernando Meza	San Martín, Argentina	Atlanta (2020)			
Argentina	Sergio Miguez	San Isidro, Argentina	Columbus (1997)			
Argentina	Mariano Miño	Tigre, Argentina	Toronto (2018)			
Argentina	Leonel Miranda	Avellaneda, Argentina	Houston (2015–16)			
Argentina	Marcos Mondaini	Sáenz Peña, Argentina	Chivas USA (2011)			
Argentina	Javier Morales	Buenos Aires, Argentina	Dallas (2017)	Salt Lake (2007–16)		
Argentina	**Maximiliano Moralez**	Granadero Baigorria, Argentina	**New York City FC** (2017–present)			
Argentina	Marcelino Moreno	San Martín, Argentina	Atlanta (2020–22)			
Argentina	**Facundo Mura**	General Roca, Argentina	**Inter Miami** (2026–present)			
Argentina	Federico Navarro	Frontera, Argentina	Chicago (2021–24)			
Argentina	Beto Naveda	San Juan, Argentina	New England (1996–97)			
Argentina	**Franco Negri**	San Martín, Argentina	**Houston** (2026–present)	Inter Miami (2023–24), San Diego (2025)		
Argentina	Franco Niell	Trelew, Argentina	D.C. United (2008)			
Argentina	**Agustín Ojeda**	Rosario, Argentina	**New York City FC** (2024–present)			
Argentina	**Martín Ojeda**	Gualeguaychú, Argentina	**Orlando** (2023–present)			
Argentina	Lucas Ontivero	Catamarca, Argentina	Montreal (2016)			
Argentina	Luca Orellano	Francisco Álvarez, Argentina	Cincinnati (2024–25)			
Argentina	Christian Ortiz	Rosario, Argentina	Charlotte (2022)			
Argentina	Rodrigo Pacheco	Buenos Aires, Argentina	Los Angeles FC (2018)			
Argentina	Gino Padula	Lanús, Argentina	Columbus (2008–10)			
Argentina	Norberto Paparatto	Adrogué, Argentina	Portland (2014–15)			
Argentina	Cristian Pavón	Córdoba, Argentina	LA Galaxy (2019–20)			
Argentina	Daniel Peinado	San Rafael, Argentina	Dallas (1997)			
Argentina	Matías Pellegrini	Magdalena, Argentina	New York City FC (2023)	Inter Miami (2020, 2022)		
Argentina	Agustín Pelletieri	Buenos Aires, Argentina	Chivas USA (2014)			
Argentina	Gonzalo Peralta	Munro, Argentina	D.C. United (2008)			
Argentina	**Joaquín Pereyra**	Paraná, Argentina	**Minnesota** (2024–present)			
Argentina	Matías Pérez García	Tartagal, Argentina	Orlando (2016–17)	San Jose (2014–16)		
Argentina	Ignacio Piatti	General Baldissera, Argentina	Montreal (2014–19)			
Argentina	Pablo Piatti	Ucacha, Argentina	Toronto (2020)			
Argentina	Juan Pietravallo	Buenos Aires, Argentina	New York Red Bulls (2008–09)			
Argentina	Lucas Pittinari	Laborde, Argentina	Colorado (2015)			
Argentina	Tomás Pochettino	Rafaela, Argentina	Austin (2021)			
Argentina	Ezequiel Ponce	Rosario, Argentina	Houston (2024–26)			
Argentina	Facundo Quignon	Buenos Aires, Argentina	Dallas (2021–23)			
Argentina	Juan Ramírez	Moreno, Argentina	Colorado (2015)			
Argentina	Federico Redondo	Madrid, Spain	Inter Miami (2024–25)			
Argentina	Eric Remedi	Paraná, Argentina	San Jose (2021–22)	Atlanta (2018–21)		
Argentina	**Agustin Resch**		**Houston** (2026–present)			
Argentina	Emanuel Reynoso	Córdoba, Argentina	Minnesota (2020–24)			
Argentina	Pablo Ricchetti	Buenos Aires, Argentina	Dallas (2007–09)			
Argentina	Emiliano Rigoni	Colonia Caroya, Argentina	Austin (2022–24)			
Argentina	Andrés Ríos	Buenos Aires, Argentina	San Jose (2019–21)			
Argentina	**Rocco Ríos Novo**	Los Angeles, US	**Inter Miami** (2025–present)	Atlanta (2022)		
Argentina	Martín Rivero	Roldán, Argentina	Chivas USA (2014)	Colorado (2012–13)		
Argentina	Javier Robles	Buenos Aires, Argentina	San Jose (2010)			
Argentina	Baltasar Rodríguez	Monte Hermoso, Argentina	Inter Miami (2025)			
Argentina	Lucas Rodríguez	Buenos Aires, Argentina	D.C. United (2019)			
Argentina	Andrés Romero	Bell Ville, Argentina	Montreal (2013–15, 2017)			
Argentina	**Nicolás Romero**	Chumbicha, Argentina	**Minnesota** (2025–present)			
Argentina	Mauro Rosales	Villa María, Argentina	Vancouver (2014–15, 2017)	Seattle (2011–13), Chivas USA (2014), Dallas (2016)		
Argentina	Silvio Rudman	Buenos Aires, Argentina	Columbus (1997)			
Argentina	**Pablo Ruíz**	Comodoro Rivadavia, Argentina	**LA Galaxy** (2026–present)	Salt Lake (2017–18, 2020–26)		
Argentina	Darío Sala	Córdoba, Argentina	Dallas (2005–10)			
Argentina	Matías Sánchez	Temperley, Argentina	Columbus (2013)			
Argentina	Martin Šarić	Buenos Aires, Argentina	Toronto (2010)			
Argentina	Gastón Sauro	Rosario, Argentina	Columbus (2015–16, 2018–19)			
Argentina	Rodrigo Schlegel	Remedios de Escalada, Argentina	Orlando (2020–25)			
Argentina	**Mateo Silvetti**	Rosario, Argentina	**Inter Miami** (2025–present)			
Argentina	Luis Solignac	Buenos Aires, Argentina	Chicago (2016–18)	Colorado (2015–16)		
Argentina	Diego Soñora	Buenos Aires, Argentina	Tampa Bay (2001)	Dallas (1996–97), MetroStars (1998), D.C. United (1999)		
Argentina	Santiago Sosa	La Plata, Argentina	Atlanta (2021–23)			
Argentina	Leonardo Squadrone	La Plata, Argentina	New England (1997)			
Argentina	Nicolás Stefanelli	Quilmes, Argentina	Inter Miami (2023)			
Argentina	Joaquín Torres	Neuquén, Argentina	Philadelphia (2023–24)	Montreal (2021–22)		
Argentina	Maximiliano Urruti	Rosario, Argentina	New England (2025)	Toronto (2013), Portland (2013–15), Dallas (2016–18), Montreal (2019–20), Houston (2021), Austin (2022–23)		
Argentina	Oscar Ustari	América, Argentina	Inter Miami (2024–25)			
Argentina	Milton Valenzuela	Rosario, Argentina	Columbus (2018, 2020–21)			
Argentina	Diego Valeri	Lanús, Argentina	Portland (2013–21)			
Argentina	Jorge Vázquez	Buenos Aires, Argentina	New England (2003)			
Argentina	Daniel Vega	Cutral Có, Argentina	San Jose (2019–21)			
Argentina	Alan Velasco	Quilmes, Argentina	Dallas (2022–24)			
Argentina	Matías Vera	Merlo, Argentina	Houston (2019–22)			
Argentina	Gonzalo Verón	Moreno, Argentina	New York Red Bulls (2015–17)			
Argentina	Pablo Vitti	Rosario, Argentina	Toronto (2009)			
Argentina	Marcelo Weigandt	Avellaneda, Argentina	Inter Miami (2024–25)			
Bolivia	Pato Aguilera	Santa Cruz	New England (2001)	Columbus (2000–01)		
Bolivia	Marco Etcheverry	Santa Cruz, Bolivia	D.C. United (1996–2003)			
Bolivia	José Carlos Fernández	Santa Cruz, Bolivia	New England (2001)			
Bolivia	Jefferson Gottardi	Santa Cruz, Bolivia	Tampa Bay (1999)			
Bolivia	Cristhian Machado	Cochabamba, Bolivia	New England (2018)			
Bolivia	Bruno Miranda	Santa Cruz, Bolivia	D.C. United (2017–18)			
Bolivia	**Efrain Morales**	Decatur, US	**Montréal** (2025–present)	Atlanta (2024–25)		
Bolivia	Jaime Moreno	Santa Cruz, Bolivia	D.C. United (1996–02, 2004–10)	MetroStars (2003–04)		
Bolivia	Juan Manuel Peña	Santa Cruz, Bolivia	D.C. United (2010)			
Bolivia	Jairo Quinteros	Santa Cruz, Bolivia	Inter Miami (2022)			
Bolivia	Mauricio Ramos	Santa Cruz, Bolivia	New England (2000)	Tampa Bay (1998–99)		
Bolivia	Maurizio Rocha	Santa Cruz, Bolivia	Miami Fusion (1999–00)			
Bolivia	Sergio Salas	Cochabamba, Bolivia	D.C. United (2000)			
Bolivia	Berthy Suárez	Santa Cruz, Bolivia	D.C. United (1996)			
Bolivia	Joselito Vaca	Santa Cruz, Bolivia	MetroStars (2004)	Dallas (2001–03)		
Brazil	Adaílton	Salvador, Brazil	Chicago (2015)			
Brazil	Adauto Neto	Itabuna, Brazil	Dallas (2002)			
Brazil	Alex	São Paulo, Brazil	Houston (2015–17)	Chicago (2012–15)		
Brazil	Alex Cazumba	Amélia Rodrigues, Brazil	LA Galaxy (2010)			
Brazil	Alexandre Pato	Pato Branco, Brazil	Orlando (2021–22)			
Brazil	**Álvaro Augusto**		**Dallas** (2025–present)			
Brazil	Álvaro Pires	Jardinópolis, Brazil	LA Galaxy (2008)			
Brazil	Anderson Conceição	Caravelas, Brazil	Philadelphia (2016)			
Brazil	**Anderson Rosa**		**Colorado** (2025–present)			
Brazil	**André Luiz**	Rio de Janeiro, Brazil	**Kansas City** (2026–present)			
Brazil	André Rocha	São Paulo, Brazil	Dallas (2008–09)			
Brazil	Andre Shinyashiki	São Paulo, Brazil	Charlotte (2022–23)	Colorado (2019–22)		
Brazil	**Antônio Carlos**	Rio de Janeiro, Brazil	**Houston** (2025–present)	Orlando (2020–23)		
Brazil	**Antony**	Curitiba, Brazil	**Portland** (2023–present)			
Brazil	**Artur**	Brumado, Brazil	**Houston** (2023–present)	Columbus (2017–22)		
Brazil	Auro Jr.	Jaú, Brazil	Toronto (2018–21)			
Brazil	Branco	Bagé, Brazil	MetroStars (1997)			
Brazil	Brenner	Cuiabá, Brazil	Cincinnati (2021–23, 2025)			
Brazil	Bressan	Caxias do Sul, Brazil	Dallas (2019–21)			
Brazil	Bruno Guarda	Piracicaba, Brazil	Dallas (2008–12)			
Brazil	Bruno Menezes	Santos, Brazil	Chicago (2007)			
Brazil	Caio Alexandre	Duque de Caxias, Brazil	Vancouver (2021–22)			
Brazil	Camilo Sanvezzo	Presidente Prudente, Brazil	Vancouver (2011–13)			
Brazil	**Casemiro**	São José dos Campos, Brazil	**Inter Miami** (2026–present)			
Brazil	Cássio	Rio de Janeiro, Brazil	New England (2005)			
Brazil	Catê	Cruz Alta, Brazil	New England (2001)			
Brazil	**Célio Pompeu**	Fortaleza, Brazil	**St. Louis** (2023–present)			
Brazil	**Daniel**	Barra do Garças, Brazil	**Dallas** (2026–present)	San Jose (2023–26)		
Brazil	Danilo Silva	Campinas, Brazil	Los Angeles FC (2018–20)	MetroStars (2005)		
Brazil	David Lopes	Maringá, Brazil	LA Galaxy (2012)	Chivas USA (2011–12)		
Brazil	Dejair	Brasília, Brazil	Chivas USA (2008)			
Brazil	Denílson	Diadema, Brazil	Dallas (2007)			
Brazil	**Diego Borges**	Agudos, Brazil	**Kansas City** (2026–present)			
Brazil	Diego Walsh	Santos, Brazil	Kansas City (2004–05)	Columbus (2003)		
Brazil	Douglas Costa	Sapucaia do Sul, Brazil	LA Galaxy (2022–23)			
Brazil	Edu	Jaú, Brazil	Colorado (2012)			
Brazil	Eduardo	Rio de Janeiro, Brazil	San Jose (2010)			
Brazil	Elias Manoel	Campinas, Brazil	New York Red Bulls (2022–24)			
Brazil	Erick	Ilha Solteira, Brazil	Dallas (2013)			
Brazil	**Evander**	Rio de Janeiro, Brazil	**Cincinnati** (2025–present)	Portland (2023–24)		
Brazil	Everton Luiz	Porto Alegre, Brazil	Salt Lake (2019–22)			
Brazil	Fabinho	Ariquemes, Brazil	Philadelphia (2013–19)			
Brazil	Fábio	São Paulo, Brazil	New York Red Bulls (2021)			
Brazil	**Felipe Andrade**	Boa Viagem, Brazil	**Houston** (2025–present)			
Brazil	Felipe	Engenheiro Beltrão, Brazil	Orlando (2023–24)	Montreal (2012–14), New York Red Bulls (2015–18), Vancouver (2018–19), D.C. United (2019–21), Austin (2022)		
Brazil	Fernando Bob	Cabo Frio, Brazil	Minnesota (2018)			
Brazil	Fred	Belo Horizonte, Brazil	Philadelphia (2014–15)	D.C. United (2007–11)		
Brazil	Gabriel Pec	Petrópolis, Brazil	LA Galaxy (2024–26)			
Brazil	Gabriel Pereira	São Paulo, Brazil	New York City FC (2022–23)			
Brazil	**Gabriel Pirani**	Penápolis, Brazil	**San Diego** (2026–present)	D.C. United (2023–26)		
Brazil	Geovane Jesus	Riacho de Santana, Brazil	Dallas (2023)			
Brazil	Geovanni	Acaiaca, Brazil	San Jose (2010)			
Brazil	Getterson	Engenheiro Beltrão, Brazil	Dallas (2016)			
Brazil	Gilberto	Piranhas, Brazil	Chicago (2015–16)	Toronto (2014–15)		
Brazil	Gilberto Flores	Toledo, Brazil	MetroStars (2004–05)			
Brazil	Gilmar	São Paulo, Brazil	MetroStars (2001)	Tampa Bay (1997–98)		
Brazil	Gláuber	São José do Rio Preto, Brazil	Columbus (2013)			
Brazil	Gregore	Juiz de Fora, Brazil	Inter Miami (2021–23)			
Brazil	Guido	Ribeirão Preto, Brazil	MetroStars – 1997)			
Brazil	**Guilherme**	São Paulo, Brazil	**Houston** (2026–present)			
Brazil	**Guilherme Biro**	Curitiba, Brazil	**Austin** (2024–present)			
Brazil	Guly do Prado	Campinas, Brazil	Chicago (2015)			
Brazil	Héber	Colorado do Oeste, Brazil	Seattle (2023)	New York City FC (2019–22)		
Brazil	**Iago Teodoro**	Volta Redonda	**Orlando** (2026–present)			
Brazil	Ibson	São Gonçalo, Brazil	Minnesota (2017–18)			
Brazil	**Igor Jesus**	Goiânia, Brazil	**Los Angeles FC** (2025–present)			
Brazil	Igor Julião	Rio de Janeiro, Brazil	Kansas City (2014, 2017)			
Brazil	Ilsinho	São Bernardo do Campo, Brazil	Philadelphia (2016–21)			
Brazil	Jackson	Franca	Toronto (2014–15)	Dallas (2010–13)		
Brazil	Jailson	Caçapava do Sul, Brazil	Los Angeles FC (2025)			
Brazil	Jean Mota	São Paulo, Brazil	Inter Miami (2022–24)			
Brazil	Jeanderson	Serra, Brazil	Portland (2015)			
Brazil	Jéferson	Brasíilia, Brazil	Kansas City (2011)			
Brazil	João Batista	Brazil	Tampa Bay (1997)			
Brazil	João Luiz	Brazil	MetroStars (1997)			
Brazil	João Paulo	Serafina Corrêa, Brazil	Seattle (2020–25)			
Brazil	João Pedro	Indaiatuba, Brazil	Charlotte (2024)			
Brazil	**João Peglow**	Porto Alegre, Brazil	**D.C. United** (2025–present)			
Brazil	Judson	Arês, Brazil	San Jose (2019–23)			
Brazil	Júlio Baptista	São Paulo, Brazil	Orlando (2016)			
Brazil	Júlio César	São Luís, Brazil	Kansas City (2011–12)			
Brazil	Júlio César	Duque de Caxias, Brazil	Toronto (2014)			
Brazil	Juninho	São José dos Campos, Brazil	LA Galaxy (2010–15, 2019)	Chicago (2017)		
Brazil	Juninho	Nova Iguaçu, Brazil	Orlando (2023)			
Brazil	Juninho Pernambucano	Recife, Brazil	New York Red Bulls (2013)			
Brazil	Júnior Carreiro	Belo Horizonte, Brazil	D.C. United (2010)			
Brazil	Júnior Urso	Taboão da Serra, Brazil	Houston (2025)	Orlando (2020–23), Charlotte (2024)		
Brazil	**Kaick**	Rio de Janeiro, Brazil	**Dallas** (2025–present)			
Brazil	Kaká	Gama, Brazil	Orlando (2015–17)			
Brazil	**Klauss**	Criciúma, Brazil	**LA Galaxy** (2026–present)	St. Louis (2023–25)		
Brazil	Kléberson	Uraí, Brazil	Philadelphia (2013)			
Brazil	Leo Afonso	São Paulo, Brazil	Atlanta (2025)	Inter Miami (2024–25)		
Brazil	Léo Chú	Porto Alegre, Brazil	Dallas (2025)	Seattle (2021–24)		
Brazil	Leo Fernandes	São Paulo, Brazil	Philadelphia (2013–14, 2016)			
Brazil	Léo Pereira	Curitiba, Brazil	Orlando (2017)			
Brazil	Leonardo	São Paulo, Brazil	Houston (2013–18)	LA Galaxy (2010–11)		
Brazil	**Lineker Rodrigues**		**Salt Lake** (2026–present)			
Brazil	**Lucas Calegari**	Cuiabá, Brazil	**LA Galaxy** (2023, 2026–present)			
Brazil	Lucas Esteves	São Paulo, Brazil	Colorado (2021–22)			
Brazil	**Lucas Halter**	Salto, Brazil	**Houston** (2026–present)			
Brazil	Lucas Venuto	Governador Valadares, Brazil	Vancouver (2019)			
Brazil	Luciano Emílio	Ilha Solteira, Brazil	D.C. United (2007–10)			
Brazil	**Luighi**	São Paulo, Brazil	**New York City FC** (2026–present)			
Brazil	**Luis Otávio**	Beberibe, Brazil	**Orlando** (2026–present)			
Brazil	Luiz Araújo	Taquaritinga, Brazil	Atlanta (2021–23)			
Brazil	Luiz Camargo	Vinhedo, Brazil	Houston (2011–13)			
Brazil	Luquinhas	Ceilândia, Brazil	New York Red Bulls (2022–23)			
Brazil	Maciel	Rio de Janeiro, Brazil	New England (2021–22)			
Brazil	Maicon Santos	Paracambi, Brazil	Chicago (2013)	Chivas USA (2009–10), Toronto (2010–11), Dallas (2011), D.C. United (2012)		
Brazil	Marcelo	São Carlos, Brazil	Chicago (2019)			
Brazil	Marcelo Saragosa	Campo Grande, Brazil	D.C. United (2012–13)	LA Galaxy (2004–06), Dallas (2006–09) Chivas USA (2009–10)		
Brazil	Marcelo Sarvas	São Paulo, Brazil	D.C. United (2016–17)	LA Galaxy (2012–14), Colorado (2015)		
Brazil	Marcos Dias	Formoso do Araguaia, Brazil	New England (2024)			
Brazil	Marquinho	Porto Alegre, Brazil	Colorado (1998)			
Brazil	Marlon	Duque de Caxias, Brazil	Los Angeles FC (2024–25)			
Brazil	Marquinhos Pedroso	Tubarão, Brazil	D.C. United (2019)	Dallas (2018–19)		
Brazil	Mateus Jordão Costa		Salt Lake (2010-2013)			
Brazil	Matheus Aiás	Palmares Paulista, Brazil	Orlando (2020–21)			
Brazil	Matheus Davó	São Paulo, Brazil	Philadelphia (2021)			
Brazil	**Matheus Nascimento**	Niterói, Brazil	**LA Galaxy** (2025–present)			
Brazil	**Matheus Pereira**	São Paulo, Brazil	**Toronto** (2026–present)			
Brazil	Matheus Rossetto	Santo Amaro da Imperatriz, Brazil	Atlanta (2020–23)			
Brazil	Matheus Silva	Taboão da Serra, Brazil	San Jose (2016)			
Brazil	Max	Juiz de Fora, Brazil	Colorado (2022–23)			
Brazil	Maximiniano	Rio de Janeiro, Brazil	Minnesota (2018)			
Brazil	**Micael**	Presidente Prudente, Brazil	**Inter Miami** (2026–)	Houston (2022–24)		
Brazil	Michel	Vitória, Brazil	Dallas (2013–15)			
Brazil	Naldo	Rio de Janeiro, Brazil	LA Galaxy (2005–06)			
Brazil	Nathan	São Paulo, Brazil	Seattle (2024)	San Jose (2021–22)		
Brazil	Nathan Fogaça	Palmeira, Brazil	Portland (2022–24)			
Brazil	Nicolas Firmino	Mantena, Brazil	Atlanta (2023–24)			
Brazil	Paulinho McLaren	Igaraçu do Tietê, Brazil	Miami Fusion (1998)			
Brazil	Pablo Campos	São Paulo, Brazil	Salt Lake (2009–10)	San Jose (2009)		
Brazil	Paulo Jr.	Teresina, Brazil	Salt Lake (2010–12)			
Brazil	Paulo Nagamura	São Paulo, Brazil	Kansas City (2012–16)	LA Galaxy (2005–06), Toronto (2007), Chivas USA (2007–09, 2010–11)		
Brazil	PC	São Paulo, Brazil	Vancouver (2019)	Orlando (2017–18)		
Brazil	Pecka	Rio de Janeiro, Brazil	Salt Lake (2015)			
Brazil	Pedrinho	Rio de Janeiro, Brazil	Dallas (2025)			
Brazil	**Pedro Castro**		**New York Red Bulls** (2026–present)			
Brazil	**Pedro Leão**		**Orlando** (2026–present)			
Brazil	Pedro Ribeiro	Belo Horizonte, Brazil	Orlando (2015–16)	Philadelphia (2014)		
Brazil	Phelipe Megiolaro	Campinas, Brazil	Dallas (2020–21)			
Brazil	Rafael	Água Boa, Brazil	D.C. United (2013)			
Brazil	**Rafael Cabral**	Sorocaba, Brazil	**Salt Lake** (2025–present)			
Brazil	Rafael Gomes	Rio de Janeiro, Brazil	Colorado (2008)			
Brazil	**Rafael Navarro**	Cabo Frio, Brazil	**St. Louis** (2026–present)	Colorado (2023–26)		
Brazil	**Rafael Santos**	Londrina, Brazil	**St. Louis** (2026–present)	Orlando (2023–25), Colorado (2025)		
Brazil	**Ramiro**	Gramado, Brazil	**Dallas** (2025–present)			
Brazil	Raphael Augusto	Rio de Janeiro, Brazil	D.C. United (2013)			
Brazil	**Raul Gustavo**	Pedro Leopoldo, Brazil	**New York City FC** (2025–present)			
Brazil	Ricardinho	Sinop, Brazil	Dallas (2007–08)			
Brazil	Ricardo Villar	São Paulo, Brazil	Dallas (2011–12)			
Brazil	Ricardo Virtuoso	Guarapuava, Brazil	Columbus (2006–07)			
Brazil	**Riquelme Fillipi**	Santo André, Brazil	**Inter Miami** (2026–present)			
Brazil	Roberto Gaúcho	Santa Rosa, Brazil	Miami Fusion (1999)			
Brazil	Roberto Linck	Cachoeira do Sul, Brazil	New England (2010)			
Brazil	Robinho	Senador Pompeu, Brazil	Orlando (2019–20)	Columbus (2019)		
Brazil	Rodrigo Faria	Rio de Janeiro, Brazil	MetroStars, Chicago, San Jose (2001–03)			
Brazil	Rodrigo Ramos	Juazeiro, Brazil	Chicago (2016)			
Brazil	Rodrigues	Arês, Brazil	San Jose (2022–25)			
Brazil	Ruan	Rio de Janeiro, Brazil	Dallas (2024)	Orlando (2019–22), D.C. United (2023), Montréal (2024)		
Brazil	Rwan Cruz	Jaboatão dos Guararapes, Brazil	Salt Lake (2025)			
Brazil	Samuel	São Borja, Brazil	LA Galaxy (2014)			
Brazil	**Sérgio Santos**	Belo Horizonte, Brazil	**Atlanta** (2026–present)	Philadelphia (2019–22), Cincinnati (2022–25), Houston (2025)		
Brazil	Stefani Miglioranzi	Poços de Caldas, Brazil	Philadelphia (2010–11)	LA Galaxy (2006, 2009), Columbus (2007–08)		
Brazil	Stefano Pinho	São João Nepomuceno, Brazil	Orlando (2018)			
Brazil	**Talles Magno**	Rio de Janeiro, Brazil	**New York City FC** (2021–24, 2026–present)			
Brazil	**Thayllon Roberth**		**Los Angeles FC** (2026–present)			
Brazil	Thiago	Porto Alegre, Brazil	Chicago (2005–07)			
Brazil	Thiago	Brazil	LA Galaxy (2006)			
Brazil	Thiago Andrade	Araras, Brazil	New York City FC (2021–23)			
Brazil	Thiago Fernandes	Recife, Brazil	Houston (2022)			
Brazil	Thiago Martins	São Paulo, Brazil	Colorado (2006)	D.C. United (2003), Chivas USA (2005), New York Red Bulls (2006)		
Brazil	**Thiago Martins**	São João Evangelista, Brazil	**New York City FC** (2022–present)			
Brazil	Thiago Santos	Curitiba, Brazil	Dallas (2020)			
Brazil	**Tiago**	Ipirá, Brazil	**Orlando** (2026–present)			
Brazil	Thomás	Juiz de Fora, Brazil	Seattle (2015)			
Brazil	Vinicius Mello	Sapucaia do Sul, Brazil	Charlotte (2023)			
Brazil	**Vinícius Nogueira**	Penápolis, Brazil	**Orlando** (2026–present)			
Brazil	**Vítor Costa**	Valente, Brazil	**San Jose** (2024–present)			
Brazil	Wélton	Cambuci, Brazil	Miami Fusion (1999–00)	New England (1996), LA Galaxy (1997–98)		
Brazil	William Oliveira	São Paulo, Brazil	Chicago (2007)			
Brazil	Zeca	Paranavaí, Brazil	Houston (2022)			
Brazil	Zico		San Jose (1997)			
Chile	Miguel Aceval	Santiago, Chile	Toronto (2012)			
Chile	Pablo Aránguiz	Independencia, Chile	Dallas (2018–19)			
Chile	**Alexander Aravena**	Huechuraba, Chile	**Portland** (2026–present)			
Chile	José Bizama	Curanilahue, Chile	Houston (2019–21)			
Chile	Carlos Carmona	Coquimbo, Chile	Atlanta (2017)			
Chile	**Paulo Díaz**	Santa Cruz, Chile	**Atlanta** (2026–present)			
Chile	Carlos Farias	Santiago, Chile	San Jose (1999)			
Chile	**Thomas Gillier**	Las Condes, Chile	**Montréal** (2025–present)			
Chile	Marcos González	Rio de Janeiro, Brazil	Columbus (2006–07)			
Chile	Felipe Gutiérrez	Quintero, Chile	Colorado (2022–23)	Kansas City (2018–19)		
Chile	Kevin Harbottle	Antofagasta, Chile	Colorado (2013)			
Chile	Pablo Hernández	Tucumán, Argentina	D.C. United (2010)			
Chile	**Benjamín Kuscevic**	Santiago, Chile	**Toronto** (2026–present)			
Chile	Favian Loyola	Camp Lejeune, US	Orlando (2023)		Capped for the US men's national U17 and U19 teams	
Chile	Luis Marín	Valparaíso, Chile	Kansas City (2015)			
Chile	Victor Mella	Santiago, Chile	New England (1998)	San Jose (1996)		
Chile	Sebastián Miranda	Las Condes, Chile	Columbus (2011–12)			
Chile	Milovan Mirošević	Santiago, Chile	Columbus (2012)			
Chile	Felipe Mora	Santiago, Chile	Portland (2020–26)			
Chile	Marcelo Morales	Santiago, Chile	New York Red Bulls (2025)			
Chile	Pedro Morales	Hualpén, Chile	Vancouver (2014–16)			
Chile	Raúl Palacios	Los Andes, Chile	Colorado (2002)			
Chile	Martín Rodríguez	Diego de Almagro, Chile	D.C. United (2022, 2024)			
Chile	Sebastián Rozental	Santiago, Chile	Columbus (2006)			
Chile	Diego Rubio	Santiago, Chile	Austin (2024–25)	Kansas City (2016–18), Colorado (2019–23)		
Chile	**Alexis Sánchez**	Tocopilla, Chile	**Montréal** (2026–present)			
Chile	**Gonzalo Tapia**	Recoleta	**Columbus** (2026–present)			
Chile	Jeisson Vargas	Recoleta, Chile	Montreal (2018)			
Chile	Marcelo Vega	Copiapó, Chile	MetroStars (1998)			
Colombia	Abel Aguilar	Bogotá, Colombia	Dallas (2018)			
Colombia	Fernando Álvarez	New York City, US	Montréal (2023–25)		Capped for Mexico's U16 and U18 football teams	
Colombia	Leonel Álvarez	Remedios, Colombia	New England (1999–01)	Dallas (1996, 1998–99)		
Colombia	Pedro Álvarez	Itagüí, Colombia	MetroStars (2001)			
Colombia	**Steven Alzate**	Camden, England	**Atlanta** (2025–present)			
Colombia	Rafael Amaya	Bogotá, Colombia	Colorado (1997)	San Jose (1996)		
Colombia	Juan Pablo Ángel	Medellín, Colombia	Chivas USA (2011–12)	New York Red Bulls (2007–10), LA Galaxy (2011)		
Colombia	Tomás Ángel	Birmingham, England	San Diego (2025–26)	Los Angeles FC (2024)		
Colombia	**Iván Angulo**	Tumaco, Colombia	**Orlando** (2022–present)			
Colombia	Cristian Arango	Medellín, Colombia	San Jose (2025)	Los Angeles FC (2021–22), Salt Lake (2023–24)		
Colombia	Victor Arboleda	El Cerrito, Colombia	Portland (2017–18)			
Colombia	Yair Arboleda	Tuluá, Colombia	Houston (2016)			
Colombia	**Juan José Arias**		**Salt Lake** (2026–present)			
Colombia	Santiago Arias	Medellín, Colombia	Cincinnati (2023)			
Colombia	**Emilio Aristizábal**		**Toronto** (2026–present)			
Colombia	Jhonny Arteaga	Cali, Colombia	New York Red Bulls (2012)			
Colombia	Dairon Asprilla	Istmina, Colombia	Portland (2015–24)			
Colombia	**Eduard Atuesta**	Vélez, Colombia	**Orlando** (2024–present)	Los Angeles FC (2018–21)		
Colombia	Michael Barrios	Barranquilla, Colombia	LA Galaxy (2023)	Dallas (2015–20), Colorado (2021–23)		
Colombia	**Andy Batioja**		**Houston** (2025–present)			
Colombia	**Julián Bazán**	Pereira, Colombia	**New York Red Bulls** (2026–present)			
Colombia	Daniel Bedoya	Medellín, Colombia	New York City FC (2019)			
Colombia	Jair Benítez	Jamundí, Colombia	Dallas (2009–14)			
Colombia	Dylan Borrero	Palmira, Colombia	New England (2022–24)			
Colombia	Michael Bustamante	Medellín, Colombia	New York Red Bulls (2014)			
Colombia	Juan David Cabezas	Cali, Colombia	Houston (2017–19)			
Colombia	Jorge Cabezas Hurtado	Tumaco, Colombia	New York Red Bulls (2023)			
Colombia	Déiber Caicedo	Barbacoas, Colombia	Vancouver (2021–24)			
Colombia	Juan Caicedo	Carepa, Colombia	New England (2019)			
Colombia	**José Caicedo**	Palmira, Colombia	**Portland** (2026–present)			
Colombia	Luis Caicedo	Apartadó, Colombia	Houston (2023)	New England (2018–19, 2021)		
Colombia	Javier Calle	Medellín, Colombia	New York City FC (2015)			
Colombia	Fernando Cárdenas	Cartago, Colombia	New England (2012)			
Colombia	Juan Castilla	Cali, Colombia	Houston (2021)			
Colombia	Fabián Castillo	Cali, Colombia	Dallas (2011–16)			
Colombia	Jaime Castrillón	Puerto Nare, Colombia	Colorado (2012–13)			
Colombia	**Brayan Ceballos**	Cali, Colombia	**Montréal** (2026–present)	New England (2025–26)		
Colombia	**Diego Chará**	Cali, Colombia	**Portland** (2011–present)			
Colombia	Yimmi Chará	Cali, Colombia	Portland (2020–23)			
Colombia	Alex Comas	Barranquilla, Colombia	MetroStars (2000–01)			
Colombia	Wilman Conde	Cali, Colombia	New York Red Bulls (2012)	Chicago (2007–10)		
Colombia	José Erick Correa	Acandí, Colombia	Chivas USA (2012–13)			
Colombia	Daniel Cruz	Cali, Colombia	Dallas (2011)			
Colombia	Yamith Cuesta	Turbo, Colombia	Chicago (2011)	Chivas USA (2009–10)		
Colombia	Cristian Dájome	Bogotá, Colombia	D.C. United (2023–24)	Vancouver (2020–23)		
Colombia	Antony de Ávila	Santa Marta, Colombia	MetroStars (1996–97)			
Colombia	**Jefferson Díaz**	San Andrés, Colombia	**Minnesota** (2024–present)			
Colombia	Jhon Durán	Zaragoza, Colombia	Chicago (2022)			
Colombia	Oscar Echeverry	Cali, Colombia	New York Red Bulls (2008)			
Colombia	Andrés Escobar	Puerto Tejada, Colombia	Dallas (2014)			
Colombia	Pablo Escobar	Florida, Colombia	Kansas City (2010)			
Colombia	David Ferreira	Santa Marta, Colombia	Dallas (2009–13)			
Colombia	**Jimer Fory**	Santander de Quilichao, Colombia	**Portland** (2025–present)			
Colombia	**Carlos Garcés**	López de Micay, Colombia	**LA Galaxy** (2024–present)			
Colombia	Mender García	Tumaco, Colombia	Minnesota (2022–23)			
Colombia	Olmes García	Barranquilla, Colombia	Salt Lake (2013–16)			
Colombia	Andrés Gómez	Quibdó, Colombia	Salt Lake (2023–24)			
Colombia	**Yeimar Gómez**	Tadó, Colombia	**Seattle** (2020–present)			
Colombia	Juan Diego González	Medellín, Colombia	Philadelphia (2010)			
Colombia	**Mauricio González**		**Minnesota** (2026–present)			
Colombia	Yony González	Medellín, Colombia	LA Galaxy (2020)			
Colombia	Hárrison Henao	Bello, Colombia	Colorado (2012)			
Colombia	Cucho Hernández	Pereira, Colombia	Columbus (2022–24)			
Colombia	Rubén Darío Hernández	Armenia, Colombia	MetroStars (1996)			
Colombia	Sergio Herrera	Barrancabermeja, Colombia	Columbus (2010)			
Colombia	Cristian Higuita	Cali, Colombia	Orlando (2015–19)			
Colombia	Marino Hinestroza	Cali, Colombia	Columbus (2024)			
Colombia	Jhon Kennedy Hurtado	Palmira, Colombia	Chivas USA (2014)	Seattle (2009–13), Chicago (2014)		
Colombia	Carlos Lizarazo	Cali, Colombia	Dallas (2016)			
Colombia	John Lozano	Guacarí, Colombia	New England (2012)			
Colombia	Christian Mafla	Palmira, Colombia	New England (2021)			
Colombia	Mauro Manotas	Sabanalarga, Colombia	Houston (2015–20)			
Colombia	**Alexis Manyoma**	Puerto Tejada, Colombia	**Colorado** (2025–present)			
Colombia	**Geiner Martínez**		**Philadelphia** (2026–present)			
Colombia	Gonzalo Martínez	Candelaria, Colombia	D.C. United (2008)			
Colombia	Jimmy Medranda	Mosquera, Colombia	Columbus (2023)	Kansas City (2013–19), Nashville (2020), Seattle (2020–22)		
Colombia	Jefferson Mena	Apartado, Colombia	New York City FC (2015–16)			
Colombia	Stiven Mendoza	Palmira, Colombia	New York City FC (2016)			
Colombia	Germán Mera	Cali, Colombia	Colorado (2013)			
Colombia	**Juan José Mina**	Guachené, Colombia	**New York Red Bulls** (2026–)			
Colombia	Faryd Mondragón	Cali, Colombia	Philadelphia (2011)			
Colombia	Miguel Montaño	Palmira, Colombia	Montreal (2011–12)	Seattle (2010–11)		
Colombia	Fredy Montero	Campo de la Cruz, Colombia	Seattle (2009–12, 2017, 2021–23)	Vancouver (2019–20)		
Colombia	Pepe Moreno	Santander de Quilichao, Colombia	New England (2012)			
Colombia	**Santiago Moreno**	Cali, Colombia	**Dallas** (2026–)	Portland (2021–25)		
Colombia	Tressor Moreno	Riosucio, Colombia	San Jose (2012)			
Colombia	Edwin Mosquera	Quibdó, Colombia	Atlanta (2022–25)			
Colombia	Hanyer Mosquera	Istmina, Colombia	Portland (2012)			
Colombia	**Juan Mosquera**	Cali, Colombia	**Portland** (2022–present)			
Colombia	**Moisés Mosquera**	Medellín, Colombia	**Kansas City** (2026–present)			
Colombia	Santiago Mosquera	Buenaventura, Colombia	Dallas (2018–20)			
Colombia	Yerson Mosquera	Apartadó, Colombia	Cincinnati (2023)			
Colombia	José Mulato	Cali, Colombia	Dallas (2023)			
Colombia	Luis Muriel	Santo Tomás, Colombia	Orlando (2024–25)			
Colombia	Jesús Murillo	Cali, Colombia	Los Angeles FC (2020–24)			
Colombia	Cristian Nazarit	Villarrica, Colombia	Chicago (2011)			
Colombia	Jáder Obrian	María La Baja, Colombia	Austin (2024–25)	Dallas (2021–23)		
Colombia	**Édier Ocampo**	Tumaco, Colombia	**Vancouver** (2024–present)			
Colombia	Jámison Olave	Medellín, Colombia	Salt Lake (2008–12, 2015–16)	New York Red Bulls (2013–14)		
Colombia	Juan Esteban Ortiz	Medellín, Colombia	Dallas (2016)			
Colombia	**Pablo Ortiz**	Tumaco, Colombia	**Houston** (2025–present)			
Colombia	Lionard Pajoy	Villa del Rosario, Colombia	D.C. United (2012–13)	Philadelphia (2012)		
Colombia	**Nelson Palacio**	Apartadó, Colombia	**Salt Lake** (2023–present)			
Colombia	Arley Palacios	Chigorodó, Colombia	Miami Fusion (1999)	MetroStars (1998–99)		
Colombia	**Jeisson Palacios**	Carepa, Colombia	**Nashville** (2025–present)			
Colombia	Óscar Pareja	Medellín, Colombia	Dallas (1998–05)	New England (1998)		
Colombia	Santiago Patiño	Medellín, Colombia	Orlando (2019–20)			
Colombia	Luis Perea	Medellín, Colombia	Dallas (2012)			
Colombia	John Wilmar Pérez	Medellín, Colombia	Columbus (2000–02)			
Colombia	Jorge Perlaza	Guapi, Colombia	Philadelphia (2012)	Portland (2011–12)		
Colombia	Hernán Pertúz	Barranquilla, Colombia	Dallas (2012)			
Colombia	**Alejandro Piedrahita**	Cartago, Colombia	**Toronto** (2026–present)			
Colombia	**Nelson Quiñónes**	Tumaco, Colombia	**Houston** (2022–23, 2025–present)			
Colombia	Darwin Quintero	Tumaco, Colombia	Houston (2020–22)	Minnesota (2018–19)		
Colombia	Wálter Restrepo	San Diego, US	Philadelphia (2016)			
Colombia	Andrés Reyes	Puerto Tejada, Colombia	San Diego (2025)	Inter Miami (2020), New York Red Bulls (2021–24)		
Colombia	Andrés Ricaurte	Medellín, Colombia	Dallas (2020–21)			
Colombia	Carlos Rivas	Jamundí, Colombia	New York Red Bulls (2018–19)	Orlando (2015–17)		
Colombia	Nelson Rivas	Pradera, Colombia	Montreal (2012)			
Colombia	Rafael Robayo	Bogotá, Colombia	Chicago (2012)			
Colombia	Ángelo Rodríguez	San Andrés Island, Colombia	Minnesota (2018–19)			
Colombia	Emerson Rodríguez	Buenaventura, Colombia	Inter Miami (2022)			
Colombia	James Rodríguez	Cúcuta, Colombia	Minnesota (2026)			
Colombia	Milton Rodríguez	Cali, Colombia	Dallas (2010–11)			
Colombia	Nicolás Rodríguez	San José del Guaviare, Colombia	Orlando (2025)			
Colombia	Jhohan Romaña	Apartadó, Colombia	Austin (2021–22)			
Colombia	Daniel Rosero	Bogotá, Colombia	Kansas City (2023–25)			
Colombia	**Eddie Segura**	Pereira, Colombia	**Los Angeles FC** (2019–22, 2024–present)			
Colombia	Diego Serna	Medellín, Colombia	Colorado (2005)	Miami Fusion (1998–01), MetroStars (2002), New England (2002–03), LA Galaxy (2003)		
Colombia	Carlos Terán	Turbo, Colombia	Chicago (2020–25)			
Colombia	Juan Toja	Bogotá, Colombia	New England (2012–13)	Dallas (2007–08)		
Colombia	Róger Torres	Barrancabermeja, Colombia	Philadelphia (2010–13)			
Colombia	John Jairo Tréllez	Turbo, Colombia	Dallas (1999)			
Colombia	Iván Trujillo	Santander de Quilichao, Colombia	Kansas City (2008)			
Colombia	Carlos Valderrama	Santa Marta, Colombia	Colorado (2001–02)	Tampa Bay (1996–97, 1999–01), Miami Fusion (1997–99)		
Colombia	Carlos Valdés	Cali, Colombia	Philadelphia (2011–12, 2014)			
Colombia	Adolfo Valencia	Buenaventura, Colombia	MetroStars (2000–01)			
Colombia	Jhojan Valencia	Cali, Colombia	Austin (2022–24)			
Colombia	John Valencia	Medellín, Colombia	Chivas USA (2012)			
Colombia	José Adolfo Valencia	Bogotá, Colombia	Portland (2013)			
Colombia	Kerwin Vargas	Concordia, Colombia	Charlotte (2022–26)			
Colombia	Sebastián Velásquez	Medellín, Colombia	New York City FC (2015)	Salt Lake (2012–14)		
Colombia	**Brayan Vera**	San Luis, Colombia	**Montréal** (2026–present)	Salt Lake (2023–25)		
Colombia	Henry Zambrano	Soledad, Colombia	D.C. United (2002)	MetroStars (1999), Colorado (2000)		
Colombia	Luis Zapata	Cali, Colombia	Colorado (2012)			
Ecuador	Jordy Alcívar	Manta, Ecuador	Charlotte (2022)			
Ecuador	Alexander Alvarado	Quevedo, Ecuador	Orlando (2020–21)			
Ecuador	Juan Luis Anangonó	Ibarra, Ecuador	Chicago (2013–14)			
Ecuador	Marco Angulo	Esmeraldas, Ecuador	Cincinnati (2023)			
Ecuador	Xavier Arreaga	Guayaquil, Ecuador	New England (2024)	Seattle (2019–24)		
Ecuador	Dixon Arroyo	Guayaquil, Ecuador	Inter Miami (2023)			
Ecuador	Luis Bolaños	Quito, Ecuador	Chivas USA (2014)			
Ecuador	Miller Bolaños	Esmeraldas, Ecuador	Chivas USA (2012–13)			
Ecuador	Félix Borja	San Lorenzo, Ecuador	Chivas USA (2014)			
Ecuador	**Bruno Caicedo**	Esmeraldas Province, Ecuador	**Vancouver** (2026–present)			
Ecuador	**Fricio Caicedo**		**Inter Miami** (2026–present)			
Ecuador	Diego Calderón	Quito, Ecuador	Colorado (2013)			
Ecuador	**Leonardo Campana**	Guayaquil, Ecuador	**New England** (2025–present)	Inter Miami (2022–24)		
Ecuador	**José Cifuentes**	Esmeraldas, Ecuador	**Toronto** (2025–present)	Los Angeles FC (2020–23)		
Ecuador	Washington Corozo	Guayaquil, Ecuador	Austin (2022)			
Ecuador	**Patrickson Delgado**	Ibarra, Ecuador	**Dallas** (2024–present)			
Ecuador	Jhon Espinoza	Guayaquil, Ecuador	Chicago (2021–22)			
Ecuador	Michael Estrada	Guayaquil, Ecuador	D.C. United (2022)			
Ecuador	Víctor Estupiñán	Quinindé, Ecuador	Chivas USA (2011)			
Ecuador	Alan Franco	Jujan, Ecuador	Charlotte (2022)			
Ecuador	Ariel Graziani	Empalme Villa Constitución, Ecuador	San Jose (2002)	New England (1998), Dallas (1999, 2000–2001)		
Ecuador	Carlos Gruezo	Santo Domingo, Ecuador	San Jose (2023–24)	Dallas (2016–19)		
Ecuador	Eduardo Hurtado	Esmeraldas, Ecuador	New England (2000)	LA Galaxy (1996–98), MetroStars (1998–99)		
Ecuador	Romario Ibarra	Atuntaqui, Ecuador	Minnesota (2018–19)			
Ecuador	**Anderson Julio**	Pimampiro, Ecuador	**Dallas** (2025–present)	Salt Lake (2021–24)		
Ecuador	Fausto Klinger		MetroStars (2001)			
Ecuador	Martin Klinger	Cuenca, Ecuador	MetroStars (2001)			
Ecuador	Sebas Méndez	Mira, Ecuador	Los Angeles FC (2022)	Orlando (2019–22)		
Ecuador	Roberto Miña	Guayaquil, Ecuador	Dallas (2006–07)			
Ecuador	Oswaldo Minda	Pasaje, Ecuador	Chivas USA (2012–14)			
Ecuador	Allen Obando	Quito, Ecuador	Inter Miami (2025)			
Ecuador	**Joao Ortiz**	Esmeraldas, Ecuador	**Portland** (2025–present)			
Ecuador	Diego Palacios	Guayaquil, Ecuador	Los Angeles FC (2019–23)			
Ecuador	Cristian Penilla	Esmeraldas, Ecuador	New England (2018–20)			
Ecuador	Joao Plata	Guayaquil, Ecuador	Salt Lake (2013–19)	Toronto (2011–2012)		
Ecuador	Joshué Quiñónez	Guayaquil, Ecuador	Dallas (2022)			
Ecuador	**Bryan Ramírez**		**Cincinnati** (2026–present)			
Ecuador	Wellington Sánchez	Ambato, Ecuador	LA Galaxy (1998)	MetroStars (1998)		
Ecuador	Gustavo Vallecilla	Esmeraldas, Ecuador	Columbus (2023)	Cincinnati (2021–22), Colorado (2022–23)		
Ecuador	Jefferson Valverde	Guayaquil, Ecuador	Houston (2024)			
Ecuador	**Sergio Vásquez**		**Los Angeles FC** (2026–present)			
Ecuador	Pedro Vite	Babahoyo, Ecuador	Vancouver (2022–25)			
Ecuador	Edmundo Zura	Pimampiro, Ecuador	San Jose (2011)			
Paraguay	**Miguel Almirón**	San Pablo, Paraguay	**Atlanta** (2017–18, 2025–present)			
Paraguay	**Júnior Alonso**	Asunción, Paraguay	**Atlanta** (2026–present)			
Paraguay	Luis Amarilla	Asunción, Paraguay	Minnesota (2020, 2022–23)			
Paraguay	Pedro Báez	Areguá, Paraguay	Salt Lake (2016)			
Paraguay	Alan Benítez	San Estanislao, Paraguay	Minnesota (2022)			
Paraguay	Cristian Colmán	San Cosme y Damián, Paraguay	Dallas (2017–18)			
Paraguay	Josué Colmán	Asunción, Paraguay	Orlando (2018–19)			
Paraguay	Carlos Coronel	Porto Murtinho, Brazil	New York Red Bulls (2021–25)	Philadelphia (2019)		
Paraguay	**Andrés Cubas**	Aristóbulo del Valle, Argentina	**Vancouver** (2022–present)		Capped for Argentina's national U20 football team	
Paraguay	Cecilio Domínguez	Asunción, Paraguay	Austin (2021–22)			
Paraguay	Sebastián Ferreira	Asunción, Paraguay	Houston (2022–24)			
Paraguay	Gilberto Flores	Asunción, Paraguay	Cincinnati (2025–26)			
Paraguay	Iván Franco	Ybycuí, Paraguay	Houston (2023)			
Paraguay	**Matías Galarza**	Asunción, Paraguay	**Inter Miami** (2026–present)	Atlanta (2026)		
Paraguay	Gastón Giménez	Formosa, Argentina	Chicago (2020–24)		Capped for the Argentina national football team	
Paraguay	Diego Gómez	San Juan Bautista, Paraguay	Inter Miami (2023–24)			
Paraguay	Kaku	Ciudadela, Argentina	New York Red Bulls (2018–20)		Capped for Argentina's national U20 football team	
Paraguay	Jerry Laterza	Los Angeles, US	LA Galaxy (1997)			
Paraguay	Erik López	Asunción, Paraguay	Atlanta (2021, 2023)			
Paraguay	Líder Mármol	Juan León Mallorquín, Paraguay	Chicago (2008)			
Paraguay	**David Martínez**	Buenos Aires, Argentina	**Inter Miami** (2024–present)		Capped for Argentina's national U17 football team	
Paraguay	Jesús Medina	Asunción, Paraguay	New York City FC (2018–21)			
Paraguay	Jorge Moreira	Villarrica, Paraguay	Portland (2019–20)			
Paraguay	**Braian Ojeda**	Itauguá, Paraguay	**Orlando** (2026–present)	Salt Lake (2022–23)		
Paraguay	Cristhian Paredes	Yaguarón, Paraguay	Portland (2018–25)			
Paraguay	Rodney Redes	La Colmena, Paraguay	Austin (2021–23)			
Paraguay	Matías Rojas	Asunción, Paraguay	Portland (2025)	Inter Miami (2024)		
Paraguay	Nelson Valdez	San Joaquín, Paraguay	Seattle (2015–16)			
Paraguay	Héctor Villalba	Buenos Aires, Argentina	Atlanta (2017–19)			
Peru	Luis Abram	Lima, Peru	Atlanta (2023–25)			
Peru	José Alegría	Lima, Peru	D.C. United (2001–03)			
Peru	Miguel Araujo	Villa María del Triunfo, Peru	Portland (2023–24)			
Peru	Carlos Ascues	Caracas, Venezuela	Orlando (2018–19)			
Peru	**Kenji Cabrera**	Shiga, Japan	**Vancouver** (2025–present)			
Peru	Alexander Callens	Callao, Peru	New York City FC (2017–22)			
Peru	**Wilder Cartagena**	El Carmen, Peru	**Orlando** (2022–24, 2026–present)			
Peru	José Carvallo	Lima, Peru	D.C. United (2008)			
Peru	Carlo Chueca	Lima, Peru	Chivas USA (2013)			
Peru	César Pizarro	Chiclayo, Peru	San Jose (2012)			
Peru	Collin Fernandez	Hinsdale, US	Chicago (2015–16)		Capped for the US men's national U18 and U20 soccer teams	
Peru	Raúl Fernández	Lima, Peru	Dallas (2013–14)			
Peru	Edison Flores	Comas, Peru	D.C. United (2020–22)			
Peru	Pedro Gallese	Lima, Peru	Orlando (2020–25)			
Peru	Alexi Gómez	Callao, Peru	Minnesota (2018)			
Peru	Marcos López	La Esperanza, Peru	San Jose (2019–22)			
Peru	Andrés Mendoza	Chincha Alta, Peru	Columbus (2010–11)			
Peru	Percy Olivares	Lima, Peru	Dallas (2002)			
Peru	Andy Polo	Lima, Peru	Portland (2018–21)			
Peru	Yordy Reyna	Chiclayo, Peru	Charlotte (2022)	Vancouver (2017–20), D.C. United (2020–21)		
Peru	Raúl Ruidíaz	Villa María del Triunfo, Peru	Seattle (2018–24)			
Peru	Waldir Sáenz	Lima, Peru	Colorado (1998)			
Peru	Jerry Tamashiro	Lima, Peru	Miami Fusion (1998)			
Peru	Miguel Trauco	Tarapoto, Peru	San Jose (2022–23)			
Peru	Walter Vílchez	Chiclayo, Peru	Chivas USA (2013)			
Peru	Yoshimar Yotún	Callao, Peru	Orlando (2017–18)			
Uruguay	Nicolás Acevedo	Montevideo, Uruguay	New York City FC (2020–22)			
Uruguay	José Aja	Montevideo, Uruguay	Minnesota (2020)	Orlando (2016–17), Vancouver (2018)		
Uruguay	**Mauricio Amaro**		**Atlanta** (2026–present)			
Uruguay	César Araújo	Cerrito, Uruguay	Orlando (2022–25)			
Uruguay	Joaquín Ardaiz	Salto, Uruguay	Vancouver (2019)			
Uruguay	Egidio Arévalo	Paysandú, Uruguay	Chicago (2013)			
Uruguay	Jorge Bava	Montevideo, Uruguay	Chicago (2017)			
Uruguay	Rodrigo Brasesco	Montevideo, Uruguay	D.C. United (2011)			
Uruguay	Gastón Brugman	Rosario, Uruguay	Nashville (2025)	LA Galaxy (2022–24)		
Uruguay	Martín Cáceres	Montevideo, Uruguay	LA Galaxy (2022–24)			
Uruguay	José Cancela	Santa Lucía, Uruguay	Colorado (2007)	New England (2003–06)		
Uruguay	Felipe Carballo	Montevideo, Uruguay	Portland (2025)	New York Red Bulls (2024–25)		
Uruguay	Paolo Cardozo	Montevideo, Uruguay	Chivas USA (2012)	LA Galaxy (2011–12)		
Uruguay	Manuel Castro	Durazno, Uruguay	Atlanta (2020)			
Uruguay	Thomás Chacón	Palmitas, Uruguay	Minnesota (2019–20)			
Uruguay	Diego Cháves	Montevideo, Uruguay	Chicago (2011)			
Uruguay	Matías Cóccaro	Pirarajá, Uruguay	Montréal (2024)			
Uruguay	Guzmán Corujo	Rodríguez, Uruguay	Charlotte (2022–23)			
Uruguay	**Bruno Damiani**	Montevideo, Uruguay	**Philadelphia** (2025–present)			
Uruguay	**Diego Fagúndez**	Montevideo, Uruguay	**New England** (2011–20, 2026–present)	Austin (2021–23), LA Galaxy (2023–25)		
Uruguay	**Maximiliano Falcón**	Paysandú, Uruguay	**Inter Miami** (2025–present)			
Uruguay	Álvaro Fernández	Villa Soriano, Uruguay	Chicago (2016–17)	Seattle (2010–12)		
Uruguay	Sebastián Fernández	Montevideo, Uruguay	Vancouver (2014)			
Uruguay	Francisco Ginella	Montevideo, Uruguay	Los Angeles FC (2020–22)			
Uruguay	Santiago González	Montevideo, Uruguay	Montreal (2014)			
Uruguay	**Mathías Laborda**	Fray Bentos, Uruguay	**Vancouver** (2023–present)			
Uruguay	Nicolás Lodeiro	Paysandú, Uruguay	Houston (2025)	Seattle (2016–23), Orlando (2024–25)		
Uruguay	Alex Martínez	Montevideo, Uruguay	Kansas City (2014)			
Uruguay	Enzo Martínez	Montevideo, Uruguay	Colorado (2018)			
Uruguay	Nicolás Mezquida	Paysandú, Uruguay	Colorado (2019–22)	Vancouver (2014–18)		
Uruguay	Lucas Monzón	Jaguarão, Brazil	New York Red Bulls (2021–22)			
Uruguay	Martín Morales	Montevideo, Uruguay	Colorado (2005)			
Uruguay	Cristian Olivera	Montevideo, Uruguay	Los Angeles FC (2023–24)			
Uruguay	Adrián Paz	Montevideo, Uruguay	Colorado (1997–98)	Columbus (1996)		
Uruguay	Mauricio Pereyra	Montevideo, Uruguay	Orlando (2019–23)			
Uruguay	Rodrigo Piñeiro	Montevideo, Uruguay	Nashville (2021)			
Uruguay	Pablo Pintos	Montevideo, Uruguay	San Jose (2014)			
Uruguay	Diego Polenta	Montevideo, Uruguay	LA Galaxy (2019)			
Uruguay	Gastón Puerari	Paysandú, Uruguay	Chicago (2011)			
Uruguay	Federico Puppo	Colonia del Sacramento, Uruguay	Chicago (2012)			
Uruguay	Yeferson Quintana	Bella Unión, Uruguay	San Jose (2018)			
Uruguay	Octavio Rivero	Treinta y Tres, Uruguay	Vancouver (2015–16)			
Uruguay	Brian Rodríguez	Tranqueras, Uruguay	Los Angeles FC (2019–22)			
Uruguay	Diego Rodríguez	Montevideo, Uruguay	Vancouver (2015)			
Uruguay	**Jonathan Rodríguez**	Florida, Uruguay	**Portland** (2024–present)			
Uruguay	**Santiago Rodríguez**	Montevideo, Uruguay	**Columbus** (2026–present)	New York City FC (2021–24)		
Uruguay	Washington Rodríguez	Montevideo, Uruguay	Dallas (1996)			
Uruguay	Diego Rossi	Montevideo, Uruguay	Columbus (2023–26)	Los Angeles FC (2018–21)		
Uruguay	**Juan Manuel Sanabria**	Florida, Uruguay	**Salt Lake** (2026–present)			
Uruguay	**Lucas Sanabria**	Florida, Uruguay	**LA Galaxy** (2025–present)			
Uruguay	Vicente Sánchez	Montevideo, Uruguay	Houston (2017)	Colorado (2013–15)		
Uruguay	**Marcelo Saracchi**	Paysandú, Uruguay	**Houston** (2026–present)			
Uruguay	Marcelo Silva	Mercedes, Uruguay	Salt Lake (2017–24)			
Uruguay	Alejandro Silva	Montevideo, Uruguay	Montreal (2018)			
Uruguay	Joaquín Sosa	Fray Bentos, Uruguay	Montréal (2024)			
Uruguay	**Luis Suárez**	Salto, Uruguay	**Inter Miami** (2024–present)			
Uruguay	Cristian Techera	Paysandú, Uruguay	Vancouver (2015–18)			
Uruguay	David Texeira	Salto, Uruguay	Dallas (2014–15)			
Uruguay	**Facundo Torres**	Montevideo, Uruguay	**Austin** (2026–present)	Orlando (2022–24)		
Uruguay	**Joaquín Valiente**	Colonia Valdense, Uruguay	**Dallas** (2026–present)			
Uruguay	Agustín Viana	Chicago, US	Columbus (2013–14)			
Uruguay	Diego Viera	Montevideo, Uruguay	Tampa Bay (1996)			
Venezuela	Bernardo Añor	Caracas, Venezuela	Kansas City (2015)	Columbus (2011–14)		
Venezuela	Fernando Aristeguieta	Caracas, Venezuela	Philadelphia (2015)			
Venezuela	Anthony Blondell	Cumaná, Venezuela	Vancouver (2018)			
Venezuela	Pablo Bonilla	Acarigua, Venezuela	Portland (2020–23)			
Venezuela	**Jesús Bueno**	Barquisimeto, Venezuela	**Philadelphia** (2021–present)			
Venezuela	Jhonder Cádiz	Caracas, Venezuela	Nashville (2020–21)			
Venezuela	**Gustavo Caraballo**	Valencia, Venezuela	**Orlando** (2026–present)			
Venezuela	**Wikelman Carmona**	Valle de la Pascua, Venezuela	**Montréal** (2026–present)	New York Red Bulls (2021–26)		
Venezuela	Cristian Cásseres Jr.	Caracas, Venezuela	New York Red Bulls (2018–23)			
Venezuela	Carlos Cermeño	Maturín, Venezuela	Dallas (2017)			
Venezuela	Gabriel Cichero	Caracas, Venezuela	New York Red Bulls (2008)			
Venezuela	**Sergio Córdova**	Calabozo, Venezuela	**St. Louis** (2026–present)	Salt Lake (2022), Vancouver (2023)		
Venezuela	**Ender Echenique**	Maracay, Venezuela	**Cincinnati** (2025–present)			
Venezuela	Rolf Feltscher	Bülach, Switzerland	LA Galaxy (2018–20)		Capped for Switzerland's national U16, U17, U19, U20 and U21 football teams	
Venezuela	Alejandro Fuenmayor	Maracaibo, Venezuela	Houston (2018–21)			
Venezuela	Erickson Gallardo	Barines, Venezuela	Toronto (2019–20)			
Venezuela	Luis González	Cariaco, Venezuela	Dallas (2017)			
Venezuela	José Hernández	Caracas, Venezuela	Atlanta (2018)			
Venezuela	**Ronald Hernández**	Barinas, Venezuela	**Portland** (2026–present)	Atlanta (2021–26)		
Venezuela	Yangel Herrera	La Guaira, Venezuela	New York City FC (2017–18)			
Venezuela	Kevin Kelsy	Valencia, Venezuela	Portland (2025–26)	Cincinnati (2024)		
Venezuela	Christian Makoun	Valencia, Venezuela	New England (2022–23)	Inter Miami (2020–21), Charlotte (2022)		
Venezuela	Giancarlo Maldonado	Caracas, Venezuela	Chivas USA (2010)			
Venezuela	David Martínez	El Tigre, Venezuela	Los Angeles FC (2024–26)			
Venezuela	**José Andrés Martínez**	Maracaibo, Venezuela	**Cincinnati** (2026–present)	Philadelphia (2020–24)		
Venezuela	**Josef Martínez**	Valencia, Venezuela	**Columbus** (2026–present)	Atlanta (2017–22), Inter Miami (2023), Montréal (2024), San Jose (2025)		
Venezuela	Alejandro Moreno	Barquisimeto, Venezuela	Chivas USA (2011–12)	LA Galaxy (2002–04), San Jose (2005), Houston (2006–07), Columbus (2007–09), Philadelphia (2010)		
Venezuela	Júnior Moreno	San Cristóbal, Venezuela	Houston (2024)	D.C. United (2018–21), Cincinnati (2022–23)		
Venezuela	Alberto Munoz	Maracaibo, Venezuela	Tampa Bay (2001)			
Venezuela	**Miguel Navarro**	Maracaibo, Venezuela	**Colorado** (2026–present)	Chicago (2020–23)		
Venezuela	**Javier Otero**	Cumaná, Venezuela	**Orlando** (2024–present)			
Venezuela	Ronaldo Peña	Acarigua, Venezuela	Houston (2018–20)			
Venezuela	**Daniel Pereira**	Caracas, Venezuela	**Montréal** (2026–)	Austin (2021–26)		
Venezuela	Jeizon Ramírez	San Cristóbal, Venezuela	Salt Lake (2020)			
Venezuela	Emilio Rentería	Caracas, Venezuela	Columbus (2009–12)			
Venezuela	Gelmin Rivas	Cumaná, Venezuela	D.C. United (2020)			
Venezuela	Angel Rivillo	Toulouse, France	Dallas (2000)			
Venezuela	Jorge Rojas	Mérida, Venezuela	New York Red Bulls (2008–09)			
Venezuela	Rafael Romo	Turén, Venezuela	D.C. United (2022)			
Venezuela	Giovanni Savarese	Caracas, Venezuela	San Jose (2000)	MetroStars (1996–99), New England (1999)		
Venezuela	Jefferson Savarino	Maracaibo, Venezuela	Salt Lake (2017–19, 2022–23)			
Venezuela	**Telasco Segovia**	Barquisimeto, Venezuela	**Inter Miami** (2025–present)			
Venezuela	**Giovanny Sequera**		**Philadelphia** (2026–present)			
Venezuela	Eduardo Sosa	Barinas, Venezuela	Columbus (2018)			
Venezuela	Yeferson Soteldo	Acarigua, Venezuela	Toronto (2021)			
Venezuela	Freddy Vargas	Barquisimento, Venezuela	Dallas (2021)			
Venezuela	Renzo Zambrano	Aragua de Maturín, Venezuela	Portland (2019–21)			

== Oceania (OFC) ==
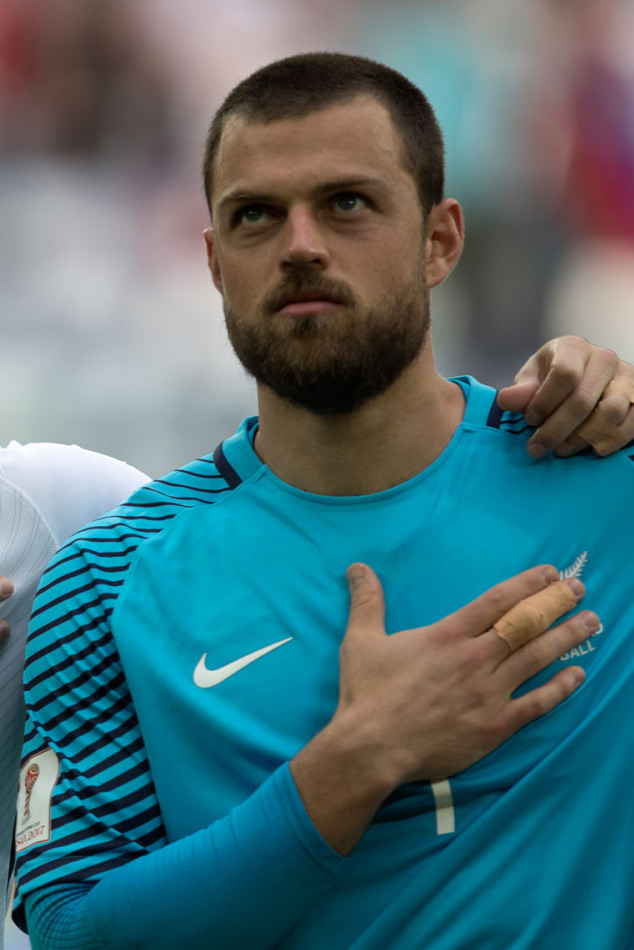
Stefan Marinovic

Country	Name	Birthplace	Most recent MLS team	Former MLS team(s)	Notes	Refs
New Zealand	Noah Billingsley	Wellington, New Zealand	Minnesota (2020)			
New Zealand	**Michael Boxall**	Auckland, New Zealand	**Minnesota** (2017–present)	Vancouver (2011)		
New Zealand	Andrew Boyens	Napier, New Zealand	LA Galaxy (2012)	Toronto (2007–08), New York Red Bulls (2008–09), Chivas USA (2011)		
New Zealand	Jeremy Brockie	Nelson, New Zealand	Toronto (2013)			
New Zealand	Elliot Collier	Hamilton, New Zealand	Chicago (2018, 2020–21)			
New Zealand	Kip Colvey	Lihue, US	Colorado (2018)	San Jose (2016)		
New Zealand	Simon Elliott	Wellington, New Zealand	Chivas USA (2011)	LA Galaxy (1999–03), Columbus (2004–05), San Jose (2009)		
New Zealand	Jake Gleeson	Palmerston North, New Zealand	Portland (2011, 2016–18)			
New Zealand	Jay Herdman	Invercargill, New Zealand	Vancouver Whitecaps (2024)		Capped for Canada's men's national U20 soccer team	
New Zealand	Dan Keat	Barnstaple, England	LA Galaxy (2011–12)			
New Zealand	Cameron Knowles	Auckland, New Zealand	Salt Lake (2005)			
New Zealand	Tony Lochhead	Tauranga, New Zealand	Chivas USA (2014)	New England (2006)		
New Zealand	Stefan Marinovic	Auckland, New Zealand	Vancouver (2017–18)			
New Zealand	James Musa	Plymouth, England	Minnesota (2020)	Kansas City (2017)		
New Zealand	Ryan Nelsen	Christchurch, New Zealand	D.C. United (2001–04)			
New Zealand	Duncan Oughton	Karori, New Zealand	Columbus (2001–04, 2006–10)			
New Zealand	**Troy Putt**		**Minnesota** (2026–present)			
New Zealand	Winston Reid	North Shore, New Zealand	Kansas City (2020)		Capped for Denmark's national U19, U20 and U21 football teams	
New Zealand	Jarrod Smith	Havelock North, New Zealand	Toronto (2008)			
New Zealand	Tommy Smith	Macclesfield, England	Colorado (2018–19)		Capped for England's national U17 and U18 football teams	
New Zealand	**Finn Surman**	Cardiff, Wales	**Portland** (2024–present)			
New Zealand	Bill Tuiloma	Beach Haven, New Zealand	Charlotte (2023–25)	Portland (2018–22)		
New Zealand	Deklan Wynne	Johannesburg, South Africa	Colorado (2018–19)			

== See also ==
- MLS International Roster Slots
- List of current Major League Soccer players with national team caps
