= All-time New York Red Bulls roster =

This list comprises all players who have participated in at least one league match for the New York Red Bulls (formerly known as the MetroStars) since the team's first Major League Soccer season in 1996. Players who were on the roster but never played a first-team game are not listed; players who appeared for the team in other competitions (US Open Cup, CONCACAF Champions League, etc.) but never actually made an MLS appearance are noted at the bottom of the page.

A "†" denotes players who only appeared in a single match.

== A ==
- (Cameroon) Anatole Abang
- (United States) Tyler Adams
- (Ghana) Joe Addo
- (United States) Jeff Agoos
- (United States) Juan Agudelo
- (United States) Andre Akpan
- (United States) Nelson Akwari
- (United States) Chris Albright
- (United States) Eric Alexander
- (United States) Brandon Allen †
- (United States) Jozy Altidore
- (Mexico) Byron Alvarez
- (Colombia) Pedro Álvarez
- (United States) Mike Ammann
- (Colombia) Juan Pablo Ángel
- (United States) Kenny Arena
- (Spain) Armando
- (Colombia) Jhonny Arteaga
- (Guadeloupe) Stéphane Auvray

== B ==
- (Ghana) Gideon Baah
- (United States) Nidal Baba
- (United States) Marcelo Balboa †
- (Morocco) Mehdi Ballouchy
- (United States) Danny Barber †
- (United States) Brandon Barklage
- (South Africa) Shaun Bartlett
- (Angola) Edgar Bartolomeu
- (United States) Mersim Beskovic
- (United States) Brian Bliss
- (Uganda) Tenywa Bonseu
- (South Africa) Danleigh Borman
- (United States) Jonathan Borrajo †
- (Spain) Ruben Bover
- (New Zealand) Andrew Boyens
- (United States) Michael Bradley
- (Brazil) Branco
- (United States) Chris Brauchle
- (Costa Rica) Pablo Brenes
- (United States) Edson Buddle
- (Colombia) Michael Bustamante
- (Liberia) Michael Butler †

== C ==
- (United States) Sal Caccavale †
- (Australia) Tim Cahill
- (United States) Blake Camp
- (Scotland) Peter Canero
- (Italy) Nicola Caricola
- (Australia) David Carney
- (Spain) Albert Celades
- (United States) Danny Cepero
- (United States) Conor Chinn
- (United States) Ian Christianson
- (United States) Ted Chronopoulos
- (United States) Mark Chung
- (Venezuela) Gabriel Cichero
- (United States) Jordan Cila
- (United States) Ricardo Clark
- (United States) Braeden Cloutier
- (France) Aurélien Collin
- (Colombia) Alex Comas
- (Colombia) Wilman Conde
- (United States) Bobby Convey
- (United States) Jon Conway
- (United States) Kenny Cooper
- (United States) Ramiro Corrales
- (Senegal) Bouna Coundoul
- (Serbia) Saša Ćurčić

== D ==
- (Israel) Omer Damari
- (United States) Austin da Luz
- (Argentina) Cristian da Silva
- (United States) Nino Da Silva
- (United States) Brad Davis
- (United States) Sean Davis
- (Colombia) Antony de Ávila
- (Canada) Dwayne De Rosario
- (United States) John DeBrito
- (Senegal) Mamadou Diallo
- (United States) Joey DiGiamarino
- (Senegal) Birahim Diop
- (France) Youri Djorkaeff
- (Liberia) Francis Doe
- (Italy) Roberto Donadoni
- (United States) Thomas Dooley
- (England) Paul Dougherty
- (United States) Alec Dufty †
- (United States) Mike Duhaney
- (United States) Todd Dunivant
- (United States) Chris Duvall

== E ==
- (Colombia) Gerson Echeverry †
- (Colombia) Oscar Echeverry
- (England) Richard Eckersley
- (Argentina) Fabián Espíndola
- (Haiti) Derrick Etienne

== F ==
- (Brazil) Rodrigo Faria
- (Brazil) Felipe
- (Angola) Fernando Fernandes †
- (Brazil) Gilberto Flores
- (Argentina) Juan Forchetti
- (Liberia) Sam Forko
- (United States) Hunter Freeman

== G ==
- (Argentina) José Galván
- (Argentina) Sergio Galván Rey
- (Argentina) Walter García †
- (Puerto Rico) Bill Gaudette
- (United States) Eddie Gaven
- (United States) Ted Gillen
- (Brazil) Gilmar
- (Trinidad and Tobago) Cornell Glen
- (United States) Kevin Goldthwaite
- (Colombia) Julian Gómez
- (United States) Paul Grafer
- (United States) Taylor Graham
- (United States) Mike Grella
- (Jamaica) Winston Griffiths
- (Honduras) Amado Guevara
- (Brazil) Guido

== H ==
- (Puerto Rico) Jeremy Hall
- (United States) Rhett Harty
- (United States) Chris Henderson
- (Saint Vincent and the Grenadines) Ezra Hendrickson
- (Republic of Ireland) Ian Hennessy
- (France) Thierry Henry
- (United States) Daniel Hernández
- (Puerto Rico) Jason Hernandez
- (Colombia) Rubén Darío Hernández
- (United States) Corey Hertzog
- (United States) Ken Hesse †
- (Sweden) Markus Holgersson
- (United States) Alex Horwath †
- (United States) Tim Howard
- (Ecuador) Eduardo Hurtado
- (United States) Mirsad Huseinovic †

== I ==
- (Togo) Abbe Ibrahim
- (Ghana) Salou Ibrahim
- (France) Elie Ikangu

== J ==
- (Mexico) Diego Jiménez
- (Costa Rica) Carlos Johnson
- (United States) Rob Johnson
- (United States) Steve Jolley
- (United States) Mike Jones †
- (United States) Miles Joseph
- (Brazil) Juninho
- (Poland) Andrzej Juskowiak

== K ==
- (Belgium) Nansha Kalonji
- (United States) Brian Kamler
- (Senegal) Macoumba Kandji
- (United States) Matt Kassel
- (United States) Stephen Keel
- (United States) Brian Kelly
- (Ghana) Louis Ken-Kwofie †
- (Japan) Kosuke Kimura
- (Iran) Mohammad Khakpour
- (Ecuador) Martin Klinger
- (United States) Sacha Kljestan
- (United States) Kevin Knight
- (United States) Matt Knowles
- (United States) Chris Konopka †
- (Ukraine) Dema Kovalenko
- (United States) Leonard Krupnik
- (United States) Eric Kvello
- (United States) Mickey Kydes

== L ==
- (United States) Connor Lade
- (United States) Caesar Legea
- (United States) Manny Lagos
- (United States) Alexi Lalas
- (Haiti) Jerrod Laventure
- (Jamaica) Kemar Lawrence
- (France) Sébastien Le Toux
- (United States) Jacob LeBlanc
- (Argentina) Carlos Ledesma †
- (United States) Chris Leitch
- (United States) Stan Lembryk †
- (United States) Andrew Lewis
- (Trinidad and Tobago) Darin Lewis
- (Estonia) Joel Lindpere
- (United States) Mark Lisi
- (United States) Aaron Long
- (United States) Brent Longenecker
- (United States) Lawrence Lozzano
- (Brazil) João Luiz
- (France) Péguy Luyindula

== M ==
- (United States) Mike Magee
- (Mexico) Rafael Márquez
- (Costa Rica) Josué Martínez †
- (Brazil) Thiago Martins †
- (United States) Clint Mathis
- (Germany) Lothar Matthäus
- (Cameroon) Matthew Mbuta
- (United States) Dax McCarty
- (United States) Ryan Meara
- (Puerto Rico) Chris Megaloudis †
- (United States) Carlos Mendes
- (United States) Tony Meola
- (United States) Matt Miazga
- (Costa Rica) Roy Miller
- (Ethiopia) Dahir Mohammed
- (United States) Jeff Moore
- (United States) Amando Moreno
- (Bolivia) Jaime Moreno
- (United States) Martin Munnelly †
- (United States) Joe Munoz †
- (Panama) Michael Amir Murillo
- (United States) Alex Muyl
- (Costa Rica) Roy Myers

== N ==
- (United States) Omid Namazi †
- (Denmark) Brian Nielsen
- (United States) Mike Nugent

== O ==
- (Cameroon) Marius Obekop
- (Austria) Ernst Öbster
- (Ghana) Dominic Oduro
- (Colombia) Jámison Olave
- (United States) Danny O'Rourke
- (Canada) Karl Ouimette
- (Cameroon) Ambroise Oyongo

== P ==
- (El Salvador) Alfredo Pacheco
- (Colombia) Arley Palacios
- (Iceland) Victor Pálsson
- (United States) Jeff Parke
- (United States) Carlos Parra
- (United States) Ross Paule
- (United States) Russell Payne †
- (United States) Heath Pearce
- (Haiti) Peguero Jean Philippe
- (United States) Orlando Perez
- (France) Damien Perrinelle
- (United States) Mike Petke
- (United States) Brian Piesner †
- (Argentina) Juan Pietravallo
- (United States) Eddie Pope

== Q ==
- (United States) Santino Quaranta
- (United States) Eric Quill

== R ==
- (United States) Tab Ramos
- (United States) Ante Razov
- (United States) Tim Ream
- (United States) Tim Regan
- (United States) Andrew Restrepo
- (United States) Claudio Reyna
- (Jamaica) Dane Richards
- (United States) Travis Rinker
- (Canada) Marco Rizi †
- (Wales) Carl Robinson
- (United States) Luis Robles
- (England) Luke Rodgers
- (Mexico) Edmundo Rodriguez
- (Venezuela) Jorge Rojas
- (United States) Jim Rooney
- (England) John Rooney
- (Germany) Frank Rost
- (Austria) Daniel Royer
- (United States) Tyler Ruthven

== S ==
- (Ghana) Lloyd Sam
- (United States) Manolo Sanchez
- (Ecuador) Wellington Sánchez †
- (United States) Luke Sassano
- (Venezuela) Giovanni Savarese
- (Austria) Markus Schopp
- (Uganda) Ibrahim Sekagya
- (United States) Mark Semioli
- (France) Saër Sène
- (Colombia) Diego Serna
- (United States) Steve Shak
- (United States) Dustin Sheppard
- (Brazil) Danilo Silva
- (United States) Damian Silvera
- (Bermuda) Khano Smith
- (Norway) Jan Gunnar Solli
- (Argentina) Diego Soñora
- (United States) Mike Sorber
- (United States) Seth Stammler
- (Northern Ireland) Jonny Steele
- (United States) Eric Stevenson †
- (United States) Ryan Suarez
- (Canada) Greg Sutton
- (United States) Barry Swift

== T ==
- (Finland) Teemu Tainio
- (United States) Carey Talley †
- (Jamaica) Fabian Taylor
- (United States) Tony Tchani
- (United States) Zach Thornton

== U ==
- (Bosnia and Herzegovina) Siniša Ubiparipović
- (United States) Chris Unger

== V ==
- (Bolivia) Joselito Vaca
- (Colombia) Adolfo Valencia
- (Netherlands) Dave van den Bergh
- (Chile) Marcelo Vega
- (United States) Peter Vermes
- (Argentina) Gonzalo Verón
- (United States) Joe Vide
- (Puerto Rico) Petter Villegas

== W ==
- (United States) Jonny Walker
- (United States) Anthony Wallace
- (United States) Billy Walsh
- (United States) Tim Ward
- (Netherlands) Ronald Waterreus
- (United States) Cordt Weinstein
- (United States) Zach Wells
- (Jamaica) Andy Williams
- (United States) Richie Williams
- (United States) John Wolyniec
- (United States) A. J. Wood
- (England) Bradley Wright-Phillips
- (England) Shaun Wright-Phillips
- (United States) Marvell Wynne

== Z ==
- (Colombia) Henry Zambrano
- (United States) Jeff Zaun
- (United States) Kerry Zavagnin
- (Jamaica) Craig Ziadie
- (United States) Nick Zimmerman
- (United States) Sal Zizzo
- (Guadeloupe) Ronald Zubar

== Miscellaneous ==
- (Brazil) Digão appeared in one MLS Cup playoff match, but never appeared in a regular season match.
- (Panama) Alex Dixon never played in a league match, but appeared in three Copa Merconorte matches.
- (United States) Irving Garcia never appeared in a league match, but appeared in Open Cup matches.
- (United States) John Gilkerson never played in a league match, but started for the first 45 minutes of an Open Cup match.
- (United States) Šaćir Hot never played in a league match, but appeared in Open Cup matches.
- (Haiti) Andrew Jean-Baptiste never played in a league match, but played 44 minutes as a substitute in an Open Cup match.
- (United States) Gordon Kljestan never appeared in a league match, but played 45 minutes as a substitute in an Open Cup match.
- (United States) Tyler Lassiter never appeared in a league match, but appeared in Open Cup matches.
- (United States) Ryan Maduro never appeared in a league match, but played 2 minutes as a substitute in an Open Cup match.
- (Brazil) Marcos Paullo never appeared in a league match, but appeared in Open Cup matches.
- (United States) David Roth never appeared in a league match, but played 27 minutes as a substitute in an Open Cup match.
- (United States) Teddy Schneider never played in a league match, but appeared in Open Cup matches.

== Sources ==
- "Metro All-Time Roster". MetroFanatic.com.
- "MLS All-Time MLS Player Register". Mlsnet.com. Major League Soccer. Archived from the original on 14 February 2009.
- "MLS Number Assignments Archive".
