= 2003 USL Pro Soccer League =

USL Pro Soccer League
- Season: 2003
- Champions: Wilmington Hammerheads (1st Title)
- Premiers: Carolina Dynamo (1st Title)
- Matches: 130
- Goals: 470 (3.62 per match)
- Best Player: (Poland) Rob Jachym Western Mass Pioneers
- Top goalscorer: (Poland) Rob Jachym Western Mass Pioneers (14 Goals)
- Best goalkeeper: (United States) Chad Sackett Utah Blitzz

== Regular season ==
=== Atlantic Region ===
Team	Pld	W	D	L	GF	GA	GD	Pts
Long Island Rough Riders	20	13	3	4	41	21	+20	42
New Jersey Stallions	20	9	2	9	36	32	+4	29
New York Freedom	20	8	6	6	30	28	+2	29 (Note: New York was penalized 1 point for use of an ineligible player in a game.)
Reading Rage	20	5	0	15	40	24	+16	15

=== Northern Region ===
Team	Pld	W	D	L	GF	GA	GD	Pts
New Hampshire Phantoms	20	11	2	7	32	22	+10	35
Westchester Flames	20	11	0	9	36	40	−4	33
Western Mass Pioneers	20	8	1	11	43	35	+8	25

=== Southern Region ===
Team	Pld	W	D	L	GF	GA	GD	Pts
Carolina Dynamo	20	14	4	2	45	16	+29	46
Wilmington Hammerheads	20	11	3	6	43	23	+20	36
Northern Virginia Royals	20	6	1	13	20	34	−14	18 (Note: Northern Virginia was penalized 1 point for use of an ineligible player in a game.)

=== Western Region ===
Team	Pld	W	D	L	GF	GA	GD	Pts
Utah Blitzz	20	12	3	5	46	20	+26	39
California Gold	20	11	3	6	39	30	+9	36
San Diego Gauchos	20	3	1	16	19	49	−30	10

== Playoffs ==
Southern Region

- Carolina 1 :: 1 Wilmington (a.e.t.)
- Wilmington 2 :: 0 Carolina

(Wilmington wins series 3-1 on aggregate)

Western Region

- California 0 :: 1 Utah

Atlantic Region

- Long Island (4) 0 :: PK :: 0 (5) New Jersey

Northern Region

- New Hampshire 0 :: 3 Westchester
- Westchester 2 :: 3 New Hampshire

(Westchester wins series 5-3 on aggregate)

Northern Region Playoffs
August 7, 2003
5:30 PM EDT
First Leg

Westchester Flames	3–0	New Hampshire Phantoms
Aboubacar Camara 12' (pen.); Costea Decu 25'; Ernest Inneh (red card) 80'; Evaud Thompson 88'	Report

City Park Stadium, New Rochelle, New York
Referee: Ken Heller
August 9, 2003
8:05 PM EDT
Second Leg

New Hampshire Phantoms	3–2	Westchester Flames
Anthony D'Angelo 4'; Dushwane Simpson 82'; Bruno Victal 90+1'	Report	9', 90+' Aboubacar Camara

Singer Family Park, Manchester, New Hampshire

Southern Region Playoffs
August 8, 2003
7:30 PM EDT
First Leg

Wilmington Hammerheads	1–1	Carolina Dynamo
Byron Carmichael 90'	Report	15' Mike Adeyemi

Legion Stadium, Wilmington, North Carolina
August 9, 2003
7:30 PM EDT
Second Leg

Carolina Dynamo	0–2	Wilmington Hammerheads
	Report	7' Graham Goulding; 90' Timothy Karalexis

Macpherson Stadium, Browns Summit, North Carolina

Wilmington won 3–1 on Aggregate.

Western Region Playoff
August 9, 2003
6:00 PM EDT

Utah Blitzz	1–0	California Gold
Shane Curran 71'	Report

Rice-Eccles Stadium, Salt Lake City, Utah

Atlantic Region Playoff
August 9, 2003
7:30 PM EDT

Long Island Rough Riders	0–0 (a.e.t.)	New Jersey Stallions
	Report
Penalties
Scott McLain (penalty missed)	4–5	(penalty scored) Vincent Scerbo

Kenneth P. LaValle Stadium, Stony Brook, New York
Attendance: 378

=== League Semifinals ===
- New Jersey (0) 3 :: PK :: 3 (3) Westchester
- Wilmington 2 :: 1 Utah
August 16, 2003
5:30 PM EDT

Westchester Flames	3–3 (a.e.t.)	New Jersey Stallions
Aboubacar Camara 2'; Ernest Inneh 7', 29'	Report	15' (pen.), 32' (pen.) Marcello Fracchia; 79' Ramón Tapia
Penalties
Costeau Decu (penalty scored); Mersim Beskovic (penalty scored); Hector Navarrete (penalty scored)	3–0	(penalty missed) Jeff Rigby

City Park Stadium, New Rochelle, New York
August 16, 2003
6:00 PM EDT

Utah Blitzz	1–2	Wilmington Hammerheads
Kiko Medina 90'	Report	10' (red card) 88' Kevin Nylen; 45' Johnnie Keen; (red card) 80' George Corrie

Rice-Eccles Stadium, Salt Lake City, Utah

=== USL-PSL Championship ===
August 23, 2003
5:00 PM EDT

Wilmington Hammerheads	2–1 (OT)	Westchester Flames
Fredy Nava-Mendez 76' (o.g.); Joey Johnson 106'	Report	37' Evaud Thompson

Legion Stadium, Wilmington, North Carolina
Attendance: 3,982
