= 2002 USL D3 Pro League =

USL D3 Pro League
- Season: 2002
- Champions: Long Island Rough Riders (1st Title)
- Regular Season title: Utah Blitzz (2nd Title)
- Matches: 180
- Goals: 628 (3.49 per match)
- Best player: (Brazil) Julio Cesar-Dos Santos New Jersey Stallions
- Top goalscorer: (Brazil) Julio Cesar-Dos Santos New Jersey Stallions (22 Goals)
- Best goalkeeper: (United States) Nathan Kipp Carolina Dynamo

Statistics of the USL D3 Pro League for the 2002 season.

== League standings ==
=== Northern Conference ===
| Pos | Team | Pld | W | L | D | GF | GA | GD | BP | Pts |
|---|---|---|---|---|---|---|---|---|---|---|
| 1 | Western Mass Pioneers | 20 | 14 | 5 | 1 | 44 | 24 | +20 | 5 | 62 |
| 2 | Connecticut Wolves | 20 | 10 | 8 | 2 | 32 | 31 | +1 | 4 | 46 |
| 3 | Westchester Flames | 20 | 7 | 10 | 3 | 22 | 29 | −7 | 3 | 34 |
| 4 | New Hampshire Phantoms | 20 | 4 | 13 | 3 | 20 | 45 | −25 | 2 | 21 |

Source: rsssf.com

=== Atlantic Conference ===
| Pos | Team | Pld | W | L | D | GF | GA | GD | BP | Pts |
|---|---|---|---|---|---|---|---|---|---|---|
| 1 | Long Island Rough Riders | 20 | 13 | 6 | 1 | 28 | 28 | 0 | 11 | 64 |
| 2 | New York Freedom | 20 | 13 | 7 | 0 | 38 | 30 | +8 | 6 | 58 |
| 3 | New Jersey Stallions | 20 | 12 | 8 | 0 | 44 | 32 | +12 | 8 | 56 |
| 4 | South Jersey Barons | 20 | 7 | 10 | 3 | 30 | 40 | −10 | 3 | 34 |
| 5 | Reading Rage | 20 | 3 | 16 | 1 | 26 | 53 | −27 | 2 | 15 |

Source: rsssf.com

=== Southern Conference ===
| Pos | Team | Pld | W | L | D | GF | GA | GD | BP | Pts |
|---|---|---|---|---|---|---|---|---|---|---|
| 1 | Wilmington Hammerheads | 20 | 14 | 4 | 2 | 58 | 25 | +33 | 11 | 69 |
| 2 | Greenville Lions | 20 | 11 | 6 | 3 | 43 | 26 | +17 | 5 | 52 |
| 3 | Carolina Dynamo | 20 | 9 | 6 | 5 | 35 | 25 | +10 | 5 | 46 |
| 4 | Northern Virginia Royals | 20 | 3 | 17 | 0 | 26 | 67 | −41 | 3 | 15 |

Source: rsssf.com

=== Western Conference ===
| Pos | Team | Pld | W | L | D | GF | GA | GD | BP | Pts |
|---|---|---|---|---|---|---|---|---|---|---|
| 1 | Utah Blitzz | 20 | 16 | 3 | 1 | 52 | 20 | +32 | 9 | 74 |
| 2 | San Diego Gauchos | 20 | 10 | 7 | 3 | 38 | 29 | +9 | 5 | 48 |
| 3 | Arizona Sahuaros | 20 | 10 | 7 | 3 | 31 | 30 | +1 | 4 | 47 |
| 4 | California Gold | 20 | 9 | 10 | 1 | 32 | 32 | 0 | 3 | 40 |
| 5 | Northern Nevada Aces | 20 | 5 | 15 | 0 | 29 | 52 | −23 | 1 | 21 |

Source: rsssf.com

== Playoffs ==
=== First Round ===
- San Diego defeated Arizona, 3-0.
- Carolina defeated Greenville, 1-0.
- Connecticut defeated Western Massachusetts 0-2, 3-2
August 7, 2002

| Greenville Lions | 0–1 | Carolina Dynamo |
|---|---|---|
| | | 70' John Samford |

Sirrine Stadium, Greenville, South Carolina

August 7, 2002

| San Diego Gauchos | 3–0 | Arizona Sahuaros |
|---|---|---|
| Ralph Dartt 59'; Herculez Gomez | Report |

Titan Stadium, Chula Vista, California

August 7, 2002
First Leg

| Connecticut Wolves | 0–2 | Western Mass Pioneers |
|---|---|---|
| Mick McDermott (yellow card) 45' (yellow-red card) 50' | Report | 30' Rob Jachym; 90+' (pen.) Paul Kelly |

Veterans Stadium, New Britain, Connecticut
Attendance: 1,568
August 10, 2002
7:30 PM EDT
Second Leg

| Western Mass Pioneers | 2–3 | Connecticut Wolves |
|---|---|---|
| Mark Manganello 40'; Paul Kelly 50' (pen.) | Report 1 Report 2 | 45' Dahir Mohammed; 48' Roger Kennedy; 89' Carlos Sousa |

Lusitano Stadium, Ludlow, Massachusetts
Attendance: 3,422

Connecticut Wolves advance win a 5–4 point difference in a Best-of-2 Series.

=== Conference Finals ===
- Long Island defeated New York 2-2 (5-4 PK)
- Wilmington defeated Carolina 2-1
- Utah defeated San Diego 1-0
August 10, 2002

| Wilmington Hammerheads | 2–1 | Carolina Dynamo |
|---|---|---|
| Tyler Hughes 48'; George Corrie 65' | Report | 73' Moaffat Oduor |

Legion Stadium, Wilmington, North Carolina
August 10, 2002

| Utah Blitzz | 1–0 (OT) | San Diego Gauchos |
|---|---|---|
| Chris Watkins 111' |

Cottonwood High School, Murray, Utah

August 11, 2002

| Long Island Rough Riders | 2–2 (a.e.t.) | New York Freedom |
|---|---|---|
| Brett Davis 20'; John Diffley 24' (o.g.) | Report | 1' Nick Christopher; Ben Hickey |
Penalties
| Billy Gatti (penalty scored); Christer Arnesen (penalty scored) | 5–4 | (penalty missed) Ben Diallo |

Mitchel Athletic Complex, Uniondale, New York

=== Semifinals ===
- Wilmington defeated Utah 3-1
- Long Island defeated Connecticut 3-0
August 17, 2002
7:30 PM EDT

| Long Island Rough Riders | 3–0 | Connecticut Wolves |
|---|---|---|
| Karim Diallo (yellow card) 20' (yellow-red card) 53'; Georges Haba 59'; Cordt Weinstein 74'; Fausto Klinger 80' (pen.) | Report | (red card) 80' J.T. Dorsey |

Mitchel Athletic Complex, Uniondale, New York
Attendance: 500
August 18, 2002
5:00 PM EDT

| Wilmington Hammerheads | 3–1 | Utah Blitzz |
|---|---|---|
| Glenn Murray 9', 45'; John Payne 29' | Report | 11' Richie Breza |

Legion Stadium, Wilmington, North Carolina

=== USL D3 Pro League Championship Game ===
August 24, 2002
8:00 PM EDT

| Wilmington Hammerheads | 1–2 | Long Island Rough Riders |
|---|---|---|
| Christopher Bagley 40' | Report | 58' Carlos Mendes; 82' Derrick Etienne |

Legion Stadium, Wilmington, North Carolina
Attendance: 5,768
- Long Island defeated Wilmington 2-1
