= 1998 MLS supplemental draft =

College draft for soccer teams

The 1998 Major League Soccer supplemental draft was held on February 1, 1998, at the Airport Hilton in Fort Lauderdale, Florida.

== Format ==
Major League Soccer held a professional player combine in Fort Lauderdale the last week of January 1998. On Saturday, January 31, 1998, the league held the first round of the 1998 MLS College Draft. The second and third rounds of the college draft concluded Sunday morning. On Sunday afternoon, February 1, 1998, the league held its supplemental draft.

== Changes from 1997 ==
- 1998 expansion teams Chicago Fire and Miami Fusion were awarded the first and second selections in each round.

== Round 1 ==
Pick #	MLS team	Player	Position	Affiliation
1	Chicago Fire	C.J. Brown	D	San Francisco Bay Seals, San Jose State University
2	Tampa Bay Mutiny (Note: #2: Miami Fusion → Tampa Bay Mutiny. 20 November 1997: Tampa Bay Mutiny acquired this first-round selection and an allocation from Miami Fusion in exchange for midfielder Carlos Valderrama.)	Brian Loftin	F	Kansas City Attack, University of Evansville
3	San Jose Clash	Tim Weaver	D	Richmond Kickers, University of San Francisco
4	Colorado Rapids (Note: #4: MetroStars → Colorado Rapids. 10 July 1997: Colorado Rapids acquired this first-round selection and future considerations from MetroStars in exchange for forward Shaun Bartlett.)	Marquis White	F	San Francisco Bay Seals, University of San Francisco
5	New England Revolution	Dahir Mohammed	D	Long Island Rough Riders, C.W. Post College
6	D.C. United (Note: #6: Los Angeles Galaxy → New England Revolution → D.C. United. Date Needed: D.C. United acquired this first-round pick from New England Revolution in exchange for a third-round selection in the 1998 MLS College Draft. On 10 March 1997, New England had acquired this first-round pick from Los Angeles Galaxy in exchange for forward Wélton. More information needed.)	Geoff Aunger	D	Seattle Sounders
7	Tampa Bay Mutiny	Brad Wilson	M	Orange County Zodiac, Cal State Fullerton
8	Kansas City Wizards	Goran Hunjak	M	Washington Warthogs
9	D.C. United (Note: #9: Columbus Crew → D.C. United. Date Needed: D.C. United acquired this first-round pick from Columbus Crew in exchange for the #12 pick in the 1999 Supplemental Draft.)	Danny Care	D	Carolina Dynamo, Clemson Tigers
10	Dallas Burn	Chris Fox	D	Buffalo Blizzard, Brown University
11	Colorado Rapids	Julio Cengarle	M	Maunabo Leones, Montclair State College
12	Columbus Crew (Note: #12: D.C. United → Columbus Crew. Date Needed: Columbus Crew acquired this first-round pick from D.C. United in exchange for the #9 pick in the 1999 Supplemental Draft.)	Brandon Ward	M	Richmond Kickers, Indiana University

== Round 2 ==
Pick #	MLS team	Player	Position	Affiliation
13	Chicago Fire	Don Gramenz	D	Minnesota Thunder, University of Wisconsin–Milwaukee
14	MetroStars (Note: #14: Miami Fusion → MetroStars. 1 February 1998: MetroStars acquired this second-round selection from Miami Fusion in exchange for a second-round pick (#19) in the 1999 MLS Supplemental Draft.)	Travis Roy	M	Detroit Rockers, University of Wisconsin–Madison
15	San Jose Clash	Kevin Rueda	GK	California Jaguars, Santa Clara University
16	Chicago Fire (Note: #16: MetroStars → Los Angeles Galaxy → Chicago Fire. Date Needed: Chicago Fire acquired this second-round selection from Los Angeles Galaxy in exchange for a third-round pick (#26) in the 1998 MLS College Draft. On 16 June 1997, Los Angeles had acquired this second-round pick from MetroStars in exchange for defender Mark Semioli.)	Paul Holocher	M	California Jaguars, Santa Clara University
17	New England Revolution	Doug Neely	M	Anaheim Splash, Chapman University
18	Los Angeles Galaxy	Cesar Alvarado	M	Valley Golden Eagles, Citrus College
19	Tampa Bay Mutiny	Steve Bell	M	Washington Warthogs, Robert Morris University
20	Kansas City Wizards	Rodney Rambo	D	Portland Pilots
21	Columbus Crew	Scott Cannon	D	Richmond Kickers, University of Evansville
22	Dallas Burn	Ernest Inneh	F	Long Island Rough Riders, Brooklyn College
23	San Jose Clash (Note: #23: Colorado Rapids → San Jose Clash. 8 January 1997: San Jose Clash acquired this second-round pick and defender Dominic Kinnear from Colorado Rapids in exchange for forward Paul Bravo and defender Rafael Amaya.)	Eddie Soto	F	Pro Beach Soccer Tour, Cal State Fullerton
24	Tampa Bay Mutiny (Note: #24: D.C. United → Tampa Bay Mutiny. 2 February 1997: Tampa Bay Mutiny acquired this second-round pick and a first-round selection (#10) in the 1997 MLS Supplemental Draft from D.C. United in exchange for the #8 pick in the 1997 Supplemental Draft.)	John Jones	M/F	Orange County Zodiac, Sacramento State

== Round 3 ==
Pick #	MLS team	Player	Position	Affiliation
25	Chicago Fire	Paul Lekics	M	Richmond Kickers, Creighton University
26	Los Angeles Galaxy (Note: #26: Miami Fusion → Los Angeles Galaxy. 1 February 1998: Los Angeles Galaxy acquired this third-round selection from Miami Fusion in exchange for a third-round pick (#34) in the 1999 MLS Supplemental Draft.)	Amos Magee	F	Minnesota Thunder, Wesleyan University
27	San Jose Clash	Alberto Montoya	M	Raleigh Flyers, Santa Clara University
28	MetroStars	Sal Leanti	D	Long Island Rough Riders, Fordham University
29	New England Revolution	Dave Salzwedel	GK	San Jose Clash, Cal Lutheran
30	Los Angeles Galaxy	Marco Ferruzzi	M	Tampa Bay Mutiny, University of North Carolina
31	Tampa Bay Mutiny	PASS		
32	Kansas City Wizards	PASS		
33	Tampa Bay Mutiny (Note: #33: Columbus Crew → Tampa Bay Mutiny. xx February 1997: Tampa Bay Mutiny acquired this third-round pick from Columbus Crew in exchange for a third-round selection (#28) in the 1997 MLS Supplemental Draft.)	PASS		
34	Dallas Burn	Darren Sawatzky	M/F	New England Revolution, University of Portland
35	Colorado Rapids	Tayt Ianni	M	San Jose Clash, UCLA
36	D.C. United	PASS		

== Unresolved 1998 Supplemental Draft Trades ==
- 3 February 1997: Colorado Rapids acquired defender Peter Vermes and a third-round pick in the 1998 Supplemental Draft from New York/New Jersey MetroStars in exchange for midfielder Kerry Zavagnin and future considerations.
- 13 November 1997: San Jose Clash acquired a third-round selection in the 1998 Supplemental Draft from Miami Fusion in exchange for forward Christopher Sullivan. Sullivan retired two weeks later.
