= Darrell Etienne =

Haitian footballer (born 1974)

Personal information
- Date of birth: 11 August 1974 (age 52)
- Place of birth: Nyack, New York, United States
- Position: Defender

College career
Years	Team	Apps	(Gls)
1995–1997	VCU Rams		

Senior career*
Years	Team	Apps	(Gls)
1998–2001	Richmond Kickers	41	(1)
2002–2006	Long Island Rough Riders	36	(0)

International career
2000	Haiti	3	(0)
- * Club domestic league appearances and goals

Darrell Etienne (born 11 August 1974) is a Haitian former professional footballer who played as a defender for the Haiti national team.

== Career ==
Etienne played several years in the USL for the Richmond Kickers and Long Island Rough Riders. In 1999, Darrell was selected to the A-League All-Star Team. With the Roughriders, he helped the team to a D-3 Pro League National Championship. He scored his first goal with the club on 25 June 2003 in a 2-1 loss to Mid Michigan Bucks in a U.S. Open Cup match.

With the Haitian National Team, he appeared in various competitions, including the Gold Cup, Caribbean Cup, and World Cup Qualifying.

== Personal ==
He is the brother of Derrick Etienne Sr. and uncle of Derrick Etienne Jr.

== Statistics ==
Club	Season	League		Total	
Club	Season	Apps	Goals	Apps	Goals
Richmond Kickers	1998	4	0	4	0
Richmond Kickers	1999	12	1	12	1
Richmond Kickers	2000	14	0	14	0
Richmond Kickers	2001	11	0	11	0
Long Island Rough Riders	2002	5	0	5	0
Long Island Rough Riders	2003	4	0	4	0
Long Island Rough Riders	2004	10	0	10	0
Long Island Rough Riders	2005	-	-	-	-
Long Island Rough Riders	2006	17	0	17	0

== Honors ==
=== Club ===
Long Island Rough Riders

- 2002 USISL D-3 Pro League
