= George Corrie =

George Corrie may refer to:

- George Corrie (footballer) (born 1973), English footballer
- George Corrie (priest) (1793–1885), English churchman and academic
