= Ramón Tapia =

Ramón Tapia may refer to:

- Ramón Tapia (boxer), Chilean boxer
- Ramón Tapia (footballer), Chilean footballer
- Ramón Tapia Espinal, lawyer and political figure from the Dominican Republic
