= Derrick Etienne =

Derrick Etienne may refer to:

- Derrick Etienne (footballer, born 1974), a Haitian footballer
- Derrick Etienne Jr. (born 1996), a Haititan-American footballer and son of the above
