= Federico Molinari =

Federico Molinari may refer to:

- Federico Molinari (footballer) (born 1979), Argentine footballer
- Federico Molinari (gymnast) (born 1984), Argentine gymnast
