= Moussa Sy =

Guinean footballer (born 1979)

Moussa Sy (born 12 July 1979 in Conakry) is a Guinean football Striker who played for the Long Island Rough Riders of the United Soccer Leagues.
