= Hudson Catholic Regional High School =

Catholic high school in Hudson County, New Jersey, US

Location
- 790 Bergen Avenue; Jersey City, (Hudson County), New Jersey 07306; United States; 40°43′33″N 74°4′1″W

Information
- Type: Private, co-education
- Motto: Sign of Faith
- Religious affiliation: Roman Catholic
- Patron saint: Saint John de la Salle
- Established: 1964
- Oversight: Archdiocese of Newark
- NCES School ID: 00862314
- Principal: Terence Matthews
- Faculty: 30.1 FTEs
- Grades: 9–12
- Enrollment: 496 (as of 2023–24)
- Student to teacher ratio: 16.5:1
- Campus type: Urban
- Colors: Black and Gold
- Athletics: 13 varsity sports
- Athletics conference: Hudson County Interscholastic League (general); North Jersey Super Football Conference (football)
- Team name: Hawks
- Accreditation: Middle States Association of Colleges and Schools
- Newspaper: The Commentator
- Yearbook: The Hawk
- School fees: $750
- Tuition: $13,000 (for 2026–27)
- Website: www.hudsoncatholic.org

Hudson Catholic Regional High School is a regional four-year co-educational University-preparatory Catholic high school in Jersey City, Hudson County, New Jersey. The school was established in 1964 by the Roman Catholic Archdiocese of Newark, as a high school for grades 9–12.

The school was conducted by the De La Salle Christian Brothers of the Baltimore District, later changing to the District of Eastern North America in 2008. The remaining Brothers were withdrawn in the summer of 2012, leaving the school solely administered by the Archdiocesan of Newark education office. The school has been accredited by the Middle States Association of Colleges and Schools Commission on Elementary and Secondary Schools since 1972.

As of the 2023–24 school year, the school had an enrollment of 496 students and 30.1 classroom teachers (on an FTE basis), for a student–teacher ratio of 16.5:1. The school's student body was 30.6% (152) Black, 28.2% (140) White, 28.2% (140) Hispanic, 6.0% (30) two or more races, 5.0% (25) Asian, 1.2% (6) Native Hawaiian / Pacific Islander and 0.6% (3) American Indian / Alaska Native.

== History ==
In 1958, Archbishop Thomas Boland announced a campaign to build additional high schools throughout the four counties of the Archdiocese of Newark. To help achieve this goal, he requested the De La Salle Christian Brothers to administer Hudson Catholic Regional High School for boys, one of seven such high schools owned and operated by the Roman Catholic Archdiocese of Newark. Catholic teaching and values are integrated into each educational activity, program, curricular and extra-curricular program at Hudson Catholic.

The Bergen Avenue location of the school was formerly the site of the Fourth Regiment Armory. In the eighteenth century the site was the home of Jane Tuers, a member of the Van Rypen family and an American Revolutionary War heroine. Today the adjacent area is known as McGinley Square.

While the school was under construction in 1964, St. Patrick's Parish hosted Hudson Catholic's first class of 143 students. In the following year, students moved into the partially completed school building. On April 20, 1968, Bishop Martin Stanton officiated at the laying of the cornerstone and the blessing of the school facilities. In June of that year, Archbishop Boland presided at the school's first commencement ceremonies and presented diplomas to 109 graduates.

=== 2008 proposed closing ===
On April 11, 2008, Hudson Catholic announced that the school was to close on June 30, 2008, due to declining enrollment and a rising deficit. A campaign was started to save Hudson Catholic Regional High School led by current students, alumni, faculty, and the surrounding community. On May 7, 2008, it was announced at a meeting that $500,000 was raised and the school would stay open.

=== Post-2008 ===
There were about 320 students in the fall of 2008. The school became coeducational in 2009.

== The Brothers of the Christian Schools ==
From the time of its founding in 1964, Hudson Catholic was staffed by De La Salle Christian Brothers, a religious congregation of men in the Catholic Church who are devoted exclusively to the education of young people. The Brothers of the Christian Schools, as St. John Baptist de la Salle's followers came to be known, live in a prayerful community in a residence on campus. The "FSC" designation after the name of Brothers (as listed in the directory) is an abbreviation for the Latin phrase for Brothers of the Christian Schools. They take vows of poverty, chastity and obedience. They are not priests, since St. La Salle wanted them to consider teaching as their only vocation in life and as an indication of their commitment to young people. The Brothers ended their service to Hudson Catholic in July 2012.

== Academics ==
Students who attend Hudson Catholic are required to take four years of both Religion and English, in addition to three years of Science, History and Mathematics. Only two years are required for a Modern Language and Physical Education. However students do take more than the required years of the school's set academic requirements. The average class size is 26 students.

The school year is divided into two semesters, each having two quarterly marking periods. Mid-terms are administered at the conclusion of the first semester in late January and Finals are administered at the conclusion of the second semester in early June.

== Faculty ==
75% of the Hudson Catholic faculty have master's degrees, while one member possesses a Doctorate and two others a PhD. The 43 teaching faculty members share 49 Master's degrees and three members of the faculty are also adjunct professors at area colleges.

== De La Salle Scholars Program ==
The De La Salle Scholars Program is a comprehensive and integrated 4-year program intended to provide a scholarly, liberal education. The requirements are designed to meet the special needs of the academically gifted student. Accelerated content, in-depth study, small group discussion, interdisciplinary approaches and experimental learning opportunities are integral parts of the Scholars Program.

Student participants De La Salle Scholars are a select group of students who commit themselves to the pursuit of truth and knowledge. These scholars are expected to be active learners who take responsibility for their education.

Student selection Students are selected for the Scholars Program based on their overall intellectual ability as demonstrated by their grammar school grade point average, their high school entrance test scores, and recommendations provided by a teacher and/or counselor. Eighth grade students who select Hudson Catholic Regional High School as one of their choices for secondary education and who meet the criteria will be invited to join the Scholars Program. The invitation is accompanied by a scholarship offer of no less than $1000.00.

Program requirements

- One week pre-freshman summer program in communication, research and study skills.
- A full Honors course load, including Honors Latin, during the first year.
- An Integrative Seminar during the second year.
- A Service Project during the junior/senior year.
- A Scholars Qualifying Paper during the senior year.
- Three years of a Modern Foreign Language.
- A minimum of two subject area (one in humanities, one in science) at the Honors level throughout the four years, including at least one Advanced Placement course.

Program goals

- To ensure that each student has an opportunity to develop his intellectual gifts to the fullest.
- To enhance the opportunities for fellowship, service and leadership in a Christian community.
- To provide guidance and mentoring to students in the appreciation of their own talents and those of others.

== Extra-curricular activities ==
At Hudson Catholic, students are strongly encouraged to become involved in one or more of the extra-curricular activities and/or sports sponsored by the school, which include: Amnesty International, Biology Club, The Commentator, Drama Club (the Hawk Drama Society), Filipino-American Club, French Club, Hawk Yearbook, Lasallian Youth Group, Music Club (School Choir), National Honor Society, Peer Ministry, Spanish Club, Student Government, Technology Club, History Club, Anime/Manga Club, Madden Club, Ebony Club, Chemistry Club, Math Club, Model United Nations, Mock Trial, and just newly added a Forensics club.

== Athletics ==
The Hudson Catholic Regional High School Hawks compete in the Hudson County Interscholastic League, which is comprised of public and private high schools in Hudson County and operates under the supervision of the New Jersey State Interscholastic Athletic Association. With 364 students in grades 10-12, the school was classified by the NJSIAA for the 2019–20 school year as Non-Public B for most athletic competition purposes, which included schools with an enrollment of 37 to 366 students in that grade range (equivalent to Group I for public schools). The football team competes in the United Blue division of the North Jersey Super Football Conference, which includes 112 schools competing in 20 divisions, making it the nation's biggest football-only high school sports league. The school was classified by the NJSIAA as Non-Public Group B (equivalent to Group I/II for public schools) for football for 2024–2026, which included schools with 140 to 686 students.

In addition to intramural sports, interscholastic teams sponsored by Hudson Catholic include:

- Fall Sports: cross country, football, soccer (boys), soccer (girls), volleyball (girls)
- Winter Sports: basketball (boys), basketball (girls), swimming (boys), swimming (girls), bowling, indoor track and field
- Spring Sports: baseball, softball, rugby, tennis, volleyball (boys), outdoor track and field

The boys' basketball team won the Group A state championship in 1976, defeating Holy Spirit High School in the tournament final. The Hawks also won Hudson County Interscholastic Athletic Association League in 2011, 2012,

The Hudson Catholic hockey team won the parochial state hockey championship in 2000, defeating Seton Hall Preparatory School by a score of 2–1, and then defeated Bayonne High School by a 4–2 margin to win the Tournament of Champions. The team won the Handchen Cup in 1987, 1988, 1994.

The boys wrestling team won the North Jersey Non-Public Group B state title in 2008 and 2009.

In 2013, the baseball team won its first state title, finishing the season with a 19–10 record and defeating St. Joseph High School by a score of 7–0 in the Non-Public B tournament championship game.

The boys track team won the indoor relay championship in Non-Public Group B in 2015, 2016 and 2020.

The boys soccer team won the Non-Public B North state sectional final against Montclair Kimberley Academy in a 1-0 victory in 2016. The team is coached by Lou Ken-Kwofie.

The girls basketball team won the Hudson County Tournament in 2018 defeating Bayonne High School by a score of 55-42.

The girls volleyball team won the Hudson County Tournament in 2015 defeating Secaucus High School by a score of 2-1. The team won the Hudson County Tournament in 2016 defeating Secaucus High School by a score of 2-0. The team won the Hudson County Tournament in 2018 defeating Secaucus High School by a score of 2-0. The 2019 team repeated as Hudson County Tournament, again defeating Secaucus High School by a score of 2-0. The team won another Hudson County Tournament in 2021 defeating Union City High School by a score of 2-0.

The 2016 softball team won the Hudson County Tournament, the program's first, defeating Kearny High School in the championship gameby a score of 15-0. The Hawks won the Hudson County Tournament in 2020, defeating Bayonne High School by a score of 5-1.

== Technology ==
As of the 2006–07 school year, Hudson Catholic is the home to 200+ Pentium computers, three computer labs, High–speed wireless cable internet, Virtual Reality Unit, Mini-networks in labs, Video microscopy, Electronic balances, Digital microscopes, Level 3 SMART classroom (Biology Lab), and ten Smart Boards.

== Notable alumni ==
- Sean Connors (born 1969), politician who represented the 33rd Legislative District in the New Jersey General Assembly from 2012 to 2014
- Jack Curry (born 1964), analyst on the New York Yankees pre and postgame shows on the YES Network
- Jim DeRogatis (born 1964), music critic and co-host of Sound Opinions
- Grant Ellis (born 1993, class of 2012), television personality best known as a contestant on season 21 of The Bachelorette and as the star of season 29 of The Bachelor
- Louis Ken-Kwofie (born 1969, class of 1988), retired professional soccer player
- Louis King (born 1999, class of 2018), college basketball player for the Oregon Ducks
- Mike O'Koren (born 1958, class of 1976), basketball coach and former player and broadcaster
- Tahaad Pettiford (born 2005, class of 2024), college basketball player for the Auburn Tigers men's basketball team
- Jahvon Quinerly (born 1998, class of 2018), college basketball player for the Alabama Crimson Tide men's basketball team
- Dwayne Sabb (born 1969), former football linebacker and fullback in the National Football League, the XFL and the Arena Football League
- Jim Spanarkel (born 1957), former NBA player who has been a television analyst for the Brooklyn Nets on the YES Network and College Basketball on CBS

== Notable faculty ==
- Leonard Marshall (born 1961), defensive lineman for 12 seasons in the NFL who coached the school's football team to a 3–7 record in 2010
- Aileen Quinn (born 1971), actress, singer and dancer best known for having played the title role in the 1982 film Annie
