= Chris Fox =

American soccer player

Personal information
- Date of birth: July 30, 1974 (age 52)
- Place of birth: Marietta, Georgia, U.S.
- Height: 5 ft 10 in (1.78 m)
- Position: Defender

Youth career
- 1992–1995: Brown Bears

Senior career*
| Years | Team | Apps | (Gls) |
| 1996 | New York Fever | 12 | (0) |
| 1996 | Atlanta Ruckus | 5 | (0) |
| 1996–1998 | Buffalo Blizzard (indoor) | 43 | (4) |
| 1997–2005 | Richmond Kickers | 166 | (6) |
| Total | | 266 | (10) |
- * Club domestic league appearances and goals

Chris Fox (born July 30, 1974) is an American retired soccer defender who played professionally in the National Professional Soccer League and USL First Division.

Fox attended Brown University, where he was a 1995 First Team All Ivy soccer player. After graduating from Brown, Fox signed with the New York Fever of the A-League. The Fever waived Fox in August 1996 and the Atlanta Ruckus immediately signed him. In addition to his outdoor career, Fox also played indoor soccer. In January 1995, the Buffalo Blizzard selected Fox in the fourth round of the National Professional Soccer League amateur draft. He signed with the Blizzard in 1996. On February 6, 1998, the Blizzard released Fox to allow him to pursue a possible contract with the Dallas Burn. By then he was also playing for the Richmond Kickers of the USISL. He signed with the Kickers in April 1997 and played for them through the 2005 season. In 2001, he was First Team All League. On February 1, 1998, the Dallas Burn selected Fox in the first round (tenth overall) of the 1998 MLS Supplemental Draft, but was released during the pre-season.
