= Marcelo Fracchia =

Uruguayan footballer (born 1968)

Personal information
- Full name: Marcelo Wálter Fracchia Bilbao
- Date of birth: 4 January 1968 (age 58)
- Place of birth: Montevideo, Uruguay
- Height: 1.80 m (5 ft 11 in)
- Position: Midfielder

Senior career*
Years	Team	Apps	(Gls)
1987–1992	Central Español		
1992–1993	Deportes Temuco		
1994	Colo-Colo		
1995	Unión Española		
1996–1997	Deportes Concepción		
1998–2000	Everton		
2001–2004	New Jersey Stallions		

International career
1991	Uruguay	7	(0)
- * Club domestic league appearances and goals

Marcelo Wálter Fracchia Bilbao (born 4 January 1968, in Montevideo) is a former Uruguayan footballer.

== Club career ==
Fracchia spent most of his career in Chile, including playing for Deportes Temuco, Colo Colo, Unión Española and Everton de Viña del Mar. At the end of his career, he played for New Jersey Stallions in the United States, coinciding with his former teammate in Unión Española, Ramón Tapia.

== International career ==
Fracchia earned seven caps for the senior Uruguay national football team during 1991. He made his debut in a friendly match against Chile (2–1 win) on June 26, 1991, in the Estadio Centenario in Montevideo.

== Personal life ==
He is the father of the professional footballer Matías Fracchia, who was born in Chile, but has represented Uruguay as well as the United States at youth level.
