= Brad Wilson (soccer) =

American soccer player

Personal information
- Date of birth: November 19, 1972 (age 53)
- Place of birth: Long Beach, California, United States
- Height: 5 ft 10 in (1.78 m)
- Position: Midfielder

Youth career
- 1991: Irvine Valley College
- 1992–1993: St. Louis University
- 1994: Cal State Fullerton

Senior career*
| Years | Team | Apps | (Gls) |
| 1995 | Saarbrücken | | |
| 1996–1997 | Los Angeles Galaxy | 25 | (1) |
| 1997–1998 | Orange County Zodiac | 30 | (9) |
- * Club domestic league appearances and goals

Brad Wilson (born November 19, 1972) is a retired American soccer midfielder who played just over one season with the Los Angeles Galaxy in Major League Soccer.

Wilson graduated from El Toro High School in Lake Forest, California. In 1991, he attended Irvine Valley College. He transferred to St. Louis University where he played on the men's soccer team in 1992 and 1993. In 1994, he returned to California where he finished his collegiate career with Cal State Fullerton in 1994. In 1995, he played for FC Saarbrücken in the German Third Division.

In February 1996, the Los Angeles Galaxy selected Wilson in the 13th round (124th overall) of the 1996 MLS Inaugural Player Draft. He played twenty-two games with the Galaxy in 1996, then started the 1997 season before being waived July after three games. He moved to the Orange County Zodiac of the USISL. On February 1, 1998, the Tampa Bay Mutiny selected Wilson in the first round (7th overall) of the 1998 MLS Supplemental Draft. On March 2, 1998, the Mutiny waived Wilson. In the spring of 1998, he had a trial with the Chicago Fire, but was not signed. He then returned to the Zodiac for the 1998 season.

He currently coaches with the West Coast Futbol Club.
