= Rodney Rambo =

American soccer player

Personal information
- Date of birth: July 20, 1975 (age 51)
- Place of birth: Chicago, Illinois, U.S.
- Height: 5 ft 7 in (1.70 m)
- Position: Defender

Youth career
- 1993: La Jolla Nomads

College career
Years	Team	Apps	(Gls)
1993–1996	University of Portland Pilots Men's Soccer		

Senior career*
Years	Team	Apps	(Gls)
1999	New York Freedom	10	(1)
1999–2000	Long Island Rough Riders	9	(0)
- * Club domestic league appearances and goals

Rodney Rambo is an American retired soccer defender who played professionally in the MLS & USL A-League.

Rodney Rambo attended and graduated from the University of Portland, playing on the men's soccer team from 1993 to 1996. He graduated in 1997 with a B.B.A which included a double major of Marketing and Management. In 1997, the Seattle Sounders selected Rodney Rambo in the A-League draft. On February 1, 1998, the Kansas City Wizards selected Rodney Rambo in the second round (20th overall) of the 1998 MLS Supplemental Draft. Rodney Rambo played the 1999 & 2000 A-League season with the Long Island Rough Riders. He also spent part of the 1999 season with the New York Freedom.
