= Jack Curry =

American sports analyst (born 1964)

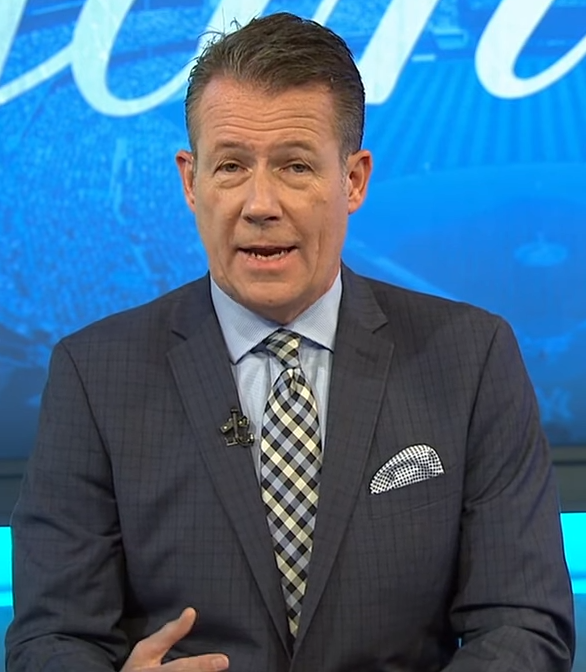
- Curry in 2021
- Born: November 25, 1964 (age 61); Jersey City, New Jersey, U.S.
- Education: B.A. in Communications; Fordham University; Hudson Catholic Regional High School
- Occupations: baseball pre-game and post-game analyst, website columnist
- Employer: New York Yankees

Jack F. Curry (born November 25, 1964) is an American sports journalist with more than 35 years of experience covering baseball in the New York market . He has worked as a studio analyst and a reporter for the YES Network since 2010, providing analysis and commentary on New York Yankees baseball games during pregame and postgame shows. He was won nine New York Emmy Awards at YES.

Until 2009, he was a national baseball correspondent for over a decade at The New York Times. Before taking over that position, he was the newspaper's Yankees' beat writer for seven seasons. His coverage of the Yankees overlapped with the team's dynastic run of four World Series titles in five seasons from 1996 to 2000. He worked at The New York Times for 22 years.

== Author ==
Curry has written or co-written four New York Times best-selling books. In 2000, Curry co-wrote a New York Times best-seller with Derek Jeter titled The Life You Imagine: Life Lessons for Achieving Your Dreams.

In 2019, Curry co-wrote another best-seller with David Cone titled “Full Count: The Education of a Pitcher”.

In 2022, Curry co-wrote another best-seller called Swing And A Hit: Nine Innings of What Baseball Taught Me with former Yankees outfielder and current YES Network broadcaster Paul O'Neill, followed in 2023 by The 1998 Yankees: The Inside Story of the Greatest Baseball Team Ever. It was also a best-seller.

== Television and radio ==
Before joining YES, Curry was guest on local New York sports programs such as WFAN's Mike and the Mad Dog radio program. He has been seen nationally on networks such as ESPN and MSNBC.

Curry currently works for the YES Network. He is seen on the network's pre-game and post-game coverage. He also hosts a podcast, Yankees News and Views for the YES Network.

== Personal ==
Curry graduated in 1982 from Hudson Catholic Regional High School in Jersey City, where he played varsity baseball and was the Sports Editor of the school newspaper. Curry was inducted into the school's Hall of Fame in 2016. In addition, Curry was indicted into the Irish Baseball Hall of Fame in 2024.

Curry earned a bachelor's degree in Communications from Fordham University in 1986.

As discussed on radio interviews and his news blog, he has competed in the New York City Marathon.
