= Cesar Alvarado =

Mexican footballer (born 1978)

Personal information
- Date of birth: December 18, 1978 (age 47)
- Place of birth: Mexico City, Mexico
- Height: 5 ft 9 in (1.75 m)
- Positions: Midfielder; forward

Youth career
- Citrus College

Senior career*
Years	Team	Apps	(Gls)
1997	Valley Golden Eagles		(1)
1998	MLS Pro 40	3	(0)
1999	Tampa Bay Mutiny	1	(0)
1999	→ MLS Pro 40 (loan)	1	(0)
- * Club domestic league appearances and goals

Cesar Alvarado (born 18 December 1978) is a Mexican former professional football midfielder who played for the Tampa Bay Mutiny in Major League Soccer.

Alvarado graduated from the American Global Soccer School. He attended the Cal Poly Pomona University and played for the Valley Golden Eagles of the USISL. On February 1, 1998, the Los Angeles Galaxy selected Alvarado in the second round (eighteenth overall) of the 1998 MLS Supplemental Draft. The Galaxy released him in the pre-season. That season, he played three games with MLS Pro 40. On February 25, 1998, the Tampa Bay Mutiny signed Alvarado.

Cesar, concluded his education in 2007 with a Major in Mechanical Engineering.
