= Matías Fracchia =

Chilean footballer (born 1995)

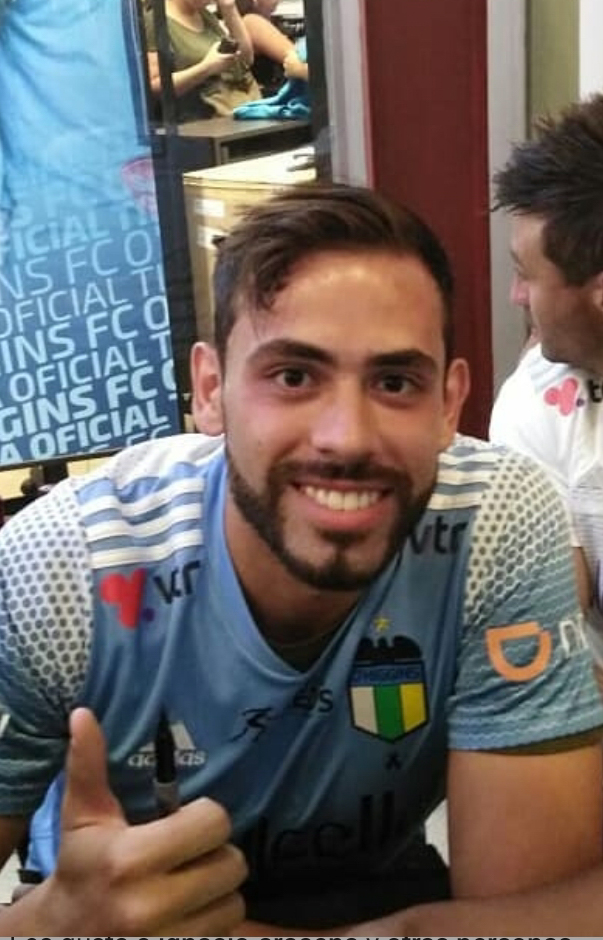
- Fracchia with O'Higgins in 2020

Personal information
- Full name: Matías Fracchia Moreira
- Date of birth: 21 September 1995 (age 31)
- Place of birth: Santiago, Chile
- Height: 1.88 m (6 ft 2 in)
- Position: Center-back

Team information
- Current team: SHB Da Nang
- Number: 3

Youth career
- NJSA 04

College career
Years	Team	Apps	(Gls)
2014–2015	NC State Wolfpack	18	(0)

Senior career*
Years	Team	Apps	(Gls)
2017	Deportes Temuco	0	(0)
2018	Barnechea	4	(0)
2019	Deportes Vallenar	21	(1)
2020–2022	O'Higgins	29	(0)
2022	Montevideo Wanderers	20	(1)
2023	Comunicaciones	39	(1)
2024	Danubio	32	(1)
2025	Coritiba	6	(0)
2026	Coquimbo Unido	0	(0)
2026	Cerro Largo	15	(0)
2026–	SHB Da Nang	0	(0)

International career^{‡}
2013	United States U20		
2014	Uruguay U20	1	(0)
- * Club domestic league appearances and goals as of 24 July 2026 ‡ National team caps and goals as of 4 August 2014

Matías Fracchia Moreira (born 21 September 1995) is a professional footballer who plays as a center-back for V.League 1 club SHB Da Nang. Born in Chile, he has represented both the United States and Uruguay at under-20 level.

== Early life ==
Fracchia played college soccer for North Carolina State University while he studied sports management.

== Club career ==
=== Deportes Temuco ===
In 2017, he moved to Chile and signed with Deportes Temuco.

=== Deportes Vallenar ===
For 2019, he signed for Chilean second division side Deportes Vallenar after failing to make an appearance for Deportes Temuco and Barnechea in the lower leagues.

=== O'Higgins ===
For 2020, he signed for O'Higgins in the Chilean top flight.

=== Comunicaciones ===
On 28 December 2022, Comunicaciones announced the official signing of Fracchia.

=== Danubio ===
In 2024, Fracchia signed with Uruguayan club Danubio.

=== Coritiba ===
In January 2025, Fracchia moved to Brazil and joined Coritiba in the Série B. They won the league title.

=== Coquimbo Unido ===
On 16 December 2025, Fracchia signed with then Chilean champions Coquimbo Unido. After making an appearance at the 2026 Supercopa de Chile against Deportes Limache, he ended his contract with them on 6 February 2026.

=== Cerro Largo ===
After leaving Coquimbo Unido, Fracchia returned to Uruguay and joined Cerro Largo in March 2026.

=== SHB Đà Nẵng ===
On 24 July 2026, Fracchia signed with Vietnamese club SHB Đà Nẵng.

== International career ==
Fracchia holds three different citizenships: Chilean by his birth, Uruguayan by his paternal line and American by residence. So, he has represented Uruguay as well as the United States at youth level.

== Honours ==
Comunicaciones

- Liga Nacional: 2023 Apertura

Coritiba

- Série B: 2025

Coquimbo Unido

- Supercopa de Chile: 2026

== Personal life ==
He is the son of the former Uruguayan international footballer Marcelo Fracchia.
