= Julio Cengarle =

Argentine-American soccer player

Personal information
- Date of birth: March 31, 1971 (age 55)
- Place of birth: Rosario, Argentina
- Height: 6 ft 3 in (1.91 m)
- Position: Defender

Youth career
- 1989–1991: Montclair State College

Senior career*
Years	Team	Apps	(Gls)
1995	Rosario Central		
1996	A.D. San Carlos		
1997	Maunabo Leones		
1998	Staten Island Vipers		
1998	Jacksonville Cyclones	22	(0)

Managerial career
- 2007: New Jersey City University (assistant)
- * Club domestic league appearances and goals

Julio Cengarle is a retired Argentine-American football (soccer) midfielder who played professionally in the United States, Costa Rica and Puerto Rico.

Cengarle moved to the United States as a boy. In 1989, he graduated from Don Bosco Preparatory High School in New Jersey. Cengarle attended Montclair State College where he played on the men's soccer team from 1989 to 1991. He graduated with a bachelor's degree in 1995.

On February 1, 1998, the Colorado Rapids selected Cengarle in the first round (eleventh overall) of the 1998 MLS Supplemental Draft. On March 4, 1998, the Rapids released Cengarle. He then signed with the Staten Island Vipers but left the team to join the Jacksonville Cyclones of the USISL A-League.

In 2007, he became an assistant with the New Jersey City University men's soccer team.
