= Mike Lima =

American soccer player

Personal information
- Full name: Mike Lima
- Date of birth: May 23, 1985 (age 41)
- Place of birth: Ludlow, Massachusetts, United States
- Height: 5 ft 11 in (1.80 m)
- Position: Midfielder

Team information
- Current team: Unity AC
- Number: 13

Youth career
- 2004–2007: Franklin Pierce Ravens

Senior career*
Years	Team	Apps	(Gls)
2008–	Western Mass Pioneers	26	(0)
- * Club domestic league appearances and goals as of August 8, 2010

Mike Lima (born May 23, 1985, in Ludlow, Massachusetts) is an American soccer player who currently plays for Western Mass Pioneers in the USL Premier Development League.

== Career ==
=== College and amateur ===
Lima attended Ludlow High School and played college soccer at Franklin Pierce University, winning an NCAA Division II national championship in 2007. A member of the Massachusetts Olympic Development team in 2002/2003. A member of the Under 16/17 boys Region One Olympic Development team in 2002/2003. United States Youth National Team Pool selection in 2002/2003. Nominated All-American/All New England honors. Awarded All-State honors in 2003. Played two seasons for Elms College in Chicopee, Massachusetts. Voted Northern Atlantic Conference Honorable Mention team in 2003/2004. Nominated Player of the Year in 2004/2005. Northern Atlantic Conference First team All-American 2004/2005. Northern Atlantic Conference point leader 2004/2005. Holds four all time records at Elms College; goals per season, goals per game, assist per game/season and career points. Holds three NCAA division three season records; goals per game, assists per game and overall points in 2004/2005. Played two seasons for the Franklin Pierce Ravens. Led Conference in assists in 2007. Received All-Conference award. Received NCAA All-Region first team selection in 2007.

=== Professional ===
Lima turned professional in 2008, signing with his hometown team Western Mass Pioneers, and made his pro debut on May 3, 2008, as a substitute in a 1–0 victory the Real Maryland Monarchs.
