= Gerry Lucey =

Irish footballer

Personal information
- Date of birth: May 26, 1966 (age 60)
- Place of birth: Dublin, Ireland
- Position: Midfielder

Youth career
- Home Farm

College career
Years	Team	Apps	(Gls)
1990	NYIT Bears		
1991–1993	C.W. Post		

Senior career*
Years	Team	Apps	(Gls)
1996–1997	North Jersey Imperials		
1998–2000	Long Island Rough Riders	78	(14)

Managerial career
- 1994–1999: C.W. Post (assistant, both men's and women's)
- 1999–2001: C.W. Post
- 2004–2006: Tampa Spartans (assistant)
- 2006–2007: West Chester Golden Rams
- 2007–2017: Tampa Spartans
- 2017: Hofstra Pride (volunteer assistant)
- 2018–2019: Dixie State Trailblazers
- 2019–2022: Hofstra Pride (associate head coach)
- 2023–: Florida Southern Moccasins
- * Club domestic league appearances and goals

Gerard "Gerry" Lucey is an Irish retired footballer and coach.

== Player ==
Lucey began his career with Home Farm in his native Ireland. He also played for Albertslund IF and Kobenhavns Boldklub. In 1990, Lucey moved to the United States where he attended New York Institute of Technology, playing one season on the school's soccer team. In 1991, he transferred to C.W. Post where he played three more seasons of collegiate soccer. After graduating from C.W. Post in 1994, Lucey played on local amateur teams. In 1996, he joined the North Jersey Imperials of the USISL Pro League. On July 30, 1997, the MetroStars of Major League Soccer called up Lucey for an exhibition game against the Long Island Rough Riders. In 1998, he moved to the Rough Riders where he played for three seasons.

== Coach ==
In addition to his career as a player, Lucey worked as an assistant coach with the C.W. Post men's and women's soccer teams from 1994 to 1999. In November 1999, Lucey became the head coach of the women's team after head coach Bob Blizt died of pancreatic cancer. Lucey continued as head coach for the 1999 season, compiling a two-season record of 15–5–1 He was the 2000 New York Collegiate Athletic Conference Women's Coach of the Year. In 2006, Lucey returned to collegiate coaching with a single season as West Chester University. He coached the team to a 23–1 record. In 2007, he moved to University of Tampa where he took the women's team to the NCAA Division II championship. He was inducted in 2018 into Tampa's "Hall of Fame" for being a noted contributor, and holds the record for their winningest coach. In the 2017–18 season, Lucey volunteered as an assistant coach to Hofstra University Pride women's soccer team, before accepting the head coaching position in the same for the Dixie State Trailblazers^{(Now known as the Utah Tech Trailblazers)}. After a single year at Dixie, Lucey returned to Hoftra as an assistant coach to their women's Soccer program, where he still coaches. Lucey and Hofstra was named as part of 2021's East Region Coaching staff of the year by The United Soccer Coaches.
