= Negoesco Stadium =

Soccer stadium located in San Francisco, United States

Coordinates: 37.776547°N 122.45386°W

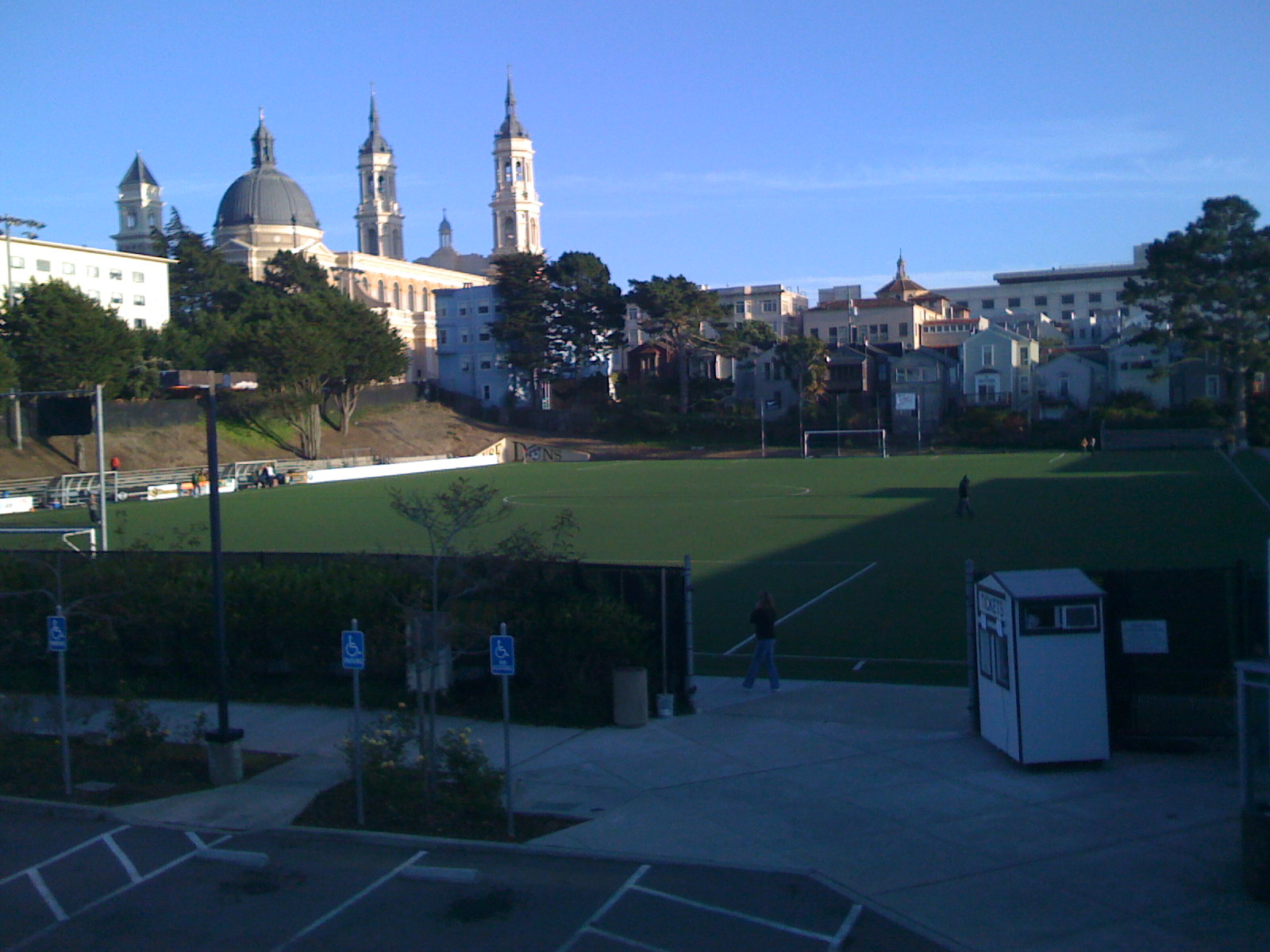
- View of the stadium in 2008
- Interactive map of Negoesco Stadium
- Full name: Stephen Negoesco Stadium
- Location: San Francisco, California, United States
- Owner: University of San Francisco
- Operator: Univ. SF Athletics
- Capacity: 3,000
- Type: Soccer-specific stadium
- Surface: Fieldturf

Construction
- Groundbreaking: 1982
- Opened: September 17, 1982; 44 years ago

Tenants
- USF men's soccer (NCAA) (1982-present); San Francisco Seals (USISL/PDL) (1992-1997, 2006-2008); San Francisco City (PDL) (2017)

Website
- usfdons.com/negoesco-stadium

Negoesco Stadium is a 3,000 seat soccer-specific stadium located in San Francisco, California, United States, on the campus of University of San Francisco. The facility was named in honour of USF soccer coach Stephen Negoesco. The stadium is also used by USF students and staff for recreational activities.

== History ==
The stadium was renovated in 2000 expanding it to its current capacity of 3,000 seats including theater style seats on the west side of the field and a full permanent grandstand on the east side. Additionally TV capable lights were added to the field that year. In 2003 the current fieldturf surface was added.

Negoesco Stadium from above

Negoesco has also hosted a US Open Cup game between the Los Angeles Galaxy and San Jose Earthquakes of Major League Soccer and an international friendly between the Earthquakes and Shanghai Shenhua of the Chinese Super League.

Some of the most notable improvements were made in September 2008, just before the Dons began their season, as banners celebrating the rich legacy and tradition of USF Soccer were hung along the stadiums west wall. Six national championship banners hang alongside 2 national runner-up banners and alongside banners celebrating the Dons glorious postseason past (30 NCAA appearances, 9 College Cup appearances). Additional banners also feature USF conference titles as members of the Northern California Intercollegiate Soccer Conference/West Coast Intercollegiate Soccer Conference, Pacific Soccer Conference, and the West Coast Conference. A final banner will feature the names of all 41 NSCAA All-Americans to proudly wear the Green and Gold.

Other changes include the installation of advertising panels acknowledging sponsors and supporters of USF Athletics and the Dons Soccer program alongside the east sideline of the field, and European-style protective team benches, were also added to the technical areas on the east sideline.
