= Sal Leanti =

American soccer player

Personal information
- Date of birth: June 16, 1976 (age 50)
- Place of birth: Staten Island, NY, U.S.
- Height: 6 ft 1 in (1.85 m)
- Positions: Defender; midfielder

Youth career
- 1994–1996: Fordham Rams

Senior career*
Years	Team	Apps	(Gls)
1997–1998	Long Island Rough Riders	47	(6)
1999	Staten Island Vipers	18	(2)
- * Club domestic league appearances and goals

Sal Leanti (born June 16, 1976) is an American retired soccer player who played three seasons in the USISL A-League.

Leanti attended the Fordham University, playing on the men's soccer team from 1994 to 1996.

On March 23, 1997, Leanti signed with the Long Island Rough Riders of the USISL A-League. He played the 1997 and 1998 seasons with Long Island. On February 1, 1998, the MetroStars selected Leanti in the third round (twenty-eight overall) of the 1998 MLS Supplemental Draft. The MetroStars released him during the pre-season. On April 1, 1999, Leanti moved to the Staten Island Vipers. After retiring from professional soccer, Leanti continued to play amateur, most notably for the Silver Lake Soccer Club of Staten Island, which competed in the Cosmopolitan Soccer League.
