= Anton Peterlin (soccer) =

American soccer player (born 1987)

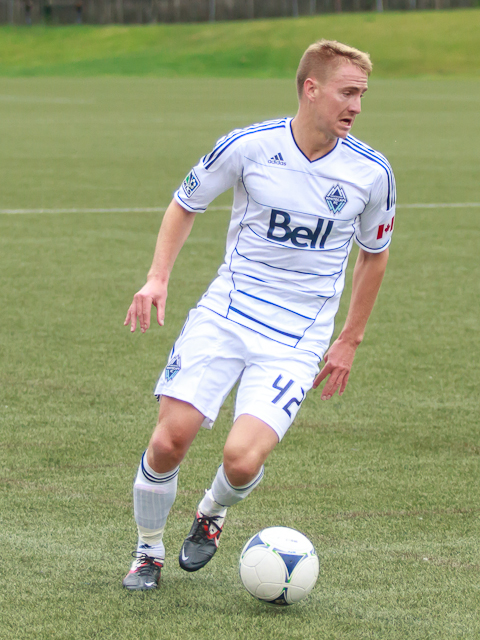
- Peterlin in 2012

Personal information
- Full name: Anton Alexander Peterlin
- Date of birth: April 4, 1987 (age 39)
- Height: 5 ft 11 in (1.80 m)
- Position: Midfielder

Youth career
- 2005: UCSC Banana Slugs
- 2006–2008: Cal Poly Mustangs

Senior career*
Years	Team	Apps	(Gls)
2007	San Francisco Seals	16	(3)
2008–2009	Ventura County Fusion	24	(2)
2009–2010	Everton	0	(0)
2010–2011	Plymouth Argyle	12	(0)
2011–2012	Walsall	31	(0)
2013–2015	HIK		
2015–2018	B.93		
- * Club domestic league appearances and goals as of February 20, 2013

Anton Alexander Peterlin (born April 4, 1987) is an American soccer player who plays as a midfielder, having previously played for San Francisco Seals, Ventura County Fusion, Everton, Plymouth Argyle and Walsall.

== Career ==
=== Amateur and college ===
Peterlin attended Lowell High School, where he was twice named the Most Valuable Player of San Francisco's public high school league. After graduating, he enrolled at the University of California, Santa Cruz, before transferring to California Polytechnic State University, where he majored in biology. At Cal Poly Peterlin was a Big West All-Conference First Team selection and an All-NSCAA Far West Region Third Team selection in his senior year.

During his collegiate off-seasons Peterlin played for the San Francisco Seals and Ventura County Fusion in the USL Premier Development League. Graham Smith, coach of the Fusion, recommended Peterlin to David Moyes, manager of Premier League club Everton. After impressing during a ten-day trial during the 2008–09 season, Everton announced on July 6, 2009, that they would sign him to a one-year contract. Peterlin rejected offers from Major League Soccer clubs Chicago Fire and San Jose Earthquakes to join Everton.

=== Professional ===
Peterlin made his Everton debut on July 10, 2009, in a pre-season friendly defeat to Bury. He played in eight reserve team games for the Toffees, but never made a first team appearance in any competition. He was released upon his contract expiry in June 2010 and he was offered a trial by Plymouth Argyle manager Peter Reid, a former Everton player.

Peterlin was successful with his trial and signed a one-year contract with Plymouth Argyle on July 27, 2010. He made his full professional debut on August 7, 2010, in Plymouth's 1–0 opening day victory over Southampton. Having made 14 appearances in all competitions during the 2010–11 season, Peterlin was one of nine first team players released by the club. He joined Walsall on trial in July 2011, and went on to sign a one-year contract after impressing their manager Dean Smith. He made his debut for Walsall on August 9, 2011, coming on as a substitute for Claude Gnakpa in a 3–0 League Cup defeat against Middlesbrough. Having left Walsall, Peterlin trialled with Hearts and Colorado Rapids.

== Personal life ==
Born in the United States to a Danish mother and Slovenian father, Peterlin holds dual citizenship in the U.S. and Denmark, which eliminated the need to secure a work permit. His mother Anne moved from Denmark to the United States to attend the University of San Francisco on a tennis scholarship. Peterlin's brother Sebastian is a rower at Stanford University.

== Career statistics ==
Club	Division	Season	League		Cup		League Cup		Continental		Total		Source
Club	Division	Season	Apps	Goals	Apps	Goals	Apps	Goals	Apps	Goals	Apps	Goals	Source
San Francisco Seals	USL PDL	2007	16	3	-	-	-	-	-	-	16	3	
Ventura County Fusion	USL PDL	2008	16	2	-	-	-	-	-	-	16	2	
Ventura County Fusion	USL PDL	2009	8	0	-	-	-	-	-	-	8	0	
Everton	Premier League	2009–10	-	-	-	-	-	-	-	-	-	-	
Plymouth Argyle	League One	2010–11	12	0	1	0	1	0	-	-	14	0	
Walsall	League One	2011–12	26	0	1	0	2	0	-	-	31	0	
