= Tim Weaver =

American soccer player

Personal information
- Date of birth: April 30, 1975 (age 51)
- Place of birth: Livermore, California, United States
- Height: 5 ft 11 in (1.80 m)
- Position: Defender

Youth career
- 1993–1996: San Francisco Dons

Senior career*
Years	Team	Apps	(Gls)
1997	San Francisco Bay Seals		
1998–1999	San Jose Clash	13	(0)
2000	Bay Area Seals	20	(0)
- * Club domestic league appearances and goals

Tim Weaver is a retired American soccer defender who played two seasons in Major League Soccer with the San Jose Clash.

== Soccer ==
Weaver attended the University of San Francisco where he played on the men's soccer team from 1993 to 1996. In 1997, he turned professional with the San Francisco Bay Seals of the USISL. In January 1998, the Richmond Kickers signed Weaver. On February 1, 1998, the San Jose Clash selected Weaver within the first round (third overall) of the 1998 MLS Supplemental Draft. In July 1998, Weaver had his right leg broken by a bad tackle in a friendly with Monarcas Morelia. He had played twelve games up to that time, but lost the rest of the season. He attempted to come back in 1999, but played only one game before being released. In 2000, he returned to the Seals, now playing in the USL A-League, for one last season. Weaver was recalled by the San Jose Earthquakes in 2002 for 3 games during the World Cup to replace Jeff Agoos. He didn't appear in any games.

== Medicine ==
After his retirement from soccer, Weaver pursued a career in medicine.
