= Mateus dos Anjos =

Brazilian footballer

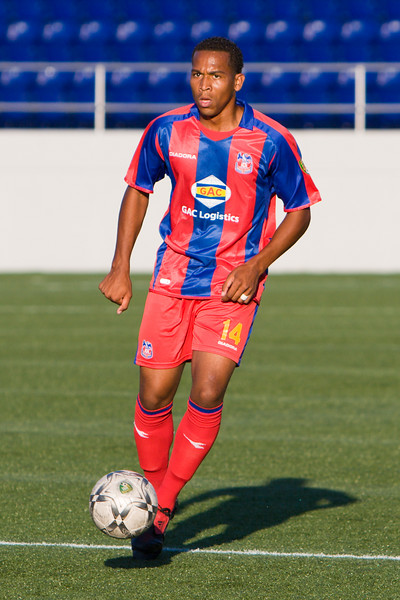

Personal information
- Date of birth: June 10, 1983 (age 43)
- Place of birth: Brasília, Brazil
- Height: 6 ft 0 in (1.83 m)
- Positions: Defender; midfielder

Youth career
- 2001–2002: Rockland Hawks
- 2003–2004: Southern Connecticut State Owls

Senior career*
Years	Team	Apps	(Gls)
2005	Atlanta Silverbacks		
2006	Western Mass Pioneers	6	(0)
2006	Guarani de Deivinopolis		
2006	Olimpia Bălţi		
2007	Crystal Palace Baltimore	18	(0)
2007	→ Miami FC (loan)	6	(0)
2007	New Jersey Ironmen (indoor)		
2008	Real Maryland Monarchs	5	(0)
2008–2009	Crystal Palace Baltimore	16	(0)
2009	Hispano		
- * Club domestic league appearances and goals

Mateus dos Anjos (born June 10, 1983) is a Brazilian former soccer player.

== Career ==
=== College ===
Dos Anjos grew up in Belo Horizonte, but moved from his native Brazil to the United States in 2001 to attend and play college soccer at Rockland Community College, and later Southern Connecticut State University. At Rockland he was named to his all-Conference teams in both his years there, while at Southern Connecticut State he was named to the All Conference second team in 2003 and the All Conference first team in 2004.

=== Professional ===
Dos Anjos trained with the MetroStars of Major League Soccer in 2004 before turning professional in 2005 with the Atlanta Silverbacks of the USL First Division Since then, Dos Anjos's career has taken him from the United States, to Brazil, and even Moldova, and has included stints with the Western Mass Pioneers, FC Olimpia Bălţi, Miami FC and twice with Crystal Palace Baltimore. After leaving CP Baltimore in July 2009, Dos Anjos travelled to Honduras and signed a contract with Hispano FC in the Honduran Premier League where he played for one season. At the end of the 2009 season, he was released from his contract for personal reasons.

Dos Anjos also has indoor soccer experience, having played with the New Jersey Ironmen of the Major Indoor Soccer League since September 2007.

== Career statistics ==
(correct as of 30 June 2009)

Club	Season	League			Cup			Play-Offs			Total		
Club	Season	Apps	Goals	Assists	Apps	Goals	Assists	Apps	Goals	Assists	Apps	Goals	Assists
Western Mass Pioneers	2005	6	0	0	?	?	?	-	-	-	6	0	?
Crystal Palace Baltimore	2007	18	0	0	1	0	0	-	-	-	19	0	0
Real Maryland Monarchs	2008	5	0	0	2	0	0	-	-	-	7	0	0
Crystal Palace Baltimore	2008	6	0	0	0	0	0	2	0	0	8	0	0
Crystal Palace Baltimore	2009	10	0	1	1	0	0	0	0	0	11	0	1
Career Total	2007–present	45	0	1	4	0	0	2	0	0	51	0	1
