= Louis Ken-Kwofie =

Ghanaian footballer (1969–2022)

Personal information
- Date of birth: 6 February 1969
- Place of birth: Ghana
- Date of death: 25 June 2022 (aged 53)
- Height: 5 ft 11 in (1.80 m)
- Position: Midfielder

College career
Years	Team	Apps	(Gls)
1988–1991	Montclair State	53	(10)

Senior career*
Years	Team	Apps	(Gls)
- New Jersey Stallions
1996	→ MetroStars (loan)	1	(0)
1996	→ Pennsylvania Natives (loan)	1	(0)
- Sparta Rotterdam

Managerial career
- Ramapo College
- * Club domestic league appearances and goals

Louis Ken-Kwofie (6 February 1969 – 25 June 2022) was a Ghanaian professional footballer who played as a midfielder.

== Early life ==
Ken-Kwofie attended Hudson Catholic High School.

== Career ==
=== College career ===
Ken-Kwofie played college soccer with Montclair State.

=== Professional career ===
Ken-Kwofie played one game for the MetroStars, on loan from the New Jersey Stallions, during the 1996 season of Major League Soccer. During that same season, Ken-Kwofie also played for the Pennsylvania Natives, ironically against the MetroStars. Ken-Kwofie was still playing for the Stallions during the 1999 season. Ken-Kwofie also played in the Netherlands with Sparta Rotterdam.

=== Coaching career ===
Ken-Kwofie coached Ramapo College. He also coached youth soccer in New Jersey, including the North Cadwell Soccer Club.

He later coached at Hudson Catholic Regional High School in Jersey City.

== Personal life and death ==
Ken-Kwofie died on 25 June 2022 following a battle with pancreatic cancer, aged 53.
