= Federico Molinari (footballer) =

Argentine footballer

Personal information
- Full name: Federico Molinari
- Date of birth: July 16, 1979 (age 47)
- Place of birth: La Plata, Argentina
- Height: 6 ft 0 in (1.83 m)
- Position: Defender

Senior career*
Years	Team	Apps	(Gls)
1999–2001	Gimnasia La Plata	6	(0)
2003	Western Mass Pioneers		
2004–2005	Cincinnati Kings		
2005	Deliese	5	(0)
2006–2011	Western Mass Pioneers	81	(13)

Managerial career
- 2011–2013: American International Yellow Jackets (assistant)
- 2012–: Western Mass Pioneers
- * Club domestic league appearances and goals as of May 15, 2011

Federico Molinari (born July 16, 1979) is an Argentine former footballer who is currently the head coach for Western Mass Pioneers in USL League Two.

== Career ==
=== Professional ===
Molinari started his playing career with Gimnasia y Esgrima de La Plata in his native Argentina 1999 before moving to the United States in 2003 to play for the Pioneers.

After brief stints playing for A.S. Deliese in Italy and for the Cincinnati Kings, Molinari moved back to the Pioneers in 2006.

Molinari took over as head coach of the Western Mass Pioneers in December 2011.
