= Travis Rinker =

American soccer player

Personal information
- Full name: Travis Rinker
- Date of birth: May 4, 1968 (age 58)
- Place of birth: Huntington, New York, United States
- Height: 6 ft 1 in (1.85 m)
- Position: Defender

College career
Years	Team	Apps	(Gls)
- Bridgeport Purple Knights

Senior career*
Years	Team	Apps	(Gls)
1994–	Long Island Rough Riders		
1996	→ NY/NJ MetroStars (loan)	3	(0)
- * Club domestic league appearances and goals

Travis Rinker (born May 4, 1968, in Huntington, New York) is an American former professional soccer player who played as a defender in Major League Soccer.

== Playing career ==
Rinker was named 1994 USISL Defender of the Year. In 1996, he was loaned to the NY/NJ MetroStars.

== Statistics ==
Club performance			League		Cup		League Cup		Continental		Total	
Season	Club	League	Apps	Goals	Apps	Goals	Apps	Goals	Apps	Goals	Apps	Goals
USA			League		Open Cup		League Cup		North America		Total	
1996	MetroStars (loan)	MLS	3	0	0	0	0	0	0	0	3	0
Career total			3	0	0	0	0	0	0	0	3	0
