= Barry Swift =

Trinidad and Tobago footballer

Personal information
- Date of birth: 11 November 1976 (age 49)
- Place of birth: Port of Spain, Trinidad & Tobago
- Height: 5 ft 9 in (1.75 m)
- Position: Forward

Senior career*
Years	Team	Apps	(Gls)
1998	MetroStars	2	(0)
1998	→ MLS Pro-40 (loan)	16	(1)
1999	Maryland Mania	6	(0)
2002	Brunei DPMM FC		
- * Club domestic league appearances and goals

Barry Swift (born 11 November 1976 in Port of Spain, Trinidad) is a former association football player who had a brief spell at the NY/NJ MetroStars during the 1998 season and played for Maryland Mania in the A-League in 1999.
