= Ramón Tapia (footballer) =

Chilean footballer

Personal information
- Full name: Ramón Antonio Tapia Allende
- Date of birth: 25 December 1972 (age 53)
- Place of birth: Linares, Chile
- Position: Forward

Youth career
- Universidad de Chile

Senior career*
Years	Team	Apps	(Gls)
1992	Universidad de Chile	0	(0)
1993–1994	Santiago Wanderers		(1)
1994	Deportes Ovalle		
1994	Audax Italiano	2	(0)
1995	Unión Santa Cruz	14	(1)
1995–1997	Unión Española	62	(13)
1998	Deportes Concepción	5	(4)
1998	Cruz Azul Hidalgo		
1999	Deportes Concepción	27	(2)
2000	Provincial Osorno	22	(1)
2001	Rangers	27	(7)
2002	Magallanes	25	(16)
2003–2004	New Jersey Stallions	22	(11)
- * Club domestic league appearances and goals

Ramón Antonio Tapia Allende (born 25 December 1972) is a Chilean former footballer who played as a forward for clubs in Chile, Mexico and the United States.

== Career ==
Born in Linares, Chile, Tapia is a product of the Universidad de Chile youth system. After having no chances to play for them at league level, he joined Santiago Wanderers in the Chilean Segunda División in 1993.

In the second level, he also played for Deportes Ovalle, Audax Italiano, Unión Santa Cruz and Magallanes.

In the Chilean Primera División, he played for Unión Española, Deportes Concepción, Provincial Osorno and Rangers de Talca. As a member of Deportes Concepción, he took part in the 1999 Copa CONMEBOL, the last edition.

Abroad, he had a stint with Mexican club Cruz Azul Hidalgo in 1998 alongside Cristián Montecinos, his teammate in Deportes Concepción. He ended his career playing for the American club New Jersey Stallions in the USL Pro Select League (2003) and the USL PDL (2004). In the club, he coincided with his former teammate in Unión Española, Marcelo Fracchia.

== Personal life ==
Tapia is nicknamed Colorado (Red-colored) due to his hair color.

He has worked as a public relations representative of pubs, being known by the nickname Zafrada, a distortion of "frazada" (blanket), like a well-known red-haired person in his homeland for surviving the 2010 Chile earthquake and tsunami.

Tapia made his home in the United States.
