= Fernando Fernandes (footballer) =

Angolan footballer

Personal information
- Date of birth: 25 November 1971 (age 54)
- Place of birth: Angola
- Height: 1.75 m (5 ft 9 in)
- Position: Midfielder

Youth career
- 1991–1997: Sacred Heart University

Senior career*
Years	Team	Apps	(Gls)
1998–1999	Long Island Rough Riders	32	(2)
1999	→ MetroStars (loan)	1	(0)
2000	Connecticut Wolves	15	(0)
2000–2001	Long Island Rough Riders	34	(6)
- * Club domestic league appearances and goals

Fernando Fernandes (born 25 November 1971) is an Angolan former footballer.

== Career ==
Fernandes attended Sacred Heart University, playing on the men's soccer team. In 1998, he signed with the Long Island Rough Riders. On 11 August 1999, he went on loan to the MetroStars of Major League Soccer for one game. He had played for the Rough Riders earlier in the day, giving him a game with two different teams in two different leagues in one day. In 2000, he began the season with the Connecticut Wolves, but returned to the Rough Riders at mid-season.
