= Carlos Ledesma =

Argentine footballer

Personal information
- Date of birth: 18 January 1964 (age 62)
- Place of birth: Argentina
- Height: 1.80 m (5 ft 11 in)
- Position: Midfielder

Senior career*
Years	Team	Apps	(Gls)
1996–1998	Long Island Rough Riders		
1998	→ MetroStars (loan)	1	(0)
2003–2004	Brooklyn Knights		

Managerial career
- Brooklyn Knights (assistant)
- * Club domestic league appearances and goals

Carlos Ledesma (born 18 January 1964) is a retired Argentina footballer spent part of the 1998 season with Major League Soccer club MetroStars, on loan from the Long Island Rough Riders.
