= Paul Grafer =

American soccer player (born 1974)

Personal information
- Date of birth: August 7, 1974 (age 52)
- Place of birth: Port Washington, New York, United States
- Height: 6 ft 3 in (1.91 m)
- Position: Goalkeeper

College career
Years	Team	Apps	(Gls)
1993–1995	William & Mary Tribe		

Senior career*
Years	Team	Apps	(Gls)
1996–1998	Colorado Rapids	13	(0)
1996	→ Long Island Rough Riders (loan)		
1999	Charleston Battery	0	(0)
2000	Long Island Rough Riders	28	(0)
2000	→ MetroStars (loan)	2	(0)
2001–2003	MetroStars	5	(0)
2001	→ Long Island Rough Riders (loan)	4	(0)
2005	Long Island Rough Riders	19	(0)

Managerial career
- 2007–2012: United States U17 (assistant)
- 2014: Chivas USA (assistant)
- * Club domestic league appearances and goals

Paul Grafer (born August 7, 1974) is an American retired soccer goalkeeper who spent six seasons in Major League Soccer with the Colorado Rapids and MetroStars. He was the goalkeeper coach for the United States U-17 men's national soccer team between 2007 and 2012. He has been a FIFA Instructor and assistant coach with Chivas USA of Major League Soccer. He has also been professionally affiliated with Athletes Helping Athletes and SAFE, organizations that provide lifeskills development and training to student athletes. Paul's current professional role is Technical Director for Major League Soccer.

== Youth ==
Grafer graduated from St. Mary's High School in 1992 where he was a Parade All-American. He then attended The College of William & Mary where he played soccer from 1993 to 1995. He was an All-American his senior year and gained his degree in kinesiology in 1997. In 2007, William and Mary inducted Grafer into the school's Athletic Hall of Fame.

== Professional ==
In February 1996, the Colorado Rapids selected Grafer in the 2nd round (19th overall) of the 1996 MLS College Draft. The Rapids sent him on loan to the Long Island Rough Riders of the USISL for the 1996 season. In 1997, made Rapids first team, playing thirteen games, gaining only one win, in 1997 and 1998. On September 30, 1998, he broke his left wrist in practice. The Rapids waived him on October 30, 1998. He signed with the Charleston Battery on January 28, 1999, but suffered a major neck injury during the pre-season and lost the entire year. Instead, he spent the entire year coaching with the Williamsburg Soccer Club. In 2000, he signed with the Long Island Rough Riders, having an excellent season. That resulted in him being called up to the MetroStars in 2000 after starter Mike Ammann was injured and backup Tim Howard was playing in the Olympics. In one of the odder moments in MLS history, the league held a draft consisting of only one player, Paul Grafer, after he signed late with the league. The San Jose Earthquakes selected Grafer, then traded him back to the MetroStars for Ramiro Corrales on February 23, 2001. He retired following the 2003 season. In 2005, he returned with the RoughRiders. He played nineteen games and was named second team All League.

== MetroStars folklore ==
Throughout his career with the MetroStars, he became known for his long, black pants, leading to the chant, "They’re long, they’re black, they’re halfway up his crack – they're Grafer's pants – they're Grafer's pants!"

== Post-playing career ==
He earned an MBA and taught at Adelphi University while working as a Program Coordinator for Athletes Helping Athletes, a New York-based non-profit that uses the power and appeal of sport to address social issues. In 2007, he became the goalkeeper coach for the U.S. U-17 national team. He left USSF in 2012 and became a FIFA Instructor for their Goalkeeping Programme, while helping develop SAFE LLC., a financial literacy and career development company for college student-athletes. In 2014, he joined Chivas USA of Major League Soccer as an assistant coach. In 2015, he joined MLS' League Office in the Competition Department.
