= San Francisco Seals (soccer) =

American soccer team

- Full name: San Francisco Seals
- Nickname: The Seals
- Founded: 1985
- Stadium: Negoesco Stadium; Kezar Stadium
- Capacity: 3,000; 10,000
- Chairman: (United States) Tom Simpson
Home colors	Away colors

The San Francisco Seals were a soccer team based in San Francisco, California. The team began as the senior team of the San Francisco United Soccer Club founded in 1985, a 501(c)(3) organization. The club is based in San Francisco. In 1992, the SFUSC youth team started playing as the "All Blacks" in the top tier of the USISL when Cal North Soccer, the governing body of youth soccer closed the youth program by blocking the movement of players across boundaries. The team played its home games at Negoesco Stadium on the campus of the University of San Francisco. The team's colors were black, red and white. After the first season and for five straight seasons the Seals dominated soccer on the West Coast winning 5 division titles, 3 regional titles and went to 3 national championship finals. In 1997 the Seals was called the "Team of the Year" by USA today after beating the Seattle Sounders, the Kansas City Wiz (now Sporting), and the San Jose Clash (now Earthquakes) in the Lamar Hunt U.S. Open Cup. The Seals continued in the A-League until 2000 when the franchise stopped professional soccer and returned to youth development. The Seals continued as members of the Y-League and expanded their youth development to include college level players in 2006 by entering the PDL. Since 2009 the Seals have concentrated on youth development from U6 to U23 soccer.

== History ==
=== Early years ===
The San Francisco United Soccer Club (SFUSC) was first organized as a youth soccer club in 1985 for Tom Simpson's two children. SFUSC was the first San Francisco club to ever travel to the prestigious Gothia Cup in 1987. Drawing on talented players from throughout the Bay Area, SFUSC soon became a "super club" and a dominant force in California state youth soccer. In 1991 the club created two teams, the Red Team and the Blue Team, who both advanced deep into the California Youth Soccer Association – North (Cal North Soccer) State Cup. The 1990 Red Team won SFUSC won the Cal North Soccer State Cup and continued on to take the Region IV title before advancing to the National "McGuire Cup" final losing to the Spartan Randolph Blackhawks of St. Paul, MN.

However, the rise of "super clubs" such as SFUSC sparked a counterreaction from smaller Northern California youth teams and in 1992 Cal North Soccer-North implemented rules to block SFUSC from competition. Faced with this opposition, the SFUSC decided to forsake the traditional path to amateur success, through the state competitions, and enter a team in the U.S. Interregional Soccer League, the forerunner of today's United Soccer Leagues.

Early San Francisco Bay Seals logo

In 1992 SFUSC formed a team known as the San Francisco All Blacks based on its all black uniform and entered it in the USISL. After an initial 7–7 season with U19 players, the team rapidly excelled in the face of stiff national-level competition. In 1993 the New Zealand All Blacks sent a cease and desist letter claiming copyright infringement forcing the team to change their name to the San Francisco Bay Seals.

In 1993, 1994 and 1995 the Seals took first place in the Pacific Conference, won the regionals in 1995, and went to the National Championship in Richmond. They won the Western Conference Division in 1996 and 1997, the Regional Title in 1996 and 1997, and went to the National Championships both years. In 1998, the Seals moved up to the A-League. In 2000, SFSCU sold the team to new ownership, which renamed the team the Bay Area Seals. However, the Seals lasted only to the end of the 2000 season before folding.

The Seals were division champions three times, in 1994, 1995 and 1997. In 1997, the Seals made an incredible and historic run to the semi-finals of the U.S. Open Cup. After winning the D3 U.S. Open Cup, the Seals knocked out the Seattle Sounders. They then took out two Major League Soccer clubs. First came the Kansas City Wiz in the round of 16, and then the San Jose Clash in the quarter-finals at the Clash's home field, Spartan Stadium. The Seals' Cinderella run through higher division clubs came to an end in the semi-finals when they lost 2–1 to D.C. United.

=== Resurrection in the PDL ===
Then, in 2006, after a six-year gap, the original club owners resurrected the senior team, this time as a franchise in the PDL as the San Francisco Seals. Their first year back in competition was fairly decent – four wins in their first six games, including a comprehensive 3–1 over California Gold – left the team well in contention for the playoffs as the second half of the campaign began. However, a disappointing run of results in the latter half of 2007, including a winless streak of 5 games from mid-June to early July saw the team slip down the table, eventually finishing 6th. The end of the season was enlivened by a staggering 8–1 victory over California Gold that featured a brace by Luke Sassano. Jose Diaz and Peruvian striker John Colan were the team's top scorers, notching 13 goals between them, while Shani Simpson contributed 4 assists.

2007 was a similar seesaw season of disappointing inconsistency for the Seals, when victory following defeat following victory following defeat all year long – this despite the presence of former Manchester City defender Danny Warrender marshalling the back line. The Seals did enjoy a comprehensive 3–1 victory over Orange County Blue Star in July, but failed to overcome their Bay Area rivals San Jose Frogs in their two-game series, losing 2–0 in San Jose in June, and losing 2–0 at home in their season finale. The Seals eventually finished a comfortable mid-table 6th; Anton Peterlin and Keith Ratzburg were joint top scorers with 3 goals each, while Richard Halvorsen registered 3 assists.

The Seals began 2008 in fine form, picking up four wins in their first six games, including 3–2 opening day victory over Fresno Fuego that featured a brace from Kellan Wilson, and a come-from-behind victory over Orange County Blue Star which again saw Wilson increase his goal tally by two. They only just missed out on qualifying for the U.S. Open Cup, beaten by a similarly fast-starting Los Angeles Legends, but suffered a down-turn in form in June, picking up just one win (2–0 away to Southern California Seahorses) and suffering a desperate last-minute loss away at Los Angeles Legends. It was this inconsistency which ultimately cost the Seals a place in the post-season; after three back to back wins in July, including a nailbiting 3–2 win over Lancaster Rattlers, nerves set in; a 3–0 final day loss to San Jose Frogs when a win was required proved to be the ultimate nail in the coffin. They eventually finished the season in 4th, just two points out of the playoffs. Kellan Wilson and Peter Lovell were joint top scorers with six goals each.

In December 2008 the Seals announced that, due to the folding of their local competition, the San Jose Frogs, and the state of the economy, they would not be fielding a PDL team in 2009.

== Players ==
=== Seals Hall of Fame Team ===
Note: Flags indicate national team as defined under FIFA eligibility rules; some limited exceptions apply. Players may hold more than one non-FIFA nationality.

No.	Pos.	Nation	Player
1	GK	USA	Eduardo Yoldi
19	DF	USA	C. J. Brown
3	DF	USA	Tim Weaver
14	DF	USA	Angelo Sablo

No.	Pos.	Nation	Player
9	DF	USA	Shani Simpson
10	MF	USA	Kenny Folan
6	MF	USA	Chris Davini
7	MF	USA	Rob Gallo
5	MF	USA	Joe Enochs
23	MF	USA	Kimtai Simpson
10	FW	USA	Shane Watkins
15	FW	USA	Marquis White
21	DF	USA	Keith Ratzburg

== Year-by-year ==
Year	Division	League	Regular season	Playoffs	Open Cup
San Francisco All Blacks
1992	N/A	USISL	3rd, Pacific	Did not qualify	Did not enter
1993	N/A	USISL	1st, Pacific	Divisional Finals	Did not enter
San Francisco United All Blacks
1994	3	USISL	1st, Pacific	Divisional Semifinals	Did not enter
1995	N/A	USISL Premier League	1st, Pacific, Western Regional Champions	3rd Place, National Championship	Did not qualify
San Francisco Bay Seals
1996	4	USISL Premier League	Pacific Division Champions	Western Regional Champions, National Championship Finalists	Did not qualify
1997	3	USISL D-3 Pro League	Pacific Division Champions	Western Regional Champions	Semifinal
1998	2	USISL A-League	6th, Pacific	Did not qualify	Did not qualify
1999	2	USL A-League	6th, Pacific	Did not qualify	Did not qualify
Bay Area Seals
2000	2	USL A-League	5th, Pacific	Conference Quarterfinals	Did not qualify
On Hiatus from 2001–2005
San Francisco Seals
2006	4	USL PDL	4th, Southwest	Did not qualify	Did not qualify
2007	4	USL PDL	6th, Southwest	Did not qualify	Did not qualify
2008	4	USL PDL	4th, Southwest	Did not qualify	Did not qualify

== Honors ==
- Tom Simpson, USISL Coach of the Year, 1997
- USISL D3 Pro League Western Conference Champions 1997
- US Open Cup Semi-Finalists 1997
- SCYS Premier League Regular Season Champions 2013
- SCYS Premier League Pacific Conference Champions 2013
- SCYS Premier League Regular Season Champions 2014
- SCYS Pacific Conference Champions 2014

== Head coaches ==
- (England) Tom Simpson (1992–1999, 2006, 2008)
- (England) Paul Aigbogun (2007)

== Stadiums ==
The Seals' last stadium, Negoesco Stadium

- Pioneer Stadium, Hayward, California (2000)
- Negoesco Stadium, San Francisco (2006–2008)
- Stadium at the College of Alameda, Alameda, California 1 game (2006)
- Stadium on Treasure Island, San Francisco 1 game (2006)
- Stadium at Livermore High School, Livermore, California 1 game (2006)
- Stadium at San Marin High School, Novato, California 1 game (2007)
- Stadium at Clayton Valley High School, Concord, California 1 game (2007)
- Stadium at Chabot College, Hayward, California 1 game (2008)

== Average attendances ==
- 2008: 157
- 2007: 180
- 2006: 172
