= Paul Kelly (soccer) =

American soccer player

Personal information
- Date of birth: May 1, 1974 (age 52)
- Place of birth: Springfield, Massachusetts, U.S.
- Height: 6 ft 1 in (1.85 m)
- Position: Defender

Youth career
- 1992–1995: Maine Black Bears

Senior career*
Years	Team	Apps	(Gls)
1996	Club Academica		
1997	New Hampshire Phantoms	27	(4)
1998	Worcester Wildfire	23	(5)
1999–2002	Western Mass Pioneers	42	(11)
2003	New Hampshire Phantoms	1	(0)
- * Club domestic league appearances and goals

Paul Kelly (born May 1, 1974) is an American former professional soccer defender.

== College ==
Kelly attended the University of Maine at Orono, playing on the men's soccer team from 1992 to 1995. He was a 1994 and 1995 Regional All American; 1992, 1994 and 1995 All North Atlantic Conference. In 1995, he played for the East team in the US Olympic Festival held in San Antonio, Texas.

In 2024, Kelly was elected to the UMaine Sports Hall of Fame

== Club ==
After college, Kelly played for the Luso American Soccer Association (LASA) team, Academica de Fall River. That summer, Academica won both the league and SuperCup titles. Kelly scored the game-winning goal in Academica's victory over the Dynamo Brava in the SuperCup final. In 1997, Paul then trained with the New England Revolution of Major League Soccer before moving to the USL to play for the New Hampshire Phantoms. The team advanced to the 1997 National Final Four in Albuquerque, New Mexico. The Phantoms fell in overtime to the Albuquerque Geckos in the semi-final. In 1998, Kelly moved to the A-League, playing for legendary player/coach John Kerr Jr. He started every game for the Worcester Wildfire. That year the Wildfire fell in penalty kicks to the Tampa Bay Mutiny in the US Open Cup. In 1999, Kelly signed with the newly formed Western Mass Pioneers of the USL. He served as team captain as the Pioneers captured the 1999 USISL D-3 Pro League title. Kelly was named to the D-3 Pro League First Team All Star team and was invited to the Major League Soccer combine in Fort Lauderdale, FL. Kelly returned to Western Mass for the 2002 season. This year the team lost in the Northeast Conference title game to the Connecticut Wolves despite winning the 2 match aggregate 4–3.

== Honors ==
2 time Regional All-American - '94 & '95
3 time All NAC Conference - '92, '94, '95
US Olympic Festival San Antonio, TX -1995
LASA All Star - 1996 Club Academica
USL All Star - 1999 Western Mass Pioneers
Captain USL National Champions - 1999
MLS Draft/Combine, Umbro Classic - 2000
