= Ben Hickey =

English footballer

Personal information
- Place of birth: Birmingham, England
- Position: Midfielder

Youth career
- 1993–1996: St. John's Red Storm

Senior career*
Years	Team	Apps	(Gls)
1997	Connecticut Wolves	25	(9)
1998	Long Island Rough Riders	16	(4)
1999	North Jersey Imperials	5	(7)
2002–2003	New York Freedom	20	(6)
- * Club domestic league appearances and goals

Ben Hickey is an English retired football midfielder who played professionally in the USL A-League.

Hickey attended St. John's University where he was a 1995 First Team All American and 1996 Second Team soccer player. His senior season, the Red Storm won the NCAA Men's Division I Soccer Championship.

In February 1997, the Connecticut Wolves selected Hickey in the first round (twenty-third overall) of the USISL draft. He played the 1997 season with the Wolves, then moved to the Long Island Rough Riders for the 1998 season. In 1999, he played for the North Jersey Imperials. In 2002 and 2003, he played for the New York Freedom. He has now settled in California with his beautiful wife, Latika Hickey and three loving daughters, Ayanna, Shaelyn, and Grace.
