= Martin Munnelly =

American soccer player

Personal information
- Date of birth: November 11, 1969 (age 56)
- Place of birth: New York, New York, U.S.
- Height: 5 ft 11 in (1.80 m)
- Position: Midfielder

Youth career
- 1988–1991: Columbia Lions

Senior career*
Years	Team	Apps	(Gls)
1994–1997	Long Island Rough Riders		
1996	→ MetroStars (loan)	1	(0)

International career
1989	US U-20		
- * Club domestic league appearances and goals

Martin Munnelly (born November 11, 1969) is an American retired soccer midfielder who played professionally in Major League Soccer and the USISL.

== Youth ==
Munnelly graduated from Chaminade High School. He then attended the Columbia University, playing on the men's soccer team from 1988 to 1991

== Professional ==
In 1994, Munnelly signed with the Long Island Rough Riders of the USISL. In 1995, Munnelly and his teammates won the USISL championship. On June 26, 1996, he went on loan to the MetroStars of Major League Soccer for one game. The Rough Riders released Munnelly on July 10, 1997.

Now he works as a Sophomore World History Teacher and Junior American History Teacher at his old High School, Chaminade.

== International ==
In 1989, Munnelly was a member of the United States men's national under-20 soccer team which placed fourth at the 1989 FIFA World Youth Championship.
