= Jim Rooney (soccer) =

American soccer player and coach

Personal information
- Date of birth: September 9, 1968 (age 58)
- Place of birth: The Bronx, New York, United States
- Height: 5 ft 11 in (1.80 m)
- Positions: Midfielder; striker

Team information
- Current team: Boca Raton FC (Head Coach)

Youth career
- 1987–1988: Fordham University
- 1993: C.W. Post

Senior career*
Years	Team	Apps	(Gls)
1994–1997	Long Island Rough Riders	44	(11)
1998–1999	MetroStars	29	(8)
1998	→ Staten Island Vipers (loan)	2	(1)
1999–2001	Miami Fusion	67	(12)
2002	New England Revolution	20	(1)
2004	Long Island Rough Riders	9	(1)
Total		169	(33)

Managerial career
- 2011: Fort Lauderdale Strikers (assistant)
- 2012: United States U-17 (assistant)
- 2017–: Boca Raton FC
- * Club domestic league appearances and goals

Jim Rooney (born September 9, 1968) is an American former professional soccer player who played as both a midfielder and a striker. He is currently the head coach of National Premier Soccer League team Boca Raton FC.

== Early life ==
Jim Rooney was born in The Bronx, New York City.

== Playing career ==
=== College ===
Rooney played college soccer at Fordham University and C.W. Post. At C.W. Post, he played with the Pioneers. He currently holds the school's record for most goals in a single season: 21.

=== Professional ===
Rooney began his professional career in 1994 with the Long Island Rough Riders. he later played in Major League Soccer for the MetroStars, the Miami Fusion and the New England Revolution, making a total of 116 appearances. Rooney then returned to the Long Island Rough Riders in June 2004. In 1998, he scored a goal on loan from the MetroStars to the Staten Island Vipers.

== Coaching career ==
Rooney was hired as assistant coach for Fort Lauderdale Strikers of the North American Soccer League on February 4, 2011. In February 2012, it was announced that Rooney would be joining the staff of Richie Williams and the United States men's national under-17 soccer team.

In January, 2016, Rooney was hired as Assistant Coach for the Jacksonville Armada FC of the North American Soccer League under Head Coach Tony Meola.

In January 2017, Boca Raton FC announced the hiring of Jim Rooney. Rooney will lead Boca Raton FC during the 2018 season.
