= Julian Gómez =

Colombian-born American soccer player

Personal information
- Full name: Julian Gómez
- Date of birth: September 19, 1978 (age 48)
- Place of birth: Cali, Colombia
- Height: 6 ft 2 in (1.88 m)
- Positions: Striker; midfielder

Youth career
- NCC Lions

Senior career*
Years	Team	Apps	(Gls)
- Brooklyn Knights
2000	MetroStars	3	(0)
- * Club domestic league appearances and goals

Julián Gómez (born September 19, 1978, in Cali) is a Colombian-born American retired professional soccer player.

== Early life ==
Gómez grew up playing soccer in the Long Island Junior Soccer League.

== Playing career ==
Gómez was waived by MetroStars on January 22, 2001.

== Statistics ==
Club performance			League		Cup		League Cup		Continental		Total	
Season	Club	League	Apps	Goals	Apps	Goals	Apps	Goals	Apps	Goals	Apps	Goals
USA			League		Open Cup		League Cup		North America		Total	
2000	MetroStars (loan)	MLS	3	0	2	0	0	0	0	0	5	0
Career total			3	0	0	0	0	0	0	0	3	0
