= Long Island Rough Riders =

- Full name: Long Island Rough Riders
- Nickname: Rough Riders
- Founded: 1994; 32 years ago
- Stadium: Hofstra University Soccer Stadium
- Capacity: 1,600
- Owner: Peter Zaratin
- Head Coach: Tom Bowen
- League: USL League Two
- 2024: 1st, Metropolitan Division; Playoffs: Conference Quarterfinals
- Website: liroughriders.com
Home colors	Away colors

The Long Island Rough Riders are an American soccer club based in South Huntington, New York, United States. Founded in 1994, the team plays in USL League Two, the fourth tier of the American Soccer Pyramid.

The team plays its home games at Mitchel Athletic Complex. The team's colors are white and blue.

The club also has a women's team, also called the Long Island Rough Riders, who play in USL W League.

== History ==
=== Early years in the USISL ===
The Rough Riders played their first season in 1994, led by local legend Alfonso Mondelo, fielding a team in the USISL that featured future US national team player Chris Armas, who would lead the team in scoring with eight goals and four assists. Long Island (13–5) won the Northeast Division, finishing seven points ahead of North Jersey Dragons. The Rough Riders were placed in the "Raleigh Group" of the USISL 'Sizzling Nine' Championships, and qualified along with the Minnesota Thunder to face Greensboro Dynamo in the national semifinal; they lost the game 2–1 in overtime as Greensboro went on to take the title.

For their second season in 1995, the Rough Riders added several more players who would go on to excel in Major League Soccer, including US national team members Tony Meola and John Difley, Jim Rooney, and Giovanni Savarese, who would be named the USISL regular season and playoff MVP, and who scored 23 goals during the campaign. The Rough Riders finished the season with a 19–1 record, top of the Coastal Conference for a second year running, and received a bye to the 'Sizzling Nine' Championship tournament. Wins over the Monterey Bay Jaguars and the New Mexico Chiles in group play took them to the national semifinal for a second time. Unlike the year prior, the Rough Riders won their semi 5–2 against the Tampa Bay Cyclones, and then beat Minnesota Thunder 2–1 to win the USISL Championship.

The Rough Riders lost several players to the nascent MLS in 1996, including Meola, Savarese and Difley, but went on to have a successful season nevertheless, finishing with an 11–7 record and winning the North Atlantic Division. They beat Delaware Wizards 2–0 in the second round of the playoffs, and qualified from a 'Select Six' tournament group, but lost 1–0 to the Richmond Kickers in the playoff semifinals.

=== Promotion to the A-League ===
With the merger of the USISL and the American Professional Soccer League in 1997, the Rough Riders decided to move up, and began their first season in the A-League in that year. They finished the regular season third in the Northeast Division behind Montreal Impact with a 13–10–5 record. Long Island beat Rochester Raging Rhinos and the Impact in the playoffs, before losing the Carolina Dynamo in the semifinals. The Rough Riders also enjoyed a run to the quarterfinals of the US Open Cup, beating USASA amateur team Bridgeport Italians in the second round, then upsetting Major League Soccer side New England Revolution 4–3 before eventually falling to the New York/New Jersey MetroStars 1–0 on a golden goal. Defender Travis Rinker made the All A-League Team that year.

The Rough Riders finished fourth in the Northeast Division in 1998, and lost in the first round of the playoffs to the Kickers. The following season was a similar story as the team finished third in the regular season, and were defeated in the first round of the playoffs by the Pittsburgh Riverdogs. Strikers John Wolyniec and Darko Kolic were much more prolific, scoring 15 and seven goals, respectively.

Fortunes improved significantly in 2000, as the Rough Riders claimed their first regular-season title at this level, winning the Northeast Division by one point over the Rochester Raging Rhinos with a 16–9–4 record. Striker Edson Buddle scored 11 of the team's 54 goals, and goalkeeper Paul Grafer posting a 1.29 goals against average. Their title came thanks to nine bonus points earned for scoring three or more goals in a game. However, for a third straight season, playoff success eluded the Rough Riders, who lost 2–1 to the Toronto Lynx in the conference quarterfinals.

The high of the first year of the new millennium was followed by a disappointing low in 2001 as the Rough Riders slumped to their first losing record in years (8–16–4), finishing sixth in the Northern Conference – 42 points behind divisional champions Hershey Wildcats. Following the campaign, team ownership decided to voluntarily relegate the team to the D3 Pro League for 2002.

=== Back to the Third Tier – USL Second Division ===
The Rough Riders bounced back magnificently in 2002, winning the D3-Pro League Atlantic Conference with a 13–6–1 record, six points clear of New York Freedom in second place. Derrick Etienne and Cordt Weinstein combined for 27 goals, while goalkeeper Billy Gatti maintained an imposing presence in net. Long Island squeaked past New York on penalty kicks after a 2–2 tie in the playoff quarterfinals, and enjoyed a dominant 3–0 win over the Connecticut Wolves in the semifinal to reach the championship game. The final against Southern Conference champions Wilmington Hammerheads was a tight game, but the Rough Riders emerged as 2–1 victors to take their second championship in franchise history.

The Rough Riders retained their divisional title in 2003, despite the league being re-aligned and renamed the Pro Select League. Long Island went 13–4–3, 13 points clear of the New Jersey Stallions, their closest rival, and with Etienne again scoring 10 goals. The Rough Riders enjoyed some impressive victories in the regular season campaign, including a 3–0 victory on the road in May over Westchester Flames, a 4–1 road win over Jersey Falcons in early July, and a pair of comprehensive wins over Reading Rage, 5–1 and 4–1. The Rough Riders also made their second trip to the US Open Cup, but lost 2–1 in the second round to USL-PDL team Mid Michigan Bucks. Despite being favorites to progress through the playoffs, they were upset by the Stallions 5–4 on penalty kicks after a scoreless tie in the playoff regional final.

Long Island struggled in 2004, finishing last in the Atlantic Division with an 8–11–1 record. The season was, however, significant because it marked the return of two former Rough Riders – Jim Rooney from the New England Revolution and Giovanni Savarese from overseas. Etienne was again Long Island's top scorer with 11 goals.

The USL Pro Soccer League became the USL Second Division in 2005, and reverted to a single-table format, consisting of nine teams all based on the East Coast. The season started in up-and-down fashion. An opening day 4–1 win over the Northern Virginia Royals was followed by a win over New Hampshire Phantoms, then two losses, two wins and then three losses. The team enjoyed a couple of comprehensive victories, notably a second 4–1 win over Northern Virginia Royals in which Moussa Sy scored all four goals, and a 5–2 hammering of New Hampshire Phantoms in early July. Their US Open Cup campaign ended early with a shocking 4–0 defeat to PDL side Ocean City Barons in the second round. The Rough Riders lost their final five games of the regular season, including a demoralizing 4–1 thrashing at home to Western Mass Pioneers, and finished the season in sixth place with a 7–13–0 record, missing the playoffs for a second straight year. Etienne was Long Island's top scorer again (nine goals), while Wilmer Cabrera contributed five assists.

The next season was arguably the worst in team history, with the Rough Riders finishing at the bottom of the table with three wins and fifteen goals scored. The 2006 season was marred by a 13-game winless streak stretching from opening day through mid-July. Losses included: 5–0 to Richmond Kickers, 3–0 to Harrisburg City Islanders, and 3–0 to Wilmington Hammerheads. Long Island's first victory was a scrappy 1–0 home win against New Hampshire Phantoms at home, on an 84th-minute strike from Moussa Sy. The high point was a 3–2 seesaw win over Wilmington in the season finale. Following the campaign, the team chose to voluntarily relegate themselves to the USL-PDL for the 2007 season.

=== USL-PDL ===
The Rough Riders' first season in PDL began with four straight wins, including a 3–1 road win against the Brooklyn Knights. Their early season form took them to the US Open Cup for the fourth time, but they exited the competition at the hands of USL First Division stalwarts Rochester Raging Rhinos. Long Island's home form was their strong point, with five wins and a tie in front of their fans at Michael Tully Field. The Rough Riders' first season at this level ended with them fourth in the Northeast Division, nine points behind divisional champs Cape Cod Crusaders, and just out of the playoffs. Mike Grella was top scorer with five goals, while Jose Batista contributed five assists.

Long Island was again a playoff contender in 2008. The Rough Riders tied their first game of the season 1–1 before demolishing Virginia Legacy 5–1, with Mike Grella scoring a hat trick. The team was again successful at home, registering five wins and three ties at Michael Tully Field. They won an exciting 4–3 encounter with the Westchester Flames in early June, scored a 90th-minute equalizer through goalkeeper Hasely Holder to tie 3–3 with Newark Ironbound Express, and flattened New Jersey Rangers 6–0, with Grella and Anthony Barberio scoring two goals each. The Rough Riders finished the season third in the Northeast Division, two points behind Newark Ironbound Express, and agonizingly out of the playoffs for the second consecutive year. Mike Grella and Michael Todd were the team's leading scorers, each scoring five goals. Todd and Tadeu Terra tallied four assists apiece.

In 2009, the Rough Riders (12–2–2) finished in second place in the Northeast Division. Despite failing to qualify for the U.S. Open Cup, they clinched a spot in the divisional playoffs. The Rough Riders lost 2–0 to the Ocean City Barons.

The Rough Riders ended the 2010 season in fourth place in the Mid Atlantic Division with an 8–4–3 record. They made their fifth U.S. Open Cup appearance and advanced to the second round for the first time since 1997 when they defeated the New England Revolution of Major League Soccer. They opened up the first round against the New York Pancyprian-Freedoms. Long Island took the lead in the first half as Danny Kramer scored off a cross from Ben Arikian. In the second half, the Rough Riders added another goal as Alex Grendi took a shot off a cross from Kramer and it found the back of the net. The Rough Riders were defeated by the Harrisburg City Islanders in the second round. In December, the team was invited by the Bermuda Football Association to participate in its BFA Christmas 2010 tour, a holiday tournament for local and international clubs. The Rough Riders played against Bermuda's Under-20 World Cup National Team, The Dandy Town Hornets, and Bermuda's Premier Division League Champions.

Long Island (12–1–3) finished atop of the Eastern Conference Mid Atlantic Division in 2011 which solidified a spot in the postseason. In their first playoff appearance in two years, the Rough Riders defeated the New Hampshire Phantoms 3–2 as Dominick Sarlee netted a hat trick in the USL Premier Developmental League's Eastern Conference Championships. The Rough Riders' postseason continued as they advanced to the PDL Eastern Conference Championship against Mid Atlantic Division rivals Jersey Express. Midfielder Stephan Barea's winner in the 84th minute propelled the Rough Riders to the PDL Championship semifinal against the Laredo Heat, where they'd lose 4–1.

In 2012, the Rough Riders welcomed back captain Danny Kramer and former MLS player, Gary Flood. The team finished in fifth place with a record of 6–7–3. The Rough Riders lost 2–0 to second round to Harrisburg City Islanders in the second round of the U.S. Open Cup.

Long Island went 7–5–2 in 2013, finishing in third place in the division, failing to qualify for the postseason and U.S. Open Cup. Former Rough Riders player James Nealis was chosen in the 37th round in the MLS Draft by the Houston Dynamo.

The Rough Riders concluded the 2014 season with an 8–4–2 record. They finished in third place of the Mid Atlantic Division and were four points shy from solidifying a spot in the playoffs.

In 2015, the Rough Riders finished in second place in the Mid Atlantic Division at 9–4–1, advancing to the PDL playoffs for the first time since 2011. The semifinal match against the Jersey Express remained scoreless until the 48th minute when Kramer's shot from inside the penalty box put the Rough Riders ahead. A minute later, the Express got on the scoreboard with the equalizer. The Express took the lead in the 52nd minute and provided another goal in the 76th minute en route to a 3–1 comeback win. Former Rough Riders player Tim Parker made his Major League Soccer playoff debut for the Vancouver Whitecaps against the Portland Timbers in early November. Parker also earned his first call-up to the United States National Team training camp in January that included international friendlies versus Canada and Iceland.

The Rough Riders finish third in the Northeast Division with a record of 6–5–3 the next season.

In 2017, the Rough Riders went 10–2–5 en route to the PDL Eastern Conference Final. Long Island, which finished runner-up in the Northeast Division, defeated Mid-Atlantic winners New York Red Bulls U-23 in an Eastern Conference play-in game. The Rough Riders beat the Myrtle Beach Mutiny, winners of the South Division, in the conference semifinals, before losing to eventual PDL champion Charlotte on penalty kicks in the Eastern Conference Final.

Former Rough Riders midfielder Stephen Roche was named head coach on February 13, 2018. He guided Long Island to a 10–5–1 overall record and 9–4–1 record in the PDL, finishing in third place. The offseason was highlighted by midfielder Danny Bedoya signing with New York City FC, Rough Riders' parent club, on August 9.

== MLS Affiliation ==
On April 21, 2016, New York City FC announced the Long Island Rough Riders would be their official Premier Development League affiliate beginning with the 2016 season.

== Proposed USLD3 Expansion ==
The Long Island Rough Riders proposed an artificial turf soccer stadium on the campus of Suffolk County Community College Grant Campus in Brentwood. In an attempt to bring in a professional soccer team that would compete in the USL League One.

== Players ==
=== Notable former players ===
This list comprises notable former players of the men's Long Island Rough Riders

- (England) Gary Ablett
- (United States) Chris Aloisi
- (United States) Chris Armas
- (United States) Stephan Barea
- (Angola) Edgar Bartolomeu
- (Peru) Nelson Becerra
- (United States) Michael Behonick
- (United States) Rhett Bernstein
- (United States) Bobby Brennan †
- (United States) Mark Briggs
- (United States) Edson Buddle
- (Colombia) Wilmer Cabrera
- (United States) Matt Chulis
- (United States) Jordan Cila
- (England) Sam Craven
- (United States) Stephen Danbusky
- (Colombia) Óscar Díaz *
- (United States) John Diffley *
- (Haiti) Darrell Etienne
- (Angola) Fernando Fernandes
- (Brazil) Flavio Ferri *
- (United States) Gary Flood
- (United States) Kevin Garcia
- (United States) Paul Grafer
- (United States) Mike Grella
- (United States) Alex Grendi
- (United States) Andrew Herman
- (England) Ben Hickey
- (United States) Shaun Higgins
- (Trinidad and Tobago) Thorne Holder
- (United States) Ernest Inneh *
- (United States) Steve Jolley
- (Trinidad and Tobago) Irasto Knights
- (Serbia) Darko Kolić*
- (United States) Mickey Kydes*
- (Argentina) Carlos Ledesma *
- (United States) Sal Leanti*
- (United States) Daniel Leon
- (United States) Tom Lips
- (Republic of Ireland) Gerry Lucey
- (England) Luke Magill
- (United States) Laurent Manuel
- (Puerto Rico) Richard Martinez
- (Honduras) Saúl Martínez*
- (United States) Mike Masters
- (Jamaica) Anthony McCreath
- (Northern Ireland) Mick McDermott
- (United States) Ryan Meara
- (Puerto Rico) Chris Megaloudis
- (Dominican Republic) Óscar Mejía*
- (United States) Tim Melia
- (United States) Tony Meola*
- (United States) Carlos Mendes*
- (United States) Andrew Mittendorf
- (United States) Dahir Mohammed
- (Puerto Rico) Danny Mueller
- (United States) Martin Munnelly*
- (United States) Jimmy Nealis
- (United States) Conor O'Brien
- (Kenya) Mo Oduor*
- (United States) Mike Palacio
- (United States) Laurence Piturro
- (England) David Price*
- (United States) Rodney Rambo*
- (England) Paul Riley
- (United States) Travis Rinker*
- (England) Paul Robson
- (United States) Jim Rooney*
- (Venezuela) Giovanni Savarese*
- (United States) Jack Stefanowski
- (United States) Gary Sullivan
- (Guinea) Moussa Sy
- (Brazil) Tadeu Terra
- (United States) Guillermo Valencia
- (United States) Jesse Van Saun*
- (United States) Danny Vitiello
- (United States) Cordt Weinstein*
- (United States) John Wolyniec *
- (Jamaica) Hector Wright *
- (United States) Jeff Zaun*

== Year-by-year ==
Year	Division	League	Regular season	Playoffs	Open Cup
1994	3	USISL	1st, Northeast	Sizzling Nine	did not enter
1995	3	USISL Pro League	1st, Coastal	Champion	did not qualify
1996	3	USISL Select League	1st, North Atlantic	Semifinals	did not qualify
1997	2	USISL A-League	3rd, Northeast	Division Finals	Quarterfinals
1998	2	USISL A-League	4th, Northeast	Conference Quarterfinals	did not qualify
1999	2	USL A-League	3rd, Northeast	Conference Quarterfinals	did not qualify
2000	2	USL A-League	1st, Northeast	Conference Quarterfinals	did not qualify
2001	2	USL A-League	6th, Northern	did not qualify	did not qualify
2002	3	USL D3-Pro League	1st, Atlantic	Champion	did not qualify
2003	3	USL Pro Select League	1st, Atlantic	Regional Finals	2nd round
2004	3	USL Pro Soccer League	3rd, Atlantic	did not qualify	did not qualify
2005	3	USL Second Division	6th	did not qualify	2nd round
2006	3	USL Second Division	9th	did not qualify	did not qualify
2007	4	USL PDL	4th, Northeast	did not qualify	1st round
2008	4	USL PDL	3rd, Northeast	did not qualify	did not qualify
2009	4	USL PDL	2nd, Northeast	Divisional Semifinals	did not qualify
2010	4	USL PDL	4th, Northeast	did not qualify	2nd round
2011	4	USL PDL	1st, Mid Atlantic	National Semifinals	did not qualify
2012	4	USL PDL	5th, Mid Atlantic	did not qualify	2nd round
2013	4	USL PDL	3rd, Mid Atlantic	did not qualify	did not qualify
2014	4	USL PDL	3rd, Mid Atlantic	did not qualify	did not qualify
2015	4	USL PDL	2nd, Mid Atlantic	Divisional Playoff	2nd round
2016	4	USL PDL	3rd, Northeast	did not qualify	1st round
2017	4	USL PDL	2nd, Northeast	Conference Finals	did not qualify
2018	4	USL PDL	3rd, Mid Atlantic	did not qualify	2nd round
2019	4	USL League Two	3rd, Mid Atlantic	did not qualify	did not qualify
2020	4	USL League Two	Season cancelled due to COVID-19 pandemic		
2021	4	USL League Two	1st, Metropolitan	Conference Quarterfinals	did not qualify
2022	4	USL League Two	2nd, Metropolitan	National Finals	did not qualify
2023	4	USL League Two	1st, Metropolitan	Conference Quarterfinals	did not qualify
2024	4	USL League Two	1st, Metropolitan	Conference Quarterfinals	did not qualify
2025	4	USL League Two	2nd, Metropolitan	Conference Qualifying Round	did not qualify
2026	4	USL League Two	3rd, Metropolitan	did not qualify	did not qualify

== Honors ==
- USISL Northeast Conference Champions 1994
- USISL Pro League Coastal Conference Champions 1995
- USISL Pro League Champions 1995
- USISL Select League North Atlantic Conference Champions 1996
- USL A-League Northeast Conference Champions 2000
- USL D3-Pro League Atlantic Conference Champions 2002
- USL D3-Pro League Champions 2002
- USL Pro Select League Atlantic Conference Champions 2003
- USL PDL Mid Atlantic Division Champions 2011
- USL PDL Eastern Conference Champions 2011
- USL League Two Metropolitan Division Champions 2021, 2023, 2024
- USL League Two Eastern Conference Champions 2022
- USL League Two Runners Up 2022

== Staff ==
Position	Staff
Head Coach	Tom Bowen
Assistant Coach	Scott Leamey
Sporting Director	Stephen Roche

Last updated: August 2018
Source: Long Island Rough Riders Official Website

== Stadium ==
- Mitchel Athletic Complex; Uniondale, New York, 1 game (2021) Full Time (2003–2006) (2022–present)
- Motamed Field at Adelphi University; Garden City, New York, 4 games (2021)
- Hofstra University Soccer Stadium (2018–2020) 2 games (2021)
- Cy Donnelly Stadium at St. Anthony's High School; South Huntington, New York (2009–17)
- Stadium at MacArthur High School; Levittown, New York, 2 games (2010–11) 1 game (2016)
- Michael Tully Field; New Hyde Park, New York (2007–08) 1 game (2018)
- Belson Stadium; Jamaica, New York, 1 game (2007)
- Stadium at Stony Brook University; Stony Brook, New York, 4 games (2005–06)
- Citibank Park; Central Islip, New York, 2 games (2003)

== Average attendance ==
Attendance stats are calculated by averaging each team's self-reported home attendances from the historical match archive at https://web.archive.org/web/20100105175057/http://www.uslsoccer.com/history/index_E.html.%7B%7BOriginal and Kenn.com https://kenn.com/blog/soccer/all-time-usl-third-division-attendance/, https://kenn.com/blog/soccer/all-time-second-division-attendance/, and https://kenn.com/blog/soccer/all-time-usl-league-two-attendance/

- 1994: 3,600
- 1995: 3,823
- 1996: 3,023
- 1997: 4,147
- 1998: 3,143
- 1999: 2,788
- 2000: 1,973
- 2001: 1,098
- 2002: 776
- 2003: 739
- 2004: 2,104
- 2005: 1,996
- 2006: 1,781
- 2007: 558 (17th in PDL)
- 2008: 628 or 750 (12th in PDL)
- 2009: 510 (21st in PDL)
- 2010: 423 or 407 (27th in PDL)
- 2011: 453 (24th in PDL)
- 2012: 400 or 364 (27th in PDL)
- 2013: 468 or 824 (13th in PDL)
- 2014: 525 or 661 (14th in PDL)
- 2015: 515 (15th in PDL)
