= Derrick Etienne (footballer, born 1974) =

Haitian footballer

Personal information
- Date of birth: 11 August 1974 (age 52)
- Place of birth: Nyack, New York
- Position: Forward

College career
Years	Team	Apps	(Gls)
1995–1997	VCU Rams	37	(12)

Senior career*
Years	Team	Apps	(Gls)
1998–2000	Richmond Kickers	53	(6)
2001–2006	Long Island Rough Riders	118	(51)

International career
2000	Haiti	8	(1)
- * Club domestic league appearances and goals

Derrick Etienne (born 11 August 1974) is a Haitian former professional footballer.

== Career ==
Etienne played for the Richmond Kickers and Long Island Rough Riders. While with the Rough Riders, Etienne helped lead the club to a 1st place finish in the Atlantic Division and the D-3 Pro League National Championship in 2002. In the championship game against the Wilmington Hammerheads, the Rough Riders held a 1–1 tie until the 82nd minute, when Etienne scored the winning goal. In 2003 Etienne was named to the USL All League Team.

While with the Haitian National Team, he made appearances in various competitions, including the Gold Cup, Caribbean Cup, International Friendlies, and World Cup Qualifying.

== Personal ==
He is the brother of Darrell Etienne and father of Darice Etienne, Derrick Etienne Jr., and Danielle Etienne.

== Statistics ==
Club	Season	League		Total	
Club	Season	Apps	Goals	Apps	Goals
Richmond Kickers	1998	22	5	22	5
Richmond Kickers	1999	19	1	19	1
Richmond Kickers	2000	12	0	12	0
Long Island Rough Riders	2001	24	4	24	4
Long Island Rough Riders	2002	20	15	20	15
Long Island Rough Riders	2003	18	10	18	10
Long Island Rough Riders	2004	18	11	18	11
Long Island Rough Riders	2005	20	9	20	9
Long Island Rough Riders	2006	18	2	18	2

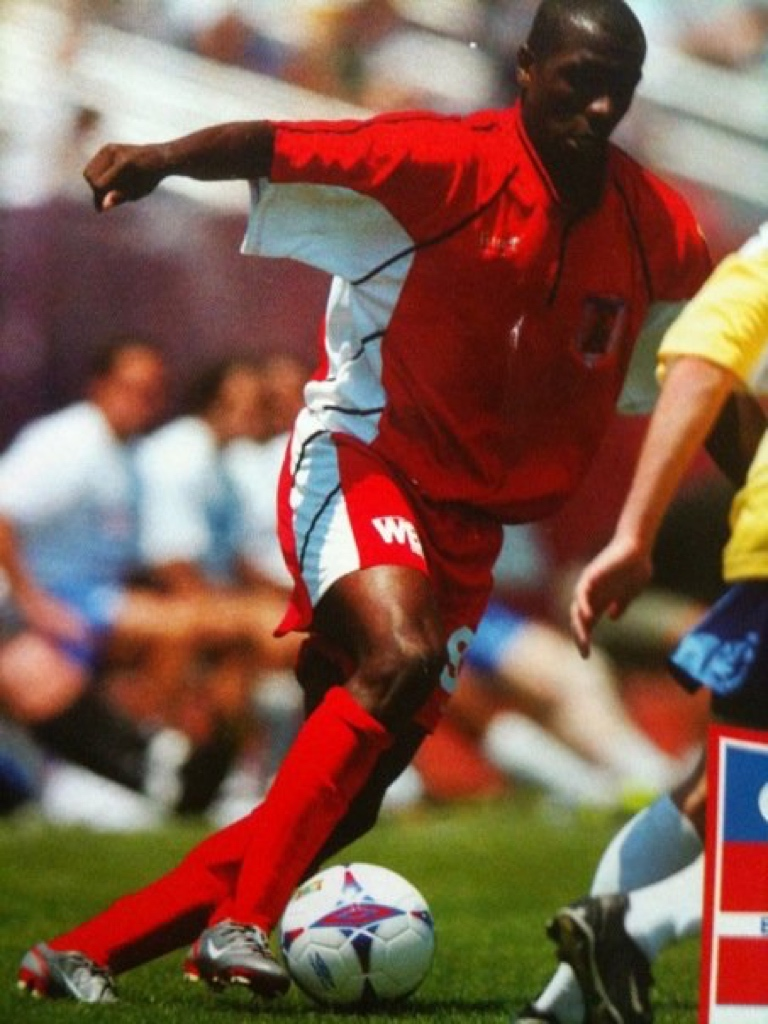
Derrick Etienne with Long Island Roughriders in 2002.

== Honors ==
=== Club ===
Long Island Rough Riders

- 2002 USISL D-3 Pro League
