= Western Mass Pioneers =

- Full name: Western Mass Pioneers
- Nickname: Pioneers
- Founded: 1998; 28 years ago
- Stadium: Lusitano Stadium; Ludlow, Massachusetts
- Capacity: 3,000
- Owner: Celso Correia
- Head Coach: Federico Molinari
- League: USL League Two
- 2024: 2nd, Northeast Division; Playoffs: Conference Quarterfinals
- Website: wmpioneers.com
Home colors

Western Mass Pioneers is an American soccer team based in Ludlow, Massachusetts, United States. Founded in 1998, the team plays in USL League Two, the fourth tier of the American soccer pyramid.

The team plays its home games at Lusitano Stadium, where they have played since 1998. The team's colors are red, black and white.

== History ==
In August 1997, the USISL announced it had awarded an expansion franchise to Gremio Lusitano, an amateur soccer club based in Ludlow, Massachusetts. The USISL had set a condition for new teams which prohibited ethnic team names which prevented the club from using the name Gremio or Lusitano. Therefore, the region's newspaper, the Springfield Union-News, held a week-long "name the team" contest which resulted in the selection of Pioneers. In October 1997, general manager Rick Andre named Leszek Wrona, who had both played for and coached Gremio Lusitano, as head coach of the Pioneers. In September 1999, the Pioneers expressed an interest in moving up to the A-League after winning the USL D-3 Pro League. However, the team elected to remain in the D-3 Pro League. In 2001, John Voight replaced Wrona has head coach. Wrona would return in 2005, leave in 2007 and return again in 2008. By 2003, the team was fielding ten Junior Pioneer youth teams which competed in the Super Y-League. Through all these years, the team has remained under the ownership of Gremio Lusitano.

On December 22, 2009, following the exodus of teams from the USL to the new North American Soccer League, the Pioneers announced that they would self-relegate, and play in the USL Premier Development League in 2010.

== Players ==
=== Notable former players ===
This list of notable former players comprises players who went on to play professional soccer after playing for the team in the Premier Development League, or those who previously played professionally before joining the team.

- (Grenada) Anthony Augustine
- (United States) Steve Covino
- (Brazil) Mateus dos Anjos
- (United States) Paul Kelly
- (United States) Joe Germanese
- (Cape Verde) Jair
- (England) Matt Jones
- (Ecuador) Martin Klinger
- (England) Yan Klukowski
- (United States) Tommy McNamara
- (United States) Bobby Shuttleworth
- (United States) Mike Lima
- (United States) David Mahoney
- (United States) Ryan Malone
- (United States) Brandon Tyler
- (Canada) Adam Wallace
- (United States) Jay Willis
- (United States) Patrick Agyemang
- (United States) Alec Hughes

== Year-by-year ==
Year	Level	League	Reg. season	Playoffs	U.S. Open Cup
1998	3	USISL D-3 Pro League	3rd, Northeast	Division Semifinals	2nd Round
1999	3	USL D-3 Pro League	1st, Northern	Champion	did not qualify
2000	3	USL D-3 Pro League	5th, Northern	Conference Finals	did not qualify
2001	3	USL D-3 Pro League	7th, Northern	did not qualify	did not qualify
2002	3	USL D-3 Pro League	1st, Northern	Quarterfinals	did not qualify
2003	3	USL Pro Select League	3rd, Northern	did not qualify	did not qualify
2004	3	USL Pro Soccer League	3rd, Northern	did not qualify	2nd Round
2005	3	USL Second Division	1st	Final	3rd Round
2006	3	USL Second Division	6th	did not qualify	did not qualify
2007	3	USL Second Division	6th	did not qualify	2nd Round
2008	3	USL Second Division	6th	Quarterfinals	2nd Round
2009	3	USL Second Division	7th	did not qualify	2nd Round
2010	4	USL PDL	6th, Northeast	did not qualify	did not qualify
2011	4	USL PDL	3rd, Northeast	did not qualify	1st Round
2012	4	USL PDL	3rd, Northeast	did not qualify	did not qualify
2013	4	USL PDL	4th, Northeast	did not qualify	did not qualify
2014	4	USL PDL	3rd, Northeast	did not qualify	2nd Round
2015	4	USL PDL	5th, Northeast	did not qualify	1st Round
2016	4	USL PDL	2nd, Northeast	Divisional Playoff	did not qualify
2017	4	USL PDL	3rd, Northeast	did not qualify	1st Round
2018	4	USL PDL	3rd, Northeast	did not qualify	1st Round
2019	4	USL League Two	1st, Northeast	Conference Final	did not qualify
2020	4	Season cancelled due to COVID-19 pandemic			
2021	4	USL League Two	1st, Northeast	National Semifinals	did not qualify
2022	4	USL League Two	2nd, Northeast	Conference Semifinals	2nd Round
2023	4	USL League Two	2nd, Northeast	Conference Quarterfinals	did not qualify
2024	4	USL League Two	2nd, Northeast	Conference Quarterfinals	1st Round
2025	4	USL League Two	2nd, Northeast	Conference Quarterfinals	did not qualify
2026	4	USL League Two	3rd, Northeast	did not qualify	did not qualify

== Honors ==
- USL League Two Eastern Conference Champions 2021
- USL League Two Northeast Division Champions 2019, 2021

- USL D-3 Pro League Champions 1999
- USL D-3 Pro League Northern Division Champions 1999, 2002
- USL Second Division Regular Season Champions 2005

== Head coaches ==
- (Poland) Leszek Wrona (1998–2001, 2004–2006, 2008–2010)
- (United States) John Voight (2002–2003)
- (United States) Tom d'Agostino (2007)
- (United States) Joe Calabrese (2011)
- (Argentina) Federico Molinari (2012–present)

== Stadia ==
- Lusitano Stadium, Ludlow, Massachusetts (1998–present)

== Attendances ==
Attendance stats are calculated by averaging each team's self-reported home attendances from Kenn.com https://kenn.com/blog/soccer/all-time-usl-third-division-attendance/

https://kenn.com/blog/soccer/all-time-usl-league-two-attendance/

- 1998: 2,004
- 1999: 2,430 Playoffs: 3,975 Overall: 2,842
- 2000: 2,313 Playoffs: 4,041 Overall: 2,601
- 2001: 2,385
- 2002: 1,992 Playoffs: 3,422 Overall: 2,122
- 2003: 1,496
- 2004: 1,280
- 2005: 1,790 Playoffs: 3,846 Overall: 2,132
- 2006: 1,230
- 2007: 2,041
- 2008: 1,787
- 2009: 1,838
- 2010: 765 (14th in PDL)
- 2011: 795 (13th in PDL)
- 2012: 896 (9th in PDL)
- 2013: 1,058 (11th in PDL)
- 2014: 910 (12th in PDL)
- 2015: 654 (11th in PDL)
- 2016: NA
- 2017: NA
- 2018: NA
- 2019: NA
- 2021: NA Playoffs:NA
- 2022: NA Playoffs:NA
- 2023: NA
- 2024: NA Playoffs:NA
- 2025: NA Playoffs:NA
