= Cordt Weinstein =

American soccer player

Personal information
- Full name: Cordt Weinstein
- Date of birth: March 2, 1972 (age 54)
- Place of birth: Deer Park, New York, United States
- Height: 5 ft 6 in (1.68 m)
- Position: Striker

College career
Years	Team	Apps	(Gls)
1990–1992	Southern Connecticut Owls		

Senior career*
Years	Team	Apps	(Gls)
1994–2003	Long Island Rough Riders		
1996	→ New York Fever (loan)	8	(3)
2001	→ MetroStars (loan)	2	(0)
- * Club domestic league appearances and goals

Cordt Weinstein (born March 2, 1972) is an American professional soccer coach and former player who played as a striker.

He spent nine seasons with the Long Island Rough Riders and also played with the MetroStars in Major League Soccer.

== Playing career ==
Weinstein attended Southern Connecticut State University, playing on the men's soccer team from 1989 to 1993. In 1990 and 1992, Weinstein and his team mates won the NCAA Division II Men's Soccer Championship.

In 1994, Weinstein signed with the Long Island Rough Riders of the USISL. In 1996, the Rough Riders loaned Weinstein to the New York Fever of the A-League for the months of August and September. In 2001, Weinstein was loaned to MetroStars.

== Coaching career ==
In 1993, Weinstein became an assistant coach at St. John the Baptist Diocesan High School in West Islip, New York. He was elevated to head coach in 2002.

== Statistics ==
Club performance			League		Cup		League Cup		Continental		Total	
Season	Club	League	Apps	Goals	Apps	Goals	Apps	Goals	Apps	Goals	Apps	Goals
USA			League		Open Cup		League Cup		North America		Total	
2001	MetroStars (loan)	MLS	2	0	0	0	0	0	0	0	2	0
Career total			2	0	0	0	0	0	0	0	2	0
