= George Corrie (footballer) =

English footballer

Personal information
- Date of birth: 16 September 1973 (age 53)
- Place of birth: Workington, England
- Position: Defender

Senior career*
Years	Team	Apps	(Gls)
–	Workington	0	(0)
1999–2009	Wilmington Hammerheads	144	(16)
- * Club domestic league appearances and goals

George Corrie (born 16 September 1973) is an English footballer, born in Workington, who played for ten years as a midfielder for American USL Second Division side Wilmington Hammerheads, of which he was the captain. He joined the Hammerheads in 1999 after six seasons with Conference North team Workington A.F.C.
