= New Jersey Stallions =

- Full name: New Jersey Stallions
- Nickname: The Stallions
- Founded: 1996
- Stadium: DePaul Catholic HS Stadium
- Chairman: (United States) Rich Gentile
- League: USL Premier Development League
- 2004: 7th, Northeast Division
Home colours	Away colours

The New Jersey Stallions were an American soccer team, founded in 1996, which competed in various divisions of the United Soccer Leagues until 2004, after which the team left the league and the franchise was terminated. The club originally started in 1996 as the New York/New Jersey Stallions in the original USISL Select League, before moving to Toms River, New Jersey and becoming the New Jersey Stallions in 1999. They moved to Union Township, Union County, New Jersey in 2000, and then to Wayne, New Jersey in 2003, before demoting themselves to the USL PDL for the 2004 season, their final one in competition.

They played their final home games in the stadium at DePaul Catholic High School in Wayne, New Jersey, 19 miles north of the state’s largest city, Newark. The team's colors were blue, white and black.

== Year-by-year ==
Year	Division	League	Reg. season	Playoffs	Open Cup
1996	2	USISL Select League	6th, North Atlantic	Did not qualify	Did not qualify
1997	3	USISL D-3 Pro League	4th, Mid-Atlantic	Division Finals	Did not qualify
1998	3	USISL D-3 Pro League	3rd, Mid-Atlantic	Division Semifinals	Did not qualify
1999	3	USL D-3 Pro League	4th, Northern	Conference Semifinals	1st Round
2000	3	USL D-3 Pro League	1st, Northern	Final	2nd Round
2001	3	USL D-3 Pro League	3rd, Northern	Conference Finals	2nd Round
2002	3	USL D-3 Pro League	3rd, Atlantic	Did not qualify	1st Round
2003	3	USL Pro Select League	2nd, Atlantic	Semifinals	Did not qualify
2004	4	USL PDL	7th, Northeast	Did not qualify	Did not qualify

== Honors ==
- USL D-3 Pro League Northern Division Champions 2000

== Stadia ==
- Stadium at DePaul Catholic High School, Wayne, New Jersey 2004

== Notable players ==
- Giuseppe Rossi
- Andrian Gómez
- Juan Lo
- Daniel Campos
- Frantz Jean-Charles
- Matt Miazga
- Marcelo Fracchia
- Frank Giuliano
- Travis Morrow
