= 2021 FC Dallas season =

FC Dallas
2021 season
- Owner: Clark and Dan Hunt
- Head coach: Luchi Gonzalez (until September); Marco Ferruzzi (September – November)
- Stadium: Toyota Stadium
- MLS: Conference: 11th Overall: 23rd
- MLS Cup Playoffs: Did not qualify
- U.S. Open Cup: Cancelled
- Top goalscorer: League: Ricardo Pepi (13); All: Ricardo Pepi (13)
- Highest home attendance: 19,096 (July 4 vs. Vancouver Whitecaps FC)
- Lowest home attendance: 8,621 (Multiple games)
- Average home league attendance: 13,418
- Biggest win: 4–0 (July 24 vs. LA Galaxy)
- Biggest defeat: 0–3 (May 29 at Colorado Rapids)
Primary colors	Secondary colors

The 2021 FC Dallas season was the club's 26th season in Major League Soccer, the top tier of American soccer. On September 19, Luchi Gonzalez was relieved of duties as head coach. Marco Ferruzzi served as interim head coach for the remainder of the 2021 season.

== Transfers ==
=== In ===
No.	Pos.	Nat.	Name	Age	Moving from	Type	Transfer window	Ends	Transfer fee	Source
3	DF	(Spain)	José Antonio Martínez Gil	27	SD Eibar (Spain)	Transfer	Pre-season	Undisclosed	Allocation money	
7	MF	(Colombia)	Jáder Obrian	25	Rionegro Águilas (Colombia)	Transfer	Pre-season	Undisclosed	Allocation money	
21	MF	(United States)	Kalil ElMedkhar	21	Philadelphia Union (United States)	Transfer	Pre-season	Undisclosed	Allocation money	
17	MF	(Venezuela)	Freddy Vargas	21	Deportivo Lara (Venezuela)	Loan	Pre-season	Undisclosed	Undisclosed	
33	MF	(United States)	Nicky Hernandez	22	Southern Methodist University (United States)	Signed Draft Pick	Pre-season	Undisclosed	Undisclosed	
11	FW	(Hungary)	Szabolcs Schön	20	MTK Budapest (Hungary)	Transfer	Pre-season	Undisclosed	Undisclosed	
28	FW	(Bosnia and Herzegovina)	Beni Redžić	18	North Texas SC/FC Dallas Academy (United States)	Transfer	Pre-season	Undisclosed	HGP contract	
32	DF	(United States)	Collin Smith	17	North Texas SC/FC Dallas Academy (United States)	Transfer	Mid-season	Undisclosed	HGP contract	
5	MF	(Argentina)	Facundo Quignon	28	Lanús (Argentina)	Transfer	Mid-season	Undisclosed	Undisclosed	
44	DF	(Guinea-Bissau)	Caiser Gomes	21	North Texas SC (United States)	Loan	Mid-season	Undisclosed	Undisclosed	

==== Draft picks ====
Round	Selection	Pos.	Name	College	Signed	Source
1	15	MF	(United States) Nicky Hernandez	SMU	Signed	
2	48	GK	(United States) Colin Shutler	Virginia	Signed with North Texas SC	
3	75	FW	(France) Thibaut Jacquel	Campbell University	Signed with North Texas SC	
3	76	DF	(United States) Mark Salas	North Carolina	Signed with North Texas SC	
3	79	FW	(United States) Giovanni Montesdeoca	North Carolina	Signed with Loudoun United FC	

=== Out ===
No.	Pos.	Nat.	Name	Age	Moving to	Type	Transfer window	Transfer fee	Source
10	MF	(Chile)	Pablo Aránguiz	23	Club Universidad de Chile	Transfer	Pre-season	Undisclosed	
40	GK	(United States)	Carlos Avilez	21	South Georgia Tormenta FC (United States)	Option Declined	Pre-season	Free	
3	DF	(Switzerland)	Reto Ziegler	34	FC Lugano (Switzerland)	Out of Contract	Pre-season	Free	
11	MF	(Colombia)	Santiago Mosquera	25	C.F. Pachuca (Mexico)	Option Declined	Pre-season	Free	
17	FW	(Ghana)	Francis Atuahene	24	Memphis 901 FC (United States)	Option Declined	Pre-season	Free	
25	FW	(Canada)	Callum Montgomery	23	Minnesota United FC (United States)	Trade	Pre-season	2022 fourth-round pick and allocation money	
9	MF	(United States)	Fafà Picault	29	Houston Dynamo FC (United States)	Trade	Pre-season	2021 and 2022 allocation money	
21	MF	(Colombia)	Michael Barrios	29	Colorado Rapids (United States)	Trade	Pre-season	International roster spot and exchange of 2021 first round picks	
14	DF	(United States)	Bryan Reynolds	19	A.S. Roma (Italy)	Transfer	Pre-season	Six-month loan before completing a permanent transfer.	
5	MF	(Brazil)	Tiago Santos	31	Grêmio (Brazil)	Transfer	Pre-season	Undisclosed	
15	MF	(United States)	Tanner Tessmann	19	Venezia F.C. (Italy)	Transfer	Mid-season	Undisclosed	

== Club ==
=== Roster ===
As of July 21, 2021. Note: Flags indicate national team as defined under FIFA eligibility rules; some limited exceptions apply. Players may hold more than one non-FIFA nationality.

No.	Pos.	Nation	Player
2	DF	USA	Eddie Munjoma (HGP)
3	DF	ESP	José Martínez
4	DF	BRA	Bressan
5	MF	ARG	Facundo Quignon
6	MF	USA	Edwin Cerrillo (HGP)
7	MF	COL	Jáder Obrian
8	MF	HON	Bryan Acosta (DP)
9	FW	USA	Jesús Ferreira (HGP)
10	MF	COL	Andrés Ricaurte (on loan from Independiente Medellín)
11	FW	HUN	Szabolcs Schön
12	MF	USA	Ryan Hollingshead
14	DF	USA	Nkosi Tafari
16	FW	USA	Ricardo Pepi (HGP)
17	MF	VEN	Freddy Vargas (on loan from Deportivo Lara)
18	MF	USA	Brandon Servania (HGP)

No.	Pos.	Nation	Player
19	MF	USA	Paxton Pomykal (HGP)
20	GK	USA	Jimmy Maurer
21	MF	USA	Kalil ElMedkhar
22	FW	GHA	Ema Twumasi
24	DF	USA	Matt Hedges
26	DF	USA	John Nelson (GA)
28	FW	BIH	Beni Redžić (HGP)
29	FW	ARG	Franco Jara (DP)
30	GK	USA	Kyle Zobeck
32	DF	USA	Collin Smith (HGP)
44	DF	GNB	Caiser Gomes (on loan from North Texas SC)
46	DF	USA	Justin Che (HGP)
80	MF	USA	Nicky Hernandez
99	GK	BRA	Phelipe Megiolaro (on loan from Grêmio)

=== Out on loan ===
Note: Flags indicate national team as defined under FIFA eligibility rules; some limited exceptions apply. Players may hold more than one non-FIFA nationality.

No.	Pos.	Nation	Player
23	MF	USA	Thomas Roberts (HGP) (on loan to SK Austria Klagenfurt)
31	FW	USA	Dante Sealy (HGP) (on loan to PSV Eindhoven U-23)

== Competitions ==
=== Preseason ===
March 13, 2021	Red	1–0	Blue	Frisco, Texas
11:00 a.m. CST (UTC-06)	Nelson 2nd half'	Report		Stadium: Camry Field at Toyota Stadium
Note: Intrasquad scrimmage, played in two 30-minute halves.

March 20, 2021	FC Dallas	4–0	OKC Energy FC	Frisco, Texas
2:00 p.m. CDT (UTC-05)	Vargas 9' (Acosta); ElMedkhar 67' (Martinez); Pepi 74', 84' (Roberts)	Report		Stadium: Camry Field at Toyota Stadium
Note: Played in three 30-minute periods

March 24, 2021	FC Dallas	3–0	Austin Bold FC	Frisco, Texas
1:00 p.m. CDT (UTC-05)	15' (o.g.); Jara 75'; Vargas 81'	Report		Stadium: Toyota Stadium

March 27, 2021	San Antonio FC	0–0 (4–5 p)	FC Dallas	San Antonio, Texas
1:00 p.m. CDT (UTC-05)	PC (yellow card) 14'; Dhillon (yellow card) 40'; Lindley (yellow card) 53'	Report	Obrian (yellow card) 36'	Stadium: Toyota Field
	Penalties
	Doyle (penalty scored); Bernal (penalty scored); Tyrpak (penalty scored); Lincon (penalty missed); Academy Player (penalty scored); Academy Player (penalty missed)		Pepi (penalty missed); Nelson (penalty scored); ElMedkhar (penalty scored); Hernandez (penalty scored); Sealy (penalty scored); Megiolaro (penalty scored)

April 2, 2021 La Copita	FC Dallas	5–0	San Antonio FC	Frisco, Texas
11:00 a.m. CDT (UTC-05)	Jara 7' (Obrian); 19' (o.g.); Hollingshead 49' (Vargas); Obrian 52', 68' (Ricuarte)	Report		Stadium: Toyota Stadium

April 7, 2021 La Copita	FC Dallas	3–3 (4–2 p)	Austin FC	Frisco, Texas
4:00 p.m. CDT (UTC-05)	Vargas 10'; Hedges 35'; Ferreira 84'	Report	Stroud 50'; Fagúndez 53' (pen.); Domínguez 73'	Stadium: Toyota Stadium

April 10, 2021 La Copita	Houston Dynamo FC	0–3	FC Dallas	Houston, Texas
4:00 p.m. CDT (UTC-05)		Report	Jara 37'; Hollingshead 41'; Ferreira 84'	Stadium: BBVA Compass Stadium

=== MLS ===
==== Western Conference standings ====
Western Conference

Pos	Team	Pld	W	L	T	GF	GA	GD	Pts
9	Los Angeles FC	34	12	13	9	53	51	+2	45
10	San Jose Earthquakes	34	10	13	11	46	54	−8	41
11	FC Dallas	34	7	15	12	47	56	−9	33
12	Austin FC	34	9	21	4	35	56	−21	31
13	Houston Dynamo FC	34	6	16	12	36	54	−18	30

Source: MLS
Rules for classification: 1) points; 2) total wins; 3) total goal differential; 4) total goals scored; 5) fewer disciplinary points; 6) away goal differential; 7) away goals scored; 8) home goals differential; 9) home goals scored; 10) coin toss (2 clubs tied) or drawing of lots (≥3 clubs tied)

==== Overall standings ====
Pos	Team	Pld	W	L	T	GF	GA	GD	Pts
21	San Jose Earthquakes	34	10	13	11	46	54	−8	41
22	Chicago Fire FC	34	9	18	7	36	54	−18	34
23	FC Dallas	34	7	15	12	47	56	−9	33
24	Austin FC	34	9	21	4	35	56	−21	31
25	Houston Dynamo FC	34	6	16	12	36	54	−18	30

Source: MLS
Rules for classification: 1) points; 2) total wins; 3) total goal differential; 4) total goals scored; 5) fewer disciplinary points; 6) away goal differential; 7) away goals scored; 8) home goals differential; 9) home goals scored; 10) coin toss (2 clubs tied) or drawing of lots (≥3 clubs tied)

==== Results summary ====
Overall								Home						Away					
Pld	W	D	L	GF	GA	GD	Pts	W	D	L	GF	GA	GD	W	D	L	GF	GA	GD
34	7	12	15	47	56	−9	33	5	7	5	25	21	+4	2	5	10	22	35	−13

Last updated: November 7, 2021.
Source: Regular Season

==== Results by round ====
Round	1	2	3	4	5	6	7	8	9	10	11	12	13	14	15	16	17	18	19	20	21	22	23	24	25	26	27	28	29	30	31	32	33	34
Stadium	H	A	H	H	A	H	A	H	A	H	H	A	A	A	H	A	A	H	H	H	A	A	A	H	A	A	A	H	H	H	A	H	H	A
Result	D	L	W	D	L	D	L	D	L	W	D	L	L	L	W	W	D	W	L	L	D	W	L	D	D	L	L	L	D	L	D	L	W	D

Updated to match(es) played on November 7, 2021. Source: Regular Season
A = Away; H = Home; W = Win; D = Draw; L = Loss

==== Regular season ====
Kickoff times are in CDT (UTC-05) unless shown otherwise

April 17, 2021 1	FC Dallas	0–0	Colorado Rapids	Frisco, Texas
7:00 p.m. CDT (UTC-05)		Report	Bassett (yellow card) 87'	Stadium: Toyota Stadium; Attendance: 8,621; Referee: Nima Saghafi

April 24, 2021 2	San Jose Earthquakes	3–1	FC Dallas	San Jose, California
2:30 p.m. CDT (UTC-05)	Alanis 34' (pen.); López (yellow card) 45'; Espinoza 49'; Fierro (yellow card) 53'; Cowell 59'; Salinas (yellow card) 75'; Wondolowski (red card) 89'; Remedi (yellow card) 90+4'	Report	Hollingshead (yellow card) 16'; Acosta (yellow card) 25'; Tessman (yellow card) 33'; Pepi 79'	Stadium: PayPal Park; Referee: Timothy Ford

May 1, 2021 3	FC Dallas	4–1	Portland Timbers	Frisco, Texas
7:00 p.m. CDT (UTC-05)	Ricaurte 2' (yellow card) 82'; Munjoma (yellow card) 12'; Obrian 14'; Bressan 45+3'; Hollingshead (yellow card) 78'; Sealy 85'	Report	Williamson 62'; Bodily (yellow card) 69'; Valeri (yellow card) 87'	Stadium: Toyota Stadium; Attendance: 8,621; Referee: Alan Kelly

May 8, 2021 4 Texas Derby	FC Dallas	1–1	Houston Dynamo FC	Frisco, Texas
2:30 p.m. CDT (UTC-05)	Bressan (yellow card) 34'; Obrian 42' (yellow card) 54'; Acosta (yellow card) 82'	Report	Picault 34' (pen.); Rodríguez (yellow card) 44'; Vera (yellow card) 44'; Corona (yellow card) 46'	Stadium: Toyota Stadium; Attendance: 8,749; Referee: Alex Chilowicz

May 15, 2021 5	Minnesota United FC	1–0	FC Dallas	Saint Paul, Minnesota
7:00 p.m. CDT (UTC-05)	Trapp (yellow card) 67'; Lod 90+4'	Report	Ricaurte (yellow card) 10'; Jara (yellow card) 60'	Stadium: Allianz Field; Attendance: 4,100; Referee: Ted Unkel

May 22, 2021 6	FC Dallas	2–2	Real Salt Lake	Frisco, Texas
7:00 p.m. CDT (UTC-05)	Ricaurte (yellow card) 24'; Jara 43' (pen.); Bressan (yellow card) 64'; Hollingshead 84'	Report	Rubin 20'; Kreilach 86'; Glad (yellow card) 89'; Herrera (yellow card) 90+2'; Rusnák (yellow card) 90+4'	Stadium: Toyota Stadium; Attendance: 8,621; Referee: Joseph Dickerson

May 29, 2021 7	Colorado Rapids	3–0	FC Dallas	Commerce City, Colorado
8:00 p.m. CDT (UTC-05)	Rosenberry 13'; Tessmann 41' (o.g.); Wilson (yellow card) 59'; Barrios (yellow card) 68' (goal) 71'; Price (yellow card) 80'; Yarbrough (yellow card) 83'	Report	Bressan (yellow card) 39'; Jara (yellow card) 59'	Stadium: Dick's Sporting Goods Park; Referee: Guido Gonzales Jr.

June 19, 2021 8	FC Dallas	1–1	Minnesota United FC	Frisco, Texas
7:30 p.m. CDT (UTC-05)	Pepi 68' (yellow card) 84'; Jara (yellow card) 89'	Report	Dibassy (yellow card) 2'; Fragapane 36'; Gasper (yellow card) 67'; Boxall (yellow card) 89'	Stadium: Toyota Stadium; Attendance: 16,455; Referee: Marcos de Oliveira

June 23, 2021 9	Los Angeles FC	2–0	FC Dallas	Los Angeles, California
9:30 p.m. CDT (UTC-05)	Vela 4'; Blessing 69'; Murillo (yellow card) 90'	Report	Bressan (yellow card) 60'; Vargas (yellow card) 80'; Ricaurte (yellow card) 84'	Stadium: Banc of California Stadium; Attendance: 22,510; Referee: Rosendo Mendoza

June 27, 2021 10	FC Dallas	2–1	New England Revolution	Frisco, Texas
8:00 p.m. CDT (UTC-05)	Pepi 11', 54'; Acosta (yellow card) 18'; Phelipe (yellow card) 41'; Obrian (yellow card) 71'; Twumasi (yellow card) 89'; Maurer (yellow card) 90+2'	Report	Polster (yellow card) 28'; Bou 33'; Bunbury (yellow card) 75'	Stadium: Toyota Stadium; Attendance: 14,889; Referee: Kevin Stott

July 4, 2021 11	FC Dallas	2–2	Vancouver Whitecaps FC	Frisco, Texas
7:30 p.m. CDT (UTC-05)	Obrian (yellow card) 18'; Pepi 22'; Acosta (yellow card) 67'; Veselinović 90+4' (o.g.)	Report	Cavallini 30', (yellow card) 40+3'; Rose 45+3'; Alexandre (yellow card) 72'; Metcalfe (yellow card) 90+1'; Nerwinski (yellow card) 90+5'	Stadium: Toyota Stadium; Attendance: 19,096; Referee: Ramy Touchan

July 7, 2021 12	LA Galaxy	3–1	FC Dallas	Carson, California
9:30 p.m. CDT (UTC-05)	Raveloson 17'; Cabral 27'; Zubak 51'; DePuy (yellow card) 66'	Report	Twumasi (yellow card) 54'; Cerrillo (yellow card) 57'; Jara 71'; Obrian (yellow card) 83'	Stadium: Dignity Health Sports Park; Attendance: 16,453; Referee: Alan Kelly

July 17, 2021 13	Portland Timbers	1–0	FC Dallas	Portland, Oregon
9:30 p.m. CDT (UTC-05)	Bonilla (yellow card) 5'; Župarić (yellow card) 52'; Ebobisse 84'	Report	Quignon (yellow card) 57'; Pomykal (yellow card) 69'	Stadium: Providence Park; Attendance: 23,255; Referee: Joseph Dickerson

July 21, 2021 14	Colorado Rapids	2–0	FC Dallas	Commerce City, Colorado
8:00 p.m. CDT (UTC-05)	Trusty (yellow card) 20'; Abubakar 48'; Barrios 55'; Warner (yellow card) 90+2'	Report	Cerrillo (yellow card) 34'; Quignon (yellow card) 43'	Stadium: Dick's Sporting Goods Park; Attendance: 8,321; Referee: Jon Freemon

July 24, 2021 15	FC Dallas	4–0	LA Galaxy	Frisco, Texas
7:30 p.m. CDT (UTC-05)	Ricaurte (yellow card) 18'; Pepi 27', 44', 50'; Maurer (yellow card) 78'; Obrian 88'	Report	Saldana (yellow card) 22'; Araujo (yellow card) 59'; Acosta (yellow card) 83'	Stadium: Toyota Stadium; Attendance: 14,812; Referee: Silviu Petrescu

July 31, 2021 16	Sporting Kansas City	1–2	FC Dallas	Kansas City, Kansas
7:30 p.m. CDT (UTC-05)	Sallói (yellow card) 68'; Russell 85'	Report	Pomykal 3'; Ferreira 51'; Twumasi (yellow card) 73'; Bressan (yellow card) 80'; Jara (yellow card) 84'; Hedges (yellow card) 90+1'	Stadium: Children's Mercy Park; Attendance: 19,975; Referee: Alex Chilowicz

August 4, 2021 17	Seattle Sounders FC	1–1	FC Dallas	Seattle, Washington
9:00 p.m. CDT (UTC-05)	Montero 72'; Smith (yellow card) 87'	Report	Jara 90+1'	Stadium: Lumen Field; Attendance: 31,628; Referee: Fotis Bazakos

August 7, 2021 18 Copa Tejas	FC Dallas	2–0	Austin FC	Frisco, Texas
7:30 p.m. CDT (UTC-05)	Bressan (yellow card) 42'; Hollingshead 50'; Ferreira 63'; Jara (yellow card) 90+4'	Report		Stadium: Toyota Stadium; Attendance: 16,625; Referee: Alan Kelly

August 14, 2021 19	FC Dallas	0–2	Sporting Kansas City	Frisco, Texas
7:30 p.m. CDT (UTC-05)	Ferreira (yellow card) 38'; Hedges (yellow card) 49'; Obrian (yellow card) 67'; Schön (yellow card) 68'; Vargas (yellow card) 76'; Twumasi (yellow card) 89'	Report	Pulido 12'; Sallói 63'; Kinda (yellow card) 90+1'	Stadium: Toyota Stadium; Attendance: 14,133; Referee: Armando Villarreal

August 18, 2021 20	FC Dallas	0–1	Seattle Sounders FC	Frisco, Texas
7:30 p.m. CDT (UTC-05)	Cerrillo (yellow card) 40'; Acosta (yellow card) 78'; Jara (yellow card) 90+3'	Report	Ruidíaz 63'	Stadium: Toyota Stadium; Attendance: 11,535; Referee: Robert Sibiga

August 21, 2021 21 Texas Derby	Houston Dynamo FC	2–2	FC Dallas	Houston, Texas
7:30 p.m. CDT (UTC-05)	Picault 25' (pen.); Vera 72'; Urruti (yellow card) 82'; Cerén (yellow card) 90+1'	Report	Cerrillo (yellow card) 15'; Schön (yellow card) 30'; Tafari 54'; Pepi 58'; Acosta (yellow card) 65'; Hedges (yellow card) 83'	Stadium: BBVA Stadium; Attendance: 13,548; Referee: Allen Chapman

August 29, 2021 22 Copa Tejas	Austin FC	3–5	FC Dallas	Austin, Texas
7:30 p.m. CDT (UTC-05)	Cascante 13'; Lima (yellow card) 25'; Fagúndez 59'; Ring 68'	Report	Ferreira 5', 38'; Schön (yellow card) 17'; Pepi 36', 40'; Obrian 53'; ElMedkhar (yellow card) 84'	Stadium: Q2 Stadium; Attendance: 20,738; Referee: Jair Marrufo

September 4, 2021 23	Real Salt Lake	3–2	FC Dallas	Sandy, Utah
7:00 p.m. CDT (UTC-05)	Glad 42'; Herrera (yellow card) 45+2'; Menéndez 54'; Rusnák (yellow card) 65', (goal) 73'	Report	Jara 19'; Obrian (yellow card) 25'; Tafari (yellow card) 49'; Ferreira 80'	Stadium: Rio Tinto Stadium; Attendance: 15,882; Referee: Baldomero Toledo

September 11, 2021 24	FC Dallas	1–1	San Jose Earthquakes	Frisco, Texas
7:30 p.m. CDT (UTC-05)	Hedges (yellow card) 4'; Servania (yellow card) 41'; Pepi 50'	Report	Alanís 6' (pen.); Cardoso (yellow card) 48'; Judson (yellow card) 59'	Stadium: Toyota Stadium; Attendance: 15,237; Referee: Guido Gonzales Jr.

September 14, 2021 25	New York City FC	3–3	FC Dallas	Harrison, New Jersey
6:30 p.m. CDT (UTC-05)	Moralez 20'; Medina 57'; Magno 67'; Andrade (red card) 90+2'	Report	Obrian 4', 73'; Ferreira 63'	Stadium: Red Bull Arena; Referee: Joseph Dickerson

September 18, 2021 26 Texas Derby	Houston Dynamo FC	3–2	FC Dallas	Houston, Texas
7:30 p.m. CDT (UTC-05)	Dorsey 5'; Picault 20'; Valentin (yellow card) 40'; Quintero 59' (pen.)	Report	Obrian 86', 90+4'; Schön (yellow card) 90+6'	Stadium: BBVA Stadium; Attendance: 12,353; Referee: Victor Rivas

September 25, 2021 27	Vancouver Whitecaps FC	1–0	FC Dallas	Vancouver, British Columbia
9:00 p.m. CDT (UTC-05)	White 20'; Gaspar (yellow card) 53'; Cavallini (yellow card) 58'	Report	Hedges (yellow card) 71'; Twumasi (yellow card) 82'; Acosta (yellow card) 90+1'	Stadium: BC Place; Referee: Kevin Stott

September 29, 2021 28	FC Dallas	1–3	Sporting Kansas City	Frisco, Texas
7:00 p.m. CDT (UTC-05)	Acosta (red card) 52'; Pepi 68'; Munjoma (yellow card) 81'	Report	Sallói 13', 61'; Russell 55' (pen.); Barber (yellow card) 90+5'	Stadium: Toyota Stadium; Attendance: 12,387; Referee: Jair Marrufo

October 2, 2021 29	FC Dallas	0–0	Minnesota United FC	Frisco, Texas
7:00 p.m. CDT (UTC-05)	Servania (yellow card) 16'	Report	Alonso (yellow card) 34'; Reynoso (red card) 89'	Stadium: Toyota Stadium; Attendance: 17,231; Referee: Rubiel Vazquez

October 20, 2021 30	FC Dallas	2–3	Los Angeles FC	Frisco, Texas
7:00 p.m. CDT (UTC-05)	Hollingshead 10' (yellow card) 72'; Jara 45'; Hedges (yellow card) 59'	Report	Arango 33' (pen.), 75', 79'; Cifuentes (yellow card) 67'; Musovski (yellow card) 89'	Stadium: Toyota Stadium; Attendance: 12,532; Referee: Chris Penso

October 23, 2021 31	LA Galaxy	2–2	FC Dallas	Carson, California
2:30 p.m. CDT (UTC-05)	Raveloson (yellow card) 4'; Chicharito 65' (pen.) (yellow card) 86'; Lletget 83'; DePuy (yellow card) 85'	Report	Ferriera 30'; Jara 41'; Obrian (yellow card) 66'; Pomykal (yellow card) 70'; Maurer (yellow card) 78'; Twumasi (yellow card) 89'; Bressan (yellow card) 90+5'	Stadium: Dignity Health Sports Park; Attendance: 15,136; Referee: Baldomero Toledo

October 27, 2021 32	FC Dallas	1–2	Real Salt Lake	Frisco, Texas
7:00 p.m. CDT (UTC-05)	Hedges 20'; Jara (yellow card) 57'	Report	Kreilach 80'; Rusnák 90'	Stadium: Toyota Stadium; Attendance: 12,486; Referee: Ismail Elfath

October 30, 2021 33 Copa Tejas	FC Dallas	2–1	Austin FC	Frisco, Texas
7:00 p.m. CDT (UTC-05)	Twumasi (yellow card) 22'; Ferreira 38'; Cerrillo (yellow card) 48'; Jara 80'	Report	Romaña (yellow card) 14'; Fagúndez 36' (yellow card) 83'; Jiménez (red card) 58'; Stuver (yellow card) 72'	Stadium: Toyota Stadium; Attendance: 16,080; Referee: Silviu Petrescu

November 7, 2021 34	San Jose Earthquakes	1–1	FC Dallas	San Jose, California
5:00 p.m. CDT (UTC-05)	Beason (yellow card) 28'; Wondolowski 34'; Vega (yellow card) 38'	Report	Obrian 42'; Cerrillo (yellow card) 53'; Pomykal (yellow card) 56'; Schön (yellow card) 74'	Stadium: PayPal Park; Referee: Victor Rivas

=== U.S. Open Cup ===
On July 20, US Soccer announced the tournament would be cancelled in 2021 and would resume for the 2022 season.

== Statistics ==
=== Appearances ===
Numbers outside parentheses denote appearances as starter.
Numbers in parentheses denote appearances as substitute.
Players with no appearances are not included in the list.

As of final match played November 7, 2021

No.	Pos.	Nat.	Name	MLS	Total
No.	Pos.	Nat.	Name	Apps	Apps
2	DF	USA	Eddie Munjoma	5(7)	5(7)
3	DF	ESP	José Martínez	16(3)	16(3)
4	DF	BRA	Bressan	20(2)	20(2)
5	MF	ARG	Facundo Quignón	16(2)	16(2)
6	MF	USA	Edwin Cerrillo	16(6)	16(6)
7	MF	COL	Jáder Obrian	25(9)	25(9)
8	MF	HON	Bryan Acosta	16(7)	16(7)
9	FW	USA	Jesús Ferreira	26(1)	26(1)
10	MF	COL	Andrés Ricaurte	9(17)	9(17)
11	MF	HUN	Szabolcs Schön	9(15)	9(15)
12	MF	USA	Ryan Hollingshead	30	30
14	DF	USA	Nkosi Tafari	21(1)	21(1)
16	FW	USA	Ricardo Pepi	24(7)	24(7)
17	MF	VEN	Freddy Vargas	7(6)	7(6)
18	MF	USA	Brandon Servania	11(3)	11(3)
19	MF	USA	Paxton Pomykal	18(13)	18(13)
20	GK	USA	Jimmy Maurer	24	24
21	MF	USA	Kalil ElMedkhar	(6)	(6)
22	FW	GHA	Ema Twumasi	19(4)	19(4)
24	DF	USA	Matt Hedges	16(4)	16(4)
26	DF	USA	John Nelson	6(4)	6(4)
29	FW	ARG	Franco Jara	11(17)	11(17)
31	FW	USA	Dante Sealy	(6)	(6)
32	DF	USA	Justin Che	12(3)	12(3)
99	GK	BRA	Phelipe	10(1)	10(1)
Player(s) exiting club mid-season that made appearance
15	MF	USA	Tanner Tessmann	6(1)	6(1)

=== Goals and assists ===
As of final match played November 7, 2021

No.	Pos.	Name	MLS	
No.	Pos.	Name	Goals	Assists
2	DF	(United States) Eddie Munjoma	0	1
4	DF	(Brazil) Bressan	1	0
6	MF	(United States) Edwin Cerrillo	0	1
7	MF	(Colombia) Jáder Obrian	9	4
8	MF	(Honduras) Bryan Acosta	0	2
9	FW	(United States) Jesús Ferreira	8	9
10	MF	(Colombia) Andrés Ricaurte	1	2
11	MF	(Hungary) Szabolcs Schön	0	6
12	MF	(United States) Ryan Hollingshead	3	5
14	DF	(United States) Nkosi Tafari	1	2
16	FW	(United States) Ricardo Pepi	13	3
18	MF	(United States) Brandon Servania	0	1
19	MF	(United States) Paxton Pomykal	1	2
22	FW	(Ghana) Ema Twumasi	0	1
24	DF	(United States) Matt Hedges	1	0
29	FW	(Argentina) Franco Jara	7	2
31	FW	(United States) Dante Sealy	1	0
32	DF	(United States) Justin Che	0	2
99	GK	(Brazil) Phelipe	0	1
			1	0
Total			47	44

=== Disciplinary record ===
As of final match played November 7, 2021
Player name(s) in italics transferred out mid-season.

No.	Pos.	Name	MLS	
No.	Pos.	Name	Booked	Sent off (straight red)
2	DF	(United States) Eddie Munjoma	2	0
4	DF	(Brazil) Bressan	7	0
5	MF	(Argentina) Facundo Quignón	2	0
6	MF	(United States) Edwin Cerrillo	6	0
7	MF	(Colombia) Jáder Obrian	7	0
8	MF	(Honduras) Bryan Acosta	7	1
9	FW	(United States) Jesús Ferreira	1	0
10	MF	(Colombia) Andrés Ricaurte	5	0
11	MF	(Hungary) Szabolcs Schön	5	0
12	DF	(United States) Ryan Hollingshead	3	0
14	DF	(United States) Nkosi Tafari	1	0
15	MF	(United States) Tanner Tessmann	1	0
16	FW	(United States) Ricardo Pepi	1	0
17	MF	(Venezuela) Freddy Vargas	2	0
18	MF	(United States) Brandon Servania	2	0
19	MF	(United States) Paxton Pomykal	3	0
20	GK	(United States) Jimmy Maurer	3	0
21	MF	(United States) Kalil ElMedkhar	1	0
22	FW	(Ghana) Ema Twumasi	7	0
24	DF	(United States) Matt Hedges	6	0
29	FW	(Argentina) Franco Jara	7	0
99	GK	(Brazil) Phelipe	1	0
Total			80	1

=== Goalkeeper stats ===
As of final match played November 7, 2021

No.	Name	Major League Soccer			
No.	Name	MIN	GA	GAA	SV
20	(United States) Jimmy Maurer	2131	37	1.54	77
99	(Brazil) Phelipe	929	19	1.90	37
	TOTALS	3060	56	1.65	114

== Kits ==
Primary	Primary Alt.	Primary Alt. 2	Primary Alt. 3	Primary Alt. 4	Secondary	Secondary Alt.	Secondary Alt.2	Primeblue

Type	Shirt	Shorts	Socks	First appearance / Info
Primary	Red / Blue hoops	Blue	Red / Blue hoops	MLS, April 17, 2021 against Colorado Rapids
Primary Alternate	Red / Blue hoops	White	White / Blue hoops	MLS, April 24, 2021 against San Jose Earthquakes
Primary Alternate 2	Red / Blue hoops	Blue	Blue / Red hoops	MLS, May 8, 2021 against Houston Dynamo FC
Primary Alternate 3	Red / Blue hoops	White	Red / Blue hoops	MLS, May 15, 2021 against Minnesota United FC
Primary Alternate 4	Red / Blue hoops	White	Blue / White hoops	MLS, August 4, 2021 against Seattle Sounders FC
Secondary	Powder Blue	Blue	Blue / Red hoops	MLS, May 1, 2021 against Portland Timbers
Secondary Alternate	Powder Blue	White	White / Blue hoops	MLS, June 27, 2021 against New England Revolution
Secondary Alternate 2	Powder Blue	Blue	White / Blue hoops	MLS, July 17, 2021 against Portland Timbers
Primeblue	Ocean Blue	Ocean Blue	Ocean Blue / Dark Turquoise hoops	MLS, May 29, 2021 against Colorado Rapids

== See also ==
- FC Dallas
- 2021 in American soccer
- 2021 Major League Soccer season
