= Texas Derby =

Soccer rivalry

- Location: Texas
- Teams: FC Dallas; Houston Dynamo FC
- First meeting: May 6, 2006; MLS regular season Houston 4–3 Dallas
- Latest meeting: October 17, 2026; MLS regular season Houston 2–2 Dallas
- Next meeting: April 24, 2027; MLS regular season Houston at Dallas
- Stadiums: Houston Dynamo FC: Shell Energy Stadium (2012–present); FC Dallas: Toyota Stadium (2006–present)

Statistics
- Total meetings: 58
- All-time record: Dallas: 21; Drawn: 21; Houston: 16
- All-time series: Dallas leads 12–9
- Largest victory: Houston 5–0 Dallas; Major League Soccer (March 12, 2016)
- Longest win streak: 7 (Dallas, 2013–2015)

The Texas Derby is a soccer rivalry (derby) between Houston Dynamo FC and FC Dallas, recognizing the best club in the state for the season until 2021 when Austin FC joined MLS. The two squads play a series of games with the series winner taking home El Capitán, a replica 18th century mountain howitzer cannon. Through the 2026 season, FC Dallas leads the series, 12–9.

Houston clinched the 2006 series with a win on August 12, 2006, and the 2007 series with a win on August 19, 2007. FC Dallas claimed the 2008 series on the away goals rule, after having tied with Dynamo in all three games played that season. The away goals rule is no longer used as a tiebreaker.

Both the 2016 and 2017 series were tied, the first since 2008 and the first since the tiebreaker rules were changed. Houston won the 2016 series on goal differential. The tiebreakers couldn't separate the teams in 2017 so Houston retained El Capitán. Dallas won the 2019 series on goal differential and the 2023 series on the final tiebreaker (holders retain) as both matches ended in a draw.

== Tiebreakers ==
Only MLS regular season matches are used to determine the winner of El Capitán, unless the season series is tied. If the series is tied, the tiebreakers are as follows:

1	goal differential in MLS regular season matches between the two teams
2	MLS Cup Playoffs – winner of match/series (if applicable)
3	CONCACAF Champions League – winner of series (if applicable)
4	U.S. Open Cup – winner of match (if applicable)
5	holders retain El Capitán

== Series results ==
=== El Capitán winners ===
Year	Winners	Record
2006	Houston Dynamo	2–1–1
2007	Houston Dynamo	3–0–1
2008	FC Dallas	0–0–3 (Note: Dallas won the 2008 series on the away goals rule (4–2). Two games were played in Houston and one in Dallas.)
2009	Houston Dynamo	2–1
2010	FC Dallas	1–0–1
2011	Houston Dynamo	1–0–1
2012	Houston Dynamo	1–0
2013	FC Dallas	1–0
2014	FC Dallas	1–0
2015	FC Dallas	3–0
2016	Houston Dynamo	1–1–1 (Note: Houston won the 2016 series on the 1st tiebreaker, goal differential (7:4).)
2017	Houston Dynamo	0–0–3 (Note: Houston won the 2017 series on the 5th tiebreaker, holders retain, as all matches ended in a draw.)
2018	FC Dallas	1–0–2
2019	FC Dallas	1–1 (Note: Dallas won the 2019 series on the 1st tiebreaker, goal differential (6:3).)
2020	FC Dallas	2–1–1
2021	Houston Dynamo	1–0–2
2022	FC Dallas	1–0–1
2023	FC Dallas	0–0–2 (Note: Dallas won the 2023 series on the 5th tiebreaker, holders retain, as both matches ended in a draw.)
2024	FC Dallas	1–0–1
2025	Houston Dynamo	1–1–0 (Note: Houston won the 2025 series on the 1st tiebreaker, 3–2 on aggregate.)
2026	FC Dallas	1–0–1

=== All-time record ===
As of March 21, 2026

Competition	Played	Houston Dynamo wins	Houston Dynamo goals	Drawn	FC Dallas wins	FC Dallas goals
MLS regular season	52	14	73	21	17	82
MLS Cup Playoffs	2	1	4	0	1	2
U.S. Open Cup	4	1	5	0	3	7
Total	58	16	82	21	21	91

== Game history ==
Date (M/D/Y)	Competition	Houston Dynamo scorers	Score	FC Dallas scorers	Venue	Attendance	Ref.
5/6/06	MLS	Clark 31', Ching 35', De Rosario 45', 67'	4–3	Ruiz 60', Núñez 61', Moor 76'	Robertson Stadium	21,448	
5/13/06	MLS	Goodson 81 (o.g.)	1–1	Ruiz 19'	Pizza Hut Park	12,756	
8/12/06	MLS	Waibel 37'	1–0		Robertson Stadium	10,964	
8/23/06	U.S. Open Cup	Robinson 13', Moreno 57' Wondolowski 61'	3–0		Carl Lewis Stadium	4,000	
9/2/06	MLS		0–1	Álvarez 86'	Pizza Hut Park	14,316	
6/3/07	MLS	Clark 51', Ngwenya 66'	2–1	Thompson 32'	Robertson Stadium	13,199	
6/30/07	MLS		0–0		Pizza Hut Park	13,887	
8/19/07	MLS	Ching 42'	1–0		Robertson Stadium	19,501	
9/30/07	MLS	De Rosario 45+1', Robinson 62', Holden 84'	3–0		Pizza Hut Park	17,366	
10/27/07	MLS Cup Playoffs		0–1	Goodson 23'	Pizza Hut Park	12,537	
11/2/07	MLS Cup Playoffs	Holden 67', Ching 72', 97', Davis 100'	4–1 (a.e.t.)	Ruiz 14'	Robertson Stadium	30,088	
4/6/08	MLS	Caraccio 22', Ching 56', Cameron 90+2'	3–3	Cooper 35', 45', Álvarez 58'	Robertson Stadium	20,102	
5/28/08	MLS	Ashe 56', De Rosario 90+3'	2–2	Cooper 34', Moor 61"	Pizza Hut Park	8,541	
6/26/08	MLS	Ching 21'	1–1	Cooper 62'	Robertson Stadium	16,933	
5/9/09	MLS	Kamara 58'	1–0		Robertson Stadium	16,932	
6/13/09	MLS	Weaver 12', 63', Mulrooney 37'	3–1	Moor 67'	Pizza Hut Park	8,580	
8/6/09	MLS		0–1	Cunningham 20'	Pizza Hut Park	7,442	
3/27/10	MLS	Chabala 36'	1–1	Harris 38'	Pizza Hut Park	8,018	
5/5/10	MLS		0–1	Ihemelu 78'	Robertson Stadium	13,231	
5/28/11	MLS	Weaver 42', Clark 87'	2–2	Jacobson 27', ihemelu 70'	Robertson Stadium	16,709	
9/24/11	MLS	Cameron 87'	1–0		Pizza Hut Park	10,849	
6/16/12	MLS	Bruin 3', Moffat 76'	2–1	Jackson 59'	BBVA Compass Stadium	22,039	
3/17/13	MLS	Driver 79', Davis 83'	2–3	John 34', Jacobson 36', Cooper 90'	FC Dallas Stadium	15,623	
6/12/13	U.S. Open Cup		0–3	Cooper 37', 59', Loyd 76'	FC Dallas Stadium	4,000	
4/5/14	MLS	Clark 41'	1–4	Michel 31'(pen.), Watson 67', 70', Barnes 68'(o.g.)	BBVA Compass Stadium	22,202	
6/24/14	U.S. Open Cup	Barnes 43' (pen.), Cummings 62'	2–3 (a.e.t.)	Castillo 35', Escobar 60', Akindele 99'	BBVA Compass Stadium	2,083	
5/1/15	MLS	Barnes 32'	1–4	Hollingshead 9', Texiera 21' Díaz 52', Castillo 55'	BBVA Compass Stadium	19,975	
6/26/15	MLS		0–2	Taylor 37' (o.g.), Castillo 42'	Toyota Stadium	15,037	
10/4/15	MLS	Clark 36'	1–4	Díaz 24' (pen.), Texiera 51', 90+3', Acosta 53'	Toyota Stadium	11,000	
3/12/16	MLS	Horst 6', Hedges 13' (o.g.), Clark 23', Wenger 27', Bruin 85'	5–0		BBVA Compass Stadium	21,601	
6/2/16	MLS	Clark 51'	1–1	Hollingshead 23'	Toyota Stadium	13,457	
7/20/16	U.S. Open Cup		0–1	Castillo 90+1'	BBVA Compass Stadium	10,150	
8/27/16	MLS	Alex 19'	1–3	Díaz 59' (pen.), Barrios 60', 79'	BBVA Compass Stadium	18,769	
5/28/17	MLS		0–0		Toyota Stadium	15,055	
6/23/17	MLS	Torres 19'	1–1	Urruti 59'	BBVA Compass Stadium	22,115	
8/23/17	MLS	Sánchez 1', Torres 71', 86'	3–3	Akindele 45', Figueroa 45+2', Urruti 51'	Toyota Stadium	13,339	
7/21/18	MLS	Manotas 8'	1–1	Hedges 1'	BBVA Compass Stadium	19,295	
8/23/18	MLS	Peña 88'	1–1	Barrios 83'	BBVA Compass Stadium	16,544	
9/1/18	MLS	Manotas 53', Elis 72' (pen.)	2–4	Barrios 10', Mosquera 48', 51', Ziegler 58' (pen.)	Toyota Stadium	16,835	
5/4/19	MLS	Manotas 20' (pen.), 58'	2–1	Badji 87'	BBVA Compass Stadium	16,521	
8/25/19	MLS	Rodriguez 80'	1–5	Ziegler 24' (pen.), Ferreira 29', Ondrášek 56', 64', Barrios 90+6'	Toyota Stadium	15,452	
8/21/20	MLS		0–0		BBVA Stadium	0 (Note: no fans due to the COVID-19 pandemic restrictions)	
9/12/20	MLS	Rodríguez 41'	1–2	Ricaurte 28', Jara 61'	Toyota Stadium	222 (Note: limited capacity due to COVID-19 pandemic restrictions)	
10/7/20	MLS	Quintero 20', Cerén 83' (pen.)	2–0		BBVA Stadium	1,582	
10/31/20	MLS		0–3	Jara 19', Picault 27', 90+3'	Toyota Stadium	4,028	
5/8/21	MLS	Picault 34'	1–1	Obrian 42'	Toyota Stadium	8,749	
8/21/21	MLS	Picault 25' (pen.), Vera 72'	2–2	Tafari 54', Pepi 58'	BBVA Stadium	13,548	
9/18/21	MLS	Dorsey 5', Picault 20', Quintero 59' (pen.)	3–2	Obrian 86', 90+4'	BBVA Stadium	12,353	
4/23/22	MLS	Ferreira 33'	1–2	Ntsabeleng 87', Quignón 90+3'	Toyota Stadium	15,792	
7/9/22	MLS	Úlfarsson 69', Hadebe 90+11'	2–2	Hedges 27', Ferreira 90+3'	PNC Stadium	21,284	
5/20/23	MLS	Úlfarsson 85'	1–1	Obrian 53'	Toyota Stadium	19,096	
9/30/23	MLS		0–0		Shell Energy Stadium	18,175	
4/27/24	MLS		0–2	Musa 55', Ibeagha 80'	Toyota Stadium	19,096	
5/18/24	MLS	Bassi 45'+6'	1–1	Musa 69'	Shell Energy Stadium	19,284	
2/22/25	MLS	Bassi 18'	1–2	Musa 55', Julio 76'	Shell Energy Stadium	18,623	
5/17/25	MLS	McGlynn 64', Dorsey 81'	2–0		Toyota Stadium	11,004	
3/21/26	MLS	Guilherme 29', Sviatchenko 31', Ennali 33'	3–4	Farrington 6', 14', Holmes 54' (o.g.), Musa 86'	Toyota Stadium	11,004	
10/17/26	MLS		2–2		Shell Energy Stadium		
4/24/27	MLS				Toyota Stadium		

== Top scorers ==
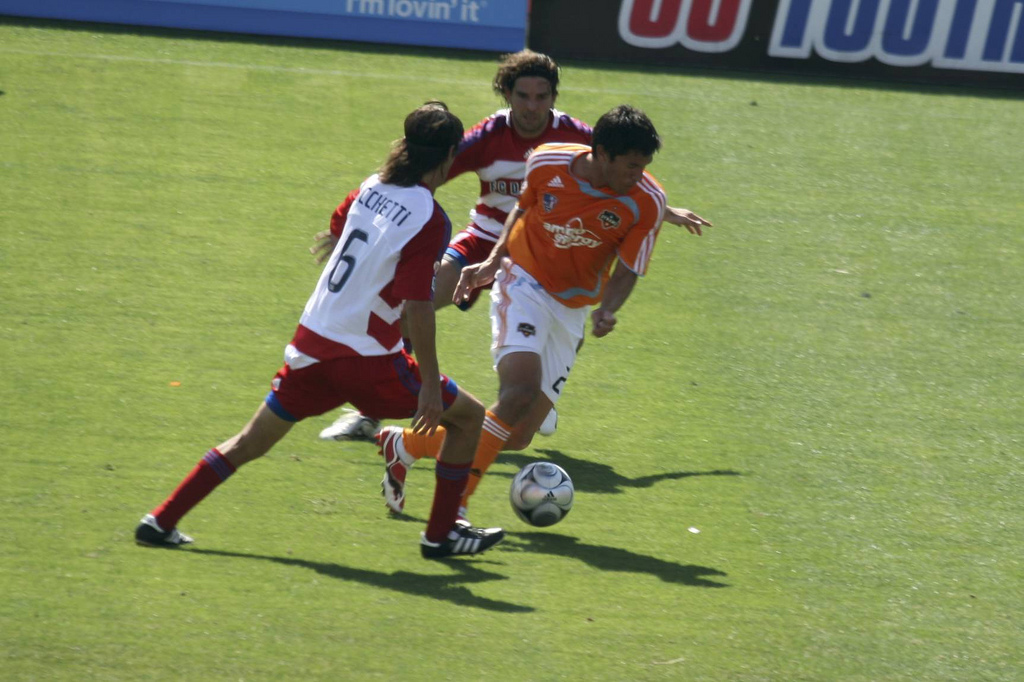
All-time series leading scorer Brian Ching

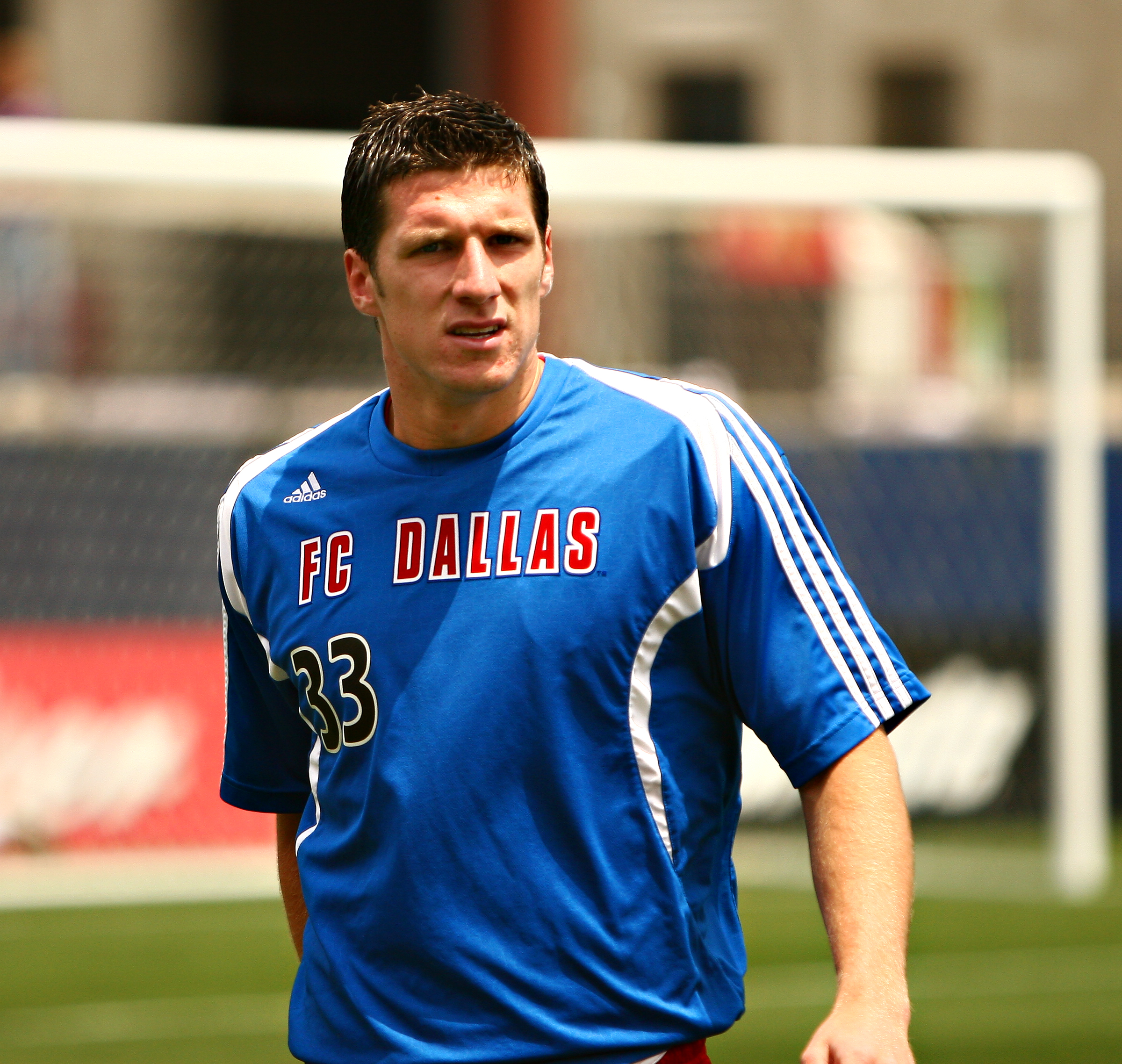
FC Dallas' all-time leading scorer in Texas Derbies, Kenny Cooper

As of March 21, 2026

Bold indicates a player who is still on a FC Dallas or Houston Dynamo roster.

Rank	Player	Team	Goals
1	(United States) Brian Ching	Houston	6
1	(United States) Ricardo Clark	Houston	6
3	(Colombia) Michael Barrios	Dallas	5
3	(United States) Kenny Cooper	Dallas	5
3	(United States) Fafa Picault	Houston	5
6	(Colombia) Fabián Castillo	Dallas	4
6	(Canada) Dwayne De Rosario	Houston	4
6	(Croatia) **Petar Musa**	Dallas	4
6	(Colombia) Mauro Manotas	Houston	4
6	(Colombia) Jáder Obrian	Dallas	4

== Clean sheets ==
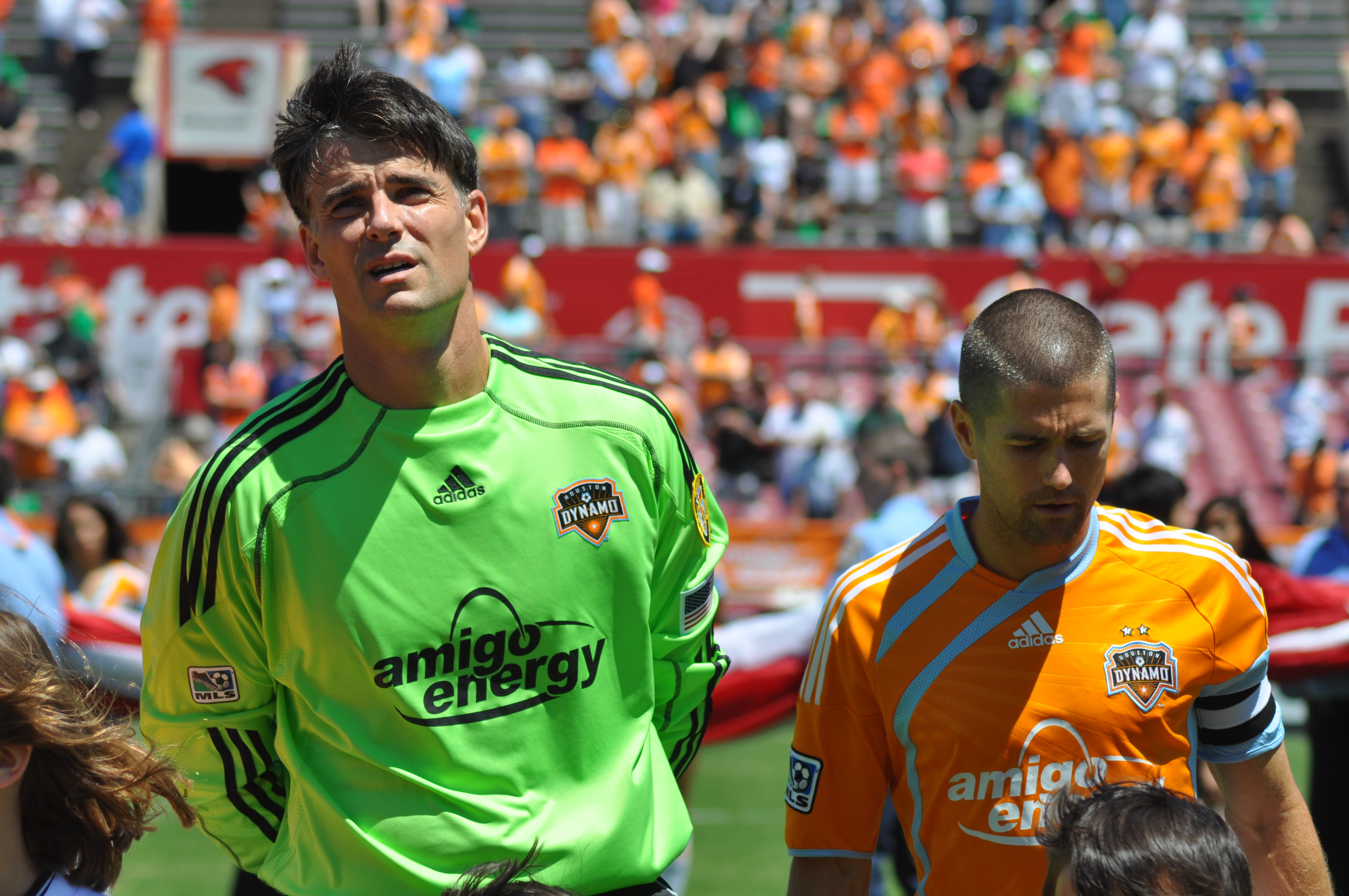
All-time series leader in shutouts, Pat Onstad

As of March 21, 2026

Bold indicates a player who is still on a FC Dallas or Houston Dynamo roster.

Rank	Player	Team	Shutouts
1	(Canada) Pat Onstad	Houston	5
2	(Argentina) Darío Sala	Dallas	4
3	(United States) **Jimmy Maurer**	Dallas	2
3	(Indonesia) Maarten Paes	Dallas	2
3	(United States) Chris Seitz	Dallas	2
6	(England) **Jonathan Bond**	Houston	1
6	(United States) Steve Clark	Houston	1
6	(United States) Tyler Deric	Houston	1
6	(United States) Jesse González	Dallas	1
6	(United States) Tally Hall	Houston	1
6	(United States) Kevin Hartman	Dallas	1
6	(United States) Dan Kennedy	Dallas	1
6	(Croatia) Marko Marić	Houston	1
6	(United States) Zach Wells	Houston	1
6	(United States) Joe Willis	Houston	1

== Players who have played for both clubs ==
As of March 21, 2026

Bold indicates a player who is still on a FC Dallas or Houston Dynamo roster.

Player	Position	Houston years	Dallas years	Texas derby goals
(United States) Eric Alexander	MF	2016–2018	2010–2011, 2019	0
(El Salvador) Arturo Álvarez	MF	2018	2005–2008	2
(El Salvador) Ronald Cerritos	FW	2006	2002–2003	0
(United States) Brad Davis	MF	2006–2015	2003–2004	2
(Honduras) Maynor Figueroa	DF	2019–2021	2016–2018	1
(United States) Sam Junqua	DF	2019–2022	2023–2024	0
(United States) **Jimmy Maurer**	GK	2025–present	2018–2024	0
(Scotland) Adam Moffat	MF	2011–2013	2014	1
(United States) Richard Mulrooney	MF	2007–2010	2005–2006	1
(Ghana) Dominic Oduro	FW	2009–2011	2006–2008	0
(Haiti) Fafà Picault	FW	2021–2022	2020	5
(United States) Chris Seitz	GK	2018	2011–2017	0
(Canada) Adrian Serioux	DF	2006, 2010	2007–2008	0
(United States) Abe Thompson	FW	2009	2005–2008	1
(Argentina) Maximiliano Urruti	FW	2021	2016–2018	2
(Jamaica) Je-Vaughn Watson	MF	2011–2012	2013–2015	2

== Attendances ==
Top 5 most-attended Houston home Texas derbies

- Houston 4–1 (aet) Dallas; **30,088** (November 2, 2007) Robertson Stadium
- Houston 1–4 Dallas; **22,202** (April 5, 2014) BBVA Compass Stadium
- Houston 1–1 Dallas; **22,115** (June 23, 2017) BBVA Compass Stadium
- Houston 2–1 Dallas; **22,039** (June 16, 2012) BBVA Compass Stadium
- Houston 5–0 Dallas; **21,601** (March 12, 2016) BBVA Compass Stadium

Top 5 least-attended Houston home Texas derbies

- Houston 0–0 Dallas; **0** (August 21, 2020) BBVA Stadium (Note: no fans due to the COVID-19 pandemic restrictions)
- Houston 2–0 Dallas; **1,582** (October 7, 2020) BBVA Stadium (Note: limited capacity due to COVID-19 pandemic restrictions)
- Houston 2–3 (aet) Dallas; **2,083** (June 24, 2014) BBVA Compass Stadium (Note: U.S. Open Cup match)
- Houston 3–0 Dallas; **4,000** (August 8, 2006) Carl Lewis Track and Field Stadium
- Houston 0–1 Dallas; **10,150** (July 20, 2016) BBVA Compass Stadium

Top 5 most-attended Dallas home Texas derbies

- Dallas 1–1 Houston; **19,096** (May 20, 2023) Toyota Stadium
- Dallas 2–0 Houston; **19,096** (April 27, 2024) Toyota Stadium
- Dallas 0–3 Houston; **17,366** (September 30, 2007) Pizza Hut Park
- Dallas 4–2 Houston; **16,835** (September 1, 2018) Toyota Stadium
- Dallas 2–1 Houston; **15,792** (April 23, 2022) Toyota Stadium

Top 5 least-attended Dallas home Texas derbies

- Dallas 2–1 Houston; **222** (September 12, 2020) Toyota Stadium
- Dallas 3–0 Houston; **4,000** (June 12, 2013) FC Dallas Stadium
- Dallas 3–0 Houston; **4,028** (October 31, 2020) Toyota Stadium
- Dallas 1–0 Houston; **7,442** (August 6, 2009) Pizza Hut Park
- Dallas 1–1 Houston; **8,018** (March 27, 2010) Pizza Hut Park

== Honors ==
As of May 17, 2025

FC Dallas	Title	Houston Dynamo
**International**
–	FIFA Club World Cup	–
0	CONCACAF Champions League	0
0	Leagues Cup	0
–	Campeones Cup	–
**Domestic**
0	MLS Cup	2
1	MLS Supporters' Shield	0
2	U.S. Open Cup	2
1	MLS Conference Championships (MLS Cup Playoffs)	4
3	MLS Conference Championships (regular season)	1
**Rivalries**
12	Texas Derby (Dallas/Houston)	9
3	Copa Tejas (Dallas/Houston/Austin)	1
**Preseason**
1	La Copita (Dallas/Houston/Austin/San Antonio)	0
1	Desert Showcase	1
1	Walt Disney World Pro Soccer Classic (defunct)	0
–	Carolina Challenge Cup (defunct)	3

== See also ==
- Lone Star Series (MLB)
- Governor's Cup (Texas) (NFL)
- Mavericks–Rockets rivalry (NBA)
- Copa Tejas
