= 2020 FC Dallas season =

FC Dallas
2020 season
- Owner: Clark and Dan Hunt
- Head coach: Luchi Gonzalez
- Stadium: Toyota Stadium
- MLS: Conference: 6th Overall: 11th
- MLS Cup playoffs: Conference semifinals
- U.S. Open Cup: Canceled
- MLS is Back Tournament: Withdrew
- Top goalscorer: League: Franco Jara (7); All: Franca Jara (7)
- Highest home attendance: 16,219 (February 29 vs. Philadelphia Union)
- Lowest home attendance: 222 (August 16 vs. Nashville SC)
- Average home league attendance: 5,527
- Biggest win: 4–1 (September 16 vs. Colorado Rapids); 3–0 (October 31 vs. Houston Dynamo)
- Biggest defeat: 0–3 (October 20 vs. Nashville SC); 0–3 (November 8 vs. Minnesota United FC)
| Primary colors | Secondary colors |

The 2020 FC Dallas season was the club's 25th season in Major League Soccer, the top tier of American soccer. FC Dallas was also to participate in the U.S. Open Cup before its cancelation due to the COVID-19 pandemic in North America.

On March 12, the season entered a month-long suspension due to COVID-19, following the cancellation of several matches. On March 19, the suspension was extended until May 10, and on April 17, the suspension was extended further to June 8. On May 1, the league announced that players will be allowed to resume individual outdoor training at MLS facilities on May 6. On June 10, MLS announced that a bracket format dubbed the "MLS is Back Tournament" would begin July 8 at ESPN Wide World of Sports Complex in Walt Disney World, and end with the final on August 11.

On July 6, MLS announced FC Dallas would not be participating in the MLS is Back Tournament due to a high number of players and technical staff testing positive for COVID-19.

On August 8, MLS unveiled the framework of a revised schedule for the remainder of the 2020 season, with the League's 25th season continuing in the home markets of the 26 clubs beginning August 12 and continuing till September 20 with plans to announce the balance of the regular season schedule by early September. Attendance at matches was determined by MLS and club leadership in accordance with applicable state and local guidelines.

On September 11, MLS announced the regular season match schedule and national broadcast details that cover matches through the end of September along with the qualification and competition format for the 2020 MLS Cup Playoffs. Additional regular season matches were announced at a later date pending further developments regarding travel protocols.

On September 22, FC Dallas announced nine additional matches that Major League Soccer released for the remainder of its 2020 regular season schedule. FC Dallas played one additional match against Nashville SC to complete the 23-game regular season schedule. That match was announced at a later date.

On October 8, Major League Soccer announced the third and final makeup match from the MLS is Back Tournament between FC Dallas and Nashville SC that was played Wednesday, November 4 at 7:30 p.m. at Nissan Stadium in Nashville. Both Dallas and Nashville were forced to withdraw from the MLS is Back Tournament after players and staff from both teams contracted COVID-19.

On October 31, Major League Soccer confirmed that qualification for the Audi MLS Cup Playoffs would be determined by points per game. The league had indicated it would use points per game to determine playoff qualifiers in the case clubs played an uneven number of matches. As a result, the Minnesota United FC game originally scheduled on October 14 was canceled.

== Transfers ==
=== In ===
| No. | Pos. | Nat. | Name | Age | Moving from | Type | Transfer window | Ends | Transfer fee | Source |
|---|---|---|---|---|---|---|---|---|---|---|
| 9 | MF | (United States) | Fafà Picault | 28 | Philadelphia Union (United States) | Transfer | Pre-season | Undisclosed | Allocation money | |
| 5 | MF | (Brazil) | Thiago Santos | 30 | Palmeiras (Brazil) | Transfer | Pre-season | Undisclosed | Allocation money | |
| 27 | DF | (United States) | Eddie Munjoma | 21 | FC Dallas Academy (United States) | Transfer | Pre-season | Undisclosed | HGP contract | |
| 29 | FW | (Argentina) | Franco Jara | 31 | C.F. Pachuca (Mexico) | Transfer | Mid-season | Undisclosed | Undisclosed | |
| 28 | MF | (United States) | Nkosi Burgess | 22 | Seattle University (United States) | Signed Draft Pick | Pre-season | Undisclosed | Undisclosed | |
| 15 | MF | (United States) | Tanner Tessmann | 18 | FC Dallas Academy (United States) | Transfer | Pre-season | Undisclosed | HGP contract | |
| 40 | GK | (United States) | Carlos Avilez | 21 | FC Dallas Academy (United States) | Transfer | Mid-season | Undisclosed | HGP contract | |
| 10 | MF | (Colombia) | Andrés Ricaurte | 28 | Independiente Medellín (Colombia) | Loan | Mid-season | Undisclosed | Allocation money | |
| 99 | GK | (Brazil) | Phelipe Megiolaro | 21 | Grêmio (Brazil) | Loan | Mid-season | Undisclosed | Undisclosed | |
| 46 | DF | (United States) | Justin Che | 16 | FC Dallas Academy (United States) | Transfer | Mid-season | Undisclosed | HGP contract | |

==== Draft picks ====
| Round | Selection | Pos. | Name | College | Signed | Source |
|---|---|---|---|---|---|---|
| 1 | 14 | DF | (United States) Nkosi Burgess | Seattle | Signed | |
| 1 | 17 | FW | (United States) Cal Jennings | UCF | Signed with Memphis 901 FC | |
| 2 | 40 | MF | (Spain) Manuel Ferriol | James Madison | Signed with FC Tucson | |
| 3 | 66 | MF | (United States) Derek Waldeck | Stanford | Signed with North Texas SC | |
| 4 | 79 | FW | (Norway) Anders Engebretsen | Saint Mary's College | Signed with North Texas SC | |
| 4 | 92 | MF | (United States) Aidan Megally | Loyola | Unsigned | |

=== Out ===
| No. | Pos. | Nat. | Name | Age | Moving to | Type | Transfer window | Transfer fee | Source |
|---|---|---|---|---|---|---|---|---|---|
| 7 | FW | (Ghana) | Edwin Gyasi | 28 | PFC CSKA Sofia (Bulgaria) | End of Loan | Pre-season | Free | |
| 6 | MF | (United States) | Eric Alexander | 31 | none | Out of Contract | Pre-season | Free | |
| 5 | DF | (Guatemala) | Moisés Hernández | 27 | Antigua GFC (Guatemala) | Option Declined | Pre-season | Free | |
| 9 | FW | (Paraguay) | Cristian Colmán | 25 | Barcelona S.C. (Ecuador) | Option Declined | Pre-season | Free | |
| 16 | FW | (Senegal) | Dominique Badji | 27 | Nashville SC (United States) | Trade | Pre-season | Allocation money | |
| 15 | MF | (United States) | Jacori Hayes | 24 | Minnesota United FC (United States) | Trade | Pre-season | 2021 third-round pick | |
| 1 | GK | (United States) | Jesse González | 25 | none | Contract Terminated | Mid-season | Free | |
| 2 | DF | (United States) | Reggie Cannon | 22 | Boavista (Portugal) | Transfer | Mid-season | Undisclosed | |
| 13 | FW | (Czech Republic) | Zdeněk Ondrášek | 31 | FC Viktoria Plzeň (Czech Republic) | Transfer | Mid-season | Undisclosed | |

== Club ==
=== Roster ===
As of October 7, 2020. Note: Flags indicate national team as defined under FIFA eligibility rules; some limited exceptions apply. Players may hold more than one non-FIFA nationality.

| No. | Pos. | Nation | Player |
|---|---|---|---|
| 3 | DF | SUI | Reto Ziegler |
| 4 | DF | BRA | Bressan |
| 5 | MF | BRA | Thiago Santos |
| 7 | FW | USA | Jesús Ferreira (HGP) |
| 8 | MF | HON | Bryan Acosta (DP) |
| 9 | MF | USA | Fafà Picault |
| 10 | MF | COL | Andrés Ricaurte (on loan from Independiente Medellín) |
| 11 | MF | COL | Santiago Mosquera (DP) |
| 12 | MF | USA | Ryan Hollingshead |
| 14 | DF | USA | Bryan Reynolds (HGP) |
| 15 | MF | USA | Tanner Tessmann (HGP) |
| 16 | FW | USA | Ricardo Pepi (HGP) |
| 17 | FW | GHA | Francis Atuahene |
| 18 | MF | USA | Brandon Servania (HGP) |
| 19 | MF | USA | Paxton Pomykal (HGP) |
| 20 | GK | USA | Jimmy Maurer |

| No. | Pos. | Nation | Player |
|---|---|---|---|
| 21 | MF | COL | Michael Barrios |
| 22 | FW | GHA | Ema Twumasi |
| 23 | MF | USA | Thomas Roberts (HGP) |
| 24 | DF | USA | Matt Hedges |
| 25 | DF | CAN | Callum Montgomery |
| 26 | DF | USA | John Nelson (GA) |
| 27 | DF | USA | Eddie Munjoma (HGP) |
| 28 | DF | USA | Nkosi Burgess |
| 29 | FW | ARG | Franco Jara (DP) |
| 30 | GK | USA | Kyle Zobeck |
| 31 | FW | USA | Dante Sealy (HGP) |
| 33 | MF | USA | Edwin Cerrillo (HGP) |
| 40 | GK | USA | Carlos Avilez (HGP) |
| 46 | DF | USA | Justin Che (HGP) |
| 99 | GK | BRA | Phelipe Megiolaro (on loan from Grêmio) |

=== Out on loan ===
Note: Flags indicate national team as defined under FIFA eligibility rules; some limited exceptions apply. Players may hold more than one non-FIFA nationality.

| No. | Pos. | Nation | Player |
|---|---|---|---|
| 10 | MF | CHI | Pablo Aránguiz (DP) (on loan to Club Universidad de Chile) |

== Competitions ==
=== Preseason ===
Kickoff times are in CST (UTC-06) unless shown otherwise

| January 29, 2020 1 | FC Dallas | 3–2 | OKC Energy FC | Frisco, Texas |
| 4:00 p.m. CST (UTC-06) | Mosquera (1st half); Ondrášek (1st half) (2nd half) | Report; Report | Iida (2nd half); Chavez (2nd half) | Stadium: AdvoCare Field 4 at Toyota Soccer Center |

| January 29, 2020 2 | FC Dallas | 3–0 | NTX Rayados | Frisco, Texas |
| 6:00 p.m. CST (UTC-06) | Rodríguez; Jennings, | Report; Report | | Stadium: AdvoCare Field 4 at Toyota Soccer Center |

| February 1, 2020 3 | Vancouver Whitecaps FC | 4–1 | FC Dallas | San Diego, California |
| 1:00 p.m. CST (UTC-06) | Raposo 21'; Adnan 35'; Teibert 39'; Reyna 80' | Report; Report | Ondrasek 30' | Stadium: Triton Soccer Stadium |
Note: Played in three 30-minute periods.

| February 2, 2020 4 | San Diego Loyal SC | 1–0 | FC Dallas | Chula Vista, California |
| 2:00 p.m. CST (UTC-06) | Atuahene | Report; Report | | Stadium: Chula Vista Training Center |

| February 6, 2020 5 | Los Angeles FC | 2–2 | FC Dallas | Los Angeles, California |
| 3:00 p.m. CST (UTC-06) | Rodríguez 30' (o.g.) | Report | Ferreira 45'; Pepi | Stadium: Banc of California Stadium |
Note: Played in three 30-minute periods.

| February 9, 2020 6 | FC Dallas | 1–0 | Austin Bold FC | Frisco, Texas |
| 10:00 a.m. CST (UTC-06) | Ondrášek 4' | Report; Report | | Stadium: Toyota Stadium |
Note: Played in three 30-minute periods.

| February 12, 2020 7 | San Antonio FC | 2–3 | FC Dallas | San Antonio, Texas |
| 7:30 p.m. CST (UTC-06) | Maloney 66' (pen.); Gallegos 72' | Report; Report | Pepi 84'; Barrios 88'; Ziegler 90' | Stadium: Toyota Field |

| February 19, 2020 8 | Philadelphia Union | 2–3 | FC Dallas | Clearwater, Florida |
| 11:00 a.m. CST (UTC-06) | Philadelphia Union, | Report | Picault 16'; Ondrášek, | Stadium: Joe DiMaggio Sports Complex |

| February 22, 2020 9 | Inter Miami CF | 0–2 | FC Dallas | St. Petersburg, Florida |
| 9:00 a.m. CST (UTC-06) | | | | Stadium: Al Lang Stadium |

=== MLS ===
==== Western Conference standings ====
Western Conference

| Pos | Team | Pld | W | L | T | GF | GA | GD | Pts | PPG | Qualification |
|---|---|---|---|---|---|---|---|---|---|---|---|
| 4 | Minnesota United FC | 21 | 9 | 5 | 7 | 36 | 26 | +10 | 34 | 1.62 | Qualification for the first round |
| 5 | Colorado Rapids | 18 | 8 | 6 | 4 | 32 | 28 | +4 | 28 | 1.56 | Qualification for the first round |
| 6 | FC Dallas | 22 | 9 | 6 | 7 | 28 | 24 | +4 | 34 | 1.55 | Qualification for the first round |
| 7 | Los Angeles FC | 22 | 9 | 8 | 5 | 47 | 39 | +8 | 32 | 1.45 | Qualification for the first round |
| 8 | San Jose Earthquakes | 23 | 8 | 9 | 6 | 35 | 51 | −16 | 30 | 1.30 | Qualification for the first round |

Source: MLS
Rules for classification: 1) points per game; 2) total wins per match played; 3) total goal differential per match played; 4) total goals scored per match played; 5) fewest disciplinary points per match played; 6) away goal differential per away match played; 7) away goals scored per away match played; 8) home goal differential per home match played; 9) home goals scored per home match played; 10) coin toss or drawing of lots.

==== Overall standings ====
2020 MLS overall standings
| Pos | Team | Pld | W | L | T | GF | GA | GD | Pts | PPG |
|---|---|---|---|---|---|---|---|---|---|---|
| 9 | Minnesota United FC | 21 | 9 | 5 | 7 | 36 | 26 | +10 | 34 | 1.62 |
| 10 | Colorado Rapids | 18 | 8 | 6 | 4 | 32 | 28 | +4 | 28 | 1.56 |
| 11 | FC Dallas | 22 | 9 | 6 | 7 | 28 | 24 | +4 | 34 | 1.55 |
| 12 | Los Angeles FC | 22 | 9 | 8 | 5 | 47 | 39 | +8 | 32 | 1.45 |
| 13 | New York Red Bulls | 23 | 9 | 9 | 5 | 29 | 31 | −2 | 32 | 1.39 |

Source: MLS
Rules for classification: 1) points per game; 2) total wins per match played; 3) total goal differential per match played; 4) total goals scored per match played; 5) fewest disciplinary points per match played; 6) away goal differential per away match played; 7) away goals scored per away match played; 8) home goal differential per home match played; 9) home goals scored per home match played; 10) coin toss or drawing of lots.

==== Results summary ====
| Overall | | | | | | | | Home | | | | | | Away | | | | | |
| Pld | W | D | L | GF | GA | GD | Pts | W | D | L | GF | GA | GD | W | D | L | GF | GA | GD |
|---|---|---|---|---|---|---|---|---|---|---|---|---|---|---|---|---|---|---|---|
| 22 | 9 | 7 | 6 | 28 | 24 | +4 | 34 | 7 | 4 | 1 | 21 | 9 | +12 | 2 | 3 | 5 | 7 | 15 | −8 |

Last updated: November 8, 2020.
Source: Regular Season

==== Results by round ====
| Round | 1 | 2 | 3 | 4 | 5 | 6 | 7 | 8 | 9 | 10 | 11 | 12 | 13 | 14 | 15 | 16 | 17 | 18 | 19 | 20 | 21 | 22 | 23 |
|---|---|---|---|---|---|---|---|---|---|---|---|---|---|---|---|---|---|---|---|---|---|---|---|
| Stadium | H | H | H | H | A | H | A | A | H | H | A | A | H | H | A | H | H | A | A | H | H | A | A |
| Result | W | D | L | D | D | W | D | L | W | W | W | L | D | D | L | C | W | L | D | W | W | W | L |

Updated to match(es) played on November 8, 2020. Source: Regular Season
A = Away; H = Home; W = Win; D = Draw; L = Loss; C = Cancelled

==== Regular season ====
Kickoff times are in CDT (UTC-05) unless shown otherwise

| February 29, 2020 1 | FC Dallas | 2–0 | Philadelphia Union | Frisco, Texas |
| 5:00 p.m. CST (UTC-06) | Ondrášek 61' (yellow card) 86'; Pomykal 90+1' | Report | Real (yellow card) 26'; Glesnes (yellow card) 59'; Creavalle (yellow card) 67'; Santos (yellow card) 84' | Stadium: Toyota Stadium; Attendance: 16,219; Referee: Robert Sibiga |

| March 7, 2020 2 | FC Dallas | 2–2 | Montreal Impact | Frisco, Texas |
| 2:00 p.m. CST (UTC-06) | Cannon (yellow card) 81'; Ondrášek 83'; Ziegler (yellow card) 85'; Pepi 90+6' | Report | Urruti 59', 68' | Stadium: Toyota Stadium; Attendance: 15,865; Referee: Victor Rivas |

| August 12, 2020 3 | FC Dallas | 0–1 | Nashville SC | Frisco, Texas |
| 7:30 p.m. CDT (UTC-05) | Pomykal (yellow card) 62' | Report | Beckeles (yellow card) 28'; Lovitz (yellow card) 36'; Romney (yellow card) 57'; Leal (yellow card) 64'; Accam 86' | Stadium: Toyota Stadium; Attendance: 2,912; Referee: Armando Villarreal |

| August 16, 2020 4 | FC Dallas | 0–0 | Nashville SC | Frisco, Texas |
| 7:30 p.m. CDT (UTC-05) | Jara (yellow card) 40' | Report | McCarty (yellow card) 69' | Stadium: Toyota Stadium; Attendance: 222; Referee: Rosendo Mendoza |

| August 21, 2020 5 Texas Derby | Houston Dynamo | 0–0 | FC Dallas | Houston, Texas |
| 7:00 p.m. CDT (UTC-05) | Rodríguez (yellow card) 45+1'; Figueroa (yellow card) 82' | Report | Ferreira (yellow card) 42'; Santos (yellow card) 85' | Stadium: BBVA Compass Stadium; Referee: Alex Chilowicz |

| August 29, 2020 6 | FC Dallas | 3–1 | Minnesota United FC | Frisco, Texas |
| 7:30 p.m. CDT (UTC-05) | Picault 11'; Ferreira 12' (yellow card) 48'; Ziegler 90+6' (pen.) | Report | Gasper (yellow card) 50'; Dotson 55'; Métanire (yellow card) 57'; Boxall (yellow card) 81' | Stadium: Toyota Stadium; Attendance: 3,212; Referee: Joseph Dickerson |

| September 2, 2020 7 | Sporting Kansas City | 1–1 | FC Dallas | Kansas City, Kansas |
| 7:30 p.m. CDT (UTC-05) | Shelton 45+3' | Report | Jara 9'; Servania (yellow card) 31'; Barrios (yellow card) 54'; Santos (yellow card) 84' | Stadium: Children's Mercy Park; Referee: Ramy Touchan |

| September 9, 2020 8 | Minnesota United FC | 3–2 | FC Dallas | Saint Paul, Minnesota |
| 7:00 p.m. CDT (UTC-05) | Toye 11'; Molino 28', 70' (pen.); Gasper (yellow card) 47'; Boxall (yellow card) 56'; Aja (yellow card) 80'; Métanire (red card) 82' | Report | Pepi 42'; Mosquera 77' | Stadium: Allianz Field; Referee: Alex Chilowicz |

| September 12, 2020 9 Texas Derby | FC Dallas | 2–1 | Houston Dynamo | Frisco, Texas |
| 7:30 p.m. CDT (UTC-05) | Ricaurte 28'; Santos (yellow card) 33'; Jara 61'; Barrios (yellow card) 90+4' | Report | Cerén (yellow card) 28'; Rodríguez 48' (yellow card) 87'; Lassiter (yellow card) 49'; García (yellow card) 89'; Quintero (yellow card) 90+5' | Stadium: Toyota Stadium; Referee: Joseph Dickerson |
Note: Game was originally scheduled for September 14.

| September 16, 2020 10 | FC Dallas | 4–1 | Colorado Rapids | Frisco, Texas |
| 7:30 p.m. CDT (UTC-05) | Mosquera 41', 57', 78'; Santos (yellow card) 44'; Jara 49' | Report | Shinyashiki 63' | Stadium: Toyota Stadium; Referee: Ismail Elfath |
Note: Game was originally scheduled for August 26.

| September 19, 2020 11 | Sporting Kansas City | 2–3 | FC Dallas | Kansas City, Kansas |
| 2:30 p.m. CDT (UTC-05) | Busio (yellow card) 11'; Russell 53', 83' (yellow card) 80' | Report | Jara 42', 48' (yellow card) 73'; Barrios (yellow card) 75'; Acosta (yellow card) 75' (yellow-red card) 90'; Bressan (yellow card) 82'; Hollingshead 86'; Santos (yellow card) 90+4' | Stadium: Children's Mercy Park; Referee: Alex Chilowicz |

| September 23, 2020 12 | Atlanta United FC | 1–0 | FC Dallas | Atlanta, Georgia |
| 6:00 p.m. CDT (UTC-05) | Larentowicz 55' (pen.) | Report | Bressan (yellow card) 47' | Stadium: Mercedes-Benz Stadium; Referee: Timothy Ford |

| September 27, 2020 13 | FC Dallas | 0–0 | Orlando City SC | Frisco, Texas |
| 7:30 p.m. CDT (UTC-05) | Ricaurte (yellow card) 45+3'; Jara (yellow card) 57'; Santos (yellow card) 87' | Report | Méndez (yellow card) 64' (yellow-red card) 69' | Stadium: Toyota Stadium; Attendance: 3,113; Referee: Ramy Touchan |

| October 3, 2020 14 | FC Dallas | 2–2 | Columbus Crew SC | Frisco, Texas |
| 7:30 p.m. CDT (UTC-05) | Barrios 38'; Ziegler 53' (pen.); Acosta (yellow card) 78' | Report | Afful (yellow card) 23'; Mokhtar 47'; Room (yellow card) 52'; Santos 62'; Díaz (yellow card) 84' | Stadium: Toyota Stadium; Attendance: 3,572; Referee: Ted Unkel |

| October 7, 2020 15 Texas Derby | Houston Dynamo | 2–0 | FC Dallas | Houston, Texas |
| 7:00 p.m. CDT (UTC-05) | Fuenmayor (yellow card) 8'; Cerén (yellow card) 16' (goal) 83' (pen.); Quintero 20'; Manotas (red card) 45+2' | Report | Ziegler (yellow card) 59'; Reynolds (yellow card) 81'; Bressan (yellow card) 90+1'; Barrios (yellow card) 90+8' | Stadium: BBVA Compass Stadium; Attendance: 1,582; Referee: Ismail Elfath |

| October 11, 2020 | FC Dallas | Canceled | Minnesota United FC | Frisco, Texas |
| 7:30 p.m. CDT (UTC-05) | | | | Stadium: Toyota Stadium |
Note: Postponed due to COVID-19 concerns. On October 29, MLS announced that it will not be rescheduled due to the commit of ending the season on November 8

| October 14, 2020 16 | FC Dallas | 1–0 | Sporting Kansas City | Frisco, Texas |
| 7:30 p.m. CDT (UTC-05) | Hollingshead 43'; Barrios (yellow card) 45'; Ziegler (yellow card) 45+2' | Report | Dia (yellow card) 42' | Stadium: Toyota Stadium; Attendance: 2,898; Referee: Armando Villarreal |

| October 20, 2020 17 | Nashville SC | 3–0 | FC Dallas | Nashville, Tennessee |
| 7:30 p.m. CDT (UTC-05) | Leal 19'; Godoy (yellow card) 54'; Cádiz 73'; Ríos 88' | Report | Ferreira (yellow card) 64'; Bressan (yellow card) 70' | Stadium: Nissan Stadium; Attendance: 3,502; Referee: Silviu Petrescu |

| October 24, 2020 18 | Real Salt Lake | 0–0 | FC Dallas | Sandy, Utah |
| 8:30 p.m. CDT (UTC-05) | Ramírez (yellow card) 90+2' | Report | Jara (yellow card) 75' | Stadium: Rio Tinto Stadium; Attendance: 4,078; Referee: Alex Chilowicz |

| October 28, 2020 19 | FC Dallas | 2–1 | Inter Miami CF | Frisco, Texas |
| 7:30 p.m. CDT (UTC-05) | Jara 60' (pen.); Hollingshead 82' (yellow card) 83' | Report | Pizarro 33' (yellow card) 48'; Sweat (yellow card) 45'; González Pírez (yellow card) 54'; Reyes (yellow card) 90+1' | Stadium: Toyota Stadium; Attendance: 3,233; Referee: Victor Rivas |

| October 31, 2020 20 Texas Derby | FC Dallas | 3–0 | Houston Dynamo | Frisco, Texas |
| 2:30 p.m. CDT (UTC-05) | Jara 19'; Picault 27', 90+3' (yellow card) 90+4'; Santos (yellow card) 69' | Report | Bizama (yellow card) 45+2'; Zahibo (yellow card) 55' | Stadium: Toyota Stadium; Attendance: 4,028; Referee: Jair Marrufo |

| November 4, 2020 21 | Nashville SC | 0–1 | FC Dallas | Nashville, Tennessee |
| 7:30 p.m. CST (UTC-06) | | Report | Hollingshead 19', (yellow card) 90+2' | Stadium: Nissan Stadium; Attendance: 3,789; Referee: Marcos de Oliveira |

| November 8, 2020 22 | Minnesota United FC | 3–0 | FC Dallas | Saint Paul, Minnesota |
| 5:30 p.m. CST (UTC-06) | Molino 17', 79'; Métanire (yellow card) 29'; Reynoso 47'; Hairston (yellow card) 51'; Musa (yellow card) 87' | Report | Hollingshead (yellow card) 13'; Santos (yellow card) 30'; Reynolds (yellow card) 45+1' | Stadium: Allianz Field; Referee: Robert Sibiga |

==== MLS is Back Tournament ====
| July 9, 2020 1 | FC Dallas | Canceled | Vancouver Whitecaps FC | Orlando, Florida |
| | | | | Stadium: ESPN Wide World of Sports Complex |

| July 15, 2020 2 | Seattle Sounders FC | Canceled | FC Dallas | Orlando, Florida |
| 8:00 p.m. CDT (UTC-05) | | | | Stadium: ESPN Wide World of Sports Complex |

| July 20, 2020 3 | FC Dallas | Canceled | San Jose Earthquakes | Orlando, Florida |
| 7:00 p.m. CDT (UTC-05) | | | | Stadium: ESPN Wide World of Sports Complex |

=== MLS Cup Playoffs ===
| November 22, 2020 First round | Portland Timbers | 1–1 (a.e.t.) (7–8 p) | FC Dallas | Portland, Oregon |
| 9:00 p.m. CST (UTC-06) | Villafaña 82' | Report | Picault (yellow card) 36'; Ricaurte (yellow card) 75'; Pepi 90+3'; Twumasi (yellow card) 120+1' | Stadium: Providence Park; Attendance: 0 Referee: Armando Villarreal |
| | Penalties |
| | Valeri (penalty scored); Farfan (penalty scored); Župarić (penalty scored); Ebobisse (penalty scored); Bodily (penalty scored); D. Chará (penalty scored); Loría (penalty scored); Villafaña (penalty missed) | | (penalty scored) Ziegler; (penalty scored) Jara; (penalty scored) Bressan; (penalty scored) Pepi; (penalty scored) Hollingshead; (penalty scored) Hedges; (penalty scored) Tessmann; (penalty scored) Twumasi |

| December 1, 2020 Conf. Semifinals | Seattle Sounders FC | 1–0 | FC Dallas | Seattle, Washington |
| 8:30 p.m. CST (UTC-06) | O'Neill 49'; João Paulo (yellow card) 69' | Report | Bressan (yellow card) 58'; Santos (yellow card) 74' | Stadium: Lumen Field; Attendance: 0 Referee: Robert Sibiga |

=== U.S. Open Cup ===
The 2020 Lamar Hunt U.S. Open Cup was cancelled due to the COVID-19 pandemic.

== Statistics ==
=== Appearances ===
Numbers outside parentheses denote appearances as starter.
Numbers in parentheses denote appearances as substitute.
Players with no appearances are not included in the list.

As of final match played December 1, 2020

| No. | Pos. | Nat. | Name | MLS |
| No. | Pos. | Nat. | Name | Apps |
|---|---|---|---|---|
| 3 | DF | SWI | Reto Ziegler | 17(3) |
| 4 | DF | BRA | Bressan | 13(7) |
| 5 | MF | BRA | Thiago Santos | 21(1) |
| 7 | FW | USA | Jesús Ferreira | 14(7) |
| 8 | MF | HON | Bryan Acosta | 10(1) |
| 9 | MF | USA | Fafà Picault | 13(7) |
| 10 | MF | COL | Andrés Ricaurte | 15(1) |
| 11 | FW | COL | Santiago Mosquera | 5(8) |
| 12 | DF | USA | Ryan Hollingshead | 21(1) |
| 14 | DF | USA | Bryan Reynolds | 16(3) |
| 15 | MF | USA | Tanner Tessmann | 10(11) |
| 16 | FW | USA | Ricardo Pepi | 4(15) |
| 18 | MF | USA | Brandon Servania | 4(8) |
| 19 | MF | USA | Paxton Pomykal | 1(4) |
| 20 | GK | USA | Jimmy Maurer | 18 |
| 21 | MF | COL | Michael Barrios | 19(4) |
| 22 | FW | GHA | Ema Twumasi | (5) |
| 24 | DF | USA | Matt Hedges | 20(1) |
| 26 | DF | USA | John Nelson | 10(3) |
| 29 | FW | ARG | Franco Jara | 18(3) |
| 30 | GK | USA | Kyle Zobeck | 3(1) |
| 31 | FW | USA | Dante Sealy | (5) |
| 33 | MF | USA | Edwin Cerrillo | (2) |
| 99 | GK | BRA | Phelipe Megiolaro | 1 |
Player(s) exiting club mid-season that made appearance
| 1 | GK | USA | Jesse González | 2 |
| 2 | DF | USA | Reggie Cannon | 5 |
| 13 | FW | CZE | Zdeněk Ondrášek | 4(1) |

=== Goals and assists ===
As of final match played December 1, 2020
Player name(s) in italics transferred out mid-season.

| No. | Pos. | Name | MLS | |
| No. | Pos. | Name | Goals | Assists |
|---|---|---|---|---|
| 2 | DF | (United States) Reggie Cannon | 0 | 1 |
| 3 | DF | (Switzerland) Reto Ziegler | 2 | 1 |
| 4 | DF | (Brazil) Bressan | 0 | 1 |
| 5 | MF | (Brazil) Thiago Santos | 0 | 1 |
| 7 | FW | (United States) Jesús Ferreira | 1 | 1 |
| 8 | MF | (Honduras) Bryan Acosta | 0 | 2 |
| 9 | MF | (United States) Fafà Picault | 3 | 2 |
| 10 | MF | (Colombia) Andrés Ricaurte | 1 | 2 |
| 11 | MF | (Colombia) Santiago Mosquera | 4 | 0 |
| 12 | DF | (United States) Ryan Hollingshead | 4 | 1 |
| 13 | FW | (Czech Republic) Zdeněk Ondrášek | 2 | 1 |
| 14 | DF | (United States) Bryan Reynolds | 0 | 3 |
| 15 | MF | (United States) Tanner Tessmann | 0 | 1 |
| 16 | FW | (United States) Ricardo Pepi | 3 | 1 |
| 19 | MF | (United States) Paxton Pomykal | 1 | 0 |
| 21 | MF | (Colombia) Michael Barrios | 1 | 5 |
| 24 | DF | (United States) Matt Hedges | 0 | 1 |
| 26 | DF | (United States) John Nelson | 0 | 1 |
| 29 | FW | (Argentina) Franco Jara | 7 | 0 |
| Total | | | 29 | 25 |

=== Disciplinary record ===
As of final match played December 1, 2020
Player name(s) in italics transferred out mid-season.

| No. | Pos. | Name | MLS | |
| No. | Pos. | Name | Yellow card | Red card |
|---|---|---|---|---|
| 2 | DF | (United States) Reggie Cannon | 1 | 0 |
| 3 | DF | (Switzerland) Reto Ziegler | 3 | 0 |
| 4 | DF | (Brazil) Bressan | 5 | 0 |
| 5 | MF | (Brazil) Thiago Santos | 9 | 0 |
| 7 | FW | (United States) Jesús Ferreira | 3 | 0 |
| 8 | MF | (Honduras) Bryan Acosta | 2 | 1 |
| 9 | MF | (United States) Fafà Picault | 2 | 0 |
| 10 | MF | (Colombia) Andrés Ricaurte | 2 | 0 |
| 12 | DF | (United States) Ryan Hollingshead | 3 | 0 |
| 13 | FW | (Czech Republic) Zdeněk Ondrášek | 1 | 0 |
| 14 | DF | (United States) Bryan Reynolds | 2 | 0 |
| 18 | MF | (United States) Brandon Servania | 1 | 0 |
| 19 | MF | (United States) Paxton Pomykal | 1 | 0 |
| 21 | MF | (Colombia) Michael Barrios | 5 | 0 |
| 22 | FW | (Ghana) Ema Twumasi | 1 | 0 |
| 29 | MF | (Argentina) Franco Jara | 4 | 0 |
| Total | | | 43 | 1 |

=== Goalkeeper stats ===
As of final match played December 1, 2020
Player name(s) in italics transferred out mid-season.

| No. | Name | Major League Soccer | | | |
| No. | Name | MIN | GA | GAA | SV |
| 1 | (United States) Jesse González | 180 | 2 | 1 | 3 |
| 20 | (United States) Jimmy Maurer | 1602 | 15 | 0.83 | 62 |
| 30 | (United States) Kyle Zobeck | 318 | 6 | 1.50 | 11 |
| 99 | (Brazil) Phelipe Megiolaro | 90 | 3 | 3.00 | 6 |
| | TOTALS | 2190 | 26 | 1.07 | 82 |

== Kits ==
| Primary | Secondary | Secondary Alt. |

| Type | Shirt | Shorts | Socks | First appearance / Info |
|---|---|---|---|---|
| Primary | Red / Blue hoops | Blue | Red / Blue hoops | MLS, February 29, 2020 against Philadelphia Union |
| Secondary | White | White | White / Blue hoops | MLS, September 23, 2020 against Atlanta United FC |
| Secondary Alternate | White | Blue | White / Blue hoops | MLS, August 21, 2020 against Houston Dynamo |

== See also ==
- FC Dallas
- 2020 in American soccer
- 2020 Major League Soccer season
