= Bressan (footballer) =

Brazilian footballer (born 1993)

Personal information
- Full name: Matheus Simonete Bressaneli
- Date of birth: 15 January 1993 (age 33)
- Place of birth: Caxias do Sul, Brazil
- Height: 1.85 m (6 ft 1 in)
- Position: Centre back

Team information
- Current team: CRB
- Number: 22

Youth career
- 2005–2010: Juventude

Senior career*
Years	Team	Apps	(Gls)
2010–2012	Juventude	6	(0)
2013–2018	Grêmio	107	(4)
2015	→ Flamengo (loan)	4	(0)
2016	→ Peñarol (loan)	11	(0)
2019–2021	FC Dallas	58	(2)
2022	Avaí	21	(0)
2023	Nantong Zhiyun	27	(0)
2024–2025	OFI	16	(1)
2025	Chapecoense	5	(0)
2026–	CRB	31	(2)

International career
2015	Brazil U23	4	(0)
Medal record
Representing Brazil
Men's Football
Pan American Games
Bronze medal – third place	2015 Toronto	Team competition
- * Club domestic league appearances and goals as of 16 November 2026

Matheus Simonete Bressaneli (born 15 January 1993), commonly known as Bressan, is a Brazilian professional footballer who plays as a centre back for CRB.

== Career ==
Born in Caxias do Sul, Bressan joined Juventude's youth setup in 2005, aged 12. In 2010, he was promoted to the first team for the 2010 Campeonato Gaúcho, and made his professional debut on 21 March 2010, in a 1–3 away loss against Novo Hamburgo. He failed to establish himself as a regular starter, however.

In the second half of 2011, Bressan won his first professional title, the Copa FGF, acting as a backup, however. In April 2012, he went on a trial period at Ligue 1 side Lille, but nothing came of it; he was also a part of the squad which won the Copa FGF for the second time of the club's history.

In December 2012, Bressan signed with Grêmio, after a partnership between the Porto Alegre's club and Juventude was established. He made his debut for the new club on 3 February 2013, in a 2–1 away loss against Internacional.

After being made a starter by manager Vanderlei Luxemburgo, Bressan played the Copa Libertadores and was also runner-up of the Campeonato Brasileiro Série A, acting as a starter in both tournaments. In 2014, he was also a part of the squad which was runner-up of the Campeonato Gaúcho, but mainly as a backup.

On 27 August 2014, Bressan would sign a new deal with Tricolor until December 2016, being subsequently loaned to Premier League side Queens Park Rangers until June 2015. However, the deal collapsed a day later, after his agent, Marcelo Lipatín, revealed details of the negotiation for the media, thus bothering the directors of the English club.

On 23 December 2014, Bressan moved to fellow league team Flamengo, in a season-long loan deal.

On 21 December 2018, Bressan signed with MLS side FC Dallas. He debuted for the first team on April 13, 2019. Following the 2021 season, Bressan's contract option was declined by Dallas.

On 3 February 2022, Bressan signed with Avaí FC after being a free-agent for 2 months.

In March 2023, Bressan joined Chinese Super League club Nantong Zhiyun.

In January 2024, Bressan joined Super League Greece side OFI on a deal until June 2025.

== Personal life ==
Bressan is a dual citizen of Brazil and Italy, having gained Italian citizenship on June 19, 2013. Bressan also has a United States green card, which was issued on June 21, 2021.

== Career statistics ==
As of match played 16 September 2025

Appearances and goals by club, season and competition
Club	Season	League			State League		Cup		Continental		Other		Total	
Club	Season	Division	Apps	Goals	Apps	Goals	Apps	Goals	Apps	Goals	Apps	Goals	Apps	Goals
Juventude	2010	Série C	1	0	4	0	0	0	—		—		5	0
Juventude	2011	Série D	0	0	4	0	—		—		—		4	0
Juventude	2012	Série D	5	0	1	0	0	0	—		8 (Note: Appearance(s) in Copa FGF)	0	14	0
Juventude	Total		6	0	9	0	0	0	—		8	0	23	0
Grêmio	2013	Série A	36	1	8	0	0	0	5 (Note: Appearance(s) in Copa Libertadores)	0	—		49	1
Grêmio	2014	Série A	18	0	7	1	0	0	1	0	—		26	1
Grêmio	2015	Série A	9	1	—		—		—		—		9	1
Grêmio	2016	Série A	6	1	6	0	0	0	3	1	1 (Note: Appearance(s) in Primeira Liga)	1	16	3
Grêmio	2017	Série A	13	0	1	0	4	0	3	0	2	0	23	0
Grêmio	2018	Série A	21	1	5	0	1	0	2	0	—		29	1
Grêmio	Total		103	4	27	1	5	0	14	1	3	1	152	7
Flamengo (loan)	2015	Série A	4	0	8	1	3	0	—		—		15	1
Peñarol (loan)	2016	Uruguayan Primera División	11	0	—		—		2 (Note: Appearance(s) in Copa Sudamericana)	1	—		13	1
FC Dallas	2019	MLS	18	1	—		2	0	—		1 (Note: Appearance(s) in MLS Cup Playoffs)	0	21	1
FC Dallas	2020	MLS	18	0	—		—		—		2	0	20	0
FC Dallas	2021	MLS	22	1	—		—		—		—		22	1
FC Dallas	Total		58	2	—		2	0	—		3	0	63	2
Avaí	2022	Série A	21	0	—		—		—		—		21	0
Nantong Zhiyun	2023	Chinese Super League	27	0	—		3	0	—		—		30	0
OFI	2023–24	Super League Greece	3	0	—		2	0	—		—		5	0
OFI	2024–25	Super League Greece	13	1	—		2	0	—		—		15	1
OFI	Total		16	1	—		4	0	—		—		20	1
Chapecoense	2025	Série B	5	0	—		—		—		—		5	0
Career total			261	7	44	2	17	0	16	2	14	1	342	12

== Honours ==
Juventude

- Copa FGF: 2011, 2012

Grêmio

- Copa Libertadores: 2017
- Recopa Sudamericana: 2018
