= Phelipe Megiolaro =

Brazilian footballer

Personal information
- Full name: Phelipe Megiolaro Alves
- Date of birth: 8 February 1999 (age 27)
- Place of birth: Campinas, Brazil
- Height: 1.85 m (6 ft 1 in)
- Position: Goalkeeper

Team information
- Current team: Jataiense

Youth career
- Campinas
- 2008–2012: Ponte Preta
- 2013–2018: Grêmio

Senior career*
Years	Team	Apps	(Gls)
2019–2022	Grêmio	2	(0)
2020–2021	→ FC Dallas (loan)	12	(0)
2023	Vissel Kobe	2	(0)
2024–2026	Yokohama FC	2	(0)
2026–	Jataiense	0	(0)

International career^{‡}
2016	Brazil U18	0	(0)
2017–2019	Brazil U20	12	(0)
2019	Brazil U23	3	(0)
- * Club domestic league appearances and goals as of 8 March 2026 ‡ National team caps and goals as of 4 July 2021, 12:20 (UTC)

Phelipe Megiolaro Alves (born 8 February 1999), commonly known as Phelipe Megiolaro, is a Brazilian professional footballer who plays as a goalkeeper. Plays for Jataiense

== Club career ==
=== Grêmio ===
Born in Campinas, Brazil, Phelipe Megiolaro joined the Grêmio's Academy at the age of 13 in 2013, from Ponte Preta. On 5 December 2018, he signed a new contract with the club, until the end of 2020. Promoted to the main squad ahead of the 2019 season, Phelipe was mainly a third-choice behind Paulo Victor and Júlio César. On 19 October of that year, as the former was being rested for the 2019 Copa Libertadores semifinals and the latter was struggling with injuries, he made his first team – and Série A – debut by starting in a 2–1 away loss against Fortaleza.

=== FC Dallas ===
On 18 August 2020, it was announced that Megiolaro had signed for FC Dallas in Major League Soccer on loan until the end of the 2020 season.

=== Vissel Kobe ===
On 15 February 2023, Megiolaro moved abroad to Japan and transferred to J1 League club Vissel Kobe ahead of the 2023 season. In March 2024, he made his debut for the club in a 0–2 J.League Cup defeat to Nagoya Grampus. He then only made one more appearance throughout the rest of the 2023 season, in which he conceded 5 goals in a 0–5 defeat to Sanfrecce Hiroshima.

=== Yokohama FC ===
In January 2024, it was announced that Megiolaro would be moving to J2 League club Yokohama FC ahead of the 2024 season.

Jataiense

It was officially announced by the club on September 25, 2026, as a reinforcement for the 2027 season for the Campeonato Goiano and the Brasileirão Série D from the same year.

== International career ==
Phelipe Megiolaro represented Brazil with the under-20s in the 2017 Toulon Tournament. On 21 September 2018, he was called up to the full side by manager Tite for friendlies against Saudi Arabia and Argentina, but remained as an unused substitute.

Back at the under-20s, Phelipe Megiolaro was an undisputed starter during the 2019 South American U-20 Championship.

== Career statistics ==
=== Club ===
As of 3 April 2024.

Appearances and goals by club, season and competition
Club	Season	League			State League		National Cup		Continental		Other		Total	
Club	Season	Division	Apps	Goals	Apps	Goals	Apps	Goals	Apps	Goals	Apps	Goals	Apps	Goals
Grêmio	2019	Série A	2	0	0	0	0	0	0	0	—		2	0
Grêmio	2020	Série A	—		—		—		—		—		0	0
Grêmio	2021	Série A	—		—		—		—		—		0	0
Grêmio	Total		2	0	0	0	0	0	0	0	—		2	0
FC Dallas (loan)	2020	MLS	1	0	—		—		—		—		1	0
FC Dallas (loan)	2021	MLS	11	0	—		—		—		—		11	0
FC Dallas (loan)	Total		12	0	—		—		—		—		12	0
Vissel Kobe	2023	J1 League	0	0	—		0	0	—		2 (Note: Appearances in the J. League Cup)	0	0	0
Vissel Kobe	Total		0	0	—		0	0	—		2	0	2	0
Yokohama FC	2024	J2 League	0	0	—		0	0	—		0	0	0	0
Yokohama FC	Total		0	0	—		0	0	—		0	0	0	0
Career total			14	0	0	0	0	0	0	0	2	0	16	0

=== International ===
As of 29 March 2021.

National team	Year	Competitive		Friendly		Total	
National team	Year	Apps	Goals	Apps	Goals	Apps	Goals
Brazil U18	2016	—		—		0	0
Brazil U18	Total	0	0	0	0	0	0
Brazil U20	2017	3 (Note: Appearance(s) in Toulon Tournament.)	0	—		3	0
Brazil U20	2019	9 (Note: Appearance(s) in CONMEBOL Sudamericano Sub-20.)	0	—		9	0
Brazil U20	Total	12	0	0	0	12	0
Brazil U23	2019	1 (Note: Appearance(s) in preparatory friendly matches for CONMEBOL Pre-Olympic Tournament.)	0	—		1	0
Brazil U23	2020	0	0	—		0	0
Brazil U23	Total	1	0	0	0	1	0
Brazil	2018	—		0	0	0	0
Brazil	2019	—		0	0	0	0
Brazil	Total	0	0	0	0	0	0
Total		13	0	0	0	13	0

== Honours ==
Grêmio

- Campeonato Gaúcho: 2019

Vissel Kobe

- J1 League: 2023
