= Andrés Ricaurte =

Colombian footballer (born 1991)

Personal information
- Full name: Andrés Ricaurte Vélez
- Date of birth: 3 October 1991 (age 35)
- Place of birth: Medellín, Colombia
- Height: 1.82 m (6 ft 0 in)
- Position: Attacking midfielder

Team information
- Current team: Fortaleza
- Number: 8

Youth career
- Belén Los Alpes
- Estudiantil
- Campoamor
- 2010–2011: Rionegro Águilas

Senior career*
Years	Team	Apps	(Gls)
2011–2015	Rionegro Águilas	14	(2)
2016	Leones	36	(10)
2017	Atlético Huila	40	(1)
2018–2023	Independiente Medellín	90	(11)
2020–2021	→ FC Dallas (loan)	40	(2)
2024	Emelec	14	(2)
2025–	Fortaleza	42	(2)
- * Club domestic league appearances and goals as of 11 December 2025

Andrés Ricaurte Vélez (born 3 October 1991) is a Colombian professional footballer who plays as a midfielder for Fortaleza.

== Club career ==
Born in Medellín, Ricaurte graduated from the Rionegro Águilas youth academy. He made his first team debut on 4 May 2011, coming on as a second-half substitute in a 1–2 Copa Colombia away loss against Independiente Medellín.

Ricaurte made his Categoría Primera A debut on 14 April 2012, playing the last four minutes in a 1–1 home draw against the same opponent. His first goal in the category occurred on 10 November, as he scored the opener in a 3–2 away defeat of Atlético Huila.

After being rarely used, Ricaurte moved to Categoría Primera B side Leones ahead of the 2016 season. He scored a career-best ten goals for the side, which included a hat-trick in a 4–1 away routing of Bogotá FC on 20 March.

In 2017, Ricaurte joined Atlético Huila back in the top tier. On 15 December of that year, after being an ever-present figure for the side, he agreed to a contract with Independiente Medellín.

He scored his first goal of the 2018 season on 11 February, a game winner against Boyaca Chico. On 15 October he scored another game winner against América de Cali, and three days later he scored in a 2–0 victory against Atlético Bucaramanga. Medellin eventually made the final of the Finalizacion tournament, but lost 5–4 to Junior. The following year, Ricaurte was part of the Medellin squad that won the 2019 Copa Colombia, and scored a goal in the first leg of the semifinals against Deportivo Pasto.

On 14 August 2020, MLS side FC Dallas officially confirmed Ricaurte's transfer, announcing the move as an initial loan with an option to make the deal permanent in December 2021. On 12 September, he scored his first goal for the club in a 2–1 victory against Houston Dynamo. On 2 May 2021, he scored in a 4–1 victory over Portland Timbers. On 30 November 2021, Dallas decided not to make the deal permanent, and he was released by the club, having made 42 appearances and scored two goals.

He returned to Medellin for the 2022 season, where he was part of the squad that finished runner-up in the 2022 Finalizacion, making 28 appearances in the Finalizacion tournament and scoring once in a victory against Unión Magdalena at Estadio Sierra Nevada. For the 2023 season, he was also part of the Medellin squad which finished runner-up to Junior, but was used sporadically under Alfredo Arias, and his contract was not renewed for the 2024 season.

== Personal life ==
Ricaurte's father Carlos was also a footballer and a midfielder who notably represented Atlético Nacional. His cousin Juan Guillermo, was also a professional player.

Ricaurte has a bachelor's in Business Administration, a major he got during his early years playing in Colombia, and is currently pursuing his master's degree in Sports Management while being enrolled at Johan Cruyff Institute.

== Career statistics ==
As of 2 December 2020

Club	Season	League			Cup		Continental		Other		Total	
Club	Season	Division	Apps	Goals	Apps	Goals	Apps	Goals	Apps	Goals	Apps	Goals
Rionegro Águilas	2011	Categoría Primera A	0	0	4	0	—		—		4	0
Rionegro Águilas	2012	Categoría Primera A	6	1	6	0	—		—		12	1
Rionegro Águilas	2013	Categoría Primera A	4	0	7	0	0	0	—		11	0
Rionegro Águilas	2014	Categoría Primera A	1	0	7	0	0	0	—		8	0
Rionegro Águilas	2015	Categoría Primera A	3	1	0	0	—		—		3	1
Rionegro Águilas	Total		14	2	24	0	0	0	—		38	2
Leones	2016	Categoría Primera B	36	10	5	0	—		—		41	10
Atlético Huila	2017	Categoría Primera A	40	1	2	0	—		—		42	1
Independiente Medellín	2018	Categoría Primera A	46	5	2	0	2 (Note: Appearance(s) in Copa Sudamericana)	0	—		50	5
Independiente Medellín	2019	Categoría Primera A	37	4	8	1	2 (Note: Appearance(s) in Copa Libertadores)	0	—		47	5
Independiente Medellín	2020	Categoría Primera A	7	2	—		6	1	—		13	3
Independiente Medellín	Total		90	11	10	1	10	1	—		110	13
FC Dallas (loan)	2020	MLS	14	1	—		—		2 (Note: Appearance(s) in MLS Cup Playoffs)	0	16	1
FC Dallas (loan)	2021	MLS	26	1	—		—		—		26	1
Total			220	26	41	1	10	1	2	0	273	28
