= Franco Jara =

Argentine association football player

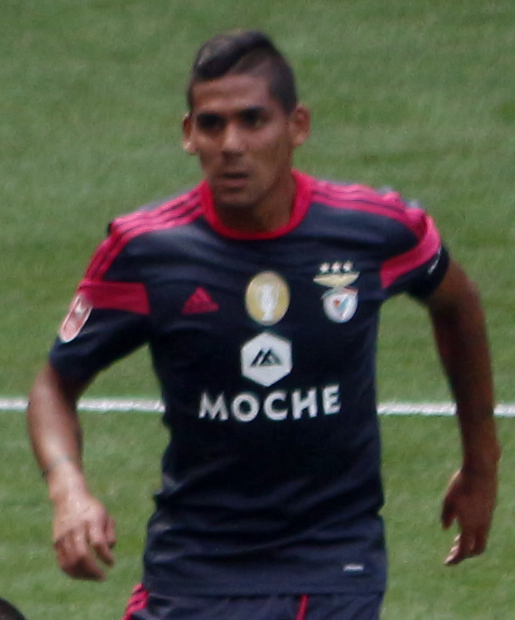

Personal information
- Full name: Franco Daniel Jara
- Date of birth: 15 July 1988 (age 38)
- Place of birth: Villa María, Argentina
- Height: 1.79 m (5 ft 10 in)
- Position: Forward

Youth career
- Arsenal Sarandí

Senior career*
Years	Team	Apps	(Gls)
2007–2010	Arsenal Sarandí	49	(9)
2010–2015	Benfica	29	(6)
2011–2012	→ Granada (loan)	31	(3)
2012–2013	→ San Lorenzo (loan)	26	(2)
2013–2014	→ Estudiantes (loan)	23	(4)
2015	Olympiacos	12	(3)
2015–2020	Pachuca	130	(63)
2020–2023	FC Dallas	82	(17)
2023–2026	Belgrano	77	(23)
2026	Instituto	11	(1)

International career
2010–2011	Argentina	4	(1)
- * Club domestic league appearances and goals as of 18:14, 10 May 2026 (UTC)

Franco Daniel Jara (born 15 July 1988) is an Argentine professional footballer who plays as a forward.

Jara is the all-time leading scorer for Pachuca.

== Club career ==
Born in Villa María, Córdoba, Jara made his professional debut with Arsenal de Sarandí, first appearing in the Primera División in a 0–1 home loss against Argentinos Juniors on 23 May 2008. He scored his first goal for the club on 10 April of the following year, in a 1–1 draw at Club Atlético Colón.

On 30 January 2010, Jara signed a five-year deal with Portuguese champions S.L. Benfica for a transfer fee of €5.5 million, effective for the beginning of 2010–11. He scored in his second official game, a 1–2 home loss to Académica de Coimbra on 15 August, and finished his first season with 43 competitive appearances (11 goals).

Jara was loaned to newly promoted La Liga side Granada CF in late August 2011, moving to Andalusia alongside several other Benfica teammates. On 21 July of the following year, still owned by the latter, he joined San Lorenzo de Almagro, and the same happened in the 2013–14 campaign, this time with Estudiantes de La Plata.

On 24 January 2015, Jara signed for two and a half years with Olympiacos F.C. in a €1.5 million transfer fee. His Super League Greece debut occurred on 1 February in a 2–0 away win over Veria FC. He scored his first goal two months later, in a 3–1 victory at Panthrakikos FC.

On 23 May 2015, Jara intercepted a backward pass inside the area in the last minute of the first half of the final of the Greek Football Cup, helping the Piraeus-based team to a record 27th conquest after defeating Skoda Xanthi F.C. 3–1 at the Olympic Stadium. On 9 September, he joined Mexican club C.F. Pachuca on a free transfer. He scored a career-best 17 times while at the service of the latter side in 2015–16's Liga MX, helping them win the Clausura tournament, adding six in eight matches for the champions of the following season's CONCACAF Champions League and being voted the competition's best player.

Jara signed for FC Dallas of the Major League Soccer on 21 January 2020, with the deal being made effective in July. On 10 January 2023, Jara and Dallas mutually agreed to terminate his contract at the club.

On 11 January 2023, Jara signed a contract with Belgrano while he was a free agent.

== International career ==
On 19 January 2010, Jara was called up to the Argentina national team for a friendly match with Costa Rica on the 27th. The game finished 3–2, and he scored the match-winning goal.

Jara earned his second cap on 10 February 2010, in a 2–1 win against Jamaica.

== Personal life ==
On 10 September 2014, Jara suffered a car accident and crashed into a tree, but did not suffer major injuries.

== Career statistics ==
=== Club ===
As of match played 10 December 2024

Appearances and goals by club, season and competition
Club	Season	League			National Cup		League Cup		Continental		Other		Total	
Club	Season	Division	Apps	Goals	Apps	Goals	Apps	Goals	Apps	Goals	Apps	Goals	Apps	Goals
Arsenal Sarandí	2007–08	Primera División	2	0	—		—		—		—		2	0
Arsenal Sarandí	2008–09	Primera División	13	2	—		—		2 (Note: Appearance(s) in Copa Sudamericana)	0	—		15	0
Arsenal Sarandí	2009–10	Primera División	34	7	—		—		—		—		34	7
Arsenal Sarandí	Total		49	9	0	0	0	0	2	0	0	0	51	7
Benfica	2010–11	Primeira Liga	26	6	2	0	5	3	9 (Note: Six appearances and two goals in UEFA Europa League and three appearances in UEFA Champions League)	2	1 (Note: Appearance(s) in Supertaça Cândido de Oliveira)	0	43	11
Benfica	2011–12	Primeira Liga	1	0	—		1 (Note: Appearance(s) in UEFA Champions League)	0	—		—		2	0
Benfica	2014–15	Primeira Liga	2	0	—		—		—		0	0	2	0
Benfica	Total		29	6	2	0	6	3	9	2	1	0	47	11
Granada (loan)	2011–12	La Liga	31	3	2	0	—		—		—		33	3
San Lorenzo (loan)	2012–13	Primera División	26	2	1	0	—		—		—		27	2
Estudiantes (loan)	2013–14	Primera División	23	4	1	0	—		—		—		24	4
Olympiacos	2014–15	Super League	10	3	5	3	—		—		—		15	6
Olympiacos	2015–16	Super League	2	0	—		—		—		—		2	0
Olympiacos	Total		12	3	5	3	0	0	0	0	0	0	17	3
Pachuca	2015–16	Liga MX	25	14	5	1	—		—		7 (Note: Six Appearances and three goals in Liga MX Playoffs and one appearance in Copa Campeón de Campeones)	3	37	18
Pachuca	2016–17	Liga MX	25	14	—		—		8 (Note: Appearance(s) in CONCACAF Champions League)	6	2 (Note: Appearance(s) in Liga MX Playoffs)	0	35	20
Pachuca	2017–18	Liga MX	22	4	7	3	—		3 (Note: Appearance(s) in FIFA Club World Cup)	1	—		32	8
Pachuca	2018–19	Liga MX	32	16	4	5	—		—		1	0	37	21
Pachuca	2019–20	Liga MX	26	15	2	1	—		—		—		28	16
Pachuca	Total		130	63	18	10	0	0	11	5	10	3	169	83
FC Dallas	2020	MLS	21	7	—		—		—		2 (Note: Appearance(s) in MLS Cup Playoffs)	0	23	7
FC Dallas	2021	MLS	29	7	—		—		—		—		29	7
FC Dallas	2022	MLS	32	3	2	2	—		—		—		34	5
FC Dallas	Total		82	17	2	2	0	0	0	0	2	0	86	19
Belgrano	2023	Primera División	25	3	1	0	—		—		—		26	3
Belgrano	2024	Primera División	23	15	—		—		7	3	—		30	18
Belgrano	Total		48	18	1	0	0	0	7	3	0	0	56	21
Career total			430	125	31	12	6	3	29	10	13	3	509	153

=== International ===
Appearances and goals by national team and year
National team	Year	Apps	Goals
Argentina	2010	3	1
Argentina	2011	1	0
Total		4	1

=== International goals ===
No.	Date	Venue	Opponent	Score	Result	Competition	Ref.
1	26 January 2010	Ingeniero Hilario Sánchez, San Juan, Argentina	Costa Rica	3–2	3–2	Friendly	

== Honours ==
Benfica

- Primeira Liga: 2014–15
- Taça da Liga: 2010–11
- Supertaça Cândido de Oliveira: 2014

Olympiacos

- Super League Greece: 2014–15
- Greek Cup: 2014–15

Pachuca

- Liga MX: Clausura 2016
- CONCACAF Champions League: 2016–17

Individual

- CONCACAF Champions League Golden Ball: 2016–17
