= Matt Hedges =

American soccer player (born 1990)

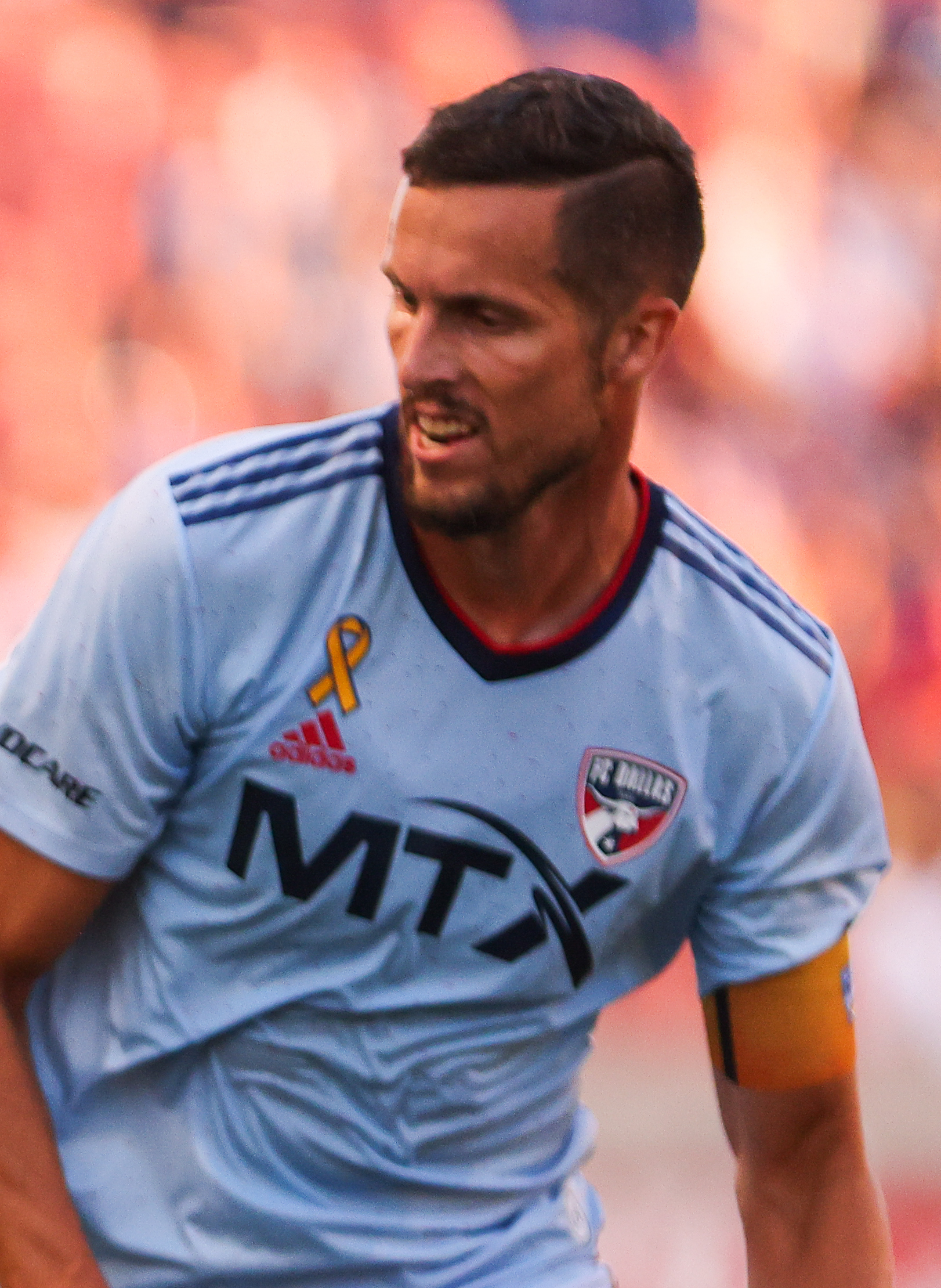
- Hedges with FC Dallas in 2021

Personal information
- Full name: Matthew James Hedges
- Date of birth: April 1, 1990 (age 36)
- Place of birth: Rochester, New York, U.S.
- Height: 6 ft 4 in (1.93 m)
- Position: Center-back

College career
Years	Team	Apps	(Gls)
2008–2010	Butler Bulldogs	59	(12)
2011	North Carolina Tar Heels	26	(6)

Senior career*
Years	Team	Apps	(Gls)
2009	Fort Wayne Fever	9	(0)
2010–2011	Reading United	24	(4)
2012–2022	FC Dallas	310	(18)
2023	Toronto FC	14	(0)
2023–2024	Austin FC	21	(2)
2025	Des Moines Menace	2	(0)
2025	FC Dallas	0	(0)

International career^{‡}
2015–2017	United States	5	(0)

Managerial career
- 2026–: North Texas SC (assistant)
Medal record
Representing United States
Winner	CONCACAF Gold Cup	2017
- * Club domestic league appearances and goals as of 23:19, September 15, 2024 (UTC) ‡ National team caps and goals as of July 19, 2017

Matthew James Hedges (born April 1, 1990) is an American former professional soccer player who played as a center-back. Hedges is currently the assistant manager for North Texas SC.

He most notably played for FC Dallas, Toronto FC, and Austin FC.

Hedges was considered one of the best defenders in the MLS since 2014, landing on the MLS Best XI in 2015 and 2016, and winning the MLS Defender of the Year Award in 2016.

== Club career ==
=== College and amateur ===
Hedges was born in New York but grew up in Carmel, Indiana. He attended Carmel High School (Carmel, Indiana), where he was a member of the 2006 Greyhounds soccer team that went undefeated, and won both the IHSAA Boys' Soccer State Championship and the NSCAA National Championship. He played college soccer at Butler University between 2008 and 2010, and at the University of North Carolina in 2011.

During his time at Butler, Hedges was named to the NSCAA All-America Second Team as a junior, and he was also named Horizon League Defender of the Year in both his junior and sophomore years. After transferring to North Carolina, he was named ACC Defensive Player of the Year and to the NSCAA All-America First Team. He scored 6 times on the season and helped lead the Tar Heels defense to a 0.69 goals-against average en route to the 2011 NCAA National Championship.

Hedges spent time with USL Premier Development League club Fort Wayne Fever in 2009, making 9 appearances. He also spent time with USL PDL club Reading United in 2010 and 2011, scoring 4 goals in 24 appearances.

=== Professional ===
FC Dallas selected Hedges in the first round (No. 11 overall) of the 2012 MLS SuperDraft. He made his professional debut on April 5, 2012, in a 1–0 victory against the New England Revolution. Due to injuries and his excellent play for a rookie, he became a regular starter for the club. His first goal in the 2014 season was a header in the 90th minute against Sporting Kansas City off a free kick taken by Michel. The goal tied the game, 1–1.

Hedges captained the team for the first time in 2014, a move that eventually became permanent. Since becoming captain, he has led the club into the MLS playoffs in 2014, 2015, and 2016. Also in 2015, the club was the Western Conference regular season champions and Supporters' Shield runner-up. For the 2015 MLS season, he was named to the Best XI and as a finalist for Defender of the Year. Dallas was even more successful in 2016, winning the Supporters' Shield and the Lamar Hunt U.S. Open Cup. Hedges was once again named to the Best XI and, this time, was the winner of the Defender of the Year award.

In 2020, he became the all-time leader in MLS appearances for FC Dallas, passing Jason Kreis.

In December 2022, he signed a two-year contract with Toronto FC beginning in the 2023 season.

In July 2023, he was traded to Austin FC in exchange for General Allocation Money. He signed a new contract with the club through the 2024 season, with options for 2025 and 2026.

In October 2025, he signed a one-day deal with FC Dallas to retire as a member of the squad.

== International career ==
Hedges made his United States men's national soccer team debut on February 8, 2015, when he came on as a substitute in the 72nd minute against Panama in a friendly. He was selected to the U.S. squad for the 2017 CONCACAF Gold Cup, which the U.S. ended up winning. Hedges started and played 90 minutes in victories over Martinique in group stage play and El Salvador in the quarterfinals.

== Career statistics ==
As of match played September 14, 2024

Appearances and goals by club, season and competition
Club	Season	League			Playoffs		U.S. Open Cup		CONCACAF		Other		Total	
Club	Season	Division	Apps	Goals	Apps	Goals	Apps	Goals	Apps	Goals	Apps	Goals	Apps	Goals
Fort Wayne Fever	2009	Premier Development League	9	0	—		—		—		—		9	0
Reading United	2010	Premier Development League	?	?	—		1	0	—		—		?	?
Reading United	2011	Premier Development League	?	?	—		1	0	—		—		?	?
Reading United	Total		26	6	0	0	2	0	0	0	0	0	28	6
FC Dallas	2012	Major League Soccer	28	3	—		1	0	—		—		29	3
FC Dallas	2013	Major League Soccer	33	3	—		2	1	—		—		35	4
FC Dallas	2014	Major League Soccer	32	3	3	0	2	0	—		—		37	3
FC Dallas	2015	Major League Soccer	31	1	4	0	1	0	—		—		36	1
FC Dallas	2016	Major League Soccer	26	1	2	0	4	2	3	1	—		35	4
FC Dallas	2017	Major League Soccer	27	2	—		1	0	4	0	—		32	2
FC Dallas	2018	Major League Soccer	33	2	1	1	2	0	2	0	—		38	3
FC Dallas	2019	Major League Soccer	33	1	1	1	2	1	—		—		36	3
FC Dallas	2020	Major League Soccer	19	0	2	0	—		—		—		21	0
FC Dallas	2021	Major League Soccer	20	1	—		—		—		—		20	1
FC Dallas	2022	Major League Soccer	28	1	2	0	—		—		—		30	1
FC Dallas	Total		310	18	15	2	15	4	9	1	0	0	349	25
Toronto FC	2023	Major League Soccer	14	0	—		0	0	—		—		14	0
Austin FC	2023	Major League Soccer	6	1	—		—		—		1 (Note: Appearance(s) in Leagues Cup)	0	7	1
Austin FC	2024	Major League Soccer	15	1	0	0	—		—		3	0	18	1
Austin FC	Total		21	2	0	0	0	0	0	0	4	0	25	2
Career total			381	17	2	24	17	4	9	1	4	0	426	33

== Honors ==
University of North Carolina

- NCAA National Champions: 2011

FC Dallas

- U.S. Open Cup: 2016
- Supporters' Shield: 2016

United States

- CONCACAF Gold Cup: 2017

Individual

- Horizon League Defender of the Year: 2009, 2010
- ACC Defender of the Year: 2011
- NCAA 1st Team All America: 2011
- MLS Best XI: 2015, 2016
- MLS Defender of the Year: 2016
- MLS All-Star: 2017, 2018, 2019

== See also ==
- List of current Major League Soccer players with national team caps
