= Jesús Ferreira =

Soccer player (born 2000)

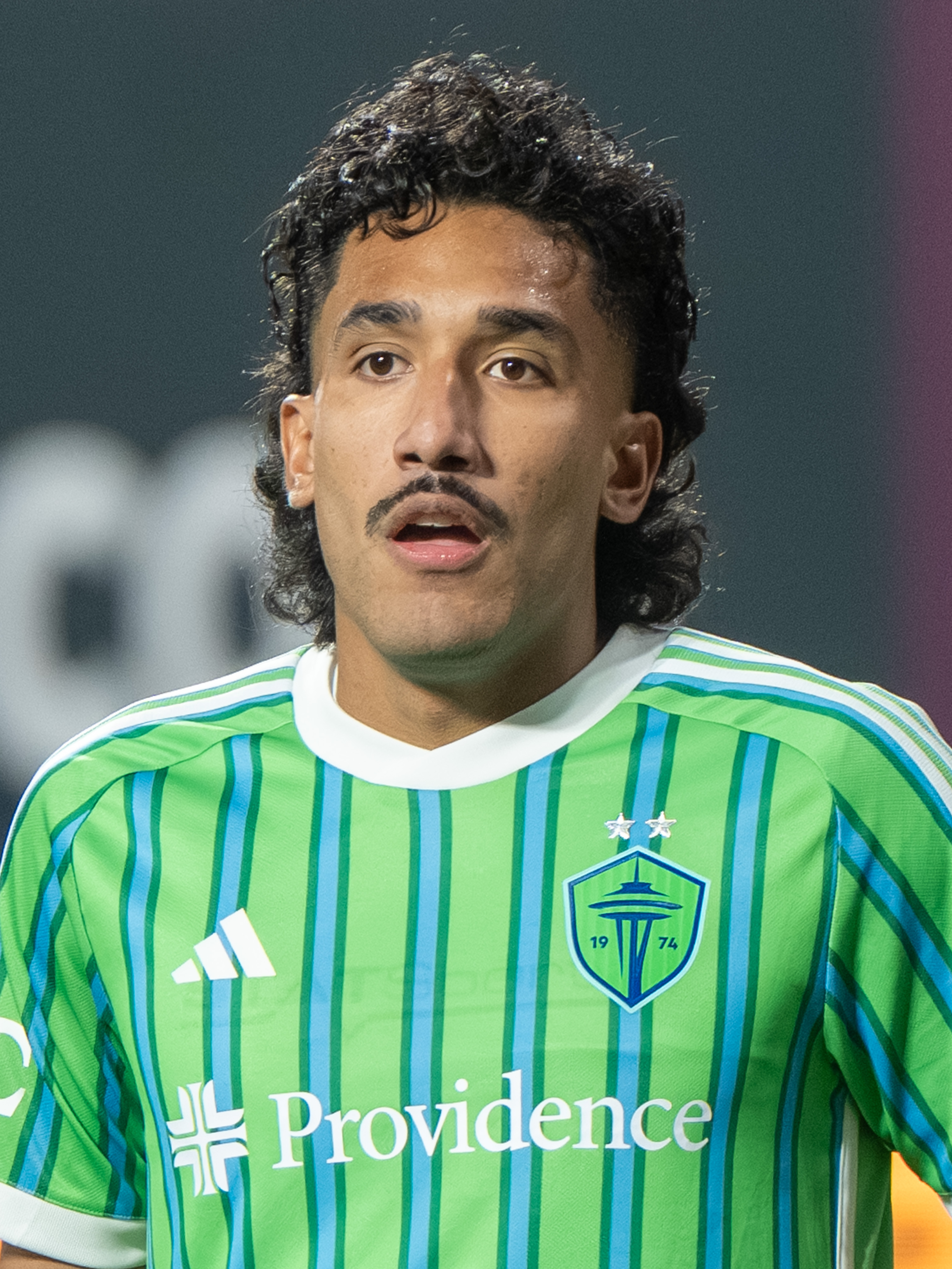
- Ferreira with Seattle Sounders FC in 2025

Personal information
- Full name: Jesús David Ferreira Castro
- Date of birth: December 24, 2000 (age 25)
- Place of birth: Santa Marta, Colombia
- Height: 5 ft 8 in (1.73 m)
- Position: Forward

Team information
- Current team: Seattle Sounders FC
- Number: 27

Youth career
- 2009–2016: FC Dallas

Senior career*
Years	Team	Apps	(Gls)
2017–2024	FC Dallas	163	(53)
2018	→ Tulsa Roughnecks FC (loan)	14	(6)
2025–	Seattle Sounders FC	57	(6)

International career^{‡}
2021	United States U23	4	(1)
2020–2023	United States	23	(15)
- * Club domestic league appearances and goals as of November 7, 2026 ‡ National team caps and goals as of July 12, 2023

Jesús David Ferreira Castro (born December 24, 2000) is a professional soccer player who plays as a forward for Major League Soccer club Seattle Sounders FC. Born in Colombia, he has represented the United States national team.

He scored his first professional goal on his debut in June 2017 against Real Salt Lake. In 2018, Ferreira was loaned to United Soccer League side Tulsa Roughnecks where he scored six goals in 14 matches, including his first career hat-trick. The next season, Ferreira returned to FC Dallas and broke through as a starter under coach Luchi Gonzalez. In January 2022, Ferreira signed a designated player contract with Dallas. Ferreira joined Seattle Sounders FC in 2025.

Ferreira made his senior debut for the United States in February 2020 against Costa Rica. He was then part of the under-23 side that failed to qualify for the Summer Olympics in March 2020. Ferreira scored his first two goals for the United States in January 2021 against Trinidad and Tobago.

== Club career ==
=== Youth ===
Ferreira moved from Colombia to Dallas, Texas at the age of 10 after his father, David Ferreira, signed with FC Dallas. He joined the club's youth side and progressed through the ranks before signing a homegrown contract on November 17, 2016.

=== FC Dallas ===
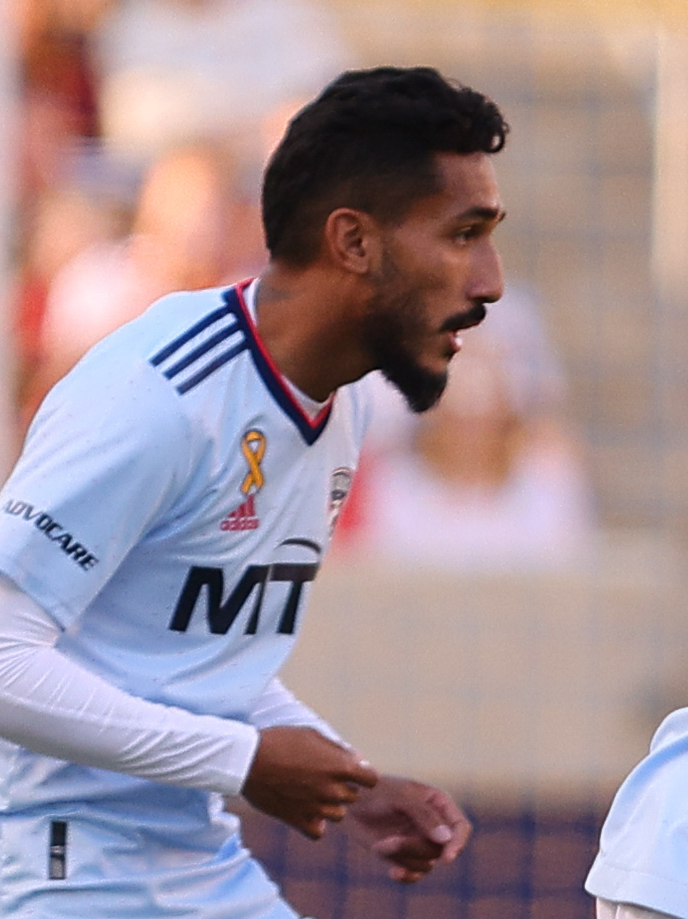
Ferreira with FC Dallas in 2021.

Ferreira made his professional debut on June 3, 2017, as a 71st-minute substitute during a 6–2 win over Real Salt Lake, scoring his first goal in the 89th minute of the game.

On December 10, 2019, Ferreira signed a four-year contract with FC Dallas.

Ferreira recorded his first career MLS brace on August 29, 2021, scoring twice in a 5–3 win over Austin FC.

On January 18, 2022, Ferreira signed a designated player contract with FC Dallas, keeping him at the club until 2025. Ferreira was selected as MLS player of the week in week 4 of the 2022 season after recording a hat-trick and an assist for FC Dallas in their 4–1 victory over the Portland Timbers. He finished the 2022 season with 18 goals in 35 matches—his best for the club. In week two of the 2023 season, Ferreira was named to the league's Team of the Matchday after registering a brace in a 3–1 win over LA Galaxy.

According to media reports, Russian club FC Spartak Moscow offered $13 million to FC Dallas to sign Ferreira in January 2024. The transaction was allegedly halted by Major League Soccer, which owns all player contracts, due to the suspension of sports business relationships after the Russian invasion of Ukraine. Ferreira remained with FC Dallas, where he had a contract through the 2025 season, but made fewer appearances in the 2024 season due to injuries. During his eight seasons with FC Dallas, he scored a total of 55 goals in 181 appearances.

==== Loan to Tulsa Roughnecks FC ====
In May 2018, Ferreira was loaned to Tulsa Roughnecks FC and scored his first goal for Tulsa on August 18, 2018, against Real Monarchs and his first career hat-trick on September 5, 2018, against Seattle Sounders FC 2.

=== Seattle Sounders FC ===
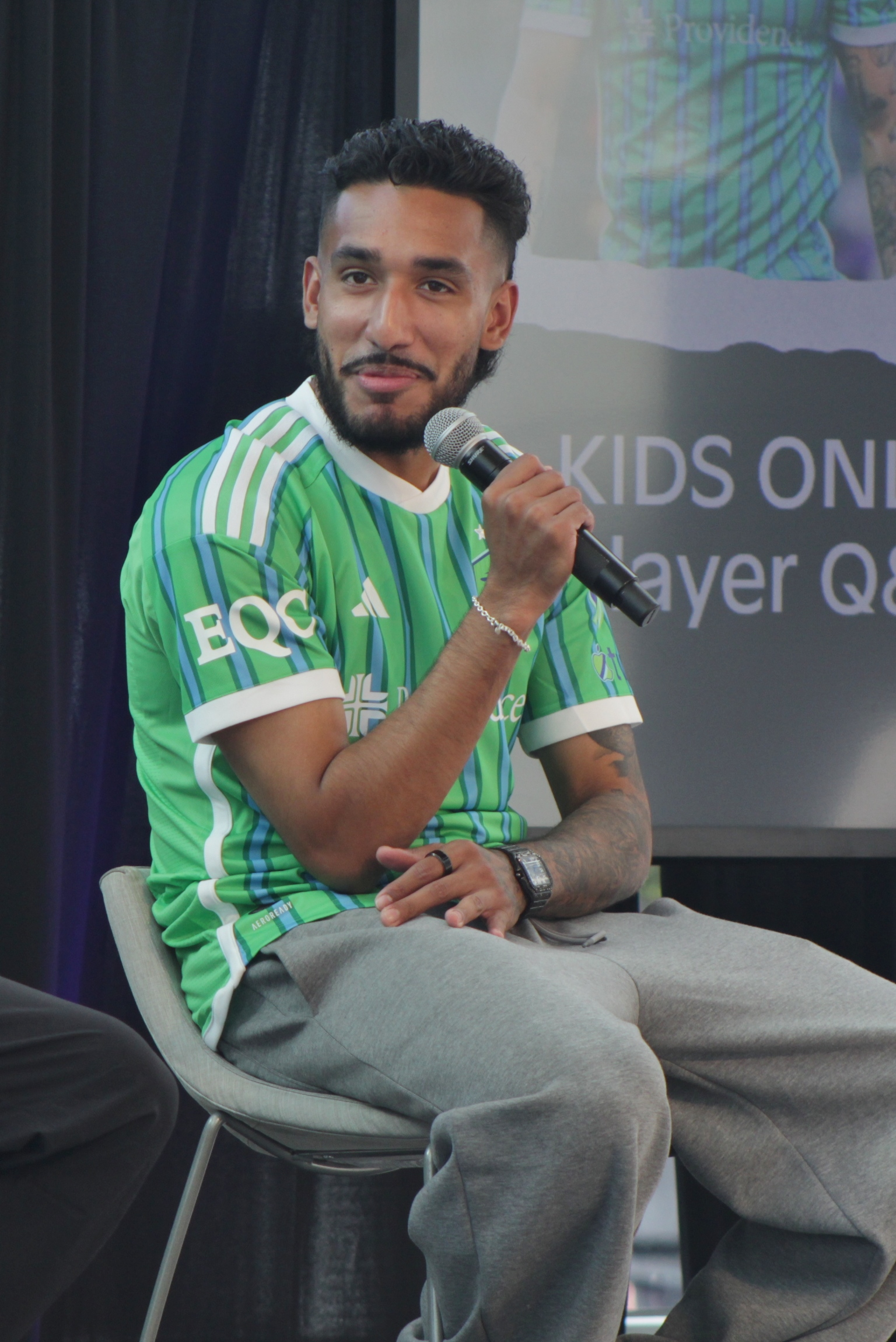
Ferreira with Seattle Sounders FC in 2025.

On January 8, 2025, Ferreira was signed to a three-year contract by Seattle Sounders FC after a trade with FC Dallas for winger Léo Chú and up to $2.3 million in general allocation money over a two-year period. The rights to a future international transfer fee for Ferreira would also be split between Seattle and Dallas. He contributed five assists in his first fifteen matches with Seattle, but was unable to score a goal. Ferreira's first goal came on May 28 in a 1–0 win against San Diego FC a few days after his daughter was born.

== International career ==
Prior to obtaining United States citizenship, Ferreira attended United States Soccer Federation youth camps. In 2016, Ferreira was called up to the United States under-17 squad. He became a US citizen in December 2019.

In 2019, Ferreira received a call-up to the United States under-23 team ahead of qualifying games for the 2020 Summer Olympics. After that had been postponed due to the COVID-19 pandemic, he was called up again to the 2020 CONCACAF Men's Olympic Qualifying Championship team. The team would fail to qualify for the Olympics.

Ferreira made his first senior U.S. camp in January 2020. On February 1, 2020, he made his senior international debut for the United States in its friendly against Costa Rica. On January 31, 2021, Ferreira scored his first and second goals at that level and was named Man of the Match in a game following his second January camp with the senior team.

On June 10, 2022, Ferreira scored his first international hat-trick by scoring four goals against Grenada in a 5–0 victory during his 2022–23 CONCACAF Nations League A campaign. He has been nicknamed "Pirate of the Caribbean" for his history of high-scoring games against national teams in the Caribbean area.

Ferreira was a member of the United States' roster for the 2022 FIFA World Cup, appearing once at the tournament in the 3–1 round of 16 loss to the Netherlands on December 3, 2022.

On June 28, 2023, Ferreira scored his second international hat-trick with three goals in a 6–0 victory over St. Kitts and Nevis during the 2023 CONCACAF Gold Cup in the second round of the group stage, eliminating the Sugar Boys from the tournament. He completed his third international hat-trick in the following match, a 6–0 victory against Trinidad and Tobago, making him the first United States men's player to score hat-tricks in consecutive matches.

He went on to score the equalizer against Panama in the 2023 CONCACAF Gold Cup semifinals in the 105th minute on July 12, 2023, but missed the first kick in the penalty shootout, where the United States lost 2–3. Ferreira was awarded the Golden Boot for scoring seven goals, the most of any player in the tournament.

== Personal life ==
He is the son of David Ferreira, a professional player who played for clubs including América de Cali, Atlético Paranaense, FC Dallas and the Colombia national team. In December 2019, Jesus Ferreira received U.S. citizenship.

Ferreira owns a 10-acre (4.0 ha) farm near Dallas where he raises chickens and three cows. His girlfriend gave birth to the couple's first child, a daughter, in May 2025.

== Career statistics ==
=== Club ===
As of match played November 19, 2026

Appearances and goals by club, season and competition
Club	Season	League			Playoffs		U.S. Open Cup		Continental		Other		Total	
Club	Season	Division	Apps	Goals	Apps	Goals	Apps	Goals	Apps	Goals	Apps	Goals	Apps	Goals
FC Dallas	2017	MLS	1	1	—		—		—		—		1	1
FC Dallas	2018	MLS	1	0	—		—		—		—		1	0
FC Dallas	2019	MLS	33	8	1	0	2	0	—		—		36	8
FC Dallas	2020	MLS	19	1	2	0	—		—		—		21	1
FC Dallas	2021	MLS	27	8	—		—		—		—		27	8
FC Dallas	2022	MLS	33	18	2	0	2	0	—		—		37	18
FC Dallas	2023	MLS	27	12	2	1	1	0	—		4 (Note: Appearances in Leagues Cup)	1	34	14
FC Dallas	2024	MLS	22	5	—		2	0	—		—		24	5
FC Dallas	Total		163	53	7	1	7	0	—		4	1	181	55
Tulsa Roughnecks (loan)	2018	USL	14	6	—		—		—		—		14	6
Seattle Sounders FC	2025	MLS	32	4	3	0	—		4 (Note: Appearances in CONCACAF Champions Cup)	0	9 (Note: Three appearances in FIFA Club World Cup, six appearances and one goal in Leagues Cup)	1	48	5
Seattle Sounders FC	2026	MLS	25	2	1	0	—		4	0	3	0	33	2
Seattle Sounders FC	Total		57	6	4	0	—		8	0	12	1	81	7
Career total			234	65	11	1	7	0	8	0	16	2	276	68

=== International ===
As of match played July 12, 2023

Appearances and goals by national team and year
National team	Year	Apps	Goals
United States	2020	1	0
United States	2021	4	2
United States	2022	11	5
United States	2023	7	8
United States	2024	0	0
United States	2025	0	0
Total		23	15

Scores and results list the United States' goal tally first.

List of international goals scored by Jesús Ferreira
No.	Date	Venue	Opponent	Score	Result	Competition
1.	January 31, 2021	Exploria Stadium, Orlando, United States	Trinidad and Tobago	2–0	7–0	Friendly
2.	January 31, 2021	Exploria Stadium, Orlando, United States	Trinidad and Tobago	7–0	7–0	Friendly
3.	March 27, 2022	Exploria Stadium, Orlando, United States	Panama	3–0	5–1	2022 FIFA World Cup qualification
4.	June 10, 2022	Q2 Stadium, Austin, United States	Grenada	1–0	5–0	2022–23 CONCACAF Nations League A
5.	June 10, 2022	Q2 Stadium, Austin, United States	Grenada	2–0	5–0	2022–23 CONCACAF Nations League A
6.	June 10, 2022	Q2 Stadium, Austin, United States	Grenada	3–0	5–0	2022–23 CONCACAF Nations League A
7.	June 10, 2022	Q2 Stadium, Austin, United States	Grenada	5–0	5–0	2022–23 CONCACAF Nations League A
8.	April 19, 2023	State Farm Stadium, Glendale, United States	Mexico	1–1	1–1	Friendly
9.	June 28, 2023	CityPark, St. Louis, United States	Saint Kitts and Nevis	3–0	6–0	2023 CONCACAF Gold Cup
10.	June 28, 2023	CityPark, St. Louis, United States	Saint Kitts and Nevis	4–0	6–0	2023 CONCACAF Gold Cup
11.	June 28, 2023	CityPark, St. Louis, United States	Saint Kitts and Nevis	5–0	6–0	2023 CONCACAF Gold Cup
12.	July 2, 2023	Bank of America Stadium, Charlotte, United States	Trinidad and Tobago	1–0	6–0	2023 CONCACAF Gold Cup
13.	July 2, 2023	Bank of America Stadium, Charlotte, United States	Trinidad and Tobago	2–0	6–0	2023 CONCACAF Gold Cup
14.	July 2, 2023	Bank of America Stadium, Charlotte, United States	Trinidad and Tobago	3–0	6–0	2023 CONCACAF Gold Cup
15.	July 12, 2023	Snapdragon Stadium, San Diego, United States	Panama	1–1	1–1 (4–5 p)	2023 CONCACAF Gold Cup

== Honours ==
Seattle Sounders FC

- Leagues Cup: 2025

Individual

- MLS All-Star: 2022, 2023
- MLS Young Player of the Year: 2022
- MLS Best XI: 2022
- CONCACAF Gold Cup Golden Boot: 2023
- CONCACAF Gold Cup Best XI: 2023
