= Caiser Gomes =

Bissau-Guinean association football player

Personal information
- Full name: Caiser Sérgio Gomes
- Date of birth: 4 April 2000 (age 26)
- Place of birth: Bissau, Guinea-Bissau
- Height: 6 ft 0 in (1.84 m)
- Position: Defender

Team information
- Current team: Alverca
- Number: 44

Youth career
- 2010–2015: Central 32
- 2012–2013: Sporting CP
- 2013–2015: Central 32
- 2015–2018: Linda-a-Velha
- 2018–2019: Alverca

Senior career*
| Years | Team | Apps | (Gls) |
| 2019– | Alverca | 24 | (0) |
| 2019–2020 | → Fabril Barreiro (loan) | 14 | (0) |
| 2021 | → North Texas SC (loan) | 21 | (0) |
- * Club domestic league appearances and goals as of 10 June 2024

Caiser Sérgio Gomes (born 4 April 2000) is a Bissau-Guinean professional footballer who plays as a defender for Liga Portugal 2 club Alverca.

== Career ==
=== Alverca ===
Gomes started his professional career with Campeonato de Portugal side Alverca, spending a season on loan with fellow third-tier side Fabril Barreiro in 2018–19.

=== North Texas ===
On 19 April 2021, Gomes joined USL League One side North Texas SC on a season-long loan. He made his debut for the club on 8 May 2021, appearing as a 62nd-minute substitute during a 1–0 loss to Chattanooga Red Wolves.
