= 2019 North Texas SC season =

North Texas SC
2019 season
- Head coach: Eric Quill
- Stadium: Toyota Stadium; Frisco, Texas (Capacity: 20,500)
- USL League One: 1st
- USL League One Playoffs: Champion
- Highest home attendance: 3,512 (April 27 vs. Orlando City B)
- Lowest home attendance: 615 (August 27 vs. Tormenta FC)
- Average home league attendance: 1,367
- Biggest win: 5–0 (vs. Tormenta FC – August 27)
- Biggest defeat: 0–4 (vs. Greenville Triumph SC – July 26)
Home colours	Away colours

The 2019 North Texas SC season was the first season for North Texas SC's existence, and their first in USL League One, the third tier of professional soccer in the United States and Canada.

== Background ==
On November 2, 2018, it was announced by FC Dallas that Dallas would be granted a side to play in the newly created United Soccer League third division for 2019. The club then officially announced the name of the reserve side, North Texas SC, and crest on December 6, 2018.

== Club ==
=== Roster ===
As of March 31, 2019.

No.	Position	Nation	Player
1	GK	MEX	Carlos Avilez
2	DF	USA	Cesar Murillo
3	DF	BEN	Abdul Gaffar Ibrahim (on loan from MFK Vyškov)
4	DF	USA	Brecc Evans (captain,)
5	DF	USA	Hector Montalvo
6	MF	GAM	Alfusainey Jatta (on loan from MFK Vyškov)
7	MF	USA	Oscar Romero
8	MF	USA	David Rodriguez (1)
9	FW	USA	Ricardo Pepi
10	MF	MEX	Arturo Rodriguez
11	FW	HAI	Ronaldo Damus
13	DF	MEX	Nico Carrera
15	MF	USA	Jacori Hayes
18	MF	USA	Brandon Servania
20	GK	USA	Jimmy Maurer
21	MF	HAI	Bicou Bissainthe
22	FW	USA	Ben Redzic
23	MF	USA	Thomas Roberts
25	DF	CAN	Callum Montgomery
26	DF	USA	John Nelson
29	DF	USA	Bryan Reynolds
31	FW	USA	Dante Sealy
33	MF	USA	Edwin Cerrillo
35	GK	USA	Michael Collodi
36	MF	USA	Jorge Almaguer
37	DF	USA	Kevin Bonilla
38	DF	USA	Julian Hinojosa
39	FW	USA	Gibran Rayo
44	FW	USA	Johan Gómez
45	MF	USA	Tanner Tessmann

Signed to first team contract with FC Dallas.
FC Dallas Academy player.

=== Coaching staff ===
Position	Name
Head coach	(United States) Eric Quill
Assistant coach	(Argentina) Alex Aldaz
Assistant coach	(Brazil) Michel

== Non-competitive ==
=== Preseason friendlies ===
February 13, 2019	North Texas SC	1–2	Swope Park Rangers	Frisco, Texas
11:00 CST	Pepi 5'	Report	Mbekeli 47'; Mushagalusa 53'	Stadium: RAV4 Field 4 Attendance: Closed door

March 2, 2019	North Texas SC	5–1	NTX Rayados	Frisco, Texas
18:00 CST	Pepi 30', 54'; Romero 49'; Jatta 53'; Roberts 60'	Report	Okeke 8'	Stadium: Toyota Stadium; Attendance: 14,327; Referee: Travis Haight

March 9, 2019	North Texas SC	3–1	Tulsa Golden Hurricane	Frisco, Texas
5:00 PM CST	Ferreira 10', 21'; Reynolds (yellow card) 33'; Sealy 76'	Report	Habib 66'	Stadium: Toyota Stadium; Attendance: 17,220; Referee: Dustin Cohen

March 23, 2019	North Texas SC	4–0	SMU Mustangs	Frisco, Texas
6:00 PM CDT	Pepi 6', 23'; A. Rodriguez 43'; Jatta (yellow card) 46'; Sesay 88'	Report		Stadium: Toyota Stadium; Attendance: 14,514; Referee: Brandon Gardner

=== Midseason friendlies ===
July 17, 2019	North Texas SC (United States)	1–2	(Spain) Sevilla FC Reserves	Frisco, Texas
CST	Aránguiz 12' (Pepi)	Report	Vidal 30'; Dabour 45+2'	Stadium: Toyota Stadium
Note: 45-minute scrimmage.

== Competitive ==
=== USL League One ===
==== Standings ====
Pos	Team	Pld	W	D	L	GF	GA	GD	Pts	Qualification
1	North Texas SC	28	17	5	6	53	31	+22	56	Playoffs
2	Lansing Ignite FC	28	12	10	6	49	37	+12	46	Playoffs
3	Greenville Triumph SC	28	12	7	9	32	22	+10	43	Playoffs
4	Forward Madison FC	28	12	7	9	33	26	+7	43	Playoffs
5	Chattanooga Red Wolves SC	28	10	10	8	35	37	−2	40	

Source: 2019 USL League One standings
Rules for classification: 1) total wins; 2) total goal differential; 3) total goals scored; 4) points earned against top four Conference finishers; 5) disciplinary points; 6) coin toss or drawing of lots

Round	1	2	3	4	5	6	7	8	9	10	11	12	13	14	15	16	17	18	19	20	21	22	23	24	25	26	27	28
Stadium	H	H	H	A	H	A	H	A	A	A	A	H	H	H	A	H	H	A	H	A	A	H	H	A	H	A	A	A
Result	W	W	W	W	W	D	W	L	W	D	L	W	W	D	W	D	L	L	D	W	L	W	W	W	W	W	L	W
Position	3	2	1	1	1	1	1	1	1	1	1	1	1	1	1	1	1	1	1	1	1	1	1	1	1	1	1	1

Source: USL
A = Away; H = Home; W = Win; D = Draw; L = Loss

==== Results ====
March 30 1	North Texas SC	3–2	Chattanooga Red Wolves SC	Frisco, Texas
6:00 PM CDT	Pepi 13' 62' 77'; Servania (yellow card) 67'	Report	Soto (yellow card) 51'; Dixon (yellow card) 53'; 90+2'; Beattie 84'	Stadium: Toyota Stadium; Attendance: 2,119; Referee: Marco Vega

April 13 2	North Texas SC	1–0	Forward Madison FC	Frisco, Texas
9:20 PM CDT	Romero (yellow card) 7'; Pepi 90+5' (pen.)	Report	Bement (yellow card) 19'; Bartley (yellow card) 90+3'; Coulter (yellow card) 90+5'	Stadium: Toyota Stadium; Attendance: 1,924; Referee: Chris Ruska

April 27 3	North Texas SC	1–0	Orlando City B	Frisco, Texas
5:50 PM CDT	Silva 42' (o.g.); Bissainthe (yellow card) 81'	Report	Léo (yellow card) 90+2'	Stadium: Toyota Stadium; Attendance: 3,512; Referee: Matthew Corrigan

May 4 4	Greenville Triumph SC	0–1	North Texas SC	Greenville, South Carolina
6:00 PM CDT	Moahmed (yellow card) 67'	Report	Roberts 17'; Avilez (yellow card) 64'; Jatta (yellow card) 83'	Stadium: Legacy Early College Field; Attendance: 1,570; Referee: John Griggs

May 11 5	North Texas SC	4–1	Orlando City B	Frisco, Texas
3:20 PM CDT	Gómez (yellow card) 38', (goal) 77'; Tessmann 69'; A. Rodriguez 86' (pen.); Damus 88'	Report	Simas (yellow card) 33'; Bagrou 48'; Simeon (yellow card) 90+5'	Stadium: Toyota Stadium; Attendance: 1,344; Referee: Reyna Fonseca

May 18 6	Lansing Ignite	2–2	North Texas SC	Lansing, Michigan
6:00 PM CDT	Mentzigen 54', (yellow card) 56'; Bruce 65', (red card) 90+5'; Saint-Duc (yellow card) 72'; Stoneman (yellow card) 89'	Report	Tessmann (yellow card) 35'; Jatta (yellow card) 51'; Pepi 83'; A. Rodríguez 87', (yellow card) 90+2'; Almaguer (yellow card) 89'	Stadium: Cooley Law School Stadium; Attendance: 2,149; Referee: Calin Radosav

May 22 7	North Texas SC	3–1	Forward Madison FC	Frisco, Texas
7:00 PM CDT	Damus 3'; D. Rodriguez 7'; Bissainthe (yellow card) 27'; Almaguer 70'; Hinojosa (yellow card) 84'; Rayo (yellow card) 87'	Report	Sylvestre (yellow card) 10'; Smart 15'; Paulo Jr. (yellow card) 42'; Bement (yellow card) 68'	Stadium: Toyota Stadium; Attendance: 1,103; Referee: Adam Kilpatrick

May 29 8	Toronto FC II	3–2	North Texas SC	Toronto, Ontario, Canada
10:00 AM CDT	Bunk-Andersen 12', (yellow card) 45+3'; Srbely 26'; Okello (yellow card) 32'; Mohammed 77'; Silva (yellow card) 90+6'	Report	A. Rodriguez (yellow card) 35'; Pepi 45+2'; Damus 56'; Jatta (yellow card) 87'	Stadium: BMO Training Ground; Attendance: 177; Referee: Alexis Vaughan

June 1 9	Richmond Kickers	0–3	North Texas SC	Richmond, Virginia
6:00 PM CDT	Gallardo (yellow card) 81'; Boateng (yellow card) 88'; Thomsen (yellow card) 90'	Report	Sealy 27', (yellow card) 50'; Jatta (yellow card) 55'; Pepi 63'; D. Rodriguez 68'	Stadium: City Stadium; Attendance: 4,514; Referee: Jasmine Peralta

June 12 10	Toronto FC II	3–3	North Texas SC	Toronto, Ontario, Canada
3:00 PM CDT	Mohammed (yellow card) 10'; Dorsey 44'; West (yellow card) 72'; Srbely 73', (yellow card) 81'; Mingo 90+2'	Report	Damus 9', 26', 27'; Sealy (yellow card) 10'	Stadium: BMO Training Ground; Attendance: 525; Referee: Silviu Petrescu

June 22 11	Forward Madison FC	4–1	North Texas SC	Madison, Wisconsin
7:00 PM CDT	Don Smart 33', 64'; Díaz (yellow card) 49'; Núñez 78'; Banks 84'	Report	Damus 15'; Jatta (yellow card) 64'	Stadium: Breese Stevens Field; Attendance: 4,211; Referee: Luis Arroyo

June 25 12	North Texas SC	1–0	FC Tucson	Frisco, Texas
7:00 PM CDT	Damus (yellow card) 32', (goal) 39'; Roberts (yellow card) 54'; Murillo (yellow card) 60'	Report	Batista (yellow card) 66'; Venter (yellow card) 81'; Cox (yellow card) 84'	Stadium: Toyota Stadium; Attendance: 1,021; Referee: Laura Rodriguez

June 29 13	North Texas SC	3–1	Lansing Ignite FC	Frisco, Texas
7:00 PM CDT	Tessmann (yellow card) 43'; Montgomery 57'; Damus (yellow card) 59', (goal) 73'; A. Rodriguez 71'	Report	Moon (yellow card) 59'; Cleveland (yellow card) 74'; Faz 83'	Stadium: Toyota Stadium; Attendance: 632; Referee: Marco Vega

July 6 14	North Texas SC	0–0	Greenville Triumph SC	Frisco, Texas
7:00 PM CDT	Romero (yellow card) 28'; Escribano (yellow card) 59'	Report	Walker (yellow card) 39'; Gómez (yellow card) 86'	Stadium: Toyota Stadium; Attendance: 720; Referee: Chris Ruska

July 13 15	Richmond Kickers	0–2	North Texas SC	Richmond, Virginia
6:00 PM CDT	Rodriguez (yellow card) 42'; Ackwei (yellow card) 57'; Eckenrode (yellow card) 65' (yellow-red card) 89'	Report	Roberts 11', (yellow card) 81'; Montgomery 14'	Stadium: City Stadium; Attendance: 3,321; Referee: Jonathan Bilinski

July 20 16	North Texas SC	0–0	Tormenta FC	Frisco, Texas
7:00 PM CDT	Cerrillo (yellow card) 70'	Report	Vinyals (red card) 74'; Micaletto (yellow card) 88'	Stadium: Toyota Stadium; Attendance: 1,431; Referee: Samantha Martinez

July 26 17	North Texas SC	0–4	Greenville Triumph SC	Frisco, Texas
7:00 PM CDT	Cerrillo (red card) 20'; Roberts (yellow card) 82'; A. Rodríguez (yellow card) 90+4'	Report	Politz (yellow card) 35'; Gómez (yellow card) 45+3'; Walker 62'; Keegan 64', 70'; Robinson (yellow card) 67', (goal) 88' (pen.)	Stadium: Toyota Stadium; Attendance: 958; Referee: Joseph Salinas

August 3 18	Chattanooga Red Wolves SC	1–0	North Texas SC	Chattanooga, Tennessee
6:00 PM CDT	Beattie 54' (pen.); Folla (yellow card) 57'; Doyle (yellow card) 73'; Ualefi (yellow card) 90+1'; Seoane (yellow card) 90+4'	Report	Bissainthe (yellow card) 40' (yellow-red card) 70'	Stadium: David Stanton Field; Attendance: 1,116; Referee: Jasmine Peralta

August 10 19	North Texas SC	1–1	FC Tucson	Frisco, Texas
9:20 PM CDT	Cerrillo (yellow card) 78'; A. Rodríguez 79'	Report	Jones 45'; Howell (yellow card) 58'	Stadium: Toyota Stadium; Attendance: 2,153; Referee: Brandon Starves

August 17 20	Chattanooga Red Wolves SC	0–2	North Texas SC	Chattanooga, Tennessee
6:00 PM CDT	Doyle (yellow card) 54'; Cisse (yellow card) 87'	Report	Montgomery 35', (yellow card) 42'; Danso (yellow card) 39'; Damus	Stadium: David Stanton Field; Attendance: 1,084; Referee: Eric Tattersall

August 22 21	Lansing Ignite	4–1	North Texas SC	Lansing, Michigan
6:00 PM CDT	Faz 8', 69'; Moon (yellow card) 31'; N'For 50'; Moshobane 71'	Report	Rayo (yellow card) 65'; A. Rodriguez (yellow card) 76'; Romero 86' (pen.)	Stadium: Cooley Law School Stadium; Referee: Luis Arroyo

August 27 22	North Texas SC	5–0	Tormenta FC	Frisco, Texas
7:00 PM CDT	Roberts (yellow card) 17'; Reynolds 29', (yellow card) 85'; Danso 34'; Pepi 45+4' (pen.), 90+1' (pen.); Rayo 82'; Montgomery (yellow card) 89'	Report	Phelps (yellow card) 13'; Dennis (yellow card) 36'; Gómez (yellow card) 38'; Skelton (yellow card) 45+3'; Jackson (yellow card) 79'	Stadium: Toyota Stadium; Attendance: 615; Referee: Joseph Salinas

September 1 23	North Texas SC	2–0	Toronto FC II	Frisco, Texas
7:00 PM CDT	A. Rodriguez 73' (pen.); Damus 83'	Report	Faria (yellow card) 36'; Klenofsky (yellow card) 40'; Endoh (yellow card) 75'; Mohammed (yellow card) 79'; Campbell (yellow card) 85'	Stadium: Toyota Stadium; Attendance: 879; Referee: Karen Callado

September 6 24	Orlando City B	1–3	North Texas SC	Montverde, Florida
6:30 PM CDT	John 53'; Rafael (yellow card) 81'; Ontivero (yellow card) 83'; Léo (yellow card) 89'	Report	Nelson 22'; Damus 54', 70' (pen.); Jatta (yellow card) 57'; Bissainthe (yellow card) 62'; Sealy (yellow card) 75'; Almaguer (yellow card) 90+5'	Stadium: Montverde Academy; Attendance: 171; Referee: Alex Billeter

September 10 25	North Texas SC	4–0	Richmond Kickers	Frisco, Texas
7:00 PM CDT	Damus 1', 30', 77'; A. Rodriguez 70'; Danso (yellow card) 75'	Report	Thomsen (yellow card) 61'; Ackwei (yellow card) 90+1'	Stadium: Toyota Stadium; Attendance: 725; Referee: Samantha Martinez

September 14 26	Tormenta FC	1–2	North Texas SC	Statesboro, Georgia
8:00 PM EDT	Antley 4', (yellow card) 45+3'; Rowe (yellow card) 19'; Micaletto (yellow card) 37'; Phelps (yellow card) 61' (yellow-red card) 72'	Report	Danso 21'; Jatta (yellow card) 43'; A. Rodriguez 45+4'	Stadium: Eagle Field; Attendance: 1,318; Referee: John Griggs

September 22 27	Forward Madison FC	1–0	North Texas SC	Madison, Wisconsin
4:00 PM CDT	Almaguer 24' (o.g.); Díaz (yellow card) 37'; Russell (yellow card) 71'	Report	Cerrillo (yellow card) 29'; Reynolds (yellow card) 41'	Stadium: Breese Stevens Field; Attendance: 4,315; Referee: Adam Kilpatrick

October 4 28	FC Tucson	1–3	North Texas SC	Tucson, Arizona
9:30 PM CDT	Terrón (yellow card) 15'; Hanlin (yellow card) 27'; Jones 42'; Cox (yellow card) 58'	Report	Jones 12' (o.g.); Romero 38', 65'; Avilez (yellow card) 43'; D. Rodriguez (yellow card) 89'	Stadium: Kino North Stadium; Attendance: 678; Referee: Dejan Susak

==== USL League One Playoffs ====
October 12 Semifinals	North Texas SC	2–0	Forward Madison FC	Frisco, Texas
7:00pm (CDT)	Roberts (yellow card) 32'; Cerrillo (yellow card) 36'; Pepi 76', 78'; Jatta (yellow card) 88'	Report	Toyama (yellow card) 8'; Leonard (yellow card) 33'	Stadium: Toyota Stadium; Attendance: 4,067; Referee: Elijio Arreguin

October 19 Final	North Texas SC	1–0	Greenville Triumph SC	Frisco, Texas
6:00pm (CDT)	Jatta (yellow card) 7'; Rodríguez 60'; Damus (yellow card) 90+4'	Report		Stadium: Toyota Stadium; Attendance: 3,245; Referee: Jon Freemon

=== U.S. Open Cup ===
Due to their ownership by a more advanced level professional club (FC Dallas), North Texas SC was one of 13 teams expressly forbidden from entering the Cup competition.

== Statistics ==
#	Pos.	Name	GP	GS	Min.	Goals	Assists	A yellow rectangle, denoting the yellow penalty card shown to a player being cautioned	A red rectangle, denoting the red penalty card shown to a player being sent off
10	MF	Arturo Rodriguez	28	27	2,421	7	10	4	0
6	MF	Alfusainey Jatta	25	21	1,901	0	0	7	0
4	D	Brecc Evans	22	22	1,893	0	0	0	0
36	MF	Jorge Almaguer	23	19	1,820	1	1	2	0
25	D	Callum Montgomery	20	20	1,778	3	0	2	0
11	F	Ronaldo Damus	20	16	1,392	16	3	2	0
37	D	Jose Kevin Bonilla	14	13	1,092	0	1	0	0
9	F	Ricardo Pepi	12	11	1,033	9	1	0	0
8	MF	David Rodriguez	19	13	1,020	2	1	2	0
31	MF	Dante Sealy	19	10	967	1	3	3	0
23	MF	Thomas Roberts	11	11	951	2	0	4	0
29	D	Bryan Reynolds	10	10	900	1	2	2	0
45	MF	Tanner Tessmann	14	9	876	1	0	2	0
7	MF	Oscar Romero	18	9	824	3	2	2	0
14	F	Richard Danso	12	10	812	2	1	2	0
43	D	Jonathan Gomez	8	8	720	0	2	0	0
21	MF	Bicou Bissainthe	16	7	682	0	0	3	1
2	D	Cesar Murillo	12	7	633	0	0	1	0
39	F	Gibran Rayo	12	4	552	1	0	2	0
26	D	John Nelson	6	6	540	1	0	0	0
33	MF	Edwin Cerrillo	6	6	468	0	0	3	1
18	MF	Brandon Servania	4	4	360	0	0	1	0
12	F	Cristian Colmán	6	5	356	0	0	0	0
44	F	Johan Gomez	6	3	319	1	0	1	0
5	D	Héctor Montalvo	5	3	280	0	0	0	0
15	MF	Jacori Hayes	4	4	269	0	0	0	0
28	MF	Michel	1	1	90	0	0	0	0
57	D	Cristian Escribano	1	1	90	0	0	1	0
38	D	Julian Hinojosa	1	0	31	0	1	1	0
13	D	Nicolás Carrera	1	0	23	0	0	0	0
64	F	Jesus Sosa	1	0	11	0	0	0	0
53	F	Michael Sosa	1	0	4	0	0	0	0
40	MF	Cesar Garcia	1	0	1	0	0	0	0
62	MF	Kevin Rosas	1	0	1	0	0	0	0

=== Goalkeepers ===
#	Name	GP	GS	Min.	SV	GA	GAA	SO	A yellow rectangle, denoting the yellow penalty card shown to a player being cautioned	A red rectangle, denoting the red penalty card shown to a player being sent off
1	Carlos Avilez	20	20	1,798	46	25	1.250	9	2	0
20	Jimmy Maurer	4	4	360	14	3	.750	2	0	0
30	Kyle Zobeck	4	4	360	14	3	.750	1	0	0

== See also ==
- 2019 FC Dallas season
