= List of most expensive American soccer transfers =

Most expensive American transfers

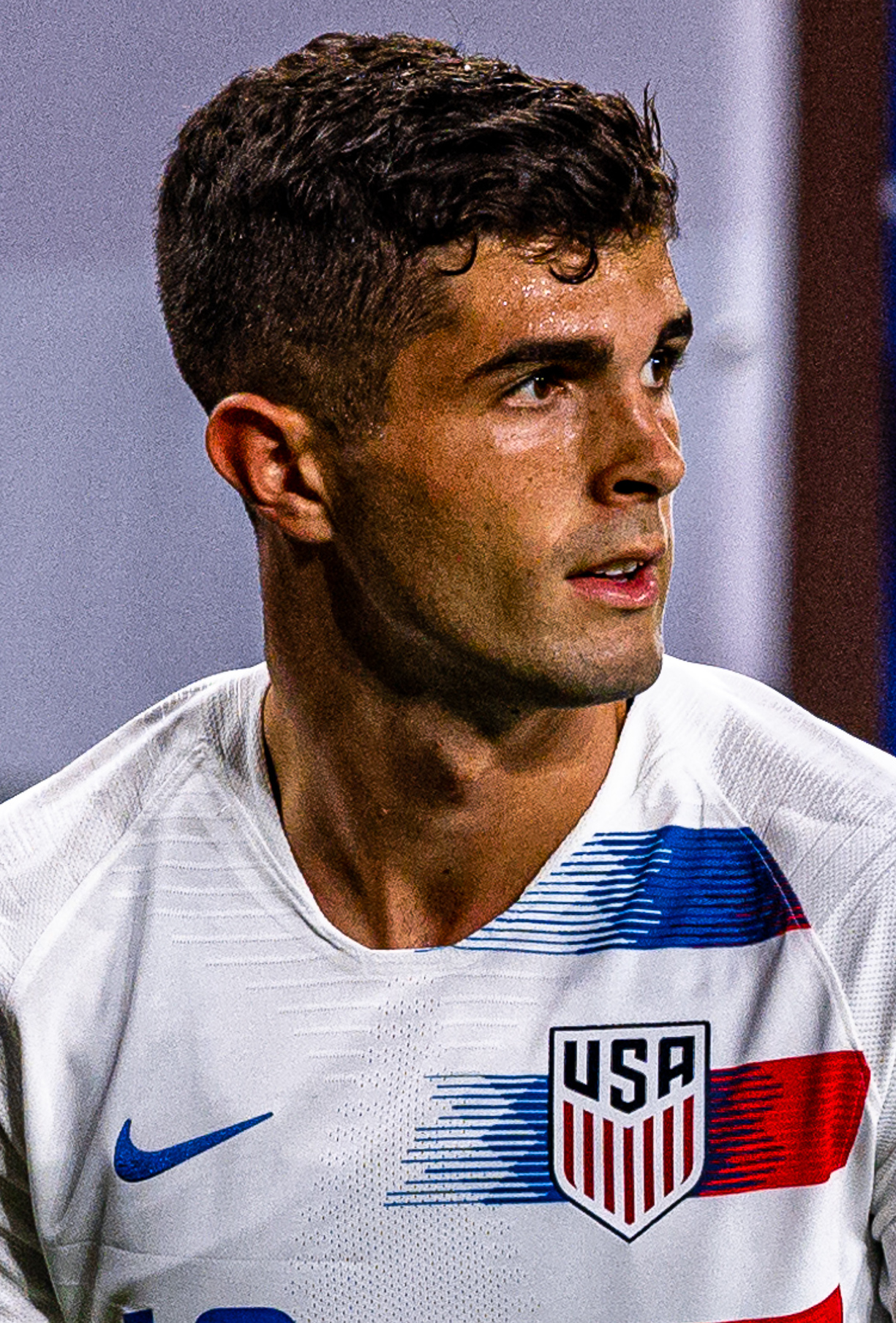
Christian Pulisic, who completed the most expensive transfer ever by an American soccer player.

The following is a list of the most expensive American soccer transfers, which details the highest transfer fees ever paid for American players, as well as the largest transfer fees paid and received by American soccer clubs.

The current transfer record for an American player was set by the transfer of Christian Pulisic from Borussia Dortmund to Chelsea for $65 million in August 2019. The current record transfer fee paid by an American soccer club was set by the transfer of Son Heung-min from Tottenham Hotspur to Los Angeles Football Club for $26.5 million in August 2025. The current record transfer fee received by an American soccer club was set by the transfer of Miguel Almirón from Atlanta United to Newcastle United for $26 million in January 2019.

== Highest transfer payments for American players ==
Rank	Player	From	To	Position	Fee ($)	Year	Ref
1	Christian Pulisic (1)	(Germany) Borussia Dortmund	(England) Chelsea	Forward	$65.0m	2019	
2	Malik Tillman	(Netherlands) PSV	(Germany) Bayer Leverkusen	Midfielder	$46.0m	2025	
3	Folarin Balogun	(England) Arsenal	(France) Monaco	Forward	$43.0m	2023	
4	Johnny Cardoso	(Spain) Real Betis	(Spain) Atlético Madrid	Midfielder	$34.8m	2025	
5	Brenden Aaronson	(Austria) Red Bull Salzburg	(England) Leeds United	Midfielder	$30.2m	2022	
6	Tyler Adams (2)	(England) Leeds United	(England) Bournemouth	Midfielder	$25.5m	2023	
7	Christian Pulisic (2)	(England) Chelsea	(Italy) AC Milan	Forward	$24.2m	2023	
8	Tyler Adams (1)	(Germany) RB Leipzig	(England) Leeds United	Midfielder	$24.1m	2022	
9	Sergiño Dest	(Netherlands) Ajax	(Spain) Barcelona	Defender	$23.1m	2020	
10	Weston McKennie	(Germany) Schalke 04	(Italy) Juventus	Midfielder	$22.5m	2021	
11	Yunus Musah	(Spain) Valencia	(Italy) AC Milan	Midfielder	$20.0m	2023	
12	Ricardo Pepi	(United States) FC Dallas	(Germany) FC Augsburg	Forward	$20.0m	2022	
13	John Brooks	(Germany) Hertha BSC	(Germany) VfL Wolfsburg	Defender	$19.4m	2017	
14	Jozy Altidore (2)	(Netherlands) AZ	(England) Sunderland	Forward	$13.0m	2013	
15	Matt Turner	(England) Arsenal	(England) Nottingham Forest	Goalkeeper	$12.7m	2023	
16	Timothy Weah (2)	(France) Lille	(Italy) Juventus	Defender	$12.4m	2023	
17	Timothy Weah (1)	(France) Paris Saint-Germain	(France) Lille	Defender	$11.4m	2019	
18	Michael Bradley	(Italy) Roma	(Canada) Toronto FC	Midfielder	$10.4m	2014	
19	Jozy Altidore (1)	(United States) New York Red Bulls	(Spain) Villarreal	Striker	$10.0m	2008	
20	Gabriel Slonina	(United States) Chicago Fire	(England) Chelsea	Goalkeeper	$10.0m	2022	

=== Historical progression ===
Year	Player	From	To	Fee ($)	Ref
1990	Tab Ramos	(United States) USSF	(Spain) Figueres	$250,000	
1998	Brad Friedel	(United States) Columbus Crew	(England) Liverpool	$2.1m	
2001	Claudio Reyna	(Scotland) Rangers	(England) Sunderland	$5.9m	
2008	Jozy Altidore	(United States) New York Red Bulls	(Spain) Villarreal	$10.0m	
2013	Jozy Altidore	(Netherlands) AZ	(England) Sunderland	$13.0m	
2017	John Brooks	(Germany) Hertha BSC	(Germany) VfL Wolfsburg	$19.4m	
2019	Christian Pulisic	(Germany) Borussia Dortmund	(England) Chelsea	$65.0m	

== Transfer fees involving American soccer clubs ==
=== Highest transfer payments paid by American soccer clubs ===
Rank	Player	From	To	Position	Fee ($)	Year	Ref
1	(South Korea) Son Heung-min	(England) Tottenham Hotspur	Los Angeles FC	Forward	$26.5 m	2025	
2	(Ivory Coast) Emmanuel Latte Lath	(England) Middlesbrough	Atlanta United	Forward	$22.0m	2025	
3	(Togo) Kévin Denkey	(Belgium) Cercle Brugge	FC Cincinnati	Forward	$16.2m	2024	
4	(Argentina) Thiago Almada	(Argentina) Vélez Sarsfield	Atlanta United	Midfielder	$16.0m	2022	
5	(Argentina) Pity Martínez	(Argentina) River Plate	Atlanta United	Midfielder	$15.5m	2019	
6	(Argentina) Ezequiel Barco	(Argentina) Independiente	Atlanta United	Midfielder	$15.0m	2018	
7	(Brazil) Brenner	(Brazil) São Paulo	FC Cincinnati	Forward	$13.0m	2021	
7	(Russia) Alexey Miranchuk	(Italy) Atalanta	Atlanta United	Forward	$13.0m	2024	
9	(Paraguay) Miguel Almirón	(England) Newcastle United	Atlanta United	Midfielder	$12.5m	2025	
10	(Albania) Myrto Uzuni	(Spain) Granada	Austin FC	Forward	$12.3m	2025	
11	(Mexico) Rodolfo Pizarro	(Mexico) Monterrey	Inter Miami CF	Midfielder	$12.0m	2020	
11	(Belgium) Hugo Cuypers	(Belgium) Gent	Chicago Fire	Forward	$12.0m	2024	
11	(Mexico) Hirving Lozano	(Netherlands) PSV Eindhoven	San Diego FC	Forward	$12.0m	2025	
14	(Brazil) Luiz Araújo	(France) Lille	Atlanta United	Midfielder	$11.0m	2021	
15	(United States) Brandon Vázquez	(Mexico) Monterrey	Austin FC	Forward	$10.0m	2025	
16	(Mexico) Alan Pulido	(Mexico) Guadalajara	Sporting Kansas City	Forward	$9.5m	2020	
17	(Mexico) Javier Hernández	(Spain) Sevilla	LA Galaxy	Forward	$9.4m	2020	
18	(United States) Clint Dempsey	(England) Tottenham Hotspur	Seattle Sounders	Forward	$9.0m	2013	
19	(Uruguay) Brian Rodríguez	(Uruguay) Peñarol	Los Angeles FC	Forward	$8.8m	2019	
20	(Brazil) Talles Magno	(Brazil) Vasco da Gama	New York City FC	Midfielder	$8.2m	2021	

=== Highest transfer payments received by American soccer clubs ===
Rank	Player	From	To	Position	Fee ($)	Year	Ref
1	(Paraguay) Miguel Almirón	Atlanta United	(England) Newcastle United	Midfielder	$26.0m	2019	
2	(Argentina) Thiago Almada	Atlanta United	(Brazil) Botafogo	Midfielder	$22.0m	2024	
3	(United States) Ricardo Pepi	FC Dallas	(Germany) FC Augsburg	Forward	$20.0m	2022	
4	(Colombia) Jhon Durán	Chicago Fire	(England) Aston Villa	Midfielder	$18.7m	2023	
5	(Argentina) Pity Martínez	Atlanta United	(Saudi Arabia) Al Nassr	Midfielder	$18.0m	2020	
5	(Serbia) Đorđe Petrović	New England Revolution	(England) Chelsea	Goalkeeper	$18.0m	2023	
7	(Colombia) Cucho Hernández	Columbus Crew	(Spain) Real Betis	Forward	$16.0m	2025	
8	(United States) Gabriel Slonina	Chicago Fire	(England) Chelsea	Goalkeeper	$15.0m	2022	
9	(Paraguay) Diego Gómez	Inter Miami	(England) Brighton & Hove Albion	Midfielder	$13.8m	2025	
10	(United States) Gianluca Busio	Sporting Kansas City	(Italy) Venezia FC	Midfielder	$10.5m	2021	
11	(United States) Jozy Altidore	New York Red Bulls	(Spain) Villarreal	Forward	$10.0m	2008	
11	(Uruguay) Diego Rossi	Los Angeles FC	(Turkey) Fenerbahçe	Forward	$10.0m	2022	
13	(United States) Daryl Dike	Orlando City	(England) West Bromwich Albion	Forward	$9.5m	2022	
14	(United States) Brenden Aaronson	Philadelphia Union	(Austria) RB Salzburg	Midfielder	$9.0m	2020	
15	(Canada) Tani Oluwaseyi	Minnesota United	(Spain) Villarreal CF	Forward	$8.5m	2025	
16	(United States) Brandon Vázquez	FC Cincinnati	(Mexico) Monterrey	Forward	$7.5m	2024	
16	(United States) Zack Steffen	Columbus Crew	(England) Manchester City	Goalkeeper	$7.5m	2019	
18	(United States) Bryan Reynolds	FC Dallas	(Italy) Roma	Defender	$7.4m	2021	
19	(Canada) Tajon Buchanan	New England Revolution	(Belgium) Club Brugge	Midfielder	$7.0m	2022	
20	(United States) Mark McKenzie	Philadelphia Union	(Belgium) Genk	Defender	$6.0m	2021	

==== Historical progression ====
Year	Player	Selling club	Buying club	Fee ($)	Ref
1990	Tab Ramos	USSF	(Spain) Figueres	250,000	
1998	Brad Friedel	Columbus Crew	(England) Liverpool	2,100,000	
2000	Eddie Lewis	San Jose Earthquakes	(England) Fulham	2,300,000	
2006	Clint Dempsey	New England Revolution	(England) Fulham	4,000,000	
2008	Jozy Altidore	New York Red Bulls	(Spain) Villarreal	10,000,000	
2019	Miguel Almirón	Atlanta United	(England) Newcastle United	26,000,000	
