= 2019 FC Dallas season =

FC Dallas
2019 season
- Owner: Clark Hunt and Dan Hunt
- Head coach: Luchi Gonzalez
- Stadium: Toyota Stadium
- MLS: Conference: 7th Overall: 13th
- MLS Cup playoffs: First round
- U.S. Open Cup: Round of 16
- Top goalscorer: League: Jesús Ferreira (8); All: Jesús Ferreira (8)
- Highest home attendance: 19,096 (July 4 vs. D.C. United)
- Lowest home attendance: 11,911 (June 26 vs. Vancouver Whitecaps FC)
- Average home league attendance: 14,842
- Biggest win: 6–0 (October 6 vs. Sporting Kansas City)
- Biggest defeat: 0–4 (September 14 at Chicago Fire)
| Primary colors | Secondary colors |

The 2019 FC Dallas season was the club's 24th season in Major League Soccer, the top tier of American soccer. FC Dallas also participated in the U.S. Open Cup.

== Transfers ==
=== In ===
| No. | Pos. | Nat. | Name | Age | Moving from | Type | Transfer window | Ends | Transfer fee | Source |
|---|---|---|---|---|---|---|---|---|---|---|
| 13 | FW | (Czech Republic) | Zdeněk Ondrášek | 29 | Wisła Kraków (Poland) | Transfer | Pre-season | Undisclosed | Allocation money | |
| 4 | DF | (Brazil) | Bressan | 25 | Grêmio (Brazil) | Transfer | Pre-season | Undisclosed | Allocation money | |
| 8 | MF | (Honduras) | Bryan Acosta | 25 | CD Tenerife (Spain) | Transfer | Pre-season | Undisclosed | Undisclosed | |
| 26 | DF | (United States) | John Nelson | 21 | UNC-Chapell Hill (United States) | Transfer | Pre-season | Undisclosed | Generation Adidas | |
| 33 | MF | (United States) | Edwin Cerrillo | 18 | FC Dallas Academy (United States) | Transfer | Pre-season | Undisclosed | HGP contract | |
| 25 | DF | (United States) | Callum Montgomery | 21 | UNC-Charlotte (United States) | Transfer | Pre-season | Undisclosed | Signed Draft Pick | |
| 31 | FW | (United States) | Dante Sealy | 15 | FC Dallas Academy (United States) | Transfer | Pre-season | Undisclosed | HGP contract | |
| 16 | FW | (United States) | Ricardo Pepi | 16 | North Texas SC (United States) | Transfer | Mid-season | Undisclosed | HGP contract | |
| 7 | FW | (Ghana) | Edwin Gyasi | 28 | CSKA Sofia (Bulgaria) | Loan | Mid-season | Undisclosed | Allocation money | |
| 6 | MF | (United States) | Eric Alexander | 31 | FC Cincinnati (United States) | Transfer | Mid-season | Undisclosed | Undisclosed | |

==== Draft picks ====
| Round | Selection | Pos. | Name | College | Signed | Source |
|---|---|---|---|---|---|---|
| 1 | 4 | DF | (Canada) Callum Montgomery | Charlotte | Signed | |
| 1 | 10 | DF | (United States) John Nelson | North Carolina | Generation Adidas | |
| 3 | 63 | FW | (United States) Eduvie Ikoba | Dartmouth | Unsigned | |
| 4 | 87 | MF | (United States) Sam Ebstein | California | Unsigned | |
| 4 | 88 | GK | (United States) Dylan Castanheira | Columbia | Not signed, signed with Atlanta United 2 | |

=== Out ===
| No. | Pos. | Nat. | Name | Age | Moving to | Type | Transfer window | Transfer fee | Source |
|---|---|---|---|---|---|---|---|---|---|
| -- | DF | (Ecuador) | Aníbal Chalá | 22 | L.D.U. Quito (Ecuador) | End of loan | Pre-season | Free | |
| 44 | MF | (Colombia) | Abel Aguilar | 33 | Unión Magdalena (Colombia) | Option Declined | Pre-season | Free | |
| 34 | DF | (United States) | Jordan Cano | 22 | none | Option Declined | Pre-season | Free | |
| 31 | DF | (Honduras) | Maynor Figueroa | 35 | Houston Dynamo (United States) | Option Declined | Pre-season | Free | |
| 20 | MF | (Belgium) | Roland Lamah | 30 | FC Cincinnati (United States) | Option Declined | Pre-season | Free | |
| 32 | DF | (United States) | Kris Reaves | 23 | Colorado Springs Switchbacks (United States) | Option Declined | Pre-season | Free | |
| 28 | FW | (Canada) | Adonijah Reid | 19 | Le Havre AC (France) | Option Declined | Pre-season | Free | |
| 13 | FW | (Canada) | Tesho Akindele | 26 | Orlando City SC (United States) | Trade | Pre-season | Allocation money | |
| 37 | FW | (Argentina) | Maximiliano Urruti | 27 | Montreal Impact (Canada) | Trade | Pre-season | 2019 first-round pick and Allocation money | |
| 8 | MF | (Mexico) | Victor Ulloa | 26 | FC Cincinnati (United States) | Trade | Pre-season | Allocation money | |
| 99 | DF | (United States) | Chris Richards | 18 | FC Bayern Munich (Germany) | Transfer | Pre-season | Undisclosed | |
| 6 | DF | (Brazil) | Marquinhos Pedroso | 25 | D.C. United (United States) | Waived | Mid-season | D.C. United 2020 first-round pick | |
| 7 | MF | (Ecuador) | Carlos Gruezo | 24 | FC Augsburg (Germany) | Transfer | Mid-season | Undisclosed | |

== Club ==
=== Roster ===
As of August 9, 2019. Note: Flags indicate national team as defined under FIFA eligibility rules; some limited exceptions apply. Players may hold more than one non-FIFA nationality.

| No. | Pos. | Nation | Player |
|---|---|---|---|
| 1 | GK | USA | Jesse Gonzalez (HGP) |
| 2 | DF | USA | Reggie Cannon (HGP) |
| 3 | DF | SUI | Reto Ziegler |
| 4 | DF | BRA | Bressan |
| 6 | MF | USA | Eric Alexander |
| 7 | FW | GHA | Edwin Gyasi (on loan from CSKA Sofia) |
| 8 | MF | HON | Bryan Acosta (DP) |
| 9 | FW | PAR | Cristian Colmán |
| 11 | MF | COL | Santiago Mosquera (DP) |
| 12 | MF | USA | Ryan Hollingshead |
| 13 | FW | CZE | Zdeněk Ondrášek |
| 14 | FW | SEN | Dominique Badji |
| 15 | MF | USA | Jacori Hayes |

| No. | Pos. | Nation | Player |
|---|---|---|---|
| 16 | FW | USA | Ricardo Pepi (HGP) |
| 18 | MF | USA | Brandon Servania (HGP) |
| 19 | MF | USA | Paxton Pomykal (HGP) |
| 20 | GK | USA | Jimmy Maurer |
| 21 | MF | COL | Michael Barrios |
| 23 | MF | USA | Thomas Roberts (HGP) |
| 24 | DF | USA | Matt Hedges |
| 25 | DF | CAN | Callum Montgomery |
| 26 | DF | USA | John Nelson (GA) |
| 27 | FW | USA | Jesús Ferreira (HGP) |
| 29 | DF | USA | Bryan Reynolds (HGP) |
| 30 | GK | USA | Kyle Zobeck |
| 33 | MF | USA | Edwin Cerrillo (HGP) |

=== Out on loan ===
Note: Flags indicate national team as defined under FIFA eligibility rules; some limited exceptions apply. Players may hold more than one non-FIFA nationality.

| No. | Pos. | Nation | Player |
|---|---|---|---|
| 5 | DF | GUA | Moisés Hernández (on loan to San Antonio FC) |
| 10 | MF | CHI | Pablo Aránguiz (DP) (on loan to Unión Española) |
| 17 | FW | GHA | Francis Atuahene (GA) (on loan to Austin Bold FC) |
| 22 | FW | GHA | Ema Twumasi (GA) (on loan to Austin Bold FC) |
| 31 | FW | USA | Dante Sealy (HGP) (on loan to North Texas SC) |

== Competitions ==
=== Preseason ===
Kickoff times are in CST (UTC−06) unless shown otherwise

| January 30, 2019 | FC Dallas | 5–0 | NTX Rayados | Frisco, Texas |
| 4:00 p.m. CST (UTC−06) | Ondrášek; Hedges; Badji; Cerrillo; Mosquera (pen.) | Report | | Stadium: AdvoCare Field 1 at Toyota Soccer Center |

| February 2, 2019 | FC Dallas | 6–0 | Houston Baptist | Frisco, Texas |
| 10:00 a.m. CST (UTC−06) | Mosquera, Barrios; Aránguiz; Badji, | Report | | Stadium: AdvoCare Field 1 at Toyota Soccer Center |

| February 9, 2019 | FC Dallas | 4–0 | Bayern Munich U-23 | Frisco, Texas |
| 2:00 p.m. CST (UTC−06) | Badji 3'; Hayes 15'; Ziegler 21'; Mosquera 41' | Report | | Stadium: Toyota Stadium; Referee: Rubiel Vazquez |
Note: Split squad doubleheader game #1

| February 9, 2019 | FC Dallas | 1–3 | San Antonio FC | Frisco, Texas |
| 4:00 p.m. CST (UTC−06) | Ondrášek 52' | Report | Forbes 7'; Didic 41'; Wright 82' | Stadium: Toyota Stadium; Referee: Marcos De Oliveira |
Note: Split squad doubleheader game #2

| February 16, 2019 2019 Mobile Mini Sun Cup | Seattle Sounders FC | 1–2 | FC Dallas | Tucson, Arizona |
| 11:00 a.m. CST (UTC−06) | Lodeiro (yellow card) 43'; Abdul-Salaam (yellow card) 65'; Nouhou 90' | Report | Zielger (yellow card) 18'; Gruezo (yellow card) 21'; Badji 34'; Roberts 80'; Acosta (yellow card) 89' | Stadium: Kino Sports Complex |

| February 20, 2019 2019 Mobile Mini Sun Cup | Real Salt Lake | 1–2 | FC Dallas | Tucson, Arizona |
| 2:30 p.m. CST (UTC−06) | Saucedo 22' | Report | Ferreira 56'; Mosquera 58' (pen.) | Stadium: Kino Sports Complex; Referee: Baldomero Toledo |

| February 23, 2019 2019 Mobile Mini Sun Cup | New York Red Bulls | 1–2 | FC Dallas | Tucson, Arizona |
| 12:00 p.m. CST (UTC−06) | Lema 22'; Nuhu (yellow card) 33' | Report | Aránguiz 34' (pen.); Ferreira 77' | Stadium: Kino Sports Complex; Referee: Nima Saghafi |

=== Mid-season exhibitions ===
Kickoff times are in CDT (UTC−05) unless shown otherwise

| July 7, 2019 International Friendly | FC Dallas | 0–0 | Tijuana | Frisco, Texas |
| 6:30 p.m. CDT (UTC−05) | Aránguiz (red card) 45+3'; Atuahene (yellow card) 56'; Servania (yellow card) 73' | Report | Rivero (yellow card) 66'; Nahuelpan (yellow card) 68' | Stadium: Toyota Stadium; Referee: Luis Guardia |

| July 17, 2019 International Friendly | FC Dallas | 1–3 | Sevilla FC | Frisco, Texas |
| 7:00 p.m. CDT (UTC−05) | Mosquera 42'; Cerrillo (yellow card) 59'; Atuahene (yellow card) 90+3' | Report | de Jong 22'; Vázquez (yellow card) 38'; Jordán 52'; Pozo (yellow card) 66'; Nolito 83'; Mesa (yellow card) 90+1' | Stadium: Toyota Stadium; Attendance: 12,248; Referee: Alex Chilowicz |

=== MLS ===
==== Western Conference standings ====
Western Conference

2019 MLS Western Conference standings
| Pos | Team | Pld | W | L | T | GF | GA | GD | Pts | Qualification |
|---|---|---|---|---|---|---|---|---|---|---|
| 5 | LA Galaxy | 34 | 16 | 15 | 3 | 56 | 55 | +1 | 51 | Qualification for the first round |
| 6 | Portland Timbers | 34 | 14 | 13 | 7 | 49 | 48 | +1 | 49 | Qualification for the first round |
| 7 | FC Dallas | 34 | 13 | 12 | 9 | 48 | 46 | +2 | 48 | Qualification for the first round |
| 8 | San Jose Earthquakes | 34 | 13 | 16 | 5 | 51 | 52 | −1 | 44 | |
| 9 | Colorado Rapids | 34 | 12 | 16 | 6 | 57 | 60 | −3 | 42 | |

Source: MLS
Rules for classification: 1) points; 2) total wins; 3) total goal differential; 4) total goals scored; 5) disciplinary points; 6) away goal differential; 7) away goals scored; 8) home goals scored; 9) home goal differential; 10) coin toss or drawing of lots

==== Overall standings ====
2019 MLS regular season standings
| Pos | Team | Pld | W | L | T | GF | GA | GD | Pts |
|---|---|---|---|---|---|---|---|---|---|
| 11 | Portland Timbers | 34 | 14 | 13 | 7 | 52 | 49 | +3 | 49 |
| 12 | New York Red Bulls | 34 | 14 | 14 | 6 | 53 | 51 | +2 | 48 |
| 13 | FC Dallas | 34 | 13 | 12 | 9 | 54 | 46 | +8 | 48 |
| 14 | New England Revolution | 34 | 11 | 11 | 12 | 50 | 57 | −7 | 45 |
| 15 | San Jose Earthquakes | 34 | 13 | 16 | 5 | 52 | 55 | −3 | 44 |

Source: MLS
Rules for classification: 1) points; 2) total wins; 3) total goal differential; 4) total goals scored; 5) disciplinary points; 6) away goals scored; 7) away goal differential; 8) coin toss or drawing of lots

==== Results summary ====
| Overall | | | | | | | | Home | | | | | | Away | | | | | |
| Pld | W | D | L | GF | GA | GD | Pts | W | D | L | GF | GA | GD | W | D | L | GF | GA | GD |
|---|---|---|---|---|---|---|---|---|---|---|---|---|---|---|---|---|---|---|---|
| 34 | 13 | 9 | 12 | 54 | 46 | +8 | 48 | 10 | 6 | 1 | 38 | 16 | +22 | 3 | 3 | 11 | 16 | 30 | −14 |

Last updated: October 6, 2019.
Source: Regular Season

==== Results by round ====
| Round | 1 | 2 | 3 | 4 | 5 | 6 | 7 | 8 | 9 | 10 | 11 | 12 | 13 | 14 | 15 | 16 | 17 | 18 | 19 | 20 | 21 | 22 | 23 | 24 | 25 | 26 | 27 | 28 | 29 | 30 | 31 | 32 | 33 | 34 |
|---|---|---|---|---|---|---|---|---|---|---|---|---|---|---|---|---|---|---|---|---|---|---|---|---|---|---|---|---|---|---|---|---|---|---|
| Stadium | H | H | A | H | A | A | H | A | H | A | H | A | H | A | H | A | H | H | A | H | A | A | H | A | H | A | A | H | H | A | A | H | A | H |
| Result | D | W | L | W | W | L | W | W | D | L | L | L | D | L | W | D | W | D | L | W | L | W | D | L | W | L | D | W | W | L | D | D | L | W |

Updated to match(es) played on October 6, 2019. Source: Regular Season
A = Away; H = Home; W = Win; D = Draw; L = Loss

==== Regular season ====
Kickoff times are in CDT (UTC−05) unless shown otherwise

| March 2, 2019 1 | FC Dallas | 1–1 | New England Revolution | Frisco, Texas |
| 3:30 p.m. CST (UTC−06) | Barrios 13'; Ziegler (yellow card) 56'; Badji (yellow card) 71' | Report | Gil 57'; Zahibo (yellow card) 19'; Mlinar (yellow card) 70' | Stadium: Toyota Stadium; Attendance: 14,327; Referee: Ismail Elfath |

| March 9, 2019 2 | FC Dallas | 2–0 | LA Galaxy | Frisco, Texas |
| 2:30 p.m. CST (UTC−06) | Ziegler 53' (pen.); Acosta 61'; Hedges (yellow card) 63'; Barrios (yellow card) 80' | Report | Feltscher (yellow card) 21'; Lletget (yellow card) 35'; Steres (yellow card) 71'; Polenta (yellow card) 75' dos Santos (yellow card) 90+4' | Stadium: Toyota Stadium; Attendance: 17,220; Referee: Armando Villarreal |

| March 16, 2019 3 Pioneer Cup | Columbus Crew SC | 1–0 | FC Dallas | Columbus, Ohio |
| 1:00 p.m. CDT (UTC−05) | Sauro 10'; Francis (yellow card) 90+2' | Report | Acosta (yellow card) 44' | Stadium: Mapfre Stadium; Attendance: 9,687; Referee: Alex Chilowicz |

| March 23, 2019 4 | FC Dallas | 2–1 | Colorado Rapids | Frisco, Texas |
| 4:45PM CDT (UTC−05) | Barrios 35' (yellow card) 76'; Hollingshead 82'; González (yellow card) 86' | Report | Smith 69'; Price (yellow card) 88' | Stadium: Toyota Stadium; Attendance: 14,514; Referee: Chris Penso |

| March 30, 2019 5 | Real Salt Lake | 2–4 | FC Dallas | Sandy, Utah |
| 8:00 p.m. CDT (UTC−05) | Kreilach (red card) 17'; Savarino 31'; Beckerman (yellow card) 44'; Saucedo (yellow card) 48'; Silva 66' | Report | Gruezo 1'; Pomykal 32', 64'; Cannon (yellow card) 45+1'; González (yellow card) 53'; Ferreira 69' | Stadium: Rio Tinto Stadium; Attendance: 18,220; Referee: Baldomero Toledo |

| April 6, 2019 6 | Philadelphia Union | 2–1 | FC Dallas | Chester, Pennsylvania |
| 6:30 p.m. CDT (UTC−05) | Fabián (yellow card) 9'; Burke 85'; Bedoya 90+2' | Report | Ziegler 10' (yellow card) 85' | Stadium: Talen Energy Stadium; Attendance: 15,844; Referee: Timothy Ford |

| April 13, 2019 7 | FC Dallas | 2–1 | Portland Timbers | Frisco, Texas |
| 7:00 p.m. CDT (UTC−05) | Ferreira 9'; Ziegler 60' (pen.); Pomykal (yellow card) 65' | Report | Chara (yellow card) 51'; Paredes 67' | Stadium: Toyota Stadium; Attendance: 14,376; Referee: Marcos de Oliveira |

| April 20, 2019 8 | Atlanta United FC | 1–2 | FC Dallas | Atlanta, Georgia |
| 3:00 p.m. CDT (UTC−05) | González Pirez (yellow card) 40'; Larentowicz (yellow card) 61'; Martínez 90+7' (pen.) | Report | Ferreira 6'; Hedges (yellow card) 59'; Barrios (yellow card) 63'; González (yellow card) 74'; Acosta 84' (yellow card) 90+7'; Hayes (yellow card) 90+6' | Stadium: Mercedes-Benz Stadium; Attendance: 43,351; Referee: Armando Villarreal |

| April 27, 2019 9 | FC Dallas | 0–0 | San Jose Earthquakes | Frisco, Texas |
| 2:30 p.m. CDT (UTC−05) | Barrios (yellow card) 43' | Report | Godoy (yellow card) 46'; Thompson (yellow card) 90+2' | Stadium: Toyota Stadium; Attendance: 14,087; Referee: Ramy Touchan |

| May 4, 2019 10 Texas Derby | Houston Dynamo | 2–1 | FC Dallas | Houston, Texas |
| 3:00 p.m. CDT (UTC−05) | Manotas 20' (pen.), 58', 58'; García (yellow card) 27'; McNamara (yellow card) 88'; Cabezas (yellow card) 90+6' | Report | González (yellow card) 20'; Barrios (yellow card) 45+4'; Cannon (yellow card) 77'; Cerrillo (yellow card) 81'; Badji 87' | Stadium: BBVA Compass Stadium; Attendance: 16,521; Referee: Alan Kelly |

| May 11, 2019 11 | FC Dallas | 1–3 | New York Red Bulls | Frisco, Texas |
| 1:00 p.m. CDT (UTC−05) | Ferreira 45+2' | Report | Cásseres 12'; Duncan (yellow card) 45+2'; Nealis 58'; White 85' | Stadium: Toyota Stadium; Attendance: 12,263; Referee: Drew Fischer |

| May 16, 2019 12 | Los Angeles FC | 2–0 | FC Dallas | Los Angeles, California |
| 9:00 p.m. CDT (UTC−05) | Vela 39'; Zimmerman (yellow card) 68'; Rossi 83' | Report | Acosta (yellow card) 63' | Stadium: Banc of California Stadium; Attendance: 22,001; Referee: Allen Chapman |

| May 19, 2019 13 | FC Dallas | 1–1 | Los Angeles FC | Frisco, Texas |
| 6:30 p.m. CDT (UTC−05) | Acosta (yellow card) 6'; Hollingshead 29' (yellow card) 82'; Bressan (yellow card) 34'; Ziegler (yellow card) 46'; Hedges (red card) 49' | Report | Nguyen (yellow card) 55'; Miller (yellow card) 59'; Vela 80' (pen.) | Stadium: Toyota Stadium; Attendance: 15,135; Referee: Chris Penso |

| May 25, 2019 14 | Vancouver Whitecaps FC | 2–1 | FC Dallas | Vancouver, British Columbia |
| 6:00 p.m. CDT (UTC−05) | Adnan 30'; Venuto 40'; Felipe (yellow card) 90+2' | Report | Cannon (yellow card) 60'; Badji 85' | Stadium: BC Place; Attendance: 18,309; Referee: Alex Chilowicz |

| June 1, 2019 15 | FC Dallas | 2–1 | Seattle Sounders FC | Frisco, Texas |
| 7:00 p.m. CDT (UTC−05) | Arreaga 33' (o.g.); Smith 38' (o.g.); Acosta (yellow card) 44'; Ferreira (yellow card) 71'; Ondrasek (yellow card) 84'; Gruezo (yellow card) 90+5' | Report | Leerdam (yellow card) 38'; Ruidíaz 65' | Stadium: Toyota Stadium; Attendance: 14,327; Referee: Baldomero Toledo |

| June 8, 2019 16 | San Jose Earthquakes | 2–2 | FC Dallas | San Jose, California |
| 2:30 p.m. CDT (UTC−05) | López (yellow card) 14'; Wondolowski 46'; Eriksson 54' | Report | Badji (yellow card) 13'; Vega 27' (o.g.); Atuahene 65'; Ferreira (yellow card) 90+1' | Stadium: Avaya Stadium; Attendance: 16,841; Referee: Ted Unkel |

| June 22, 2019 17 | FC Dallas | 3–0 | Toronto FC | Frisco, Texas |
| 7:00 p.m. CDT (UTC−05) | Badji 41', 58'; Bressan 51' | Report | | Stadium: Toyota Stadium; Attendance: 13,623; Referee: Kevin Stott |

| June 26, 2019 18 | FC Dallas | 2–2 | Vancouver Whitecaps FC | Frisco, Texas |
| 8:00 p.m. CDT (UTC−05) | Ziegler (yellow card) 44'; Hedges (yellow card) 45+3'; Ferreira 55'; Hollingshead 59'; Cerrillo (yellow card) 85' | Report | Rose (yellow card) 41'; Reyna 81'; Levis (yellow card) 89'; MacMath (yellow card) 89'; Venuto 90+4' (yellow card) 90+4'; Adnan (yellow card) 90+7' | Stadium: Toyota Stadium; Attendance: 11,911; Referee: Silviu Petrescu |

| June 30, 2019 19 | Portland Timbers | 1–0 | FC Dallas | Portland, Oregon |
| 10:00 p.m. CDT (UTC−05) | Fernández 42'; Moreira (yellow card) 88' | Report | Badji (yellow card) 32'; Pomykal (yellow card) 50' | Stadium: Providence Park; Attendance: 25,218; Referee: Allen Chapman |

| July 4, 2019 20 | FC Dallas | 2–0 | D.C. United | Frisco, Texas |
| 8:00 p.m. CDT (UTC−05) | Mosquera 6'; Hedges (yellow card) 22'; Hollingshead (yellow card) 35'; Badji 65' | Report | Rooney (yellow card) 33'; Canouse (yellow card) 46'; Acosta (red card) 73'; Amarikwa (yellow card) 90+7' | Stadium: Toyota Stadium; Attendance: 19,096; Referee: Nima Saghafi |

| July 13, 2019 21 | Minnesota United FC | 1–0 | FC Dallas | Saint Paul, Minnesota |
| 7:00 p.m. CDT (UTC−05) | Gasper (yellow card) 59'; Toye (yellow card) 80', (goal) 90+1' | Report | Servania (yellow card) 35'; Acosta (yellow card) 45+2'; González (yellow card) 90+5' | Stadium: Allianz Field; Attendance: 19,906; Referee: Baldomero Toledo |

| July 20, 2019 22 | Sporting Kansas City | 0–2 | FC Dallas | Kansas City, Kansas |
| 7:30 p.m. CDT (UTC−05) | Croizet (yellow card) 29'; Gutiérrez (yellow card) 43' | Report | Cannon (yellow card) 35'; Badji 37'; Ferreira 57'; Acosta (yellow card) 68' | Stadium: Children's Mercy Park; Attendance: 18,736; Referee: Alan Kelly |

| July 27, 2019 23 | FC Dallas | 0–0 | Real Salt Lake | Frisco, Texas |
| 7:00 p.m. CDT (UTC−05) | Cannon (yellow card) 35'; Acosta (yellow card) 67' | Report | Glad (yellow card) 90+2' | Stadium: Toyota Stadium; Attendance: 14,717; Referee: Ramy Touchan |

| August 3, 2019 24 | Orlando City SC | 2–0 | FC Dallas | Orlando, Florida |
| 6:30 p.m. CDT (UTC−05) | Akindele 13'; Méndez (yellow card) 69'; Ascues 90+2' | Report | Ziegler (yellow card) 20'; Pomykal (yellow card) 39'; Servania (yellow card) 45'; Ferreira (yellow card) 81' | Stadium: Orlando City Stadium; Attendance: 22,479; Referee: Silviu Petrescu |

| August 10, 2019 25 | FC Dallas | 5–3 | Minnesota United FC | Frisco, Texas |
| 7:00 p.m. CDT (UTC−05) | Hollingshead 28'; Mosquera 32'; Cannon 45' (yellow card) 90+6'; Badji (yellow card) 72'; Servania 85', 90+3' | Report | Finlay 11', 41'; Ibarra (yellow card) 48'; Dotson (yellow card) 58' (goal) 73'; Boxall (yellow card) 69'; Toye (red card) 90+6' | Stadium: Toyota Stadium; Attendance: 15,168; Referee: Alex Chilowicz |

| August 14, 2019 26 | LA Galaxy | 2–0 | FC Dallas | Carson, California |
| 9:30 p.m. CDT (UTC−05) | Ibrahimovic 68', 82'; Feltscher (yellow card) 90' | Report | Acosta (yellow card) 90+5' | Stadium: Dignity Health Sports Park; Attendance: 19,653; Referee: Ismail Elfath |

| August 17, 2019 27 | Montreal Impact | 3–3 | FC Dallas | Montreal, Quebec |
| 6:30 p.m. CDT (UTC−05) | Lappalainen 8', 45+1'; Okwonkwo 56' (yellow card) 68'; Raitala (yellow card) 81'; Lovitz (yellow card) 90+3' | Report | Ziegler (yellow card) 35' (goal) 85' (pen.); Acosta (yellow card) 35'; Ondrášek 59'; Hollingshead 90'; Barrios (yellow card) 90+3' | Stadium: Saputo Stadium; Attendance: 17,509; Referee: Ted Unkel |

| August 25, 2019 28 Texas Derby | FC Dallas | 5–1 | Houston Dynamo | Frisco, Texas |
| 7:00 p.m. CDT (UTC−05) | Ziegler 24' (pen.); Badji (yellow card) 28'; Ferreira 29' (yellow card) 33'; Ondrášek 56', 64'; Barrios 90+6' | Report | Elis (yellow card) 15'; Bizama (yellow card) 23'; Rodríguez 80' | Stadium: Toyota Stadium; Attendance: 15,452; Referee: Armando Villarreal |

| August 31, 2019 29 | FC Dallas | 3–1 | FC Cincinnati | Frisco, Texas |
| 7:00 p.m. CDT (UTC−05) | Hollingshead 12'; Hedges (yellow card) 37'; Barrios 49'; Ondrášek 51'; Badji (yellow card) 60'; Cannon (yellow card) 62'; Acosta (yellow card) 85' | Report | Ledesma 64' (pen.) (yellow card) 73'; Gutman (yellow card) 65'; Manneh (red card) 75' | Stadium: Toyota Stadium; Attendance: 15,811; Referee: Guido Gonzales Jr. |

| September 14, 2019 30 Brimstone Cup | Chicago Fire | 4–0 | FC Dallas | Bridgeview, Illinois |
| 2:30 p.m. CDT (UTC−05) | Sapong 7', 29'; Frankowski 16'; Nikolic 39' | Report | Pomykal (yellow card) 5' | Stadium: SeatGeek Stadium; Attendance: 12,847; Referee: Jair Marrufo |

| September 18, 2019 31 | Seattle Sounders FC | 0–0 | FC Dallas | Seattle, Washington |
| 9:30 p.m. CDT (UTC−05) | Arreaga (yellow card) 24' (yellow-red card) 86'; Kee-hee (yellow card) 90+11' | Report | Hollingshead (yellow card) 67' | Stadium: CenturyLink Field; Attendance: 37,722; Referee: Drew Fischer |

| September 22, 2019 32 | FC Dallas | 1–1 | New York City FC | Frisco, Texas |
| 5:00 p.m. CDT (UTC−05) | Ondrášek (yellow card) 45+4' (goal) 66'; Acosta (yellow card) 61' | Report | Castellanos 1'; Parks (yellow card) 13'; Moralez (yellow card) 68'; Chanot (yellow card) 90+4' | Stadium: Toyota Stadium; Attendance: 14,663; Referee: Ismail Elfath |

| September 29, 2019 33 | Colorado Rapids | 3–0 | FC Dallas | Commerce City, Colorado |
| 6:30 p.m. CDT (UTC−05) | Price 10'; Rubio 45+4'; Kamara 72' | Report | | Stadium: Dick's Sporting Goods Park; Attendance: 16,352; Referee: Chris Penso |

| October 6, 2019 34 | FC Dallas | 6–0 | Sporting Kansas City | Frisco, Texas |
| 3:00 p.m. CDT (UTC−05) | Ondrášek 9', 68'; Hedges 12'; Mosquera 51'; Barrios 54'; Ferreira 73' | Report | Németh (yellow card) 57'; Baráth (yellow card) 67'; Medranda (yellow card) 86' | Stadium: Toyota Stadium; Attendance: 15,623; Referee: Alan Kelly |

=== MLS Cup Playoffs ===
| October 19, 2019 First round | Seattle Sounders FC | 4–3 (a.e.t.) | FC Dallas | Seattle, Washington |
| 2:30 p.m. CDT (UTC−05) | Ruidíaz 18'; Morris 22', 74', 113' | Report | Acosta (yellow card) 29' (goal) 82'; Cannon 39' (yellow card) 44'; Hedges 64'; González (yellow card) 88' | Stadium: CenturyLink Field; Attendance: 37,722; Referee: Nima Saghafi |

=== U.S. Open Cup ===
| June 12, 2019 Fourth round | FC Dallas (Texas) | 4–0 | (Oklahoma) OKC Energy FC | Dallas, Texas |
| 7:00 PM CDT | Hedges 11'; Bressan (yellow card) 20'; Barrios 43'; Badji 52'; Ziegler 90' (pen.) | Report | Brown (yellow card) 46'; Ross (yellow card) 55'; Harris (yellow card) 74' | Stadium: Westcott Field; Attendance: 1,296; Referee: Luis Guardia |

| June 19, 2019 Round of 16 | FC Dallas (Texas) | 1–2 | New Mexico United | Dallas, Texas |
| 7:00 PM CDT | Servania 41'; Cerrillo (yellow card) 90+1'; Bressan (yellow card) 90+7' | Report | Frater 45', (yellow card) 59'; Hamilton 64'; Yearwood (yellow card) 68'; Mizell (yellow card) 90+2'; Padilla (yellow card) 90+3' | Stadium: Westcott Field; Attendance: 1,424; Referee: Jon Freemon |

== Statistics ==
=== Appearances ===
Numbers outside parentheses denote appearances as starter.
Numbers in parentheses denote appearances as substitute.
Players with no appearances are not included in the list.

| No. | Pos. | Nat. | Name | MLS | U.S. Open Cup | Total |
| No. | Pos. | Nat. | Name | Apps | Apps | Apps |
|---|---|---|---|---|---|---|
| 1 | GK | USA | Jesse González | 33 | 0 | 33 |
| 2 | DF | USA | Reggie Cannon | 27(2) | 0 | 27(2) |
| 3 | DF | SWI | Reto Ziegler | 33 | (1) | 33(1) |
| 4 | DF | BRA | Bressan | 13(6) | 2 | 15(6) |
| 7 | FW | GHA | Edwin Gyasi | 1(3) | 0 | 1(3) |
| 8 | MF | HON | Bryan Acosta | 24(3) | 0 | 24(3) |
| 11 | FW | COL | Santiago Mosquera | 12(12) | 0 | 12(12) |
| 12 | MF | USA | Ryan Hollingshead | 34(1) | 2 | 36(1) |
| 13 | FW | CZE | Zdeněk Ondrášek | 8(10) | (2) | 8(12) |
| 14 | FW | SEN | Dominique Badji | 24(4) | 2 | 26(4) |
| 15 | MF | USA | Jacori Hayes | 8(12) | 1 | 9(12) |
| 16 | FW | USA | Ricardo Pepi | (7) | 2 | 2(7) |
| 17 | FW | GHA | Francis Atuahene | (1) | 0 | (1) |
| 18 | MF | USA | Brandon Servania | 14(5) | 2 | 16(5) |
| 19 | MF | USA | Paxton Pomykal | 20(6) | (1) | 20(7) |
| 20 | GK | USA | Jimmy Maurer | 2 | 2 | 4 |
| 21 | MF | COL | Michael Barrios | 32(1) | 2 | 34(1) |
| 22 | FW | GHA | Ema Twumasi | (2) | 0 | (2) |
| 23 | MF | USA | Thomas Roberts | 3(3) | (1) | 3(4) |
| 24 | DF | USA | Matt Hedges | 34 | 2 | 36 |
| 26 | DF | USA | John Nelson | 4(5) | 0 | 4(5) |
| 27 | FW | USA | Jesús Ferreira | 30(4) | 2 | 32(4) |
| 29 | DF | USA | Bryan Reynolds | 1(9) | 2 | 3(9) |
| 33 | MF | USA | Edwin Cerrillo | 11(2) | 1(1) | 12(3) |
Player(s) exiting club mid-season that made appearance
| 6 | DF | BRA | Marquinhos Pedroso | 1(1) | 0 | 1(1) |
| 7 | MF | ECU | Carlos Gruezo | 9 | 0 | 9 |
| 10 | MF | CHI | Pablo Aránguiz | 7(4) | 0 | 7(4) |

=== Goals and assists ===
As of final match played October 19, 2019
Player name(s) in italics transferred out mid-season.

| No. | Pos. | Name | MLS | | U.S. Open Cup | | Total | |
| No. | Pos. | Name | Goals | Assists | Goals | Assists | Goals | Assists |
|---|---|---|---|---|---|---|---|---|
| 2 | DF | (United States) Reggie Cannon | 2 | 1 | 0 | 0 | 2 | 1 |
| 3 | DF | (Switzerland) Reto Ziegler | 5 | 1 | 1 | 0 | 6 | 1 |
| 4 | DF | (Brazil) Bressan | 1 | 1 | 0 | 0 | 1 | 1 |
| 7 | MF | (Ecuador) Carlos Gruezo | 1 | 0 | 0 | 0 | 1 | 0 |
| 8 | MF | (Honduras) Bryan Acosta | 3 | 1 | 0 | 0 | 3 | 1 |
| 11 | MF | (Colombia) Santiago Mosquera | 3 | 2 | 0 | 0 | 3 | 2 |
| 12 | DF | (United States) Ryan Hollingshead | 6 | 3 | 0 | 0 | 6 | 3 |
| 13 | FW | (Czech Republic) Zdeněk Ondrášek | 7 | 2 | 0 | 0 | 7 | 2 |
| 14 | FW | (Senegal) Dominique Badji | 6 | 3 | 1 | 0 | 7 | 3 |
| 15 | MF | (United States) Jacori Hayes | 0 | 2 | 0 | 0 | 0 | 2 |
| 16 | FW | (United States) Ricardo Pepi | 0 | 0 | 0 | 1 | 0 | 1 |
| 17 | FW | (Ghana) Francis Atuahene | 1 | 0 | 0 | 0 | 1 | 0 |
| 18 | MF | (United States) Brandon Servania | 2 | 3 | 1 | 0 | 3 | 3 |
| 19 | MF | (United States) Paxton Pomykal | 2 | 5 | 0 | 0 | 2 | 5 |
| 21 | MF | (Colombia) Michael Barrios | 5 | 16 | 1 | 2 | 6 | 18 |
| 24 | DF | (United States) Matt Hedges | 2 | 1 | 1 | 0 | 3 | 1 |
| 27 | FW | (United States) Jesús Ferreira | 8 | 6 | 0 | 1 | 8 | 7 |
| 29 | DF | (United States) Bryan Reynolds | 0 | 1 | 0 | 0 | 0 | 1 |
| 33 | MF | (United States) Edwin Cerrillo | 0 | 1 | 0 | 0 | 0 | 1 |
| | | | 3 | 0 | 0 | 0 | 3 | 0 |
| Total | | | 57 | 49 | 5 | 4 | 62 | 53 |

=== Disciplinary record ===
As of final match played October 19, 2019
Player name(s) in italics transferred out mid-season.

| No. | Pos. | Name | MLS | | U.S. Open Cup | | Total | |
| No. | Pos. | Name | Yellow card | Red card | Yellow card | Red card | Yellow card | Red card |
|---|---|---|---|---|---|---|---|---|
| 1 | GK | (United States) Jesse González | 6 | 0 | 0 | 0 | 6 | 0 |
| 2 | DF | (United States) Reggie Cannon | 8 | 0 | 0 | 0 | 8 | 0 |
| 3 | DF | (Switzerland) Reto Ziegler | 6 | 0 | 0 | 0 | 6 | 0 |
| 4 | DF | (Brazil) Bressan | 1 | 0 | 2 | 0 | 3 | 0 |
| 7 | MF | (Ecuador) Carlos Gruezo | 1 | 0 | 0 | 0 | 1 | 0 |
| 8 | MF | (Honduras) Bryan Acosta | 13 | 0 | 0 | 0 | 13 | 0 |
| 12 | MF | (United States) Ryan Hollingshead | 3 | 0 | 0 | 0 | 3 | 0 |
| 13 | FW | (Czech Republic) Zdeněk Ondrášek | 2 | 0 | 0 | 0 | 2 | 0 |
| 14 | FW | (Senegal) Dominique Badji | 6 | 0 | 0 | 0 | 6 | 0 |
| 15 | MF | (United States) Jacori Hayes | 1 | 0 | 0 | 0 | 1 | 0 |
| 16 | MF | (United States) Paxton Pomykal | 4 | 0 | 0 | 0 | 4 | 0 |
| 18 | MF | (United States) Brandon Servania | 2 | 0 | 0 | 0 | 2 | 0 |
| 21 | MF | (Colombia) Michael Barrios | 6 | 0 | 0 | 0 | 6 | 0 |
| 24 | DF | (United States) Matt Hedges | 5 | 1 | 0 | 0 | 5 | 1 |
| 27 | FW | (United States) Jesús Ferreira | 4 | 0 | 0 | 0 | 4 | 0 |
| 33 | MF | (United States) Edwin Cerrillo | 2 | 0 | 1 | 0 | 3 | 0 |
| Total | | | 70 | 1 | 3 | 0 | 73 | 1 |

=== Goalkeeper stats ===
As of final match played October 19, 2019

| No. | Name | Total | | | | Major League Soccer | | | | U.S. Open Cup | | | |
| No. | Name | MIN | GA | GAA | SV | MIN | GA | GAA | SV | MIN | GA | GAA | SV |
| 1 | (United States) Jesse Gonzalez | 3000 | 46 | 1.38 | 89 | 3000 | 46 | 1.38 | 89 | 0 | 0 | 0 | 0 |
| 20 | (United States) Jimmy Maurer | 360 | 6 | 1.5 | 9 | 180 | 4 | 2 | 8 | 180 | 2 | 1 | 1 |
| | TOTALS | 3360 | 52 | 1.39 | 98 | 3180 | 50 | 1.42 | 97 | 180 | 2 | 1 | 1 |

== Kits ==
| Primary | Secondary | Secondary Alt. | Special |

| Type | Shirt | Shorts | Socks | First appearance / Info |
|---|---|---|---|---|
| Primary | White / Red / Dark Blue sleeves | Red | Dark Blue / Red and White hoops | MLS, March 2, 2019 against New England Revolution |
| Secondary | White | White | White / Blue hoops | MLS, March 16, 2019, against Columbus Crew SC |
| Secondary Alternate | White | Blue | White / Blue hoops | MLS, March 30, 2019, against Real Salt Lake |
| Special | Gray | Gray | Gray / Teal hoops | MLS, April 20, 2019, against Atlanta United FC |

== See also ==
- FC Dallas
- 2019 in American soccer
- 2019 Major League Soccer season
