= Tanner Tessmann =

American soccer player (born 2001)

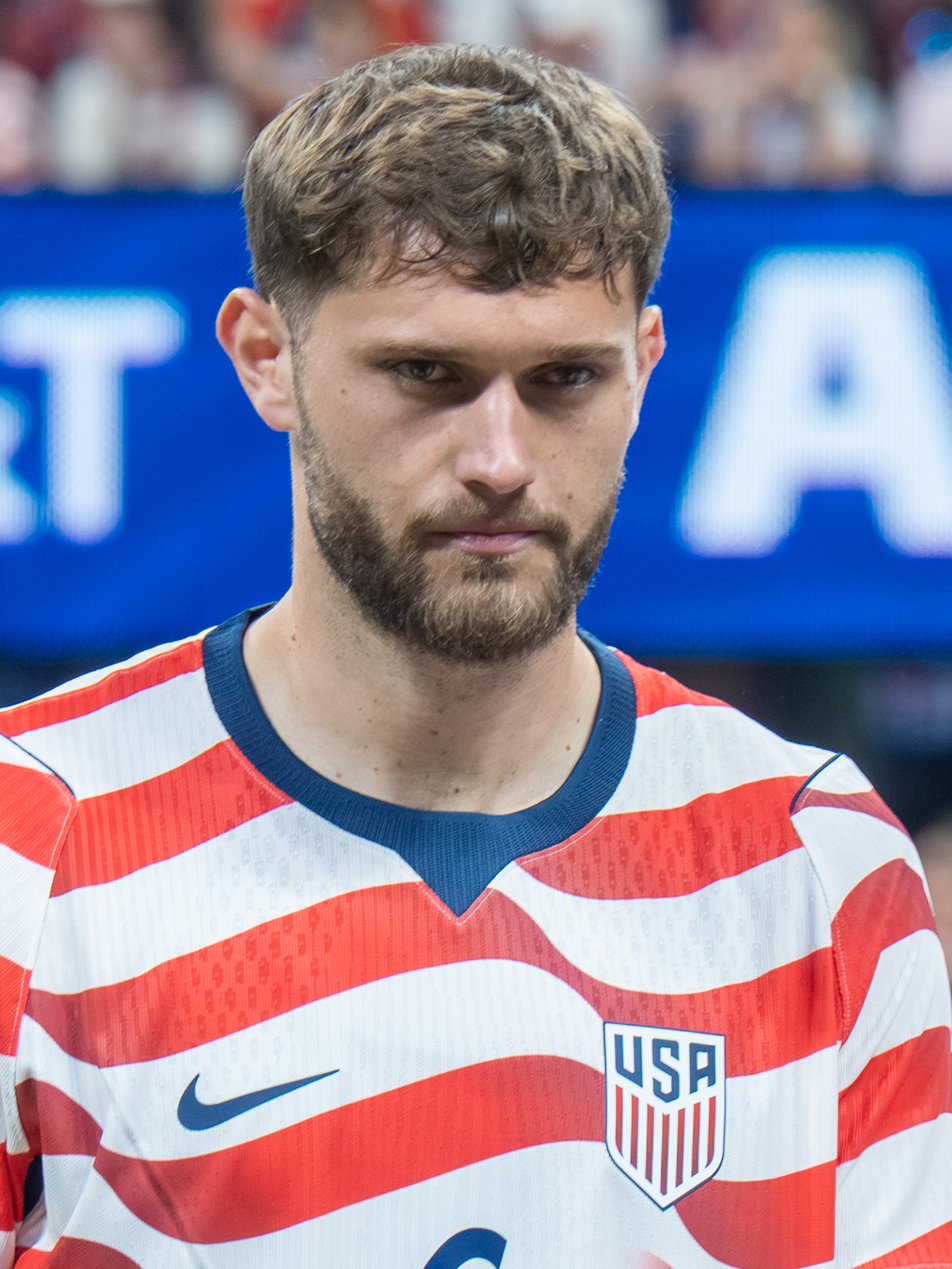
- Tessmann with the United States in 2026

Personal information
- Full name: Francis Tanner James Tessmann
- Date of birth: September 24, 2001 (age 25)
- Place of birth: Birmingham, Alabama, U.S.
- Height: 6 ft 2 in (1.88 m)
- Position: Midfielder

Team information
- Current team: Lyon
- Number: 6

Youth career
- 2016–2019: FC Dallas

Senior career*
Years	Team	Apps	(Gls)
2019	North Texas SC	14	(1)
2020–2021	FC Dallas	26	(0)
2021–2024	Venezia	89	(9)
2024–	Lyon	64	(3)

International career^{‡}
2019	United States U20	1	(0)
2021–2024	United States U23	14	(0)
2021–	United States	14	(1)
- * Club domestic league appearances and goals as of November 21, 2026 ‡ National team caps and goals as of March 31, 2026

Francis Tanner James Tessmann (born September 24, 2001) is an American professional soccer player who plays as a midfielder for Ligue 1 club Lyon and the United States national team.

== Club career ==
=== Academy and reserve ===
Tessmann moved to the FC Dallas academy in 2016 from the BUSA soccer academy in his home state of Alabama. In 2019, while with the Dallas academy, Tessmann also appeared for the club's professional USL League One affiliate team North Texas SC.

=== FC Dallas ===
Following his time with FC Dallas and North Texas SC, Tessmann committed to play both college soccer and college football, as a kicker, at Clemson University. However, on February 27, 2020, Tessmann opted to play professional soccer and signed with Major League Soccer side FC Dallas as a homegrown player.

Tessmann made his Dallas debut on February 29, 2020, starting and tallying an assist in a 2–0 win over Philadelphia Union. Over the course of the 2020 season Tessmann played in 19 matches, starting 9 times and playing a total of 1001 minutes. With FC Dallas having qualified for the 2020 MLS playoffs, he made his postseason debut in the first round and successfully converted a penalty in a shootout victory against the Portland Timbers. He made his first postseason start in the next round, a 1–0 loss to Seattle Sounders FC.

In 2021 he continued to gain first team experiences, starting 6 of the first 12 matches for FC Dallas and playing a total of 452 minutes across 7 appearances.

=== Venezia ===
On July 15, 2021, Tessmann signed for newly promoted Serie A side Venezia.

=== Lyon ===
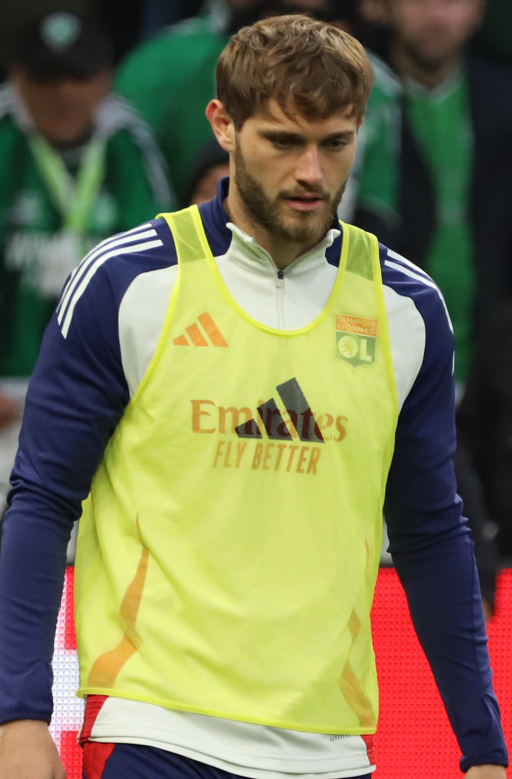
Tessmann with Lyon in 2025.

On August 27, 2024, Tessmann joined French club Lyon.

== International career ==
In January 2021, Tessmann was called up to the senior national team. He made his debut in a 7–0 win against Trinidad and Tobago. Following that game, Tessmann was named to the United States under-23 team for the 2020 CONCACAF Men's Olympic Qualifying Championship after Ulysses Llanez dropped out with an injury. They would fail to qualify for the Olympics.

On October 8, 2023, Tessman was called up to the United States men's national under-23 soccer team ahead of friendlies against Mexico and Japan.

== Personal life ==
Tessmann is the godson of American football head coach Dabo Swinney.

== Career statistics ==
=== Club ===
As of match played November 21, 2026

Appearances and goals by club, season and competition
Club	Season	League			National cup (Note: Includes Coppa Italia, Coupe de France)		Continental		Other		Total	
Club	Season	Division	Apps	Goals	Apps	Goals	Apps	Goals	Apps	Goals	Apps	Goals
North Texas SC	2019	USL League One	14	1	—		—		2 (Note: Appearances in USL League One Playoffs)	0	16	1
FC Dallas	2020	MLS	19	0	—		—		2 (Note: Appearances in MLS Cup Playoffs)	0	21	0
FC Dallas	2021	MLS	7	0	—		—		—		7	0
FC Dallas	Total		26	0	—		—		2	0	28	0
Venezia	2021–22	Serie A	20	0	3	0	—		—		23	0
Venezia	2022–23	Serie B	32	3	1	0	—		1 (Note: Appearance(s) in Serie B promotion play-offs)	0	34	3
Venezia	2023–24	Serie B	37	6	1	0	—		4	1	42	7
Venezia	Total		89	9	5	0	—		5	1	99	10
Lyon	2024–25	Ligue 1	25	1	1	0	9 (Note: Appearances in UEFA Europa League)	0	—		35	1
Lyon	2025–26	Ligue 1	29	1	3	0	9	1	—		41	2
Lyon	2026–27	Ligue 1	10	1	0	0	8 (Note: Four Appearances in UEFA Champions League, four appearances in UEFA Europa League)	0	—		18	1
Lyon	Total		64	3	4	0	26	1	—		94	4
Career total			193	13	9	0	26	1	9	1	237	15

=== International ===
As of match played March 31, 2026

Appearances and goals by national team and year
National team	Year	Apps	Goals
United States	2021	1	0
United States	2022	0	0
United States	2023	1	0
United States	2024	4	0
United States	2025	6	1
United States	2026	2	0
Total		14	1

Scores and results list United States goal tally first.

List of international goals scored by Tanner Tessmann
No.	Date	Venue	Cap	Opponent	Score	Result	Competition
1	November 18, 2025	Raymond James Stadium, Tampa, United States	12	Uruguay	5–1	5–1	Friendly

== Honors ==
Individual

- U.S. Soccer Young Male Player of the Year: 2024
