= Brandon Servania =

American soccer player (born 1999)

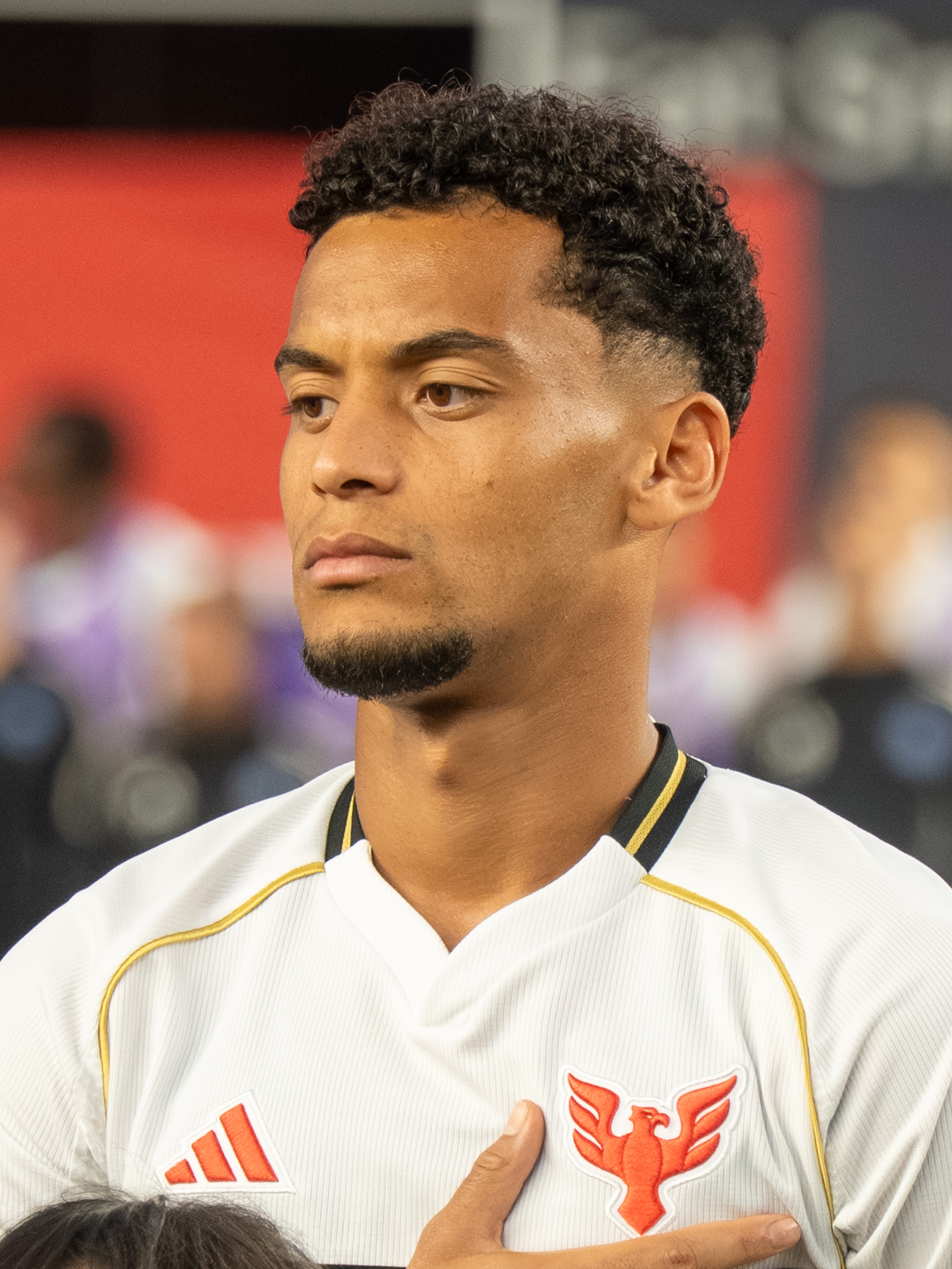
- Servania with D.C. United in 2025

Personal information
- Full name: Brandon Iván Servania
- Date of birth: March 12, 1999 (age 27)
- Place of birth: Birmingham, Alabama, U.S.
- Height: 5 ft 10 in (1.78 m)
- Position: Midfielder

Team information
- Current team: D.C. United
- Number: 23

Youth career
- Birmingham United SC
- Vestavia Hills SC
- 2015–2017: FC Dallas

College career
Years	Team	Apps	(Gls)
2017	Wake Forest Demon Deacons	20	(3)

Senior career*
Years	Team	Apps	(Gls)
2018–2022	FC Dallas	67	(4)
2018	→ Tulsa Roughnecks (loan)	16	(0)
2019	→ North Texas SC (loan)	4	(0)
2021	→ St. Pölten (loan)	10	(0)
2023–2024	Toronto FC	31	(1)
2024	→ Toronto FC II (loan)	2	(0)
2025–	D.C. United	30	(0)

International career^{‡}
2017	United States U18	6	(0)
2018–2019	United States U20	13	(3)
2019	United States U23	1	(0)
2020	United States	1	(0)
- * Club domestic league appearances and goals as of October 25, 2025 ‡ National team caps and goals as of August 11, 2020

Brandon Iván Servania (born March 12, 1999) is an American professional soccer player who plays as a midfielder for D.C. United in Major League Soccer.

== Career ==
=== College ===
Servania played one year of college soccer at Wake Forest University in 2017, making 20 appearances, scoring 3 goals and tallying 11 assists. He was also named in the ACC All-Freshman Team.

=== Professional ===
Following his freshman year in college, Servania opted to sign a homegrown player contract with FC Dallas on January 3, 2018. On May 18, 2018, Servania joined United Soccer League side Tulsa Roughnecks on loan.

On January 5, 2021, Servania was one of six FC Dallas players who went on a three-week training stint with German Bundesliga side Bayern Munich. On February 9, 2021, he moved on loan to Austrian Bundesliga side St. Pölten.

In February 2023, he was traded to Toronto FC in exchange for Jesús Jiménez.

In February 2025, he signed a two-year contract with D.C. United with an option for 2027.

=== International ===
On October 23, 2018, Servania was called by coach Tab Ramos to be part of the 20-player roster representing United States U20 at the 2018 CONCACAF U-20 Championship. During the U-20 final against Mexico, Brandon cleared a shot off the line to preserve the 2–0 United States victory.

Servania received his first call-up to the senior United States team in January 2020, and his first cap in a victory over Costa Rica.

In mid-December 2020, Servania was called up by Puerto Rico at senior level for a training camp in the Dominican Republic from January 10 to 20, 2021. Servania declined the Puerto Rico invitation.

== Personal life ==
Growing up in Alabama, Servania started to play soccer at age six. He kicked off his youth career with Birmingham United Soccer Club from U-11 to U-14 before playing for Vestavia Hills Soccer Club in Alabama.

Servania has a younger brother, Jaden, who plays for North Carolina FC in USL League One. Despite being born in Birmingham, Alabama (like Brandon) Jaden represents Puerto Rico at the international level. Jaden was called to represent Puerto Rico at the 2018 CONCACAF U-20 Championship and Brandon was called to represent the United States in same tournament. On November 1, 2018, Brandon faced his brother when United States debuted in 2018 CONCACAF U-20 Championship against Puerto Rico. Both players played the entire match, Brandon in the midfield and Jaden in the attack.

== Career statistics ==
=== Club ===
As of match played October 19, 2025

Appearances and goals by club, season and competition
Club	Season	League			Playoffs		National cup (Note: Includes U.S. Open Cup and Canadian Championship)		Continental		Other		Total	
Club	Season	Division	Apps	Goals	Apps	Goals	Apps	Goals	Apps	Goals	Apps	Goals	Apps	Goals
FC Dallas	2019	Major League Soccer	18	2	1	0	2	1	—		—		21	3
FC Dallas	2020	Major League Soccer	12	0	0	0	—		—		—		12	0
FC Dallas	2021	Major League Soccer	14	0	—		—		—		—		14	0
FC Dallas	2022	Major League Soccer	23	2	2	0	3	0	—		—		28	2
FC Dallas	Total		67	4	3	0	5	1	0	0	0	0	75	5
Tulsa Roughnecks (loan)	2018	USL Championship	16	0	—		0	0	—		—		16	0
North Texas SC (loan)	2019	USL League One	4	0	0	0	—		—		—		4	0
St. Pölten (loan)	2020–21	Austrian Bundesliga	10	0	—		0	0	—		1 (Note: Appearance in Austrian Bundesliga relegation play-offs)	0	11	0
Toronto FC	2023	Major League Soccer	28	1	—		1	0	—		2 (Note: Appearances in Leagues Cup)	0	31	1
Toronto FC	2024	Major League Soccer	3	0	—		0	0	—		0	0	3	0
Toronto FC	Total		31	1	0	0	1	0	0	0	2	0	34	1
Toronto FC II (loan)	2024	MLS Next Pro	2	0	—		—		—		—		2	0
D.C. United	2025	Major League Soccer	30	0	—		3	0	—		0	0	33	0
Career total			160	5	3	0	9	1	0	0	3	0	175	6

== Honors ==
North Texas SC

- USL League One Regular Season Title: 2019
- USL League One Championship: 2019

United States U20

- CONCACAF U-20 Championship: 2018

Individual

- CONCACAF Under-20 Championship Best XI: 2018
