= John Nelson (soccer, born 1998) =

American soccer player (born 1998)

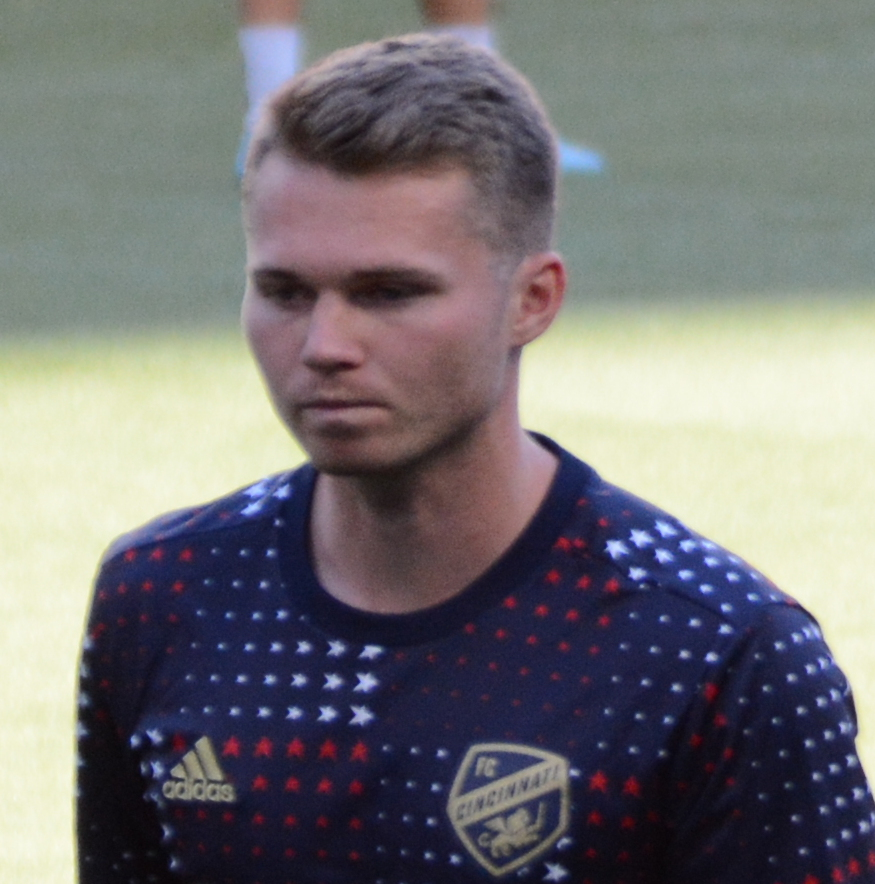
- Nelson with FC Cincinnati in 2022

Personal information
- Full name: John Vincent Nelson
- Date of birth: July 11, 1998 (age 28)
- Place of birth: Medina, Ohio, United States
- Height: 5 ft 9 in (1.75 m)
- Position: Defender

Team information
- Current team: LA Galaxy
- Number: 14

Youth career
- Internationals SC

College career
Years	Team	Apps	(Gls)
2017–2018	North Carolina Tar Heels	41	(1)

Senior career*
Years	Team	Apps	(Gls)
2017	North Carolina FC U23	1	(0)
2018	Tobacco Road FC	5	(1)
2019–2021	FC Dallas	30	(0)
2019	→ North Texas SC	6	(1)
2022	FC Cincinnati	24	(0)
2023	St. Louis City	17	(0)
2024–	LA Galaxy	23	(0)

International career^{‡}
2013	United States U15	2	(0)
2013–2015	United States U17	18	(0)
2016	United States U19	7	(0)
2016–2017	United States U20	3	(0)
- * Club domestic league appearances and goals as of November 25, 2024 ‡ National team caps and goals as of November 11, 2022

John Vincent Nelson (born July 11, 1998) is an American professional soccer player who plays as a defender for Major League Soccer club LA Galaxy.

== Career ==
=== Youth and college ===
John grew up in Medina, Ohio. In 2010, he joined Internationals SC, as a member of the U.S. Soccer Development Academy, in which he was a member of until 2017. While a graduate of Medina High School, Nelson did not play for the school's boys' soccer team. Upon graduating high school, Nelson attended the University of North Carolina at Chapel Hill, where he played college soccer for two years between 2017 and 2018, making 41 appearances, scoring 1 goal and tallying 3 assists.

While in college, Nelson played in the PDL with North Carolina FC U23 and Tobacco Road FC.

Nelson opted to leave college early and signed a Generation Adidas contract with MLS ahead of the 2019 MLS SuperDraft.

=== Professional career ===
On January 11, 2019, Nelson was drafted 10th overall in the 2019 MLS SuperDraft, by FC Dallas. Following the 2021 season, Nelson's contract option was declined by Dallas.

Nelson officially signed with FC Cincinnati on January 6, 2022, after having his rights acquired by Cincinnati in Stage 2 of the 2021 MLS Re-Entry Draft in December 2021.

Nelson was selected by St. Louis City SC in the 2022 MLS Expansion draft for the club’s inaugural season in 2023. Nelson left the club in November 2023 at the end of his contract.

Nelson signed with LA Galaxy on December 21, 2023 to a two year contract with a club option for the 2026 season.

== Career statistics ==
=== Club ===
As of match played December 2, 2020

Appearances and goals by club, season and competition
Club	Season	League			National cup		Other		Total		
Club	Season	Division	Apps	Goals	Apps	Goals	Apps	Goals	Apps	Goals	
FC Dallas	2019	MLS	9	0	0	0	0	0	9	0	
FC Dallas	2020	MLS	11	0	—		2 (Note: Appearances in MLS Cup Playoffs)	0	13	0	
FC Dallas	Total		20	0	0	0	2	0	22	0	
North Texas SC (loan)	2019	USL	7	1	—		—		7	1	
Total		7	1	0	0	0	0	7	1		
Career total				27	1	0	0	2	0	29	1

== Honors ==
St. Louis City SC

- Western Conference (regular season): 2023

LA Galaxy

- MLS Cup: 2024
