= Ricardo Pepi =

American soccer player

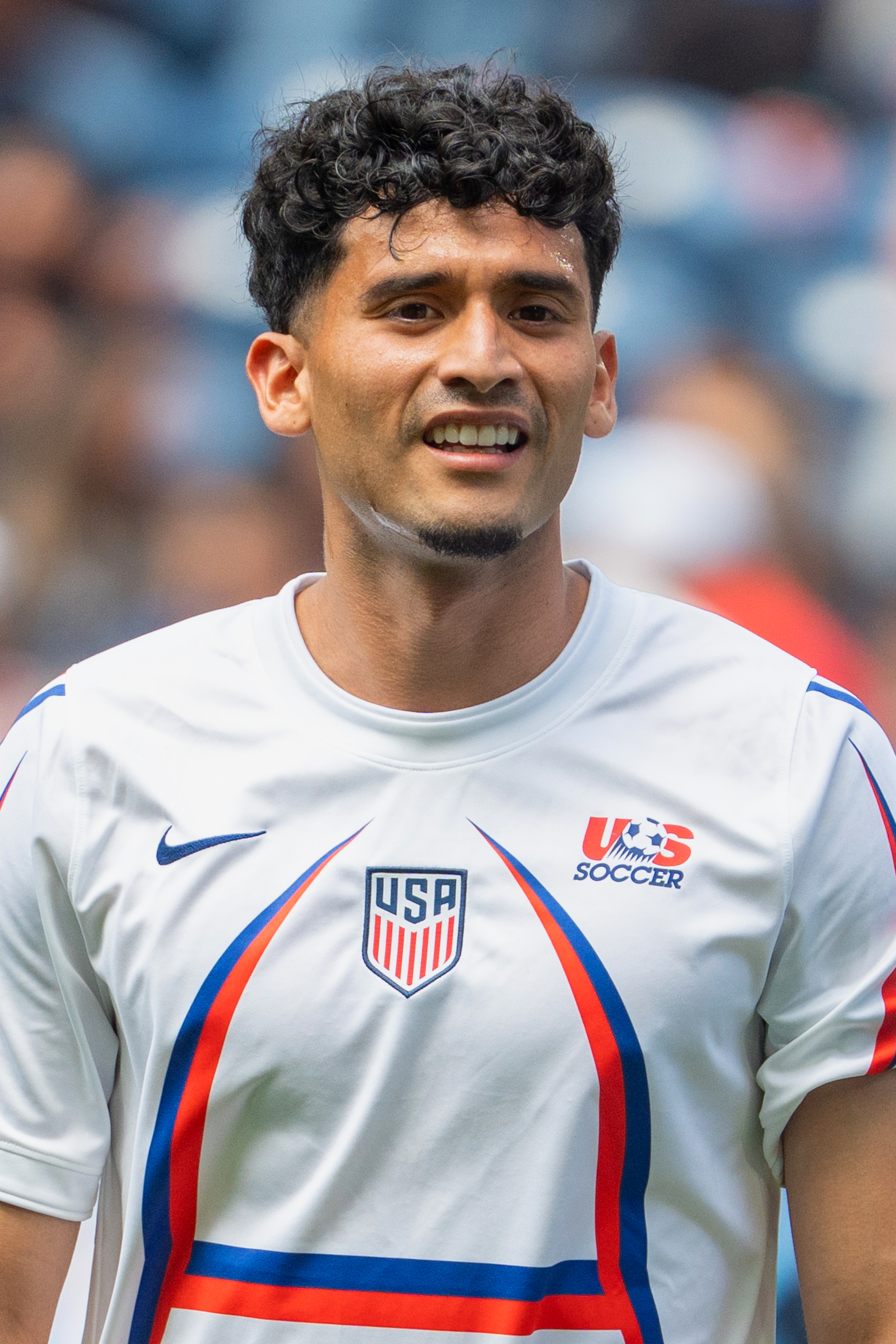
- Pepi with the United States in 2026

Personal information
- Full name: Ricardo Daniel Pepi
- Date of birth: January 9, 2003 (age 23)
- Place of birth: El Paso, Texas, U.S.
- Height: 6 ft 1 in (1.85 m)
- Position: Striker

Team information
- Current team: PSV
- Number: 9

Youth career
- 2016–2019: FC Dallas

Senior career*
Years	Team	Apps	(Gls)
2019–2021	FC Dallas	55	(15)
2019–2020	North Texas SC	13	(9)
2022–2023	FC Augsburg	15	(0)
2022–2023	→ Groningen (loan)	29	(12)
2023–2024	Jong PSV	2	(1)
2023–	PSV	79	(38)

International career^{‡}
2018–2019	United States U17	17	(6)
2021–	United States	42	(13)
Medal record
Representing United States
Men's football
CONCACAF Nations League
Winner	2023 United States
Winner	2024 United States
- * Club domestic league appearances and goals as of 20:45, October 31, 2026 ‡ National team caps and goals as of July 6, 2026

Ricardo Daniel Pepi (born January 9, 2003) is an American professional soccer player who plays as a striker for Eredivisie club PSV and the United States national team.

Pepi had his breakthrough with Major League Soccer club FC Dallas and was named the MLS Young Player of the Year in 2021. In 2022 he joined Bundesliga club Augsburg and was later loaned to Eredivisie club Groningen. In 2023 he signed with PSV Eindhoven for €9 million ($9.8m) and won the 2023–24 Eredivisie.

He represented the United States at the youth U17 level. He made his senior debut in 2021 and won the CONCACAF Nations League in 2023 and 2024. He won the U.S. Soccer Young Male Player of the Year award in 2021.

== Early life ==
Pepi was born in El Paso, Texas, and raised in nearby San Elizario, Texas. He is of Mexican descent, and he regularly travels to Ciudad Juárez to visit family. Pepi began playing recreational soccer when he was only four years old in local El Paso leagues. He soon began playing competitive organized soccer for a club coached by his father, Daniel Pepi. The club would soon become affiliated with Major League Soccer club FC Dallas, who scouted Pepi following the Copa Chivas tournament in 2016, offering the then 13-year old the opportunity to join the FC Dallas youth academy.

In his first season, Pepi was put into the under-13 side and scored 18 goals in just 15 games, leading him to rise up the ranks within the club. He was soon promoted to the under-17 side as a 15-year old, scoring 19 goals in eight matches.

== Club career ==
=== North Texas SC ===
On December 8, 2018, Pepi became the first signing for North Texas SC, the new affiliate club for FC Dallas in USL League One. On March 30, 2019, he made his professional debut in North Texas SC's first ever match, scoring a hat-trick in a 3–2 victory over the Chattanooga Red Wolves. Following the match, North Texas SC head coach Eric Quill stated: "I'd like to say that it shocks me, but it doesn't shock me. He's been in unbelievable form in the preseason. Every game, he's growing. He's got such a hunger to score goals, that is rare. He can finish in any way."

In the following match against Forward Madison, Pepi scored for the second match in a row deep into second half stoppage time to give North Texas SC the 1–0 home victory. He was then called into the international under-17 squad. When he returned, Pepi scored again in his third game of the season against Lansing Ignite in a 2–2 draw.

On October 12, 2019, Pepi returned to North Texas SC for the semifinals of the USL League One playoffs. He scored a brace for North Texas SC against Forward Madison in a 2–0 home victory, advancing the side to the final. After the match, Pepi was called into the under-17 side, thus not being available for selection against Greenville Triumph in the final on October 19. Despite his absence, North Texas SC proceeded to win the match 1–0 through Arturo Rodríguez, thus winning their first championship and giving Pepi his first trophy. Pepi was named as a finalist for the USL Young Player of the Year on October 17, but lost out to Arturo Rodríguez.

=== FC Dallas ===
On June 11, 2019, Pepi was loaned to North Texas SC parent club FC Dallas on a short-term loan ahead of their U.S. Open Cup match against OKC Energy. The next day, Pepi made his competitive debut for FC Dallas against OKC Energy, starting in the 4–0 victory at Toyota Stadium. He appeared again for FC Dallas in the next round on June 19, starting in the 2–1 defeat.

On June 21, 2019, Pepi was signed by FC Dallas to a homegrown player deal, becoming the club's fourth youngest academy signing at 16 years and 163 days old. The next day, on June 22, Pepi made his Major League Soccer debut, coming on as an 84th-minute substitute in a 3–0 home victory over Toronto FC. He finished his first season with FC Dallas with nine appearances and 0 goals.

On March 7, 2020, Pepi scored his first professional goal for FC Dallas, a 96th-minute equalizer in a 2–2 draw against the Montreal Impact. He scored his second goal of the season on September 9 in a 3–2 defeat away against Minnesota United. On November 22, Pepi scored an equalizer for FC Dallas after trailing 1–0 in second-half stoppage time in the first round of the 2020 MLS Cup Playoffs against the Portland Timbers. The match would eventually be decided in a penalty shootout, with Pepi converting his penalty in the lead up to FC Dallas advancing 8–7.

==== 2021 season ====
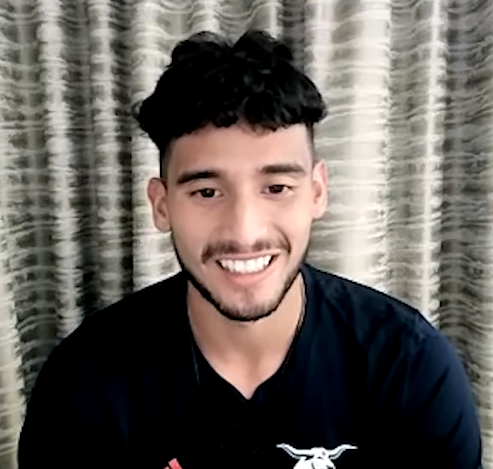
Pepi in 2021.

On April 17, Pepi made his first appearance of the 2021 season against the Colorado Rapids, coming on as an 81st-minute substitute in the 0–0 draw. In the next match on April 24, Pepi scored his first goal of the season, a consolation for FC Dallas in a 3–1 away defeat against the San Jose Earthquakes. From that match on, Pepi would continue to feature as a regular starter for Luchi Gonzalez and on June 19, Pepi scored his second goal of the season against Minnesota United. His goal was an equalizer in a 1–1 draw. He then scored both goals for FC Dallas in a 2–1 victory against the New England Revolution on June 27.

On July 24, Pepi scored his first professional hat-trick in a 4–0 home victory against the LA Galaxy. The three goals in a single match made him the youngest player in Major League Soccer history to score a hat-trick. A week later, on August 4, it was announced that Pepi was selected by Bob Bradley to participate in the 2021 MLS All-Star Game against the Liga MX All-Stars. During the match on August 25, Pepi came on as a halftime substitute as the match ended 1–1 in regulation time, going into a penalty shootout. During the shootout, Pepi scored the winning goal for the Major League Soccer All-Stars to give the league a 3–2 victory.

In his next match, on August 29 against Austin FC, Pepi scored two goals for FC Dallas in a 5–3 away victory. He scored 13 goals in 31 appearances during the 2021 regular season and was named MLS Young Player of the Year.

=== FC Augsburg ===
On January 3, 2022, it was announced that Pepi had signed with FC Augsburg of the Bundesliga. The transfer fee was reported to be $20 million plus add-ons. The move made him the most expensive American MLS player to sign for a European club, the most expensive transfer by Augsburg, and the second most expensive player to transfer from MLS to a European league. He made his league debut for Augsburg on January 8, coming on in the 60th minute in a 3–1 defeat to Hoffenheim.

==== Loan to FC Groningen ====
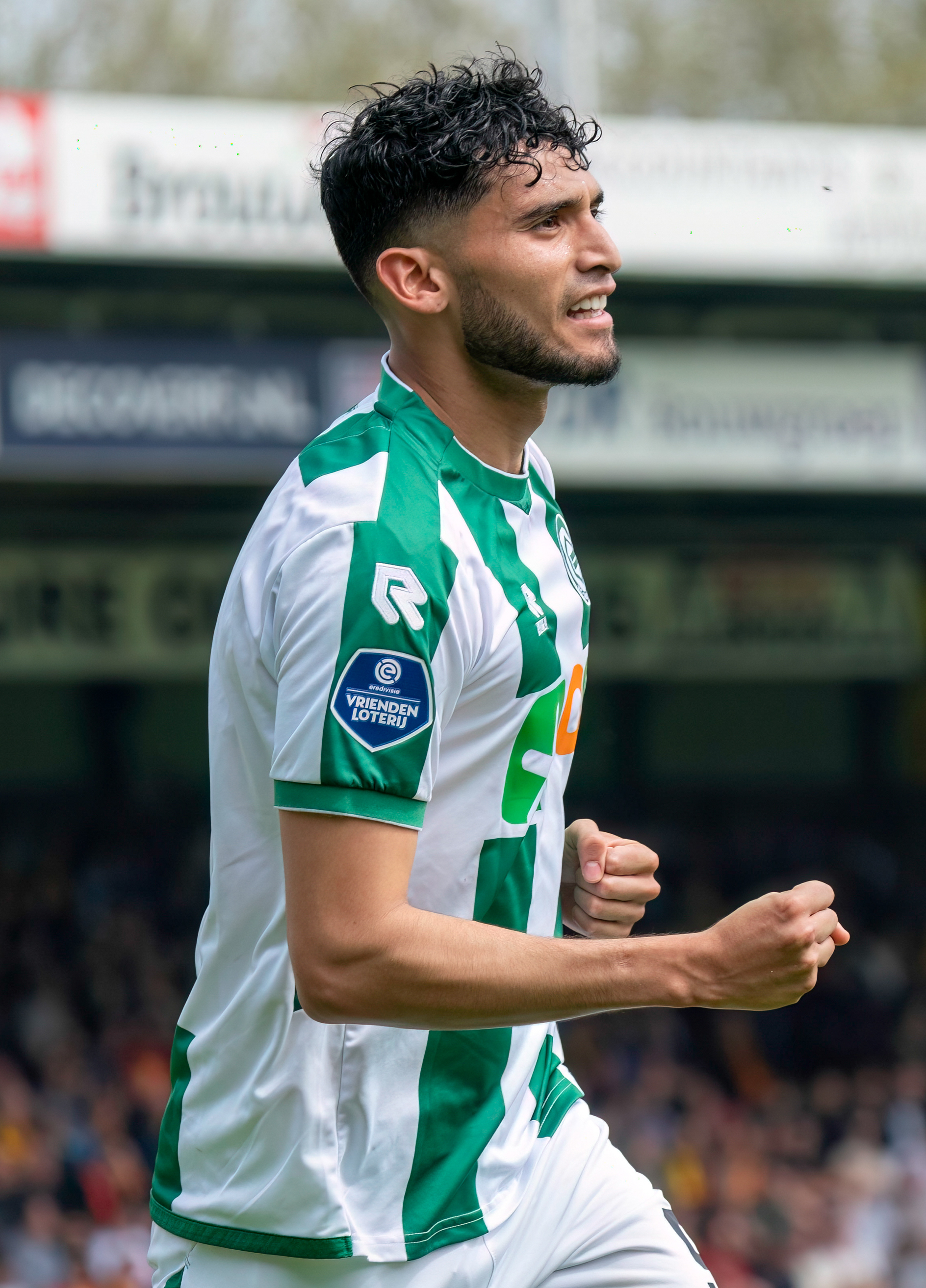
Pepi with Groningen in 2023.

On September 1, 2022, it was announced that Pepi would go on a year-long loan to Eredivisie outfit FC Groningen for the duration of the 2022–23 season. In his competitive debut for the club against Cambuur he tallied an assist on the game's only goal. Pepi's hot start continued in the following match in which he broke an 11-month goal drought in a 2–1 defeat to Sparta Rotterdam. His most recent goal had come on October 7, 2021, in a 2–0 victory over Jamaica for the United States in World Cup qualifying, marking him just 20 days shy of a year without scoring a competitive goal.

Following the September international break, Pepi notched his second goal in as many league games, scoring Groningen's only goal as they suffered a 4–1 defeat to AZ Alkmaar. The following week he scored a brace in a 3–2 defeat to RKC Waalwijk, in the process becoming the first Eredivisie player in the 21st century to score or assist on five goals in his first four league games. In a 3–0 victory over Excelsior on February 25, Pepi scored his tenth goal of his loan spell in just his 20th competitive game for Groningen.

Despite playing for a relegation-threatened side, Pepi earned a spot on the official Eredivisie Team of the Month for February 2023 as the only outfield player not from league powerhouses Ajax, PSV, and Feyenoord.

=== PSV Eindhoven ===
On July 7, 2023, Pepi signed a five-year contract with PSV Eindhoven after the Dutch club agreed to pay $9.8 million to Augsburg for Pepi's transfer. On November 29, 2023, he scored his first UEFA Champions League goal, a 3–2 game winner in stoppage time against Sevilla, which qualified his club to the knockout phase. He has won the Eredivisie three years in a row with PSV Eindhoven in the 2023–2024, 2024–2025, and 2025–2026 seasons.

On March 17, 2026, Pepi reportedly agreed to move to Fulham in the summer for a fee of $46 million. Days later on March 21, despite having a medical, the move collapsed after Fulham and PSV Eindhoven failed to find agreement on liability in the time between the move.

== International career ==
Born in the United States, Pepi was eligible to play for both the United States and Mexico through his parents. He had also previously attended training camps for both the United States under-17 and Mexico under-17 sides. On April 22, 2019, Pepi was included in the United States under-17 squad by Raphaël Wicky for the CONCACAF U-17 Championship. On May 12, Pepi scored his first international goal against Panama, followed by a brace against Canada to help the United States advance to the final. In October 2019, Pepi was included again in the under-17 squad, this time for the FIFA U-17 World Cup.

On August 26, 2021, manager Gregg Berhalter selected Pepi in the United States squad for 2022 FIFA World Cup qualification. On September 8, 2021, Pepi made his debut for the United States and scored the winning goal in a 4–1 away victory against Honduras. His goal was the second of the match, giving the United States a 2–1 lead. He scored twice in his second match, a 2–0 qualifying win against Jamaica played in Austin, Texas.

Despite the early success, Pepi was ultimately not called up to the team's 26-man 2022 World Cup roster. In his first international match following the World Cup, Pepi scored his fourth and fifth international goals as part of a brace in a 7–1 Nations League victory over Grenada. Four days later, he scored the game-winning goal against El Salvador to send the United States into the 2023 Nations League semifinals. In the Nations League semifinal against Mexico, Pepi scored off the bench securing the 3–0 U.S. win.

On October 2, 2024, Pepi was included in Mauricio Pochettino's first roster as the head coach of the USMNT for friendlies against Panama and Mexico. In the October 12 match against Panama, Pepi scored off the bench to ensure a 2–0 U.S. win. On October 13, Pepi returned to PSV due to a minor injury, and was not present for the second match of the international window.

On May 26, 2026, Pepi was selected in the 26-man squad for the 2026 FIFA World Cup.

== Career statistics ==
=== Club ===
As of match played October 31, 2026

Appearances and goals by club, season and competition
Club	Season	League			National cup (Note: Includes U.S. Open Cup, DFB-Pokal, KNVB Cup)		Continental		Other		Total	
Club	Season	Division	Apps	Goals	Apps	Goals	Apps	Goals	Apps	Goals	Apps	Goals
North Texas SC	2019	USL League One	12	9	—		—		1 (Note: Appearance in USL League One playoffs)	2	13	11
North Texas SC	2020	USL League One	1	0	—		—		—		1	0
North Texas SC	Total		13	9	—		—		1	2	14	11
FC Dallas (loan)	2019	MLS	—		2	0	—		—		2	0
FC Dallas	2019	MLS	7	0	—		—		—		7	0
FC Dallas	2020	MLS	17	2	—		—		2 (Note: Appearances in MLS Cup playoffs)	1	19	3
FC Dallas	2021	MLS	31	13	—		—		—		31	13
FC Dallas	Total		55	15	—		—		2	1	57	16
FC Augsburg	2021–22	Bundesliga	11	0	—		—		—		11	0
FC Augsburg	2022–23	Bundesliga	4	0	1	0	—		—		5	0
FC Augsburg	Total		15	0	1	0	—		—		16	0
Groningen (loan)	2022–23	Eredivisie	29	12	2	1	—		—		31	13
Jong PSV	2023–24	Eerste Divisie	1	0	—		—		—		1	0
Jong PSV	2024–25	Eerste Divisie	1	1	—		—		—		1	1
Jong PSV	Total		2	1	—		—		—		2	1
PSV	2023–24	Eredivisie	27	7	2	0	10 (Note: Appearances in UEFA Champions League)	2	1 (Note: Appearance in Johan Cruyff Shield)	0	40	9
PSV	2024–25	Eredivisie	18	11	2	4	7	2	1	0	28	17
PSV	2025–26	Eredivisie	26	16	2	0	5	3	1	0	34	19
PSV	2026–27	Eredivisie	8	4	0	0	1	0	—		9	4
PSV	Total		79	38	6	4	23	7	3	0	111	49
Career total			193	75	11	5	23	7	6	3	233	90

=== International ===
As of match played July 6, 2026

Appearances and goals by national team and year
National team	Year	Apps	Goals
United States	2021	7	3
United States	2022	5	0
United States	2023	10	7
United States	2024	11	3
United States	2025	1	0
United States	2026	8	0
Total		42	13

United States score listed first, score column indicates score after each Pepi goal.

List of international goals scored by Ricardo Pepi
No.	Date	Venue	Cap	Opponent	Score	Result	Competition
1	September 8, 2021	Estadio Olímpico Metropolitano, San Pedro Sula, Honduras	1	Honduras	2–1	4–1	2022 FIFA World Cup qualification
2	October 7, 2021	Q2 Stadium, Austin, United States	2	Jamaica	1–0	2–0	2022 FIFA World Cup qualification
3	October 7, 2021	Q2 Stadium, Austin, United States	2	Jamaica	2–0	2–0	2022 FIFA World Cup qualification
4	March 24, 2023	Kirani James Athletic Stadium, St. George's, Grenada	13	Grenada	1–0	7–1	2022–23 CONCACAF Nations League A
5	March 24, 2023	Kirani James Athletic Stadium, St. George's, Grenada	13	Grenada	6–1	7–1	2022–23 CONCACAF Nations League A
6	March 27, 2023	Exploria Stadium, Orlando, United States	14	El Salvador	1–0	1–0	2022–23 CONCACAF Nations League A
7	June 15, 2023	Allegiant Stadium, Paradise, United States	15	Mexico	3–0	3–0	2023 CONCACAF Nations League Finals
8	September 9, 2023	CityPark, St. Louis, United States	17	Uzbekistan	2–0	3–0	Friendly
9	September 12, 2023	Allianz Field, Saint Paul, United States	18	Oman	3–0	4–0	Friendly
10	November 16, 2023	Q2 Stadium, Austin, United States	21	Trinidad and Tobago	1–0	3–0	2023–24 CONCACAF Nations League A
11	October 12, 2024	Q2 Stadium, Austin, United States	31	Panama	2–0	2–0	Friendly
12	November 14, 2024	Independence Park, Kingston, Jamaica	32	Jamaica	1–0	1–0	2024–25 CONCACAF Nations League A
13	November 18, 2024	CityPark, St. Louis, United States	33	Jamaica	3–0	4–2	2024–25 CONCACAF Nations League A

== Honors ==
North Texas SC

- USL League One Regular Season: 2019
- USL League One Championship: 2019

PSV

- Eredivisie: 2023–24, 2024–25, 2025–26
- Johan Cruyff Shield: 2023, 2025

United States

- CONCACAF Nations League: 2022–23, 2023–24

Individual

- MLS All-Star: 2021
- MLS Young Player of the Year: 2021
- Eredivisie Team of the Month: November 2024
