= Bryan Reynolds (soccer) =

American soccer player (born 2001)

Personal information
- Full name: Bryan Keith Reynolds Jr.
- Date of birth: June 28, 2001 (age 25)
- Place of birth: Fort Worth, Texas, U.S.
- Height: 6 ft 3 in (1.91 m)
- Position: Right-back

Team information
- Current team: Rennes
- Number: 14

Youth career
- 2015–2018: FC Dallas

Senior career*
Years	Team	Apps	(Gls)
2017–2021	FC Dallas	27	(0)
2019	→ North Texas SC (loan)	10	(1)
2021	→ Roma (loan)	5	(0)
2021–2023	Roma	1	(0)
2022	→ Kortrijk (loan)	9	(1)
2022–2023	→ Westerlo (loan)	32	(1)
2023–2026	Westerlo	109	(3)
2026–	Rennes	4	(0)

International career^{‡}
2016–2017	United States U16	3	(0)
2016–2017	United States U17	16	(3)
2018	United States U18	5	(0)
2023–2024	United States U23	7	(0)
2021–	United States	8	(1)
- * Club domestic league appearances and goals as of October 11, 2026 ‡ National team caps and goals as of 02:26, November 15, 2026 (UTC)

Bryan Keith Reynolds Jr. (born June 28, 2001) is an American professional soccer player who plays as a right-back for Ligue 1 club Rennes and the United States men's national team.

== Club career ==
After playing with the FC Dallas academy, Reynolds became the club's youngest ever Homegrown Player on November 23, 2016, when he signed a contract with the first team. Although he played with the Dallas academy as a forward, Reynolds was used as a fullback with the Dallas first team.

Reynolds was on loan to North Texas SC in March 2019. Reynolds made his FC Dallas debut on May 19, 2019, against Los Angeles FC. He recorded his first career assist on May 25 against Vancouver Whitecaps FC. On August 27, 2019, Reynolds scored his first professional goal for North Texas SC in a match against Tormenta FC.

On September 23, 2020, Reynolds signed a four-year contract with FC Dallas. In October 2020, he was ranked in Major League Soccer's "22 Under 22" rankings.

On February 1, 2021, Reynolds joined Serie A club Roma on an initial 6-month loan with an obligation to buy.

Having seen limited minutes, Reynolds was loaned to Kortrijk in Belgium for five months in January 2022.

On June 21, 2022, Reynolds moved on a season-long loan to another Belgian club, Westerlo.

On July 30, 2023, Westerlo announced the permanent signing of Reynolds on a four-year deal, for a reported fee of €3.5 million.

On July 9, 2026, Reynolds moved to Rennes in France on a four-year deal.

== International career ==
Reynolds was named to the United States under-17 team roster for the 2017 FIFA U-17 World Cup.

He received his first call up to the senior United States squad in March 2021. On March 28, 2021, Reynolds made his debut for the senior national team in a friendly against Northern Ireland.

Reynolds was called up to the 2023 CONCACAF Gold Cup roster for the United States. Reynolds started and scored his first senior international goal with a long-range effort against St. Kitts and Nevis. Reynolds also started the final group stage match against Trinidad and Tobago. He made his knockout stage debut versus Canada, starting in the quarter-finals and being subbed out in extra time as the United States advanced on penalties.

On October 8, 2023, Reynolds was called up to the United States under-23 national team ahead of friendlies against Mexico and Japan.

== Career statistics ==
=== Club ===
As of match played October 15, 2026

Appearances and goals by club, season and competition
Club	Season	League			National cup (Note: Includes U.S. Open Cup, Belgian Cup)		Continental		Other		Total	
Club	Season	Division	Apps	Goals	Apps	Goals	Apps	Goals	Apps	Goals	Apps	Goals
FC Dallas	2019	MLS	10	0	2	0	—		—		12	0
FC Dallas	2020	MLS	17	0	—		—		2 (Note: Appearances in MLS Cup playoffs)	0	19	0
FC Dallas	Total		27	0	2	0	—		2	0	31	0
North Texas SC (loan)	2019	USL League One	10	1	—		—		2 (Note: Appearances in USL League One playoffs)	0	12	1
Roma (loan)	2020–21	Serie A	5	0	—		—		—		5	0
Roma	2021–22	Serie A	1	0	—		2 (Note: Appearances in UEFA Europa Conference League)	0	—		3	0
Roma	Roma total		6	0	—		2	0	—		8	0
Kortrijk (loan)	2021–22	Belgian Pro League	9	1	—		—		—		9	1
Westerlo (loan)	2022–23	Belgian Pro League	32	1	2	0	—		—		34	1
Westerlo	2023–24	Belgian Pro League	33	0	1	0	—		—		34	0
Westerlo	2024–25	Belgian Pro League	37	1	1	1	—		—		38	2
Westerlo	2025–26	Belgian Pro League	39	2	1	0	—		—		40	2
Westerlo	Westerlo total		141	4	5	1	—		—		146	5
Rennes	2026–27	Ligue 1	4	0	0	0	2 (Note: Appearances in UEFA Europa League)	0	—		6	0
Career total			197	6	7	1	4	0	4	0	212	7

=== International ===
As of match played November 14, 2026

Appearances and goals by national team and year
National team	Year	Apps	Goals
United States	2021	2	0
United States	2023	5	1
United States	2026	1	0
Total		8	1

Scores and results list United States' goal tally first, score column indicates score after each Reynolds goal.

List of international goals scored by Bryan Reynolds
No.	Date	Venue	Opponent	Score	Result	Competition
1	June 28, 2023	CityPark, St. Louis, United States	Saint Kitts and Nevis	2–0	6–0	2023 CONCACAF Gold Cup
