= Dante Sealy =

Trinidadian footballer (born 2003)

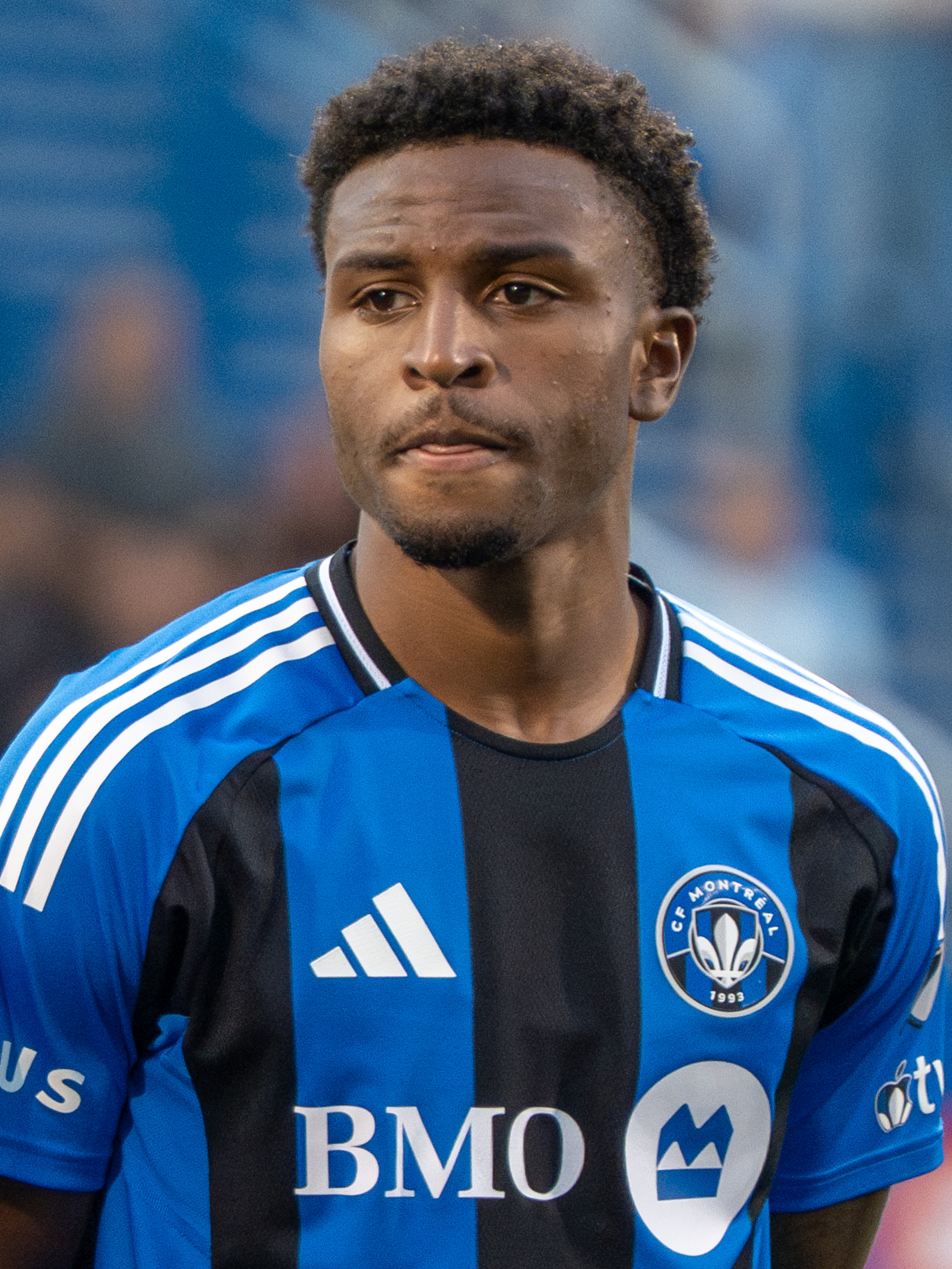
- Sealy with CF Montréal in 2025

Personal information
- Full name: Dante Isiah Sealy
- Date of birth: April 17, 2003 (age 23)
- Place of birth: Brooklyn, New York, United States
- Height: 5 ft 10 in (1.78 m)
- Position: Winger

Team information
- Current team: CF Montréal
- Number: 17

Youth career
- 2012–2019: FC Dallas

Senior career*
Years	Team	Apps	(Gls)
2019–2024	FC Dallas	38	(2)
2019	→ North Texas SC	19	(1)
2021–2023	→ Jong PSV (loan)	54	(6)
2025	CF Montréal	30	(9)
2026	Colorado Rapids	20	(0)
2026–	CF Montréal	0	(0)

International career^{‡}
2018–2019	United States U16	9	(4)
2017	United States U17	2	(0)
2020–2021	United States U20	3	(0)
2025–	Trinidad and Tobago	11	(4)
- * Club domestic league appearances and goals as of August 28, 2026 ‡ National team caps and goals as of October 11, 2026

Dante Isiah Sealy (born April 17, 2003) is a professional soccer player who plays as a winger for Major League Soccer club CF Montréal. Born in the United States, he represents the Trinidad and Tobago national team.

== Club career ==
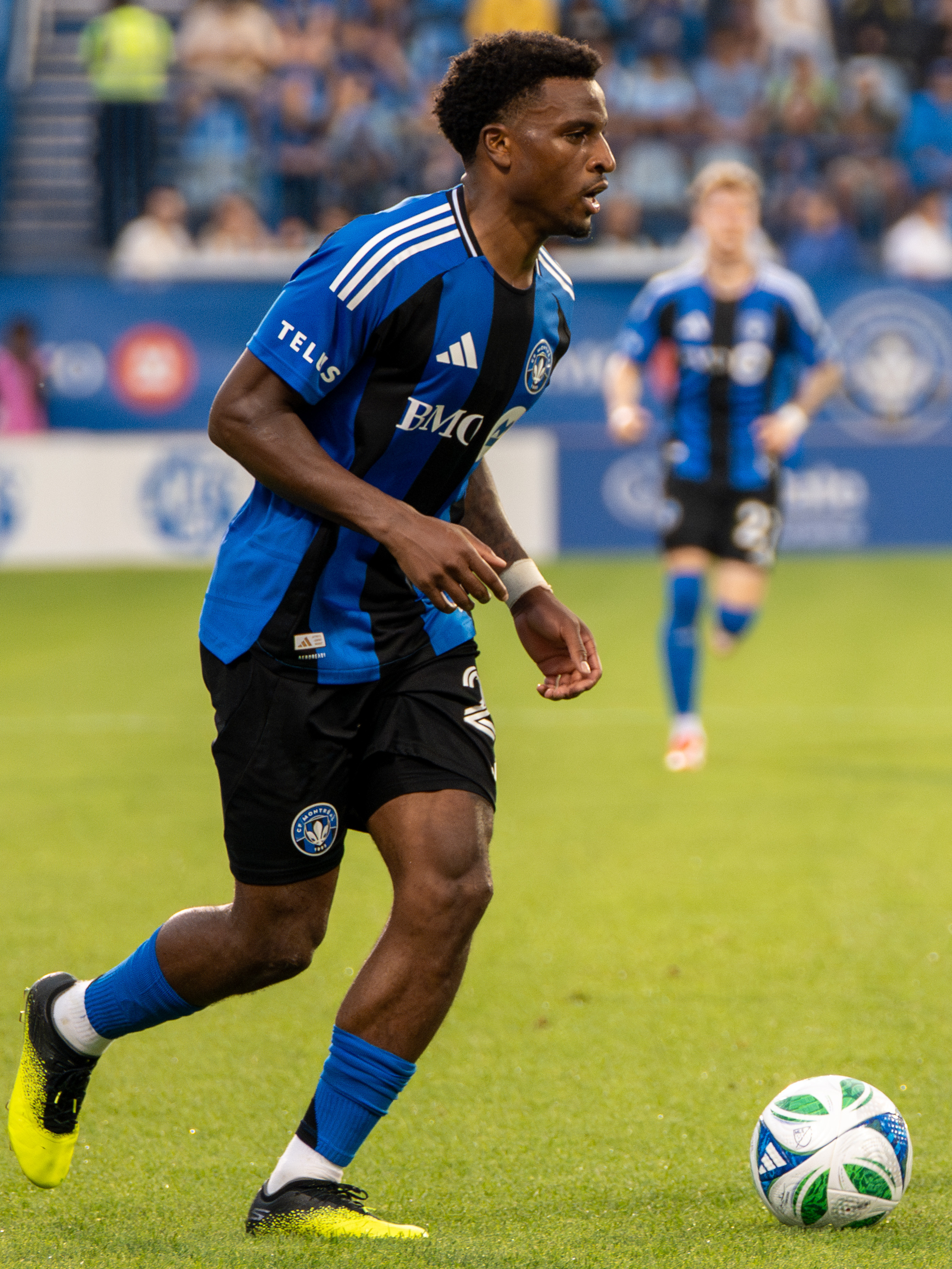
Dante Sealy in 2025

Sealy advanced through the FC Dallas academy, signing a professional contract February 26, 2019. The next day, he went on loan to FC Dallas's USL League One affiliate, North Texas SC, where he remained for the 2019 season. He returned to FC Dallas for the 2020 season, during which he made 11 appearances for the senior squad, scoring one goal.

On August 11, 2021, Sealy signed a two-year loan deal with Jong PSV, the reserve squad for Eredivisie club PSV Eindhoven. He returned to Dallas in July 2023. He was released by Dallas following their 2024 season.

Sealy joined Major League Soccer side CF Montréal on February 6, 2025, signing a two-year contract with a club option for a third season. During the 2025 season, Sealy recorded a career high 9 goals and 2 assists in 30 matches.

On December 23, 2025, the Colorado Rapids acquired Sealy in exchange for a club-record $1.9 million in General Allocation Money (GAM), with additional performance-based incentives.

== International career ==
Sealy has featured for the United States at the under-16, under-17, and under-20 levels. He was called up to Trinidad and Tobago in 2025, making his debut against Saint Kitts and Nevis on June 6 and scoring twice on his debut.

== Personal life ==
Dante is the son of former FC Dallas and Trinidad and Tobago international player Scott Sealy.

== Career statistics ==
=== Club ===
As of match played 8 September 2024

Appearances and goals by club, season and competition
Club	Season	League			National cup		Continental		Total	
Club	Season	Division	Apps	Goals	Apps	Goals	Apps	Goals	Apps	Goals
North Texas SC	2019	USL League One	19	1	—		—		19	1
FC Dallas	2020	MLS	5	0	—		—		5	0
FC Dallas	2021	MLS	6	1	—		—		6	1
FC Dallas	2022	MLS	13	0	—		—		13	0
FC Dallas	2024	MLS	17	1	1	0	0	0	18	1
FC Dallas	Total		41	2	1	0	0	0	42	2
Jong PSV (loan)	2021-22	Eerste Divisie	27	5	—		—		27	5
Jong PSV (loan)	2022-23	Eerste Divisie	27	1	—		—		27	1
Jong PSV (loan)	Total		54	6	—		—		54	6
Career Total			114	9	1	0	0	0	115	9

=== International ===
As of match played 10 October 2026

Appearances and goals by national team and year
National team	Year	Apps	Goals
Trinidad and Tobago
Trinidad and Tobago	2025	10	4
Trinidad and Tobago	2026	1	0
Total		11	4

Scores and results list Trinidad and Tobago goal tally first, score column indicates score after each Sealy goal

List of international goals scored by Dante Sealy
No.	Date	Venue	Opponent	Score	Result	Competition
1	6 June 2025	Hasely Crawford Stadium, Port of Spain, Trinidad and Tobago	Saint Kitts and Nevis	2–1	6–2	2026 FIFA World Cup qualification
2	6 June 2025	Hasely Crawford Stadium, Port of Spain, Trinidad and Tobago	Saint Kitts and Nevis	4–2	6–2	2026 FIFA World Cup qualification
3	22 June 2025	Allegiant Stadium, Paradise, United States	Saudi Arabia	1–0	1–1	2025 CONCACAF Gold Cup
4	10 October 2025	Bermuda National Stadium, Hamilton, Bermuda	Bermuda	1–0	3–0	2026 FIFA World Cup qualification

== Honors ==
North Texas

- USL League One regular season (premiership): 2019
- USL League One championship: 2019
