= Oscar Romero (soccer) =

American soccer player

Personal information
- Full name: Oscar Salvador Romero
- Date of birth: October 8, 1996 (age 30)
- Place of birth: Florida, United States
- Height: 1.78 m (5 ft 10 in)
- Position: Midfielder

Team information
- Current team: Dallas Sidekicks
- Number: 18

Youth career
- 2013–2016: FC Dallas
- 2017–2018: UNAM

Senior career*
Years	Team	Apps	(Gls)
2016	Inter Playa del Carmen	19	(6)
2017–2018	UNAM Premier	13	(3)
2019–2020	North Texas SC	22	(5)
2020	Mesquite Outlaws (indoor)	9	(5)
2020–	Dallas Sidekicks (indoor)	41	(20)
- * Club domestic league appearances and goals as of November 27, 2024

Oscar Salvador Romero (born October 8, 1996) is an American professional soccer player who plays as a midfielder for the Dallas Sidekicks in the Major Arena Soccer League.
