= Santiago Mosquera =

Colombian footballer (born 1995)

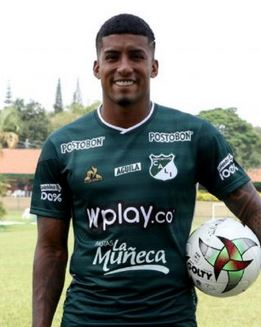
- Mosquera with Deportivo Cali in 2022

Personal information
- Full name: Hárold Santiago Mosquera Caicedo
- Date of birth: 7 February 1995 (age 31)
- Place of birth: Buenaventura, Colombia
- Height: 1.72 m (5 ft 8 in)
- Position: Winger

Team information
- Current team: Santa Fe
- Number: 23

Youth career
- –2012: Escuela Sarmiento Lora
- 2012–2016: Millonarios

Senior career*
Years	Team	Apps	(Gls)
2016–2018	Millonarios	54	(8)
2018–2020	FC Dallas	76	(13)
2021–2022	Pachuca	21	(0)
2022	→ Deportivo Cali (loan)	23	(2)
2023–2024	OFI	35	(1)
2024–	Santa Fe	64	(14)
- * Club domestic league appearances and goals as of 11 December 2025

Hárold Santiago Mosquera Caicedo (born 7 February 1995) Santi Mosquera is a Colombian professional footballer who plays as a winger for Santa Fe.

== Career ==
Santi Mosquera began his career with two seasons for Colombian first division side Millonarios.

In February 2018, Mosquera signed with FC Dallas of Major League Soccer. He had his contract optioned declined by Dallas following their 2020 season.

== Club statistics ==
Club	Division	Season	League			Cup			Continental			Total			Prom.
Club	Division	Season	Apps	Goals	Assist	Apps	Goals	Assist	Apps	Goals	Assist	Apps	Goals	Assist	Prom.
Millonarios	Categoría Primera A	2016	8	0	0	4	0	1	—			12	0	1	0
Millonarios	Categoría Primera A	2017	46	8	9	4	1	2	1	0	0	51	9	11	0.18
Millonarios	Categoría Primera A	2018	—			1	0	0	—			1	0	0	0
Millonarios	Total		54	8	9	9	1	3	1	0	0	64	9	12	0.14
FC Dallas	Major League Soccer	2018	30	6	5	1	0	0	2	0	1	33	6	6	0.18
FC Dallas	Major League Soccer	2019	24	3	2	—			—			24	3	2	0.13
FC Dallas	Major League Soccer	2020	13	4	0	—			—			13	4	0	0.31
FC Dallas	Total		67	13	7	1	0	0	2	0	1	70	13	8	0.19
Pachuca	Liga MX	2020-21	9	0	0	—			—			9	0	0	0
Pachuca	Liga MX	2021-22	12	0	0	—			—			12	0	0	0
Pachuca	Total		21	0	0	0	0	0	0	0	0	21	0	0	0
Deportivo Cali	Categoría Primera A	2022	9	2	0	4	0	0	6	2	0	19	4	0	0.21
Deportivo Cali	Total		9	2	0	4	0	0	6	2	0	19	4	0	0.21
OFI	Super League Greece	2022-23	12	1	1	-	-	-	-	-	-	12	1	1	0.08
OFI	Super League Greece	2023-24	23	0	2	4	2	0	-	-	-	27	2	2	0.08
OFI	Total		35	1	3	4	2	0	-	-	-	39	3	3	0.08
Santa Fe	Categoría Primera A	2024	19	6	2	1	0	0	-	-	-	20	6	2	0.30
Santa Fe	Categoría Primera A	2025	6	0	4	0	0	0	2	0	1	8	0	5	0
Santa Fe	Total		25	6	6	1	0	0	2	0	1	28	6	7	0.25
Career Total			211	30	25	19	3	3	11	2	2	241	35	30	0.15

== Honours ==
Title	Club	Country	Year
Torneo Finalización	Millonarios	Colombia	2017
Superliga de Colombia	Millonarios	Colombia	2018
