= Hell Is Real derby =

Soccer rivalry between the Columbus Crew and FC Cincinnati

- Location: Ohio
- Teams: Columbus Crew; FC Cincinnati
- First meeting: June 14, 2017; U.S. Open Cup; CIN 1–0 CLB
- Latest meeting: October 18, 2026; MLS regular season CIN 0–2 CLB
- Stadiums: ScottsMiracle-Gro Field, Columbus; TQL Stadium, Cincinnati

Statistics
- Total meetings: 23
- Most wins: Columbus Crew (10)
- Top scorer: Gyasi Zardes (7 goals)
- All-time series: Columbus: 11; Drawn: 6 Cincinnati: 6
- Largest victory: CIN 0–4 CLB; MLS is Back Tournament (July 11, 2020); CLB 4–0 CIN; MLS Cup playoffs (November 2, 2025)
- Location of the two teams in Ohio (red), as well as the namesake billboard (blue)

The Hell Is Real derby is a rivalry between the two Major League Soccer (MLS) clubs based in Ohio: the Columbus Crew and FC Cincinnati. Under current MLS regular season scheduling, the series occurs twice per season as both teams are members of the Eastern Conference. The teams first met in 2017 in the U.S. Open Cup before Cincinnati joined MLS in 2019.

Hell Is Real takes its name from a Christian highway billboard located on Interstate 71 between Columbus and Cincinnati. The two teams' MLS Next Pro affiliates, the Columbus Crew 2 and FC Cincinnati 2, parody Hell Is Real for their matches and use the name Heck is Plausible.

== Background ==
FC Cincinnati was founded in 2015 as a United Soccer League club. After three seasons in the second-division league, Cincinnati moved to MLS in 2019 and joined the Columbus Crew, who had been a league member since their inaugural season in 1996. The Ohio clubs met for the first time with lower-league Cincinnati winning 1–0 in the 2017 U.S. Open Cup fourth round.

In October 2017, Columbus owner Anthony Precourt threatened to move the team to Austin, Texas, putting the prospect of an MLS rivalry between the two Ohio teams in jeopardy. Precourt's proposed relocation sparked outrage in the American soccer community, creating the #SaveTheCrew movement. After a year of support by fans, rival teams, local businesses, and politicians, the Crew committed to staying in Columbus in November 2018, when the Haslam family (owners of the NFL's Cleveland Browns, which had been the subject of a controversial relocation in the 1990s) purchased the club.

== History ==
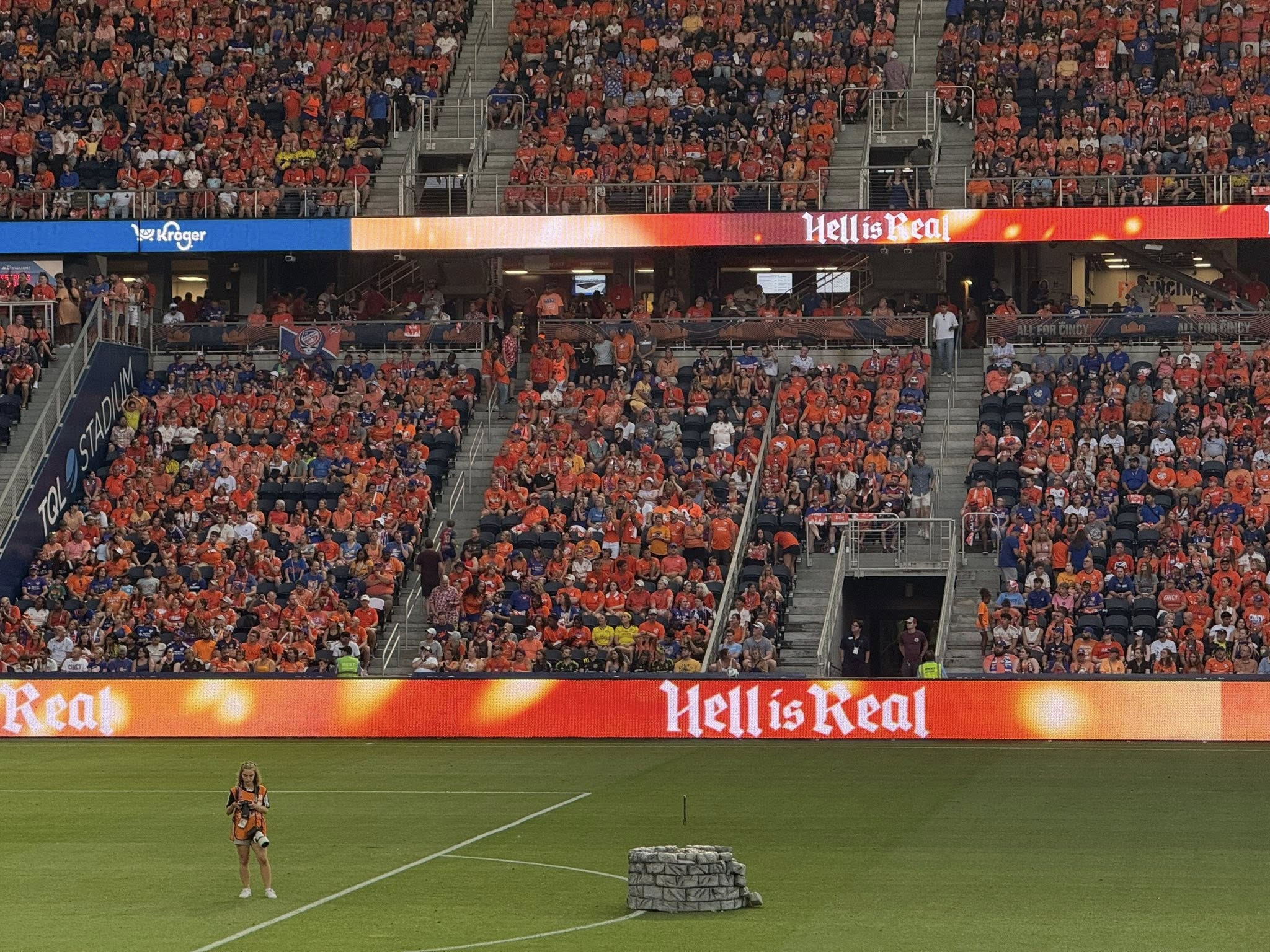
Hell is Real signage at Cincinnati stadium

The two teams met for the first time in the fourth round of the 2017 U.S. Open Cup, while FC Cincinnati was still a member of the United Soccer League. Cincinnati won the match 1–0 on a goal from Djiby, knocking Columbus out of the tournament and advancing to the quarterfinals.

On August 10, 2019, the two sides played against each other in MLS league play for the first time, ending in a 2–2 draw at Mapfre Stadium. Columbus earned their first win of the series in that season's reverse fixture with a 3–1 victory. The highest-scoring match came in 2021, when the Crew pulled off a late comeback at their new Lower.com Field; holding a 2–1 lead in the 75th minute, FC Cincinnati surrendered two late goals to lose 3–2.

The first MLS Cup Playoffs match between the two teams took place in the Eastern Conference Final on December 2, 2023. The match was hosted by FC Cincinnati and resulted in a 3–2 victory for the Columbus Crew after FC Cincinnati led 2–0 in the first half but conceded two goals in the second half. The Crew went on to score the winning goal in the 25th minute of extra time, enabling them to win the MLS Cup the following week.

== Name ==
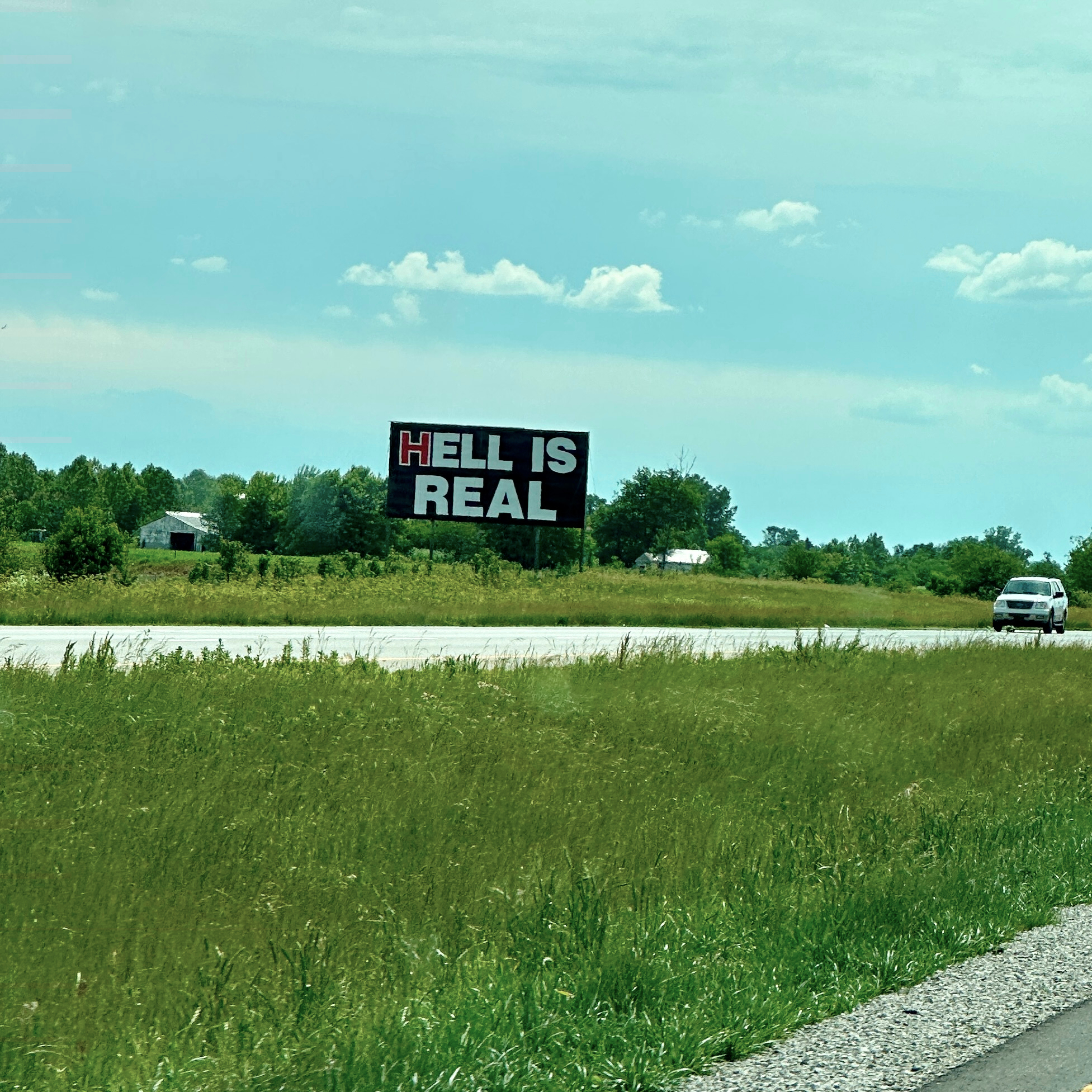
The rivalry's name was inspired by a sign erected along the section of Interstate 71 that connects Columbus and Cincinnati.

The rivalry's name was created by fans of both teams in 2017, prior to the first competitive meeting in the U.S. Open Cup. It is derived from a religious sign that reads "HELL IS REAL" located on Interstate 71, the highway that connects Columbus and Cincinnati–a distance of 110 miles (180 km). The sign was installed in 2004 on a local farm in Chenoweth by a Kentucky developer who had installed similar religious signs in other states.

The name of the rivalry between the clubs’ MLS Next Pro affiliates, Columbus Crew 2 and FC Cincinnati 2, “Heck is Plausible” is derived from this name.

== Statistics ==
=== Summary ===
As of October 18, 2026

Competitions	Matches	CLB wins	CLB goals	Draws	CIN wins	CIN goals
MLS regular season	18	9	37	6	3	20
U.S. Open Cup	1	0	0	0	1	1
MLS Cup playoffs	4	2	8	0	2	5
Total	23	11	45	6	6	26

=== Honors ===
As of August 27, 2024

Honor	Columbus Crew	FC Cincinnati	Total
MLS Cup	3	0	3
Supporters' Shield	3	1	4
U.S. Open Cup	1	0	1
Campeones Cup	1	0	1
Leagues Cup	1	0	1
Overall	9	1	10

== Match results ==
Columbus Crew wins FC Cincinnati wins Draws

Season	Date	Competition	Stadium	Home team	Result	Away team	Attendance	Series (W–L–T)	Ref.
2017	June 14	U.S. Open Cup	Nippert Stadium	FC Cincinnati	1–0	Columbus Crew SC	30,160	CIN 1–0–0	
2019	August 10	MLS	Mapfre Stadium	Columbus Crew SC	2–2	FC Cincinnati	20,865	CIN 1–0–1	
2019	August 25	MLS	Nippert Stadium	FC Cincinnati	1–3	Columbus Crew SC	30,611	Tied 1–1–1	
2020	July 11	MLS is Back‡	ESPN Sports Complex	FC Cincinnati	0–4	Columbus Crew SC	0†	CLB 2–1–1	
2020	August 29	MLS	Nippert Stadium	FC Cincinnati	0–0	Columbus Crew SC	0†	CLB 2–1–2	
2020	September 6	MLS	Mapfre Stadium	Columbus Crew SC	3–0	FC Cincinnati	1,500†	CLB 3–1–2	
2020	October 14	MLS	Nippert Stadium	FC Cincinnati	2–1	Columbus Crew SC	0†	CLB 3–2–2	
2021	July 9	MLS	TQL Stadium	FC Cincinnati	2–2	Columbus Crew	25,701	CLB 3–2–3	
2021	August 27	MLS	Lower.com Field	Columbus Crew	3–2	FC Cincinnati	19,949	CLB 4–2–3	
2022	July 17	MLS	Lower.com Field	Columbus Crew	2–0	FC Cincinnati	20,741	CLB 5–2–3	
2022	August 27	MLS	TQL Stadium	FC Cincinnati	2–2	Columbus Crew	25,037	CLB 5–2–4	
2023	May 20	MLS	TQL Stadium	FC Cincinnati	3–2	Columbus Crew	25,513	CLB 5–3–4	
2023	August 20	MLS	Lower.com Field	Columbus Crew	3–0	FC Cincinnati	20,730	CLB 6–3–4	
2023	December 2	MLS Cup playoffs	TQL Stadium	FC Cincinnati	2–3 (a.e.t.)	Columbus Crew	25,513	CLB 7–3–4	
2024	May 11	MLS	Lower.com Field	Columbus Crew	1–2	FC Cincinnati	20,900	CLB 7–4–4	
2024	September 14	MLS	TQL Stadium	FC Cincinnati	0–0	Columbus Crew	25,513	CLB 7–4–5	
2025	May 17	MLS	Lower.com Field	Columbus Crew	1–1	FC Cincinnati	20,363	CLB 7–4–6	
2025	July 12	MLS	TQL Stadium	FC Cincinnati	2–4	Columbus Crew	25,513	CLB 8–4–6	
2025	October 27	MLS Cup playoffs	TQL Stadium	FC Cincinnati	1–0	Columbus Crew	23,371	CLB 8–5–6	
2025	November 2	MLS Cup playoffs	Lower.com Field	Columbus Crew	4–0	FC Cincinnati	19,506	CLB 9–5–6	
2025	November 8	MLS Cup playoffs	TQL Stadium	FC Cincinnati	2–1	Columbus Crew	25,513	CLB 9–6–6	
2026	July 25	MLS	ScottsMiracle-Gro Field	Columbus Crew	2–1	FC Cincinnati	20,307	CLB 10–6–6	
2026	October 18	MLS	TQL Stadium	FC Cincinnati	0–2	Columbus Crew	25,513	CLB 11–6–6	

† Matches played behind closed doors or reduced capacity due to the COVID-19 pandemic.

‡ Although the match was part of the MLS is Back Tournament, group stage matches counted toward regular season MLS statistics.

== Eastern Conference standings finishes ==
Columbus Crew FC Cincinnati

P.	2019	2020	2021	2022	2023	2024	2025	2026
1					1			
2						2	2	
3		3			3	3		
4								
5				5				
6								
7							7	7
8				8				
9			9					9
10	10							
11								
12	12							
13								
14		14	14					
15								

• Total: Columbus with 5 higher finishes, Cincinnati with 3.

== Top goalscorers ==
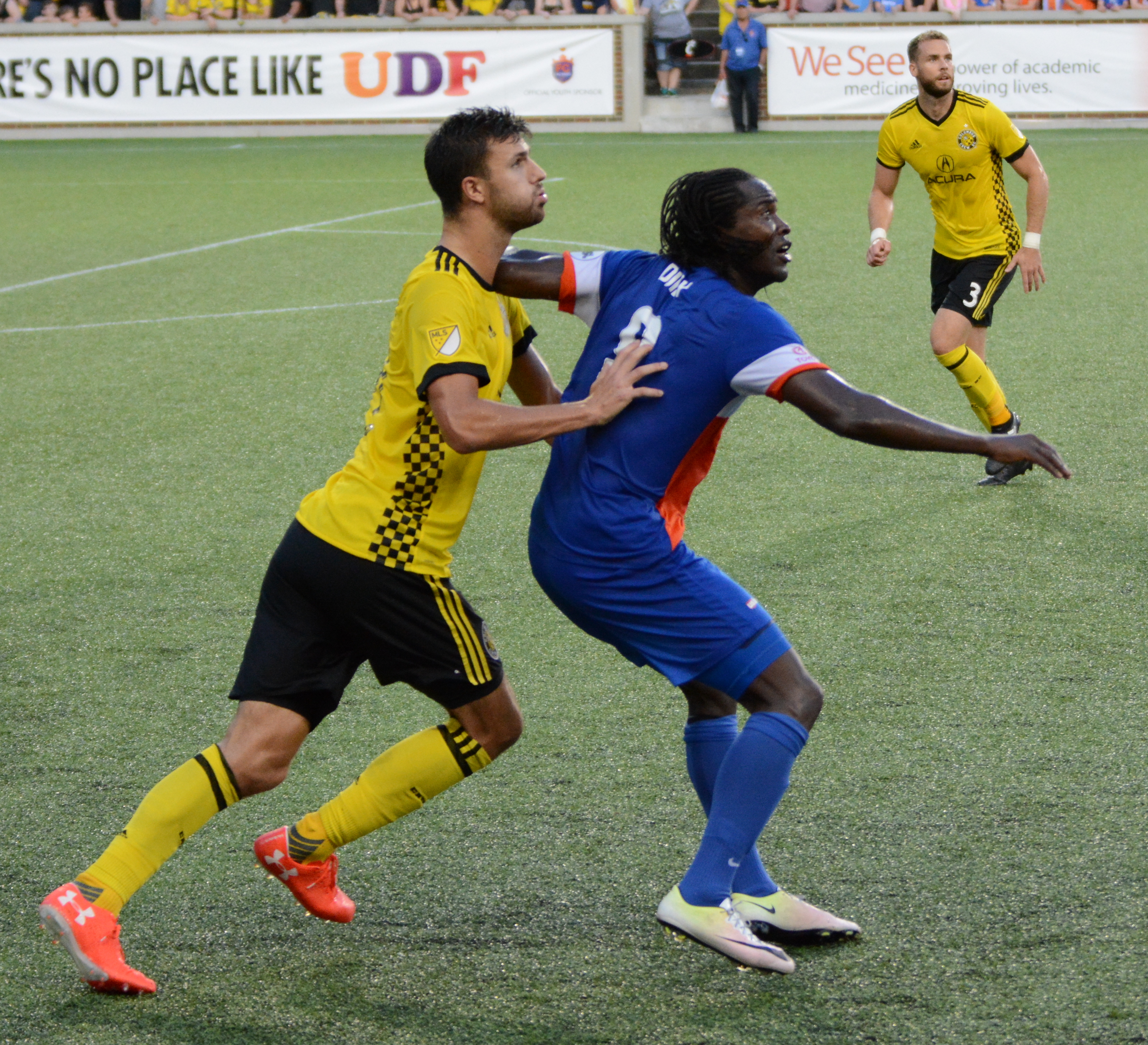
Alex Crognale of Columbus and Baye Djiby Fall of Cincinnati battle for a header in the 2017 U.S. Open Cup.

As of November 8, 2025

Rank	Player	Team	Goals
1	(United States) Gyasi Zardes	Columbus Crew	7
2	(Argentina) Luciano Acosta	FC Cincinnati	5
2	(Armenia) Lucas Zelarayán	Columbus Crew	5
4	(United States) Maximilian Arfsten	Columbus Crew	3
4	(Spain) Miguel Berry	Columbus Crew	3
4	(Uruguay) Diego Rossi	Columbus Crew	3
4	(Canada) Jacen Russell-Rowe	Columbus Crew	3
4	(Portugal) Pedro Santos	Columbus Crew	3
9	(Colombia) Cucho Hernández	Columbus Crew	2
9	(United States) Taha Habroune	Columbus Crew	2
9	(Brazil) Brenner	FC Cincinnati	2
9	(Togo) Kévin Denkey	FC Cincinnati	2
9	(United States) Brandon Vazquez	FC Cincinnati	2

=== Own goals ===
- (Jamaica) Alvas Powell (December 2, 2023)
- (United States) Miles Robinson (July 12, 2025)

== Players who played for both clubs ==
Player	Columbus career span	Cincinnati career span
(Panama) Cristian Martínez (Note: Played for FC Cincinnati in the United Soccer League, before they joined MLS.)	2016–2018	2017
(The Gambia) Kekuta Manneh	2017	2019–2020
(Haiti) Derrick Etienne Jr.	2020–2022	2019
(Nigeria) Fanendo Adi	2020	2018–2019
(United States) Fatai Alashe	2020	2018–2020
(United States) Saad Abdul-Salaam	2021	2020
(Ecuador) Gustavo Vallecilla	2023	2021–2022
(Sierra Leone) Kei Kamara	2006–2007; 2015–2016	2025

== See also ==
- MLS rivalry cups
