= MLS rivalry cups =

Soccer league trophies in the United States and Canada

In Major League Soccer, several teams annually compete for secondary rivalry cups that are usually contested by only two teams, with the only exceptions being the Cascadia Cup and the new Copa Tejas, which are contested by three MLS teams, each. Each cup or trophy is awarded to the eligible team with the better regular season record and are comparable to minor trophies played for in college football rivalries. Most cups are deliberately conceived as local derbies between teams in the same region. Rivalry cups are considered a tradition to most MLS fans and players alike. Out of the ten original MLS teams only three have not competed in these rivalry cups: Sporting Kansas City, New England Revolution, and the defunct Tampa Bay Mutiny. The Texas Derby is the only MLS rivalry where the winner does not walk away with a cup trophy but instead they play for "El Capitán", a replica 18th century mountain howitzer cannon. Some derbies only contest for bragging rights of rival supporters groups.

== Summary ==
=== Official ===
All records reflect wins made when all participating franchises are MLS teams.

Derby name	Most wins	Titles	Other club(s)	Titles	Recent winner
Atlantic Cup	New York Red Bulls	16	D.C. United	15	D.C. United
Brimstone Cup	FC Dallas	12	Chicago Fire FC	9	Chicago Fire
Cascadia Cup*	Seattle Sounders FC	5	Portland Timbers	4	Vancouver Whitecaps FC
Cascadia Cup*	Vancouver Whitecaps FC	5	Portland Timbers	4	Vancouver Whitecaps FC
Copa Tejas**	FC Dallas	2	Houston Dynamo FC	1	Houston Dynamo FC
Copa Tejas**	Austin FC	2	Houston Dynamo FC	1	Houston Dynamo FC
Heritage Cup	Seattle Sounders FC	9	San Jose Earthquakes	8	Seattle Sounders FC
Hudson River Derby	New York Red Bulls	6	New York City FC	5	New York City FC
Rocky Mountain Cup	Real Salt Lake	14	Colorado Rapids	7	Colorado Rapids
Texas Derby	FC Dallas	11	Houston Dynamo FC	9	Houston Dynamo FC
Trillium Cup	Columbus Crew	11	Toronto FC	8	Columbus Crew

* Cascadia Cup existed in USL prior to the entry of franchises into MLS by Portland, Seattle, and Vancouver.
** Copa Tejas was originally conceived for USL clubs, with an MLS division created in 2021.

=== Non-official ===
All records reflect wins made (per regular season, not per matches) when all participating franchises are MLS teams. No cup/trophy contested.

Derby name	Most wins	Win(s)	Other club(s)	Win(s)	Recent winner
California Clásico	LA Galaxy	17	San Jose Earthquakes	10	San Jose Earthquakes
Canadian Classique	Toronto FC	7	CF Montréal	6	Toronto FC
El Tráfico	Los Angeles FC	4	LA Galaxy	4	LA Galaxy
Hell Is Real derby***	Columbus Crew	6	FC Cincinnati	3	Columbus Crew
MTL v VAN****	Vancouver Whitecaps FC	8	CF Montréal	6	Vancouver Whitecaps FC
POR v SEA†	Portland Timbers	7	Seattle Sounders FC	7	Seattle Sounders FC
POR v VAN†	Portland Timbers	8	Vancouver Whitecaps FC	6	Vancouver Whitecaps FC
SEA v VAN†	Seattle Sounders FC	11	Vancouver Whitecaps FC	4	Vancouver Whitecaps FC
MIA v ORL	Inter Miami CF	4	Orlando City SC	6	Orlando City SC
STL v SKC	St. Louis City SC	2	Sporting Kansas City	1	Sporting Kansas City

*** The Hell Is Real Derby existed prior to FC Cincinnati joining MLS.
**** The Montreal–Vancouver rivalry existed prior to both teams joining MLS.
† The rivalries between the Portland Timbers, Seattle Sounders, and Vancouver Whitecaps have existed in previous teams that are part of their respective legacies, and leagues that have operated prior to MLS.

=== Discontinued ===
Derby name	Most wins	Titles	Other club(s)	Titles	Last winner
Florida Derby*	Miami Fusion	2	Tampa Bay Mutiny	2	Miami (2001)
SuperClasico	LA Galaxy	9	Chivas USA	1	LA Galaxy (2014)

* Florida Derby existed prior to creation of MLS franchises for Tampa Bay and Miami, and after teams left MLS in 2001.

== Rivalry cups ==
Competition	Established	Teams	Series Wins	Years won
Atlantic Cup	1996	D.C. United	15	1996, 1998, 1999, 2002, 2004, 2005, 2006, 2007, 2008, 2009, 2012, 2014, 2016, 2021, 2026
Atlantic Cup	1996	New York Red Bulls	16	1997, 2000, 2001, 2003, 2010, 2011, 2013, 2015, 2017, 2018, 2019, 2020, 2022, 2023, 2024, 2025
Brimstone Cup	2001	Chicago Fire FC	9	2001, 2012, 2013, 2014, 2015, 2017, 2019, 2022, 2025
Brimstone Cup	2001	FC Dallas	12	2002, 2003, 2004, 2005, 2006, 2007, 2008, 2009, 2010, 2011, 2016, 2018
California Clásico	1996	LA Galaxy	18	1996, 1998, 1999, 2000, 2002, 2003, 2004, 2008, 2009, 2011, 2013, 2014, 2016, 2018, 2021, 2023, 2024, 2026
California Clásico	1996	San Jose Earthquakes	10	1997, 2001, 2005, 2010, 2012, 2015, 2017, 2019, 2020, 2025
Cascadia Cup (MLS years)	2011 (Note: The Cascadia Cup was founded in 2004 and contested by clubs outside MLS (in North American Division 2 soccer). 2011 represents the year MLS teams began competition. No Cup was awarded in 2020 by agreement of all 3 teams' supporters' clubs due to the lack of fans present at games due to the Coronavirus.)	Portland Timbers	4	2012, 2017, 2022, 2024
Cascadia Cup (MLS years)	2011	Seattle Sounders FC	5	2011, 2015, 2018, 2019, 2021
Cascadia Cup (MLS years)	2011	Vancouver Whitecaps FC	6	2013, 2014, 2016, 2023, 2025, 2026
Copa Tejas	2021	Austin FC	2	2022, 2023
Copa Tejas	2021	FC Dallas	3	2021, 2024, 2026
Copa Tejas	2021	Houston Dynamo FC	1	2025
El Tráfico	2018	LA Galaxy	4	2018, 2019, 2021, 2025
El Tráfico	2018	Los Angeles FC	4	2020, 2022, 2023, 2024
Florida Derby (MLS years)	1998 (Note: The Florida Derby originated in 1977 and has been contested for most of its history by Division 1 and 2 soccer clubs outside MLS. The years 1998–2001 represent the only era in which MLS teams participated.)	Miami Fusion	2	2000, 2001
Florida Derby (MLS years)	1998	Tampa Bay Mutiny	2	1998, 1999
Hell Is Real derby (MLS years)	2019 (Note: The Hell Is Real Derby was established in 2017 when FC Cincinnati was still a member of the league now known as the USL Championship. 2019 represents the year when the clubs first met as MLS teams.)	Columbus Crew	7	2019, 2020, 2021, 2022, 2023, 2025, 2026
Hell Is Real derby (MLS years)	2019	FC Cincinnati	1	2024
Heritage Cup	2009	San Jose Earthquakes	8	2009, 2012, 2014, 2015, 2020, 2022, 2023, 2024
Heritage Cup	2009	Seattle Sounders FC	10	2010, 2011, 2013, 2016, 2017, 2018, 2019, 2021, 2025, 2026
Hudson River Derby	2015	New York Red Bulls	7	2015, 2016, 2018, 2019, 2021, 2023, 2026
Hudson River Derby	2015	New York City FC	5	2017, 2020, 2022, 2024, 2025
SuperClasico	2005 (Note: The SuperClasico ended in 2014 due to the folding of Chivas USA)	Chivas USA	1	2007
SuperClasico	2005	LA Galaxy	9	2005, 2006, 2008, 2009, 2010, 2011, 2012, 2013, 2014
Lamar Hunt Pioneer Cup	2007	Columbus Crew	11	2007, 2011, 2012, 2013, 2014, 2016, 2017, 2018, 2019, 2020, 2023
Lamar Hunt Pioneer Cup	2007	FC Dallas	2	2010, 2015
Rocky Mountain Cup	2005	Colorado Rapids	8	2005, 2006, 2013, 2015, 2020, 2024, 2025, 2026
Rocky Mountain Cup	2005	Real Salt Lake	14	2007, 2008, 2009, 2010, 2011, 2012, 2014, 2016, 2017, 2018, 2019, 2021, 2022, 2023
Texas Derby	2006	FC Dallas	12	2008, 2010, 2013, 2014, 2015, 2018, 2019, 2020, 2022, 2023, 2024, 2026
Texas Derby	2006	Houston Dynamo FC	9	2006, 2007, 2009, 2011, 2012, 2016, 2017, 2021, 2025
Trillium Cup	2008	Columbus Crew	11	2008, 2009, 2010, 2012, 2013, 2015, 2018, 2022, 2023, 2024, 2026
Trillium Cup	2008	Toronto FC	8	2011, 2014, 2016, 2017, 2019, 2020, 2021, 2025

== See also ==
- Major League Baseball rivalries
- National Basketball Association rivalries
- National Hockey League rivalries
- National Football League rivalries
