= 2020 Major League Soccer season =

25th season of Major League Soccer

Major League Soccer
- MLS's commemorative logo for its 25th season
- Season: 2020
- Dates: February 29 – March 8 (regular season before suspension); July 8 – August 11 (MLS is Back Tournament); August 12 – November 8 (completion of regular season); November 20 – December 12 (playoffs)
- Teams: 26
- MLS Cup: Columbus Crew SC (2nd title)
- Supporters' Shield: Philadelphia Union (1st shield)
- Champions League (United States): Atlanta United FC; Columbus Crew SC; Philadelphia Union; Portland Timbers
- Champions League (Canada): Toronto FC
- Leagues Cup: New York City FC; Orlando City SC; Seattle Sounders FC; Sporting Kansas City
- Matches: 292
- Goals: 826 (2.83 per match)
- Top goalscorer: Diego Rossi (14 goals)
- Best goalkeeper: Joe Willis (9 shutouts)
- Biggest home win: 6 goals: SEA 7–1 SJ (September 10); LAFC 6–0 VAN (September 23)
- Biggest away win: 5 goals: RSL 0–5 COL (September 12); SJ 1–6 POR (September 19)
- Highest scoring: 9 goals: LA 3–6 POR (October 7)
- Longest winning run: 5 games: Portland Timbers (September 19 – October 11); Toronto FC (September 23 – October 11); Columbus Crew SC (November 8 – December 12)
- Longest unbeaten run: 11 games: Orlando City SC (August 26 – October 18)
- Longest winless run: 9 games: D.C. United (September 6 – October 14)
- Longest losing run: 6 games: LA Galaxy (September 19 – October 14)
- Highest attendance: 69,301; ATL 2–1 CIN (March 7)
- Lowest attendance: 0
- Total attendance: 637,020
- Average attendance: 2,182

The 2020 Major League Soccer season was the 25th season of Major League Soccer (MLS), the top professional soccer league in the United States and Canada. The regular season began on February 29, 2020, and was originally planned to end on October 4. The MLS Cup playoffs were planned to begin later that month and would end with MLS Cup 2020 on November 7.

On March 12, 2020, the season entered a lengthy suspension due to the COVID-19 pandemic in North America, following the cancellation of several matches. On May 1, the league announced that players would be allowed to resume individual outdoor training at MLS facilities on May 6. The COVID-19 pandemic was the first interruption of regular season play since the 2001 MLS season, in which many late regular season games were canceled due to the September 11 attacks. On June 10, MLS announced that a bracket format dubbed the "MLS is Back Tournament" would begin July 8 at ESPN Wide World of Sports Complex in Walt Disney World, and end with the final on August 11. The tournament included 51 matches in 35 days and over 1,000 players and staff quarantined to a set of hotels at Walt Disney World; it was eventually won by the Portland Timbers, who as a result earned a berth in the 2021 CONCACAF Champions League. The regular season later resumed a day after the tournament finished, and concluded on November 8. The playoffs began on November 20 with MLS Cup 2020 now being played on December 12.

The 2020 season saw the addition of two expansion clubs, Inter Miami CF and Nashville SC, which took Major League Soccer to 26 total teams. Nashville SC was initially placed in the Western Conference, for a 13–13 team balance, despite Nashville being to the east of the western most Eastern Conference team, Chicago Fire FC. However, after the MLS Is Back Tournament, COVID-19 difficulties led to MLS limiting teams to matches with teams in geographic proximity, and as a result Nashville was moved to the Eastern conference due to geography. This led to an imbalance, with 14 teams in the Eastern Conference and 12 in the Western Conference. Prior to the COVID-19 pandemic, this season was planned to be the first MLS season in which each team did not play every other team at least once, but, due to the pandemic, the schedule was heavily modified and most teams only played other teams within a regional geographic bubble. During the regular season around September and toward the end of the season, COVID-19 cross-border restrictions imposed by the Canadian government forced the Canadian MLS teams to play home matches in the United States.

The Philadelphia Union won the Supporters' Shield on the final day of the regular season, the first major trophy in the club's history. Columbus Crew SC defeated defending champions Seattle Sounders FC in MLS Cup 2020 3–0 to win a second MLS Cup title, and their first since 2008. The league's teams incurred an estimated financial loss of $1 billion due to lost ticket sales and additional costs. The 2020 season was the longest in MLS season, stretching 287 days.

== Teams ==
=== Stadiums and locations ===
Western Conference
Team	Stadium	Capacity
Colorado Rapids	Dick's Sporting Goods Park	18,061
FC Dallas	Toyota Stadium	20,500
Houston Dynamo FC	BBVA Stadium	22,039
LA Galaxy	Dignity Health Sports Park	27,000
Los Angeles FC	Banc of California Stadium	22,000
Minnesota United FC	Allianz Field	19,400
Portland Timbers	Providence Park	25,218
Real Salt Lake	Rio Tinto Stadium	20,213
San Jose Earthquakes	Earthquakes Stadium	18,000
Seattle Sounders FC	Lumen Field	37,722
Sporting Kansas City	Children's Mercy Park	18,467
Vancouver Whitecaps FC	BC Place / Providence Park	22,120 / 25,218

Eastern Conference
Team	Stadium	Capacity
Atlanta United FC	Mercedes-Benz Stadium	71,000
Chicago Fire FC	Soldier Field	24,955
FC Cincinnati	TQL Stadium	26,000
Columbus Crew SC	Mapfre Stadium	19,968
D.C. United	Audi Field	20,000
Inter Miami CF	Inter Miami CF Stadium	18,000
Montreal Impact	Saputo Stadium / Olympic Stadium / Red Bull Arena	19,619 / 61,004 / 25,000
Nashville SC	Nissan Stadium	60,000
New England Revolution	Gillette Stadium	20,000
New York City FC	Yankee Stadium / Red Bull Arena	30,321 / 25,000
New York Red Bulls	Red Bull Arena	25,000
Orlando City SC	Exploria Stadium	25,500
Philadelphia Union	Subaru Park	18,500
Toronto FC	BMO Field / Pratt & Whitney Stadium	28,351 / 38,066

Locations of teams for the 2020 Major League Soccer season
Western Conference Eastern Conference

1. Non-soccer specific stadium and artificially reduced capacity.
2. Temporary stadium.

Two stadiums were renamed during the 2019–20 offseason:

- Avaya Stadium, home to the San Jose Earthquakes, was renamed Earthquakes Stadium on January 11, 2020. The team was unable to find a new naming rights partner after original stadium sponsor Avaya filed for bankruptcy.
- Talen Energy Stadium, home to the Philadelphia Union, was renamed Subaru Park on February 18. The Union's 2010 naming rights contract with PPL, which was inherited in 2015 by the PPL spinoff Talen Energy, expired after the 2019 season, and Subaru of America, the U.S. subsidiary of Japanese automaker Subaru, was announced as the new partner also on February 18.

An additional stadium was renamed prior to the 2020 postseason:

- CenturyLink Field, home to Seattle Sounders FC, was renamed to Lumen Field on November 19. The telecommunications company had changed its name from CenturyLink to Lumen Technologies the prior September.

Expansion team Nashville SC began the season in the MLS Western Conference. As part of the announcement of the MLS is Back Tournament, MLS confirmed that for one season only, Nashville would transfer to the MLS Eastern Conference which thereby expanded to 14 teams for the season, with the Western Conference reduced to 12. Due to travel restrictions between US and Canada the three Canadian teams were relocated to temporary stadiums in the United States starting September 20.

=== Personnel and sponsorship ===
Note: All teams use Adidas as kit manufacturer.

For the 2020 season, MLS allowed teams to sign sleeve sponsorship agreements for the left jersey sleeve; beginning with the MLS is Back Tournament, this was extended to both sleeves and club shorts in certain circumstances.

Team	Head coach	Captain	Shirt sponsor	Sleeve and short sponsor
Atlanta United FC	(Scotland) Stephen Glass (interim)	(United States) Jeff Larentowicz	American Family Insurance	Piedmont Orthopedics, Truist, NAPA
Chicago Fire FC	(Switzerland) Raphaël Wicky	(Costa Rica) Francisco Calvo	Motorola	Motorola, CIBC
FC Cincinnati	(Netherlands) Jaap Stam	(Costa Rica) Kendall Waston	Mercy Health	Cintas, First Financial Bank
Colorado Rapids	(United States) Robin Fraser	(England) Jack Price	Transamerica	WFG, Western Union
Columbus Crew SC	(United States) Caleb Porter	(Ghana) Jonathan Mensah	Nationwide Children's Hospital	Scotts, OhioHealth
D.C. United	(United States) Chad Ashton (interim)	(United States) Steve Birnbaum	Leidos	Caesars Entertainment, Gainbridge, Events DC, EagleBank
FC Dallas	(United States) Luchi Gonzalez	(Switzerland) Reto Ziegler	AdvoCare	AdvoCare
Houston Dynamo FC	(United States) Tab Ramos	(Honduras) Boniek García	MD Anderson	Kroger, Coushatta Casino Resort
Inter Miami CF	(Uruguay) Diego Alonso	(United States) Luis Robles	—	Baptist Health
LA Galaxy	(United States) Dominic Kinnear (interim)	(Mexico) Jonathan dos Santos	Herbalife	Herbalife, Dignity Health
Los Angeles FC	(United States) Bob Bradley	(Mexico) Carlos Vela	YouTube TV	Target
Minnesota United FC	(England) Adrian Heath	(Cuba) Osvaldo Alonso	Target	Bell Bank, Allianz
Montreal Impact	(France) Thierry Henry	(Finland) Jukka Raitala	Bank of Montreal	Saputo
Nashville SC	(England) Gary Smith	(United States) Dax McCarty	Renasant Bank	Hyundai, Jackson
New England Revolution	(United States) Bruce Arena	(Spain) Carles Gil	UnitedHealth	Gillette, Santander
New York City FC	(Norway) Ronny Deila	(Finland) Alexander Ring	Etihad Airways	AT&T, Ford
New York Red Bulls	(Austria) Gerhard Struber	(United States) Sean Davis	Red Bull	Yanmar
Orlando City SC	(Colombia) Óscar Pareja	(Portugal) Nani	Orlando Health	Exploria
Philadelphia Union	(United States) Jim Curtin	(United States) Alejandro Bedoya	Bimbo Bakeries USA	Thomas', Subaru
Portland Timbers	(Venezuela) Giovanni Savarese	(Argentina) Diego Valeri	Alaska Airlines	KeyBank, AT&T
Real Salt Lake	(United States) Freddy Juarez	(United States) Kyle Beckerman	LifeVantage	KeyBank, Ford
San Jose Earthquakes	(Argentina) Matías Almeyda	(United States) Chris Wondolowski	Intermedia	Clover, Wells Fargo
Seattle Sounders FC	(United States) Brian Schmetzer	(Uruguay) Nicolás Lodeiro	Zulily	WaFd Bank
Sporting Kansas City	(United States) Peter Vermes	(United States) Matt Besler	Ivy Funds	Compass Minerals
Toronto FC	(United States) Greg Vanney	(United States) Michael Bradley	Bank of Montreal	GE Appliances, Bank of Montreal
Vancouver Whitecaps FC	(Canada) Marc Dos Santos	(Canada) Russell Teibert	Bell Canada	GE Appliances

=== Coaching changes ===
Team	Outgoing coach	Manner of departure	Date of vacancy	Position in table	Incoming coach	Date of appointment
Orlando City SC	(Republic of Ireland) James O'Connor	Fired	October 7, 2019	Pre-season	(Colombia) Óscar Pareja	December 4, 2019
Houston Dynamo FC	(United States) Davy Arnaud	End of interim period	October 24, 2019	Pre-season	(United States) Tab Ramos	October 25, 2019
Montreal Impact	(Colombia) Wílmer Cabrera	Contract expired	October 24, 2019	Pre-season	(France) Thierry Henry	November 14, 2019
New York City FC	(Spain) Domènec Torrent	Mutual consent	November 8, 2019	Pre-season	(Norway) Ronny Deila	January 6, 2020
Chicago Fire FC	(Serbia) Veljko Paunović	Fired	November 13, 2019	Pre-season	(Switzerland) Raphaël Wicky	December 27, 2019
FC Cincinnati	(Netherlands) Ron Jans	Resigned	February 18, 2020	Pre-season	(France) Yoann Damet (interim)	February 18, 2020
FC Cincinnati	(France) Yoann Damet	End of interim period	May 21, 2020	11th in East, 23rd overall	(Netherlands) Jaap Stam	May 21, 2020
Atlanta United FC	(Netherlands) Frank de Boer	Fired	July 24, 2020	7th in East, 14th overall	(Scotland) Stephen Glass (interim)	July 27, 2020
New York Red Bulls	(United States) Chris Armas	Fired	September 4, 2020	7th in East, 12th overall	(South Africa) Bradley Carnell (interim)	September 5, 2020
New York Red Bulls	(South Africa) Bradley Carnell	End of interim period	October 6, 2020	7th in East, 12th overall	(Austria) Gerhard Struber	October 6, 2020
D.C. United	(United States) Ben Olsen	Fired	October 8, 2020	14th in East, 26th overall	(United States) Chad Ashton (interim)	October 8, 2020
LA Galaxy	(Argentina) Guillermo Barros Schelotto	Fired	October 29, 2020	12th in West, 24th overall	(United States) Dominic Kinnear (interim)	October 29, 2020

== Regular season ==
=== Format ===
The 2020 regular season began on February 29, 2020, and was originally scheduled to conclude on October 4. The league was originally divided into two conferences of 13 teams, with each playing a 34-game schedule with 17 each of home and away matches. Each team would play their intra-conference opponents twice – once home and once away for a total of 24 matches – and one match against 10 of the members of the opposite conference. The 2020 season was the first MLS season in which each team did not play every other team at least once. Only two weeks of the original format were played before the COVID-19 pandemic put the season on hold.

The MLS is Back Tournament introduced three regular season matches in the group stage and the knockout stage that did not count towards regular season standings. After the tournament, the "first phase" of the regular schedule restart had teams playing in their home markets against only conference opponents for six matches with the intent of finishing a 23-match season. Some teams were allowed to play in front of a limited audience of spectators. The exceptions in the first phase were that the Canadian clubs would play six matches between themselves due to prohibited travel to the United States and that FC Dallas and Nashville SC would play an additional three matches between themselves to make up for the fact that they could not play in the MLS is Back Tournament.

On September 11, the league announced the "second phase" of the restart with three more matches for each team. In this phase, Canadian and U.S. teams once again played each other but only within their own geographic bubble. This phase included two away games and one (designated home) game at a neutral venue for each of the Canadian teams; with Vancouver, Montreal, and Toronto hosting matches in Portland, Harrison, and Hartford, respectively.

On October 17, following a decision by the ISC (Independent Supporters Council), it was announced that the Supporters' Shield would not be awarded to the best regular season team in 2020. In an official announcement, the Supporters' Shield Foundation stated, "After much consideration and discussion, the Supporters' Shield Foundation has decided to forego awarding the Supporters' Shield for the 2020 season. This is not an easy decision to make. With the inability for supporters to be in attendance and fill their stadiums with passion, however, we feel as though the current climate goes against the spirit of the Shield." However, following backlash from members across the MLS community, on October 23 the foundation reversed the decision and reinstated the Shield.

On October 29, the league announced that the final regular season standings and playoff qualification would be determined by points per game rather than by overall points. This was due to eight MLS clubs, all in the Western Conference, being unable to play all of their scheduled 23 regular season matches in time due to the COVID-19 pandemic. Seven postponed matches were cancelled altogether in order for the playoffs to be able to start on the scheduled date.

The regular season concluded with Decision Day on November 8, after which an expanded 18-team playoff began on November 20 and concluded with MLS Cup 2020 on December 12. Eight teams from the Western Conference and six teams from the Eastern Conference automatically qualified for the playoffs; teams finishing in positions 7–10 in the Eastern Conference competed in a play-in round for the final two first round playoff spots.

=== Conference standings ===
==== Eastern Conference ====
Pos	Team	Pld	W	L	T	GF	GA	GD	Pts	PPG	
1	Philadelphia Union	23	14	4	5	44	20	+24	47	2.04	Qualification for the first round and the CONCACAF Champions League (Note: As Supporters' Shield winners)
2	Toronto FC (Note: Canadian clubs could not qualify for the 2021 CONCACAF Champions League through the MLS regular season or playoffs.)	23	13	5	5	33	26	+7	44	1.91	Qualification for the first round and the CONCACAF Champions League (Note: As 2020 Canadian Championship finalists (awarded by Canada Soccer))
3	Columbus Crew SC (C)	23	12	6	5	36	21	+15	41	1.78	Qualification for the first round and the CONCACAF Champions League (Note: As MLS Cup 2020 champions)
4	Orlando City SC	23	11	4	8	40	25	+15	41	1.78	Qualification for the first round and the Leagues Cup
5	New York City FC	23	12	8	3	37	25	+12	39	1.70	Qualification for the first round and the Leagues Cup
6	New York Red Bulls	23	9	9	5	29	31	−2	32	1.39	Qualification for the first round
7	Nashville SC (Note: On June 10, 2020, Major League Soccer announced that Nashville SC would switch from the Western Conference to the Eastern Conference for the remainder of the 2020 season.)	23	8	7	8	24	22	+2	32	1.39	Qualification for the play-in round
8	New England Revolution	23	8	7	8	26	25	+1	32	1.39	Qualification for the play-in round
9	Montreal Impact	23	8	13	2	33	43	−10	26	1.13	Qualification for the play-in round
10	Inter Miami CF	23	7	13	3	25	35	−10	24	1.04	Qualification for the play-in round
11	Chicago Fire FC	23	5	10	8	33	39	−6	23	1.00	
12	Atlanta United FC	23	6	13	4	23	30	−7	22	0.96	Qualification for the CONCACAF Champions League (Note: As 2019 U.S. Open Cup winners)
13	D.C. United	23	5	12	6	25	41	−16	21	0.91	
14	FC Cincinnati	23	4	15	4	12	36	−24	16	0.70	

Source: MLS
Rules for classification: 1) points per game; 2) total wins per match played; 3) total goal differential per match played; 4) total goals scored per match played; 5) fewest disciplinary points per match played; 6) away goal differential per away match played; 7) away goals scored per away match played; 8) home goal differential per home match played; 9) home goals scored per home match played; 10) coin toss or drawing of lots.
(C) Champions

==== Western Conference ====
Pos	Team	Pld	W	L	T	GF	GA	GD	Pts	PPG	Qualification
1	Sporting Kansas City	21	12	6	3	38	25	+13	39	1.86	Qualification for the first round and the Leagues Cup
2	Seattle Sounders FC	22	11	5	6	44	23	+21	39	1.77	Qualification for the first round and the Leagues Cup
3	Portland Timbers	23	11	6	6	46	35	+11	39	1.70	Qualification for the first round and the CONCACAF Champions League (Note: As MLS is Back Tournament winners)
4	Minnesota United FC	21	9	5	7	36	26	+10	34	1.62	Qualification for the first round
5	Colorado Rapids	18	8	6	4	32	28	+4	28	1.56	Qualification for the first round
6	FC Dallas	22	9	6	7	28	24	+4	34	1.55	Qualification for the first round
7	Los Angeles FC	22	9	8	5	47	39	+8	32	1.45	Qualification for the first round
8	San Jose Earthquakes	23	8	9	6	35	51	−16	30	1.30	Qualification for the first round
9	Vancouver Whitecaps FC (Note: Canadian clubs could not qualify for the 2021 CONCACAF Champions League through the MLS regular season or playoffs.)	23	9	14	0	27	44	−17	27	1.17	
10	LA Galaxy	22	6	12	4	27	46	−19	22	1.00	
11	Real Salt Lake	22	5	10	7	25	35	−10	22	1.00	
12	Houston Dynamo	23	4	10	9	30	40	−10	21	0.91	

Source: MLS
Rules for classification: 1) points per game; 2) total wins per match played; 3) total goal differential per match played; 4) total goals scored per match played; 5) fewest disciplinary points per match played; 6) away goal differential per away match played; 7) away goals scored per away match played; 8) home goal differential per home match played; 9) home goals scored per home match played; 10) coin toss or drawing of lots.

=== Overall table ===
The leading team in this table wins the Supporters' Shield.

2020 MLS overall standings
Pos	Team	Pld	W	L	T	GF	GA	GD	Pts	PPG	
1	Philadelphia Union (S)	23	14	4	5	44	20	+24	47	2.04	Qualification for the CONCACAF Champions League (Note: As Supporters' Shield winners (USA2))
2	Toronto FC (V)	23	13	5	5	33	26	+7	44	1.91	Qualification for the CONCACAF Champions League (Note: As 2020 Canadian Championship finalists (awarded by Canada Soccer) (CAN1))
3	Sporting Kansas City	21	12	6	3	38	25	+13	39	1.86	Qualification for the Leagues Cup (Note: As first place in Western Conference (MLS1))
4	Columbus Crew SC (C)	23	12	6	5	36	21	+15	41	1.78	Qualification for the CONCACAF Champions League (Note: As MLS Cup 2020 champions (USA1))
5	Orlando City SC	23	11	4	8	40	25	+15	41	1.78	Qualification for the Leagues Cup (Note: As fourth place in Eastern Conference (MLS2))
6	Seattle Sounders FC	22	11	5	6	44	23	+21	39	1.77	Qualification for the Leagues Cup (Note: As second place in Western Conference (MLS3))
7	New York City FC	23	12	8	3	37	25	+12	39	1.70	Qualification for the Leagues Cup (Note: As fifth place in Eastern Conference (MLS4))
8	Portland Timbers (M)	23	11	6	6	46	35	+11	39	1.70	Qualification for the CONCACAF Champions League (Note: As MLS is Back Tournament winners (USA3))
9	Minnesota United FC	21	9	5	7	36	26	+10	34	1.62	
10	Colorado Rapids	18	8	6	4	32	28	+4	28	1.56	
11	FC Dallas	22	9	6	7	28	24	+4	34	1.55	
12	Los Angeles FC	22	9	8	5	47	39	+8	32	1.45	
13	New York Red Bulls	23	9	9	5	29	31	−2	32	1.39	
14	Nashville SC	23	8	7	8	24	22	+2	32	1.39	
15	New England Revolution	23	8	7	8	26	25	+1	32	1.39	
16	San Jose Earthquakes	23	8	9	6	35	51	−16	30	1.30	
17	Vancouver Whitecaps FC	23	9	14	0	27	44	−17	27	1.17	
18	Montreal Impact	23	8	13	2	33	43	−10	26	1.13	
19	Inter Miami CF	23	7	13	3	25	35	−10	24	1.04	
20	LA Galaxy	22	6	12	4	27	46	−19	22	1.00	
21	Real Salt Lake	22	5	10	7	25	35	−10	22	1.00	
22	Chicago Fire FC	23	5	10	8	33	39	−6	23	1.00	
23	Atlanta United FC (U)	23	6	13	4	23	30	−7	22	0.96	Qualification for the CONCACAF Champions League (Note: As 2019 U.S. Open Cup winners (USA4))
24	D.C. United	23	5	12	6	25	41	−16	21	0.91	
25	Houston Dynamo	23	4	10	9	30	40	−10	21	0.91	
26	FC Cincinnati	23	4	15	4	12	36	−24	16	0.70	

Source: MLS
Rules for classification: 1) points per game; 2) total wins per match played; 3) total goal differential per match played; 4) total goals scored per match played; 5) fewest disciplinary points per match played; 6) away goal differential per away match played; 7) away goals scored per away match played; 8) home goal differential per home match played; 9) home goals scored per home match played; 10) coin toss or drawing of lots.
(C) Champions; (M) MLS is Back Tournament champions; (S) Supporters' Shield winners; (U) U.S. Open Cup winners; (V) Canadian Championship finalists

=== Fixtures and results ===
Color key: Home • Away • Neutral • Win • Loss • Draw • Canceled
Club	Match																						
Club	1	2	3	4	5	6	7	8	9	10	11	12	13	14	15	16	17	18	19	20	21	22	23
Atlanta United FC (ATL)	NSH	CIN	NY	CIN	CLB	NSH	ORL	MIA	ORL	MIA	NSH	MIA	DAL	CHI	DC	ORL	NY	MIA	TOR	DC	ORL	CIN	CLB
Atlanta United FC (ATL)	2–1	2–1	0–1	0–1	0–1	2–0	1–3	0–0	1–1	1–2	2–4	1–2	1–0	0–2	4–0	0–0	0–1	1–1	0–1	1–2	1–4	2–0	1–2
Chicago Fire FC (CHI)	SEA	NE	SEA	SJ	VAN	CLB	CIN	NYC	CIN	NE	CLB	ORL	HOU	ATL	MTL	SKC	DC	SKC	NY	PHI	NSH	MIN	NYC
Chicago Fire FC (CHI)	1–2	1–1	2–1	0–2	0–2	0–3	3–0	1–3	0–0	1–2	2–2	1–4	4–0	2–0	2–2	0–1	2–1	2–2	2–2	1–2	1–1	2–2	3–4
FC Cincinnati (CIN)	NY	ATL	CLB	ATL	NY	DC	CHI	CLB	CHI	CLB	NYC	NY	PHI	NYC	MIN	PHI	TOR	CLB	DC	MIN	SKC	ATL	MIA
FC Cincinnati (CIN)	2–3	1–2	0–4	1–0	2–0	0–0	0–3	0–0	0–0	0–3	1–2	1–0	0–0	0–4	0–2	0–3	0–1	2–1	1–2	0–1	0–1	0–2	1–2
Colorado Rapids (COL)	DC	ORL	RSL	SKC	MIN	RSL	SKC	SJ	HOU	RSL	DAL	LA	SJ	LFC	LA	SEA	RSL	SKC	SKC	MIN	SEA	POR	HOU
Colorado Rapids (COL)	2–1	2–1	0–2	2–3	2–2	1–4	1–1	1–1	1–1	5–0	1–4	2–0	5–0	CAN	CAN	CAN	CAN	CAN	0–4	1–2	3–1	1–0	2–1
Columbus Crew SC (CLB)	NYC	SEA	CIN	NY	ATL	CHI	NYC	CIN	PHI	CIN	CHI	NSH	MIN	TOR	DAL	MTL	CIN	NYC	HOU	DC	PHI	ORL	ATL
Columbus Crew SC (CLB)	1–0	1–1	4–0	2–0	1–0	3–0	0–1	0–0	1–0	3–0	2–2	2–0	2–1	1–3	2–2	1–2	1–2	3–1	1–1	0–1	2–1	1–2	2–1
FC Dallas (DAL)	PHI	MTL	NSH	NSH	HOU	MIN	SKC	MIN	HOU	COL	SKC	ATL	ORL	CLB	HOU	MIN	SKC	NSH	RSL	MIA	HOU	NSH	MIN
FC Dallas (DAL)	2–0	2–2	0–1	0–0	0–0	3–1	1–1	2–3	2–1	4–1	3–2	0–1	0–0	2–2	0–2	CAN	1–0	0–3	0–0	2–1	3–0	1–0	0–3
D.C. United (DC)	COL	MIA	TOR	NE	MTL	CIN	NE	PHI	NY	NYC	NY	TOR	NSH	NE	ATL	NYC	CHI	PHI	CIN	ATL	CLB	NE	MTL
D.C. United (DC)	1–2	2–1	2–2	1–1	0–1	0–0	1–2	1–4	1–0	0–0	0–2	2–2	0–1	0–2	0–4	1–4	1–2	2–2	2–1	2–1	1–0	3–4	2–3
Houston Dynamo FC (HOU)	LA	SKC	LFC	POR	LA	DAL	SKC	MIN	SKC	COL	DAL	MIN	CHI	NSH	SKC	DAL	MIA	NSH	MIN	CLB	LFC	DAL	COL
Houston Dynamo FC (HOU)	1–1	0–4	3–3	1–2	1–1	0–0	5–2	3–0	2–1	1–1	1–2	2–2	0–4	1–1	1–2	2–0	0–1	1–3	2–2	1–1	1–2	0–3	1–2
Los Angeles FC (LFC)	MIA	PHI	HOU	LA	POR	LA	SEA	SJ	LA	RSL	POR	SEA	VAN	SJ	RSL	COL	SEA	VAN	POR	LA	HOU	SJ	POR
Los Angeles FC (LFC)	1–0	3–3	3–3	6–2	2–2	0–2	1–3	5–1	0–3	0–3	4–2	0–3	6–0	1–2	3–1	CAN	3–1	1–2	1–1	2–0	2–1	2–3	1–1
LA Galaxy (LA)	HOU	VAN	POR	LFC	HOU	LFC	SJ	POR	LFC	SJ	COL	RSL	SEA	SJ	POR	COL	SJ	VAN	LFC	POR	RSL	SEA	VAN
LA Galaxy (LA)	1–1	0–1	1–2	2–6	1–1	2–0	3–2	3–2	3–0	0–0	0–2	0–2	1–3	1–2	3–6	CAN	0–4	1–0	0–2	2–5	2–1	1–1	0–3
Inter Miami CF (MIA)	LFC	DC	ORL	PHI	NYC	ORL	NSH	ATL	NSH	ATL	ORL	ATL	NY	PHI	NYC	NY	HOU	ATL	MTL	ORL	DAL	TOR	CIN
Inter Miami CF (MIA)	0–1	1–2	1–2	1–2	0–1	3–2	0–1	0–0	0–0	2–1	1–2	2–1	1–4	0–3	2–3	2–1	1–0	1–1	1–2	2–1	1–2	1–2	2–1
Minnesota United FC (MIN)	POR	SJ	SKC	RSL	COL	SKC	DAL	HOU	RSL	DAL	SKC	HOU	CLB	RSL	CIN	NSH	DAL	HOU	CIN	COL	SKC	CHI	DAL
Minnesota United FC (MIN)	3–1	5–2	2–1	0–0	2–2	1–2	1–3	0–3	4–0	3–2	0–1	2–2	1–2	0–0	2–0	0–0	CAN	2–2	1–0	2–1	CAN	2–2	3–0
Montreal Impact (MTL)	NE	DAL	NE	TOR	DC	VAN	TOR	TOR	TOR	VAN	VAN	PHI	NE	NY	CHI	CLB	PHI	NE	MIA	NYC	NSH	ORL	DC
Montreal Impact (MTL)	2–1	2–2	0–1	3–4	1–0	2–0	0–1	1–0	1–2	4–2	1–3	1–4	1–3	1–4	2–2	2–1	1–2	2–3	2–1	1–3	0–1	0–1	3–2
Nashville SC (NSH)	ATL	POR	DAL	DAL	ATL	ORL	MIA	ORL	MIA	ATL	CLB	DC	HOU	NE	MIN	SKC	HOU	DAL	NE	MTL	CHI	DAL	ORL
Nashville SC (NSH)	1–2	0–1	1–0	0–0	0–2	1–3	1–0	1–1	0–0	4–2	0–2	1–0	1–1	0–0	0–0	1–2	3–1	3–0	1–1	1–0	1–1	0–1	3–2
New England Revolution (NE)	MTL	CHI	MTL	DC	TOR	PHI	DC	NY	NYC	CHI	PHI	NYC	MTL	DC	NSH	TOR	NYC	MTL	PHI	NSH	NY	DC	PHI
New England Revolution (NE)	1–2	1–1	1–0	1–1	0–0	0–0	2–1	1–1	0–2	2–1	1–2	0–0	3–1	2–0	0–0	0–1	2–1	3–2	1–2	1–1	0–1	4–3	0–2
New York City FC (NYC)	CLB	TOR	PHI	ORL	MIA	NY	CLB	CHI	NE	DC	CIN	NE	TOR	CIN	MIA	DC	NE	ORL	CLB	MTL	TOR	NY	CHI
New York City FC (NYC)	0–1	0–1	0–1	1–3	1–0	0–1	1–0	3–1	2–0	0–0	2–1	0–0	0–1	4–0	3–2	4–1	1–2	1–1	1–3	3–1	1–0	5−2	4–3
New York Red Bulls (NY)	CIN	RSL	ATL	CLB	CIN	NYC	PHI	NE	DC	PHI	DC	CIN	MIA	MTL	ORL	MIA	ATL	TOR	ORL	CHI	NE	NYC	TOR
New York Red Bulls (NY)	3–2	1–1	1–0	0–2	0–2	1–0	0–1	1–1	0–1	0–3	2–0	0–1	4–1	4–1	1–3	1–2	1–0	1–1	1–1	2–2	1–0	2–5	2–1
Orlando City SC (ORL)	RSL	COL	MIA	NYC	PHI	MIA	NSH	ATL	NSH	ATL	MIA	CHI	SKC	DAL	NY	ATL	NYC	NY	MIA	ATL	MTL	CLB	NSH
Orlando City SC (ORL)	0–0	1–2	2–1	3–1	1–1	2–3	3–1	3–1	1–1	1–1	2–1	4–1	2–1	0–0	3–1	0–0	1–1	1–1	1–2	4–1	1–0	2–1	2–3
Philadelphia Union (PHI)	DAL	LFC	NYC	MIA	ORL	NE	NY	DC	CLB	NY	NE	MTL	CIN	MIA	TOR	CIN	MTL	DC	NE	TOR	CHI	CLB	NE
Philadelphia Union (PHI)	0–2	3–3	1–0	2–1	1–1	0–0	1–0	4–1	0–1	3–0	2–1	4–1	0–0	3–0	1–2	3–0	2–1	2–2	2–1	5–0	2–1	1–2	2–0
Portland Timbers (POR)	MIN	NSH	LA	HOU	LFC	SEA	RSL	LA	SEA	LFC	SJ	SJ	SEA	VAN	LA	SJ	RSL	LFC	SEA	LA	VAN	COL	LFC
Portland Timbers (POR)	1–3	1–0	2–1	2–1	2–2	0–3	4–4	2–3	2–1	2–4	1–1	6–1	1–0	1–0	6–3	3–0	1–2	1–1	1–1	5–2	1–0	0–1	1–1
Real Salt Lake (RSL)	ORL	NY	COL	MIN	SKC	COL	POR	SEA	MIN	LFC	COL	VAN	LA	MIN	LFC	SEA	VAN	POR	COL	DAL	SJ	LA	SKC
Real Salt Lake (RSL)	0–0	1–1	2–0	0–0	0–2	4–1	4–4	2–2	0–4	3–0	0–5	1–2	2–0	0–0	1–3	1–2	1–2	2–1	CAN	0–0	0–2	1–2	0–2
San Jose Earthquakes (SJ)	TOR	MIN	SEA	VAN	CHI	LA	LFC	COL	SEA	LA	POR	POR	COL	LFC	LA	VAN	POR	LA	SEA	VAN	RSL	LFC	SEA
San Jose Earthquakes (SJ)	2–2	2–5	0–0	4–3	2–0	2–3	1–5	1–1	1–7	0–0	1–1	1–6	0–5	2–1	2–1	3–0	0–3	4–0	0–0	1–2	2–0	3–2	1–4
Seattle Sounders FC (SEA)	CHI	CLB	SJ	CHI	VAN	POR	LFC	RSL	POR	SJ	LFC	POR	LA	VAN	RSL	LFC	COL	SJ	POR	VAN	COL	LA	SJ
Seattle Sounders FC (SEA)	2–1	1–1	0–0	1–2	3–0	3–0	3–1	2–2	1–2	7–1	3–0	0–1	3–1	3–1	2–1	1–3	CAN	0–0	1–1	2–0	1–3	1–1	4–1
Sporting Kansas City (SKC)	VAN	HOU	MIN	COL	RSL	MIN	HOU	DAL	HOU	MIN	DAL	ORL	COL	HOU	CHI	NSH	DAL	CHI	COL	COL	CIN	MIN	RSL
Sporting Kansas City (SKC)	3–1	4–0	1–2	3–2	2–0	2–1	2–5	1–1	1–1	1–2	1–0	2–3	1–2	2–1	1–0	2–1	0–1	2–2	CAN	4–0	1–0	CAN	2–0
Toronto FC (TOR)	SJ	NYC	DC	MTL	NE	VAN	VAN	MTL	MTL	VAN	MTL	DC	NYC	CLB	PHI	NE	CIN	NY	ATL	PHI	NYC	MIA	NY
Toronto FC (TOR)	2–2	1–0	2–2	4–3	0–0	3–0	1–0	1–0	0–1	2–3	2–1	2–2	1–0	3–1	2–1	1–0	1–0	1–1	1–0	0–5	0–1	2–1	1–2
Vancouver Whitecaps FC (VAN)	SKC	LA	SJ	SEA	CHI	TOR	TOR	MTL	TOR	MTL	MTL	RSL	LFC	POR	SEA	SJ	RSL	LFC	LA	SJ	SEA	POR	LA
Vancouver Whitecaps FC (VAN)	1–3	1–0	3–4	0–3	2–0	0–3	0–1	0–2	3–2	2–4	3–1	2–1	0–6	0–1	1–3	0–3	2–1	2–1	0–1	2–1	0–2	0–1	3–0

== MLS Cup playoffs ==
=== Bracket ===
First round November 21–22, 24	Conference semifinals November 29, December 1–3
E1	Philadelphia Union	0
E8	New England Revolution	2
E8	New England Revolution	3
E4	Orlando City SC	1
E4	Orlando City SC (p)	1 (6)
E5	New York City FC	1 (5)
Eastern Conference
E3	Columbus Crew SC	3
E6	New York Red Bulls	2
E3	Columbus Crew SC (a.e.t.)	2
E7	Nashville SC	0
E2	Toronto FC	0
E7	Nashville SC (a.e.t.)	1
W1	Sporting Kansas City (p)	3 (3)
W8	San Jose Earthquakes	3 (0)
W1	Sporting Kansas City	0
W4	Minnesota United FC	3
W4	Minnesota United FC	3
W5	Colorado Rapids	0
Western Conference
W3	Portland Timbers	1 (7)
W6	FC Dallas (p)	1 (8)
W6	FC Dallas	0
W2	Seattle Sounders FC	1
W2	Seattle Sounders FC	3
W7	Los Angeles FC	1

Conference finals December 6–7
E8	New England Revolution	0
E3	Columbus Crew SC	1
W4	Minnesota United FC	2
W2	Seattle Sounders FC	3

MLS Cup; December 12
E3	Columbus Crew SC	3
W2	Seattle Sounders FC	0

Note: The higher-seeded team hosted matches in the first three rounds. The team with the better regular season record hosted the final.
Source: 2020 MLS Cup Playoffs Bracket

=== MLS Cup ===
December 12, 2020
8:30 PM EST

Columbus Crew SC	3–0	Seattle Sounders FC
Zelarayán 25', 82'; Etienne 31'	Report

Mapfre Stadium, Columbus, Ohio
Attendance: 1,500
Referee: Jair Marrufo

== Attendance ==
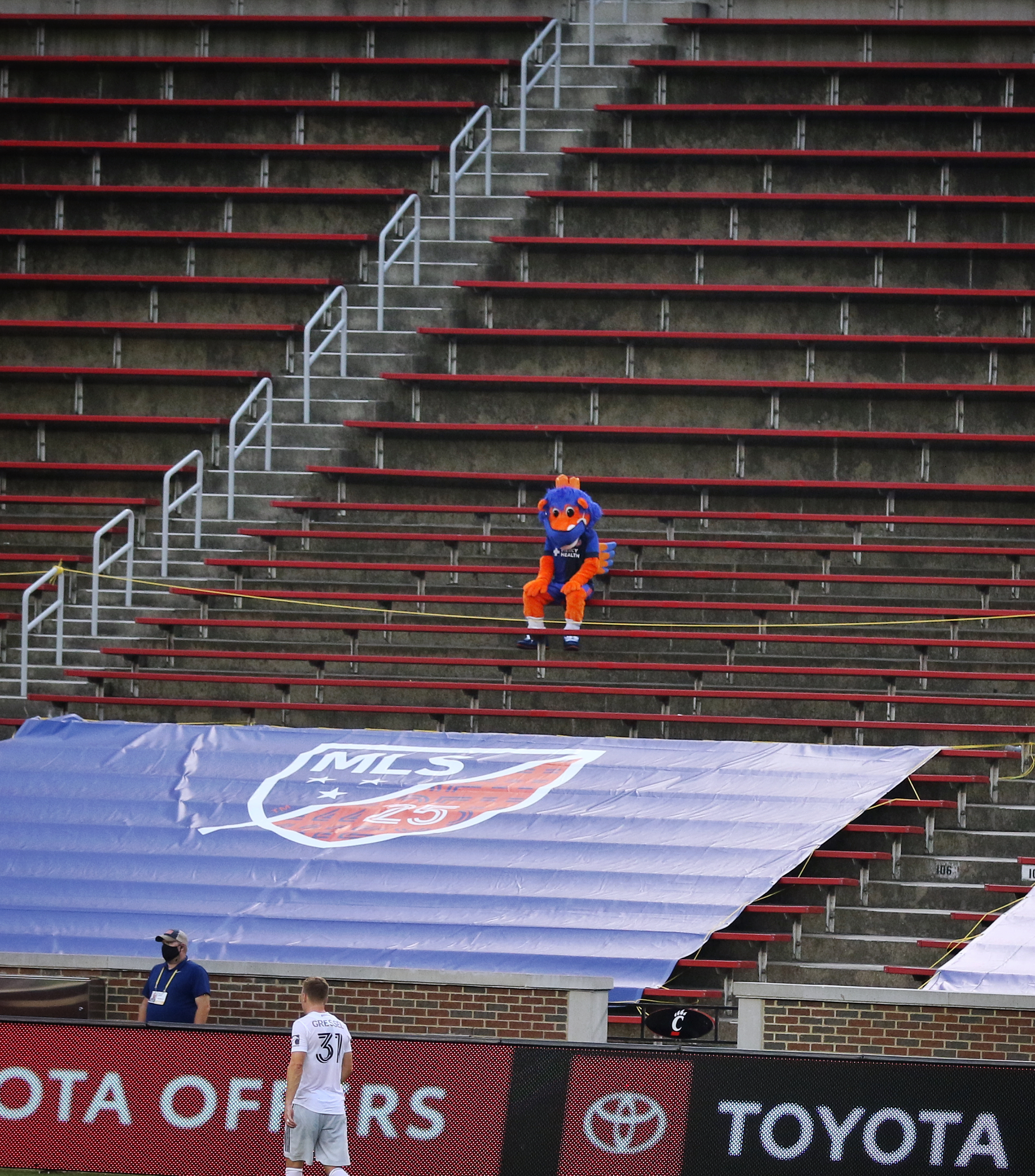
No fans were allowed into FC Cincinnati's Nippert Stadium during 2020 home matches.

Due to the pandemic, some games early in the season were played with low attendance, and games later in the season were played without fans, or with artificially reduced attendance. Individual teams could set their own attendance limits based on their local, regional and state regulations during the pandemic.

=== Average home attendances ===
As of November 8, 2020

Games without fans are not counted in averages or games played.

Pos.	Team	GP	Cumulative	High	Low	Mean
1	Atlanta United FC	3	81,580	69,301	6,130	27,193
2	Nashville SC	6	77,552	59,069	3,478	12,925
3	Seattle Sounders FC	2	73,206	40,126	33,080	36,603
4	FC Dallas	10	55,274	16,219	222	5,527
5	Portland Timbers	2	50,736	25,518	25,218	25,368
6	Real Salt Lake	9	48,012	18,093	2,770	5,335
7	Los Angeles FC	2	44,233	22,121	22,112	22,117
8	D.C. United	2	34,115	17,183	16,932	17,058
9	Houston Dynamo FC	7	34,003	22,039	1,328	4,858
10	San Jose Earthquakes	2	30,223	18,000	12,223	15,112
11	Orlando City SC	2	28,530	25,527	3,003	14,265
12	Toronto FC	2	27,565	26,171	1,394	13,783
13	LA Galaxy	1	26,382	26,382	26,382	26,382
14	Columbus Crew SC	7	26,329	17,473	1,500	3,761
15	Vancouver Whitecaps FC	1	22,120	22,120	22,120	22,120
16	Montreal Impact	4	21,506	21,006	250	5,439
17	Sporting Kansas City	1	21,188	21,188	21,188	21,188
18	New York Red Bulls	1	15,703	15,703	15,703	15,703
19	New England Revolution	1	15,289	15,289	15,289	15,289
20	Colorado Rapids	1	13,062	13,062	13,062	13,062
21	Philadelphia Union	1	2,775	2,775	2,775	2,775
22	Inter Miami CF	1	2,216	2,216	2,216	2,216
23	Chicago Fire FC	0	0	0	0	0
24	FC Cincinnati	0	0	0	0	0
25	Minnesota United FC	0	0	0	0	0
26	New York City FC	0	0	0	0	0
–	Total	68	751,599	69,301	222	11,053

Note: Several additional matches had fans in attendance, but official figures have not yet been reported: Sporting Kansas City (8 home matches), Orlando City (8), FC Dallas (2), Philadelphia Union (3), Real Salt Lake (1), and Inter Miami CF (1).

=== Highest attendances ===
Regular season

Rank	Home team	Score	Away team	Attendance	Date	Week	Stadium
1	Atlanta United FC	2–1	FC Cincinnati	69,301	March 7, 2020	2	Mercedes-Benz Stadium
2	Nashville SC	1–2	Atlanta United FC	59,069	February 29, 2020	1	Nissan Stadium
3	Seattle Sounders FC	2–1	Chicago Fire FC	40,126	March 1, 2020	1	CenturyLink Field
4	Seattle Sounders FC	1–1	Columbus Crew SC	33,080	March 7, 2020	2	CenturyLink Field
5	LA Galaxy	0–1	Vancouver Whitecaps FC	26,382	March 7, 2020	2	Dignity Health Sports Park
6	Toronto FC	1–0	New York City FC	26,171	March 7, 2020	2	BMO Field
7	Orlando City SC	0–0	Real Salt Lake	25,527	February 29, 2020	1	Exploria Stadium
8	Portland Timbers	1–0	Nashville SC	25,518	March 8, 2020	2	Providence Park
9	Portland Timbers	0–0	Minnesota United FC	25,218	February 29, 2020	1	Providence Park
10	Los Angeles FC	1–0	Inter Miami CF	22,121	March 1, 2020	1	Banc of California Stadium

=== COVID-19 restrictions ===
Following the resumption of league play, some teams played either behind closed doors or with limited capacity based on local and state regulations.

FC Dallas was the first major sports team in the United States to allow a limited number of spectators at their stadium for a match on August 12. The team required all attendees to sign a waiver and remain masked at all times.

Team	Spectators	Limitations	Source(s)
Atlanta United FC	Some	All home matches from August 15, 2020, to September 30, 2020, played without spectators. Matches from October 1, 2020, onward capped at 15% capacity.	
Chicago Fire FC	None	All home matches from August 15, 2020, onward played without spectators.	
Colorado Rapids	None	All home matches from August 15, 2020, onward played without spectators.	
Columbus Crew	Some	Regular season matches played without spectators, some playoff matches played at 7.5% capacity.	
D.C. United	None	All home matches from August 15, 2020, onward played without spectators.	
FC Cincinnati	None	All home matches from August 15, 2020, onward played without spectators.	
FC Dallas	All	Capped at 10% at the resumption of league play, increased to 25% effective September 1, 2020.	
Houston Dynamo	Some	Some matches played without spectators, some matches with 12% capacity limit.	
LA Galaxy	None	All home matches from August 15, 2020, onward played without spectators.	
Los Angeles FC	None	All home matches from August 15, 2020, onward played without spectators.	
Inter Miami CF	Some	All home matches from August 15, 2020, to October 15, 2020, played without spectators. Matches from October 16, 2020, onward capped at 15% capacity.	
Minnesota United FC	None	All home matches from August 15, 2020, onward played without spectators.	
Montreal Impact	None	All home matches from August 15, 2020, onward played at Red Bull Arena in Harrison, New Jersey due to travel restrictions. Matches were played without spectators.	
Nashville SC	Some	All home matches from August 15, 2020, to September 30, 2020, played without spectators. Matches from October 1, 2020, onward capped at 5% capacity.	
New England Revolution	None	All home matches from August 15, 2020, onward played without spectators.	
New York City FC	None	All home matches from August 15, 2020, onward played without spectators.	
New York Red Bulls	None	All home matches from August 15, 2020, onward played without spectators.	
Orlando City SC	All	Capped at 20% at the resumption of league play, increased to 25% effective October 1, 2020.	
Philadelphia Union	Some	All home matches from August 15, 2020, to October 31, 2020, played without spectators. Matches from November 1, 2020, onward capped at 18% capacity.	
Portland Timbers	None	All home matches from August 15, 2020, onward played without spectators.	
Real Salt Lake	All	Capped at 20% at the resumption of league play, remained at 20% for the rest of the season.	
San Jose Earthquakes	None	All home matches from August 15, 2020, onward played without spectators.	
Seattle Sounders FC	None	All home matches from August 15, 2020, onward played without spectators.	
Sporting Kansas City	All	Capped at 10% at the resumption of league play, increased to 15% effective November 15, 2020.	
Toronto FC	None	All home matches from August 15, 2020, onward played at Pratt & Whitney Stadium in East Hartford, Connecticut due to travel restrictions. Matches were played without spectators.	
Vancouver Whitecaps FC	None	All home matches from August 15, 2020, onward played at Providence Park in Portland, Oregon due to travel restrictions. Matches were played without spectators.	

== Player statistics ==
=== Goals ===
Rank	Player	Club	Goals
1	(Uruguay) Diego Rossi	Los Angeles FC	14
2	(Slovenia) Robert Berić	Chicago Fire FC	12
2	(Peru) Raúl Ruidíaz	Seattle Sounders FC	12
2	(United States) Gyasi Zardes	Columbus Crew SC	12
5	(United States) Jordan Morris	Seattle Sounders FC	10
5	(United States) Chris Mueller	Orlando City SC	10
5	(Argentina) Cristian Pavón	LA Galaxy	10
8	(United States) Ayo Akinola	Toronto FC	9
8	(Trinidad and Tobago) Kevin Molino	Minnesota United FC	9
8	(Spain) Alejandro Pozuelo	Toronto FC	9

=== Assists ===
Rank	Player	Club	Assists
1	(Uruguay) Nicolás Lodeiro	Seattle Sounders FC	10
1	(Spain) Alejandro Pozuelo	Toronto FC	10
1	(Colombia) Darwin Quintero	Houston Dynamo FC	10
4	(Argentina) Cristian Espinoza	San Jose Earthquakes	9
5	(Colombia) Yimmi Chará	Portland Timbers	8
5	(Scotland) Lewis Morgan	Inter Miami CF	8
5	(United States) Jordan Morris	Seattle Sounders FC	8
5	(Uruguay) Mauricio Pereyra	Orlando City SC	8
5	(Portugal) Pedro Santos	Columbus Crew SC	8
10	(United States) Brenden Aaronson	Philadelphia Union	7
10	(United States) Djordje Mihailovic	Chicago Fire FC	7
10	(United States) Chris Mueller	Orlando City SC	7
10	(Argentina) Cristian Pavón	LA Galaxy	7
10	(Argentina) Emanuel Reynoso	Minnesota United FC	7
10	(Uruguay) Brian Rodríguez	Los Angeles FC	7
10	(Argentina) Diego Valeri	Portland Timbers	7

=== Shutouts ===
Rank	Player	Club	Shutouts
1	(United States) Joe Willis	Nashville SC	9
2	(Jamaica) Andre Blake	Philadelphia Union	8
3	(United States) Sean Johnson	New York City FC	7
3	(United States) Jimmy Maurer	FC Dallas	7
3	(United States) Tim Melia	Sporting Kansas City	7
3	(Curaçao) Eloy Room	Columbus Crew SC	7
7	(Switzerland) Stefan Frei	Seattle Sounders FC	6
7	(United States) Brad Guzan	Atlanta United FC	6
7	(Canada) Dayne St. Clair	Minnesota United FC	6
7	(United States) Matt Turner	New England Revolution	6
7	(United States) Quentin Westberg	Toronto FC	6

=== Hat-tricks ===
Player	For	Against	Score	Date
(United States) Ayo Akinola	Toronto FC	Montreal Impact	4−3	July 16
(Uruguay) Diego Rossi^{4}	Los Angeles FC	LA Galaxy	6−2	July 18
(Colombia) Santiago Mosquera	FC Dallas	Colorado Rapids	4–1	September 16
(Brazil) Sergio Santos	Philadelphia Union	Toronto FC	5−0	October 24
(Argentina) Valentín Castellanos	New York City FC	New York Red Bulls	5−2	November 1

^{4} Scored 4 goals

== Awards ==
=== Player of the Month ===
Month	Player	Club	Stats	Ref
August	(United States) Daryl Dike	Orlando City SC	5 GP, 6 G, 2 A	
September	(Spain) Alejandro Pozuelo	Toronto FC	6 GP, 4 G, 2 A	
October & November	(Argentina) Valentín Castellanos	New York City FC	8 GP, 6 G, 3 A	

=== Player / Team of the Week ===
- **Bold** denotes League Player of the Week.

Team of the Week
Week	Goalkeeper	Defenders	Midfielders	Forwards	Bench	Coach
1	(Netherlands) Vermeer (LAFC)	(Mexico) Alanís (SJ) (Slovenia) Struna (HOU) (United States) Duncan (NY)	(France) Valot (NY) (Trinidad and Tobago) Molino (MIN) (Israel) Kinda (SKC) (United States) Finlay (MIN)	(United States) **Morris** (SEA) (Argentina) Pavón (LA) (Mexico) Vela (LAFC)	(United States) Robles (MIA) (Colombia) Segura (LAFC) (Brazil) T. Santos (DAL) (England) Price (COL) (Argentina) Barco (ATL) (Argentina) Zelarayán (CLB) (Argentina) Urruti (MTL)	(United States) Robin Fraser (COL)
2	(Jamaica) Blake (PHI)	(Iraq) Adnan (VAN) (France) Brillant (DC) (United States) **Opara** (MIN) (United States) Rosenberry (COL)	(Argentina) Barco (ATL) (Argentina) G. Martínez (ATL) (Slovakia) Greguš (MIN) (Israel) Kinda (SKC)	(Nigeria) Achara (TOR) (Mexico) Pulido (SKC)	(United States) Clark (POR) (Croatia) Župarić (POR) (Norway) Glesnes (PHI) (Brazil) Artur (CLB) (Brazil) T. Santos (DAL) (United States) Aaronson (PHI) (Canada) Ricketts (VAN)	(United States) Peter Vermes (SKC)
MLS is Back – Round 1	(Jamaica) Blake (PHI)	(France) Brillant (DC) (United States) Glad (RSL) (United States) Duncan (NY)	(United States) Rodríguez (HOU) (United States) Nagbe (CLB) (Argentina) Zelarayán (CLB) (Trinidad and Tobago) Molino (MIN)	(United States) Zardes (CLB) (United States) Akinola (TOR) (Argentina) Bou (NE)	(United States) Guzan (ATL) (Argentina) Blanco (POR) (United States) McKenzie (PHI) (United States) Yueill (SJ) (Spain) Pozuelo (TOR) (Spain) Gil (NE) (Uruguay) Rossi (LAFC)	(United States) Caleb Porter (CLB)
MLS is Back – Round 2	(Peru) Gallese (ORL)	(Canada) Laryea (TOR) (United States) Pineda (CHI) (Ghana) Mensah (CLB)	(Spain) Pozuelo (TOR) (United States) Nagbe (CLB) (United States) Aaronson (PHI) (United States) Mueller (ORL)	(Uruguay) Rossi (LAFC) (United States) Ebobisse (POR) (United States) Akinola (TOR)	(United States) MacMath (RSL) (Republic of the Congo) Mabiala (POR) (United States) Herrera (RSL) (Spain) Rosell (ORL) (Cuba) Alonso (MIN) (Argentina) Zelarayán (CLB) (United States) Amaya (CIN)	(Colombia) Óscar Pareja (ORL)
MLS is Back – Round 3	(United States) Turner (NE)	(United States) Lima (SJ) (United States) McKenzie (PHI) (Costa Rica) Watson (CIN) (Sweden) Tinnerholm (NYC)	(United States) Morris (SEA) (Argentina) Vera (HOU) (United States) Finlay (MIN) (Peru) Reyna (VAN)	(United States) Ebobisse (POR) (Mexico) Pulido (SKC)	(Jamaica) Blake (PHI) (Serbia) Veselinović (VAN) (Cuba) Alonso (MIN) (United States) Nagbe (CLB) (Japan) Kubo (CIN) (Libya) Tajouri-Shradi (NYC) (United States) Lewis (COL)	(Netherlands) Jaap Stam (CIN)
6	(United States) Turner (NE)	(United States) Kessler (NE) (United States) Hedges (DAL) (United States) Duncan (NY)	(United States) Araujo (LA) (Cuba) Chang (RSL) (United States) Nagbe (CLB) (Argentina) G. Martínez (ATL) (Argentina) Pavón (LA)	(Peru) **Ruidíaz** (SEA) (Argentina) Piatti (TOR)	(United States) Maurer (DAL) (England) Onuoha (RSL) (Spain) Pozuelo (TOR) (Netherlands) Monteiro (PHI) (United States) Busio (SKC) (Haiti) Etienne (CLB) (Argentina) Carranza (MIA)	(United States) Freddy Juarez (RSL)
7 & 8	(United States) Turner (NE)	(Sweden) Tinnerholm (NYC) (Netherlands) Van der Werff (CIN) (Portugal) Moutinho (ORL)	(United States) Picault (DAL) (Brazil) Urso (ORL) (Finland) Ring (NYC) (United States) Morris (SEA)	(United States) Mueller (ORL) (Poland) **Przybyłko** (PHI) (United States) Baird (RSL)	(Peru) Gallese (ORL) (United States) Pineda (CHI) (United States) Lletget (LA) (Spain) Pozuelo (TOR) (Finland) Lappalainen (MTL) (Colombia) Quintero (HOU) (United States) Dike (ORL)	(Colombia) Óscar Pareja (ORL)
9	(Senegal) Diop (MTL)	(France) Camacho (MTL) (United States) Pines (DC) (Costa Rica) Watson (CIN)	(Guinea-Bissau) Gerso (SKC) (United States) Corona (LA) (Argentina) Pavón (LA)	(Colombia) Quintero (HOU) (Costa Rica) Lassiter (HOU) (Uruguay) **Rossi** (LAFC)	(United States) Seitz (DC) (Argentina) González Pírez (MIA) (Argentina) Zelarayán (CLB) (Costa Rica) Leal (NSH) (Honduras) Elis (HOU) (Brazil) Héber (NYC) (Estonia) Sorga (DC)	(United States) Tab Ramos (HOU)
10	(United States) Bingham (LA)	(Iraq) Adnan (VAN) (Norway) Glesnes (PHI) (Costa Rica) Matarrita (NYC)	(Finland) Lod (MIN) (United States) Williamson (POR) (United States) **Lletget** (LA) (Trinidad and Tobago) Molino (MIN)	(Canada) Bunbury (NE) (United States) Zardes (CLB) (Argentina) Pavón (LA)	(Canada) Hasal (VAN) (France) Brillant (DC) (Canada) Baldisimo (VAN) (United States) Aaronson (PHI) (Honduras) Elis (HOU) (United States) Jahn (ATL) (United States) Bassett (COL)	(United States) Jim Curtin (PHI)
11	(United States) Meara (NY)	(Sweden) Tinnerholm (NYC) (Ghana) Abubakar (COL) (United States) McKenzie (PHI)	(Trinidad and Tobago) Jones (SEA) (United States) Fontana (PHI) (United States) McCarty (NSH) (United States) **Morris** (SEA)	(Chile) Rubio (COL) (United States) Zardes (CLB) (Peru) Ruidíaz (SEA)	(United States) Zobeck (DAL) (United States) Long (NY) (Canada) Kaye (LAFC) (Scotland) Morgan (MIA) (Trinidad and Tobago) Molino (MIN) (Denmark) Namli (COL) (Honduras) Quioto (MTL)	(England) Gary Smith (NSH)
12	(Peru) Gallese (ORL)	(United States) Hagglund (CIN) (France) Chanot (NYC) (Ghana) Mensah (CLB)	(Argentina) **Valeri** (POR) (Bosnia and Herzegovina) Medunjanin (CIN) (Uruguay) Lodeiro (SEA) (Colombia) Mosquera (DAL)	(Poland) Przybyłko (PHI) (Colombia) Montero (VAN) (Argentina) Jara (DAL)	(United States) Johnson (NYC) (United States) McKenzie (PHI) (Colombia) D. Chará (POR) (Scotland) Russell (SKC) (Portugal) Nani (ORL) (United States) Shea (MIA) (United States) Bassett (COL)	(Canada) Marc Dos Santos (VAN)
13	(United States) Clark (POR)	(Costa Rica) Calvo (CHI) (Argentina) Meza (ATL) (United States) Kessler (NE) (United States) Bornstein (CHI)	(Portugal) Santos (CLB) (Argentina) Zelarayán (CLB) (United States) Bassett (COL) (Spain) Medrán (CHI) (Portugal) Nani (ORL)	(England) **Wright-Phillips** (LAFC)	(United States) Bono (TOR) (Sweden) Pettersson (CIN) (Norway) Glesnes (PHI) (England) Price (COL) (Panama) Godoy (NSH) (Germany) Herbers (CHI) (Canada) Kaye (LAFC)	(Switzerland) Raphaël Wicky (CHI)
14	(United States) Putna (RSL)	(Canada) **Laryea** (TOR) (Sweden) Tinnerholm (NYC) (United States) Duncan (NY)	(United States) C. Roldan (SEA) (United States) Yueill (SJ) (Romania) Mitriță (NYC) (United States) Morris (SEA)	(Argentina) Bou (NE) (United States) Barlow (NY) (Poland) Przybyłko (PHI)	(United States) Shuttleworth (CHI) (Switzerland) Ziegler (DAL) (United States) Fontana (PHI) (Germany) Herbers (CHI) (Uruguay) Pereyra (ORL) (Chile) Mora (POR) (Mexico) Ríos (NSH)	(United States) Greg Vanney (TOR)
15	(United States) Willis (NSH)	(Sweden) Tinnerholm (NYC) (United States) Kessler (NE) (Peru) López (SJ)	(United States) Lennon (ATL) (Brazil) João Paulo (SEA) (Romania) Mitriță (NYC) (Spain) Pozuelo (TOR) (Republic of Ireland) Gallagher (ATL)	(Mexico) **Pulido** (SKC) (Uruguay) Rossi (LAFC)	(Canada) St. Clair (MIN) (United States) Hollingshead (DAL) (Scotland) Morgan (MIA) (Brazil) Urso (ORL) (Uruguay) Pereyra (ORL) (United States) C. Roldan (SEA) (England) Wright-Phillips (LAFC)	(Colombia) Óscar Pareja (ORL)
16	(United States) Guzan (ATL)	(Slovenia) Struna (HOU) (Colombia) Yeimar (SEA) (New Zealand) Reid (SKC)	(Libya) Tajouri-Shradi (NYC) (Brazil) Ilsinho (PHI) (Uruguay) Lodeiro (SEA) (Colombia) Y. Chará (POR)	(United States) **Ebobisse** (POR) (Argentina) G. Higuaín (MIA) (Spain) Bojan (MTL)	(United States) Bono (TOR) (England) Elliott (PHI) (France) Marie (SJ) (United States) Parks (NYC) (Argentina) Espinoza (SJ) (United States) Akinola (TOR) (Chile) Mora (POR)	(France) Thierry Henry (MTL)
17	(United States) Clark (POR)	(United States) Nerwinski (VAN) (United States) McKenzie (PHI) (United States) Zavaleta (TOR) (United States) Harvey (LAFC)	(United States) Clark (NY) (Brazil) Ilsinho (PHI) (United States) Nguyen (NE) (Spain) Medrán (CHI) (United States) **Musovski** (LAFC)	(Poland) Niezgoda (POR)	(United States) Shuttleworth (CHI) (United States) Zimmerman (NSH) (Colombia) D. Chará (POR) (Scotland) Russell (SKC) (Scotland) Morgan (MIA) (Canada) Cavallini (VAN) (United States) Mullins (TOR)	(United States) Bob Bradley (LAFC)
18	(United States) Rowe (ORL)	(United States) Lima (SJ) (United States) Hagglund (CIN) (Iraq) Adnan (VAN)	(United States) Clark (NY) (Colombia) Ricaurte (DAL) (United States) Parks (NYC) (Croatia) Kreilach (RSL)	(Poland) Buksa (NE) (Canada) Cavallini (VAN) (Germany) **Mukhtar** (NSH)	(United States) Guzan (ATL) (United States) Parker (NY) (Brazil) Ruan (ORL) (Argentina) Asad (DC) (Mexico) Fierro (SJ) (Colombia) Montero (VAN) (Argentina) G. Higuaín (MIA)	(United States) Freddy Juarez (RSL)
19	(United States) Tarbell (CLB)	(United States) Odoi-Atsem (DCU) (United States) Pines (DCU) (United States) Bornstein (CHI)	(United States) Finlay (MIN) (Spain) **Bojan** (MTL) (Israel) Kinda (SKC) (Argentina) Piatti (TOR)	(United States) White (NY) (Chile) Mora (POR) (Netherlands) Koreniuk (LA)	(Canada) St. Clair (MIN) (United States) Lima (SJ) (Canada) Laryea (TOR) (United States) Mihailovic (CHI) (Brazil) Artur (CLB) (Portugal) Santos (CLB) (United States) Torres (LAFC)	(France) Thierry Henry (MTL)
20	(Jamaica) Blake (PHI)	(United States) Canouse (DCU) (United States) Zimmerman (NSH) (Argentina) González Pírez (MIA) (Germany) Wagner (PHI)	(Colombia) D. Chará (POR) (Argentina) Moralez (NYC) (Costa Rica) Leal (NSH)	(United States) Musovski (LAFC) (Mexico) Pulido (SKC) (Brazil) **Santos** (PHI)	(United States) Maurer (DAL) (Iraq) Adnan (VAN) (Spain) Fontàs (SKC) (Scotland) Morgan (MIA) (Venezuela) Martínez (PHI) (Poland) Przybyłko (PHI) (United States) Schoenfeld (MIN)	(United States) Jim Curtin (PHI)
21	(United States) Maurer (DAL)	(United States) Reynolds (DAL) (United States) Long (NY) (United States) Hollingshead (DAL)	(Germany) Gressel (DCU) (Costa Rica) Leal (NSH) (Argentina) Reynoso (MIN) (Colombia) Y. Chará (POR)	(Peru) Ruidíaz (SEA) (United States) **Wondolowski** (SJO) (United States) Dike (ORL)	(Netherlands) Vermeer (LAFC) (Colombia) Segura (LAFC) (Paraguay) Medina (NYC) (Honduras) Espinoza (SKC) (Poland) Przybyłko (PHI) (Uruguay) Rossi (LAFC) (Poland) Niezgoda (POR)	(United States) Chad Ashton (DCU)
22	(Curaçao) Room (CLB)	(Costa Rica) González (LA) (United States) Zimmerman (NSH) (United States) Vines (COL)	(Canada) Buchanan (NE) (Uruguay) Pereyra (ORL) (Colombia) Ricaurte (DAL) (United States) Picault (DAL)	(Brazil) Shinyashiki (COL) (Argentina) **Castellanos** (NYC) (Canada) Bunbury (NE)	(Peru) Gallese (ORL) (Canada) Laryea (TOR) (United States) Pineda (CHI) (Finland) Ring (NYC) (Brazil) Artur (CLB) (Argentina) Moreno (ATL) (Colombia) Y. Chará (POR)	(United States) Robin Fraser (COL)
23	(United States) Willis (NSH)	(Madagascar) Métanire (MIN) (United States) Hedges (DAL) (United States) Pineda (CHI) (United States) Vines (COL)	(Argentina) Espinoza (SJ) (Brazil) Judson (SJ) (Uruguay) Pereyra (ORL) (Brazil) T. Santos (DAL) (United States) Hollingshead (DAL)	(Slovenia) Berić (CHI)	(Canada) St. Clair (MIN) (Scotland) Wilson (COL) (United States) Acosta (COL) (Uruguay) Lodeiro (SEA) (United States) Mueller (ORL) (Mexico) Hernández (LA) (United States) Wondolowski (SJ)	(Argentina) Matías Almeyda (SJ)
24	(United States) Bush (VAN)	(Ghana) Mensah (CLB) (Norway) Glesnes (PHI) (New Zealand) Reid (SKC)	(Germany) Mukhtar (NSH) (Venezuela) Martínez (PHI) (Argentina) Reynoso (MIN) (Trinidad and Tobago) **Molino** (MIN)	(Honduras) Quioto (MTL) (Colombia) Montero (VAN) (Argentina) Castellanos (NYC)	(United States) Meara (NY) (United States) Ambrose (MIA) (Scotland) Morgan (MIA) (Netherlands) Monteiro (PHI) (Uruguay) Lodeiro (SEA) (Argentina) Valeri (POR) (Chile) Rubio (COL)	(United States) Jim Curtin (PHI)

=== Goal of the Week ===
Goal of the Week
Week	Player	Club	Ref
1	(United States) Emerson Hyndman	Atlanta United FC	
MLS is Back – Round 1	(Argentina) Lucas Zelarayán	Columbus Crew SC	
MLS is Back – Round 2	(United States) Frankie Amaya	FC Cincinnati	
MLS is Back – Round 3	(Guinea-Bissau) Gerso Fernandes	Sporting Kansas City	
6	(Argentina) Pity Martínez	Atlanta United FC	
7 & 8	(Peru) Raúl Ruidíaz	Seattle Sounders FC	
9	(Argentina) Pablo Ruíz	Real Salt Lake	
10	(United States) Sebastian Lletget	LA Galaxy	
11	(United States) Anthony Fontana	Philadelphia Union	
12	(Bosnia and Herzegovina) Haris Medunjanin	FC Cincinnati	
14	(Canada) Richie Laryea	Toronto FC	
15	(United States) Brooks Lennon	Atlanta United FC	
16	(Argentina) Gonzalo Higuaín	Inter Miami CF	
17	(United States) Erik Hurtado	Sporting Kansas City	
18	(United States) Mark McKenzie	Philadelphia Union	
19	(Spain) Bojan	Montreal Impact	
20	(Iraq) Ali Adnan	Vancouver Whitecaps FC	
21	(Peru) Andy Polo	Portland Timbers	
22	(United States) Keegan Rosenberry	Colorado Rapids	
23	(United States) Benji Michel	Orlando City SC	
24	(United States) Mikey Ambrose	Inter Miami CF	

=== End-of-season awards ===
Award	Winner (club)	Ref
Most Valuable Player	Alejandro Pozuelo (Toronto FC)	
Defender of the Year	Walker Zimmerman (Nashville SC)	
Goalkeeper of the Year	Andre Blake (Philadelphia Union)	
Coach of the Year	Jim Curtin (Philadelphia Union)	
Young Player of the Year	Diego Rossi (Los Angeles FC)	
Newcomer of the Year	Lucas Zelarayán (Columbus Crew SC)	
Comeback Player of the Year	Bradley Wright-Phillips (Los Angeles FC)	
Golden Boot	Diego Rossi (Los Angeles FC)	
Humanitarian of the Year	Black Players for Change (Various)	
Referee of the Year	Ismail Elfath	
Assistant Referee of the Year	Kathryn Nesbitt	
Goal of the Year	Darlington Nagbe (Columbus Crew SC)	
Save of the Year	Eloy Room (Columbus Crew SC)	

=== MLS Best XI ===
Goalkeeper	Defenders	Midfielders	Forwards	Ref
(Jamaica) Andre Blake, Philadelphia	(United States) Mark McKenzie, Philadelphia (Ghana) Jonathan Mensah, Columbus (United States) Walker Zimmerman, Nashville SC	(United States) Brenden Aaronson, Philadelphia (Colombia) Diego Chará, Portland (Uruguay) Nicolás Lodeiro, Seattle (Spain) Alejandro Pozuelo, Toronto FC	(United States) Jordan Morris, Seattle (Uruguay) Diego Rossi, LAFC (Peru) Raúl Ruidíaz, Seattle	

== Player movement ==
=== Collective bargaining agreement ===
On February 6, 2020, MLS and the MLS Players Association agreed to a new five-year collective bargaining agreement (CBA) which will last through the 2024 season. The primary issues negotiated were increased player spending, expanded free agency, and more charter travel.

The new collective bargaining agreement saw the league increase player spending to around $11.6 million per club by 2024, with both senior and reserve minimum salaries receiving increases throughout the deal as well as player bonuses for winning games and tournaments. The league also reduced Targeted Allocation Money by redistributing it into General Allocation Money. In addition, the players would earn a share in any increases in the league's new media deal in 2023.

The Players Association also negotiated a significantly lower threshold for free agency, which was previously set at 28 years of age with eight years of service time in the league. Under the new agreement, the free agency requirement for players was set at 24 years of age, with five years of service time. The number of charter flights allowed for each team was increased from four legs to eight one-way trips in 2020, with future allowances up to 16 one-way trips by 2024. Each MLS team was also required to charter flights for all MLS Cup Playoffs matches and CONCACAF Champions League matches.

Year	Salary budget	Standard minimum salary	Reserve minimum	DP threshold	General Allocation Money per team	Targeted Allocation Money per team	Total spending bar per team
2020	$4,900,000	$81,375	$63,547	$612,500	$1,525,000	$2,800,000	$9,225,000
2021	$5,210,000	$85,444	$67,360	$651,250	$1,900,000	$2,720,000	$9,830,000
2022	$5,470,000	$89,716	$71,401	$683,750	$2,585,000	$2,400,000	$10,455,000
2023	$5,950,000	$104,000	$80,622	$743,750	$2,830,000	$2,225,000	$11,055,000
2024	$6,425,000	$109,200	$85,502	$803,125	$3,093,000	$2,125,000	$11,643,000

=== SuperDraft ===
At the MLS SuperDraft in January every year, Major League Soccer teams select players who have graduated from college or otherwise been signed by the league. The first two rounds of the 2020 MLS SuperDraft took place on January 9, 2020, and, unlike previous drafts, was held without a major event ceremony and was instead streamed on Twitter via ESPN. The third and fourth rounds were held via conference call on January 13.

Inter Miami CF and Nashville SC, as expansion clubs, held the first two spots in the SuperDraft. Clemson Tigers forward Robbie Robinson was selected with the first-overall pick by Inter Miami.

=== Allocation ranking ===
The allocation ranking was the mechanism used to determine which MLS club had first priority to acquire a player who was in the MLS allocation list. The MLS allocation list contained select U.S. national team players and players transferred outside of MLS garnering a transfer fee of at least $500,000. The allocations were ranked in reverse order of finish for the 2019 season, taking playoff performance into account.

Once the club used its allocation ranking to acquire a player, it dropped to the bottom of the list. A ranking could be traded provided that part of the compensation received in return was another club's ranking. At all times each club was assigned one ranking. The rankings reset at the end of each MLS season.

Original ranking	Current ranking	Club	Date allocation used (Rank on that date)	Player signed	Previous club	Ref
24	1	Los Angeles FC				
2	2	Inter Miami CF				
3	3	FC Cincinnati				
4	4	Vancouver Whitecaps FC				
5	5	Orlando City SC				
6	6	Sporting Kansas City				
7	7	Columbus Crew SC				
8	8	Houston Dynamo FC				
9	9	Montreal Impact				
10	10	Chicago Fire FC				
11	11	Colorado Rapids				
12	12	San Jose Earthquakes				
13	13	New England Revolution				
14	14	FC Dallas				
15	15	New York Red Bulls				
16	16	Portland Timbers				
17	17	D.C. United				
18	18	Minnesota United FC				
19	19	LA Galaxy				
20	20	Real Salt Lake				
21	21	Philadelphia Union				
22	22	New York City FC				
23	23	Atlanta United FC				
1	24	Nashville SC				
25	25	Toronto FC				
26	26	Seattle Sounders FC				

1. On February 26, 2020, Los Angeles FC acquired the number 1 allocation ranking from Nashville SC in exchange for the number 24 allocation ranking, $350,000 in combined 2020 and 2021 general allocation money, and a second-round selection in the 2022 MLS SuperDraft.

== MLS is Back Tournament ==
To prevent an outbreak of COVID-19 occurring during the season, a bracket tournament, dubbed the "MLS is Back Tournament", was announced on June 10. The tournament took place behind closed doors at the ESPN Wide World of Sports Complex located in the Walt Disney World Resort, in Bay Lake, Florida, with the regular season slated to begin following the tournament. The group stage of the tournament counted towards the regular season. MLS announced its plan to restart the 2020 season with all 26 MLS clubs competing in the MLS is Back Tournament at ESPN Wide World of Sports Complex at Walt Disney World Resort in Florida beginning July 8. The tournament, which was played without fans in attendance, provided.a compelling way for MLS to resume its 25th season. On July 6, FC Dallas withdrew from the tournament due to ten players and one staff member of the club testing positive for COVID-19, after their opening match was initially postponed. On July 9, Nashville SC were also withdrawn from the tournament after nine players of the club tested positive for the virus, after their opening match was initially postponed.

Each team played three group stage matches, and those results counted in the 2020 MLS regular season standings. After 16 consecutive days of group stage matches, the top two teams from each group along with the four best third-place finishers, moved on to the knockout stage. The knockout stage included a round of 16, quarter-finals, semi-finals, and the championship match which took place on August 11. Matches tied at the end of regulation in the knockout phase proceeded directly to a penalty shoot-out.

As MLS is Back Tournament winners, the Portland Timbers earned a spot in the 2021 CONCACAF Champions League. They replaced the berth previously awarded to the MLS regular season points leader in the conference opposite of the Supporters' Shield winner.

In addition to matches that counted in the regular season standings and the Champions League berth, players had the opportunity to earn additional bonuses as part of a $1.1 million prize pool.

=== Groups ===
Group A (East)
Group B (West)
Group C (East)

Group A results
Pos	Team	Pld	Pts
1	Orlando City SC (H)	3	7
2	Philadelphia Union	3	7
3	New York City FC	3	3
4	Inter Miami CF	3	0

Source: MLS
(H) Hosts

Group B results
Pos	Team	Pld	Pts
1	San Jose Earthquakes	3	7
2	Seattle Sounders FC	3	4
3	Vancouver Whitecaps FC	3	3
4	Chicago Fire	3	3

Source: MLS

Group C results
Pos	Team	Pld	Pts
1	Toronto FC	3	5
2	New England Revolution	3	5
3	Montreal Impact	3	3
4	D.C. United	3	2

Source: MLS
Group D (West)
Group E (East)
Group F (West)

Group D results
Pos	Team	Pld	Pts
1	Sporting Kansas City	3	6
2	Minnesota United FC	3	5
3	Real Salt Lake	3	4
4	Colorado Rapids	3	1

Source: MLS

Group E results
Pos	Team	Pld	Pts
1	Columbus Crew SC	3	9
2	FC Cincinnati	3	6
3	New York Red Bulls	3	3
4	Atlanta United	3	0

Source: MLS

Group F results
Pos	Team	Pld	Pts
1	Portland Timbers	3	7
2	Los Angeles FC	3	5
3	Houston Dynamo	3	2
4	LA Galaxy	3	1

Source: MLS

=== Knockout ===
Round of 16
July 25
Philadelphia Union	1
New England Revolution	0
July 26
Sporting Kansas City	0 (3)
Vancouver Whitecaps FC	0 (1)
July 26
Toronto FC	1
New York City FC	3
July 28
Portland Timbers	1 (4)
FC Cincinnati	1 (2)
July 25
Orlando City SC	1
Montreal Impact	0
July 27
Seattle Sounders FC	1
Los Angeles FC	4
July 27
San Jose Earthquakes	5
Real Salt Lake	2
July 28
Columbus Crew SC	1 (3)
Minnesota United FC	1 (5)

Quarter-finals
July 30
Philadelphia Union	3
Sporting Kansas City	1
August 1
New York City FC	1
Portland Timbers	3
July 31
Orlando City SC	1 (5)
Los Angeles FC	1 (4)
August 1
San Jose Earthquakes	1
Minnesota United FC	4

Semi-finals
August 5
Philadelphia Union	1
Portland Timbers	2
August 6
Orlando City SC	3
Minnesota United FC	1

Final
August 11
Portland Timbers	2
Orlando City SC	1

== See also ==
- COVID-19 pandemic in Canada
- COVID-19 pandemic in the United States
- Impact of the COVID-19 pandemic on sports
