= Trillium Cup =

Soccer rivalry

- Location: Great Lakes region
- Teams: Columbus Crew; Toronto FC
- First meeting: March 29, 2008; MLS regular season CLB 3–1 TOR
- Latest meeting: October 24, 2026; MLS regular season CLB 4–2 TOR
- Stadiums: BMO Field, Toronto; ScottsMiracle-Gro Field, Columbus

Statistics
- Total meetings: 50
- Most wins: Columbus (11 series wins, 21 individual wins)
- All-time series: CLB 21–16–13 TOR
- Largest victory: TOR 5–0 CLB; MLS regular season (May 26, 2017)

The Trillium Cup is an annual rivalry cup between Major League Soccer clubs Columbus Crew and Toronto FC. The Trillium Cup is named after the trillium, which is both the official flower of the Canadian province of Ontario, and the official wildflower of the U.S. state of Ohio. The rivalry draws on the teams’ similarities: the teams are geographically adjacent; near the Great Lakes that border the United States and Canada, and each play home matches in their respective soccer-specific stadium.

== History ==
The Trillium Cup was instituted in 2008, the second season of Toronto FC's play in Major League Soccer (MLS). The inaugural game of the Trillium Cup was played on March 29, 2008, at Columbus Crew Stadium.

The initial rivalry between the Trillium teams was supported by the mayors of the respective cities. In 2008, Mayor Michael B. Coleman of Columbus and Mayor David Miller of Toronto started a small wager on their respective team for the first installment of the Trillium Cup – the mayor of the losing team was required to wear the winning team's jersey.

The rivalry became more intense when Toronto FC fans bought 2,500 tickets to the inaugural game at Columbus Crew Stadium, with buses organized for fans from Toronto heading to Columbus for the first game on March 29, 2008. The Crew won 2–0 over their new rival. The second and third meetings, at Toronto's BMO Field, were draws; 0–0 and 1–1, respectively. The Crew claimed the inaugural Trillium Cup with a 5–2 score on points earned.

In 2011, Toronto defeated Columbus 4–2, recording their first ever win against the Crew and securing their first Trillium Cup.

In 2017, Toronto and Columbus met for the first time in the MLS Cup playoffs, in the Eastern Conference Finals, as Toronto advanced to the MLS Cup final 1–0 on aggregate.

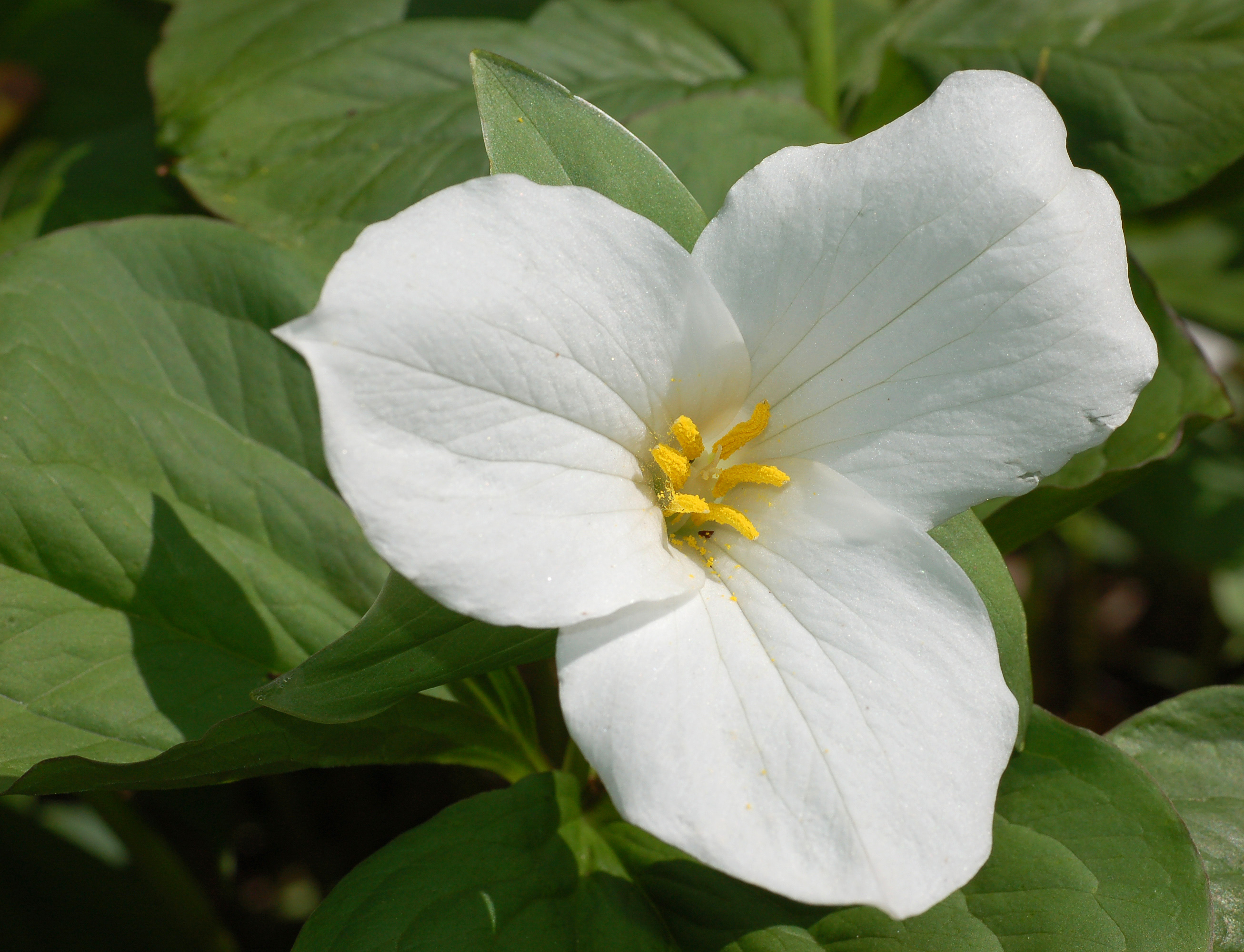
A white trillium (Trillium grandiflorum), the provincial flower of Ontario and the state wildflower of Ohio

In 2020 and 2021, COVID-19 travel restrictions imposed by the Canadian Government forced Toronto to play rivalry matches in Pratt & Whitney Stadium in Connecticut in 2020 followed by Orlando SC's Exploria Stadium in Orlando, Florida in 2021 where Toronto played home matches in these stadiums as the home team. This marked the first time that the rivalry matches were played on neutral ground. In 2020, Toronto won their only meeting in 2020 with Columbus 3–1 in September 2020. The next year Toronto won the first leg of the rivalry match in 2021 with a score of 2–0. Columbus Crew would later win the second leg of the rivalry in 2021 on the last rivalry match to be taken place at the Historic Crew Stadium before the Columbus Crew moves to Lower.com Field in July 2021. Columbus won the match 2–1.

== Winners by year ==
The cup is awarded to the team that wins the most points from the series at the season's end.

In the event of a draw on points, the following tiebreakers are used to determine the winner

1. Goal difference (goals-for minus goals-against) in Trillium Cup matches
2. Total goals in Trillium Cup Matches
3. Tiebreakers 1 and 2 are run again on a per-game average for road matches
4. Tiebreakers 1 and 2 are run again on a per-game average for home matches
5. Fewest combined team disciplinary points in Trillium Cup matches
6. Team that is currently in possession of the Trillium Cup from the previous year retains it for another season

Year	Winner	Points	Aggregate score
2008	Columbus Crew	5–2	3–1
2009	Columbus Crew	5–2	5–4
2010	Columbus Crew	4–1	4–2
2011	Toronto FC	4–1	5–3
2012	Columbus Crew	9–0	5–2
2013	Columbus Crew	6–3	4–2
2014	Toronto FC	9–0	8–4
2015	Columbus Crew SC	7–1	7–3
2016	Toronto FC	5–2	4–1
2017	Toronto FC	6–3	8–3
2018	Columbus Crew SC	4–1	5–3
2019	Toronto FC	4–1	3–2
2020	Toronto FC	3–0	3–1
2021	Toronto FC	3–3	3–2
2022	Columbus Crew	6–0	4–2
2023	Columbus Crew	4–1	3–1
2024	Columbus Crew	6–0	6–0
2025	Toronto FC	2–2	2–2 (Note: by fewest team disciplinary points (1 to 3))
2026	Columbus Crew	3–3	5–4

== Series results ==
Columbus win Draw Toronto win

Winners by year			Individual results						
Competition	Year	Winners	Points	Aggregate score	Venue	Date	Score		Recap
Competition	Year	Winners	Points	Aggregate score	Venue	Date	Columbus	Toronto	Recap
Major League Soccer	2007	Columbus Crew	7–1	6–3 (Note: These games were played before the Trillium Cup was created.)	Columbus Crew Stadium	May 26, 2007	2	2	
Major League Soccer	2007	Columbus Crew	7–1	6–3	Columbus Crew Stadium	July 22, 2007	2	0	
Major League Soccer	2007	Columbus Crew	7–1	6–3	BMO Field	September 22, 2007	2	1	
Major League Soccer	2008	Columbus Crew	5–2	3–1	Columbus Crew Stadium	March 29, 2008	2	0	
Major League Soccer	2008	Columbus Crew	5–2	3–1	BMO Field	May 17, 2008	0	0	
Major League Soccer	2008	Columbus Crew	5–2	3–1	BMO Field	September 13, 2008	1	1	
Major League Soccer	2009	Columbus Crew	5–2	5–4	Columbus Crew Stadium	March 28, 2009	1	1	
Major League Soccer	2009	Columbus Crew	5–2	5–4	BMO Field	May 2, 2009	1	1	
Major League Soccer	2009	Columbus Crew	5–2	5–4	Columbus Crew Stadium	July 25, 2009	3	2	
Major League Soccer	2010	Columbus Crew	4–1	4–2	Columbus Crew Stadium	March 27, 2010	2	0	
Major League Soccer	2010	Columbus Crew	4–1	4–2	BMO Field	October 16, 2010	2	2	
Major League Soccer	2011	Toronto FC	4–1	5–3	BMO Field	April 23, 2011	1	1	
Major League Soccer	2011	Toronto FC	4–1	5–3	Columbus Crew Stadium	September 10, 2011	2	4	
Major League Soccer	2012	Columbus Crew	9–0	5–2	BMO Field	March 31, 2012	1	0	
Major League Soccer	2012	Columbus Crew	9–0	5–2	Columbus Crew Stadium	August 22, 2012	2	1	
Major League Soccer	2012	Columbus Crew	9–0	5–2	Columbus Crew Stadium	October 28, 2012	2	1	
Major League Soccer	2013	Columbus Crew	6–3	4–2	BMO Field	May 18, 2013	1	0	
Major League Soccer	2013	Columbus Crew	6–3	4–2	BMO Field	July 27, 2013	1	2	
Major League Soccer	2013	Columbus Crew	6–3	4–2	Columbus Crew Stadium	August 17, 2013	2	0	
Major League Soccer	2014	Toronto FC	9–0	8–4	Columbus Crew Stadium	April 5, 2014	0	2	
Major League Soccer	2014	Toronto FC	9–0	8–4	BMO Field	May 31, 2014	2	3	
Major League Soccer	2014	Toronto FC	9–0	8–4	Columbus Crew Stadium	August 9, 2014	2	3	
Major League Soccer	2015	Columbus Crew SC	7–1	7–3	Mapfre Stadium	March 14, 2015	2	0	
Major League Soccer	2015	Columbus Crew SC	7–1	7–3	Mapfre Stadium	July 25, 2015	3	3	
Major League Soccer	2015	Columbus Crew SC	7–1	7–3	BMO Field	October 17, 2015	2	0	
Major League Soccer	2016	Toronto FC	5–2	4–1	BMO Field	May 21, 2016	0	0	
Major League Soccer	2016	Toronto FC	5–2	4–1	Mapfre Stadium	July 13, 2016	1	1	
Major League Soccer	2016	Toronto FC	5–2	4–1	BMO Field	July 31, 2016	0	3	
Major League Soccer	2017	Toronto FC	6–3	8–3	Mapfre Stadium	April 15, 2017	2	1	
Major League Soccer	2017	Toronto FC	6–3	8–3	Mapfre Stadium	May 10, 2017	1	2	
Major League Soccer	2017	Toronto FC	6–3	8–3	BMO Field	May 26, 2017	0	5	
MLS Cup playoffs	2017	Toronto FC	3–1	1–0 (Note: These playoff results do not count towards the Trillium Cup.)	Mapfre Stadium	November 21, 2017	0	0	
MLS Cup playoffs	2017	Toronto FC	3–1	1–0	BMO Field	November 29, 2017	0	1	
Major League Soccer	2018	Columbus Crew SC	4–1	5–3	BMO Field	March 3, 2018	2	0	
Major League Soccer	2018	Columbus Crew SC	4–1	5–3	Mapfre Stadium	June 2, 2018	3	3	
Major League Soccer	2019	Toronto FC	4–1	3–2	Mapfre Stadium	August 17, 2019	2	2	
Major League Soccer	2019	Toronto FC	4–1	3–2	BMO Field	October 6, 2019	0	1	
Major League Soccer	2020	Toronto FC	3–0	3–1	Pratt & Whitney Stadium (Note: Toronto played as the home team for matches played in Pratt & Whitney Stadium.)	September 27, 2020	1	3	
Major League Soccer	2021	Toronto FC	3–3	3–2	Exploria Stadium (Note: Toronto played as the home team for matches played in Exploria Stadium.)	May 12, 2021	0	2	
Major League Soccer	2021	Toronto FC	3–3	3–2	Historic Crew Stadium	May 29, 2021	2	1	[27]
Major League Soccer	2022	Columbus Crew	6–0	4–2	Lower.com Field	March 12, 2022	2	1	[28]
Major League Soccer	2022	Columbus Crew	6–0	4–2	BMO Field	June 29, 2022	2	1	[29]
Major League Soccer	2023	Columbus Crew	4–1	3–1	BMO Field	March 11, 2023	1	1	[28]
Major League Soccer	2023	Columbus Crew	4–1	3–1	Lower.com Field	August 26, 2023	2	0	[29]
Major League Soccer	2024	Columbus Crew	6–0	6–0	Lower.com Field	July 6, 2024	4	0	[30]
Major League Soccer	2024	Columbus Crew	6–0	6–0	BMO Field	September 18, 2024	2	0	[31]
Major League Soccer	2025	Toronto FC	2–2	2–2	BMO Field	August 16, 2025	1	1	[32]
Major League Soccer	2025	Toronto FC	2–2	2–2	Lower.com Field	September 20, 2025	1	1	[33]
Major League Soccer	2026	Columbus Crew	3–3	5–4	BMO Field	March 21, 2026	1	2	[34]
Major League Soccer	2026	Columbus Crew	3–3	5–4	ScottsMiracle-Gro Field	October 24, 2026	4	2	[35]

+ Points based on wins (3), draws (1) and losses (0)
– Tiebreakers: 1) goal differential, 2) goals scored, 3) disciplinary points, 4) previous year winners

== Statistics ==
As of October 24, 2026

Competition	Matches	Wins		Draws	Goals	
Competition	Matches	CLB	TOR	Draws	CLB	TOR
MLS regular season	48	21	12	15	75	63
MLS Cup playoffs	2	0	1	1	0	1
Total	50	21	13	16	75	64

== See also ==
- Lamar Hunt Pioneer Cup, a preseason match played between FC Dallas and Columbus Crew
- MLS rivalry cups
