= Homegrown Player Rule (MLS) =

Major League Soccer recruitment program

The Homegrown Player Rule is a Major League Soccer program that allows MLS teams to sign local players from their own development academies directly to MLS first-team rosters. Before the creation of the rule in 2008, every player entering Major League Soccer would have to be assigned through one of the existing MLS player allocation processes, such as the MLS SuperDraft.

MLS roster rules allow a team to sign players to contracts similar to Generation Adidas contracts, which do not count against the MLS salary budget and may earn a much higher salary than the league minimum. MLS has since removed this wording from the roster rules. That means homegrown players will not count against the salary budget only if they are registered using supplemental roster slots, but will still count against the salary budget if they are registered using senior roster slots. There is, however, a supplementary salary budget made by MLS only for homegrown players that are registered using senior roster slots called homegrown player funds.

To place a player on its homegrown player list, making him eligible to sign as a homegrown player, players must have resided in that club's home territory and participated in the club's youth development system for at least one year, as well as meeting other unspecified league requirements. The restrictions for homegrown players were modified in 2022 to allow clubs to prioritize signing rights of nine non-academy players within their territory. Non-protected players were then allowed to sign with any MLS club without requiring compensation to be paid to another team.

If a player on a team's homegrown list goes to college or U17, U20, and U23 United States men's national soccer teams, he remains eligible to sign as a homegrown player at any time as long as he is registered with the club as a homegrown player first. Since the program's inception, some players have elected to skip years in college to play in MLS academies and sign with senior clubs.

In 2014, Seattle's DeAndre Yedlin became the first MLS homegrown player to compete in a World Cup.

== Homegrown territories ==
As of 2024, the homegrown territories for most MLS clubs is defined as a 75-mile (121 km) radius around the team's home stadium, with some exceptions when another team is nearby. Certain teams are also granted entire states or portions of adjacent states. San Diego FC is allowed to claim players from Mexico within a driving distance of 62.1-mile (99.9 km) from their training facility.

== Homegrown players history ==
Notes

- This list only includes players who were fully eligible to be a homegrown player and officially signed a homegrown player contract with MLS. This is not a list of academy players for each respective MLS team.
- Players with their names in **Bold** have received a full international cap.
- Former MLS sides Miami Fusion and Tampa Bay Mutiny were dissolved before the introduction of the homegrown player rule.
- The following list of players have been reported as or claimed to be homegrown players, but never officially signed a homegrown player contract identifying them as such for MLS roster rule purposes; Julián Araujo, Freddie Braun, Eduardo Cortes, Kyle Duncan, Raheem Edwards, Steven Emory, Jake LaCava, Chris Lema, Nico Lemoine, Pierre da Silva, and Zack Steffen.
- Nizar Khalfan was classified as a homegrown player, despite never been part of the Vancouver Whitecaps academy.

=== Atlanta United FC ===
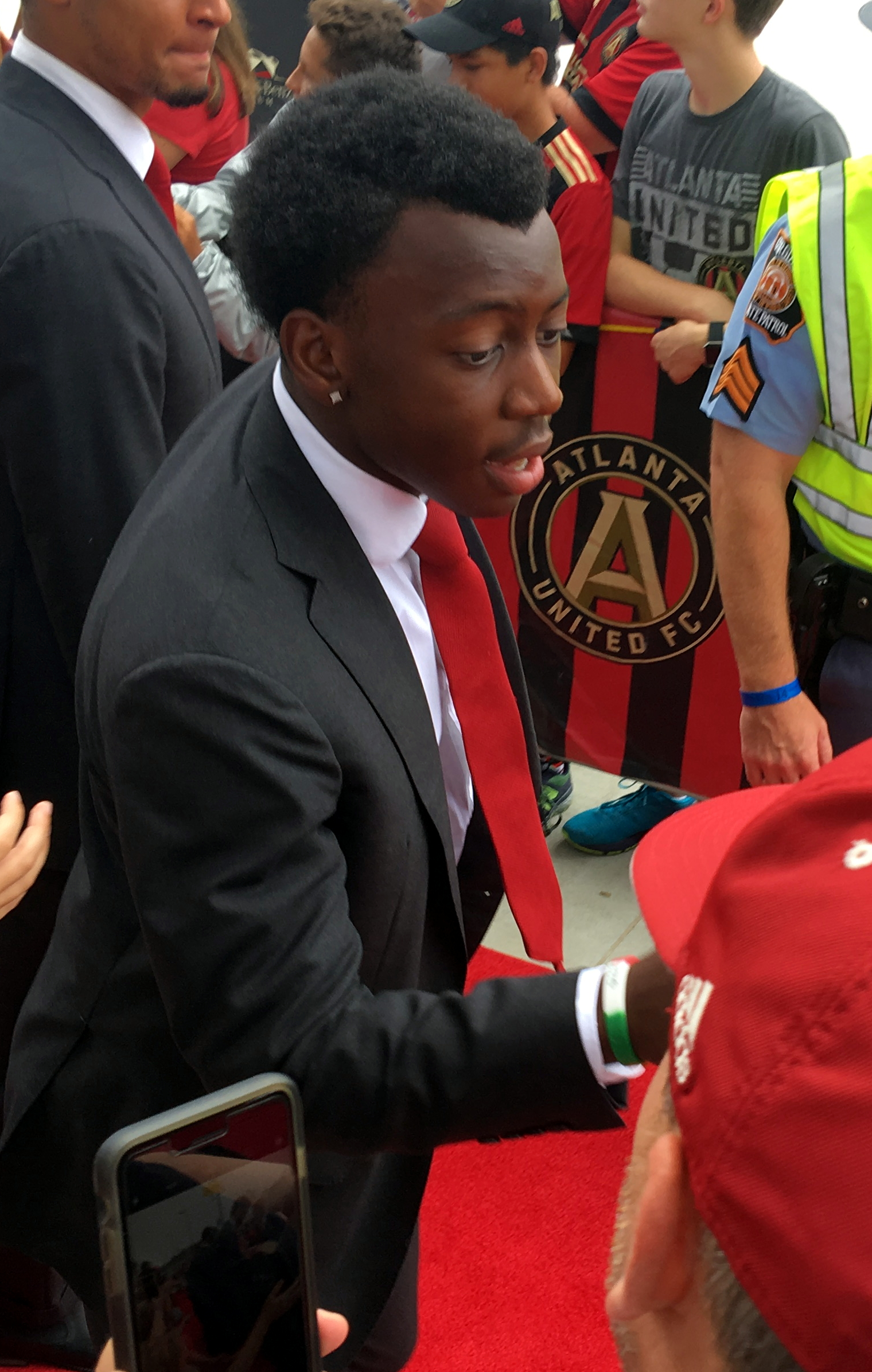
Atlanta United FC homegrown player George Bello is a 2021 MLS All-Star. Bello has earned 7 caps with the USMNT.

Player	Current club	Year signed
(United States) Andrew Carleton	retired	2016
(United States) Chris Goslin	retired	2017
(United States) Lagos Kunga	(United States) Portland Hearts of Pine	2017
(United States) **George Bello**	(Austria) LASK	2018
(Nigeria) Patrick Okonkwo	retired	2018
(United States) George Campbell	(England) West Bromwich Albion	2020
(United States) Jackson Conway		2020
(United States) Tyler Wolff	(United States) Sacramento Republic (on loan from (United States) Real Salt Lake)	2020
(Bolivia) Efrain Morales	(Canada) CF Montréal	2021
(South Sudan) **Machop Chol**	(South Korea) Ansan Greeners	2021
(United States) Bryce Washington	(United States) Birmingham Legion	2021
(United States) Justin Garces	retired	2022
(United States) **Caleb Wiley**	(England) Preston North End (on loan from (England) Chelsea)	2022
(Trinidad and Tobago) **Ajani Fortune**	(United States) Atlanta United	2023
(United States) Noah Cobb	(United States) Colorado Rapids	2023
(United States) Luke Brennan	(United States) Atlanta United	2024
(Puerto Rico) Adyn Torres	(Estonia) Nõmme United (on loan from (United States) Atlanta United)	2024
(United States) Garrison Tubbs	(United States) Orange County SC (on loan from (United States) D.C. United)	2024
(United States) Matt Edwards	(United States) Atlanta United	2024
(Jamaica) Ashton Gordon	(United States) Chattanooga FC (on loan from (United States) Atlanta United)	2025
(United States) Will Reilly	(United States) Atlanta United	2025
(United States) Dominik Chong-Qui	(United States) Atlanta United	2025
(United States) Cooper Sanchez	(United States) Atlanta United	2025
(Venezuela) Santiago Pita	(United States) Atlanta United	2026
(United States) Kaiden Moore	(United States) Philadelphia Union (on loan from (United States) Atlanta United)	2026

=== Austin FC ===
Player	Current club	Year signed
(United States) Owen Wolff	(United States) Sporting Kansas City	2021
(United States) Damian Las	(United States) Austin FC	2022
(United States) Micah Burton	(United States) Austin FC	2024
(United States) Ervin Torres	(United States) Austin FC	2026

=== Charlotte FC ===
Player	Current club	Year signed
(United States) Chris Hegardt	(United States) Orange County SC	2022
(United States) Brian Romero	(United States) Charlotte FC	2022
(United States) Nimfasha Berchimas	(United States) Charlotte FC	2023
(United States) Brandon Cambridge	(United States) Orange County SC	2023
(United States) Jack Neeley	(United States) Charlotte FC	2023
(United States) Aron John	(United States) Charlotte FC	2026

=== Chicago Fire FC ===
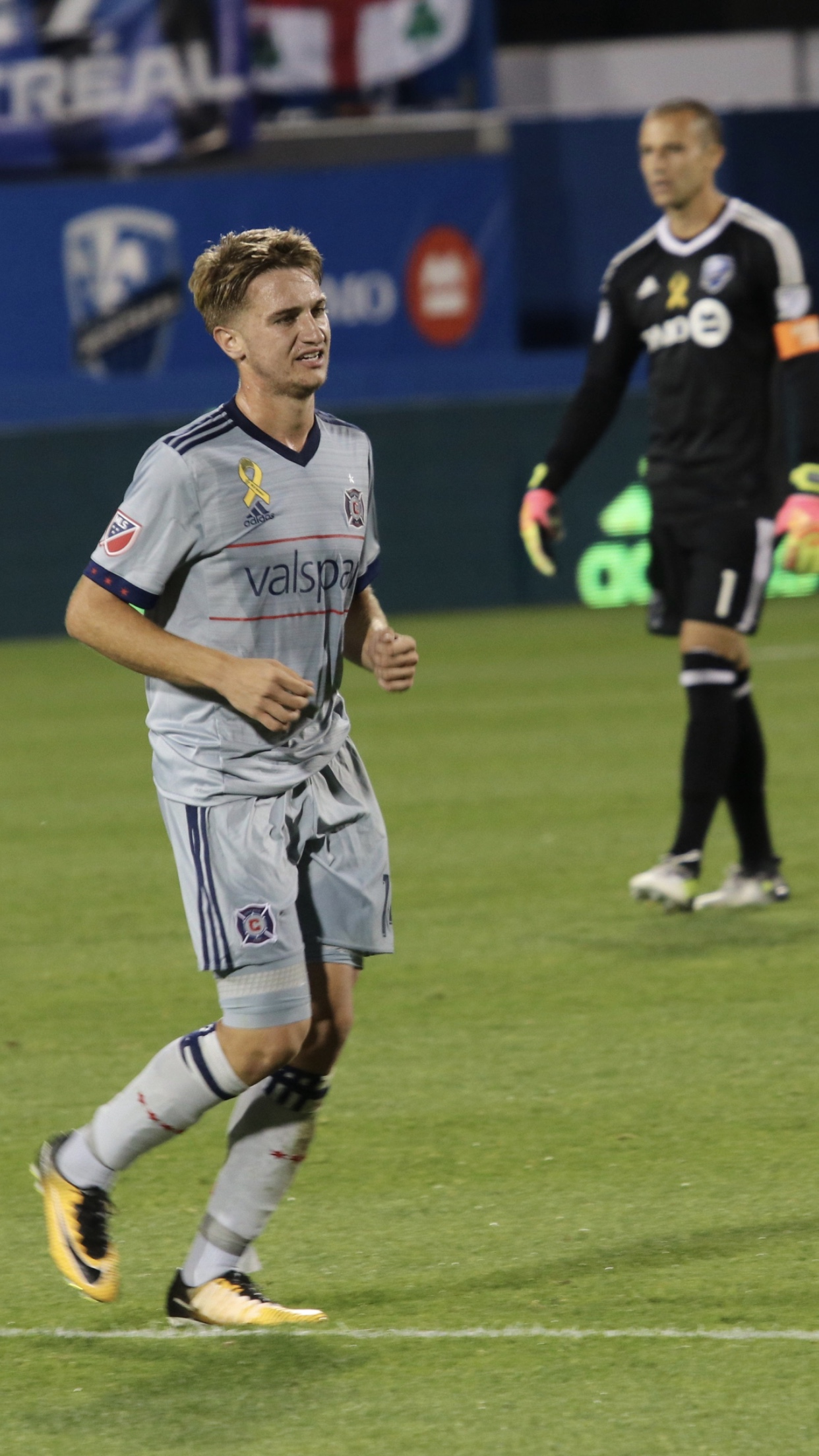
Chicago Fire FC homegrown Djordje Mihailovic is currently playing for the Toronto FC. He has earned 11 caps for the USMNT

Player	Current club	Year signed
(United States) Victor Pineda	retired	2010
(United States) Kellen Gulley	retired	2012
(United States) Chris Ritter	retired	2014
(United States) Harry Shipp	retired	2014
(United States) Patrick Doody	retired	2015
(Peru) Collin Fernandez	(United States) Spokane Velocity	2015
(United States) Joey Calistri	retired	2016
(United States) Drew Conner	retired	2016
(United States) **Djordje Mihailovic**	(Canada) Toronto FC	2017
(United States) Grant Lillard	retired	2018
(United States) Jeremiah Gutjahr	retired	2019
(United States) Andre Reynolds II	retired	2019
**(United States) Gabriel Slonina**	(England) Chelsea	2019
(United States) Nicholas Slonina	retired	2019
(United States) Chris Brady	(United States) Chicago Fire	2020
(United States) Javier Casas	retired	2020
(Mexico) Brian Gutiérrez	(Mexico) Guadalajara	2020
(Philippines) Alex Monis	(United States) CT United	2020
(United States) Mauricio Pineda	(United States) Chicago Fire	2020
(United States) Allan Rodriguez	retired	2020
(United States) Victor Bezerra	retired	2021
(United States) Sergio Oregel	(United States) Chicago Fire	2021
(United States) Missael Rodríguez	(United States) Sporting Kansas City II	2021
(United States) Justin Reynolds	(United States) Sporting Kansas City	2023
(United States) Dylan Borso	(Scotland) Greenock Morton (on loan from (United States) Chicago Fire)	2025
(United States) Robert Turdean	(United States) Chicago Fire	2025
(United States) Christopher Cupps	(Scotland) Greenock Morton (on loan from (United States) Chicago Fire)	2025
(United States) Sam Williams	(United States) Colorado Springs Switchbacks (on loan from (United States) Chicago Fire)	2025

=== Chivas USA (defunct) ===
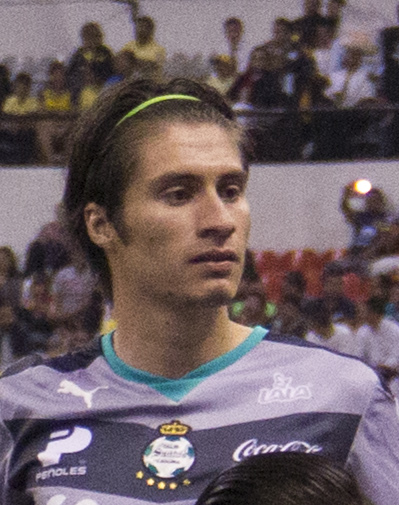
Chivas USA homegrown Jorge Villafaña earned 21 caps with the USMNT.

Player	Current club	Year signed
(United States) **Jorge Villafaña**	retired	2007
(El Salvador) **Gerson Mayén**	(El Salvador) Limeño	2008
(United States) César Zamora	retired	2009
(United States) Bryan de la Fuente	retired	2010
(United States) Chris Cortez	retired	2011
(United States) **Mark Delgado**	(United States) Los Angeles FC	2012
(United States) Caleb Calvert	retired	2013

=== FC Cincinnati ===
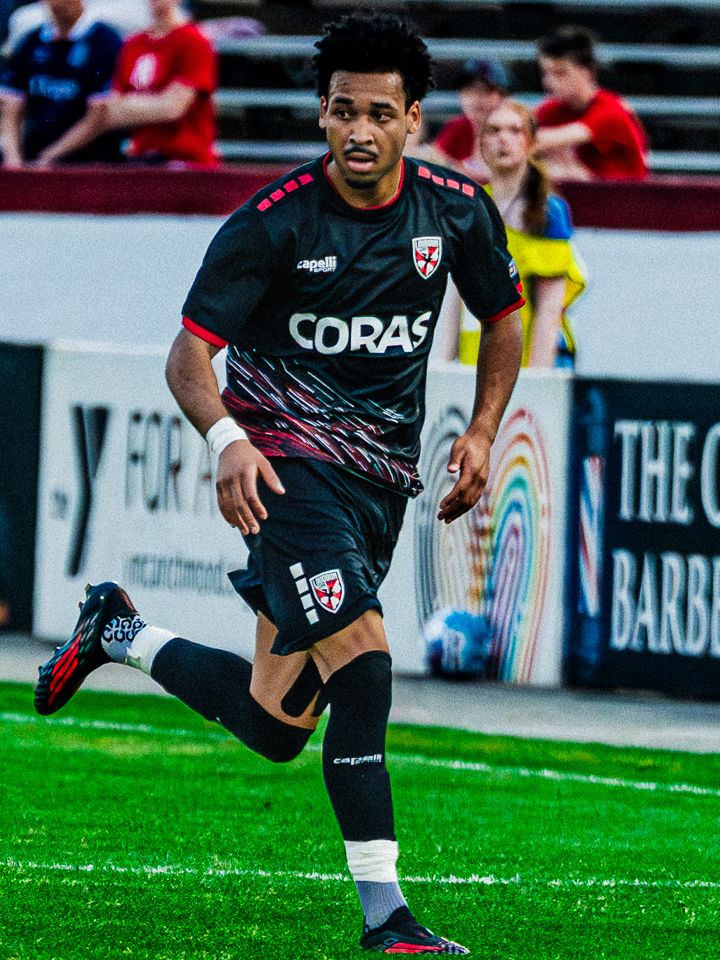
Arquímides Ordóñez helped win the 2023 Supporters' Shield and has earned 12 caps for Guatemala.

Player	Current club	Year signed
(Philippines) Zico Bailey	(United States) New Mexico United	2020
(United States) Beckham Sunderland	retired	2020
(Guatemala) **Arquímides Ordóñez**	(United States) FC Tulsa	2021
(United States) Harrison Robledo		2022
(United States) Stiven Jimenez	(Brazil) Fluminense (on loan from (United States) FC Cincinnati)	2023
(United States) Malik Pinto	(United States) Brooklyn FC	2023
(United States) Paul Walters	(United States) FC Cincinnati	2023
(United States) Gerardo Valenzuela	(United States) FC Cincinnati	2023
(Romania) Ștefan Chirilă	(United States) FC Cincinnati	2025
(Mexico) Ademar Chávez	(United States) FC Cincinnati	2026
(United States) Andrei Chirilă	(United States) FC Cincinnati	2026
(United States) Connor Dale	(United States) FC Cincinnati	2026

=== Colorado Rapids ===
Player	Current club	Year signed
(United States) Davy Armstrong	retired	2010
(United States) Josh Janniere	retired	2011
(United States) Dillon Serna	retired	2012
(United States) Shane O'Neill		2012
(United States) Kortne Ford	retired	2017
(United States) **Cole Bassett**	(United States) Portland Timbers	2018
(United States) **Sam Vines**	(United States) Houston Dynamo	2018
(United States) Sebastian Anderson	(United States) Hartford Athletic	2019
(United States) Matt Hundley	retired	2019
(United States) Abraham Rodriguez		2019
(United States) Michael Edwards	(United States) Oakland Roots	2019
(Mexico) Ricardo Pérez	retired	2019
(United States) Sam Raben	retired	2019
(United States) Will Vint	retired	2020
(United States) Darren Yapi	(United States) Colorado Rapids	2020
(United States) Oliver Larraz	(Canada) Vancouver Whitecaps	2021
(United States) Dantouma Toure		2021
(United States) Jackson Travis	(United States) Colorado Rapids	2022
(United States) Adam Beaudry	(United States) Colorado Rapids	2024
(United States) Sam Bassett	(United States) Pittsburgh Riverhounds	2025
(United States) Zack Campagnolo	(United States) St. Louis City (on loan from (United States) Colorado Rapids)	2026

=== Columbus Crew ===
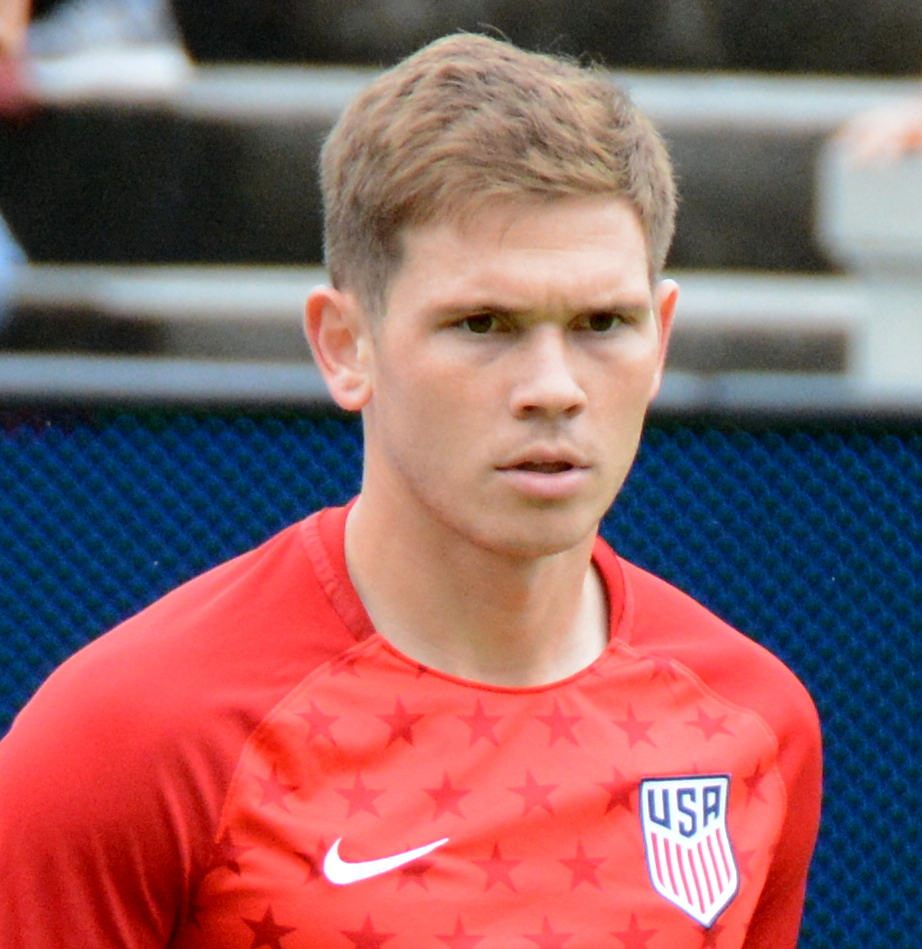
Columbus Crew homegrown Wil Trapp is a 2016 MLS All-Star. He earned 20 caps with the USMNT.

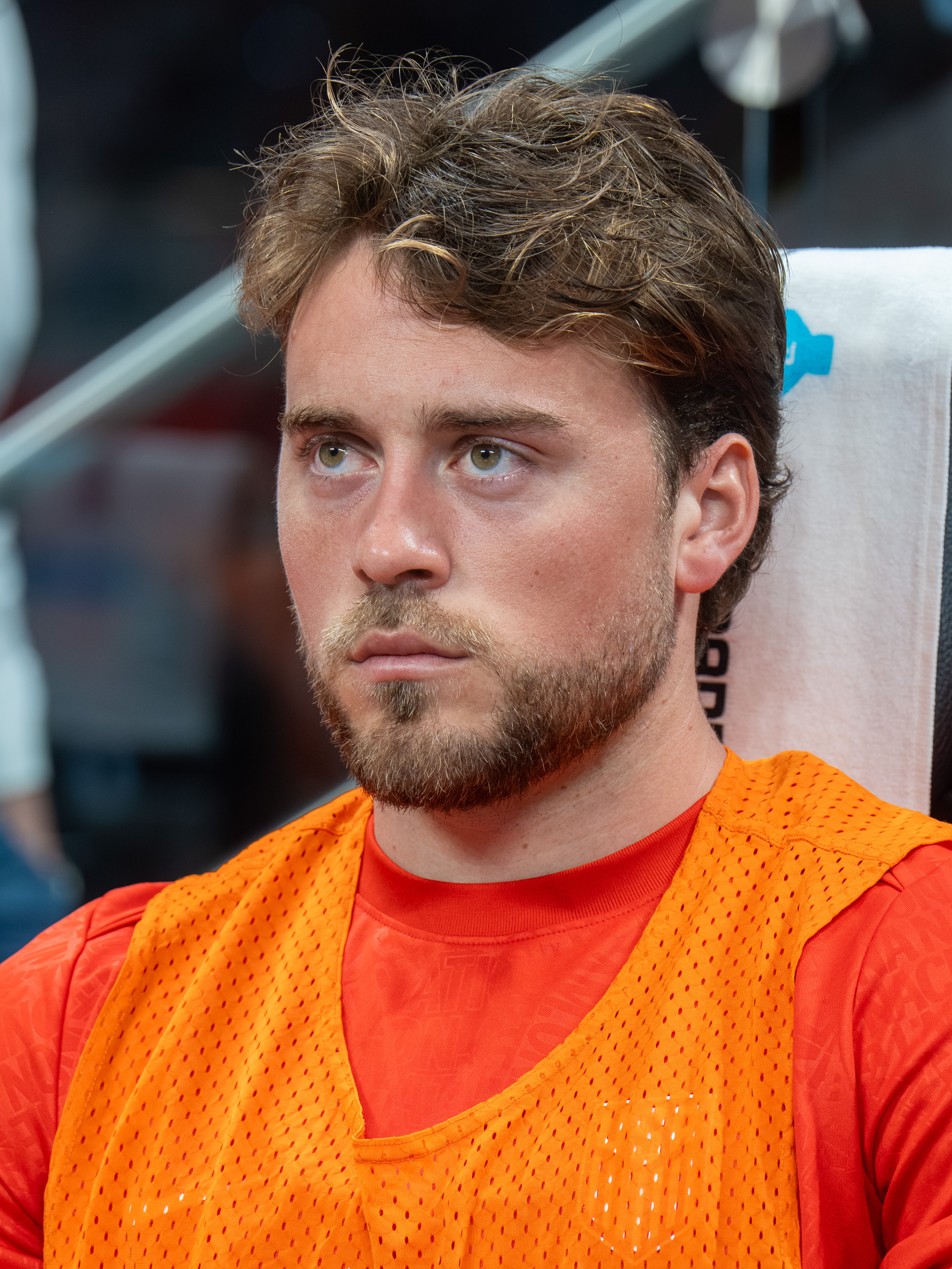
Aidan Morris is a 2023 MLS All-Star. He has earned 14 caps with the USMNT.

Player	Current club	Year signed
(United States) Aaron Horton	(Germany) SV Mösbach	2011
(United States) Matt Lampson	retired	2012
(United States) Ben Speas	retired	2012
(United States) Chad Barson	retired	2013
(United States) Kyle Hyland	retired	2013
(United States) **Wil Trapp**	(United States) Minnesota United	2013
(United States) Ross Friedman	retired	2014
(United States) Matt Walker	retired	2014
(United States) Matt Wiet	retired	2014
(United States) Ben Swanson	retired	2015
(United States) Alex Crognale	(United States) San Antonio FC	2017
(Guinea) **Aboubacar Keita**	(Sweden) Kalmar FF	2019
(United States) **Sebastian Berhalter**	(England) Middlesbrough	2020
(United States) **Aidan Morris**	(England) Middlesbrough	2020
(United States) Isaiah Parente	(United States) LA Galaxy	2021
(United States) Jake Morris	(United States) Louisville City	2022
(United States) **Sean Zawadzki**	(United States) Columbus Crew	2022
(United States) Will Sands	(United States) New England Revolution	2022
(Canada) **Jacen Russell-Rowe**	(France) Toulouse	2022
(United States) Keegan Hughes		2023
(United States) Taha Habroune	(United States) Columbus Crew	2024
(Philippines) **Cole Mrowka**	(United States) Columbus Crew	2024
(Belarus) Stanislav Lapkes	(United States) Columbus Crew	2025
(United States) Tristan Brown	(United States) Columbus Crew	2025
(United States) Quinton Elliot	(United States) Columbus Crew	2026
(United States) Owen Presthus	(United States) Nashville SC (on loan from (United States) Columbus Crew)	2026
(United States) Chase Adams	(United States) Columbus Crew	2026

=== FC Dallas ===
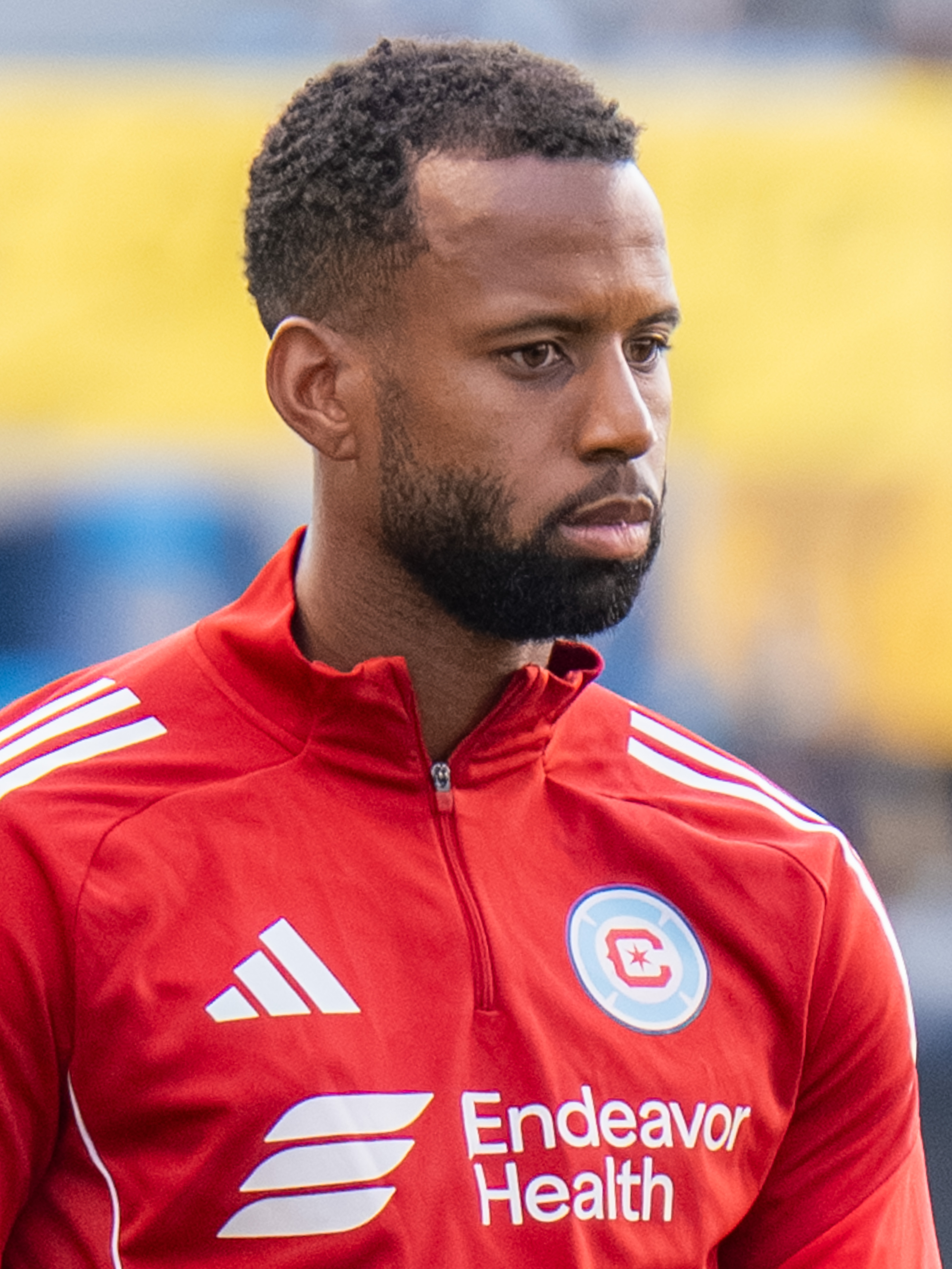
Kellyn Acosta is a 2017 MLS All-Star. He earned 58 caps with the USMNT and was chosen for the 2022 FIFA World Cup squad.

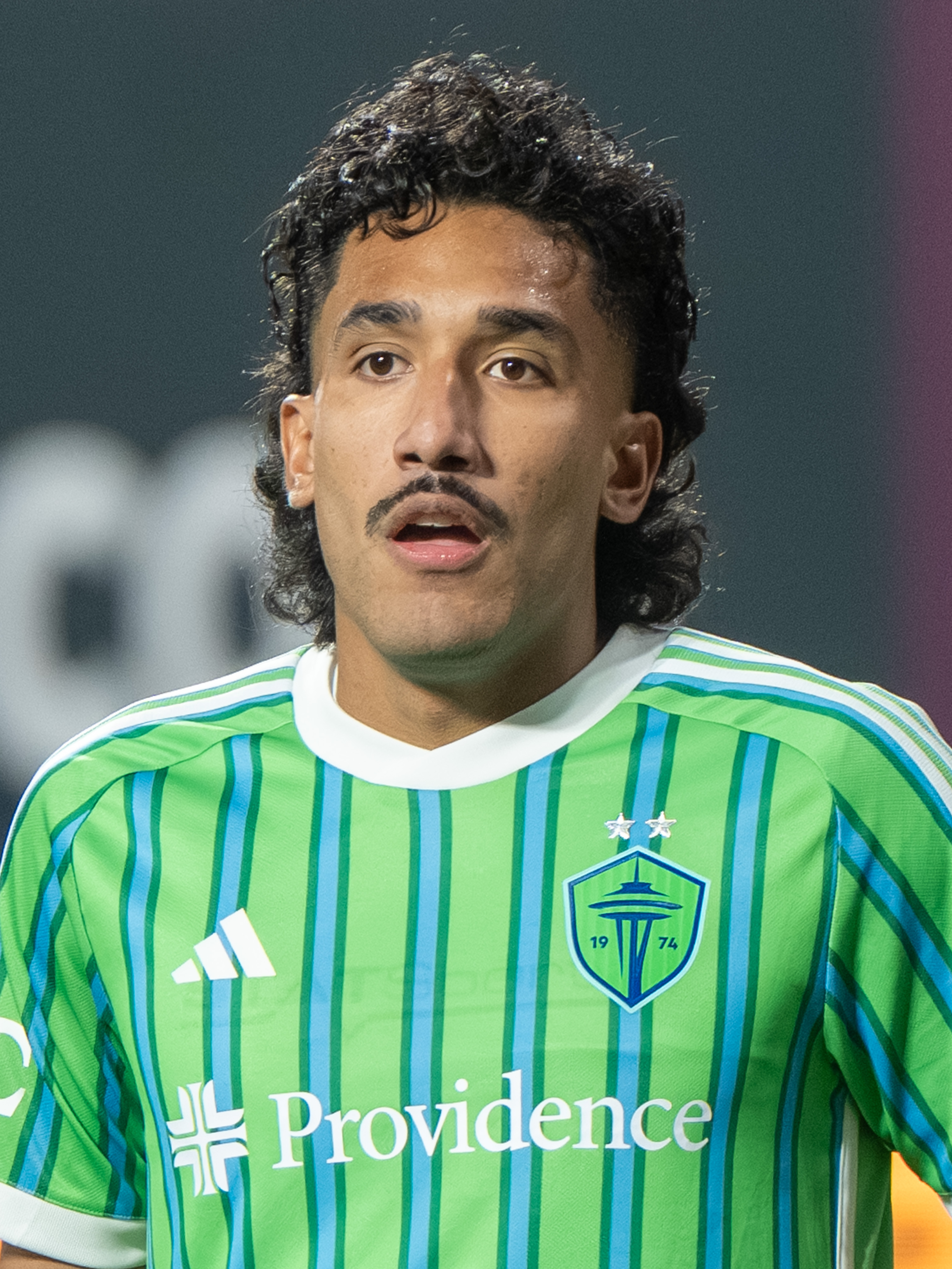
Jesús Ferreira is a 2x MLS All-Star. In 2022, he was named MLS Young Player of the Year and was selected to the MLS Best XI. He has earned 23 caps with the USMNT, having been selected to the 2022 FIFA World Cup squad.

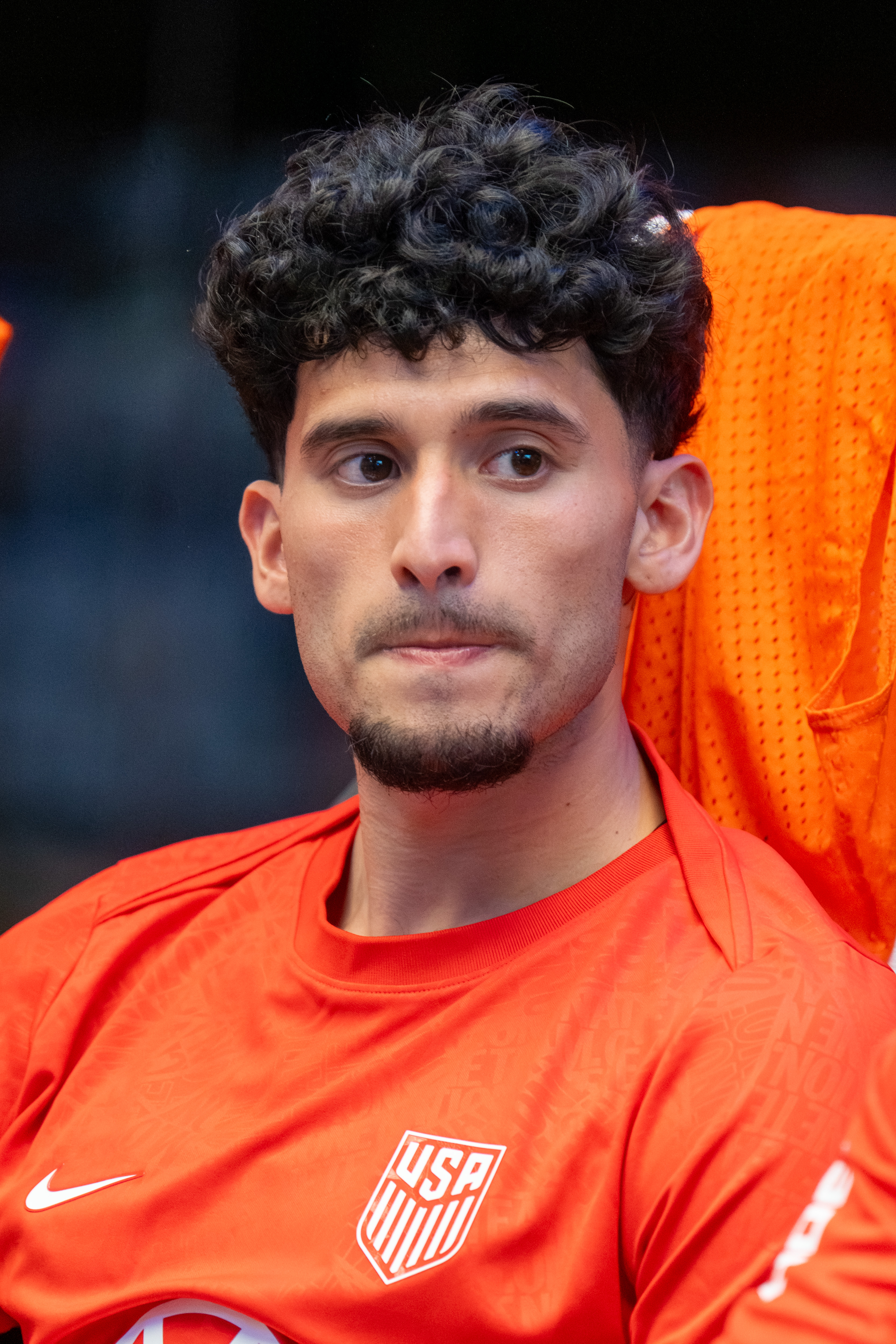
In 2021, Ricardo Pepi was named an MLS All-Star and won the MLS Young Player of the Year Award. He has earned 35 caps with the USMNT.

Player	Current club	Year signed
(Mexico) Bryan Leyva	retired	2009
(Mexico) Rubén Luna	retired	2010
(Guatemala) **Moisés Hernández**	retired	2010
(Mexico) Víctor Ulloa	retired	2011
(Guatemala) Jonathan Top	retired	2011
(Mexico) Richard Sánchez	(United States) San Antonio FC	2011
(United States) **Kellyn Acosta**	(Poland) Pogoń Szczecin	2013
(United States) Bradlee Baladez	retired	2013
(United States) Coy Craft	retired	2013
(United States) Danny Garcia	retired	2013
(United States) Jesse González	retired	2013
(United States) London Woodberry	retired	2013
(United States) **Alejandro Zendejas**	(Mexico) América	2015
(Mexico) Aarón Guillén	(United States) Las Vegas Lights	2016
(United States) **Paxton Pomykal**		2016
(United States) **Reggie Cannon**	(United States) Colorado Rapids	2017
(United States) **Jesús Ferreira**	(United States) Seattle Sounders	2017
(United States) **Bryan Reynolds**	(France) Rennes	2017
(United States) Jordan Cano	retired	2018
(United States) Kris Reaves	retired	2018
(United States) Thomas Roberts	(United States) Sporting JAX	2018
(United States) **Chris Richards**	(England) Crystal Palace	2018
(United States) **Brandon Servania**	(United States) D.C. United	2018
(United States) Edwin Cerrillo	(Mexico) América	2019
(United States) **Ricardo Pepi**	(Netherlands) PSV	2019
(Trinidad and Tobago) Dante Sealy	(Canada) CF Montréal	2019
(Mexico) Carlos Avilez		2020
(United States) Justin Che	(United States) New York Red Bulls	2020
(United States) Eddie Munjoma	(United States) Forward Madison	2020
(Bosnia and Herzegovina) Beni Redžić	(Bosnia and Herzegovina) Velež Mostar	2020
(United States) **Tanner Tessmann**	(France) Lyon	2020
(United States) Kalil ElMedkhar	(United States) FC Tulsa	2021
(United States) Collin Smith	(United States) Phoenix Rising	2021
(United States) Antonio Carrera	(Mexico) Tigres UANL	2022
(Jamaica) Tarik Scott	(United States) Lexington SC	2023
(United States) Nolan Norris	(United States) FC Dallas	2023
(United States) Alejandro Urzua		2024
(United States) Malik Henry-Scott	(United States) Lexington SC	2024
(United States) Michael Collodi	(United States) FC Dallas	2025
(Jamaica) Malachi Molina	(United States) Huntsville City (on loan from (United States) FC Dallas)	2025
(United States) Diego García	(United States) FC Dallas	2025
(Mexico) Anthony Ramirez	(United States) Atlético Dallas	2025
(Poland) Daniel Baran	(United States) FC Dallas	2025
(United States) Diego Pepi		2025
(United States) Josh Torquato	(United States) FC Dallas	2025
(United States) Caleb Swann	(United States) FC Dallas	2026
(Brazil) Kaka Scabin	(United States) FC Dallas	2026
(Honduras) Jaidyn Contreras	(United States) FC Dallas	2026
(United States) Slade Starnes	(United States) FC Dallas	2026
(United States) Benji Flowers	(United States) FC Dallas	2026

=== D.C. United ===
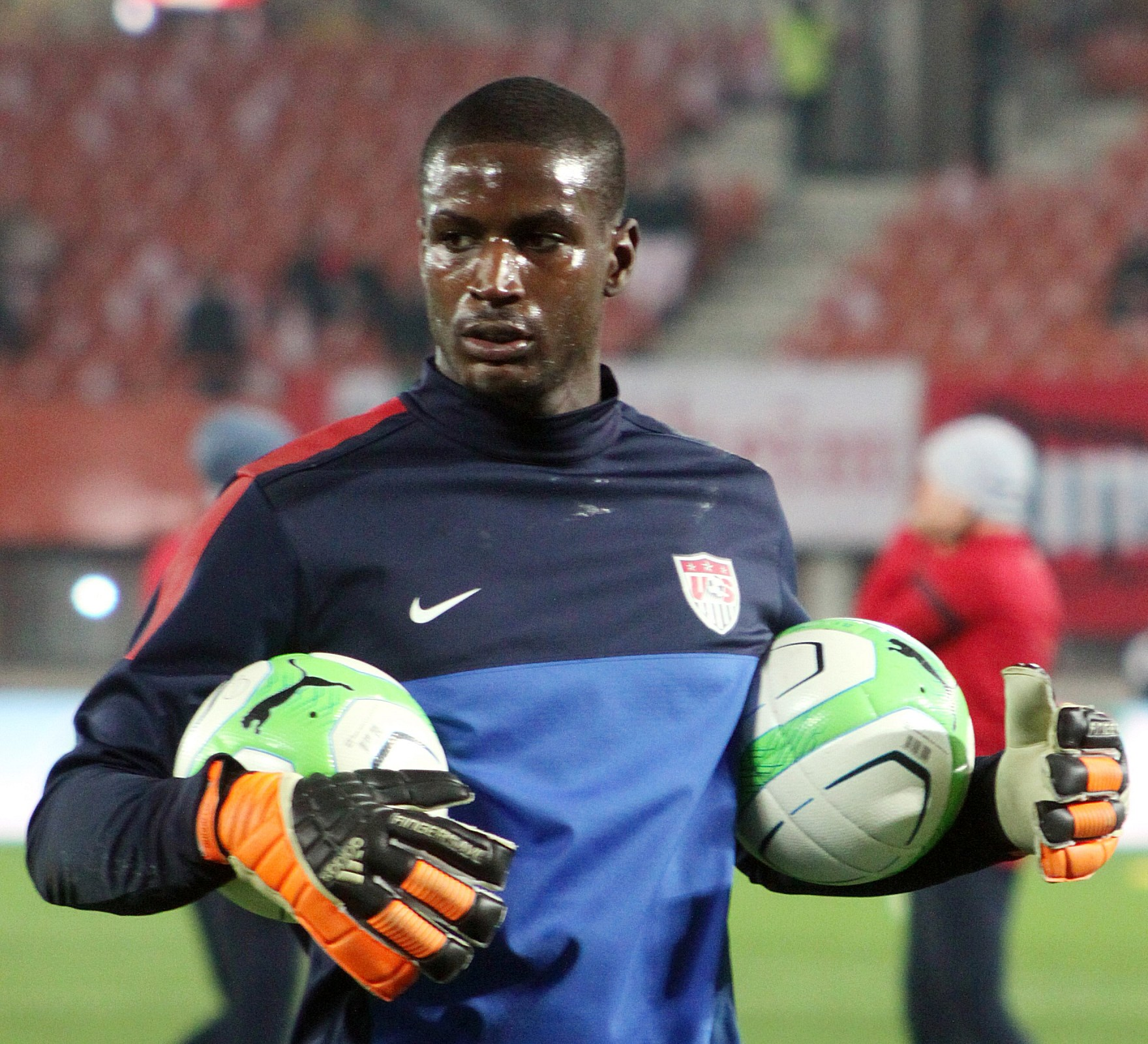
In 2014, Bill Hamid was named an MLS All-Star, named to the MLS Best XI, and won the MLS Goalkeeper of the Year Award. Hamid earned 8 caps with the USMNT.

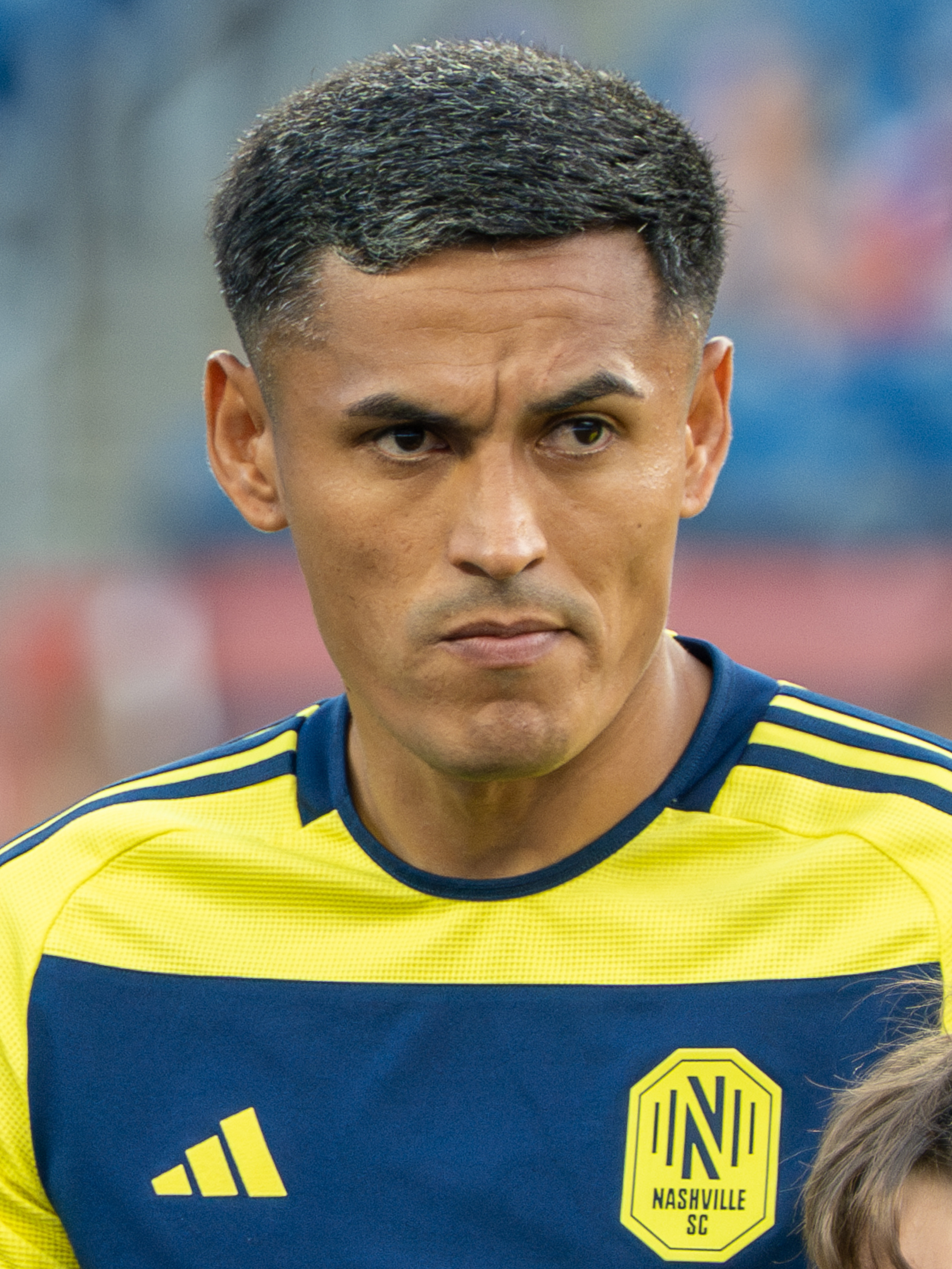
D.C. United homegrown player Andy Najar was named the 2010 MLS Rookie of the Year and earned 53 caps with Honduras.

Player	Current club	Year signed
(United States) **Bill Hamid**	(United States) Corpus Christi FC	2009
(United States) Conor Shanosky	retired	2010
(Honduras) **Andy Najar**	(United States) Nashville SC	2010
(United States) Ethan White	retired	2011
(Jamaica) **Michael Seaton**		2013
(United States) Jalen Robinson	retired	2014
(United States) Collin Martin	retired	2014
(United States) Chris Durkin	(United States) St. Louis City	2016
(United States) Ian Harkes	(United States) San Jose Earthquakes	2017
(Bolivia) **Antonio Bustamante**		2019
(United States) Moses Nyeman	(United States) Columbus Crew 2	2019
(United States) **Donovan Pines**	(Austria) Grazer AK	2019
(United States) Griffin Yow	(United States) New England Revolution	2019
(United States) **Kevin Paredes**	(Netherlands) FC Utrecht	2020
(El Salvador) **Jeremy Garay**	(United States) Fort Wayne FC	2021
(Trinidad and Tobago) Jacob Greene	(United States) Lexington SC	2021
(United States) Ted Ku-DiPietro	(United States) Colorado Rapids	2022
(United States) Jackson Hopkins	(United States) D.C. United	2022
(United States) Kristian Fletcher	(United States) FC Cincinnati	2022
(United States) Matai Akinmboni	(Scotland) Dundee (on loan from (England) AFC Bournemouth)	2022
(United States) Gavin Turner	(United States) D.C. United	2025
(United States) Oscar Avilez	(United States) D.C. United	2026
(Haiti) Grant Leveille	(United States) D.C. United	2026
(Dominican Republic) Kamil Castillo	(United States) D.C. United	2026

=== Houston Dynamo FC ===
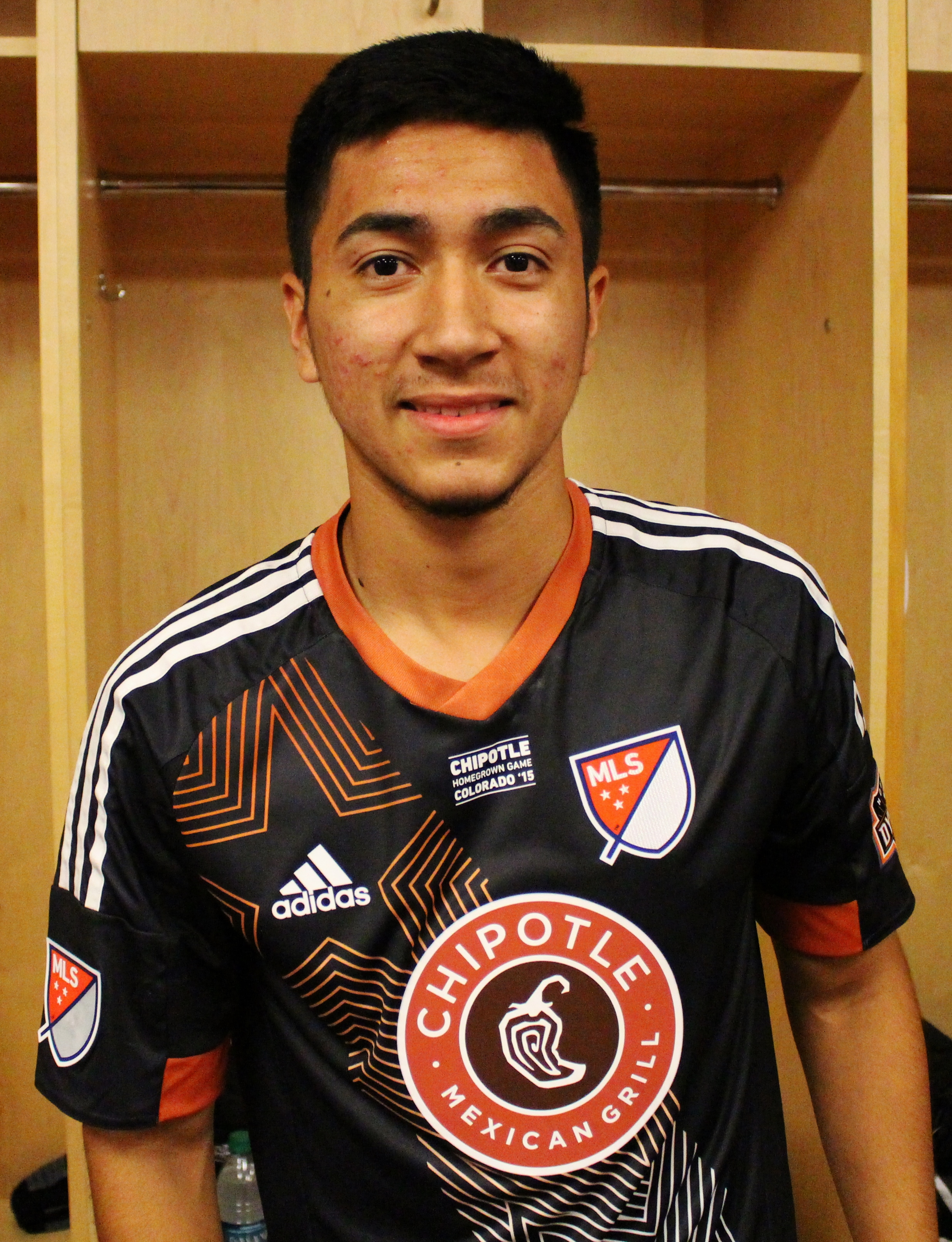
Memo Rodríguez played 202 MLS matches.

Player	Current club	Year signed
(United States) Tyler Deric	retired	2009
(United States) Francisco Navas	retired	2010
(United States) Alex Dixon	retired	2011
(United States) Josue Soto	retired	2011
(United States) Bryan Salazar	retired	2009
(United States) Memo Rodríguez	(United States) Sacramento Republic	2015
(United States) Bradley Bourgeois	retired	2016
(United States) Christian Lucatero	retired	2016
(Sweden) Erik McCue	(Sweden) Örebro	2019
(United States) Marcelo Palomino	(United States) Orange County SC	2019
(Colombia) Juan Castilla	(Colombia) Llaneros	2021
(El Salvador) **Danny Ríos**	retired	2021
(United States) Brooklyn Raines	(United States) New England Revolution	2022
(Dominican Republic) Xavier Valdez	(United States) Nashville SC	2022
(Nigeria) Mujeeb Murana	(United States) Richmond Kickers	2023
(United States) Kieran Sargeant	(United States) San Diego FC	2024
(United States) Sebastian Rodriguez	(United States) Houston Dynamo	2025
(United States) Logan Erb	(United States) Houston Dynamo	2026
(United States) Reese Miller	(United States) Houston Dynamo	2026
(Mexico) Matthew Arana	(United States) Houston Dynamo	2026
(United States) Mattheo Dimareli	(United States) Houston Dynamo	2026

=== Sporting Kansas City ===
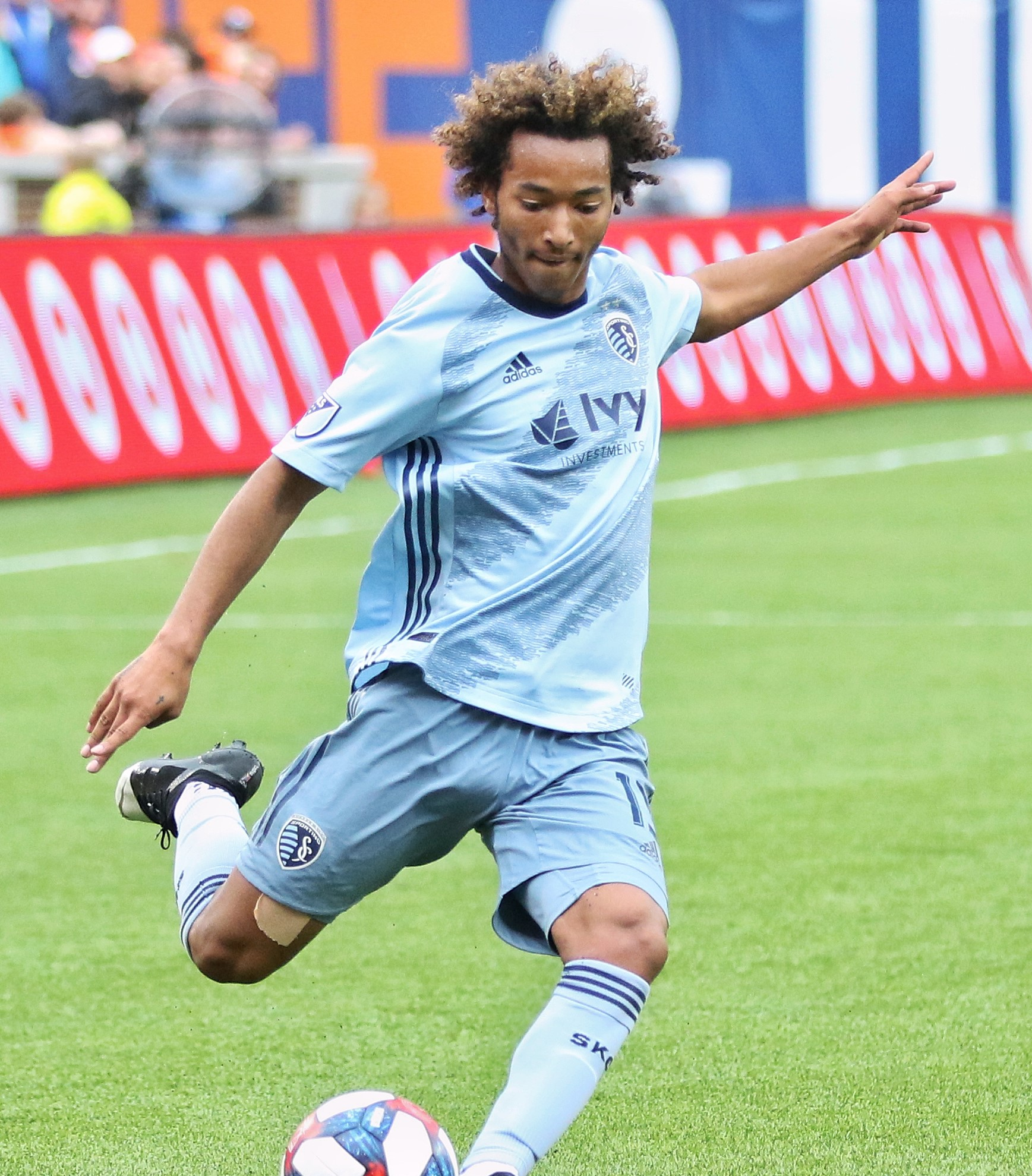
Gianluca Busio earned 17 caps with the USMNT.

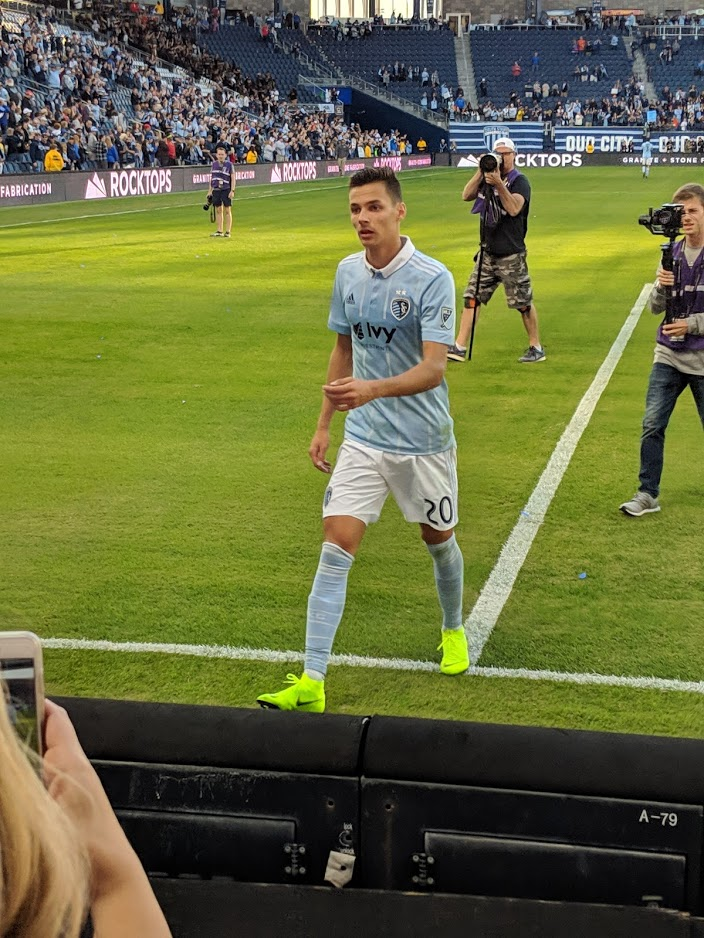
Dániel Sallói is a 2021 MLS All-Star. With over 170 appearances, he has more appearances for Sporting Kansas City than any other homegrown player for their organization.

Player	Current club	Year signed
(United States) Jon Kempin	retired	2010
(United States) Kevin Ellis	retired	2011
(United States) **Erik Palmer-Brown**	(Greece) Panathinaikos	2013
(Hungary) **Dániel Sallói**	(Canada) Toronto FC	2016
(United States) Jaylin Lindsey	(United States) New Mexico United	2017
(United States) **Gianluca Busio**	(Italy) Venezia	2018
(Malaysia) Wan Kuzain	(United States) Sporting JAX	2018
(United States) Matt Lewis	retired	2018
(United States) Zach Wright	retired	2018
(United States) Cameron Duke	(United States) Hartford Athletic	2019
(United States) Tyler Freeman	(United States) Richmond Kickers	2019
(United States) Wilson Harris	(United States) New England Revolution	2019
(United States) Felipe Hernández		2019
(United States) John Pulskamp		2020
(United States) Grayson Barber	retired	2021
(United States) Ozzie Cisneros	retired	2021
(United States) Jake Davis	(United States) Sporting Kansas City	2021
(United States) Kayden Pierre	(Belgium) Genk	2021
(United States) Kaveh Rad		2021
(United States) Brooks Thompson	(United States) Lexington SC	2021
(United States) Ian James	(United States) Sporting Kansas City	2025
(United States) Jack Kortkamp	(United States) Sporting Kansas City	2025
(United States) Jacob Bartlett	(United States) Sporting Kansas City	2025
(United States) Cielo Tschantret	(United States) Sporting Kansas City	2026
(Mexico) Zamir Loyo Reynaga	(United States) Sporting Kansas City	2027

=== LA Galaxy ===
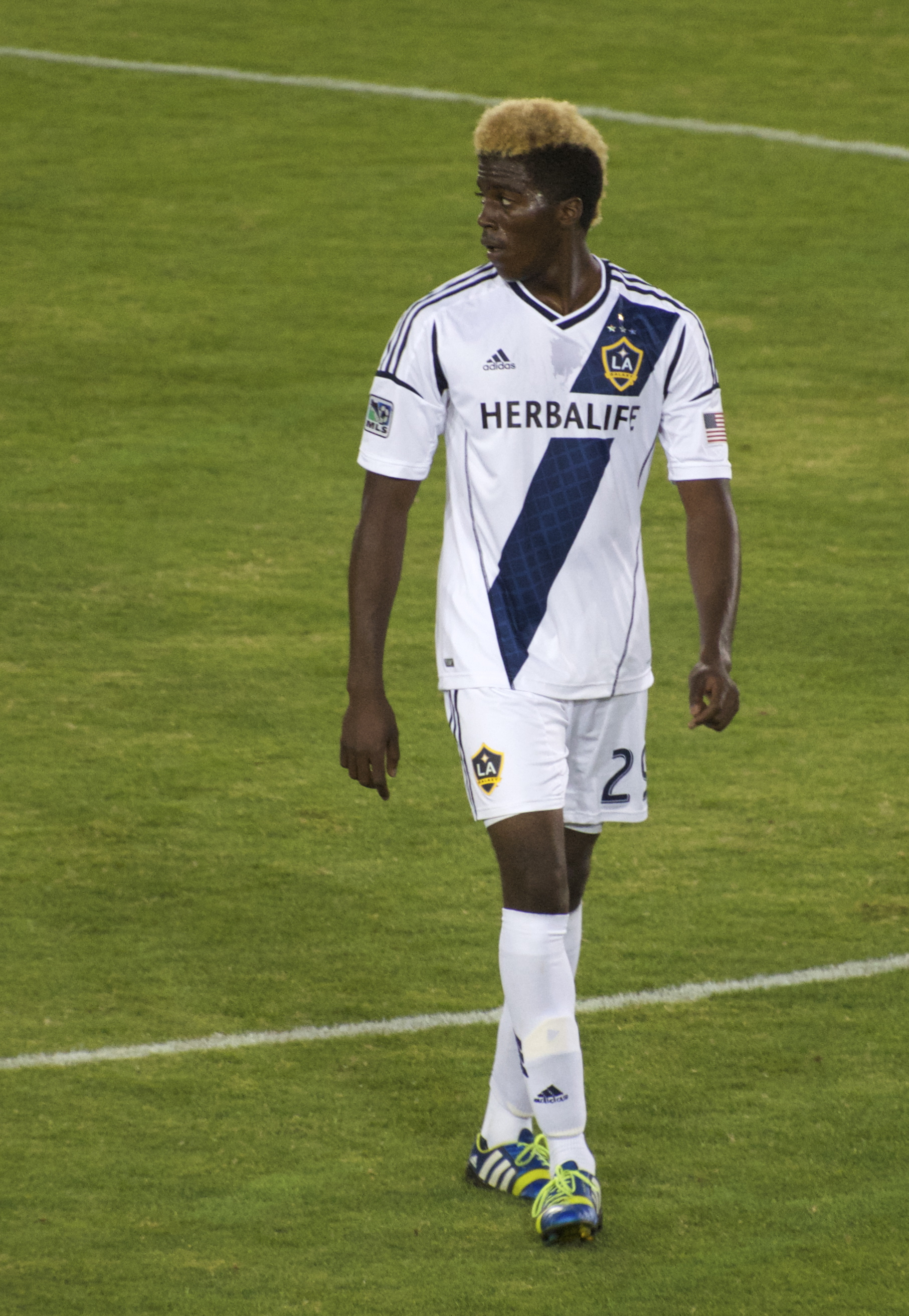
A 2015 MLS All-Star, Gyasi Zardes is the only homegrown player in MLS history to join the MLS 100 goal club. He earned 66 caps with the USMNT.

Player	Current club	Year signed
(United States) Tristan Bowen	retired	2009
(United States) Jack McBean	retired	2011
(United States) Jose Villarreal	retired	2012
(United States) Oscar Sorto	retired	2013
(United States) **Gyasi Zardes**	retired	2013
(Mexico) Raúl Mendiola	retired	2014
(United States) Bradford Jamieson IV	retired	2014
(Costa Rica) **Ariel Lassiter**	(United States) Portland Timbers	2015
(United States) Justin Dhillon		2017
(United States) Nathan Smith	retired	2017
(United States) Jaime Villarreal	retired	2017
(Mexico) **Efraín Álvarez**	(Mexico) Guadalajara	2018
(United States) Hugo Arellano	retired	2019
(United States) Ethan Zubak	(United States) Orange County SC	2019
(United States) Cameron Dunbar	(United States) Atlanta United 2	2020
(United States) Eric Lopez	retired	2020
(Mexico) Jonathan Perez	(Mexico) Guadalajara	2020
(Australia) Marcus Ferkranus	(Australia) Avondale FC	2021
**(United States) Jalen Neal**	(Canada) CF Montréal	2021
(United States) Adam Saldana		2021
(United States) Mauricio Cuevas	(Mexico) Santos Laguna	2023
(United States) Ruben Ramos Jr	(United States) LA Galaxy	2025
(United States) Harbor Miller	(United States) LA Galaxy	2025
(United States) Riley Dalgado	(United States) LA Galaxy	2026
(United States) Vicente Garcia	(United States) LA Galaxy	2027
(United States) Pepe Magaña	(United States) LA Galaxy	2027
(United States) Owen Pratt	(United States) LA Galaxy	2027

=== Los Angeles FC ===
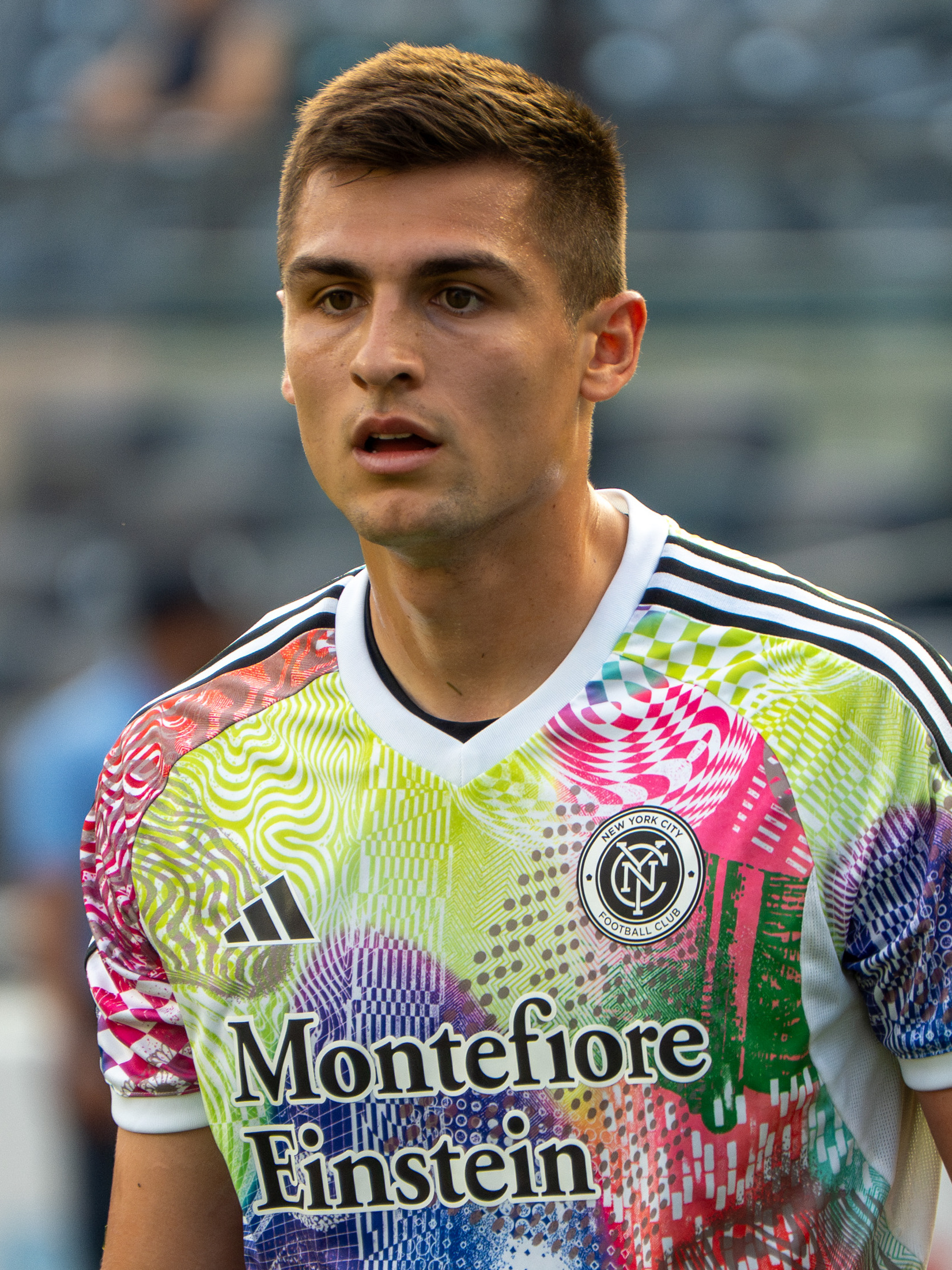
Tomás Romero has earned 18 caps with El Salvador.

Player	Current club	Year signed
(United States) Shaft Brewer Jr.	(Malta) Birkirkara	2018
(United States) Erik Dueñas	(Mexico) Querétaro	2020
(United States) Bryce Duke	(New Zealand) Wellington Phoenix	2020
(Mexico) Tony Leone	(Mexico) Pumas	2020
(Mexico) Christian Torres	(United States) Loudoun United (on loan from (Mexico) Tapatio)	2020
(El Salvador) **Tomás Romero**	(United States) New York City FC	2021
(El Salvador) **Nathan Ordaz**	(United States) D.C. United	2022
(United States) Bajung Darboe	(Germany) Bayern Munich II	2023
(Mexico) Diego Rosales	(Mexico) Guadalajara	2023
(United States) Luca Bombino	(England) Stoke City	2024
(Indonesia) **Adrian Wibowo**	(Austria) Wacker Innsbruck (on loan from (United States) Los Angeles FC)	2024
(United States) Jude Terry	(United States) Los Angeles FC	2025
(Guatemala) **Matt Evans**	(Austria) Wacker Innsbruck (on loan from (United States) Los Angeles FC)	2026
(United States) Cabral Carter	(United States) Los Angeles FC	2026
(United States) Christian Díaz	(United States) Los Angeles FC	2026

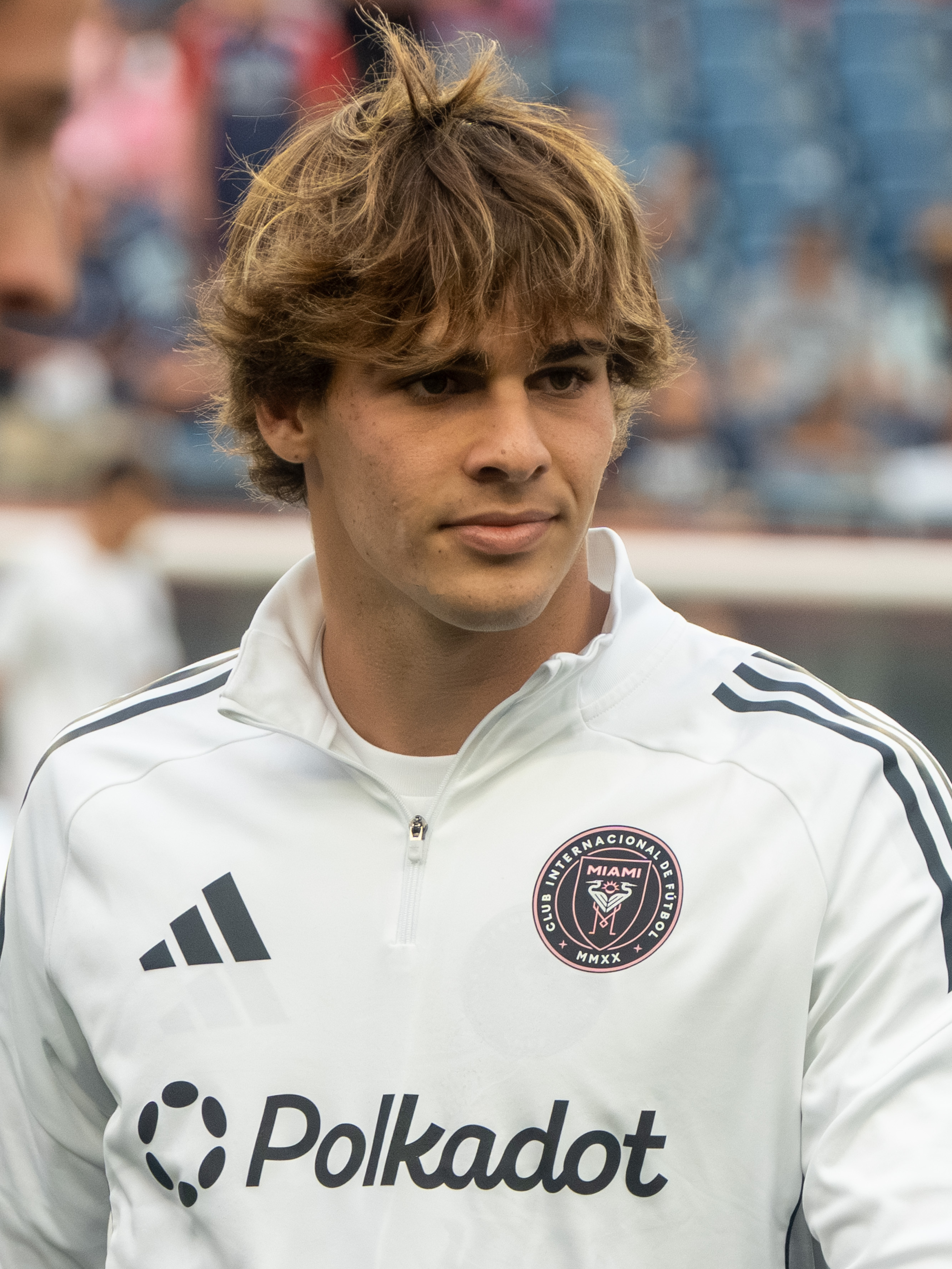
Benjamin Cremaschi has 3 caps with the USMNT and was voted the 2025 U.S. Soccer Young Male Player of the Year

=== Inter Miami CF ===
Player	Current club	Year signed
(United States) Drake Callender	(United States) Minnesota United	2020
(Dominican Republic) **Edison Azcona**	(United States) Las Vegas Lights	2021
(Jamaica) Ian Fray	(United States) Inter Miami	2021
(United States) Felipe Valencia		2021
(Greece) Noah Allen	(United States) Inter Miami	2022
(United States) **Benjamin Cremaschi**	(Italy) Parma	2023
(Haiti) **Shanyder Borgelin**	(Sweden) Varbergs BoIS	2023
(Honduras) David Ruiz	(United States) Inter Miami	2023
(United States) Santiago Morales	(United States) Inter Miami	2023
(United States) Tyler Hall	(United States) Inter Miami	2024
(Dominican Republic) Israel Boatwright	(United States) Inter Miami	2024
(United States) Dániel Pintér	(United States) Inter Miami	2026
(United States) Alexander Shaw	(United States) Inter Miami	2026
(United States) Cesar Abadia	(United States) Inter Miami	2026
(United States) Preston Plambeck	(United States) Inter Miami	2026
(United States) Daniel Sumalla	(United States) Inter Miami	2026

=== Minnesota United FC ===
Player	Current club	Year signed
(Luxembourg) Fred Emmings	retired	2020
(Liberia) Patrick Weah	(United States) Atlanta United 2	2021
(United States) Aziel Jackson	(United States) Minnesota United	2021
(United States) Devin Padelford	(United States) Minnesota United	2022
(United States) Darius Randell	(United States) Minnesota United	2025
(United States) Kayne Rizvanovich	(United States) Minnesota United	2026

=== CF Montréal ===
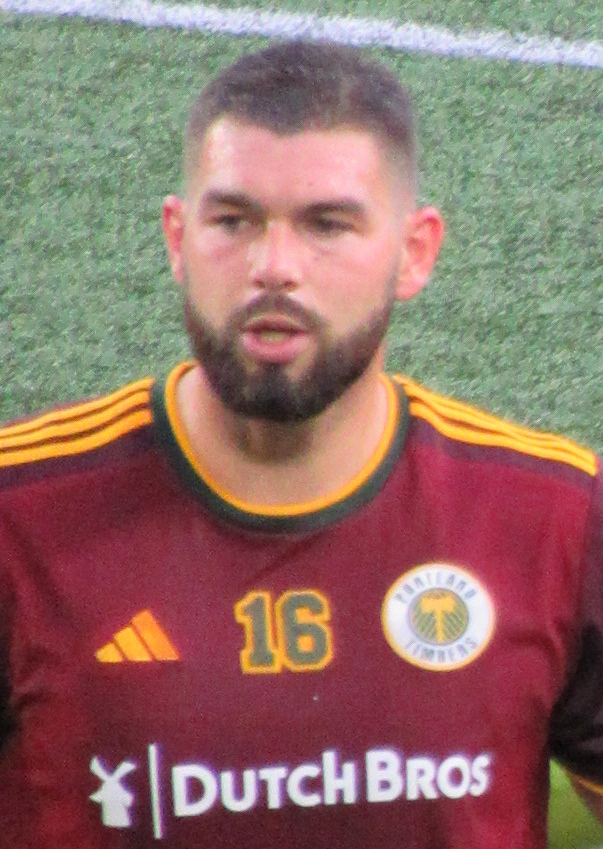
Maxime Crépeau has earned 30 caps with Canada.

Player	Current club	Year signed
(Canada) **Karl Ouimette**	retired	2012
(Canada) **Maxime Crépeau**	(United States) Orlando City	2013
(Canada) **Jérémy Gagnon-Laparé**		2013
(Canada) **Wandrille Lefèvre**	(Canada) AS Blainville	2013
(Canada) Zakaria Messoudi	retired	2013
(Canada) **Maxim Tissot**	retired	2013
(Canada) Louis Béland-Goyette	retired	2014
(Canada) **Anthony Jackson-Hamel**	retired	2014
(Canada) David Choinière	(Canada) FC Supra du Québec	2016
(Canada) **Ballou Tabla**	(Canada) Atlético Ottawa	2017
(Canada) Jason Beaulieu	retired	2018
(Canada) Mathieu Choinière	(United States) Los Angeles FC	2018
(Canada) Thomas Meilleur-Giguère	(Canada) HFX Wanderers	2018
(Canada) James Pantemis	(United States) Portland Timbers	2018
(Canada) Clément Bayiha	(Canada) FC Supra du Québec	2019
(Canada) Karifa Yao	(United States) Rhode Island FC	2019
(Canada) Tomas Giraldo		2020
(Canada) Keesean Ferdinand	(Canada) FC Supra du Québec	2020
(Canada) Jonathan Sirois	(United States) FC Dallas	2021
(Canada) Jean-Aniel Assi	(Canada) Atlético Ottawa	2021
(Canada) Sean Rea	(Canada) FC Supra du Québec	2021
(Canada) Nathan Saliba	(Spain) Villarreal	2021
(Canada) Rida Zouhir	(United States) Loudoun United	2021
(Canada) Alessandro Biello	(Canada) FC Supra du Québec	2024
(Canada) Owen Graham-Roache	(Canada) CF Montréal	2025
(Canada) Aleksandr Guboglo	(Canada) CF Montréal	2025
(Guatemala) Olger Escobar	(Canada) CF Montréal	2025
(Canada) Félix Samson	(Canada) CF Montréal	2026
(Canada) Josh-Duc Nteziryayo	(Canada) CF Montréal	2026
(Canada) Samsy Keita	(Canada) CF Montréal	2026

=== Nashville SC ===
Player	Current club	Year signed
(United States) Nick Hinds		2021
(United States) Ben Martino		2023
(United States) Adem Sipić	(Sweden) Gefle IF (on loan from (United States) Nashville SC)	2023
(Sierra Leone) Isaiah Jones	(United States) Chattanooga FC (on loan from (United States) Nashville SC)	2024
(United States) Chris Applewhite	(United States) Nashville SC	2025
(United States) Liam Stribling	(United States) Nashville SC	2027
(United States) Xavier Aguilar	(United States) Nashville SC	2027

=== New England Revolution ===
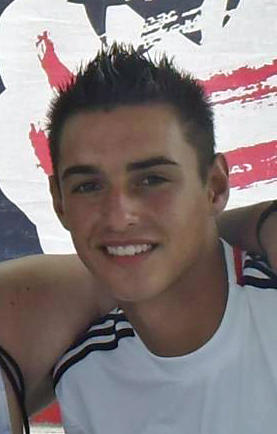
Diego Fagúndez is the first ever MLS homegrown player. He is one of only 13 players in MLS history to record 60 career goals and 60 career assists.

Player	Current club	Year signed
(Uruguay) Diego Fagúndez	(United States) New England Revolution	2010
(United States) Scott Caldwell	retired	2013
(Haiti) **Zachary Herivaux**	(United States) Rhode Island FC	2013
(Puerto Rico) **Isaac Angking**		2018
(Brazil) Nicolas Firmino	(United States) Lexington SC	2018
(United States) Justin Rennicks	(United States) New Mexico United	2019
(Guatemala) Damian Rivera	(United States) Phoenix Rising	2019
(England) Noel Buck	(United States) San Jose Earthquakes	2022
(Bosnia and Herzegovina) Esmir Bajraktarević	(Netherlands) PSV	2022
(United States) Jack Panayotou	(United States) Loudoun United (on loan from (United States) New England Revolution)	2023
(United States) Santiago Suárez	(United States) Birmingham Legion (on loan from (United States) New England Revolution)	2024
(United States) Peyton Miller	(United States) New England Revolution	2024
(United States) Malcolm Fry	(United States) New England Revolution	2024
(United States) Damario McIntosh	(United States) New England Revolution	2025
(United States) Eric Klein	(United States) New England Revolution	2025
(United States) Cristiano Oliveira	(United States) New England Revolution	2026
(United States) Judah Siqueira	(United States) New England Revolution	2026

=== New York City FC ===
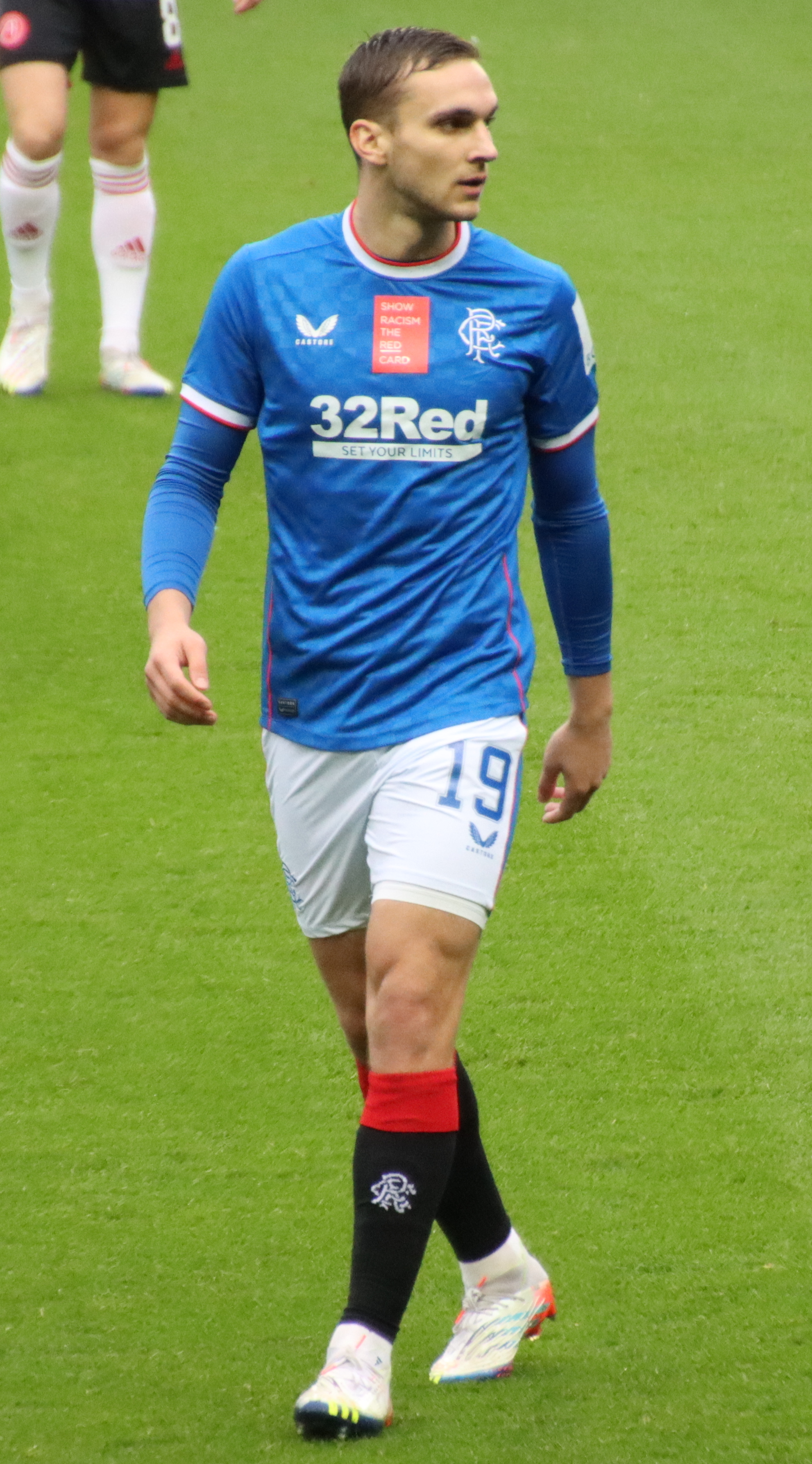
A 2021 MLS All-Star, James Sands has earned 14 caps with the USMNT.

Player	Current club	Year signed
(United States) **James Sands**	(United States) New York City FC	2017
**(United States) Joe Scally**	(Germany) Borussia Mönchengladbach	2018
(United States) Justin Haak	(United States) LA Galaxy	2019
(Jamaica) Tayvon Gray	(United States) New York City FC	2020
(United States) Andres Jasson	(Denmark) AaB	2020
(United States) Chris Gloster	(United States) New Mexico United	2021
(England) Christian McFarlane	(England) Manchester City	2021
(United States) Nico Benalcazar	(United States) Orange County SC	2022
(Mexico) Jonathan Jiménez	(United States) Westchester SC	2022
(Ghana) Samuel Owusu	(United States) Union Omaha	2022
(United States) Máximo Carrizo	(United States) New York City FC	2022
(United States) Jonny Shore	(United States) New York City FC	2023
(United States) Drew Baiera	(United States) New York City FC	2023
(Chile) Zidane Yáñez	(United States) Nashville SC	2024
(United States) Alex Rando	(United States) Orange County SC	2024
(United States) Prince Amponsah	(Canada) Whitecaps FC 2	2025
(United States) Jacob Arroyave	(United States) New York City FC	2025
(Jamaica) Seymour Reid	(United States) New York City FC	2025
(United States) Cooper Flax	(United States) New York City FC	2026
(United States) Kamran Acito	(United States) New York City FC	2026

=== New York Red Bulls ===
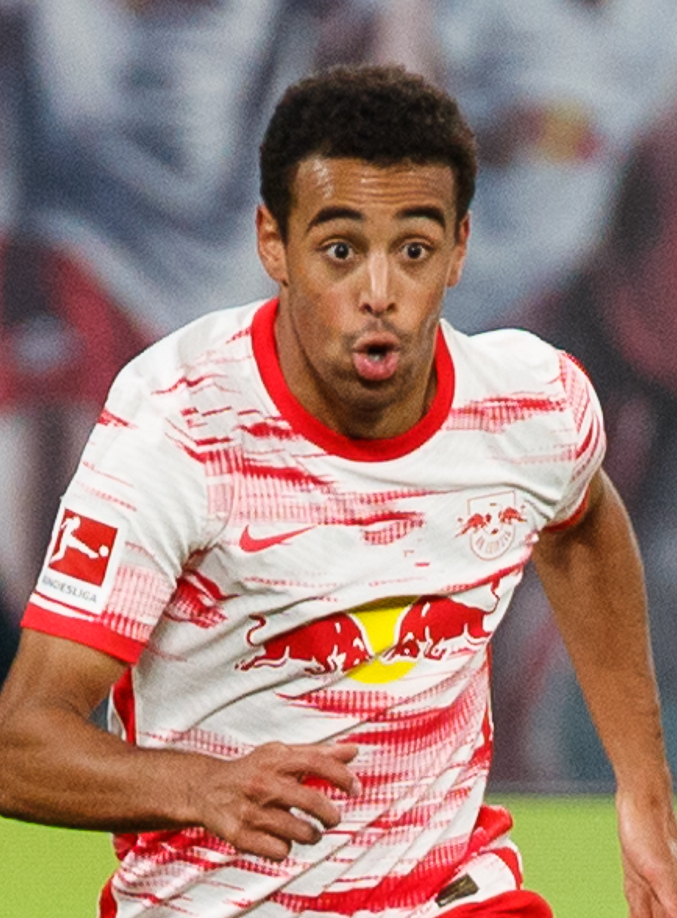
Tyler Adams was named the 2022 U.S. Soccer Player of the Year and he has earned 52 caps to the USMNT and was selected to the 2022 FIFA World Cup squad.

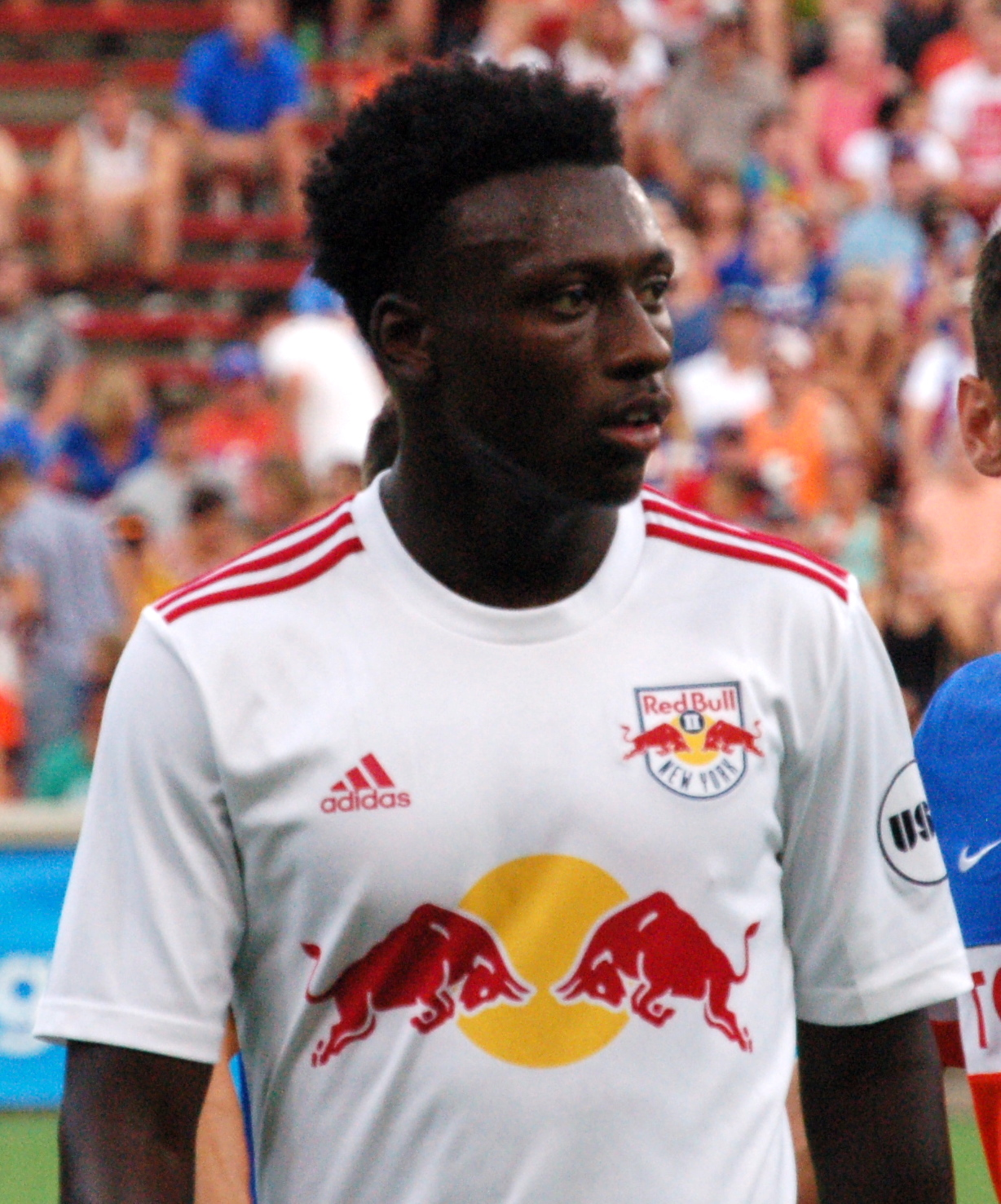
Derrick Etienne Jr. won the 2018 Supporters' Shield with the New York Red Bulls. He has earned 49 caps with the Haiti national team.

Player	Current club	Year signed
(Georgia (country)) Giorgi Chirgadze	retired	2010
(United States) **Juan Agudelo**	retired	2010
(United States) Šaćir Hot	retired	2011
(United States) Matt Kassel	retired	2011
(United States) Connor Lade	retired	2012
(United States) Santiago Castaño	retired	2013
(United States) **Matt Miazga**	(United States) New York City FC	2013
(El Salvador) **Amando Moreno**	(United States) El Paso Locomotive	2013
(United States) Sean Davis		2015
(United States) **Tyler Adams**	(England) AFC Bournemouth	2016
(United States) Brandon Allen	retired	2016
(United States) Mael Corboz	(France) Grenoble	2016
(Haiti) **Derrick Etienne**	(Canada) Toronto FC	2016
(United States) Alex Muyl	(United States) Nashville SC	2016
(United States) Scott Thomsen	retired	2016
(United States) Chris Thorsheim	retired	2016
(United States) Arun Basuljevic	retired	2017
(United States) Evan Louro	(United States) FC Cincinnati	2017
(United States) Ben Mines	(United States) Las Vegas Lights	2018
(United States) Kevin Politz	retired	2018
(United States) Omir Fernandez	(United States) Portland Timbers	2019
(Ivory Coast) Jean-Christophe Koffi	(Puerto Rico) Ponce FC	2019
(United States) Caden Clark	(United States) D.C. United	2020
(United States) **John Tolkin**	(Germany) Holstein Kiel	2020
(Portugal) Bento Estrela	(Portugal) Sporting CP	2021
(United States) Daniel Edelman	(United States) St. Louis City	2022
(United States) Zach Ryan	retired	2022
(United States) Serge Ngoma	(United States) Birmingham Legion (on loan from (United States) New York Red Bulls)	2022
(United States) Curtis Ofori	(Canada) Cavalry FC	2023
(United States) Jayden Reid	(United States) Sporting Kansas City	2023
(United States) Peter Stroud	(United States) Minnesota United	2023
(United States) Julian Hall	(United States) New York Red Bulls	2023
(United States) Davi Alexandre	(Spain) Benidorm	2024
(United States) Aidan Stokes	(United States) New York Red Bulls	2024
(Trinidad and Tobago) **Roald Mitchell**	(Denmark) Viborg FF	2024
(United States) Adri Mehmeti	(United States) New York Red Bulls	2025
(Antigua and Barbuda) Aiden Jarvis	(United States) New York Red Bulls	2025
(United States) Tobias Szewczyk	(United States) New York Red Bulls	2026
(United States) Matthew Dos Santos	(United States) New York Red Bulls	2026
(United States) Dennis Nelich	(United States) New York Red Bulls	2026
(Mali) Sekou Kone	(United States) New York Red Bulls	2026

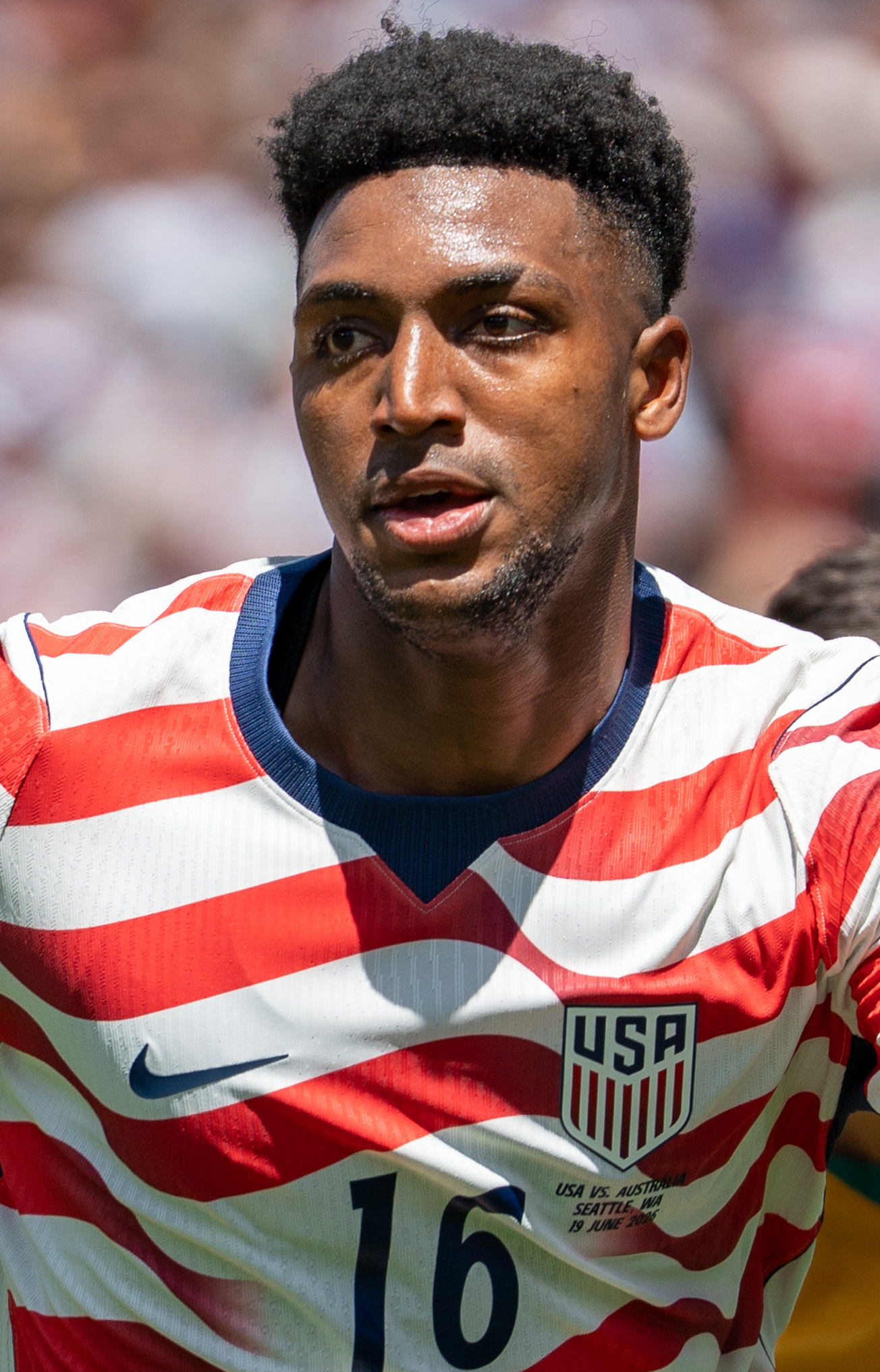
Alex Freeman has earned 22 caps for the USMNT and was named the 2025 MLS Young Player of the Year and selected for the 2025 MLS Best XI. Freeman has also represented the USMNT at the 2026 FIFA World Cup.

=== Orlando City SC ===
Player	Current club	Year signed
(United States) Tommy Redding	retired	2014
(England) Harrison Heath	retired	2015
(United States) Tyler Turner	(United States) St. Louis Ambush	2015
(United States) Mason Stajduhar	(United States) Real Salt Lake	2016
(United States) Cameron Lindley	(United States) Indy Eleven	2018
(United States) Benji Michel	(South Korea) Ulsan HD	2019
(United States) Michael Halliday		2020
(United States) David Loera		2020
(United States) Raul Aguilera	retired	2020
(United States) Jordan Bender	(United States) Sarasota Paradise	2020
(Puerto Rico) **Wilfredo Rivera**	(Argentina) Barracas Central	2021
(United States) Thomas Williams	(United States) Nashville SC	2021
(United States) **Alex Freeman**	(Spain) Villarreal	2022
(Chile) Favian Loyola	(Chile) Audax Italiano	2023
(Venezuela) **Javier Otero**	(United States) Orlando City	2023
(United States) Tahir Reid-Brown	(United States) St. Louis City	2024
(United States) Colin Guske	(United States) Real Salt Lake	2025
(Venezuela) Gustavo Caraballo	(United States) Orlando City	2025
(United States) Zakaria Taifi	(United States) Orlando City	2025
(United States) Justin Ellis	(United States) Orlando City	2026
(United States) Tristan Himes	(United States) Orlando City	2026
(Canada) Clovis Archange	(United States) Orlando City	2026
(Brazil) Bernardo Rhein	(United States) Orlando City	2026

=== Philadelphia Union ===
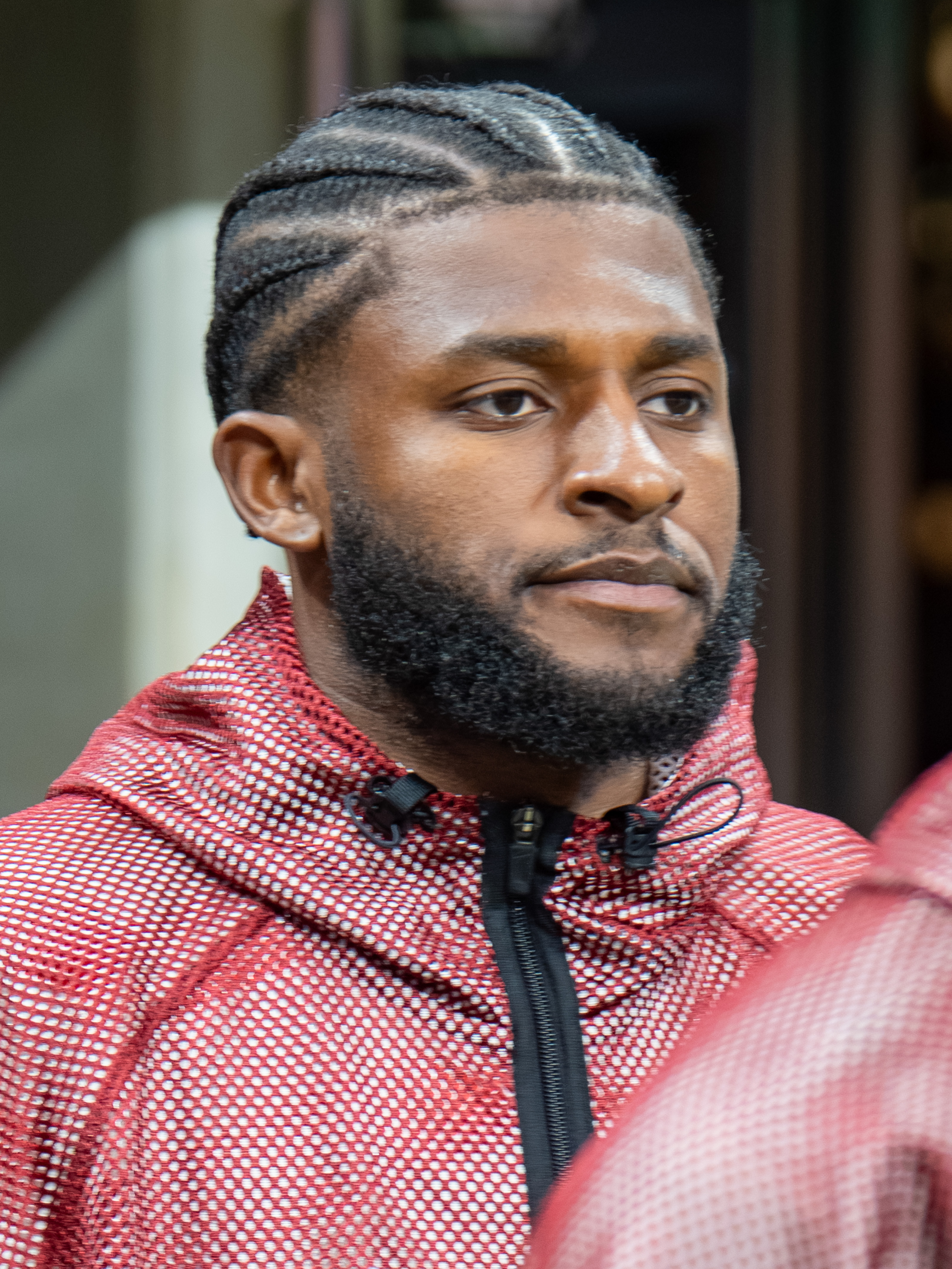
2022 MLS Best XI selection Mark McKenzie has earned 27 caps with the USMNT.

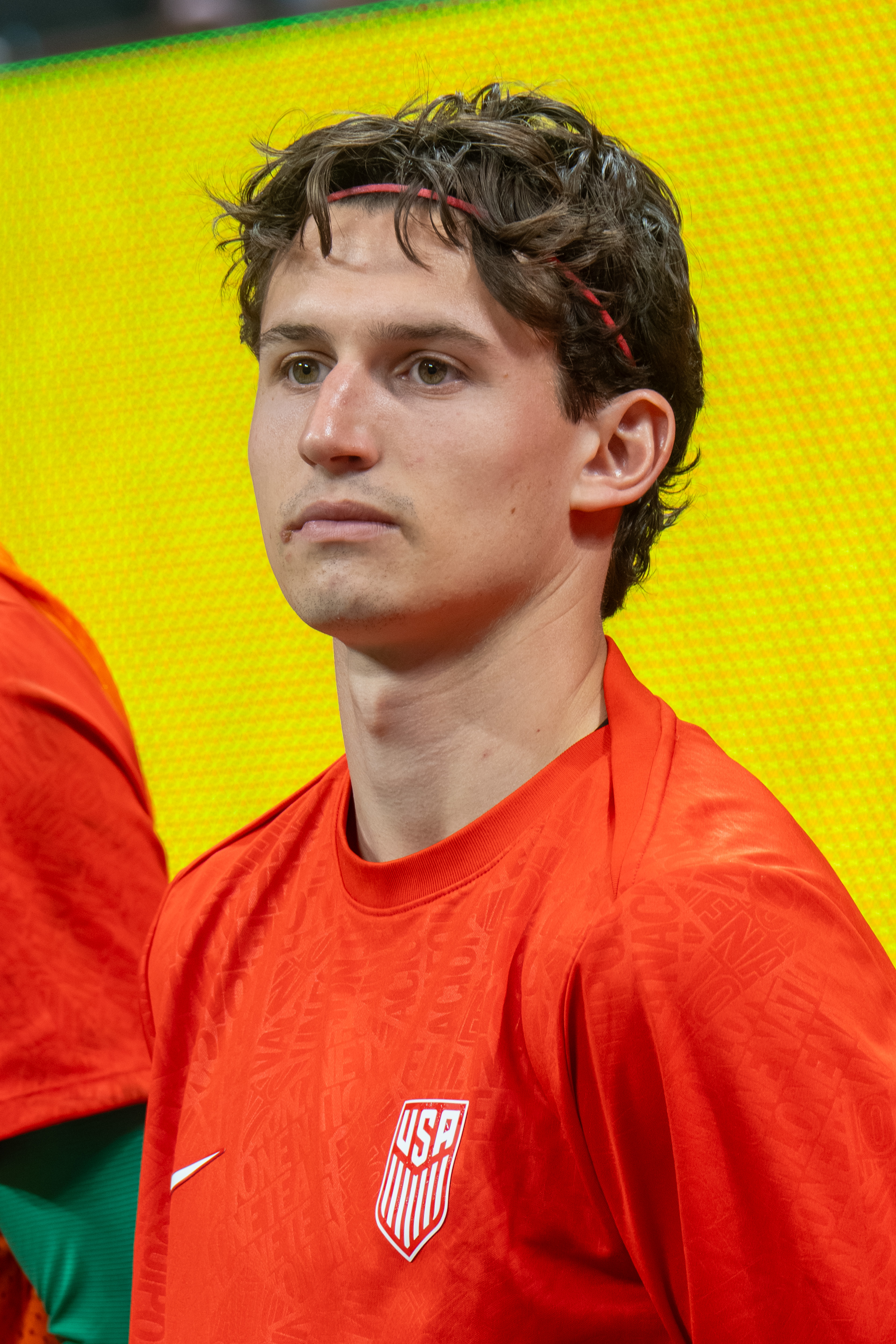
In 2020, Brenden Aaronson was named to the MLS Best XI. He has earned 57 caps with the USMNT and was selected to the 2022 FIFA World Cup squad.

Player	Current club	Year signed
(United States) Zach Pfeffer	retired	2011
(Mexico) Cristhian Hernández	retired	2012
(United States) Jimmy McLaughlin	retired	2012
(United States) Derrick Jones	banned	2016
(United States) **Auston Trusty**	(Scotland) Celtic	2016
(Afghanistan) **Adam Najem**	retired	2017
(United States) Anthony Fontana	(United States) Brooklyn FC	2018
(United States) **Mark McKenzie**	(France) Toulouse	2018
(United States) Matthew Real	(United States) Colorado Springs Switchbacks	2018
(United States) **Brenden Aaronson**	(England) Leeds United	2019
(United States) Matt Freese	(United States) New York City FC	2019
(United States) Jack de Vries	(Netherlands) Den Bosch	2020
(United States) Cole Turner		2020
(United States) **Paxten Aaronson**	(United States) Colorado Rapids	2021
(United States) Brandan Craig	(Canada) CF Montréal	2021
(United States) **Nathan Harriel**	(United States) Philadelphia Union	2021
(United States) **Jack McGlynn**	(England) Stoke City	2021
(United States) **Quinn Sullivan**	(United States) Philadelphia Union	2021
(United States) Anton Sorenson	(United States) Chattanooga FC	2022
(United States) Jeremy Rafanello	(United States) Philadelphia Union	2022
(Haiti) Nelson Pierre	(United States) FC Tulsa (on loan from (Canada) Vancouver Whitecaps)	2023
(United States) Nick Pariano	(United States) Huntsville City	2024
(United States) David Vazquez	(United States) San Diego FC	2024
(United States) Andrew Rick	(United States) Philadelphia Union	2024
(United States) Cavan Sullivan	(United States) Philadelphia Union	2024
(United States) CJ Olney	(United States) Brooklyn FC (on loan from (United States) Philadelphia Union)	2024
(United States) Neil Pierre	(United States) Philadelphia Union	2025
(United States) Frankie Westfield	(United States) Philadelphia Union	2025
(United States) Eddy Davis III	(United States) Loudoun United FC (on loan from (United States) Philadelphia Union)	2025
(Mexico) Sal Olivas	(United States) Philadelphia Union	2025
(United States) Malik Jakupovic	(United States) Philadelphia Union	2026

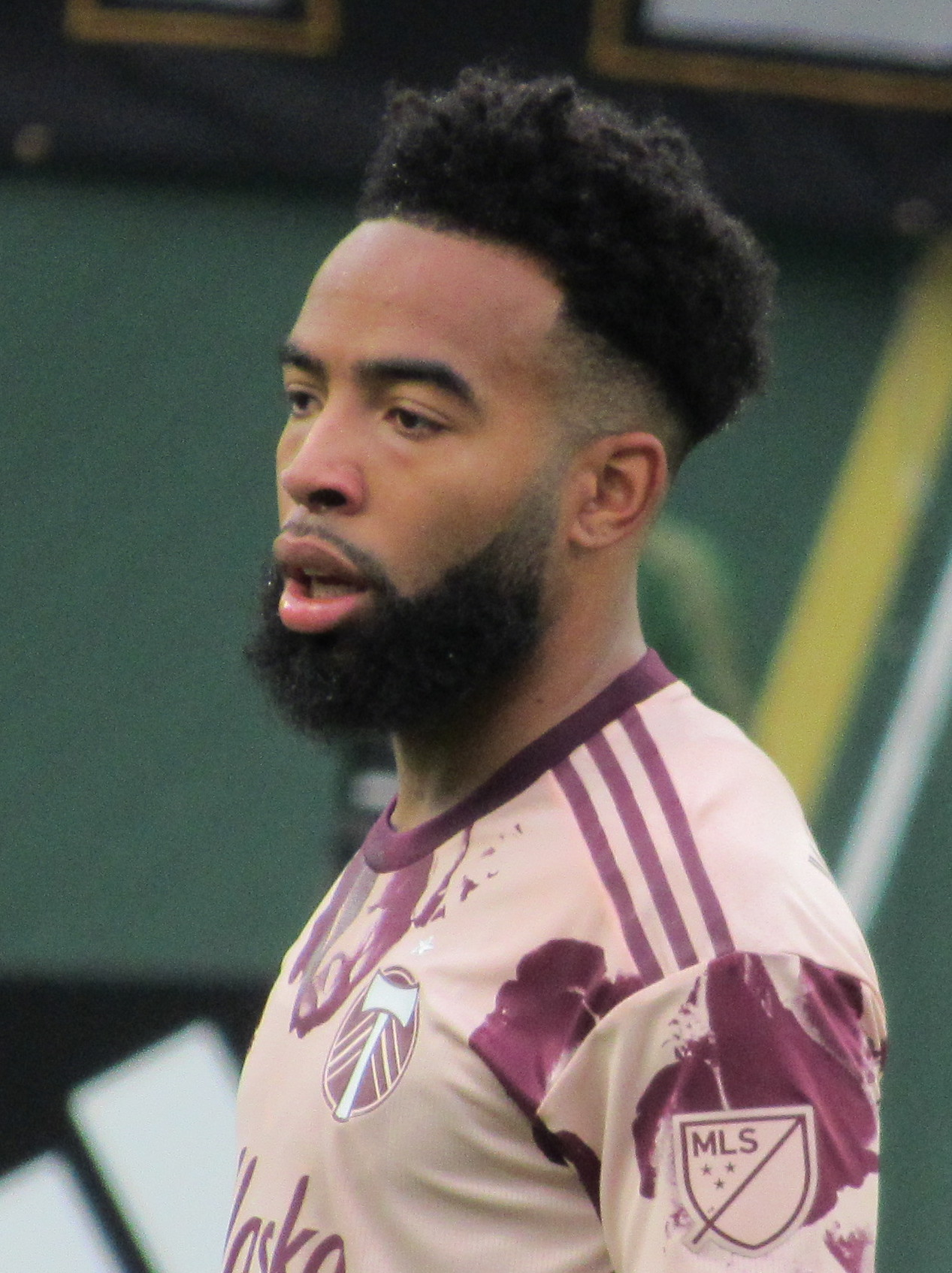
Williamson has earned six caps with the USMNT.

=== Portland Timbers ===
Player	Current club	Year signed
(United States) Brent Richards	retired	2012
(United States) Steven Evans	retired	2013
(United States) Bryan Gallego	retired	2014
(United States) **Marco Farfan**	(Mexico) Tigres UANL	2017
(United States) Foster Langsdorf	retired	2018
(United States) **Eryk Williamson**		2018
(United States) Blake Bodily	(United States) Athletic Club Boise	2020
(United States) Hunter Sulte	(United States) Portland Timbers	2021
(United States) Tega Ikoba	(United States) Sporting Kansas City II	2022
(United States) Sawyer Jura	(United States) Portland Timbers	2026
(United States) Eric Izoita	(United States) Portland Timbers	2026

=== Real Salt Lake ===
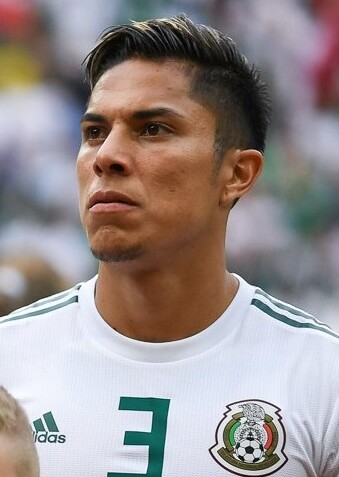
Carlos Salcedo earned 47 caps for Mexico.

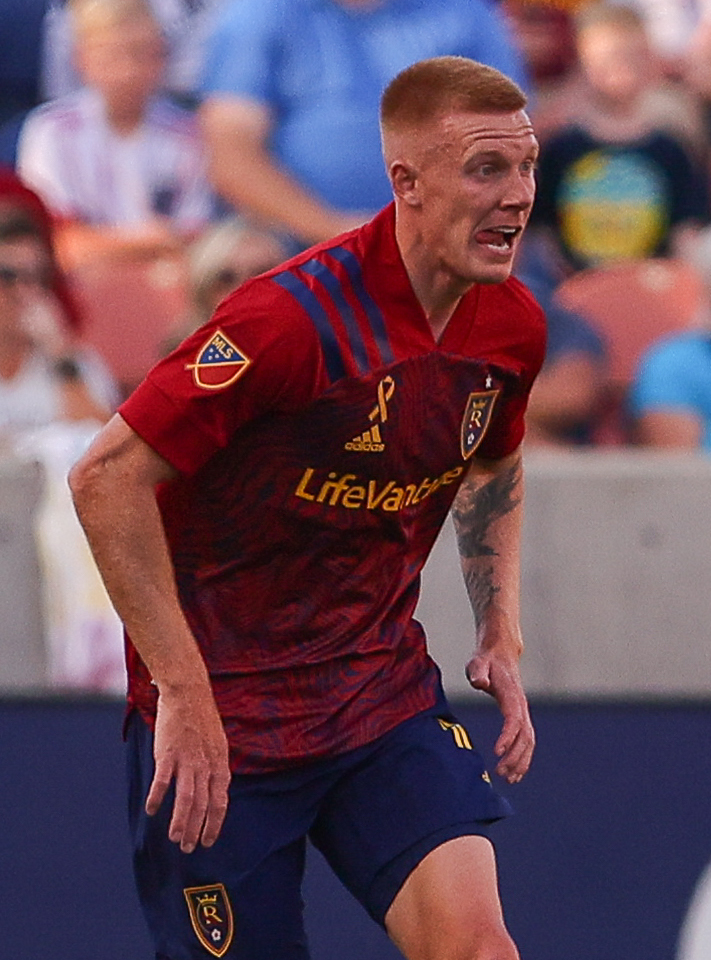
Justen Glad became the first RSL homegrown player to play in over 200 games for the team.

Player	Current club	Year signed
(El Salvador) Nico Muñiz	retired	2011
(United States) Donny Toia	retired	2011
(Mexico) Lalo Fernández	retired	2012
(United States) Benji Lopez	retired	2013
(Mexico) **Carlos Salcedo**	(Mexico) Monterrey	2013
(United States) Jordan Allen	retired	2014
(United States) Justen Glad	(United States) Real Salt Lake	2014
(United States) Sebastian Saucedo	(United States) Birmingham Legion	2014
(Rwanda) Phanuel Kavita	(United States) Birmingham Legion	2015
(Chile) Adolfo Ovalle	retired	2015
(Honduras) **Danilo Acosta**	retired	2016
(United States) Ricardo Velazco	(United States) FC Arizona	2016
(Mexico) José Hernández		2017
(United States) **Corey Baird**		2018
(Guatemala) **Aaron Herrera**		2018
(United States) **Brooks Lennon**	(United States) Columbus Crew	2018
(United States) Luis Arriaga	retired	2019
(United States) Erik Holt	retired	2019
(Mexico) David Ochoa		2019
(United States) Tate Schmitt		2019
(Mexico) Julián Vázquez	retired	2019
(United States) Christopher Garcia	(United States) FC Naples	2020
(United States) Milan Iloski	(United States) Philadelphia Union	2020
(United States) Andrew Brody		2021
(United States) Bode Hidalgo	(Canada) CF Montréal	2021
(United States) Jeff Dewsnup	retired	2021
(United States) Zackery Farnsworth	(United States) Monterey Bay FC	2021
(United States) Gavin Beavers	(Denmark) Brøndby	2022
(United States) Julio Benitez	(United States) San Jose Frogs	2022
(Ivory Coast) Axel Kei		2022
(Mexico) Jaziel Orozco	(United States) St. Louis City	2022
(United States) Jude Wellings		2022
(United States) Luis Rivera	(United States) Real Salt Lake	2023
(Haiti) Delentz Pierre	(United States) FC Tulsa	2023
(United States) Tommy Silva	(United States) Detroit City	2024
(United States) Zavier Gozo	(England) Crystal Palace	2024
(United States) Owen Anderson	(United States) Real Salt Lake	2025
(United States) Aiden Hezarkhani	(United States) Real Salt Lake	2025
(United States) Omar Marquez	(United States) Real Salt Lake	2025
(United States) Juan Gio Villa	(United States) Real Salt Lake	2025
(Mexico) Diego Rocío	(Mexico) Club América (on loan from (United States) Real Salt Lake)	2026
(United States) Griffin Dillon	(United States) Real Salt Lake	2026
(Chile) Anonio Riquelme	(United States) Real Salt Lake	2026
(Canada) Van Parker	(United States) Real Salt Lake	2026

=== San Diego FC ===
Player	Current club	Year signed
(Tunisia) Anisse Saidi	(United States) San Diego FC	2025

=== San Jose Earthquakes ===
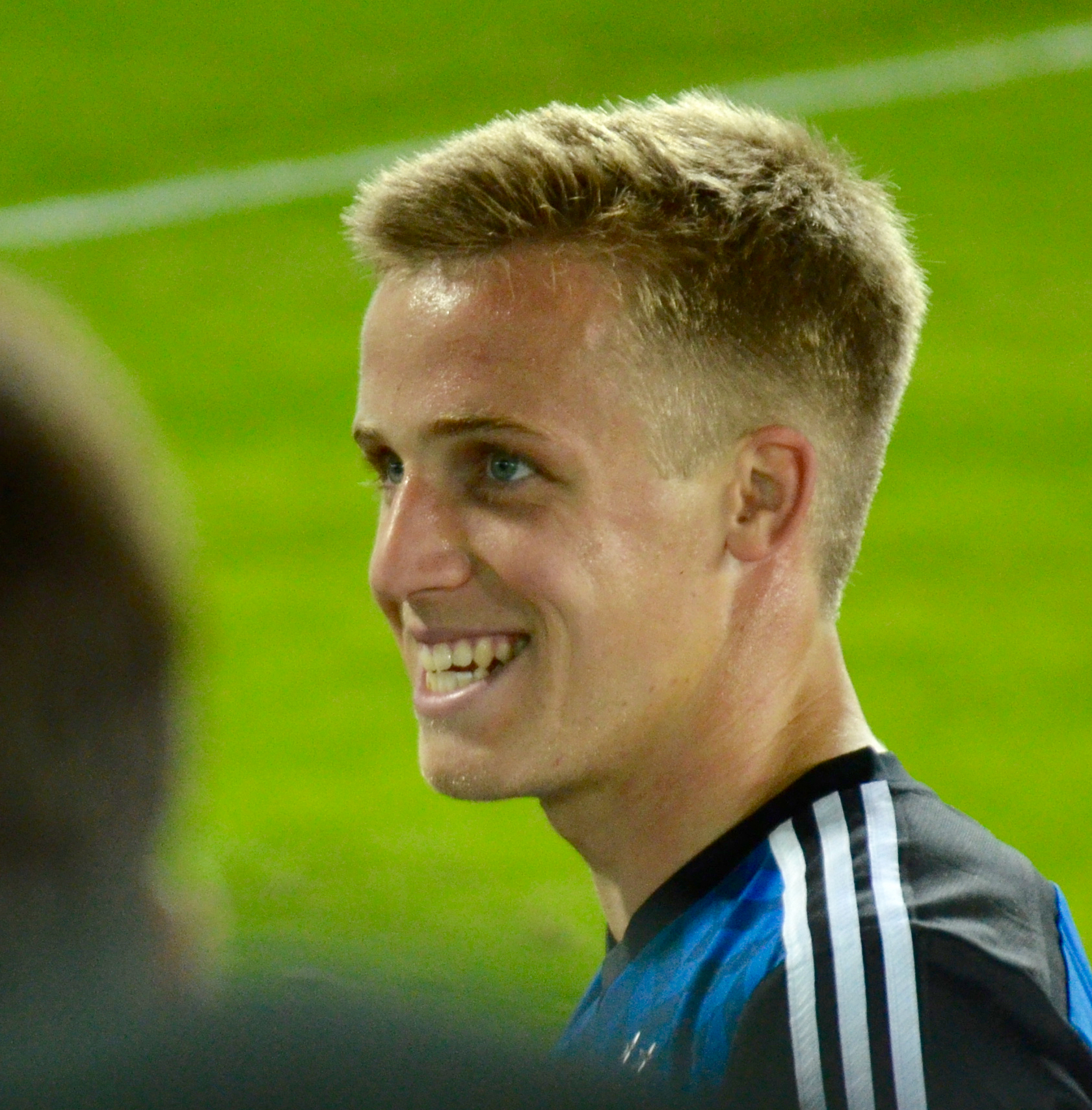
Tommy Thompson is currently 4th all-time in games played for the Earthquakes at over 200 appearances.

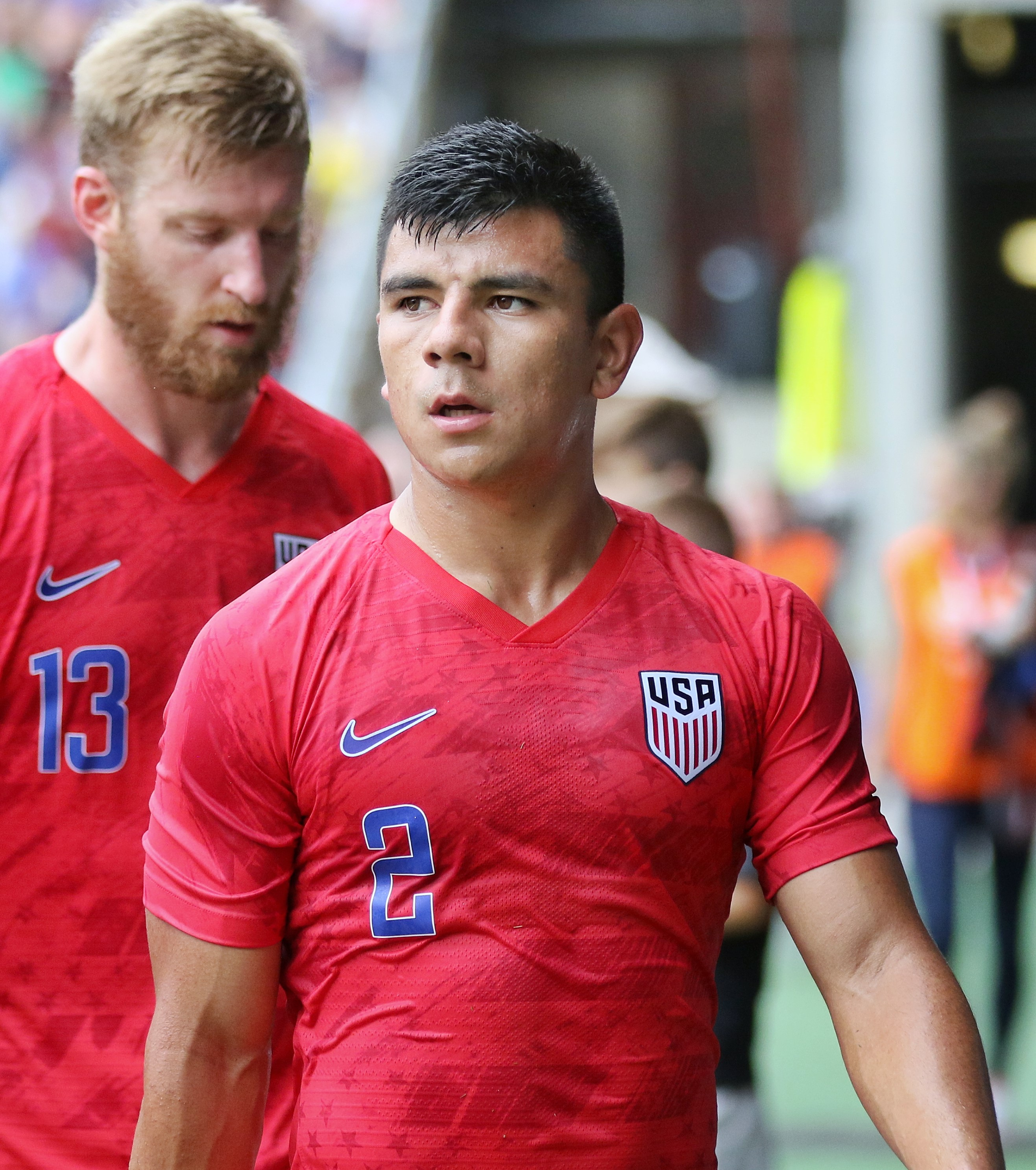
Nick Lima played 231 games in MLS and earned 9 caps with the USMNT.

Player	Current club	Year signed
(United States) Tommy Thompson		2014
(United States) **Nick Lima**	retired	2017
(United States) Jacob Akanyirige		2018
(United States) Gilbert Fuentes	retired	2018
(United States) JT Marcinkowski	(United States) LA Galaxy	2018
(United States) **Cade Cowell**	(United States) New York Red Bulls (on loan from (Mexico) Guadalajara)	2019
(United States) Casey Walls	retired	2020
(Mexico) Emi Ochoa	(Mexico) Cruz Azul	2021
(United States) Will Richmond		2022
(United States) Niko Tsakiris	(United States) San Jose Earthquakes	2022
(United States) Cruz Medina	(Mexico) Tapatío (on loan from (United States) San Jose Earthquakes)	2022
(United States) Cam Cilley	(United States) St. Louis City 2	2023
(United States) Keegan Tingey	(United States) Oakland Roots	2023
(United States) Chance Cowell	(United States) Real Salt Lake	2023
(United States) Edwyn Mendoza	(United States) San Jose Earthquakes	2023
(United States) Oscar Verhoeven	(United States) San Diego FC	2023
(United States) Wilson Eisner	(United States) San Diego FC	2025
(United States) Kaedren Spivey	(United States) San Jose Earthquakes	2025
(United States) Rohan Rajagopal	(United States) San Jose Earthquakes	2026
(United States) Tomo Allen	(United States) San Jose Earthquakes	2026
(Mexico) Marcelo Ávalos	(United States) San Jose Earthquakes	2026

=== Seattle Sounders FC ===
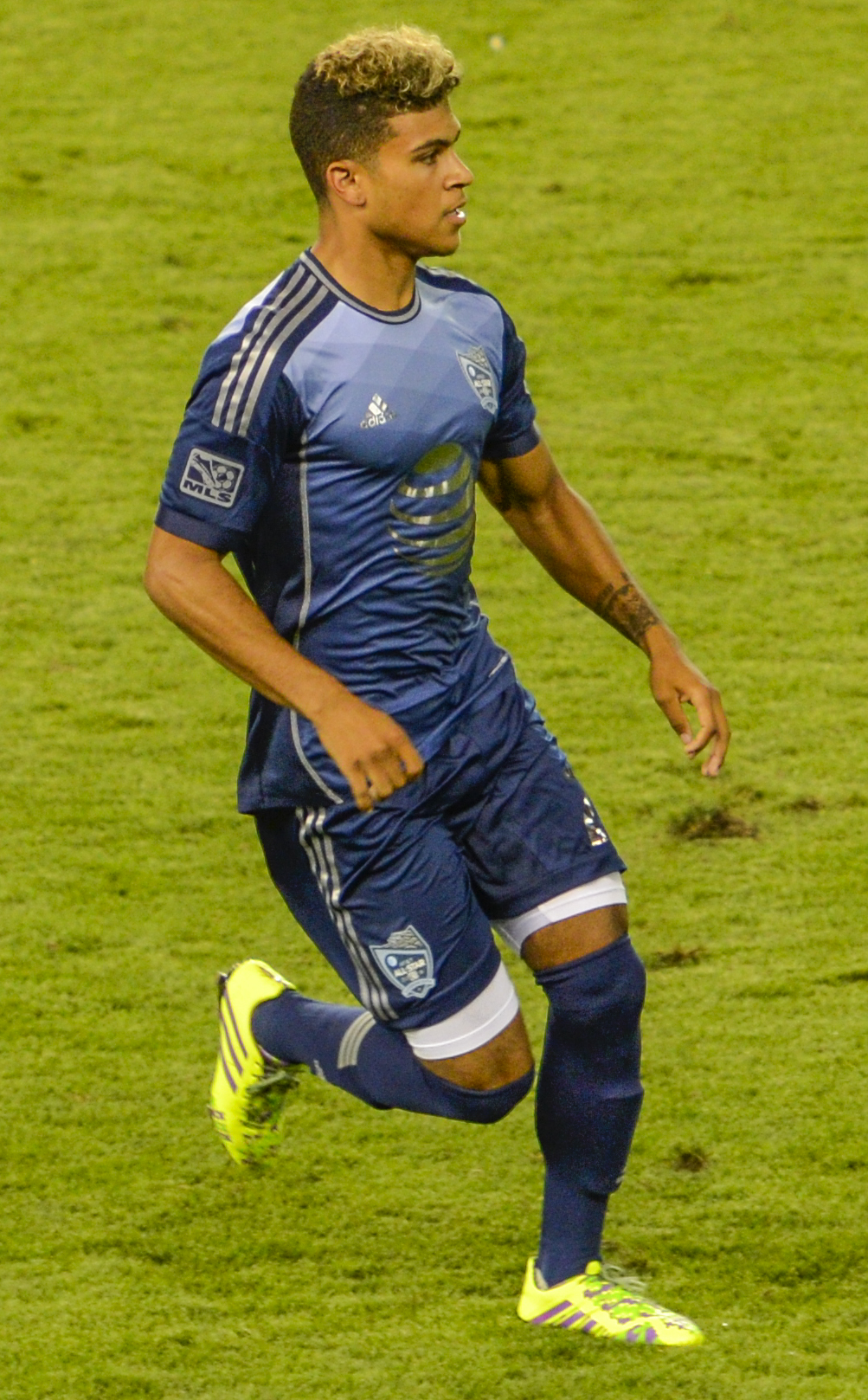
DeAndre Yedlin is a 3x MLS All-Star. He has earned 81 caps with the USMNT and was selected to the 2014 and 2022 FIFA World Cup squads.

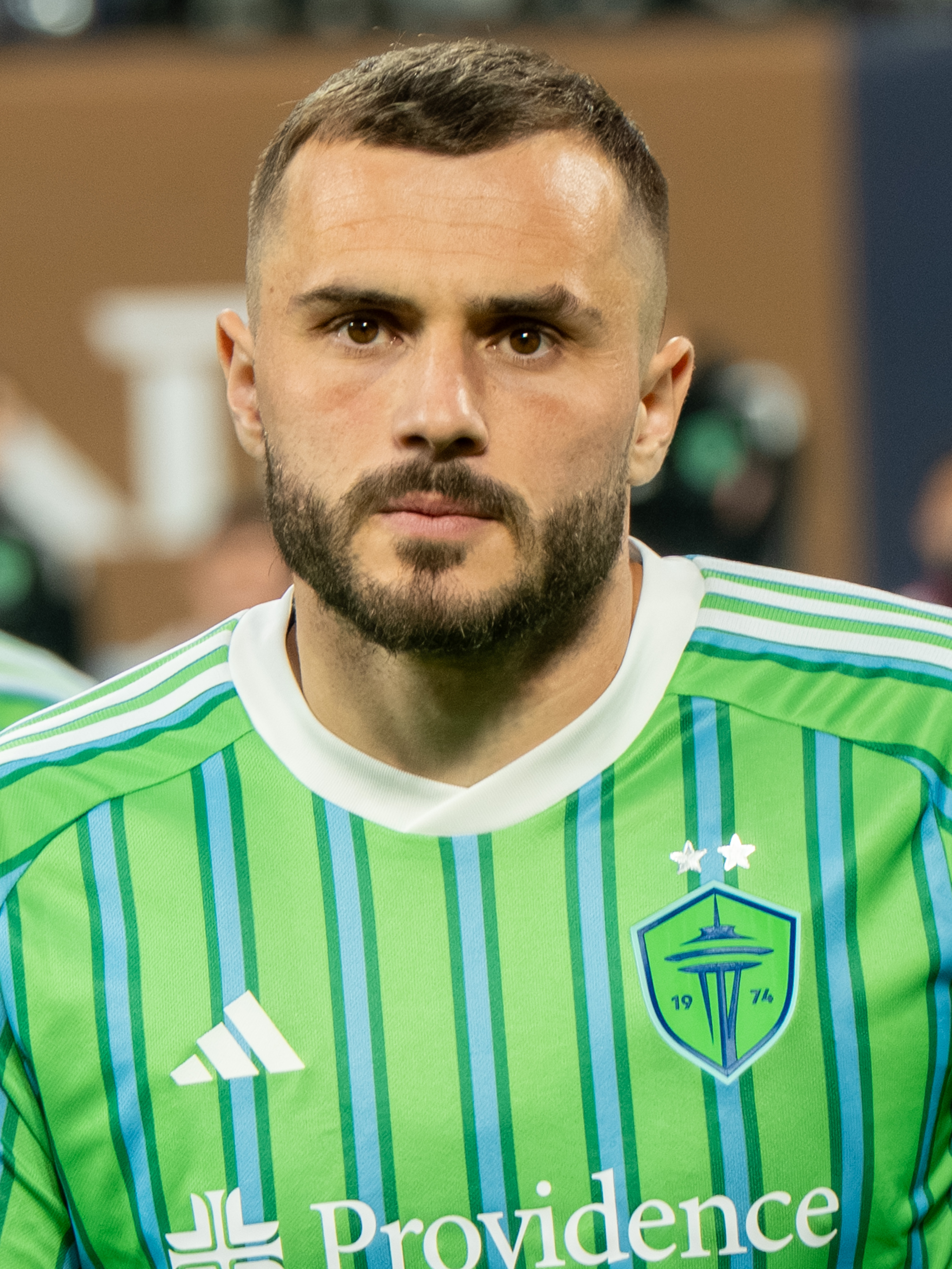
A 2x MLS All-Star, and 2020 MLS Best XI selection, Jordan Morris has earned 55 USMNT caps and was selected to the 2022 FIFA World Cup squad.

Player	Current club	Year signed
(United States) **DeAndre Yedlin**	(United States) Real Salt Lake	2012
(United States) Aaron Kovar	retired	2014
(United States) Sean Okoli	retired	2014
(United States) Darwin Jones	retired	2015
(United States) Victor Mansaray	(Indonesia) Persipura Jayapura	2015
(United States) **Jordan Morris**	(United States) Seattle Sounders	2016
(Canada) Jordan Schweitzer	retired	2016
(United States) Seyi Adekoya	retired	2017
(United States) Henry Wingo		2017
(Somalia) Handwalla Bwana	(United States) Las Vegas Lights	2018
(United States) Danny Leyva	(Mexico) Necaxa	2019
(United States) Trey Muse	(United States) Portland Timbers	2019
(United States) Alfonso Ocampo-Chavez	retired	2019
(United States) Josh Atencio	(United States) Colorado Rapids	2020
(United States) Ethan Dobbelaere	retired	2020
(United States) Shandon Hopeau	retired	2020
(United States) Reed Baker-Whiting	(United States) Nashville SC	2021
(Mexico) Obed Vargas	(Spain) Atlético Madrid	2021
(United States) Dylan Teves		2022
(United States) Sota Kitahara		2023
(United States) Jacob Castro	(United States) Rhode Island FC	2023
(United States) Cody Baker	(United States) New England Revolution (on loan from (United States) Seattle Sounders)	2023
(United States) Stuart Hawkins	(United States) Seattle Sounders	2023
(United States) Leo Burney	(Republic of Ireland) Drogheda United	2025
(United States) Snyder Brunell	(United States) Seattle Sounders	2025
(United States) Sebastian Gomez	(United States) Seattle Sounders	2026

=== St. Louis City SC ===
Player	Current club	Year signed
(United States) Caden Glover	(United States) St. Louis City	2023
(United States) Miguel Perez	(United States) St. Louis City	2023
(United States) Tyson Pearce	(United States) St. Louis City	2024
(United States) Mykhi Joyner	(United States) St. Louis City	2024

=== Toronto FC ===
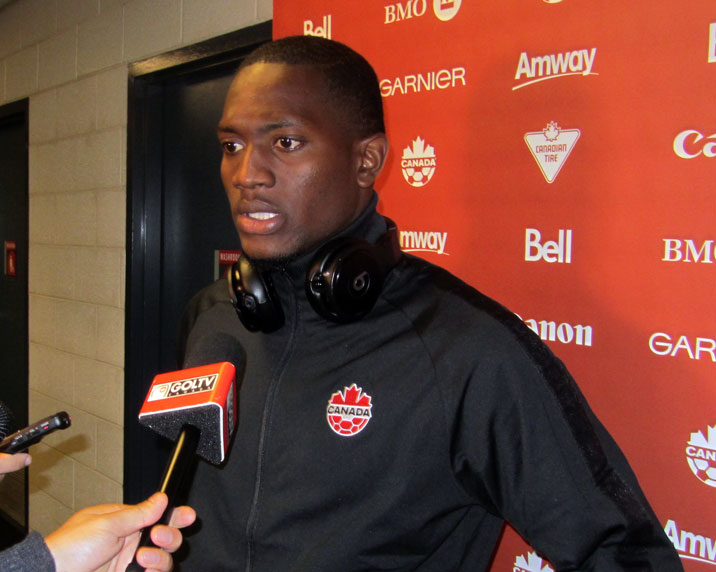
Doneil Henry earned 44 caps with the Canada men's national soccer team. He was selected to the squad for the 2022 FIFA World Cup, but sustained an injury that ruled him out of the tournament.

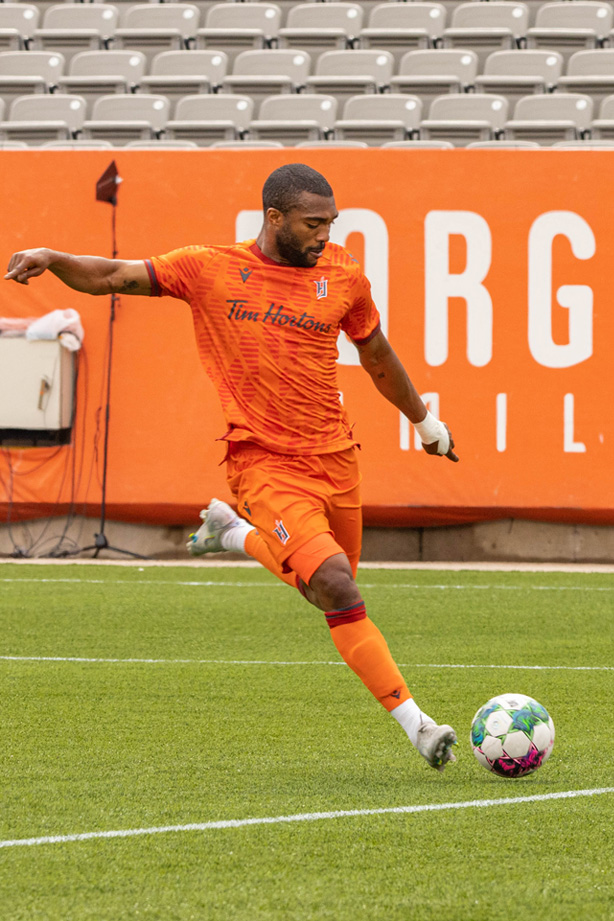
Ashtone Morgan is Toronto FC's first homegrown player to appear in over 100 games.

Player	Current club	Year signed
(Canada) Nicholas Lindsay	retired	2010
(Canada) **Doneil Henry**	retired	2010
(Canada) Keith Makubuya	retired	2011
(Canada) Oscar Cordon	retired	2011
(Canada) Matt Stinson	retired	2011
(Canada) **Ashtone Morgan**	retired	2011
(Guyana) **Quillan Roberts**	(New Zealand) Western Suburbs	2012
(Canada) Manny Aparicio	(Canada) Atlético Ottawa	2013
(Canada) **Jordan Hamilton**	(Myanmar) Shan United	2014
(Canada) Chris Mannella	retired	2014
(Canada) **Jay Chapman**		2015
(Syria) **Molham Babouli**	(Canada) Forge FC	2016
(United States) Ben Spencer	retired	2017
(Canada) Aidan Daniels	(Canada) Pacific FC	2018
(Canada) Julian Dunn	(Canada) Atlético Ottawa	2018
(Canada) Sergio Camargo	(Canada) Cavalry FC	2020
(Canada) **Ayo Akinola**	(Switzerland) Lausanne Ouchy	2018
(Canada) **Liam Fraser**	(England) Reading	2018
(Uganda) **Noble Okello**	(United States) Lexington SC	2019
(Canada) **Jacob Shaffelburg**	(United States) Los Angeles FC	2019
(Canada) **Jahkeele Marshall-Rutty**	(United States) New York Red Bulls	2020
(Canada) **Jayden Nelson**	(England) Bolton Wanderers	2020
(Canada) **Ralph Priso**	(Canada) Vancouver Whitecaps	2020
(Canada) Rocco Romeo	(United States) Brooklyn FC	2020
(Canada) Jordan Perruzza		2021
(Trinidad and Tobago) **Luke Singh**	(Canada) Inter Toronto	2021
(Canada) Luca Petrasso	(Canada) CF Montréal	2022
(Canada) Deandre Kerr	(Portugal) AVS	2022
(Canada) Kosi Thompson	(United States) Colorado Rapids	2022
(Canada) Themi Antonoglou	(United States) Las Vegas Lights	2022
(Canada) Hugo Mbongue	(United States) Charlotte FC	2022
(Canada) Kobe Franklin	(Canada) Toronto FC	2023
(Canada) Adam Pearlman	(Canada) Cavalry FC (on loan from (Canada) Toronto FC)	2024
(United States) Adisa De Rosario	(Canada) Toronto FC	2025
(Canada) Markus Cimermancic	(Canada) Toronto FC	2025
(Canada) Lazar Stefanovic	(Canada) Toronto FC	2025
(Canada) Stefan Kapor	(Canada) Toronto FC	2026
(Canada) Richard Chukwu	(Canada) Toronto FC	2026
(Canada) Antone Bossenberry	(Canada) Toronto FC	2026

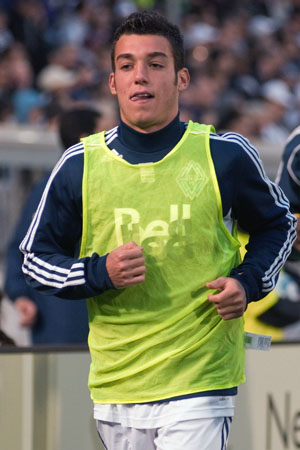
Russell Teibert earned 27 caps with Canada and spent his entire professional career with the Vancouver Whitecaps (2008–2023).

=== Vancouver Whitecaps FC ===
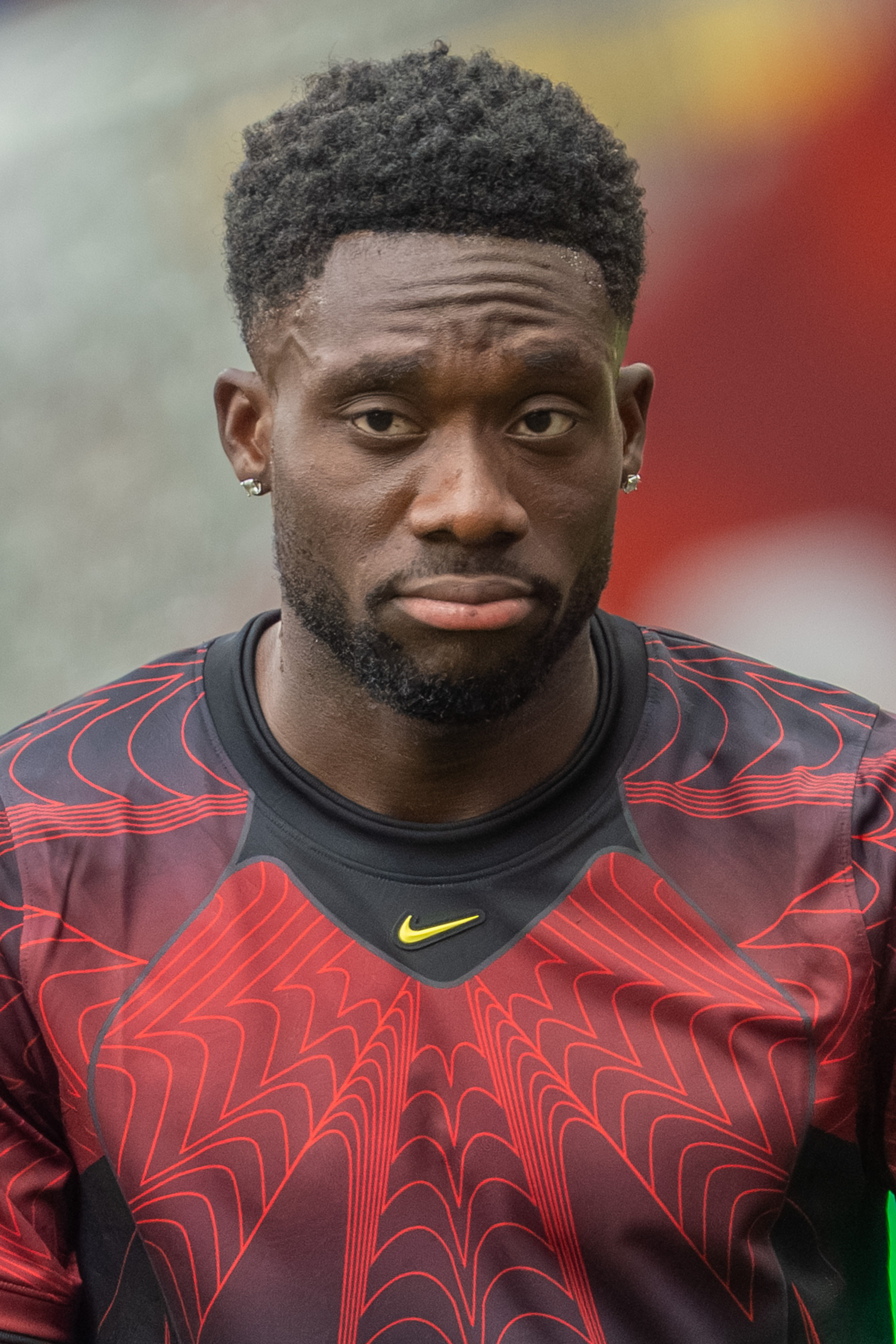
In 2020, Alphonso Davies became the first MLS homegrown player to be named to the FIFPRO World XI and first homegrown player to win the UEFA Champions League. He has earned 59 caps with Canada and was selected to the 2022 and 2026 FIFA World Cup squads.

Player	Current club	Year signed
(Canada) Philippe Davies	retired	2011
(Tanzania) **Nizar Khalfan**	retired	2011
(Haiti) **Brian Sylvestre**	retired	2011
(Canada) **Russell Teibert**	retired	2011
(Canada) Bryce Alderson	retired	2012
(Canada) **Caleb Clarke**	(Canada) Altitude FC	2012
(Canada) **Sam Adekugbe**	(Canada) Vancouver Whitecaps	2013
(Canada) Marco Carducci	(Canada) HFX Wanderers	2014
(Canada) **Kianz Froese**	(Indonesia) Semen Padang	2014
(South Africa) Ethen Sampson	retired	2014
(Canada) **Marco Bustos**	(Canada) Pacific FC	2015
(Canada) **Alphonso Davies**	(Germany) Bayern Munich	2016
(Philippines) Michael Baldisimo	(Canada) Cavalry FC	2018
(Canada) Simon Colyn	(Denmark) Lyngby	2018
(Canada) **Ben McKendry**	retired	2018
(Canada) **Sean Melvin**	(Canada) Pacific FC	2018
(Canada) David Norman Jr.	(Canada) Vancouver FC	2018
(Canada) **Theo Bair**	(France) Auxerre	2019
(Canada) Thomas Hasal	(United States) Los Angeles FC	2019
(Canada) Georges Mukumbilwa	(Canada) Pacific FC	2019
(Canada) Patrick Metcalfe	(Norway) HamKam	2020
(Canada) Isaac Boehmer	(Canada) Vancouver Whitecaps	2020
(Canada) Gianfranco Facchineri	(Republic of Ireland) Galway United	2020
(Canada) Damiano Pecile	(Canada) Vancouver FC	2020
(Canada) Matteo Campagna	(Canada) Vancouver FC	2021
(Canada) Kamron Habibullah	(Canada) Atlético Ottawa	2021
(Canada) **Ali Ahmed**	(England) Norwich City	2022
(Canada) Max Anchor	(United States) Seattle Sounders	2023
(Canada) Jeevan Badwal	(Canada) Vancouver Whitecaps	2024
(Canada) Liam Mackenzie	(Canada) Vancouver Whitecaps	2025
(Tunisia) Rayan Elloumi	(Canada) Vancouver Whitecaps	2025
(Moldova) **Mihail Gherasimencov**	(Canada) Vancouver Whitecaps	2026
(Canada) Johnny Selemani	(Canada) Vancouver Whitecaps	2026

Notes

1. Homegrown rights acquired from another team.
2. Homegrown rights acquired from Atlanta United FC
3. Homegrown rights acquired from the Chicago Fire FC
4. Homegrown rights acquired from Dallas
5. Homegrown rights acquired from D.C. United
6. Homegrown rights acquired from the LA Galaxy
7. Homegrown rights acquired from Minnesota United FC
8. Homegrown rights acquired from New York City FC
9. Homegrown rights acquired from the Philadelphia Union
10. Homegrown rights acquired from the New England Revolution
11. Homegrown rights acquired from the New York Red Bulls
12. Homegrown rights acquired from Real Salt Lake
13. Homegrown rights acquired from the Seattle Sounders FC
14. Homegrown rights acquired from the San Jose Earthquakes
15. Homegrown rights acquired from Toronto FC

== Records ==
The following table shows the leading home grown player goal scorer by season. It also shows which club the player was with in that season, as well as the player's age at the end of that season.

Year	Player (Club)	Goals	Age	Transfer notes
2010	(Honduras) Andy Najar (D.C. United)	5	17	Transferred to Anderlecht (Belgium) in January 2013.
2011	(United States) Juan Agudelo (New York Red Bulls)	6	18	
2012	(United States) Juan Agudelo (New York Red Bulls)	3	19	Transferred to Stoke City (England) in January 2014.
2013	(Uruguay) Diego Fagúndez (New England Revolution)	13	18	
2014	(United States) Gyasi Zardes (LA Galaxy)	14	23	
2015	(Uruguay) Diego Fagúndez (New England Revolution)	6	20	
2016	(United States) Jordan Morris (Seattle Sounders)	12	21	
2017	(Canada) Anthony Jackson-Hamel (Montreal Impact)	9	24	
2018	(United States) Gyasi Zardes (Columbus Crew)	19	27	Traded to Columbus Crew in January 2018
2019	(United States) Gyasi Zardes (Columbus Crew)	13	28	
2020	(United States) Gyasi Zardes (Columbus Crew)	12	29	
2021	(Hungary) Dániel Sallói (Sporting Kansas City)	16	25	
2022	(United States) Jesús Ferreira (FC Dallas)	18	21	
2023	(United States) Jesús Ferreira (FC Dallas)	12	22	
2024	(United States) Jordan Morris (Seattle Sounders)	13	30	
2025	(United States) Milan Iloski (San Diego FC & Philadelphia Union)	12	26	
