= 2021 New England Revolution II season =

New England Revolution II
2021 season
- Owner: The Kraft Group
- Head coach: Clint Peay
- Stadium: Gillette Stadium
- USL League One: 8th
- USL1 Playoffs: DNQ
- Top goalscorer: League: All: Damian Rivera 6
- Biggest win: NE 3–0 NTX (Jun. 26); NE 3–0 NC (Aug. 5)
- Biggest defeat: RIC 3–0 NE (Apr. 17); GVL 3–0 NE (Jul. 4); NC 4–1 NE (Sept. 11); NTX 4–1 NE (Oct. 23)
Home colors	Away colors

The 2021 New England Revolution II season was the second season in the soccer team's history, where they compete in the third division of American soccer, USL League One. New England Revolution II, as a child club of New England Revolution of Major League Soccer, are barred from participating in the 2021 U.S. Open Cup. New England Revolution II play their home games at Gillette Stadium, located in Foxborough, Massachusetts, United States.

== Club ==
=== Roster ===
As of July 22, 2021.

No.	Pos.	Nat.	Name
47	MF	(United States)	Esmir Bajraktarevic#
61	MF	(United States)	Joseph Buck#
49	MF	(United States)	Noel Buck
44	DF	(France)	Pierre Cayet
27	MF	(United States)	Luis Caicedo+
55	DF	(United States)	Cole Dewhurst#
60	DF	(Haiti)	Francois Dulysse
90	GK	(United States)	Earl Edwards Jr+
77	DF	(Nigeria)	Prosper Figbe
54	DF	(United States)	Tyler Freitas
53	MF	(Japan)	Hikaru Fujiwara
19	FW	(United States)	Edward Kizza+
18	GK	(United States)	Brad Knighton+
38	DF	(Colombia)	Christian Mafla+
45	DF	(United States)	Morris Matthews#
33	MF	(Portugal)	Tiago Mendonca
13	MF	(Brazil)	Lucas Maciel Felix+
48	MF	(Brazil)	Michel
70	GK	(Germany)	Yannik Oettl
40	DF	(United States)	Sean O'Hearn
7	FW	(United States)	Connor Presley
50	GK	(United States)	Marzuq Puckerin
41	DF	(United States)	Colby Quiñones
37	MF	(United States)	Dennis Ramirez
12	FW	(United States)	Justin Rennicks+
51	GK	(United States)	Joe Rice
72	MF	(United States)	Damian Rivera+
32	MF	(United States)	Jake Rozhansky
99	FW	(United States)	Ryan Sierakowski§
36	FW	(Cape Verde)	Meny Silva
34	MF	(United States)	Ryan Spaulding
52	FW	(United States)	Michael Tsicoulias#
35	DF	(United States)	Collin Verfurth+

'#' Non-rostered academy player
+ On loan from first team
§ on loan to Forward Madison as of Aug 20, 2021

=== Coaching staff ===
Name	Position
(United States) Clint Peay	Head coach
(United States) Marcelo Santos	Assistant coach
(Japan) Yuta Nomura	Assistant coach (Goalkeepers)

== Competitions ==
=== Exhibitions ===
May 4, 2021 Exhibition 1	Hartford Athletic	2–2	New England Revolution II	Farmington, Connecticut
7:00 PM EST		Report		Stadium: Farmington Sports Arena

=== USL League One ===
==== Standings ====
Pos	Team	Pld	W	D	L	GF	GA	GD	Pts	Qualification
6	North Texas SC	28	10	10	8	40	32	+8	40	Qualification for the play-offs
7	Toronto FC II	28	10	8	10	34	32	+2	38	
8	New England Revolution II	28	11	4	13	33	39	−6	37	
9	Forward Madison FC	28	8	12	8	32	34	−2	36	
10	Fort Lauderdale CF	28	8	7	13	40	49	−9	31	

Source: USL League One
Rules for classification: 1) points; 2) total wins; 3) total goal differential; 4) total goals scored; 5) points earned against top four Conference finishers; 6) disciplinary points; 7) drawing of lots.

==== Results summary ====
Overall								Home						Away					
Pld	W	D	L	GF	GA	GD	Pts	W	D	L	GF	GA	GD	W	D	L	GF	GA	GD
28	11	4	13	33	39	−6	37	8	2	4	18	13	+5	3	2	9	15	26	−11

Source: USL League One

==== Results by round ====
Round	1	2	3	4	5	6	7	8	9	10	11	12	13	14	15	16	17	18	19	20	21	22	23	24	25	26	27	28
Stadium	A	H	H	H	H	A	A	A	H	A	H	H	A	H	H	A	A	H	H	A	H	A	H	A	H	A	A	A
Result	W	L	L	D	W	L	L	W	W	L	L	W	L	W	W	D	D	L	D	L	W	W	W	L	W	L	L	L
Position								9	6	8	9	5	8	7	6	4	3	x	x	9	6	5	4	4	4	5	6	8

Source: USL League One
A = Away; H = Home; W = Win; D = Draw; L = Loss

==== Match results ====
April 10, 2021 1	Fort Lauderdale CF	0–1	New England Revolution II	Fort Lauderdale, Florida
7:30 PM EDT	Sierakowski 50'; Rozhansky (yellow card) 54'	Report		Stadium: DRV PNK Stadium; Referee: Elvis Osmanovic

April 17, 2021 2	New England Revolution II	0–3	Richmond Kickers	Foxborough, Massachusetts
5:00 PM EDT	Mafla (yellow card) 70'; Caicedo (yellow card) 76'; Dulysse (yellow card) 88'	Report	Bolanos 35', (yellow card) 36'; Monticelli 45+2'; Morán (yellow card) 79'; Anderson 90+3'	Stadium: Gillette Stadium; Referee: Thomas Snyder

May 12, 2021 3	New England Revolution II	0–1	Union Omaha	Foxborough, Massachusetts
5:00 PM EDT	J. Buck (yellow card) 26'; Presley (yellow card) 27'; Dulysse (yellow card) 38'	Report	Scearce (yellow card) 52'; Hurst 84', (yellow card) 90+1'	Stadium: Gillette Stadium; Referee: Adam Kilpatrick

May 16, 2021 4	New England Revolution II	2–2	Chattanooga Red Wolves SC	Foxborough, Massachusetts
8:30 PM EDT	Ramos 37' (o.g.); O'Hearn (yellow card) 42'; Sierakowski (yellow card) 45'; N. Buck 54'	Report	Pineda (yellow card) 48'; España 60', 67'; Ualefi (yellow card) 83'	Stadium: Gillette Stadium; Referee: Jeremy Scheer

May 28, 2021 5	New England Revolution II	1–0	Fort Lauderdale CF	Foxborough, Massachusetts
7:00 PM EDT	Cayet 57'	Report	Hundal (penalty missed) 20'; Evans (yellow card) 24'; Poplawski (yellow card) 45'; Neville (yellow card) 52'	Stadium: Gillette Stadium; Referee: Christian Centeno

June 5, 2021 6	Richmond Kickers	3–2	New England Revolution II	Richmond, Virginia
6:30 PM EDT	Bolduc 1'; Crisler (yellow card) 36'; Monticelli 40'; Terzaghi 51'; Vinyals (yellow card) 83'	Report	N. Buck 30'; Cayet 76'; Michel (yellow card) 90+1'	Stadium: City Stadium; Referee: JC Griggs

June 12, 2021 7	Union Omaha	4–2	New England Revolution II	Papillion, Nebraska
8:00 PM EDT	Sousa (yellow card) 5'; Hurst 21', 45+1', 47'; Boyce 77'	Report	Knighton (yellow card) 10'; Presley 23'; Tsicoulias 63'	Stadium: Werner Park; Referee: Velimir Stefanovic

June 19, 2021 8	Forward Madison FC	0–2	New England Revolution II	Madison, Wisconsin
8:00 PM EDT	Gómez (yellow card) 36'; Díaz (yellow card) 49'; Molloy (yellow card) 54'	Report	Rozhansky (yellow card) 35'; Michel (yellow card) 42'; N. Buck 45+1'; Joe Rice (yellow card) 45+1'; Presley (yellow card) 49'; Spaulding (yellow card) 53'; Tsicoulias 81'; Ramirez (yellow card) 90+3'	Stadium: Breese Stevens Field; Attendance: 3,208; Referee: Chris Ruska

June 26, 2021 9	New England Revolution II	3–0	North Texas SC	Foxborough, Massachusetts
7:00 PM EDT	Michel (yellow card) 4'; Rennicks 58'; Spaulding 61'; Rivera 65' (pen.); O'Hearn (yellow card) 73'; Edwards Jr (yellow card) 90+2'	Report	Rayo (yellow card) 24'	Stadium: Gillette Stadium; Referee: Jeremy Scheer

June 30, 2021 10	Forward Madison FC	1–0	New England Revolution II	Madison, Wisconsin
8:00 PM EDT	Keegan 20'; Díaz (yellow card) 60'; Breno (yellow card) 90+2'	Report	Michel (yellow card) 42'; Rozhansky (yellow card) 48'	Stadium: Breese Stevens Field; Attendance: 3,607; Referee: Katherine McCormick

July 4, 2021 11	New England Revolution II	0–3	Greenville Triumph SC	Foxborough, Massachusetts
7:00 PM EDT		Report	Marios Lomis 29', 35', 83'	Stadium: Gillette Stadium; Attendance: 125; Referee: Kenneth Rojas

July 9, 2021 12	New England Revolution II	1–0	Toronto FC II	Foxborough, Massachusetts
7:00 PM EDT	Rivera 29'; Rice (yellow card) 83'; Rozhansky (yellow card) 83'	Report	Essoussi (penalty missed) 84'; McLaughlin (yellow card) 87'	Stadium: Gillette Stadium; Attendance: 100; Referee: Christian Centeno

July 17, 2021 13	FC Tucson	4–2	New England Revolution II	Tucson, Arizona
10:00 PM EDT	Bedoya 23', (yellow card) 53'; Adams 26'; Uzo 47', 75'; Schenfeld (red card) 90+2'	Report	Verfurth (yellow card) 6'; Rivera 34'; Kizza (yellow card) 45+2'; Michel (yellow card) 55'; Rozhansky (yellow card) 76'; Sierakowski 81'	Stadium: Kino North Stadium; Referee: Adorae Monroy

July 23, 2021 14	New England Revolution II	1–0	Toronto FC II	Foxborough, Massachusetts
7:00 PM EDT	Spaulding 68'; O'Hearn (yellow card) 80'; Rivera (yellow card) 82'	Report	Antonoglou (yellow card) 38'; Campbell (yellow card) 45+1'; Politz (yellow card) 90+2'	Stadium: Gillette Stadium; Attendance: 120; Referee: Ernie Constantine

August 5, 2021 15	New England Revolution II	3–0	North Carolina FC	Foxborough, Massachusetts
7:00 PM EDT	Rivera 33'; Kizza 49', 74'	Report	Flores (yellow card) 53'; Flick (yellow card) 86'	Stadium: Gillette Stadium; Attendance: 100; Referee: Nabil Bensalah

August 14, 2021 16	Richmond Kickers	2–2	New England Revolution II	Richmond, Virginia
6:30 PM EDT	Terzaghi 26', (yellow card) 35', (goal) 53'; Morán (yellow card) 38'; Fitzgerald (yellow card) 79'; González (yellow card) 84'	Report	Presley (yellow card) 42'; Michel (yellow card) 55'; Verfurth (yellow card) 59'; N. Buck 86'; Kizza 87'	Stadium: City Stadium; Attendance: 1,445; Referee: John Matto

August 21, 2021 17	South Georgia Tormenta FC	1–1	New England Revolution II	Statesboro, Georgia
7:00 PM EDT	Mayr-Fälten 72'; O'Callaghan (yellow card) 74'; Thorn (yellow card) 76'; Candela (yellow card) 90+1'	Report	Kizza 60'	Stadium: Eagle Field at Erk Russell Athletic Park; Attendance: 1,324; Referee: Gabriele Giusti

September 1, 2021 18	New England Revolution II	1–2	FC Tucson	Foxborough, Massachusetts
7:00 PM EDT	Rivera 10'; Fujiwara (yellow card) 38'; Michel (yellow card) 90+1'	Report	Adams 43'; Bedoya 49'; Kone (yellow card) 54'; Corfe (yellow card) 84'; Mastrantonio (yellow card) 90+3'	Stadium: Gillette Stadium; Referee: Anya Voigt

September 5, 2021 19	New England Revolution II	1–1	South Georgia Tormenta FC	Foxborough, Massachusetts
7:00 PM EDT	Spaulding 23'	Report	Liadi 33'	Stadium: Gillette Stadium; Attendance: 125; Referee: Benjamin Meyer

September 11, 2021 20	North Carolina FC	4–1	New England Revolution II	Cary, North Carolina
7:00 PM EDT	Albadawi 16', 54'; Coan 26', (yellow card) 30'; Kamara 64'; Flores (yellow card) 66'; Holliday (yellow card) 90+2'	Report	Bajraktarevic 12'; Verfurth (yellow card) 21'; O'Hearn (yellow card) 23'	Stadium: WakeMed Soccer Park; Attendance: 2,249; Referee: Alex Billeter

September 17, 2021 21	New England Revolution II	3–1	Richmond Kickers	Foxborough, Massachusetts
7:00 PM EDT	Rennicks 33'; Rivera 47'; Rozhansky (yellow card) 70'; Rice (yellow card) 74'; Bajraktarevic (yellow card) 75'; N. Buck 90+2'	Report	Bolanos 3'; Terzaghi (yellow card) 36'; Anderson (yellow card) 76'; González (yellow card) 90'	Stadium: Gillette Stadium; Attendance: 125; Referee: Kenneth Rojas

September 25, 2021 22	Chattanooga Red Wolves SC	0–1	New England Revolution II	East Ridge, Tennessee
7:00 PM EDT	Capozucchi (yellow card) 77' (yellow-red card) 78'	Report	Rivera (yellow card) 22'; Dulysse (yellow card) 88'; Rennicks 90+6'	Stadium: CHI Memorial Stadium; Referee: Jalen Gray

October 1, 2021 23	New England Revolution II	1–0	Forward Madison FC	Foxborough, Massachusetts
5:00 PM EDT	Quinones (yellow card) 27'; Kizza 58'	Report	Allen (yellow card) 61'; Molloy (yellow card) 64'	Stadium: Gillette Stadium; Attendance: 120; Referee: Thomas Snyder

October 8, 2021 24	Toronto FC II	1–0	New England Revolution II	Toronto, Ontario
4:00 PM EDT	Maples (yellow card) 4'; Politz 24'	Report	Freitas (yellow card) 39'; N Buck (yellow card) 59'; Rice (yellow card) 86'; Quinones (yellow card) 89'	Stadium: BMO Training Ground; Referee: Michael Venne

October 12, 2021 25	New England Revolution II	1–0	Forward Madison FC	Foxborough, Massachusetts
7:00 PM EDT	Rennicks 9'; Rice (yellow card) 31'; Rozhansky (yellow card) 42'; Cayet (yellow card) 46'; O'Hearn (yellow card) 58'	Report	Gebhard (yellow card) 14'; Sukow (yellow card) 39'; Allen (yellow card) 77'	Stadium: Gillette Stadium; Attendance: 150; Referee: Luis Arroyo

October 16, 2021 26	Greenville Triumph SC	1–0	New England Revolution II	Greenville, South Carolina
7:00 PM EDT	Gavilanes 57'; Hemmings (yellow card) 82'	Report	Kizza (yellow card) 54'; Verfurth (yellow card) 64' (yellow-red card) 84'; Maciel (yellow card) 88'	Stadium: Legacy Early College Field; Attendance: 3,056; Referee: John Griggs

October 23, 2021 27	North Texas SC	4-1	New England Revolution II	Arlington, Texas
8:30 PMEDT	Munjoma 10'; Salas (red card) 27'; Kamungo 57', 89'; Rayo 83'	Report	Rennicks 4'; Dulysse (yellow card) 31'; Rozhansky (yellow card) 80'	Stadium: Globe Life Park; Attendance: 880; Referee: Corbyn May

October 29, 2021 28	Toronto FC II	1-0	New England Revolution II	Toronto, Ontario
4:00 PM EDT	Rothrock 62'	Report	Maciel (yellow card) 36'; N. Buck (yellow card) 66'; Rozhansky (yellow card) 90+3'; Joe Rice (red card) 90+4'	Stadium: BMO Training Ground; Referee: Michael Mund
