= 2022 New England Revolution II season =

New England Revolution II
2022 season
- Owner: The Kraft Group
- Head coach: Clint Peay
- Stadium: Gillette Stadium
- MLS Next Pro: Eastern Conference: 7th
- MLS Next Pro Playoffs: DNQ
- Top goalscorer: Marcos Dias, 6
- Biggest win: NE 3-1 RNY (4/3); NE 2-0 ORL (9/2)
- Biggest defeat: NE 0-4 CLB (5/8); NE 0-4 NYC (7/10); PHI 5-1 NE (8/21)
Home colors	Away colors

The 2022 New England Revolution II season was the third season in the soccer team's history, where they compete in the third division of American soccer, MLS Next Pro. New England Revolution II, as a child club of New England Revolution of Major League Soccer, are barred from participating in the 2022 U.S. Open Cup. New England Revolution II play their home games at Gillette Stadium, located in Foxborough, Massachusetts, United States.

== Club ==
=== Roster ===
As of March 28, 2022.
Revs II sign Four Players

No.	Pos.	Nat.	Name
10	MF	(United States)	Esmir Bajraktarevic
23	DF	(United States)	Jonathan Bell+
27	MF	(Colombia)	Dylan Borrero+
49	MF	(United States)	Noel Buck+
44	DF	(France)	Pierre Cayet
37	DF	(United States)	Michael DeShields
39	FW	(Brazil)	Marcos Dias
90	GK	(United States)	Earl Edwards Jr+
53	MF	(Japan)	Hikaru Fujiwara
52	DF	(Brazil)	Jose Italo dos Santos
98	GK	(United States)	Jacob Jackson+
18	GK	(United States)	Brad Knighton+
13	MF	(Brazil)	Lucas Maciel Felix+
48	MF	(Brazil)	Michel
99	FW	(Brazil)	Ryan Lima
70	GK	(Germany)	Yannik Oettl
40	DF	(United States)	Sean O'Hearn
99	GK	(Serbia)	Djordje Petrovic+
7	FW	(United States)	Connor Presley
50	GK	(United States)	Marzuq Puckerin
41	DF	(United States)	Colby Quiñones
12	FW	(United States)	Justin Rennicks+
77	DF	(United States)	Ben Reveno+
72	MF	(United States)	Damian Rivera+
32	MF	(United States)	Jake Rozhansky
36	FW	(Cape Verde)	Meny Silva
34	MF	(United States)	Ryan Spaulding+
xx	FW	(Brazil)	Weverton
66	MF	(New Zealand)	Trevor Zwetsloot

+ On loan from first team

=== Academy Roster ===
No.	Pos.	Nat.	Name
97	FW	(United States)	Triton Beauvois
42	MF	(United States)	Brandonn Bueno
61	MF	(United States)	Joseph Buck#
61	GK	(United States)	Ryan Carney
49	FW	(United States)	Greg Cook
90	DF	(United States)	Gabriell de Godoi
55	DF	(United States)	Cole Dewhurst#
89	FW	(United States)	Malcolm Fry
59	FW	(United States)	Isaie Louis
45	DF	(United States)	Morris Matthews#
54	MF	(United States)	Jack Panayotou
45	MF	(United States)	Marcos Quintana
71	DF	(United States)	Matiwos Rumley
62	GK	(United States)	Matthew Tibbetts
52	FW	(United States)	Michael Tsicoulias#
58	DF	(United States)	Dylan Walsh
60	GK	(United States)	Maxwell Weinstein

=== Coaching staff ===
Name	Position
(United States) Clint Peay	Head coach
(United States) Marcelo Santos	Assistant coach
(Japan) Yuta Nomura	Assistant coach (Goalkeepers)

== Competitions ==
=== Exhibitions ===
February 26 Exhibition 1	New England Revolution II	1–1	Hartford Athletic	Foxborough
	Noel Buck 50'	Report	36' Andre Lewis	Stadium: Gillette Stadium

=== MLS NEXT Pro ===
==== Standings ====
Eastern Conference

Pos	Div	Team	Pld	W	SOW	SOL	L	GF	GA	GD	Pts
5	NE	New York City FC II	24	9	4	2	9	49	35	+14	37
6	CT	Inter Miami CF II	24	10	1	4	9	40	49	−9	36
7	NE	New England Revolution II	24	9	1	4	10	27	42	−15	33
8	CT	Chicago Fire FC II	24	8	2	3	11	41	44	−3	31
9	CT	Orlando City B	24	6	2	3	13	40	53	−13	25

Source: MLSNP Eastern Conference
Rules for classification: 1) points; 2) total wins; 3) total goal differential; 4) total goals scored; 5) fewer disciplinary points; 6) away goal differential; 7) away goals scored; 8) home goals differential; 9) home goals scored; 10) coin toss (2 clubs tied) or drawing of lots (≥3 clubs tied)

Overall table

Pos	Team	Pld	W	SOW	SOL	L	GF	GA	GD	Pts
11	Inter Miami CF II	24	10	1	4	9	40	49	−9	36
12	Minnesota United FC 2	24	9	4	1	10	43	39	+4	36
13	New England Revolution II	24	9	1	4	10	27	42	−15	33
14	Whitecaps FC 2	24	7	3	5	9	40	40	0	32
15	Sporting Kansas City II	24	9	1	2	12	31	38	−7	31

Source: MLSNP
Rules for classification: 1) points; 2) total wins; 3) total goal differential; 4) total goals scored; 5) fewer disciplinary points; 6) away goal differential; 7) away goals scored; 8) home goals differential; 9) home goals scored; 10) coin toss (2 clubs tied) or drawing of lots (≥3 clubs tied)

==== Results summary ====
Overall								Home						Away					
Pld	W	D	L	GF	GA	GD	Pts	W	D	L	GF	GA	GD	W	D	L	GF	GA	GD
24	9	5	10	27	42	−15	32	7	1	4	15	18	−3	2	4	6	12	24	−12

Source: MLS NEXT Pro

==== Results by round ====
Round	1	2	3	4	5	6	7	8	9	10	11	12	13	14	15	16	17	18	19	20	21	22	23	24
Stadium	A	H	H	A	H	H	A	A	H	A	H	H	A	A	H	A	H	A	H	A	A	H	A	H
Result	SW	W	W	SL	W	L	W	W	W	L	W	SL	L	SL	L	L	L	L	W	L	L	W	SL	L
Position (East)	4	1	2	3	2	3	2	2	2	2	2	2	2	2	3	4	5	7	6	7	7	6	6	7

Source: MLS NEXT Pro
A = Away; H = Home; W = Win; L = Loss; SL = Shootout Loss; SW = Shootout Win

==== Match results ====
March 27, 2022 1	New York City FC II	2–2 (3–4 SO)	New England Revolution II	Queens, New York
5:00 PM EDT	Denis 10'; Gloster (penalty scored) 34'; Benalcazar (yellow card) 61'; Elias (yellow card) 82'	Report	Rivera 7', (penalty missed) 28', (yellow card) 60', (goal) 70'	Stadium: Belson Stadium; Referee: Christian Centeno

April 3, 2022 2	New England Revolution II	3–1	Rochester New York FC	Foxborough, Massachusetts
6:00 PM EDT	Michel 29'; O'Hearn 45+3', (yellow card) 8'; Zwetsloot (yellow card) 49'; Rivera 64'	Report	Dolabella (yellow card) 37'; Brigida 38'; Bubacar Djaló (yellow card) 55'	Stadium: Gillette Stadium; Referee: Katherine McCormick

April 17, 2022 3	New England Revolution II	3–2	FC Cincinnati 2	Foxborough, Massachusetts
6:00 PM EDT	Michel (yellow card) 28'; Dos Santos (yellow card) 36'; Panayotou 58', 90+2'; Lima 67'; Reveno (yellow card) 83'	Report	Ordonez 14'; Flanagan 22'; Thomas (yellow card) 40'	Stadium: Gillette Stadium; Referee: Ernie Constantine

April 24, 2022 4	Orlando City B	0–0 (4–3 SO)	New England Revolution II	Orlando, Florida
7:00 PM EDT	Gunera-Calix (yellow card) 59' (yellow-red card) 68'; Boccuzzo (yellow card) 86'	Report	Zwetsloot (yellow card) 33'	Stadium: Exploria Stadium; Referee: Amiel Aleman

May 1, 2022 5	New England Revolution II	1–0	Inter Miami CF II	Foxborough, Massachusetts
2:00 PM EDT	O'Hearn (yellow card) 14'; Buck (yellow card) 21'; N. Allen 36' (o.g.); Dias (penalty missed) 66'; Panayotou (yellow card) 82'	Report	Sunderland (yellow card) 19'; Taghvai-Najib (yellow card) 38'	Stadium: Gillette Stadium; Referee: Matthew Thompson

May 8, 2022 6	New England Revolution II	0–4	Columbus Crew 2	Foxborough, Massachusetts
5:00 PM EDT	Buck (yellow card) 25'; Michel (yellow card) 66'	Report	Micaletto 12'; Russell-Rowe (yellow card) 17', (goal) 38'; Fuson 36', 43', (yellow card) 45'; Mohamed (yellow card) 45'; Angking (yellow card) 81'; Gannon (yellow card) 90'	Stadium: Gillette Stadium; Referee: Chris Ruska

May 14, 2022 7	Toronto FC II	0–1	New England Revolution II	Toronto, Ontario
7:00 PM EDT	Coello (yellow card) 50'	Report	Lima (yellow card) 28'; Dias 47'; Cayet (yellow card) 59'; Zwetsloot (yellow card) 85'; Silva (yellow card) 90+5'	Stadium: BMO Training Ground; Referee: Michael Venne

May 22, 2022 8	FC Cincinnati 2	0–1	New England Revolution II	Highland Heights, Kentucky
5:00 PM EDT	Marshall (yellow card) 16'; Robledo (yellow card) 18'; Ordonez (yellow card) 90+2'	Report	Dias 53'; Rozhansky (yellow card) 59'; O'Hearn (yellow card) 90+5'	Stadium: NKU Soccer Stadium; Referee: Elvis Osmanovic

May 27, 2022 9	New England Revolution II	1–0	Philadelphia Union II	Foxborough, Massachusetts
7:00 PM EDT	N Buck (yellow card) 25'; Silva 34'; Italo (yellow card) 90+1'	Report	Nkanji (yellow card) 24'; Westfield (yellow card) 32'; Diallo (yellow card) 49'	Stadium: Gillette Stadium; Referee: Joshua Encarnación

June 4, 2022 10	Inter Miami CF II	2–0	New England Revolution II	Fort Lauderdale, Florida
7:00 PM EDT	Bagley (yellow card) 18', (goal) 56'; Caputo (yellow card) 30'; Hundal 38'; Ruiz (yellow card) 44'	Report	Borrero (yellow card) 90+3'; Ítalo (yellow card) 90+4'	Stadium: DRV PNK Stadium; Referee: Josiah Parke

June 11, 2022 11	New England Revolution II	2–1	Orlando City B	Foxborough, Massachusetts
8:00 PM EDT	N Buck 5'; Rozhansky (yellow card) 38'; Dias 56'	Report	Otero (yellow card) 5'; Granados (yellow card) 44'; Forth (yellow card) 57'; Tablante (yellow card) 65'; Lynn 71'; Bravo (yellow card) 77'; Guadelupe (red card) 90+3'	Stadium: Gillette Stadium; Referee: José Carlos Rivero

June 18, 2022 12	New England Revolution II	1–1 (4–5 SO)	Rochester New York FC	Foxborough, Massachusetts
7:00 PM EDT	Ítalo (yellow card) 30'; Lima 59'	Report	Rayo 23'; Djaló (yellow card) 71'; Lopez (yellow card) 85'	Stadium: Gillette Stadium; Referee: Lorenzo Hernandez

June 26, 2022 13	Chicago Fire FC II	4–3	New England Revolution II	Bridgeview, Illinois
5:00 PM EDT	Monis 13'; Bezerra 17', 76'; Quintos (yellow card) 20', (goal) 55'; Ritaccio (yellow card) 80'	Report	DeShields (yellow card) 3'; Ítalo (yellow card) 31'; Lima 33', (yellow card) 43'; Cayet 36'; Michel 90+3'	Stadium: SeatGeek Stadium; Referee: Esad Omanovic

July 3, 2022 14	Toronto FC II	1–1 (5–3 SO)	New England Revolution II	Toronto, Ontario
7:00 PM EDT	Altobelli (yellow card) 45'; Yeates (penalty scored) 84'; Pearlman (yellow card) 90+2'	Report	Ítalo (yellow card) 39'; Dias 50'; Rozhansky (yellow card) 72'; Cayet (yellow card) 87'	Stadium: York Lions Stadium; Referee: Mario Alayass
	Shootout
	Altobelli (penalty scored); Franklin (penalty scored); Antonoglou (penalty scored); Coello Camarero (penalty scored); Paul Rothrock (penalty scored)		Dias (penalty missed); Rozhansky (penalty scored); O'Hearn (penalty scored); Buck (penalty scored)

July 10, 2022 15	New England Revolution II	0–4	New York City FC II	Foxborough, Massachusetts
6:00 PM EDT	O'Hearn (yellow card) 45'; Michel (yellow card) 61'; Reveno (yellow card) 90'	Report	Denis 2', (penalty scored) 7', (penalty scored) 45', 45+3'; Bednarsky (yellow card) 72'; Turnbull (yellow card) 73'	Stadium: Gillette Stadium; Referee: John Rush

July 24, 2022 16	Columbus Crew 2	4–1	New England Revolution II	Columbus, Ohio
5:00 PM EDT	17 M. Vang 15', 30'; DeShields 44' (o.g.); 11 C. Gannon 74'; 30 W. Sands (yellow card) 75'	Report	Panayotou (yellow card) 21'; Reveno (yellow card) 26'; Dias 41'; Rozhansky (yellow card) 57'; O'Hearn (yellow card) 78'	Stadium: Historic Crew Stadium; Referee: Alex Connelly

July 31, 2022 17	New England Revolution II	0–2	Toronto FC II	Foxborough, Massachusetts
7:00 PM EDT	Spaulding (yellow card) 2'; Lima (yellow card) 34'; Reveno (yellow card) 52'; Zwetsloot (red card) 57'; Dias (yellow card) 56'; Rozhansky (yellow card) 63'	Report	Antonoglou (yellow card) 40'; Rothrock (yellow card) 44', (goal) 68', 73'; Gavran (yellow card) 58'; Goulbourne (yellow card) 67'; Carlini (yellow card) 76'	Stadium: Gillette Stadium; Referee: Shawn Tehini

August 7, 2022 18	Inter Miami CF II	4–2	New England Revolution II	Fort Lauderdale, Florida
7:00 PM EDT	Borgelin 17', 37', (penalty scored) 53'; Cremaschi 36'; Reyes (yellow card) 41'; Mendez (yellow card) 51'; Hardin (yellow card) 71'; Shea (yellow card) 74' dos Santos (yellow card) 87'	Report	Dias (yellow card) 39', (goal) 45+1'; Silva 68'; Cayet (yellow card) 78'; N Buck (yellow card) 90'	Stadium: DRV PNK Stadium; Referee: Gabriele Giusti

August 14, 2022 19	New England Revolution II	1–0	Chicago Fire FC II	Foxborough, Massachusetts
6:00 PM EDT	Cayet 52'; Michel (yellow card) 72'; Zwetsloot (yellow card) 76'; Quiñones (yellow card) 79'; Weinstein (yellow card) 90+3'	Report	Penn (penalty missed) 12'; Burks (yellow card) 42'; Ritaccio (yellow card) 77'	Stadium: Gillette Stadium; Referee: Gary Gutierrez

August 21, 2022 20	Philadelphia Union II	5–1	New England Revolution II	Chester, Pennsylvania
7:00 PM EDT	Riasco (yellow card) 20'; Real 54'; Bueno 61', 63'; Harriel 67'; Craig (yellow card) 77'; Diallo (yellow card) 78'; Sullivan 79'	Report	Rozhansky (yellow card) 30' (yellow-red card) , 36'; Silva (yellow card) 45+1'; Michel (yellow card) 64'; Quiñones 87'; DeShields (red card) 89'	Stadium: Subaru Park; Referee: Amiel Aleman

August 27, 2022 21	Rochester New York FC	2–0	New England Revolution II	Brighton, New York
7:00 PM EDT	Rayo (penalty scored) 5'; E. Williams 43'; Akanyirige (yellow card) 86'; Djaló (yellow card) 90+2'	Report	Cayet (yellow card) 69'; O'Hearn (yellow card) 78'; Quiñones (red card) 87'	Stadium: Monroe Community College; Referee: Albert Kyei-Mensah

September 2, 2022 22	New England Revolution II	2–0	Orlando City B	Foxborough, Massachusetts
7:00 PM EDT	Fry 40'; Italo 53', (yellow card) 90+1'; Lima (yellow card) 63'; Silva (yellow card) 70'	Report	Williams (yellow card) 32'; Loyola (yellow card) 48'; Reid-Brown (yellow card) 77'; Souza Santos (yellow card) 82'; Prebenda (yellow card) 89'	Stadium: Gillette Stadium; Referee: Wes Caouette

September 10, 2022 23	New York City FC II	0–0 (4–2 SO)	New England Revolution II	Queens, New York
8:00 PM EDT	Di Ponzio (yellow card) 64'	Report	Reveno (yellow card) 85'	Stadium: Belson Stadium; Referee: Nickrod Fateh
	Shootout
	Beer (penalty scored); Jimenez (penalty scored); Benalcazar (penalty scored); Gómez (penalty scored)		(penalty missed) Italo; (penalty scored) Silva; (penalty missed) Rozhansky; (penalty scored) Ryan Lima

September 18, 2022 24	New England Revolution II	1–3	Philadelphia Union II	Foxborough, Massachusetts
3:00 PM EDT	Weinstein (yellow card) 12'; Weverton (penalty missed) 42', (yellow card) 52'; Quiñónes (yellow card) 47'; Lima 79'	Report	Real 14', (yellow card) 43'; Rafanello 20'; Donovan 27'; Harriel (yellow card) 45'; Odada (yellow card) 52'; Sorenson (yellow card) 90'; Westfield (yellow card) 90+4'	Stadium: Gillette Stadium; Referee: Natalie Simon

== Statistics ==
=== Top scorers ===
Rank	Position	No.	Name	MLSNP
1	FW	39	(Brazil) Marcos Dias	6
2	FW	99	(Brazil) Ryan Lima	4
3	MF	72	(United States) Damian Rivera	3
4	MF	54	(United States) Jack Panayotou	2
4	MF	48	(Brazil) Michel	2
4	FW	36	(United States) Meny Silva	2
4	DF	44	(France) Pierre Cayet	2
8	DF	40	(United States) Sean O'Hearn	1
8	MF	29	(United States) Noel Buck	1
8	DF	41	(United States) Colby Quiñones	1
8	FW	89	(United States) Malcolm Fry	1
8	DF	52	(Brazil) Italo	1
Total				26

- Source: Team Stats
