= 2022 New England Revolution season =

American soccer season

New England Revolution
2022 season
- President: Brian Bilello
- Head Coach: Bruce Arena
- Stadium: Gillette Stadium
- MLS: Conference: 10th Overall: 20th
- U.S. Open Cup: Lost in round of 16
- MLS Cup: DNQ
- CONCACAF Champions League: Quarter-finals
- Highest home attendance: League/All: 35,455 (9/17 v. MTL)
- Lowest home attendance: League: 10,633 (3/12 v. RSL); All: 750 (5/11 v. CIN, USOC)
- Average home league attendance: 21,221
- Biggest win: League: ORL 0–3 NE (8/6); All: NE 5–1 CIN (5/11, USOC)
- Biggest defeat: MTL 4–0 NE (8/20)
Home colors	Away colors

The 2022 New England Revolution season was the club's 27th season of existence, and their 27th consecutive season playing in Major League Soccer, the top flight of American soccer. The season began on February 15 when the club began their play in the 2022 CONCACAF Champions League, while the MLS season began on February 26, where the Revolution entered as the defender Supporters' Shield winners. Outside of these two competitions, the Revolution will play in the 2022 U.S. Open Cup.

== Background ==
The 2021 season was the Revolution's 26th season of existence, and their 26th season in MLS, the top tier of American soccer. Due to the ongoing COVID-19 pandemic, the Revolution began the season on April 17, and the season concluded on November 7. The Revolution were slated to play in the 2022 U.S. Open Cup in addition to MLS play, but the tournament was cancelled by U.S. Soccer due to logistical challenges associated with the pandemic.

During the club regular season, the Revolution amassed a total of 73 points, off of a record of 22–5–7, which set the record for the most points obtained in the regular season. At the end of the regular season, manager Bruce Arena won the Sigi Schmid Coach of the Year Award, for the best coach of the 2021 season. Goalkeeper Matt Turner won the MLS Goalkeeper of the Year Award, and Carles Gil won the MLS Comeback Player of the Year Award. Four players from the Revolution were named to the MLS Best XI for the 2021 season, which was tied for the second most in league history. Turner, Gil, Tajon Buchanan, and Gustavo Bou were named to the Best XI.

Outside of MLS play, the club qualified for the 2021 MLS Cup Playoffs. In the Conference Semifinals (or Quarterfinals), the Revolution lost to eventual MLS Cup finalist, New York City FC on penalties, ending their hopes to be the first MLS team to complete the league double (winning both the Supporters' Shield and MLS Cup) since 2017.

== Club ==
=== Roster ===
Appearances and goals are career totals from all-competitions.

Squad No.	Name	Nationality	Position(s)	Date of birth (age)	Signed from	Games played	Goals scored
Goalkeepers
36	Earl Edwards Jr.	(United States)	GK	29 December 1996 (aged 24)	(United States) D.C. United	6	0
18	Brad Knighton	(United States)	GK	6 February 1985 (aged 36)	(United States) UNCW	65	0
94	Clément Diop	(France)	GK	13 October 1993 (aged 28)	(United States) Inter Miami FC	50	0
98	Jacob Jackson	(United States)	GK	25 April 2000 (aged 21)	(United States) Loyola Marymount Lions	0	0
99	Djordje Petrovic	(Serbia)	GK	8 October 1999 (aged 22)	(Serbia) FK Čukarički	0	0
Defenders
2	Andrew Farrell	(United States)	DF	2 April 1992 (aged 29)	(United States) Louisville Cardinals	274	2
3	Omar Gonzalez	(United States)	DF	11 October 1988 (aged 33)	(Canada) Toronto FC	331	19
4	Henry Kessler	(United States)	DF	25 June 1998 (aged 23)	(United States) Virginia Cavaliers	53	2
6	Christian Makoun	(Venezuela)	DF	5 March 2000 (aged 21)	(United States) Charlotte FC	0	0
15	Brandon Bye	(United States)	DF	29 November 1995 (aged 25)	(United States) Western Michigan Broncos	107	6
23	Jonathan Bell	(United States)	DF	26 August 1997 (aged 24)	(United States) UMBC Retrievers	12	1
24	DeJuan Jones	(Canada) (United States)	DF	24 June 1996 (aged 25)	(United States) Michigan State Spartans	72	4
28	A.J. DeLaGarza	(Guam) (United States)	DF	4 November 1987 (aged 34)	(United States) Inter Miami CF	11	0
34	Ryan Spaulding	(United States)	DF	10 September 1998 (aged 23)	(United States) Revs II	2	0
77	Ben Reveno	(United States)	DF	29 March 1999 (aged 22)	(United States) Revs II	0	0
Midfielders
5	Wilfrid Kaptoum	(Cameroon) (Spain)	MF	7 July 1996 (aged 25)	(Spain) Betis	21	1
8	Matt Polster	(United States)	MF	8 June 1996 (aged 25)	(Scotland) Rangers	53	2
10	Carles Gil	(Spain)	MF	22 November 1992 (aged 28)	(Spain) Deportivo La Coruña	68	14
11	Emmanuel Boateng	(Ghana) (United States)	MF	17 January 1994 (aged 27)	(United States) Columbus Crew	16	3
13	Maciel	(Brazil)	MF	18 January 2000 (aged 21)	(Brazil) Botafogo	19	0
17	Sebastian Lletget	(United States)	MF	3 September 1992 (aged 29)	(United States) LA Galaxy	158	23
25	Arnór Ingvi Traustason	(Iceland)	MF	30 April 1993 (aged 28)	(Sweden) Malmö FF	31	2
26	Tommy McNamara	(Republic of Ireland) (United States)	MF	6 February 1991 (aged 30)	(United States) Houston Dynamo FC	48	2
27	Dylan Borrero	(Colombia)	MF	5 January 2002 (aged 19)	(Brazil) Atlético Mineiro	0	0
29	Noel Buck	(United States)	MF	5 April 2005 (aged 16)	(United States) Revs II	7	1
31	Nacho Gil	(Spain)	MF	9 September 1995 (aged 26)	(Spain) FC Cartagena	0	0
47	Esmir Bajraktarevic	(United States)	MF	10 March 2005 (aged 16)	(United States) Revs II	0	0
72	Damian Rivera	(Guatemala) (United States)	MF	8 December 2002 (aged 18)	(United States) Revs II	1	0
Forwards
7	Gustavo Bou	(Argentina)	FW	18 February 1990 (aged 31)	(Mexico) Tijuana	67	32
9	Giacomo Vrioni	(Albania)	FW	15 October 1998 (aged 23)	(Italy) Juventus FC	0	0
12	Justin Rennicks	(United States)	FW	20 March 1999 (aged 22)	(United States) Indiana Hoosiers	10	1
14	Jozy Altidore	(United States)	FW	6 November 1989 (aged 32)	(United States) Toronto FC	6	1
22	Ismael Tajouri-Shradi	(Austria)	FW	28 March 1994 (aged 27)	(United States) Los Angeles FC	0	0

== Non-competitive ==
=== Preseason exhibitions ===
January 29 1	Los Angeles FC	1–1	New England Revolution	Los Angeles, CA
15:00 EST	Murillo (red card) 25'; Fall 86' (pen.)	Report	Buksa 44'	Stadium: Banc of California Stadium

February 5 2	LA Galaxy	4–0	New England Revolution	Carson, CA
22:30 EST	Cabral 12' (Chicharito), 47' (Araujo); Joveljić 63' (Kljestan); 70' (o.g.)	Report		Stadium: Dignity Health Sports Park

February 17 3	New England Revolution	2–0	Hartford Athletic	Foxborough, MA
14:00 EST	Bou; McNamara	NER Tweet		Stadium: Gillette Stadium

February 22 4	New England Revolution	4–1	El Paso Locomotive FC	Foxborough, MA
14:00 EST	Bou 26', 30' (Bye); Lletget 29' (Buksa) (2nd half)	NER Tweet; ELP Tweet	Velásquez 14'	Stadium: Gillette Stadium

== Competitive ==
=== Major League Soccer ===
==== Results ====
February 26 1	Portland Timbers	2–2	New England Revolution	Portland, Oregon
19:30 EST	Van Rankin (yellow card) 22'; Asprilla (yellow card) 28', (goal) 60'; Tuiloma (yellow card) 53'; Chará 78'; Bravo (yellow card) 84'	Report	Bye 41'; Lletget 63'; McNamara (yellow card) 70'; Polster (yellow card) 76'	Stadium: Providence Park; Attendance: 23,411; Referee: Chris Penso

March 5 2	New England Revolution	1–0	FC Dallas	Foxborough, Massachusetts
13:30 EST	Gil 45+2' (pen.); Polster (yellow card) 78'	Report	Pomykal (yellow card) 22'; Obrian (yellow card) 53'	Stadium: Gillette Stadium; Attendance: 14,554; Referee: Ted Unkel

March 12 3	New England Revolution	2–3	Real Salt Lake	Foxborough, Massachusetts
7:30 PM EST	Trauastason (yellow card) 5'; Kaptoum (yellow card) 16'; Boateng 45+3'; Altidore 62'; Gil (yellow card) 88'	Report	Ruíz (yellow card) 35'; Caldwell (yellow card) 66'; Córdova 78'; Glad 88', (yellow card) 90+2'; Schmitt 90+3'	Stadium: Gillette Stadium; Attendance: 10,633; Referee: Drew Fischer

March 19 4	Charlotte FC	3–1	New England Revolution	Charlotte, North Carolina
7:00 PM EDT	Świderski 6' 57'; Alcívar (yellow card) 29'; Kahlina (yellow card) 53'; Bender 64'; Franco (yellow card) 89'; Armour (yellow card) 90+5'	Report	Gonzalez (yellow card) 29'; Gil 54' (pen.); Bye (yellow card) 90+2'	Stadium: Bank of America Stadium; Attendance: 29,318; Referee: Marcos de Oliviera

April 2 5	New England Revolution	0–1	New York Red Bulls	Foxborough, Massachusetts
7:30 PM EDT	Kessler (yellow card) 25'; Buksa (yellow card) 90+3' (yellow-red card) 90+4'	Report	Amaya (yellow card) 33' (yellow-red card) 73'; Barlow (yellow card) 35'; Yearwood (yellow card) 45'; Polster 90' (o.g.)	Stadium: Gillette Stadium; Attendance: 16,265; Referee: Victor Rivas

April 9 6	Inter Miami CF	3–2	New England Revolution	Fort Lauderdale, Florida
5:00 PM EDT	Mota (yellow card) 7'; Campana 17', 23', 88'; Gregore (yellow card) 65'; Lowe (yellow card) 65'; Rodríguez (yellow card) 90+1'	Report	Rennicks 11'; McNamara (yellow card) 19'; Lletget (yellow card) 59'; Gil 67' (pen.); Kessler (yellow card) 82'; Polster (yellow card) 84'	Stadium: DRV PNK Stadium; Referee: Ramy Touchan

April 16 7	New England Revolution	2–1	Charlotte FC	Foxborough, Massachusetts
7:30 PM EDT	Buksa 8'; Polster (yellow card) 29', (goal) 72'; Bye (yellow card) 87'	Report	Makoun (yellow card) 57'; Ortiz 85'	Stadium: Gillette Stadium; Attendance: 15,344; Referee: Pierre-Luc Lauziere

April 23 8	D.C. United	3–2	New England Revolution	Washington, DC
7:30 PM EDT	Fountas 26' 43'; Gressel (yellow card) 33'; Estrada 39'	Report	Bye 6'; Jones (yellow card) 65'; Buksa 86' (yellow card) 87'; Kessler (yellow card) 89'	Stadium: Audi Field; Attendance: 17,131; Referee: Marcos de Oliviera

April 30 9	New England Revolution	2–0	Inter Miami CF	Foxborough, Massachusetts
3:00 PM EDT	Rivera 1'; Buksa 64'; WKaptoum (yellow card) 90'	Report	Gregore (yellow card) 28'; Lowe (yellow card) 54' (yellow-red card) 60'; Quinteros (yellow card) 55' (yellow-red card) 76'	Stadium: Gillette Stadium; Attendance: 25,509; Referee: Ismail Elfath
Note: The match was originally scheduled to kick-off at 5:00 PM EDT before moving to 3:00 PM EDT.

May 7 10	New England Revolution	2–2	Columbus Crew SC	Foxborough, Massachusetts
7:30 PM EDT	Farrell (yellow card) 58'; Jones 70'; Buksa 82'	Report	Berry 27'; Morris (yellow card) 41'; Artur (yellow card) 60'; Hurtado 89'	Stadium: Gillette Stadium; Attendance: 26,421; Referee: Nima Saghafi

May 15 11	Atlanta United FC	2–2	New England Revolution	Atlanta, Georgia
2:00 PM EDT	Almada 15'; Araújo 63'; Gutman (yellow card) 68'	Report	Buksa 30' 55'; McNamara (yellow card) 87'; Polster (yellow card) 90+3'	Stadium: Mercedes-Benz Stadium; Attendance: 42,516; Referee: Allen Chapman

May 21 13	FC Cincinnati	2–3	New England Revolution	Cincinnati, Ohio
6:00PM EDT	Nwobodo (yellow card) 23'; Vazquez 26'; Barreal 58'	Report	Rivera (yellow card) 5'; Lletget 17'; Buksa 43'; McNamara 89'; Boateng (yellow card) 90+3'	Stadium: TQL Stadium; Attendance: 22,844; Referee: Silviu Petrescu

May 28 13	New England Revolution	1–1	Philadelphia Union	Foxborough, Massachusetts
7:30 PM EDT	Bou (yellow card) 52', (goal) 75' (pen.)	Report	Burke (yellow card) 63'; Uhre 77'; McGlynn (yellow card) 80'; Martínez (yellow card) 90+2'	Stadium: Gillette Stadium; Attendance: 20,398; Referee: Jon Freemon

June 12 14	Sporting Kansas City	1–2	New England Revolution	Kansas City, Kansas
3:00 PM EDT	Ford (yellow card) 34'; Rosell (yellow card) 45+2' (yellow-red card) 48'; Russell 52'	Report	Bou (yellow card) 7', (goal) 30'; Polster (yellow card) 24'; Farrell (yellow card) 50'; Jones (yellow card) 55'; Boateng 87'	Stadium: Children's Mercy Park; Attendance: 18,703; Referee: Chris Penso

June 15 (was June 29) 15	New England Revolution	1–1	Orlando City SC	Foxborough, Massachusetts
7:30 PM EDT	Gil 22'; Kaptoum (yellow card) 24'; Farrell (yellow card) 27'; Borrero (yellow card) 56'; Jones (yellow card) 60'	Report	Jansson (yellow card) 6', (goal) 35'; Mulraney (yellow card) 44'; Schlegel (yellow card) 77'; Smith (yellow card) 88'	Stadium: Gillette Stadium; Attendance: 15,308; Referee: Ramy Touchan

June 19 16	New England Revolution	2–1	Minnesota United FC	Foxborough, Massachusetts
5:00 PM EDT	McNamara (yellow card) 13'; Farrell (yellow card) 36'; Borrero 53'; Bou 69'	Report	Reynoso 37' (pen.); Trapp (yellow card) 58'; Lod (yellow card) 68'; Dibassy (yellow card) 80'; Amarilla (yellow card) 80'; Lawrence (yellow card) 84'	Stadium: Gillette Stadium; Attendance: 21,289; Referee: Ismir Pekmic

June 26 17	Vancouver Whitecaps FC	0–0	New England Revolution	Vancouver, British Columbia
8:00 PM EDT	Dájome (yellow card) 24'	Report	McNamara (yellow card) 69'	Stadium: BC Place; Attendance: 15,084; Referee: Filip Dujic

July 3 18	New England Revolution	2–2	FC Cincinnati	Foxborough, Massachusetts
7:30 PM EDT	Borrero 30'; Bou (yellow card) 38' (goal) 55'	Report	Kessler 41' (o.g.); Powell (yellow card) 44'; Brenner 73'; Acosta (yellow card) 76'	Stadium: Gillette Stadium; Attendance: 20,193; Referee: Jon Freemon

July 9 19	New York City FC	4–2	New England Revolution	New York, New York
1:00 PM EDT	Martins 10' (pen.); Castellanos (yellow card) 36' (goal) 44' (pen.), 82'; Pereira 49'; Haak (yellow card) 70'	Report	Bou 18', 77'; Farrell (red card) 41'; Gil (yellow card) 84'	Stadium: Yankee Stadium; Referee: Timothy Ford

July 16 20	Philadelphia Union	2–1	New England Revolution	Chester, Pennsylvania
7:30 PM EDT	Uhre 75'; Gazdag 79' (pen.); Bedoya (yellow card) 90+4'	Report	Bou 61'	Stadium: Subaru Park; Attendance: 18,257; Referee: Rubiel Vazquez

July 23 21	Columbus Crew SC	0–0	New England Revolution	Columbus, Ohio
7:30 PM EDT		Report	McNamara (yellow card) 23'; Jones (yellow card) 35'; Bye (yellow card) 39'	Stadium: Lower.com Field; Attendance: 20,383; Referee: Silviu Petrescu

July 30 22	New England Revolution	0–0	Toronto FC	Foxborough, Massachusetts
8:00 PM EDT		Report		Stadium: Gillette Stadium; Attendance: 29,097; Referee: Ismir Pekmic

August 6 23	Orlando City SC	0–3	New England Revolution	Orlando, Florida
7:30 PM EDT	Carlos (yellow card) 6'; Jansson (yellow card) 66'; Araújo (yellow card) 85'	Report	Polster 20'; Kaptoum 51'; Kessler 75'	Stadium: Exploria Stadium; Referee: Ramy Touchan

August 13 24	New England Revolution	1–0	D.C. United	Foxborough, Massachusetts
7:30 PM EDT	Gil 18'	Report	Pálsson (yellow card) 81'; Hopkins (yellow card) 84'	Stadium: Gillette Stadium; Attendance: 24,240; Referee: Malik Badawi

August 17 25	Toronto FC	2–2	New England Revolution	Toronto, Ontario
7:30 PM EDT	Bernardeschi 31' (pen.); Akinola (yellow card) 35'; Criscito 75'; Laryea (yellow card) 78'	Report	Makoun (yellow card) 29'; McNamara 37'; Rennicks 48'	Stadium: BMO Field; Attendance: 28,464; Referee: Fotis Bazakos

August 20 26	CF Montreal	4–0	New England Revolution	Montreal, Quebec
7:30 PM EDT	Kamara 26'; Quioto 39', 55'; Corbo (yellow card) 82'; Miljevic 90+1' (pen.)	Report	Carles Gil (yellow card) 88'	Stadium: Saputo Stadium; Attendance: 19,619; Referee: Chris Penso

August 28 27	New England Revolution	1–2	LA Galaxy	Foxborough, Massachusetts
8:00 PM EDT	Kessler (yellow card) 38'; Gil 82'	Report	Aguirre 4'; Chicharito 15', (yellow card) 70'; Brugman (yellow card) 52'; Gasper (yellow card) 57'	Stadium: Gillette Stadium; Attendance: 21,517; Referee: Lukasz Szpala

August 31 28	New England Revolution	0–0	Chicago Fire FC	Foxborough, Massachusetts
7:30 PM EDT	Navarro (yellow card) 29'; Pineda (yellow card) 76'	Report	Kessler (yellow card) 21'	Stadium: Gillette Stadium; Attendance: 13,325; Referee: Marcos de Oliveira

September 4 29	New England Revolution	3–0	New York City FC	Foxborough, Massachusetts
8:00 PM EDT	Bell 12'; Buck 33', (yellow card) 41'; McNamara 66'	Report		Stadium: Gillette Stadium; Attendance: 17,793; Referee: Guido Gonzales Jr.

September 10 30	New York Red Bulls	2–1	New England Revolution	Harrison, New Jersey
6:00 PM EDT	Cásseres 58'; Morgan 78' (pen.); Clark (yellow card) 90+5'	Report	McNamara 53'; Bou (yellow card) 81'	Stadium: Red Bull Arena; Attendance: 16,301; Referee: Alex Chilowicz

September 14 31	Houston Dynamo FC	3–1	New England Revolution	Houston, Texas
8:30 PM EDT	Quintero 37'; Picault (yellow card) 51', (goal) 76' (pen.), 85'; Cerén (yellow card) 67'	Report	Farrell (yellow card) 31'; Gil 63' (pen.); McNamara (yellow card) 74'	Stadium: PNC Stadium; Attendance: 10,305; Referee: Ismail Elfath

September 17 32	New England Revolution	0–1	CF Montreal	Foxborough, Massachusetts
7:30 PM EDT		Report	Kamara (yellow card) 56'; Mihailovic (yellow card) 68'; Johnston 72'	Stadium: Gillette Stadium; Attendance: 35,455; Referee: Rosendo Mendoza

October 1 33	New England Revolution	2–1	Atlanta United FC	Foxborough, Massachusetts
1:00 PM EDT	N Gil (yellow card) 22'; Vrioni 32' (pen.); McNamara (yellow card) 43'; Bou 85'	Report	Sosa (yellow card) 5'; Gutman (yellow card) 45+1'; Martínez 81'	Stadium: Gillette Stadium; Attendance: 33,421; Referee: Armando Villarreal

October 9 34	Chicago Fire FC	1–1	New England Revolution	Chicago, Illinois
TBD	Pineda (yellow card) 18'; Mueller (yellow card) 44'; Monis 90+2'	Report	Vrioni (yellow card) 57'; Borrero 88'; Makoun (yellow card) 90'	Stadium: Soldier Field; Attendance: 14,357; Referee: Michael Radchuk

=== U.S. Open Cup ===
May 11 Round of 32	New England Revolution	5–1	FC Cincinnati (MLS)	Foxborough, Massachusetts
7:00 PM EDT	Carles Gil 34' (pen.), 37', 54'; Adam Buksa 47', 57'	Report	Álvaro Barreal 12'	Stadium: Gillette Stadium; Attendance: 750; Referee: Lukasz Szpala

May 25 Round of 16	New York City FC (MLS)	1–0	New England Revolution	New York, New York
7:30 PM EDT	Rodríguez 94'	Report		Stadium: Belson Stadium; Referee: Luis Arroyo

=== CONCACAF Champions League ===
==== Round of 16 ====
February 15 First leg	Cavaly (Haiti)	0–3 walkover	(United States) New England Revolution	Foxborough, United States
6:00 PM EST				Stadium: Gillette Stadium
Note: Due to a suspension of CONCACAF competition matches in Haiti which has been in force since December 2021 due to safety and security concerns, the match cannot be held in Haiti. Instead, the first leg was intended to be played at New England Revolution's home stadium, Gillette Stadium where Cavaly AS would play as the home team. On February 15, 2022, Cavaly notified CONCACAF that the club was unable to play at the United States due to club being unable to obtain the necessary visas to play in the United States, officially causing Cavaly to withdraw from the competition and New England Revolution to advance to the quarterfinals.

February 22 Second leg	New England Revolution (United States)	Cancelled	(Haiti) Cavaly	Foxborough, United States
6:00 PM EST				Stadium: Gillette Stadium
Note: The match was cancelled due to Cavaly AS's inability to travel to the United States due to visa issues.

==== Quarterfinals ====
March 9, 2022 First Leg	New England Revolution (United States)	3–0	(Mexico) UNAM	Foxborough, Massachusetts
8:00 PM EST	Lletget 19'; Buksa 72', 90+2'	Report	Álvarez (yellow card) 64'	Stadium: Gillette Stadium; Attendance: 10,441; Referee: Said Martínez

March 16, 2022 Second Leg	UNAM (Mexico)	3–0 (a.e.t.) (3–3 agg.) (4–3 p)	(United States) New England Revolution	Mexico City, Mexico
10:15 PM EDT	Dinenno 33', 49'; Saucedo 59'	Report		Stadium: Estadio Olímpico Universitario; Referee: David Moran

== Transfers ==
=== Transfers in ===
Date	Position	No.	Name	From	Fee/notes	Ref.
December 16, 2021	MF	17	(United States) Sebastian Lletget	(United States) LA Galaxy	$500,000 GAM	
December 22, 2021	DF	3	(United States) Omar Gonzalez	(Canada) Toronto FC	Free	
January 18, 2022	MF	29	(United States) Noel Buck	(United States) New England Revolution II	Homegrown player	
February 14, 2022	FW	14	(United States) Jozy Altidore	(Canada) Toronto FC	Free	
February 15, 2022	GK	98	(United States) Jacob Jackson	(United States) Loyola Marymount Lions	2022 MLS SuperDraft pick	
February 18, 2022	DF	34	(United States) Ryan Spaulding	(United States) New England Revolution II	Free	
April 6, 2022	GK	99	(Serbia) Djordje Petrovic	(Serbia) FK Čukarički	Undisclosed Fee	
April 22, 2022	MF	27	(Colombia) Dylan Borrero	(Brazil) Atlético Mineiro	U-22 Initiative	
May 23, 2022	MF	47	(United States) Esmir Bajraktarevic	(United States) New England Revolution II	Homegrown player	
May 31, 2022	DF	77	(United States) Ben Reveno	(United States) New England Revolution II	2022 MLS SuperDraft pick	
Jul 5, 2022	FW	9	(Albania) Giacomo Vrioni	(Italy) Juventus	3.8 Million Dollar Fee Designated Player	
Aug 4, 2022	DF	6	(Venezuela) Christian Makoun	(United States) Charlotte FC	$400K GAM	
Aug 5, 2022	MF	22	(Austria) Ismael Tajouri-Shradi	(United States) Los Angeles FC	$400K GAM	
Aug 5, 2022	GK	94	(Senegal) (France) Clément Diop	(United States) Inter Miami FC	$125K GAM	
Aug 23, 2022	MF	31	(Spain) Nacho Gil	(Spain) FC Cartagena	Free	

=== Transfers out ===
Date	Position	No.	Name	To	Fee/notes	Ref.
December 3, 2021	DF	35	(United States) Collin Verfurth		Option declined	
December 3, 2021	MF	27	(Colombia) Luis Caicedo	(Colombia) Cortuluá	Free	
December 3, 2021	MF	6	(United States) Scott Caldwell	(United States) Real Salt Lake	Free	
December 31, 2021	FW	17	(Canada) Tajon Buchanan	(Belgium) Club Brugge	$7,000,000	
February 11, 2022; Effective June 20th	GK	30	(United States) Matt Turner	(England) Arsenal	$6,000,000	
March 30, 2022	FW	19	(Uganda) Edward Kizza	(United States) Memphis 901 FC	Loan	
June 10, 2022	FW	9	(Poland) Adam Buksa	(France) RC Lens	$10,000,000	
July 29, 2022	FW	14	(United States) Jozy Altidore	(Mexico) Club Puebla	Loan through Dec	
August 3, 2022	MF	17	(United States) Sebastian Lletget	(United States) FC Dallas	$600K GAM	
August 9, 2022	MF	25	(Iceland) Arnór Ingvi Traustason	(Sweden) IFK Norrköping	Mutually agreed to part ways	

=== MLS SuperDraft picks ===
2022 New England Revolution SuperDraft Picks
Round	Selection	Player	Position	College	Status
1	24	Jacob Jackson	GK	Loyola Marymount	Signed
2	52	Ben Reveno	DF	UCLA	Signed
3	80	Pass			

== Statistics ==
=== Top scorers ===
Rank	Position	No.	Name	MLS	U.S. Open Cup	MLS Cup	CCL	Total
1	FW	9	(Poland) Adam Buksa	7	2	0	2	11
2	MF	22	(Spain) Carles Gil	7	3	0	0	10
3	FW	7	(Argentina) Gustavo Bou	8	0	0	0	8
4	MF	26	(United States) Tommy McNamara	4	0	0	0	4
5	MF	27	(Colombia) Dylan Borrero	3	0	0	0	3
5	MF	17	(United States) Sebastian Lletget	2	0	0	1	3
7	DF	15	(United States) Brandon Bye	2	0	0	0	2
7	MF	11	(Ghana) Emmanuel Boateng	2	0	0	0	2
7	MF	8	(United States) Matt Polster	2	0	0	0	2
7	FW	12	(United States) Justin Rennicks	2	0	0	0	2
11	FW	14	(United States) Jozy Altidore	1	0	0	0	1
11	MF	72	(United States) Damian Rivera	1	0	0	0	1
11	DF	24	(United States) DeJuan Jones	1	0	0	0	1
11	MF	5	(Cameroon) Wilfrid Kaptoum	1	0	0	0	1
11	DF	4	(United States) Henry Kessler	1	0	0	0	1
11	DF	23	(United States) Jonathan Bell	1	0	0	0	1
11	FW	29	(United States) Noel Buck	1	0	0	0	1
11	FW	9	(Albania) Giacomo Vrioni	1	0	0	0	1
Total				47	5	0	3	55

- Source: Team Stats

=== Top assists ===
Rank	Position	No.	Name	MLS	U.S. Open Cup	MLS Cup	Total
1	MF	22	(Spain) Carles Gil	14	1	0	15
2	DF	15	(United States) Brandon Bye	7	2	0	9
3	DF	24	(United States) DeJuan Jones	7	0	0	7
4	MF	26	(United States) Tommy McNamara	5	1	0	6
5	MF	17	(United States) Sebastian Lletget	5	0	0	5
6	MF	11	(Ghana) Emmanuel Boateng	3	0	0	3
7	FW	9	(Poland) Adam Buksa	2	0	0	2
7	MF	8	(United States) Matt Polster	2	0	0	2
7	DF	2	(United States) Andrew Farrell	2	0	0	2
7	MF	27	(Colombia) Dylan Borrero	2	0	0	2
7	FW	7	(Argentina) Gustavo Bou	2	0	0	2
12	MF	25	(Iceland) Arnór Ingvi Traustason	1	0	0	1
12	MF	5	(Cameroon) Wilfrid Kaptoum	1	0	0	1
12	MF	13	(Brazil) Maciel	1	0	0	1
Total				54	4	0	58

- Source: Team Stats

=== Disciplinary record ===
No.	Pos.	Player	MLS			U.S. Open Cup			MLS Cup			Total		
No.	Pos.	Player	Booked	(yellow card) (yellow-red card)	Sent off (straight red)	Booked	(yellow card) (yellow-red card)	Sent off (straight red)	Booked	(yellow card) (yellow-red card)	Sent off (straight red)	Booked	(yellow card) (yellow-red card)	Sent off (straight red)
26	MF	(Republic of Ireland) Tommy McNamara	8	0	0	0	0	0	0	0	0	8	0	0
8	MF	(United States) Matt Polster	6	0	0	0	0	0	0	0	0	6	0	0
4	DF	(United States) Henry Kessler	5	0	0	1	0	0	0	0	0	6	0	0
2	DF	(United States) Andrew Farrell	5	0	1	0	0	0	0	0	0	5	0	1
24	DF	(United States) DeJuan Jones	4	0	0	0	0	0	0	0	0	4	0	0
7	FW	(Argentina) Gustavo Bou	4	0	0	0	0	0	0	0	0	4	0	0
15	DF	(United States) Brandon Bye	4	0	0	0	0	0	0	0	0	4	0	0
5	MF	(Cameroon) Wilfrid Kaptoum	3	0	0	0	0	0	0	0	0	3	0	0
10	MF	(Spain) Carles Gil	3	0	0	0	0	0	0	0	0	3	0	0
9	FW	(Poland) Adam Buksa	2	1	0	0	0	0	0	0	0	2	1	0
3	DF	(United States) Omar Gonzalez	2	0	0	0	0	0	0	0	0	2	0	0
6	DF	(United States) Christian Makoun	2	0	0	0	0	0	0	0	0	2	0	0
14	FW	(United States) Jozy Altidore	1	0	0	0	0	0	0	0	0	1	0	0
11	MF	(Ghana) Emmanuel Boateng	1	0	0	0	0	0	0	0	0	1	0	0
27	MF	(Colombia) Dylan Borrero	1	0	0	0	0	0	0	0	0	1	0	0
17	MF	(United States) Sebastian Lletget	1	0	0	0	0	0	0	0	0	1	0	0
72	MF	(United States) Damian Rivera	1	0	0	0	0	0	0	0	0	1	0	0
25	MF	(Iceland) Arnór Ingvi Traustason	1	0	0	0	0	0	0	0	0	1	0	0
29	MF	(United States) Noel Buck	1	0	0	0	0	0	0	0	0	1	0	0
9	FW	(Albania) Giacomo Vrioni	1	0	0	0	0	0	0	0	0	1	0	0
31	MF	(Spain) Nacho Gil	1	0	0	0	0	0	0	0	0	1	0	0
Total			57	1	1	1	0	0	0	0	0	58	1	1

- Source: Team Stats

=== Clean sheets ===
No.	Name	MLS	US Open Cup	MLS Cup	CCL	Total	Games
99	(Serbia) Djordje Petrovic	7	0	0	0	7	23
36	(United States) Earl Edwards Jr.	1	0	0	1	2	6
30	(United States) Matt Turner	1	0	0	0	1	5
18	(United States) Brad Knighton	0	0	0	0	0	4

- Source: Team Stats

== See also ==
- 2022 New England Revolution II season
