= Kaoru Fujiwara =

Japanese footballer

Personal information
- Full name: Kaoru Fujiwara
- Date of birth: October 17, 2001 (age 25)
- Place of birth: Obu, Aichi, Japan
- Height: 5 ft 8 in (1.73 m)
- Position: Midfielder

Team information
- Current team: Harvard Crimson
- Number: 23

Youth career
- Aichi FC
- Yumetaro FC
- 2015–2020: New England Revolution

College career
Years	Team	Apps	(Gls)
2020–	Harvard Crimson	24	(0)

Senior career*
Years	Team	Apps	(Gls)
2020	New England Revolution II	3	(0)
- * Club domestic league appearances and goals as of 4 January 2023

Kaoru Fujiwara (born 17 October 2001) is a Japanese professional footballer who plays as a midfielder for Harvard Crimson.

== Career ==
=== Youth ===
Fujiwara spent five years with the New England Revolution academy. He made an appearance for the club's USL League One side, New England Revolution II, on 25 July 2020, appearing as a 90th-minute substitute during a 0-0 draw with Union Omaha.

=== College ===
Fujiwara has committed to playing college soccer at Harvard University in 2020.

== Personal ==
Fujiwara was born in Obu, Aichi, Japan before moving to Lexington, Massachusetts in the United States when he was 14 years old. His brother, Hikaru, also plays in the New England Revolution academy.
