= Jacob Jackson (soccer) =

American soccer player (born 2000)

Personal information
- Full name: Jacob Daniel Jackson
- Date of birth: April 25, 2000 (age 26)
- Place of birth: San Diego, California, U.S.
- Height: 5 ft 11 in (1.80 m)
- Position: Goalkeeper

Team information
- Current team: Monterey Bay FC on loan from San Diego FC
- Number: 98

Youth career
- San Diego Soccer Club
- San Diego Surf
- Real Salt Lake

College career
Years	Team	Apps	(Gls)
2019–2021	Loyola Marymount	42	(0)

Senior career*
Years	Team	Apps	(Gls)
2018	Real Monarchs	0	(0)
2022–2024	New England Revolution	2	(0)
2022–2024	→ New England Revolution II (loan)	26	(0)
2024	San Jose Earthquakes	3	(0)
2024	→ The Town FC (loan)	5	(0)
2025	San Diego FC	0	(0)
2025	FC Dallas	4	(0)
2026–	San Diego FC	0	(0)
2026–	→ Monterey Bay FC (loan)	17	(0)
- * Club domestic league appearances and goals as of October 31, 2026

Jacob Daniel Jackson (born April 25, 2000) is an American professional soccer player who plays as a goalkeeper for Monterey Bay FC in the USL Championship on loan from Major League Soccer club San Diego FC.

== Career ==
=== College and amateur ===
Jackson was born in San Diego, California. He played in the youth soccer clubs San Diego Surf and Real Salt Lake Academy.

Jackson played his college career at Loyola Marymount between 2019 and 2021, making 42 appearances. In 2020 and 2021, Jackson was named the West Coast Conference Goalkeeper of the Year and an All-WCC First Team selection.

=== Professional ===
On January 18, 2022, Jackson was selected by the New England Revolution in the first round (24 overall) of the MLS SuperDraft. On February 15, 2022, Jackson signed with the Revs, keeping his college jersey number 98. Jackson was loaned to the Revolutions' MLS Next Pro affiliate, New England Revolution II for the 2022 season. Jackson won the Goalkeeper of the Month award in for May 2022.

Jackson made his MLS debut on October 14, 2023, recording seven saves in a 3–2 loss to Nashville SC. On October 21, 2023, Jackson made his home debut, and recorded his first win, in the Revolution's 2–1 win over the Philadelphia Union at Gillette Stadium in front of 41,355. Jackson was waived by New England on April 23, 2024.

He was subsequently claimed off waivers by the San Jose Earthquakes on April 29, 2024. Jackson was released by San Jose following their 2024 season and was again selected in the MLS Re-Entry Draft, this time by San Diego FC ahead of their inaugural season.

On July 30, 2025, FC Dallas acquired Jackson in exchange for a natural third-round pick in the 2026 MLS SuperDraft without making an appearance for San Diego FC. On September 6, Jackson made his debut after Michael Collodi was sent off with a red card in the 16th-minute against St. Louis City SC. Jackson conceded a single goal and made 12 saves, allowing Petar Musa to level the game and secure a draw. Jackson's 12 saves broke the league record for the most saves made by a substitute goalkeeper and tied Mark Dodd's 1996 club record for the most saves made by a goalkeeper in a match. Jackson also became the first keeper to register 12 saves in his first appearance for a club since Matt Napoleon in 1998. For his performance, he was named the Player of the Matchday. However, FC Dallas chose not to extend his contract with the team after the end of the season and became available for MLS free agency.

Jackson signed with MLS side San Diego FC, his second stint with the club, on March 7, 2026. On March 27, 2026 Monterey Bay FC of the USL Championship announced they had acquired Jackson on loan from San Diego FC for the remainder of the 2026 season.

== Career statistics ==
=== Club ===
As of match played September 27, 2025

Appearances and goals by club, season and competition
Club	Season	League			National cup		Playoffs		Continental		Other		Total	
Club	Season	Division	Apps	Goals	Apps	Goals	Apps	Goals	Apps	Goals	Apps	Goals	Apps	Goals
Real Monarchs	2018	USL Championship	0	0	—		0	0	—		—		0	0
New England Revolution	2022	Major League Soccer	0	0	0	0	—		—		0	0	0	0
New England Revolution	2023	Major League Soccer	2	0	0	0	1	0	0	0	0	0	3	0
New England Revolution	2024	Major League Soccer	0	0	—		—		0	0	—		0	0
New England Revolution	Total		2	0	0	0	1	0	0	0	0	0	3	0
New England Revolution II (loan)	2022	MLS Next Pro	14	0	—		—		—		—		14	0
New England Revolution II (loan)	2023	MLS Next Pro	12	0	—		2	0	—		—		14	0
New England Revolution II (loan)	2024	MLS Next Pro	1	0	—		—		—		—		1	0
New England Revolution II (loan)	Total		17	0	0	0	2	0	0	0	0	0	29	0
San Jose Earthquakes	2024	Major League Soccer	3	0	1	0	—		—		0	0	4	0
The Town FC (loan)	2024	MLS Next Pro	5	0	—		—		—		—		5	0
San Diego FC	2025	Major League Soccer	0	0	—		—		—		0	0	0	0
FC Dallas	2025	Major League Soccer	4	0	—		—		—		—		4	0
Total			31	0	1	0	3	0	0	0	0	0	45	0
