= Esmir Bajraktarević =

Bosnian footballer (born 2005)

- Bajraktarević with PSV in 2026

Personal information
- Date of birth: 10 March 2005 (age 21)
- Place of birth: Appleton, Wisconsin, United States
- Height: 1.75 m (5 ft 9 in)
- Position: Winger

Team information
- Current team: PSV
- Number: 19

Youth career
- SC Wave
- 2019–2020: Chicago Fire
- 2020–2021: SC Wave
- 2021: New England Revolution

Senior career*
Years	Team	Apps	(Gls)
2021–2023	New England Revolution II	36	(7)
2022–2025	New England Revolution	45	(3)
2025–	PSV	41	(5)

International career^{‡}
2022	United States U19	3	(1)
2023–2024	United States U23	6	(1)
2024	United States	1	(0)
2024–	Bosnia and Herzegovina	26	(2)
- * Club domestic league appearances and goals as of 8 November 2026 ‡ National team caps and goals as of 17 November 2026

Esmir Bajraktarević (pronounced [ěsmir bajraktâːreʋitɕ]; born 10 March 2005) is a professional footballer who plays as a winger for Eredivisie club PSV. Born in the United States, he plays for the Bosnia and Herzegovina national team.

Bajraktarević started his professional career at New England Revolution, playing first in its reserve team. He signed for Dutch club PSV in 2025, where he won the Eredivisie title in his debut season.

A former American youth international, Bajraktarević also made his senior international debut for the United States, before switching his allegiance to Bosnia and Herzegovina in 2024, earning over 20 caps since.

== Club career ==
=== New England Revolution ===
Bajraktarević started playing football at a local club SC Wave, before joining Chicago Fire's youth setup in 2019. The following year, he returned to SC Wave. A year later, he switched to New England Revolution's youth academy. In May 2022, he signed his first professional contract with the team. He made his professional debut playing for New England Revolution's reserve squad against Tormenta FC on 22 August 2021 at the age of 16. On 11 September, he scored his first professional goal against North Carolina FC.

Bajraktarević made his first-team debut in a U.S. Open Cup game against New York City FC on 26 May 2022. Three months later, he made his league debut against Toronto FC. On 8 August 2023, he scored his first goal for New England Revolution in a Leagues Cup match against Querétaro. Ten months later, he scored his first league goal for the side in a triumph over Nashville SC.

=== PSV ===
In January 2025, Bajraktarević was transferred to Dutch outfit PSV for an undisclosed fee. On 18 January, he made his official debut for the squad against Zwolle. Bajraktarević debuted in the UEFA Champions League away at Arsenal on 12 March. He won his first trophy with the club on 18 May, when they were crowned league champions. On 23 August, he scored a brace in a defeat of Groningen, which were his first goals for PSV.

== International career ==
After representing the United States at various youth levels, Bajraktarević made his senior international debut in a friendly game against Slovenia on 20 January 2024. However, in July, he decided that he would play for Bosnia and Herzegovina in the future.

In August, his request to change sports citizenship from American to Bosnian was approved by FIFA. Later that month, he received his first senior call up, for 2024–25 UEFA Nations League A matches against the Netherlands and Hungary. He debuted against the former on 7 September.

On 15 November 2025, in a 2026 FIFA World Cup qualifier against Romania, Bajraktarević scored his first senior international goal. On 31 March 2026, he scored the winning penalty in a penalty shoot-out against Italy in the UEFA World Cup qualifying playoffs to send Bosnia and Herzegovina to the 2026 FIFA World Cup.

In June 2026, Bajraktarević was named in Bosnia and Herzegovina's squad for the 2026 World Cup. He made his tournament debut in the opening group draw against Canada on 12 June.

== Personal life ==
Bajraktarević's parents, Elmir and Emina, were both born in Srebrenica. They survived the Srebrenica genocide in 1995, during which Bajraktarević's maternal grandfather, four uncles, and several other relatives were killed. Following the Bosnian War, the family spent some time as refugees in Switzerland before emigrating to the United States in 2001.

Esmir is the youngest of three children, with an older brother, Osman, and an older sister, Elma.

== Career statistics ==
=== Club ===
As of match played 8 November 2026

Appearances and goals by club, season and competition
Club	Season	League			National cup (Note: Includes U.S. Open Cup, KNVB Cup)		Continental		Other		Total	
Club	Season	Division	Apps	Goals	Apps	Goals	Apps	Goals	Apps	Goals	Apps	Goals
New England Revolution II	2021	USL League One	11	1	–		–		–		11	1
New England Revolution II	2022	MLS Next Pro	17	0	–		–		–		17	0
New England Revolution II	2023	MLS Next Pro	8	6	–		–		1 (Note: Appearance in MLS Next Pro Playoffs)	2	9	8
New England Revolution II	Total		36	7	–		–		1	2	37	9
New England Revolution	2022	Major League Soccer	3	0	1	0	–		–		4	0
New England Revolution	2023	Major League Soccer	13	0	2	0	1 (Note: Appearance in Leagues Cup)	1	0	0	16	1
New England Revolution	2024	Major League Soccer	29	3	0	0	8 (Note: Six appearances, one goal in CONCACAF Champions Cup; two appearances in Leagues Cup)	1	–		37	4
New England Revolution	Total		45	3	3	0	9	2	0	0	57	5
PSV	2024–25	Eredivisie	4	0	0	0	1 (Note: Appearance(s) in UEFA Champions League)	0	–		5	0
PSV	2025–26	Eredivisie	28	4	4	3	4	0	0	0	36	7
PSV	2026–27	Eredivisie	8	1	0	0	2	0	1 (Note: Appearance in Johan Cruyff Shield)	0	11	1
PSV	Total		40	5	4	3	7	0	1	0	52	8
Career total			121	15	7	3	16	2	2	2	146	22

=== International ===
As of match played 17 November 2026

Appearances and goals by national team and year
National team	Year	Apps	Goals
United States
United States	2024	1	0
United States	Total	1	0
Bosnia and Herzegovina
Bosnia and Herzegovina	2024	6	0
Bosnia and Herzegovina	2025	6	1
Bosnia and Herzegovina	2026	14	1
Bosnia and Herzegovina	Total	26	2
Career total		27	2

Scores and results list Bosnia and Herzegovina's goal tally first, score column indicates score after each Bajraktarević goal.

List of international goals scored by Esmir Bajraktarević
No.	Date	Venue	Cap	Opponent	Score	Result	Competition
1	15 November 2025	Bilino Polje, Zenica, Bosnia and Herzegovina	11	Romania	2–1	3–1	2026 FIFA World Cup qualification
2	17 November 2026	Bilino Polje, Zenica, Bosnia and Herzegovina	26	Romania	2–1	2–1	2026–27 UEFA Nations League B

== Honours ==
PSV

- Eredivisie: 2024–25, 2025–26
- Johan Cruyff Shield: 2025
