= Ben Reveno =

American soccer player

Personal information
- Full name: Benjamin Reveno
- Date of birth: March 29, 1999 (age 27)
- Place of birth: San Jose, California, United States
- Height: 6 ft 1 in (1.85 m)
- Position: Defender

Youth career
- –2017: San Jose Earthquakes

College career
| Years | Team | Apps | (Gls) |
| 2017–2018 | UC Irvine Anteaters | 10 | (0) |
| 2019–2021 | UCLA Bruins | 49 | (1) |

Senior career*
| Years | Team | Apps | (Gls) |
| 2022 | New England Revolution II | 20 | (0) |
| 2022–2023 | New England Revolution | 1 | (0) |
| 2023 | → Birmingham Legion (loan) | 10 | (0) |
| 2023 | → Indy Eleven (loan) | 6 | (0) |
- * Club domestic league appearances and goals as of December 19, 2023

Ben Reveno (born March 29, 1999) is an American professional soccer player.

== Career ==
=== College and amateur ===
Reveno was born in San Jose, California. He played two years at UC Irvine in 2017–18 before moving to UCLA between 2019 and 2021, making 49 appearances. He was named to the 2021 All-Far West Region Second Team.

Reveno also played for San Jose Earthquakes Academy for three years.

=== Professional ===
On January 18, 2022, Reveno was selected by the New England Revolution in the second round (52 overall) of the Major League Soccer SuperDraft.

On February 2, 2022, Reveno signed with the Revs second team, MLS Next Pro side New England Revolution II.

On May 25, 2022, Reveno started for the first team in a US Open Cup match vs New York City FC. Six days later, Reveno signed with the first team.

On March 6, 2023, Reveno signed on a season-long loan with USL Championship side Birmingham Legion.

On August 7, 2023, Reveno moved on loan again to Indy Eleven, also in USL Championship.

Reveno was released by New England following their 2023 season.

== Career statistics ==
=== Club ===
As of match played Dec 14, 2023

Appearances and goals by club, season and competition
| Club | Season | League | | | National cup | | Continental | | Other | | Total | |
| Club | Season | Division | Apps | Goals | Apps | Goals | Apps | Goals | Apps | Goals | Apps | Goals |
|---|---|---|---|---|---|---|---|---|---|---|---|---|
| New England Revolution II | 2022 | MLS Next Pro | 20 | 0 | 0 | 0 | — | | 0 | 0 | 20 | 0 |
| New England Revolution | 2022 | MLS | 1 | 0 | 1 | 0 | — | | 0 | 0 | 2 | 0 |
| Birmingham Legion FC | 2023 | USL Championship | 11 | 0 | 0 | 0 | — | | 0 | 0 | 11 | 0 |
| Indy Eleven | 2023 | USL Championship | 6 | 0 | 0 | 0 | — | | 0 | 0 | 6 | 0 |
| Total | | | 38 | 0 | 1 | 0 | 0 | 0 | 0 | 0 | 39 | 0 |
