= Dylan Borrero =

Colombian footballer (born 2002)

Personal information
- Full name: Dylan Felipe Borrero Caicedo
- Date of birth: 5 January 2002 (age 24)
- Place of birth: Palmira, Colombia
- Height: 1.80 m (5 ft 11 in)
- Position: Winger

Team information
- Current team: Chapecoense
- Number: 77

Youth career
- Santa Fe

Senior career*
Years	Team	Apps	(Gls)
2019	Santa Fe	8	(0)
2020–2022	Atlético Mineiro	39	(3)
2022–2024	New England Revolution	37	(6)
2022	New England Revolution II	1	(0)
2025	Fortaleza	5	(0)
2025–2026	América de Cali	26	(5)
2026–	Chapecoense	1	(0)

International career^{‡}
2019	Colombia U17	4	(0)
2019	Colombia U18	1	(0)
2023–	Colombia	1	(0)
- * Club domestic league appearances and goals as of 11 December 2025 ‡ National team caps and goals as of 9 January 2020

Dylan Felipe Borrero Caicedo (born 5 January 2002) is a Colombian professional footballer who plays as a left winger for Chapecoense.

== Club career ==
Borrero started his career at Santa Fe, then joined Atlético Mineiro in 2020. The New England Revolution announced April 22, 2022, that they had signed Borrero to a three-year deal (with a one-year club option) as part of MLS' U22 initiative for a reported fee of $4.5 million. Atlético Mineiro would retain a 20% sell-on fee as part of the move.

Head coach Bruce Arena complimented Borrero's pace and technical play and noted the club had been monitoring Borrero for a year prior to the signing. Jonathan Sigal, writing in MLSoccer.com, stated that Borrero's arrival should help New England counterbalance the loss of Canadian winger Tajon Buchanan in the winter transfer window to Club Brugge.

On June 12, 2022, Borrero made his first start with his new club and subsequently recorded his first assist; a lobbed-pass to Gustavo Bou to put his team up 1–0 over Sporting Kansas City. The Revolution would go on to win the match 2–1.

Borrero would score his first goal for the Revolution the following week against Minnesota United FC, on a shot deflected off of a Minnesota defender past keeper Dayne St. Clair.

Borrero scored his first goal of the 2023 New England Revolution season in the club's home opener on March 4, 2023, opening the scoring in a 3–0 win over the Houston Dynamo FC. He scored his second goal on April 8, 2023, again opening the scoring for the Revolution in their 4–0 win over CF Montréal. His season was cut short on April 29, 2023, when he suffered an ACL tear in the Revolution's 1–1 draw with FC Cincinnati. The injury would rule him out for the remainder of the 2023 season. New England declined Borrero's contract option following their 2024 season.

He later played for Fortaleza and América de Cali. He joined Chapecoense in August 2026, signing a contract until December 2027.

== Career statistics ==
=== Club ===
As of 30 April 2023.

Club	Season	League			State League		Cup		Continental		Other		Total	
Club	Season	Division	Apps	Goals	Apps	Goals	Apps	Goals	Apps	Goals	Apps	Goals	Apps	Goals
Santa Fe	2019	Categoría Primera A	8	0	—		2	0	—		—		10	0
Atlético Mineiro	2020	Série A	6	0	2	0	1	0	1 (Note: Appearance(s) in Copa Sudamericana)	0	—		10	0
Atlético Mineiro	2021	Série A	15	2	6	0	2	0	3 (Note: Appearance(s) in Copa Libertadores)	0	—		26	2
Atlético Mineiro	2022	Série A	0	0	10	1	0	0	1	0	—		11	1
Atlético Mineiro	Total		21	2	18	1	3	0	5	0	0	0	47	3
New England Revolution	2022	MLS	12	3	—		1	0	—		—		13	3
New England Revolution	2023	MLS	8	2	—		1	0	—		0	0	9	2
New England Revolution	Total		20	5	0	0	2	0	0	0	0	0	22	5
Career total			49	7	18	1	7	0	5	0	0	0	79	8

== Honours ==
Atlético Mineiro

- Campeonato Brasileiro Série A: 2021
- Copa do Brasil: 2021
- Campeonato Mineiro: 2020, 2021, 2022
- Supercopa do Brasil: 2022
