= Dennis Ramirez =

American soccer player

Personal information
- Date of birth: August 19, 2001 (age 25)
- Place of birth: Waltham, Massachusetts, United States
- Height: 5 ft 11 in (1.80 m)
- Position: Midfielder

Team information
- Current team: Antigua
- Number: 70

Youth career
- 2017–2018: Boston Bolts
- 2018–2020: New England Revolution

Senior career*
Years	Team	Apps	(Gls)
2020–2021	New England Revolution II	14	(0)
2022–	Antigua	37	(0)
2024	→ Achuapa (loan)	11	(0)
- * Club domestic league appearances and goals as of April 3, 2024

Dennis Ramirez (born August 19, 2001) is an American professional soccer player who plays as a midfielder for Liga Nacional club Antigua.

== Career ==
=== Youth ===
Ramirez joined the New England Revolution academy in 2018 after a season with the Boston Bolts academy in the USSDA.

=== Professional ===
On March 11, 2020, Ramirez signed to the New England Revolution II squad ahead of their inaugural season in the USL League One. After missing the entire 2020 season due to injury, Ramirez made his professional debut on April 10, 2021, appearing as a 76th–minute substitute against Fort Lauderdale CF. Ramirez was not announced as a returning player for the club's 2022 season where they'd be competing in the newly formed MLS Next Pro.

== Personal ==
Ramirez is eligible to represent the United States and Guatemala at international level.
