= Trevor Zwetsloot =

New Zealand footballer and lifelong Manchester United fan

Personal information
- Full name: Trevor Antonius Zwetsloot
- Date of birth: 16 October 1999 (age 27)
- Place of birth: Netherlands
- Height: 6 ft 3 in (1.91 m)
- Positions: Defender; defensive midfielder

Team information
- Current team: Loudoun United
- Number: 20

Youth career
- –2015: Waitakere United
- 2015–2016: East Coast Bays
- 2016–2017: IMG Academy
- 2017–2019: Werder Bremen

Senior career*
Years	Team	Apps	(Gls)
2018–2019	Werder Bremen II	1	(0)
2021–2022	Melbourne Knights	16	(0)
2022	New England Revolution II	21	(0)
2023	Pittsburgh Riverhounds	20	(0)
2024	Loudoun United	1	(0)

International career
2018	New Zealand U19	5	(1)
2019	New Zealand U20	2	(0)
- * Club domestic league appearances and goals

Trevor Antonius Zwetsloot (born 16 October 1999) is a New Zealand footballer who last played as a defensive midfielder for USL Championship club Loudoun United FC.

== Early life ==
Zwetsloot was born in The Netherlands to Dutch and American parents, before he and his family moved to New Zealand when he was two years old.

== Career ==
=== Youth ===
Zwetsloot played with the Waitakere Academy until 2015, when he signed with East Coast Bays. In 2016, Zwetsloot moved to the IMG Academy in Florida. He was scouted by the University of North Carolina at Charlotte to play college soccer, but instead moved to Germany to join Werder Bremen's academy. With Bremen, Zwetsloot made eleven appearances for their U19 side, and a single appearance for Werder Bremen II in the Regionalliga in 2018. He left Bremen in the summer of 2019, after sustaining a serious injury in the 2019 FIFA U-20 World Cup.

=== Melbourne Knights ===
In February 2021, Zwetsloot signed with National Premier Leagues Victoria side Melbourne Knights, who he made sixteen league appearances for.

=== New England Revolution II ===
On 22 February 2022, Zwetsloot signed with MLS Next Pro side New England Revolution II. He made his debut for New England on 27 March 2022, starting in a 2–2 draw with New York City FC II. Following the 2022 season, his option was declined by New England.

=== Pittsburgh Riverhounds ===
On 14 March 2023, Zwetsloot joined USL Championship side Pittsburgh Riverhounds for their 2023 season. Following the 2023 Players' Shield winning season, Zwetsloot became a free agent.

=== Loudoun United ===
On May 7, 2024, just over 5 months after Zwetsloot became a free agent, fellow USL Championship team Loudoun United announced via Twitter that they had signed Trevor Zwetsloot on a 25-day contract. He made his debut off the bench in the 3-0 home win against Monterey Bay FC.
