= Đorđe Petrović (footballer) =

Serbian footballer (born 1999)

Đorđe Petrović Ђорђе Петровић
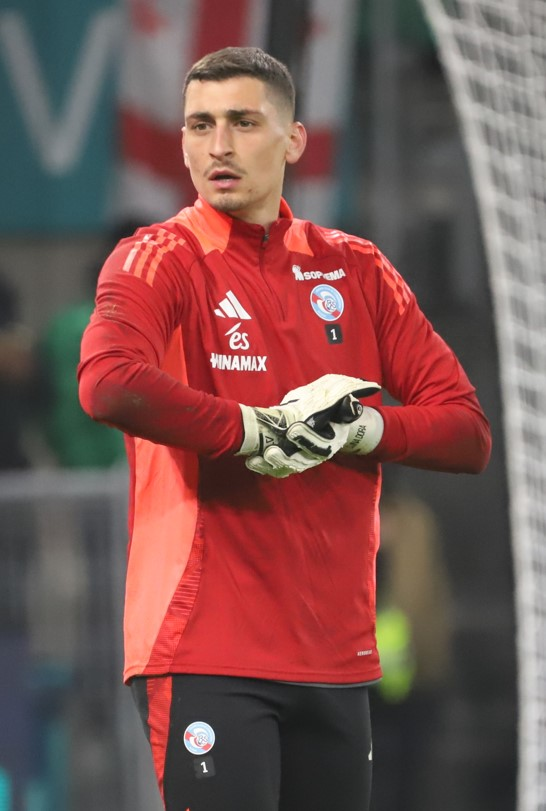
- Petrović playing for Strasbourg in 2024

Personal information
- Full name: Đorđe Petrović
- Date of birth: 8 October 1999 (age 27)
- Place of birth: Požarevac, Serbia, FR Yugoslavia
- Height: 1.94 m (6 ft 4 in)
- Position: Goalkeeper

Team information
- Current team: Bournemouth
- Number: 1

Youth career
- Rudar Kostolac
- Presing Požarevac
- 2014–2018: Čukarički

Senior career*
Years	Team	Apps	(Gls)
2018–2022	Čukarički	78	(0)
2018–2019	→ IMT (loan)	7	(0)
2022–2023	New England Revolution	43	(0)
2022	→ New England Revolution II (loan)	1	(0)
2023–2025	Chelsea	23	(0)
2024–2025	→ Strasbourg (loan)	31	(0)
2025–	Bournemouth	49	(0)

International career^{‡}
2020	Serbia U21	1	(0)
2021–	Serbia	14	(0)
- * Club domestic league appearances and goals as of 23:04, 21 November 2026 (UTC) ‡ National team caps and goals as of 23:10, 16 November 2026 (UTC)

Đorđe Petrović (Serbian Cyrillic: Ђорђе Петровић; born 8 October 1999), also known as Djordje Petrovic is a Serbian professional footballer who plays as a goalkeeper for Premier League club Bournemouth and the Serbia national team.

== Club career ==
=== FK Čukarički ===
Petrović was part of the FK Čukarički academy from 2014, going on to break in to the Serbian SuperLiga club's first team in 2019, following a loan to Serbian League club FK IMT for the 2018–19 season. Petrović made 78 league appearances for Čukarički, as well as four Serbian Cup appearances, and four UEFA Europa Conference League appearances.

=== New England Revolution ===
On 6 April 2022, Petrović signed with Major League Soccer club New England Revolution on a three-year deal for an undisclosed fee.

Petrović recorded his first clean sheet for his new club on 26 June 2022. Recording six saves in a 0–0 draw away at BC Place against the Vancouver Whitecaps. His efforts earned him a spot on the week 16 MLS Team of the Week. During the month of August Petrovic recorded 4 clean sheets, holding his opponents scoreless for a total of 371 minutes. He finished the 2022 season as a finalist for both the MLS Newcomer of the Year Award and the MLS Goalkeeper of the Year Award.

==== 2023 season ====
Petrović had a strong start to the 2023 season, becoming the fastest player in MLS history to record five penalty saves on 29 April 2023. According to data provided by Opta Sports, Petrović had outperformed his expected goals on target (xGOT) by 16.2 since he had joined the league. No other keeper had recorded an xGOT of anything beyond 5.5 in that timeframe.

Petrović recorded his sixth clean sheet on 3 June against New York City FC at Yankee Stadium. Petrović faced 20 shots during the match. During the match, The Athletic's Tom Bogert reported that Petrović was being scouted by Manchester United and the Serbia national team. On 27 June he was named to the 2023 MLS All-Star team, having led the league with 160 saves since his debut. On 20 July, MLS' Extratime Radio dubbed him their goalkeeper of the year in their midseason review.

On 30 July 2023, The Athletic reported that the Revolution had rejected transfer bids "in the region of $8 million plus add-ons" from FC Nantes and Nottingham Forest for Petrovic. As a result of the bids being rejected, Petrović sat out Revolution training and did not play in the Revolution's 3 August Leagues Cup match against Atlas FC.

=== Chelsea ===
Petrović joined Chelsea on 26 August 2023, signing a seven-year contract, with the option of a further year. Although the fee was officially undisclosed, it was reported to be worth an initial £12.5 million, plus £1.5 million in add-ons.

On 10 December 2023, Petrović made his official Premier League debut as a substitute to the injured Robert Sánchez in an away match against Everton, conceding a goal in added time in the 2–0 loss. On 16 December, he made his first start and kept his first clean sheet in a 2–0 victory against Sheffield United. Three days later, he saved a penalty from Matt Ritchie in the Carabao Cup quarterfinal game versus Newcastle United to take Chelsea to the semi-finals, with the game ending 1–1 at full time and 4–2 on penalties.

==== Loan to Strasbourg ====
On 30 August 2024, Petrović was loaned out to BlueCo-owned Ligue 1 club Strasbourg on a season-long deal. Petrović was named the club's player of the season, leading Strasbourg to a 7th place finish in Ligue 1 and qualifying for the UEFA Conference League.

=== Bournemouth ===
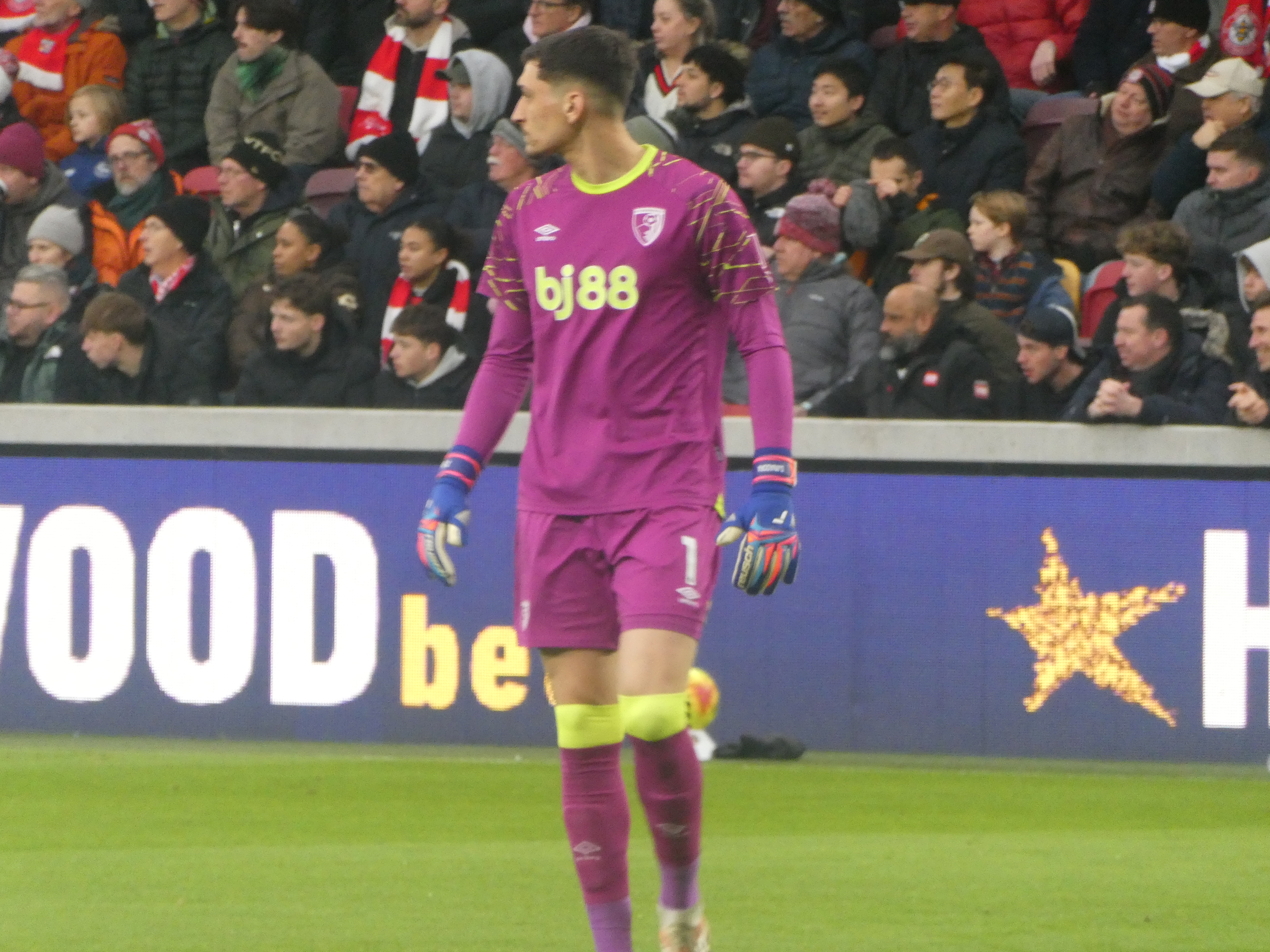
Petrović playing for Bournemouth in 2025

On 16 July 2025, Petrović signed a five-year contract with fellow Premier League side Bournemouth.

== International career ==
Petrović was called up to the Serbia U21 side in 2020, debuting against Poland. He debuted for the senior Serbia national team on 25 January 2021, starting in a 0–0 draw against the Dominican Republic.

Petrović was selected in Serbia's squad for the UEFA Euro 2024, but didn't make any appearances in the tournament.

Petrović made his first appearance in a competitive international tournament against Switzerland in the 2024–25 UEFA Nations League, where he kept the match to a 1–1 draw. Three days later, Petrović recorded a clean sheet against Denmark in a 0–0 draw.

On 7 June 2025, Petrović recorded a clean sheet in a World Cup qualifying match against Albania, in which he saved a penalty shot by Rey Manaj at the 45th minute.

== Style of play ==
Petrović is known for his quick reflexes, penalty saves, and saving goals from long range. Many pundits suggest that his style of play is similar to Thibaut Courtois at Chelsea.

== Personal life ==
Petrović married his wife Djina in December 2022. She gave birth to their first child, a girl, in June 2024.

== Career statistics ==
=== Club ===
As of match played 21 November 2026

Appearances and goals by club, season and competition
Club	Season	League			National cup (Note: Includes Serbian Cup, U.S. Open Cup, FA Cup)		League cup (Note: Includes EFL Cup)		Continental		Other		Total	
Club	Season	Division	Apps	Goals	Apps	Goals	Apps	Goals	Apps	Goals	Apps	Goals	Apps	Goals
Čukarički	2019–20	Serbian SuperLiga	21	0	4	0	—		—		—		25	0
Čukarički	2020–21	Serbian SuperLiga	34	0	0	0	—		—		—		34	0
Čukarički	2021–22	Serbian SuperLiga	23	0	0	0	—		4 (Note: Appearances in UEFA Europa Conference League)	0	—		27	0
Čukarički	Total		78	0	4	0	—		4	0	—		86	0
New England Revolution	2022	Major League Soccer	21	0	2	0	—		—		—		23	0
New England Revolution	2023	Major League Soccer	22	0	0	0	—		—		3 (Note: Appearances in Leagues Cup)	0	25	0
New England Revolution	Total		43	0	2	0	—		—		3	0	48	0
Chelsea	2023–24	Premier League	23	0	4	0	4	0	—		—		31	0
Strasbourg (loan)	2024–25	Ligue 1	31	0	0	0	—		—		—		31	0
Bournemouth	2025–26	Premier League	38	0	1	0	1	0	—		—		40	0
Bournemouth	2026–27	Premier League	11	0	0	0	0	0	2 (Note: Appearances in UEFA Europa League)	0	—		13	0
Bournemouth	Total		49	0	1	0	1	0	2	0	—		53	0
Career total			224	0	11	0	6	0	6	0	3	0	250	0

=== International ===
As of match played 16 November 2026

Appearances and goals by national team and year
National team	Year	Apps	Goals
Serbia	2021	1	0
Serbia	2022	0	0
Serbia	2023	1	0
Serbia	2024	3	0
Serbia	2025	6	0
Serbia	2026	3	0
Total		14	0

== Honours ==
Chelsea

- EFL Cup runner-up: 2023–24

Individual

- MLS All-Star: 2023
- RC Strasbourg Player of the Season: 2024–25
