= Tyler Freitas =

American soccer player

Personal information
- Full name: Tyler James Freitas
- Date of birth: July 2, 2000 (age 26)
- Place of birth: Providence, Rhode Island, United States
- Height: 5 ft 8 in (1.73 m)
- Position: Left-back

Youth career
- –2014: Bayside FC
- 2014–2019: New England Revolution

Senior career*
Years	Team	Apps	(Gls)
2019–2020	Colmenar Viejo	14	(0)
2021	New England Revolution II	9	(0)

International career
2017	United States U17	2	(0)
- * Club domestic league appearances and goals as of October 29, 2021

Tyler James Freitas (born July 2, 2000) is an American professional soccer player who plays as a defender.

== Career ==
=== Youth ===
Freitas played club soccer with Bayside FC, before joining the New England Revolution academy in 2014. In 2019, Freitas earned the 2019 UnitedHealthcare Revolution Academy Player of the Year Award. In 2019, he joined the club's first team squad on a pre-season tour of Spain.

=== Colmenar Viejo ===
In 2019, after graduating high school, Freitas had committed to playing college soccer at the University of Vermont. However, he instead opted to pursue a professional career and signed with sixth-tier Spanish side Colmenar Viejo. He made 14 appearances for the club during their 2019–2020 season.

=== New England Revolution II ===
In April 2021, Freitas returned to the United States to train with his former academy side New England Revolution. He signed a deal with the club's USL League One side New England Revolution II on April 16, 2021. He made his debut for the club on June 26, 2021, appearing as a 74th-minute substitute during a 3–0 win over North Texas SC. Freitas was not announced as a returning player for the club's 2022 season where they'd be competing in the newly formed MLS Next Pro.

== Personal ==
Tyler's brother, Justin, also played soccer with New England Revolution and Colmenar Viejo. Freitas holds a Portuguese passport and speaks fluent Portuguese.
