= Colby Quiñones =

Puerto Rican footballer

Personal information
- Full name: Colby Richard Quiñones
- Date of birth: April 14, 2003 (age 23)
- Place of birth: Biddeford, Maine, U.S.
- Height: 1.70 m (5 ft 7 in)
- Positions: Midfielder; full back

Youth career
- 2016–2017: Seacoast United
- 2017–2020: New England Revolution

Senior career*
Years	Team	Apps	(Gls)
2020–2024	New England Revolution II	89	(1)
2025	Portland Hearts of Pine	16	(0)

International career^{‡}
2021	Puerto Rico U20	2	(0)
2022–	Puerto Rico	11	(0)
- * Club domestic league appearances and goals as of October 25, 2025 ‡ National team caps and goals as of 22:22, 1 June 2025 (UTC)

Colby Richard Quiñones (born April 14, 2003) is a professional footballer who plays as a defender most recently for USL League One club Portland Hearts of Pine. Born in the mainland United States, he plays for the Puerto Rico national team.

== Early life ==
Born in Biddeford, Maine, and raised in Bedford, New Hampshire, Quiñones joined the New England Revolution academy from Seacoast United in 2017.

== Club career ==
Quiñones had committed to playing college soccer at Providence College in the fall of 2021. However, he signed a professional deal with New England Revolution II, then playing in the third-tier USL League One, on November 30, 2020, ahead of the team's 2021 season. He had made his debut on August 15, 2020, starting in a fixture against North Texas SC.

Quiñones stayed with the Revolution II as it departed USL1 in 2022 for the MLS-backed MLS Next Pro, also in the third tier. He remained with the Revolution II through the 2024 season, and left the Revolution II as the team's all-time leader in appearances made.

Quiñones returned to USL League One on January 17, 2025, when he joined Portland Hearts of Pine.

== International career ==
In 2021, Quiñones was called up to the Puerto Rico national football team January camp for games against Dominican Republic and Guatemala.
