= Michel (footballer, born 2001) =

Brazilian footballer

Personal information
- Full name: Michel Costa da Silva
- Date of birth: 20 December 2001 (age 24)
- Place of birth: Rio de Janeiro, Brazil
- Height: 1.65 m (5 ft 5 in)
- Position: Midfielder

Team information
- Current team: Felgueiras
- Number: 10

Youth career
- 2013–2020: Botafogo

Senior career*
Years	Team	Apps	(Gls)
2020–2022	New England Revolution II	45	(2)
2023–2025	Estoril	18	(0)
2025	→ Marítimo (loan)	13	(1)
2025–	Felgueiras	27	(0)
- * Club domestic league appearances and goals as of 20 June 2026

Michel Costa da Silva (born 20 December 2001) is a Brazilian professional footballer who plays as a midfielder for Liga Portugal 2 club Felgueiras.

== Career ==
=== Youth ===
Maciel spent eight years with the Botafogo academy. He appeared in 42 games and scored 2 goals for Botafogo's under-20 side.

=== New England Revolution II ===
On 8 December 2020, Michel joined USL League One side New England Revolution II ahead of their 2021 season. He made his professional debut on 17 April 2021, appearing as a 68th-minute substitute during a 3–0 loss to Richmond Kickers.

=== Estoril ===
On 31 January 2023, Michel signed for Portuguese Primeira Liga side Estoril, initially joining the club's U23s. About one year later, he started breaking into the first team.
