= Sean O'Hearn =

American soccer player (born 1998)

Personal information
- Date of birth: June 11, 1998 (age 28)
- Place of birth: Lancaster, Pennsylvania, U.S.
- Height: 1.81 m (5 ft 11 in)
- Position: Defender

Youth career
- 2011–2017: PA Classics

College career
Years	Team	Apps	(Gls)
2017–2020	Georgetown Hoyas	62	(0)

Senior career*
Years	Team	Apps	(Gls)
2018	North County United	7	(0)
2021–2022	New England Revolution II	46	(1)
2023–2024	One Knoxville	25	(0)

International career
2016–2017	United States U19	1	(0)
- * Club domestic league appearances and goals as of November 22, 2024

Sean O'Hearn (born June 11, 1998) is an American professional soccer player who plays as a defender.

== Career ==
=== Youth, College & Amateur ===
O'Hearn played with USSDA side PA Classics from 2011, before going to play college soccer at Georgetown University in 2017. O'Hearn played three full seasons with the Hoyas, making 62 appearances and as a rookie was named to the Big East All-Freshman Team. The Big East season was cancelled in 2020 due to the COVID-19 pandemic.

Whilst at college, O'Hearn played with USL League Two side North County United during their 2018 season.

=== Professional ===
On November 30, 2020, it was announced that O'Hearn had signed with USL League One side New England Revolution II ahead of their 2021 season. On January 21, 2021, O'Hearn was drafted 38th overall in the 2021 MLS SuperDraft by Minnesota United. However, he was not signed by Minnesota and remained with New England. His MLS rights were later traded to Toronto FC in March 2022.

On April 10, 2021, O'Hearn made his professional debut, starting against Fort Lauderdale CF in a 1–0 win.

On December 29, 2022, O'Hearn signed with USL League One side One Knoxville SC.
