= Collin Verfurth =

American soccer player

Personal information
- Date of birth: March 8, 1996 (age 30)
- Place of birth: Reston, Virginia, United States
- Height: 1.94 m (6 ft 4 in)
- Positions: Defender; midfielder

College career
Years	Team	Apps	(Gls)
2014–2017	Virginia Tech Hokies	72	(9)

Senior career*
Years	Team	Apps	(Gls)
2017	Reading United	0	(0)
2018	Northern Virginia United		
2019	Loudoun United	23	(0)
2020–2021	New England Revolution II	34	(0)
2020–2021	New England Revolution	0	(0)
- * Club domestic league appearances and goals as of October 29, 2021

Collin Verfurth (born March 8, 1996) is an American soccer player who plays as a defender.

== College ==
Verfurth played NCAA Division I college soccer for Virginia Tech Hokies in the Atlantic Coast Conference (ACC). In 2014 he appeared in 14 games, making 13 starts. In 2015 he played in 16 games with 15 starts including 2 goals and 11 shots on goal for the season. In 2016 Verfurth started 21 games recording 5 points for the season (2 goals & 1 assist). He also scored the game winning goals against Georgetown and Delaware. Later that season he led The Hokies to Elite Eight in NCAA Tournament. In 2017 he started and played 19 games while tallying 8 points for the season (4 goals including 2 game winners). He also scored the opening goal in the Hokies' First Round NCAA Tournament win over Air Force.

== Professional ==
It was announced on March 8, 2019, that Verfurth had signed with the Loudoun United for his first professional deal and he has played 9 games with Loudoun United as of 7 June 2019. Verfurth scored his first professional point with an assist against the Charlotte Independence in a 3–1 win for Loundoun United. By end of his debut season with United he played in 23 games totaling 1,968 minutes.

Verfurth was loaned to D.C. United and had his debut with the MLS club starting, and playing the entire game, in an international friendly against Real Betis of the Spanish First Division. He also made a full appearance for and international friendly against Marseille.

In January 2020, Verfurth joined USL League One expansion side New England Revolution II ahead of the 2020 season. He was among the first four players signed to the Revolution II. Verfurth started and wore the Captain's armband for 15 games of the 16 games for New England Revolution II, led the USL League One in clearances with 74. Totaled 84.7% passing accuracy, 88 duels and 39 aerial duels while winning over 60% of each, had 23 tackles, 14 interceptions, and 6 blocks.

On July 6, 2020, Verfurth joined New England's senior side in MLS. He was the first player in club history to ascend from the Revolution II roster to the MLS Club. His option year was exercised by the Revolution for the 2021 season. Following the 2021 season, Verfurth's contract option was declined.

== Honors ==
New England Revolution

- Supporters' Shield: 2021
