= Connor Presley =

American soccer player (born 1998)

Personal information
- Date of birth: July 4, 1998 (age 28)
- Place of birth: Austin, Texas, U.S.
- Height: 1.80 m (5 ft 11 in)
- Position: Winger

Youth career
- 2014–2016: FC Dallas
- 2017: Lonestar SC Academy

Senior career*
Years	Team	Apps	(Gls)
2016–2017	Nostell Miners Welfare	19	(12)
2017	Guiseley	0	(0)
2017–2018	San Antonio FC	29	(1)
2019	Loudoun United	28	(2)
2020–2022	New England Revolution II	33	(1)
- * Club domestic league appearances and goals as of September 19, 2022

Connor Presley (born July 4, 1998) is an American soccer player who plays as a midfielder.

== Career ==
After time with the FC Dallas academy side, Presley went to Europe and trialled with numerous teams. While in Europe, Presley played for non-league club Nostell Miners Welfare and also appeared in Guiseley in a West Riding County Cup fixture against Farsley Celtic.

Presley returned to the United States and spent time with the Lonestar SC academy before he signed with United Soccer League side San Antonio FC on August 10, 2017.

Loudoun United FC signed Presley ahead of their 2019 inaugural season.

In January 2020, Presley joined USL League One expansion side New England Revolution II ahead of the 2020 season.
