= BMO Training Ground =

Training facility of Toronto FC

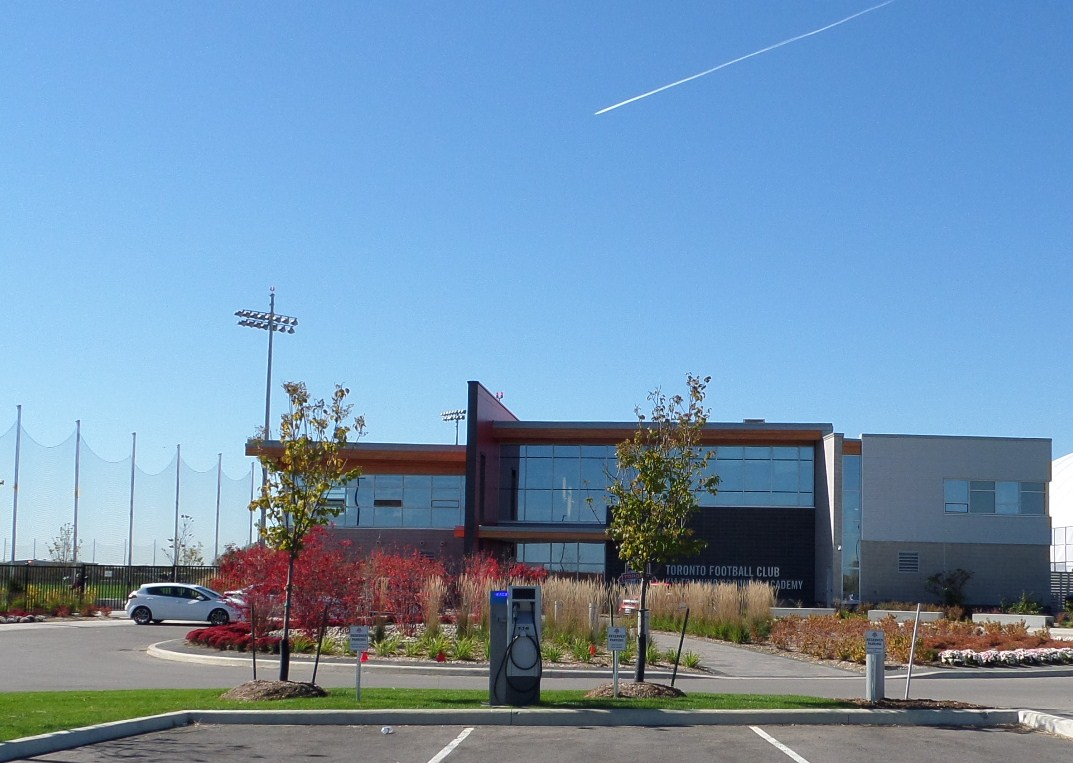
- Former names: KIA Training Ground (2012-2018)
- Address: 85 Carl Hall Road
- Location: Toronto, Ontario, Canada
- Owner: Maple Leaf Sports & Entertainment
- Capacity: 1000
- Field size: 14 acres (57,000 m^{2})

Construction
- Opened: June 2012
- Cost: $21 million

Tenants
- Toronto FC (Major League Soccer); Toronto FC II (MLS Next Pro); TFC Academy (MLS Next)

BMO Training Ground is the practice facility of Toronto FC of Major League Soccer (MLS) and its minor league reserve team Toronto FC II of MLS Next Pro, and the home of the TFC Academy of MLS Next. The facility, which opened in 2012 and features a stadium with 1000 seats, is located at Downsview Park, in Toronto, Ontario, Canada.

== History ==
In March 2011, Downsview Park was selected as the site of Toronto FC's new state-of-the-art Academy and Training Facility. Construction began in May 2011, and the facility opened in June 2012. Spanning 14 acres, it includes three grass fields, one domed turf field for year round use, a 1000 seat stadium, and a field house. The first team facilities include a dressing room, hot tub, ice bath, rehabilitation pool, physiotherapy room, private dining, as well as seven dressing rooms for the Academy teams, and a kitchen, cafeteria, media room, classroom and offices for coaching staff. Maple Leaf Sports & Entertainment (MLSE), owner of Toronto FC, spent more than $21 million building the facility and pays rent for the land on a 20-year lease, with an aim to becoming the epicentre of soccer development in Canada. The facility was originally known as KIA Training Ground, due to a naming rights deal with Kia.

In July 2014 it was announced that MLSE would expand the training grounds at a cost of $2 million to house a practice facility for the Toronto Argonauts of the Canadian Football League, which would rent the facility from MLSE and practice on a nearby city owned field. The team moved in that September, but later moved their practice facility to Lamport Stadium in 2018.

In 2018, the Bank of Montreal acquired the naming rights to the training ground, renaming it to the BMO Training Ground & Academy.

With their drop to the division 3 USL League One for the 2019 season, Toronto FC II moved their home games to BMO Training Ground. On April 4, 2022, after the team left USL League One to join the newly formed MLS Next Pro, Toronto FC II announced that York Lions Stadium would serve as their new home stadium.

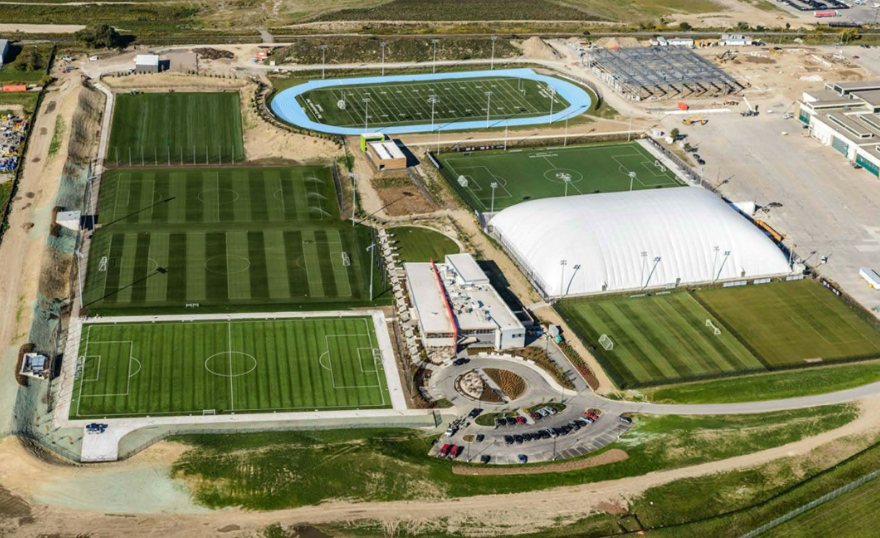

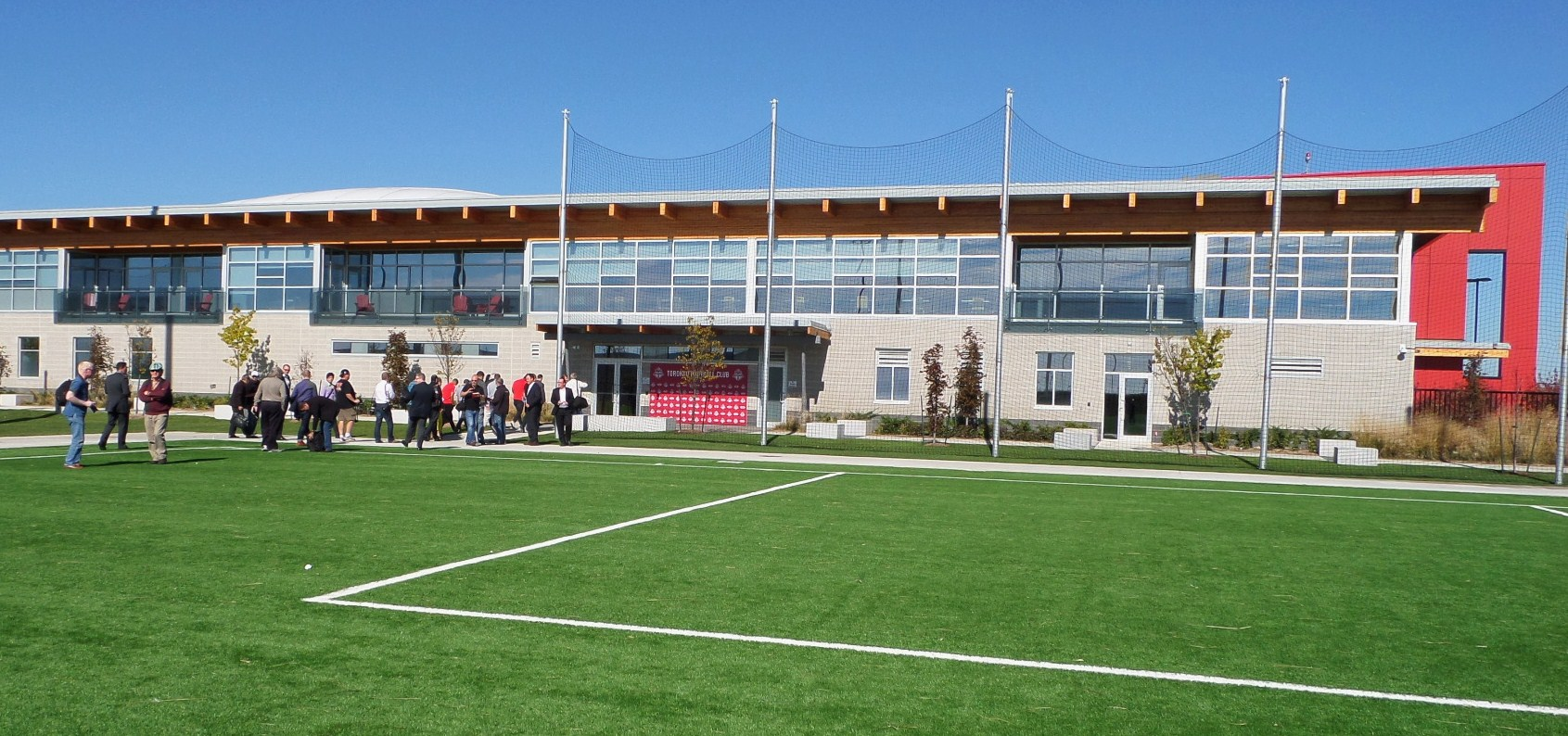

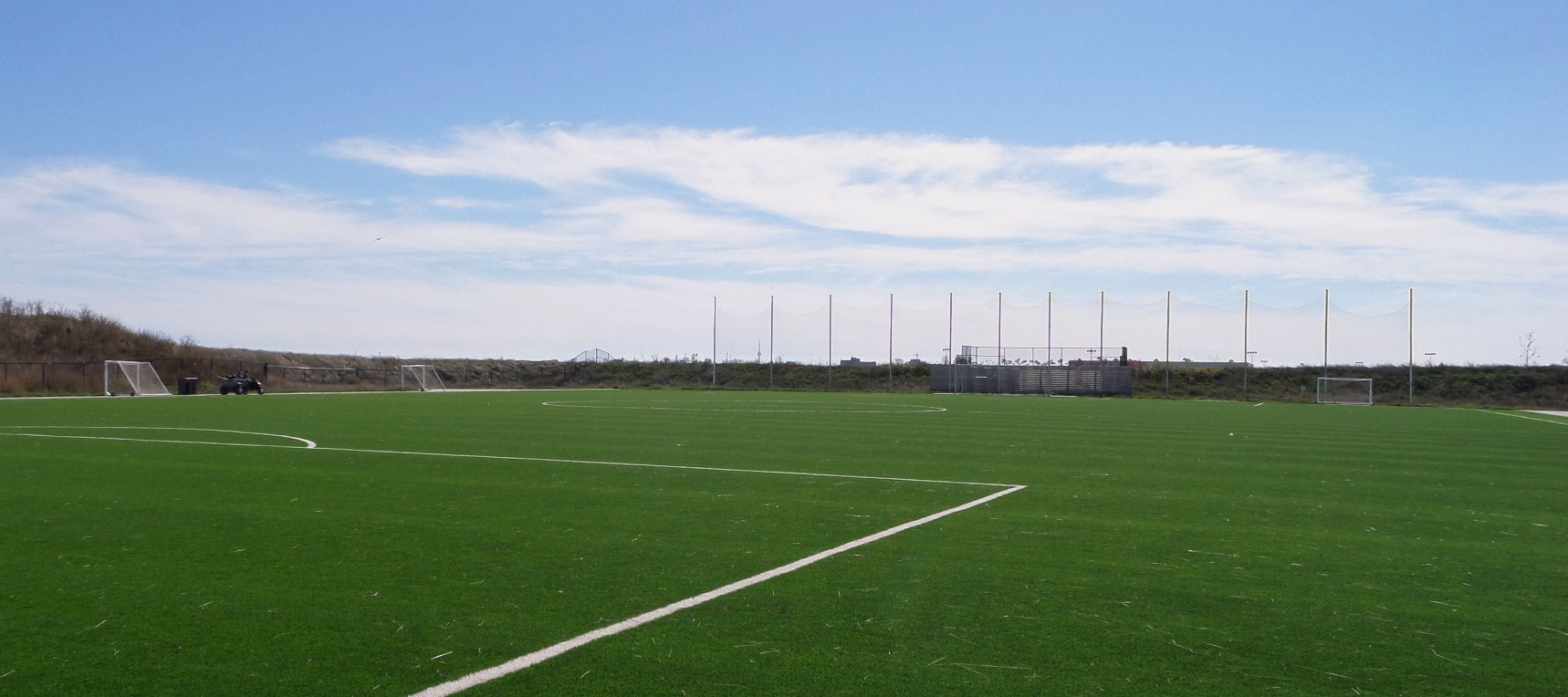
