= Hikaru Fujiwara =

Japanese footballer

Hikaru Fujiwara 藤原 光
Personal information
- Full name: Hikaru Fujiwara
- Date of birth: September 10, 2003 (age 23)
- Place of birth: Obu, Aichi, Japan
- Height: 5 ft 8 in (1.73 m)
- Position: Midfielder

Youth career
- 2016–2022: New England Revolution

Senior career*
Years	Team	Apps	(Gls)
2020–2022	New England Revolution II	45	(0)
- * Club domestic league appearances and goals as of 19 September 2022

Hikaru Fujiwara (藤原 光, Fujiwara Hikaru; born 10 September 2003) is a Japanese professional footballer who plays as a midfielder for MLS Next Pro club New England Revolution II via the New England Revolution academy.

== Career ==
=== Youth ===
Fujiwara joined the New England Revolution academy in 2016. He made his first appearance for the club's USL League One side, New England Revolution II, on 15 August 2020, appearing as a 60th-minute substitute during a 3-3 draw with North Texas SC. In his debut, Fujiwara became the first Revolution Academy player to record a professional assist. He earned his first professional start on 21 August 2020 against Richmond Kickers. Following the 2022 season, his option was declined by New England.

== Personal ==
Fujiwara was born in Obu, Aichi, Japan before moving to Lexington, Massachusetts in the United States when he was 12 years old. His brother, Kaoru, also plays in the New England Revolution academy.
