= Maciel (footballer, born 2000) =

Brazilian footballer

Personal information
- Full name: Lucas Maciel Felix
- Date of birth: 18 January 2000 (age 26)
- Place of birth: Rio de Janeiro, Brazil
- Height: 1.70 m (5 ft 7 in)
- Position: Midfielder

Team information
- Current team: Stal Kraśnik
- Number: 13

Youth career
- 2009–2020: Botafogo

Senior career*
Years	Team	Apps	(Gls)
2020–2024	New England Revolution II	45	(1)
2021–2022	New England Revolution	35	(0)
2025	Amazonas		
2026–	Stal Kraśnik	8	(0)
- * Club domestic league appearances and goals as of 21:49, 3 June 2026 (UTC)

Lucas Maciel Felix (born 18 January 2000) is a Brazilian professional footballer who plays as a midfielder for Polish IV liga Lublin club Stal Kraśnik.

== Career ==
=== Youth ===
Maciel spent ten years with the Botafogo academy. He appeared for Botafogo's under-20 side and in the 2019 under-20 Campeonato Brasileiro.

=== New England Revolution II ===
On 16 January 2020, Maciel joined USL League One side New England Revolution II ahead of their 2020 season. He made his professional debut on 25 July 2020, starting against Union Omaha.

After having his option declined by the first team at the end of the 2023 season, he re-signed with New England Revolution II on 5 January 2024.

=== New England Revolution ===
On 22 March 2021, Maciel signed a first-team contract with New England Revolution. He made his debut on 3 May 2021, starting against Atlanta United.

== Career statistics ==
As of match played 13 May 2026

Appearances and goals by club, season and competition
Club	Season	League			National cup (Note: Includes U.S. Open Cup)		Continental		Other		Total	
Club	Season	Division	Apps	Goals	Apps	Goals	Apps	Goals	Apps	Goals	Apps	Goals
New England Revolution II	2020	USL League One	16	0	—		—		—		16	0
New England Revolution II	2021	USL League One	4	0	—		—		—		4	0
New England Revolution II	2023	MLS Next Pro	1	0	—		—		2 (Note: Appearances in MLS Next Pro playoffs)	0	3	0
New England Revolution II	2024	MLS Next Pro	24	1	—		—		—		24	1
New England Revolution II	Total		45	1	—		—		2	0	47	1
New England Revolution	2021	Major League Soccer	19	0	—		—		1 (Note: Appearances in MLS Cup playoffs)	0	20	0
New England Revolution	2022	Major League Soccer	16	0	2	0	0	0	—		18	0
New England Revolution	Total		35	0	2	0	0	0	1	0	38	0
Stal Kraśnik	2025–26	III liga, group IV	8	0	—		—		—		8	0
Career total			88	0	2	0	0	0	3	0	93	1

== Honours ==
New England Revolution

- Supporters' Shield: 2021
