= Noel Buck =

American-English footballer (born 2005)

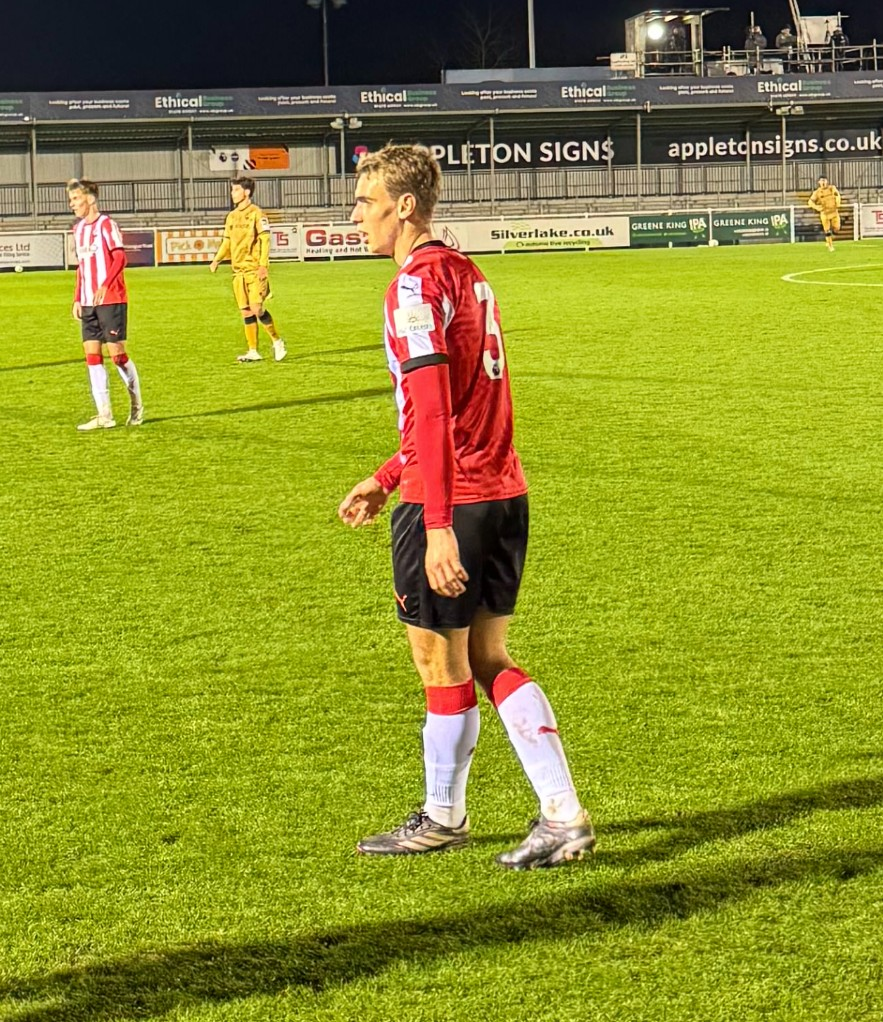

Personal information
- Full name: Noel Arthur Coleman Buck
- Date of birth: April 5, 2005 (age 21)
- Place of birth: Arlington, Massachusetts, United States
- Height: 5 ft 11 in (1.80 m)
- Position: Midfielder

Team information
- Current team: San Jose Earthquakes
- Number: 21

Youth career
- –2016: New England FC
- 2017–2021: New England Revolution

Senior career*
Years	Team	Apps	(Gls)
2021–2022	New England Revolution II	46	(6)
2022–2025	New England Revolution	47	(5)
2024–2025	→ Southampton (loan)	0	(0)
2025–	San Jose Earthquakes	10	(0)
2025–	San Jose Earthquakes II	8	(1)

International career^{‡}
2023	England U19	8	(1)
2024	England U20	2	(0)
- * Club domestic league appearances and goals as of 06:44, November 17, 2026 (UTC) ‡ National team caps and goals as of 08:36, June 14, 2024 (UTC)

Noel Arthur Coleman Buck (born April 5, 2005) is a professional footballer who plays as a midfielder for Major League Soccer club San Jose Earthquakes. Born in the United States, he represented England at youth level.

== Club career ==
=== Youth ===
Raised in Arlington, Massachusetts, Buck joined the New England Revolution academy in 2017 from New England Futbol Club. In 2021, Buck spent time with the club's USL League One affiliate team New England Revolution II. He made his debut on April 10, 2021, starting against Fort Lauderdale CF.

=== Professional ===
On January 18, 2022, Buck signed a homegrown player contract with New England Revolution.

He scored his first goal at the MLS level on September 4, 2022, in a 3–0 win over New York City FC, making him the second youngest scorer in team history, behind only Diego Fagúndez. On March 25, 2023, Buck scored an 88th minute game-winning goal against D.C. United at Audi Field, assisted by Gustavo Bou.

On August 30, 2024, Buck joined Premier League side Southampton on a short-term loan until January and joined the Under-21 squad. Buck returned to the Revolution on January 6, 2025.

On April 23, 2025, Buck was traded to San Jose Earthquakes for a fee of up to $650,000.

== International career ==
Born in the United States to an English father and an American mother, Buck is eligible to represent England, the United States, and Wales (through his Welsh grandmother) in international competitions.

In September 2023, Buck earned his first call-up to the England U19 squad.

He went on to make his U19 debut during a 1–0 defeat to Germany in Oliva on September 6, 2023.

On June 7, 2024, Buck made his England U20 debut during a 2–1 win over Sweden at Stadion ŠRC Sesvete.

== Personal life ==
Buck holds American and British passports.

== Career statistics ==
=== Club ===
As of match played September 10, 2026

Appearances and goals by club, season and competition
Club	Season	League			National cup		Continental		Other		Total	
Club	Season	Division	Apps	Goals	Apps	Goals	Apps	Goals	Apps	Goals	Apps	Goals
New England Revolution II	2021	USL League One	28	5	—		—		—		28	5
New England Revolution II	2022	MLS Next Pro	16	1	—		—		—		16	1
New England Revolution II	2025	MLS Next Pro	2	0	—		—		—		2	0
New England Revolution II	Total		46	6	—		—		—		46	6
New England Revolution	2022	MLS	7	1	—		—		—		7	1
New England Revolution	2023	MLS	25	3	1	0	—		6 (Note: Four appearances in Leagues Cup, two appearances in MLS Cup Playoffs)	0	32	3
New England Revolution	2024	MLS	13	1	—		5 (Note: Appearances in CONCACAF Champions Cup)	0	—		18	1
New England Revolution	2025	MLS	2	0	0	0	—		—		2	0
New England Revolution	Total		47	5	1	0	5	0	6	0	59	5
Southampton (loan)	2024–25	Premier League	0	0	0	0	—		0	0	0	0
San Jose Earthquakes II	2025	MLS Next Pro	2	0	—		—		—		2	0
San Jose Earthquakes II	2026	MLS Next Pro	6	1	—		—		—		6	1
San Jose Earthquakes II	Total		8	1	—		—		—		8	1
San Jose Earthquakes	2025	MLS	9	0	1	0	—		—		10	0
San Jose Earthquakes	2026	MLS	1	0	1	0	—		—		2	0
San Jose Earthquakes	Total		10	0	2	0	—		—		12	0
Career total			111	12	3	0	5	0	6	0	125	12
