= Marcelo Santos =

Brazilian footballer (born 1994)

Personal information
- Full name: Marcelo Machado dos Santos
- Date of birth: 29 May 1994 (age 32)
- Place of birth: Santo Amaro, Brazil
- Height: 1.81 m (5 ft 11 in)
- Position: Midfielder

Team information
- Current team: Operário Ferroviário

Youth career
- Vitória

Senior career*
Years	Team	Apps	(Gls)
2013–2016	Vitória	66	(5)
2017–2019	Maccabi Tel Aviv	5	(0)
2017–2018	→ Bnei Yehuda (loan)	2	(0)
2018–2019	→ Botafogo (loan)	13	(0)
2019–2020	Desportivo Aves	0	(0)
2019–2020	→ Guarani (loan)	34	(1)
2021	Guarani	1	(0)
2021–	Operário Ferroviário	0	(0)
- * Club domestic league appearances and goals as of 22:34 4 April 2019 (UTC)

Marcelo Machado dos Santos (born 29 May 1994) is a Brazilian footballer who plays as a midfielder for Operário Ferroviário.

== Career statistics ==
As of 4 April 2019

Club	Season	League			Cup		Continental		Other		Total	
Club	Season	Division	Apps	Goals	Apps	Goals	Apps	Goals	Apps	Goals	Apps	Goals
Vitória	2013	Série A	8	0	0	0	–		0	0	8	0
Vitória	2014	Série A	3	0	2 (Note: One appearance in the Copa do Nordeste, one appearance in the Copa do Brasil)	0	1 (Note: Appearances in the Copa Sudamericana)	0	5 (Note: Appearances in the Campeonato Baiano)	0	11	0
Vitória	2015	Série B	10	0	4 (Note: One appearance in the Copa do Nordeste, three appearances in the Copa do Brasil)	0	–		0	0	14	0
Vitória	2016	Série A	22	3	5 (Note: Appearances in the Copa do Brasil)	1	2	0	4	1	33	5
Vitória	Total		43	3	11	1	3	0	9	1	66	5
Maccabi Tel Aviv	2016–17	Ligat Winner	3	0	2 (Note: Appearances in the Israel State Cup)	0	–		0	0	4	0
Maccabi Tel Aviv	2017–18	Ligat Winner	0	0	3 (Note: Appearances in the Toto Cup Al)	0	0	0	0	0	3	0
Maccabi Tel Aviv	2018–19	Ligat Winner	0	0	0	0	0	0	0	0	0	0
Maccabi Tel Aviv	Total		3	0	5	0	0	0	0	0	8	0
Bnei Yehuda (loan)	2017–18	Ligat Winner	2	0	1	0	–		0	0	3	0
Botafogo (loan)	2018	Série A	4	0	0	0	2	0	7 (Note: Appearances in the Campeonato Carioca)	0	13	0
Career total			52	3	17	1	5	0	16	1	90	5
