= Pierre Cayet =

French footballer (born 1999)

Personal information
- Date of birth: July 7, 1999 (age 27)
- Place of birth: Le Mans, France
- Height: 1.83 m (6 ft 0 in)
- Position: Defender

Youth career
- 2014–2018: Angers

College career
| Years | Team | Apps | (Gls) |
| 2018–2020 | Temple Owls | 47 | (5) |

Senior career*
| Years | Team | Apps | (Gls) |
| 2017–2018 | Angers II | 11 | (0) |
| 2019 | Long Island Rough Riders | 6 | (0) |
| 2021–2023 | New England Revolution II | 73 | (6) |
| 2024 | Pittsburgh Riverhounds | 17 | (0) |
- * Club domestic league appearances and goals as of 14:17, 11 November 2024 (UTC)

Pierre Cayet (born 7 July 1999) is a French professional footballer who plays as a defender.

== Career ==
=== Youth ===
Cayet played with the Angers SCO academy. Here he went on to play 11 games for the team's Championnat National 3 reserve side.

=== College and amateur ===
In 2018, Cayet opted to move to the United States to play college soccer at Temple University. Cayet played three seasons with the Owls, including a truncated 2020 season due to the COVID-19 pandemic, making 47 appearances, scoring 5 goals and tallying 2 assists. In 2018 he was named the team's Defensive MVP and in 2019, Cayet earned Second Team All-AAC and Third Team All-Region honors. In 2020, Cayet again earned All-AAC First Team honors.

During the 2019 season, Cayet also appeared for USL League Two side Long Island Rough Riders. He made 6 appearances for the team.

=== Professional ===
On 28 April 2021, Cayet signed with USL League One side New England Revolution II. He debuted for the club on 16 May 2021, starting in a 2–2 draw with Chattanooga Red Wolves.

Cayet joined USL Championship club Pittsburgh Riverhounds on January 19, 2024. He became a free agent following Pittsburgh's 2024 season.
