= Damian Rivera =

Guatemalan footballer (born 2002)

Personal information
- Full name: Damian Esau Rivera
- Date of birth: 8 December 2002 (age 23)
- Place of birth: Cranston, Rhode Island, United States
- Height: 1.78 m (5 ft 10 in)
- Position: Midfielder

Team information
- Current team: Phoenix Rising
- Number: 19

Youth career
- 2016–2019: New England Revolution

Senior career*
Years	Team	Apps	(Gls)
2019–2024	New England Revolution	17	(1)
2020–2023	New England Revolution II	52	(16)
2024	→ Tampa Bay Rowdies (loan)	34	(6)
2025–	Phoenix Rising	26	(2)

International career^{‡}
2019	United States U17	2	(0)
2023	Costa Rica U23	3	(0)
2026–	Guatemala (B)	1	(0)
- * Club domestic league appearances and goals as of 18:53, 10 November 2026 (UTC) ‡ National team caps and goals as of 18:50, 19 January 2026 (UTC)

Damian Esau Rivera (born 8 December 2002) is a professional footballer who plays as a midfielder for USL Championship club Phoenix Rising. Born in the United States, and a former youth international for the United States and Costa Rica, he plays for the Guatemala national team.

== Club career ==
=== New England Revolution ===
In November 2019, Rivera signed a homegrown contract with the Revolution. He made his professional debut with New England's USL League One affiliate on 7 August 2020 against Orlando City B. In October of that season, Rivera scored his first professional goal, netting in the 83rd minute of a 4–0 victory over the Richmond Kickers. He would finish his inaugural season with the club with two goals and an assist in 14 league appearances.

On 30 April 2022, Rivera made his first MLS start, and subsequently scored his first MLS goal, in the Revolution's 2–0 win over Inter Miami CF. In the process he became only the third player in league history to score in the first minute of his first MLS start, and the first to do so since Real Salt Lake's Matias Mantilla on 29 August 2007.

=== Phoenix Rising FC ===
Rivera signed a multi-year contract with Phoenix Rising FC on December 11, 2024.

== International career ==
=== Youth ===
Born in the United States, Rivera is of Costa Rican and Guatemalan descent. He is a youth international for the United States, having represented the United States under-17s. He was called up to play for the Costa Rica under-23s at the 2023 Maurice Revello Tournament.

=== Senior ===
On 2 April 2025, his request to switch international allegiance to Guatemala was approved by FIFA. On 5 June 2025, he received his first call-up for Guatemala when he was called up to represent the country in the 2025 CONCACAF Gold Cup, but did not make an appearance. On January 18, 2026, he made his first appearance for Guatemala in a friendly against Canada, although as it was classified as a B-level friendly, it did not count as an official senior cap.

== Honours ==
New England Revolution

- Supporters' Shield: 2021
