= Ryan Spaulding =

American soccer player (born 1998)

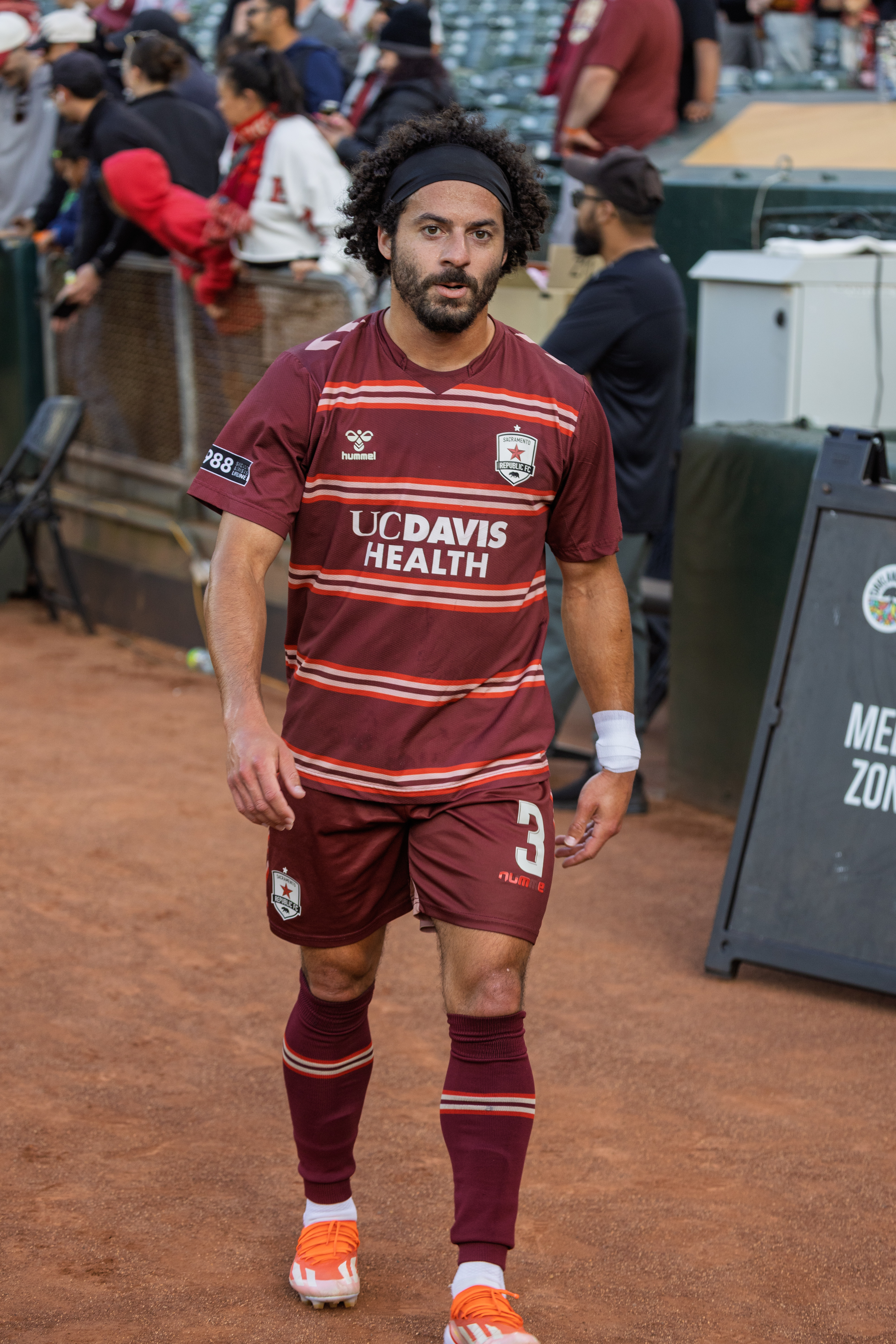
- Spaulding with the Sacramento Republic in 2026

Personal information
- Full name: Ryan Louis Spaulding
- Date of birth: September 10, 1998 (age 28)
- Place of birth: Hartford, Connecticut, United States
- Height: 5 ft 8 in (1.73 m)
- Positions: Defender; midfielder

Team information
- Current team: Sacramento Republic
- Number: 3

Youth career
- North Carolina FC Youth

College career
Years	Team	Apps	(Gls)
2016–2017	Charlotte 49ers	32	(3)

Senior career*
Years	Team	Apps	(Gls)
2017	North Carolina FC U23	11	(5)
2018–2019	Stade Briochin	9	(0)
2019	North Carolina FC	0	(0)
2020–2022	New England Revolution II	53	(4)
2022–2024	New England Revolution	27	(0)
2023	→ Tampa Bay Rowdies (loan)	9	(2)
2024	→ Tampa Bay Rowdies (loan)	4	(0)
2025–	Sacramento Republic	39	(0)
- * Club domestic league appearances and goals as of November 11, 2026

Ryan Louis Spaulding (born September 10, 1998) is an American professional soccer player who plays as a defender for USL Championship club Sacramento Republic FC.

== Background ==
Spaulding was born in Hartford, Connecticut. He attended Panther Creek High School in Cary. Spaulding played for the North Carolina FC Youth Academy.

Spaulding played two seasons of soccer at UNC Charlotte, appearing in 32 games and scoring three goals and two assists.

== Career ==
=== North Carolina FC U23 ===
Spaulding played the 2017 USL Premier Development League season with North Carolina FC U23, leading the team in scoring with 5 goals.

=== Stade Briochin ===
In January 2018, Spaudling joined Stade Briochin of France's Championnat National 2. He played nine games with the team.

=== North Carolina FC ===
On September 20, 2019, Spaulding was signed by North Carolina FC of the USL Championship.

=== New England Revolution II ===
On January 16, 2020, Spaulding was announced as part of the inaugural roster for New England Revolution II of USL League One.

=== New England Revolution ===
On February 18, 2022, Spaulding was signed to New England Revolution's MLS roster.

On April 21, 2023, Spaulding joined the Tampa Bay Rowdies on a loan from the remainder of the 2023 USL Championship season. He was recalled by New England on June 20, 2023.

In August 2024, Spaulding returned to Tampa Bay Rowdies on loan for the remainder of the 2024 season.

=== Sacramento Republic FC ===
Spaulding joined USL Championship side Sacramento Republic on January 7, 2025.
