= 2026 New England Revolution season =

New England Revolution 2026 soccer season

New England Revolution
2026 season
- President: Brian Bilello
- Head coach: Marko Mitrović
- Stadium: Gillette Stadium
- MLS: Conference: TBD; Overall: TBD
- MLS Cup playoffs: Qualified
- U.S. Open Cup: Round of 16
| Home colors | Away colors | Third colors |

The 2026 New England Revolution season is the club's 31st season in existence, and their 31st consecutive season playing in Major League Soccer, the top flight of American soccer. On November 7, 2025, the Revs appointed Marko Mitrović as the new head coach.

The season began on February 21 against Nashville SC. The Revolution also played in the 2026 U.S. Open Cup, but did not qualify for the 2026 Leagues Cup.

== Background ==
The 2025 season was the Revolution's 30th season of existence, and their 30th season in MLS, the top tier of American soccer. The season began on February 22 against Nashville SC. The Revolution also played in the 2025 U.S. Open Cup. Head Coach Caleb Porter was dismissed with 4 games left in the season, with assistant Pablo Moreira taking over on an interim basis.

On December 31, 2025, the Kraft Group announced formal agreements with the cities of Everett and Boston to construct a soccer-specific stadium for the New England Revolution on the site of a decommissioned power plant along the Mystic River.

== Club ==
=== Roster ===
Appearances and goals are career totals from prior MLS regular seasons.

| Squad No. | Name | Nationality | Position(s) | Date of birth (age) | Signed from | Games Played | Goals Scored |
Goalkeepers
| 30 | Matt Turner | (United States) | GK | December 29, 1994 (aged 31) | (United States) Olympique Lyonnais | 112 | 0 |
| 33 | Donovan Parisian | (United States) (Armenia) | GK | September 27, 2004 (aged 21) | (United States) University of San Diego | 0 | 0 |
| 73 | John David Gunn | (Panama) | GK | January 21, 2000 (aged 26) | (United States) New England Revolution II | 0 | 0 |
Defenders
| 2 | Mamadou Fofana | (Mali) | DF | January 21, 1998 (aged 28) | (France) Amiens SC | 30 | 0 |
| 3 | Brayan Ceballos | (Colombia) | DF | May 24, 2001 (aged 24) | (Brazil) Fortaleza Esporte Clube | 29 | 1 |
| 4 | Tanner Beason | (United States) | DF | March 23, 1997 (aged 28) | (United States) San Jose Earthquakes | 137 | 0 |
| 5 | Keegan Hughes | (United States) | DF | July 22, 2000 (aged 25) | (United States) New England Revolution II | 8 | 0 |
| 12 | Ilay Feingold | (Israel) (Romania) | DF | August 23, 2004 (aged 21) | (Israel) Maccabi Haifa F.C. | 29 | 3 |
| 22 | Ethan Kohler | (Indonesia) | DF | May 20, 2005 (aged 20) | (Germany) SV Werder Bremen | 0 | 0 |
| 23 | Will Sands | (United States) | DF | July 6, 2000 (aged 25) | (United States) Columbus Crew | 49 | 0 |
| 25 | Peyton Miller | (United States) | DF | November 8, 2007 (aged 18) | (United States) New England Revolution II | 36 | 2 |
| 30 | Damario McIntosh | (United States) (Jamaica) | DF | August 17, 2007 (aged 18) | (United States) New England Revolution II | 0 | 0 |
| 88 | Andrew Farrell | (United States) | DF | April 2, 1992 (aged 33) | (United States) University of Louisville | 344 | 2 |
Midfielders
| 7 | Griffin Yow | (United States) | MF | September 25, 2002 (aged 23) | (Belgium) KVC Westerlo | 32 | 3 |
| 8 | Matt Polster | (United States) | MF | June 8, 1993 (aged 32) | (Scotland) Rangers F.C. | 243 | 10 |
| 10 | Carles Gil | (Spain) | MF | November 22, 1992 (aged 33) | (Spain) Deportivo de La Coruña | 193 | 49 |
| 14 | Jackson Yueill | (United States) | MF | March 19, 1997 (aged 28) | (United States) San Jose Earthquakes | 224 | 13 |
| 18 | Allan Oyirwoth | (Uganda) | MF | January 23, 2007 (aged 19) | (Uganda) MYDA FC | 5 | 0 |
| 21 | Brooklyn Raines | (United States) (Liberia) | MF | March 11, 2005 (aged 20) | (United States) Houston Dynamo FC | 45 | 0 |
| 22 | Jack Panayotou | (United States) (Cyprus) | MF | June 5, 2004 (aged 21) | (United States) Georgetown University | 17 | 0 |
| 35 | Cristiano Oliveira | (United States) (Brazil) | MF | March 30, 2008 (aged 17) | (United States) New England Revolution II | 0 | 0 |
| 38 | Eric Klein | (United States) | MF | November 20, 2006 (aged 19) | (United States) New England Revolution II | 2 | 0 |
| 77 | Diego Fagundez | (Uruguay) (United States) | MF | February 14, 1995 (aged 31) | (United States) Los Angeles Galaxy | 424 | 79 |
| 80 | Alhassan Yusuf | (Nigeria) | MF | July 20, 2000 (aged 25) | (Belgium) Royal Antwerp F.C. | 41 | 2 |
Forwards
| 9 | Leonardo Campana | (Ecuador) (United States) | FW | July 24, 2000 (aged 25) | (United States) Inter Miami CF | 104 | 35 |
| 32 | Malcolm Fry | (United States) | FW | May 15, 2005 (aged 20) | (United States) New England Revolution II | 2 | 0 |
| 41 | Luca Langoni | (Argentina) | FW | February 9, 2002 (aged 24) | (Argentina) Boca Juniors | 38 | 5 |

== Non-competitive ==
In December, the Revolution announced a series of five preseason games, with three being held at the IMG Academy in Bradenton, Florida.

=== Preseason exhibitions ===
| January 17 | New England Revolution | 6–0 | Sarasota Paradise | Bradenton, Florida |
| 12:00 pm EST | Beason 16'; Campana 35'; Yueill 39'; Turgeman 65'; Cristiano Oliveira 87'; Klein 90' | Report | | Stadium: IMG Academy |

| January 23 | New England Revolution | 1–1 | FC Cincinnati | Bradenton, Florida |
| 12:00 pm EST | Campana 85' | Report | Denkey 53' | Stadium: IMG Academy |

| January 31 | Houston Dynamo | 3–2 | New England Revolution | Tampa, Florida |
| 1:00 pm EST | Herrera 10'; Markanich (penalty scored) 64', 114' | Report | Campana 45'; Yow 53' | Stadium: Al Lang Stadium |

| February 7 | New England Revolution | 1–2 | CF Montréal | Bradenton, Florida |
| 4:00 pm EST | Fry 103' | Report | Owusu 24' Þórhallsson 32' | Stadium: IMG Academy |

| February 14 | New England Revolution | 6–1 | Hartford Athletic | Foxborough, Massachusetts |
| 1:00 pm EST | Campana 21', 28'; Gil (penalty scored) 48'; Klein 106'; Yusuf 109'; Oyirwoth 111' | Report | (penalty scored) 68' | Stadium: Gillette Stadium |

== Competitive ==
=== Major League Soccer ===
==== Results ====
| February 21 1 | Nashville SC | 4–1 | New England Revolution | Nashville, Tennessee |
| 8:30 PM EST | Surridge 6', 16'; Mukhtar 39'; Madrigal 49' | Report | Campana 47'; Yow (yellow card) 48' | Stadium: Geodis Park; Attendance: 25,044; Referee: Tori Penso |

| February 28 2 | New York Red Bulls | 1–0 | New England Revolution | Harrison, New Jersey |
| 2:30 PM EST | Donkor (yellow card) 21'; Hall 53'; Nealis (yellow card) 86' | Report | Yow (yellow card) 14'; Turgeman (yellow card) 39'; Raines (yellow card) 75'; Gil (yellow card) 78' | Stadium: Sports Illustrated Stadium; Attendance: 15,087; Referee: Ricardo Montero |

| March 15 3 | New England Revolution | 6–1 | FC Cincinnati | Foxborough, Massachusetts |
| 2:30 PM EDT | Langoni (yellow card) 16'; Ceballos 25', 45+3', (yellow card) 28'; Turgeman 31'; Yusuf 53'; Polster (yellow card) 60'; Yow 87'; Miller 89' | Report | Valenzuela 19', (red card) 69'; Ramírez (yellow card) 24'; Jabbari (yellow card) 38' | Stadium: Gillette Stadium; Attendance: 15,627; Referee: Lorenzo Hernandez |

| March 21 4 | St. Louis City SC | 3–1 | New England Revolution | St. Louis, Missouri |
| 8:30 PM EDT | Becher 29'; Santos (yellow card) 38'; Durkin 45+3'; Hartel 83'; Orozco (yellow card) 88'; Bürki (yellow card) 90+10' | Report | Feingold 14'; Ceballos (yellow card) 52'; Fofana (yellow card) 66' | Stadium: Energizer Park; Attendance: 22,423; Referee: Sergii Boiko |

| April 4 5 | New England Revolution | 3–0 | CF Montréal | Foxborough, Massachusetts |
| 4:30 PM EDT | Langoni 6'; Raines (yellow card) 27'; Sands (yellow card) 33'; Fofana 77'; Miller 90+4' | Report | Synchuk (yellow card) 53'; Carmona (yellow card) 65'; Craig (yellow card) 69' | Stadium: Gillette Stadium; Attendance: 19,461; Referee: Joshua Encarnación |

| April 11 6 | New England Revolution | 1–0 | D.C. United | Foxborough, Massachusetts |
| 7:30 PM EDT | Yusuf 35' | Report | | Stadium: Gillette Stadium; Attendance: 15,454; Referee: Jon Freemon |

| April 18 7 | New England Revolution | 2–1 | Columbus Crew | Foxborough, Massachusetts |
| 7:30 PM EDT | Turgeman 54'; Turner (yellow card) 71'; Gil 85' (pen.) | Report | Arfsten 25', (yellow card) 87'; Gomes (yellow card) 70'; Camacho (yellow card) 90+6' | Stadium: Gillette Stadium; Attendance: 16,257; Referee: Timothy Ford |

| April 22 8 | Atlanta United FC | 1–2 | New England Revolution | Atlanta, Georgia |
| 7:30 PM EDT | Picault 38'; Galarza (yellow card) 44'; Edwards (yellow card) 47' | Report | Sands 73'; Miller 78'; Raines (yellow card) 87'; Feingold (yellow card) 90+2' | Stadium: Mercedes-Benz Stadium; Attendance: 30,306; Referee: Ricardo Montero |

| April 25 9 | Inter Miami CF | 1–1 | New England Revolution | Miami, Florida |
| 7:30 PM EDT | Allende (yellow card) 59'; Ruíz (yellow card) 67'; Berterame 76'; Micael (yellow card) 90+2' | Report | Gil 56' | Stadium: Nu Stadium; Attendance: 26,609; Referee: Rubiel Vazquez |

| May 2 10 | New England Revolution | 1–0 | Charlotte FC | Foxborough, Massachusetts |
| 7:30 PM EDT | Sands (yellow card) 51'; Fofana (yellow card) 60'; Gil 90+7' (pen.), (yellow card) 90+8' | Report | Byrne (yellow card) 30'; Schnegg (yellow card) 57'; Zaha (yellow card) 60'; Westwood (yellow card) 82' | Stadium: Gillette Stadium; Attendance: 22,831; Referee: Pierre-Luc Lauziere |

| May 9 11 | New England Revolution | 2–1 | Philadelphia Union | Foxborough, Massachusetts |
| 7:30 PM EDT | Langoni 61'; Gil 87' | Report | Lukić (yellow card) 34'; Sands 37' (o.g.); Vassilev (yellow card) 45+2'; Anello (yellow card) 85' | Stadium: Gillette Stadium; Attendance: 18,561; Referee: Tori Penso |

| May 13 12 | New England Revolution | 0–3 | Nashville SC | Foxborough, Massachusetts |
| 7:30 PM EDT | Raines (yellow card) 56'; Yusuf (yellow card) 90' | Report | Nájar (yellow card) 23'; Acosta 34', 74'; Corcoran (yellow card) 40'; Madrigal 41'; Lovitz (yellow card) 83' | Stadium: Gillette Stadium; Attendance: 14,287; Referee: Sergii Demianchuk |

| May 16 13 | New England Revolution | 2–1 | Minnesota United FC | Foxborough, Massachusetts |
| 7:30 PM EDT | Gil 5' (pen.); Langoni 49'; Raines (yellow card) 70'; Yow (yellow card) 90+3' | Report | Yeboah 26' (pen.); Romero (yellow card) 71' | Stadium: Gillette Stadium; Attendance: 26,385; Referee: Rosendo Mendoza |

| May 23 14 | Charlotte FC | 1–0 | New England Revolution | Charlotte, North Carolina |
| 7:30 PM EDT | Schnegg (yellow card) 13' (yellow-red card) 58'; Toklomati 16' | Report | Miller (yellow card) 27'; Fofana (yellow card) 62'; Kohler (yellow card) 65'; Ceballos (yellow card) 68' | Stadium: Bank of America Stadium; Attendance: 24,640; Referee: Fotis Bazakos |

Mid-season break for 2026 FIFA World Cup

| July 22 15 | New England Revolution | 0–0 | Toronto FC | Foxborough, Massachusetts |
| 7:30 PM EDT | Polster (yellow card) 56'; Raines (yellow card) 90+3' | Report | | Stadium: Gillette Stadium; Attendance: 17,249; Referee: Sergii Demianchuk |

| July 25 16 | New England Revolution | 4–1 | Atlanta United FC | Foxborough, Massachusetts |
| 7:30 PM EDT | Gil 11'; Yusuf (yellow card) 20'; Turgeman 36'; Miller 56'; Raines 67'; Harris (yellow card) 70' | Report | Edwards (yellow card) 31'; Reilly (yellow card) 52'; Almirón 85' | Stadium: Gillette Stadium; Attendance: 34,428; Referee: Pierre-Luc Lauziere |

| August 1 17 | CF Montréal | 2–2 | New England Revolution | Montreal, Quebec |
| 7:30 PM EDT | Breza (yellow card) 36'; Vera 52'; Owusu 59' | Report | Gil 30' (pen.); Turgeman 36' | Stadium: Saputo Stadium; Attendance: 15,082; Referee: Jair Marrufo |

| August 8 18 | New England Revolution | 0–2 | Houston Dynamo FC | Foxborough, Massachusetts |
| 4:30 PM EDT | | Report | Guilherme 45+2'; Ennali (yellow card) 54'; Resch 63' | Stadium: Gillette Stadium; Attendance: 22,038; Referee: Malik Badawi |
Note: Match was originally scheduled for March 7 but postponed due to inclement weather.

| August 15 19 | Toronto FC | 2–1 | New England Revolution | Toronto, Ontario |
| 7:30 PM EDT | Sands 43' (o.g.); Dorsch 45+6'; Zimmerman (yellow card) 74'; Mihailović (red card) 76' | Report | Raines (yellow card) 25'; Harris 90' | Stadium: BMO Field; Attendance: 21,402; Referee: Joe Dickerson |

| August 19 20 | D.C. United | 0–3 | New England Revolution | Washington, D.C. |
| 7:30 PM EDT | Dozzell (yellow card) 26' | Report | Raines (yellow card) 13'; Yusuf 23', 45', 66'; Polster (yellow card) 32' | Stadium: Audi Field; Attendance: 13,848; Referee: Ricardo Fierro |

| August 23 21 | New England Revolution | 1–1 | New York City FC | Foxborough, Massachusetts |
| 4:30 PM EDT | Gil (penalty missed) 27'; Turgeman 36'; Harrison (yellow card) 69' | Report | Sands 45+1'; Parks (yellow card) 61' | Stadium: Gillette Stadium; Attendance: 30,055; Referee: Guido Gonzales Jr. |

| August 30 22 | Columbus Crew | 1–3 | New England Revolution | Columbus, Ohio |
| 7:30 PM EDT | Méndez 8'; Karumanchi (yellow card) 25' | Report | Polster 32'; Turgeman 41'; Yusuf (yellow card) 78'; Gil 79' | Stadium: ScottsMiracle-Gro Field; Attendance: 18,105; Referee: Jon Freemon |

| September 5 23 | LA Galaxy | 2–1 | New England Revolution | Carson, California |
| 9:30 PM EDT | Reus 11' (pen.); Taylor 33'; Miller (yellow card) 59'; Lozano (yellow card) 62' | Report | Sands (yellow card) 10'; Harrison (yellow card) 44'; Fofana (yellow card) 76'; Gil 90+6' (pen.) | Stadium: Dignity Health Sports Park; Attendance: 18,353; Referee: Drew Fischer |

| September 9 24 | New York City FC | 1–2 | New England Revolution | New York, New York |
| 7:30 PM EDT | Luighi 71' | Report | Gil 12' (pen.); Yusuf (yellow card) 18'; Polster (yellow card) 31'; Gazdag 90+3' | Stadium: Citi Field; Attendance: 17,197; Referee: Allen Chapman |

| September 13 25 | Chicago Fire FC | 1–2 | New England Revolution | Chicago, Illinois |
| 6:30 PM EDT | Allen (yellow card) 43'; Haile-Selassie 62'; Oregel (yellow card) 84' | Report | Turgeman 39'; Miller 47', (yellow card) 58'; Polster (yellow card) 52' | Stadium: Soldier Field; Attendance: 26,324; Referee: Rubiel Vazquez |

| September 19 26 | New England Revolution | 4–2 | Orlando City SC | Foxborough, Massachusetts |
| 7:30 PM EDT | Raines (yellow card) 14'; Gil 19', 90+6'; Sands (yellow card) 47'; Miller 59', 90+3', (yellow card) 90+4'; Feingold (yellow card) 80' | Report | Angulo 62'; Ojeda 88' (pen.) | Stadium: Gillette Stadium; Attendance: 26,100; Referee: Sergii Boiko |

| September 26 27 | Real Salt Lake | 3–0 | New England Revolution | Sandy, Utah |
| 9:30 PM EDT | Hezarkhani 2'; Guilavogui (yellow card) 46'; Solans 62', 80'; Cabral (yellow card) 75' | Report | Gil (yellow card) 46'; Wynder (yellow card) 61' | Stadium: America First Field; Attendance: 20,918; Referee: Ricardo Fierro |

| October 10 28 | New England Revolution | 0–3 | Seattle Sounders FC | Foxborough, Massachusetts |
| 7:30 PM EDT | Sands (yellow card) 24' | Report | Dotson 15', (yellow card) 56'; C. Roldan (yellow card) 19'; Joveljić 74'; Arriola 81' | Stadium: Gillette Stadium; Attendance: 20,467; Referee: Tori Penso |

| October 14 29 | FC Cincinnati | 2–3 | New England Revolution | Cincinnati, Ohio |
| 7:30 PM EDT | Barlow 13', (yellow card) 44'; Malacia (yellow card) 31'; Denkey 67'; Evander (yellow card) 84' | Report | Feingold (yellow card) 4'; Turgeman 21', 51'; Wynder 43' | Stadium: TQL Stadium; Attendance: 24,060; Referee: Rubiel Vazquez |

| October 17 30 | New England Revolution | 1–0 | Chicago Fire FC | Foxborough, Massachusetts |
| 7:30 PM EDT | Polster 26'; Kohler (yellow card) 79' | Report | Gutman (yellow card) 58' | Stadium: Gillette Stadium; Attendance: 34,506; Referee: Nabil Bensalah |

| October 24 31 | Philadelphia Union | 1–2 | New England Revolution | Chester, Pennsylvania |
| 7:30 PM EDT | Damiani (yellow card) 61'; Lukić (yellow card) 63'; Pierre 90+12' | Report | Turgeman 45+3'; Yueill (yellow card) 65'; Gil 90+1' (pen.) | Stadium: Subaru Park; Attendance: 18,524; Referee: Malik Badawi |

| October 28 32 | New England Revolution | 3–2 | New York Red Bulls | Foxborough, Massachusetts |
| 7:30 PM EDT | Turgeman 9', 46'; Feingold (yellow card) 40'; Gazdag 83'; Siqueira (yellow card) 90+3' | Report | Donkor (yellow card) 12'; Nealis (yellow card) 48'; Cowell 51'; Hall 64', (yellow card) 76' | Stadium: Gillette Stadium; Attendance: 18,611; Referee: Chris Penso |

| November 1 33 | New England Revolution | 1–2 | Inter Miami CF | Foxborough, Massachusetts |
| 7:00 PM EST | Gazdag 53'; Langoni (yellow card) 90+6' | Report | Luján (yellow card) 25'; Berterame 69'; Galarza (yellow card) 75'; Messi 83'; Segovia (yellow card) 85' | Stadium: Gillette Stadium; Attendance: 54,112; Referee: Sergii Boiko |

| November 7 34 | Orlando City SC | 1–0 | New England Revolution | Orlando, Florida |
| 4:00 PM EDT | B. Ojeda 45'; Crépeau (yellow card) 90+1' | Report | | Stadium: Inter.co Stadium; Attendance: 22,509; Referee: Guido Gonzales Jr. |

=== MLS Cup playoffs ===
| November 21 Round one match 1 | New England Revolution | 2–0 | Philadelphia Union | Foxborough, Massachusetts |
| 2:00 PM EST | Harriel 11' (o.g.); Sands (yellow card) 45'; Miller 73' | Report | Harriel (yellow card) 17'; Wagner (yellow card) 77' | Stadium: Gillette Stadium; Attendance: 18,084; Referee: Lorenzo Hernandez |

| November 28 Round one match 2 | Philadelphia Union | v | New England Revolution | Chester, Pennsylvania |
| 4:30 PM EST | | | | Stadium: Subaru Park |

| December 2 Round one match 3 | New England Revolution | v | Philadelphia Union | Foxborough, Massachusetts |
| EST | | | | Stadium: Gillette Stadium |

=== U.S. Open Cup ===
On December 4, US Soccer announced that the Revolution would enter the 2026 U.S. Open Cup in the Round of 32, along with 15 other MLS teams. The team were seeded as hosts for the match.

| April 14 Round of 32 | New England Revolution (Massachusetts) | 1–1 (a.e.t.) (3–1 p) | Rhode Island FC | Pawtucket, Rhode Island |
| 7:00 PM EDT | Fagúndez 51'; Miller (yellow card) 54'; Zambrano (yellow card) 75'; Oyirwoth (yellow card) 90+4'; Da (yellow card) 120+3' | Report | Shapiro-Thompson (yellow card) 43'; Yao (yellow card) 64'; J. Williams 90+11'; Sanchez (yellow card) 99' | Stadium: Centreville Bank Stadium; Attendance: 6,073; Referee: Atahan Yaya |
| | Penalties |
| | Langoni (penalty scored); Farrell (penalty scored); Feingold (penalty missed); Beason (penalty scored) | | (penalty scored) H. Diop; (penalty missed) J. Kwizera; (penalty missed) L. Afonso; (penalty missed) J. Williams |

| April 29 Round of 16 | New England Revolution (Massachusetts) | 3–4 | (Florida) Orlando City SC | Pawtucket, Rhode Island |
| 7:30 PM EDT | Fry 21'; Farrell 38'; Zambrano 58'; Fagúndez (yellow card) 78'; Oyirwoth (yellow card) 88' | Report | Guske (yellow card) 1'; Iago 31'; Dorsey 40'; Gómez (yellow card) 41'; Ellis 70'; Taifi 90+2' | Stadium: Centreville Bank Stadium; Referee: Abdou Ndiaye |

=== Leagues Cup ===
New England Revolution did not qualify for the 2026 Leagues Cup as they were not one of the top 9 teams in the Eastern Conference.

== Transfers ==
=== Transfers in ===
| Date | Position | No. | Name | From | Fee/notes | Ref. |
|---|---|---|---|---|---|---|
| August 27 | MF | 65 | (United States) Judah Siqueira | (United States) New England Revolution II | Home Grown | |
| August 13 | DF | x | (South Africa) Tylon Smith | (England) Queens Park Rangers F.C. | Loan | |
| July 25 | MF | 11 | (England) Jack Harrison | (England) Leeds United FC | Transfer | |
| July 15 | DF | 15 | (United States) Cody Baker | (United States) Seattle Sounders FC | Loan | |
| July 1 | FW | 27 | (United States) Wilson Harris | (Israel) Maccabi Netanya | Free Agent | |
| March 27 | FW | 17 | (United States) (Ecuador) Marcos Zambrano | (United States) Real Salt Lake | Loan | |
| March 13 | MF | 77 | (United States) (Uruguay) Diego Fagundez | (United States) Los Angeles Galaxy | Free Agent | |
| February 5 | MF | – | (Panama) John David Gunn | (United States) New England Revolution II | Transfer | |
| January 20 | MF | 7 | (United States) Griffin Yow | (Belgium) KVC Westerlo | Transfer | |
| January 14 | MF | 35 | (United States) (Brazil) Cristiano Oliveira | (United States) New England Revolution II | Home Grown | |
| December 31 | DF | 22 | (Indonesia) Ethan Kohler | (Germany) SV Werder Bremen | Transfer | |
| December 23 | MF | 21 | (United States) Brooklyn Raines | (United States) Houston Dynamo FC | Trade, U-22 | |

=== Transfers out ===
| Date | Position | No. | Name | To | Fee/notes | Ref. |
|---|---|---|---|---|---|---|
| July 24 | DF | 3 | (Colombia) Brayan Ceballos | (Canada) CF Montreal | Trade | |
| November 25 | FW | 17 | (Cameroon) (Nigeria) Ignatius Ganago | (France) FC Nantes | Loan Ended | |
| November 25 | DF | 16 | (United States) Wyatt Omsberg | — | Retired | |
| December 22 | DF | 5 | (United States) Brandon Bye | (United States) Portland Timbers | Out of Contract | |
| December 26 | MF | 7 | (Argentina) Tomás Chancalay | (United States) Minnesota United FC | Trade | |
| January 23 | DF | 43 | (United States) Santiago Suarez | (United States) San Antonio FC | Loan | |
| January 26 | GK | 24 | (United States) Alex Bono | (United States) D.C. United | Trade | |

=== MLS SuperDraft picks ===
2026 New England Revolution SuperDraft Picks
| Round | Selection | Player | Position | College | Status |
| 1 | 8 | - | - | - | Trade to DC United |
| 2 | 38 | Schinieder Mimy | DF | UCLA | |
| 3 | 68 | Kyle McGowan | FW | Denver | |

== See also ==
- 2026 New England Revolution II season
