= 2024 New England Revolution season =

New England Revolution 2024 soccer season

New England Revolution
2024 season
- President: Brian Bilello
- Head Coach: Caleb Porter
- Stadium: Gillette Stadium
- MLS: Conference: 14th Overall: 26th
- CONCACAF Champions Cup: Quarterfinals
- Leagues Cup: Round of 32
- MLS Cup: Did not qualify
- Average home league attendance: 29,203
Home colors	Away colors

The 2024 New England Revolution season was the club's 29th season in existence, and their 29th consecutive season playing in Major League Soccer, the top flight of American soccer. The season began on February 21 when the club defeated Club Atlético Independiente in the first round of the 2024 CONCACAF Champions Cup. The Revolution will also play in the 2024 Leagues Cup.

== Background ==
The 2023 season was the Revolution's 28th season of existence, and their 28th season in MLS, the top tier of American soccer. The season began on February 25 when the club began their play in the 2023 Major League Soccer season, and the season concluded on October 21. The Revolution finished the year 15–9–10 (55 points) leaving them 5th in the Eastern Conference. They lost to Philadelphia Union in the first round of the 2023 MLS Cup Playoffs. In the 2023 U.S. Open Cup the Revs entered in the Third Round, defeating Hartford Athletic 2–1, before bowing out in the Round of 32 to Pittsburgh Riverhounds SC. The season was marred by the mid-season suspension, and later resignation, of head coach Bruce Arena. On December 19, 2023, the team announced that it had hired Caleb Porter to be the next head coach.

== Summary ==
=== Pre-season ===
The Revolution opened their 2024 preseason on January 13 with entrance physicals for players in Foxborough. The first week was spent training in Massachusetts, before the team departed to IMG Academy in Bradenton, Florida for a four-week training camp. The Revolution announced five friendly matches against four different MLS opponents leading up to their CONCACAF Champions Cup opener. Their first match was a 3-0 loss to the New York Red Bulls.

== Club ==
=== Roster ===
Appearances and goals are career totals from MLS Regular Season.

Squad No.	Name	Nationality	Position(s)	Date of birth (age)	Signed from	Games played	Goals scored
Goalkeepers
1	Henrich Ravas	(Slovakia)	GK	August 16, 1997 (aged 26)	(Poland) Widzew Łódź	0	0
36	Earl Edwards Jr.	(United States)	GK	January 24, 1992 (age 34)	(United States) D.C. United	34	0
98	Jacob Jackson	(United States)	GK	April 25, 2000 (aged 23)	(United States) Loyola Marymount Lions	2	0
Defenders
2	Dave Romney	(United States)	DF	June 12, 1993 (aged 30)	(United States) Nashville SC	205	8
4	Henry Kessler	(United States)	DF	June 25, 1998 (aged 25)	(United States) Virginia Cavaliers	81	4
6	Jonathan Mensah	(United States) (Ghana)	DF	July 13, 1990 (aged 33)	(United States) San Jose Earthquakes	185	7
12	Nick Lima	(United States)	DF	November 17, 1994 (aged 28)	(United States) Austin FC	195	8
15	Brandon Bye	(United States)	DF	November 29, 1995 (aged 27)	(United States) Western Michigan Broncos	153	9
24	DeJuan Jones	(Canada) (United States)	DF	June 24, 1996 (aged 27)	(United States) Michigan State Spartans	125	6
25	Peyton Miller	(United States)	DF	November 8, 2007 (aged 16)	(United States) Revs II	0	0
34	Ryan Spaulding	(United States)	DF	September 10, 1998 (aged 25)	(United States) Revs II	9	0
43	Santiago Suárez	(United States) (Uruguay)	DF	April 23, 2005 (aged 18)	(United States) Revs II	0	0
88	Andrew Farrell	(United States)	DF	April 2, 1992 (aged 31)	(United States) Louisville Cardinals	327	2
Midfielders
8	Matt Polster	(United States)	MF	June 8, 1993 (aged 30)	(Scotland) Rangers	186	9
10	Carles Gil	(Spain)	MF	November 22, 1992 (aged 30)	(Spain) Deportivo La Coruña	133	32
11	Dylan Borrero	(Colombia)	MF	January 5, 2002 (aged 21)	(Brazil) Atlético Mineiro	15	5
16	Joshua Bolma	(Ghana) (United States)	MF	April 10, 2002 (aged 21)	(United States) University of Maryland	1	0
14	Ian Harkes	(United States)	MF	March 30, 1995 (aged 28)	(Scotland) Dundee United FC	42	4
18	Emmanuel Boateng	(Ghana) (United States)	MF	January 17, 1994 (aged 29)	(United States) Columbus Crew	187	15
21	Nacho Gil	(Spain)	MF	September 9, 1995 (aged 28)	(Spain) FC Cartagena	13	0
22	Jack Panayotou	(United States)	MF	June 5, 2004 (aged 19)	(United States) Revs II	11	0
26	Tommy McNamara	(Republic of Ireland) (United States)	MF	February 6, 1991 (aged 32)	(United States) Houston Dynamo FC	214	22
28	Mark-Anthony Kaye	(Canada)	MF	December 2, 1994 (aged 28)	(Canada) Toronto FC	148	15
29	Noel Buck	(England)	MF	April 5, 2005 (aged 18)	(United States) Revs II	32	4
47	Esmir Bajraktarevic	(Bosnia and Herzegovina) (United States)	MF	March 10, 2005 (aged 18)	(United States) Revs II	16	0
Forwards
5	Tomás Chancalay	(Argentina)	FW	January 1, 1999 (aged 24)	(Argentina) Racing Club	11	6
9	Giacomo Vrioni	(Albania)	FW	October 15, 1998 (aged 25)	(Italy) Juventus FC	36	7
17	Bobby Wood	(United States)	FW	November 15, 1992 (aged 30)	(United States) Real Salt Lake	60	12
32	Malcolm Fry	(United States)	FW	May 15, 2005 (aged 18)	(United States) Revs II	0	0

=== Roster exemptions ===
Squad No.	Name	Nationality	Position(s)	Date of birth (age)	2024 Status
72	Damian Rivera	(United States) (Costa Rica)	MF	December 8, 2002 (aged 20)	Season-long loan to Tampa Bay Rowdies

== Non-competitive ==
=== Preseason exhibitions ===
January 24 1	New York Red Bulls	3–0	New England Revolution	Bradenton, Florida
1:00 pm EST	Emil Forsberg Manoel Sofo	Report		Stadium: IMG Academy

February 1 2	FC Cincinnati	2–0	New England Revolution	Bradenton, Florida
12:00 pm EST	Boupendza,	Report		Stadium: IMG Academy
Note: The friendly match was played over 120 minutes and had four 30-minute periods.

February 10 3	Orlando City SC	3–1	New England Revolution	Orlando, Florida
7:30 pm EST	Torres 10'; Miller 50' (o.g.); Cartagena 62'	Report	Polster 1'	Stadium: Inter&Co Stadium; Referee: Ricardo Montero

February 14 4	Philadelphia Union	0–0	New England Revolution	Clearwater, Florida
1:10 pm EST		Report		Stadium: Joe DiMaggio Sports Complex; Attendance: 40

February 15 5	FC Cincinnati	5–2	New England Revolution	Clearwater, Florida
1:00 pm EST	Kubo (red card) 36'; Acosta 40'; Bucha 60'; trialist 69'; Boupendza 78', 82'	Report	35' (o.g.); Panayotou 71'	Stadium: Walter Campbell Sports Park

== Competitive ==
=== Major League Soccer ===
==== Results ====
February 24 1	D.C. United	3–1	New England Revolution	Washington, D.C.
7:30 PM EST	Benteke 34', 72', 90+3'; Santos (yellow card) 49'; Stroud (yellow card) 54'; Fletcher (yellow card) 77'	Report	Vrioni (yellow card) 12' (yellow-red card) 25'; C. Gil (yellow card) 39', (goal) 67'; Harkes (yellow card) 70'	Stadium: Audi Field; Attendance: 19,215; Referee: Andrew Musashe

March 3 2	New England Revolution	0–1	Toronto FC	Foxborough, Massachusetts
2:00 PM EST		Report	Insigne 27'; Bernardeschi (yellow card) 73'; Gomis (yellow card) 82'; Johnson (yellow card) 87'; Akinola (yellow card) 90+3'	Stadium: Gillette Stadium; Attendance: 29,293; Referee: Wesley Costa

March 9 3	Atlanta United FC	4–1	New England Revolution	Atlanta, Georgia
7:30 PM EST	Almada 45+2' (pen.); Giakoumakis 55', 60', 74'	Report	Polster (yellow card) 45+1'; C. Gil 83'	Stadium: Mercedes-Benz Stadium; Attendance: 67,727; Referee: Rafael Santos

March 17 4	New England Revolution	1–2	FC Cincinnati	Foxborough, Massachusetts
2:00 PM EDT	Harkes (yellow card) 48'; Vroini 62', (yellow card) 90+4'; Jones (yellow card) 83'; N. Gil (yellow card) 90+8'	Report	Kubo 52'; Acosta 54', (yellow card) 72'; Yedlin (yellow card) 63'; Orellano (yellow card) 69'; Bucha (yellow card) 85'; Boupendza (yellow card) 90+9'	Stadium: Gillette Stadium; Attendance: 14,557; Referee: Richonne Clark

March 23 5	New England Revolution	1–1	Chicago Fire FC	Foxborough, Massachusetts
2:00 PM EDT	N. Gil 45+4'; Harkes (yellow card) 60'; Polster (yellow card) 81'; C. Gil (yellow card) 90+5'	Report	Herbers (yellow card) 18'; Cuypers 20'; Gutiérrez (yellow card) 44'; Arigoni (yellow card) 45+2'; Barlow (yellow card) 90'	Stadium: Gillette Stadium; Attendance: 15,269; Referee: Kyle Johnston

April 6 6	New England Revolution	1–0	Charlotte FC	Foxborough, Massachusetts
7:30 PM EDT	C. Gil (yellow card) 45+2', (goal) 45+3'; Polster (yellow card) 47'	Report	Arfield (yellow card) 75'; Copetti (yellow card) 90+6'	Stadium: Gillette Stadium; Attendance: 22,196; Referee: Sergii Boiko

April 13 7	New York City FC	2–0	New England Revolution	New York, New York
7:30 PM EDT	Freese (yellow card) 45+6'; Ojeda 57'; Parks (yellow card) 78'; Fernández 90+3'	Report	Chancalay (yellow card) 22'; Harkes (yellow card) 43'; Kessler (yellow card) 77'	Stadium: Yankee Stadium; Attendance: 20,744; Referee: Pierre-Luc Lauziere

April 20 8	Toronto FC	1–0	New England Revolution	Toronto, Ontario
7:30 PM EDT	Petretta (yellow card) 8'; Osorio (yellow card) 43'; Longstaff (yellow card) 65'; Owusu 66'	Report	N. Gil (yellow card) 30'; Polster (yellow card) 42'	Stadium: BMO Field; Attendance: 24,108; Referee: Mark Allatin

April 27 9	New England Revolution	1–4	Inter Miami CF	Foxborough, Massachusetts
7:30 PM EDT	Chancalay 1'	Report	Messi 32', 67'; Cremaschi 83'; Suárez 88'	Stadium: Gillette Stadium; Attendance: 65,612; Referee: Rubiel Vazquez

May 4 10	Chicago Fire	0–1	New England Revolution	Chicago, Illinois
9:25 PM EDT	Arigoni (yellow card) 83'	Report	Kessler (yellow card) 22'; Lima (yellow card) 50'; Chancalay 62', (yellow card) 72'; Ivačič (yellow card) 90+6'	Stadium: Soldier Field; Attendance: 18,379; Referee: Sergii Demianchuk

May 11 11	New York Red Bulls	4–2	New England Revolution	Harrison, New Jersey
7:30 PM EDT	Morgan 6'; Forsberg 43'; Manoel 84'; Harper 90+3'	Report	C. Gil 24'; Kessler (yellow card) 42'; Borrero (yellow card) 66'; Chancalay (yellow card) 82'; Vrioni 90'	Stadium: Red Bull Arena; Referee: Jon Freemon

May 18 12	New England Revolution	0–3	Philadelphia Union	Foxborough, Massachusetts
7:30PM EDT	Spaulding (red card) 14'; Kessler (yellow card) 17'; Vrioni (yellow card) 66'; Arreaga (yellow card) 85'	Report	Harriel (yellow card) 30'; Carranza 38'; Gazdag 47', 80'	Stadium: Gillette Stadium; Attendance: 34,947; Referee: Filip Dujic

May 25 13	New England Revolution	0–1	New York City FC	Foxborough, Massachusetts
7:30 PM EDT	Kessler (yellow card) 13'; Borrero (yellow card) 73'; Arreaga (yellow card) 86'	Report	Bakrar (yellow card) 33'; Thiago (yellow card) 41'; Parks 81'	Stadium: Gillette Stadium; Attendance: 26,625; Referee: Ted Unkel

June 1 14	Nashville SC	1–2	New England Revolution	Nashville, Tennessee
8:30 PM EDT	Mukhtar 80'; Yearwood (yellow card) 90+8'	Report	C. Gil 18'; Bajraktarevic 51'; Arreaga (yellow card) 53'; Polster (yellow card) 73'; Ivačič (yellow card) 88'	Stadium: Geodis Park; Attendance: 26,842; Referee: Ismail Elfath

June 8 15	New England Revolution	1–0	New York Red Bulls	Foxborough, Massachusetts
7:30 PM EDT	Polster (yellow card) 64'; Boateng 81'	Report	Nealis (yellow card) 44'	Stadium: Gillette Stadium; Attendance: 29,288; Referee: Alexis Da Silva

June 15 16	New England Revolution	3–2	Vancouver Whitecaps FC	Foxborough, Massachusetts
7:30 PM EDT	Buck 7'; Vrioni 21'; Arreaga (yellow card) 29'; Bajraktarević 39'	Report	Gauld 13', 90+4'; Picault (yellow card) 89'; Berhalter (yellow card) 90+2'	Stadium: Gillette Stadium; Attendance: 27,028; Referee: Natalie Simon

June 22 17	FC Cincinnati	1–2	New England Revolution	Cincinnati, Ohio
7:30 PM EDT	Nwobodo (yellow card) 34' (red card) 69'; Powell (yellow card) 45+3'; Kubo (yellow card) 50'; Yedlin (yellow card) 54'; Orellano (yellow card) 63'; Asad 65'	Report	Vrioni 21', 41', (yellow card) 81'	Stadium: TQL Stadium; Attendance: 25,513; Referee: Jon Freemon

June 29 18	New England Revolution	1–5	Columbus Crew SC	Foxborough, Massachusetts
7:30 PM EDT	Boateng 9'	Report	Hernández 17'; Arfsten 42'; Amundsen (yellow card) 45'; Rossi 45+2'; Camacho 72'; Moreira 80'	Stadium: Gillette Stadium; Attendance: 25,004; Referee: Ricardo Fierro

July 3 19	New England Revolution	2–1	Atlanta United FC	Foxborough, Massachusetts
7:30 PM EDT	Vrioni 11', 45'	Report	Gregersen (yellow card) 37'; Ríos 90+1'	Stadium: Gillette Stadium; Attendance: 20,171; Referee: Jair Marrufo

July 6 20	Seattle Sounders FC	2–0	New England Revolution	Seattle, Washington
10:30 PM EDT	Morris 15', (yellow card) 90+4'; Rusnák 81'	Report	Arreaga (yellow card) 23'; Polster (yellow card) 89'	Stadium: Lumen Field; Attendance: 30,017; Referee: Ismir Pekmic

July 13 21	New England Revolution	1–3	Orlando City SC	Foxborough, Massachusetts
7:30 PM EDT	Vrioni 23'; Harkes (yellow card) 68'	Report	Jansson (yellow card) 50'; Torres 51', 81'; Enrique 59'; Schlegel (yellow card) 78'	Stadium: Gillette Stadium; Attendance: 24,193; Referee: Sergii Boiko

July 17 22	Philadelphia Union	5–1	New England Revolution	Chester, Pennsylvania
7:30 PM EDT	Baribo 29', 44', 52'; Glesnes 39'; Sullivan 84'	Report	Harkes 50'; Panayotou (yellow card) 66'	Stadium: Subaru Park; Attendance: 18,554; Referee: Rubiel Vazquez

July 20 23	New England Revolution	1–1	FC Dallas	Foxborough, Massachusetts
7:30 PM EDT	Polster (yellow card) 20'; Arreaga (yellow card) 30'; Tafari 65' (o.g.); Wood (yellow card) 70'; Ivačič (yellow card) 90'; Kessler (yellow card) 90+4'	Report	Ibeagha (yellow card) 36'; Tafari (yellow card) 49'; Arriola 90+5'	Stadium: Gillette Stadium; Attendance: 28,260; Referee: Pierre-Luc Lauziere

August 24 24	CF Montréal	0–5	New England Revolution	Montreal, Quebec
7:30 PM EDT	Duke (yellow card) 82'; Edwards (yellow card) 85'	Report	Wood 7', 37'; Kaye (yellow card) 30'; Lima 71'; Vrioni 79'; Langoni 83'	Stadium: Saputo Stadium; Attendance: 19,619; Referee: Ismir Pekmic

August 31 25	Real Salt Lake	2–0	New England Revolution	Sandy, Utah
9:30 PM EDT	Ojeda (yellow card) 45+2'; Julio 45+3'; Quinton 56'	Report	Lima (yellow card) 55'	Stadium: America First Field; Attendance: 20,475; Referee: Fotis Bazakos

September 7 26	New England Revolution	2–2	St. Louis City SC	Foxborough, Massachusetts
7:30 PM EDT	Vrioni (yellow card) 16'; Langoni 28'; C. Gil 40'	Report	Horn (yellow card) 21'; Kessler 23', (yellow card) 51'; Löwen (yellow card) 56'; Hiebert (yellow card) 59'; Becher 73'	Stadium: Gillette Stadium; Attendance: 30,512; Referee: Timothy Ford
Note: Match was originally scheduled for June 21

September 14 27	Orlando City SC	3–0	New England Revolution	Orlando, Florida
9:30 PM EDT	Santos 22'; Torres 45+2' (pen.); Cartagena (yellow card) 52'; Enrique (yellow card) 68'; McGuire 74'	Report	Parker (yellow card) 38'; Boateng (yellow card) 78'; Bajraktarević (yellow card) 90+3'	Stadium: Inter&Co Stadium; Attendance: 22,062; Referee: Tori Penso

September 18 28	New England Revolution	2–2	CF Montréal	Foxborough, Massachusetts
8:30 PM EDT	Wood 24'; Bajraktarević 35'; Miller (yellow card) 80'; Boateng (yellow card) 86'	Report	Pearce (yellow card) 49', (goal) 54'; Saliba 68'; Marshall-Rutty 72'	Stadium: Gillette Stadium; Attendance: 18,019; Referee: Elijio Arreguin

September 21 29	Charlotte FC	4–0	New England Revolution	Charlotte, North Carolina
7:30 PM EDT	Abada 39'; Byrne (yellow card) 51'; Biel 65'; Agyemang 77'; Malanda (yellow card) 82'; Vargas 87'	Report	C. Gil (yellow card) 32'; Parker (yellow card) 53'; Borrero (yellow card) 70' (yellow-red card) 70'	Stadium: Bank of America Stadium; Referee: Mark Allatin

September 28 30	New England Revolution	1–0	Nashville SC	Foxborough, Massachusetts
7:30 PM EDT	Polster (yellow card) 43'; Bye 86'	Report	Moore (yellow card) 41'	Stadium: Gillette Stadium; Attendance: 42,312; Referee: Marcos de Oliveira

October 2 31	Houston Dynamo FC	2–1	New England Revolution	Houston, Texas
8:30 PM EDT	Steres (yellow card) 8'; Ponce 50', (yellow card) 90+6'; Sviatchenko 68'	Report	C. Gil 54' (pen.); Miller (yellow card) 68'	Stadium: Shell Energy Stadium; Attendance: 15,356; Referee: Fotis Bazakos

October 5 32	New England Revolution	1–2	D.C. United	Foxborough, Massachusetts
7:30 PM EDT	Langoni (yellow card) 54'; Peltola 74' (o.g.); N. Gil (yellow card) 75'	Report	Santos 3' (yellow card) 72'; Benteke 8'; Bartlett 75'	Stadium: Gillette Stadium; Attendance: 44,110; Referee: Alexis da Silva

October 12 33	Columbus Crew SC	4–0	New England Revolution	Columbus, Ohio
7:30 PM EDT	D. Jones 5'; Mățan 14', 64', 72'	Report	Romney (yellow card) 51'; Boateng (yellow card) 79'	Stadium: Lower.com Field; Attendance: 20,439; Referee: Filip Dujic
Note: Match rescheduled from May 29 due to Columbus Crew's participation in the 2024 CONCACAF Champions Cup final.

October 19 34	Inter Miami CF	6–2	New England Revolution	Fort Lauderdale, Florida
6:00 PM EDT	Suárez 40', 43'; Cremaschi 58'; Messi 78', 81', 89'	Report	Langoni 2'; Borrero 34'	Stadium: Chase Stadium; Attendance: 21,429; Referee: Alexis Da Silva

=== CONCACAF Champions Cup ===
The Revolution entered the 2024 CONCACAF Champions cup in the first round. They qualified after finishing in sixth-place in the 2023 MLS Supporters' shield. Their qualification was confirmed after MLS Cup 2023 in which the Columbus Crew won. The draw for the competition was performed on December 13, 2023, and the Revolution were drawn against Panamanian side Club Atlético Independiente.

==== Round one ====
February 21 First leg	CAI de La Chorrera (Panama)	0–1	(United States) New England Revolution	Penonomé, Panama
8:00 PM EST	Fields (yellow card) 12'; De La Espada (yellow card) 48'; Murillo (yellow card) 51'	Report	Chancalay 54'; Vrioni (yellow card) 28'	Stadium: Estadio Universitario F.C. Attendance: 1,107; Referee: Walter Lopez (Guatemala)

February 29 Second leg	New England Revolution (United States)	3–0 (4–0 agg.)	(Panama) CAI de La Chorrera	Foxborough, Massachusetts
8:15 PM EST	Vrioni (yellow card) 20'; N. Gil 21'; Chancalay 58'; Kaye 90+3'	Report	Modelo (yellow card) 39'	Stadium: Gillette Stadium; Attendance: 5,943; Referee: Ismael Cornejo (El Salvador)
Note: New England Revolution won 4–0 on aggregate.

==== Round of 16 ====
March 6 First leg	New England Revolution (United States)	4–0	(Costa Rica) Alajuelense	Foxborough, Massachusetts
6:00 PM EST	Lima 28'; Chancalay 41', 50' (pen.); Bajraktarevic 55'; Jones (yellow card) 67'	Report	Lawrence (yellow card) 20'; Moya (yellow card) 53'	Stadium: Gillette Stadium; Attendance: 6,391; Referee: Adonai Escobedo (Mexico)

March 14 Second leg	Alajuelense (Costa Rica)	1–1 (1–5 agg.)	(United States) New England Revolution	Alajuela, Costa Rica
8:00 PM EDT	Mora 4'; James (yellow card) 79'	Report	Vrioni 81'	Stadium: Estadio Alejandro Morera Soto; Attendance: 7,315; Referee: César Arturo Ramos (Mexico)
Note: New England Revolution won 5–1 on aggregate

==== Quarterfinals ====
April 2 First leg (Note: The Revolution were slated to host the second leg of the quarterfinals due to their superior record in the competition, but due to a scheduling conflict at Gillette Stadium, they requested to host the first leg.)	New England Revolution (United States)	0–4	(Mexico) Club América	Foxborough, Massachusetts
9:00 PM EDT	Polster (yellow card) 20'; Vrioni (yellow card) 44'; Jonathan (yellow card) 60'	Report	Martín 16'; Zendejas 24'; Calderón 63' (yellow card) 44'; Rodríguez 90+1'	Stadium: Gillette Stadium; Attendance: 11,978; Referee: Ismael Cornejo

April 9 Second leg	Club América (Mexico)	5–2 (9–2 agg.)	(United States) New England Revolution	Mexico City, Mexico
10:30 PM EDT	Valdés 21'; Quiñones 34'; Martín 45+4'; Zendejas 57'; Rodríguez 76' (pen.)	Report	Kessler (yellow card) 49'; Vrioni 65', 90+2'; Spaulding (yellow card) 89'; Kaye (yellow card) 90'	Stadium: Estadio Azteca; Attendance: 18,636; Referee: Saíd Martínez
Note: Club América won 9–2 on aggregate.

=== U.S. Open Cup ===
The New England Revolution will not participate in the U.S. Open Cup this year. On December 15, 2023, Major League Soccer announced that its teams would not participate in the 2024 edition of the U.S. Open Cup due to fixture congestion. This would have been the first year since its inception that MLS teams would not participate in the tournament. The league intended to send reserve teams from MLS Next Pro instead, but the request was denied by the United States Soccer Federation on December 20. On March 1, 2024, it was announced that 19 MLS and MLS Next Pro teams will participate. The Revs are not one of the 19, nor are MLS Next Pro team Revolution II.

=== Leagues Cup ===
The Revolution entered the 2024 Leagues Cup in the group stage. On February 1, the team was drawn in a group with Nashville SC and Mazatlán F.C.

==== East 5 ====
Pos	Team	Pld	W	PW	PL	L	GF	GA	GD	Pts	Qualification	NER	MAZ	NAS
1	(United States Soccer Federation) New England Revolution	2	1	1	0	0	2	1	+1	5	Advance to knockout stage	—	1–0	1–1
2	(Mexican Football Federation) Mazatlán	2	1	0	0	1	2	1	+1	3	Advance to knockout stage	—	—	—
3	(United States Soccer Federation) Nashville SC	2	0	0	1	1	1	3	−2	1		—	0–2	—

Source: Leagues Cup
Rules for classification: Tiebreakers

July 27 Group	New England Revolution (United States)	1–0	(Mexico) Mazatlán F.C.	Foxborough, Massachusetts
8:00 PM EDT	Panayotou 69'; Polster (yellow card) 79'	Report	Sánchez (yellow card) 59'; Árciga (yellow card) 90'	Stadium: Gillette Stadium; Attendance: 16,009; Referee: Oshane Nation

August 6 Group	New England Revolution (United States)	1–1 (5–4 p)	(United States) Nashville SC	Foxborough, Massachusetts
19:30	Wood 3'; Miller (yellow card) 14'; Harkes (yellow card) 45+3'; Fry (yellow card) 90+3'	Report	Surridge (yellow card) 39', (goal) 45+1'	Stadium: Gillette Stadium; Attendance: 13,538; Referee: Alyssa Nichols (United States)
	Penalties
	McNamara (penalty scored); Polster (penalty scored); Harkes (penalty scored); Arreaga (penalty scored); Boateng (penalty missed); Bye (penalty scored)		(penalty scored) Mukhtar; (penalty scored) Sejdić; (penalty scored) Godoy; (penalty scored) Pérez; (penalty missed) Muyl; (penalty missed) Lovitz

==== Knockout stage ====
August 9 Round of 32	New England Revolution (United States)	1–1 (6–7 p)	(United States) New York City FC	Foxborough, Massachusetts
	Wood 40'	Report	Rodríguez 35' (pen.), (yellow card) 41'; Sands (yellow card) 45+2'; Haak (yellow card) 90+5'	Stadium: Gillette Stadium; Attendance: 7,267; Referee: Julio Luna (Guatemala)
	Penalties
	McNamara (penalty scored); Polster (penalty scored); Harkes (penalty scored); Arreaga (penalty scored); Bye (penalty scored); Panayotou (penalty scored); Kaye (penalty missed)		(penalty scored) Martínez; (penalty scored) Martins; (penalty scored) Moralez; (penalty scored) Sands; (penalty scored) Rodríguez; (penalty scored) Fernández; (penalty scored) Haak

== Transfers ==
=== Transfers in ===
Date	Position	No.	Name	From	Fee/notes	Ref.
November 28, 2023	MF	5	(Argentina) Tomás Chancalay	(Argentina) Racing Club	Transfer	
December 11, 2023	DF	12	(United States) Nick Lima	(United States) Austin FC	Trade	
January 1, 2024			(United States) Malcolm Fry	(United States) New England Revolution II	Homegrown player	
January 1, 2024			(United States) Peyton Miller	(United States) New England Revolution II	Homegrown player	
January 4, 2024	DF	16	(Ghana) Jonathan Mensah	(United States) San Jose Earthquakes	Free Agent	
January 6, 2024	GK	1	(Slovakia) Henrich Ravas	(Poland) Widzew Łódź	Transfer	
April 23, 2024			(United States) Xavier Arreaga	(United States) Seattle Sounders FC	Trade	
April 23, 2024			(Slovenia) Aljaž Ivačič	(United States) Portland Timbers	Free	

=== Transfers out ===
Date	Position	No.	Name	To	Fee/notes	Ref.
December 1, 2023	FW	7	(Argentina) Gustavo Bou	(Argentina) Talleres	Out of contract	
December 1, 2023	FW	12	(United States) Justin Rennicks	(Finland) AC Oulu	Out of contract	
December 1, 2023	DF	3	(United States) Omar Gonzalez	(United States) FC Dallas	Out of contract	
December 1, 2023	MF	3	(Brazil) Maciel	(United States) New England Revolution II	Option declined	
December 1, 2023	DF	6	(Venezuela) Christian Makoun	(Cyprus) Anorthosis Famagusta FC	Option declined	
December 1, 2023	DF	77	(United States) Ben Reveno		Option declined	
December 1, 2023	DF	44	(United States) Ben Sweat	Retired	Option declined	
January 5, 2024			(Brazil) Maciel	(United States) New England Revolution II	Free	
January 10, 2024	GK	1	(Czech Republic) Tomáš Vaclík	(Spain) Albacete	Contract buyout	
January 10, 2024			(United States) Omar Gonzalez	(United States) FC Dallas	Free	
January 16, 2024			(United States) Jordan Adebayo-Smith	(United States) Minnesota United FC	Trade	
January 31, 2024			(Argentina) Gustavo Bou	(Argentina) Talleres	Free	
February 13, 2024			(Czech Republic) Tomáš Vaclík	(Spain) Albacete	Free	
February 19, 2024			(Costa Rica) Damian Rivera	(United States) Tampa Bay Rowdies	Loan	
April 29, 2024			(United States) Jacob Jackson	(United States) San Jose Earthquakes	Free	
May 10, 2024			(United States) Jack Panayotou	(United States) Rhode Island FC	Loan	

=== MLS SuperDraft picks ===
2024 New England Revolution SuperDraft Picks
Round	Selection	Player	Position	College	Status
1	20	--	--	--	Traded to MIN
2	49	--	--	--	Traded to DCU
3	78	--	--	--	Traded to MIN

== See also ==
- 2024 New England Revolution II season
