= Luca Langoni =

Argentine footballer (born 2002)

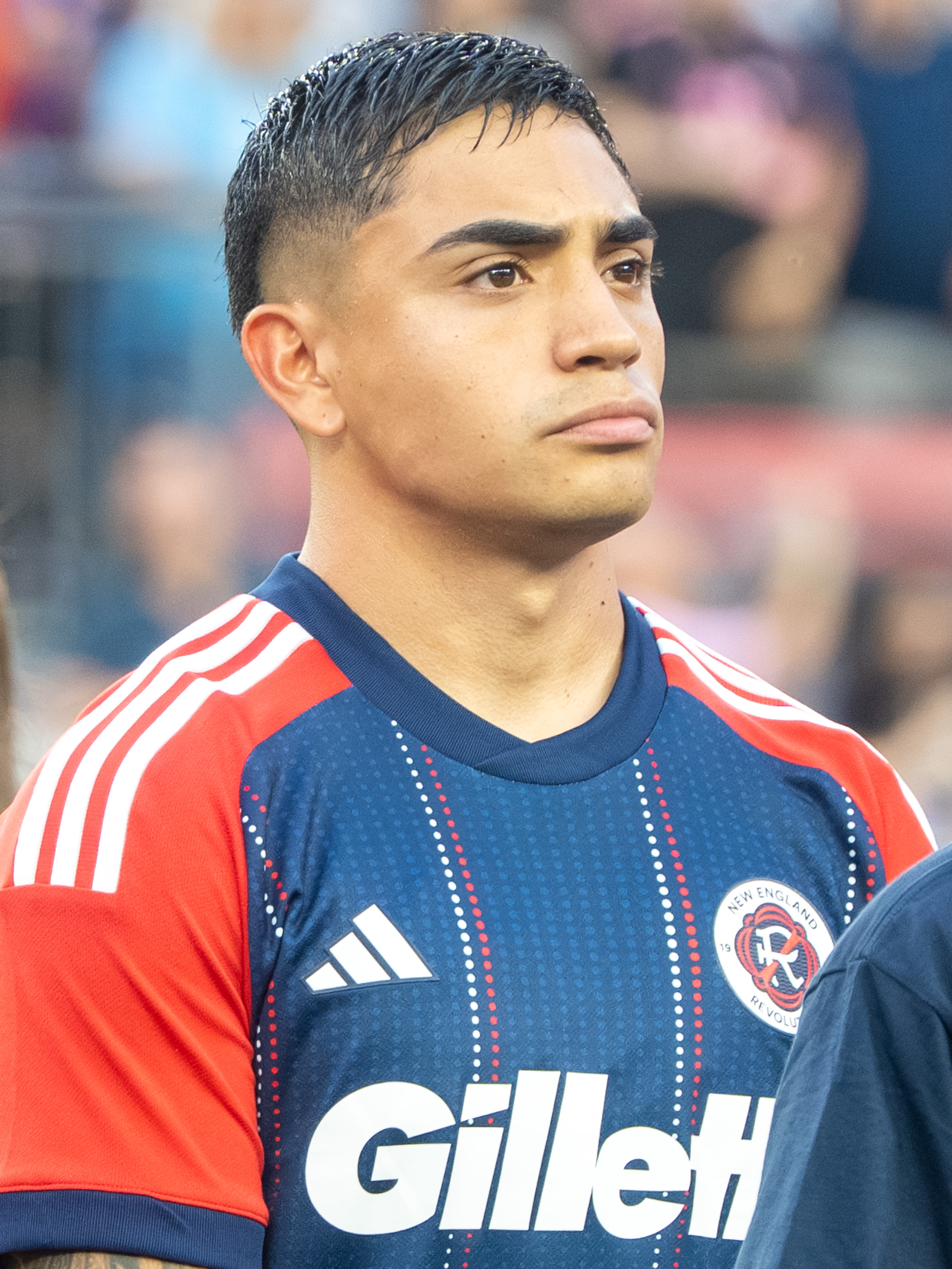
- Langoni in 2025

Personal information
- Full name: Luca Daniel Langoni
- Date of birth: 9 February 2002 (age 24)
- Place of birth: Gregorio de Laferrère, Buenos Aires, Argentina
- Height: 1.72 m (5 ft 8 in)
- Position: Forward

Team information
- Current team: New England Revolution
- Number: 41

Youth career
- Boca Juniors

Senior career*
Years	Team	Apps	(Gls)
2022–2024	Boca Juniors	33	(9)
2024–	New England Revolution	43	(6)
- * Club domestic league appearances and goals as of 01:24, 4 April 2026 (UTC)

Luca Daniel Langoni (born 9 February 2002) is an Argentine professional footballer who plays as a forward for Major League Soccer club New England Revolution.

== Club career ==
Born in Gregorio de Laferrère, Buenos Aires, Langoni made his debut for Boca Juniors in June 2022. He made an explosive start to his Boca Juniors career, and has been noted for his natural goalscoring ability.

=== New England Revolution ===
On 2 August 2024, the New England Revolution announced the signing of Langoni from Boca Juniors for a club record fee, reportedly in the area of $7 million. Langoni made his first appearance for the Revolution on 24 August 2024, coming on as a second-half substitute against CF Montréal. He would subsequently score his first goal for his new club 15 minutes later, helping to secure a 5–0 win for the Revolution, and being named to the MLS Team of the Matchday for week 29. Langoni became the first player in Revolution history to score a goal and record an assist in their debut game. Langoni made his home debut on 7 September 2024 against St. Louis City SC, in what would also serve as his home debut at Gillette Stadium. He scored the Revolution's first goal of the match, cancelling out the opener from former Revs defender Henry Kessler.

In the 2026 New England Revolution season, Langoni received Team of the Matchday honors for MLS matchday 4 after recording three assists in the Revolution's 6-1 victory over the Colorado Rapids. In doing so he became only the second Revolution player in club history to record 3 assists on more in a single half, joining Lee Nguyen. He again won MLS Team of the Matchday honors in matchday 6, following a one goal one assist performance in the Revolution's 3-0 victory over CF Montréal.

== Career statistics ==
=== Club ===
As of 2 August 2024.

Appearances and goals by club, season and competition
Club	Season	League			Cup (Note: Includes Copa Argentina)		League Cup (Note: Includes Copa de la Liga Profesional)		Continental		Other		Total	
Club	Season	Division	Apps	Goals	Apps	Goals	Apps	Goals	Apps	Goals	Apps	Goals	Apps	Goals
Boca Juniors	2022	Primera División	18	6	2	1	—		—		1 (Note: Includes Trofeo de Campeones de la Liga Profesional)	0	21	7
Boca Juniors	2023	Primera División	12	3	2	0	5	0	3 (Note: Appearances in the Copa Libertadores)	0	2 (Note: Includes one appearance in Supercopa Argentina, and one appearance in Supercopa Internacional)	0	24	3
Boca Juniors	2024	Primera División	3	0	2	0	15	1	5 (Note: Appearances in the Copa Sudamericana)	0	—		25	1
Boca Juniors	Total		33	9	6	1	20	1	8	0	3	0	70	11
New England Revolution	2024	MLS	0	0	0	0	0	0	0	0	0	0	0	0
New England Revolution	Total		0	0	0	0	0	0	0	0	0	0	0	0
Career total			33	9	6	1	20	1	8	0	3	0	70	11

== Honours ==
Boca Juniors

- Primera División: 2022
- Supercopa Argentina: 2022
