= Nacho Gil =

Spanish footballer (born 1995)

Personal information
- Full name: Ignacio Gil de Pareja Vicent
- Date of birth: 9 September 1995 (age 31)
- Place of birth: Valencia, Spain
- Height: 1.68 m (5 ft 6 in)
- Position: Attacking midfielder

Team information
- Current team: Tenerife
- Number: 10

Youth career
- 2002–2014: Valencia

Senior career*
Years	Team	Apps	(Gls)
2014–2017	Valencia B	90	(15)
2017–2019	Valencia	8	(0)
2018	→ Las Palmas (loan)	14	(0)
2018–2019	→ Elche (loan)	11	(2)
2019–2020	Ponferradina	34	(1)
2020–2022	Cartagena	56	(1)
2022–2024	New England Revolution	30	(1)
2025	Volos	17	(2)
2025–	Tenerife	33	(4)
- * Club domestic league appearances and goals as of 18:03, 3 October 2026 (UTC)

Ignacio "Nacho" Gil de Pareja Vicent (born 9 September 1995) is a Spanish professional footballer who plays for Segunda División club Tenerife. Primarily an attacking midfielder, he can also play as a left winger.

Formed at Valencia, he made 22 La Liga appearances for them and for Las Palmas, while playing over 100 Segunda División games for three clubs.

== Career ==
=== Valencia ===
Born in Valencia, Gil joined hometown club Valencia CF's youth setup in 2002 at the age of seven. He made his senior debut with the reserves on 5 January 2014, starting in a 1–0 Segunda División B away loss against CE L'Hospitalet.

Gil was promoted to the B team ahead of the 2014–15 season, and scored his first senior goal on 7 December 2014 in a 1–0 away win over CF Reus Deportiu. He featured regularly for the side the following years, whilst being utilised as a forward during the 2016–17 campaign.

Gil had a loan move to Deportivo Alavés cancelled. He rejected an offer from Villarreal CF in August 2016, but submitted a transfer request to his parent club in January 2017, which was refused. Shortly after, he was called up to train with the main squad by manager Voro.

Gil made his first-team and La Liga debut on 25 February 2017, coming on as a late substitute for Mario Suárez in a 2–1 away defeat to Alavés. On 4 May, he renewed his contract until 2020.

On 25 January 2018, Gil was loaned to UD Las Palmas of the same league for six months. On 10 September, he moved to Segunda División's Elche CF also in a temporary deal.

=== Ponferradina ===
Gil terminated his contract with Valencia on 19 July 2019, and signed for second division team SD Ponferradina just hours later.

He played 35 matches in all competitions during his spell, scoring his only goal on 22 December 2019 in the 3–2 away victory against UD Almería.

=== Cartagena ===
On 18 August 2020, agreed to a two-year deal at FC Cartagena, newly promoted to the second tier. He scored once – in a 4–1 loss at Sporting de Gijón on 26 March 2022– also being sent off as a late substitute in a 1–0 away win over league leaders UD Almería on 2 January that year.

Gil was released at the end of his contract in June 2022, as the club declined an extension.

=== New England Revolution ===
On 18 August 2022, Gil joined New England Revolution of Major League Soccer. He made his debut on 10 September as a late substitute in a 2–1 loss at the New York Red Bulls.

Gil signed a new two-year deal on 5 January 2023, with a one-year option for 2025. He missed the first five months of the 2023 season due to a knee injury, returning to action on 26 July in the 5–1 away win over Atlético San Luis in the group stage of the Leagues Cup, replacing Noel Buck after 63 minutes.

Gil scored his first goal for the club on 1 March 2024, in a 3–0 victory against Club Atlético Independiente in the round of 32 of the CONCACAF Champions Cup. His only in the MLS came 22 days later, in the 1–1 home draw with Chicago Fire FC.

Gil was not offered a new contract at the end of the 2024 campaign.

=== Later career ===
Following a brief spell with Volos F.C. in the Super League Greece, Gil returned to Spain on 16 July 2025, signing a two-year deal with Primera Federación side CD Tenerife.

== Personal life ==
Gil's elder brother, Carles, is also a footballer and an attacking midfielder. He also came through at Valencia, and the pair were teammates at New England.

== Career statistics ==
As of match played 22 May 2025

Appearances and goals by club, season and competition
Club	Season	League			National cup		Continental		Other		Total	
Club	Season	Division	Apps	Goals	Apps	Goals	Apps	Goals	Apps	Goals	Apps	Goals
Valencia B	2013–14	Segunda División B	1	0	—		—		—		1	0
Valencia B	2014–15	Segunda División B	32	5	—		—		—		32	5
Valencia B	2015–16	Segunda División B	26	3	—		—		—		26	3
Valencia B	2016–17	Segunda División B	30	7	—		—		5 (Note: Appearances in Segunda División B play-offs)	1	35	8
Valencia B	2017–18	Segunda División B	1	0	—		—		—		1	0
Valencia B	Total		90	15	0	0	0	0	5	1	95	16
Valencia	2015–16	La Liga	0	0	0	0	0	0	—		0	0
Valencia	2016–17	La Liga	2	0	0	0	—		—		2	0
Valencia	2017–18	La Liga	6	0	4	0	—		—		10	0
Valencia	Total		8	0	4	0	0	0	0	0	12	0
Las Palmas (loan)	2017–18	La Liga	14	0	0	0	—		—		14	0
Elche (loan)	2018–19	Segunda División	11	2	0	0	—		—		11	2
Ponferradina	2019–20	Segunda División	34	1	1	0	—		—		35	1
Cartagena	2020–21	Segunda División	35	0	1	0	—		—		36	0
Cartagena	2021–22	Segunda División	21	1	3	0	—		—		24	1
Cartagena	Total		56	1	4	0	0	0	0	0	60	1
New England Revolution	2022	Major League Soccer	4	0	0	0	0	0	—		4	0
New England Revolution	2023	Major League Soccer	9	0	0	0	—		4 (Note: Three appearances in Leagues Cup, one appearance in MLS Cup playoffs)	0	13	0
New England Revolution	2024	Major League Soccer	17	1	—		5 (Note: Appearances in CONCACAF Champions Cup)	1	0	0	22	2
New England Revolution	Total		30	1	0	0	5	1	4	0	39	2
Volos	2024–25	Super League Greece	17	2	—		—		—		17	2
Career total			226	22	9	0	5	1	9	1	283	24
