= Carles Gil =

Spanish footballer (born 1992)

- Gil with the New England Revolution in 2026

Personal information
- Full name: Carles Gil de Pareja Vicent
- Date of birth: 22 November 1992 (age 33)
- Place of birth: Valencia, Spain
- Height: 1.71 m (5 ft 7 in)
- Position: Attacking midfielder

Team information
- Current team: New England Revolution
- Number: 10

Youth career
- 1998–2009: Valencia

Senior career*
Years	Team	Apps	(Gls)
2009–2012	Valencia B	53	(5)
2012–2015	Valencia	8	(1)
2012–2014	→ Elche (loan)	64	(5)
2015–2018	Aston Villa	28	(2)
2016–2018	→ Deportivo La Coruña (loan)	33	(1)
2018–2019	Deportivo La Coruña	18	(0)
2019–	New England Revolution	227	(62)

International career
2013	Spain U21	1	(0)
- * Club domestic league appearances and goals as of 7 November 2026

Carles Gil de Pareja Vicent (born 22 November 1992) is a Spanish professional footballer who plays as an attacking midfielder for Major League Soccer club New England Revolution, whom he captains.

He began his career at Valencia, playing mostly in their reserves and making his debut with the first team in 2014. He also spent two seasons on loan at Elche, winning promotion to La Liga in 2013. After a spell in the Premier League with Aston Villa and a return to Spain with Deportivo La Coruña, he signed for the New England Revolution.

During his time with the Revolution, Gil won multiple Major League Soccer awards, including the MLS Newcomer of the Year in 2019 and both the Landon Donovan MVP and the MLS Comeback Player of the Year in 2021.

== Club career ==
=== Valencia ===
Born in Valencia, Valencian Community, Gil was a product of Valencia CF's youth system, having joined the club at the age of five. He made his senior debut at only 17 with the reserves by playing one game in the Segunda División B, being brought to the main squad for the 2010, 2011 and 2012 pre-seasons and scoring the third goal in the latter against SV Rödinghausen (4–0 away win). Shortly after, he earned a professional contract until 2016.

Gil was loaned to neighbouring Elche CF for the 2012–13 campaign. He first played in the Segunda División on 19 August 2012, starting in a home game against SD Ponferradina and netting in an eventual 4–2 win. He scored in the following match, a 2–1 victory at Hércules CF.

After being a very important attacking unit as the club returned to La Liga after nearly 25 years, Gil remained with Elche for 2013–14, still owned by Valencia. He made his debut in the competition on 19 August 2013, in a 3–0 loss at Rayo Vallecano.

Gil scored his first goal in the top flight on 1 March 2014, the only in the home win over RC Celta de Vigo. He subsequently returned to the Mestalla Stadium, making his league debut on 29 August in a 3–0 home defeat of Málaga CF.

Gil scored his only competitive goal for Valencia on 28 September 2014, contributing to a 1–1 away draw against Real Sociedad in the domestic league.

=== Aston Villa ===
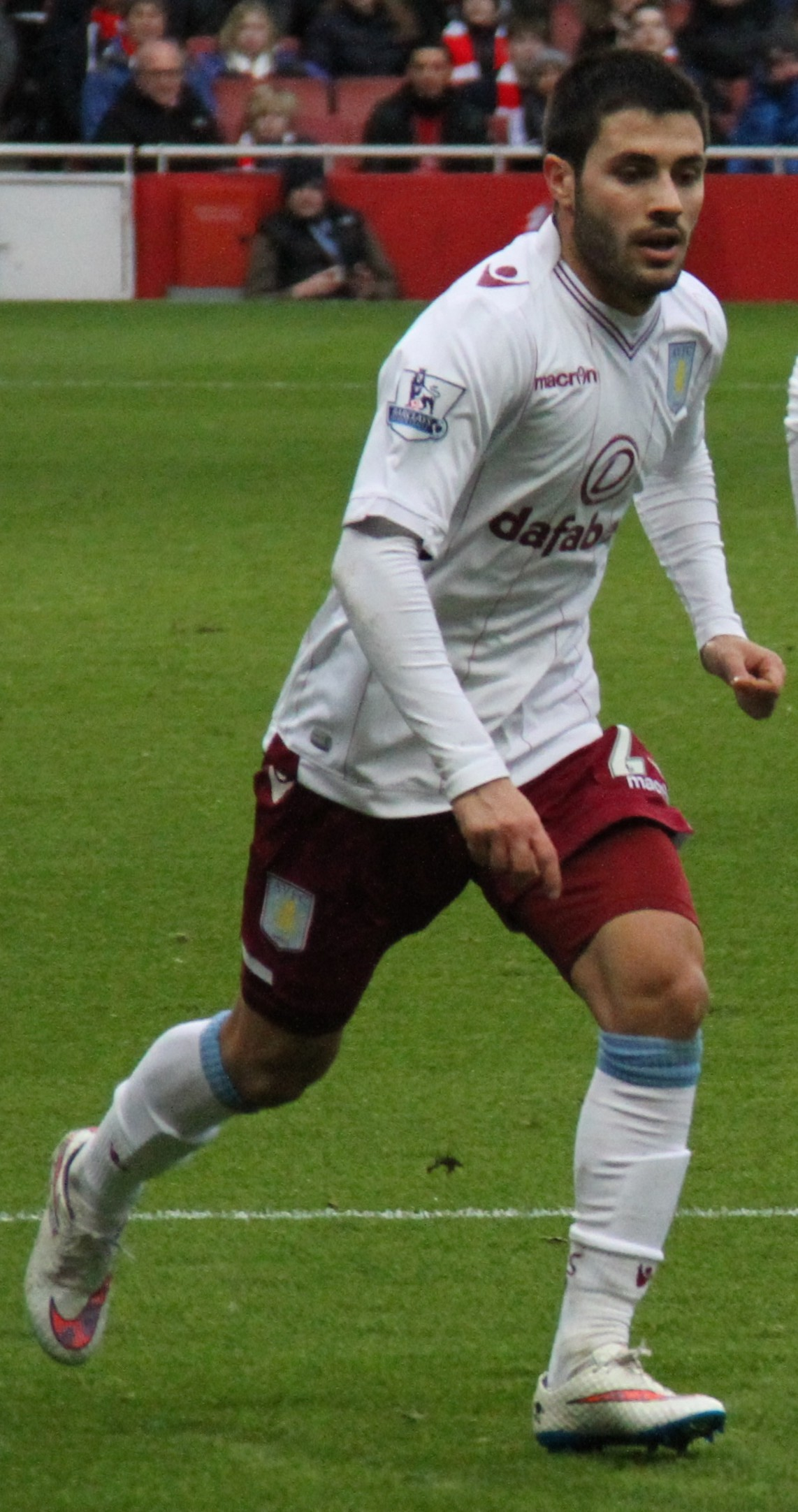
Gil playing for Aston Villa in 2015

Gil joined Premier League side Aston Villa on 13 January 2015 for a fee in the region of £3.2 million, signing a four-and-a-half-year deal and receiving the number 25 jersey. He made his debut four days later, as a 59th-minute substitute for Ashley Westwood in a 0–2 home loss to Liverpool; despite the result, manager Paul Lambert described his performance as "as good a debut as I've seen".

Gil made his first start on 25 January 2015 in an FA Cup tie against Bournemouth, scoring from the edge of the box to open a 2–1 victory. Thirteen days later he contributed his first assist for the Villans, allowing Jores Okore to score through a close-range header in a 1–2 home defeat to Chelsea.

Gil netted for the first time in the league on 13 September 2015, putting his team 2–0 up in an eventual 3–2 loss at Leicester City. The following 2 January, away to Sunderland, he equalised with an aerial volley from compatriot Adama Traoré's cross, but in a 3–1 defeat against their relegation rivals.

=== Deportivo ===
On 20 July 2016, Gil returned to his homeland's top flight, being loaned to Deportivo de La Coruña with an option to buy. The following 12 July the move was extended for a further season, with an obligatory buyout clause included. His team was eventually relegated, and he played only six minutes after the appointment of new coach Clarence Seedorf.

=== New England Revolution ===
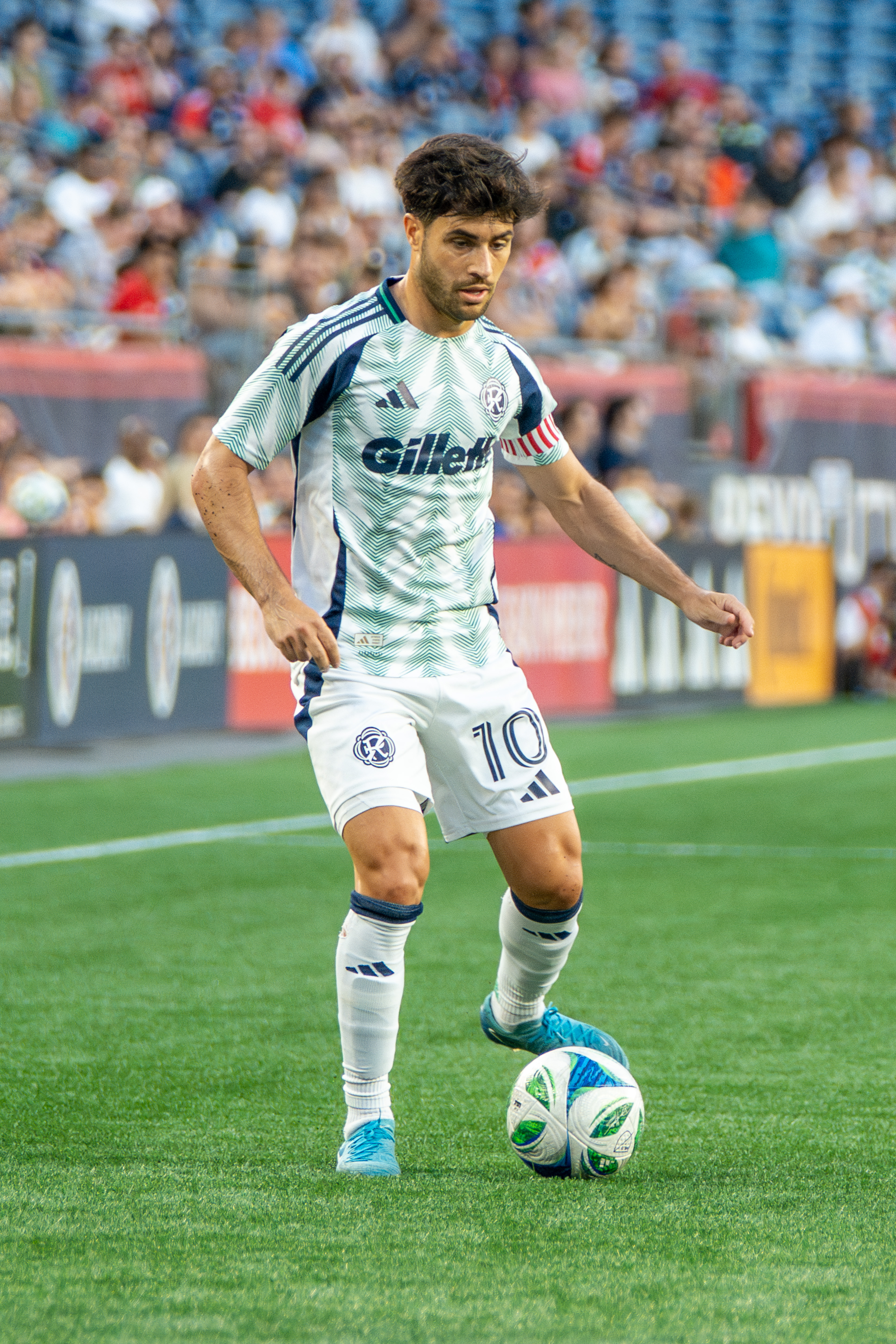
Carles Gil with the New England Revolution in 2025

On 30 January 2019, Gil joined the New England Revolution as a Designated Player on a multi-year contract, for a club record transfer fee of $2 million. He scored on his Major League Soccer debut on 2 March, the equaliser in a 1–1 draw at FC Dallas.

Gil eventually became the Revs' captain and finished his first season with ten goals and 14 assists, leading the side in scoring as they made their first playoff appearance since 2015. His play earned him several awards, including: MLS Newcomer of the Year, Midnight Riders Man of the Year, Revolution Team Most Valuable Player, Revolution Players' Player of the year and 2019 MLS Best XI.

In the 2020 campaign, Gil played only 152 minutes by late October because of injuries. He returned in time for the playoffs, scoring in wins over the Montreal Impact and Orlando City SC. Having also assisted three goals in post-season, his contract option for the following year was exercised.

Gil agreed to a further extension on 24 May 2021, until 2024; the deal increased his salary from $2.7 million to put him in the top 10 of the league's earners. In that season, he helped the Massachusetts side to the first Supporters' Shield in their 26-year history, with three games to spare. He finished as the assist leader with 18, winning the MLS Comeback Player of the Year Award while the team set a new points record with 73. He was named MLS Best XI and Revolution Team Most Valuable Player for a second time, MLS Player of the Month for June and MLS Player of the Week for matchweek 9. The playoff campaign ended in the Eastern Conference semi-finals with a penalty shootout defeat to New York City FC after a 2–2 home draw; he scored with the first attempt. On 7 December, he was named the league's Most Valuable Player.

On 31 May 2023, Gil scored the second-fastest goal in Revolution history in the 3–3 draw against Atlanta United FC. He was added to the roster for that year's MLS All-Star Game by coach Wayne Rooney. He won the Revolution Golden Boot for the second time, scoring 11 goals and recording 15 assists, also being named Players' Player of the Year for a third time and MLS Player of the Week for matchweek 16.

In March 2024, Gil agreed to an extension through 2026, with a one-year option. He was included in the MLS Team for weeks 31 and 33. In October, he was named his team's most valuable player for a club-record fourth time.

On 19 April 2025, in a 2–0 home victory over New York City, Gil set the all-time assists record for the Revolution with 74, surpassing Steve Ralston's tally. He broke Taylor Twellman's goal contributions record on 9 August, recording two assists in the 2–0 defeat of D.C. United to reach 130.

Gil scored his 50th MLS goal in his 200th game on 18 April 2026 in a 2–1 win against the Columbus Crew, being the 32nd player in the competition's history to reach 50 goals and 50 assists. On 28 October, he became the eighth player in the competition's history to record 100 regular season assists.

== International career ==
On 30 August 2013, Julen Lopetegui named Gil in the Spanish under-21 squad for 2015 UEFA European Under-21 Championship qualifiers against Austria and Albania. He made his debut against the latter on 9 September, coming on as a second-half substitute and providing an assist for Jesé's final goal in a 4–0 win in Logroño.

== Personal life ==
Gil's younger brother, Ignacio, is also a footballer and an attacking midfielder. He also came through at Valencia, and the pair were teammates at New England.

Gil is married to María. He missed his sibling's MLS debut in September 2022 due to the birth of his first child, Marco.

== Career statistics ==
As of match played 21 November 2026

Appearances and goals by club, season and competition
Club	Season	League			National cup		League cup		Continental		Other		Total	
Club	Season	Division	Apps	Goals	Apps	Goals	Apps	Goals	Apps	Goals	Apps	Goals	Apps	Goals
Valencia	2014–15	La Liga	8	1	3	0	—		—		—		11	1
Elche (loan)	2012–13	Segunda División	31	4	2	0	—		—		—		33	4
Elche (loan)	2013–14	La Liga	33	1	0	0	—		—		—		33	1
Elche (loan)	Total		64	5	2	0	0	0	0	0	0	0	66	5
Aston Villa	2014–15	Premier League	5	0	2	1	0	0	—		—		7	1
Aston Villa	2015–16	Premier League	23	2	3	0	1	0	—		—		27	2
Aston Villa	2016–17	Championship	0	0	0	0	0	0	—		—		0	0
Aston Villa	Total		28	2	5	1	1	0	0	0	0	0	34	3
Deportivo La Coruña (loan)	2016–17	La Liga	23	1	1	0	—		—		—		24	1
Deportivo La Coruña (loan)	2017–18	La Liga	10	0	1	0	—		—		—		11	0
Deportivo La Coruña (loan)	Total		33	1	2	0	0	0	0	0	0	0	45	1
Deportivo La Coruña	2018–19	Segunda División	18	0	1	0	—		—		—		19	0
New England Revolution	2019	Major League Soccer	34	10	1	0	—		—		1 (Note: Appearance(s) in MLS Cup playoffs)	0	36	10
New England Revolution	2020	Major League Soccer	6 (Note: Includes two appearances in MLS is Back Tournament group stage)	0	—		—		—		4	2	10	2
New England Revolution	2021	Major League Soccer	28	4	—		—		—		1	0	29	4
New England Revolution	2022	Major League Soccer	33	7	1	3	—		2 (Note: Appearances in CONCACAF Champions League/Cup)	0	—		36	10
New England Revolution	2023	Major League Soccer	32	11	2	0	—		—		5 (Note: Three appearances in Leagues Cup, two appearances in MLS Cup playoffs)	0	39	11
New England Revolution	2024	Major League Soccer	26	7	—		—		4	0	0	0	30	7
New England Revolution	2025	Major League Soccer	34	10	0	0	—		—		—		34	10
New England Revolution	2026	Major League Soccer	34	13	0	0	—		—		1	0	35	13
New England Revolution	Total		227	62	4	3	0	0	6	0	12	2	249	67
Career total			378	71	17	4	1	0	6	0	12	2	414	77

== Honours ==
Elche

- Segunda División: 2012–13

New England Revolution

- Supporters' Shield: 2021

Individual

- Landon Donovan MVP Award: 2021
- MLS Newcomer of the Year Award: 2019
- MLS Best XI: 2019, 2021
- MLS Player of the Month: June 2021
- MLS Comeback Player of the Year Award: 2021
- MLS All-Star Game: 2022, 2023, 2025, 2026
- Major League Soccer top assist provider: 2021
- New England Revolution MVP: 2019, 2021, 2023, 2024
- Midnight Riders Man of the Year: 2019, 2021, 2023
