= Will Sands =

American soccer player (born 2000)

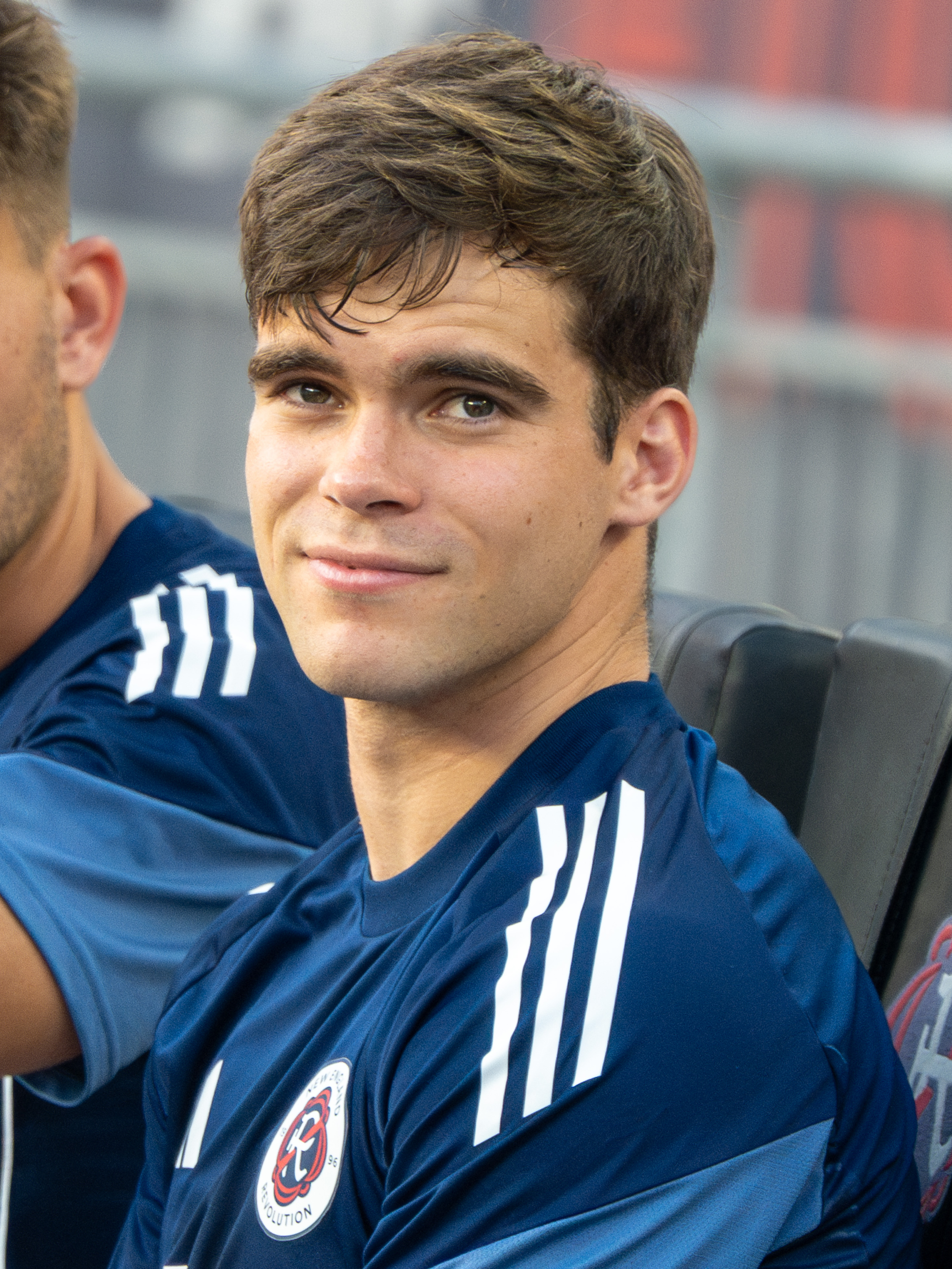
- Sands with the New England Revolution in 2025

Personal information
- Full name: William Franklin Sands
- Date of birth: July 6, 2000 (age 26)
- Place of birth: Rye, New York, U.S.
- Height: 6 ft 1 in (1.86 m)
- Positions: Defender; midfielder

Team information
- Current team: New England Revolution
- Number: 23

Youth career
- 2010–2015: New York Soccer Club
- 2015–2019: New York City FC

College career
Years	Team	Apps	(Gls)
2019–2021	Georgetown Hoyas	52	(4)

Senior career*
Years	Team	Apps	(Gls)
2021	Manhattan SC	10	(4)
2022–2024	Columbus Crew	25	(0)
2022–2024	Columbus Crew 2	6	(0)
2024–	New England Revolution	24	(1)
- * Club domestic league appearances and goals as of 22:24, 26 December 2025 (UTC)

William Franklin Sands (born July 6, 2000) is an American professional soccer player who plays for Major League Soccer club New England Revolution.

== Youth and college career ==
Sands played for New York City FC affiliate club New York Soccer Club before joining New York City FC's academy upon the creation of their U-16 Academy team in 2015. Sands was part of the New York City FC academy system from 2015 until 2019. He played college soccer at Georgetown from 2019 to 2021. During his time with the Hoyas, he made 56 appearances and scored 4 goals. He helped the team win the 2019 NCAA College Cup and two Big East Tournaments.

Sands played for Manhattan SC of USL League Two in 2021, playing in 10 games and scoring 4 goals.

== Professional career ==
On January 21, 2022, Sands was announced as a homegrown player signing by Columbus Crew after a trade with New York City FC for his homegrown rights. Sands made his professional debut for the Columbus Crew organization for the team's reserve side, Columbus Crew 2, in a 1–0 win against Philadelphia Union II. He subsequently made his first team debut in a 2–1 loss against USL Championship side Detroit City FC in the U.S. Open Cup.

On July 31, 2024, the Crew traded Sands plus $600,000 in General Allocation Money to the New England Revolution, in exchange for DeJuan Jones. He scored his first career MLS goal on April 21, 2026 in a 2-1 Revolution victory over Atlanta United.

== Personal life ==
Sands is the twin brother of James Sands, who currently plays for New York City FC, and the United States men's national soccer team. His sister Kate played soccer at Williams Ephs and Monmouth Hawks, as well working currently as Soccer coach of the Greenwich Academy women soccer team and his second sister Lizzie Sands played soccer at Bowdoin Polar Bears.

== Honors ==
Georgetown Hoyas

- NCAA College Cup: 2019

Columbus Crew

- MLS Cup: 2023
