= D.C. United–New England Revolution rivalry =

Soccer rivalry in the United States

- Other names: Acela derby
- Location: Eastern United States
- Teams: D.C. United; New England Revolution
- First meeting: April 27, 1996; MLS regular season DC 1–1 NE
- Latest meeting: August 19, 2026; MLS regular season DC 0–3 NE

Statistics
- Total meetings: 102
- Most wins: New England Revolution (40)
- All-time series: NE 40–37–25
- Regular season series: MLS: NE 36–33–23; Open Cup: NE 3–2–0
- Postseason results: DC 2–1–2
- Largest victory: DC 5–0 NE; MLS regular season (May 9, 2001)

The D.C. United–New England Revolution rivalry is a soccer rivalry between D.C. United and the New England Revolution, who both play in the Eastern Conference of Major League Soccer. The two clubs were among the 10 founding members of MLS, and began playing against each other regularly since 1996. The rivalry intensified in the mid-2000s as the two clubs were among the premier franchises in MLS, although recently it has been seen as a secondary, yet fierce rivalry, between the two clubs.

Throughout most of the rivalry's history, the series has been fairly evenly matched between the Revolution and United, with Revolution slightly leading in total all-time wins, 38 to 37. During the 1990s, D.C. United were dominate over the New England Revolution, while in the 2020s, New England were dominant over D.C. In the 2000s and 2010s the series was fairly even, while in the 2020s New England have won 12 times, including six matches from 2020 to 2021.

== History ==
=== Early years ===
D.C. United and the New England Revolution's longstanding rivalry dates back to the inception of Major League Soccer in the mid-1990s. Both the clubs were among the ten charter franchises that played in Major League Soccer during its inaugural 1996 season. The prior year to the 1996 season, both clubs were announced as franchises in MLS. D.C. United was announced on June 15, 1994, while on June 6, 1995, Robert Kraft became the founding investor/operator of the Revolution.

The two teams played their first match against one another on April 27, 1996 with the Revolution hosting United at the now-demolished Foxboro Stadium in Foxborough, Massachusetts, southwest of Boston. In front of a crowd of 32,864; the match finished tied 1–1 in regulation thanks to Raúl Díaz Arce scoring the first goal for United in the 69th minute, and Geoff Aunger scoring the match-tying goal for the Revolution in the 78th minute off of a penalty kick. At the time, regular season matches did not end in ties, henceforth the match went into a shoot-out where the Revolution won 3–2 on penalties. The return match saw United winning 3–1 against the Revolution. Ultimately throughout the 1990s, United would dominate in matches over the Revolution posting eight wins, eight draws, and two losses against New England. During the late 1990s, United would win three of the four MLS Cup titles, as well as one CONCACAF Champions Cup, one Copa Interamericana, one U.S. Open Cup, and two Supporters' Shields. New England during this time failed to qualify for the playoffs three of four years, and the one season they did reach the playoffs, they were eliminated in the first round.

=== MLS domination ===
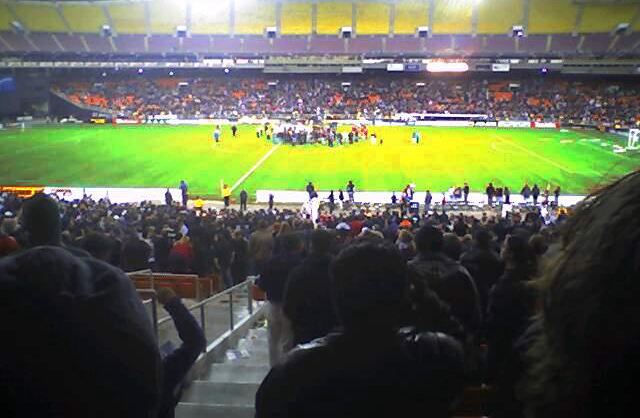
D.C. United won the 2004 Eastern Conference championship in what has been called one of the best games in MLS history.

Entering the early 2000s, the Revolution had more fortune in MLS play, in part thanks to the leadership of Steve Nicol, while United fell on harder times. During this time, the Revolution reached the 2001 U.S. Open Cup final and the 2002 MLS Cup final, losing both occasions to LA Galaxy. United meanwhile failed to qualify for the playoffs from 2000 through 2002. In 2002, New England won the Eastern Conference regular season. In the mid 2000s, both clubs routinely jockeyed with each other as the premier Eastern Conference franchise in MLS. From 2002 until 2008, one of the two squads finished in the top two of the Eastern Conference in MLS. While the rivalry was split head-to-head between United and the Revolution, United had the advantage in terms of titles and trophies collected, winning the 2004 MLS Cup final, the 2008 U.S. Open Cup final, as well as winning the Supporters' Shield in 2006 and 2007. New England during this time won their first two major trophies, claiming the 2007 U.S. Open Cup title, and the 2008 North American SuperLiga title (a predecessor to the Leagues Cup tournament).

The rivalry was emphasized when the two clubs met in the 2004 Eastern Conference championship game, and the 2006 Eastern Conference championship game. The 2004 Eastern Conference championship game has been called by pundits and American soccer journalists one of the best matches in MLS Cup Playoff history. The match ended in a 3–3 draw before United defeated the Revolution in penalty kicks. United would ultimately go on to win the 2004 MLS Cup title over Kansas City Wizards, 3–2 to win their fourth and most recent MLS Cup title. The 2004 United squad boasted by players such as Ben Olsen, Christian Gómez, Jaime Moreno, Freddy Adu, and Brian Carroll. The Revolution squad featured several notable players such as Taylor Twellman, Clint Dempsey,

From 2005 until 2008, the Revolution received the unfortunate moniker in MLS as being dubbed the "Buffalo Bills of MLS" by reaching the MLS Cup final three consecutive seasons, losing each final (2005 until 2007). Outside of MLS, the two clubs played periodically in the CONCACAF Champions Cup due to their success in MLS play. However, neither club met in the Champions Cup, and the best performances by each side included a quarterfinal run by the Revolution in 2006, and a semifinal run by United in 2007.

By the late 2000s entering the 2010s, both clubs' domination in the East came to a relative end, as United missed the playoffs five times from 2008 through 2014, while the Revolution missed the playoffs three consecutive seasons (2010 to 2012).

=== Recent years ===
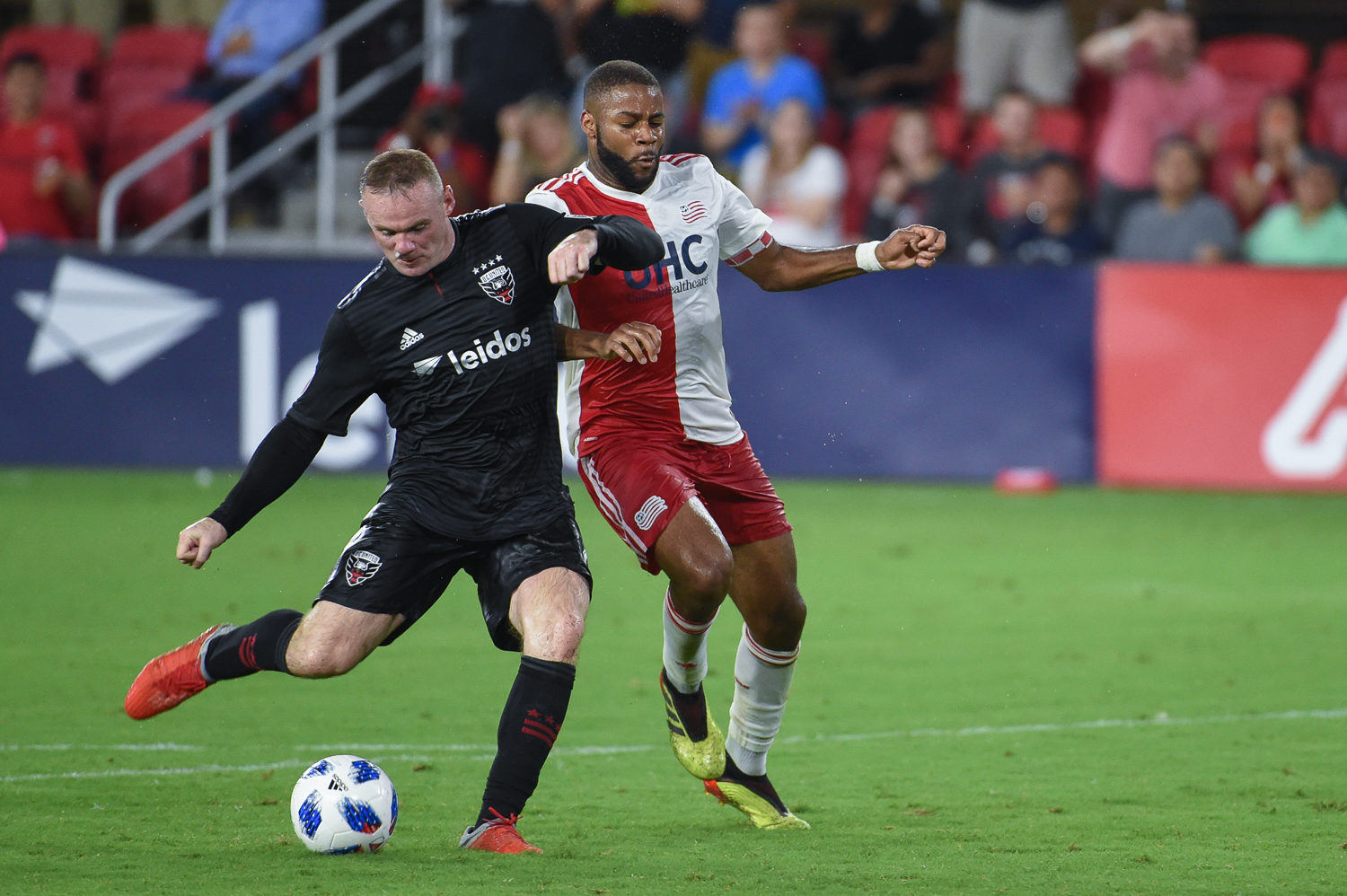
Wayne Rooney of D.C. United and Andrew Farrell of New England Revolution battling for possession during a 2018 MLS match.

Since the mid-2010s, both clubs have been less competitive in Major League Soccer play, with only one major title shared between the two clubs since 2015 (New England's 2021 Shield). Despite this, pundits and players have emphasized the importance of the matches between the two sides given the rivalry's history, and the clubs routinely jockeying for wild-card berths in the MLS Cup Playoffs.

Despite the lesser successes by both sides in the late 2010s, the clubs maintained to achieve national and international soccer headlines during this time. In 2018, United opened their new soccer-specific stadium, Audi Field, making New England the final original MLS franchise to not play in a soccer-specific stadium. Additionally, United welcomed the signing of English international star, Wayne Rooney as a Designated Player. Around the same time, New England signed formed D.C. United and U.S. national team manager, Bruce Arena as their head coach.

During the 2021 season, New England set a club record with their best regular season, led by the likes of Adam Buksa, Gustavo Bou, Tajon Buchanan, and Matt Turner.

Into the early 2020s, the clubs made news for exporting several of their stars to Europe. New England set a transfer record selling Buchanan to Club Brugge, Buksa to Lens of the French Ligue 1, as well as Turner to Arsenal in the Premier League. United meanwhile sold academy product Kevin Paredes to Wolfsburg of the German Bundesliga.

In 2024, D.C. United did the double over New England for the first time since 2012.

== Results ==
D.C. United win New England win Draw

D.C. United vs. New England Revolution season-by-season results
1990s (United, 8–2–8)

No	Date	Venue	Home	Score	Away	Competition	Attendance	DC scorers	NE scorers	Overall record	Ref
1	April 27, 1996	Foxboro Stadium	New England	1–1 (Note: From 1996 until 1999, no matches ended in ties and went to a shoot-out, for statistical purposes and IFAB/FIFA laws, matches that are decided through a penalty shoot-out are counted as draws for record-keeping.)	D.C. United	1996 MLS season	32,864	Díaz Arce	Aunger	Tied 0–0–1	
2	June 30, 1996	RFK Memorial Stadium	D.C. United	3–1	New England	1996 MLS season	19,355	Rammel, Díaz Arce, J. Harkes	Naveda	D.C. United 1–0–1	
3	July 20, 1996	Foxboro Stadium	New England	2–0	D.C. United	1996 MLS season	18,347	—	Sawatzky (2)	Tied 1–1–1	
4	September 17, 1996	RFK Memorial Stadium	D.C. United	3–2	New England	1996 MLS season	7,360	Pope, Díaz Arce (2)	Moore (2)	D.C. United 2–1–1	
5	May 18, 1997	Foxboro Stadium	New England	0–0	D.C. United	1997 MLS season	15,109	—	—	D.C. United 2–1–2	
6	June 14, 1997	Foxboro Stadium	New England	0–1	D.C. United	1997 MLS season	26,313	Sanneh	—	D.C. United 3–1–2	
7	August 27, 1997	RFK Memorial Stadium	D.C. United	3–2	New England	1997 MLS season	9,675	Etcheverry, J. Moreno, Díaz Arce	Baba, McKinley	D.C. United 4–1–2	
8	September 16, 1997	RFK Memorial Stadium	D.C. United	2–2	New England	1997 MLS season	11,607	Moore (o.g.), J. Harkes	Moore (2)	D.C. United 4–1–3	
9	October 5, 1997	RFK Memorial Stadium	D.C. United	4–1	New England	1997 MLS Cup Playoffs	12,540	Wegerle (2), Moreno (2)	Burns	D.C. United 5–1–3	
10	October 8, 1997	Foxboro Stadium	New England	1–1	D.C. United	1997 MLS Cup Playoffs	16,233	Williams	Moore	D.C. United 5–1–4	
11	March 29, 1998	RFK Memorial Stadium	D.C. United	1–1	New England	1998 MLS season	22,263	Kamler	Baba	D.C. United 5–1–5	
12	April 18, 1998	Foxboro Stadium	New England	1–1	D.C. United	1998 MLS season	24,133	Etcheverry	Jair	D.C. United 5–1–6	
13	May 13, 1998	RFK Memorial Stadium	D.C. United	3–2	New England	1998 MLS season	14,442	Olsen, Sanneh, Lassiter	Jair, Chronopoulos	D.C. United 6–1–6	
14	July 15, 1998	Foxboro Stadium	New England	0–1	D.C. United	1998 MLS season	17,206	Lassiter	—	D.C. United 7–1–6	
15	April 10, 1999	Foxboro Stadium	New England	2–2	D.C. United	1999 MLS season	18,373	Aunger, Lassiter	Moore, Torres	D.C. United 7–1–7	
16	April 24, 1999	Foxboro Stadium	New England	3–2	D.C. United	1999 MLS season	15,132	Lassiter, Wood	McKinley (2), Savarese	D.C. United 7–2–7	
17	July 25, 1999	Foxboro Stadium	New England	0–2	D.C. United	1999 MLS season	15,132	Lassiter, Talley	—	D.C. United 8–2–7	
18	October 9, 1999	RFK Memorial Stadium	D.C. United	1–1	New England	1999 MLS season	20,695	Álvarez (o.g.)	Moore	D.C. United 8–2–8	

2000s (Revolution, 16–15–9)

No	Date	Venue	Home	Score	Away	Competition	Attendance	DC scorers	NE scorers	Overall record	Ref
19	April 15, 2000	Foxboro Stadium	New England	2–1	D.C. United	2000 MLS season	15,174	J. Moreno	Baba (2)	D.C. United 8–3–8	
20	May 13, 2000	RFK Memorial Stadium	D.C. United	1–3	New England	2000 MLS season	18,493	J. Moreno	Harris, M. Ramos, Baba	D.C. United 8–4–8	
21	August 30, 2000	Foxboro Stadium	New England	1–0	D.C. United	2000 MLS season	15,489	—	J. Morales	D.C. United 8–5–8	
22	September 3, 2000	RFK Memorial Stadium	D.C. United	2–0	New England	2000 MLS season	51,996 (Note: Highest attended match in the rivalry's history.)	Marino (2)	—	D.C. United 9–5–8	
23	April 21, 2001	RFK Memorial Stadium	D.C. United	2–1	New England	2001 MLS season	15,656	Conteh (2)	Okoh	D.C. United 10–5–8	
24	May 9, 2001	RFK Memorial Stadium	D.C. United	5–0	New England	2001 MLS season	10,638	Conteh (4) (Note: First hat-trick scored in rivalry's history.), Talley	—	D.C. United 11–5–8	
25	July 14, 2001	Foxboro Stadium	New England	1–3	D.C. United	2001 MLS season	14,691	Quaranta (2), J. Moreno	Sunsing	D.C. United 12–5–8	
26	August 18, 2001	Foxboro Stadium	New England	2–1	D.C. United	2001 MLS season	15,226	Armstrong	Chronopoulos (2)	D.C. United 12–6–8	
27	August 22, 2001	Foxboro Stadium	New England	2–0	D.C. United	2001 U.S. Open Cup	7,128	—	Williams (2)	D.C. United 12–7–8	
28	June 8, 2002	RFK Memorial Stadium	D.C. United	3–2	New England	2002 MLS season	12,988	Nelsen (2), Quaranta	Twellman (2)	D.C. United 13–7–8	
29	July 6, 2002	Gillette Stadium	New England	2–0	D.C. United	2002 MLS season	9,747	—	Kamler, Twellman	D.C. United 13–8–8	
30	July 27, 2002	RFK Memorial Stadium	D.C. United	0–1	New England	2002 MLS season	24,240	—	Heaps	D.C. United 13–9–8	
31	September 7, 2002	Gillette Stadium	New England	3–0	D.C. United	2002 MLS season	15,748	—	Twellman (3) (Note: First hat-trick scored by a New England player in rivalry's history.)	D.C. United 13–10–8	
32	June 21, 2003	RFK Memorial Stadium	D.C. United	1–1	New England	2003 MLS season	11,022	Stoichkov	Kamler	D.C. United 13–10–9	
33	July 27, 2003	Gillette Stadium	New England	2–4	D.C. United	2003 MLS season	30,912	Quintanilla (2), Kovalenko, Eskandarian	Twellman (2)	D.C. United 14–10–9	
34	August 9, 2003	RFK Memorial Stadium	D.C. United	1–0	New England	2003 MLS season	14,374	Kovalenko	—	D.C. United 15–10–9	
35	October 11, 2003	Gillette Stadium	New England	1–0	D.C. United	2003 MLS season	12,006	—	Ralston	D.C. United 15–11–9	
36	May 29, 2004	Gillette Stadium	New England	0–1	D.C. United	2004 MLS season	19,314	Kamler (o.g.)	—	D.C. United 16–11–9	
37	August 14, 2004	RFK Memorial Stadium	D.C. United	2–2	New England	2004 MLS season	13,298	J. Moreno (2)	Ralston, Dorman	D.C. United 16–11–10	
38	August 28, 2004	Gillette Stadium	New England	0–0	D.C. United	2004 MLS season	17,236	—	—	D.C. United 16–11–11	
39	October 9, 2004	RFK Memorial Stadium	D.C. United	1–0	New England	2004 MLS season	19,461	Gómez	—	D.C. United 17–11–11	
40	November 6, 2004	RFK Memorial Stadium	D.C. United	3–3 (Note: D.C. United won 4–3 on penalties.)	New England	2004 MLS Cup Playoffs (Note: 2004 MLS Eastern Conference final.)	21,201	Eskandarian, J. Moreno, Gómez	Twellman, Ralston, Noonan	D.C. United 17–11–12	
41	April 23, 2005	RFK Memorial Stadium	D.C. United	3–4	New England	2005 MLS season	13,691	J. Moreno (2), Quaranta	Twellman, Joseph, Leonard, Dempsey	D.C. United 17–12–12	
42	May 14, 2005	Gillette Stadium	New England	1–0	D.C. United	2005 MLS season	13,662	—	Twellman	D.C. United 17–13–12	
43	June 18, 2005	RFK Memorial Stadium	D.C. United	2–0	New England	2005 MLS season	17,611	Quaranta, Moreno	—	D.C. United 18–13–12	
44	August 27, 2005	Gillette Stadium	New England	2–1	D.C. United	2005 MLS season	18,049	Quaranta	Boswell (o.g.), Twellman	D.C. United 18–14–12	
45	June 3, 2006	RFK Memorial Stadium	D.C. United	1–0	New England	2006 MLS season	22,686	Moreno	—	D.C. United 19–14–12	
46	June 17, 2006	Gillette Stadium	New England	1–1	D.C. United	2006 MLS season	16,209	Moreno	Dorman	D.C. United 19–14–13	
47	September 13, 2006	Gillette Stadium	New England	1–1	D.C. United	2006 MLS season	6,285	Gros	Dempsey	D.C. United 19–14–14	
48	October 7, 2006	RFK Memorial Stadium	D.C. United	1–2	New England	2006 MLS season	21,022	Gómez	Dempsey, Twellman	D.C. United 19–15–14	
49	November 5, 2006	RFK Memorial Stadium	D.C. United	0–1	New England	2006 MLS Cup Playoffs (Note: 2006 MLS Eastern Conference final.)	19,552	—	Twellman	D.C. United 19–16–14	
50	May 3, 2007	RFK Memorial Stadium	D.C. United	1–1	New England	2007 MLS season	12,908	Moreno	Dorman	D.C. United 19–16–15	
51	August 5, 2007	Gillette Stadium	New England	0–3	D.C. United	2007 MLS season	12,618	Gros, Emílio (2)	—	D.C. United 20–16–15	
52	September 9, 2007	RFK Memorial Stadium	D.C. United	4–2	New England	2007 MLS season	18,918	Fred, Moreno, Emílio (2)	Twellman, Heaps	D.C. United 21–16–15	
53	May 29, 2008	Gillette Stadium	New England	2–2	D.C. United	2008 MLS season	8,159	Emílio, Fred	Cristman, Dube	D.C. United 21–16–16	
54	August 12, 2008	RFK Memorial Stadium	D.C. United	3–1	New England	2008 U.S. Open Cup	6,797	Emílio (2), Quaranta	Germanese	D.C. United 22–16–16	
55	August 20, 2008	Gillette Stadium	New England	2–1	D.C. United	2008 MLS season	14,962	Moreno	Twellman, Larentowicz	D.C. United 22–17–16	
56	October 16, 2008	RFK Memorial Stadium	D.C. United	2–1	New England	2008 MLS season	16,672	Doe (2)	Twellman	D.C. United 23–17–16	
57	April 17, 2009	RFK Memorial Stadium	D.C. United	1–1	New England	2009 MLS season	14,441	Olsen	Joseph	D.C. United 23–17–17	
58	May 30, 2009	Gillette Stadium	New England	2–1	D.C. United	2009 MLS season	15,271	Ralston	Fred	D.C. United 23–18–17	

2010s (United, 11–10–6)

No	Date	Venue	Home	Score	Away	Competition	Attendance	DC scorers	NE scorers	Overall record	Ref
59	April 3, 2010	RFK Memorial Stadium	D.C. United	0–2	New England	2010 MLS season	20,664	—	Mansally (2)	D.C. United 23–19–17	
60	August 7, 2010	Gillette Stadium	New England	1–0	D.C. United	2010 MLS season	12,218	—	Phelan	D.C. United 23–20–17	
61	March 26, 2011	Gillette Stadium	New England	2–1	D.C. United	2011 MLS season	12,914	Davies	Schilawski, Joseph	D.C. United 23–21–17	
62	April 26, 2011	Maryland SoccerPlex	D.C. United	2–3	New England	2011 U.S. Open Cup	1,802	Bošković (2)	Dube (2), Koger	D.C. United 23–22–17	
63	July 20, 2011	RFK Memorial Stadium	D.C. United	0–1	New England	2011 MLS season	16,597	—	McCarthy	Tied 23–23–17	
64	April 14, 2012	Gillette Stadium	New England	1–2	D.C. United	2012 MLS season	10,389	Santos, Pontius	P. Moreno	D.C. United 24–23–17	
65	May 26, 2012	RFK Memorial Stadium	D.C. United	3–2	New England	2012 MLS season	14,627	McDonald, Jakovic, Santos	Sène, Soares	D.C. United 25–23–17	
66	September 15, 2012	RFK Memorial Stadium	D.C. United	2–1	New England	2012 MLS season	15,104	Pontius, Neal	Rowe	D.C. United 26–23–17	
67	June 8, 2013	Gillette Stadium	New England	0–0	D.C. United	2013 MLS season	14,163	—	—	D.C. United 26–23–18	
68	June 26, 2013	Maryland SoccerPlex	D.C. United	3–1	New England	2013 U.S. Open Cup	2,918	Pontius, De Rosario, Pajoy	Toja	D.C. United 27–23–18	
69	July 27, 2013	RFK Memorial Stadium	D.C. United	1–2	New England	2013 MLS season	14,122	Silva	Imbongo, Fagúndez	D.C. United 27–24–18	
70	September 21, 2013	Gillette Stadium	New England	2–1	D.C. United	2013 MLS season	19,187	Caldwell (o.g.)	Fagundez, Nguyen	D.C. United 27–25–18	
71	April 5, 2014	RFK Memorial Stadium	D.C. United	2–0	New England	2014 MLS season	10,526	Gonçalves (o.g.), Rolfe	—	D.C. United 28–25–18	
72	May 24, 2014	Gillette Stadium	New England	2–1	D.C. United	2014 MLS season	13,589	Espíndola	Mullins, Fagúndez	D.C. United 28–26–18	
73	May 23, 2015	Gillette Stadium	New England	1–1	D.C. United	2015 MLS season	15,216	Arrieta	Davies	D.C. United 28–26–19	
74	June 21, 2015	RFK Memorial Stadium	D.C. United	2–1	New England	2015 MLS season	17,213	Rolfe (2)	Davies	D.C. United 29–26–19	
75	October 28, 2015	RFK Memorial Stadium	D.C. United	2–1	New England	2015 MLS Cup Playoffs	11,554	Pontius, Rolfe	Agudelo	D.C. United 30–26–19	
76	March 12, 2016	Gillette Stadium	New England	0–0	D.C. United	2016 MLS season	16,102	—	—	D.C. United 30–26–20	
77	April 23, 2016	RFK Memorial Stadium	D.C. United	3–0	New England	2016 MLS season	16,005	Neagle, Acosta, Saborío	—	D.C. United 31–26–20	
78	June 25, 2016	RFK Memorial Stadium	D.C. United	2–0	New England	2016 MLS season	16,051	Franklin, Espíndola	—	D.C. United 32–26–20	
79	April 27, 2017	Gillette Stadium	New England	2–2	D.C. United	2017 MLS season	16,591	Jeffrey, Le Toux	Nguyen, Agudelo	D.C. United 32–26–21	
80	June 28, 2017	Jordan Field	New England	2–1	D.C. United	2017 U.S. Open Cup	2,572	Ortiz	Fagundez, Wright	D.C. United 32–27–21	
81	August 16, 2017	RFK Memorial Stadium	D.C. United	1–0	New England	2017 MLS season	15,539	Acosta	—	D.C. United 33–27–21	
82	June 30, 2018	Gillette Stadium	New England	3–2	D.C. United	2018 MLS season	19,371	Asad (2)	Penilla (2), Bunbury	D.C. United 33–28–21	
83	August 19, 2018	Audi Field	D.C. United	2–0	New England	2018 MLS season	20,198	Acosta, Stieber	—	D.C. United 34–28–21	
84	May 25, 2019	Gillette Stadium	New England	1–1	D.C. United	2019 MLS season	20,131	Rooney	Agudelo	D.C. United 34–28–22	
85	July 12, 2019	Audi Field	D.C. United	2–2	New England	2019 MLS season	18,903	Jara, Amarikwa	Bunbury, Gil	D.C. United 34–28–23	

2020s (Revolution, 12–3–2)

No	Date	Venue	Home	Score	Away	Competition	Attendance	DC scorers	NE scorers	Overall record	Ref
86	July 17, 2020	Marathon Sports Field (Note: Soccer field part of the ESPN Wide World of Sports Complex near Orlando, Florida.)	D.C. United (Note: D.C. United was designated as the home team for this neutral venue match.)	1–1	New England	MLS is Back Tournament (Note: Match counted towards the 2020 MLS regular season standings.)	0 (Note: Match was played behind closed doors due to local regulations pertaining to the COVID-19 pandemic.)	Higuaín	Buksa	D.C. United 34–28–24	
87	August 25, 2020	Audi Field	D.C. United	1–2	New England	2020 MLS season	0	Kamara	Bou, Bunbury	D.C. United 34–29–24	
88	September 27, 2020	Audi Field	D.C. United	0–2	New England	2020 MLS season	0	—	Bou, Buksa	D.C. United 34–30–24	
89	November 1, 2020	Gillette Stadium	New England	4–3	D.C. United	2020 MLS season	0	Asad, Yow, Rivas	Buksa, Canouse (o.g.), Bunbury (2)	D.C. United 34–31–24	
90	April 24, 2021	Gillette Stadium	New England	1–0	D.C. United	2021 MLS season	8,000 (Note: Match was played at 12% stadium capacity due to local regulations pertaining to the COVID-19 pandemic.)	—	Hines-Ike (o.g.)	D.C. United 34–32–24	
91	August 18, 2021	Gillette Stadium	New England	3–2	D.C. United	2021 MLS season	11,419	Arriola, Ábila	McNamara, Buchanan, Jones	D.C. United 34–33–24	
92	October 20, 2021	Audi Field	D.C. United	2–3	New England	2021 MLS season	13,387	Robertha, Ábila	Buksa	Tied 34–34–24	
93	April 23, 2022	Audi Field	D.C. United	3–2	New England	2022 MLS season	17,131	Fountas (2), Estrada	Bye, Buksa	D.C. United 35–34–24	
94	August 13, 2022	Gillette Stadium	New England	1–0	D.C. United	2022 MLS season	24,240	—	Gil	Tied 35–35–24	
95	March 25, 2023	Audi Field	D.C. United	1–2	New England	2023 MLS season	16,509	Benteke	Bou, Buck	New England 36–35–24	
96	July 15, 2023	Gillette Stadium	New England	4–0	D.C. United	2023 MLS season	29,884	—	Bou, I. Harkes (2), Hines-Ike (o.g.)	New England 37–35–24	
97	February 24, 2024	Audi Field	D.C. United	3–1	New England	2024 MLS season	19,215	Benteke (3)	Gil	New England 37–36–24	
98	October 5, 2024	Gillette Stadium	New England	1–2	D.C. United	2024 MLS season	44,110	Santos, Benteke	Peltola (o.g.)	Tied 37–37–24	
99	May 28, 2025	Audi Field	D.C. United	1–1	New England	2025 MLS season	10,645	Pirani	Feingold	Tied 37–37–25	
100	August 9, 2025	Gillette Stadium	New England	2–0	D.C. United	2025 MLS season	21,538	—	Campana, Gil	New England 38–37–25	
101	April 11, 2026	Gillette Stadium	New England	1–0	D.C. United	2026 MLS season	15,454	—	Yusuf	New England 39–37–25	
102	August 19, 2026	Audi Field	D.C. United	0–3	New England	2026 MLS season	13,848	—	Yusuf (3)	New England 40–37–25	

== Players and transfers ==
=== D.C., then New England ===
- Chris Albright
- Emmanuel Boateng
- Blake Brettschneider
- Jeff Causey
- Charlie Davies
- Raúl Díaz Arce
- Earl Edwards Jr.
- Mario Gori
- Ian Harkes
- John Harkes
- Erik Imler
- Brian Kamler
- Daouda Kanté
- Kris Kelderman
- Carlos Llamosa
- Jason Moore
- Clyde Simms
- Doug Warren

=== New England, then D.C. ===
- Geoff Aunger
- Adam Cristman
- Raúl Díaz Arce
- Avery John
- Ivan McKinley
- Patrick Mullins
- Sainey Nyassi
- James Riley
- Mark Watson
- John Wilson

== Statistics ==
=== Summary ===
As of August 19, 2026

Competition	Matches	DC wins	DC goals	Draws	NE wins	NE goals
Major League Soccer	91	33	128	22	36	125
MLS Cup playoffs	5	2	10	2	1	7
U.S. Open Cup	5	2	9	0	3	9
MLS is Back Tournament	1	0	1	1	0	1
Total	102	37	148	25	40	142

=== Honors ===
With 13 major honors, D.C. United have won more major competitions than any other Major League Soccer club, and are tied for the most of any North American soccer franchise ever. D.C. United won their first major title in 1996, winning the 1996 MLS Cup championship. Since then, they have claimed three additional MLS Cups (league championship), four Supporters' Shields (league premiership), three U.S. Open Cups (national championship) and one CONCACAF Champions Cup title (continental championship). In addition, United won the 1998 Copa Interamericana, an infrequently-held and now-defunct super cup between the champions of CONCACAF and CONMEBOL. Of the original MLS franchises, New York was the last to have won its first major honor, capturing their first Supporters' Shield in 2013.

As of January 22, 2023

Competition	D.C. United		New England	
Competition	Titles	Last won	Titles	Last won
MLS Cup	4	2004	0	—
Supporters' Shield	4	2007	1	2021
U.S. Open Cup	3	2013	1	2007
Eastern Conference regular season	6	2014	3	2021
Eastern Conference post-season	5	2004	5	2014
CONCACAF Champions Cup (Note: Known as the CONCACAF Champions League from 2008 to 2023.)	1	1998	0	—
Leagues Cup (Note: Includes the North American SuperLiga that was played from 2007 to 2011.)	0	—	1	2008
Copa Interamericana	1	1998	0	—
FIFA Club World Cup	0	—	0	—
Total	24	2014	11	2021

=== Eastern Conference standings finishes ===
D.C. United New England Revolution

P.	1996	1997	1998	1999	2000	2001	2002	2003	2004	2005	2006	2007	2008	2009	2010	2011	2012	2013	2014	2015	2016	2017	2018	2019	2020	2021	2022	2023	2024	2025	2026
1		1	1	1			1			1	1	1							1							1					
2	2				2			2	2	2	2	2					2		2												
3						3							3	3				3													3
4		4			4	4		4	4					4						4	4		4								
5	5			5			5													5				5				5			
6			6										6																		
7															7	7					7	7		7							
8															8								8		8	8					
9																9	9														
10																		10									10		10		
11																						11								11	
12																												12			
13																									13						
14																											14		14		14
15																														15	

• Total: D.C. United with 15 higher finishes, New England Revolution with 16 higher finishes.

== See also ==
- I-95 derbies
