= Tomás Chancalay =

Argentine footballer (born 1999)

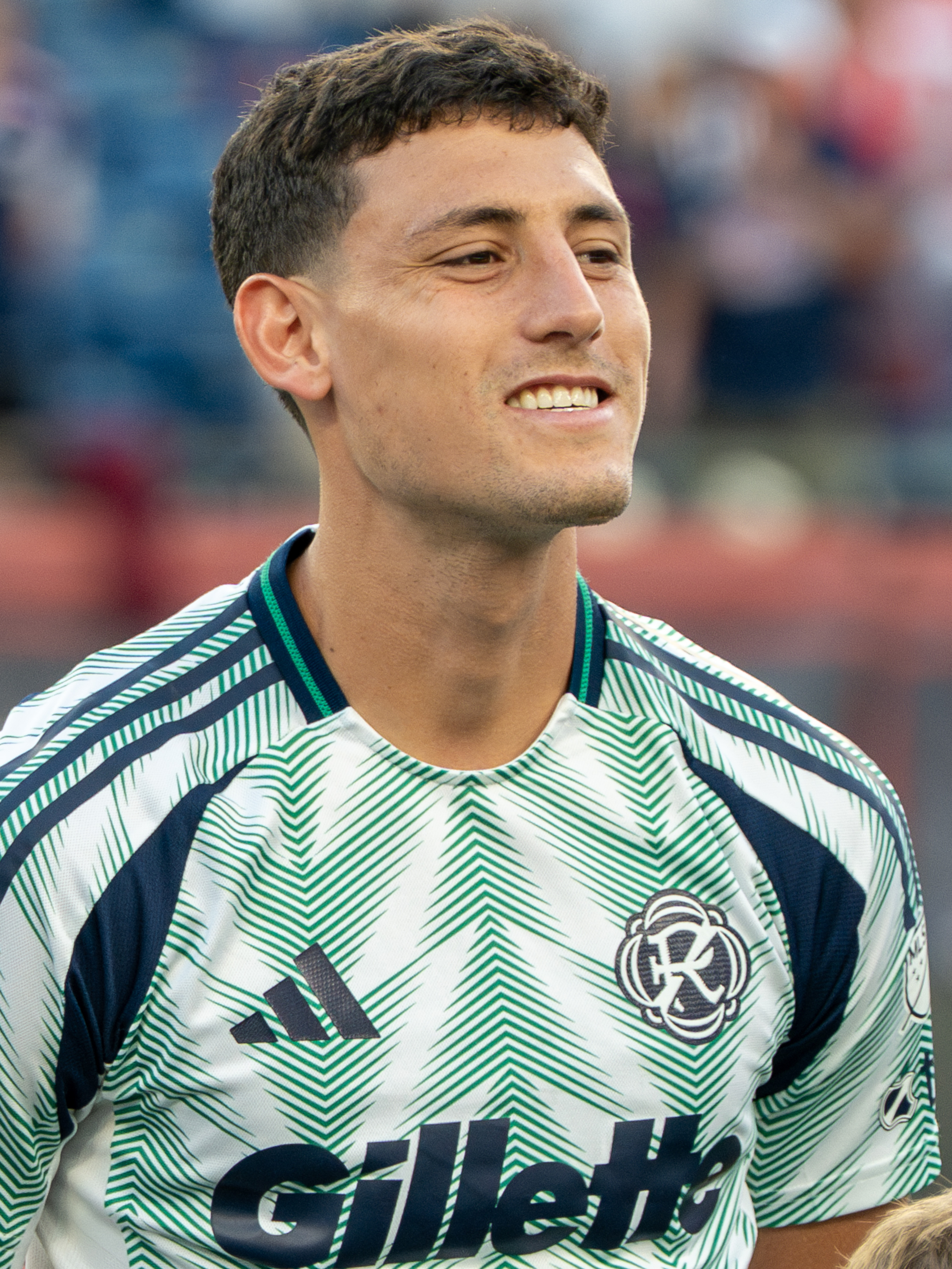
- Chancalay with the New England Revolution in 2025

Personal information
- Full name: Tomás Alejandro Chancalay
- Date of birth: 1 January 1999 (age 27)
- Place of birth: Viale, Argentina
- Height: 1.79 m (5 ft 10 in)
- Position: Winger

Team information
- Current team: Minnesota United
- Number: 8

Youth career
- Arsenal de Viale
- 2006–2017: Colón

Senior career*
Years	Team	Apps	(Gls)
2017–2021	Colón	66	(5)
2021	→ Racing Club (loan)	39	(7)
2022–2023	Racing Club	25	(3)
2022–2023	→ Al-Wasl (loan)	20	(9)
2023	→ New England Revolution (loan)	11	(6)
2023	→ New England Revolution II (loan)	1	(0)
2024–2025	New England Revolution	38	(6)
2026–	Minnesota United	9	(1)

International career^{‡}
2018–2019	Argentina U20	6	(1)
- * Club domestic league appearances and goals as of 27 December 2025 ‡ National team caps and goals as of 4 June 2019

Tomás Alejandro Chancalay (born 1 January 1999) is an Argentine professional footballer who plays as a winger for Major League Soccer club Minnesota United.

== Club career ==
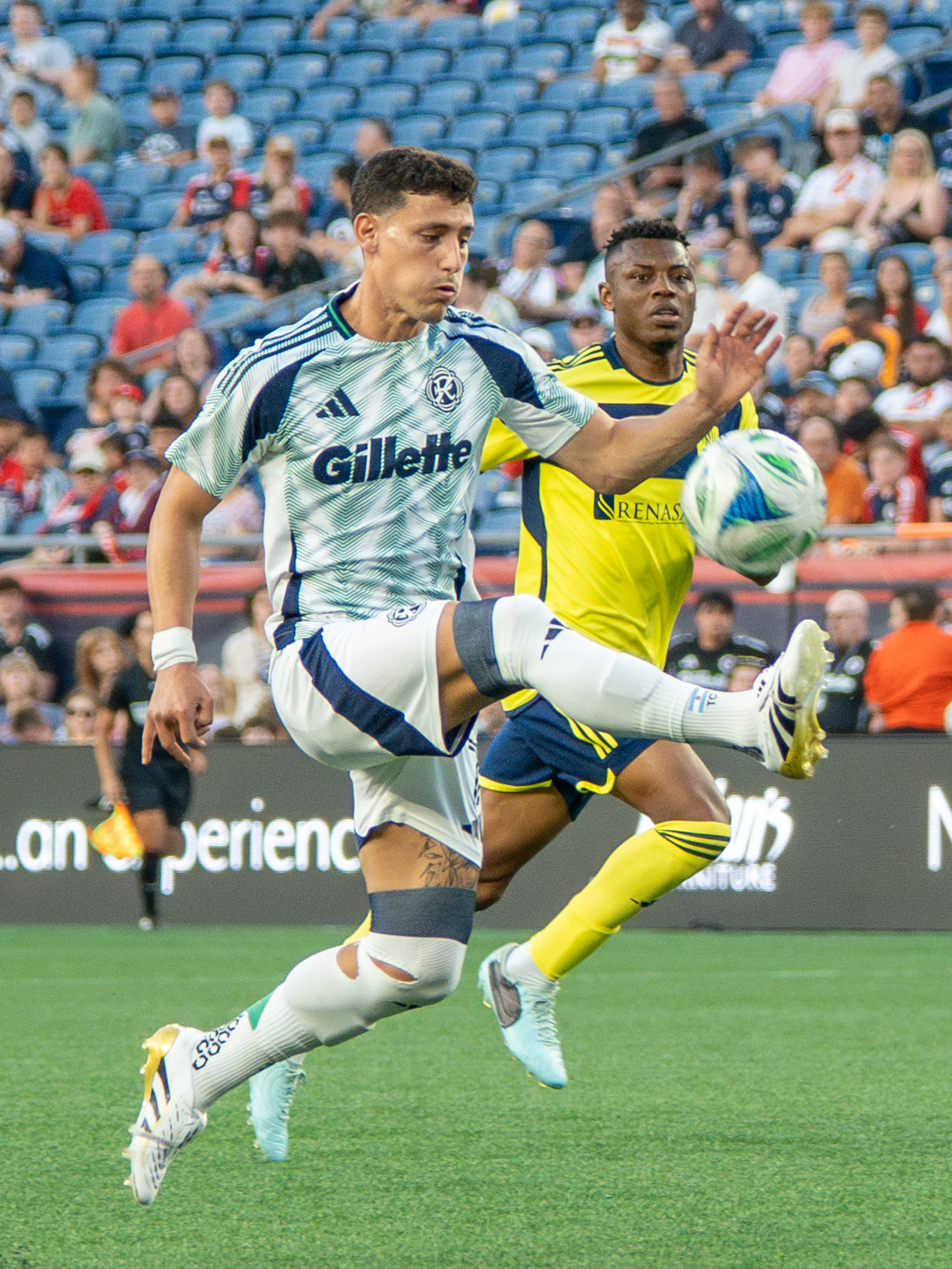
Chancalay with the NE Revolution in 2025

Born in Viale, Entre Ríos, Chancalay joined Colón's youth setup in 2006, from hometown side Arsenal de Viale. On 10 February 2017, he signed his first professional contract with the club.

Promoted to the first team ahead of the 2017–18 campaign, Chancalay made his professional – and Primera División – debut on 26 August 2017, coming on as a second-half substitute for Nicolás Leguizamón in a 1–1 away draw against Rosario Central. In his next appearance on 8 September, he scored his first senior goal as Colón beat Arsenal de Sarandí away from home. He netted further goals against San Martín and Godoy Cruz in twenty-four total appearances in his first season, as Colón qualified for the 2018 Copa Sudamericana.

On 5 February 2021, Chancalay moved to Primera División side Racing, on a loan deal for the rest of the year, including a purchase option. Racing paid a fee of around 100,000 US dollars for the loan deal. On 14 January 2022, Racing triggered the purchase option, buying 50% of Cahncalay's pass for 1,250,000 dollars. The player signed a deal until the end of 2024. On 7 September 2022, Chancalay left Racing to join Emirati side Al-Wasl on a loan deal until June 2023.

On 10 July 2023, Chancalay joined Major League Soccer club New England Revolution on loan for the remainder of the 2023 season. The deal included a purchase option, and an option to extend the loan through the 2024 season. He played his first minutes for the Revolution on August 13 as part of the club's academy side, New England Revolution II, but departed the match after 20 minutes with a thigh contusion.

On 2 September 2023, Chancalay scored 2 goals for the Revolution against Austin FC.

On 28 November 2023, Chancalay was permanently transferred from Racing to New England Revolution as a Designated Player, with a contract through the 2026 MLS season with an additional one-year club option. His transfer fee was reportedly $3.1 million, including a 25% sell-on fee.

On 7 May 2025, Chancalay scored the first-ever goal in Centreville Bank Stadium history, in the Revolution's 2–1 2025 U.S. Open Cup victory over Rhode Island FC.

Minnesota United announced they had signed Chancalay from New England Revolution on the 26th of December 2025. They paid $100,000, signing him through to the 2027/28 season with an option for 2028/29.

== International career ==
Chancalay was selected by the Argentina under-20s for the 2018 L'Alcúdia International Football Tournament, but was later removed after Colón chose to withdraw him. He had previously trained with the U20s, including against the full side at the 2018 FIFA World Cup. Chancalay was called up by Fernando Batista for the 2019 FIFA U-20 World Cup. He appeared in two matches at the tournament in Poland, as Argentina were eliminated by Mali on penalties after Chancalay missed the decisive spot-kick.

== Career statistics ==
=== Club ===
As of 25 May 2024

Appearances and goals by club, season and competition
Club	Season	League			National cup		League cup		Continental		Other		Total	
Club	Season	Division	Apps	Goals	Apps	Goals	Apps	Goals	Apps	Goals	Apps	Goals	Apps	Goals
Colón	2017–18	Argentine Primera División	24	3	0	0	—		—		—		24	3
Colón	2018–19	Argentine Primera División	16	2	1	0	1	0	4 (Note: Appearance(s) in Copa Sudamericana)	0	—		22	2
Colón	2019–20	Argentine Primera División	17	0	2	1	1	1	6	1	—		17	0
Colón	2020–21	Argentine Primera División	9	0	1	0	—		—		—		9	0
Colón	Total		66	5	4	1	2	1	10	1	—		82	8
Racing (loan)	2021	Argentine Primera División	39	7	3	0	—		6 (Note: Appearances in Copa Libertadores)	5	1 (Note: Appearances in Supercopa Argentina)	0	49	12
Racing	2022	Argentine Primera División	25	3	2	1	—		4	1	—		31	5
Racing	Total		64	10	5	1	—		10	6	1	0	80	17
Al Wasl (loan)	2022–23	UAE Pro League	20	9	5	2	2	1	—		—		27	12
New England Revolution (loan)	2023	MLS	11	6	—		2	0	—		—		13	6
New England Revolution II (loan)	2023	MLS Next Pro	1	0	—		—		—		—		1	0
New England Revolution	2024	MLS	12	2	—		—		6 (Note: Appearance(s) in CONCACAF Champions Cup)	4	—		18	6
New England Revolution	2025	MLS	26	4	—		—		—		—		26	4
New England Revolution	Total		38	6	0	0	0	0	6	4	0	0	44	10
Career total			200	36	14	4	6	2	26	11	1	0	247	53
