= Jack Panayotou =

American soccer player (born 2004)

Personal information
- Full name: Jack Michael Panayotou
- Date of birth: June 5, 2004 (age 22)
- Place of birth: Cambridge, Massachusetts, United States
- Height: 5 ft 9 in (1.75 m)
- Position: Winger

Team information
- Current team: Loudoun United (on loan from New England Revolution)

Youth career
- 2019–2022: New England Revolution

College career
Years	Team	Apps	(Gls)
2022	Georgetown Hoyas	19	(7)

Senior career*
Years	Team	Apps	(Gls)
2022–2025	New England Revolution II	26	(10)
2023–	New England Revolution	17	(0)
2024	→ Rhode Island FC (loan)	12	(0)
2025	→ Hartford Athletic (loan)	12	(3)
2026–	→ Loudoun United (loan)	13	(0)

International career^{‡}
2022	United States U17	1	(0)
2022	United States U19	3	(0)
2023–	United States U23	5	(0)
- * Club domestic league appearances and goals as of November 7, 2026 ‡ National team caps and goals as of April 10, 2023

Jack Michael Panayotou (born June 5, 2004) is an American professional soccer player who plays as a winger for USL Championship club Loudoun United, on loan from Major League Soccer club New England Revolution.

== Early career ==
Panayotou was part of the Revolution U-19 Academy team that won the 2022 MLS NEXT Cup Championship, scoring 6 goals in the tournament, including the winning goal in the championship game. He was also named the 2022 UnitedHealthcare Revolution Academy Player of the Year.

Panayotou played one season at Georgetown University, recording 7 goals and three assists across 19 matches.

== Club career ==
Panayotou made his debut for New England Revolution II on April 3, 2022 vs. Rochester New York FC. He scored his first two goals for the club in his next match vs. FC Cincinnati 2.

Panayotou made his debut for the first team on March 25, 2023 in a 2–1 win at D.C. United. His first goal for the Revolution came in the 2024 Leagues Cup group stage vs. Mazatlán F.C., where his second half goal gave the Revolution a 2–1 win.

Panayotou was loaned to Rhode Island FC on May 10, 2024, for the rest of the 2024 season.

In 2025, Panayotou was loaned once again, this time to Rhode Island FC's rivals, Hartford Athletic, for the remainder of the 2025 season. He scored a brace in his debut for the club in the 2025 USL Cup group stage against Portland Hearts of Pine, but was sent off after receiving a second yellow card in the 72nd minute.

== International career ==
Panayotou is a youth international for the United States, having played up to the United States U23s.

== Personal life ==
Born in Cambridge, Massachusetts, Panayotou is of Greek and Cypriot descent.
