= Peyton Miller =

American soccer player (born 2007)

- Miller with the New England Revolution in 2026

Personal information
- Full name: Peyton James Miller
- Date of birth: November 8, 2007 (age 19)
- Place of birth: Farmington, Connecticut, United States
- Height: 5 ft 7 in (1.70 m)
- Position: Defender

Team information
- Current team: New England Revolution
- Number: 25

Youth career
- 2021–2023: New England Revolution

Senior career*
Years	Team	Apps	(Gls)
2023	New England Revolution II	25	(3)
2023–	New England Revolution	50	(6)

International career^{‡}
2022	United States U16	3	(1)
2023	United States U17	7	(0)
2024	United States U20	11	(1)
2025–	United States U23	1	(0)
2026–	United States	2	(0)
- * Club domestic league appearances and goals as of 18:00, July 26, 2026 (UTC) ‡ National team caps and goals as of October 3, 2026

Peyton James Miller (born November 8, 2007) is an American professional soccer player who plays as a defender for Major League Soccer club New England Revolution and the United States national team.

== Club career ==
Miller began training with the Revolution academy as a 13-year-old in April 2021. On June 12, 2023, he signed a professional contract with the Revolution. He was 15 years and 216 days old, making him the youngest professional signing by the Revolution.

Miller made his Revolution first team, and Major League Soccer, debut, on July 17, 2024, against the Philadelphia Union. In doing so he became the second-youngest player to ever appear for the Revolution, behind only Diego Fagúndez. He received MLS "Team of the Matchday" honors for week 28 following his performance in the Revolution's 1-1 draw against FC Dallas on July 20, 2024.

Major League Soccer listed Miller as the 22nd best young player in the league on their annual "22 Under 22" list for the 2024 season.

Miller scored his first professional goal on May 31, 2025, against CF Montréal. He made his 50th start for the Revolution on August 30, 2026.

== International career ==
On September 1, 2023, Miller was called up to the U.S. Under-17 Men's Youth National Team for the Václav Ježek Cup in Hradec Králové, Czech Republic. This was his fifth appearance for the U.S. Youth National Yeam, after previously being called up twice for the U-16s, once for the U-15s, and once before for the U-17s.

On October 25, 2023, Miller was called up for the FIFA U-17 World Cup in Indonesia. He was the second-youngest player on the United States roster. On October 4, 2024, Miller was called up as a forward for a pair of friendlies in Chile with the U.S. Under-20 Men's Youth National Team, where he was again one of the two youngest players at the camp. He started the first of these two friendlies, on October 12, 2024.

== Personal life ==
Miller is from Unionville, Connecticut. He grew up as a fan of the Revolution, and idolized Diego Fagundez, who was the club's youngest professional signing when he signed in 2010. He played for Rick Derrella at Oakwood Soccer Club.

== Career statistics ==
=== Club ===
As of match played November 10, 2023

Appearances and goals by club, season and competition
Club	Season	League			National cup		Continental		Other		Total	
Club	Season	Division	Apps	Goals	Apps	Goals	Apps	Goals	Apps	Goals	Apps	Goals
New England Revolution II
New England Revolution II	2023	MLS Next Pro	25	3	—		—		—		25	3
New England Revolution II	Total		25	3	—		—		—		25	3
Career total			25	3	0	0	0	0	0	0	25	3

=== International ===
As of match played October 3, 2026

Appearances and goals by national team and year
National team	Year	Apps	Goals
United States	2026	2	0
Total		2	0
