= 2023 New England Revolution season =

New England Revolution 2023 soccer season

New England Revolution
2023 season
- President: Brian Bilello
- Head Coach: Bruce Arena (active until August 1 resigned September 9) Richie Williams (from August 1 until September 12) Clint Peay (from September 12)
- Stadium: Gillette Stadium
- MLS: Conference: 5th Overall: 6th
- U.S. Open Cup: Round of 32
- MLS Cup: Round One
- Leagues Cup: Round of 16
- Average home league attendance: 23,940
Home colors	Away colors

The 2023 New England Revolution season was the club's 28th season in existence, and their 28th consecutive season playing in Major League Soccer, the top flight of American soccer. The season began on February 25 when the club began their play in the MLS season. The Revolution also played in the 2023 U.S. Open Cup and the 2023 Leagues Cup. As the 6th place team overall, the Revolution qualified for the first round of the 2024 CONCACAF Champions Cup.

== Background ==
The 2022 season was the Revolution's 27th season of existence, and their 27th season in MLS, the top tier of American soccer. The season began on February 15 when the club began their play in the 2022 CONCACAF Champions League, while the MLS season began on February 26, where the Revolution entered as the defender Supporters' Shield winners, and the season concluded on October 9. The Revolution finished the year 10–12–12 (42 points) leaving them 10th in the Eastern Conference and outside of the 2022 MLS Cup Playoffs. In the 2022 U.S. Open Cup the Revs entered in the Round of 32, defeating FC Cincinnati 5–1, before bowing out in the Round of 16 to New York City FC.

== Club ==
=== Roster ===
Appearances and goals are career totals from all-competitions.

Squad No.	Name	Nationality	Position(s)	Date of birth (age)	Signed from	Games played	Goals scored
Goalkeepers
36	Earl Edwards Jr.	(United States)	GK	December 29, 1996 (aged 25)	(United States) D.C. United	24	0
98	Jacob Jackson	(United States)	GK	April 25, 2000 (aged 22)	(United States) Loyola Marymount Lions	0	0
Defenders
2	Dave Romney	(United States)	DF	June 12, 1993 (aged 29)	(United States) Nashville SC	171	7
3	Omar Gonzalez	(United States)	DF	October 11, 1988 (aged 34)	(Canada) Toronto FC	348	19
4	Henry Kessler	(United States)	DF	June 25, 1998 (aged 24)	(United States) Virginia Cavaliers	72	3
6	Christian Makoun	(Venezuela)	DF	March 5, 2000 (aged 22)	(United States) Charlotte FC	51	2
15	Brandon Bye	(United States)	DF	November 29, 1995 (aged 26)	(United States) Western Michigan Broncos	134	7
24	DeJuan Jones	(Canada) (United States)	DF	June 24, 1996 (aged 26)	(United States) Michigan State Spartans	100	5
44	Ben Sweat	(United States)	DF	September 9, 1991 (aged 31)	(United States) Sporting Kansas City	121	1
88	Andrew Farrell	(United States)	DF	April 2, 1992 (aged 30)	(United States) Louisville Cardinals	304	2
Midfielders
5	Tomás Chancalay	(Argentina)	MF	January 1, 1999 (aged 23)	(Argentina) Racing Club	0	0
8	Matt Polster	(United States)	MF	June 8, 1993 (aged 29)	(Scotland) Rangers	155	7
10	Carles Gil	(Spain)	MF	November 22, 1992 (aged 29)	(Spain) Deportivo La Coruña	101	21
11	Dylan Borrero	(Colombia)	MF	January 5, 2002 (aged 20)	(Brazil) Atlético Mineiro	7	3
13	Maciel	(Brazil)	MF	January 18, 2000 (aged 22)	(Brazil) Botafogo	35	0
16	Joshua Bolma	(Ghana) (United States)	MF	April 10, 2002 (aged 20)	(United States) University of Maryland	0	0
14	Ian Harkes	(United States)	MF	March 30, 1995 (aged 27)	(Scotland) Dundee United FC	33	2
18	Emmanuel Boateng	(Ghana) (United States)	MF	January 17, 1994 (aged 29)	(United States) Columbus Crew	41	4
21	Nacho Gil	(Spain)	MF	September 9, 1995 (aged 27)	(Spain) FC Cartagena	4	0
22	Jack Panayotou	(United States)	MF	June 5, 2004 (aged 18)	(United States) Revs II	0	0
26	Tommy McNamara	(Republic of Ireland) (United States)	MF	February 6, 1991 (aged 31)	(United States) Houston Dynamo FC	208	22
28	Mark-Anthony Kaye	(Canada)	MF	December 2, 1994 (aged 27)	(Canada) Toronto FC	138	15
29	Noel Buck	(England)	MF	April 5, 2005 (aged 17)	(United States) Revs II	7	1
47	Esmir Bajraktarevic	(United States)	MF	March 10, 2005 (aged 17)	(United States) Revs II	3	0
72	Damian Rivera	(Costa Rica)	MF	December 8, 2002 (aged 19)	(United States) Revs II	14	1
Forwards
7	Gustavo Bou	(Argentina)	FW	February 18, 1990 (aged 32)	(Mexico) Tijuana	81	37
9	Giacomo Vrioni	(Albania)	FW	October 15, 1998 (aged 24)	(Italy) Juventus FC	7	1
12	Justin Rennicks	(United States)	FW	March 20, 1999 (aged 23)	(United States) Indiana Hoosiers	24	2
17	Bobby Wood	(United States)	FW	November 15, 1992 (aged 30)	(United States) Real Salt Lake	31	5

=== Roster Exemptions ===
Squad No.	Name	Nationality	Position(s)	Date of birth (age)	2023 Status
77	Ben Reveno	(United States)	DF	March 29, 1999 (aged 23)	Season-long loan to Birmingham Legion
34	Ryan Spaulding	(United States)	DF	September 10, 1998 (aged 24)	Season-long loan to Tampa Bay Rowdies

== Non-competitive ==
=== Preseason exhibitions ===
February 2 1	Inter Miami FC	2–2	New England Revolution	Lakewood Ranch, Florida
11:30 am EST	Campana,	Report	Gil (penalty scored) , Panayotou	Stadium: Premier Sports Complex

February 5 2	Philadelphia Union	2–0	New England Revolution	Lakewood Ranch, Florida
12:00 pm EST	Gazdag 35'; Glesnes (yellow card) 40'; Bueno 71'	Report	Blessing (yellow card) 40'; Vrioni (yellow card) 57'	Stadium: Premier Sports Complex

February 10 3	Nashville SC	0-1	New England Revolution	St Petersburg, Florida
1:00 pm EST		Report	Borrero 50'	Stadium: Al Lang Stadium

February 14 4	FC Cincinnati	4–0	New England Revolution	Clearwater, Florida
12:00 pm EST	Jimenez 8'; Ordoñez 37', 55'; Badji 41'	Report		Stadium: Walter C. Campbell Park

February 18 5	Orlando City SC	1–2	New England Revolution	Orlando, Florida
7:30 pm EST	Angulo 17'	Report	Giacomo Vrioni 70'; 82' (o.g.)	Stadium: Exploria Stadium

== Competitive ==
=== Major League Soccer ===
==== Results ====
February 25 1	Charlotte FC	0–1	New England Revolution	Charlotte, North Carolina
7:30 PM EST	Byrne (yellow card) 28'	Report	Kessler (yellow card) 26', (goal) 89'	Stadium: Bank of America Stadium; Attendance: 69,345; Referee: Rubiel Vazquez

March 4 2	New England Revolution	3–0	Houston Dynamo FC	Foxborough, Massachusetts
7:30 PM EST	Borrero 42'; Buck (yellow card) 46'; Wood 53'; Bye 65'; Jones (yellow card) 88'	Report	Dorsey (yellow card) 18'; Carrasquilla (yellow card) 24'; Clark (yellow card) 37'; Bartlow (yellow card) 87'	Stadium: Gillette Stadium; Attendance: 13,176; Referee: Fotis Bazakos

March 12 3	Los Angeles FC	4–0	New England Revolution	Los Angeles, California
7:30 PM EST	Bouanga 14' (pen.), 67'; Tillman 83'; Biuk 90+6'	Report	Polster (yellow card) 67'	Stadium: BMO Stadium; Attendance: 22,007; Referee: Allen Chapman

March 18 4	New England Revolution	1–0	Nashville SC	Foxborough, Massachusetts
7:30 PM EDT	Bou 52'; Polster (yellow card) 70'	Report	Muyl (yellow card) 21'; Maher (yellow card) 73'	Stadium: Gillette Stadium; Attendance: 14,930; Referee: Jon Freemon

March 25 5	D.C. United	1–2	New England Revolution	Washington, DC
7:30 PM EDT	Benteke 45'; Williams (yellow card) 58'	Report	Bou 63'; Bye (yellow card) 82'; Buck 88'	Stadium: Audi Field; Attendance: 16,509; Referee: Filip Dujic

April 1 6	New England Revolution	1–1	New York City FC	Foxborough, Massachusetts
7:30 PM EDT	Gil 70'	Report	Ilenič (yellow card) 32'; Magno 80'	Stadium: Gillette Stadium; Attendance: 18,521; Referee: Ismail Elfath

April 8 7	New England Revolution	4–0	CF Montreal	Foxborough, Massachusetts
7:30 PM EDT	Borrero 21'; Gil 45+4' (pen.); Wood 50'; Vrioni 86'	Report	Miller (yellow card) 26'; Corbo (yellow card) 45'; Wanyama (yellow card) 54'; Waterman (yellow card) 68'	Stadium: Gillette Stadium; Attendance: 18,021; Referee: Tori Penso

April 15 8	Columbus Crew SC	1–1	New England Revolution	Columbus, Ohio
7:30 PM EDT	Mățan (yellow card) 23'; Degenek (yellow card) 43'; Zawadzki 90+8'	Report	Borrero (yellow card) 56' (yellow-red card) , 65'; Degenek 58' (o.g.)	Stadium: Lower.com Field; Attendance: 20,562; Referee: Chris Penso

April 22 9	New England Revolution	2–1	Sporting Kansas City	Foxborough, Massachusetts
7:30 PM EDT	Vrioni 31', 35'	Report	Russell 50'; Fontàs (red card) 61'	Stadium: Gillette Stadium; Attendance: 19,281; Referee: Nima Saghafi

April 29 10	New England Revolution	1–1	FC Cincinnati	Foxborough, Massachusetts
7:30 PM EDT	45+3' Boateng; (yellow card) 89' Wood	Report	Miazga (yellow card) 12'; Mosquera 31'; Barreal (yellow card) 33'; Santos (yellow card) 45+9'	Stadium: Gillette Stadium; Attendance: 30,080; Referee: Alex Chilowicz

May 6 11	Toronto FC	0–2	New England Revolution	Toronto, Ontario
7:30 PM EDT	(yellow card) 11' Franklin; (yellow card) 40' Camarero; (yellow card) 50' Laryea	Report	19' Wood; 62' Jones	Stadium: BMO Field; Attendance: 27,438; Referee: Fotis Bazakos

May 13 12	Inter Miami FC	2–1	New England Revolution	Fort Lauderdale, Florida
7:30PM EDT	Ruiz 6' (yellow card) 37' (yellow-red card) 81'; Martínez 44' (yellow card) 45'; Taylor (yellow card) 60'; McVey (yellow card) 79'; Campana (yellow card) 85'	Report	Gil 26'; Polster (yellow card) 79'; Buck (yellow card) 87'	Stadium: DRV PNK Stadium; Attendance: 17,349; Referee: Ismir Pekmic

May 20 13	Philadelphia Union	3–0	New England Revolution	Chester, Pennsylvania
7:30 PM EDT	Gazdag 56', 74' (pen.); Carranza 88'; Real (yellow card) 90+3'	Report	Blessing (yellow card) 4'; Wood (yellow card) 45'; Gil (yellow card) 73'; Altidore (yellow card) 84'; Romney (yellow card) 90'	Stadium: Subaru Park; Attendance: 19,079; Referee: Lukasz Szpala

May 27 14	New England Revolution	3–3	Chicago Fire	Foxborough, Massachusetts
7:30 PM EDT	Buck 38'; Wood 40'; Blessing (yellow card) 50'; Altidore 83'; Jones (yellow card) 90+2'	Report	Koutsias 10'; Farrell 22' (o.g.); Torres (yellow card) 47'; Haile-Selassie 79'	Stadium: Gillette Stadium; Attendance: 27,293; Referee: Malik Badawi

May 31 15	Atlanta United FC	3–3	New England Revolution	Atlanta, Georgia
7:30 PM EDT	Ibarra (yellow card) 55'; Giakoumakis 56', (yellow card) 81'; Almada 74'; Guzan (yellow card) 83'; Berry 87'; Gutman (yellow card) 90+2'	Report	Gil 1', 90+3'; González (yellow card) 22'; Wood 37'; Buck (yellow card) 52'	Stadium: Mercedes-Benz Stadium; Attendance: 42,915; Referee: Rubiel Vazquez

June 3 16	New York City FC	0–0	New England Revolution	New York, New York
3:30 PM EDT	Chanot (yellow card) 81'; Cufré (red card) 90+1'	Report	Boateng (yellow card) 43'; Gil (yellow card) 85'	Stadium: Yankee Stadium; Attendance: 22,203; Referee: Rosendo Mendoza

June 10 17	New England Revolution	3–1	Inter Miami FC	Foxborough, Massachusetts
7:30 PM EDT	Gil 27' (pen.); Polster 34'; Wood 51'; Blessing (yellow card) 67'; Farrell (yellow card) 83'	Report	Fray (yellow card) 42'; McVey (yellow card) 45'; Ruíz (yellow card) 70'; Yedlin (yellow card) 70'; Allen (yellow card) 76'; Martínez 84'	Stadium: Gillette Stadium; Attendance: 36,235; Referee: Sergii Boiko

June 17 18	New England Revolution	3–1	Orlando City SC	Foxborough, Massachusetts
7:30 PM EDT	Boateng 51'; Bou 69'; Buck (yellow card) 85'; Gil 85'; Edwards Jr. (yellow card) 90+4'	Report	Araújo (yellow card) 3'; Halliday (yellow card) 22'; McGuire 80'	Stadium: Gillette Stadium; Attendance: 21,492; Referee: Fotis Bazakos

June 24 19	New England Revolution	2–1	Toronto FC	Foxborough, Massachusetts
7:30 PM EDT	Wood 33'; Vrioni 52'	Report	Kerr 11'	Stadium: Gillette Stadium; Attendance: 24,596; Referee: Ted Unkel

July 1 20	FC Cincinnati	2–2	New England Revolution	Cincinnati, Ohio
7:30 PM EDT	Badji 11', 55'; Nwobodo (yellow card) 36'	Report	Badji 15' (o.g.); Bou 24'; Gil (yellow card) 51'; Blessing (yellow card) 52'	Stadium: TQL Stadium; Attendance: 25,513; Referee: Jon Freemon

July 8 21	New York Red Bulls	2–1	New England Revolution	Harrison, New Jersey
7:30 PM EDT	Amaya 58'; Reyes (yellow card) 74'; Harper (yellow card) 75'; Duncan (yellow card) 82'; Carmona 85'	Report	Wood (yellow card) 6'; Blessing (red card) 60'; Bye 76'	Stadium: Red Bull Arena; Attendance: 20,014; Referee: Rubiel Vazquez

July 12 22	New England Revolution	2–1	Atlanta United FC	Foxborough, Massachusetts
7:30 PM EDT	Polster 4', (yellow card) 69'; Vrioni 9'; Panayotou (yellow card) 82'	Report	Mosquera (yellow card) 80'; Chol 90+3'	Stadium: Gillette Stadium; Attendance: 17,615; Referee: Alex Chilowicz

July 15 23	New England Revolution	4–0	D.C. United	Foxborough, Massachusetts
7:30 PM EDT	Wood (yellow card) 33'; Bou 45'; Harkes 45+7', 49'; Hines-Ike 73' (o.g.)	Report	Klich (yellow card) 61' (yellow-red card) 90+1'	Stadium: Gillette Stadium; Attendance: 29,884; Referee: Ismir Pekmic

August 26 24	CF Montreal	1–0	New England Revolution	Montreal, Quebec
7:30 PM EDT	Campbell 86'	Report	Polster (yellow card) 25'	Stadium: Saputo Stadium; Attendance: 19,619; Referee: Ted Unkel

August 30 25	New England Revolution	1–0	New York Red Bulls	Foxborough, Massachusetts
7:30 PM EDT	Vrioni 30'; Gil (yellow card) 39'; Polster (yellow card) 74'	Report	Amaya (yellow card) 67'	Stadium: Gillette Stadium; Attendance: 16,444; Referee: Malik Badawi

September 2 26	New England Revolution	2–2	Austin FC	Foxborough, Massachusetts
7:30 PM EDT	Rigoni 27'; Valencia (yellow card) 70'; Pereira (yellow card) 77'; Finlay (yellow card) 90'; Ring 90+4'	Report	Chancalay 28', 47', (yellow card) 54'; Kaye (yellow card) 57'	Stadium: Gillette Stadium; Attendance: 26,213; Referee: Marcos de Oliveira

September 9 27	Minnesota United FC	1–1	New England Revolution	Saint Paul, Minnesota
8:30 PM EDT	Fragapane 90+3'	Report	Jones (yellow card) 14'; González (yellow card) 25'; Gil 38'; Edwards Jr. (yellow card) 74'; Polster (yellow card) 75'	Stadium: Allianz Field; Attendance: 19,412; Referee: Jair Marrufo
Note: Match was originally scheduled for June 21

September 16 28	Colorado Rapids	2–1	New England Revolution	Commerce City, Colorado
9:30 PM EDT	Navarro (yellow card) 40'; Cabral (yellow card) 45'; Bassett 48'; Harris 62'; Rubio (yellow card) 72'; Nicholson (yellow card) 84'	Report	Gonzalez (yellow card) 7', (goal) 90+2'; Gil (yellow card) 49'; Harkes (yellow card) 59'	Stadium: Dick's Sporting Goods Park; Attendance: 16,411; Referee: Rosendo Mendoza

September 23 29	Chicago Fire FC	2–2	New England Revolution	Chicago, Illinois
8:30 PM EDT	Gutiérrez 18'; Giménez 54', (yellow card) 65'; Doumbia (yellow card) 90+8'	Report	Chancalay 17', (yellow card) 90+10'; C. Gil 59'	Stadium: Soldier Field; Attendance: 20,129; Referee: Timothy Ford

September 30 30	New England Revolution	2–1	Charlotte FC	Foxborough, Massachusetts
7:30 PM EDT	Nacho Gil (yellow card) 28'; Buck 64'; Romney 85'	Report	Westwood (yellow card) 37'; Świderski (yellow card) 45+2', (goal) 84'	Stadium: Gillette Stadium; Attendance: 37,701; Referee: Lukasz Szpala

October 4 31	New England Revolution	1–2	Columbus Crew SC	Foxborough, Massachusetts
7:30 PM EDT	Polster (yellow card) 45+2'; Chancalay 48'	Report	Rossi 20'; Amundsen (yellow card) 58', (goal) 86'; Nagbe (yellow card) 61'; Zawadzki (yellow card) 70'; Ramírez (yellow card) 90'	Stadium: Gillette Stadium; Attendance: 14,144; Referee: Alexis Da Silva

October 7 32	Orlando City SC	3–2	New England Revolution	Orlando, Florida
7:30 PM EDT	McGuire 31'; Torres 37'; Angulo 45'	Report	C. Gil 42', 90+3'; McNamara (yellow card) 84'	Stadium: Exploria Stadium; Attendance: 24,440; Referee: Allen Chapman

October 14 33	Nashville SC	3–2	New England Revolution	Nashville, Tennessee
8:30 PM EDT	McCarty 19', (yellow card) 59'; Surridge 30', 45+3'; Mukhtar (yellow card) 42'	Report	Chancalay 49', 71'; Polster (yellow card) 90'	Stadium: Geodis Park; Attendance: 27,780; Referee: Guido Gonzales Jr.
Note: Rescheduled from August 20 due to Nashville SC's participation in the Leagues Cup final.

October 21 34	New England Revolution	2–1	Philadelphia Union	Foxborough, Massachusetts
6:00 PM EDT	Bou 25' (pen.), 42'	Report	Harriel (yellow card) 7'; Carranza 16', (yellow card) 90+2'; Lowe (yellow card) 24'; Wagner (yellow card) 24'	Stadium: Gillette Stadium; Attendance: 41,355; Referee: Tori Penso

=== MLS Cup Playoffs ===
October 28 Round One	Philadelphia Union	3–1	New England Revolution	Chester, Pennsylvania
5:00 pm EDT	Gazdag 19' (pen.); Uhre 26'; Harriel 37'; Martínez (yellow card) 87'	Report	Wood (yellow card) 29'; Farrell (yellow card) 35'; Chancalay (yellow card) 37'; Bou 68'; Vrioni (yellow card) 87'	Stadium: Subaru Park; Attendance: 19,778; Referee: Pierre-Luc Lauziere

November 8 Round One	New England Revolution	0–1	Philadelphia Union	Foxborough, Massachusetts
7:00 pm EST	Kaye (red card) 45'; C. Gil (yellow card) 90+4'	Report	Lowe (yellow card) 33'; Donovan 79'	Stadium: Gillette Stadium; Attendance: 15,214; Referee: Drew Fischer
Note: Philadelphia Union won the series 2–0.

=== U.S. Open Cup ===
Apr 25 Third Round	New England Revolution (Massachusetts)	2–1	(Connecticut) Hartford Athletic (USL-C)	Foxborough, Massachusetts
7:30pm EDT	Rennicks 13'; Romney 76'; Gil (yellow card) 86'	Report	Torres (yellow card) 30'; Cedeno (yellow card) 36' Hoppenot 52'; Lapert (yellow card) 90+2'	Stadium: Gillette Stadium; Attendance: 1,988; Referee: Jeremy Scheer

May 9 Round of 32	New England Revolution (Massachusetts)	0–1	(Pennsylvania) Pittsburgh Riverhounds SC (USLC)	Foxborough, Massachusetts
7:30pm EDT	Blessing (yellow card) 19'; Panayotou (yellow card) 85'	Report	Griffin 44'; Biasi (yellow card) 81'	Stadium: Gillette Stadium; Attendance: 1,100; Referee: Matthew Thompson

=== Leagues Cup ===
==== East 4 ====
Pos	Team	Pld	W	PW	PL	L	GF	GA	GD	Pts	Qualification	NYR	NER	ASL
1	(United States) New York Red Bulls	2	1	1	0	0	2	1	+1	5	Advance to knockout stage	—	0–0	2–1
2	(United States) New England Revolution	2	1	0	1	0	5	1	+4	4	Advance to knockout stage	—	—	—
3	(Mexico) Atlético San Luis	2	0	0	0	2	2	7	−5	0		—	1–5	—

Source: Leagues Cup
Rules for classification: Tiebreakers

July 22 Group	New York Red Bulls (United States)	0–0 (4–2 p)	(United States) New England Revolution	Harrison, New Jersey
7:30pm EST	Harper (yellow card) 47'	Report	Wood (yellow card) 26'	Stadium: Red Bull Arena; Attendance: 9,139; Referee: Pierre-Luc Lauziere
	Penalties
	Manoel (penalty missed); Edelman (penalty scored); Vanzeir (penalty scored); Nealis (penalty scored); Tolkin (penalty scored)		(penalty scored) Gil; (penalty scored) Bou; (penalty missed) Jones; (penalty missed) Vrioni

July 26 Group	New England Revolution (United States)	5–1	(Mexico) Atlético San Luis	Foxborough, Massachusetts
7:30pm EST	Vrioni 15', 39', 60'; Bou 29'; Domínguez 32' (o.g.); Gil (yellow card) 79'	Report	Zaldívar (yellow card) 7'; Klimowicz 22', (yellow card) 36'	Stadium: Gillette Stadium; Attendance: 12,327; Referee: Rubiel Vazquez

August 3 R32	New England Revolution (United States)	2–2 (8–7 p)	(Mexico) Atlas	Foxborough, Massachusetts
8:00pm EST	Bou 30', 79'; Gil (yellow card) 34'; Kaye (yellow card) 62'	Report	García 8'; Caicedo 11'; Santamaría (yellow card) 56' (yellow-red card) 90+8'; Martínez (yellow card) 63'	Stadium: Gillette Stadium; Attendance: 9,299; Referee: Fernando Guerrero Ramírez
	Penalties
	(penalty scored) Vrioni; (penalty scored) Polster; (penalty scored) Jones; (penalty scored) Gil; (penalty scored) Bou; (penalty scored) Boateng; (penalty scored) Harkes; (penalty scored) Farrell		Reyes (penalty scored); Manotas (penalty scored); Lozano (penalty scored); Caicedo (penalty scored); Rocha (penalty scored); Zapata (penalty scored); Trejo (penalty scored); Abella (penalty missed)

August 7 R16	New England Revolution (United States)	1–1 (3–4 p)	(Mexico) Querétaro	Foxborough, Massachusetts
8:00pm EST	Romney (yellow card) 40'; Bajraktarevic 78'		Sierra (yellow card) 18'; Valencia 46'; Gómez (yellow card) 63'; Lértora (yellow card) 65'	Stadium: Gillette Stadium; Attendance: 8,895; Referee: Daniel Quintero Huitrón
	Penalties
	(penalty scored) Vrioni; (penalty scored) Polster; (penalty scored) Jones; (penalty missed) Gil; (penalty missed) Harkes		Sepúlveda (penalty scored); Escamilla (penalty scored); Torres (penalty scored); Lértora (penalty scored)

== Transfers ==
=== Transfers in ===
Date	Position	No.	Name	From	Fee/notes	Ref.
December 5, 2022	FW	17	(United States) Bobby Wood	(United States) Real Salt Lake	Stage 2, MLS Re-Entry Draft	
December 21, 2022	MF	16	(Ghana) Joshua Bolma	2023 MLS SuperDraft	Round 1	
January 3, 2023	MF	19	(Ghana) Latif Blessing	(United States) Los Angeles FC	Trade	
January 5, 2023	DF	2	(United States) Dave Romney	(United States) Nashville SC	Trade	
January 10, 2023	MF	22	(United States) Jack Panayotou	Revolution Academy	Homegrown	
April 18, 2023	DF	44	(United States) Ben Sweat	(United States) Sporting Kansas City	Waivers	
July 5, 2023	MF	14	(United States) Ian Harkes	(Scotland) Dundee United FC	Signed (acquired rights from DC United)	
July 10, 2023	MF	5	(Argentina) Tomás Chancalay	(Argentina) Racing Club	Loan	
July 13, 2023	MF	28	(Canada) Mark-Anthony Kaye	(Canada) Toronto FC	Trade	
August 26, 2023	GK	34	(Czech Republic) Tomáš Vaclík	(England) Huddersfield Town	Free	

=== Transfers out ===
Date	Position	No.	Name	To	Fee/notes	Ref.
October 13, 2022	GK	94	(Senegal) Clément Diop	(United States) Atlanta United FC	Option declined, Free agent	
October 13, 2022	MF	5	(Cameroon) Wilfrid Kaptoum	(Spain) Las Palmas	Option declined	
October 13, 2022	FW	17	(Uganda) Edward Kizza	(United States) Pittsburgh Riverhounds SC	Option declined	
November 11, 2022	DF	23	(United States) Jonathan Bell	(United States) St Louis City SC	Expansion Draft	
November 14, 2022	MF	22	(Libya) Ismael Tajouri-Shradi	(Cyprus) Omonia	Option declined	
November 17, 2022	DF	28	(United States) AJ DeLaGarza	Retired		
January 4, 2023	GK	18	(United States) Brad Knighton	Retired		
June 15, 2023	FW	14	(United States) Jozy Altidore		Contract buyout	
July 13, 2023	MD	19	(Ghana) Latif Blessing	(Canada) Toronto FC	Trade	
August 26, 2023	GK	99	(Serbia) Đorđe Petrović	(England) Chelsea	$18m	

=== MLS SuperDraft picks ===
2023 New England Revolution SuperDraft Picks
Round	Selection	Player	Position	College	Status
1	4	Joshua Bolma	MF	University of Maryland	Generation Adidas
2	39	Victor Souza	DF	Boston College	Signed with Revs II
3	68	Andreas Ueland	DF	University of Virginia	Released

== Statistics ==
=== Top scorers ===
Rank	Position	No.	Name	MLS	U.S. Open Cup	Leagues Cup	MLS Cup	Total
1	MF	22	(Spain) Carles Gil	11	0	0	0	11
1	FW	7	(Argentina) Gustavo Bou	7	0	3	1	11
3	FW	9	(Albania) Giacomo Vrioni	6	0	3	0	9
4	FW	17	(United States) Bobby Wood	7	0	0	0	7
5	FW	5	(Argentina) Tomás Chancalay	6	0	0	0	6
6	MF	29	(England) Noel Buck	3	0	0	0	3
7	MF	11	(Colombia) Dylan Borrero	2	0	0	0	2
7	MF	18	(Ghana) Emmanuel Boateng	2	0	0	0	2
7	MF	14	(United States) Ian Harkes	2	0	0	0	2
7	MF	8	(United States) Matt Polster	2	0	0	0	2
7	DF	15	(United States) Brandon Bye	2	0	0	0	2
7	DF	2	(United States) Dave Romney	1	1	0	0	2
13	DF	4	(United States) Henry Kessler	1	0	0	0	1
13	DF	24	(United States) DeJuan Jones	1	0	0	0	1
13	FW	14	(United States) Jozy Altidore	1	0	0	0	1
13	DF	3	(United States) Omar Gonzalez	1	0	0	0	1
13	FW	12	(United States) Justin Rennicks	0	1	0	0	1
13	MF	47	(United States) Esmir Bajraktarevic	0	0	1	0	1
			Own Goal	3	0	1	0	4
Total				59	2	8	1	69

- Source: Team Stats

=== Top assists ===
Rank	Position	No.	Name	MLS	U.S. Open Cup	Leagues Cup	MLS Cup	Total
1	MF	10	(Spain) Carles Gil	15	1	0	0	16
2	DF	24	(United States) DeJuan Jones	7	0	0	0	7
3	FW	7	(Argentina) Gustavo Bou	4	0	2	0	6
4	FW	17	(United States) Bobby Wood	5	0	0	0	5
5	MF	18	(Ghana) Emmanuel Boateng	3	0	0	0	3
5	MF	28	(Canada) Mark-Anthony Kaye	3	0	0	0	3
5	DF	15	(United States) Brandon Bye	2	0	1	0	3
5	MF	8	(United States) Matt Polster	2	0	1	0	3
5	FW	9	(Albania) Giacomo Vrioni	2	0	0	1	3
10	MF	23	(Spain) Nacho Gil	2	0	0	0	2
10	MF	29	(England) Noel Buck	2	0	0	0	2
12	MF	11	(Colombia) Dylan Borrero	1	0	0	0	1
12	MF	19	(Ghana) Latif Blessing	1	0	0	0	1
12	GK	99	(Serbia) Djordje Petrovic	1	0	0	0	1
12	DF	2	(United States) Dave Romney	1	0	0	0	1
12	DF	6	(Venezuela) Christian Makoun	1	0	0	0	1
12	FW	72	(Costa Rica) Damian Rivera	0	1	0	0	1
12	MF	14	(United States) Ian Harkes	0	0	1	0	1
Total				52	2	5	1	60

- Source: Team Stats

=== Disciplinary record ===
No.	Pos.	Player	MLS			U.S. Open Cup			Leagues Cup			MLS Cup			Total		
No.	Pos.	Player	Yellow card	(yellow card) (yellow-red card)	Red card	Yellow card	(yellow card) (yellow-red card)	Red card	Yellow card	(yellow card) (yellow-red card)	Red card	Yellow card	(yellow card) (yellow-red card)	Red card	Yellow card	(yellow card) (yellow-red card)	Red card
10	MF	(Spain) Carles Gil	6	0	0	1	0	0	2	0	0	1	0	0	10	0	0
8	MF	(United States) Matt Polster	9	0	0	0	0	0	0	0	0	0	0	0	9	0	0
17	FW	(United States) Bobby Wood	4	0	0	0	0	0	1	0	0	1	0	0	6	0	0
19	MF	(Ghana) Latif Blessing	4	0	1	1	0	0	0	0	0	0	0	0	5	0	1
29	MF	(England) Noel Buck	4	0	0	0	0	0	0	0	0	0	0	0	4	0	0
3	DF	(United States) Omar Gonzalez	3	0	0	0	0	0	0	0	0	0	0	0	3	0	0
24	DF	(United States) DeJuan Jones	3	0	0	0	0	0	0	0	0	0	0	0	3	0	0
5	FW	(Argentina) Tomás Chancalay	2	0	0	0	0	0	0	0	0	1	0	0	3	0	0
28	MF	(Canada) Mark-Anthony Kaye	1	0	0	0	0	0	1	0	0	0	1	0	2	1	0
36	GK	(United States) Earl Edwards Jr	2	0	0	0	0	0	0	0	0	0	0	0	2	0	0
88	DF	(United States) Andrew Farrell	1	0	0	0	0	0	0	0	0	1	0	0	2	0	0
22	MF	(United States) Jack Panayotou	1	0	0	1	0	0	0	0	0	0	0	0	2	0	0
2	DF	(United States) David Romney	1	0	0	0	0	0	1	0	0	0	0	0	2	0	0
11	MF	(Colombia) Dylan Borrero	1	1	0	0	0	0	0	0	0	0	0	0	1	1	0
4	DF	(United States) Henry Kessler	1	0	0	0	0	0	0	0	0	0	0	0	1	0	0
15	DF	(United States) Brandon Bye	1	0	0	0	0	0	0	0	0	0	0	0	1	0	0
14	FW	(United States) Jozy Altidore	1	0	0	0	0	0	0	0	0	0	0	0	1	0	0
18	MF	(Ghana) Emmanuel Boateng	1	0	0	0	0	0	0	0	0	0	0	0	1	0	0
14	MF	(United States) Ian Harkes	1	0	0	0	0	0	0	0	0	0	0	0	1	0	0
26	MF	(United States) Tommy McNamara	1	0	0	0	0	0	0	0	0	0	0	0	1	0	0
9	FW	(Albania) Giacomo Vrioni	0	0	0	0	0	0	0	0	0	1	0	0	1	0	0
Total			48	1	1	3	0	0	5	0	0	5	1	0	61	2	1

- Source: Team Stats

=== Clean sheets ===
No.	Name	MLS	US Open Cup	Leagues Cup	MLS Cup	Total	Games
99	(Serbia) Djordje Petrovic	7	0	1	0	8	25
36	(United States) Earl Edwards Jr.	1	0	0	0	1	14

- Source: Team Stats

== See also ==
- 2023 New England Revolution II season
