= Justin Rennicks =

American soccer player (born 1999)

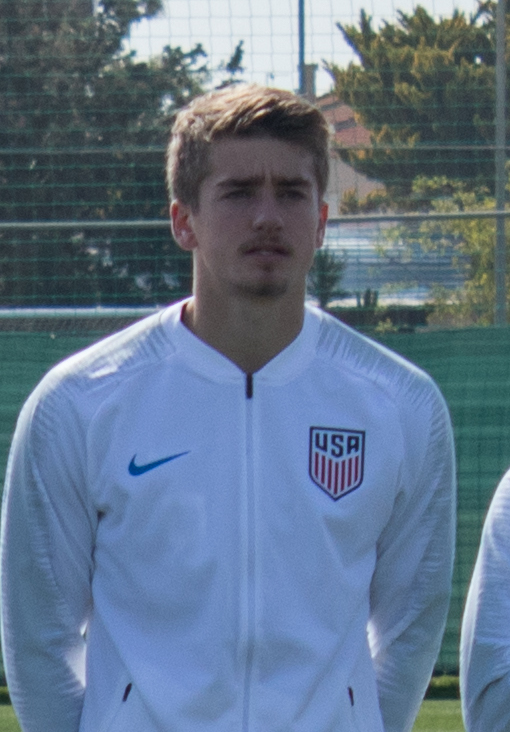
- Rennicks with the United States U20 in 2019

Personal information
- Full name: Justin Gerard Rennicks
- Date of birth: March 20, 1999 (age 27)
- Place of birth: South Hamilton, Massachusetts, United States
- Height: 5 ft 11 in (1.80 m)
- Position: Forward

Team information
- Current team: New Mexico United
- Number: 9

Youth career
- 2012–2017: New England Revolution

College career
Years	Team	Apps	(Gls)
2017–2018	Indiana Hoosiers	29	(6)

Senior career*
Years	Team	Apps	(Gls)
2017–2018	Boston Bolts	11	(1)
2019–2023	New England Revolution	39	(2)
2019	→ North Carolina FC (loan)	10	(0)
2020–2023	→ New England Revolution II	37	(9)
2024–2025	AC Oulu	45	(10)
2026–	New Mexico United	24	(1)

International career
- United States U16
2017	United States U18		
2018–2019	United States U20	16	(7)
- * Club domestic league appearances and goals as of November 2, 2026

Justin Gerard Rennicks (born March 20, 1999) is an American professional soccer player who plays as a forward for USL Championship club New Mexico United.

== Career ==
=== College and amateur ===
Rennicks was born in South Hamilton, Massachusetts, and played his college career at Indiana University between 2017 and 2018, making 29 appearances, scoring nine goals and tallying one assist.

Rennicks also played for USL Premier Development League side Boston Bolts in both their 2017 and 2018 seasons.

=== Professional ===
On January 18, 2019, Rennicks opted to leave college early and signed a Homegrown Player contract with Major League Soccer side New England Revolution. Rennicks made his professional debut on March 9, 2019, appearing as a half-time substitute in a 2–0 loss to Columbus Crew SC.

On August 1, 2019, Rennicks joined USL Championship side North Carolina FC on loan for the remainder of the season.

On September 12, 2020, Rennicks joined USL League One affiliate New England Revolution II on loan for the remainder of the season. He made his debut on September 16 and scored his first goal for the club three days later against Union Omaha.

On April 9, 2022, Rennicks scored his first MLS goal, redirecting a DeJuan Jones cross past Inter Miami CF's Nick Marsman in the 11th minute of the match.

On 7 December 2023, AC Oulu in Finnish Veikkausliiga announced the signing of Rennicks on a one-year deal, with an option for an additional year, starting in 2024. On 24 October, his option was exercised.

On 25 December 2025, New Mexico United announced the signing of Rennicks for the 2026 USL Championship season.

== Career statistics ==
As of match played 28 June 2025

Appearances and goals by club, season and competition
Club	Season	League			Cup (Note: Includes U.S. Open Cup and Suomen Cup)		Other		Total	
Club	Season	Division	Apps	Goals	Apps	Goals	Apps	Goals	Apps	Goals
Boston Bolts	2017	USL League Two	6	1	—		—		6	1
Boston Bolts	2018	USL League Two	5	0	—		—		5	0
Boston Bolts	Total		11	1	—		—		11	1
New England Revolution	2019	MLS	2	0	1	1	—		3	1
New England Revolution	2020	MLS	4	0	0	0	3 (Note: Appearances in MLS Cup Playoffs)	0	7	0
New England Revolution	2021	MLS	1	0	0	0	0	0	1	0
New England Revolution	2022	MLS	17	2	2	0	—		19	2
New England Revolution	2023	MLS	15	0	2	1	0	0	17	1
New England Revolution	Total		39	2	5	2	3	0	47	4
North Carolina FC (loan)	2019	USL Championship	10	0	—		—		10	0
New England Revolution II (loan)	2020	USL League One	8	4	—		—		8	4
New England Revolution II (loan)	2021	USL League One	27	5	—		—		27	5
New England Revolution II (loan)	2022	MLS Next Pro	2	0	—		—		2	0
New England Revolution II (loan)	Total		37	9	—		—		37	9
AC Oulu	2024	Veikkausliiga	21	5	3	1	4 (Note: Includes Finnish League Cup)	0	28	6
AC Oulu	2025	Veikkausliiga	11	3	4	1	4	1	19	5
AC Oulu	Total		32	8	7	2	8	1	47	11
Career total			129	20	12	4	11	1	149	24

== Honors ==
United States U20

- CONCACAF U20 Championship: 2018
