= 2020 New England Revolution II season =

New England Revolution II
2020 season
- Owner: The Kraft Group
- Head coach: Clint Peay
- Stadium: Gillette Stadium
- USL League One: 9th
- USL1 Playoffs: Did not qualify
- Biggest win: RIC 0–4 NE (Oct. 3)
- Biggest defeat: CHA 4–0 NE (Aug. 29); NE 0–4 MAD (Sept. 4); TRM 4–0 NE (Oct. 21)
Home colors	Away colors

The 2020 New England Revolution II season was the inaugural season in the soccer team's history, where they compete in the third division of American soccer, USL League One. New England Revolution II, as a child club of New England Revolution of Major League Soccer, are barred from participating in the 2020 U.S. Open Cup. New England Revolution II play their home games at Gillette Stadium, located in Foxborough, Massachusetts, United States.

== Club ==
=== Roster ===
As of March 3, 2020.

No.	Pos.	Nat.	Name
	DF	(Denmark)	Oskar Bloch
	MF	(Brazil)	Lucas Felix
	DF	(United States)	Simon Lekressner
	MF	(Democratic Republic of the Congo)	Mayele Malango
	MF	(Portugal)	Tiago Mendonca
	GK	(United States)	Keegan Meyer
	FW	(United States)	Connor Presley
	GK	(United States)	Joe Rice
	DF	(Japan)	Ryo Shimazaki
	FW	(Cape Verde)	Meny Silva
	FW	(Costa Rica)	Orlando Sinclair
	MF	(United States)	Ryan Spaulding
	DF	(United States)	Collin Verfurth
	DF	(United States)	Nick Woodruff

=== Coaching staff ===
Name	Position
(United States) Clint Peay	Head coach

== Competitions ==
=== Exhibitions ===
February 19, 2020 Preseason 1	Hartford Athletic	5–1	New England Revolution II	Farmington, Connecticut
1:00 PM EST	Guzmán 12', 15', 38', 45+1'; Vasquez 76'	Report	Trialist 66'	Stadium: Farmington Sports Arena

February 22, 2020 Preseason 2	New England Revolution II	1–0	Hartford Athletic	Foxborough, Massachusetts
1:00 PM EST	Presley (yellow card) 20'; Spaulding 31'	Report	Silva (yellow card) 72'	Stadium: Gillette Stadium; Attendance: 0
Note: Closed door scrimmage

February 29, 2020 Preseason 3	New York Red Bulls II	3–0	New England Revolution II	Whippany, New Jersey
2:00 PM EST		Report		Stadium: Red Bull Training Facility

=== USL League One ===
==== Standings ====
Pos	Team	Pld	W	L	D	GF	GA	GD	Pts	PPG
7	Forward Madison FC	16	5	5	6	20	14	+6	21	1.31
8	Tormenta FC	16	5	7	4	19	22	−3	19	1.19
9	New England Revolution II (Note: Professional teams that are owned by teams playing in a higher division are ineligible for the U.S. Open Cup.)	16	5	8	3	19	26	−7	18	1.13
10	Fort Lauderdale CF	16	4	9	3	19	28	−9	15	0.94
11	Orlando City B	15	1	11	3	10	29	−19	6	0.40

Source: 2020 USL League One standings
Rules for classification: 1) points; 2) total wins; 3) total goal differential; 4) total goals scored; 5) points earned against top four Conference finishers; 6) disciplinary points; 7) coin toss or drawing of lots

==== Results summary ====
Overall								Home						Away					
Pld	W	D	L	GF	GA	GD	Pts	W	D	L	GF	GA	GD	W	D	L	GF	GA	GD
16	5	3	8	19	26	−7	18	2	2	4	8	12	−4	3	1	4	11	14	−3

Source: USL League One

==== Results by round ====
Round	1	2	3	4	5	6	7	8	9	10	11	12	13	14	15	16
Stadium	H	H	A	H	H	A	H	H	A	A	A	A	H	H	A	A
Result	D	L	D	L	W	L	L	L	L	W	W	W	W	D	L	L
Position										10						9

Source: USL League One
A = Away; H = Home; W = Win; D = Draw; L = Loss

==== Match results ====
July 25, 2020 1	New England Revolution II	0–0	Union Omaha	Foxborough, Massachusetts
5:00 PM EDT	Bell (yellow card) 40'; Burns (yellow card) 90+3'; Sinclair (yellow card) 90+5'; Verfurth (yellow card) 90+7'	Report	Contreras (yellow card) 54'	Stadium: Gillette Stadium; Referee: Adam Kilpatrick

August 7, 2020 2	New England Revolution II	0–2	Orlando City B	Foxborough, Massachusetts
7:00 PM EDT	Shimazaki (yellow card) 29' (yellow-red card) 38'; Mendonca (yellow card) 87'	Report	Tablante (yellow card) 40'; Rivera 66'; Tanaka 90+1'	Stadium: Gillette Stadium; Referee: Ernie Constantine

August 15, 2020 3	North Texas SC	3–3	New England Revolution II	Arlington, Texas
8:00 PM EDT	Roberts 4'; Damus 27'; Bruce 90+2'	Report	Firmino 16'; Quinones (yellow card) 22'; Angking 58', 79'; Bell (yellow card) 81'	Stadium: Globe Life Park; Attendance: 952; Referee: Gloria Resendiz

August 21, 2020 4	New England Revolution II	1–2	Richmond Kickers	Foxborough, Massachusetts
7:00 PM EDT	Malango 71'; Mendonca (yellow card) 78'	Report	Terzaghi 53'; Cuomo (yellow card) 69'; Kraft 82'	Stadium: Gillette Stadium; Referee: Hao Zhong

August 26, 2020 5	New England Revolution II	1–0	Greenville Triumph SC	Foxborough, Massachusetts
7:00 PM EDT	Shimazaki 57'; Quinones (yellow card) 61'; Maciel (yellow card) 87'; Mendonca (yellow card) 90+2'; Sinclair (yellow card) 90+5'	Report		Stadium: Gillette Stadium; Referee: Adam Kilpatrick

August 29, 2020 6	Chattanooga Red Wolves SC	4–0	New England Revolution II	East Ridge, Tennessee
1:00 PM EDT	Zacarías 12', (yellow card) 90+2'; Hernández 29', 38'; Folla (yellow card) 57'; Beattie 88'	Report		Stadium: Chattanooga Red Wolves Stadium; Referee: Joshua Belk

September 4, 2020 7	New England Revolution II	0–4	Forward Madison FC	Foxborough, Massachusetts
7:00 PM EDT		Report	Vang 39'; Verfurth 61' (o.g.); Ovalle 88'; Wojcik 90+1'	Stadium: Gillette Stadium; Referee: Kenneth Rojas

September 9, 2020 8	New England Revolution II	1–2	Chattanooga Red Wolves SC	Foxborough, Massachusetts
7:00 PM EDT	Sinclair 45+1'; Presley (yellow card) 90+2'	Report	Ramos 10'; Ricketts (yellow card) 45'; Souza 83' (o.g.); R. Pineda (yellow card) 89'	Stadium: Gillette Stadium; Referee: Joshua Encarnación

September 16, 2020 9	FC Tucson	1–0	New England Revolution II	Tucson, Arizona
9:30 PM EDT	Elivelton 8'; Liadi (yellow card) 90+1'; Alarcón (yellow card) 90+4'	Report	Maciel (yellow card) 29'	Stadium: Kino North Stadium; Referee: Isaiah Vlad

September 19, 2020 10	Union Omaha	0–2	New England Revolution II	Papillion, Nebraska
7:00 PM EDT	David (yellow card) 60'; Scearce (yellow card) 88'; Vanacore-Decker (red card) 90+1'	Report	Rennicks 11'; Sinclair (yellow card) 58'; Firmino 90+8'	Stadium: Werner Park; Attendance: 2,500; Referee: Jon Freemon

September 26, 2020 11	Orlando City B	0–1	New England Revolution II	Kissimmee, Florida
10:00 AM EDT	Rivera (yellow card) 38'; Williams (yellow card) 42'; Rodas (yellow card) 82'; Quintero (yellow card) 90+2'	Report	Rennicks 46'	Stadium: Osceola County Stadium; Referee: Alex Billeter

October 3, 2020 12	Richmond Kickers	0–4	New England Revolution II	Richmond, Virginia
5:30 PM EDT	Ackwei (yellow card) 86'; Kwesele (yellow card) 90'	Report	Venter 24' (o.g.); Firmino 31'; Quinones (yellow card) 45+4'; Rennicks 81' (o.g.); Rivera 83'	Stadium: City Stadium; Attendance: 875; Referee: Gary Gutierrez

October 9, 2020 13	New England Revolution II	4–1	Fort Lauderdale CF	Foxborough, Massachusetts
6:00 PM EDT	Firmino (yellow card) 27', (goal) 42'; Rennicks 60'; Maciel (yellow card) 64'; Spaulding 75'; Mendonca 90+3'	Report	Sosa (yellow card) 24'; Méndez (yellow card) 30'; Valencia 52'; Carrasco (yellow card) 56'	Stadium: Gillette Stadium; Referee: Kenneth Rojas

October 16, 2020 14	New England Revolution II	1–1	North Texas SC	Foxborough, Massachusetts
6:00 PM EDT	Rivera 9'	Report	Do. Hernandez (yellow card) 30', (goal) 49'	Stadium: Gillette Stadium; Referee: Adam Kilpatrick

October 21, 2020 15	South Georgia Tormenta FC	4–0	New England Revolution II	Statesboro, Georgia
7:00 PM EDT	Vinyals 18'; Phelps 29'; Arslan 34'; DeLoach (yellow card) 80'; Jambga 81'	Report	Bell (yellow card) 36'	Stadium: Eagle Field at Erk Russell Athletic Park; Attendance: 400; Referee: Kyle Johnston

October 24, 2020 16	Forward Madison FC	2–1	New England Revolution II	Madison, Wisconsin
7:00 PM EDT	Toyama (yellow card) 63', (goal) 83'; Fuson 81'; Banks (yellow card) 89'	Report	Rennicks 30'; Spaulding (yellow card) 57'; Souza (yellow card) 90+5'	Stadium: Breese Stevens Field; Referee: Alex Hofstetter
