= Emmanuel Boateng (footballer, born 1994) =

Ghanaian footballer (born 1994)

- Boateng with LA Galaxy in 2019

Personal information
- Full name: Emmanuel Agyenim Boateng
- Date of birth: 17 January 1994 (age 32)
- Place of birth: Accra, Ghana
- Height: 5 ft 6 in (1.68 m)
- Position: Winger

Team information
- Current team: San Diego FC
- Number: 24

Youth career
- 2006–2009: Right to Dream Academy
- Cate School

College career
Years	Team	Apps	(Gls)
2012	UC Santa Barbara Gauchos	18	(4)

Senior career*
Years	Team	Apps	(Gls)
2013	Ventura County Fusion	5	(1)
2013–2016	Helsingborgs IF	37	(4)
2016–2019	LA Galaxy	108	(9)
2019–2020	D.C. United	3	(0)
2020	Columbus Crew	10	(0)
2021–2024	New England Revolution	66	(6)
2025–	San Diego FC	13	(0)
- * Club domestic league appearances and goals as of 23:41, 2 January 2024 (UTC)

Emmanuel Agyenim "Ema" Boateng (born 17 January 1994) is a Ghanaian professional footballer who plays as a winger for Major League Soccer club San Diego FC.

== Early life and education ==
Boateng was born and raised in Ghana in a home that lacked running water and electricity. As a preteen, he was selected to join the Right to Dream Academy where he combined academic studies with football training.

In 2009 at the age of 15, Boateng moved to the United States on a scholarship to attend Cate School in Carpinteria, California. In addition to playing for the Cate School team, he also appeared for other local youth sides in Santa Barbara Soccer Club and South Coast Strikers. Boateng received the 2012 Gatorade Player of the Year award, presented to him by former winner Alexi Lalas, and became the first recipient in Cate School's 100+ year history across all sports. He skipped his final year of high school to enroll early at the University of California, Santa Barbara, despite interest from Manchester City F.C. to sign him on professional terms.

While at UCSB, Boateng played college soccer for the UC Santa Barbara Gauchos men's soccer team. In his first year in 2012, he appeared in 18 games, scoring 4 goals and adding 4 assists.

== Career ==
=== Helsingborg ===
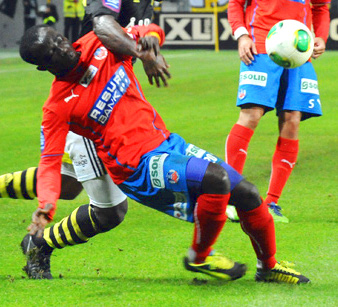
Boateng playing for Helsingborg

During the summer of 2013, he played with USL Premier Development League side Ventura County Fusion while still enrolled in college.

He appeared in 5 games for the Fusion, scoring once.

After receiving an invitation to train with the Swedish Allsvenskan side Helsingborgs IF later that summer, Boateng paid for his airplane ticket across the Atlantic Ocean to be able to visit the club. He made a big impression and soon thereafter they signed him to a three-and-a-half-year contract in July 2013. He would appear in 37 Allsvenskan matches over his three seasons with the club, scoring 4 times in the league. He also helped the club reach the Svenska Cupen final in 2014, scoring two goals in five appearances, and came on as a second-half substitute in the final itself; a 0–1 defeat to IF Elfsborg on 18 May.

=== LA Galaxy ===
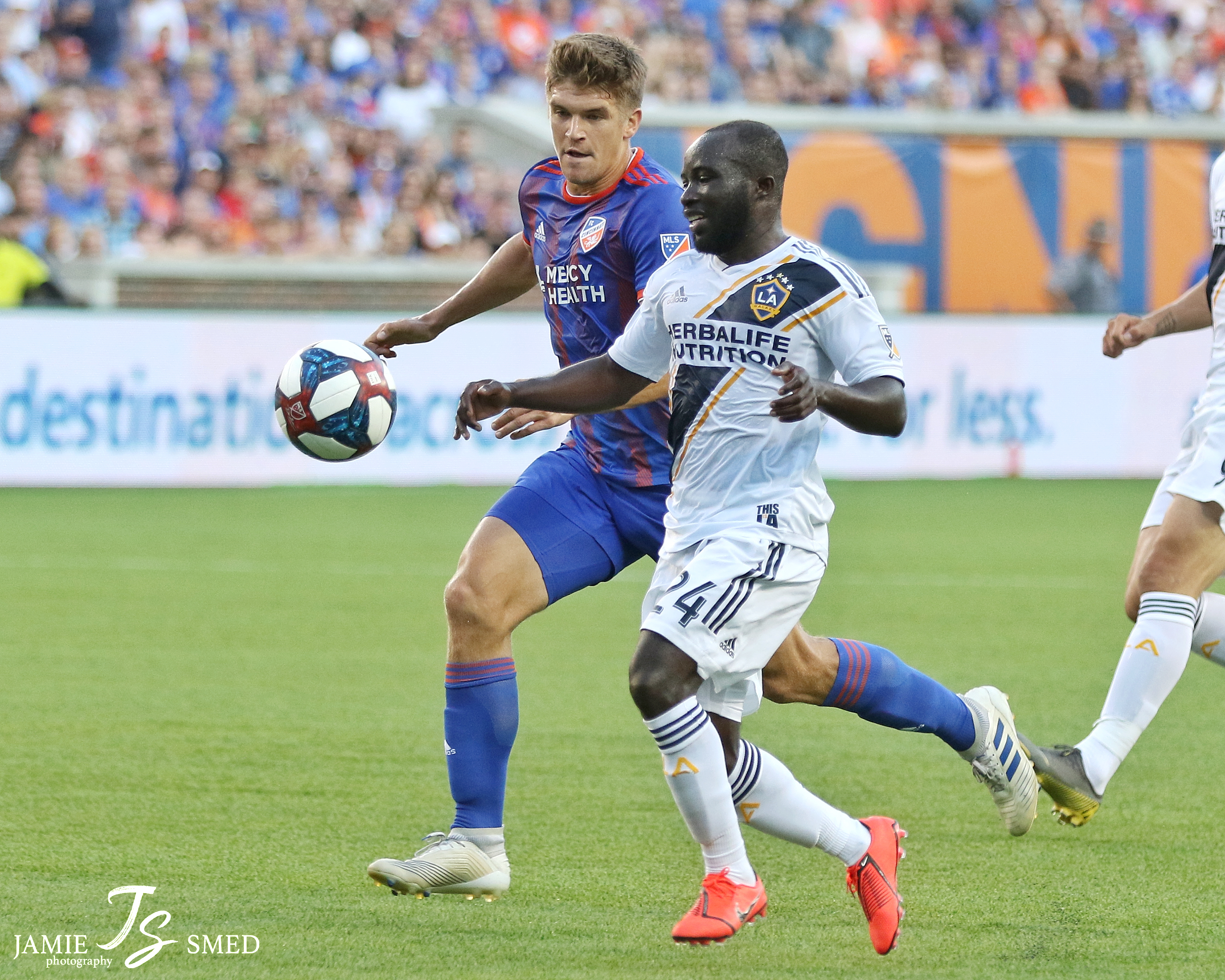
Boateng playing for LA Galaxy

Boateng was transferred to LA Galaxy of Major League Soccer in January 2016. He made his debut against the Colorado Rapids on 12 March 2016, where he replaced Mike Magee, but was unable to save the Galaxy from a 1–0 loss. He scored his first goal for the club on 23 April 2016 against Real Salt Lake, helping the Galaxy to a 5–2 victory, while also notching two assists. This performance earned him Player of the Week honors. Boateng scored his second goal of the season on 7 September, the first goal of a 3–3 draw at RSL.

During the 2016 MLS Cup Playoffs, in LA's knockout round match against Real Salt Lake, Boateng fouled Javier Morales, conceding a penalty which was successfully taken by Joao Plata to tie the game at 1. However, Boateng atoned for his mistake by scoring two goals within eight minutes, leading Galaxy to a 3–1 win. After the game, teammate Landon Donovan compared Boateng's first goal to Lionel Messi, saying that "he has that in him", while manager Bruce Arena described his performance as an "excellent, break out game".

Boateng's contract with LA Galaxy concluded at the end of their 2018 season. Boateng re-signed with Galaxy on 14 January 2019.

=== D.C. United ===
On 7 August 2019, Boateng was traded to D.C. United in exchange for $250,000 of Targeted Allocation Money. He made his first appearance for DC United in a game against the Vancouver Whitecaps FC on 17 August 2019, subbing in for Leonardo Jara in 67th minute. His 2020 option was exercised by D.C. United after the 2019 season.

=== Columbus Crew ===
On 14 August 2020, Boateng was traded to the Columbus Crew in exchange for Axel Sjöberg, reuniting him with former LA Galaxy teammate Gyasi Zardes. He made his debut on 20 August 2020, coming on as a substitute in a 3–0 win over the Chicago Fire. Later that season, he won the 2020 MLS Cup with Columbus. His fellow Ghanaian compatriots Jonathan Mensah and Harrison Afful played the full 90 minutes though. Columbus declined their contract option on Boateng following their 2020 season.

=== New England Revolution ===
On 7 January 2021, Boateng signed with New England Revolution as a free agent. Following the 2022 season, New England opted to decline his contract option. He re-signed with the club to a one-year contract on 24 February 2023, and again for an additional year on 2 January 2024.

=== San Diego FC ===
On 6 January 2025, Boateng was traded from New England to expansion side San Diego FC in exchange for $200,000 in general allocation money. He scored a goal in a 6–0 preseason friendly victory over New York Red Bulls on 16 February ahead of the team's inaugural season.

== Personal life ==
His story was featured in The Beautiful Game, a 2012 documentary about football in Africa, and on CNN's report on the Right to Dream Academy.

It was reported that Boateng received his U.S. citizenship in 2016.

Outside of football, Boateng's ambition is to become a doctor. He speaks three languages.

== Career statistics ==
As of match played 2 January 2024

Club	Season	League			Play-offs		National cup		Continental		Total	
Club	Season	Division	Apps	Goals	Apps	Goals	Apps	Goals	Apps	Goals	Apps	Goals
Helsingborgs IF	2013	Allsvenskan	4	0	—		5	2	—		9	2
Helsingborgs IF	2014	Allsvenskan	12	0	—		1	1	—		13	1
Helsingborgs IF	2015	Allsvenskan	21	4	—		1	0	—		22	4
Helsingborgs IF	Total		37	4	0	0	7	3	0	0	44	7
LA Galaxy	2016	MLS	26	2	2	2	4	0	2	0	34	4
LA Galaxy	2017	MLS	34	4	0	0	2	0	0	0	36	4
LA Galaxy	2018	MLS	27	2	0	0	2	0	0	0	29	2
LA Galaxy	2019	MLS	21	1	0	0	2	0	1	1	24	2
LA Galaxy	Total		108	9	2	2	10	0	3	1	124	12
D.C. United	2019	MLS	4	0	0	0	0	0	0	0	4	0
D.C. United	2020	MLS	0	0	0	0	0	0	0	0	0	0
D.C. United	Total		4	0	0	0	0	0	0	0	4	0
Columbus Crew	2020	MLS	10	0	0	0	0	0	0	0	10	0
New England Revolution	2021	MLS	12	2	1	0	0	0	0	0	13	2
New England Revolution	2022	MLS	27	2	0	0	2	0	2	0	31	2
New England Revolution	2023	MLS	27	2	2	0	2	0	1	0	32	2
New England Revolution	Total		66	6	3	0	4	0	3	0	76	6
San Diego FC	2025	MLS	13	0	0	0	2	0	0	0	0	0
Career total			238	21	5	2	21	3	6	1	273	25

== Honors ==
Columbus Crew

- MLS Cup: 2020

New England Revolution

- Supporters' Shield: 2021
