= Ian Harkes =

American soccer player (born 1995)

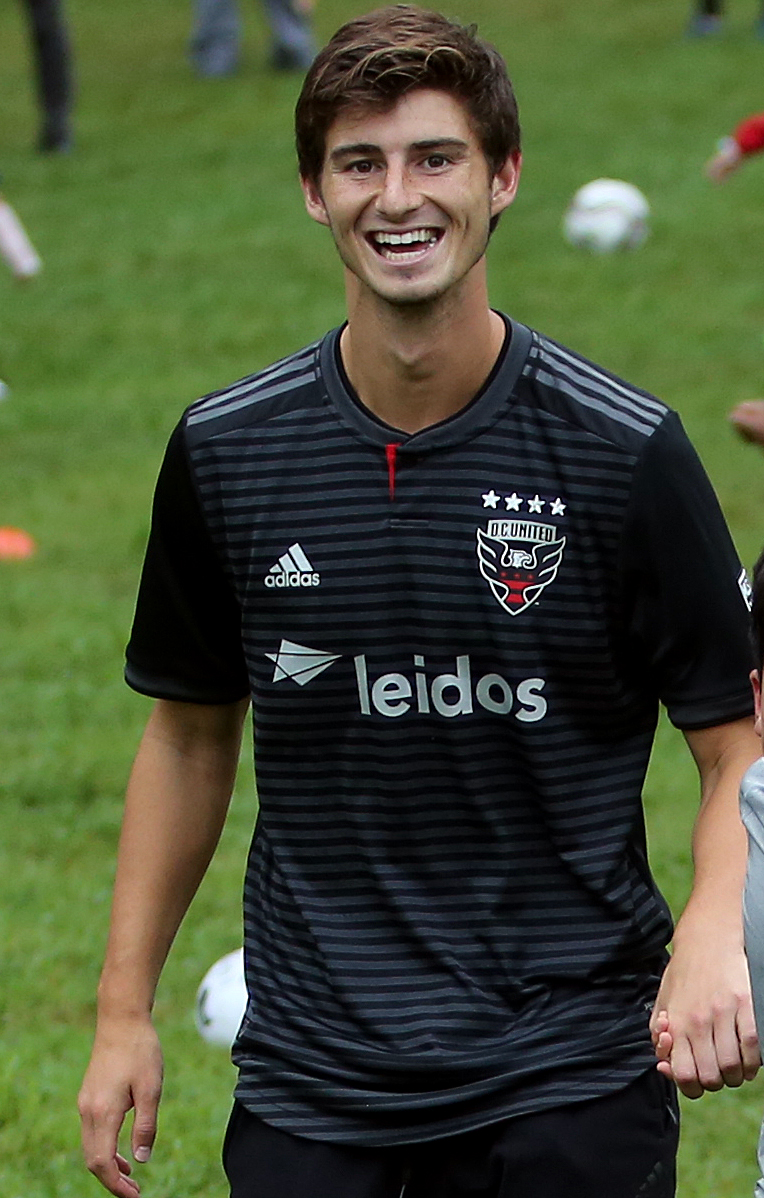
- Harkes with D.C. United in 2018

Personal information
- Full name: Ian Andrew Harkes
- Date of birth: March 30, 1995 (age 31)
- Place of birth: Derby, England
- Height: 5 ft 11 in (1.80 m)
- Position: Midfielder

Team information
- Current team: San Jose Earthquakes
- Number: 6

Youth career
- 2005–2013: D.C. United

College career
Years	Team	Apps	(Gls)
2013–2016	Wake Forest Demon Deacons	82	(9)

Senior career*
Years	Team	Apps	(Gls)
2017–2018	D.C. United	33	(2)
2019–2023	Dundee United	128	(7)
2023–2024	New England Revolution	36	(3)
2025–	San Jose Earthquakes	44	(2)

International career
2014	United States U20		
- * Club domestic league appearances and goals as of July 15, 2026

Ian Andrew Harkes (born March 30, 1995) is an American professional soccer player who plays as a midfielder for Major League Soccer club San Jose Earthquakes. He previously played for Dundee United F.C. in the Scottish Championship and Scottish Premiership as well as D.C. United in Major League Soccer. Harkes is a recipient of the MAC Hermann Trophy, which is awarded to the best college soccer player in the United States. He is the son of John Harkes, who captained the U.S. national soccer team during the 1990s.

== Early career ==
Harkes played high school soccer at Gonzaga College High School in Washington, D.C., and for the youth academy of D.C. United. While in D.C. United's academy, he served as the club captain for the U-18 and U-16 academy teams. During his junior and senior years at Gonzaga College High School, Harkes served as the varsity captain. He earned the team's Most Valuable Offensive Player in both 2011 and 2012.

His success with D.C. United's Academy setup and at Gonzaga High earned him several accolades. In 2011, Harkes was named the Gatorade Player of the Year in D.C. In 2012, he was selected as an NSCAA First Team High School All-American, and was selected to play in the High School All-American Game that year. In addition, he was named to the WCAC First Team, was named an All-Met by The Washington Post, and was selected twice to the NSCAA First Team All-South High School Region.

=== Collegiate ===
Ahead of the 2013 NCAA Division I men's soccer season, Harkes signed a National Letter of Intent to play for Wake Forest University. On August 30, 2013, he made his Wake Forest debut starting and playing 74 minutes in a 1–0 loss against Coastal Carolina. He earned his first collegiate points a week later, dishing out two assists against Boston College on September 7, 2013. He ended the 2013 campaign with 21 starts, a goal and seven assists. He was the only player on Wake Forest in 2013 to start and play in every match. Harkes was named to the All-ACC Freshman Team at the end of the season.

During his sophomore year, Harkes started and played in 16 matches with the Deacons including playing in all matches in the 2014 ACC Men's Soccer Tournament and 2014 NCAA Division I Men's Soccer Tournament. He finished his sophomore year with seven points off of two goals and three assists. At the end of the 2014 season, he was named to the All-ACC Second Team. Ahead of his junior year at Wake Forest, he was named the team captain for the Deacons. There, he played and started in all 22 matches the Deacons played that season, which involved a run into the round of 16 of the 2015 NCAA Division I Men's Soccer Tournament. Harkes ended the season by being named to the All-ACC First Team, the NSCAA All-South Region Second Team, and the 2015 ACC Men's Soccer Tournament All-Tournament team.

On January 6, 2017, Harkes was awarded the Hermann Trophy, awarded to the best college soccer player in the nation.

== Club career ==
=== D.C. United ===
On January 16, 2017, it was reported that Harkes had signed a homegrown contract with D.C. United of Major League Soccer. Before deciding to sign with United, he wanted to explore options with second-flight clubs in England: he undertook a week long trial at Derby County – one of his father's former sides – but was not offered a contract by the club. Harkes was then offered another short trial by Fulham which he declined instead choosing to return to the US. The club made the official announcement one week later, on January 23. On March 12, 2017, Harkes made his professional debut, playing a full 90 minutes in a 0–4 loss at New York City FC. He scored his first goal for United on June 13, 2017, in a U.S. Open Cup match against amateur side Christos FC. A few weeks later, he scored his first MLS goal in a 2–4 loss against FC Dallas.

During his second year with United, Harkes lost his starting role to Júnior Moreno and Russell Canouse, making only eight appearances during the 2018 season. He was released by D.C. United at the end of their 2018 season.

=== Dundee United ===
==== Scottish Championship ====
In January 2019, Harkes signed a two-year contract with Scottish Championship side Dundee United, noting that his Dundee-born grandfather had been a supporter of the club growing up. Four days later, Harkes made his Dundee United debut, coming on in the 70th minute of a 2018–19 Scottish Cup fourth round fixture against Montrose and scoring in the 92nd minute to complete a 4–0 win. On August 30, 2019, he scored Dundee United's fifth goal in a 6–2 win against city rivals Dundee in the Dundee derby. On April 15, 2020, because of the ongoing COVID-19 pandemic, Dundee United were awarded first place in the Scottish Championship, gaining the club and Harkes automatic promotion to the Scottish Premiership. He subsequently extended his contract with the club until 2022.

==== Scottish Premiership ====
Harkes made his debut in the Scottish Premiership for Dundee United in the first game of the season, playing 90 minutes against St Johnstone and was named in the Scottish Premiership team of the week for the first week of the season.

=== New England Revolution ===
Harkes signed for the 2023 season with Major League Soccer club New England Revolution on July 5, 2023. The deal additionally included two club options for 2024 and 2025. New England acquired Harkes' MLS rights from D.C. United by trading a 2024 MLS SuperDraft second-pick and a conditional $50,000 in General Allocation Money in 2025. In signing with the Revolution, Harkes became the second member of his family to play for soccer coach Bruce Arena, and the second to play for the New England Revolution, as Ian's father John Harkes represented the club from 1999 to 2001 and also played under Bruce Arena in college, professionally, and for the US Men's National Team.

Harkes made his first appearance for his new club on July 8, 2023, coming on as a 68th-minute substitute for Esmir Bajraktarevic in New England's 2–1 loss to New York Red Bulls.

On July 15, 2023, Harkes made his first start for the Revolution and additionally scored his first two goals for the club, in a 4–0 win against his former club, DC United. It was his first two-goal game in his professional career.

=== San Jose Earthquakes ===
Harkes, along with teammates Dave Romney and Mark-Anthony Kaye, were traded to the San Jose Earthquakes on December 2, 2024 for "around" $500,000 General allocation money and an international roster spot, reuniting Kaye with his former Revolution manager Bruce Arena.

== International career ==
Harkes has played for the United States men's national under-20 soccer team. On January 8, 2018, he received a call-up for the United States men's national soccer team for a friendly against Bosnia and Herzegovina. He is also eligible internationally for England through being born in Derby and Scotland via his Dundonian grandparentage.

== Personal life ==
Harkes is the son of former U.S. international, John Harkes. He is also the son of Cindi Harkes, who played collegiate soccer for Virginia and professionally in the USL W-League for the Maryland Pride and for Sheffield Wednesday Ladies. He has two younger sisters, Lauren and Lily. In high school, Ian Harkes was a member of the National Honor Society. He is of Scottish descent through his paternal grandparents.

Harkes' wife, Sarah Teegarden, also plays soccer. She signed for Scottish Women's Premier League team Celtic in January 2020.

== Career statistics ==
=== Club ===
As of match played October 19, 2024

Appearances and goals by club, season and competition
Club	Season	League			National cup (Note: Includes U.S. Open Cup, Scottish Cup)		League cup (Note: Includes Scottish League Cup)		Continental		Other		Total	
Club	Season	Division	Apps	Goals	Apps	Goals	Apps	Goals	Apps	Goals	Apps	Goals	Apps	Goals
D.C. United	2017	MLS	25	2	2	1	—		—		—		27	3
D.C. United	2018	MLS	8	0	2	1	—		—		0	0	10	1
D.C. United	Total		33	2	4	2	—		—		0	0	37	4
Dundee United	2018–19	Scottish Championship	13	0	3	1	0	0	—		4 (Note: Appearances in Scottish Premiership play-offs)	0	20	1
Dundee United	2019–20	Scottish Championship	26	2	2	0	2	0	—		1 (Note: Appearance in Scottish Challenge Cup)	0	31	2
Dundee United	2020–21	Scottish Premiership	35	1	4	0	4	1	—		—		43	2
Dundee United	2021–22	Scottish Premiership	28	3	3	1	6	0	—		—		37	4
Dundee United	2022–23	Scottish Premiership	26	1	1	0	1	1	2 (Note: Appearance in UEFA Europa Conference League)	0	4	1	34	3
Dundee United	Total		128	7	13	2	13	2	2	0	9	1	165	12
New England Revolution	2023	MLS	9	2	—		—		—		4 (Note: Appearances in Leagues Cup)	0	13	2
New England Revolution	2024	MLS	27	1	—		—		5 (Note: Appearances in CONCACAF Champions Cup)	0	0	0	32	1
New England Revolution	Total		36	3	0	0	0	0	5	0	4	0	45	3
Career total			197	12	17	4	13	2	7	0	13	1	247	19

== Honors ==
Dundee United

- Scottish Championship: 2019–20
