= 2021 New England Revolution season =

2021 soccer season for the New England Revolution

New England Revolution
2021 season
- President: Brian Bilello
- Head Coach: Bruce Arena
- Stadium: Gillette Stadium
- Major League Soccer: Conference: 1st Overall: 1st
- MLS Cup Playoffs: Conference Semifinals
- U.S. Open Cup: Canceled
- Biggest win: MIA 0–5 NE (7/21)
- Biggest defeat: NSH 2–0 NE (5/8); NYC 2–0 NE (8/28)
Home colors	Away colors

The 2021 season was the 26th in the history of the Major League Soccer club New England Revolution, a professional soccer team based in Foxborough, Massachusetts. The team was under the management of Bruce Arena in his second full MLS season as head coach of the Revs. The regular season began on April 17, 2021. In addition to the league, the Revolution were to compete in the 2021 U.S. Open Cup, before the competition was canceled due to the COVID-19 pandemic.

The 2021 season saw the Revolution win their first Supporters' Shield in club history by having the best record in the regular season. They were eliminated in the conference semifinals of the MLS Cup playoffs after losing to New York City FC in a shootout.

== Roster changes ==
=== Signings in ===
Date	Position	Name	From	Fee/notes	Ref.
December 19, 2020	GK	(United States) Earl Edwards Jr.	(United States) D.C. United	Free agent	
December 21, 2020	DF	(Colombia) Christian Mafla	(Colombia) Atlético Nacional	Transfer	
December 23, 2020	MF	(Cameroon) Wilfrid Kaptoum	(Spain) Real Betis	Free agent	
January 7, 2021	FW	(Ghana) Emmanuel Boateng	(United States) Columbus Crew	Free agent	
January 7, 2021	DF	(Guam) A. J. DeLaGarza	(United States) Inter Miami CF	Free agent	
March 16, 2021	FW	(Iceland) Arnór Traustason	(Sweden) Malmö FF	Transfer	
March 22, 2021	MF	(Brazil) Maciel	(United States) New England Revolution II	Free transfer	
March 22, 2021	DF	(United States) Jon Bell	(United States) New England Revolution II	Free transfer	

=== Out ===
Date	Position	Name	To	Fee	Ref.
December 8, 2020	CB	(Slovenia) Antonio Delamea Mlinar	(Slovenia) Olimpija Ljubljana	Released	
December 8, 2020	FW	(Ecuador) Cristian Penilla	Free Agent	Released	
December 8, 2020	MF	(United States) Diego Fagúndez	(United States) Austin FC	Released	
December 8, 2020	MF	(Puerto Rico) Isaac Angking	Free Agent	Released	
December 8, 2020	GK	(United States) Jeff Caldwell	(United States) Hartford Athletic	Released	
December 8, 2020	FW	(The Gambia) Kekuta Manneh	(United States) Austin FC	Released	
December 8, 2020	MF	(United States) Kelyn Rowe	(United States) Seattle Sounders FC	Released	
December 8, 2020	MF	(United States) Lee Nguyen	(Vietnam) Ho Chi Minh City	Released	
December 8, 2020	DF	(England) Michael Mancienne	(England) Burton Albion	Released	
December 8, 2020	MF	(Brazil) Nicolas Firmino	Free Agent	Released	
December 8, 2020	DF	(United States) Seth Sinovic	Free Agent	Released	

== Current squad ==
As of August 19, 2021

No.	Pos.	Nation	Player
2	DF	USA	Andrew Farrell
4	DF	USA	Henry Kessler (GA)
5	MF	CMR	Wilfrid Kaptoum
6	MF	USA	Scott Caldwell (HG)
7	FW	ARG	Gustavo Bou (DP)
8	MF	USA	Matt Polster
9	FW	POL	Adam Buksa (DP)
10	FW	USA	Teal Bunbury
11	MF	GHA	Emmanuel Boateng
12	FW	USA	Justin Rennicks (HG)
13	MF	BRA	Maciel
15	DF	USA	Brandon Bye
17	FW	CAN	Tajon Buchanan (GA)
18	GK	USA	Brad Knighton
19	FW	UGA	Edward Kizza
22	MF	ESP	Carles Gil (DP)
23	DF	USA	Jon Bell
24	DF	USA	DeJuan Jones
25	FW	ISL	Arnór Traustason
26	MF	USA	Tommy McNamara
27	MF	COL	Luis Caicedo
28	DF	GUM	A. J. DeLaGarza
30	GK	USA	Matt Turner
32	DF	COL	Christian Mafla
35	DF	USA	Collin Verfurth
36	GK	USA	Earl Edwards Jr.
72	MF	USA	Damian Rivera (HG)

== Results ==
=== Preseason ===
March 27	LA Galaxy	1–0	New England Revolution	Carson, California
	Perez 22'; Zubak (yellow card) 45+1'	Report		Stadium: Dignity Health Sports Park

March 31	LA Galaxy	1–4	New England Revolution	Carson, California
	Barajas 28'	Report	Buksa 6'; Bunbury 23'; McNamara 64'; Bou 67'	Stadium: Dignity Health Sports Park

April 3	Los Angeles FC	2–2	New England Revolution	Los Angeles, California
	Atuesta 63'; Rossi 90'	Report	Bou 46'; Buksa 49'	Stadium: Banc of California Stadium

=== Regular season ===
April 17 1	Chicago Fire FC	2–2	New England Revolution	Chicago, Illinois
8:30 PM EDT	Berić 5'; Stojanović 11'; Kappelhof (yellow card) 79'	Report	Buksa 14'; Bou 27'; Jones (red card) 90+2'	Stadium: Soldier Field; Attendance: 8,102; Referee: Fotis Bazakos

April 24 2	New England Revolution	1–0	D.C. United	Foxborough, Massachusetts
8:00 p.m. EDT	Traustason (yellow card) 32'; Bye 48'; Kaptoum (yellow card) 60'; Farrell (yellow card) 80'; Buksa (yellow card) 89'	Report	Canouse (yellow card) 24'; Moreno (yellow card) 58'; Hines-Ike (yellow card) 90+4'	Stadium: Gillette Stadium; Attendance: 7,905; Referee: Guido Gonzales Jr.

May 1 3	New England Revolution	2–1	Atlanta United FC	Foxborough, Massachusetts
7:00 p.m. EDT	Bye 19' (yellow card) 75'; Gil 53'; Polster (yellow card) 90+3'	Report	Mulraney (yellow card) 17'; Franco (yellow card) 29'; Sosa (yellow card) 33'; Moreno 43'	Stadium: Gillette Stadium; Referee: Chris Penso

May 8 4	Nashville SC	2–0	New England Revolution	Nashville, Tennessee
1:30 p.m. EDT	Sapong 25'; Lovitz (yellow card) 28'; Muyl 75'; Godoy (yellow card) 90+3'	Report	Jones (yellow card) 57'	Stadium: Nissan Stadium; Attendance: 12,510; Referee: Victor Rivas

May 12 5	Philadelphia Union	1–1	New England Revolution	Philadelphia, Pennsylvania
7:30 p.m. EDT	Wagner (yellow card) 34'; Monteiro (yellow card) 53'; Przybyłko (yellow card) 71' (goal) 88'	Report	Bunbury 85'; Bye (yellow card) 90+1'	Stadium: Subaru Park; Attendance: 5,000; Referee: Tori Penso

May 16 6	New England Revolution	1–0	Columbus SC	Foxborough, Massachusetts
6:00 p.m. EDT	Buksa 86'	Report		Stadium: Gillette Stadium

May 22 7	New England Revolution	3–1	New York Red Bulls	Foxborough, Massachusetts
8:00 p.m. EDT	Bou 36'; Buchanan 45+2'; Buksa 82'	Report	Reyes 07' (yellow card) 31' (yellow-red card) 38'	Stadium: Gillette Stadium; Referee: Jair Marrufo

May 29 8	FC Cincinnati	0–1	New England Revolution	Cincinnati, Ohio
3:00 p.m. EDT	Stanko (yellow card) 9'; Kubo (yellow card) 69'	Report	Buchanan (yellow card) 33'; Kessler (yellow card) 66'; Buksa 70'	Stadium: TQL Stadium; Attendance: 11,000; Referee: Dave Gantar

June 19 9	New York City FC	2–3	New England Revolution	Harrison, New Jersey
7:30 p.m. EDT	Castellanos (yellow card) 39'; Thiago 55' (yellow card) 56'; Sands (yellow card) 77'; Tajouri-Shradi 85'	Report	Polster (yellow card) 19'; Bou 27'; Maciel (yellow card) 53'; Bell 78'; McNamara 88'	Stadium: Red Bull Arena; Attendance: 4,929; Referee: Allen Chapman
Note: The match was held at Red Bull Arena due to scheduling conflicts at New York City FC's home stadium, Yankee Stadium. New York City FC played as the home team for this match.

June 23 10	New England Revolution	3–2	New York Red Bulls	Foxborough, Massachusetts
7:00 p.m. EDT	Buchanan 26'; Polster (yellow card) 29'; Jones 35'; Bou 52'	Report	Duncan (yellow card) 29'; Klimala 53'; Reyes 75'	Stadium: Gillette Stadium; Referee: Robert Sibiga

June 27 11	FC Dallas	2–1	New England Revolution	Frisco, Texas
9:00 p.m. EDT	Pepi 11', 54'		Bou 33'	Stadium: Toyota Stadium

July 3 12	Columbus Crew	2–2	New England Revolution	Columbus, Ohio
5:00 p.m. EDT	Zardes 39'; Nagbe (yellow card) 68'; Farrell 69' (o.g.); Mensah (yellow card) 75'; Santos (yellow card) 79'	Report	Buchanan 13'; Bou 30'; Jones (yellow card) 53'	Stadium: Lower.com Field; Attendance: 20,407; Referee: Alan Kelly

July 7 13	New England Revolution	2–3	Toronto FC	Foxborough, Massachusetts
8:32PM EDT	Gil 56'; McNamara (yellow card) 75'; Buksa 78'	Report	Soteldo 9'; Lawrence 15'; Endoh 24'; Delgado (yellow card) 55'; Pozuelo (yellow card) 89'	Stadium: Gillette Stadium; Referee: Rosendo Mendoza
Note: The match was originally scheduled for 7:00PM, but was postponed due to lightning.

July 17 14	Atlanta United FC	0–1	New England Revolution	Atlanta, Georgia
5:00 p.m. EDT	Franco (yellow card) 69'; Conway (yellow card) 75'	Report	Bou 18'; Kessler (yellow card) 77'	Stadium: Mercedes-Benz Stadium; Attendance: 42,517; Referee: Victor Rivas

July 21 15	Inter Miami CF	0–5	New England Revolution	Fort Lauderdale, Florida
7:30 p.m. EDT	Figal (yellow card) 15'; Chapman (yellow card) 62'	Report	Traustason 15', 36'; Bunbury 27'; Buksa 45+4', 83'	Stadium: DRV PNK Stadium; Attendance: 13,963; Referee: Robert Sibiga

July 25 16	New England Revolution	2–1	CF Montréal	Foxborough, Massachusetts
6:00 p.m. EDT	Bou 29', 73'	Report	Mihailovic 79'	Stadium: Gillette Stadium; Attendance: 18,217; Referee: Alex Chilowicz

July 31 17	New York Red Bulls	2–3	New England Revolution	Harrison, New Jersey
6:00 p.m. EDT	Carmona 8'; Fábio 63'	Report	Bou 60'; Bye 84'; Buksa 90+1'	Stadium: Red Bull Arena; Attendance: 13,444; Referee: Ramy Touchan

August 4 18	New England Revolution	0–0	Nashville SC	Foxborough, Massachusetts
7:00 p.m. EDT	Bou (yellow card) 34'; Farrell (yellow card) 37'; Kaptoum (yellow card) 48'	Report	LaGrassa (yellow card) 33'	Stadium: Gillette Stadium; Attendance: 10,279; Referee: Silviu Petrescu

August 8 19	New England Revolution	2–1	Philadelphia Union	Foxborough, Massachusetts
6:00 p.m. EDT	Polster 10'; Bou 39'; McNamara (yellow card) 69'; Bunbury (yellow card) 90+3'	Report	Mbaizo (yellow card) 22'; Aaronson 31'; Elliott (yellow card) 54'; Wagner (yellow card) 84'	Stadium: Gillette Stadium; Attendance: 17,054; Referee: Armando Villarreal

August 14 20	Toronto FC	1–2	New England Revolution	Toronto, Ontario
8:00 p.m. EDT	Delgado (yellow card) 48'; Osorio 79'	Report	Buchanan 20'; Bye (yellow card) 63'; Bou 83' (pen.)	Stadium: BMO Field; Referee: Rubiel Vazquez

August 18 21	New England Revolution	3–2	D.C. United	Foxborough, Massachusetts
7:00 p.m. EDT	McNamara 49'; Buchanan 53'; Traustason (yellow card) 33' (yellow-red card) 72'; Jones 85'	Report	Arriola 10'; Ábila 90+6'	Stadium: Gillette Stadium; Attendance: 11,419; Referee: Ted Unkel

August 21 22	New England Revolution	4–1	FC Cincinnati	Foxborough, Massachusetts
8:00 p.m. EDT	Buchanan 7', (yellow card) 73'; Boateng 21'; Buksa 33', 61'; McNamara (yellow card) 68'; Farrell (yellow card) 86'	Report	Brenner 54'	Stadium: Gillette Stadium; Attendance: 18,268; Referee: Fotis Bazakos

August 28 23	New York City FC	2–0	New England Revolution	New York, New York
7:30 p.m. EDT	Castellanos 31', 55'; Rodríguez (yellow card) 37'; Sands (yellow card) 40'; Chanot (yellow card) 45+2'; Þórarinsson (yellow card) 87'; Jasson (yellow card) 90+3'	Report	Farrell (yellow card) 45+3'; Polster (yellow card) 86'	Stadium: Yankee Stadium; Referee: Kevin Stott

September 3 24	Philadelphia Union	0–1	New England Revolution	Chester, Pennsylvania
7:30 p.m. EDT	Harriel (yellow card) 33'; Bedoya (yellow card) 71'; Sullivan (yellow card) 77'; Fontana (yellow card) 80'; Aaronson (yellow card) 89'	Report	Polster 33'; Traustason (yellow card) 55' (yellow-red card) 59'; Kessler (yellow card) 90+3'	Stadium: Subaru Park; Attendance: 15,152; Referee: Jair Marrufo

September 11 25	New England Revolution	2–1	New York City FC	Foxborough, Massachusetts
7:00 p.m. EDT	Boateng 21'; Kessler (yellow card) 63'; Buksa (yellow card) 64'; Buchanan 65'; Polster (yellow card) 90'; Gil (yellow card) 90+3'	Report	Rodríguez 11'; Morales (yellow card) 45+2' (yellow-red card) 53'; Castellanos (yellow card) 52'; Thiago (yellow card) 74'	Stadium: Gillette Stadium; Attendance: 19,481; Referee: Chris Penso

September 18 26	New England Revolution	1–1	Columbus Crew	Foxborough, Massachusetts
7:00 p.m. EDT	Buksa 62'	Report	Zardes 58'; Abdul-Salaam (yellow card) 65'; Parente (yellow card) 77'	Stadium: Gillette Stadium; Attendance: 19,004; Referee: Allen Chapman

September 22 27	Chicago Fire FC	2–3	New England Revolution	Chicago, Illinois
8:00 PM EDT	Terán (yellow card) 17', (goal) 40'; Medrán (yellow card) 34'; Giménez 63'	Report	Kessler 11'; Caldwell (yellow card) 31'; Bunbury 62'; Gil 90+1', (yellow card) 90+1'	Stadium: Soldier Field; Attendance: 7,052; Referee: Lukasz Szpala

September 25 28	New England Revolution	2–1	Orlando City SC	Foxborough, Massachusetts
7:00 p.m. EDT	Buksa 9'; Schlegel 35' (o.g.); Buchanan (yellow card) 80'	Report	Dike 18'; Michel (yellow card) 19'; Jansson (yellow card) 39'	Stadium: Gillette Stadium; Attendance: 23,506; Referee: Rosendo Mendoza

September 29 29	CF Montréal	1–4	New England Revolution	Montreal, Quebec
7:30 p.m. EDT	Piette (yellow card) 27'; Torres 32'; Miller (yellow card) 90'	Report	Jones 10'; Buksa 17'; Camacho 30' (o.g.); Bou (yellow card) 58', (goal) 86'; Caicedo (yellow card) 90+2'	Stadium: Saputo Stadium; Referee: Ismail Elfath

October 16 30	New England Revolution	2–2	Chicago Fire FC	Foxborough, Massachusetts
7:00 p.m. EDT	Kaptoum 47'; Bou 76'; Buchanan (yellow card) 90+3'	Report	Medrán 49'; F. Navarro (yellow card) 60'; Aliseda 88'; M. Navarro (yellow card) 90+3'	Stadium: Gillette Stadium; Attendance: 28,414; Referee: Joseph Dickerson

October 20 31	D.C. United	2–3	New England Revolution	Washington D.C.
8:00 p.m. EDT	Felipe (yellow card) 18'; Robertha 53'; Ábila 90+3'	Report	Polster (yellow card) 45'; Buksa 61'; Gil 64'; Bou 79'	Stadium: Audi Field; Attendance: 13,387; Referee: Nima Saghafi

October 24 32	Orlando City SC	2–2	New England Revolution	Orlando, Florida
7:30 PM	Nani 39'; Mueller (yellow card) 47'; Dike 50' (pen.)	Report	Buksa 81', 90+3'; Gil (yellow card) 87'	Stadium: Exploria Stadium; Attendance: 17,539; Referee: Chris Penso

October 27 33	New England Revolution	1–0	Colorado Rapids	Foxborough, Massachusetts
7:00 p.m. EDT	Buchanan 74'	Report	Abubakar (yellow card) 15'; Rubio (yellow card) 53'; Esteves (yellow card) 90+2'	Stadium: Gillette Stadium; Attendance: 10,199; Referee: Victor Rivas

November 7 34	New England Revolution	0–1	Inter Miami CF	Foxborough, Massachusetts
3:30 p.m. EST	Kessler (yellow card) 34'	Report	Shea (yellow card) 39'; Matuidi 58'; Carranza (yellow card) 63'; Pizarro (yellow card) 64'	Stadium: Gillette Stadium; Attendance: 31,635; Referee: Alan Kelly

=== MLS Cup Playoffs ===
November 30 Eastern Conference Semifinals	New England Revolution	2–2 (a.e.t.) (3–5 p)	New York City FC	Foxborough, Massachusetts
6:30 PM EST	Buksa 9'; Buchanan 118'	Report	Rodríguez 3'; Castellanos 109'	Stadium: Gillette Stadium; Attendance: 25,509; Referee: Drew Fischer
	Penalties
	Gil (penalty scored); Buksa (penalty missed); Bunbury (penalty scored); Jones (penalty scored)		(penalty scored) Morales; (penalty scored) Andrade; (penalty scored) Tajouri-Shradi; (penalty scored) Moralez; (penalty scored) Callens
Note: New York City FC advance on penalties 5–3.
