= Gustavo Bou =

Argentine footballer (born 1990)

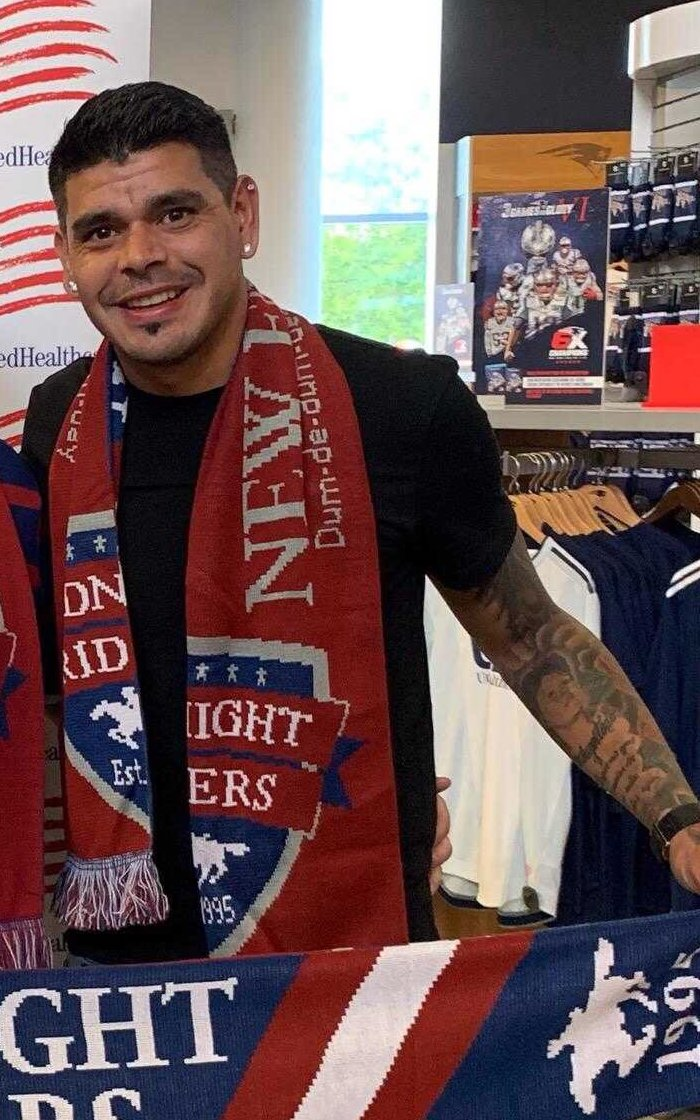
- Bou with the New England Revolution in 2019

Personal information
- Full name: Gustavo Leonardo Bou
- Date of birth: 18 February 1990 (age 36)
- Place of birth: Concordia, Entre Ríos, Argentina
- Height: 1.76 m (5 ft 9 in)
- Position: Forward

Youth career
- River Plate

Senior career*
Years	Team	Apps	(Gls)
2008–2014	River Plate	30	(3)
2012–2013	→ Olimpo (loan)	33	(8)
2013–2014	→ LDU Quito (loan)	20	(4)
2014	→ Gimnasia (loan)	13	(1)
2014–2017	Racing Club	75	(33)
2017–2019	Tijuana	49	(20)
2018	→ Racing Club (loan)	8	(1)
2019–2023	New England Revolution	100	(44)
2024	Talleres	9	(1)
- * Club domestic league appearances and goals as of 30:20, 20 May 2024 (UTC)

Gustavo Leonardo Bou (/boʊ/ BOH, Spanish: [ɡusˈtaβo leoˈnaɾðo ˈβow]; born 18 February 1990) is a former Argentine professional footballer who played as a forward.

Bou's professional career began in 2008 at the age of 18 with River Plate, under coach Diego Simeone. During his career he has played in Argentina, Ecuador, Mexico and the United States.

While playing in Argentina, Bou was on the team that won the 2007–08 Toreno Clasura tournament, the 2011–12 Primera B Nacional with River Plate, the 2014 Torneo Transición and 2018–19 Primera División with Racing Club de Avellaneda. He was the top goal scorer in the 2015 Copa Libertadores with eight goals.

Bou is often referred to by his nickname La Pantera ("The Panther"). He has a tattoo of a panther on his left arm in honor of the moniker. When asked about its meaning in a 2019 interview, Bou compared his playing style to that of a panther, saying, "A panther is always ready to pounce on an opportunity [...] A panther does not leave. It hides."

== Career ==
=== River Plate ===
Bou started his career in the youth ranks of Club Comunicaciones Concordia. At the age of 14, he joined River Plate's reserve team, where manager Diego Simeone later offered him a contract to join the senior team. On 23 March 2008, Bou made his debut for River Plate against Vélez Sarsfield, coming on for Mauro Rosales in the 43rd minute of the match.

While Bou was with River Plate, he was called up for the 2007 U-17 World Cup in South Korea, but was unable to participate due to a partial tear of a lateral ligament and meniscus.

Bou scored his first goal in a match against Newell's Old Boys on the 12th week of the Torneo Apertura 2008. He played sparingly during the 2010-11 season, and the team was later relegated to Primera B Nacional (Argentina's second division).

=== Olimpo ===
At the beginning of the 2012–13 Primera B Nacional season, Club Olimpo signed Bou on a loan. He debuted on 27 August 2012 against Gimnasia y Esgrima de Jujuy. In week 4, he scored his first goal for Olimpo.

=== Liga de Quito ===
Bou signed with Liga de Quito, on loan from River Plate, for the second round of the 2013 Campeonato Ecuatoriano de Fútbol Serie A, scoring his first brace (two goals in the same match) on 21 July against Barcelona Guayaquil.

=== Gimnasia La Plata ===
At the beginning of 2014, Bou signed with Gimnasia La Plata on a six-month loan from River Plate. At the end of the loan, he became a free agent.

=== Racing Club ===
==== 2014 season ====
In August 2014, Bou signed as a free agent with Racing Club. This was a controversial move, as both Cocca and Bou were represented by the same agent, Christian Bragarnik. He played his first match on 26 August against Arsenal de Sarandí. Bou scored his first goal with Racing on 22 September against Newell's Old Boys.

==== 2015 season ====
On 17 January 2015, Bou scored the first hat-trick (three goals in the same match) of his career against Boca Juniors in the Summer Tournament held in the city of Mar del Plata, and also won the player of the match award for that performance.

Bou made his Libertadores Cup debut against Deportivo Tachira where he was named the best player of the match for his hat trick and two assists.

==== 2016 season ====
In the summer before the 2016 season, Bou refused to practice with the club after Blanco rejected a $5 million offer from Borussia Mönchengladbach. Bou reached an agreement with Racing to be sold if an $8 million offer was made for his contract. Later, Racing rejected an $8 million bid from Chinese Super League club Beijing Guoan for Bou, who voiced his frustration with Racing president Víctor Blanco for violating the agreement by rejecting the offer. Blanco later clarified that the $8 million figure was an after-tax amount and that Racing would therefore need an offer in the $10 million range, however, Bou did not agree with that interpretation.

Although he continued to be a Racing player, he stopped making appearances later in the season due to injuries and conflicts with the president of Racing Víctor Blanco.

==== 2016-17 season ====
Despite the controversy over his contract, and with some changes in the club's staff, Bou signed a new contract expiring in 2020.

=== Tijuana de Mexico (2017–2018) ===
On 26 June 2017, Bou joined Liga MX side Tijuana. On his decision to join "Xolos", Bou stated "I made my decision after the coaching staff called and made it clear it wanted to bring me here and the effort the front office made to get me here. I really value that." According to various Argentine media sources, Tijuana paid roughly $7 million for Bou's transfer. During his time in Mexico, he played 36 games, scored 10 goals and made six assists.

=== Second stint at Racing Club ===
==== 2018–2019 season ====
In 2018, Racing Club brought Bou in on loan for one year for $2 million to replace Lautaro Martínez, who had just joined Inter Milan.

His first game was played against his former team, River Plate, for the 2018 Copa Libertadores. On 31 March 2019, he was awarded champion with Racing Club for the second time, even though he was no longer in the club. In the 2018–2019 season he scored only one goal and made three assists.

=== Return to Tijuana ===
In 2019, Gustavo surprised many when he terminated his contract with Racing and returned to Tijuana. During this stint he played 19 games, scoring 11 goals.

=== New England Revolution ===
==== 2019 Season ====
On 10 July 2019, Bou signed as a designated player with the New England Revolution for a club-record transfer fee, reportedly in the $6–7 million range. The Boston Globe reported that the deal included $12 million in transfer fees and guaranteed compensation; and could rise to "exceed $16 million" with bonuses and options.

Bou made his Revolution debut on 17 July 2019, and scored his first goal for the club, in a 4–0 victory over Vancouver Whitecaps. On 27 July, he scored his second MLS goal, in the 3rd minute of the match, against Orlando City SC. It was the fastest goal of the Revolution's season, and was nominated for MLS Goal of the Week. In that match, Bou also tied a single-game club record for most shots, with 9. On 29 September, Bou recording a game-winning assist against New York City FC to help the Revolution clinch a spot in the 2019 MLS Cup Playoffs, the club's first playoff appearance since 2015.

Bou concluded the 2019 season with nine goals and two assists in 14 appearances. His strike against the Chicago Fire was a finalist for MLS Goal of the Year, and he finished 5th in MLS Newcomer of the Year voting.

==== 2020 Season ====
Bou scored 5 goals and recorded 3 assists in 18 appearances in the 2020 regular season.

In Play-in round of the 2020 MLS Cup Playoffs, Bou scored the game-winning goal against the Montreal Impact in the 95th minute of the match. In the Eastern Conference semifinals, Bou scored twice to help the Revolution secure a 3–1 victory over Orlando City SC on 29 November. In doing so, he became only the third-ever Revolution player to record a postseason brace, and became only the second player in club history to record a brace in the MLS Cup Playoffs, joining Charlie Davies, who recorded the feat on two occasions. Bou paid tribute to Diego Maradona after his second goal, laying an Argentine flag on the ground, pointing towards the sky, and kissing the flag.

==== 2021 Season ====
In 2021, Bou made 25 starts (30 total appearances) for the Revolution, and recorded fifteen goals and 9 assists. Bou's strike against Montreal Impact in matchweek 15 was named MLS goal of the Week. He was named to the MLS Team of the Week following his one-goal, one assist performance against the New York Red Bulls on 22 May, and again on 31 July following his brace against Montreal. Bou was named MLS Player of the Month for the month of July after scoring five goals in six matches. Bou received MLS Best XI honors for the 2021 season, and additionally received 2021 MLS All-Star honors.

==== 2022 Season ====
In 2022, Bou missed thirteen matches with various injuries, but still won the Revolution Golden Boot award, leading the team in scoring with 8 goals and 2 assists.

On 28 May, Bou converted a penalty against the Philadelphia Union. The goal was the Bou's 30th with the club in regular season play, and the 10th-most in Revolution history.

==== 2023 Season ====
Bou opened his 2023 scoring account on 18 March against Nashville SC, and was subsequently named to the MLS Team of the Matchday. On 3 August, in the 2023 Leagues Cup Round of 32, Bou recorded a brace and converted a penalty to help the Revolution defeat Atlas F.C. Bou missed six weeks of the season with a "right leg injury," but made his return on 30 September against Charlotte FC.

On 21 October 2023, Bou made his 100th MLS regular season appearance for the Revolution, and scored his second brace, which brought his goal total with the club to 50. The brace also brought Bou to 44 regular season goals, which were the second most by a Revolution player through his first 100 games played, behind only Taylor Twellman.

=== Club Atlético Talleres ===
In January 2024, Bou moved to Club Atlético Talleres after his contract with the Revolution expired. Bou announced his retirement via his Instagram in August 2024.

=== Post-retirement ===
After retirement Bou has gone back to his former childhood amateur Club Defensores del Barrio Nebel in Argentina. He currently serves as the club's technical director and president.

== Career statistics ==
=== Club ===
As of match played 19 May 2024

Appearances and goals by club, season and competition
Club	Season	League			Cup		Continental		Other		Total	
Club	Season	Division	Apps	Goals	Apps	Goals	Apps	Goals	Apps	Goals	Apps	Goals
River Plate	2007–08	Argentine Primera División	1	0	—		0	0	—		1	0
River Plate	2008–09	Argentine Primera División	10	1	—		1 (Note: Appearance(s) in Copa Sudamericana)	0	—		11	1
River Plate	2009–10	Argentine Primera División	13	1	—		2 (Note: Appearance(s) in Copa Libertadores)	1	—		15	2
River Plate	2010–11	Argentine Primera División	0	0	—		—		—		0	0
River Plate	2011–12	Primera Nacional	6	0	0	0	—		—		6	0
River Plate	Total		30	2	0	0	3	1	0	0	33	3
Olimpo (loan)	2012–13	Primera Nacional	33	8	2	0	—		—		35	8
LDU Quito (loan)	2013	Ecuadorian Serie A	20	4	—		—		—		20	4
Gimnasia (loan)	2013–14	Argentine Primera División	13	1	—		—		—		13	1
Racing Club	2014	Argentine Primera División	15	10	1	0	—		—		16	10
Racing Club	2015	Argentine Primera División	30	9	3	2	10	8	—		43	19
Racing Club	2016	Argentine Primera División	8	4	3	0	6	2	1 (Note: Appearance(s) in Copa Bicentenario)	0	18	6
Racing Club	2016–17	Argentine Primera División	22	10	—		1	0	—		23	10
Tijuana	2017–18	Liga MX	33	10	3	0	0	0	—		36	10
Tijuana	2018–19	Liga MX	16	10	3	1	—		—		19	11
Tijuana	Total		49	20	6	1	0	0	0	0	55	21
Racing Club (loan)	2018–19	Argentine Primera División	8	1	0	0	2	0	—		10	1
Racing Club (loan)	Racing total		83	34	7	2	19	10	1	0	110	46
New England Revolution	2019	MLS	14	9	0	0	—		1 (Note: Appearance(s) in MLS Cup Playoffs)	0	15	9
New England Revolution	2020	MLS	18 (Note: Includes three appearances and one goal in MLS is Back Tournament group stage)	5	—		—		5 (Note: One appearance in MLS is Back Tournament knockout stage, four appearances and three goals in MLS Cup Playoffs)	3	23	8
New England Revolution	2021	MLS	30	15	—		—		1	0	31	15
New England Revolution	2022	MLS	19	8	1	0	2 (Note: Appearance(s) in CONCACAF Champions League)	0	—		22	8
New England Revolution	2023	MLS	19	7	0	0	—		5 (Note: Three appearances and three goals in Leagues Cup, two appearances and one goal in MLS Cup Playoffs)	4	24	11
New England Revolution	Total		100	44	1	0	2	0	12	7	115	51
Talleres	2024	Argentine Primera División	9	1	1	0	3	1	—		13	2
Career total			337	114	17	3	26	12	13	7	394	136

== Style of play ==
Throughout his career Bou demonstrated flexibility across the front line playing as a center forward, attacking midfielder/second striker, and even on the left wing. Instead of using physical dominance, Bou used smart movement and unpredictability to get past defenders.

ESPN has described Bou as "all power and thrust" and built like a boxer. Tim Vickery notes how the racing strike partnership with between Gustavo Bou and Diego Milito exploited space on the counter.

== Honours ==
River Plate

- Argentine Primera División: 2007–08 (Clausura)
- Primera B Nacional: 2011–12

Racing Club

- Argentine Primera División: 2014

New England Revolution

- Supporters' Shield: 2021

=== Individual ===
- 2015 Copa Libertadores top scorer (8 goals)
- MLS All-Star: 2021
- MLS Player of the Month: July 2021
- MLS Best XI: 2021
- 2022 New England Revolution Golden boot award (8 goals)

== Personal life ==
Bou is married and has two daughters. He is also the older brother of fellow footballer Walter Bou.
