= Henry Kessler (soccer) =

American soccer player (born 1998)

Personal information
- Full name: Frederick Henry Kessler
- Date of birth: June 25, 1998 (age 28)
- Place of birth: New York City, New York, US
- Height: 6 ft 4 in (1.93 m)
- Position: Center-back

Team information
- Current team: Charlotte FC
- Number: 22

Youth career
- 2011–2015: New York Red Bulls
- 2015–2017: Beachside SC

College career
Years	Team	Apps	(Gls)
2017–2019	Virginia Cavaliers	52	(1)

Senior career*
Years	Team	Apps	(Gls)
2017–2018	AC Connecticut	18	(0)
2020–2024	New England Revolution	98	(4)
2024–2025	St. Louis City SC	25	(1)
2025	St. Louis City 2	1	(0)
2026–	Charlotte FC	18	(2)

International career^{‡}
2021	United States U23	3	(0)
2021	United States	2	(0)
Medal record
Representing United States
Men's soccer
CONCACAF Gold Cup
Winner	2021
- * Club domestic league appearances and goals as of November 15, 2026 ‡ National team caps and goals as of December 18, 2021

Frederick Henry Kessler (born June 25, 1998) is an American professional soccer player who plays as a center-back for Major League Soccer club Charlotte FC.

== Club career ==
Born in New York City, New York, Kessler began playing soccer in the New York Red Bulls academy, where he played for five years before moving to Beachside Soccer Club in Norwalk, Connecticut.

Prior to college, Kessler considered entering Harvard University but elected to join the University of Virginia after being recruited to play for the Virginia Cavaliers. While in college, Kessler also played two seasons with USL Premier Development League side AC Connecticut.

=== New England Revolution ===
On December 30, 2019, Kessler signed a Generation Adidas contract with Major League Soccer and entered the 2020 MLS SuperDraft. On January 9, 2020, Kessler was selected 6th overall in the draft by the New England Revolution.

Kessler made his professional debut for the Revolution on February 29, 2020, in their opening match against the Montreal Impact. He scored his first career professional goal, also against the Montreal Impact, on September 23, 2020.

On October 11, 2023, Kessler signed a 2-year contract extension with the New England Revolution.

=== St. Louis City SC ===
On August 3, 2024, Kessler was traded to St. Louis City SC, in exchange for Tim Parker plus $600,000 in General Allocation Money. Kessler scored his first goal for St. Louis on September 7, against his former club, New England.

== International career ==
Kessler was named to the final 20-player United States U23 roster for the 2020 CONCACAF Men's Olympic Qualifying Championship in March 2021. He was previously eligible for the Republic of Ireland national team with his mother being an Irish citizen.

Kessler was added to the United States national team for the quarterfinal round of the 2021 Gold Cup, pending CONCACAF approval, replacing an injured Walker Zimmerman. Kessler was cap-tied to the United States by making his senior debut as an extra-time substitute to close out their 2021 CONCACAF Gold Cup Final victory over Mexico.

== Career statistics ==
=== Club ===
As of October 20, 2024

Appearances and goals by club, season and competition
Club	Season	League			Playoffs		National cup		Continental		Other		Total	
Club	Season	Division	Apps	Goals	Apps	Goals	Apps	Goals	Apps	Goals	Apps	Goals	Apps	Goals
AC Connecticut	2017	PDL	9	0	—		—		—		—		9	0
AC Connecticut	2018	PDL	9	0	—		—		—		—		9	0
AC Connecticut	Total		18	0	—		—		—		—		18	0
New England Revolution	2020	MLS	22	1	4	0	—		—		—		26	1
New England Revolution	2021	MLS	28	1	1	0	—		—		—		29	1
New England Revolution	2022	MLS	22	1	—		1	0	—		—		23	1
New England Revolution	2023	MLS	9	1	1	0	—		—		—		10	1
New England Revolution	2024	MLS	17	0	—		—		4 (Note: Appearances in CONCACAF Champions Cup)	0	1 (Note: Appearance in Leagues Cup)	0	22	0
New England Revolution	Total		98	4	6	0	1	0	4	0	1	0	110	4
St. Louis City SC	2024	MLS	8	1	—		—		—		—		8	1
St. Louis City SC	2025	MLS	0	0	0	0	—		—		—		0	0
St. Louis City SC	Total		8	1	0	0	0	0	0	0	0	0	8	1
Career total			124	5	6	0	1	0	4	0	1	0	136	5

=== International ===
As of match played December 18, 2021

Appearances and goals by national team and year
National team	Year	Apps	Goals
United States	2021	2	0
Total		2	0

== Honors ==
New England Revolution

- Supporters' Shield: 2021

United States

- CONCACAF Gold Cup: 2021
