= Oskar Bloch =

Danish footballer (born 2000)

Personal information
- Full name: Oskar Reinhold Bloch
- Date of birth: 20 October 2000 (age 26)
- Place of birth: Roskilde, Denmark
- Height: 1.87 m (6 ft 2 in)
- Position: Defender

Youth career
- 2006–2013: Fløng-Hedehusene
- 2013–2015: FC Roskilde
- 2015–2019: FC Midtjylland

Senior career*
Years	Team	Apps	(Gls)
2019	Slagelse B&I	13	(0)
2020	AB	0	(0)
2020	New England Revolution II	1	(0)
- * Club domestic league appearances and goals as of 10 October 2020

Oskar Reinhold Bloch (born 20 October 2000) is a Danish footballer who plays as a defender.

== Career ==
=== Youth ===
Bloch played with youth teams at Fløng-Hedehusene for 7 years and FC Roskilde for a further 2 years, before moving to FC Midtjylland in 2015, where he was part of back-to-back U19 club championship teams, as well as part of the team who made it to the quarterfinals of the 2018-19 UEFA Youth League. Following his release from Midtjylland in 2019, Bloch opted to move to the United States to play college soccer at the University of Cincinnati.

=== Professional ===
==== Slegelse B&I ====
Bloch opted to forgo moving to the United States, and instead joined Danish 2nd Division side Slagelse B&I on 12 August 2019. He made 13 league appearances and 2 cup appearances for the club.

==== AB ====
After a season with Slagelse, Bloch signed with AB on 3 February 2020.

==== New England Revolution II ====
However, just a month after signing with AB, Bloch moved to the United States with USL League One side New England Revolution II. He made his debut on 7 August 2020, appearing as a 78th-minute substitute during a 2–0 loss to Orlando City B. He left New England in August 2020.
