= Jon Bell =

Jamaican footballer (born 1997)

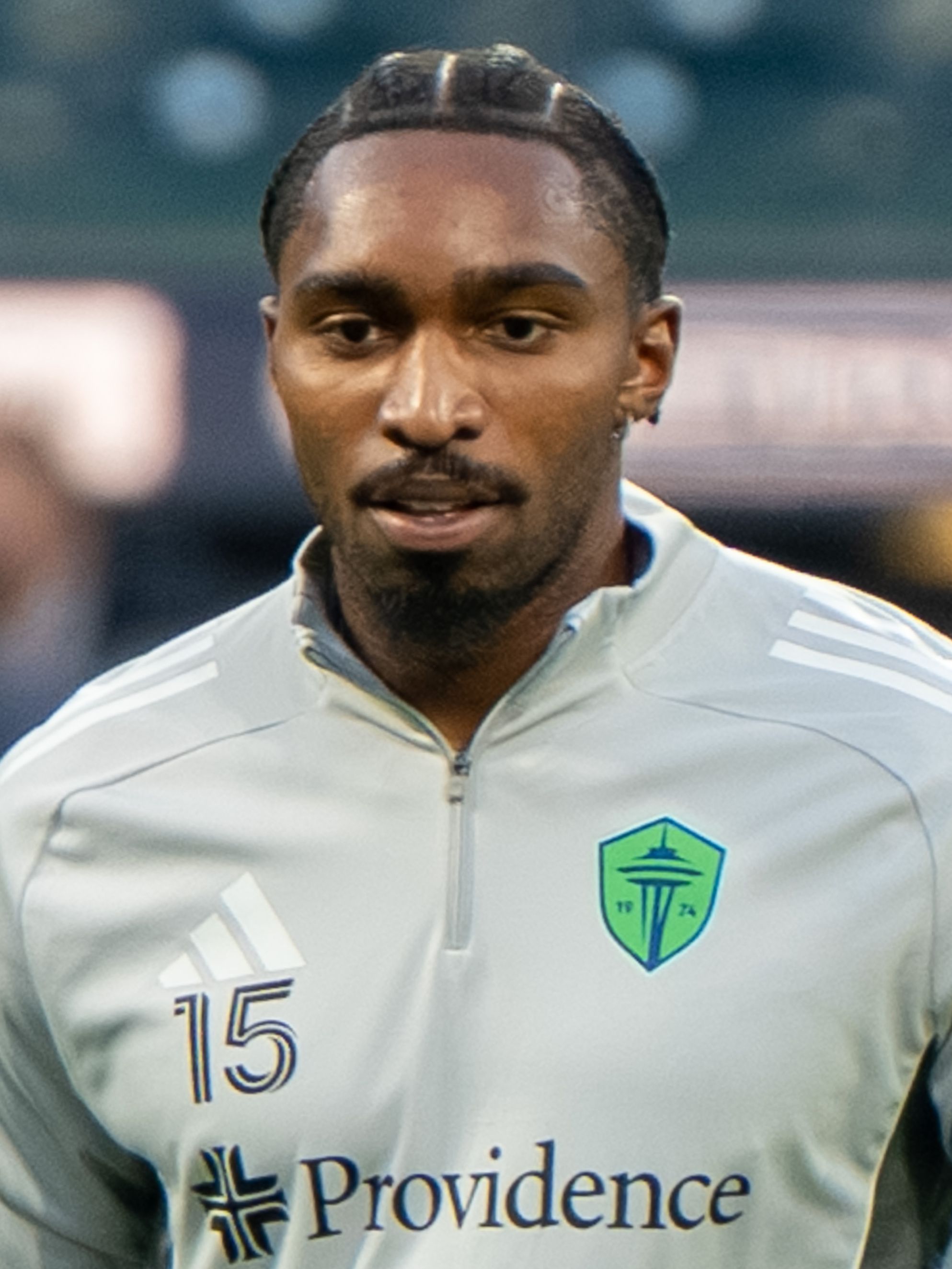
- Bell with the Seattle Sounders in 2025

Personal information
- Full name: Jonathan Bell
- Date of birth: 26 August 1997 (age 29)
- Place of birth: Rockville, Maryland, U.S.
- Height: 5 ft 11 in (1.80 m)
- Position: Defender

Team information
- Current team: Austin FC
- Number: 15

Youth career
- 2011–2016: D.C. United

College career
Years	Team	Apps	(Gls)
2016–2019	UMBC Retrievers	56	(1)

Senior career*
Years	Team	Apps	(Gls)
2017	OKC Energy U23	8	(0)
2019	FC Baltimore Christos	5	(1)
2020–2021	New England Revolution II	18	(0)
2021–2022	New England Revolution	27	(2)
2023	St. Louis City SC	3	(0)
2023	→ St. Louis City 2 (loan)	4	(0)
2024–2025	Seattle Sounders FC	32	(1)
2024–2025	Tacoma Defiance	3	(0)
2026–	Austin FC	23	(2)

International career^{‡}
2023–	Jamaica	2	(0)
- * Club domestic league appearances and goals as of 23:37, 18 October 2026 (UTC) ‡ National team caps and goals as of 23:37, 30 June 2024 (UTC)

Jonathan Bell (born 26 August 1997) is a professional footballer who plays as a defender for Major League Soccer club Austin FC. Born in the United States, he represents the Jamaica national team.

== Club career ==
=== New England Revolution II ===
Bell was selected with the 38th overall pick of the 2020 MLS SuperDraft by the San Jose Earthquakes. In July 2020, he was signed by USL League One club New England Revolution II. He made his debut for the club on 25 July 2020, against Union Omaha.

=== New England Revolution ===
On 22 March 2021, Bell signed a first-team contract with New England Revolution.

=== St. Louis City SC ===
On 11 November 2022, he was selected by St. Louis City SC during 2022 MLS Expansion Draft.

=== Seattle Sounders FC ===
Bell was selected by Seattle Sounders FC in the 2023 MLS Re-Entry Draft.

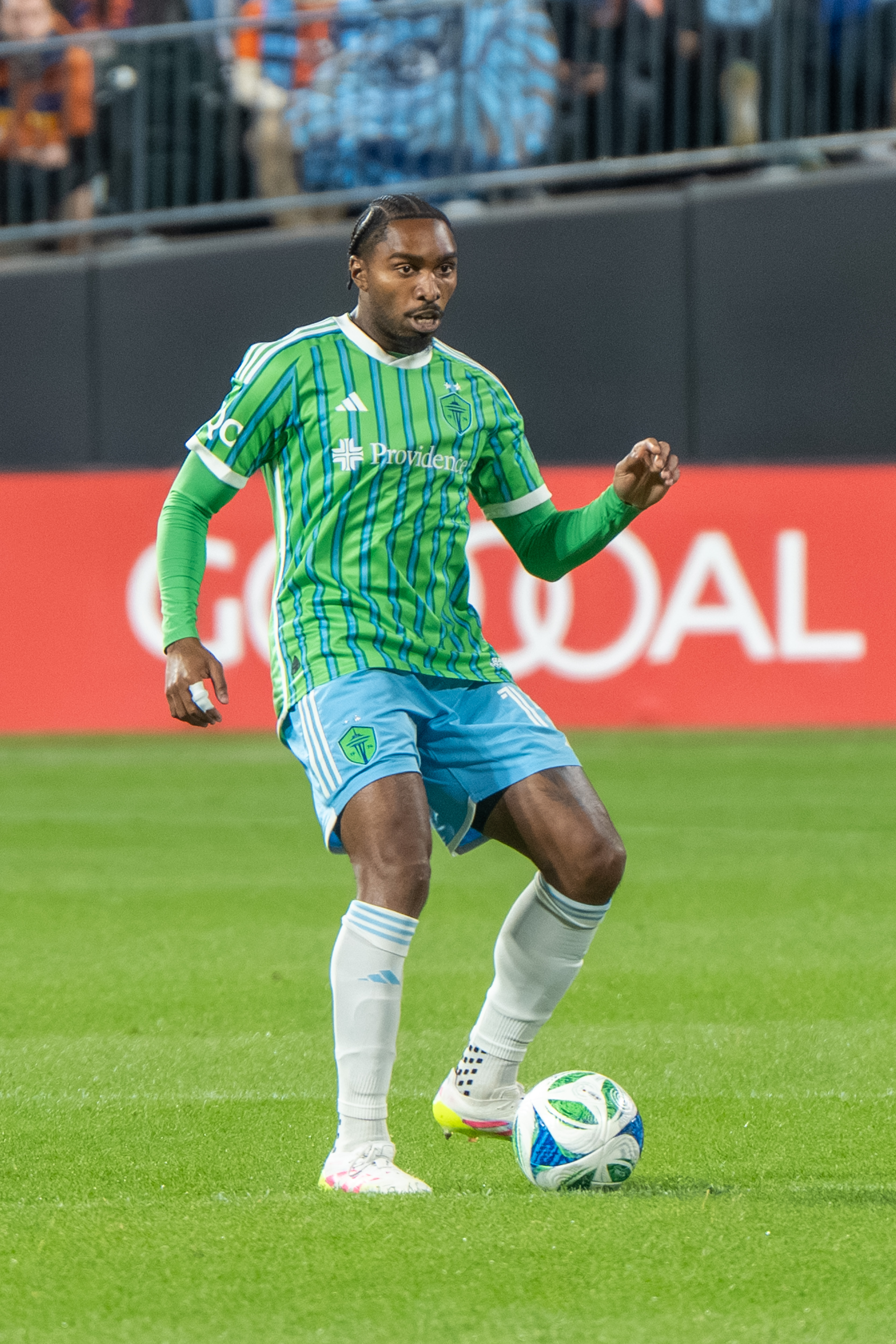
Bell in the 2025 season against Nycfc

=== Austin FC ===
On December 16, 2025, Austin FC signed Bell as a free agent through June 2028, with an option for the 2028–29 season.

== International career ==
Made his international debut for Jamaica in a friendly versus Guatemala on 11 November 2023.

== Career statistics ==
As of match played 17 October 2025

Club	Season	League			Playoffs		U.S. Open Cup		CCC		Others		Total	
Club	Season	Division	Apps	Goals	Apps	Goals	Apps	Goals	Apps	Goals	Apps	Goals	Apps	Goals
OKC Energy U23	2017	USL PDL	8	0	0	0	–		–		–		8	0
FC Baltimore Christos	2019	NPSL	5	1	3	1	–		–		–		8	2
New England Revolution II	2020	USL1	15	0	–		–		–		–		15	0
New England Revolution II	2021	USL1	3	0	–		–		–		–		3	0
New England Revolution II	Total		18	0	0	0	0	0	0	0	0	0	18	0
New England Revolution	2021	MLS	12	1	0	0	–		–		–		12	1
New England Revolution	2022	MLS	15	1	–		1	0	1	0	–		17	1
New England Revolution	Total		27	2	0	0	1	0	1	0	0	0	29	2
St. Louis City SC	2023	MLS	3	0	0	0	1	0	–		1 (Note: Appearance(s) in Leagues Cup)	0	5	0
St. Louis City 2	2023	MLS Next Pro	4	0	0	0	–		–		–		4	0
Tacoma Defiance	2024	MLS Next Pro	3	0	0	0	–		–		–		3	0
Seattle Sounders FC	2024	MLS	11	1	0	0	3	0	–		3	0	17	1
Seattle Sounders FC	2025	MLS	21	0	0	0	–		1	0	3 (Note: Appearance(s) in FIFA Club World Cup)	0	25	0
Seattle Sounders FC	Total		32	1	0	0	3	0	1	0	6	0	42	1
Austin FC	2026	MLS	23	2	0	0	1	0	–		0	0	24	2
Career total			123	6	3	1	6	0	2	0	7	0	141	7

=== International ===
As of match played 30 June 2024

Appearances and goals by national team and year
National Team	Year	Apps	Goals
Jamaica	2023	1	0
Jamaica	2024	1	0
Total		2	0

== Honours ==
New England Revolution

- Supporters' Shield: 2021

St. Louis City SC

- Western Conference (regular season): 2023
