= DeJuan Jones =

American soccer player (born 1997)

Personal information
- Full name: DeJuan Lytelle Jones
- Date of birth: June 24, 1997 (age 29)
- Place of birth: Lansing, Michigan, United States
- Height: 5 ft 11 in (1.81 m)
- Position: Defender

Team information
- Current team: San Jose Earthquakes
- Number: 24

Youth career
- 2011–2014: East Lansing High School

College career
Years	Team	Apps	(Gls)
2015–2018	Michigan State Spartans	76	(16)

Senior career*
Years	Team	Apps	(Gls)
2017	Myrtle Beach Mutiny	8	(4)
2018	Lansing United	9	(5)
2019–2024	New England Revolution	142	(6)
2024–2025	Columbus Crew	15	(2)
2025–	San Jose Earthquakes	15	(1)

International career^{‡}
2023–	United States	10	(0)
- * Club domestic league appearances and goals as of October 29, 2025 ‡ National team caps and goals as of January 22, 2025

DeJuan Lytelle Jones (born June 24, 1997) is an American professional soccer player who plays as a defender for Major League Soccer club San Jose Earthquakes and the United States national team.

== Early life ==
Introduced to soccer at the age of five by his teacher, Jones was a three-year letter winner in soccer at East Lansing High School, while also playing club soccer for TNT Dynamite SC, as well as Force FC. During his junior and senior seasons he led the Trojans to a combined 50–4 record en route to winning back-to-back State Championships. Throughout the seven game playoff run his senior season, Jones netted 9 goals and tailed 12 assists which included the game tying assist and game winning overtime goal in the 2014 State Championship against Cranbrook Schools. Jones was named both the Gatorade Player of the Year and Mr. Soccer for the state of Michigan in his senior year while attending East Lansing High School.

== College career ==
Jones played four seasons at Michigan State, where he was twice named to the All-Big Ten second team. During his first two years, he was seldom named to the starting lineup, although made regular substitute appearances. He scored his first college goal at Bowling Green on September 29, 2015. During his junior season, he started the year as a substitute before becoming a starter in his 6th game of the year, where he would not relinquish the spot in the starting lineup for the remaining 15 games of the year. He finished the season with 7 goals and 6 assists. For his senior season, Jones started all 23 of their games in 2018, and captained the Spartans team that reached the semifinals of the 2018 College Cup, tallying 5 goals and 5 assists for the season. Ahead of the 2019 MLS SuperDraft, Jones performed well at the MLS Combine, placing first in the combine's speed and agility tests, and third in the vertical jump. After scoring a goal in a scrimmage that day, his draft stock rose from being picked late in the first round, to as high as sixth overall on multiple mock drafts.

== Professional career ==
=== New England Revolution ===
A "speedy right winger with attacking sensibilities", Jones was selected with the 11th overall pick of the 2019 MLS SuperDraft by the New England Revolution, the club's second selection of the draft, after Tajon Buchanan. After playing a full preseason with the Revolution where the club tried him out at left-back, Jones signed a contract with the club on February 25, five days ahead of their season opening fixture. Named in the match-day squad for the first two games, Jones did not make his debut until the Revolution's fourth game, at home to expansion side FC Cincinnati on March 24. Jones replaced left-back Edgar Castillo towards the end of the match as the Revolution tried to overcome a two-goal deficit, the game finishing 2–0. On March 30, 2019, Jones made his first career start for the Revolution, recording two shots, including one shot on goal and the game-winning assist in a 2–1 victory over Minnesota. Jones would score his first professional goal against Sporting Kansas City on April 27, with Jones calling it "an awesome feeling." During the second half of the season, Jones transitioned to playing from a winger to become a left-back full-time. After his rookie season in New England, Jones signed a contract extension with the Revolution.

On December 15, 2021, it was announced that Jones signed a contract extension with the Revolution through 2024, with an additional year option.

On January 18, 2024, Jones re-signed with the Revolution on a 4-year deal, which would last through the 2027 MLS Season.

=== Columbus Crew ===
On July 31, 2024, Jones was traded to the Columbus Crew, in exchange for Will Sands plus $600,000 in General Allocation Money. He scored his first goal for the club just 20 seconds after being substituted in during his debut, in a Leagues Cup match against Sporting Kansas City.

=== San Jose Earthquakes ===
On April 22, 2025, Jones was traded to the San Jose Earthquakes, in exchange for $425,000 in General Allocation Money, and one International Roster Slot.

== International career ==
Jones made his debut for the U.S. Men's National Team against Serbia, subbing on in a January camp international friendly on January 25. He made his first start against Colombia later during that same friendly camp. Jones was named to both the preliminary and final roster for the 2023 CONCACAF Gold Cup. Jones then started twice in group stage matches, which included notching his first ever assist at the international level against Trinidad and Tobago, assisting Jesus Ferreira on the opener. Jones then assisted Brandon Vazquez for the opening goal of the quarter-final match up versus Canada, a game the US would go on to win in penalties.

== Style of play ==
An attacking fullback who is adept with either foot, Jones has been lauded for his speed, work-rate, and off-ball runs.

== Personal life ==
DeJuan Lytelle Jones was born on June 24, 1997, at Sparrow Hospital in Lansing, Michigan. Jones attended Dwight Rich School of the Arts, located in Lansing, Michigan, from kindergarten through sixth grade. After finishing sixth grade, he transferred to MacDonald Middle School located in East Lansing and was there for seventh and eighth grade and moved on the East Lansing High School which is where he graduated after completing ninth through twelfth grade. After graduating from East Lansing High School he accepted a scholarship to attend Michigan State University to continue his academic and athletic career.

== Career statistics ==
=== Club ===
As of match played December 1, 2024

Appearances and goals by club, season and competition
Club	Season	League			National cup		Continental		Other (Note: Includes MLS Cup playoffs, Leagues Cup)		Total	
Club	Season	Division	Apps	Goals	Apps	Goals	Apps	Goals	Apps	Goals	Apps	Goals
Myrtle Beach Mutiny	2017	PDL	8	4	—		—		—		8	4
Lansing United	2018	PDL	9	5	—		—		—		9	5
New England Revolution	2019	MLS	20	1	1	0	—		1	0	22	1
New England Revolution	2020	MLS	18	0	—		—		4	0	22	0
New England Revolution	2021	MLS	31	3	—		—		1	0	32	3
New England Revolution	2022	MLS	31	1	2	0	2 (Note: Appearance(s) in CONCACAF Champions Cup)	0	—		35	1
New England Revolution	2023	MLS	25	1	—		—		6	0	31	1
New England Revolution	2024	MLS	17	0	—		5	0	—		22	0
New England Revolution	Total		142	6	3	0	7	0	12	0	164	6
Columbus Crew	2024	MLS	10	2	—		—		7	1	17	3
Columbus Crew	2025	MLS	0	0	—		0	0	—		0	0
Columbus Crew	Total		10	2	0	0	0	0	7	1	17	3
Career total			169	17	3	0	7	0	19	1	198	18

=== International ===
As of match played January 22, 2025

Appearances and goals by national team and year
National team	Year	Apps	Goals
United States	2023	7	0
United States	2024	1	0
United States	2025	2	0
Total		10	0

== Honors ==
Columbus Crew

- Leagues Cup: 2024
