= Matt Polster =

American soccer player (born 1993)

- Polster with the New England Revolution in 2025

Personal information
- Full name: Matthew Ryan Polster
- Date of birth: June 8, 1993 (age 33)
- Place of birth: Milwaukee, Wisconsin, United States
- Height: 6 ft 0 in (1.83 m)
- Positions: Defensive midfielder; right-back

Team information
- Current team: New England Revolution
- Number: 8

Youth career
- 2004–2010: Downtown Las Vegas SC
- 2010–2011: Colorado Rapids

College career
Years	Team	Apps	(Gls)
2011–2014	SIU Edwardsville Cougars	79	(6)

Senior career*
Years	Team	Apps	(Gls)
2013	Victoria Highlanders	4	(0)
2014	Chicago Fire U-23	3	(0)
2015–2018	Chicago Fire	82	(3)
2019–2020	Rangers	7	(0)
2020–	New England Revolution	155	(7)

International career^{‡}
2015–2016	United States U23	11	(0)
2018	United States	1	(0)
- * Club domestic league appearances and goals as of July 27, 2025 ‡ National team caps and goals as of January 28, 2018

Matthew Ryan Polster (born June 8, 1993) is an American professional soccer player who plays as a defensive midfielder for Major League Soccer club New England Revolution.

== Club career ==
=== Early career ===
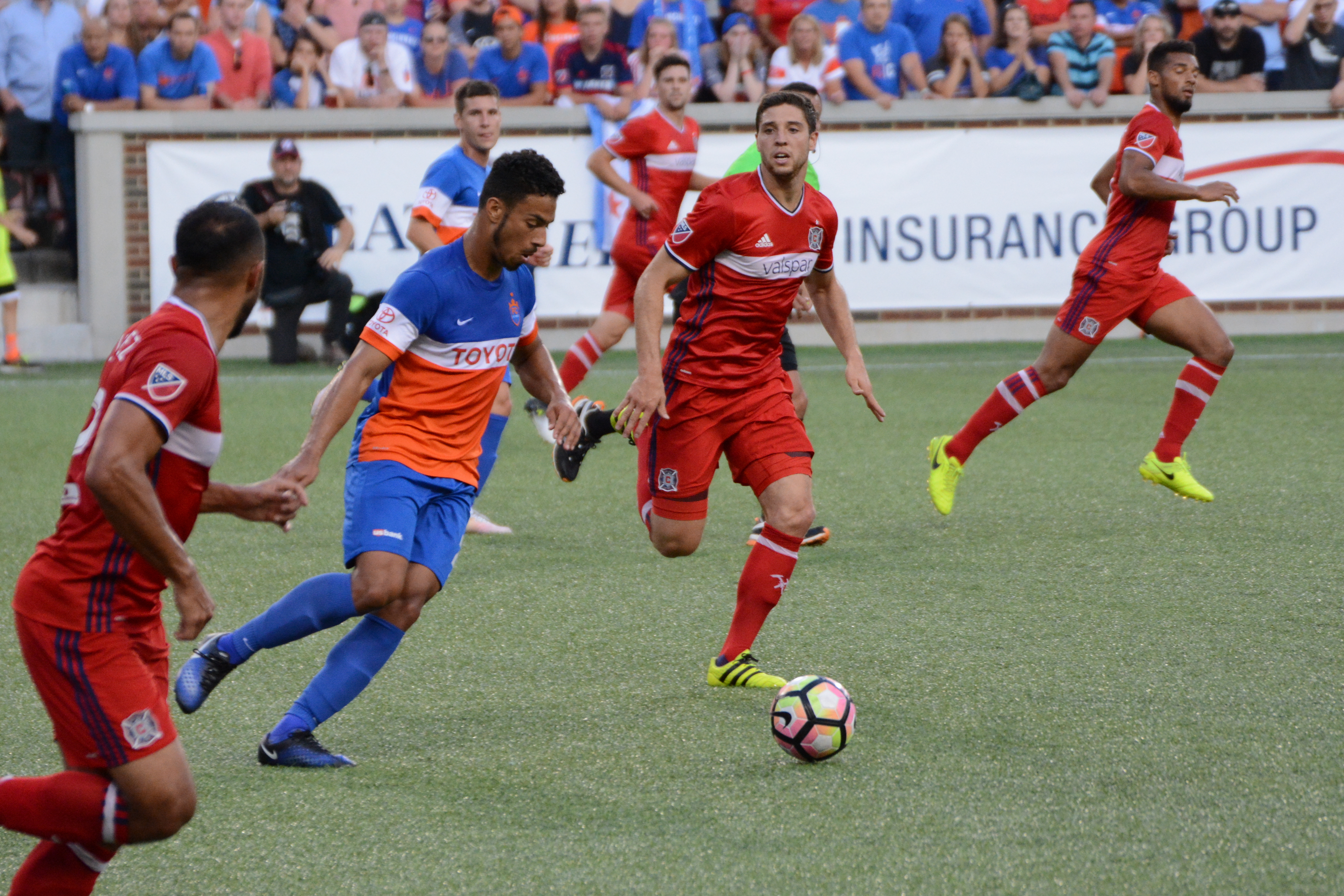
Polster against FC Cincinnati during a 2017 U.S. Open Cup match

Born in Milwaukee, Wisconsin, but raised in Las Vegas, Nevada, Polster played his youth soccer at Downtown Las Vegas Soccer Club. He attended Southern Illinois University Edwardsville where he played for the SIU Edwardsville Cougars. While with the university, Polster earned many honors including 2014 NSCAA All-West Region First Team selection and 2014 NSCAA Scholar All-America First Team selection.

=== Chicago Fire ===
On January 15, 2015, Polster was selected as the 7th overall pick by the Chicago Fire during the 2015 MLS SuperDraft and was signed to a contract on February 4. During his rookie season for the Fire, Polster has played an important role as a holding midfielder, drawing praise from league commentators for his precise passing and defensive capabilities, he earned recognition as Soccer by Ives 'Rookie of the Week' on three occasions during the 2015 season. On July 31, 2016, Polster scored his first career MLS goal in a 2–2 draw against the New York Red Bulls. The goal would later be voted as the Chicago Fire goal of the season in at the end of the year. Polster missed the majority of the 2018 Major League Soccer season due to an MCL injury, causing him to only appear in three matches.

=== Rangers ===
In December 2018, Polster had a trial with Scottish Premiership team Rangers. On January 30, 2019, Polster signed a 2 1/2-year contract with Scottish Premiership club Rangers. Polster made his first appearance in a continental tournament against Gibraltarian club, St Joseph's F.C. in the 2019–20 UEFA Europa League qualifying round.

=== New England Revolution ===
On July 8, 2020, Polster returned to the United States and signed with the New England Revolution. In order to sign Polster, the Revolution had to trade $100,000 in General Allocation Money to his former club Chicago Fire for his rights. On October 21, 2023, Polster recorded his 100th start for the Revolution across all competitions. He made his 200th Revolution start on August 30th 2026, recording a goal in a 3-1 victory over the Columbus Crew.

== International career ==
In January 2016, Polster received his first call up to the senior United States squad for friendlies against Iceland and Canada. Polster did not appear in any of the two matches. Two years later, he was called into January camp again for a friendly against Bosnia and Herzegovina, making his debut in the 0–0 draw.

== Career statistics ==
As of November 17, 2021

Appearances and goals by club, season and competition
Club	Season	League			National cup		Playoffs		League cup		Continental		Total	
Club	Season	Division	Apps	Goals	Apps	Goals	Apps	Goals	Apps	Goals	Apps	Goals	Apps	Goals
Chicago Fire	2015	MLS	30	0	4	0	0	0	—		—		34	0
Chicago Fire	2016	MLS	27	2	3	0	0	0	—		—		30	2
Chicago Fire	2017	MLS	22	1	2	0	1 (Note: Appearance(s) in MLS Cup Playoffs)	0	—		—		25	1
Chicago Fire	2018	MLS	3	0	0	0	0	0	—		—		3	0
Chicago Fire	Total		82	3	9	0	1	0	0	0	0	0	92	3
Rangers	2018–19	Scottish Premiership	1	0	0	0	—		0	0	0	0	1	0
Rangers	2019–20	Scottish Premiership	6	0	0	0	—		1	0	2 (Note: Appearances in UEFA Europa League)	0	9	0
Rangers	Total		7	0	0	0	0	0	1	0	2	0	10	0
New England Revolution	2020	MLS	15	0	0	0	4	0	—		—		19	0
New England Revolution	2021	MLS	30	2	0	0	0	0	—		—		30	2
New England Revolution	Total		45	2	0	0	4	0	0	0	0	0	49	2
Career total			134	5	9	0	5	0	1	0	2	0	151	5
