= 2025 CONCACAF U-17 World Cup qualification =

19th CONCACAF qualification for the FIFA U-17 World Cup

2025 Concacaf U-17 Men's Qualifiers
Tournament details
- Host countries: Bermuda; Costa Rica; Guatemala; Honduras; Mexico; Panama
- Dates: 7–16 February 2025
- Teams: 35 (from 1 confederation)
- Venues: 6 (in 6 host cities)

Tournament statistics
- Matches played: 60
- Goals scored: 308 (5.13 per match)
- Top scorer(s): (United States) Chase Adams (11 goals)

2025 CONCACAF U-17 World Cup qualification, officially called the 2025 Concacaf U-17 Men's Qualifiers, decided which teams from CONCACAF would join host Qatar at the 2025 FIFA U-17 World Cup. Eight qualifying slots were allocated to CONCACAF.

== Teams ==
The 41 CONCACAF national teams were ranked based on the CONCACAF Men’s Under-17 Ranking as of December 2023. 35 teams entered the tournament.

December 2023 rankings

Participating (35 teams)
Rank	Team	Points
1	Mexico	7,288
2	United States	5,962
3	Canada	3,682
4	Honduras	3,444
5	Panama	3,410
6	Costa Rica	3,252
7	Haiti	2,537
8	Jamaica	1,931
9	El Salvador	1,846
10	Cuba	1,510
11	Guatemala	1,410
12	Puerto Rico	1,326
13	Trinidad and Tobago	1,326
14	Nicaragua	1,212
15	Dominican Republic	1,121
17	Bermuda	1,090
18	Curaçao	931
19	Bonaire	863
20	Aruba	850
21	Guyana	839
24	Barbados	710
26	Cayman Islands	637
27	Antigua and Barbuda	628
28	Saint Kitts and Nevis	613
29	Belize	437
30	Saint Lucia	397
31	Grenada	388
32	British Virgin Islands	356
33	Saint Vincent and the Grenadines	323
34	Anguilla	318
35	Saint Martin	292
36	U.S. Virgin Islands	227
37	Dominica	213
38	Turks and Caicos Islands	87
41	Sint Maarten	0

Did not enter (6 teams)
Rank	Team	Points
16	Guadeloupe	1,090
22	Suriname	832
23	Martinique	729
25	Bahamas	649
39	French Guiana	0
40	Montserrat	0

== Venues ==
Six hosts were selected for the eight groups. Each venue hosted its own country's group, with Costa Rica also hosting Group F and Guatemala also hosting Group H.

2025 CONCACAF U-17 World Cup qualification is located in North America	(Bermuda) Devonshire Parish	(Costa Rica) Alajuela	(Mexico) Toluca
2025 CONCACAF U-17 World Cup qualification is located in North America	Group A	Group B & Group F	Group C
2025 CONCACAF U-17 World Cup qualification is located in North America	Bermuda National Sports Centre	Estadio Alejandro Morera Soto	FMF Headquarters
2025 CONCACAF U-17 World Cup qualification is located in North America	Capacity: 8,500	Capacity: 18,895	Capacity: ?
2025 CONCACAF U-17 World Cup qualification is located in Central America	(Honduras) San Pedro Sula	Guatemala City	Panama City
2025 CONCACAF U-17 World Cup qualification is located in Central America	Group D	Group E & Group H	Group G
2025 CONCACAF U-17 World Cup qualification is located in Central America	Estadio General Francisco Morazán	Estadio Cementos Progreso	Estadio Rommel Fernández
2025 CONCACAF U-17 World Cup qualification is located in Central America	Capacity: 18,000	Capacity: 17,000	Capacity: 32,000

== Draw ==
The final draw took place on 24 October 2024, 11:00 ET, at the CONCACAF headquarters in Miami. The teams were drawn into three groups of five and five groups of four.

Pot 1	Pot 2	Pot 3	Pot 4	Pot 5
1. Mexico; 2. United States; 3. Canada; 4. Honduras; 5. Panama; 6. Costa Rica; 7. Haiti; 8. Jamaica	9. El Salvador; 10. Cuba; 11. Guatemala; 12. Puerto Rico; 13. Trinidad and Tobago; 14. Nicaragua; 15. Dominican Republic; 16. Bermuda	17. Curaçao; 18. Bonaire; 19. Aruba; 20. Guyana; 21. Barbados; 22. Cayman Islands; 23. Antigua and Barbuda; 24. Saint Kitts and Nevis	25. Belize; 26. Saint Lucia; 27. Grenada; 28. British Virgin Islands; 29. Saint Vincent and the Grenadines; 30. Anguilla; 31. Saint Martin; 32. U.S. Virgin Islands	33. Dominica; 34. Turks and Caicos Islands; 35. Sint Maarten

== Groups ==
The tournament was played from 7–16 February 2025, with rest days on 8 and 14 February. The teams played a round-robin and the winner of each group qualified for the 2025 FIFA U-17 World Cup.

Tiebreakers

The tiebreaker criteria were as follows (Regulations Article 12.3):

1. Greatest number of points obtained in all group matches (3 for a win, 1 for a draw, 0 for a loss)
2. Greatest goal differential in all group matches
3. Most goals scored in all group matches

Should two or more teams still have equal rank after criteria 1–3 are applied, then the following criteria are used:

4. Greatest number of points obtained in all matches amongst the concerned teams
5. Greatest goal differential in all matches amongst the concerned teams
6. Most goals scored in all matches amongst the concerned teams
7. The best team conduct score using the following table:
  1. First yellow card: –1 point
  2. Second yellow card/indirect red card: –3 points
  3. Direct red card: –4 points
  4. Yellow card and direct red card: –5 points
8. Latest Concacaf U-17 Ranking.

All match times listed are EST (UTC−5), as listed by Concacaf. Local times, if different, are in parentheses.

=== Group A ===
Pos	Team	Pld	W	D	L	GF	GA	GD	Pts	Qualification
1	Canada	4	4	0	0	28	2	+26	12	2025 FIFA U-17 World Cup
2	Curaçao	4	3	0	1	13	10	+3	9	
3	Bermuda (H)	4	2	0	2	10	14	−4	6	
4	Turks and Caicos Islands	4	1	0	3	3	13	−10	3	
5	Anguilla	4	0	0	4	3	18	−15	0	

Source: CONCACAF
Rules for classification: Tiebreakers
(H) Hosts
7 February 2025
14:00 (15:00 UTC−4)

Anguilla	0–3	Turks and Caicos Islands
	Report	Saintilus 2'; Selver 24', 36'

Bermuda National Sports Centre, Devonshire
Referee: Ken Pennyfeather (Antigua and Barbuda)
7 February 2025
19:00 (20:00 UTC−4)

Bermuda	1–6	Curaçao
Fray 71' (pen.)	Report	Carolo 8' (o.g.); Anastacia 17'; Busby 46', 62'; Smith-Davis 87' (o.g.); Bregita 90+5'

Bermuda National Sports Centre, Devonshire
Referee: Jonathon Hughes (Cayman Islands)

9 February 2025
14:00 (15:00 UTC−4)

Turks and Caicos Islands	0–6	Canada
	Report	Ali-Gayapersad 10'; Graham-Roache 18'; Jimoh 23'; Khan 45' (pen.); Aiyenero 85'; Kozlovskiy 89'

Bermuda National Sports Centre, Devonshire
Referee: Roger Vindas (Costa Rica)
9 February 2025
19:00 (20:00 UTC−4)

Bermuda	3–1	Anguilla
Fray 23', 53'; Jiménez 45+1'	Report	Brangman 90' (o.g.)

Bermuda National Sports Centre, Devonshire
Referee: James Ramprashad (British Virgin Islands)

11 February 2025
14:00 (15:00 UTC−4)

Curaçao	2–0	Turks and Caicos Islands
Busby 35'; Polonius 79'	Report

Bermuda National Sports Centre, Devonshire
Referee: Sergio Rozenhaut (Suriname)
11 February 2025
19:00 (20:00 UTC−4)

Canada	8–0	Anguilla
Daniels 9'; Evans 36', 39'; Sadek 43'; Aiyenero 65'; Kozlovskiy 68'; Selemani 82'; Khan 90+3'	Report

Bermuda National Sports Centre, Devonshire
Referee: Jonathon Hughes (Cayman Islands)

13 February 2025
14:00 (15:00 UTC−4)

Curaçao	1–7	Canada
Ortela 45+1' (pen.)	Report	Aiyenero 27', 45+3', 47'; Khan 32', 64'; Jimoh 54'; Evans 88'

Bermuda National Sports Centre, Devonshire
Referee: Ken Pennyfeather (Antigua and Barbuda)
13 February 2025
19:00 (20:00 UTC−4)

Turks and Caicos Islands	0–5	Bermuda
	Report	Brunson 6' (pen.), 27', 54'; Jiménez 73'; Bean-Fox 90+1'

Bermuda National Sports Centre, Devonshire
Referee: Roger Vindas (Costa Rica)

16 February 2025
14:00 (15:00 UTC−4)

Anguilla	2–4	Curaçao
Jackson 54'; Owen 67'	Report	Isenia 7'; Busby 10'; Ortela 19'; Anastacia 77'

Bermuda National Sports Centre, Devonshire
Referee: James Ramprashad (British Virgin Islands)
16 February 2025
19:00 (20:00 UTC−4)

Canada	7–1	Bermuda
Evans 41', 60', 64', 67'; Ali-Gayapersad 74'; Khan 83' (pen.); Kozlovskiy 90'	Report	Bean-Fox 33' (pen.)

Bermuda National Sports Centre, Devonshire
Referee: Sergio Rozenhaut (Suriname)

=== Group B ===
Pos	Team	Pld	W	D	L	GF	GA	GD	Pts	Qualification
1	Costa Rica (H)	4	3	1	0	21	2	+19	10	2025 FIFA U-17 World Cup
2	Trinidad and Tobago	4	2	1	1	13	4	+9	7	
3	Guyana	4	1	3	0	7	4	+3	6	
4	British Virgin Islands	4	1	1	2	6	9	−3	4	
5	Sint Maarten	4	0	0	4	0	28	−28	0	

Source: CONCACAF
Rules for classification: Tiebreakers
(H) Hosts
7 February 2025
17:00 (16:00 UTC−6)

British Virgin Islands	4–0	Sint Maarten
Sharma 34'; Williams 62'; Stuttard 69', 72'	Report

Estadio Alejandro Morera Soto, Alajuela
Referee: Félix Mojica (Nicaragua)
7 February 2025
20:00 (19:00 UTC−6)

Trinidad and Tobago	1–1	Guyana
Nelson 54'	Report	Morris 32'

Estadio Alejandro Morera Soto, Alajuela
Referee: Evens Julmis (Bahamas)

9 February 2025
17:00 (16:00 UTC−6)

Trinidad and Tobago	3–1	British Virgin Islands
Kallicharan 6', 27'; Billingy 22' (o.g.)	Report	Abraham 90+2'

Estadio Alejandro Morera Soto, Alajuela
Referee: Christopher Mason (Jamaica)
9 February 2025
20:00 (19:00 UTC−6)

Sint Maarten	0–12	Costa Rica
	Report	Badilla 3', 7', 53'; Sosa 11', 71'; Barley 19'; Brown 39'; S. López 48'; Medina 59'; Farrier 67'; Cordero 79'; Sibaja 85'

Estadio Alejandro Morera Soto, Alajuela
Referee: Jean-Marc Scholtz (Curaçao)

11 February 2025
17:00 (16:00 UTC−6)

Guyana	3–0	Sint Maarten
David 18'; Fraser 56'; Harris 73'	Report

Estadio Alejandro Morera Soto, Alajuela
Referee: Joseph Bedeau (Grenada)
11 February 2025
20:00 (19:00 UTC−6)

Costa Rica	5–0	British Virgin Islands
Badilla 26'; Calderón 43', 66'; Brown 60' (pen.); Bennette 83'	Report

Estadio Alejandro Morera Soto, Alajuela
Referee: Michael Venne (Canada)

13 February 2025
17:00 (16:00 UTC−6)

Sint Maarten	0–9	Trinidad and Tobago
	Report	Kallicharan 36', 48', 73'; McNish 43'; Pierre 85'; Valentine 87'; Gomez 88'; Trestrail 90+1'; Foncette 90+7'

Estadio Alejandro Morera Soto, Alajuela
Referee: Joseph Bedeau (Grenada)
13 February 2025
20:00 (19:00 UTC−6)

Guyana	2–2	Costa Rica
Morris 38'; David 54'	Report	Robinson 1' (o.g.); Brown 43'

Estadio Alejandro Morera Soto, Alajuela
Referee: Christopher Mason (Jamaica)

16 February 2025
17:00 (16:00 UTC−6)

British Virgin Islands	1–1	Guyana
Stuttard 90+1'	Report	Harris 53'

Estadio Alejandro Morera Soto, Alajuela
Referee: Jean-Marc Scholtz (Curaçao)
16 February 2025
20:00 (19:00 UTC−6)

Costa Rica	2–0	Trinidad and Tobago
Badilla 45' (pen.); Barley 87'	Report

Estadio Alejandro Morera Soto, Alajuela
Referee: Michael Venne (Canada)

=== Group C ===
Pos	Team	Pld	W	D	L	GF	GA	GD	Pts	Qualification
1	Mexico (H)	4	3	1	0	19	2	+17	10	2025 FIFA U-17 World Cup
2	Nicaragua	4	3	1	0	13	3	+10	10	
3	Barbados	4	2	0	2	5	15	−10	6	
4	Belize	4	1	0	3	10	8	+2	3	
5	Dominica	4	0	0	4	1	20	−19	0	

Source: CONCACAF
Rules for classification: Tiebreakers
(H) Hosts
7 February 2025
13:00 (12:00 UTC−6)

Belize	7–0	Dominica
Valle 2' (pen.), 24'; Stanford 15', 59'; Meza 36', 46'; Olivas 79'	Report

FMF Headquarters, Toluca
Referee: Cristian Alvarado (Guatemala)
7 February 2025
16:00 (15:00 UTC−6)

Nicaragua	6–0	Barbados
Uriarte 32', 40', 53' (pen.), 90'; Aviles 34'; Zepeda 70'	Report

FMF Headquarters, Toluca
Referee: Pablo Camacho (Costa Rica)

9 February 2025
13:00 (12:00 UTC−6)

Nicaragua	1–0	Belize
Uriarte 76' (pen.)	Report

FMF Headquarters, Toluca
Referee: Okeito Nicholson (Jamaica)
9 February 2025
16:00 (15:00 UTC−6)

Dominica	0–8	Mexico
	Report	García 18'; Grajales 36'; de Nigris 45+1', 75'; Gamboa 45+4'; Mancilla 74'; Núñez 80' (pen.); Rangel 83'

FMF Headquarters, Toluca
Referee: Adrián Lage (Cuba)

11 February 2025
13:00 (12:00 UTC−6)

Barbados	1–0	Dominica
Rodney 82' (o.g.)	Report

FMF Headquarters, Toluca
Referee: Caterin Cartagena (Guatemala)
11 February 2025
16:00 (15:00 UTC−6)

Mexico	3–0	Belize
Gamboa 37' (pen.); Reyes 49'; Sánchez 72'	Report

FMF Headquarters, Toluca
Referee: Pablo Camacho (Costa Rica)

13 February 2025
13:00 (12:00 UTC−6)

Dominica	1–4	Nicaragua
Gasper 60'	Report	Uriarte 40' (pen.); Padilla 47'; Parrales 54'; Gutiérrez 66'

FMF Headquarters, Toluca
Referee: Caterin Cartagena (Guatemala)
13 February 2025
16:00 (15:00 UTC−6)

Barbados	0–6	Mexico
	Report	Ortiz 34' (pen.); Tejeda 39'; Rangel 52'; de Nigris 69', 82'; Reyes 72'

FMF Headquarters, Toluca
Referee: Álvaro Alvarado (Guatemala)

16 February 2025
13:00 (12:00 UTC−6)

Belize	3–4	Barbados
Meza 36', 90+1'; Herrera 58'	Report	Cartagena 55' (o.g.); Barker 62'; Bellamy 64' (pen.), 68'

FMF Headquarters, Toluca
Referee: Adrián Lage (Cuba)
16 February 2025
16:00 (15:00 UTC−6)

Mexico	2–2	Nicaragua
Mancilla 6'; Reyes 56'	Report	Gamez 3'; Gutiérrez 90+3'

FMF Headquarters, Toluca
Referee: Okeito Nicholson (Jamaica)

=== Group D ===
Pos	Team	Pld	W	D	L	GF	GA	GD	Pts	Qualification
1	Honduras (H)	3	3	0	0	12	1	+11	9	2025 FIFA U-17 World Cup
2	Puerto Rico	3	2	0	1	6	1	+5	6	
3	Saint Martin	3	1	0	2	5	7	−2	3	
4	Bonaire	3	0	0	3	1	15	−14	0	

Source: CONCACAF
Rules for classification: Tiebreakers
(H) Hosts
10 February 2025
17:00 (16:00 UTC−6)

Puerto Rico	3–0	Bonaire
Belgodere 11'; Marquez 45+2', 84'	Report

Estadio General Francisco Morazán, San Pedro Sula
Referee: Fernando Morón (Panama)
10 February 2025
20:00 (19:00 UTC−6)

Honduras	3–1	Saint Martin
Arriola 2'; Flores 20'; Reyes 73'	Report	Martín 68' (o.g.)

Estadio General Francisco Morazán, San Pedro Sula
Referee: Sanchez Bass (Saint Kitts and Nevis)

12 February 2025
17:00 (16:00 UTC−6)

Saint Martin	0–3	Puerto Rico
	Report	Marquez 21', 62'; van Putten 85' (o.g.)

Estadio General Francisco Morazán, San Pedro Sula
Referee: Cleon Culley (Guyana)
12 February 2025
20:00 (19:00 UTC−6)

Bonaire	0–8	Honduras
	Report	García 3'; Palacios 11'; Arana 45'; Flores 65'; Suazo 69', 79', 86'; Reyes 75'

Estadio General Francisco Morazán, San Pedro Sula
Referee: Ismael López (Mexico)

15 February 2025
17:00 (16:00 UTC−6)

Bonaire	1–4	Saint Martin
Isenia 71'	Report	Vilar 26'; Charlery-Adele 32', 41', 57'

Estadio General Francisco Morazán, San Pedro Sula
Referee: Sanchez Bass (Saint Kitts and Nevis)
15 February 2025
20:00 (19:00 UTC−6)

Honduras	1–0	Puerto Rico
Arriola 67'	Report

Estadio General Francisco Morazán, San Pedro Sula
Referee: Fernando Morón (Panama)

=== Group E ===
Pos	Team	Pld	W	D	L	GF	GA	GD	Pts	Qualification
1	Haiti	3	3	0	0	10	0	+10	9	2025 FIFA U-17 World Cup
2	Guatemala (H)	3	2	0	1	7	3	+4	6	
3	Antigua and Barbuda	3	1	0	2	4	6	−2	3	
4	Saint Vincent and the Grenadines	3	0	0	3	1	13	−12	0	

Source: CONCACAF
Rules for classification: Tiebreakers
(H) Hosts
11 February 2025
17:00 (16:00 UTC−6)

Haiti	5–0	Saint Vincent and the Grenadines
Laïssé 12'; Pierre 19', 42'; Lacombe 46'; Celestine 78'	Report

Estadio Cementos Progreso, Guatemala City
Referee: Andrew Samuel (Trinidad and Tobago)
11 February 2025
20:00 (19:00 UTC−6)

Guatemala	2–1	Antigua and Barbuda
A. García 24'; Ávila 35'	Report	Meade 69'

Estadio Cementos Progreso, Guatemala City
Referee: Shekiel Jokil (Suriname)

13 February 2025
17:00 (16:00 UTC−6)

Antigua and Barbuda	0–3	Haiti
	Report	Celestine 14' (pen.); Laïssé 34' (pen.), 82' (pen.)

Estadio Cementos Progreso, Guatemala City
Referee: Bryan Cruz (Costa Rica)
13 February 2025
20:00 (19:00 UTC−6)

Saint Vincent and the Grenadines	0–5	Guatemala
	Report	A. García 14'; Ávila 45+1', 66'; Celis 67'; de Oliveira 82'

Estadio Cementos Progreso, Guatemala City
Referee: Shavin Greene (Guyana)

16 February 2025
17:00 (16:00 UTC−6)

Antigua and Barbuda	3–1	Saint Vincent and the Grenadines
Satchell 15'; G. Williams 66', 74'	Report	Cunningham 33'

Estadio Cementos Progreso, Guatemala City
Referee: Jonathan Bonilla (Costa Rica)
16 February 2025
20:00 (19:00 UTC−6)

Haiti	2–0	Guatemala
Jean-Philippe 8'; Joseph 90+4'	Report

Estadio Cementos Progreso, Guatemala City
Referee: Shekiel Jokil (Suriname)

=== Group F ===
Pos	Team	Pld	W	D	L	GF	GA	GD	Pts	Qualification
1	United States	3	3	0	0	31	0	+31	9	2025 FIFA U-17 World Cup
2	Cuba	3	2	0	1	9	6	+3	6	
3	Saint Kitts and Nevis	3	1	0	2	10	12	−2	3	
4	U.S. Virgin Islands	3	0	0	3	5	37	−32	0	

Source: CONCACAF
Rules for classification: Tiebreakers
10 February 2025
17:00 (16:00 UTC−6)

Cuba	3–1	Saint Kitts and Nevis
Díaz 76', 83'; Bravo 90+4'	Report	Mitcham 43'

Estadio Alejandro Morera Soto, Alajuela
Referee: Edson Lieveld (Suriname)
10 February 2025
20:00 (19:00 UTC−6)

United States	22–0	U.S. Virgin Islands
Cowell 2', 40'; Carrizo 5', 15', 28', 67'; Adams 8', 9', 13', 19', 31', 33', 38', 55', 75', 77'; Guimaraes 41'; Terry 43', 52'; Hamouda 51'; Johnson 79'; LeBlanc 86'	Report

Estadio Alejandro Morera Soto, Alajuela
Referee: José Valladares (Honduras)

12 February 2025
17:00 (16:00 UTC−6)

U.S. Virgin Islands	3–6	Cuba
Hernández 46' (o.g.); Bass 90+4'; Penders 90+6'	Report	Pacheco 6'; Romero 45'; Díaz 48', 58'; Terry 90'; Milanes 90+5'

Estadio Alejandro Morera Soto, Alajuela
Referee: Félix Mojica (Nicaragua)
12 February 2025
20:00 (19:00 UTC−6)

Saint Kitts and Nevis	0–7	United States
	Report	Uriostegui 11'; Oliveira 19'; Rosborough 24', 45+11', 69', 84'; Martínez 58'

Estadio Alejandro Morera Soto, Alajuela
Referee: Evens Julmis (Bahamas)

15 February 2025
17:00 (16:00 UTC−6)

Saint Kitts and Nevis	9–2	U.S. Virgin Islands
Mitcham 5', 8'; Samuel-Francis 22', 83', 88', 90+3'; Morton 32', 40', 45'	Report	Bass 21', 87'

Estadio Alejandro Morera Soto, Alajuela
Referee: Edson Lieveld (Suriname)
15 February 2025
20:00 (19:00 UTC−6)

United States	2–0	Cuba
Adams 23'; Carrizo 31'	Report

Estadio Alejandro Morera Soto, Alajuela
Referee: José Valladares (Honduras)

=== Group G ===
Pos	Team	Pld	W	D	L	GF	GA	GD	Pts	Qualification
1	Panama (H)	3	3	0	0	13	1	+12	9	2025 FIFA U-17 World Cup
2	Dominican Republic	3	2	0	1	6	2	+4	6	
3	Aruba	3	1	0	2	2	5	−3	3	
4	Grenada	3	0	0	3	1	14	−13	0	

Source: CONCACAF
Rules for classification: Tiebreakers
(H) Hosts
10 February 2025
16:00

Dominican Republic	1–0	Aruba
Saidani 20'	Report

Estadio Rommel Fernández, Panama City
Referee: Hakeem Harvey (Saint Kitts and Nevis)
10 February 2025
19:00

Panama	8–0	Grenada
Gordón 6'; E. López 16'; Prado 34', 83', 90+2'; Pacheco 44'; Altamirano 45+1' (pen.); Olivardia 80' (pen.)	Report

Estadio Rommel Fernández, Panama City
Referee: Norberto Da Silva (Curaçao)

12 February 2025
16:00

Grenada	0–4	Dominican Republic
	Report	L. López 22' (pen.), 45+2'; Garcia 64'; Urresti 72'

Estadio Rommel Fernández, Panama City
Referee: Timothy Derry (Trinidad and Tobago)
12 February 2025
19:00

Aruba	0–3	Panama
	Report	Gordón 16'; Brias 23'; E. López 35' (pen.)

Estadio Rommel Fernández, Panama City
Referee: Ray Torres (Puerto Rico)

15 February 2025
16:00

Aruba	2–1	Grenada
Wever 83'; Obispo 90+3'	Report	Thomas 86' (pen.)

Estadio Rommel Fernández, Panama City
Referee: Timothy Derry (Trinidad and Tobago)
15 February 2025
19:00

Panama	2–1	Dominican Republic
Prado 29'; E. López 87'	Report	A. López 43'

Estadio Rommel Fernández, Panama City
Referee: Norberto Da Silva (Curaçao)

=== Group H ===
Pos	Team	Pld	W	D	L	GF	GA	GD	Pts	Qualification
1	El Salvador	3	3	0	0	12	1	+11	9	2025 FIFA U-17 World Cup
2	Jamaica	3	2	0	1	14	4	+10	6	
3	Saint Lucia	3	1	0	2	6	5	+1	3	
4	Cayman Islands	3	0	0	3	1	23	−22	0	

Source: CONCACAF
Rules for classification: Tiebreakers
10 February 2025
17:00 (16:00 UTC−6)

Jamaica	3–1	Saint Lucia
Reid 12'; D. White 50'; Nolan 55'	Report	Byron 73'

Estadio Cementos Progreso, Guatemala City
Referee: Jonathan Leitón (Costa Rica)
10 February 2025
20:00 (19:00 UTC−6)

El Salvador	8–0	Cayman Islands
Tobar 3', 13'; Inojosa 17', 34'; Perla 43'; Torres 45'; Galdamez 68'; Ramírez 73'	Report

Estadio Cementos Progreso, Guatemala City
Referee: Khamal Harding-Hodge (Anguilla)

12 February 2025
17:00 (16:00 UTC−6)

Cayman Islands	1–10	Jamaica
Alban 84' (pen.)	Report	Brown 11', 68'; Marsh 25' (pen.); McLean 37'; Reid 40', 44'; Jumpp 48'; Nolan 64', 80'; Miller 73'

Estadio Cementos Progreso, Guatemala City
Referee: José Corporan (Dominican Republic)
12 February 2025
20:00 (19:00 UTC−6)

Saint Lucia	0–2	El Salvador
	Report	Tobar 16'; Torres 52'

Estadio Cementos Progreso, Guatemala City
Referee: Jorge Ojeda (Nicaragua)

15 February 2025
17:00 (16:00 UTC−6)

Cayman Islands	0–5	Saint Lucia
	Report	McLean 24' (o.g.); Morille 27' (pen.); Byron 52'; Henry 60', 76'

Estadio Cementos Progreso, Guatemala City
Referee: Bryan Cruz (Costa Rica)
15 February 2025
20:00 (19:00 UTC−6)

Jamaica	1–2	El Salvador
Campbell-Dennis 48'	Report	Perla 22'; Ramírez 80'

Estadio Cementos Progreso, Guatemala City
Referee: Shavin Greene (Guyana)

== Goalscorers ==
There were 308 goals scored in 60 matches, for an average of 5.13 goals per match.

11 goals

- (United States) Chase Adams

7 goals

- (Canada) Aidan Evans

6 goals

- (Nicaragua) Juban Uriarte

5 goals

- (Canada) Marius Aiyenero
- (Canada) Kevin Khan
- (Costa Rica) Isaac Badilla
- (Trinidad and Tobago) Josiah Kallicharan
- (United States) Máximo Carrizo

4 goals

- (Belize) Marlon Meza Jr.
- (Cuba) Lazaro Díaz
- (Curaçao) Dayvi Busby
- (Mexico) Aldo de Nigris
- (Panama) Mikel Prado
- (Puerto Rico) Eddiel Marquez
- (Saint Kitts and Nevis) Akanye Samuel-Francis
- (United States) Tanner Rosborough

3 goals

- (Bermuda) Kalen Brunson
- (Bermuda) Kennahz Fray
- (British Virgin Islands) Luca Stuttard
- (Canada) Sergei Kozlovskiy
- (Costa Rica) Marcus Brown
- (El Salvador) Luis Tobar
- (Guatemala) Marvin Ávila
- (Haiti) Emerson Laïssé
- (Honduras) Luis Suazo
- (Jamaica) Jahmarie Nolan
- (Jamaica) Seymour Reid
- (Mexico) Máximo Reyes
- (Panama) Estevis López
- (Saint Kitts and Nevis) Franklyn Mitcham
- (Saint Kitts and Nevis) Savi-K Morton
- (Collectivity of Saint Martin) Jahnael Charlery-Adele
- (United States Virgin Islands) Connor Bass

2 goals

- (Antigua and Barbuda) Greg Williams
- (Barbados) Tyrico Bellamy
- (Belize) Jahson Stanford
- (Belize) D. Alessandro Valle
- (Bermuda) Harlem Bean-Fox
- (Bermuda) Logan Jiménez
- (Canada) Andre Ali-Gayapersad
- (Canada) Shola Jimoh
- (Costa Rica) Ethan Barley
- (Costa Rica) Brayan Calderón
- (Costa Rica) Yerlan Sosa
- (Curaçao) D'Shawn Anastacia
- (Curaçao) Jeremy Ortela
- (Dominican Republic) Luis López
- (El Salvador) Rafael Inojosa
- (El Salvador) Jefferson Perla
- (El Salvador) Brandon Ramírez
- (El Salvador) Kerin Torres
- (Guatemala) Andrés García
- (Guyana) Shaquan David
- (Guyana) Jaden Harris
- (Guyana) Joshua Morris
- (Haiti) Franco Celestine
- (Haiti) Nikolai Pierre
- (Honduras) Jason Arriola
- (Honduras) David Flores
- (Honduras) Marcos Reyes
- (Jamaica) Jaquan Brown
- (Mexico) Luis Gamboa
- (Mexico) José Mancilla
- (Mexico) Juan Rangel
- (Nicaragua) Diego Gutiérrez
- (Panama) Gerson Gordón
- (Saint Lucia) Shevon Byron
- (Saint Lucia) Traylan Henry
- (Turks and Caicos Islands) Schuyler Selver
- (United States) Chance Cowell
- (United States) Jude Terry

1 goal

- (Anguilla) Tarique Jackson
- (Anguilla) Nathaniel Owen
- (Antigua and Barbuda) Sakidi Meade
- (Antigua and Barbuda) Brandon Satchell
- (Aruba) Max Obispo
- (Aruba) Travis Wever
- (Barbados) Tariq Barker
- (Belize) Jamal Herrera
- (Belize) Breyden Olivas
- (Bonaire) Darryn Isenia
- (British Virgin Islands) Zeveih Abraham
- (British Virgin Islands) Sam Sharma
- (British Virgin Islands) Latriel Williams
- (Canada) Will Daniels
- (Canada) Owen Graham-Roache
- (Canada) Aghilas Sadek
- (Canada) Johnny Selemani
- (Cayman Islands) Jagger Alban
- (Costa Rica) Nick Bennette
- (Costa Rica) Thiago Cordero
- (Costa Rica) Kaden Farrier
- (Costa Rica) Sebastián López
- (Costa Rica) Luis Medina
- (Costa Rica) Gabriel Sibaja
- (Cuba) Cristian Bravo
- (Cuba) Anthony Milanes
- (Cuba) Iván Pacheco
- (Cuba) Brian Romero
- (Cuba) José Terry
- (Curaçao) Taysison Bregita
- (Curaçao) Nathan Isenia
- (Curaçao) Jaydion Polonius
- (Dominica) Darius Gasper
- (Dominican Republic) Adrián Garcia
- (Dominican Republic) Alejandro López
- (Dominican Republic) Ismahel Saidani
- (Dominican Republic) Álex Urresti
- (El Salvador) Eduardo Galdamez
- (Grenada) Josh Thomas
- (Guatemala) Javier Celis
- (Guatemala) Claudio de Oliveira
- (Guyana) Quaency Fraser
- (Haiti) Djouby Jean-Philippe
- (Haiti) Miguel Joseph
- (Haiti) Theo Lacombe
- (Honduras) Mike Arana
- (Honduras) Deijan García
- (Honduras) Joshua Palacios
- (Jamaica) Raequan Campbell-Dennis
- (Jamaica) Owen Jumpp
- (Jamaica) Zienodean McLean
- (Jamaica) Cadriano Marsh
- (Jamaica) Orel Miller
- (Jamaica) Dario White
- (Mexico) Gael García
- (Mexico) Jhonnatan Grajales
- (Mexico) Daniel Núñez
- (Mexico) Viggo Ortiz
- (Mexico) Jorge Sánchez
- (Mexico) Saulo Tejedo
- (Nicaragua) Yader Aviles
- (Nicaragua) Jocksan Gamez
- (Nicaragua) Leandro Padilla
- (Nicaragua) Ian Parrales
- (Nicaragua) Edwin Zepeda
- (Panama) Abraham Altamirano
- (Panama) Héctor Brias
- (Panama) Adrián Olivardia
- (Panama) Joseph Pacheco
- (Puerto Rico) Matthew Belgodere
- (Saint Lucia) Thierry Morille
- (Collectivity of Saint Martin) Tylian Vilar
- (Saint Vincent and the Grenadines) Zibeon Cunningham
- (Trinidad and Tobago) Nikosi Foncette
- (Trinidad and Tobago) Criston Gomez
- (Trinidad and Tobago) Sheridan McNish
- (Trinidad and Tobago) Philip Nelson
- (Trinidad and Tobago) Adam Pierre
- (Trinidad and Tobago) Caden Trestrail
- (Trinidad and Tobago) Timothy Valentine
- (Turks and Caicos Islands) Wepsdel Saintilus
- (United States) Pedro Guimaraes
- (United States) Ramiz Hamouda
- (United States) Jamir Johnson
- (United States) Kellan LeBlanc
- (United States) Enrique Martínez
- (United States) Cristiano Oliveira
- (United States) Axel Uriostegui
- (United States Virgin Islands) Toryn Penders

1 own goal

- (Belize) Deifson Cartagena (against Barbados)
- (Bermuda) Amir Brangman (against Anguilla)
- (Bermuda) Sami Carolo (against Curaçao)
- (Bermuda) Dakari Smith-Davis (against Curaçao)
- (British Virgin Islands) Qu'yl Billingy (against Trinidad and Tobago)
- (Cayman Islands) Aden McLean (against Saint Lucia)
- (Cuba) Kévin Hernández (against the U.S. Virgin Islands)
- (Dominica) Kimani Rodney (against Barbados)
- (Guyana) Max Robinson (against Costa Rica)
- (Honduras) Enmanuel Martín (against Saint Martin)
- (Collectivity of Saint Martin) Adjani van Putten (against Puerto Rico)

Source: CONCACAF

== Team of the Tournament ==
The following players were named to the tournament Best XI.

Player	Position
Clifford Gene (Haiti)	Goalkeeper
Adrián Olivardia (Panama)	Defender
Yochua Palacios (Honduras)	Defender
Steven Espinoza (El Salvador)	Defender
Máximo Carrizo (United States)	Midfielder
Kevin Khan (Canada)	Midfielder
Máximo Reyes (Mexico)	Midfielder
Isaac Badilla (Costa Rica)	Midfielder
Juban Uriarte (Nicaragua)	Forward
Chase Adams (United States)	Forward
Aidan Evans (Canada)	Forward

== Qualified teams for FIFA U-17 World Cup ==
The following eight teams from CONCACAF qualified for the 2025 FIFA U-17 World Cup in Qatar.

Team	Qualified on	Previous appearances in FIFA U-17 World Cup^{1}
El Salvador	15 February 2025	0 (debut)
Honduras	15 February 2025	5 (2007, 2009, 2013, 2015, 2017)
Panama	15 February 2025	3 (2011, 2013, 2023)
United States	15 February 2025	18 (1985, 1987, 1989, 1991, 1993, 1995, 1997, 1999, 2001, 2003, 2005, 2007, 2009, 2011, 2015, 2017, 2019, 2023)
Canada	16 February 2025	8 (1987, 1989, 1993, 1995, 2011, 2013, 2019, 2023)
Costa Rica	16 February 2025	10 (1985, 1995, 1997, 2001, 2003, 2005, 2007, 2009, 2015, 2017)
Haiti	16 February 2025	2 (2007, 2019)
Mexico	16 February 2025	15 (1985, 1987, 1991, 1993, 1997, 1999, 2003, **2005**, 2009, **2011**, 2013, 2015, 2017, 2019, 2023)

^{1} Bold indicates champions for that year. Italic indicates hosts for that year.
