= 2025 in American soccer =

Soccer in the United States
- Season: 2025

Men's soccer
- Supporters' Shield: Philadelphia Union
- USL Championship: Pittsburgh Riverhounds SC
- USL League One: One Knoxville SC
- MLS Next Pro: New York Red Bulls II
- NPSL: Hickory FC
- USL League Two: Vermont Green
- US Open Cup: Nashville SC
- MLS Cup: Inter Miami CF

Women's soccer
- NWSL: Gotham FC
- NWSL Shield: Kansas City Current
- WPSL: Sporting CT
- UWS: Edgewater Castle FC
- NWSL Challenge Cup: Washington Spirit

The 2025 season was the 113th season of competitive soccer in the United States. The season began with friendlies for the USMNT and SheBelieves Cup for the USWNT in January and February, respectively.

At the international level, qualifying MLS clubs competed in the 2025 CONCACAF Champions Cup, and qualifying NWSL clubs are competing in the inaugural 2025–26 CONCACAF W Champions Cup. Three MLS clubs, Inter Miami CF, Los Angeles FC, and Seattle Sounders FC, played in the 2025 FIFA Club World Cup, hosted by the United States.

== National teams ==
=== Men's ===
==== Senior ====
As of November 18, 2025.

Wins	Losses	Draws
10	6	2

===== Friendlies =====
January 18	United States	3–1	Venezuela	Fort Lauderdale, Florida
15:00 ET	McGlynn 37'; Agyemang 39'; Miljevic 64'	Report	Yriarte 68'	Stadium: Chase Stadium; Attendance: 18,008; Referee: Steven Madrigal (Costa Rica)

January 22	United States	3–0	Costa Rica	Orlando, Florida
19:00 ET	White 21'; Clark 77'; Agyemang 90'	Report		Stadium: Inter&Co Stadium; Attendance: 13,580; Referee: Cristhofer Corado (Guatemala)

June 7	United States	1–2	Turkey	East Hartford, Connecticut
15:30 ET	McGlynn 1'	Report	Güler 24'; Aktürkoğlu 27'	Stadium: Pratt & Whitney Stadium; Attendance: 34,023; Referee: Fernando Morón (Panama)

June 10	United States	0–4	Switzerland	Nashville, Tennessee
20:00 ET		Report	Ndoye 13'; Aebischer 23'; Embolo 33'; Manzambi 36'	Stadium: Geodis Park; Attendance: 20,602; Referee: Andrew Samuel (Trinidad and Tobago)

September 6	United States	0–2	South Korea	Harrison, New Jersey
17:00 ET		Report	Son Heung-min 18'; Lee Dong-gyeong 43'	Stadium: Sports Illustrated Stadium; Referee: Reon Radix (Grenada)

September 9	United States	2–0	Japan	Columbus, Ohio
19:30 ET	Zendejas 30'; Balogun 64'	Report		Stadium: Lower.com Field; Attendance: 20,192; Referee: Bryan Lopez (Guatemala)

October 10	United States	1–1	Ecuador	Austin, Texas
20:30 ET	Balogun 71'	Report	Valencia 24'	Stadium: Q2 Stadium; Attendance: 20,738; Referee: Filip Dujic (Canada)

October 14	United States	2–1	Australia	Commerce City, Colorado
21:00 ET	Wright 33', 51'	Report	Bos 19'	Stadium: Dick's Sporting Goods Park; Attendance: 18,218; Referee: Kwinsi Williams (Trinidad and Tobago)

November 15	United States	2–1	Paraguay	Chester, Pennsylvania
17:00 ET	Reyna 4'; Balogun 71'	Report	Arce 10'	Stadium: Subaru Park; Attendance: 17,224; Referee: Cristian Corado (Guatemala)

November 18	United States	5–1	Uruguay	Tampa, Florida
18:30 ET	Berhalter 17'; Freeman 20', 31'; Luna 42'; Tessmann 68'	Report	De Arrascaeta 45+1'	Stadium: Raymond James Stadium; Attendance: 26,110; Referee: Julio Lune (Guatemala)

===== 2024–25 CONCACAF Nations League =====
March 20 SF	United States	0–1	Panama	Inglewood, California
19:00 ET		Report	Waterman 90+4'	Stadium: SoFi Stadium; Referee: Oshane Nation (Jamaica)

March 23 3rd	Canada	2–1	United States	Inglewood, California
18:00/21:30 ET	Oluwaseyi 27'; J. David 59'		Agyemang 35'	Stadium: SoFi Stadium; Referee: Katia Itzel García (Mexico)

===== CONCACAF Gold Cup =====
====== Group D ======
Pos	Team	Pld	W	D	L	GF	GA	GD	Pts	Qualification
1	United States (H)	3	3	0	0	8	1	+7	9	Advance to knockout stage
2	Saudi Arabia	3	1	1	1	2	2	0	4	Advance to knockout stage
3	Trinidad and Tobago	3	0	2	1	2	7	−5	2	
4	Haiti	3	0	1	2	2	4	−2	1	

Source: CONCACAF
Rules for classification: Tiebreakers
(H) Co-host

June 15	United States	5–0	Trinidad and Tobago	San Jose, California
18:00 ET	Tillman 16', 41'; Agyemang 44'; B. Aaronson 82'; Wright 84'	Report		Stadium: PayPal Park; Attendance: 12,610; Referee: Adonai Escobedo (Mexico)

June 19	Saudi Arabia	0–1	United States	Austin, Texas
21:15 ET		Report	Richards 63'	Stadium: Q2 Stadium; Attendance: 11,727; Referee: Marco Ortíz (Mexico)

June 22	United States	2–1	Haiti	Arlington, Texas
19:00 ET	Tillman 10'; Agyemang 78'	Report	Louicius 19'	Stadium: AT&T Stadium; Attendance: 20,918; Referee: Katia Itzel García (Mexico)

====== Knockout ======
June 29 QF	United States	2–2 (4–3 p)	Costa Rica	Minneapolis, Minnesota
19:00 ET	Luna 43'; Arfsten 47'	Report	Calvo 12' (pen.); Martínez 71'	Stadium: U.S. Bank Stadium; Attendance: 32,289; Referee: Walter López (Guatemala)
	Penalties
	Adams (penalty scored); Tillman (penalty scored); Berhalter (penalty missed); Freeman (penalty scored); Tolkin (penalty missed); Downs (penalty scored)		(penalty scored) Martínez; (penalty missed) J. P. Vargas; (penalty scored) Van der Putten; (penalty scored) Brenes; (penalty missed) Calvo; (penalty missed) Rojas

July 2 SF	United States	2–1	Guatemala	St. Louis, Missouri
19:00 (18:00 UTC−5)	Luna 4', 15'	Report	Escobar 82'	Stadium: Energizer Park; Attendance: 20,423; Referee: Oshane Nation (Jamaica)

July 6 F	United States	1–2	Mexico	Houston, Texas
19:00 ET	Richards 4'	Report	Jiménez 27'; Álvarez 77'	Stadium: NRG Stadium; Attendance: 70,925; Referee: Mario Escobar (Guatemala)

===== Goalscorers =====
Player	Goals
Patrick Agyemang	5
Diego Luna	4
Folarin Balogun	3
Malik Tillman	3
Haji Wright	3
Alex Freeman	2
Jack McGlynn	2
Chris Richards	2
Brenden Aaronson	1
Maximilian Arfsten	1
Sebastian Berhalter	1
Caden Clark	1
Matko Miljevic	1
Giovanni Reyna	1
Tanner Tessmann	1
Brian White	1
Alejandro Zendejas	1
Total	33

==== U-20 ====
===== 2025 FIFA U-20 World Cup =====
====== Group E ======
Pos	Team	Pld	W	D	L	GF	GA	GD	Pts	Qualification
1	United States	3	2	0	1	13	3	+10	6 (Note: Tied on head-to-head points (3). Head-to-head goal difference: United States +2, South Africa 0, France −2.)	Knockout stage
2	South Africa	3	2	0	1	8	3	+5	6	Knockout stage
3	France	3	2	0	1	8	4	+4	6	Knockout stage
4	New Caledonia	3	0	0	3	1	20	−19	0	

Source: FIFA
Rules for classification: Group stage tiebreakers
Notes:

September 29	United States	9–1	New Caledonia	Rancagua, Chile
20:00	Cremaschi 2', 4', 37'; Tsakiris 7'; Westfield 28'; Norris 35', 44'; Habroune 68'; Campbell 73'	Report	Simane 70'	Stadium: Estadio El Teniente; Referee: Omar Abdulkadir Artan (Somalia)

October 2	United States	3–0	France	Rancagua, Chile
17:00	Gozo 85'; Raines 88'; Zambrano 90+2'	Report		Stadium: Estadio El Teniente; Attendance: 8,210; Referee: Gustavo Tejera (Uruguay)

October 5	South Africa	2–1	United States	Rancagua, Chile
17:00	Wynder 17' (o.g.); Kekana 45+2'	Report	Cobb 12'	Stadium: Estadio El Teniente; Attendance: 6,520; Referee: Darío Herrera (Argentina)

====== Knockout stage ======
October 9 R16	United States	3–0	Italy	Rancagua, Chile
16:30	Cremaschi 15', 90+3'; Tsakiris 79'	Report		Stadium: Estadio El Teniente; Attendance: 6,598; Referee: Gustavo Tejera (Uruguay)

October 12 QF	United States	1–3	Morocco	Rancagua, Chile
17:00	Campbell 45+6' (pen.)	Report	Zahouani 31'; Wynder 67' (o.g.); Yassine 87'	Stadium: Estadio El Teniente; Attendance: 10,742; Referee: Kevin Ortega (Peru)

==== U–17 ====
===== CONCACAF U-17 World Cup qualification =====
====== Group F ======
Pos	Team	Pld	W	D	L	GF	GA	GD	Pts	Qualification
1	United States	3	3	0	0	31	0	+31	9	2025 FIFA U-17 World Cup
2	Cuba	3	2	0	1	9	6	+3	6	
3	Saint Kitts and Nevis	3	1	0	2	10	12	−2	3	
4	U.S. Virgin Islands	3	0	0	3	5	37	−32	0	

Source: CONCACAF
Rules for classification: Tiebreakers

February 10	United States	22–0	U.S. Virgin Islands	San José, Costa Rica
8:00 pm EST	Cowell 2', 40'; Carrizo 5', 15', 28', 67'; Adams 8', 9', 13', 19', 31', 33', 38', 55', 75', 77'; Guimaraes 41'; Terry 43', 52'; Hamouda 51'; Johnson 79'; LeBlanc 86'	Report		Stadium: Estadio Nacional; Attendance: 100; Referee: Jose Valladares (HON)

February 12	Saint Kitts and Nevis	0–7	United States	San José, Costa Rica
			Uriostegui 11'; Oliveira 19'; Rosborough 24', 45+11', 69', 84'; Martínez 58'	Stadium: Estadio Nacional; Referee: Evens Julmis (Bahamas)

February 15	United States	2–0	Cuba	Alajuela, Costa Rica
	Adams 23'; Carrizo 31'			Stadium: Estadio Alejandro Morera Soto; Referee: José Valladares (Honduras)

===== 2025 FIFA U-17 World Cup =====
====== Group I ======
Pos	Team	Pld	W	D	L	GF	GA	GD	Pts	Qualification
1	United States	3	3	0	0	4	1	+3	9	Knockout stage
2	Burkina Faso	3	2	0	1	4	2	+2	6	Knockout stage
3	Czech Republic	3	1	0	2	7	4	+3	3	Knockout stage
4	Tajikistan	3	0	0	3	2	10	−8	0	

Source: FIFA
Rules for classification: Group stage tiebreakers

November 5	United States	1–0	Burkina Faso	Al Rayyan, Qatar
10:15 ET	Sullivan 79'	Report		Stadium: Aspire Zone; Referee: Sander van der Eijk (Netherlands)

November 8	United States	2–1	Tajikistan	Al Rayyan, Qatar
9:45 ET	Berchimas 30'; Sullivan 61' (pen.)	Report		Stadium: Aspire Zone; Referee: Tanguy Mebiame (Gabon)

November 11	Czech Republic	0–1	United States	Al Rayyan, Qatar
9:45 ET		Report	Albert 78'	Stadium: Aspire Zone; Referee: Yender Herrera (Venezuela)

====== Knockout stage ======
November 14 R32	United States	1–1 (3–4 p)	Morocco	Al Rayyan, Qatar
10:45 ET	Terry 21'	Report	Ouazane 90'	Stadium: Aspire Zone (pitch 7); Referee: Roberto Pérez (Peru)
	Penalties
	Sullivan (penalty scored); Sanchez (penalty missed); Adams (penalty scored); Albert (penalty scored); Carrizo (penalty missed)		(penalty scored) Baha; (penalty scored) El Aoud; (penalty scored) Dardake; (penalty missed) Mouhoub; (penalty scored) Hidaoui

=== Women's ===
==== Senior ====
As of December 1, 2025.

Wins	Losses	Draws
12	3	0

===== Friendlies =====
April 5	United States	2–0	Brazil	Inglewood, California
	Rodman 6'; Heaps 66' (pen.)	Report		Stadium: SoFi Stadium; Attendance: 32,303; Referee: Katia Itzel García (Mexico)

April 8	United States	1–2	Brazil	San Jose, California
	Marcario 1'	Report	Kerolin 24'; Amanda Gutierres 90+5'	Stadium: PayPal Park; Attendance: 18,000; Referee: Marianela Araya (Costa Rica)

May 31	United States	3–0	China	Saint Paul, Minnesota
17:30 ET	Marcario 28'; Coffey 35'; Heaps 54'			Stadium: Allianz Field; Referee: Carly Shaw-MacLaren (Canada)

June 3	United States	4–0	Jamaica	St. Louis, Missouri
20:00 ET	Sentnor 19', 29'; Biyendolo 60', 88'	Report		Stadium: Energizer Park; Referee: Astrid Gramajo (Guatemala)

June 26	United States	4–0	Republic of Ireland	Commerce City, Colorado
21:00 ET	Patterson 18'; Coffey 45+4'; Lavelle 53'; A. Thompson 63'	Report		Stadium: Dick's Sporting Goods Park; Attendance: 18,504; Referee: Vimarest Diaz (Dominican Republic)

June 29	United States	4–0	Republic of Ireland	Cincinnati, Ohio
15:00 ET	Biyendolo 11'; Rodriguez 42'; Ryan 66'; A. Thompson 86'	Report		Stadium: TQL Stadium; Attendance: 24,016; Referee: Janeishka Caban (Puerto Rico)

July 2	United States	3–0	Canada	Washington, D.C.
19:30 ET	Coffey 17'; Hutton 36'; Ryan 89'	Report		Stadium: Audi Field; Attendance: 19,215; Referee: Marianela Araya (Costa Rica)

October 23	United States	1–2	Portugal	Chester, Pennsylvania
19:00 ET	Lavelle 1'	Report	Gomes 41'; Pinto 72'	Stadium: Subaru Park; Attendance: 17,297; Referee: Merlin Soto (Honduras)

October 26	United States	3–1	Portugal	East Hartford, Connecticut
16:00 ET	Moultrie 1', 10'; Coffey 82'	Report	Silva 5'	Stadium: Pratt & Whitney Stadium; Referee: Karen Hernandez (Mexico)

October 29	United States	6–0	New Zealand	Kansas City, Missouri
20:00 ET	Sears 8', 55', 84'; Macario 34', 66'; Lavelle 44'	Report		Stadium: CPKC Stadium; Attendance: 11,044; Referee: Saphire Stockman (Costa Rica)

November 28	United States	3–0	Italy	Orlando, Florida
19:00 ET	Moultrie 2'; Macario 64', 76'	Report		Stadium: Inter&Co Stadium; Attendance: 14,199; Referee: Sandra Benitez (El Salvador)

December 1	United States	2–0	Italy	Fort Lauderdale, Florida
19:00 ET	Macario 20'; Shaw 41'	Report		Stadium: Chase Stadium; Attendance: 9,471; Referee: Priscilla Perez (Mexico)

===== SheBelieves Cup =====
Pos	Team	Pld	W	D	L	GF	GA	GD	Pts
1st place, gold medalist(s)	Japan (C)	3	3	0	0	10	2	+8	9
2nd place, silver medalist(s)	United States (H)	3	2	0	1	5	3	+2	6
3rd place, bronze medalist(s)	Colombia	3	1	0	2	3	7	−4	3
4	Australia	3	0	0	3	2	8	−6	0

Source: Soccerway
Rules for classification: 1) points; 2) goal difference; 3) goals scored; 4) head-to-head result; 5) fair play ranking.
(C) Champions; (H) Hosts

February 20	United States	2–0	Colombia	Houston, Texas
20:00 ET	Macario 33'; Sentnor 60'	Report		Stadium: Shell Energy Stadium; Attendance: 15,043; Referee: Karen Hernández (Mexico)

February 23	United States	2–1	Australia	Glendale, Arizona
17:00 ET	Biyendolo 1'; Cooper 68'	Report	Heyman 80'	Stadium: State Farm Stadium; Attendance: 23,503; Referee: Amairany Garcia (Mexico)

February 26	United States	1–2	Japan	San Diego, California
22:30 ET	Sentnor 14'	Report	Momiki 2'; Koga 50'	Stadium: Snapdragon Stadium; Attendance: 17,188; Referee: Carly Shaw-MacLaren (Canada)

- USWNT Schedule
- USWNT Results
- USA: Fixtures and Results – FIFA.com

===== Goalscorers =====
Player	Goals
Catarina Macario	8
Lynn Biyendolo	4
Sam Coffey	4
Ally Sentnor	4
Rose Lavelle	3
Olivia Moultrie	3
Emma Sears	3
Lindsey Heaps	2
Yazmeen Ryan	2
Alyssa Thompson	2
Michelle Cooper	1
Claire Hutton	1
Avery Patterson	1
Trinity Rodman	1
Izzy Rodriguez	1
Jaedyn Shaw	1
Total	41

==== U–20 ====
===== CONCACAF Women's U-20 Championship =====
====== Group A ======
Pos	Team	Pld	W	D	L	GF	GA	GD	Pts	Qualification
1	United States	3	3	0	0	15	1	+14	9	2026 FIFA U-20 Women's World Cup and Knockout stage
2	Costa Rica (H)	3	1	1	1	9	4	+5	4	2026 FIFA U-20 Women's World Cup and Knockout stage
3	Puerto Rico	3	1	1	1	8	3	+5	4	
4	Guyana	3	0	0	3	0	24	−24	0	

Source: CONCACAF
Rules for classification: Tiebreakers
(H) Hosts

May 30	United States	8–0	Guyana	Alajuela, Costa Rica
14:00	Engle 5', 24', 41', 48'; Fuller 13' (pen.); Strawn 25'; Ullmark 37'; Johnson 77'	Report		Stadium: Estadio Alejandro Morera Soto; Referee: Lizzet García (Mexico)

June 1	Puerto Rico	1–3	United States	Alajuela, Costa Rica
14:00	Gaines 67'	Report	Scott 4'; Long 24', 65'	Stadium: Estadio Alejandro Morera Soto; Referee: Dilia Bradley (Guatemala)

June 3	United States	4–0	Costa Rica	Alajuela, Costa Rica
17:00	Ullmark 22'; Long 60'; Restovich 65'; Fuller 87'	Report		Stadium: Estadio Alejandro Morera Soto; Referee: Lizzet García (Mexico)

====== Knockout stage ======
June 6 SF	United States	0–1	Canada	Alajuela, Costa Rica
12:30		Report	Larouche 56'	Stadium: Estadio Alejandro Morera Soto; Referee: Janeishka Caban (Puerto Rico)

==== U–17 ====
===== CONCACAF Women's U-17 Championship =====
====== Group C ======
Pos	Team	Pld	W	D	L	GF	GA	GD	Pts	Qualification
1	United States	3	3	0	0	17	0	+17	9	2025 FIFA U-17 Women's World Cup
2	El Salvador	3	1	1	1	5	8	−3	4	
3	Honduras	3	1	1	1	3	9	−6	4	
4	Trinidad and Tobago (H)	3	0	0	3	1	9	−8	0	

Source: CONCACAF
Rules for classification: Tiebreakers
(H) Hosts

March 31	United States	3–0	Trinidad and Tobago	Couva, Trinidad and Tobago
6:00 pm EDT	Anderson 63'; Johnson 78'; Sadler 90'	Report		Stadium: Ato Boldon Stadium; Referee: Neressa Goldson (Jamaica)

April 2	Honduras	0–7	United States	Couva, Trinidad and Tobago
3:00 pm EDT		Report	Ascanio 45'; Johnson 47'; Anderson 51', 74'; Cecil 56'; Kennedy 60'; Rodriguez 65'	Stadium: Ato Boldon Stadium; Referee: Dilia Bradley (Guatemala)

April 5	United States	7–0	El Salvador	Couva, Trinidad and Tobago
3:00 pm EDT	Johnson 10', 55' (pen.); Antonucci 30'; Anderson 47'; Rodriguez 49'; Touray 58'; Milam 74'	Report		Stadium: Ato Boldon Stadium; Referee: Marjorie Ponce (Nicaragua)

===== FIFA U-17 Women's World Cup =====
====== Group C ======
Pos	Team	Pld	W	D	L	GF	GA	GD	Pts	Qualification
1	United States	3	3	0	0	13	2	+11	9	Knockout stage
2	China	3	2	0	1	11	5	+6	6	Knockout stage
3	Ecuador	3	1	0	2	2	7	−5	3	
4	Norway	3	0	0	3	0	12	−12	0	

Source: FIFA
Rules for classification: Group stage tiebreakers

October 18	United States	3–0	Ecuador	Salé, Morocco
9:00 AM EDT	Brewer 19'; Touray 41'; Malsom 45'	Report		Stadium: Mohammed VI Football Academy; Attendance: 555; Referee: Alina Peșu (Romania)

October 21	United States	5–2	China	Salé, Morocco
12:00 PM EDT	Malsom 27', 68'; DiMaria 44'; Touray 45+3', 62'	Report	Zhou Xinyi 12'; Zeng Yijie 85'	Stadium: Mohammed VI Football Academy; Attendance: 889; Referee: Charly Straub (Brazil)

October 24	Norway	0–5	United States	Salé, Morocco
9:00 AM EDT		Report	Ream 6'; Kocher 49'; Touray 63'; Whitham 64'; Johnson 80'	Stadium: Mohammed VI Football Academy; Attendance: 389; Referee: Milagros Arruela (Peru)

====== Knockout stage ======
October 28	United States	1–1 (6–7 p)	Netherlands	Salé, Morocco
	Johnson 57'	Report	Pennock 3'	Stadium: Mohammed VI Football Academy; Attendance: 481; Referee: Alina Peșu (Romania)
	Penalties
	Schmidt (penalty scored); Malsom (penalty scored); Johnson (penalty scored); Cecil (penalty scored); Ream (penalty scored); Touray (penalty scored); Sadler (penalty missed)		(penalty scored) Renfurm; (penalty scored) Hubert; (penalty scored) Thomassen; (penalty scored) Vinckers; (penalty scored) Dap; (penalty scored) Pennock; (penalty scored) Van der Vliet
Note: Netherlands advance on penalties 7–6.

== Club competitions ==
=== Men's ===
==== League competitions ====
===== Major League Soccer =====
====== Conference tables ======
Eastern Conference

MLS Eastern Conference table (2025)
Pos	Team	Pld	W	L	T	GF	GA	GD	Pts	Qualification
1	Philadelphia Union	34	20	8	6	57	35	+22	66	Qualification for round one and the CONCACAF Champions Cup round one
2	FC Cincinnati	34	20	9	5	52	40	+12	65	Qualification for round one
3	Inter Miami CF (C)	34	19	7	8	81	55	+26	65	Qualification for round one
4	Charlotte FC	34	19	13	2	55	46	+9	59	Qualification for round one
5	New York City FC	34	17	12	5	50	44	+6	56	Qualification for round one
6	Nashville SC	34	16	12	6	58	45	+13	54	Qualification for round one
7	Columbus Crew	34	14	8	12	55	51	+4	54	Qualification for round one
8	Chicago Fire FC	34	15	11	8	68	60	+8	53	Qualification for the wild card round
9	Orlando City SC	34	14	9	11	63	51	+12	53	Qualification for the wild card round
10	New York Red Bulls	34	12	15	7	48	47	+1	43	
11	New England Revolution	34	9	16	9	44	51	−7	36	
12	Toronto FC	34	6	14	14	37	44	−7	32	
13	CF Montréal	34	6	18	10	34	60	−26	28	
14	Atlanta United FC	34	5	16	13	38	63	−25	28	
15	D.C. United	34	5	18	11	30	66	−36	26	

Source: MLS
Rules for classification: 1) points; 2) total wins; 3) total goal differential; 4) total goals scored; 5) fewer disciplinary points; 6) away goal differential; 7) away goals scored; 8) home goals differential; 9) home goals scored; 10) coin toss (2 clubs tied) or drawing of lots (≥3 clubs tied)
(C) MLS Cup champions

Western Conference

MLS Western Conference table (2025)
Pos	Team	Pld	W	L	T	GF	GA	GD	Pts	Qualification
1	San Diego FC	34	19	9	6	64	41	+23	63	Qualification for round one and the CONCACAF Champions Cup round one
2	Vancouver Whitecaps FC	34	18	7	9	66	38	+28	63	Qualification for round one
3	Los Angeles FC	34	17	8	9	65	40	+25	60	Qualification for round one
4	Minnesota United FC	34	16	8	10	56	39	+17	58	Qualification for round one
5	Seattle Sounders FC	34	15	9	10	58	48	+10	55	Qualification for round one
6	Austin FC	34	13	13	8	37	45	−8	47	Qualification for round one
7	FC Dallas	34	11	12	11	52	55	−3	44	Qualification for round one
8	Portland Timbers	34	11	12	11	41	48	−7	44	Qualification for the wild card round
9	Real Salt Lake	34	12	17	5	38	49	−11	41	Qualification for the wild card round
10	San Jose Earthquakes	34	11	15	8	60	63	−3	41	
11	Colorado Rapids	34	11	15	8	44	56	−12	41	
12	Houston Dynamo FC	34	9	15	10	43	56	−13	37	
13	St. Louis City SC	34	8	18	8	44	58	−14	32	
14	LA Galaxy	34	7	18	9	46	66	−20	30	
15	Sporting Kansas City	34	7	20	7	46	70	−24	28	

Source: MLS
Rules for classification: 1) points; 2) total wins; 3) total goal differential; 4) total goals scored; 5) fewer disciplinary points; 6) away goal differential; 7) away goals scored; 8) home goals differential; 9) home goals scored; 10) coin toss (2 clubs tied) or drawing of lots (≥3 clubs tied)

====== Overall 2025 table ======
Note: the table below has no impact on playoff qualification and is used solely for determining host of the MLS Cup, certain CCL spots, the Supporters' Shield trophy, seeding in the 2026 Canadian Championship, and 2025 MLS draft. The conference tables are the sole determinant for teams qualifying for the playoffs.

Overall MLS standings table (2025)
Pos	Team	Pld	W	L	T	GF	GA	GD	Pts	Qualification
1	Philadelphia Union (S)	34	20	8	6	57	35	+22	66	Qualification for the CONCACAF Champions Cup round one (Note: As 2025 MLS Supporters' Shield champions)
2	FC Cincinnati	34	20	9	5	52	40	+12	65	Qualification for the CONCACAF Champions Cup round one (Note: As highest-ranked club in 2025 MLS Supporters' Shield not already qualified)
3	Inter Miami CF (C)	34	19	7	8	81	55	+26	65	Qualification for the CONCACAF Champions Cup round of 16 (Note: As 2025 MLS Cup champions)
4	San Diego FC	34	19	9	6	64	41	+23	63	Qualification for the CONCACAF Champions Cup round one (Note: As Western Conference regular season winners)
5	Vancouver Whitecaps FC (V)	34	18	7	9	66	38	+28	63	Qualification for the CONCACAF Champions Cup round one (Note: As second highest-ranked club in 2025 MLS Supporters' Shield not already qualified)
6	Los Angeles FC	34	17	8	9	65	40	+25	60	Qualification for the CONCACAF Champions Cup round one (Note: As third highest-ranked club in 2025 MLS Supporters' Shield not already qualified)
7	Charlotte FC	34	19	13	2	55	46	+9	59	
8	Minnesota United FC	34	16	8	10	56	39	+17	58	
9	New York City FC	34	17	12	5	50	44	+6	56	
10	Seattle Sounders FC (L)	34	15	9	10	58	48	+10	55	Qualification for the CONCACAF Champions Cup round of 16 (Note: As winners of Leagues Cup)
11	Nashville SC (U)	34	16	12	6	58	45	+13	54	Qualification for the CONCACAF Champions Cup round one (Note: As winners of U.S. Open Cup)
12	Columbus Crew	34	14	8	12	55	51	+4	54	
13	Chicago Fire FC	34	15	11	8	68	60	+8	53	
14	Orlando City SC	34	14	9	11	63	51	+12	53	
15	Austin FC	34	13	13	8	37	45	−8	47	
16	FC Dallas	34	11	12	11	52	55	−3	44	
17	Portland Timbers	34	11	12	11	41	48	−7	44	
18	New York Red Bulls	34	12	15	7	48	47	+1	43	
19	Real Salt Lake	34	12	17	5	38	49	−11	41	
20	San Jose Earthquakes	34	11	15	8	60	63	−3	41	
21	Colorado Rapids	34	11	15	8	44	56	−12	41	
22	Houston Dynamo FC	34	9	15	10	43	56	−13	37	
23	New England Revolution	34	9	16	9	44	51	−7	36	
24	St. Louis City SC	34	8	18	8	44	58	−14	32	
25	Toronto FC	34	6	14	14	37	44	−7	32	
26	LA Galaxy	34	7	18	9	46	66	−20	30	Qualification for the CONCACAF Champions Cup round one (Note: As third place of Leagues Cup)
27	Sporting Kansas City	34	7	20	7	46	70	−24	28	
28	CF Montréal	34	6	18	10	34	60	−26	28	
29	Atlanta United FC	34	5	16	13	38	63	−25	28	
30	D.C. United	34	5	18	11	30	66	−36	26	

Source: MLS
Rules for classification: 1) points; 2) total wins; 3) total goal differential; 4) total goals scored; 5) fewer disciplinary points; 6) away goal differential; 7) away goals scored; 8) home goals differential; 9) home goals scored; 10) coin toss (2 clubs tied) or drawing of lots (≥3 clubs tied)
(C) MLS Cup champions; (L) Leagues Cup winners; (S) Supporters' Shield winners; (U) U.S. Open Cup winners; (V) Canadian Championship winners

====== MLS All-Star Game ======
2025 MLS All-Star Game
July 23, 2025
8:00 p.m. CDT

MLS All-Stars (United States) (Canada)	3–1	(Mexico) Liga MX All-Stars
Surridge 28'; Baribo 51'; White 80'	Report	Mora 64'

Q2 Stadium, Austin, Texas
Attendance: 20,738
Referee: Rosendo Mendoza (United States)

====== MLS Playoffs ======
Bracket

The higher seeded teams hosted single-elimination matches, with the MLS Cup host determined by overall points in the Supporters' Shield table. During the best-of-three round, the team with higher seed hosted the first match (and the third match, if required).

Wild card single match
E8	**Chicago Fire FC**	**3**
E9	Orlando City SC	1
W8	**Portland Timbers**	**3**
W9	Real Salt Lake	1

Round one best-of-three series
E1	**Philadelphia Union**	**2 (4)**	**3**	–
E8	Chicago Fire FC	2 (2)	0	–
E4	Charlotte FC	0	**0 (7)**	1
E5	**New York City FC**	**1**	0 (6)	**3**
E3	**Inter Miami CF**	**3**	1	**4**
E6	Nashville SC	1	**2**	0
E2	**FC Cincinnati**	**1**	0	**2**
E7	Columbus Crew	0	**4**	1
W1	**San Diego FC**	**2**	2 (2)	**4**
W8	Portland Timbers	1	**2 (3)**	0
W4	**Minnesota United FC**	**0 (3)**	2	**3 (7)**
W5	Seattle Sounders FC	0 (2)	**4**	3 (6)
W3	**Los Angeles FC**	**2**	**4**	–
W6	Austin FC	1	1	–
W2	**Vancouver Whitecaps FC**	**3**	**1 (4)**	–
W7	FC Dallas	0	1 (2)	–

Conference semifinals single match
E1	Philadelphia Union	0
E5	**New York City FC**	**1**
**Eastern Conference**
E3	**Inter Miami CF**	**4**
E2	FC Cincinnati	0
W1	**San Diego FC**	**1**
W4	Minnesota United FC	0
**Western Conference**
W3	Los Angeles FC	2 (3)
W2	**Vancouver Whitecaps FC (p)**	**2 (4)**

Conference finals single match
E5	New York City FC	1
E3	**Inter Miami CF**	**5**
W1	San Diego FC	1
W2	**Vancouver Whitecaps FC**	**3**

MLS Cup single match
E3	**Inter Miami CF**	**3**
W2	Vancouver Whitecaps FC	1

====== MLS Cup ======
December 6, 2025
2:30 p.m. EST

Inter Miami CF	3–1	Vancouver Whitecaps FC
Ocampo 8' (o.g.); De Paul 71'; Allende 90+6'	Report	Ahmed 60'

Chase Stadium, Fort Lauderdale, Florida
Attendance: 21,556
Referee: Drew Fischer

===== USL Championship =====
====== Conference tables ======
Eastern Conference

Pos	Team	Pld	W	L	T	GF	GA	GD	Pts	Qualification
1	Louisville City FC (S)	30	22	1	7	56	19	+37	73	Playoffs
2	Charleston Battery	30	19	6	5	62	32	+30	62	Playoffs
3	North Carolina FC	30	13	11	6	40	39	+1	45	Playoffs
4	Pittsburgh Riverhounds SC (C)	30	12	10	8	32	28	+4	44 (Note: Pittsburgh Riverhounds SC are ahead of Hartford Athletic on head-to-head points. PGH 6, HFD 0.)	Playoffs
5	Hartford Athletic	30	13	12	5	48	36	+12	44	Playoffs
6	Loudoun United FC	30	12	12	6	45	48	−3	42	Playoffs
7	Rhode Island FC	30	10	12	8	29	28	+1	38	Playoffs
8	Detroit City FC	30	9	11	10	33	35	−2	37	Playoffs
9	Indy Eleven	30	10	15	5	44	52	−8	35	
10	Tampa Bay Rowdies	30	9	14	7	43	50	−7	34	
11	Miami FC	30	8	16	6	29	44	−15	30	
12	Birmingham Legion FC	30	5	13	12	36	50	−14	27	

Source: USL Championship Standings
Rules for classification: 1) head-to-head points; 2) head-to-head goal differential; 3) points-per-game within conference; 4) total wins; 5) total goal differential; 6) total goals scored; 7) points earned against top four Conference finishers; 8) disciplinary points; 9) coin toss or drawing of lots
(C) Champions; (S) Players' Shield winner
Notes:

Western Conference

Pos	Team	Pld	W	L	T	GF	GA	GD	Pts	Qualification
1	FC Tulsa	30	16	5	9	50	30	+20	57	Playoffs
2	Sacramento Republic FC	30	13	8	9	44	27	+17	48 (Note: Sacramento Republic FC are ahead of New Mexico United on head-to-head points: SAC 6, NMU 0.)	Playoffs
3	New Mexico United	30	14	10	6	45	41	+4	48	Playoffs
4	El Paso Locomotive FC	30	10	9	11	47	45	+2	41	Playoffs
5	Phoenix Rising FC	30	9	8	13	48	48	0	40 (Note: Phoenix Rising FC are ahead of San Antonio FC on head-to-head points: PHX 6, SAN 0.)	Playoffs
6	San Antonio FC	30	11	12	7	39	38	+1	40	Playoffs
7	Orange County SC	30	10	11	9	44	45	−1	39	Playoffs
8	Colorado Springs Switchbacks FC	30	10	13	7	35	47	−12	37	Playoffs
9	Lexington SC	30	9	12	9	31	42	−11	36	
10	Oakland Roots SC	30	8	14	8	42	52	−10	32	
11	Monterey Bay FC	30	7	15	8	27	45	−18	29	
12	Las Vegas Lights FC	30	6	15	9	23	50	−27	27	

Source: USL Championship Standings
Rules for classification: 1) head-to-head points; 2) head-to-head goal differential; 3) points-per-game within conference; 4) total wins; 5) total goal differential; 6) total goals scored; 7) points earned against top four Conference finishers; 8) disciplinary points; 9) coin toss or drawing of lots

====== USL Championship Playoffs ======
Bracket

Conference Quarterfinals; November 1–2	Conference Semifinals; November 8
E1	Louisville City FC	0
**E8**	**Detroit City FC**	**1**
E8	Detroit City FC	0 (3)
**E4**	**Pittsburgh Riverhounds SC**	**0 (4)**
**E4**	**Pittsburgh Riverhounds SC (p)**	**0 (4)**
E5	Hartford Athletic	0 (2)
**Eastern Conference**
**E3**	**North Carolina FC**	**1**
E6	Loudoun United FC	0
E3	North Carolina FC	0
**E7**	**Rhode Island FC**	**2**
E2	Charleston Battery	0 (3)
**E7**	**Rhode Island FC (p)**	**0 (5)**
**W1**	**FC Tulsa (a.e.t.)**	**1**
W8	Colorado Springs Switchbacks FC	0
**W1**	**FC Tulsa (a.e.t.)**	**1**
W5	Phoenix Rising FC	0
W4	El Paso Locomotive FC	0
**W5**	**Phoenix Rising FC**	**1**
**Western Conference**
**W3**	**New Mexico United**	**2**
W6	San Antonio FC	0
**W3**	**New Mexico United**	**2**
W7	Orange County SC	1
W2	Sacramento Republic FC	0 (4)
**W7**	**Orange County SC**	**0 (5)**

Conference Finals; November 14–16
**E4**	**Pittsburgh Riverhounds SC**	**1**
E7	Rhode Island FC	0
**W1**	**FC Tulsa**	**3**
W3	New Mexico United	0

USL Championship Final; November 22
**E4**	**Pittsburgh Riverhounds SC (p)**	**0 (5)**
W1	FC Tulsa	0 (3)

====== USL Championship Final ======
November 22, 2025
10:00 AM (MST)

FC Tulsa	0–0 (a.e.t.)	Pittsburgh Riverhounds SC
Dalou (yellow card) 57'; Peñaranda (yellow card) 69'; Webber (yellow card) 74'	Report	Griffin (yellow card) 90+4'
Penalties
Calheira (penalty scored); Lukic (penalty missed); Colli (penalty scored); Batista (penalty scored)	3–5	(penalty scored) Jacquesson; (penalty scored) Mertz; (penalty scored) Boone; (penalty scored) Suber; (penalty scored) Ydrach

Oneok Field, Tulsa, Oklahoma
Attendance: 9,507
Referee: Elijio Arreguin

===== USL League One =====
====== League table ======
Pos	Team	Pld	W	L	T	GF	GA	GD	Pts	Qualification
1	One Knoxville SC (S, C)	30	16	5	9	43	26	+17	57	Playoffs
2	Chattanooga Red Wolves SC	30	15	5	10	42	30	+12	55	Playoffs
3	Spokane Velocity FC	30	14	7	9	41	35	+6	51	Playoffs
4	FC Naples	30	13	9	8	40	32	+8	47	Playoffs
5	Union Omaha	30	13	10	7	51	39	+12	46	Playoffs
6	South Georgia Tormenta FC	30	13	11	6	55	47	+8	45 (Note: South Georgia is ahead of Portland on total wins, South Georgia 13, Portland 11)	Playoffs
7	Portland Hearts of Pine	30	11	7	12	48	38	+10	45	Playoffs
8	Charlotte Independence	30	10	13	7	45	50	−5	37	Playoffs
9	AV Alta FC	30	8	10	12	42	47	−5	36	
10	Forward Madison FC	30	8	11	11	31	43	−12	35	
11	Greenville Triumph SC	30	8	14	8	38	43	−5	32	
12	Texoma FC	30	7	14	9	35	55	−20	30	
13	Richmond Kickers	30	8	17	5	43	53	−10	29	
14	Westchester SC	30	5	16	9	43	59	−16	24	

Source: USL League One
Rules for classification: 1) points; 2) total wins; 3) total goal differential; 4) total goals scored; 5) points earned against top four finishers; 6) disciplinary points; 7) drawing of lots.
(C) Champions; (S) Players' Shield winner
Notes:

Bracket

**Quarterfinals**
1	(Tennessee) **One Knoxville SC**	**2**
8	(North Carolina) Charlotte Independence	1
4	(Florida) **FC Naples**	**0 (4)**
5	(Nebraska) Union Omaha	0 (3)
2	(Tennessee) Chattanooga Red Wolves SC	0
7	(Maine) **Portland Hearts of Pine**	**1**
3	(Washington (state)) **Spokane Velocity**	**1 (4)**
6	(Georgia (U.S. state)) South Georgia Tormenta FC	1 (3)

**Semifinals**
1	(Tennessee) **One Knoxville SC**	1
4	(Florida) FC Naples	0
7	(Maine) Portland Hearts of Pine	2 (5)
3	(Washington (state)) **Spokane Velocity**	2 (6)

**Final**
1	(Tennessee) **One Knoxville SC**	2
3	(Washington (state)) Spokane Velocity	0

====== USL League One Final ======
November 16, 2025
5:00 PM EST

One Knoxville SC	2–0	Spokane Velocity FC
Rosamilia 4'; Tekiela 54' (pen.); Caputo (yellow card) 66'; Diene (yellow card) 72'	Report

Covenant Health Park, Knoxville, Tennessee
Attendance: 7,500
Referee: Brandon Stevis

Championship Game MVP: (United States) Nico Rosamilia (KNX)

===== MLS Next Pro =====
====== Eastern Conference ======
Pos	Div	Team	Pld	W	SOW	SOL	L	GF	GA	GD	Pts	Qualification
1	NE	New York Red Bulls II (C)	28	17	2	3	6	68	56	+12	58	Qualification for the Playoffs
2	NE	Philadelphia Union II	28	15	5	3	5	64	34	+30	58	Qualification for the Playoffs
3	NE	New England Revolution II	28	14	5	2	7	54	37	+17	54	Qualification for the Playoffs
4	SE	Chattanooga FC	28	13	5	4	6	42	36	+6	53	Qualification for the Playoffs
5	SE	Huntsville City FC	28	14	4	2	8	56	32	+24	52	Qualification for the Playoffs
6	NE	Chicago Fire FC II	28	12	5	2	9	69	58	+11	48	Qualification for the Playoffs
7	NE	FC Cincinnati 2	28	9	7	0	12	40	41	−1	41	Qualification for the Playoffs
8	SE	Carolina Core FC	28	8	5	5	10	42	44	−2	39	Qualification for the Playoffs
9	NE	Toronto FC II	28	10	2	4	12	34	42	−8	38	
10	SE	Atlanta United 2	28	9	2	7	10	44	43	+1	38	
11	SE	Orlando City B	28	9	4	2	13	38	55	−17	37	
12	NE	New York City FC II	28	9	2	4	13	53	61	−8	35	
13	SE	Crown Legacy FC	28	7	3	5	13	45	54	−9	32	
14	SE	Inter Miami CF II	28	6	1	5	16	40	72	−32	25	
15	NE	Columbus Crew 2	28	5	1	5	17	40	64	−24	22	

Source: MLSNP
Rules for classification: 1) points; 2) total regulation wins; 3) total goal differential; 4) total goals scored; 5) total shootout wins; 6) away goal differential; 7) away goals scored; 8) home goals differential; 9) home goals scored; 10) fewer disciplinary points; 11) drawing of lots
(C) Champion

====== Western Conference ======
Pos	Div	Team	Pld	W	SOW	SOL	L	GF	GA	GD	Pts	Qualification
1	FR	St. Louis City 2	28	17	5	1	5	60	37	+23	62	Qualification for the Playoffs
2	PC	The Town FC	28	14	4	2	8	59	36	+23	52	Qualification for the Playoffs
3	FR	Colorado Rapids 2	28	15	1	4	8	55	40	+15	51	Qualification for the Playoffs
4	PC	Real Monarchs	28	13	4	4	7	55	42	+13	51	Qualification for the Playoffs
5	FR	Minnesota United FC 2	28	12	2	4	10	45	42	+3	44	Qualification for the Playoffs
6	FR	North Texas SC	28	11	4	2	11	46	56	−10	43	Qualification for the Playoffs
7	PC	Whitecaps FC 2	28	11	4	1	12	61	54	+7	42	Qualification for the Playoffs
8	PC	Ventura County FC	28	11	2	4	11	48	51	−3	41	Qualification for the Playoffs
9	FR	Austin FC II	28	10	3	5	10	35	36	−1	41	
10	PC	Portland Timbers 2	28	10	2	4	12	47	54	−7	38	
11	FR	Houston Dynamo 2	28	9	4	2	13	40	47	−7	37	
12	PC	Tacoma Defiance	28	10	2	2	14	62	67	−5	36	
13	PC	Los Angeles FC 2	28	9	2	2	15	47	61	−14	33	
14	FR	Sporting Kansas City II	28	3	2	4	19	30	67	−37	17	

Source: MLSNP
Rules for classification: 1) points; 2) total regulation wins; 3) total goal differential; 4) total goals scored; 5) total shootout wins; 6) away goal differential; 7) away goals scored; 8) home goals differential; 9) home goals scored; 10) fewer disciplinary points; 11) drawing of lots

====== Overall table ======
Pos	Div	Team	Pld	W	SOW	SOL	L	GF	GA	GD	Pts	Awards
1	FR	St. Louis City 2	28	17	5	1	5	60	37	+23	62	Regular season champion
2	NE	New York Red Bulls II (C)	28	17	2	3	6	68	56	+12	58	
3	NE	Philadelphia Union II	28	15	5	3	5	64	34	+30	58	
4	NE	New England Revolution II	28	14	5	2	7	54	37	+17	54	
5	SE	Chattanooga FC	28	13	5	4	6	42	36	+6	53	
6	SE	Huntsville City FC	28	14	4	2	8	56	32	+24	52	
7	PC	The Town FC	28	14	4	2	8	59	36	+23	52	
8	FR	Colorado Rapids 2	28	15	1	4	8	55	40	+15	51	
9	PC	Real Monarchs	28	13	4	4	7	55	42	+13	51	
10	NE	Chicago Fire FC II	28	12	5	2	9	69	58	+11	48	
11	FR	Minnesota United FC 2	28	12	2	4	10	45	42	+3	44	
12	FR	North Texas SC	28	11	4	2	11	46	56	−10	43	
13	PC	Whitecaps FC 2	28	11	4	1	12	61	54	+7	42	
14	PC	Ventura County FC	28	11	2	4	11	48	51	−3	41	
15	FR	Austin FC II	28	10	3	5	10	35	36	−1	41	
16	NE	FC Cincinnati 2	28	9	7	0	12	40	41	−1	41	
17	SE	Carolina Core FC	28	8	5	5	10	42	44	−2	39	
18	PC	Portland Timbers 2	28	10	2	4	12	47	54	−7	38	
19	NE	Toronto FC II	28	10	2	4	12	34	42	−8	38	
20	SE	Atlanta United 2	28	9	2	7	10	44	43	+1	38	
21	FR	Houston Dynamo 2	28	9	4	2	13	40	47	−7	37	
22	SE	Orlando City B	28	9	4	2	13	38	55	−17	37	
23	PC	Tacoma Defiance	28	10	2	2	14	62	67	−5	36	
24	NE	New York City FC II	28	9	2	4	13	53	61	−8	35	
25	PC	Los Angeles FC 2	28	9	2	2	15	47	61	−14	33	
26	SE	Crown Legacy FC	28	7	3	5	13	45	54	−9	32	
27	SE	Inter Miami CF II	28	6	1	5	16	40	72	−32	25	
28	NE	Columbus Crew 2	28	5	1	5	17	40	64	−24	22	
29	FR	Sporting Kansas City II	28	3	2	4	19	30	67	−37	17	

Source: MLSNP
Rules for classification: 1) points; 2) total regulation wins; 3) total goal differential; 4) total goals scored; 5) total shootout wins; 6) away goal differential; 7) away goals scored; 8) home goals differential; 9) home goals scored; 10) fewer disciplinary points; 11) drawing of lots
(C) Champion

====== MLS Next Pro Playoffs ======
Bracket

Conference Quarterfinals (October 19)	Conference Semifinals (October 25 & 26)
**E1**	**New York Red Bulls II**	**5**
E8	Carolina Core FC	1
**E1**	**New York Red Bulls II**	**5**
E6	Chicago Fire FC II	3
E3	New England Revolution II	0
**E6**	**Chicago Fire FC II**	**1**
**Eastern Conference**
**E2**	**Philadelphia Union II**	**2**
E7	FC Cincinnati II	1
**E2**	**Philadelphia Union II**	**1**
E5	Huntsville City FC	0
E4	Chattanooga FC	0
**E5**	**Huntsville City FC**	**2**
**W2**	**The Town FC**	**3**
W6	North Texas SC	0
W2	The Town FC	2
**W3**	**Colorado Rapids 2**	**4**
**W3**	**Colorado Rapids 2**	**3**
W7	Vancouver Whitecaps 2	2
**Western Conference**
**W1**	**St. Louis City 2**	**3**
W8	Ventura County FC	0
W1	St. Louis City 2	0
**W5**	**Minnesota United FC 2**	**2**
W4	Real Monarchs	1
**W5**	**Minnesota United FC 2**	**2**

Conference Finals (November 1 & 2)
**E1**	**New York Red Bulls II**	**2**
E2	Philadelphia Union II	1
**W3**	**Colorado Rapids 2**	**2**
W5	Minnesota United FC 2	1

MLS Next Pro Final (November 8)
**E1**	**New York Red Bulls II**	**3 (3)**
W3	Colorado Rapids 2	3 (1)

====== 2025 MLS Next Pro Cup Final ======
November 8
7:00 PM EST

New York Red Bulls II	3–3 (a.e.t.)	Colorado Rapids 2
Mosquera 65', 81' (pen.); Mitchell (yellow card) 65' (goal) 67'; Worth (yellow card) 90'; Collahuazo (yellow card) 90+6'	Report	Diop 34'; Cameron 45+1'; García 78'; Flores (yellow card) 88'
Penalties
Worth (penalty scored); Jiménez (penalty scored); Rojas (penalty scored)	3–1	(penalty missed) Rosa; (penalty missed) Diop; (penalty scored) García; (penalty missed) Harris

Sports Illustrated Stadium, Harrison, New Jersey
Attendance: 9,095
Referee: Jeremy Scheer

Most Valuable Player: (Panama) Rafael Mosquera (New York Red Bulls II)

==== Cup competitions ====
===== US Open Cup =====
====== Final ======
October 1, 2025
7:00 p.m. CDT

Austin FC (Texas)	1–2	(Tennessee) Nashville SC
Uzuni 45+1'	Report	Mukhtar 17'; Surridge 60' (pen.)

Q2 Stadium, Austin, Texas
Attendance: 20,738
Referee: Tori Penso

===== USL Cup =====
====== Final ======
October 4
10:00 PM EDT

Sacramento Republic FC	0–1	Hartford Athletic
	Report	Careaga 51'

Heart Health Park, Sacramento, California
Attendance: 11,569
Referee: Matthew Corrigan

===== National Independent Soccer Association Pro Cup =====
====== Final ======
October 21, 2025

Los Angeles Force	4–1	Capo FC
Salazar 74'; Joel Quist 96', 100'; Bryan Ortega 120'	Report	Daniel Moreno

Michigan Stars Sports Center, Washington, Michigan

==== International competitions ====
===== FIFA Club World Cup =====
====== Play-in match ======
Team 1	Score	Team 2
Los Angeles FC (United States)	2–1 (a.e.t.)	(Mexico) América

====== Group A ======
Pos	Team	Pld	W	D	L	GF	GA	GD	Pts	Qualification
1	(Brazil) Palmeiras	3	1	2	0	4	2	+2	**5 (Note: Tied on head-to-head result (Inter Miami CF 2–2 Palmeiras). Overall goal difference was used as the tiebreaker.)**	**Advance to knockout stage**
**2**	(United States) Inter Miami CF	**3**	**1**	**2**	**0**	**4**	**3**	**+1**	**5**	**Advance to knockout stage**
3	(Portugal) Porto	3	0	2	1	5	6	−1	**2 (Note: Tied on head-to-head result (Porto 4–4 Al Ahly). Overall goal difference was used as the tiebreaker.)**	
4	(Egypt) Al Ahly	3	0	2	1	4	6	−2	**2**	

Source: FIFA
Notes:

Matches

June 14 Group stage	**Al Ahly (Egypt)**	**0–0**	**(United States) Inter Miami CF**	Miami Gardens, Florida
8:00 pm EDT		Report		Stadium: Hard Rock Stadium; Attendance: 60,927; Referee: Alireza Faghani (Australia)

June 19 Group stage	**Inter Miami CF (United States)**	**2–1**	**(Portugal) Porto**	Atlanta, Georgia
3:00 pm EDT		Report		Stadium: Mercedes-Benz Stadium

June 23 Group stage	**Inter Miami CF (United States)**	**2–2**	**(Brazil) Palmeiras**	Miami Gardens, Florida
9:00 pm EDT		Report		Stadium: Hard Rock Stadium

====== Group B ======
Pos	Team	Pld	W	D	L	GF	GA	GD	Pts	Qualification
1	(France) Paris Saint-Germain	3	2	0	1	6	1	+5	**6 (Note: Tied on head-to-head points (3). Head-to-head goal difference: Paris Saint-Germain +3, Botafogo 0, Atlético Madrid –3.)**	Advance to knockout stage
2	(Brazil) Botafogo	3	2	0	1	3	2	+1	**6**	Advance to knockout stage
3	(Spain) Atlético Madrid	3	2	0	1	4	5	−1	**6**	
**4**	(United States) Seattle Sounders FC	**3**	**0**	**0**	**3**	**2**	**7**	**−5**	**0**	

Source: FIFA
Notes:

Matches

June 15 Group stage	**Botafogo (Brazil)**	**2–1**	**(United States) Seattle Sounders FC**	Seattle, Washington
7:00 pm PDT		Report		Stadium: Lumen Field

June 19 Group stage	**Seattle Sounders FC (United States)**	**1–3**	**(Spain) Atlético Madrid**	Seattle, Washington
3:00 pm PDT		Report		Stadium: Lumen Field

June 23 3	**Seattle Sounders FC (United States)**	**0–2**	**(France) Paris Saint-Germain**	Seattle, Washington
12:00 pm PDT		Report		Stadium: Lumen Field

====== Group D ======
Pos	Team	Pld	W	D	L	GF	GA	GD	Pts	Qualification
1	(Brazil) Flamengo	3	2	1	0	6	2	+4	**7**	Advance to knockout stage
2	(England) Chelsea	3	2	0	1	6	3	+3	**6**	Advance to knockout stage
3	(Tunisia) Espérance de Tunis	3	1	0	2	1	5	−4	**3**	
**4**	(United States) Los Angeles FC	**3**	**0**	**1**	**2**	**1**	**4**	**−3**	**1**	

Source: FIFA

Matches

June 16 Group stage	**Chelsea (England)**	**2–0**	**(United States) Los Angeles FC**	Atlanta, Georgia
12:00 pm PDT		Report		Stadium: Mercedes-Benz Stadium

June 20 Group stage	**Los Angeles FC (United States)**	**0–1**	**(Tunisia) Espérance de Tunis**	Nashville, Tennessee
3:00 pm PDT		Report		Stadium: Geodis Park

June 24 Group stage	**Los Angeles FC (United States)**	**1–1**	**(Brazil) Flamengo**	Orlando, Florida
6:00 pm PDT		Report		Stadium: Camping World Stadium

====== Knockout stage ======
Round of 16

June 29	**Paris Saint-Germain (France)**	**4–0**	**(United States) Inter Miami CF**	Atlanta, Georgia
12:00 p.m. EDT	Neves 6', 39'; Aviles 44'; Hakimi 45+3'	Report		Stadium: Mercedes-Benz Stadium

==== CONCACAF competitions ====
===== CONCACAF Champions Cup =====
Club	Competition	Final round
Columbus Crew	2025 CONCACAF Champions Cup	Round of 16
Los Angeles FC	2025 CONCACAF Champions Cup	Quarter-finals
Colorado Rapids	2025 CONCACAF Champions Cup	Round One
Inter Miami CF	2025 CONCACAF Champions Cup	Semi-finals
LA Galaxy	2025 CONCACAF Champions Cup	Quarter-finals
FC Cincinnati	2025 CONCACAF Champions Cup	Round of 16
Real Salt Lake	2025 CONCACAF Champions Cup	Round One
Sporting Kansas City	2025 CONCACAF Champions Cup	Round One
Seattle Sounders FC	2025 CONCACAF Champions Cup	Round of 16

teams in bold are still active in the competition

====== Round one ======
Team 1	Agg.	Team 2	1st leg	2nd leg
Colorado Rapids (United States)	2–2 (a)	(United States) Los Angeles FC	2–1	0–1
Sporting Kansas City (United States)	1–4	(United States) Inter Miami CF	0–1	1–3
Antigua (Guatemala)	2–6	(United States) Seattle Sounders FC	1–3	1–3
Motagua (Honduras)	2–5	(United States) FC Cincinnati	1–4	1–1
Herediano (Costa Rica)	2–1	(United States) Real Salt Lake	0–0	2–1

====== Round of 16 ======
Team 1	Agg.	Team 2	1st leg	2nd leg
Los Angeles FC (United States)	4–2	(United States) Columbus Crew	3–0	1–2
Inter Miami CF (United States)	4–0	(Jamaica) Cavalier	2–0	2–0
Seattle Sounders FC (United States)	1–4	(Mexico) Cruz Azul	0–0	1–4
FC Cincinnati (United States)	2–4	(Mexico) UANL	1–1	1–3
Herediano (Costa Rica)	2–4	(United States) LA Galaxy	1–0	1–4

====== Quarter-final ======
Team 1	Agg.	Team 2	1st leg	2nd leg
Los Angeles FC (United States)	2–3	(United States) Inter Miami CF	1–0	1–3
LA Galaxy (United States)	2–3	(Mexico) UANL	0–0	2–3

====== Semi-final ======
Team 1	Agg.	Team 2	1st leg	2nd leg
Vancouver Whitecaps FC (Canada)	5–1	(United States) Inter Miami CF	2–0	3–1

===== Leagues Cup =====
====== League stage ======
Pos	Team	Pld	W	PW	PL	L	GF	GA	GD	Pts	Qualification
1	Seattle Sounders FC	3	3	0	0	0	11	2	+9	9	Advance to knockout stage
2	Inter Miami CF	3	2	1	0	0	7	4	+3	8	Advance to knockout stage
3	LA Galaxy	3	2	0	1	0	10	3	+7	7	Advance to knockout stage
4	Orlando City SC	3	2	0	1	0	9	3	+6	7	Advance to knockout stage
5	Portland Timbers	3	2	0	1	0	6	1	+5	7	
6	Columbus Crew	3	2	0	1	0	6	3	+3	7	
7	Real Salt Lake	3	1	1	1	0	5	4	+1	6	
8	Los Angeles FC	3	1	1	1	0	4	3	+1	6	
9	New York Red Bulls	3	1	1	1	0	3	2	+1	6	
10	Minnesota United FC	3	1	0	1	1	7	6	+1	4	
11	FC Cincinnati	3	1	0	1	1	6	6	0	4	
12	Colorado Rapids	3	1	0	1	1	5	5	0	4	
13	Charlotte FC	3	1	0	1	1	5	6	−1	4	
14	Atlanta United FC	3	1	0	0	2	7	7	0	3	
15	San Diego FC	3	1	0	0	2	5	5	0	3	
16	New York City FC	3	1	0	0	2	3	5	−2	3	
17	CF Montréal	3	0	1	0	2	3	5	−2	2	
18	Houston Dynamo FC	3	0	0	0	3	2	8	−6	0	

Source: Leagues Cup

====== Knockout stage ======
Quarterfinals

Quarterfinals
Team 1	Score	Team 2
Inter Miami CF (United States)	2–1	(Mexico) Tigres UANL
Toluca (Mexico)	0–0 (5–6 p)	(United States) Orlando City SC
Seattle Sounders FC (United States)	0–0 (4–3 p)	(Mexico) Puebla
LA Galaxy (United States)	2–1	(Mexico) Pachuca

Semifinals

Semifinals
Team 1	Score	Team 2
Inter Miami CF (United States)	3–1	(United States) Orlando City SC
LA Galaxy (United States)	0–2	(United States) Seattle Sounders FC

Third Place playoff

The winner of the third place match will qualify for the first round of the 2026 CONCACAF Champions Cup.

Third place playoff
Team 1	Score	Team 2
LA Galaxy (United States)	2–1	(United States) Orlando City SC

Final

Both clubs that make the final will qualify for 2026 CONCACAF Champions Cup, with the winner qualify directly to the round of 16.

August 31, 2025
5:00 p.m. PDT

Seattle Sounders FC (United States)	3–0	(United States) Inter Miami CF
De Rosario 26'; A. Roldán 84' (pen.); Rothrock 89'	Report

Lumen Field, Seattle, Washington
Attendance: 69,314
Referee: Juan Gabriel Calderón (Costa Rica)

===== Campeones Cup =====
October 1, 2025
7:30 p.m. EDT (UTC−4)

LA Galaxy (United States Soccer Federation)	2–3	(Mexican Football Federation) Toluca
Fagúndez 36' (pen.); Gabriel Pec 83'	Report	Castro 53'; Romero 88'; Pereira 90+4'

Dignity Health Sports Park, Carson, California
Attendance: 16,104
Referee: Iván Barton (El Salvador)

=== Women's ===
==== League competitions ====
===== National Women's Soccer League =====
====== Regular season ======
Pos	Team	Pld	W	D	L	GF	GA	GD	Pts	Qualification
1	Kansas City Current (S)	26	21	2	3	49	13	+36	65	Playoffs and CONCACAF W Champions Cup
2	Washington Spirit	26	12	8	6	42	33	+9	44	Playoffs and CONCACAF W Champions Cup
3	Portland Thorns FC	26	11	7	8	36	29	+7	40	Playoffs
4	Orlando Pride	26	11	7	8	33	27	+6	40	Playoffs
5	Seattle Reign FC	26	10	9	7	32	29	+3	39	Playoffs
6	San Diego Wave FC	26	10	7	9	41	34	+7	37	Playoffs
7	Racing Louisville FC	26	10	7	9	35	38	−3	37	Playoffs
8	Gotham FC (C)	26	9	9	8	35	25	+10	36	Playoffs and CONCACAF W Champions Cup
9	North Carolina Courage	26	9	8	9	37	39	−2	35	
10	Houston Dash	26	8	6	12	27	39	−12	30	
11	Angel City FC	26	7	6	13	31	41	−10	27	
12	Utah Royals	26	6	7	13	28	42	−14	25	
13	Bay FC	26	4	8	14	26	41	−15	20	
14	Chicago Stars FC	26	3	11	12	32	54	−22	20	

Source: NWSL
Rules for classification: 1) points; 2) total goal difference; 3) total wins; 4) total goals scored; 5) head-to-head points; 6) head-to-head goals scored; 7) fewest disciplinary points; 8) coin toss (if 2 clubs tied) or drawing of lots (if ≥3 clubs tied).
(C) Champions; (S) NWSL Shield

====== Playoffs ======
Bracket

**Quarterfinals**
1	Kansas City Current	1
**8**	**Gotham FC (a.e.t.)**	**2**
**4**	**Orlando Pride**	**2**
5	Seattle Reign FC	0
**2**	**Washington Spirit (p)**	**1 (3)**
7	Racing Louisville FC	1 (1)
**3**	**Portland Thorns FC (a.e.t.)**	**1**
6	San Diego Wave FC	0

**Semifinals**
**8**	**Gotham FC**	**1**
4	Orlando Pride	0
**2**	**Washington Spirit**	**2**
3	Portland Thorns FC	0

**Championship**
**8**	**Gotham FC**	**1**
2	Washington Spirit	0

Championship

November 22, 2025
5:00 PST

Washington Spirit	0–1	Gotham FC
	Report	Lavelle 80'

PayPal Park, San Jose, California
Attendance: 18,000
Referee: Natalie Simon (Florida)

===== USL Super League =====
====== 2024–25 ======
Regular season

Pos	Team	Pld	W	L	T	GF	GA	GD	Pts	Qualification
1	Carolina Ascent (S)	28	13	6	9	45	24	+21	48	Playoffs
2	Tampa Bay Sun (C)	28	12	6	10	42	28	+14	46	Playoffs
3	Dallas Trinity	28	12	9	7	42	30	+12	43	Playoffs
4	Fort Lauderdale United	28	11	8	9	35	33	+2	42 (Note: Head-to-head points: Fort Lauderdale 6, Spokane 3)	Playoffs
5	Spokane Zephyr	28	11	8	9	37	32	+5	42	
6	Brooklyn	28	10	9	9	30	34	−4	39	
7	DC Power	28	5	14	9	24	41	−17	24	
8	Lexington	28	4	18	6	29	62	−33	18	

Source: USL Super League
Rules for classification: 1) head-to-head points; 2) total goal differential; 3) total goals scored; 4) disciplinary points; 5) drawing of lots.
(C) Champions; (S) Players' Shield winner
Notes:

Championship

June 14, 2025
7:30 PM EDT

Tampa Bay Sun	1–0 (a.e.t.)	Fort Lauderdale United
Fløe 100'	Report

Riverfront Stadium, Tampa, Florida
Attendance: 5,006
Referee: Danielle Chesky

====== 2025–26 ======
Regular season

Pos	Team	Pld	W	L	T	GF	GA	GD	Pts	Qualification
1	Lexington (C, S)	28	14	3	11	50	24	+26	53	Playoffs
2	Sporting JAX	28	16	7	5	54	32	+22	53	Playoffs
3	Carolina Ascent	28	15	7	6	39	27	+12	51	Playoffs
4	Dallas Trinity	28	11	10	7	36	40	−4	40	Playoffs
5	Spokane Zephyr	28	10	9	9	34	28	+6	39	
6	DC Power	28	8	11	9	34	32	+2	33	
7	Brooklyn	28	6	14	8	31	44	−13	26	
8	Tampa Bay Sun	28	5	14	9	27	46	−19	24	
9	Fort Lauderdale United	28	5	15	8	30	62	−32	23	

Updated to match(es) played on May 16, 2026. Source: Gainbridge Super League
Rules for classification: 1) head-to-head points; 2) total goal differential; 3) total goals scored; 4) disciplinary points; 5) drawing of lots.
(C) Champions; (S) Players' Shield winner

==== Cup competitions ====
===== NWSL Challenge Cup =====
March 7, 2025
8:00 pm EDT

Orlando Pride	1–1	Washington Spirit
Souza 41'	Report	Santos 72'
Penalties
Doyle (penalty scored); Angelina (penalty scored); Yates (penalty missed); Lemos (penalty missed)	2–4	(penalty scored) Hatch; (penalty scored) Bernal; (penalty scored) Miura; (penalty scored) McKeown

Inter&Co Stadium, Orlando, Florida
Attendance: 8,880
Referee: Alex Billeter

==== International competitions ====
===== 2024–25 CONCACAF W Championship Cup =====
Group

Pos	Team	Pld	W	D	L	GF	GA	GD	Pts	Qualification	TUA	NYJ	MON	LDA	FRA
1	(Mexico) Tigres UANL	4	3	1	0	18	6	+12	**10**	Advance to knockout stage	—	—	4–0	3–1	—
2	(United States) NJ/NY Gotham	4	2	2	0	21	4	+17	**8**	Advance to knockout stage	4–4	—	0–0	—	—
3	(Mexico) Monterrey	4	2	1	1	8	4	+4	**7**		—	—	—	3–0	5–0
4	(Costa Rica) Alajuelense	4	1	0	3	6	10	−4	**3**		—	0–4	—	—	5–0
5	(Jamaica) Frazsiers Whip	4	0	0	4	1	30	−29	**0**		1–7	0–13	—	—	—

Source: CONCACAF
Rules for classification: Tiebreakers

Pos	Team	Pld	W	D	L	GF	GA	GD	Pts	Qualification	AME	POR	SDW	WFC	SFE
1	(Mexico) América	4	3	0	1	14	3	+11	**9**	Advance to knockout stage	—	—	—	7–0	5–0
2	(United States) Portland Thorns	4	3	0	1	13	5	+8	**9**	Advance to knockout stage	3–1	—	—	—	2–1
3	(United States) San Diego Wave	4	3	0	1	7	3	+4	**9**		0–1	3–2	—	—	—
4	(Canada) Whitecaps Girls Elite	4	1	0	3	2	16	−14	**3**		—	0–6	0–2	—	—
5	(Panama) Santa Fe	4	0	0	4	2	11	−9	**0**		—	—	0–2	1–2	—

Source: CONCACAF
Rules for classification: Tiebreakers

Knockout stage
Semi-finals

Team 1	Score	Team 2
América (Mexico)	1–3	(United States) Gotham FC
UANL (Mexico)	2–0	(United States) Portland Thorns FC

Final

24 May 2025
21:00 CT

Tigres UANL (Mexico)	0–1	(United States) Gotham FC
	Report	González 82'

Estadio Universitario, San Nicolás de los Garza
Referee: Marianela Araya (Costa Rica)

===== 2025–26 CONCACAF W Championship Cup =====
Group

Pos	Team	Pld	W	D	L	GF	GA	GD	Pts	Qualification	AME	PAC	ORL	ALA	CHO
1	(Mexico) América	4	3	1	0	12	0	+12	**10**	Advance to knockout stage	—	1–0	2–0	—	—
2	(Mexico) Pachuca	4	2	1	1	12	2	+10	**7**	Advance to knockout stage	—	—	—	5–0	6–0
3	(United States) Orlando Pride	4	2	1	1	9	3	+6	**7**		—	1–1	—	3–0	—
4	(Costa Rica) Alajuelense	4	1	1	2	1	8	−7	**4**		0–0	—	—	—	1–0
5	(Panama) Chorrillo	4	0	0	4	0	21	−21	**0**		0–9	—	0–5	—	—

Source: CONCACAF
Rules for classification: Tiebreakers

Pos	Team	Pld	W	D	L	GF	GA	GD	Pts	Qualification	WAS	GFC	MON	VNR	ALI
1	(United States) Washington Spirit	4	3	1	0	15	0	+15	**10**	Advance to knockout stage	—	—	4–0	4–0	—
2	(United States) Gotham FC	4	3	1	0	8	2	+6	**10**	Advance to knockout stage	0–0	—	2–1	—	—
3	(Mexico) Monterrey	4	2	0	2	13	6	+7	**6**		—	—	—	4–0	8–0
4	(Canada) Vancouver Rise Academy	4	1	0	3	9	12	−3	**3**		—	1–4	—	—	8–0
5	(El Salvador) Alianza	4	0	0	4	0	25	−25	**0**		0–7	0–2	—	—	—

Source: CONCACAF
Rules for classification: Tiebreakers

== Honors ==
=== Professional ===
Men
Competition		Winner
U.S. Open Cup		Nashville SC
MLS Supporters' Shield		Philadelphia Union
MLS Cup		Inter Miami CF
Leagues Cup		Seattle Sounders FC
USL Championship	Players' Shield	Louisville City FC
USL Championship	Playoffs	Pittsburgh Riverhounds SC
MLS Next Pro	Regular season	St. Louis City 2
MLS Next Pro	Playoffs	New York Red Bulls II
USL League One	Players' Shield	One Knoxville SC
USL League One	Playoffs	One Knoxville SC
USL Jägermeister Cup		Hartford Athletic

Women
Competition		Winner
NWSL Challenge Cup		Washington Spirit
National Women's Soccer League		Gotham FC
NWSL Shield		Kansas City Current
USL Super League	Regular season	Carolina Ascent FC
USL Super League	Playoffs	Tampa Bay Sun FC

=== Amateur ===
Men
Competition	Team
USL League Two	Vermont Green
National Premier Soccer League	Hickory FC
The League for Clubs	Metropolitan Oval Academy
National Amateur Cup	West Chester United SC
NCAA Division I Soccer Championship	University of Washington
NCAA Division II Soccer Championship	Midwestern State
NCAA Division III Soccer Championship	Tufts University
NAIA Soccer Championship	Grand View (Iowa)

Women
Competition	Team
United Women's Soccer	Edgewater Castle FC
USL W League	Utah United
Women's Premier Soccer League	Sporting CT
National Amateur Cup	Pan World Elite
NCAA Division I Soccer Championship	Florida State
NCAA Division II Soccer Championship	Florida Tech
NCAA Division III Soccer Championship	Washington University
NAIA Soccer Championship	Keiser University (FL)
