= Alejandro López =

Alejandro López may refer to:

- Alejandro López de Haro (1949–2010), Venezuelan photographer and stockbroker
- Alejandro López (footballer, born 1989), Argentine football defender
- Alejandro López (footballer, born 2009), Dominican football defender
- Alejandro López (racewalker) (born 1975), Mexican racewalker
- Alejandro López (politician), Argentine politician
- Álex López (footballer, born 1988), Spanish football midfielder
- Álex López (footballer, born 1993), Spanish football striker
- Álex López (footballer, born 1997), Spanish football midfielder

== See also ==
- Alex Lopez (disambiguation)
- Alejandra López Noriega (born 1970), Mexican politician
- Alexandra López (born 1989), Spanish football defender
- Alexander López (born 1992), Honduran football attacking midfielder
