= Marlon Meza Jr. =

Belizean footballer (born 2009)

Personal information
- Full name: Marlon Gael Meza Jr.
- Date of birth: 26 March 2009 (age 17)
- Place of birth: Santa Elena, Belize
- Position: Midfielder

Team information
- Current team: Mount Pleasant

Youth career
- 2022–2025: Westline
- 2025–: Mount Pleasant

International career^{‡}
Years	Team	Apps	(Gls)
2025–	Belize	3	(2)
- ‡ National team caps and goals as of 13:57, 19 November 2025 (UTC)

Marlon Gael Meza Jr. (born 26 March 2009) is a Belizean association footballer who currently plays for the academy of Jamaica Premier League club Mount Pleasant and the Belize national team.

== Club career ==
As a youth, Meza was part of the regional team representing Cayo District in the Football Federation of Belize National U13 Boys Elite Championship. He scored two goals against the team from Stann Creek to advance to the final. Despite scoring both of his team's goals, Cayo were defeated 5–2 in the final by Belize District. Meza finished the tournament as top scorer and was named the Best Forward in the competition. In 2024, Meza and his club, Westline FC, won the national under-15 championship with a 3–2 victory over the academy of Premier League of Belize club Progresso FC.

In March 2025, it was reported that Meza was being scouted by clubs outside of Belize, including teams from the United States, Honduras, and Spain. The following month, it was announced that he had joined the academy of Jamaica Premier League club Mount Pleasant F.A. on a full scholarship. Meza was invited for a two-week trial with Sporting Braga of Portugal's Primeira Liga in March 2026.

== International career ==
In February 2024, Meza was part of the Belize U16 team that competed in the UEFA U16 Youth Tournament in Tirana, Albania. Following a 1–1 score at the end of regulation, Belize defeated San Marino in the penalty shoot-out for the nation's Belize's first-ever win over a European opponent. Meza was then included in Belize's squad for 2025 CONCACAF U-17 World Cup qualification. His performances included a brace in a 7–0 victory over Dominica and two more goals in a narrow defeat to Barbados. He was described by CONCACAF journalists as a pivotal part of the Belize offense as the team's top scorer.

In March 2025, Meza was called up to the senior national team for the first time for two 2025 CONCACAF Gold Cup qualification matches against Costa Rica. He made his senior debut on 21 March 2025 in the first match, coming on for the final fifteen minutes, at age fifteen. He was called up again the following June for 2026 FIFA World Cup qualification matches against Montserrat and Panama. In preparation for the matches, Belize played a friendly against club team CD Aragon from Oaxaca, Mexico. Meza entered the match as a substitute in the eventual 1–1 draw.

Meza was part of Belize's starting eleven for the first time for a 2025–26 CONCACAF Series match against Saint Kitts and Nevis on 18 November 2025. In the match, he scored his first two international goals, becoming one of Belize's all-time youngest goalscorers at age sixteen. Belize went on to win the match 6–2.

=== International goals ===
Scores and results list the Belize's goal tally first.

No.	Date	Venue	Opponent	Score	Result	Competition
1	18 November 2025	SKNFA Technical Center, Basseterre, Saint Kitts and Nevis	Saint Kitts and Nevis	4–1	6–2	2025–26 CONCACAF Series
2	18 November 2025	SKNFA Technical Center, Basseterre, Saint Kitts and Nevis	Saint Kitts and Nevis	5–1	6–2	2025–26 CONCACAF Series
Last updated 19 November 2025

=== International career statistics ===
As of match played 18 November 2025.

Belize national team
2025	3	2
Total	3	2

== Personal ==
Meza is the son of former Belize international footballer Marlon Meza. Both players hail from the town of Santa Elena. Meza Jr. attended Saint Ignatius High School in his hometown.
