= Alex Lopez =

Alex Lopez may refer to:

- Álex López Morón (born 1970), Spanish tennis player
- Alex Lopez (swimmer) (born 1979), Puerto Rican swimmer
- Alex Lopez (actress) (born 1980), Nigerian actress
- Alex Lopez (born 1985), Mexican drummer for Suicide Silence
- Álex López (footballer, born 1988), Spanish football midfielder
- Alex López (footballer, born 1992), Honduran football attacking midfielder
- Álex López (footballer, born 1993), Spanish football striker
- Álex López (footballer, born 1997), Spanish football midfielder
- Álex López (footballer, born 2005), Spanish football defender
- Alex Lopez (politician), Filipino politician

== See also ==
- Alejandro López (disambiguation)
- Ale López (born 1989), Spanish women's football defender
