= José Mancilla =

Mexican footballer (born 2008)

Personal information
- Full name: José Humberto Mancilla López
- Date of birth: 3 June 2008 (age 18)
- Place of birth: Río Bravo, Tamaulipas, Mexico
- Height: 1.73 m (5 ft 8 in)
- Position: Midfielder

Team information
- Current team: UNAM
- Number: 243

Youth career
- UNAM

International career^{‡}
Years	Team	Apps	(Gls)
2024–	Mexico U17	8	(2)
- ‡ National team caps and goals as of 7 September 2025

José Humberto Mancilla López (born 3 June 2008) is a Mexican professional footballer who plays as a midfielder for Liga MX club Pumas.

== Club career ==
As a youth player, Mancilla joined the youth academy of Pumas and helped the club's under-17 team win the league title.

== International career ==
Mancilla is a Mexico youth international. During February 2025, he played for the Mexico national under-17 football team for 2025 CONCACAF U-17 World Cup qualification.

== Style of play ==
Mancilla plays as a midfielder. English newspaper The Guardian wrote in 2025 that he is a "versatile and technically gifted left-footer, he is a box-to-box midfielder and one of Mexico’s most promising players".
