= Brandon Ramírez =

Salvadoran footballer

Personal information
- Full name: Brandon Stanley Ramírez García
- Date of birth: 5 September 2008 (age 18)
- Place of birth: El Salvador
- Height: 1.73 m (5 ft 8 in)
- Position: Forward

Team information
- Current team: Juventud Independiente

Youth career
- 2021–2025: Turín FESA

Senior career*
Years	Team	Apps	(Gls)
2025-	Juventud Independiente		

International career^{‡}
2025	El Salvador U-17	9	(3)
2025–	El Salvador U-20		
2025–	El Salvador	1	(1)
- * Club domestic league appearances and goals as of 15:53, 9 September 2024 (UTC) ‡ National team caps and goals as of 15:53, 9 September 2024 (UTC)

Brandon Ramírez (born 5 September 2008) is a Salvadoran professional footballer who plays as a forward for Turín FESA and the El Salvador national team.

== Club career ==
As a youth, Ramírez began participating in local tournaments at age ten or twelve. While competing in a tournament in Quezaltepeque, a teammate's father suggested that he try out for Turín FESA. He did so and joined the club on scholarship in November 2021. Following his standout performances with the national teams in 2025, Ramírez was hoping to join a club in the Primera División.

== International career ==
Ramírez represented El Salvador at the youth level in 2025 CONCACAF U-17 World Cup qualification. He scored in his nation's 8–0 victory over the Cayman Islands to open the qualifying campaign. In the final match, Ramírez scored the game-winning goal against Jamaica to win the group and qualify for the 2025 FIFA U-17 World Cup in Qatar. It was the first time that El Salvador qualified for the FIFA U-17 World Cup.

In May 2025, Ramírez was called up to the senior national team for the first time for a friendly against Guatemala. He scored in the 89th minute to level the score and secure the draw after entering the match as a second-half substitute for Emerson Mauricio. With the appearance and goal, he became both the youngest-ever debutante and goal scorer for El Salvador's senior national team at sixteen years and eight months old.

== Career statistics ==
=== International goals ===
Scores and results list El Salvador's goal tally first.

No.	Date	Venue	Opponent	Score	Result	Competition
1.	31 May 2025	Finley Stadium, Chattanooga, United States	Guatemala	1–1	1–1	Friendly
Last updated 17 June 2025

=== International career statistics ===
As of match played 31 May 2025.

El Salvador national team
Year	Apps	Goals
2025	1	1
Total	1	1
