= Toryn Penders =

U.S. Virgin Islands association footballer

Personal information
- Date of birth: March 3, 2008 (age 18)
- Place of birth: Durham, North Carolina, United States
- Height: 1.82 m (6 ft 0 in)
- Position: Forward

Team information
- Current team: Northwestern Wildcats
- Number: 15

Youth career
- 2021–2023: North Carolina FC
- 2023–2025: Triangle United
- 2025–2026: Orlando City

College career
| Years | Team | Apps | (Gls) |
| 2026– | Northwestern Wildcats | 0 | (0) |

Senior career*
| Years | Team | Apps | (Gls) |
| 2026 | Orlando City B | 2 | (0) |
| 2026 | North Carolina FC U23 | 1 | (0) |

International career^{‡}
| 2026– | United States Virgin Islands | 2 | (2) |
- * Club domestic league appearances and goals as of 19:27, 11 August 2026 (UTC) ‡ National team caps and goals as of 19:27, 11 August 2026 (UTC)

Toryn Penders (born March 3, 2008) is a United States Virgin Islands soccer player who plays as a forward for the Northwestern Wildcats and the United States Virgin Islands national team.

== Club career ==
As a youth, Penders played for local club Triangle United of MLS Next. He was spotted by Major League Soccer club Orlando City SC and joined the club's academy in August 2025. In January 2026, it was announced that Penders had committed to playing college soccer in the United States for the Wildcats of Northwestern University in the NCAA Division I.

Penders made his professional debut playing for Orlando City B in the MLS Next Pro on August 19, 2026, coming on as a second-half substitute against Carolina Core FC. With the score level at 2–2 at the end of regulation time, the match was decided by a penalty shoot-out with Penders converting his attempt. Later that summer, he made one appearance for North Carolina FC U23 in the USL League Two.

== International career ==
Penders represented the United States Virgin Islands at the youth level in 2025 CONCACAF U-17 World Cup qualification. He scored in the team's 3–6 defeat to Cuba. In total, he appeared in all three of the USVI's qualification matches, scoring one goal. In February 2026, he was then named to the national under-20 squad for 2026 CONCACAF U-20 Championship qualifying.

Penders made his senior international debut on March 25, 2026 in a 2026 FIFA Series match against American Samoa. He would go on to score his first two senior international goals in the eventual 5–2 victory.

=== International goals ===
Scores and results list the United States Virgin Islands' goal tally first.

| No. | Date | Venue | Opponent | Score | Result | Competition |
|---|---|---|---|---|---|---|
| 1 | March 25, 2026 | Juan Ramón Loubriel Stadium, Bayamón, Puerto Rico | American Samoa | 2–0 | 5–2 | 2026 FIFA Series |
| 2 | March 25, 2026 | Juan Ramón Loubriel Stadium, Bayamón, Puerto Rico | American Samoa | 3–0 | 5–2 | 2026 FIFA Series |
Last updated 11 August 2026

=== International career statistics ===
As of match played 28 March 2026.

United States Virgin Islands
| 2026 | 2 | 2 |
| Total | 2 | 2 |
