= Alejandro López de Haro =

Alejandro López de Haro Ramirez
- Born: January 8, 1949
- Died: May 24, 2010 (aged 61)
- Education: Bachelor of Science in business from Bryant College and an MBA in Finance from New York University
- Known for: art photography
- Notable work: the book of photographs and poems "Los Crepúsculos de la Imaginación", the book "Apuntes de la India"

Alejandro López de Haro Ramirez (January 8, 1949 – May 24, 2010) was a Venezuelan photographer, writer and stockbroker.

== Biography ==
He held a Bachelor of Science in business from Bryant College and an MBA in Finance from New York University.

After founding and managing Bancalf, an investment bank and brokerage house, in Caracas, Venezuela for twenty years López de Haro eventually sold his company and retired to Paris, France and Madrid, Spain. Here he dedicated most of his time to photography and writing. His writings have been published in Analitica Venezuela and the topics usually had to do with the arts and politics. In 1997, he was admitted into the British Institute of Professional Photography until he decided to dedicate himself to art photography rather than more commercial photography. López de Haro worked mostly with platinum prints. In November 2005 his first book of photographs and poems Los Crepúsculos de la Imaginación was published by Lodima Press. Notable buyers of the book have included the Maison Européenne de la Photographie and Karl Lagerfeld's art bookshop Librairie 7L in Paris.

Los Crepúsculos de la Imaginación was included in the list of 100 best photography books by PHOTOESPAÑA 2008. López de Haro's photographs were exhibited at the National Library of Spain. His photographs have been exhibited in Paris, Los Angeles and Madrid.

His second book, Apuntes de la India, a collection of photographs and essays was published in February 2014 by delCentro Editores in Madrid, Spain.

His father was Venezuelan businessman Antonio López Fajardo.
