= Kevin Khan =

Canadian soccer player (born 2008)

Personal information
- Date of birth: May 30, 2008 (age 18)
- Place of birth: Toronto, Ontario, Canada
- Height: 1.70 m (5 ft 7 in)
- Position: Midfielder

Team information
- Current team: Feyenoord U21

Youth career
- Brampton YSC
- 2016–2021: Dutch Connections FC
- 2021–: Feyenoord

International career^{‡}
Years	Team	Apps	(Gls)
2023	Canada U15	4	(1)
2025	Canada U17	13	(6)
2026–	Canada	1	(0)
- ‡ National team caps and goals as of November 16, 2026

Kevin Khan (born May 30, 2008) is a Canadian soccer player who plays for Feyenoord U21 and the Canada national team.

== Early life ==
Khan began playing youth soccer with Brampton YSC at age four. He later played with Dutch Connections FC, before moving to the Netherlands and joining the Feyenoord Academy in 2021. He was named Feyenoord's Academy Player of the Month for April 2023. In August 2024, at age 16, Khan signed a three-year professional contract with Feyenoord, but continued to play with the youth teams.

== International career ==
In 2023, Khan played for the Canada U15 team at the 2023 CONCACAF Boys' Under-15 Championship.

In 2025, Khan played for the Canada U17 team at the 2025 CONCACAF U-17 World Cup qualification tournament, where he was named to the tournament's Best XI. He later was named to the squad for the 2025 FIFA U-17 World Cup. He scored six goals in 13 appearances with the U17s.

In November 2026, Khan was called up to the Canada senior team for the first time for the 2026–27 CONCACAF Nations League A quarterfinals against Guatemala, while having yet to make his professional debut at club level. On November 16, 2026, he made his debut, in a substitute appearance against Guatemala.
