= Evens Julmis =

Bahamian football referee

- Born: 1999 or 2000 (age 26–27); Nassau, Bahamas
- Other occupation: Soccer and beach soccer player

Domestic
Years	League	Role
??–present	BFA Senior League	Referee

International
Years	League	Role
2025–	FIFA listed	Referee
2022–present	CONCACAF	Referee

Evens Julmis (born 1999 or 2000) is a Bahamian football referee who is the only FIFA-listed referee from The Bahamas as of 2025.

== Career ==
Julmis began his refereeing career in 2017, while still attending CR Walker High School in Nassau. He played for a local school team at the competitions organized by the Government Secondary Schools Sports Association, and was also a member of the Nassau-based soccer team Dynamos FC. By the age of 22 in May 2022, Julmis got his first CONCACAF appointment when he was selected as a fourth official for the 2022–23 CONCACAF Nations League B game between Haiti and Bermuda, played on 4 June 2022 at the Bermuda National Stadium in Devonshire Parish.

FIFA listed Julmis in its 2025 roster, with Julmis being the only Bahamian central referee at the level. In January 2025, he was selected for a training program and seminar in Costa Rica, as part of CONCACAF requirements for further tournaments, including the CONCACAF Gold Cup and the CONCACAF Champions Cup. After the seminar, Julmis was appointed to referee matches at the CONCACAF U-17 World Cup qualification, including a match between Saint Kitts and Nevis U-17 and the United States U-17 in Costa Rica.

Prior to becoming a professional referee, Julmis was part of the Bahamian national team, as well as part of the beach soccer squad.
