= Ramiz Hamouda =

American soccer player (born 2008)

Personal information
- Full name: Ramiz Khalil Hamouda
- Date of birth: May 26, 2008 (age 18)
- Place of birth: Lincoln, Nebraska, United States
- Height: 1.88 m (6 ft 2 in)
- Position: Defender

Team information
- Current team: Werder Bremen II
- Number: 25

Youth career
- 2020–2024: Sporting Kansas City

Senior career*
Years	Team	Apps	(Gls)
2024–2026	Birmingham Legion	38	(0)
2026–	Werder Bremen II	5	(0)

International career^{‡}
2023	United States U15	6	(0)
2024	United States U16	1	(0)
2025–	United States U17	2	(1)
- * Club domestic league appearances and goals as of September 22, 2026 ‡ National team caps and goals as of February 16, 2025

Ramiz Hamouda (born May 26, 2008) is an American soccer player who plays as a defender for Werder Bremen II in Regionalliga Nord.

== Early life ==
Hamouda was born on May 26, 2008, in the United States. A native of Lincoln, Nebraska, United States, he is of Sudanese descent through his parents.

== Club career ==
As a youth player, Hamouda joined the youth academy of Sporting Kansas City. In 2024, he signed for Birmingham Legion FC, after having been linked with German club Werder Bremen. On April 18, 2024, he debuted for the club during a 4–2 extra time home win over Chattanooga Red Wolves SC in the US Open Cup.

In January 2026 Bundesliga club Werder Bremen confirmed that Hamouda would join the club in the summer, being assigned to the club's reserve team.,

== International career ==
Hamouda is a United States youth international. During February 2025, he played for the United States men's national under-17 soccer team for 2025 CONCACAF U-17 World Cup qualification.

== Style of play ==
Hamouda plays as a defender. Left-footed, he is known for his speed and in-game intelligence.
