= Claudio de Oliveira =

Guatemalan footballer (born 2008)

Personal information
- Full name: Claudio Andrés de Oliveira Maldonado
- Date of birth: 8 December 2008 (age 17)
- Place of birth: Quetzaltenango, Guatemala
- Height: 1.82 m (6 ft 0 in)
- Position: Winger

Team information
- Current team: Xelajú
- Number: 26

Youth career
- Escuela Brasileña de Fútbol
- –2024: Xelajú

Senior career*
Years	Team	Apps	(Gls)
2024–	Xelajú	12	(0)

International career^{‡}
2024–	Guatemala U17	7	(2)
- * Club domestic league appearances and goals as of 14 December 2024 ‡ National team caps and goals as of 23 January 2025

Claudio Andrés de Oliveira Maldonado (born 8 December 2008) is a Guatemalan footballer who plays as a winger for Xelajú.

== Early life ==
De Oliveira was born on 8 December 2008 in Quetzaltenango, Guatemala and is the son of Brazilian footballer Luiz Claudio de Oliveira. A native of Quetzaltenango, Guatemala, he attended Colegio John Harvard in Guatemala.

== Club career ==
As a youth player, de Oliveira joined the Escuela Brasileña de Fútbol. Subsequently, he joined the youth academy of Xelajú and was promoted to the club's first team in 2024. On 4 August 2024, he debuted for them during a 3-1 win over Marquense. During his first season with them, he helped them win the Apertura league title.
