= Jude Terry (soccer) =

American soccer player (born 2008)

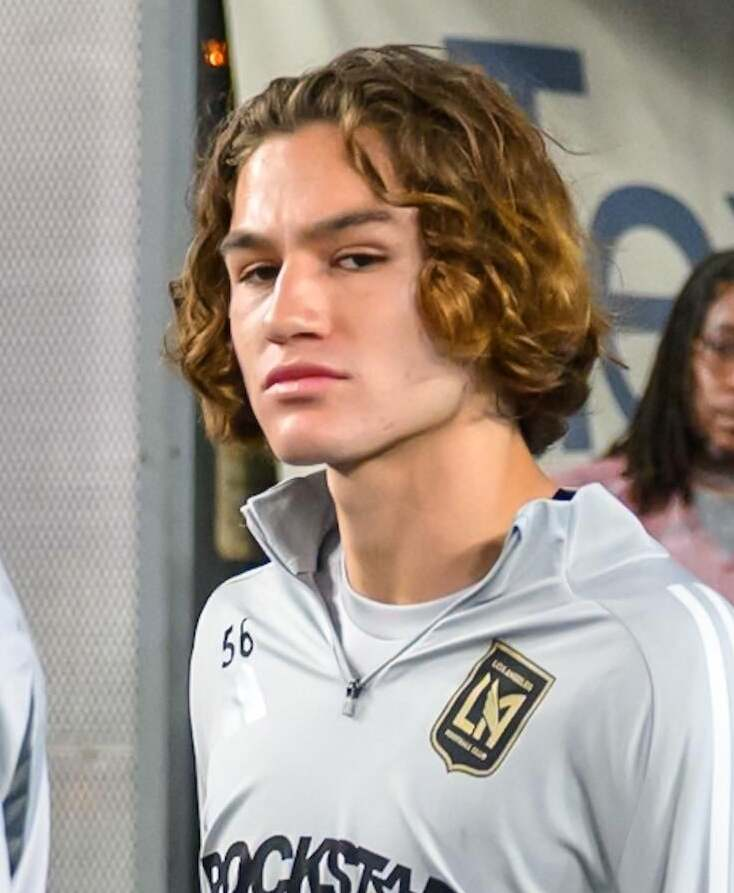
- Terry with Los Angeles FC in 2025

Personal information
- Full name: Jude Terry
- Date of birth: October 8, 2008 (age 18)
- Place of birth: Chula Vista, California, U.S.
- Height: 1.75 m (5 ft 9 in)
- Position: Midfielder

Team information
- Current team: Los Angeles FC
- Number: 22

Youth career
- –2021: Legends FC
- 2021–2024: Los Angeles FC

Senior career*
Years	Team	Apps	(Gls)
2024–	Los Angeles FC 2	44	(3)
2025–	Los Angeles FC	12	(2)

International career^{‡}
2023	United States U15	9	(1)
2024–	United States U17	9	(3)
- * Club domestic league appearances and goals as of October 21, 2026 ‡ National team caps and goals as of October 21, 2026

Jude Terry (born October 8, 2008) is an American professional soccer player who plays as a midfielder for Major League Soccer club Los Angeles FC.

== Early life ==
Terry was born on October 8, 2008. Born in Chula Vista, California, United States, he is a native of the city. He is of Argentine descent through his father, who is partly of English descent, and Mexican descent through his maternal grandparents.

== Club career ==
As a youth player, Terry joined the youth academy of Legends FC. Following his stint there, he joined the youth academy of Los Angeles FC at the age of twelve and was promoted to the club's senior team in 2025.

== International career ==
Terry is a United States youth international. During February 2025, he played for the United States men's national under-17 soccer team for 2025 CONCACAF U-17 World Cup qualification. English newspaper The Guardian wrote in 2025 that he "is widely considered to be one of the finest talents in the US pipeline".
