= Analítica =

Venezuelan media company

- Publisher: Analitica Consulting
- Country: Venezuela
- Based in: Caracas
- Language: Spanish
- Website: http://www.analitica.com
- OCLC: 173640704

Analítica is a Venezuelan news website that reports on political, economic, and international events. It was founded in 1996 as an online opinion publication and became a digital news outlet in 2014.

At present, it is a company specializing in the publication of opinion and analysis articles on current issues in the political, economic, social, global, environmental, scientific, artistic, entertainment and business fields.
