= Luis Suazo =

Honduran footballer (born 2008)

Personal information
- Full name: Luis Gabriel Suazo Secchi
- Date of birth: 30 June 2008 (age 18)
- Place of birth: Cagliari, Italy
- Position: Winger

Team information
- Current team: Braga

Youth career
- Cagliari
- 2022–2025: Juventus
- 2025–: Braga

International career
Years	Team	Apps	(Gls)
2025–	Honduras U17	3	(3)

Luis Gabriel Suazo Secchi (born 30 June 2008) is a professional footballer who plays as a winger for Portuguese club Braga. Born in Italy, he is a youth international for Honduras.

== Early life ==
Suazo was born in Cagliari, Italy to former Honduran international footballer David Suazo and an Italian mother.

== Club career ==
As a child, Suazo joined his father's former club, Cagliari, and was already representing the club in international tournaments at the age of nine. In September 2022, he moved to Serie A club Juventus.

In July 2025 he moved to Portuguese club Braga. In doing so, he became the first Honduran to sign for the club. In October 2025, he was named by English newspaper The Guardian as one of the best players born in 2008 worldwide.

== International career ==
Eligible to represent both Italy and Honduras at international level, Suazo was called up to the Honduran under-17 side in early 2025, ahead of qualification games for the 2025 FIFA U-17 World Cup. He scored a hat-trick in Honduras' 8–0 win against Bonaire on 12 February 2025.
