= Estevis López =

Panamanian association football player (born 2009)

Personal information
- Full name: Estevis Jhassir López Senhouse
- Date of birth: 22 October 2009 (age 17)
- Place of birth: Panama City, Panama
- Height: 1.68 m (5 ft 6 in)
- Positions: Midfielder; forward

Team information
- Current team: Veraguas United (on loan from Academia Costa del Este)
- Number: 23

Youth career
- 2024–2026: Academia Costa del Este
- 2024–2025: → River Plate (loan)

Senior career*
| Years | Team | Apps | (Gls) |
| 2026– | Academia Costa Del Este | 0 | (0) |
| 2026– | → Veraguas United (loan) | 21 | (3) |

International career^{‡}
| 2025– | Panama U17 | 8 | (5) |
| 2025– | Panama U20 | 3 | (1) |
- * Club domestic league appearances and goals as of 4 October 2026 ‡ National team caps and goals as of 27 September 2026

Estevis Jhassir López Senhouse (born 22 October 2009) is a Panamanian professional footballer who plays as a forward or midfielder for Liga LPF team Veraguas United, on loan from Academia Costa del Este, and the Panama national under-20 football team.

== Youth career ==
López began his career at Academia Costa del Este, a prominent football academy and professional development club based in the Costa del Este neighbourhood of Panama City, Panama, before moving on loan to the Juveniles of Argentine giants River Plate for two seasons.

== Club career ==
López made his senior debut on loan at Liga LPF side Veraguas United, in a 2–2 league draw against Union Cocle. López scored his first senior goal for Veraguas in a 3–2 victory over Sporting San Miguelito in March 2026. During his time at Veraguas, López would attract interest from several top footballing leagues, such as Belgium, Portugal and Colombia, before being invited to join the FC Bayern Munich World Squad in June 2026.

== International career ==
López was part of the Panama U17 side that qualified for the 2025 FIFA U-17 World Cup, contributing 3 goals in 3 games in qualifying, before playing all 3 games in the tournament proper as the team was eliminated in the group stage.

== Career statistics ==
As of match played 4 October 2026

Appearances and goals by club, season and competition
| Club | Season | League | | | National cup | | Continental | | Other | | Total | |
| Club | Season | Division | Apps | Goals | Apps | Goals | Apps | Goals | Apps | Goals | Apps | Goals |
|---|---|---|---|---|---|---|---|---|---|---|---|---|
| Veraguas United (loan) | 2026 | Liga Panameña de Fútbol | 21 | 3 | — | | — | | — | | 21 | 3 |
| Career total | | | 21 | 3 | 0 | 0 | 0 | 0 | 0 | 0 | 21 | 3 |
