= Logan Jiménez =

Bermudian footballer

Personal information
- Full name: Logan Ian Clarke Jiménez
- Date of birth: 15 May 2008 (age 18)
- Place of birth: Bermuda
- Height: 1.78 m (5 ft 10 in)
- Positions: Forward; midfielder

Team information
- Current team: Hibernian
- Number: 11

Youth career
- 2013–2019: BAA Wanderers
- 2019–2020: Somerset Trojans
- 2020–: Hibernian

International career^{‡}
Years	Team	Apps	(Gls)
2025–	Bermuda	2	(0)
- ‡ National team caps and goals as of 19:31, 4 March 2026 (UTC)

Logan Jiménez (born 15 May 2008) is a Bermudian footballer who plays for the academy of Scottish Premiership club Hibernian and the Bermuda national team.

== Club career ==
Jiménez began his career at age five with BAA Wanderers. He would eventually captain the under-9 squad and was named the club's Player of the Season multiple times. In 2019, he joined the under-11 side of Bermudian Premier Division club Somerset Trojans. He was named team MVP following his first season with the club.

While playing in Bermuda, he drew the attention of scouts from Scottish Premiership club Hibernian. Following a trial with the club, Jiménez joined Hibernian at the age of twelve. After leading the team to a CAS Elite Under-18 League championship, he signed his first professional contract with the club in March 2025 with the initial deal extending through 30 June 2026. As under-18 league champion with Hibernian, Jiménez experienced his first international club football later that year as the team was set to open its 2025–26 UEFA Youth League campaign against FC 2 Korriku of Kosovo. He appeared in the match, an eventual 4–0 victory, also marking the first time the player played a match at Easter Road.

== International career ==
Jiménez holds dual Bermudian and British citizenship through his Scottish mother and Bermudian father. As a youth, he represented Bermuda as the captain of the national under-17 team in 2026 CONCACAF U-17 World Cup qualification. He scored in the team's 3–1 victory over Anguilla.

As a student at St David's Roman Catholic High School, he later also represented Scotland with the Scottish Schools’ Under-18 team against its counterparts from England and Australia in the 2025 Centenary Shield. He debuted in Scotland's opening match, a 1–1 draw with Australia. He then appeared against England, coming on as a second-half substitute of the eventual 6–2 victory.

At age seventeen, Jiménez received his first senior call-up to the Bermuda national team for 2026 FIFA World Cup qualification matches against Curaçao and Trinidad and Tobago in November 2025. He made his debut on 13 November in the match against Curaçao, starting and playing the full contest.

In early 2026, Jiménez captained the Bermuda U20 team in 2026 CONCACAF U-20 Championship qualifying. Bermuda would finish the qualifying campaign undefeated. However, the territory missed out on qualification to the final tournament on goal difference.

=== International career statistics ===
As of match played 13 November 2025

Bermuda
Year	Apps	Goals
2025	2	0
Total	2	0
