= Tanner Rosborough =

American footballer (born 2008)

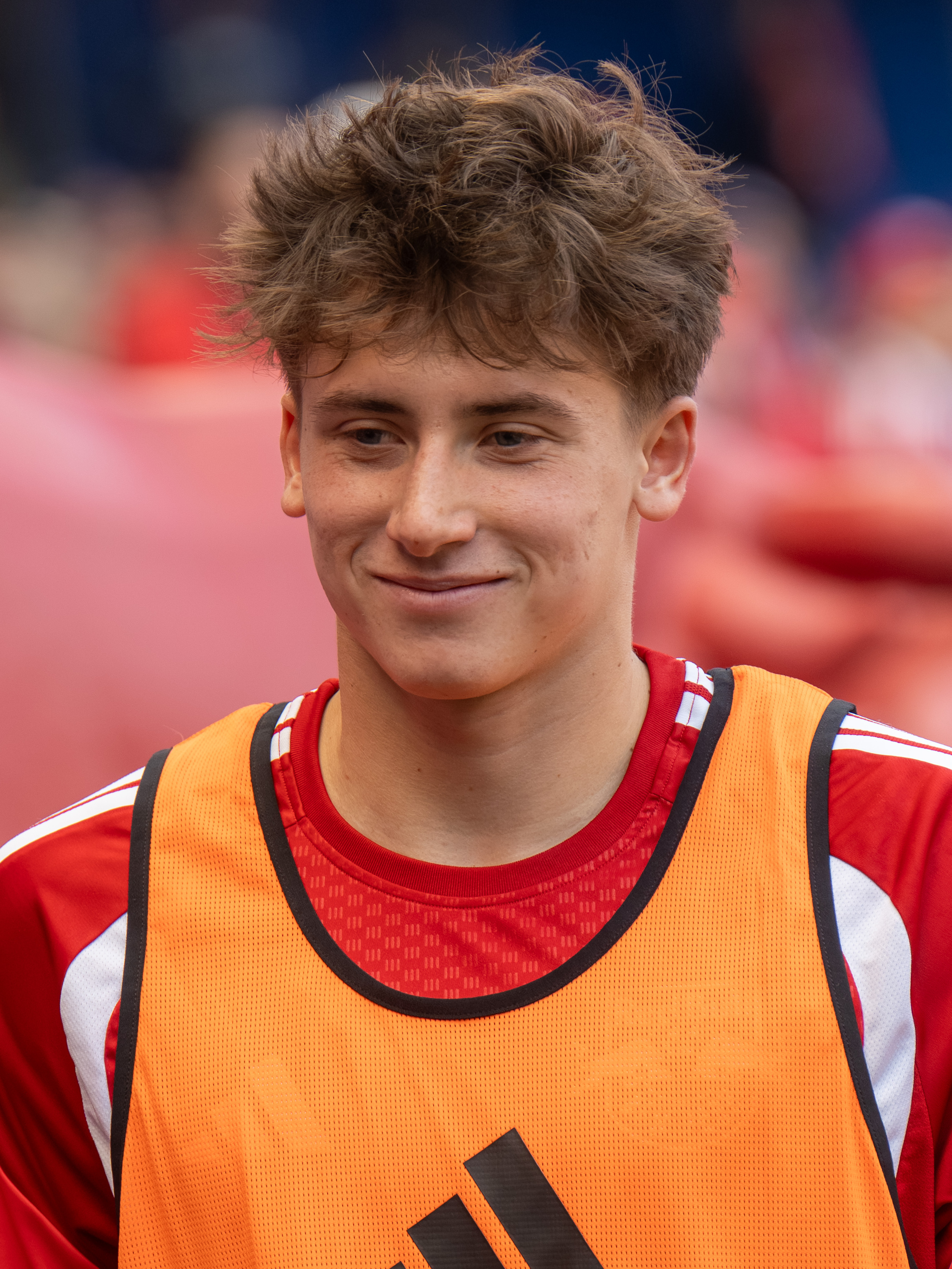
- Rosborough with the New York Red Bulls in 2026

Personal information
- Date of birth: March 21, 2008 (age 18)
- Place of birth: Pittsburgh, Pennsylvania, U.S.
- Height: 1.83 m (6 ft 0 in)
- Position: Forward

Team information
- Current team: New York Red Bulls
- Number: 66

Youth career
- 2012–2022: Beadling Soccer Club
- 2022–2025: New York Red Bulls

Senior career*
| Years | Team | Apps | (Gls) |
| 2023– | New York Red Bulls II | 45 | (15) |
| 2025– | New York Red Bulls | 5 | (0) |

International career^{‡}
| 2023 | United States U15 | 6 | (2) |
| 2023 | United States U16 | 2 | (0) |
| 2025– | United States U17 | 6 | (5) |
- * Club domestic league appearances and goals as of November 15, 2026 ‡ National team caps and goals as of August 18, 2025

Tanner Rosborough (born March 21, 2008) is an American professional soccer player who plays as a forward for Major League Soccer club New York Red Bulls and MLS Next Pro side New York Red Bulls II.

== Club career ==
=== Early career ===
Born in Pittsburgh, Pennsylvania, Rosborough began playing at age four, through age 14 with Beadling Soccer Club. In 2022, he joined the New York Red Bulls Academy featuring within Red Bulls Academy at the U-15 level. On September 7, 2023, Rosborough signed an MLS Next Pro contract. As part of the contract, Rosborough joined the first team on an MLS contract starting in 2025 through the 2028 MLS season, with an option for 2029.

=== New York Red Bulls II ===
On April 21, 2023, Rosborough made his professional debut with New York Red Bulls II against New England Revolution II, making him one of the youngest players to appear in a match in club history. On June 30, 2024, Rosborough scored his first goal as a professional in a 1–3 loss to Columbus Crew 2. On August 4, 2024, Rosborough scored the opening goal for New York in a 4–3 victory over Chicago Fire FC II, as a result recording a goal in five straight matches, the second-longest streak in franchise history.

== International career ==
Rosborough has represented the United States at the under-15 and under-16 level. Rosborough scored two goals in six matches helping the United States claim the U15 CONCACAF Championship title.

On February 3, 2025, Rosborough was selected to the United States U17 roster for the CONCACAF qualifiers.

== Career statistics ==
As of match played October 18, 2026

Appearances and goals by club, season and competition
| Club | Season | League | | | U.S. Open Cup | | Continental | | Other | | Total | |
| Club | Season | Division | Apps | Goals | Apps | Goals | Apps | Goals | Apps | Goals | Apps | Goals |
|---|---|---|---|---|---|---|---|---|---|---|---|---|
| New York Red Bulls II | 2023 | MLS Next Pro | 2 | 0 | 0 | 0 | — | | 0 | 0 | 2 | 0 |
| New York Red Bulls II | 2024 | MLS Next Pro | 23 | 7 | 0 | 0 | — | | 0 | 0 | 23 | 7 |
| New York Red Bulls II | 2025 | MLS Next Pro | 14 | 7 | 0 | 0 | — | | 4 (Note: Appearances in MLS Next Pro playoffs) | 0 | 18 | 7 |
| New York Red Bulls II | 2026 | MLS Next Pro | 6 | 1 | — | | — | | 2 | 2 | 8 | 3 |
| New York Red Bulls II | Total | | 45 | 15 | 0 | 0 | — | | 6 | 2 | 51 | 17 |
| New York Red Bulls | 2026 | Major League Soccer | 5 | 0 | 0 | 0 | — | | — | | 5 | 0 |
| Career total | | | 50 | 15 | 0 | 0 | 0 | 0 | 6 | 2 | 56 | 17 |
