= Máximo Carrizo =

American soccer player (born 2008)

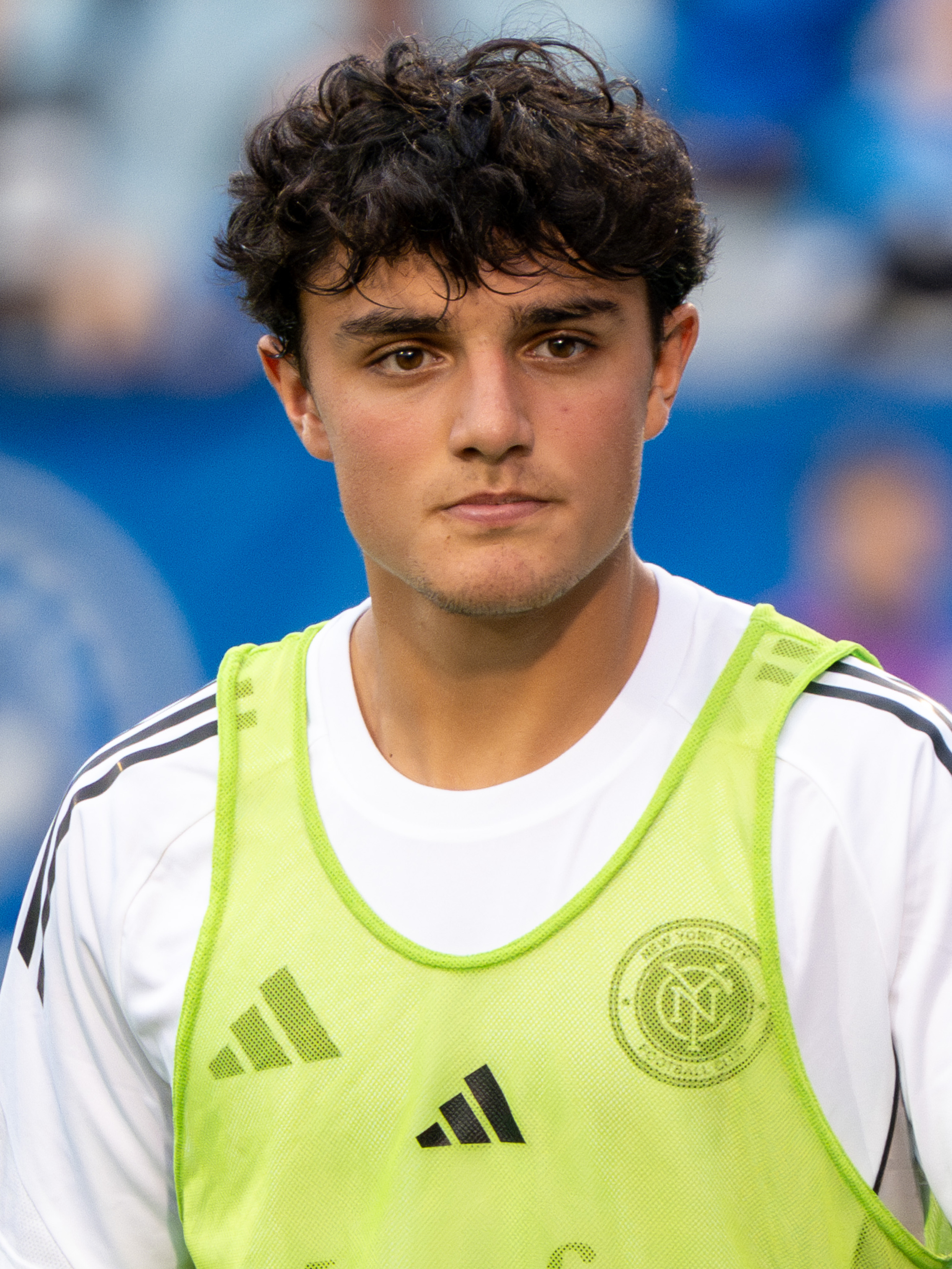
- Carrizo in 2025

Personal information
- Full name: Máximo Augusto Carrizo Ballesteros
- Date of birth: February 28, 2008 (age 18)
- Place of birth: New York City, New York, United States
- Position: Midfielder

Team information
- Current team: New York City FC
- Number: 29

Youth career
- New York City FC
- FC Westchester

Senior career*
Years	Team	Apps	(Gls)
2022–	New York City FC II	17	(0)
2022–	New York City FC	6	(0)

International career^{‡}
2023	Argentina U15	1	(0)
2023	United States U16	4	(0)
2025–	United States U17	7	(5)
2024–	United States U18	3	(0)
- * Club domestic league appearances and goals as of September 24, 2023 ‡ National team caps and goals as of November 14, 2025

Máximo Augusto Carrizo Ballesteros (born February 28, 2008) is an American professional soccer player who plays as a midfielder for MLS Next Pro club New York City FC II.

== Club career ==
In 2022, Carrizo signed for Major League Soccer club New York City FC, becoming the youngest player to sign a professional contract in American top flight history. He made his first debut on March 22, 2025, appearing as a 73rd minute substitution in a 0–0 draw against Columbus Crew.

== International career ==
Born in the United States and of Argentinean heritage, Carrizo is eligible to represent either the United States or Argentina. In January 2022, he was called up to a training camp for the United States U15s. In November 2022, he was called up to a training camp for the Argentina U17s.

Carrizo made his youth international debut in June 2023 with the United States U16s, playing in two friendly matches at the International Dream Cup in Japan. In July 2023, he was called up to the Argentina U15s and played in one friendly. In May 2024, he was called up to the United States U16s for two friendly matches in Buenos Aires, Argentina, notably captaining the United States U16s against the Argentina U16s in a 2–2 draw at the Argentine Football Association National Training Center, where he had previously trained at with Argentina youth national teams.
