= Alejandro López (footballer, born 2009) =

Dominican Republic footballer (born 2009)

Personal information
- Full name: Alejandro López Tamarez
- Date of birth: 28 January 2009 (age 17)
- Height: 1.84 m (6 ft 0 in)
- Position: Centre-back

Team information
- Current team: Rayo Vallecano (youth)

Youth career
- 2018–2025: Atlético Madrid
- 2025–: Rayo Vallecano

International career^{‡}
Years	Team	Apps	(Gls)
2025–2026	Dominican Republic U17	5	(2)
2026–	Dominican Republic	2	(0)
- ‡ National team caps and goals as of 13:40, 4 June 2026 (UTC)

Alejandro López Tamarez (born 28 January 2009) is a professional footballer who plays as a centre-back for the youth academy of Rayo Vallecano. Born in Spain, he plays for the Dominican Republic national football team.

== Club career ==
López began his youth career at Atlético Madrid, one of Spain's most prominent academies. In July 2025, he joined the youth academy of fellow La Liga club Rayo Vallecano, where he has featured for the Juvenil B side.

== International career ==
Born in Spain, López is of Dominican descent. He represented the Dominican Republic at under-17 level, featuring in the 2026 CONCACAF U-17 Qualifiers, where he was named in the team of the tournament. He started in the Dominican Republic's final group stage match against the United States, which ended in a 1–1 draw.

López subsequently received a call-up to the senior Dominican Republic squad under head coach Marcelo Neveleff, and started in a friendly against Panama in June 2026.
