= 2026 New England Revolution II season =

New England Revolution II
2026 season
- Owner: The Kraft Group
- Head coach: Pablo Moreira
- Stadium: Beirne Stadium
- MLS Next Pro: Eastern Conference: TBD
- MLS Next Pro Playoffs: N/A
Home colors	Away colors

The 2026 New England Revolution II season is the seventh season in the soccer team's history, where they competed in the third division of American soccer, MLS Next Pro. As a lower division team of the parent club, they are not eligible to compete in the US Open Cup.

Head Coach Richie Williams' contract was not renewed at the end of the 2025 season. Former first team interim head coach Pablo Moreira was named on Dec 3, 2025 to replace Williams.

On January 21, 2026, the team announced that all 14 home games would be played at Beirne Stadium on the campus of Bryant University in Smithfield, Rhode Island.

== Club ==
=== Roster ===
Roster Update: Nov 5, 2025:
As of August 10, 2026.

No.	Pos.	Nat.	Name
8	MF	(United States)	Joseph Buck
10	FW	(United States)	Jayden Da
6	DF	(Sweden)	Gabe Dahlin
32	FW	(United States)	Malcolm Fry+
20	FW	(United States)	Sharod George
73	GK	(Panama)	John David Gunn+
5	DF	(United States)	Keegan Hughes+
38	MF	(United States)	Eric Klein
4	DF	(United States)	Chris Mbaï-Assem
19	DF	(United States)	Damario McIntosh+
3	DF	(United States) | (Haiti)	Schinieder Mimy
21	FW	(Canada)	Myles Morgan
23	MF	(United States)	Javaun Mussenden
35	MF	(United States)	Cristiano Oliveira+
18	DF	(Uganda)	Allan Oyirwoth+
33	GK	(United States)	Donovan Parisian+
17	MF	(Japan)	Shuma Sasaki
15	DF	(United States)	Jake Shannon
65	MF	(United States)	Judah Siqueira,+
2	DF	(United States)	Jared Smith
14	DF	(United States)	Tylon Smith+
50	GK	(United States)	Matthew Tibbetts
27	GK	(United States)	Max Weinstein
77	FW	(United States)	Makai Wells
7	FW	(Ecuador)	Marcos Zambrano+
11	MF	(Venezuela)	Carlos Zambrano

+ On loan from first team
++ Out on loan

=== Academy Roster ===
Updated September 9, 2025

No.	Pos.	Nat.	Name
42	DF	(United States)	Eli Ackerman
44	MF	(United States)	Logan Azar
76	FW	(United States)	Cristiano Carlos
48	GK	(United States)	Julian Chapman
78	FW	(United States)	Grant Emerhi
58	GK	(United States)	Ryker Fauth
54	MF	(United States)	Edwin Flores
74	MF	(United States)	Levi Katsell
88	DF	(United States)	Sage Kinner
67	FW	(United States)	Josh Macedo
60	DF	(United States)	Sheridan McNish
99	MF	(United States)	Robert Nichols III
57	MF	(United States)	Bryan Norena
72	FW	(United States)	Aarin Prajapati
49	MF	(United States)	Ivan Villalobos Lopez
71	FW	(United States)	Matthew Jean Baptiste
70		(United States)	Daniel Dixon
91		(United States)	Zach LaPierre

=== No longer on the Roster ===
No.	Pos.	Nat.	Name
3	DF	(Jamaica)	Hesron Barry
9	FW	(Guyana)	Liam Butts
11	MF	(United States)	Gevork Diarbian
39	FW	(Brazil)	Marcos Dias
20	FW	(Jamaica)	Damorney Hutchinson
14	FW	(Philippines)	Alex Monis
5	DF	(United States)	Victor Souza
17	FW	(United States)	Michael Tsicoulias

=== Coaching staff ===
Name	Position
(United States) Pablo Moreira	Head coach
(United States) Michael Milazzo	Assistant coach
(United States) Brad Knighton	Assistant coach (Goalkeepers)

== Competitions ==
=== Preseason ===
January 28, 2026	New England Revolution II	5-4	Rhode Island FC
	Da; Buck (penalty scored) trialist trialist trialist	Report	unknown unknown unknown unknown

February 4, 2026	New England Revolution II	v	Brooklyn FC	Sarasota, Florida
3:00pm ET		Report

=== MLS NEXT Pro ===
==== Standings ====
Eastern Conference

Pos	Div	Team	Pld	W	SOW	SOL	L	GF	GA	GD	Pts	Qualification
3	SE	Atlanta United 2	28	14	1	4	9	62	46	+16	48	Round one
4	NE	Columbus Crew 2	28	12	5	2	9	49	43	+6	48	Round one
5	NE	New England Revolution II	28	12	4	4	8	47	42	+5	48	Round one
6	NE	New York City FC II	28	13	3	2	10	50	44	+6	47	Round one
7	NE	CT United FC	28	14	2	0	12	59	52	+7	46	Round one

Source: MLSNP
Rules for classification: 1) Points; 2) Total regulation wins; 3) Total goal differential; 4) Total goals scored; 5) Total shootout wins; 6) Away goal differential; 7) Away goals scored; 8) Home goals differential; 9) Home goals scored; 10) Fewer disciplinary points; 11) Drawing of lots.

Overall table

Pos	Div	Team	Pld	W	SOW	SOL	L	GF	GA	GD	Pts
7	SE	Atlanta United 2	28	14	1	4	9	62	46	+16	48
8	NE	Columbus Crew 2	28	12	5	2	9	49	43	+6	48
9	NE	New England Revolution II	28	12	4	4	8	47	42	+5	48
10	NE	New York City FC II	28	13	3	2	10	50	44	+6	47
11	NE	CT United FC	28	14	2	0	12	59	52	+7	46

Source: MLSNP
Rules for classification: 1) Points; 2) Total regulation wins; 3) Total goal differential; 4) Total goals scored; 5) Total shootout wins; 6) Away goal differential; 7) Away goals scored; 8) Home goals differential; 9) Home goals scored; 10) Fewer disciplinary points; 11) Drawing of lots.

==== Results summary ====
Overall									Home							Away						
Pld	W	SOW	SOL	L	GF	GA	GD	Pts	W	SOW	SOL	L	GF	GA	GD	W	SOW	SOL	L	GF	GA	GD
28	12	4	4	8	47	42	+5	48	6	2	1	5	22	23	−1	6	2	3	3	25	19	+6

Source: MLS NEXT Pro

==== Results by round ====
Round	1	2	3	4	5	6	7	8	9	10	11	12	13	14	15	16	17	18	19	20	21	22	23	24	25	26	27	28
Stadium	H	H	H	H	H	A	A	H	A	H	A	A	H	H	A	H	H	H	A	A	A	H	A	A	H	A	A	A
Result	SW	SW	W	W	L	L	SL	W	W	W	SW	W	W	L	W	L	SL	W	SL	W	W	L	L	L	L	SL	SW	W
Position (East)	6	5	4	2	7	7	9	8	5	3	3	4	4	5	4	5	6	3	4	3	3	4	4	4	7	7	6	5

Source: MLS NEXT Pro
A = Away; H = Home; W = Win; L = Loss; SL = Shootout Loss; SW = Shootout Win

==== Match results ====
March 1, 2026 1	New England Revolution II	1-1 (4–2 SO)	Atlanta United 2	Smithfield, Rhode Island
8:00 PM EDT	Da (yellow card) 23' Oliveira (yellow card) 65' Morgan 70' Mbaï-Assem (yellow card) 90+5'		Parisian 24' (o.g.)	Stadium: Beirne Stadium; Referee: Rodrigo Albuquerque

March 8, 2026 2	New England Revolution II	0-0 (7–6 SO)	Toronto FC II	Smithfield, Rhode Island
5:00 PM EDT	Mbai-Assem (yellow card) 54'; Mussenden (yellow card) 60'	Report	Boneau (yellow card) 33'; Fortier (yellow card) 76'; Omoregbe (yellow card) 79'	Stadium: Beirne Stadium; Referee: Lauren Aldrich

March 15, 2026 3	New England Revolution II	2-1	FC Cincinnati 2	Smithfield, Rhode Island
2:00 PM EDT	Wells 7'; Mbai-Assem (yellow card) 54'	Report	Chávez (yellow card) 24'; Holmes 86'; Lachekar 87' (o.g.)	Stadium: Beirne Stadium; Referee: Muhammad Kaleia

March 22, 2026 4	New England Revolution II	2-0	CT United FC	Smithfield, Rhode Island
2:00 PM EDT	Da 18', (yellow card) 20'; Fry 56'; McIntosh (yellow card) 76'	Report	Stephenson (yellow card) 63'; Sserwadda (yellow card) 88'; Tanyi (yellow card) 90'	Stadium: Beirne Stadium; Referee: Jorge Escobar

April 12, 2026 5	New England Revolution II	1-2	New York Red Bulls II	Smithfield, Rhode Island
2:00 PM EDT	Smith (yellow card) 41'; Zambrano 65'; Da (yellow card) 77'	Report	Mitchell 45+1'; Londoño (yellow card) 80'; Rodriguez (yellow card) 84'; Rojas 90+5'	Stadium: Beirne Stadium; Referee: Yannick Rothfuss

April 18, 2026 6	Columbus Crew 2	2-1	New England Revolution II	Columbus, Ohio
3:00 PM EDT	Brown (yellow card) 40'; Gbamblé 43'; Zengue 47'; Rogers (yellow card) 52'	Report	Zambrano (yellow card) 55'; Morgan 60'; Fry (yellow card) 75'; Mussenden (yellow card) 86'; Dahlin (yellow card) 90+6'	Stadium: ScottsMiracle-Gro Field; Referee: Igor Bych

May 3, 2026 7	CT United FC	0-0 (6–5 SO)	New England Revolution II	Storrs, Connecticut
6:00 PM EDT	Perdomo (yellow card) 39'; Sserwadda (yellow card) 82'	Report	Dahlin (yellow card) 60'; Oyirwoth (yellow card) 63'; Mimy (yellow card) 69'; Parisian (yellow card) 90+1'	Stadium: Morrone Stadium; Referee: Gary Gutierrez

May 10, 2026 8	New England Revolution II	3-2	New York City FC II	Smithfield, Rhode Island
2:00 PM EDT	Morgan (penalty scored) 57'; Sasaki (penalty scored) 62'; Oliveira (yellow card) 68'; McIntosh 83'; Da (yellow card) 90'	Report	Santos (yellow card) 23'; Musu 27'; Hvatum 76'; Smith (yellow card) 77'	Stadium: Beirne Stadium; Referee: Edson Carvajal

May 13, 2026 9	Philadelphia Union II	0-1	New England Revolution II	Chester, Pennsylvania
7:00 PM EDT	Olivas (yellow card) 8' (yellow-red card) , 31'; Griffin (yellow card) 26'; Berthé (yellow card) 45+11'; Jakupovic (yellow card) 57'; De Paula (yellow card) 62'	Report	Mussenden (yellow card) 42'; McIntosh (yellow card) 57'; Shannon 76'; Sasaki (yellow card) 89'	Stadium: Subaru Park; Referee: Walterson Torchon

May 17, 2026 10	New England Revolution II	1-0	Orlando City B	Smithfield, Rhode Island
2:00 PM EDT	Fry (yellow card) 51'; Siqueira 90+1'	Report	Ramirez (yellow card) 15'	Stadium: Beirne Stadium; Referee: Amin Hadzic

May 22, 2026 11	Crown Legacy FC	2-2 (3–4 SO)	New England Revolution II	Matthews, North Carolina
2:00 PM EDT	Kamdem 30'; Richmond (yellow card) 51'; Johnson 76'	Report	Shannon 15'; Morgan (yellow card) 9', (goal) 32'; Dahlin (yellow card) 45+3'; Oyirwoth (yellow card) 46'	Stadium: Mecklenburg County Sportsplex; Referee: Elvis Osmanovic

June 7, 2026 12	FC Cincinnati 2	0-1	New England Revolution II	Highland Heights, Kentucky
6:00 PM EDT	Hinestroza (red card) 54'; Niang (yellow card) 56'; Lajhar (yellow card) 69' (yellow-red card) , 84'; Ramos (yellow card) 81'; Marioni (yellow card) 69'	Report	Da (yellow card) 69'; Carlos (yellow card) 71'; Zambrano 90+7'	Stadium: NKU Soccer Stadium; Referee: Deborah Da Silveira Madeira

June 14, 2026 13	New England Revolution II	2-1	New York Red Bulls II	Smithfield, Rhode Island
7:00 PM EDT	Morgan 38', (yellow card) 61'; Mussenden 45+1'; Buck (yellow card) 85'; Smith (yellow card) 86'	Report	Kone (yellow card) 7'; Worth (yellow card) 37'; Nelich (yellow card) 47'; Sanchez (yellow card) 55'; Gallagher 64'	Stadium: Beirne Stadium; Referee: Jeremy Scheer

June 21, 2026 14	New England Revolution II	1-2	Chicago Fire FC II	Smithfield, Rhode Island
7:00 PM EDT	Zambrano (penalty scored) 66'	Report	Cupps (yellow card) 13'; Pineda (yellow card) 30'; Boltz 38'; Hlyut 44'	Stadium: Beirne Stadium; Referee: Andrew Porad

June 28, 2026 15	Toronto FC II	1-3	New England Revolution II	Toronto, Ontario
3:00 PM EDT	Nolan 27', (yellow card) 46'	Report	Sasaki (yellow card) 44'; Smith 53'; Oliveira (yellow card) 69'; Morgan 87'; Oyirwoth 90+1'	Stadium: York Lions Stadium; Referee: Sebastian Noshinravani

July 5, 2026 16	New England Revolution II	0-4	Philadelphia Union II	Smithfield, Rhode Island
7:00 PM EDT	McIntosh (yellow card) 44'; Zambrano (yellow card) 56'	Report	Davis 17', 65', 84'; Moore (yellow card) 19'; LeBlanc 23'	Stadium: Beirne Stadium; Referee: Kevin Broadley

July 15, 2026 17	New England Revolution II	2-2 (3–4 SO)	Columbus Crew 2	Smithfield, Rhode Island
7:00 PM EDT	Morgan 34'; Oyirwoth (yellow card) 75'; Mbai-Assem (yellow card) 90+2' (yellow-red card) , 90+5'; Baptiste 90+7'	Report	Gbamblé 20'; Oyirwoth 39' (o.g.); Chirinos (yellow card) 40'; Heffess (yellow card) 72'; Danjaji (yellow card) 90+2'; Rincón (yellow card) 90+4'	Stadium: Beirne Stadium; Referee: Nicholas Strednak

July 23, 2026 18	New England Revolution II	3-0	New York City FC II	Foxborough, Massachusetts
11:00 AM EDT	Prajapati (yellow card) 32'; Acito 38' (o.g.); Zambrano 45+3'; Baptiste 45+5'	Report	Acito (yellow card) 10'; Molinari (yellow card) 36'; Santos (yellow card) 45+2' (yellow-red card) , 90+1'	Stadium: Gillette Stadium; Referee: Mario Maric

July 26, 2026 19	FC Cincinnati 2	2-2 (3–1 SO)	New England Revolution II	Highland Heights, Kentucky
6:00 PM EDT	Chirila 12', 81'; Jimenez (yellow card) 49'	Report	Dahlin (yellow card) 10', (goal) 15'; Mbai-Assem (yellow card) 30'; Zambrano 57'; Klein (yellow card) 73'	Stadium: NKU Soccer Stadium; Referee: Stefan Perri

August 2, 2026 20	New York Red Bulls II	1-4	New England Revolution II	Montclair, New Jersey
7:00 PM EDT	Worth (yellow card) 18'; Nelich (yellow card) 21'; Rojas (yellow card) 56' (yellow-red card) , 59'; Bori 79'	Report	Buck (yellow card) 13'; Baptiste 19'; Morgan 28', 49'; Siqueira 46', (yellow card) 79'; Dahlin (yellow card) 52'; Katsell (red card) 82'	Stadium: MSU Soccer Park; Referee: Braeden Frey

August 8, 2026 21	CT United FC	1-2	New England Revolution II	New Haven, Connecticut
7:00 PM EDT	Sserwadda (yellow card) 32'; Paixão 46'; Lacy (yellow card) 45+2'; Petrie (yellow card) 76'; Kamrath (yellow card) 83'	Report	Baptiste 8'; Wells (yellow card) 37'; Morgan 55'	Stadium: Reese Stadium; Referee: Nick Karnovsky

August 16, 2026 22	New England Revolution II	3-4	Philadelphia Union II	Smithfield, Rhode Island
7:00 PM EDT	Zambrano (yellow card) 11'; Morgan 15'; Wells (yellow card) 45' (yellow-red card) , 45+4'; Oliveira 45+16', (yellow card) 68'; Dahlin 66'; Mussenden (yellow card) 89'; Azar (yellow card) 90+7'	Report	Griffin 10'; LeBlanc 27', 45+18'; Mendoza (yellow card) 45+13'; Sundstrom (yellow card) 62'; Korzeniowski 84'; Berthe (yellow card) 90+5'	Stadium: Beirne Stadium; Referee: Colby Johnson

August 19, 2026 23	Inter Miami CF II	4-2	New England Revolution II	Fort Lauderdale, Florida
7:00 PM EDT	Rey 12', 25'; Acevedo 32'; Zeltzer-Zubida 72'; Flores (yellow card) 87'	Report	Morgan 43'; Prajapati (yellow card) 48'; Baptiste 71'	Stadium: Chase Stadium; Referee: Richonne Clark

August 22, 2026 24	New York City FC II	2-1	New England Revolution II	New York City, New York
5:00 PM EDT	Flax 7', (yellow card) 80'; Lopez (yellow card) 48'; Campos (yellow card) 68'; Loiola (red card) 83'; Arroyave (yellow card) 90+7'	Report	Morgan 13'; Shannon 65' (o.g.); Mimy (yellow card) 90'	Stadium: Icahn Stadium; Referee: Stephen Foster

August 30, 2026 25	New England Revolution II	1-4	Huntsville City FC	Smithfield, Rhode Island
7:00 PM EDT	M Zambrano 6'	Report	Yanez 24', 66'; Knight 48'; Brunet 88'	Stadium: Beirne Stadium; Referee: Promise Adebayo-Ige

September 4, 2026 26	Carolina Core FC	2-2 (3–5 SO)	New England Revolution II	High Point, North Carolina
6:30 PM EDT	Raimbault (yellow card) 66'; Swinehart 71', (yellow card) 75'; Hammond 90+2'	Report	Oliveira (yellow card) 39'; M Zambrano 83', 87'; Sasaki (yellow card) 90+6'	Stadium: Truist Point; Referee: Stefan Perri

September 11, 2026 27	Columbus Crew 2	1-1 (3–5 SO)	New England Revolution II	Columbus, Ohio
6:00 PM EDT	Gbamblé (yellow card) 25'; Nyeman (yellow card) 32'; Adams (yellow card) 35'; Rincón (yellow card) 79'; Danjaji 89'	Report	Azar (yellow card) 26'; Smith 29'; Mbai-Assem (yellow card) 72'; Parisian (yellow card) 73'	Stadium: Historic Crew Stadium; Referee: William Hale

September 20, 2026 28	Toronto FC II	1-3	New England Revolution II	Toronto, Ontario
2:00 PM EDT	Boneau (yellow card) 35'; Costabile 45'	Report	Morgan 14'; Smith (yellow card) 31'; Mussenden 62'; McIntosh 84'; Dahlin (yellow card) 84'	Stadium: York Lions Stadium; Referee: Mario Al-Ayass

=== Playoffs ===
==== Match results ====
October 17, 2026 First Round	Columbus Crew 2	v	New England Revolution II	Columbus, Ohio
3:00 PM EDT				Stadium: ScottsMiracle-Gro Field

== Statistics ==
=== Top scorers ===
As of September 30, 2026

Rank	Position	No.	Name	MLSNP
1	FW	21	(Canada) Myles Morgan	14
2	FW	71	(United States) Matthew Jean Baptiste	5
2	MF	11	(Venezuela) Carlos Zambrano	5
4	FW	7	(Ecuador) Marcos Zambrano	3
5	MF	15	(United States) Jake Shannon	2
5	MF	65	(United States) Judah Siqueira	2
5	DF	6	(Sweden) Gabe Dahlin	2
5	MF	23	(United States) Javaun Mussenden	2
5	DF	2	(United States) Damario McIntosh	2
5	DF	19	(United States) Jared Smith	2
11	FW	32	(United States) Malcolm Fry	1
11	FW	10	(United States) Jayden Da	1
11	FW	77	(United States) Makai Wells	1
11	MF	17	(Japan) Shuma Sasaki	1
11	MF	18	(Uganda) Allan Oyirwoth	1
11	MF	35	(United States) Cristiano Oliveira	1
			own goal	2
Total				47

== See also ==
- 2026 New England Revolution season
