= 2025 New England Revolution II season =

New England Revolution II
2025 season
- Owner: The Kraft Group
- Head coach: Richie Williams
- Stadium: Gillette Stadium
- MLS Next Pro: Eastern Conference: 3rd
- MLS Next Pro Playoffs: Lost in first round
Home colors	Away colors

The 2025 New England Revolution II season is the sixth season in the soccer team's history, where they competed in the third division of American soccer, MLS Next Pro. New England Revolution II, as a child club of New England Revolution of Major League Soccer, were barred from participating in the 2025 U.S. Open Cup. New England Revolution II played their home games at Gillette Stadium, located in Foxborough, Massachusetts, United States.

Marcos Dias was named Playmaker of the Year in MLS Next Pro for this season.

== Club ==
=== Roster ===
Roster Update: Oct 11, 2024:
As of August 23, 2025.

No.	Pos.	Nat.	Name
3	DF	(Jamaica)	Hesron Barry
8	MF	(United States)	Joseph Buck
9	FW	(Guyana)	Liam Butts
–	FW	(United States)	Jayden Da
6	DF	(Sweden)	Gabe Dahlin
11	MF	(United States)	Gevork Diarbian
39	FW	(Brazil)	Marcos Dias
32	FW	(United States)	Malcolm Fry+
xx	FW	(United States)	Sharod George
73	GK	(Panama)	John David Gunn
4	DF	(United States)	Keegan Hughes+
20	FW	(Jamaica)	Damorney Hutchinson
31	MF	(United States)	Eric Klein
25	DF	(United States)	Chris Mbaï-Assem
30	DF	(United States)	Damario McIntosh+
14	FW	(Philippines)	Alex Monis
35	MF	(United States)	Cristiano Oliveira
18	DF	(United States)	Allan Oyirwoth (on loan from parent club)
33	GK	(United States)	Donovan Parisian
5	DF	(United States)	Victor Souza
17	FW	(United States)	Michael Tsicoulias
27	GK	(United States)	Max Weinstein++

+ On loan from first team
++ Out on loan

=== Academy Roster ===
Updated September 9, 2025

No.	Pos.	Nat.	Name
42	DF	(United States)	Eli Ackerman
46	GK	(United States)	Owen Beninga
45	FW	(United States)	Cristiano Carlos
48	GK	(United States)	Julian Chapman
60	MF	(United States)	Giuseppe Ciampa
69	FW	(United States)	Grant Emehri
58	GK	(United States)	Ryker Fauth
54	MF	(United States)	Edwin Flores
56		(United States)	Enzo Goncalves
44	MF	(United States)	Levi Katsell
88	DF	(United States)	Sage Kinner
41	FW	(United States)	Josh Macedo
52	DF	(United States)	Sheridan McNish
50	MF	(United States)	Javaun Mussenden
99	MF	(United States)	Robert Nichols III
57	MF	(United States)	Bryan Norena
55	MF	(United States)	Joshua Partal
53	FW	(United States)	Aarin Prajapati
89	MF	(United States)	Aidan Reilly
47	FW	(United States)	Judah Siqueira
49	MF	(United States)	Ivan Villalobos Lopez
40	FW	(United States)	Makai Wells

=== Coaching staff ===
Name	Position
(United States) Richie Williams	Head coach
(United States) Michael Milazzo	Assistant coach
(United States) Brad Knighton	Assistant coach (Goalkeepers)

== Competitions ==
=== Preseason ===
February 5, 2025	New England Revolution II	2-0	FC Naples (USL-1)	Bradenton, Florida
	Dias (penalty scored) 26'; Da 58'	Report		Stadium: IMG Academy

February 10, 2025	New England Revolution II	2-1	FC Cincinnati 2	Bradenton, Florida
	Hughes 15', 26'	Report	unknown	Stadium: IMG Academy

=== MLS NEXT Pro ===
==== Standings ====
Eastern Conference

Pos	Div	Team	Pld	W	SOW	SOL	L	GF	GA	GD	Pts	Qualification
1	NE	New York Red Bulls II (C)	28	17	2	3	6	68	56	+12	58	Qualification for the Playoffs
2	NE	Philadelphia Union II	28	15	5	3	5	64	34	+30	58	Qualification for the Playoffs
3	NE	New England Revolution II	28	14	5	2	7	54	37	+17	54	Qualification for the Playoffs
4	SE	Chattanooga FC	28	13	5	4	6	42	36	+6	53	Qualification for the Playoffs
5	SE	Huntsville City FC	28	14	4	2	8	56	32	+24	52	Qualification for the Playoffs

Source: MLSNP
Rules for classification: 1) points; 2) total regulation wins; 3) total goal differential; 4) total goals scored; 5) total shootout wins; 6) away goal differential; 7) away goals scored; 8) home goals differential; 9) home goals scored; 10) fewer disciplinary points; 11) drawing of lots
(C) Champion

Overall table

Pos	Div	Team	Pld	W	SOW	SOL	L	GF	GA	GD	Pts
2	NE	New York Red Bulls II (C)	28	17	2	3	6	68	56	+12	58
3	NE	Philadelphia Union II	28	15	5	3	5	64	34	+30	58
4	NE	New England Revolution II	28	14	5	2	7	54	37	+17	54
5	SE	Chattanooga FC	28	13	5	4	6	42	36	+6	53
6	SE	Huntsville City FC	28	14	4	2	8	56	32	+24	52

Source: MLSNP
Rules for classification: 1) points; 2) total regulation wins; 3) total goal differential; 4) total goals scored; 5) total shootout wins; 6) away goal differential; 7) away goals scored; 8) home goals differential; 9) home goals scored; 10) fewer disciplinary points; 11) drawing of lots
(C) Champion

==== Results summary ====
Overall								Home						Away					
Pld	W	D	L	GF	GA	GD	Pts	W	D	L	GF	GA	GD	W	D	L	GF	GA	GD
28	14	7	7	54	37	+17	49	8	4	2	27	12	+15	6	3	5	27	25	+2

Source: MLS NEXT Pro

==== Results by round ====
Round	1	2	3	4	5	6	7	8	9	10	11	12	13	14	15	16	17	18	19	20	21	22	23	24	25	26	27	28
Stadium	H	H	H	A	H	H	A	A	A	A	A	H	A	H	A	A	H	H	A	H	H	A	H	H	A	A	H	A
Result	SW	W	W	L	SW	W	SW	L	L	W	SW	L	SL	W	W	W	W	W	L	SW	W	W	SL	W	W	L	L	W
Position (East)	6	1	1	5	6	4	3	6	7	4	5	7	8	8	6	5	4	4	5	5	5	5	3	3	2	3	3	3

Source: MLS NEXT Pro
A = Away; H = Home; W = Win; L = Loss; SL = Shootout Loss; SW = Shootout Win

==== Match results ====
March 9, 2025 1	New England Revolution II	0-0 (4–3 SO)	Philadelphia Union II	Foxborough, Massachusetts
3:00 PM EDT	Barry (yellow card) 32'; McIntosh (yellow card) 68'; Hughes (yellow card) 88'	Report	Pierre (yellow card) 88'; Harriel (yellow card) 53'; Pariano (yellow card) 88'	Stadium: Gillette Stadium; Referee: Jeremy Scheer

March 13, 2025 2	New England Revolution II	2-0	FC Cincinnati 2	Foxborough, Massachusetts
5:00 PM EDT	Barry (yellow card) 30'; Hutchinson 73'; Dias 75'	Report	Hurtado (yellow card) 36'; Mboma Dem (yellow card) 90+4'	Stadium: Gillette Stadium; Referee: Rogelio Alvarez

March 28, 2025 3	New England Revolution II	4-0	Toronto FC II	Foxborough, Massachusetts
3:00 PM EDT	Dias 17'; Souza (yellow card) 18'; McIntosh (yellow card) 47'; Butts 65', (yellow card) 80', (goal) 88'; Escobar 75'	Report	Ythallo (yellow card) 15'	Stadium: Gillette Stadium; Referee: Luis Arroyo

April 9, 2025 4	Orlando City B	1-0	New England Revolution II	Kissimmee, Florida
7:00 PM EDT	Clapier (yellow card) 58'; Reid-Brown (yellow card) 62'; Mohammed 81'; Tori (yellow card) 88'	Report	Barry (yellow card) 17'; Klein (yellow card) 44'	Stadium: Osceola County Stadium; Referee: Benjamin Meyer

April 23, 2025 5	New England Revolution II	2-2 (4–1 SO)	Columbus Crew 2	Foxborough, Massachusetts
5:00 PM EDT	Butts 22'; Oliveira 78'	Report	Rogers 1'; Adams 67'; Palacios (yellow card) 90+1'; Sy (yellow card) 90+4'	Stadium: Gillette Stadium; Referee: Marie Durr

April 26, 2025 6	New England Revolution II	2-1	New York City FC II	Foxborough, Massachusetts
3:00 PM EDT	Oliveira (yellow card) 12'; Butts 18'; Barry (yellow card) 20'; Oyirwoth 71'; Souza (yellow card) 78'	Report	Elias 20'	Stadium: Gillette Stadium; Referee: Jade Mallea

May 4, 2025 7	Toronto FC II	3-3 (8-9 SO)	New England Revolution II	Toronto, Ontario
3:00 PM EDT	Stojadinovic 5'; Barry 63'; Henry (yellow card) 54'; Fisher (yellow card) 77'; Dahlin 78' (o.g.); Fisher (red card) postgame'	Report	Butts 15'; Diarbian 39'; Hutchinson (yellow card) 45+2'; Dias 49' (pen.); Souza (yellow card) 90+1'	Stadium: York Lions Stadium; Referee: Nivin Raizada

May 18, 2025 8	New York Red Bulls II	4-1	New England Revolution II	Montclair, New Jersey
5:00 PM EDT	Rosborough 37', 39'; Jimenez 66'; Berkley 86'	Report	Nichols (yellow card) 55'; Goncalves 77'; Mussenden (yellow card) 79'; Dahlin (yellow card) 90+1'	Stadium: MSU Soccer Park; Referee: Matt Thompson

May 24, 2025 9	Chattanooga FC	1-0	New England Revolution II	Chattanooga, Tennessee
7:00 PM EDT	Plougmand 11'; Ortiz (yellow card) 28'; Robertson (yellow card) 87'	Report	Barry (yellow card) 58'; Oliveira (yellow card) 80'	Stadium: Finley Stadium; Attendance: 2,752; Referee: Alejo Calume

May 31, 2025 10	New York City FC II	0-1	New England Revolution II	New York City, New York
4:00 PM EDT	Molinari (yellow card) 45+2'	Report	Reilly (yellow card) 30'; Fry 89'	Stadium: Belson Stadium; Referee: Izlen Peksenar

June 8, 2025 (was Apr 12) 11	Chicago Fire FC II	2-2 (4-5 SO)	New England Revolution II	Bridgeview, Illinois
4:00 PM EDT	Nagle (yellow card) 16'; Diouf 42'; Soudan (yellow card) 64'; Cassano 78'	Report	Siqueira 15'; Macedo 59'; Diarbian (yellow card) 90+5'	Stadium: SeatGeek Stadium; Referee: Kaitlyn Trowbridge

June 15, 2025 12	New England Revolution II	0-1	FC Cincinnati 2	Foxborough, Massachusetts
3:00 PM EDT	Barry (yellow card) 38'; Dahlin (yellow card) 83'	Report	Adnan (yellow card) 5'; Schaefer 40'; Kristel (yellow card) 90+1'; Chirila (yellow card) 90+2'	Stadium: Gillette Stadium; Referee: Calin Radosav

June 26, 2025 13	Philadelphia Union II	2–2 (7–6 SO)	New England Revolution II	Chester, Pennsylvania
7:00 PM EDT	Sullivan 61'; Uzcategui 68'	Report	Mussenden (yellow card) 2', (goal) 55'; Dias 27', (yellow card) 90'; Buck (yellow card) 67'; Butts (yellow card) 73'	Stadium: Subaru Park; Referee: Salvador Flores

June 29, 2025 PPD Sep 9 14	New England Revolution II	1-0	Huntsville City FC	Foxborough, Massachusetts
7:00 PM EDT	Souza (yellow card) 36'; Oliveira 45+3'; Barry (yellow card) 75'; Buck (yellow card) 86'; McIntosh (yellow card) 90+1'; Tsicoulias (yellow card) 90+4'; Parisian (yellow card) 90+5'	Report	Mayaka (yellow card) 21'; Knight (yellow card) 53'; Veliz (yellow card) 80'; Carleton (yellow card) 90+3'	Stadium: Gillette Stadium; Referee: Velimir Stefanovic

July 5, 2025 15	Columbus Crew 2	1-2	New England Revolution II	Columbus, Ohio
3:00 PM EDT	Elliot (yellow card) 10'; Palacios (yellow card) 37'; Adams 85'	Report	Fry 46'; Buck (yellow card) 55'; Oliveira 90+2'; Emerhi (yellow card) 90+7'	Stadium: Historic Crew Stadium; Referee: Kyle Cividanes

July 13, 2025 16	Chicago Fire FC II	3-4	New England Revolution II	Bridgeview, Illinois
2:00 PM EDT	Borso 11' (pen.); Oyegunle 27'; Shokalook (yellow card) 76'; Fleming 86'	Report	Oliveira 1'; Fry 6'; Butts 37', 53'; Buck (yellow card) 90+1'	Stadium: SeatGeek Stadium; Referee: DeShun Beard

July 20, 2025 17	New England Revolution II	3-0	Orlando City B	Foxborough, Massachusetts
3:00 PM EDT	Diarbian 18', (yellow card) 45+5', (goal) 51' (pen.); Butts (yellow card) 44'; Monis 78'	Report	Caraballo (yellow card) 37'; Guske (yellow card) 45+3'; Tori (yellow card) 66'	Stadium: Gillette Stadium; Referee: Nick Karnovsky

July 30, 2025 18	New England Revolution II	3-0	Atlanta United 2	Foxborough, Massachusetts
11:00 AM EDT	Dias 4' (pen.); Fry 11'; Butts 25'; Hutchinson (yellow card) 71'; Oyirwoth (yellow card) 88'	Report	Armas (yellow card) 44'; Majub (yellow card) 90+5'	Stadium: Gillette Stadium; Referee: Andrew Porada

August 2, 2025 19	Carolina Core FC	1-0	New England Revolution II	High Point, North Carolina
7:30 PM EDT	Scarlett 74'	Report	Barry (yellow card) 85'; Souza (yellow card) 90+4'	Stadium: Truist Point; Referee: Russell Miller

August 8, 2025 20	New England Revolution II	2-2 (5-4 SO)	Columbus Crew 2	Foxborough, Massachusetts
7:00 PM EDT	Dias 71' (pen.); Barry (yellow card) 70'; Hutchinson (yellow card) 75', (goal) 88'	Report	Adams 48', 90+3'	Stadium: Gillette Stadium; Referee: Kyle Cividanes

August 15, 2025 21	New England Revolution II	4-2	New York Red Bulls II	Foxborough, Massachusetts
6:00 PM EDT	Butts 16'; Dias 44', 53'; Fry (yellow card) 49'; Diarbian 79'	Report	Kasule 33' (pen.); Dembele 57'; Jiménez (yellow card) 86'	Stadium: Gillette Stadium; Referee: Gary Gutierrez

August 24, 2025 22	Philadelphia Union II	1-3	New England Revolution II	Chester, Pennsylvania
3:00 PM EDT	Sequera (yellow card) 32'; Griffin (yellow card) 43'; Pierre 38' (o.g.); LeBlanc (yellow card) 74'; Jakupovic 90'	Report	Butts 35', 40'; McIntosh (yellow card) 73' (yellow-red card) , 79'; Monis (yellow card) 89'; Fry (yellow card) 90+5'	Stadium: Subaru Park; Referee: Servando Berna

August 31, 2025 23	New England Revolution II	2-2 (1-3 SO)	Chicago Fire FC II	Foxborough, Massachusetts
3:00 PM EDT	Dias 33'; Hutchinson 38'; Mussenden (yellow card) 47'; Dahlin (yellow card) 59'; Mbai-Assem (yellow card) 90+3'	Report	Nagle 22'; Fleming 59' (pen.); Pfrommer (yellow card) 61'; Nigg (yellow card) 62'	Stadium: Gillette Stadium; Referee: Joe Surgan

September 12, 2025 24	New England Revolution II	2-1	Toronto FC II	Foxborough, Massachusetts
3:00 PM EDT	Hutchinson 24'; Diarbian 56'	Report	McDonald 69' (pen.); Olguin (yellow card) 84'	Stadium: Gillette Stadium; Referee: Muhammad Hassan

September 18, 2025 25	New York City FC II	1-3	New England Revolution II	Manhattan
7:30 PM EDT	Elias (yellow card) 49'; Bilden 65'; Pinho (yellow card) 89'	Report	Oliveira 22'; Diarbian 35'; Mussenden (yellow card) 37'; Dias 47'	Stadium: Icahn Stadium; Referee: Stephen Foster

September 21, 2025 26	FC Cincinnati 2	3-1	New England Revolution II	Highland Heights, Kentucky
6:00 PM EDT	Flores 49'; Kuisel 56'; A Chirila (yellow card) 88'; S Chirilă 90+4'; Jimenez (yellow card) 90+9'	Report	Tsicoulias 43'; Souza (yellow card) 80'; Dias (yellow card) 82'	Stadium: NKU Soccer Stadium; Referee: Iryna Petrunok

September 26, 2025 27	New England Revolution II	0-1	Crown Legacy FC	Foxborough, Massachusetts
3:00 PM EDT	Barry (yellow card) 19'; Mussenden (yellow card) 63'; Emerhi (yellow card) 90+4'	Report	Thomas (yellow card) 51'; Subotić 76'; Tonidandel (yellow card) 81'	Stadium: Gillette Stadium; Referee: Carlos Rodriguez

October 5, 2025 28	Inter Miami CF II	2-5	New England Revolution II	Fort Lauderdale, Florida
1:00 PM EDT	Pinter 48'; Zelter-Zubida (yellow card) 49'; Obando 83'	Report	Fry 13'; Butts 15', 45'; Diarbian 32', 52'	Stadium: Chase Stadium; Referee: Abdou Ndiaye

=== Playoffs ===
==== Match results ====
October 19, 2025 First Round	New England Revolution II	0–1	Chicago Fire FC II	Foxborough, Massachusetts
6:00 PM EDT	Butts (yellow card) 43'; Klein (yellow card) 45'; Souza (yellow card) 80'	Report	Williams (yellow card) 61'; Poreba 86'; Kanyane (yellow card) 89'; Nigg (yellow card) 89'	Stadium: Gillette Stadium; Referee: Shawn Tehini

== Statistics ==
=== Top scorers ===
As of October 8, 2025

Rank	Position	No.	Name	MLSNP
1	FW	9	(Guyana) (United States) Liam Butts	13
2	FW	39	(Brazil) Marcos Dias	10
3	FW	11	(United States) Gevork Diarbian	8
4	FW	32	(United States) Malcolm Fry	5
4	MF	35	(United States) Cristiano Oliveira	5
6	FW	20	(United States) Damorney Hutchinson	4
7	MF	50	(United States) Javaun Mussenden	1
7	MF	56	(United States) Enzo Goncalves	1
7	FW	7	(United States) Olger Escobar	1
7	MF	18	(Uganda) Allan Oyirwoth	1
7	FW	47	(United States) Judah Siqueira	1
7	FW	41	(United States) Josh Macedo	1
7	FW	14	(United States) Alex Monis	1
7	FW	17	(United States) Michael Tsicoulias	1
7			own goal	1
Total				54

== See also ==
- 2025 New England Revolution season
