= 2024 New England Revolution II season =

New England Revolution II
2024 season
- Owner: The Kraft Group
- Head coach: Richie Williams
- Stadium: Gillette Stadium
- MLS Next Pro: Eastern Conference: 15th
- MLS Next Pro Playoffs: DNQ
Home colors	Away colors

The 2024 New England Revolution II season was the fifth season in the soccer team's history, where they competed in the third division of American soccer, MLS Next Pro. New England Revolution II, as a child club of New England Revolution of Major League Soccer, were barred from participating in the 2024 U.S. Open Cup. New England Revolution II played their home games at Gillette Stadium, located in Foxborough, Massachusetts, United States. On February 8, 2024, the team announced that eight of their 14 home games would be played at Mark A Ouellette Stadium in Hooksett, New Hampshire

== Club ==
=== Roster ===
End of Year Roster Updates: Nov 3, 2023:
As of Sep 20, 2024.

No.	Pos.	Nat.	Name
48	DF	(United States)	Jacob Akanyirige
42	DF	(United States)	Moshtaba Al-Hasnawi
10	MF	(United States)	Esmir Bajraktarevic+
3	DF	(Jamaica)	Hesron Barry
45	FW	(Serbia)	Andrej Bjelajac
23	MF	(Serbia)	Luka Borovic
16	MF	(United States)	Joshua Bolma+
33	MF	(United States)	Brandonn Bueno
9	FW	(United States)	Liam Butts
66	DF	(Puerto Rico)	Giovanni Calderón
11	MF	(United States)	Gevork Diarbian
39	FW	(Brazil)	Marcos Dias
7	FW	(United States) (Guatemala)	Olger Escobar
32	FW	(United States)	Malcolm Fry +
73	GK	(Panama)	John David Gunn
98	GK	(United States)	Jacob Jackson+
31	MF	(United States)	Eric Klein
17	MF	(United States)	Patrick Leal
13	MF	(Brazil)	Maciel
30	DF	(United States)	Damario McIntosh
76	DF	(United States)	Peyton Miller+
14	FW	(Philippines)	Alex Monis
22	MF	(United States)	Jack Panayotou+
41	DF	(Puerto Rico)	Colby Quiñones
4	DF	(United States)	Collin Smith Released 3/29:
5	DF	(United States)	Victor Souza
43	DF	(United States) (Uruguay)	Santiago Suárez+
27	GK	(United States)	Max Weinstein

+ On loan from first team

=== Academy Roster ===
Updated June 10, 2024

No.	Pos.	Nat.	Name
5	FW	(United States)	Gianluca Armellino
77	FW	(United States)	Braedon Smith
30	MF	(United States)	Ezra Widman
56	DF	(United States)	Jack Burkhardt
35	MF	(United States)	Cristiano Oliveira
53	MF	(United States)	Jamie Kabuusu
42	MF	(United States)	Alex Parvu
74	MF	(United States)	Gabriel Chavez
90	GK	(United States)	Ryan Carney
37	DF	(United States)	Steban Lopera
99	MF	(United States)	Robert Nichols
67	MF	(United States)	Mason Sullivan
89	MF	(United States)	Aidan Reilly
69	FW	(United States)	Grant Emehri
55	MF	(United States)	Joshua Partal
88	MF	(United States)	Sage Kinner

=== Coaching staff ===
Name	Position
(United States) Richie Williams	Head coach
(United States) Marcelo Santos	Associate head coach
(Japan) Yuta Nomura	Assistant coach (Goalkeepers)

== Competitions ==
=== Preseason ===
February 10, 2024	New England Revolution II	1-1	Orlando City B	Bradenton, Florida
11:00 AM EDT	Trialist 1 23'	Report	29'	Stadium: IMG Academy

February 13, 2024	New England Revolution II	0-1	Rhode Island FC (USL-C)	Bradenton, Florida
3:00 PM EDT		Report		Stadium: IMG Academy

February 17, 2024	New England Revolution II	3-2	Colorado Rapids 2	Bradenton, Florida
11:00 AM EDT	Monis 45+1', 63', 90'	Report	33'; 90+1'	Stadium: IMG Academy

February 24, 2024	New England Revolution II	2-0	CF Montréal U-23s	Foxboro, MA
1:00 PM EDT	Bolma, Leal	Report		Stadium: Gillette Stadium

March 2, 2024	New England Revolution II	2-?	Rhode Island FC (USL-C)	Foxboro, MA
	Fry, Leal	Report		Stadium: Gillette Stadium

=== MLS NEXT Pro ===
==== Standings ====
Eastern Conference

Pos	Div	Team	Pld	W	SOW	SOL	L	GF	GA	GD	Pts
11	NE	New York Red Bulls II	28	10	4	2	12	56	61	−5	40
12	NE	Toronto FC II	28	10	1	5	12	44	51	−7	37
13	SE	Atlanta United 2	28	7	4	3	14	42	64	−22	32
14	SE	Huntsville City FC	28	8	0	5	15	39	53	−14	29
15	NE	New England Revolution II	28	4	4	2	18	37	59	−22	22

Source: MLSNP Eastern Conference
Rules for classification: 1) points; 2) total wins; 3) total goal differential; 4) total goals scored; 5) fewer disciplinary points; 6) away goal differential; 7) away goals scored; 8) home goals differential; 9) home goals scored; 10) coin toss (2 clubs tied) or drawing of lots (≥3 clubs tied)

Overall table

Pos	Team	Pld	W	SOW	SOL	L	GF	GA	GD	Pts
25	Minnesota United FC 2	28	8	4	0	16	43	73	−30	32
26	Atlanta United 2	28	7	4	3	14	42	64	−22	32
27	Huntsville City FC	28	8	0	5	15	39	53	−14	29
28	Colorado Rapids 2	28	6	1	3	18	37	54	−17	23
29	New England Revolution II	28	4	4	2	18	37	59	−22	22

Source: MLSNP
Rules for classification: 1) points; 2) total wins; 3) total goal differential; 4) total goals scored; 5) fewer disciplinary points; 6) away goal differential; 7) away goals scored; 8) home goals differential; 9) home goals scored; 10) coin toss (2 clubs tied) or drawing of lots (≥3 clubs tied)

==== Results summary ====
Overall								Home						Away					
Pld	W	D	L	GF	GA	GD	Pts	W	D	L	GF	GA	GD	W	D	L	GF	GA	GD
28	4	6	18	37	59	−22	18	4	5	5	23	26	−3	0	1	13	14	33	−19

Source: MLS NEXT Pro

==== Results by round ====
Round	1	2	3	4	5	6	7	8	9	10	11	12	13	14	15	16	17	18	19	20	21	22	23	24	25	26	27	28
Stadium	A	H	A	A	A	H	H	A	H	H	A	A	H	H	A	H	H	A	A	H	A	A	H	H	A	H	A	H
Result	L	W	L	L	SW	W	W	L	L	SW	L	L	W	L	L	L	L	L	L	SL	L	L	SW	SW	L	SL	L	L
Position (East)	14	9	10	11	10	9	7	7	12	12	12	12	10	11	-	-	-	14	14	14	15	15	15	15	15	15	15	15

A = Away; H = Home; W = Win; L = Loss; SL = Shootout Loss; SW = Shootout Win

==== Match results ====
March 24, 2024 1	Philadelphia Union II	2-1	New England Revolution II	Chester, Pennsylvania
3:00 PM EDT	Barry 33' (o.g.); Olivas 81'	Report	Monis 9'; Souza (yellow card) 90+1'	Stadium: Subaru Park; Referee: Olvin Oliva

March 31, 2024 2	New England Revolution II	2-1	Carolina Core FC	Foxborough, Massachusetts
3:00 PM EDT	Fry 3'; Quiñones (yellow card) 20'; Barry (yellow card) 56'; Panayotou 59'; Weinstein (yellow card) 90+8'	Report	Orejuela (yellow card) 25'; Polanco 37'; White (yellow card) 40'; Canete (yellow card) 87'	Stadium: Gillette Stadium; Referee: John Matto

April 10, 2024 3	FC Cincinnati 2	2-1	New England Revolution II	Highland Heights, Kentucky
6:00 PM EDT	Daley 19', 39'	Report	Dias 4'	Stadium: NKU Soccer Stadium; Referee: Eric Tattersall

April 14, 2024 4	New York City FC II	6-2	New England Revolution II	New York City, New York
7:30 PM EDT	Jimenez 11', 16'; Carrizo 33'; Calheira 72'; Shore 79'; Arevalo (penalty scored) 86	Report	Panayotou 8'; Diarbian 67'	Stadium: Belson Stadium; Referee: Izlen Peksenar

April 19, 2024 5	Toronto FC II	1-1 (4–5 SO)	New England Revolution II	Toronto, Ontario
7:00 PM EDT	Staniland (yellow card) 2'; Altobelli 7'; Edwards (yellow card) 39'	Report	Barry (yellow card) 24'; Dias 45+1'	Stadium: York Lions Stadium

April 28, 2024 6	New England Revolution II	3-1	Inter Miami CF II	Hooksett, New Hampshire
3:00 PM EDT	Leal 20'; Diarbian 30'; Panayotou 44'; Suarez (yellow card) 74'; Souza (red card) 79'; Maciel (yellow card) 87'; Bjelajac (yellow card) 90+5'	Report	Bright 54'; De La Paz (yellow card) 41'; Boatwright (yellow card) 90+5'	Stadium: Mark A Ouellette Stadium; Referee: Melinda Sopka

May 4, 2024 7	New England Revolution II	3-2	Chicago Fire FC II	Foxborough, Massachusetts
1:00 PM EDT	Monis 40', 54'; Maciel (yellow card) 46'; Dias (penalty scored) 90+5'	Report	Konincks 66'; Soudan 87'; Blake (yellow card) 90+4'	Stadium: Gillette Stadium; Referee: Stephen Foster

May 8, 2024 8	Crown Legacy FC	2-1	New England Revolution II	Matthews, North Carolina
7:30 PM EDT	Ouedraogo (yellow card) 26'; Duke (yellow card) 39'; Mayaka (yellow card) 41' (yellow-red card) , 57'; John 73'; Nyandjo 78'	Report	Suarez (red card) 43'; Barry (yellow card) 60'; Bolma (yellow card) 69', (goal) 88'; McIntosh (yellow card) 77'; Dias (yellow card) 77'	Stadium: Sportsplex at Matthews; Referee: Emma Richards

May 19, 2024 9	New England Revolution II	1-3	Philadelphia Union II	Hooksett, New Hampshire
3:00 PM EDT	Fry (yellow card) 23'; Monis (yellow card) 56'; Dias 63', (yellow card) 83'	Report	Donovan 47', 76', (yellow card) 77'; Torres (yellow card) 56'; Makhanya 81'	Stadium: Mark A Ouellette Stadium; Referee: Marie Durr

May 26, 2024 10	New England Revolution II	3-3 (4–3 SO)	New York City FC II	Hooksett, New Hampshire
3:00 PM EDT	Dias 23'; Leal (yellow card) 54'; Souza (yellow card) 68'; Butts 80'; Klein (yellow card) 71', (goal) 87'	Report	Tiao 6'; Elias 34'; Owusu (yellow card) 45'; Calheira 52'	Stadium: Mark A Ouellette Stadium; Referee: Alexandra Billeter

June 1, 2024 11	Chattanooga FC	1-0	New England Revolution II	Chattanooga, Tennessee
7:00 PM EDT	Garvanian (yellow card) 43'; Ouamri 80', (yellow card) 90+2'; McGrath (yellow card) 86'	Report	Suarez (yellow card) 62' (yellow-red card) , 73'	Stadium: Finley Stadium; Attendance: 2,469; Referee: Wes Caouette

June 6, 2024 12	Columbus Crew 2	3-1	New England Revolution II	Columbus, Ohio
6:00 PM EDT	Da 41'; Adams 48'; Rayo (yellow card) 87'	Report	Borovic (yellow card) 50'; Maciel (yellow card) 53'; Gunn 65' (o.g.); Leal 81'; Chavez (yellow card) 86'	Stadium: Lower.com Field; Referee: Shawn Tehini

June 13, 2024 13	New England Revolution II	1-0	New York Red Bulls II	Hooksett, New Hampshire
7:00 PM EDT	Maciel 40'; Revolution Bench (yellow card) 60'; Quiñones (yellow card) 90'	Report	Alexandre (yellow card) 49'; Gutierrez Ruiz (yellow card) 55'; Red Bulls Bench (yellow card) 63'; Jarvis (yellow card) 90+1'; Mosquera Diaz (yellow card) 90+1'	Stadium: Mark A Ouellette Stadium; Referee: Thomas Snyder

June 23, 2024 14	New England Revolution II	3-5	Crown Legacy FC	Hooksett, New Hampshire
6:00 PM EDT	Monis 64', 86'; Maciel (yellow card) 78'; Suarez 82'	Report	John 4'; Bravo 14'; Forbes 24', 38'; Sing 30'; Neeley (red card) 80'; Markovic (yellow card) 89'	Stadium: Mark A Ouellette Stadium; Referee: Stephen Foster

June 30, 2024 15	FC Cincinnati 2	0-1	New England Revolution II	Highland Heights, Kentucky
6:00 PM EDT	Mboma Dem 34'; Schaefer (yellow card) 57'	Report	Maciel (yellow card) 90+2'	Stadium: NKU Soccer Stadium; Referee: Alex Beehler

July 6, 2024 16	New England Revolution II	1-2	Philadelphia Union II	Hooksett, New Hampshire
6:00 PM EDT	33' (o.g.); Escobar (yellow card) 37'; Leal 49'; Monis (yellow card) 69'	Report	Sullivan 19'; Pierre (yellow card) 29'	Stadium: Mark A Ouellette Stadium; Referee: Melinda Homa

July 10, 2024 17	New England Revolution II	1-2	Huntsville City FC	Foxborough, Massachusetts
11:00 AM EDT	Leal 37'; Escobar (yellow card) 42'; McIntosh (yellow card) 50'; Monis (yellow card) 55'	Report	Perkins (yellow card) 69'; Bolanos 33'; Pacius 47'; O’Brien (red card) 51'	Stadium: Gillette Stadium; Referee: Katherine McCormick

July 21, 2024 18	Chicago Fire FC II	3-2	New England Revolution II	Bridgeview, Illinois
5:00 PM EDT	Rochester 17'; Shokalook 20'; Poreba (penalty scored) 26'	Report	Monis (penalty scored) 13'; Shannon 22' (o.g.); Calderón (yellow card) 25'; Leal (yellow card) 43'; Klein (yellow card) 50'; Suarez (yellow card) 65'; Bolma (yellow card) 79'	Stadium: SeatGeek Stadium; Referee: Justin St. Pierre

August 4, 2024 19	Atlanta United 2	3-2	New England Revolution II	Kennesaw, Georgia
7:30 PM EDT	Tmimi 13'; Centeno (yellow card) 21'; Carleton 36', 38'	Report	Butts 48'; Monis 69'	Stadium: Fifth Third Bank Stadium; Referee: Alejo Calume

August 7, 2024 20	New England Revolution II	0-0 (5–6 SO)	FC Cincinnati 2	Foxborough, Massachusetts
11:00 AM EDT	Calderón (yellow card) 5'; Bolma (yellow card) 26'; Borovic (yellow card) 80'	Report	Ramos (yellow card) 33'	Stadium: Gillette Stadium; Referee: Matt Thompson

August 18, 2024 21	Columbus Crew 2	2-1	New England Revolution II	Columbus, Ohio
6:00 PM EDT	Mrowka 11'; Adams (yellow card) 18'	Report	Dias 19'; 75' (o.g.); Mussenden (yellow card) 77'; Suarez (yellow card) 79'	Stadium: Historic Crew Stadium; Referee: Muhammad Hassan

August 24, 2024 22	Carolina Core FC	2-1	New England Revolution II	High Point, North Carolina
7:30 PM EDT	Canete 85', 90+1'	Report	Mussenden (yellow card) 8' (yellow-red card) , 21'; Monis 16'; Klein (yellow card) 36'; Panayotou (yellow card) 75'	Stadium: Truist Point; Attendance: 4,011; Referee: Emma Richards

August 31, 2024 23	New England Revolution II	1-1 (4–2 SO)	Chicago Fire FC II	Foxborough, Massachusetts
6:00 PM EDT	Dias 19'; Kinner (red card) 80'	Report	Glasgow 3', (yellow card) 41'; Nagle (yellow card) 26'; Diouf (yellow card) 85' (yellow-red card) , 90+2'	Stadium: Gillette Stadium; Referee: Emma Richards

September 8, 2024 24	New England Revolution II	2-2 (6–5 SO)	Toronto FC II	Hooksett, New Hampshire
4:00 PM EDT	Dias 41', 48'	Report	Altobelli (penalty scored) 8'; Edwards (yellow card) 75'; Staniland 78'; Pearlman (yellow card) 90+2'	Stadium: Mark A Ouellette Stadium; Referee: Johnathan Luk

September 15, 2024 25	Orlando City B	2-0	New England Revolution II	Kissimmee, Florida
5:00 PM EDT	Freeman 49'; Lynn 61'; Solis (yellow card) 62'; Banguero (yellow card) 90+1'	Report	McIntosh (yellow card) 21'; Diarbian (yellow card) 30'; Fry (yellow card) 52'	Stadium: Osceola County Stadium; Referee: Alejo Calume

September 21, 2024 26	New England Revolution II	1-1 (4–5 SO)	Chattanooga FC	Foxborough, Massachusetts
3:00 PM EDT	Butts 45+2'; Klein (yellow card) 58'	Report	Kwak 18'; McGrath (yellow card) 50'; Ibarra (yellow card) 80'	Stadium: Gillette Stadium; Referee: Melinda Homa

September 29, 2024 27	New York Red Bulls II	3-1	New England Revolution II	Montclair, New Jersey
5:00 PM EDT	Sofo 38'; Jarvis (yellow card) 46'; Kasule 49'; Rosborough 56'; Sullivan (yellow card) 64'	Report	Butts 44'; Suárez (red card) 45+2'; Fry (yellow card) 75'	Stadium: MSU Soccer Park at Pittser Field; Referee: Kyle Johnston

October 6, 2024 28	New England Revolution II	1-3	Columbus Crew 2	Hooksett, New Hampshire
1:00 PM EDT	Escobar (yellow card) 10'; Butts 35'	Report	Adu-Gyamfi (yellow card) 25'; Da 29', 62'; Keita 73'; Gonzalez (yellow card) 90+3'	Stadium: Mark A Ouellette Stadium; Referee: Wes Caouette

== Statistics ==
=== Top scorers ===
Rank	Position	No.	Name	MLSNP
1	FW	39	(Brazil) Marcos Dias	9
2	MF	4	(United States) Alex Monis	8
3	FW	9	(United States) Liam Butts	5
3	MF	17	(United States) Patrick Leal	4
4	MF	32	(United States) Jack Panayotou	3
5	FW	11	(United States) Gevork Diarbian	2
7	FW	22	(United States) Malcolm Fry	1
7	MF	31	(United States) Eric Klein	1
7	MF	16	(United States) Joshua Bolma	1
7	MF	13	(United States) Maciel	1
7	DF	43	(United States) (Uruguay) Santiago Suárez	1
12			own goal	1
Total				37

== See also ==
- 2024 New England Revolution season
