= 2023 MLS Next Pro season =

2nd season of MLS Next Pro

MLS Next Pro
- Season: 2023
- Dates: March 24 – September 24 (regular season)
- Champions: Austin FC II (1st Title)
- Regular season title: Colorado Rapids 2 (1st Title)
- Matches: 391 (378 RS, 13 PO)
- Goals: 1,331 (3.4 per match) (1296 RS, 35 PO)
- Best player: (United States) Jack Lynn (Orlando City B)
- Top goalscorer: (France) Rémi Cabral (Colorado Rapids 2) (United States) Jack Lynn (Orlando City B) (United States) MD Myers (New York City FC II) (19 goals each)
- Best goalkeeper: (United States) Damian Las (Austin FC II)
- Biggest home win: SK2 7–1 WFC (July 2)
- Biggest away win: LAG 0–5 CR2 (May 7); CC2 0–5 NYR (August 13); MIA 0–5 CC2 (September 3)
- Highest scoring: NE2 5–5 CIN (April 30)
- Longest winning run: 11 CR2
- Highest attendance: 9,626; STL2 4–1 LAG (September 17)
- All statistics correct as of October 22, 2023.

The 2023 MLS Next Pro season was the second season of MLS Next Pro, the reserve league of Major League Soccer. It featured 27 clubs—an increase of six from the inaugural 2022 season. Atlanta United 2, New York Red Bulls II and LA Galaxy II joined the league from the USL Championship. The expansion teams include Austin FC II (representing Austin FC), Crown Legacy FC (Charlotte FC), Huntsville City FC (Nashville SC), and Los Angeles FC 2 (Los Angeles FC). Rochester New York FC withdrew. The regular season ran from March 24 to September 24.

== Teams ==
=== Stadiums and locations ===
Team	Stadium	Capacity
Atlanta United 2	Fifth Third Bank Stadium	8,318
Austin FC II	Parmer Field	1,000
Chicago Fire FC II	SeatGeek Stadium	20,000
FC Cincinnati 2	NKU Soccer Stadium	1,000
Colorado Rapids 2	Denver Soccer Stadium	2,000
Columbus Crew 2	Historic Crew Stadium	19,968
Crown Legacy FC	Sportsplex at Matthews	5,000
Houston Dynamo 2	SaberCats Stadium	3,200
Huntsville City FC	Joe W. Davis Stadium	6,000
Inter Miami CF II	DRV PNK Stadium	18,000
LA Galaxy II	Dignity Health Sports Park Track & Field Stadium	2,000
Los Angeles FC 2	Titan Stadium	10,000
Minnesota United FC 2	Allianz Field	19,600
Minnesota United FC 2	National Sports Center	5,500
New England Revolution II	Gillette Stadium	20,000
New York City FC II	Belson Stadium	2,168
New York Red Bulls II	MSU Soccer Park at Pittser Field	5,000
North Texas SC	Choctaw Stadium	48,114
Orlando City B	Osceola County Stadium	5,300
Philadelphia Union II	Subaru Park	18,500
Portland Timbers 2	Providence Park	25,218
Real Monarchs	Zions Bank Stadium	5,000
San Jose Earthquakes II	PayPal Park	18,000
Sporting Kansas City II	Rock Chalk Park	2,500
Sporting Kansas City II	Swope Soccer Village	1,500
St. Louis City 2	CityPark	22,423
Toronto FC II	York Lions Stadium	4,000
Tacoma Defiance	Starfire Sports Complex	4,500
Whitecaps FC 2	Swangard Stadium	5,288

=== Personnel and sponsorship ===
Note: All teams use Adidas as universal kit manufacturer.

Team	Head coach
Atlanta United 2	(England) Steve Cooke
Austin FC II	(United States) Brett Uttley
Chicago Fire FC II	(France) Ludovic Taillandier
FC Cincinnati 2	(Jamaica) Tyrone Marshall
Colorado Rapids 2	(United States) Erik Bushey
Columbus Crew 2	(France) Laurent Courtois
Crown Legacy FC	(Portugal) José Tavares
Houston Dynamo 2	(United States) Kenny Bundy
Huntsville City FC	(Wales) Jack Collison
Inter Miami CF II	(Argentina) Federico Higuaín
LA Galaxy II	(Brazil) Marcelo Sarvas
Los Angeles FC 2	(Spain) Enrique Duran
Minnesota United FC 2	(New Zealand) Cameron Knowles
New England Revolution II	(United States) Clint Peay
New York City FC II	(United States) Matt Pilkington
New York Red Bulls II	(Uganda) Ibrahim Sekagya
North Texas SC	(Spain) Javier Cano
Orlando City B	(Argentina) Martín Perelman
Philadelphia Union II	(United States) Marlon LeBlanc
Portland Timbers 2	(Scotland) Shannon Murray
Real Monarchs	(Colombia) Jámison Olave
San Jose Earthquakes II	(United States) Dan DeGeer
Sporting Kansas City II	(United States) Benny Feilhaber
St. Louis City 2	(United States) Bobby Murphy
Toronto FC II	(Canada) Gianni Cimini
Tacoma Defiance	(United States) Wade Webber
Whitecaps FC 2	(United States) Ricardo Clark

== Regular season ==
During the regular season, teams played 28 matches each in a mostly regionalized schedule. Each conference was divided into divisions of six or seven teams for scheduling.

=== Conference standings ===
==== Eastern Conference ====
Pos	Div	Team	Pld	W	SOW	SOL	L	GF	GA	GD	Pts	Qualification
1	NE	Crown Legacy FC	28	19	4	1	4	60	34	+26	66	Qualification for the Conference semifinals
2	NE	New England Revolution II	28	14	6	2	6	57	41	+16	56	Qualification for the Playoffs
3	CT	Columbus Crew 2	28	16	3	0	9	58	46	+12	54	Qualification for the Playoffs
4	NE	New York Red Bulls II	28	14	3	3	8	53	36	+17	51	Qualification for the Playoffs
5	CT	Orlando City B	28	13	2	3	10	59	61	−2	46	Qualification for the Playoffs
6	CT	Chicago Fire FC II	28	9	5	6	8	54	46	+8	43	Qualification for the Playoffs
7	NE	Philadelphia Union II	28	12	2	2	12	54	57	−3	42	Qualification for the Playoffs
8	NE	New York City FC II	28	12	1	3	12	60	55	+5	41	
9	CT	Huntsville City FC	28	9	4	3	12	48	45	+3	38	
10	CT	Atlanta United 2	28	9	2	4	13	50	52	−2	35	
11	NE	Toronto FC II	28	6	3	5	14	43	57	−14	29	
12	CT	FC Cincinnati 2	28	7	2	2	17	37	65	−28	27	
13	CT	Inter Miami CF II	28	5	1	5	17	34	68	−34	22	

Source: MLSNP Eastern Conference
Rules for classification: 1) points; 2) total wins; 3) total goal differential; 4) total goals scored; 5) fewer disciplinary points; 6) away goal differential; 7) away goals scored; 8) home goals differential; 9) home goals scored; 10) coin toss (2 clubs tied) or drawing of lots (≥3 clubs tied)

==== Western Conference ====
Pos	Div	Team	Pld	W	SOW	SOL	L	GF	GA	GD	Pts	Qualification
1	FR	Colorado Rapids 2	28	19	4	1	4	70	37	+33	66	Qualification for the Conference semifinals
2	PC	Tacoma Defiance	28	14	6	3	5	54	33	+21	57	Qualification for the Playoffs
3	FR	Sporting Kansas City II	28	13	4	2	9	59	41	+18	49	Qualification for the Playoffs
4	FR	Austin FC II	28	12	4	5	7	40	23	+17	49	Qualification for the Playoffs
5	FR	St. Louis City 2	28	11	5	4	8	49	39	+10	47	Qualification for the Playoffs
6	PC	San Jose Earthquakes II	28	11	5	2	10	41	36	+5	45	Qualification for the Playoffs
7	FR	Houston Dynamo 2	28	12	3	1	12	50	44	+6	43	Qualification for the Playoffs
8	FR	Minnesota United FC 2	28	10	5	3	10	50	52	−2	43	
9	FR	North Texas SC	28	9	1	7	11	43	45	−2	36	
10	PC	Portland Timbers 2	28	11	0	1	16	40	63	−23	34	
11	PC	Whitecaps FC 2	28	8	3	4	13	33	46	−13	34	
12	PC	Real Monarchs	28	8	2	3	15	27	54	−27	31	
13	PC	Los Angeles FC 2	28	6	0	7	15	30	39	−9	25	
14	PC	LA Galaxy II	28	5	4	2	17	36	74	−38	25	

Source: MLSNP Western Conference
Rules for classification: 1) points; 2) total wins; 3) total goal differential; 4) total goals scored; 5) fewer disciplinary points; 6) away goal differential; 7) away goals scored; 8) home goals differential; 9) home goals scored; 10) coin toss (2 clubs tied) or drawing of lots (≥3 clubs tied)

==== Overall table ====
Pos	Team	Pld	W	SOW	SOL	L	GF	GA	GD	Pts	Awards
1	Colorado Rapids 2	28	19	4	1	4	70	37	+33	66	Regular season champion and U.S. Open Cup First Round
2	Crown Legacy FC	28	19	4	1	4	60	34	+26	66	U.S. Open Cup First Round
3	Tacoma Defiance	28	14	6	3	5	57	36	+21	57	
4	New England Revolution II	28	14	6	2	6	57	41	+16	56	
5	Columbus Crew 2	28	16	3	0	9	58	46	+12	54	
6	New York Red Bulls II	28	14	3	3	8	53	36	+17	51	U.S. Open Cup First Round
7	Sporting Kansas City II	28	13	4	2	9	60	42	+18	49	U.S. Open Cup First Round
8	Austin FC II	28	12	4	5	7	40	23	+17	49	
9	St. Louis City 2	28	11	5	4	8	49	39	+10	47	
10	Orlando City B	28	13	2	3	10	59	61	−2	46	
11	San Jose Earthquakes II	28	11	5	2	10	41	36	+5	45	
12	Houston Dynamo 2	28	12	3	1	12	50	44	+6	43	
13	Minnesota United FC 2	28	10	5	3	10	50	52	−2	43	U.S. Open Cup First Round
14	Chicago Fire FC II	28	9	5	6	8	54	46	+8	43	U.S. Open Cup First Round
15	Philadelphia Union II	28	12	2	2	12	54	57	−3	42	
16	New York City FC II	28	12	1	3	12	60	55	+5	41	U.S. Open Cup First Round
17	Huntsville City FC	28	9	4	3	12	48	45	+3	38	
18	North Texas SC	28	9	1	7	11	43	45	−2	36	
19	Atlanta United 2	28	9	2	4	13	50	52	−2	35	
20	Portland Timbers 2	28	11	0	1	16	40	63	−23	34	U.S. Open Cup First Round
21	Whitecaps FC 2	28	8	3	4	13	36	49	−13	34	
22	Real Monarchs	28	8	2	3	15	27	54	−27	31	
23	Toronto FC II	28	6	3	5	14	43	57	−14	29	
24	FC Cincinnati 2	28	7	2	2	17	37	65	−28	27	
25	Los Angeles FC 2	28	6	0	7	15	30	39	−9	25	
26	LA Galaxy II	28	5	4	2	17	36	74	−38	25	U.S. Open Cup First Round
27	Inter Miami CF II	28	5	1	5	17	34	68	−34	22	

Source: MLSNP
Rules for classification: 1) points; 2) total wins; 3) total goal differential; 4) total goals scored; 5) fewer disciplinary points; 6) away goal differential; 7) away goals scored; 8) home goals differential; 9) home goals scored; 10) coin toss (2 clubs tied) or drawing of lots (≥3 clubs tied)

== Player statistics ==
As of September 24, 2023

=== Goals ===
Rank	Player	Club	Goals
1	(France) Rémi Cabral	Colorado Rapids 2	19
1	(United States) Jack Lynn	Orlando City B	19
1	(United States) MD Myers	New York City FC II	19
4	(Brazil) Nicolas Firmino	Atlanta United 2	16
5	(Uganda) Ibrahim Kasule	New York Red Bulls II	15
5	(Guinea-Bissau) Braudílio Rodrigues	Tacoma Defiance	15
7	(Cameroon) Aaron Bibout	LA Galaxy II	14
7	(Senegal) Papa Ndoye	Houston Dynamo 2	14
9	(Japan) Yosuke Hanya	Colorado Rapids 2	13
9	(United States) John Klein	St. Louis City 2	13

=== Hat-tricks ===
Player	For	Against	Score	Date
(Cameroon) Aaron Bibout	LA Galaxy II	Whitecaps FC 2	3–4 (A)	April 16
(Bosnia and Herzegovina) Esmir Bajraktarevic	New England Revolution II	Philadelphia Union II	3–4 (A)	May 21
(United States) Jeremy Rafanello	Philadelphia Union II	Columbus Crew 2	3–2 (H)	May 28
(Senegal) Papa Ndoye	Houston Dynamo 2	Real Monarchs	3–5 (A)	July 28
(Senegal) Papa Ndoye	Houston Dynamo 2	Sporting Kansas City II	3–1 (H)	August 6
(Guinea-Bissau) Braudílio Rodrigues	Tacoma Defiance	Sporting Kansas City II	3–1 (H)	August 9
(United States) Diego Gutierrez	Portland Timbers 2	LA Galaxy II	6–1 (H)	August 9
(United States) MD Myers	New York City FC II	Inter Miami CF II	5–0 (H)	August 10
(Honduras) Alenis Vargas	Sporting Kansas City II	Portland Timbers 2	6–1 (H)	August 13
(United States) Azaad Liadi	Huntsville City FC	Philadelphia Union II	5–2 (H)	August 19
(United States) Gibran Rayo	Columbus Crew 2	Inter Miami CF II	0–5 (A)	September 3
(England) Faysal Bettache	St. Louis City 2	Houston Dynamo 2	1–3 (A)	September 3
(Mexico) Leonardo Flores	Los Angeles FC 2	Portland Timbers 2	4–0 (H)	September 15
(France) Rémi Cabral	Colorado Rapids 2	Minnesota United FC 2	4–2 (H)	September 24

Notes

(H) – Home team
(A) – Away team

=== Assists ===
Rank	Player	Club	Assists
1	(United States) Marlon Vargas	Colorado Rapids 2	10
2	(Japan) Yosuke Hanya	Colorado Rapids 2	9
3	(United States) Josh Coan	Sporting Kansas City II	8
3	(United States) Oliver Larraz	Colorado Rapids 2	8
3	(United States) Chris Olney	Philadelphia Union II	8
6	(Mexico) Jonathan Jiménez	New York City FC 2	7
6	(Germany) Max Schneider	St. Louis City 2	7
8	(United States) Jordan Adebayo-Smith	New England Revolution II	6
8	(Portugal) Diogo Pacheco	Minnesota United FC 2	6
8	(France) Kemy Amiche	Huntsville City FC	6
8	(United States) Noah Fuson	Columbus Crew 2	6
8	(United States) Luka Prpa	Chicago Fire FC II	6
8	(Guyana) Omari Glasgow	Chicago Fire FC II	6
8	(Mexico) Adrián González	LA Galaxy II	6
8	(Colombia) Jhon Solís	Orlando City B	6
8	(United States) Isaiah LeFlore	Houston Dynamo 2	6
8	(England) Ollie Wright	Huntsville City FC	6
8	(United States) Tyshawn Rose	North Texas SC	6

=== Clean sheets ===
Rank	Player	Club	Clean sheets
1	(United States) Damian Las	Austin FC II	13
2	(United States) AJ Marcucci	New York Red Bulls II	7
3	(United States) Brady Scott	Columbus Crew 2	6
4	(United States) Isaac Walker	Crown Legacy FC	5
4	(Belarus) Stanislav Lapkes	Columbus Crew 2	5
6	(Mexico) Fernando Delgado	Real Monarchs	4
6	(United States) Antonio Carrera	North Texas SC	4
6	(United States) Eric De La Cerda	San Jose Earthquakes II	4
6	(Spain) Nico Campuzano	New England Revolution II	4
6	(United States) Alex Rando	New York City FC II	4
6	(United States) Jeffrey Gal	Chicago Fire FC II	4
6	(United States) Abraham Rodriguez	Colorado Rapids 2	4
6	(Chile) Vicente Reyes	Atlanta United 2	4
6	(Mexico) Emmanuel Ochoa	San Jose Earthquakes II	4

== Playoffs ==
=== Format ===
Top seven teams in each conference qualified for the playoffs, with the best record in each conference earning a first round bye. The second and third seeds in each conference were able to choose which of the remaining teams they would play. The top seed in the conference semifinals were also allowed to choose their opponent from the remaining teams.

=== Bracket ===
Conference Quarterfinals; September 29–October 1	Conference Semifinals; October 6–8
E1	Crown Legacy FC	0
E3	Columbus Crew 2	1
E3	Columbus Crew 2	2
E5	Orlando City B	1
Eastern Conference
E2	New England Revolution II	3
E7	Philadelphia Union II	2
E2	New England Revolution II	2
E4	New York Red Bulls II	1
E4	New York Red Bulls II	4
E6	Chicago Fire FC II	1
W1	Colorado Rapids 2	1
W6	San Jose Earthquakes II	0
W5	St. Louis City 2	0
W6	San Jose Earthquakes II	2
Western Conference
W2	Tacoma Defiance	4
W7	Houston Dynamo 2	3
W2	Tacoma Defiance	0
W4	Austin FC II	1
W3	Sporting Kansas City II	0
W4	Austin FC II	2

Conference Finals; October 14–15
E3	Columbus Crew 2	1
E2	New England Revolution II	0
W1	Colorado Rapids 2	0 (1)
W4	Austin FC II (p)	0 (4)

MLS Next Pro Final; October 22
E3	Columbus Crew 2	1
W4	Austin FC II	3

=== Conference Quarterfinals ===
==== Eastern Conference ====
October 1
1:00 PM EDT

New York Red Bulls II	4–1	Chicago Fire FC II
Ssebuufu 13'; Mullings 25'; Kasule 45', 90+6'; Valencia (yellow card) 49'; Nocita (yellow card) 55'; Cabezas (yellow card) 64'	Report	Prpa 56'

MSU Soccer Park at Pittser Field, Montclair, New Jersey
Referee: Anya Voigt

October 1
5:30 PM EDT

Columbus Crew 2	2–1	Orlando City B
Fuson 33' (yellow card) 47'; Rayo (yellow card) 55' (red card) 90'; Micaletto (yellow card) 58' (goal) 90+1'; Knight (yellow card) 66'	Report	Williams (yellow card) 30'; Pérez 37'; Juninho (yellow card) 45+2'; Kibunguchy (yellow card) 82'; Acuña (red card) 90'; Otero (yellow card) 90+1' (red card) 90+4'

Historic Crew Stadium, Columbus, Ohio
Referee: Abdou Ndiaye

October 1
8:00 PM EDT

New England Revolution II	3–2	Philadelphia Union II
Dias 26' (pen.); Bajraktarevic 55', 64'	Report	Castillo 78' (yellow card) 90+4'; Diallo 82' (pen.)

Gillette Stadium, Foxborough, Massachusetts
Referee: Gerald Flores

==== Western Conference ====
September 29
7:00 PM CDT

Sporting Kansas City II	0–2	Austin FC II
Mekideche (yellow card) 32'	Report	Pineau (yellow card) 44'; Rodríguez 52'; Touré (yellow card) 54'; Ramírez 86'; Las (yellow card) 90+3'

Rock Chalk Park, Lawrence, Kansas
Referee: Brandon Stevis

October 1
5:00 PM CDT

St. Louis City 2	0–2	San Jose Earthquakes II
Wentzel (yellow card) 12'; Armstrong (yellow card) 28'; Palazzolo (yellow card) 83'	Report	Bouda (yellow card) 34' (goal) 87'; Richmond 63'; Blancas (yellow card) 86'

CITYPARK, St. Louis, Missouri
Attendance: 5,227
Referee: Alexandra Billeter

October 1
7:00 PM PDT

Tacoma Defiance	4–3	Houston Dynamo 2
Bowen 3'; Rodrigues 13', 19'; Ovalle (yellow card) 44'; Teves 53'	Report	Juarez (yellow card) 18'; Evans 31'; Lampman (yellow card) 72'; Gonzalez 79'; LeFlore 81'

Starfire Sports Complex, Tukwila, Washington
Referee: Nabil Bensalah

=== Conference Semifinals ===
==== Eastern Conference ====
October 6
3:00 PM EDT

New England Revolution II	2–1	New York Red Bulls II
Fry 12'; Cayet (yellow card) 35'; Rozhansky (yellow card) 56'; Souza 69'	Report	Shapiro-Thompson (yellow card) 30'; Berkley (yellow card) 41'; Valencia (yellow card) 68'; Hall 72'; Nocita (yellow card) 80'

Gillette Stadium, Foxborough, Massachusetts
Referee: Abdou Ndiaye

October 8
3:00 PM EDT

Crown Legacy FC	0–1	Columbus Crew 2
Petković (yellow card) 8'; Williams (yellow card) 81'	Report	Rogers (yellow card) 10'; Fuson 50'; Harboune (yellow card) 81'

Sportsplex at Matthews, Matthews, North Carolina
Referee: Adam Kilpatrick

==== Western Conference ====
October 8
7:30pm MDT

Colorado Rapids 2	1–0	San Jose Earthquakes II
Anderson (yellow card) 76'; Travis (yellow card) 83'; Yapi 84'; Rodriguez (yellow card) 90'; Hanya (yellow card) 90+4'	Report	Verhoeven (red card) 2'; Walls (yellow card) 90+3'

Dick's Sporting Goods Park, Commerce City, Colorado
Referee: Joshua Encarnación

October 8
7:30 PM PDT

Tacoma Defiance	0–1	Austin FC II
Rodrigues (yellow card) 61'; Cissoko (red card) 69'; Daroma (yellow card) 74'; Ovalle (yellow card) 89'	Report	Vela (yellow card) 30'; Noël 82'; Ocampo-Chávez (yellow card) 89'

Starfire Sports Complex, Tukwila, Washington
Referee: John Griggs

=== Conference Finals ===
==== Eastern Conference ====
October 14
5:00 PM EDT

New England Revolution II	0–1	Columbus Crew 2
Souza (yellow card) 90+3'	Report	Habroune (yellow card) 12'; Rayo (yellow card) 87' (goal) 90+1'

Gillette Stadium, Foxborough, Massachusetts
Referee: Matthew Thompson

==== Western Conference ====
October 15
7:30 PM MDT

Colorado Rapids 2	0–0 (a.e.t.)	Austin FC II
Larraz (yellow card) 40'; Vargas (yellow card) 65'; Cabral (yellow card) 100'	Report	Hafferty (yellow card) 105+1'; Touré (yellow card) 117'
Penalties
Larraz (penalty missed); Hanya (penalty scored); Yapi (penalty missed)	1–4	(penalty scored) Noël; (penalty scored) Hafferty; (penalty scored) Ramírez; (penalty scored) Santillan

Dick's Sporting Goods Park, Commerce City, Colorado
Referee: Alexis Da Silva

=== 2023 MLS Next Pro Cup Final ===
October 22
5:00 PM EDT

Columbus Crew 2	1–3	Austin FC II
Roberts 49' (pen.); Micaletto (yellow card) 63'; Fuson (yellow card) 90+4'	Report	Ramírez 70' (pen.); Noël 77'; Almeida 80' (o.g.)

Lower.com Field, Columbus, Ohio
Attendance: 7,500
Referee: Calin Radosav

Most Valuable Player: (France) Valentin Noël (Austin FC II)

== League awards ==
=== Individual awards ===
Award	Winner	Team	Reason	Ref.
Golden Boot	(France) Rémi Cabral	Colorado Rapids 2	19 goals	
Golden Boot	(United States) Jack Lynn	Orlando City B	19 goals	
Golden Boot	(United States) MD Myers	New York City FC II	19 goals	
Goalkeeper of the Year	(United States) Damian Las	Austin FC II	12 clean sheets; 0.74 Goals Against Average	
Coach of the Year	(United States) Erik Bushey	Colorado Rapids 2	Lead team to the Regular Season title	
Most Valuable Player	(United States) Jack Lynn	Orlando City B	19 goals; Best XI	

=== MLS Next Pro Best XI ===
Goalkeeper	Defenders	Midfielders	Forwards	Ref
(United States) Damian Las (AU2) (Goalkeeper of the Year)	(France) Abdoulaye Cissoko (TAC) (United States) Joe Hafferty (AU2) (Brazil) João Pedro (CRN)	(Brazil) Nicolas Firmino (AT2) (Japan) Yosuke Hanya (CR2) (Uganda) Ibrahim Kasule (NYR) (United States) Oliver Larraz (CR2)	(France) Rémi Cabral (CR2) (Co-Golden Boot) (United States) Jack Lynn (OCB) (Co-Golden Boot and MVP) (United States) MD Myers (NY2) (Co-Golden Boot)	

=== Weekly awards ===
Week	Player of the Matchday				Rising Star of the Matchday				Team of the Matchday	Goal of the Matchday		Ref.
Week	Player	Club	Position	Reason	Player	Club	Position	Reason	Team of the Matchday	Player	Club	Ref.
1	(Guatemala) Arquimides Ordóñez	FC Cincinnati 2	Forward	2 goals vs Toronto	(United States) Leo Conneh	Minnesota United FC 2	Midfielder	1 Goal, 1 Assist in his debut	Minnesota United FC 2	(United States) Azaad Liadi	Huntsville City FC	
2	(United States) Brandon Cambridge	Crown Legacy FC	Forward	2 goals vs Cincinnati	(United States) Ryder Mills	FC Cincinnati 2	Midfielder	First Goal vs Crown Legacy FC in Debut	Colorado Rapids 2	(United States) Cameron Dunbar	Minnesota United FC 2	
3	(Chile) Favian Loyola	Orlando City B	Midfielder	1 goal, 1 assist vs Miami	(United States) Nicholas Nobles	Real Monarchs	Defender	completed 82% of his passes (28/34) and helped Monarchs hold Quakes II to only four shots on goal	New England Revolution II	(England) Ollie Wright	Huntsville City FC	
4	(Cameroon) Aaron Bibout	LA Galaxy II	Forward	Hat trick vs Vancouver	(United States) David Vazquez	Philadelphia Union II	Midfielder	scored MLS Next Pro's 1,000th Goal vs Chicago	Austin FC II	(Brazil) Lucas Rosa	Sporting Kansas City II	
5	(United States) Ryan Bilichuk	Portland Timbers 2	Goalkeeper	Shutout vs LAFC2	(United States) Cesar Abadia-Reda	Inter Miami CF II	Defender	scored a goal less than 20 seconds after subbing into the match vs Huntsville	Whitecaps FC 2	(United States) Selmir Miscic	Portland Timbers 2	
6	(Japan) Yosuke Hanya	Colorado Rapids 2	Midfielder	Game-winning goal vs North Texas SC	(Philippines) Cole Mrowka	Columbus Crew 2	Midfielder	1 goal and 1 assist vs Inter Miami II	Real Monarchs	(Philippines) Cole Mrowka	Columbus Crew 2	
7	(Haiti) Nelson Pierre	Philadelphia Union II	Forward	2 goals vs Red Bulls II	(United States) Daniel Garcia	Colorado Rapids 2	Defender	scoring his first goal of the season within five minutes of coming on as a substitute vs LA Galaxy II	Toronto FC II	(Italy) Marco Micaletto	Columbus Crew 2	
8	(Guatemala) Damian Rivera	New England Revolution II	Midfielder	2 goals vs Toronto	(United States) Gio De Libera	Columbus Crew 2	Midfielder	Scored 1 goal and 1 assist in debut vs Orlando	Portland Timbers 2	(Laos) Michael Vang	Portland Timbers 2	
9	(Bosnia and Herzegovina) Esmir Bajraktarevic	New England Revolution II	Midfielder	Hat trick vs Philadelphia	(United States) Diego Hernandez	North Texas SC	Midfielder	Scored his first goal less than ten minutes after subbing into the match vs Houston Dynamo 2	Huntsville City FC	(Canada) Kamron Habibullah	Whitecaps FC 2	
10	(United States) Jeremy Rafanello	Philadelphia Union II	Forward	Hat Trick vs Columbus Crew 2	(United States) Alexander Yagudayev	New York City FC II	Goalkeeper	9 saves in 2 games	New England Revolution II	(France) Rémi Cabral	Colorado Rapids 2	
11	(Brazil) Nicolas Firmino	Atlanta United 2	Midfielder	2 goals vs Inter Miami	(United States) Anthony Ramirez	North Texas SC	Midfielder	Scored 2 goals within a span of six minutes vs LA Galaxy II	New York Red Bulls II	(United States) Isaiah Parente	Columbus Crew 2	
12	(France) Kemy Amiche	Huntsville City FC	Midfielder	2 goals and 1 assist vs St. Louis	(United States) Chris Olney	Philadelphia Union II	Midfielder	Game winning goal vs Atlanta	Orlando City B	(Mexico) Alex Alcalá	LA Galaxy II	
13	(United States) Victor Bezerra	Chicago Fire FC II	Forward	2 goals; 1 assist vs Philadelphia	(United States) Brent Adu-Gyamfi	Columbus Crew 2	Midfielder	Within 25 minutes, he notched his first-ever professional goal, equalizing the match for a shootout victory vs Atlanta United 2	Austin FC II	(United States) Dida Armstrong	St. Louis City 2	
14	(Brazil) Nicolas Firmino	Atlanta United 2	Midfielder	2 goals vs NYCFC II	(Philippines) Cole Mrowka	Columbus Crew 2	Midfielder	Delivered the game winning assist vs Huntsville City FC	Tacoma Defiance	(Canada) Julian Altobelli	Toronto FC II	
15	(Jamaica) Kameron Lacey	Minnesota United FC 2	Forward	Hat Trick vs Portland	(United States) Luciano Sanchez	Philadelphia Union II	Forward	Game winning goal vs NYCFC II	Sporting Kansas City II	(United States) Charlie Ostrem	Chicago Fire FC II	
16	(United States) Patrick Agyemang	Atlanta United 2	Forward	2 goals in 2 minutes vs NYCFC II	(United States) Adam Beaudry	Colorado Rapids 2	Goalkeeper	two saves in the shootout vs Whitecaps FC 2	Huntsville City FC	(Mexico) Christo Vela	Austin FC II	
17	(United States) Oliver Larraz	Colorado Rapids 2	Midfielder	1 goal and 1 assist vs Real Monarchs	(United States) Luciano Sanchez	Philadelphia Union II	Midfielder	game winner vs New York Red Bulls II	Orlando City B	(United States) Jeremy Rafanello	Philadelphia Union II	
18	(United States) Stefan Stojanovic	Philadelphia Union II	Forward	2 goals vs Columbus Crew 2	(Israel) Tamir Ratoviz	Los Angeles FC 2	Midfielder	game-winning goal against Tacoma	Toronto FC II	(United States) Jack Lynn	Orlando City B	
19	(Senegal) Papa Ndoye	Houston Dynamo 2	Forward	Hat Trick vs Real Monarchs	(United States) Nati Clarke	Sporting KC II	Defender	winning nearly half his defensive duels and boasting an impressive 80.8% pass completion rate vs Colorado	Sporting KC II	(United States) John Klein	St. Louis City 2	
20	(Senegal) Papa Ndoye	Houston Dynamo 2	Forward	Back to Back Hat Tricks for first time in MLS Next Pro History	(United States) Francis Westfield	Philadelphia Union II	Defender	first-ever professional goal vs NYCFC II	St. Louis City 2	(Canada) O'Vonte Mullings	New York Red Bulls II	
21	(Guinea-Bissau) Braudilio Rodrigues	Tacoma Defiance	Midfielder	Hat trick in 26 minutes vs Sporting Kansas City II	(Canada) Myles Morgan	Toronto FC II	Forward	Game winner vs New York Red Bulls II	Tacoma Defiance	(Philippines) Alex Monis	Chicago Fire FC II	
22	(Honduras) Alenis Vargas	Sporting Kansas City II	Forward	Hat Trick vs Portland Timbers 2	(United States) Miles Perkovich	Inter Miami CF II	Forward	2 Goals in a tie vs Chicago Fire FC II	Los Angeles FC 2	(United States) Luka Prpa	Chicago Fire FC II	
23	(United States) Azaad Liadi	Huntsville City FC	Midfielder	Hat Trick vs Philadelphia Union II	(United States) Riley Dalgado	LA Galaxy II	Defender	played a full 90+ minutes as a 17 year old	San Jose Earthquakes II	(United States) John Klein	St. Louis City 2	
24	(United States) Antonio Carrera	North Texas SC	Goalkeeper	10 saves in a cleansheet vs Whitecaps FC 2	(United States) Cielo Tschantret	Sporting Kansas City II	Midfielder	Game winning goal fc Austin FC II	Sporting Kansas City II	(Brazil) Lucas Rosa	Sporting Kansas City II	
25	(England) Faysal Bettache	St. Louis City 2	Midfielder	Scored a hat-trick vs Houston Dynamo 2	(United States) William Mackay	Real Monarchs	Goalkeeper	posted a clean sheet that forced five saves and defied the odds against a 1.19xGA projection.	Columbus Crew 2	(England) Faysal Bettache	St. Louis City 2	
26	(El Salvador) Ronald Arevalo	NYCFC II	Forward	2 goals vs Columbus Crew 2 in first half	(United States) Dylan Borso	Chicago Fire FC II	Midfielder	Game winning goal vs Sporting KC II	Atlanta United 2	(Brazil) Lucas Rosa	Sporting Kansas City II	
27	(Mexico) Leonardo Flores	Los Angeles FC 2	Forward	2 penalty goals vs Portland Timbers 2	(United States) Kage Romanshyn Jr.	Minnesota United FC 2	Midfielder	1 goal and 1 Assist vs Sporting Kansas City II	St. Louis City 2	(United States) John Klein	St. Louis City 2	
28	(France) Rémi Cabral	Colorado Rapids 2	Midfielder	Hat Trick that got him a three way share of Golden Boot	(United States) David Vasquez	Philadelphia Union II	Midfielder	Game sealing goal vs New York Red Bulls II	Philadelphia Union II	NA	NA	

=== Monthly awards ===
Week	Player of the Month		Rising Star of the Month		Goalkeeper of the Month		Coach of the Month		Team of the Month	Ref.
April	(Japan) Yosuke Hanya	Colorado Rapids 2	(United States) David Vazquez	Philadelphia Union II	(United States) Damian Las	Austin FC II	(United States) Erik Bushey	Colorado Rapids 2	Crown Legacy FC	
May	(Cape Verde) Iuri Tavares	Crown Legacy FC	(United States) Diego Hernandez	North Texas SC	(United States) Adam Beaudry	Colorado Rapids 2	(United States) Clint Peay	New England Revolution II	Colorado Rapids 2	
June	(Brazil) Nick Firmino	Atlanta United 2	(United States) Luciano Sanchez	Philadelphia Union II	(United States) Damian Las	Austin FC II	(United States) Benny Feilhaber	Sporting KC II	Crown Legacy FC	
July	(United States) Patrick Agyemang (Uganda) Ibrahim Kasule	Atlanta United 2 New York Red Bulls II	(United States) Luciano Sanchez	Philadelphia Union II	(United States) Adam Beaudry	Colorado Rapids 2	(United States) Benny Feilhaber	Sporting KC II	Sporting KC II	
August	(Uganda) Ibrahim Kasule (United States) MD Myers	New York Red Bulls II NYCFC II	(United States) Miles Perkovich	Inter Miami CF II	(United States) Damian Las	Austin FC II	(Wales) Jack Collison	Huntsville City FC	New England Revolution II	

=== Mid-Season Awards ===
Player of the Mid-Season		Rising Star of the Mid-Season		Goalkeeper of the Mid-Season		Coach of the Mid-Season		Team of the Mid-Season	Ref.
(Brazil) Nick Firmino	Atlanta United 2	(United States) Damian Las	Austin FC II	(United States) Giorgio De Libera	Columbus Crew 2	(Portugal) Jose Tavares	Crown Legacy FC	Colorado Rapids 2	

== See also ==
- 2023 Major League Soccer season
