= Donovan Parisian =

American soccer player (born 2004)

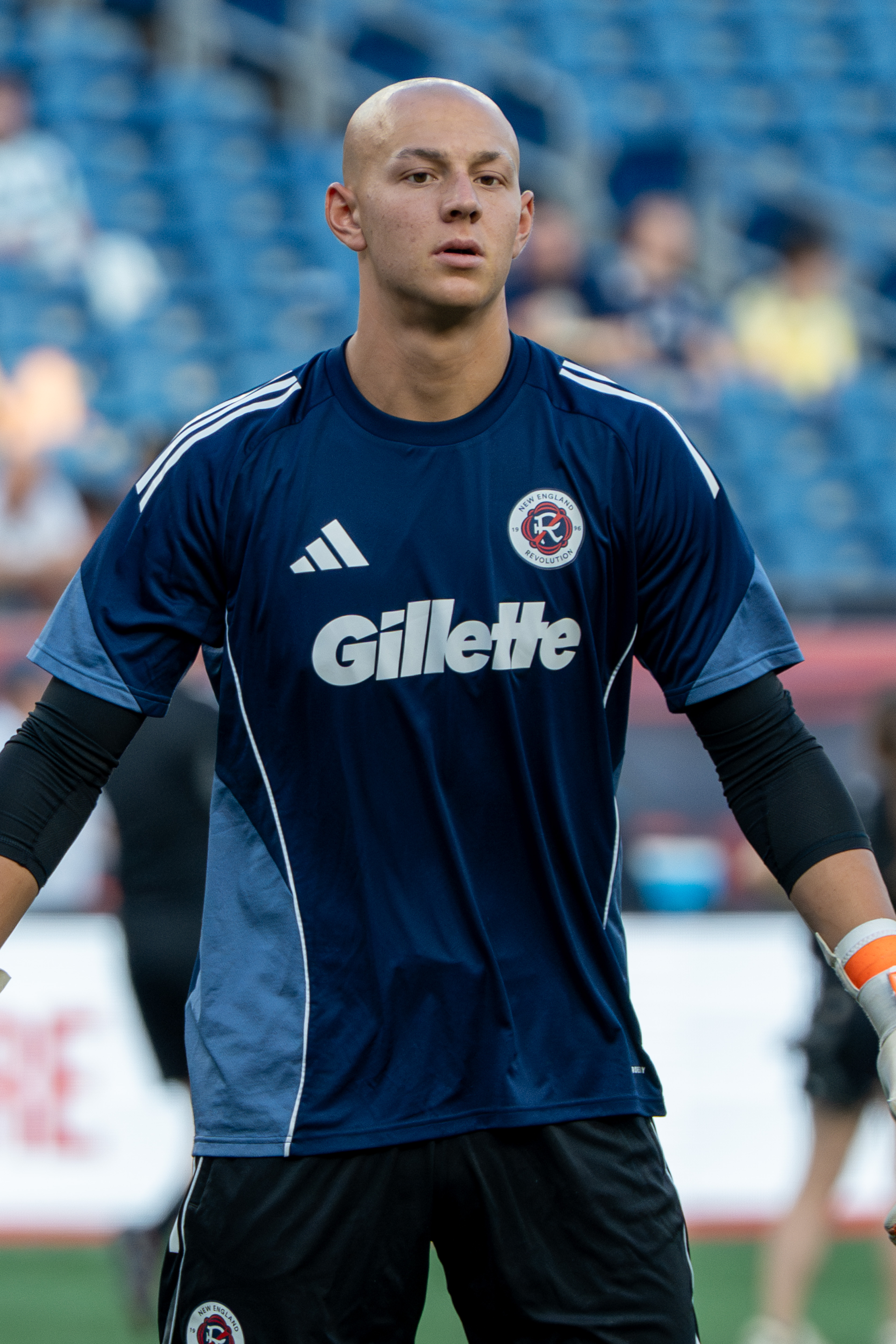
- Parisian with the New England Revolution in 2025

Personal information
- Full name: Donovan Jivan Parisian
- Date of birth: September 27, 2004 (age 22)
- Place of birth: Queen Creek, Arizona, US
- Height: 6 ft 4 in (1.93 m)
- Position: Goalkeeper

Team information
- Current team: New England Revolution
- Number: 33

College career
Years	Team	Apps	(Gls)
2023–2024	San Diego Toreros	20	(0)

Senior career*
Years	Team	Apps	(Gls)
2023	FC Arizona		
2024	Arizona Arsenal SC		
2025–	New England Revolution	0	(0)
2025–	→ New England Revolution II (loan)	16	(0)
- * Club domestic league appearances and goals as of October 20, 2025

Donovan Jivan Parisian (Armenian: Դոնովան Ջիվան Պարիզյան; born September 27, 2004) is an American professional soccer player who plays as a goalkeeper for Major League Soccer club New England Revolution.

== Club career ==
In 2023, Parisian played for FC Arizona in the National Premier Soccer League. Later that same year, he began his college career with the San Diego Toreros. In the 2024 season, Parisian was named the West Coast Conference (WCC) goalkeeper of the year and made the All-WWC first team. In 2024, Parisian also played for USL League Two team Arizona Arsenal SC.

On December 20, 2024, Parisian was selected by the New England Revolution in the first round (18th overall) of the 2025 MLS SuperDraft. Later, on January 3, 2025, Parisian signed with the Revolution through the 2026 season. Parisian made his professional debut with the reserve team, New England Revolution II, in a 4–0 win over Toronto FC II in which he made five saves.

Parisian made his first team debut on April 14, 2026, in the Revolution's 2026 U.S. Open Cup round of 32 victory over Rhode Island FC, a match in which he stopped three consecutive penalties in the shootout.

== International career ==
Parisian is eligible to represent United States and Armenia at international level.

On May 29, 2025, Parisian was called up to the Armenia U21 squad for training camp and two friendlies against Cyprus on June 3 and 6 respectively.

== Career statistics ==
As of match played October 20, 2025

Appearances and goals by club, season and competition
Club	Season	League			U.S. Open Cup		Continental		Other		Total	
Club	Season	Division	Apps	Goals	Apps	Goals	Apps	Goals	Apps	Goals	Apps	Goals
New England Revolution	2025	Major League Soccer	0	0	0	0	—		—		0	0
New England Revolution II (loan)	2025	MLS Next Pro	16	0	0	0	—		0	0	16	0
Career total			16	0	0	0	0	0	0	0	16	0

== Honors ==
Individual

- West Coast Conference (WCC) Goalkeeper of the Year: 2024
- All-WCC First Team: 2024
