= Allan Oyirwoth =

Ugandan footballer (born 2007)

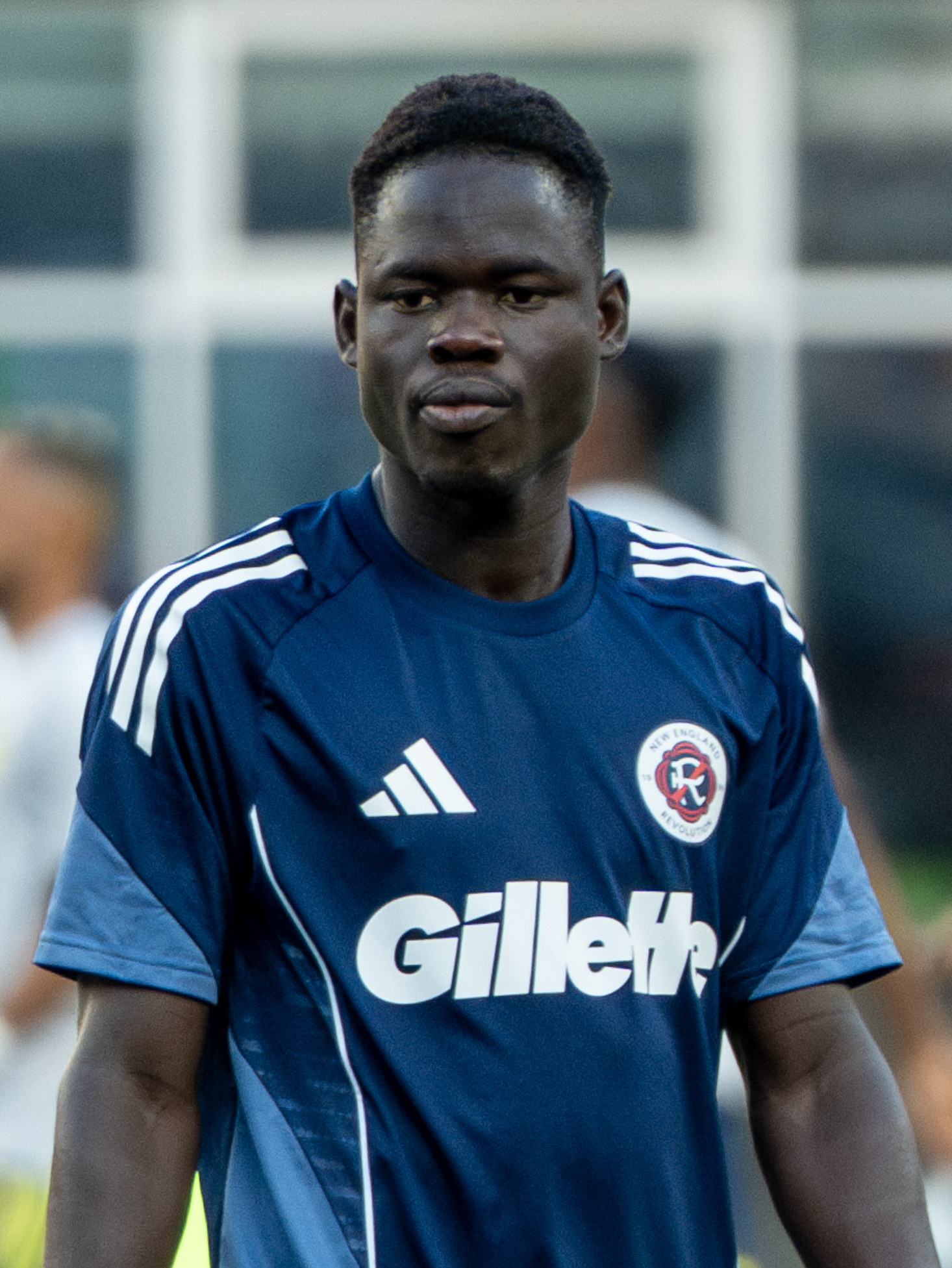
- Oyirwoth with the New England Revolution in 2025

Personal information
- Date of birth: 23 January 2007 (age 19)
- Place of birth: Amor, Uganda
- Height: 1.85 m (6 ft 1 in)
- Position: Midfielder

Team information
- Current team: Dunfermline Athletic (on loan from New England Revolution)
- Number: 19

Senior career*
Years	Team	Apps	(Gls)
2025–	New England Revolution	5	(0)
2025–2026	New England Revolution II	27	(2)
2026–	→ Dunfermline Athletic (loan)	4	(0)

International career^{‡}
2023–	Uganda	4	(0)
- * Club domestic league appearances and goals as of 14:56, 12 September 2026 (UTC) ‡ National team caps and goals as of 15:21, 24 September 2025 (UTC)

Allan Oyirwoth (born 23 January 2007) is a Ugandan professional footballer who plays for Dunfermline Athletic on loan from Major League Soccer club New England Revolution and the Uganda national football team.

== Early life ==
He is from Pakwach in the West Nile region of Uganda. He attended Kibuli S.S and Amus College in Uganda, and Brooke House College and Academy in Leicester, England. He was MVP in the Ugandan National Football Championships held in Fort Portal and finished as top scorer in the International Schools Football (ISF) championship in Morocco in 2023. Allan has nine siblings, along the footballers Daniel (formerly of Tusker F.C., Express FC, David (of Walukuba Kisinja FC) , Brian (formerly for New Life FC Chopelwor and Nile Hotspurs Football Club) and Steven Oyirwoth (formely Kampala City Council F.C.).

== Club career ==
In January 2025, he signed for Major League Soccer side New England Revolution. Taking a supplemental roster spot, he agreed a contract that goes through the 2028 season and includes a club option for 2029.

Oyirwoth was loaned to New England Revolution II for the 2025 MLS Next Pro season. He made his debut on March 13, earning a start in a 2-0 win over FC Cincinnati 2. He scored his first goal on 26 April, a game-winner against New York City FC II.

He made his debut for the first team on 7 May in a 2-1 win in the U.S. Open Cup round of 32 against Rhode Island FC. He made his MLS debut on 6 September, coming on as a 69th minute substitute for Jackson Yueill in a 3-2 loss to Chicago Fire FC. He made his first start on 13 September, in a 1-1 draw with Toronto FC.

On 8 August 2026, Oyirwoth joined Scottish Championship side Dunfermline Athletic on a season-long loan.

== International career ==
He played for the Uganda U20 side which reached the final of the 2023 African Games in Ghana, scoring the goal against Senegal in a 1–0 win which ensured they topped their group.

He made his competitive debut for the senior Uganda national football team in 2023 as a teenager. He played in a 2026 FIFA World Cup qualification (CAF) against Somalia in November 2023.
