= Pablo Moreira (footballer) =

Uruguayan football manager (born 1985)

Personal information
- Date of birth: 6 March 1985 (age 41)
- Place of birth: Montevideo, Uruguay
- Height: 1.91 m (6 ft 3 in)
- Position: Forward

Team information
- Current team: New England Revolution II

College career
Years	Team	Apps	(Gls)
2003–2007	Akron Zips		

Managerial career
- 2025: New England Revolution (caretaker)
- 2026–: New England Revolution II

Pablo Moreira (born 6 March 1985) is a Uruguayan football manager and former player. He is the manager of New England Revolution II in MLS Next Pro.

== Early and personal life ==
Born in Montevideo, Moreira is the son of José Hermes Moreira, also known as "Chico". The older Moreira was part of the Nacional squad that won the Copa Libertadores and Intercontinental Cup in 1980. Pablo Moreira grew up in Broadview Heights, Ohio and attended Brecksville High School. He studied international business and foreign languages at the University of Akron.

== Career ==
Moreira played college soccer as a forward for the Akron Zips, and was later the team's director of operations under Caleb Porter. Starting from the 2013 season, he moved with Porter to Major League Soccer club Portland Timbers, as player relations manager. Part of his responsibility was to integrate the team's Spanish-speaking players.

Moreira followed Porter to the Columbus Crew (2019–2022) and New England Revolution (2024–2025). When Porter was sacked on 14 September 2025, Moreira was put in charge for the rest of the season. On his debut six days later, he lost 1–0 away to the Philadelphia Union, followed by a win, loss and draw in the final three games as the team missed the playoffs. On 3 December, he was put in charge of the reserve team in MLS Next Pro.
