= Myles Morgan =

Canadian soccer player (born 2005)

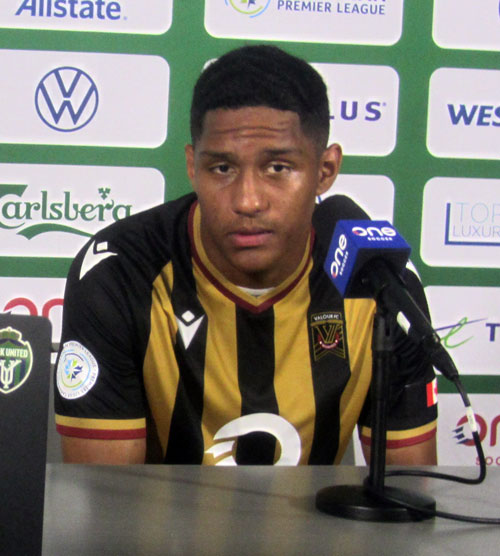
- Morgan in 2025

Personal information
- Full name: Myles Xavier Wayne Beckham Morgan
- Date of birth: June 20, 2005 (age 21)
- Place of birth: Toronto, Ontario, Canada
- Height: 1.80 m (5 ft 11 in)
- Positions: Forward; midfielder

Team information
- Current team: New England Revolution II
- Number: 21

Youth career
- 2018–2022: DeRo TFC
- 2022–2023: Toronto FC

Senior career*
Years	Team	Apps	(Gls)
2023	Toronto FC II	9	(2)
2024	Whitecaps FC 2	21	(2)
2025	Valour FC	26	(7)
2026–	New England Revolution II	26	(14)

International career^{‡}
2024	Canada U20	7	(6)
- * Club domestic league appearances and goals as of September 20, 2026 ‡ National team caps and goals as of August 26, 2025

Myles Xavier Wayne Beckham Morgan (born June 20, 2005) is a Canadian professional soccer player who plays for New England Revolution II in MLS Next Pro.

== Early life ==
From 2018 to 2022, Morgan played youth soccer with DeRo United Futbol Academy (later renamed DeRo TFC), before joining the Toronto FC Academy in January 2022.

== Club career ==
In 2023, Morgan played with Toronto FC II in MLS Next Pro. On August 10, 2023, he scored his first professional goal, netting the winning goal in a 2–1 victory over New York Red Bulls II, earning him MLS Next Pro Rising Star of Matchday honours.

In 2024, Morgan joined Whitecaps FC 2 in MLS Next Pro as an amateur academy player, before signing a professional contract for the remainder of the season, with an option for 2025 on May 31, 2024. On June 9, 2024, he scored a brace in a 4–1 victory over Los Angeles FC 2.

In March 2025, Morgan signed a two-year contract with Valour FC in the Canadian Premier League, with an option for 2027. He made his debut on April 5, 2025, against Pacific FC. On July 13, 2025, he scored his first CPL goal in a 3-2 loss against York United FC which earned Goal of the Month for July. On September 5, 2025, he scored a hat trick in a 5-2 victory over Vancouver FC. He finished as the team's leading scorer in 2025.

In December 2025, Morgan signed with New England Revolution II in MLS Next Pro. On March 1, 2026, he scored his first goal for the club, in his debut against Atlanta United FC 2. Morgan finished the season as the team's top goalscorer with 14 goals, setting the team record for most goals in a season.

== International career ==
In February 2024, Morgan was called up to the Canada U20 for the first time for the 2024 CONCACAF U-20 Championship qualifying matches. In his debut on February 23, 2024, he scored a hat trick in an 8–0 victory over Dominica U20. In June 2024, he was named to the squad for the 2024 CONCACAF U-20 Championship tournament.

== Career statistics ==
As of October 26, 2026

Club	Season	League			Playoffs		National Cup		Other		Total	
Club	Season	Division	Apps	Goals	Apps	Goals	Apps	Goals	Apps	Goals	Apps	Goals
Toronto FC II	2023	MLS Next Pro	9	2	—		—		—		9	2
Whitecaps FC 2	2024	MLS Next Pro	21	2	1	0	—		—		22	2
Valour FC	2025	Canadian Premier League	26	7	—		2	0	—		28	7
New England Revolution II	2026	MLS Next Pro	26	14	1	0	—		—		27	14
Career total			82	25	2	0	2	0	0	0	86	25
