= Jared Smith =

American football player (born 1990)

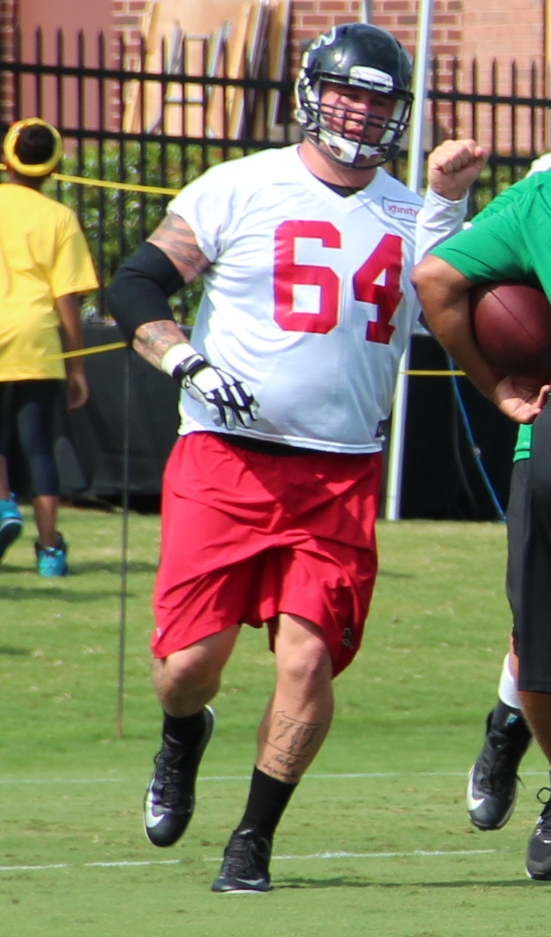
- Smith with the Atlanta Falcons in 2015

No. 66, 64
- Position: Guard

Personal information
- Born: March 20, 1990 (age 36); Pittsburgh, Pennsylvania, U.S.
- Listed height: 6 ft 3 in (1.91 m)
- Listed weight: 315 lb (143 kg)

Career information
- High school: Greencastle-Antrim (PA)
- College: New Hampshire
- NFL draft: 2013: 7th round, 241st overall pick

Career history
- Seattle Seahawks (2013–2014)*; Atlanta Falcons (2015)*; Dallas Cowboys (2016)*
- * Offseason or practice squad member only

Awards and highlights
- Super Bowl champion (XLVIII)
- Stats at Pro Football Reference

Jared Smith (born March 20, 1990) is an American former professional football guard. He played college football at New Hampshire. He was invited to the 2013 NFL Combine as a defensive lineman. He was selected by the Seattle Seahawks in the seventh round of the 2013 NFL draft. Before the 2013 season, he was transitioned from a defensive lineman to an offensive lineman.

== College career ==
Smith played college football for the New Hampshire Wildcats as a defensive tackle. Smith played very minimally in his freshman season, playing in only six games and recording eight tackles. In his sophomore season, Smith played in all thirteen games for New Hampshire and recorded 38 tackles, four sacks, and a blocked kick. During his sophomore year, Smith earned the 2010-11 CAA Commissioner's Academic Award. Smith posted similar stats in his junior season, posting 43 tackles, 2.5 sacks, and blocking another kick while playing in all 12 of the Wildcats' games.

Before Smith's senior season, he was placed on the inaugural Senior Bowl watch list. During the season, Smith recorded 26 solo tackles with 14 assists while recording 4 sacks. After the season, Smith was announced as a member of the All-New England Team and the All-CAA First-team. Smith was also invited to play in the 2013 Texas vs. Nation All-Star Game, a game in which he recorded 2 sacks.

== Professional career ==
Pre-draft measurables
Height	Weight	Arm length	Hand span	40-yard dash	10-yard split	20-yard split	20-yard shuttle	Three-cone drill	Vertical jump	Broad jump	Bench press
6 ft 3 3/8 in (1.91 m)	302 lb (137 kg)	33 1/2 in (0.85 m)	10 1/2 in (0.27 m)	5.08 s	1.77 s	2.97 s	4.39 s	7.20 s	32.5 in (0.83 m)	9 ft 7 in (2.92 m)	28 reps
All values from NFL Combine

=== Seattle Seahawks ===
On April 27, 2013, the Seattle Seahawks selected Smith with the 241st pick in the 2013 NFL draft. Despite playing his entire college career on the defensive line, the Seahawks drafted Smith with the intent of using him on the offensive line. Jared Smith was added to the Seahawks active roster on September 12, 2013. On October 8, Smith was placed on season-ending IR. Despite spending the majority of the season on IR, Smith became a Super Bowl champion when the Seahawks beat the Denver Broncos 43–8 in Super Bowl XLVIII for their first Super Bowl in franchise history.

Smith was released with an injury settlement by the Seahawks on March 24, 2015. He was later picked up by the Atlanta Falcons.

=== Atlanta Falcons ===
Smith was signed to the practice squad by the Atlanta Falcons on March 18, 2015.

=== Dallas Cowboys ===
Smith was signed by the Dallas Cowboys. On August 23, 2016, Smith was waived/injured. After clearing waivers, Smith was placed on injured reserve.

Smith reached an undisclosed injury settlement with the Cowboys on September 5, 2016. Smith was subsequently removed from the team's injured reserve list.

== Personal life ==
Smith lives in Texas and is a practicing real estate agent.
