= Jayden Da =

American soccer player (born 2002)

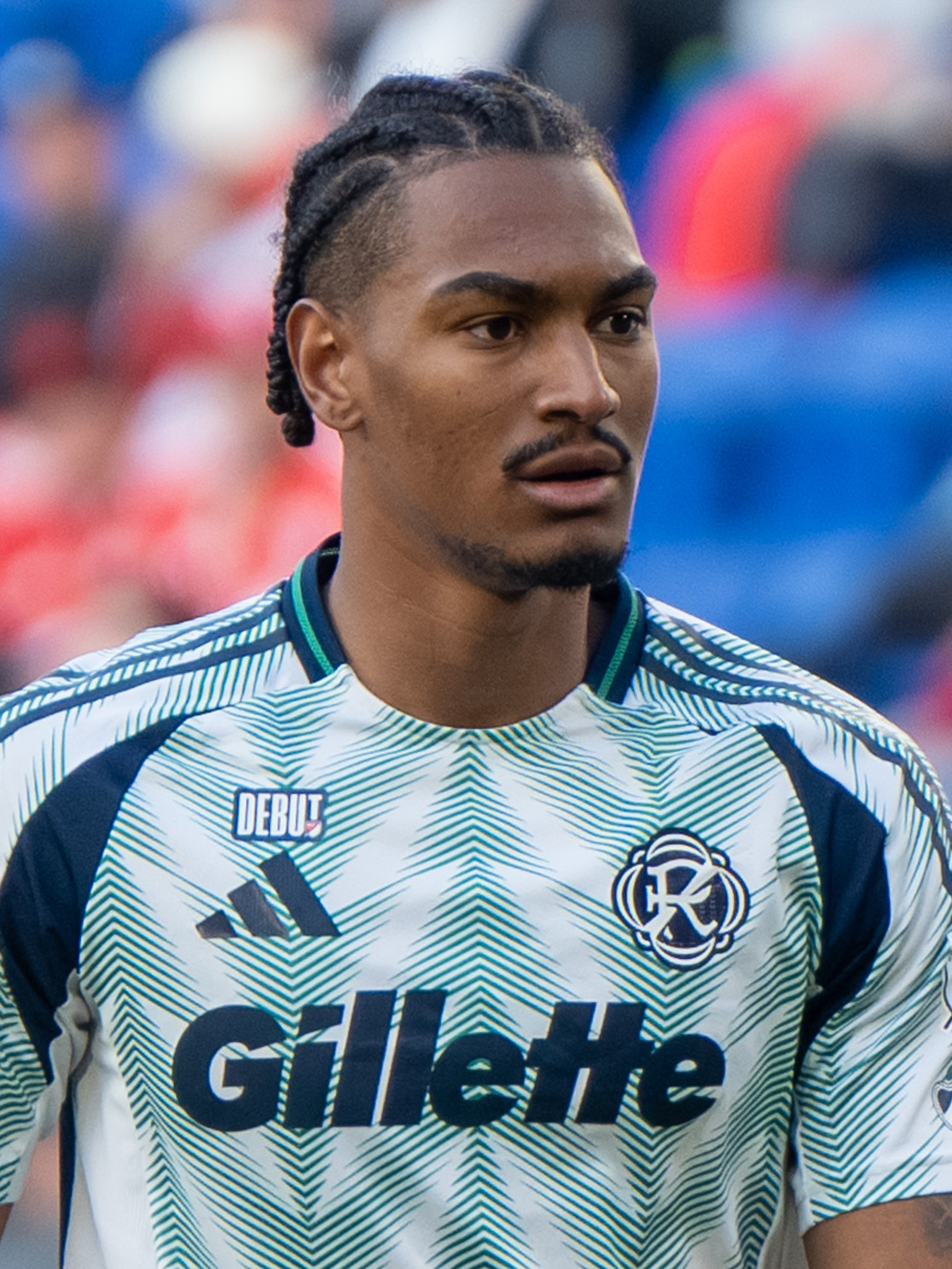
- Da with the New England Revolution in 2026

Personal information
- Date of birth: April 8, 2002 (age 24)
- Place of birth: Boston, Massachusetts, United States
- Height: 6 ft 4 in (1.93 m)
- Position: Forward

Team information
- Current team: New England Revolution II
- Number: 10

Youth career
- Olney Boys & Girls Club

College career
Years	Team	Apps	(Gls)
2020–2021	Washington & Jefferson Presidents	11	(6)
2021–2023	Duquesne Dukes	46	(8)

Senior career*
Years	Team	Apps	(Gls)
2022	Patuxent FA	7	(2)
2023	Toledo Villa		
2024	Columbus Crew 2	24	(7)
2025–	New England Revolution II	17	(1)
2026	→ New England Revolution (loan)	1	(0)
- * Club domestic league appearances and goals as of October 16, 2026

Jayden Da (born April 8, 2002) is an American professional soccer player who plays for New England Revolution II in MLS Next Pro.

== Early life ==
Da was born in Boston and also lived in West Africa for eight years during his youth, before returning to the United States. He played youth soccer with the Olney Boys & Girls Club.

== College career ==
In 2020, Da began attending Washington & Jefferson College, where he played for the men's soccer team in NCAA Division III (the season was delayed to the spring of 2021 due to the COVID-19 pandemic). On March 21, 2021, he scored his first collegiate goals, netting a brace in a 4–0 victory over the Saint Vincent Bearcats. In April 2021, he was named the Presidents' Athletic Conference Rookie of the Week. On April 13, he scored the overtime winner in double overtime against the Geneva Golden Tornadoes. At the end of the season, he was named the PAC Player of the Year and Newcomer of the Year, and was named to the All-PAC First Team and the PAC All-Tournament Team. During his sole season, he helped W&J win the 2020 PAC Championship, and led the PAC in points (17) and assists (5), while finishing tied for second in goals (6).

In the fall of 2021, Da transferred to Duquesne University to play for the men's soccer team in NCAA Division I. He made his debut on August 26, 2021, against the Pittsburgh Panthers. He made his first start and scored his first goal on November 14, 2021, against the Saint Louis Billikens. On September 9, 2023, he scored a brace against the Niagara Purple Eagles in a 2–1 victory. At the end of the 2023 season, he was named to the All-Atlantic 10 Second Team and the All-Southeast Region Third Team. Over his three seasons with Duquesne, he appeared in 46 games, scoring eight goals and adding four assists.

== Club career ==
In 2022, he played with the Patuxent Football Athletics in USL League Two.

At the 2024 MLS SuperDraft, Da was selected in the first round (29th overall) by the Columbus Crew. In February 2024, he signed a contract with the second team, Columbus Crew 2, in MLS Next Pro. Columbus announced they had declined Da's contract option in on December 4, 2024.

Da joined New England Revolution II on a one-year contract on December 5, 2024. He missed the entire 2025 season due to a torn ACL injury. In February 2026, he signed a short-term loan with the New England Revolution first team. He made his Major League Soccer debut on February 28, 2026, against the New York Red Bulls.
