= Chris Mbaï-Assem =

Central African footballer (born 2005)

Personal information
- Full name: Chris Tamro Mbaï-Assem
- Date of birth: 12 August 2005 (age 21)
- Place of birth: Rocky Mount, North Carolina, United States
- Height: 1.90 m (6 ft 3 in)
- Position: Centre-back

Team information
- Current team: New England Revolution II
- Number: 4

Youth career
- Concarneau
- 2020–2023: Vannes
- 2022–2023: Stade Briochin

Senior career*
Years	Team	Apps	(Gls)
2023	Stade Briochin II	1	(0)
2023–2025	Strasbourg II	23	(0)
2025–	New England Revolution II	14	(0)

International career^{‡}
2025–	Central African Republic	1	(0)
- * Club domestic league appearances and goals as of 16:29, 12 September 2025 (UTC) ‡ National team caps and goals as of 16:29, 12 September 2025 (UTC)

Chris Tamro Mbaï-Assem (born 12 August 2005) is a Central African professional footballer who plays as a centre-back for the MLS Next Pro club New England Revolution II. Born in the United States, he plays for the Central African Republic national team.

== Club career ==
Mbaï-Assem is a product of the youth academies of the French clubs Concarneau, Vannes and Stade Briochin. Making one appearance with Stade Briochin's reserves in 2023, he joined Strasbourg's reserves that same year. On 23 August 2025, he transferred to the MLS Next Pro club New England Revolution II until 2026.

== International career ==
Born in the United States, Mbaï-Assem is of Central African descent. He was called up to the Central African Republic national team for a set of friendlies in September 2025.
