= Joseph Buck =

American soccer player (born 2002)

Personal information
- Full name: Joseph Buck
- Date of birth: December 10, 2002 (age 23)
- Place of birth: Arlington, Massachusetts, United States
- Height: 6 ft 0 in (1.83 m)
- Position: Midfielder

Team information
- Current team: New England Revolution II

Youth career
- 2016–2019: Boston Bolts
- 2019–2021: New England Revolution

College career
Years	Team	Apps	(Gls)
2021–2024	Georgetown Hoyas	74	(4)

Senior career*
Years	Team	Apps	(Gls)
2021	New England Revolution II	2	(0)
2024–	New England Revolution II	0	(0)
- * Club domestic league appearances and goals as of January 24, 2025

Joseph Buck (born December 10, 2002) is an American soccer player who plays as a midfielder for MLS Next Pro club New England Revolution II.

== Club career ==
Born in Arlington, Massachusetts, Buck began his career within the youth setup of local side Boston Bolts. In 2019, Buck joined the New England Revolution youth academy, playing for club's under-18/19 side. In May 2020, it was announced that Buck had committed to playing college soccer for the Georgetown Hoyas, joining the side in August 2021.

On May 12, 2021, Buck was called into the squad for the Revolution USL League One affiliate, New England Revolution II. He made his senior debut for the club that night, starting and playing 79 minutes as the Revolution II lost 0–1.

In the fall of 2021, Buck moved to play college soccer at Georgetown University.

Buck is eligible to play internationally for the United States, England, and Wales.

== Career statistics ==
As of match played May 28, 2021

Appearances and goals by club, season and competition
Club	Season	League			National Cup		Continental		Total	
Club	Season	Division	Apps	Goals	Apps	Goals	Apps	Goals	Apps	Goals
New England Revolution II	2021	USL League One	2	0	—		—		2	0
Career total			2	0	0	0	0	0	2	0
