= Cristiano Oliveira =

American soccer player (born 2008)

Personal information
- Full name: Cristiano Paulo Santos Oliveira
- Date of birth: March 30, 2008 (age 18)
- Place of birth: Cambridge, Massachusetts, U.S.
- Height: 1.83 m (6 ft 0 in)
- Position: Midfielder

Team information
- Current team: New England Revolution
- Number: 35

Youth career
- –2022: FC Boston Bolts
- 2022–2024: New England Revolution

Senior career*
Years	Team	Apps	(Gls)
2024–	New England Revolution II	43	(5)
2025–	New England Revolution	1	(0)

International career
2024–	United States U17	3	(1)
- * Club domestic league appearances and goals

Cristiano Paulo Santos Oliveira (born March 30, 2008) is an American professional soccer player who plays as a midfielder for Major League Soccer club New England Revolution.

A product of the New England Revolution Academy, Oliveira signed his first professional contract with New England Revolution II in 2024 before signing a Homegrown Player contract with the Revolution first team in 2026.

== Early life ==
Oliveira was born in Cambridge, Massachusetts, and raised in Somerville, Massachusetts. The son of Brazilian immigrants, he began playing youth soccer in nearby Chelsea before joining the FC Boston Bolts academy at age 11. In 2022, he joined the New England Revolution Academy, where he played for the club's under-17 side and emerged as one of its top youth prospects, leading the team in goals.

== Club career ==
=== New England Revolution II ===
Oliveira signed his first professional contract with New England Revolution II in October 2024 at the age of 16. He made 10 appearances during the 2024 MLS NEXT Pro season, recording one assist.

In 2025, Oliveira became a regular starter for Revolution II, making 24 league appearances and scoring five goals. On April 23, he scored his first professional goal in a 2–1 victory over Columbus Crew 2. Later that season, he was selected to represent New England at the 2025 MLS NEXT All-Star Game, scoring a goal in the exhibition match.

Oliveira remained a regular contributor for Revolution II in 2026 while also appearing with the first team. Through July 2026, he had made 43 MLS NEXT Pro appearances and scored five goals.

=== New England Revolution ===
Oliveira made his first-team debut on May 7, 2025, as a substitute in a Lamar Hunt U.S. Open Cup Round of 32 match against Rhode Island FC. He scored the winning goal in the 88th minute of a 2–1 victory, sending the Revolution into the Round of 16.

On January 14, 2026, New England signed Oliveira as the club's 16th Homegrown Player on a contract through the 2029 season with a club option for 2030. He made his Major League Soccer debut on May 23, 2026, appearing as a substitute against Charlotte FC.

== International career ==
Oliveira has represented the United States at the under-15, under-16, under-17, and under-18 levels. He received his first call-up to the United States under-17 national team in November 2024 for a training camp in Florida. He appeared in all three group-stage matches at the 2025 CONCACAF U-17 Championship, scoring his first international goal in a victory over Saint Kitts and Nevis.

In 2026, Oliveira was called into the United States under-18 squad for the 2026 Torneio Internacional de Lisboa in Portugal and a June training camp in Spain.

== Career statistics ==
=== Club ===
Club	Season	League	League	Cup	Cup	Total	Total		
				Apps	Goals	Apps	Goals	Apps	Goals
New England Revolution II	2024	MLS NEXT Pro	10	0	—	—	10	0	
New England Revolution II	2025	MLS NEXT Pro	24	5	—	—	24	5	
New England Revolution II	2026	MLS NEXT Pro	9	0	—	—	9	0	
Total			43	5	0	0	43	5	
New England Revolution	2025	Major League Soccer	0	0	2	1	2	1	
New England Revolution	2026	Major League Soccer	1	0	2	0	3	0	
Total			1	0	4	1	5	1	
Career total			44	5	4	1	48	6	

== Honours ==
Individual

- MLS NEXT All-Star: 2025
