= JD Gunn =

Panamanian footballer (born 2000)

Personal information
- Full name: John David Gunn Curlin
- Date of birth: 21 January 2000 (age 26)
- Place of birth: Panama City, Panama
- Height: 1.98 m (6 ft 6 in)
- Position: Goalkeeper

Team information
- Current team: New England Revolution II
- Number: 73

College career
Years	Team	Apps	(Gls)
2018–2022	Biola Eagles	51	(0)
2023	Memphis Tigers	10	(0)

Senior career*
Years	Team	Apps	(Gls)
2022	Charlotte Eagles	3	(0)
2024–	New England Revolution II	24	(0)
2024	→ New England Revolution (loan)	0	(0)

International career^{‡}
2026–	Panama	2	(0)
- * Club domestic league appearances and goals as of 23:37, 13 July 2025 (UTC) ‡ National team caps and goals as of 23:39, 3 June 2026 (UTC)

John David Gunn Curlin (born 21 January 2000) is a Panamanian professional footballer who plays as a goalkeeper for the MLS Next Pro club New England Revolution II and the Panama national team.

== Early life ==
Gunn was born and raised in Panama City, Panama to an American family. He moved to the United States at the age of 15 where he attended high school at Wheaton Academy. He was a multi-sport athlete who played both basketball and soccer.

== Club career ==
In 2018 Gunn committed to playing soccer at Biola University, and played with the Biola Eagles from 2019 to 2022. In 2022, he had a brief stint with the Charlotte Eagles in the USL League Two. He was named the Goalkeeper of the Year in the PacWest Conference in 2022. He moved to the Memphis Tigers in 2023, where he was a graduate student.

On 9 February 2024, Gunn signed his first professional contract with New England Revolution II in the MLS Next Pro for the 2024 season. On 27 April 2024, he signed with the New England Revolution on a short-term contract for a Major League Soccer match against Inter Miami CF. On 11 October 2024, New England Revolution II exercised contract tying him to the club for the following season.

On 5 February 2026, he signed with New England's first team.

== International career ==
=== Basketball ===
In 2018, Gunn was called up to play for the Panama men's national under-18 basketball team at the 2018 FIBA Under-18 Americas Championship.

=== Association football ===
In March 2024, he was part of the preliminary squad for the final stage of the 2023–24 CONCACAF Nations League. In October 2024, he was called up to the Panama national team for a set of international friendly matches.

== Career statistics ==
=== Club ===
As of match played 13 May 2026

Appearances and goals by club, season and competition
Club	Season	League			Cup		Continental		Other		Total	
Club	Season	Division	Apps	Goals	Apps	Goals	Apps	Goals	Apps	Goals	Apps	Goals
Charlotte Eagles	2022	USL League Two	3	0	—		—		—		3	0
New England Revolution II	2024	MLS Next Pro	18	0	—		—		—		18	0
New England Revolution II	2025	MLS Next Pro	9	0	—		—		—		9	0
New England Revolution II	2026	MLS Next Pro	4	0	—		—		—		4	0
New England Revolution II	Total		31	0	—		—		—		31	0
New England Revolution (loan)	2024	MLS	0	0	0	0	0	0	0	0	0	0
Career total			34	0	0	0	0	0	0	0	34	0

=== International ===
As of match played 3 June 2026

Appearances and goals by national team and year
National team	Year	Apps	Goals
Panama	2025	1	0
Panama	2026	1	0
Total		2	0
