= Malcolm Fry =

American soccer player (born 2005)

Personal information
- Full name: Malcolm Curtenius Fry
- Date of birth: May 15, 2005 (age 21)
- Place of birth: Akron, Ohio, U.S.
- Height: 5 ft 9 in (1.75 m)
- Position: Forward

Team information
- Current team: Lexington SC on loan from New England Revolution
- Number: 24

Youth career
- 2017–2018: Castelnau Le Crès FC
- 2018–2022: New England Revolution

Senior career*
Years	Team	Apps	(Gls)
2022–	New England Revolution II	80	(13)
2023–	New England Revolution	6	(0)
2026	→ Lexington SC (loan)	11	(0)
- * Club domestic league appearances and goals as of 11:28, 9 November 2026 (UTC)

Malcolm Curtenius Fry (born May 15, 2005) is an American professional soccer player who plays as forward for Lexington SC of the USL Championship on loan from Major League Soccer club New England Revolution.

== Professional career ==
Fry joined the Revolution Academy in 2019. He played for the u19 team when they won the 2022 MLS NEXT Cup.

On October 28, 2022, he signed his first contract with Revolution II in MLS Next Pro. On October 18, 2023, Fry became the Revolution's 13th Homegrown player when he signed a first-team contract. The deal would run through the 2026 season with a club option for 2027.

On July 16, 2026, Lexington SC of the USL Championship announced they had acquired Fry on loan from New England.

== Career statistics ==
=== Club ===
As of match played November 10, 2023

Appearances and goals by club, season and competition
Club	Season	League			National cup		Continental		Other		Total	
Club	Season	Division	Apps	Goals	Apps	Goals	Apps	Goals	Apps	Goals	Apps	Goals
New England Revolution II
New England Revolution II	2022	MLS Next Pro	8	1	—		—		—		8	1
New England Revolution II	2023	MLS Next Pro	30	5	—		—		—		30	5
New England Revolution II	Total		38	6	—		—		—		38	6
Career total			38	6	0	0	0	0	0	0	38	6

== Personal life ==
Fry is from Groton, Massachusetts. Fry is also a long-time Revolution fan and grew up going to games with his family.
