= Liam Butts =

American-Guyanese footballer (born 2001)

Personal information
- Full name: Liam Shiloh Naeem Butts
- Date of birth: February 20, 2001 (age 25)
- Place of birth: New Port Richey, Florida, U.S.
- Height: 6 ft 1 in (1.85 m)
- Position: Forward

Team information
- Current team: Loudoun United (on loan from Atlanta United 2)
- Number: 17

Youth career
- 2010–2015: Gwinnett SA
- 2016–2019: Atlanta United

College career
Years	Team	Apps	(Gls)
2019–2024	Penn State Nittany Lions	72	(25)

Senior career*
Years	Team	Apps	(Gls)
2021	East Atlanta FC	1	(0)
2024–2025	New England Revolution II	35	(18)
2026–	Atlanta United 2	17	(4)
2026	→ Loudoun United (loan)	8	(1)

International career
2025–	Guyana	2	(0)
- * Club domestic league appearances and goals as of November 7, 2026

Liam Shiloh Naeem Butts (born February 20, 2001) is a professional footballer who plays as a forward for Loudoun United FC in the USL Championship on loan from MLS Next Pro club Atlanta United 2. Born in the United States, Butts plays for the Guyana national team.

== Club career ==
Born in Lawrenceville, Georgia, Butts began his career with the Atlanta United youth academy before joining Pennsylvania State University. He was selected by the San Jose Earthquakes in the 2023 MLS SuperDraft, with the fourth pick in the second round (33rd overall). Failing to earn a contract with the Earthquakes, he returned to Penn State for a 5th season.

=== New England Revolution II ===
Butts signed with MLS Next Pro side New England Revolution II on February 21, 2024. On August 25, 2025, he was named MLS Next Pro Player of the Matchweek., after scoring twice in a 3–1 victory.

=== Penn State University ===
Butts played for Pennsylvania State University from 2019 to 2023.

=== Atlanta United 2 ===
On December 17, 2025, Butts signed with MLS Next Pro side Atlanta United 2.

=== Loudoun United FC ===
In September 2026, Butts was loaned from Atlanta United 2 to Loudoun United FC for the remainder of the USL Championship season.

== International career ==
=== Guyana ===
In March 2025, Butts was included in the Guyana squad for two 2025 CONCACAF Gold Cup preliminary matches against Guatemala.

== Career statistics ==
As of match played August 29, 2025

Appearances and goals by club, season and competition
Club	Season	League			National cup		Other		Total	
Club	Season	Division	Apps	Goals	Apps	Goals	Apps	Goals	Apps	Goals
New England Revolution II	2024	MLS Next Pro	11	5	—	—	—	—	11	5
New England Revolution II	2025	MLS Next Pro	19	11	—	—	—	—	19	11
Total			30	16	0	0	0	0	30	16
Career total			30	16	0	0	0	0	30	16
