= Marcos Dias =

Brazilian footballer (born 2001)

Personal information
- Full name: Marcos Domingos Dias
- Date of birth: 30 November 2001 (age 24)
- Place of birth: Formoso do Araguaia, Brazil
- Height: 1.80 m (5 ft 11 in)
- Positions: Winger; forward

Team information
- Current team: Londoun United
- Number: 39

Youth career
- Palmeiras
- 2020–2022: Vasco da Gama

Senior career*
Years	Team	Apps	(Gls)
2022	Vasco da Gama	0	(0)
2022	→ New England Revolution II (loan)	19	(6)
2023–2025	New England Revolution II	75	(27)
2026–	Londoun United	15	(0)
- * Club domestic league appearances and goals as of October 31, 2026

Marcos Domingos Dias (born 30 November 2001) is a Brazilian footballer who plays as a forward for Londoun United in the USL Championship.

== Early life ==
He played in the youth system of Palmeiras, where he won the 2018 Under-17 Club World Cup and the 2019 U20 Paulistão.

In March 2020, Dias joined the youth system of CR Vasco da Gama, playing with the U20 side, on an initial one year contract. In February 2021, he entended his contract through August 2022 with a €40 million release clause, and in December 2021, he once again extended his contract with Vasco through 2023. With the U20s, he scored 21 goals in 87 games and won the U20 Copa de Brasil, U20 Carioca and Supercopa de Brasil in 2020.

== Club career ==
In January 2022, he joined New England Revolution II in MLS Next Pro on loan through December, although his arrival to the club was delayed until April due to visa issues. The deal includes a 50% mandatory obligigation to buy if Dias meets some performance targets. He made his debut on 1 May against Inter Miami II. He scored his first goal on 14 May against Toronto FC II. In October 2022, New England II reached an agreement to purchase him outright for the 2023 season.

After the 2025 season, Dias was named 2025 MLS NEXT Pro Playmaker of the Year, and also named to the 2025 MLS NEXT Pro Best XI.

On February 27, 2026, USL Championship side Loudoun United announced they had signed Dias to a multi-year contract through the 2027 season.

== Personal ==
Dias has a daughter who was born in August 2021.
