= NKU Soccer Stadium =

Stadium located in Highland Heights, Kentucky

Coordinates: 39°1′56″N 84°27′25″W

Scudamore Field
- at NKU Soccer Stadium
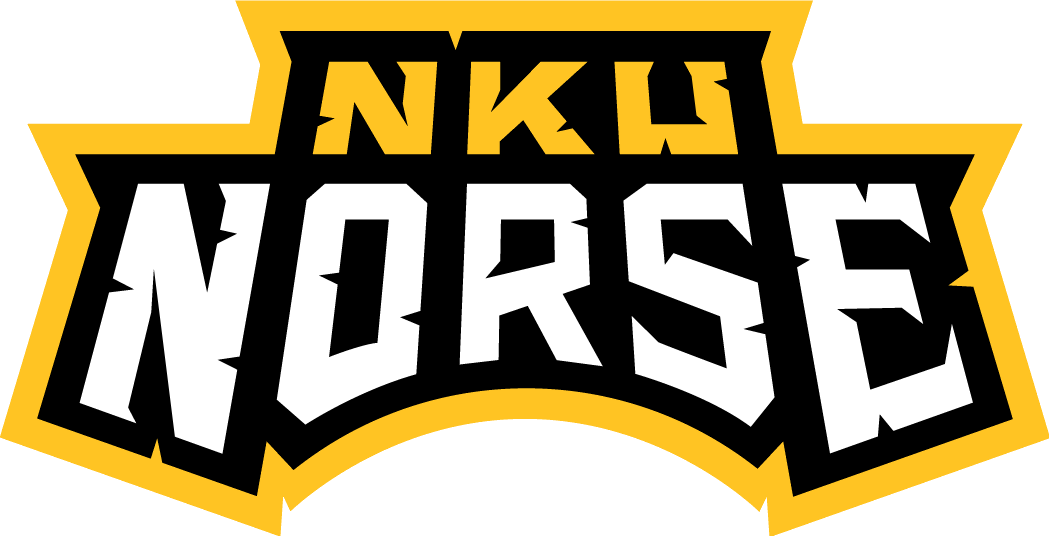

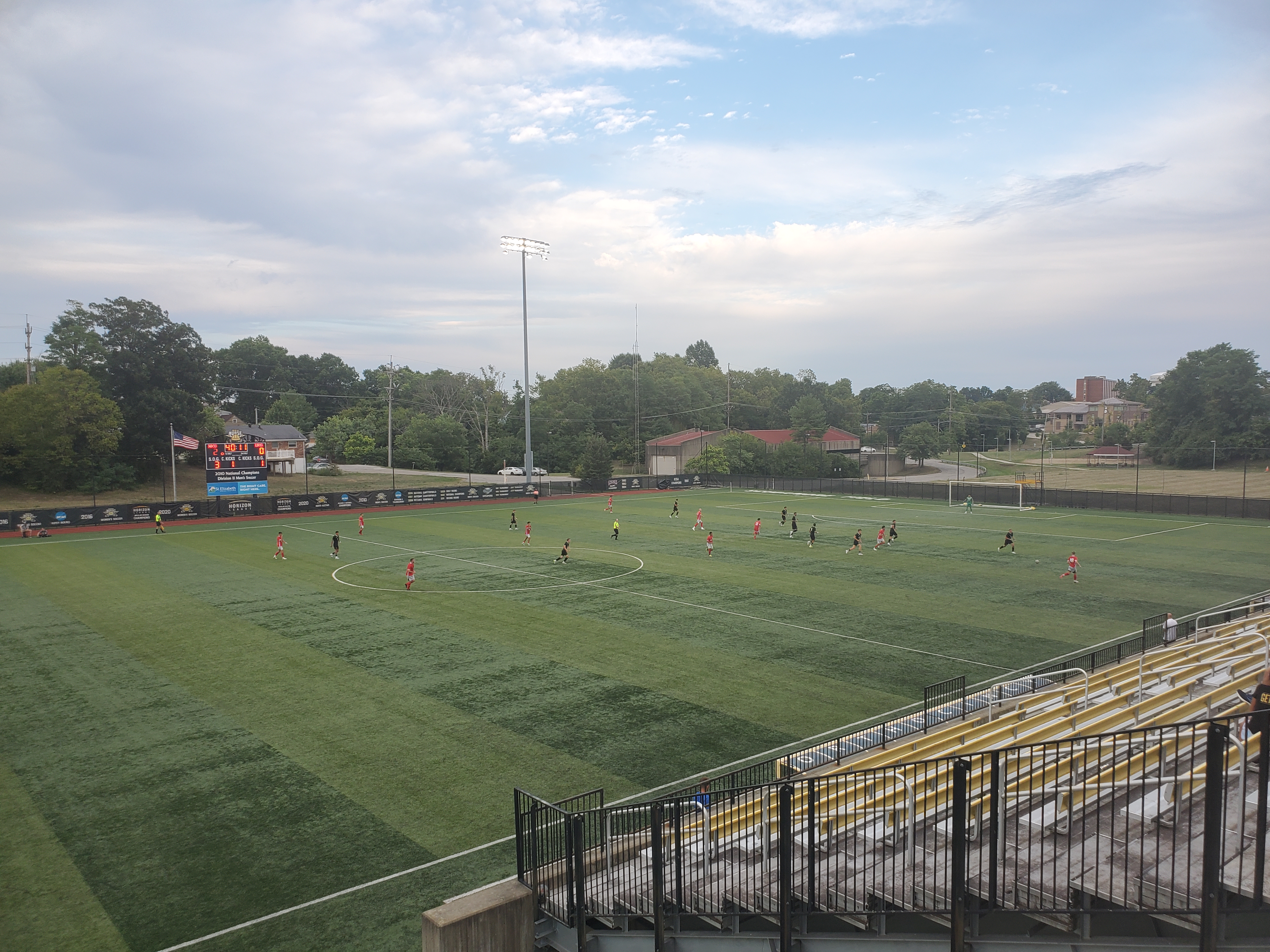
- The venue in 2024
- Interactive map of Scudamore Field
- Address: Highland Heights, KY; United States
- Capacity: 1,000
- Type: Soccer-specific stadium
- Surface: SportGrass
- Record attendance: 2,522 (August 21, 2016 vs. Kentucky)

Construction
- Opened: August 2009; 17 years ago

Tenants
- Northern Kentucky Norse (NCAA) (2009–present); FC Cincinnati 2 (MLSNP) (2022–present)

Website
- nkunorse.com/soccer-stadium

Scudamore Field at NKU Soccer Stadium is a soccer-specific stadium located in Highland Heights, Kentucky. The stadium is home to the Northern Kentucky Norse men's and women's soccer teams, as well as MLS Next Pro side FC Cincinnati 2.
