= New England Revolution II =

Soccer team

- Full name: New England Revolution II
- Founded: October 9, 2019; 7 years ago
- Stadium: Gillette Stadium
- Capacity: 20,000
- Owner: Robert Kraft
- Head coach: Pablo Moreira
- League: MLS Next Pro
- 2025: 3rd, Eastern Conference
- Website: www.revolutionsoccer.net/revolutionii
Home colors	Away colors

New England Revolution II is a professional soccer club based in the Greater Boston area that competes in MLS Next Pro, the third division of American soccer. The team is owned by, and operates as the reserve team of the Major League Soccer club New England Revolution. The team plays at Gillette Stadium. The team was announced as a member of League One on October 9, 2019.

On February 8, 2024, the team announced that eight of their 14 home games would be played at Mark A Ouellette Stadium in Hooksett, New Hampshire.

In 2026 the team announced they will be playing their 14 home games at Beirne Stadium in Smithfield, Rhode Island.

== History ==
On October 9, 2019, the New England Revolution announced the formation of a reserve team in USL League One that would begin play in the 2020 season and that they would play at Gillette Stadium in Foxborough. On November 25, 2019, the club announced its first manager, Clint Peay.

=== MLS Next Pro ===
The club announced on December 6, 2021, that it was joining the inaugural 21-team MLS Next Pro season starting in 2022.

== Players and staff ==
=== Current roster ===
As of January 5, 2026

No.	Pos.	Nation	Player
2	DF	USA	Jared Smith
3	DF	HAI	Shinieder Mimy
4	DF	CAF	Chris Mbaï-Assem
6	DF	SWE	Gabe Dahlin
8	MF	USA	Joseph Buck
10	FW	USA	Jayden Da
11	FW	USA	Carlos Zambrano
15	DF	USA	Jake Shannon
20	FW	USA	Sharod George
21	FW	CAN	Myles Morgan
23	DF	USA	Javaun Mussenden
27	GK	USA	Maxwell Weinstein
50	GK	USA	Matthew Tibbetts
65	MF	USA	Judah Siqueira

Signed to first team contract with New England Revolution
New England Revolution Academy player

=== Staff ===
Position	Name
Head coach	(Uruguay) Pablo Moreira
Associate head coach	(Brazil) Marcelo Santos
Goalkeeping coach	Vacant
Head athletic trainer	(United States) Darrell St. Jean
Sports performance coach	(United States) Pablo di Benedetto
Team administrator	(United States) Brandon Miskin
Equipment manager	(United States) Nathann Layton

== Statistics and records ==
=== Year-by-year ===
As of March 2, 2025

Season	USL League One								Playoffs	US Open Cup	Top Scorer	
Season	P	W	D	L	GF	GA	Pts	Position	Playoffs	US Open Cup	Player	Goals
2020	16	5	3	8	19	26	18	9th	Did not qualify	Did not enter *	(Brazil) Nicolas Firmino (United States) Justin Rennicks	4
2021	28	11	4	13	33	39	37	8th	Did not qualify	Did not enter *	(United States) Damian Rivera	6
*As a fully owned and operated MLS reserve team, New England Revolution II is ineligible to enter the U.S. Open Cup.

Season	MLS Next Pro									Playoffs	Top Scorer	
Season	P	W	D	L	GF	GA	Pts	Conference	Overall	Playoffs	Player	Goals
2022	24	9	5	10	27	42	33	7th, Eastern	13th	Did not qualify	(Brazil) Marcos Dias	6
2023	28	14	8	6	57	41	50	2nd, Eastern	4th	Conference Finals	(United States) Jordan Adebayo-Smith	12
2024	28	4	6	18	37	59	22	15th, Eastern	29th	Did not qualify	(Brazil) Marcos Dias	9
2025	28	14	7	7	54	37	54	3rd, Eastern	4th	Conference Quarterfinals	(Guyana) Liam Butts	13
2026	28	12	8	8	47	42	48	5th, Eastern	9th	TBA	(Canada) Myles Morgan	14
*As a fully owned and operated MLS reserve team, New England Revolution II is ineligible to enter the U.S. Open Cup.

=== Head coaches record ===
As of August 19, 2026

Name	Nationality	From	To	P	W	D	L	GF	GA	Win%
Clint Peay	United States	September 11, 2018	October 14, 2023	96	39	20	37	136	148	40.63
Richie Williams	United States	January 17, 2024	November 5, 2025	57	18	13	26	91	97	31.58
Pablo Moreira	Uruguay	January 3, 2026	present	28	12	8	8	47	42	42.86

== See also ==
- New England Revolution
- USL League One
- MLS Next Pro
