= 2026 MLS Next Pro season =

MLS Next Pro
- Season: 2026
- Dates: February 27 – September 20 (regular season); October 11 – November 8 (playoffs)
- Champions: Chattanooga FC (1st title)
- Regular season title: Austin FC II (1st title)
- Matches: 420
- Goals: 1,400 (3.33 per match)
- Best player: (United States) Arif Kovac (Atlanta United 2)
- Top goalscorer: (United States) Arif Kovac (Atlanta United 2) (20 goals)
- Best goalkeeper: (United States) Sam Joseph (Portland Timbers 2)
- Biggest home win: 5 goal difference (11 games) (Note: Crown Legacy FC 7–2 Huntsville City FC (March 6) Houston Dynamo 2 5–0 Portland Timbers 2 (March 15) FC Cincinnati 2 5–0 Toronto FC II (May 3) San Jose Earthquakes II 6–1 Whitecaps FC 2 (May 9) Red Bull New York II 5–0 Toronto FC II (June 21) Red Bull New York II 5–0 Philadelphia Union II (June 28) San Jose Earthquakes II 6–1 Sporting KC II (July 7) Ventura County FC 6–1 North Texas SC (July 31) Chicago Fire FC II 7–2 FC Cincinnati 2 (August 2) NYCFC II 5–0 FC Cincinnati 2 (August 19) CT United FC 7–2 Inter Miami CF II (September 20))
- Biggest away win: Sporting KC II 0–5 Real Monarchs (March 8); NYCFC II 0–5 Toronto FC II (March 19)
- Highest scoring: Crown Legacy FC 7–2 Huntsville City FC (March 6); Chicago Fire FC II 7–2 FC Cincinnati 2 (August 2); CT United FC 7–2 Inter Miami CF II (September 20)
- Longest winning run: 10 games Austin FC II (May 2 – July 5) (league record)
- Longest unbeaten run: 16 games Austin FC II (March 8 – July 5)
- Longest winless run: 17 games Inter Miami CF II
- Longest losing run: 6 games Whitecaps FC 2
- Highest attendance: 6,107; Chattanooga FC 1–0 Inter Miami CF II (July 4)
- All statistics correct as of September 20, 2026.

The 2026 MLS Next Pro season was the fifth season of MLS Next Pro, the second-tier league of Major League Soccer. The regular season began on February 27 and ended on September 20, with playoffs following from October 11 to November 8. Chattanooga FC became the first independent team to win the MLS Next Pro Cup by defeating Los Angeles FC 2 in the final.

== Teams ==
=== Stadiums and locations ===
Team	Stadium	Capacity
Atlanta United 2	Fifth Third Stadium	10,200
Austin FC II	Parmer Field	1,000
Carolina Core FC	Truist Point	4,500
Chattanooga FC	Finley Stadium	20,412
Chicago Fire FC II	SeatGeek Stadium	20,000
FC Cincinnati 2	NKU Soccer Stadium	1,000
Colorado Rapids 2	Denver Soccer Stadium	2,000
Columbus Crew 2	Historic Crew Stadium	19,968
Crown Legacy FC	Sportsplex at Matthews	5,000
CT United FC	Morrone Stadium Reese Stadium	5,300 3,000
Houston Dynamo 2	SaberCats Stadium	3,200
Huntsville City FC	Joe W. Davis Stadium	6,000
Inter Miami CF II	Chase Stadium	21,000
Los Angeles FC 2	Titan Stadium	10,000
Minnesota United FC 2	National Sports Center	5,500
New England Revolution II	Beirne Stadium	4,400
New York City FC II	Belson Stadium	2,168
New York Red Bulls II	MSU Soccer Park at Pittser Field	5,000
North Texas SC	Texas Health Mansfield Stadium	7,000
Orlando City B	Osceola County Stadium	5,300
Philadelphia Union II	Subaru Park	18,500
Portland Timbers 2	Providence Park	25,218
Real Monarchs	Zions Bank Stadium	5,000
San Jose Earthquakes II	Saint Mary's Stadium	5,500
Sporting Kansas City II	Swope Soccer Village	3,500
St. Louis City 2	Energizer Park	22,423
Tacoma Defiance	Starfire Sports Complex	4,500
Toronto FC II	York Lions Stadium	4,000
Ventura County FC	William Rolland Stadium	3,000
Whitecaps FC 2	Swangard Stadium	5,288

=== Personnel and sponsorship ===
Team	Head coach	Sponsors
Atlanta United 2	(Spain) Jose Silva Caparros	Emory Healthcare
Austin FC II	(England) Jason Shackell	—
Carolina Core FC	(United States) Jake Davis (interim)	Go-Fourth Home Services
Chattanooga FC	(England) Richard Dixon (interim)	Erlanger Health
Chicago Fire FC II	(United States) Mike Matkovich	Carvana
FC Cincinnati 2	(United States) Sammy Castellanos	—
Colorado Rapids 2	(United States) Erik Bushey	University of Colorado Health
Columbus Crew 2	(United States) Chris Rogers (interim)	OhioHealth
Crown Legacy FC	(United States) Kevin Sawchak	Ally Financial
CT United FC	(Jamaica) Shavar Thomas	PHYND
Houston Dynamo 2	(United States) Jeremy Hurdle	—
Huntsville City FC	(United States) Chris O'Neal	Renasant Bank
Inter Miami CF II	(Argentina) Cristian Ledesma	—
Los Angeles FC 2	(United States) Fabian Sandoval	—
Minnesota United FC 2	(Nigeria) Fanendo Adi	—
New England Revolution II	(United States) Pablo Moreira	—
New York City FC II	(United States) Matt Pilkington	—
New York Red Bulls II	(Germany) Dominik Wohlert	Red Bull
North Texas SC	(Wales) John Gall	Children's Health UT-Southwestern
Orlando City B	(United States) Julian Vergara (interim)	Orlando Health
Philadelphia Union II	(United States) Ryan Richter	Bimbo Bakeries
Portland Timbers 2	(Canada) Serge Dinkota	—
Real Monarchs	(England) Mark Lowry	Makers Line
San Jose Earthquakes II	(United States) Dan DeGeer	—
Sporting Kansas City II	(United States) Lee Tschantret	Central Bank of the Midwest
St. Louis City 2	(England) David Critchley	—
Tacoma Defiance	(Brazil) Paulo Nagamura	MultiCare Health System
Toronto FC II	(Canada) Gianni Cimini	BMO
Ventura County FC	(United States) Matt Taylor	Ventura County Credit Union
Whitecaps FC 2	(Canada) Rich Fagan	TELUS

=== Coaching changes ===
Team	Outgoing coach	Manner of departure	Date of vacancy	Position in table	Incoming coach	Date of appointment
Austin FC II	(United States) Brett Uttley	Contract expired	November 21, 2025	9th in West	(England) Jason Shackell	November 21, 2025
Atlanta United 2	(England) Steve Cooke	Left to join Lexington SC	July 23, 2025	10th in East	(Spain) Jose Silva Caparros	December 15, 2025
New England Revolution II	(United States) Richie Williams	Contract expired	November 5, 2025	3rd in East	(United States) Pablo Moreira	December 3, 2025
FC Cincinnati 2	(Jamaica) Tyrone Marshall	Not retained	December 8, 2025	7th in East	(United States) Sammy Castellanos	January 8, 2026
Minnesota United FC 2	(United States) Jeremy Hall	Left to join the United States U18	January 7, 2026	11th in West	(Nigeria) Fanendo Adi	January 15, 2026
New York Red Bulls II	(United States) Michael Bradley	Promoted to first team	December 15, 2025	1st in East	(Germany) Dominik Wohlert	January 21, 2026
Crown Legacy FC	(Republic of Ireland) Gary Dicker	Promoted to first team	January 21, 2026	13th in East	(United States) Kevin Sawchak	January 21, 2026
Portland Timbers 2	(Canada) Serge Dinkota	Option Declined	October 13, 2025	10th in West	(Republic of Ireland) Jack Cassidy	January 28, 2026
Chattanooga FC	(England) Chris Nugent	Mutual parting	February 2, 2026	4th in East	(Jamaica) Richard Dixon (interim)	February 2, 2026
Sporting Kansas City II	(Hungary) István Urbányi	Relieved of duties	August 12, 2025	14th in West	(United States) Lee Tschantret	February 3, 2026
Tacoma Defiance	(South Africa) Hervé Diese	Relieved of duties	July 23, 2025	12th in West	(Brazil) Paulo Nagamura	February 3, 2026
Los Angeles FC 2	(United States) Junior Gonzalez	Not retained	December 23, 2025	13th in West	(United States) Fabian Sandoval	February 11, 2026
Whitecaps FC 2	(United States) Ricardo Clark	Left to join Seattle Sounders FC	January 12, 2026	7th in West	(Canada) Rich Fagan	February 25, 2026
Orlando City B	(Argentina) Manuel Goldberg	Promoted to first team assistant	March 11, 2026	11th in East	(United States) Julian Vergara (interim)	March 11, 2026
Carolina Core FC	(Jamaica) Donovan Ricketts	Reorganization	May 26, 2026	14th in East	(United States) Jake Davis (interim)	May 26, 2026
Columbus Crew 2	(Argentina) Federico Higuain	Fired for physical abuse and sexism to a female referee.	September 22, 2026	4th in East	(United States) Chris Rogers (interim)	September 23, 2026

== Regular season ==
Each team plays 28 matches during the regular season in a mostly regionalized schedule. Each conference is divided into divisions of seven or eight teams for scheduling. The top nine teams in each conference qualify for the playoffs, up from eight teams as was the case in previous seasons.

=== Conference standings ===
==== Eastern Conference ====
Pos	Div	Team	Pld	W	SOW	SOL	L	GF	GA	GD	Pts	Qualification
1	SE	Crown Legacy FC	28	15	5	3	5	67	39	+28	58	Round one
2	SE	Chattanooga FC	28	15	4	3	6	56	39	+17	56	Round one
3	SE	Atlanta United 2	28	14	1	4	9	62	46	+16	48	Round one
4	NE	Columbus Crew 2	28	12	5	2	9	49	43	+6	48	Round one
5	NE	New England Revolution II	28	12	4	4	8	47	42	+5	48	Round one
6	NE	New York City FC II	28	13	3	2	10	50	44	+6	47	Round one
7	NE	CT United FC	28	14	2	0	12	59	52	+7	46	Round one
8	NE	New York Red Bulls II	28	13	2	3	10	58	48	+10	46	Wild card round
9	SE	Huntsville City FC	28	12	2	4	10	49	47	+2	44	Wild card round
10	SE	Orlando City B	28	11	4	3	10	55	56	−1	44	
11	NE	Philadelphia Union II	28	12	2	3	11	37	40	−3	43	
12	NE	Toronto FC II	28	11	2	2	13	48	56	−8	39	
13	SE	Chicago Fire FC II	28	10	3	3	12	50	48	+2	39	
14	SE	Carolina Core FC	28	5	5	6	12	40	53	−13	31	
15	NE	FC Cincinnati 2	28	5	2	1	20	32	62	−30	20	
16	SE	Inter Miami CF II	28	3	1	4	20	30	74	−44	15	

Source: MLSNP
Rules for classification: 1) Points; 2) Total regulation wins; 3) Total goal differential; 4) Total goals scored; 5) Total shootout wins; 6) Away goal differential; 7) Away goals scored; 8) Home goals differential; 9) Home goals scored; 10) Fewer disciplinary points; 11) Drawing of lots.

==== Western Conference ====
Pos	Div	Team	Pld	W	SOW	SOL	L	GF	GA	GD	Pts	Qualification
1	FR	Austin FC II	28	19	2	4	3	54	21	+33	65	Round one
2	PC	Portland Timbers 2	28	14	5	5	4	37	29	+8	57	Round one
3	PC	Ventura County FC	28	14	4	3	7	58	36	+22	53	Round one
4	FR	Houston Dynamo 2	28	14	4	2	8	52	32	+20	52	Round one
5	FR	Minnesota United FC 2	28	12	3	3	10	43	39	+4	45	Round one
6	PC	Los Angeles FC 2	28	11	3	6	8	50	48	+2	45	Round one
7	FR	St. Louis City 2	28	10	4	6	8	42	40	+2	44	Round one
8	PC	San Jose Earthquakes II	28	11	3	3	11	51	36	+15	42	Wild card round
9	PC	Tacoma Defiance	28	11	3	2	12	40	44	−4	41	Wild card round
10	FR	North Texas SC	28	8	6	4	10	41	41	0	40	
11	PC	Real Monarchs	28	8	4	1	15	38	55	−17	33	
12	PC	Whitecaps FC 2	28	6	4	1	17	39	62	−23	27	
13	FR	Sporting Kansas City II	28	6	1	3	18	36	75	−39	23	
14	FR	Colorado Rapids 2	28	4	2	5	17	28	51	−23	21	

Source: MLSNP
Rules for classification: 1) Points; 2) Total regulation wins; 3) Total goal differential; 4) Total goals scored; 5) Total shootout wins; 6) Away goal differential; 7) Away goals scored; 8) Home goals differential; 9) Home goals scored; 10) Fewer disciplinary points; 11) Drawing of lots.

==== Overall table ====
Pos	Div	Team	Pld	W	SOW	SOL	L	GF	GA	GD	Pts	Awards
1	FR	Austin FC II (C)	28	19	2	4	3	54	21	+33	65	Regular season champion
2	SE	Crown Legacy FC	28	15	5	3	5	67	39	+28	58	
3	PC	Portland Timbers 2	28	14	5	5	4	37	29	+8	57	
4	SE	Chattanooga FC	28	15	4	3	6	56	39	+17	56	
5	PC	Ventura County FC	28	14	4	3	7	58	36	+22	53	
6	FR	Houston Dynamo 2	28	14	4	2	8	53	33	+20	52	
7	SE	Atlanta United 2	28	14	1	4	9	62	46	+16	48	
8	NE	Columbus Crew 2	28	12	5	2	9	49	43	+6	48	
9	NE	New England Revolution II	28	12	4	4	8	47	42	+5	48	
10	NE	New York City FC II	28	13	3	2	10	50	44	+6	47	
11	NE	CT United FC	28	14	2	0	12	59	52	+7	46	
12	NE	New York Red Bulls II	28	13	2	3	10	58	48	+10	46	
13	FR	Minnesota United FC 2	28	12	3	3	10	43	39	+4	45	
14	PC	Los Angeles FC 2	28	11	3	6	8	50	48	+2	45	
15	SE	Huntsville City FC	28	12	2	4	10	49	47	+2	44	
16	SE	Orlando City B	28	11	4	3	10	55	56	−1	44	
17	FR	St. Louis City 2	28	10	4	6	8	42	40	+2	44	
18	NE	Philadelphia Union II	28	12	2	3	11	37	40	−3	43	
19	PC	San Jose Earthquakes II	28	11	3	3	11	51	36	+15	42	
20	PC	Tacoma Defiance	28	11	3	2	12	40	44	−4	41	
21	FR	North Texas SC	28	8	6	4	10	42	41	+1	40	
22	NE	Toronto FC II	28	11	2	2	13	48	56	−8	39	
23	SE	Chicago Fire FC II	28	10	3	3	12	50	48	+2	39	
24	PC	Real Monarchs	28	8	4	1	15	38	55	−17	33	
25	SE	Carolina Core FC	28	5	5	6	12	40	53	−13	31	
26	PC	Whitecaps FC 2	28	6	4	1	17	39	62	−23	27	
27	FR	Sporting Kansas City II	28	6	1	3	18	36	75	−39	23	
28	FR	Colorado Rapids 2	28	4	2	5	17	28	52	−24	21	
29	NE	FC Cincinnati 2	28	5	2	1	20	32	62	−30	20	
30	SE	Inter Miami CF II	28	3	1	4	20	30	74	−44	15	

Source: MLSNP
Rules for classification: 1) Points; 2) Total regulation wins; 3) Total goal differential; 4) Total goals scored; 5) Total shootout wins; 6) Away goal differential; 7) Away goals scored; 8) Home goals differential; 9) Home goals scored; 10) Fewer disciplinary points; 11) Drawing of lots.
(C) Champion

== Player statistics ==
As of September 20, 2026

=== Goals ===
Rank	Player	Club	Goals
1	(United States) Arif Kovac	Atlanta United 2	20
2	(United States) Alex Krehl	Chattanooga FC	18
3	(Hungary) Barnabas Tanyi	CT United FC	16
4	(Canada) Myles Morgan	New England Revolution II	14
4	(Canada) Hugo Mbongue	Crown Legacy FC	14
6	(United States) Austin Brummett	Houston Dynamo 2	13
6	(United States) Mark Bronnik	Tacoma Defiance	13
6	(United States) Julian Placias	Ventura County FC	13
9	(United States) Darius Randell	Minnesota United FC 2	12
9	(Central African Republic) Arnaud Tattevin	Carolina Core FC	12
9	(United States) Zachary Bohane	San Jose Earthquakes II	12
9	(Ivory Coast) Kevin Gbamblé	Columbus Crew 2	12

=== Hat-tricks ===
Player	Team	Against	Score	Date
(Canada) Marcus Caldeira	Minnesota United FC 2	Austin FC II	2–4 (A)	March 1
(Belgium) Edouard Nys	North Texas SC	Colorado Rapids 2	3–1 (H)	March 7
(United States) Arif Kovac5	Atlanta United 2	Huntsville City FC	2–6 (A)	May 16
(Trinidad and Tobago) Nathaniel James	North Texas SC	Sporting KC II	5–1 (H)	May 16
(Canada) Marcus Caldeira	Minnesota United FC 2	St. Louis City 2	5–2 (H)	June 20
(United States) Dennis Nelich	Red Bull New York II	Philadelphia Union II	5–0 (H)	June 28
(United States) Eddy Davis III	Philadelphia Union II	New England Revolution II	0–4 (A)	July 5
(Central African Republic) Arnaud Tattevin	Carolina Core FC	Atlanta United 2	3–3 (A)	July 31
(United States) Jason Shokalook	Chicago Fire FC II	FC Cincinnati 2	7–2 (H)	August 2
(United States) Alex Krehl	Chattanooga FC	Carolina Core FC	5–2 (H)	August 29
(United States) Darius Randell	Minnesota United FC 2	Whitecaps FC 2	5–1 (H)	September 12
(Haiti) Bryan Destin	CT United FC	Inter Miami CF II	7–2 (H)	September 20
(Hungary) Barnabas Tanyi	CT United FC	Inter Miami CF II	7–2 (H)	September 20

Notes

(H) – Home team
(A) – Away team

Scored 4 goals.
Scored 5 goals.

=== Assists ===
Rank	Player	Club	Assists
1	(United States) Cameron Dunbar	Atlanta United 2	13
2	(Ivory Coast) Kevin Gbamblé	Columbus Crew 2	11
3	(United States) Nathan Richmond	Crown Legacy FC	10
4	(United States) Tate Robertson	Chattanooga FC	9
4	(United States) Riley Lynch	St. Louis City 2	9
6	(United States) Julian Placias	Ventura County FC	8
6	(United States) Charlie Gaffney	Tacoma Defiance	8
7	(Hungary) Barnabas Tanyi	CT United FC	7
7	(Belgium) Edouard Nys	North Texas SC	7
7	(United States) Palmer Ault	St. Louis City 2	7
7	(Philippines) Alex Monis	CT United FC	7
7	(United States) Daniel D'lppolito	CT United FC	7
7	(Ghana) Issah Haruna	Orlando City B	7
7	(Mexico) Damyan Villanueva	Chicago Fire FC II	7
7	(Norway) Dennis Gjengaar	Red Bull New York II	7
7	(United States) Fletcher Bank	Toronto FC II	7
7	(Canada) Carson Rassak	Whitecaps FC 2	7
7	(United States) Daniel Mangarov	Chattanooga FC	7

=== Clean sheets ===
Rank	Player	Club	Clean sheets
1	(United States) Sam Joseph	Portland Timbers 2	12
2	(United States) Sebastian Conlon	Ventura County FC	8
2	(Switzerland) Eldin Jakupović	Chattanooga FC	8
2	(United States) Erik Lauta	Austin FC II	8
5	(England) Charlie Farrar	Austin FC II	7
6	(United States) Will Mackay	Huntsville City FC	6
6	(United States) Mac Learned	NYCFC II	6
6	(United States) Luke Pruter	Columbus Crew 2	6
6	(United States) Colin Welsh	St. Louis City 2	6
10	(Brazil) Pedro Cruz	Houston Dynamo 2	5
10	(United States) Nick Holliday	Carolina Core FC	5
10	(Canada) Max Anchor	Tacoma Defiance	5

== Playoffs ==
The playoffs feature 17 single elimination matches over four consecutive weekends, beginning October 11 and culminating with the MLS Next Pro Cup on November 8.

The top nine teams in each conference qualified for the playoffs. New in 2026, the play-in round saw teams ranked 8th and 9th contest each other to advance as the eighth seed. Matchups during the next two rounds were determined through the pick-your-opponent format within each conference. Firstly, teams ranked first, second, and third, in order of ranking, picked their opponent who must have been ranked fifth through eighth. In the next round, the highest ranked team remaining picked an opponent from the two lowest ranked teams remaining.

=== Bracket ===
Eastern Play-in Round (October 11)
E8	New York Red Bulls II	3
E9	Huntsville City FC	1

Western Play-in Round (October 11)
W8	San Jose Earthquakes II	4 (3)
W9	Tacoma Defiance	4 (1)

Conference Quarterfinals (October 16–18)	Conference Semifinals (October 25)
E1	Crown Legacy FC	2
E8	New York Red Bulls II	1
E1	Crown Legacy FC	1
E4	Columbus Crew 2	2
E4	Columbus Crew 2	2
E5	New England Revolution II	1
Eastern Conference
E2	Chattanooga FC	3
E6	New York City FC II	1
E2	Chattanooga FC	3
E7	CT United FC	1
E3	Atlanta United 2	0
E7	CT United FC	1
W1	Austin FC II	2
W8	San Jose Earthquakes II	1
W1	Austin FC II	0
W6	Los Angeles FC 2	1
W4	Houston Dynamo 2	2 (3)
W6	Los Angeles FC 2	2 (4)
Western Conference
W2	Portland Timbers 2	2
W7	St. Louis City SC 2	0
W2	Portland Timbers 2	0
W3	Ventura County FC	1
W3	Ventura County FC (a.e.t.)	3
W5	Minnesota United FC 2	2

Conference Finals (October 30 – November 1)
E4	Columbus Crew 2	2
E2	Chattanooga FC	3
W6	Los Angeles FC 2	1
W3	Ventura County FC	0

MLS Next Pro Final (November 8)
E2	Chattanooga FC	1
W6	Los Angeles FC 2	0

=== Play-in Round ===
October 11
5:00 PM EDT

New York Red Bulls II	3–1	Huntsville City FC
Jiménez 43'; Castro 45'; Rodriguez (yellow card) 76'; Dieujuste (yellow card) 80'; Rosborough 89'	Report	Yáñez 6'; Knight (yellow card) 25'; Barrett (yellow card) 53'; LeFlore (yellow card) 61'

MSU Soccer Park, Montclair, New Jersey
Referee: Elvis Osmanovic

October 11
5:00 PM PDT

San Jose Earthquakes II	4–4 (a.e.t.)	Tacoma Defiance
Allen 6', 61'; Bohane 11' (pen.); Mendoza (yellow card) 73'; Spivey 104'	Report	Alvarez (yellow card) 1'; Jauregui 38', 51'; Gaffney (yellow card) 72'; O'Neill 77' (yellow card) 102'; Lucero 111'
Penalties
Donnery (penalty scored); Mendoza (penalty scored); Bracken Serra (penalty missed); Bohane (penalty scored)	3–1	(penalty missed) Carli; (penalty scored) Robles; (penalty missed) Bonilla; (penalty missed) Winslow

PayPal Park, San Jose, California
Referee: John Matto

=== Conference Quarterfinals ===
October 16
6:00 PM EDT

Atlanta United 2	0–1	CT United FC
Senanou (yellow card) 80'; Cisset (yellow card) 90+13'	Report	Tanyi 5'

Children’s Healthcare of Atlanta Training Ground, Marietta, Georgia
Referee: Jaclyn Metz

October 16
7:00 PM PDT

Portland Timbers 2	2–0	St. Louis City 2
Kissel 12'; Joseph (yellow card) 62'; Santos 68'; Jura (yellow card) 86'; Guerra (red card) 90+3'; Enriquez (red card) 90+3'	Report	Pearson (yellow card) 6'; Zengue (yellow card) 17'; Reid-Brown (yellow card) 67'; McSorley (red card) 90+4'

Providence Park, Portland, Oregon
Attendance: 7,882
Referee: Lauren Aldrich

October 16
7:00 PM PDT

Ventura County FC	3–2 (a.e.t.)	Minnesota United FC 2
Ittycheria 21'; Dalgado 35'; Martinez (yellow card) 78'; Hernandez (yellow card) 88'; Vilamitjana 96'; Magaña (yellow card) 107'; Placias (yellow card) 113'	Report	Dieng 41' (pen.), 44'; Kabia (yellow card) 89'; Hille (yellow card) 120'

Dignity Health Sports Park, Carson, California
Referee: Servando Berna

October 17
3:00 PM EDT

Columbus Crew 2	2–1	New England Revolution II
Adu-Gyamfi 12'; Rincón 45'; Ruvalcaba (yellow card) 65'; Gbamblé (yellow card) 73'	Report	Wells 25'; Azar (yellow card) 45+4'

ScottsMiracle-Gro Field, Columbus, Ohio
Referee: Atahan Yaya

October 18
5:00 PM EDT

Chattanooga FC	3–1	New York City FC II
Krehl 31'; Sorenson 79'; Cohen 90+7'	Report	Santos (yellow card) 29'; Arroyave 53'

Finley Stadium, Chattanooga, Tennessee
Attendance: 3,131
Referee: Edson Carvajal

October 18
7:00 PM EDT

Crown Legacy FC	2–1	New York Red Bulls II
Richmond 12'; Mendoza 31' (yellow card) 34'	Report	Dieujuste (yellow card) 31'; Wender (yellow card) 48'; Rosborough 78'

Sportsplex at Matthews, Matthews, North Carolina
Referee: Robert Vincze

October 18
6:00 PM CDT

Houston Dynamo 2	2–2 (a.e.t.)	Los Angeles FC 2
Rivera 69', 74'	Report	Terry 12'; Aiyenero 54'; Kaplan (yellow card) 84'; D. Guerra (yellow card) 120'
Penalties
Mohammad (penalty scored); Rivera (penalty missed); André (penalty scored); Dohmann (penalty scored); Sousa (penalty missed)	3–4	(penalty scored) D. Guerra; (penalty missed) Nava; (penalty scored) Rodriguez; (penalty scored) Lambert; (penalty scored) Mardaresco

Shell Energy Stadium, Houston, Texas
Referee: Muhammad Hassan

October 18
7:30 PM CDT

Austin FC II	2–1	San Jose Earthquakes II
Chamberlain (yellow card) 46'; Bery (yellow card) 56'; Sall 58'; González (yellow card) 78'; Gryczewski 88'	Report	Heisner (yellow card) 19'; Bohane 24'; Cano (yellow card) 26'; Crockdord (yellow card) 58'; Mendoza (yellow card) 70'

Parmer Field, Austin, Texas
Referee: Carlos Rodriguez

=== Conference Semifinals ===
October 25
5:00 PM EDT

Chattanooga FC	3–1	CT United FC
Jones (yellow card) 59'; Robertson 61'; Krehl 70'; Louis-Jean 83'	Report	Sserwadda (yellow card) 60'; Tanyi 65'

Finley Stadium, Chattanooga, Tennessee
Attendance: 3,051
Referee: Gerald Flores

October 25
7:00 PM EDT

Crown Legacy FC	1–2	Columbus Crew 2
Richmond (yellow card) 46'; Mbongue 58' (pen.); Holt (yellow card) 88'	Report	Chirinos (yellow card) 45+1'; Forfor 49'; Adu-Gyamfi (yellow card) 51'

Sportsplex at Matthews, Matthews, North Carolina
Referee: Joe Surgan

October 25
7:30 PM CDT

Austin FC II	0–1	Los Angeles FC 2
Hot (yellow card) 65'	Report	Nava 90+2'

Parmer Field, Austin, Texas
Referee: Elton Garcia

October 25
7:00 PM PDT

Portland Timbers 2	0–1	Ventura County FC
Bamford (yellow card) 12'	Report	Vilamitjana 84'

Providence Park, Portland, Oregon
Attendance: 2,252
Referee: Edson Carvajal

=== Conference Finals ===
October 30
7:00 PM PDT

Ventura County FC	0–1	Los Angeles FC 2
	Report	Aiyenero 63'

Dignity Health Sports Park, Carson, California
Referee: Atahan Yaya

November 1
5:00 PM EST

Chattanooga FC	3–2	Columbus Crew 2
McGrath 45+3'; Barker John 71'; Sar-sar 90+5'	Report	Adams 12'; Gbamblé 31'; Nyeman (yellow card) 81'

Finley Stadium, Chattanooga, Tennessee
Attendance: 3,403
Referee: JC Griggs

=== 2026 MLS Next Pro Cup Final ===
November 8
6:00 PM EST

Chattanooga FC	1–0	Los Angeles FC 2
Barker John 31'	Report	Guerra (yellow card) 76'

Finley Stadium, Chattanooga, Tennessee
Attendance: 10,228
Referee: Rodrigo Albuquerque

== League awards ==
=== Individual awards ===
Award	Winner	Team	Ref.
Golden Boot	(United States) Arif Kovac	Atlanta United 2	
Playmaker of the Year	(United States) Cameron Dunbar	Atlanta United 2	
Defender of the Year	(France) Jules Bery	Austin FC II	
Goalkeeper of the Year	(United States) Sam Joseph	Portland Timbers 2	
Pathway Player of the Year	(United States) Justin Ellis	Orlando City B	
Goal of the Year	(United States) Jude Terry	Los Angeles FC 2	
Save of the Year	(United States) Lucas McPartlin	St. Louis City 2	
Coach of the Year	(England) Jason Shackell	Austin FC II	
Most Valuable Player	(United States) Arif Kovac	Atlanta United 2	

=== Best XI ===
Goalkeeper	Defenders	Midfielders	Forwards	Ref
(United States) Sam Joseph (PT2) (Goalkeeper of the Year)	(France) Jules Bery (ATX) (Defender of the Year) (United States) Dominik Chong Qui (AU2) (Denmark) Nicklas Lund (PT2)	(Spain) Jorge Alastuey (ATX) (United States) Palmer Ault (STL) (United States) Cameron Dunbar (AU2) (Playmaker of the Year) (United States) Eric Izoita (PT2)	(Ivory Coast) Kevin Gbamblé (CC2) (United States) Arif Kovac (AU2) (Golden Boot and MVP) (United States) Alex Krehl (CFC)	

=== Match Officials of the Year ===
Referee	Assistant Referee	Fourth Official	Ref.
Anthony Sobolevsky	Tyler Bost	Victor Borges	

=== Monthly awards ===
Week	Player of the Month		Rising Star of the Month		Goalkeeper of the Month		Coach of the Month		Team of the Month	Ref.
Week	Player	Club	Player	Club	Player	Club	Player	Club	Team of the Month	Ref.
March	(Benin) Rodolfo Aloko	Crown Legacy FC	(United States) Dylan Vanney	Ventura County FC	(Brazil) Pedro Cruz	Houston Dynamo 2	(United States) Jeremy Hurdle	Houston Dynamo 2	Crown Legacy FC	
April	(United States) Riley Lynch	St. Louis City 2	(United States) Dylan Vanney	Ventura County FC	(Brazil) Pedro Cruz	Houston Dynamo 2	(United States) Jeremy Hurdle	Houston Dynamo 2	Houston Dynamo 2	
May	(Canada) Van Parker	Real Monarchs	(United States) Erick Feliciano	Austin FC II	(United States) Erik Lauta	Austin FC II	(Uruguay) Pablo Moreira	New England Revolution II	Austin FC II	
June	(Canada) Marcus Caldeira	Minnesota United FC 2	(Canada) Carson Rassack	Whitecaps FC 2	(United States) Erik Lauta	Austin FC II	(England) Jason Shackell	Austin FC II	Austin FC II	
July	(Central African Republic) Arnaud Tattevin	Carolina Core FC	(United States) Matthew Jean Baptiste	New England Revolution II	(United States) Sam Joseph	Portland Timbers 2	(Jamaica) Shavar Thomas	CT United FC	Houston Dynamo 2	
August	(Hungary) Barnabás Tanyi	CT United FC	(United States) Liam Lambert	Los Angeles FC 2	(United States) Sam Joseph	Portland Timbers 2	(Jamaica) Shavar Thomas	CT United FC	Portland Timbers 2	
September	(United States) Darius Randell	Minnesota United FC 2	(United States) Jamil Danjaji	Columbus Crew 2	(England) Charlie Farrar	Austin FC II	(Jamaica) Richard Dixon	Chattanooga FC	Austin FC II	

=== Weekly awards ===
Week	Player of the Matchweek		Rising Star of the Matchweek		Goal of the Matchweek		Team of the Matchweek	Ref.
Week	Player	Club	Player	Club	Player	Club	Team of the Matchweek	Ref.
1	(Canada) Marcus Caldeira	Minnesota United FC 2	(United States) Dylan Vanney	Ventura County FC	(Philippines) Alex Monis	CT United FC	St. Louis City 2	
2	(Belgium) Edouard Nys	North Texas SC	(United States) Mattheo Dimareli	Houston Dynamo 2	(United States) Chris Aquino	Colorado Rapids 2	Crown Legacy FC	
3	(Benin) Rodolfo Aloko	Crown Legacy FC	(United States) Caleb Trombino	Orlando City B	(United States) Jacob Machuca	Los Angeles FC 2	Houston Dynamo 2	
4	(United States) Fletcher Bank	Toronto FC II	(United States) Lennon Harrington	Philadelphia Union II	(United States) Idoh Zeltzer-Zubida	Inter Miami CF II	San Jose Earthquakes II	
5	(Trinidad and Tobago) Nathaniel James	North Texas SC	(United States) Jacob Machuca	Los Angeles FC 2	(United States) Idoh Zeltzer-Zubida	Inter Miami CF II	Crown Legacy FC	
6	(United States) Zach Zengue	Columbus Crew 2	(Canada) Carson Rassak	Whitecaps FC 2	(Venezuela) Carlos Zambrano	New England Revolution II	Philadelphia Union II	
7	(Brazil) Pedro Cruz	Houston Dynamo 2	(United States) Kashan Hines	Sporting KC II	(Belgium) Eduoard Nys	North Texas SC	Atlanta United 2	
8	(United States) Riley Lynch	St. Louis City 2	(United States) Nicolas Lasheras	Orlando City B	(United States) David Duque	NYCFC II	Red Bull New York II	
9	(United States) Gabriel Bracken Serra	San Jose Earthquakes II	(United States) Dennis Nelich	Red Bull New York II	(Liberia) Anthony Sumo Jr.	Carolina Core FC	FC Cincinnati 2	
10	(United States) Shane de Flores	San Jose Earthquakes II	(United States) Luca Maxim	Orlando City B	(United States) Jude Terry	Los Angeles FC 2	Houston Dynamo 2	
11	(United States) Arif Kovac	Atlanta United 2	(United States) Erick Feliciano	Austin FC II	(United States) Christian Gallagher	Red Bull New York II	Austin FC II	
12	(Canada) Van Parker	Real Monarchs	(United States) Keane Perkins	Minnesota United FC 2	(Canada) Myles Morgan	New England Revolution II	Chicago Fire FC II	
13	(United States) Tega Ikoba	Sporting KC II	(Jamaica) Raequan Campbell-Dennis	Toronto FC II	(Argentina) Ignacio Gómez	Orlando City B	Orlando City B	
14	(United States) Dylan Vanney	Ventura County FC	(Puerto Rico) Matthew Belgodere	Orlando City B	(United States) Julian Donnery	San Jose Earthquakes II	Chattanooga FC	
15	(Central African Republic) Arnaud Tattevin	Carolina Core FC	(United States) Milan Napoe	Chicago Fire FC II	(United States) Jacob Ramírez	Orlando City B	Real Monarchs	
16	(Canada) Marcus Caldeira	Minnesota United FC 2	(Canada) Carson Rassak	Whitecaps FC 2	(United States) Diego Abarca	Austin FC II	Red Bull New York II	
17	(United States) Dennis Nelich	Red Bull New York II	(Mexico) Damyan Villanueva	Chicago Fire FC II	(United States) Camilo Ponce	NYCFC II	Red Bull New York II	
18	(United States) Edward Davis	Philadelphia Union II	(Mexico) Damyan Villanueva	Chicago Fire FC II	(Canada) Yuma Tsuji	Whitecaps FC 2	Houston Dynamo 2	
19	(United States) Arif Kovac	Atlanta United 2	(Puerto Rico) Matthew Belgodere	Orlando City B	(United States) Alejandro Flores	Inter Miami CF II	Chicago Fire FC II	
20	(United States) Dylan Lacy	CT United FC	(United States) Jamil Danjaji	Columbus Crew 2	(United States) Rafael Jauregui	Tacoma Defiance	Tacoma Defiance	
21	(United States) Arif Kovac	Atlanta United 2	(Canada) Sam Rogers	Whitecaps FC 2	(United States) Diego Abarca	Austin FC II	Chattanooga FC	
22	(Central African Republic) Arnaud Tattevin	Carolina Core FC	(United States) Matthew Jean Baptiste	New England Revolution II	(Canada) Myles Morgan	New England Revolution II	Ventura County FC	
23	(United States) Stas Korzeniowski	Philadelphia Union II	(Canada) Tristan Blyth	Toronto FC II	(Canada) Myles Morgan	New England Revolution II	NYCFC II	
24	(United States) Nighte Pickering	St. Louis City 2	(United States) Liam Lambert	Los Angeles FC 2	(United States) Robert Turdean	Chicago Fire FC II	Portland Timbers 2	
25	(Haiti) Bryan Destin	CT United FC	(United States) Benjamin Failla	Los Angeles FC 2	(United States) Jonny Lopez	NYCFC II	NYCFC II	
26	(Canada) Johnny Selemani	Whitecaps FC 2	(United States) Theo Reed	Philadelphia Union II	(United States) David Diaz	Carolina Core FC	Chattanooga FC	
27	(United States) Darius Randell	Minnesota United FC 2	(United States) Erick Lisboa Feliciano	Austin FC II	(United States) Bryce Boneau	Toronto FC II	Toronto FC II	
28	(United States) Darius Randell	Minnesota United FC 2	(United States) Liam Lambert	Los Angeles FC 2	(Belgium) Eduoard Nys	North Texas SC	Chattanooga FC	
29	(Chile) Zidane Yañez	Huntsville City FC	(United States) Nicholas Silva	Real Monarchs	(Denmark) Luca Costabile	Toronto FC II	CT United FC	

== See also ==
- 2026 Major League Soccer season
