= Canada men's national under-17 soccer team =

Canada Under-17
- Nickname(s): The Canucks, Les Rouges (The Reds)
- Association: Canadian Soccer Association
- Confederation: CONCACAF (North America)
- Head coach: Shane Lammie
- FIFA code: CAN
First colours	Second colours

First international
- Canada 3–3 Costa Rica (Mexico City, Mexico; May 13, 1985)

Biggest win
- Canada 10–0 Nicaragua (San Salvador, El Salvador; November 2, 1994)

Biggest defeat
- Canada 0-5 Brazil (Itu, Brazil; October 1, 2023)

FIFA U-17 World Cup
- Appearances: 9 (first in 1987)
- Best result: Round of 32 (2025)

CONCACAF Under-17 Championship
- Appearances: 18 (first in 1985)
- Best result: Runners-up (2011)

The Canada U-17 men's national soccer team (also known as Canada Under-17s or Canada U-17s) represents Canada in international soccer at this age level. They are overseen by the Canadian Soccer Association, the governing body for soccer in Canada.

Many of Canada's current internationals have played at one or more of these age levels early in their career, often working with the same coaches and teammates throughout their progression into the senior squad.

== History ==
The team has qualified for nine out of nineteen FIFA U-17 World Cups. On November 5, 2025, the Canada men's under-17 soccer team achieved its first-ever victory at a FIFA U-17 World Cup by defeating Uganda 2–1 in a match in Doha, Qatar. Elijah Roche scored the equalizer in the 88th minute, and Marius Aiyenero secured the win with a penalty kick in the 98th minute during stoppage time.

== Results and fixtures ==
The following is a list of match results in the last twelve months, as well as any future matches that have been scheduled.

Win Draw Loss Fixture

=== 2026 ===
February 6 2026 CONCACAF U-17 World Cup qualification	Cayman Islands	0–3	Canada	Alajuela, Costa Rica
03:00 PM		Report	Parker 17', 23'; Wood 59'	Stadium: Federation Field #1; Referee: Edson Lieveld

February 8 2026 CONCACAF U-17 World Cup qualification	Canada	5–1	Aruba	Alajuela, Costa Rica
03:00 PM	Parker 15'; Torres Cook 46', 68'; Belfon 65'; Breton 90+4'	Report	Carty 23'	Stadium: Federation Field #1; Referee: Melvin Orlando Matamoros Ponce

February 11 2026 CONCACAF U-17 World Cup qualification	Jamaica	3–1	Canada	Alajuela, Costa Rica
TBD	Nolan 37', 53'; Lyle 90+2'	Report	Parker 71' (pen.)	Stadium: Federation Field #1; Referee: César Nolasco

September 24 UEFA Friendship Cup 2026	Brazil	6–0	Canada	Nyon, Switzerland
TBD	Conceição 27'; Furquim 57' (pen.), 90+1'; Brendo 62'; Caramico 67', 88'	Report		Stadium: Centre sportif de Colovray

September 27 UEFA Friendship Cup 2026	Canada	1–1 (7–6 p)	Ivory Coast	Nyon, Switzerland
5:30pm	Laroche 36'	Report	Coulibaly 27' (pen.)	Stadium: Centre sportif de Colovray
	Penalties
	Kapor (penalty scored); Del Rio Pineiro (penalty scored); Brkic (penalty scored); Torres Cook (penalty scored); Farah (penalty scored); Makarova (penalty scored); Jamil Abubakar (penalty scored)		Penalty scored Penalty missed

September 30 UEFA Friendship Cup 2026	Spain	2–0	Canada	Nyon, Switzerland
11:00am	Cases 51'; Emeka 87'	Report	Keita (red card) 7'	Stadium: Centre sportif de Colovray

October 3 UEFA Friendship Cup 2026	Canada	4–2	Egypt	Nyon, Switzerland
9:00am	Kiede 38'; Blyth 44'; Belfon 61'; Makarova 90+3'	Report	Magdi (red card) 22'; Zaafran 48'; Hasseib 76'	Stadium: Centre sportif de Colovray

== Players ==
=== Current squad ===
The following 25 players have been called up for the UEFA Friendship Cup 2026, which will be held from February 2-11 2026 in Nyon, Switzerland. Drawn into Group B, Canada will play Brazil, Ivory Coast, and Spain on September 24, 27, and 30, respectively.

Caps and goals as of October 3, 2026, after the match against Egypt.

No.	Pos.	Player	Date of birth (age)	Caps	Goals	Club
1	GK	Samsy Keita	July 27, 2009 (age 17)	5	0	(Canadian Soccer Association) CF Montréal
12	GK	Benjamin MacKinnon	February 26, 2009 (age 17)	1	0	(French Football Federation) Cavigal Nice
	GK	William Ritchie^{ALT}		0	0	(The Football Association) Fulham FC
3	DF	Joseph Tchouta	2009	4	0	(Canadian Soccer Association) CF Montreal Academy
4	DF	Daniel Pribytov	2009	4	0	(Canadian Soccer Association) Cavalry FC
5	DF	Stefan Kapor (captain)	April 4, 2009 (age 17)	11	0	(Canadian Soccer Association) Toronto FC
6	DF	Edwin Omoregbe	January 4, 2009 (age 17)	8	0	(Canadian Soccer Association) Toronto FC Academy
14	DF	Ilan Hassan Farah	2009	5	0	(Canadian Soccer Association) HFX Wanderers
15	DF	Ulrich Zamble	February 17, 2009 (age 17)	4	0	(Canadian Soccer Association) CF Montréal Academy
16	DF	Rowan Montgomery	October 31, 2009 (age 17)	3	0	(German Football Association) SC Borea Dresden
18	DF	Quinton Belfon	April 27, 2009 (age 17)	7	2	(Canadian Soccer Association) Toronto FC Academy
2	MF	Barry Ogbolu	March 30, 2009 (age 17)	4	0	(United States Soccer Federation) LA Galaxy Academy
7	MF	Almedin Brkic	July 1, 2009 (age 17)	5	0	(Football Association of Bosnia and Herzegovina) FK Sarajevo Academy
8	MF	Eloi Breton	February 21, 2009 (age 17)	7	1	(Canadian Soccer Association) CF Montréal Academy
10	MF	Santiago Del Rio Pineiro	March 1, 2009 (age 17)	5	0	(Royal Spanish Football Federation) Valencia CF
13	MF	Vincente Lourenço	March 10, 2009 (age 17)	6	0	(Portuguese Football Federation) C.D. Santa Clara
17	MF	Prince Kiede	June 29, 2009 (age 17)	2	1	(Canadian Soccer Association) CF Montréal Academy
19	MF	Xavier Laroche	February 1, 2009 (age 17)	8	1	(Royal Spanish Football Federation) Levante UD
20	MF	Tristan Blyth	January 10, 2009 (age 17)	3	1	(Canadian Soccer Association) Toronto FC Academy
24	MF	Jamil Abubakar	April 19, 2009 (age 17)	5	0	(French Football Federation) Les Municipaux Le Havre
	MF	Artiom Bulat^{ALT}	August 3, 2009 (age 17)	0	0	(Royal Spanish Football Federation) Albacete Balompié
9	FW	Liam Torres Cook	August 29, 2009 (age 17)	6	2	(Royal Spanish Football Federation) CD Castellón
11	FW	Alexander Makarova	August 11, 2009 (age 17)	4	1	(Canadian Soccer Association) FC Supra
23	FW	Lucas Friend	August 14, 2009 (age 17)	5	0	(United States Soccer Federation) Nashville SC Academy
	FW	Jahziye Crooks-Foster^{ALT}	January 9, 2009 (age 17)	0	0	(Croatian Football Federation) NK Trnje
ALT = Alternate player

=== Recent call-ups ===
The following players have been called up for the team within the last twelve months.

Pos.	Player	Date of birth (age)	Caps	Goals	Club	Latest call-up
GK	Sam Rogers	June 22, 2009 (age 17)	0	0	(Canada) Whitecaps FC Academy	2026 CONCACAF U17 WC qualification
GK	Gabriel Hoffmeister Pandolfo	August 1, 2009 (age 17)	3	0	(Canada) CF Montreal Academy	2026 CONCACAF U17 WC qualification
GK	Jonathan Ransom	January 8, 2008 (age 18)	7	0	(United States) Atlanta United 2	2025 FIFA U-17 World Cup
GK	Milo Beimers	June 5, 2008 (age 18)	5	0	(Italy) Viterbese	2025 FIFA U-17 World Cup
DF	Alain Louima	May 6, 2009 (age 17)	1	0	(Spain) EF Huesca	2026 CONCACAF U17 WC qualification
DF	Silas Schoppitsch	June 29, 2009 (age 17)	3	0	Austria Wien II	2026 CONCACAF U17 WC qualification
DF	Lohamba Okoko	July 25, 2009 (age 17)	3	0	(United States) DC United Academy	2026 CONCACAF U17 WC qualification
DF	Sahil Deo	April 7, 2008 (age 18)	16	0	(Canada) Whitecaps FC 2	2025 FIFA U-17 World Cup
DF	William Daniels	May 4, 2008 (age 18)	11	2	(England) Leicester City Academy	2025 FIFA U-17 World Cup
DF	Sergei Kozlovskiy	June 18, 2008 (age 18)	12	5	(Canada) Atlético Ottawa	2025 FIFA U-17 World Cup
DF	Aidan Evans	November 1, 2008 (age 18)	11	10	(England) Fulham F.C. Academy	2025 FIFA U-17 World Cup
DF	Sasha Cernic	April 7, 2008 (age 18)	2	0	(Italy) Sampdoria Academy	2025 FIFA U-17 World Cup
MF	Niko Wood	January 12, 2009 (age 17)	3	1	(Netherlands) SC Heerenveen	2026 CONCACAF U17 WC qualification
MF	Raphael Pascal	February 4, 2009 (age 17)	2	0	(Canada) CF Montréal Academy	2026 CONCACAF U17 WC qualification
MF	Connor Rickert	August 1, 2009 (age 17)	2	0	(Spain) Marbella FC Academy	2026 CONCACAF U17 WC qualification
MF	Raffi Budd	April 6, 2010 (age 16)	2	0	(Wales) Cardiff City	2026 CONCACAF U17 WC qualification
MF	Dylan Judelson	June 5, 2008 (age 18)	15	0	(Italy) Genoa U20	2025 FIFA U-17 World Cup
MF	Josh-Duc Nteziryayo	November 15, 2008 (age 18)	10	0	(Canada) CF Montréal	2025 FIFA U-17 World Cup
MF	Kevin Khan	May 30, 2008 (age 18)	14	6	(Netherlands) Feyenoord Academy	2025 FIFA U-17 World Cup
MF	Richard Chukwu	February 25, 2008 (age 18)	27	1	(Canada) Toronto FC Academy	2025 FIFA U-17 World Cup
MF	Antone Bossenberry	August 14, 2008 (age 18)	4	0	(Canada) Toronto FC II	2025 FIFA U-17 World Cup
MF	Timothy Fortier	December 22, 2008 (age 17)	13	0	(Canada) Toronto FC Academy	2025 FIFA U-17 World Cup
MF	Elijah Roche	June 28, 2008 (age 18)	9	1	(Canada) Toronto FC Academy	2025 FIFA U-17 World Cup
MF	Aghilas Sadek	July 15, 2008 (age 18)	11	2	(Canada) CF Montréal Academy	2025 FIFA U-17 World Cup
MF	Sean Gormley^{ALT}	March 13, 2009 (age 17)	0	0	(United States) Inter Miami	2025 FIFA U-17 World Cup
FW	Tyler Brown	March 4, 2009 (age 17)	2	0	(Canada) Whitecaps FC Academy	2026 CONCACAF U17 WC qualification
FW	Van Parker	January 29, 2009 (age 17)	8	4	(United States) Real Salt Lake	2026 CONCACAF U17 WC qualification
FW	Diago Delgado	February 16, 2009 (age 17)	2	0	(Portugal) Rio Ave FC	2026 CONCACAF U17 WC qualification
FW	Shola Jimoh	April 8, 2008 (age 18)	14	4	(Canada) York United	2025 FIFA U-17 World Cup
FW	Marius Aiyenero	May 23, 2008 (age 18)	10	6	(United States) Los Angeles FC 2	2025 FIFA U-17 World Cup
FW	Yuma Tsuji-Yoshimoto	August 9, 2008 (age 18)	8	1	(Canada) Whitecaps FC 2	2025 FIFA U-17 World Cup
FW	Johnny Selemani	February 17, 2008 (age 18)	8	1	(Canada) Whitecaps FC 2	2025 FIFA U-17 World Cup
FW	Owen Graham-Roache^{INJ}	February 8, 2008 (age 18)	6	2	(Canada) Cavalry FC	2025 FIFA U-17 World Cup
FW	André Ali-Gayapersad^{INJ}	June 5, 2008 (age 18)	10	4	(Spain) Damm Academy	2025 FIFA U-17 World Cup
ALT = Alternate player; INJ = Injured player; PRE = Preliminary squad

== U-16 ==
=== Results and fixtures ===
The following is a list of Canada U-16 match results in the last twelve months, as well as any future matches that have been scheduled.

Win Draw Loss Fixture

==== 2025 ====
November 26 2025 Mexico 4 Nations Tournament	Costa Rica	1–1	Canada	Cuautlancingo, Puebla; Mexico
		Report	Schoppitsch 75'	Stadium: Unidad Deportiva San Juan Cuautlancingo

November 27 2025 Mexico 4 Nations Tournament	Canada	2–0	Dominican Republic	Cuautlancingo, Puebla; Mexico
10:30AM EST	Brown 25'; Del Rio Pineiro 73'	Report		Stadium: Unidad Deportiva San Juan Cuautlancingo

November 28 2025 Mexico 4 Nations Tournament	Mexico	3–2	Canada	Cuautlancingo, Puebla; Mexico
	Kimbrough 24', 26'; Omoregbe 90+' (o.g.)	Report	Louima (red card) 50'; Torres Cook 69'; Delgado 78'	Stadium: Unidad Deportiva San Juan Cuautlancingo

==== 2026 ====
August 20 Friendly	Chile	1–2	Canada	Santiago, Chile
3:00PM ET	Riveros	Report	Brodar; Jones	Stadium: ANFP Federación de Fútbol de Chile

August 23 Friendly	Chile	2–1	Canada	Santiago, Chile
11:00AM ET	Riveros 3'; Raipan 19'	Report	Onyeocha 90+1'	Stadium: ANFP Federación de Fútbol de Chile; Referee: Mauricio Burgos (Football Federation of Chile)

November 11 Friendly	Costa Rica	3–3	Canada	Alajuela, Costa Rica
11:00AM EST	Viana; Bills	Report	Montero; Mondy; Sequeira	Stadium: FCRF-Plycem Complex

November 14 Friendly	Canada	0–2	United States	Alajuela, Costa Rica
11:00AM EST		Report		Stadium: FCRF-Plycem Complex

=== Current squad ===
A 23-player squad was selected to represent Canada in friendly matches against Costa Rica and the United States on November 11 and 14, respectively.

Caps and goals as of November 14, 2026, after the match against the United States.

Head coach: (Canada) Mike Vitulano

No.	Pos.	Player	Date of birth (age)	Caps	Goals	Club
12	GK	Marko Kos	2010	2	0	(Canadian Soccer Association) Whitecaps FC Academy
21	GK	William Ritchie		1	0	(The Football Association) Fulham FC
	GK	Harrison Patterson	January 14, 2010 (age 16)	1	0	(Canadian Soccer Association) Toronto FC Academy
2	DF	Kacper Plocinski	July 1, 2010 (age 16)	3	0	(Canadian Soccer Association) Cavalry FC
5	DF	Niko Brodar	2010	4	1	(Italian Football Federation) Modena
6	DF	Manav Badwal	July 13, 2010 (age 16)	3	0	(Canadian Soccer Association) Whitecaps FC Academy
7	MF	Salomon Karlsson	January 23, 2010 (age 16)	1	0	(Swedish Football Association) Elfsborg
8	MF	Juliano Barbieri	May 4, 2010 (age 16)	3	0	(Canadian Soccer Association) CF Montreal Academy
9	MF	Rocco Viana	2010	4	2	(United States Soccer Federation) Austin FC
13	DF	John Chukwu	September 29, 2011 (age 15)	6	0	(Canadian Soccer Association) Toronto FC Academy
16	MF	Yanik Fleury	2011	2	0	(German Football Association) SV Darmstadt 98
22	MF	Hunter MacGowan	July 26, 2010 (age 16)	3	0	(Canadian Soccer Association) Whitecaps FC Academy
	DF	Henry Hudspith	January 4, 2010 (age 16)	2	0	(Canadian Soccer Association) Whitecaps FC Academy
	DF	Ivan Perkovic	February 16, 2010 (age 16)	0	0	(Croatian Football Federation) Hajduk Split
	DF	Ousmane Sangaré	January 16, 2010 (age 16)	0	0	(Canadian Soccer Association) CF Montréal
	DF	Fletcher Wellard	2010	2	0	(The Football Association) Charlton Athletic
11	MF	William Karras	2010	2	0	(Canadian Soccer Association) CF Montreal
	MF	Adam Amireh	October 29, 2010 (age 16)	2	0	(United States Soccer Federation) Colorado Rapids
	MF	Francesco Arrigoni	January 16, 2010 (age 16)	0	0	(Italian Football Federation) Genoa
	MF	Lucas Dawson	July 4, 2011 (age 15)	0	0	(Canadian Soccer Association) Toronto FC
	MF	Noah Messou	2010	0	0	(Canadian Soccer Association) Whitecaps FC Academy
10	FW	Ayden Bills	2010	3	1	(The Football Association) Walsall
19	FW	Sasha Romanov	2010	2	0	(Canadian Soccer Association) Toronto FC Academy
	FW	Antonio Morello	May 6, 2010 (age 16)	1	0	(Swiss Football Association) Lugano
	FW	Ethan Reid	August 22, 2010 (age 16)	0	0	(Canadian Soccer Association) Toronto FC

=== Recent U16 call-ups ===
The following players have previously been called up to the U-16 team, and are still eligible to play for Canada in the current U-20 World Cup cycle if they qualify.

Pos.	Player	Date of birth (age)	Caps	Goals	Club	Latest call-up
GK	Jolan Faury	February 14, 2010 (age 16)	1	0	(Canada) FC Supra	v. Chile, August 23, 2026
GK	Samsy Keita	July 27, 2009 (age 17)	2	0	(Canada) CF Montréal	2025 Mexico 4 Nations Tournament
GK	Sam Rogers	June 22, 2009 (age 17)	2	0	(Canada) Whitecaps FC Academy	2025 Mexico 4 Nations Tournament
DF	Noah Gauthier	2010	1	0	(Canada) CF Montreal	v. Chile, August 23, 2026
DF	Oriol Mensah	2010	1	0	(Canada) Whitecaps FC Academy	v. Chile, August 23, 2026
DF	Izaiyah Onomo	2010	0	0	(Canada) CF Montreal	v. Chile, August 23, 2026
DF	Khaleel Small	March 16, 2010 (age 16)	0	0	(Canada) Toronto FC Academy	v. Chile, August 23, 2026
DF	Leon Arkhurst	2009	3	0	(Canada) CF Montréal Academy	2025 Mexico 4 Nations Tournament
DF	Seyi Fakiyesi	January 6, 2010 (age 16)	3	0	(United States) Atlanta United Academy	2025 Mexico 4 Nations Tournament
DF	Sean Gormley	March 13, 2009 (age 17)	3	0	(United States) Inter Miami CF	2025 Mexico 4 Nations Tournament
DF	Ethan Heywood	October 5, 2009 (age 17)	1	0	(England) Reading	2025 Mexico 4 Nations Tournament
DF	Alain Louima	May 6, 2009 (age 17)	2	0	(Spain) SD Huesca	2025 Mexico 4 Nations Tournament
DF	Edwin Omoregbe	2009	4	0	(Canada) Toronto FC Academy	2025 Mexico 4 Nations Tournament
DF	Ulrich Zamble	February 17, 2009 (age 17)	1	0	(Canada) CF Montréal Academy	2025 Mexico 4 Nations Tournament
MF	John Alexis	February 15, 2010 (age 16)	2	0	(Canada) CF Montreal	v. Chile, August 23, 2026
MF	Raffi Budd	April 6, 2010 (age 16)	2	0	(England) Reading FC	v. Chile, August 23, 2026
MF	Matthew Jones	2010	2	1	(Canada) Whitecaps FC Academy	v. Chile, August 23, 2026
MF	Devonte Simon	March 16, 2010 (age 16)	2	0	(Canada) Toronto FC Academy	v. Chile, August 23, 2026
MF	Chimaobim Onyeocha	June 4, 2010 (age 16)	2	1	(Canada) Inter Toronto FC	v. Chile, August 23, 2026
MF	Akiz Aguma	2009	2	0	(Canada) Whitecaps FC Academy	2025 Mexico 4 Nations Tournament
MF	Eloi Breton	February 21, 2009 (age 17)	3	0	(Canada) CF Montréal Academy	2025 Mexico 4 Nations Tournament
MF	Santiago Del Rio Pineiro	March 1, 2009 (age 17)	6	1	(Spain) Valencia CF	2025 Mexico 4 Nations Tournament
MF	Xavier Laroche	2009	3	0	(Spain) Levante UD	2025 Mexico 4 Nations Tournament
MF	Zaky Lachhab	June 5, 2009 (age 17)	3	1	(Canada) CF Montréal Academy	2025 Mexico 4 Nations Tournament
MF	Christopher Lettieri	2009	5	0	(Italy) Delfino Pescara Calcio	2025 Mexico 4 Nations Tournament
MF	Matteo Rizzo	August 29, 2009 (age 17)	2	0	(Netherlands) FC Utrecht	2025 Mexico 4 Nations Tournament
MF	Silas Schoppitsch	June 29, 2009 (age 17)	2	1	FK Austria Vienna	2025 Mexico 4 Nations Tournament
MF	Liam Torres Cook	2009	1	1	(Spain) CD Castellón	2025 Mexico 4 Nations Tournament
MF	Niko Wood	January 12, 2009 (age 17)	5	0	(Netherlands) SC Heerenveen	2025 Mexico 4 Nations Tournament
FW	Tyler Brown	March 4, 2009 (age 17)	3	1	(Canada) Whitecaps FC Academy	2025 Mexico 4 Nations Tournament
FW	Diago Delgado	February 16, 2009 (age 17)	4	1	(Portugal) Rio Ave FC	2025 Mexico 4 Nations Tournament
FW	Kervon Kerr	March 15, 2009 (age 17)	4	0	(Canada) Toronto FC Academy	2025 Mexico 4 Nations Tournament
FW	Kunle Tokode	2009	1	0	(Canada) Whitecaps FC Academy	2025 Mexico 4 Nations Tournament

== U-15 ==
=== Results and fixtures ===
The following is a list of Canada U-15 match results in the last twelve months, as well as any future matches that have been scheduled.

Win Draw Loss Fixture

==== 2026 ====
August 19 Friendly	Chile	1–1	Canada	Santiago, Chile
11:00AM ET	Pérez	Report	Dawson	Stadium: ANFP Federación de Fútbol de Chile

August 22 Friendly	Chile	4–5	Canada	Santiago, Chile
11:00AM ET	Troncoso 21'; Delgado 53'; Aillapan 90' (pen.) 90+1'	Report	Dazirignon 19'; Egizii 25' (pen.); Dawson 50'; Legrand 74' (pen.); Boute 80'	Stadium: ANFP Federación de Fútbol de Chile; Referee: Eduardo Ponce (Chile)

October 24 2026 FIFA U-15 World Cup & Festival - Group P	Canada	1–2	Senegal	Hovsan, Azerbaijan
3:30HE	Dazirignon 25'	Report	Camara 9'; Sylla 17'	Stadium: Pitch 8A - Hovsan Competition Complex

October 25 2026 FIFA U-15 World Cup & Festival - Group P	Guatemala	1–1	Canada	Hovsan, Azerbaijan
3:30HE	De Coto 4'	Report	Camara 17'	Stadium: Pitch 6A - Hovsan Competition Complex

October 25 2026 FIFA U-15 World Cup & Festival - Group P	Singapore	0–6	Canada	Hovsan, Azerbaijan
9:00AM EST		Report	Camara 4'; Renardson 5'; Couto 10'; Egizii 19'; Pittarelli 28'; Rowen 17'	Stadium: Pitch 7A - Hovsan Competition Complex

October 26 2026 FIFA U-15 World Cup & Festival - Group P	Canada	20–1	American Samoa	Hovsan, Azerbaijan
1:00PM EST	Lafaele 1' (o.g.); Egizii 5', 15', 22', 23', 27'; Pittarelli 7', 21'; Dazirignon 14', 18', 26'; Parmar 17', 30', 32', 34', 34', 36'; Couto 31', 33'; Rowen 36', 39'	Report	Faaoga 12'	Stadium: Pitch 3A - Hovsan Competition Complex

October 26 2026 FIFA U-15 World Cup & Festival - Group P	Canada	1–3	Honduras	Hovsan, Azerbaijan
7:45AM EST		Report		Stadium: Pitch 6A - Hovsan Competition Complex

October 28 2026 FIFA U-15 World Cup & Festival - Tier D	Canada	4–0	Turkmenistan	Hovsan, Azerbaijan
2:15PM		Report		Stadium: Pitch 7A - Hovsan Competition Complex

October 28 2026 FIFA U-15 World Cup & Festival - Tier D	Canada	6–1	Andorra	Hovsan, Azerbaijan
2:15PM		Report		Stadium: Pitch 7A - Hovsan Competition Complex

October 29 2026 FIFA U-15 World Cup & Festival - Tier D	Canada	7–0	Burundi	Hovsan, Azerbaijan
1:00PM		Report		Stadium: Pitch 1A - Hovsan Competition Complex

October 29 2026 FIFA U-15 World Cup & Festival - Tier D	Canada	5–2	Somalia	Hovsan, Azerbaijan
1:00PM		Report		Stadium: Pitch 1A - Hovsan Competition Complex

October 29 2026 FIFA U-15 World Cup & Festival - Tier D	Canada	2–4	Tajikistan	Hovsan, Azerbaijan
1:00PM		Report		Stadium: Pitch 1A - Hovsan Competition Complex

=== Current squad ===
Canada Soccer has announced its 14-player roster for the Men’s U-15 National Team ahead of the first-ever FIFA U-15 World Cup & Festival Azerbaijan 2026™. The tournament runs from October 24 to 30 in Baku, Azerbaijan.

Caps and goals as of October 26, 2026, after the match against American Samoa.

Head coach: (Canada) M Alex Salvoni

No.	Pos.	Player	Date of birth (age)	Caps	Goals	Club
1	GK	Xavier Mcilkenny-McDonald	2011	4	0	(Canadian Soccer Association) Toronto FC
12	GK	Jaskaran Singh	2011	2	0	(Canadian Soccer Association) Whitecaps FC Academy
2	DF	Shawn Couto	2011	4	3	(Canadian Soccer Association) CF Montreal Academy
3	DF	Dionte Marhong	February 6, 2011 (age 15)	4	0	(Argentine Football Association) River Plate
4	DF	Elliott Kim	2011	5	0	(Canadian Soccer Association) Whitecaps FC Academy
5	DF	Mohamed Toure	2011	6	0	(Canadian Soccer Association) CF Montreal
7	DF	Quincy Green	2011	5	0	(United States Soccer Federation) LA Galaxy
6	MF	Michael Pittarelli	2011	4	3	(Canadian Soccer Association) CF Montreal Academy
8	MF	Hayden Renardson	March 29, 2011 (age 15)	5	1	(The Football Association) Aston Villa FC
10	MF	Aryan Parmar	February 10, 2011 (age 15)	7	8	(Royal Dutch Football Association) AZ Alkmaar
11	MF	Rowen Egharevba	2011	6	3	(Canadian Soccer Association) Cavalry FC
13	MF	David Egizii	August 13, 2011 (age 15)	6	7	(Italian Football Federation) Pescara Calcio
9	FW	Yele Dazirignon	2011	5	5	(Canadian Soccer Association) Whitecaps FC Academy
14	FW	Seri Yannick Baye	2011	5	0	(French Football Federation) FC Metz

=== Recent U15 call-ups ===
The following players have been recently called up to the Canada U-15 team and are still eligible.

Pos.	Player	Date of birth (age)	Caps	Goals	Club	Latest call-up
GK	Khalil Souani	2011	1	0	(Canada) CF Montreal	v. Chile, August 22, 2026
GK	Axel Battilana Gonzalez	2011	0	0	(Argentina) River Plate	v. Chile, August 22, 2026
DF	Alexandre Boute	July 19, 2011 (age 15)	2	1	(France) AS Saint-Étienne Academy	v. Chile, August 22, 2026
DF	John Chukwu (captain)	September 29, 2011 (age 15)	4	0	(Canada) Toronto FC Academy	v. Chile, August 22, 2026
DF	Cruz Nalder	2011	1	0	(Canada) CF Montreal	v. Chile, August 22, 2026
DF	Eoin Garner	2011	0	0	(Canada) CF Montreal	v. Chile, August 22, 2026
MF	Yanik Fleury	2011	2	0	(Germany) SV Darmstadt 98	v. Chile, August 22, 2026
MF	Jayden Awitor	2011	1	0	(Canada) Toronto FC	v. Chile, August 22, 2026
MF	Lucas Dawson	July 4, 2011 (age 15)	2	2	(Canada) Toronto FC	v. Chile, August 22, 2026
MF	Oliver Hirang McColl	2011	2	0	(Canada) Whitecaps FC Academy	v. Chile, August 22, 2026
MF	Murilo Nascimento	2011	1	0	(Brazil) Ibrachina	v. Chile, August 22, 2026
MF	Ilyes Lachhab	2011	2	0	(Canada) CF Montréal	v. Chile, August 22, 2026
MF	Yaseen Aboulaghed	2011	0	0	(Canada) AIFC	2025 Concacaf tournament in Costa Rica^{ALT}
FW	David Legrand	2011	2	1	(Canada) Toronto FC	v. Chile, August 22, 2026

=== Previous squads ===
FIFA U-17 World Cup

- 1987 FIFA U-16 World Cup squad
- 1989 FIFA U-16 World Cup squad
- 1993 FIFA U-17 World Cup squad
- 1995 FIFA U-17 World Cup squad
- 2011 FIFA U-17 World Cup squad
- 2013 FIFA U-17 World Cup squad
- 2019 FIFA U-17 World Cup squad
- 2023 FIFA U-17 World Cup squad
- 2025 FIFA U-17 World Cup squad

CONCACAF U-17 Championship

- 2009 CONCACAF U-17 Championship squad
- 2011 CONCACAF U-17 Championship squad
- 2013 CONCACAF U-17 Championship squad
- 2015 CONCACAF U-17 Championship squad
- 2017 CONCACAF U-17 Championship squad
- 2019 CONCACAF U-17 Championship squad
- 2023 CONCACAF U-17 Championship squad

== Coaching staff ==
=== Current staff ===
As of November 11, 2025.

Position	Name
National Team Head Coach	(Canada) Mike Vitulano
Goalkeeper Coach	(Canada) Luciano Lombardi
Video Analyst	(Canada) Tarik Agday

=== Coaching history ===
Brian Hughes, who served from 1985 to 1987, was the first coach of the Canada men's U-17 soccer team.

Caretaker managers are listed in italics.

- (Wales) Brian Hughes (1985–1987)
- (Austria) Bert Goldberger (1987–1994)
- (Scotland) Tony Taylor (1995–1996)
- (Trinidad and Tobago) Stephen Hart (2002–2007)
- (Canada) Sean Fleming (2011)
- (Canada) Paul Stalteri (2016–2017)
- (Canada) Andrew Olivieri (2019–2023)
- (Canada) Mike Vitulano (2024–present)

== Competitive record ==
Champions Runners-up Third place Tournament played fully or partially on home soil

=== FIFA U-17 World Cup ===
FIFA U-17 World Cup record
Year	Result	Position	Pld	W	D	L	GF	GA
(China) 1985	Did not qualify							
(Canada) 1987	Group stage	16th of 16	3	0	0	3	1	8
(Scotland) 1989	Group stage	16th of 16	3	0	0	3	1	9
(Italy) 1991	Did not qualify							
(Japan) 1993	Group stage	16th of 16	3	0	0	3	0	18
(Ecuador) 1995	Group stage	16th of 16	3	0	0	3	1	7
(Egypt) 1997	Did not qualify							
(New Zealand) 1999	Did not qualify							
(Trinidad and Tobago) 2001	Did not qualify							
(Finland) 2003	Did not qualify							
(Peru) 2005	Did not qualify							
(South Korea) 2007	Did not qualify							
(Nigeria) 2009	Did not qualify							
(Mexico) 2011	Group stage	19th of 24	3	0	2	1	2	5
(United Arab Emirates) 2013	Group stage	18th of 24	3	0	2	1	3	6
(Chile) 2015	Did not qualify							
(India) 2017	Did not qualify							
(Brazil) 2019	Group stage	22nd of 24	3	0	0	3	2	7
(Indonesia) 2023	Group stage	22nd of 24	3	0	0	3	1	10
(Qatar) 2025	Round of 32	TBD	4	1	2	1	4	4
(Qatar) 2026	Did not qualify							
Total	Round of 32	9/21	28	1	6	21	15	74

=== CONCACAF U-17 Championship ===
CONCACAF U-17 Championship record
Year	Result	Position	Pld	W	D	L	GF	GA
(Trinidad and Tobago) 1983	Did not enter							
(Mexico) 1985	Third place	3rd of 8	6	2	2	2	12	12
(Honduras) 1987	Did not enter							
(Trinidad and Tobago) 1988	Third place	3rd of 10	7	3	3	1	7	7
(Trinidad and Tobago) 1991	Group stage	6th of 12	3	1	1	1	1	1
(Cuba) 1992	Third place	3rd of 12	6	4	1	1	19	1
(El Salvador) 1994	Third place	3rd of 12	6	4	0	2	16	4
(Trinidad and Tobago) 1996	Fourth place	4th of 12	6	2	1	3	7	8
(Jamaica) (El Salvador) 1999	Group stage	6th of 8	3	1	0	2	6	6
(United States) (Honduras) 2001	Group stage	4th of 8	3	1	1	1	6	5
(Guatemala) (Canada) 2003	Group stage	5th of 8	3	2	0	1	4	3
(Costa Rica) (Mexico) 2005	Group stage	5th of 8	3	1	0	2	5	4
(Honduras) (Jamaica) 2007	Group stage	6th of 9	4	1	1	2	6	6
(Mexico) 2009	Group stage	7th of 8	3	0	1	2	4	7
(Jamaica) 2011	Runners-up	2nd of 12	5	3	1	1	11	3
(Panama) 2013	Third place	3rd of 12	5	2	2	1	10	7
(Honduras) 2015	Playoff round	5th of 12	6	3	1	2	10	9
(Panama) 2017	Group stage	7th of 12	3	1	0	2	4	4
(United States) 2019	Semi-finals	4th of 16	6	3	1	2	15	10
(Guatemala) 2023	Semi-finals	4th of 20	6	4	0	2	11	5
Total	Runners-up	18/20	84	38	16	30	154	102

== Honours ==
- CONCACAF Under-17 Championship
  - Runners-up (1): 2011
  - Third place (5): 1985, 1988, 1992, 1994, 2013

== See also ==
- Canada men's national soccer team
- Canada men's national under-23 soccer team
- Canada men's national under-20 soccer team
- Canada men's national under-15 soccer team
- Canada men's national futsal team
- Soccer in Canada
