= Jordan Ferrell =

American soccer coach and technical director

Personal information
- Date of birth: July 15, 1987 (age 39)
- Place of birth: Stockton, California

Team information
- Current team: AC Grand Rapids (assistant manager)

College career
Years	Team	Apps	(Gls)
2005–2008	Cal State East Bay Pioneers	65	(6)

Senior career*
Years	Team	Apps	(Gls)
2008–2009	Quelle Fürth		
2009–2010	SpVgg Ansbach		

Managerial career
- 2010: SpVgg Ansbach U-17 (assistant)
- 2011: Manteca FC (technical director)
- 2012–2013: San Joaquin Delta Mustangs
- 2013–2017: Pacific Tigers (assistant)
- 2017–2019: Sacramento Republic (academy)
- 2019: Oakland Roots (assistant)
- 2020: Oakland Roots
- 2020–2025: Oakland Roots (technical director)
- 2021: Oakland Roots (interim)
- 2021: Oakland Roots
- 2027–: AC Grand Rapids (assistant)
- * Club domestic league appearances and goals

Jordan Ferrell (born 1987) is an American soccer an assistant manager with MLS Next Pro club AC Grand Rapids.

== Playing career ==
Ferrell played four years of college soccer at Cal State East Bay Pioneers from 2005 to 2008. He was considered a leader for the team and during his final two years with the team he was the captain.

After graduating from college, Ferrell went on to play semi-professionally in Germany. While there he played for SG Quelle Fürth in the Landesliga Bayern-Mitte and SpVgg Ansbach in the Bayernliga. While his time in Germany was relatively short, it inspired him to get into coaching.

== Coaching career ==
=== Amateur and college ===
Ferrell began his coaching career while he was playing with SpVgg Ansbach in Germany. While he was still playing with the first team he took a job working as an assistant with the U-17 team. Ferrell described it as an eye opening experience and he engrossed himself in the German coaching methods. After he decided to retire from playing soccer professionally, Ferrell had the option to stay on as a coach with Ansbach in their youth academy, however, he decided to return to the United States and became the technical director of Manteca FC in 2011.

While still working at Manteca FC, Ferrell became the head coach of the men's soccer program at San Joaquin Delta College. In 2013, Ferrell joined the Pacific Tigers as an assistant coach for their men's soccer program. During his time as the assistant coach of the Tigers, Ferrell was also the technical director of the Central Valley Monarcas academy. He spent four seasons with the Tigers before moving on to join the Sacramento Republic's youth academy. Among other roles in Sacramento's academy, Ferrell was the head coach of both the U-17 and U-19 sides.

=== Professional ===
On July 5, 2019, it was announced that Ferrell would join the Oakland Roots a new professional club that would play in National Independent Soccer Association, a third-tier professional league. Ferrell joined head coach Paul Bravo, fellow assistant Larry Jackson, player-coach Víctor Bernárdez, and technical consultant Eric Yamamoto as Oakland's inaugural coaching staff.

On December 3, 2019, the Roots announced that Ferrell would serve as the team's new head coach after the team had parted ways with Bravo. In his first campaign in charge of the Roots, Ferrell lead the team to a 1-1-0 record in NISA's fall season. Ferrell further took the Roots to the NISA fall championship game, beating Chattanooga FC 3-2 and ultimately falling 2–1 to Detroit City FC in the championship.

On November 16, 2020, Ferrell was named technical director of Oakland Roots and first team assistant Dario Pot named manager. On April 25, 2021, Ferrell took over as interim head coach (while still technical director) after Pot and the club mutually parted ways. On May 20, 2021, the club removed the interim tag for the remainder of the 2021 season. After the signing of Juan Guerra as head coach, Ferrell was solely technical director again. On November 13, 2025, the Oakland Roots announced that Ferrell will depart from his role as technical director by mutual agreement at the end of year.

== Personal life ==
At the time of his appointment to be the head coach of the Oakland Roots, Ferrell was one of two African American head coaches among the 82 professional soccer teams in the United States.

In an article published on The Players' Tribune, Ferrell spoke about what it meant to be an American-born black coach in Oakland, California, a city that "prides itself on the strength and the voice of its black community. He wanted his side to make a positive difference in the aftermath of the murder of George Floyd. Ferrell started this by creating a space for his team to "be vulnerable, to be open and honest." He further announced that the entire Oakland Roots organization was joining Common Goal and would donate 1% of their salaries to organizations that use soccer to combat inequality and justice.
