= Lazar Kaličanin =

Serbian footballer (born 2004)

Personal information
- Full name: Lazar Kaličanin
- Date of birth: 21 May 2004 (age 22)
- Place of birth: Trstenik, Serbia and Montenegro
- Height: 1.89 m (6 ft 2 in)
- Position: Goalkeeper

Team information
- Current team: Crown Legacy (on loan from Čukarički)
- Number: 50

Youth career
- OFK Beograd
- 2018–2022: Čukarički

Senior career*
Years	Team	Apps	(Gls)
2022–	Čukarički	29	(0)
2022–2023	→ Smederevo 1924 (loan)	18	(0)
2026–	→ Crown Legacy (loan)	0	(0)

International career^{‡}
2019	Serbia U16	1	(0)
2020	Serbia U17	2	(0)
2021–2022	Serbia U18	2	(0)
2022	Serbia U19	4	(0)
2024–	Serbia U21	5	(0)
- * Club domestic league appearances and goals as of 10:19, 8 April 2026 (UTC) ‡ National team caps and goals as of 10:19, 8 April 2026 (UTC)

Lazar Kaličanin (Serbian Cyrillic: Лазар Каличанин; born 21 May 2004) is a Serbian professional footballer who plays as a goalkeeper for Crown Legacy on loan from Čukarički.

== Club career ==
Born in Trstenik, Kaličanin begin his career in the OFK Beograd young categories, Later he joined in tho the Čukarički youth academy.

In June 2018, Kaličanin signed his first professional contract with Čukarički, penning a four-year deal.

On 23 July 2022, Kaličanin was sent on an 18-month loan to Smederevo 1924, where he made his official senior debut. After promising performances in Smederevo, Kaličanin returned to Čukarički in December 2023.

On 25 May 2024, Kaličanin made his official debut for Čukarički against Red Star Belgrade in the last round of the 2023–24 Serbian SuperLiga play-off championship round.

In August 2024, Kaličanin, and fellow goalkeeper Vladan Čarapić, extended their contracts with Čukarički.

On 2 April 2026, Kaličanin joined MLS Next Pro side Crown Legacy on loan until 30 June 2026.

== International career ==
Kaličanin played for the Serbian national teams at U16, U17, U18, U19 and U21 levels.
