= Matthew Jones =

Matthew or Matt Jones may refer to:

== Arts and entertainment ==
=== Music ===
- Matthew Jones (activist) (1936–2011), African-American folk singer/songwriter
- Matthew Jones (musician) (born 1974), British violist, violinist and composer
- Matthew Floyd Jones, musician, writer and performer
- Matthew Perryman Jones (born 1973), American singer-songwriter
- Matt Jones, past member of the band Ultrasound

=== Other media ===
- Mathew Jones (born 1961), Australian and British artist
- Matt Chun, Australian illustrator and author, born "Matthew Jones"
- Matt Jones (actor) (born 1981), American actor and comedian
- Matt Jones (radio host) (born 1978), host and founder of Kentucky Sports Radio
- Matt Jones (writer) (born 1968), British television writer and television producer
- Matthew F. Jones (born 1967), American novelist

== Sports ==
=== American football ===
- Matthew Jones (offensive lineman) (born 1999), American football player
- Matt Jones (running back) (born 1993), American football running back
- Matt Jones (wide receiver) (born 1983), American football wide receiver

=== Association football ===
- Matt Jones (footballer, born 1970), English footballer formerly of Southend United
- Matt Jones (footballer, born 1980), Welsh international football player and manager
- Matthew Jones (footballer, born 1980), English football player for Shrewsbury Town
- Matt Jones (footballer, born 1986), English football goalkeeper for Belenenses
- Matty Jones (born 1995), English football player for Swindon Town

=== Other sports ===
- Matt Jones (basketball) (born 1994), American basketball player
- Matt Jones (Australian footballer) (born 1987), Australian rules footballer
- Matt Jones (golfer) (born 1980), Australian professional golfer
- Matt Jones (ice hockey) (born 1983), American ice hockey defenseman
- Matt Jones (rugby union) (born 1984), Welsh international rugby union player

== Others ==
- Matt Jones (interaction designer) (born 1968), Professor of Computer Science, Swansea University
- Matt Jones (American politician), American politician from Colorado
- Matt Jones (Canadian politician), member of the Alberta Legislature
- Matthew Jones (Welsh politician), member of the Welsh Senedd
- Matthew Jones (historian) (born 1966), London School of Economics
- Matthew L. Jones, American scientist and historian
- Matthew Jones (British Army officer), British general
