= Johnny Selemani =

Canadian soccer player (born 2008)

Personal information
- Full name: John-Vallery Selemani
- Date of birth: March 16, 2008 (age 18)
- Place of birth: Edmonton, Alberta, Canada
- Height: 5 ft 10 in (1.78 m)
- Position: Forward

Team information
- Current team: Whitecaps FC 2
- Number: 63

Youth career
- Blue Quill CL
- Edmonton Scottish
- Edmonton BTB SC
- 2022–2025: Vancouver Whitecaps FC

Senior career*
Years	Team	Apps	(Gls)
2024–	Whitecaps FC 2	35	(4)
2025	→ Vancouver Whitecaps FC (loan)	1	(0)
2026-	Vancouver Whitecaps FC	1	(0)

International career^{‡}
2025–	Canada U17	8	(1)
- * Club domestic league appearances and goals as of September 26, 2025 ‡ National team caps and goals as of November 14, 2025

John-Vallery Selemani (born March 16, 2008) is a Canadian soccer player who plays for Whitecaps FC 2 in MLS Next Pro.

== Early life ==
Selemani began playing youth soccer at age four with the Blue Quill Community League. He later played youth soccer with Edmonton Scottish and Edmonton BTB SC, before joining the Vancouver Whitecaps FC Academy in August 2022.

== Club career ==
On April 21, 2024, Selemani made his professional debut with Whitecaps FC 2 in MLS Next Pro, in a 0-0 draw with the Tacoma Defiance, becoming the youngest player to debut for the team at 16 years, one month and five days. On March 9, 2025, he scored his first professional goal in a match against Los Angeles FC 2. In June 2025, he signed a professional contract with Whitecaps FC 2 (after previously playing as an academy call-up). In June 2025, he signed a pair of short-term loans with the Vancouver Whitecaps FC first team. He made his Major League Soccer debut on June 14, 2025 against the Columbus Crew. On September 26, 2026 the Whitecaps FC announced they had signed Selemani to a contract as a Homegrown Player through the 2029-30 Major League Soccer season, with club options for the 2030-31 and 2031-32 seasons.

== International career ==
In August 2023, Selemani was selected as an alternate player for the Canada U15 for the 2023 CONCACAF Boys' Under-15 Championship.

In January 2025, Selemani was named to the Canada U17 roster for the 2025 CONCACAF U-17 World Cup qualification tournament. On February 11, 2025, he scored in an 8-0 victory over Anguilla U17 at the tournament.
