= Kevin Sawchak =

American soccer coach and former player (born 1988)

Personal information
- Date of birth: November 16, 1988 (age 37)
- Place of birth: Atlanta, Georgia, United States
- Height: 5 ft 9 in (1.75 m)
- Positions: Defender; midfielder

Team information
- Current team: Crown Legacy (assistant)

Youth career
- Concorde Fire
- –2007: Atlanta Fire

College career
Years	Team	Apps	(Gls)
2007–2010	UAB Blazers	74	(9)

Senior career*
Years	Team	Apps	(Gls)
2009–2010	Atlanta Blackhawks	22	(1)
2011–2012	MYPA	2	(0)
2012–2013	Ekenäs IF	26	(1)
2013	KooTeePee	24	(0)
2014	KTP	26	(0)
2015	Atlanta Silverbacks	1	(0)
2015	FC Honka	10	(0)
2019	Sudet	12	(1)
Total		123	(3)

Managerial career
- 2020–2021: Chattanooga Red Wolves (assistant)
- 2022: Northern Colorado Hailstorm (assistant)
- 2023–2025: Crown Legacy (assistant)
- 2026–: Crown Legacy
- * Club domestic league appearances and goals

Kevin Sawchak (born November 16, 1988) is an American soccer coach and former player who currently serves as a head coach for MLS Next Pro side Crown Legacy.

== Career statistics ==
=== Club ===
Club	Season	League			Cup		Continental		Other		Total	
Club	Season	Division	Apps	Goals	Apps	Goals	Apps	Goals	Apps	Goals	Apps	Goals
MYPA	2011	Veikkausliiga	2	0	0	0	–		0	0	2	0
Ekenäs IF	2012	Kakkonen	26	1	1 (Note: Appearances in the Finnish Cup)	0	–		0	0	27	1
KooTeePee	2013	Ykkönen	24	0	1	0	–		0	0	25	0
KTP	2014	Ykkönen	26	0	0	0	–		0	0	26	0
Atlanta Silverbacks	2015	NASL	1	0	0	0	–		0	0	1	0
FC Honka	2015	Kakkonen	10	0	0	0	–		0	0	10	0
