= FK Čukarički =

Serbian football club

Čukarički
- Full name: Fudbalski Klub Čukarički
- Nicknames: Čuka; Brđani (The Highlanders); Belo-crni (The White-Blacks)
- Founded: 4 July 1926; 100 years ago (as Čukarički SK)
- Ground: Čukarički Stadium
- Capacity: 4,070
- Chairman: Dragan Obradović
- Head coach: vacant
- League: Serbian SuperLiga
- 2025–26: Serbian SuperLiga, 8th of 16
- Website: fkcukaricki.co.rs
Home colours	Away colours

Fudbalski klub Čukarički (Serbian Cyrillic: Фудбалски клуб Чукарички) is a Serbian professional football club from Belgrade, more precisely from the Čukarica municipality, that currently plays in the Serbian SuperLiga, the top tier of Serbian football.

Founded in 1926, the club spent the first years of its existence in the amateur field. In the days of Yugoslavia, Čukarički played predominantly in the lower divisions of the country. The first notable achievements for the club were in the seasons of 1971–72, when they first reached the Yugoslav Second League, and 1993–94, when they reached, for the first time ever in the club's history, the national top tier of football, the Yugoslav First League, the first tier in the newly created Serbia and Montenegro. They played for the first time in the club's history on the European stage in the UEFA Intertoto Cup 1996 and the UEFA Intertoto Cup 1997

On 17 April 2012, the club was bought by Dragan Obradović, the owner of the Serbian construction and wholesale company ADOC. Since then Čukarički is the first ever professional football club in Serbia to have been privatized, and is also one of the first clubs in Southeast Europe which were ever bought. Since being bought the club has become one of the most stable and organised clubs in Serbian football and has competed in the Europa League on four occasions since 2014. The club won the 2014–15 Serbian Cup. Their highest league finish has been third, which they've achieved four times, in 2014–15, 2015–16, 2020–21 and 2021–22.

== History ==
=== Beginnings of Čukarički (1926–1942) ===
The club had emerged from Čukarica, more precisely in the working-class neighborhood of the Belgrade municipality, which is located on the right bank of the Sava River. The club was formed on 4 July 1926 during a meeting that took place in a restaurant named Majdan, where the club got its official name, ČSK–Čukarički sport klub, and the decision was made that the club colors should be black and white, a tradition which is still present. The first president was Miloš Ilić, known as the first Serbian aviator respectively combat pilots of the 1st class, and by that time a reservist of the Royal Yugoslav Air Force. The first players of the club were amateurs, which organized the pitch, made their own jerseys and nets.

ČSK started in the third league of the Belgrade League system, but in 1928 managed to promoted to the second Belgrade League, where the club was able to keep several seasons. In the season 1931–32, ČSK became champion and thus played from the next season in the Belgrad B-League, which they gained finally in 1935. So, the club celebrated its first decade of existence with championship success. During this first period of success, especially striker Aleksandar Petrović, called Pikavac, was one of the most important figures of the club. Coming from Palilulac Belgrade in 1932, he played in ČSK until 1936, when he was transferred to SK Jugoslavija, one of the major national clubs. As a member of the Yugoslavia national team, he is remembered as one of the best dribblers of Kingdom of Yugoslavia.

In 1936, ČSK entered to the Belgrade First A-League, which was one of the Yugoslav Second League's at that time, but relegated after two years. The generational change in the squad is considered to be the reason for such a bad season, but after only one year, the club was back and won immediately the championship. However, in that season the club was merged with FK Istra, a move that was not supported by many members of the direction board, and much less among the players. Because of this, local popularity fell and the vast majority of the players moved to neighbouring clubs Banovac, Makiš and Šećeranac. This made a stagnation in the club and during the following seasons the club did not compete in any level until 1942.

=== The club during the World War II (1942–1944) ===
During World War II, the Kingdom of Yugoslavia was invaded in April 1941 by the Axis powers and divided. Parts of Serbia fell to the Independent State of Croatia, the Kingdom of Hungary, or were under Nazi-Germany administration, among Belgrade, which was occupied by the Wehrmacht. Under difficult circumstances, it was permitted for certain clubs to play football, including ČSK. Already after the invasion, the club returned 1942 after six years of abstinence successfully in the competition and won the First Belgrade League, thus played next season in the Serbian League, the top national tier during the war. In the 1942–43 season the club finished 4th, a remarkable achievement because they finished in front of several favourites like Jedinstvo Belgrade or BASK.

In that period there was a popular domestic tournament named Letnji Pehar (Summer Trophy), where the best clubs competed like BSK, SK 1903, Obilić Belgrade and so also ČSK. Finally, the club defeated SK Banovac in the quarter-finals (2–1, 0–1), but lost against SK 1903 in the semi-finals (0–2, 0–2). The 1943–44 Belgrade First League season was formed by 10 clubs however after 8 rounds it was interrupted with ČSK placed as 6th. By the end of the war the club did not play under its name, only restoring its name in 1948 as FK Čukarički, now part of the Čukarički Sports Association.

=== From the subclass to the first league (1944–2003) ===
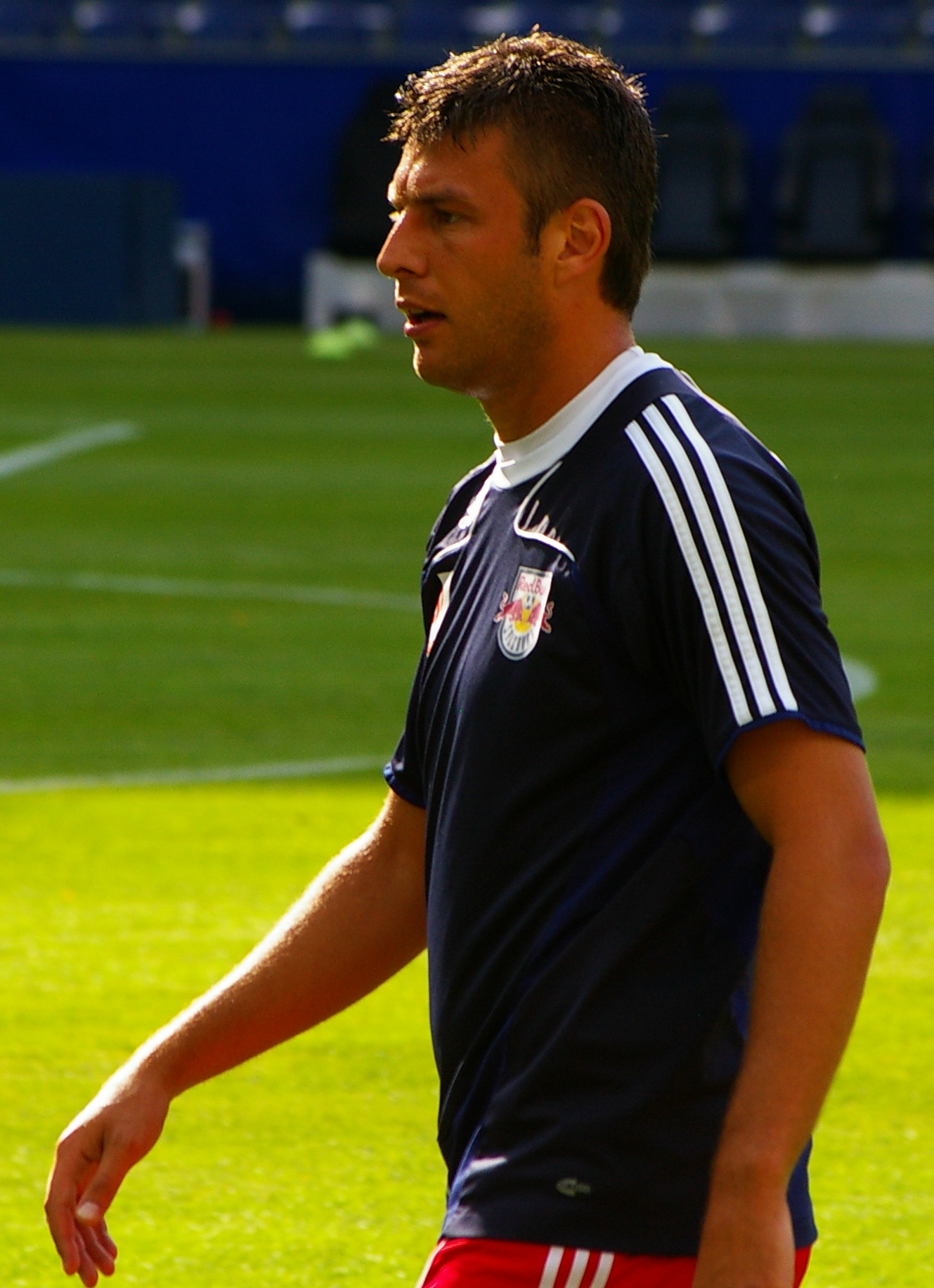
Ex-national player Milan Dudić started his professional career at Čukarički and played from 1999 to 2002 for the club.

In 1948, playing in the Belgrade Second League, which was the 6th tier of the newly formed league system of the Socialist Yugoslavia, the club finished 4th. It was coached by Jovan Veselinović and the squad was formed mostly by experienced older players. In 1950–51 with an already renovated squad, it finishes third and qualified to the Belgrade First League where it also finished third achieving promotion to the 1953–54 Belgrade Podsavezna League, the national fourth tier, where they finished third, again. Led by the coach Žikica Spasojević and striker Petar Popović they achieved the promotion to the 1954–55 Serbian League, the third tier.

In summer 1955, Vule Radosavljević was made the main coach, however the club ended the first half of the season at bottom. Radosavljević was replaced by Dragomir Kojadinović and there were also changes at club direction board which may have contributed to a comeback with the team finishing the season in 8th place. This earned them participation in the pley-off for the Yugoslav Second League, however they failed to qualify. In 1955–56, many players left the club, and led by coach Brana Aćimović they finished 2nd in the Belgrade Podsavezna League. 1956 is the year of the beginning of the fall as many important club players retired in that period.

Also, numerous club directions and coaches succeeded. So, the club played constantly in Belgrade leagues. Great achievement was brought on to the club ten years later in the 1966–67 season when they finished first in the Second Belgrade League and won the Belgrade Cup the same year. They were promoted to the Serbian League where they were constantly on top. So, these seasons, the club competed for promotion to the Yugoslav Second league, which he reached as a champion of the 1971–72 season. There, Čukarički held for several years, but did not succeed to promotion to the Yugoslav First League.

In the early 1990s, the club played again in the third tier and between 1993 and 1995 in the second league of the Federal Republic of Yugoslavia. In the 1994–95 season, the club managed finally for the first time in its history the promotion to the first league, where they played until 1998. In the Yugoslav Cup in 1995, Čukarički came into the quarterfinals and also competed in the UEFA Intertoto Cup in 1996 and 1997. Their biggest success during this period came in the 1999–00 season, when they finished 6th in the first league, in which 21 teams participated. The club remained till 2003 in the first division.

=== From insolvency to privatization (2003–present) ===
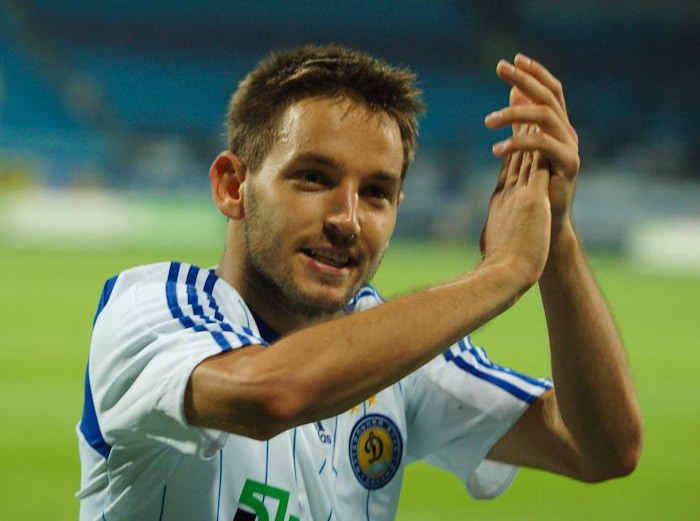
Miloš Ninković came from the youth school of the club and played three years as professional for Čukarički.

After four years in the first league, Čukarički was relegated in 2003. Although they succeeded in 2004 as champion of the group West in ensuring the direct re-promotion, the club was relegated again in 2005. Čukarički was renamed in the early 2000s, as the Serbian company Stankom dedicated itself as the main sponsor and funder. Therefore, the club was known for a long time under the name Čukarički Stankom. By the arrival of Stankom the club was stabilized. So, they improved the organization, increased the stadium capacity to 7,000 and also brought a better financial situation. In 2007, Čukarički finally reached the top division, the Serbian SuperLiga.

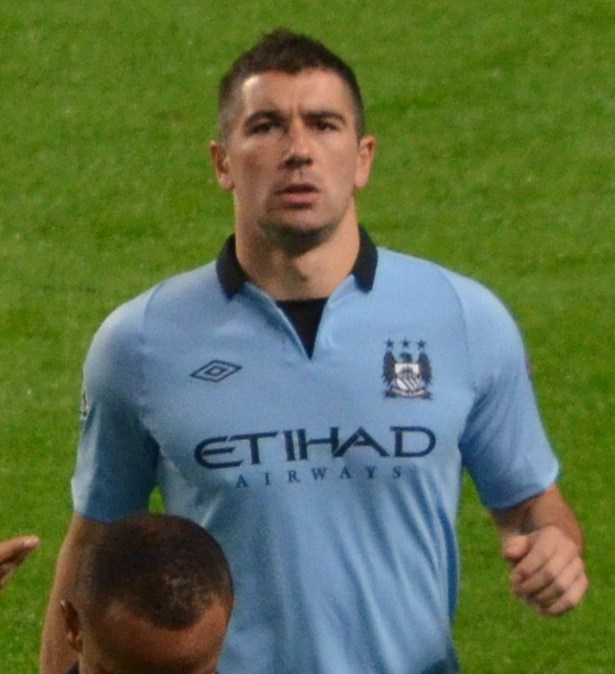
Aleksandar Kolarov played for Čukarički from 2003 to 2006 and is regarded as the club's most famous player.

From August 2007 to December 2008, the former Bundesliga manager Dragoslav Stepanović coached the club. After seven defeats in a row and the time between last place in the 2008–09 season, he was relieved of his duties. At the end of the season, the team made the 9th place in the table under coach Dejan Đurđević and remained in the league.

The 2009–10 season ended for Čukarički with the 13th place and they barely escaped relegation, three points ahead of Napredak Kruševac. This luck the team could not maintain in the 2010–11 season. The club could not win a single one of its thirty league matches and finished with just five points on the last place and was relegated to the Serbian First League.

Also in the Second League, Čukarički was not very successful. With 41 points they were equal on points with Banat Zrenjanin and Radnički Sombor. Because of the direct comparison between all three teams only Radnički Sombor had to join the 3rd league as 15th of the final table. The club was in a very difficult financial situation and was on the verge of bankruptcy, however, the year 2011 marked a turning point, as the construction and wholesale company ADOC, which operates in the pharmacy, diagnostics and construction industry, bought up Čukarički and immediately invested in the club, making Čukarički the first professional football club in Serbia which was privatized, and also one of the few clubs in Southeast Europe which are privately owned.

Through the privatization, the financial and organizational situation of the club improved significantly, but also in the infrastructure and the squad investments were made. In the 2012–13 season, the club then managed to finish as runner-up of the second league and returned to the first league. In the following 2013–14 season, the upswing of the club continued, so Čukarički was able to secure a surprising 5th place in the league.

== European record ==
Season	Competition	Round	Club	Home	Away	Aggregate
1996–97	UEFA Intertoto Cup	Group 9	(Slovakia) Spartak Trnava	—N/a	0–3	5th
1996–97	UEFA Intertoto Cup	Group 9	(Latvia) Daugava	1–3	—N/a	5th
1996–97	UEFA Intertoto Cup	Group 9	(Germany) Karlsruher SC	—N/a	0–3	5th
1996–97	UEFA Intertoto Cup	Group 9	(Romania) Universitatea Craiova	1–2	—N/a	5th
1997–98	UEFA Intertoto Cup	Group 10	(Netherlands) Groningen	—N/a	0–1	3rd
1997–98	UEFA Intertoto Cup	Group 10	(Romania) Gloria Bistrița	3–2	—N/a	3rd
1997–98	UEFA Intertoto Cup	Group 10	(France) Montpellier	—N/a	1–3	3rd
1997–98	UEFA Intertoto Cup	Group 10	(Bulgaria) Spartak Varna	3–0	—N/a	3rd
2014–15	UEFA Europa League	1QR	(Andorra) Sant Julià	4–0	0–0	4–0
2014–15	UEFA Europa League	2QR	(Austria) Grödig	0–4	2–1	2–5
2015–16	UEFA Europa League	1QR	(Slovenia) Domžale	0–0	1–0	1–0
2015–16	UEFA Europa League	2QR	(Azerbaijan) Gabala	1–0	0–2	1–2
2016–17	UEFA Europa League	1QR	(Kazakhstan) Ordabasy	3–0	3–3	6–3
2016–17	UEFA Europa League	2QR	(Hungary) Videoton	1–1	0–2	1–3
2019–20	UEFA Europa League	1QR	(Armenia) Banants	3–0	5–0	8–0
2019–20	UEFA Europa League	2QR	(Norway) Molde	1–3	0–0	1–3
2021–22	UEFA Europa Conference League	2QR	(Azerbaijan) Sumgayit	0–0	2–0	2–0
2021–22	UEFA Europa Conference League	3QR	(Sweden) Hammarby IF	3–1	1–5	4–6
2022–23	UEFA Europa Conference League	2QR	(Luxembourg) Racing Union	4–0	4–1	8–1
2022–23	UEFA Europa Conference League	3QR	(Netherlands) Twente	1–3	1–4	2–7
2023–24	UEFA Europa League	PO	(Greece) Olympiacos	0–3	1–3	1–6
2023–24	UEFA Europa Conference League	Group F	(Hungary) Ferencváros	1–2	1–3	4th out of 4
2023–24	UEFA Europa Conference League	Group F	(Italy) Fiorentina	0–1	0–6	4th out of 4
2023–24	UEFA Europa Conference League	Group F	(Belgium) Genk	0–2	0–2	4th out of 4

== Stadium ==
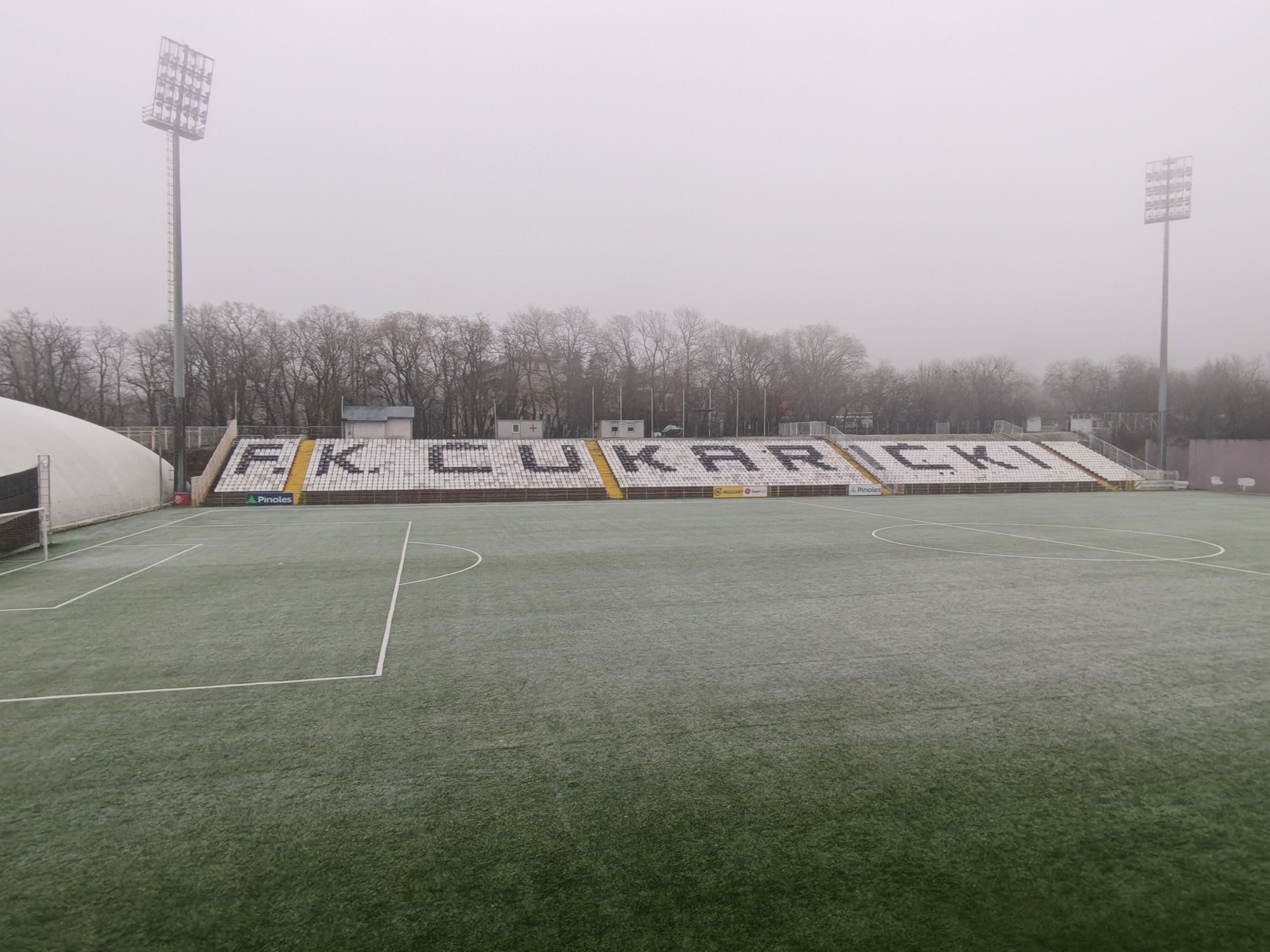
View on east stand of Čukarički Stadium during winter, February 2026

Čukarički Stadium, also known as Stadion na Banovom brdu, was inaugurated in 1969 and has an all-seated capacity of 4,070.

== Supporters ==
The supporters are known as Brđani Revolt, the official fan club was formed in 1991, the group was unofficially disbanded in 2005 after the death of 2 fans, but the group is still active to this day but in smaller numbers. The name is attributed to people from Belgrade residential area known as Banovo Brdo where the club offices and the stadium are located.

== Honours ==
- Serbian SuperLiga
  - Third place (5): 2014–15, 2015–16, 2020–21, 2021–22, 2022–23
- Serbian Cup
  - Winners: (1) 2014–15
  - Runners-up: (1) 2022–23

=== Top ten most appearances of all time ===
Rank.	Player	Period	Apps
1	(Serbia) Marko Docić	2016–	201
2	(Montenegro) Asmir Kajević	2016–22	173
3	(Serbia) Dragoljub Srnić	2012–17	169
4	(Serbia) Igor Matić	2012–17	153
5	(Serbia) Petar Bojić	2014–19	149
6	(Serbia) Miladin Stevanović	2018–	143
7	(Bosnia and Herzegovina) Stefan Kovač	2019–	142
8	(Serbia) Stefan Šapić	2016–22	137
9	(Montenegro) Filip Stojković	2013–16	119
10	(Serbia) Nemanja Stevanović	2012–16; 2018–19	117

== Current squad ==
=== First team ===
As of 9 October 2026

Note: Flags indicate national team as defined under FIFA eligibility rules; some limited exceptions apply. Players may hold more than one non-FIFA nationality.

No.	Pos.	Nation	Player
1	GK	SRB	Đorđe Nikolić
3	DF	SRB	Zlatan Šehović (on loan from Dukla Prague)
4	DF	SRB	Nenad Tomović
5	MF	SRB	Marko Docić (captain)
6	DF	SRB	Veljko Žurić
7	MF	MNE	Lazar Mijović
8	FW	SRB	Lazar Marković
9	FW	SRB	Luka Đorđević
10	MF	SRB	Uroš Miladinović
14	MF	MLI	Sambou Sissoko
16	DF	SRB	Strahinja Anđelić
17	DF	SRB	Jovan Vojnović
18	FW	EST	Karel Mustmaa (on loan from PAOK B)
19	DF	CIV	Assane Ouedraogo
20	MF	SEN	Aboubacar Cissé
22	DF	ARG	Ramiro Di Luciano (on loan from CSKA Moscow)
23	DF	CIV	Ismael Maiga
24	DF	SRB	Nikola Stanković

No.	Pos.	Nation	Player
25	FW	GRE	Fiorin Durmishaj
26	DF	SRB	Milan Đoković
27	FW	GBS	Aires Nanque
28	FW	SRB	Nemanja Radonjić
33	MF	SRB	Ognjen Abramušić
42	DF	GHA	Emmanuel Dzigbah
50	FW	SRB	Milan Pavkov
51	FW	ENG	Remy Rees-Dottin
72	MF	SRB	Uroš Nikolić
73	DF	SRB	Nemanja Miletić
77	MF	MNE	Andrej Bajović
81	GK	SRB	Vladan Čarapić
86	MF	SRB	Veljko Radosavljević
87	MF	SRB	Mateja Prokopijević
88	GK	SRB	Vladimir Stojković
91	FW	SRB	Mateo Maravić
99	FW	SRB	Đorđe Jovanović

=== Players with multiple nationalities ===
- (Serbia) (Croatia) Jovan Vojnović
- (Germany) (Nigeria) Coby Ebere
- (Ivory Coast) (Burkina Faso) Assane Ouedraogo
- (Greece) (Albania) Fiorin Durmishaj

=== Other players on contract ===
Note: Flags indicate national team as defined under FIFA eligibility rules; some limited exceptions apply. Players may hold more than one non-FIFA nationality.

No.	Pos.	Nation	Player
—	FW	GBS	Zé Mário

=== Out on loan ===
Note: Flags indicate national team as defined under FIFA eligibility rules; some limited exceptions apply. Players may hold more than one non-FIFA nationality.

No.	Pos.	Nation	Player
—	GK	SRB	Lazar Kaličanin (at Crown Legacy until 31 December 2026)
—	DF	SRB	Mijat Ivanović (at BASK until 30 June 2027)
—	MF	SRB	Andrija Miladinović (at Budućnost Dobanovci until 30 June 2027)

== Expert staff ==
Updated 26 June 2025

Current staff
- Head coach: vacant
- Assistant coach: vacant
- Assistant coach: vacant
- Coach: (Serbia) Marko Blažić
- Coach: (Serbia) Milan Smiljanić
- Analyst: (North Macedonia) Hristijan Hristov
- Goalkeeper coach: (Serbia) Oliver Kovačević
- Fitness coach: (Serbia) Draško Obradović
- Physiotherapist: (Serbia) Branislav Đukić
- Physiotherapist: (Serbia) Marko Popović
- Physiotherapist: (Serbia) Dejan Bogdanović
- Doctor: (Serbia) Predrag Stefanović
- Economic: (Serbia) Nenad Pavlović
- Economic: (Serbia) Nataša Davidović
- Team manager: (Serbia) Dragan Mance

== Club management ==
Updated 26 June 2025

Current staff
- President and owner: (Serbia) Dragan Obradović
- Sporting director: (Serbia) Vladimir Matijašević
- Technical director: (Serbia) Goran Grkinić
- General manager: (Serbia) Dijana Petrović Đorđević

== Notable players ==
This is a list of FK Čukarički players with senior national team appearances:

Serbia and its predecessors

- Miroslav Bogosavac
- Veljko Birmančević
- Mihajlo Cvetković
- Milko Djurovski
- Milan Dudić
- Goran Gavrančić
- Franjo Giler
- Jovan Gojković
- Đorđe Ivanović
- Bojan Isailović
- Aleksandar Jevtić
- Đorđe Jovanović
- Aleksandar Jović
- Aleksandar Kolarov
- Blagoje Marjanović
- Srđan Mijailović
- Albert Nađ
- Pavle Ninkov
- Miloš Ninković
- Ajazdin Nuhi
- Andrija Pavlović
- Aleksandar Petrović
- Đorđe Petrović
- Nikola Trajković
- Milan Vilotić
- Milivoje Vitakić

Other

- (Benin) Mattéo Ahlinvi
- (Bosnia and Herzegovina) Admir Aganović
- (Bosnia and Herzegovina) Ognjen Vranješ
- (Bosnia and Herzegovina) Srđan Pecelj
- (Bosnia and Herzegovina) Nemanja Supić
- (Ghana) Lee Addy
- (Ghana) Samuel Owusu
- (North Macedonia) Mario Gjurovski
- (North Macedonia) Perica Stančeski
- (North Macedonia) Ostoja Stjepanović
- (Malta) Paul Mbong
- (Montenegro) Darko Bulatović
- (Montenegro) Đorđije Ćetković
- (Montenegro) Nikola Drinčić
- (Montenegro) Branislav Janković
- (Montenegro) Asmir Kajević
- (Montenegro) Ivan Kecojević
- (Montenegro) Boris Kopitović
- (Montenegro) Dušan Lagator
- (Montenegro) Risto Lakić
- (Montenegro) Staniša Mandić
- (Montenegro) Mitar Novaković
- (Montenegro) Marko Rakonjac
- (Montenegro) Filip Stojković
- (Montenegro) Darko Zorić
- (Namibia) Rudolf Bester
- (Namibia) Eliphas Shivute
- (Nigeria) Sunday Adetunji
- (Nigeria) Ugo Ukah
- (Sierra Leone) Kelfala Marah
- (South Africa) Luther Singh
- (Uganda) Eugene Sseppuya
- For the list of current and former FK Čukarički players with Wikipedia article, see Category:FK Čukarički players.

== Notable managers ==
Name	Period		Played	Won	Drawn	Lost	Win%	Honours
Name	From	To	Played	Won	Drawn	Lost	Win%	Honours
(Serbia) Vladan Milojević	February 2012	October 2015						2014–15 Serbian Cup winners
(Bosnia and Herzegovina) Dušan Kerkez	May 2022	August 2023						2022–23 Serbian Cup runners-up

== Kit manufacturers and shirt sponsors ==
Period	Kit manufacturer	Shirt sponsor
2007–2010	Nike	
2010–2014	Kappa	
2014–	Adidas	Oliva
