= Amway Stadium =

Future MLS Next Pro stadium

- Interactive map of Amway Stadium
- Former names: GR Soccer Stadium (planning)
- Location: 230 Winter Ave. NW; Grand Rapids, Michigan, US
- Coordinates: 42°58′5.7576″N 85°40′50.4732″W
- Owner: Grand Rapids-Kent County Convention/Arena Authority
- Capacity: 8,500
- Acreage: 8.2 acres (3.3 ha)

Construction
- Groundbreaking: May 28, 2025
- Opened: Spring 2027 (planned)
- Cost: $175 million
- Architect: Progressive Companies
- General contractors: AECOM Hunt; Rockford Construction

Tenant
- AC Grand Rapids (MLSNP) (2027–)

Amway Stadium is a soccer-specific stadium under construction located in Grand Rapids, Michigan. Construction on the stadium began in May 2025 and is set to open in 2027. It is the future home of AC Grand Rapids which will begin its first season in MLS Next Pro in 2027.

== History ==
On November 24, 2020, Grand Action 2.0, a non profit economic development organization, announced their plans for several major projects in the city of Grand Rapids including an amphitheater and a soccer-specific stadium which was initially listed to be able to accommodate 5,000-plus people. The plans were part of a feasibility study conducted by Convention, Sports and Leisure International in 2016 but were shelved in 2017. The initial tenants of this feasibility study were the now-defunct Grand Rapids FC soccer team of USL League 2.

On September 1, 2022, MiBiz reported that they had obtained renderings of a proposed stadium on the west side of Grand Rapids just north of the YMCA of Greater Grand Rapids on Pearl Street and west of US-131 and the Gerald Ford Presidential Library. It was also reported that DP Fox Ventures LLC, an investment firm owned by Dan DeVos and Pamella DeVos had acquired several plots of land on the site which contained city-owned surface parking and a Big Boy restaurant. On December 19, 2023, the Big Boy restaurant located on the site had abruptly closed its doors. A spokesperson for the DeVos family had commented about the closure "Dan and Pamella DeVos acquired this land because they believed it held tremendous potential for a future community use benefitting West Michigan residents, employees and visitors. The current tenant vacating the site provides the opportunity for advancing exploration of future uses in the weeks and months ahead".

On December 23, 2023, renderings of the stadium were revealed at a Grand Rapids Committee meeting. The stadium's capacity was increased to 8,500. Grand Rapids Deputy City Manager Kate Berens had also revealed that Grand Action 2.0 is working in tandem with the city of Grand Rapids as well as Kent County and the Grand Rapids-Kent County Convention/Arena Authority to build the stadium along with the Acrisure Amphitheater. The stadium is also projected to be able to draw 164,350 visitors per season and would also host 17 professional soccer matches along with 56 other events including other sports events and concerts annually.

On November 18, 2024, it was announced that the Ada, Michigan-based multi-level marketing company Amway had secured the naming rights for the stadium after providing a $33 million donation to finance the construction of the stadium. The city of Grand Rapids also approved to issue $100.5 million in bonds that would be sourced from Kent County lodging tax revenue on hotel and motel stays which would be used to finance the construction of the stadium.

On December 17, 2024, it was announced that the DeVos family had established a new soccer team to occupy Amway Stadium. The team will initially be known as the West Michigan Soccer team and is set to play in the spring of 2027. It was also confirmed that the team would play in the MLS Next Pro league, making it the second professional soccer team in the state of Michigan, alongside Detroit City FC, though the two teams will not see regular play against each other.
