= William Ritchie =

William, Willie, Bill, or Billy Ritchie may refer to:

== Law and politics ==
- Sir William Johnstone Ritchie (1813–1892), Chief Justice of Canada
- William Ritchie (barrister) (1817–1862), English Advocate-General of Bengal
- William Gordon Ritchie (1918–1998), Canadian politician
- Bill Ritchie (politician) (1927–2014), Canadian politician

== Sports ==
- William Ritchie (rugby union) (1882–1940), Scottish international rugby union player
- Willie Ritchie (golfer) (1884–1966), Scottish golfer
- Willie Ritchie (1891–1975), American boxer
- William E. Ritchie (1871-1943), American trick bicyclist
- William Ritchie (footballer) (1895–1965), Scottish footballer
- Billy Ritchie (footballer, born 1932) (William Saunders Ritchie, 1832-2015), Scottish footballer, see List of Bury F.C. players (1–24 appearances)
- Billy Ritchie (1936–2016), Scottish footballer

== Others ==
- William Ritchie (moderator) (1758–1830), Moderator of the General Assembly of the Church of Scotland
- William Ritchie (editor) (1781–1831), Scottish journalist
- William Ritchie (physicist) (1790–1837), Scottish physicist
- William Thomas Ritchie (1873–1945), Scottish cardiologist
- Bill Ritchie (1931–2010), Scottish cartoonist
- Billy Ritchie (musician) (born 1944), British keyboard player and composer
