= Whitecaps FC 2 =

Soccer club in Vancouver, British Columbia

- Nickname: WFC2
- Founded: November 21, 2014; 11 years ago December 6, 2021; 4 years ago (refounded)
- Stadium: Swangard Stadium; Burnaby, British Columbia
- Capacity: 5,288
- Owner: Vancouver Whitecaps FC
- Head coach: Rich Fagan
- League: MLS Next Pro
- 2024: 7th, Western Conference; Playoffs: Did not qualify
- Website: www.whitecapsfc.com/wfc2/
Home colours	Away colours

Whitecaps FC 2 is a professional soccer team based in Vancouver, British Columbia, Canada that serves as the reserve team of the Vancouver Whitecaps FC of Major League Soccer.

== History ==
Prior to the MLS Next Pro iteration the team played its home games at UBC's Thunderbird Stadium and competed in the United Soccer League.

On November 17, 2017, the Whitecaps announced they were disbanding WFC2 and entering an affiliation agreement with USL expansion team Fresno FC.

On December 6, 2021, the Vancouver Whitecaps FC were named as one of 21 clubs that would field a team in the new MLS Next Pro league beginning in the 2022 season. The team moved to Swangard Stadium and would continue to play under the Whitecaps FC 2 name, with a rebrand scheduled for 2023. They retained the name and logo for the 2023 season. As of 2026, the rebrand has not been revealed.

== Players and staff ==
=== Roster ===
As of September 18, 2026

No.	Pos.	Nation	Player
43	DF	USA	Trevor Wright
45	FW	COL	Yeider Zuluaga
46	MF	USA	Cristiano Bruletti
47	FW	SRB	Marko Popović
48	DF	SKN	Micaah Garnette
49	MF	CAN	Valter Sedin
53	DF	CAN	Immanuel Mathe
54	DF	USA	Prince Amponsah
60	GK	CAN	Sam Rogers
62	MF	CAN	Ryder Sewell
63	FW	CAN	Johnny Selemani
66	DF	CAN	Sahil Deo
67	MF	CAN	Yuma Tsuji

Signed to first team contract with the Vancouver Whitecaps FC.
Vancouver Whitecaps FC academy player.

=== Head coaches ===
- Includes regular season and playoffs

Coach	Nationality	Start	End	Games	Win	Loss	Draw	Win %
Alan Koch	South Africa	January 30, 2015	December 14, 2016	61	22	24	15	36.07
Rich Fagan	Scotland	February 20, 2017	November 17, 2017	32	5	18	9	15.63
Nick Dasovic	Canada	March 26, 2022	February 9, 2023	24	7	9	8	29.17
Ricardo Clark	United States	February 9, 2023	January 12, 2026	0	0	0	0	—

=== Club captains ===
Years	Name	Nation
2015	Tyler Rosenlund	Canada
2016	Kyle Greig	United States
2022	Simon Becher; Issac Boehmer	United States; Canada
2023	Giovanni Aguilar	United States

=== Notable former players ===
Players who made at least 1 senior international appearance before or after joining Whitecaps FC 2.

- (Canada) Sam Adekugbe
- (Canada) Ali Ahmed
- (Canada) Theo Bair
- (Canada) Marco Bustos
- (Canada) Lucas Cavallini
- (Canada) Caleb Clarke
- (Canada) Alphonso Davies
- (Canada) David Edgar
- (Canada) Jackson Farmer
- (Canada) Kianz Froese
- (Canada) Daniel Haber
- (Canada) Ben McKendry
- (Canada) Sean Melvin
- (Canada) Ralph Priso
- (Canada) Dominick Zator
- (Ecuador) Pedro Vite
- (The Gambia) Pa-Modou Kah
- (Honduras) Deybi Flores
- (Jamaica) Andre Lewis
- (Moldova) Mihail Gherasimencov
- (New Zealand) Myer Bevan
- (New Zealand) Francis de Vries
- (New Zealand) Deklan Wynne
- (Philippines) Matthew Baldisimo
- (Philippines) Michael Baldisimo
- (Serbia) Ranko Veselinović
- (Syria) Belal Halbouni
- (Tanzania) Cyprian Kachwele
- (Tunisia) Rayan Elloumi
- (United States) Sebastian Berhalter
- (United States) Tim Parker
- (Wales) Robert Earnshaw

== Year-by-year ==
As of December 31, 2024

Year	Division	League	Record (W–D–L)	Position	Playoffs	Avg. attendance
2015	3	United Soccer League	8–6–14	11th (Western)	Did not qualify	1,682
2016	3	United Soccer League	12–9–9	6th (Western)	Conference Finals	1,779
2017	2	United Soccer League	5–9–18	14th (Western)	Did not qualify	869
2018–2021	WFC2 disbanded					
2022	3	MLS Next Pro	7–8 (Note: 2022: 3 shootout wins, 5 shootout losses.)–9	7th (Western)	Did not qualify	N/A
2023	3	MLS Next Pro	8–7 (Note: 2023: 3 shootout wins, 4 shootout losses.)–13	11th (Western)	Did not qualify	N/A
2024	3	MLS Next Pro	10–7 (Note: 2024: 3 shootout wins, 4 shootout losses.)–11	7th (Western)	Western Conference Quarterfinals	N/A
2025	3	MLS Next Pro	11-5-12	7th (Western)	Western Conference Quarterfinals	N/A
2026	3	MLS Next Pro	6-5-17	12th (Western)	Did not qualify	N/A
