= John Chukwu =

Nigerian actor (1947–1990)

- Born: 1947; Edo State
- Died: 1990 (aged 42–43)
- Occupations: Actor; comedian; MC
- Father: Emmanuel Chukwu Ochei

John Chukwu (1947 – 1990) was a Nigerian comedian, actor and MC, who is recognized as a pioneer of stand-up comedy in Nigeria and known for his versatility in the entertainment industry. In the 1970s, he starred in Ola Balogun's Amadi and the Jab Adu-directed film Bisi, Daughter of the River and was a compere on NTA Channel 10's The Bar Beach Show. In the 1980s, he dabbled into stand-up comedy and hosting events.

== Biography ==
Chukwu is from Mmaku in Awgu LGA of Enugu State but was born in present Edo State to the family of Emmanuel Chukwu Ochei, a guard in the forestry department. Chukwu who is of Igbo heritage spent his adult life in Lagos. Before a career in show business, Chukwu worked as a staff of King's College Library. After moving into the entertainment industry, he was a presenter on the radio show Join the Bandwagon on FRCN, Ikoyi.

Between 1975 and 1978, he starred in Amadi as the titular character of the Ola Balogun-directed movie, and in 1977, Chukwu was a cast member of Bisi, Daughter of the River, along with Patti Boulaye.

Chukwu also dabbled as a deejay working at Club Chicago and Hots Spot. In the 1980s, he established in own club, Klass NIte Club, where he performed his style of comedy to an audience, he managed the facility until his death in 1990.
