= Van Parker =

Canadian soccer player

Personal information
- Full name: Van Ethan Paul Parker
- Date of birth: January 29, 2009 (age 17)
- Place of birth: Las Vegas, United States
- Height: 1.83 m (6 ft 0 in)
- Position: Winger

Team information
- Current team: Real Salt Lake
- Number: 33

Youth career
- Las Vegas Lions
- 2022–2026: Real Salt Lake

Senior career*
Years	Team	Apps	(Gls)
2026–	Real Salt Lake	0	(0)
2026–	Real Monarchs	12	(4)

International career
2025–	Canada U17	8	(4)
- * Club domestic league appearances and goals as of 19:38, 6 October 2026 (UTC)

Van Ethan Paul Parker (born 29 January 2009) is a professional soccer player who plays as a winger for Real Salt Lake in Major League Soccer. Born in the United States, he is a youth international for Canada.

== Career ==
Parker began playing football with the academy of the Las Vegas Lions at the age of 2. A product of Real Salt Lake, he helped the Real Salt Lake U16s win back to back titles in the MLS Next and was named Most Valuable Player and won the Golden Boot in 2025. On 2 February 2026, he signed a Homegrown contract with Real Salt Lake until 2030, with an option until 2031. He was selected among The Guardian's 60 best young talents in world football selection for 2026.

== International career ==
Parker was born in the United States to an American father and Canadian mother. He was called up to the Canada U17s for the 2025 FIFA U-17 World Cup.
