= Darius Randell =

American soccer player (born 2007)

Personal information
- Date of birth: August 25, 2007 (age 19)
- Place of birth: Monrovia, Liberia
- Height: 1.83 m (6 ft 0 in)
- Positions: Winger; forward

Team information
- Current team: Minnesota United
- Number: 98

Youth career
- –2022: Boreal FC
- 2022–2024: Minnesota United

Senior career*
Years	Team	Apps	(Gls)
2023–	Minnesota United 2	75	(19)
2025–	Minnesota United	4	(0)

International career^{‡}
2026–	United States U20	1	(0)
- * Club domestic league appearances and goals as of 20 September 2026 ‡ National team caps and goals as of 1 October 2026

Darius Randell (born 25 August 2007) is a professional soccer player who plays as a winger or forward for Minnesota United. Born in Liberia, he is a United States youth international.

== Early life ==
Randell was born on 25 August 2007 in Monrovia, Liberia. At the age of eleven, he moved to Brooklyn Park, Minnesota, United States.

== Club career ==
As a youth player, Randell joined the youth academy of American side Boreal FC. Following his stint here, he joined the youth academy of American outfit Minnesota United at the age of fourteen where he played as a defender for the club's under-15 team.

In 2023, he was promoted to their reserve team. On 7 May 2025, he debuted and scored his first goal for the Loons senior team during a 1–0 away win over Louisville City FC in the U.S. Open Cup.

== International career ==
Randell is a United States youth international and has represented the country at under-19 level and is eligible to represent Liberia internationally, having been born in the country.

On 1 October 2026, he debuted for the United States men's national under-19 soccer team during a 0–2 away friendly loss to the Brazil national under-19 football team.

== Style of play ==
Randell plays as a winger or forward and is right-footed. American news website U.S. Soccer Collective wrote in 2026 that he "is a dynamic, direct and aggressive winger who shows good persistence and playmaking when attacking".
