= Matthew Jones (footballer, born 1980) =

English footballer

Personal information
- Full name: Matthew Neil Jones
- Date of birth: 11 October 1980 (age 46)
- Place of birth: Shrewsbury, England
- Position: Midfielder

Senior career*
Years	Team	Apps	(Gls)
1998–2001	Shrewsbury Town	7	(0)
2000–2001	→ Southport (loan)	2	(1)
- * Club domestic league appearances and goals

Matthew Neil Jones (born 11 October 1980 in Shrewsbury, England), is a footballer who played as a midfielder for Shrewsbury Town in The Football League.

He made his debut for the Shrews on 8 May 1999 in the Third Division 3–0 away win against Torquay United at Plainmoor. He came on as a second-half substitute for Austin Berkley.
