= Mohamed Touré =

Mohamed Touré may refer to:

- Mohamed Touré (footballer, born 1997), Ivorian football winger for Trofense
- Mohamed Touré (footballer, born 2004), Australian football forward for Norwich City
- Mohamed Touré (footballer, born 2005), Guinean football forward for Viktoria Plzeň
- Mohamed Toure (American football), American college football linebacker for the Miami Hurricanes

== See also ==
- Askia Muhammad I, 15th-century ruler of Mali also known as Muhammad Ture
