= AC Grand Rapids =

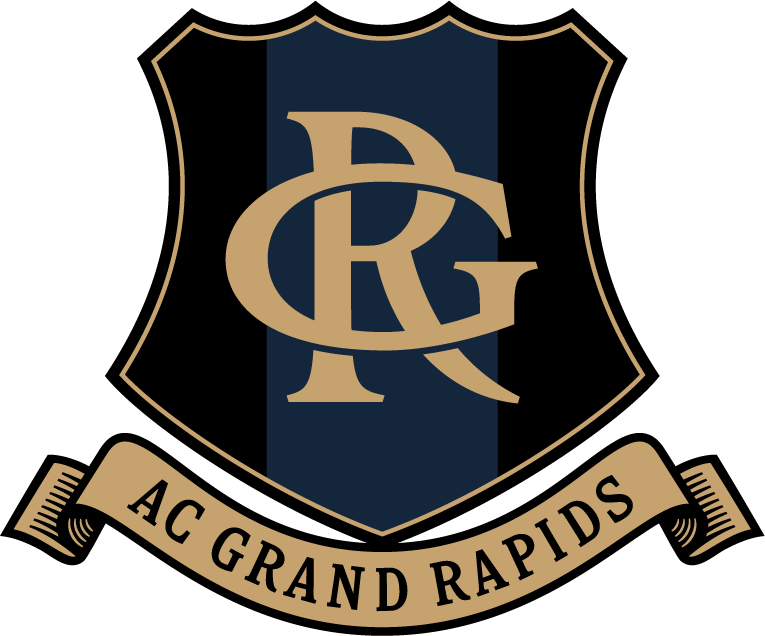
- Full name: Athletic Club Grand Rapids
- Founded: December 17, 2024; 22 months ago
- Stadium: Amway Stadium; Grand Rapids, Michigan
- Capacity: 8,500
- Owners: David Van Andel; Dan DeVos
- President: Darrius Barnes
- Head coach: Erik Bushey
- League: MLS Next Pro

Athletic Club Grand Rapids, referred to as AC Grand Rapids, is an American professional soccer team based in Grand Rapids, Michigan. Founded in 2024, the team plans to make its MLS Next Pro debut in 2027.

== History ==
On December 17, 2024, MLS Next Pro awarded an expansion team to an ownership group based in the city of Grand Rapids, Michigan. The team is owned by David Van Andel and Dan DeVos. They are planned to begin play in 2027 at Amway Stadium, a soccer-specific venue that began construction in 2024 and will have 8,500 seats.

== See also ==
- MLS Next Pro
