= Crown Legacy FC =

- Full name: Crown Legacy FC
- Founded: August 4, 2022; 4 years ago
- Stadium: Mecklenburg County Sportsplex; Matthews, North Carolina
- Capacity: 5,000
- Owner: Charlotte FC
- President: Darrius Barnes
- Manager: Kevin Sawchak
- League: MLS Next Pro
- 2025: 13th, Eastern Conference; Playoffs: DNQ
- Website: www.crownlegacyfc.com
Home colors	Away colors

Crown Legacy FC is an American soccer team that is located in Matthews, North Carolina. It is the reserve team of Charlotte FC and participates in MLS Next Pro.

== History ==
On March 31, 2022, Charlotte FC announced it would field an MLS Next Pro team under the leadership of president Darrius Barnes. The club had previously affiliated with the Charlotte Independence of USL League One for the 2022 season. The team was one of seven MLS-affiliated clubs that would join MLS Next Pro in 2023.

The club's name, Crown Legacy FC, and circular logo were announced in January 2023 following a delay due to the death of Charlotte FC defender Anton Walkes. The inaugural season began on March 26.

== Stadium ==
Crown Legacy FC will play their home matches at the Mecklenburg County Sportsplex in Matthews, North Carolina. The complex's main stadium has a capacity of 5,000 spectators. Charlotte FC has trained at the facility since 2022.

== Players and staff ==
=== Current roster ===
No.	Pos.	Nation	Player
31	GK	USA	Jahiem Wickham
32	FW	USA	Barzee Blama
34	DF	USA	Andrew Johnson
43	DF	ECU	Willian Sangoquiza
45	DF	ENG	Jamie Smith
48	MF	USA	Aron John
50	GK	SRB	Lazar Kaličanin (on loan from Čukarički)
53	GK	USA	J. P. Philpot
54	DF	CIV	Assane Ouedraogo
56	MF	USA	Erik Pena
58	MF	USA	Daniel Longo
60	MF	SRB	Andrej Subotić
64	DF	GHA	Morrison Agyemang
70	MF	UGA	Emmanuel Uchegbu
71	FW	USA	Nathan Richmond
74	MF	ECU	Michael Ayoví
77	MF	ENG	Ty Barnett
83	FW	CAN	Hugo Mbongue
90	DF	USA	Ashton Kamdem

Signed to first team contract with Charlotte FC.
Charlotte FC Academy Player.

=== Staff ===
Coaching staff
Head coach	Kevin Sawchak
Assistant coach	Kevin Martínez
Goalkeeper coach	Brian Edwards
