= Rich Fagan =

Scottish football coach

Personal information
- Place of birth: Glasgow, Scotland

Managerial career
- Years: Team
- 2006–2009: Surrey FC SYSA (youth)
- 2009–2010: Surrey FC SYSA
- 2010–2013: Whitecaps FC (staff)
- 2013–: Whitecaps FC (youth)
- 2017: Whitecaps FC 2

Rich Fagan is a Scottish football coach. He is the head coach of the Vancouver Whitecaps FC U-18 and −19 squads and was the coach of Vancouver Whitecaps FC 2 for the 2017 season, until it disbanded.

== Career ==
In March 2015, Fagan was appointed head coach of the Whitecaps U-18 squad, and went on to coach the team on a 34 win streak all the way to the finals. Fagan was appointed head coach of the Whitecap's USL side Whitecaps FC 2 a month before the start of the USL's 2017 season, because the club believed that the youth players were used to Fagan's coaching style, and it would help the transition between the youth and professional, with Whitecaps FC 2 being the link.
