= MLS Next Pro =

Professional soccer league in the United States and Canada

- Organizing body: Major League Soccer
- Founded: June 21, 2021; 5 years ago
- First season: 2022
- Country: United States
- Other club from: Canada
- Confederation: CONCACAF
- Conferences: 2
- Number of clubs: 30
- Level on pyramid: 3
- Domestic cup: U.S. Open Cup
- Current champion(s): Chattanooga FC (2026)
- Current regular season title: Austin FC II (2026)
- Broadcasters: OneFootball; YouTube
- Website: mlsnextpro.com
- Current: 2026 MLS Next Pro season

MLS Next Pro (MLSNP) is a men's professional soccer league in the United States and Canada that is affiliated with Major League Soccer (MLS). It launched in 2022 with 21 teams and now comprises 27 reserve sides of MLS clubs and three independent clubs (Carolina Core FC, Chattanooga FC and CT United). MLS Next Pro is classified as part of the third tier of the United States soccer league system.

As of the 2026 season, 27 of the 30 MLS teams held affiliations with an MLS Next Pro team, with only CF Montréal, D.C. United, and San Diego FC having no such franchise affiliation.

== History ==
In the mid 2000s, MLS teams began to form their own academies to begin the development of players. In 2005, MLS launched a reserve league with the then 12 teams that competed in MLS. This was an effort to allow games for the players amongst the academies for more meaningful competition.

MLS announced the dissolution of the Reserve League following the partnership formed with then-named USL. This allowed players to get loaned from teams in MLS to play minutes in teams in third division soccer. This was mandatory during the time of affiliation between MLS–USL clubs. During the partnership, teams in MLS began the foundings of their own B teams, or No. 2 teams. First teams among MLS to field B teams were: RSL, LA Galaxy, Toronto FC, and Portland Timbers.

=== Establishment ===
On June 21, 2021, Major League Soccer announced the creation of a new professional league which would begin play in 2022. MLS has applied to the United States Soccer Federation for the league to be sanctioned as a Division III professional league, the same level currently occupied by USL League One and the National Independent Soccer Association and one level below the USL Championship. MLS announced that Next Pro would start with at least 20 teams, many of them owned by Major League Soccer and development teams between their first-teams and their youth academies. All MLS clubs with reserve teams in the USL Championship or USL League One initially planned to move those sides to MLS Next Pro by 2023. D.C. United's formerly owned-and-operated reserve team was sold to independent buyers.

The inaugural match of MLS Next Pro was played on March 25, 2022, at Hermann Stadium in St. Louis. St. Louis City 2 defeated Rochester New York FC 2–0. Wan Kuzain scored the first ever goal in the 20th minute.

The league makes use of unique rules such as all regular season draws being decided by penalty shootouts and the addition of concussion substitutions. On July 6, 2022, new rules for the league were introduced in the middle of the season. This included an off-field treatment rule meant to curb gamesmanship and timewasting and a new rule for red card suspensions: the suspension a player gets for getting a red card or two yellow cards in the same game will be served by the player when next playing against the same opponent.

MLS Next Pro will transition to a fall-to-spring schedule in 2027.

== Competition format ==
The league runs from spring to fall with the season kicking off in March. Each team plays 28 regular-season games, followed by a 16-team playoff tournament. The league is divided into Eastern and Western Conferences.

Unlike Major League Soccer, MLS Next Pro does not feature a salary cap and player contracts are held by the teams, not the league. Team rosters can have up to 24 professional players (not including amateur academy players) with a maximum of seven international players. An MLS Next Pro club's active roster contains up to 35 players, all of whom are eligible for selection to each official match roster during the MLS Next Pro season.

== Teams ==
Locations of announced teams in MLS Next Pro:
- Eastern Conference - Northeast Division Eastern Conference - Southeast Division
- Western Conference - Frontier Division Western Conference - Pacific Division
- future teams

Team	Location	Stadium	Capacity	Founded	Joined	Head coach	Affiliate
Eastern Conference
Northeast Division
CT United FC	New Haven, Connecticut	Morrone Stadium (Storrs) Reese Stadium	5,300 3,000	2024	2026	Shavar Thomas	Independent
Columbus Crew 2	Columbus, Ohio	Historic Crew Stadium (Note: Soccer-specific stadium)	19,968	2021	2022	Vacant	Columbus Crew
FC Cincinnati 2	Highland Heights, Kentucky	NKU Soccer Stadium	1,000	2021	2022	Sammy Castellanos	FC Cincinnati
New England Revolution II	Foxborough, Massachusetts	Gillette Stadium (Note: Multi-purpose stadium)	20,000	2019	2022	Pablo Moreira	New England Revolution
New York City FC II	New York City, New York	Belson Stadium	2,168	2021	2022	Matt Pilkington	New York City FC
New York Red Bulls II	Montclair, New Jersey	MSU Soccer Park at Pittser Field	5,000	2015	2023	Dominik Wohlert	New York Red Bulls
Philadelphia Union II	Chester, Pennsylvania	Subaru Park	18,500	2015	2022	Ryan Richter	Philadelphia Union
Toronto FC II	Toronto, Ontario	York Lions Stadium	4,000	2014	2022	Gianni Cimini	Toronto FC
Southeast Division
Atlanta United 2	Kennesaw, Georgia	Fifth Third Stadium	8,318	2017	2023	José Silva	Atlanta United FC
Carolina Core FC	High Point, North Carolina	Truist Point (Note: Baseball park)	4,500	2022	2024	Donovan Ricketts	Independent
Chattanooga FC	Chattanooga, Tennessee	Finley Stadium	20,668	2009	2024	Richard Dixon	Independent
Chicago Fire FC II	Bridgeview, Illinois	SeatGeek Stadium	20,000	2021	2022	Mike Matkovich	Chicago Fire FC
Crown Legacy FC	Matthews, North Carolina	Sportsplex at Matthews	5,000	2022	2023	Kevin Sawchak	Charlotte FC
Huntsville City FC	Huntsville, Alabama	Joe W. Davis Stadium	6,000	2022	2023	Chris O'Neal	Nashville SC
Inter Miami CF II	Fort Lauderdale, Florida	Chase Stadium	21,550	2019	2022	Cristian Ledesma	Inter Miami CF
Orlando City B	Kissimmee, Florida	Osceola County Stadium	5,300	2015	2022	Edward Wilding	Orlando City SC
Western Conference
Frontier Division
Austin FC II	Austin, Texas	Parmer Field	1,000	2022	2023	Jason Shackell	Austin FC
Colorado Rapids 2	Denver, Colorado	Dick's Sporting Goods Park (Commerce City) University of Denver Soccer Stadium	18,061 2,000	2021	2022	Erik Bushey	Colorado Rapids
Houston Dynamo 2	Houston, Texas	SaberCats Stadium (Note: Rugby Union)	3,200	2021	2022	Jeremy Hurdle	Houston Dynamo FC
Sporting Kansas City II	Kansas City, Missouri	Swope Soccer Village	3,500	2015	2022	Lee Tschantret	Sporting Kansas City
Minnesota United FC 2	Saint Paul, Minnesota	Allianz Field National Sports Center (Blaine)	19,400 5,500	2021	2022	Fanendo Adi	Minnesota United FC
North Texas SC	Mansfield, Texas	Texas Health Mansfield Stadium	7,000	2018	2022	John Gall	FC Dallas
St. Louis City 2	St. Louis, Missouri	Energizer Park	22,423	2021	2022	David Critchley	St. Louis City SC
Pacific Division
Los Angeles FC 2	Fullerton, California	Titan Stadium	10,000	2023	2023	Fabian Sandoval	Los Angeles FC
Portland Timbers 2	Portland, Oregon	Providence Park	25,218	2014	2022	Jack Cassidy	Portland Timbers
Real Monarchs	Herriman, Utah	Zions Bank Stadium	5,000	2014	2022	Mark Lowry	Real Salt Lake
San Jose Earthquakes II	Moraga, California	Saint Mary's Stadium	5,500	2021	2022	Dan DeGeer	San Jose Earthquakes
Tacoma Defiance	Tukwila, Washington	Starfire Sports Stadium	4,500	2014	2022	Paulo Nagamura	Seattle Sounders FC
Ventura County FC	Thousand Oaks, California	William Rolland Stadium	2,000	2014	2023	Matt Taylor	LA Galaxy
Whitecaps FC 2	Burnaby, British Columbia	Swangard Stadium	5,228	2021	2022	Rich Fagan	Vancouver Whitecaps FC

=== Future teams ===
Team	Location	Stadium	Capacity	Founded	Joining	Affiliate
Jacksonville Armada FC	Jacksonville, Florida	New Eastside Stadium	8,000	2013	2027	Independent
Forest City Cleveland	Cleveland, Ohio	South Gateway Stadium	10,000	2022	2027	Independent
AC Grand Rapids	Grand Rapids, Michigan	Amway Stadium	8,500	2024	2027	Independent
The Island F.C.	Uniondale, New York	New Stadium at Mitchel Athletic Complex	2,500	2025	2027	Independent

=== Former teams ===
Club	City	Stadium	Capacity	Founded	Joined	Last season	Affiliate
Rochester New York FC	Brighton, New York	John L. DiMarco Field	1,500	1996	2022	2022	Independent

=== Timeline ===
League member Former member Future member Other leagues

== Champions ==
Season	Playoff champions	Regular season champions
2022	Columbus Crew 2	Columbus Crew 2
2023	Austin FC II	Colorado Rapids 2
2024	North Texas SC	North Texas SC
2025	New York Red Bulls II	St. Louis City 2
2026	Chattanooga FC	Austin FC II

=== Finals ===
Year	Winner	Score	Runner-up	Venue	MVP	Attendance	Ref.
2022	Columbus Crew 2	4–1	St. Louis City 2	Lower.com Field	Marco Micaletto (CC2)	7,446	
2023	Austin FC II	3–1	Columbus Crew 2	Lower.com Field	Valentin Noël (AU2)	7,500	
2024	North Texas SC	3–2	Philadelphia Union II	Toyota Stadium	Herbert Endeley (NTX)	7,692	
2025	New York Red Bulls II	3–3 (3–1 p)	Colorado Rapids 2	Sports Illustrated Stadium	Rafael Mosquera (NYR)	9,095	
2026	Chattanooga FC	1–0	Los Angeles FC 2	Finley Stadium	Damien Barker-John (CFC)	10,228	

== Individual game highest attendance ==
=== Regular season ===
	Home team	Score	Away team	Attendance	Stadium	Date	Ref
1	St. Louis City 2	3–1	Houston Dynamo 2	12,263	Energizer Park	May 4, 2025	
2	St. Louis City 2	5–0	Tacoma Defiance	12,022	CityPark	October 6, 2024	
3	St. Louis City 2	2–0	Sporting Kansas City II	10,671	CityPark	June 23, 2024	
4	St. Louis City 2	4–1	LA Galaxy II	9,626	CityPark	September 17, 2023	
5	St. Louis City 2	4–0	Real Monarchs	9,489	CityPark	August 6, 2023	
6	Chattanooga FC	1–0	Inter Miami CF II	6,107	Finley Stadium	July 4, 2026	
7	The Town FC	0–0 (4–2 p)	Austin FC II	5,500	PayPal Park	April 20, 2024	

=== MLS Next Pro Cup playoffs ===
	Home team	Score	Away team	Attendance	Stadium	Date	Ref
1	Chattanooga FC	1–0	Los Angeles FC 2	10,228	Finley Stadium	November 8, 2026	
2	New York Red Bulls II	3–3 (3–1 p)	Colorado Rapids 2	9,095	Sports Illustrated Stadium	November 8, 2025	
3	North Texas SC	3–2	Philadelphia Union II	7,692	Toyota Stadium	November 9, 2024	
4	Columbus Crew 2	1–3	Austin FC II	7,500	Lower.com Field	October 22, 2023	
5	Columbus Crew 2	4–1	St. Louis City 2	7,446	Lower.com Field	October 8, 2022	
6	St. Louis City 2	0–2	San Jose Earthquakes II	5,227	CityPark	October 1, 2023	
7	Philadelphia Union II	4–0	Columbus Crew 2	4,727	Subaru Park	November 2, 2024	

Key
MLS Next Pro Cup
Conference Final
Conference Semifinal
Otherwise, it is a previous knockout round

== See also ==
- MLS Next
- MLS Reserve League (2005–2014)
