= 2025 MLS Next Pro season =

MLS Next Pro
- Season: 2025
- Dates: March 7 – October 5 (regular season); October 19 – November 8 (playoffs)
- Champions: New York Red Bulls II (1st title)
- Regular season title: St. Louis City 2
- Matches: 406
- Goals: 1,419 (3.5 per match)
- Best player: (United States) Samuel Sarver North Texas SC
- Top goalscorer: (United States) Jason Shokalook Chicago Fire FC II (20 goals)
- Best goalkeeper: (Switzerland) Eldin Jakupović Chattanooga FC
- Biggest home win: CHI 9–2 RBNY July 27
- Biggest away win: SKC 0–4 PT2 July 5 CRN 0–4 PU2 July 19; CRN 0–4 HUN August 2 HOU 0–4 RLM August 9
- Highest scoring: CHI 9–2 RBNY July 27; RBNY 7–4 CC2 August 31; League Record
- Longest winning run: 8 games St. Louis City 2
- Longest unbeaten run: 18 games St. Louis City 2
- Longest winless run: 16 games Sporting Kansas City II
- Longest losing run: 6 games Columbus Crew 2
- Highest attendance: 12,263; STL 3–1 HOU; May 4
- All statistics correct as of October 5, 2025.

The 2025 MLS Next Pro season was the fourth season of MLS Next Pro, the second-tier league of Major League Soccer. The regular season began on March 7 and ended on October 5. The playoffs began on October 19 and ended on November 8.

== Teams ==
=== Stadiums and locations ===
Team	Stadium	Capacity
Atlanta United 2	Fifth Third Stadium	10,200
Austin FC II	Parmer Field	1,000
Carolina Core FC	Truist Point	4,500
Chattanooga FC	Finley Stadium	20,412
Chicago Fire FC II	SeatGeek Stadium	20,000
FC Cincinnati 2	NKU Soccer Stadium	1,000
Colorado Rapids 2	Denver Soccer Stadium	2,000
Columbus Crew 2	Historic Crew Stadium	19,968
Crown Legacy FC	Sportsplex at Matthews	5,000
Houston Dynamo 2	SaberCats Stadium	3,200
Huntsville City FC	Joe W. Davis Stadium	6,000
Inter Miami CF II	Chase Stadium	21,000
Los Angeles FC 2	Titan Stadium	10,000
Minnesota United FC 2	National Sports Center	5,500
New England Revolution II	Gillette Stadium	20,000
New York City FC II	Belson Stadium	2,168
New York Red Bulls II	MSU Soccer Park at Pittser Field	5,000
North Texas SC	Choctaw Stadium	48,114
Orlando City B	Osceola County Stadium	5,300
Philadelphia Union II	Subaru Park	18,500
Portland Timbers 2	Providence Park	25,218
Real Monarchs	Zions Bank Stadium	5,000
Sporting Kansas City II	Children's Mercy Victory Field at Swope Soccer Village	3,500
St. Louis City 2	Energizer Park	22,423
The Town FC	Saint Mary's Stadium	5,500
Toronto FC II	York Lions Stadium	4,000
Tacoma Defiance	Starfire Sports Complex	4,500
Ventura County FC	William Rolland Stadium	3,000
Whitecaps FC 2	Swangard Stadium	5,288

=== Personnel and sponsorship ===
Team	Head coach
Atlanta United 2	(England) Steve Cooke
Austin FC II	(United States) Brett Uttley
Carolina Core FC	(Jamaica) Donovan Ricketts
Chattanooga FC	(England) Chris Nugent
Chicago Fire FC II	(United States) Mike Matkovich
FC Cincinnati 2	(Jamaica) Tyrone Marshall
Colorado Rapids 2	(United States) Erik Bushey
Columbus Crew 2	(Argentina) Federico Higuaín
Crown Legacy FC	(Republic of Ireland) Gary Dicker
Houston Dynamo 2	(Brazil) Marcelo Santos
Huntsville City FC	(United States) Chris O'Neal
Inter Miami CF II	(Argentina) Cristian Ledesma
Los Angeles FC 2	(United States) Junior Gonzalez
Minnesota United FC 2	(United States) Jeremy Hall
New England Revolution II	(United States) Richie Williams
New York City FC II	(United States) Matt Pilkington
New York Red Bulls II	(United States) Michael Bradley
North Texas SC	(Wales) John Gall
Orlando City B	(Argentina) Manuel Goldberg
Philadelphia Union II	(United States) Ryan Richter
Portland Timbers 2	(Canada) Serge Dinkota
Real Monarchs	(England) Mark Lowry
Sporting Kansas City II	(Hungary) István Urbányi
St. Louis City 2	(United States) John Hackworth
The Town FC	(United States) Dan DeGeer
Toronto FC II	(Canada) Gianni Cimini
Tacoma Defiance	(South Africa) Hervé Diese
Ventura County FC	(United States) Matt Taylor
Whitecaps FC 2	(United States) Ricardo Clark

=== Coaching changes ===
Team	Outgoing coach	Manner of departure	Date of vacancy	Position in table	Incoming coach	Date of appointment
St. Louis City 2	(England) David Critchley	Promoted to 1st Team Interim Coach	May 27, 2025	2nd in West	(United States) John Hackworth (interim)	May 27, 2025
New York Red Bulls II	(Uganda) Ibrahim Sekagya	Promoted to 1st Team Assistant	June 10, 2025	1st in East	(United States) Michael Bradley	June 12, 2025

== Regular season ==
Each team played 28 matches during the regular season in a mostly regionalized schedule. Each conference was divided into divisions of seven or eight teams for scheduling. The top eight teams in each conference qualified for the playoffs.

=== Conference standings ===
==== Eastern Conference ====
Pos	Div	Team	Pld	W	SOW	SOL	L	GF	GA	GD	Pts	Qualification
1	NE	New York Red Bulls II (C)	28	17	2	3	6	68	56	+12	58	Qualification for the Playoffs
2	NE	Philadelphia Union II	28	15	5	3	5	64	34	+30	58	Qualification for the Playoffs
3	NE	New England Revolution II	28	14	5	2	7	54	37	+17	54	Qualification for the Playoffs
4	SE	Chattanooga FC	28	13	5	4	6	42	36	+6	53	Qualification for the Playoffs
5	SE	Huntsville City FC	28	14	4	2	8	56	32	+24	52	Qualification for the Playoffs
6	NE	Chicago Fire FC II	28	12	5	2	9	69	58	+11	48	Qualification for the Playoffs
7	NE	FC Cincinnati 2	28	9	7	0	12	40	41	−1	41	Qualification for the Playoffs
8	SE	Carolina Core FC	28	8	5	5	10	42	44	−2	39	Qualification for the Playoffs
9	NE	Toronto FC II	28	10	2	4	12	34	42	−8	38	
10	SE	Atlanta United 2	28	9	2	7	10	44	43	+1	38	
11	SE	Orlando City B	28	9	4	2	13	38	55	−17	37	
12	NE	New York City FC II	28	9	2	4	13	53	61	−8	35	
13	SE	Crown Legacy FC	28	7	3	5	13	45	54	−9	32	
14	SE	Inter Miami CF II	28	6	1	5	16	40	72	−32	25	
15	NE	Columbus Crew 2	28	5	1	5	17	40	64	−24	22	

Source: MLSNP
Rules for classification: 1) points; 2) total regulation wins; 3) total goal differential; 4) total goals scored; 5) total shootout wins; 6) away goal differential; 7) away goals scored; 8) home goals differential; 9) home goals scored; 10) fewer disciplinary points; 11) drawing of lots
(C) Champion

==== Western Conference ====
Pos	Div	Team	Pld	W	SOW	SOL	L	GF	GA	GD	Pts	Qualification
1	FR	St. Louis City 2	28	17	5	1	5	60	37	+23	62	Qualification for the Playoffs
2	PC	The Town FC	28	14	4	2	8	59	36	+23	52	Qualification for the Playoffs
3	FR	Colorado Rapids 2	28	15	1	4	8	55	40	+15	51	Qualification for the Playoffs
4	PC	Real Monarchs	28	13	4	4	7	55	42	+13	51	Qualification for the Playoffs
5	FR	Minnesota United FC 2	28	12	2	4	10	45	42	+3	44	Qualification for the Playoffs
6	FR	North Texas SC	28	11	4	2	11	46	56	−10	43	Qualification for the Playoffs
7	PC	Whitecaps FC 2	28	11	4	1	12	61	54	+7	42	Qualification for the Playoffs
8	PC	Ventura County FC	28	11	2	4	11	48	51	−3	41	Qualification for the Playoffs
9	FR	Austin FC II	28	10	3	5	10	35	36	−1	41	
10	PC	Portland Timbers 2	28	10	2	4	12	47	54	−7	38	
11	FR	Houston Dynamo 2	28	9	4	2	13	40	47	−7	37	
12	PC	Tacoma Defiance	28	10	2	2	14	62	67	−5	36	
13	PC	Los Angeles FC 2	28	9	2	2	15	47	61	−14	33	
14	FR	Sporting Kansas City II	28	3	2	4	19	30	67	−37	17	

Source: MLSNP
Rules for classification: 1) points; 2) total regulation wins; 3) total goal differential; 4) total goals scored; 5) total shootout wins; 6) away goal differential; 7) away goals scored; 8) home goals differential; 9) home goals scored; 10) fewer disciplinary points; 11) drawing of lots

==== Overall table ====
Pos	Div	Team	Pld	W	SOW	SOL	L	GF	GA	GD	Pts	Awards
1	FR	St. Louis City 2	28	17	5	1	5	60	37	+23	62	Regular season champion
2	NE	New York Red Bulls II (C)	28	17	2	3	6	68	56	+12	58	
3	NE	Philadelphia Union II	28	15	5	3	5	64	34	+30	58	
4	NE	New England Revolution II	28	14	5	2	7	54	37	+17	54	
5	SE	Chattanooga FC	28	13	5	4	6	42	36	+6	53	
6	SE	Huntsville City FC	28	14	4	2	8	56	32	+24	52	
7	PC	The Town FC	28	14	4	2	8	59	36	+23	52	
8	FR	Colorado Rapids 2	28	15	1	4	8	55	40	+15	51	
9	PC	Real Monarchs	28	13	4	4	7	55	42	+13	51	
10	NE	Chicago Fire FC II	28	12	5	2	9	69	58	+11	48	
11	FR	Minnesota United FC 2	28	12	2	4	10	45	42	+3	44	
12	FR	North Texas SC	28	11	4	2	11	46	56	−10	43	
13	PC	Whitecaps FC 2	28	11	4	1	12	61	54	+7	42	
14	PC	Ventura County FC	28	11	2	4	11	48	51	−3	41	
15	FR	Austin FC II	28	10	3	5	10	35	36	−1	41	
16	NE	FC Cincinnati 2	28	9	7	0	12	40	41	−1	41	
17	SE	Carolina Core FC	28	8	5	5	10	42	44	−2	39	
18	PC	Portland Timbers 2	28	10	2	4	12	47	54	−7	38	
19	NE	Toronto FC II	28	10	2	4	12	34	42	−8	38	
20	SE	Atlanta United 2	28	9	2	7	10	44	43	+1	38	
21	FR	Houston Dynamo 2	28	9	4	2	13	40	47	−7	37	
22	SE	Orlando City B	28	9	4	2	13	38	55	−17	37	
23	PC	Tacoma Defiance	28	10	2	2	14	62	67	−5	36	
24	NE	New York City FC II	28	9	2	4	13	53	61	−8	35	
25	PC	Los Angeles FC 2	28	9	2	2	15	47	61	−14	33	
26	SE	Crown Legacy FC	28	7	3	5	13	45	54	−9	32	
27	SE	Inter Miami CF II	28	6	1	5	16	40	72	−32	25	
28	NE	Columbus Crew 2	28	5	1	5	17	40	64	−24	22	
29	FR	Sporting Kansas City II	28	3	2	4	19	30	67	−37	17	

Source: MLSNP
Rules for classification: 1) points; 2) total regulation wins; 3) total goal differential; 4) total goals scored; 5) total shootout wins; 6) away goal differential; 7) away goals scored; 8) home goals differential; 9) home goals scored; 10) fewer disciplinary points; 11) drawing of lots
(C) Champion

== Player statistics ==
As of October 5, 2025

=== Goals ===
Rank	Player	Club	Goals
1	(United States) Jason Shokalook	Chicago Fire FC II	20
2	(United States) Samuel Sarver	North Texas SC	19
3	(Japan) Yu Tsukanome	Tacoma Defiance	18
4	(United States) Mykhi Joyner	St. Louis City 2	15
5	(Senegal) Mamadou Billo Diop	Colorado Rapids 2	14
6	(Spain) Jesús Barea	Real Monarchs	13
6	(Haiti) Nelson Pierre	Whitecaps FC 2	13
6	(Nigeria) Nonso Adimabua	The Town FC	13
6	(Guyana) Liam Butts	New England Revolution II	13
6	(Jamaica) Seymour Reid	New York City FC II	13

=== Hat-tricks ===
Player	Team	Against	Score	Date
(Japan) Yu Tsukanome	Tacoma Defiance	Whitecaps FC 2	5–3 (H)	April 6
(United States) Gage Guerra	Portland Timbers 2	Ventura County FC	2–3 (A)	April 23
(Jamaica) Seymour Reid	New York City FC II	New York Red Bulls II	5–2 (H)	May 9
(United States) Mykhi Joyner^{4}	St. Louis City 2	Portland Timbers 2	6–3 (H)	May 23
(Uganda) Ibrahim Kasule	New York Red Bulls II	Crown Legacy FC	2–5 (A)	June 4
(United States) Samuel Sarver^{4}	North Texas SC	Sporting Kansas City II	1–4 (A)	July 18
(Panama) Mijahir Jiménez	New York Red Bulls II	New York City FC II	4–2 (H)	July 20
(United States) Cruz Medina	The Town FC	Real Monarchs	4–0 (H)	July 26
(United States) Jason Shokalook^{4}	Chicago Fire FC II	Sporting Kansas City II	9–2 (H)	July 27
(United States) Jeorgio Kocevski	Ventura County FC	Tacoma Defiance	4–6 (A)	August 1
(United States) Sebastian Gomez	Tacoma Defiance	Ventura County FC	4–6 (H)	August 1
(Senegal) Mamadou Billo Diop	Colorado Rapids 2	Austin FC II	4–1 (H)	August 15
(United States) Nimfasha Berchimas	Crown Legacy FC	Inter Miami CF II	6–0 (H)	August 22
(Argentina) Nehuén Benedetti	New York Red Bulls II	Columbus Crew 2	7–4 (H)	August 31
(United States) Jason Shokalook	Chicago Fire FC II	New York City FC II	4–5 (H)	September 14
(Italy) Sebastiano Musu	New York City FC II	Chicago Fire FC II	4–5 (A)	September 14
(United States) Samuel Sarver	North Texas SC	Los Angeles FC 2	2–4 (A)	October 5

Notes

(H) – Home team
(A) – Away team

Scored four goals.

=== Assists ===
Rank	Player	Club	Assists
1	(Brazil) Marcos Dias	New England Revolution II	13
2	(Italy) Claudio Cassano	Chicago Fire FC II	10
2	(United States) Tate Robertson	Chattanooga FC	10
2	(Panama) Rafael Mosquera	New York Red Bulls II	10
5	(United States) Brendan McSorley	St. Louis City 2	8
5	(United States) Jackson Castro	Whitecaps FC 2	8
7	(Tunisia) Rayan Elloumi	Whitecaps FC 2	7
7	(Argentina) Nehuén Benedetti	New York Red Bulls II	7
7	(Guatemala) Matt Evans	Los Angeles FC 2	7
7	(United States) Missael Rodríguez	The Town FC	7
7	(Finland) Emil Jääskeläinen	St. Louis City 2	7
7	(Italy) Sebastiano Musu	New York City FC II	7
7	(United States) Julien Lacher	New York City FC II	7
7	(United States) Idoh Zeltzer-Zubida	Inter Miami CF II	7
7	(Colombia) Nicolás Rincón	Columbus Crew 2	7
7	(United States) Gabriel Wesseh	Atlanta United 2	7
7	(United States) Christopher Olney Jr	Philadelphia Union II	7
7	(United States) Curt Calov	Minnesota United FC 2	7
7	(United States) Anthony Alaouieh	Columbus Crew 2	7

=== Clean sheets ===
Rank	Player	Club	Clean sheets
1	(Switzerland) Eldin Jakupović	Chattanooga FC	10
2	(United States) Adisa De Rosario	Toronto FC II	8
3	(United States) Francesco Montali	The Town FC	7
4	(United States) Aidan Stokes	New York Red Bulls II	6
4	(United States) Alex Sutton	Carolina Core FC	6
6	(United States) Pierce Holbrook	Philadelphia Union II	5
7	(Brazil) Pedro Cruz	Houston Dynamo 2	4
7	(United States) Cabral Carter	Los Angeles FC 2	4
7	(England) Charlie Farrar	Austin FC II	4
7	(United States) Lukas Burns	Portland Timbers 2	4
7	(United States) Erik Lauta	Huntsville City FC	4
7	(United States) Colin Welsh	St. Louis City 2	4
7	(United States) Zack Campagnolo	Colorado Rapids 2	4
7	(Armenia) Donovan Parisian	New England Revolution II	4

== Playoffs ==
The playoffs featured 15 single elimination matches over four consecutive weekends, beginning October 19 and culminating with the MLS Next Pro Cup on November 8.

The top eight teams in each conference qualified for the playoffs. Matchups during the first two rounds were determined through the pick-your-opponent format within each conference. In the first round, teams ranked first, second, and third earned the right to, in order of ranking, picked their opponent who must have been ranked fifth through eighth. In the second round, the highest ranked team remaining picked an opponent from the two lowest ranked teams remaining.

=== Bracket ===
Conference Quarterfinals (October 19)	Conference Semifinals (October 25 & 26)
E1	New York Red Bulls II	5
E8	Carolina Core FC	1
E1	New York Red Bulls II	5
E6	Chicago Fire FC II	3
E3	New England Revolution II	0
E6	Chicago Fire FC II	1
Eastern Conference
E2	Philadelphia Union II	2
E7	FC Cincinnati II	1
E2	Philadelphia Union II	1
E5	Huntsville City FC	0
E4	Chattanooga FC	0
E5	Huntsville City FC	2
W2	The Town FC	3
W6	North Texas SC	0
W2	The Town FC	2
W3	Colorado Rapids 2	4
W3	Colorado Rapids 2	3
W7	Vancouver Whitecaps 2	2
Western Conference
W1	St. Louis City 2	3
W8	Ventura County FC	0
W1	St. Louis City 2	0
W5	Minnesota United FC 2	2
W4	Real Monarchs	1
W5	Minnesota United FC 2	2

Conference Finals (November 1 & 2)
E1	New York Red Bulls II	2
E2	Philadelphia Union II	1
W3	Colorado Rapids 2	2
W5	Minnesota United FC 2	1

MLS Next Pro Final (November 8)
E1	New York Red Bulls II	3 (3)
W3	Colorado Rapids 2	3 (1)

=== Conference Quarterfinals ===
October 19
4:00 PM EDT

Philadelphia Union II	2–1	FC Cincinnati II
Korzeniowski 10', 64'; Benítez (yellow card) 71'	Report	Dávila 37' (yellow card) 74'; Jimenez (yellow card) 72'

Subaru Park, Chester, Pennsylvania
Referee: Corbyn May

October 19
6:00 PM EDT

New England Revolution II	0–1	Chicago Fire FC II
Butts (yellow card) 43'; Klein (yellow card) 45'	Report	S. Williams (yellow card) 61'; Poreba 86'; Kanyane (yellow card) 89'; Nigg (yellow card) 89'

Gillette Stadium, Foxborough, Massachusetts
Referee: Shawn Tehini

October 19
7:00 PM EDT

New York Red Bulls II	5–1	Carolina Core FC
Mosquera 3' (pen.), 80' (yellow card) 43'; Benedetti 34', 48'; Mitchell 47'; Worth (yellow card) 51'	Report	Chica (yellow card) 2'; Thomas (yellow card) 30'; Pineda (yellow card) 44'; Leonardi (yellow card) 73'; Nzingo 83'

MSU Soccer Park, Montclair, New Jersey
Referee: Luis Arroyo

October 19
7:00 PM EDT

Chattanooga FC	0–2	Huntsville City FC
Garcia (yellow card) 22'; Sar-Sar (yellow card) 66'	Report	Carleton (yellow card) 38'; Mayaka 42'; Barker John (yellow card) 54'; Koffi 76'; Casas (yellow card) 78'

Finley Stadium, Chattanooga, Tennessee
Attendance: 4,732
Referee: Elvis Osmanovic

October 19
2:00 PM MDT

Colorado Rapids 2	3–2	Vancouver Whitecaps 2
García 7'; Bassett (yellow card) 19' (goal) 86'; Amadou (yellow card) 61'; Harris 72' (yellow card) 90+3'	Report	O'Neill 14', 90+1'; Castro (yellow card) 17'; Selemani (yellow card) 44'

Dick's Sporting Goods Park, Commerce City, Colorado
Referee: John Matto

October 19
6:00 PM CDT

St. Louis City 2	3–0	Ventura County FC
Middleby 3' (o.g.); McSorley 81', 87'	Report	Dalgado (yellow card) 54'

Energizer Park, St. Louis, Missouri
Referee: Muhammad Hassan

October 19
6:00 PM MDT

Real Monarchs	1–2	Minnesota United FC 2
Barea 24'; Moisa (yellow card) 31'; Villa (yellow card) 52'; Hezarkhani (red card) 70'	Report	Kamara (yellow card) 61' (goal) 86'; Fischer (yellow card) 63'; Fariña 66' (yellow card) 72'; Chandler (yellow card) 71'

Zions Bank Stadium, Herriman, Utah
Referee: Trevor Wiseman

October 19
6:00 PM PDT

The Town FC	3–0	North Texas SC
Floriani 32'; Rodríguez 48'; Fernandez 82'	Report	Ramirez (yellow card) 27'; Cisset (yellow card) 58'; Urzua (yellow card) 68'

PayPal Park, San Jose, California
Referee: Rodrigo Albuquerque

=== Conference Semifinals ===
October 25
6:00 PM EDT

Philadelphia Union II	1–0	Huntsville City FC
Sequera (yellow card) 14'; Pierre (yellow card) 17'; Korzeniowski 67' (pen.)	Report	Rose (yellow card) 5'; Mayaka (yellow card) 8'; Valdez (yellow card) 66'; Applewhite (yellow card) 72'

Subaru Park, Chester, Pennsylvania
Referee: Matthew Thompson

October 26
7:00 PM EDT

New York Red Bulls II	5–3 (a.e.t.)	Chicago Fire FC II
Rojas 5', 111' (yellow card) 97'; Mitchell 25'; Collahuazo 42'; Diouf (yellow card) 105'; Jiménez 120+2'	Report	Shokalook 6', 28' (yellow card) 89'; Williams 53'

MSU Soccer Park, Montclair, New Jersey
Referee: Benjamin Meyer

October 26
5:00 PM CDT

St. Louis City 2	0–2	Minnesota United FC 2
Glover (yellow card) 84'	Report	Dorsey 17'; Chandler (yellow card) 74'; Randell 80'; Torres (yellow card) 90+1'

Energizer Park, St. Louis, Missouri
Referee: Gerald Flores

October 26
6:00 PM PDT

The Town FC	2–4 (a.e.t.)	Colorado Rapids 2
Ricketts (yellow card) 26' (yellow-red card) 52'; Rinaldi 28' (o.g.) (yellow card) 108'; Adimabua 72'; Donnery (yellow card) 117'	Report	Diop 24'; Harris 60'; Rosa 92' (pen.); García 114' (yellow card) 106'

PayPal Park, San Jose, California
Referee: Mark Verso

=== Conference Finals ===
November 1
7:00 PM EDT

New York Red Bulls II	2–1	Philadelphia Union II
Dos Santos (yellow card) 64'; Mitchell 71', 83'	Report	Korzeniowski 38'; Moore (yellow card) 60'; Sequera (yellow card) 86'

Sports Illustrated Stadium, Harrison, New Jersey
Referee: JC Griggs

November 2
6:30 PM MST

Colorado Rapids 2	2–1	Minnesota United FC 2
Harris 50'; Harper (yellow card) 52'; Cameron 64'; Wathuta (yellow card) 90+2'	Report	Dorsey 20'; Torres (yellow card) 45+2'; Romanshyn (yellow card) 76'

Dick's Sporting Goods Park, Commerce City, Colorado
Referee: Brandon Stevis

=== 2025 MLS Next Pro Cup Final ===
November 8
7:00 PM EST

New York Red Bulls II	3–3 (a.e.t.)	Colorado Rapids 2
Mosquera 65', 81' (pen.); Mitchell (yellow card) 65' (goal) 67'; Worth (yellow card) 90'; Collahuazo (yellow card) 90+6'	Report	Diop 34'; Cameron 45+1'; García 78'; Flores (yellow card) 88'
Penalties
Worth (penalty scored); Jiménez (penalty scored); Rojas (penalty scored)	3–1	(penalty missed) Rosa; (penalty missed) Diop; (penalty scored) García; (penalty missed) Harris

Sports Illustrated Stadium, Harrison, New Jersey
Attendance: 9,095
Referee: Jeremy Scheer

Most Valuable Player: (Panama) Rafael Mosquera (New York Red Bulls II)

== League awards ==
=== Individual awards ===
Award	Winner	Team	Ref.
Golden Boot	(United States) Jason Shokalook	Chicago Fire FC II	
Playmaker of the Year	(Brazil) Marcos Dias	New England Revolution II	
Pathway Player of the Year	(Guyana) Osaze De Rosario	Tacoma Defiance	
Defender of the Year	(United States) Neil Pierre	Philadelphia Union II	
Goalkeeper of the Year	(Switzerland) Eldin Jakupović	Chattanooga FC	
Coach of the Year	(United States) John Hackworth	St. Louis City 2	
Most Valuable Player	(United States) Samuel Sarver	North Texas SC	

=== Best XI ===
Goalkeeper	Defenders	Midfielders	Forwards	Ref
(Switzerland) Eldin Jakupović (CFC) (Goalkeeper of the Year)	(Canada) Gabriel Mikina (STL) (United States) Neil Pierre (PU2) (Defender of the Year) (United States) Tate Robertson (CFC)	(Argentina) Nehuén Benedetti (NYR) (United States) Alan Carleton (HUN) (Brazil) Marcos Dias (NE2) (Playmaker of the Year) (United States) Cruz Medina (TTFC)	(United States) Mykhi Joyner (STL) (United States) Sam Sarver (NTX) (MVP) (United States) Jason Shokalook (CHI) (Golden Boot)	

=== Match Officials of the Year ===
Referee	Assistant Referee	Fourth Official	Ref.
Calin Radosav	Adam Cook	Eric Burton	

=== Monthly awards ===
Week	Player of the Month		Rising Star of the Month		Goalkeeper of the Month		Coach of the Month		Team of the Month	Ref.
Week	Player	Club	Player	Club	Player	Club	Player	Club	Team of the Month	Ref.
March	(United States) Diego Gonzalez	Houston Dynamo 2	(United States) Yuval Cohen	Inter Miami CF II	(United States) Colin Welsh	St. Louis City 2	(England) David Critchley	St. Louis City 2	St. Louis City 2	
April	(Guyana) Osaze De Rosario	Tacoma Defiance	(United States) Colton Swan	Colorado Rapids 2	(Brazil) Pedro Cruz	Houston Dynamo 2	(Puerto Rico) Jeremy Hall	Minnesota United FC 2	Chattanooga FC	
May	(United States) Mykhi Joyner	St. Louis City 2	(United States) Dylan Vanney	Ventura County FC	(United States) Aidan Stokes	New York Red Bulls II	(United States) Dan Degeer	The Town FC	The Town FC	
June	(Argentina) Nehuén Benedetti	New York Red Bulls II	(United States) Colton Swan	Colorado Rapids 2	(United States) Adisa De Rosario	Toronto FC II	(United States) Ryan Richter	Philadelphia Union II	St. Louis City 2	
July	(United States) Sam Sarver	North Texas SC	(United States) Dylan Vanney	Ventura County FC	(United States) Christian Olivares	St. Louis City 2	(United States) John Hackworth	St. Louis City 2	Chicago Fire FC II	
August	(Senegal) Billo Diop	Colorado Rapids 2	(United States) Gabriel Wesseh	Atlanta United 2	(United States) Francesco Montali	The Town FC	(United States) Erik Bushey	Colorado Rapids 2	The Town FC	
September	(United States) Jason Shokalook	Chicago Fire FC II	(Mexico) Ademar Chávez	FC Cincinnati 2	(Switzerland) Eldin Jakupović	Chattanooga FC	(Jamaica) Tyrone Marshall	FC Cincinnati 2	FC Cincinnati 2	

=== Weekly awards ===
Week	Player of the Matchweek		Rising Star of the Matchweek		Goal of the Matchweek		Team of the Matchweek	Ref.
Week	Player	Club	Player	Club	Player	Club	Team of the Matchweek	Ref.
1	(Liberia) Jimmy Farkarlun	Austin FC II	(United States) Dylan Vanney	Ventura County FC	(Guatemala) Matt Evans	Los Angeles FC 2	St. Louis City 2	
2	(United States) Aiden Hezarkhani	Real Monarchs	(Jamaica) Seymour Reid	New York City FC II	(Mexico) Alex Moreno	Portland Timbers 2	Tacoma Defiance	
3	(United States) Julian Hall	New York Red Bulls II	(United States) Yuval Cohen	Inter Miami CF II	(Canada) Gabriel Mikina	St. Louis City 2	St. Louis City 2	
4	(Japan) Yu Tsukanome	Tacoma Defiance	(Argentina) Mateo Saja	Inter Miami CF II	(Uganda) Ibrahim Kasule	New York Red Bulls II	Carolina Core FC	
5	(Guatemala) Matt Evans	Los Angeles FC 2	(Puerto Rico) Ian Charles	North Texas SC	(Guatemala) Matt Evans	Los Angeles FC 2	Philadelphia Union II	
6	(Romania) Ștefan Chirilă	FC Cincinnati 2	(United States) Colton Swan	Colorado Rapids 2	(Republic of Ireland) Glory Nzingo	Carolina Core FC	Huntsville City FC	
7	(United States) Gage Guerra	Portland Timbers 2	(United States) Gabriel Wesseh	Atlanta United 2	(United States) Gavin Gall	North Texas SC	Tacoma Defiance	
8	(Finland) Emil Jääskeläinen	St. Louis City 2	(United States) Landon Hickam	North Texas SC	(United States) Landon Hickam	North Texas SC	Chicago Fire FC II	
9	(Jamaica) Seymour Reid	New York City FC II	(United States) Dylan Vanney	Ventura County FC	(Argentina) Hernán López	The Town FC	Philadelphia Union II	
10	(United States) Justin Ellis	Orlando City B	(United States) Julian Lacher	New York City FC II	(Mexico) Alex Moreno	Portland Timbers 2	Portland Timbers 2	
11	(United States) Mykhi Joyner	St. Louis City 2	(United States) Ivan Schmid	Inter Miami CF II	(United States) Mykhi Joyner	St. Louis City 2	The Town FC	
12	(Republic of Ireland) Glory Nzingo	Carolina Core FC	(Tunisia) Rayan Elloumi	Whitecaps FC 2	(Haiti) Steeve Louis Jean	Chattanooga FC	Chicago Fire FC II	
13	(Uganda) Ibrahim Kasule	New York Red Bulls II	(United States) Idoh Zeltzer-Zubida	Inter Miami CF II	(Colombia) Jhon Solís	Orlando City B	St. Louis City 2	
14	(Germany) Luis Müller	Ventura County FC	(Canada) Yuma Tsuji	Whitecaps FC 2	(United States) Jathan Juarez	Carolina Core FC	New York Red Bulls II	
15	(United States) Alan Carleton	Huntsville City FC	(United States) Colton Swan	Colorado Rapids 2	(United States) Brian Romero	Crown Legacy FC	Whitecaps FC 2	
16	(United States) Snyder Brunell	Tacoma Defiance	(Canada) Antone Bossenberry	Toronto FC II	(United States) Dylan Borso	Chicago Fire FC II	Chicago Fire FC II	
17	(United States) Alan Carleton	Huntsville City FC	(United States) Patrick Los	Chicago Fire FC II	(Serbia) Andrej Subotić	Crown Legacy FC	Philadelphia Union II	
18	(United States) Cavan Sullivan	Philadelphia Union II	(United States) Adrian Mendoza	Crown Legacy FC	(United States) Gavin Turner	Chattanooga FC	St. Louis City 2	
19	(United States) Samuel Sarver	North Texas SC	(United States) Dylan Vanney	Ventura County FC	(United States) Aiden Hezarkhani	Real Monarchs	Philadelphia Union II	
20	(United States) Jason Shokalook	Chicago Fire FC II	(United States) Carson Locker	FC Cincinnati 2	(Canada) Nathaniel Edwards	Toronto FC II	Chicago Fire FC II	
21	(United States) Jeorgio Kocevski	Ventura County FC	(South Korea) Evan Lim	New York City FC II	(United States) Kellan LeBlanc	Philadelphia Union II	Chicago Fire FC II	
22	(Panama) Mijahir Jiménez	New York Red Bulls II	(United States) Carson Locker	FC Cincinnati 2	(United States) Nathan Koehler	Chattanooga FC	Real Monarchs	
23	(Senegal) Billo Diop	Colorado Rapids 2	(United States) David Molenda	Chicago Fire FC II	(Croatia) Tommy Mihalić	Los Angeles FC 2	Huntsville City FC	
24	(Guyana) Liam Butts	New England Revolution II	(United States) Gavin Zambrano	Los Angeles FC 2	(United States) Griffin Dillon	Real Monarchs	Crown Legacy FC	
25	(Panama) Rafael Mosquera	New York Red Bulls II	(United States) Chase Nagle	Chicago Fire FC II	(Panama) Rafael Mosquera	New York Red Bulls II	Atlanta United 2	
26	(Ivory Coast) Kevin Gbamblé	Columbus Crew 2	(United States) Kai Zeruhn	Minnesota United FC 2	(United States) Anthony Samways	Sporting Kansas City II	Carolina Core FC	
27	(Italy) Sebastiano Musu	New York City FC II	(United States) Dennis Nelich	New York Red Bulls II	(United States) Luke Husakiwsky	Chattanooga FC	Carolina Core FC	
28	(Nigeria) Nonso Adimabua	The Town FC	(United States) Will Kuisel	FC Cincinnati 2	(Honduras) Jaidyn Contreras	North Texas SC	Philadelphia Union II	
29	(Romania) Ștefan Chirilă	FC Cincinnati 2	(United States) Noah Newman	Tacoma Defiance	(France) Paul Leonardi	Carolina Core FC	Atlanta United 2	
30	(United States) Samuel Sarver	North Texas SC	(Mexico) Ademar Chavez	FC Cincinnati 2	(Guatemala) Matt Evans	Los Angeles FC 2	FC Cincinnati 2	

== See also ==
- 2025 Major League Soccer season
