= 2024 MLS SuperDraft =

College draft for soccer teams

General information
- Sport: Soccer
- Date: December 19, 2023
- Time: 3:00 p.m. EST
- Network: MLS Season Pass

Overview
- 87 total selections in 3 rounds
- League: Major League Soccer
- Teams: 29
- First selection: Tyrese Spicer (Toronto FC)

The 2024 MLS SuperDraft was the 25th edition of the MLS SuperDraft, a sports draft to select amateur, usually collegiate, soccer players that are not affiliate with an MLS club, or college soccer players that had their Homegrown player rights relinquished by their parent MLS club. The draft was held on December 19, 2023, marking the second year in a row that the draft was held in December. Despite the draft being held in 2023, the draft retained the 2024 branding.

Ahead of the 2024 draft, MLS has expanded the player eligibility criteria for the SuperDraft. For the first time in league history, collegiate sophomores and juniors, alongside seniors and above, and Generation adidas signees in the selection pool were eligible for the draft, similar to eligibility in the Major League Baseball draft. Drafted players retaining college eligibility could opt to return to school for further development but would forfeit future draft eligibility. The drafting club retains SuperDraft Priority for approximately two years if a selected player chooses to return to college or remains unsigned.

== Format ==
Historically, the MLS SuperDraft has closely resembled that of the NFL draft:

1. Any expansion teams receive the first picks. This season, no new expansion teams entered MLS.
2. Non-playoff clubs receive the next picks in reverse order of prior season finish.
3. Teams that made the MLS Cup Playoffs are then ordered by which round of the playoffs they are eliminated.
4. The winners of the MLS Cup are given the last selection, and the losers the penultimate selection.

== Player selection ==
Player key
*	Denotes player who has been selected for an MLS Best XI team						
^	Member of 2024 Generation Adidas class						
†	Player who was named to an MLS Best XI and Generation Adidas						
Signed key
27	Denotes player who signed for a MLS team (Division I)						
2	Denotes player who signed for a USL Championship team (Division II)						
30	Denotes player who signed for a MLS Next Pro, USL League One or NISA team (Division III)						
0	Denotes player who signed for a team outside the United States soccer league system						
14	Denotes player who returned to college team						
Positions key
GK	Goalkeeper	DF	Defender	MF	Midfielder	FW	Forward

=== Round 1 ===
P	MLS team	Player	Year	Pos.	College	Conference	Academy team(s)	Other team(s)	Signed
1	Toronto FC	(Trinidad and Tobago) Tyrese Spicer	Senior	FW	Lipscomb	ASUN	Central FC	Tennessee SC; Des Moines Menace	(Canada) Toronto FC
2	Colorado Rapids	(Trinidad and Tobago) Wayne Frederick	Sophomore	MF	Duke	ACC	Bethesda SC	—N/a	(United States) Colorado Rapids
3	FC Dallas (Note: Inter Miami CF → FC Dallas. FC Dallas acquired the natural first round pick in the 2024 MLS Super Draft from Inter Miami CF in exchange for $250,000 in 2024 GAM, $50,000 in 2025 GAM and FC Dallas' natural first round pick.)	(United States) Logan Farrington	Senior	FW	Oregon State	PAC-12	Milwaukee Bavarians	Ventura County Fusion	(United States) FC Dallas
4	Colorado Rapids (Note: LA Galaxy → Colorado Rapids. Colorado Rapids acquired the natural first round pick in the 2024 MLS Super Draft, and $50,000 in condition 2024 GAM from LA Galaxy in exchange for Michael Barrios.)	(Canada) Kimani Stewart-Baynes	Freshman	FW	Maryland	Big Ten	Vaughan SC	HFX Wanderers FC	(United States) Colorado Rapids
5	Austin FC	(United States) Nate Jones	Junior	DF	Washington	PAC-12	Crossfire Premier	Crossfire Redmond; Vermont Green	(United States) Colorado Rapids
6	Chicago Fire FC	(United States) Bryan Dowd	Senior	GK	Notre Dame	ACC	Chicago Fire FC; Chicago FC United	Chicago FC United	(United States) Chicago Fire FC
7	D.C. United	(United States) Jacob Murrell	Sophomore	FW	Georgetown	Big East	Pipeline SC	Annapolis Blues	(United States) D.C. United
8	New York City FC	(Sierra Leone) Malachi Jones	Sophomore	FW	Lipscomb	ASUN	—N/a	Tennessee SC	(United States) New York City FC
9	Minnesota United FC	(Spain) Hugo Bacharach	Senior	DF	Indiana	Big Ten	Villarreal	Flint City Bucks	(United States) Minnesota United FC
10	CF Montréal	(United States) Grayson Doody	Senior	DF	UCLA	PAC-12	Beach FC; LA Galaxy	—N/a	(Canada) CF Montréal
11	Nashville SC (Note: Portland Timbers → Nashville SC. Nashville SC acquired the natural first round pick in the 2024 MLS Super Draft from Portland Timbers in exchange for $75,000 in 2024 GAM and $50,000 in 2025 GAM.)	(United States) Wyatt Meyer	Junior	DF	California	PAC-12	ACC Mavericks	Project 51O	(United States) California
12	New York Red Bulls (Note: Charlotte FC → Colorado Rapids → New York Red Bulls. Colorado Rapids acquired the natural first round pick in the 2024 MLS SuperDraft, $50,000 in 2023 GAM, and $50,000 in condition GAM from Charlotte FC in exchange for their natural first round pick in the 2023 MLS SuperDraft. Subsequently, the New York Red Bulls acquired the 12th overall pick in the 2024 MLS SuperDraft from Colorado Rapids for the 14th overall pick in the 2024 MLS SuperDraft and $50,000 in 2024 GAM.)	(United States) Aidan O'Connor	Senior	DF	Virginia	ACC		—N/a	(United States) New York Red Bulls
13	San Jose Earthquakes	(United States) Jamar Ricketts	Senior	DF	Cal State Northridge	Big West	Cedar Stars	Ventura County Fusion	(United States) San Jose Earthquakes
14	Charlotte FC (Note: New York Red Bulls → Colorado Rapids → Charlotte FC. Colorado Rapids the natural first and second round draft pick in the 2024 MLS SuperDraft from New York Red Bulls for the 12th overall pick in the 2024 MLS SuperDraft and $50,000 in 2024 GAM. Subsequently, Charlotte FC acquired the 14th pick in the 2024 MLS Super Draft from Charlotte FC in exchange for $75,000 in 2024 GAM and $50,000 in 2025 GAM.)	(England) Tyger Smalls	Junior	FW	Loyola Marymount	WCC	Norwich City; Tottenham Hotspur	Haverhill Rovers; Saffron Walden Town; Felixstowe & Walton United	(United States) Charlotte FC
15	Inter Miami CF (Note: FC Dallas → Inter Miami CF. Inter Miami CF acquired the natural first round pick in the 2024 MLS Super Draft, $250,000 in 2024 GAM, and $50,000 in 2025 GAM from FC Dallas in exchange for Inter Miami CF natural first round pick in the 2024 MLS Super Draft.)	(Italy) Yannick Bright	Senior	MF	New Hampshire	America East	GS Arconatese 1926	NC Fusion	(United States) Inter Miami CF
16	Real Salt Lake (Note: Vancouver Whitecaps FC → Real Salt Lake. Real Salt Lake acquired the natural first round pick in the 2024 MLS Super Draft and $300,000 in GAM from Vancouver Whitecaps FC in exchange for MLS Rights to Sergio Córdova.)	(Jamaica) Matthew Bell	Sophomore	FW	Marshall	Sun Belt	Real Mona; Kingston Football Academy	Valeo FC	(United States) Real Salt Lake
17	St. Louis City SC (Note: Nashville SC → St. Louis City SC. St. Louis City SC acquired the natural first round pick in the 2024 MLS SuperDraft from Nashville SC in exchange for GAM and the 50th Overall pick.)	(Japan) Hosei Kijima	Senior	MF	Wake Forest	ACC	IMG Academy	Sarasota Paradise	(United States) St. Louis City SC
18	Real Salt Lake	(United States) Kevin Bonilla	Senior	DF	Portland	WCC	FC Dallas	North Texas SC; United PDX	(United States) Real Salt Lake
19	Atlanta United FC	(Jamaica) Jayden Hibbert	Sophomore	GK	UConn	Big East	Cedar Stars; New York Red Bulls	Cedar Stars Rush	(United States) Atlanta United 2
20	Minnesota United FC (Note: New England Revolution → Minnesota United FC. Minnesota United FC acquired the natural first round and natural third round pick in the 2024 MLS Super Draft from New England Revolution in exchange for $100,000 in 2024 GAM.)	(Canada) Marcus Caldeira	Sophomore	FW	West Virginia	Sun Belt	Sigma FC	Forge FC; Sigma FC	(United States) West Virginia
21	Orlando City SC (Note: St. Louis City SC → Colorado Rapids → Orlando City SC. Colorado Rapids acquired the natural first round pick in the 2024 MLS Super Draft and $150,000 in 2023 GAM from St. Louis City SC in exchange for Anthony Markanich.)	(United States) Jeorgio Kocevski	Senior	MF	Syracuse	ACC	Rochester New York FC	Syracuse FC; Ocean City Nor'easters; Long Island Rough Riders	(United States) Orlando City SC
22	Sporting Kansas City	(United States) Ryan Schewe	Senior	GK	Georgetown	Big East	Atlanta United FC	Apotheos FC; Westchester Flames	(United States) Sporting Kansas City
23	Seattle Sounders FC	(United States) Kalani Kossa-Rienzi	Junior	DF	Washington	PAC-12	—N/a	Crossfire Redmond	(United States) Tacoma Defiance
24	Inter Miami CF (Note: Philadelphia Union → Inter Miami CF. Inter Miami CF acquired the natural first round pick in the 2024 MLS Super Draft, $225,000 in 2023 GAM, and Priority Homegrown Rights to Inter Miami CF II striker Shanyder Borgelin from Philadelphia Union in exchange for Damion Lowe and a future sell-on percentage for Shanyder Borgelin.)	(Northern Ireland) Ryan Carmichael	Senior	FW	Hofstra	CAA	Loughgall; Portadown	Georgia Revolution; Long Island Rough Riders	(United States) Inter Miami CF II
25	Orlando City SC	(Japan) Yutaro Tsukada	Senior	FW	West Virginia	Sun Belt	FC Tokyo	Capital FC Atletico	(United States) Orlando City B
26	Houston Dynamo FC	(Ghana) Stephen Annor Gyamfi	Freshman	FW	Virginia	ACC	Montverde Academy	—N/a	(United States) Houston Dynamo
27	FC Cincinnati	(United States) Brian Schaefer	Senior	DF	South Florida	AAC	Jacksonville Armada	St. Petersburg FC; Tampa Bay United	(United States) FC Cincinnati 2
28	Los Angeles FC	(Australia) Jackson Lee	Senior	GK	West Virginia	Sun Belt	Perth Glory	Seacoast United Phantoms	(United States) Rhode Island FC
29	Columbus Crew	(United States) Jayden Da	Junior	FW	Duquesne	A-10	OBGC Rangers	Toledo Villa	(United States) Columbus Crew 2

=== Round 2 ===
P	MLS team	Player	Year	Pos.	College	Conference	Academy team(s)	Other team(s)	Signed
30	Toronto FC	(United States) Joey Maher	Senior	DF	Indiana	Big Ten	Saint Louis FC	—N/a	(United States) Saint Louis
31	Austin FC (Note: Colorado Rapids → Austin FC. Austin FC acquired the natural second round pick in the 2024 MLS SuperDraft and $250,000 in 2024 GAM from Colorado Rapids in exchange for playing rights for Nate Jones and Austin FC natural second round pick in the 2024 MLS SuperDraft.)	(Liberia) Bryant Farkarlun	Senior	MF	UT Rio Grande Valley	WAC	African United FC	Houston FC	(United States) Austin FC II
32	Inter Miami CF	(Brazil) Leo Afonso	Senior	FW	Virginia	ACC	Boca United; Philadelphia Union		(United States) Inter Miami CF II
33	Chicago Fire FC (Note: LA Galaxy → Atlanta United FC → Chicago Fire. Atlanta United FC acquired the natural second round pick in the 2024 MLS Super Draft from LA Galaxy in exchange for player rights for Miguel Berry. Subsequently Chicago Fire FC acquired the natural second and third round pick in the 2024 MLS Super Draft from Atlanta United FC for $50,000 of 2024 GAM.)	(Canada) Olu Oyegunle	Junior	DF	Syracuse	ACC	Sigma FC	Forge FC	(United States) Chicago Fire FC II
34	Colorado Rapids (Note: Austin FC → Colorado Rapids. Colorado Rapids acquired the natural second round pick in the 2024 MLS SuperDraft and Nate Jones from Austin FC in exchange for their natural second round pick and $250,000 in 2024 GAM.)	(United States) Palmer Ault	Sophomore	MF	Butler	Big East	Indiana Fire; Indy Eleven	Flint City Bucks	(United States) Butler
35	Chicago Fire FC	(United States) Jason Shokalook	Senior	FW	Akron	Big East	Internationals SC	Flint City Bucks	(United States) Chicago Fire FC II
36	D.C. United	(United States) Brandon Parrish	Senior	MF	Clemson	ACC			(United States) Crown Legacy FC
37	Real Salt Lake (Note: New York City FC → Real Salt Lake. Real Salt Lake acquired the natural second round pick in the 2024 MLS Super Draft from New York City FC in trade.)	(Grenada) Damien Barker John	Sophomore	FW	Louisville	ACC	Met Oval; New York City FC; Queensboro FC		(United States) Real Monarchs
38	Charlotte FC (Note: Minnesota United FC → Charlotte FC. Charlotte FC acquired the natural second round pick in the 2024 MLS Super Draft from Minnesota United FC in trade.)	(United States) Jahlane Forbes	Senior	DF	Wake Forest	ACC	Orlando City SC	SIMA Águilas; Orlando City B Manhattan SC	(United States) Charlotte FC
39	CF Montréal	(Canada) Malik Henry	Senior	MF	Akron	Big East	Saltfleet Stoney Creek SC; Toronto FC	Flint City Bucks	(United States) Akron
40	Portland Timbers	(United States) Kyle Linhares	Senior	MF	Georgetown	Big East	PDA	FC Motown	(United States) Portland Timbers 2
41	Charlotte FC	(United States) Jacob Babalai	Senior	FW	Portland	WCC	Eastside Timbers; Westside Timbers	United PDX	
42	San Jose Earthquakes	(United States) Beau Leroux	Junior	MF	San Jose State	WAC	Santa Cruz Breakers	Project 51O	(United States) The Town FC
43	Colorado Rapids (Note: New York Red Bulls → Colorado Rapids. Colorado Rapids the natural first and second round draft pick in the 2024 MLS SuperDraft from New York Red Bulls for the 12th overall pick in the 2024 MLS SuperDraft and $50,000 in 2024 GAM.)	(Brazil) Anderson Rosa	Senior	DF	UCF	Sun Belt	Montverde Academy		(United States) UCF
44	FC Dallas	(United States) Turner Humphrey	Senior	DF	Oregon State	Pac-12	Blues Youth SC	Redlands FC	(United States) North Texas SC
45	Vancouver Whitecaps FC	(England) Eliot Goldthorp	Junior	DF	Hofstra	CAA	Manchester United; Leeds United; Bradford City	Des Moines Menace	(Canada) Whitecaps FC 2
46	LA Galaxy (Note: Nashville SC → LA Galaxy. LA Galaxy acquired the natural second round pick in the 2024 MLS Super Draft and $50,000 in 2023 GAM from Nashville SC in exchange for Nick DePuy.)	(United States) Ethan Brandt	Senior	GK	Western Michigan	MVC	FRAM	Midwest United	
47	Real Salt Lake	(United States) Josh Jones	Junior	DF	Louisville	ACC	Philadelphia Ukrainians	Philadelphia Ukrainians; Ocean City Nor'easters	
48	Atlanta United FC	(Spain) Javier Armas	Senior	DF	Oregon State	Pac-12	Deportivo de La Coruña	CD Vallesco	(United States) Atlanta United 2
49	D.C. United (Note: New England Revolution → D.C. United. D.C. United acquired the natural second round pick in the 2024 MLS Super Draft, and $50,000 in condition 2025 GAM from New England Revolution in exchange for the Right of First Refusal to sign former Homegrown midfielder Ian Harkes.)	(United States) Aldair Sanchez		DF	North Carolina (Note: Aldair Sanchez was listed as drafted from Sacramento Republic, not North Carolina.)	ACC	Portland Timbers	Sacramento Republic FC	(United States) Sacramento Republic FC
50	Nashville SC (Note: St. Louis City FC → Nashville SC)	(United States) Kevin Carmichael	Junior	DF	California	Pac-12	Real So Cal	Ventura County Fusion	(United States) California
51	Sporting Kansas City	(United States) Dyson Clapier	Senior	MF	Akron	Big East	Portland Timbers	Portland Timbers 2 Park City Red Wolves; Akron City FC	(United States) Akron
52	Seattle Sounders FC	(United States) Antino Lopez	Senior	DF	Duke	ACC	Shattuck St. Mary's; Seattle Sounders FC	Tobacco Road FC; FC Tucson	(United States) Tacoma Defiance
53	Philadelphia Union	(United States) Stas Korzeniowski	Junior	FW	Penn	Ivy League	PDA	Ballard FC	(United States) Philadelphia Union II
54	Orlando City SC	(United States) Filip Mirkovic	Senior	MF	Pittsburgh	ACC	New York City FC	Long Island Rough Riders	(United States) Crown Legacy FC
55	Houston Dynamo FC	(Senegal) Ousmane Sylla	Senior	MF	Clemson	ACC	Montverde Academy		(United States) Houston Dynamo FC
56	FC Cincinnati	(France) Kenji Mboma Dem	Senior	FW	Dayton	A10	Paris Saint-Germain; Black Rock FC		(United States) FC Cincinnati 2
57	Los Angeles FC	(United States) Kenny Nielsen	Senior	DF	Georgetown	Big East	Pateadores		(United States) Los Angeles FC 2
58	Columbus Crew	(United States) Zach Zengue	Sophomore	MF	Georgetown	Big East	Shattuck St. Mary's	Vermont Green	(United States) Georgetown

=== Round 3 ===
P	MLS team	Player	Year	Pos.	College	Conference	Academy team(s)	Other team(s)	Signed
59	Toronto FC	(United States) Patrick McDonald	Junior	MF	Indiana	Big Ten	Indy Eleven	North Carolina Fusion U23	(United States) Indiana
60	Colorado Rapids	(Cayman Islands) Gunnar Studenhofft	Senior	FW	Manhattan	MAAC	Orlando City SC	Cedar Stars; Manhattan SC	(United States) Manhattan
61	Inter Miami CF	(Spain) Pep Casas	Senior	MF	UNC-Wilmington	CAA	Barcelona; Ipswich Town; Europa		(United States) Inter Miami CF II
62	LA Galaxy	(United States) Tucker Lepley	Senior	MF	UCLA	PAC-12	Charlotte Soccer Academy; Sporting Kansas City	Swope Park Rangers	(United States) LA Galaxy
63	Philadelphia Union (Note: Austin FC → Philadelphia Union. Philadelphia Union acquired the natural third round pick in the 2024 MLS Super Draft from Austin FC and up to $125,000 in 2024 GAM in exchange for loan for Brandan Craig.)	(United States) Zachary Bohane	Sophomore	FW	Stanford	PAC-12	De Anza Force	Project 51O	
64	Chicago Fire FC	(England) Laurence Wootton	Senior	MF	Ohio State	Big Ten	Stoke City; Cardiff City		(United States) Chicago Fire FC
65	D.C. United	(United States) Nathan Crockford	Junior	GK	Wisconsin	Big Ten	Chicago Fire FC	Chicago City SC	(United States) D.C. United
66	New York City FC	(United States) Taylor Calheira	Senior	FW	UMBC	AmEast		Christos FC	(United States) New York City FC II
67	Minnesota United FC	(Germany) Morris Duggan	Senior	DF	Marshall	Sun Belt	Kirchheimer SC; FC Ismaning	VfR Garching; Kirchheimer SC; Des Moines Menace	(United States) Minnesota United FC
68	CF Montréal	(United States) Eli Conway	Sophomore	FW	Connecticut	Big East	Cedar Stars Academy; New York Red Bulls	Cedar Stars Rush	
69	Portland Timbers	(United States) Gage Guerra	Junior	FW	Louisville	ACC	Houston Dynamo FC		
70	Charlotte FC	(United States) Nathan Richmond	Sophomore	MF	Clemson	ACC	Atlanta United FC; IMG Academy	Sarasota Paradise	
71	San Jose Earthquakes	(United States) Riley Lynch	Junior	FW	Saint Mary's	WCC	Phoenix Rising FC		(United States) The Town FC
72	Chicago Fire FC (Note: Atlanta United FC → Chicago Fire FC. Chicago Fire FC acquired the natural second and third round pick in the 2024 MLS Super Draft from Atlanta United FC for $50,000 of 2024 GAM.)	(United States) Shane de Flores	Junior	MF	Stanford	PAC-12	Ballistic United; De Anza Force		
73	FC Dallas	(Denmark) Mads Westergren	Junior	DF	SMU	AAC	Lyngby BK; HB Køge; Brøndby IF	Long Island Rough Riders	(United States) North Texas SC
74	Vancouver Whitecaps FC	(Canada) Nicolas Fleuriau Chateau	Senior	FW	St. John's	Big East	West Ottawa SC	Manhattan SC	(Canada) Whitecaps FC 2
75	Nashville SC	(United States) Bryce Boneau	Junior	MF	Notre Dame	ACC	Solar FC; FC Dallas	Texas United	
76	Real Salt Lake	(United States) Maximus Jennings	Junior	DF	Georgetown	Big East	Black Rock FC	FC Motown	
77	Atlanta United FC	(Denmark) Casper Mols	Sophomore	GK	Kentucky	Sun Belt	SönderjyskE	SC Weiche Flensburg 08; FC Tucson	
78	Minnesota United FC (Note: New England Revolution → Minnesota United FC. Minnesota United FC acquired the natural first round and natural third round pick in the 2024 MLS Super Draft from New England Revolution in exchange for $100,000 in 2024 GAM.)	(Senegal) Babacar Niang	Junior	MF	Wake Forest	ACC			
79	St. Louis City SC	(United States) Brendan McSorley	Senior	FW	Providence	Big East	PDA	FC Motown	(United States) St. Louis City 2
80	Sporting Kansas City	(United States) Jonathan Robinson	Senior	DF	Western Michigan	MVC	Chicago Magic PSG Academy; Chicago FC United	Chicago FC United; AFC Ann Arbor; Flint City Bucks	(United States) Sporting Kansas City II
81	Seattle Sounders FC	(Sierra Leone) Buba Fofanah	Junior	FW	Portland	WCC	Santa Barbara Elite	Ventura County Fusion	(United States) Portland
82	Philadelphia Union	(United States) Francesco Montali	Senior	GK	Boston	Patriot League	Orlando City SC; New York Red Bulls		(United States) San Jose Earthquakes
83	Orlando City SC	(Japan) Riyon Tori	Junior	MF	Charlotte	AAC	Cerezo Osaka	Kwansei Gakuin; Manhattan SC	(United States) Charlotte
84	Real Salt Lake (Note: Houston Dynamo FC → Real Salt Lake. Real Salt Lake acquired the natural third round pick in the 2024 MLS Super Draft from Houston Dynamo FC in exchange for the Right of First Refusal to former DF Homegrown Tate Schmitt.)	(United States) Ruben Mesalles	Junior	DF	Duke	ACC	Gimnàstic; IMG Academy	St. Petersburg FC	
85	Toronto FC (Note: FC Cincinnati → Austin FC → Toronto FC. Austin FC acquired the natural third round pick in the 2024 MLS Super Draft from FC Cincinnati in exchange for rights to Kipp Keller, subsequently Austin FC traded 2024 MLS Super Draft third round pick and 5th overall pick in the 2023 MLS Re-Entry Draft Stage 1 in exchange for Toronto FC's 1st overall pick in the 2023 MLS Re-Entry Draft.)	(United States) Fletcher Bank	Sophomore	MF	Stanford	PAC-12	CalSouth		(United States) Stanford
86	CF Montréal (Note: Los Angeles FC → CF Montréal. CF Montréal acquired the natural third round pick in the 2024 MLS Super Draft and $200,000 in 2022 GAM from Los Angeles FC in exchange for a 2022 International Slot.)	(United States) Carson Hodgson	Sophomore	MF	Western Michigan	MVC		Oakland County	
87	Columbus Crew	(United States) Luke Pruter	Senior	GK	UC Irvine	Big West	LA Galaxy; Barça Academy	LA Galaxy II	(United States) Columbus Crew 2

== Notable undrafted players ==
=== Homegrown players ===
This is a list of players who were draft eligible, but previously played on the academy team of an MLS side, and were signed directly to the first team roster prior to the SuperDraft.

Original MLS team	Player	Position	College	Conference	Notes	Ref.
Atlanta United FC	(United States) Garrison Tubbs	DF	Wake Forest	ACC	Shortly after being signed by Atlanta, Tubbs was dealt to D.C. United.	
FC Dallas	(United States) Malik Henry-Scott	FW	Tulsa	AAC		
Philadelphia Union	(United States) Nick Pariano	MF	Duke	ACC		

== Summary ==
=== Selections by college athletic conference ===
Conference	Round 1	Round 2	Round 3	Total
NCAA Division I conferences
ACC	6	9	7	22
America East	1	0	1	2
American	1	0	0	1
Atlantic 10	1	1	0	2
ASUN	2	0	0	2
Big East	3	7	4	14
Big Ten	2	1	3	6
Big West	1	0	1	2
CAA	1	1	1	3
Ivy	0	1	0	1
MAAC	0	0	1	1
Missouri Valley	0	1	2	3
Pac-12	5	3	4	12
Patriot	0	0	1	1
Sun Belt	4	1	2	7
WAC	0	2	0	2
WCC	2	1	2	5

=== Schools with multiple draft selections ===
Selections	Schools
6	Georgetown
4	Duke
3	Akron, Clemson, Indiana, Louisville, Oregon State, Portland, Stanford, Virginia, West Virginia, Western Michigan
2	California, Hofstra, Lipscomb, Marshall, Notre Dame, Syracuse, UConn, UCLA, Washington

== Trades ==
Round 1:

Round 2:

Round 3:
