= Seymour Reid =

Seymour Reid may refer to:

- Seymour Reid (cricketer) (1914-2004), South African cricketer
- Seymour Reid (footballer) (born 2008), Jamaican footballer
