= Jamar Ricketts =

American soccer player (born 2001)

Personal information
- Date of birth: October 24, 2001 (age 25)
- Place of birth: Montclair, New Jersey, United States
- Height: 5 ft 9 in (1.75 m)
- Position: Defender

Team information
- Current team: San Jose Earthquakes
- Number: 2

Youth career
- Cedar Stars Academy

College career
Years	Team	Apps	(Gls)
2021–2023	Cal State Northridge Matadors	55	(16)

Senior career*
Years	Team	Apps	(Gls)
2021	Cedar Stars Rush	11	(2)
2022	Central Valley Fuego FC 2		
2023	Ventura County Fusion		
2024–	San Jose Earthquakes	27	(1)
2024–2025	San Jose Earthquakes II	12	(2)
- * Club domestic league appearances and goals as of 23 April 2026

Jamar Ricketts (born October 24, 2001) is an American professional soccer player who plays for Major League Soccer club San Jose Earthquakes.

== Early life ==
Raised in Montclair, New Jersey, Ricketts played prep soccer at St. Benedict's Preparatory School, where he graduated in 2020. Ricketts played youth soccer with the Cedar Stars Academy.

== College career ==
In 2020, he began attending California State University, Northridge, where he played for the men's soccer team. The 2020 season was cancelled due to the COVID-19 pandemic, so he began playing in the fall of 2021. At the end of the 2021 season, he was named to the Big West Conference All-Freshman Team. In 2022, Ricketts was named to the All-Big West First Team and the All-Far West Region Second Team. Ahead of the 2023 season, he was named to the All-Preseason Team and was named an NCAA Player to Watch. In September 2023, he was named the Big West Offensive Player of the Week. On October 18, 2023, he scored a brace in a 2–1 victory over the UC San Diego Tritons. At the end of the season, he was again named to the All-Big West First Team and the All-Far West Region Second Team. He was also invited to participate in the 2023 Adidas MLS College Showcase. He became the school's second-highest drafted player in school history, upon his selection in the 2024 MLS SuperDraft.

== Club career ==
In 2021, Ricketts played with the Cedar Stars Rush in USL League Two. In 2022, he played with the Central Valley Fuego FC 2. In 2023, he played with the Ventura County Fusion.

At the 2024 MLS SuperDraft, Ricketts was selected in the first round (13th overall) by the San Jose Earthquakes. In February 2024, he signed a one-year contract with options for 2025 through 2027 with the club. He scored his first professional goal, while playing with their MLS Next Pro affiliate San Jose Earthquakes II (then named The Town FC), in a playoff loss to St. Louis City SC 2 on October 27, 2024. He scored his first MLS goal on February 22, 2025, in a 4-0 victory over Real Salt Lake.

== Career statistics ==
As of match played 23 April 2026

Appearances and goals by club, season and competition
Club	Season	League			Playoffs		National cup		Other		Total	
Club	Season	Division	Apps	Goals	Apps	Goals	Apps	Goals	Apps	Goals	Apps	Goals
Cedar Stars Rush	2021	USL League Two	11	2	0	0	—		—		11	2
San Jose Earthquakes	2024	Major League Soccer	1	0	—		1	0	0	0	2	0
San Jose Earthquakes	2025	Major League Soccer	19	1	—		2	0	0	0	21	1
San Jose Earthquakes	2026	Major League Soccer	7	0	—		0	0	0	0	7	0
San Jose Earthquakes	Total		27	1	0	0	3	0	0	0	30	1
San Jose Earthquakes II	2024	MLS Next Pro	5	0	2	1	—		—		7	1
San Jose Earthquakes II	2025	MLS Next Pro	7	2	1	0	—		—		7	2
Career total			50	5	3	1	1	0	0	0	55	6
