= Aidan Stokes =

American soccer player (born 2008)

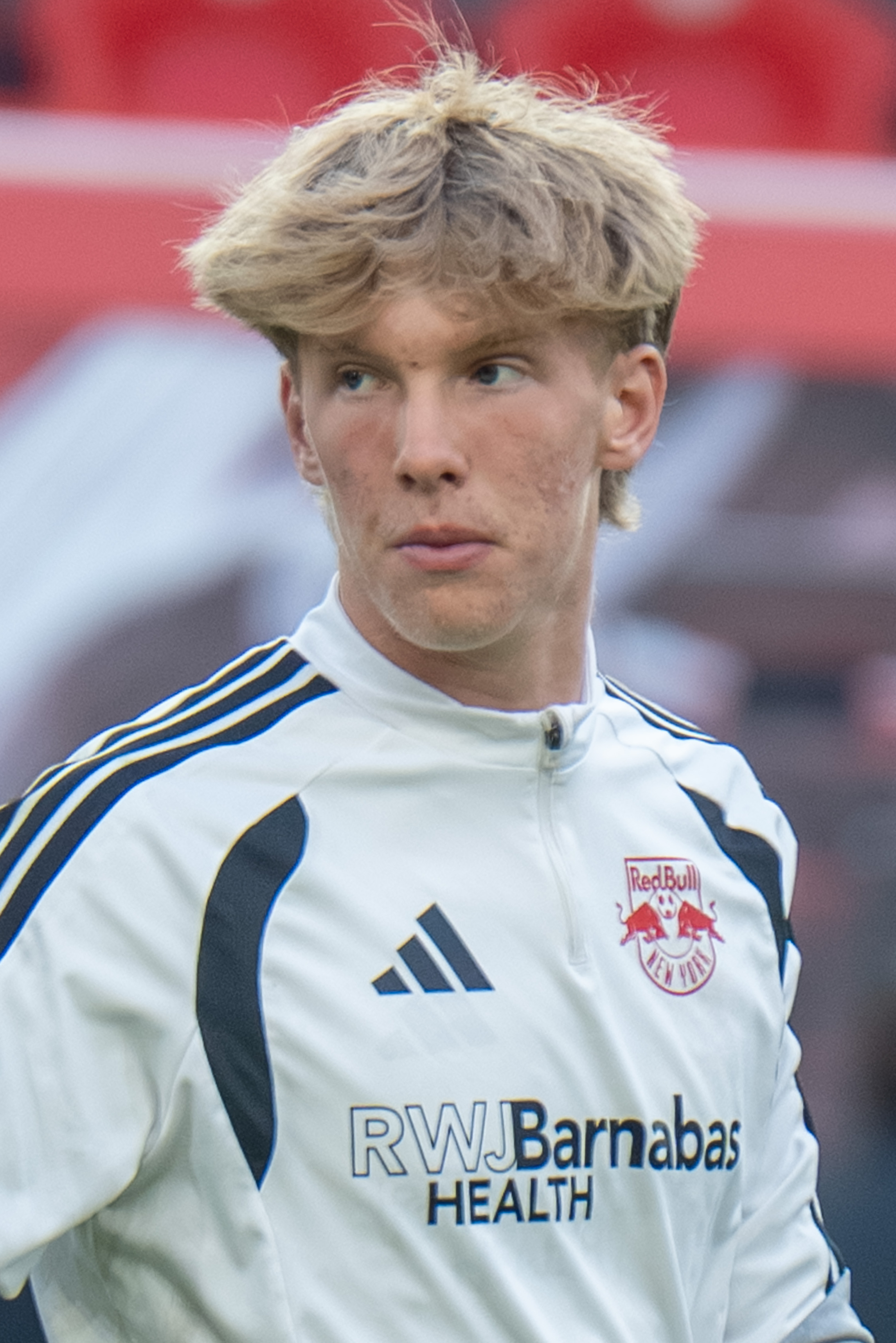
- Stokes with the New York Red Bulls in 2026

Personal information
- Full name: Aidan Nicholas Stokes
- Date of birth: January 14, 2008 (age 18)
- Place of birth: Totowa, New Jersey, United States
- Height: 1.83 m (6 ft 0 in)
- Position: Goalkeeper

Team information
- Current team: Brentford (on loan from New York Red Bulls)

Youth career
- New York Red Bulls

Senior career*
Years	Team	Apps	(Gls)
2023–	New York Red Bulls II	41	(0)
2024–	New York Red Bulls	0	(0)
2026–	→ Brentford (loan)	0	(0)

International career^{‡}
2023	United States U15	2	(0)
2023	Wales U16	5	(0)
2024	England U17	1	(0)
2024–	United States U17	6	(0)
- * Club domestic league appearances and goals as of October 24, 2025 ‡ National team caps and goals as of October 24, 2025

Aidan Nicholas Stokes (born January 14, 2008) is an American professional soccer player who plays as a goalkeeper for Premier League club Brentford, on loan from Major League Soccer club New York Red Bulls. and MLS Next Pro side New York Red Bulls II. He is currently representing the United States at youth level, having previously played for Wales and England.

== Club career ==
=== New York Red Bulls ===
Raised in Totowa, New Jersey, Stokes attended Passaic Valley Regional High School. He joined the New York Red Bulls Academy and featured within Red Bulls Academy from the U-15 level up to U-17 level. On April 19, 2023, Stokes signed an MLS NEXT Pro contract for the 2023 season, joining the first team on an MLS contract for 2024 through the 2027 MLS season, with an option for 2028.

On March 20, 2024, Stokes made his professional debut, appearing as a starter for New York Red Bulls II in a 5–1 victory over Hudson Valley Hammers in the first round of the U.S. Open Cup.

=== Brentford ===
On July 28, 2026, Stokes was loaned to Premier League club Brentford, until the end of the season.

== International career ==
Stokes is eligible to represent the United States having been born and raised in that country and also qualifies to represent both England and Wales through ancestry. During March 2023, Stokes was called in to the United States Youth National Team U-15 camp, and made one appearance with the side.

During November 2023, Stokes was selected to represent the U-16 Wales Youth National Team for the Victory Shield Tournament in Wales. He went on to make two appearances for Wales during the tournament.

In September 2024, he made his debut for United States U17 in a 1–0 loss to Germany U18.

On November 8, 2024, he was called up to the England U17 squad for the first time. On November 18, he made his debut, playing in a 2–1 loss to Belgium.

== Career statistics ==
As of match played October 19, 2025

Appearances and goals by club, season and competition
Club	Season	League			National cup		League cup		Continental		Other		Total	
Club	Season	Division	Apps	Goals	Apps	Goals	Apps	Goals	Apps	Goals	Apps	Goals	Apps	Goals
New York Red Bulls II	2023	MLS Next Pro	0	0	0	0	—		—		0	0	0	0
New York Red Bulls II	2024	MLS Next Pro	18	0	0	0	—		—		0	0	18	0
New York Red Bulls II	2025	MLS Next Pro	23	0	0	0	—		—		1 (Note: Appearance in MLS Next Pro playoffs)	0	24	0
Brentford (loan)	2026–27	Premier League	0	0	0	0	0	0	—		—		0	0
Career total			41	0	0	0	0	0	0	0	1	0	42	0

== Honors ==
New York Red Bulls II

- MLS NEXT Pro: 2025
