= Mykhi Joyner =

American soccer player (born 2006)

Personal information
- Date of birth: August 30, 2006 (age 20)
- Place of birth: Bloomington, Illinois, United States
- Position: Winger

Team information
- Current team: St. Louis City SC
- Number: 59

Youth career
- Central Illinois United
- St. Louis City SC

Senior career*
Years	Team	Apps	(Gls)
2022–	St. Louis City 2	77	(38)
2024–	St. Louis City SC	19	(1)

International career^{‡}
2024–2025	United States U19	3	(2)
2025–	United States U20	3	(0)
2025–	United States U23	1	(0)
- * Club domestic league appearances and goals as of 30 September 2026 ‡ National team caps and goals as of 8 June 2026

Mykhi Joyner (born 30 August 2006) is an American professional soccer player who plays as a winger for St. Louis City SC.

== Early life ==
Joyner was born on 30 August 2006. Born in Bloomington, Illinois, United States, he is a native of the city. The son of Rhonda, he has three older brothers.

Growing up, he started playing soccer at the age of five and attended Liberty High School in the United States.

== Club career ==
As a youth player, Joyner joined the youth academy of Central Illinois United. Following his stint here, he joined the youth academy of St. Louis City SC and was promoted to the club's reserve team in 2022.

On 30 August 2025, he scored his first goal for their senior team during a 2–3 home loss to Houston Dynamo FC in the league. During the 2025 season, he was the fourth top scorer of the 2025 MLS Next Pro with fifteen goals.

== International career ==
Joyner is a United States youth international and has represented the country at under-19 level, under-20 and under-23 level. Altogether, he made three appearances and scored two goals while playing for the United States men's national under-19 soccer team.

On 7 September 2025, he debuted for the United States men's national under-20 soccer team during a 0–0 away friendly draw with the Morocco national under-20 football team. On 17 November 2025, he debuted for the United States men's national under-23 soccer team during a 0–1 away friendly loss to the Serbia national under-21 football team.
