= Roald Mitchell =

Trinidadian footballer (born 2003)

Personal information
- Full name: Roald Randy Mitchell
- Date of birth: January 13, 2003 (age 23)
- Place of birth: Montclair, New Jersey, US
- Height: 6 ft 2 in (1.88 m)
- Position: Forward

Team information
- Current team: Viborg (on loan from New York Red Bulls)
- Number: 29

Youth career
- 2018–2021: New York Red Bulls

College career
Years	Team	Apps	(Gls)
2021–2024	Wake Forest Demon Deacons	56	(19)

Senior career*
Years	Team	Apps	(Gls)
2021	New York Red Bulls II	10	(2)
2024–	New York Red Bulls II	29	(23)
2024–	New York Red Bulls	5	(0)
2026–	→ Viborg (loan)	2	(0)

International career^{‡}
2025–	Trinidad and Tobago	3	(0)
- * Club domestic league appearances and goals as of 22:04, 25 October 2026 (UTC) ‡ National team caps and goals as of 01:34, 3 September 2026 (UTC)

Roald Randy Mitchell (born January 13, 2003) is a footballer who plays as a forward for Danish Superliga club Viborg, on loan from Major League Soccer club New York Red Bulls. Born in the United States, he plays for the Trinidad and Tobago national team.

== Early life ==
Born in Montclair, New Jersey, Mitchell joined the youth academy at the New York Red Bulls in 2018.

== College career ==
In the fall of 2021, Mitchell attended Wake Forest University to play college soccer. In his three seasons at Wake Forest, Mitchell appeared in 56 matches and scored 19 goals.

== Club career ==
In March 2021, Mitchell was announced as part of the pre-season roster for the Red Bulls reserve side, New York Red Bulls II. He made his senior debut for the side in the USL Championship on April 30, 2021, against Hartford Athletic, coming on as a 77th-minute substitute in a 2–3 defeat. He scored his first professional goal on May 23 against the Charleston Battery during a 2–2 draw. On June 16, 2021, Mitchell helped New York to a 3–1 victory over Charlotte Independence, scoring the team's third goal of the match.

On January 14, 2024, after attending college, Mitchell returned to New York, signing a three-year first team contract. On February 25, 2024, Mitchell made his debut for New York Red Bulls, entering in the 77th-minute for Elias Manoel in the opening match of the season, a 0–0 draw against Nashville SC. Mitchell was sent on loan to MLS Next Pro side New York Red Bulls II during the 2024 season. On March 17, 2024, Mitchell scored his first goal of the season for New York Red Bulls II in a 2–0 victory over Columbus Crew 2. On April 14, 2024, Mitchell scored four goals in a 5–5 result against Chicago Fire FC II, however, he suffered a knee injury in the match that would keep him out for the remainder of the season. At the time, Mitchell was the leading scorer in MLS NEXT Pro with eight goals in five matches.

Mitchell was sent on a season-long loan to Danish club Viborg on September 2, 2026. The loan deal included an option to buy. He made his debut two days later, playing the final 11 minutes in a 2–0 loss to Lyngby in the Danish Superliga. In a Danish Cup match versus Brabrand on September 19, Mitchell played just 17 minutes before leaving the match with an injury which required surgery.

== International career ==
Mitchell was born in the United States to Trinidadian parents, and holds dual American and Trinidadian descent. He was called up to the Trinidad and Tobago national team for a set of 2026 FIFA World Cup qualification matches in November 2025.

== Career statistics ==
As of match played October 25, 2026

Appearances and goals by club, season and competition
Club	Season	League			National cup (Note: Includes U.S. Open Cup, Danish Cup)		Continental		Other		Total	
Club	Season	Division	Apps	Goals	Apps	Goals	Apps	Goals	Apps	Goals	Apps	Goals
New York Red Bulls II	2021	USL Championship	10	2	—		—		—		10	2
New York Red Bulls	2024	Major League Soccer	2	0	—		0	0	0	0	2	0
New York Red Bulls	2026	Major League Soccer	3	0	1	0	—		—		4	0
New York Red Bulls	Total		5	0	1	0	0	0	0	0	6	0
New York Red Bulls II	2024	MLS Next Pro	5	8	1	0	—		—		6	8
New York Red Bulls II	2025	MLS Next Pro	15	9	—		—		4 (Note: Appearances in MLS Next Pro playoffs)	5	15	9
New York Red Bulls II	2026	MLS Next Pro	9	6	—		—		—		9	6
New York Red Bulls II	Total		24	23	1	0	0	0	4	5	29	28
Viborg (loan)	2026–27	Danish Superliga	2	0	1	0	—		—		3	0
Career total			41	24	3	0	0	0	4	5	48	29
