= Mijahir Jiménez =

Panamanian footballer (born 2007)

Personal information
- Birth name: Mijahir Ameth Jiménez Murillo
- Date of birth: 28 March 2007 (age 19)
- Place of birth: Panama City, Panama
- Height: 1.87 m (6 ft 2 in)
- Position: Forward

Team information
- Current team: New York Red Bulls
- Number: 91

Youth career
- Plaza Amador

Senior career*
Years	Team	Apps	(Gls)
2024–2026	Plaza Amador	23	(1)
2025–2026	→ New York Red Bulls II (loan)	34	(11)
2026	→ New York Red Bulls (loan)	2	(2)
2026–	New York Red Bulls	6	(0)
2026–	→ New York Red Bulls II (loan)	2	(1)

International career^{‡}
2026–	Panama	2	(0)
- * Club domestic league appearances and goals as of 04:14, 10 November 2026 (UTC) ‡ National team caps and goals as of 23:45, 29 October 2026 (UTC)

Mijahir Ameth Jiménez Murillo (born 28 March 2007) is a Panamanian professional footballer who plays as a forward for Major League Soccer club New York Red Bulls and the Panama national team.

== Career ==
=== Plaza Amador ===
Born in Panama City, Jiménez began his career with Liga LPF club Plaza Amador. He graduated from Plaza Amador's youth setup, and made his senior debut during the 2024 season at the age of 16. He became the youngest attacking player in club history to debut in the first division. On 11 March 2024, Jiménez scored his first goal as a professional footballer, an 85th-minute winner in a 2–1 victory over Veraguas Club Deportivo.

==== Loan to New York Red Bulls II ====
On 28 April 2025, Jiménez was loaned to MLS Next Pro club New York Red Bulls II for the remainder of the 2025 season. Jiménez scored his first goal for New York Red Bulls II in his first start and second appearance on 18 May, in a 4–1 win against New England Revolution II. Jiménez scored nine goals in his first season with the reserve team, as New York Red Bulls II won the 2025 MLS Next Pro Cup final against Colorado Rapids 2 via a penalty shootout. During the shootout, Jiménez successfully converted his penalty.

On 25 July 2026, Jiménez signed a short-term agreement to make him available for the New York Red Bulls' senior team in a league match against Charlotte FC that same day. Jiménez would made his debut as a substitute as the New York Red Bulls lost 2–0. A few days later, on 1 August 2025, Jiménez scored a brace in his first start for the New York Red Bulls in a 3–2 victory over Orlando City. With his goals, Jiménez became the second player to score two goals during their first start for the club since Cornell Glen in 2004, and the first player in club history to score a brace while having previously been or actively on an MLS Next Pro contract. For Jiménez's performance during his first start, he was named by Major League Soccer to the Team of the Matchday.

=== New York Red Bulls ===
The New York Red Bulls exercised Jiménez's contract option, signing him for an undisclosed fee on a two-year contract with team options for the following four seasons.

== International career ==
On 17 September 2026, Jiménez was selected by Thomas Christiansen for the Panama national team for a friendly against India on 25 September and for the 2026 Kirin Cup Soccer tournament in which Panama would face New Zealand and Japan or Ecuador from 1 October to 5 October. Jiménez started against India, marking his senior international debut, as Panama and India drew 1–1.

== Career statistics ==
=== Club ===
As of match played 7 November 2026

Appearances and goals by club, season and competition
Club	Season	League			Continental		Other		Total	
Club	Season	Division	Apps	Goals	Apps	Goals	Apps	Goals	Apps	Goals
Plaza Amador	2024	Liga LPF	21	1	—		—		21	1
Plaza Amador	2025	Liga LPF	2	0	—		—		2	0
Plaza Amador	Total		23	1	0	0	0	0	23	1
New York Red Bulls II (loan)	2025	MLS Next Pro	18	8	—		4 (Note: Appearances in MLS Next Pro playoffs)	1	22	9
New York Red Bulls II (loan)	2026	MLS Next Pro	15	3	—		—		15	3
New York Red Bulls II (loan)	Total		34	11	0	0	4	1	37	12
New York Red Bulls (loan)	2026	Major League Soccer	2	2	—		—		2	2
New York Red Bulls	2026	Major League Soccer	6	0	—		—		6	0
New York Red Bulls	New York Red Bulls total		8	2	0	0	0	0	8	2
New York Red Bulls II (loan)	2026	MLS Next Pro	2	1	—		1 (Note: Appearances in MLS Next Pro playoffs)	0	3	1
Career total			66	15	0	0	5	1	71	16

=== International ===
As of match played 1 October 2026

Appearances and goals by national team and year
National team	Year	Apps	Goals
Panama	2026	2	0
Total		2	0

== Honours ==
New York Red Bulls II

- MLS Next Pro Cup: 2025
