= Matthew Dos Santos =

American footballer (born 2008)

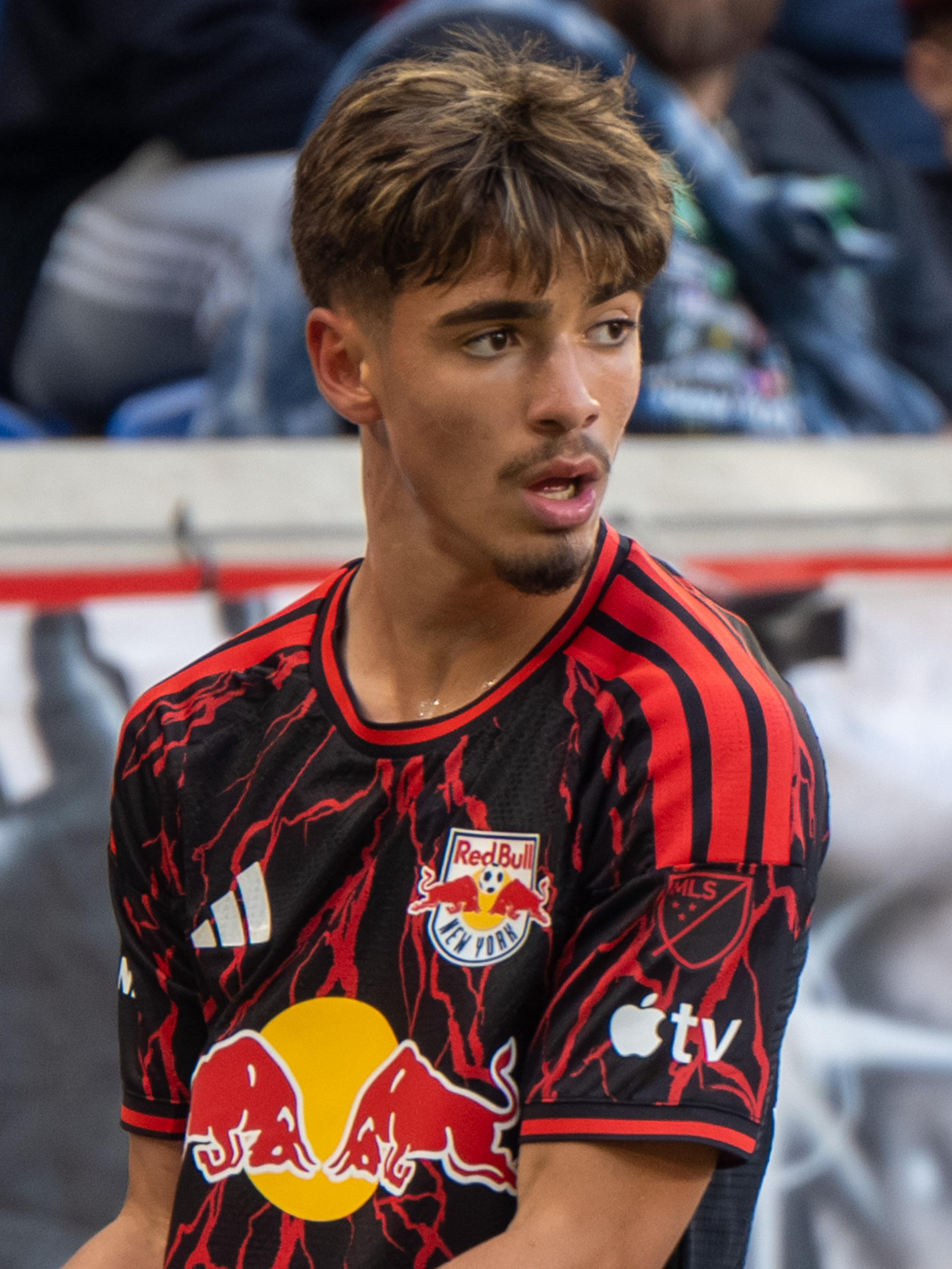
- Dos Santos with the New York Red Bulls in 2026

Personal information
- Full name: Matthew Henrique Melo Dos Santos
- Date of birth: June 5, 2008 (age 18)
- Place of birth: Sandy Hook, Connecticut, United States
- Height: 1.76 m (5 ft 9 in)
- Position: Left-back

Team information
- Current team: New York Red Bulls
- Number: 56

Youth career
- 2017–2024: New York Red Bulls

Senior career*
Years	Team	Apps	(Gls)
2024–2026	New York Red Bulls II	26	(3)
2026–	New York Red Bulls	27	(0)
- * Club domestic league appearances and goals as of November 10, 2026

Matthew Dos Santos (born June 5, 2008) is an American professional soccer player who plays as a left-back for Major League Soccer club New York Red Bulls.

== Club career ==
=== Early career ===
Born in Sandy Hook, Connecticut, Dos Santos began his time in New York in 2017, playing for the New York Red Bulls Pre-Academy team, later moving up the ranks into the U-12 Academy group. He was also a member of the 2023 U-15 MLS NEXT Cup championship winning team.

=== New York Red Bulls II ===
Dos Santos joined New York Red Bulls II in 2024 via an academy agreement. He made his MLS NEXT Pro debut on 14 June 2024, against New England Revolution II. On March 7, 2025, Dos Santos made his first appearance as a starter for New York Red Bulls II in a 1–0 victory over Atlanta United 2.

On March 12, 2025, Dos Santos signed an MLS NEXT Pro contract for the 2025 and 2026 seasons. As part of the contract, Dos Santos will join the first team on a Major League Soccer contract as a homegrown starting in 2027 through the 2029 MLS season with an option in 2030. On April 6, 2025, Dos Santos scored his first goal as a professional, converting a free kick in a 3–2 victory over Chicago Fire FC II.

=== New York Red Bulls ===
Dos Santos joined the first team to start the 2026 season. He made his MLS debut on February 21, 2026, appearing as a starter in New York’s 2-1 road win over Orlando City SC. The following week he once again started in a home victory over New England Revolution, assisting Julian Hall on the game-winning goal in the 1-0 victory. A few days later, on March 6, 2026 it was announced that Dos Santos was signed to a first team contract.

== Personal life ==
Dos Santos was born in the United States and is of Brazilian descent.

== Career statistics ==
As of match played November 7, 2026

Appearances and goals by club, season and competition
Club	Season	League			U.S. Open Cup		Continental		Other		Total	
Club	Season	Division	Apps	Goals	Apps	Goals	Apps	Goals	Apps	Goals	Apps	Goals
New York Red Bulls II	2024	MLS Next Pro	5	0	—		—		0	0	5	0
New York Red Bulls II	2025	MLS Next Pro	21	3	—		—		4 (Note: Appearances in MLS Next Pro play-offs)	0	25	3
New York Red Bulls II	Total		26	3	—		—		4	0	30	3
New York Red Bulls	2026	MLS	27	0	2	0	—		—		29	0
Career total			53	3	2	0	0	0	4	0	59	3
