= Nehuén Benedetti =

Argentine footballer (born 2005)

Personal information
- Full name: Nehuén Benedetti
- Date of birth: 25 February 2005 (age 21)
- Place of birth: Bosques, Argentina
- Height: 1.75 m (5 ft 9 in)
- Position: Midfielder

Team information
- Current team: New York Red Bulls
- Number: 39

Youth career
- 2014–2015: Defensa y Justicia
- 2015–2023: Estudiantes de La Plata

Senior career*
Years	Team	Apps	(Gls)
2023–2025	Estudiantes de La Plata	5	(0)
2025	→ New York Red Bulls II (loan)	23	(11)
2026–	New York Red Bulls	6	(0)
2026–	New York Red Bulls II	8	(0)

International career^{‡}
2024	Argentina U20	3	(0)
- * Club domestic league appearances and goals as of 20:10, 15 November 2026 (UTC) ‡ National team caps and goals as of 14:53, 9 November 2025 (UTC)

Nehuén Benedetti (born 25 February 2005) is an Argentine professional footballer who plays as a midfielder for Major League Soccer side New York Red Bulls.

== Career ==
=== Estudiantes de La Plata ===
From Bosques, Benedetti joined Estudiantes de La Plata at the end of 2015 after a successful trial, after playing for Bosques Norte and Defensa y Justicia. He spent his time at the club's Infantiles and Juveniles. In July 2023 he signed his first contract as a professional player.

He made his debut on 10 November 2023 against Central Córdoba in a 0–1 victory in the province of Santiago del Estero, coming on as a second-half substitute for Benjamín Rollheiser.

=== New York Red Bulls ===
In February 2025, Benedetti was transferred to the New York Red Bulls of Major League Soccer in the United States. This transfer was made on a loan basis with an option to buy. Benedetti was assigned to reserve side New York Red Bulls II and on 6 April, made his debut for the side in a 3–2 victory over Chicago Fire FC II. On 27 May 2025, Benedetti scored his first goal with New York Red Bulls II in a 4–2 victory over Orlando City B.

== International ==
On 1 March 2024, Benedetti was called up to the first list of the new 2024–25 cycle of the Argentina U20 national team by Javier Mascherano.

In July 2024, the coach of the Argentina U-20 team, Diego Placente, selected Benedetti for the COTIF Tournament, the international competition in L'Alcudia.

== Career statistics ==
As of match played 13 September 2026

Appearances and goals by club, season and competition
Club	Season	League			National cup (Note: Includes Copa de la Liga Profesional, U.S. Open Cup)		Continental		Other		Total	
Club	Season	Division	Apps	Goals	Apps	Goals	Apps	Goals	Apps	Goals	Apps	Goals
Estudiantes de La Plata	2023	Primera División de Argentina	0	0	1	0	0	0	0	0	1	0
Estudiantes de La Plata	2024	Primera División de Argentina	3	0	1	0	0	0	0	0	4	0
Estudiantes de La Plata	Total		3	0	2	0	0	0	0	0	5	0
New York Red Bulls II (loan)	2025	MLS Next Pro	23	11	—		—		4 (Note: Appearances in MLS Next Pro play-offs)	2	27	13
New York Red Bulls (loan)	2025	Major League Soccer	0	0	0	0	—		1 (Note: Appearance in Leagues Cup)	0	1	0
New York Red Bulls	2026	Major League Soccer	6	0	2	0	—		—		8	0
New York Red Bulls	NYRB total		6	0	2	0	—		1	0	9	0
New York Red Bulls II	2026	MLS Next Pro	8	0	—		—		0	0	8	0
Career total			42	11	2	0	0	0	5	2	49	13

== Honours ==
Estudiantes

- Copa de la Liga Profesional: 2024
- Trofeo de Campeones de la Liga Profesional: 2024

New York Red Bulls II

- MLS Next Pro Cup: 2025
- MLS Next Pro Eastern Conference (Playoffs): 2025
- MLS Next Pro Eastern Conference (Regular Season): 2025
- MLS Next Pro Northeast Division: 2025

Individual

- 2025 MLS NEXT Pro Best XI
