= Francesco Montali =

American soccer player (born 2000)

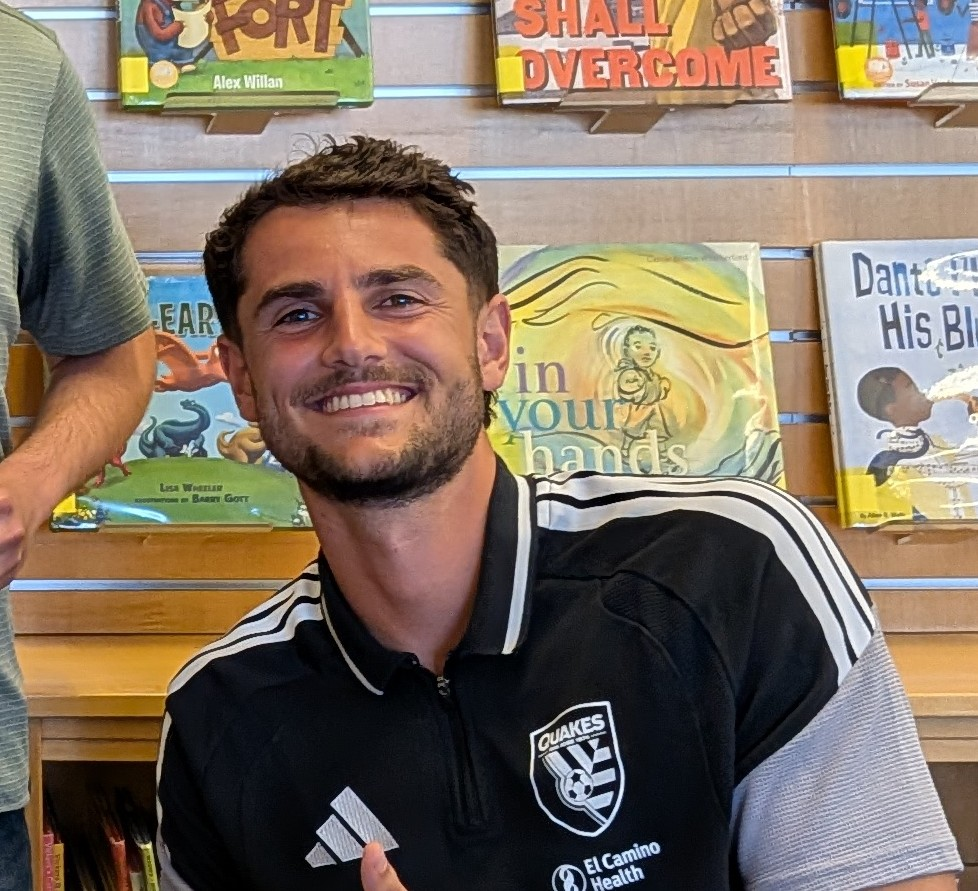
- Montali at a community event in 2026

Personal information
- Date of birth: September 6, 2000 (age 26)
- Place of birth: Miami, Florida, United States
- Height: 6 ft 3 in (1.91 m)
- Position: Goalkeeper

Team information
- Current team: San Jose Earthquakes
- Number: 31

Youth career
- New York Red Bulls Academy
- Orlando City Academy

College career
| Years | Team | Apps | (Gls) |
| 2019 | FIU Panthers | 0 | (0) |
| 2021–2023 | Boston University Terriers | 47 | (0) |

Senior career*
| Years | Team | Apps | (Gls) |
| 2024 | Vermont Green FC | 5 | (0) |
| 2024 | Minnesota United FC | 0 | (0) |
| 2024 | Minnesota United FC 2 | 5 | (0) |
| 2025– | San Jose Earthquakes | 0 | (0) |
| 2025– | San Jose Earthquakes II | 23 | (0) |
- * Club domestic league appearances and goals as of 08:06, 14 August 2026 (UTC)

Francesco Montali (born September 6, 2000) is an American professional soccer player who plays for Major League Soccer club San Jose Earthquakes.

== Early life ==
Francesco Montali was born in Miami and raised in Davie, Florida. He attended St. Thomas Aquinas High School. During his youth, he played for the Davie Sharks of the USL Youth league as well as the New York Red Bulls Academy and Orlando City Academy.

== College career ==
Montali joined the men's soccer team at Florida International University in 2019, but he did see any play action there. He later transferred to Boston University, where he played for their men's soccer team from 2021 to 2023. During his three years at BU, he achieved 19 shutouts across 47 games played, ultimately recording a 0.99 goals against average (GAA) and 0.760 save percentage. He was named the Patriot League Goalkeeper of the Year in both 2022 and 2023.

== Club career ==
Montali played for Vermont Green FC, a USL League Two club, during the summer of 2024, where he played in five matches. At the 2024 MLS SuperDraft, Ricketts was selected in the third round (82nd overall) by the Philadelphia Union, but he did not sign with the club. He ultimately signed with Minnesota United FC 2, the MLS Next Pro reserve team of Minnesota United FC, for the 2024 season, where he was a starter for five matches. Due to the MLS extreme hardship rules, the Minnesota United MLS main team was also able to sign him to a short-term contract, although the Philadelphia Union retained SuperDraft Priority List rights to Montali. He sat on the bench as a substitute for two of the MNUFC main team’s matches.

In 2025, the San Jose Earthquakes signed a contract with Montali, acquiring the SuperDraft Priority List rights from the Philadelphia Union in exchange for $50,000 in General Allocation Money (GAM). During the 2025 season, Montali played as the starter for 21 regular-season matches and two playoff matches for The Town FC, the Earthquakes' MLS Next Pro reserve team. He won the MLS Next Pro Goalkeeper of the Month award for August 2025. He also sat on the bench as a substitute for five of the Earthquakes' regular-season matches.
