= Ibrahim Kasule =

Ugandan footballer (born 2004)

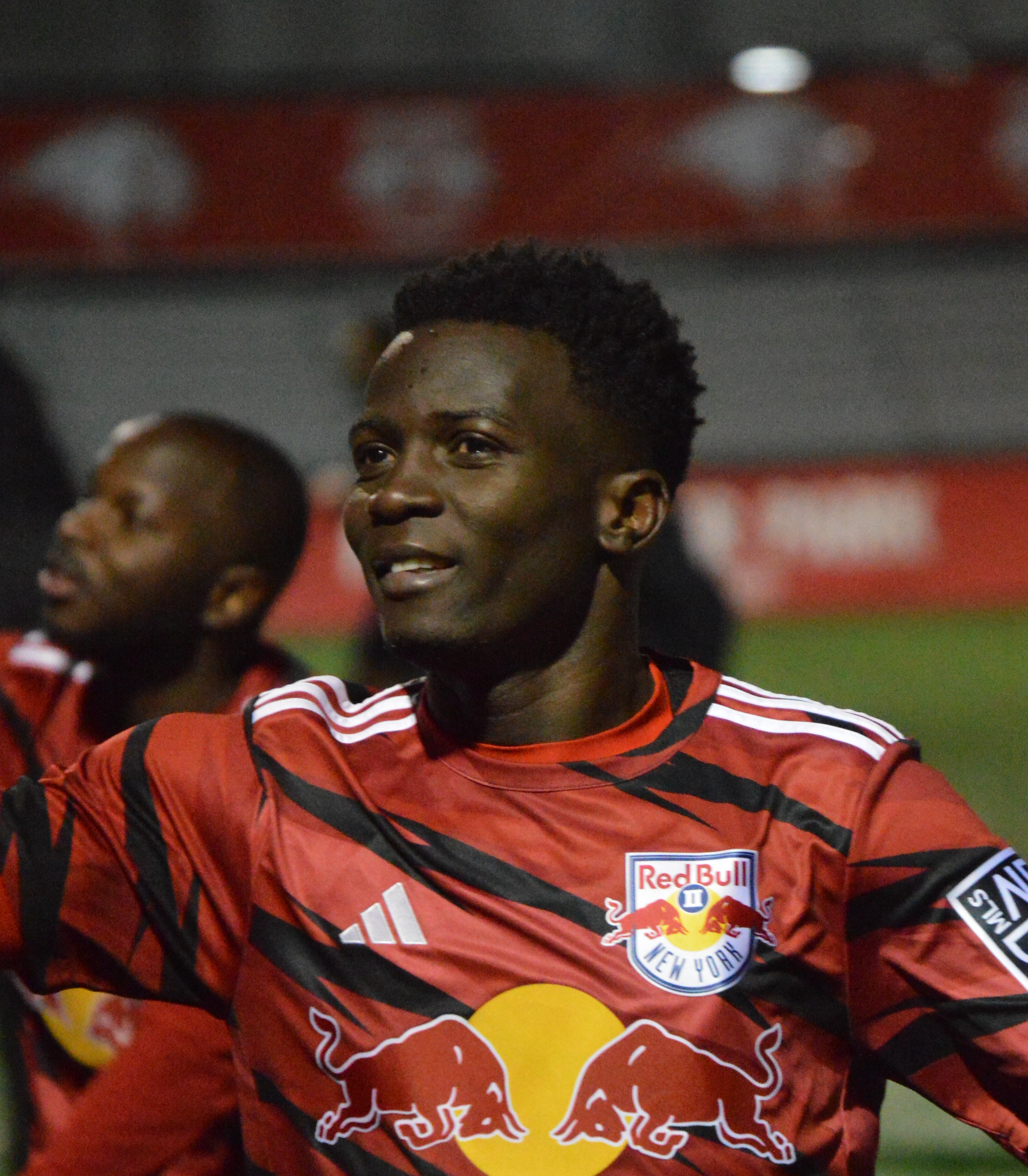
- Kasule with New York Red Bulls II in 2023

Personal information
- Full name: Ibrahim Owen Kasule
- Date of birth: 17 February 2004 (age 22)
- Place of birth: Buikwe, Uganda
- Height: 1.73 m (5 ft 8 in)
- Position: Midfielder

Team information
- Current team: KCCA
- Number: 31

Youth career
- 2020: Kampala Junior Team
- 2023: Ankara Keçiörengücü

Senior career*
Years	Team	Apps	(Gls)
2020–2023	Wakiso Giants FC	57	(7)
2023–2026	New York Red Bulls II	64	(28)
2023	New York Red Bulls	1	(0)
2026	→ CT United FC (loan)	10	(2)
2026–	KCCA	0	(0)

International career^{‡}
2023–2024	Uganda	2	(0)
- * Club domestic league appearances and goals as of 18:10, 1 August 2026 (EST) ‡ National team caps and goals as of 5 June 2025

Ibrahim Owen Kasule (born 17 February 2004) is a Ugandan professional footballer who plays as a midfielder for Uganda Premier League club KCCA.

== Club career ==
=== Early career ===
Born in Buikwe, Uganda, Kasule began his career with lower league clubs Stars Mbiko, Mbiko United, Athletico Club – Ntinda, Nansana United and Kampala Junior Team (KJT).

=== Wakiso Giants ===
In 2020, he signed with Uganda Premier League club Wakiso Giants FC. On 8 December 2020, Kasule scored his first goal for Wakiso in a 2–2 draw with Kyetume FC.

Kasule was given the squad number 10 for the 2022–23 season, and was one of the top players in Uganda scoring five goals and assisting six times during the first half of the season.

During January 2023, Kasule joined Turkish side Ankara Keçiörengücü, appearing for the club's U19 side. The move only lasted a month as he had previously signed a pre-contract with New York Red Bulls.

=== New York Red Bulls ===
On 30 March 2023, Kasule's move to New York was finalized, as he signed with MLS Next Pro side New York Red Bulls II. On 26 May 2023, Kasule scored his first goal for the club, converting a penalty kick in a 2–1 victory over Huntsville City FC. Kasule continued in fine form, and during July 2023 he was awarded the MLS Next Pro Player of the Month award. During the month, he netted five goals and had one assist in five matches. At the conclusion of his first season with New York, he was named to the league's “Best XI” for the 2023 season.

On 30 August 2023, Kasule was signed on a short-term agreement ahead of a match against the New England Revolution. Kasule would make his debut for the New York Red Bulls, coming on for Dru Yearwood in the 63rd-minute as the Red Bulls lost 1–0.

On 20 March 2024, Kasule scored his first goal of the season for New York Red Bulls II in a 5–1 victory over Hudson Valley Hammers in the first round of the U.S. Open Cup. On 6 April 2025, Kasule scored his first goal of the season in a 3–2 victory over Chicago Fire FC II. On 4 June 2025, he scored three goals in a 5–2 victory over Crown Legacy FC.

=== KCCA ===
On 7 August 2026, Kasule returned to Uganda to sign a two-year deal with top-tier side KCCA.

== International career ==
In September 2023, Kasule received his first call-up to the Uganda national team for a 2023 Africa Cup of Nations qualifying match against Niger on 7 September. However, he did not feature in the match.

== Career statistics ==
=== Club ===
As of match played 1 August 2026

Appearances and goals by club, season and competition
Club	Season	League			National cup (Note: Includes U.S. Open Cup)		Continental		Other		Total	
Club	Season	Division	Apps	Goals	Apps	Goals	Apps	Goals	Apps	Goals	Apps	Goals
Wakiso Giants FC	2020–21	Uganda Premier League	21	2	0	0	—		0	0	21	2
Wakiso Giants FC	2021–22	Uganda Premier League	22	0	0	0	—		0	0	22	0
Wakiso Giants FC	2022–23	Uganda Premier League	14	5	0	0	0	0	0	0	14	5
Wakiso Giants FC	Total		57	7	0	0	0	0	0	0	57	7
New York Red Bulls II	2023	MLS Next Pro	25	15	0	0	—		2 (Note: Appearances in MLS Next Pro play-offs)	2	27	17
New York Red Bulls II	2024	MLS Next Pro	23	7	1	1	—		0	0	24	8
New York Red Bulls II	2025	MLS Next Pro	16	6	—		—		0	0	16	6
New York Red Bulls II	Total		64	28	1	1	—		2	2	67	31
New York Red Bulls	2023	Major League Soccer	1	0	0	0	—		0	0	1	0
CT United FC (loan)	2026	MLS Next Pro	10	2	—		—		—		10	2
Career total			132	37	1	1	0	0	2	2	135	40

=== International ===
As of match played 10 June 2024

Appearances and goals by national team and year
National team	Year	Apps	Goals
Uganda
Uganda	2023	1	0
Uganda	2024	1	0
Total		2	0

== Honours ==
New York Red Bulls II

- MLS Next Pro Cup: 2025
