= New York Red Bulls II =

American soccer team

Red Bull New York II
- Nicknames: Baby Bulls; Baby Metro; Dos Toros
- Founded: January 21, 2015; 11 years ago
- Stadium: MSU Soccer Park at Pittser Field; Sports Illustrated Stadium (Select home games)
- Capacity: 5,000 (MSU Soccer Park); 25,000 (Sports Illustrated Stadium)
- Owner: Red Bull GmbH
- Sporting Director: Julian de Guzman
- Head coach: Dominik Wohlert
- League: MLS Next Pro
- 2025: 1st, Eastern Conference; Playoffs: Champions
- Website: newyorkredbulls.com/2
Home colors	Away colors

The New York Red Bulls II is an American professional soccer team based in Montclair, New Jersey. They are the reserve team of the New York Red Bulls and play in MLS Next Pro, the third tier in the American soccer pyramid.

As of 2025, Red Bulls II is the only team to ever win both the USL Championship (then known as the United Soccer League) and MLSNP championships.

== History ==
=== USL era, winning the double (2015-2022) ===
Red Bull New York II were founded on January 21, 2015, when the New York Red Bulls acquired the rights to start a USL club. Red Bulls II competes in the second tier of American soccer and serves as a reserve side for the first team as well as a developmental stage for young prospects and academy players. The club follows in the footsteps of many MLS clubs who created USL sides to help promote youth development throughout the nation.

It was announced on March 2, 2015, that former MetroStars and Red Bulls player, John Wolyniec would be the club's new head coach. Wolyniec previously served as an assistant coach to the senior team and the academy. Former Red Bulls defender, Ibrahim Sekagya will also serve on his coaching staff.

On March 19, 2015, the soccer club announced the signing of their first-ever player, and former academy standout, Tyler Adams. Following their first signing, the club's first roster consisted of senior team players who were loaned down, draft picks, academy players and local trialists. A week later, on March 28, the club played in their inaugural match, drawing 0–0 against the Rochester Rhinos. Senior team loanee, Anatole Abang scored the club's first ever goal in a 4–1 victory against Toronto FC II, marking the first victory in club history.

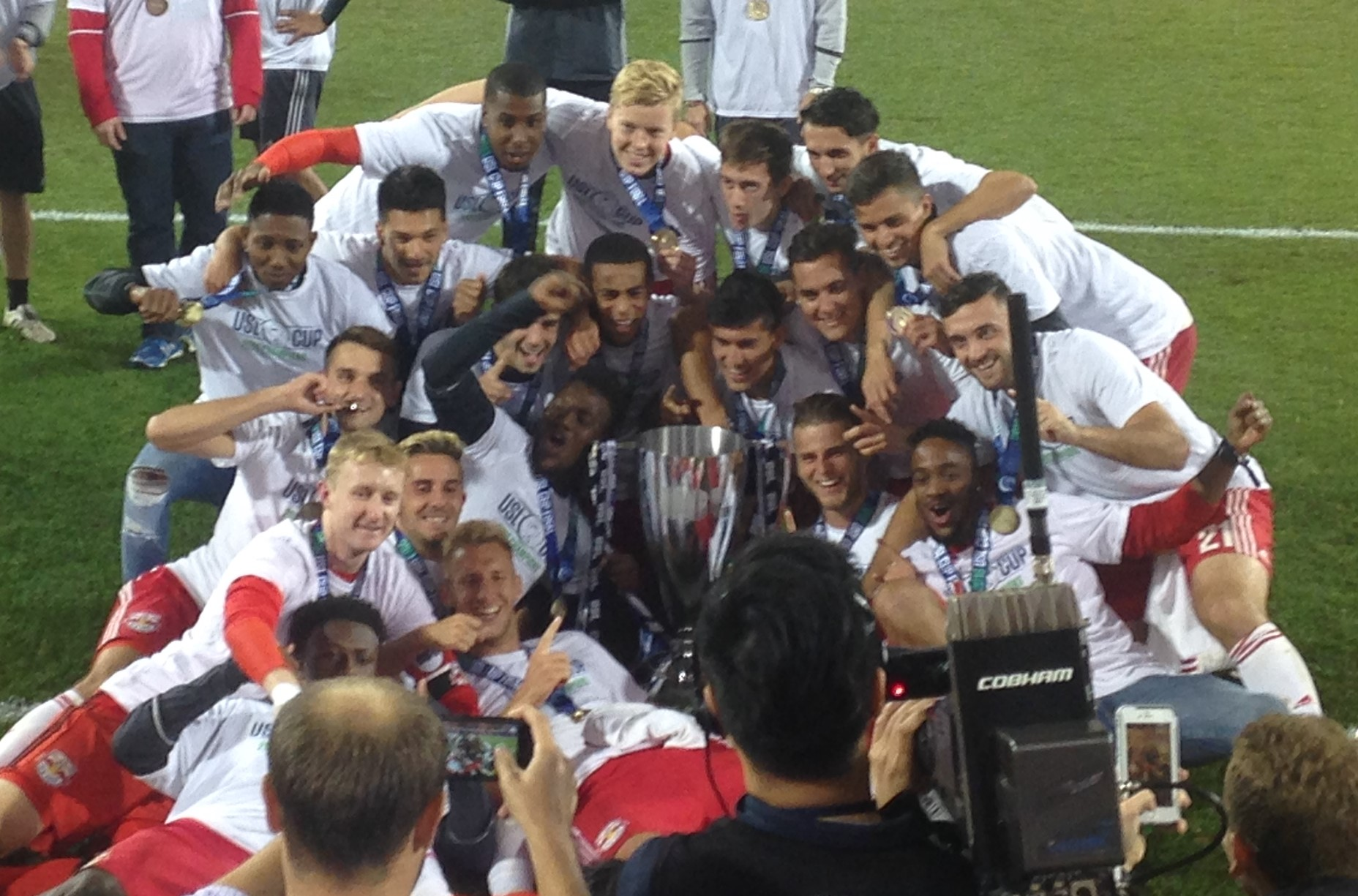
New York Red Bulls II celebrating their USL Cup victory on October 23, 2016

A New York Red Bulls team composed mostly of NYRB II players defeated Chelsea F.C. in a friendly on July 22, 2015.

After spending the majority of the 2015 and 2016 season playing at Red Bull Arena, the club announced on May 10, 2016, that their new home field would be at Montclair State University's MSU Soccer Park at Pittser Field starting in 2017.

The club won their first ever trophy on September 7, 2016, claiming the Regular Season Title (the equivalent of the Supporters' Shield) 4–1 victory at Harrisburg City Islanders. On October 23, Red Bulls II won their first USL Cup after a 5–1 victory against Swope Park Rangers at Red Bull Arena.

For the abbreviated 2020 USL Championship season, due to the global COVID-19 pandemic, Red Bulls II are playing home matches at Red Bull Arena with no fans in attendance.

On February 7, 2022, the club appointed Gary Lewis as new head coach. However, amid a dismal first season that saw the team win just three of 34 games, Lewis was fired in July. Assistant coach Ibrahim Sekagya was named interim coach.

=== MLS Next Pro era (2023-present) ===
MLS announced that it would be one of the new eight teams to join MLS Next Pro in 2023.

Sekagya, who had been with the team as an assistant since its founding in 2015, was named the full-time head coach to start the 2023 season. New York made the playoffs and advanced to the Eastern Conference Semifinals in 2023 before falling to New England Revolution II.

In 2024, they failed to make the postseason but re-established their reputation for promoting players to first team action, as Roald Mitchell, Ibrahim Kasule, AJ Marcucci, Omar Valencia and Mohammed Sofo all made their debuts for the first team in either 2024 or 2025.

After a first half of 2025 that saw the team top the overall table through their first 13 games, Sekagya was promoted to a full-time assistant coach for the first team, after doing double duty with both teams through the previous 18 months. Sekagya was replaced by former US international and ex-MetroStar Michael Bradley.

Red Bulls II finished atop both the Eastern Conference and the Northeast Division, securing the No. 1 seed in the East and placing second overall in the league table. In the postseason, New York won the Eastern Conference playoffs and then captured the 2025 MLS NEXT Pro Cup, defeating Colorado Rapids 2 on penalties after a 3–3 draw at Sports Illustrated Stadium. Following the title, Bradley signed with Red Bull New York, becoming head coach of the club's first team.

== Club culture ==
=== Supporters ===
The team-recognized, fan organized supporters group of Red Bulls II was The Rampage, founded by members of the New York Red Bulls supporters club Viking Army. The Rampage stopped operations after the Red Bulls II last home USL Championship game in September 2022 following the decision to not support the team after they moved the club to MLS Next Pro, a league dedicated for the MLS reserves teams to develop players.

== Team records ==
=== Overall records ===
As of October 27, 2024

Season	USL Championship								Play-offs	U.S. Open Cup	Top Scorer	
Season	P	W	L	D	GF	GA	Pts	Position	Play-offs	U.S. Open Cup	Player	Goals
2015	28	12	10	6	46	45	42	4th (East)	Conference Semifinals	2R	(Cameroon) Marius Obekop	6
2016	30	21	3	6	61	21	69	1st (East)*	Champions	Not eligible (MLS Reserve Team)	(United States) Brandon Allen	21
2017	32	13	14	5	57	60	44	7th (East)	Conference Finals	Not eligible (MLS Reserve Team)	(United States) Stefano Bonomo	13
2018	34	13	8	13	71	59	52	5th (East)	Conference Finals	Not eligible (MLS Reserve Team)	(El Salvador) Amando Moreno (United States) Brian White	10
2019	34	17	11	6	74	51	57	6th (East)	Conference Quarterfinals	Not eligible (MLS Reserve Team)	(United States) Jared Stroud	15
2020	16	5	11	0	30	37	15	14th (East); 3rd (Group F)	Did not qualify	Not eligible (MLS Reserve Team)	(The Gambia) Omar Sowe	7
2021	32	7	18	7	42	67	28	14th (East); 7th (Atlantic)	Did not qualify	Not eligible (MLS Reserve Team)	(The Gambia) Omar Sowe	8
2022	34	3	25	6	24	76	15	14th (East)	Did not qualify	Not eligible (MLS Reserve Team)	(United States) Jordan Adebayo-Smith	7
Season	MLS Next Pro								Play-offs	U.S. Open Cup	Top Scorer	
Season	P	W	L	D	GF	GA	Pts	Position	Play-offs	U.S. Open Cup	Player	Goals
2023	28	14	6	8	53	36	51	4th (Eastern)	Conference Semifinals	Not eligible (MLS Reserve Team)	(Uganda) Ibrahim Kasule	15
2024	28	10	6	12	56	61	40	11th (Eastern)	Did not qualify	2R	(Trinidad and Tobago) Roald Mitchell	8
2025	28	17	5	6	68	56	58	1st (Eastern)	Champions	Not eligible (MLS Reserve Team)	(Argentina) Nehuén Benedetti	11
2026	28	13	10	5	58	46	46	8th (Eastern)	Conference Quarterfinals	Not eligible (MLS Reserve Team)	(United States) Christian Gallagher	9

^{*} Regular season title winners

- As of the 2016 season, MLS reserve sides are not allowed to compete in the Lamar Hunt U.S. Open Cup.
- As of the 2024 season, New York Red Bulls were 1 of 11 clubs to play their MLS Next Pro club in the Lamar Hunt U.S. Open Cup. For the 2025 season, MLS provided new criteria for qualification to enter the Lamar Hunt U.S. Open Cup.

=== Head coach record ===
As of December 15, 2025

- Includes USL Regular season, USL Play-offs and U.S. Lamar Hunt Open Cup

Name	Nationality	From	To	P	W	L	D	Win%
John Wolyniec	United States	February 14, 2015	December 10, 2021	236	108	84	44	45.76
Gary Lewis	England	February 7, 2022	July 2, 2022	17	1	13	3	5.88
Ibrahim Sekagya	Uganda	July 2, 2022	June 16, 2025	94	47	44	3	50.00
Michael Bradley	United States	June 17, 2025	December 15, 2025	21	15	6	0	71.43

=== Player honors ===
Year	Pos	Player	Country	Honor(s)
2016	FW	Brandon Allen	United States	All-League First Team
2016	FW	Brandon Allen	United States	USL Cup MVP
2016	FW	Brandon Allen	United States	USL Rookie of the Year
2016	DF	Aaron Long	United States	USL Defender of the Year
2016	DF	Aaron Long	United States	All-League First Team
2017	MF	Vincent Bezecourt	France	All-League Second Team
2019	MF	Jared Stroud	United States	All-League First Team
2023	MF	Ibrahim Kasule	Uganda	MLS Next Pro Best XI
2025	MF	Nehuén Benedetti	Argentina	MLS Next Pro Best XI
2025	MF	Rafael Mosquera	Panama	MLS Next Pro Cup Final MVP

== Players ==
=== Roster ===
As of July 17, 2025

No.	Pos.	Nation	Player
32	DF	COL	Erick Londoño (on loan from Orsomarso S.C.)
35	MF	MTN	Abdellahi Nasser Dine
40	DF	PAN	Alexander Julio (on loan from C.D. Plaza Amador)
41	DF	JPN	Shunya Sakai (on loan from RB Omiya Ardija)
42	MF	VEN	Marco Morigi (on loan from Caracas F.C.)
52	DF	PAN	Aimar Modelo (on loan from Club Atlético Independiente)
45	DF	USA	Connor Faello
55	GK	USA	Austin Causey
56	DF	USA	Matthew Dos Santos
60	MF	MLI	Sekone Kone (on loan from Yeelen Olympique)
61	MF	USA	Deven Cadigan
62	MF	USA	Paul Sokoloff
71	DF	PAN	Aimar Sánchez (on loan from C.D. Plaza Amador)
72	GK	POL	Tobias Szewczyk
73	FW	CRC	Akheem Wilson (on loan from Deportivo Saprissa)
80	MF	USA	Nate Worth
82	MF	MLI	Makan Sissoko (on loan from Yeelen Olympique)
83	MF	USA	Benjamin Rodriguez
87	FW	USA	Christian Gallagher
91	FW	PAN	Mijahir Jiménez (on loan from C.D. Plaza Amador)
92	FW	USA	Dennis Nelich
95	FW	NGR	Malik Odeyinka
96	GK	USA	Tomas Hut
—	DF	BRA	Kevin (on loan from RB Bragantino)
—	DF	BRA	Pedro Castro (on loan from RB Bragantino)

Signed to first team contract with New York Red Bulls.
New York Red Bulls Academy player.

=== Out on loan ===
No.	Pos.	Player	Nation
31	MF	UGA	Ibrahim Kasule (at CT United FC)
65	MF	UGA	Steven Sserwadda (at CT United FC)

== Player statistics ==
=== Top appearances ===
As of June 24, 2017

#	Name	Career	USL	Playoffs	Open Cup	Total
1	(Poland) Konrad Plewa	2015–2016	47	6	1	54
1	(United States) Dan Metzger	2015–2017	49	4	1	54
2	(Haiti) Derrick Etienne	2015–2019	42	4	1	47
3	(United States) Brandon Allen	2016–2017	41	4	0	45
4	(Jamaica) Devon Williams	2015–2016	36	3	0	39
5	(United States) Stefano Bonomo	2015–2018	31	6	0	37
5	(Switzerland) Tim Schmoll	2016–2017	34	3	0	37
5	(France) Vincent Bezecourt	2016–2019	33	4	0	37

Bold signifies current Red Bulls II player

=== Top goalscorers ===
As of March 7, 2020

#	Name	Career	USL	Playoffs	Open Cup	Total
1	(United States) Brandon Allen	2016–2017	24	6	0	30
2	(United States) Jared Stroud	2018–2020	22	0	0	22
3	(United States) Stefano Bonomo	2015–2018	18	3	0	21
3	(United States) Tom Barlow	2018–2019	19	2	0	21
4	(Jamaica) Junior Flemmings	2016–2017	16	1	0	17
5	(France) Vincent Bezecourt	2016–2019	12	2	0	14
6	(France) Florian Valot	2016–2021	11	2	0	13
7	(Haiti) Derrick Etienne	2015–2017	9	2	0	11

Bold signifies current Red Bulls II player

== Honors ==
National
Competitions	Titles	Seasons	Runner-up
MLS Next Pro
MLSNP Cup (Tier 3)	1	2025	-
MLSNP Supporters' Shield	0	-	2025
MLSNP Eastern Conference (Regular Season)	1	2025	-
MLSNP Eastern Conference (Playoffs)	1	2025	-
MLSNP Northeast Division	1	2025	-
USL Championship
USLC Cup (Tier 3)	1	2016	-
USLC Players' Shield	1	2016	-
USLC Eastern Conference (Regular Season)	1	2016	-
USLC Eastern Conference (Playoffs)	1	2016	2017, 2018

== See also ==
- Soccer in New York City
- New York Red Bulls U-23
