= Gage Guerra =

American soccer player (born 2002)

Andrew Gage Guerra
Personal information
- Date of birth: December 21, 2002 (age 23)
- Place of birth: Houston, Texas, United States
- Height: 5 ft 10 in (1.78 m)
- Position: Forward

Team information
- Current team: Portland Timbers
- Number: 88

Youth career
- 2017–2020: Houston Dynamo

College career
Years	Team	Apps	(Gls)
2021–2022	Army Black Knights	33	(15)
2023–2024	Louisville Cardinals	29	(16)

Senior career*
Years	Team	Apps	(Gls)
2025–	Portland Timbers 2	19	(11)
2025–	Portland Timbers	6	(0)
- * Club domestic league appearances and goals as of November 2, 2025

Gage Guerra (born December 21, 2002) is an American professional soccer player who plays as a forward for Portland Timbers in Major League Soccer.

== Career ==
=== Early life and college ===
Guerra attended Kingwood Park High School in Houston, Texas, where he played he was a first-team all-state selection by the Texas Association of Soccer Coaches in 2021, and finished with 32 goals and 24 assists. He was also named All-Greater Houston Boys Soccer Player of the Year, and helped the team to the state final. In between stints playing with his high school side Guerra had also played with the Houston Dynamo academy.

In 2021, Guerra played college soccer at the United States Military Academy for two years, scoring 15 goals in 33 appearances, as well as tallying four assists. In 2022, he was named Patriot League Offensive Player of the Year, All-Patriot League First Team, and United Soccer Coaches All-Atlantic Region First Team. Guerra transferred to the University of Louisville in 2023, where he went on to score seven goals in 13 appearances for the Cardinals and earned a space on the MAC Hermann Trophy Watch List. On December 19, 2023, Guerra was selected 69th overall in the 2024 MLS SuperDraft by Portland Timbers, but opted to return to Louisville to complete his senior year. Guerra bagged nine goals and three assists in 16 appearances in 2024, earning him a All-ACC Third Team award.

=== Professional ===
On November 24, 2024, it was announced that Guerra would join Portland Timbers 2 for their upcoming 2025 season in the MLS Next Pro. In the first half of 2025, Guerra netted seven goals in 12 appearances, earning him a short-term loan with the Portland Timbers first team on May 17, 2025, ahead of a fixture against Seattle Sounders, and in the Lamar Hunt US Open Cup, scoring against Tacoma Defiance earlier in May. On June 26, 2025, Timbers announced that Guerra had signed a permanent deal with the club's Major League Soccer side.
