= Anderson Rosa =

Brazilian footballer

Personal information
- Full name: Anderson Indalencio da Rosa
- Date of birth: 11 March 1993 (age 33)
- Place of birth: Laguna, Brazil
- Height: 1.75 m (5 ft 9 in)
- Position: Midfielder

Team information
- Current team: ABC

Youth career
- 2009–2011: Corinthians

Senior career*
Years	Team	Apps	(Gls)
2011–2013	Corinthians		
2012	→ J. Malucelli (loan)	9	(1)
2012	→ Bragantino (loan)	1	(0)
2013	→ Avaí (loan)		
2014	Barra da Tijuca	3	(1)
2014	Flamengo-SP	7	(0)
2015	FC Cascavel	9	(1)
2015	Mogi Mirim	8	(1)
2016–2017	Capivariano	17	(2)
2016–2017	→ Beitar Jerusalem (loan)		
2017	Mogi Mirim	13	(1)
2018	Caldense	12	(2)
2018	Tombense	13	(1)
2019	Cabofriense	11	(3)
2019	ABC	17	(2)
2019–2020	São Caetano	33	(4)
2020–2021	Ferroviária	12	(2)
2021–2022	Novorizontino	27	(1)
2022	Botafogo-PB	8	(0)
2023–2025	Portuguesa-RJ	56	(7)
2024	→ Brusque (loan)	6	(1)
2025–	ABC	16	(1)
- * Club domestic league appearances and goals as of 14 October 2024

Anderson Indalencio da Rosa (born 11 March 1993), better known as Anderson Rosa, is a Brazilian professional footballer who plays as a midfielder for ABC.

== Career ==
Revealed by Corinthians' youth sectors, Anderson Rosa did not play for the main team, being loaned to other teams. Over the years he has played for more modest teams in Brazilian football, even in the 2019 season when he played for ABC and São Caetano, where he was champion of the Copa Paulista and the 2020 Série A2.

At the end of 2020, he was hired by Ferroviária, where he remained until May 2021, when he was acquired by Novorizontino.

Rosa played for Botafogo-PB in 2022, and in 2023 for Portuguesa-RJ, where he became champion of the Copa Rio. In March 2024 he was loaned to Brusque to compete in the 2024 Campeonato Brasileiro Série B, but due to a disagreement with the coach, ended up being returned.

In February 2025, Rosa returned to ABC.

== Honours ==
Corinthians

- Campeonato Paulista: 2013

São Caetano

- Copa Paulista: 2019
- Campeonato Paulista Série A2: 2020

Portuguesa-RJ

- Copa Rio: 2023
