= Seymour Reid (footballer) =

Jamaican footballer (born 2008)

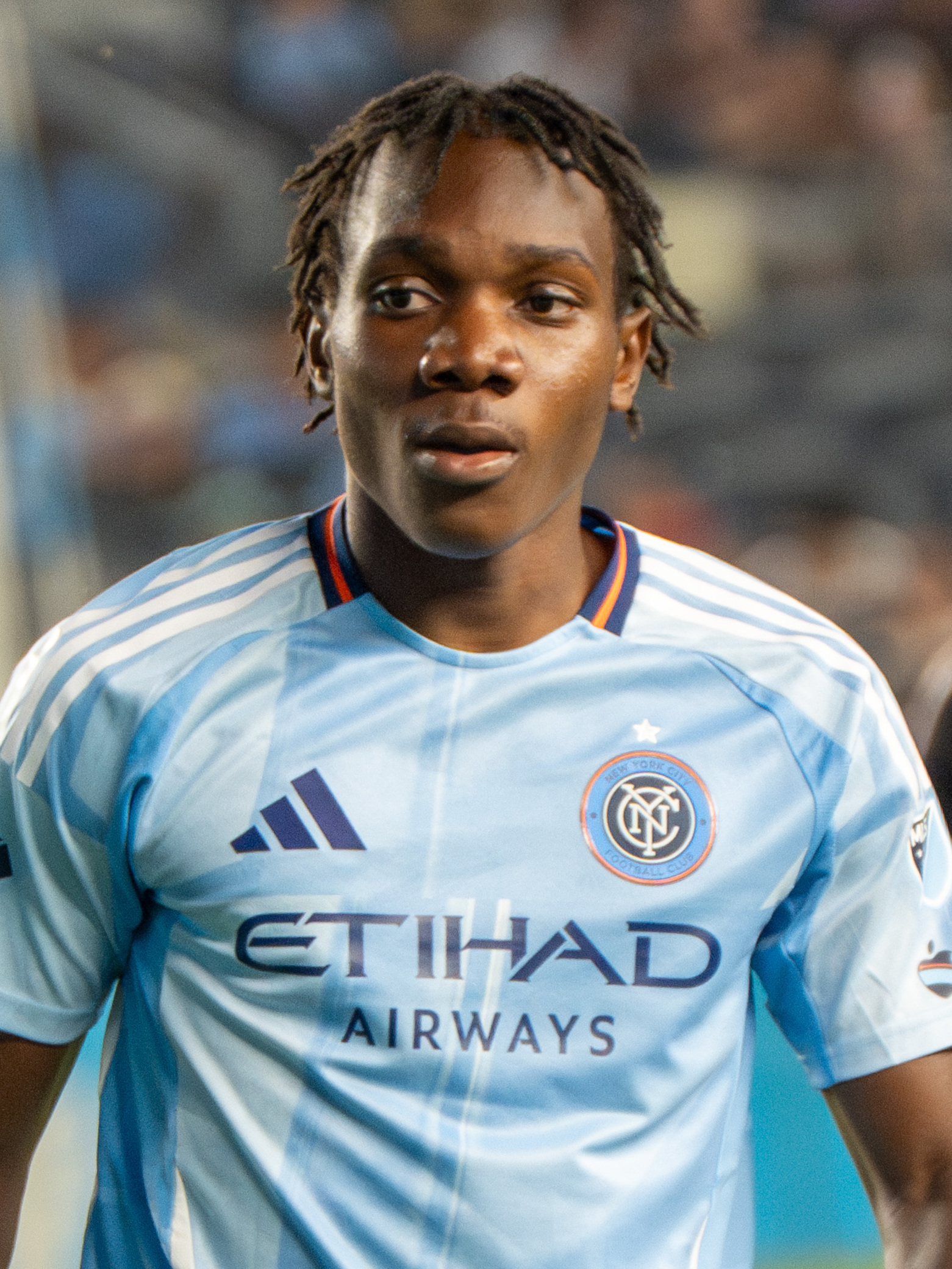
- Reid with New York City FC in 2025

Personal information
- Full name: Seymour Garfield-Reid
- Date of birth: 4 March 2008 (age 18)
- Place of birth: Kingston, Jamaica
- Height: 5 ft 11 in (1.80 m)
- Position: Forward

Team information
- Current team: Sporting Kansas City (on loan from New York City FC)
- Number: 29

Youth career
- 2024–2025: New York City FC

Senior career*
| Years | Team | Apps | (Gls) |
| 2025– | New York City FC II | 22 | (15) |
| 2025– | New York City FC | 21 | (1) |
| 2026– | → Sporting Kansas City (loan) | 2 | (0) |

International career
| 2023–2025 | Jamaica U17 | 4 | (3) |
- * Club domestic league appearances and goals as of 12 September 2026

Seymour Garfield-Reid (born 4 March 2008) is a Jamaican professional footballer who plays as a forward for Major League Soccer club Sporting Kansas City on loan from New York City FC.

== Early life and youth career ==
Reid was born in Kingston, Jamaica, his family relocated to the United States when he was 9 years old, where he played youth football for Progressive Soccer Club, then he was scouted by Cedar Stars Academy. Reid joined the New York City FC Academy in fall 2024, having moved from Cedar Stars Academy in New Jersey.

== Club career ==
=== NYCFC II ===
In March 2025, Reed signed an MLS Next Pro contract with NYCFC II through 2025, with a scheduled promotion to a First Team Homegrown contract in 2026. He scored three goals in his first two pro matches, including a brace and a game‑winner, and has totaled 7 goals in 11 appearances to date.

=== New York City FC ===
Reid earned three Short‑Term Agreements with NYCFC’s First Team, debuting as a substitute in March 2025 — the youngest player in club MLS history — in a 0–0 draw vs. Columbus Crew.

On 27 May 2025, Reid signed a Homegrown Player contract through 2029 (with option for 2030), becoming NYCFC’s 17th homegrown player and immediately eligible for first team call‑ups.

On 13 September 2025, Reid scored against Chicago Fire FC, becoming the youngest player in the history of the club to score, at 17 years old.

On 2 September 2026, Reid was loaned to fellow MLS squad Sporting Kansas City until the end of the 2027 season.

== International career ==
Reid has featured for the Jamaica U17 national team, scoring 3 goals in 4 appearances. In October 2025, Reid received his first call-up to Jamaica's senior national team.

== Style of play ==
A traditional "number nine," Reid is lauded for his physical presence, technical control, composure in front of goal, and has been praised as "a young player with a lot of qualities" by coach Matt Pilkington.

== Career statistics ==
| Club | Season | League | Apps | Goals |
|---|---|---|---|---|
| NYCFC II | 2025 | MLS Next Pro | 11 | 7 |
| New York City FC | 2025 | MLS | 3 | 0 |
