= San Jose Earthquakes II =

Soccer team

- Full name: San Jose Earthquakes II
- Founded: December 6, 2021; 4 years ago
- Stadium: PayPal Park; San Jose, California
- Capacity: 5,500
- Owner: San Jose Earthquakes
- Head coach: Dan DeGeer
- League: MLS Next Pro
- 2025: 2nd, Western Conference; Playoffs: Conference Semifinals
- Website: sjearthquakes.com/earthquakesii
Home colors	Away colors

San Jose Earthquakes II is an American professional soccer team that is located in San Jose, California. It is the reserve team of San Jose Earthquakes and participates in MLS Next Pro.

== History ==
On December 6, 2021, the San Jose Earthquakes were named as one of 21 clubs that would field a team in the new MLS Next Pro league beginning in the 2022 season.

On March 11, 2024, the Earthquakes announced that "commercial operations" of their MLS Next Pro team would be taken over by the East Bay-based The Town Group. Earthquakes II was subsequently renamed The Town FC, with the majority of home matches to be played at Saint Mary's Stadium on the campus of Saint Mary's College of California in Moraga, and three home matches in the 2024 season to be played at the team's previous home of PayPal Park in San Jose, California.

On January 20, 2026, the Earthquakes subsequently announced that after careful consideration, San Jose has decided to revive the team's original branding and bring the team's commercial operations back in-house.

Last season, San Jose’s MLS NEXT Pro team, formerly named The Town FC, enjoyed another banner year under Head Coach Dan DeGeer, who celebrated over 100 matches in charge while steering the team to the Western Conference Semifinals. In addition to securing a third consecutive berth in the MLS NEXT Pro Playoffs and back-to-back Pacific Division titles, the team amassed 14 wins and 52 points to break the 2024 team’s club records. DeGeer, who was named a finalist for Coach of the Year, will remain at the helm in 2026.

== Players and staff ==
=== Roster ===
As of 2025

No.	Pos.	Nation	Player
32	FW	NGA	Nonso Adimabua
52	MF	SCO	Julian Donnery
58	MF	USA	Gabriel Bracken
66	DF	USA	Alejandro Cano
70	FW	USA	Tomo Allen
71	DF	USA	Niklas Dossman
72	DF	USA	Ricardo Ibarra
73	DF	USA	Jacob Heisner
74	DF	USA	Martin Kwende Jr.
77	FW	USA	Jermaine Spivey
88	FW	USA	Diogo Baptista
90	MF	USA	Zach Bohane
91	GK	USA	Connor Lambe
99	FW	USA	Shane de Flores

Signed to first team contract with the San Jose Earthquakes.
San Jose Earthquakes academy player.

=== Staff ===
- Dan DeGeer – Head Coach
- Noah Delgado – Assistant Coach
- Timothy Murray – Goalkeeper Coach

== Team record ==
=== Year-by-year ===
As of September 18, 2022

Season	MLS Next Pro										Playoffs	Top Scorer	
Season	P	W	D	L	GF	GA	GD	Pts	Conf.	Overall	Playoffs	Player	Goals
2022	24	12	4	8	48	37	+11	41	5th	6th	Did not qualify	(United States) Rudi Castro	12
2023	28	11	7	10	41	36	+5	45	6th	11th	Western Conference Semifinals	(United States) Eduardo Blancas	12
2024	28	13	8	7	41	28	+13	51	3rd	5th	Western Conference Semifinals	(United States) Eduardo Blancas	8
2025	28	14	6	8	59	36	+23	52	2nd	7th	Western Conference Semifinals	(Nigeria) Nonso Adimabua	13

=== Head coaches record ===
As of September 18, 2022

Name	Nationality	From	To	P	W	D	L	GF	GA	Win%
Alex Covelo	Spain	February 9, 2022	April 18, 2022	3	1	0	2	2	2	33.33
Dan DeGeer	United States	April 18, 2022	present	21	11	4	6	46	35	52.38

== See also ==
- San Jose Earthquakes U23
- MLS Next Pro
