= 2022 New York Red Bulls season =

New York Red Bulls
2022 season
- General Manager: Marc de Grandpré
- Head coach: Gerhard Struber
- Stadium: Red Bull Arena
- Major League Soccer: 6th
- MLS Cup playoffs: First round
- U.S. Open Cup: Semi-finals
- Top goalscorer: League: Lewis Morgan (14); All: Lewis Morgan (17)
- Highest home attendance: 25,219 (July 17)
- Lowest home attendance: 13,257(May 18)
- Average home league attendance: 17,002
- Biggest win: TOR 1–4 RBNY (Mar. 5); DC 0–3 RBNY (May 10, OC); RBNY 4–1 DC (May 28)
- Biggest defeat: ORL 5-1 RBNY (July 27, OC)
Home colors	Secondary colors

The 2022 New York Red Bulls season was the club's twenty-seventh season in Major League Soccer, the top division of soccer in the United States.

Due to the 2022 FIFA World Cup, the regular season began early on February 26, 2022, and ended on October 9. The team ended their season on October 15, 2022, after losing to FC Cincinnati 1–2 in the MLS Cup Playoffs.

== Team information ==
=== Squad information ===
As of October 15, 2022

Appearances and goals are career totals from all-competitions.

Squad No.	Name	Nationality	Position(s)	Date of birth (age)	Signed from	Games played	Goals scored
Goalkeepers
1	Carlos Coronel	(Brazil)	GK	December 29, 1996 (age 29)	(Austria) Red Bull Salzburg	71	0
18	Ryan Meara	(United States)	GK	November 15, 1990 (age 35)	(United States) Fordham University	57	0
40	AJ Marcucci	(United States)	GK	August 31, 1999 (age 26)	(United States) New York Red Bulls II	0	0
Defenders
4	Andrés Reyes	(Colombia)	CB	August 9, 1999 (age 26)	(Colombia) Atlético Nacional	33	2
6	Kyle Duncan	(United States)	RB	August 8, 1997 (age 28)	(Belgium) Oostende (on loan)	86	5
12	Dylan Nealis	(United States)	RB	July 30, 1998 (age 27)	(United States) Nashville SC	34	1
15	Sean Nealis	(United States)	CB	January 13, 1997 (age 29)	(United States) Hofstra University	83	2
33	Aaron Long	(United States)	CB	October 12, 1992 (age 33)	(United States) New York Red Bulls II	175	14
47	John Tolkin	(United States)	LB	July 31, 2002 (age 23)	Academy	65	3
98	Hassan Ndam	(United States)	CB	October 29, 1998 (age 27)	(United States) New York Red Bulls II	5	0
Midfielders
8	Frankie Amaya	(United States)	CM	September 26, 2000 (age 25)	(United States) FC Cincinnati	51	2
10	Lewis Morgan	(Scotland)	RW/LW	September 30, 1996 (age 29)	(United States) Inter Miami CF	37	18
16	Dru Yearwood	(England)	CM	February 17, 2000 (age 26)	(England) Brentford	70	3
17	Cameron Harper	(United States)	RW/LW	November 19, 2001 (age 24)	(Scotland) Celtic	26	2
19	Wikelman Carmona	(Venezuela)	CM	February 24, 2003 (age 23)	(Venezuela) Academia Dynamo FC	26	1
21	Omir Fernandez	(United States)	RW/LW	February 8, 1999 (age 27)	Academy	91	11
22	Serge Ngoma	(United States)	CM	July 9, 2005 (age 20)	Academy	6	2
23	Cristian Cásseres Jr.	(Venezuela)	CM	January 20, 2000 (age 26)	(Venezuela) Deportivo La Guaira	106	14
30	Jesús Castellano	(Venezuela)	CM	March 22, 2004 (age 22)	(Venezuela) Yaracuyanos	1	0
37	Caden Clark	(United States)	CM	May 27, 2003 (age 23)	(Germany) RB Leipzig (on loan)	50	8
65	Steven Sserwadda	(Uganda)	CM	August 28, 2002 (age 23)	(United States) New York Red Bulls II	3	0
75	Daniel Edelman	(United States)	CM	April 28, 2003 (age 23)	Academy	19	1
82	Luquinhas	(Brazil)	RW/LW	September 28, 1996 (age 29)	(Poland) Legia Warsaw	36	7
91	Bento Estrela	(United States)	CM	February 10, 2006 (age 20)	Academy	0	0
Forwards
9	Patryk Klimala	(Poland)	FW	August 5, 1998 (age 27)	(Scotland) Celtic	61	14
11	Elias Manoel	(Brazil)	FW	November 30, 2001 (age 24)	(Brazil) Grêmio (on loan)	7	2
28	Zach Ryan	(United States)	FW	January 14, 1999 (age 27)	Academy	7	1
74	Tom Barlow	(United States)	FW	July 8, 1995 (age 30)	(United States) New York Red Bulls II	96	14

== Roster transactions ==
=== In ===
#	Pos.	Player	Signed from	Details	Date	Source
1	GK	(Brazil) Carlos Coronel	(Austria) Red Bull Salzburg	Signed permanently from loan	December 6, 2021	
10	MF	(Scotland) Lewis Morgan	(United States) Inter Miami CF	$1,200,000	December 12, 2021	
12	DF	(United States) Dylan Nealis	(United States) Nashville SC	$125,000	December 12, 2021	
75	MF	(United States) Daniel Edelman	Academy	Homegrown Player	December 17, 2021	
28	FW	(United States) Zach Ryan	Academy	Homegrown Player	January 20, 2022	
30	MF	(Venezuela) Jesús Castellano	(Venezuela) Yaracuyanos	Undisclosed transfer	January 20, 2022	
64	FW	(United States) Jake LaCava	(United States) New York Red Bulls II	Free transfer	January 20, 2022	
37	CM	(United States) Caden Clark	(Germany) RB Leipzig	Loan until December 2022	February 9, 2022	
82	CM	(Brazil) Luquinhas	(Poland) Legia Warsaw	Undisclosed transfer	February 16, 2022	
7	RB	(England) Tom Edwards	(England) Stoke City	Loan until December 2022	February 17, 2022	
22	MF	(United States) Serge Ngoma	Academy	Homegrown Player	February 17, 2022	
11	FW	(England) Ashley Fletcher	(England) Watford	Loan until July 2022	February 28, 2022	
6	DF	(United States) Kyle Duncan	(Belgium) Oostende	Loan until December 2022	August 5, 2022	
11	FW	(Brazil) Elias Manoel	(Brazil) Grêmio	Loan until December 2022	August 6, 2022	
13	MF	(Canada) Tyler Pasher	(United States) Houston Dynamo	Waivers	August 10, 2022	
98	DR	(Cameroon) Hassan Ndam	(United States) New York Red Bulls II	Free transfer	September 3, 2022	

=== Out ===
#	Pos.	Player	Signed by	Details	Date	Source
88	GK	(United States) Luca Lewis	(Italy) Cesena	Option declined	December 1, 2021	
20	DF	(France) Issiar Dramé	(Ukraine) Lviv	Option declined	December 1, 2021	
39	DF	(England) Mandela Egbo	(England) Swindon Town	Option declined	December 1, 2021	
77	MF	(Austria) Daniel Royer	Free agent	Option declined	December 1, 2021	
25	FW	(Denmark) Mathias Jørgensen	(Denmark) Esbjerg	Option declined	December 1, 2021	
6	DF	(United States) Kyle Duncan	(Belgium) Oostende	End of Contract	December 1, 2021	
27	MF	(United States) Sean Davis	(United States) Nashville SC	End of contract	December 1, 2021	
5	DF	(United States) Andrew Gutman	(United States) Atlanta United FC	End of loan	December 1, 2021	
7	DF	(England) Tom Edwards	(England) Stoke City	End of loan	December 1, 2021	
37	MF	(United States) Caden Clark	(Germany) RB Leipzig	End of loan	December 1, 2021	
44	MF	(Mali) Youba Diarra	(Austria) Red Bull Salzburg	End of loan	December 1, 2021	
9	FW	(Brazil) Fábio	(Brazil) Oeste	End of loan	December 1, 2021	
64	FW	(United States) Jake LaCava	(United States) Tampa Bay Rowdies	Loan until December 2022	January 20, 2022	
67	FW	(The Gambia) Omar Sowe	(Iceland) Breiðablik	Loan until December 2022	March 12, 2022	
11	FW	(England) Ashley Fletcher	(England) Watford	End of loan	July 11, 2022	
24	DF	(France) Jason Pendant	(France) Quevilly-Rouen	Undisclosed transfer	July 12, 2022	
2	DF	(Uruguay) Lucas Monzón	(Uruguay) Danubio	Loan termination	July 18, 2022	
7	DF	(England) Tom Edwards	(England) Stoke City	Loan termination	September 2, 2022	
13	MF	(Canada) Tyler Pasher	Free agent	Contract termination	September 2, 2022	

Total expenditure: $1,325,000

Total revenue: $0

Net income: ▼$1,325,000

=== Draft picks ===
Round	Position	Player	College	Reference
1 (7)	DF	(United States) Matt Nocita	Naval Academy	
1 (20)	FW	(Canada) O'Vonte Mullings	Florida Gulf Coast	
3 (71)	GK	(Greece) Giannis Nikopolidis	Georgetown	
3 (73)	MF	(United States) Seth Kuhn	Penn State	

== Preseason and Friendlies ==
Preseason matches were announced on January 18, 2022. The last three matches held in February are part of the Coachella Valley Invitational which will be hosted by LA Galaxy.

January 22 Preseason	Florida Gulf Coast University	P–P	New York Red Bulls	Bradenton, Florida
				Stadium: IMG Academy
Note: Cancelled due to COVID-19 case within Florida Gulf Coast team.

January 23 Preseason	New York Red Bulls	1–3	New York City FC	Bradenton, Florida
	Ryan	Report	Héber; Kwaku	Stadium: IMG Academy

January 29 Preseason	New York Red Bulls	0–0	United States U-20	Bradenton, Florida
				Stadium: IMG Academy

=== Coachella Valley Invitational ===
February 10 Coachella Valley Invitational	New York Red Bulls	1–1	D.C. United	Indio, California
	Barlow 65'	NYRB Tweet; DCU Tweet	Flores 27'	Stadium: Empire Polo Club; Attendance: 0

February 13 Coachella Valley Invitational	LA Galaxy	2–1	New York Red Bulls	Indio, California
3:00 PM EST	Vázquez 4'; Hernández 54'	LAG Report	Mullings 68'	Stadium: Empire Polo Club; Attendance: 0

February 19 Coachella Valley Invitational	Los Angeles FC	6–1	New York Red Bulls	Indio, California
3:00 PM EST	Rodríguez 28', 34'; 31' (o.g.); Vela 46'; Fall 58'; Opoku 60'	Report	Klimala 9' (pen.)	Stadium: Empire Polo Club; Attendance: 0

=== Friendlies ===
July 30 Friendly	New York Red Bulls	0–2	FC Barcelona	Harrison, New Jersey
19:00 EDT	Cásseres Jr. (yellow card) 38'; Mullings (yellow card) 62'; Edelman (red card) 82'	Report	Araújo (yellow card) 28'; Dembélé 40'; Piqué (yellow card) 59'; Depay 87'	Stadium: Red Bull Arena; Attendance: 25,000; Referee: Ernie Constantine

== Major League Soccer season ==
=== Eastern Conference ===
Pos	Team	Pld	W	L	T	GF	GA	GD	Pts	Qualification
1	Philadelphia Union	34	19	5	10	72	26	+46	67	Qualification for the Conference semifinals & 2023 CONCACAF Champions League
2	CF Montréal (Note: Canadian clubs cannot qualify for the 2023 CONCACAF Champions League through the MLS regular season or playoffs.)	34	20	9	5	63	50	+13	65	Qualification for the first round
3	New York City FC	34	16	11	7	57	41	+16	55	Qualification for the first round
4	New York Red Bulls	34	15	11	8	50	41	+9	53	Qualification for the first round
5	FC Cincinnati	34	12	9	13	64	56	+8	49	Qualification for the first round
6	Inter Miami CF	34	14	14	6	47	56	−9	48	Qualification for the first round
7	Orlando City SC	34	14	14	6	44	53	−9	48	Qualification for the first round & 2023 CONCACAF Champions League (Note: as 2022 U.S. Open Cup champions)
8	Columbus Crew	34	10	8	16	46	41	+5	46	
9	Charlotte FC	34	13	18	3	44	52	−8	42	
10	New England Revolution	34	10	12	12	47	50	−3	42	
11	Atlanta United FC	34	10	14	10	48	54	−6	40	
12	Chicago Fire FC	34	10	15	9	39	48	−9	39	
13	Toronto FC	34	9	18	7	49	66	−17	34	
14	D.C. United	34	7	21	6	36	71	−35	27	

Source: MLS
Rules for classification: 1) points; 2) total wins; 3) total goal differential; 4) total goals scored; 5) fewer disciplinary points; 6) away goal differential; 7) away goals scored; 8) home goals differential; 9) home goals scored; 10) coin toss (2 clubs tied) or drawing of lots (≥3 clubs tied)

=== Overall ===
Pos	Team	Pld	W	L	T	GF	GA	GD	Pts	Qualification
4	Austin FC	34	16	10	8	65	49	+16	56	Qualification for the 2023 CONCACAF Champions League (Note: As highest-ranked U.S. based Division I club (based on 2022 MLS regular season record) not already qualified (USA3))
5	New York City FC	34	16	11	7	57	41	+16	55	
6	New York Red Bulls	34	15	11	8	50	41	+9	53	
7	FC Dallas	34	14	9	11	48	37	+11	53	
8	LA Galaxy	34	14	12	8	58	51	+7	50	

Source: MLS
Rules for classification: 1) points; 2) total wins; 3) total goal differential; 4) total goals scored; 5) fewer disciplinary points; 6) away goal differential; 7) away goals scored; 8) home goals differential; 9) home goals scored; 10) coin toss (2 clubs tied) or drawing of lots (≥3 clubs tied)

=== Results summary ===
Overall								Home						Away					
Pld	W	D	L	GF	GA	GD	Pts	W	D	L	GF	GA	GD	W	D	L	GF	GA	GD
34	15	8	11	50	41	+9	53	6	5	5	26	20	+6	9	3	6	24	21	+3

=== Matches ===
February 26 1	San Jose Earthquakes	1–3	New York Red Bulls	San Jose, California
6:00 p.m. EST	López 69'	Report	Klimala 45+1'; Fernandez 72'; Barlow 90+2'	Stadium: PayPal Park; Attendance: 16,146; Referee: Drew Fischer

March 5 2	Toronto FC	1–4	New York Red Bulls	Toronto, Ontario
2:00 p.m. EST	Jiménez 35'; Salcedo (yellow card) 61'	Report	Morgan 17', 24', 40'; D. Nealis (yellow card) 31'; Long 42'; Klimala (yellow card) 67'; S. Nealis (yellow card) 86'	Stadium: BMO Field; Attendance: 23,121; Referee: Rubiel Vazquez

March 13 3	New York Red Bulls	0–1	Minnesota United FC	Harrison, New Jersey
7:00 p.m. EDT	S. Nealis (yellow card) 49'; Yearwood (yellow card) 56'	Report	Wil Trapp (yellow card) 39'; Reynoso (yellow card) 45+3'; Amarilla 51'	Stadium: Red Bull Arena; Attendance: 14,848; Referee: Lukasz Szpala

March 19 4	New York Red Bulls	1–1	Columbus Crew	Harrison, New Jersey
2:00 p.m. EDT	D. Nealis (yellow card) 34'; Amaya (yellow card) 64'; Barlow 84'; Cásseres Jr. (yellow card) 86'	Report	Nagbe (yellow card) 43', (goal) 90+5'; Santos (yellow card) 80'	Stadium: Red Bull Arena; Attendance: Joseph Dickerson; Referee: 15,323

April 2 5	New England Revolution	0–1	New York Red Bulls	Foxborough, Massachusetts
7:30 p.m. EDT	Kessler (yellow card) 25'; Buksa (yellow card) 90+3' (yellow-red card) 90+4'	Report	Amaya (yellow card) 33' (yellow-red card) 73'; Barlow (yellow card) 35'; Yearwood (yellow card) 45'; Polster 90' (o.g.)	Stadium: Gillette Stadium; Attendance: 16,265; Referee: Victor Rivas

April 9 6	New York Red Bulls	1–2	CF Montréal	Harrison, New Jersey
4:00 p.m. EDT	Fernandez 14'	Report	Camacho 71'; Quioto 81'	Stadium: Red Bull Arena; Attendance: 15,734; Referee: Guido Gonzales Jr.

April 16 7	New York Red Bulls	0–0	FC Dallas	Harrison, New Jersey
7:00 p.m. EDT		Report		Stadium: Red Bull Arena; Attendance: 14,456; Referee: Fotis Bazakos

April 24 8	Orlando City SC	0–3	New York Red Bulls	Orlando, Florida
3:00 p.m. EDT		Report	Luquinhas 26'; Cásseres 48'; Morgan 88' (pen.)	Stadium: Exploria Stadium; Attendance: 17,503; Referee: Alex Chilowicz

April 30 9	Chicago Fire FC	1–2	New York Red Bulls	Chicago, Illinois
8:00 p.m. EDT	Shaqiri 17'; Durán (yellow card) 72' (yellow-red card) 80'; Czichos (yellow card) 37' (yellow-red card) 83'	Report	Klimala 75', 90+1' (pen.)	Stadium: Soldier Field; Attendance: 11,108; Referee: Jon Freemon
Note: The match was halted at the 45' +3' mark due to inclement weather. Play was resumed at 10:22 PM EDT, starting with the completion of the first-half stoppage time followed by a three minute half then the completion of the second half.

May 7 10	New York Red Bulls	1–1	Portland Timbers	Harrison, New Jersey
7:00 p.m. EDT	Long 67'; Cásseres Jr. (yellow card) 90+2'	Report	Williamson (yellow card) 46'; Niezgoda 53'	Stadium: Red Bull Arena; Attendance: 17,107; Referee: Joseph Dickerson

May 14 11	Philadelphia Union	1–1	New York Red Bulls	Chester, Pennsylvania
7:30 p.m. EDT	Gazdag 47'	Report	D. Nealis (yellow card) 25' (yellow-red card) 55'; Luquinhas 66'	Stadium: Subaru Park; Attendance: 18,579; Referee: Rubiel Vazquez

May 18 12	New York Red Bulls	3–3	Chicago Fire FC	Harrison, New Jersey
7:30 p.m. EDT	Morgan 20' (pen.); Harper 58'; Klimala 90+1'	Report	Mueller 38'; Omsberg 49'; Shaqiri 89'	Stadium: Red Bull Arena; Attendance: 13,257; Referee: Ted Unkel

May 22 13	Inter Miami CF	2–0	New York Red Bulls	Fort Lauderdale, Florida
6:00 p.m. EDT	Gregore (yellow card) 23'; Lassiter 29'; Vassilev (yellow card) 54'; Taylor 88'	Report	Long (yellow card) 60'; S. Nealis (yellow card) 81'; D. Nealis (yellow card) 90+2'	Stadium: DRV PNK Stadium; Attendance: 11,007; Referee: Jon Freemon

May 28 14	New York Red Bulls	4–1	DC United	Harrison, New Jersey
7:00 p.m. EDT	Luquinhas 54', 58'; Morgan 63'; Afaro 90' (o.g.)	Report	Kamara 87'	Stadium: Red Bull Arena; Attendance: 13,678; Referee: Allen Chapman

June 11 15	Charlotte FC	2–0	New York Red Bulls	Charlotte, North Carolina
3:00 p.m. EDT	Bender 45+4'; Jones 90+1'	Report		Stadium: Bank of America Stadium; Attendance: 32,064; Referee: Guido Gonzales Jr.

June 18 16	New York Red Bulls	2–0	Toronto FC	Harrison, New Jersey
7:00 p.m. EDT	Morgan 2'; D. Nealis (yellow card) 37'; Luquinhas 56'; Harper (yellow card) 89'	Report	Akinola (yellow card) 26'; O'Neill (yellow card) 31'; Salcedo (yellow card) 61'	Stadium: Red Bull Arena; Attendance: 19,142; Referee: Ramy Touchan

June 26 17	Los Angeles FC	2–0	New York Red Bulls	Los Angeles, California
3:00 p.m. EDT	Arango 67'; Palacios 70'; Acosta (yellow card) 83'	Report	D. Nealis (yellow card) 45+2'	Stadium: Banc of California Stadium; Referee: Joseph Dickerson

June 30 18	New York Red Bulls	2–1	Atlanta United FC	Harrison, New Jersey
8:00 p.m. EDT	Morgan 83' (pen.); Ngoma 89'	Report	Martínez 75'	Stadium: Red Bull Arena; Attendance: 14,122; Referee: Alex Chilowicz

July 3 19	Sporting Kansas City	0–1	New York Red Bulls	Kansas City, Kansas
8:00 p.m. EDT	Fontàs (yellow card) 90'	Report	Long 53'; Harper (yellow card) 57'; S. Nealis (red card) 73'; Tolkin (yellow card) 79'; Amaya (yellow card) 83'	Stadium: Children's Mercy Park; Attendance: 19,065; Referee: Marcos de Oliveira
Note: The match was suspended at the 29' mark due to inclement weather. The match was later resumed at 9:20 PM EDT after the weather was cleared.

July 9 20	FC Cincinnati	1–1	New York Red Bulls	Cincinnati, Ohio
7:30 p.m. EDT	Vazquez 20'; Cruz (yellow card) 30' (yellow-red card) 58'; Acosta (red card) 90+3'	Report	Morgan 29' (pen.)	Stadium: TQL Stadium; Attendance: 24,476; Referee: Rosendo Mendoza

July 17 21	New York Red Bulls	0–1	New York City FC	Harrison, New Jersey
5:00 p.m. EDT		Report	Castellanos 69'	Stadium: Red Bull Arena; Attendance: 25,219; Referee: Chris Penso

July 24 22	Austin FC	3–4	New York Red Bulls	Austin, Texas
8:00 p.m. EDT	Driussi 45', 69'; Finlay 81'	Report	Ngoma 14'; Yearwood 26'; Harper 51'; Barlow 65'	Stadium: Q2 Stadium; Attendance: 20,738; Referee: Guido Gonzales Jr.

August 2 23	New York Red Bulls	4–5	Colorado Rapids	Harrison, New Jersey
7:30 p.m. EDT	Yearwood 6'; Long 9'; Morgan 28' (pen.); Barlow 90+7' (pen.)	Report	Rubio 21', (yellow card) 45+2'; Abubakar (yellow card) 27'; Rosenberry 38'; Vallecilla (yellow card) 64'; Warner 77'; Barrios 80', (yellow card) 90+7'; Toure 89'	Stadium: Red Bull Arena; Attendance: 13,812; Referee: Drew Fischer
Note: The Match was originally scheduled for July 30 before it was rescheduled due to friendly match that later took its place.

August 6 24	DC United	0–0	New York Red Bulls	Washington, D.C.
7:30 p.m. EDT	Fountas (yellow card) 58'	Report	S. Nealis (yellow card) 90+2'	Stadium: Audi Field; Attendance: 16,258; Referee: Pierre-Luc Lauziere

August 13 25	New York Red Bulls	0–1	Orlando City SC	Harrison, New Jersey
6:00 p.m. EDT	Tolkin (yellow card) 12'; Cásseres (yellow card) 32'	Report	Moutinho (yellow card) 16'; Torres 17'	Stadium: Red Bull Arena; Referee: Rubiel Vazquez

August 17 26	Atlanta United FC	1–2	New York Red Bulls	Atlanta, Georgia
7:30 p.m. EDT	Martínez 90+4'	Report	Morgan 11'; Tolkin 15'	Stadium: Mercedes-Benz Stadium; Attendance: 42,555; Referee: Ted Unkel

August 20 27	New York Red Bulls	1–1	FC Cincinnati	Harrison, New Jersey
6:00 p.m. EDT	Klimala 23' (pen.); Edelman (yellow card) 85'	Report	Miazga 13', (yellow card) 37'; Nwobodo (yellow card) 66'	Stadium: Red Bull Arena; Attendance: 16,525; Referee: Ismail Elfath

August 27 28	New York Red Bulls	3–1	Inter Miami CF	Harrison, New Jersey
7:00 p.m. EDT	Duncan (yellow card) 36' (yellow-red card) 70'; Morgan 43'; Edelman 53'; Clark 74'	Report	Higuaín 19'; Pozuelo (red card) 29'	Stadium: Red Bull Arena; Attendance: 21,374; Referee: Fotis Bazakos

August 31 29	CF Montréal	0–1	New York Red Bulls	Montreal, Quebec
7:30 p.m. EDT		Report	Morgan 43'	Stadium: Saputo Stadium; Attendance: 15,075; Referee: Victor Rivas

September 3 30	New York Red Bulls	0–2	Philadelphia Union	Harrison, New Jersey
7:00 p.m. EDT	Yearwood (yellow card) 90+3' (yellow-red card) 90+4'	Report	Glesnes (yellow card) 8'; Burke (yellow card) 32'; Elliott (yellow card) 36'; Uhre 48'; Gazdag 74', (yellow card) 83'	Stadium: Red Bull Arena; Attendance: 16,247; Referee: Timothy Ford

September 10 31	New York Red Bulls	2–1	New England Revolution	Harrison, New Jersey
6:00 p.m. EDT	Cásseres Jr. 58'; Morgan 78' (pen.)	Report	McNamara 53'	Stadium: Red Bull Arena; Attendance: 16,301; Referee: Alex Chilowicz

September 17 32	New York City FC	2–0	New York Red Bulls	New York, New York
1:00 p.m. EDT	Callens 1'; Rodríguez 23' (yellow card) 89'; Acevedo (yellow card) 46'; Moralez (yellow card) 63'	Report	Morgan (yellow card) 25'; Duncan (yellow card) 28'; Cásseres Jr. (yellow card) 86'; Edelman (yellow card) 89'	Stadium: Yankee Stadium; Attendance: 30,151; Referee: Allen Chapman

October 1 33	Columbus Crew	2–1	New York Red Bulls	Columbus, Ohio
7:00 p.m. EDT	Etienne 89', 90+3'	Report	Amaya 53'	Stadium: Lower.com Field; Attendance: 20,757; Referee: Marcos de Oliveira

October 9 34	New York Red Bulls	2–0	Charlotte FC	Harrison, New Jersey
2:30 p.m. EDT	Manoel 8', 55'	Report		Stadium: Red Bull Arena; Attendance: 23,672; Referee: Rubiel Vazquez

== MLS Cup Playoffs ==
October 15 First Round	New York Red Bulls	1–2	FC Cincinnati	Harrison, New Jersey
12:30 p.m. EDT	Morgan 49'	Report	Acosta 74' (pen.); Vazquez 86'	Stadium: Red Bull Arena; Attendance: 17,113; Referee: Alex Chilowicz

== U.S. Open Cup ==
April 20 Third Round	Hartford Athletic	1–2	New York Red Bulls	Hartford, Connecticut
7:00 p.m. EDT	McGlynn 52'	Report	Morgan 18'; Long 25'; Cásseres (red card) 90+4'	Stadium: Trinity Health Stadium

May 10 Round of 32	D.C. United	0–3	New York Red Bulls	Washington, D.C.
7:30 p.m. EDT		Report	Luquinhas 45+3'; Tolkin 48'; Ryan 68'	Stadium: Audi Field

May 25 Round of 16	New York Red Bulls	3–1	Charlotte FC	Montclair, New Jersey
8:00 p.m. EDT	Klimala 2'; D. Nealis 63'; Barlow 90+2'	Report	Ríos 8'	Stadium: MSU Soccer Park; Attendance: 3,500; Referee: Ernie Constantine

June 22 Quarterfinals	New York Red Bulls	3–0	New York City FC	Harrison, New Jersey
8:00 p.m. EDT	Morgan 52'; Luquinhas 70'; Fernandez 90+1'; Edwards (red card) 90+6'	Report	Andrade (red card) 62'; Moralez (red card) 90+6'	Stadium: Red Bull Arena; Attendance: 12,575; Referee: Matthew Thompson

July 27 Semifinals	Orlando City SC	5–1	New York Red Bulls	Orlando, Florida
7:30 PM EDT	Araújo 45+5', 62', (yellow card) 71'; Pereyra 47'; Ruan (yellow card) 51'; Pato (yellow card) 52'; Torres 75'; Michel 83'; Gioacchini (yellow card) 89'	Report	Luquinhas (yellow card) 30'; Morgan 45+1'; S. Nealis (yellow card) 55'; Coronel (yellow card) 77'	Stadium: Exploria Stadium; Attendance: 11,612; Referee: Victor Rivas

== Competitions summary ==
Competition	Record							
Competition	G	W	D	L	GF	GA	GD	Win %
MLS Regular Season	34	15	8	11	50	41	+9	44.12
MLS Cup Playoffs	1	0	0	1	1	2	−1	0.00
U.S. Open Cup	5	4	0	1	12	7	+5	80.00
Total	40	19	8	13	63	50	+13	47.50

== Player statistics ==
As of October 15, 2022.

No.	Pos	Nat	Player	Total		MLS		Playoffs		Open Cup	
No.	Pos	Nat	Player	Apps	Goals	Apps	Goals	Apps	Goals	Apps	Goals
Goalkeepers
1	GK	(Brazil) BRA	Carlos Coronel	37	-47	33	-39	1	-2	3	-6
18	GK	(United States) USA	Ryan Meara	3	-3	1	-2	0	0	2	-1
40	GK	(United States) USA	AJ Marcucci	0	0	0	0	0	0	0	0
Defenders
4	DF	(Colombia) COL	Andrés Reyes	13	0	8+4	0	1	0	0	0
6	DF	(United States) USA	Kyle Duncan	10	0	6+3	0	0+1	0	0	0
12	DF	(United States) USA	Dylan Nealis	33	1	19+8	0	0+1	0	5	1
15	DF	(United States) USA	Sean Nealis	38	0	32	0	1	0	5	0
33	DF	(United States) USA	Aaron Long	35	5	28+1	4	1	0	5	1
47	DF	(United States) USA	John Tolkin	35	2	29	1	1	0	5	1
98	DF	(Cameroon) CMR	Hassan Ndam	2	0	1+1	0	0	0	0	0
Midfielders
8	MF	(United States) USA	Frankie Amaya	29	1	22+1	1	1	0	4+1	0
10	MF	(Scotland) SCO	Lewis Morgan	38	18	32+1	14	1	1	3+1	3
16	MF	(England) ENG	Dru Yearwood	27	2	18+6	2	0	0	2+1	0
17	MF	(United States) USA	Cameron Harper	19	2	6+10	2	0	0	0+3	0
19	MF	(Venezuela) VEN	Wikelman Carmona	2	0	0+2	0	0	0	0	0
21	MF	(United States) USA	Omir Fernandez	32	3	20+6	2	1	0	4+1	1
22	MF	(United States) USA	Serge Ngoma	7	2	1+5	2	0+1	0	0	0
23	MF	(Venezuela) VEN	Cristian Cásseres	30	2	23+3	2	0	0	3+1	0
30	MF	(Venezuela) VEN	Jesús Castellano	1	0	0	0	0	0	0+1	0
37	MF	(United States) USA	Caden Clark	17	1	3+13	1	0	0	0+1	0
65	MF	(Uganda) UGA	Steven Sserwadda	3	0	0+2	0	0	0	0+1	0
75	MF	(United States) USA	Daniel Edelman	19	1	10+5	1	1	0	3	0
82	MF	(Brazil) BRA	Luquinhas	36	7	21+9	5	1	0	5	2
91	MF	(United States) USA	Bento Estrela	0	0	0	0	0	0	0	0
Forwards
9	FW	(Poland) POL	Patryk Klimala	32	6	19+8	5	0+1	0	3+1	1
11	FW	(Brazil) BRA	Elias Manoel	7	2	5+1	2	1	0	0	0
28	FW	(United States) USA	Zach Ryan	7	1	0+5	0	0	0	0+2	1
74	FW	(United States) USA	Tom Barlow	37	5	7+25	4	0	0	2+3	1
Left Club During Season
2	DF	(Uruguay) URU	Lucas Monzón	1	0	0	0	0	0	0+1	0
7	DF	(England) ENG	Tom Edwards	12	0	8+1	0	0	0	2+1	0
11	FW	(England) ENG	Ashley Fletcher	7	0	3+4	0	0	0	0	0
24	DF	(France) FRA	Jason Pendant	5	0	0+4	0	0	0	0+1	0

=== Top scorers ===
Place	Position	Number	Name	MLS	Playoffs	Open Cup	Total
1	MF	10	(Scotland) Lewis Morgan	14	1	3	18
2	MF	82	(Brazil) Luquinhas	5	0	2	7
3	FW	9	(Poland) Patryk Klimala	5	0	1	6
3	DF	33	(United States) Aaron Long	4	0	1	5
3	FW	74	(United States) Tom Barlow	4	0	1	5
4	MF	21	(United States) Omir Fernandez	2	0	1	3
5	FW	11	(Brazil) Elias Manoel	2	0	0	2
5	MF	16	(England) Dru Yearwood	2	0	0	2
5	MF	17	(United States) Cameron Harper	2	0	0	2
5	MF	22	(United States) Serge Ngoma	2	0	0	2
5	MF	23	(Venezuela) Cristian Cásseres	2	0	0	2
5	DF	47	(United States) John Tolkin	1	0	1	2
6	MF	8	(United States) Frankie Amaya	1	0	0	1
6	DF	12	(United States) Dylan Nealis	0	0	1	1
6	FW	28	(United States) Zach Ryan	0	0	1	1
6	MF	37	(United States) Caden Clark	1	0	0	1
6	MF	75	(United States) Daniel Edelman	1	0	0	1
Own goals				2	0	0	2
Total				50	1	12	63

As of October 15, 2022.

=== Assist Leaders ===
Place	Position	Number	Name	MLS	Playoffs	Open Cup	Total
1	MF	82	(Brazil) Luquinhas	3	0	3	6
2	FW	9	(Poland) Patryk Klimala	3	0	2	5
3	MF	23	(Venezuela) Cristian Cásseres	4	0	0	4
4	MF	8	(United States) Frankie Amaya	3	0	0	3
4	MF	10	(Scotland) Lewis Morgan	3	0	0	3
4	MF	17	(United States) Cameron Harper	2	0	1	3
4	MF	21	(United States) Omir Fernandez	3	0	0	3
4	DF	47	(United States) John Tolkin	3	0	0	3
5	DF	12	(United States) Dylan Nealis	2	0	0	2
5	MF	16	(England) Dru Yearwood	1	0	1	2
5	DF	33	(United States) Aaron Long	0	0	2	2
6	FW	11	(Brazil) Elias Manoel	1	0	0	1
6	MF	37	(United States) Caden Clark	1	0	0	1
Total				29	0	9	38

As of October 15, 2022.

=== Cleansheets ===
Place	Position	Number	Name	MLS	Playoffs	Open Cup	Total
1	GK	1	(Brazil) Carlos Coronel	8	0	1	9
2	GK	18	(United States) Ryan Meara	0	0	1	1
Total				8	0	2	10

As of October 15, 2022

=== Disciplinary record ===
No.	Pos.	Nat.	Player	MLS		Playoffs		Open Cup		Total	
No.	Pos.	Nat.	Player	Booked	Sent off (straight red)	Booked	Sent off (straight red)	Booked	Sent off (straight red)	Booked	Sent off (straight red)
1	GK	(Brazil)	Carlos Coronel	2	0	0	0	1	0	3	0
6	DF	(United States)	Kyle Duncan	4	1	0	0	0	0	4	1
7	DF	(England)	Tom Edwards	6	0	0	0	1	1	7	1
8	MF	(United States)	Frankie Amaya	5	1	1	0	0	0	6	1
9	FW	(Poland)	Patryk Klimala	6	0	0	0	0	0	6	0
10	MF	(Scotland)	Lewis Morgan	2	0	0	0	1	0	3	0
11	FW	(England)	Ashley Fletcher	2	0	0	0	0	0	2	0
12	DF	(United States)	Dylan Nealis	7	1	0	0	2	0	9	1
15	DF	(United States)	Sean Nealis	6	1	0	0	3	0	9	1
16	MF	(England)	Dru Yearwood	6	1	0	0	1	0	7	1
17	MF	(United States)	Cameron Harper	5	0	0	0	2	0	7	0
21	MF	(United States)	Omir Fernandez	1	0	0	0	0	0	1	0
23	MF	(Venezuela)	Cristian Cásseres	10	0	0	0	1	1	11	1
24	DF	(France)	Jason Pendant	0	0	0	0	1	0	1	0
28	FW	(United States)	Zach Ryan	1	0	0	0	0	0	1	0
33	DF	(United States)	Aaron Long	6	0	0	0	1	0	7	0
37	MF	(United States)	Caden Clark	2	0	0	0	0	0	2	0
47	DF	(United States)	John Tolkin	7	0	0	0	0	0	7	0
74	FW	(United States)	Tom Barlow	2	0	0	0	0	0	2	0
75	DF	(United States)	Daniel Edelman	4	0	0	0	1	0	5	0
82	MF	(Brazil)	Luquinhas	1	0	0	0	1	0	2	0
Totals				81	5	1	0	16	2	99	7

As of October 15, 2022.
