= 2021 New York Red Bulls season =

New York Red Bulls
2021 season
- Director of Sport: Kevin Thelwell
- Head coach: Gerhard Struber
- Major League Soccer: Conference: 7th Overall: 14th
- MLS Cup Playoffs: First round
- U.S. Open Cup: Canceled
- Top goalscorer: League: Patryk Klimala (8 goals); All: Patryk Klimala (8 goals)
Home colors	Away colors

The 2021 New York Red Bulls season was the club's twenty-sixth season in Major League Soccer, the top division of soccer in the United States.

== Team information ==
=== Squad information ===
As of November 20, 2021

Appearances and goals are career totals from all-competitions.

Squad No.	Name	Nationality	Position(s)	Date of birth (age)	Signed from	Games played	Goals scored
Goalkeepers
13	Carlos Coronel	(Brazil)	GK	December 29, 1996 (aged 24)	(Austria) Red Bull Salzburg (on loan)	35	0
18	Ryan Meara	(United States)	GK	November 15, 1990 (aged 31)	(United States) Fordham University	54	0
88	Luca Lewis	(United States)	GK	February 22, 2001 (aged 20)	(United States) New York Red Bulls II	0	0
Defenders
2	Lucas Monzón	(Uruguay)	CB	September 29, 2001 (aged 20)	(Uruguay) Danubio (on loan)	1	0
4	Andrés Reyes	(Colombia)	CB	August 9, 1999 (aged 22)	(Colombia) Atlético Nacional	20	2
5	Andrew Gutman	(United States)	LB	October 2, 1996 (aged 25)	(United States) Atlanta United FC (on loan)	23	2
6	Kyle Duncan	(United States)	RB	August 8, 1997 (aged 24)	(France) Valenciennes	77	5
7	Tom Edwards	(England)	RB/LB	January 22, 1999 (aged 22)	(England) Stoke City (on loan)	28	0
15	Sean Nealis	(United States)	CB	January 13, 1997 (aged 24)	(United States) Hofstra University	46	2
20	Issiar Dramé	(France)	CB	February 16, 1999 (aged 22)	(Ukraine) Olimpik Donetsk	0	0
24	Jason Pendant	(France)	LB	February 9, 1997 (aged 24)	(France) Sochaux	23	0
33	Aaron Long	(United States)	CB	October 12, 1992 (aged 29)	(United States) New York Red Bulls II	140	9
39	Mandela Egbo	(England)	RB	August 17, 1997 (aged 24)	(Germany) SV Darmstadt 98	11	1
47	John Tolkin	(United States)	CB	July 31, 2002 (aged 19)	Academy	29	1
Midfielders
8	Frankie Amaya	(United States)	CM	September 26, 2000 (aged 21)	(United States) FC Cincinnati	22	1
16	Dru Yearwood	(England)	CM	February 17, 2000 (aged 21)	(England) Brentford	43	1
17	Cameron Harper	(United States)	RW/LW	November 19, 2001 (aged 20)	(Scotland) Celtic	7	0
19	Wikelman Carmona	(Venezuela)	CM	February 24, 2003 (aged 18)	(Venezuela) Academia Dynamo FC	25	1
21	Omir Fernandez	(United States)	RW/LW	February 8, 1999 (aged 22)	Academy	59	8
23	Cristian Cásseres Jr.	(Venezuela)	CM	January 20, 2000 (aged 21)	(Venezuela) Deportivo La Guaira	76	12
27	Sean Davis	(United States)	CM	February 8, 1993 (aged 28)	Academy	208	7
37	Caden Clark	(United States)	CM	May 27, 2003 (aged 18)	(United States) New York Red Bulls II	33	7
44	Youba Diarra	(Mali)	CM	September 7, 1998 (aged 23)	(Austria) Red Bull Salzburg (on loan)	8	0
77	Daniel Royer	(Austria)	RW/LW	May 22, 1990 (aged 31)	(Denmark) FC Midtjylland	156	50
91	Bento Estrela	(United States)	CM	February 10, 2006 (aged 15)	Academy	0	0
Forwards
9	Fábio	(Brazil)	FW	May 25, 1997 (aged 24)	(Brazil) Oeste (on loan)	31	7
10	Patryk Klimala	(Poland)	FW	August 5, 1998 (aged 23)	(Scotland) Celtic	31	8
67	Omar Sowe	(The Gambia)	FW	October 28, 2000 (aged 21)	(United States) New York Red Bulls II	1	0
74	Tom Barlow	(United States)	FW	July 8, 1995 (aged 26)	(United States) New York Red Bulls II	59	9

== Roster transactions ==
=== In ===
#	Pos.	Player	Signed from	Details	Date	Source
88	GK	(United States) Luca Lewis	(United States) New York Red Bulls II	Free transfer	December 11, 2020	
4	DF	(Colombia) Andrés Reyes	(Colombia) Atlético Nacional	Undisclosed transfer	January 19, 2021	
19	MF	(Venezuela) Wikelman Carmona	(Venezuela) Academia Dynamo FC	Undisclosed transfer	January 25, 2021	
7	DF	(England) Tom Edwards	(England) Stoke City	Loan until December 2021	January 27, 2021	
9	FW	(Brazil) Fábio	(Brazil) Oeste	Loan until December 2021	February 5, 2021	
91	MF	(United States) Bento Estrela	Academy	Homegrown Player	February 9, 2021	
13	GK	(Brazil) Carlos Coronel	(Austria) Red Bull Salzburg	Loan until December 2021	February 26, 2021	
44	MF	(Mali) Youba Diarra	(Austria) Red Bull Salzburg	Loan until December 2021	March 1, 2021	
17	FW	(United States) Cameron Harper	(Scotland) Celtic	Undisclosed transfer	March 5, 2021	
5	DF	(United States) Andrew Gutman	(United States) Atlanta United FC	Loan until December 2021	March 9, 2021	
8	MF	(United States) Frankie Amaya	(United States) FC Cincinnati	$950,000 (Note: New York could pay an additional $125,000 in allocation money if certain performance incentives are met)	April 20, 2021	
10	FW	(Poland) Patryk Klimala	(Scotland) Celtic	$4,800,000	April 22, 2021	
2	DF	(Uruguay) Lucas Monzón	(Uruguay) Danubio	Loan until December 2022	August 5, 2021	
20	DF	(France) Issiar Dramé	(Ukraine) Olimpik Donetsk	Free transfer	September 29, 2021	

=== Out ===
#	Pos.	Player	Signed by	Details	Date	Source
7	DF	(United States) Patrick Seagrist	(United States) Inter Miami CF	Option declined	November 30, 2020	
80	MF	(United States) Chris Lema	(United States) San Antonio FC	Option declined	November 30, 2020	
17	MF	(United States) Ben Mines	(United States) FC Cincinnati	Option declined	November 30, 2020	
90	MF	(Germany) Marc Rzatkowski	(Germany) Schalke 04	Option declined	November 30, 2020	
40	GK	(United States) Kendall McIntosh	(United States) Sporting Kansas City	End of contract	November 30, 2020	
11	FW	(Ghana) Samuel Tetteh	(Austria) Red Bull Salzburg	End of loan	November 30, 2020	
25	FW	(Denmark) Mathias Jørgensen	(Denmark) AGF	Loan until June 2021	December 8, 2020	
8	MF	(United States) Jared Stroud	(United States) Austin FC	2020 MLS Expansion Draft (Note: New York will receive $50,000 in allocation money for having a player selected)	December 15, 2020	
26	DF	(United States) Tim Parker	(United States) Houston Dynamo	$450,000 (Note: New York could receive additional $600,000 in allocation money if certain performance incentives are met)	January 19, 2021	
42	FW	(United States) Brian White	(Canada) Vancouver Whitecaps FC	$400,000 (Note: New York could receive additional $100,000 in allocation money if certain performance incentives are met)	June 2, 2021	
1	GK	(Denmark) David Jensen	(Belgium) K.V.C. Westerlo	Loan until June 2022	June 17, 2021	
22	MF	(France) Florian Valot	(United States) FC Cincinnati	$50,000 (Note: New York will receive $50,000 in allocation money for the 2022 season and an additional $50,000 if certain performance incentives are met)	August 5, 2021	
3	DF	(Egypt) Amro Tarek	(Egypt) El Gouna FC	Free transfer	September 9, 2021	

Total expenditure: $5,750,000

Total revenue: $500,000

Net income: ▼$5,250,000

=== Draft picks ===
Round	Position	Player	College	Reference
1 (13)	FW	(Guadeloupe) Luther Archimède	Syracuse	
2 (40)	MF	(Guinea) Lamine Conte	Louisville	
3 (67)	GK	(United States) AJ Marcucci	Connecticut College	
3 (81)	Passed			

== Preseason and Friendlies ==
=== Preseason ===
March 13 Preseason	New York Red Bulls	P–P	West Chester United	Hanover, New Jersey
2:00 p.m. EST				Stadium: New York Red Bulls Training Facility
Note: Cancelled due to COVID-19 concerns

March 19 Preseason	New York Red Bulls	P–P	New Amsterdam FC	Hanover, New Jersey
2:00 p.m. EDT				Stadium: New York Red Bulls Training Facility
Note: Cancelled due to COVID-19 concerns

March 24 Preseason	New York Red Bulls	P–P	Nashville SC	Bradenton, Florida
3:00 p.m. EDT				Stadium: IMG Academy
Note: Canceled due to a match official testing positive for COVID-19

March 27 Preseason	New York Red Bulls	0–2	Miami FC	Bradenton, Florida
2:00 p.m. EDT		Report	Williams 27'; Reid 32'	Stadium: IMG Academy
Note: Match composed of two 30 minute halves

April 3 Preseason	New York Red Bulls	3–1	Tampa Bay Rowdies	Bradenton, Florida
12:00 p.m. EDT		Report		Stadium: IMG Academy
Note: Originally scheduled as a dual scrimmage between Tampa Bay and Inter Miami CF, but was altered due to health and safety reasons

April 10 Preseason	New York Red Bulls	1–1	D.C. United	Harrison, New Jersey
1:00 p.m. EDT	Royer 60' (pen.)		Sorga 52'	Stadium: Red Bull Arena

== Major League Soccer season ==
=== Eastern Conference ===
Pos	Team	Pld	W	L	T	GF	GA	GD	Pts	Qualification
1	New England Revolution	34	22	5	7	65	41	+24	73	Qualification for the playoffs conference semifinals and CONCACAF Champions League
2	Philadelphia Union	34	14	8	12	48	35	+13	54	Qualification for the playoffs first round
3	Nashville SC	34	12	4	18	55	33	+22	54	Qualification for the playoffs first round
4	New York City FC (C)	34	14	11	9	56	36	+20	51	Qualification for the playoffs first round and CONCACAF Champions League (Note: As MLS Cup 2021 champions)
5	Atlanta United FC	34	13	9	12	45	37	+8	51	Qualification for the playoffs first round
6	Orlando City SC	34	13	9	12	50	48	+2	51	Qualification for the playoffs first round
7	New York Red Bulls	34	13	12	9	39	33	+6	48	Qualification for the playoffs first round
8	D.C. United	34	14	15	5	56	54	+2	47	
9	Columbus Crew	34	13	13	8	46	45	+1	47	
10	CF Montréal (Note: Canadian clubs cannot qualify for the 2022 CONCACAF Champions League through the MLS regular season or playoffs.)	34	12	12	10	46	44	+2	46	Qualification for the CONCACAF Champions League (Note: As 2021 Canadian Championship winners)
11	Inter Miami CF	34	12	17	5	36	53	−17	41	
12	Chicago Fire FC	34	9	18	7	36	54	−18	34	
13	Toronto FC	34	6	18	10	39	66	−27	28	
14	FC Cincinnati	34	4	22	8	37	74	−37	20	

Source: MLS
Rules for classification: 1) points; 2) total wins; 3) total goal differential; 4) total goals scored; 5) fewer disciplinary points; 6) away goal differential; 7) away goals scored; 8) home goals differential; 9) home goals scored; 10) coin toss (2 clubs tied) or drawing of lots (≥3 clubs tied)
(C) Champions

=== Overall ===
Pos	Team	Pld	W	L	T	GF	GA	GD	Pts
12	Vancouver Whitecaps FC	34	12	9	13	45	45	0	49
13	Real Salt Lake	34	14	14	6	55	54	+1	48
14	New York Red Bulls	34	13	12	9	39	33	+6	48
15	LA Galaxy	34	13	12	9	50	54	−4	48
16	D.C. United	34	14	15	5	56	54	+2	47

Source: MLS
Rules for classification: 1) points; 2) total wins; 3) total goal differential; 4) total goals scored; 5) fewer disciplinary points; 6) away goal differential; 7) away goals scored; 8) home goals differential; 9) home goals scored; 10) coin toss (2 clubs tied) or drawing of lots (≥3 clubs tied)

=== Results summary ===
Overall								Home						Away					
Pld	W	D	L	GF	GA	GD	Pts	W	D	L	GF	GA	GD	W	D	L	GF	GA	GD
34	13	9	12	39	33	+6	48	8	6	3	19	11	+8	5	3	9	20	22	−2

=== Matches ===
April 17 1	New York Red Bulls	1–2	Sporting Kansas City	Harrison, New Jersey
8:00 p.m. EDT	Diarra (yellow card) 41'; Clark 48'	Report	Isimat-Mirin (yellow card) 9'; Kinda 59' (pen.); Sallói 60'	Stadium: Red Bull Arena; Referee: Robert Sibiga

April 25 2	LA Galaxy	3–2	New York Red Bulls	Carson, California
5:30 p.m. EDT	Hernández 9', 41', 60'; Grandsir (yellow card) 63'; Álvarez (yellow card) 90+1'	Report	Gutman 26'; Cásseres 63'; Clark (yellow card) 87'; Yearwood (yellow card) 90+5'	Stadium: Dignity Health Sports Park; Attendance: 6,853; Referee: Victor Rivas

May 1 3	New York Red Bulls	2–0	Chicago Fire FC	Harrison, New Jersey
1:00 p.m. EDT	Davis (yellow card) 42'; Cásseres 47'; Clark 64'	Report	Sekulić (yellow card) 44'; Clavo (yellow card) 62'	Stadium: Red Bull Arena; Referee: Christina Unkel

May 8 4	New York Red Bulls	2–0	Toronto FC	Harrison, New Jersey
1:00 p.m. EDT	Gutman (yellow card) 31'; Amaya 32', (yellow card) 59'; Clark 69'	Report	Laryea (yellow card) 73'; Gonzalez (yellow card) 78'	Stadium: Red Bull Arena; Referee: Guido Gonzales Jr.

May 15 5	Philadelphia Union	1–0	New York Red Bulls	Chester, Pennsylvania
7:30 p.m. EDT	Burke 7'; Flach (yellow card) 90+3'	Report	Nealis (yellow card) 61'; Yearwood (yellow card) 79' (yellow-red card) 90+2'	Stadium: Subaru Park; Attendance: 5,000; Referee: Allen Chapman

May 22 6	New England Revolution	3–1	New York Red Bulls	Foxborough, Massachusetts
8:00 p.m. EDT	Bou 36'; Buchanan 45+2'; Buksa 82'	Report	Reyes 7', (yellow card) 31' (yellow-red card) 38'	Stadium: Gillette Stadium; Referee: Jair Marrufo

May 29 7	New York Red Bulls	2–1	Orlando City SC	Harrison, New Jersey
1:00 p.m. EDT	Clark 35'; Cásseres Jr. 60', (yellow card) 80'; Davis (yellow card) 65'	Report	Jansson (yellow card) 74'; van der Water 84'	Stadium: Red Bull Arena; Referee: Ismail Elfath

June 18 8	New York Red Bulls	2–0	Nashville SC	Harrison, New Jersey
8:00 p.m. EDT	Fábio 37'; Duncan 56', (yellow card) 71'; Klimala (yellow card) 58'	Report		Stadium: Red Bull Arena; Attendance: 10,173; Referee: Nima Saghafi

June 23 9	New England Revolution	3–2	New York Red Bulls	Foxborough, Massachusetts
7:00 p.m. EDT	Buchanan 26'; Polster (yellow card) 29'; Jones 35'; Bou 52'	Report	Duncan (yellow card) 29'; Klimala 53'; Reyes 75'	Stadium: Gillette Stadium; Referee: Robert Sibiga

June 27 10	Atlanta United FC	0–0	New York Red Bulls	Atlanta, Georgia
3:30 p.m. EDT	Sosa (yellow card) 65'; Franco (yellow card) 90+5'	Report	Edwards (yellow card) 22'; Davis (yellow card) 69'; Tolkin (yellow card) 85'; Tarek (yellow card) 86'	Stadium: Mercedes-Benz Stadium; Referee: Alan Kelly

July 3 11	Orlando City SC	1–2	New York Red Bulls	Orlando, Florida
7:30 p.m. EDT	Urso (yellow card) 2'; Pereyra (yellow card) 41'; Mueller 59'	Report	Cásseres Jr. 6'; Duncan (yellow card) 22'; Fábio (yellow card) 34', (goal) 79'; Yearwood (yellow card) 57'; Barlow (yellow card) 90+6'	Stadium: Exploria Stadium; Attendance: 19,009; Referee: Joseph Dickerson

July 8 12	New York Red Bulls	1–1	Philadelphia Union	Harrison, New Jersey
8:30 PM ET	Yearwood (yellow card) 45+2'; Klimala 60' (pen.)	Report	Mbaizo (yellow card) 42'; Freese (red card) 57'; Santos 85'; Monteiro (yellow card) 90+7'	Stadium: Red Bull Arena; Attendance: 9,477; Referee: Victor Rivas
Note: The match was originally scheduled to start at 8:00 PM ET, however it was delayed by a half-hour due to inclement weather.

July 17	New York Red Bulls	Postponed	Inter Miami CF	Harrison, New Jersey
8:15 PM EDT		Report		Stadium: Red Bull Arena
Note: The match was originally scheduled to kick off at 7:00 PM EDT. After a short delay, the players we able to come out for warmups only to return to the lockers due to further lightning. The match was later postponed and was moved to October 9.

July 21 13	Toronto FC	1–1	New York Red Bulls	Toronto, Ontario
7:30 p.m. EDT	Priso-Mbongue 62', (yellow card) 81'; Pozuelo (yellow card) 72'; Soteldo (yellow card) 90+2'	Report	Klimala 46'; Edwards (yellow card) 71'	Stadium: BMO Field; Referee: Silviu Petrescu

July 25 14	D.C. United	1–0	New York Red Bulls	Washington, D.C.
8:00 p.m. EDT	Alfaro (yellow card) 12'; Kamara 27'; Brillant (yellow card) 87'; Hamid (yellow card) 90+6'	Report	Fábio (yellow card) 46'; Klimala (yellow card) 69'; Edwards (yellow card) 80'; Cásseres Jr. (yellow card) 83'	Stadium: Audi Field; Attendance: 15,912; Referee: Alan Kelly

July 31 15	New York Red Bulls	2–3	New England Revolution	Harrison, New Jersey
6:00 p.m. EDT	Carmona 8'; Cásseres Jr. (yellow card) 34'; Fábio 63'; Clark (yellow card) 70'		Farrell (yellow card) 39'; Traustason (yellow card) 45+1'; Bou 60'; Bye 84'; Buksa 90+1'	Stadium: Red Bull Arena; Attendance: 13,444; Referee: Ramy Touchan

August 4 16	New York Red Bulls	0–0	FC Cincinnati	Harrison, New Jersey
8:00 PM EDT	Tarek (yellow card) 23'; Yearwood (yellow card) 88'	Report	Cruz (yellow card) 32'; Barreal (yellow card) 70'; Kubo (yellow card) 77'	Stadium: Red Bull Arena; Attendance: 9,203; Referee: Jon Freemon

August 8 17	Chicago Fire FC	2–1	New York Red Bulls	Chicago, Illinois
8:00 PM EDT	Stojanovic 2', 8'; Offor (yellow card) 90+5'	Report	Edwards (yellow card) 21'; Davis (yellow card) 39'; Tarek (yellow card) 69'; Gutman (yellow card) 77'; Barlow 90+7'	Stadium: Soldier Field; Attendance: 11,894; Referee: Guido Gonzales Jr.

August 14 18	CF Montréal	2–1	New York Red Bulls	Montreal, Quebec
8:00 p.m. EDT	Klimala 45+5' (pen.); Tarek (yellow card) 53'; Yearwood (yellow card) 89'; Duncan (yellow card) 90+5'; Coronel (yellow card) 90+7'	Report	Ibrahim 71'; Wanyama 90+8'; Brault-Guillard (yellow card) 90+12'	Stadium: Saputo Stadium; Referee: Allen Chapman

August 18 19	New York Red Bulls	1–0	Columbus Crew	Harrison, New Jersey
8:00 p.m. EDT	Tolkin 33'; Klimala (yellow card) 55'	Report	Hurtado (yellow card) 84'	Stadium: Red Bull Arena; Attendance: 10,002; Referee: Chris Penso

August 21	New York Red Bulls	Postponed	New York City FC	Harrison, New Jersey
8:00 p.m. EDT		Report		Stadium: Red Bull Arena
Note: The match was originally scheduled to kick off at 8:00 PM EDT and was delayed up to 10:42 PM EDT due to a rain delay. After the referees determined that the pitch was unplayable, the match was postponed and was later rescheduled to September 22

August 28 20	New York Red Bulls	0–1	Chicago Fire FC	Harrison, New Jersey
6:00 p.m. CDT	Reyes (yellow card) 73'; Duncan (yellow card) 78'	Report	Berić 32'; Terán (yellow card) 81'	Stadium: Red Bull Arena; Attendance: 12,018; Referee: Victor Rivas

September 11 21	New York Red Bulls	1–1	D.C. United	Harrison, New Jersey
7:00 p.m. EDT	Yearwood 5'; Nealis (yellow card) 44'; Edwards (yellow card) 75'	Report	Kamara 44' (pen.); Skundrich (yellow card) 50'	Stadium: Red Bull Arena; Attendance: 12,574; Referee: Robert Sibiga

September 14 22	Columbus Crew	2–1	New York Red Bulls	Columbus, Ohio
7:30 p.m. EDT	Nagbe 74'; Berry 88'	Report	Klimala 25'; Yearwood (yellow card) 33'	Stadium: Lower.com Field; Attendance: 17,358; Referee: Jair Marrufo

September 17 23	Inter Miami CF	0–4	New York Red Bulls	Fort Lauderdale, Florida
7:00 p.m. EDT	Figal (yellow card) 9' (yellow-red card) 38'; González Pírez (yellow card) 20'; Higuaín (yellow card) 45+1'	Report	Klimala 18'; Fernandez 31'; Edwards (yellow card) 57'; Fábio 65', 89'; Barlow (yellow card) 81'; Harper (yellow card) 86'	Stadium: Inter Miami CF Stadium; Attendance: 18,535; Referee: Guido Gonzales, Jr.

September 22 24	New York Red Bulls	1–1	New York City FC	Harrison, New Jersey
8:00 p.m. EDT	Davis (yellow card) 45'; Reyes (yellow card) 61'; Klimala (yellow card) 80' (goal) 90+12' (pen.); Duncan (yellow card) 82'; Clark (yellow card) 85'	Report	Callens (yellow card) 24'; Castellanos 31'; Tinnerholm (yellow card) 44'; Parks (red card) 73'; Chanot (yellow card) 84' (yellow-red card) 90+1'	Stadium: Red Bull Arena; Attendance: 16,072; Referee: Ismail Elfath
Note: This match was originally scheduled on August 21 which was postponed due to unsafe pitch conditions after a rain delay.

September 25 25	New York City FC	0–1	New York Red Bulls	New York, New York
8:00 p.m. EDT	Sands (yellow card) 62'; Castellanos (yellow card) 75'	Report	Tolkin (yellow card) 13'; Fernandez 43'; Duncan (yellow card) 85'	Stadium: Yankee Stadium; Referee: Armando Villarreal

September 29 26	New York Red Bulls	1–1	Philadelphia Union	Harrison, New Jersey
7:30 p.m. EDT	Fernandez 37'; Duncan (yellow card) 52'; Reyes (yellow card) 65'	Report	Santos 17'; Martínez (yellow card) 45'; Wagner (yellow card) 85'; Blake (yellow card) 86'; Elliott (yellow card) 88'	Stadium: Red Bull Arena; Attendance: 9,193; Referee: Alex Chilowicz

October 2 27	FC Cincinnati	0–1	New York Red Bulls	Cincinnati, Ohio
7:30 p.m. EDT	Matarrita (yellow card) 90+1'; Acosta (yellow card) 90+3'	Report	Reyes (yellow card) 52'; Gutman 73'	Stadium: TQL Stadium; Referee: Timothy Ford

October 9 28	New York Red Bulls	1–0	Inter Miami CF	Harrison, New Jersey
6:00 PM EDT	Klimala 25'; Duncan (yellow card) 64'	Report	Guediri (yellow card) 74'	Stadium: Red Bull Arena; Attendance: 17,516; Referee: Tori Penso
Note: The match was originally scheduled on July 17 which was postponed due to inclement weather.

October 17 29	New York Red Bulls	1–0	New York City FC	Harrison, New Jersey
1:00 p.m. EDT	Cásseres 3'; Nealis (yellow card) 16'; Davis (yellow card) 21'	Report	Chanot (yellow card) 34'; Amundsen (yellow card) 82'	Stadium: Red Bull Arena; Attendance: 18,613; Referee: Jair Marrufo

October 23 30	Columbus Crew	1–2	New York Red Bulls	Columbus, Ohio
6:00 p.m. EDT	Berry 18'	Report	Cásseres Jr. 7'; Yearwood (yellow card) 70'; Nealis 87'	Stadium: Lower.com Field; Attendance: 17,891; Referee: Alan Kelly

October 27 31	D.C. United	1–0	New York Red Bulls	Washington, D.C.
8:00 p.m. EDT	Paredes 9'; Moreno (yellow card) 36'; Najar (yellow card) 64'	Report		Stadium: Audi Field; Attendance: 14,109; Referee: Rubiel Vazquez

October 30 32	New York Red Bulls	1–0	CF Montréal	Harrison, New Jersey
4:00 p.m. EDT	Reyes (yellow card) 81'; Fábio 90+1'	Report		Stadium: Red Bull Arena; Attendance: 16,344; Referee: Chris Penso

November 3 33	New York Red Bulls	0–0	Atlanta United FC	Harrison, New Jersey
7:30 p.m. EDT	Klimala (yellow card) 51'; Nealis (yellow card) 90+1'	Report	Luiz Araújo (yellow card) 11'; Walkes (yellow card) 90+1'	Stadium: Red Bull Arena; Attendance: 15,934; Referee: Alan Kelly

November 7 34	Nashville SC	1–1	New York Red Bulls	Nashville, Tennessee
3:30 p.m. EST	Mukhtar 37'; Godoy (yellow card) 76'	Report	Fábio 1'; Davis (yellow card) 14'; Diarra (yellow card) 86'	Stadium: Nissan Stadium; Attendance: 26,913; Referee: Drew Fischer

== MLS Cup Playoffs ==
November 20 First round	Philadelphia Union	1–0 (a.e.t.)	New York Red Bulls	Chester, Pennsylvania
1:30 p.m. EST	Martínez (yellow card) 74'; Glesnes 120+3'	Report	Yearwood (yellow card) 15'; Gutman (yellow card) 51'; Edwards (yellow card) 52'; Reyes (yellow card) 79'	Stadium: Subaru Park; Attendance: 18,623; Referee: Fotis Bazakos

== U.S. Open Cup ==
On April 16, US Soccer announced that the tournament would not be held in the spring due to a combination of financial and logistical issues, and that they were evaluating holding the tournament later in the year.

On July 20, US Soccer finally announced that the tournament would be cancelled for 2021 and would resume in 2022.

== Competitions summary ==
Competition	Record							
Competition	G	W	D	L	GF	GA	GD	Win %
MLS Regular Season	34	13	9	12	39	33	+6	38.24
MLS Cup Playoffs	1	0	0	1	0	1	−1	0.00
Total	35	13	9	13	39	34	+5	37.14

== Player statistics ==
As of November 20, 2021.

No.	Pos	Nat	Player	Total		MLS		Playoffs	
No.	Pos	Nat	Player	Apps	Goals	Apps	Goals	Apps	Goals
Goalkeepers
13	GK	(Brazil) BRA	Carlos Coronel	35	-34	34	-33	1	-1
18	GK	(United States) USA	Ryan Meara	0	0	0	0	0	0
88	GK	(United States) USA	Luca Lewis	0	0	0	0	0	0
Defenders
2	DF	(Uruguay) URU	Lucas Monzón	1	0	0+1	0	0	0
4	DF	(Colombia) COL	Andrés Reyes	20	2	17+2	2	1	0
5	DF	(United States) USA	Andrew Gutman	24	2	20+3	2	1	0
6	DF	(United States) USA	Kyle Duncan	32	1	26+5	1	1	0
7	DF	(England) ENG	Tom Edwards	28	0	25+2	0	1	0
15	DF	(United States) USA	Sean Nealis	29	1	28	1	1	0
20	DF	(France) FRA	Issiar Dramé	0	0	0	0	0	0
24	DF	(France) FRA	Jason Pendant	2	0	0+2	0	0	0
33	DF	(United States) USA	Aaron Long	5	0	5	0	0	0
39	DF	(England) ENG	Mandela Egbo	2	0	0+2	0	0	0
47	DF	(United States) USA	John Tolkin	29	1	22+6	1	0+1	0
Midfielders
8	MF	(United States) USA	Frankie Amaya	22	1	10+12	1	0	0
16	MF	(England) ENG	Dru Yearwood	30	1	18+11	1	1	0
17	MF	(United States) USA	Cameron Harper	7	0	0+7	0	0	0
19	MF	(Venezuela) VEN	Wikelman Carmona	25	1	15+10	1	0	0
21	MF	(United States) USA	Omir Fernandez	23	3	9+13	3	1	0
23	MF	(Venezuela) VEN	Cristian Cásseres	28	6	24+3	6	1	0
27	MF	(United States) USA	Sean Davis	35	0	34	0	1	0
37	MF	(United States) USA	Caden Clark	25	4	17+7	4	0+1	0
44	MF	(Mali) MLI	Youba Diarra	8	0	1+6	0	0+1	0
77	MF	(Austria) AUT	Daniel Royer	16	0	3+12	0	0+1	0
91	MF	(United States) USA	Bento Estrela	0	0	0	0	0	0
Forwards
9	FW	(Brazil) BRA	Fábio	31	7	25+5	7	1	0
10	FW	(Poland) POL	Patryk Klimala	31	8	27+3	8	0+1	0
67	FW	(The Gambia) GAM	Omar Sowe	1	0	0+1	0	0	0
74	FW	(United States) USA	Tom Barlow	23	1	4+19	1	0	0
Left Club During Season
1	GK	(Denmark) DEN	David Jensen	0	0	0	0	0	0
3	DF	(Egypt) EGY	Amro Tarek	13	0	10+3	0	0	0
22	MF	(France) FRA	Florian Valot	3	0	1+2	0	0	0
42	FW	(United States) USA	Brian White	5	0	3+2	0	0	0

=== Top scorers ===
Place	Position	Number	Name	MLS	Playoffs	Total
1	FW	10	(Poland) Patryk Klimala	8	0	8
2	FW	9	(Brazil) Fábio	7	0	7
3	MF	23	(Venezuela) Cristian Cásseres	6	0	6
4	MF	37	(United States) Caden Clark	4	0	4
5	MF	21	(United States) Omir Fernandez	3	0	3
6	DF	4	(Colombia) Andrés Reyes	2	0	2
6	DF	5	(United States) Andrew Gutman	2	0	2
7	DF	6	(United States) Kyle Duncan	1	0	1
7	MF	8	(United States) Frankie Amaya	1	0	1
7	DF	15	(United States) Sean Nealis	1	0	1
7	MF	16	(England) Dru Yearwood	1	0	1
7	MF	19	(Venezuela) Wikelman Carmona	1	0	1
7	DF	47	(United States) John Tolkin	1	0	1
7	FW	74	(United States) Tom Barlow	1	0	1
Total				39	0	39

As of November 20, 2021.

=== Assist Leaders ===
Place	Position	Number	Name	MLS	Playoffs	Total
1	FW	9	(Brazil) Fábio	6	0	6
1	FW	10	(Poland) Patryk Klimala	6	0	6
2	DF	6	(United States) Kyle Duncan	3	0	3
2	MF	23	(Venezuela) Cristian Cásseres	3	0	3
2	MF	37	(United States) Caden Clark	3	0	3
3	DF	7	(England) Tom Edwards	2	0	2
4	DF	4	(Colombia) Andrés Reyes	1	0	1
4	DF	5	(England) Andrew Gutman	1	0	1
4	MF	8	(United States) Frankie Amaya	1	0	1
4	MF	16	(England) Dru Yearwood	1	0	1
4	MF	19	(Venezuela) Wikelman Carmona	1	0	1
4	FW	42	(United States) Brian White	1	0	1
4	DF	47	(United States) John Tolkin	1	0	1
Total				30	0	30

As of November 20, 2021.
This table does not include secondary assists.

=== Shutouts ===
Place	Position	Number	Name	MLS	Playoffs	Total
1	GK	1	(Brazil) Carlos Coronel	13	0	13
Total				13	0	13

As of November 20, 2021.

=== Disciplinary record ===
No.	Pos.	Nat.	Player	MLS		Playoffs		Total	
No.	Pos.	Nat.	Player	Booked	Sent off (straight red)	Booked	Sent off (straight red)	Booked	Sent off (straight red)
1	GK	(Brazil)	Carlos Coronel	1	0	0	0	1	0
3	DF	(Egypt)	Amro Tarek	4	0	0	0	4	0
4	DF	(Colombia)	Andrés Reyes	7	1	1	0	7	1
5	MF	(United States)	Andrew Gutman	2	0	1	0	2	0
6	DF	(United States)	Kyle Duncan	10	0	0	0	10	0
7	DF	(England)	Tom Edwards	6	0	1	0	6	0
8	MF	(United States)	Frankie Amaya	1	0	0	0	1	0
9	FW	(Brazil)	Fábio	3	0	0	0	3	0
10	FW	(Poland)	Patryk Klimala	6	0	0	0	6	0
15	DF	(United States)	Sean Nealis	4	0	0	0	4	0
16	MF	(England)	Dru Yearwood	8	1	1	0	8	1
17	MF	(United States)	Cameron Harper	1	0	0	0	1	0
23	MF	(Venezuela)	Cristian Cásseres	3	0	0	0	3	0
27	MF	(United States)	Sean Davis	7	0	0	0	7	0
33	DF	(United States)	Aaron Long	1	0	0	0	1	0
37	MF	(United States)	Caden Clark	3	0	0	0	3	0
44	MF	(Mali)	Youba Diarra	2	0	0	0	2	0
47	DF	(United States)	John Tolkin	2	0	0	0	2	0
74	FW	(United States)	Tom Barlow	2	0	0	0	2	0
Totals				73	2	4	0	77	2

As of November 20, 2021.
