= List of Major League Soccer transfers 2021 =

The following is a list of transfers for the 2021 Major League Soccer (MLS) season that were made during the 2020–21 MLS offseason all the way through to the roster freeze.

== Transfers ==
List of 2021 MLS transfers
Date	Name	Moving from	Moving to	Mode of Transfer	
November 13, 2020	(Nigeria) Chinonso Offor	(Latvia) FK RFS	Chicago Fire	Transfer	
November 19, 2020	(United States) Andres Jasson	(United States) Yale Bulldogs	New York City FC	Homegrown player	
November 19, 2020	(England) Cameron Lancaster	Nashville SC	(United States) Louisville City	Transfer	
November 23, 2020	(Ecuador) Jhon Espinoza	(Ecuador) S.D. Aucas	Chicago Fire	Transfer	
November 25, 2020	(Chile) Pablo Aránguiz	FC Dallas	Universidad de Chile	Transfer	
November 25, 2020	(United States) Jacob Greene	(United States) Loudoun United	D.C. United	Homegrown player	
December 1, 2020	(Canada) Zorhan Bassong	(Belgium) Cercle Brugge	CF Montréal	Free	
December 1, 2020	(Brazil) Antônio Carlos	(Brazil) Palmeiras	Orlando City SC	Transfer	
December 1, 2020	(Costa Rica) Ariel Lassiter	(Costa Rica) Alajuelense	Houston Dynamo	Transfer	
December 2, 2020	(Ecuador) Alexander Alvarado	(Ecuador) S.D. Aucas	Orlando City SC	Transfer	
December 2, 2020	(United States) Andrés Perea	(Colombia) Atlético Nacional	Orlando City SC	Transfer	
December 2, 2020	(Argentina) Rodrigo Schlegel	(Argentina) Racing Club	Orlando City SC	Transfer	
December 3, 2020	(United States) Jackson Conway	(United States) Atlanta United 2	Atlanta United FC	Homegrown player	
December 4, 2020	(Canada) Jean-Aniel Assi	(Canada) Montreal Impact Academy	CF Montréal	Homegrown player	
December 4, 2020	(Netherlands) Siem de Jong	FC Cincinnati	(Netherlands) SC Heerenveen	Free	
December 4, 2020	(Canada) Sean Rea	(Canada) Montreal Impact Academy	CF Montréal	Homegrown player	
December 4, 2020	(Canada) Nathan Saliba	(Canada) Montreal Impact Academy	CF Montréal	Homegrown player	
December 4, 2020	(Canada) Rida Zouhir	(Canada) Montreal Impact Academy	CF Montréal	Homegrown player	
December 7, 2020	(United States) Evan Newton	(United States) Indy Eleven	New York City FC	Loan	
December 8, 2020	(Denmark) Mathias Jørgensen	New York Red Bulls	(Denmark) AGF	Loan	
December 8, 2020	(Colombia) Mauro Manotas	Houston Dynamo	(Mexico) Club Tijuana	Transfer	
December 9, 2020	(Bulgaria) Stanislav Ivanov	(Bulgaria) Levski Sofia	Chicago Fire	Transfer	
December 11, 2020	(United States) Luca Lewis	(United States) New York Red Bulls II	New York Red Bulls	Free	
December 13, 2020	(United States) Evan Bush	Vancouver Whitecaps FC	Columbus Crew	Trade	
December 13, 2020	(Costa Rica) Julio Cascante	Portland Timbers	Austin FC	Trade	
December 13, 2020	(United States) Marco Farfan	Portland Timbers	Los Angeles FC	Trade	
December 13, 2020	(Republic of Ireland) Jon Gallagher	Atlanta United FC	Austin FC	Trade	
December 13, 2020	(United States) Nick Lima	San Jose Earthquakes	Austin FC	Trade	
December 13, 2020	(Canada) Callum Montgomery	FC Dallas	Minnesota United FC	Trade	
December 13, 2020	(Costa Rica) Ulises Segura	D.C. United	Austin FC	Trade	
December 13, 2020	(United States) Ben Sweat	Inter Miami CF	Austin FC	Trade	
December 16, 2020	(United States) Joe Corona	LA Galaxy	Austin FC	Expansion Draft	
December 16, 2020	(Netherlands) Danny Hoesen	San Jose Earthquakes	Austin FC	Expansion Draft	
December 16, 2020	(Canada) Kamal Miller	Orlando City SC	Austin FC	Expansion Draft	
December 16, 2020	(Canada) Kamal Miller	Austin FC	CF Montréal	Trade	
December 16, 2020	(United States) Brady Scott	Nashville SC	Austin FC	Expansion Draft	
December 16, 2020	(United States) Jared Stroud	New York Red Bulls	Austin FC	Expansion Draft	
December 17, 2020	(Argentina) Claudio Bravo	(Argentina) Banfield	Portland Timbers	Transfer	
December 17, 2020	(Canada) Raheem Edwards	Minnesota United FC	Los Angeles FC	Re-Entry Draft	
December 17, 2020	(United States) Andrew Gutman	FC Cincinnati	Atlanta United FC	Re-Entry Draft	
December 17, 2020	(United States) Kendall McIntosh	New York Red Bulls	Sporting Kansas City	Re-Entry Draft	
December 17, 2020	(United States) Djordje Mihailovic	Chicago Fire	CF Montréal	Trade	
December 17, 2020	(United States) Fafà Picault	FC Dallas	Houston Dynamo	Trade	
December 17, 2020	(Finland) Alexander Ring	New York City FC	Austin FC	Trade	
December 18, 2020	(United States) Brandt Bronico	Chicago Fire	Charlotte FC	Trade	
December 18, 2020	(United States) Felipe Valencia	(United States) Inter Miami Academy	Inter Miami CF	Homegrown player	
December 19, 2020	(United States) Earl Edwards Jr.	D.C. United	New England Revolution	Free	
December 21, 2020	(United States) Hector Jiménez	Columbus Crew	Austin FC	Free	
December 21, 2020	(Colombia) Christian Mafla	(Colombia) Atlético Nacional	New England Revolution	Transfer	
December 21, 2020	(Spain) José Martínez	(Spain) SD Eibar	FC Dallas	Transfer	
December 22, 2020	(United States) Mikey Ambrose	Inter Miami CF	Atlanta United FC	Free	
December 22, 2020	(United States) Joe Corona	Austin FC	Houston Dynamo	Re-Entry Draft	
December 22, 2020	(United States) Eric Dick	Sporting Kansas City	Columbus Crew	Re-Entry Draft	
December 22, 2020	(Colombia) Jáder Obrian	(Colombia) Rionegro Águilas	FC Dallas	Transfer	
December 22, 2020	(United States) Adrien Perez	Los Angeles FC	D.C. United	Re-Entry Draft	
December 22, 2020	(Colombia) Jhohan Romaña	(Paraguay) Guaraní	Austin FC	Transfer	
December 22, 2020	(France) Rémi Walter	(Turkey) Yeni Malatyaspor	Sporting Kansas City	Free	
December 23, 2020	(Venezuela) Rolf Feltscher	LA Galaxy	(Germany) Würzburger Kickers	Free	
December 23, 2020	(Cameroon) Wilfrid Kaptoum	(Spain) Real Betis	New England Revolution	Free	
December 23, 2020	(United States) Patrick Seagrist	New York Red Bulls	Inter Miami CF	Trade	
December 23, 2020	(United States) Andrew Tarbell	Columbus Crew	Austin FC	Free	
December 23, 2020	(England) Bradley Wright-Phillips	Los Angeles FC	Columbus Crew	Free	
December 26, 2020	(United States) Lee Nguyen	New England Revolution	(Vietnam) Ho Chi Minh City FC	Free	
December 28, 2020	(United States) Brad Stuver	New York City FC	Austin FC	Free	
December 29, 2020	(Costa Rica) Rónald Matarrita	New York City FC	FC Cincinnati	Trade	
December 30, 2020	(United States) Cody Cropper	Houston Dynamo	FC Cincinnati	Free	
December 30, 2020	(United States) Ben Mines	New York Red Bulls	FC Cincinnati	Waiver Draft	
January 1, 2021	(United States) Brenden Aaronson	Philadelphia Union	(Austria) Red Bull Salzburg	Transfer	
January 1, 2021	(Paraguay) Erik López	(Paraguay) Olimpia	Atlanta United FC	Transfer	
January 1, 2021	(United States) Efrain Morales	(United States) Atlanta United 2	Atlanta United FC	Homegrown player	
January 1, 2021	(United States) Joseph Scally	New York City FC	(Germany) Borussia Mönchengladbach	Transfer	
January 4, 2021	(Canada) Shamit Shome	CF Montréal	(Canada) FC Edmonton	Free	
January 5, 2021	(Uruguay) Diego Fagúndez	New England Revolution	Austin FC	Free	
January 5, 2021	(United States) Wil Trapp	Inter Miami CF	Minnesota United FC	Free	
January 6, 2021	(United States) Matt Besler	Sporting Kansas City	Austin FC	Free	
January 6, 2021	(Colombia) Santiago Patiño	Orlando City SC	(United States) San Antonio FC	Free	
January 7, 2021	(Ghana) Emmanuel Boateng	Columbus Crew	New England Revolution	Free	
January 7, 2021	(Guam) A. J. DeLaGarza	Inter Miami CF	New England Revolution	Free	
January 7, 2021	(United States) Mark McKenzie	Philadelphia Union	(Belgium) Genk	Transfer	
January 7, 2021	(Trinidad and Tobago) Kevin Molino	Minnesota United FC	Columbus Crew	Free	
January 7, 2021	(United States) Rubio Rubin	(United States) San Diego Loyal	Real Salt Lake	Free	
January 7, 2021	(Norway) Jørgen Skjelvik	LA Galaxy	(Denmark) OB	Transfer	
January 8, 2021	(United States) Jon Kempin	Columbus Crew	D.C. United	Trade	
January 9, 2021	(New Zealand) Kyle Adams	Houston Dynamo	(United States) Real Monarchs	Free	
January 9, 2021	(Scotland) Gary Mackay-Steven	New York City FC	(Scotland) Heart of Midlothian	Free	
January 11, 2021	(United States) Corey Baird	Real Salt Lake	Los Angeles FC	Trade	
January 11, 2021	(Colombia) Jhon Durán	(Colombia) Envigado	Chicago Fire	Free	
January 11, 2021	(South Korea) Kim Moon-hwan	(South Korea) Busan IPark	Los Angeles FC	Transfer	
January 11, 2021	(United States) Isaiah Parente	(United States) Wake Forest Demon Deacons	Columbus Crew	Homegrown player	
January 12, 2021	(United States) Jeff Dewsnup	(United States) Real Salt Lake Academy	Real Salt Lake	Homegrown player	
January 12, 2021	(Nigeria) Sunusi Ibrahim	(Nigeria) 36 Lion FC	CF Montréal	Transfer	
January 12, 2021	(United States) Jorge Villafaña	Portland Timbers	LA Galaxy	Trade	
January 13, 2021	(Colombia) Michael Barrios	FC Dallas	Colorado Rapids	Trade	
January 13, 2021	January 14, 2021	(England) Jonathan Bond	(England) West Bromwich Albion	LA Galaxy	Transfer
(United States) Kalil ElMedkhar	January 14, 2021	Philadelphia Union	FC Dallas	Homegrown player	
(United States) Jerome Kiesewetter	January 14, 2021	Inter Miami CF	(United States) FC Tulsa	Free	
(United States) Chris Lema	January 14, 2021	New York Red Bulls	(United States) San Antonio FC	Free	
(Canada) Tyler Pasher	January 14, 2021	(United States) Indy Eleven	Houston Dynamo	Transfer	
(New Zealand) Deklan Wynne	January 14, 2021	Colorado Rapids	(United States) Phoenix Rising	Free	
January 15, 2021	(Scotland) Chris Cadden	Columbus Crew	(Scotland) Hibernian	Transfer	
January 15, 2021	(United States) Justin Dhillon	Seattle Sounders FC	(United States) San Antonio FC	Free	
January 15, 2021	(Venezuela) Freddy Vargas	(Venezuela) Deportivo Lara	FC Dallas	Loan	
January 15, 2021	(Costa Rica) Kendall Waston	FC Cincinnati	(Costa Rica) Saprissa	Free	
January 18, 2021	(Slovenia) Aljaž Struna	Houston Dynamo	CF Montréal	Trade	
January 18, 2021	(Argentina) Maximiliano Urruti	CF Montréal	Houston Dynamo	Trade	
January 19, 2021	(Sudan) Machop Chol	(United States) Wake Forest Demon Deacons	Atlanta United FC	Homegrown player	
January 19, 2021	(Chile) Felipe Mora	(Mexico) UNAM	Portland Timbers	Transfer	
January 19, 2021	(United States) Tim Parker	New York Red Bulls	Houston Dynamo	Trade	
January 19, 2021	(Colombia) Andrés Reyes	(Colombia) Atlético Nacional	New York Red Bulls	Transfer	
January 19, 2021	(United States) Adam Saldana	(United States) LA Galaxy II	LA Galaxy	Homegrown player	
January 20, 2021	(United States) Grayson Barber	(United States) Clemson Tigers	Sporting Kansas City	Homegrown player	
January 20, 2021	(United States) Ozzie Cisneros	(United States) Sporting Kansas City Academy	Sporting Kansas City	Homegrown player	
January 20, 2021	(Mexico) Javier López	(Mexico) Guadalajara	San Jose Earthquakes	Loan	
January 20, 2021	(United States) Jalen Neal	(United States) LA Galaxy II	LA Galaxy	Homegrown player	
January 20, 2021	(United States) Brooks Thompson	(United States) Sporting Kansas City II	Sporting Kansas City	Homegrown player	
January 20, 2021	(United States) Andrew Wooten	Philadelphia Union	(Austria) Admira Wacher	Free	
January 21, 2021	(United States) Ethan Bartlow	(United States) Washington Huskies	Houston Dynamo	SuperDraft	
January 21, 2021	(United States) Bret Halsey	(United States) Virginia Cavaliers	Real Salt Lake	SuperDraft	
January 21, 2021	(England) Calvin Harris	(United States) Wake Forest Demon Deacons	FC Cincinnati	SuperDraft	
January 21, 2021	(United States) Derrick Jones	Nashville SC	Houston Dynamo	Trade	
January 21, 2021	(Kenya) Philip Mayaka	(United States) Clemson Tigers	Colorado Rapids	SuperDraft	
January 21, 2021	(Brazil) João Paulo	(Brazil) Botafogo	Seattle Sounders FC	Transfer	
January 21, 2021	(Venezuela) Daniel Pereira	(United States) Virginia Tech Hokies	Austin FC	SuperDraft	
January 22, 2021	(England) Brandon Austin	(England) Tottenham Hotspur Under-23	Orlando City SC	Loan	
January 22, 2021	(United States) Marcus Ferkranus	(United States) LA Galaxy II	LA Galaxy	Homegrown player	
January 22, 2021	(The Gambia) Kekuta Manneh	New England Revolution	Austin FC	Free	
January 22, 2021	(United States) Jordan Morris	Seattle Sounders FC	(Wales) Swansea City	Loan	
January 22, 2021	(Colombia) Jesús David Murillo	(Colombia) Independiente Medellín	Los Angeles FC	Transfer	
January 22, 2021	(Colombia) Miguel Nazarit	Nashville SC	(Colombia) Santa Fe	Loan	
January 24, 2021	(Rwanda) Abdul Rwatubyaye	Colorado Rapids	(North Macedonia) KF Shkupi	Free	
January 24, 2021	(Panama) Román Torres	Seattle Sounders FC	(Costa Rica) Cartaginés	Free	
January 25, 2021	(Venezuela) Wikelman Carmona	(Venezuela) Dynamo Margarita	New York Red Bulls	Transfer	
January 25, 2021	(Argentina) Lisandro López	(Argentina) Racing Club	Atlanta United FC	Free	
January 26, 2021	(Dominican Republic) Edison Azcona	(United States) Fort Lauderdale CF	Inter Miami CF	Homegrown player	
January 26, 2021	(Colombia) Déiber Caicedo	(Colombia) Deportivo Cali	Vancouver Whitecaps FC	Transfer	
January 26, 2021	(United States) Ian Fray	(United States) Fort Lauderdale CF	Inter Miami CF	Homegrown player	
January 26, 2021	(Morocco) Youness Mokhtar	Columbus Crew	(Netherlands) ADO Den Haag	Free	
January 26, 2021	(Jamaica) Alvas Powell	Inter Miami CF	(Sudan) Al-Hilal	Free	
January 27, 2021	(United States) Jeff Caldwell	New England Revolution	(United States) Hartford Athletic	Free	
January 27, 2021	(United States) Dylan Castanheira	(United States) Fort Lauderdale CF	Inter Miami CF	Free	
January 27, 2021	(England) Tom Edwards	(England) Stoke City	New York Red Bulls	Loan	
January 27, 2021	(United States) Kyle Morton	(United States) Saint Louis FC	Houston Dynamo	Free	
January 28, 2021	(Ghana) David Accam	Nashville SC	(Sweden) Hammarby IF	Loan	
January 28, 2021	(Jamaica) Andrew Booth	Minnesota United FC	CF Montréal	Trade	
January 28, 2021	(Paraguay) Josué Colmán	Orlando City SC	(Paraguay) Guaraní	Free	
January 28, 2021	(Slovenia) Antonio Delamea	New England Revolution	(Slovenia) Olimpija Ljubljana	Free	
January 28, 2021	(United States) Perry Kitchen	LA Galaxy	Columbus Crew	Free	
January 28, 2021	(Finland) Jukka Raitala	CF Montréal	Minnesota United FC	Trade	
January 29, 2021	(United States) Luis Felipe	San Jose Earthquakes	(United States) Sacramento Republic	Free	
January 29, 2021	(United States) Evan Newton	(United States) Indy Eleven	Vancouver Whitecaps FC	Transfer	
January 29, 2021	(United States) Kelyn Rowe	New England Revolution	Seattle Sounders FC	Free	
January 30, 2021	(Argentina) Tomás Martínez	Houston Dynamo	(Argentina) Defensa y Justicia	Free	
February 1, 2021	(United States) Paul Arriola	D.C. United	(Wales) Swansea City	Loan	
February 1, 2021	(Uganda) Micheal Azira	Chicago Fire	(United States) New Mexico United	Free	
February 1, 2021	(United States) Daryl Dike	Orlando City SC	(England) Barnsley	Loan	
February 1, 2021	(Nigeria) David Egbo	(United States) Akron Zips	Vancouver Whitecaps FC	SuperDraft	
February 1, 2021	(United States) Bryan Reynolds	FC Dallas	(Italy) Roma	Loan	
February 1, 2021	(Brazil) Robinho	Orlando City SC	(Brazil) Confiança	Free	
February 1, 2021	(Uruguay) Brian Rodríguez	Los Angeles FC	(Spain) Almería	Loan	
February 1, 2021	(El Salvador) Tomas Romero	Philadelphia Union	Los Angeles FC	Homegrown player	
February 2, 2021	(United States) Spencer Richey	FC Cincinnati	Seattle Sounders FC	Free	
February 2, 2021	(United States) William Yarbrough	(Mexico) León	Colorado Rapids	Transfer	
February 3, 2021	(Canada) Keesean Ferdinand	CF Montréal	(Canada) Atlético Ottawa	Loan	
February 3, 2021	(France) Nicolas Isimat-Mirin	(Turkey) Beşiktaş	Sporting Kansas City	Free	
February 3, 2021	(Norway) Bjørn Johnsen	(South Korea) Ulsan Hyundai	CF Montréal	Transfer	
February 3, 2021	(Uruguay) Rodrigo Piñeiro	(Uruguay) Danubio	Nashville SC	Transfer	
February 3, 2021	(United States) Jonathan Suárez	(Mexico) Querétaro	Orlando City SC	Loan	
February 3, 2021	(Mexico) Josecarlos Van Rankin	(Mexico) Guadalajara	Portland Timbers	Loan	
February 3, 2021	(Canada) Karifa Yao	CF Montréal	(Canada) Cavalry FC	Loan	
February 4, 2021	(Cuba) Jorge Corrales	CF Montréal	(United States) FC Tulsa	Free	
February 4, 2021	(Egypt) Ahmed Hamdy	(Egypt) El Gouna	CF Montréal	Loan	
February 4, 2021	(United States) Aaron Schoenfeld	Minnesota United FC	Austin FC	Free	
February 4, 2021	(Argentina) Joaquín Torres	(Argentina) Newell's Old Boys	CF Montréal	Loan	
February 5, 2021	(Brazil) Brenner	(Brazil) São Paulo	FC Cincinnati	Transfer	
February 5, 2021	(United States) Michael DeShields	(United States) Wake Forest Demon Deacons	D.C. United	SuperDraft	
February 5, 2021	(Brazil) Fábio	(Brazil) Oeste	New York Red Bulls	Loan	
February 9, 2021	(United States) Alex DeJohn	Orlando City SC	(United States) Pittsburgh Riverhounds	Free	
February 9, 2021	(Argentina) Franco Escobar	Atlanta United FC	(Argentina) Newell's Old Boys	Loan	
February 9, 2021	(United States) Bento Estrela	(United States) New York Red Bulls Academy	New York Red Bulls	Homegrown player	
February 9, 2021	(United States) Freddy Kleemann	(United States) Washington Huskies	Austin FC	SuperDraft	
February 9, 2021	(United States) Brandon Servania	FC Dallas	(Austria) SKN St. Pölten	Loan	
February 10, 2021	(England) Michael Mancienne	New England Revolution	(England) Burton Albion	Free	
February 10, 2021	(United States) Tommy McCabe	FC Cincinnati	(United States) Orange County SC	Free	
February 10, 2021	(United States) C. J. Sapong	Chicago Fire	Nashville SC	Free	
February 11, 2021	(Argentina) Tomás Pochettino	(Argentina) Talleres	Austin FC	Transfer	
February 12, 2021	(Denmark) Malte Amundsen	(Denmark) Vejle BK	New York City FC	Transfer	
February 12, 2021	(United States) Justin Che	FC Dallas	(Germany) Bayern Munich II	Loan	
February 12, 2021	(Canada) Tomas Giraldo	CF Montréal	(Canada) FC Edmonton	Loan	
February 12, 2021	(United States) Josh Penn	(United States) Indiana Hoosiers	Inter Miami CF	SuperDraft	
February 12, 2021	(Argentina) Santiago Sosa	(Argentina) River Plate	Atlanta United FC	Transfer	
February 13, 2021	(Brazil) Alexandre Pato	(Brazil) São Paulo	Orlando City SC	Free	
February 15, 2021	(Jamaica) Oniel Fisher	D.C. United	LA Galaxy	Free	
February 15, 2021	(Argentina) Eric Remedi	Atlanta United FC	San Jose Earthquakes	Trade	
February 16, 2021	(United States) Erik Hurtado	Sporting Kansas City	CF Montréal	Free	
February 16, 2021	(Argentina) Emiliano Insúa	LA Galaxy	(Argentina) Aldosivi	Free	
February 16, 2021	(United States) Benji Kikanovic	(United States) Reno 1868	San Jose Earthquakes	Free	
February 16, 2021	(Guinea-Bissau) Gerso Fernandes	Sporting Kansas City	(South Korea) Jeju United	Free	
February 16, 2021	(Georgia (country)) Valeri Qazaishvili	San Jose Earthquakes	(South Korea) Ulsan Hyundai	Free	
February 16, 2021	(Poland) Jan Sobociński	(Poland) ŁKS Łódź	Charlotte FC	Transfer	
February 16, 2021	(United States) D.J. Taylor	(United States) North Carolina FC	Minnesota United FC	Free	
February 17, 2021	(Argentina) Luciano Abecasis	(Paraguay) Libertad	San Jose Earthquakes	Transfer	
February 17, 2021	(Jamaica) Javain Brown	(United States) South Florida Bulls	Vancouver Whitecaps FC	SuperDraft	
February 17, 2021	(United States) Robert Castellanos	(United States) Rio Grande Valley FC Toros	Nashville SC	Free	
February 17, 2021	(Panama) Carlos Harvey	(Panama) Tauro F.C.	LA Galaxy	Transfer	
February 18, 2021	(Venezuela) Ronald Hernández	(Scotland) Aberdeen	Atlanta United FC	Loan	
February 18, 2021	(Argentina) Fernando Meza	Atlanta United FC	(Argentina) Defensa y Justicia	Loan	
February 20, 2021	(England) Ryan Shawcross	(England) Stoke City	Inter Miami CF	Transfer	
February 22, 2021	(United States) Nick Hinds	Seattle Sounders FC	Nashville SC	Trade	
February 22, 2021	(Argentina) Franco Ibarra	(Argentina) Argentinos Juniors	Atlanta United FC	Transfer	
February 22, 2021	(United States) Adam Jahn	Atlanta United FC	(United States) Orange County SC	Loan	
February 23, 2021	(Netherlands) Silvester van der Water	(Netherlands) Heracles Almelo	Orlando City SC	Transfer	
February 24, 2021	(Brazil) Gregore	(Brazil) Bahia	Inter Miami CF	Transfer	
February 24, 2021	(Sweden) Erik McCue	Houston Dynamo	(United States) Charleston Battery	Loan	
February 24, 2021	(United States) Bryan Meredith	Vancouver Whitecaps FC	Nashville SC	Free	
February 25, 2021	(Scotland) Stuart Findlay	(Scotland) Kilmarnock	Philadelphia Union	Transfer	
February 25, 2021	(Venezuela) Gelmin Rivas	D.C. United	(Iraq) Al-Shorta SC	Free	
February 25, 2021	(Switzerland) Reto Ziegler	FC Dallas	(Switzerland) FC Lugano	Free	
February 26, 2021	(Brazil) Carlos Miguel Coronel	(Austria) Red Bull Salzburg	New York Red Bulls	Loan	
March 1, 2021	(Mali) Youba Diarra	(Austria) Red Bull Salzburg	New York Red Bulls	Loan	
March 1, 2021	(Canada) Jordan Hamilton	Columbus Crew	(United States) Indy Eleven	Free	
March 1, 2021	(United States) Wan Kuzain	Sporting Kansas City	(United States) Rio Grande Valley FC Toros	Free	
March 2, 2021	(United States) Juan Agudelo	Inter Miami CF	Minnesota United FC	Free	
March 2, 2021	(Canada) David Norman Jr.	Inter Miami CF	(Canada) Cavalry FC	Free	
March 3, 2021	(United States) Sebastian Berhalter	Columbus Crew	Austin FC	Loan	
March 3, 2021	(United States) Marlon Hairston	Minnesota United FC	Columbus Crew	Free	
March 3, 2021	(Georgia (country)) Guram Kashia	San Jose Earthquakes	(Georgia (country)) Locomotive Tbilisi	Free	
March 3, 2021	(Slovenia) Žan Kolmanič	(Slovenia) Maribor	Austin FC	Loan	
March 3, 2021	(United States) Oliver Larraz	(United States) Colorado Rapids Academy	Colorado Rapids	Homegrown player	
March 3, 2021	(United States) Marcelo Palomino	Houston Dynamo	(United States) Charlotte Independence	Loan	
March 3, 2021	(United States) Darren Yapi	(United States) Colorado Rapids Academy	Colorado Rapids	Homegrown player	
March 4, 2021	(United States) Michael Edwards	(Germany) VfL Wolfsburg II	Colorado Rapids	Homegrown player	
March 4, 2021	(United States) Ben Lundgaard	(United States) Atlanta United 2	Atlanta United FC	Free	
March 4, 2021	(United States) Cody Mizell	(United States) New Mexico United	New York City FC	Transfer	
March 4, 2021	(Colombia) Fredy Montero	Vancouver Whitecaps FC	Seattle Sounders FC	Free	
March 4, 2021	(Guinea) Dantouma Toure	(United States) New York Red Bulls II	Colorado Rapids	Homegrown player	
March 4, 2021	(United States) Patrick Weah	(United States) Minnesota United Academy	Minnesota United FC	Homegrown player	
March 4, 2021	(Republic of Ireland) Derrick Williams	(England) Blackburn Rovers	LA Galaxy	Transfer	
March 5, 2021	(United States) Cameron Harper	(Scotland) Celtic	New York Red Bulls	Transfer	
March 5, 2021	(Uganda) Edward Kizza	(United States) Pittsburgh Panthers	New England Revolution	SuperDraft	
March 5, 2021	(New Zealand) James Musa	Minnesota United FC	(United States) Phoenix Rising	Free	
March 6, 2021	(Argentina) Pablo Piatti	Toronto FC	(Spain) Elche	Free	
March 8, 2021	(United States) Brendan Hines-Ike	(Belgium) KV Kortrijk	D.C. United	Loan	
March 8, 2021	(Romania) Alexandru Mățan	(Romania) Viitorul Constanța	Columbus Crew	Transfer	
March 8, 2021	(England) Kimarni Smith	(United States) Clemson Tigers	D.C. United	SuperDraft	
March 8, 2021	(United States) Juan Pablo Torres	New York City FC	(United States) Austin Bold FC	Loan	
March 9, 2021	(Venezuela) Jovanny Bolívar	(Venezuela) Deportivo La Guaira	D.C. United	Loan	
March 9, 2021	(Angola) Bruno Gaspar	(Portugal) Sporting CP	Vancouver Whitecaps FC	Loan	
March 9, 2021	(United States) Andrew Gutman	Atlanta United FC	New York Red Bulls	Loan	
March 9, 2021	(United States) Cal Jennings	(United States) Indy Eleven	Los Angeles FC	Transfer	
March 10, 2021	(Argentina) Luciano Acosta	(Mexico) Atlas	FC Cincinnati	Transfer	
March 11, 2021	(France) Samuel Grandsir	Monaco	LA Galaxy	Transfer	
March 11, 2021	(Trinidad and Tobago) Joevin Jones	Seattle Sounders FC	Inter Miami CF	Free	
March 12, 2021	(Brazil) Caio Alexandre	(Brazil) Botafogo	Vancouver Whitecaps FC	Transfer	
March 12, 2021	(United States) Alex DeJohn	(United States) Pittsburgh Riverhounds	Atlanta United FC	Free	
March 12, 2021	(Ecuador) Anderson Julio	(Mexico) Atlético San Luis	Real Salt Lake	Loan	
March 16, 2021	(Iceland) Arnór Ingvi Traustason	(Sweden) Malmö	New England Revolution	Transfer	
March 17, 2021	(Spain) Víctor Vázquez	(Belgium) Eupen	LA Galaxy	Free	
March 18, 2021	(Denmark) Niko Hansen	Houston Dynamo	Minnesota United FC	Trade	
March 19, 2021	(Chile) Felipe Gutiérrez	Sporting Kansas City	(Chile) Universidad Católica	Free	
March 22, 2021	(United States) Jon Bell	(United States) New England Revolution II	New England Revolution	Free	
March 22, 2021	(United States) Chris Gloster	(Netherlands) Jong PSV	New York City FC	Free	
March 22, 2021	(Brazil) Maciel	(United States) New England Revolution II	New England Revolution	Free	
March 22, 2021	(Puerto Rico) Wilfredo Rivera	(United States) Orlando City B	Orlando City SC	Homegrown player	
March 23, 2021	(United States) Nicky Hernandez	(United States) SMU Mustangs	FC Dallas	SuperDraft	
March 23, 2021	(Suriname) Kelvin Leerdam	Seattle Sounders FC	Inter Miami CF	Free	
March 23, 2021	(Netherlands) Nigel Robertha	(Bulgaria) Levski Sofia	D.C. United	Transfer	
March 24, 2021	(United States) Fatai Alashe	Columbus Crew	(United States) Sacramento Republic	Free	
March 24, 2021	(United States) Jeremy Kelly	Colorado Rapids	(United States) Phoenix Rising	Loan	
March 24, 2021	(United States) Andre Rawls	Colorado Rapids	(United States) Phoenix Rising	Loan	
March 26, 2021	(Tunisia) Jasser Khmiri	Vancouver Whitecaps FC	(United States) San Antonio FC	Loan	
March 29, 2021	(United States) Sebastian Anderson	Colorado Rapids	(United States) Colorado Springs Switchbacks	Loan	
March 29, 2021	(United States) Michael Edwards	Colorado Rapids	(United States) Colorado Springs Switchbacks	Loan	
March 29, 2021	(United States) Matt Hundley	Colorado Rapids	(United States) Colorado Springs Switchbacks	Loan	
March 29, 2021	(Kenya) Philip Mayaka	Colorado Rapids	(United States) Colorado Springs Switchbacks	Loan	
March 29, 2021	(United States) Abraham Rodriguez	Colorado Rapids	(United States) Colorado Springs Switchbacks	Loan	
March 31, 2021	(Ghana) Isaac Atanga	(Denmark) Nordsjælland	FC Cincinnati	Transfer	
March 31, 2021	(United States) Leon Flach	(Germany) FC St. Pauli	Philadelphia Union	Transfer	
March 31, 2021	(England) Laurence Wyke	Atlanta United FC	(United States) Tampa Bay Rowdies	Free	
April 1, 2021	(Brazil) Thiago Santos	FC Dallas	(Brazil) Grêmio	Transfer	
April 2, 2021	(Uruguay) Thomás Chacón	Minnesota United FC	(Uruguay) Liverpool	Loan	
April 2, 2021	(Spain) Jorge Gonzalez	(United States) Portland Timbers 2	Portland Timbers	Free	
April 2, 2021	(Spain) Jorge Gonzalez	Portland Timbers	(United States) Louisville City	Loan	
April 2, 2021	(The Gambia) Ismaila Jome	(United States) Austin Bold	Portland Timbers	Free	
April 2, 2021	(Trinidad and Tobago) Greg Ranjitsingh	Minnesota United FC	Philadelphia Union	Free	
April 3, 2021	(Jamaica) Justin McMaster	(United States) Wake Forest Demon Deacons	Minnesota United FC	SuperDraft	
April 3, 2021	(United States) Nabilai Kibunguchy	(United States) UC Davis Aggies	Minnesota United FC	SuperDraft	
April 5, 2021	(United States) Raul Aguilera	(United States) Orlando City B	Orlando City SC	Homegrown player	
April 5, 2021	(England) Jack Gurr	(United States) Atlanta United 2	Atlanta United FC	Free	
April 5, 2021	(United States) Kaveh Rad	(United States) Sporting Kansas City II	Sporting Kansas City	Homegrown player	
April 5, 2021	(Ecuador) Gustavo Vallecilla	(Ecuador) S.D. Aucas	FC Cincinnati	Loan	
April 6, 2021	(Canada) Sebastian Breza	(Italy) Bologna	CF Montréal	Loan	
April 6, 2021	(Canada) Sean Rea	CF Montréal	(Canada) Valour FC	Loan	
April 6, 2021	(Canada) Jonathan Sirois	CF Montréal	(Canada) Valour FC	Loan	
April 7, 2021	(Argentina) Ramón Ábila	(Argentina) Boca Juniors	Minnesota United FC	Loan	
April 7, 2021	(United States) Avionne Flanagan	(United States) South Florida Bulls	FC Cincinnati	SuperDraft	
April 7, 2021	(United States) Alfredo Morales	(Germany) Fortuna Düsseldorf	New York City FC	Transfer	
April 7, 2021	(Hungary) Szabolcs Schön	(Hungary) MTK Budapest	FC Dallas	Transfer	
April 8, 2021	(France) Kévin Cabral	(France) Valenciennes	LA Galaxy	Transfer	
April 8, 2021	(France) Mathieu Deplagne	FC Cincinnati	(United States) San Antonio FC	Free	
April 8, 2021	(Argentina) Alan Franco	(Argentina) Independiente	Atlanta United FC	Transfer	
April 8, 2021	(United States) Rio Hope-Gund	(United States) Georgetown Hoyas	Orlando City SC	SuperDraft	
April 9, 2021	(Bosnia and Herzegovina) Beni Redžić	(United States) North Texas SC	FC Dallas	Homegrown player	
April 10, 2021	(Brazil) Thiago Andrade	(Brazil) Bahia	New York City FC	Transfer	
April 10, 2021	(United States) Dylan Nealis	Inter Miami CF	Nashville SC	Trade	
April 13, 2021	(New Zealand) Noah Billingsley	Minnesota United FC	(United States) Phoenix Rising	Loan	
April 13, 2021	(United States) Edgar Castillo	Atlanta United FC	FC Cincinnati	Free	
April 15, 2021	(Argentina) Tomás Conechny	Portland Timbers	(Uruguay) Deportivo Maldonado	Free	
April 15, 2021	(United States) Shandon Hopeau	Seattle Sounders FC	(United States) San Antonio FC	Loan	
April 15, 2021	(United States) Vuk Latinovich	(United States) Milwaukee Panthers	New York City FC	SuperDraft	
April 15, 2021	(United States) Patrick Seagrist	Inter Miami CF	(United States) Indy Eleven	Loan	
April 15, 2021	(United States) Parker Siegfried	(United States) Louisville City	Sporting Kansas City	Loan	
April 16, 2021	(Mexico) Tony Alfaro	(United States) Reno 1868	D.C. United	Free	
April 16, 2021	(United States) Sami Guediri	(United States) Fort Lauderdale CF	Inter Miami CF	Free	
April 16, 2021	(Honduras) Andy Najar	Los Angeles FC	D.C. United	Free	
April 16, 2021	(United States) Will Pulisic	(United States) Duke Blue Devils	Austin FC	Free	
April 16, 2021	(Trinidad and Tobago) Luke Singh	(Canada) Toronto FC II	Toronto FC	Homegrown player	
April 16, 2021	(United States) Aedan Stanley	(United States) Duke Blue Devils	Austin FC	SuperDraft	
April 17, 2021	(United States) Saad Abdul-Salaam	FC Cincinnati	Columbus Crew	Free	
April 20, 2021	(United States) Frankie Amaya	FC Cincinnati	New York Red Bulls	Trade	
April 22, 2021	(Poland) Patryk Klimala	(Scotland) Celtic	New York Red Bulls	Transfer	
April 23, 2021	(Canada) Matteo Campagna	(Canada) Vancouver Whitecaps Academy	Vancouver Whitecaps FC	Homegrown player	
April 23, 2021	(Canada) Kamron Habibullah	(Canada) Vancouver Whitecaps Academy	Vancouver Whitecaps FC	Homegrown player	
April 23, 2021	(France) Adrien Hunou	(France) Rennes	Minnesota United FC	Transfer	
April 23, 2021	(United States) Thomas Williamson	(United States) California Golden Bears	San Jose Earthquakes	SuperDraft	
April 23, 2021	(United States) Thomas Williamson	San Jose Earthquakes	(United States) Pittsburgh Riverhounds	Loan	
April 24, 2021	(Venezuela) Yeferson Soteldo	(Brazil) Santos	Toronto FC	Transfer	
April 28, 2021	(France) Séga Coulibaly	(France) AS Nancy	LA Galaxy	Transfer	
April 28, 2021	(United States) Collin Smith	(United States) North Texas SC	FC Dallas	Homegrown Player	
May 3, 2021	(Canada) Liam Fraser	(Canada) Toronto FC	Columbus Crew	Loan	
May 3, 2021	(Sierra Leone) Augustine Williams	(United States) LA Galaxy II	LA Galaxy	Transfer	
May 7, 2021	(Jamaica) Kemar Lawrence	(Belgium) Anderlecht	Toronto FC	Transfer	
May 11, 2021	(Hungary) Dániel Gazdag	(Hungary) Honvéd	Philadelphia Union	Transfer	
May 12, 2021	(United States) Drew Skundrich	(United States) Loudoun United	D.C. United	Transfer	
May 12, 2021	(United States) Reed Baker-Whiting	(United States) Seattle Sounders Academy	Seattle Sounders FC	Homegrown	
May 12, 2021	(United States) Dom Dwyer	Orlando City SC	Toronto FC	Free	
May 13, 2021	(United States) Geoff Cameron	(England) Queens Park Rangers	FC Cincinnati	Free	
May 18, 2021	(Argentina) Lisandro López	Atlanta United FC	(Argentina) Racing Club	Free	
May 19, 2021	(Brazil) Talles Magno	(Brazil) Vasco da Gama	New York City FC	Transfer	
May 20, 2021	(Madagascar) Rayan Raveloson	(France) Troyes	LA Galaxy	Transfer	
May 20, 2021	(Norway) Jonas Fjeldberg	(United States) Dayton Flyers	FC Cincinnati	SuperDraft	
May 21, 2021	(Russia) Andrew Thomas	(United States) Stanford Cardinal	Seattle Sounders FC	Waivers	
May 22, 2021	(France) Abdoulaye Cissoko	(United States) Tacoma Defiance	Seattle Sounders FC	Transfer	
May 26, 2021	(England) Jack Gurr	Atlanta United FC	(Scotland) Aberdeen	Free	
May 29, 2021	(Argentina) Jonathan Menéndez	(Argentina) Independiente	Real Salt Lake	Transfer	
June 2, 2021	(United States) Brian White	New York Red Bulls	Vancouver Whitecaps FC	Trade	
June 2, 2021	(Croatia) Toni Datković	(Greece) Aris	Real Salt Lake	Transfer	
June 4, 2021	(United States) Bryce Washington	(United States) Pittsburgh Panthers	Atlanta United FC	Homegrown Player	
June 4, 2021	(Ghana) George Asomani	(United States) NC State Wolfpack	San Jose Earthquakes	SuperDraft	
June 5, 2021	(Senegal) Mamadou Fall	(United States) Montverde Academy	Los Angeles FC	MLS Waivers	
June 8, 2021	(United States) George Fochive	(Israel) Bnei Yehuda Tel Aviv	Portland Timbers	Transfer	
June 9, 2021	(Uruguay) Santiago Rodríguez	(Uruguay) Montevideo City	New York City FC	Loan	
June 10, 2021	(Jamaica) Alvas Powell	(Sudan) Al-Hilal Club	Philadelphia Union	Free	
June 11, 2021	(Senegal) Mamadou Fall	Los Angeles FC	(United States) Las Vegas Lights FC	Loan	
June 14, 2021	(Argentina) Facundo Quignon	(Argentina) Lanús	FC Dallas	Transfer	
June 15, 2021	(United States) Thomas Williams	(United States) Orlando City SC	Orlando City Academy	Homegrown	
June 19, 2021	(United States) Zackery Farnsworth	(United States) Real Salt Lake Academy	Real Salt Lake	Homegrown	
June 25, 2021	(Brazil) Nathan	(Switzerland) FC Zürich	San Jose Earthquakes	Transfer	
June 27, 2021	(Iceland) Róbert Thorkelsson	(Iceland) Breiðablik	CF Montréal	Transfer	
June 28, 2021	(Zimbabwe) Teenage Hadebe	(Turkey) Yeni Malatyaspor	Houston Dynamo	Transfer	
June 28, 2021	(United States) Christian Ramirez	Houston Dynamo	(Scotland) Aberdeen	Transfer	
June 30, 2021	(Senegal) Moussa Djitté	(France) Grenoble	Austin FC	Transfer	
July 1, 2021	(England) Kieran Gibbs	(England) West Bromwich Albion	Inter Miami CF	Free	
July 1, 2021	(Netherlands) Nick Marsman	(Netherlands) Feyenoord	Inter Miami CF	Transfer	
July 1, 2021	(United States) Bobby Wood	(Germany) Hamburger SV	Real Salt Lake	Free	
July 2, 2021	(United States) Jeremy Garay	(United States) D.C. United Academy	D.C. United	Homegrown Player	
July 3, 2021	(United States) Arquimides Ordonez	(United States) FC Cincinnati Academy	FC Cincinnati	Homegrown Player	
July 5, 2021	(United States) Griffin Dorsey	(Canada) Toronto FC	Houston Dynamo	Free	
July 6, 2021	(Germany) Amar Sejdic	(Canada) CF Montreal	Atlanta United FC	Trade	
July 7, 2021	(United States) Daniel Aguirre	(United States) LA Galaxy II	LA Galaxy	Transfer	
July 7, 2021	(United States) Indiana Vassilev	(England) Aston Villa	Inter Miami CF	Loan	
July 7, 2021	(Ivory Coast) Aké Loba	(Mexico) Monterrey	Nashville SC	Transfer	
July 8, 2021	(United States) Erik Hurtado	(Canada) CF Montréal	Columbus Crew	Trade	
July 12, 2021	(Canada) Derek Cornelius	Vancouver Whitecaps FC	(Greece) Panetolikos	Loan	
July 13, 2021	(Slovenia) Matej Oravec	Philadelphia Union	(Slovenia) Železiarne Podbrezová	Loan	
July 14, 2021	(United States) Adam Grinwis	(United States) Sacramento Republic	Orlando City SC	Free	
July 15, 2021	(United States) Tanner Tessmann	FC Dallas	(Italy) Venezia	Transfer	
July 17, 2021	(Argentina) Emmanuel Mas	(Argentina) Boca Juniors	Orlando City SC	Free	
July 17, 2021	(United States) Tom Judge	(United States) James Madison Dukes	Nashville SC	SuperDraft	
July 17, 2021	(United States) Tor Saunders	(United States) Coastal Carolina Chanticleers	Nashville SC	SuperDraft	
July 23, 2021	(Argentina) Fernando Meza	Atlanta United FC	(Mexico) Necaxa	Free	
July 27, 2021	(Canada) Mark-Anthony Kaye	Los Angeles FC	Colorado Rapids	Trade	
July 29, 2021	(Argentina) Sebastián Driussi	(Russia) Zenit St. Petersburg	Austin FC	Free	
July 29, 2021	(Sweden) Tom Pettersson	FC Cincinnati	(Norway) Lillestrøm SK	Free	
July 29, 2021	(Senegal) Dominique Badji	Nashville SC	Colorado Rapids	Trade	
July 29, 2021	(United States) Ventura Alvarado	(Mexico) San Luis	Inter Miami CF	Free	
July 29, 2021	(Venezuela) Jesús Bueno	(Venezuela) Deportivo Lara	Philadelphia Union	Transfer	
July 29, 2021	(Colombia) Santiago Moreno	(Colombia) América de Cali	Portland Timbers	Transfer	
July 30, 2021	(United States) McKinze Gaines	(Germany) Hannover 96	Austin FC	Free	
July 30, 2021	(United States) Corey Baird	Los Angeles FC	Houston Dynamo	Trade	
July 30, 2021	(Costa Rica) Giancarlo González	LA Galaxy	(Costa Rica) Alajuelense	Loan	
July 31, 2021	(United States) Adam Grinwis	(United States) Sacramento Republic	Orlando City Academy	Free	
July 31, 2021	(Scotland) Ryan Gauld	(Portugal) Farense	Vancouver Whitecaps FC	Transfer	
August 2, 2021	(Colombia) Cristian Arango	(Colombia) Millonarios	Los Angeles FC	Transfer	
August 2, 2021	(Argentina) Matías Pellegrini	Inter Miami CF	(Argentina) Estudiantes	Loan	
August 3, 2021	(United States) Tyler Freeman	Sporting Kansas City	(Germany) Karlsruher SC	Loan	
August 4, 2021	(Poland) Przemysław Frankowski	Chicago Fire	(France) Lens	Transfer	
August 5, 2021	(Panama) Adalberto Carrasquilla	(Spain) Cartagena	Houston Dynamo	Loan	
August 5, 2021	(Serbia) Dejan Joveljić	(Germany) Eintracht Frankfurt	LA Galaxy	Transfer	
August 5, 2021	(Uruguay) Lucas Monzón	(Uruguay) Danubio	New York Red Bulls	Loan	
August 5, 2021	(France) Florian Valot	New York Red Bulls	FC Cincinnati	Trade	
August 5, 2021	(United States) Sam Vines	Colorado Rapids	(Belgium) Royal Antwerp	Transfer	
August 5, 2021	(United States) Jeremy Ebobisse	Portland Timbers	San Jose Earthquakes	Trade	
August 5, 2021	(France) Nicolas Benezet	Colorado Rapids	Seattle Sounders FC	Trade	
August 5, 2021	(Brazil) Léo Chú	(Brazil) Grêmio	Seattle Sounders FC	Transfer	
August 5, 2021	(Italy) José Mauri	(Argentina) Talleres	Sporting Kansas City	Free	
August 5, 2021	(United States) Gianluca Busio	Sporting Kansas City	(Italy) Venezia	Transfer	
August 5, 2021	(Ecuador) Pedro Vite	(Ecuador) Independiente del Valle	Vancouver Whitecaps FC	Transfer	
August 6, 2021	(Brazil) Luiz Araújo	(France) Lille	Atlanta United FC	Transfer	
August 6, 2021	(England) Tyler Blackett	(England) Nottingham Forest	FC Cincinnati	Free	
August 6, 2021	(Finland) Niko Hämäläinen	(England) Queens Park Rangers	LA Galaxy	Transfer	
August 6, 2021	(United States) Sebastien Ibeagha	New York City FC	Los Angeles FC	Trade	
August 6, 2021	(Argentina) Federico Navarro	(Argentina) Talleres	Chicago Fire	Transfer	
August 6, 2021	(Honduras) Joseph Rosales	(Panama) Independiente Chorrera	Minnesota United FC	Loan	
August 6, 2021	(Germany) Florian Jungwirth	San Jose Earthquakes	Vancouver Whitecaps FC	Trade	
August 6, 2021	(Canada) Theo Bair	Vancouver Whitecaps FC	(Norway) HamKam	Loan	
August 20, 2021	(United States) Matko Miljevic	(Argentina) Argentinos Juniors	CF Montréal	Transfer	
August 20, 2021	(Canada) Marcus Godinho	(Germany) FSV Zwickau	Vancouver Whitecaps FC	Free	
August 23, 2021	(France) Steven Moreira	(France) Toulouse	Columbus Crew	Free	
August 24, 2021	(Honduras) Douglas Martínez	Real Salt Lake	(United States) San Diego Loyal	Loan	
August 27, 2021	(Canada) Simon Colyn	Vancouver Whitecaps FC	(Netherlands) Jong PSV	Loan	
August 31, 2021	(United States) Jack de Vries	Philadelphia Union	(Italy) Venezia	Loan	
