= Lucas Monzón =

Lucas Monzón may refer to:

- Lucas Monzón (Argentine footballer) (born 1996), Argentine football defender
- Lucas Monzón (Uruguayan footballer) (born 2001), Uruguayan football defender
