= Dru Yearwood =

English footballer (born 2000)

Personal information
- Full name: Dru Anthony Yearwood
- Date of birth: 17 February 2000 (age 26)
- Place of birth: Harlow, England
- Height: 5 ft 8 in (1.73 m)
- Position: Defensive midfielder

Team information
- Current team: Chaves
- Number: 16

Youth career
- 2007–2011: Arsenal
- 2011–2017: Southend United

Senior career*
Years	Team	Apps	(Gls)
2017–2019	Southend United	53	(0)
2019–2020	Brentford	2	(0)
2020–2023	New York Red Bulls	86	(3)
2021–2023	New York Red Bulls II	7	(0)
2024	Nashville SC	25	(1)
2024	→ Huntsville City	1	(0)
2025–2026	Rotherham United	29	(0)
2026–	Chaves	0	(0)
- * Club domestic league appearances and goals as of 11:13, 24 July 2026 (UTC)

Dru Anthony Yearwood (born 17 February 2000) is an English professional footballer who plays as a defensive midfielder for Chaves. He is a product of the Arsenal and Southend United youth systems and began his senior career with Southend. He further played one season for Brentford.

== Early life ==
Yearwood was born in Harlow, Essex. He is of Barbadian descent, through his father.

== Club career ==
=== Southend United ===
After spending four years with the Arsenal academy, Yearwood moved to the Southend United youth system at the age of 11 and graduated to the first team squad in July 2017, when he signed a four-year professional contract. He was a regular member of the team during the 2017–18 and 2018–19 League One seasons and he was nominated for the LFE Apprentice of the Year award at the 2018 EFL Awards.

=== Brentford ===
Yearwood signed for Championship club Brentford on 5 August 2019, on a four-year contract, with the option of a further year, for an undisclosed fee. Throughout the 2019–2020 season and Brentford's promotion push, Yearwood only made two appearances in the league and three other appearances in the Cups. He left the club after one season in a bid to further his career and play more games.

=== New York Red Bulls ===
On 5 August 2020 it was announced that Yearwood joined Major League Soccer club New York Red Bulls. Yearwood was signed on a Young Designated Player deal. Yearwood made his debut for the Red Bulls coming on as a substitute in a 3–0 loss against the Philadelphia Union. On 11 September 2021, Yearwood scored his first senior goal in a 1–1 draw against DC United. On 24 July 2022, Yearwood scored his first of the season and assisted on another goal for New York in a 4–3 victory over Austin FC. For his efforts during the match, Yearwood was named to the MLS Team of the Week. On 2 August 2022, Yearwood opened the scoring for New York in a 5–4 loss to Colorado Rapids. On 9 September 2022, Yearwood was fined and suspended for four games following an incident at the end of a match against the Philadelphia Union on 3 September where, in a moment of frustration, he kicked the ball into the stands which subsequently struck a fan in the face. Yearwood apologized for his actions via the team's Twitter account.

=== Nashville SC ===
Yearwood was acquired by Nashville SC on 11 December 2023. He was released by Nashville following their 2024 season.

=== Rotherham United ===
On 19 July 2025, Yearwood returned to England, joining League One side Rotherham United on a one-year deal with the option to extend.

On 13 July 2026, Yearwood joined Liga Portugal 2 side Chaves.

== International career ==
Yearwood was born in England and is of Barbadian descent. He was called up to represent the Barbados national team for a friendly against Saint Lucia in 2016, but did not make an appearance. Yearwood was called into the England U18 squad for the 2018 Panda Cup, but a hamstring injury prevented his participation.

== Career statistics ==
As of match played 14 August 2023

Appearances and goals by club, season and competition
Club	Season	League			National cup		League cup		Other		Total	
Club	Season	Division	Apps	Goals	Apps	Goals	Apps	Goals	Apps	Goals	Apps	Goals
Southend United	2017–18	League One	26	0	0	0	1	0	2 (Note: Appearances in EFL Trophy)	0	29	0
Southend United	2018–19	League One	27	0	2	0	0	0	4	0	33	0
Southend United	Total		53	0	2	0	1	0	6	0	62	0
Brentford	2019–20	Championship	2	0	2	0	1	0	―		5	0
New York Red Bulls	2020	Major League Soccer	12	0	―		―		1 (Note: Appearance(s) in MLS Cup Playoffs)	0	13	0
New York Red Bulls	2021	Major League Soccer	29	1	0	0	―		1	0	30	1
New York Red Bulls	2022	Major League Soccer	25	2	3	0	―		0	0	28	2
New York Red Bulls	2023	Major League Soccer	20	0	2	0	4 (Note: Appearance(s) in Leagues Cup)	0	2 (Note: Appearance(s) in MLS Cup Playoffs)	0	28	0
New York Red Bulls	Total		86	3	5	0	4	0	4	0	99	3
Career total			141	3	9	0	6	0	10	0	166	3

== Honours ==
Individual

- Southend United Player of the Month: February 2018, March 2018
