= Tom Edwards (footballer, born 1999) =

English footballer

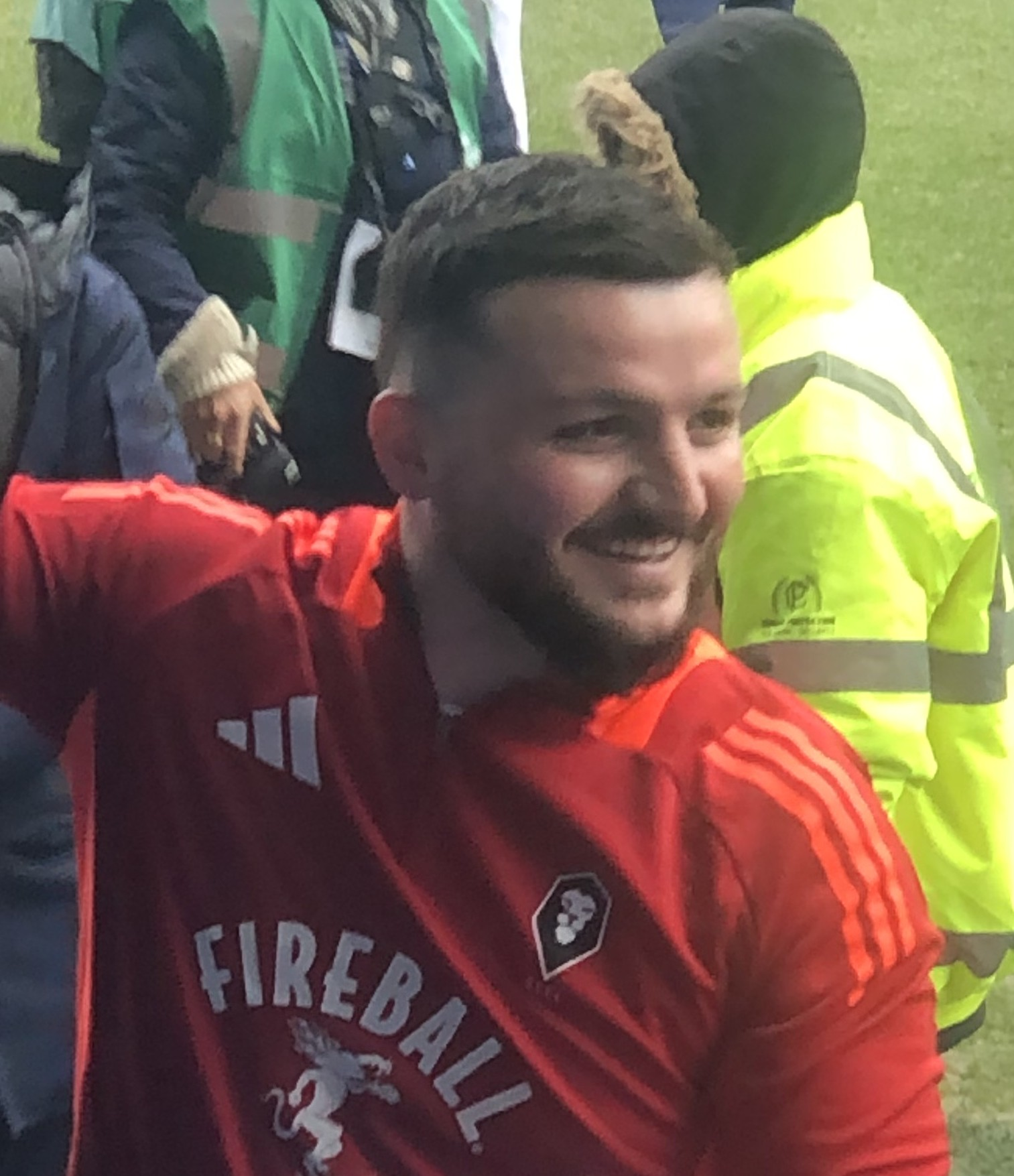
- Tom Edwards in 2025.

Personal information
- Full name: Thomas Adam Edwards
- Date of birth: 22 January 1999 (age 27)
- Place of birth: Stafford, England
- Height: 1.75 m (5 ft 9 in)
- Position: Right-back

Youth career
- 2007–2010: Stafford Town
- 2010–2017: Stoke City

Senior career*
Years	Team	Apps	(Gls)
2017–2024	Stoke City	46	(1)
2020–2021	→ Fleetwood Town (loan)	11	(0)
2021	→ New York Red Bulls (loan)	27	(0)
2022	→ New York Red Bulls (loan)	20	(0)
2022–2023	→ Barnsley (loan)	10	(0)
2023–2024	→ Huddersfield Town (loan)	13	(0)
2024–2026	Salford City	24	(0)
Total		151	(1)

International career
2018–2019	England U20	3	(0)
- * Club domestic league appearances and goals

Thomas Adam Edwards (born 22 January 1999) is an English former professional footballer who played as a right-back.

== Early life ==
Edwards was born in Stafford and attended Blessed William Howard Catholic School. Edwards completed his final GCSE year at Ormiston Sir Stanley Matthews Academy in Blurton due to its links with the Stoke City Academy.

== Career ==
=== Stoke City ===
Edwards joined Stoke City's academy at the age of 11 from Stafford Town and progressed through the ranks to win the under-18 player of the year twice. He became involved in first team duties in 2017–18 and signed a four-year contract with the club in September 2017. Edwards made his Premier League debut on 14 October 2017 against Manchester City and he provided the cross for Stoke's second goal but was stretchered off after picking up an ankle injury. Edwards made his home debut on 23 December 2017 against West Bromwich Albion where he was named as man of the match in a 3–1 victory. He signed another improved four-year contract with Stoke in February 2018. Edwards featured seven times for Stoke under Mark Hughes but didn't feature in the second half of the campaign under Paul Lambert as Stoke suffered relegation to the EFL Championship.

Edwards became a regular member of the team in 2018–19 playing 29 times as Stoke ultimately had a forgettable campaign, finishing in 16th place. Edwards was one of Stoke's better performers during the season and earned the praise of manager Nathan Jones. Edwards scored his first goal for Stoke on 22 April 2019 in a 2–2 draw against Norwich City.

Edwards signed a new four-and-a-half-year contract with Stoke in October 2019. Edwards competed with Tommy Smith for the right-back position at Stoke in 2019–20 and whilst he featured 15 times in the first half of the campaign, manager Michael O'Neill went with Smith until the end of the season.

==== Fleetwood Town (loan) ====
In October 2020 Edwards joined EFL League One side Fleetwood Town on loan for the 2020–21 season. Edwards played 12 times for Fleetwood before he was recalled by Stoke in January 2021.

==== New York Red Bulls (loan) ====
On 27 January 2021, it was announced that Edwards had joined Major League Soccer side New York Red Bulls on loan for the 2021 season. Edwards made 28 appearances for the team as they finished in 7th position in the Eastern Conference, qualifying for the 2021 MLS Cup Playoffs where they were defeated 1–0 by Philadelphia Union in the First round. He returned to Stoke in January 2022 but did not get back into the squad after picking up an injury. On 17 February 2022, Edwards returned to New York Red Bulls for the 2022 season.

==== Barnsley (loan) ====
On 1 September 2022, Edwards returned to England and signed for League One side Barnsley for the 2022–23 season. He scored his first goal for the club in a 2–1 defeat to Port Vale in the Round of 32 of the EFL Trophy. Edwards suffered a serious knee injury in January 2023 and his loan spell was cut short.

==== Huddersfield Town (loan) ====
In July 2023, Edwards joined Huddersfield Town on loan for the 2023–24 season. Edwards made 13 appearances for the Terriers as they suffered relegation to League One.

In May 2024, Stoke City confirmed that Edwards would depart the club upon the expiration of his contract having not been offered new terms.

=== Salford City ===
On 13 July 2024, Edwards joined League Two side Salford City on a two-year deal. He spent two seasons with Salford before deciding to retire from professional football due to persistent injuries.

== International career ==
Edwards was called up to the England U20 side by Paul Simpson in September 2018 and went on to play in three Under 20 Elite League matches.

== Career statistics ==
Appearances and goals by club, season and competition
Club	Season	League			National Cup		League Cup		Other		Total	
Club	Season	Division	Apps	Goals	Apps	Goals	Apps	Goals	Apps	Goals	Apps	Goals
Stoke City U21	2016–17	—	—		—		—		2 (Note: Appearances in EFL Trophy)	0	2	0
Stoke City U21	2017–18	—	—		—		—		1	0	1	0
Stoke City U21	Total		—		—		—		3	0	3	0
Stoke City	2017–18	Premier League	6	0	1	0	0	0	—		7	0
Stoke City	2018–19	Championship	27	1	1	0	1	0	—		29	1
Stoke City	2019–20	Championship	13	0	1	0	1	0	—		15	0
Stoke City	2020–21	Championship	0	0	0	0	0	0	—		0	0
Stoke City	2021–22	Championship	0	0	0	0	0	0	—		0	0
Stoke City	2022–23	Championship	0	0	0	0	0	0	—		0	0
Stoke City	2023–24	Championship	0	0	0	0	0	0	—		0	0
Stoke City	Total		46	1	3	0	2	0	—		51	1
Fleetwood Town (loan)	2020–21	League One	11	0	1	0	0	0	—		12	0
New York Red Bulls (loan)	2021	Major League Soccer	27	0	0	0	—		1 (Note: Appearances in 2021 MLS Cup Playoffs)	0	28	0
New York Red Bulls (loan)	2022	Major League Soccer	20	0	3	0	—		0	0	23	0
New York Red Bulls (loan)	Total		47	0	3	0	—		1	0	51	0
Barnsley (loan)	2022–23	League One	10	0	3	0	0	0	2	1	15	1
Huddersfield Town (loan)	2023–24	Championship	13	0	0	0	0	0	—		13	0
Salford City	2024–25	League Two	19	0	1	0	1	0	3	0	24	0
Salford City	2025–26	League Two	5	0	0	0	1	0	2	0	8	0
Salford City	Total		24	0	1	0	2	0	5	0	32	0
Career total			151	1	11	0	4	0	11	1	177	2
