= Lucas Monzón (Argentine footballer) =

Argentine footballer

Personal information
- Full name: Lucas Ramiro Monzón
- Date of birth: 27 February 1996 (age 30)
- Place of birth: Argentina
- Position: Defender

Senior career*
Years	Team	Apps	(Gls)
2018–2020	Defensores Unidos	18	(0)
- * Club domestic league appearances and goals as of 17:47, 15 May 2019 (UTC)

Lucas Ramiro Monzón (born 27 February 1996) is an Argentine professional footballer who plays as a defender.

== Career ==
Monzón's career started with Defensores Unidos. He made his senior debut during 2018–19 against Flandria in Primera B Metropolitana, appearing for the full duration of a 2–1 victory on 7 December 2018.

== Career statistics ==
As of 15 May 2019.

Appearances and goals by club, season and competition
Club	Season	League			Cup		League Cup		Continental		Other		Total	
Club	Season	Division	Apps	Goals	Apps	Goals	Apps	Goals	Apps	Goals	Apps	Goals	Apps	Goals
Defensores Unidos	2018–19	Primera B Metropolitana	3	0	0	0	—		—		0	0	3	0
Career total			3	0	0	0	—		—		0	0	3	0
