= AJ Marcucci =

American soccer player (born 1999)

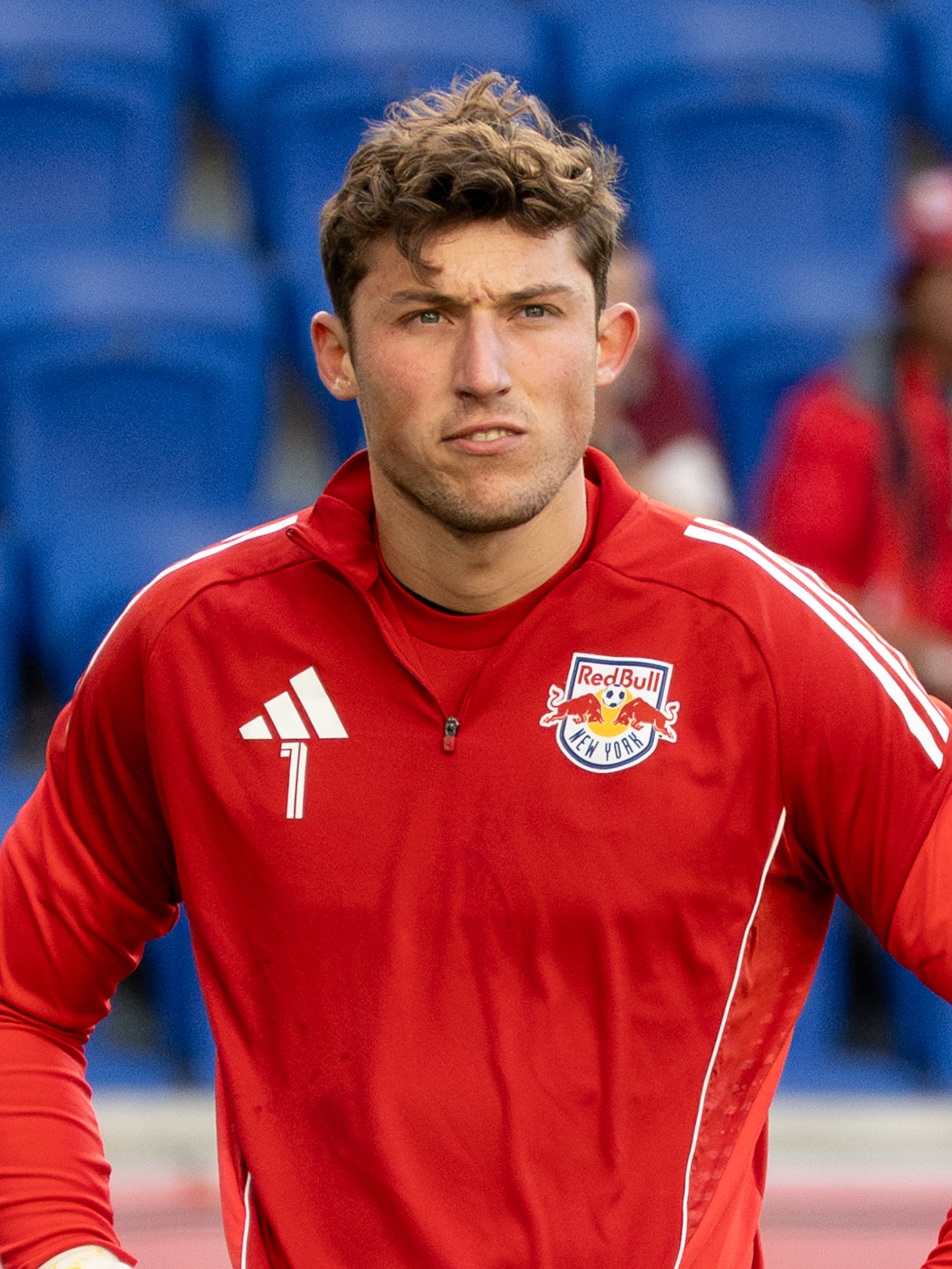
- Marcucci in 2025

Personal information
- Full name: Anthony Marcucci Jr.
- Date of birth: August 31, 1999 (age 27)
- Place of birth: West Chester, Pennsylvania, United States
- Height: 6 ft 3 in (1.91 m)
- Position: Goalkeeper

Team information
- Current team: New York Red Bulls
- Number: 1

Youth career
- 2014–2017: Penn Fusion

College career
Years	Team	Apps	(Gls)
2017–2020	Connecticut College Camels	54	(0)

Senior career*
Years	Team	Apps	(Gls)
2019–2020	West Chester United	4	(0)
2021–2024	New York Red Bulls II	54	(0)
2021–	New York Red Bulls	2	(0)
2024	→ Gnistan (loan)	14	(0)
- * Club domestic league appearances and goals as of August 18, 2025

Anthony "AJ" Marcucci Jr. (born August 31, 1999) is an American soccer player who plays as a goalkeeper for Major League Soccer club New York Red Bulls.

== Career ==
=== Youth career ===
Marcucci played at the Episcopal Academy through high school. He also played as part of the Penn Fusion academy until 2017.

=== College career ===
In 2017, Marcucci attended Connecticut College to play college soccer. With the Camels, Marcucci appeared in 54 of the team's 55 matches between 2017 and 2019; the 2020 season was canceled due to the COVID-19 pandemic. Marcucci finished his career with a school-record 25 career shutouts to go along with an .887 save percentage, and an 0.50 goals against average.

Marcucci earned a place on the NCAA All-America First Team as the nation's top Division III goalkeeper twice by both the United Soccer Coaches and D3soccer.com in 2018 and 2019. He was also named the NESCAC Rookie of the Year in 2017 and the NESCAC Player of the Year in 2018.

While at college, Marcucci also appeared for NPSL side West Chester United during their 2019 season. He was set to play with the team during their 2020 season in the USL League Two, but the season was eventually canceled.

=== New York Red Bulls ===
On January 21, 2021, Marcucci was selected 67th overall in the 2021 MLS SuperDraft by New York Red Bulls. He became the first ever draft pick from Connecticut College and was the first Division III pick since 2016.

On April 15, 2021, Marcucci signed with New York's USL Championship side New York Red Bulls II. He made his debut on May 14, 2021, starting in a 1–0 loss to the Miami FC. On May 18, 2021, Marcucci recorded his first win with New York in a 2–1 victory over Loudoun United.

On September 11, 2021, Marcucci moved to the New York Red Bulls first team roster in MLS.

==== Loan to Gnistan ====
On July 21, 2024, Marcucci was loaned out to Finnish Veikkausliiga club IF Gnistan until the end of the 2024 season. He debuted with his new team in Veikkausliiga in the next day on July 22, saving a penalty in stoppage-time and securing his side a point in a 2–2 away draw against Inter Turku. During his loan stint, Marcucci made 14 appearances for Gnistan, keeping five clean sheets. During this period he helped guide the club through the relegation round and into the Conference League play-offs, where they reached the semifinals.

==== Return to New York Red Bulls ====
At the conclusion of his loan period in Finland, Marcucci returned to New York for the 2025 season. On March 22, 2025, he made his first team debut for New York, starting in a 2–1 victory over Toronto FC.

== Career statistics ==
As of match played August 14, 2025

Appearances and goals by club, season and competition
Club	Season	League			National cup (Note: Includes U.S. Open Cup)		Continental		Other		Total	
Club	Season	Division	Apps	Goals	Apps	Goals	Apps	Goals	Apps	Goals	Apps	Goals
New York Red Bulls II	2021	USL Championship	19	0	—		—		—		19	0
New York Red Bulls II	2022	USL Championship	14	0	—		—		—		14	0
New York Red Bulls II	2023	MLS Next Pro	20	0	—		—		—		20	0
New York Red Bulls II	2024	MLS Next Pro	1	0	—		—		—		1	0
New York Red Bulls II	Total		54	0	0	0	0	0	0	0	54	0
Gnistan (loan)	2024	Veikkausliiga	14	0	0	0	—		0	0	14	0
New York Red Bulls	2025	Major League Soccer	2	0	3	0	0	0	2 (Note: Appearances in Leagues Cup)	0	7	0
New York Red Bulls	2026	Major League Soccer	0	0	0	0	—		—		0	0
New York Red Bulls	Total		2	0	3	0	0	0	2	0	7	0
Career total			70	0	3	0	0	0	2	0	75	0
