= Luca Lewis =

American football player

Personal information
- Full name: Luca Robert Lewis
- Date of birth: February 22, 2001 (age 25)
- Place of birth: New York, New York, U.S.
- Height: 1.92 m (6 ft 4 in)
- Position: Goalkeeper

Youth career
- 2015–2017: IMG Academy
- 2017–2020: Torino

Senior career*
Years	Team	Apps	(Gls)
2020	New York Red Bulls II	14	(0)
2021	New York Red Bulls	0	(0)
2022–2024	Cesena	10	(0)
2023–2024	→ Pontedera (loan)	9	(0)
- * Club domestic league appearances and goals as of March 25, 2024

Luca Robert Lewis (born February 22, 2001) is an American professional soccer player who plays as a goalkeeper.

== Career ==
=== Youth ===
Lewis began playing with the IMG Academy in Florida in 2015, before moving to Italy to play with Serie A side Torino's academy.

=== New York Red Bulls II ===
Lewis returned to the United States on September 22, 2020, joining USL Championship side New York Red Bulls II. He made his debut on September 26, 2020, starting in a 5–4 win over Philadelphia Union II.

=== New York Red Bulls ===
On December 11, 2020, Lewis made the move to New York's MLS roster ahead of their 2021 season. Following the 2021 season, New York declined their contract option on Lewis.

=== Cesena and loan to Pontedera ===
On July 28, 2023, Lewis signed a contract with Italian Serie C club Cesena until June 30, 2024.

On July 29, 2023, he was loaned to Pontedera.

On 11 July 2024 he left Cesena by mutual consent.
