= Bento Estrela =

Portuguese footballer

Personal information
- Full name: Bento Luís Estrela
- Date of birth: February 10, 2006 (age 20)
- Place of birth: Newark, New Jersey, U.S.
- Height: 6 ft 1 in (1.85 m)
- Position: Midfielder

Team information
- Current team: Sporting CP B

Youth career
- 2019–2022: New York Red Bulls

Senior career*
Years	Team	Apps	(Gls)
2021–2024	New York Red Bulls	0	(0)
2021–2024	New York Red Bulls II	40	(0)
2024–	Sporting CP B	0	(0)

International career
2021–2022	Portugal U16	3	(0)
- * Club domestic league appearances and goals as of March 25, 2024

Bento Luís Estrela (born February 10, 2006) is a professional footballer who plays as a midfielder for Sporting CP B. Born in the United States, he is a youth international for Portugal.

== Club career ==
Born in Newark, New Jersey, Estrela joined the New York Red Bulls youth academy in July 2019, at the age of 13. He immediately began playing with the club's under-19 squad.

=== New York Red Bulls ===
On February 9, 2021, one day before his 15th birthday, Estrela signed a professional homegrown player deal with the New York Red Bulls. At 14 years and 364 days old, Estrela was the youngest signing in New York Red Bulls history, and the 4th youngest signing in Major League Soccer history. Estrela made his professional debut for New York Red Bulls II, the club's reserve side, on August 28, 2022, in their USL Championship match against Birmingham Legion.

On 20 March 2024, Estrela made his U.S. Open Cup debut, appearing as a starter for New York Red Bulls II in a 5–1 victory over Hudson Valley Hammers in the first round of the U.S. Open Cup.

=== Sporting CP ===
On 28 August 2024, Estrela moved to Sporting CP for an undisclosed transfer fee.

== International career ==
Estrela was born in the United States, to a Portuguese mother of Cape Verdean descent. He holds American and Portuguese citizenship. In August 2021, Estrela was called into camp with the Portugal U16 side. On May 5, 2022, Estrela made his first appearance for the Portugal under-16's in a 4–1 victory against Belgium. In an interview with the Portuguese Football Federation, Estrela stated that "I feel Portuguese and I represent our colors. I have to do my best for the shield that I carry on my chest."

On August 16, 2022, Estrela was called into camp for the United States under-17 squad.

== Career statistics ==
As of match played July 28, 2024

Appearances and goals by club, season and competition
Club	Season	League			Playoffs		National cup (Note: Includes U.S. Open Cup)		Continental		Total	
Club	Season	Division	Apps	Goals	Apps	Goals	Apps	Goals	Apps	Goals	Apps	Goals
New York Red Bulls II	2022	USL Championship	6	0	—		—		—		6	0
New York Red Bulls II	2023	MLS Next Pro	20	0	1	0	—		—		21	0
New York Red Bulls II	2024	MLS Next Pro	14	0	0	0	1	0	—		15	0
Career total			40	0	1	0	1	0	0	0	42	0
