= Lucas Monzón (Uruguayan footballer) =

Uruguayan footballer (born 2001)

Personal information
- Full name: Lucas Gabriel Monzón Lemos
- Date of birth: 29 September 2001 (age 25)
- Place of birth: Jaguarão, Brazil
- Height: 1.84 m (6 ft 0 in)
- Position: Centre-back

Team information
- Current team: Botafogo
- Number: 33

Youth career
- Juventud
- Danubio

Senior career*
| Years | Team | Apps | (Gls) |
| 2020–2023 | Danubio | 38 | (0) |
| 2021 | → Montevideo Wanderers (loan) | 5 | (0) |
| 2021–2022 | → New York Red Bulls (loan) | 1 | (0) |
| 2021–2022 | → New York Red Bulls II (loan) | 2 | (0) |
| 2024–2026 | Racing Montevideo | 34 | (1) |
| 2025–2026 | → Atlético Junior (loan) | 20 | (1) |
| 2026– | Botafogo | 0 | (0) |

International career^{‡}
| 2024– | Uruguay local | 2 | (0) |
- * Club domestic league appearances and goals as of 13:03, 21 July 2026 (UTC) ‡ National team caps and goals as of 5 December 2024

Lucas Gabriel Monzón Lemos (born 29 September 2001) is a Uruguayan professional footballer who plays as a defender for Campeonato Brasileiro Série A club Botafogo.

== Club career ==
Born in Jaguarão, Brazil, Monzón began his career in the youth ranks of Juventud prior to joining Danubio. A youth academy graduate of Danubio, Monzón made his professional debut on 14 August 2020 in Danubio's 2–1 win against Montevideo City Torque.

In April 2021, Monzón joined Montevideo Wanderers on a season long loan deal. On 29 June 2021, Monzón made his debut for Wanderers, appearing as a starter in a 1-0 victory over Cerrito.

On 5 August 2021, Monzón joined Major League Soccer club New York Red Bulls on a loan deal until the end of 2022 season. On 18 July 2022, New York and Monzón mutually agreed to terminate his loan at the club early.

== International career ==
Monzón is a former Uruguay youth international. On 1 September 2024, he made his debut for the Uruguay local national team in a 1–1 draw against Guatemala.

== Career statistics ==
=== Club ===
As of 18 March 2021

Appearances and goals by club, season and competition
| Club | Season | League | | | Cup | | Continental | | Total | |
| Club | Season | Division | Apps | Goals | Apps | Goals | Apps | Goals | Apps | Goals |
|---|---|---|---|---|---|---|---|---|---|---|
| Danubio | 2020 | Uruguayan Primera División | 19 | 0 | — | | — | | 19 | 0 |
| Montevideo Wanderers | 2021 | Uruguayan Primera División | 5 | 0 | — | | — | | 5 | 0 |
| Career total | | | 24 | 0 | 0 | 0 | 0 | 0 | 24 | 0 |
