= Adri Mehmeti =

American soccer player (born 2009)

- Mehmeti with the New York Red Bulls in 2026

Personal information
- Date of birth: April 6, 2009 (age 17)
- Place of birth: New York City, New York, U.S.
- Height: 1.83 m (6 ft 0 in)
- Position: Midfielder

Team information
- Current team: New York Red Bulls
- Number: 15

Youth career
- New York Red Bulls

Senior career*
| Years | Team | Apps | (Gls) |
| 2024–2025 | New York Red Bulls II | 40 | (1) |
| 2025– | New York Red Bulls | 32 | (2) |

International career^{‡}
| 2023 | Albania U15 | 3 | (1) |
| 2023–2024 | United States U15 | 7 | (1) |
| 2026– | United States | 4 | (0) |
- * Club domestic league appearances and goals as of October 16, 2026 ‡ National team caps and goals as of November 14, 2026

Adri Mehmeti (born April 6, 2009) is an American professional soccer player who plays as a central midfielder for Major League Soccer club New York Red Bulls and the United States national team.

== Club career ==
=== Early career ===
Born in New York City to Albanian parents, Mehmeti joined the New York Red Bulls Academy in 2019 and featured within Red Bulls Academy up to the U-15 level. He trained with FC Red Bull Salzburg in winter of 2024. During the 2024 season Mehmeti featured for New York Red Bulls II in MLS Next Pro. On March 20, 2024, Mehmeti made his professional debut, coming on as a second-half substitute for New York Red Bulls II in a 5–1 victory over Hudson Valley Hammers in the first round of the U.S. Open Cup. On May 8, 2024, Mehmeti made his MLS Next Pro debut for Red Bulls II against Orlando City B.

=== New York Red Bulls ===
On December 10, 2024, Mehmeti signed a four-year contract with the first team.

== International career ==
Mehmeti was eligible to represent the United States and Albania. He represented Albania at the U-15 level but is now cap-tied to the United States.

He was one of the 28 players were called up with the United States national team by head coach Mauricio Pochettino for friendly matches against Peru, Chile, Mexico, and Canada on September 26 and 29 and October 3 and 6, 2026 respectively.

== Career statistics ==
=== Club ===
As of match played November 6, 2026

Appearances and goals by club, season and competition
| Club | Season | League | | | U.S. Open Cup | | Continental | | Other | | Total | |
| Club | Season | Division | Apps | Goals | Apps | Goals | Apps | Goals | Apps | Goals | Apps | Goals |
|---|---|---|---|---|---|---|---|---|---|---|---|---|
| New York Red Bulls II | 2024 | MLS Next Pro | 15 | 0 | 1 | 0 | — | | — | | 16 | 0 |
| New York Red Bulls II | 2025 | MLS Next Pro | 25 | 1 | — | | — | | 4 (Note: Appearances in MLS Next Pro playoffs) | 0 | 29 | 1 |
| New York Red Bulls II | Total | | 40 | 1 | 1 | 0 | — | | 4 | 0 | 45 | 1 |
| New York Red Bulls | 2025 | Major League Soccer | 0 | 0 | 0 | 0 | — | | 1 (Note: Appearance in Leagues Cup) | 0 | 1 | 0 |
| New York Red Bulls | 2026 | Major League Soccer | 32 | 2 | 2 | 0 | — | | 0 | 0 | 34 | 2 |
| New York Red Bulls | Total | | 32 | 2 | 2 | 0 | — | | 1 | 0 | 35 | 2 |
| Career total | | | 72 | 3 | 3 | 0 | 0 | 0 | 5 | 0 | 80 | 3 |

=== International ===
As of match played November 14, 2026

Appearances and goals by national team and year
| National team | Year | Apps | Goals |
|---|---|---|---|
| United States | 2026 | 4 | 0 |
| Total | | 4 | 0 |
