= Omar Valencia =

Panamanian footballer (born 2004)

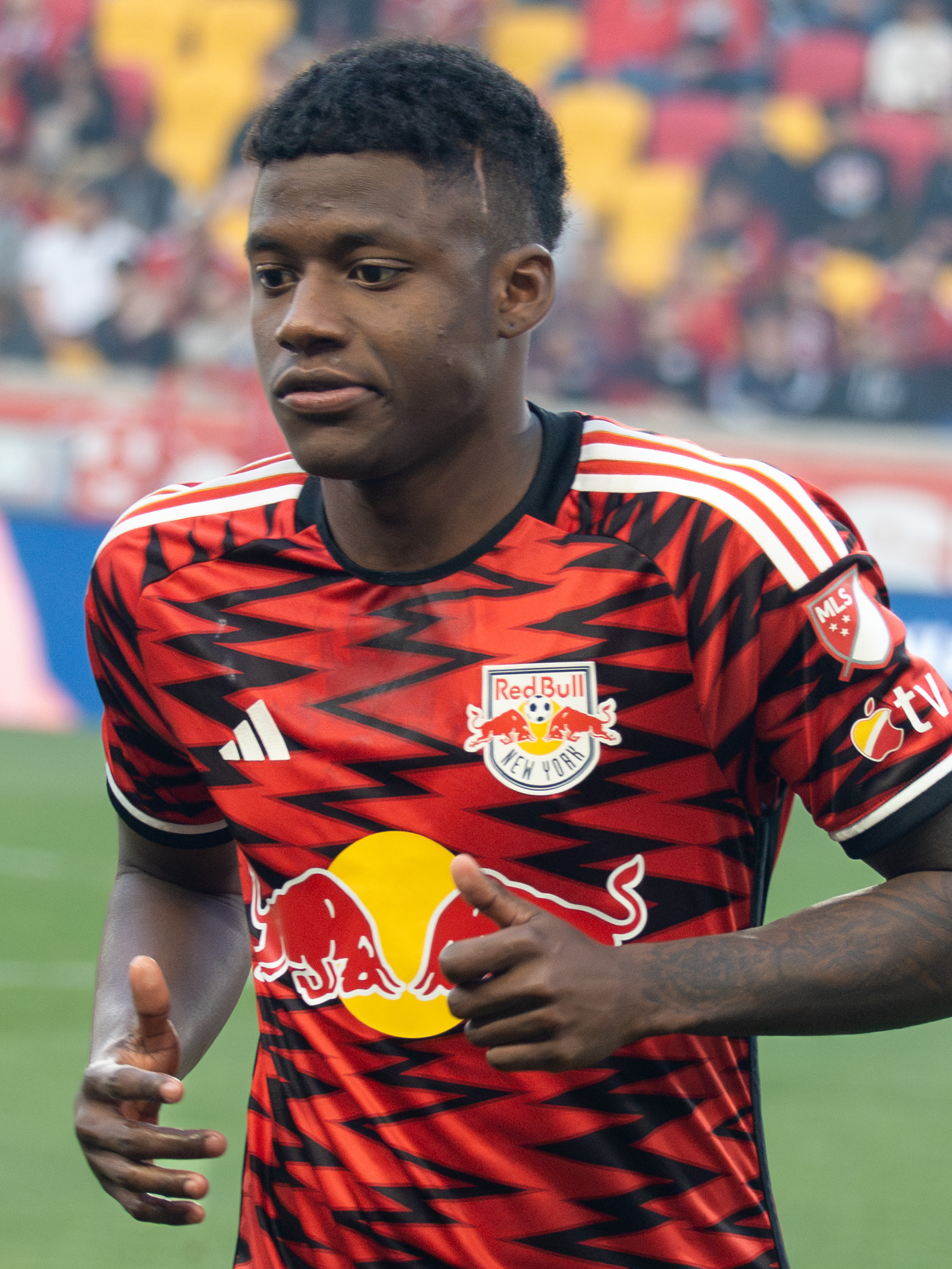
- Valencia in 2025

Personal information
- Full name: Omar Javier Valencia Arauz
- Date of birth: 8 June 2004 (age 22)
- Place of birth: Panama City, Panama
- Height: 1.80 m (5 ft 11 in)
- Position: Defender

Team information
- Current team: New York Red Bulls
- Number: 5

Youth career
- Plaza Amador

Senior career*
Years	Team	Apps	(Gls)
2022–2024	Plaza Amador	8	(0)
2022–	→ New York Red Bulls II (loan)	47	(0)
2024–	New York Red Bulls	33	(0)

International career^{‡}
2022	Panama U20	5	(0)
2023–	Panama	6	(1)
- * Club domestic league appearances and goals as of 22:24, 22 August 2026 (UTC) ‡ National team caps and goals as of 5 October 2026

Omar Javier Valencia Arauz (born 8 June 2004) is a Panamanian professional footballer who plays as a defender for Major League Soccer club New York Red Bulls and the Panama national team.

== Career ==
=== C.D. Plaza Amador ===
Born in Panama City, Valencia began his career with Panamanian club Plaza Amador. He graduated from Plaza Amador's youth setup, and made his senior debut during the 2022 Torneo Apertura. On 6 February 2022, Valencia made his league debut on matchday 1 in a 4–3 victory over Potros del Este.

==== Loan to New York Red Bulls II ====
On 11 August 2022, Valencia was loaned to Red Bulls II for the remainder of the 2022 season, their last in USL Championship. Valencia made his debut for the team on 1 October 2022, against Phoenix Rising FC.

On 8 February 2023, Red Bulls II exercised their option to extend Valencia's loan through the 2023 season, the team's first in MLS Next Pro.

On 20 March 2024, Valencia made his U.S. Open Cup debut, appearing as a starter for New York Red Bulls II in a 5–1 victory over Hudson Valley Hammers in the first round of the U.S. Open Cup.

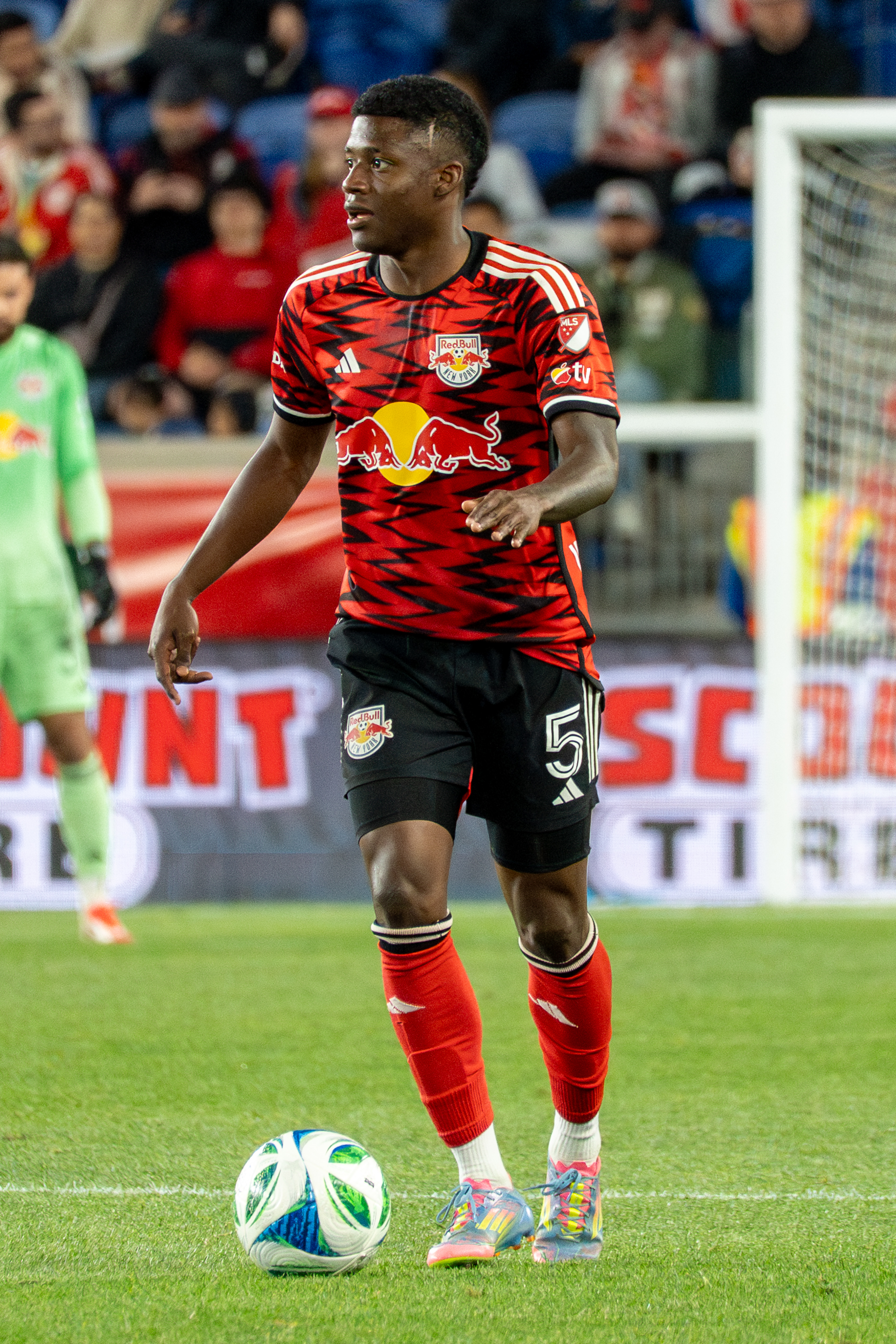
Omar Valencia with the New York Red Bulls in 2025

==== Loan to New York Red Bulls ====
On 23 March 2024, Valencia and Mohammed Sofo were both called-up to the senior New York Red Bulls roster on a short-term loan ahead of the team's Major League Soccer match against Inter Miami. On 8 June 2024, Valencia made his debut for Red Bulls, coming on in the 89th minute for Daniel Edelman.

=== New York Red Bulls ===
On 9 December 2024, New York Red Bulls announced the signing of Valencia to a first team contract. Valencia began the 2025 campaign as a starter for New York. On 1 March 2025, he recorded his first assist for the club, assisting on Emil Forsberg's goal in a 2–0 victory over Nashville SC. Valencia was selected to the MLS team of the week for matchday 7, following his performance on 5 April 2025 in a 2–1 win against Chicago Fire, a match in which he assisted on Serge Ngoma's equalizer.

== International career ==
Valencia was featured in Panama's squad at the 2022 CONCACAF U-20 Championship, earning four caps throughout the tournament. On 6 July 2023, Valencia was called up to senior Panama national team for the 2023 CONCACAF Gold Cup.

== Career statistics ==
=== Club ===
As of match played 18 October 2026

Appearances and goals by club, season and competition
Club	Season	League			National cup (Note: Includes U.S. Open Cup)		Continental		Other		Total	
Club	Season	Division	Apps	Goals	Apps	Goals	Apps	Goals	Apps	Goals	Apps	Goals
Plaza Amador	2022	Liga LPF	8	0	—		—		—		8	0
New York Red Bulls II (loan)	2022	USL Championship	3	0	0	0	—		0	0	3	0
New York Red Bulls II	2023	MLS Next Pro	15	0	0	0	—		2 (Note: Appearances in MLS Next Pro play-offs)	0	17	0
New York Red Bulls II	2024	MLS Next Pro	20	0	2	0	—		0	0	22	0
New York Red Bulls II	2025	MLS Next Pro	1	0	0	0	—		0	0	1	0
New York Red Bulls II	2026	MLS Next Pro	8	0	0	0	—		2	0	10	0
New York Red Bulls II	Total		47	0	2	0	—		4	0	53	0
New York Red Bulls	2024	MLS	1	0	—		—		—		1	0
New York Red Bulls	2025	MLS	20	0	1	0	—		1 (Note: Appearance in Leagues Cup)	0	22	0
New York Red Bulls	2026	MLS	12	0	1	0	—		—		13	0
New York Red Bulls	Total		33	0	2	0	—		1	0	36	0
Career total			88	0	4	0	0	0	5	0	97	0

=== International ===
As of match played 5 October 2026

Appearances and goals by national team and year
National team	Year	Apps	Goals
Panama	2022	1	0
Panama	2023	1	0
Panama	2024	1	0
Panama	2026	3	1
Total		6	1

List of international goals scored by Omar Valencia
No.	Date	Venue	Opponent	Score	Result	Competition
1	25 September 2026	Sree Kanteerava Stadium, Bengaluru, India	India	1–1	1–1	Friendly

== Honours ==
Panama

- CONCACAF Gold Cup runner-up: 2023
