= Julian Hall (soccer) =

American soccer player (born 2008)

- Hall with the New York Red Bulls in 2026

Personal information
- Full name: Julian Zakrzewski Hall
- Date of birth: March 24, 2008 (age 18)
- Place of birth: New York City, New York, US
- Height: 1.78 m (5 ft 10 in)
- Position: Forward

Team information
- Current team: New York Red Bulls
- Number: 16

Youth career
- –2020: New York City FC
- 2020–2023: New York Red Bulls

Senior career*
Years	Team	Apps	(Gls)
2023	New York Red Bulls II	8	(1)
2023–	New York Red Bulls	71	(16)
2023–2025	→ New York Red Bulls II (loan)	22	(10)

International career^{‡}
2022–2023	United States U15	9	(4)
2025	United States U17	7	(1)
2026–	United States	6	(5)
- * Club domestic league appearances and goals as of 00:07, November 8, 2026 (UTC) ‡ National team caps and goals as of 02:00, November 18, 2026 (UTC)

Julian Zakrzewski Hall (born March 24, 2008) is an American professional soccer player who plays as a forward for Major League Soccer club New York Red Bulls and the United States national team.

Hall is a graduate of the New York Red Bulls Academy and he signed with the New York Red Bulls first team in late 2023 after spending most of the season with their reserve affiliate, New York Red Bulls II, in MLS Next Pro. That season, he became the youngest debutant in New York Red Bulls history, and the following season he became the second youngest goalscorer of all-time in Major League Soccer.

== Early career ==
In 2020, Hall joined the New York Red Bulls Academy and played in the academy for three years, where he scored 28 goals in 39 matches played for Red Bulls Academy. He led the Red Bulls U-15's to win the 2023 U-15 MLS NEXT Cup for the first time in academy history; he scored five goals during the tournament and won the U-15 MLS NEXT Cup MVP Award. Hall won the Golden Boot Award at the 2023 Generation adidas Cup, where he scored five goals during the tournament.

== Club career ==
Ahead of the 2023 MLS Next Pro season, the reserve league of Major League Soccer, Hall signed a contract with the New York Red Bulls II. During the 2023 season, he made 10 appearances, scoring twice.

On September 7, 2023, Hall signed a three-year contract with the first team. On September 30, 2023, Hall made his MLS debut for the Red Bulls in a 1–0 home loss to Chicago Fire, in which he played for the final 10 minutes of the match, replacing Elias Manoel. Hence, he became the third-youngest MLS player, aged 15 years and 190 days, only behind Cavan Sullivan and Freddy Adu, and the youngest debutant in Red Bulls history, ahead of Eddie Gaven and Serge Ngoma.

On June 19, 2024, Hall became the second youngest MLS goalscorer behind Freddy Adu; Hall came onto the field as a substitution in the 87th-minute and scored in the 88th-minute to make the score 2–2 against CF Montréal.

On February 21, 2026, Hall scored his first brace for the senior team in a 2–1 win at Orlando City on the opening matchday of the 2026 season. The performance saw him named Player of the Matchday. On May 13, 2026, Hall became the youngest player in league history to score a hat-trick, at the age of 18 years and 50 days, in a 3–2 win over Columbus Crew.

== International career ==
Born in the United States, Hall is of Polish descent through his mother and holds dual-citizenship. He was eligible to represent both the United States and Poland national teams; however, he is now cap-tied to the United States.

Hall was one of 28 players called up to the United States national team by head coach Mauricio Pochettino for friendly matches against Peru, Chile, Mexico and Canada on September 26 and 29 and October 3 and 6 2026, respectively.

Hall made his debut for the national team on 26 September, coming on as a substitute for Justin Ellis in a 4–1 win over Peru. He scored on his debut and later assisted Sebastian Berhalter's goal for the fourth goal of the match. Three days later, Hall made his first start for the national team against Chile, scoring the equalizer with a header from a Gio Reyna cross in a 4–2 win and becoming the youngest player in USMNT history to score in each of his first two appearances. On October 3, he scored the opening goal in a 3–0 win over Mexico, again finishing from a cross from Reyna, to become the third player in USMNT history to score in each of his first three appearances, after Alex Rae in 1937 and Eddie Johnson in 2004 and 2005.

== Personal life ==
Born in New York City, New York, Julian Zakrzewski Hall joined the New York Red Bulls Academy from the New York City FC academy in 2020 at the age of 12. Hall has expressed his admiration of Robert Lewandowski, and has also cited direct wingers such as Vinícius Júnior as players he watches and learns from.

Hall was raised in Manhattan, where he continues to live with his family on the Upper West Side. His mother is Polish, and he is a dual citizen of the United States and Poland. He plays under his mother's maiden name, Zakrzewski, which appears on the back of his shirt, and his full name is Julian Zakrzewski Hall.

== Career statistics ==
=== Club ===
As of match played November 7, 2026

Appearances and goals by club, season and competition
Club	Season	League			U.S. Open Cup		Continental		Other		Total	
Club	Season	Division	Apps	Goals	Apps	Goals	Apps	Goals	Apps	Goals	Apps	Goals
New York Red Bulls II	2023	MLS Next Pro	8	1	—		—		—		8	1
New York Red Bulls	2023	MLS	1	0	0	0	—		0	0	1	0
New York Red Bulls	2024	MLS	11	2	—		—		1 (Note: Appearance(s) in Leagues Cup)	0	12	2
New York Red Bulls	2025	MLS	26	1	2	0	—		3	1	31	2
New York Red Bulls	2026	MLS	33	13	2	3	—		—		35	16
New York Red Bulls	Total		71	16	4	3	0	0	4	1	79	20
New York Red Bulls II (loan)	2023	MLS Next Pro	2	1	—		—		2 (Note: Appearances in MLS Next Pro playoffs)	1	4	2
New York Red Bulls II (loan)	2024	MLS Next Pro	16	6	1	0	—		—		17	6
New York Red Bulls II (loan)	2025	MLS Next Pro	4	3	—		—		0	0	4	3
New York Red Bulls II (loan)	Total		22	10	1	0	0	0	2	1	25	11
Career total			101	27	5	3	0	0	6	2	112	32

=== International ===
As of match played November 17, 2026

Appearances and goals by national team and year
National team	Year	Apps	Goals
United States	2026	6	5
Total		6	5

Scores and results list United States' goal tally first, score column indicates score after each Hall goal.

List of international goals scored by Julian Hall
No.	Date	Venue	Cap	Opponent	Score	Result	Competition
1	September 26, 2026	Inter.co Stadium, Orlando, United States	1	Peru	3–1	4–1	Friendly
2	September 29, 2026	Energizer Park, St. Louis, United States	2	Chile	2–2	4–2	Friendly
3	October 3, 2026	State Farm Stadium, Glendale, United States	3	Mexico	1–0	3–0	Friendly
4	November 14, 2026	Nu Stadium, Miami, United States	5	Haiti	2–0	6–0	2026–27 CONCACAF Nations League A
5	November 17, 2026	TQL Stadium, Cincinnati, United States	6	Haiti	2–0	2–0	2026–27 CONCACAF Nations League A

== Honors ==
Individual

- MLS All-Star: 2026
