= Shanga Forsberg =

Swedish footballer (born 1992)

Personal information
- Birth name: Shanga Hussain
- Date of birth: 16 August 1992 (age 34)
- Position: Defender

Senior career*
Years	Team	Apps	(Gls)
- Sundsvalls DFF
- RB Leipzig
- * Club domestic league appearances and goals

Shanga Forsberg (née Hussain, born 16 August 1992) is a Swedish former footballer who played as a defender.

== Personal life ==
Hussian was married to Swedish footballer Emil Forsberg, having first met in Sundsvall.
