= Peter Stroud (soccer) =

American soccer player (born 2002)

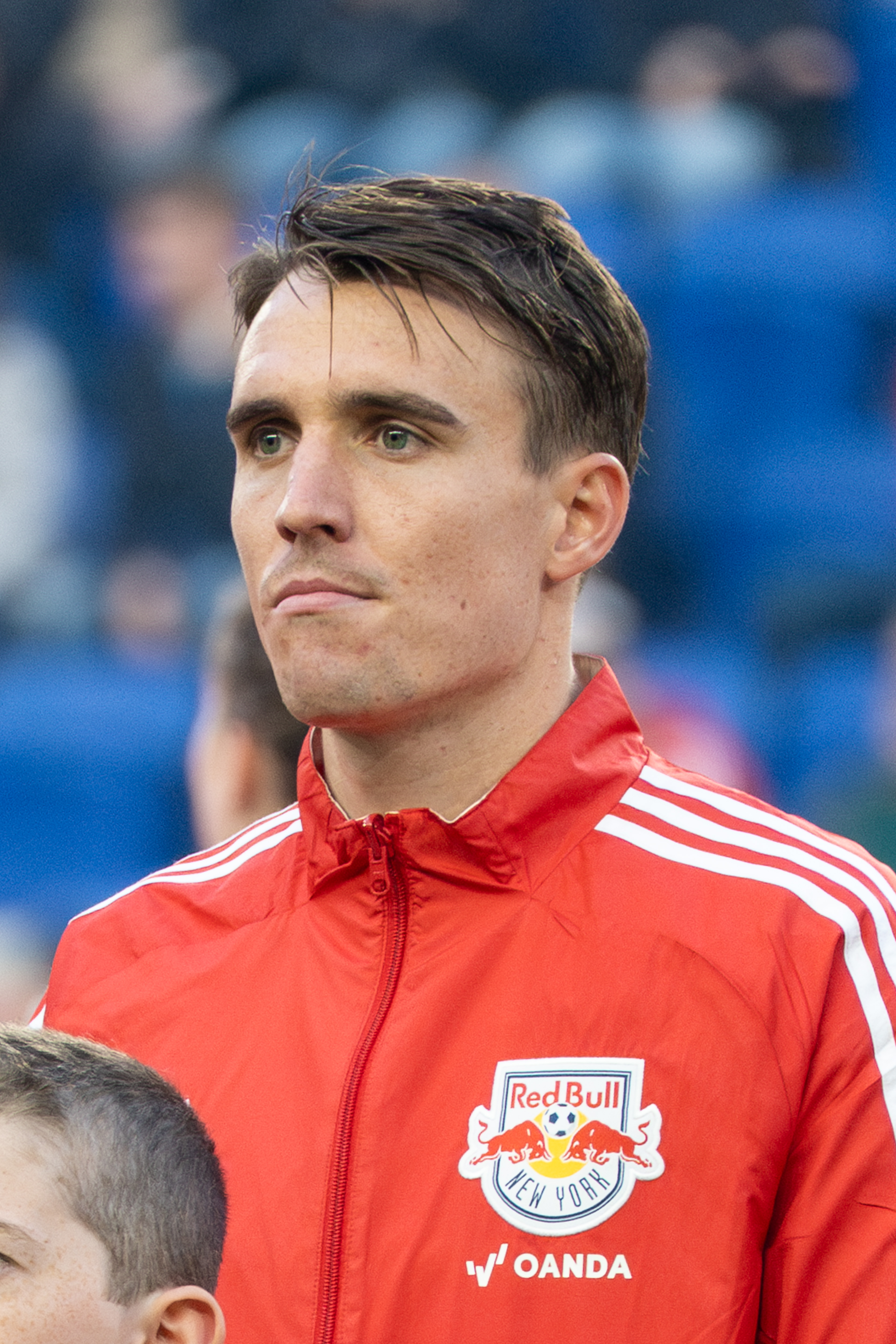
- Peter Stroud in 2025

Personal information
- Full name: Peter Forrest Stroud
- Date of birth: April 23, 2002 (age 24)
- Place of birth: Chester Township, New Jersey, US
- Height: 5 ft 10 in (1.78 m)
- Position: Midfielder

Team information
- Current team: Minnesota United
- Number: 6

Youth career
- 2015–2018: New York Red Bulls
- 2018–2020: West Ham United

College career
Years	Team	Apps	(Gls)
2020–2022	Duke Blue Devils	56	(6)

Senior career*
Years	Team	Apps	(Gls)
2021	New York Red Bulls U23	10	(0)
2022	FC Motown STA	5	(2)
2022	Tobacco Road FC	5	(4)
2023–2025	New York Red Bulls	66	(0)
2023	→ New York Red Bulls II (loan)	6	(0)
2026–	Minnesota United	0	(0)

International career
2016–2017	United States U15	12	(0)
2017–2018	United States U17	15	(0)
- * Club domestic league appearances and goals as of October 24, 2025

Peter Forrest Stroud (born April 23, 2002) is an American professional soccer player who plays as a midfielder for Major League Soccer club Minnesota United.

== Career ==
=== Youth and college ===
Stroud was born in Chester Township, New Jersey, attending Laurel Springs School. He played with the Player Development Academy at under-8's level, before moving to the New York Red Bulls academy under-12 team, where he played for three seasons. Aged sixteen, he made the move to England, joining West Ham United where he played for a further two years in their U18 and U23 sides.

Following his spell in England, Stroud returned to the United States, attending Duke University to play college soccer. In three seasons with the Blue Devils, Stroud made 56 appearances, scoring six goals and tallying twelve assists. He earned numerous awards during his time with the Blue Devils, been named All-ACC Third Team and ACC All-Freshman Team in his freshman season. ACC Midfielder of the Year, United Soccer Coaches All-American Third Team, All-ACC First Team, All-South Region First Team, and ACC All-Tournament Team in his sophomore season, and was a MAC Hermann Trophy Runner Up, United Soccer Coaches All-America First Team, ACC Midfielder of the Year, becoming the first player in ACC history to win back-to-back Midfielder of the Year awards, All-ACC First Team, and All-South Region First Team.

While at college, Stroud also played in the USL League Two with multiple teams. In 2021 he played for New York Red Bulls U23, where he made ten appearances. The following year he split time between FC Motown STA and Tobacco Road FC. He was later named the top USL League Two prospect and named to the 2022 All-League Team.

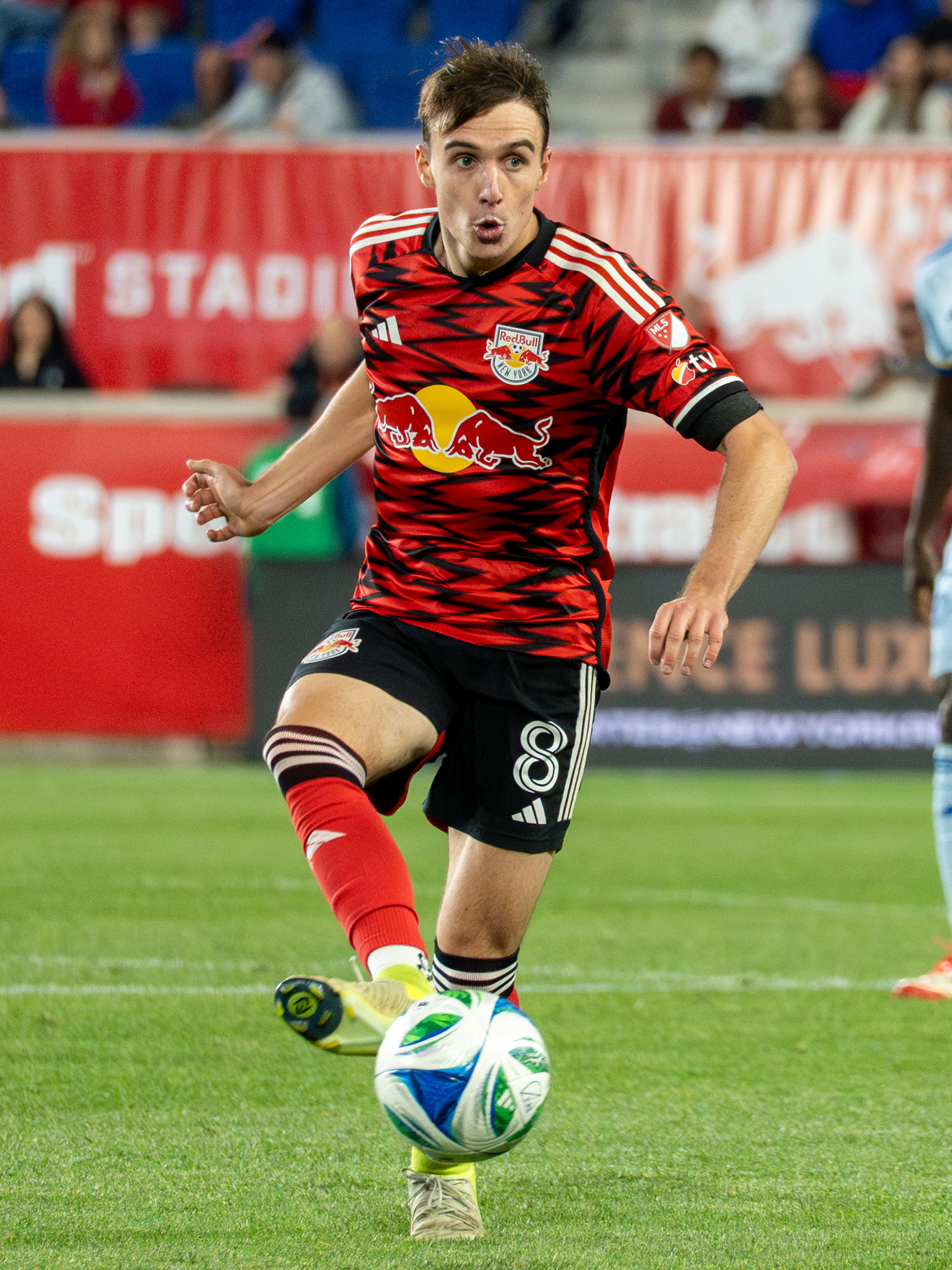
Peter Stroud with the Red Bulls in 2025

=== New York Red Bulls ===
On January 14, 2023, Stroud left college early to sign a homegrown player contract with New York Red Bulls through to 2025. He made his professional debut on February 25, 2023, appearing as a 79th–minute substitute during a 1–0 loss to Orlando City.

Early in the 2024 season Stroud cemented his place in the Red Bull midfield, starting the first eight matches of the campaign. However, on April 13, 2024, he suffered a left ankle injury in New York's match against Chicago Fire FC which required surgery, keeping him out for a significant period.

=== Minnesota United ===
On December 17. 2025, Minnesota United acquired Stroud from New York Red Bulls in exchange for $475,000 in 2026 General Allocation Money (GAM), with New York retaining a sell-on percentage should Stroud be transferred outside Major League Soccer.

== Personal life ==
Peter is the younger brother of Jared Stroud, who currently plays for D.C. United. He also has two other older brothers, Will and Dylan, who both played at the college level. He is of English descent through his father. He is in a relationship with soccer player Talia DellaPeruta.

== Career statistics ==
As of match played September 14, 2025

Appearances and goals by club, season and competition
Club	Season	League			U.S. Open Cup		Playoffs		Continental		Other		Total	
Club	Season	Division	Apps	Goals	Apps	Goals	Apps	Goals	Apps	Goals	Apps	Goals	Apps	Goals
New York Red Bulls U-23	2021	USL League Two	10	0	—		0	0	—		—		10	0
FC Motown STA	2022	USL League Two	5	2	—		0	0	—		—		5	2
Tobacco Road FC	2022	USL League Two	5	4	—		0	0	—		—		5	4
New York Red Bulls	2023	Major League Soccer	25	0	2	0	3	0	—		3 (Note: Appearances in Leagues Cup)	0	33	0
New York Red Bulls	2024	Major League Soccer	14	0	—		4	0	—		0	0	19	0
New York Red Bulls	2025	Major League Soccer	27	0	3	0	—		—		2	0	32	0
New York Red Bulls	Total		66	0	5	0	7	0	—		5	0	83	0
New York Red Bulls II (loan)	2023	MLS Next Pro	6	0	—		1	0	—		—		7	0
Career total			92	6	5	0	8	0	0	0	5	0	110	6
