= 2026 New York Red Bulls season =

New York Red Bulls
2026 season
- Head coach: Michael Bradley
- Stadium: Sports Illustrated Stadium
- Major League Soccer: Conference: 10th Overall: 22nd
- MLS Cup playoffs: Did not qualify
- U.S. Open Cup: Round of 16
- Top goalscorer: League: Julian Hall (13); All: Julian Hall (16)
Home colors	Away colors

The 2026 New York Red Bulls season was the club's 31st season in Major League Soccer, the top division of soccer in the United States.

After not making into the 2025 MLS Cup playoffs and ending the clubs' longest playoff appearance streak, the team made major adjustments on the team's leadership. Sandro Schwarz would not return to the team for 2026, officially marking an end to his two-year tenure with the Red Bulls. Julian de Guzman, who was the sporting director was promoted to Head of Sport. In December 2025, former Red Bulls player Michael Bradley was hired as permanent head coach for the 2026 season.

For the first time in team history, the New York Red Bulls would miss the playoffs in consecutive years, with the club being eliminated after a 3–2 loss to Nashville SC on November 1.

== Team information ==
=== Squad information ===
As of February 17, 2026

Appearances and goals are career totals from all-competitions.

No.	Player	Nationality	Date of Birth (Age)	Signed from	Apps	Goals	Assists
GK
21	Aidan Stokes (HG)	(United States)	January 14, 2008 (age 18)	Academy	0	0	0
1	AJ Marcucci	(United States)	August 31, 1999 (age 27)	(United States) New York Red Bulls II	2	0	0
23	John McCarthy	(United States)	July 4, 1992 (age 34)	(United States) LA Galaxy	11	0	0
34	Ethan Horvath	(United States)	June 9, 1995 (age 31)	(Wales) Cardiff City	0	0	0
DF
2	Justin Che	(United States)	November 18, 2003 (age 23)	(Denmark) Brøndby IF	0	0	0
3	Jahkeele Marshall-Rutty	(Canada)	June 16, 2004 (age 22)	(Canada) CF Montréal	0	0	0
5	Omar Valencia (INT)	(Panama)	July 25, 2003 (age 23)	(United States) New York Red Bulls II	19	0	5
6	Robert Voloder	(Germany)	May 9, 2001 (age 25)	(United States) Sporting Kansas City	0	0	0
12	Dylan Nealis	(United States)	July 30, 1998 (age 28)	(United States) Nashville SC	17	1	0
26	Tim Parker	(United States)	February 23, 1992 (age 34)	Free agent (re-signed)	13	1	0
MF
4	Gustav Berggren (INT)	(Sweden)	September 7, 1997 (age 29)	(Poland) Raków Częstochowa	5	0	0
10	Emil Forsberg (INT)	(Sweden)	October 23, 1991 (age 35)	(Germany) RB Leipzig	32	11	10
15	Adri Mehmeti (HG)	(United States)	April 6, 2009 (age 17)	Academy	0	0	0
39	Nehuén Benedetti (INT)	(Argentina)	February 24, 2005 (age 21)	(Argentina) Estudiantes	0	0	0
48	Ronald Donkor (LO) (INT)	(Ghana)	November 20, 2004 (age 22)	(Mali) Guidars FC	20	0	2
66	Tanner Rosborough (HG)	(United States)	March 21, 2008 (age 18)	Academy	0	0	0
75	Daniel Edelman (HG)	(United States)	April 28, 2003 (age 23)	Academy	25	1	0
	Brian Gutiérrez (INT)	(Mexico)	June 17, 2003 (age 23)	(Mexico) Guadalajara	0	0	0
	Wan Kuzain (INT)	(Malaysia)	September 14, 1998 (age 28)	(United States) Sporting JAX	0	0	0
FW
7	Cade Cowell (L)	(United States)	October 14, 2003 (age 23)	(Mexico) Guadalajara (loan)	0	0	0
11	Jorge Ruvalcaba (INT)	(Mexico)	July 23, 2001 (age 25)	(Mexico) UNAM Pumas	0	0	0
13	Eric Maxim Choupo-Moting (INT)	(Cameroon)	March 23, 1989 (age 37)	Free agent	32	16	5
16	Julian Hall (HG)	(United States)	March 24, 2008 (age 18)	(United States) New York Red Bulls II	25	1	0
17	Cameron Harper	(United States)	November 19, 2001 (age 25)	(Scotland) Celtic	12	3	2
22	Dennis Gjengaar (INT)	(Norway)	February 24, 2004 (age 22)	(Norway) Odd	20	2	1
33	Roald Mitchell (HG)	(United States)	January 13, 2003 (age 23)	(United States) New York Red Bulls II	0	0	0
37	Mohammed Sofo (INT)	(Ghana)	November 30, 2004 (age 21)	(United States) New York Red Bulls II	25	5	0
79	Rafael Mosquera (INT)	(Panama)	May 24, 2005 (age 21)	(Panama) Plaza Amador	1	0	0
81	Serge Ngoma (HG)	(United States)	July 9, 2005 (age 21)	Academy	19	1	0

- (HG) = Homegrown Player
- (GA) = Generation Adidas Player
- (DP) = Designated Player
- (INT) = Player using International Roster Slot
- (U22) = Player using U22 Initiative Slot
- (L) = On Loan to the club
- (LO) = Loaned out to another club
- (SEIL) = Season-ending Injury List

=== In ===
#	Pos.	Player	Signed from	Details	Date	Source
6	DF	(Germany) Robert Voloder	(United States) Sporting Kansas City	Transaction	January 12, 2026	
34	GK	(United States) Ethan Horvath	(Wales) Cardiff City	Free Transfer	January 29, 2026	
11	WG	(United States) Jorge Ruvalcaba	(Mexico) Pumas UNAM	Transfer	February 2, 2026	
	MF	(Mexico) Brian Gutiérrez	(Mexico) Guadalajara	Free Transfer	2026	
	MF	(Malaysia) Wan Kuzain	(United States) Sporting JAX	Free Transfer	2026	

=== Out ===
#	Pos.	Player	Signed by	Details	Date	Source
	DF	(Germany) Alexander Hack	(Switzerland) FC Zürich	Mutual Agreement	January 5, 2026	
24	MF	(United States) Daniel Edelman	(United States) St. Louis City SC	$850,000	January 13, 2026	
38	DF	(Sweden) Noah Eile	(England) Bristol City F.C.	Transfer	February 2, 2026	

=== Draft ===
There were no players drafted by the Red Bulls in the 2026 MLS SuperDraft.

== Preseason and friendlies ==
The Preseason schedule was announced on January 10, 2026.

January 21 Exhibition	Sarasota Paradise	3–1	New York Red Bulls	Bradenton, Florida
	Watters 37'; 31', 69'	report Sarasota Paradise Report	Rojas 64'	Stadium: IMG Academy

January 24 Exhibition	St. Louis City SC	3–1	New York Red Bulls	Bradenton, Florida
	Choupo-Moting 10'; Sofo 25'; Forsberg 37'	RBNY Report	Ceilo Pompeu 68'	Stadium: IMG Academy

January 31 Exhibition	New York Red Bulls	5–0	Hartford Athletic	Hanover, New Jersey
	Che 3'; Hall 49'; Rojas 84'; Mehmeti 89'; Bogacz 111'	Report		Stadium: New York Red Bulls Training Facility

February 7 Torneo de Tejas	FC Dallas	2–3	New York Red Bulls	Frisco, Texas
3:00 PM	Farrington, Julio		Hall, Rojas	Stadium: Toyota Stadium

February 11 Torneo de Tejas	Atlanta United FC	2–3	New York Red Bulls	Frisco, Texas
1:00 PM	Latte Lath, Own Goal		Ruvalcaba, Hall	Stadium: Toyota Stadium

February 14 Torneo de Tejas	Houston Dynamo FC	2–3	New York Red Bulls	Houston, Texas
2:00 PM	Guilherme		Ruvalcaba, Choupo-Moting	Stadium: Shell Energy Stadium

== Major League Soccer season ==
=== Eastern Conference ===
MLS Eastern Conference table (2026)
Pos	Team	Pld	W	L	T	GF	GA	GD	Pts	Qualification
1	Nashville SC	34	23	3	8	71	25	+46	77	Qualification for round one and the CONCACAF Champions Cup round one
2	Inter Miami CF	34	16	6	12	80	59	+21	60	Qualification for round one
3	New England Revolution	34	18	12	4	55	47	+8	58	Qualification for round one
4	Chicago Fire FC	34	16	11	7	64	54	+10	55	Qualification for round one
5	Charlotte FC	34	15	10	9	66	51	+15	54	Qualification for round one
6	Philadelphia Union	34	14	12	8	66	52	+14	50	Qualification for round one
7	Columbus Crew	34	14	15	5	59	52	+7	47	Qualification for round one
8	Orlando City SC	34	13	14	7	63	78	−15	46	Qualification for the wild card round
9	FC Cincinnati	34	12	12	10	67	75	−8	46	Qualification for the wild card round
10	New York Red Bulls	34	12	16	6	48	62	−14	42	
11	New York City FC	34	10	12	12	49	45	+4	42	
12	Toronto FC	34	9	13	12	52	67	−15	39	
13	Atlanta United FC	34	9	19	6	43	60	−17	33	
14	D.C. United	34	7	15	12	39	61	−22	33	
15	CF Montréal	34	6	20	8	37	69	−32	26	

Source: MLS
Rules for classification: 1) points; 2) total wins; 3) total goal differential; 4) total goals scored; 5) fewer disciplinary points; 6) away goal differential; 7) away goals scored; 8) home goals differential; 9) home goals scored; 10) coin toss (2 clubs tied) or drawing of lots (≥3 clubs tied)

=== Overall ===
Overall MLS standings table
Pos	Team	Pld	W	L	T	GF	GA	GD	Pts
20	LA Galaxy	34	11	12	11	50	57	−7	44
21	Colorado Rapids	34	12	15	7	47	50	−3	43
22	New York Red Bulls	34	12	16	6	48	62	−14	42
23	New York City FC	34	10	12	12	49	45	+4	42
24	Toronto FC	34	9	13	12	52	67	−15	39

Source: MLS
Rules for classification: 1) points; 2) total wins; 3) total goal differential; 4) total goals scored; 5) fewer disciplinary points; 6) away goal differential; 7) away goals scored; 8) home goals differential; 9) home goals scored; 10) coin toss (2 clubs tied) or drawing of lots (≥3 clubs tied)

=== Results summary ===
Overall								Home						Away					
Pld	W	D	L	GF	GA	GD	Pts	W	D	L	GF	GA	GD	W	D	L	GF	GA	GD
34	12	6	16	49	63	−14	42	7	4	7	28	30	−2	5	2	9	21	33	−12

=== Matches ===
February 21 1	Orlando City SC	1–2	New York Red Bulls	Orlando, Florida
7:30 PM	Spicer (yellow card) 45+2'; Tiago 90+6'	Report	Hall 8', 40'; Che (yellow card) 49'; Mehmeti (yellow card) 63'	Stadium: Inter&Co Stadium; Attendance: 24,453; Referee: Rubiel Vazquez

February 28 2	New York Red Bulls	1–0	New England Revolution	Harrison, New Jersey
2:30 PM	Donkor (yellow card) 21'; Hall 53'; Nealis (yellow card) 86'	Report	Yow (yellow card) 14'; Turgeman (yellow card) 39'; Raines (yellow card) 75'; Gil (yellow card) 78'	Stadium: Sports Illustrated Stadium; Attendance: 15,087; Referee: Ricardo Montero

March 8 3	New York Red Bulls	0–3	CF Montréal	Harrison, New Jersey
4:30 PM	Che (yellow card) 50'	Report	Owusu 8' (pen.); Carmona 44', 68'	Stadium: Sports Illustrated Stadium; Attendance: 16,847; Referee: Sergii Boiko

March 14 4	Toronto FC	1–1	New York Red Bulls	Toronto, Ontario
1:00 PM	Cifuentes (yellow card) 38'; Sallói 43'	Report	Dos Santos (yellow card) 22'; Voloder (yellow card) 32'; Choupo-Moting 90+8'	Stadium: BMO Field; Attendance: 18,767; Referee: Chris Penso

March 21 5	Charlotte FC	6–1	New York Red Bulls	Charlotte, North Carolina
7:30 PM	Toklomati 14'; Diani (yellow card) 19'; Vargas 46'; Biel 54'; Zaha 68'; Goodwin 77', 90+3'	Report	Berggren (red card) 53'; Donkor (yellow card) 77'; Hall 81'	Stadium: Bank of America Stadium; Attendance: 27,166; Referee: Allen Chapman

April 4 6	New York Red Bulls	4–2	FC Cincinnati	Harrison, New Jersey
7:30 PM	Hall 12'; Forsberg 48'; Donkor (yellow card) 57'; Smith 66' (o.g.); Valencia (yellow card) 83'; Sofo 90+3'	Report	Bucha 17'; Ramírez (yellow card) 37'; Smith 72'; Miazga (yellow card) 80'; Powell (red card) 90+5'	Stadium: Sports Illustrated Stadium; Attendance: 16,712; Referee: Victor Rivas

April 11 7	Inter Miami CF	2–2	New York Red Bulls	Miami, Florida
7:30 PM	Silvetti 45+2'; Berterame 55'; Fray (yellow card) 76'	Report	Ruvalcaba 15'; Cowell (yellow card) 59'; Mehmeti 77'; Mosquera (yellow card) 80'	Stadium: Nu Stadium; Attendance: 26,277; Referee: Rosendo Mendoza

April 18 8	CF Montréal	4–1	New York Red Bulls	Montreal, Quebec
2:30 PM	Loturi 5'; Owusu 39' (pen.); Longstaff 49', (yellow card) 89'; Vera (yellow card) 71'; Gillier (yellow card) 75'; Opoku 77'	Report	Mehmeti (yellow card) 34'; Ruvalcaba (yellow card) 43'; Longstaff 53' (o.g.); Donkor (yellow card) 83'	Stadium: Saputo Stadium; Attendance: 12,568; Referee: Sergii Demianchuk

April 22 9	New York Red Bulls	4–4	D.C. United	Harrison, New Jersey
7:30 PM	Hall 15'; Donkor 21'; Mehmeti (yellow card) 50'; Ruvalcaba 52', 71'	Report	Baribo 37', 59', 80'; Hopkins 54'; Peltola (yellow card) 86'; Clark (yellow card) 90'	Stadium: Sports Illustrated Stadium; Attendance: 13,309; Referee: Marcos de Oliveira

April 25 10	FC Cincinnati	2–0	New York Red Bulls	Cincinnati, Ohio
7:30 PM	Ramírez (yellow card) 31'; Denkey 40', 45+5' (pen.)	Report	Bungi (yellow card) 19'; Mehmeti (yellow card) 78'	Stadium: TQL Stadium; Attendance: 25,513; Referee: Fotis Bazakos

May 2 11	New York Red Bulls	0–2	FC Dallas	Harrison, New Jersey
7:30 PM		Report	Collodi (yellow card) 31'; Musa 54'; Sarver 88', (yellow card) 88'	Stadium: Sports Illustrated Stadium; Attendance: 20,414; Referee: Jair Marrufo

May 9 12	Chicago Fire FC	1–3	New York Red Bulls	Chicago, Illinois
2:30 PM	Haile-Selassie (yellow card) 81'; Cuypers] 87'	Report	Voloder (yellow card) 18'; Ruvalcaba 45', (yellow card) 81'; Cowell 49'; Choupo-Moting 81' (pen.); Valencia (yellow card) 90+6'	Stadium: Soldier Field; Attendance: 23,647; Referee: Allen Chapman

May 13 13	New York Red Bulls	3–2	Columbus Crew	Harrison, New Jersey
7:30 PM	Hall 7', 40', 79'; Ruvalcaba (yellow card) 68'; Valencia (yellow card) 83'; Mosquera (yellow card) 90+7'	Report	Arfsten 22'; Habroune (yellow card) 45+3'; Rossi 64' (pen.); Camacho (yellow card) 71'	Stadium: Sports Illustrated Stadium; Attendance: 14,116; Referee: Pierre-Luc Lauziere

May 16 14	New York Red Bulls	1–1	New York City FC	Harrison, New Jersey
7:30 PM	Marshall-Rutty (yellow card) 24'; Ruvalcaba 44', (yellow card) 67'; Nealis (yellow card) 82'; Parker (yellow card) 86'	Report	Gustavo (yellow card) 24'; Parks (yellow card) 49'; Perea 52'; Cavallo (yellow card) 77'	Stadium: Sports Illustrated Stadium; Attendance: 25,219; Referee: Victor Rivas

May 23 15	Sporting Kansas City	1–2	New York Red Bulls	Kansas City, Kansas
8:30 PM	Harris 64'; Berg Johnsen (yellow card) 70'	Report	Ruvalcaba 4', 45+3'; Marshall-Rutty (yellow card) 45+1'; Benedetti (yellow card) 87'	Stadium: Sporting Park; Attendance: 17,575; Referee: Nabil Bensalah

Mid-season break for 2026 FIFA World Cup

July 22 16	Philadelphia Union	3–1	New York Red Bulls	Chester, Pennsylvania
7:30 PM	Iloski 10'; Vassilev 57'; Pierre 66'	Report	Cowell 38'; Donkor (yellow card) 77'; Valencia (yellow card) 85'; Berggren (yellow card) 88'	Stadium: Subaru Park; Attendance: 18,533; Referee: Fotis Bazakos

July 25 17	New York Red Bulls	0–2	Charlotte FC	Harrison, New Jersey
7:30 PM	Ruvalcaba (yellow card) 56'; Mehmeti (yellow card) 76' (red card) 90+3'; Valencia (yellow card) 85'; Che (yellow card) 90+1'	Report	Biel 7'; Westwood 12'; Abada (yellow card) 47'	Stadium: Sports Illustrated Stadium; Attendance: 22,087; Referee: Rosendo Mendoza

August 1 18	New York Red Bulls	3–2	Orlando City SC	Harrison, New Jersey
7:30 PM	Jiménez 23', 60'; Nealis (yellow card) 27'; Forsberg 43'; Che (yellow card) 59'; Marshall-Rutty (yellow card) 90+6'	Report	Spicer 52'; Dorsey 63'; Angulo (yellow card) 69'; Sarajian (yellow card) 88'	Stadium: Sports Illustrated Stadium; Attendance: 22,104; Referee: Filip Dujic

August 15 19	Atlanta United FC	2–1	New York Red Bulls	Atlanta, Georgia
7:30 PM	Jacob (yellow card) 48'; Muyumba 69'; Picault 82', (yellow card) 83'; Báez (yellow card) 84'	Report	Forsberg 6'; Sofo (yellow card) 90+5'	Stadium: Mercedes-Benz Stadium; Attendance: 38,469; Referee: Marcos de Oliveira

August 19 20	New York Red Bulls	0–1	Nashville SC	Harrison, New Jersey
7:30 PM	Bazán (yellow card) 90+1'	Report	Lovitz (yellow card) 12'; Corcoran (yellow card) 58'; Woledzi 90+2'	Stadium: Sports Illustrated Stadium; Attendance: 15,148; Referee: Lorenzo Hernandez

August 22 21	New York Red Bulls	1–1	Chicago Fire FC	Harrison, New Jersey
7:30 PM	Sofo (yellow card) 6'; Harper 85'	Report	Barroso (yellow card) 17'; Haile-Selassie 38'; Waterman (yellow card) 64'	Stadium: Sports Illustrated Stadium; Attendance: 25,219; Referee: Sergii Demianchuk

August 29 22	New York Red Bulls	1–3	Philadelphia Union	Harrison, New Jersey
7:30 PM	Choupo-Moting 74'; Donkor (yellow card) 79'	Report	Iloski 20'; C. Sullivan 50'; Pierre 64'; Anello (yellow card) 90+1'; Q. Sullivan (yellow card) 90+2'	Stadium: Sports Illustrated Stadium; Attendance: 20,008; Referee: Drew Fischer

September 5 23	Seattle Sounders FC	0–0	New York Red Bulls	Seattle, Washington
8:30 PM	Rothrock (yellow card) 81'	Report	Donkor (yellow card) 45+3'; Che (yellow card) 50'; Bazán (yellow card) 63'	Stadium: Lumen Field; Attendance: 31,691; Referee: Ricardo Fierro

September 9 24	Los Angeles FC	2–0	New York Red Bulls	Los Angeles, California
10:30 PM	Terry 21'; Nielsen (yellow card) 42'; Raposo (yellow card) 87'; Sieb 90+6'	Report	Nealis (yellow card) 18'; Bazán (yellow card) 52'	Stadium: BMO Stadium; Attendance: 22,102; Referee: Ricardo Montero

September 12 25	Columbus Crew	0–1	New York Red Bulls	Columbus, Ohio
7:30 PM	Rodríguez (yellow card) 70'; Moreira (yellow card) 90+2'	Report	Donkor (yellow card) 69', (goal) 89'; Sofo (yellow card) 73'	Stadium: ScottsMiracle-Gro Field; Attendance: 17,448; Referee: Ramy Touchan

September 18 26	New York City FC	1–0	New York Red Bulls	New York, New York
7:30 PM	Cavallo (yellow card) 30'; O'Neill (yellow card) 55'	Report	Mehmeti (yellow card) 6'; Cowell (yellow card) 22'; Sofo (yellow card) 40'; Hall 57'	Stadium: Yankee Stadium; Attendance: 29,270; Referee: Jon Freemon

September 30 27	New York Red Bulls	0–3	St. Louis City SC	Harrison, New Jersey
7:30 PM	Forsberg (yellow card) 86'	Report	Navarro 5'; Baumgartl (yellow card) 35'; Becher 87'; Ostrák 90+1'	Stadium: Sports Illustrated Stadium; Attendance: 15,147; Referee: Rubiel Vazquez
Note: The match was originally scheduled for September 26 at 7:30 PM ET but was postponed and later rescheduled for September 30 due to inclement weather from a nor'easter.

October 10 28	New York Red Bulls	4–1	San Diego FC	Harrison, New Jersey
7:30 PM	Hall 16'; Padelford 20', (yellow card) 83'; Ruvalcaba 27'; Bazán (yellow card) 43'; Choupo-Moting 90+3'	Report	Tverskov (yellow card) 31'; Dreyer (penalty missed) 44'; Duah (yellow card) 55'; Bakambu 60'; Sargeant (yellow card) 86'	Stadium: Sports Illustrated Stadium; Attendance: 18,937; Referee: Malik Badawi

October 14 29	D.C. United	2–1	New York Red Bulls	Washington, D.C.
7:30 PM	Baribo 5' (pen.); Bartlett (yellow card) 22' (red card) 68'; Hopkins (yellow card) 29'; Hefti 45+5'	Report	Padelford (yellow card) 19'; D. Nealis (yellow card) 67'; Choupo-Moting 71'; Donkor (yellow card) 73'	Stadium: Audi Field; Attendance: 13,319; Referee: Guido Gonzales Jr.

October 17 30	New York Red Bulls	0–2	Toronto FC	Harrison, New Jersey
7:30 PM		Report	Che 3' (o.g.); Monlouis (yellow card) 52'; Morgan (yellow card) 67'; Sallói 82'; Etienne Jr. (yellow card) 87'	Stadium: Sports Illustrated Stadium; Attendance: 17,922; Referee: Marcos de Oliveira

October 24 31	New York Red Bulls	2–0	Inter Miami CF	Harrison, New Jersey
4:30 PM	Casemiro 7' (o.g.); Bazán (yellow card) 80'; Forsberg 90+1'	Report	Morales (yellow card) 90+4'	Stadium: Sports Illustrated Stadium; Attendance: 26,287; Referee: Filip Dujic

October 28 32	New England Revolution	3–2	New York Red Bulls	Foxborough, Massachusetts
7:30 PM	Turgeman 9', 46'; Feingold (yellow card) 40'; Gazdag 83'; Siqueira (yellow card) 90+3'	Report	Donkor (yellow card) 12'; Nealis (yellow card) 48'; Cowell 51'; Hall 64', (yellow card) 76'	Stadium: Gillette Stadium; Attendance: 18,611; Referee: Chris Penso

November 1 33	Nashville SC	3–2	New York Red Bulls	Nashville, Tennessee
4:30 PM	Parker 45' (o.g.); Bazán 78' (o.g.); Surridge 90+1'	Report	Cowell (penalty missed) 19'; Koné (yellow card) 25'; Hall 34'; Mosquera 40'; Ruvalcaba (yellow card) 45+2'	Stadium: Geodis Park; Attendance: 30,109; Referee: Sergii Demianchuk
Note: Originally scheduled on October 31, it was later moved to November 1.

November 7 34	New York Red Bulls	3–0	Atlanta United FC	Harrison, New Jersey
4:00 PM	Mehmeti 31'; Cowell 54'; Bazán (yellow card) 75'; Marshall-Rutty 82'	Report	Galoppo (yellow card) 68'	Stadium: Sports Illustrated Stadium; Attendance: 23,826; Referee: Pierre-Luc Lauzière

== U.S. Open Cup ==
April 15 Round of 32	New York Red Bulls (New Jersey)	3–1	(Pennsylvania) Pittsburgh Riverhounds SC	Harrison, New Jersey
7:30 PM	Forsberg 25'; Hall 28', 47'; Donkor (yellow card) 87'	Report	Amann 79'	Stadium: Sports Illustrated Stadium; Referee: Jeremy Scheer

April 29 Round of 16	New York Red Bulls (New Jersey)	1–3	(New York (state)) New York City FC	Harrison, New Jersey
7:00 PM	Hall 14'; Sofo (yellow card) 86'	Report	Trewin 9'; Raul 39'; Martins 57'; Fernández (yellow card) 90+2'	Stadium: Sports Illustrated Stadium; Attendance: 9,000; Referee: Chris Penso

== Competitions summary ==
Competition	Record							
Competition	G	W	D	L	GF	GA	GD	Win %
MLS Regular Season	15	6	4	5	25	32	−7	40.00
U.S. Open Cup	2	1	0	1	4	4	+0	50.00
Total	17	7	4	6	29	36	−7	41.18

== Player statistics ==
=== Top scorers ===
Place	Position	Number	Name	MLS	Playoffs	Open Cup	Total
1	FW	16	(United States) Julian Hall	5	0	2	7
2	MF	10	(Sweden) Emil Forsberg	1	0	1	2
3	FW	11	(Mexico) Jorge Ruvalcaba	1	0	0	1
3	FW	13	(Cameroon) Eric Maxim Choupo-Moting	1	0	0	1
3	MF	15	(Albania) Adri Mehmeti	1	0	0	1
3	MF	37	(Ghana) Mohammed Sofo	1	0	0	1
Total				10	0	2	2

As of April 18, 2026
