= Ronald Donkor =

Ghanaian footballer (born 2004)

- Donkor with New York Red Bulls in 2026

Personal information
- Date of birth: 20 November 2004 (age 21)
- Place of birth: Accra, Ghana
- Height: 1.73 m (5 ft 8 in)
- Position: Midfielder

Team information
- Current team: New York Red Bulls
- Number: 48

Youth career
- JMG Academy
- 2022–2023: Guidars FC

Senior career*
Years	Team	Apps	(Gls)
2023–	New York Red Bulls	70	(2)
2023–2025	New York Red Bulls II	22	(2)
- * Club domestic league appearances and goals as of 20:11, 15 November 2026 (UTC)

Ronald Donkor (born 20 November 2004) is a Ghanaian professional footballer who plays as a midfielder for Major League Soccer club New York Red Bulls.

== Club career ==
=== Early career ===
Born in Accra, Ghana, Donkor began his career as a youth in Mali with the JMG Academy and later professionally with Guidars FC.

=== New York Red Bulls ===
On 3 May 2023, Donkor signed with Major League Soccer side New York Red Bulls on a three-year deal. After joining the Red Bulls, Donkor also spent time with the club's MLS Next Pro side. On 26 May 2023, Donkor scored his first goal with New York Red Bulls II in a 2–1 victory over Huntsville City FC. On 4 June 2023, Donkor recorded a goal and an assist to help New York Red Bulls II to a 4–1 victory over New England Revolution II.

On 6 May 2023, Donkor made his debut with the first team, coming on for Dylan Nealis, in a 0–1 defeat to Philadelphia Union. On 24 June 2023, Donkor recorded his first MLS assist, coming on for Elias Manoel, in a 4–0 victory over Atlanta United FC. On 22 July 2023, Donkor made his Leagues Cup debut for New York, appearing as a second-half substitute in a 0–0 draw with New England Revolution. On 16 July 2025, Donkor provided three assists in New York's 5–3 victory over New England Revolution.

On 22 April 2026, Donkor scored his first goal with New York Red Bulls in a 4–4 draw with rival D.C. United. During the 2026 season, Donkor established himself as a starter for the club and on 1 June 2026 signed a three-and-a-half year contract extension.

== Career statistics ==
As of match played 6 November 2026

Appearances and goals by club, season and competition
Club	Season	League			U.S. Open Cup		Continental		Other		Total	
Club	Season	Division	Apps	Goals	Apps	Goals	Apps	Goals	Apps	Goals	Apps	Goals
New York Red Bulls	2023	Major League Soccer	3	0	0	0	—		2 (Note: Appearance(s) in Leagues Cup)	0	5	0
New York Red Bulls	2024	Major League Soccer	17	0	—		—		6 (Note: Four appearances in MLS Cup playoffs, two appearances in Leagues Cup)	0	23	0
New York Red Bulls	2025	Major League Soccer	20	0	2	0	—		2	0	24	0
New York Red Bulls	2026	Major League Soccer	30	2	2	0	—		—		32	2
New York Red Bulls	Total		70	2	4	0	—		10	0	84	2
New York Red Bulls II	2023	MLS Next Pro	16	2	0	0	—		1 (Note: Appearance in MLS Next Pro play-offs)	0	17	2
New York Red Bulls II	2024	MLS Next Pro	4	0	1	0	—		0	0	5	0
New York Red Bulls II	2025	MLS Next Pro	2	0	0	0	—		0	0	2	0
New York Red Bulls II	Total		22	2	1	0	—		1	0	24	2
Career total			92	4	5	0	0	0	11	0	108	4
