= Julián Bazán =

Colombian footballer (born 2005)

- Bazán with the New York Red Bulls in 2026

Personal information
- Full name: Julián Andrés Bazán Medina
- Date of birth: 25 November 2005 (age 20)
- Place of birth: Pereira, Colombia
- Height: 1.83 m (6 ft 0 in)
- Position: Defender

Team information
- Current team: New York Red Bulls
- Number: 14

Youth career
- –2024: Deportivo Pereira

Senior career*
Years	Team	Apps	(Gls)
2024–2026	Deportivo Pereira	21	(0)
2026–	New York Red Bulls	19	(0)
2026–	New York Red Bulls II	3	(1)

International career
2023	Colombia U18		
2024–2025	Colombia U20	24	(0)
- * Club domestic league appearances and goals as of 19:50, 15 November 2026 (UTC)

Julián Andrés Bazán Medina (born 25 November 2005) is a Colombian professional footballer who plays as a defender for Major League Soccer club New York Red Bulls.

== Club career ==
=== Deportivo Pereira ===
Born in Pereira, Colombia, Bazan began his career in the youth system of local club Deportivo Pereira. Bazán made his professional debut with Pereira on 9 April 2024, coming on as a second-half substitute in a 1–1 draw against Itagüí Leones F.C. in a Copa Colombia match. He made his league debut for the club on 6 August 2024, appearing as a starter in a 1–0 home victory against Boyacá Chicó.

On 27 August 2025, Bazán assisted Samy Merheg in the 95th on the game-winning goal against Real Cundinamarca in the Copa Colombia. With the victory, Pereira extended its unbeaten streak at home to 21 matches. In late January 2026 it was reported that A.S. Monaco was negotiating with Deportivo Pereira for Bazán.

=== New York Red Bulls ===
On 4 March 2026, it was reported that Bazán had been sold to the New York Red Bulls for 1.1 million dollars.

== International career ==
Bazán represented Colombia at the 2025 FIFA U-20 World Cup held in Chile. He helped his nation to a third-place finish in the tournament, appearing as a starter in a 1–0 victory over France on 18 October 2025.

== Career statistics ==
As of match played 6 November 2026

Appearances and goals by club, season and competition
Club	Season	League			National cup (Note: Includes Copa Colombia)		Continental		Other		Total	
Club	Season	Division	Apps	Goals	Apps	Goals	Apps	Goals	Apps	Goals	Apps	Goals
Deportivo Pereira	2024	Categoría Primera A	6	0	3	0	—		—		9	0
Deportivo Pereira	2025	Categoría Primera A	8	0	3	0	—		—		11	0
Deportivo Pereira	2026	Categoría Primera A	7	0	0	0	—		—		7	0
Deportivo Pereira	Total		21	1	6	0	—		—		27	0
New York Red Bulls	2026	Major League Soccer	19	0	0	0	—		—		19	0
New York Red Bulls II	2026	MLS Next Pro	3	1	—		—		0	0	3	1
Career total			43	1	6	0	0	0	0	0	49	1

== Honours ==
Colombia U20

- FIFA U-20 World Cup third place: 2025
