= Justin Che =

American soccer player (born 2003)

- Che with the New York Red Bulls in 2026

Personal information
- Full name: Justin Isiah Che
- Date of birth: November 18, 2003 (age 22)
- Place of birth: Richardson, Texas, United States
- Height: 6 ft 1 in (1.85 m)
- Positions: Right-back; center-back

Team information
- Current team: New York Red Bulls
- Number: 2

Youth career
- 2009–2020: FC Dallas

Senior career*
Years	Team	Apps	(Gls)
2020	North Texas SC	16	(0)
2020–2023	FC Dallas	15	(0)
2021	→ Bayern Munich II (loan)	8	(0)
2022–2023	→ TSG Hoffenheim (loan)	2	(0)
2022–2023	→ TSG Hoffenheim II (loan)	24	(1)
2023–2025	Brøndby	1	(0)
2023–2024	→ ADO Den Haag (loan)	21	(0)
2025	→ Patro Eisden (loan)	15	(0)
2026–	New York Red Bulls	20	(0)

International career
2021–2023	United States U20	10	(1)
- * Club domestic league appearances and goals as of November 15, 2026

Justin Isiah Che (born November 18, 2003) is an American professional soccer player who plays as a right-back and center-back for Major League Soccer club New York Red Bulls.

== Club career ==
=== FC Dallas ===
Che joined the FC Dallas academy in 2009. During 2020, Che played with the FC Dallas USL League One affiliate side, North Texas SC, where he earned 2020 USL League One All-League Team honors at the end of the season. Che subsequently signed a homegrown player deal with FC Dallas on October 2, 2020.

==== Bayern Munich (loan) ====
On January 5, 2021, Che was one of six FC Dallas players who went on a three-week training stint with German Bundesliga side Bayern Munich. On February 12, he joined Bayern Munich II on loan. On June 15, it was announced that Che would return to FC Dallas.

==== Hoffenheim (loan) ====
On January 21, 2022, it was announced Che had been loaned to Bundesliga club Hoffenheim from FC Dallas. On March 19, 2022, Che made his Bundesliga debut, coming on as a second half substitute in a match against Hertha Berlin. While with the club, Che played primarily with the reserve side 1899 Hoffenheim II in the Regionalliga, making 24 appearances and scoring 1 goal.

=== Brøndby ===
In July 2023, Che signed for Danish Superliga club Brøndby.

Shortly after, on August 17, 2023, Che joined Eerste Divisie club ADO Den Haag on a season-long loan deal. The move spawned criticism from some supporters, as the deal happened between two of David Blitzer's stakeholder clubs. Che made his debut for Den Haag on August 25, 2023, appearing as a starter in a 2-1 victory over FC Den Bosch. He was a regular while with the club, making 23 appearances.

Che returned to Brøndby at the end of the season. He made his only appearance for Brøndby on November 3, 2024, coming on as a second half substitute in a 5-1 victory over FC Midtjylland.

On February 3, 2025, on transfer deadline day, Che joined Belgian Challenger Pro League club Patro Eisden on a season-long loan deal. A few days later, on February 8, 2025, Che made his debut for Patro Eisden, appearing as a starter in a 1-0 victory over Jong Genk. Che became a regular starter for the Belgian side, appearing as a starter in 15 consecutive matches.

=== New York Red Bulls ===
On December 16, 2025, the New York Red Bulls announced they had signed Che to a three-year contract through 2028 with an option to 2029. The transfer fee was undisclosed.

== International career ==
Che received his first call-up to the United States national team ahead of a friendly against Switzerland on May 20, 2021, but did not feature in the match.

== Personal life ==
Justin Che was born in the United States to a Cameroonian father and a German-Russian mother. His mother was born in Russia but raised in Germany, where her parents currently reside, and both her father and mother have German citizenship. Justin holds a German as well as an American passport. He is eligible for the national teams of the United States, Cameroon, Russia, and Germany.

== Career statistics ==
As of match played October 17, 2026

Appearances and goals by club, season and competition
Club	Season	League			National cup (Note: Includes DFB-Pokal, KNVB Cup)		Continental		Other		Total	
Club	Season	Division	Apps	Goals	Apps	Goals	Apps	Goals	Apps	Goals	Apps	Goals
North Texas SC	2020	USL League One	16	0	—		—		—		16	0
FC Dallas	2021	Major League Soccer	15	0	0	0	—		—		15	0
Bayern Munich II	2020–21	3. Liga	8	0	—		—		—		8	0
1899 Hoffenheim (loan)	2021–22	Bundesliga	2	0	0	0	—		—		2	0
1899 Hoffenheim (loan)	2022–23	Bundesliga	0	0	1	0	—		—		1	0
1899 Hoffenheim (loan)	Total		2	0	1	0	0	0	0	0	3	0
1899 Hoffenheim II (loan)	2021–22	Regionalliga Südwest	6	0	—		—		—		6	0
1899 Hoffenheim II (loan)	2022–23	Regionalliga Südwest	18	1	—		—		—		18	1
1899 Hoffenheim II (loan)	Total		24	1	—		—		—		24	1
Brøndby	2024–25	Danish Superliga	1	0	0	0	0	0	—		1	0
ADO Den Haag (loan)	2023–24	Eerste Divisie	21	0	2	0	—		—		23	0
Patro Eisden (loan)	2024–25	Challenger Pro League	15	0	0	0	—		—		15	0
New York Red Bulls	2026	Major League Soccer	20	0	0	0	—		—		20	0
Career total			122	1	3	0	0	0	0	0	125	1

== Honors ==
Individual

- USL League One All-League Team: 2020
