= Mohammed Sofo =

Ghanaian footballer (born 2004)

- Sofo with New York Red Bulls in 2026

Personal information
- Date of birth: 30 November 2004 (age 21)
- Place of birth: Accra, Ghana
- Height: 1.75 m (5 ft 9 in)
- Position: Forward

Team information
- Current team: New York Red Bulls
- Number: 37

Youth career
- JMG Academy
- 2022–2023: Guidars FC

Senior career*
Years	Team	Apps	(Gls)
2023–2025	New York Red Bulls II	31	(8)
2024–	New York Red Bulls	51	(5)
- * Club domestic league appearances and goals as of 20:04, 15 November 2026 (UTC)

Mohammed Sofo (born 30 November 2004) is a Ghanaian professional footballer who plays as a forward for Major League Soccer club New York Red Bulls.

== Club career ==
=== Early career ===
Born in Accra, Ghana, Sofo began his career as a youth in Mali with the JMG Academy and later professionally with Guidars FC.

=== New York Red Bulls II ===
On 2 June 2023, Sofo joined MLS Next Pro side New York Red Bulls II on a loan from Guidars FC of Mali. On 13 August 2023, Sofo scored his first goal for New York Red Bulls II in a 5–0 victory over Columbus Crew II. On 1 September 2023, Sofo opened the scoring for New York in a 3–0 victory over Toronto FC II.

On 20 March 2024, Sofo scored his first goal of the season for New York in a 5–1 victory over Hudson Valley Hammers in the first round of the U.S. Open Cup.

=== New York Red Bulls ===
Sofo and Omar Valencia were both added to the New York Red Bulls roster on 23 March 2024, ahead of the team's Major League Soccer match against Inter Miami. On 7 September 2024, Sofo was signed to a first team contract. On 1 March 2025, Sofo scored his first goal for New York Red Bulls in a 2–0 victory over Nashville SC. On 7 May 2025, Sofo scored twice in a 4–1 victory over Colorado Springs Switchbacks FC, helping his club advance in the Lamar Hunt U.S. Open Cup.

== Career statistics ==
As of match played 28 October 2026

Appearances and goals by club, season and competition
Club	Season	League			U.S. Open Cup		Continental		Other		Total	
Club	Season	Division	Apps	Goals	Apps	Goals	Apps	Goals	Apps	Goals	Apps	Goals
New York Red Bulls II	2023	MLS Next Pro	12	2	0	0	—		1 (Note: Appearance in MLS Next Pro play-offs)	0	13	2
New York Red Bulls II	2024	MLS Next Pro	18	6	2	1	—		0	0	20	7
New York Red Bulls II	2025	MLS Next Pro	1	0	0	0	—		0	0	1	0
New York Red Bulls II	Total		31	8	2	1	—		1	0	34	9
New York Red Bulls	2024	Major League Soccer	1	0	—		0	0	—		1	0
New York Red Bulls	2025	Major League Soccer	25	4	2	3	0	0	3 (Note: Appearances in Leagues Cup)	0	30	7
New York Red Bulls	2026	Major League Soccer	25	1	2	0	—		—		27	1
New York Red Bulls	Total		51	5	4	3	0	0	3	0	58	8
Career total			82	13	6	4	0	0	4	0	92	17
