= Marcelo Morales =

Chilean footballer (born 2003)

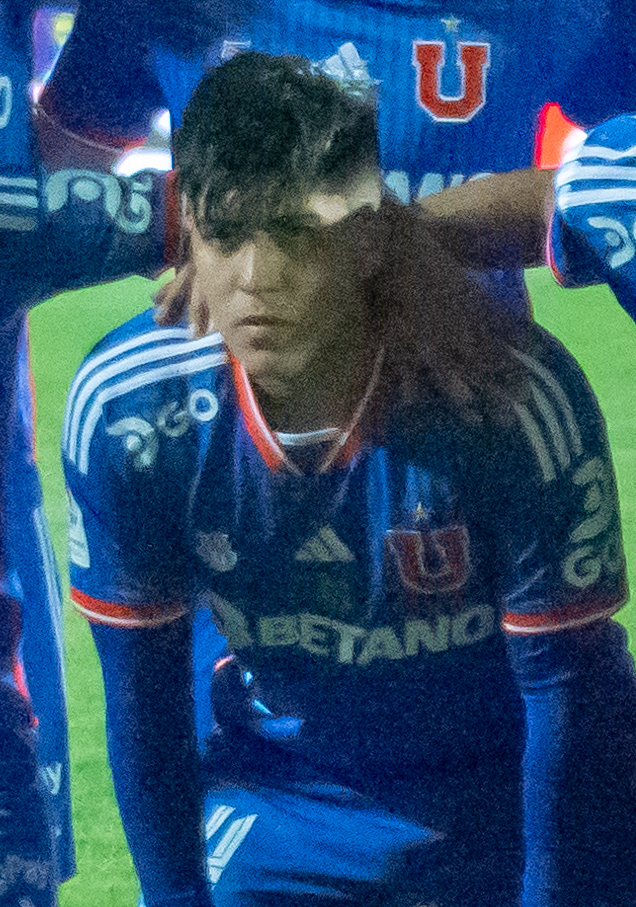
- Morales with Universidad de Chile in 2023

Personal information
- Full name: Marcelo Ariel Morales Suárez
- Date of birth: 6 June 2003 (age 23)
- Place of birth: Santiago, Chile
- Height: 1.77 m (5 ft 10 in)
- Position: Left-back

Team information
- Current team: Universidad de Chile (on loan from New York Red Bulls)
- Number: 14

Youth career
- 2011–2020: Universidad de Chile

Senior career*
| Years | Team | Apps | (Gls) |
| 2020–2024 | Universidad de Chile | 95 | (1) |
| 2025– | New York Red Bulls | 4 | (0) |
| 2025 | New York Red Bulls II | 8 | (1) |
| 2026– | → Universidad de Chile (loan) | 21 | (1) |

International career^{‡}
| 2021–2025 | Chile U20 | 10 | (0) |
| 2022 | Chile U23 | 1 | (0) |
| 2024– | Chile | 3 | (0) |
- * Club domestic league appearances and goals as of 20:25, 15 November 2026 (UTC) ‡ National team caps and goals as of 15:46, 14 October 2026 (UTC)

Marcelo Ariel Morales Suárez (born 6 June 2003) is a Chilean professional footballer who plays as a left-back for Universidad de Chile on loan from Major League Soccer club New York Red Bulls and the Chile national team.

== Club career ==
=== Universidad de Chile ===
Born in San Miguel, Morales joined Universidad de Chile at the under-8 level in 2011, and made his professional debut at the age of 17 in a Primera División match against Universidad de Concepción on 29 October 2020. At international level, he made his debut in a 2021 Copa Libertadores match against San Lorenzo played in Argentina on 18 March 2021.

On 31 March 2024, Morales scored his first league goal for Universidad de Chile, in a 3–1 victory over Cobreloa. On 20 November 2024, Morales helped Universidad de Chile in capturing its 6th Copa Chile title, in a 1–0 victory over Ñublense. At the conclusion of the season, Morales was named to the 2024 Chilean Primera División Team of the Season.

=== New York Red Bulls ===
On 6 February 2025, New York Red Bulls signed Morales for an undisclosed fee on a deal until 2028. Morales initially was sent to reserve side New York Red Bulls II to help him regain his form after a long absence due to injury. On 4 June 2025, he scored his first goal of the season in a 5–2 victory over Crown Legacy FC.

==== Universidad de Chile (loan) ====
On 28 January 2026, Morales returned to Universidad de Chile on a one-year loan with an option to buy.

== International career ==
In December 2021, he represented Chile U20 at the friendly tournament Copa Rául Coloma Rivas, playing three matches, and at the friendly match versus Peru U20 on 12 July 2022. In 2023, he made two appearances in the South American U20 Championship.

He represented Chile at under-23 level in a 1–0 win against Peru U23 on 31 August 2022, in the context of preparations for the 2023 Pan American Games.

Morales received his first call-up to the Chile senior team for the 2026 FIFA World Cup qualification matches against Brazil and Colombia in October 2024. He made his debut in the first match on 10 October.

== Career statistics ==
=== Club ===
As of match played 8 November 2026

Appearances and goals by club, season and competition
| Club | Season | League | | | National cup (Note: includes Copa Chile) | | Continental | | Other | | Total | |
| Club | Season | Division | Apps | Goals | Apps | Goals | Apps | Goals | Apps | Goals | Apps | Goals |
|---|---|---|---|---|---|---|---|---|---|---|---|---|
| Universidad de Chile | 2020 | Chilean Primera División | 1 | 0 | — | | — | | — | | 1 | 0 |
| Universidad de Chile | 2021 | Chilean Primera División | 26 | 0 | 1 | 0 | 1 (Note: Appearances in Copa Libertadores) | 0 | — | | 28 | 0 |
| Universidad de Chile | 2022 | Chilean Primera División | 20 | 0 | 4 | 0 | — | | — | | 24 | 0 |
| Universidad de Chile | 2023 | Chilean Primera División | 21 | 0 | 2 | 1 | — | | — | | 23 | 1 |
| Universidad de Chile | 2024 | Chilean Primera División | 27 | 1 | 6 | 0 | — | | — | | 33 | 1 |
| Universidad de Chile | Total | | 95 | 1 | 13 | 1 | 1 | 0 | — | | 109 | 2 |
| New York Red Bulls | 2025 | MLS | 4 | 0 | 0 | 0 | — | | 1 (Note: Appearance in Leagues Cup) | 0 | 5 | 0 |
| New York Red Bulls II | 2025 | MLS Next Pro | 8 | 1 | — | | — | | — | | 8 | 1 |
| Universidad de Chile (loan) | 2026 | Chilean Primera División | 21 | 1 | 5 | 0 | 1 (Note: Appearance in Copa Sudamericana) | 0 | 6 (Note: Appearances in Copa de la Liga) | 1 | 33 | 2 |
| Career total | | | 128 | 3 | 18 | 1 | 2 | 0 | 7 | 1 | 155 | 5 |

=== International ===
As of match played 29 September 2026

Appearances and goals by national team and year
| National team | Year | Apps | Goals |
|---|---|---|---|
| Chile | 2024 | 2 | 0 |
| Chile | 2025 | 0 | 0 |
| Chile | 2026 | 1 | 0 |
| Total | | 3 | 0 |

== Honours ==
Universidad de Chile

- Copa Chile: 2024

Individual

- Chilean Primera División Ideal Team: 2024
