= Emil Forsberg =

Swedish footballer (born 1991)

- Forsberg with the New York Red Bulls in 2026

Personal information
- Full name: Emil Peter Forsberg
- Date of birth: 23 October 1991 (age 35)
- Place of birth: Sundsvall, Sweden
- Height: 1.78 m (5 ft 10 in)
- Positions: Attacking midfielder; left winger

Team information
- Current team: New York Red Bulls
- Number: 10

Youth career
- –2008: GIF Sundsvall

Senior career*
Years	Team	Apps	(Gls)
2009–2012	GIF Sundsvall	97	(24)
2009	→ Medskogsbrons BK (loan)	3	(2)
2013–2015	Malmö FF	57	(19)
2015–2023	RB Leipzig	243	(48)
2024–	New York Red Bulls	83	(24)

International career
2009–2010	Sweden U19	8	(0)
2014–2025	Sweden	92	(21)
- * Club domestic league appearances and goals as of 19:40, 15 November 2026 (UTC)

Emil Peter Forsberg (Swedish pronunciation: [ˈěːmɪl ˈfɔ̂ʂːbærj]; born 23 October 1991) is a Swedish professional footballer who plays as an attacking midfielder or left winger for Major League Soccer club New York Red Bulls.

He previously played for GIF Sundsvall, Malmö FF, and most notably RB Leipzig, whom he played with for eight years. Forsberg was awarded Guldbollen in 2021 as Sweden's best footballer of the year. He has also been voted the Swedish Midfielder of the Year five times (2016, 2017, 2019, 2021 and 2022).

A full international from 2014 to 2025, Forsberg won 92 caps and scored 21 total goals for the Sweden national team. He was a member of the Sweden squad that reached the quarter-finals of the 2018 FIFA World Cup, and also represented his country at UEFA Euro 2016 and 2020, the latter of which he scored four goals in four games. He is known for his quick, effective passing style, and is a creative playmaker renowned for his ability to create chances and assists.

== Club career ==
=== GIF Sundsvall ===
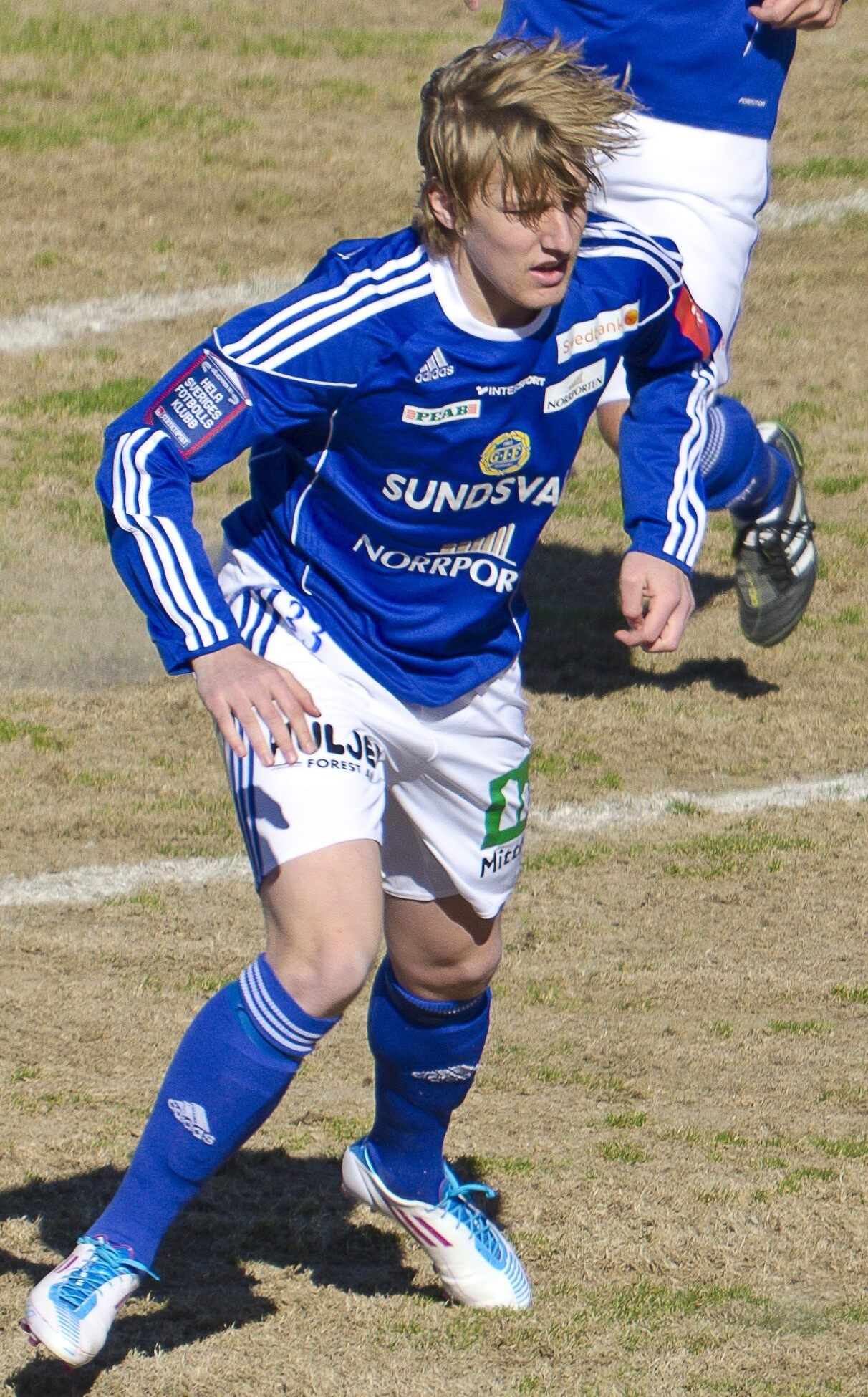
Forsberg playing for GIF Sundsvall in 2011

Born in Sundsvall, Forsberg started his career with his home-town team and joined the first team squad in 2009 when the club was playing in Sweden's second tier of football, Superettan. He went on to play several matches for Sundsvall in his first season. For his second season at the club he had become a regular in the starting eleven at Sundsvall and played 30 out of 30 matches for the 2010 season. Forsberg had started to produce goals during his second season at the club but raised his performance for the 2011 season when he scored 11 goals in 27 matches as Sundsvall were promoted to Sweden's first tier of football, Allsvenskan. For his first season in Allsvenskan Forsberg played 21 matches out of 30 and scored 6 goals, however Sundsvall were relegated to Superettan once again after losing the relegation play-offs against Halmstads BK.

=== Malmö FF ===
On 10 December 2012, Forsberg was presented as a Malmö player. He joined the club on 1 January 2013 when the transfer window opened in Sweden. Forsberg signed a four-year contract lasting until the end of the 2016 season. His first season at the club proved to be a success as he played 28 matches out of 30 and scored five goals for the club as they won the league title. He also played all matches for the club during the qualification stage for the 2013–14 UEFA Europa League and scored two goals. During Malmö FF's successful 2014 season Forsberg made 29 league appearances, scoring 14 goals and thus being an important part in the team that defended the league title. He also participated in all of the club's matches in the 2014–15 UEFA Champions League campaign in which Malmö FF qualified for the group stage. As recognition of Forsberg's feats during the season he won the award for Allsvenskan Midfielder of the year. He was also nominated for Swedish midfielder of the year at Fotbollsgalan.

=== RB Leipzig ===
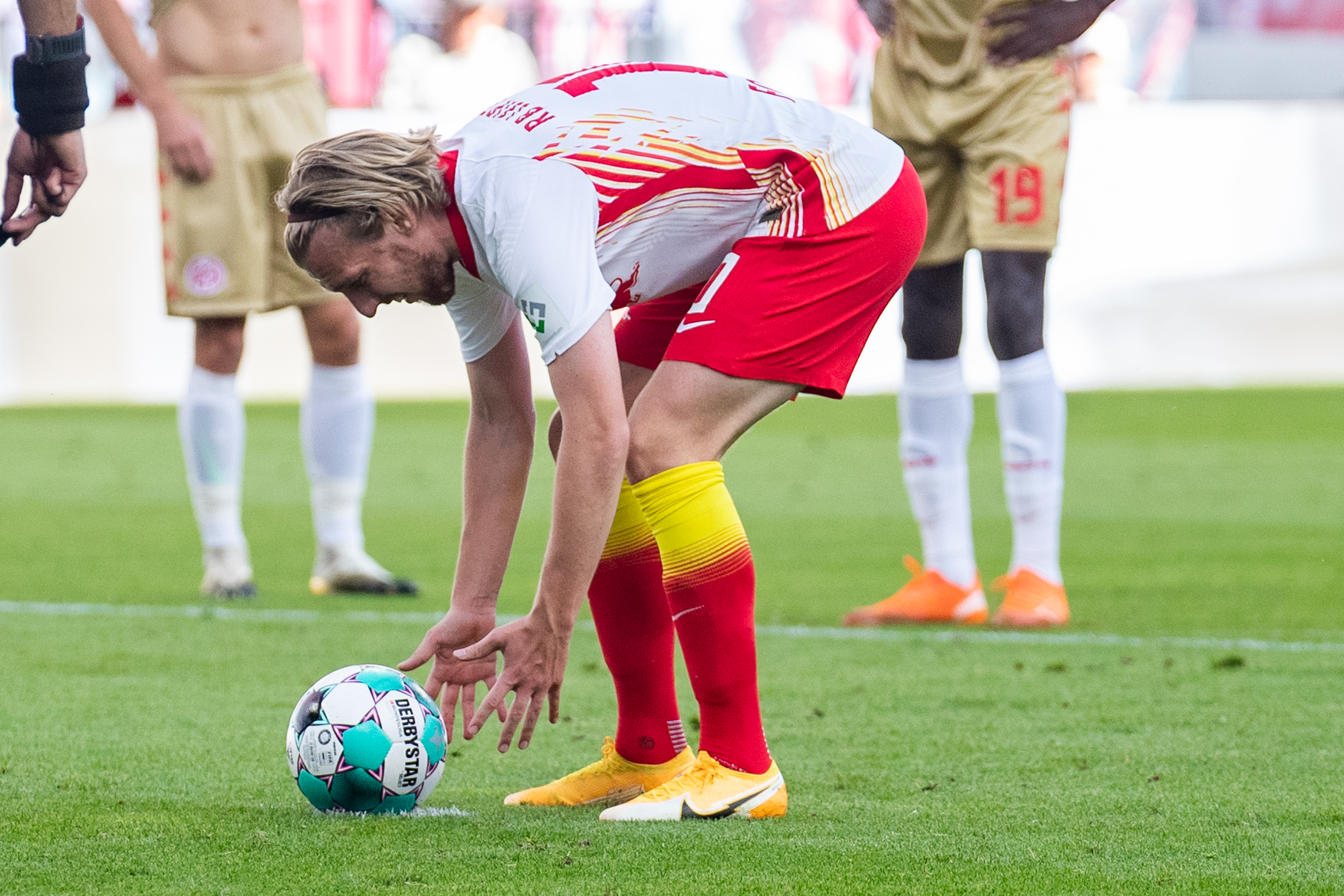
Forsberg preparing to take a penalty kick for RB Leipzig

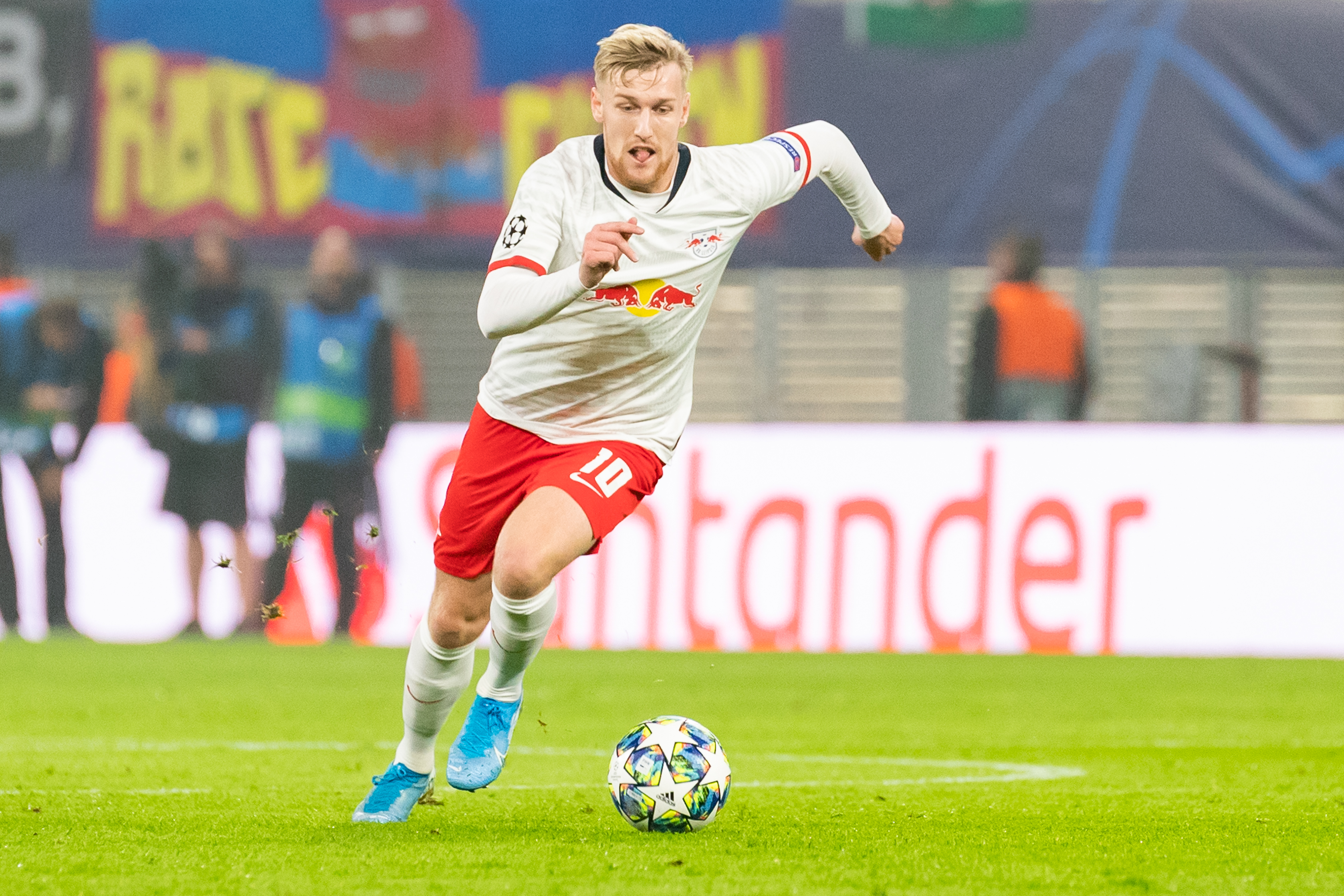
Forsberg in a Champions League match with Leipzig in 2019

In January 2015, Forsberg joined German second-league side RB Leipzig on a three-and-a-half-year deal. In February 2016, he extended his contract until 2021. During the 2015–16 season Forsberg was voted the best player in 2. Bundesliga and in January 2016 Liverpool were reportedly eyeing Forsberg. In round three of 2016–17 Bundesliga Forsberg was named player of the round by Kicker. At the end of the 2016–17 season, Forsberg finished off as the highest assister in the Bundesliga and top 5 leagues in Europe with 22 assists, and made the Bundesliga team of the season. On 13 September 2017, Forsberg scored RB Leipzig's first ever Champions League goal in their first match ever in a 1–1 draw against Monaco.

In the 2019–20 season, he scored a brace in the stoppage time in a 2–2 draw against Benfica, to secure a place for RB Leipzig in the 2019–20 UEFA Champions League knockout phase, where they managed to reach the semi-finals until they lost to Paris Saint-Germain. On 4 November 2020, Forsberg scored the winning goal in a 2–1 win over Paris Saint-Germain in the 2020–21 UEFA Champions League, to be his club's first victory against the latter. On 24 February 2022, he scored a penalty in the 89th minute to secure a 3–1 away victory over Real Sociedad during the Europa League knockout round play-offs, which marked the 1000th goal in club's history.

In his final home match for Leipzig on 16 December 2023, Forsberg came off the bench and scored the game winner and assisted another goal in a 3–1 victory over Hoffenheim. Forsberg was received by fans with banners in the crowds paying homage to their departing player. He made his final appearance for the club three days later in a 1–1 draw with Werder Bremen. He captained the side and provided the assist for Loïs Openda's goal.

=== New York Red Bulls ===
On 16 December 2023, Major League Soccer side New York Red Bulls announced that Forsberg would join the club in 2024, signing a contract until 2026, with an option for a further year. On 25 February 2024, Forsberg made his debut for New York, appearing as a starter in the opening match of the season, a 0–0 draw against Nashville SC. On 9 March 2024, Forsberg scored his first goal for New York and assisted another, in a 2–1 victory over FC Dallas. On 29 May 2024, Forsberg scored two goals for New York in a 3–1 victory over Charlotte FC.

== International career ==
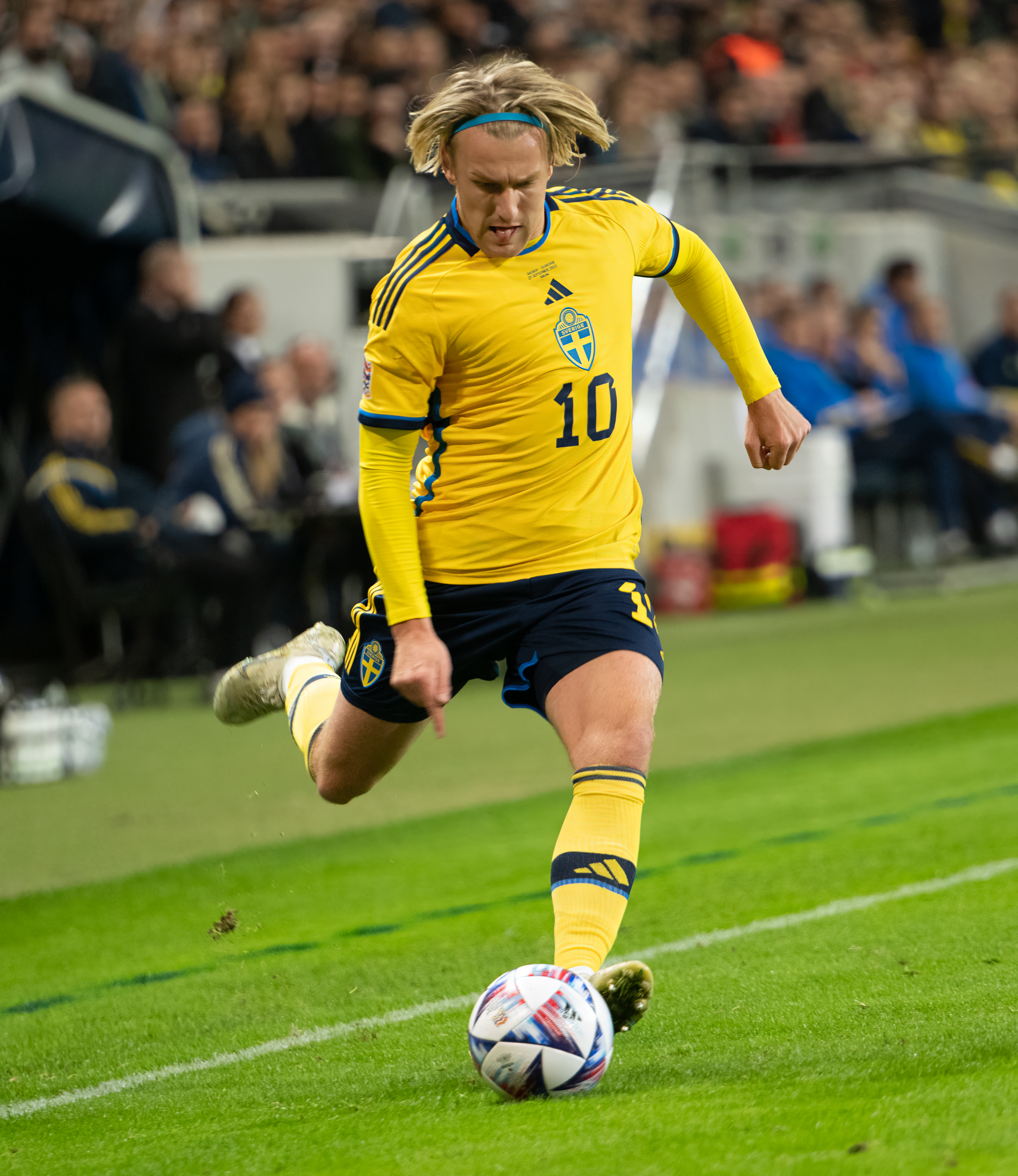
Forsberg with Sweden in a Nations League match in 2022

=== Early career ===
Having previously played for the Sweden under-19 team, Emil Forsberg made his senior international debut for the Sweden national team in a 2–1 friendly win over Moldova on 17 January 2014.

=== UEFA Euro 2016 ===
He made his competitive debut in a UEFA Euro 2016 qualifier against Liechtenstein on 12 October 2014. He scored his first international goal for Sweden in the UEFA Euro 2016 qualifying play-offs against Denmark, helping Sweden beat the Danes 4–3 on aggregate and qualify for Euro 2016. Forsberg played in all three games for Sweden at Euro 2016 as Sweden was eliminated in the group stage.

=== 2018 FIFA World Cup ===
In May 2018, he was named in Sweden's 23 man squad for the 2018 FIFA World Cup in Russia. On 3 July 2018 in a round of 16 tie between Sweden and Switzerland Forsberg scored the winner for Sweden to send them into the quarter-finals of the World Cup for the first time in almost a quarter of a century. After the match, Forsberg described scoring the goal that sent Sweden into the quarter-finals as "the greatest moment of my life", adding that it was something he had dreamed of as a child.

=== UEFA Euro 2020 ===
Forsberg was included in Sweden's 26-man squad for UEFA Euro 2020. Forsberg scored four goals in the tournament, and hit both the crossbar and the post in the Round of 16 game against Ukraine when Sweden lost 2–1 after extra-time, for his performances, he received praise as one of the best players in the tournament. He is the only Swedish player to have scored four goals in a UEFA European Championship, beating Tomas Brolin's (in 1992) and Henrik Larsson's (in 2004) previous record of three goals.

=== 2026 FIFA World Cup and Retirement ===
On 12 May 2026, Forsberg was left out of the Sweden squad for the 2026 FIFA World Cup in North America. On 25 June 2026, Forsberg announced his retirement from the Sweden national team, having won 92 caps and scored 21 goals between 2014 and 2025.

== Personal life ==
Emil Forsberg is the son of former GIF Sundsvall player Leif Forsberg, and grandson of Lennart Forsberg who also played for GIF Sundsvall. On 17 July 2016, Forsberg married Shanga Hussain, who is a former footballer. The couple lived in Leipzig, having first met in Sundsvall. They had their first child in August 2018. The couple divorced in 2024. Forsberg is currently in a relationship with Swedish Fanny Ernestam, who is an athlete competing in triple jump for KFUM Örebro.

Forsberg has named Dutch winger Ryan Babel as a player he has looked up to.

== Career statistics ==
=== Club ===
As of match played 7 November 2026

Appearances and goals by club, season and competition
Club	Season	League			National cup (Note: Includes Svenska Cupen, DFB-Pokal, U.S. Open Cup)		Continental		Other		Total	
Club	Season	Division	Apps	Goals	Apps	Goals	Apps	Goals	Apps	Goals	Apps	Goals
GIF Sundsvall	2009	Superettan	19	1	1	0	—		—		20	1
GIF Sundsvall	2010	Superettan	30	6	2	0	—		2 (Note: Appearance(s) in Allsvenskan promotion/relegation play-offs)	0	34	6
GIF Sundsvall	2011	Superettan	27	11	2	3	—		—		29	14
GIF Sundsvall	2012	Allsvenskan	21	6	1	0	—		1	0	23	6
GIF Sundsvall	Total		97	24	6	3	—		3	0	106	27
Medskogsbrons BK (loan)	2009	Division 3 Mellersta Norrland	3	2	0	0	—		—		3	2
Malmö FF	2013	Allsvenskan	28	5	4	0	6 (Note: Appearances in UEFA Europa League qualifying stages)	2	1 (Note: Appearance in Svenska Supercupen)	2	39	9
Malmö FF	2014	Allsvenskan	29	14	5	2	12 (Note: Appearances in UEFA Champions League)	2	1	1	47	19
Malmö FF	Total		57	19	9	2	18	4	2	3	86	28
RB Leipzig	2014–15	2. Bundesliga	14	0	1	0	—		—		15	0
RB Leipzig	2015–16	2. Bundesliga	32	8	1	0	—		—		33	8
RB Leipzig	2016–17	Bundesliga	30	8	1	0	—		—		31	8
RB Leipzig	2017–18	Bundesliga	21	2	1	1	11 (Note: Five appearances and two goals in UEFA Champions League, Six appearances in UEFA Europa League)	2	—		33	5
RB Leipzig	2018–19	Bundesliga	20	4	4	2	5	1	—		29	7
RB Leipzig	2019–20	Bundesliga	22	5	1	1	9	4	—		32	10
RB Leipzig	2020–21	Bundesliga	29	7	5	1	7	1	—		41	9
RB Leipzig	2021–22	Bundesliga	31	6	5	1	10 (Note: Six appearances and two goals in UEFA Champions League, four appearances and two goals in UEFA Europa League)	4	—		46	11
RB Leipzig	2022–23	Bundesliga	30	6	4	2	8	1	1 (Note: Appearance in DFL-Supercup)	0	43	9
RB Leipzig	2023–24	Bundesliga	14	2	1	1	6	1	1	0	22	4
RB Leipzig	Total		243	48	24	9	56	14	2	0	325	71
New York Red Bulls	2024	Major League Soccer	19	9	—		—		5 (Note: Appearances in MLS Cup playoffs)	1	24	10
New York Red Bulls	2025	Major League Soccer	33	11	3	1	—		3 (Note: Appearances in Leagues Cup)	1	39	13
New York Red Bulls	2026	Major League Soccer	31	4	2	1	—		—		33	5
New York Red Bulls	Total		83	24	5	2	—		8	2	96	28
Career total			483	117	44	16	74	18	15	5	616	156

=== International ===
Appearances and goals by national team and year
National team	Year	Apps	Goals
Sweden	2014	5	0
Sweden	2015	8	1
Sweden	2016	11	2
Sweden	2017	9	3
Sweden	2018	9	1
Sweden	2019	7	1
Sweden	2020	5	0
Sweden	2021	14	7
Sweden	2022	10	4
Sweden	2023	8	2
Sweden	2024	4	0
Sweden	2025	2	0
Total		92	21

Scores and results list Sweden's goal tally first

List of international goals scored by Emil Forsberg
No.	Date	Venue	Opponent	Score	Result	Competition	Ref.
1.	14 November 2015	Friends Arena, Solna, Sweden	Denmark	1–0	2–1	UEFA Euro 2016 qualifying	
2.	5 June 2016	Friends Arena, Solna, Sweden	Wales	1–0	3–0	Friendly	
3.	11 November 2016	Stade de France, Saint-Denis, France	France	1–0	1–2	2018 FIFA World Cup qualification	
4.	25 March 2017	Friends Arena, Solna, Sweden	Belarus	1–0	4–0	2018 FIFA World Cup qualification	
5.	25 March 2017	Friends Arena, Solna, Sweden	Belarus	2–0	4–0	2018 FIFA World Cup qualification	
6.	3 September 2017	Borisov Arena, Barysaw, Belarus	Belarus	1–0	4–0	2018 FIFA World Cup qualification	
7.	3 July 2018	Krestovsky Stadium, Saint Petersburg, Russia	Switzerland	1–0	1–0	2018 FIFA World Cup	
8.	8 September 2019	Friends Arena, Solna, Sweden	Norway	1–1	1–1	UEFA Euro 2020 qualifying	
9.	5 June 2021	Friends Arena, Solna, Sweden	Armenia	1–0	3–1	Friendly	
10.	18 June 2021	Krestovsky Stadium, Saint Petersburg, Russia	Slovakia	1–0	1–0	UEFA Euro 2020	
11.	23 June 2021	Krestovsky Stadium, Saint Petersburg, Russia	Poland	1–0	3–2	UEFA Euro 2020	
12.	23 June 2021	Krestovsky Stadium, Saint Petersburg, Russia	Poland	2–0	3–2	UEFA Euro 2020	
13.	29 June 2021	Hampden Park, Glasgow, Scotland	Ukraine	1–1	1–2 (a.e.t.)	UEFA Euro 2020	
14.	9 October 2021	Friends Arena, Solna, Sweden	Kosovo	1–0	3–0	2022 FIFA World Cup qualification	
15.	12 October 2021	Friends Arena, Solna, Sweden	Greece	1–0	2–0	2022 FIFA World Cup qualification	
16.	2 June 2022	Stožice Stadium, Ljubljana, Slovenia	Slovenia	1–0	2–0	2022–23 UEFA Nations League B	
17.	12 June 2022	Ullevaal Stadion, Oslo, Norway	Norway	1–2	2–3	2022–23 UEFA Nations League B	
18.	27 September 2022	Friends Arena, Solna, Sweden	Slovenia	1–1	1–1	2022–23 UEFA Nations League B	
19.	19 November 2022	Stadion, Malmö, Sweden	Algeria	1–0	2–0	Friendly	
20.	27 March 2023	Friends Arena, Solna, Sweden	Azerbaijan	1–0	5–0	UEFA Euro 2024 qualifying	
21.	19 November 2023	Friends Arena, Solna, Sweden	Estonia	2–0	2–0	UEFA Euro 2024 qualifying	

== Honours ==
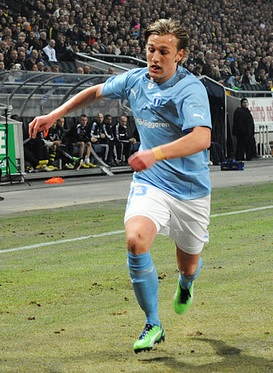
Forsberg playing for Malmö FF in 2013

Malmö FF

- Allsvenskan: 2013, 2014
- Svenska Supercupen: 2013, 2014

RB Leipzig

- DFB-Pokal: 2021–22, 2022–23
- DFL-Supercup: 2023

New York Red Bulls

- Eastern Conference (MLS): 2024

Individual

- Allsvenskan Midfielder of the Year: 2014
- Swedish Midfielder of the Year: 2016, 2017, 2019, 2021, 2022
- Bundesliga top assist provider: 2016–17
- Bundesliga Team of the Season: 2016–17
- Guldbollen: 2021
