= 2025 New York Red Bulls season =

New York Red Bulls
2025 season
- General Manager: Marc de Grandpré
- Head coach: Sandro Schwarz
- Stadium: Sports Illustrated Stadium
- Major League Soccer: Conference: 10th Overall: 18th
- MLS Cup playoffs: Did not qualify
- U.S. Open Cup: Quarterfinals
- Leagues Cup: League phase
- Top goalscorer: League: Eric Maxim Choupo-Moting (17); All: Eric Maxim Choupo-Moting (18)
- Highest home attendance: 25,219 (Sept. 27 vs New York City FC)
- Lowest home attendance: League: 11,135 (May 28 vs Charlotte FC); All: 3,749 (USOC) (May 21 vs FC Dallas)
- Average home league attendance: League: 19,710; All: 18,824
- Biggest win: RBNY 7–0 LAG (May 10)
- Biggest defeat: RBNY 1–5 MIA (July 19)
Home colors	Away colors

The 2025 New York Red Bulls season was the club's thirtieth season in Major League Soccer, the top division of soccer in the United States.

During the offseason, the club's stadium changed its name to Sports Illustrated Stadium after the company signed a deal to become the official ticketing partner of the club.

On September 30, 2025, the Red Bulls were eliminated from playoff contention after the Chicago Fire defeated Inter Miami to clinch the final spot in the playoffs in the Eastern Conference, marking the end of the longest record in making an appearance in the MLS Cup playoffs at fifteen seasons.

== Team information ==
=== Squad information ===
As of June 19, 2025

Appearances and goals are career totals from all-competitions.

No.	Player	Nationality	Date of Birth (Age)	Signed from	Apps	Goals	Assists
GK
31	Carlos Coronel (INT)	(Paraguay)	December 29, 1996 (age 29)	(Austria) Red Bull Salzburg	127	0	0
18	Ryan Meara	(United States)	November 15, 1990 (age 35)	(United States) Fordham University	63	0	0
21	Aidan Stokes (HG)	(United States)	January 14, 2008 (age 18)	Academy	0	0	0
40	AJ Marcucci	(United States)	August 31, 1999 (age 27)	(United States) New York Red Bulls II	0	0	0
DF
3	Noah Eile (U22) (INT)	(Sweden)	July 17, 2002 (age 24)	(Sweden) Malmö FF	15	0	0
4	Andrés Reyes (U22) (INT)	(Colombia)	August 9, 1999 (age 27)	(Colombia) Atlético Nacional	80	5	1
6	Kyle Duncan	(United States)	August 8, 1997 (age 29)	(Belgium) Oostende	131	5	15
12	Dylan Nealis	(United States)	July 30, 1998 (age 28)	(United States) Nashville SC	74	1	3
15	Sean Nealis	(United States)	January 13, 1997 (age 29)	(United States) Hofstra University	139	3	5
20	Juan José Mina (INT)	(Colombia)	July 27, 2004 (age 22)	(Colombia) Deportivo Cali	0	0	0
23	Aidan O'Connor	(United States)	October 7, 2001 (age 24)	(United States) Virginia	1	0	0
24	Curtis Ofori	(United States)	November 20, 2005 (age 20)	Academy	0	0	0
27	Davi Alexandre (HG)	(United States)	February 3, 2007 (age 19)	Academy	0	0	0
47	John Tolkin (HG)	(United States)	July 31, 2002 (age 24)	Academy	118	8	15
MF
5	Peter Stroud (HG)	(United States)	April 23, 2002 (age 24)	Academy	41	0	0
8	Frankie Amaya	(United States)	September 26, 2000 (age 25)	(United States) FC Cincinnati	102	8	11
9	Lewis Morgan (INT)	(Scotland)	September 30, 1996 (age 29)	(United States) Inter Miami	58	26	4
10	Emil Forsberg (INT)	(Sweden)	October 23, 1991 (age 34)	(Germany) RB Leipzig	14	6	3
17	Cameron Harper	(United States)	November 19, 2001 (age 24)	(Scotland) Celtic	79	6	6
19	Wikelman Carmona (INT)	(Venezuela)	February 24, 2003 (age 23)	(Venezuela) Academia Dynamo FC	64	4	2
22	Serge Ngoma (HG)	(United States)	July 9, 2005 (age 21)	Academy	12	2	0
48	Ronald Donkor (LO) (INT)	(Mali)	November 20, 2004 (age 21)	(Mali) Guidars FC	8	0	1
75	Daniel Edelman (HG)	(United States)	April 28, 2003 (age 23)	Academy	64	2	3
91	Bento Estrela (HG)	(Portugal)	February 10, 2006 (age 20)	Academy	0	0	0
FW
2	Dennis Gjengaar(INT)	(Norway)	February 24, 2004 (age 22)	(Norway) Odd	14	0	0
11	Elias Manoel (INT)	(Brazil)	November 30, 2001 (age 24)	(Brazil) Grêmio	62	11	6
13	Dante Vanzeir (DP) (INT)	(Belgium)	April 16, 1998 (age 28)	(Belgium) Union SG	40	7	6
33	Roald Mitchell (HG)	(United States)	January 13, 2003 (age 23)	(United States) New York Red Bulls II	2	0	0
41	Julian Hall (HG)	(United States)	March 24, 2008 (age 18)	(United States) New York Red Bulls II	5	1	0

- (HG) = Homegrown Player
- (GA) = Generation Adidas Player
- (DP) = Designated Player
- (INT) = Player using International Roster Slot
- (U22) = Player using U22 Initiative Slot
- (L) = On Loan to the club
- (LO) = Loaned out to another club
- (SEIL) = Season-ending Injury List

=== In ===
#	Pos.	Player	Signed from	Details	Date	Source
10	FW	(Cameroon) Eric Maxim Choupo-Moting	(Germany) Bayern Munich	Free transfer	February 2025	
5	DF	(Germany) Alexander Hack	(Saudi Arabia) Al Qadsiah FC	Free transfer	February 2025	
15	Midfielder	(Canada) Raheem Edwards	(United States) LA Galaxy	Free transfer	February 2025	
3	DF	(Chile) Marcelo Morales	Universidad de Chile	Transfer	February 2025	
17	FW	(Poland) Wiktor Bogacz	(Poland) Miedź Legnica	Transfer	February 2025	
22	Midfielder	(United States) Aiden Jarvis	Red Bulls Academy	Homegrown contract	February 2025	

=== Out ===
#	Pos.	Player	Signed by	Details	Date	Source
7	FW	(Jamaica) Cory Burke	(United States) Lexington SC	Contract end – Declined option	December 9, 2024	
47	DF	(United States) John Tolkin	(Germany) Holstein Kiel	Transfer – $3 million	January 16, 2025	
9	FW	(Belgium) Dante Vanzeir	(Belgium) KAA Gent	Transfer – Undisclosed fee	February 2025	
4	DF	(Colombia) Andrés Reyes	(United States) San Diego FC	Trade – $800K GAM + sell-on percentage	December 12, 2024	
11	FW	(Brazil) Elias Manoel	(United States) Real Salt Lake	Transfer – Undisclosed fee	February 2025	

=== Draft ===
There were no players drafted by the Red Bulls in the 2025 MLS SuperDraft.

== Preseason and friendlies ==
The Red Bulls announced their preseason schedule on January 18, 2025. They will train at IMG Academy in Bradenton, Florida, and play two friendlies before returning to their home training facilities. The team will then play in the Coachella Valley Invitational in Indio, California.

January 25 Exhibition	D.C. United	1–1	New York Red Bulls	Bradenton, Florida
10:00 AM	Stroud 76'	DC Report; RBNY Thread	Forsberg 21'	Stadium: IMG Academy

January 29 Exhibition	St. Louis City SC	1–0	New York Red Bulls	Bradenton, Florida
11:00 AM	Teuchert 27'	Report		Stadium: IMG Academy

February 3 Exhibition	New York Red Bulls	2–0	Hartford Athletic	Hanover, New Jersey
12:00 PM	Gjengaar; Sofo	Report		Stadium: New York Red Bulls Training Facility

February 8 Coachella Valley Invitational	San Jose Earthquakes	0–1	New York Red Bulls	Indio, California
1:00 PM PT	Harkes (yellow card) 54'; Munie (yellow card) 68'	Report	Hack 42'; Collahuazo (yellow card) 90'	Stadium: Empire Polo Club

February 12 Coachella Valley Invitational	New York Red Bulls	3–3	Real Salt Lake	Indio, California
12:30 PM PT	Hack 21'; Choupo-Moting 41' (pen.); Sofo 65'	Report	Ajago 9', 81'; Gonçalves 77'	Stadium: Empire Polo Club

February 17 Coachella Valley Invitational	San Diego FC	v	New York Red Bulls	Indio, California
10:00 AM PT				Stadium: Empire Polo Club

== Major League Soccer season ==
=== Eastern Conference ===
MLS Eastern Conference table (2025)
Pos	Team	Pld	W	L	T	GF	GA	GD	Pts	Qualification
1	Philadelphia Union	34	20	8	6	57	35	+22	66	Qualification for round one and the CONCACAF Champions Cup round one
2	FC Cincinnati	34	20	9	5	52	40	+12	65	Qualification for round one
3	Inter Miami CF (C)	34	19	7	8	81	55	+26	65	Qualification for round one
4	Charlotte FC	34	19	13	2	55	46	+9	59	Qualification for round one
5	New York City FC	34	17	12	5	50	44	+6	56	Qualification for round one
6	Nashville SC	34	16	12	6	58	45	+13	54	Qualification for round one
7	Columbus Crew	34	14	8	12	55	51	+4	54	Qualification for round one
8	Chicago Fire FC	34	15	11	8	68	60	+8	53	Qualification for the wild-card round
9	Orlando City SC	34	14	9	11	63	51	+12	53	Qualification for the wild-card round
10	New York Red Bulls	34	12	15	7	48	47	+1	43	
11	New England Revolution	34	9	16	9	44	51	−7	36	
12	Toronto FC	34	6	14	14	37	44	−7	32	
13	CF Montréal	34	6	18	10	34	60	−26	28	
14	Atlanta United FC	34	5	16	13	38	63	−25	28	
15	D.C. United	34	5	18	11	30	66	−36	26	

Source: MLS
Rules for classification: 1) points; 2) total wins; 3) total goal differential; 4) total goals scored; 5) fewer disciplinary points; 6) away goal differential; 7) away goals scored; 8) home goals differential; 9) home goals scored; 10) coin toss (2 clubs tied) or drawing of lots (≥3 clubs tied)
(C) Conference champion

=== Overall ===
Overall MLS standings table (2025)
Pos	Team	Pld	W	L	T	GF	GA	GD	Pts
16	FC Dallas	34	11	12	11	52	55	−3	44
17	Portland Timbers	34	11	12	11	41	48	−7	44
18	New York Red Bulls	34	12	15	7	48	47	+1	43
19	Real Salt Lake	34	12	17	5	38	49	−11	41
20	San Jose Earthquakes	34	11	15	8	60	63	−3	41

Source: MLS
Rules for classification: 1) points; 2) total wins; 3) total goal differential; 4) total goals scored; 5) fewer disciplinary points; 6) away goal differential; 7) away goals scored; 8) home goals differential; 9) home goals scored; 10) coin toss (2 clubs tied) or drawing of lots (≥3 clubs tied)

=== Results summary ===
Overall								Home						Away					
Pld	W	D	L	GF	GA	GD	Pts	W	D	L	GF	GA	GD	W	D	L	GF	GA	GD
34	12	7	15	48	47	+1	43	10	3	4	36	23	+13	2	4	11	12	24	−12

=== Matches ===
February 22 1	FC Cincinnati	1–0	New York Red Bulls	Cincinnati, Ohio
7:30 PM	Nwobodo (yellow card) 64'; Denkey 70'; Baird (yellow card) 88'	Report	Hack (yellow card) 59'	Stadium: TQL Stadium; Attendance: 22,747; Referee: Lukasz Szpala

March 1 2	New York Red Bulls	2–0	Nashville SC	Harrison, New Jersey
7:30 PM	Sofo 7'; Valencia (yellow card) 12'; Forsberg 30'; Choupo-Moting (yellow card) 57'; Eile (yellow card) 90+3'	Report	Yazbek (yellow card) 59'; Zimmerman (yellow card) 67'	Stadium: Sports Illustrated Stadium; Attendance: 18,843; Referee: Rosendo Mendoza

March 8 3	Atlanta United FC	0–0	New York Red Bulls	Atlanta, Georgia
7:30 PM	Latte Lath (yellow card) 8'; Edwards (yellow card) 40'	Report	Valencia (yellow card) 13'; Choupo-Moting (yellow card) 86'	Stadium: Mercedes-Benz Stadium; Attendance: 42,562; Referee: Tori Penso

March 15 4	New York Red Bulls	2–2	Orlando City SC	Harrison, New Jersey
2:30 PM	Choupo-Moting 29' (pen.); Gjengaar 47'; Stroud (yellow card) 68'; S. Nealis (yellow card) 74'; Ngoma (yellow card) 90+1'	Report	Ojeda 18'; Pašalić 39'; Jansson (yellow card) 82'	Stadium: Sports Illustrated Stadium; Attendance: 16,713; Referee: Armando Villarreal

March 22 5	New York Red Bulls	2–1	Toronto FC	Harrison, New Jersey
7:30 PM	Forsberg 44' (pen.), 76'; Ngoma (yellow card) 73'; Carballo (yellow card) 90+2' (yellow-red card) 90+3'	Report	Longstaff (yellow card) 24'; Petretta (yellow card) 45+4'; Bernardeschi (yellow card) 45+4'; Kerr 70'; Etienne Jr. (yellow card) 73'	Stadium: Sports Illustrated Stadium; Attendance: 18,185; Referee: Jon Freemon

March 29 6	New England Revolution	2–1	New York Red Bulls	Foxborough, Massachusetts
2:30 PM	Feingold (yellow card) 51'; Langoni (yellow card) 51'; Sands (yellow card) 75'; Gil 28', 90+7' (pen.)	Report	Choupo-Moting 45+2'; S. Nealis (yellow card) 49'; Eile (yellow card) 89'; Edwards (yellow card) 90+9'	Stadium: Gillette Stadium; Attendance: 20,439; Referee: Sergii Demianchuk

April 5 7	New York Red Bulls	2–1	Chicago Fire FC	Harrison, New Jersey
7:30 PM	Ngoma 41'; Choupo-Moting 45+2' (pen.)	Report	Bamba 32'	Stadium: Sports Illustrated Stadium; Attendance: 17,238; Referee: Jair Marrufo

April 12 8	Orlando City SC	0–0	New York Red Bulls	Orlando, Florida
4:30 PM	Pašalić (yellow card) 19'; Schlegel (yellow card) 31' (yellow-red card) 56'	Report	Ngoma (yellow card) 47'; Stroud (yellow card) 64'; Valencia (yellow card) 89'	Stadium: Inter&Co Stadium; Attendance: 21,418; Referee: Chris Penso

April 19 9	New York Red Bulls	1–2	D.C. United	Harrison, New Jersey
7:30 PM	Choupo-Moting 57'; Hack (yellow card) 88'	Report	Peglow 35', 44'; Herrera (yellow card) 70'; Barraza (yellow card) 81'; Badji (yellow card) 88'	Stadium: Sports Illustrated Stadium; Attendance: 18,407; Referee: Sergii Boiko

April 26 10	New York Red Bulls	1–0	CF Montréal	Harrison, New Jersey
4:30 PM	Eile (yellow card) 28', (goal) 67'; Valencia (yellow card) 85'; Ngoma (yellow card) 87'; Carballo (yellow card) 88'	Report	Saliba (yellow card) 55'	Stadium: Sports Illustrated Stadium; Attendance: 20,108; Referee: Tori Penso

May 3 11	Inter Miami CF	4–1	New York Red Bulls	Fort Lauderdale, Florida
7:30 PM	Picault 9'; Bright (yellow card) 14'; Weigandt 30'; Suárez 39'; Messi 67'	Report	Sofo 43'; Stroud (yellow card) 52'; S. Nealis (yellow card) 75'	Stadium: Chase Stadium; Attendance: 20,598; Referee: Ismir Pekmic

May 10 12	New York Red Bulls	7–0	LA Galaxy	Harrison, New Jersey
7:30 PM	Choupo-Moting 7', 31'; Forsberg 16', 50'; Harper 68'; Eile (yellow card) 74'; S. Nealis (yellow card) 74'; Gjengarr 88'; Yamane 90+3' (o.g.)	Report	Garcés (yellow card) 10'; Aude (yellow card) 49'; Cuevas (yellow card) 73'; Cerrillo (yellow card) 74'; Wynder (yellow card) 78'	Stadium: Sports Illustrated Stadium; Attendance: 23,225; Referee: Guido Gonzales Jr.

May 14 13	Nashville SC	2–1	New York Red Bulls	Nashville, Tennessee
8:30 PM	Yazbek 34'; Mukhtar 63'; Qasem (yellow card) 80'; Surridge (yellow card) 86'; Lovitz (yellow card) 90+5'	Report	Valencia (yellow card) 36'; Choupo-Moting 56'; Harper (yellow card) 73'; Edwards (yellow card) 83'	Stadium: Geodis Park; Attendance: 22,549; Referee: Marcos de Oliveira

May 17 14	New York City FC	2–0	New York Red Bulls	New York, New York
4:30 PM	Martínez 13'; Fernández (yellow card) 31'; Moralez 50'	Report	Eile (yellow card) 42'; S. Nealis (yellow card) 54'; Duncan (yellow card) 63'	Stadium: Citi Field; Attendance: 30,804; Referee: Allen Chapman

May 24 15	D.C. United	0–2	New York Red Bulls	Washington, D.C.
7:30 PM	Schnegg (yellow card) 37'; Pirani (yellow card) 77'	Report	Harper 42', (yellow card) 82'; Stroud (yellow card) 45'; Choupo-Moting (yellow card) 84'; Sofo (yellow card) 85', (goal) 90+5'	Stadium: Audi Field; Attendance: 19,290; Referee: Malik Badawi

May 28 16	New York Red Bulls	4–2	Charlotte FC	Harrison, New Jersey
7:30 PM	Bogacz 14'; Sofo 29'; Choupo-Moting 70' (pen.), 90+7' (pen.); Edelman (yellow card) 81'; Donkor (yellow card) 90+2'	Report	Vargas 26'; Biel (yellow card) 40'; Zaha (yellow card) 64'; Privett (yellow card) 68'; Abada 76'; Malanda (yellow card) 90+5'	Stadium: Sports Illustrated Stadium; Attendance: 11,135; Referee: Drew Fischer

May 31 17	New York Red Bulls	2–0	Atlanta United FC	Harrison, New Jersey
7:30 PM	Harper 3'; Duncan (yellow card) 26'; Choupo-Moting 29'; Edelman (yellow card) 45'; Hack (yellow card) 61'; Edwards (yellow card) 90+6'	Report	Edwards (yellow card) 34'; Slisz (yellow card) 78'	Stadium: Sports Illustrated Stadium; Attendance: 20,187; Referee: Marcos de Oliveira

June 14 18	Austin FC	2–1	New York Red Bulls	Austin, Texas
8:30 PM	Biro 6'; Desler (yellow card) 21'; Vázquez 51'; Pereira (yellow card) 84'	Report	Vázquez 23' (o.g.); Stroud (yellow card) 37'; Eile (yellow card) 81'; Hack (yellow card) 90'	Stadium: Q2 Stadium; Attendance: 20,737; Referee: Rosendo Mendoza

June 25 19	Toronto FC	1–1	New York Red Bulls	Toronto, Ontario
7:30 PM	Corbeanu 51'; Coello (yellow card) 66'	Report	Sofo 20', (yellow card) 80'	Stadium: BMO Field; Attendance: 19,826; Referee: Filip Dujic

June 28 20	New York Red Bulls	2–2	Minnesota United FC	Harrison, New Jersey
7:30 PM	Forsberg 11', (yellow card) 44'; Choupo-Moting 90'	Report	Yeboah 32'; Markanich 45'; Smir (yellow card) 67'; Romero (yellow card) 85'	Stadium: Sports Illustrated Stadium; Attendance: 21,293; Referee: Ricardo Montero

July 5 21	San Jose Earthquakes	1–1	New York Red Bulls	San Jose, California
10:30 PM	Jones (yellow card) 54' (yellow-red card) 64'; Sofo 58' (o.g.); Judd (yellow card) 80'	Report	Forsberg 19'; Edelman (yellow card) 60'; Edwards (red card) 87'; Donkor (yellow card) 90+2'	Stadium: PayPal Park; Attendance: 17,580; Referee: Malik Badawi

July 12 22	Philadelphia Union	2–0	New York Red Bulls	Chester, Pennsylvania
7:30 PM	Vassilev 9'; Damiani 24'; Harriel (yellow card) 62'; Lukić (yellow card) 62'	Report	Valencia (yellow card) 83'; Gjengarr (yellow card) 90+4'	Stadium: Subaru Park; Attendance: 18,745; Referee: Marcos de Oliveira

July 16 23	New York Red Bulls	5–3	New England Revolution	Harrison, New Jersey
7:30 PM	Carmona (yellow card) 54'; Edelman 56'; Choupo-Moting 70', 83'; Forsberg 72', 88' (pen.); Eile (yellow card) 76'	Report	Campana 5', 90+3', (yellow card) 45+4'; Duncan 30' (o.g.); Ceballos (yellow card) 61'; Hughes (yellow card) 87'; Díaz Espinoza (yellow card) 90+5'	Stadium: Sports Illustrated Stadium; Attendance: 15,863; Referee: Sergii Boiko

July 19 24	New York Red Bulls	1–5	Inter Miami CF	Harrison, New Jersey
7:30 PM	Hack 14'; Donkor (yellow card) 34'; Edwards (yellow card) 54'	Report	Segovia (yellow card) 11', (goal) 27', 45+3'; Alba 24'; Falcón (yellow card) 29'; Weigandt (yellow card) 45+6'; Messi 60', 75'	Stadium: Sports Illustrated Stadium; Attendance: 25,219; Referee: Victor Rivas

July 26 25	Chicago Fire FC	1–0	New York Red Bulls	Chicago, Illinois
8:30 PM	Cuypers 44' (pen.)	Report	Forsberg (yellow card) 89'	Stadium: Soldier Field; Attendance: 29,273; Referee: Allen Chapman

August 10 26	New York Red Bulls	2–1	Real Salt Lake	Harrison, New Jersey
6:00 PM	Hack (yellow card) 14'; Choupo-Moting 52', 90+9' (pen.); Donkor (yellow card) 59'; S. Nealis (yellow card) 77'; Duncan (red card) 90'	Report	Gozo 3', (yellow card) 77'; Luna (yellow card) 82' (yellow-red card) 85'	Stadium: Sports Illustrated Stadium; Attendance: 18,087; Referee: Ricardo Fierro

August 16 27	New York Red Bulls	1–0	Philadelphia Union	Harrison, New Jersey
7:30 PM	D. Nealis 74' (yellow card) 77'; Bogacz (yellow card) 90+6'	Report		Stadium: Sports Illustrated Stadium; Attendance: 21,425; Referee: Ismir Pekmic

August 24 28	Charlotte FC	1–0	New York Red Bulls	Charlotte, North Carolina
7:00 PM	Vargas 30'	Report	D. Nealis (yellow card) 22'; Edelman (yellow card) 37'; Duncan (yellow card) 52'; Forsberg (yellow card) 88'	Stadium: Bank of America Stadium; Attendance: 26,606; Referee: Armando Villarreal

August 30 29	New York Red Bulls	0–0	Columbus Crew	Harrison, New Jersey
7:30 PM	Sofo (yellow card) 69'	Report	Chambost (yellow card) 30'; Picard (yellow card) 79'	Stadium: Sports Illustrated Stadium; Attendance: 18,913; Referee: Rubiel Vazquez

September 13 30	Portland Timbers	2–1	New York Red Bulls	Portland, Oregon
10:30 PM	Rojas 28'; Velde (yellow card) 36'; Fory (yellow card) 61'; Antony 73'	Report	Stroud (yellow card) 38'; Choupo-Moting (yellow card) 45+1'; Forsberg 70'	Stadium: Providence Park; Attendance: 22,170; Referee: Joe Dickerson

September 20 31	CF Montréal	0–2	New York Red Bulls	Montreal, Quebec
7:30 PM		Report	Parker 23', (yellow card) 45+3'; Choupo-Moting 29'; Eile (yellow card) 45+3'; S. Nealis (yellow card) 62'	Stadium: Saputo Stadium; Attendance: 16,076; Referee: Filip Dujic

September 27 32	New York Red Bulls	2–3	New York City FC	Harrison, New Jersey
7:30 PM	Edwards (yellow card) 8'; Hall 23'; Forsberg 47'; Gjengarr (yellow card) 82'; S. Nealis (yellow card) 90+3'	Report	N. Fernández 2'; Perea 26'; Moralez (yellow card) 54'; Martins 65'; J. Fernández (yellow card) 90+12'	Stadium: Sports Illustrated Stadium; Attendance: 25,219; Referee: Guido Gonzales Jr.

October 4 33	New York Red Bulls	0–1	FC Cincinnati	Harrison, New Jersey
7:30 PM	Donkor (yellow card) 58'; Parker (yellow card) 90+2'; Hack (yellow card) 90+4'	Report	Denkey 12', (yellow card) 32'	Stadium: Sports Illustrated Stadium; Attendance: 25,017; Referee: Alexis Da Silva

October 18 34	Columbus Crew	3–1	New York Red Bulls	Columbus, Ohio
6:00 PM	Herrera 16'; Gazdag 66'; Aliyu 84'		Choupo-Moting 11'; Edelman (yellow card) 15'; Nealis (yellow card) 70'	Stadium: Lower.com Field; Referee: Marcos de Oliveira

== U.S. Open Cup ==
May 6 Round of 32	Colorado Springs Switchbacks FC	1–4	(New Jersey) New York Red Bulls	Colorado Springs, Colorado
9:30 p.m. EDT	Fontana 72'	Report	Sofo 16', 44'; Gjengaar 64', (yellow card) 87'; Hack (yellow card) 80'; S. Nealis 85', (yellow card) 87'; Edwards (yellow card) 90+3'	Stadium: Weidner Field; Referee: Christopher Calderon

May 21 Round of 16	New York Red Bulls (New Jersey)	2–2 (a.e.t.) (4–3 p)	(Texas) FC Dallas	Harrison, New Jersey
7:30 p.m. EDT	Sofo 63'; Forsberg 90+3'	Report	Kamungo 28'; Acosta 78'; Ramiro (red card) 113'	Stadium: Sports Illustrated Stadium; Attendance: 3,749; Referee: Alyssa Nichols
	Penalties
	Choupo-Moting (penalty scored); Eile (penalty scored); Carmona (penalty missed); Edelman (penalty scored); Forsberg (penalty scored)		(penalty missed) Acosta; (penalty scored) Moore; (penalty scored) Farrington; (penalty scored) Farfan; (penalty missed) Pedrinho

August 13 Quarterfinals	Philadelphia Union (Pennsylvania)	3–2	(New Jersey) New York Red Bulls	Chester, Pennsylvania
7:00 p.m. EDT	Baribo 13'; Iloski 74'; Lukić (yellow card) 75'; Makhanya 89'; C. Sullivan (yellow card) 90+6'	Report	Carmona 8', (yellow card) 59'; Duncan (yellow card) 23'; Edwards (yellow card) 25'; Choupo-Moting 71'; D. Nealis (yellow card) 88'	Stadium: Subaru Park; Referee: Joshua Encarnación
Note: Match postponed from July 9 due to severe weather.

== Leagues Cup ==
=== Group stage ===
July 31 1	Guadalajara (Mexico)	0−1	(United States) New York Red Bulls	Harrison, New Jersey
7:30 p.m. EDT	Sepúlveda (yellow card) 43'; Aguirre (yellow card) 90+6'	Report	Duncan (yellow card) 69'; Forsberg 90+7'	Stadium: Sports Illustrated Stadium; Attendance: 14,954; Referee: Lukasz Szpala

August 3 2	Monterrey (Mexico)	1–1 (5–3 p)	(United States) New York Red Bulls	Cincinnati, Ohio
8:30 p.m. EDT	Canales 38'; Guzmán (yellow card) 58'	Report	Hall 19'; Donkor (yellow card) 49'; Sofo (yellow card) 66'; Edelman (yellow card) 68'	Stadium: TQL Stadium; Attendance: 17,314; Referee: Guido Gonzales Jr.
	Penalties
	Canales (penalty scored); Fimbres (penalty scored); Corona (penalty scored); Ramos (penalty scored); Reyes (penalty scored)		(penalty scored) Eile; (penalty missed) Hack; (penalty scored) Bogacz; (penalty scored) Edelman

August 7 3	New York Red Bulls (United States)	1–1 (5–3 p)	(Mexico) Juárez	Harrison, New Jersey
7:30 p.m. EDT	D. Nealis 47'; Morales (yellow card) 84'	Report	Estupiñán 87'	Stadium: Sports Illustrated Stadium; Attendance: 10,083; Referee: Victor Caceres
	Penalties
	Choupo-Moting (penalty scored); Eile (penalty scored); Morales (penalty scored); Parker (penalty scored); Forsberg (penalty scored)		(penalty scored) Estupiñán; (penalty missed) Pizarro; (penalty scored) García; (penalty scored) Fulgencio

== Competitions summary ==
Competition	Record							
Competition	G	W	D	L	GF	GA	GD	Win %
MLS Regular Season	27	11	6	10	42	37	+5	40.74
U.S. Open Cup	3	1	1	1	8	6	+2	33.33
Leagues Cup	3	1	2	0	3	2	+1	33.33
Total	33	13	9	11	53	45	+8	39.39

== Player statistics ==
=== Top scorers ===
Place	Position	Number	Name	MLS	Playoffs	Open Cup	Leagues Cup	Total
1	FW	13	(Cameroon) Eric Maxim Choupo-Moting	11	0	0	0	11
2	MF	37	(Ghana) Mohammed Sofo	5	0	3	0	8
3	MF	10	(Sweden) Emil Forsberg	7	0	1	0	8
4	FW	22	(Norway) Dennis Gjengaar	2	0	1	0	3
5	MF	17	(United States) Cameron Harper	3	0	0	0	3
6	DF	3	(Sweden) Noah Eile	1	0	0	0	1
6	FW	7	(Poland) Wiktor Bogacz	1	0	0	0	1
6	DF	15	(United States) Sean Nealis	0	0	1	0	1
6	MF	81	(United States) Serge Ngoma	1	0	0	0	1
Own goals				2	0	0	0	2
Total				33	0	6	0	39

As of July 5, 2025
