= Cap-tied =

Term in association football

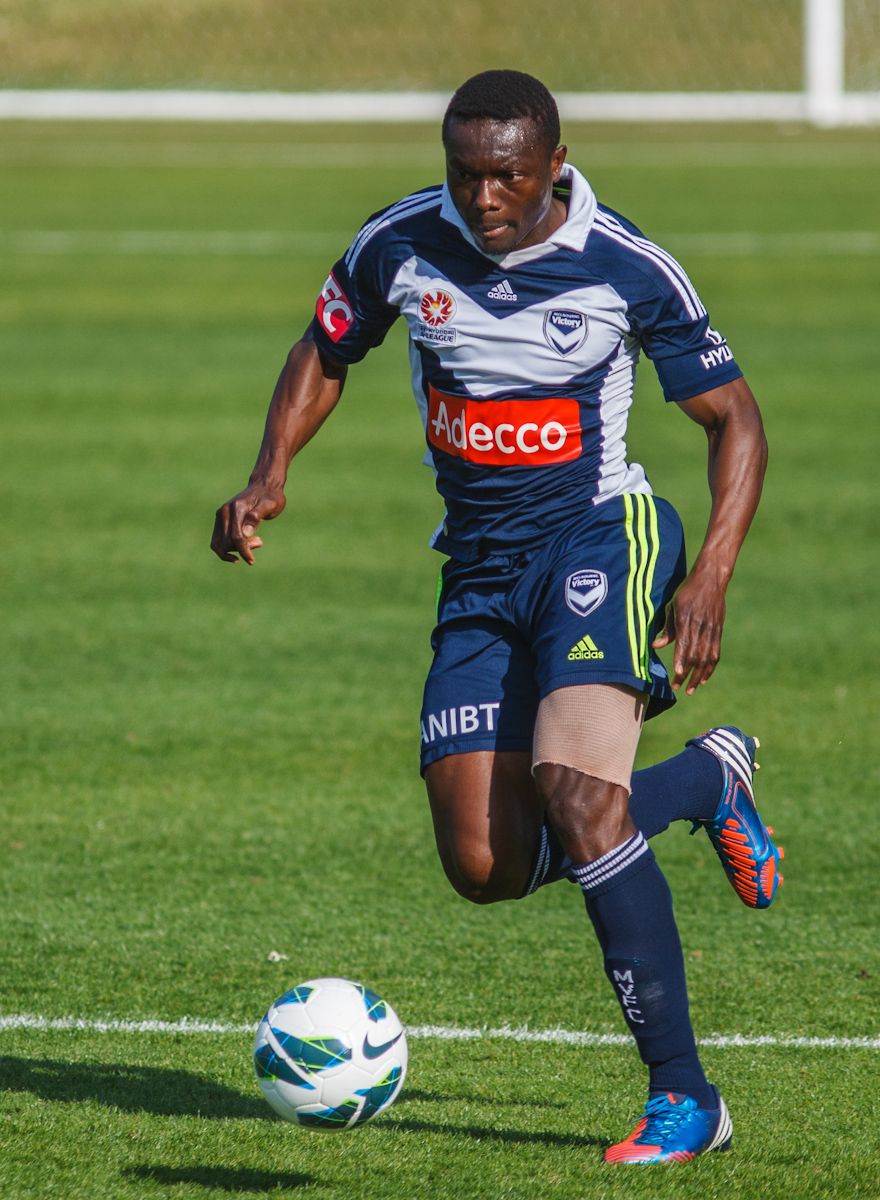
Adama Traoré was cap-tied from representing Australia as he had previously represented the Ivory Coast at youth level, prior to becoming an Australian citizen

Cap-tied is an adjective, used primarily in association football, to describe a player who has represented a senior national football team in more than three games (including at least one competitive game) and as a result is unable to represent another FIFA-affiliated national team. The term is a play on "cup-tied", which refers to a player who is not eligible to appear in a cup competition for a new team after having appeared for another team earlier in the season.

In general, a player is "cap-tied" once they have played in an official competition for the senior national team.

A player who was only eligible to play for one nation at the time of their first competitive appearance, no matter the level, is cap-tied to that nation. For example, Adama Traoré, an Ivorian youth international, had shown interest in playing for the Socceroos after having moved to Australia; however, in October 2013, the FFA released a statement saying that he was ineligible for Australia because of his prior appearances.

If a player was eligible to play for multiple nations prior to making a competitive appearance, they are cap-tied to a nation after playing more than three matches for one national team, including at least one competitive appearance (if the player is under 21 at the time, no matter the level of competition, as long as they have not played in the finals of a major tournament), or after making a competitive appearance (if the player is over 21 at the time and the appearance is for the senior team). Allowing young players to play a couple games before becoming cap-tied was a change to the rules announced during the 2020 FIFA congress, with the hope to prevent "one-cap wonders"; it was seen as an opportunity for some dual-national players, like Spanish-Moroccan Munir El Haddadi, who were called up as promising players for European nations, but not afforded more than one or two caps, to elevate the level of their African heritage nations.

Playing only in friendly competitions at any level does not cap-tie a player. A player who competes for one nation in a friendly match is not considered cap-tied and may represent another nation in a competitive fixture, should the opportunity present itself. An example of this is Jermaine Jones, who had played three friendlies for Germany in 2008 but started competing for the United States in 2010.

In some instances, players have sought refuge in another country after having represented their national team in an official competition. Players such as Maykel Galindo, Lester Moré, and Osvaldo Alonso represented Cuba and are unable to represent either Cuba or another nation.

Where countries merge or split, players whose nationality has changed are not cap tied. For example, Matthias Sammer played for East Germany before German reunification and for Germany thereafter, and James Moga played for Sudan before the secession of South Sudan and for South Sudan thereafter.

Before football was regulated, some players did represent multiple teams internationally. In the 21st century, Spanish players may represent their autonomous community (or Menorca) in friendly matches while playing for the Spain national team; the only way players can represent multiple nations at a senior competitive level is British players representing their national team (England, Scotland, Wales, or Northern Ireland of the United Kingdom, or the British Overseas Territories of Anguilla, Montserrat, or the Turks and Caicos Islands) and Great Britain at the Olympics.
