= 2024 Leagues Cup group stage =

2024 soccer tournament in North America

The 2024 Leagues Cup group stage consisted of a total of 45 teams competing across 15 groups to decide 30 of the 32 places in the knockout stage of the 2024 Leagues Cup.

== Format ==
In each of the 15 groups, teams played against each other in a round-robin format. The top two teams of each group advanced to the round of 32.

Besides the teams receiving byes, the top 15 remaining teams from each league were placed into groups in reverse order (for example, the 2nd-ranked MLS club was drawn against the 16th-ranked Liga MX club). The remaining teams (13 MLS and 2 Liga MX) were drawn into groups and divided into geographical regions.

Teams were ranked according to points (3 points for a win in regulation, 2 points for a win in a penalty shoot-out, 1 point for a loss in a penalty shoot-out, 0 points for a loss in regulation). If, at the end of the group stage, two or more clubs were tied in points, their positions in the table was determined according to a set of tie-breaking criteria.

=== Tiebreakers ===
1. In case only two teams were tied on points, the direct head-to-head match result between the tied clubs determined the ranking (for clarity, a victory on penalties was considered a win for purposes of this tiebreaker);
2. In case three teams were tied on points, the following criteria applied:
  1. Better overall goal differential between goals scored and goals conceded during the group stage;
  2. Greater number of goals scored during the group stage;
  3. Fewer number of goals conceded during the group stage;
  4. Clubs' fair-play table
    - First yellow card: –1 point
    - Second yellow card (indirect red card): –3 points (The first yellow card was not considered)
    - Direct red card: –3 points
    - Yellow card followed by a direct red card: –4 points;
  5. A draw organized by the organizing committee.

== Groups ==
The matches were played on July 26–28, July 30–August 1, and August 3–6, 2024.

Times are EDT, as listed by CONCACAF (local times, if different, are in parentheses).

=== East 1 ===
Pos	Team	Pld	W	PW	PL	L	GF	GA	GD	Pts	Qualification	CIN	NYC	QFC
1	(United States Soccer Federation) FC Cincinnati	2	2	0	0	0	5	2	+3	6	Advance to knockout stage	—	5–2	1–0
2	(United States Soccer Federation) New York City FC	2	0	1	0	1	2	4	−2	2	Advance to knockout stage	—	—	0–0
3	(Mexican Football Federation) Querétaro	2	0	0	1	1	0	1	−1	1		—	—	—

Source: Leagues Cup
Rules for classification: Tiebreakers
July 28, 2024
20:00

New York City FC (United States Soccer Federation)	0–0	(Mexican Football Federation) Querétaro
	Report
Penalties
Martínez (penalty scored); Thiago Martins (penalty scored); Moralez (penalty scored); Mijatović (penalty scored)	4–3	(penalty scored) Barrera; (penalty scored) Sosa; (penalty scored) Lértora; (penalty missed) Escamilla; (penalty missed) Cisneros

Yankee Stadium, New York City, New York
Attendance: 16,834
Referee: Keylor Herrera (Costa Rica)

August 1, 2024
20:00

FC Cincinnati (United States Soccer Federation)	1–0	(Mexican Football Federation) Querétaro
Asad 64'	Report

TQL Stadium, Cincinnati, Ohio
Attendance: 24,566
Referee: Randy Encarnación (Dominican Republic)

August 5, 2024
20:00

FC Cincinnati (United States Soccer Federation)	4–2	(United States Soccer Federation) New York City FC
Bucha 79'; Asad 82'; Kubo 86'; Sérgio Santos 89'	Report	Rodríguez 25'; Mijatović 61'

TQL Stadium, Cincinnati, Ohio
Attendance: 22,098
Referee: Ismael López (Mexico)

=== East 2 ===
Pos	Team	Pld	W	PW	PL	L	GF	GA	GD	Pts	Qualification	ORL	MTL	ASL
1	(United States Soccer Federation) Orlando City SC	2	1	1	0	0	5	2	+3	5	Advance to knockout stage	—	4–1	1–1
2	(Canadian Soccer Association) CF Montréal	2	1	0	0	1	4	6	−2	3	Advance to knockout stage	—	—	—
3	(Mexican Football Federation) Atlético San Luis	2	0	0	1	1	3	4	−1	1		—	2–3	—

Source: Leagues Cup
Rules for classification: Tiebreakers
July 26, 2024
20:00

Orlando City SC (United States Soccer Federation)	4–1	(Canadian Soccer Association) CF Montréal
Þórhallsson 7'; Torres 37'; Enrique 45+2'; Ojeda 57'	Report	Martínez 69'

Inter&Co Stadium, Orlando, Florida
Attendance: 16,033
Referee: Adonai Escobedo (Mexico)

July 30, 2024
19:00

Atlético San Luis (Mexican Football Federation)	2–3	(Canadian Soccer Association) CF Montréal
Boli 77' (pen.); Damm 90+13' (pen.)	Report	Pearce 17'; Cóccaro 27'; Ibrahim 82'

Saputo Stadium, Montreal, Quebec
Attendance: 17,314
Referee: Juan Gabriel Calderón (Costa Rica)

August 4, 2024
20:00

Orlando City SC (United States Soccer Federation)	1–1	(Mexican Football Federation) Atlético San Luis
Enrique 45+6'	Report	Dourado 71'
Penalties
Lodeiro (penalty scored); McGuire (penalty scored); Cartagena (penalty scored); Rafael Santos (penalty scored); Þórhallsson (penalty scored)	5–4	(penalty scored) Vitinho; (penalty scored) Salles-Lamonge; (penalty scored) Piccini; (penalty missed) Bonatini; (penalty scored) Boli

Inter&Co Stadium, Orlando, Florida
Attendance: 15,662
Referee: Mario Escobar (Guatemala)

=== East 3 ===
Pos	Team	Pld	W	PW	PL	L	GF	GA	GD	Pts	Qualification	UAN	MIA	PUE
1	(Mexican Football Federation) UANL	2	2	0	0	0	4	2	+2	6	Advance to knockout stage	—	1–1	2–1
2	(United States Soccer Federation) Inter Miami CF	2	1	0	0	1	3	2	+1	3	Advance to knockout stage	—	—	—
3	(Mexican Football Federation) Puebla	2	0	0	0	2	1	4	−3	0		—	0–2	—

Source: Leagues Cup
Rules for classification: Tiebreakers
July 27, 2024
20:00

Puebla (Mexican Football Federation)	0–2	(United States Soccer Federation) Inter Miami CF
	Report	Rojas 9'; Suárez 72'

Chase Stadium, Fort Lauderdale, Florida
Attendance: 16,490
Referee: Selvin Brown (Honduras)

July 31, 2024
21:30 (20:30 UTC−5)

UANL (Mexican Football Federation)	2–1	(Mexican Football Federation) Puebla
Córdova 2'; Reyes 85'	Report	De Buen 12'

Shell Energy Stadium, Houston, Texas
Referee: Armando Villarreal (United States)

August 3, 2024
20:00 (19:00 UTC−5)

UANL (Mexican Football Federation)	2–1	(United States Soccer Federation) Inter Miami CF
Brunetta 18'; Vigón 84'	Report	Campana 74' (pen.)

NRG Stadium, Houston, Texas
Attendance: 46,080
Referee: Ismael Cornejo (El Salvador)

=== East 4 ===
Pos	Team	Pld	W	PW	PL	L	GF	GA	GD	Pts	Qualification	PHI	CAZ	CLT
1	(United States Soccer Federation) Philadelphia Union	2	1	0	1	0	2	1	+1	4	Advance to knockout stage	—	1–1	1–0
2	(Mexican Football Federation) Cruz Azul	2	0	1	1	0	1	1	0	3	Advance to knockout stage	—	—	—
3	(United States Soccer Federation) Charlotte FC	2	0	1	0	1	0	1	−1	2		—	0–0	—

Source: Leagues Cup
Rules for classification: Tiebreakers
July 27, 2024
20:00

Philadelphia Union (United States Soccer Federation)	1–0	(United States Soccer Federation) Charlotte FC
Baribo 33'	Report

Subaru Park, Chester, Pennsylvania
Attendance: 18,514
Referee: Marco Ortíz (Mexico)

July 31, 2024
20:00

Charlotte FC (United States Soccer Federation)	0–0	(Mexican Football Federation) Cruz Azul
	Report
Penalties
Świderski (penalty scored); Westwood (penalty scored); Agyemang (penalty scored); Bronico (penalty scored)	4–2	(penalty scored) Antuna; (penalty missed) Rodríguez; (penalty scored) Rivero; (penalty missed) Romo

Bank of America Stadium, Charlotte, North Carolina
Attendance: 13,367
Referee: Bryan López (Guatemala)

August 4, 2024
20:00

Philadelphia Union (United States Soccer Federation)	1–1	(Mexican Football Federation) Cruz Azul
Gazdag 88'	Report	Rotondi 41'
Penalties
Gazdag (penalty missed); Elliott (penalty scored); Martínez (penalty scored); Adeniran (penalty scored)	3–5	(penalty scored) Piovi; (penalty scored) Montaño; (penalty scored) Ditta; (penalty scored) Rotondi; (penalty scored) Sepúlveda

Subaru Park, Chester, Pennsylvania
Attendance: 18,680
Referee: Jorge Camacho (Mexico)

=== East 5 ===
Pos	Team	Pld	W	PW	PL	L	GF	GA	GD	Pts	Qualification	NER	MAZ	NAS
1	(United States Soccer Federation) New England Revolution	2	1	1	0	0	2	1	+1	5	Advance to knockout stage	—	1–0	1–1
2	(Mexican Football Federation) Mazatlán	2	1	0	0	1	2	1	+1	3	Advance to knockout stage	—	—	—
3	(United States Soccer Federation) Nashville SC	2	0	0	1	1	1	3	−2	1		—	0–2	—

Source: Leagues Cup
Rules for classification: Tiebreakers
July 27, 2024
20:00

New England Revolution (United States Soccer Federation)	1–0	(Mexican Football Federation) Mazatlán
Panayotou 69'	Report

Gillette Stadium, Foxborough, Massachusetts
Attendance: 16,009
Referee: Oshane Nation (Jamaica)

July 31, 2024
21:00 (20:00 UTC−5)

Nashville SC (United States Soccer Federation)	0–2	(Mexican Football Federation) Mazatlán
	Report	Árciga 47', 54'

Geodis Park, Nashville, Tennessee
Attendance: 25,772
Referee: Lizzet García (Mexico)

August 6, 2024
19:30

New England Revolution (United States Soccer Federation)	1–1	(United States Soccer Federation) Nashville SC
Wood 3'	Report	Surridge 45+1'
Penalties
McNamara (penalty scored); Polster (penalty scored); Harkes (penalty scored); Arreaga (penalty scored); Boateng (penalty missed); Bye (penalty scored)	5–4	(penalty scored) Mukhtar; (penalty scored) Sejdić; (penalty scored) Godoy; (penalty scored) Pérez; (penalty missed) Muyl; (penalty missed) Lovitz

Gillette Stadium, Foxborough, Massachusetts
Attendance: 13,538
Referee: Alyssa Nichols (United States)

=== East 6 ===
Pos	Team	Pld	W	PW	PL	L	GF	GA	GD	Pts	Qualification	TOR	PAC	NYR
1	(Canadian Soccer Association) Toronto FC	2	1	1	0	0	2	1	+1	5	Advance to knockout stage	—	—	—
2	(Mexican Football Federation) Pachuca	2	0	1	0	1	2	3	−1	2	Advance to knockout stage	1–2	—	1–1
3	(United States Soccer Federation) New York Red Bulls	2	0	0	2	0	1	1	0	2		0–0	—	—

Source: Leagues Cup
Rules for classification: Tiebreakers
July 27, 2024
20:00

New York Red Bulls (United States Soccer Federation)	0–0	(Canadian Soccer Association) Toronto FC
	Report
Penalties
Morgan (penalty scored); Vanzeir (penalty scored); Carmona (penalty scored); Elias (penalty scored); Burke (penalty missed); Edelman (penalty missed); Reyes (penalty missed)	4–5	(penalty missed) Insigne; (penalty scored) Longstaff; (penalty scored) Thompson; (penalty scored) Etienne; (penalty scored) Osorio; (penalty missed) Marshall-Rutty; (penalty scored) O'Neill

Red Bull Arena, Harrison, New Jersey
Attendance: 10,958
Referee: Víctor Cáceres (Mexico)

July 30, 2024
20:00

Pachuca (Mexican Football Federation)	1–1	(United States Soccer Federation) New York Red Bulls
Rondón 56'	Report	Elias 47'
Penalties
Rondón (penalty scored); Cabral (penalty scored); González (penalty scored); Mena (penalty scored); Deossa (penalty missed); De los Ríos (penalty scored)	5–4	(penalty scored) Eile; (penalty scored) S. Nealis; (penalty scored) Carmona; (penalty scored) Elias; (penalty missed) Morgan; (penalty missed) D. Nealis

Red Bull Arena, Harrison, New Jersey
Attendance: 11,464
Referee: Jorge Camacho (Mexico)

August 4, 2024
20:00

Pachuca (Mexican Football Federation)	1–2	(Canadian Soccer Association) Toronto FC
Idrissi 59'	Report	Etienne 44'; Franklin 78'

BMO Field, Toronto, Ontario
Attendance: 24,202
Referee: Joe Dickerson (United States)

=== East 7 ===
Pos	Team	Pld	W	PW	PL	L	GF	GA	GD	Pts	Qualification	DCU	SAN	ATL
1	(United States Soccer Federation) D.C. United	2	1	1	0	0	6	3	+3	5	Advance to knockout stage	—	—	—
2	(Mexican Football Federation) Santos Laguna	2	0	1	0	1	0	3	−3	2	Advance to knockout stage	0–3	—	—
3	(United States Soccer Federation) Atlanta United FC	2	0	0	2	0	3	3	0	2		3–3	0–0	—

Source: Leagues Cup
Rules for classification: Tiebreakers
July 26, 2024
20:00

Atlanta United FC (United States Soccer Federation)	3–3	(United States Soccer Federation) D.C. United
Ríos 20', 81' (pen.); Lobjanidze 38'	Report	Benteke 4'; Stroud 25', 32'
Penalties
McCarty (penalty scored); Lennon (penalty missed); Firmino (penalty scored); Lobjanidze (penalty scored); Thiaré (penalty scored); Williams (penalty scored); Slisz (penalty missed)	5–6	(penalty missed) Klich; (penalty scored) Benteke; (penalty scored) Herrera; (penalty scored) Dájome; (penalty scored) Pedro Santos; (penalty scored) McVey; (penalty scored) Pirani

Mercedes-Benz Stadium, Atlanta, Georgia
Attendance: 14,428
Referee: Fernando Guerrero (Mexico)

July 31, 2024
20:00

Santos Laguna (Mexican Football Federation)	0–3	(United States Soccer Federation) D.C. United
	Report	Benteke 28'; Ku-DiPietro 48'; Dájome 58'

Subaru Park, Chester, Pennsylvania (Note: On July 26, 2024, D.C. United announced that their match against Santos Laguna would be moved to Subaru Park in Chester, Pennsylvania, due to extensive field damage at their home stadium, Audi Field.)
Attendance: 1,070
Referee: Natalie Simon (United States)

August 4, 2024
16:00

Atlanta United FC (United States Soccer Federation)	0–0	(Mexican Football Federation) Santos Laguna
	Report
Penalties
Lobjanidze (penalty scored); McCarty (penalty scored); Firmino (penalty scored); Thiaré (penalty missed)	3–5	(penalty scored) Muñóz; (penalty scored) Lozano; (penalty scored) Núñez; (penalty scored) Fagúndez; (penalty scored) Macías

Mercedes-Benz Stadium, Atlanta, Georgia
Attendance: 29,118
Referee: Iván Barton (El Salvador)

=== West 1 ===
Pos	Team	Pld	W	PW	PL	L	GF	GA	GD	Pts	Qualification	AUS	UNM	MTY
1	(United States Soccer Federation) Austin FC	2	2	0	0	0	5	2	+3	6	Advance to knockout stage	—	—	—
2	(Mexican Football Federation) UNAM	2	0	1	0	1	3	4	−1	2	Advance to knockout stage	2–3	—	—
3	(Mexican Football Federation) Monterrey	2	0	0	1	1	1	3	−2	1		0–2	1–1	—

Source: Leagues Cup
Rules for classification: Tiebreakers

July 26, 2024
21:00 (20:00 UTC−5)

UNAM (Mexican Football Federation)	2–3	(United States Soccer Federation) Austin FC
Ávila 45+5'; Martínez 72'	Report	Ring 8'; Zardes 45'; Driussi 55'

Q2 Stadium, Austin, Texas
Referee: Julio Luna (Guatemala)

July 30, 2024
21:00 (20:00 UTC−5)

Monterrey (Mexican Football Federation)	0–2	(United States Soccer Federation) Austin FC
	Report	Obrian 61'; Pereira 79'

Q2 Stadium, Austin, Texas
Referee: Daniel Quintero (Mexico)

August 3, 2024
22:00 (21:00 UTC−5)

Monterrey (Mexican Football Federation)	1–1	(Mexican Football Federation) UNAM
Corona 53'	Report	Funes Mori 80'
Penalties
Vázquez (penalty missed); Medina (penalty missed); Rojas (penalty missed)	0–3	(penalty missed) Quispe; (penalty scored) Huerta; (penalty scored) Nathan; (penalty scored) Ergas

Q2 Stadium, Austin, Texas
Referee: Walter López (Guatemala)

=== West 2 ===
Pos	Team	Pld	W	PW	PL	L	GF	GA	GD	Pts	Qualification	LAX	SJE	GUA
1	(United States Soccer Federation) LA Galaxy	2	1	1	0	0	4	3	+1	5	Advance to knockout stage	—	—	—
2	(United States Soccer Federation) San Jose Earthquakes	2	0	1	0	1	2	3	−1	2	Advance to knockout stage	1–2	—	—
3	(Mexican Football Federation) Guadalajara	2	0	0	2	0	3	3	0	2		2–2	1–1	—

Source: Leagues Cup
Rules for classification: Tiebreakers
July 27, 2024
22:00 (19:00 UTC−7)

Guadalajara (Mexican Football Federation)	1–1	(United States Soccer Federation) San Jose Earthquakes
Alvarado 90+8'	Report	Ebobisse 6'
Penalties
Alvarado (penalty missed); Mozo (penalty scored); Gutiérrez (penalty scored); Cowell (penalty missed); Beltrán (penalty scored)	3–4	(penalty scored) Skahan; (penalty missed) Marie; (penalty scored) Rodrigues; (penalty scored) Morales; (penalty scored) Vítor Costa

Levi's Stadium, Santa Clara, California
Attendance: 50,675
Referee: Mario Escobar (Guatemala)

July 31, 2024
22:30 (19:30 UTC−7)

San Jose Earthquakes (United States Soccer Federation)	1–2	(United States Soccer Federation) LA Galaxy
Ebobisse 75'	Report	Fagúndez 41'; Berry 89'

PayPal Park, San Jose, California
Attendance: 12,554
Referee: Lukasz Szpala (United States)

August 4, 2024
22:30 (19:30 UTC−7)

Guadalajara (Mexican Football Federation)	2–2	(United States Soccer Federation) LA Galaxy
Mozo 8'; Cowell 90+1'	Report	Paintsil 11'; Gabriel Pec 67'
Penalties
Cowell (penalty scored); Mozo (penalty scored); Alvarado (penalty scored); Govea (penalty missed); Gutiérrez (penalty scored); Sepúlveda (penalty missed)	4–5	(penalty scored) Gabriel Pec; (penalty missed) Fagúndez; (penalty scored) Delgado; (penalty scored) Paintsil; (penalty scored) Puig; (penalty scored) Yamane

Dignity Health Sports Park, Carson, California
Attendance: 25,174
Referee: Pierre-Luc Lauzière (Canada)

=== West 3 ===
Pos	Team	Pld	W	PW	PL	L	GF	GA	GD	Pts	Qualification	JUA	STL	DAL
1	(Mexican Football Federation) Juárez	2	1	1	0	0	3	1	+2	5	Advance to knockout stage	—	—	—
2	(United States Soccer Federation) St. Louis City SC	2	1	0	1	0	3	2	+1	4	Advance to knockout stage	1–1	—	2–1
3	(United States Soccer Federation) FC Dallas	2	0	0	0	2	1	4	−3	0		0–1	—	—

Source: Leagues Cup
Rules for classification: Tiebreakers
July 27, 2024
21:00 (20:00 UTC−5)

St. Louis City SC (United States Soccer Federation)	2–1	(United States Soccer Federation) FC Dallas
Teuchert 27'; Hartel 49' (pen.)	Report	Junqua 18'

CityPark, St. Louis, Missouri
Attendance: 17,584
Referee: Katja Koroleva (United States)

July 31, 2024
21:00 (20:00 UTC−5)

FC Dallas (United States Soccer Federation)	0–2	(Mexican Football Federation) Juárez
	Report	Zaldívar 23'; Hurtado 83' (pen.)

Toyota Stadium, Frisco, Texas
Attendance: 13,367
Referee: Melissa Borjas (Honduras)

August 4, 2024
21:00 (20:00 UTC−5)

St. Louis City SC (United States Soccer Federation)	1–1	(Mexican Football Federation) Juárez
Becher 58'	Report	Villalpando 62'
Penalties
Teuchert (penalty missed); Þórisson (penalty scored); Hartel (penalty missed)	1–4	(penalty scored) Hurtado; (penalty scored) Calvo; (penalty scored) Zaldívar; (penalty scored) Ortega

CityPark, St. Louis, Missouri
Attendance: 16,256
Referee: Jesús López (Mexico)

=== West 4 ===
Pos	Team	Pld	W	PW	PL	L	GF	GA	GD	Pts	Qualification	TOL	SKC	CHI
1	(Mexican Football Federation) Toluca	2	2	0	0	0	5	2	+3	6	Advance to knockout stage	—	2–1	3–1
2	(United States Soccer Federation) Sporting Kansas City	2	1	0	0	1	3	3	0	3	Advance to knockout stage	—	—	2–1
3	(United States Soccer Federation) Chicago Fire FC	2	0	0	0	2	2	5	−3	0		—	—	—

Source: Leagues Cup
Rules for classification: Tiebreakers
July 28, 2024
21:00 (20:00 UTC−5)

Sporting Kansas City (United States Soccer Federation)	2–1	(United States Soccer Federation) Chicago Fire FC
Castellanos 39'; Agada 76'	Report	Koutsias 22'

Children's Mercy Park, Kansas City, Kansas
Attendance: 14,047
Referee: Rubiel Vazquez (United States)

August 1, 2024
21:00 (20:00 UTC−5)

Toluca (Mexican Football Federation)	3–1	(United States Soccer Federation) Chicago Fire FC
Angulo 30'; Ruiz 45', 66'	Report	Koutsias 8'

SeatGeek Stadium, Bridgeview, Illinois
Attendance: 16,228
Referee: Josué Ugalde (Costa Rica)

August 5, 2024
21:00 (20:00 UTC−5)

Toluca (Mexican Football Federation)	2–1	(United States Soccer Federation) Sporting Kansas City
Angulo 40'; Araújo 66'	Report	Afrifa 45+1'

Children's Mercy Park, Kansas City, Kansas
Attendance: 14,797
Referee: Fernando Guerrero (Mexico)

=== West 5 ===
Pos	Team	Pld	W	PW	PL	L	GF	GA	GD	Pts	Qualification	POR	COL	LEO
1	(United States Soccer Federation) Portland Timbers	2	2	0	0	0	6	1	+5	6	Advance to knockout stage	—	3–0	—
2	(United States Soccer Federation) Colorado Rapids	2	0	1	0	1	1	5	−4	2	Advance to knockout stage	—	—	—
3	(Mexican Football Federation) León	2	0	0	1	1	2	3	−1	1		1–2	1–1	—

Source: Leagues Cup
Rules for classification: Tiebreakers
July 28, 2024
22:30 (19:30 UTC−7)

León (Mexican Football Federation)	1–2	(United States Soccer Federation) Portland Timbers
Medina 12'	Report	McGraw 41', 90'

Providence Park, Portland, Oregon
Attendance: 21,668
Referee: Walter López (Guatemala)

August 1, 2024
22:30 (19:30 UTC−7)

Portland Timbers (United States Soccer Federation)	4–0	(United States Soccer Federation) Colorado Rapids
Antony 30'; Ayala 52'; Toye 69'; Moreno 71'	Report

Providence Park, Portland, Oregon
Attendance: 12,453
Referee: Steffon Dewar (Jamaica)

August 5, 2024
21:00 (19:00 UTC−6)

León (Mexican Football Federation)	1–1	(United States Soccer Federation) Colorado Rapids
Guerra 77'	Report	Rafael Navarro 90+7'
Penalties
Cádiz (penalty scored); Barreiro (penalty scored); Guardado (penalty missed); Mendoza (penalty scored); Reyes (penalty missed)	3–4	(penalty scored) Mihailovic; (penalty scored) Bassett; (penalty scored) Rafael Navarro; (penalty scored) Bombito; (penalty missed) Maxsø

Dick's Sporting Goods Park, Commerce City, Colorado
Referee: Julio Luna (Guatemala)

=== West 6 ===
Pos	Team	Pld	W	PW	PL	L	GF	GA	GD	Pts	Qualification	NEC	SEA	MIN
1	(Mexican Football Federation) Necaxa	2	1	0	0	1	3	2	+1	3	Advance to knockout stage	—	—	—
2	(United States Soccer Federation) Seattle Sounders FC	2	1	0	0	1	3	3	0	3	Advance to knockout stage	1–3	—	2–0
3	(United States Soccer Federation) Minnesota United FC	2	1	0	0	1	1	2	−1	3		1–0	—	—

Source: Leagues Cup
Rules for classification: Tiebreakers
July 26, 2024
22:00 (19:00 UTC−7)

Seattle Sounders FC (United States Soccer Federation)	2–0	(United States Soccer Federation) Minnesota United FC
Morris 87'; Rothrock 90+4'	Report

Lumen Field, Seattle, Washington
Attendance: 28,526
Referee: Joe Dickerson (United States)

July 30, 2024
21:00 (20:00 UTC−5)

Minnesota United FC (United States Soccer Federation)	1–0	(Mexican Football Federation) Necaxa
Lod 10' (pen.)	Report

Allianz Field, Saint Paul, Minnesota
Attendance: 18,128
Referee: Sergio Reyna (Guatemala)

August 4, 2024
22:30 (19:30 UTC−7)

Seattle Sounders FC (United States Soccer Federation)	1–3	(Mexican Football Federation) Necaxa
Vargas 8'	Report	Palavecino 24'; Cambindo 44'; Rosero 90+2'

Lumen Field, Seattle, Washington
Attendance: 26,513
Referee: Oshane Nation (Jamaica)

=== West 7 ===
Pos	Team	Pld	W	PW	PL	L	GF	GA	GD	Pts	Qualification	VAN	LFC	TIJ
1	(Canadian Soccer Association) Vancouver Whitecaps FC	2	1	1	0	0	5	3	+2	5	Advance to knockout stage	—	—	3–1
2	(United States Soccer Federation) Los Angeles FC	2	1	0	1	0	5	2	+3	4	Advance to knockout stage	2–2	—	3–0
3	(Mexican Football Federation) Tijuana	2	0	0	0	2	1	6	−5	0		—	—	—

Source: Leagues Cup
Rules for classification: Tiebreakers
July 26, 2024
23:00 (20:00 UTC−7)

Los Angeles FC (United States Soccer Federation)	3–0	(Mexican Football Federation) Tijuana
Olivera 9', 51'; Bouanga 43'	Report

BMO Stadium, Los Angeles, California
Referee: Iván Barton (El Salvador)

July 30, 2024
22:30 (19:30 UTC−7)

Los Angeles FC (United States Soccer Federation)	2–2	(Canadian Soccer Association) Vancouver Whitecaps FC
Kamara 88'; Bogusz 90+5'	Report	Berhalter 5'; Veselinović 17'
Penalties
Atuesta (penalty scored); Kamara (penalty missed); Bogusz (penalty missed); Olivera (penalty scored)	2–4	(penalty scored) Kreilach; (penalty scored) Berhalter; (penalty scored) Raposo; (penalty scored) Laborda

BMO Stadium, Los Angeles, California
Attendance: 18,351
Referee: César Ramos (Mexico)

August 3, 2024
22:00 (19:00 UTC−7)

Vancouver Whitecaps FC (Canadian Soccer Association)	3–1	(Mexican Football Federation) Tijuana
Picault 49'; Johnson 77'; Vite 83'	Report	Castañeda 8'

BC Place, Vancouver, British Columbia
Attendance: 18,896
Referee: Marco Ortíz (Mexico)

=== West 8 ===
Pos	Team	Pld	W	PW	PL	L	GF	GA	GD	Pts	Qualification	HOU	ATL	RSL
1	(United States Soccer Federation) Houston Dynamo FC	2	1	0	0	1	3	1	+2	3	Advance to knockout stage	—	0–1	3–0
2	(Mexican Football Federation) Atlas	2	1	0	0	1	2	2	0	3	Advance to knockout stage	—	—	—
3	(United States Soccer Federation) Real Salt Lake	2	1	0	0	1	2	4	−2	3		—	2–1	—

Source: Leagues Cup
Rules for classification: Tiebreakers
July 27, 2024
20:00 (19:00 UTC−5)

Houston Dynamo FC (United States Soccer Federation)	0–1	(Mexican Football Federation) Atlas
	Report	R. Lozano 83'

Shell Energy Stadium, Houston, Texas
Attendance: 15,398
Referee: Ismael Cornejo (El Salvador)

August 1, 2024
21:00 (19:00 UTC−6)

Real Salt Lake (United States Soccer Federation)	2–1	(Mexican Football Federation) Atlas
Julio 45+2'; Palacio 79'	Report	Reyes 26'

America First Field, Sandy, Utah
Attendance: 20,956
Referee: Jon Freemon (United States)

August 5, 2024
21:00 (20:00 UTC−5)

Houston Dynamo FC (United States Soccer Federation)	3–0	(United States Soccer Federation) Real Salt Lake
Herrera 7'; Micael 24'; Glad 42' (o.g.)	Report

Shell Energy Stadium, Houston, Texas
Attendance: 11,062
Referee: Keylor Herrera (Costa Rica)
