= 2024 New York Red Bulls season =

New York Red Bulls
2024 season
- General Manager: Marc de Grandpré
- Head coach: Sandro Schwarz
- Stadium: Red Bull Arena
- Major League Soccer: Conference: 7th Overall: 16th
- MLS Cup playoffs: Runners-up
- Leagues Cup: Group stage
- Top goalscorer: League: Lewis Morgan (13); All: Lewis Morgan (13)
- Highest home attendance: 25,291 (Sept. 28 vs NYC
- Lowest home attendance: 15,128 (July 17) vs CFM
- Average home league attendance: League: 20,146; All: 20,189
- Biggest win: RBNY 4–0 MIA (Mar. 23)
- Biggest defeat: MIA 6–2 RBNY (May 4); RBNY 1–5 NYC (Sept. 28)
Home colors	Away colors

The 2024 New York Red Bulls season was the club's twenty-ninth season in Major League Soccer, the top division of soccer in the United States. The club made the MLS Cup final for the first time since 2008 as well as the club's first Eastern Conference Championship title.

== Team information ==
=== Squad information ===
As of June 19, 2024

Appearances and goals are career totals from all-competitions.

No.	Player	Nationality	Date of birth (age)	Signed from	Apps	Goals	Assists
GK
31	Carlos Coronel (INT)	(Paraguay)	December 29, 1996 (age 29)	(Austria) Red Bull Salzburg	127	0	0
18	Ryan Meara	(United States)	November 15, 1990 (age 35)	(United States) Fordham University	63	0	0
21	Aidan Stokes (HG)	(United States)	January 14, 2008 (age 18)	Academy	0	0	0
40	AJ Marcucci	(United States)	August 31, 1999 (age 27)	(United States) New York Red Bulls II	0	0	0
DF
3	Noah Eile (U22) (INT)	(Sweden)	July 17, 2002 (age 24)	(Sweden) Malmö FF	15	0	0
4	Andrés Reyes (U22) (INT)	(Colombia)	August 9, 1999 (age 27)	(Colombia) Atlético Nacional	80	5	1
6	Kyle Duncan	(United States)	August 8, 1997 (age 29)	(Belgium) Oostende	131	5	15
12	Dylan Nealis	(United States)	July 30, 1998 (age 28)	(United States) Nashville SC	74	1	3
15	Sean Nealis	(United States)	January 13, 1997 (age 29)	(United States) Hofstra University	139	3	5
20	Juan José Mina (INT)	(Colombia)	July 27, 2004 (age 22)	(Colombia) Deportivo Cali	0	0	0
23	Aidan O'Connor	(United States)	October 7, 2001 (age 24)	(United States) Virginia	1	0	0
24	Curtis Ofori	(United States)	November 20, 2005 (age 20)	Academy	0	0	0
27	Davi Alexandre (HG)	(United States)	February 3, 2007 (age 19)	Academy	0	0	0
47	John Tolkin (HG)	(United States)	July 31, 2002 (age 24)	Academy	118	8	15
MF
5	Peter Stroud (HG)	(United States)	April 23, 2002 (age 24)	Academy	41	0	0
8	Frankie Amaya	(United States)	September 26, 2000 (age 25)	(United States) FC Cincinnati	102	8	11
9	Lewis Morgan (INT)	(Scotland)	September 30, 1996 (age 29)	(United States) Inter Miami	58	26	4
10	Emil Forsberg (INT)	(Sweden)	October 23, 1991 (age 34)	(Germany) RB Leipzig	14	6	3
17	Cameron Harper	(United States)	November 19, 2001 (age 24)	(Scotland) Celtic	79	6	6
19	Wikelman Carmona (INT)	(Venezuela)	February 24, 2003 (age 23)	(Venezuela) Academia Dynamo FC	64	4	2
22	Serge Ngoma (HG)	(United States)	July 9, 2005 (age 21)	Academy	12	2	0
48	Ronald Donkor (LO) (INT)	(Mali)	November 20, 2004 (age 21)	(Mali) Guidars FC	8	0	1
75	Daniel Edelman (HG)	(United States)	April 28, 2003 (age 23)	Academy	64	2	3
91	Bento Estrela (HG)	(Portugal)	February 10, 2006 (age 20)	Academy	0	0	0
FW
2	Dennis Gjengaar(INT)	(Norway)	February 24, 2004 (age 22)	(Norway) Odd	14	0	0
7	Cory Burke	(Jamaica)	December 28, 1991 (age 34)	(United States) Philadelphia Union	33	2	0
11	Elias Manoel (INT)	(Brazil)	November 30, 2001 (age 24)	(Brazil) Grêmio	62	11	6
13	Dante Vanzeir (DP) (INT)	(Belgium)	April 16, 1998 (age 28)	(Belgium) Union SG	40	7	6
33	Roald Mitchell (HG)	(United States)	January 13, 2003 (age 23)	(United States) New York Red Bulls II	2	0	0
41	Julian Hall (HG)	(United States)	March 24, 2008 (age 18)	(United States) New York Red Bulls II	5	1	0

- (HG) = Homegrown Player
- (GA) = Generation Adidas Player
- (DP) = Designated Player
- (INT) = Player using International Roster Slot
- (U22) = Player using U22 Initiative Slot
- (L) = On Loan to the club
- (LO) = Loaned out to another club
- (SEIL) = Season-ending Injury List

== Roster transactions ==
=== In ===
#	Pos.	Player	Signed from	Details	Date	Source
10	MF	(Sweden) Emil Forsberg	(Germany) RB Leipzig	Undisclosed transfer	December 16, 2023	
3	DF	(Sweden) Noah Eile	(Sweden) Malmö FF	Undisclosed transfer	January 12, 2024	
33	FW	(United States) Roald Mitchell	(United States) New York Red Bulls II	Homegrown signing	January 14, 2024	
20	MF	(Uruguay) Felipe Carballo	(Brazil) Grêmio (loan)	One-year loan with option to purchase; Designated Player	August 16, 2024	

=== Out ===
#	Pos.	Player	Signed by	Details	Date	Source
3	DF	(United States) Matt Nocita	Free agent	Option declined	December 1, 2023	
2	DF	(United States) Jayden Reid	(United States) St. Louis City SC 2	Option declined	December 1, 2023	
98	DF	(Cameroon) Hassan Ndam	(Finland) FC Haka	Option declined	December 1, 2023	
65	MF	(Uganda) Steven Sserwadda	(United States) New York Red Bulls II	Option declined	December 1, 2023	
21	MF	(United States) Omir Fernandez	(United States) Colorado Rapids	Out of contract	December 1, 2023	
9	FW	(Colombia) Jorge Cabezas Hurtado	(England) Watford	End of loan	December 1, 2023	
16	MF	(England) Dru Yearwood	(United States) Nashville SC	$75,000 GAM	December 11, 2023	
74	FW	(United States) Tom Barlow	(United States) Chicago Fire FC	$300,000 GAM	December 18, 2023	
82	FW	(Brazil) Luquinhas	(Brazil) Fortaleza	Undisclosed	January 12, 2024	

=== Draft ===
Round	Selection	Player	Position	College/Club Team	Notes
1	#12	(United States) Aidan O'Connor	DF	Virginia	From Colorado Rapids
1	#14	Traded to Colorado Rapids			
2	#43	Traded to Colorado Rapids			

Notes

- Charlotte FC → Colorado Rapids → New York Red Bulls. Colorado Rapids acquired the natural first-round pick in the 2024 MLS SuperDraft, $50,000 in 2023 GAM, and $50,000 in condition GAM from Charlotte FC in exchange for their natural first-round pick in the 2023 MLS SuperDraft. Subsequently, the New York Red Bulls acquired the 12th overall pick in the 2024 MLS SuperDraft from Colorado Rapids for the 14th overall pick in the 2024 MLS SuperDraft and $50,000 in 2024 GAM.
- New York Red Bulls → Colorado Rapids → Charlotte FC. Colorado Rapids acquired the natural first and second-round draft pick in the 2024 MLS SuperDraft from New York Red Bulls for the 12th overall pick in the 2024 MLS SuperDraft and $50,000 in 2024 GAM. Subsequently, Charlotte FC acquired the 14th pick in the 2024 MLS SuperDraft from Colorado Rapids in exchange for $75,000 in 2024 GAM and $50,000 in 2025 GAM.
- New York Red Bulls → Colorado Rapids. Colorado Rapids acquired the natural first and second-round draft pick in the 2024 MLS SuperDraft from New York Red Bulls for the 12th overall pick in the 2024 MLS SuperDraft and $50,000 in 2024 GAM

== Preseason and friendlies ==
January 20 Exhibition	Florida Gulf Coast Eagles	0–6	New York Red Bulls	Bradenton, Florida
4:00 PM		Report	Hall (1st half); Vanzeir (1st half); Sofo (2nd half); Manoel (2nd half)	Stadium: IMG Academy

January 24 Exhibition	New England Revolution	0–3	New York Red Bulls	Bradenton, Florida
1:00 PM		Report	Forsberg 9' (pen.); Manoel 45' (Hall); Sofo 65'	Stadium: IMG Academy

January 27 Exhibition	Chicago Fire	2–2	New York Red Bulls	Bradenton, Florida
10:30 AM	Gutiérrez 41'; Barlow 71'		Forsberg 38'; Manoel 79' (Amaya)	Stadium: IMG Academy

February 3 Exhibition	New York Red Bulls	1–0	Hartford Athletic	Hanover, New Jersey
12:00 PM	Mitchell (2nd half)	Report		Stadium: New York Red Bulls Training Facility

February 10 Coachella Valley Invitational	St. Louis City SC	2–2	New York Red Bulls	Indio, California
5:00 PM	Blom 16'; Þeyr Þórisson 75' (pen.)	Report	Vanzeir 49' (Forsberg); Carmona 90' (pen.)	Stadium: Empire Polo Club

February 14 Coachella Valley Invitational	Austin FC	3–3	New York Red Bulls	Indio, California
4:00 PM				Stadium: Empire Polo Club

February 17 Coachella Valley Invitational	LA Galaxy	2–0	New York Red Bulls	Indio, California
1:00 PM	Puig 45' (pen.); Aude 86'	Report		Stadium: Empire Polo Club

== Major League Soccer season ==
=== Eastern Conference ===
MLS Eastern Conference table (2024)
Pos	Team	Pld	W	L	T	GF	GA	GD	Pts	Qualification
1	Inter Miami CF	34	22	4	8	79	49	+30	74	Qualification for round one, the 2025 Leagues Cup and the CONCACAF Champions Cup round one
2	Columbus Crew	34	19	6	9	72	40	+32	66	Qualification for round one and the 2025 Leagues Cup
3	FC Cincinnati	34	18	11	5	58	48	+10	59	Qualification for round one and the 2025 Leagues Cup
4	Orlando City SC	34	15	12	7	59	50	+9	52	Qualification for round one and the 2025 Leagues Cup
5	Charlotte FC	34	14	11	9	46	37	+9	51	Qualification for round one and the 2025 Leagues Cup
6	New York City FC	34	14	12	8	54	49	+5	50	Qualification for round one and the 2025 Leagues Cup
7	New York Red Bulls	34	11	9	14	55	50	+5	47	Qualification for round one and the 2025 Leagues Cup
8	CF Montréal	34	11	13	10	48	64	−16	43	Qualification for the wild-card round and the 2025 Leagues Cup
9	Atlanta United FC	34	10	14	10	46	49	−3	40	Qualification for the wild-card round and the 2025 Leagues Cup
10	D.C. United	34	10	14	10	52	70	−18	40	
11	Toronto FC	34	11	19	4	40	61	−21	37	
12	Philadelphia Union	34	9	15	10	62	55	+7	37	
13	Nashville SC	34	9	16	9	38	54	−16	36	
14	New England Revolution	34	9	21	4	37	74	−37	31	

Source: MLS
Rules for classification: 1) points; 2) total wins; 3) total goal differential; 4) total goals scored; 5) fewer disciplinary points; 6) away goal differential; 7) away goals scored; 8) home goals differential; 9) home goals scored; 10) coin toss (2 clubs tied) or drawing of lots (≥3 clubs tied)

=== Overall ===
Overall MLS standings table
Pos	Team	Pld	W	L	T	GF	GA	GD	Pts	Qualification
14	Vancouver Whitecaps FC (V)	34	13	13	8	52	49	+3	47	Qualification for the CONCACAF Champions Cup Round One (Note: As winners of Canadian Championship)
15	Portland Timbers	34	12	11	11	65	56	+9	47	Qualification for the U.S. Open Cup Round of 32 (Note: As one of the best U.S. teams in the overall table to not qualify for the 2025 CONCACAF Champions Cup)
16	New York Red Bulls	34	11	9	14	55	50	+5	47	Qualification for the U.S. Open Cup Round of 32
17	CF Montréal	34	11	13	10	48	64	−16	43	
18	Austin FC	34	11	14	9	39	48	−9	42	Qualification for the U.S. Open Cup Round of 32 (Note: As one of the U.S. teams who did not qualify for the 2025 CONCACAF Champions Cup or the 2025 Leagues Cup)

Source: MLS
Rules for classification: 1) points; 2) total wins; 3) total goal differential; 4) total goals scored; 5) fewer disciplinary points; 6) away goal differential; 7) away goals scored; 8) home goals differential; 9) home goals scored; 10) coin toss (2 clubs tied) or drawing of lots (≥3 clubs tied)
(V) Canadian Championship winners

=== Results summary ===
Overall								Home						Away					
Pld	W	D	L	GF	GA	GD	Pts	W	D	L	GF	GA	GD	W	D	L	GF	GA	GD
34	11	14	9	55	50	+5	47	7	7	3	31	23	+8	4	7	6	24	27	−3

=== Matches ===
February 25 1	Nashville SC	0–0	New York Red Bulls	Nashville, Tennessee
5:00 PM	Davis (yellow card) 26'; Anunga (yellow card) 73'; Godoy (yellow card) 90+4'	Report		Stadium: Geodis Park; Attendance: 30,109; Referee: Cristian Campo Hernandez

March 2 2	Houston Dynamo FC	1–2	New York Red Bulls	Houston, Texas
8:30 PM	Aliyu 7', (yellow card) 74'; Clark (yellow card) 36'; Dorsey (yellow card) 65'; Escobar (yellow card) 90+5'	Report	Manoel 43'; Morgan 59'; Amaya (yellow card) 64'; Harper (yellow card) 90+5'	Stadium: Shell Energy Stadium; Attendance: 16,516; Referee: Lorenzo Hernandez

March 9 3	New York Red Bulls	2–1	FC Dallas	Harrison, New Jersey
7:30 PM	Forsberg 30' (pen.); Morgan 54'; Duncan (yellow card) 58'	Report	Fraser (yellow card) 15'; Lletget (yellow card) 34'; Ferreira 59'	Stadium: Red Bull Arena; Attendance: 19,284; Referee: Amin Hadzic

March 16 4	Columbus Crew	3–0	New York Red Bulls	Columbus, Ohio
7:30 PM	Hernández 13', (yellow card) 45'; Russell-Rowe 56'; Morris 66'; Nagbe (yellow card) 83'	Report	Edelman (yellow card) 28' (yellow-red card) 90+6'; Burke (yellow card) 68'; Duncan (yellow card) 74'	Stadium: Lower.com Field; Attendance: 20,314; Referee: Andrew Musashe

March 23 5	New York Red Bulls	4–0	Inter Miami CF	Harrison, New Jersey
2:00 PM	Morgan 3', 51', 70'; Carmona 66'	Report	Kryvtsov (yellow card) 11'; Suárez (yellow card) 25'; Allen (yellow card) 84'	Stadium: Red Bull Arena; Attendance: 25,000; Referee: Rafael Santos

March 30 6	Orlando City SC	1–1	New York Red Bulls	Orlando, Florida
7:30 PM	Angulo (yellow card) 75'; Eile 89' (o.g.)	Report	Morgan 21'; Stroud (yellow card) 44'; Reyes (yellow card) 45+5'; Duncan (yellow card) 73'	Stadium: Inter&Co Stadium; Attendance: 23,859; Referee: Victor Rivas

April 6 7	FC Cincinnati	1–2	New York Red Bulls	Cincinnati, Ohio
7:30 PM	Kubo 3'; Nwobodo (yellow card) 32'; Miazga (yellow card) 45+5'; Orellano (yellow card) 74'	Report	Amaya 19', (yellow card) 70'; Vanzeir 60'; Ngoma (yellow card) 90+5'	Stadium: TQL Stadium; Attendance: 25,513; Referee: Drew Fischer

April 13 8	New York Red Bulls	0–0	Chicago Fire FC	Harrison, New Jersey
7:30 PM	Reyes (red card) 42'	Report	Acosta (yellow card) 55'; Czichos (yellow card) 75'	Stadium: Red Bull Arena; Attendance: 17,501; Referee: Sergii Boiko

April 20 9	Los Angeles FC	2–2	New York Red Bulls	Los Angeles, California
10:30 PM	Bouanga 67', 90+5'	Report	Segura 8' (o.g.); Elie (yellow card) 28'; Forsberg 81'; Amaya (yellow card) 85'	Stadium: BMO Stadium; Attendance: 22,122; Referee: Guido Gonzales, Jr.

April 27 10	New York Red Bulls	1–1	Vancouver Whitecaps FC	Harrison, New Jersey
7:30 PM	Vanzeir (yellow card) 34'; Carmona (yellow card) 43'; Morgan 56'; Edelman (yellow card) 58'; Eile (red card) 74'; D. Nealis (yellow card) 90+1'	Report	White 15'; Adekugbe (yellow card) 22'; Raposo (yellow card) 45+3'; Laborda (yellow card) 71'	Stadium: Red Bull Arena; Attendance: 17,525; Referee: Mark Allatin

May 4 11	Inter Miami CF	6–2	New York Red Bulls	Fort Lauderdale, Florida
7:30 PM	Rojas 48', 62'; Messi 50'; Avilés (yellow card) 57'; Suárez 69', 75', 81'	Report	Tolkin (yellow card) 25'; Vanzeir 30'; Duncan (yellow card) 38'; Carmona (yellow card) 39'; Forsberg 90+7' (pen.)	Stadium: Chase Stadium; Attendance: 21,488; Referee: Tori Penso

May 11 12	New York Red Bulls	4–2	New England Revolution	Harrison, New Jersey
7:30 PM	Morgan 6'; Forsberg 43'; Manoel 84'; Harper 90+3'	Report	C. Gil 24'; Kessler (yellow card) 42'; Borrero (yellow card) 66'; Chancalay (yellow card) 82'; Vrioni 90'	Stadium: Red Bull Arena; Attendance: 17,525; Referee: Jon Freemon

May 15 13	D.C. United	1–4	New York Red Bulls	Washington, D.C.
7:30 PM	Bartlett 65'	Report	Manoel 45+2'; Harper 52'; Morgan 57'; Burke 90+3'	Stadium: Audi Field; Attendance: 17,417; Referee: Rubiel Vazquez

May 18 14	New York City FC	2–1	New York Red Bulls	New York, New York
7:30 PM	Wolf 3'; Sands (yellow card) 32'; Bakrar 64'	Report	Harper (yellow card) 25', (goal) 45+1'; Amaya (yellow card) 65'; S. Nealis (yellow card) 67' (yellow card) 90+3' (yellow-red card) 90+3'; Tolkin (yellow card) 90'	Stadium: Citi Field; Attendance: 30,731; Referee: Armando Villarreal

May 29 15	New York Red Bulls	3–1	Charlotte FC	Harrison, New Jersey
7:30 PM	Manoel (yellow card) 45+2'; Forsberg 74', 76'; Reyes 83'	Report	Privett (yellow card) 45+2'; Vargas (yellow card) 73'; Agyemang (yellow card) 80'; Westwood (yellow card) 86'; Bender 90+6'	Stadium: Red Bull Arena; Attendance: 16,516; Referee: Chris Penso

June 1 16	New York Red Bulls	1–0	Orlando City SC	Harrison, New Jersey
7:30 PM	Tolkin 38'; Edelman (yellow card) 61'	Report	Angulo (yellow card) 86'	Stadium: Red Bull Arena; Attendance: 18,039; Referee: Drew Fischer

June 8 17	New England Revolution	1–0	New York Red Bulls	Foxborough, Massachusetts
7:30 PM	Polster (yellow card) 64'; Boateng 81'	Report	S. Nealis (yellow card) 44'	Stadium: Gillette Stadium; Attendance: 29,288; Referee: Alexis Da Silva

June 15 18	New York Red Bulls	0–0	Nashville SC	Harrison, New Jersey
7:30 PM	Eile (yellow card) 40'; Edelman (yellow card) 75'	Report	Bauer (yellow card) 32'	Stadium: Red Bull Arena; Attendance: 18,039; Referee: Guido Gonzales, Jr.

June 19 19	CF Montréal	2–2	New York Red Bulls	Montreal, Quebec
7:30 PM	Ibrahim 11'; Saliba (yellow card) 22'; Opoku 40'; Sosa (yellow card) 86'	Report	Harper (yellow card) 52'; Edelman (yellow card) 60'; Carmona 61'; Eile (yellow card) 76'; Hall 88'	Stadium: Saputo Stadium; Attendance: 19,619; Referee: Lukasz Szpala

June 22 20	New York Red Bulls	3–0	Toronto FC	Harrison, New Jersey
7:30 PM	Manoel 30'; Gjengaar 47'; Edelman (yellow card) 68'; Harper 75'; Eile (yellow card) 90+2'	Report	Longstaff (yellow card) 54'; Flores (yellow card) 87'	Stadium: Red Bull Arena; Attendance: 18,039; Referee: Joe Dickerson

June 29 21	New York Red Bulls	2–2	D.C. United	Harrison, New Jersey
7:30 PM	Manoel 24'; Donkor (yellow card) 28'; Burke (yellow card) 70'; Harper 78'	Report	Stroud 6'; Dájome (yellow card) 14' (yellow-red card) 20'; Santos (yellow card) 23', (goal) 45+4'; Rodríguez (yellow card) 52'; Herrera (yellow card) 83'; Miller (yellow card) 90+2'	Stadium: Red Bull Arena; Attendance: 18,315; Referee: Malik Badawi

July 6 22	Philadelphia Union	0–0	New York Red Bulls	Chester, Pennsylvania
7:30 PM	Bedoya (yellow card) 86'	Report	Edelman (yellow card) 45+2'	Stadium: Subaru Park; Referee: Filip Dujic

July 13 23	Colorado Rapids	1−1	New York Red Bulls	Commerce City, Colorado
9:30 PM	S. Nealis 64' (o.g.); Lewis (yellow card) 90+1'	Report	Morgan 45+1'; Edelman (yellow card) 70'; Eile (yellow card) 80'	Stadium: Dick's Sporting Goods Park; Attendance: 15,387; Referee: Timothy Ford

July 17 24	New York Red Bulls	2–2	CF Montréal	Harrison, New Jersey
7:30 PM	Carmona 18'; Choinière 75' (o.g.); S. Nealis (red card) 80'	Report	Piette (yellow card) 43'; Martínez 67', 81'	Stadium: Red Bull Arena; Attendance: 15,128; Referee: Sergii Boiko

July 20 25	New York Red Bulls	3–1	FC Cincinnati	Harrison, New Jersey
7:30 PM	Morgan 7', 59'; Duncan 52'; D. Nealis (yellow card) 80'	Report	Baird 67'; Yedlin (yellow card) 88'; Murphy (yellow card) 90'	Stadium: Red Bull Arena; Attendance: 19,828; Referee: Ted Unkel

August 24 26	Charlotte FC	1–1	New York Red Bulls	Charlotte, North Carolina
7:30 PM	Świderski 13' (pen.); Biel (yellow card) 69'; Urso (yellow card) 90+2'	Report	Manoel 37'	Stadium: Bank of America Stadium; Attendance: 31,320; Referee: Drew Fischer

August 31 27	New York Red Bulls	0–2	Philadelphia Union	Harrison, New Jersey
7:30 PM		Report	Uhre 4'; Baribo 14', (yellow card) 55'; Blake (yellow card) 76'	Stadium: Red Bull Arena; Attendance: 19,951; Referee: Jair Marrufo

September 7 28	New York Red Bulls	1–1	Sporting Kansas City	Harrison, New Jersey
7:30 PM	Donkor (yellow card) 22'; Carballo (yellow card) 66'; Hall 89'	Report	Pulido 55'; Davis (yellow card) 87' (yellow-red card) 90+2'	Stadium: Red Bull Arena; Attendance: 17,708; Referee: Ramy Touchan

September 14 29	Chicago Fire FC	2–1	New York Red Bulls	Chicago, Illinois
8:30 PM	Mueller (yellow card) 16'; Barlow 31'; Lassiter (yellow card) 57'; Koutsias 75'; Haile-Selassie (yellow card) 87'	Report	Gjengaar 47'; Vanzeir (yellow card) 90+7'	Stadium: Soldier Field; Attendance: 22,188; Referee: Mark Allatin

September 21 30	New York Red Bulls	2–2	Atlanta United FC	Harrison, New Jersey
7:30 PM	Vanzeir 31'; Carballo (yellow card) 45+2'; Coronel (yellow card) 72'; D. Nealis (yellow card) 87'; Manoel 90+7'	Report	Miranchuk 45+3' (pen.); Lobjanidze (yellow card) 68'; Mosquera 90+2'	Stadium: Red Bull Arena; Attendance: 19,751; Referee: Chris Penso

September 28 31	New York Red Bulls	1–5	New York City FC	Harrison, New Jersey
7:30 PM	Reyes (yellow card) 14'; Vanzeir 28'; Stroud (yellow card) 90+5'	Report	Moralez 5'; Martínez 7', 45+5'; Perea 30'; Gray 68'	Stadium: Red Bull Arena; Attendance: 25,291; Referee: Tori Penso

October 2 32	Toronto FC	1–4	New York Red Bulls	Toronto, Ontario
7:30 PM	Osorio (yellow card) 30'; Bernardeschi (yellow card) 43' (yellow-red card) 75'; Owusu 66' (pen.); Thompson (yellow card) 80'	Report	Meara (yellow card) 23'; Forsberg 27' (pen.); Reyes (yellow card) 38'; Tolkin 48'; Morgan 69' (pen.); Elias Manoel 88'	Stadium: BMO Field; Attendance: 21,575; Referee: Filip Dujic

October 5 33	Atlanta United FC	2–1	New York Red Bulls	Atlanta, Georgia
7:30 PM	Gregersen (yellow card) 70'; Miranchuk 75' (pen.); Wolff 90+7'	Report	Tolkin (yellow card) 32'; D. Nealis (red card) 66'; Forsberg (yellow card) 69'; Coronel (yellow card) 70'; S. Nealis (yellow card) 70'; Eile (yellow card) 90'; Ngoma 90+14'	Stadium: Mercedes-Benz Stadium; Attendance: 43,428; Referee: Ismir Pekmic

October 19 34	New York Red Bulls	2–3	Columbus Crew	Harrison, New Jersey
6:00 PM	Forsberg 78', 87' (pen.); Ngoma Jr. (yellow card) 90'	Report	Jackson 2'; Cheberko 14'; D. Jones (yellow card) 35'; Arfsten (yellow card) 45+2'; Amundsen (yellow card) 47', (goal) 90+7'	Stadium: Red Bull Arena; Attendance: 24,515; Referee: Guido Gonzales Jr.

=== MLS Cup playoffs ===
==== Round One ====
October 29 First leg	Columbus Crew	0–1	New York Red Bulls	Columbus, Ohio
6:45 PM	Arfsten (yellow card) 57'	Report	Carballo 25'; Forsberg (yellow card) 45+1'; Eile (yellow card) 90+4'	Stadium: Lower.com Field; Attendance: 19,050; Referee: Timothy Ford

November 3 Second leg	New York Red Bulls	2–2 (5–4 p)	Columbus Crew	Harrison, New Jersey
4:30 PM	Carballo (yellow card) 49'; Vanzeir 64'; Forsberg 80' (pen.); Nealis (yellow card) 90+5'	Report	Arfsten 55'; Hernández (yellow card) 90'; Ramirez 90+6'	Stadium: Red Bull Arena; Attendance: 20,936; Referee: Filip Dujic
	Penalties
	Tolkin (penalty missed); Eile (penalty scored); Carmona (penalty scored); Elias Manoel (penalty scored); Forsberg (penalty scored); Nealis (penalty missed); Edelman (penalty scored)		(penalty scored) Rossi; (penalty scored) Ramirez; (penalty scored) Hernández; (penalty scored) Russell-Rowe; (penalty missed) Cheberko; (penalty missed) Arfsten; (penalty missed) Mățan
Note: New York Red Bulls won the series 2–0.

==== Conference semifinals ====
November 23 Conference semifinals	New York City FC	0–2	New York Red Bulls	New York, New York
5:30 PM	Sands (yellow card) 33'; O'Toole (yellow card) 39'	Report	Carballo 16'; Vanzeir 25'; Edelman (yellow card) 28'	Stadium: Citi Field; Attendance: 24,891; Referee: Allen Chapman

==== Conference finals ====
November 30 Conference finals	Orlando City SC	0–1	New York Red Bulls	Orlando, Florida
7:30 PM	Schlegel (yellow card) 90+2'	Report	Reyes (yellow card) 24', (goal) 47'; S. Nealis (yellow card) 67'	Stadium: Inter&Co Stadium; Attendance: 25,046; Referee: Rosendo Mendoza

==== MLS Cup 2024 ====
December 7 Final	LA Galaxy	2–1	New York Red Bulls	Carson, California
4:00 PM	Paintsil 9'; Joveljić 13'; Delgado (yellow card) 38'	Report	S. Nealis 28'; Eile (yellow card) 35'; Harper (yellow card) 71'	Stadium: Dignity Health Sports Park; Attendance: 26,812; Referee: Guido Gonzales Jr.

== U.S. Open Cup ==
The New York Red Bulls were not sent to the tournament, but their MLS Next Pro team New York Red Bulls II was sent instead following the deal reached on March 1, 2024.

== Leagues Cup ==
=== East 6 ===
Pos	Team	Pld	W	PW	PL	L	GF	GA	GD	Pts	Qualification	TOR	PAC	NYR
1	(Canadian Soccer Association) Toronto FC	2	1	1	0	0	2	1	+1	5	Advance to knockout stage	—	—	—
2	(Mexican Football Federation) Pachuca	2	0	1	0	1	2	3	−1	2	Advance to knockout stage	1–2	—	1–1
3	(United States Soccer Federation) New York Red Bulls	2	0	0	2	0	1	1	0	2		0–0	—	—

Source: Leagues Cup
Rules for classification: Tiebreakers

July 27 Group Stage	New York Red Bulls (United States)	0–0 (4–5 p)	(Canada) Toronto FC	Harrison, New Jersey
8:00 PM		Report	Gomis (yellow card) 25'	Stadium: Red Bull Arena; Attendance: 10,958; Referee: Víctor Cáceres
	Penalties
	Morgan (penalty scored); Vanzeir (penalty scored); Carmona (penalty scored); Elias Manoel (penalty scored); Burke (penalty missed); Edelman (penalty missed); Reyes (penalty missed)		(penalty missed) Insigne; (penalty scored) Longstaff; (penalty scored) Thompson; (penalty scored) Etienne; (penalty scored) Osorio; (penalty missed) Marshall-Rutty; (penalty scored) O'Neill

July 30 Group Stage	Pachuca (Mexico)	1–1 (5–4 p)	(United States) New York Red Bulls	Harrison, New Jersey
8:00 PM	Rodríguez (yellow card) 40'; Rondón 56'; Deossa (yellow card) 89'	Report	D. Nealis (yellow card) 14'; Vanzeir (yellow card) 15'; Duncan (yellow card) 40'; Manoel 47', (yellow card) 70'	Stadium: Red Bull Arena; Attendance: 11,464; Referee: Jorge Camacho
	Penalties
	Rondón (penalty scored); Cabral (penalty scored); González (penalty scored); Mena (penalty scored); Deossa (penalty missed); de los Ríos (penalty scored)		(penalty scored) Eile; (penalty scored) S. Nealis; (penalty scored) Carmona; (penalty scored) Elias Manoel; (penalty missed) Morgan; (penalty missed) D. Nealis

== Competitions summary ==
Competition	Record							
Competition	G	W	D	L	GF	GA	GD	Win %
MLS Regular Season	16	8	5	3	29	22	+7	50.00
MLS Cup Playoffs	0	0	0	0	0	0	+0	—
U.S. Open Cup	0	0	0	0	0	0	+0	—
Leagues Cup	0	0	0	0	0	0	+0	—
Total	16	8	5	3	29	22	+7	50.00

== Player statistics ==
=== Appearances and goals ===
As of June 19, 2024

No.	Pos	Nat	Player	Total		MLS		Playoffs		Open Cup		Leagues Cup	
No.	Pos	Nat	Player	Apps	Goals	Apps	Goals	Apps	Goals	Apps	Goals	Apps	Goals
Goalkeepers
18	GK	(United States) USA	Ryan Meara	4	-3	4	-3	0	0	0	0	0	0
31	GK	(Paraguay) PAR	Carlos Coronel	15	-22	15	-22	0	0	0	0	0	0
40	GK	(United States) USA	AJ Marcucci	0	0	0	0	0	0	0	0	0	0
Defenders
3	DF	(Sweden) SWE	Noah Eile	16	0	14+2	0	0	0	0	0	0	0
4	DF	(Colombia) COL	Andrés Reyes	12	1	8+4	1	0	0	0	0	0	0
6	DF	(United States) USA	Kyle Duncan	14	0	9+5	0	0	0	0	0	0	0
12	DF	(United States) USA	Dylan Nealis	16	0	14+2	0	0	0	0	0	0	0
15	DF	(United States) USA	Sean Nealis	17	0	15+2	0	0	0	0	0	0	0
23	DF	(United States) USA	Aidan O'Connor	1	0	0+1	0	0	0	0	0	0	0
24	DF	(United States) USA	Curtis Ofori	0	0	0	0	0	0	0	0	0	0
47	DF	(United States) USA	John Tolkin	16	1	15+1	1	0	0	0	0	0	0
Midfielders
5	MF	(United States) USA	Peter Stroud	8	0	8	0	0	0	0	0	0	0
8	MF	(United States) USA	Frankie Amaya	19	1	17+2	1	0	0	0	0	0	0
9	MF	(Scotland) SCO	Lewis Morgan	16	9	14+2	9	0	0	0	0	0	0
10	MF	(Sweden) SWE	Emil Forsberg	14	6	13+1	6	0	0	0	0	0	0
17	MF	(United States) USA	Cameron Harper	13	3	5+8	3	0	0	0	0	0	0
19	MF	(Venezuela) VEN	Wikelman Carmona	17	2	13+4	2	0	0	0	0	0	0
22	MF	(United States) USA	Serge Ngoma	2	0	0+2	0	0	0	0	0	0	0
48	MF	(Ghana) GHA	Ronald Donkor	3	0	1+2	0	0	0	0	0	0	0
65	MF	(Uganda) UGA	Steven Sserwadda	0	0	0	0	0	0	0	0	0	0
75	MF	(United States) USA	Daniel Edelman	17	0	15+2	0	0	0	0	0	0	0
91	MF	(Portugal) POR	Bento Estrela	0	0	0	0	0	0	0	0	0	0
Forwards
2	FW	(Norway) NOR	Dennis Gjengaar	13	0	4+9	0	0	0	0	0	0	0
7	FW	(Jamaica) JAM	Cory Burke	9	1	0+9	1	0	0	0	0	0	0
11	FW	(Brazil) BRA	Elias Manoel	18	3	10+8	3	0	0	0	0	0	0
13	FW	(Belgium) BEL	Dante Vanzeir	17	2	15+2	2	0	0	0	0	0	0
16	FW	(United States) USA	Julian Hall	5	1	0+5	1	0	0	0	0	0	0
33	FW	(United States) USA	Roald Mitchell	2	0	0+2	0	0	0	0	0	0	0

=== Top scorers ===
Place	Position	Number	Name	MLS	Playoffs	Open Cup	Leagues Cup	Total
1	MF	9	(Scotland) Lewis Morgan	9	0	0	0	9
2	MF	10	(Sweden) Emil Forsberg	6	0	0	0	6
3	FW	11	(Brazil) Elias Manoel	4	0	0	0	4
3	MF	17	(United States) Cameron Harper	4	0	0	0	4
4	FW	13	(Belgium) Dante Vanzeir	2	0	0	0	2
4	MF	19	(Venezuela) Wikelman Carmona	2	0	0	0	2
5	FW	2	(Norway) Dennis Gjengaar	1	0	0	0	1
5	DF	4	(Colombia) Andrés Reyes	1	0	0	0	1
5	FW	7	(Jamaica) Cory Burke	1	0	0	0	1
5	MF	8	(United States) Frankie Amaya	1	0	0	0	1
5	FW	16	(United States) Julian Hall	1	0	0	0	1
5	DF	47	(United States) John Tolkin	1	0	0	0	1
Own goals				1	0	0	0	1
Total				34	0	0	0	34

As of June 22, 2024

=== Assist leaders ===
Place	Position	Number	Name	MLS	Playoffs	Open Cup	Leagues Cup	Total
1	FW	13	(Belgium) Dante Vanzeir	6	0	0	0	6
2	MF	9	(Scotland) Lewis Morgan	3	0	0	0	3
2	MF	10	(Sweden) Emil Forsberg	3	0	0	0	3
2	MF	19	(Venezuela) Wikelman Carmona	3	0	0	0	3
3	MF	8	(United States) Frankie Amaya	2	0	0	0	2
3	DF	12	(United States) Dylan Nealis	2	0	0	0	2
3	DF	15	(United States) Sean Nealis	2	0	0	0	2
4	DF	3	(Sweden) Noah Eile	1	0	0	0	1
4	FW	7	(Jamaica) Cory Burke	1	0	0	0	1
4	DF	47	(United States) John Tolkin	1	0	0	0	1
Total				24	0	0	0	24

As of June 22, 2024

=== Cleansheets ===
Place	Position	Number	Name	MLS	Playoffs	Open Cup	Leagues Cup	Total
1	GK	18	(United States) Ryan Meara	3	0	0	0	3
1	GK	31	(Paraguay) Carlos Coronel	3	0	0	0	3
Total				6	0	0	0	6

As of June 22, 2024
