= 2024 MLS Cup playoffs =

2024 edition of the MLS playoffs

Tournament details
- Country: United States; Canada
- Dates: October 22 – December 7
- Teams: 18

Final positions
- Champions: LA Galaxy (6th title)
- Runners-up: New York Red Bulls
- Semifinalists: Orlando City SC; Seattle Sounders FC

Tournament statistics
- Matches played: 29
- Goals scored: 74 (2.55 per match)
- Attendance: 697,543 (24,053 per match)
- Top goal scorer(s): (Serbia) Dejan Joveljić (6 goals)

The 2024 MLS Cup playoffs (branded as the Audi 2024 MLS Cup Playoffs for sponsorship reasons) was the postseason championship of Major League Soccer (MLS), the top soccer league in the United States and Canada. It was the 29th edition of the MLS Cup playoffs, the tournament culminating at the end of the 2024 season. The playoffs began on October 22 and concluded with MLS Cup 2024 on December 7.

The Columbus Crew entered the playoffs as the defending MLS Cup champions, but were eliminated by the New York Red Bulls in round one. Inter Miami CF entered as Supporters' Shield winners and Eastern Conference regular season leaders; they were eliminated in round one by Atlanta United FC. Western Conference regular season leaders Los Angeles FC were eliminated in the conference semifinals by Seattle Sounders FC.

The LA Galaxy won a record-extending sixth MLS Cup title after defeating the New York Red Bulls 2–1. The Galaxy also broke the record for the most goals by a team in an MLS playoff campaign, scoring 18 in total.

== Format ==
Similar to the 2023 edition, the playoffs featured a field of eighteen teams—the top nine teams from each conference. The top seven teams in each conference automatically qualified for round one, while the eighth and ninth-placed teams in each conference contested a single wild card match for the right to play the best-ranked team in their conference, with only a penalty shoot-out occurring if the game was tied. Round one comprised a best-of-three format, with higher seeds playing against lower seeds. The round did not have the aggregate score kept, and tied matches proceeded directly to a penalty shoot-out to determine the winner. The remaining three rounds — the conference semifinals, the conference final, and MLS Cup — were single-elimination matches played with extra time and a penalty shoot-out if still tied. The team with the better regular season record hosted the match in all rounds except for the best-of-three series in round one, where the team with the lower regular season record hosted the second of three possible matches. All matches were broadcast globally on MLS Season Pass, a streaming service operated by Apple.

== Qualified teams ==
The playoffs were contested by eighteen teams. The date listed indicates when each team qualified for the playoffs.

Eastern Conference

- Atlanta United FC (October 19)
- Charlotte FC (October 2)
- FC Cincinnati (September 14)
- Columbus Crew (September 14)
- Inter Miami CF (August 24)
- CF Montréal (October 19)
- New York City FC (September 28)
- New York Red Bulls (September 28)
- Orlando City SC (September 28)

Western Conference

- Colorado Rapids (September 21)
- Houston Dynamo FC (September 28)
- LA Galaxy (September 14)
- Los Angeles FC (September 28)
- Minnesota United (October 2)
- Portland Timbers (October 5)
- Real Salt Lake (September 21)
- Seattle Sounders FC (September 28)
- Vancouver Whitecaps FC (September 28)

== Conference standings ==
Eastern Conference

MLS Eastern Conference table (2024)
Pos	Team	Pld	Pts
1	Inter Miami CF	34	74
2	Columbus Crew	34	66
3	FC Cincinnati	34	59
4	Orlando City SC	34	52
5	Charlotte FC	34	51
6	New York City FC	34	50
7	New York Red Bulls	34	47
8	CF Montréal	34	43
9	Atlanta United FC	34	40

Source: MLS

Western Conference

MLS Western Conference table (2024)
Pos	Team	Pld	Pts
1	Los Angeles FC	34	64
2	LA Galaxy	34	64
3	Real Salt Lake	34	59
4	Seattle Sounders FC	34	57
5	Houston Dynamo FC	34	54
6	Minnesota United FC	34	52
7	Colorado Rapids	34	50
8	Vancouver Whitecaps FC	34	47
9	Portland Timbers	34	47

Source: MLS

== Bracket ==
The higher seeded teams hosted single-elimination matches, with the MLS Cup host determined by overall points in the Supporters' Shield table. During the best-of-three round, the team with higher seed hosted the first match and the third match if necessary.

Wild card single match
E8	CF Montréal	2 (4)
E9	Atlanta United FC	2 (5)
W8	Vancouver Whitecaps FC	5
W9	Portland Timbers	0

Round one best-of-three series
E1	Inter Miami CF	2	1	2
E9	Atlanta United FC	1	2	3
E4	Orlando City SC	2	0 (1)	1 (4)
E5	Charlotte FC	0	0 (3)	1 (1)
E3	FC Cincinnati	1	1	0 (5)
E6	New York City FC	0	3	0 (6)
E2	Columbus Crew	0	2 (4)	–
E7	New York Red Bulls	1	2 (5)	–
W1	Los Angeles FC	2	0	1
W8	Vancouver Whitecaps FC	1	3	0
W4	Seattle Sounders FC	0 (5)	1 (7)	–
W5	Houston Dynamo FC	0 (4)	1 (6)	–
W3	Real Salt Lake	0 (4)	1 (1)	–
W6	Minnesota United FC	0 (5)	1 (3)	–
W2	LA Galaxy	5	4	–
W7	Colorado Rapids	0	1	–

Conference semifinals single match
E9	Atlanta United FC	0
E4	Orlando City SC	1
Eastern Conference
E6	New York City FC	0
E7	New York Red Bulls	2
W1	Los Angeles FC	1
W4	Seattle Sounders FC (a.e.t.)	2
Western Conference
W6	Minnesota United FC	2
W2	LA Galaxy	6

Conference finals single match
E4	Orlando City SC	0
E7	New York Red Bulls	1
W4	Seattle Sounders FC	0
W2	LA Galaxy	1

MLS Cup single match
E7	New York Red Bulls	1
W2	LA Galaxy	2

== Wild card round ==
Home team	Score	Away team
Eastern Conference
CF Montréal	2–2 (4–5 p)	Atlanta United FC
Western Conference
Vancouver Whitecaps FC	5–0	Portland Timbers

=== Eastern Conference ===
October 22
7:30 pm EDT

CF Montréal	2–2	Atlanta United FC
Martínez 63', 89' (pen.)	Report	Lennon 29'; Gregersen 44'
Penalties
Martínez (penalty scored); Pearce (penalty missed); Saliba (penalty scored); Corbo (penalty scored); Vilsaint (penalty scored)	4–5	(penalty scored) McCarty; (penalty scored) Ríos; (penalty scored) Miranchuk; (penalty scored) Williams; (penalty scored) Lobzhanidze

Stade Saputo, Montreal, Quebec
Attendance: 16,566
Referee: Joe Dickerson

=== Western Conference ===
October 23
7:30 pm PDT

Vancouver Whitecaps FC	5–0	Portland Timbers
Gauld 20', 31', 59'; White 24'; Armstrong 51'	Report

Providence Park, Portland, Oregon (Note: Due to a scheduling conflict at BC Place, the match was played at Providence Park, with the Vancouver Whitecaps serving as the home team.)
Attendance: 19,143
Referee: Rubiel Vazquez

== Round one ==
Team 1	Series	Team 2	Game 1	Game 2	Game 3
Eastern Conference
Inter Miami CF	1–2	Atlanta United FC	2–1	1–2	2–3
Columbus Crew	0–2	New York Red Bulls	0–1	2–2 (4–5 p)	—
FC Cincinnati	1–2	New York City FC	1–0	1–3	0–0 (5–6 p)
Orlando City SC	2–1	Charlotte FC	2–0	0–0 (1–3 p)	1–1 (4–1 p)
Western Conference
Los Angeles FC	2–1	Vancouver Whitecaps FC	2–1	0–3	1–0
LA Galaxy	2–0	Colorado Rapids	5–0	4–1	—
Real Salt Lake	0–2	Minnesota United FC	0–0 (4–5 p)	1–1 (1–3 p)	—
Seattle Sounders FC	2–0	Houston Dynamo FC	0–0 (5–4 p)	1–1 (7–6 p)	—

=== Eastern Conference ===
October 25
8:30 pm EDT

Inter Miami CF	2–1	Atlanta United FC
Suárez 2'; Alba 60'	Report	Lobzhanidze 39'

Chase Stadium, Fort Lauderdale, Florida
Attendance: 20,673
Referee: Allen Chapman
November 2
7:00 PM EDT

Atlanta United FC	2–1	Inter Miami CF
Williams 58'; Silva 90+4'	Report	Martínez 40'

Mercedes-Benz Stadium, Atlanta, Georgia
Attendance: 68,455
Referee: Rubiel Vazquez
November 9
8:00 PM EST

Inter Miami CF	2–3	Atlanta United FC
Rojas 17'; Messi 65'	Report	Thiaré 19', 21'; Slisz 76'

Chase Stadium, Fort Lauderdale, Florida
Attendance: 20,813
Referee: Lukasz Szpala

Atlanta United FC won the series 2–1.

October 29
6:45 PM EDT

Columbus Crew	0–1	New York Red Bulls
	Report	Carballo 25'

Lower.com Field, Columbus, Ohio
Attendance: 19,050
Referee: Tim Ford
November 3
4:30 PM EST

New York Red Bulls	2–2	Columbus Crew
Vanzeir 64'; Forsberg 80' (pen.)	Report	Arfsten 55'; Ramirez 90+6'
Penalties
Tolkin (penalty missed); Eile (penalty scored); Carmona (penalty scored); Elias Manoel (penalty scored); Forsberg (penalty scored); S. Nealis (penalty missed); Edelman (penalty scored)	5–4	(penalty scored) Rossi; (penalty scored) Ramirez; (penalty scored) Hernández; (penalty scored) Russell-Rowe; (penalty missed) Cheberko; (penalty missed) Arfsten; (penalty missed) Mățan

Red Bull Arena, Harrison, New Jersey
Attendance: 20,936
Referee: Filip Dujic

New York Red Bulls won the series 2–0.

October 28
6:45 PM EDT

FC Cincinnati	1–0	New York City FC
Asad 51'	Report

TQL Stadium, Cincinnati, Ohio
Attendance: 21,413
Referee: Serhiy Boyko
November 2
5:00 PM EDT

New York City FC	3–1	FC Cincinnati
Martínez 22'; Thiago Martins 40'; Rodríguez 90+7' (pen.)	Report	Orellano 65'

Citi Field, New York City, New York
Attendance: 19,585
Referee: Ismir Pekmic
November 9
4:00 PM EST

FC Cincinnati	0–0	New York City FC
	Report
Penalties
Acosta (penalty scored); Asad (penalty scored); Santos (penalty scored); Bucha (penalty missed); Kelsy (penalty scored); Robinson (penalty scored); Valenzuela (penalty missed); Awaziem (penalty missed); Hadebe (penalty missed)	5–6	(penalty scored) Rodríguez; (penalty scored) Bakrar; (penalty scored) Parks; (penalty scored) Sands; (penalty missed) Thiago Martins; (penalty scored) Haak; (penalty missed) O'Toole; (penalty missed) Perea; (penalty scored) Ilenič

TQL Stadium, Cincinnati, Ohio
Attendance: 22,487
Referee: Drew Fischer

New York City FC won the series 2–1.

October 27
7:30 pm EDT

Orlando City SC	2–0	Charlotte FC
Torres 32'; Ojeda 76'	Report

Inter&Co Stadium, Orlando, Florida
Attendance: 17,787
Referee: Drew Fischer
November 1
7:30 PM EDT

Charlotte FC	0–0	Orlando City SC
	Report
Penalties
Agyemang (penalty scored); Świderski (penalty scored); Westwood (penalty scored)	3–1	(penalty missed) Lodeiro; (penalty missed) Jansson; (penalty scored) Muriel; (penalty missed) McGuire

Bank of America Stadium, Charlotte, North Carolina
Attendance: 40,238
Referee: Guido Gonzales Jr.
November 9
6:00 PM EST

Orlando City SC	1–1	Charlotte FC
Torres 90+12'	Report	Świderski 81'
Penalties
Muriel (penalty scored); Smith (penalty scored); Torres (penalty scored); Rafael Santos (penalty scored)	4–1	(penalty missed) Biel; (penalty missed) Świderski; (penalty scored) Westwood

Inter&Co Stadium, Orlando, Florida
Attendance: 20,021
Referee: Ismir Pekmic

Orlando City SC won the series 2–1.

=== Western Conference ===
October 27
6:45 PM PDT

Los Angeles FC	2–1	Vancouver Whitecaps FC
Bouanga 30' (pen.); Olivera 57'	Report	Gauld 90+5'

BMO Stadium, Los Angeles, California
Attendance: 22,298
Referee: Jair Marrufo
November 3
5:45 PM PST

Vancouver Whitecaps FC	3–0	Los Angeles FC
Gauld 10'; Hollingshead 13' (o.g.); Segura 68' (o.g.)	Report

BC Place, Vancouver, British Columbia
Attendance: 20,695
Referee: Rosendo Mendoza
November 8
7:30 pm PST

Los Angeles FC	1–0	Vancouver Whitecaps FC
Bogusz 62'	Report

BMO Stadium, Los Angeles, California
Attendance: 22,220
Referee: Joe Dickerson

Los Angeles FC won the series 2–1.

October 26
8:00 pm PDT

LA Galaxy	5–0	Colorado Rapids
Joveljić 32', 75'; Nelson 52'; Puig 54', 87'	Report

Dignity Health Sports Park, Carson, California
Attendance: 24,537
Referee: Lukasz Szpala
November 1
7:30 pm MDT

Colorado Rapids	1–4	LA Galaxy
Larraz 19'	Report	Gabriel Pec 8'; Paintsil 45+3'; Puig 90+1', 90+4'

Dick's Sporting Goods Park, Commerce City, Colorado
Attendance: 16,010
Referee: Victor Rivas

LA Galaxy won the series 2–0.

October 29
7:00 pm MDT

Real Salt Lake	0–0	Minnesota United FC
	Report
Penalties
Arango (penalty scored); Gonçalves (penalty scored); Glad (penalty missed); Julio (penalty scored); Eneli (penalty scored); Ojeda (penalty missed)	4–5	(penalty scored) Yeboah; (penalty scored) Trapp; (penalty missed) Boxall; (penalty scored) Jeong Sang-bin; (penalty scored) Oluwaseyi; (penalty scored) Díaz

America First Field, Sandy, Utah
Attendance: 19,195
Referee: Pierre-Luc Lauzière
November 2
8:00 pm CDT

Minnesota United FC	1–1	Real Salt Lake
Rosales 53'	Report	Eneli 75'
Penalties
Yeboah (penalty scored); Dotson (penalty scored); Trapp (penalty missed); Jeong Sang-bin (penalty scored)	3–1	(penalty scored) Arango; (penalty missed) Gonçalves; (penalty missed) Crooks; (penalty missed) Luna

Allianz Field, Saint Paul, Minnesota
Attendance: 19,912
Referee: Tori Penso

Minnesota United FC won the series 2–0.

October 28
6:00 pm PDT

Seattle Sounders FC	0–0	Houston Dynamo FC
	Report
Penalties
Ruidíaz (penalty scored); Rusnák (penalty scored); Ragen (penalty scored); C. Roldan (penalty scored); A. Roldán (penalty scored)	5–4	(penalty scored) Ponce; (penalty scored) Dorsey; (penalty scored) Kowalczyk; (penalty missed) Sviatchenko; (penalty scored) Steres

Lumen Field, Seattle, Washington
Attendance: 30,026
Referee: Ted Unkel
November 3
5:30 pm CST

Houston Dynamo FC	1–1	Seattle Sounders FC
C. Roldan 90+3' (o.g.)	Report	C. Roldan 87'
Penalties
Ponce (penalty scored); Dorsey (penalty scored); Kowalczyk (penalty scored); Ferreira (penalty scored); Steres (penalty scored); Raines (penalty scored); Schmitt (penalty missed)	6–7	(penalty scored) C. Roldan; (penalty scored) Ragen; (penalty scored) A. Roldán; (penalty scored) Leyva; (penalty scored) Ruidíaz; (penalty scored) Minoungou; (penalty scored) Vargas

Shell Energy Stadium, Houston, Texas
Attendance: 18,859
Referee: Armando Villarreal

Seattle Sounders FC won the series 2–0.

== Conference semifinals ==
The higher-seeded team as determined by regular season ranking hosted the match.

Home team	Score	Away team
Eastern Conference
Orlando City SC	1–0	Atlanta United FC
New York City FC	0–2	New York Red Bulls
Western Conference
Los Angeles FC	1–2 (a.e.t.)	Seattle Sounders FC
LA Galaxy	6–2	Minnesota United FC

=== Eastern Conference ===
November 23
5:30 PM EST

New York City FC	0–2	New York Red Bulls
	Report	Carballo 16'; Vanzeir 25'

Citi Field, New York City, New York
Attendance: 24,891
Referee: Allen Chapman

November 24
3:30 PM EST

Orlando City SC	1–0	Atlanta United FC
Enrique 39'	Report

Inter&Co Stadium, Orlando, Florida
Attendance: 25,055
Referee: Armando Villarreal

=== Western Conference ===
November 23
7:30 PM PST

Los Angeles FC	1–2 (a.e.t.)	Seattle Sounders FC
Hollingshead 50'	Report	Chanot 59' (o.g.); Morris 109'

BMO Stadium, Los Angeles, California
Attendance: 22,301
Referee: Guido Gonzales Jr.

November 24
3:00 PM PST

LA Galaxy	6–2	Minnesota United FC
Gabriel Pec 1', 50'; Joveljić 18', 89'; Paintsil 37', 86'	Report	Yeboah 6', 45+4' (pen.)

Dignity Health Sports Park, Carson, California
Attendance: 26,192
Referee: Rosendo Mendoza

== Conference finals ==
The higher-seeded team as determined by regular season ranking hosted the match.

Home team	Score	Away team
Eastern Conference
Orlando City SC	0–1	New York Red Bulls
Western Conference
LA Galaxy	1–0	Seattle Sounders FC

=== Eastern Conference ===
November 30
7:30 PM EST

Orlando City SC	0–1	New York Red Bulls
	Report	Reyes 47'

Inter&Co Stadium, Orlando, Florida
Attendance: 25,046
Referee: Rosendo Mendoza

=== Western Conference ===
November 30
7:00 PM PST

LA Galaxy	1–0	Seattle Sounders FC
Joveljić 85'	Report

Dignity Health Sports Park, Carson, California
Attendance: 26,327
Referee: Drew Fischer

== MLS Cup 2024 ==
The highest-ranked finalist in the overall Supporters' Shield table (LA Galaxy) hosted the match.

December 7, 2024
1:10 p.m. PST

LA Galaxy	2–1	New York Red Bulls
Paintsil 9'; Joveljić 13'	Report	S. Nealis 28'

Dignity Health Sports Park, Carson, California
Attendance: 26,812
Referee: Guido Gonzales Jr.

== Top goalscorers ==
Rank	Player	Club	Goals
1	(Serbia) Dejan Joveljić	LA Galaxy	6
2	(Scotland) Ryan Gauld	Vancouver Whitecaps FC	5
3	(Ghana) Joseph Paintsil	LA Galaxy	4
3	(Spain) Riqui Puig	LA Galaxy	4
5	(Brazil) Gabriel Pec	LA Galaxy	3
6	(Uruguay) Felipe Carballo	New York Red Bulls	2
6	(Venezuela) Josef Martínez	CF Montréal	2
6	(Senegal) Jamal Thiaré	Atlanta United FC	2
6	(Uruguay) Facundo Torres	Orlando City SC	2
6	(Belgium) Dante Vanzeir	New York Red Bulls	2
6	(Italy) Kelvin Yeboah	Minnesota United FC	2
