= Lewis Morgan (footballer) =

Scottish footballer (born 1996)

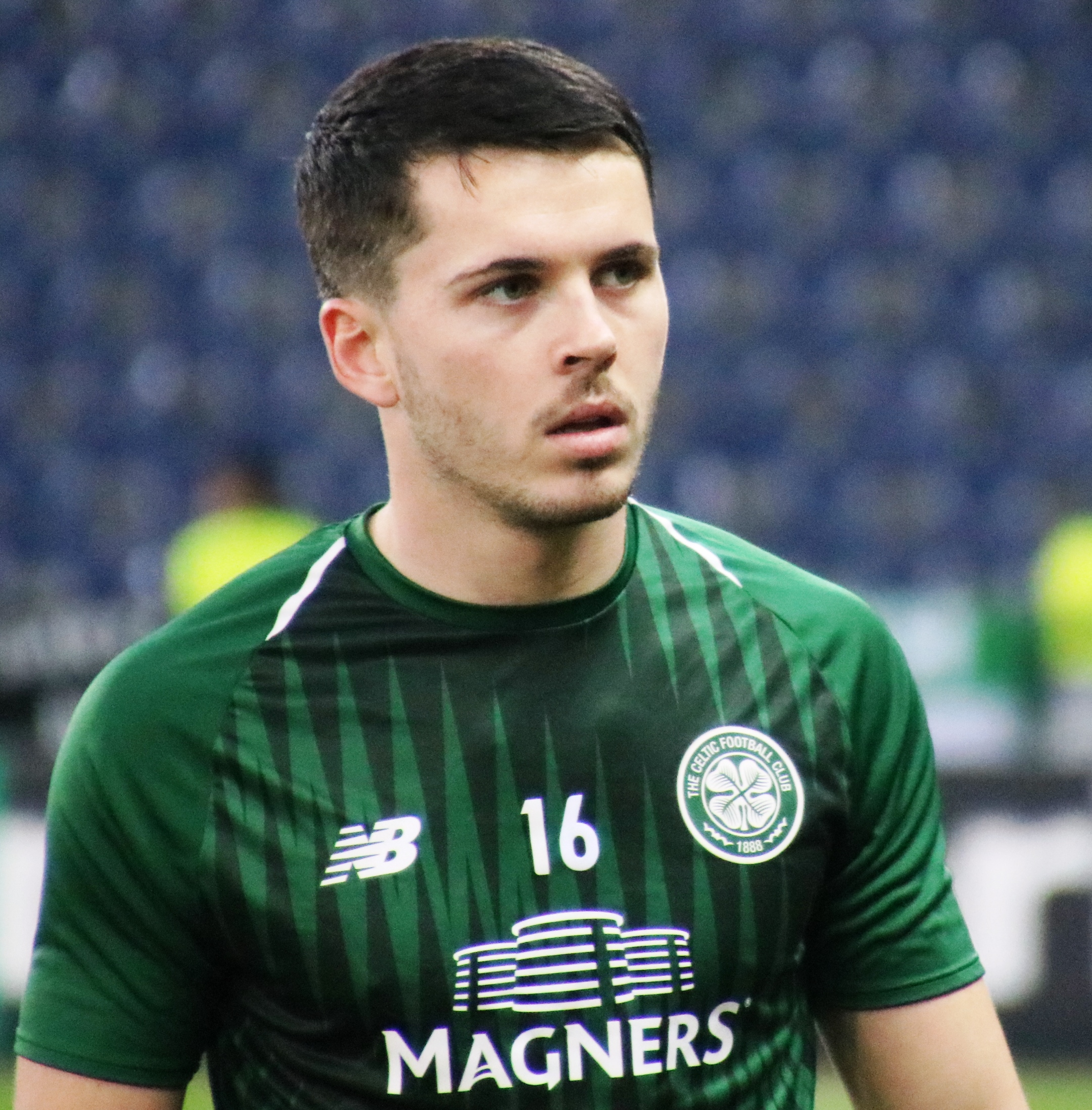
- Morgan with Celtic in 2018

Personal information
- Full name: Lewis Anthony Morgan
- Date of birth: 30 September 1996 (age 30)
- Place of birth: Greenock, Inverclyde, Scotland
- Height: 5 ft 10 in (1.78 m)
- Positions: Forward; left winger

Team information
- Current team: Toronto FC
- Number: 90

Youth career
- 2004–2013: Rangers
- 2013–2014: St Mirren

Senior career*
Years	Team	Apps	(Gls)
2014–2018	St Mirren	79	(16)
2018–2020	Celtic	14	(0)
2018	→ St Mirren (loan)	15	(5)
2019	→ Sunderland (loan)	17	(1)
2020–2021	Inter Miami	57	(7)
2021–2025	New York Red Bulls	69	(27)
2026	San Diego FC	13	(0)
2026–	Toronto FC	10	(3)

International career^{‡}
2017–2018	Scotland U21	9	(2)
2018–	Scotland	7	(0)
- * Club domestic league appearances and goals as of 03:38, 8 November 2026 (UTC) ‡ National team caps and goals as of 21:01, 18 August 2025 (UTC)

Lewis Anthony Morgan (born 30 September 1996) is a Scottish professional footballer who plays as a forward or left winger for Major League Soccer club Toronto FC and the Scotland national team.

Morgan has previously played for Celtic, St Mirren, Sunderland, Inter Miami, the New York Red Bulls, and San Diego FC. He made his first international appearance for Scotland in May 2018.

== Club career ==
=== St Mirren ===
Morgan started his career in the Rangers youth system before joining St Mirren on a two-year contract in September 2013. Morgan made his debut for St Mirren on 27 September 2014 in a 2–1 home defeat to Celtic in the Scottish Premiership.

On 14 May 2015, Morgan signed a two-year extension to his contract, running until 2017. After breaking into the first team, Morgan signed a further one-year contract extension in August 2016, tying him to the club until 2018.

=== Celtic ===
==== 2017–18 ====
On 5 January 2018, Morgan signed a four-and-a-half-year contract with Celtic and was immediately loaned back to St Mirren until the end of the season, helping the club to win the 2017–18 Scottish Championship and achieve promotion.

==== 2018–19 ====
He was given the number 16 jersey upon moving to Celtic. On 10 July 2018, Morgan made his Celtic debut as a substitute in a 3–0 away win over Armenian side Alashkert in the first leg of the first qualifying round of the 2018–19 UEFA Champions League competition.

Morgan was loaned to Sunderland on 31 January 2019. He scored his first Sunderland goal in an EFL Trophy semi-final win over Bristol Rovers. Morgan scored his only league goal for Sunderland on 19 April 2019 in a 2–0 home win against Doncaster Rovers.

==== 2019–20 ====
In the absence of the injured Odsonne Edouard, Morgan played as a striker for Celtic in several matches in late 2019, beginning with a match against Rennes in the UEFA Europa League in which he scored the opening goal of a 3–1 victory.

=== Inter Miami ===
In January 2020, Celtic accepted an offer for Morgan from the newly-established Major League Soccer club Inter Miami. Morgan accepted terms on a reported three-year deal with the club. Morgan made his debut for Inter Miami in their inaugural match, a 1–0 defeat against Los Angeles FC on 1 March. On 9 September 2020, he scored two goals in a 2–1 win over Atlanta United.

=== New York Red Bulls ===
On 12 December 2021, Inter Miami CF traded Lewis Morgan to the New York Red Bulls for $1.2 million in general allocation money (GAM). On 26 February 2022, Morgan made his debut for New York, appearing as a starter in a 3–1 victory over San Jose Earthquakes in the opening match of the season. On 5 March 2022, Morgan scored a hat-trick in the first half to lead New York to a 4–1 victory over Toronto FC. Morgan was named MLS Player of the Week for Week 2 of the 2022 season. On 28 May, Morgan scored a spectacular goal to help lead New York to a 4–1 victory over rival D.C. United. On 22 June, Morgan helped New York to advance to the semi-finals of the 2022 U.S. Open Cup, scoring the opening goal of the match in a 3–0 victory over local rival New York City FC. On 27 August 2022, Morgan opened the scoring for New York in a 3–1 victory against his former club Inter Miami. On 31 August 2022, Morgan scored the lone goal of the match in a 1–0 victory over CF Montréal, helping New York to its record ninth away win of the season. On 18 November, Morgan was named New York Red Bulls Team MVP for the 2022 season.

On 13 January 2023, Morgan penned a 3-year deal with the Red Bulls, keeping him at the club until the end of the 2025 season, with a club option for an additional year. During the 2023 season Morgan suffered a hip injury, which required surgery, and was limited to only six appearances.

On 2 March 2024, Morgan scored his first goal of the season, the winning goal for New York in a 2–1 victory over Houston Dynamo FC. On 23 March 2024, Morgan scored a hat-trick in a 4–0 win over Inter Miami. On 20 July 2024, Morgan scored twice in a 3–1 victory over FC Cincinnati. Morgan was the Red Bulls' top scorer of the 2024 season with 13 goals, and on 6 November 2024, he was named Major League Soccer Comeback Player of the Year.

=== San Diego FC ===
On 16 December 2025, San Diego FC acquired Morgan and $525,000 in GAM on a one-year contract with a club option for a further two years in exchange for up to $1.1 million in GAM and their natural third-round pick in the 2027 MLS SuperDraft.

=== Toronto FC ===
On 2 September 2026, Toronto FC announced they had acquired Morgan from San Diego in exchange for an international roster slot.

== International career ==
In May 2018, Alex McLeish called Morgan into the senior Scotland squad for friendly matches against Peru and Mexico. He made his full Scotland debut on 29 May 2018, in a 2–0 defeat to Peru.

Morgan was recalled to the Scotland squad in June 2024, ahead of UEFA Euro 2024. He made one appearance at the tournament, coming on as an 89th minute substitute for captain Andrew Robertson against Hungary as Scotland finished bottom of Group A with one point from three matches.

== Career statistics ==
=== Club ===
As of match played 7 November 2026

Appearances and goals by club, season and competition
Club	Season	League			National cup (Note: Includes Scottish Cup, U.S. Open Cup)		League cup (Note: Includes Scottish League Cup)		Continental		Other		Total	
Club	Season	Division	Apps	Goals	Apps	Goals	Apps	Goals	Apps	Goals	Apps	Goals	Apps	Goals
St Mirren	2014–15	Scottish Premiership	8	0	0	0	0	0	—		0	0	8	0
St Mirren	2015–16	Scottish Championship	18	1	0	0	1	0	—		3 (Note: Appearance(s) in Scottish Challenge Cup)	0	22	1
St Mirren	2016–17	Scottish Championship	33	6	4	2	4	1	—		5	1	46	10
St Mirren	2017–18	Scottish Championship	20	9	1	1	4	2	—		1	1	26	13
St Mirren	Total		94	21	6	3	9	3	—		9	2	118	29
St Mirren (loan)	2017–18	Scottish Championship	15	5	1	0	0	0	—		0	0	16	5
Celtic	2017–18	Scottish Premiership	0	0	0	0	0	0	—		0	0	0	0
Celtic	2018–19	Scottish Premiership	9	0	0	0	1	0	3 (Note: One appearance in UEFA Champions League, two appearances in UEFA Europa League)	0	—		13	0
Celtic	2019–20	Scottish Premiership	5	0	0	0	3	0	10 (Note: Six appearances in UEFA Champions League, four appearances and two goals in UEFA Europa League)	2	—		18	2
Celtic	Total		14	0	0	0	4	0	13	2	—		31	2
Sunderland (loan)	2018–19	League One	17	1	0	0	0	0	—		5 (Note: Two appearances and one goal in EFL Trophy, three appearances in League One play-offs)	1	22	2
Inter Miami CF	2020	Major League Soccer	23 (Note: Includes three appearances in MLS is Back Tournament group stage)	5	—		—		—		1 (Note: Appearance in MLS Cup playoffs)	0	24	5
Inter Miami CF	2021	Major League Soccer	34	2	—		—		—		—		34	2
Inter Miami CF	Total		57	7	—		—		—		1	0	58	7
New York Red Bulls	2022	Major League Soccer	32	14	4	3	—		—		1	1	37	18
New York Red Bulls	2023	Major League Soccer	5	0	0	0	—		—		1 (Note: Appearance(s) in Leagues Cup)	0	6	0
New York Red Bulls	2024	Major League Soccer	29	13	—		—		—		7 (Note: Two appearances in Leagues Cup, five appearances in MLS Cup playoffs)	0	36	13
New York Red Bulls	2025	Major League Soccer	3	0	—		—		—		0	0	3	0
New York Red Bulls	Total		69	27	4	3	0	0	—		9	1	82	31
San Diego FC	2026	Major League Soccer	13	0	—		—		2 (Note: Appearances in CONCACAF Champions Cup)	0	3	0	18	0
Toronto FC	2026	Major League Soccer	10	3	—		—		—		—		10	3
Career total			274	59	10	6	13	4	15	2	27	4	339	74

== Honours ==
Sunderland

- EFL Trophy runner-up: 2018–19

Celtic

- Scottish League Cup: 2019–20

Individual

- MLS Comeback Player of the Year: 2024
