= Sergio de los Ríos =

Mexican footballer (born 2003)

Personal information
- Full name: Sergio de los Ríos Peztña
- Date of birth: 28 June 2003 (age 23)
- Place of birth: Miguel Hidalgo, Mexico City, Mexico
- Height: 1.82 m (6 ft 0 in)
- Position: Attacking midfielder

Team information
- Current team: Cruz Azul Hidalgo
- Number: 47

Youth career
- 2018–2023: América

Senior career*
Years	Team	Apps	(Gls)
2022–2023	América	2	(0)
2024	Pachuca	5	(0)
2025	Cancún	13	(1)
2025–2026	Zacatecas	33	(3)
2026–	Cruz Azul Hidalgo	14	(2)

International career
2019	Mexico U16	4	(0)
- * Club domestic league appearances and goals as of 31 October 2026

Sergio de los Ríos Peztña (born 28 June 2003) is a Mexican professional footballer who plays as an attacking midfielder for Liga de Expansión MX club Cruz Azul Hidalgo.

== Career statistics ==
As of match played on 31 October 2026

Club	Season	League			Cup		Continental		Other		Total	
Club	Season	Division	Apps	Goals	Apps	Goals	Apps	Goals	Apps	Goals	Apps	Goals
América	2022–23	Liga MX	1	0	—		—		—		1	0
América	2023–24	Liga MX	1	0	—		—		—		1	0
América	Total		2	0	—		—		—		2	0
Pachuca	2024–25	Liga MX	5	0	—		—		3 (Note: Appearances in Leagues Cup)	0	8	0
Cancún	2024–25	Liga de Expansión MX	13	1	—		—		—		13	1
Zacatecas	2025–26	Liga de Expansión MX	33	3	—		—		—		33	3
Cruz Azul Hidalgo	2026–27	Liga de Expansión MX	14	2	—		—		—		14	2
Career total			67	6	0	0	0	0	3	0	70	6

== Honours ==
Mexico U20

- Revelations Cup: 2022
