= Wikelman Carmona =

Venezuelan football player (born 2003)

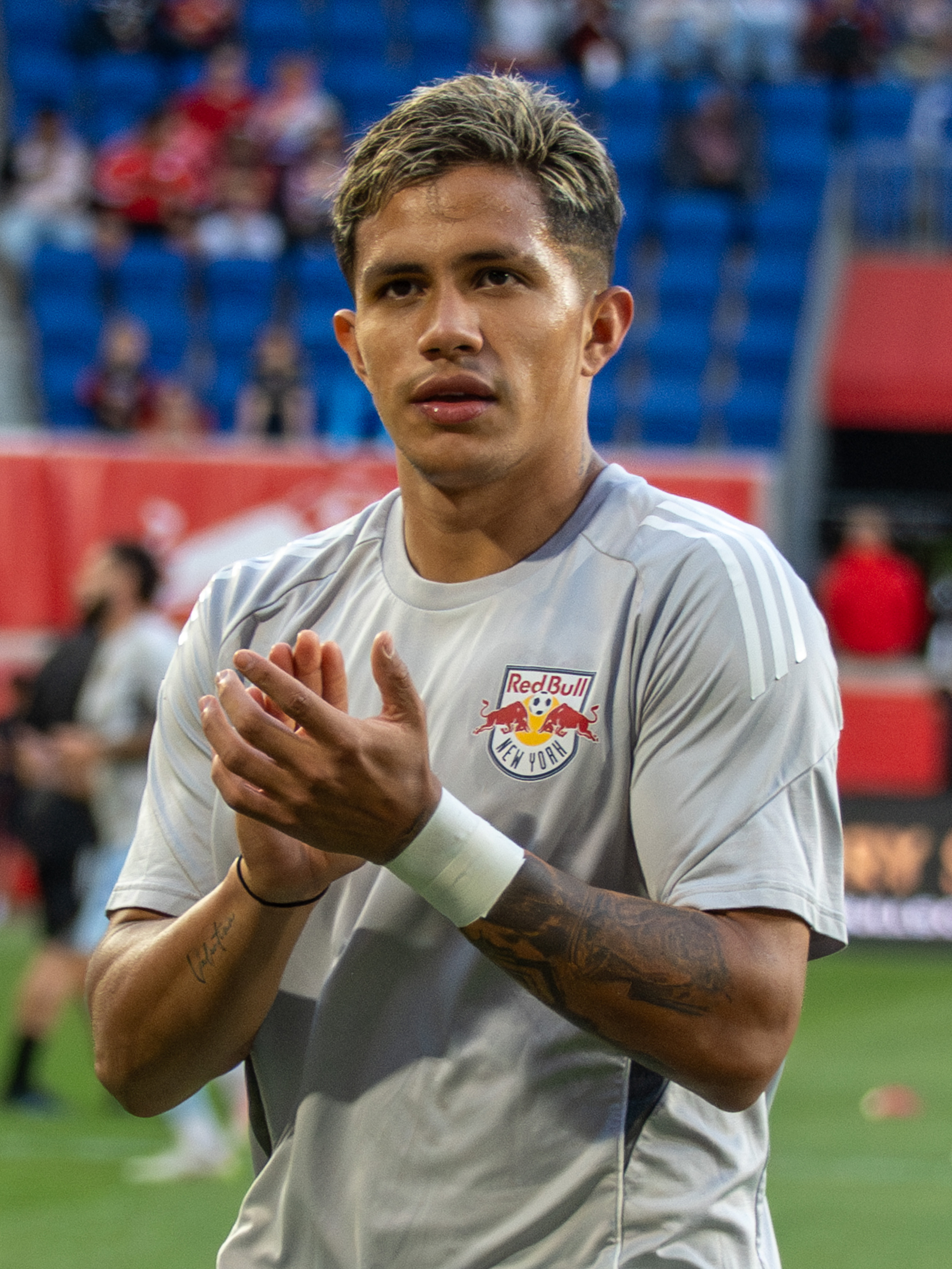
- Carmona in 2025

Personal information
- Full name: Wikelman José Carmona Torres
- Date of birth: 24 February 2003 (age 23)
- Place of birth: Valle de la Pascua, Venezuela
- Height: 5 ft 11 in (1.80 m)
- Position: Attacking midfielder

Team information
- Current team: CF Montréal
- Number: 16

Youth career
- 2016–2021: Academia Dynamo

Senior career*
Years	Team	Apps	(Gls)
2021–2026	New York Red Bulls	102	(5)
2021	→ New York Red Bulls II (loan)	29	(10)
2026–	CF Montréal	17	(4)

International career^{‡}
2019	Venezuela U17	3	(1)
2023	Venezuela U20	5	(0)
2025–	Venezuela	5	(0)
Medal record
Men's football
Representing Venezuela
FIFA Series
Runner-up	2026 Uzbekistan
- * Club domestic league appearances and goals as of 22:25, 19 September 2026(UTC) ‡ National team caps and goals as of 22:03, 6 October 2026 (UTC)

Wikelman José Carmona Torres (born 24 February 2003), also known as Wiki Carmona, is a Venezuelan professional footballer who plays as a midfielder for Major League Soccer club CF Montréal and the Venezuela national team.

== Early life ==
Born in Valle de la Pascua, Carmona began his football career in 2016 at the Academia Dynamo FC on Margarita Island.

== Club career ==
=== New York Red Bulls ===
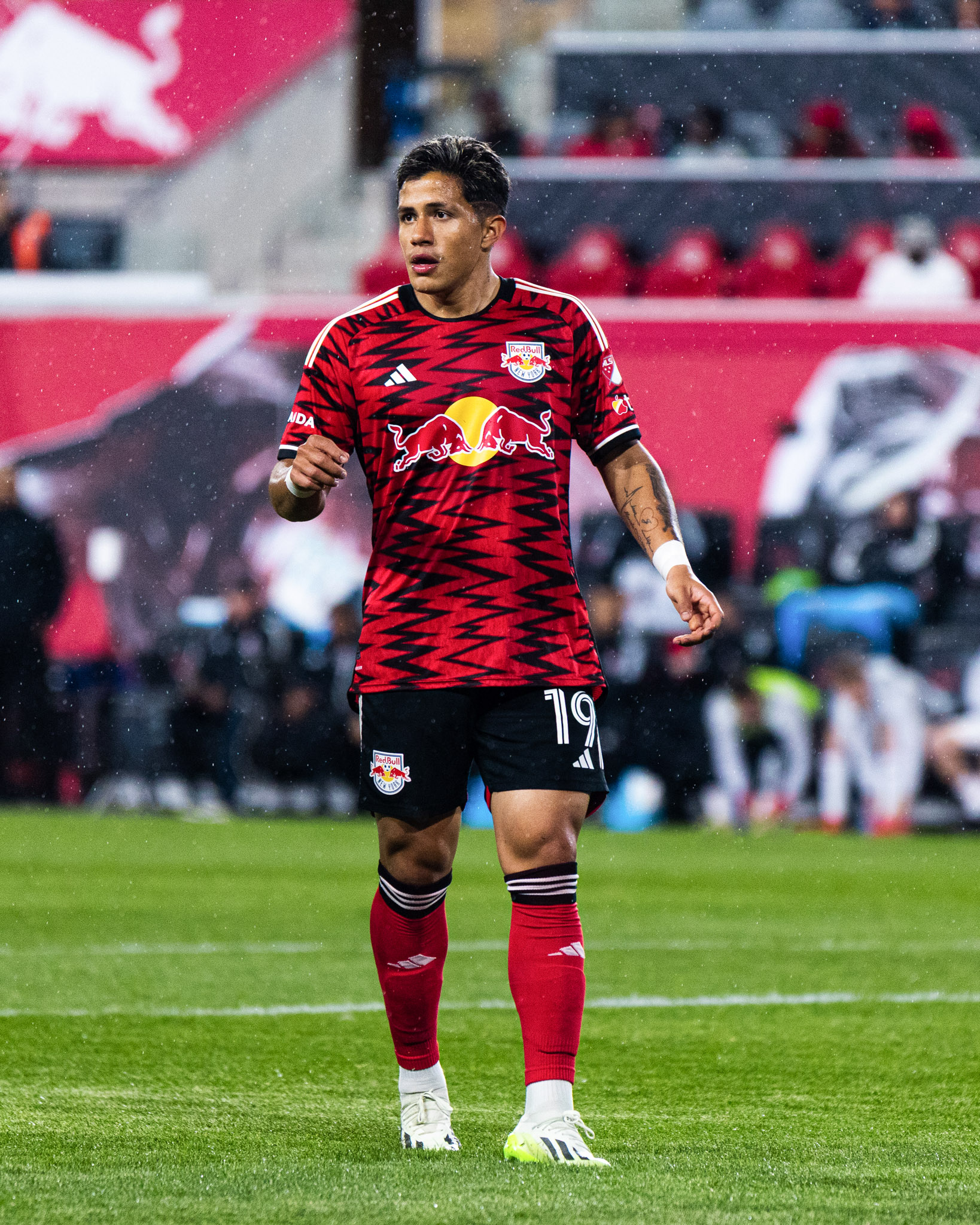
Carmona with the New York Red Bulls in 2025

On 25 January 2021, Carmona signed with Major League Soccer club New York Red Bulls. During the season, Carmona was loaned out to New York Red Bulls II, making his debut on 30 April 2021, starting in a 3–2 loss to Hartford Athletic. Carmona was recalled to the first team and on 17 April 2021, Carmona made his first-team debut, appearing in the second half in a 2–1 loss to Sporting Kansas City. On 31 July 2021, Carmona scored his first goal as a professional in a 2–3 loss to New England Revolution.

Carmona missed several months at the start of the 2022 season due to injury. Upon return, he was sent on loan to New York Red Bulls II. He scored his first goal in the USL Championship on 20 August 2022, in a 2–2 draw against Pittsburgh Riverhounds. He made his return to the first team on 31 August 2022, playing 20 minutes versus Impact de Montréal in a 1–0 victory.

Carmona began the 2023 season with New York Red Bulls II in MLS Next Pro, scoring three goals in the first four matches of the season. He was recalled to the first team, and on 8 July 2023 scored the game-winning goal for New York Red Bulls in a 2–1 victory over New England Revolution.

On 23 March 2024, Carmona scored his first goal of the season for New York in a 4–0 win over Inter Miami. On 19 June 2024, Carmona opened the scoring for New York in a 2–2 draw with Impact de Montréal. On 17 July 2024, he recorded another goal against the Impact in another 2–2 draw.

== International career ==
Carmona was a member of the Venezuela U17 team during the 2019 South American U-17 Championship in Peru, scoring in a 5–3 victory against Bolivia. He was called up to the Venezuela national team for a set of friendlies in October 2025. He made his debut a month later in a friendly against Australia.

== Career statistics ==
=== Club ===
As of match played 19 September 2026

Appearances and goals by club, season and competition
Club	Season	League			U.S. Open Cup		Continental		Other		Total	
Club	Season	Division	Apps	Goals	Apps	Goals	Apps	Goals	Apps	Goals	Apps	Goals
New York Red Bulls	2021	Major League Soccer	25	1	0	0	—		0	0	25	1
New York Red Bulls	2022	Major League Soccer	2	0	0	0	—		0	0	2	0
New York Red Bulls	2023	Major League Soccer	17	1	2	0	—		2 (Note: One appearance in MLS Cup playoffs, one appearance in Leagues Cup)	0	21	1
New York Red Bulls	2024	Major League Soccer	24	3	—		—		7 (Note: Five appearances in MLS Cup playoffs, two appearances in Leagues Cup)	0	31	3
New York Red Bulls	2025	Major League Soccer	34	0	3	1	—		2 (Note: Appearances in Leagues Cup)	0	39	1
New York Red Bulls	Total		102	5	5	1	0	0	11	0	118	6
New York Red Bulls II	2021	USL Championship	5	0	0	0	—		—		5	0
New York Red Bulls II	2022	USL Championship	13	1	0	0	—		—		13	1
New York Red Bulls II	2023	MLS Next Pro	10	8	0	0	—		2 (Note: Appearances in MLS Next Pro play-offs)	0	12	8
New York Red Bulls II	2024	MLS Next Pro	1	1	0	0	—		0	0	1	1
New York Red Bulls II	Total		29	10	0	0	—		2	0	31	10
CF Montréal	2026	Major League Soccer	17	4	0	0	—		2 (Note: Appearances in Canadian Championship)	1	19	5
Career total			148	19	5	1	0	0	15	1	168	21

=== International ===
As of match played 6 October 2026

Appearances and goals by national team and year
National team	Year	Apps	Goals
Venezuela
Venezuela	2025	1	0
2026	4	0	
Total		5	0

== Honours ==
Venezuela

- FIFA Series runner-up: 2026
