= Daniel Edelman (soccer) =

American soccer player (born 2003)

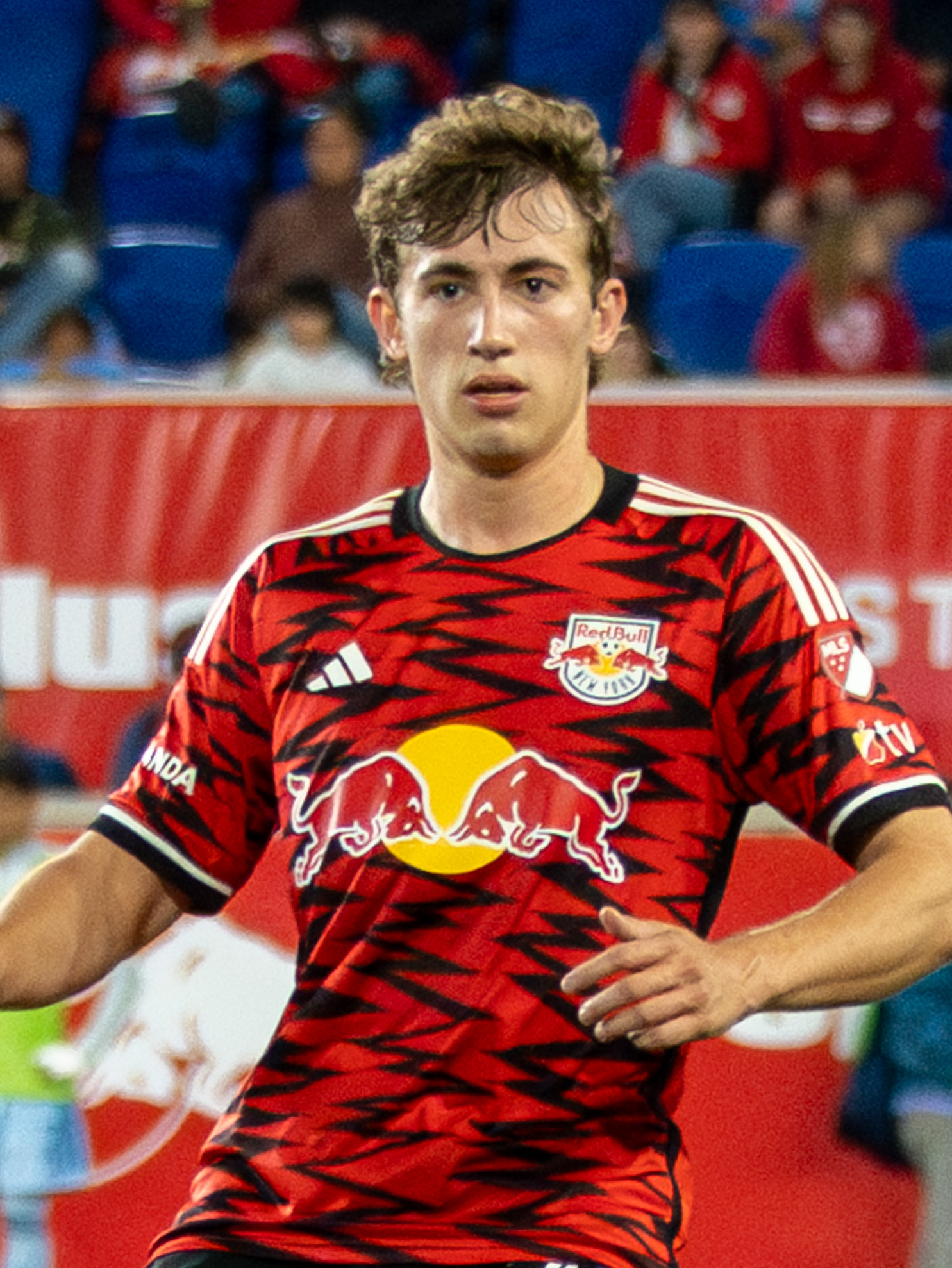
- Edelman in 2025

Personal information
- Full name: Daniel Ethan Edelman
- Date of birth: April 28, 2003 (age 23)
- Place of birth: Warren Township, New Jersey, United States
- Height: 5 ft 10 in (1.78 m)
- Position: Midfielder

Team information
- Current team: St. Louis City
- Number: 24

Youth career
- 2015–2020: PDA
- 2020: New York Red Bulls

Senior career*
Years	Team	Apps	(Gls)
2020–2023	New York Red Bulls II	41	(2)
2022–2026	New York Red Bulls	96	(3)
2026–	St. Louis City	24	(4)

International career^{‡}
2019	United States U16	4	(0)
2021–2023	United States U20	15	(0)
2024	United States U23	1	(0)
- * Club domestic league appearances and goals as of February 21, 2026 ‡ National team caps and goals as of March 22, 2024

Daniel Ethan Edelman (born April 28, 2003) is an American professional soccer player who plays as a midfielder for Major League Soccer club St. Louis City.

== Early life ==
Born in Warren Township, New Jersey, Edelman is Jewish. His parents are Ari, who played collegiate soccer at Loyola Maryland, and Patty, who is the all-time leading scorer in NCAA Division I women's basketball of schools in Maryland.

== Club career ==
=== Youth ===
He was part of the youth system at the Players Development Academy (PDA) from 2015 to 2020. He also played prep soccer at Watchung Hills Regional High School ('21). In 2020, Edelman joined the youth academy at Major League Soccer club New York Red Bulls.

=== New York Red Bulls ===
On July 17, 2020, Edelman was featured on the bench for New York Red Bulls II, the club's reserve affiliate, against Hartford Athletic. He came on as a late second-half substitute as Red Bulls II were defeated 0–1. He then scored his first professional goal in the next match against Philadelphia Union II in the 56th minute to help Red Bulls II to a 5–1 victory.

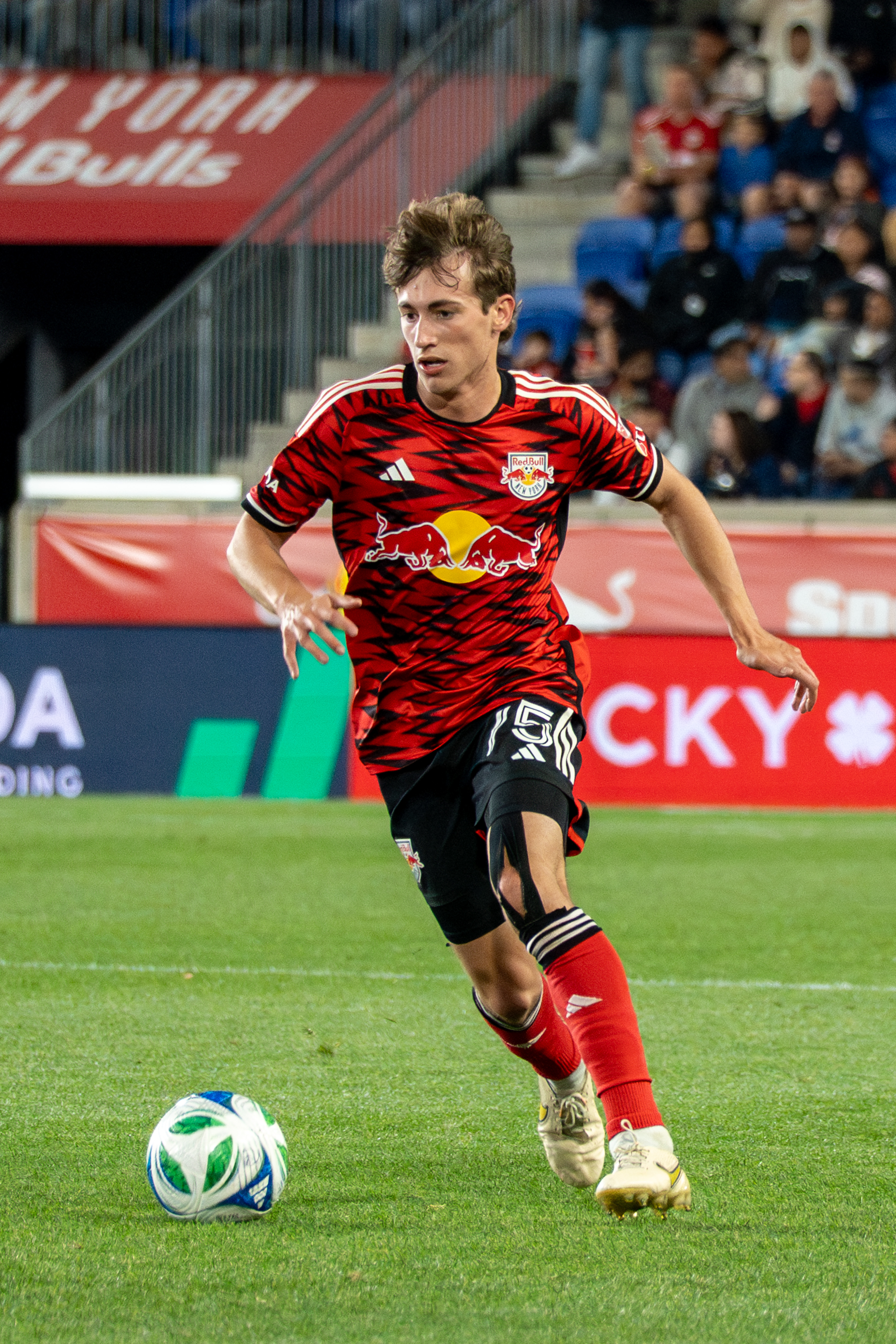
Daniel Edelman during New York Red Bulls vs Atlanta United on May 31 2025

On March 24, 2021, Edelman signed a professional contract with New York Red Bulls II for the 2021 season. He became a regular starter for coach John Wolyniec, starting in 28 matches and scoring once. He led the club in interceptions (54), tackles (87), tackles won (59), duels won (182), and passes (1,350).

On December 17, 2021, Edelman signed a homegrown player contract with New York Red Bulls starting from the 2022 season. On February 26, 2022, Edelman made his debut for the first team, coming on as a second-half substitute in a 3–1 victory over San Jose Earthquakes in the opening match of the season. On May 10, 2022, Edelman made his first start for New York in a 3–0 victory over D.C. United, helping the club advance to Round of 16 in the 2022 U.S. Open Cup. On July 24, 2022, Edelman made his first league start for New York in a 4–3 victory over Austin FC at Q2 Stadium. Edelman scored his first professional goal on August 27, 2022, in a 3–1 victory against Inter Miami.

On June 24, 2023, Edelman scored his first goal of the season for New York and assisted on another in a 4–0 victory over Atlanta United. On July 16, 2025, Edelman opened the scoring for New York in 5–3 victory over New England Revolution.

=== St. Louis City SC ===
Edelman joined St. Louis City on January 13, 2026.

== International career ==
Edelman has represented the United States at the under-16, under-20 (as captain) and under-23 levels.

== Career statistics ==
As of match played October 18, 2025

Appearances and goals by club, season and competition
Club	Season	League			U.S. Open Cup		Playoffs		Continental		Other		Total	
Club	Season	Division	Apps	Goals	Apps	Goals	Apps	Goals	Apps	Goals	Apps	Goals	Apps	Goals
New York Red Bulls II	2020	USL	5	1	—		—		—		—		5	1
New York Red Bulls II	2021	USL	30	1	—		—		—		—		30	1
New York Red Bulls II	2022	USL	4	0	—		—		—		—		4	0
New York Red Bulls II	2023	MLS Next Pro	2	0	—		—		—		—		2	0
New York Red Bulls II	Total		41	2	—		—		—		—		41	2
New York Red Bulls	2022	Major League Soccer	16	1	2	0	1	0	—		—		19	1
New York Red Bulls	2023	Major League Soccer	23	1	1	0	2	0	—		4 (Note: Appearances in Leagues Cup)	0	30	1
New York Red Bulls	2024	Major League Soccer	31	0	—		5	0	—		2	0	38	0
New York Red Bulls	2025	Major League Soccer	26	1	3	0	0	0	—		2	0	31	1
New York Red Bulls	Total		96	3	6	0	8	0	—		8	0	118	3
St. Louis City	2026	Major League Soccer	0	0	0	0	0	0	—		0	0	0	0
Career total			137	5	6	0	8	0	0	0	8	0	159	5

== Honors ==
St. Louis City SC

- U.S. Open Cup: 2026

United States U20

- CONCACAF U-20 Championship: 2022

== See also ==
- List of select Jewish soccer players
