= Noah Eile =

Swedish footballer (born 2002)

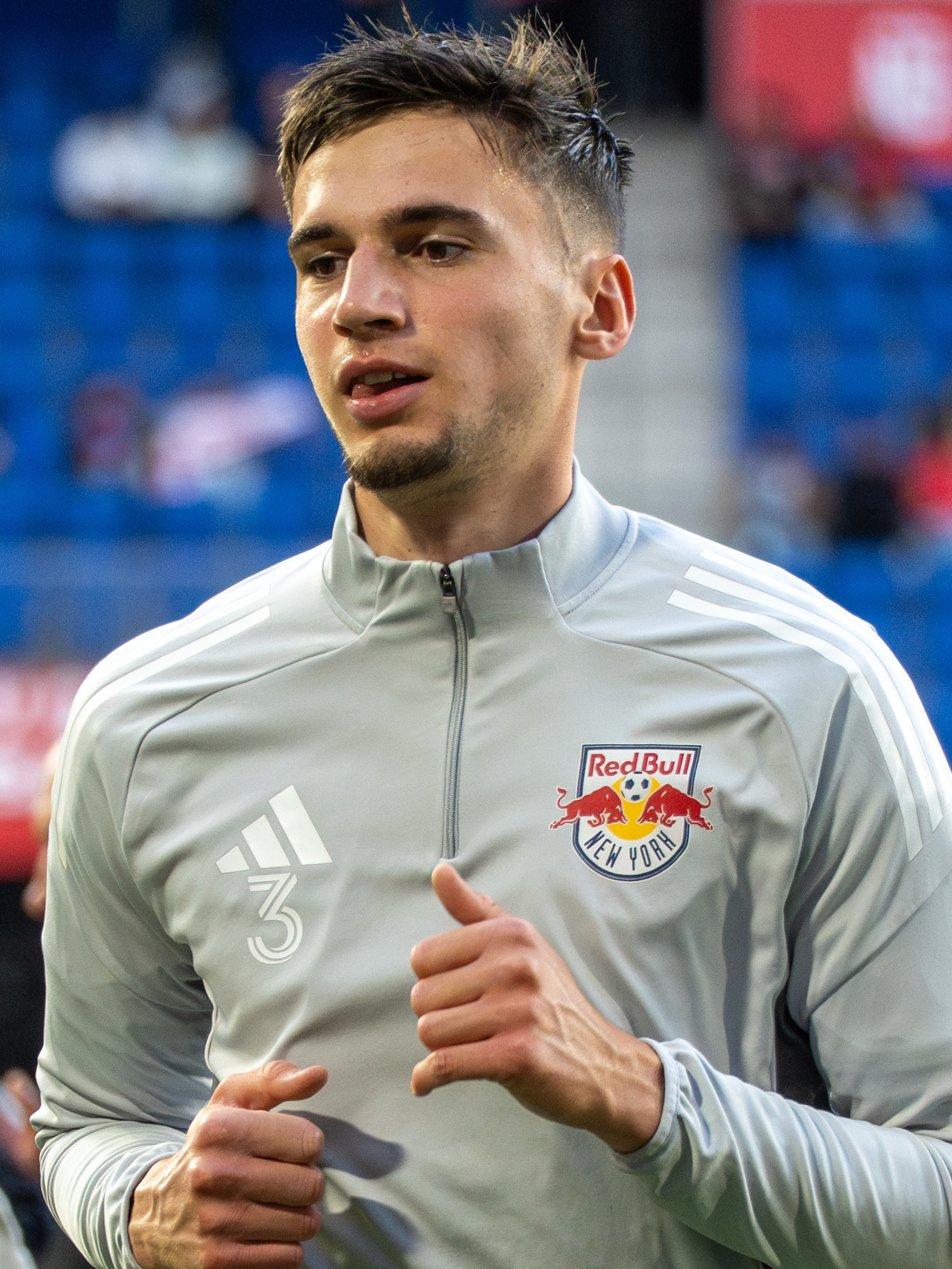
- Eile with the New York Red Bulls in 2025

Personal information
- Full name: Noah Johannes Eile
- Date of birth: 19 July 2002 (age 24)
- Place of birth: Lund, Sweden
- Height: 1.95 m (6 ft 5 in)
- Position: Centre-back

Team information
- Current team: Bristol City
- Number: 38

Youth career
- –2014: Bjärreds IF
- 2015–2020: Malmö FF

Senior career*
Years	Team	Apps	(Gls)
2021–2023	Malmö FF	3	(0)
2022	→ Mjällby (loan)	22	(0)
2023	→ Mjällby (loan)	24	(1)
2024–2026	New York Red Bulls	59	(1)
2026–	Bristol City	15	(1)

International career
2018–2019	Sweden U17	20	(1)
2019–2020	Sweden U19	4	(0)
2023–2024	Sweden U21	10	(0)
- * Club domestic league appearances and goals as of 21:52, 2 May 2026 (UTC)

Noah Johannes Eile (born 19 July 2002) is a Swedish professional footballer who plays as a centre-back for EFL Championship club Bristol City.

== Club career ==
=== Malmo FF ===
Born in Lund, Eile started his career with Bjärreds IF, before joining Malmö FF as a 12-year-old. On 8 December 2020, he signed his first professional contract, a contract until 2022. Eile made his Allsvenskan debut on 21 August 2021 in a 3–0 win over Degerfors IF, where he came on as a substitute in the 79th minute for Jo Inge Berget.

=== Mjällby ===
On 10 January 2022, Eile was loaned to Allsvenskan side Mjällby AIF on a season long loan. In March 2023, Eile was loaned out again to Mjällby on a loan agreement until 19 July 2023. On 29 October 2023, Eile scored his first goal as a professional in a 2–1 victory over BK Häcken.

=== New York Red Bulls ===
On 12 January 2024, Eile moved to Major League Soccer side New York Red Bulls on a four-year deal. On 25 February 2024, Eile made his debut for New York, appearing as a starter and maintaining a clean sheet in the opening match of the season, a 0–0 draw against Nashville SC.

On 26 April 2025, Eile scored his first goal for New York, in a 1–0 victory over CF Montréal.

=== Bristol City ===
On 2 February 2026, Eile joined EFL Championship club Bristol City signing a three-and-a-half-year contract. Noah scored his first goal for the club on 3 April 2026 in a 2–1 victory over Charlton Athletic.

== International career ==
Eile has played in various Swedish junior national teams, including the Swedish under-21 team. With the under-17, he took part, among other things, in the U17 European Championships in 2019.

== Career statistics ==
As of end of 2025–26 season

Appearances and goals by club, season and competition
Club	Season	League			National cup (Note: Includes Svenska Cupen, U.S. Open Cup, FA Cup)		Continental		Other		Total	
Club	Season	Division	Apps	Goals	Apps	Goals	Apps	Goals	Apps	Goals	Apps	Goals
Malmö FF	2021	Allsvenskan	3	0	0	0	1 (Note: Appearance in UEFA Champions League)	0	—		4	0
Mjällby AIF (loan)	2022	Allsvenskan	22	0	3	0	—		—		25	0
Mjällby AIF (loan)	2023	Allsvenskan	24	1	3	0	—		—		27	1
Mjällby AIF (loan)	Total		46	1	6	0	—		—		52	1
New York Red Bulls	2024	Major League Soccer	29	0	—		—		7 (Note: Five appearances in MLS Cup playoffs, two appearances in Leagues Cup)	0	36	0
New York Red Bulls	2025	Major League Soccer	30	1	3	0	—		3 (Note: Appearances in Leagues Cup)	0	36	1
New York Red Bulls	Total		59	1	3	0	—		10	0	72	1
Bristol City	2025–26	EFL Championship	15	1	1	0	—		—		16	1
Career total			123	3	10	0	1	0	10	0	144	3

== Honours ==
Malmö FF

- Allsvenskan: 2021
