= Sean Nealis =

American soccer player (born 1997)

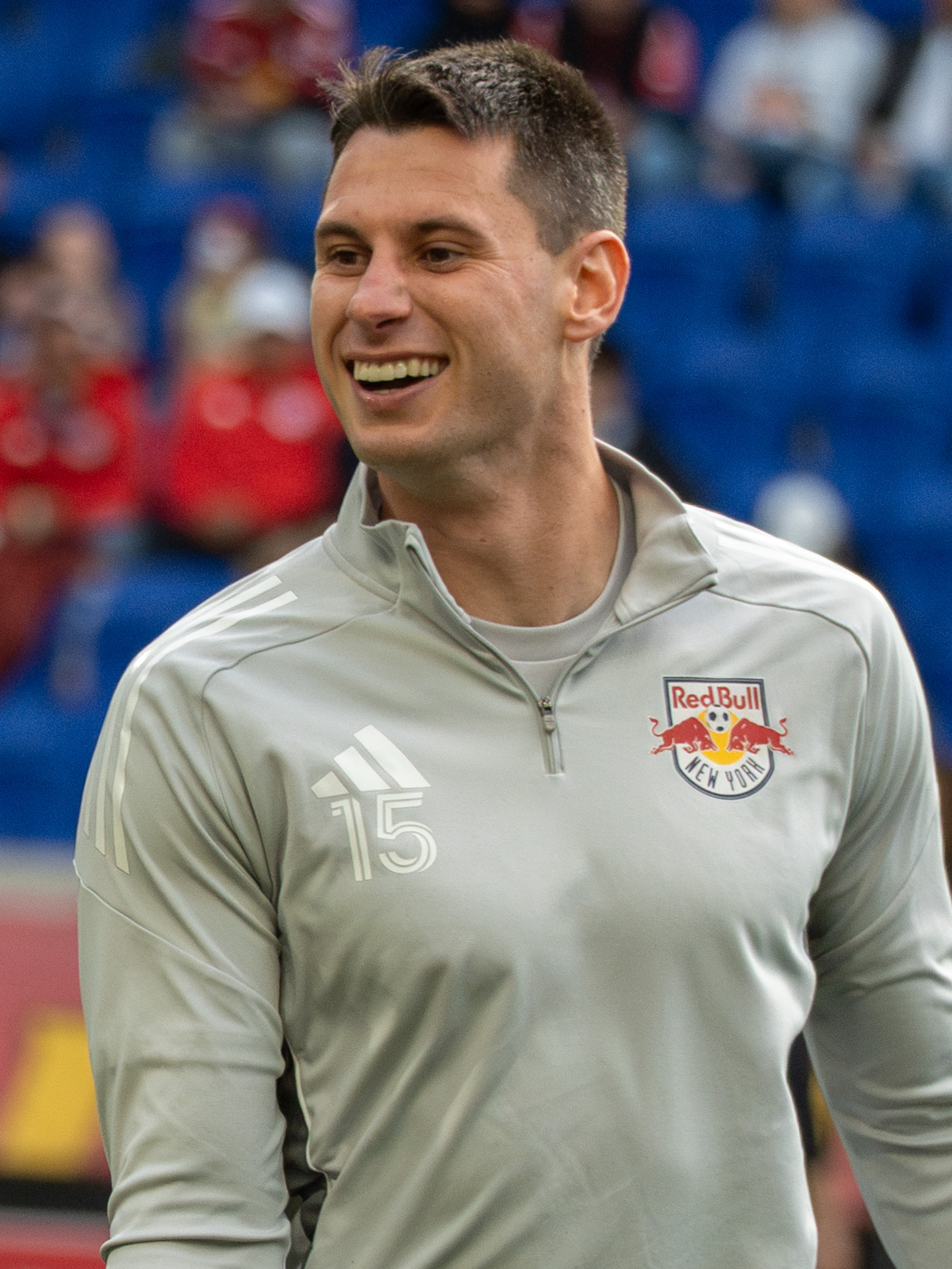
- Nealis in 2025

Personal information
- Full name: Sean Nealis
- Date of birth: January 13, 1997 (age 29)
- Place of birth: Massapequa, New York, US
- Height: 6 ft 4 in (1.93 m)
- Position: Defender

Team information
- Current team: D.C. United
- Number: 13

College career
Years	Team	Apps	(Gls)
2015–2018	Hofstra Pride	72	(4)

Senior career*
Years	Team	Apps	(Gls)
2018	Westchester Flames	5	(0)
2019–2025	New York Red Bulls	160	(3)
2019	New York Red Bulls II	20	(3)
2026–	D.C. United	0	(0)
- * Club domestic league appearances and goals as of October 24, 2025

Sean Nealis (born January 13, 1997) is an American professional soccer player who plays as a defender for Major League Soccer club D.C. United.

== Career ==
=== Youth and college ===
Born in Massapequa, New York, Nealis began playing soccer at the age of seven. In his junior year of high school, he led the Massapequa Chiefs to a NYSPHSAA Class AA Championship. Nealis attended Hofstra University, where he was a member of the varsity soccer team for four years. During his senior season he was recognized as the Colonial Athletic Association Defensive Player of the Year. In 2018, Nealis played five games in the PDL with Westchester Flames.

He is the younger brother of former Georgetown Hoyas, Long Island Rough Riders and New York Cosmos defender, Jimmy Nealis. His older brother, Connor, played for Binghamton University. Nealis' younger brother, Dylan, was a member of the Georgetown Men's Soccer National Championship Team in 2019 and was drafted third overall by Inter Miami in the 2020 MLS SuperDraft. Dylan later joined his brother as a Red Bull in 2021.

=== New York Red Bulls ===
On January 11, 2019, Nealis was drafted in the second round of the 2019 MLS SuperDraft, by the New York Red Bulls. After a strong preseason with the club, Nealis signed an MLS contract on February 17. On February 27, 2019, Nealis made his professional and New York Red Bulls debut coming on in the second half for Aaron Long in 3–0 victory over Atlético Pantoja in the 2019 CONCACAF Champions League. A few days later, on March 2, 2019, Nealis made his league debut with the club, appearing in a 1–1 draw with Columbus Crew. On May 11, 2019, Nealis scored his first goal for the club in a 3–1 victory over FC Dallas.

Nealis became a regular starter for New York during the 2021 season. On August 25, 2021, he signed a three-year contract extension, with an additional option year. On October 23, 2021, Nealis scored the winning goal for New York in a 2–1 victory over Columbus Crew.

Toward the end of the 2022 season, New York once again handed Nealis a contract extension through the 2026 season with an option for 2027. Nealis was named team captain for New York for the 2023 season. On September 23, 2023, Nealis scored his first goal of the season, the go ahead goal in a 5–3 victory over D.C. United.

Nealis scored the only Red Bull goal in a 2–1 loss to the LA Galaxy in MLS Cup 2024. On May 7, 2025, Nealis scored his first goal of the season for New York in a 4–1 victory over Colorado Springs Switchbacks FC, helping his club advance in the U.S. Open Cup.

=== D.C. United ===
On 22 December 2025, D.C. United acquired Nealis from New York Red Bulls in exchange for $350,000 in General Allocation Money (GAM) ahead of the 2026 season.

== Career statistics ==
As of match played October 18, 2025

Appearances and goals by club, season and competition
Club	Season	League			U.S. Open Cup		Continental		Other		Total	
Club	Season	Division	Apps	Goals	Apps	Goals	Apps	Goals	Apps	Goals	Apps	Goals
Westchester Flames	2018	Premier Development League	5	0	—		—		—		5	0
New York Red Bulls	2019	Major League Soccer	9	1	0	0	1 (Note: Appearance in CONCACAF Champions League)	0	0	0	10	1
New York Red Bulls	2020	Major League Soccer	6	0	—		—		0	0	6	0
New York Red Bulls	2021	Major League Soccer	28	1	—		—		1 (Note: Appearance(s) in MLS Cup playoffs)	0	29	1
New York Red Bulls	2022	Major League Soccer	33	0	5	0	—		1	0	39	0
New York Red Bulls	2023	Major League Soccer	31	1	1	0	—		7 (Note: Three appearances in MLS Cup playoffs, four appearances in Leagues Cup)	0	39	1
New York Red Bulls	2024	Major League Soccer	28	0	—		—		7 (Note: Five appearances in MLS Cup playoffs, two appearances in Leagues Cup)	1	35	1
New York Red Bulls	2025	Major League Soccer	25	0	3	1	—		1 (Note: Appearance in Leagues Cup)	0	29	1
New York Red Bulls	Total		160	3	9	1	1	0	17	1	187	5
New York Red Bulls II (loan)	2019	USL Championship	20	3	—		—		1 (Note: Appearance in USL Championship playoffs)	0	21	3
Career total			185	6	9	1	1	0	18	1	213	8
