= Elias Manoel =

Brazilian footballer (born 2001)

Elias
Personal information
- Full name: Elias Manoel Alves de Paula
- Date of birth: 30 November 2001 (age 24)
- Place of birth: Campinas, Brazil
- Height: 1.76 m (5 ft 9 in)
- Positions: Left winger; forward

Team information
- Current team: Tijuana
- Number: 13

Youth career
- Guarani
- 2016–2021: Grêmio

Senior career*
| Years | Team | Apps | (Gls) |
| 2021–2023 | Grêmio | 36 | (7) |
| 2022 | → New York Red Bulls (loan) | 6 | (2) |
| 2023–2024 | New York Red Bulls | 61 | (11) |
| 2023 | New York Red Bulls II | 1 | (1) |
| 2025 | Real Salt Lake | 0 | (0) |
| 2025–2026 | Botafogo | 2 | (0) |
| 2025–2026 | → Santa Clara (loan) | 15 | (3) |
| 2026– | Tijuana | 3 | (3) |
- * Club domestic league appearances and goals as of 21 October 2026

Elias Manoel Alves de Paula (born 30 November 2001), commonly known as Elias Manoel or Elias, is a Brazilian professional footballer who plays as left-winger or forward for Liga MX club Tijuana.

== Club career ==
=== Gremio ===
Born in Campinas, Brazil, Elias began his career in the youth ranks of Guarani. He joined Grêmio's Academy at the age of 16 in 2018. He made his first team debut on 30 March 2021, appearing as a starter in a 2-2 draw with Esporte Clube São Luiz on matchday 8 of the Campeonato Gaúcho. On 19 May 2021, Elias helped Gremio to a 6-2 victory over Venezuelan side Aragua F.C., scoring his first two goals with the club in a 2021 Copa Sudamericana match.

On 26 January 2022, Elias scored two goals in a 2-1 victory over Caxias on matchday 1 of the 2022 Campeonato Gaúcho. A few days later, on 29 January he scored from the penalty spot in a 1-1 draw with Grêmio Esportivo Brasil. On 19 March 2022, Elias opened the scoring for Gremio in a 3-0 victory over Internacional in the opening leg of the Campeonato Gaúcho semi-finals. On 27 April 2022, Elias scored his first goal in Série B, the loan goal in a 1-0 victory over Operário. A few days later, on 30 April 2022, Elias opened the scoring for Gremio in a 2-0 victory over Clube de Regatas Brasil.

Elias was the top goalscorer during the 2022 Campeonato Gaúcho, scoring 5 goals in 11 matches to help lead Gremio to the title. The young Brazilian ended the 2022 season as Grêmio's second leading scorer behind former Brazilian international Diego Souza, scoring 7 goals in 30 matches.

==== Loan to New York Red Bulls ====
During August 2022 Elias was loaned to New York Red Bulls until December 2022, with a purchase option included in the contract. On 31 August 2022, Elias made his debut for New York, appearing as a starter in a 1-0 victory versus CF Montréal. On 9 October 2022, Elias scored his first two goals for New York in a 2-0 victory over Charlotte FC.

=== New York Red Bulls ===
Following his loan with the Red Bulls, the club announced on 6 January 2023 that Elias had signed on a permanent deal. On 25 March 2023, Elias scored his first goal of the season for New York in a 1-1 draw at Charlotte FC. On 8 August 2023, Elias scored his first goal in Leagues Cup in a 1-1 draw with Philadelphia Union, a match his club would lose on penalties. On 4 October 2023, Elias scored the winning goal for New York in a 2-1 victory over FC Cincinnati which kept New York in the playoff race. On 25 October 2023, Elias recorded a hat trick for New York in a 5-2 victory over Charlotte FC, helping his club advance to the first round of the 2023 MLS Cup Playoffs.

On 2 March 2024, Elias scored the first goal of the season for New York in a 2-1 victory over Houston Dynamo. On 11 May 2024, Elias recorded a goal and an assist in a 4-2 victory over New England Revolution. A few days later, on 15 May, Elias opened the scoring for New York, chipping the goalkeeper from 30-yards out, in a 4-1 victory over Atlantic Cup rivals D.C. United. On 30 July 2024, Elias scored for New York in a 1-1 draw with Pachuca in a Leagues Cup match.

On 20 December 2024, Elias was traded to Real Salt Lake along with the Red Bull's three 2025 MLS SuperDraft picks and their second round 2026 SuperDraft pick, in exchange for $550,000 in GAM for 2025, $150,000 in GAM for 2026, and percentage of sell-on rights. Elias was displeased with the concept of being traded to Real Salt Lake without his knowledge and refused to report to camp, leading to a transfer out of the league being negotiated.

=== Botafogo ===
==== Loan to Santa Clara ====
On 26 July 2025, Botafogo loaned Elias to Portuguese team Santa Clara until June 2026.

== Career statistics ==
=== Club ===
As of 11 May 2026

Appearances and goals by club, season and competition
| Club | Season | League | | | State League | | National cup | | Continental | | Other | | Total | |
| Club | Season | Division | Apps | Goals | Apps | Goals | Apps | Goals | Apps | Goals | Apps | Goals | Apps | Goals |
|---|---|---|---|---|---|---|---|---|---|---|---|---|---|---|
| Grêmio | 2021 | Série A | 5 | 0 | 2 (Note: Appearance(s) in Campeonato Gaúcho.) | 0 | 0 | 0 | 2 | 2 | — | | 9 | 2 |
| Grêmio | 2022 | Série B | 18 | 2 | 11 | 5 | 1 | 0 | — | | — | | 30 | 7 |
| Grêmio | Total | | 23 | 2 | 13 | 5 | 1 | 0 | 2 | 2 | — | | 39 | 9 |
| New York Red Bulls (loan) | 2022 | Major League Soccer | 6 | 2 | — | | — | | — | | 1 (Note: Appearance(s) in MLS Cup Playoffs.) | 0 | 7 | 2 |
| New York Red Bulls | 2023 | Major League Soccer | 28 | 3 | — | | 2 | 0 | 4 (Note: Appearance(s) in Leagues Cup.) | 1 | 3 | 3 | 37 | 7 |
| New York Red Bulls | 2024 | Major League Soccer | 33 | 8 | — | | 0 | 0 | 2 | 1 | 5 | 0 | 40 | 9 |
| New York Red Bulls | Total | | 67 | 13 | — | | 2 | 0 | 6 | 2 | 9 | 3 | 84 | 18 |
| Botafogo | 2025 | Série A | 2 | 0 | — | | 1 | 0 | 3 (Note: Appearance(s) in Copa Libertadores) | 0 | — | | 6 | 0 |
| Santa Clara (loan) | 2025–26 | Primeira Liga | 14 | 2 | — | | 1 | 0 | 2 (Note: Appearance(s) in UEFA Conference League) | 0 | — | | 17 | 2 |
| Career total | | | 106 | 17 | 13 | 5 | 5 | 0 | 13 | 4 | 9 | 3 | 146 | 29 |

== Honours ==
Grêmio

- Campeonato Gaúcho: 2021, 2022
- Recopa Gaúcha: 2021, 2022
- Campeonato Brasileiro Sub-23: 2021
