= 2023 New York Red Bulls season =

New York Red Bulls
2023 season
- General Manager: Marc de Grandpré
- Head coach: Gerhard Struber (until May 8); Troy Lesesne (from May 8)
- Stadium: Red Bull Arena
- Major League Soccer: Conference: 8th Overall: 17th
- MLS Cup playoffs: Round one
- U.S. Open Cup: Round of 16
- Leagues Cup: Round of 16
- Top goalscorer: League: Omir Fernandez (6); All: Omir Fernandez (8)
- Highest home attendance: 23,121 vs New York City FC (May 13, 2023)
- Lowest home attendance: 2,396 vs D.C. United (May 9, 2023)
- Average home league attendance: 17,786
- Biggest win: RBNY 4–0 ATL
- Biggest defeat: RBNY 0–3 ORL
Home colors	Away colors

The 2023 New York Red Bulls season was the club's twenty-eighth season in Major League Soccer, the top division of soccer in the United States.

== Summary ==
During a match against the San Jose Earthquakes on April 8, forward Dante Vanzeir was accused of using a racial slur. The match was halted in the second half and later resumed, with 21 minutes of stoppage time added on. Vanzeir later announced that he would "step away from the club until further notice"; on April 13, MLS announced a six-match suspension from all competitions and a fine for Vanzeir's use of racist language. The suspension was faced with heavy scrutiny with the club's supporters claiming that the punishment was inadequate under the MLS's "Zero Tolerance" policy on racism. This had caused the supporters groups to lead a walk-out during a match against Houston Dynamo FC on April 15 in protest to the suspension.

On May 8, Gerhard Struber mutually parted ways with the New York Red Bulls. Assistant Coach Bernd Eibler also left the club. Struber was replaced by Troy Lesesne, who was also the assistant coach of the club before becoming the interim head coach.

The Red Bulls successfully qualified for the MLS Cup Playoffs on October 21 for an MLS-record 14th straight season after left-back John Tolkin converted a stoppage time penalty in a match against Nashville SC.

== Team information ==
=== Squad information ===
As of October 25, 2023

Appearances and goals are career totals from all-competitions.

Squad No.	Name	Nationality	Position(s)	Date of birth (age)	Signed from	Games played	Goals scored
Goalkeepers
1	Carlos Coronel	(Paraguay)	GK	December 29, 1996 (age 29)	(Austria) Red Bull Salzburg	111	0
18	Ryan Meara	(United States)	GK	November 15, 1990 (age 35)	(United States) Fordham University	59	0
40	AJ Marcucci	(United States)	GK	August 31, 1999 (age 26)	(United States) New York Red Bulls II	0	0
Defenders
2	Jayden Reid	(United States)	LB/RB	August 30, 2001 (age 24)	Academy	1	0
3	Matt Nocita	(United States)	CB	April 24, 2000 (age 25)	United States Naval Academy	2	0
4	Andrés Reyes	(Colombia)	CB	August 9, 1999 (age 26)	(Colombia) Atlético Nacional	66	4
6	Kyle Duncan	(United States)	RB	August 8, 1997 (age 28)	(Belgium) Oostende (on loan)	114	5
12	Dylan Nealis	(United States)	RB	July 30, 1998 (age 27)	(United States) Nashville SC	55	1
15	Sean Nealis	(United States)	CB	January 13, 1997 (age 29)	(United States) Hofstra University	118	2
24	Curtis Ofori	(United States)	LB	November 20, 2005 (age 20)	Academy	0	0
47	John Tolkin	(United States)	LB	July 31, 2002 (age 23)	Academy	98	7
78	O'Vonte Mullings	(Canada)	LB/RB	October 9, 2000 (age 25)	(United States) New York Red Bulls II	3	0
98	Hassan Ndam	(Cameroon)	CB	October 29, 1998 (age 27)	(United States) New York Red Bulls II	23	0
	Juan José Mina	(Colombia)	RB	July 27, 2004 (age 21)	(Colombia) Deportivo Cali	0	0
Midfielders
5	Peter Stroud	(United States)	CM	April 23, 2002 (age 23)	Academy	29	0
8	Frankie Amaya	(United States)	CM	September 26, 2000 (age 25)	(United States) FC Cincinnati	80	7
10	Lewis Morgan	(Scotland)	RW/LW	September 30, 1996 (age 29)	(United States) Inter Miami CF	43	18
16	Dru Yearwood	(England)	CM	February 17, 2000 (age 26)	(England) Brentford	95	3
17	Cameron Harper	(United States)	RW/LW	November 19, 2001 (age 24)	(Scotland) Celtic	63	3
19	Wikelman Carmona	(Venezuela)	CM	February 24, 2003 (age 23)	(Venezuela) Academia Dynamo FC	45	2
21	Omir Fernandez	(United States)	RW/LW	February 8, 1999 (age 27)	Academy	126	17
22	Serge Ngoma	(United States)	CM	July 9, 2005 (age 20)	Academy	6	2
31	Ibrahim Kasule	(Uganda)	CM	February 17, 2004 (age 22)	(United States) New York Red Bulls II	1	0
48	Ronald Donkor	(Mali)	CM	November 20, 2004 (age 21)	(Mali) Guidars FC	5	0
65	Steven Sserwadda	(Uganda)	CM	August 28, 2002 (age 23)	(United States) New York Red Bulls II	3	0
75	Daniel Edelman	(United States)	CM	April 28, 2003 (age 22)	Academy	47	2
77	Amos Shapiro-Thompson	(United States)	CM	January 11, 2000 (age 26)	(United States) New York Red Bulls II	1	0
82	Luquinhas	(Brazil)	RW/LW	September 28, 1996 (age 29)	(Poland) Legia Warsaw	67	10
91	Bento Estrela	(Portugal)	CM	February 10, 2006 (age 20)	Academy	0	0
Forwards
7	Cory Burke	(Jamaica)	FW	December 28, 1991 (age 34)	(United States) Philadelphia Union	24	2
9	Jorge Cabezas Hurtado	(Colombia)	FW	September 6, 2003 (age 22)	(England) Watford (on loan)	5	0
11	Elias Manoel	(Brazil)	FW	November 30, 2001 (age 24)	(Brazil) Grêmio	40	9
13	Dante Vanzeir	(Belgium)	FW	April 16, 1998 (age 27)	(Belgium) Union SG	24	5
74	Tom Barlow	(United States)	FW	July 8, 1995 (age 30)	(United States) New York Red Bulls II	136	18

== Roster transactions ==
=== In ===
#	Pos.	Player	Signed from	Details	Date	Source
7	FW	(Jamaica) Cory Burke	(United States) Philadelphia Union	Free transfer	November 21, 2022	
24	DF	(United States) Curtis Ofori	Academy	Homegrown Player	December 1, 2022	
2	DF	(United States) Jayden Reid	Academy	Homegrown Player	December 21, 2022	
11	FW	(Brazil) Elias Manoel	(Brazil) Gremio	Undisclosed transfer	January 6, 2023	
6	DF	(United States) Kyle Duncan	(Belgium) Oostende	Loan until December 2023	January 15, 2023	
13	FW	(Belgium) Dante Vanzeir	(Belgium) Union SG	$5,500,000	February 3, 2023	
48	MF	(Mali) Ronald Donkor	(Mali) Guidars FC	Undisclosed transfer	May 3, 2023	
	DF	(Colombia) Juan José Mina	(Colombia) Deportivo Cali	Undisclosed transfer	July 31, 2023	

=== Out ===
#	Pos.	Player	Signed by	Details	Date	Source
30	MF	(Venezuela) Jesús Castellano	(United States) FC Cincinnati 2	Option declined	October 27, 2022	
28	FW	(United States) Zach Ryan	(United States) Loudoun United FC	Option declined	October 27, 2022	
67	FW	(The Gambia) Omar Sowe	(Iceland) Leiknir Reykjavík	Option declined	October 27, 2022	
33	DF	(United States) Aaron Long	(United States) Los Angeles FC	End of contract	October 27, 2022	
6	DF	(United States) Kyle Duncan	(Belgium) Oostende	End of loan	October 27, 2022	
37	MF	(United States) Caden Clark	(Germany) RB Leipzig	End of loan	October 27, 2022	
11	FW	(Brazil) Elias Manoel	(Brazil) Grêmio	End of loan	October 27, 2022	
9	FW	(Poland) Patryk Klimala	(Israel) Hapoel Be'er Sheva	Undisclosed transfer	January 29, 2023	
23	MF	(Venezuela) Cristian Cásseres	(France) Toulouse	Undisclosed transfer	July 7, 2023	

== Preseason and friendlies ==
January 21 Preseason	Nashville SC	0–1	New York Red Bulls	Bradenton, Florida
		Report	Cásseres 1st half'	Stadium: IMG Academy

January 28 Preseason	New York Red Bulls	2–1	United States U20	Bradenton, Florida
	Luquinhas 1st half' Manoel 2nd half'	Report	Sullivan 1st half'	Stadium: IMG Academy

February 11 Coachella Valley Invitational	New York Red Bulls	1–0	Minnesota United FC	Indio, California
	Luquinhas			Stadium: Empire Polo Club

February 15 Coachella Valley Invitational	LA Galaxy	v	New York Red Bulls	Indio, California
				Stadium: Empire Polo Club

February 18 Coachella Valley Invitational	San Jose Earthquakes	v	New York Red Bulls	Indio, California
				Stadium: Empire Polo Club

== Major League Soccer season ==
=== Eastern Conference ===
MLS Eastern Conference table (2023)
Pos	Team	Pld	W	L	T	GF	GA	GD	Pts	Qualification
1	FC Cincinnati	34	20	5	9	57	39	+18	69	MLS Cup Round One
2	Orlando City SC	34	18	7	9	55	39	+16	63	MLS Cup Round One
3	Columbus Crew	34	16	9	9	67	46	+21	57	MLS Cup Round One
4	Philadelphia Union	34	15	9	10	57	41	+16	55	MLS Cup Round One
5	New England Revolution	34	15	9	10	58	46	+12	55	MLS Cup Round One
6	Atlanta United FC	34	13	9	12	66	53	+13	51	MLS Cup Round One
7	Nashville SC	34	13	11	10	39	32	+7	49	MLS Cup Round One
8	New York Red Bulls	34	11	13	10	36	39	−3	43	MLS Cup Wild Card
9	Charlotte FC	34	10	11	13	45	52	−7	43	MLS Cup Wild Card
10	CF Montréal	34	12	17	5	36	52	−16	41	
11	New York City FC	34	9	11	14	35	39	−4	41	
12	D.C. United	34	10	14	10	45	49	−4	40	
13	Chicago Fire FC	34	10	14	10	39	51	−12	40	
14	Inter Miami CF	34	9	18	7	41	54	−13	34	
15	Toronto FC	34	4	20	10	26	59	−33	22	

Source: MLS
Rules for classification: 1) points; 2) total wins; 3) total goal differential; 4) total goals scored; 5) fewer disciplinary points; 6) away goal differential; 7) away goals scored; 8) home goals differential; 9) home goals scored; 10) coin toss (2 clubs tied) or drawing of lots (≥3 clubs tied)

=== Overall ===
Overall MLS standings table
Pos	Team	Pld	W	L	T	GF	GA	GD	Pts
15	Sporting Kansas City	34	12	14	8	48	51	−3	44
16	San Jose Earthquakes	34	10	10	14	39	43	−4	44
17	New York Red Bulls	34	11	13	10	36	39	−3	43
18	Portland Timbers	34	11	13	10	46	58	−12	43
19	Charlotte FC	34	10	11	13	45	52	−7	43

Source: MLS
Rules for classification: 1) points; 2) total wins; 3) total goal differential; 4) total goals scored; 5) fewer disciplinary points; 6) away goal differential; 7) away goals scored; 8) home goals differential; 9) home goals scored; 10) coin toss (2 clubs tied) or drawing of lots (≥3 clubs tied)

=== Results summary ===
Overall								Home						Away					
Pld	W	D	L	GF	GA	GD	Pts	W	D	L	GF	GA	GD	W	D	L	GF	GA	GD
34	11	13	10	36	39	−3	46	7	5	5	21	17	+4	4	8	5	15	22	−7

=== Matches ===
February 25 1	Orlando City SC	1–0	New York Red Bulls	Orlando, Florida
7:30PM	Jansson (yellow card) 23'; Torres 56' (pen.); Angulo (yellow card) 76'; Pereyra (yellow card) 77'; Araújo (yellow card) 83'	Report	Reyes (yellow card) 6'; Barlow (yellow card) 49'; Amaya (yellow card) 72'	Stadium: Exploria Stadium; Attendance: 24,088; Referee: Guido Gonzales Jr.

March 4 2	New York Red Bulls	0–0	Nashville SC	Harrison, New Jersey
7:30PM		Report	McCarty (yellow card) 3'; Anunga (yellow card) 52'; Zimmerman (yellow card) 85'; Washington (yellow card) 90+3'	Stadium: Red Bull Arena; Attendance: 18,474; Referee: Pierre-Luc Lauziere

March 11 3	Minnesota United FC	1–1	New York Red Bulls	St. Paul, Minnesota
8:30PM	Hlongwane 18'; Arriaga (yellow card) 76'	Report	Nealis (yellow card) 36'; Reyes 49'; Cásseres (yellow card) 68'; Duncan (yellow card) 87'	Stadium: Allianz Field; Attendance: 19,614; Referee: Chris Penso

March 18 4	New York Red Bulls	2–1	Columbus Crew	Harrison, New Jersey
7:30PM	Cásseres (yellow card) 53'; Luquinhas 58'; Burke (yellow card) 63'; Vanzeir 86'	Report	Mățan 33'; Moreira (yellow card) 45+3'; Russell-Rowe (yellow card) 83'; Medranda (yellow card) 86'	Stadium: Red Bull Arena; Attendance: 15,412; Referee: Timothy Ford

March 25 5	Charlotte FC	1–1	New York Red Bulls	Charlotte, North Carolina
7:30PM	Santos (yellow card) 36'; Copetti (yellow card) 62'; Jones (yellow card) 64'; Reyes 74' (o.g.)	Report	Manoel 43' (yellow card) 56'; D. Nealis (yellow card) 45+3'; Tolkin (yellow card) 63'; Duncan (yellow card) 80'	Stadium: Bank of America Stadium; Attendance: 32,540; Referee: Marcos de Oliveira

April 1 6	Atlanta United FC	1–0	New York Red Bulls	Atlanta
7:30PM	Giakoumakis 8' (yellow card) 55'; Araújo (yellow card) 34'; Robinson (yellow card) 45+4'; Rossetto (yellow card) 90+2'	Report	Burke (yellow card) 9'; Duncan (yellow card) 42'; Cásseres (yellow card) 45+1'; Reyes (yellow card) 45+6'; S. Nealis (yellow card) 55'; Harper (yellow card) 90+5'	Stadium: Mercedes-Benz Stadium; Attendance: 43,511; Referee: Alex Chilowicz

April 8 7	New York Red Bulls	1–1	San Jose Earthquakes	Harrison, New Jersey
7:30PM	Fernandez (yellow card) 11'; S.Nealis (yellow card) 54'; Barlow 90+17'	Report	Rodrigues (yellow card) 24'; Judson (yellow card) 56'; Espinoza 80'; Marie (yellow card) 90+13'	Stadium: Red Bull Arena; Attendance: 15,939; Referee: Ismir Pekmic

April 15 8	New York Red Bulls	1–1	Houston Dynamo	Harrison, New Jersey
7:30PM	Tolkin (yellow card) 14'; Duncan (yellow card) 66'; Fernandez 89'	Report	Escobar (yellow card) 25'; Carrasquilla 67'; Caicedo (yellow card) 82'	Stadium: Red Bull Arena; Attendance: 12,932; Referee: Ramy Touchan

April 22 9	CF Montréal	2–0	New York Red Bulls	Montreal
7:30PM	Reyes 25' (OG); Corbo (yellow card) 26'; Iliadis (yellow card) 53' (yellow-red card) 65'; Choinière (yellow card) 59' (goal) 90+2'	Report	Edelman (yellow card) 2'; Duncan (yellow card) 62'; Reyes (yellow card) 71'	Stadium: Saputo Stadium; Attendance: 14,021; Referee: Rubiel Vazquez

April 29 10	Chicago Fire	1–1	New York Red Bulls	Chicago
9:30 PM	(yellow card) 4' Czichos; 34' Kamara; (yellow card) 45+1' Pineda; (yellow card) 47' M. Navarro; (yellow card) 50' Mueller; (yellow card) 82' Dean	Report	(yellow card) 12' Cásseres; (yellow card) 38' Fernandez; 89' Burke	Stadium: Soldier Field; Attendance: 11,432; Referee: Chris Penso

May 6 11	New York Red Bulls	0–1	Philadelphia Union	Harrison, New Jersey
7:30PM	Reyes (yellow card) 25'; Burke (yellow card) 68'	Report	Gazdag 31' (pen.); Flach (yellow card) 36'; Sullivan (yellow card) 45+7'	Stadium: Red Bull Arena; Attendance: 18,712; Referee: Joseph Dickerson

May 13 12	New York Red Bulls	1–0	New York City FC	Harrison, New Jersey
7:30PM	Reyes (yellow card) 67'; Nealis (yellow card) 72'; Fernandez 76'; Cásseres Jr. (yellow card) 88'	Report	Parks (yellow card) 37'	Stadium: Red Bull Arena; Attendance: 23,121; Referee: Ted Unkel

May 17 13	Toronto FC	0–0	New York Red Bulls	Toronto
7:30PM		Report	Manoel (yellow card) 45'; Stroud (yellow card) 75'; Barlow (yellow card) 89'	Stadium: BMO Field; Attendance: 22,560; Referee: Guido Gonzales Jr.

May 20 14	New York Red Bulls	2–1	CF Montréal	Harrison, New Jersey
7:30PM	Reyes 23'; Burke 38'; Cásseres (yellow card) 45+1'	Report	Camacho (yellow card) 16'; Waterman 29'; Duke (yellow card) 32'; Herrera (yellow card) 65'	Stadium: Red Bull Arena; Attendance: 13,436; Referee: Drew Fischer

May 27 15	Seattle Sounders FC	1–0	New York Red Bulls	Seattle, Washington
10:30PM	Morris 22'; João Paulo (yellow card) 45+1' (yellow-red card) 75'; Baker (yellow card) 55'; Ragen (yellow card) 83'	Report	Barlow (yellow card) 9'; Yearwood (yellow card) 27'; Ndam (yellow card) 90+2'	Stadium: Lumen Field; Attendance: 31,032; Referee: Jon Freemon

May 31 16	Inter Miami CF	0–1	New York Red Bulls	Fort Lauderdale, Florida
7:30PM	Miller (yellow card) 70'	Report	Duncan (yellow card) 9'; Barlow 52'; Harper (yellow card) 61' (yellow-red card) 90+4'; Reyes (yellow card) 70'	Stadium: DRV PNK Stadium; Attendance: 15,136; Referee: Pierre-Luc Lauziere

June 3 17	New York Red Bulls	0–3	Orlando City SC	Harrison, New Jersey
7:30PM	Yearwood (yellow card) 30'; Reyes (yellow card) 45+3' (yellow-red card) 47'; Nealis (yellow card) 50'	Report	Angulo 18'; Jansson (yellow card) 45+6'; Torres 52' (pen.), 72'; Rafael Santos (yellow card) 90'; Felipe Martins (yellow card) 90+6'	Stadium: Red Bull Arena; Attendance: 19,871; Referee: Victor Rivas

June 21 18	New York Red Bulls	2–2	Charlotte FC	Harrison, New Jersey
7:30PM	Nealis (yellow card) 11'; Harper (yellow card) 26', (goal) 58'; Coronel (yellow card) 45+3'; Vanzeir 53', (yellow card) 88'	Report	Bender 13', 19'; Corujo (yellow card) 42'; Lindsey (yellow card) 55'; Bronico (yellow card) 84'; Byrne (yellow card) 89'; Gaines II (yellow card) 90+5'	Stadium: Red Bull Arena; Attendance: 12,178; Referee: Sergii Boiko

June 24 19	New York Red Bulls	4–0	Atlanta United FC	Harrison, New Jersey
7:30PM	Edelman 32', (yellow card) 54'; Cásseres Jr. (yellow card) 37', (goal) 45'; Amaya 78', 90'	Report	Gutman (yellow card) 27'; Chol (yellow card) 82'	Stadium: Red Bull Arena; Attendance: 16,277; Referee: Rosendo Mendoza

July 1 20	Columbus Crew	2–1	New York Red Bulls	Columbus, Ohio
7:30PM	Hernández 19'; Yeboah 62'; Schulte (yellow card) 63'; Zawadzki (yellow card) 72'	Report	Edelman (yellow card) 33'; Elias Manoel 38'; Amaya (yellow card) 82'; Coronel (yellow card) 90+5'	Stadium: Lower.com Field; Attendance: 20,415; Referee: Ismir Pekmic

July 8 21	New York Red Bulls	2–1	New England Revolution	Harrison, New Jersey
7:30PM	Amaya 58'; Reyes (yellow card) 74'; Harper (yellow card) 75'; Duncan (yellow card) 82'; Carmona 85'	Report	Wood (yellow card) 6'; Blessing (red card) 60'; Bye 76'	Stadium: Red Bull Arena; Attendance: 20,014; Referee: Rubiel Vazquez

July 12 22	New York Red Bulls	1–2	FC Cincinnati	Harrison, New Jersey
7:30PM	Ndam (yellow card) 3'; Fernandez 28' (pen.); Edelman (yellow card) 45+1'; Vanzeir (yellow card) 64'	Report	Pinto (yellow card) 19'; Santos (yellow card) 62'; Ordóñez (yellow card) 71'; Acosta 80' (pen.); Nwobodo 90+3'	Stadium: Red Bull Arena; Attendance: 13,439; Referee: Lukasz Szpala

July 15 23	Real Salt Lake	3–1	New York Red Bulls	Sandy, Utah
9:30PM	Luna 2', 53'; Savarino 81'; Brody (yellow card) 83'; Vera (yellow card) 84'; Julio (yellow card) 90'	Report	Tolkin (yellow card) 55'; Amaya 80'	Stadium: America First Field; Attendance: 20,556; Referee: Alexis Da Silva

August 20 24	New York Red Bulls	1–0	D.C. United	Harrison, New Jersey
7:30PM	Yearwood (yellow card) 44'; Reyes (yellow card) 78'; Duncan (yellow card) 82'; Tolkin 88'	Report	Durkin (yellow card) 36'; Williams (yellow card) 54'	Stadium: Red Bull Arena; Attendance: 17,872; Referee: Jon Freemon

August 26 25	New York Red Bulls	0–2	Inter Miami CF	Harrison, New Jersey
7:30PM	Harper (yellow card) 11'; Coronel (yellow card) 87'	Report	Avilés (yellow card) 20'; Gómez 37'; Messi 89'	Stadium: Red Bull Arena; Attendance: 26,276; Referee: Allen Chapman

August 30 26	New England Revolution	1–0	New York Red Bulls	Foxborough, Massachusetts
7:30PM	Vrioni 30'; Gil (yellow card) 39'; Polster (yellow card) 74'	Report	Amaya (yellow card) 67'	Stadium: Gillette Stadium; Attendance: 16,444; Referee: Malik Badawi

September 3 27	Philadelphia Union	4–1	New York Red Bulls	Chester, Pennsylvania
7:30PM	Glesnes 29'; Lowe (yellow card) 37', (goal) 57'; McGlynn (yellow card) 45+5'; Carranza 58'; Gazdag 76'; Bedoya (yellow card) 80'; Baribo (yellow card) 85'	Report	Nealis (yellow card) 6' (yellow-red card) 44'; Fernandez 11'; Reyes (yellow card) 24'	Stadium: Subaru Park; Attendance: 19,361; Referee: Rubiel Vazquez

September 16 28	New York City FC	0–0	New York Red Bulls	New York, New York
3:30PM	Pellegrini (yellow card) 42'; Morales (yellow card) 63'; Sands (yellow card) 90+3'	Report	Barlow (yellow card) 48'; Ndam (yellow card) 69'; Harper (yellow card) 90+7'	Stadium: Yankee Stadium; Attendance: 29,657; Referee: Joseph Dickerson

September 20 29	New York Red Bulls	1–1	Austin FC	Harrison, New Jersey
7:30PM	Rigoni 7' (o.g.); Edelman (yellow card) 8'; Yearwood (yellow card) 61'	Report	Driussi 44'; Urruti (yellow card) 82'; Lima (yellow card) 84'	Stadium: Red Bull Arena; Attendance: 13,562; Referee: Nima Saghafi

September 23 30	D.C. United	3–5	New York Red Bulls	Washington, D.C.
7:30PM	Benteke 21', 36', 45+2' (pen.), (yellow card) 83'; Canouse (yellow card) 25'; Hines-Ike (yellow card) 55'	Report	Fernandez 17', 44' (pen.); Harper 45+5'; Nealis 58', (yellow card) 66'; Duncan (yellow card) 64'; Tolkin 90+3'	Stadium: Audi Field; Attendance: 12,591; Referee: Alex Chilowicz

September 30 31	New York Red Bulls	0–1	Chicago Fire FC	Harrison, New Jersey
7:30PM	Ndam (yellow card) 49' (yellow-red card) 62'; Tolkin (yellow card) 90+3'	Report	Doumbia (yellow card) 17'; Koutsias (yellow card) 59', (goal) 64'; Brady (yellow card) 82'; Dean (yellow card) 90+5'	Stadium: Red Bull Arena; Attendance: 20,347; Referee: Filip Dujic

October 4 32	FC Cincinnati	1–2	New York Red Bulls	Cincinnati
7:30PM	Gaddis (yellow card) 27'; Powell (yellow card) 49' (yellow-red card) 88'; Acosta 68' (pen.), (yellow card) 90+10'; Hagglund (yellow card) 73'; Pinto (yellow card) 82'; Barreal (yellow card) 90+8'	Report	Amaya 12'; Manoel 17'; Reyes (yellow card) 53'; Coronel (yellow card) 90+9'; Duncan (yellow card) 90+10'	Stadium: TQL Stadium; Attendance: 25,513; Referee: Chris Penso

October 7 33	New York Red Bulls	3–0	Toronto FC	Harrison, New Jersey
7:30PM	Barlow 45'; Luquinhas 48', 65'	Report		Stadium: Red Bull Arena; Attendance: 24,506; Referee: Ricardo Fierro

October 21 34	Nashville SC	0–1	New York Red Bulls	Nashville, Tennessee
6:00PM	Picault (yellow card) 45+3'	Report	Reyes (yellow card) 39'; Amaya (yellow card) 45+1'; Nealis (yellow card) 45+6'; Duncan (yellow card) 70'; Tolkin 90+4'	Stadium: Geodis Park; Attendance: 27,875; Referee: Lukasz Szpala

=== MLS Cup Playoffs ===
October 25 Wild Card	New York Red Bulls	5–2	Charlotte FC	Harrison, New Jersey
19:30 EDT	Manoel 10', 37', 78'; Tolkin 26'; Barlow 56'	Report	Malanda (yellow card) 25'; Copetti (yellow card) 33'; Vargas 49'; Agyemang 64'	Stadium: Red Bull Arena; Attendance: 16,074; Referee: Ismail Elfath

October 29 Round One	FC Cincinnati	3–0	New York Red Bulls	Cincinnati
20:00 EDT	Barreal 23', 89', (yellow card) 52'; Miazga (yellow card) 33'; Acosta 35'; Boupendza (yellow card) 74'	Report	Manoel (yellow card) 76'; Amaya (yellow card) 90'	Stadium: TQL Stadium; Attendance: 24,022; Referee: Rubiel Vazquez

November 4 Round One	New York Red Bulls	1–1 (7–8 p)	FC Cincinnati	Harrison, New Jersey
19:00 EDT	Barlow (yellow card) 41', (goal) 45'; Reyes (yellow card) 55'	Report	Arias (yellow card) 39'; Mosquera (yellow card) 75'; Boupendza 75'; Miazga (yellow card) 90+9' (yellow card) PSO	Stadium: Red Bull Arena; Attendance: 16,074; Referee: Victor Rivas
	Penalties
	Fernandez (penalty scored); Amaya (penalty scored); S. Nealis (penalty scored); Harper (penalty scored); Tolkin (penalty missed); D. Nealis (penalty scored); Manoel (penalty scored); Stroud (penalty scored); Ngoma (penalty missed); Reyes (penalty missed)		(penalty scored) Acosta; (penalty scored) Kubo; (penalty missed) Arias; (penalty scored) Vázquez; (penalty scored) Barreal; (penalty scored) Miazga; (penalty scored) Boupendza; (penalty scored) Santos; (penalty missed) Mosquera; (penalty scored) Moreno
Note: FC Cincinnati won series 2–0.

== U.S. Open Cup ==
May 9 Round of 32	New York Red Bulls (MLS) (New Jersey)	1–0	(Washington, D.C.) D.C. United (MLS)	Montclair, New Jersey
7:30 PM EDT	Fernandez 28'	Report	Hurtado (yellow card) 36'; Sargis (yellow card) 66'; Akinmboni (yellow card) 77'	Stadium: MSU Soccer Park; Attendance: 2,396; Referee: Marcos de Oliveira

May 22 Round of 16	New York Red Bulls (MLS) (New Jersey)	1–1 (a.e.t.) (3–5 p)	(Ohio) FC Cincinnati (MLS)	Harrison, New Jersey
7:30 EDT	Ndam (yellow card) 10'; Cásseres (yellow card) 22'; Nealis (yellow card) 28'; Tolkin (yellow card) 89'; Meara (yellow card) 89'; Vanzeir 90+2'; Carmona (yellow card) 99'	Report	42' Kubo; (yellow card) 69' Arias; (yellow card) 89' Badji; (yellow card) 90+2' Barreal	Stadium: Red Bull Arena; Attendance: 4,131; Referee: Fotis Bazakos
	Penalties
	Vanzeir (penalty missed); Manoel (penalty scored); Carmona (penalty scored); Cásseres (penalty scored)		(penalty scored) Acosta; (penalty scored) Moreno; (penalty scored) Badji; (penalty scored) Mosquera; (penalty scored) Barreal

== Leagues Cup ==
=== East 4 ===
Pos	Team	Pld	W	PW	PL	L	GF	GA	GD	Pts	Qualification	NYR	NER	ASL
1	(United States) New York Red Bulls	2	1	1	0	0	2	1	+1	5	Advance to knockout stage	—	0–0	2–1
2	(United States) New England Revolution	2	1	0	1	0	5	1	+4	4	Advance to knockout stage	—	—	—
3	(Mexico) Atlético San Luis	2	0	0	0	2	2	7	−5	0		—	1–5	—

Source: Leagues Cup
Rules for classification: Tiebreakers

July 22, 2023 Group Stage	New York Red Bulls (United States)	0–0 (4–2 p)	(United States) New England Revolution	Harrison, New Jersey
18:30 ET	Harper (yellow card) 47'	Report	Wood (yellow card) 26'	Stadium: Red Bull Arena; Attendance: 9,139; Referee: Pierre-Luc Lauziere
	Penalties
	Manoel (penalty missed); Edelman (penalty scored); Vanzeir (penalty scored); Nealis (penalty scored); Tolkin (penalty scored)		(penalty scored) Gil; (penalty scored) Bou; (penalty missed) Jones; (penalty missed) Vrioni

July 30, 2023 Group Stage	New York Red Bulls (United States)	2–1	(Mexico) Atlético San Luis	Harrison, New Jersey
19:30 ET	Amaya (yellow card) 35'; Vanzeir (yellow card) 36', (goal) 56', 90+2'; Tolkin (yellow card) 87'	Report	Dourado (yellow card) 17'; Villalpando (yellow card) 31'; Murillo 69', (yellow card) 73'	Stadium: Red Bull Arena; Attendance: 10,421; Referee: Iván López Sánchez

=== Knockout round ===
August 3, 2023 Round of 32	New York Red Bulls (United States)	1–0	(United States) New York City FC	Harrison, New Jersey
20:00 ET	Fernandez 31' (pen.), (yellow card) 59'; Amaya (yellow card) 34'; Reyes (yellow card) 48'; Tolkin (yellow card) 63'; Luquinhas (yellow card) 75'	Report	Gray (yellow card) 28'; Parks (yellow card) 59'; Rodríguez (yellow card) 78'	Stadium: Red Bull Arena; Attendance: 11,004; Referee: Daniel Quintero Huitrón

August 8, 2023 Round of 16	Philadelphia Union (United States)	1–1 (4–3 p)	(United States) New York Red Bulls	Chester, Pennsylvania
20:00 ET	Harriel 68'; Wagner (yellow card) 75'; Martínez (yellow card) 79'; Mbaizo (yellow card) 82'; Bueno (yellow card) 90+4'	Report	Manoel 4'; Amaya (yellow card) 79'	Stadium: Subaru Park; Attendance: 17,731; Referee: Víctor Alfonso Cáceres Hernández
	Penalties
	Elliott (penalty scored); Uhre (penalty scored); McGlynn (penalty missed); Carranza (penalty scored); Bueno (penalty scored)		(penalty missed) Morgan; (penalty scored) Amaya; (penalty missed) Edelman; (penalty scored) S. Nealis; (penalty scored) Tolkin
Note: Postponed from August 7 at 19:30 ET due to thunderstorm forecast in the area.

== Competitions summary ==
Competition	Record							
Competition	G	W	D	L	GF	GA	GD	Win %
MLS Regular Season	34	11	10	13	36	39	−3	32.35
MLS Cup Playoffs	1	1	0	0	5	2	+3	100.00
U.S. Open Cup	2	1	0	1	2	1	+1	50.00
Leagues Cup	4	2	2	0	4	2	+2	50.00
Total	41	15	12	14	47	44	+3	36.59

== Player statistics ==
As of October 25, 2023

No.	Pos	Nat	Player	Total		MLS		Playoffs		Open Cup		Leagues Cup	
No.	Pos	Nat	Player	Apps	Goals	Apps	Goals	Apps	Goals	Apps	Goals	Apps	Goals
Goalkeepers
1	GK	(Paraguay) PAR	Carlos Coronel	40	-43	34	-39	1	-2	0+1	0	4	-2
18	GK	(United States) USA	Ryan Meara	2	-1	0	0	0	0	2	-1	0	0
40	GK	(United States) USA	AJ Marcucci	0	0	0	0	0	0	0	0	0	0
Defenders
2	DF	(United States) USA	Jayden Reid	1	0	0+1	0	0	0	0	0	0	0
3	DF	(United States) USA	Matt Nocita	2	0	0+1	0	0	0	0+1	0	0	0
4	DF	(Colombia) COL	Andrés Reyes	34	2	28+1	2	1	0	1	0	2+1	0
6	DF	(United States) USA	Kyle Duncan	30	0	19+6	0	1	0	0	0	0+4	0
12	DF	(United States) USA	Dylan Nealis	22	0	10+9	0	0+1	0	1+1	0	0	0
15	DF	(United States) USA	Sean Nealis	37	1	31	1	1	0	1	0	4	0
24	DF	(United States) USA	Curtis Ofori	0	0	0	0	0	0	0	0	0	0
47	DF	(United States) USA	John Tolkin	34	4	27	3	1	1	2	0	4	0
88	DF	(Canada) CAN	O'Vonte Mullings	3	0	0+2	0	0	0	0+1	0	0	0
98	DF	(Cameroon) CMR	Hassan Ndam	19	0	8+7	0	0	0	2	0	2	0
Midfielders
5	MF	(United States) USA	Peter Stroud	31	0	10+15	0	0+1	0	2	0	0+3	0
8	MF	(United States) USA	Frankie Amaya	30	4	22+3	4	1	0	0	0	4	0
10	MF	(Scotland) SCO	Lewis Morgan	6	0	3+2	0	0	0	0	0	0+1	0
16	MF	(England) ENG	Dru Yearwood	27	0	11+9	0	0+1	0	2	0	0+4	0
17	MF	(United States) USA	Cameron Harper	39	2	25+7	2	0+1	0	2	0	4	0
19	MF	(Venezuela) VEN	Wikelman Carmona	19	1	5+11	1	0	0	0+2	0	0+1	0
21	MF	(United States) USA	Omir Fernandez	36	8	22+8	6	1	0	1	1	4	1
22	MF	(United States) USA	Serge Ngoma	0	0	0	0	0	0	0	0	0	0
31	MF	(Uganda) UGA	Ibrahim Kasule	1	0	0+1	0	0	0	0	0	0	0
48	MF	(Ghana) GHA	Ronald Donkor	5	0	0+3	0	0	0	0	0	0+2	0
65	MF	(Uganda) UGA	Steven Sserwadda	0	0	0	0	0	0	0	0	0	0
75	MF	(United States) USA	Daniel Edelman	29	1	22+1	1	1	0	1	0	4	0
77	MF	(United States) USA	Amos Shapiro-Thompson	1	0	0	0	0	0	0+1	0	0	0
82	MF	(Brazil) BRA	Luquinhas	32	3	23+3	3	1	0	0+1	0	4	0
91	MF	(Portugal) POR	Bento Estrela	0	0	0	0	0	0	0	0	0	0
Forwards
7	FW	(Jamaica) JAM	Cory Burke	25	2	11+12	2	0	0	0+2	0	0	0
9	FW	(Colombia) COL	Jorge Cabezas Hurtado	5	0	1+4	0	0	0	0	0	0	0
11	FW	(Brazil) BRA	Elias Manoel	35	6	20+8	2	1	3	0+2	0	1+3	1
13	FW	(Belgium) BEL	Dante Vanzeir	24	5	8+11	2	0	0	1	1	4	2
16	FW	(United States) USA	Julian Hall	1	0	0+1	0	0	0	0	0	0	0
74	FW	(United States) USA	Tom Barlow	41	4	20+14	3	1	1	2	0	4	0
Left Club During Season
23	MF	(Venezuela) VEN	Cristian Cásseres	19	1	16+1	1	0	0	2	0	0	0

=== Top scorers ===
Place	Position	Number	Name	MLS	Playoffs	Open Cup	Leagues Cup	Total
1	MF	21	(United States) Omir Fernandez	6	0	1	1	8
2	FW	11	(Brazil) Elias Manoel	3	3	0	1	7
3	MF	8	(United States) Frankie Amaya	5	0	0	0	5
3	FW	13	(Belgium) Dante Vanzeir	2	0	1	2	5
4	DF	47	(United States) John Tolkin	3	1	0	0	4
4	FW	74	(United States) Tom Barlow	3	1	0	0	4
5	MF	82	(Brazil) Luquinhas	3	0	0	0	3
6	DF	4	(Colombia) Andrés Reyes	2	0	0	0	2
6	FW	7	(Jamaica) Cory Burke	2	0	0	0	2
6	MF	17	(United States) Cameron Harper	2	0	0	0	2
7	MF	19	(Venezuela) Wikelman Carmona	1	0	0	0	1
7	DF	15	(United States) Sean Nealis	1	0	0	0	1
7	MF	23	(Venezuela) Cristian Cásseres	1	0	0	0	1
7	MF	75	(United States) Daniel Edelman	1	0	0	0	1
Own goals				1	0	0	0	1
Total				36	5	2	4	47

As of October 25, 2023

=== Assist leaders ===
Place	Position	Number	Name	MLS	Playoffs	Open Cup	Leagues Cup	Total
1	DF	47	(United States) John Tolkin	6	2	0	2	10
2	MF	21	(United States) Omir Fernandez	3	0	0	1	4
3	FW	11	(Brazil) Elias Manoel	3	0	0	0	3
3	FW	74	(United States) Tom Barlow	2	0	1	0	3
3	MF	82	(Brazil) Luquinhas	2	1	0	0	3
4	DF	6	(United States) Kyle Duncan	2	0	0	0	2
4	MF	17	(United States) Cameron Harper	2	0	0	0	2
5	FW	13	(Belgium) Dante Vanzeir	1	0	0	0	1
5	DF	15	(United States) Sean Nealis	1	0	0	0	1
5	MF	23	(Venezuela) Cristian Cásseres	1	0	0	0	1
5	MF	48	(Ghana) Ronald Donkor	1	0	0	0	1
5	MF	75	(United States) Daniel Edelman	0	1	0	0	1
Total				24	4	1	3	32

As of October 25, 2023

=== Cleansheets ===
Place	Position	Number	Name	MLS	Playoffs	Open Cup	Leagues Cup	Total
1	GK	1	(Paraguay) Carlos Coronel	9	0	0	2	11
2	GK	18	(United States) Ryan Meara	0	0	1	0	1
Total				9	0	1	2	12

As of October 25, 2023
