= John Tolkin =

American soccer player (born 2002)

John "JMi" Tolkin
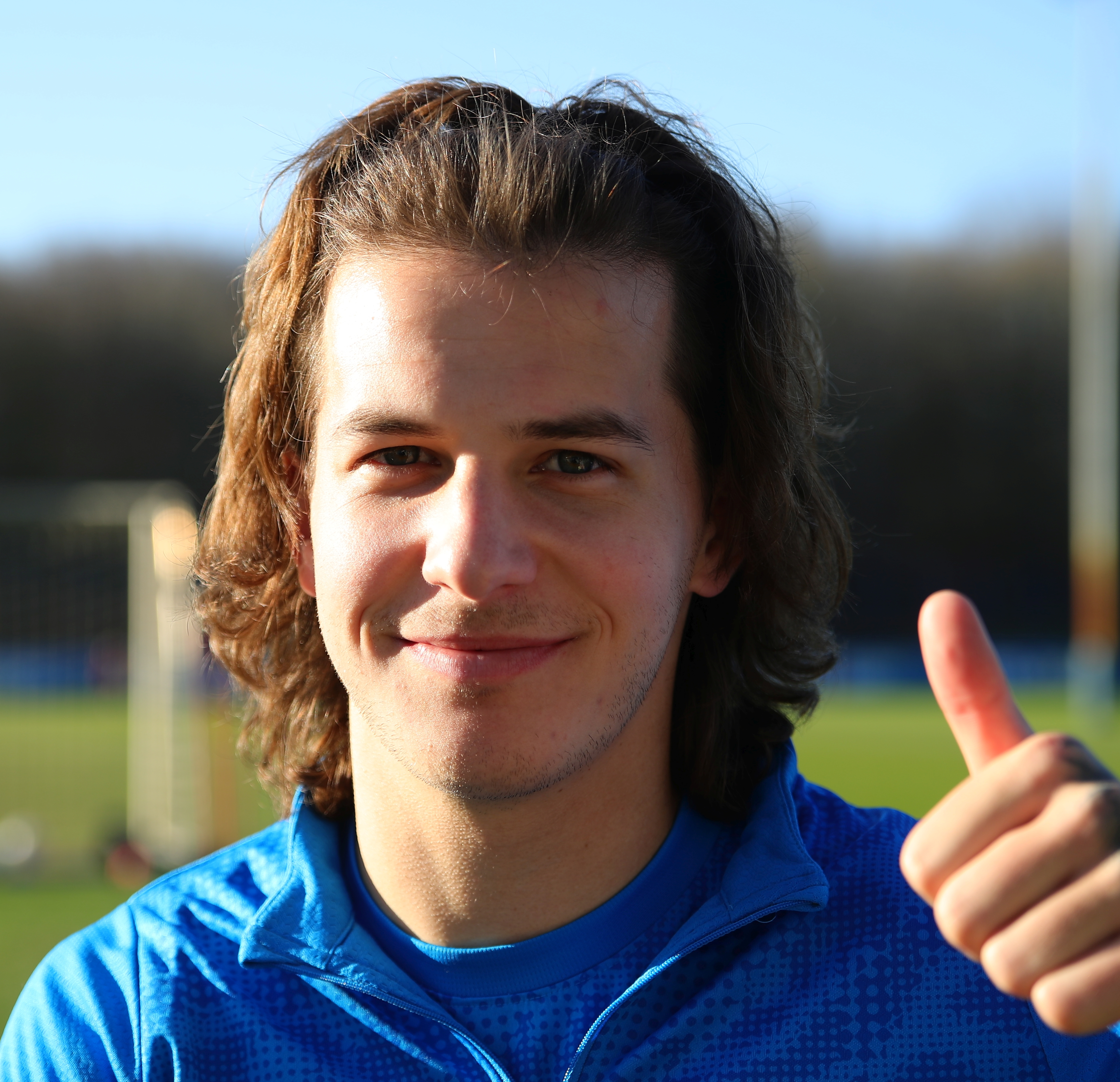
- Tolkin with Holstein Kiel in 2026

Personal information
- Full name: John Michael Tolkin
- Date of birth: July 31, 2002 (age 24)
- Place of birth: Chatham, New Jersey, United States
- Height: 5 ft 7 in (1.70 m)
- Position: Left-back

Team information
- Current team: Holstein Kiel
- Number: 47

Youth career
- 2015–2019: New York Red Bulls

Senior career*
Years	Team	Apps	(Gls)
2019–2021	New York Red Bulls II	26	(0)
2020–2025	New York Red Bulls	114	(7)
2025–	Holstein Kiel	38	(1)

International career^{‡}
2018–2019	United States U17	8	(0)
2023–2024	United States U23	11	(0)
2023–	United States	10	(0)
Medal record
Men's football
Representing United States
CONCACAF Gold Cup
Runner-up	2025 Canada–United States
- * Club domestic league appearances and goals as of May 18, 2026 ‡ National team caps and goals as of November 18, 2025

John Michael Tolkin (born July 31, 2002), nicknamed "JMi", is an American professional soccer player who plays as a left-back for 2. Bundesliga club Holstein Kiel and the United States national team. He competed for the United States at the 2024 Summer Olympics.

== Club career ==
=== Early career ===
Tolkin was raised in Chatham Borough, New Jersey, where he attended Chatham High School. Tolkin joined the New York Red Bulls Academy in 2015. During the 2019 USL Championship season he appeared for New York Red Bulls II. He made his professional debut on July 10, 2019, coming on as a second-half substitute in a 4–3 victory over Bethlehem Steel. During the match, he recorded his first professional assist on Tom Barlow's equalizer in the 82nd minute.

=== New York Red Bulls ===
After appearing for New York Red Bulls II in 2019, Tolkin moved up to the club's MLS roster on January 14, 2020. Tolkin made his MLS debut on May 8, 2021, appearing as a substitute against Toronto FC in a 2–0 victory. On May 29, 2021, Tolkin made his first start for the club in a 2–1 victory over Orlando City SC, earning praise for his play during the match. Tolkin scored his first professional goal on August 18, 2021, in a 1–0 win against the Columbus Crew.

On May 10, 2022, Tolkin scored his first goal of the season for New York in a 3–0 victory over DC United, helping his club advance to the round of 16 in the 2022 U.S. Open Cup. On August 18, 2022, Tolkin helped New York to a 2–1 victory over Atlanta United scoring the deciding goal. On October 5, 2022, Tolkin signed a new contract with New York tying him to the club until 2027, with an option for 2028 On November 18, 2022, Tolkin was named New York Red Bulls Defender of the Year for the 2022 season.

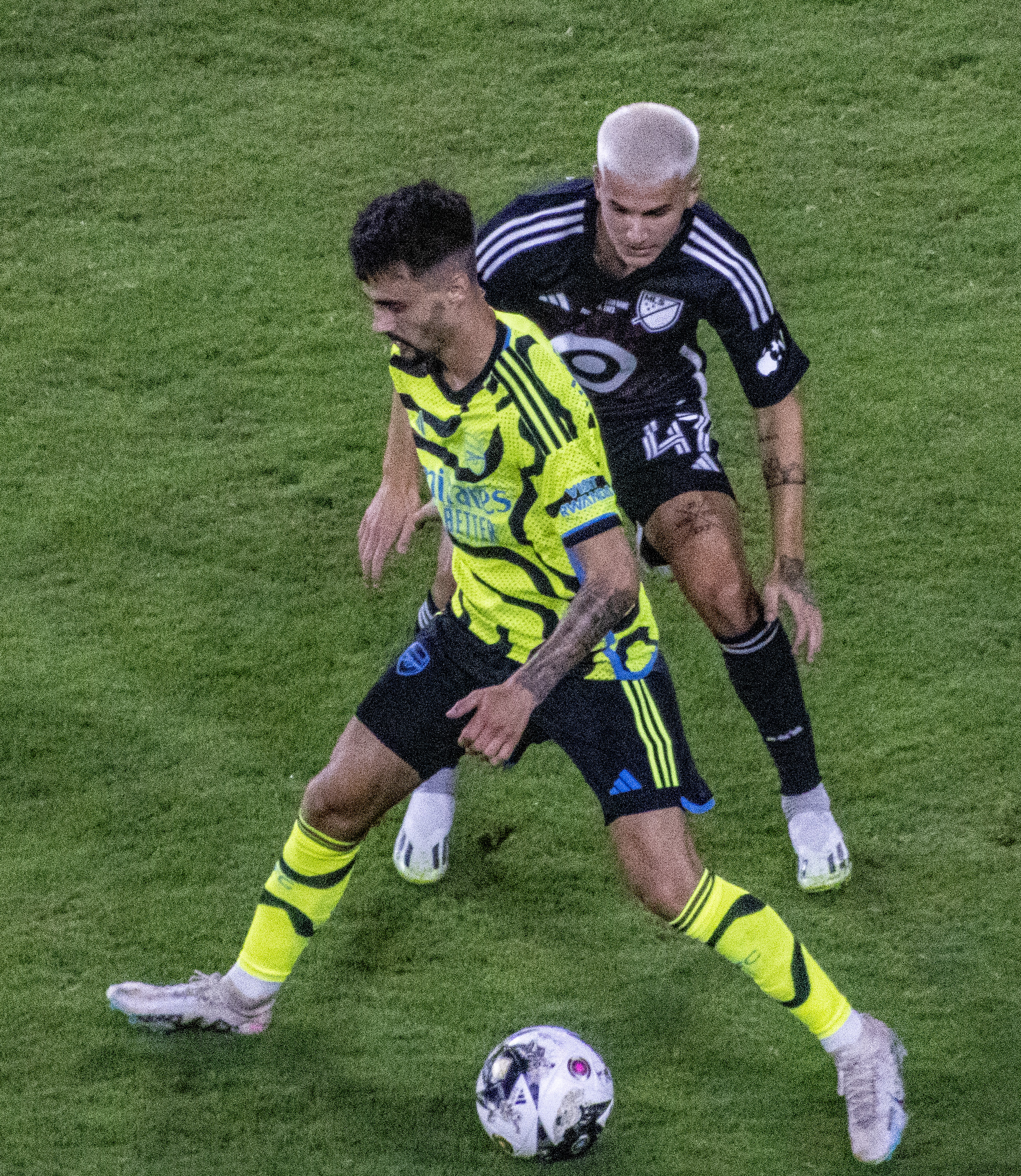
Tolkin (in black) playing in the 2023 MLS All-Star Game against Arsenal in 2023

On August 20, 2023, Tolkin scored his first goal of the season for New York, an 88th-minute free kick, to help his club to a 1–0 victory over rival DC United. On October 21, 2023, Tolkin scored from the penalty spot in stoppage time to lead New York to a 1–0 victory over Nashville SC. With this win the club qualified for the MLS Cup Playoffs for a record 14 straight seasons. On October 25, 2023, Tolkin scored on a freekick and assisted on two other goals for New York in a 5–2 victory over Charlotte FC, helping his club advance to the first round of the 2023 MLS Cup Playoffs.

On 1 June 2024, Tolkin made his 100th league appearance for New York, a match in which he scored on a free kick in a 1–0 victory over Orlando City SC. On 30 November 2024, Tolkin assisted Andrés Reyes on his headed set piece goal against Orlando City SC, sending the Red Bulls to MLS Cup 2024 in a 1–0 victory, where they went on to lose 2-1 to the LA Galaxy.

=== Holstein Kiel ===
On January 16, 2025, Tolkin transferred to Bundesliga club Holstein Kiel for a transfer fee of $3 million including a sell on fee. A day after the signing, due to outcry from some fans, the club released a statement in which Tolkin distanced himself again from his controversial social media likes, maintaining they are incompatible with his personal values and that he respects all people. Tolkin had previously liked social media posts mocking the LGBTQ community, critical of the response to the COVID-19 pandemic, questioning the existence of gravity and the January 6 United States Capitol attack and supporting flat Earth beliefs. Tolkin had also previously apologized for the behavior in a CBS Golazo interview during the 2024 Olympic games.

Tolkin made his debut for Holstein Kiel, when he came on in the 79th-minute for Dominik Javorček in a 2–2 draw with VfL Wolfsburg on January 24.

== Personal life ==
Tolkin's uncle gave him the nickname "JMi" when he was young, and his teammates and family refer to him as "JMi". He says he does not answer to "John".

== Career statistics ==
=== Club ===
As of match played August 30, 2025

Appearances and goals by club, season and competition
Club	Season	League			National cup		Continental		Other		Total	
Club	Season	Division	Apps	Goals	Apps	Goals	Apps	Goals	Apps	Goals	Apps	Goals
New York Red Bulls II	2019	USL	13	0	—		—		—		13	0
New York Red Bulls II	2020	USL	12	0	—		—		—		12	0
New York Red Bulls II	2021	USL	1	0	—		—		—		1	0
New York Red Bulls II	Total		26	0	—		—		—		26	0
New York Red Bulls	2020	MLS	—		—		—		—		0	0
New York Red Bulls	2021	MLS	28	1	—		—		1 (Note: Appearance(s) in MLS Cup playoffs)	0	29	1
New York Red Bulls	2022	MLS	31	1	5	1	—		1	0	37	2
New York Red Bulls	2023	MLS	27	3	2	0	4 (Note: Appearances in Leagues Cup)	0	3	1	36	4
New York Red Bulls	2024	MLS	28	2	—		—		5	0	33	2
New York Red Bulls	Total		114	7	7	1	4	0	10	1	135	9
Holstein Kiel	2024–25	Bundesliga	11	0	—		—		—		11	0
Holstein Kiel	2025–26	2. Bundesliga	27	1	4	1	—		—		31	2
Holstein Kiel	Total		38	1	4	1	—		—		42	2
Career total			178	8	11	2	4	0	10	1	177	11

=== International ===
As of match played November 18, 2025

Appearances and goals by national team and year
National team	Year	Apps	Goals
United States	2023	3	0
United States	2024	1	0
United States	2025	6	0
Total		10	0

== Honors ==
Individual

- MLS All-Star: 2023
