= Juan José Mina =

Colombian footballer (born 2004)

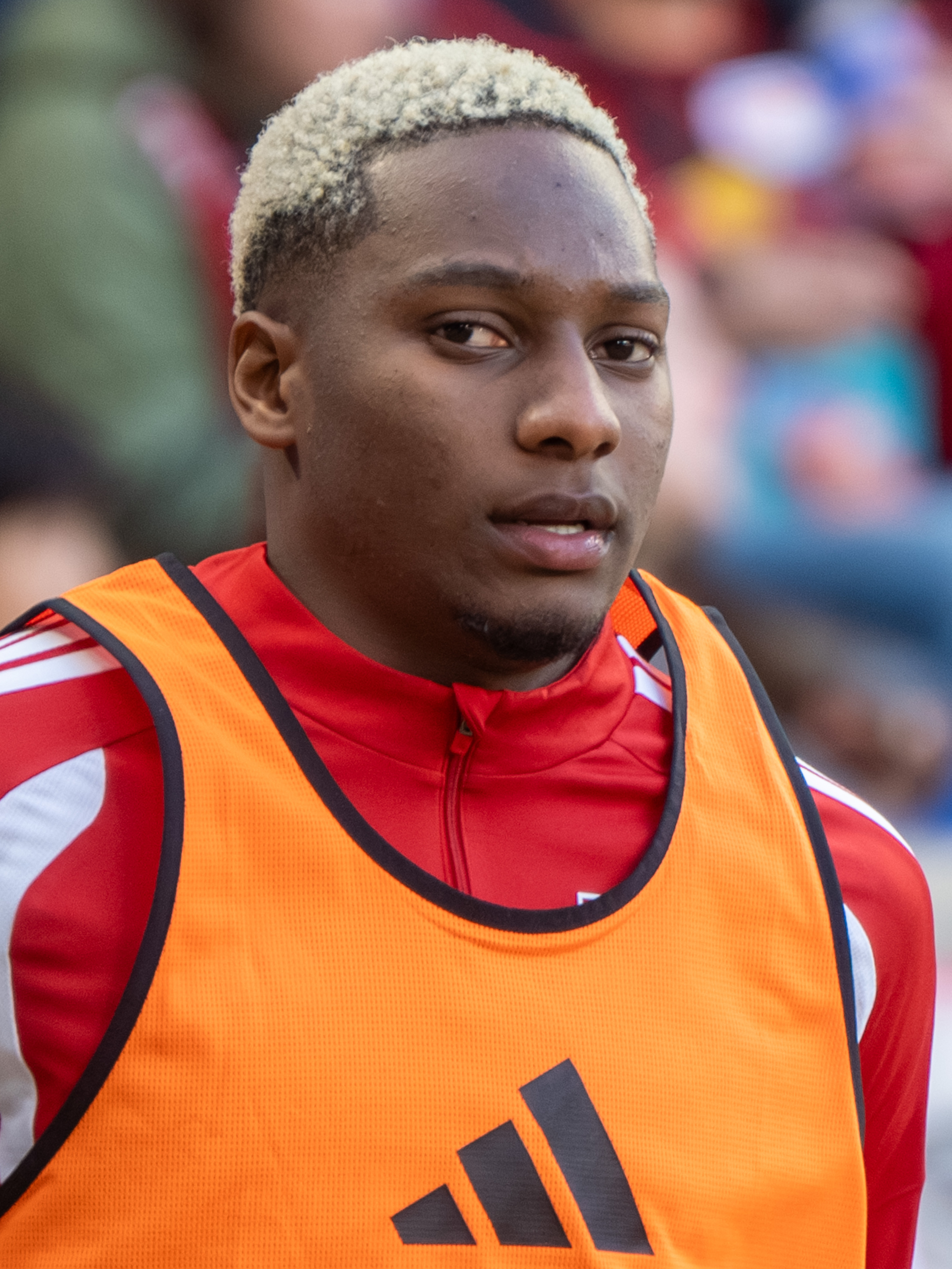
- Mina with the New York Red Bulls in 2026

Personal information
- Full name: Juan José Mina González
- Date of birth: 27 July 2004 (age 22)
- Place of birth: Guachené, Cauca, Colombia
- Height: 1.84 m (6 ft 0 in)
- Position: Right-back

Team information
- Current team: New York Red Bulls
- Number: 20

Youth career
- Club Raíces
- Villa Norte de Popayán
- 2022: Deportivo Cali

Senior career*
Years	Team	Apps	(Gls)
2022–2023	Deportivo Cali	20	(0)
2023–	New York Red Bulls	5	(0)
2023–	New York Red Bulls II	22	(0)
2024–2025	→ Estrela Amadora (loan)	1	(0)

International career
2019	Colombia U15	7	(0)
2020	Colombia U16	3	(0)
2021–2023	Colombia U20	10	(0)
- * Club domestic league appearances and goals as of 19:57, 15 November 2026 (UTC)

Juan José Mina González (born 27 July 2004) is a Colombian professional footballer who plays as a right-back for Major League Soccer club New York Red Bulls.

== Club career ==
Born in Guachené, Mina started his career with amateur sides Club Raíces, where he spent nearly seven years, and Villa Norte de Popayán, before trialling and signing with Deportivo Cali. He made his professional debut for the club on 7 May 2022, in a 1–1 Categoría Primera A draw with Santa Fe, getting the assist on Daniel Luna's goal. On May 19 of the same year, Mina made his Copa Libertadores debut, coming on for Aldair Gutiérrez at the 78th minute of a 3–0 victory against Always Ready of Bolivia.

On 31 July 2023, Mina signed with Major League Soccer side New York Red Bulls for an undisclosed fee.

On 16 August 2024, Mina was loaned to Estrela Amadora in Portugal, with an option to buy.

== International career ==
Mina has represented Colombia at under-15, under-16 and under-20 level. He was called up to the under-20 side for the 2023 South American U-20 Championship.

== Personal life ==
Mina is the brother of fellow professional footballer, and Colombian international, Yerry Mina.

== Career statistics ==
As of match played 2 August 2026

Appearances and goals by club, season and competition
Club	Season	League			National cup (Note: Includes Copa Colombia, U.S. Open Cup)		Continental		Other		Total	
Club	Season	Division	Apps	Goals	Apps	Goals	Apps	Goals	Apps	Goals	Apps	Goals
Deportivo Cali	2022	Categoría Primera A	15	0	0	0	3 (Note: One appearance in Copa Libertadores, two appearances in Copa Sudamericana)	0	0	0	18	0
Deportivo Cali	2023	Categoría Primera A	5	0	3	0	0	0	0	0	8	0
Deportivo Cali	Total		20	0	3	0	3	0	0	0	26	0
New York Red Bulls	2023	Major League Soccer	0	0	0	0	0	0	0	0	0	0
New York Red Bulls	2024	Major League Soccer	0	0	0	0	0	0	0	0	0	0
New York Red Bulls	2026	Major League Soccer	5	0	1	0	—		—		6	0
New York Red Bulls	Total		5	0	1	0	0	0	0	0	6	0
New York Red Bulls II	2023	MLS Next Pro	1	0	0	0	—		1 (Note: Appearance(s) in MLS Next Pro play-offs)	0	2	0
New York Red Bulls II	2024	MLS Next Pro	10	0	0	0	—		0	0	10	0
New York Red Bulls II	2025	MLS Next Pro	6	0	0	0	—		4	0	10	0
New York Red Bulls II	2026	MLS Next Pro	5	0	—		—		0	0	5	0
New York Red Bulls II	Total		22	0	0	0	0	0	5	0	27	0
Estrela Amadora (loan)	2024–25	Primeira Liga	1	0	0	0	—		—		1	0
Career total			48	0	4	0	3	0	5	0	60	0
