= 2023 MLS Cup playoffs =

2023 edition of the MLS playoffs

Tournament details
- Country: United States; Canada
- Dates: October 25 – December 9
- Teams: 18

Final positions
- Champions: Columbus Crew (3rd title)
- Runners-up: Los Angeles FC
- Semifinalists: FC Cincinnati Houston Dynamo FC

Tournament statistics
- Matches played: 28
- Goals scored: 78 (2.79 per match)
- Attendance: 646,677 (23,096 per match)
- Top goal scorer(s): (Gabon) Denis Bouanga (Colombia) Cucho Hernández (5 goals each)

The 2023 MLS Cup playoffs (branded as the Audi 2023 MLS Cup Playoffs for sponsorship reasons) was the post-season championship of Major League Soccer (MLS), the top soccer league in the United States and Canada. It was the 28th edition of the MLS Cup playoffs, the tournament culminating at the end of the 2023 season. The playoffs began on October 25 and concluded with MLS Cup 2023 on December 9.

Los Angeles FC entered the playoffs as the defending MLS Cup champions. FC Cincinnati entered as Supporters' Shield winners, but were eliminated by Columbus Crew in the Conference Finals. Charlotte FC and St. Louis City SC reached the MLS Cup playoffs for the first time in 2023, the latter qualifying in their debut MLS season.

Columbus Crew won a third MLS Cup title after defeating Los Angeles FC 2–1.

== Format ==
The playoffs featured a new format from previous years with an expanded field of 18 teams—the top nine teams from each conference. The top seven teams in each conference automatically qualify for round one while the eighth and ninth-placed teams in each conference contested a single wild card match for the right to play the No. 1 seed in their conference, with only a penalty shoot-out occurring if the game was tied. Round one comprised a best-of-three format with higher seeds playing against lower seeds, for the first time since 1999. The round did not have the aggregate score kept, and tied matches proceeded directly to a penalty shoot-out to determine the winner. The remaining three rounds — the Conference Semifinals, Conference Final, and MLS Cup — were single-elimination matches played with extra time and a penalty shoot-out if still tied. The team with the better regular season record hosted the match in all rounds except for the best-of-three series in round one, where the lower-ranked team hosted the second of three possible matches. All matches were broadcast globally on MLS Season Pass, a streaming service operated by Apple.

The introduction of a best-of-three round and the expanded field, which allowed 62% of the league's 29 teams to qualify for the playoffs, were criticized for being more confusing and diluting the competition. It was the first major revamp of the playoff format since 2019, when all rounds were switched to single-elimination matches. The format added more matches, including home games for lower seeds, and was developed with fan input according to MLS officials; other outlets noted that new broadcaster Apple TV would benefit from the additional matches. The new playoff format was announced on February 21, 2023, shortly before the start of the regular season; earlier media reports indicated that another format with a round-robin group stage was also considered.

Unlike regular season matches, playoff matches did not have a sixth substitute added for periods of extra time. Players were suspended for a match after accumulating three yellow cards; the suspension applied to the next match, whether it was in the playoffs or the 2024 regular season. In the event that a playoff match could not be played and neither team had forfeited or is at fault, the team with the higher points per game during the 2023 regular season would advance.

== Qualified teams ==
The playoffs were contested by eighteen teams. The date listed indicates when each team qualified for the playoffs.

Eastern Conference

- Atlanta United FC (September 23)
- Charlotte FC (October 21)
- Columbus Crew (September 20)
- FC Cincinnati (August 30)
- Nashville SC (September 30)
- New England Revolution (September 23)
- New York Red Bulls (October 21)
- Orlando City SC (September 20)
- Philadelphia Union (September 20)

Western Conference

- FC Dallas (October 21)
- Houston Dynamo FC (October 4)
- Los Angeles FC (October 4)
- Real Salt Lake (October 4)
- St. Louis City SC (September 20)
- San Jose Earthquakes (October 21)
- Seattle Sounders FC (October 4)
- Sporting Kansas City (October 21)
- Vancouver Whitecaps FC (October 4)

== Conference standings ==
Eastern Conference

MLS Eastern Conference table (2023)
Pos	Team	Pld	Pts
1	FC Cincinnati	34	69
2	Orlando City SC	34	63
3	Columbus Crew	34	57
4	Philadelphia Union	34	55
5	New England Revolution	34	55
6	Atlanta United FC	34	51
7	Nashville SC	34	49
8	New York Red Bulls	34	43
9	Charlotte FC	34	43

Source: MLS

Western Conference

MLS Western Conference table (2023)
Pos	Team	Pld	Pts
1	St. Louis City SC	34	56
2	Seattle Sounders FC	34	53
3	Los Angeles FC	34	52
4	Houston Dynamo FC	34	51
5	Real Salt Lake	34	50
6	Vancouver Whitecaps FC	34	48
7	FC Dallas	34	46
8	Sporting Kansas City	34	44
9	San Jose Earthquakes	34	44

Source: MLS

== Bracket ==
The higher seeded teams hosted single-elimination matches, with the MLS Cup host determined by overall points in the Supporters' Shield table. During the best-of-three round, the team with higher seed hosted the first match, and the third match if necessary.

Wild card single match
E8	New York Red Bulls	5
E9	Charlotte FC	2
W8	Sporting Kansas City (p)	0 (4)
W9	San Jose Earthquakes	0 (2)

Round one best-of-three series
E1	FC Cincinnati	3	1 (8)	–
E8	New York Red Bulls	0	1 (7)	–
E4	Philadelphia Union	3	1	–
E5	New England Revolution	1	0	–
E3	Columbus Crew	2	2	4
E6	Atlanta United FC	0	4	2
E2	Orlando City SC	1	1	–
E7	Nashville SC	0	0	–
W1	St. Louis City SC	1	1	–
W8	Sporting Kansas City	4	2	–
W4	Houston Dynamo FC	2	1 (4)	1 (4)
W5	Real Salt Lake	1	1 (5)	1 (3)
W3	Los Angeles FC	5	1	–
W6	Vancouver Whitecaps FC	2	0	–
W2	Seattle Sounders FC	2	1	1
W7	FC Dallas	0	3	0

Conference semifinals single match
E1	FC Cincinnati	1
E4	Philadelphia Union	0
Eastern Conference
E3	Columbus Crew (a.e.t.)	2
E2	Orlando City SC	0
W8	Sporting Kansas City	0
W4	Houston Dynamo FC	1
Western Conference
W3	Los Angeles FC	1
W2	Seattle Sounders FC	0

Conference finals single match
E1	FC Cincinnati	2
E3	Columbus Crew (a.e.t.)	3
W4	Houston Dynamo FC	0
W3	Los Angeles FC	2

MLS Cup single match
E3	Columbus Crew	2
W3	Los Angeles FC	1

== Wild card round ==
=== Eastern Conference ===
October 25
7:30 pm EDT

New York Red Bulls	5–2	Charlotte FC
Elias 10', 37', 78'; Tolkin 26'; Barlow 56'	Report	Vargas 49'; Agyemang 64'

Red Bull Arena, Harrison, New Jersey
Attendance: 16,074
Referee: Ismail Elfath

=== Western Conference ===
October 25
8:30 pm CDT
(9:30 pm EDT)

Sporting Kansas City	0–0	San Jose Earthquakes
	Report
Penalties
Russell (penalty scored); Pulido (penalty missed); Thommy (penalty scored); Kinda (penalty scored); Sallói (penalty scored)	4–2	(penalty missed) Espinoza; (penalty missed) Yueill; (penalty scored) Skahan; (penalty scored) Akapo

Children's Mercy Park, Kansas City, Kansas
Attendance: 17,437
Referee: Allen Chapman

== Round one ==
Team 1	Series	Team 2	Match 1	Match 2	Match 3
Eastern Conference
FC Cincinnati	2–0	New York Red Bulls	3–0	1–1 (8–7 p)	—
Orlando City SC	2–0	Nashville SC	1–0	1–0	—
Columbus Crew	2–1	Atlanta United FC	2–0	2–4	4–2
Philadelphia Union	2–0	New England Revolution	3–1	1–0	—
Western Conference
St. Louis City SC	0–2	Sporting Kansas City	1–4	1–2	—
Seattle Sounders FC	2–1	FC Dallas	2–0	1–3	1–0
Los Angeles FC	2–0	Vancouver Whitecaps FC	5–2	1–0	—
Houston Dynamo FC	2–1	Real Salt Lake	2–1	1–1 (4–5 p)	1–1 (4–3 p)

=== Eastern Conference ===
October 29
8:00 pm EDT

FC Cincinnati	3–0	New York Red Bulls
Barreal 23', 89'; Acosta 35'	Report

TQL Stadium, Cincinnati, Ohio
Attendance: 24,022
Referee: Rubiel Vazquez
November 4
7:00 pm EDT

New York Red Bulls	1–1	FC Cincinnati
Barlow 45'	Report	Boupendza 75'
Penalties
Fernandez (penalty scored); Amaya (penalty scored); S. Nealis (penalty scored); Harper (penalty scored); Tolkin (penalty missed); D. Nealis (penalty scored); Elias (penalty scored); Stroud (penalty scored); Ngoma (penalty missed); Reyes (penalty missed)	7–8	(penalty scored) Acosta; (penalty scored) Kubo; (penalty missed) Arias; (penalty scored) Vázquez; (penalty scored) Barreal; (penalty scored) Miazga; (penalty scored) Boupendza; (penalty scored) Santos; (penalty missed) Mosquera; (penalty scored) Moreno

Red Bull Arena, Harrison, New Jersey
Attendance: 20,044
Referee: Victor Rivas

FC Cincinnati won the series 2–0.

October 30
7:00 pm EDT

Orlando City SC	1–0	Nashville SC
Cartagena 41'	Report

Exploria Stadium, Orlando, Florida
Attendance: 19,744
Referee: Armando Villarreal
November 7
8:00 pm CST

Nashville SC	0–1	Orlando City SC
	Report	Angulo 6'

Geodis Park, Nashville, Tennessee
Attendance: 25,315
Referee: Allen Chapman

Orlando City SC won the series 2–0.

November 1
7:30 pm EDT

Columbus Crew	2–0	Atlanta United FC
Hernández 45+1', 51' (pen.)	Report

Lower.com Field, Columbus, Ohio
Attendance: 20,176
Referee: Lukasz Szpala
November 7
7:00 pm EST

Atlanta United FC	4–2	Columbus Crew
Giakoumakis 38'; Silva 45+4'; Mosquera 83'; Almada 88'	Report	Hernández 45'; Arfsten 90+5'

Mercedes-Benz Stadium, Atlanta, Georgia
Attendance: 41,850
Referee: Chris Penso
November 12
7:00 pm EST

Columbus Crew	4–2	Atlanta United FC
Nagbe 9'; Amundsen 17'; Mățan 33'; Rossi 47'	Report	Giakoumakis 35'; Silva 50'

Lower.com Field, Columbus, Ohio
Attendance: 20,182
Referee: Armando Villarreal

Columbus Crew won the series 2–1.

October 28
5:00 pm EDT

Philadelphia Union	3–1	New England Revolution
Gazdag 19' (pen.); Uhre 26'; Harriel 37'	Report	Bou 68'

Subaru Park, Chester, Pennsylvania
Attendance: 19,778
Referee: Pierre-Luc Lauzière
November 8
7:00 pm EST

New England Revolution	0–1	Philadelphia Union
	Report	Donovan 79'

Gillette Stadium, Foxborough, Massachusetts
Attendance: 15,214
Referee: Drew Fischer

Philadelphia Union won the series 2–0.

=== Western Conference ===
October 29
9:00 pm CDT

St. Louis City SC	1–4	Sporting Kansas City
Parker 28'	Report	Ndenbe 27'; Walter 36'; Kinda 39'; Sallói 61'

CityPark, St. Louis, Missouri
Attendance: 22,423
Referee: Ted Unkel
November 5
4:00 pm CST

Sporting Kansas City	2–1	St. Louis City SC
Ndenbe 45+1'; Sallói 73'	Report	Pompeu 86'

Children's Mercy Park, Kansas City, Kansas
Attendance: 21,650
Referee: Ismail Elfath

Sporting Kansas City won the series 2–0.

October 30
6:00 pm PDT

Seattle Sounders FC	2–0	FC Dallas
Rusnák 43' (pen.); Morris 74'	Report

Lumen Field, Seattle, Washington
Attendance: 30,741
Referee: Joe Dickerson
November 4
8:00 pm CDT

FC Dallas	3–1	Seattle Sounders FC
Arriola 6'; Ferreira 18' (pen.); Obrian 89'	Report	Morris 48'

Toyota Stadium, Frisco, Texas
Attendance: 19,096
Referee: Rosendo Mendoza
November 10
7:00 pm PST

Seattle Sounders FC	1–0	FC Dallas
Rusnák 36'	Report

Lumen Field, Seattle, Washington
Attendance: 33,048
Referee: Fotis Bazakos

Seattle Sounders FC won the series 2–1.

October 28
5:00 pm PDT

Los Angeles FC	5–2	Vancouver Whitecaps FC
Hollingshead 18', 52'; Bouanga 29', 64'; Murillo 80'	Report	White 27'; Adekugbe 40'

BMO Stadium, Los Angeles, California
Attendance: 22,002
Referee: Jon Freemon
November 5
4:30 pm PST

Vancouver Whitecaps FC	0–1	Los Angeles FC
	Report	Bouanga 24' (pen.)

BC Place, Vancouver, British Columbia
Attendance: 30,204
Referee: Tim Ford

Los Angeles FC won the series 2–0.

October 29
5:00 pm CDT

Houston Dynamo FC	2–1	Real Salt Lake
Herrera 22'; Bassi 79'	Report	Luna 54'

Shell Energy Stadium, Houston, Texas
Attendance: 17,508
Referee: Guido Gonzales Jr.
November 6
7:00 pm MST

Real Salt Lake	1–1	Houston Dynamo FC
Savarino 70'	Report	Bassi 28'
Penalties
Arango (penalty scored); Kreilach (penalty scored); Savarino (penalty scored); Vera (penalty scored); Luna (penalty scored)	5–4	(penalty missed) Bassi; (penalty scored) Carrasquilla; (penalty scored) Úlfarrson; (penalty scored) Dorsey; (penalty scored) Quiñónes

America First Field, Sandy, Utah
Attendance: 20,251
Referee: Fotis Bazakos
November 11
3:00 pm CST

Houston Dynamo FC	1–1	Real Salt Lake
Baird 28'	Report	Luna 65'
Penalties
Carrasquilla (penalty scored); Úlfarrson (penalty scored); Bassi (penalty scored); Quiñónes (penalty missed); Dorsey (penalty scored)	4–3	(penalty scored) Arango; (penalty scored) Rubin; (penalty missed) Luna; (penalty scored) Vera; (penalty missed) Musovski

Shell Energy Stadium, Houston, Texas
Attendance: 16,374
Referee: Chris Penso

Houston Dynamo FC won the series 2–1.

== Conference semifinals ==
The higher-seeded team as determined by regular season ranking hosted the match.

Team 1	Score	Team 2
Eastern Conference
Orlando City SC	0–2 (a.e.t.)	Columbus Crew
FC Cincinnati	1–0	Philadelphia Union
Western Conference
Houston Dynamo FC	1–0	Sporting Kansas City
Seattle Sounders FC	0–1	Los Angeles FC

=== Eastern Conference ===
November 25
5:30 pm EST

Orlando City SC	0–2 (a.e.t.)	Columbus Crew
	Report	Ramirez 93'; Hernández 118'

Exploria Stadium, Orlando, Florida
Attendance: 25,527
Referee: Jon Freemon

November 25
8:00 pm EST

FC Cincinnati	1–0	Philadelphia Union
Mosquera 90+4'	Report

TQL Stadium, Cincinnati, Ohio
Attendance: 25,513
Referee: Ismail Elfath

=== Western Conference ===
November 26
6:00 pm CST

Houston Dynamo FC	1–0	Sporting Kansas City
Escobar 39'	Report

Shell Energy Stadium, Houston, Texas
Attendance: 20,319
Referee: Guido Gonzales Jr.

November 26
6:30 pm PST

Seattle Sounders FC	0–1	Los Angeles FC
	Report	Bouanga 30'

Lumen Field, Seattle, Washington
Attendance: 33,649
Referee: Ted Unkel

== Conference finals ==
The higher-seeded team as determined by regular season ranking hosted the match.

=== Eastern Conference ===
December 2
6:00 pm EST

FC Cincinnati	2–3 (a.e.t.)	Columbus Crew
Vázquez 14'; Acosta 45+3'	Report	Powell 75' (o.g.); Rossi 86'; Ramirez 115'

TQL Stadium, Cincinnati, Ohio
Attendance: 25,513
Referee: Allen Chapman

=== Western Conference ===
December 2
6:30 pm PST

Los Angeles FC	2–0	Houston Dynamo FC
Hollingshead 44'; Escobar 80' (o.g.)	Report

BMO Stadium, Los Angeles, California
Attendance: 22,221
Referee: Victor Rivas

== MLS Cup 2023 ==
The highest-ranked finalist in the overall Supporters' Shield table (Columbus Crew) hosted the match.

December 9, 2023
4:00 p.m. EST

Columbus Crew	2–1	Los Angeles FC
Hernández 33' (pen.); Yeboah 37'	Report	Bouanga 74'

Lower.com Field, Columbus, Ohio
Attendance: 20,802
Referee: Armando Villarreal

== Top goalscorers ==
Rank	Player	Club	Goals
1	(Gabon) Denis Bouanga	Los Angeles FC	5
1	(Colombia) Cucho Hernández	Columbus Crew	5
3	(Brazil) Elias	New York Red Bulls	3
3	(United States) Ryan Hollingshead	Los Angeles FC	3
5	(Argentina) Luciano Acosta	FC Cincinnati	2
5	(United States) Tom Barlow	New York Red Bulls	2
5	(Argentina) Álvaro Barreal	FC Cincinnati	2
5	(Morocco) Amine Bassi	Houston Dynamo FC	2
5	(Greece) Giorgos Giakoumakis	Atlanta United FC	2
5	(United States) Diego Luna	Real Salt Lake	2
5	(United States) Jordan Morris	Seattle Sounders FC	2
5	(Belgium) Logan Ndenbe	Sporting Kansas City	2
5	(United States) Christian Ramirez	Columbus Crew	2
5	(Uruguay) Diego Rossi	Columbus Crew	2
5	(Slovakia) Albert Rusnák	Seattle Sounders FC	2
5	(Hungary) Dániel Sallói	Sporting Kansas City	2
5	(Portugal) Xande Silva	Atlanta United FC	2
