= Carlos Coronel =

Paraguayan footballer (born 1996)

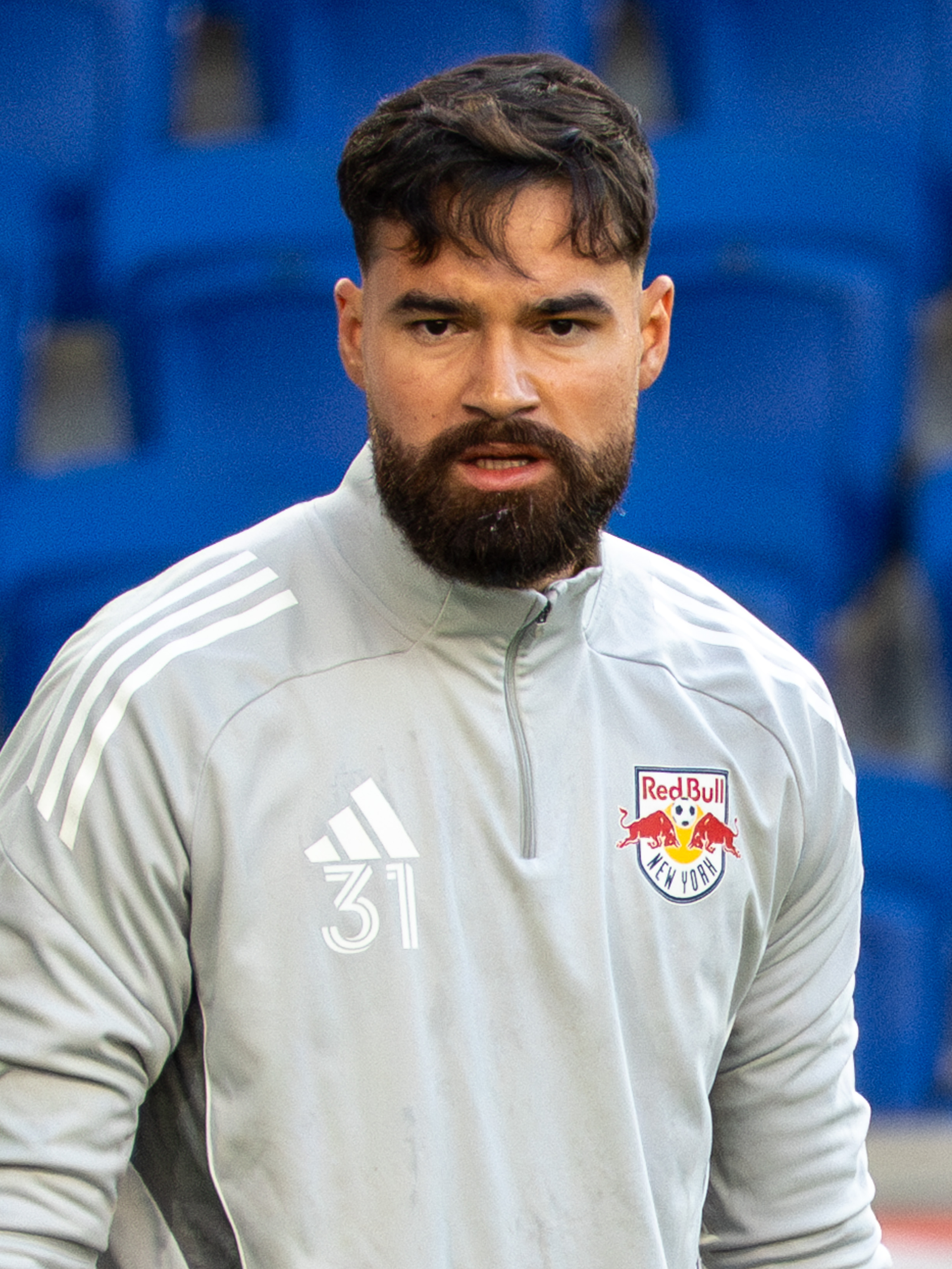
- Coronel with the New York Red Bulls in 2025

Personal information
- Full name: Carlos Miguel Coronel
- Date of birth: 29 December 1996 (age 29)
- Place of birth: Porto Murtinho, Brazil
- Height: 1.92 m (6 ft 4 in)
- Position: Goalkeeper

Team information
- Current team: São Paulo
- Number: 31

Youth career
- 2013–2015: Red Bull Brasil

Senior career*
Years	Team	Apps	(Gls)
2015–2018	FC Liefering	67	(0)
2017–2021	Red Bull Salzburg	7	(0)
2019	→ Philadelphia Union (loan)	4	(0)
2019	→ Bethlehem Steel (loan)	8	(0)
2021	→ New York Red Bulls (loan)	34	(0)
2022–2025	New York Red Bulls	125	(0)
2026–	São Paulo	0	(0)

International career^{‡}
2023–	Paraguay	9	(0)
- * Club domestic league appearances and goals as of 20:02, 3 January 2026 (UTC) ‡ National team caps and goals as of 20:42, 18 August 2025 (UTC)

Carlos Miguel Coronel (born 29 December 1996) is a professional footballer who plays as a goalkeeper for Campeonato Brasileiro Série A club São Paulo. Born in Brazil, he plays for the Paraguay national team.

== Club career ==
=== Early career ===
Born in Porto Murtinho, Brazil, Carlos Coronel started his career with the youth setup of Red Bull Brasil. At Red Bull Brasil he was called up to the first team and served as a substitute goalkeeper in the São Paulo State Cup several times in the 2013 and 2014 seasons, but did not play.

=== Red Bull Salzburg ===
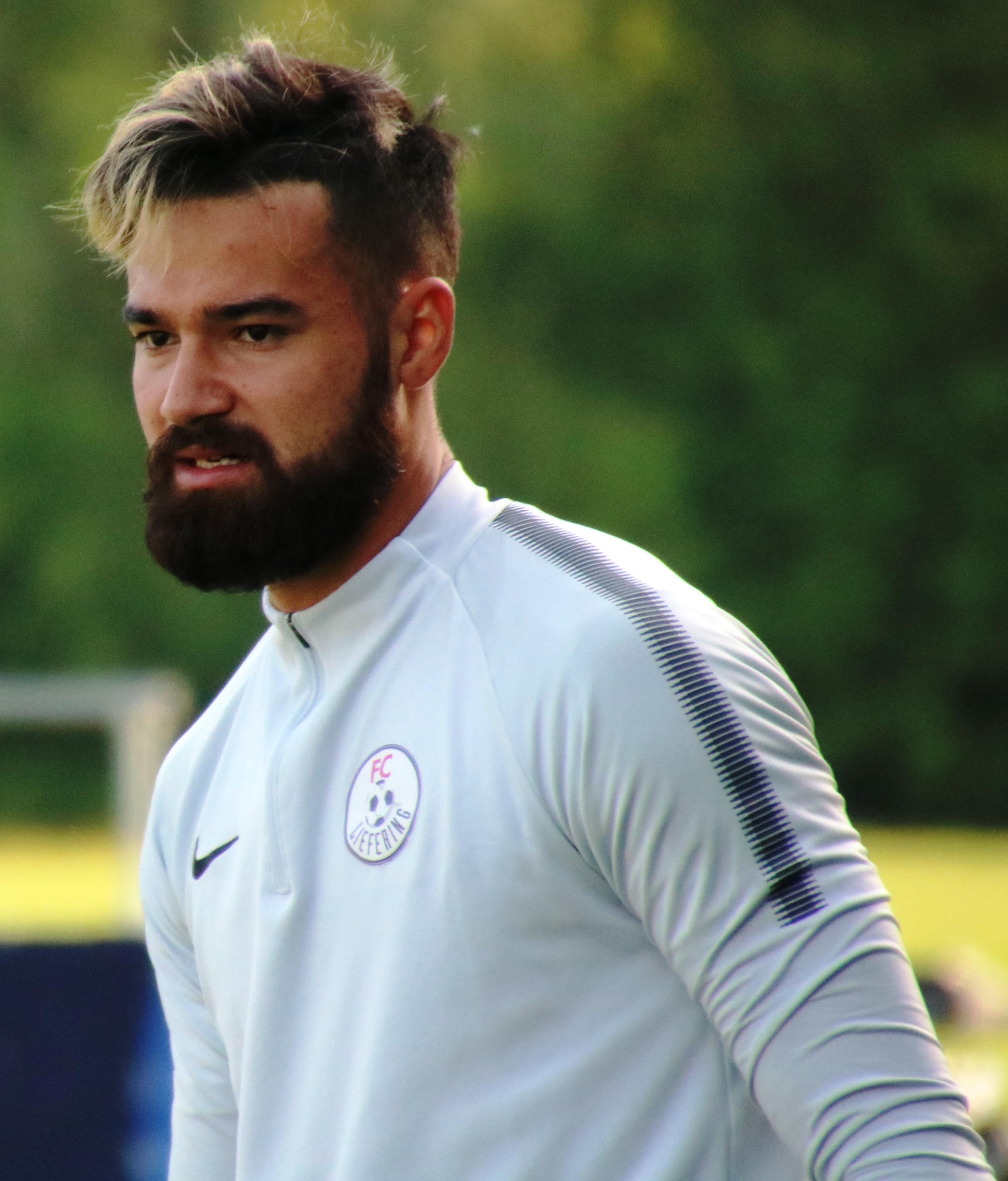
Coronel with FC Liefering in 2018

In the summer of 2015, he moved to Austrian Bundesliga club Red Bull Salzburg. However, he was soon loaned to Salzburg reserve club FC Liefering playing in the 2. Liga. He made his debut for Liefering in July 2015, when he was in the starting line-up against SKN St. Pölten on the second match day of the 2015–16 season.

In May 2018, he made his debut for Salzburg in the Bundesliga, appearing as a starter against FK Austria Wien. He remained a regular starter for FC Liefering during the 2017–18 season playing in 32 matches for the second division side.

==== Philadelphia Union (loan) ====
On 24 January 2019, Coronel joined Major League Soccer club Philadelphia Union on loan from Red Bull Salzburg. While with Philadelphia, Coronel appeared in four league matches plus eight matches with affiliate side Bethlehem Steel FC, before being recalled by Salzburg in July 2019.

==== Return to Salzburg ====
Amid an injury crisis after Cican Stanković was injured and substitute goalkeeper Alexander Walke had been injured for a long time, Coronel made his UEFA Champions League debut after coming on for Stankovic on 23 October 2019 against SSC Napoli in a 2–3 loss. On 6 November 2019, he helped Salzburg to a 1–1 draw against SSC Napoli in the UEFA Champions League, garnering praise for his performance in the match. He ended the 2019–20 season by making five appearances in the Bundesliga, one in the ÖFB-Cup and three in the Champions League, as Salzburg won the cup and league double that season.

==== New York Red Bulls (loan) ====
On 26 February 2021, Coronel joined Major League Soccer club, the New York Red Bulls on loan from Red Bull Salzburg. On 17 April 2021, Coronel made his debut for New York, appearing as a starter in a 2–1 loss to Sporting Kansas City. On 1 May 2021, he recorded his first shutout for New York in a 2–0 victory over Chicago Fire FC. On 17 October 2021, Coronel recorded his eleventh clean sheet of the season in a 1–0 victory over rival New York City FC in the Hudson River Derby. Coronel ended his first season with New York appearing in 34 league matches and recording 13 clean sheets.

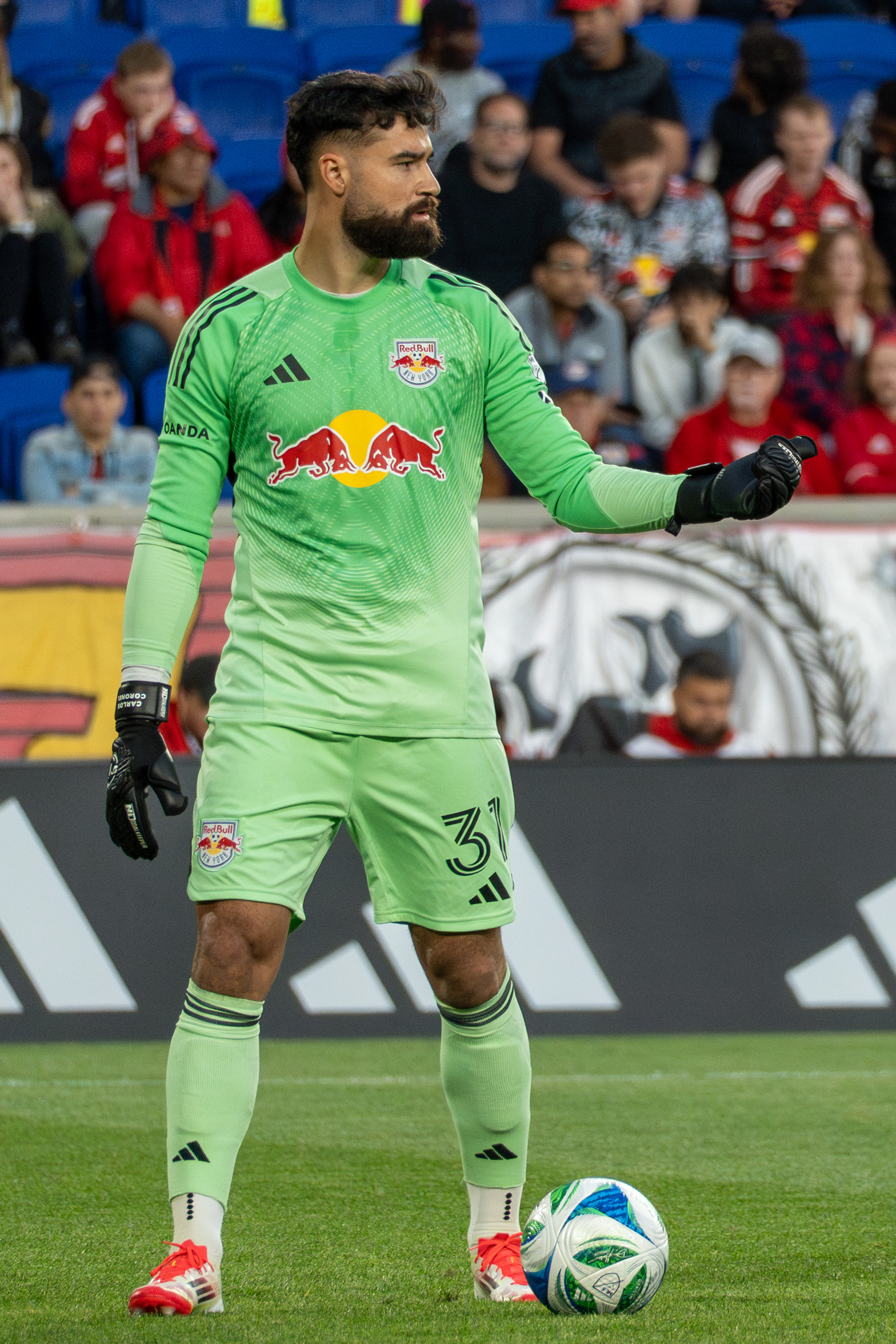
Carlos Coronel with the New York Red Bulls in 2025

=== New York Red Bulls ===
On 6 December 2021, it was announced that New York had acquired Coronel on a permanent deal from Red Bull Salzburg, signing a three-year deal with the club. On 22 June 2022, Coronel helped New York to advance to the semifinals of the 2022 U.S. Open Cup, keeping a clean sheet in a 3–0 victory over local rival New York City FC. On 31 August 2022, Coronel helped New York to a 1–0 victory over CF Montréal, helping his club register its record ninth road win of the season.

On 23 May 2023, New York head coach Troy Lesesne had Coronel replace outfielder Matt Nocita in the final moments of extra time in New York's U.S. Open Cup match against FC Cincinnati. Lesesne said that he substituted Nocita instead of goalkeeper Ryan Meara because he wanted Meara to play the full match, but that Coronel was "quite good at taking penalties". New York lost the penalty shootout 5–3 before Coronel had an opportunity to participate. On 21 October, Coronel recorded his 30th career shutout with the Red Bulls and his ninth of the season in MLS to lead New York to a 1–0 victory over Nashville SC. With this win the club qualified for the MLS Cup Playoffs for a record 14 straight seasons.

On 29 October 2024, Coronel helped New York to a 1–0 victory over Columbus Crew in the MLS Cup Playoffs, recording eight saves. On 30 November 2024, Coronel recorded his third shut out in four playoff matches, helping New York to a 1–0 victory over Orlando City SC, sending the Red Bulls to MLS Cup 2024.

In November 2025, New York and Coronel failed to reach an agreement on a new contract and the team announced that he would not be resigning with the club.

=== São Paulo ===
On 3 January 2026, Coronel returned to Brazil and signed with Série A club São Paulo through December 2028. On 28 April, Coronel made his debut in a Copa Sudamericana game against Millonarios, securing a goalless draw.

== International career ==
In August 2023, Coronel received his first call-up to the Paraguayan senior national team by head coach Guillermo Barros Schelotto, for the 2026 FIFA World Cup qualifiers against Peru and Venezuela.

== Personal life ==
Born in Brazil, Coronel is of Paraguayan descent through his mother; he became a naturalized citizen of Paraguay in July 2023.

== Career statistics ==
=== Club ===
As of match played 7 May 2026

Appearances and goals by club, season and competition
Club	Season	League			State league		National cup (Note: Includes Austrian Cup, U.S. Open Cup)		Continental		Other		Total	
Club	Season	Division	Apps	Goals	Apps	Goals	Apps	Goals	Apps	Goals	Apps	Goals	Apps	Goals
Liefering	2015–16	2. Liga	11	0	—		—		—		—		11	0
Liefering	2016–17	2. Liga	24	0	—		—		—		—		24	0
Liefering	2017–18	2. Liga	32	0	—		—		—		—		32	0
Liefering	Total		67	0	—		—		—		—		67	0
Red Bull Salzburg	2017–18	Austrian Bundesliga	1	0	—		0	0	0	0	—		1	0
Red Bull Salzburg	2018–19	Austrian Bundesliga	0	0	—		0	0	0	0	—		0	0
Red Bull Salzburg	2019–20	Austrian Bundesliga	5	0	—		1	0	3 (Note: Appearances in UEFA Champions League)	0	—		9	0
Red Bull Salzburg	2020–21	Austrian Bundesliga	1	0	—		0	0	0	0	—		1	0
Red Bull Salzburg	Total		7	0	—		1	0	3	0	—		11	0
Philadelphia Union (loan)	2019	Major League Soccer	4	0	—		0	0	—		—		4	0
Bethlehem Steel (loan)	2019	USL Championship	8	0	—		—		—		—		8	0
New York Red Bulls (loan)	2021	Major League Soccer	34	0	—		—		—		1 (Note: Appearance in MLS Cup playoffs)	0	35	0
New York Red Bulls	2022	Major League Soccer	33	0	—		3	0	—		1	0	37	0
New York Red Bulls	2023	Major League Soccer	34	0	—		1	0	—		7 (Note: Three appearances in MLS Cup playoffs, four appearances in Leagues Cup)	0	42	0
New York Red Bulls	2024	Major League Soccer	27	0	—		—		—		6 (Note: Five appearances in MLS Cup playoffs, one appearance in Leagues Cup)	0	33	0
New York Red Bulls	2025	Major League Soccer	31	0	—		1	0	—		1 (Note: Appearance in Leagues Cup)	0	33	0
New York Red Bulls	Total		159	0	—		5	0	—		16	0	180	0
São Paulo	2026	Série A	0	0	0	0	0	0	2 (Note: Appearances in Copa Sudamericana)	0	—		2	0
Career total			245	0	9	9	6	0	5	0	16	0	272	0

=== International ===
As of match played 17 June 2024.

Appearances and goals by national team and year
National team	Year	Apps	Goals
Paraguay	2023	6	0
Paraguay	2024	3	0
Total		9	0

== Honours ==
Red Bull Salzburg

- Austrian Bundesliga: 2017–18, 2019–20
- Austrian Cup: 2018–19, 2019–20
