= Coachella Valley Invitational =

Soccer tournament in Indio, California

- Founded: 2022
- Region: United States; California (host)
- Teams: 6 (2022); 10 (2024)
- Current champions: New York Red Bulls
- Most championships: LA Galaxy II (1); New York Red Bulls (1)
- 2026 Coachella Valley Invitational

The Coachella Valley Invitational is a preseason exhibition tournament hosted by the LA Galaxy at the Empire Polo Club in Indio, California. The first edition of the tournament was held in February 2022 and featured clubs from Major League Soccer, MLS Next Pro, and the USL Championship. It was expanded to include National Women's Soccer League teams in the 2024 edition.

== History ==
The tournament was announced on January 18, 2022, by the LA Galaxy and the Anschutz Entertainment Group (AEG), the owner of the team and the Empire Polo Club. The company had sought new events for the Empire Polo Club, the host of the annual Coachella music and arts festival as well as polo, during its lower-demand months. AEG chief executive Dan Beckerman proposed an MLS preseason tournament that emulated spring training for baseball teams; the LA Galaxy had previously declined requests to host preseason tournaments at their training facilities in Carson, California, due to inadequate space. The first edition of the event was held behind closed doors and had six teams.

The second edition in February 2023 featured 12 MLS teams and a USL Championship side—San Diego Loyal FC. Ticket sales were opened for matches and teams were each assigned a groundskeeper to fulfill requests from coaching staff. The 2024 edition drew 30,000 fans and was expanded by a week to accommodate its larger field of 18 teams—including four from the National Women's Soccer League (NWSL). A limit of 5,000 spectators for each of the seven match days was set for the tournament, during which teams played a minimum of two public matches and had the option of scheduling additional fixtures behind closed doors.

The 2025 edition will take place over a three-week period in February and include fourteen MLS teams and six from the NWSL. The Empire Polo Grounds has two fields that will be used during the tournament.

== Participants ==
=== 2022 edition ===
==== Standings ====
Pos	Team	Pld	W	D	L	GF	GA	GD	Pts	PPG	Qualification
1	LA Galaxy II	1	1	0	0	4	2	+2	3	3.00	Champions
2	D.C. United	2	1	1	0	3	1	+2	4	2.00	
3	LA Galaxy	2	1	1	0	3	2	+1	4	2.00	
4	Los Angeles FC	2	1	0	1	6	3	+3	3	1.50	
5	Seattle Sounders FC	2	0	1	1	3	5	−2	1	0.50	
6	New York Red Bulls	3	0	1	2	3	9	−6	1	0.33	

Rules for classification: 1) points per game; 2) total wins per match played; 3) total goal differential per match played; 4) total goals scored per match played; 5) fewest disciplinary points per match played; 6) away goal differential per away match played; 7) away goals scored per away match played; 8) home goal differential per home match played; 9) home goals scored per home match played; 10) coin toss or drawing of lots.

==== Teams ====
Team	Location	League
D.C. United	Washington, D.C.	Major League Soccer
LA Galaxy	Los Angeles	Major League Soccer
Los Angeles FC	Los Angeles	Major League Soccer
New York Red Bulls	New York City	Major League Soccer
Seattle Sounders FC	Seattle	Major League Soccer
LA Galaxy II	Los Angeles	USL Championship

==== Matches ====
February 10
11:00 am PST (UTC−8)

LA Galaxy	1–1	Seattle Sounders FC
Joveljić 48'	Report	Ruidíaz 41'

Empire Polo Club, Indio, California
Attendance: 0
February 10
1:00 pm PST (UTC−8)

LA Galaxy II	4–2	Seattle Sounders FC
Davila 40'; Salazar 49', 57'; Cobian 72'	Report	Montero 21'; Adeniran 29'

Empire Polo Club, Indio, California
Attendance: 0
February 10
4:00 pm PST (UTC−8)

New York Red Bulls	1–1	D.C. United
Barlow 65'	Report	Flores 27'

Empire Polo Club, Indio, CA
Attendance: 0
February 13
12:00 pm PST (UTC−8)

LA Galaxy	2–1	New York Red Bulls
Vazquez 4'; Hernandez 54'	Report	Mullings 68'

Empire Polo Club, Indio, California
Attendance: 0
February 15
4:00 pm PST (UTC−8)

D.C. United	2–0	Los Angeles FC
Kamara 9' (pen.); Skundrich 77'	Report

Empire Polo Club, Indio, California
Attendance: 0
February 19
12:00 pm PST (UTC−8)

Los Angeles FC	6–1	New York Red Bulls
Rodríguez 28', 34'; 38' (o.g.); Vela 46'; Fall 58'; Opoku 60'	Report	Klimala 9' (pen.)

Empire Polo Club, Indio, California
Attendance: 0

=== 2023 edition ===
==== Standings ====
Pos	Team	Pld	W	D	L	GF	GA	GD	Pts	PPG
1	New York Red Bulls	3	3	0	0	4	0	+4	9	3.00
2	Portland Timbers	3	2	1	0	7	3	+4	7	2.33
3	San Jose Earthquakes	3	2	0	1	6	4	+2	6	2.00
4	Vancouver Whitecaps FC	6	3	3	0	9	3	+6	12	2.00
5	Charlotte FC	2	1	0	1	4	3	+1	3	1.50
6	Los Angeles FC	2	1	0	1	3	3	0	3	1.50
7	LA Galaxy	3	1	0	2	5	6	−1	3	1.00
8	D.C. United	4	1	1	2	6	7	−1	4	1.00
9	New York City FC	2	0	1	1	3	4	−1	1	0.50
10	St. Louis City SC	3	0	2	1	4	7	−3	2	0.67
11	Toronto FC	3	0	1	2	3	7	−4	1	0.33
12	Minnesota United FC	3	0	0	3	1	7	−6	0	0.00

Rules for classification: 1) points per game; 2) total wins per match played; 3) total goal differential per match played; 4) total goals scored per match played; 5) fewest disciplinary points per match played; 6) away goal differential per away match played; 7) away goals scored per away match played; 8) home goal differential per home match played; 9) home goals scored per home match played; 10) coin toss or drawing of lots.
