= Guachené =

Coordinates: 3°08′N 76°23′W

- Municipality and town
- Flag Coat of arms

- Location of the municipality and town of Guachené in the Cauca Department of Colombia.
- Country: Colombia
- Department: Cauca Department
- Time zone: UTC-5 (Colombia Standard Time)

Guachené is a town and municipality in the Cauca Department, Colombia. The city was officially founded on December 16, 2006.

== Sister Cities ==
- Prairie View, Texas, United States
