= O'Vonte Mullings =

Canadian soccer player (born 2000)

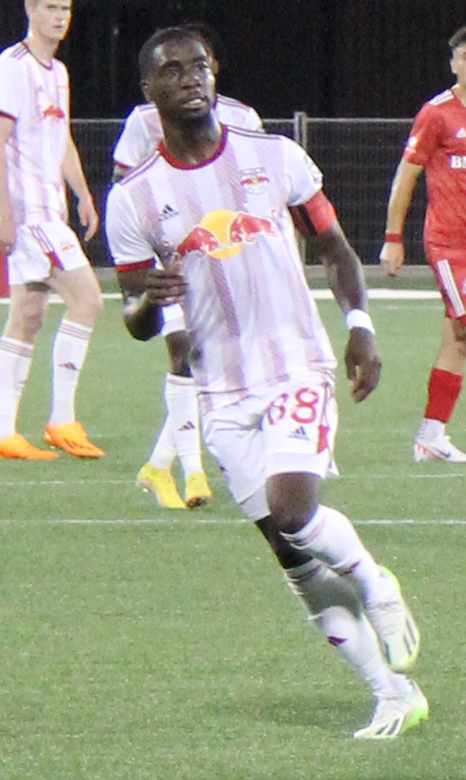
- Mullings with NY Red Bulls II in 2023

Personal information
- Date of birth: October 9, 2000 (age 26)
- Place of birth: Toronto, Ontario, Canada
- Height: 1.78 m (5 ft 10 in)
- Positions: Fullback; forward

Team information
- Current team: AB
- Number: 88

Youth career
- Mooredale SC
- North Toronto Nitros
- 2016–2018: FC Durham

College career
Years	Team	Apps	(Gls)
2018–2021	Florida Gulf Coast Eagles	57	(28)

Senior career*
Years	Team	Apps	(Gls)
2019	Seattle Sounders FC U-23	9	(3)
2022–2023	New York Red Bulls II	54	(5)
2023	→ New York Red Bulls (loan)	2	(0)
2024–	AB	76	(16)
- * Club domestic league appearances and goals as of July 31, 2026

O'Vonte Mullings (born October 9, 2000) is a Canadian soccer player who currently plays as a fullback for AB in the Danish 2nd Division.

== Early life ==
Mullings played youth soccer with Mooredale SC. He later played with the FC Durham Academy.

== College career ==
In November 2016, Mullings committed to attend the University of Vermont in the fall of 2018. However, he would later decommit from Vermont and instead committed to Florida Gulf Coast University, after Vermont coach Jesse Cormier left Vermont and was hired as the Florida Gulf Coast Eagles men's soccer head coach.

On August 26, 2018, Mullings scored his first collegiate goals, netting a brace in a 2-0 victory over the Presbyterian Blue Hose, subsequently earning Atlantic Sun Conference Player of the Week honours. At the end of his freshman season, he was named ASUN Freshman of the Year and was named to the All ASUN-Freshman Team, the ASUN All-Conference First Team, and the All-Atlantic Region Second Team. He was also named the school's Scholar-Athlete of the Month for January.

In his sophomore season, he recorded two braces, and earned back-to-back ASUN Player of the Week honours in October. At the end of the season, he was named an ASUN First Team All-Conference, the All-Atlantic Region Third Team, and the ASUN All-Tournament Team. At the end of the school year, he was named the school's co-Most Outstanding Athlete and was named to the ASUN All-Decade Team.

Ahead of his junior season, he was named the ASUN Preseason Player of the Year and was named to the Preseason All-Conference Team. On March 6, 2021, he scored a brace against the Jacksonville Dolphins, earning College Soccer News Team of the Week honours. At the end of the season, he was named ASUN Player of the Year and selected to the ASUN All-Conference First Team and the ASUN All-Tournament Team.

Ahead of his senior season, he was again named to the ASUN Preseason All-Conference team. After scoring back-to-back braces in mid-September, he again won ASUN Player of the Week honours. At the end of the season, he was once again named to the ASUN All-Conference First Team and was named to the All-Atlantic Region Second Team. He finished his time at FGCU with 28 goals and 63 points in 57 games, ranking second in the school's all-time goals and points totals.

== Club career ==
In 2019, Mullings played in USL League Two with Seattle Sounders FC U-23.

In January 2022, Mullings was selected in the first round (20th overall) of the 2022 MLS SuperDraft by the New York Red Bulls. In March 2022, he signed a contract with their second team, New York Red Bulls II, in the USL Championship. He made his professional debut on March 16, 2022, starting in a 1–0 win over Atlanta United 2 and was also named the team captain that season. On July 30, 2022, he featured for the first team in a friendly against Spanish club FC Barcelona. On August 9, 2022, Mullings scored his first professional goal, netting the winning goal for New York in a 2-1 victory over Atlanta United 2. In late August 2022, he was named to the USL Championship Team of the Week for the first time for Week 24 of the season. In February 2023, he re-signed with the second team, ahead of their debut season in MLS Next Pro. Mullings signed a short-term loan with the first team on May 17, 2023. He made his MLS debut the same day against Toronto FC, as a second-half substitution in a scoreless draw. He later signed an additional three short-terms loans in the remainder of the month, fulfilling his maximum of four. In August 2023, he was awarded the MLS Next Pro Goal of the Matchday for his goal on August 6 against New England Revolution II.

In February 2024, Mullins signed with Akademisk Boldklub in the third tier Danish 2nd Division.

== Career statistics ==
As of match played July 31, 2026

Appearances and goals by club, season and competition
Club	Season	League			Playoffs		National cup		Other		Total	
Club	Season	Division	Apps	Goals	Apps	Goals	Apps	Goals	Apps	Goals	Apps	Goals
Seattle Sounders U-23	2019	USL League Two	9	3	—		—		—		9	3
New York Red Bulls II	2022	USL Championship	31	1	—		—		—		31	1
New York Red Bulls II	2023	MLS Next Pro	23	4	2	1	—		—		25	5
New York Red Bulls II	Total		54	5	2	1	—		—		56	6
New York Red Bulls (loan)	2023	Major League Soccer	2	0	0	0	1	0	0	0	3	0
AB	2023-24	2nd Division	15	1	0	0	0	0	0	0	15	1
AB	2024-25	2nd Division	29	8	0	0	1	0	0	0	30	8
AB	2025-26	2nd Division	30	7	0	0	1	0	0	0	31	7
AB	2026–27	1st Division	2	0	0	0	0	0	0	0	2	0
AB	Total		76	16	0	0	2	0	0	0	78	16
Career total			141	24	2	1	2	0	0	0	145	25
