= Cameron Harper (soccer) =

American soccer player (born 2001)

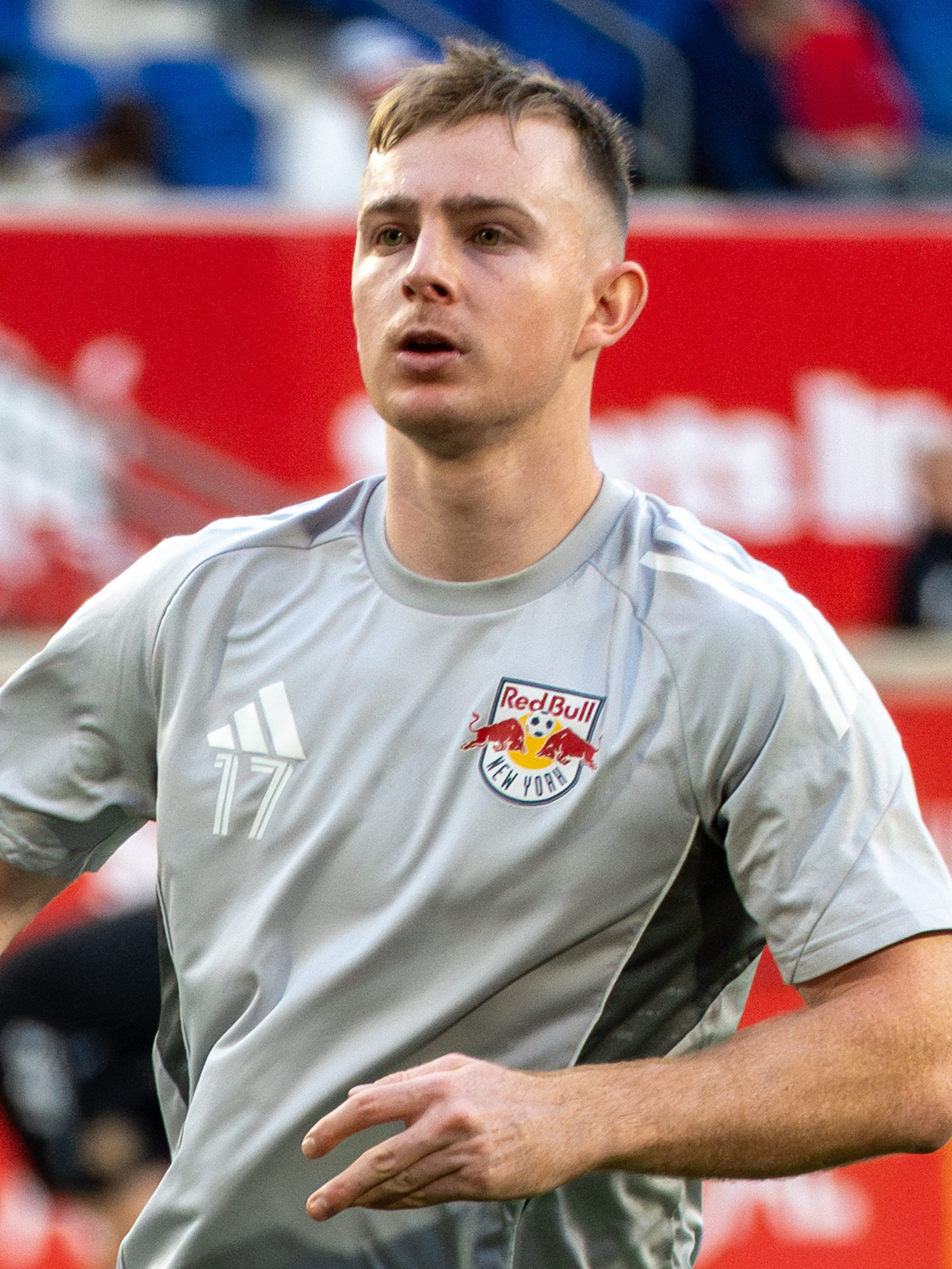
- Harper in 2025

Personal information
- Date of birth: November 19, 2001 (age 24)
- Place of birth: Sacramento, California, United States
- Height: 5 ft 9 in (1.75 m)
- Positions: Right-back; right winger

Team information
- Current team: New York Red Bulls
- Number: 17

Youth career
- 2015–2018: Pateadores SC
- 2018–2021: Celtic

Senior career*
Years	Team	Apps	(Gls)
2021	Celtic	1	(0)
2021–	New York Red Bulls	107	(13)
2021–	→ New York Red Bulls II (loan)	13	(1)

International career
2020	United States U20	3	(0)
- * Club domestic league appearances and goals as of November 15, 2026

Cameron Harper (born November 19, 2001) is an American professional soccer player who plays as right-winger or right-back for Major League Soccer club New York Red Bulls.

== Early life ==
Harper was born and raised in California to Scottish parents.

== Club career ==
=== Celtic ===
In September 2018, Harper signed with Scottish Premiership club Celtic after turning down a college scholarship from UCLA. After 13 players were ruled out of the first-team squad due to COVID protocols, Harper made his professional debut, appearing as a starter in a 1–1 draw against Hibernian on January 11, 2021.

=== New York Red Bulls ===
On March 5, 2021, it was announced that Harper joined Major League Soccer side New York Red Bulls on a transfer from Celtic. On April 25, 2021, he made his debut for New York, appearing as a second-half substitute in a 3–2 loss to the LA Galaxy.

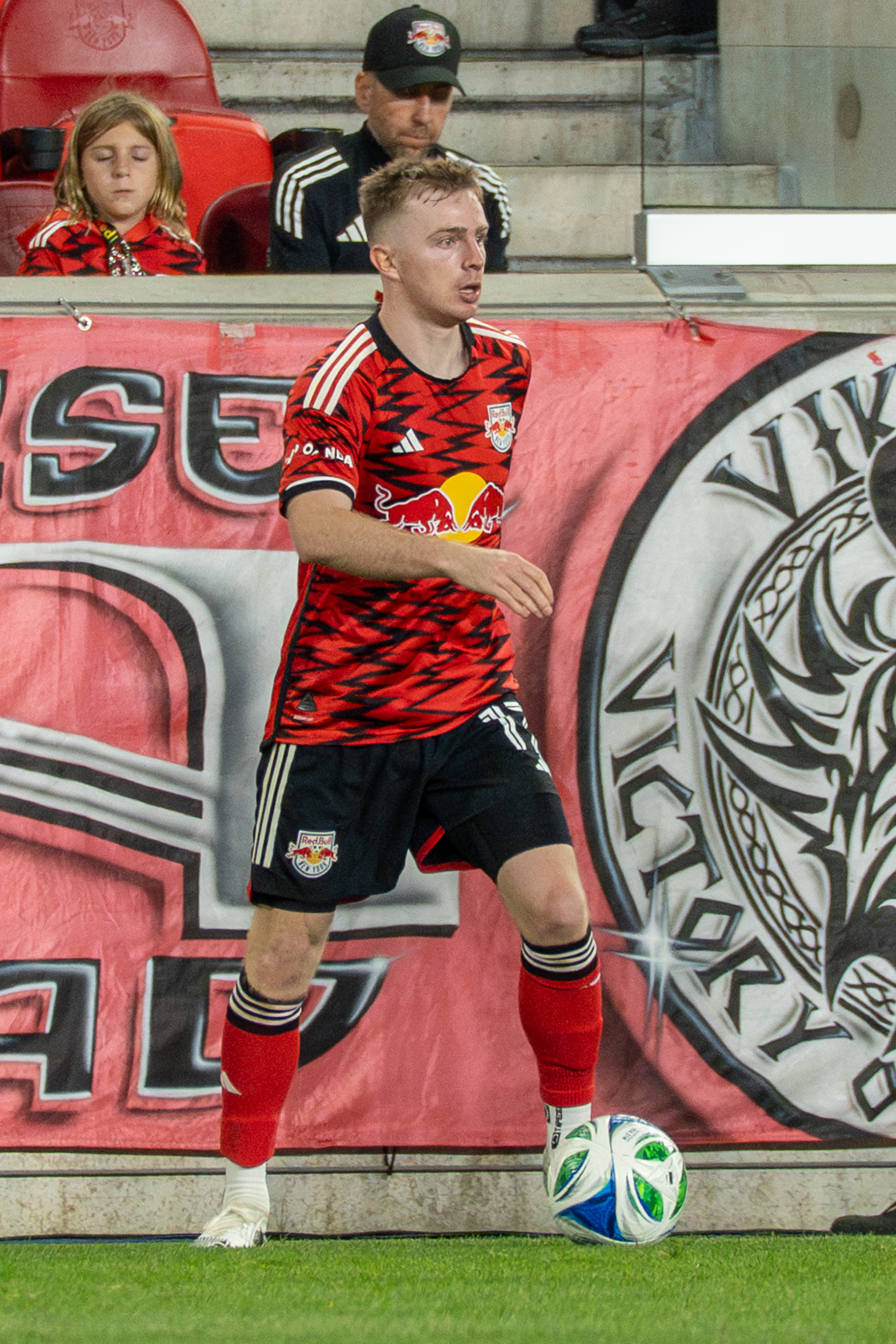
Cameron Harper during New York Red Bulls vs Atlanta United on May 31, 2025

On May 10, 2022, Harper made his first appearance of the season for New York, providing an assist to Zach Ryan in a 3–0 victory over D.C. United as the club advanced to Round of 16 in the 2022 U.S. Open Cup. A few days later, on May 14, Harper helped New York to a 1–1 draw on the road against Philadelphia Union, assisting Luquinhas on the equalizing goal. Harper started his first match for the club on May 18, 2022, and scored his first professional goal in a 3–3 draw with Chicago Fire FC. On July 24, 2022, Harper scored and assisted on the winning goal for New York in a 4–3 victory over Austin FC at Q2 Stadium.

During the 2023 season, Harper became a regular starter for New York at right-back. On June 23, 2023, he scored his first goal of the season in a 2–2 draw with Charlotte FC. During the 2024 season, new coach Sandro Schwarz played Harper mostly as a right-winger. On May 11, 2024, he scored his first goal of the season in a 4–2 victory over New England Revolution. A few days later, on 15 May, Harper scored the winning goal for New York in a 4–1 victory over Atlantic Cup rivals D.C. United.

== International career ==
Harper is eligible to represent the United States and Scotland internationally. In 2019, he was invited to youth national-team camps for both nations, but decided to represent the United States.

== Career statistics ==
As of match played October 31, 2026

Appearances and goals by club, season and competition
Club	Season	League			National cup (Note: Includes U.S. Open Cup)		League Cup/Playoffs		Continental		Other		Total	
Club	Season	Division	Apps	Goals	Apps	Goals	Apps	Goals	Apps	Goals	Apps	Goals	Apps	Goals
Celtic	2020–21	Scottish Premiership	1	0	—		—		—		—		1	0
New York Red Bulls	2021	Major League Soccer	7	0	—		—		—		—		7	0
New York Red Bulls	2022	Major League Soccer	17	2	3	0	—		—		—		20	2
New York Red Bulls	2023	Major League Soccer	31	2	2	0	3	0	—		4 (Note: Appearances in Leagues Cup)	0	40	2
New York Red Bulls	2024	Major League Soccer	27	5	—		5	0	—		—		32	5
New York Red Bulls	2025	Major League Soccer	12	3	1	0	0	0	0	0	0	0	13	3
New York Red Bulls	2026	Major League Soccer	13	1	0	0	—		—		—		13	1
New York Red Bulls	Total		107	13	6	0	8	0	0	0	4	0	125	13
New York Red Bulls II (loan)	2021	USL Championship	7	1	—		—		—		—		7	1
New York Red Bulls II (loan)	2022	USL Championship	2	0	—		—		—		—		2	0
New York Red Bulls II (loan)	2026	MLS Next Pro	4	0	—		0	0	—		—		4	0
New York Red Bulls II (loan)	Total		13	1	—		0	0	—		—		13	1
Career total			121	14	6	0	8	0	0	0	4	0	139	14
