= Matt Nocita =

American soccer player

Personal information
- Full name: Matthew Nocita
- Date of birth: April 24, 2000 (age 26)
- Place of birth: Porter Ranch, California, United States
- Height: 6 ft 8 in (2.03 m)
- Position: Defender

Youth career
- –2018: Real So Cal

College career
Years	Team	Apps	(Gls)
2018–2022	Navy Midshipmen	59	(6)

Senior career*
Years	Team	Apps	(Gls)
2022–2023	New York Red Bulls	1	(0)
2022–2023	New York Red Bulls II	23	(1)
- * Club domestic league appearances and goals as of January 31, 2025

Matthew Nocita (born April 24, 2000) is an American professional soccer player who last played as a defender for MLS side New York Red Bulls.

== Youth and college ==
Nocita attended Oaks Christian School, where alongside soccer he competed in track and field and lacrosse while in high school. Nocita earned Academic First Honors in 2015 and 2016, while garnering Academic Highest Honors in Fall 2016 and Head Masters List in Spring 2017. He also played club soccer for USSDA side Real So Cal. In December 2016, it was announced that Nocita had committed to attending the United States Naval Academy.

During his college career, Nocita made 59 appearances for the Midshipmen, scoring six goals and tallying two assists. He earned numerous accolades for the Navy during his time at college, been named a three-time Patriot League Defensive Player of the Year, 2021 FCAC Defensive Player of the Year, and a two-time CoSIDA Academic All-American.

== Professional ==
On January 11, 2022, Nocita was drafted by the New York Red Bulls as the 7th pick of the 2022 MLS SuperDraft, after they traded up twice to acquire the pick. Following his selection, Nocita was required to apply to delay his Navy service to allow him to play professional. On August 25, 2022, Nocita signed a contract with New York Red Bulls.
