= Tom Barlow (American soccer) =

American soccer player (born 1995)

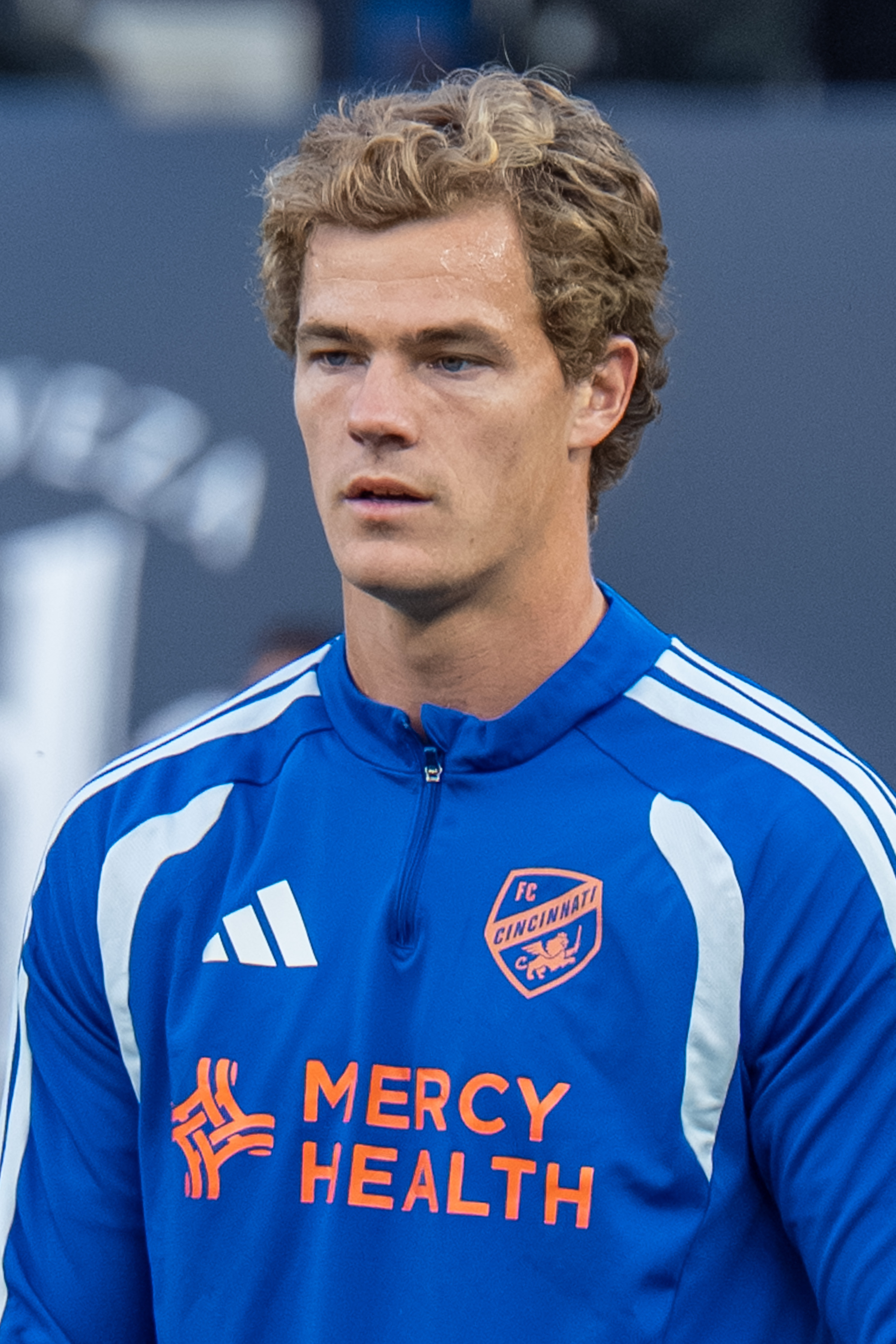
- Barlow with FC Cincinnati in 2026

Personal information
- Full name: Tom Barlow
- Date of birth: July 8, 1995 (age 31)
- Place of birth: St. Louis, Missouri, U.S.
- Height: 6 ft 2 in (1.88 m)
- Position: Forward

Team information
- Current team: FC Cincinnati
- Number: 16

College career
Years	Team	Apps	(Gls)
2014–2017	Wisconsin Badgers	78	(23)

Senior career*
Years	Team	Apps	(Gls)
2015	Reading United AC	13	(5)
2016	Des Moines Menace	11	(7)
2017	Chicago FC United	2	(0)
2018–2022	New York Red Bulls II	40	(19)
2019–2023	New York Red Bulls	123	(14)
2024–2025	Chicago Fire	50	(5)
2026–	FC Cincinnati	34	(10)
- * Club domestic league appearances and goals as of 03:01, November 9, 2026 (UTC)

Tom Barlow (born July 8, 1995) is an American professional soccer player who plays as a forward for Major League Soccer club FC Cincinnati.

== Career ==
=== Youth career ===
Barlow grew up in St. Louis, Missouri and attended Chaminade College Preparatory School. He played college soccer for four years at the University of Wisconsin, scoring 23 goals in 78 matches. He also played in the PDL with Reading United, Des Moines Menace and Chicago FC United. He scored his first goal in the Lamar Hunt U.S. Open Cup against the Pittsburgh Riverhounds on May 17, 2017, in a 3–1 upset victory by Chicago.

=== New York Red Bulls II ===
On January 19, 2018, Barlow was drafted in the second round of the 2018 MLS SuperDraft, by the New York Red Bulls. On March 15, 2018, he signed his first professional contract with New York Red Bulls II. On May 27, 2018, he scored his first goal for New York in a 4–1 victory over Indy Eleven. On August 25, 2018, Barlow recorded a second half hat-trick to help New York to a 4–4 draw with Charleston Battery after trailing 3–0 at halftime. On October 20, 2018, Barlow helped New York advance in the 2018 USL Playoffs, scoring the loan goal in a 1–0 victory over Charleston Battery.

On March 9, 2019, Barlow scored two goals in a 3–1 victory over Swope Park Rangers in the first match of the season. On July 10, 2019, he scored two goals to help New York to a 4–3 victory over Bethlehem Steel. He ended the season scoring 11 goals in 16 matches for the USL Championship squad in 2019.

=== New York Red Bulls ===
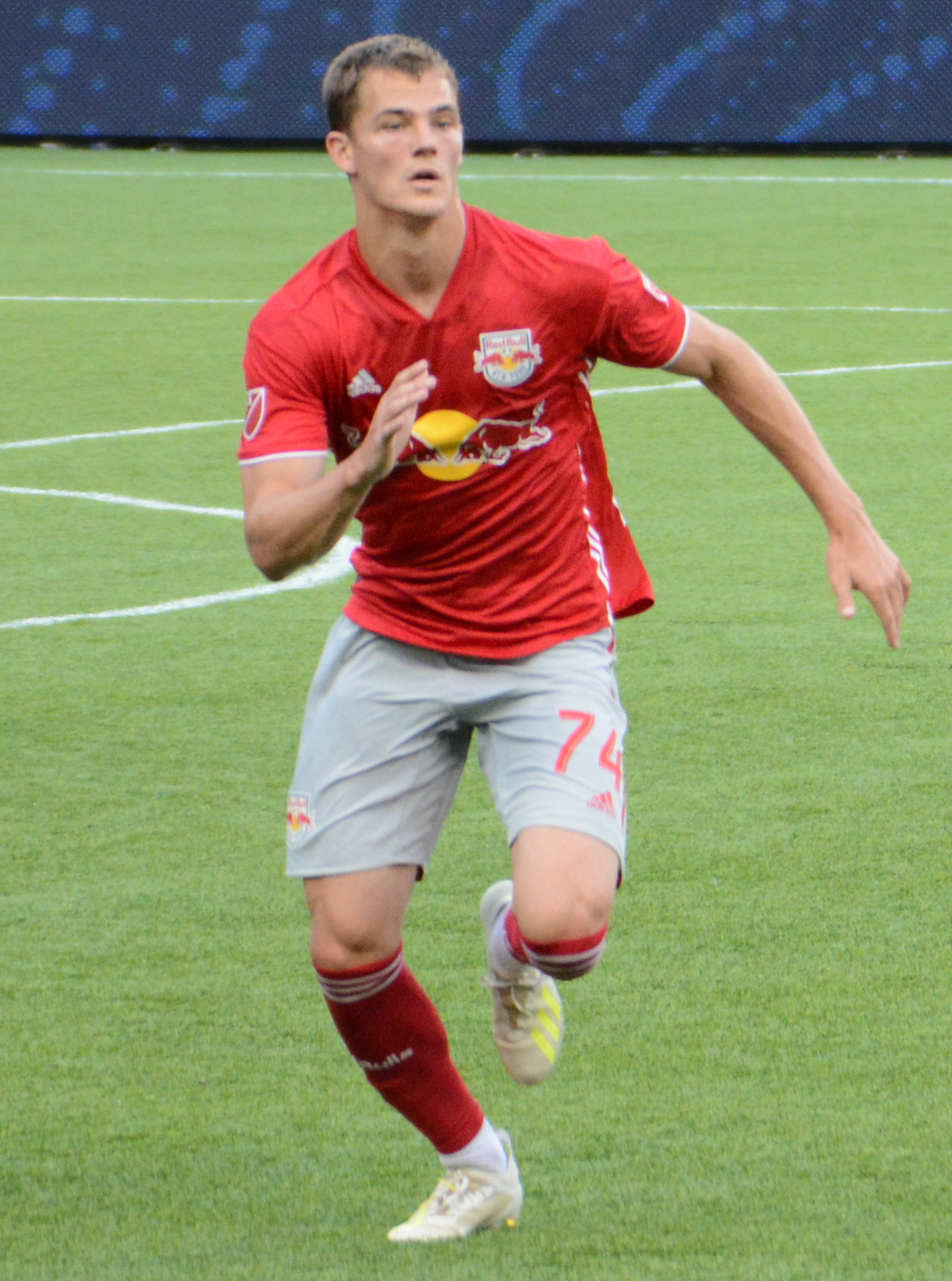
Barlow with the New York Red Bulls in 2019

On May 8, 2019, Barlow was signed to a first team contract with New York Red Bulls. On May 19, 2019. Barlow scored his first goal for the first team on his debut in a 1–0 victory over Atlanta United. With the Red Bulls down to ten men he scored his first career MLS goal against Brad Guzan. He ended his first season with the first team scoring 5 goals in 14 appearances.

On September 27, 2020, Barlow scored two goals in a 4–1 victory over Montreal Impact. On February 26, 2022, Barlow scored the third goal for New York in a 3–1 victory over San Jose Earthquakes in the opening match of the season. On May 25, 2022, Barlow scored in a 3–1 victory for New York over Charlotte FC as his team advanced to the quarterfinals of the 2022 U.S. Open Cup. On 24 July 2022, Barlow scored the winning goal for New York in a 4–3 victory over Austin FC at Q2 Stadium.

On April 8, 2023, Barlow scored an injury time equalizer to help New York to a 1–1 draw with San Jose Earthquakes. On May 31, 2023, Barlow scored the lone goal for New York in a 1–0 victory at Inter Miami. On October 7, 2023, Barlow scored the opening goal for New York in a 3–0 victory over Toronto FC, helping his club keep its playoff hopes alive. On October 25, 2023, Barlow scored for New York in a 5–2 victory over Charlotte FC, helping his club advance to the first round of the 2023 MLS Cup Playoffs.

== Career statistics ==
As of match played November 7, 2026

Club	Season	League			Playoffs		National cup (Note: Includes U.S. Open Cup)		Continental		Other		Total	
Club	Season	Division	Apps	Goals	Apps	Goals	Apps	Goals	Apps	Goals	Apps	Goals	Apps	Goals
Reading United	2015	PDL	13	5	—		—		—		—		13	5
Des Moines Menace	2016	PDL	11	7	2	0	—		—		—		13	7
Chicago FC United	2017	PDL	2	0	—		1	1	—		—		3	1
New York Red Bulls II	2018	USL	23	8	3	2	—		—		—		26	10
New York Red Bulls II	2019	USL Championship	15	11	1	0	—		—		—		16	11
New York Red Bulls II	2022	USL Championship	2	0	—		—		—		—		2	0
New York Red Bulls II	Total		40	19	4	2	—		—		—		44	21
New York Red Bulls	2019	MLS	12	3	1	1	1	1	—		—		14	5
New York Red Bulls	2020	MLS	21	3	1	0	—		—		—		22	3
New York Red Bulls	2021	MLS	23	1	—		—		—		—		23	1
New York Red Bulls	2022	MLS	33	4	—		5	1	—		—		38	5
New York Red Bulls	2023	MLS	34	3	3	2	2	0	—		4 (Note: Appearances in Leagues Cup)	0	43	5
New York Red Bulls	Total		123	14	5	3	8	2	—		4	0	140	19
Chicago Fire	2024	MLS	28	2	—		—		—		2	0	30	2
Chicago Fire	2025	MLS	22	3	2	0	3	0	—		—		27	3
Chicago Fire	Total		50	5	2	0	3	0	—		2	0	57	5
FC Cincinnati	2026	MLS	34	10	—		—		4 (Note: Appearances in CONCACAF Champions Cup)	3	3	0	41	13
Career total			273	60	13	5	12	3	4	3	9	0	311	71
