= Andrés Reyes (footballer, born 1999) =

Colombian footballer

Personal information
- Full name: Andrés Felipe Reyes Ambuila
- Date of birth: 8 September 1999 (age 27)
- Place of birth: Puerto Tejada, Colombia
- Height: 1.91 m (6 ft 3 in)
- Position: Defender

Team information
- Current team: Atlético Nacional

Youth career
- Atlético Nacional

Senior career*
Years	Team	Apps	(Gls)
2018–2021	Atlético Nacional	19	(1)
2020	→ Inter Miami (loan)	13	(0)
2021–2024	New York Red Bulls	83	(5)
2021–2022	New York Red Bulls II	4	(0)
2025–2026	San Diego FC	1	(0)
2026–	Atlético Nacional	0	(0)

International career^{‡}
2019	Colombia U20	11	(1)
2020	Colombia U23	1	(0)
2023–	Colombia	2	(1)
- * Club domestic league appearances and goals as of 22 October 2025 ‡ National team caps and goals as of 16 December 2023

Andrés Felipe Reyes Ambuila (born 8 September 1999) is a Colombian professional footballer who plays as a defender for Atlético Nacional.

== Club career ==
=== Atletico Nacional ===
Born in Puerto Tejada, Colombia, Reyes began his career in the youth ranks of his childhood club, Atlético Nacional. He quickly progressed and made his debut with the first team in a 2–0 loss against Once Caldas on 27 October 2018. He scored his first goal for the club in a 3–1 victory against Unión Magdalena in 2019.

==== Loan to Inter Miami ====
In February 2020, it was announced that Reyes had joined Inter Miami on a year long loan for their inaugural season. On 7 March 2020, Reyes made his debut for Miami, starting in a 2–1 defeat to D.C. United. Reyes missed a month of matches during the season after suffering a facial fracture against the Philadelphia Union. After appearing in 13 games in his first season, it was announced in December that the club would not be exercising his purchase option.

=== New York Red Bulls ===
On 19 January 2021, Reyes returned to Major League Soccer, signing with the New York Red Bulls. On 22 May 2021, Reyes made his debut for New York scoring the opening goal in a 3–1 loss to New England Revolution. In this match he also received two yellow cards, resulting in a first-half sending off. On 23 June 2021, Reyes scored his second goal of the season for New York in a 3–2 loss to New England Revolution. On 17 October 2021, Reyes assisted Cristian Cásseres Jr. as he scored the winning goal for Red Bulls in 1–0 victory in the Hudson River Derby over rival New York City FC.

Reyes began the 2023 season in fine form, cementing his place in the starting 11 for New York. On 11 March 2023, Reyes scored the equalizing goal for New York in a 1–1 draw at Minnesota United. On 20 May 2023, Reyes opened the scoring for New York in a 2–1 victory over CF Montréal.

On 29 May 2024, Reyes scored his first goal of the season for New York in a 3–1 victory over Charlotte FC. On 30 November 2024, Reyes headed in a set piece against Orlando City SC, sending the Red Bulls to MLS Cup 2024 in a 1–0 victory.

=== San Diego FC ===
On 12 December 2024, Reyes was acquired by expansion club San Diego FC in exchange for $800,000 in General Allocation Money divided across the 2025 and 2026 seasons with the New York Red Bulls retaining a sell-on fee.

=== Return to Atlético Nacional ===
On 8 August 2026, San Diego transferred Reyes to Atlético Nacional.

== International career ==
Reyes was an integral member of the Colombia U20 team during the 2019 FIFA U-20 World Cup; starting in all five of Colombia's matches during the tournament as they reached the quarter-finals. He scored Colombia's lone goal in a 1–1 draw against New Zealand in the Round of 16.

== Career statistics ==
=== Club ===
As of match played May 4, 2024

Appearances and goals by club, season and competition
Club	Season	League			National cup		League cup		International		Total	
Club	Season	Division	Apps	Goals	Apps	Goals	Apps	Goals	Apps	Goals	Apps	Goals
Atlético Nacional	2018	Categoría Primera A	1	0	0	0	0	0	0	0	1	0
Atlético Nacional	2019	Categoría Primera A	18	1	2	0	0	0	0	0	20	1
Atlético Nacional	Total		19	1	2	0	0	0	0	0	21	1
Inter Miami (loan)	2020	MLS	13	0	0	0	0	0	0	0	13	0
New York Red Bulls	2021	MLS	19	2	0	0	1	0	0	0	20	2
New York Red Bulls	2022	MLS	12	0	0	0	1	0	0	0	13	0
New York Red Bulls	2023	MLS	29	2	1	0	3	0	3	0	36	2
New York Red Bulls	2024	MLS	23	1	0	0	4	1	2	0	29	2
New York Red Bulls	Total		83	5	1	0	9	1	5	0	98	6
New York Red Bulls II (loan)	2021	USL Championship	2	0	—		—		—		2	0
New York Red Bulls II (loan)	2022	USL Championship	1	0	—		—		—		1	0
New York Red Bulls II (loan)	2024	MLS Next Pro	1	0	—		—		—		1	0
Career total			119	6	3	0	9	1	5	0	136	7

=== International ===
As of match played 17 December 2023

Appearances and goals by national team and year
National team	Year	Apps	Goals
Colombia	2023	2	1
Total		2	1

As of 16 December 2023

No.	Date	Venue	Opponent	Score	Final	Competition
1.	16 December 2023	Los Angeles Memorial Coliseum, Los Angeles, United States	Mexico	1–2	3–2	Friendly
