= 2026 CF Montréal season =

Canadian Major League Soccer team

CF Montréal
2026 season
- Owner: Joey Saputo
- Head coach: Marco Donadel (until April 12); Philippe Eullaffroy (interim, from April 12)
- Stadium: Saputo Stadium
- MLS Cup playoffs: Did not qualify
- Canadian Championship: Runners-up
- Top goalscorer: League: Prince Owusu (15); All: Prince Owusu (18)
Home colours	Away colours	Third colours

The 2026 CF Montréal season is the club's 33rd season of existence, and their 15th in Major League Soccer, the top tier of the American soccer pyramid.

In addition to competing in MLS, the club is also participating in the Canadian Championship.

== Current squad ==
As of September 18, 2026

No.	Player	Nationality	Position	Date of birth (age at year end)	Previous club
Goalkeepers
1	Sebastian Breza	CAN	GK	March 15, 1998 (age 28)	(Italy) Bologna
31	Thomas Gillier	CHI	GK	May 28, 2004 (age 22)	(Italy) Bologna
33	Emil Gazdov	CAN	GK	September 11, 2003 (age 23)	(Canada) Pacific FC
41	Samsy Keita	CAN	GK	July 27, 2009 (age 17)	(Canada) Montreal Impact Academy
Defenders
2	Jalen Neal	USA	CB	August 24, 2003 (age 23)	(United States) LA Galaxy
3	Brayan Ceballos	COL	CB	May 24, 2001 (age 25)	(United States) New England Revolution
4	Brayan Vera	COL	CB	January 15, 1999 (age 27)	(United States) Real Salt Lake
5	Brandan Craig	USA	DF	April 7, 2004 (age 22)	(United States) Philadelphia Union
13	Luca Petrasso	CAN	DF	June 16, 2000 (age 26)	(Italy) US Triestina Calcio 1918
19	Bode Hidalgo	USA	FB	February 22, 2002 (age 24)	(United States) Real Salt Lake
24	Efrain Morales	BOL	CB	March 4, 2004 (age 22)	(United States) Atlanta United FC
27	Dawid Bugaj	POL	RB	July 9, 2004 (age 22)	(Italy) SPAL
28	Viktor Radojević	SER	FB	July 14, 2004 (age 22)	(United States) Chicago Fire FC
36	Josh-Duc Nteziryayo	CAN	FB	November 15, 2008 (age 17)	(Canada) Montreal Impact Academy
Midfielders
6	Samuel Piette	CAN	DM	November 12, 1994 (age 31)	(Spain) CD Izarra
7	Daniel Pereira	VEN	MF	July 14, 2000 (age 26)	(United States) Austin FC
8	Matty Longstaff	ENG	MF	March 21, 2000 (age 26)	(Canada) Toronto FC
16	Wikelman Carmona	VEN	AM	February 24, 2003 (age 23)	(United States) New York Red Bulls
17	Dante Sealy	TRI	DF	April 17, 2003 (age 23)	(United States) Colorado Rapids
18	Hennadiy Synchuk	UKR	MF	July 10, 2006 (age 20)	(Ukraine) FC Metalist Kharkiv
21	Fabian Herbers	GER	CM	August 17, 1993 (age 33)	(United States) Chicago Fire FC
22	Victor Loturi	CAN	CM	May 21, 2001 (age 25)	(Scotland) Ross County F.C.
25	Frankie Amaya	USA	AM	September 26, 2000 (age 26)	(Mexico) Deportivo Toluca F.C.
26	Ivan Losenko	UKR	MF	July 21, 2004 (age 22)	(Ukraine) FC Shakhtar Donetsk
29	Olger Escobar	GUA	AM	September 11, 2006 (age 20)	(United States) New England Revolution II
Attackers
9	Prince Owusu	GHA	FW	January 7, 1997 (age 29)	(Canada) Toronto FC
10	Alexis Sánchez	CHI	FW	December 19, 1988 (age 37)	(Spain) Sevilla FC
14	Daniel Ríos	MEX	FW	February 22, 1995 (age 31)	(Canada) Vancouver Whitecaps FC
23	Noah Streit	SUI	FW	October 11, 2005 (age 21)	(Switzerland) FC Basel

=== International roster slots ===
Montreal currently has seven MLS International Roster Slots for use in the 2026 season. They traded two, one to Inter Miami CF and one to Los Angeles FC. In addition, starting in 2022, CF Montréal were allowed to make three international players exempt from status if they have been on the roster for more than one year.

CF Montréal International slots
Slot	Player	Nationality
Exempt	Prince Owusu	Ghana
Exempt	Hennadiy Synchuk	Ukraine
Exempt	Dawid Bugaj	Poland
1	Thomas Gillier	Chile
2	Noah Streit	Switzerland
3	Ivan Losenko	Ukraine
4	Matty Longstaff	England
5	Brayan Ceballos	Colombia
6	Alexis Sánchez	Chile
7	Viktor Radojević	Serbia

Foreign-Born Players with Domestic Status
Player	Nationality
Olger Escobar	Guatemala / (United States) USA
Efrain Morales	Bolivia / (United States) USA
Aleksandr Guboglo	Haiti / Canada
Fabian Herbers	Germany ^{G}
Dante Sealy	(Trinidad and Tobago) Trinidad & Tobago / (United States) USA
Brayan Vera	Colombia ^{G}
Daniel Ríos	Mexico ^{G}
Daniel Pereira	Venezuela ^{G}
Wikelman Carmona	Venezuela ^{G}

- (Canada) – Player is Canadian citizen;
- (United States) – Player is US citizen;
- G – Player has US green card;
- C – Player has permanent Canadian residency.

== Management ==
As of January 14, 2026

- (Canada) Joey Saputo – owner
- (Canada) Luca Saputo – managing director, recruitment and sporting methodology
- (Canada) Simone Saputo – managing director, academy strategy and roster management
- (Canada) Gabriel Gervais – president and chief executive officer
- (Canada) Eric Nadeau – vice-president & chief revenue officer
- (Canada) Amélie Vaillancourt – vice-president and chief human resource officer
- (Canada) Samia Chebeir – vice-president and chief marketing officer
- (Canada) Daniel Pozzi – Director Soccer Operations & Roster Compliance

== Coaching staff ==
As of June 11, 2026

- (France) Philippe Eullaffroy– Caretaker manager
- (Canada) Serge Dinkota – Assistant Coach
- (Canada) Sylvain Hascoët – Assistant Coach
- (Italy) Vincenzo Benvenuto – Goalkeeper Coach
- (England) Elliott Jealous – Video Analyst
- (Italy) Stefano Pasquali – Performance Coach
- (England) Paul Bower – Physical Performance Coach
- (Canada) Dhia Amara – Strength and Conditioning Coach

== Player movement ==
=== In ===
Per Major League Soccer and club policies terms of the deals do not get disclosed.

No.	Pos.	Player	Transferred from	Fee/notes	Date	Source
37	DF	(Canada) Félix Samson	(Canada) Montreal Impact Academy	Sign to a Home Grown Contract	November 24, 2025	
17	DF	(Iceland) Dagur Dan Þórhallsson	(United States) Orlando City SC	Traded for $500,000 in GAM	December 10, 2025	
4	DF	(Colombia) Brayan Vera	(United States) Real Salt Lake	Traded for $1,200,000 in GAM	December 10, 2025	
36	DF	(Canada) Josh-Duc Nteziryayo	(Canada) Montreal Impact Academy	Sign to a Home Grown Contract	December 15, 2025	
14	FW	(Mexico) Daniel Ríos	(Canada) Vancouver Whitecaps FC	Free Agent	January 9, 2026	
41	GK	(Canada) Samsy Keita	(Canada) Montreal Impact Academy	Sign to a Home Grown Contract	February 6, 2026	
16	MF	(Venezuela) Wikelman Carmona	(United States) New York Red Bulls	Traded for Jahkeele Marshall-Rutty	February 9, 2026	
23	FW	(Switzerland) Noah Streit	(Switzerland) FC Basel	Transfer Fee	February 9, 2026	
3	DF	(Colombia) Brayan Ceballos	(United States) New England Revolution	Traded for $750,000 in GAM	July 24, 2026	
10	FW	(Chile) Alexis Sánchez	(Spain) Sevilla FC	Free Transfer	August 11, 2026	
17	MF	(Trinidad and Tobago) Dante Sealy	(United States) Colorado Rapids	Traded for $1,400,000 in GAM	August 28, 2026	

=== Out ===
No.	Pos.	Player	Transferred to	Fee/notes	Date	Source
3	DF	(England) Tom Pearce	(England) Chesterfield F.C.	Contract Buyout	October 20, 2025	
4	DF	(Colombia) Fernando Álvarez	(Colombia) Deportivo Cali	Option declined	October 20, 2025	
10	MF	(United States) Bryce Duke	(United States) San Diego FC	Option declined	October 20, 2025	
17	FW	(Albania) Giacomo Vrioni	(Italy) Cesena FC	Option declined	October 20, 2025	
38	MF	(Canada) Alessandro Biello	(Canada) FC Supra du Québec	Option declined	November 7, 2025	
9	FW	(Uruguay) Matías Cóccaro	(Argentina) Newell's Old Boys	Contract Buyout	December 22, 2025	
25	DF	(Trinidad and Tobago) Dante Sealy	(United States) Colorado Rapids	Transferred for $1,900,000 in GAM	December 23, 2025	
40	GK	(Canada) Jonathan Sirois	(United States) FC Dallas	Transferred for $350,000 in GAM	February 2, 2026	
11	DF	(Canada) Jahkeele Marshall-Rutty	(United States) New York Red Bulls	Traded for Wikelman Carmona	February 9, 2026	
7	FW	(Ghana) Kwadwo Opoku	(Greece) Panetolikos F.C.	Transfer Fee	June 29, 2026	
28	FW	(Nigeria) Sunusi Ibrahim		Released	June 30, 2026	
17	DF	(Iceland) Dagur Dan Þórhallsson	(United States) San Diego FC	Transferred for $500,000 in GAM	July 24, 2026	

=== Loans in ===
No.	Pos.	Player	Loaned from	Loan start date	Loan end date	Source
31	GK	(Chile) Thomas Gillier	(Italy) Bologna	July 8, 2025	December 31, 2026	
10	MF	(Spain) Iván Jaime	(Portugal) FC Porto	August 22, 2025	June 30, 2026	
26	MF	(Ukraine) Ivan Losenko	(Ukraine) FC Shakhtar Donetsk	December 30, 2025	December 31, 2026	
3	DF	(Argentina) Tomás Avilés	(United States) Inter Miami CF	January 23, 2026	July 18, 2026	
25	MF	(United States) Frankie Amaya	(Mexico) Deportivo Toluca F.C.	April 2, 2026	December 31, 2026	
28	DF	(Serbia) Viktor Radojević	(United States) Chicago Fire FC	September 2, 2026	December 31, 2026	

=== Loans out ===
No.	Pos.	Player	Loaned to	Loan start date	Loan end date	Source
33	GK	(Canada) Emil Gazdov	(Germany) FC St. Pauli	December 31, 2025	June 30, 2026	
37	DF	(Canada) Félix Samson	(United States) FC Cincinnati	January 6, 2026	December 31, 2026	
39	DF	(Canada) Aleksandr Guboglo	(France) Stade de Reims	July 23, 2026	June 30, 2027	
35	FW	(Canada) Owen Graham-Roache	(Canada) Cavalry FC	September 17, 2026	December 31, 2026	

=== MLS SuperDraft picks ===
Round	No.	Pos.	Player	College/Club team	Transaction	Source
2	46	MF	(United States) Aidan Godinho	Georgetown Hoyas		
3	63	FW	(United States) Tate Lorentz	Wake Forest Demon Deacons		

== Friendlies ==
=== Pre-season ===
==== Matches ====
Win Draw Loss

January 23 1	FC Slovan Liberec	3–2	CF Montréal	Marbella, Spain
6:00 AM EST	Stránský 7'; Mahmić 61'; Krollis 86'	Report	Synchuk 43'; Ibrahim 73'	Stadium: Estadio Municipal de Marbella

January 29 2	FC Metalist 1925 Kharkiv	3–2	CF Montréal	Marbella, Spain
9:00 AM EST	Zabërgja 22'; Kalitvintsev 43'; Mba 117'	Report	Owusu 34'; Shabanov 95' OG	Stadium: Estadio Municipal de Marbella

February 7 3	New England Revolution	1–2	CF Montréal	Bradenton, FL
4:00 PM EST	Fry 103'	Report	Owusu 24'; Þórhallsson 32'	Stadium: IMG Academy

February 10 4	Philadelphia Union	2–4	CF Montréal	St. Petersburg, FL
6:00 PM EST	Iloski 28' 38'		Ríos 45'; Carmona 49'; Escobar 66'; Owusu 85'	Stadium: Al Lang Stadium

February 14 5	Tampa Bay Rowdies	2–2	CF Montréal	St. Petersburg, FL
6:00 PM EST	Henderlong 35'; Cicerone 71' (p)		Jaime 104'; Ríos 120'	Stadium: Al Lang Stadium

== Major League Soccer regular season ==
=== Tables ===
==== Eastern Conference ====
MLS Eastern Conference table (2026)
Pos	Team	Pld	W	L	T	GF	GA	GD	Pts
11	New York City FC	34	10	12	12	49	45	+4	42
12	Toronto FC	34	9	13	12	52	67	−15	39
13	Atlanta United FC	34	9	19	6	43	60	−17	33
14	D.C. United	34	7	15	12	39	61	−22	33
15	CF Montréal	34	6	20	8	37	69	−32	26

Source: MLS
Rules for classification: 1) points; 2) total wins; 3) total goal differential; 4) total goals scored; 5) fewer disciplinary points; 6) away goal differential; 7) away goals scored; 8) home goals differential; 9) home goals scored; 10) coin toss (2 clubs tied) or drawing of lots (≥3 clubs tied)

==== Overall ====
Overall MLS standings table
Pos	Team	Pld	W	L	T	GF	GA	GD	Pts
26	Austin FC	34	8	16	10	42	65	−23	34
27	Atlanta United FC	34	9	19	6	43	60	−17	33
28	D.C. United	34	7	15	12	39	61	−22	33
29	Sporting Kansas City	34	7	22	5	40	81	−41	26
30	CF Montréal	34	6	20	8	37	69	−32	26

Source: MLS
Rules for classification: 1) points; 2) total wins; 3) total goal differential; 4) total goals scored; 5) fewer disciplinary points; 6) away goal differential; 7) away goals scored; 8) home goals differential; 9) home goals scored; 10) coin toss (2 clubs tied) or drawing of lots (≥3 clubs tied)

=== Matches ===
Win Draw Loss

February 21 1	San Diego FC	5–0	CF Montréal	San Diego, CA
10:30 PM EST	McVey 14', (yellow card) 62'; Pellegrino 45+2'; Valakari 53'; Ingvartsen 59'; Zamblé 85'	Report	Loturi (yellow card) 5'; Avilés (red card) 50'	Stadium: Snapdragon Stadium; Attendance: 25,412; Referee: Joe Dickerson

February 28 2	Chicago Fire FC	3–0	CF Montréal	Chicago, IL
2:30 PM EST	Bamba 27'; Zinckernagel (yellow card) 44'; Dean (red card) 56'; Cuypers 90+4' (pen.); Lod 90+10'	Report	Vera (yellow card) 30'; Jaime (yellow card) 53'; Gillier (yellow card) 90+2'	Stadium: Soldier Field; Attendance: 20,872; Referee: Elijio Arreguin

March 8 3	New York Red Bulls	0–3	CF Montréal	Harrison, NJ
4:30 PM EDT	Che (yellow card) 50'	Report	Owusu 8' (pen.); Carmona 44', 68'	Stadium: Sports Illustrated Stadium; Attendance: 16,847; Referee: Sergii Boiko

March 14 4	Orlando City SC	2–1	CF Montréal	Orlando, FL
7:30 PM EDT	McGuire 19'; M. Ojeda 31'; Atuesta (yellow card) 33'	Report	Owusu 24'	Stadium: Inter&Co Stadium; Attendance: 18,035; Referee: Jair Marrufo

March 21 5	FC Cincinnati	4–3	CF Montréal	Cincinnati, OH
7:30 PM EDT	Echenique 40'; Jabbari 52'; Robinson (red card) 60'; Miazga (yellow card) 62'; Nwobodo (yellow card) 67'; Barlow 80'; Hadebe (yellow card) 83'; Denkey 90+4', (yellow card) 90+5'	Report	Carmona 6'; Owusu 45', 64' (pen.); Synchuk (yellow card) 47'	Stadium: TQL Stadium; Attendance: 25,513; Referee: Filip Dujic

April 4 6	New England Revolution	3–0	CF Montréal	Foxborough, MA
4:30 PM EDT	Langoni 6'; Raines (yellow card) 27'; Sands (yellow card) 33'; Fofana 77'; Miller 90+4'	Report	Synchuk (yellow card) 53'; Carmona (yellow card) 65'; Craig (yellow card) 69'	Stadium: Gillette Stadium; Attendance: 19,461; Referee: Joshua Encarnación

April 11 7	CF Montréal	1–2	Philadelphia Union	Montreal, QC
2:30 PM EDT	Gillier (yellow card) 22'; Jaime 23'; Owusu (yellow card) 37'; Loturi (yellow card) 43'	Report	Sery Larsen (yellow card) 45+6', (goal) 55'; Makhanya (yellow card) 59'; Bueno 70'; Damiani (yellow card) 85'; Lukić (yellow card) 90+6'	Stadium: Saputo Stadium; Attendance: 14,028; Referee: Alexis Da Silva

April 18 8	CF Montréal	4–1	New York Red Bulls	Montreal, QC
2:30 PM EDT	Loturi 5'; Owusu 39' (pen.); Longstaff 49', (yellow card) 89'; Vera (yellow card) 71'; Gillier (yellow card) 75'; Opoku 77'	Report	Mehmeti (yellow card) 34'; Ruvalcaba (yellow card) 43'; Longstaff 53' (o.g.); Donkor (yellow card) 83'	Stadium: Saputo Stadium; Attendance: 12,568; Referee: Sergii Demianchuk

April 25 9	CF Montréal	1–0	New York City FC	Montreal, QC
2:30 PM EDT	Owusu 18'; Piette (yellow card) 63'; Escobar (yellow card) 81'; Vera (yellow card) 84'; Longstaff (yellow card) 87'; Bugaj (yellow card) 88'	Report	Gray (yellow card) 74' (yellow-red card) 78'; Fernández (yellow card) 81'; Trewin (yellow card) 90+1'	Stadium: Saputo Stadium; Attendance: 14,015; Referee: Ramy Touchan

May 2 10	Atlanta United FC	3–1	CF Montréal	Atlanta, GA
7:30 PM EDT	Latte Lath (yellow card) 4', (goal) 45+6'; Lobjanidze 41', 50'; Hoyos (yellow card) 78'; Mihaj (yellow card) 90+2'; Jacob (yellow card) 90+5'	Report	Longstaff 6'; Piette (yellow card) 20'; Owusu (yellow card) 44'; Vera (red card) 90+1'; Ríos (yellow card) 90+2'	Stadium: Mercedes-Benz Stadium; Attendance: 34,703; Referee: Rubiel Vazquez

May 9 11	CF Montréal	2–0	Orlando City SC	Montreal, QC
4:30 PM EDT	Ríos 90+4' (pen.); Thórhallsson 90+8'	Report	Atuesta (yellow card) 62'; da Silva Nogueira (yellow card) 90+6'	Stadium: Saputo Stadium; Attendance: 14,044; Referee: Marcos de Oliveira

May 13 12	CF Montréal	2–2	Portland Timbers	Montreal, QC
7:30 PM EDT	Ríos 11', (yellow card) 90+3'; Carmona 45'; Neal (yellow card) 68'; Owusu (yellow card) 77'; Longstaff (yellow card) 81'	Report	Kelsy 21'; Bassett 77', (yellow card) 83'	Stadium: Saputo Stadium; Attendance: 12,251; Referee: Allen Chapman

May 16 13	CF Montréal	0–2	Chicago Fire FC	Montreal, QC
4:30 PM EDT	Piette (yellow card) 36'; Craig (yellow card) 63'; Owusu (yellow card) 72'; Vera (yellow card) 82'	Report	Radojević (yellow card) 6'; Zinckernagel 14'; Mbokazi (yellow card) 57'; Cuypers 67'; Dithejane (yellow card) 89'	Stadium: Saputo Stadium; Attendance: 16,018; Referee: Fotis Bazakos

May 23 14	D.C. United	4–4	CF Montréal	Washington, D.C.
7:30 PM EDT	Munteanu 28'; Stroud 31'; Baribo 51' (pen.); Servania (yellow card) 61'; Bartlett 87', (yellow card) 90+10'	Report	Escobar (yellow card) 31'; Owusu 45+1', 61', 90+4' (pen.), (yellow card) 90+10'; Ríos (yellow card) 61'; Synchuk 90+6'; Loturi (yellow card) 90+7'; Longstaff (yellow card) 90+11'	Stadium: Audi Field; Attendance: 19,215; Referee: Filip Dujic

July 16 15	CF Montréal	0–0	Toronto FC	Montreal, QC
7:30 PM EDT	Pereira (yellow card) 64'	Report	Sallói (yellow card) 69'	Stadium: Saputo Stadium; Attendance: 17,707; Referee: Guido Gonzales Jr.

July 22 16	Nashville SC	1–0	CF Montréal	Nashville, TN
8:30 PM EDT	Surridge 68' (pen.), (yellow card) 86'	Report	Owusu (yellow card) 90+7'	Stadium: Geodis Park; Attendance: 25,490; Referee: Marcos de Oliveira

July 25 17	CF Montréal	0–1	Inter Miami CF	Montreal, QC
7:30 PM EDT		Report	Fray (yellow card) 23'; Suárez 81' (pen.); Segovia (yellow card) 84'	Stadium: Saputo Stadium; Attendance: 19,619; Referee: Alexis Da Silva

August 1 18	CF Montréal	2–2	New England Revolution	Montreal, QC
7:30 PM EDT	Breza (yellow card) 36'; Vera 52'; Owusu 59'	Report	Gil 30' (pen.); Turgeman 36'	Stadium: Saputo Stadium; Attendance: 15,082; Referee: Jair Marrufo

August 15 19	CF Montréal	1–1	D.C. United	Montreal, QC
7:30 PM EDT	Owusu 50' (pen.); Petrasso (yellow card) 63'	Report	Hopkins (yellow card) 20'; Kurokawa (yellow card) 50'; Baribo 67'	Stadium: Saputo Stadium; Attendance: 15,309; Referee: Pierre-Luc Lauziere

August 19 20	Columbus Crew	1–2	CF Montréal	Columbus, OH
7:30 PM EDT	Camacho (yellow card) 3'; Gillier 20' (o.g.); Gomes (yellow card) 34'	Report	Owusu 5'; Vera (yellow card) 14'; Neal (yellow card) 48'; Ceballos (yellow card) 74'; Streit 78'; Longstaff (yellow card) 89'	Stadium: ScottsMiracle-Gro Field; Attendance: 17,039; Referee: Malik Badawi

August 22 21	CF Montréal	2–2	LA Galaxy	Montreal, QC
7:30 PM EDT	Ríos 16'; Craig (yellow card) 67'; Owusu 79'; Ceballos (yellow card) 90+1'	Report	Ramos Jr. 19'; Yoshida 48'; Marcinkowski (red card) 68'	Stadium: Saputo Stadium; Attendance: 19,619; Referee: Lorenzo Hernandez

August 29 22	Inter Miami CF	7–1	CF Montréal	Miami, FL
7:30 PM EDT	Fray (yellow card) 11'; Casemiro 20'; Petrasso 40' (o.g.); Messi 52', 83', 90+6'; Suárez 80'; Shaw 89'	Report	Herbers (yellow card) 35', (goal) 37'; Streit (yellow card) 39'	Stadium: Nu Stadium; Attendance: 26,066; Referee: Elijio Arreguin

September 5 23	Philadelphia Union	2–0	CF Montréal	Chester, PA
7:30 PM EDT	Lukić (yellow card) 6'; Damiani (yellow card) 24'; Jacques 57'; Wagner (yellow card) 68'; C. Sullivan 75'; Bueno (yellow card) 90'	Report	Synchuk (yellow card) 14'; Piette (yellow card) 29'; Bugaj (yellow card) 56'; Owusu (penalty missed) 68'; Loturi (yellow card) 73'	Stadium: Subaru Park; Attendance: 18,774; Referee: Chris Penso

September 9 24	CF Montréal	1–2	Charlotte FC	Montreal, QC
7:30 PM EDT	Ríos 34'; Loturi (yellow card) 45+4'; Longstaff (yellow card) 81'	Report	Abada 37'; Schnegg (yellow card) 67'; Toklomati 81'	Stadium: Saputo Stadium; Attendance: 12,324; Referee: Rubiel Vazquez

September 12 25	Colorado Rapids	1–0	CF Montréal	Commerce City, CO
9:30 PM EDT	Aaronson 43' (pen.); Thompson (yellow card) 85'; Frederick (yellow card) 90'	Report	Sealy (yellow card) 81'	Stadium: Dick's Sporting Goods Park; Attendance: 15,091; Referee: Drew Fischer

September 19 26	CF Montréal	0–2	Columbus Crew	Montreal, QC
7:30 PM EDT	Ceballos (yellow card) 2'; Piette (yellow card) 84'	Report	Moreira (yellow card) 32'; Farsi 57'; Méndez 68'	Stadium: Saputo Stadium; Attendance: 14,696; Referee: Fotis Bazakos

September 26 27	CF Montréal	3–1	FC Cincinnati	Montreal, QC
7:30 PM EDT	Ríos 25'; Longstaff (yellow card) 33'; Herbers (yellow card) 47'; Owusu 72' (pen.), 75'	Report	Barlow 64'; Celentano (yellow card) 71'; Hadebe (yellow card) 85'	Stadium: Saputo Stadium; Attendance: 13,723; Referee: Ismail Elfath

October 10 28	Toronto FC	2–1	CF Montréal	Toronto, ON
1:00 PM EDT	Morgan 90+3'; Mihailovic 90+5'; Laryea (yellow card) 90+6'	Report	Ríos 51'; Vera (yellow card) 55'; Craig (yellow card) 84'; Petrasso (yellow card) 87'	Stadium: BMO Field; Attendance: 21,572; Referee: Allen Chapman

October 14 29	CF Montréal	0–3	Atlanta United FC	Montreal, QC
7:30 PM EDT	Escobar (yellow card) 83'	Report	Almirón 22'; Galoppo 41'; Hoyos (yellow card) 58'; Embolo 60'; Picault (yellow card) 90+1'	Stadium: Saputo Stadium; Attendance: 12,022; Referee: Pierre-Luc Lauziere

October 17 30	Seattle Sounders FC	1–1	CF Montréal	Seattle, WA
10:30 PM EDT	Dotson (yellow card) 14'; Gomez 66'	Report	Synchuk 13'; Alexis (yellow card) 33'; Loturi (yellow card) 52'	Stadium: Lumen Field; Attendance: 33,007; Referee: Fotis Bazakos

October 24 31	CF Montréal	0–2	Nashville SC	Montreal, QC
1:30 PM EDT	Pereira (yellow card) 13'; Radojević (yellow card) 48'	Report	Surridge 51'; Saad (yellow card) 65'; Palacios (yellow card) 70'; Keita 76' (o.g.)	Stadium: Saputo Stadium; Attendance: 13,016; Referee: Lukasz Szpala

October 28 32	Charlotte FC	4–0	CF Montréal	Charlotte, NC
7:30 PM EDT	Toklomati 7'; Abada 67', 79', 83'	Report	Morales (yellow card) 64'; Pereira (yellow card) 86'; Herbers (yellow card) 90+2'	Stadium: Bank of America Stadium; Attendance: 24,448; Referee: Ricardo Fierro

October 31 33	New York City FC	1–1	CF Montréal	New York, NY
2:00 PM EDT	O'Toole (yellow card) 23'; Perea 41'; Shore (yellow card) 52'; Talles Magno (yellow card) 56'	Report	Sánchez (yellow card) 29'; Pereira (yellow card) 38'; Escobar (yellow card) 47'; Radojević (yellow card) 73'; Herbers (yellow card) 90'; Ríos 90+1'	Stadium: Yankee Stadium; Attendance: 17,522; Referee: Timothy Ford

November 7 34	CF Montréal	0–2	Vancouver Whitecaps FC	Montreal, QC
4:00 PM EST	Loturi (yellow card) 45'; Petrasso (yellow card) 74'	Report	Gherasimencov (yellow card) 26', (goal) 83'; Ocampo (yellow card) 42'; Sabaly 50'; Priso (yellow card) 63'	Stadium: Saputo Stadium; Attendance: 13,430; Referee: Marcos de Oliveira

== Canadian Championship ==
=== Bracket ===
Preliminary round single match
Langford, BC
CPL	Pacific FC	1
CPL	Cavalry FC	3
Montreal, QC
MLS	CF Montréal	5
APL	Calgary Blizzard SC	0
Langley, BC
CPL	Vancouver FC	2
BCPL	Langley United	0
Hamilton, ON
CPL	Forge FC	4
CPL	HFX Wanderers FC	0
Toronto (York Lions), ON
CPL	Inter Toronto FC	0
LS Pro	CS Saint-Laurent	1
Toronto (BMO), ON
MLS	Toronto FC	1
CPL	Atlético Ottawa	3
Laval, QC
CPL	FC Supra du Québec	3
OPL	Woodbridge Strikers	1

Quarter-finals two-legged tie
MLS	Vancouver Whitecaps FC	4	1	5
CPL	Cavalry FC	1	1	2
MLS	CF Montréal	2	2	4
CPL	Vancouver FC	1	1	2
CPL	Forge FC	1	2	3
LS Pro	CS Saint-Laurent	1	1	2
CPL	Atlético Ottawa	1	3	4
CPL	FC Supra du Québec	3	3	6

Semi-finals two-legged tie
MLS	Vancouver Whitecaps FC	1	1	2
MLS	CF Montréal	1	2	3
CPL	Forge FC	1	1	2
CPL	FC Supra du Québec	1	0	1

Final single match
Montreal, QC
MLS	CF Montréal	1 (2)
CPL	Forge FC (p)	1 (4)

=== Preliminary round ===
Win Draw Loss

May 6 Preliminary Round	CF Montréal	5–0	Calgary Blizzard SC	Montreal, QC
7:30 PM EDT	Losenko 18'; Rios 45'; Carmona 46'; Guboglo (yellow card) 47'; Jaime 66'; Amaya 70'	Report	Plenzik (yellow card) 89'	Stadium: Saputo Stadium; Attendance: 10,166; Referee: Renzo Villanueva

=== Quarterfinals ===
July 8 Quarterfinals	Vancouver FC	1–2	CF Montréal	Langley, BC
10:00 PM EDT	Mezquida 54'	Report	Campagna 63' (o.g.); Owusu 90+2' (pen.)	Stadium: Willoughby Stadium; Attendance: 1,803; Referee: Scott Bowman

July 12 Quarterfinals	CF Montréal	2–1 (4–2 agg.)	Vancouver FC	Montreal, QC
7:30 PM EDT	Morales (yellow card) 26' (yellow-red card) 43'; Craig 56'; Bugaj (yellow card) 62'; Loturi (yellow card) 65'; Ríos 68'	Report	Field (yellow card) 55'; Doner 79'	Stadium: Saputo Stadium; Attendance: 12,222; Referee: Robert D'Alesio
Note: CF Montréal won 4–2 on aggregate.

=== Semifinals ===
September 2 First leg	Vancouver Whitecaps FC	1–1	CF Montréal	Vancouver, BC
10:00 PM EDT	Badwal (yellow card) 66'; Gauld 72'; Blackmon (yellow card) 90+1'	Report	Pereira 16' (yellow card) 43'; Ríos (yellow card) 30'; Ceballos (yellow card) 73'; Synchuk (yellow card) 90+6'	Stadium: BC Place; Attendance: 18,437; Referee: Renzo Villanueva

September 16 Second leg	CF Montréal	2–1 (3–2 agg.)	Vancouver Whitecaps FC	Montreal, QC
7:00 PM EDT	Ceballos (yellow card) 21'; Owusu 30' (pen.), 45', (yellow card) 41'	Report	Badwal (yellow card) 9'; Blackmon (yellow card) 21'; Adekugbe (yellow card) 29'; Sabbi 90+1'	Stadium: Saputo Stadium; Attendance: 10,333; Referee: Filip Dujic

=== Final ===
October 21 Final	CF Montréal	1–1 (a.e.t.) (2–4 p)	Forge FC	Montreal, QC
7:00 PM EDT	Craig (yellow card) 18'; Vera (yellow card) 32' (yellow-red card) 54'; Ríos 49'; Synchuk (yellow card) 100'	Report	James (yellow card) 24'; Cavallini (yellow card) 27'; Batisse 45+6'; Jevremović (yellow card) 82'	Stadium: Saputo Stadium; Attendance: 14,081; Referee: Michael Venne
	Penalties
	Owusu (penalty missed); Longstaff (penalty scored); Synchuk (penalty missed); Pereira (penalty scored)		(penalty scored) Borges; (penalty scored) Paton; (penalty missed) Krutzen; (penalty scored) Nimick; (penalty scored) James

== Statistics ==
=== Appearances, minutes played, and goals scored ===
No.	Nat.	Player	Total			Major League Soccer			Canadian Championship			MLS Cup Playoffs			Ref.
No.	Nat.	Player	App.	Min.	Gls	App.	Min.	Gls	App.	Min.	Gls	App.	Min.	Gls	Ref.
Goalkeepers
1	(Canada)	Sebastian Breza	16	1470	0	11	990	0	6	570	0	0	0	0	
31	(Chile)	Thomas Gillier	19	1710	0	19	1710	0	0	0	0	0	0	0	
41	(Canada)	Samsy Keita	3	270	0	3	270	0	0	0	0	0	0	0	
Defenders
2	(United States)	Jalen Neal	24	1857	0	19	1452	0	5	405	0	0	0	0	
3	(Colombia)	Brayan Ceballos	9	544	0	7	364	0	2	180	0	0	0	0	
4	(Colombia)	Brayan Vera	29	2407	1	27	2218	1	2	189	0	0	0	0	
5	(United States)	Brandan Craig	22	1429	1	17	958	0	5	471	1	0	0	0	
13	(Canada)	Luca Petrasso	34	2940	0	29	2462	0	5	478	0	0	0	0	
19	(United States)	Bode Hidalgo	4	254	0	4	254	0	0	0	0	0	0	0	
24	(Bolivia)	Efrain Morales	24	1785	0	22	1574	0	4	211	0	0	0	0	
27	(Poland)	Dawid Bugaj	31	2038	0	27	1943	0	4	95	0	0	0	0	
28	(Serbia)	Viktor Radojević	4	328	0	4	328	0	0	0	0	0	0	0	
36	(Canada)	Josh-Duc Nteziryayo	0	0	0	0	0	0	0	0	0	0	0	0	
Midfielders
6	(Canada)	Samuel Piette	24	1253	0	21	1175	0	3	78	0	0	0	0	
7	(Venezuela)	Daniel Pereira	14	783	1	12	685	0	2	98	1	0	0	0	
8	(England)	Matty Longstaff	37	2704	2	32	2299	2	6	405	0	0	0	0	
16	(Venezuela)	Wikelman Carmona	26	1480	5	23	1251	4	3	228	1	0	0	0	
17	(Trinidad and Tobago)	Dante Sealy	8	469	0	6	328	0	2	141	0	0	0	0	
18	(Ukraine)	Hennadiy Synchuk	27	1607	2	23	1443	2	4	164	0	0	0	0	
21	(Germany)	Fabian Herbers	26	1031	1	22	882	1	4	149	0	0	0	0	
22	(Canada)	Victor Loturi	36	2806	1	30	2264	1	6	542	0	0	0	0	
25	(United States)	Frankie Amaya	6	108	1	3	8	0	3	100	1	0	0	0	
26	(Ukraine)	Ivan Losenko	1	90	1	0	0	0	1	90	1	0	0	0	
29	(Guatemala)	Olger Escobar	26	671	0	24	551	0	2	120	0	0	0	0	
Forwards
9	(Ghana)	Prince Owusu	32	2494	18	26	2126	15	6	368	3	0	0	0	
10	(Chile)	Alexis Sánchez	15	934	0	14	875	0	2	52	0	0	0	0	
14	(Mexico)	Daniel Ríos	26	1504	10	28	1096	7	6	408	3	0	0	0	
23	(Switzerland)	Noah Streit	29	1482	1	25	1273	1	4	209	0	0	0	0	
35	(Canada)	Owen Graham-Roache	4	31	0	2	17	0	2	14	0	0	0	0	
No Longer with the Club
3	(Argentina)	Tomás Avilés	4	221	0	4	221	0	0	0	0	0	0	0	
7	(Ghana)	Kwadwo Opoku	6	187	1	5	97	1	1	90	0	0	0	0	
10	(Spain)	Iván Jaime	13	859	2	12	831	1	1	28	1	0	0	0	
17	(Iceland)	Dagur Dan Þórhallsson	13	816	1	10	608	1	3	208	0	0	0	0	
28	(Nigeria)	Sunusi Ibrahim	0	0	0	0	0	0	0	0	0	0	0	0	
39	(Canada)	Aleksandr Guboglo	2	138	0	1	63	0	1	75	0	0	0	0	
Last updated: November 3, 2026

=== Top scorers ===
Rank	Nat.	Player	Pos.	MLS	Canadian Championship	MLS Cup Playoffs	TOTAL
1	(Ghana)	Prince Owusu	FW	15	3		18
2	(Mexico)	Daniel Ríos	FW	7	3		10
3	(Venezuela)	Wikelman Carmona	MF	4	1		5
4	(England)	Matty Longstaff	MF	2			2
4	(Ukraine)	Hennadiy Synchuk	MF	2			2
4	(Spain)	Iván Jaime	MF	1	1		2
7	(Canada)	Victor Loturi	MF	1			1
7	(Ghana)	Kwadwo Opoku	FW	1			1
7	(Iceland)	Dagur Dan Þórhallsson	DF	1			1
7	(Colombia)	Brayan Vera	DF	1			1
7	(Switzerland)	Noah Streit	FW	1			1
7	(Germany)	Fabian Herbers	MF	1			1
7	(Ukraine)	Ivan Losenko	MF		1		1
7	(United States)	Frankie Amaya	MF		1		1
7	(United States)	Brandan Craig	DF		1		1
7	(Venezuela)	Daniel Pereira	MF		1		1
Totals				37	12	0	49

Updated to match played November 3, 2026
Italic: denotes player left the club during the season.

=== Top assists ===
Rank	Nat.	Player	Pos.	MLS	Canadian Championship	MLS Cup Playoffs	TOTAL
1	(Canada)	Luca Petrasso	DF	6	1		7
2	(Ghana)	Prince Owusu	FW	5			5
2	(Venezuela)	Wikelman Carmona	MF	4	1		5
2	(England)	Matty Longstaff	MF	4	1		5
5	(Switzerland)	Noah Streit	FW	3			3
5	(Canada)	Victor Loturi	MF	1	2		3
5	(Ghana)	Kwadwo Opoku	FW		3		3
8	(Bolivia)	Efrain Morales	DF	2			2
8	(Guatemala)	Olger Escobar	MF	1	1		2
8	(Mexico)	Daniel Ríos	FW	2			2
8	(Germany)	Fabian Herbers	MF	1	1		2
12	(United States)	Bode Hidalgo	DF	1			1
12	(Spain)	Iván Jaime	MF	1			1
12	(Ukraine)	Hennadiy Synchuk	FW	1			1
12	(Poland)	Dawid Bugaj	DF	1			1
12	(Chile)	Alexis Sánchez	FW	1			1
12	(Venezuela)	Daniel Pereira	MF	1			1
Totals				35	10	0	45

Updated to match played October 29, 2026
Italic: denotes player left the club during the season.

=== Goals against average ===
No.	Nat.	Player	Total			Major League Soccer			Canadian Championship			MLS Cup Playoffs		
No.	Nat.	Player	MIN	GA	GAA	MIN	GA	GAA	MIN	GA	GAA	MIN	GA	GAA
1	CAN	Sebastian Breza	1560	23	1.33	990	18	1.64	570	5	0.79	0	0	0.00
31	CHI	Thomas Gillier	1710	42	2.21	1710	42	2.21	0	0	0.00	0	0	0.00
33	CAN	Emil Gazdov	0	0	0.00	0	0	0.00	0	0	0.00	0	0	0.00
41	CAN	Samsy Keita	270	7	2.33	270	7	2.33	0	0	0.00	0	0	0.00

Updated to match played November 3, 2026
Source: CF Montréal
Italic: denotes player left the club during the season.

=== Clean sheets ===
No.	Nat.	Player	MLS	Canadian Championship	MLS Cup Playoffs	TOTAL
1	(Canada)	Sebastian Breza		1		1
31	(Chile)	Thomas Gillier	4			4
33	(Canada)	Emil Gazdov				0
41	(Canada)	Samsy Keita				0
Totals			4	1	0	5

Updated to match played August 3, 2026
Source: MLSsoccer.com
Italic: denotes player left the club during the season.

=== Top minutes played ===
No.	Nat.	Player	Pos.	MLS	Canadian Championship	MLS Cup Playoffs	TOTAL
22	(Canada)	Victor Loturi	MF	1589	242		1831
13	(Canada)	Luca Petrasso	DF	1615	180		1795
8	(England)	Matty Longstaff	MF	1565	166		1713
4	(Colombia)	Brayan Vera	DF	1547	135		1682
9	(Ghana)	Prince Owusu	FW	1530	80		1610
31	(Chile)	Thomas Gillier	GK	1530			1530
27	(Poland)	Dawid Bugaj	DF	1182	92		1274
24	(Bolivia)	Efrain Morales	DF	1071	148		1219
18	(Ukraine)	Hennadiy Synchuk	MF	862	104		966
23	(Switzerland)	Noah Streit	FW	779	150		929

Updated to match played August 20, 2026
Source: Montreal Impact
Italic: denotes player left the club during the season.

=== Yellow and red cards ===
No.	Player	Total			Major League Soccer			Canadian Championship			Ref.
No.	Player	Yellow card	(yellow card) (red card)	Red card	Yellow card	(yellow card) (red card)	Red card	Yellow card	(yellow card) (red card)	Red card	Ref.
1	Sebastian Breza	1	0	0	1	0	0	0	0	0	
2	Jalen Neal	3	0	0	2	0	0	1	0	0	
3	Brayan Ceballos	5	0	0	3	0	0	2	0	0	
4	Brayan Vera	7	1	1	6	0	1	1	1	0	
5	Brandan Craig	5	0	0	4	0	0	1	0	0	
6	Samuel Piette	4	0	0	4	0	0	0	0	0	
7	Daniel Pereira	5	0	0	4	0	0	1	0	0	
8	Matty Longstaff	7	0	0	7	0	0	0	0	0	
9	Prince Owusu	7	0	0	6	0	0	1	0	0	
10	Alexis Sánchez	2	0	0	2	0	0	0	0	0	
13	Luca Petrasso	1	0	0	1	0	0	0	0	0	
14	Daniel Ríos	4	0	0	3	0	0	1	0	0	
16	Wikelman Carmona	1	0	0	1	0	0	0	0	0	
17	Dante Sealy	1	0	0	1	0	0	0	0	0	
18	Hennadiy Synchuk	5	0	0	3	0	0	2	0	0	
19	Bode Hidalgo	0	0	0	0	0	0	0	0	0	
21	Fabian Herbers	4	0	0	4	0	0	0	0	0	
22	Victor Loturi	7	0	0	6	0	0	1	0	0	
23	Noah Streit	1	0	0	1	0	0	0	0	0	
24	Efrain Morales	2	1	0	1	0	0	1	1	0	
25	Frankie Amaya	1	0	0	0	0	0	1	0	0	
26	Ivan Losenko	0	0	0	0	0	0	0	0	0	
27	Dawid Bugaj	3	0	0	2	0	0	1	0	0	
28	Viktor Radojević	2	0	0	2	0	0	0	0	0	
29	Olger Escobar	4	0	0	4	0	0	0	0	0	
31	Thomas Gillier	3	0	0	3	0	0	0	0	0	
35	Owen Graham-Roache	0	0	0	0	0	0	0	0	0	
39	Aleksandr Guboglo	1	0	0	0	0	0	1	0	0	
41	Samsy Keita	0	0	0	0	0	0	0	0	0	
	Iván Jaime	1	0	0	1	0	0	0	0	0	
	Tomás Avilés	0	0	1	0	0	1	0	0	0	
	Dagur Dan Þórhallsson	1	0	0	0	0	0	1	0	0	
Totals		88	2	2	72	0	2	16	2	0	
Last updated: November 3, 2026

== Recognition ==
=== MLS Player of the Week ===
Week	Player	Nation	Position	Report
3	Carmona	Venezuela	MF	MLS Player of the Week: 3

=== MLS team of the Week ===
Week	Player	Nation	Position	Report
3	Carmona	Venezuela	MF	MLS team of the Week: 3
3	Gillier	Chile	BN	MLS team of the Week: 3
5	Owusu	Ghana	BN	MLS team of the Week: 5
8	Owusu	Ghana	FW	MLS team of the Week: 8
13	Longstaff	England	BN	MLS team of the Week: 13
15	Owusu	Ghana	FW	MLS team of the Week: 15
19	Vera	Colombia	DF	MLS team of the Week: 19
28	Owusu	Ghana	FW	MLS team of the Week: 28
28	Ríos	Mexico	BN	MLS team of the Week: 28
