= Samsy Keita =

Canadian soccer player (born 2009)

Personal information
- Date of birth: 27 July 2009 (age 17)
- Place of birth: Montreal, Quebec, Canada
- Height: 6 ft 5 in (1.96 m)
- Position: Goalkeeper

Team information
- Current team: CF Montréal
- Number: 41

Youth career
- –2024: Celtix du Haut-Richelieu
- 2024–2026: CF Montréal Academy

Senior career*
Years	Team	Apps	(Gls)
2026–	CF Montréal	4	(0)

International career
2025	Canada U16	2	(0)
2025–	Canada U17	5	(0)
- * Club domestic league appearances and goals as of 7 November 2026

Samsy Keita (born 27 July 2009) is a Canadian professional soccer player who plays as a goalkeeper for Major League Soccer club CF Montréal.

A product of the CF Montréal Academy, Keita signed a Homegrown contract with the club's first team in February 2026 at the age of 16, becoming the second-youngest academy graduate in club history to sign with the senior side. He has represented Canada at under-16 and under-17 level and was part of the squad at the 2025 FIFA U-17 World Cup.

== Early life and youth career ==
Keita was born in Montreal. He is the son of Ansu Keita, a former head coach of the Liberia national football team.

Keita came through the sport-études program at École secondaire De Mortagne in Boucherville and played youth soccer with Celtix du Haut-Richelieu before joining the CF Montréal Academy in July 2024. In 2025, he helped the academy's under-16 team qualify for the MLS Next playoffs. He began training with CF Montréal's first team at 15. In November 2025, La Presse gave him a special mention in its ranking of the top ten Quebec men's soccer prospects, noting that he was below the list's minimum age of 17 but had been named by enough of the experts it consulted; academy director Marinos Papageorgopoulos said no goalkeeper of Keita's age in the league had more potential.

== Club career ==
=== CF Montréal ===
Keita was invited to CF Montréal's 2026 preseason camps in Marbella, Spain, and Bradenton, Florida. After Jonathan Sirois was traded to FC Dallas, the club signed Keita on 6 February 2026 to a Homegrown contract running through the 2028–29 season, with options for 2029–30 and 2030–31. He became the 30th Homegrown signing in club history and the fifth academy goalkeeper to join the first team. Aged 16 years, six months and nine days, he was the second-youngest academy player to sign with the first team, after Jean-Aniel Assi in December 2020. Keita said he had been surprised to sign so quickly, and joined the squad as third-choice goalkeeper behind Thomas Gillier and Sebastian Breza.

== International career ==
Keita has represented Canada at under-16 and under-17 level. In October 2025, he was named to Canada's squad for the 2025 FIFA U-17 World Cup in Qatar, but did not play in any of Canada's four matches before their elimination by the Republic of Ireland in the round of 32.

Through his father, Keita also has Liberian heritage.

== Career statistics ==
As of November 7, 2026

Club	Season	League			Playoffs		Domestic Cup		Continental		Other		Total	
Club	Season	Division	Apps	Goals	Apps	Goals	Apps	Goals	Apps	Goals	Apps	Goals	Apps	Goals
CF Montréal	2026	Major League Soccer	4	0	0	0	0	0	—		0	0	4	0
Career total			4	0	0	0	0	0	0	0	0	0	4	0
