= Aleksandr Guboglo =

Canadian soccer player (born 2007)

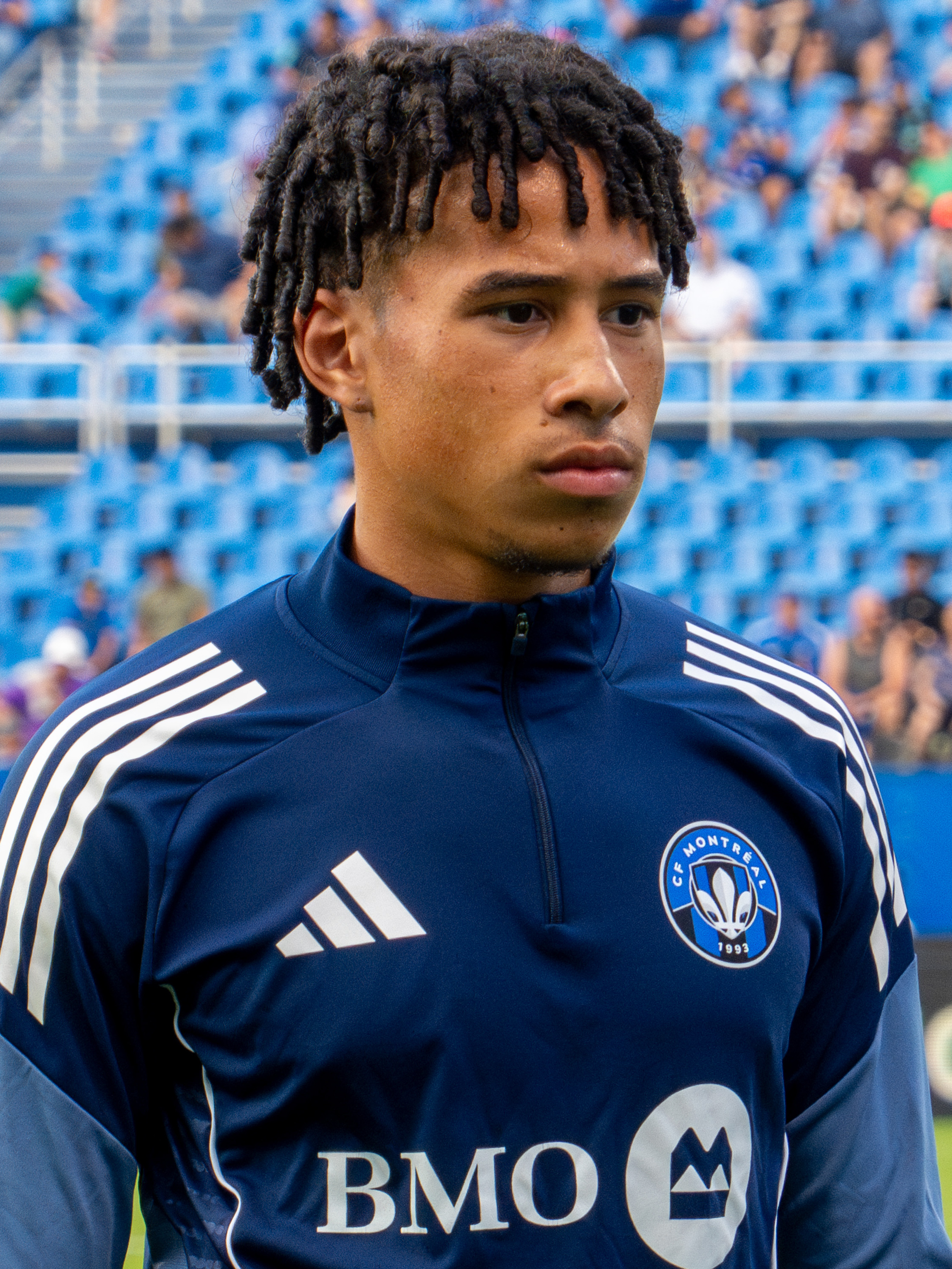
- Guboglo with CF Montréal in 2025

Personal information
- Full name: Yuri Aleksandr Guboglo
- Date of birth: 20 March 2007 (age 19)
- Place of birth: Ottawa, Ontario, Canada
- Height: 1.83 m (6 ft 0 in)
- Position: Right-back

Team information
- Current team: Reims (on loan from CF Montréal)

Youth career
- Ottawa South United
- 2019–2023: CF Montréal

Senior career*
Years	Team	Apps	(Gls)
2024	CF Montréal U23	4	(0)
2025–	CF Montréal	24	(0)
2026–	→ Reims (loan)	0	(0)

International career^{‡}
2023	Haiti U17	3	(0)
2025	Canada U18	2	(0)
2025–	Canada U20	6	(1)
- * Club domestic league appearances and goals as of July 23, 2026 ‡ National team caps and goals as of June 11, 2026

Yuri Aleksandr Guboglo (born 20 March 2007) is a Canadian professional soccer player who plays as a right-back for French Ligue 2 club Reims on loan from Major League Soccer club CF Montréal. A former youth international for Haiti, he most recently played for Canada internationally.

== Early life ==
Born in Canada, Guboglo was born to a Ukrainian father and Haitian mother. He played for the Haiti U17s at the 2023 CONCACAF U-17 Championship. He was called up to the Canada U18 for a set of friendlies in September 2025. On May 6, 2026, Guboglo's request to switch allegiance to Canada was approved by FIFA.

== Club career ==
=== CF Montréal ===
A youth product of Ottawa South United, Guboglo joined the youth academy of CF Montréal on 2019 where he finished his development. In January 2024, he started training with the senior CF Montréal team for the preseason. On 16 February 2025, he signed his first professional contract with CF Montréal through December 31, 2026, with options extending to 2029. He made his senior and professional debut with CF Montréal as a late substitute in a 1–0 Major League Soccer loss to Minnesota United on 3 March 2025.

=== Stade de Reims ===
In July 2026, CF Montréal would loan Guboglo to Ligue 2 side Stade de Reims for the 2026–27 season.

== Career statistics ==
=== Club ===
As of match played 6 May 2026

Appearances and goals by club, season and competition
Club	Season	League			National cup		Playoffs		Other		Total	
Club	Season	Division	Apps	Goals	Apps	Goals	Apps	Goals	Apps	Goals	Apps	Goals
CF Montréal	2025	MLS	23	0	1	0	—		3 (Note: Appearance(s) in Leagues Cup)	0	27	0
CF Montréal	2026	MLS	1	0	1	0	—		—		2	0
Career total			24	0	2	0	0	0	3	0	29	0
