= CF Montréal =

Soccer club in Montreal, Canada

- Full name: Club de Foot Montréal
- Nicknames: Le CFM (The CFM), L'Impact (The Impact)
- Short name: CFM, CFMTL
- Founded: December 10, 1992; 33 years ago (Note: MLS franchise founded in 2010. Original club founded in 1992 as Montréal Impact.)
- Stadium: Saputo Stadium; Montreal, Quebec
- Capacity: 19,619
- Owner: Joey Saputo
- President: Gabriel Gervais
- Head coach: Philippe Eullaffroy (interim)
- League: Major League Soccer
- 2026: Eastern Conference: 15th Overall: 30th Playoffs: Did not qualify
- Website: www.cfmontreal.com
Home colours	Away colours	Third colours

Club de Foot Montréal, also known as CF Montréal, is a Canadian professional soccer club based in Montreal. The club competes in Major League Soccer (MLS) as a member of the Eastern Conference. Founded in 1992 as the Montreal Impact (French: Impact de Montréal), they began playing in the MLS in 2012 as the league's nineteenth franchise and third Canadian club.

In 2015, the Impact was the first ever Canadian club and the second MLS club to advance to the final of the CONCACAF Champions League, where they lost to Club América.

The club rebranded as Club de Foot Montréal in 2021 with a new club logo and colours. Amidst discontent and pressure from supporters and local media, the club introduced a revised logo for the 2023 season, with the club being known simply as CF Montréal.

CF Montréal and its predecessor clubs have won the Voyageurs Cup, the domestic trophy for professional club soccer in Canada, a total of 11 times, five of which are within the format of the Canadian Championship, the national championship for professional clubs in Canada formed in 2008. The club competes in the Leagues Cup, the North American zonal competition for CONCACAF, and is eligible for the cross-border Campeones Cup, but does not take part in the U.S. Open Cup.

The club plays its home matches at Saputo Stadium and is managed by Philippe Eullaffroy.

== History ==
=== Founding and pre-MLS era ===
Montreal Impact were founded in December 1992 when the Saputo family acquired a new franchise in the American Professional Soccer League (APSL), at the time the top flight of professional U.S. and Canadian soccer, which was set to begin competition for the 1993 season. According to club owner Joey Saputo, the franchise was branded Impact because he wanted the team to make an impact on the sport in Montréal, in Québec and in Canada at large; the word is also identical in English and French, which eased marketing in the city's bilingual environment.

In 1994, the Impact defeated the Colorado Foxes 1–0 at Centre Claude Robillard in Montréal, in front of a crowd of 8,169. The victory was the first championship for a professional soccer club from the city of Montréal. The Impact were regular season champions for three consecutive seasons; from 1995 to 1996 in the APSL (rebranded as the A-League), and in 1997 as part of the post-merger USISL A-League. In 2004, the Impact won the A-League championship by defeating the Seattle Sounders 2–0 at Centre Claude Robillard in Montréal, in front of a crowd of 13,648—a new attendance record for the club at the time.

The A-League was renamed the USL First Division in November 2004. The Impact started the 2005 season with a 15-game undefeated streak and finished 10 points clear of second place to win the Commissioner's Cup. They were knocked out in the playoffs semi-finals by the Seattle Sounders. That same year, the club announced the construction of Saputo Stadium, a soccer-specific stadium and the club's current home, which opened on May 19, 2008. The Impact repeated as Commissioner's Cup winners in 2006 and won their first USL playoff championship in 2009 after they defeated the Vancouver Whitecaps 6–3 on aggregate in the two-legged final. The second leg was played at Saputo Stadium in front of a crowd of 13,034.

The Impact won the first seven editions of the Voyageurs Cup, the domestic trophy for professional soccer in Canada awarded to the best Canadian team in the USL First Division, from 2002 to 2007. Since 2008, the trophy has been awarded to the winner of the Canadian Championship. The Impact won the first edition of the competition in 2008 which qualified the club for the inaugural CONCACAF Champions League, their first continental tournament. The club advanced through the preliminary and group stages to the Champions League quarterfinals, where the Impact were defeated 5–4 on aggregate by Mexican club Santos Laguna. In 2009, the Impact announced plans to join the breakaway North American Soccer League (NASL), a new second division league, but due to legal disputes with the USL, they instead joined the temporary USSF Division 2 Professional League for one season in 2010. The Impact finished third in the league's NASL Conference and lost in the semifinals to Carolina RailHawks FC. The team also lead the league in average attendance with 12,608 spectators per match. Montréal ultimately played in the NASL for one season, failing to qualify for the playoffs, before being replaced by their MLS incarnation.

=== MLS franchise bid and transition ===
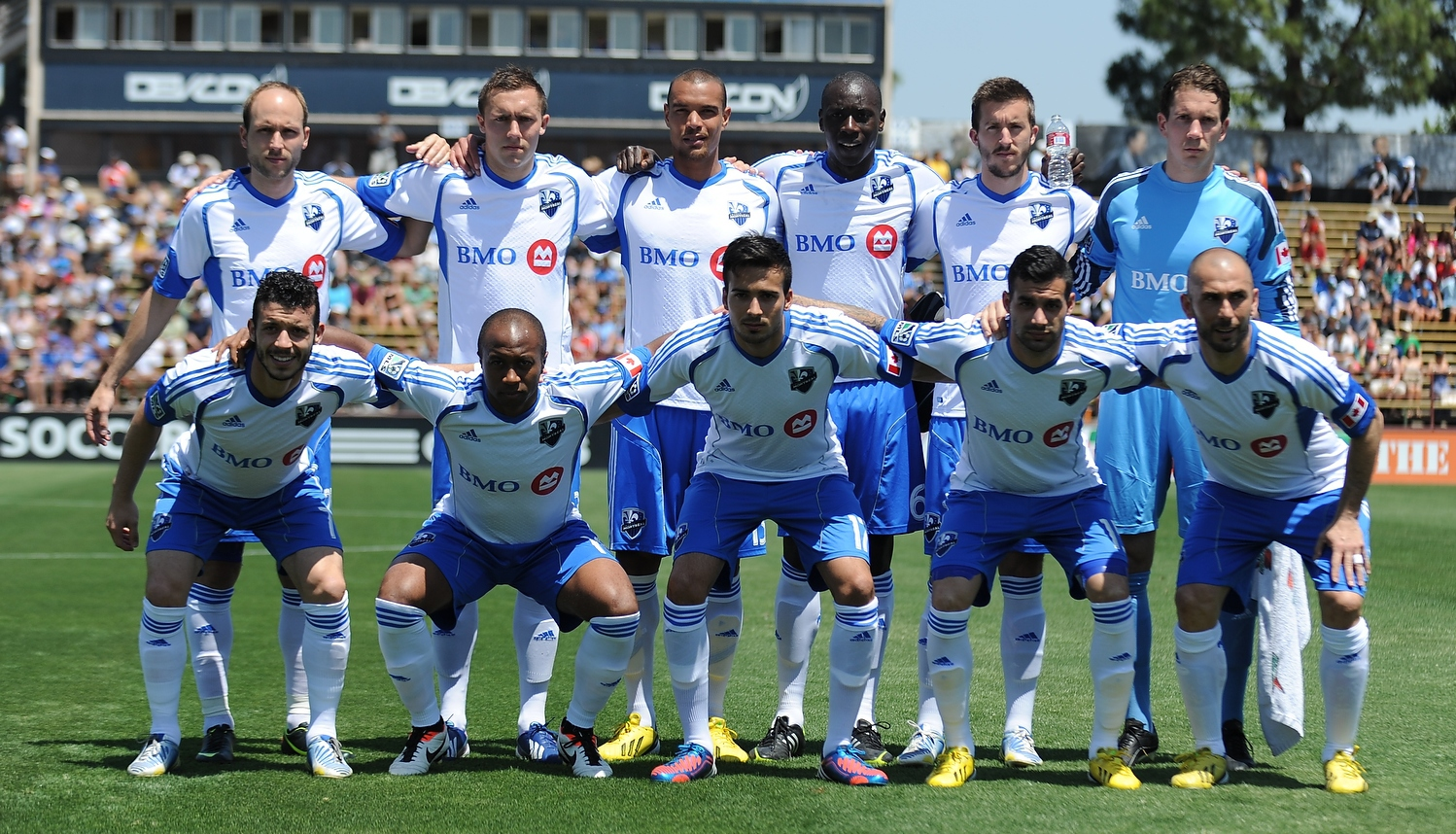
Montreal Impact pre-game lineup photo, 2013

Toward the end of 2007, much speculation had been made about a possible franchise move for the lower division Impact to Major League Soccer (MLS). The construction of the expandable Saputo Stadium further suggested an interest on the part of the group to move up to the top-level North American league. Although Toronto FC held a three-year Canadian exclusivity deal that did not expire until 2009, they stated in March 2008 that they would gladly welcome the Impact into MLS.

Chairman Joey Saputo held talks with George Gillett (former co-owner of Liverpool F.C. and former owner of the Montreal Canadiens) regarding possible joint ownership of a franchise. On July 24, 2008, MLS announced they were seeking to add two expansion teams for the 2011 season, of which Montreal was listed as a potential candidate.

On November 22, 2008, the group's bid for an MLS franchise was not retained by commissioner Don Garber. In response to Vancouver's successful bid in March 2009, Impact GM Nick De Santis commented that he expected chairman Saputo to pursue and realize his vision of Montreal as an MLS franchise someday. By May 16, 2009, the Montreal Gazette reported Garber and Saputo had resumed talks for an expansion team to begin play in 2011.

On May 7, 2010, Garber and Saputo announced Montreal as the nineteenth club in Major League Soccer, set to begin play for the 2012 season. The MLS franchise is privately owned by the Saputo family.

On June 14, 2011, the Montreal Impact announced a five-year agreement with the Bank of Montreal to become their lead sponsor and jersey sponsor in MLS.

In August 2011, Jesse Marsch became the Impact's new head coach. The club began building their roster for their inaugural MLS season in October 2011 with the signing of defenseman Nelson Rivas, previously of Inter Milan. From their NASL roster, the Impact re-signed defender Hassoun Camara, goalkeeper Evan Bush and midfielder Sinisa Ubiparipovic to new MLS contracts. Through the MLS expansion draft, the Impact were able to select in November 2011 ten more players, most notably midfielder and American international Justin Mapp. The Impact also traded for Davy Arnaud from Sporting Kansas City who would eventually become the team's first MLS captain. In December 2011, the club signed long-time Impact goalkeeper and Canadian international Greg Sutton, midfielder, Canadian international, future team captain and future Canada Soccer hall of famer Patrice Bernier, and Brazilian midfielder Felipe Martins. Veteran forward and long-time Impact player Eduardo Sebrango was invited to training camp and in February 2012 was awarded an MLS contract.

=== Beginnings in MLS and Champions League Final ===
2012 season

On March 10, 2012, the Impact played their inaugural MLS game, a 2–0 loss to Vancouver Whitecaps FC. A week later, the club made its home debut at the Olympic Stadium against the Chicago Fire, the game ending in a 1–1 draw. The match attracted 58,912 spectators, surpassing the previous record for professional soccer in Montréal established in a 1981 Montreal Manic home game against the Chicago Sting (58,542). On May 12, 2012, the Impact set a new attendance record for a professional soccer match in Canada with a crowd of 60,860 spectators during a game against the Los Angeles Galaxy which ended in 1–1 draw. On May 24, 2012, the club announced the signing of their first ever MLS Designated Player in Marco Di Vaio, previously of Bologna F.C. 1909. Di Vaio signed with the Impact after 14 seasons in Serie A and went on to score 34 goals in 76 appearances from 2012 to 2014 with the club. The Impact finished the 2012 regular season in seventh place in the Eastern conference with a record of 12 wins, 16 losses, and 6 ties. On November 3, 2012, head coach Jesse Marsch stepped down due to a difference of opinion with club management over how the team should move forward.

2013 season

On January 7, 2013, the Impact named Marco Schällibaum as head coach. Schällibaum had previously coached nearly 10 years in the Swiss Super League. On February 23, the Impact won the 2013 Walt Disney World Pro Soccer Classic, beating Columbus Crew 1–0 in the final during their pre-season campaign. On May 29, the club won the 2013 Canadian Championship by defeating Vancouver Whitecaps FC in the final, the Impact's first major trophy since joining MLS and their eighth Voyageurs Cup. As Canadian Champions, the Impact earned a spot in the 2014–15 CONCACAF Champions League, their second ever berth and first berth since joining MLS as an expansion team. The club finished the 2013 MLS regular season with a record of 14 wins, 13 losses, and 7 ties which earned them their first-ever MLS playoff berth, finishing in fifth place in the Eastern Conference. The Impact were eliminated by the Houston Dynamo in the knockout round. The club announced on December 18 that Marco Schällibaum would not return and former Chicago Fire coach Frank Klopas would replace him as the Impact's new head coach.

2014 season

The Impact became repeat Voyageurs Cup champions by defeating Toronto FC in the 2014 Canadian Championship final on June 4, 2014. Despite their success in the domestic cup, the Impact struggled in league play. The Impact finished the 2014 MLS season with a record of 6–18–10 (W-L-D), finishing last in the league.

In the 2014–15 CONCACAF Champions League, Montreal Impact won a group against the New York Red Bulls and FAS of El Salvador. They then won on the away goals rule against Pachuca of Mexico in the quarter-finals, and Alajuelense of Costa Rica in the semi-finals. In the final against Club América, the team lost 5–3 on aggregate despite drawing the first game 1–1 in Mexico City.

=== 2015–present ===
On August 29, 2015, head coach Frank Klopas was fired and replaced on an interim basis by former Impact player Mauro Biello. After qualifying for the playoffs and defeating Toronto FC in the first round before being eliminated in the Conference semi-finals by the Columbus Crew, Biello was hired permanently. The team was also boosted mid-season by the arrival of Ivory Coast forward Didier Drogba, formerly of Chelsea.

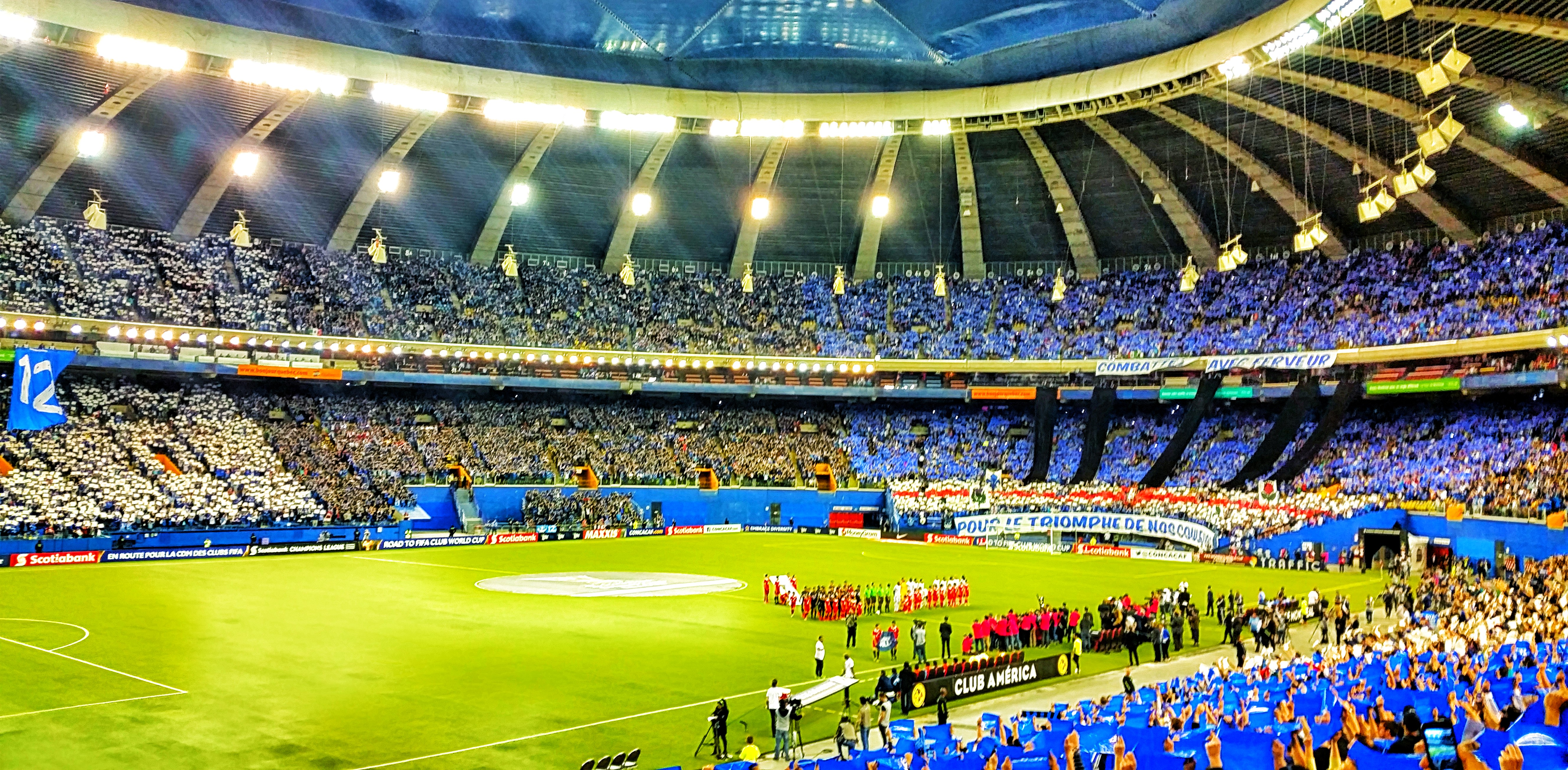
The Impact played the 2015 CONCACAF Champions League final before of a record 61,004

Biello was dismissed by the club in October 2017 after failing to qualify for the playoffs and was succeeded by Rémi Garde, formerly of Aston Villa. Garde was himself dismissed in August 2019 and replaced by former Colombian football defender Wilmer Cabrera on an interim basis. During Cabrera's time at the helm of the team, the Impact won the 2019 Canadian Championship defeating Toronto FC in the finals. Despite his success in the Canadian Championship, Cabrera failed to lead the team to the MLS playoffs and his contract was not renewed for the following season.

In November 2019, former France international Thierry Henry signed a two-year deal to coach the Impact. In his first season, the team made the playoffs for the first time since 2016, but were eliminated 2–1 by the New England Revolution in the first round. That same year, the Impact's first Champions League campaign since the 2015 final ended in the quarter-finals, with away goals elimination by Hondurian club C.D. Olimpia. Henry resigned in February 2021 stating family reasons for his decision to step down as head coach. In a press release, he said: "The last year has been an extremely difficult one for me personally. Due to the worldwide pandemic, I was unable to see my children. Unfortunately due to the ongoing restrictions and the fact that we will have to relocate to the U.S. again for several months will be no different. The separation is too much of a strain for me and my kids. Therefore, it is with much sadness that I must take the decision to return to London and leave CF Montreal." Following Henry's abrupt departure, assistant coach Wilfried Nancy was named interim head coach and following an impressive start to his first season, Nancy was made permanent and his contract renewed in May 2021 as head coach for 2022.

CF Montréal finished the 2022 MLS season in second place in the Eastern Conference and third place overall, the club's highest finish since their inaugural 2012 season in MLS. The club set a total of 8 new club records including for the number of wins in a season (20) and points in a regular season (65). They also set 2 new all-time MLS records for most road wins in a single season (11) and most consecutive road wins (7). CF Montréal were knocked out of the 2022 MLS playoffs in the Eastern Conference Semifinals by New York City FC by a score of 3–1, at Saputo Stadium. CF Montréal also set new club records for income earned from the sale of players with the sale of Djordje Mihailovic to AZ Alkmaar, Alistair Johnston to Celtic FC and Ismaël Koné to Watford FC. MLS 2022 Coach of the Year candidate, Wilfried Nancy left the club and signed with Columbus Crew in December 2022 and was replaced with former D.C. United head coach Hernán Losada. It was reported that Nancy had agreed with management to finish the season with CF Montréal following a verbal conflict with club owner, Joey Saputo, after a 3–0 loss to Sporting Kansas City in July but that he would be leaving the club after the end of the season.

On June 27, 2023, CF Montréal manager Losada gave six Québecois players a start in a 1–0 league win over the New England Revolution: it was the highest number of locally-based players ever featured in the starting XI since the team had first joined MLS.

CF Montréal parted ways with Losada after the 2023 regular season.

On 9 November 2026, Joey Saputo announced that the Saputo family had initiated a formal process to sell CF Montréal after more than three decades of ownership. Saputo expressed a preference for finding a buyer who would keep the club in Montreal, but acknowledged that relocation remained a possibility if a suitable local buyer could not be found.

The club retained BMO Capital Markets as its lead financial adviser and National Bank of Canada Capital Markets as co-adviser to oversee the sale process in coordination with Major League Soccer. CF Montréal announced that its existing management and staff would remain in their roles during the process.

== Team name, logo and colours ==
Logo used while the team was named the Montreal Impact (2012–2020)

In regards to keeping the name "Impact" upon the move to MLS, Montreal stated its intention "to maintain its name and global team image". The official logo for the team was revealed at the start of a match between the NASL Montreal Impact team and the NSC Minnesota Stars on August 6, 2011.

The previous logo was a shield in blue, black, white and silver containing a stylized fleur-de-lis and four silver stars, overlaid with the Impact wordmark. The fleur-de-lis, which also appeared on the logo of the NASL Impact team, is a globally recognized symbol of French heritage, and features prominently on the flag of Quebec as a reflection of Québécois culture. The four stars represent the four founding communities of Montreal identified on the city's coat of arms. At the top of the shield, the team's motto, "Tous Pour Gagner" (French for "all for victory") is inscribed. In 2020, the Impact unveiled a new slogan, "Passion. Fierté. Authenticité." (Passion. Pride. Authenticity.)

Logo used in 2021 and 2022

In January 2021, the club rebranded as Club de Foot Montréal (or CF Montreal), with Saputo saying "It's hard to let go of things you love. But here's the reality — to make an impact, we need to retire the Impact." As part of the rebranding, the club unveiled a new badge and colours. The club's new official colours were marketed as "Impact Black", "Ice Grey", and "Sacré Bleu". The badge predominantly featured four letter M's and eight arrows pointing to its centre, the elements combining to resemble a stylized snowflake. Creators stated that the new badge was a tribute to the emblems of the 1976 Summer Olympics and Expo 67.

The rebranding was poorly received by the club's main supporter group, the Ultras, who published a letter and a petition requesting the club go back to its previous name. In February 2021, supporters protested the rebranding in front of Saputo Stadium. During the protest, the stadium entrance sign featuring the new badge was vandalized by covering the new badge with black paint. One individual was arrested.

In May 2022, amidst declining ticket sales, continued discontent and pressure from fans and media alike, the club unveiled a new badge and announced that it would take effect for the 2023 season, with the club shortening the name to simply CF Montréal. The new badge features a return to the club's traditional colours with blue being predominant, and centred around a stylized fleur-de-lis, which the club has used as a symbol since 2002.

=== Uniform evolution ===
Home, away, and alternative uniforms.

- Home

2012–2013	2014–2015	2016–2018	2019–2020	2021–2022	2023–

- Away

2012–2014	2015–2016	2017–2019	2020–2021	2022–

- Alternative

2013–2014

== Club culture ==
=== Supporters group ===
"Ultras Montréal", also known as "UM02", was founded in 2002 and was CF Montréal's largest and oldest supporters group. The group's motto is "Toujours fidèles" in French and translates as "Forever faithful". The Ultras were a highly active group, known for their unwavering 90 minute chants, use of smoke grenades, creating large tifos, waving flags, and organizing road trips to follow the club on away games. The group was located directly behind the net, on the south side of Saputo Stadium, in section 132 with some spillover into section 131. Smaller independent groups also located in these sections, would join their voices to the Ultras during matches.

In September 2021, CF Montréal management announced that it was banning certain supporter groups, most notably, the Ultras Montréal. This move sparked many skeptical reactions as it came on the heels of a feud between the group and then president of the club, Kevin Gilmore. The conflict was a culmination of things that started almost exclusively with the rebranding of the club and abandonment of the highly popular team name, Montreal Impact. The club cited misconduct and past violent incidents, however no further specifics were given in their press release.

"127 Montréal" was formed in 2011 and were located in the south-west corner of Saputo Stadium, in section 127. The club removed several rows of seats at the bottom of the section to accommodate the group, making a small part of section 127 a standing room area only. The group could be identified in the stadium by a banner displaying the group's name and logo. The logo featured a snowy owl (Nyctea scandiaca), the official bird of the Province of Québec. Because of their proximity, 127 Montréal often joined supporters in 132 and 131 in their chants during matches. The group could also be seen during matches waving flags sporting the group's logo and using smoke grenades. Members of 127 Montréal occasionally joined other groups in travelling to away games. Following the 2024 season, with numbers unfortunately dwindling down, the few remaining members of 127 Montréal announced via social media that they would not be renewing their season tickets. Thus, the group naturally disbanded.

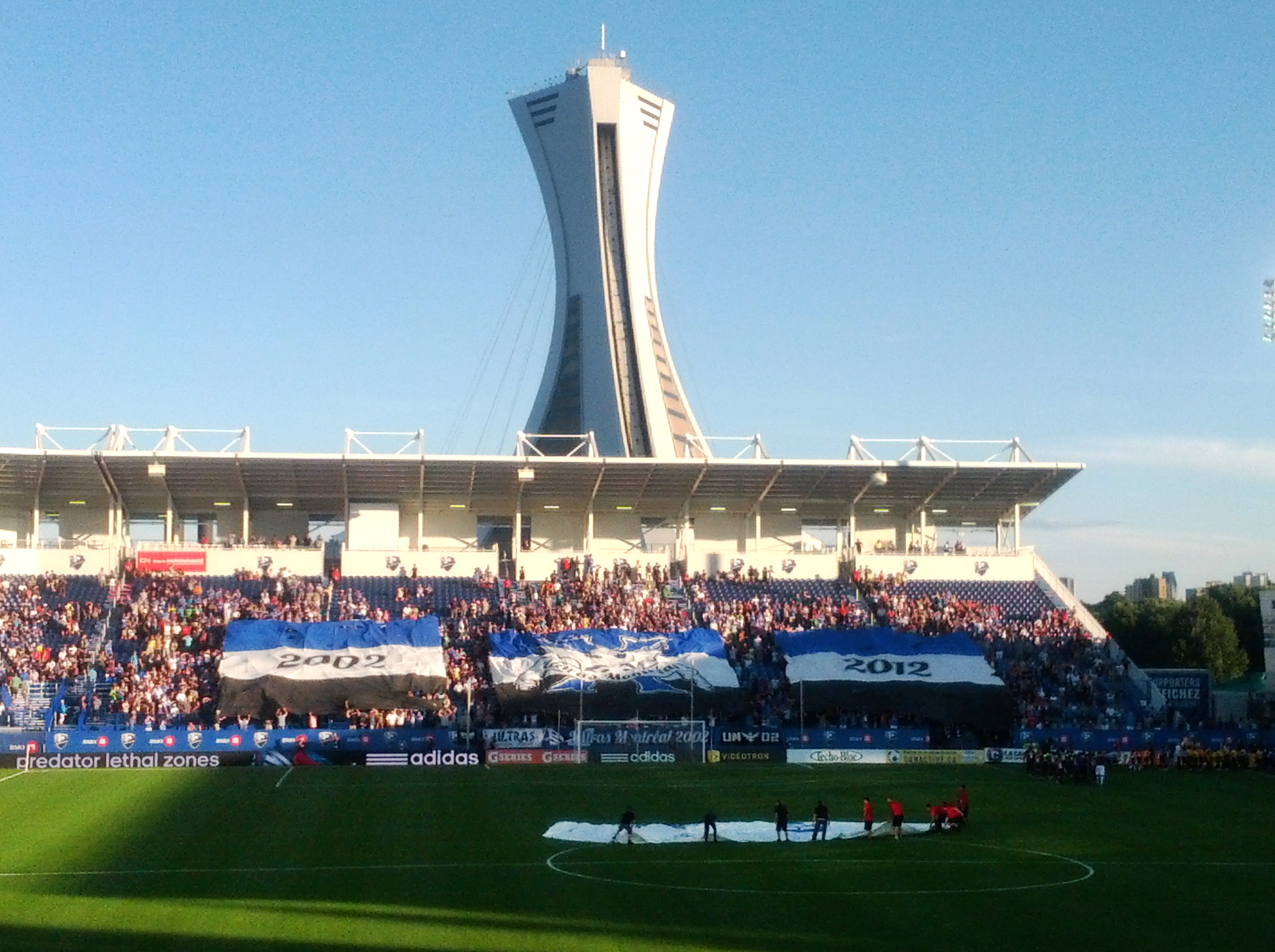
Banner for Ultras Montreal's 10th anniversary at Saputo Stadium before game between Montreal Impact and Columbus Crew on July 8, 2012

Named after the founding year of Montreal, "1642 MTL" is a supporters group formed in 2015 and located directly behind the net, on the north side of Saputo Stadium, in section 114. 1642 MTL are the owners and caretakers of the North Star bell. While previously highly active during matches, the group has seen hard times in recent years, having trouble maintaining an active group during 90 minutes every match in their section.

On September 6, 2022, the club announced that it would be reopening section 132 to supporter groups, the decision taking immediate effect. A collective of supporters, many of whom were previously active in section 132 prior to its closure in September 2021, confirmed they would be making the section their home as the "Collectif Impact Montréal". "Ultras Montréal" released a statement on September 7, 2022, indicating that they would not be part of the collective. Collectif Impact Montréal along with several other smaller groups and independent supporters located nearby have successfully relaunched section 132 as an ultra-style supporters section. Though not affiliated with the group, the legacy of the UM02 lives on through the Collectif, who continue to antagonize club management at every occasion and lead the fight for the return of the club's original name. With the steady decline of the other groups in Stade Saputo, Collectif remains the only active Ultras group in the stadium to organize large-scale tifos, as well as away day trips, keeping the energy high in 132 even through the difficult seasons following the departure of Nancy.

=== Mascot ===
The official mascot of the club was Tac-Tik the dog.

=== The North Star ===
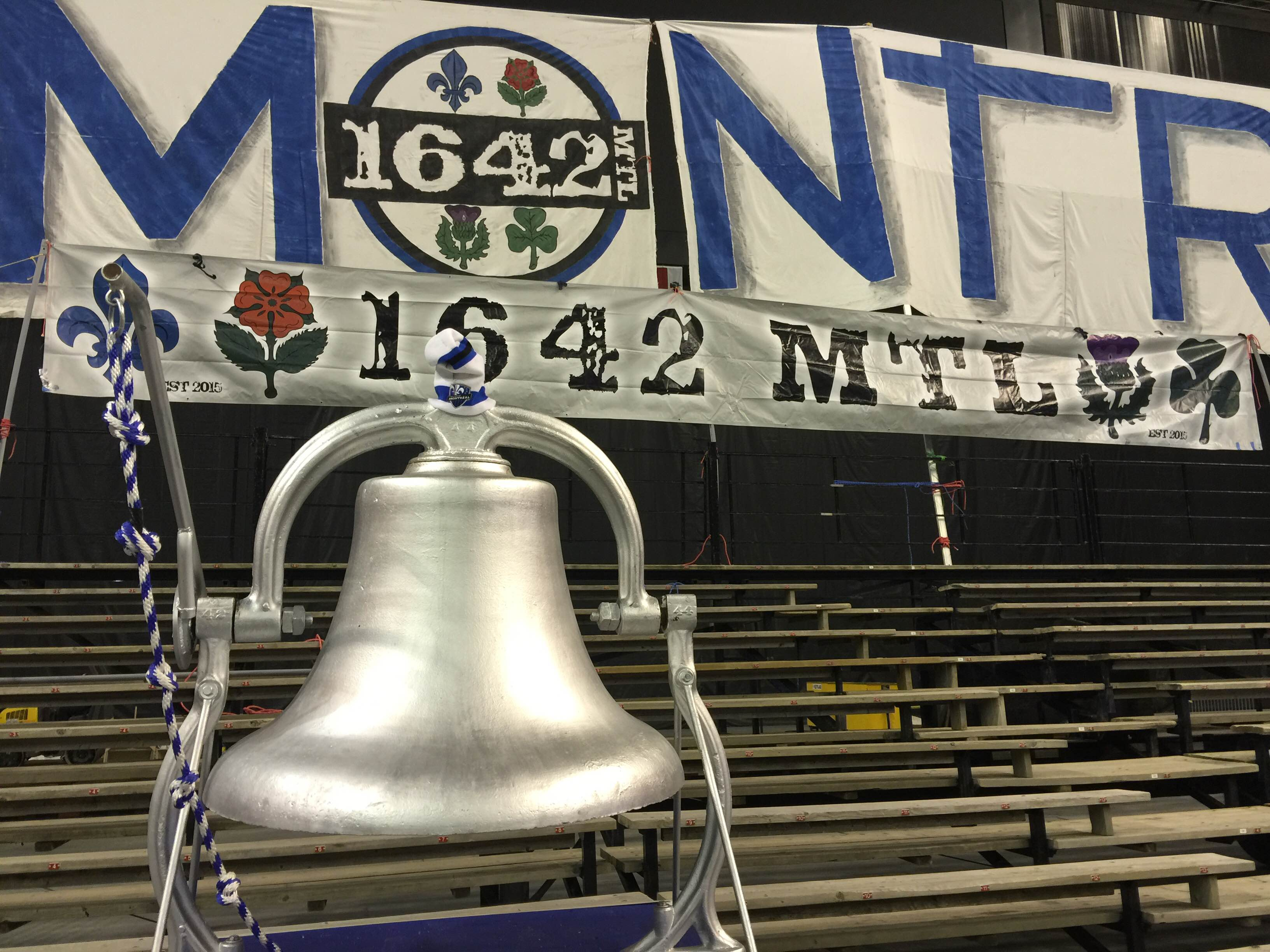
The North Star at the Olympic Stadium for the Montreal Impact's 2016 home opener

The "North Star" or "L'Étoile du Nord" in French is a 5-foot (1.5 m) high, 44-inch (110 cm) wide, 1,576-pound (715 kg) bell acquired by the 1642 MTL supporters group as a goal and victory celebration. It was inaugurated on October 25, 2015, by Montreal mayor Denis Coderre where it was rung twice in a Montreal Impact victory against Toronto FC. Since then, numerous personalities from the sports, cultural and art worlds, including many famous Montrealers and others linked to the city have been invited to ring the bell. Amongst them, local media personalities Tony Marinaro and Jean-Charles Lajoie, Canadian women's national soccer team players Gabrielle Carle and Josée Bélanger, retired Montreal Expos pitcher Bill "Spaceman" Lee, retired Montreal Canadiens centre Andrew Shaw, retired Montreal Alouettes quarterback Anthony Calvillo, mixed martial artist and former UFC champion Georges St-Pierre and many Canadian Olympic medallists.

The North Star is a symbolistic nod to the city's religious heritage. Québec is unique among Canadian provinces in its majority Roman Catholic population. Montréal is nicknamed "The City of a Hundred Steeples" for the many church steeples that dominated the city's skyline prior to the emergence of highrise buildings and skyscrapers; the prominence of these church steeples was remarked upon by Mark Twain during his visit to the city in 1881.

=== Rivalries ===
CF Montréal's biggest rival is Toronto FC, arguably the fiercest rivalry of MLS. Professional soccer clubs from Canada's two largest cities have competed against each other for over 40 years. From the original NASL, the Canadian Soccer League, the A-League until today in MLS, the rivalry has continued throughout various leagues and in the Canadian Championship. Since both teams have joined MLS, the rivalry has intensified, culminating in the 2016 MLS Eastern conference finals, arguably MLS' greatest playoff series. The first leg of the series at Stade Olympique in Montréal holds the record for the largest attendance for a match featuring two Canadian soccer teams with 61,004 fans. The matches between the two clubs have become a Canadian soccer classic which has been nicknamed the Canadian Classique or the 401 Derby, for the 401 highway that links the two cities.

The following table lists the history of official matches in MLS and the Canadian Championship between CF Montréal and Toronto FC.

	Matches	Montreal wins	draws	Toronto wins	Montreal goals	Toronto goals
MLS regular season (2012–)	31	13	5	13	43	46
MLS cup playoff (2012–)	3	2	0	1	8	7
Canadian Championship (2008–)	23	6	5	12	21	33
MLS is Back Tournament (2020)	1	0	0	1	3	4
Total Official matches	58	21	10	27	75	90

CF Montréal also shares a minor rivalry with Vancouver Whitecaps FC, which stems from their pre-MLS clubs, most notably in the USL-1 2009 finals when the Impact defeated the Whitecaps 3–1 in Montréal (6–3 on aggregate) to win the league championship on October 17, 2009. The rivalry transported to MLS after both clubs joined the league and has been sustained mainly through the Canadian Championship, most notably when the clubs faced off in the 2013 finals won by Montréal and the 2015 finals won by Vancouver.

== Affiliations ==
=== CF Montréal Academy and Reserves ===
CF Montréal Academy is the club's youth academy and development system, which was established in 2010. The academy consists of various teams, from U8 to U23. From 2010 to 2012, the academy entered a team in the Canadian Soccer League, which replaced their former reserve team Trois-Rivières Attak. In 2014, the U23 team competed in the USL Premier Development League, the fourth tier of the Canadian soccer pyramid. In 2015 and 2016, a reserve team competed in the United Soccer League under the name FC Montreal. Currently, they enter U18 and U16 teams in the U.S. Soccer Development Academy and a U23 team competing in the PLSQ.

=== Ottawa Fury FC ===
The Ottawa Fury FC, of the league then known as the United Soccer League and now as the USL Championship, entered into an affiliation agreement on December 9, 2016. That agreement ended when the Ottawa Fury were dissolved on November 8, 2019, and their USL franchise rights sold to Miami FC the following month.

== Stadium ==
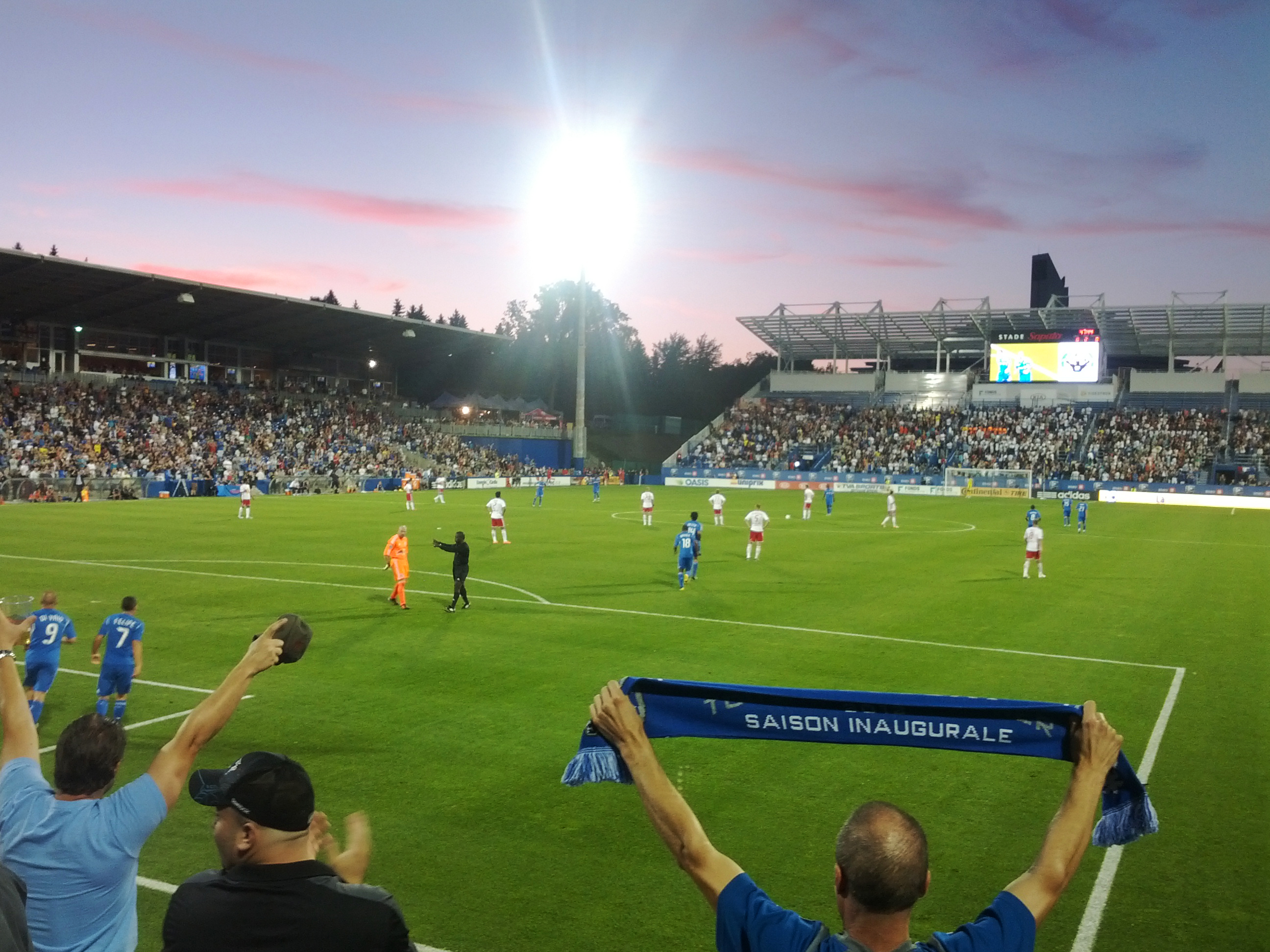
Montreal Impact match at Saputo Stadium against New York Red Bulls on July 28, 2012

CF Montréal plays its home matches at Saputo Stadium, a soccer-specific stadium with a natural grass playing surface built in 2008 for the then second division Montreal Impact but designed with expansion in mind with the club anticipating a move to MLS. The Québec government announced $23 million in funding to expand the stadium to more than 20,000 seats as well as build a training field with synthetic turf adjacent to the stadium.

Expansion to Saputo Stadium was expected to be finished in time for the start of the club's inaugural 2012 MLS season, but it was announced on July 17, 2011, that the expansion would be delayed. As a consequence, the neighbouring Olympic Stadium was used for the Impact's first six home dates (five MLS regular season, one Canadian Championship). The Impact's first MLS game at Saputo Stadium was eventually played on June 16, 2012, a 4–1 win over Seattle.

Though Saputo Stadium serves as the club's primary home, Olympic Stadium is also used for special events which demand a larger capacity or more favourable playing conditions (e.g. the team's season home opener, playoff matches, international competitions, and under winter conditions).

In June 2026, Major League Soccer commissioner Don Garber stated that Montréal’s Olympic Stadium “can be one of the great stadiums in the entire world” if the province completes its full renovation plan, following his tour of the facility during ongoing roof replacement work. Garber’s remarks came amid concerns raised by CF Montréal president Gabriel Gervais, who warned that the club’s long‑term viability under MLS’s forthcoming winter schedule depends on the stadium being fully modernized and available for year‑round use. While praising the redevelopment vision for Olympic Park, Garber emphasized that the current renovation—focused primarily on an $870 million roof project—does not include the interior upgrades required for winter play, and he dismissed comparisons to relocation scenarios in other markets as “not even comparable."

Home stadium

- Saputo Stadium; Montreal, Quebec (2012–present): capacity 20,801

Other stadiums

- Olympic Stadium, Montreal, Quebec (2012–present): capacity 61,004

== Broadcasting ==
As of the 2023 season, all CF Montreal matches are carried by MLS Season Pass on Apple TV, with all matches available with French, English, and Spanish commentary options. Selected matches will air in French on RDS and in English on TSN.

From its inception through 2022, nearly all CF Montreal matches aired on TVA Sports as the team's regional rightsholder. TVA Sports aired 24 matches during the team's inaugural season, with play by play duties held by Fréderic Lord and colour commentary provided by Vincent Destouches. From the 2017 season, TVA Sports became the French national rightsholder of Major League Soccer, televising all CF Montreal matches, as well as French-language coverage of other matches. The team never sold English-language television rights to its "regional" matches, but Montreal regular-season matches against Canadian opponents were broadcast in English by TSN as part of its rights to MLS (which covered the national MLS on TSN package, and separate rights to Toronto FC and Vancouver Whitecaps FC matches not covered by the national package).

CHMP 98.5 FM served as the club's French-language radio flagship from 2015 through 2020, with Jeremy Filosa on play-by-play and analyst Arcadio Marcuzzi. On January 19, 2021, CKLX 91.9 Sports announced that it would become the club's new French-language radio flagship through 2022. CKGM TSN 690 Montreal serves as the English-language radio flagship of the club. Jon Still handles play-by-play duties while colour commentary is provided by former Montreal player Grant Needham.

== Players and staff ==
=== Roster ===
As of September 17, 2026

Note: Flags indicate national team as defined under FIFA eligibility rules; some limited exceptions apply. Players may hold more than one non-FIFA nationality.

No.	Pos.	Nation	Player
1	GK	CAN	Sebastian Breza
2	DF	USA	Jalen Neal
3	DF	COL	Brayan Ceballos
4	DF	COL	Brayan Vera
5	DF	USA	Brandan Craig
6	MF	CAN	Samuel Piette (captain)
7	MF	VEN	Dani Pereira
8	MF	ENG	Matty Longstaff
9	FW	GHA	Prince Owusu
10	FW	CHI	Alexis Sánchez
13	DF	CAN	Luca Petrasso
14	FW	MEX	Daniel Ríos
16	MF	VEN	Wikelman Carmona
17	MF	TTO	Dante Sealy
18	MF	UKR	Hennadiy Synchuk

No.	Pos.	Nation	Player
19	DF	USA	Bode Hidalgo
21	MF	GER	Fabian Herbers
22	MF	CAN	Victor Loturi
23	FW	SUI	Noah Streit
24	DF	BOL	Efraín Morales
25	MF	USA	Frankie Amaya (on loan from Toluca)
26	MF	UKR	Ivan Losenko (on loan from Shakhtar Donetsk)
27	DF	POL	Dawid Bugaj
28	DF	SRB	Viktor Radojević (on loan from Chicago Fire)
29	MF	GUA	Olger Escobar
31	GK	CHI	Thomas Gillier (on loan from Bologna)
33	GK	CAN	Emil Gazdov
36	DF	CAN	Josh Nteziryayo
41	GK	CAN	Samsy Keita

=== Out on loan ===
Note: Flags indicate national team as defined under FIFA eligibility rules; some limited exceptions apply. Players may hold more than one non-FIFA nationality.

No.	Pos.	Nation	Player
15	DF	CAN	Félix Samson (on loan to FC Cincinnati)
35	FW	CAN	Owen Graham-Roache (on loan to Cavalry FC)
39	DF	CAN	Aleksandr Guboglo (on loan to Reims)

=== Retired numbers ===
20 – Mauro Biello, forward (1993–98, 2000–09)

=== Management ===
As of August 22, 2025

- (Canada) Joey Saputo – Owner
- (Canada) Gabriel Gervais – President and chief executive officer
- (Canada) Luca Saputo – Managing Director, Recruitment and Sporting Methodology
- (Canada) Simone Saputo – Managing Director, Academy Strategy and Roster Management
- (Canada) Eric Nadeau – Vice President & Chief Revenue Officer
- (Canada) Amélie Vaillancourt – Vice-President & Chief Human Resource Officer
- (Canada) Alexandre Panneton – Chief Communications and Branding Officer

== Coaching staff ==
As of April 12, 2026

- (France) Philippe Eullaffroy – Interim Head Coach
- (Italy) Francesco Morara – Assistant Coach
- (England) Elliott Jealous – Video Analyst
- (Italy) Vincenzo Benvenuto – Goalkeeper Coach
- (Italy) Stefano Pasquali – Performance Coach
- (England) Paul Bower – Physical Performance Coach
- (Canada) Dhia Amara – Strength and Conditioning Coach

=== Head coach records ===
As of May 20, 2025

Coach	Nation	Tenure	Record^{1}						
Coach	Nation	Tenure	G	W	L	T	Win %	Win or Tie%	Points per game
Jesse Marsch	United States	August 10, 2011 – November 3, 2012	36	12	17	7	33.33	52.77	1.19
Marco Schällibaum	Switzerland	January 7, 2013 – December 18, 2013	43	17	17	9	39.53	60.46	1.40
Frank Klopas	United States	December 18, 2013 – August 30, 2015	83	25	31	27	30.12	62.65	1.23
Mauro Biello	Canada	August 30, 2015 – October 23, 2017	93	36	35	22	38.71	62.36	1.40
Rémi Garde	France	November 8, 2017 – August 21, 2019	67	28	30	9	41.79	55.22	1.39
Wílmer Cabrera	Colombia	August 21, 2019 – October 24, 2019	9	3	5	1	33.33	44.44	1.11
Thierry Henry	France	November 14, 2019 – February 25, 2021	35	12	19	4	34.29	45.71	1.14
Wilfried Nancy	France	March 8, 2021 – December 6, 2022	79	37	25	17	46.84	68.35	1.62
Hernán Losada	Argentina	December 21, 2022 – November 9, 2023	40	15	19	6	37.50	52.50	1.28
Laurent Courtois	France	January 8, 2024 – March 24, 2025	45	12	20	13	26.67	55.55	1.09
Marco Donadel	Italy	March 24, 2025 – April 12, 2026	36	7	20	9	19.44	44.44	0.83
Philippe Eullaffroy	France	April 12, 2026 – Current	0	0	0	0	—	0	0

- 1.Includes league, playoff, Canadian Championship and CONCACAF Champions League matches.

== Honours ==
Domestic
Competitions	Titles	Seasons	Runners-up
Eastern Conference (Playoff)	0	–	2016
Eastern Conference (Regular Season)	0	–	2022
Canadian Championship	4	2013, 2014, 2019, 2021	2015, 2017, 2023, 2026
International
CONCACAF Champions League	0	–	2014–15

=== Friendly ===
- Walt Disney World Pro Soccer Classic: 2013
- CapCity Cup: 2018

== Team statistics and records ==
=== Year-by-year ===
This is a partial list of the last five seasons completed by CF Montréal. For the full season-by-season history, see List of CF Montréal seasons.

Season	MLS regular season													MLS playoffs	CC	Continental / other		Average attendance	Top goalscorer(s)	
Season	Div	League	Pld	W	L	D	GF	GA	GD	Pts	PPG	Conf Position	Overall Position	MLS playoffs	CC	Continental / other		Average attendance	Name(s)	Goals
2022	1	MLS	34	20	9	5	63	50	+13	65	1.91	2nd	3rd	QF	SF	CONCACAF Champions League	QF	14,828	(Honduras) Romell Quioto	15
2023	1	MLS	34	12	17	5	36	52	–16	41	1.21	10th	20th	DNQ	RU	Leagues Cup	GS	17,552	(Canada) Mathieu Choiniere	6
2024	1	MLS	34	11	13	10	48	64	–16	43	1.26	8th	17th	WC	QF	Leagues Cup	Ro32	19,619	(Venezuela) Josef Martínez	11
2025	1	MLS	34	6	18	10	34	60	−26	28	0.82	13th	28th	DNQ	QF	Leagues Cup	GS	16,162	(Ghana) Prince Owusu	17
2026	1	MLS	34	6	20	8	37	69	−32	26	0.76	15th	30th	DNQ	RU	DNQ		14,675	(Ghana) Prince Owusu	18

1. Avg. attendance include statistics from league matches only.
2. Top goalscorer(s) includes all goals scored in League, Playoffs, Canadian Championship, MLS is Back Tournament, CONCACAF Champions League, FIFA Club World Cup, and other competitive continental matches.

=== All-time continental competition win/loss ===
As of January 28, 2025

Club	Pld	W	D	L	GF	GA	GD
(Costa Rica) Alajuelense	2	1	0	1	4	4	0
(Mexico) América	2	0	1	1	3	5	−2
(Mexico) Atlético San Luis	1	1	0	0	3	2	1
(Mexico) Cruz Azul	2	0	1	1	1	2	−1
(United States) DC United	1	0	0	1	0	1	−1
(El Salvador) FAS	2	2	0	0	4	2	2
(Guatemala) Heredia	2	1	0	1	2	1	1
(United States) New York Red Bulls	2	1	1	0	2	1	1
(Honduras) Olimpia	2	1	0	1	2	2	0
(United States) Orlando City	1	0	0	1	1	4	−3
(Mexico) Pachuca	2	0	2	0	3	3	0
(United States) San Jose Earthquakes	2	1	0	1	1	3	−2
(Mexico) Santos Laguna	2	1	0	1	3	1	+2
(Costa Rica) Saprissa	2	0	2	0	2	2	0
(Mexico) UNAM	1	1^{(p.)}	0	0	2	2	0
Total	23	9	7	7	29	28	+1

=== International results ===
As of January 28, 2025

International results
Year	Competition	Club	Nation	Venue	Result	Attendance
2012	Pre-season Friendly	Guadalajara	Mexico	Guadalajara, Jalisco, Mexico	D 0–0	
2012	Pre-season Friendly	Tecos	Mexico	Guadalajara, Jalisco, Mexico	W 1–0	
2012	Pre-season Friendly	ITESO	Mexico	Guadalajara, Jalisco, Mexico	W 7–0	
2012	Pre-season Friendly	Atlas	Mexico	Guadalajara, Jalisco, Mexico	D 1–1	
2012	Pre-season Friendly	BK Häcken	Sweden	Lake Buena Vista, Florida, United States	W 1–0	
2012	Friendly	Lyon	France	Montreal, Quebec, Canada	L 1–2 (pen.)	19,225
2012	Postseason Friendly	Bologna	Italy	Bologna, Italy	L 0–1	1,839
2012	Postseason Friendly	Fiorentina Primavera	Italy	Florence, Italy	W 4–1	
2012	Postseason Friendly	Fiorentina	Italy	Florence, Italy	W 1–0	
2013	Champions League	San Jose Earthquakes	United States	Montreal, Quebec, Canada	W 1–0	15,115
2013	Champions League	Heredia	Guatemala	Guatemala City, Guatemala	L 0–1	
2013	Champions League	San Jose Earthquakes	United States	Santa Clara, California, United States	L 0–3	6,128
2013	Champions League	Heredia	Guatemala	Montreal, Quebec, Canada	W 2–0	13,703
2014	Walt Disney World Pro Soccer Classic	Fluminese U23	Brazil	Lake Buena Vista, Florida, United States	W 1–0	
2014	Champions League	FAS	El Salvador	Montreal, Quebec, Canada	W 1–0	9,209
2014	Champions League	FAS	El Salvador	San Salvador, El Salvador	W 3–2	
2014	Champions League	New York Red Bulls	United States	Montreal, Quebec, Canada	W 1–0	
2014	Champions League	New York Red Bulls	United States	Harrison, New Jersey, United States	D 1–1	
2015	Pre-season Friendly	Cruz Azul	Mexico	Mexico City, Mexico	L 0–1	
2015	Pre-season Friendly	Cruz Azul	Mexico	Mexico City, Mexico	W 1–0	
2015	Pre-season Friendly	Cuautla	Mexico	Mexico City, Mexico	W 6–0	
2015	Champions League	Pachuca	Mexico	Pachuca, Hidalgo, Mexico	D 2–2	12,000
2015	Champions League	Pachuca	Mexico	Montreal, Quebec, Canada	D 1–1, W 3–3 agg. (a)	38,104
2015	Champions League	Alajuelense	Costa Rica	Montreal, Quebec, Canada	W 2–0	33,675
2015	Champions League	Alajuelense	Costa Rica	Alajuela, Alajuela Province, Costa Rica	L 2–4, W 4–4 agg.	17,895
2015	Champions League	América	Mexico	Mexico City, Mexico	D 1–1	56,783
2015	Champions League	América	Mexico	Montreal, Quebec, Canada	L 2–4, L 3–5 agg.	61,004
2016	Friendly	Roma	Italy	Montreal, Quebec, Canada	L 0–2	20,801
2020	Champions League	Saprissa	Costa Rica	San José, Costa Rica	D 2–2	
2020	Champions League	Saprissa	Costa Rica	Montreal, Quebec, Canada	D 0–0, W 2–2 agg. (a)	21,505
2020	Champions League	Olimpia	Honduras	Montreal, Quebec, Canada	L 1–2	
2020	Champions League	Olimpia	Honduras	Orlando, Florida, United States	W 1–0, L 2–2 agg. (a)	0
2022	Champions League	Santos Laguna	Mexico	Torreón, Mexico	L 0–1	
2022	Champions League	Santos Laguna	Mexico	Montreal, Quebec, Canada	W 3–0, W 3–1 agg.	13,343
2022	Champions League	Cruz Azul	Mexico	Mexico City, Mexico	L 0–1	
2022	Champions League	Cruz Azul	Mexico	Montreal, Quebec, Canada	D 1–1, L 1–2 agg.	21,388
2023	Leagues Cup	UNAM	Mexico	Montreal, Quebec, Canada	T 2–2, W 6–4 (pen.)	19,619
2023	Leagues Cup	DC United	United States	Montreal, Quebec, Canada	L 0–1	19,619
2024	Leagues Cup	Orlando City	United States	Orlando, Florida	L 4–1	16,033
2024	Leagues Cup	Atlético San Luis	Mexico	Montreal, Quebec, Canada	W 2–3	17,314
2025	Leagues Cup	León	Mexico	Montreal, Quebec, Canada	T 1–1	14,272
2025	Leagues Cup	Toluca	Mexico	Harrison, NJ	L 1–2	12,149
2025	Leagues Cup	Puebla	Mexico	Montreal, Quebec, Canada	L 1–2	17,314
2026	Pre-season Friendly	FC Slovan Liberec	Czech Republic	Marbella, Spain	L 2–3	
2026	Pre-season Friendly	FC Metalist 1925 Kharkiv	Ukraine	Marbella, Spain	L 2–3	

=== CONCACAF Ranking Index ===
==== Current Ranking ====
As of March 25, 2024

Source: Concacaf | Official Website

Rank	Team	Points
24	(United States) Sporting Kansas City	1,178
25	(United States) Real Salt Lake	1,177
26	(United States) Atlanta United	1,175
27	(Canada) CF Montreal	1,174
28	(United States) Nashville SC	1,174
29	(United States) Minnesota United FC	1,173
30	(United States) Houston Dynamo FC	1,173

== Player records ==
=== Top appearances (MLS regular season matches only) ===
As of September 29, 2026

Rank	Pos.	Player	Nation	Career	Appearances	Ref.
1	Midfielder	**Samuel Piette**	Canada	2017–	227	
2	Goalkeeper	Evan Bush	United States	2012–2020	176	
3	Midfielder	Patrice Bernier	Canada	2012–2017	151	
4	Midfielder	Ignacio Piatti	Argentina	2014–2019	135	
5	Defender	Hassoun Camara	France	2012–2017	134	
6	Defender	Joel Waterman	Canada	2012–2017	130	
7	Defender	Rudy Camacho	France	2018–2023	128	
8	Midfielder	Mathieu Choinière	Canada	2018–2024	119	
9	Midfielder	Victor Wanyama	Kenya	2020–2024	117	
10	Defender	Zachary Brault-Guillard	Canada	2019–2023	106	

Bolded players are currently on the CF Montréal roster.

=== Top goalscorers (MLS regular season matches only) ===
As of September 29, 2026

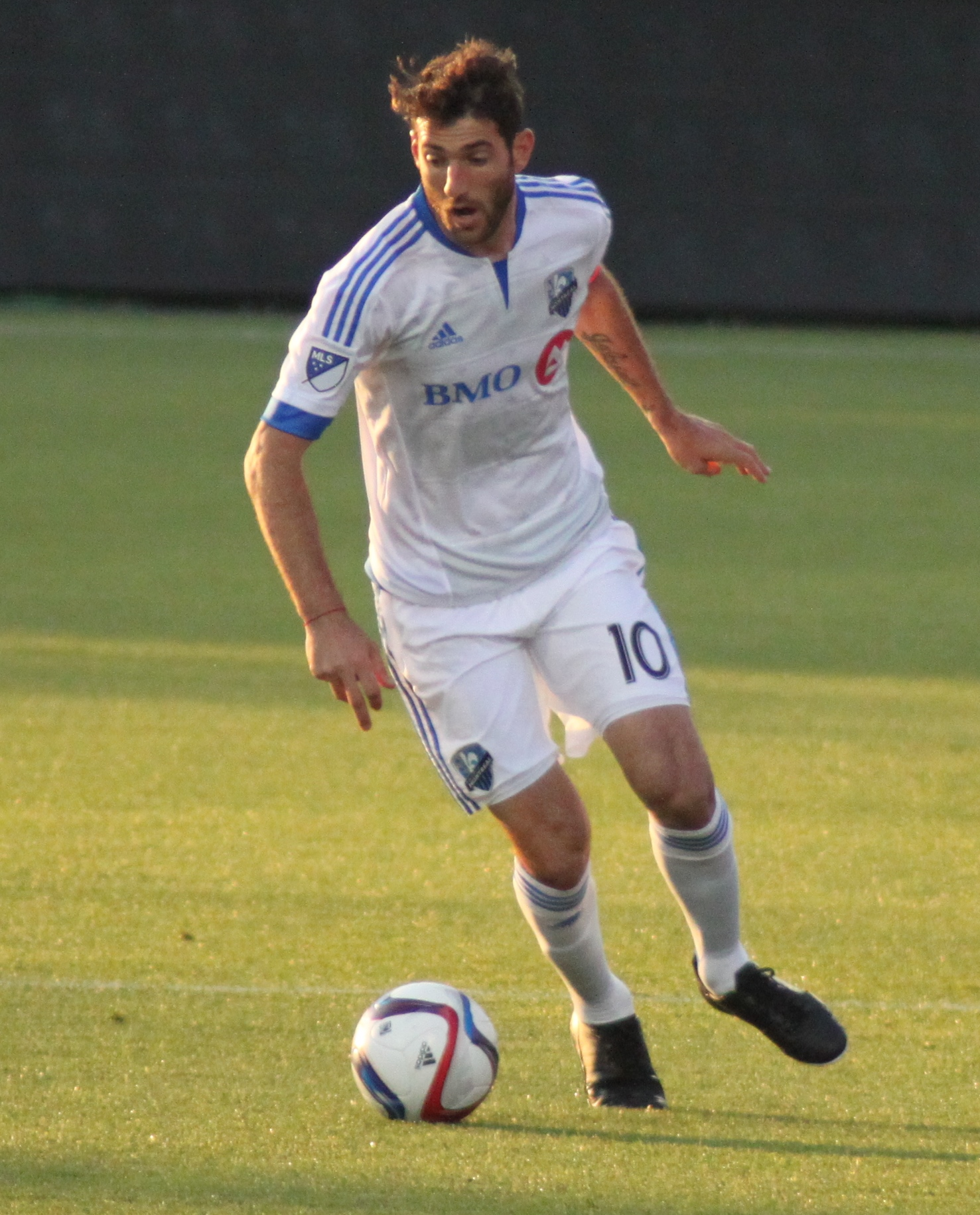
Ignacio Piatti is the MLS regular seasons all-time leading goalscorer for the club, with 66 goals.

Rank	Pos.	Player	Nation	Career	Appearances	Goals	Ref.
1	Midfielder	Ignacio Piatti	Argentina	2014–2019	135	66	
T2	Forward	Marco Di Vaio	Italy	2012–2014	76	34	
T2	Forward	Romell Quioto	Honduras	2020–2023	81	34	
4	Forward	**Prince Owusu**	Ghana	2025–present	59	28	
5	Forward	Didier Drogba	Ivory Coast	2015–2016	33	21	
6	Midfielder	Saphir Taïder	Algeria	2018–2020	76	20	
T7	Midfielder	Patrice Bernier	Canada	2012–2017	152	15	
T7	Forward	Anthony Jackson-Hamel	Canada	2014–2020	79	15	
T7	Forward	Lassi Lappalainen	Finland	2019–2024	99	15	
T7	Forward	Dominic Oduro	Ghana	2015–2018	89	15	

Bolded players are currently on the CF Montréal roster.

=== Top assists (MLS regular season matches only) ===
As of September 29, 2026

Rank	Pos.	Player	Nation	Career	Appearances	Assists	Ref.
1	Midfielder	Ignacio Piatti	Argentina	2014–2019	135	35	
2	Midfielder	Patrice Bernier	Canada	2012–2017	151	25	
3	Midfielder	Felipe	Brazil	2012–2015	93	24	
4	Midfielder	Djordje Mihailovic	United States	2021–2022	61	22	
T5	Midfielder	Justin Mapp	United States	2012–2015	82	21	
T5	Midfielder	Saphir Taïder	Algeria	2018–2020	76	21	
6	Forward	Romell Quioto	Honduras	2020–2023	81	19	
7	Forward	Lassi Lappalainen	Finland	2019–2024	99	15	
T8	Midfielder	**Samuel Piette**	Canada	2017–	226	12	
T8	Forward	Joaquín Torres	Argentina	2021–2022	55	12	
T8	Defender	Joel Waterman	Canada	2020–2025	130	12	

Bolded players are currently on the CF Montréal roster.

=== Top wins (MLS regular season matches only) ===
As of September 29, 2026

Rank	Pos.	Player	Nation	Career	Appearances	Wins	Ref.
1	Goalkeeper	Evan Bush	United States	2012–2020	176	64	
2	Goalkeeper	Jonathan Sirois	Canada	2020–2025	89	27	
3	Goalkeeper	Troy Perkins	United States	2012–2014	63	21	
4	Goalkeeper	**Sebastian Breza**	Canada	2021–	43	17	
5	Goalkeeper	James Pantemis	Canada	2018–2023	34	15	

Bolded players are currently on the CF Montréal roster.

=== Top clean sheets (MLS regular season matches only) ===
As of March 26, 2026

Rank	Pos.	Player	Nation	Career	Appearances	Clean Sheets	Ref.
1	Goalkeeper	Evan Bush	United States	2012–2020	176	40	
2	Goalkeeper	Jonathan Sirois	Canada	2020–2025	89	23	
3	Goalkeeper	Troy Perkins	United States	2012–2014	63	17	
T4	Goalkeeper	Clément Diop	Senegal	2018–2021	30	7	
T4	Goalkeeper	James Pantemis	Canada	2018–2023	34	7	

Bolded players are currently on the CF Montréal roster.

=== Giuseppe Saputo Trophy ===
The Giuseppe Saputo Trophy is awarded to the club's Most Valuable Player.

Year	Player	Nation	Ref.
2012	Patrice Bernier	Canada	
2013	Marco Di Vaio	Italy	
2014	Andrés Romero	Argentina	
2015	Ignacio Piatti	Argentina	
2016	Ignacio Piatti	Argentina	
2017	Ignacio Piatti	Argentina	
2018	Ignacio Piatti	Argentina	
2019	Orji Okwonkwo	Nigeria	
2020	Romell Quioto	Honduras	
2021	Djordje Mihailovic	United States	
2022	Romell Quioto	Honduras	
2023	Mathieu Choinière	Canada	
2024	Josef Martinez	Venezuela	
2025	Prince Owusu	Ghana	
2026	Prince Owusu	Ghana	

=== Golden Boot ===
CF Montréal's Golden Boot is awarded to the club's leading goalscorer.

Year	Player	Nation	Goals	Ref.
2012	Patrice Bernier	Canada	9	
2013	Marco Di Vaio	Italy	20	
2014	Marco Di Vaio	Italy	9	
2015	Didier Drogba	Ivory Coast	11	
2016	Ignacio Piatti	Argentina	17	
2017	Ignacio Piatti	Argentina	17	
2018	Ignacio Piatti	Argentina	16	
2019	Saphir Taïder	Algeria	9	
2020	Romell Quioto	Honduras	8	
2021	Romell Quioto	Honduras	8	
2022	Romell Quioto	Honduras	15	
2023	Mathieu Choinière	Canada	5	
2024	Josef Martinez	Venezuela	11	
2025	Prince Owusu	Ghana	13	
2026	Prince Owusu	Ghana	15	

Note Only MLS regular season goals counted

=== Defensive player of the year ===
Awarded to the club's best defender.

Year	Player	Nation	Ref.
2015	Laurent Ciman	Belgium	
2016	Hassoun Camara	France	
2017	Daniel Lovitz	United States	
2018	Evan Bush	United States	
2019	Bacary Sagna	France	
2020	Luis Binks	England	
2021	Rudy Camacho	France	
2022	Alistair Johnston	Canada	
2023	Jonathan Sirois	Canada	
2024	Samuel Piette	Canada	
2025	Victor Loturi	Canada	
2026	Brayan Vera	Colombia	

=== Jason Di Tullio Trophy ===
Awarded in recognition of the player who best embodied the spirit of "La Grinta" throughout the MLS season.

Year	Player	Nation	Ref.
2022	Tomas Giraldo	Canada	
2023	Mathieu Choinière	Canada	
2024	Samuel Piette	Canada	
2025	Sebastian Breza	Canada	
2026	Brandan Craig	United States	

=== Club captains ===
Period	Player	Nation	Ref.
2012–2013	Davy Arnaud	United States	
2014–2017	Patrice Bernier	Canada	
2018–2019	Ignacio Piatti	Argentina	
2020	Jukka Raitala	Finland	
2021–2022	Victor Wanyama	Kenya	
2021–2022	Kamal Miller	Canada	
2021–	Samuel Piette	Canada	
