= Noah Streit =

Swiss footballer (born 2005)

Personal information
- Full name: Noah Streit
- Date of birth: 11 October 2005 (age 21)
- Place of birth: Biel, Switzerland
- Height: 1.83 m (6 ft 0 in)
- Position: Winger

Team information
- Current team: CF Montréal
- Number: 23

Youth career
- FC Biel-Bienne
- 2016–2025: FC Basel

Senior career*
Years	Team	Apps	(Gls)
2025–2026	FC Basel	0	(0)
2025–2026	→ Neuchâtel Xamax (loan)	18	(2)
2026–	CF Montréal	0	(0)

International career^{‡}
- Switzerland U18
- Switzerland U19
- Switzerland U20
2025–	Switzerland U21		
- * Club domestic league appearances and goals as of 10 February 2026 ‡ National team caps and goals as of 10 February 2026

Noah Streit (born 11 October 2005) is a Swiss professional footballer who plays as a forward forMajor League Soccer club CF Montréal. He is also a current youth national for the Switzerland national football team.

== Club career ==
A youth product of FC Biel-Bienne, Streit joined the youth academy of FC Basel on 2016 where he finished his development. On 7 February 2025, he was loaned to Neuchâtel Xamax FCS where is made his professional debut. He would go onto appear in 18 league games and 3 cup games, scoring 2 goals.

On 9 February 2026, he was transferred to CF Montréal for an undisclosed fee. He also signed a contract through the 2029 season with a one-year option.

== International career ==
On the international stage, Streit has represented Switzerland at the U18, U19, U20 and U21 levels. He most recently featured for the Switzerland U21 squad in the 2027 UEFA European Under-21 qualifying matches in November 2025.

== Career statistics ==
=== Club ===
As of match played 15 March 2026

Appearances and goals by club, season and competition
Club	Season	League			National cup (Note: Includes Swiss Cup and Canadian Championship)		Continental		Other		Total	
Club	Season	Division	Apps	Goals	Apps	Goals	Apps	Goals	Apps	Goals	Apps	Goals
FC Basel II	2022–23	Swiss Promotion League	2	0	—		—		—		2	0
FC Basel II	2023–24	Swiss Promotion League	18	3	—		—		—		18	3
FC Basel II	2024–25	Swiss Promotion League	31	6	—		—		—		31	6
FC Basel II	Total		51	9	—		—		—		51	9
FC Basel	2025–26	Swiss Super League	0	0	0	0	0	0	—		0	0
Neuchâtel Xamax (loan)	2025–26	Swiss Challenge League	18	2	3	1	—		—		21	3
CF Montréal	2026	MLS	3	0	0	0	—		—		3	0
Career total			72	11	3	1	0	0	—		75	12
