= Jalen Neal =

American soccer player (born 2003)

Personal information
- Full name: Jalen Christopher Neal
- Date of birth: August 24, 2003 (age 23)
- Place of birth: Lakewood, California, United States
- Height: 6 ft 3 in (1.91 m)
- Position: Center-back

Team information
- Current team: CF Montréal
- Number: 2

Youth career
- 2015–2020: LA Galaxy

Senior career*
Years	Team	Apps	(Gls)
2020–2024	LA Galaxy II	49	(1)
2021–2024	LA Galaxy	34	(1)
2025–	CF Montréal	33	(1)

International career^{‡}
2019	United States U16	1	(0)
2021–2022	United States U20	10	(1)
2023–	United States	6	(0)
- * Club domestic league appearances and goals as of 16:53, 22 October 2026 (UTC) ‡ National team caps and goals as of July 9, 2023

Jalen Christopher Neal (born August 24, 2003) is an American professional soccer player who plays as a center-back for Major League Soccer club CF Montréal and the United States national team.

== Club career ==
Neal joined the LA Galaxy Academy in 2016, appearing in the former U.S. Soccer Development Academy system before graduating to the club's USL Championship affiliate LA Galaxy II in 2020. After making his professional debut on July 11 in a 4–0 defeat to Phoenix Rising, he would make 13 total league appearances for the club, scoring his first goal in the final match of the season against Reno 1868. Owing to his community outreach efforts, he was named the team's Humanitarian of the Year.

On January 20, 2021, Neal signed with LA Galaxy. He made his competitive debut for the club in May 2022, making a late substitute appearance in the club's U.S. Open Cup victory over California United Strikers.

Neal was dealt to CF Montréal on January 6, 2025.

== International career ==
In November 2021, Neal was named to the United States national under-20 team for the 2021 Revelations Cup. Despite being eligible for the team ahead of the 2023 FIFA U-20 World Cup, Neal was not released by LA Galaxy and therefore did not participate in the tournament.

Neal received his maiden call up to the senior national team for the 2023 January camp. He made his debut on January 25 in a 2–1 friendly defeat to Serbia.

Neal was named to the provisional and final roster for the senior national team at the 2023 CONCACAF Gold Cup. Neal made his competitive debut against Jamaica off the bench, and then started the other two group stage matches versus Saint Kitts and Nevis and Trinidad and Tobago respectively. Neal then became the youngest center back to appear for the USMNT in a knockout round match, at only 19 years, 319 days in the quarterfinal match up versus Canada. Although Neal was subbed out for a minor injury, the United States went advanced through a penalty shootout victory.

== Career statistics ==
=== Club ===
As of match played October 21, 2026

Appearances and goals by club, season and competition
Club	Season	League			National cup (Note: Includes U.S. Open Cup, Canadian Championship)		Playoffs		Continental		Other		Total	
Club	Season	Division	Apps	Goals	Apps	Goals	Apps	Goals	Apps	Goals	Apps	Goals	Apps	Goals
LA Galaxy II	2020	USL	12	0	—		1	1	—		—		13	1
LA Galaxy II	2021	USL	14	1	—		—		—		—		14	1
LA Galaxy II	2022	USL	21	0	—		—		—		—		21	0
LA Galaxy II	2024	MLS Next Pro	2	0	—		—		—		—		2	0
LA Galaxy II	Total		49	1	—		1	1	—		—		50	2
LA Galaxy	2022	MLS	—		1	0	—		—		1 (Note: Appearances in Leagues Cup)	0	2	0
LA Galaxy	2023	MLS	16	1	2	0	—		—		2	0	20	1
LA Galaxy	2024	MLS	18	0	—		3	0	—		3	0	24	0
LA Galaxy	Total		34	1	3	0	3	0	—		6	0	46	1
CF Montréal	2025	MLS	14	1	0	0	—		—		0	0	14	1
CF Montréal	2026	MLS	19	0	5	0	—		—		0	0	24	0
CF Montréal	Total		33	1	5	0	—		—		0	0	38	0
Career total			116	3	8	0	4	1	0	0	6	0	134	4

=== International ===
As of match played July 9, 2023

Appearances and goals by national team and year
National team	Year	Apps	Goals
United States	2023	6	0
Total		6	0

== Honors ==
LA Galaxy

- MLS Cup: 2024

United States U20

- CONCACAF U-20 Championship: 2022

Individual

- CONCACAF U-20 Championship Best XI: 2022
