= Matty Longstaff =

English footballer (born 2000)

Personal information
- Full name: Matthew Ben Longstaff
- Date of birth: 21 March 2000 (age 26)
- Place of birth: Rotherham, England
- Height: 5 ft 7 in (1.70 m)
- Position: Midfielder

Team information
- Current team: CF Montréal
- Number: 8

Youth career
- –2019: Newcastle United

Senior career*
Years	Team	Apps	(Gls)
2019–2023	Newcastle United	14	(2)
2021	→ Aberdeen (loan)	5	(0)
2022	→ Mansfield Town (loan)	16	(6)
2022–2023	→ Colchester United (loan)	7	(0)
2024–2025	Toronto FC	49	(2)
2025–	CF Montréal	41	(2)

International career
2019	England U20	2	(0)
- * Club domestic league appearances and goals as of 7 November 2026

Matthew Ben Longstaff (born 21 March 2000) is an English professional footballer who plays as a midfielder for Major League Soccer club CF Montréal.

== Club career ==
=== Newcastle United and loans ===
Longstaff made his first-team debut for Newcastle United on 28 August 2019, starting against Leicester City in the EFL Cup. He scored in the 72nd minute of his Premier League debut, in a 1–0 win against Manchester United on 6 October. The powerful strike from outside the box was later voted as Premier League Goal of the Month. He then went on to score in the reverse fixture at Old Trafford, the opening goal in a 4–1 defeat.

Following the expiration of his contract at the end of the 2019–20 season, Longstaff signed a new two-year contract with Newcastle United on 22 August 2020. In announcing their retained list for the 2023–24 season, Newcastle United released Longstaff at the end of his contract. However, the club continued to ensure he received treatment on his anterior cruciate ligament injury, which Longstaff suffered in December 2022.

On 27 August 2021, Longstaff joined Scottish club Aberdeen on a season-long loan. On 26 December 2021, Longstaff was recalled early by his parent club Newcastle United, having only featured five times for Aberdeen. On 31 January 2022, Longstaff joined EFL League Two side Mansfield Town on loan for the remainder of the season. On 1 September 2022, Longstaff joined EFL League Two side Colchester United on a short-term loan. He returned to Newcastle on 1 January 2023 following a knee injury.

=== Major League Soccer ===
On 29 February 2024, Major League Soccer club Toronto FC announced the signing of Longstaff as a free agent on a two-year contract, with an option for an additional year. On 5 May he scored his first goal for Toronto against FC Dallas.

On 13 August 2025, Longstaff was traded to CF Montréal in exchange for Jules-Anthony Vilsaint and up to $275,000 in General Allocation Money.

== International career ==
On 8 November 2019, Longstaff received his first international call up to the England U20 side. He made his debut as a substitute during a 4–0 win over Portugal on 14 November 2019.

== Personal life ==
Longstaff was born in Rotherham, South Yorkshire and raised in North Shields, Tyne and Wear. Longstaff went to school at John Spence Community High School. Longstaff was a boyhood Newcastle United supporter and his older brother Sean is a footballer for Leeds United. Their father David is a former Great Britain ice hockey player, who featured over 100 times for the national side, and is still active as coach for the Whitley Warriors. David is the cousin of former England international Alan Thompson.

== Career statistics ==
As of match played 7 November 2026

Appearances and goals by club, season and competition
Club	Season	League			National cup		League cup		Other		Total	
Club	Season	Division	Apps	Goals	Apps	Goals	Apps	Goals	Apps	Goals	Apps	Goals
Newcastle United U23	2018–19	—			—		—		5 (Note: Appearances in EFL Trophy)	1	5	1
Newcastle United	2019–20	Premier League	9	2	5	1	1	0	—		15	3
Newcastle United	2020–21	Premier League	5	0	0	0	0	0	—		5	0
Newcastle United	2021–22	Premier League	0	0	0	0	0	0	—		0	0
Newcastle United	2022–23	Premier League	0	0	0	0	0	0	—		0	0
Newcastle United	Total		14	2	5	1	1	0	0	0	20	3
Aberdeen (loan)	2021–22	Scottish Premiership	5	0	0	0	0	0	0	0	5	0
Mansfield Town (loan)	2021–22	League Two	16	6	0	0	0	0	0	0	16	6
Colchester United (loan)	2022–23	League Two	7	0	0	0	0	0	3	0	10	0
Toronto FC	2024	Major League Soccer	32	2	5	1	—		3 (Note: Appearances in Leagues Cup)	0	40	3
Toronto FC	2025	Major League Soccer	17	0	0	0	—		—		17	0
Toronto FC	Total		49	2	5	1	0	0	3	0	57	3
CF Montréal	2025	Major League Soccer	8	0	—		—		—		8	0
CF Montréal	2026	Major League Soccer	33	2	5	0	—		—		38	2
CF Montréal	Total		41	2	5	0	0	0	0	0	46	2
Career total			132	12	15	2	1	0	11	1	159	14

== Honours ==
Individual

- Premier League Goal of the Month: October 2019
