= Viktor Radojević =

Serbian footballer (born 2004)

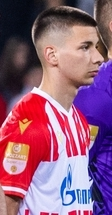
- Radojević with Red Star Belgrade in 2024

Personal information
- Full name: Viktor Radojević
- Date of birth: 14 July 2004 (age 22)
- Place of birth: Mladenovac, Serbia and Montenegro
- Height: 1.78 m (5 ft 10 in)
- Position: Left-back

Team information
- Current team: CF Montréal (on loan from Chicago Fire)
- Number: 28

Youth career
- –2022: Red Star Belgrade

Senior career*
Years	Team	Apps	(Gls)
2022–2024	Red Star Belgrade	6	(0)
2022–2024	→ Grafičar Beograd (loan)	47	(1)
2024–2025	TSC	31	(0)
2025–	Chicago Fire	10	(0)
2026–	Chicago Fire II	3	(0)
2026–	→ CF Montréal (loan)	4	(0)

International career^{‡}
2018–2019	Serbia U15	4	(0)
2019	Serbia U16	5	(0)
2020–2021	Serbia U17	3	(0)
2021–2022	Serbia U18	7	(0)
2022–2023	Serbia U19	7	(0)
- * Club domestic league appearances and goals as of 1 November er 2026 ‡ National team caps and goals as of 23 January 2024

Viktor Radojević (Serbian Cyrillic: Виктор Радојевић; born 14 July 2004) is a Serbian professional footballer who plays as a left-back for Major League Soccer club CF Montréal, on loan from Chicago Fire.

== Club career ==
=== Red Star Belgrade ===
Radojević started playing football in Mladenovac, and later passed all categories through the Red Star Belgrade academy. He was also loaned to Grafičar between 2022 and 2023. In early 2024 Radojević returned to the first squad.

=== Chicago Fire ===
On 22 August 2025, Radojević, signed with the Chicago Fire of Major League Soccer as part of their U22 Initiative. He signed through the 2028 season with an option for a further season.

== Career statistics ==
As of 23 January 2024

Appearances and goals by club, season and competition
Club	Season	League			National cup		Continental		Other		Total	
Club	Season	Division	Apps	Goals	Apps	Goals	Apps	Goals	Apps	Goals	Apps	Goals
Grafičar Beograd (loan)	2022–23	Serbian First League	22	0	1	0	—		0	0	23	0
Grafičar Beograd (loan)	2023–24	Serbian First League	19	1	2	0	—		—		21	1
Grafičar Beograd (loan)	Total		41	1	3	0	—		0	0	44	1
Red Star Belgrade	2023–24	Serbian SuperLiga	0	0	0	0	—		—		0	0
Red Star Belgrade	Total		0	0	0	0	—		—		0	0
Career total			41	1	3	0	—		0	0	44	1
