= Brandan Craig =

American soccer player (born 2004)

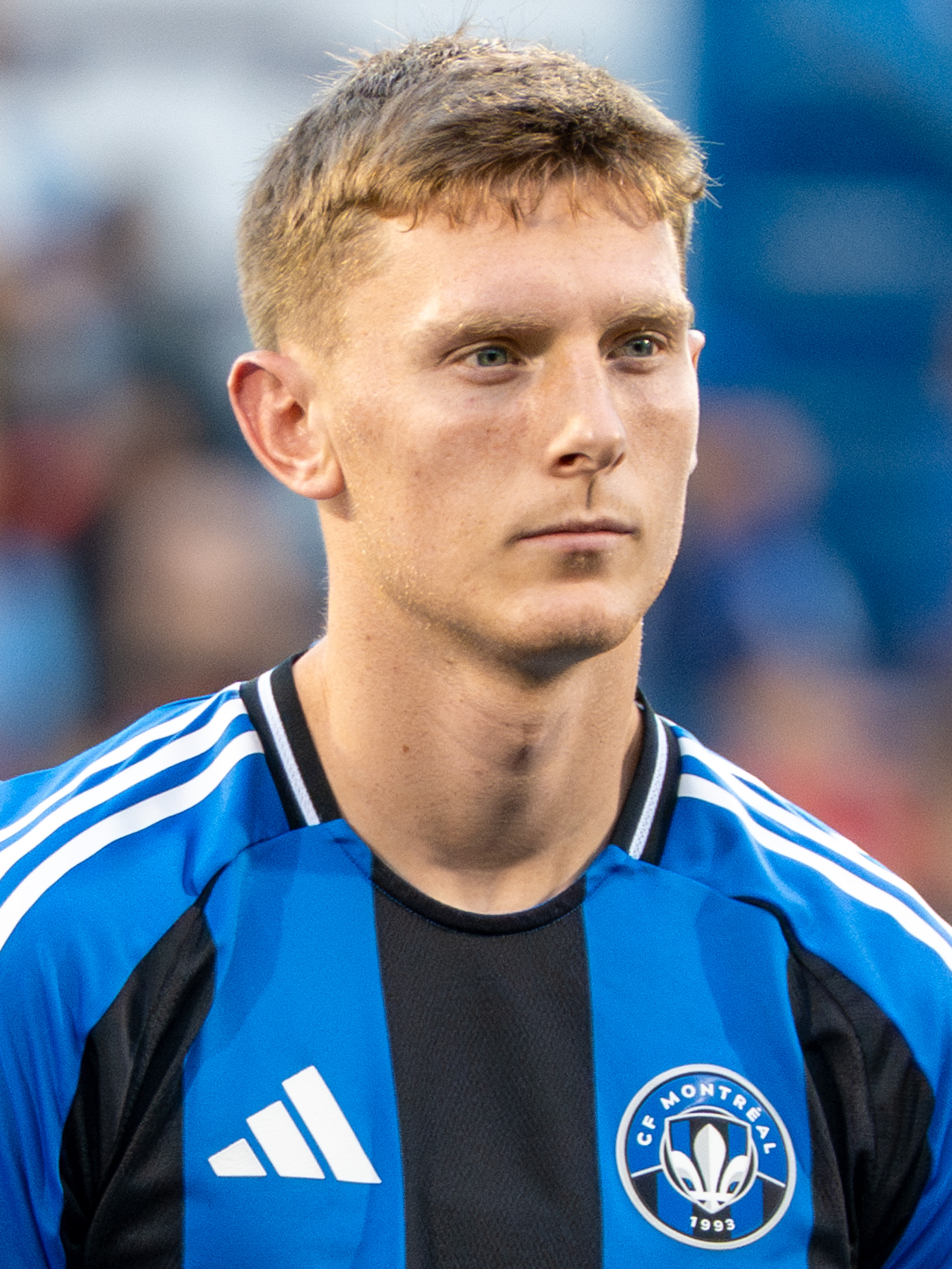
- Craig with CF Montréal in 2025

Personal information
- Full name: Brandan Andrew Craig
- Date of birth: April 7, 2004 (age 22)
- Place of birth: Philadelphia, Pennsylvania, United States
- Height: 6 ft 1 in (1.85 m)
- Positions: Defender; defensive midfielder

Team information
- Current team: CF Montréal
- Number: 5

Youth career
- 2016–2020: Philadelphia Union

Senior career*
Years	Team	Apps	(Gls)
2020–2023	Philadelphia Union II	38	(3)
2021–2024	Philadelphia Union	1	(0)
2023	→ Austin FC (loan)	0	(0)
2024	→ El Paso Locomotive (loan)	19	(1)
2025–	CF Montréal	28	(0)

International career^{‡}
2019	United States U15	5	(0)
2022–2023	United States U20	17	(1)
2023	United States U23	2	(0)
- * Club domestic league appearances and goals as of November 2, 2024 ‡ National team caps and goals as of November 16, 2023

Brandan Andrew Craig (born April 7, 2004) is an American professional soccer player who plays as a defender and defensive midfielder for CF Montréal.

== Club career ==
=== Philadelphia Union II ===
Craig spent four years for the Philadelphia Union Academy and played with the academy's U-12, U-13, U-14, U-15, U-16/17 and U-18/19 squads. He made his league debut for the club on July 22, 2020, coming on as a halftime substitute for Issa Rayyan in a 5–1 home defeat to New York Red Bulls II. On September 3, during a regular season game against Atlanta United 2, he became the youngest captain in team history.

=== Philadelphia Union ===
On January 1, 2021, Craig officially joined Philadelphia Union's MLS roster.

In July 2023, Craig was loaned to Austin FC. Craig made no first-team appearances with Austin, and in February 2024 he was loaned to El Paso Locomotive FC.

=== CF Montréal ===
Following his release from Philadelphia after their 2024 season, Craig signed with MLS side CF Montréal on February 7, 2025.

== Personal life ==
In addition to American citizenship, Craig holds a British passport as his father was born in England.

== Honors ==
United States U20

- CONCACAF U-20 Championship: 2022
