= Ivan Losenko =

Ukrainian footballer (born 2004)

Personal information
- Full name: Ivan Vitaliiovych Losenko
- Date of birth: 24 July 2004 (age 22)
- Place of birth: Bilozerske, Donetsk Oblast, Ukraine
- Height: 1.79 m (5 ft 10 in)
- Position: Midfielder

Team information
- Current team: CF Montréal (on loan from Shakhtar Donetsk)
- Number: 26

Youth career
- 2017–2024: Shakhtar Donetsk

Senior career*
Years	Team	Apps	(Gls)
2024–	Shakhtar Donetsk	0	(0)
2024–2025	→ Inhulets Petrove (loan)	18	(2)
2025	→ Kudrivka (loan)	12	(0)
2026–	→ CF Montréal (loan)	1	(1)

International career^{‡}
2019	Ukraine U15	5	(0)
2019	Ukraine U16	2	(0)
2021–2023	Ukraine U19	11	(1)
2023–2025	Ukraine U21	2	(0)
- * Club domestic league appearances and goals as of 7 May 2026 ‡ National team caps and goals as of 27 May 2026

Ivan Vitaliiovych Losenko (Ukrainian: Іван Вікторович Лосенко; born 24 July 2004 ) is a Ukrainian professional footballer who plays as an defender for CF Montréal, on loan from Shakhtar Donetsk.

== Club career ==
=== Early career ===
He started playing football at the academies of Shakhtar Donetsk.

=== Shakhtar Donetsk ===
In 2024 he was included in Shakhtar Donetsk's senior team.

==== Loan to Inhulets Petrove ====
In summer 2024 he moved on loan to Inhulets Petrove in Ukrainian Premier League. On 21 August 2024, he made his debut in Ukrainian Cup against Probiy Horodenka at the Probiy Arena in Horodenka. On 29 November 2024, he scored his first goal in Ukrainian Premier League against Vorskla Poltava at the Butovsky Vorskla Stadium in Poltava. On 12 May 2025 he scored against Livyi Bereh Kyiv. On 14 May 2025, he has been included in the symbolic team of the 28th round of the Ukrainian Premier League. At the end of the season, he returned to Shakhtar Donetsk.

==== Loan to Kudrivka ====
In July 2025 he moved on loan to Kudrivka just promoted in Ukrainian Premier League. On 11 August 2025, he made his debut against Zorya Luhansk at the Valeriy Lobanovskyi Dynamo Stadium in Kiev.

==== Loan to CF Montréal ====
In December 2025, he was loaned to CF Montréal.

== International career ==
In 2021 he was called up by the Ukraine under-19 team. In October 2025 he was called up by the Ukraine under-21 team after the two-years break, to play for the Qualitication for 2027 UEFA European Under-21 Championship.

== Honours ==
Shakhtar Donetsk U-19

- Ukrainian Premier League Reserves: (1) 2019–20
