= Thomas Gillier =

Chilean footballer (born 2004)

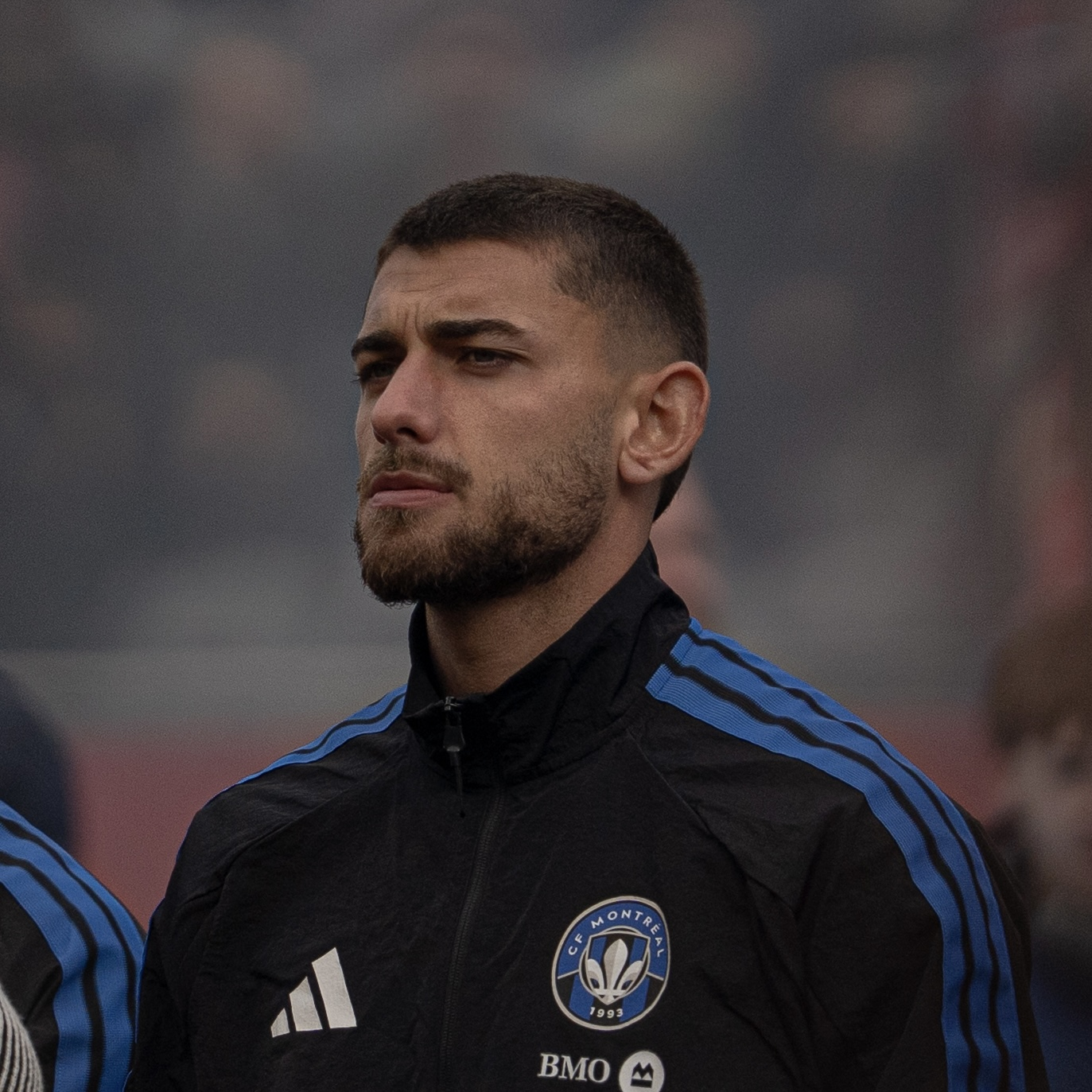

Personal information
- Full name: Thomas Clemente Philippe Gillier Correa
- Date of birth: 28 May 2004 (age 22)
- Place of birth: Las Condes, Santiago, Chile
- Height: 1.86 m (6 ft 1 in)
- Position: Goalkeeper

Team information
- Current team: CF Montréal (on loan from Bologna)
- Number: 31

Youth career
- 2015–2023: Universidad Católica

Senior career*
Years	Team	Apps	(Gls)
2024–2025	Universidad Católica	20	(0)
2025–	Bologna	0	(0)
2025–	→ CF Montréal (loan)	20	(0)

International career^{‡}
2022–2023	Chile U20	0	(0)
- * Club domestic league appearances and goals as of 28 February 2026 ‡ National team caps and goals as of 11 October 2022

Thomas Clemente Philippe Gillier Correa (born May 28, 2004) is a Chilean professional footballer who plays as a goalkeeper for Major League Soccer (MLS) club CF Montréal, on loan from Serie A club Bologna.

== Club career ==
Giller came to the Universidad Católica youth system at the age of 11. Gillier made his debut with the first team in a friendly match against the Argentine club River Plate on 9 September 2023. At league level, Gillier made his professional debut in a match against Ñublense on 23 February 2024.

On 2 July 2025, Gillier moved to Italy and signed with Bologna for five seasons. On 8 July, he joined on loan to Major League Soccer club CF Montréal until the end of the 2025 season with an option to extend for the next season. On 5 August, Gillier made his debut with Montreal, where he stopped an early penalty kick before giving up two goals in a 2–1 loss to Club Puebla of Liga MX.

== International career ==
Gillier received his first call up to the Chile senior team for the friendly match against Panama on 8 February 2025. Later, he was called up to the 2026 FIFA World Cup qualification matches in September of the same year.

== Personal life ==
Giller was born in Las Condes, Santiago city, Chile, to a French father and a Chilean mother, both died in 2024. His mother, Claudia Correa Bilbao, was a noted plastic artist and his father was a political scientist.

His paternal grandmother was born in Algeria.

Gillier speaks French.

== Career statistics ==
As of match played 10 February 2025

Appearances and goals by club, season and competition
Club	Season	League			National cup (Note: Includes Copa Chile, Coppa Italia, Canadian Championship)		Continental		Other		Total	
Club	Season	Division	Apps	Goals	Apps	Goals	Apps	Goals	Apps	Goals	Apps	Goals
Universidad Católica	2022	Chilean Primera División	0	0	0	0	0	0	—		0	0
Universidad Católica	2023	Chilean Primera División	0	0	0	0	—		—		0	0
Universidad Católica	2024	Chilean Primera División	20	0	3	0	1 (Note: Appearance in Copa Sudamericana)	0	—		24	0
Universidad Católica	2025	Chilean Primera División	0	0	2	0	0	0	—		2	0
Universidad Católica	Total		20	0	5	0	1	0	—		26	0
Bologna	2025–26	Serie A	0	0	0	0	—		—		0	0
Montréal (loan)	2025	MLS	8	0	—		—		—		8	0
Career total			28	0	5	0	1	0	0	0	34	0
