= 2024 CF Montréal season =

Canadian Major League Soccer team

CF Montréal
2024 season
- Owner: Joey Saputo
- Head coach: Laurent Courtois
- Stadium: Saputo Stadium
- Major League Soccer: Conference: 8th Overall: 17th
- MLS Cup playoffs: Wild card
- Canadian Championship: Quarter-finals
- Leagues Cup: Round of 32
- Top goalscorer: League: Josef Martínez (11); All: Josef Martínez (14)
- Average home league attendance: 19,619
Home colours	Away colours

The 2024 CF Montréal season was the club's 31st season of existence, and their 13th in Major League Soccer, the top tier of the American soccer pyramid.

In addition to competing in MLS, the club also played in the Canadian Championship and the Leagues Cup.

== Squad ==
As of August 29, 2024

No.	Player	Nationality	Position	Date of birth (age at year end)	Previous club
Goalkeepers
1	Sebastian Breza	CAN	GK	March 15, 1998 (age 28)	(Italy) Bologna
33	Logan Ketterer	USA	GK	November 9, 1993 (age 32)	(United States) El Paso Locomotive FC
40	Jonathan Sirois	CAN	GK	July 27, 2001 (age 25)	(Canada) Montreal Impact Academy
Defenders
3	Joaquín Sosa	URU	CB	January 10, 2002 (age 24)	(Italy) Bologna
4	Fernando Álvarez	COL	CB	August 24, 2003 (age 23)	(Mexico) C.F. Pachuca
11	Jahkeele Marshall-Rutty	CAN	RB	June 16, 2004 (age 22)	(Canada) Toronto FC
16	Joel Waterman	CAN	CB	January 24, 1996 (age 30)	(Canada) Cavalry FC
24	George Campbell	USA	CB	June 22, 2001 (age 25)	(United States) Atlanta United FC
25	Gabriele Corbo	ITA	CB	January 11, 2000 (age 26)	(Italy) Bologna
27	Dawid Bugaj	POL	RB	July 9, 2004 (age 22)	(Italy) SPAL
44	Raheem Edwards	CAN	LB	July 17, 1995 (age 31)	(United States) LA Galaxy
46	Tom Pearce	ENG	LB	April 12, 1998 (age 28)	(England) Wigan Athletic F.C.
Midfielders
2	Victor Wanyama	KEN	DM	June 25, 1991 (age 35)	(England) Tottenham Hotspur
6	Samuel Piette	CAN	DM	November 12, 1994 (age 31)	(Spain) CD Izarra
8	Dominik Yankov	BUL	AM	July 28, 2000 (age 26)	(Bulgaria) PFC Ludogorets Razgrad
10	Bryce Duke	USA	CM	February 28, 2001 (age 25)	(United States) Inter Miami CF
19	Nathan Saliba	CAN	CM	February 7, 2004 (age 22)	(Canada) Montreal Impact Academy
23	Caden Clark	USA	AM	May 27, 2003 (age 23)	(United States) Minnesota United FC
38	Alessandro Biello	CAN	CM	July 20, 2005 (age 21)	(Canada) Montreal Impact Academy
Attackers
7	Kwadwo Opoku	GHA	FW	July 13, 2001 (age 25)	(United States) Los Angeles FC
9	Matías Cóccaro	URU	FW	November 15, 1997 (age 28)	(Argentina) Club Atlético Huracán
14	Sunusi Ibrahim	NGA	FW	October 1, 2002 (age 24)	(Nigeria) Nasarawa United F.C.
17	Josef Martínez	VEN	FW	May 19, 1993 (age 33)	(United States) Inter Miami CF
21	Lassi Lappalainen	FIN	FW	August 24, 1998 (age 28)	(Italy) Bologna
28	Jules-Anthony Vilsaint	CAN	FW	January 6, 2003 (age 23)	(Belgium) Royal Antwerp F.C.

=== International roster slots ===
Montreal currently has six MLS International Roster Slots for use in the 2024 season. In addition, starting in 2022, CF Montreal were allowed to make three international players exempt from status if they have been on the roster for more than one year. They have sold two slots to Toronto FC & Inter Miami CF

CF Montréal International slots
Slot	Player	Nationality
Exempt	Lassi Lappalainen	Finland
Exempt	Victor Wanyama	Kenya
Exempt	Sunusi Ibrahim	Nigeria
1	Matías Cóccaro	Uruguay
2	Gabriele Corbo	Italy
3	Kwadwo Opoku	Ghana
4	Joaquín Sosa	Uruguay
5	Tom Pearce	England
6	Dawid Bugaj	Poland

Foreign-Born Players with Domestic Status
Player	Nationality
Fernando Álvarez	Colombia / (United States) USA
Josef Martínez	Venezuela / (United States) USA
Ruan	Brazil ^{G}
Jules-Anthony Vilsaint	Haiti / Canada
Rida Zouhir	Morocco / Canada
Dominik Yankov	Bulgaria / Canada
Ilias Iliadis	Greece / Canada

- (Canada) – Player is Canadian citizen;
- (United States) – Player is US citizen;
- G – Player has US green card;
- C – Player has permanent Canadian residency.

== Management ==
As of January 14, 2023

- (Canada) Joey Saputo – Owner
- (Canada) Gabriel Gervais – President and chief executive officer
- (Belgium) Olivier Renard – Vice president and Chief Sporting Officer
- (Canada) Salvatore Rivera – Vice-president & Chief Financial Officer
- (Canada) Amélie Vaillancourt – Vice-president & Chief Human Resource Officer
- (Canada) Samia Chebeir – Vice-president and Chief Marketing Officer
- (Canada) Daniel Pozzi – Director Soccer Operations & Roster Compliance

== Coaching staff ==
As of January 15, 2024

- (France) Laurent Courtois – head coach
- (Belgium) Laurent Ciman – assistant coach
- (France) David Sauvry – assistant coach
- (Cuba) Eduardo Sebrango – assistant manager
- (France) Romuald Peiser – goalkeeping coach
- (France) Barthélémy Delecroix – fitness Coach
- (Italy) Stefano Pasquali – assistant fitness Coach
- (France) Louan Schlicht – video Analyst
- (Italy) Luca Bucci – responsible for the goalkeeping development methodology

== Player movement ==
=== In ===
Per Major League Soccer and club policies terms of the deals do not get disclosed.

No.	Pos.	Player	Transferred from	Fee/notes	Date	Source
44	DF	(Canada) Raheem Edwards	(United States) LA Galaxy	Acquisition in return for $400,000 in 2024 GAM	December 11, 2023	
22	DF	(Brazil) Ruan	(United States) D.C. United	Acquired with $500,000 in GAM for Aaron Herrera	December 12, 2023	
1	GK	(Canada) Sebastian Breza	(Italy) Bologna	Free Transfer	January 15, 2024	
8	MF	(Bulgaria) Dominik Yankov	(Bulgaria) PFC Ludogorets Razgrad	Undisclosed	January 29, 2024	
9	FW	(Uruguay) Matías Cóccaro	(Argentina) Club Atlético Huracán	Undisclosed	January 31, 2024	
17	FW	(Venezuela) Josef Martínez	(United States) Inter Miami CF	Free Agent	February 6, 2024	
27	DF	(United States) Grayson Doody	(United States) UCLA	MLS Super Draft	March 5, 2024	
38	MF	(Canada) Alessandro Biello	(Canada) CF Montreal Academy	Signed from the academy	March 27, 2024	
27	MF	(Canada) Matteo Schiavoni	(Italy) Bologna	Undisclosed	March 27, 2024	
46	DF	(England) Tom Pearce	(England) Wigan Athletic F.C.	Free Transfer	July 12, 2024	
27	DF	(Poland) Dawid Bugaj	(Italy) SPAL	Undisclosed	July 16, 2024	
23	MF	(United States) Caden Clark	(United States) Minnesota United FC	$50,000 in GAM	August 8, 2024	
11	DF	(Canada) Jahkeele Marshall-Rutty	(Canada) Toronto FC	$850,000 in GAM	August 9, 2024	

=== Out ===
No.	Pos.	Player	Transferred to	Fee/notes	Date	Source
41	GK	(Canada) James Pantemis	(United States) Portland Timbers	Option declined	December 1, 2023	
15	DF	(Canada) Zachary Brault-Guillard	(Switzerland) FC Lugano	Option declined	December 1, 2023	
7	MF	(Egypt) Ahmed Hamdi	(Egypt) Zamalek SC	Option declined	December 1, 2023	
27	MF	(Canada) Sean Rea	(Spain) CD Castellón B	Option declined	December 1, 2023	
17	FW	(Democratic Republic of the Congo) Jojea Kwizera	(United States) Rhode Island FC	Option declined	December 1, 2023	
35	FW	(Canada) Jean-Aniel Assi	(United States) Crown Legacy FC	Option declined	December 1, 2023	
30	FW	(Honduras) Romell Quioto	(Iran) Tractor S.C.	Out of Contract	December 1, 2023	
22	FW	(Guatemala) Aaron Herrera	(United States) D.C. United	Traded for $500,000 in GAM and Ruan	December 12, 2023	
9	FW	(Nigeria) Chinonso Offor	(Bulgaria) FC Arda Kardzhali	Transfer Fee	June 26, 2024	
13	FW	(United States) Mason Toye	(United States) Portland Timbers	Traded for conditional GAM	July 23, 2024	
22	DF	(Brazil) Ruan	(United States) FC Dallas	Traded for conditional GAM	August 12, 2024	
11	FW	(Costa Rica) Ariel Lassiter	(United States) Chicago Fire FC	Traded for conditional GAM	August 14, 2024	
29	MF	(Canada) Mathieu Choinière	(Switzerland) Grasshopper Club Zurich	Transfer Fee	August 27, 2024	

=== Loans in ===
No.	Pos.	Player	Loaned from	Loan start date	Loan end date	Source
3	DF	(Uruguay) Joaquín Sosa	(Italy) Bologna	January 15, 2024	December 31, 2024	

=== Loans out ===
No.	Pos.	Player	Loaned to	Loan start date	Loan end date	Source
9	FW	(Nigeria) Chinonso Offor	(Bulgaria) FC Arda Kardzhali	February 5, 2024	June 26, 2024	
27	MF	(Canada) Matteo Schiavoni	(Canada) Forge FC	March 27, 2024	December 31, 2024	
26	DF	(Iceland) Róbert Thorkelsson	(Norway) Kongsvinger IL Toppfotball	April 4, 2024	December 31, 2024	
27	DF	(United States) Grayson Doody	(United States) Las Vegas Lights FC	July 19, 2024	December 31, 2024	
23	MF	(United States) Ousman Jabang	(United States) Las Vegas Lights FC	July 19, 2024	December 31, 2024	
18	MF	(Canada) Rida Zouhir	(United States) Birmingham Legion FC	August 8, 2024	December 31, 2024	
5	MF	(Greece) Ilias Iliadis	(Canada) Atlético Ottawa	August 9, 2024	December 31, 2024	

=== MLS SuperDraft picks ===
Round	No.	Pos.	Player	College/Club team	Transaction	Source
1	10	DF	Grayson Doody	UCLA	Signed	
2	39	DF	Malik Henry	Akron	Traded to Toronto FC	
3	68	FW	Eli Conway	Uconn		
3	86	MF	Carson Hodgson	Western Michigan		

== Friendlies ==
=== Pre-season ===
==== Matches ====
Win Draw Loss

January 27 1	Minnesota United FC	1–1	CF Montréal	Tucson, AZ
6:00 PM EDT	Mesanvi 66'		Wanyama 85'	Stadium: Kino Sports Complex

February 7 2	Atlanta United FC	2–1	CF Montréal	St. Petersburg, FL
4:00 PM EDT	Lobzhanidze; Wolff		Yankov	Stadium: Al Lang Stadium

February 10 3	Colorado Rapids	6–2	CF Montréal	Bay Lake, FL
6:00 PM EDT			Yankov; Saliba	Stadium: ESPN Wide World of Sports

February 14 4	UCF	Cancelled	CF Montréal	Orlando, FL
11:00 AM EDT		Report		Stadium: UCF Soccer and Track Stadium

February 17 5	Tampa Bay Rowdies	4–1	CF Montréal	St. Petersburg, FL
7:30 PM EDT		Report	Ibrahim 3'	Stadium: Al Lang Stadium

== Major League Soccer regular season ==
=== Tables ===
==== Eastern Conference ====
MLS Eastern Conference table (2024)
Pos	Team	Pld	W	L	T	GF	GA	GD	Pts	Qualification
6	New York City FC	34	14	12	8	54	49	+5	50	Qualification for round one and the 2025 Leagues Cup
7	New York Red Bulls	34	11	9	14	55	50	+5	47	Qualification for round one and the 2025 Leagues Cup
8	CF Montréal	34	11	13	10	48	64	−16	43	Qualification for the wild-card round and the 2025 Leagues Cup
9	Atlanta United FC	34	10	14	10	46	49	−3	40	Qualification for the wild-card round and the 2025 Leagues Cup
10	D.C. United	34	10	14	10	52	70	−18	40	

Source: MLS
Rules for classification: 1) points; 2) total wins; 3) total goal differential; 4) total goals scored; 5) fewer disciplinary points; 6) away goal differential; 7) away goals scored; 8) home goals differential; 9) home goals scored; 10) coin toss (2 clubs tied) or drawing of lots (≥3 clubs tied)

==== Overall ====
Overall MLS standings table
Pos	Team	Pld	W	L	T	GF	GA	GD	Pts	Qualification
15	Portland Timbers	34	12	11	11	65	56	+9	47	Qualification for the U.S. Open Cup Round of 32 (Note: As one of the best U.S. teams in the overall table to not qualify for the 2025 CONCACAF Champions Cup)
16	New York Red Bulls	34	11	9	14	55	50	+5	47	Qualification for the U.S. Open Cup Round of 32
17	CF Montréal	34	11	13	10	48	64	−16	43	
18	Austin FC	34	11	14	9	39	48	−9	42	Qualification for the U.S. Open Cup Round of 32 (Note: As one of the U.S. teams who did not qualify for the 2025 CONCACAF Champions Cup or the 2025 Leagues Cup)
19	FC Dallas	34	11	15	8	54	56	−2	41	Qualification for the U.S. Open Cup Round of 32

Source: MLS
Rules for classification: 1) points; 2) total wins; 3) total goal differential; 4) total goals scored; 5) fewer disciplinary points; 6) away goal differential; 7) away goals scored; 8) home goals differential; 9) home goals scored; 10) coin toss (2 clubs tied) or drawing of lots (≥3 clubs tied)

=== Results summary ===
Overall								Home						Away					
Pld	Pts	W	L	D	GF	GA	GD	W	L	D	GF	GA	GD	W	L	D	GF	GA	GD
34	43	11	13	10	48	64	−16	8	4	5	28	23	+5	3	9	5	20	41	−21

Last updated: October 19, 2024
Source: 2024 Major League Soccer season
Pld = Matches played; Pts = Points; W = Matches won; D = Matches drawn; L = Matches lost; GF = Goals for; GA = Goals against; GD = Goal difference

=== Matches ===
Win Draw Loss

February 24 1	Orlando City SC	0–0	CF Montréal	Orlando, FL
7:30 PM EDT	Cartagena (yellow card) 31'; McGuire (yellow card) 45+4'; Felipe (yellow card) 90'	Report	Lassiter (yellow card) 36'	Stadium: Inter&Co Stadium; Attendance: 24,249; Referee: Rafael Santos

March 2 2	FC Dallas	1–2	CF Montréal	Frisco, TX
8:30 PM EDT	Sealy (yellow card) 26'; Musa 45+1'; Arriola (yellow card) 66'	Report	Vilsaint 20'; Martínez 60'; Campbell (yellow card) 80'; Choinière (yellow card) 83'	Stadium: Toyota Stadium; Attendance: 19,096; Referee: Kyle Johnston

March 10 3	Inter Miami CF	2–3	CF Montréal	Fort Lauderdale, FL
5:00 PM EDT	Redondo (yellow card) 18'; Avilés (yellow card) 49'; Kryvtsov (yellow card) 57'; Campana 71', (yellow card) 86'; Alba 80'; Allen (yellow card) 90+3'	Report	Álvarez 13'; Vilsaint (yellow card) 63'; Cóccaro 75'; Ibrahim 78'; Edwards (yellow card) 90+3'	Stadium: Chase Stadium; Attendance: 21,212; Referee: Aleksandar Zhelyazkov

March 16 4	Chicago Fire FC	4–3	CF Montréal	Chicago, IL
2:00 PM EDT	Salquist (yellow card) 11'; Gasper (yellow card) 45+4'; Haile-Selassie 50+8'; Herbers (yellow card) 78'; Gutiérrez 84' (pen.); Cuypers 90+5'; Acosta 90+9'	Report	Cóccaro 7' (pen.), 12' (pen.), (yellow card) 16'; Yankov 70'; Edwards (red card) 82'; Choinière (yellow card) 90+11'	Stadium: Soldier Field; Attendance: 14,874; Referee: DeShun Beard

March 30 5	D.C. United	1–0	CF Montréal	Washington, DC
7:30 PM EDT	Dájome (yellow card) 52'; Klich (yellow card) 58'; Santos 85'	Report	Iankov (yellow card) 44'; Waterman (yellow card) 57'; Martínez (yellow card) 81'	Stadium: Audi Field; Attendance: 18,402; Referee: Ramy Touchan

April 6 6	Seattle Sounders FC	5–0	CF Montréal	Seattle, WA
10:30 PM EDT	Ruidíaz 20', 27'; Ragen (yellow card) 45+4'; Morris 48'; Roldán 81'; Teves 90+7'	Report	Waterman (yellow card) 26'; Saliba (yellow card) 42' (yellow-red card) 53'; Zouhir (yellow card) 90+2'; Campbell (yellow card) 90+3'	Stadium: Lumen Field; Attendance: 30,013; Referee: Filip Dujic

April 13 7	CF Montréal	2–1	FC Cincinnati	Montreal, QC
7:30 PM EDT	Waterman (yellow card) 29'; Piette (yellow card) 34'; Edwards (yellow card) 39'; Martínez 45+4'; Lassiter 62'	Report	Orellano (yellow card) 18'; Yedlin (yellow card) 23'; Kubo 58'; Murphy (yellow card) 66'	Stadium: Saputo Stadium; Attendance: 19,619; Referee: Lukasz Szpala

April 20 8	CF Montréal	2–2	Orlando City SC	Montreal, QC
7:30 PM EDT	Sosa (yellow card) 10'; Toye 16'; Sirois (yellow card) 20'; Waterman (yellow card) 77'; Lassiter (yellow card) 87', (goal) 88'	Report	Jansson (yellow card) 8'; Torres 22' (pen.); Araújo (yellow card) 63'; Angulo 90+2'	Stadium: Saputo Stadium; Attendance: 19,619; Referee: Jon Freemon

April 27 9	Columbus Crew	0–0	CF Montréal	Columbus, OH
7:30 PM EDT	Amundsen (yellow card) 76'	Report	Piette (yellow card) 22'; Campbell (yellow card) 62'; Choinière (yellow card) 87'; Álvarez (yellow card) 90+4'	Stadium: Lower.com Field; Attendance: 20,927; Referee: Tori Penso

May 4 10	Nashville SC	4–1	CF Montréal	Nashville, TN
8:30 PM EDT	Surridge 12', 47', 82'; Zimmerman 21'; Godoy (yellow card) 58'; Muyl (yellow card) 61'	Report	Piette (yellow card) 29'; Zimmerman 65' (o.g.); Wanyama (yellow card) 90'; Zouhir (yellow card) 90+8'	Stadium: Geodis Park; Attendance: 28,600; Referee: Rosendo Mendoza

May 11 11	CF Montréal	2–3	Inter Miami CF	Montreal, QC
7:30 PM EDT	Duke 22'; Vilsaint 32'; Piette (yellow card) 43'	Report	Rojas 44'; Suárez 45+3'; Weigandt (yellow card) 55'; Cremaschi 59'; Busquets (yellow card) 68'	Stadium: Saputo Stadium; Attendance: 19,619; Referee: Drew Fischer

May 15 12	CF Montréal	1–3	Columbus Crew	Montreal, QC
7:30 PM EDT	Choinière (yellow card) 35', (goal) 45+2'; Lassiter (yellow card) 39'	Report	Arfsten 19'; Camacho (yellow card) 41'; Schulte (yellow card) 45+1'; Rossi 59'; Yeboah (yellow card) 77'; Hinestroza 89'	Stadium: Saputo Stadium; Attendance: 19,619; Referee: Mark Allatin

May 18 13	Toronto FC	5–1	CF Montréal	Toronto, ON
7:30 PM EDT	Longstaff 6'; Bernardeschi 12', 58', 60', (yellow card) 90+1'; Owusu 19'	Report	Ibrahim 67'	Stadium: BMO Field; Attendance: 28,261; Referee: Allen Chapman

May 25 14	CF Montréal	0–0	Nashville SC	Montreal, QC
7:30 PM EDT	Lassiter (yellow card) 28'; Sosa (yellow card) 83'; Yankov (yellow card) 90+2'	Report	Godoy (yellow card) 26'	Stadium: Saputo Stadium; Attendance: 19,619; Referee: Timothy Ford

May 29 15	CF Montréal	4–2	D.C. United	Montreal, QC
7:30 PM EDT	Lassiter 6'; Ibrahim 34', 73'; Choinière 38', (yellow card) 58'	Report	Benteke 29', 42'; Peltola (yellow card) 37' (yellow-red card) 45+5'; Dájome (yellow card) 63'	Stadium: Saputo Stadium; Referee: Ismail Elfath

June 1 16	Philadelphia Union	2–2	CF Montréal	Chester, PA
7:30 PM EDT	Gazdag (yellow card) 39', (goal) 56'; Uhre 58'; Elliott (red card) 63'	Report	Ibrahim 1'; Campbell (yellow card) 28'; Yankov (yellow card) 41'; Lassiter (red card) 45'	Stadium: Subaru Park; Attendance: 19,026; Referee: Ted Unkel

June 15 17	CF Montréal	0–0	Real Salt Lake	Montreal, QC
7:30 PM EDT	Yankov (yellow card) 22'; Campbell (yellow card) 49'; Saliba (yellow card) 50'; Cóccaro (yellow card) 63'; Sosa (yellow card) 74'	Report	Luna (yellow card) 72'	Stadium: Saputo Stadium; Attendance: 19,619; Referee: Filip Dujic

June 19 18	CF Montréal	2–2	New York Red Bulls	Montreal, QC
7:30 PM EDT	Ibrahim 11'; Saliba (yellow card) 22'; Opoku 40'; Sosa (yellow card) 86'	Report	Harper (yellow card) 52'; Edelman (yellow card) 60'; Carmona 61'; Eile (yellow card) 76'; Hall 88'	Stadium: Saputo Stadium; Attendance: 19,619; Referee: Lukasz Szpala

June 22 19	Colorado Rapids	4–1	CF Montréal	Commerce City, CO
9:30 PM EDT	Harris 28', 45'; Mihailovic 90'; Navarro 90+2'	Report	Edwards (yellow card) 27'; Abubakar 53' (o.g.); Campbell (yellow card) 89'	Stadium: Dick's Sporting Goods Park; Attendance: 15,583; Referee: Rosendo Mendoza

June 29 20	CF Montréal	4–2	Philadelphia Union	Montreal, QC
7:30 PM EDT	Martínez 36'; Duke 56'; Iankov 89'; Ruan 90+2', (yellow card) 90+3'	Report	Sullivan 29'; Bueno 41'; Glesnes (yellow card) 90+5'	Stadium: Saputo Stadium; Attendance: 19,619; Referee: Jon Freemon

July 3 21	New York City FC	2–0	CF Montréal	New York, NY
7:30 PM EDT	Martínez 9', 56'; Sands (yellow card) 90+3'	Report	Campbell (yellow card) 52'	Stadium: Yankee Stadium; Attendance: 18,209; Referee: Marcos de Oliveira

July 6 22	CF Montréal	1–1	Vancouver Whitecaps FC	Montreal, QC
7:30 PM EDT	Edwards (yellow card) 22'; Cóccaro 79'	Report	White 29'; Raposo (yellow card) 89'	Stadium: Saputo Stadium; Attendance: 19,619; Referee: Guido Gonzales Jr.

July 13 23	CF Montréal	1–0	Atlanta United FC	Montreal, QC
7:30 PM EDT	Ruan 51'; Edwards (yellow card) 53'; Martínez (yellow card) 88'; Saliba (yellow card) 90+4'	Report	Gregersen (yellow card) 38' (yellow-red card) 55'	Stadium: Saputo Stadium; Attendance: 19,619; Referee: Ted Unkel

July 17 24	New York Red Bulls	2–2	CF Montréal	Harrison, NJ
7:30 PM EDT	Carmona 18'; Choinière 75' (o.g.); Nealis (red card) 80'	Report	Piette (yellow card) 43'; Martínez 67', 81'	Stadium: Red Bull Arena; Attendance: 15,128; Referee: Sergii Boiko

July 20 25	CF Montréal	0–1	Toronto FC	Montreal, QC
7:30 PM EDT	Lassiter (yellow card) 30'	Report	Laryea 38', (yellow card) 74'; O'Neill (yellow card) 53'; Petretta (yellow card) 85'	Stadium: Saputo Stadium; Attendance: 19,619; Referee: Armando Villarreal

August 24 26	CF Montréal	0–5	New England Revolution	Montreal, QC
7:30 PM EDT	Duke (yellow card) 82'; Edwards (yellow card) 85'	Report	Wood 7', 37'; Kaye (yellow card) 30'; Lima 71'; Vrioni 79'; Langoni 83'	Stadium: Saputo Stadium; Attendance: 19,619; Referee: Ismir Pekmic

August 31 27	FC Cincinnati	4–1	CF Montréal	Cincinnati, OH
7:30 PM EDT	Robinson (yellow card) 22'; Kelsy 36'; Murphy (yellow card) 40'; Orellano 53', 57'; Santos 71'; Valenzuela (yellow card) 90+7'	Report	Waterman (yellow card) 47'; Opoku 81'; Corbo (yellow card) 86'; Álvarez (yellow card) 90+6'	Stadium: TQL Stadium; Attendance: 25,513; Referee: Jon Freemon

September 14 28	CF Montréal	2–1	Charlotte FC	Montreal, QC
7:30 PM EDT	Clark 23'; Duke 26'	Report	Ream 35'	Stadium: Saputo Stadium; Attendance: 19,619; Referee: Rubiel Vazquez

September 18 29	New England Revolution	2–2	CF Montréal	Foxborough, MA
7:30 PM EDT	Wood 24'; Bajraktarević 35'; Miller (yellow card) 80'; Boateng (yellow card) 86'	Report	Pearce (yellow card) 49', (goal) 54'; Saliba 68'; Marshall-Rutty 72'	Stadium: Gillette Stadium; Attendance: 18,019; Referee: Elijio Arreguin

September 21 30	CF Montréal	2–0	Chicago Fire FC	Montreal, QC
7:30 PM EDT	Martínez 21'; Campbell (yellow card) 40'; Clark 74'	Report		Stadium: Saputo Stadium; Attendance: 19,619; Referee: Lukasz Szpala

September 28 31	CF Montréal	3–0	San Jose Earthquakes	Montreal, QC
7:30 PM EDT	Marshall-Rutty (yellow card) 48'; Martínez 51', 55'; Edwards (yellow card) 52'; Clark 72'; Pearce (yellow card) 90+1'	Report	Gruezo (yellow card) 60'; Yueill (yellow card) 66'; Morales (yellow card) 86'	Stadium: Saputo Stadium; Attendance: 19,619; Referee: Armando Villarreal

October 2 32	Atlanta United FC	1–2	CF Montréal	Atlanta, GA
7:30 PM EDT	Ríos 45+3'; Lennon (yellow card) 55'	Report	Duke (yellow card) 39'; Martínez 43', 76'; Saliba (yellow card) 82'	Stadium: Mercedes-Benz Stadium; Attendance: 42,501; Referee: Ted Unkel

October 5 33	Charlotte FC	2–0	CF Montréal	Charlotte, NC
7:30 PM EDT	Świderski 34'; Tavares (yellow card) 80'; Vargas (yellow card) 83'; Agyemang 90+4'	Report	Edwards (yellow card) 10'; Saliba (yellow card) 73'; Álvarez (yellow card) 85'	Stadium: Bank of America Stadium; Attendance: 38,259; Referee: Victor Rivas

October 19 34	CF Montréal	2–0	New York City FC	Montreal, QC
6:00 PM EDT	Clark 18', (yellow card) 59'; Martínez 45+1'; Waterman (yellow card) 88'	Report	Haak (yellow card) 7'; Parks (yellow card) 69'; Risa (yellow card) 90'	Stadium: Saputo Stadium; Attendance: 19,619; Referee: Allen Chapman

== MLS Cup Playoffs ==
=== Bracket ===
Wild card single match
E8	CF Montréal	2 (4)
E9	Atlanta United FC	2 (5)
W8	Vancouver Whitecaps FC	5
W9	Portland Timbers	0

Round one best-of-three series
E1	Inter Miami CF
E9	Atlanta United FC
E4	Orlando City SC
E5	Charlotte FC
E3	FC Cincinnati
E6	New York City FC
E2	Columbus Crew
E7	New York Red Bulls
W1	Los Angeles FC
W8	Vancouver Whitecaps FC
W4	Seattle Sounders FC
W5	Houston Dynamo FC
W3	Real Salt Lake
W6	Minnesota United FC
W2	LA Galaxy
W7	Colorado Rapids

Conference semifinals single match
Eastern Conference
Western Conference

Conference finals single match

MLS Cup single match

Note: The higher seeded teams host matches, with the MLS Cup host determined by overall points.

=== Results ===
October 22 Wild Card	CF Montréal	2–2 (4–5 p)	Atlanta United FC	Montreal, QC
7:30 PM EDT	Martínez 63', 89' (pen.); Campbell (yellow card) 90+3'	Report	Lennon 29'; Gregersen 44'; McCarty (yellow card) 82'	Stadium: Saputo Stadium; Attendance: 16,566; Referee: Joe Dickerson
	Penalties
	Martínez (penalty scored); Pearce (penalty missed); Saliba (penalty scored); Corbo (penalty scored); Vilsaint (penalty scored)		(penalty scored) McCarty; (penalty scored) Ríos; (penalty scored) Miranchuk; (penalty scored) Williams; (penalty scored) Lobzhanidze

== Leagues Cup ==
=== Group stage ===
==== East 2 ====
Pos	Team	Pld	W	PW	PL	L	GF	GA	GD	Pts	Qualification	ORL	MTL	ASL
1	(United States Soccer Federation) Orlando City SC	2	1	1	0	0	5	2	+3	5	Advance to knockout stage	—	4–1	1–1
2	(Canadian Soccer Association) CF Montréal	2	1	0	0	1	4	6	−2	3	Advance to knockout stage	—	—	—
3	(Mexican Football Federation) Atlético San Luis	2	0	0	1	1	3	4	−1	1		—	2–3	—

Source: Leagues Cup
Rules for classification: Tiebreakers

July 26 Group stage	Orlando City SC (United States)	4–1	(Canada) CF Montréal	Orlando, FL
8:00 PM EDT	Þórhallsson 7'; Torres 37'; Enrique 45+2'; Ojeda 57'	Report	Cóccaro (yellow card) 56'; Martínez 69'	Stadium: Inter&Co Stadium; Attendance: 16,033; Referee: Adonai Escobedo

July 30 Group stage	Atlético San Luis (Mexico)	2–3	(Canada) CF Montréal	Montreal, QC
7:00 PM EDT	Boli 77' (pen.); Bonatini (yellow card) 87'; Damm 90+12' (pen.)	Report	Pearce 17'; Cóccaro 27'; Ibrahim 82'; Corbo (yellow card) 87'; Choinière (yellow card) 90+3'	Stadium: Saputo Stadium; Attendance: 17,314; Referee: Juan Calderon Perez

=== Knockout stage ===
August 9 Round of 32	Philadelphia Union (United States)	2–0	(Canada) CF Montréal	Chester, PA
19:30	Baribo 45+1', 90+6'; Wagner (yellow card) 69'; Mbaizo (yellow card) 87'	Report		Stadium: Subaru Park; Referee: Daniel Quintero (Mexico)

== Canadian Championship ==
=== Bracket ===
Preliminary round single match
Foothills County, AB
CPL	Cavalry FC	1
CPL	Vancouver FC	0
Langford, BC
CPL	Pacific FC (p)	1 (5)
L1BC	TSS FC Rovers	1 (4)
Ottawa, ON
CPL	Atlético Ottawa	7
CPL	Valour FC	0
Toronto (BMO), ON
MLS	Toronto FC	5
L1O	Simcoe County Rovers FC	0
Halifax, NS
CPL	HFX Wanderers FC	2 (3)
L1Q	CS Saint-Laurent (p)	2 (5)
Hamilton, ON
CPL	Forge FC	3
CPL	York United FC	1

Quarter-finals two-legged tie
MLS	Vancouver Whitecaps FC (a)	2	0	2
CPL	Cavalry FC	1	1	2
CPL	Pacific FC	0	2	2
CPL	Atlético Ottawa	0	1	1
MLS	Toronto FC	3	8	11
L1Q	CS Saint-Laurent	0	1	1
MLS	CF Montréal	1	1	2
CPL	Forge FC	1	2	3

Semi-finals two-legged tie
MLS	Vancouver Whitecaps FC	1	1	2
CPL	Pacific FC	0	0	0
MLS	Toronto FC (a)	1	1	2
CPL	Forge FC	2	0	2

Final single match
Vancouver, BC
MLS	Vancouver Whitecaps FC (p)	0 (4)
MLS	Toronto FC	0 (2)

=== Quarter-finals ===
May 7 First leg	Forge FC	1–1	CF Montréal	Hamilton, Ontario
11:00am	Choinière 31'; Parra (yellow card) 54'	Report	Iliadis (yellow card) 9'; Jabang (yellow card) 28'; Waterman (yellow card) 51'; Duke 52'; Álvarez (yellow card) 72'	Stadium: Tim Hortons Field; Attendance: 14,923; Referee: Renzo Villanueva

May 22 Second leg	CF Montréal	1–2 (2–3 agg.)	Forge FC	Montreal, Quebec
7:30pm	Wanyama 65'; Campbell (yellow card) 77'	Report	Parra 14', (yellow card) 48'; Poku 24'; Choinière (yellow card) 65'; Duncan (yellow card) 69'	Stadium: Saputo Stadium; Attendance: 7,582; Referee: Marie-Soleil Beaudoin

== Statistics ==
=== Appearances, minutes played, and goals scored ===
No.	Nat.	Player	Total			Major League Soccer			Canadian Championship			Leagues Cup			MLS Cup Playoffs			Ref.
No.	Nat.	Player	App.	Min.	Gls	App.	Min.	Gls	App.	Min.	Gls	App.	Min.	Gls	App.	Min.	Gls	Ref.
Goalkeepers
1	(Canada)	Sebastian Breza	4	360	0	1	90	0	2	180	0	1	90	0	0	0	0	
33	(United States)	Logan Ketterer	0	0	0	0	0	0	0	0	0	0	0	0	0	0	0	
40	(Canada)	Jonathan Sirois	36	3240	0	33	2970	0	0	0	0	2	180	0	1	90	0	
Defenders
3	(Uruguay)	Joaquín Sosa	23	1472	0	19	1273	0	1	45	0	3	149	0	0	0	0	
4	(Colombia)	Fernando Álvarez	33	2530	1	27	2139	1	2	135	0	3	166	0	1	90	0	
11	(Canada)	Jahkeele Marshall-Rutty	10	739	0	9	649	0	0	0	0	0	0	0	1	90	0	
16	(Canada)	Joel Waterman	30	2581	0	24	2131	0	1	90	0	3	270	0	1	90	0	
24	(United States)	George Campbell	31	2422	0	28	2198	0	2	135	0	0	0	0	1	89	0	
25	(Italy)	Gabriele Corbo	33	2067	0	28	1720	0	1	90	0	3	256	0	1	1	0	
27	(Poland)	Dawid Bugaj	8	300	0	5	161	0	0	0	0	3	139	0	0	0	0	
44	(Canada)	Raheem Edwards	28	1669	0	25	1554	0	1	28	0	1	28	0	1	59	0	
46	(England)	Tom Pearce	12	445	2	8	248	1	0	0	0	3	167	1	1	31	0	
Midfielders
2	(Kenya)	Victor Wanyama	14	615	1	12	401	0	2	169	1	1	45	0	0	0	0	
6	(Canada)	Samuel Piette	31	2354	1	27	2149	1	1	11	0	2	135	0	1	59	0	
8	(Bulgaria)	Dominik Yankov	23	765	2	21	692	2	1	45	0	1	28	0	0	0	0	
10	(United States)	Bryce Duke	38	2530	4	32	2143	3	2	135	1	3	171	0	1	81	0	
19	(Canada)	Nathan Saliba	27	1856	1	24	1650	1	0	0	0	2	116	0	1	90	0	
23	(United States)	Caden Clark	10	734	4	9	675	4	0	0	0	0	0	0	1	59	0	
38	(Canada)	Alessandro Biello	4	33	0	2	15	0	2	18	0	0	0	0	0	0	0	
Forwards
7	(Ghana)	Kwadwo Opoku	19	605	2	16	515	2	0	0	0	2	59	0	1	31	0	
9	(Uruguay)	Matías Cóccaro	25	1143	5	22	904	4	0	0	0	3	239	1	0	0	0	
14	(Nigeria)	Sunusi Ibrahim	31	1269	7	25	999	6	2	180	0	3	81	1	1	9	0	
17	(Venezuela)	Josef Martínez	26	1576	14	23	1373	11	0	0	0	2	113	1	1	90	2	
21	(Finland)	Lassi Lappalainen	11	324	0	11	324	0	0	0	0	0	0	0	0	0	0	
28	(Canada)	Jules-Anthony Vilsaint	21	921	2	19	845	2	1	45	0	0	0	0	1	31	0	
No Longer with the Club
5	(Greece)	Ilias Iliadis	2	90	0	0	0	0	2	90	0	0	0	0	0	0	0	
11	(Costa Rica)	Ariel Lassiter	25	1853	3	19	1598	3	2	90	0	3	165	0	0	0	0	
13	(United States)	Mason Toye	13	520	1	12	475	1	1	45	0	0	0	0	0	0	0	
18	(Canada)	Rida Zouhir	9	350	0	7	171	0	2	179	0	0	0	0	0	0	0	
22	(Brazil)	Ruan	28	2154	2	25	2006	2	1	45	0	2	103	0	0	0	0	
23	(United States)	Ousman Jabang	2	47	0	1	2	0	1	45	0	0	0	0	0	0	0	
27	(United States)	Grayson Doody	0	0	0	0	0	0	0	0	0	0	0	0	0	0	0	
29	(Canada)	Mathieu Choinière	22	1949	2	17	1499	2	2	180	0	3	270	0	0	0	0	
Last updated: November 7, 2024

=== Top scorers ===
Rank	Nat.	Player	Pos.	MLS	Canadian Championship	Leagues Cup	MLS Cup Playoffs	TOTAL
1	(Venezuela)	Josef Martínez	FW	11		1	2	14
2	(Nigeria)	Sunusi Ibrahim	FW	6		1		7
3	(United States)	Caden Clark	MF	4				4
3	(Uruguay)	Matías Cóccaro	FW	4		1		5
5	(United States)	Bryce Duke	MF	3	1			4
6	(Costa Rica)	Ariel Lassiter	MF	3				3
7	(Canada)	Jules-Anthony Vilsaint	FW	2				2
7	(Canada)	Mathieu Choinière	MF	2				2
7	(Bulgaria)	Dominik Yankov	MF	2				2
7	(Brazil)	Ruan	DF	2				2
7	(Ghana)	Kwadwo Opoku	FW	2				2
7	(England)	Tom Pearce	DF	1		1		2
13	(Colombia)	Fernando Álvarez	DF	1				1
13	(United States)	Mason Toye	FW	1				1
13	(Canada)	Samuel Piette	MF	1				1
13	(Canada)	Nathan Saliba	MF	1				1
13	(Kenya)	Victor Wanyama	MF		1			1
Totals				46	2	4	2	54

Updated to match played November 7, 2024
Italic: denotes player left the club during the season.

=== Top assists ===
Rank	Nat.	Player	Pos.	MLS	Canadian Championship	Leagues Cup	MLS Cup Playoffs	TOTAL
1	(Costa Rica)	Ariel Lassiter	FW	7		1		8
2	(United States)	Bryce Duke	MF	5	1	1		7
3	(Brazil)	Ruan	DF	5		1		6
4	(Canada)	Raheem Edwards	DF	5				5
5	(United States)	Caden Clark	MF	4				4
6	(Venezuela)	Josef Martínez	FW	3				3
6	(United States)	George Campbell	DF	3				3
6	(Canada)	Mathieu Choinière	MF	3				3
6	(Canada)	Jules-Anthony Vilsaint	FW	3				3
6	(Ghana)	Kwadwo Opoku	FW	3				3
11	(Bulgaria)	Dominik Yankov	MF	2				2
11	(Canada)	Samuel Piette	MF	2				2
11	(England)	Tom Pearce	DF	1		1		2
14	(Canada)	Jahkeele Marshall-Rutty	DF	1				1
14	(Uruguay)	Matías Cóccaro	FW	1				1
14	(Canada)	Nathan Saliba	MF	1				1
14	(Nigeria)	Sunusi Ibrahim	FW	1				1
14	(Poland)	Dawid Bugaj	DF	1				1
14	(Italy)	Gabriele Corbo	DF	1				1
14	(Finland)	Lassi Lappalainen	FW	1				1
14	(Colombia)	Fernando Álvarez	DF	1				1
14	(Canada)	Rida Zouhir	MF		1			1
Totals				53	2	4	0	59

Updated to match played October 21, 2024
Italic: denotes player left the club during the season.

=== Goals against average ===
No.	Nat.	Player	Total			Major League Soccer			Canadian Championship			Leagues Cup			MLS Cup Playoffs		
No.	Nat.	Player	MIN	GA	GAA	MIN	GA	GAA	MIN	GA	GAA	MIN	GA	GAA	MIN	GA	GAA
1	CAN	Sebastian Breza	360	9	2.25	90	2	2.00	180	3	1.50	90	4	4.00	0	0	0.00
33	USA	Logan Ketterer	0	0	0.00	0	0	0.00	0	0	0.00	0	0	0.00	0	0	0.00
40	CAN	Jonathan Sirois	3240	68	1.89	2970	62	1.88	0	0	0.00	180	4	2.00	90	2	2.00

Updated to match played November 7, 2024
Source: CF Montréal
Italic: denotes player left the club during the season.

=== Clean sheets ===
No.	Nat.	Player	MLS	Canadian Championship	Leagues Cup	MLS Cup Playoffs	TOTAL
1	(Canada)	Sebastian Breza					0
33	(United States)	Logan Ketterer					0
40	(Canada)	Jonathan Sirois	8				8
Totals			8	0	0	0	8

Updated to match played October 21, 2024
Source: MLSsoccer.com
Italic: denotes player left the club during the season.

=== Top minutes played ===
No.	Nat.	Player	Pos.	MLS	Canadian Championship	Leagues Cup	MLS Cup Playoffs	TOTAL
40	(Canada)	Jonathan Sirois	GK	2970	0	180	90	3240
16	(Canada)	Joel Waterman	DF	2131	90	270	90	2581
4	(Colombia)	Fernando Álvarez	DF	2139	135	166	90	2530
10	(United States)	Bryce Duke	MF	2143	135	171	81	2530
24	(United States)	George Campbell	DF	2198	135	0	89	2422
6	(Canada)	Samuel Piette	MF	2149	11	135	59	2354
22	(Brazil)	Ruan	DF	2006	45	103	0	2154
25	(Italy)	Gabriele Corbo	DF	1720	90	256	1	2067
29	(Canada)	Mathieu Choinière	MF	1499	180	270	0	1949
19	(Canada)	Nathan Saliba	MF	1650	0	116	90	1856

Updated to match played November 29, 2024
Source: Montreal Impact
Italic: denotes player left the club during the season.

=== Yellow and red cards ===
No.	Player	Total			Major League Soccer			Canadian Championship			Leagues Cup			Ref.
No.	Player	Booked	(yellow card) (red card)	Sent off (straight red)	Booked	(yellow card) (red card)	Sent off (straight red)	Booked	(yellow card) (red card)	Sent off (straight red)	Booked	(yellow card) (red card)	Sent off (straight red)	Ref.
1	Sebastian Breza	0	0	0	0	0	0	0	0	0	0	0	0	
2	Victor Wanyama	1	0	0	1	0	0	0	0	0	0	0	0	
3	Joaquín Sosa	4	0	0	4	0	0	0	0	0	0	0	0	
4	Fernando Álvarez	4	0	0	3	0	0	1	0	0	0	0	0	
6	Samuel Piette	5	0	0	5	0	0	0	0	0	0	0	0	
7	Kwadwo Opoku	0	0	0	0	0	0	0	0	0	0	0	0	
8	Dominik Yankov	4	0	0	4	0	0	0	0	0	0	0	0	
9	Matías Cóccaro	3	0	0	2	0	0	0	0	0	1	0	0	
10	Bryce Duke	2	0	0	2	0	0	0	0	0	0	0	0	
11	Jahkeele Marshall-Rutty	2	0	0	2	0	0	0	0	0	0	0	0	
14	Sunusi Ibrahim	0	0	0	0	0	0	0	0	0	0	0	0	
16	Joel Waterman	7	0	0	6	0	0	1	0	0	0	0	0	
17	Josef Martínez	2	0	0	2	0	0	0	0	0	0	0	0	
19	Nathan Saliba	6	1	0	6	1	0	0	0	0	0	0	0	
21	Lassi Lappalainen	0	0	0	0	0	0	0	0	0	0	0	0	
23	Caden Clark	1	0	0	1	0	0	0	0	0	0	0	0	
24	George Campbell	9	0	0	8	0	0	1	0	0	0	0	0	
25	Gabriele Corbo	2	0	0	1	0	0	0	0	0	1	0	0	
27	Dawid Bugaj	0	0	0	0	0	0	0	0	0	0	0	0	
28	Jules-Anthony Vilsaint	1	0	0	1	0	0	0	0	0	0	0	0	
33	Logan Ketterer	0	0	0	0	0	0	0	0	0	0	0	0	
38	Alessandro Biello	0	0	0	0	0	0	0	0	0	0	0	0	
40	Jonathan Sirois	1	0	0	1	0	0	0	0	0	0	0	0	
44	Raheem Edwards	8	0	1	8	0	1	0	0	0	0	0	0	
46	Tom Pearce	2	0	0	2	0	0	0	0	0	0	0	0	
	Mathieu Choinière	6	0	0	5	0	0	0	0	0	1	0	0	
	Ilias Iliadis	1	0	0	0	0	0	1	0	0	0	0	0	
	Ariel Lassiter	5	0	1	5	0	1	0	0	0	0	0	0	
	Mason Toye	0	0	0	0	0	0	0	0	0	0	0	0	
	Rida Zouhir	2	0	0	2	0	0	0	0	0	0	0	0	
	Ruan	1	0	0	1	0	0	0	0	0	0	0	0	
	Ousman Jabang	1	0	0	0	0	0	1	0	0	0	0	0	
	Grayson Doody	0	0	0	0	0	0	0	0	0	0	0	0	
Totals		80	1	2	72	1	2	5	0	0	3	0	0	
Last updated: October 21, 2024

== Recognition ==
=== MLS team of the Week ===
Week	Player	Nation	Position	Report
3	Sirois	Canada	BN	MLS team of the Week: 3
4	Álvarez	Colombia	DF	MLS team of the Week: 4
4	Choinière	Canada	BN	MLS team of the Week: 4
4	Courtois	France	Coach	MLS team of the Week: 4
5	Cóccaro	Uruguay	BN	MLS team of the Week: 5
9	Martínez	Venezuela	BN	MLS team of the Week: 9
11	Sirois	Canada	BN	MLS team of the Week: 11
16	Waterman	Canada	DF	MLS team of the Week: 16
17	Ibrahim	Nigeria	FW	MLS team of the Week: 17
17	Lassiter	Costa Rica	BN	MLS team of the Week: 17
20	Waterman	Canada	BN	MLS team of the Week: 20
20	Sirois	Canada	BN	MLS team of the Week: 20
23	Duke	United States	MF	MLS team of the Week: 23
26	Ruan	Brazil	DF	MLS team of the Week: 26
26	Campbell	United States	BN	MLS team of the Week: 26
32	Clark	United States	MF	MLS team of the Week: 32
33	Saliba	Canada	MF	MLS team of the Week: 33
34	Clark	United States	BN	MLS team of the Week: 34
35	Martínez	Venezuela	FW	MLS team of the Week: 35
35	Clark	United States	BN	MLS team of the Week: 35
36	Martínez	Venezuela	FW	MLS team of the Week: 36
38	Clark	United States	MF	MLS team of the Week: 38

=== MLS All-Star ===
Player	Nation	Position	Report
Choinière	Canada	MF	MLS All Star
