= 2022–23 Bologna FC 1909 season =

Bologna
2022–23 season
- Chairman: Joey Saputo
- Head coach: Siniša Mihajlović (until 6 September); Luca Vigiani (interim, from 6 September to 11 September); Thiago Motta (from 12 September)
- Stadium: Stadio Renato Dall'Ara
- Serie A: 9th
- Coppa Italia: Round of 16
- Top goalscorer: League: Riccardo Orsolini (11); All: Riccardo Orsolini (11)
Home colours	Away colours	Third colours

The 2022–23 season was the 113th season in the history of Bologna FC 1909 and their eighth consecutive season in the top flight. The club participated in Serie A and the Coppa Italia.

== Players ==
As of 31 January 2023

Note: Flags indicate national team as defined under FIFA eligibility rules; some limited exceptions apply. Players may hold more than one non-FIFA nationality.

No.	Pos.	Nation	Player
1	GK	ITA	Francesco Bardi
3	DF	AUT	Stefan Posch (on loan from Hoffenheim)
4	DF	URU	Joaquín Sosa
5	DF	FRA	Adama Soumaoro
6	MF	CRO	Nikola Moro (on loan from Dynamo Moscow)
7	FW	ITA	Riccardo Orsolini
8	MF	ARG	Nicolás Domínguez
9	FW	AUT	Marko Arnautović
10	FW	ITA	Nicola Sansone
11	FW	NED	Joshua Zirkzee
12	GK	ITA	Francesco Raffaelli
14	DF	ITA	Kevin Bonifazi
17	MF	CHI	Gary Medel
18	FW	ITA	Antonio Raimondo
19	MF	SCO	Lewis Ferguson
20	MF	SUI	Michel Aebischer

No.	Pos.	Nation	Player
21	MF	ITA	Roberto Soriano (captain)
22	DF	GRE	Charalampos Lykogiannis
23	GK	ITA	Nicola Bagnolini
24	DF	ITA	Riccardo Stivanello
25	MF	FIN	Niklas Pyyhtiä
26	DF	COL	Jhon Lucumí
28	GK	POL	Łukasz Skorupski
29	DF	ITA	Lorenzo De Silvestri (vice-captain)
30	MF	NED	Jerdy Schouten
34	GK	ITA	Federico Ravaglia
39	DF	ITA	Mattia Motolese
50	DF	ITA	Andrea Cambiaso (on loan from Juventus)
66	DF	ITA	Wisdom Amey
77	DF	GRE	Giorgos Kyriakopoulos (on loan from Sassuolo)
82	MF	POL	Kacper Urbański
99	FW	GAM	Musa Barrow

=== Other players under contract ===
As of 28 January 2023

Note: Flags indicate national team as defined under FIFA eligibility rules; some limited exceptions apply. Players may hold more than one non-FIFA nationality.

No.	Pos.	Nation	Player
—	DF	ITA	Gabriele Corbo
—	FW	NGR	Orji Okwonkwo

No.	Pos.	Nation	Player
—	FW	ITA	Mattia Pagliuca

=== Out on loan ===
As of 31 January 2023

Note: Flags indicate national team as defined under FIFA eligibility rules; some limited exceptions apply. Players may hold more than one non-FIFA nationality.

No.	Pos.	Nation	Player
—	GK	CAN	Sebastian Breza (at Carrarese until 30 June 2023)
—	DF	ITA	Matteo Angeli (at Renate until 30 June 2023)
—	DF	GHA	Ebenezer Annan (at Imolese until 30 June 2023)
—	DF	ENG	Luis Binks (at Como until 30 June 2023)
—	DF	NED	Denso Kasius (at Rapid Wien until 30 June 2023)
—	MF	ISL	Andri Baldursson (at NEC Nijmegen until 30 June 2023)

No.	Pos.	Nation	Player
—	MF	ITA	Dion Ruffo Luci (at Turris until 30 June 2023)
—	MF	NGR	Kingsley Michael (at SV Ried until 30 June 2023)
—	FW	ITA	Gianmarco Cangiano (at Fortuna Sittard until 30 June 2023)
—	FW	GAM	Musa Juwara (at OB until 31 December 2023)
—	FW	NED	Sydney van Hooijdonk (at Heerenveen until 30 June 2023)
—	FW	ITA	Emanuel Vignato (at Empoli until 30 June 2024)

== Pre-season and friendlies ==
Win Draw Loss

10 July 2022 Friendly	Bologna (Italy)	8–0	(Italy) Settaurense	Pinzolo
17:30 CEST (UTC+2)	Van Hooijdonk 3', 6'; Soriano 8'; De Silvestri 21'; Pyyhtiä 65'; Paananen 68'; Angeli 78'; Mbaye 83'	Report		Stadium: Campo Sportivo Comunale Pineta; Referee: Luca Selvatici

17 July 2022 Friendly	ASD Pinzolo (Italy)	0–5	(Italy) Bologna	Pinzolo
16:00 CEST (UTC+2)		Report	Barrow 8', 28', 45'; Arnautović 60'; Aebischer 63'	Stadium: Campo Sportivo Comunale Pineta; Referee: Alessandro Pizzi

17 July 2022 Friendly	Bologna (Italy)	7–1	(Italy) Castiglione	Pinzolo
17:30 CEST (UTC+2)	Orsolini 18' (pen.), 37'; De Silvestri 27'; Vignato 31'; Anatriello 56', 58'; Paananen 57'	Report	Lauricella 43'	Stadium: Campo Sportivo Comunale Pineta; Referee: Davide Cerea

24 July 2022 Friendly	AZ (Netherlands)	1–0	(Italy) Bologna	Alkmaar, Netherlands
17:00 CEST (UTC+2)	Buurmeester 41'	Report		Stadium: AFAS Stadion; Attendance: 3,000; Referee: Clay Ruperti (Netherlands)

29 July 2022 Friendly	Twente (Netherlands)	4–1	(Italy) Bologna	Enschede, Netherlands
19:00 CEST (UTC+2)	Rots 2'; Misidjan (yellow card) 30'; Brenet 32'; Vlap 36'; Smal 47'; Pleguezuelo (yellow card) 58'; Zerrouki (yellow card) 72'	Report	Medel (yellow card) 31'; Soumaoro 45'; Domínguez (yellow card) 57'	Stadium: De Grolsch Veste; Referee: Marc Nagtegaal (Netherlands)

9 December 2022 Friendly	Bologna (Italy)	9–0	(Austria) Kapfenberger SV	Bologna
14:00 CET (UTC+1)	Lykogiannis 16'; Domínguez 17'; Sansone 24'; Cambiaso 49'; Ferguson 50'; Vignato 60'; Arnautović 61'; Barrow 68'; Lucumi 82'	Report		Stadium: Centro tecnico Niccolò Galli; Referee: Maria Sole Ferrieri Caputi

14 December 2022 Friendly	Mallorca (Spain)	1–2	(Italy) Bologna	Palma
18:00 CET (UTC+1)	Kadewere 54'	Report	Arnautović 21'; Orsolini 59'	Stadium: Estadi Son Bibiloni; Referee: Luis Bestard Servera

22 December 2022 Friendly	Hellas Verona (Italy)	0–1	(Italy) Bologna	Verona
14:30 CET (UTC+1)		Report	Orsolini 44'	Stadium: Stadio Marcantonio Bentegodi; Referee: Daniele Perenzoni

== Competitions ==
=== Overall record ===
Competition	First match	Last match	Starting round	Final position	Record							
Competition	First match	Last match	Starting round	Final position	Pld	W	D	L	GF	GA	GD	Win %
Serie A	14 August 2022	4 June 2023	Matchday 1	9th	38	14	12	12	53	49	+4	36.84
Coppa Italia	8 August 2022	19 January 2023	Round of 64	Round of 16	3	2	0	1	2	1	+1	66.67
Total					41	16	12	13	55	50	+5	39.02

Source: Soccerway

=== Serie A ===
==== League table ====
Pos	Team	Pld	W	D	L	GF	GA	GD	Pts	Qualification or relegation
7	Juventus (Note: Juventus were excluded from UEFA competitions due to violation of UEFA's financial regulations.)	38	22	6	10	56	33	+23	62 (Note: Juventus were deducted 10 points as punishment for capital gain violations.)	
8	Fiorentina	38	15	11	12	53	43	+10	56	Qualification for the Εuropa Conference League play-off round
9	Bologna	38	14	12	12	53	49	+4	54	
10	Torino	38	14	11	13	42	41	+1	53	
11	Monza	38	14	10	14	48	52	−4	52	

Source: Serie A
Rules for classification: 1) Points; 2) Tiebreaker for Champions team and third relegated team; 3) Head-to-head points; 4) Head-to-head goal difference; 5) Goal difference; 6) Goals scored; 7) Draw. (Note: Head-to-head record is used only after all the matches between the teams in question have been played)

==== Results summary ====
Overall								Home						Away					
Pld	W	D	L	GF	GA	GD	Pts	W	D	L	GF	GA	GD	W	D	L	GF	GA	GD
38	14	12	12	53	49	+4	54	7	9	3	24	14	+10	7	3	9	29	35	−6

Source: Serie A

==== Results by round ====
Round	1	2	3	4	5	6	7	8	9	10	11	12	13	14	15	16	17	18	19	20	21	22	23	24	25	26	27	28	29	30	31	32	33	34	35	36	37	38
Ground	A	H	A	H	A	H	H	A	H	A	H	A	H	A	H	A	H	A	H	H	A	H	A	H	A	H	A	H	A	H	A	H	A	A	H	A	H	A
Result	L	D	L	D	D	W	L	L	D	L	W	W	W	L	W	L	L	W	D	W	W	L	W	W	L	D	D	W	W	D	L	D	L	D	D	W	D	W
Position	12	12	16	16	16	12	16	17	17	17	13	12	12	13	11	11	11	11	12	9	9	11	8	8	8	9	10	8	8	8	8	8	10	10	11	9	11	9

Source: Serie A
A = Away; H = Home; W = Win; D = Draw; L = Loss

==== Matches ====
The league fixtures were announced on 24 June 2022.

14 August 2022 1	Lazio	2–1	Bologna	Rome
18:30 CEST (UTC+2)	Maximiano (red card) 6'; De Silvestri 68' (o.g.); Lazzari (yellow card) 71'; Immobile 79', (yellow card) 90'	Report	Sansone (yellow card) 23'; Arnautović 38' (pen.), (yellow card) 39'; Soumaoro (yellow card) 40' (yellow-red card) 45+3'; Cambiaso (yellow card) 53'; Aebischer (yellow card) 86'	Stadium: Stadio Olimpico; Attendance: 45,000; Referee: Luca Massimi

21 August 2022 2	Bologna	1–1	Hellas Verona	Bologna
20:45 CEST (UTC+2)	Arnautović 21', (yellow card) 90'; Bonifazi (yellow card) 53'; Orsolini (red card) 78'; Domínguez (yellow card) 87'	Report	Hongla (yellow card) 23'; Coppola (yellow card) 26'; Henry 43'; Günter (yellow card) 47'	Stadium: Stadio Renato Dall'Ara; Attendance: 17,725; Referee: Matteo Marcenaro

27 August 2022 3	Milan	2–0	Bologna	Milan
20:45 CEST (UTC+2)	Leão 21'; Giroud 58'; Calabria (yellow card) 66'; Adli (yellow card) 86'	Report	Schouten (yellow card) 56'	Stadium: San Siro; Attendance: 70,430; Referee: Gianluca Manganiello

1 September 2022 4	Bologna	1–1	Salernitana	Bologna
20:45 CEST (UTC+2)	Arnautović 52' (pen.); Medel (yellow card) 64'; De Silvestri (yellow card) 65'	Report	Gyömbér (yellow card) 50'; Vilhena (yellow card) 82'; Dia 88'	Stadium: Stadio Renato Dall'Ara; Attendance: 19,787; Referee: Davide Ghersini

4 September 2022 5	Spezia	2–2	Bologna	La Spezia
15:00 CEST (UTC+2)	Holm (yellow card) 38'; Bastoni 45+2', (yellow card) 56'; Schouten 54' (o.g.); Sala (yellow card) 90+1'; Nikolaou (yellow card) 90+6'	Report	Arnautović 7', 64'; Zirkzee (yellow card) 90+6'	Stadium: Stadio Alberto Picco; Attendance: 18,000; Referee: Antonio Giua

11 September 2022 6	Bologna	2–1	Fiorentina	Bologna
15:00 CEST (UTC+2)	Barrow 59'; Arnautović 62'; Lykogiannis (yellow card) 87'	Report	Kouamé (yellow card) 46'; Amrabat (yellow card) 50'; Martínez Quarta 54'; Igor (yellow card) 90+1' (yellow-red card) 90+7'	Stadium: Stadio Renato Dall'Ara; Attendance: 18,901; Referee: Daniele Orsato

17 September 2022 7	Bologna	0–1	Empoli	Bologna
15:00 CEST (UTC+2)	Kasius (yellow card) 90+3'; Domínguez (yellow card) 90+5'	Report	Bandinelli 75'; Grassi (yellow card) 89'; Henderson (yellow card) 90+2'; Fazzini (yellow card) 90+6'	Stadium: Stadio Renato Dall'Ara; Attendance: 15,670; Referee: Manuel Volpi

2 October 2022 8	Juventus	3–0	Bologna	Turin
20:45 CEST (UTC+2)	Kostić 24'; Vlahović 59'; Milik 62'	Report	Sosa (yellow card) 90+2'	Stadium: Juventus Stadium; Attendance: 34,662; Referee: Rosario Abisso

8 October 2022 9	Bologna	1–1	Sampdoria	Bologna
20:45 CEST (UTC+2)	Domínguez 32'; Cambiaso (yellow card) 61'; Orsolini (yellow card) 70'	Report	Đuričić (yellow card) 24', (goal) 72'; Léris (yellow card) 74'; Verre (yellow card) 89'	Stadium: Stadio Renato Dall'Ara; Attendance: 20,871; Referee: Marco Piccinini

16 October 2022 10	Napoli	3–2	Bologna	Naples
18:00 CEST (UTC+2)	Juan Jesus 45'; Lozano 49'; Osimhen 69'	Report	Domínguez (yellow card) 21'; Zirkzee 41'; Barrow 51'; Skorupski (yellow card) 58'; Sansone (yellow card) 90+1'; Lykogiannis (yellow card) 90+3'	Stadium: Stadio Diego Armando Maradona; Attendance: 45,599; Referee: Francesco Cosso

23 October 2022 11	Bologna	2–0	Lecce	Bologna
15:00 CEST (UTC+2)	Arnautović 13' (pen.), (yellow card) 90+6'; Lucumí (yellow card) 30'; Ferguson 35', (yellow card) 47'; Barrow (yellow card) 45+2'; Medel (yellow card) 88'	Report	Hjulmand (yellow card) 65'; Baschirotto (yellow card) 90+6'	Stadium: Stadio Renato Dall'Ara; Attendance: 24,206; Referee: Simone Sozza

31 October 2022 12	Monza	1–2	Bologna	Monza
20:45 CET (UTC+1)	Marlon (yellow card) 52'; Sensi (yellow card) 55'; Petagna 57' (pen.); Rovella (yellow card) 62'; D'Alessandro (yellow card) 64'	Report	Aebischer (yellow card) 3'; Medel (yellow card) 52'; Ferguson 60'; Orsolini 73'	Stadium: Stadio Brianteo; Attendance: 11,388; Referee: Luca Pairetto

6 November 2022 13	Bologna	2–1	Torino	Bologna
12:30 CET (UTC+1)	Lukumí (yellow card) 24'; Orsolini 64'; Posch 77'; Vignato (yellow card) 77'; Skorupski (yellow card) 90+5'	Report	Lukić 26' (pen.); Milinković-Savić (yellow card) 73'; Ricci (yellow card) 85'; Vojvoda (yellow card) 90+3'	Stadium: Stadio Renato Dall'Ara; Attendance: 23,168; Referee: Antonio Giua

9 November 2022 14	Internazionale	6–1	Bologna	Milan
20:45 CET (UTC+1)	Džeko 26'; Dimarco 36', 48'; Martínez (yellow card) 35', (goal) 42'; Çalhanoğlu 59' (pen.); Gosens 76'	Report	Lykogiannis 22'; Arnautović (yellow card) 32'; Lucumí (yellow card) 33'; Medel (yellow card) 35'; Orsolini (yellow card) 54'; Sosa (yellow card) 59'	Stadium: San Siro; Attendance: 69,312; Referee: Andrea Colombo

12 November 2022 15	Bologna	3–0	Sassuolo	Bologna
20:45 CET (UTC+1)	Soumaoro (yellow card) 16'; Aebischer 30'; Arnautović 50'; Ferguson 78'	Report		Stadium: Stadio Renato Dall'Ara; Attendance: 20,811; Referee: Ivano Pezzuto

4 January 2023 16	Roma	1–0	Bologna	Rome
16:30 CET (UTC+1)	Pellegrini 6' (pen.); Ibañez (yellow card) 33'; Çelik (yellow card) 76'	Report	Ferguson (yellow card) 69'; Aebischer (yellow card) 85'; Domínguez (yellow card) 90+7'	Stadium: Stadio Olimpico; Attendance: 62,092; Referee: Alberto Santoro

9 January 2023 17	Bologna	1–2	Atalanta	Bologna
20:45 CET (UTC+1)	Orsolini 6'; Medel (yellow card) 66'; Lykogiannis (yellow card) 84'; Domínguez (yellow card) 90+4'	Report	De Roon (yellow card) 26'; Pašalić (yellow card) 38'; Koopmeiners 47'; Højlund 58'	Stadium: Stadio Renato Dall'Ara; Attendance: 16,953; Referee: Marco Di Bello

15 January 2023 18	Udinese	1–2	Bologna	Udine
15:00 CET (UTC+1)	Beto 10'; Walace (yellow card) 57'	Report	Lucumí (yellow card) 41'; Sansone 59'; Soriano (yellow card) 75'; Posch 80'; Ferguson (yellow card) 90+1'	Stadium: Stadio Friuli; Attendance: 20,486; Referee: Manuel Volpi

23 January 2023 19	Bologna	1–1	Cremonese	Bologna
18:30 CET (UTC+1)	Chiricheș 55' (o.g.); Soumaoro (yellow card) 67'; Skorupski (yellow card) 82'	Report	Chiricheș (yellow card) 24'; Okereke 50' (pen.); Pickel (yellow card) 84'; Vásquez (yellow card) 86'; Carnesecchi (yellow card) 87'; Buonaiuto (yellow card) 90+1'	Stadium: Stadio Renato Dall'Ara; Attendance: 15,587; Referee: Matteo Marchetti

27 January 2023 20	Bologna	2–0	Spezia	Bologna
18:30 CET (UTC+1)	Posch 37', (yellow card) 83'; Soumaoro (yellow card) 61'; Orsolini 77'	Report	Gyasi (yellow card) 87'; Esposito (yellow card) 88'	Stadium: Stadio Renato Dall'Ara; Attendance: 17,123; Referee: Luca Massimi

5 February 2023 21	Fiorentina	1–2	Bologna	Florence
18:00 CET (UTC+1)	Saponara 19'; Igor (yellow card) 29'; Mandragora (yellow card) 82'	Report	Orsolini 14', (yellow card) 18'; Posch 47'; Schouten (yellow card) 53'; Domínguez (yellow card) 67'; Lucumí (yellow card) 76'	Stadium: Stadio Artemio Franchi; Attendance: 30,546; Referee: Luca Pairetto

12 February 2023 22	Bologna	0–1	Monza	Bologna
15:00 CET (UTC+1)	Arnautović (yellow card) 86'	Report	Izzo (yellow card) 21'; Donati 25'; Marlon (yellow card) 51'; Pessina (yellow card) 80'; Birindelli (yellow card) 90+3'	Stadium: Stadio Renato Dall'Ara; Attendance: 21,692; Referee: Luca Zufferli

18 February 2023 23	Sampdoria	1–2	Bologna	Genoa
15:00 CET (UTC+1)	Amione (yellow card) 43'; Đuričić (yellow card) 45+2'; Rincón (yellow card) 59'; Sabiri 68' (pen.), (penalty missed) 71'	Report	Soriano 27'; Lucumí (yellow card) 61'; Orsolini 90'	Stadium: Stadio Luigi Ferraris; Attendance: 18,269; Referee: Massimiliano Irrati

26 February 2023 24	Bologna	1–0	Internazionale	Bologna
12:30 CET (UTC+1)	Orsolini 76'; Domínguez (yellow card) 85'	Report	De Vrij (yellow card) 45+1'; Dumfries (yellow card) 63'	Stadium: Stadio Renato Dall'Ara; Attendance: 28,317; Referee: Daniele Orsato

6 March 2023 25	Torino	1–0	Bologna	Turin
20:45 CET (UTC+1)	Karamoh 22'; Buongiorno (yellow card) 64'; Vojvoda (yellow card) 80'	Report	Barrow (yellow card) 70'; Schouten (yellow card) 77'	Stadium: Stadio Olimpico Grande Torino; Attendance: 18,592; Referee: Antonio Rapuano

11 March 2023 26	Bologna	0–0	Lazio	Bologna
20:45 CET (UTC+1)	Moro (yellow card) 24'; Ferguson (yellow card) 34'	Report	Hysaj (yellow card) 21'; Vecino (yellow card) 45+1'; Zaccagni (yellow card) 75'	Stadium: Stadio Renato Dall'Ara; Attendance: 27,369; Referee: Fabio Maresca

18 March 2023 27	Salernitana	2–2	Bologna	Salerno
18:00 CET (UTC+1)	Pirola 7'; Dia 64'	Report	Ferguson 11'; Lykogiannis 73'; Orsolini (yellow card) 76'	Stadium: Stadio Arechi; Attendance: 18,600; Referee: Luca Pairetto

2 April 2023 28	Bologna	3–0	Udinese	Bologna
12:30 CET (UTC+1)	Posch 3'; Moro 12'; Lucumí (yellow card) 45+1'; Barrow 49'	Report	Bijol (yellow card) 9'	Stadium: Stadio Renato Dall'Ara; Attendance: 25,562; Referee: Maria Sole Ferrieri Caputi

8 April 2023 29	Atalanta	0–2	Bologna	Bergamo
16:30 CEST (UTC+2)	Zappacosta (yellow card) 11'; Palomino (yellow card) 68'; Djimsiti (yellow card) 70'	Report	Sansone 49'; Lucumí (yellow card) 61'; Orsolini (yellow card) 81', (goal) 86'	Stadium: Gewiss Stadium; Attendance: 18,950; Referee: Daniele Orsato

15 April 2023 30	Bologna	1–1	Milan	Bologna
15:00 CEST (UTC+2)	Sansone 1'; Posch (yellow card) 58'; Domínguez (yellow card) 70'; Kyriakopoulos (yellow card) 90'	Report	Pobega 40', (yellow card) 81'; Florenzi (yellow card) 55'; Calabria (yellow card) 80'; Vranckx (yellow card) 87'	Stadium: Stadio Renato Dall'Ara; Attendance: 29,024; Referee: Davide Massa

21 April 2023 31	Hellas Verona	2–1	Bologna	Verona
20:45 CEST (UTC+2)	Verdi 45+6' (pen.), 62'; Faraoni (yellow card) 56'; Duda (yellow card) 72'; Montipò (yellow card) 90'	Report	Posch (yellow card) 25'; Barrow (yellow card) 31'; Domínguez (yellow card) 37', (goal) 90+4'; Skorupski (yellow card) 45+4'	Stadium: Stadio Marcantonio Bentegodi; Attendance: 21,031; Referee: Maurizio Mariani

30 April 2023 32	Bologna	1–1	Juventus	Bologna
20:45 CEST (UTC+2)	Posch (yellow card) 3'; Orsolini 10' (pen.); Kyriakopoulos (yellow card) 42'	Report	Milik (penalty missed) 31', 61'; Rabiot (yellow card) 55'; Paredes (yellow card) 88'	Stadium: Stadio Renato Dall'Ara; Attendance: 30,071; Referee: Simone Sozza

4 May 2023 33	Empoli	3–1	Bologna	Empoli
20:45 CEST (UTC+2)	Lucumí 1' (o.g.); Parisi (yellow card) 28'; Akpa Akpro 45+1'; Henderson (yellow card) 66'; Cambiaghi 68'; Bandinelli (yellow card) 87'	Report	Orsolini 88' (pen.)	Stadium: Stadio Carlo Castellani; Attendance: 8,439; Referee: Federico La Penna

8 May 2023 34	Sassuolo	1–1	Bologna	Reggio Emilia
20:45 CEST (UTC+2)	Berardi 15'; Lopez (yellow card) 44'	Report	Posch (yellow card) 27'; Domínguez 42'	Stadium: Mapei Stadium – Città del Tricolore; Attendance: 13,664; Referee: Maria Sole Ferrieri Caputi

14 May 2023 35	Bologna	0–0	Roma	Bologna
18:00 CEST (UTC+2)	Bonifazi (yellow card) 43'; Orsolini (yellow card) 80'	Report	Camara (yellow card) 90+1'	Stadium: Stadio Renato Dall'Ara; Attendance: 23,824; Referee: Daniele Orsato

20 May 2023 36	Cremonese	1–5	Bologna	Cremona
15:00 CEST (UTC+2)	Buonaiuto (yellow card) 86'; Ciofani 90+1'	Report	Arnautović 14'; Ferguson 27'; Orsolini (yellow card) 29' (yellow-red card) 73', (goal) 62'; Posch 45+1'; Sansone 80'	Stadium: Stadio Giovanni Zini; Attendance: 11,140; Referee: Paolo Valeri

28 May 2023 37	Bologna	2–2	Napoli	Bologna
15:00 CEST (UTC+2)	Ferguson 63'; Domínguez (yellow card) 67'; De Silvestri 84'	Report	Osimhen 14', 54'; Kim (yellow card) 39'; Rrahmani (yellow card) 66'; Bereszyński (yellow card) 80'	Stadium: Stadio Renato Dall'Ara; Attendance: 27,209; Referee: Matteo Marceenaro

4 June 2023 38	Lecce	2–3	Bologna	Lecce
21:00 CEST (UTC+2)	Banda 17'; Gallo (yellow card) 68'; Oudin 88'	Report	Posch (yellow card) 35'; Arnautović 58'; Zirkzee 81'; Aebischer (yellow card) 84'; Ferguson 90+7'	Stadium: Stadio Via del mare Attendance: 25,816; Referee: Marco Piccinini

=== Coppa Italia ===
8 August 2022 Round of 64	Bologna	1–0	Cosenza	Bologna
21:15 CEST (UTC+2)	Schouten (yellow card) 9'; Arnautović (yellow card) 61'; Sansone 65'	Report	Panico (yellow card) 36'; Venturi (yellow card) 87'	Stadium: Stadio Renato Dall'Ara; Attendance: 10,706; Referee: Giacomo Camplone

20 October 2022 Round of 32	Bologna	1–0	Cagliari	Bologna
21:00 CEST (UTC+2)	Bonifazi (yellow card) 18'; Obert 69' (o.g.)	Report	Millico (yellow card) 48'	Stadium: Stadio Renato Dall'Ara; Attendance: 6,400; Referee: Giacomo Camplone

19 January 2023 Round of 16	Lazio	1–0	Bologna	Rome
18:00 CET (UTC+1)	Felipe Anderson 33'; Zaccagni (yellow card) 61'; Luis Alberto (yellow card) 79'	Report	Sosa (yellow card) 57'; Zirkzee (yellow card) 88'	Stadium: Stadio Olimpico; Attendance: 30,000; Referee: Niccolo Baroni

== Appearances and goals ==
No.	Pos	Nat	Player	Total		Serie A		Coppa Italia	
No.	Pos	Nat	Player	Apps	Goals	Apps	Goals	Apps	Goals
Goalkeepers
1	GK	(Italy) ITA	Francesco Bardi	2	0	1	0	1	0
28	GK	(Poland) POL	Łukasz Skorupski	39	0	37	0	2	0
Defenders
3	DF	(Austria) AUT	Stefan Posch	31	6	30	6	1	0
4	DF	(Uruguay) URU	Joaquín Sosa	11	0	7+3	0	1	0
5	DF	(France) FRA	Adama Soumaoro	26	0	22+1	0	3	0
14	DF	(Italy) ITA	Kevin Bonifazi	15	0	9+4	0	2	0
22	DF	(Greece) GRE	Charalampos Lykogiannis	24	2	11+10	2	3	0
26	DF	(Colombia) COL	Jhon Lucumí	34	0	33	0	0+1	0
29	DF	(Italy) ITA	Lorenzo De Silvestri	17	1	6+9	1	1+1	0
50	DF	(Italy) ITA	Andrea Cambiaso	34	0	25+7	0	1+1	0
77	DF	(Greece) GRE	Giorgos Kyriakopoulos	12	0	8+4	0	0	0
Midfielders
6	MF	(Argentina) ARG	Nikola Moro	28	1	12+14	1	2	0
8	MF	(Argentina) ARG	Nicolás Domínguez	34	3	26+5	3	2+1	0
17	MF	(Chile) CHI	Gary Medel	31	7	17+12	7	1+1	0
19	MF	(Scotland) SCO	Lewis Ferguson	33	7	27+5	7	1	0
20	MF	(Switzerland) SUI	Michel Aebischer	34	1	18+14	1	1+1	0
21	MF	(Italy) ITA	Roberto Soriano	30	1	15+12	1	1+2	0
25	MF	(Finland) FIN	Niklas Pyyhtiä	7	0	0+6	0	0+1	0
30	MF	(Netherlands) NED	Jerdy Schouten	36	0	29+4	0	3	0
Forwards
7	FW	(Italy) ITA	Riccardo Orsolini	34	11	22+10	11	1+1	0
9	FW	(Austria) AUT	Marko Arnautović	23	10	18+3	10	1+1	0
10	FW	(Italy) ITA	Nicola Sansone	20	5	8+10	4	2	1
11	FW	(Netherlands) NED	Joshua Zirkzee	21	2	5+14	2	1+1	0
18	FW	(Italy) ITA	Antonio Raimondo	2	0	0+2	0	0	0
99	FW	(The Gambia) GAM	Musa Barrow	35	3	26+6	3	2+1	0
Players who left the club permanently or on loan during the season
33	DF	(Netherlands) NED	Denso Kasius	7	0	4+3	0	0	0
55	FW	(Italy) ITA	Emanuel Vignato	9	0	2+6	0	0+1	0
