= Dominik Yankov =

Bulgarian footballer (born 2000)

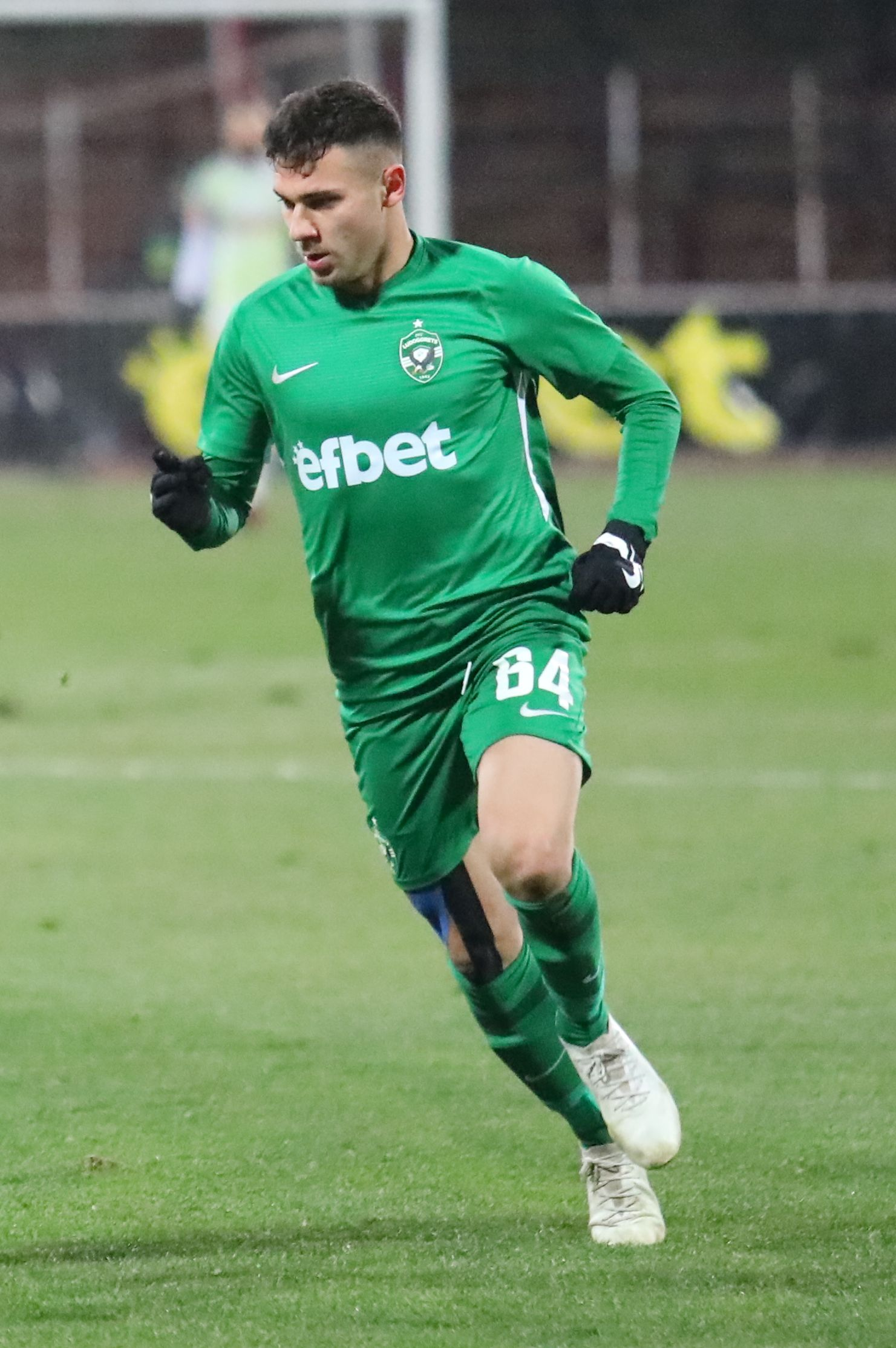
- Dominik Yankov in 2021

Personal information
- Full name: Dominik Ivilin Yankov
- Date of birth: 28 July 2000 (age 26)
- Place of birth: Toronto, Ontario, Canada
- Height: 1.76 m (5 ft 9 in)
- Position: Midfielder

Team information
- Current team: Arda Kardzhali
- Number: 8

Youth career
- 2008–2013: Power FC
- 2013–2016: Sunderland
- 2016–2017: Ludogorets Razgrad

Senior career*
Years	Team	Apps	(Gls)
2017–2024	Ludogorets II	47	(7)
2018–2024	Ludogorets Razgrad	83	(11)
2019–2020	→ Botev Vratsa (loan)	24	(3)
2024–2025	CF Montréal	24	(2)
2025–2026	Rijeka	1	(0)
2026	→ Lokomotiv Sofia (loan)	14	(2)
2026–	Arda Kardzhali	6	(2)

International career^{‡}
2017–2018	Bulgaria U19	5	(0)
2019–2022	Bulgaria U21	9	(2)
2020–	Bulgaria	18	(0)
- * Club domestic league appearances and goals as of 06:17, 4 September 2026 (UTC) ‡ National team caps and goals as of 18:35, 27 March 2026 (UTC)

Dominik Ivilin Yankov (Bulgarian: Доминик Ивилин Янков; born 28 July 2000) is a professional footballer who plays as a midfielder for Bulgarian First League club Arda Kardzhali. Born in Canada, he represents Bulgaria on international level.

Yankov played in the Power FC Soccer Academy in Toronto until age 13, when he joined Sunderland's Academy. Three years later he moved to Bulgaria, joining Ludogorets, where he made his senior debut.

== Career ==
=== Ludogorets Razgrad ===
==== Academy and second team ====
Before joining Ludogorets, Yankov spent 5 years playing for Power FC, a private Canadian academy. After that he moved to Sunderland where he spent 3 years, but after his parents decided to return to Bulgaria, they chose the Ludogorets academy as the best place for him to continue his career.

Yankov made his debut in the UEFA Youth League for Ludogorets on 27 September 2017 in the first round of Domestic champions path against Željezničar Sarajevo.

On 27 May 2017, in the last league match of the season, Yankov was set on bench in the match against Spartak Pleven, but remained on bench the whole match. He completed his debut for the doubles on 13 August 2017 in a league match against Nesebar.

==== First team ====
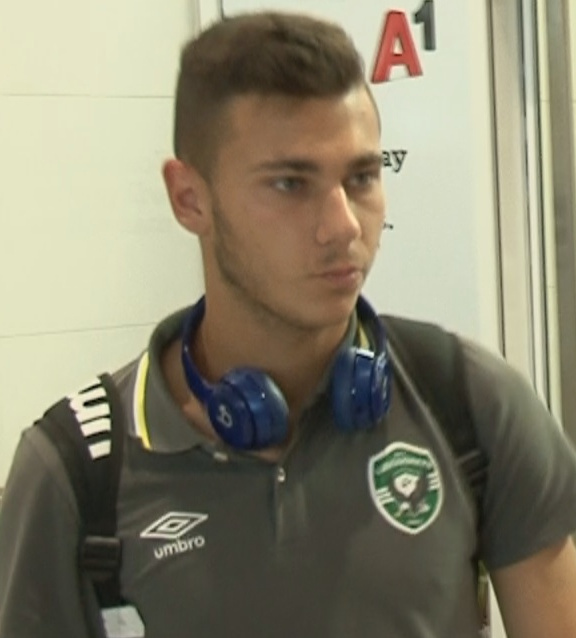
Yankov in 2018

In February 2018, Ludogorets manager Dimitar Dimitrov took Yankov in the first team. Yankov made an unofficial debut for the team in a winter break friendly against the Romanian club Botoșani. He completed his debut for the team on 12 May 2018 in a league match against Levski Sofia.

==== Loan to Botev Vratsa ====
On 1 August 2019, Yankov was sent on loan to the fellow First League team Botev Vratsa until end of the year with an option to extend the loan until the end of the season. He made his debut for the team three days later in a league match against CSKA Sofia, coming on as a substitute in the 84th minute. In his first match as a starter on 16 August against Slavia Sofia, Yankov scored his first goal for the team and also assisted another.

==== Return to Ludogorets ====
After his successful spell in Botev, Ludogorets coach Pavel Vrba decided to include Yankov in the first team. He returned in play in the Supercup match against Lokomotiv Plovdiv on 2 August. On 19 August, he completed his debut in the Champions League match against FK Budućnost Podgorica. On 25 August, before the Champions League match against FC Midtjylland, he tested positive for COVID-19. He returned in play on 12 September 2020, scoring his debut league goal and helping his team to a win over Lokomotiv Plovdiv. On 24 September 2020, he signed a new long-term contract with the team.

=== CF Montréal ===
On 29 January 2024, Yankov signed with MLS team CF Montréal for an undisclosed fee.

== International career ==
Yankov was born in Canada to Bulgarian parents, which makes him eligible for both Canada and Bulgaria national teams. He played for Canada U15, but later represented Bulgaria on U17, U19 and U21 levels although he received several invites for Canada's youth teams, including a call for the U23 for the 2020 CONCACAF Olympic qualifying. In October 2020 he was called for Bulgaria U21 team, but after an injury of Borislav Tsonev, Yankov received his first call up for the senior team of Bulgaria, declaring he will represent the nation on international level. He completed his debut on 8 October in the UEFA Euro 2020 Play-off match against Hungary, coming as a substitute in the 79th minute. In 202, he was called up for the U21 team of Bulgaria for the friendly tournament Antalya Cup, where he was named the team captain. Bulgarian team finished as a runner-up, losing the final game against North Macedonia U21. Yankov scored 2 goals and was named as the best midfielder.

== Career statistics ==
=== Club ===
As of 21 November 2024

Club performance			League		Cup		Continental		Other		Total	
Club	League	Season	Apps	Goals	Apps	Goals	Apps	Goals	Apps	Goals	Apps	Goals
Bulgaria			League		Bulgarian Cup		Europe		Other (Note: Includes Bulgarian Supercup matches.)		Total	
Ludogorets Razgrad II	Second League	2016–17	0	0	–		–		–		0	0
Ludogorets Razgrad II	Second League	2017–18	19	2	–		–		–		19	2
Ludogorets Razgrad II	Second League	2018–19	22	2	–		–		–		22	2
Ludogorets Razgrad II	Second League	2020–21	1	0	–		–		–		1	0
Ludogorets Razgrad II	Second League	2022–23	5	3	–		–		–		5	3
Ludogorets Razgrad II	Total		47	7	0	0	0	0	0	0	47	7
Ludogorets Razgrad	First League	2017–18	3	0	0	0	0	0	0	0	3	0
Ludogorets Razgrad	First League	2018–19	3	0	2	0	0	0	0	0	5	0
Ludogorets Razgrad	First League	2019–20	1	0	0	0	0	0	0	0	1	0
Ludogorets Razgrad	First League	2020–21	28	5	3	0	7	0	1	0	39	5
Ludogorets Razgrad	First League	2021–22	28	4	3	2	9	0	1	1	41	7
Ludogorets Razgrad	First League	2022–23	11	0	2	0	6	0	0	0	19	0
Ludogorets Razgrad	First League	2023–24	9	2	0	0	10	1	0	0	19	3
Ludogorets Razgrad	Total		83	11	10	2	32	1	2	1	127	15
Botev Vratsa (loan)	First League	2019–20	24	3	3	2	–		–		27	5
United States/Canada			League		Canadian Championship		CONCACAF		Other			
CF Montréal	Major League Soccer	2024	21	2	1	0	1	0	0	0	23	2
Career statistics			154	21	13	4	32	1	2	1	201	27

=== International ===
As of match played 27 March 2026

Appearances and goals by national team and year
National team	Year	Apps	Goals
Bulgaria	2020	3	0
Bulgaria	2021	9	0
Bulgaria	2022	3	0
Bulgaria	2023	2	0
Bulgaria	2026	1	0
Total		18	0

== Honours ==
=== Club ===
Ludogorets

- First Professional Football League (6): 2017–18, 2018–19, 2020-21, 2021–22, 2022–23, 2023-24
- Bulgarian Supercup (3): 2019, 2021, 2022
- Bulgarian Cup: 2022–23

=== Individual ===
- Best Progressing Player in the Bulgarian First League: 2020
