= Niklas Pyyhtiä =

Finnish footballer (born 2003)

Personal information
- Full name: Niklas Anton Juhana Pyyhtiä
- Date of birth: 25 September 2003 (age 23)
- Place of birth: Turku, Finland
- Height: 1.88 m (6 ft 2 in)
- Position: Central midfielder

Team information
- Current team: Südtirol (on loan from Bologna)
- Number: 8

Youth career
- –2020: TPS
- 2021–2024: Bologna

Senior career*
Years	Team	Apps	(Gls)
2019–2020	TPS	19	(1)
2021	Honka	17	(2)
2021–	Bologna	7	(0)
2023–2024	→ Ternana (loan)	31	(1)
2025	→ Südtirol (loan)	18	(4)
2025–2026	→ Modena (loan)	28	(0)
2026–	→ Südtirol (loan)	1	(0)

International career^{‡}
2018	Finland U16	4	(0)
2019–2020	Finland U17	11	(3)
2021	Finland U19	3	(0)
2021–2025	Finland U21	21	(1)
2025–	Finland	2	(1)
- * Club domestic league appearances and goals as of 22 August 2026 ‡ National team caps and goals as of 5 June 2026

Niklas Anton Juhana Pyyhtiä (born 25 September 2003) is a Finnish professional footballer who plays as a central midfielder for Serie B club Südtirol, on loan from Bologna, and the Finland national football team.

== Club career ==
=== TPS ===
Pyyhtiä played in the youth sector of Turun Palloseura (TPS). He made his senior debut with TPS first team in 2019, playing in the second-tier Ykkönen. After TPS won the promotion for the next season, Pyyhtiä debuted in Veikkausliiga in 2020, making 18 appearances and scoring one goal.

=== Honka ===
After TPS got relegated back to Ykkönen, Pyyhtiä was loaned out to Veikkausliiga club Honka with a purchase option, ahead of the 2021 Veikkausliiga season. Soon after the season started, Honka exercised their option to permanently sign with Pyyhtiä. The total fee was not disclosed, but TPS got a compensation of the loan and of the permanent transfer separately, and has a sell-on clause.

=== Bologna ===
On 30 August 2021, Pyyhtiä signed with Serie A club Bologna for an undisclosed fee. However, the fee was reported to be around €500,000 and could potentially rise to €1 million with add-ons. Honka also has a sell-on clause. Pyyhtiä was first registered to their U19 Primavera squad.

He made his Serie A debut for Bologna on 17 January 2022 in a match against Napoli. In the 2022–23 season, he made six appearances in Serie A and additionally one appearance in Coppa Italia.

==== Ternana (loan) ====
On 17 August 2023, Pyyhtiä extended his contract with Bologna until 30 June 2026, and joined Serie B club Ternana on loan for the 2023–24 season. He made his debut with the club on 19 August 2023, in a 2–1 home defeat against Sampdoria, as a 46th-minute substitute to Filippo Damian. In the process, he assisted his side's only goal. On 27 February 2024, Pyyhtiä scored his first goal in Serie B for Ternana, in a 3–2 win against Palermo. He returned to Bologna in the summer 2024 after his loan deal expired.

==== Südtirol (loan) ====
After having missed the rest of 2024 due to injury, on 7 January 2025, he was loaned out to Serie B club Südtirol for the remainder of the season. Five days later, he scored in his Südtirol debut, in a 1–1 draw against Catanzaro in Serie B. He scored again in the next round, in away match against Sassuolo on 19 January. Subsequently, he was named the most valuable under-23 player in the Serie B for January 2025.

==== Modena (loan) ====
On 16 July 2025, Pyyhtiä signed a season-long loan deal with Serie B club Modena.

==== Südtirol (loan) ====
On 16 July 2026, Pyyhtiä returned to a Südtirol on a season-long loan deal.

== International career ==
Pyyhtiä is a regular Finnish youth international. He has represented Finland in European qualifiers at under-17, under-19 and under-21 levels. Pyyhtiä was named in the Finland U21 squad for the 2025 UEFA European Under-21 Championship final tournament in June 2025, where he played in Finland's all three group stage matches and assisted a goal in a 2–2 draw against Denmark.

== Personal life ==
His two older brothers are ice hockey players. Mikael is a professional player for Columbus Blue Jackets in the NHL, and Tuomas plays at an amateur level in Finland. Their father Tomi is a former footballer.

== Career statistics ==
=== Club ===
As of 13 May 2025

Appearances and goals by club, season and competition
Club	Season	League			Cup (Note: Includes Suomen Cup and Coppa Italia)		Continental		Other		Total	
Club	Season	Division	Apps	Goals	Apps	Goals	Apps	Goals	Apps	Goals	Apps	Goals
TPS	2019	Ykkönen	1	0	0	0	—		—		1	0
TPS	2020	Veikkausliiga	18	1	1	0	—		—		19	1
TPS	Total		19	1	1	0	0	0	0	0	20	1
TPS U23	2019	Nelonen	3	0	—		—		—		3	0
TPS U23	2020	Kolmonen	4	1	—		—		—		4	1
TPS U23	Total		7	1	0	0	0	0	0	0	7	1
Honka	2021	Veikkausliiga	17	2	5	2	4 (Note: Appearances in UEFA Europa Conference League)	0	—		26	4
Bologna	2021–22	Serie A	1	0	0	0	—		—		1	0
Bologna	2022–23	Serie A	6	0	1	0	—		—		7	0
Bologna	2023–24	Serie A	0	0	1	0	—		—		1	0
Bologna	Total		7	0	2	0	—		0	0	9	0
Ternana (loan)	2023–24	Serie B	31	1	0	0	—		—		31	1
Südtirol (loan)	2024–25	Serie B	18	4	0	0	—		—		18	4
Modena (loan)	2025–26	Serie B	0	0	0	0	—		—		0	0
Career total			97	9	8	2	4	0	0	0	109	11

=== International ===
As of match played 5 June 2026

National team	Year	Apps	Goals
Finland	2025	1	1
Finland	2026	1	0
Total		2	1

Scores and results list Finland's goal tally first, score column indicates score after each Pyyhtiä goal.

List of international goals scored by Niklas Pyyhtiä
No.	Date	Venue	Opponent	Score	Result	Competition
1	17 November 2025	Tammelan Stadion, Tampere, Finland	Andorra	3–0	4–0	Friendly

== Honours ==
TPS

- Ykkönen runner-up: 2019

Individual

- Serie B U-23 Player of the Month: January 2025
