= Jules-Anthony Vilsaint =

Canadian soccer player (born 2003)

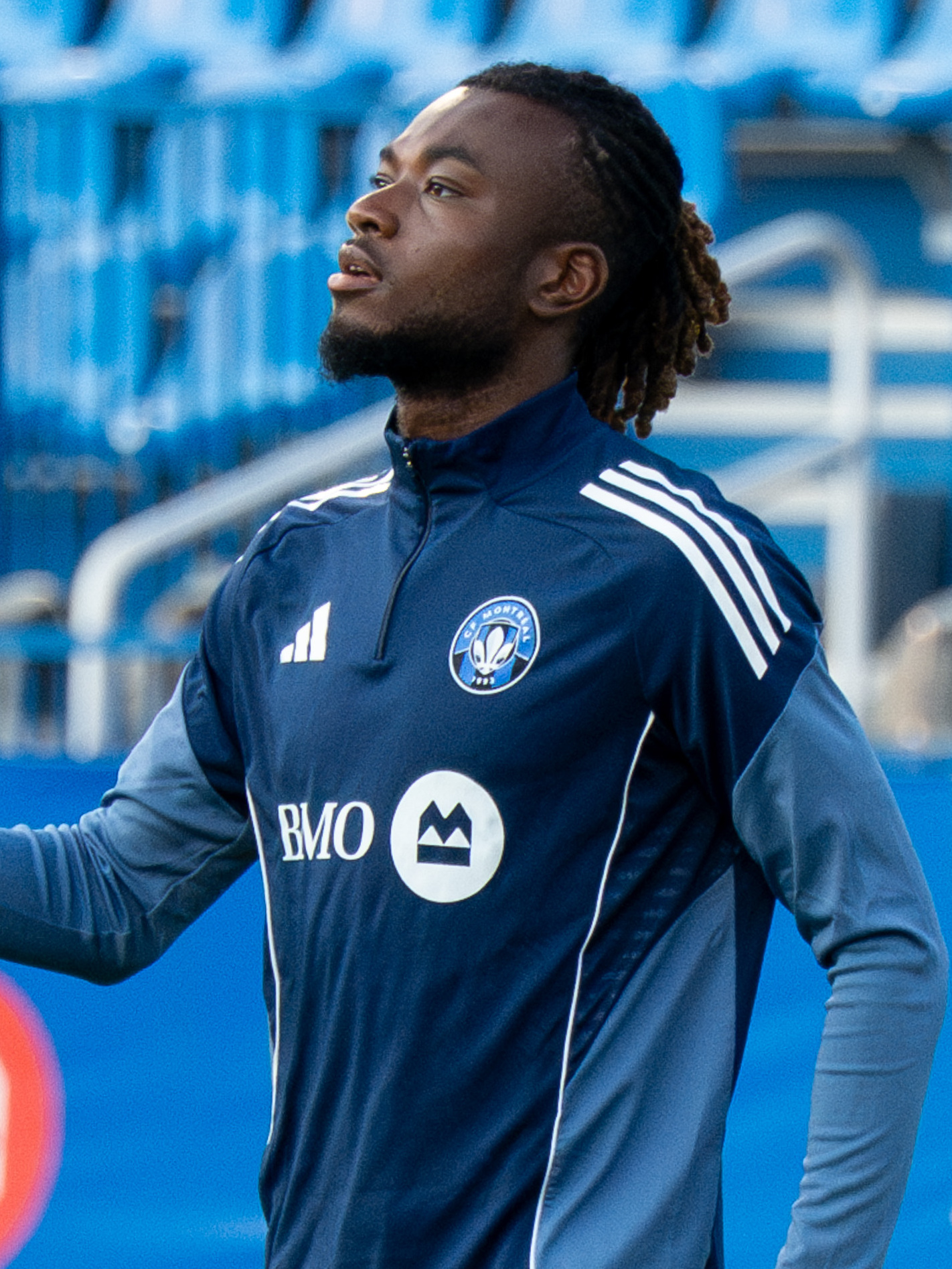
- Vilsaint with CF Montréal in 2025

Personal information
- Date of birth: January 6, 2003 (age 23)
- Place of birth: Montreal, Quebec, Canada
- Height: 1.94 m (6 ft 4 1/2 in)
- Positions: Forward; attacking midfielder

Team information
- Current team: Toronto FC
- Number: 99

Youth career
- CS Delta Laval
- –2015: CS St-Laurent
- 2016–2019: CS Panellinios
- 2020–2021: Lille
- 2021–2022: Antwerp

Senior career*
Years	Team	Apps	(Gls)
2022–2023	Antwerp II	10	(1)
2023–2025	CF Montréal	39	(3)
2023	CF Montréal U23	2	(1)
2025–	Toronto FC	11	(1)
- * Club domestic league appearances and goals as of July 22, 2026

Jules-Anthony Vilsaint (born January 6, 2003) is a Canadian soccer player who plays as a forward or attacking midfielder for Major League Soccer club Toronto FC.

== Early life ==
Vilsaint began playing youth soccer at age four with CS Delta Laval. He later played with CS St-Laurent and CS Panellinios. In 2020, he moved to Europe and trained with the reserve team of French club Lille. In March 2021, he moved to Belgian club Antwerp, signing a 4 year contract.

== Club career ==
In 2022, Vilsaint began playing with Royal Antwerp II in the third tier Belgian National Division 1, scoring one goal in ten appearances. It was reported that complications off-the-field, rather than injury, limited aspects of his game time.

In February 2023, Vilsaint joined CF Montréal of Major League Soccer on a two-year contract with option years for 2025 and 2026. The deal included a sell-on clause for Antwerp. He made his MLS debut for his new club on May 31, against DC United. Vilsaint scored his first goal for CF Montréal on September 2 against the Columbus Crew, netting the second goal in an eventual 4-2 defeat.

In August 2025, he was traded to Toronto FC along with up to $275,000 of General Allocation Money, in exchange for Matty Longstaff.

== International career ==
Vilsaint is eligible to play for both Canada and Haiti.

In 2019, Vilsaint was named to a preliminary squad of eligible players for the Haiti U17 side for the 2019 FIFA U-17 World Cup, but was not named to the squad for the tournament.

Vilsaint was named in the a Canadian provisional squad for the 2021 Gold Cup. In April 2022, he was invited to a Canada U20 camp, but did not participate. In May 2022, he was named in Canada's provisional squad for the 2022 CONCACAF U-20 Championship.

== Style of play ==
First playing as a midfielder, Vilsaint started playing mainly as a centre-forward for Lille, while still also regularly as a winger for Antwerp. He is described as a player with great physical abilities, having a good pace despite his tall stature, able to play in many different attacking positions.

== Personal life ==
Vilsaint has a younger brother, Jaylen-Andre Vilsaint, who is also a soccer player currently playing in Portugal for Torreense U19 team and has represented Haiti in the Under-20 team.

== Career statistics ==
As of match played July 22, 2026

Appearances and goals by club, season and competition
Club	Season	League			Playoffs		National cup		Other		Total	
Club	Season	Division	Apps	Goals	Apps	Goals	Apps	Goals	Apps	Goals	Apps	Goals
Antwerp II	2022–23	Belgian National Division 1	10	1	—		—		—		10	1
CF Montréal	2023	MLS	11	1	—		1	0	1	0	13	1
CF Montréal	2024	MLS	19	2	1	0	1	0	0	0	21	2
CF Montréal	2024	MLS	9	0	—		2	0	0	0	11	0
CF Montréal	Total		39	3	1	0	4	0	1	0	45	3
CF Montréal U23	2023	Ligue1 Québec	2	1	—		—		0	0	2	1
Toronto FC	2025	MLS	7	1	—		—		—		7	1
Toronto FC	2026	MLS	4	0	—		0	0	—		4	0
Toronto FC	Total		11	1	—		0	0	—		11	1
Career total			62	6	1	0	4	0	1	0	68	6
