= Nathan Saliba =

Canadian soccer player (born 2004)

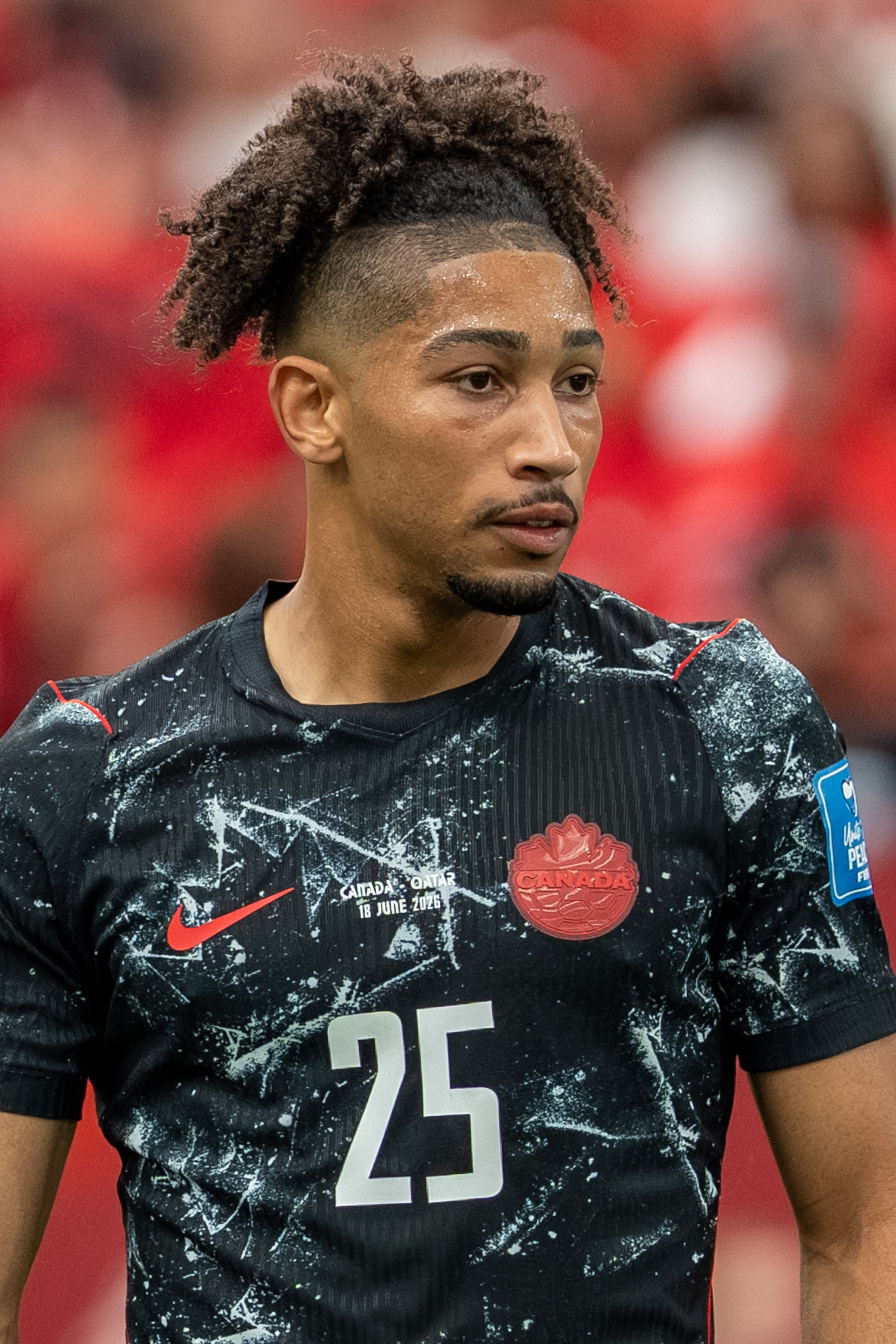
- Saliba with Canada in 2026

Personal information
- Full name: Nathan-Dylan Saliba
- Date of birth: February 7, 2004 (age 22)
- Place of birth: Longueuil, Quebec, Canada
- Height: 1.74 m (5 ft 9 in)
- Position: Central midfielder

Team information
- Current team: Villarreal
- Number: 24

Youth career
- 2013–2017: CS Longueuil
- 2017–2020: Montreal Impact

Senior career*
| Years | Team | Apps | (Gls) |
| 2020–2025 | CF Montréal (Note: Montreal Impact changed its name to CF Montréal in 2021) | 68 | (2) |
| 2022 | → CF Montréal U23 (loan) | 7 | (4) |
| 2025–2026 | Anderlecht | 36 | (3) |
| 2026– | Villarreal | 7 | (0) |

International career^{‡}
| 2019 | Canada U15 | 4 | (0) |
| 2024– | Canada | 23 | (3) |
- * Club domestic league appearances and goals as of November 8, 2026 ‡ National team caps and goals as of November 16, 2026

Nathan-Dylan Saliba (born February 7, 2004) is a Canadian professional soccer player who plays as a central midfielder for La Liga club Villarreal and the Canada national team.

== Early life ==
Born in Longueuil, Quebec, Canada, Saliba is of Haitian descent from his mother's side and of Lebanese descent from his father's side. Both his parents were born in Haiti. He can speak English, French and Haitian Creole.

Saliba began playing youth soccer at age nine with CS Longueuil. In 2017, he joined the Montreal Impact Academy.

== Club career ==
=== CF Montréal ===
In December 2020, he signed his first professional contract with the Montreal Impact (later re-named CF Montreal) of Major League Soccer. He served as an unused substitute in their CONCACAF Champions League match against C.D. Olimpia on December 15, 2020.

In 2022, he played with CF Montréal U23 in the Première ligue de soccer du Québec, scoring four goals in seven appearances. In December 2022, he signed a two-year extension with Montreal.

During the 2023 pre-season, he sought to earn a spot with the first team squad, rather than to pursue a loan to the Canadian Premier League, as other Montreal young players had gone on in previous seasons and he scored a goal against the PLSQ All-Stars in a pre-season exhibition match. He made his professional debut on February 25, 2023, starting the season opener against Inter Miami CF.

At the end of the 2024 season, he was named to the MLS 22 Under 22 list and was nominated for the MLS Young Player of the Year award.

=== Anderlecht ===
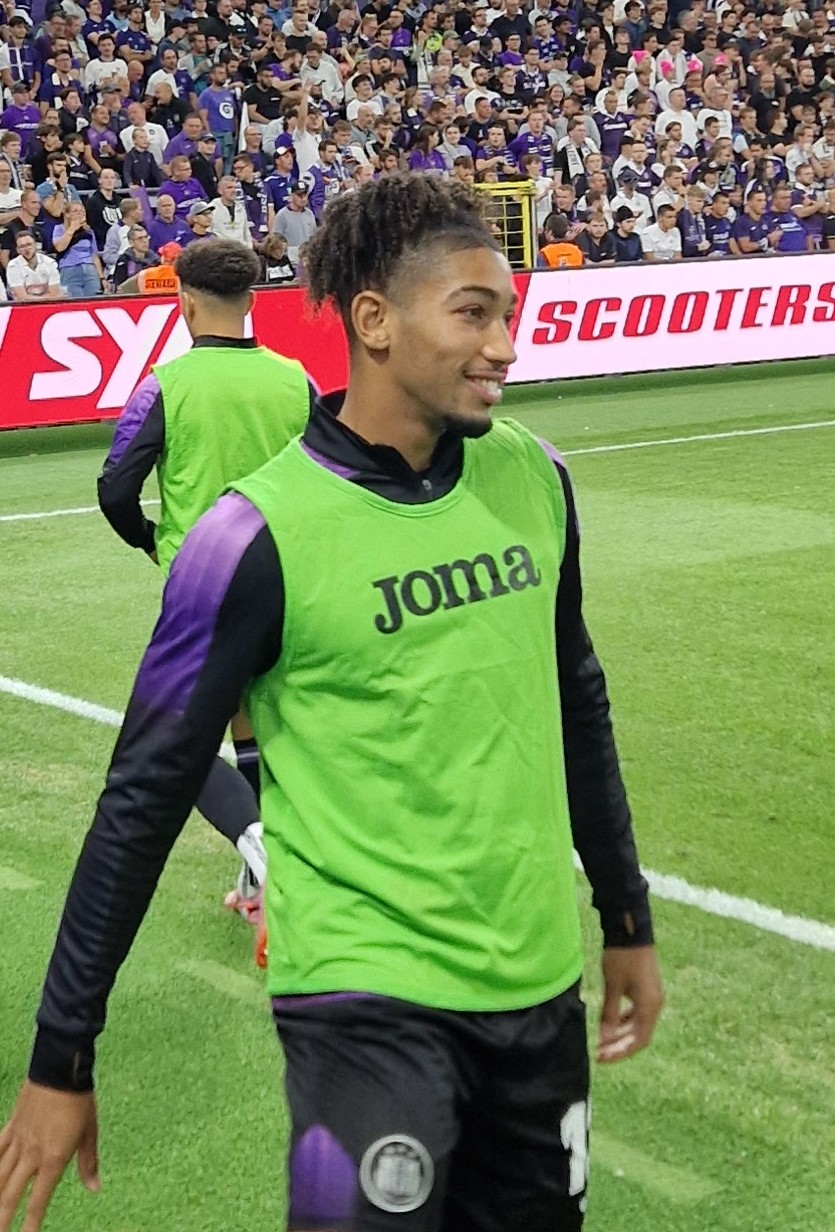
Saliba with Anderlecht in 2025

In June 2025, Saliba joined Belgian Pro League club Anderlecht on a transfer for an undisclosed fee, signing a contract until 2029, with CF Montréal retaining a sell-on clause. He made his debut for his new club on July 24 in a Europa League qualifier against BK Häcken. Saliba scored his first goal on July 27 in Anderlecht's season opener against Westerlo, netting the fourth goal in a 5-2 victory.

=== Villarreal ===
On 25 August 2026, Saliba joined Villarreal from Anderlecht for an undisclosed fee, signing a contract for five seasons until 2031. Saliba's arrival marked the first time ever that a club in one of Europe's top five leagues had three Canadian players in its first-team squad, alongside Tajon Buchanan and Tani Oluwaseyi.

== International career ==
=== Youth ===
In 2016, he represented Canada at the Danone Nations Cup. In 2019, he made his debut in the Canadian youth program at a camp with the Canada U15 team, after which he was named to the roster for the 2019 CONCACAF Boys' Under-15 Championship.

In 2022, he was named to the provisional roster for the Canada U20 team ahead of the 2022 CONCACAF U-20 Championship, although he was not named to the final roster.

=== Senior ===
In February 2024, Saliba was named to the Canadian senior provisional roster for the 2024 Copa América qualifying play-offs against Trinidad and Tobago.

In August 2024 he received a call up to Canada for friendlies against the United States and Mexico, as an injury replacement for Samuel Adekugbe. Saliba made his debut in the first friendly against the USA on September 7, as a late substitute in a 2-1 victory. He was named the 2024 Canada Soccer Young Player of the Year.

In June 2025 Saliba was named to the squad for the 2025 CONCACAF Gold Cup. On June 17 in Canada's opening game against Honduras, he would score his first international goal in a 6-0 victory at BC Place.

In May 2026, Saliba was selected for Canada's squad for the 2026 FIFA World Cup, which the country co-hosted with Mexico and the United States. In Canada's second group match in Vancouver on June 18, he came off the bench for the injured Ismaël Koné and later scored his team's fourth goal from a free-kick in a 6–0 victory over Qatar, Canada's first ever World Cup win; after scoring, he ran to the touchline and lifted Koné’s empty number 8 jersey to the crowd in tribute to his teammate. He later also recorded an assist on Jonathan David's final goal of the match. In Canada's final group match on June 24, he assisted Promise David's goal in a 2–1 defeat against Switzerland, which saw them finish as runners-up in Group B; consequently, Canada advanced to the knock-out stages of the World Cup for the first time in its history.

== Career statistics ==
=== Club ===
As of match played November 8, 2026

Appearances and goals by club, season and competition
| Club | Season | League | | | Playoffs | | National cup (Note: Includes Canadian Championship, Belgian Cup) | | Continental | | Other | | Total | |
| Club | Season | Division | Apps | Goals | Apps | Goals | Apps | Goals | Apps | Goals | Apps | Goals | Apps | Goals |
|---|---|---|---|---|---|---|---|---|---|---|---|---|---|---|
| CF Montréal U23 (loan) | 2022 | PLSQ | 7 | 4 | — | | — | | — | | — | | 7 | 4 |
| CF Montréal | 2023 | Major League Soccer | 28 | 0 | — | | 3 | 0 | — | | 2 (Note: Appearances in Leagues Cup) | 0 | 33 | 0 |
| CF Montréal | 2024 | Major League Soccer | 24 | 1 | 1 | 0 | 0 | 0 | — | | 2 | 0 | 27 | 1 |
| CF Montréal | 2025 | Major League Soccer | 16 | 1 | 0 | 0 | 2 | 0 | — | | 0 | 0 | 18 | 1 |
| CF Montréal | Total | | 68 | 2 | 1 | 0 | 5 | 0 | — | | 4 | 0 | 78 | 2 |
| Anderlecht | 2025–26 | Belgian Pro League | 34 | 3 | — | | 6 | 1 | 5 (Note: Two appearances in UEFA Europa League, three appearances and one goal in UEFA Conference League) | 1 | — | | 45 | 5 |
| Anderlecht | 2026–27 | Belgian Pro League | 2 | 0 | — | | — | | 3 (Note: Appearances in UEFA Europa League) | 0 | — | | 5 | 0 |
| Anderlecht | Total | | 36 | 3 | — | | 6 | 1 | 8 | 1 | — | | 50 | 5 |
| Villarreal | 2026–27 | La Liga | 7 | 0 | — | | 0 | 0 | 3 (Note: Appearances in UEFA Champions League) | 0 | — | | 10 | 0 |
| Career total | | | 118 | 9 | 1 | 0 | 11 | 1 | 11 | 1 | 4 | 0 | 145 | 11 |

=== International ===
As of match played November 16, 2026

Appearances and goals by national team and year
| National team | Year | Apps | Goals |
|---|---|---|---|
| Canada | 2024 | 2 | 0 |
| Canada | 2025 | 9 | 2 |
| Canada | 2026 | 12 | 1 |
| Total | | 23 | 3 |

Scores and results list Canada's goal tally first, score column indicates score after each Saliba goal.

List of international goals scored by Nathan Saliba
| No. | Date | Venue | Opponent | Score | Result | Competition |
|---|---|---|---|---|---|---|
| 1 | June 17, 2025 | BC Place, Vancouver, Canada | Honduras | 6–0 | 6–0 | 2025 CONCACAF Gold Cup |
| 2 | June 21, 2025 | Shell Energy Stadium, Houston, United States | Curaçao | 1–0 | 1–1 | 2025 CONCACAF Gold Cup |
| 3 | June 18, 2026 | BC Place, Vancouver, Canada | Qatar | 4–0 | 6–0 | 2026 FIFA World Cup |

== Honours ==
Individual

- Canada Soccer Youth Player of the Year: 2024
