= Fernando Álvarez (footballer, born 2003) =

Colombian footballer (born 2003)

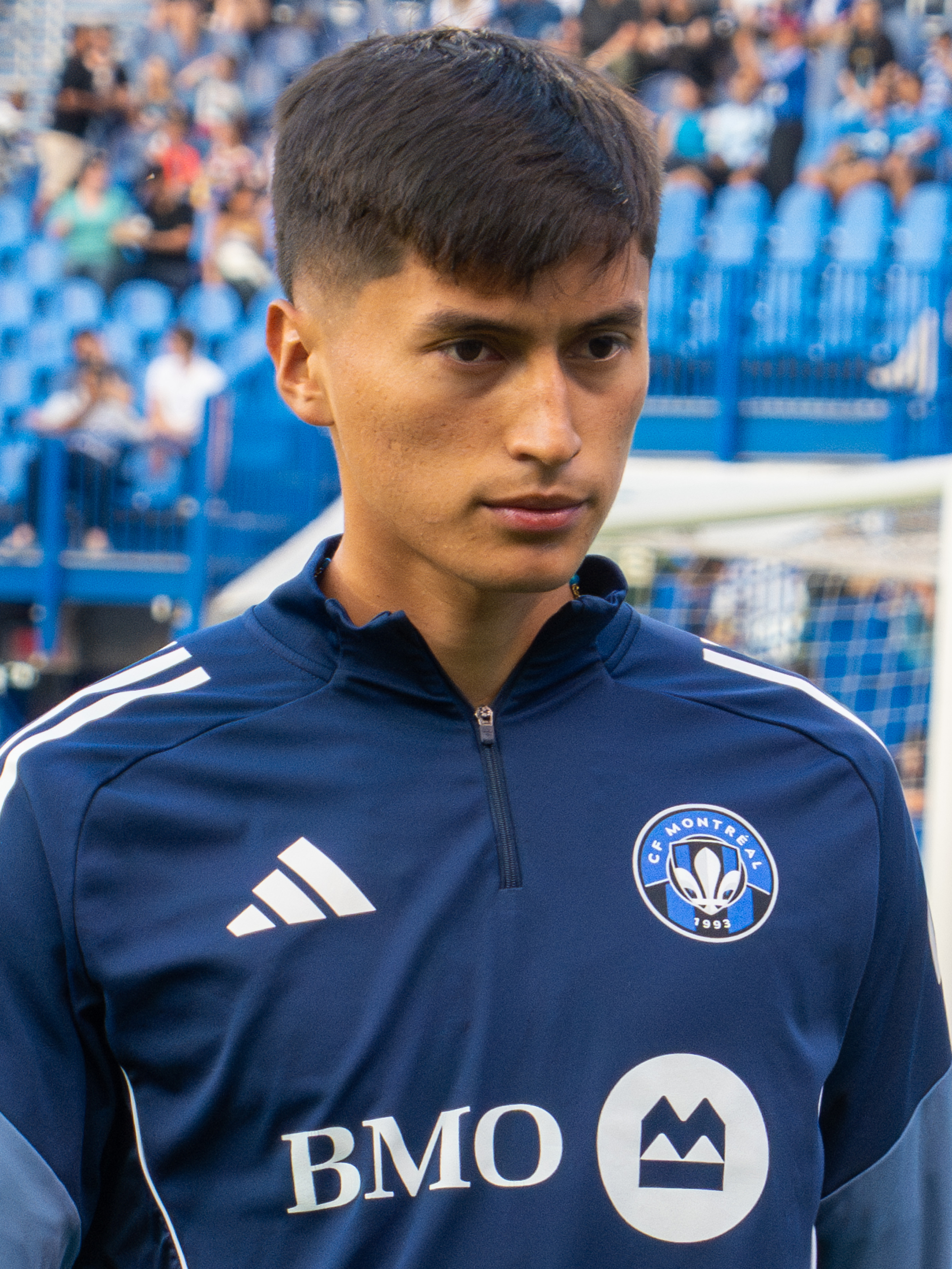
- Álvarez with CF Montréal in 2025

Personal information
- Full name: Fernando Antonio Álvarez Amador
- Date of birth: 24 August 2003 (age 23)
- Place of birth: New York City, New York, US
- Height: 1.87 m (6 ft 2 in)
- Position: Defender

Team information
- Current team: Deportivo Cali
- Number: 4

Youth career
- 2016–2022: Pachuca

Senior career*
Years	Team	Apps	(Gls)
2022–2023	Pachuca	0	(0)
2022–2023	→ Pachuca Premier (loan)	8	(0)
2023–2025	CF Montréal	53	(1)
2023	→ CF Montréal U23 (loan)	1	(0)
2026–	Deportivo Cali	0	(0)

International career^{‡}
	Mexico U16	3	(0)
2020	Mexico U18	2	(0)
2022–	Colombia U20	15	(0)
- * Club domestic league appearances and goals as of 01:30, 6 January 2026 (UTC) ‡ National team caps and goals as of 16:53, 5 January 2023 (UTC)

Fernando Antonio Álvarez Amador (born 24 August 2003) is a professional footballer who plays as a defender for Liga DIMAYOR club Deportivo Cali. Born in the United States, he is a youth international for both Mexico and Colombia.

== Club career ==
Born in New York City, United States to a Mexican father and Colombian mother, Álvarez began his career with Liga MX club Pachuca. In October 2022, he went on trial with Dutch side Ajax alongside teammate Julio Pérez.

On 28 July 2023, Álvarez signed with Major League Soccer club CF Montréal through the 2025 season with a team option for 2026 and 2027. On 10 March 2024, Álvarez scored his first professional goal in a 3–2 win at Inter Miami. On 20 October 2025, the team announced that they had declined Álvarez's contract option.

== International career ==
Eligible to represent the United States, Mexico and Colombia, Álvarez has represented Mexico and Colombia at youth international level. He was called up to the Colombia under-20 side for the 2023 South American U-20 Championship.

== Career statistics ==
As of 19 October 2025

Club	Season	League			Playoffs		National cup		Other		Total	
Club	Season	Division	Apps	Goals	Apps	Goals	Apps	Goals	Apps	Goals	Apps	Goals
Pachuca	2022–23	Liga MX	0	0	—		—		—		0	0
Pachuca Premier (loan)	2022–23	Serie A de México	8	0	—		—		1 (Note: Appearances in the Liguilla de Filiales)	0	9	0
CF Montréal	2023	Major League Soccer	4	0	—		0	0	0	0	4	0
CF Montréal	2024	Major League Soccer	27	1	1	0	2	0	3 (Note: Appearances in Leagues Cup)	0	33	1
CF Montréal	2025	Major League Soccer	22	0	—		1	0	2 (Note: Appearances in Leagues Cup)	0	25	0
CF Montréal	Total		53	1	1	0	3	0	5	0	62	1
CF Montréal U23 (loan)	2023	Ligue1 Québec	1	0	—		—		0	0	1	0
Career total			62	1	1	0	3	0	6	0	72	1
