= Joaquín Sosa =

Uruguayan footballer (born 2002)

Personal information
- Full name: Enzo Joaquín Sosa Romañuk
- Date of birth: 10 January 2002 (age 24)
- Place of birth: Fray Bentos, Uruguay
- Height: 1.89 m (6 ft 2 in)
- Position: Defender

Team information
- Current team: Colo-Colo (on loan from Bologna)
- Number: 4

Youth career
- 2016–2017: Anglo de Fray Bentos
- 2017–2020: Nacional

Senior career*
Years	Team	Apps	(Gls)
2021–2022	Nacional	0	(0)
2021	→ Rentistas (loan)	25	(2)
2022	→ Liverpool Montevideo (loan)	17	(0)
2022–	Bologna	10	(0)
2023	→ Dinamo Zagreb (loan)	1	(0)
2024	→ CF Montréal (loan)	19	(0)
2025	→ Reggiana (loan)	8	(0)
2025	→ Santa Fe (loan)	9	(0)
2026–	→ Colo-Colo (loan)	7	(0)

International career
2017	Uruguay U15	21	(4)
2018–2019	Uruguay U17	24	(0)
- * Club domestic league appearances and goals as of 17 March 2026

Enzo Joaquín Sosa Romañuk (born 10 January 2002) is a Uruguayan professional footballer who plays as a defender for Liga de Primera club Colo-Colo, on loan from Serie A club Bologna.

== Club career ==
Sosa is a youth academy graduate of Nacional. He made his professional debut for the club on 7 April 2021 in the second leg of 2020 Championship playoff final against Rentistas. Four days later, on 11 April, he joined Rentistas on a season long loan deal. He joined Liverpool Montevideo on a season long loan deal in February 2022.

On 17 August 2022, Sosa signed with Bologna in Italy. On 4 September 2023, he joined Dinamo Zagreb on a season long deal with a buy-out option.

On 10 January 2025, Sosa moved on a new loan to Reggiana in Serie B.

On 31 December 2025, Sosa moved on loan to Chilean club Colo-Colo for a year with a purchase option. In June 2026, the loan was extended until June 2027.

== International career ==
Sosa was born in Uruguay and is of Italian descent, holding dual citizenship. He is a former Uruguayan youth international. He was included in the national team for the 2017 South American U-15 Championship and 2019 South American U-17 Championship.

== Career statistics ==
As of 17 March 2026

Appearances and goals by club, season and competition
Club	Season	League			Cup		Continental		Other		Total	
Club	Season	Division	Apps	Goals	Apps	Goals	Apps	Goals	Apps	Goals	Apps	Goals
Nacional	2020	Uruguayan Primera División	0	0	—		0	0	1 (Note: Appearance in Championship playoffs.)	0	1	0
Rentistas (loan)	2021	Uruguayan Primera División	25	2	—		5 (Note: Appearances in Copa Libertadores.)	0	—		30	2
Liverpool Montevideo (loan)	2022	Uruguayan Primera División	17	0	0	0	2 (Note: Appearances in Copa Sudamericana.)	0	1 (Note: Appearance in Torneo Intermedio final.)	0	20	0
Bologna	2022–23	Serie A	10	0	1	0	—		—		11	0
Dinamo Zagreb (loan)	2023–24	Croatian Football League	1	0	2	0	0	0	—		3	0
CF Montréal (loan)	2024	Major League Soccer	19	0	—		—		4 (Note: Three appearances in Leagues Cup, one appearance in Canadian Championship)	0	23	0
Reggiana	2024–25	Serie B	8	0	—		—		—		8	0
Santa Fe (loan)	2025	Liga DIMAYOR	9	0	3	0	—		—		12	0
Colo-Colo (loan)	2026	Liga de Primera	7	0	2	0	—		—		9	0
Career total			95	2	8	0	7	0	6	0	117	2

== Honours ==
Nacional

- Uruguayan Primera División: 2020
