= Matías Cóccaro =

Uruguayan footballer (born 1997)

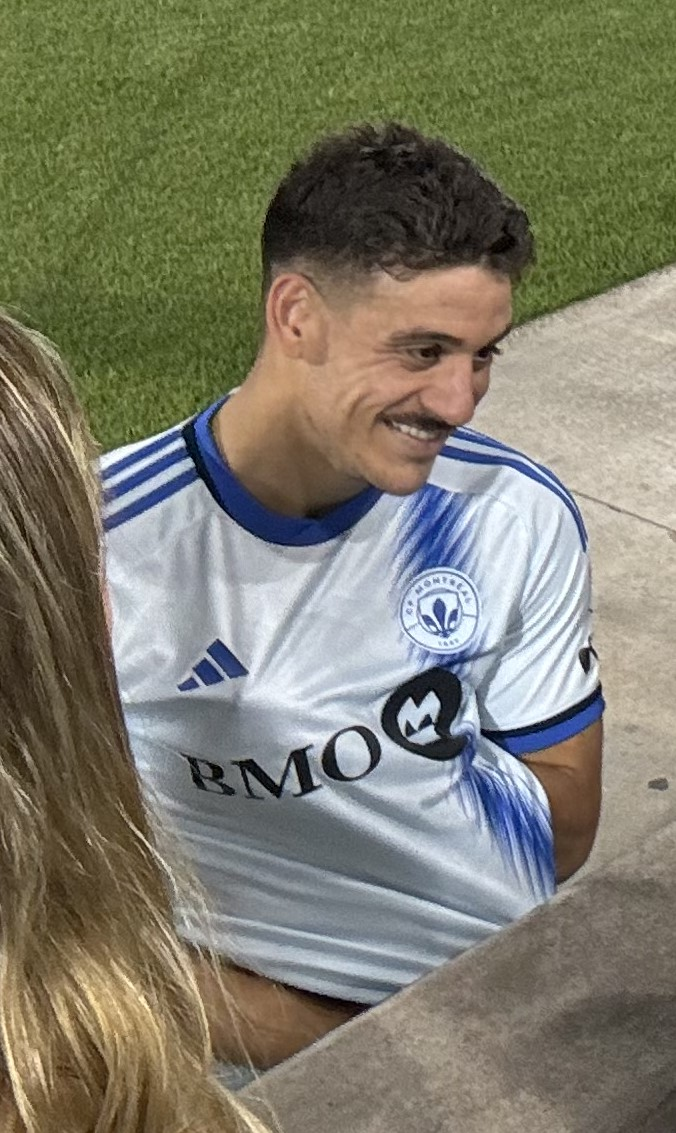
- Cóccaro with CF Montréal in 2024

Personal information
- Full name: Matías Fernando Cóccaro Ferreira
- Date of birth: 15 November 1997 (age 28)
- Place of birth: Pirarajá, Uruguay
- Height: 1.78 m (5 ft 10 in)
- Position: Forward

Team information
- Current team: Newell's Old Boys
- Number: 13

Youth career
- Lavalleja
- Cagliari
- Atlético Tucumán

Senior career*
Years	Team	Apps	(Gls)
2018	Rampla Juniors	19	(4)
2019	Villa Teresa	8	(5)
2019–2023	Montevideo City Torque	51	(13)
2021–2023	→ Huracán (loan)	95	(29)
2024–2026	CF Montréal	22	(4)
2025	→ Atlas (loan)	26	(2)
2026–	Newells Old Boys	15	(5)
- * Club domestic league appearances and goals as of 17:24, 8 May 2026 (UTC)

Matías Fernando Cóccaro Ferreira (born 15 November 1997) is a Uruguayan professional footballer who plays as a striker for Newell's Old Boys.

== Career ==
In 2017, Cóccaro joined the youth academy of Italian Serie A side Cagliari.

As a youth player, he joined the youth academy of Atlético Tucumán in Argentina after almost signing for Belgian side Royal Excel Mouscron and trialing in Italy.

Before the 2019 season, he signed for Uruguayan second division club Villa Teresa from Rampla Juniors in the Uruguayan top flight.

In January 2024, he was permanently transferred to MLS team CF Montréal. He scored his first MLS goal on 10 March 2024, aiding a 3–2 win against Miami FC. On 19 April 2024, he was injured and expected to miss 8–10 weeks. He returned as a reserve on 14 June.

On 4 January 2025, Cóccaro joined Liga MX club Atlas on a one-year loan. Cóccaro scored his first goal for Atlas on 5 April in a 1–1 draw with Juárez. On 13 September, Cóccaro scored his second goal for Atlas in a league match against Santos Laguna, but he would be sent off later in the match with a red card. Atlas would draw the game 2–2. On 22 December, Cóccaro reached an agreement with CF Montréal to terminate his contract.

On 12 January 2026, Newell's Old Boys announced the signing of Cóccaro through the end of the 2028 season.

== Personal life ==
Cóccaro was born in Uruguay and is of Italian descent, and holds dual citizenship.
