= List of Major League Soccer transfers 2025 =

Major League Soccer transfers in 2025

The following is a list of transfers for the 2025 Major League Soccer (MLS) season that were made during the 2024–25 MLS offseason all the way through to the roster freeze.

== Transfers ==
List of 2025 MLS transfers
| Date | Name | Moving from | Moving to | Mode of Transfer |
|---|---|---|---|---|
| November 20, 2024 | (United States) Jordan Farr | (United States) Tampa Bay Rowdies | D.C. United | Transfer |
| December 6, 2024 | (United States) Ian James | (United States) Sporting Kansas City II | Sporting Kansas City | Homegrown player |
| December 6, 2024 | (United States) Jack Kortkamp | (United States) Sporting Kansas City II | Sporting Kansas City | Homegrown player |
| December 9, 2024 | (Colombia) Tomás Ángel | Los Angeles FC | San Diego FC | Trade |
| December 9, 2024 | (Nigeria) Chidozie Awaziem | FC Cincinnati | Colorado Rapids | Trade |
| December 9, 2024 | (United States) Luis Barraza | New York City FC | D.C. United | Trade |
| December 9, 2024 | (United States) Ian Harkes | New England Revolution | San Jose Earthquakes | Trade |
| December 9, 2024 | (Canada) Mark-Anthony Kaye | New England Revolution | San Jose Earthquakes | Trade |
| December 9, 2024 | (United States) Ian Murphy | FC Cincinnati | Colorado Rapids | Trade |
| December 9, 2024 | (United States) Dave Romney | New England Revolution | San Jose Earthquakes | Trade |
| December 9, 2024 | (Panama) Omar Valencia | (United States) New York Red Bulls II | New York Red Bulls | Free |
| December 9, 2024 | (United States) Tyler Wolff | Atlanta United FC | Real Salt Lake | Trade |
| December 10, 2024 | (United States) Adri Mehmeti | (United States) New York Red Bulls II | New York Red Bulls | Homegrown player |
| December 10, 2024 | (United States) Jude Terry | (United States) Los Angeles FC 2 | Los Angeles FC | Homegrown player |
| December 11, 2024 | (Brazil) Thiago Andrade | New York City FC | San Diego FC | Expansion draft |
| December 11, 2024 | (Brazil) Thiago Andrade | San Diego FC | Toronto FC | Trade |
| December 11, 2024 | (Norway) Heine Gikling Bruseth | Orlando City SC | San Diego FC | Expansion draft |
| December 11, 2024 | (United States) Leo Burney | (United States) Penn Quakers | Seattle Sounders FC | Homegrown player |
| December 11, 2024 | (Senegal) Hamady Diop | Charlotte FC | San Diego FC | Expansion draft |
| December 11, 2024 | (United States) CJ dos Santos | Inter Miami CF | San Diego FC | Trade |
| December 11, 2024 | (Japan) Hosei Kijima | St. Louis City SC | San Diego FC | Expansion draft |
| December 11, 2024 | (Japan) Hosei Kijima | San Diego FC | D.C. United | Trade |
| December 11, 2024 | (Germany) Jasper Löffelsend | Colorado Rapids | San Diego FC | Expansion draft |
| December 11, 2024 | (Sweden) Christopher McVey | D.C. United | San Diego FC | Trade |
| December 11, 2024 | (United States) David Poreba | (United States) Chicago Fire FC II | Chicago Fire FC | Free |
| December 11, 2024 | (United States) Travian Sousa | (United States) Tacoma Defiance | Seattle Sounders FC | Free |
| December 12, 2024 | (Colombia) Andrés Reyes | New York Red Bulls | San Diego FC | Trade |
| December 13, 2024 | (Ghana) Forster Ajago | Nashville SC | Real Salt Lake | Re-Entry Draft Stage 1 |
| December 13, 2024 | (United States) Jacob Jackson | San Jose Earthquakes | San Diego FC | Re-Entry Draft Stage 1 |
| December 13, 2024 | (United States) Kipp Keller | FC Cincinnati | Minnesota United FC | Re-Entry Draft Stage 1 |
| December 16, 2024 | (England) Jack Elliott | Philadelphia Union | Chicago Fire FC | Free |
| December 16, 2024 | (United States) Colin Guske | (United States) Orlando City B | Orlando City SC | Homegrown player |
| December 16, 2024 | (Brazil) Pedrinho | (United States) North Texas SC | FC Dallas | Free |
| December 17, 2024 | (Guyana) Omari Glasgow | (United States) Chicago Fire FC II | Chicago Fire FC | Free |
| December 17, 2024 | (United States) Jimmy Maurer | FC Dallas | Houston Dynamo FC | Free |
| December 18, 2024 | (United States) Nick Lima | New England Revolution | San Jose Earthquakes | Free |
| December 18, 2024 | (Canada) Lukas MacNaughton | Nashville SC | D.C. United | Trade |
| December 18, 2024 | (United States) Jackson Yueill | San Jose Earthquakes | New England Revolution | Free |
| December 19, 2024 | (Ghana) Lalas Abubakar | Colorado Rapids | FC Dallas | Free |
| December 19, 2024 | (Uruguay) Gastón Brugman | LA Galaxy | Nashville SC | Trade |
| December 19, 2024 | (Ecuador) Leo Campana | Inter Miami CF | New England Revolution | Trade |
| December 19, 2024 | (United States) Sean Davis | Nashville SC | LA Galaxy | Trade |
| December 19, 2024 | (Panama) Aníbal Godoy | Nashville SC | San Diego FC | Free |
| December 20, 2024 | (United States) Tanner Beason | San Jose Earthquakes | New England Revolution | Free |
| December 20, 2024 | (United States) Dean Boltz | (United States) Wisconsin Badgers | Chicago Fire FC | SuperDraft |
| December 20, 2024 | (United States) Alex Bono | D.C. United | New England Revolution | Free |
| December 20, 2024 | (United States) Dylan Borso | (United States) Wake Forest Demon Deacons | Chicago Fire FC | Homegrown player |
| December 20, 2024 | (Ghana) Manu Duah | (United States) UC Santa Barbara Gauchos | San Diego FC | SuperDraft |
| December 20, 2024 | (United States) Max Floriani | (United States) Saint Louis Billikens | San Jose Earthquakes | SuperDraft |
| December 20, 2024 | (United States) Alex Harris | (United States) Cornell Big Red | Colorado Rapids | SuperDraft |
| December 20, 2024 | (United States) Tate Johnson | (United States) North Carolina Tar Heels | Vancouver Whitecaps FC | SuperDraft |
| December 20, 2024 | (Poland) Mateusz Klich | D.C. United | Atlanta United FC | Trade |
| December 20, 2024 | (Brazil) Elias Manoel | New York Red Bulls | Real Salt Lake | Trade |
| December 20, 2024 | (United States) Will Reilly | (United States) Stanford Cardinal | Atlanta United FC | Homegrown player |
| December 23, 2024 | (United States) Jeremy Ebobisse | San Jose Earthquakes | Los Angeles FC | Free |
| December 23, 2024 | (Ecuador) Anderson Julio | Real Salt Lake | FC Dallas | Trade |
| December 23, 2024 | (United States) Sam Junqua | FC Dallas | Real Salt Lake | Trade |
| December 23, 2024 | (Costa Rica) Ariel Lassiter | Chicago Fire FC | Portland Timbers | Free |
| December 27, 2024 | (United States) Isaiah Foster | FC Cincinnati | (United States) Colorado Springs Switchbacks FC | Free |
| December 27, 2024 | (United States) Shaq Moore | Nashville SC | FC Dallas | Trade |
| December 30, 2024 | (United States) Earl Edwards Jr. | New England Revolution | San Jose Earthquakes | Trade |
| December 31, 2024 | (Spain) Hugo Bacharach | Minnesota United FC | (United States) Rhode Island FC | Free |
| December 31, 2024 | (United States) Derek Dodson | Minnesota United FC | D.C. United | Re-Entry Draft Stage 2 |
| December 31, 2024 | (Haiti) Fafà Picault | Vancouver Whitecaps FC | Inter Miami CF | Free |
| December 31, 2024 | (Spain) Ilie Sánchez | Los Angeles FC | Austin FC | Free |
| January 1, 2025 | (Uruguay) Nicolás Acevedo | New York City FC | (Brazil) Bahia | Transfer |
| January 1, 2025 | (United States) Samuel Adeniran | Philadelphia Union | (Austria) LASK | Free |
| January 1, 2025 | (Germany) Timo Baumgartl | (Germany) Schalke 04 | St. Louis City SC | Free |
| January 1, 2025 | (Brazil) Ramiro Benetti | (Brazil) Cruzeiro | FC Dallas | Free |
| January 1, 2025 | (Colombia) Dylan Borrero | New England Revolution | (Brazil) Fortaleza | Free |
| January 1, 2025 | (France) Rémi Cabral | Colorado Rapids | (United States) Phoenix Rising FC | Free |
| January 1, 2025 | (Colombia) Brayan Ceballos | (Brazil) Fortaleza | New England Revolution | Transfer |
| January 1, 2025 | (Cameroon) Eric Maxim Choupo-Moting | (Germany) Bayern Munich | New York Red Bulls | Free |
| January 1, 2025 | (Colombia) Cristian Dájome | D.C. United | (Mexico) Santos Laguna | Free |
| January 1, 2025 | (United States) Bajung Darboe | Los Angeles FC | (Germany) Bayern Munich | Transfer |
| January 1, 2025 | (Togo) Kévin Denkey | (Belgium) Cercle Brugge | FC Cincinnati | Transfer |
| January 1, 2025 | (Mali) Mamadou Fofana | (France) Amiens | New England Revolution | Transfer |
| January 1, 2025 | (Paraguay) Gastón Giménez | Chicago Fire FC | (Paraguay) Cerro Porteño | Free |
| January 1, 2025 | (Argentina) Ian Glavinovich | (Argentina) Newell's Old Boys | Philadelphia Union | Loan |
| January 1, 2025 | (Paraguay) Diego Gómez | Inter Miami CF | (England) Brighton & Hove Albion | Transfer |
| January 1, 2025 | (Argentina) Franco Ibarra | Atlanta United FC | (Argentina) Rosario Central | Free |
| January 1, 2025 | (Denmark) Marcus Ingvartsen | (Denmark) FC Nordsjælland | San Diego FC | Transfer |
| January 1, 2025 | (United States) Logan Ketterer | CF Montréal | (United States) Lexington SC | Free |
| January 1, 2025 | (Greece) Georgios Koutsias | Chicago Fire FC | (Switzerland) FC Lugano | Loan |
| January 1, 2025 | (Costa Rica) Marvin Loría | Portland Timbers | (Costa Rica) Saprissa | Free |
| January 1, 2025 | (Mexico) Hirving Lozano | (Netherlands) PSV | San Diego FC | Transfer |
| January 1, 2025 | (Sweden) Mikael Marqués | Minnesota United FC | (Sweden) Västerås SK | Transfer |
| January 1, 2025 | (Argentina) Luca Orellano | (Brazil) Vasco da Gama | FC Cincinnati | Transfer |
| January 1, 2025 | (Brazil) João Peglow | (Poland) Radomiak Radom | D.C. United | Transfer |
| January 1, 2025 | (Costa Rica) Damian Rivera | New England Revolution | (United States) Phoenix Rising FC | Free |
| January 1, 2025 | (United States) Tanner Rosborough | (United States) New York Red Bulls II | New York Red Bulls | Homegrown player |
| January 1, 2025 | (United States) James Sands | New York City FC | (Germany) FC St. Pauli | Loan |
| January 1, 2025 | (Mexico) Pablo Sisniega | (United States) San Antonio FC | San Diego FC | Free |
| January 1, 2025 | (Argentina) Santiago Sosa | Atlanta United FC | (Argentina) Racing Club | Transfer |
| January 1, 2025 | (Norway) Edvard Tagseth | (Norway) Rosenborg | Nashville SC | Free |
| January 1, 2025 | (Mexico) Miguel Tapias | Minnesota United FC | (Mexico) Guadalajara | Transfer |
| January 1, 2025 | (Uruguay) Facundo Torres | Orlando City SC | (Brazil) Palmeiras | Transfer |
| January 1, 2025 | (Denmark) Jeppe Tverskov | (Denmark) FC Nordsjælland | San Diego FC | Transfer |
| January 1, 2025 | (Colombia) Jhojan Valencia | Austin FC | (Chile) Universidad Católica | Free |
| January 2, 2025 | (Bosnia and Herzegovina) Esmir Bajraktarević | New England Revolution | (Netherlands) PSV | Transfer |
| January 2, 2025 | (Costa Rica) Luis Díaz | (Costa Rica) Saprissa | New England Revolution | Free |
| January 2, 2025 | (Canada) Levonte Johnson | Vancouver Whitecaps FC | (United States) Colorado Springs Switchbacks FC | Free |
| January 2, 2025 | (Colombia) Jesús Murillo | Los Angeles FC | (Mexico) FC Juárez | Free |
| January 2, 2025 | (Denmark) Tobias Salquist | Chicago Fire FC | (Denmark) FC Nordsjælland | Transfer |
| January 3, 2025 | (United States) Matai Akinmboni | D.C. United | (England) AFC Bournemouth | Transfer |
| January 3, 2025 | (Germany) Fabian Herbers | Chicago Fire FC | CF Montréal | Free |
| January 3, 2025 | (United States) Donovan Parisian | (United States) San Diego Toreros | New England Revolution | SuperDraft |
| January 3, 2025 | (Paraguay) Matías Rojas | Inter Miami CF | (Argentina) River Plate | Free |
| January 3, 2025 | (Tunisia) Anisse Saidi | (United States) Philadelphia Union Academy | San Diego FC | Homegrown player |
| January 3, 2025 | (Haiti) Carl Sainté | FC Dallas | (United States) Phoenix Rising FC | Loan |
| January 4, 2025 | (Nigeria) Michael Adedokun | (United States) Ohio State Buckeyes | CF Montréal | SuperDraft |
| January 4, 2025 | (Uruguay) Matías Cóccaro | CF Montréal | (Mexico) Atlas | Loan |
| January 5, 2025 | (Costa Rica) Alejandro Bran | Minnesota United FC | (Costa Rica) Alajuelense | Loan |
| January 5, 2025 | (Mexico) Omar Campos | Los Angeles FC | (Mexico) Cruz Azul | Transfer |
| January 6, 2025 | (Ghana) Emmanuel Boateng | New England Revolution | San Diego FC | Trade |
| January 6, 2025 | (United States) Jalen Neal | LA Galaxy | CF Montréal | Trade |
| January 6, 2025 | (United States) Brandon Vazquez | (Mexico) Monterrey | Austin FC | Transfer |
| January 6, 2025 | (Denmark) Philip Zinckernagel | (Belgium) Club Brugge | Chicago Fire FC | Transfer |
| January 7, 2025 | (United States) Sam Bassett | (United States) Denver Pioneers | Colorado Rapids | Homegrown player |
| January 7, 2025 | (Poland) Wiktor Bogacz | (Poland) Miedź Legnica | New York Red Bulls | Transfer |
| January 7, 2025 | (Argentina) Franco Negri | Inter Miami CF | San Diego FC | Re-Entry Draft Stage 2 |
| January 7, 2025 | (Mexico) Alan Pulido | Sporting Kansas City | (Mexico) Guadalajara | Transfer |
| January 7, 2025 | (Albania) Giacomo Vrioni | New England Revolution | CF Montréal | Trade |
| January 8, 2025 | (Honduras) Bryan Acosta | (Honduras) Real España | Nashville SC | Transfer |
| January 8, 2025 | (Brazil) Léo Chú | Seattle Sounders FC | FC Dallas | Trade |
| January 8, 2025 | (United States) Jesús Ferreira | FC Dallas | Seattle Sounders FC | Trade |
| January 8, 2025 | (United States) Hakim Karamoko | (United States) NC State Wolfpack | D.C. United | SuperDraft |
| January 8, 2025 | (Finland) Lassi Lappalainen | CF Montréal | Columbus Crew | Free |
| January 8, 2025 | (Japan) Cayman Togashi | (Japan) Sagan Tosu | Atlanta United FC | Free |
| January 8, 2025 | (Finland) Jere Uronen | Charlotte FC | (Sweden) AIK | Transfer |
| January 9, 2025 | (Poland) Daniel Baran | (United States) North Texas SC | FC Dallas | Homegrown player |
| January 9, 2025 | (United States) Jacob Bartlett | (United States) Sporting Kansas City II | Sporting Kansas City | Homegrown player |
| January 9, 2025 | (United States) Michael Collodi | (United States) North Texas SC | FC Dallas | Homegrown player |
| January 9, 2025 | (United States) Diego García | (United States) North Texas SC | FC Dallas | Homegrown player |
| January 9, 2025 | (South Korea) Kim Jun-hong | (South Korea) Jeonbuk Hyundai Motors | D.C. United | Transfer |
| January 9, 2025 | (United States) Malachi Molina | (United States) North Texas SC | FC Dallas | Homegrown player |
| January 9, 2025 | (United States) Diego Pepi | (United States) North Texas SC | FC Dallas | Homegrown player |
| January 9, 2025 | (United States) Anthony Ramirez | (United States) North Texas SC | FC Dallas | Homegrown player |
| January 10, 2025 | (United States) Jacob Arroyave | (United States) New York City FC II | New York City FC | Homegrown player |
| January 10, 2025 | (United States) Prince Amponsah | (United States) Wake Forest Demon Deacons | New York City FC | Homegrown player |
| January 10, 2025 | (England) Matt Crooks | Real Salt Lake | (England) Hull City | Transfer |
| January 10, 2025 | (Ecuador) Patrickson Delgado | (Ecuador) Independiente del Valle | FC Dallas | Transfer |
| January 10, 2025 | (Cameroon) Ignatius Ganago | (France) FC Nantes | New England Revolution | Loan |
| January 10, 2025 | (Dominican Republic) Xavier Valdez | Houston Dynamo FC | Nashville SC | End-of-Year Waivers |
| January 11, 2025 | (Colombia) Cristian Arango | Real Salt Lake | San Jose Earthquakes | Trade |
| January 12, 2025 | (Colombia) Déiber Caicedo | Vancouver Whitecaps FC | (Colombia) Atlético Junior | Transfer |
| January 13, 2025 | (Brazil) Thiago Andrade | Toronto FC | (Japan) Cerezo Osaka | Transfer |
| January 13, 2025 | (Cameroon) Tah Brian Anunga | Nashville SC | FC Cincinnati | Free |
| January 13, 2025 | (United States) Paul Arriola | FC Dallas | Seattle Sounders FC | Trade |
| January 13, 2025 | (Spain) Pep Biel | (Greece) Olympiacos | Charlotte FC | Loan |
| January 13, 2025 | (United States) Kobi Henry | (France) Stade Reims | Real Salt Lake | Loan |
| January 13, 2025 | (Norway) Odin Thiago Holm | (Scotland) Celtic F.C. | Los Angeles FC | Loan |
| January 13, 2025 | (Venezuela) Josef Martínez | CF Montréal | San Jose Earthquakes | Free |
| January 13, 2025 | (Germany) Prince Owusu | Toronto FC | CF Montréal | Trade |
| January 13, 2025 | (Colombia) Jeisson Palacios | (Colombia) América de Cali | Nashville SC | Transfer |
| January 13, 2025 | (United States) Sam Rogers | (Norway) Lillestrøm SK | Chicago Fire FC | Transfer |
| January 13, 2025 | (United States) Mason Toye | Portland Timbers | Sporting Kansas City | Free |
| January 13, 2025 | (Finland) Onni Valakari | (Cyprus) Pafos FC | San Diego FC | Loan |
| January 14, 2025 | (Argentina) Tadeo Allende | (Spain) Celta Vigo | Inter Miami CF | Loan |
| January 14, 2025 | (United States) Alejandro Alvarado Jr. | (Portugal) Vizela | San Diego FC | Transfer |
| January 14, 2025 | (Portugal) Leonardo Barroso | (Portugal) Sporting CP B | Chicago Fire FC | Transfer |
| January 14, 2025 | (Canada) Theo Corbeanu | (Spain) Granada CF | Toronto FC | Loan |
| January 14, 2025 | (United States) Erik Dueñas | Los Angeles FC | Houston Dynamo FC | End-of-Year Waivers |
| January 14, 2025 | (Costa Rica) Randall Leal | Nashville SC | D.C. United | Waivers |
| January 14, 2025 | (United States) Wyatt Omsberg | Chicago Fire FC | New England Revolution | Free |
| January 14, 2025 | (Iceland) Nökkvi Þeyr Þórisson | St. Louis City SC | (Netherlands) Sparta Rotterdam | Loan |
| January 14, 2025 | (United States) Reid Roberts | (United States) San Francisco Dons | San Jose Earthquakes | SuperDraft |
| January 15, 2025 | (United States) Chris Applewhite | (United States) Huntsville City FC | Nashville SC | Homegrown player |
| January 15, 2025 | (United States) Leon Flach | Philadelphia Union | (Poland) Jagiellonia Białystok | Free |
| January 15, 2025 | (Denmark) Mathias Jørgensen | (Belgium) Anderlecht | LA Galaxy | Transfer |
| January 15, 2025 | (Ecuador) Joao Ortiz | (Ecuador) Independiente del Valle | Portland Timbers | Transfer |
| January 15, 2025 | (Australia) Kye Rowles | (Scotland) Heart of Midlothian | D.C. United | Transfer |
| January 15, 2025 | (United States) Mason Stajduhar | Orlando City SC | Real Salt Lake | Trade |
| January 15, 2025 | (United States) Eryk Williamson | Portland Timbers | Charlotte FC | Trade |
| January 16, 2025 | (Panama) Adalberto Carrasquilla | Houston Dynamo FC | (Mexico) UNAM | Transfer |
| January 16, 2025 | (Argentina) Nicolás Dubersarsky | (Argentina) Instituto | Austin FC | Transfer |
| January 16, 2025 | (Argentina) Gonzalo Luján | (Argentina) San Lorenzo | Inter Miami CF | Transfer |
| January 16, 2025 | (United States) JT Marcinkowski | San Jose Earthquakes | LA Galaxy | Free |
| January 16, 2025 | (Honduras) Andy Najar | (Honduras) C.D. Olimpia | Nashville SC | Transfer |
| January 16, 2025 | (Argentina) Rocco Ríos Novo | (Argentina) Lanús | Inter Miami CF | Loan |
| January 16, 2025 | (United States) John Tolkin | New York Red Bulls | (Germany) Holstein Kiel | Transfer |
| January 16, 2025 | (Argentina) Maximiliano Urruti | (Argentina) Platense | New England Revolution | Free |
| January 17, 2025 | (United States) Obafemi Awodesu | (United States) Houston Dynamo 2 | Houston Dynamo FC | Free |
| January 17, 2025 | (Argentina) Sebastián Driussi | Austin FC | (Argentina) River Plate | Transfer |
| January 17, 2025 | (Mexico) Emi Ochoa | San Jose Earthquakes | (Mexico) Cruz Azul | Transfer |
| January 17, 2025 | (Colombia) Nicolás Rodríguez | (Colombia) Fortaleza CEIF | Orlando City SC | Transfer |
| January 17, 2025 | (Venezuela) Telasco Segovia | (Portugal) Casa Pia | Inter Miami CF | Transfer |
| January 17, 2025 | (United States) Kaedren Spivery | (United States) San Jose Earthquakes Academy | San Jose Earthquakes | Homegrown player |
| January 17, 2025 | (Norway) Conrad Wallem | (Czech Republic) Slavia Prague | St. Louis City SC | Loan |
| January 20, 2025 | (United States) Grayson Doody | CF Montréal | (United States) Orange County SC | Free |
| January 20, 2025 | (Venezuela) Miguel Navarro | Colorado Rapids | (Argentina) Talleres | Transfer |
| January 21, 2025 | (Ivory Coast) Jonathan Bamba | (Spain) Celta Vigo | Chicago Fire FC | Transfer |
| January 21, 2025 | (Brazil) Rafael Cabral | (Brazil) Cruzeiro | Real Salt Lake | Free |
| January 21, 2025 | (United States) Luca de la Torre | (Spain) Celta Vigo | San Diego FC | Loan |
| January 21, 2025 | (Paraguay) Sebastián Ferreira | Houston Dynamo FC | (Argentina) Rosario Central | Free |
| January 21, 2025 | (Brazil) Igor Jesus | (Portugal) Estrela da Amadora | Los Angeles FC | Transfer |
| January 21, 2025 | (Sweden) Besard Šabović | (Sweden) Djurgårdens IF | Austin FC | Transfer |
| January 22, 2025 | (United States) Gavin Beavers | Real Salt Lake | (Denmark) Brøndby IF | Transfer |
| January 22, 2025 | (United States) Mark Delgado | LA Galaxy | Los Angeles FC | Trade |
| January 22, 2025 | (Denmark) Anders Dreyer | (Belgium) Anderlecht | San Diego FC | Transfer |
| January 22, 2025 | (Venezuela) Kevin Kelsy | (Ukraine) Shakhtar Donetsk | Portland Timbers | Transfer |
| January 22, 2025 | (Belarus) Stanislav Lapkes | (United States) Columbus Crew 2 | Columbus Crew | Homegrown player |
| January 22, 2025 | (United States) Damario McIntosh | (United States) New England Revolution II | New England Revolution | Homegrown player |
| January 22, 2025 | (United States) Robert Turdean | (United States) Chicago Fire Academy | Chicago Fire FC | Homegrown player |
| January 22, 2025 | (Ivory Coast) Wilfried Zaha | (Turkey) Galatasaray | Charlotte FC | Loan |
| January 23, 2025 | (Uganda) Allan Oyirwoth | (Uganda) MYDA FC | New England Revolution | Transfer |
| January 23, 2025 | (Australia) Ariath Piol | (Australia) Macarthur FC | Real Salt Lake | Transfer |
| January 23, 2025 | (United States) Brian Schwake | (Spain) CD Castellón | Nashville SC | Transfer |
| January 23, 2025 | (Poland) Karol Świderski | Charlotte FC | (Greece) Panathinaikos | Transfer |
| January 23, 2025 | (United States) Nkosi Tafari | FC Dallas | Los Angeles FC | Trade |
| January 23, 2025 | (Argentina) Alan Velasco | FC Dallas | (Argentina) Boca Juniors | Transfer |
| January 24, 2025 | (Mali) Rominigue Kouamé | (Spain) Cádiz CF | Chicago Fire FC | Loan |
| January 24, 2025 | (Canada) Jayden Nelson | (Norway) Rosenborg BK | Vancouver Whitecaps FC | Transfer |
| January 24, 2025 | (United States) Enzo Newman | (United States) Oregon State Beavers | FC Dallas | SuperDraft |
| January 24, 2025 | (Finland) Teemu Pukki | Minnesota United FC | (Finland) HJK | Transfer |
| January 24, 2025 | (Albania) Myrto Uzuni | (Spain) Granada CF | Austin FC | Transfer |
| January 24, 2025 | (Belgium) Dante Vanzeir | New York Red Bulls | (Belgium) Gent | Transfer |
| January 24, 2025 | (Ghana) Yaw Yeboah | Columbus Crew | San Diego FC | Re-Entry Draft Stage 2 |
| January 24, 2025 | (Ghana) Yaw Yeboah | San Diego FC | Los Angeles FC | Trade |
| January 25, 2025 | (Poland) Mateusz Bogusz | Los Angeles FC | (Mexico) Cruz Azul | Transfer |
| January 26, 2025 | (Argentina) Federico Navarro | Chicago Fire FC | (Argentina) Rosario Central | Transfer |
| January 26, 2025 | (United States) Elijah Wynder | (United States) Louisville City FC | LA Galaxy | Transfer |
| January 27, 2025 | (Colombia) Marino Hinestroza | Columbus Crew | (Colombia) Atlético Nacional | Transfer |
| January 27, 2025 | (England) Christian McFarlane | New York City FC | (England) Manchester City | Transfer |
| January 27, 2025 | (United States) Ian Pilcher | (United States) Charlotte 49ers | San Diego FC | SuperDraft |
| January 28, 2025 | (Israel) Ilay Feingold | (Israel) Maccabi Haifa | New England Revolution | Transfer |
| January 28, 2025 | (South Korea) Kim Kee-hee | (South Korea) Ulsan Hyundai | Seattle Sounders FC | Free |
| January 28, 2025 | (Canada) Victor Loturi | (Scotland) Ross County | CF Montréal | Free |
| January 28, 2025 | (Ukraine) Hennadiy Synchuk | (Ukraine) Metalist Kharkiv | CF Montréal | Transfer |
| January 29, 2025 | (United States) Moses Nyeman | Minnesota United FC | (United States) Loudoun United | Free |
| January 30, 2025 | (Paraguay) Miguel Almirón | (England) Newcastle United | Atlanta United FC | Transfer |
| January 30, 2025 | (Canada) Raheem Edwards | CF Montréal | New York Red Bulls | Free |
| January 30, 2025 | (Argentina) Nicolás Romero | (Argentina) Atlético Tucumán | Minnesota United FC | Transfer |
| January 31, 2025 | (Scotland) Stuart Armstrong | Vancouver Whitecaps FC | (England) Sheffield Wednesday | Transfer |
| January 31, 2025 | (Italy) Gabriele Corbo | CF Montréal | (Spain) Córdoba CF | Free |
| January 31, 2025 | (Argentina) Facundo Farías | Inter Miami CF | (Argentina) Estudiantes | Transfer |
| January 31, 2025 | (Paraguay) Gilberto Flores | (Paraguay) Libertad | FC Cincinnati | Transfer |
| January 31, 2025 | (Germany) Alexander Hack | (Saudi Arabia) Al Qadsiah | New York Red Bulls | Free |
| January 31, 2025 | (Serbia) Jovan Mijatović | New York City FC | (Belgium) OH Leuven | Loan |
| January 31, 2025 | (Romania) Enes Sali | FC Dallas | (Saudi Arabia) Al-Riyadh | Loan |
| January 31, 2025 | (United States) Ian Smith | (United States) Denver Pioneers | Portland Timbers | SuperDraft |
| February 1, 2025 | (Uruguay) Maximiliano Falcón | (Chile) Colo-Colo | Inter Miami CF | Transfer |
| February 1, 2025 | (Serbia) Dejan Joveljić | LA Galaxy | Sporting Kansas City | Trade |
| February 1, 2025 | (South Korea) Hoyeon Jung | (South Korea) Gwangju FC | Minnesota United FC | Transfer |
| February 1, 2025 | (Brazil) João Pedro | Charlotte FC | (Portugal) Rio Ave | Loan |
| February 3, 2025 | (Spain) Manu García | (Greece) Aris | Sporting Kansas City | Transfer |
| February 3, 2025 | (Colombia) Cucho Hernández | Columbus Crew | (Spain) Real Betis | Transfer |
| February 3, 2025 | (United States) Jack McGlynn | Philadelphia Union | Houston Dynamo FC | Trade |
| February 3, 2025 | (Russia) Shapi Suleymanov | (Greece) Aris | Sporting Kansas City | Transfer |
| February 4, 2025 | (Colombia) Jimer Fory | (Colombia) Independiente Medellín | Portland Timbers | Transfer |
| February 4, 2025 | (Ecuador) Carlos Gruezo | San Jose Earthquakes | (Ecuador) L.D.U. Quito | Free |
| February 4, 2025 | (Ivory Coast) Emmanuel Latte Lath | (England) Middlesbrough | Atlanta United FC | Transfer |
| February 4, 2025 | (United States) Neil Pierre | (United States) Philadelphia Union II | Philadelphia Union | Homegrown player |
| February 5, 2025 | (Canada) Owen Graham-Roache | (Canada) CF Montréal Academy | CF Montréal | Homegrown player |
| February 5, 2025 | (Serbia) Jovan Lukić | (Serbia) Spartak Subotica | Philadelphia Union | Transfer |
| February 5, 2025 | (Croatia) Marco Pašalić | (Croatia) HNK Rijeka | Orlando City SC | Transfer |
| February 6, 2025 | (Argentina) Álvaro Barreal | FC Cincinnati | (Brazil) Santos FC | Loan |
| February 6, 2025 | (Slovakia) Matúš Kmeť | Minnesota United FC | (Poland) Górnik Zabrze | Loan |
| February 6, 2025 | (Chile) Marcelo Morales | Universidad de Chile | New York Red Bulls | Transfer |
| February 6, 2025 | (United States) Tim Parker | New England Revolution | New York Red Bulls | Free |
| February 6, 2025 | (Austria) Alessandro Schöpf | Vancouver Whitecaps FC | (Austria) Wolfsberger AC | Free |
| February 6, 2025 | (United States) Dante Sealy | FC Dallas | CF Montréal | Free |
| February 6, 2025 | (United States) Frankie Westfield | (United States) Philadelphia Union II | Philadelphia Union | Homegrown player |
| February 7, 2025 | (United States) Brandan Craig | Philadelphia Union | CF Montréal | Free |
| February 7, 2025 | (Canada) Adisa De Rosario | (Canada) Toronto FC II | Toronto FC | Homegrown player |
| February 7, 2025 | (United States) Omar Gonzalez | FC Dallas | Chicago Fire FC | Free |
| February 7, 2025 | (Canada) Luca Petrasso | Orlando City SC | CF Montréal | Free |
| February 8, 2025 | (Ghana) Ali Fadal | (Spain) Valencia | Colorado Rapids | Transfer |
| February 8, 2025 | (Uruguay) Lucas Sanabria | (Uruguay) Nacional | LA Galaxy | Transfer |
| February 10, 2025 | (Colombia) Eduard Atuesta | (Brazil) Palmeiras | Orlando City SC | Transfer |
| February 10, 2025 | (United States) Theodore Ku-DiPietro | D.C. United | Colorado Rapids | Trade |
| February 10, 2025 | (Ghana) Willy Kumado | (Denmark) Lyngby BK | San Diego FC | Transfer |
| February 11, 2025 | (United States) Matthew Corcoran | (United States) Birmingham Legion FC | Nashville SC | Transfer |
| February 11, 2025 | (United States) Eddy Davis III | (United States) Philadelphia Union II | Philadelphia Union | Homegrown player |
| February 11, 2025 | (France) Owen Gene | (France) Amiens SC | Minnesota United FC | Transfer |
| February 11, 2025 | (United States) Emmanuel Sabbi | (France) Le Havre | Vancouver Whitecaps FC | Transfer |
| February 11, 2025 | (United States) Brandon Servania | Toronto FC | D.C. United | Free |
| February 11, 2025 | (Netherlands) Osaze Urhoghide | (France) Amiens SC | FC Dallas | Transfer |
| February 11, 2025 | (Brazil) Júnior Urso | Charlotte FC | Houston Dynamo FC | Free |
| February 12, 2025 | (Argentina) Luciano Acosta | FC Cincinnati | FC Dallas | Trade |
| February 12, 2025 | (United States) Christian Ramirez | Columbus Crew | LA Galaxy | Trade |
| February 13, 2025 | (United States) Jansen Miller | (United States) Indiana Hoosiers | Sporting Kansas City | SuperDraft |
| February 14, 2025 | (Denmark) Lukas Engel | (England) Middlesbrough | FC Cincinnati | Loan |
| February 14, 2025 | (Uruguay) Cristian Olivera | Los Angeles FC | (Brazil) Grêmio | Transfer |
| February 14, 2025 | (Ukraine) Artem Smolyakov | (Ukraine) Polissya Zhytomyr | Los Angeles FC | Transfer |
| February 14, 2025 | (United States) Adrian Zendejas | (Sweden) Skövde AIK | Vancouver Whitecaps FC | Free |
| February 15, 2025 | (United States) Josh Atencio | Seattle Sounders FC | Colorado Rapids | Trade |
| February 15, 2025 | (Norway) Ola Brynhildsen | (Denmark) FC Midtjylland | Toronto FC | Loan |
| February 17, 2025 | (Portugal) David da Costa | (France) RC Lens | Portland Timbers | Transfer |
| February 17, 2025 | (Brazil) Evander | Portland Timbers | FC Cincinnati | Trade |
| February 17, 2025 | (France) Joran Gerbet | (United States) Clemson Tigers | Orlando City SC | SuperDraft |
| February 17, 2025 | (United States) Max Kerkvliet | (United States) UConn Huskies | Real Salt Lake | SuperDraft |
| February 17, 2025 | (United States) Jonathan Lewis | Colorado Rapids | (England) Barnsley | Free |
| February 17, 2025 | (Mexico) Daniel Ríos | (Mexico) Guadalajara | Vancouver Whitecaps FC | Loan |
| February 18, 2025 | (Canada) Alessandro Biello | CF Montréal | (Canada) HFX Wanderers | Loan |
| February 18, 2025 | (United States) Christopher Cupps | (United States) Chicago Fire FC Academy | Chicago Fire FC | Homegrown player |
| February 18, 2025 | (Uruguay) Bruno Damiani | (Uruguay) Nacional | Philadelphia Union | Transfer |
| February 18, 2025 | (United States) Michael Halliday | Orlando City SC | Houston Dynamo FC | Trade |
| February 18, 2025 | (Sweden) Ahmed Qasem | (Sweden) IF Elfsborg | Nashville SC | Transfer |
| February 19, 2025 | (Uruguay) Nicolás Lodeiro | Orlando City SC | Houston Dynamo FC | Free |
| February 19, 2025 | (Brazil) Matheus Nascimento | (Brazil) Botafogo | LA Galaxy | Loan |
| February 20, 2025 | (United States) Andrew Brody | Real Salt Lake | Sporting Kansas City | Waivers |
| February 20, 2025 | (United States) Sal Olivas | (United States) Philadelphia Union II | Philadelphia Union | Homegrown player |
| February 20, 2025 | (United States) Mikah Thomas | (United States) UConn Huskies | Charlotte FC | SuperDraft |
| February 20, 2025 | (Turkey) Cengiz Ünder | (Turkey) Fenerbahçe | Los Angeles FC | Loan |
| February 21, 2025 | (United States) Nico Cavallo | (United States) UCLA Bruins | New York City FC | SuperDraft |
| February 21, 2025 | (Canada) Markus Cimermancic | (Canada) Toronto FC II | Toronto FC | Homegrown player |
| February 21, 2025 | (United States) Nick Fernandez | (United States) Portland Pilots | San Jose Earthquakes | SuperDraft |
| February 21, 2025 | (Antigua and Barbuda) Aiden Jarvis | (United States) New York Red Bulls II | New York Red Bulls | Homegrown player |
| February 21, 2025 | (United States) Beau Leroux | (United States) The Town FC | San Jose Earthquakes | Free |
| February 21, 2025 | (United States) Alfredo Morales | San Jose Earthquakes | St. Louis City SC | Free |
| February 21, 2025 | (United States) Francesco Montali | Philadelphia Union | San Jose Earthquakes | Trade |
| February 21, 2025 | (United States) Max Murray | (United States) Vermont Catamounts | New York City FC | SuperDraft |
| February 21, 2025 | (United States) Gavin Turner | (United States) Loudoun United | D.C. United | Homegrown player |
| February 21, 2025 | (United States) Indiana Vassilev | St. Louis City SC | Philadelphia Union | Trade |
| February 21, 2025 | (Canada) Rida Zouhir | CF Montréal | D.C. United | Free |
| February 22, 2025 | (Brazil) Micael | Houston Dynamo FC | (Brazil) Palmeiras | Transfer |
| February 22, 2025 | (England) Zane Monlouis | (England) Arsenal | Toronto FC | Transfer |
| February 22, 2025 | (Uruguay) Santiago Rodríguez | New York City FC | (Brazil) Botafogo | Transfer |
| February 22, 2025 | (United States) Joey Zalinsky | (United States) Rutgers Scarlet Knights | St. Louis City SC | SuperDraft |
| February 24, 2025 | (Canada) Adam Pearlman | Toronto FC | (Canada) HFX Wanderers | Loan |
| February 25, 2025 | (United States) Luca Bombino | Los Angeles FC | San Diego FC | Loan |
| February 26, 2025 | (Mexico) Fidel Barajas | (Mexico) Guadalajara | D.C. United | Loan |
| February 26, 2025 | (Canada) Aleksandr Guboglo | (Canada) CF Montréal Academy | CF Montréal | Homegrown player |
| February 26, 2025 | (Canada) Lazar Stefanovic | (Canada) Toronto FC II | Toronto FC | Homegrown player |
| February 27, 2025 | (Spain) Jesús Barea | (United States) Missouri State Bears | Real Salt Lake | SuperDraft |
| February 27, 2025 | (United States) Nelson Pierre | Philadelphia Union | (Canada) Whitecaps FC 2 | Loan |
| February 28, 2025 | (Canada) Emil Gazdov | (Canada) Pacific FC | CF Montréal | Transfer |
| March 3, 2025 | (Germany) Amar Sejdić | Nashville SC | Columbus Crew | Free |
| March 5, 2025 | (Brazil) Kaick | (Brazil) Grêmio | FC Dallas | Transfer |
| March 10, 2025 | (United States) Kalani Kossa-Rienzi | (United States) Tacoma Defiance | Seattle Sounders FC | Free |
| March 10, 2025 | (Argentina) Baltasar Rodríguez | (Argentina) Racing Club | Inter Miami CF | Loan |
| March 11, 2025 | (United States) Duane Holmes | (England) Preston North End | Houston Dynamo FC | Transfer |
| March 12, 2025 | (Ivory Coast) Souleyman Doumbia | (Belgium) Standard Liège | Charlotte FC | Loan |
| March 14, 2025 | (Canada) Max Anchor | Vancouver Whitecaps FC | (Canada) Pacific FC | Loan |
| March 14, 2025 | (Venezuela) Gustavo Caraballo | (United States) Orlando City B | Orlando City SC | Homegrown player |
| March 14, 2025 | (Australia) Brad Smith | Houston Dynamo FC | FC Cincinnati | Free |
| March 14, 2025 | (United States) Sam Williams | (United States) Chicago Fire FC II | Chicago Fire FC | Homegrown player |
| March 19, 2025 | (United States) Ousman Jabang | CF Montréal | (United States) New Mexico United | Transfer |
| March 20, 2025 | (Nigeria) Michael Adedokun | CF Montréal | (United States) Lexington SC | Loan |
| March 24, 2025 | (Finland) Leo Väisänen | Austin FC | (Sweden) BK Häcken | Transfer |
| March 25, 2025 | (Cameroon) Aaron Bibout | LA Galaxy | (Sweden) Västerås SK | Transfer |
| March 25, 2025 | (Ecuador) Allen Obando | (Ecuador) Barcelona S.C. | Inter Miami CF | Loan |
| March 27, 2025 | (Colombia) Pablo Ortiz | (Slovakia) DAC Dunajská Streda | Houston Dynamo FC | Loan |
| March 28, 2025 | (Czech Republic) Ondřej Lingr | (Czech Republic) Slavia Prague | Houston Dynamo FC | Transfer |
| March 31, 2025 | (England) Ryan Kent | (Turkey) Fenerbahçe | Seattle Sounders FC | Free |
| April 1, 2025 | (Ivory Coast) Djé D'Avilla | (Portugal) U.D. Leiria | Chicago Fire FC | Transfer |
| April 2, 2025 | (Canada) Nicolas Fleuriau Chateau | Vancouver Whitecaps FC | (Finland) Vaasan Palloseura | Loan |
| April 2, 2025 | (United States) Milan Iloski | (Denmark) FC Nordsjælland | San Diego FC | Loan |
| April 3, 2025 | (Switzerland) Maxime Dominguez | (Brazil) Vasco da Gama | Toronto FC | Loan |
| April 4, 2025 | (United States) Dominik Chong-Qui | (United States) Atlanta United 2 | Atlanta United FC | Homegrown player |
| April 4, 2025 | (United States) Bryce Jamison | (United States) Orange County SC | Colorado Rapids | Transfer |
| April 4, 2025 | (United States) Bryce Jamison | Colorado Rapids | (United States) Orange County SC | Loan |
| April 11, 2025 | (England) Jonathan Bond | (England) Watford | Houston Dynamo FC | Transfer |
| April 11, 2025 | (Hungary) Dániel Gazdag | Philadelphia Union | Columbus Crew | Trade |
| April 11, 2025 | (United States) Nicolas Hansen | (United States) Colorado Rapids 2 | Colorado Rapids | Transfer |
| April 11, 2025 | (United States) Riley Thomas | (United States) Austin FC II | Austin FC | Transfer |
| April 18, 2025 | (United States) Omir Fernandez | Colorado Rapids | Portland Timbers | Trade |
| April 21, 2025 | (United States) Oscar Verhoeven | San Jose Earthquakes | San Diego FC | Loan |
| April 22, 2025 | (United States) DeJuan Jones | Columbus Crew | San Jose Earthquakes | Trade |
| April 22, 2025 | (Mexico) Santiago Muñoz | (Mexico) Santos Laguna | Sporting Kansas City | Loan |
| April 23, 2025 | (Nigeria) William Agada | Sporting Kansas City | Real Salt Lake | Trade |
| April 23, 2025 | (United States) Frankie Amaya | (Mexico) Toluca | Los Angeles FC | Loan |
| April 23, 2025 | (England) Noel Buck | New England Revolution | San Jose Earthquakes | Trade |
| April 23, 2025 | (Canada) Jahkeele Marshall-Rutty | CF Montréal | Charlotte FC | Loan |
| April 23, 2025 | (England) Toyosi Olusanya | (Scotland) St. Mirren | Houston Dynamo FC | Transfer |
| April 23, 2025 | (Portugal) Xande Silva | Atlanta United FC | St. Louis City SC | Trade |
| April 23, 2025 | (Finland) Robert Taylor | Inter Miami CF | Austin FC | Trade |
| April 24, 2025 | (United States) Simon Becher | (Denmark) AC Horsens | St. Louis City SC | Transfer |
| April 24, 2025 | (Guatemala) Olger Escobar | New England Revolution | CF Montréal | Trade |
| April 24, 2025 | (Nigeria) Ibrahim Aliyu | Houston Dynamo FC | Columbus Crew | Trade |
| April 24, 2025 | (Canada) Ryan Raposo | Vancouver Whitecaps FC | Los Angeles FC | Free |
| April 25, 2025 | (Australia) Aiden O'Neill | (Belgium) Standard Liège | New York City FC | Transfer |
| April 25, 2025 | (Scotland) Johnny Russell | Sporting Kansas City | Real Salt Lake | Free |
| April 29, 2025 | (United States) Julian Gressel | Inter Miami CF | Minnesota United FC | Free |
| May 7, 2025 | (Brazil) Felipe Andrade | (Brazil) Fluminense | Houston Dynamo FC | Loan |
| May 8, 2025 | (Guyana) Osaze De Rosario | (United States) Tacoma Defiance | Seattle Sounders FC | Free |
| May 8, 2025 | (Mexico) Diego Rocio | Philadelphia Union | (United States) Real Monarchs | Trade |
| May 9, 2025 | (United States) Ben Bender | Charlotte FC | Philadelphia Union | Free |
| May 12, 2025 | (Sierra Leone) Kei Kamara | Los Angeles FC | FC Cincinnati | Free |
| May 17, 2025 | (United States) Zakaria Taifi | (United States) Orlando City B | Orlando City SC | Homegrown player |
| May 21, 2025 | (United States) Tate Schmitt | Houston Dynamo FC | Nashville SC | Free |
| May 21, 2025 | (United States) William Yarbrough | San Jose Earthquakes | Inter Miami CF | Free |
| May 23, 2025 | (United States) Eric Klein | (United States) New England Revolution II | New England Revolution | Homegrown player |
| May 27, 2025 | (Jamaica) Seymour Reid | (United States) New York City FC II | New York City FC | Homegrown player |
| May 31, 2025 | (Liberia) Darius Randell | (United States) Minnesota United FC 2 | Minnesota United FC | Homegrown player |
| June 10, 2025 | (United States) Tristan Brown | (United States) Columbus Crew 2 | Columbus Crew | Homegrown player |
| June 10, 2025 | (Netherlands) Javairô Dilrosun | (Mexico) Club América | Los Angeles FC | Loan |
| June 20, 2025 | (United States) Antonio Carrera | FC Dallas | (Mexico) UANL | Transfer |
| June 26, 2025 | (United States) Gage Guerra | (United States) Portland Timbers 2 | Portland Timbers | Free |
| June 28, 2025 | (Haiti) Nelson Pierre | Philadelphia Union | (Canada) Whitecaps FC 2 | Transfer |
| June 28, 2025 | (Haiti) Nelson Pierre | (Canada) Whitecaps FC 2 | Vancouver Whitecaps FC | Free |
| June 28, 2025 | (Netherlands) Wessel Speel | (United States) Minnesota United FC 2 | Minnesota United | Free |
| June 30, 2025 | (Switzerland) Nicky Beloko | (Switzerland) FC Luzern | Austin FC | Free |
| July 1, 2025 | (France) Olivier Giroud | Los Angeles FC | (France) Lille | Free |
| July 1, 2025 | (Canada) Nathan Saliba | CF Montréal | (Belgium) Anderlecht | Transfer |
| July 1, 2025 | (Bulgaria) Dominik Yankov | CF Montréal | (Croatia) Rijeka | Transfer |
| July 2, 2025 | (Albania) Enea Mihaj | (Portugal) Famalicão | Atlanta United FC | Free |
| July 3, 2025 | (Argentina) Claudio Bravo | Portland Timbers | (Argentina) Argentinos Juniors | Transfer |
| July 5, 2025 | (France) Kenji Mboma Dem | (United States) FC Cincinnati 2 | FC Cincinnati | Free |
| July 8, 2025 | (Argentina) Hernán López | San Jose Earthquakes | (Argentina) Argentinos Juniors | Loan |
| July 9, 2025 | (Brazil) João Pedro | Charlotte FC | (Poland) Radomiak Radom | Transfer |
| July 9, 2025 | (Cape Verde) Iuri Tavares | Charlotte FC | (Croatia) Varaždin | Transfer |
| July 10, 2025 | (Norway) Heine Gikling Bruseth | San Diego FC | (Norway) Sarpsborg 08 | Loan |
| July 10, 2025 | (Colombia) Nelson Palacio | Real Salt Lake | (Switzerland) FC Zürich | Loan |
| July 11, 2025 | (Uruguay) Nicolás Lodeiro | Houston Dynamo FC | (Uruguay) Nacional | Free |
| July 11, 2025 | (Colombia) Edwin Mosquera | Atlanta United FC | (Colombia) Millonarios | Loan |
| July 11, 2025 | (United States) CJ Olney | Philadelphia Union | (United States) Lexington SC | Loan |
| July 12, 2025 | (Brazil) Léo Chú | FC Dallas | (Portugal) Alverca | Transfer |
| July 14, 2025 | (Norway) Birk Risa | New York City FC | (Norway) Molde | Transfer |
| July 15, 2025 | (United States) Patrick Agyemang | Charlotte FC | (England) Derby County | Transfer |
| July 16, 2025 | (Germany) Jasper Löffelsend | San Diego FC | (Poland) ŁKS Łódź | Free |
| July 18, 2025 | (South Africa) Njabulo Blom | St. Louis City SC | (Vietnam) Thep Xanh Nam Dinh | Transfer |
| July 18, 2025 | (United States) George Campbell | CF Montréal | (England) West Bromwich Albion | Transfer |
| July 18, 2025 | (Croatia) Damir Kreilach | Vancouver Whitecaps FC | (Croatia) HNK Rijeka | Free |
| July 18, 2025 | (Mexico) Jaziel Orozco | (United States) St. Louis City 2 | St. Louis City SC | Free |
| July 18, 2025 | (United States) Josh Torquato | (United States) North Texas SC | FC Dallas | Homegrown player |
| July 18, 2025 | (Ecuador) Pedro Vite | Vancouver Whitecaps FC | (Mexico) UNAM | Transfer |
| July 19, 2025 | (Italy) Federico Bernardeschi | Toronto FC | (Italy) Bologna | Free |
| July 23, 2025 | (Nigeria) Chidozie Awaziem | Colorado Rapids | (France) Nantes | Transfer |
| July 23, 2025 | (United States) Aziel Jackson | Columbus Crew | (Poland) Jagiellonia Białystok | Transfer |
| July 24, 2025 | (Sweden) Gustav Berggren | (Poland) Raków Częstochowa | New York Red Bulls | Transfer |
| July 24, 2025 | (Peru) Kenji Cabrera | (Peru) Melgar | Vancouver Whitecaps FC | Transfer |
| July 24, 2025 | (United States) Christian Cappis | (Norway) Viking | FC Dallas | Transfer |
| July 24, 2025 | (Haiti) Louicius Deedson | (Denmark) OB | FC Dallas | Transfer |
| July 24, 2025 | (Serbia) Mateja Đorđević | (Serbia) TSC | Austin FC | Transfer |
| July 24, 2025 | (Venezuela) Ender Echenique | (Venezuela) Caracas | FC Cincinnati | Transfer |
| July 24, 2025 | (Senegal) Fallou Fall | (Norway) Fredrikstad | St. Louis City SC | Transfer |
| July 24, 2025 | (Argentina) Nicolás Fernández | (Spain) Elche | New York City FC | Transfer |
| July 24, 2025 | (Chile) Thomas Gillier | (Italy) Bologna | CF Montréal | Loan |
| July 24, 2025 | (United States) Aiden Harangi | (Germany) Eintracht Frankfurt | San Diego FC | Loan |
| July 24, 2025 | (Bolivia) Efrain Morales | Atlanta United FC | CF Montréal | Trade |
| July 24, 2025 | (United States) Devin Padelford | Minnesota United FC | St. Louis City SC | Loan |
| July 24, 2025 | (France) Hugo Picard | (France) EA Guingamp | Columbus Crew | Transfer |
| July 24, 2025 | (South Korea) Jeong Sang-bin | Minnesota United FC | St. Louis City SC | Trade |
| July 24, 2025 | (United States) Samuel Sarver | (United States) North Texas SC | FC Dallas | Free |
| July 25, 2025 | (Spain) Juan Berrocal | (Spain) Getafe | Atlanta United FC | Loan |
| July 25, 2025 | (United States) Noah Cobb | Atlanta United FC | Colorado Rapids | Loan |
| July 25, 2025 | (Argentina) Rodrigo De Paul | (Spain) Atlético Madrid | Inter Miami CF | Loan |
| July 26, 2025 | (Palestine) Wessam Abou Ali | (Egypt) Al Ahly | Columbus Crew | Transfer |
| July 27, 2025 | (Brazil) Leo Afonso | Inter Miami CF | Atlanta United FC | Trade |
| July 28, 2025 | (Canada) Mathieu Choinière | (Switzerland) Grasshopper Club | Los Angeles FC | Loan |
| July 28, 2025 | (United States) Pedro Soma | (Spain) Cornellà | San Diego FC | Transfer |
| July 28, 2025 | (United States) David Vazquez | Philadelphia Union | San Diego FC | Loan |
| July 29, 2025 | (United States) Snyder Brunell | (United States) Tacoma Defiance | Seattle Sounders FC | Homegrown player |
| July 30, 2025 | (Brazil) Antônio Carlos | (Brazil) Fluminense | Houston Dynamo FC | Free |
| July 31, 2025 | (United States) Jacob Jackson | San Diego FC | FC Dallas | Trade |
| August 1, 2025 | (Algeria) Monsef Bakrar | New York City FC | (Croatia) Dinamo Zagreb | Transfer |
| August 1, 2025 | (Brazil) Rwan Cruz | (Brazil) Botafogo | Real Salt Lake | Loan |
| August 1, 2025 | (Mexico) Alan Montes | (Mexico) Necaxa | Sporting Kansas City | Loan |
| August 1, 2025 | (Trinidad and Tobago) Tyrese Spicer | Toronto FC | Orlando City SC | Trade |
| August 1, 2025 | (United States) Matt Turner | (France) Lyon | New England Revolution | Loan |
| August 2, 2025 | (Morocco) Ayoub Jabbari | (France) Grenoble | FC Cincinnati | Loan |
| August 3, 2025 | (England) Rob Holding | (England) Crystal Palace | Colorado Rapids | Transfer |
| August 4, 2025 | (Colombia) Steven Alzate | (England) Hull City | Atlanta United FC | Transfer |
| August 4, 2025 | (Scotland) Ryan Porteous | (England) Watford | Los Angeles FC | Transfer |
| August 5, 2025 | (United States) Milan Iloski | (Denmark) Nordsjælland | Philadelphia Union | Transfer |
| August 5, 2025 | (United States) Cooper Sanchez | (United States) Atlanta United 2 | Atlanta United FC | Homegrown player |
| August 5, 2025 | (United States) Nyk Sessock | (United States) Atlanta United 2 | Atlanta United FC | Free |
| August 5, 2025 | (England) Harry Toffolo | (England) Nottingham Forest | Charlotte FC | Transfer |
| August 6, 2025 | (United States) Corey Baird | FC Cincinnati | San Diego FC | Trade |
| August 6, 2025 | (Australia) Lachlan Brook | Real Salt Lake | (New Zealand) Auckland FC | Free |
| August 6, 2025 | (United States) Marco Farfan | FC Dallas | (Mexico) Tigres UANL | Transfer |
| August 6, 2025 | (Germany) Thomas Müller | (Germany) Bayern Munich | Vancouver Whitecaps FC | Free |
| August 6, 2025 | (Nigeria) Victor Olatunji | (Czech Republic) Sparta Prague | Real Salt Lake | Transfer |
| August 6, 2025 | (South Korea) Son Heung-min | (England) Tottenham Hotspur | Los Angeles FC | Transfer |
| August 7, 2025 | (Peru) Luis Abram | Atlanta United FC | (Peru) Sporting Cristal | Free |
| August 7, 2025 | (Guyana) Omari Glasgow | Chicago Fire FC | (United States) Loudoun United FC | Loan |
| August 7, 2025 | (Spain) Adrián Marín | (Portugal) Braga | Orlando City SC | Transfer |
| August 7, 2025 | (United States) Djordje Mihailovic | Colorado Rapids | Toronto FC | Trade |
| August 7, 2025 | (England) Ronaldo Vieira | (Italy) Sampdoria | San Jose Earthquakes | Transfer |
| August 8, 2025 | (Argentina) Luciano Acosta | FC Dallas | (Brazil) Fluminense | Transfer |
| August 8, 2025 | (Colombia) Alexis Manyoma | (Argentina) Estudiantes (LP) | Colorado Rapids | Loan |
| August 8, 2025 | (United States) Charlie Sharp | Toronto FC | (United States) Tampa Bay Rowdies | Loan |
| August 9, 2025 | (Canada) Malik Henry | (Canada) Toronto FC II | Toronto FC | Homegrown player |
| August 12, 2025 | (Colombia) Santiago Moreno | Portland Timbers | (Brazil) Fluminense | Transfer |
| August 13, 2025 | (Portugal) André Franco | (Portugal) Porto | Chicago Fire FC | Loan |
| August 13, 2025 | (Spain) Mario González | Los Angeles FC | (Spain) Burgos | Free |
| August 13, 2025 | (Australia) Archie Goodwin | (Australia) Adelaide United | Charlotte FC | Transfer |
| August 13, 2025 | (England) Matty Longstaff | Toronto FC | CF Montréal | Trade |
| August 13, 2025 | (Norway) Kristoffer Velde | (Greece) Olympiacos | Portland Timbers | Transfer |
| August 13, 2025 | (Canada) Jules-Anthony Vilsaint | CF Montréal | Toronto FC | Trade |
| August 14, 2025 | (Uruguay) Felipe Carballo | (Brazil) Grêmio | Portland Timbers | Loan |
| August 14, 2025 | (Poland) Mateusz Klich | Atlanta United FC | (Poland) Cracovia | Free |
| August 14, 2025 | (Argentina) Federico Redondo | Inter Miami CF | (Spain) Elche | Transfer |
| August 15, 2025 | (Brazil) Raul Gustavo | (Hungary) Ferencváros | New York City FC | Transfer |
| August 15, 2025 | (Brazil) Rafael Santos | Orlando City SC | Colorado Rapids | Trade |
| August 15, 2025 | (Republic of Ireland) Derrick Williams | Atlanta United FC | (England) Reading | Transfer |
| August 16, 2025 | (Canada) Emil Gazdov | CF Montréal | (Canada) Valour FC | Loan |
| August 19, 2025 | (United States) Drake Callender | Inter Miami CF | Charlotte FC | Trade |
| August 19, 2025 | (Ghana) Samuel Gidi | (Slovakia) MŠK Žilina | FC Cincinnati | Transfer |
| August 19, 2025 | (Canada) Liam Mackenzie | (Canada) Whitecaps FC 2 | Vancouver Whitecaps FC | Homegrown player |
| August 19, 2025 | (Costa Rica) Andy Rojas | (Costa Rica) Herediano | New York Red Bulls | Transfer |
| August 19, 2025 | (Paraguay) Matías Rojas | (Argentina) River Plate | Portland Timbers | Free |
| August 19, 2025 | (Portugal) Xande Silva | St. Louis City SC | (Israel) Hapoel Tel Aviv | Transfer |
| August 20, 2025 | (United States) Leo Duru | (England) Blackburn Rovers | San Diego FC | Loan |
| August 20, 2025 | (Honduras) Deybi Flores | Toronto FC | (Saudi Arabia) Al-Najma | Transfer |
| August 20, 2025 | (France) Adilson Malanda | Charlotte FC | (England) Middlesbrough | Transfer |
| August 20, 2025 | (France) Adilson Malanda | (England) Middlesbrough | Charlotte FC | Loan |
| August 20, 2025 | (Israel) Dor Turgeman | (Israel) Maccabi Tel Aviv | New England Revolution | Transfer |
| August 20, 2025 | (Canada) Joel Waterman | CF Montréal | Chicago Fire FC | Trade |
| August 21, 2025 | (United States) Paxten Aaronson | (Germany) Eintracht Frankfurt | Colorado Rapids | Transfer |
| August 21, 2025 | (Switzerland) Nicky Beloko | Austin FC | (Switzerland) Lausanne-Sport | Free |
| August 21, 2025 | (United States) Caden Clark | CF Montréal | D.C. United | Trade |
| August 21, 2025 | (Austria) Dominik Fitz | Austria Wien | Minnesota United FC | Transfer |
| August 21, 2025 | (Republic of Ireland) Andrew Moran | (England) Brighton & Hove Albion | Los Angeles FC | Loan |
| August 21, 2025 | (Mexico) Jonathan Pérez | LA Galaxy | Nashville SC | Trade |
| August 21, 2025 | (Belgium) Joedrick Pupe | (Belgium) FCV Dender | Vancouver Whitecaps FC | Transfer |
| August 21, 2025 | (Germany) Sebastian Schonlau | (Germany) Hamburger SV | Vancouver Whitecaps FC | Transfer |
| August 21, 2025 | (Norway) Bjørn Inge Utvik | Vancouver Whitecaps FC | (Norway) Sarpsborg 08 | Transfer |
| August 21, 2025 | (United States) DeAndre Yedlin | FC Cincinnati | Real Salt Lake | Trade |
| August 22, 2025 | (Nigeria) Michael Adedokun | CF Montréal | (United States) Lexington SC | Transfer |
| August 22, 2025 | (Brazil) Brenner | (Italy) Udinese | FC Cincinnati | Loan |
| August 22, 2025 | (Ecuador) José Cifuentes | (Scotland) Rangers | Toronto FC | Loan |
| August 22, 2025 | (Senegal) Mamadou Dieng | (United States) Hartford Athletic | Minnesota United FC | Transfer |
| August 22, 2025 | (Ecuador) Alexis Fariña | (Paraguay) Cerro Porteño | Minnesota United FC | Loan |
| August 22, 2025 | (United States) Bode Hidalgo | Real Salt Lake | CF Montréal | Trade |
| August 22, 2025 | (Spain) Iván Jaime | (Portugal) FC Porto | CF Montréal | Loan |
| August 22, 2025 | (United States) Kipp Keller | Minnesota United FC | (United States) New Mexico United | Loan |
| August 22, 2025 | (Poland) Dominik Marczuk | Real Salt Lake | FC Cincinnati | Loan |
| August 22, 2025 | (United States) John McCarthy | LA Galaxy | New York Red Bulls | Trade |
| August 22, 2025 | (Costa Rica) Kenyel Michel | (Costa Rica) Alajuelense | Minnesota United FC | Transfer |
| August 22, 2025 | (Costa Rica) Kenyel Michel | Minnesota United FC | (Costa Rica) Alajuelense | Loan |
| August 22, 2025 | (Norway) Amahl Pellegrino | San Jose Earthquakes | San Diego FC | Trade |
| August 22, 2025 | (Serbia) Viktor Radojević | (Serbia) FK TSC | Chicago Fire FC | Transfer |
| August 22, 2025 | (Jamaica) Tarik Scott | FC Dallas | (United States) Monterey Bay FC | Loan |
| August 22, 2025 | (Argentina) Mateo Silvetti | (Argentina) Newell's Old Boys | Inter Miami CF | Transfer |
| August 22, 2025 | (Greece) Nectarios Triantis | (England) Sunderland | Minnesota United FC | Transfer |
| August 23, 2025 | (United States) Kieran Chandler | (United States) Minnesota United FC 2 | Minnesota United FC | Free |
| August 23, 2025 | (Mali) Diadie Samassékou | (Germany) TSG Hoffenheim | Houston Dynamo FC | Free |
| August 25, 2025 | (Colombia) Carlos Terán | Chicago Fire FC | (Brazil) Athletico Paranaense | Transfer |
| August 26, 2025 | (Romania) Alexandru Băluță | (Romania) FCSB | Los Angeles FC | Free |
| August 29, 2025 | (France) Paul Marie | San Jose Earthquakes | (United States) Tampa Bay Rowdies | Loan |
| August 29, 2025 | (South Africa) Tsiki Ntsabeleng | FC Dallas | (South Africa) Mamelodi Sundowns | Loan |
| August 29, 2025 | (Canada) Tani Oluwaseyi | Minnesota United FC | (Spain) Villarreal | Transfer |
| August 29, 2025 | (United States) Jackson Travis | Colorado Rapids | (United States) Birmingham Legion | Loan |
| August 30, 2025 | (England) Toyosi Olusanya | Houston Dynamo FC | (England) Doncaster Rovers | Loan |
| September 2, 2025 | (United States) Benjamin Cremaschi | Inter Miami CF | (Italy) Parma | Loan |
| September 2, 2025 | (Brazil) Jailson | (Spain) Celta de Vigo | Los Angeles FC | Free |
| September 2, 2025 | (Jamaica) Damion Lowe | (Saudi Arabia) Al-Okhdood | Houston Dynamo FC | Free |
| September 2, 2025 | (Brazil) Sergio Santos | FC Cincinnati | Houston Dynamo FC | Waivers |
| September 3, 2025 | (Mali) Baye Coulibaly | (United States) Crown Legacy FC | Charlotte FC | Free |
| September 8, 2025 | (Argentina) Ramiro Enrique | Orlando City SC | (Saudi Arabia) Al-Kholood | Transfer |
| September 8, 2025 | (South Africa) Cassius Mailula | Toronto FC | (Belgium) K.V. Kortrijk | Loan |
| September 9, 2025 | (United States) Cody Baker | Seattle Sounders FC | (United States) Sacramento Republic FC | Loan |
| September 9, 2025 | (United States) Travian Sousa | Seattle Sounders FC | (United States) FC Tulsa | Loan |
| September 11, 2025 | (Canada) Jordan Knight | (United States) Huntsville City FC | Nashville SC | Free |
| September 12, 2025 | (Tunisia) Rayan Elloumi | (Canada) Whitecaps FC 2 | Vancouver Whitecaps FC | Homegrown player |
| September 12, 2025 | (Australia) Jake Girdwood-Reich | St. Louis City SC | (New Zealand) Auckland FC | Loan |
| September 12, 2025 | (United States) Mark O'Neill | (Canada) Whitecaps FC 2 | Vancouver Whitecaps FC | Free |
| October 16, 2025 | (United States) Oscar Avilez | (United States) D.C. United Academy | D.C. United | Homegrown player |
