= 2025 New England Revolution season =

New England Revolution 2025 soccer season

New England Revolution
2025 season
- President: Brian Bilello
- Head coach: Caleb Porter (until September 15); Pablo Moreira (interim, from September 15)
- Stadium: Gillette Stadium
- MLS: Conference: 11th Overall: 23rd
- MLS Cup playoffs: Did not qualify
- U.S. Open Cup: Round of 16
- Average home league attendance: 24,477
Home colors	Away colors	Third colors

The 2025 New England Revolution season was the club's 30th season in existence, and their 30th consecutive season playing in Major League Soccer, the top flight of American soccer. The season began on February 22 against Nashville SC. The Revolution also played in the U.S. Open Cup.

== Background ==
The 2024 season was the Revolution's 29th season of existence, and their 29th season in MLS, the top tier of American soccer. The season began on February 24 when the club began their play in the 2024 Major League Soccer season, and the season concluded on October 19. The Revolution finished the year 9–21–4 (31 points) leaving them 14th in the Eastern Conference, missing the playoffs. The Revolution did not participate in the 2024 U.S. Open Cup, but they participated in the 2024 CONCACAF Champions Cup and finished in the Quarterfinals, defeating Independiente and Alajuelense but losing to Club América.

== Club ==
=== Roster ===
Appearances and goals are career totals from prior MLS regular seasons.

Squad No.	Name	Nationality	Position(s)	Date of birth (age)	Signed from	Games played	Goals scored
Goalkeepers
24	Alex Bono	(United States)	GK	April 25, 1994 (aged 30)	(United States) D.C. United	169	0
31	Aljaž Ivačič	(Slovenia)	GK	December 29, 1993 (aged 31)	(United States) Portland Timbers	79	0
30	Matt Turner	(United States)	GK	December 29, 1994 (aged 30)	(United States) Olympique Lyonnais	201	0
33	Donovan Parisian	(United States) (Armenia)	GK	September 27, 2004 (aged 20)	(United States) University of San Diego	0	0
Defenders
2	Mamadou Fofana	(Mali)	DF	January 21, 1998 (aged 27)	(France) Amiens SC	0	0
3	Brayan Ceballos	(Colombia)	DF	May 24, 2001 (aged 23)	(Brazil) Fortaleza Esporte Clube	0	0
4	Tanner Beason	(United States)	DF	March 23, 1997 (aged 27)	(United States) San Jose Earthquakes	110	0
5	Keegan Hughes	(United States)	DF	July 22, 2000 (aged 24)	(United States) New England Revolution II	1	0
12	Ilay Feingold	(Israel) (Romania)	DF	August 23, 2004 (aged 20)	(Israel) Maccabi Haifa F.C.	0	0
15	Brandon Bye	(United States)	DF	November 29, 1995 (aged 29)	(United States) Western Michigan University	167	10
16	Wyatt Omsberg	(United States)	DF	September 21, 1995 (aged 29)	(United States) Chicago Fire FC	67	1
23	Will Sands	(United States)	DF	July 6, 2000 (aged 24)	(United States) Columbus Crew	30	0
25	Peyton Miller	(United States)	DF	November 8, 2007 (aged 17)	(United States) New England Revolution II	10	0
30	Damario McIntosh	(United States) (Jamaica)	DF	August 17, 2007 (aged 17)	(United States) New England Revolution II	0	0
88	Andrew Farrell	(United States)	DF	April 2, 1992 (aged 32)	(United States) University of Louisville	342	2
Midfielders
8	Matt Polster	(United States)	MF	June 8, 1993 (aged 31)	(Scotland) Rangers F.C.	217	9
10	Carles Gil	(Spain)	MF	November 22, 1992 (aged 32)	(Spain) Deportivo de La Coruña	159	39
14	Jackson Yueill	(United States)	MF	March 19, 1997 (aged 27)	(United States) San Jose Earthquakes	212	13
18	Allan Oyirwoth	(Uganda)	MF	January 23, 2007 (aged 18)	(Uganda) MYDA FC	0	0
22	Jack Panayotou	(United States) (Cyprus)	MF	June 5, 2004 (aged 20)	(United States) Georgetown University	17	0
29	Noel Buck	(England) (United States)	MF	April 5, 2005 (aged 19)	(United States) New England Revolution II	45	5
80	Alhassan Yusuf	(Nigeria)	MF	July 20, 2000 (aged 24)	(Belgium) Royal Antwerp F.C.	7	0
Forwards
7	Tomás Chancalay	(Argentina)	FW	January 1, 1999 (aged 26)	(Argentina) Racing Club	23	8
9	Leonardo Campana	(Ecuador) (United States)	FW	July 24, 2000 (aged 24)	(United States) Inter Miami CF	80	28
11	Luis Díaz	(United States)	FW	December 6, 1998 (aged 26)	(Costa Rica) Deportivo Saprissa	87	6
17	Ignatius Ganago	(Cameroon) (Nigeria)	FW	February 16, 1999 (aged 26)	(France) FC Nantes	0	0
32	Malcolm Fry	(United States)	FW	May 15, 2005 (aged 19)	(United States) New England Revolution II	2	0
37	Maximiliano Urruti	(Argentina)	FW	February 22, 1991 (aged 34)	Unattached (Note: Most recently played for Club Atlético Platense)	296	70
41	Luca Langoni	(Argentina)	FW	February 9, 2002 (aged 23)	(Argentina) Boca Juniors	11	3

== Non-competitive ==
In early January, the Revolution announced a series of six preseason games, with the first five being held at the IMG Academy in Bradenton, Florida.

=== Preseason exhibitions ===
January 21	Austin FC	0–1	New England Revolution	Bradenton, Florida
1:00 pm EST		Report	27' Omsberg	Stadium: IMG Academy

January 25	St. Louis City SC	0–1	New England Revolution	Bradenton, Florida
1:00 pm EST			18' Yusuf	Stadium: IMG Academy

February 3	Houston Dynamo	3–3	New England Revolution	Bradenton, Florida
11:00 am EST	Ponce 43', 58'; Dimareli 109'	Report	25' Campana; 48' Yusuf; 97' Dias	Stadium: IMG Academy
Note: The match was played over two 60-minute intervals.

February 8	Atlanta United	2–0	New England Revolution	Bradenton, Florida
1:00 pm EST	33' Thiaré; 56' Klich	Report		Stadium: IMG Academy

February 11	Tampa Bay Rowdies	0–1	New England Revolution	Bradenton, Florida
12:00 pm EST		Report	Panayotou 11'	Stadium: IMG Academy

February 15	New England Revolution	2–0	Hartford Athletic	Foxborough, Massachusetts
12:30 pm EST	Campana 40'; Urruti 87'			Stadium: Gillette Stadium

== Competitive ==
=== Major League Soccer ===
==== Results ====
February 24 1	Nashville SC	0–0	New England Revolution	Nashville, Tennessee
8:30 PM EST	Corcoran (yellow card) 64'	Report	Fofana (yellow card) 36'; Yueill (yellow card) 65'	Stadium: Geodis Park; Attendance: 23,494; Referee: Marcos de Oliveira

March 1 2	New England Revolution	0–1	Columbus Crew	Foxborough, Massachusetts
7:30 PM EST	Feingold (yellow card) 10'; Ganago (yellow card) 45+2'	Report	Russell-Rowe 51'; Arfsten (yellow card) 78'; Amundsen (yellow card) 87'; Zawadzki (yellow card) 90+5'	Stadium: Gillette Stadium; Attendance: 22,274; Referee: Filip Dujic

March 8 3	New England Revolution	0–2	Philadelphia Union	Foxborough, Massachusetts
7:30 PM EST	Langoni (yellow card) 52'; Ceballos (yellow card) 90+11'	Report	Gazdag (yellow card) 44'; Baribo 76', (yellow card) 78'; Makhanya (yellow card) 90+2'; Lukić 90+7'	Stadium: Gillette Stadium; Attendance: 15,596; Referee: Fotis Bazakos

March 15 4	New York City FC	2–1	New England Revolution	New York, New York
7:30 PM EDT	Fernández 38'; Shore (yellow card) 61'; Martínez 68'; Parks (yellow card) 90'	Report	Thiago 26' (o.g.); Feingold (yellow card) 90+4'	Stadium: Yankee Stadium; Attendance: 18,892; Referee: Malik Badawi

March 29 5	New England Revolution	2–1	New York Red Bulls	Foxborough, Massachusetts
2:30 PM EDT	Feingold (yellow card) 51'; Langoni (yellow card) 51'; Sands (yellow card) 75'; Gil 28', 90+7' (pen.)	Report	Choupo-Moting 45+2'; S. Nealis (yellow card) 49'; Eile (yellow card) 89'; Edwards (yellow card) 90+9'	Stadium: Gillette Stadium; Attendance: 20,439; Referee: Sergii Demianchuk

April 5 6	FC Cincinnati	1–0	New England Revolution	Cincinnati, Ohio
7:30 PM EDT	Denkey (yellow card) 14'; Orellano (yellow card) 39'; Santos 65'	Report	Polster (yellow card) 52'; Miller (yellow card) 83'	Stadium: TQL Stadium; Attendance: 22,912; Referee: Pierre-Luc Lauziere

April 12 7	Atlanta United FC	0–1	New England Revolution	Atlanta, Georgia
2:30 PM EDT	Klich (yellow card) 90+3'	Report	Gil 36' (pen.); Urruti (yellow card) 45+4'; Yusuf (yellow card) 77'	Stadium: Mercedes-Benz Stadium; Attendance: 41,879; Referee: Alexis Da Silva

April 19 8	New England Revolution	2–0	New York City FC	Foxborough, Massachusetts
7:30 PM EDT	Campana 43'; Ganago 48'; Polster (yellow card) 54'	Report	Gray (yellow card) 90+2'	Stadium: Gillette Stadium; Attendance: 21,081; Referee: Marcos de Oliveira

April 26 9	Charlotte FC	0–1	New England Revolution	Charlotte, North Carolina
7:30 PM EDT	Malanda (yellow card) 8'; Bronico (yellow card) 70'; Vargas (yellow card) 89'	Report	Ceballos (yellow card) 34'; Fofana (yellow card) 61'; Sands (yellow card) 76'; Gil 77'	Stadium: Bank of America Stadium; Attendance: 29,233; Referee: Victor Rivas

May 3 10	Toronto FC	0–2	New England Revolution	Toronto, Ontario
4:30 PM EDT		Report	Gil 11'; Campana (yellow card) 26', (goal) 27'	Stadium: BMO Field; Attendance: 19,690; Referee: Tori Penso

May 10 11	Orlando City SC	3–3	New England Revolution	Orlando, Florida
7:30 PM EDT	Ojeda 24', 33', 55' (pen.); Brekalo (yellow card) 76'; Araújo (yellow card) 77'; Gallese (yellow card) 80'; Thórhallsson (yellow card) 90+11'	Report	Yusuf 38'; Polster 44'; Gil 85' (pen.); Ivačič (yellow card) 90+1'	Stadium: Inter&Co Stadium; Attendance: 18,805; Referee: Rubiel Vazquez

May 17 12	New England Revolution	0–0	San Jose Earthquakes	Foxborough, Massachusetts
7:30 PM EDT	Ceballos (yellow card) 31'; Beason (yellow card) 65'	Report	Floriani (yellow card) 35'; Leroux (yellow card) 78'; Lima (yellow card) 82'	Stadium: Gillette Stadium; Attendance: 31,078; Referee: Ricardo Montero

May 24 13	Sporting Kansas City	3–3	New England Revolution	Kansas City, Kansas
8:30 PM EDT	Sallói 53'; Joveljić 59' (pen.); García 61', (yellow card) 68'; Bartlett (yellow card) 76'	Report	Chancalay 14'; Bartlett 23' (o.g.); Fofana (yellow card) 57'; Urruti 84'	Stadium: Children's Mercy Park; Attendance: 17,180; Referee: Sergii Boiko

May 28 14	D.C. United	1–1	New England Revolution	Washington, D.C.
7:30 PM EDT	Herrera (yellow card) 40'; Pirani 90+1'; Rowles (yellow card) 90+2'; Enow (yellow card) 90+3'	Report	Polster (yellow card) 23'; Feingold 45+3'; Fofana (yellow card) 84'	Stadium: Audi Field; Attendance: 10,645; Referee: Pierre-Luc Lauziere

May 31 15	CF Montréal	0–3	New England Revolution	Montreal, Quebec
7:30 PM EDT	Petrasso (yellow card) 15'; Vrioni (red card) 36'; Saliba (yellow card) 51'; Waterman (yellow card) 77'	Report	Yusuf (yellow card) 19'; Miller 48'; Feingold 55', 87'; Polster (yellow card) 59'	Stadium: Saputo Stadium; Attendance: 15,978; Referee: Michael Venne

June 14 16	New England Revolution	0–1	FC Cincinnati	Foxborough, Massachusetts
7:30 PM EDT	Ceballos (yellow card) 16'; Fofana (yellow card) 90+3'	Report	Denkey 26'; Kamara (yellow card) 40'; Orellano (yellow card) 52'; Yedlin (yellow card) 59'	Stadium: Gillette Stadium; Attendance: 27,184; Referee: Filip Dujic

June 25 17	New England Revolution	2–3	Nashville SC	Foxborough, Massachusetts
7:30 PM EDT	Chancalay 15'; Urruti (yellow card) 39'; Ceballos 49'; Yusuf (yellow card) 86'	Report	Muyl (yellow card) 21'; Surridge 45+2', 51', 58' (pen.); Tagseth (yellow card) 48'; Pérez (yellow card) 59'	Stadium: Gillette Stadium; Attendance: 16,354; Referee: Lorenzo Hernandez

June 28 18	New England Revolution	3–3	Colorado Rapids	Foxborough, Massachusetts
7:30 PM EDT	Hughes (yellow card) 7'; Vines 58' (o.g.); Gil (yellow card) 78', (goal) 86' (pen.); Urruti 90+3'	Report	Harris 29'; Navarro 40'; Ku-Dipietro 55'; Maxsø (yellow card) 79'; Cannon (yellow card) 90+4'	Stadium: Gillette Stadium; Attendance: 22,886; Referee: Natalie Simon

July 5 19	Portland Timbers	2–1	New England Revolution	Portland, Oregon
10:30 PM EDT	Smith 20'; da Costa 72'	Report	Langoni 35'	Stadium: Providence Park; Attendance: 22,776; Referee: Jon Freeman

July 9 20	New England Revolution	1–2	Inter Miami CF	Foxborough, Massachusetts
7:30 PM EDT	Gil 80'; Campana (yellow card) 51'	Report	Messi 27', 38'; Gallego (yellow card) 34'; Redondo (yellow card) 55'; Falcón (yellow card) 75'	Stadium: Gillette Stadium; Attendance: 43,293; Referee: Fotis Bakazos

July 12 21	Austin FC	0–0	New England Revolution	Austin, Texas
8:30 PM EDT	Pereira (yellow card) 45+1'	Report	Fofana (yellow card) 31'; Díaz Espinoza (yellow card) 86'; Campana (yellow card) 90+1'	Stadium: Q2 Stadium; Attendance: 20,738; Referee: Rosendo Mendoza

July 16 22	New York Red Bulls	5–3	New England Revolution	Harrison, New Jersey
7:30 PM EDT	Carmona (yellow card) 54'; Edelman 56'; Choupo-Moting 70', 83'; Forsberg 72', 88' (pen.); Eile (yellow card) 76'	Report	Campana 5', 90+3', (yellow card) 45+4'; Duncan 30' (o.g.); Ceballos (yellow card) 61'; Hughes (yellow card) 87'; Díaz Espinoza (yellow card) 90+5'	Stadium: Sports Illustrated Stadium; Attendance: 15,863; Referee: Sergii Boiko

July 19 23	New England Revolution	1–2	Orlando City SC	Foxborough, Massachusetts
7:30 PM EDT	Polster (yellow card) 30'; Chancalay 55'; Ceballos (yellow card) 67'	Report	Ojeda 18', 58'; Pašalić (yellow card) 55'; Gallese (yellow card) 66'	Stadium: Gillette Stadium; Attendance: 24,954; Referee: Lukasz Szpala

July 25 24	New England Revolution	1–3	CF Montréal	Foxborough, Massachusetts
7:30 PM EDT	Chancalay 3', (yellow card) 90+1'; Langoni (yellow card) 30'; Gil (yellow card) 73'; Polster (yellow card) 80'; Urruti (yellow card) 90+3'	Report	Owusu 9'; Sealy 36'; Waterman (yellow card) 73'; Escobar (yellow card) 88', (goal) 90+5'	Stadium: Gillette Stadium; Attendance: 17,992; Referee: Chris Penso

August 9 25	New England Revolution	2–0	D.C. United	Foxborough, Massachusetts
7:30 PM EDT	Fofana (yellow card) 59'; Campana 62', (yellow card) 76'; Gil 70'	Report	Benteke (yellow card) 11'; Enow (yellow card) 22'	Stadium: Gillette Stadium; Attendance: 21,538; Referee: Drew Fischer

August 16 26	New England Revolution	0–2	Los Angeles FC	Foxborough, Massachusetts
7:30 PM EDT	Fofana (yellow card) 88'	Report	Delgado 51'; Jesus (yellow card) 87'; Choinière 90+4'	Stadium: Gillette Stadium; Attendance: 27,043; Referee: Marcos de Oliveira

August 23 27	Columbus Crew	1–2	New England Revolution	Columbus, Ohio
7:30 PM EDT	Gazdag 71'; Moreira (yellow card) 84'	Report	Campana 25'; Polster (yellow card) 45+2'; Gil (yellow card) 47'; Ganago 39'	Stadium: Lower.com Field; Attendance: 20,777; Referee: Sergii Demianchuk

August 30 28	New England Revolution	1–2	Charlotte FC	Foxborough, Massachusetts
7:30 PM EDT	Ganago 24'; Chancalay (yellow card) 90+3'	Report	Bronico 12', (yellow card) 48'; Westwood (yellow card) 30'; Williamson (yellow card) 44'; Zaha (yellow card) 45+5'; Toklomati (yellow card) 61', (goal) 87'	Stadium: Gillette Stadium; Attendance: 19,782; Referee: Rosendo Mendoza

September 6 29	Chicago Fire FC	3–2	New England Revolution	Bridgeview, Illinois
8:30 PM EDT	Bamba 2'; Zinckernagel 10'; Cuypers 68'; Brady (yellow card) 72'; Gonzalez (yellow card) 90+3'	Report	Miller 78'; Ceballos (yellow card) 81'; Gil 90+4' (pen.)	Stadium: SeatGeek Stadium; Attendance: 16,947; Referee: Guido Gonzales Jr.

September 13 30	New England Revolution	1–1	Toronto FC	Foxborough, Massachusetts
7:30 PM EDT	Oyirwoth (yellow card) 38'; Chancalay (yellow card) 42'; Fofana (yellow card) 67'; Langoni 90'; Yusuf (yellow card) 90+6'	Report	Franklin (yellow card) 19'; Corbeanu 75'; Dominguez (yellow card) 76'; Laryea (yellow card) 80'	Stadium: Gillette Stadium; Attendance: 22,391; Referee: Alexis Da Silva

September 20 31	Philadelphia Union	1–0	New England Revolution	Chester, Pennsylvania
2:30 PM EDT	Damiani 70'; Baribo (yellow card) 77'	Report	Oyirwoth (yellow card) 22'; Miller (red card) 75'; Yusuf (yellow card) 62'; Chancalay (yellow card) 90+5'	Stadium: Subaru Park; Attendance: 18,920; Referee: Lorenzo Hernandez

September 27 32	New England Revolution	2–0	Atlanta United FC	Foxborough, Massachusetts
7:30 PM EDT	Ceballos (yellow card) 10'; Oyirwoth (yellow card) 46'; Sands (yellow card) 70'; Turgeman 72'; Campana 75'	Report	Gregersen (yellow card) 50'; Amador (yellow card) 78'	Stadium: Gillette Stadium; Attendance: 25,790; Referee: Nabil Bensalah

October 4 33	Inter Miami CF	4–1	New England Revolution	Fort Lauderdale, Florida
7:30 PM EDT	Allende 32', 60'; Alba 45+3', 63'; De Paul (yellow card) 86'; Falcón (yellow card) 88'	Report	Ceballos (yellow card) 29'; Turgeman 59'	Stadium: Chase Stadium; Referee: Ismail Elfath

October 18 34	New England Revolution	2–2	Chicago Fire FC	Foxborough, Massachusetts
6:00 PM EDT	Yusuf 1'; Turgeman (yellow card) 68', (goal) 97'; Langoni (yellow card) 90+9'	Report	Zinckernagel 7'; Turgeman 90+9' (o.g.); Elliott (yellow card) 90+12'	Stadium: Gillette Stadium; Referee: Pierre-Luc Lauziere

=== U.S. Open Cup ===
On January 28, US Soccer announced that the Revolution would enter the 2025 U.S. Open Cup in the Round of 32, along with 15 other MLS teams. The team were not seeded as hosts for the match.

May 7 Round of 32	Rhode Island FC	1–2	(Massachusetts) New England Revolution	Pawtucket, Rhode Island
7:30 PM EDT	Nodarse (yellow card) 8'; Holstad (yellow card) 45+2'; Rodriguez 50'	Report	Oyirwoth (yellow card) 32'; Chancalay 38'; Oliveira 88'; Klein (yellow card) 90+4'	Stadium: Centreville Bank Stadium; Attendance: 9,539; Referee: Calin Radosav

May 20 Round of 16	New England Revolution (Massachusetts)	1–3	(Illinois) Chicago Fire FC	Providence, Rhode Island
7:30 PM EDT	Omsberg (yellow card) 67'; Reynolds 89' (o.g.); Klein (yellow card) 90+4'	Report	D'Avilla (yellow card) 9'; Klein 39' (o.g.); Cuypers 69'; Glasgow (yellow card) 76'; Zinckernagel 79'	Stadium: Chapey Field at Anderson Stadium; Referee: Greg Dopka

=== Leagues Cup ===
New England Revolution did not qualify for the 2025 Leagues Cup as they were not one of the top 9 teams in the Eastern Conference.

== Transfers ==
=== Transfers in ===
Date	Position	No.	Name	From	Fee/notes	Ref.
December 3	DF	–	(Mali) Mamadou Fofana	(France) Amiens SC	Transfer	
December 13	DF	–	(Colombia) Brayan Ceballos	(Brazil) Fortaleza Esporte Clube	Transfer	
December 18	MD	14	(United States) Jackson Yueill	(United States) San Jose Earthquakes	Free Agent	
December 19	FW	17	(Ecuador) Leonardo Campana	(United States) Inter Miami CF	Trade	
December 20	GK	–	(United States) Alex Bono	(United States) DC United	Free Agent	
December 20	DF	–	(United States) Tanner Beason	(United States) San Jose Earthquakes	Free Agent	
January 2	MF	–	(Costa Rica) Luis Díaz	(Costa Rica) Deportivo Saprissa	Free Transfer	
January 3	GK	–	(United States) Donovan Parisian	SuperDraft	–	
January 8	MF	–	(Uganda) Allan Oyirwoth	–	Free Transfer	
January 10	FW	–	(Cameroon) Ignatius Ganago	(France) FC Nantes	Loan	
January 14	DF	–	(United States) Wyatt Omsberg	(United States) Chicago Fire FC	Free Agent	
January 16	FW	–	(Argentina) Maximiliano Urruti	(Argentina) Platense	Free Agent	
January 22	DF	–	(United States) (Jamaica) Damario McIntosh	(United States) New England Revolution II	Home Grown	
January 28	DF	–	(Israel) (Romania) Ilay Feingold	(Israel) Maccabi Haifa	Transfer	

=== Transfers out ===
Date	Position	No.	Name	To	Fee/notes	Ref.
November 25	DF	–	(Ecuador) Xavier Arreaga	(Ecuador) Barcelona S.C.	Declined Option	
November 25	FW	–	(Ghana) Joshua Bolma	(United States) Houston Dynamo 2	Declined Option	
November 25	FW	–	(Colombia) Dylan Borrero	(Brazil) Fortaleza	Declined Option	
November 25	MF	–	(Spain) Nacho Gil	(Greece) Volos	Declined Option	
November 25	MF	–	(United States) Tommy McNamara	–	Declined Option	
November 25	DF	–	(Ghana) Jonathan Mensah	–	Declined Option	
November 25	DF	–	(United States) Nick Lima	(United States) San Jose Earthquakes	Out of Contract	
November 25	DF	–	(United States) Tim Parker	(United States) New York Red Bulls	Out of Contract	
November 25	FW	–	(Costa Rica) Damian Rivera	(United States) Phoenix Rising FC	Out of Contract	
November 25	DF	–	(United States) Ryan Spaulding	(United States) Sacramento Republic FC	Out of Contract	
November 25	FW	–	(United States) Bobby Wood	–	Out of Contract	
December 9	DF	–	(United States) Dave Romney	(United States) San Jose Earthquakes	Trade	
December 9	MF	–	(Canada) Mark-Anthony Kaye	(United States) San Jose Earthquakes	Trade	
December 9	MF	–	(United States) Ian Harkes	(United States) San Jose Earthquakes	Trade	
December 30	GK	–	(United States) Earl Edwards Jr.	(United States) San Jose Earthquakes	Trade	
January 2	MF	–	(Bosnia and Herzegovina) Esmir Bajraktarević	(Netherlands) PSV Eindhoven	Transfer	
January 6	MF	–	(Ghana) Emmanuel Boateng	(United States) San Diego FC	Trade	
January 7	FW	–	(Albania) Giacomo Vrioni	(Canada) CF Montréal	Trade	

=== MLS SuperDraft picks ===
2025 New England Revolution SuperDraft Picks
Round	Selection	Player	Position	College	Status
1	18	Donovan Parisian	GK	University of San Diego	Trade from HOU
2	35	Eric Howard	DF	Georgetown	
3	65	C.J. Williams	DF	Boston College	

== See also ==
- 2025 New England Revolution II season
