= Ivačič =

Ivačič is a Slovene surname. Notable people with the surname include:

- Aljaž Ivačič (born 1993), Slovene footballer
- Matic Ivačič (born 1993), Slovene motorcycle speedway rider
