= Ilay Feingold =

Israeli footballer (born 2004)

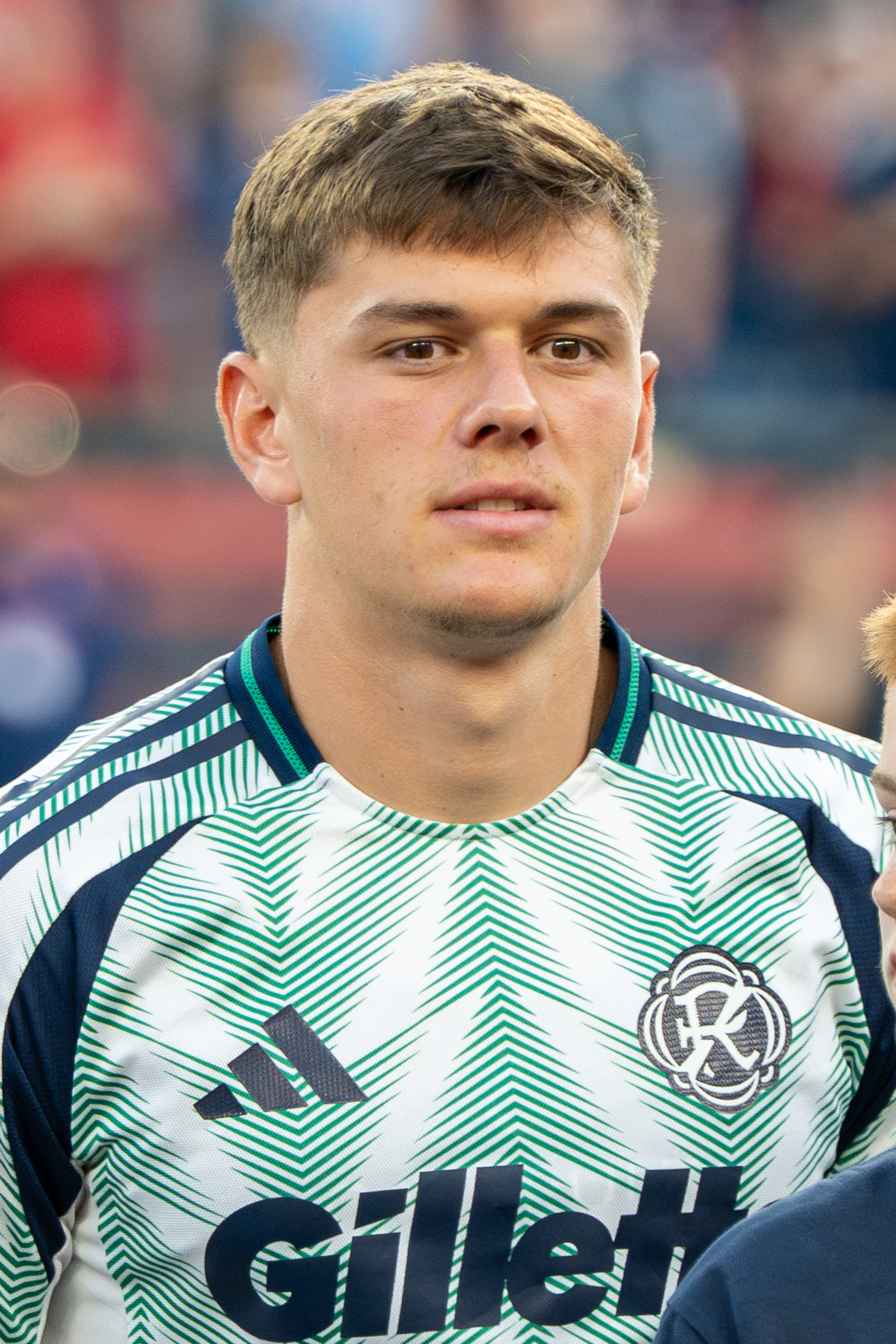
- Feingold with the New England Revolution in 2025

Personal information
- Date of birth: 23 August 2004 (age 22)
- Place of birth: Netanya, Israel
- Height: 1.78 m (5 ft 10 in)
- Positions: Right-back; centre-back

Team information
- Current team: New England Revolution
- Number: 12

Youth career
- 2011–2019: Maccabi Netanya
- 2019–2020: Hapoel Ra'anana
- 2020–2023: Maccabi Haifa

Senior career*
Years	Team	Apps	(Gls)
2023–2025	Maccabi Haifa	37	(0)
2025–	New England Revolution	33	(4)

International career^{‡}
2019	Israel U16	3	(0)
2021	Israel U18	3	(0)
2022–2023	Israel U19	21	(1)
2023	Israel U20	7	(0)
2023	Israel U21	1	(0)
2024	Israel Olympic	3	(0)
2024–	Israel	5	(0)
Medal record
Representing Israel U-19
UEFA European Under-19 Championship
Runner-up	2022 Slovakia	Team
Representing Israel U-20
FIFA U-20 World Cup
Third place	2023 Argentina	Team
- * Club domestic league appearances and goals as of 20 March 2026 ‡ National team caps and goals as of 20:20, 4 October 2026 (UTC)

Ilay Feingold (also spelled Faingold, Hebrew: עיליי פיינגולד; born 23 August 2004) is an Israeli professional footballer who plays as a right-back or centre-back for the Major League Soccer club New England Revolution and the Israel national team.

== Early and personal life ==
Feingold was born and raised in Netanya, Israel, to an Israeli family of Ashkenazi Jewish (Romanian-Jewish) descent. His father Avi Feingold is an electrician.

He also holds a Romanian passport on account of his Ashkenazi Jewish ancestry, which eases the move to certain European football leagues.

== Club career ==
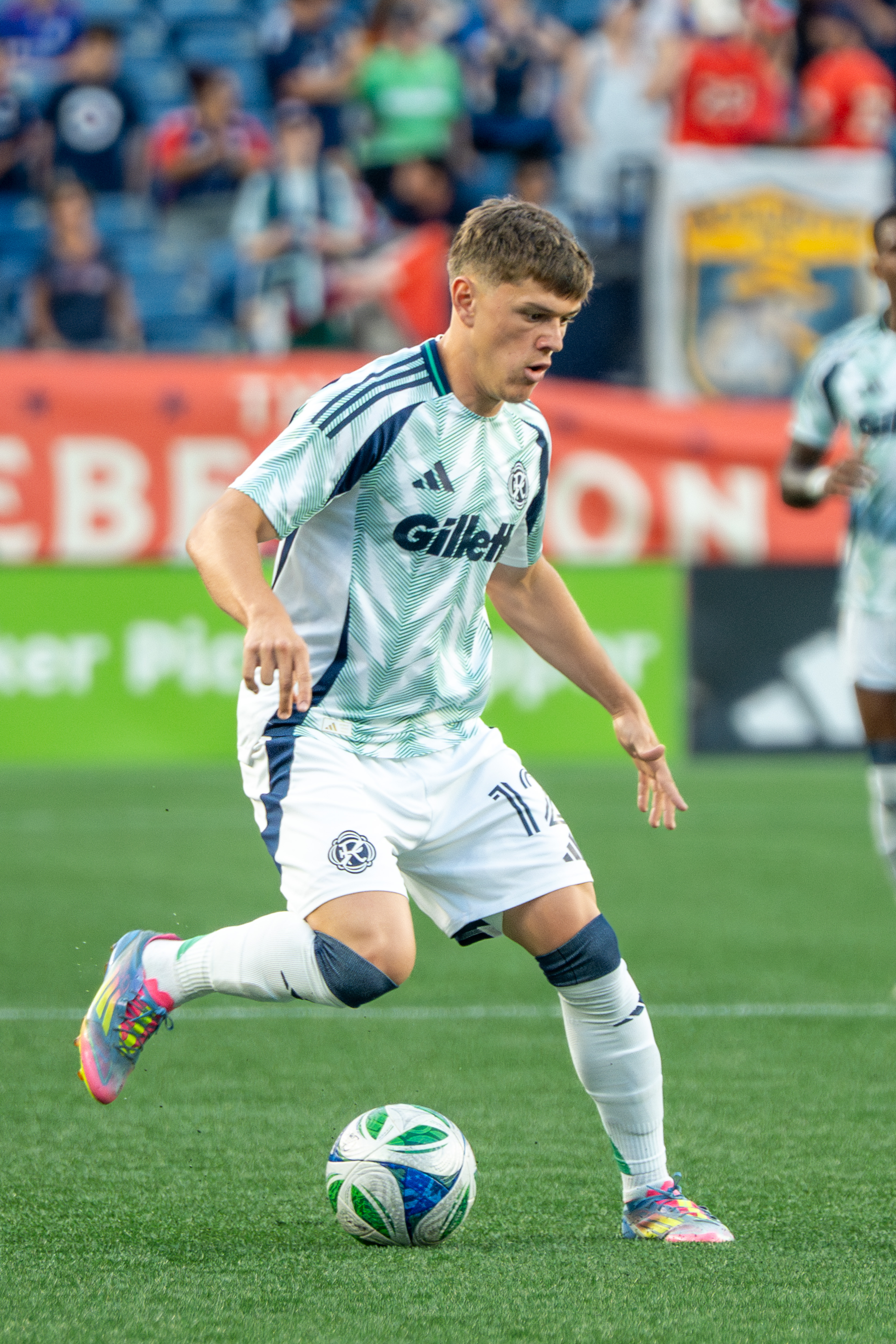
Ilay Feingold during NE Revolution vs Nashville SC in 2025

=== Maccabi Haifa ===
On 6 December 2023, Feingold made his senior debut for Israeli Premier League champions Maccabi Haifa in the 2023–24 UEFA Europa League group stage, that ended in an away 0–0 draw against Spanish side Villarreal. On 17 December, he made his senior Israeli Premier League debut for Maccabi Haifa, as well as part of the opening line-up (XI), at the prominent Haifa derby that ended in a 3–0 league victory for Feingold's club over its city rival Hapoel Haifa.

=== New England Revolution ===
On 28 January 2025, Feingold signed with the New England Revolution on a u22 initiative contract. The transfer fee was undisclosed. The contract ran through the 2027 season with a club option for 2028. Feingold made his MLS debut, and recorded his first start for the Revolution, in the 2025 season opener, a 0–0 draw against Nashville SC on 22 February. He scored his first Revolution goal on 28 May in a 1–1 draw with D.C. United. He subsequently received MLS Team of the Matchday honors for his performance.

== International career ==
Feingold has played for Israel U19, where he had a crucial role as part the opening line-up in the 2022 UEFA European Under-19 Championship which took place in Slovakia, and helped his native Israel to earn 2nd place (runner-ups) in the finals; just behind eventual champions England U19.

Feingold also played at the subsequent Israel U20, providing yet another essential involvement of his, 2023 FIFA U-20 World Cup which took place in Argentina; where Israel finiished in 3rd place (bronze medals).

In 2023, he played for Israel U21

He was named to Israel's squad for the 2024 Olympic Games, where he played in all of Israel's three games against Mali, Paraguay and Japan.

On 10 October 2024, he got his first senior cap during an UEFA Nations League game against France.

== Career statistics ==
=== Club ===
As of match played 3 March 2024

Club	Season	League			State Cup		Toto Cup		Continental (Europe)		Other		Total	
Club	Season	Division	Apps	Goals	Apps	Goals	Apps	Goals	Apps	Goals	Apps	Goals	Apps	Goals
Maccabi Haifa	2023–24	Israeli Premier League	21	0	3	0	1	0	6	0	0	0	31	0
Career total			21	0	3	0	1	0	6	0	0	0	31	0

=== International ===
As of match played 4 October 2026

Appearances and goals by national team and year
National team	Year	Apps	Goals
Israel	2024	2	0
Israel	2026	3	0
Israel	Total	5	0

== See also ==
- List of Jewish footballers
- List of Jews in sports
- List of Israelis
- List of Israel international footballers
