= Aljaž Ivačič =

Slovenian footballer (born 1993)

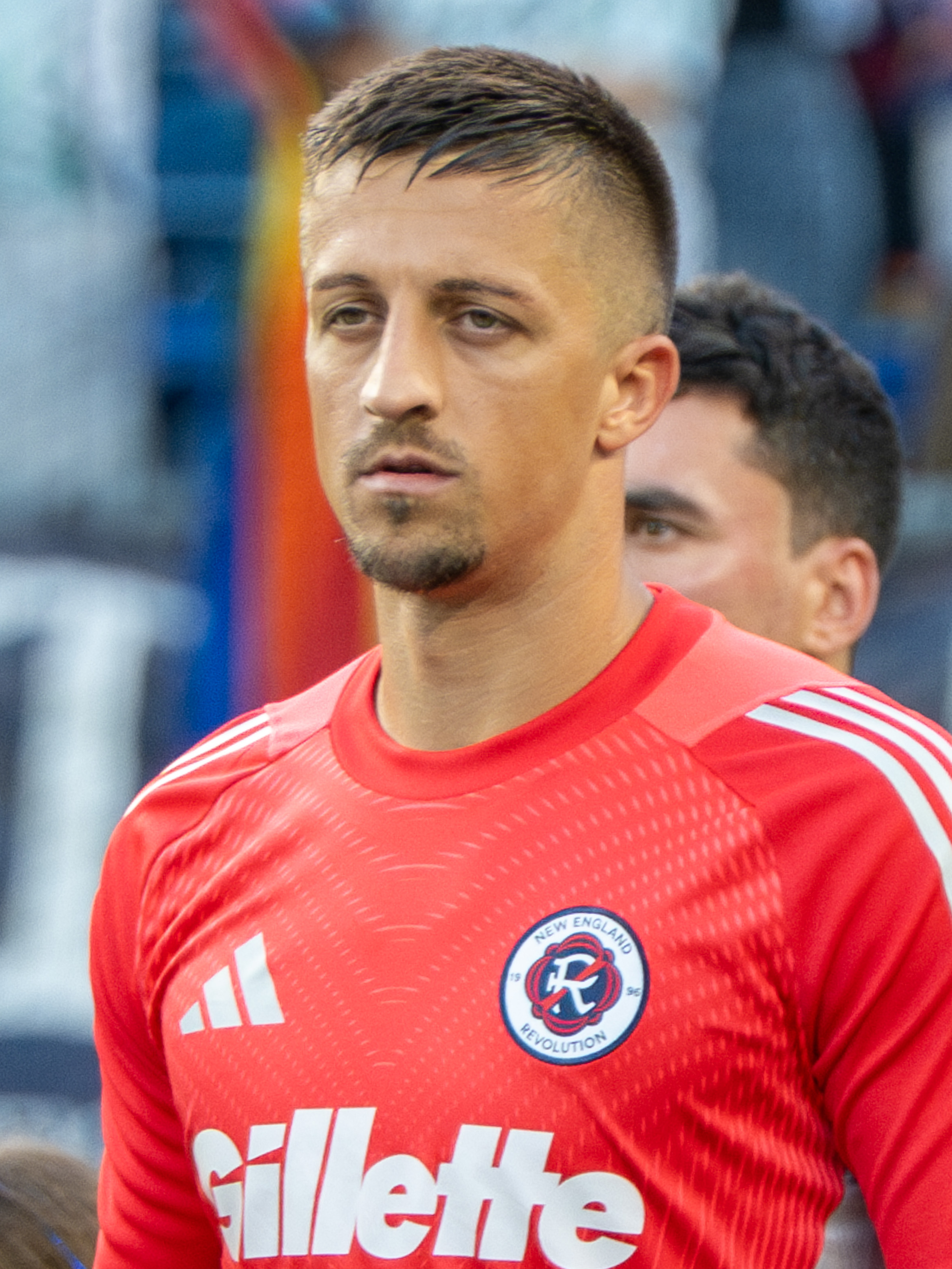
- Ivačič with the New England Revolution in 2025

Personal information
- Date of birth: 29 December 1993 (age 32)
- Place of birth: Ljubljana, Slovenia
- Height: 1.88 m (6 ft 2 in)
- Position: Goalkeeper

Team information
- Current team: DAC Dunajská Streda
- Number: 31

Youth career
- 2003–2011: Domžale
- 2012: Olimpija Ljubljana

Senior career*
Years	Team	Apps	(Gls)
2012–2016	Olimpija Ljubljana	2	(0)
2012–2013	→ Rudar Trbovlje (loan)	22	(0)
2013	→ Bela Krajina (loan)	9	(0)
2015–2016	→ Radomlje (loan)	20	(0)
2016–2017	Radomlje	35	(0)
2017	Pafos	0	(0)
2017–2019	Olimpija Ljubljana	43	(0)
2019–2024	Portland Timbers	54	(0)
2019	Portland Timbers 2	12	(0)
2024–2025	New England Revolution	49	(0)
2026–	DAC Dunajská Streda	0	(0)

International career
2013	Slovenia U20	1	(0)
- * Club domestic league appearances and goals as of 22 February 2026

Aljaž Ivačič (born 29 December 1993) is a Slovenian professional footballer who plays as a goalkeeper for Slovak First Football League club DAC Dunajská Streda.

== Club career ==
Ivačič was signed by Portland Timbers on 18 January 2019. He made his debut for the club in a 6–1 victory over the San Jose Earthquakes on 19 September 2020, earning three saves and giving up one goal. On 25 September 2023, Ivačič filed a complaint with the MLS Players Association against the Timbers alleging abusive conduct and tampering. A few days later, Major League Soccer announced it was suspending Ivačič for three matches and fining him an undisclosed amount for using threatening language toward team staff. Ivačič left the team in March 2024 after his contract was waived.

On 23 April 2024, the New England Revolution announced they had signed Ivačič through the 2025 season. He was named MLS Player of the Matchday for week 19, following the Revolution's 1–0 victory over the New York Red Bulls in which he made five saves. He became the first goalkeeper to win Player of the Matchday award since Dayne St. Clair in 2022, and the second Revolution keeper to win the award, following Matt Turner in 2021.

During the 2025 New England Revolution season, Ivačič was named in MLS Team of the Matchday for weeks 8 and 10, posting shut-outs against Atlanta United FC and Charlotte FC. However, he was waived by the Revolution on 11 September 2025.

== International career ==
Ivačič made one appearance for the Slovenia under-20 national team in April 2013, in a 4–1 loss to Croatia. In June 2023, he was called up to the Slovenia senior team by manager Matjaž Kek as a third-choice goalkeeper for the UEFA Euro 2024 qualifying matches against Finland and Denmark.

== Career statistics ==
As of match played 20 October 2024

Appearances and goals by club, season and competition
Club	Season	League			National cup		Continental		Other		Total	
Club	Season	Division	Apps	Goals	Apps	Goals	Apps	Goals	Apps	Goals	Apps	Goals
Olimpija Ljubljana	2012–13	1. SNL	0	0	0	0	0	0	—		0	0
Olimpija Ljubljana	2013–14	1. SNL	0	0	0	0	0	0	—		0	0
Olimpija Ljubljana	2014–15	1. SNL	2	0	0	0	—		—		2	0
Olimpija Ljubljana	2015–16	1. SNL	0	0	0	0	—		—		0	0
Olimpija Ljubljana	Total		2	0	0	0	0	0	—		2	0
Rudar Trbovlje (loan)	2012–13	3. SNL	22	0	—		—		—		22	0
Bela Krajina (loan)	2013–14	2. SNL	9	0	—		—		—		9	0
Radomlje (loan)	2014–15	1. SNL	2	0	—		—		—		2	0
Radomlje (loan)	2015–16	2. SNL	18	0	—		—		—		18	0
Radomlje (loan)	Total		20	0	0	0	0	0	—		20	0
Radomlje	2016–17	1. SNL	35	0	2	0	—		—		37	0
Olimpija Ljubljana	2017–18	1. SNL	25	0	6	0	—		—		31	0
Olimpija Ljubljana	2018–19	1. SNL	18	0	0	0	7 (Note: Two appearances in UEFA Champions League, five appearances in UEFA Europa League)	0	—		25	0
Olimpija Ljubljana	Total		43	0	6	0	7	0	—		56	0
Portland Timbers	2019	Major League Soccer	0	0	0	0	—		0	0	0	0
Portland Timbers	2020	Major League Soccer	2	0	—		—		0	0	2	0
Portland Timbers	2021	Major League Soccer	5	0	—		0	0	0	0	5	0
Portland Timbers	2022	Major League Soccer	32	0	0	0	—		—		32	0
Portland Timbers	2023	Major League Soccer	15	0	0	0	—		2	0	17	0
Portland Timbers	Total		54	0	0	0	0	0	2	0	56	0
Portland Timbers 2	2019	USL Championship	12	0	—		—		—		12	0
New England Revolution	2024	Major League Soccer	25	0	—		—		3	0	28	0
Career total			222	0	8	0	7	0	5	0	242	0
