= Brayan Ceballos =

Colombian footballer (born 2001)

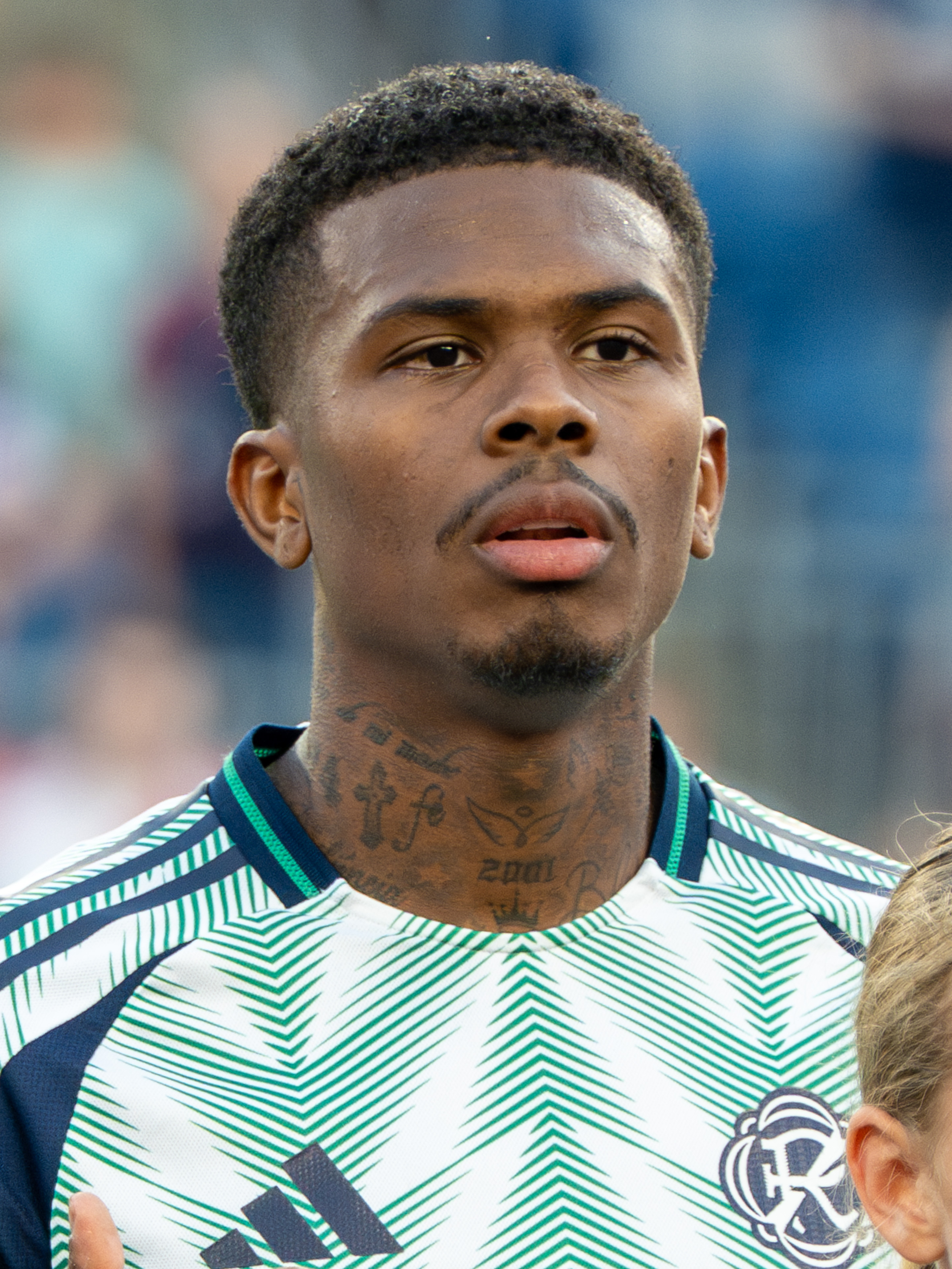
- Ceballos with the New England Revolution in 2025

Personal information
- Full name: Brayan Andrés Ceballos Jiménez
- Date of birth: 24 May 2001 (age 25)
- Place of birth: Cali, Colombia
- Height: 1.83 m (6 ft 0 in)
- Position: Centre back

Team information
- Current team: CF Montréal
- Number: 3

Youth career
- Universitario Popayán

Senior career*
Years	Team	Apps	(Gls)
2018	Universitario Popayán	5	(0)
2019–2021	Deportes Quindío	38	(1)
2022–2024	Fortaleza	47	(0)
2023–2024	→ Junior (loan)	16	(1)
2024	→ Dynamo Kyiv (loan)	3	(1)
2025–2026	New England Revolution	38	(3)
2026–	CF Montréal	0	(0)
- * Club domestic league appearances and goals as of 24 July 2026

Brayan Andrés Ceballos Jiménez (born 24 May 2001) is a Colombian footballer who plays as central defender for Major League Soccer club CF Montréal. He previously played for the New England Revolution.

== Club career ==
=== Early career ===
Born in Cali, Ceballos is an Universitario Popayán youth graduate, and made his senior debut on 11 April 2018, starting in a 1–0 away win over Deportes Quindío, for the year's Copa Colombia. After five more Categoría Primera B appearances, he moved to the latter club, owned by the same group of businessmen.

Initially a backup option, Ceballos became a regular starter for the club in the 2021 season, helping in their promotion to the Categoría Primera A in the Torneo I. He made his top tier debut on 17 July 2021, playing the full 90 minutes in a 2–0 home success over Jaguares de Córdoba.

Ceballos scored his first senior goal on 17 August 2021, netting the opener in a 2–3 home loss against Atlético Bucaramanga. He featured in 11 matches in the main category, as his side was immediately relegated back.

=== Fortaleza ===
On 16 December 2021, Ceballos moved abroad and signed a three-year contract with Campeonato Brasileiro Série A side Fortaleza.

=== New England Revolution ===
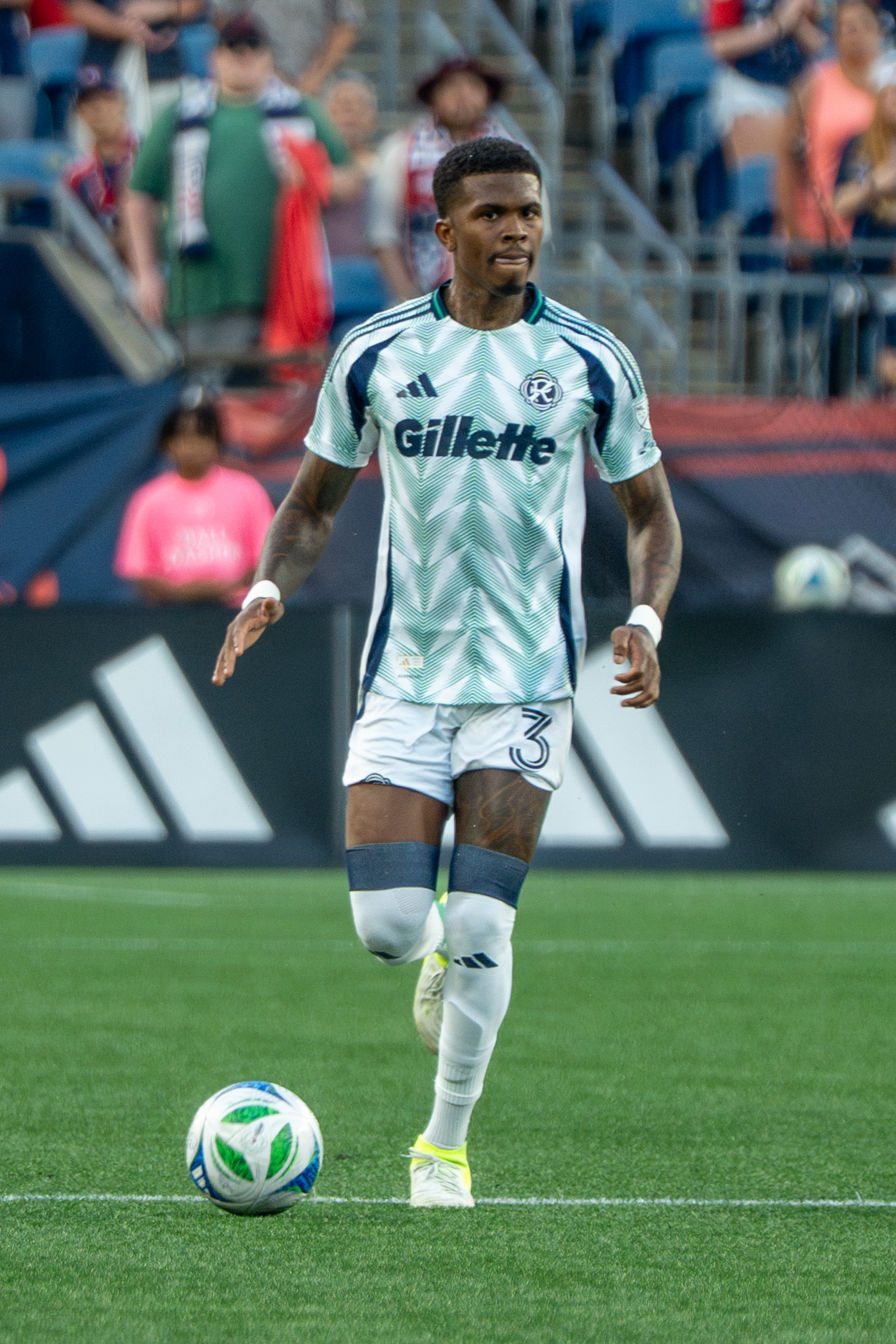
Brayan Ceballos with New England in 2025

On 13 December 2024, Ceballos signed with Major League Soccer club New England Revolution. Ceballos made his MLS debut, and recorded his first start for the Revolution, in the 2025 season opener, a 0–0 draw against Nashville SC on 22 February. He received MLS team of the matchday honors for week 1. Ceballos was the Revolution's Defender of the Year in 2025.

=== CF Montréal ===
On 24 July 2026, Ceballos was acquired by fellow MLS squad CF Montréal for up to $850,000 in General Allocation Money.

== Career statistics ==
As of 29 December 2022

Club	Season	League			Cup		Continental		Other		Total	
Club	Season	Division	Apps	Goals	Apps	Goals	Apps	Goals	Apps	Goals	Apps	Goals
Universitario Popayán	2018	Categoría Primera B	5	0	1	0	—		—		6	0
Deportes Quindío	2019	Categoría Primera B	1	0	3	0	—		—		4	0
Deportes Quindío	2020	Categoría Primera B	7	0	4	0	—		—		11	0
Deportes Quindío	2021	Categoría Primera B	19	0	0	0	—		—		19	0
Deportes Quindío	2021	Categoría Primera A	11	1	0	0	—		—		11	1
Deportes Quindío	Total		38	1	7	0	—		—		45	1
Fortaleza	2022	Série A	16	0	5	0	0	0	6 (Note: One appearance in Campeonato Cearense, five appearances in Copa do Nordeste.)	0	27	0
Career total			59	1	13	0	0	0	6	0	78	1

== Honours ==
Fortaleza

- Copa do Nordeste: 2022
- Campeonato Cearense: 2022, 2023

Atlético Junior

- Categoría Primera A: 2023-II
