= MYDA FC =

Ugandan football club

- Full name: Malaba Youth Development Association Football Club
- Nickname: The Flying Eagles
- Founded: 2009
- Ground: King George Park, Tororo
- Website: http://www.mydafc.com

MYDA FC is an association football club from Malaba, near Tororo in the Eastern Region, Uganda.

The team won promotion to the Uganda Premier League for the 2020-21 Uganda Premier League season.
