= All-time CF Montréal roster =

This list comprises all players who have signed with the CF Montréal since the team's first Major League Soccer season in 2012 during league calendar.

== List of players ==
Competitive matches only. Players in bold are now on the team roster. Stats and roster are accurate as of November 3, 2026

Player		Total			MLS			MLS Playoffs			Canadian Championship			CONCACAF Champions League			Leagues Cup			Other Official Tournaments		
Name	Nation	Apps	Goals	Assist	Apps	Goals	Assist	Apps	Goals	Assist	Apps	Goals	Assist	Apps	Goals	Assist	Apps	Goals	Assist	Apps	Goals	Assist
Eric Alexander	(United States)	37	0	1	32	0	1	0	0	0	5	0	0	0	0	0	0	0	0	0	0	0
Fernando Álvarez	(Colombia)	63	1	2	53	1	2	1	0	0	3	0	0	0	0	0	5	0	0	0	0	0
Quincy Amarikwa	(United States)	10	1	0	10	1	0	0	0	0	0	0	0	0	0	0	0	0	0	0	0	0
Frankie Amaya	(United States)	6	1	0	3	0	0	0	0	0	3	1	0	0	0	0	0	0	0	0	0	0
Davy Arnaud (Note: Team captain)	(United States)	62	5	8	57	5	8	0	0	0	3	0	0	2	0	0	0	0	0	0	0	0
Adrián Arregui	(Argentina)	8	0	1	6	0	1	0	0	0	2	0	0	0	0	0	0	0	0	0	0	0
Jean-Aniel Assi (Note: Homegrown player)	(Canada)	1	0	0	0	0	0	0	0	0	0	0	0	1	0	0	0	0	0	0	0	0
Tomás Avilés	(Argentina)	4	0	0	4	0	0	0	0	0	0	0	0	0	0	0	0	0	0	0	0	0
Micheal Azira	(Uganda)	30	1	1	29	1	1	0	0	0	1	0	0	0	0	0	0	0	0	0	0	0
Zorhan Bassong	(Canada)	43	0	2	36	0	1	0	0	0	5	0	1	2	0	0	0	0	0	0	0	0
Clément Bayiha	(Canada)	32	0	2	25	0	1	0	0	0	7	0	1	0	0	0	0	0	0	0	0	0
Kyle Bekker	(Canada)	24	2	0	21	2	0	1	0	0	2	0	0	0	0	0	0	0	0	0	0	0
Louis Béland-Goyette	(Canada)	11	0	1	11	0	1	0	0	0	0	0	0	0	0	0	0	0	0	0	0	0
Hernán Bernardello (Note: Designated player)	(Argentina)	68	1	6	53	1	4	6	0	0	7	0	1	2	0	1	0	0	0	0	0	0
Patrice Bernier	(Canada)	184	18	31	151	15	25	8	2	3	16	1	2	9	0	1	0	0	0	0	0	0
Alessandro Biello	(Canada)	4	0	0	2	0	0	0	0	0	2	0	0	0	0	0	0	0	0	0	0	0
Luis Binks	(England)	26	0	0	21	0	0	1	0	0	0	0	0	3	0	0	0	0	0	1	0	0
**Sebastian Breza**	(Canada)	62	0	0	46	0	0	0	0	0	11	0	0	4	0	0	1	0	0	0	0	0
Deian Boldor	(Romania)	5	0	0	5	0	0	0	0	0	0	0	0	0	0	0	0	0	0	0	0	0
Zachary Brault-Guillard	(Canada)	130	8	11	106	7	9	2	0	1	11	1	1	8	0	0	2	0	0	1	0	0
Justin Braun	(United States)	13	0	1	12	0	1	0	0	0	1	0	0	0	0	0	0	0	0	0	0	0
Jeb Brovsky	(United States)	76	4	3	65	3	3	1	0	0	7	1	0	3	0	0	0	0	0	0	0	0
Omar Browne	(Panama)	11	3	2	10	2	2	0	0	0	1	1	0	0	0	0	0	0	0	0	0	0
**Dawid Bugaj**	(Poland)	68	0	4	55	0	4	0	0	0	7	0	0	0	0	0	6	0	0	0	0	0
Evan Bush	(United States)	205	0	1	176	0	1	8	0	0	8	0	0	13	0	0	0	0	0	0	0	0
Víctor Cabrera	(Argentina)	114	1	2	93	0	0	8	0	1	9	0	0	4	1	1	0	0	0	0	0	0
Rudy Camacho	(France)	152	8	2	128	7	0	3	0	1	14	0	1	5	1	0	2	0	0	0	0	0
Hassoun Camara	(France)	164	9	8	134	7	8	7	0	0	14	1	0	9	1	0	0	0	0	0	0	0
George Campbell	(United States)	78	1	7	70	1	6	1	0	0	7	0	1	0	0	0	0	0	0	0	0	0
**Wikelman Carmona**	(Venezuela)	25	5	5	23	4	4	0	0	0	3	1	1	0	0	0	0	0	0	0	0	0
**Brayan Ceballos**	(Colombia)	9	0	0	7	0	0	0	0	0	2	0	0	0	0	0	0	0	0	0	0	0
David Choinière	(Canada)	7	1	0	5	0	0	0	0	0	2	1	0	0	0	0	0	0	0	0	0	0
Mathieu Choinière	(Canada)	140	12	13	119	11	10	1	0	0	12	0	2	2	0	1	5	1	0	0	0	0
Laurent Ciman	(Belgium)	107	4	4	85	2	3	8	1	1	8	1	0	6	0	0	0	0	0	0	0	0
Caden Clark	(United States)	41	4	11	35	4	10	1	0	0	2	0	0	0	0	0	3	0	1	0	0	0
Matías Cóccaro	(Uruguay)	25	5	1	22	4	1	0	0	0	0	0	0	0	0	0	3	1	0	0	0	0
Kenny Cooper	(United States)	2	1	0	1	0	0	0	0	0	1	1	0	0	0	0	0	0	0	0	0	0
Gabriele Corbo	(Italy)	84	0	3	70	0	2	1	0	0	7	0	1	1	0	0	5	0	0	0	0	0
Bernardo Corradi	(Italy)	13	4	1	11	4	1	0	0	0	2	0	0	0	0	0	0	0	0	0	0	0
Jorge Corrales	(Cuba)	24	0	2	18	0	2	1	0	0	1	0	0	3	0	0	0	0	0	1	0	0
Brandan Craig	(United States)	50	1	0	40	0	0	0	0	0	7	1	0	0	0	0	3	0	0	0	0	0
Maxime Crépeau	(Canada)	7	0	0	3	0	0	0	0	0	4	0	0	0	0	0	0	0	0	0	0	0
Mamadou Danso	(The Gambia)	3	0	1	3	0	1	0	0	0	0	0	0	0	0	0	0	0	0	0	0	0
Nick DePuy	(United States)	6	0	0	5	0	0	0	0	0	1	0	0	0	0	0	0	0	0	0	0	0
Marco Di Vaio	(Italy)	88	40	12	76	34	9	1	0	0	5	2	2	6	4	1	0	0	0	0	0	0
Amadou Dia	(United States)	1	0	0	1	0	0	0	0	0	0	0	0	0	0	0	0	0	0	0	0	0
Zakaria Diallo	(France)	25	3	2	23	3	2	0	0	0	2	0	0	0	0	0	0	0	0	0	0	0
Clément Diop	(Senegal)	42	0	0	30	0	0	1	0	0	6	0	0	4	0	0	0	0	0	1	0	0
Marco Donadel	(Italy)	83	3	15	67	3	10	8	0	3	4	0	1	4	0	1	0	0	0	0	0	0
Didier Drogba	(Ivory Coast)	41	23	9	33	21	7	6	1	1	2	1	1	0	0	0	0	0	0	0	0	0
Dilly Duka	(United States)	57	8	5	42	5	5	3	1	0	3	0	0	9	2	0	0	0	0	0	0	0
Bryce Duke	(United States)	89	7	11	76	5	7	1	0	0	6	1	1	0	0	0	7	1	1	0	0	0
Chris Duvall	(United States)	45	1	3	42	1	3	0	0	0	3	0	0	0	0	0	0	0	0	0	0	0
Blerim Džemaili	(Switzerland)	25	8	11	22	7	10	0	0	0	3	1	1	0	0	0	0	0	0	0	0	0
Raheem Edwards	(Canada)	42	2	5	39	2	5	1	0	0	1	0	0	0	0	0	1	0	0	0	0	0
**Olger Escobar**	(Guatemala)	42	1	3	37	1	2	0	0	0	2	0	1	0	0	0	3	0	0	0	0	0
Rod Fanni	(France)	47	1	0	41	1	0	1	0	0	1	0	0	3	0	0	0	0	0	1	0	0
Felipe	(Brazil)	108	14	25	94	12	24	1	0	0	7	2	0	6	0	1	0	0	0	0	0	0
Matteo Ferrari	(Italy)	94	1	1	83	1	1	1	0	0	4	0	0	6	0	0	0	0	0	0	0	0
Kyle Fisher	(United States)	26	1	0	22	1	0	0	0	0	4	0	0	0	0	0	0	0	0	0	0	0
Shaun Francis	(Jamaica)	6	0	0	6	0	0	0	0	0	0	0	0	0	0	0	0	0	0	0	0	0
Mike Fucito	(United States)	1	0	0	1	0	0	0	0	0	0	0	0	0	0	0	0	0	0	0	0	0
Jérémy Gagnon-Laparé	(Canada)	11	0	0	7	0	0	0	0	0	2	0	0	2	0	0	0	0	0	0	0	0
Josh Gardner	(United States)	6	0	0	6	0	0	0	0	0	0	0	0	0	0	0	0	0	0	0	0	0
**Thomas Gillier**	(Chile)	27	0	0	26	0	0	0	0	0	0	0	0	0	0	0	1	0	0	0	0	0
Santiago González	(Uruguay)	11	0	0	9	0	0	0	0	0	2	0	0	0	0	0	0	0	0	0	0	0
**Owen Graham-Roache**	(Canada)	15	0	1	8	0	0	0	0	0	5	0	1	0	0	0	2	0	0	0	0	0
**Aleksandr Guboglo**	(Canada)	29	0	1	24	0	1	0	0	0	2	0	0	0	0	0	3	0	0	0	0	0
Ahmed Hamdy	(Egypt)	53	3	1	45	3	1	0	0	0	7	0	0	0	0	0	1	0	0	0	0	0
**Fabian Herbers**	(Germany)	42	2	3	38	2	2	0	0	0	4	0	1	0	0	0	0	0	0	0	0	0
Aaron Herrera	(Guatemala)	23	0	2	19	0	2	0	0	0	2	0	0	0	0	0	2	0	0	0	0	0
**Bode Hidalgo**	(United States)	10	0	1	10	0	1	0	0	0	0	0	0	0	0	0	0	0	0	0	0	0
Erik Hurtado	(United States)	7	0	1	7	0	1	0	0	0	0	0	0	0	0	0	0	0	0	0	0	0
Dennis Iapichino	(Switzerland)	18	0	1	16	0	1	0	0	0	2	0	0	0	0	0	0	0	0	0	0	0
Sunusi Ibrahim	(Nigeria)	105	20	6	92	13	5	1	0	0	8	6	1	0	0	0	4	1	0	0	0	0
Ilias Iliadis	(Greece)	9	0	0	6	0	0	0	0	0	3	0	0	0	0	0	0	0	0	0	0	0
Ousman Jabang	(United States)	6	0	0	5	0	0	0	0	0	1	0	0	0	0	0	0	0	0	0	0	0
Anthony Jackson-Hamel	(Canada)	91	18	5	79	15	4	1	0	0	6	3	1	4	0	0	0	0	0	1	0	0
Iván Jaime	(Spain)	19	2	2	18	1	2	0	0	0	1	1	0	0	0	0	0	0	0	0	0	0
Bjørn Maars Johnsen	(Norway)	28	2	0	26	2	0	0	0	0	2	0	0	0	0	0	0	0	0	0	0	0
Alistair Johnston	(Canada)	39	4	5	33	4	5	2	0	0	1	0	0	3	0	0	0	0	0	0	0	0
Kei Kamara	(Sierra Leone)	39	9	8	32	9	7	2	0	0	2	0	1	3	0	0	0	0	0	0	0	0
**Samsy Keita**	(Canada)	3	0	0	3	0	0	0	0	0	0	0	0	0	0	0	0	0	0	0	0	0
Logan Ketterer	(United States)	1	0	0	0	0	0	0	0	0	1	0	0	0	0	0	0	0	0	0	0	0
Daniel Kinumbe	(Canada)	2	0	0	1	0	0	0	0	0	1	0	0	0	0	0	0	0	0	0	0	0
Mustafa Kizza	(Uganda)	23	0	3	19	0	3	1	0	0	2	0	0	1	0	0	0	0	0	0	0	0
Ismaël Koné	(Canada)	32	4	5	26	2	5	2	1	0	1	0	0	3	1	0	0	0	0	0	0	0
Bojan Krkić	(Spain)	31	7	3	25	8	2	1	0	0	2	0	0	2	0	1	0	0	0	1	0	0
Krzysztof Król	(Poland)	14	0	1	11	0	1	0	0	0	0	0	0	3	0	0	0	0	0	0	0	0
Ken Krolicki	(Japan)	40	0	0	34	0	0	0	0	0	6	0	0	0	0	0	0	0	0	0	0	0
Eric Kronberg	(United States)	11	0	0	5	0	0	0	0	0	6	0	0	0	0	0	0	0	0	0	0	0
Jojea Kwizera	(Rwanda)	15	0	1	12	0	1	1	0	0	2	0	0	0	0	0	0	0	0	0	0	0
Lassi Lappalainen	(Finland)	117	15	16	99	15	15	2	0	0	9	0	1	4	0	0	2	0	0	1	0	0
Gorka Larrea	(Spain)	10	0	0	9	0	0	0	0	0	0	0	0	1	0	0	0	0	0	0	0	0
Ariel Lassiter	(Costa Rica)	56	5	12	45	4	9	0	0	0	6	1	1	0	0	0	5	0	2	0	0	0
Wandrille Lefèvre	(Canada)	65	2	2	48	2	2	1	0	0	11	0	0	5	0	0	0	0	0	0	0	0
**Matty Longstaff**	(England)	45	2	6	40	2	5	0	0	0	5	0	1	0	0	0	0	0	0	0	0	0
Adrián López	(Spain)	1	0	0	0	0	0	0	0	0	0	0	0	1	0	0	0	0	0	0	0	0
Ivan Losenko	(Ukraine)	1	1	0	0	0	0	0	0	0	1	1	0	0	0	0	0	0	0	0	0	0
**Victor Loturi**	(Canada)	76	3	5	64	3	3	0	0	0	9	0	2	0	0	0	3	0	0	0	0	0
Daniel Lovitz	(United States)	91	1	9	84	1	8	0	0	0	7	0	1	0	0	0	0	0	0	0	0	0
Emanuel Maciel	(Argentina)	31	0	3	29	0	3	1	0	0	1	0	0	0	0	0	0	0	0	0	0	0
Calum Mallace	(Scotland)	103	1	8	80	1	6	6	0	0	8	0	1	9	0	1	0	0	0	0	0	0
Matteo Mancosu	(Italy)	69	17	9	61	12	7	5	4	2	3	1	0	0	0	0	0	0	0	0	0	0
Justin Mapp	(United States)	99	6	26	82	4	21	1	0	0	10	2	5	6	0	0	0	0	0	0	0	0
Jahkeele Marshall-Rutty	(Canada)	16	0	1	15	0	1	1	0	0	0	0	0	0	0	0	0	0	0	0	0	0
Josef Martínez	(Venezuela)	26	14	3	23	11	3	1	2	0	0	0	0	0	0	0	2	1	0	0	0	0
Jack McInerney	(United States)	54	18	2	43	11	1	0	0	0	6	4	1	5	3	0	0	0	0	0	0	0
Djordje Mihailovic (Note: Young designated player)	(United States)	68	16	24	61	13	22	2	2	1	1	0	0	4	1	1	0	0	0	0	0	0
Matko Miljevic	(United States)	45	3	5	35	2	2	0	0	0	6	1	3	4	0	0	0	0	0	0	0	0
Eric Miller	(United States)	34	0	3	30	0	1	0	0	0	2	0	2	2	0	0	0	0	0	0	0	0
Kamal Miller	(Canada)	67	3	6	60	3	6	2	0	0	1	0	0	4	0	0	0	0	0	0	0	0
Miguel Montaño	(Colombia)	3	0	0	3	0	0	0	0	0	0	0	0	0	0	0	0	0	0	0	0	0
**Efrain Morales**	(Bolivia)	34	1	2	28	0	2	0	0	0	4	0	0	0	0	0	2	1	0	0	0	0
Issey Nakajima-Farran	(Canada)	15	0	0	13	0	0	0	0	0	0	0	0	2	0	0	0	0	0	0	0	0
Lamar Neagle	(United States)	24	2	2	23	2	2	0	0	0	1	0	0	0	0	0	0	0	0	0	0	0
**Jalen Neal**	(United States)	38	1	0	33	1	0	0	0	0	5	0	0	0	0	0	0	0	0	0	0	0
Alessandro Nesta	(Italy)	34	0	1	31	0	1	0	0	0	1	0	0	2	0	0	0	0	0	0	0	0
Kristian Nicht	(Germany)	1	0	0	0	0	0	0	0	0	0	0	0	1	0	0	0	0	0	0	0	0
Harry Novillo	(Martinique)	11	1	2	11	1	2	0	0	0	0	0	0	0	0	0	0	0	0	0	0	0
Sanna Nyassi	(The Gambia)	64	8	5	54	8	4	0	0	0	6	0	1	4	0	0	0	0	0	0	0	0
Dominic Oduro	(Ghana)	111	18	13	89	15	6	7	2	3	9	1	0	6	0	4	0	0	0	0	0	0
Chinonso Offor	(Nigeria)	36	5	0	30	4	0	0	0	0	4	1	0	0	0	0	2	0	0	0	0	0
Orji Okwonkwo	(Nigeria)	50	10	4	41	9	4	1	0	0	4	0	0	3	1	0	0	0	0	1	0	0
Lucas Ontivero	(Argentina)	23	2	2	21	2	2	0	0	0	2	0	0	0	0	0	0	0	0	0	0	0
Kwadwo Opoku	(Ghana)	49	7	7	42	7	4	1	0	0	2	0	3	0	0	0	4	0	0	0	0	0
Karl Ouimette	(Canada)	28	1	1	20	1	1	0	0	0	5	0	0	3	0	0	0	0	0	0	0	0
**Prince Owusu**	(Ghana)	72	35	10	60	28	10	0	0	0	9	5	0	0	0	0	3	2	0	0	0	0
Ambroise Oyongo	(Cameroon)	72	3	7	60	2	6	8	1	1	4	0	0	0	0	0	0	0	0	0	0	0
James Pantemis	(Canada)	40	0	0	34	0	0	2	0	0	4	0	0	0	0	0	0	0	0	0	0	0
Daniele Paponi	(Italy)	23	4	1	16	2	1	1	0	0	2	1	0	4	1	0	0	0	0	0	0	0
Heath Pearce	(United States)	29	0	0	23	0	0	0	0	0	4	0	0	2	0	0	0	0	0	0	0	0
Tom Pearce	(England)	37	2	6	29	1	4	1	0	0	3	0	1	0	0	0	4	1	1	0	0	0
**Daniel Pereira**	(Venezuela)	14	1	1	12	0	1	0	0	0	2	1	0	0	0	0	0	0	0	0	0	0
Troy Perkins	(United States)	64	0	1	63	0	1	1	0	0	0	0	0	0	0	0	0	0	0	0	0	0
**Luca Petrasso**	(Canada)	73	2	12	63	2	10	0	0	0	7	0	2	0	0	0	3	0	0	0	0	0
Michael Petrasso	(Canada)	16	0	0	14	0	0	0	0	0	2	0	0	0	0	0	0	0	0	0	0	0
Ignacio Piatti	(Argentina)	163	79	43	135	66	35	8	5	3	12	6	1	8	2	4	0	0	0	0	0	0
**Samuel Piette**	(Canada)	263	3	12	231	3	12	3	0	0	18	0	0	4	0	0	6	0	0	1	0	0
Andrea Pisanu	(Italy)	17	1	1	14	1	1	1	0	0	1	0	0	1	0	0	0	0	0	0	0	0
Cameron Porter	(United States)	7	1	0	2	0	0	0	0	0	2	0	0	3	1	0	0	0	0	0	0	0
Romell Quioto	(Honduras)	94	38	20	81	34	19	2	1	0	3	1	0	7	2	1	0	0	0	1	0	0
**Viktor Radojević**	(Serbia)	4	0	0	4	0	0	0	0	0	0	0	0	0	0	0	0	0	0	0	0	0
Jukka Raitala	(Finland)	79	1	2	69	1	2	0	0	0	7	0	0	2	0	0	0	0	0	1	0	0
Sean Rea	(Canada)	18	1	2	15	0	2	0	0	0	3	1	0	0	0	0	0	0	0	0	0	0
Nigel Reo-Coker	(England)	40	0	3	28	0	2	3	0	0	3	0	1	6	0	0	0	0	0	0	0	0
Donovan Ricketts	(Jamaica)	26	0	0	24	0	0	0	0	0	2	0	0	0	0	0	0	0	0	0	0	0
**Daniel Ríos**	(Mexico)	34	10	2	28	7	2	0	0	0	6	3	0	0	0	0	0	0	0	0	0	0
Nelson Rivas	(Colombia)	13	0	1	11	0	1	1	0	0	1	0	0	0	0	0	0	0	0	0	0	0
Andrés Romero	(Argentina)	117	16	10	95	12	9	1	0	0	12	1	0	9	3	1	0	0	0	0	0	0
Ruan	(Brazil)	28	2	7	25	2	6	0	0	0	1	0	0	0	0	0	2	0	1	0	0	0
Bacary Sagna	(France)	40	2	4	35	2	3	0	0	0	5	0	1	0	0	0	0	0	0	0	0	0
Michael Salazar	(Belize)	36	6	3	34	5	3	0	0	0	2	1	0	0	0	0	0	0	0	0	0	0
Nathan Saliba	(Canada)	78	2	3	68	2	3	1	0	0	5	0	0	0	0	0	4	0	0	0	0	0
**Alexis Sánchez**	(Chile)	16	0	1	14	0	1	0	0	0	2	0	0	0	0	0	0	0	0	0	0	0
**Dante Sealy**	(Trinidad and Tobago)	44	9	3	37	9	2	0	0	0	5	0	0	0	0	0	3	0	1	0	0	0
Eduardo Sebrango	(Cuba)	8	0	0	7	0	0	0	0	0	1	0	0	0	0	0	0	0	0	0	0	0
Amar Sejdič	(Bosnia and Herzegovina)	26	3	1	22	2	0	1	0	1	0	0	0	3	1	0	0	0	0	0	0	0
Harry Shipp	(United States)	30	2	3	27	2	3	2	0	0	1	0	0	0	0	0	0	0	0	0	0	0
Shamit Shome	(Bangladesh)	52	1	1	45	1	1	0	0	0	6	0	0	1	0	0	0	0	0	0	0	0
Alejandro Silva	(Uruguay)	33	6	11	31	5	11	0	0	0	2	1	0	0	0	0	0	0	0	0	0	0
Jonathan Sirois	(Canada)	102	0	0	89	0	0	1	0	0	6	0	0	0	0	0	6	0	0	0	0	0
Blake Smith	(United States)	25	2	1	19	2	1	0	0	0	3	0	0	3	0	0	0	0	0	0	0	0
Joaquín Sosa	(Uruguay)	23	0	0	19	0	0	0	0	0	1	0	0	0	0	0	3	0	0	0	0	0
Bakary Soumaré	(Mali)	16	0	0	10	0	0	0	0	0	0	0	0	6	0	0	0	0	0	0	0	0
Noah Streit	(Switzerland)	29	1	3	25	1	3	0	0	0	4	0	0	0	0	0	0	0	0	0	0	0
Aljaž Struna	(Slovenia)	19	1	0	18	1	0	0	0	0	1	0	0	0	0	0	0	0	0	0	0	0
Greg Sutton	(Canada)	1	0	0	1	0	0	0	0	0	0	0	0	0	0	0	0	0	0	0	0	0
**Hennadiy Synchuk**	(Ukraine)	46	3	2	37	3	1	0	0	0	6	0	0	0	0	0	3	0	1	0	0	0
Ballou Tabla	(Canada)	39	6	2	32	3	2	0	0	0	5	3	0	2	0	0	0	0	0	0	0	0
Saphir Taïder	(Algeria)	86	22	24	76	20	21	0	0	0	7	1	3	2	1	0	0	0	0	1	0	0
Róbert Thorkelsson	(Iceland)	26	0	0	21	0	0	0	0	0	3	0	0	2	0	0	0	0	0	0	0	0
Maxim Tissot	(Canada)	61	5	2	44	5	1	0	0	0	8	0	0	9	0	1	0	0	0	0	0	0
Shavar Thomas	(Jamaica)	17	0	0	15	0	0	0	0	0	2	0	0	0	0	0	0	0	0	0	0	0
Donny Toia	(United States)	60	1	3	48	1	2	4	0	0	2	0	0	6	0	1	0	0	0	0	0	0
Dagur Dan Þórhallsson	(Iceland)	13	1	0	10	1	0	0	0	0	3	0	0	0	0	0	0	0	0	0	0	0
Joaquín Torres	(Argentina)	62	7	13	55	7	12	1	0	0	2	0	0	4	0	1	0	0	0	0	0	0
Mason Toye	(United States)	71	13	2	64	13	2	3	0	0	2	0	0	1	0	0	1	0	0	0	0	0
Siniša Ubiparipović	(Bosnia and Herzegovina)	16	2	0	13	2	0	0	0	0	3	0	0	0	0	0	0	0	0	0	0	0
Maximiliano Urruti	(Argentina)	55	9	9	46	9	8	0	0	0	6	0	1	2	0	0	0	0	0	1	0	0
Zarek Valentin	(United States)	15	1	1	15	1	1	0	0	0	0	0	0	0	0	0	0	0	0	0	0	0
Jeisson Vargas	(Chile)	21	4	1	19	4	0	0	0	0	2	0	1	0	0	0	0	0	0	0	0	0
Johan Venegas	(Costa Rica)	41	3	2	32	2	1	7	1	1	2	0	0	0	0	0	0	0	0	0	0	0
**Brayan Vera**	(Colombia)	29	1	0	26	1	0	0	0	0	3	0	0	0	0	0	0	0	0	0	0	0
Jules-Anthony Vilsaint	(Canada)	45	3	5	39	3	4	1	0	0	4	0	0	0	0	0	1	0	0	0	0	0
Giacomo Vrioni	(Albania)	10	4	0	9	3	0	0	0	0	1	1	0	0	0	0	0	0	0	0	0	0
Tyson Wahl	(United States)	13	0	0	11	0	0	0	0	0	2	0	0	0	0	0	0	0	0	0	0	0
Victor Wanyama	(Kenya)	133	6	10	117	5	9	2	0	0	5	1	0	6	0	1	2	0	0	1	0	0
Collen Warner	(United States)	66	1	1	55	1	1	1	0	0	7	0	0	3	0	0	0	0	0	0	0	0
Joel Waterman	(Canada)	158	5	12	130	4	12	3	0	0	11	1	0	6	0	0	8	0	0	0	0	0
Andrew Wenger	(United States)	59	8	3	51	6	3	1	0	0	4	1	0	3	1	0	0	0	0	0	0	0
Romario Williams	(Jamaica)	2	0	0	2	0	0	0	0	0	0	0	0	0	0	0	0	0	0	0	0	0
Dominik Yankov	(Bulgaria)	27	2	2	24	2	2	0	0	0	2	0	0	0	0	0	1	0	0	0	0	0
Karifa Yao	(Canada)	2	0	0	2	0	0	0	0	0	0	0	0	0	0	0	0	0	0	0	0	0
Rida Zouhir	(Morocco)	27	0	2	19	0	0	0	0	0	6	0	2	2	0	0	0	0	0	0	0	0

== List of Goalies ==
Competitive matches only. Players in bold are now on the team roster. Stats and roster are accurate as of November 3, 2026 2026 season.

Player		Total			MLS			MLS Playoffs			Canadian Championship			CONCACAF Champions League			Leagues Cup			Other Official Tournaments		
Name	Nation	Apps	Wins	Clean Sheet	Apps	Wins	Clean Sheet	Apps	Wins	Clean Sheet	Apps	Wins	Clean Sheet	Apps	Wins	Clean Sheet	Apps	Wins	Clean Sheet	Apps	Wins	Clean Sheet
**Sebastian Breza**	(Canada)	62	25	9	46	17	5	0	0	0	11	7	3	4	1	1	1	0	0	0	0	0
Evan Bush	(United States)	205	79	50	176	64	40	8	6	2	8	3	3	13	6	5	0	0	0	0	0	0
Maxime Crépeau	(Canada)	7	1	0	3	0	0	0	0	0	4	1	0	0	0	0	0	0	0	0	0	0
Clément Diop	(Senegal)	42	14	12	30	10	7	1	0	0	6	3	3	4	1	2	0	0	0	1	0	0
**Thomas Gillier**	(Chile)	28	7	4	27	7	4	0	0	0	0	0	0	0	0	0	1	0	0	0	0	0
**Samsy Keita**	(Canada)	3	0	0	3	0	0	0	0	0	0	0	0	0	0	0	0	0	0	0	0	0
Logan Ketterer	(United States)	1	1	1	0	0	0	0	0	0	1	1	1	0	0	0	0	0	0	0	0	0
Eric Kronberg	(United States)	11	1	2	5	0	0	0	0	0	6	1	2	0	0	0	0	0	0	0	0	0
Kristian Nicht	(Germany)	1	0	0	0	0	0	0	0	0	0	0	0	1	0	0	0	0	0	0	0	0
James Pantemis	(Canada)	40	19	10	34	15	7	2	1	1	4	3	2	0	0	0	0	0	0	0	0	0
Troy Perkins	(United States)	64	21	17	63	21	17	1	0	0	0	0	0	0	0	0	0	0	0	0	0	0
Donovan Ricketts	(Jamaica)	26	9	4	24	9	3	0	0	0	2	0	1	0	0	0	0	0	0	0	0	0
Jonathan Sirois	(Canada)	102	33	24	89	27	23	1	0	0	6	3	1	0	0	0	6	3	0	0	0	0
Greg Sutton	(Canada)	1	0	0	1	0	0	0	0	0	0	0	0	0	0	0	0	0	0	0	0	0

== Players without Matches ==
- Michael Adedokun
- Bryan Arguez
- Jason Beaulieu
- Paolo DelPiccolo
- Grayson Doody
- Keesean Ferdinand
- Gienir García
- Emil Gazdov
- Tomas Giraldo
- Evan James
- Mechack Jérôme
- Thomas Meilleur-Giguère
- Zakaria Messoudi
- Josh-Duc Nteziryayo
- Luca Ricci
- Maxi Rodríguez
- Steeven Saba
- Félix Samson
- Matteo Schiavoni
- John Smits
- Gege Soriola

== Former Montreal Impact Academy Players ==
- Nazim Belguendouz
- Kevin Cossette
- John Dinkota
- Chakib Hocine
- Jems Geffrard
- Daniel Fabrizi
- Mastanabal Kacher
- Mylord Kasai
- Aron Mkungilwa
- Victor N'Diaye
- David Paulmin
- Zachary Sukunda
- Stefan Vukovic
- Valentin Radevich
- Mélé Temguia
- Mircea Ilcu
- Jimmy-Shammar Sanon
- Alessandro Riggi
- Marco Dominguez
- Fabio Morelli
- Brandon Onkony
- Jon-Michael Vieira

== Sources ==
- "MLS Number Assignments Archive".
