= Sebastian Breza =

Canadian soccer player (born 1998)

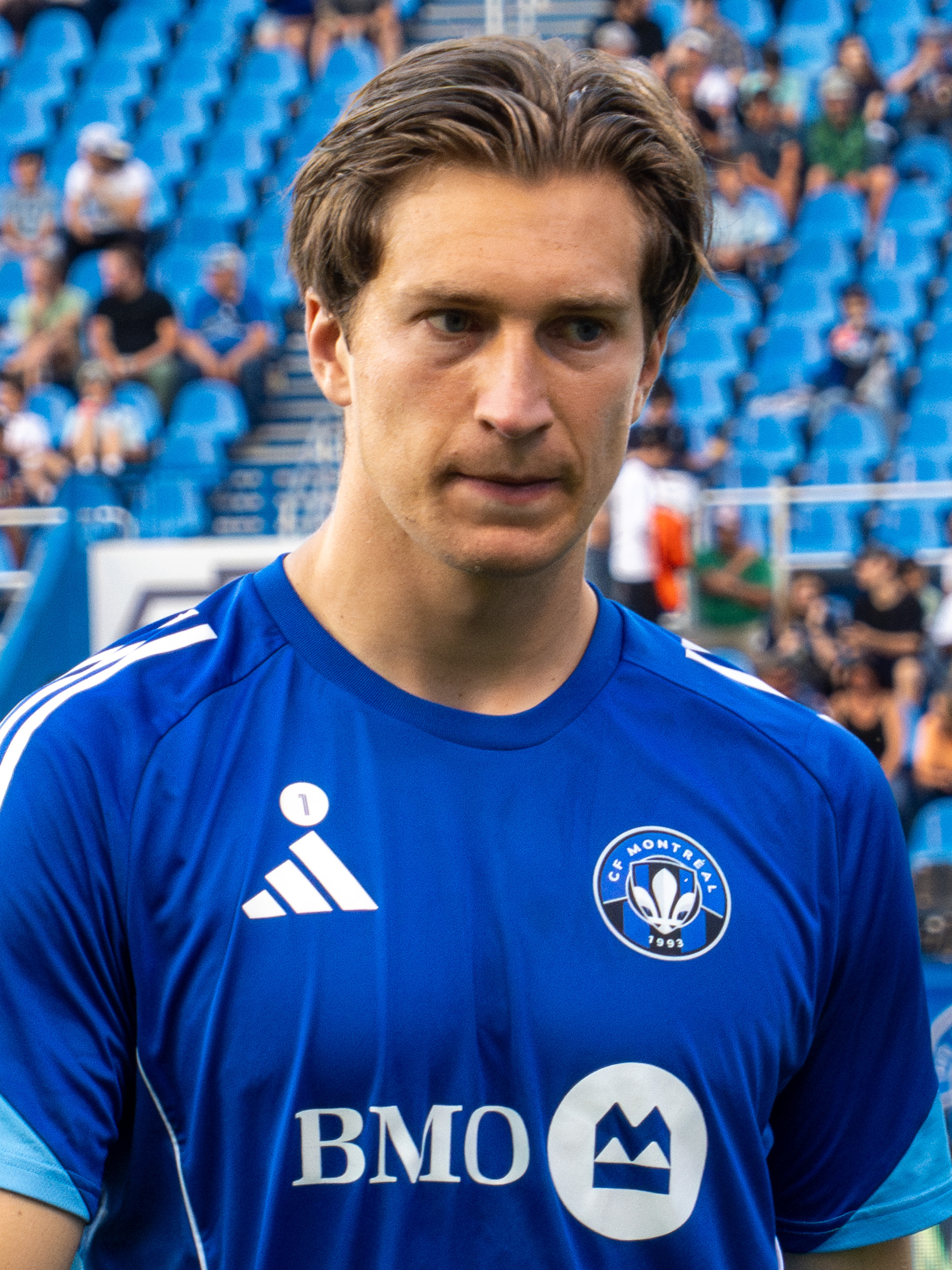
- Breza in 2025

Personal information
- Full name: Sebastian Jean-Baptiste Breza
- Date of birth: March 15, 1998 (age 28)
- Place of birth: Ottawa, Ontario, Canada
- Height: 1.93 m (6 ft 4 in)
- Position: Goalkeeper

Team information
- Current team: CF Montreal
- Number: 1

Youth career
- 2007–20??: FS Salaberry
- –2014: CS Sainte-Julie
- 2014–2016: Monopoli
- 2016–2017: Palermo

Senior career*
Years	Team	Apps	(Gls)
2016–2017	Monopoli	0	(0)
2017	→ Palermo (loan)	0	(0)
2017–2020	Potenza	44	(0)
2019–2020	→ Bologna (loan)	0	(0)
2020–2023	Bologna	0	(0)
2021–2022	→ CF Montréal (loan)	31	(0)
2023	→ Carrarese (loan)	15	(0)
2023	→ Yverdon (loan)	5	(0)
2024–	CF Montréal	15	(0)

International career^{‡}
2016	Canada U20	1	(0)
- * Club domestic league appearances and goals as of October 17, 2026 ‡ National team caps and goals as of January 1, 2024

Sebastian Jean-Baptiste Breza (born March 15, 1998) is a Canadian professional soccer player who plays as a goalkeeper for Major League Soccer club CF Montréal.

== Club career ==
=== Early career ===
Breza was nine years old when he started playing soccer at FS Salaberry. As a youth, Breza played goaltender in both hockey and soccer. In 2016, he signed with Serie C club Monopoli, and was loaned to Serie A club Palermo in 2017, initially playing for the latter's Primavera side. Breza made three appearances on the bench for Palermo's first team squad in the 2016–17 Serie A season.

=== Potenza ===
In 2017, Breza signed for Serie D club Potenza, helping them gain promotion to Serie C for the 2018–19 season. During the offseason, he was rumoured to go to fellow Serie D club Taranto. In his second season, Breza largely played a backup role to Raffaele Ioime, but made 8 starts. In January 2020, Breza was linked with a move to Serie A club Bologna.

=== Bologna ===
On January 29, 2020, he joined Serie A club Bologna on loan until June 30, 2020. Bologna held an obligation to purchase his rights at the end of the loan.

==== Loan to CF Montréal ====
On April 6, 2021, Breza was loaned to CF Montréal of Major League Soccer for the 2021 season. He made his debut on August 8 against D.C. United. Breza was given the start in the semifinal of the 2021 Canadian Championship against Forge FC, and the game went to penalties after a 0-0 after 90 minutes. The shootout was still tied after 10 rounds, and Breza was able to stop the shot from Forge goalkeeper Triston Henry, before scoring himself to win the game and advance Montréal to the final. CF Montréal went on to win the Voyageurs Cup and Breza was honoured with the George Gross Memorial Trophy as the most valuable player of the tournament.

Upon completion of the 2021 season, CF Montréal announced they would not exercise the option to purchase Breza's contract. However, in January 2022 CF Montréal announced Breza would return to the club for the 2022 season on loan.

==== Loan to Carrarese ====
On 27 January 2023, Breza joined Serie C side Carrarese on loan until the end of the season.

==== Loan to Yverdon ====
On July 12, 2023, he joined Swiss Super League club Yverdon on a season long loan.

=== Return to CF Montréal ===
On January 15, 2024, Breza made the permanent move to CF Montréal on a two-year deal. After the 2025 season, Breza would sign a two year extension with the club through the 2027 season, with club options for 2028 and 2029.

== International career ==
Breza was born in Canada to a Polish father and Norwegian mother, and holds dual citizenship with Canada and Norway. He attended his first camp for the Canadian U-20 team in 2016. Breza was named to the Canadian U-23 provisional roster for the 2020 CONCACAF Men's Olympic Qualifying Championship on February 26, 2020.

== Career statistics ==
As of October 21, 2026

Club	League	Season	League		Cup		Other		Continental		Total	
Club	League	Season	Apps	Goals	Apps	Goals	Apps	Goals	Apps	Goals	Apps	Goals
Monopoli	Serie C	2017–18	0	0	0	0	1	0	–		1	0
Potenza	Serie D	2017–18	29	0	0	0	1	0	–		0	0
Potenza	Serie C	2018–19	8	0	0	0	5	0	–		13	0
Potenza	Serie C	2019–20	7	0	1	0	2	0	–		10	0
Potenza	Total		44	0	1	0	8	0	0	0	53	0
CF Montreal (loan)	MLS	2021	8	0	3	0	0	0	–		11	0
CF Montreal (loan)	MLS	2022	23	0	0	0	0	0	4	0	27	0
CF Montreal (loan)	Total		31	0	3	0	0	0	4	0	38	0
Carrarese (loan)	Serie C	2022–23	15	0	0	0	0	0	–		15	0
Yverdon (loan)	Swiss Super League	2023–24	5	0	1	0	0	0	–		6	0
CF Montréal	MLS	2024	1	0	2	0	1	0	–		4	0
CF Montréal	MLS	2025	3	0	0	0	0	0	–		3	0
CF Montréal	MLS	2026	11	0	6	0	0	0	–		17	0
CF Montréal	Total		15	0	8	0	1	0	0	0	24	0
Career total			110	0	13	0	10	0	4	0	137	0

== Honours ==
CF Montreal

- Canadian Championship: 2021

Individual

- George Gross Memorial Trophy: 2021

== See also ==
- 2020 CONCACAF Men's Olympic Qualifying Championship squads
- All-time CF Montréal roster
