= 2025 CF Montréal season =

Canadian Major League Soccer team

CF Montréal
2025 season
- Owner: Joey Saputo
- Head coach: Laurent Courtois (until March 24); Marco Donadel (interim, from March 24)
- Stadium: Saputo Stadium
- Major League Soccer: Conference: 13th Overall: 28th
- MLS Cup playoffs: Did not qualify
- Canadian Championship: Quarter-finals
- Leagues Cup: League phase
- Top goalscorer: League: Prince Owusu (13); All: Prince Owusu (17)
- Average home league attendance: 16,162
Home colours	Away colours

The 2025 CF Montréal season was the club's 32nd season of existence, and their 14th in Major League Soccer, the top tier of the American soccer pyramid.

In addition to competing in MLS, the club also played in the Canadian Championship and the Leagues Cup.

== Squad ==
As of September 5, 2025

No.	Player	Nationality	Position	Date of birth (age at year end)	Previous club
Goalkeepers
1	Sebastian Breza	CAN	GK	March 15, 1998 (age 28)	(Italy) Bologna
31	Thomas Gillier	CHI	GK	May 28, 2004 (age 22)	(Italy) Bologna
40	Jonathan Sirois	CAN	GK	July 27, 2001 (age 25)	(Canada) Montreal Impact Academy
Defenders
2	Jalen Neal	USA	CB	August 24, 2003 (age 23)	(United States) LA Galaxy
3	Tom Pearce	ENG	LB	April 12, 1998 (age 28)	(England) Wigan Athletic
4	Fernando Álvarez	COL	CB	August 24, 2003 (age 23)	(Mexico) Pachuca
5	Brandan Craig	USA	DF	April 7, 2004 (age 22)	(United States) Philadelphia Union
13	Luca Petrasso	CAN	DF	June 16, 2000 (age 26)	(Italy) Triestina
19	Bode Hidalgo	USA	FB	February 22, 2002 (age 24)	(United States) Real Salt Lake
24	Efrain Morales	BOL	CB	March 4, 2004 (age 22)	(United States) Atlanta United FC
25	Dante Sealy	TRI	DF	April 17, 2003 (age 23)	(United States) FC Dallas
27	Dawid Bugaj	POL	RB	July 9, 2004 (age 22)	(Italy) SPAL
39	Aleksandr Guboglo	CAN	FB	March 7, 2007 (age 19)	(Canada) Montreal Impact Academy
Midfielders
6	Samuel Piette	CAN	DM	November 12, 1994 (age 31)	(Spain) Izarra
8	Matty Longstaff	ENG	MF	March 21, 2000 (age 26)	(Canada) Toronto FC
10	Bryce Duke	USA	CM	February 28, 2001 (age 25)	(United States) Inter Miami CF
11	Iván Jaime	SPA	AM	September 26, 2000 (age 26)	(Portugal) Porto
18	Hennadiy Synchuk	UKR	MF	July 10, 2006 (age 20)	(Ukraine) Metalist Kharkiv
21	Fabian Herbers	GER	CM	August 17, 1993 (age 33)	(United States) Chicago Fire FC
22	Victor Loturi	CAN	CM	May 21, 2001 (age 25)	(Scotland) Ross County
29	Olger Escobar	GUA	AM	September 11, 2006 (age 20)	(United States) New England Revolution II
Attackers
7	Kwadwo Opoku	GHA	FW	July 13, 2001 (age 25)	(United States) Los Angeles FC
9	Prince Owusu	GER	FW	January 7, 1997 (age 29)	(Canada) Toronto FC
14	Sunusi Ibrahim	NGA	FW	October 1, 2002 (age 24)	(Nigeria) Nasarawa United
17	Giacomo Vrioni	ALB	FW	October 15, 1998 (age 28)	(United States) New England Revolution
35	Owen Graham-Roache	CAN	FW	February 11, 2008 (age 18)	(Canada) Montreal Impact Academy

=== International roster slots ===
Montreal had five MLS International Roster Slots for use in the 2025 season. The club traded away three of the eight original allocation to the New York Red Bulls, LA Galaxy & D.C. United. The club acquired an additional spot from Sporting Kansas City. In addition, starting in 2022, CF Montréal were allowed to make three international players exempt from status if they had been on the roster for more than one year.

CF Montréal International slots
Slot	Player	Nationality
Exempt	Kwadwo Opoku	Ghana
Exempt	Sunusi Ibrahim	Nigeria
Exempt	Tom Pearce	England
1	Thomas Gillier	Chile
2	Dawid Bugaj	Poland
3	Prince Owusu	Germany
4	Hennadiy Synchuk	Ukraine
5	Matty Longstaff	England
6	Iván Jaime	Spain

Foreign-Born Players with Domestic Status
Player	Nationality
Fernando Álvarez	Colombia / (United States) USA
Olger Escobar	Guatemala / (United States) USA
Efrain Morales	Bolivia / (United States) USA
Dante Sealy	(Trinidad and Tobago) Trinidad & Tobago / (United States) USA
Aleksandr Guboglo	Haiti / Canada
Fabian Herbers	Germany ^{G}
Giacomo Vrioni	Albania ^{G}

- (Canada) – Player is Canadian citizen;
- (United States) – Player was US citizen;
- G – Player had US green card;
- C – Player had permanent Canadian residency.

== Management ==
As of January 14, 2023

- (Canada) Joey Saputo – owner
- (Canada) Luca Saputo – managing director, recruitment and sporting methodology
- (Canada) Simone Saputo – managing director, academy strategy and roster management
- (Canada) Gabriel Gervais – president and chief executive officer
- (Canada) Eric Nadeau – vice-president & chief revenue officer
- (Canada) Amélie Vaillancourt – vice-president and chief human resource officer
- (Canada) Samia Chebeir – vice-president and chief marketing officer
- (Canada) Daniel Pozzi – Director Soccer Operations & Roster Compliance

== Coaching staff ==
As of June 16, 2025

- (Italy) Marco Donadel – Interim Head Coach
- (France) David Sauvry – Assistant Coach
- (Italy) Lorenzo Pinzauti – Assistant Coach
- (United States) Kobié Johnson – Assistant Coach
- (Canada) Maxime Leconte – Assistant Coach
- (Italy) Vincenzo Benvenuto – Goalkeeper Coach
- (Italy) Stefano Pasquali – Performance Coach
- (Canada) Dhia Amara – Strength and Conditioning Coach
- (England) Paul Bower – Physical Performance Coach
- (France) Louan Schlicht – Video Analyst

== Player movement ==
=== In ===
Per Major League Soccer and club policies, terms of the deals were not disclosed.

No.	Pos.	Player	Transferred from	Fee/notes	Date	Source
21	MF	(Germany) Fabian Herbers	(United States) Chicago Fire FC	Undisclosed deal for the 2025 and 2026 seasons	January 3, 2025	
26	MF	(Nigeria) Michael Adedokun	(United States) Ohio State Buckeyes	MLS SuperDraft, undisclosed one-year contract with additional three option years	January 4, 2025	
2	DF	(United States) Jalen Neal	(United States) LA Galaxy	$450,000 in 2025 and $200,000 in 2026 GAM and a 2025 international roster spot	January 6, 2025	
17	FW	(Albania) Giacomo Vrioni	(United States) New England Revolution	$50,000 in 2025 General Allocation Money (GAM)	January 7, 2025	
9	FW	(Germany) Prince Owusu	(Canada) Toronto FC	$100,000 in 2025 and $75,000 in 2026 GAM and $75,000 in conditional GAM to Toronto FC.	January 13, 2025	
22	MF	(Canada) Victor Loturi	(Scotland) Ross County	Free Transfer	January 28, 2025	
18	MF	(Ukraine) Hennadiy Synchuk	(Ukraine) Metalist Kharkiv	Transfer Fee	January 28, 2025	
35	FW	(Canada) Owen Graham-Roache	(Canada) Montreal Impact Academy	Signed a home grown contract	February 5, 2025	
25	DF	(Trinidad and Tobago) Dante Sealy	(United States) FC Dallas	Free Transfer	February 6, 2025	
13	DF	(Canada) Luca Petrasso	(United States) Orlando City SC	Free Transfer	February 7, 2025	
5	DF	(United States) Brandan Craig	(United States) Philadelphia Union	Free Transfer	February 7, 2025	
39	DF	(Canada) Aleksandr Guboglo	(Canada) Montreal Impact Academy	Signed a home grown contract	February 26, 2025	
33	GK	(Canada) Emil Gazdov	(Canada) Pacific FC	Transfer Fee	February 28, 2025	
29	MF	(Guatemala) Olger Escobar	(United States) New England Revolution II	Transferred for $120,000 in GAM	April 24, 2025	
24	DF	(Bolivia) Efrain Morales	(United States) Atlanta United FC	$425,000 GAM in 2025	July 23, 2025	
8	MF	(England) Matty Longstaff	(Canada) Toronto FC	Jules-Anthony Vilsaint & $225,000 GAM in 2025	August 13, 2025	
19	DF	(United States) Bode Hidalgo	(United States) Real Salt Lake	2026 2nd round MLS SuperDraft pick & $200,000 GAM in 2025	August 21, 2025	

=== Out ===
No.	Pos.	Player	Transferred to	Fee/notes	Date	Source
25	DF	(Italy) Gabriele Corbo	(Spain) Córdoba	Option declined	November 21, 2024	
23	DF	(United States) Grayson Doody	(United States) Orange County SC	Option declined	November 21, 2024	
44	DF	(Canada) Raheem Edwards	(United States) New York Red Bulls	Option declined	November 21, 2024	
5	MF	(Greece) Ilias Iliadis	(Bulgaria) Pirin Blagoevgrad	Option declined	November 21, 2024	
21	FW	(Finland) Lassi Lappalainen	(United States) Columbus Crew	Option declined	November 21, 2024	
17	FW	(Venezuela) Josef Martínez	(United States) San Jose Earthquakes	Option declined	November 21, 2024	
27	MF	(Canada) Matteo Schiavoni	(Canada) Pacific FC	Option declined	November 21, 2024	
26	DF	(Iceland) Róbert Orri Þorkelsson	(Denmark) Sønderjyske	Option declined	November 21, 2024	
18	MF	(Canada) Rida Zouhir	(United States) D.C. United	Option declined	November 21, 2024	
3	DF	(Uruguay) Joaquín Sosa	(Italy) Reggiana	End of Loan	November 21, 2024	
2	MF	(Kenya) Victor Wanyama	(Scotland) Dunfermline Athletic	Out of Contract	November 21, 2024	
33	GK	(United States) Logan Ketterer	(United States) Lexington SC	Out of Contract	November 21, 2024	
15	DF	(United States) Ousman Jabang	(United States) New Mexico United	Transfer Fee	March 19, 2025	
8	MF	(Bulgaria) Dominik Yankov	(Croatia) Rijeka	Transfer Fee	June 21, 2025	
19	MF	(Canada) Nathan Saliba	(Belgium) Anderlecht	Transfer Fee	June 26, 2025	
--	MF	(Canada) Malik Henry	(Canada) Toronto FC	Transferred for $75,000 in GAM & 3rd Round Pick	July 3, 2025	
24	DF	(United States) George Campbell	(England) West Bromwich Albion	Transfer Fee	July 18, 2025	
28	FW	(Canada) Jules-Anthony Vilsaint	(Canada) Toronto FC	Matty Longstaff	August 13, 2025	
16	DF	(Canada) Joel Waterman	(United States) Chicago Fire FC	Transferred for $500,000 in GAM	August 20, 2025	
23	MF	(United States) Caden Clark	(United States) D.C. United	Transfer fee of $700,000	August 21, 2025	
26	MF	(Nigeria) Michael Adedokun	(United States) Lexington SC	Transfer fee	August 21, 2025	

=== Loans in ===
No.	Pos.	Player	Loaned from	Loan start date	Loan end date	Source
31	GK	(Chile) Thomas Gillier	(Italy) Bologna	July 8, 2025	December 31, 2025	
11	MF	(Spain) Iván Jaime	(Portugal) Porto	August 22, 2025	June 30, 2026	

=== Loans out ===
No.	Pos.	Player	Loaned to	Loan start date	Loan end date	Source
9	FW	(Uruguay) Matías Cóccaro	(Mexico) Atlas	January 4, 2025	December 31,2025	
38	MF	(Canada) Alessandro Biello	(Canada) HFX Wanderers FC	February 18, 2025	December 31,2025	
26	MF	(Nigeria) Michael Adedokun	(United States) Lexington SC	March 20, 2025	August 21,2025	
11	DF	(Canada) Jahkeele Marshall-Rutty	(United States) Charlotte FC	April 23, 2025	December 31,2025	
33	GK	(Canada) Emil Gazdov	(Canada) Valour FC	August 16, 2025	December 31,2025	

=== MLS SuperDraft picks ===
Round	No.	Pos.	Player	College/Club team	Transaction	Source
1	13	MF	(Nigeria) Michael Adedokun	Ohio State Buckeyes	Signed	
2	44	FW	(United States) Arik Duncan	University of California Berkeley		
3	50	FW	(United States) Caden Grabfelder	Pennsylvania State University		
4	73	DF	(France) Arthur Duquenne	Clemson University		

== Friendlies ==
=== Pre-season ===
==== Matches ====
Win Draw Loss

January 24 1	FC Cincinnati	1–0	CF Montréal	Tampa, FL
12:00 PM	A. Chirila 56'

February 8 2	Orlando City SC	1–2	CF Montréal	Orlando, FL
4:00 PM	Lodeiro 120'	Report	Yankov 97'; Ibrahim 110'	Stadium: Inter&Co Stadium

February 14 3	Philadelphia Union	1–0	CF Montréal	Orlando, FL
1:00 PM	Bedoya 50'	Report

February 15 4	Tampa Bay Rowdies	1–3	CF Montréal	Auburndale, FL
6:00 PM	Pacius 66'	Report	Vilsaint 28', 54' Sunusi 67'	Stadium: Lake Myrtle Sports Complex

== Major League Soccer regular season ==
=== Tables ===
==== Eastern Conference ====
MLS Eastern Conference table (2025)
Pos	Team	Pld	W	L	T	GF	GA	GD	Pts
11	New England Revolution	34	9	16	9	44	51	−7	36
12	Toronto FC	34	6	14	14	37	44	−7	32
13	CF Montréal	34	6	18	10	34	60	−26	28
14	Atlanta United FC	34	5	16	13	38	63	−25	28
15	D.C. United	34	5	18	11	30	66	−36	26

Source: MLS
Rules for classification: 1) points; 2) total wins; 3) total goal differential; 4) total goals scored; 5) fewer disciplinary points; 6) away goal differential; 7) away goals scored; 8) home goals differential; 9) home goals scored; 10) coin toss (2 clubs tied) or drawing of lots (≥3 clubs tied)

==== Overall ====
Overall MLS standings table (2025)
Pos	Team	Pld	W	L	T	GF	GA	GD	Pts	Qualification
26	LA Galaxy	34	7	18	9	46	66	−20	30	Qualification for the CONCACAF Champions Cup round one (Note: As third place of Leagues Cup)
27	Sporting Kansas City	34	7	20	7	46	70	−24	28	
28	CF Montréal	34	6	18	10	34	60	−26	28	
29	Atlanta United FC	34	5	16	13	38	63	−25	28	
30	D.C. United	34	5	18	11	30	66	−36	26	

Source: MLS
Rules for classification: 1) points; 2) total wins; 3) total goal differential; 4) total goals scored; 5) fewer disciplinary points; 6) away goal differential; 7) away goals scored; 8) home goals differential; 9) home goals scored; 10) coin toss (2 clubs tied) or drawing of lots (≥3 clubs tied)

=== Matches ===
Win Draw Loss

February 22 1	Atlanta United FC	3–2	CF Montréal	Atlanta, GA
7:30 PM EST	Latte Lath 42', 63', (yellow card) 69'; Klich (yellow card) 80'; Mosquera 85', (yellow card) 90+1'	Report	Opoku (yellow card) 34'; Saliba 47', (yellow card) 80'; Owusu 71'	Stadium: Mercedes-Benz Stadium; Attendance: 65,520; Referee: Pierre-Luc Lauziere

March 1 2	Minnesota United FC	1–0	CF Montréal	Saint Paul, MN
8:30 PM EST	Oluwaseyi (yellow card) 49'; Yeboah 69'	Report	Jabang (yellow card) 43'; Marshall-Rutty (yellow card) 67'	Stadium: Allianz Field; Attendance: 17,745; Referee: Sergii Demianchuk

March 8 3	Vancouver Whitecaps FC	2–0	CF Montréal	Vancouver, BC
9:30 PM EST	Laborda 32'; Johnson 49'; Ngando (yellow card) 90+4'	Report	Petrasso (yellow card) 39'; Craig (yellow card) 41'	Stadium: BC Place; Attendance: 19,531; Referee: Joe Dickerson

March 15 4	D.C. United	0–0	CF Montréal	Washington, D.C.
7:30 PM EDT	Herrera (yellow card) 12'; Rowles (yellow card) 45+1'; Schnegg (yellow card) 67'	Report	Herbers (yellow card) 19'; Sealy (yellow card) 33'; Clark (yellow card) 68'; Waterman (yellow card) 71'; Saliba (yellow card) 90+2'	Stadium: Audi Field; Attendance: 16,133; Referee: Guido Gonzales Jr.

March 22 5	Nashville SC	3–0	CF Montréal	Nashville, TN
8:30 PM EDT	Muyl 56'; Bauer 62'; Pérez 67'	Report	Loturi (yellow card) 69'	Stadium: Geodis Park; Attendance: 25,301; Referee: Lorenzo Hernandez

March 29 6	Chicago Fire FC	1–1	CF Montréal	Chicago, IL
8:30 PM EDT	Zinckernagel 40', (yellow card) 53'; Gutman (yellow card) 47'	Report	Loturi (yellow card) 23'; Sealy 51'	Stadium: Soldier Field; Attendance: 16,278; Referee: Elijio Arreguin

April 5 7	Columbus Crew	2–1	CF Montréal	Columbus, OH
7:30 PM EDT	Jackson 11'; Russell-Rowe 26'; Zawadzki (yellow card) 36'	Report	Guboglo (yellow card) 17'; Waterman (yellow card) 30'; Owusu 50'; Clark (yellow card) 66'; Petrasso (yellow card) 89'; Piette (yellow card) 90+4'	Stadium: Lower.com Field; Attendance: 19,671; Referee: Alexis Da Silva

April 12 8	CF Montréal	0–1	Charlotte FC	Montreal, QC
7:30 PM EDT	Loturi (yellow card) 35'; Clark (yellow card) 39'; Owusu (yellow card) 60'; Álvarez (yellow card) 89'	Report	Biel 16'; Agyemang (yellow card) 63'	Stadium: Saputo Stadium; Attendance: 16,038; Referee: Rubiel Vazquez

April 19 9	CF Montréal	0–0	Orlando City SC	Montreal, QC
7:30 PM EDT	Campbell (yellow card) 38'; Clark (yellow card) 90'	Report	Smith (yellow card) 3'; Santos (yellow card) 60' (yellow-red card) 76'	Stadium: Saputo Stadium; Attendance: 16,102; Referee: Fotis Bazakos

April 26 10	New York Red Bulls	1–0	CF Montréal	Harrison, NJ
4:30 PM EDT	Eile (yellow card) 28', (goal) 67'; Valencia (yellow card) 85'; Ngoma (yellow card) 87'; Carballo (yellow card) 88'	Report	Saliba (yellow card) 55'	Stadium: Sports Illustrated Stadium; Attendance: 20,108; Referee: Tori Penso

May 3 11	CF Montréal	1–2	Philadelphia Union	Montreal, QC
7:30 PM EDT	Herbers (yellow card) 28'; Pearce (yellow card) 36'; Vrioni 45+3'; Campbell (yellow card) 56'; Sealy (yellow card) 83'	Report	Vassilev 2'; Lukić (yellow card) 58'; Harriel (yellow card) 76'; Sullivan (yellow card) 82'; Uhre 84'	Stadium: Saputo Stadium; Attendance: 17,011; Referee: Marcos de Oliveira

May 10 12	New York City FC	0–1	CF Montréal	New York, NY
7:30 PM EDT	Haak (yellow card) 44'; Ilenič (yellow card) 90'	Report	Piette (yellow card) 39'; Owusu 48'; Waterman (yellow card) 87'	Stadium: Yankee Stadium; Attendance: 19,679; Referee: Chris Penso

May 14 13	CF Montréal	1–1	Columbus Crew	Montreal, QC
7:30 PM EDT	Petrasso 29'; Waterman (yellow card) 86'	Report	Russell-Rowe 63'	Stadium: Saputo Stadium; Attendance: 16,041; Referee: Allen Chapman

May 17 14	CF Montréal	1–6	Toronto FC	Montreal, QC
2:30 PM EDT	Waterman (red card) 21'; Álvarez (yellow card) 45+4'; Neal (yellow card) 57'; Vrioni 64'; Sealy (yellow card) 88'	Report	Thompson (yellow card) 9'; Spicer 14'; Bernardeschi 30', 55'; Brynhildsen 33'; Corbeanu 66', 90+1'	Stadium: Saputo Stadium; Attendance: 16,008; Referee: Filip Dujic

May 24 15	CF Montréal	2–2	Los Angeles FC	Montreal, QC
7:30 PM EDT	Vrioni 5'; Owusu 22' (pen.); Saliba (yellow card) 25'; Piette (yellow card) 69'	Report	Delgado 38', (yellow card) 83'; Giroud 77'	Stadium: Saputo Stadium; Attendance: 15,133; Referee: Rubiel Vazquez

May 28 16	Inter Miami CF	4–2	CF Montréal	Fort Lauderdale, FL
7:30 PM EDT	Messi 27', 87'; Busquets (yellow card) 42'; Segovia (yellow card) 54'; Martínez (yellow card) 61'; Suárez 68', 71'	Report	Campbell (yellow card) 58'; Sealy 74'; Loturi 90+2'	Stadium: Chase Stadium; Attendance: 20,005; Referee: Jon Freemon

May 31 17	CF Montréal	0–3	New England Revolution	Montreal, QC
7:30 PM EDT	Petrasso (yellow card) 15'; Vrioni (red card) 36'; Saliba (yellow card) 51'; Waterman (yellow card) 77'	Report	Yusuf (yellow card) 19'; Miller 48'; Feingold 55', 87'; Polster (yellow card) 59'	Stadium: Saputo Stadium; Attendance: 15,978; Referee: Michael Venne

June 14 18	Houston Dynamo FC	1–3	CF Montréal	Houston, TX
8:30 PM EDT	Lingr (yellow card) 40', (goal) 64'; Ortiz (yellow card) 48'; Holmes (yellow card) 90+8'	Report	Owusu 30', 32'; Neal 54'; Campbell (yellow card) 68'; Bugaj (yellow card) 74'	Stadium: Shell Energy Stadium; Attendance: 17,845; Referee: Lorenzo Hernandez

June 25 19	CF Montréal	1–3	FC Cincinnati	Montreal, QC
7:30 PM EDT	Clark (yellow card) 20'; Sealy (yellow card) 58'; Owusu 90'; Bugaj (yellow card) 90+3'	Report	Evander 45', 83'; Orellano 65'	Stadium: Saputo Stadium; Attendance: 15,012; Referee: Ricardo Montero

June 28 20	CF Montréal	1–0	New York City FC	Montreal, QC
7:30 PM EDT	Loturi 23'	Report	Perea (yellow card) 37'; Moralez (yellow card) 56'; Gray (yellow card) 90+4'	Stadium: Saputo Stadium; Attendance: 17,070; Referee: Victor Rivas

July 5 21	CF Montréal	1–4	Inter Miami CF	Montreal, QC
7:30 PM EDT	Owusu 2'; Álvarez (yellow card) 45+2'	Report	Allende 33'; Messi 40', 62'; Busquets (yellow card) 54'; Segovia 60'; Martínez (yellow card) 88'	Stadium: Saputo Stadium; Attendance: 19,619; Referee: Marcos de Oliveira

July 12 22	Orlando City SC	1–1	CF Montréal	Orlando, FL
7:30 PM EDT	Ojeda 28'; Enrique (yellow card) 48'; Schlegel (yellow card) 53'; Freeman (yellow card) 67'; Brekalo (yellow card) 74'	Report	Waterman (yellow card) 45+4'; Owusu (yellow card) 62', (goal) 83' (pen.); Sealy (yellow card) 90+3'	Stadium: Inter&Co Stadium; Attendance: 20,323; Referee: Ramy Touchan

July 16 23	Philadelphia Union	2–1	CF Montréal	Chester, PA
7:30 PM EDT	Glesnes (yellow card) 21'; Baribo 37'; Q. Sullivan (yellow card) 42'; Makyanhya 50'	Report	Loturi (yellow card) 41'; Owusu 45+2'; Craig (yellow card) 72'	Stadium: Subaru Park; Attendance: 16,001; Referee: Guido Gonzales Jr.

July 19 24	CF Montréal	0–2	Chicago Fire FC	Montreal, QC
7:30 PM EDT	Herbers (yellow card) 27'; Pearce (yellow card) 57'; Waterman (yellow card) 71'; Loturi (yellow card) 87'	Report	Cuypers 13'; Pineda (yellow card) 32'; Rogers (yellow card) 36'; Elliott 54'; Kouamé (yellow card) 66'	Stadium: Saputo Stadium; Attendance: 16,218; Referee: Jon Freemon

July 25 25	New England Revolution	1–3	CF Montréal	Foxborough, MA
7:30 PM EDT	Chancalay 3', (yellow card) 90+1'; Langoni (yellow card) 30'; Gil (yellow card) 73'; Polster (yellow card) 80'; Urruti (yellow card) 90+3'	Report	Owusu 9'; Sealy 36'; Waterman (yellow card) 73'; Escobar (yellow card) 88', (goal) 90+5'	Stadium: Gillette Stadium; Attendance: 17,992; Referee: Chris Penso

August 9 26	CF Montréal	1–1	Atlanta United FC	Montreal, QC
7:30 PM EDT	Morales (yellow card) 10'; Sealy 40'; Owusu (yellow card) 59'	Report	Lennon (yellow card) 44'; Hernández (yellow card) 58'; Williams (yellow card) 79'; Miranchuk 87'	Stadium: Saputo Stadium; Attendance: 16,029; Referee: Rosendo Mendoza

August 16 27	CF Montréal	1–1	D.C. United	Montreal, QC
7:30 PM EDT	Petrasso 41'; Morales (yellow card) 53'; Craig (yellow card) 63'	Report	Hopkins 28'; Peltola (yellow card) 32'; Servania (yellow card) 39'; Benteke (yellow card) 42'; Enow (yellow card) 70'	Stadium: Saputo Stadium; Attendance: 15,606; Referee: Lorenzo Hernandez

August 23 28	CF Montréal	3–2	Austin FC	Montreal, QC
7:30 PM EDT	Synchuk 9', (yellow card) 61'; Bugaj (yellow card) 31'; Sealy 45+3'; Owusu 67' (pen.); Gillier (yellow card) 78'; Loturi (yellow card) 78'; Duke (yellow card) 90+4'; Breza (yellow card) 90+6'	Report	Wolff (yellow card) 31', (goal) 77'; Uzuni 40'; Hines-Ike (yellow card) 66'	Stadium: Saputo Stadium; Attendance: 15,221; Referee: Allen Chapman

August 30 29	Toronto FC	1–1	CF Montréal	Toronto, ON
7:30 PM EDT	Dominguez (yellow card) 36'; Long (yellow card) 50'; Vilsaint (yellow card) 86'; Osorio 89'	Report	Synchuk (yellow card) 10'; Petrasso (yellow card) 32'; Owusu (yellow card) 40'; Sealy 84'; Gillier (yellow card) 87'	Stadium: BMO Field; Attendance: 27,076; Referee: Drew Fischer

September 13 30	CF Montréal	0–2	St. Louis City SC	Montreal, QC
7:30 PM EDT	Piette (yellow card) 51'; Loturi (yellow card) 85'	Report	Wallem 11'; Durkin (yellow card) 18'; Hartel 55'	Stadium: Saputo Stadium; Attendance: 15,316; Referee: Ismir Pekmic

September 20 31	CF Montréal	0–2	New York Red Bulls	Montreal, QC
7:30 PM EDT		Report	Parker 23', (yellow card) 45+3'; Choupo-Moting 29'; Eile (yellow card) 45+3'; S. Nealis (yellow card) 62'	Stadium: Saputo Stadium; Attendance: 16,076; Referee: Filip Dujic

September 27 32	Charlotte FC	1–4	CF Montréal	Charlotte, NC
7:30 PM EDT	Zaha 10'; Malanda (red card) 20'; Westwood (yellow card) 70'; Toklomati (yellow card) 73'; Bronico (yellow card) 83'; Ream (yellow card) 90+7'	Report	Sealy 41', 86'; Herbers 53'; Hidalgo (yellow card) 80'; Owusu 90'	Stadium: Bank of America Stadium; Attendance: 28,841; Referee: Ricardo Montero

October 4 33	CF Montréal	1–1	Nashville SC	Montreal, QC
2:30 PM EDT	Sealy 9'; Jamie (yellow card) 64'	Report	Maher (yellow card) 8'; Lovitz (yellow card) 69'; Nájar (yellow card) 73'; Surridge 81'	Stadium: Saputo Stadium; Attendance: 16,244; Referee: Fotis Bazakos

October 18 34	FC Cincinnati	3–0	CF Montréal	Cincinnati, OH
6:00 PM EDT	Hagglund 33', (yellow card) 45+4'; Evander 56'; Gidi (yellow card) 61'; Brenner 88'		Loturi (yellow card) 29'; Sealy (yellow card) 42'	Stadium: TQL Stadium; Referee: Timothy Ford

== Leagues Cup ==
=== Group Stage ===
July 29 Group Stage	CF Montréal (Canada)	1–1 (7–6 p)	(Mexico) León	Montreal, QC
7:00 PM EDT	Owusu 62'; Escobar (yellow card) 90+1'	Report	Funes Mori 11'; Jiménez (yellow card) 81'; Rodríguez (yellow card) 90+1'	Stadium: Saputo Stadium; Attendance: 14,272; Referee: Pierre-Luc Lauziere
	Penalties
	Waterman (penalty scored); Craig (penalty scored); Duke (penalty scored); Escobar (penalty scored); Owusu (penalty scored); Petrasso (penalty scored); Pearce (penalty scored)		(penalty scored) Rodríguez; (penalty scored) Frías; (penalty scored) Rigoni; (penalty scored) Ayón; (penalty scored) Echeverría; (penalty scored) Gauthier; (penalty missed) Santos

August 1 Group Stage	Toluca (Mexico)	2–1	(Canada) CF Montréal	Harrison, NJ
9:00 PM EDT	Angulo 23'; Paulinho 26'	Report	Morales 20'; Waterman (yellow card) 55'; Graham-Roache (yellow card) 90+6'; Álvarez (red card) 90+7'	Stadium: Sports Illustrated Stadium; Attendance: 12,149; Referee: José Raúl Torres

August 5 Group Stage	CF Montréal (Canada)	1–2	(Mexico) Puebla	Montreal, QC
8:00 PM EDT	Waterman (red card) 23'; Sealy (yellow card) 28'; Morales (yellow card) 36'; Owusu 47'; Loturi (yellow card) 50'; Craig (yellow card) 52'	Report	Gomez 58'; Lozano (yellow card) 64'; Marín 73'; Castillo (yellow card) 89' (yellow-red card) 90+2'; Monárrez (yellow card) 89'	Stadium: Saputo Stadium; Attendance: 9,368; Referee: Adonai Gonzalez

== Canadian Championship ==
=== Bracket ===
- Preliminary round
- single match

- Quarter-finals
- two-legged tie

- Semi-finals
- two-legged tie

- Final
- single match

Vancouver Whitecaps FC
2
2
4

Winnipeg, MB

Valour FC
2
1
3

Valour FC
1

TSS FC Rovers
0

Vancouver Whitecaps FC
2
4
6

Toronto, ON

Forge FC
2
0
2

Toronto FC
2 (2)

CF Montréal (p)
2 (3)

CF Montréal
0
2
2

Hamilton, ON

Forge FC
1
2
3

Forge FC
3

Vancouver, BC

HFX Wanderers FC
1

Vancouver Whitecaps FC
4

Ottawa, ON

Vancouver FC
2

Atlético Ottawa
2

Scrosoppi FC
0

Atlético Ottawa
2
4
6

Toronto, ON

York United FC
1
3
4

York United FC
5

FC Laval
0

Atlético Ottawa
1
1
2

Langford, BC

Vancouver FC
3
0
3

Pacific FC
1 (2)

Vancouver FC (p)
1 (4)

Vancouver FC (p)
1
1
2 (5)

Foothills County, AB

Cavalry FC
1
1
2 (4)

Cavalry FC
6

Edmonton Scottish
0

=== Preliminary round ===
April 30 Preliminary round	Toronto FC	2–2 (2–3 p)	CF Montréal	Toronto, ON
7:00 PM EDT	Corbeanu 30'; Coello (yellow card) 38'; Gomis (yellow card) 45+3'; Spicer 74'; Dominguez (yellow card) 79'		Loturi (yellow card) 43'; Waterman 70'; Vrioni 89'	Stadium: BMO Field; Attendance: 20,265; Referee: Michael Venne
	Penalties
	Spicer (penalty missed); Franklin (penalty scored); Coello (penalty scored); Corbeanu (penalty missed); Brynhildsen (penalty missed)		(penalty scored) Waterman; (penalty scored) Sealy; (penalty scored) Iankov; (penalty missed) Pearce

=== Quarterfinals ===
May 20 Quarterfinals	Forge FC	1–0	CF Montréal	Hamilton, Ontario
7:00 PM EDT	Owolabi-Belewu (yellow card) 24'; Achinioti-Jönsson (yellow card) 35'; Wright (yellow card) 68', (goal) 78'; Jensen (yellow card) 90+5'	Report	Waterman (yellow card) 43'; Owusu (yellow card) 66'; Piette (yellow card) 68'; Craig (yellow card) 90+1'	Stadium: Hamilton Stadium; Attendance: 3,064; Referee: Ben Hoskins

July 9 Quarterfinals	CF Montréal	2–2	Forge FC	Montreal, QC
7:00 PM EDT	Owusu (yellow card) 36', (goal) 58', 90+5'	Report	Jevremović (yellow card) 45'; Borges (yellow card) 65', (goal) 79'; Bekker 82'	Stadium: Saputo Stadium; Attendance: 13,125; Referee: Renzo Villanueva
Note: Forge FC won 3–2 on aggregate.

== Statistics ==
=== Appearances, minutes played, and goals scored ===
No.	Nat.	Player	Total			Major League Soccer			Canadian Championship			Leagues Cup			MLS Cup Playoffs			Ref.
No.	Nat.	Player	App.	Min.	Gls	App.	Min.	Gls	App.	Min.	Gls	App.	Min.	Gls	App.	Min.	Gls	Ref.
Goalkeepers
1	(Canada)	Sebastian Breza	3	270	0	3	270	0	0	0	0	0	0	0	0	0	0	
31	(Chile)	Thomas Gillier	9	810	0	8	720	0	0	0	0	1	90	0	0	0	0	
40	(Canada)	Jonathan Sirois	28	2520	0	23	2070	0	3	270	0	2	180	0	0	0	0	
Defenders
2	(United States)	Jalen Neal	14	956	1	14	956	1	0	0	0	0	0	0	0	0	0	
3	(England)	Tom Pearce	25	1082	0	21	911	0	3	160	0	1	11	0	0	0	0	
4	(Colombia)	Fernando Álvarez	25	1358	0	22	1088	0	1	90	0	2	180	0	0	0	0	
5	(United States)	Brandan Craig	29	1804	0	24	1430	0	2	180	0	3	194	0	0	0	0	
13	(Canada)	Luca Petrasso	39	3104	2	34	2715	2	2	175	0	3	214	0	0	0	0	
19	(United States)	Bode Hidalgo	6	349	0	6	349	0	0	0	0	0	0	0	0	0	0	
24	(Bolivia)	Efrain Morales	8	664	1	6	484	0	0	0	0	2	180	1	0	0	0	
25	(Trinidad and Tobago)	Dante Sealy	36	2761	9	30	2426	9	3	165	0	3	170	0	0	0	0	
27	(Poland)	Dawid Bugaj	29	2133	0	23	1731	0	3	215	0	3	187	0	0	0	0	
39	(Canada)	Aleksandr Guboglo	27	1196	0	23	1003	0	1	72	0	3	121	0	0	0	0	
Midfielders
6	(Canada)	Samuel Piette	30	1869	0	24	1547	0	3	162	0	3	160	0	0	0	0	
8	(England)	Matty Longstaff	8	584	0	8	584	0	0	0	0	0	0	0	0	0	0	
10	(United States)	Bryce Duke	21	776	0	18	675	0	1	45	0	2	56	0	0	0	0	
11	(Spain)	Iván Jaime	6	307	0	6	307	0	0	0	0	0	0	0	0	0	0	
18	(Ukraine)	Hennadiy Synchuk	19	1074	1	14	797	1	2	90	0	3	187	0	0	0	0	
21	(Germany)	Fabian Herbers	16	724	1	16	724	1	0	0	0	0	0	0	0	0	0	
22	(Canada)	Victor Loturi	40	2998	1	34	2503	2	3	270	0	3	225	0	0	0	0	
29	(Guatemala)	Olger Escobar	16	536	1	13	446	1	0	0	0	3	90	0	0	0	0	
Forwards
7	(Ghana)	Kwadwo Opoku	10	248	0	9	188	0	1	60	0	0	0	0	0	0	0	
9	(Germany)	Prince Owusu	40	3287	17	34	2825	13	3	219	2	3	243	2	0	0	0	
14	(Nigeria)	Sunusi Ibrahim	10	70	0	10	70	0	0	0	0	0	0	0	0	0	0	
17	(Albania)	Giacomo Vrioni	10	444	4	9	411	3	1	33	1	0	0	0	0	0	0	
35	(Canada)	Owen Graham-Roache	11	185	0	6	120	0	3	32	0	2	33	0	0	0	0	
No Longer with the Club
8	(Bulgaria)	Dominik Yankov	4	50	0	3	29	0	1	21	0	0	0	0	0	0	0	
11	(Canada)	Jahkeele Marshall-Rutty	6	228	0	6	228	0	0	0	0	0	0	0	0	0	0	
15	(United States)	Ousman Jabang	1	89	0	1	89	0	0	0	0	0	0	0	0	0	0	
16	(Canada)	Joel Waterman	23	1898	1	18	1439	0	3	270	1	3	189	0	0	0	0	
19	(Canada)	Nathan Saliba	18	1399	1	16	1264	1	2	135	0	0	0	0	0	0	0	
23	(United States)	Caden Clark	30	1910	0	26	1571	0	2	146	0	3	193	0	0	0	0	
24	(United States)	George Campbell	18	1465	0	16	1348	0	2	117	0	0	0	0	0	0	0	
28	(Canada)	Jules-Anthony Vilsaint	11	262	0	9	219	0	1	25	0	0	0	0	1	18	0	
Last updated: October 28, 2025

=== Top scorers ===
Rank	Nat.	Player	Pos.	MLS	Canadian Championship	Leagues Cup	MLS Cup Playoffs	TOTAL
1	(Germany)	Prince Owusu	FW	13	2	2		17
2	(Trinidad and Tobago)	Dante Sealy	DF	9				9
3	(Albania)	Giacomo Vrioni	FW	3	1			4
4	(Canada)	Victor Loturi	MF	2				2
4	(Canada)	Luca Petrasso	DF	2				2
6	(Canada)	Nathan Saliba	MF	1				1
6	(United States)	Jalen Neal	DF	1				1
6	(Guatemala)	Olger Escobar	MF	1				1
6	(Ukraine)	Hennadiy Synchuk	MF	1				1
6	(Germany)	Fabian Herbers	MF	1				1
6	(Canada)	Joel Waterman	DF		1			1
6	(Bolivia)	Efrain Morales	DF			1		1
Totals				34	4	3	0	41

Updated to match played October 28, 2025
Italic: denotes player left the club during the season.

=== Top assists ===
Rank	Nat.	Player	Pos.	MLS	Canadian Championship	Leagues Cup	MLS Cup Playoffs	TOTAL
1	(United States)	Caden Clark	MF	6		1		7
2	(Germany)	Prince Owusu	FW	5				5
2	(Canada)	Luca Petrasso	DF	4	1			5
4	(England)	Tom Pearce	DF	3	1			4
5	(Trinidad and Tobago)	Dante Sealy	DF	2		1		3
6	(Poland)	Dawid Bugaj	DF	2				2
6	(Canada)	Victor Loturi	MF	2				2
6	(United States)	Bryce Duke	MF	2				2
9	(Germany)	Fabian Herbers	MF	1				1
9	(Colombia)	Fernando Álvarez	DF	1				1
9	(Canada)	Aleksandr Guboglo	DF	1				1
9	(Spain)	Iván Jaime	FW	1				1
9	(England)	Matty Longstaff	MF	1				1
9	(Guatemala)	Olger Escobar	MF	1				1
9	(Canada)	Jules-Anthony Vilsaint	FW	1				1
9	(Canada)	Joel Waterman	DF	1				1
9	(Canada)	Nathan Saliba	MF	1				1
9	(United States)	George Campbell	DF	1				1
9	(Canada)	Owen Graham-Roache	FW		1			1
9	(Ukraine)	Hennadiy Synchuk	MF			1		1
Totals				36	3	3	0	42

Updated to match played October 31, 2025
Italic: denotes player left the club during the season.

=== Goals against average ===
No.	Nat.	Player	Total			Major League Soccer			Canadian Championship			Leagues Cup			MLS Cup Playoffs		
No.	Nat.	Player	MIN	GA	GAA	MIN	GA	GAA	MIN	GA	GAA	MIN	GA	GAA	MIN	GA	GAA
1	CAN	Sebastian Breza	270	9	3.00	270	9	3.00	0	0	0.00	0	0	0.00	0	0	0.00
31	CHI	Thomas Gillier	810	14	1.56	720	12	1.50	0	0	0.00	90	2	2.00	0	0	0.00
33	CAN	Emil Gazdov	0	0	0.00	0	0	0.00	0	0	0.00	0	0	0.00	0	0	0.00
40	CAN	Jonathan Sirois	2520	44	1.57	2070	36	1.57	270	5	1.67	180	3	1.50	0	0	0.00

Updated to match played October 28, 2025
Source: CF Montréal
Italic: denotes player left the club during the season.

=== Clean sheets ===
No.	Nat.	Player	MLS	Canadian Championship	Leagues Cup	MLS Cup Playoffs	TOTAL
1	(Canada)	Sebastian Breza					0
33	(Canada)	Emil Gazdov					0
40	(Canada)	Jonathan Sirois	4				4
Totals			4	0	0	0	4

Updated to match played June 30, 2025
Source: MLSsoccer.com
Italic: denotes player left the club during the season.

=== Top minutes played ===
No.	Nat.	Player	Pos.	MLS	Canadian Championship	Leagues Cup	MLS Cup Playoffs	TOTAL
9	(Germany)	Prince Owusu	FW	2825	219	243	0	3287
13	(Canada)	Luca Petrasso	DF	2715	175	214	0	3104
22	(Canada)	Victor Loturi	MF	2503	270	225	0	2998
25	(Trinidad and Tobago)	Dante Sealy	DF	2426	165	170	0	2761
40	(Canada)	Jonathan Sirois	GK	2070	270	180	0	2520
27	(Poland)	Dawid Bugaj	DF	1731	215	187	0	2133
23	(United States)	Caden Clark	MF	1571	146	193	0	1910
16	(Canada)	Joel Waterman	DF	1439	270	189	0	1898
6	(Canada)	Samuel Piette	MF	1547	162	160	0	1869
5	(United States)	Brandan Craig	DF	1430	180	194	0	1804

Updated to match played October 28, 2025
Source: Montreal Impact
Italic: denotes player left the club during the season.

=== Yellow and red cards ===
No.	Player	Total			Major League Soccer			Canadian Championship			Leagues Cup			Ref.
No.	Player	Yellow card	(yellow card) (red card)	Red card	Yellow card	(yellow card) (red card)	Red card	Yellow card	(yellow card) (red card)	Red card	Yellow card	(yellow card) (red card)	Red card	Ref.
1	Sebastian Breza	1	0	0	1	0	0	0	0	0	0	0	0	
2	Jalen Neal	1	0	0	1	0	0	0	0	0	0	0	0	
3	Tom Pearce	2	0	0	2	0	0	0	0	0	0	0	0	
4	Fernando Álvarez	4	0	1	4	0	0	0	0	0	0	0	1	
5	Brandan Craig	5	0	0	3	0	0	1	0	0	1	0	0	
6	Samuel Piette	5	0	0	4	0	0	1	0	0	0	0	0	
7	Kwadwo Opoku	1	0	0	1	0	0	0	0	0	0	0	0	
8	Matty Longstaff	0	0	0	0	0	0	0	0	0	0	0	0	
9	Prince Owusu	6	0	0	4	0	0	2	0	0	0	0	0	
10	Bryce Duke	1	0	0	1	0	0	0	0	0	0	0	0	
11	Iván Jaime	1	0	0	1	0	0	0	0	0	0	0	0	
13	Luca Petrasso	4	0	0	4	0	0	0	0	0	0	0	0	
14	Sunusi Ibrahim	0	0	0	0	0	0	0	0	0	0	0	0	
17	Giacomo Vrioni	0	0	1	0	0	1	0	0	0	0	0	0	
18	Hennadiy Synchuk	2	0	0	2	0	0	0	0	0	0	0	0	
19	Bode Hidalgo	1	0	0	1	0	0	0	0	0	0	0	0	
21	Fabian Herbers	3	0	0	3	0	0	0	0	0	0	0	0	
22	Victor Loturi	9	0	0	7	0	0	1	0	0	1	0	0	
24	Efrain Morales	3	0	0	2	0	0	0	0	0	1	0	0	
25	Dante Sealy	7	0	0	6	0	0	0	0	0	1	0	0	
27	Dawid Bugaj	4	0	0	4	0	0	0	0	0	0	0	0	
29	Olger Escobar	2	0	0	1	0	0	0	0	0	1	0	0	
31	Thomas Gillier	2	0	0	2	0	0	0	0	0	0	0	0	
33	Emil Gazdov	0	0	0	0	0	0	0	0	0	0	0	0	
35	Owen Graham-Roache	1	0	0	0	0	0	0	0	0	1	0	0	
39	Aleksandr Guboglo	1	0	0	1	0	0	0	0	0	0	0	0	
40	Jonathan Sirois	0	0	0	0	0	0	0	0	0	0	0	0	
	Ousman Jabang	1	0	0	1	0	0	0	0	0	0	0	0	
	Nathan Saliba	5	0	0	5	0	0	0	0	0	0	0	0	
	George Campbell	3	0	0	3	0	0	0	0	0	0	0	0	
	Joel Waterman	10	0	2	8	0	1	1	0	0	1	0	1	
	Caden Clark	6	0	0	6	0	0	0	0	0	0	0	0	
	Jahkeele Marshall-Rutty	1	0	0	1	0	0	0	0	0	0	0	0	
Totals		90	0	4	77	0	2	6	0	0	5	0	2	
Last updated: October 28, 2025

== Recognition ==
=== MLS team of the Week ===
Week	Player	Nation	Position	Report
4	Sirois	Canada	BN	MLS team of the Week: 4
6	Campbell	United States	DF	MLS team of the Week: 6
12	Owusu	Germany	FW	MLS team of the Week: 12
13	Petrasso	Canada	BN	MLS team of the Week: 13
19	Owusu	Germany	FW	MLS team of the Week: 19
19	Neal	United States	DF	MLS team of the Week: 19
21	Loturi	Canada	BN	MLS team of the Week: 21
29	Petrasso	Canada	BN	MLS team of the Week: 29
30	Owusu	Germany	BN	MLS team of the Week: 30
37	Sealy	Trinidad and Tobago	MF	MLS team of the Week: 37
