= Victor Loturi =

Canadian soccer player (born 2001)

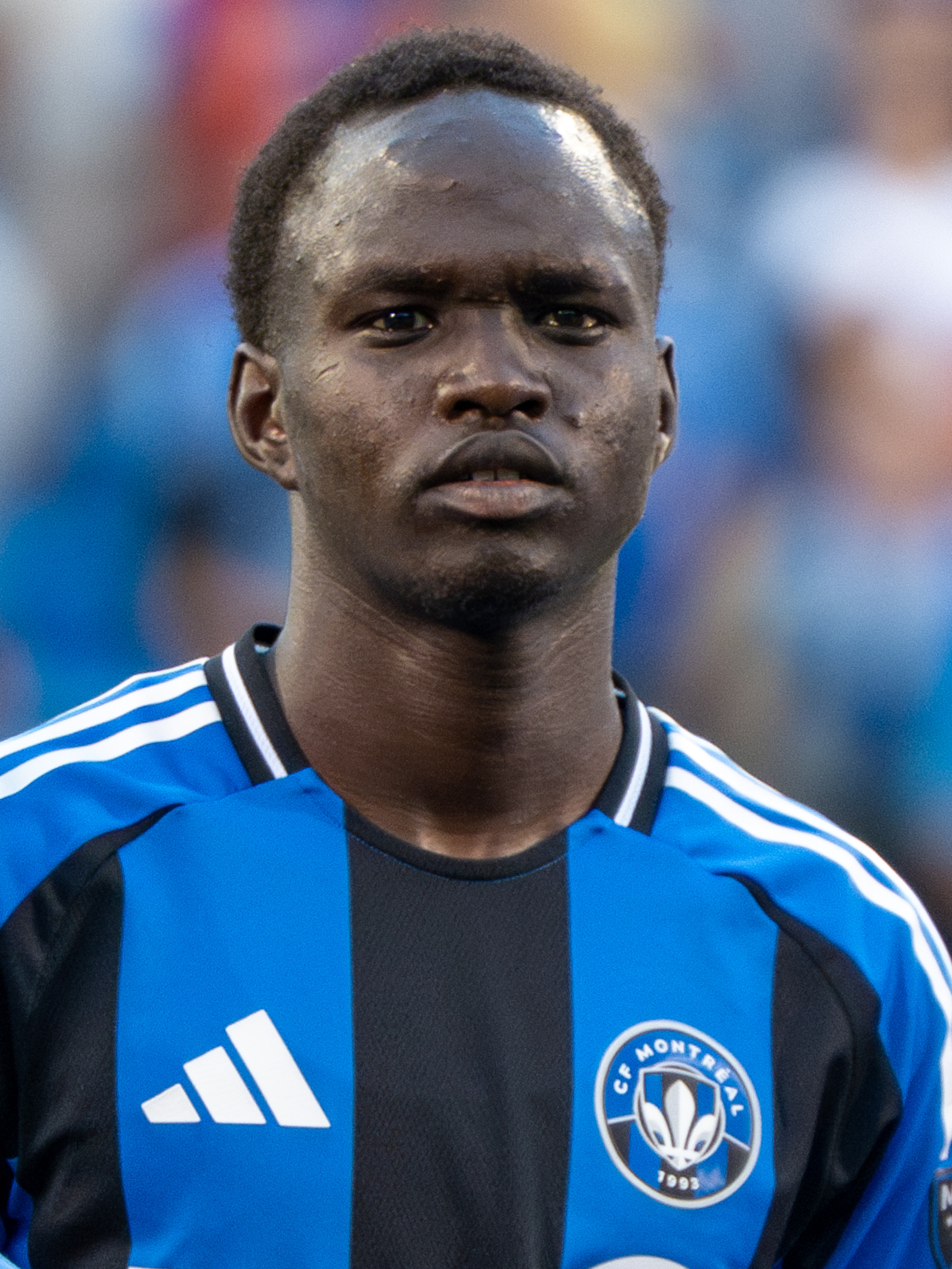
- Loturi with CF Montréal in 2025

Personal information
- Full name: Victor Lokai Loturi
- Date of birth: May 21, 2001 (age 25)
- Place of birth: Calgary, Alberta, Canada
- Height: 1.73 m (5 ft 8 in)
- Position: Midfielder

Team information
- Current team: CF Montréal
- Number: 22

Youth career
- 2010–2018: Calgary Northside
- 2018–2019: Calgary Foothills

Senior career*
Years	Team	Apps	(Gls)
2019	Cavalry FC	2	(0)
2020	Calgary Foothills	0	(0)
2021–2022	Cavalry FC	37	(2)
2022–2025	Ross County	66	(1)
2025–	CF Montréal	65	(3)

International career^{‡}
2023–	Canada	1	(0)
- * Club domestic league appearances and goals as of November 7, 2026 ‡ National team caps and goals as of July 4, 2023

Victor Lokai Loturi (born May 21, 2001) is a Canadian professional soccer player who plays as a midfielder for Major League Soccer club CF Montréal and the Canada national team.

== Club career ==
=== Early career ===
Loturi began playing organized soccer at age nine with local club Calgary Northside SC, where he played until 2018. In 2017, he represented Alberta at the 2017 Canada Summer Games. In winter 2018, Loturi joined the Calgary Foothills FC Generation Program.

=== Cavalry FC ===
Loturi signed with Canadian Premier League club Cavalry FC on April 17, 2019, he was the club's youngest player that season. He made his debut on May 15 against Pacific FC in a Canadian Championship match. On July 1, 2019, Loturi made his league debut for Cavalry in a 3–1 loss to Pacific FC.

=== Mount Royal and Calgary Foothills ===
After departing Cavalry FC, Victor Loturi attended Mount Royal University where his U Sports season was ended due to the COVID-19 pandemic. He had also been expected to play for his former youth club Calgary Foothills in USL League Two until the season was also cancelled due to the pandemic.

=== Return to Cavalry FC ===
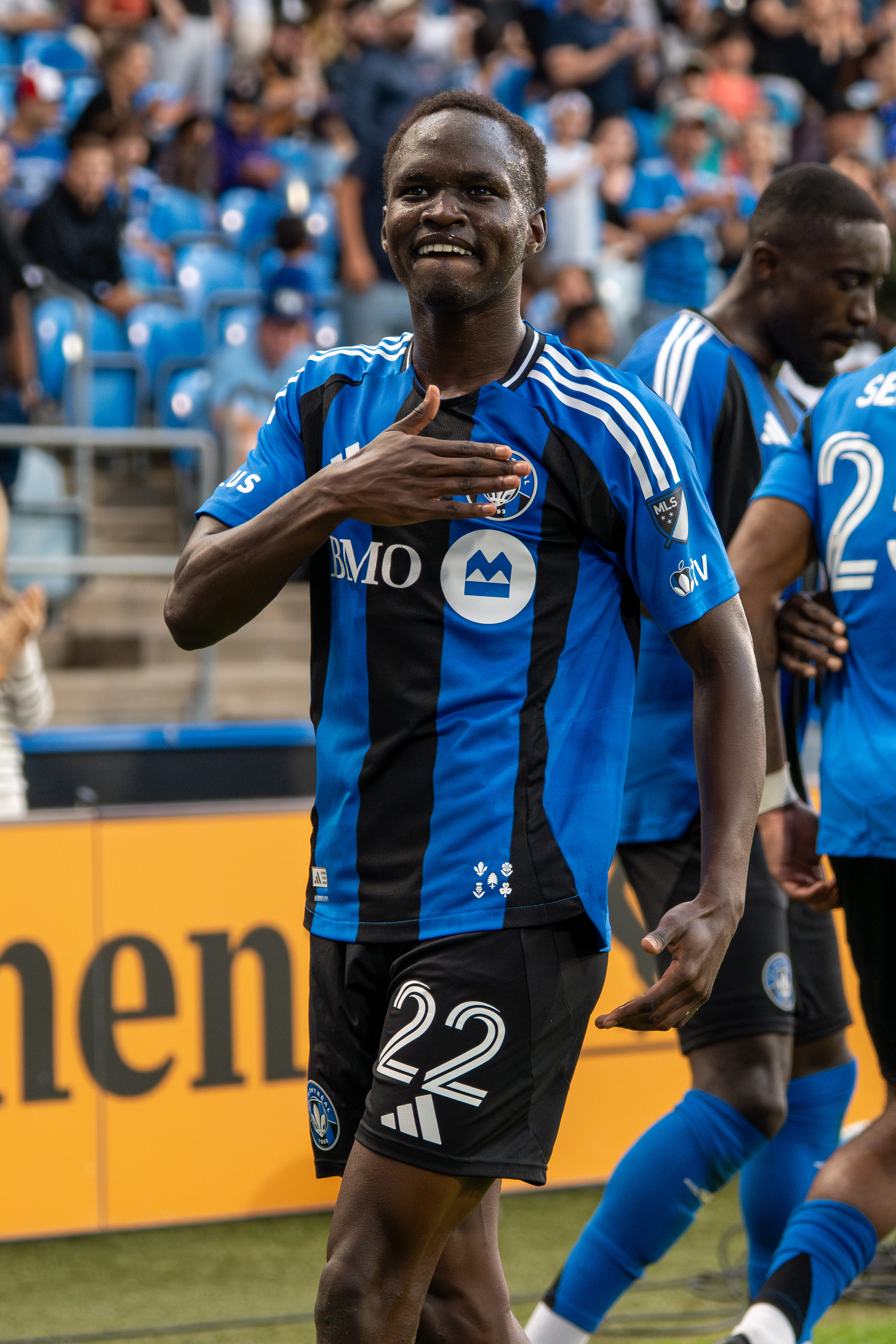
Victor Loturi in 2025

After attending Mount Royal University for a year, Loturi was drafted by Cavalry FC in the 2021 CPL–U Sports Draft and was ultimately re-signed by the club on a developmental contract on June 18, 2021. Unlike in his first stint, now Loturi was a key player for Cavalry, appearing in all but two of the clubs matches. Cavalry finished in second place in the regular season, but in the playoffs were defeated in semifinals. At the end of the season, Loturi was nominated for Best U-21 Canadian of the Year award, but did not win it.

In January 2022, Cavalry announced that they had re-signed Loturi for the 2022 and 2023 seasons, with an option for 2024. On June 16, 2022 Loturi was named to CPL's Gatorade Team of the Week for Week 10.

=== Ross County ===
On June 21, 2022, Cavalry FC announced that Loturi had been transferred to Scottish Premiership side Ross County on a six-figure transfer fee, with Cavalry retaining a sell-on clause. On July 16, he made his debut for Ross County, coming on as a substitute for Yan Dhanda in a Scottish League Cup match against Dunfermline Athletic. Loturi scored his first goal for the Staggies on July 23, netting the opener in a 7-0 win over East Fife in the Scottish League Cup.

=== CF Montréal ===
On January 28, 2025, Loturi moved to Major League Soccer club CF Montréal on a free transfer, signing a two-year contract with the club, with options for the 2027 and 2028 seasons. Following the 2025 season, Loturi was named the team's Defensive Player of the Year.

== International career ==
Loturi is eligible for Canada through his birth in Calgary and South Sudan through his parents. Initially named to South Sudan's provisional squad for 2023 AFCON qualification matches in March 2023, that same week Loturi accepted a call-up to Canada's squad for CONCACAF Nations League matches against Curaçao and Honduras. In June 2023 he was named to Canada's final squad contesting the 2023 CONCACAF Nations League Finals. He did not make an appearance in the Semi-final or Final as Canada finished runners-up to the United States.

The day after the Nations League Finals on June 19, Loturi was named to the 23-man squad for the 2023 CONCACAF Gold Cup. He made his debut for his country on July 4, in Canada's final group stage match against Cuba.

In May 2024, Loturi was included in the provisional roster for the 2024 Copa América.

== Personal life ==
Born in Canada, Loturi is of South Sudanese descent. His brother William Akio is also a professional soccer player and represents the South Sudan national team.

== Career statistics ==
=== Club ===
As of match played November 7, 2026

Club statistics
Club	Season	League			National Cup		League Cup		Playoffs		Total	
Club	Season	Division	Apps	Goals	Apps	Goals	Apps	Goals	Apps	Goals	Apps	Goals
Cavalry FC	2019	Canadian Premier League	2	0	2	0	—		0	0	4	0
Calgary Foothills	2020	USL League Two	—		—		—		—		0	0
Cavalry FC	2021	Canadian Premier League	27	2	1	0	—		1 (Note: Appearance in Canadian Premier League Play-offs)	0	29	2
Cavalry FC	2022	Canadian Premier League	10	0	2	0	—		0	0	12	0
Cavalry FC	Total		37	2	3	0	0	0	1	0	41	2
Ross County	2022–23	Scottish Premiership	27	0	1	0	3	1	2	0	33	1
Ross County	2023–24	Scottish Premiership	28	1	1	0	5	0	2	0	36	1
Ross County	2024–25	Scottish Premiership	11	0	0	0	5	0	0	0	16	0
Ross County	Total		66	1	2	0	13	1	4	0	85	2
CF Montréal	2025	MLS	34	2	3	0	3	0	0	0	40	2
CF Montréal	2026	MLS	31	1	6	0	0	0	0	0	37	1
CF Montréal	Total		65	3	9	0	3	0	0	0	77	3
Career total			170	6	16	0	16	1	5	0	207	7

=== International ===
As of match played July 4, 2023

Appearances and goals by national team and year
National team	Year	Apps	Goals
Canada	2023	1	0
Total		1	0

== Honours ==
Cavalry

- Canadian Premier League Finals runner-up: 2019
- Canadian Premier League (Regular season): Spring 2019, Fall 2019
