= Luca Petrasso =

Canadian soccer player (born 2000)

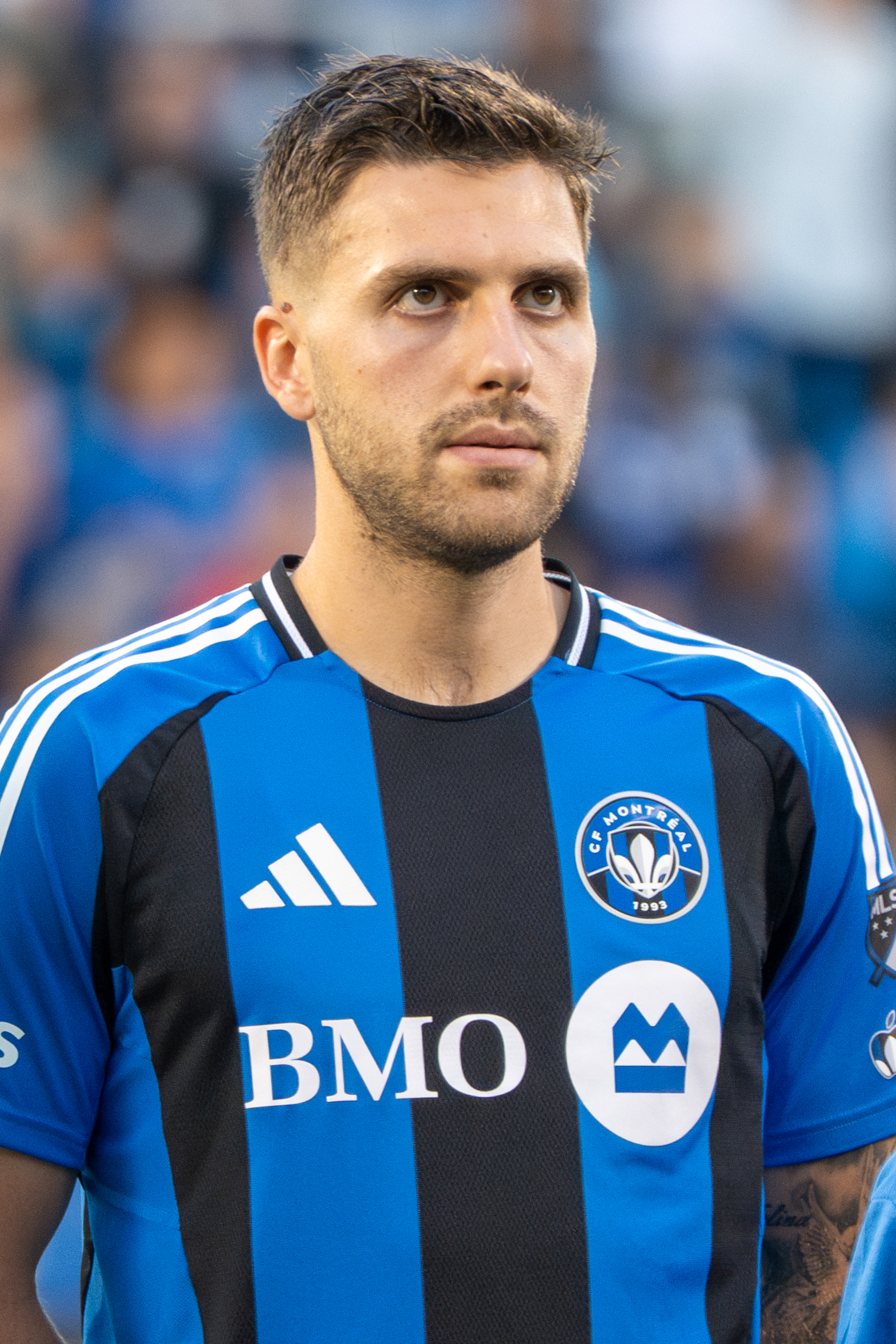
- Petrasso with CF Montréal in 2025

Personal information
- Full name: Luca Allan Petrasso
- Date of birth: June 16, 2000 (age 26)
- Place of birth: North York, Toronto, Ontario, Canada
- Height: 5 ft 11 in (1.80 m)
- Position: Left-back

Team information
- Current team: CF Montréal
- Number: 13

Youth career
- Kleinburg-Nobleton SC
- 2013–2018: Toronto FC

Senior career*
Years	Team	Apps	(Gls)
2018–2021	Toronto FC II	62	(3)
2022	Toronto FC	23	(0)
2023–2024	Orlando City	14	(0)
2023	→ Orlando City B (loan)	1	(0)
2024	→ Triestina (loan)	14	(0)
2024	→ Orlando City B (loan)	10	(1)
2025–	CF Montréal	64	(2)

International career^{‡}
2017	Canada U17	3	(0)
2026–	Canada	1	(0)
- * Club domestic league appearances and goals as of 00:12, November 8, 2026 (UTC) ‡ National team caps and goals as of 20:34, October 3, 2026 (UTC)

Luca Allan Petrasso (born June 16, 2000) is a Canadian professional soccer player who plays as a left-back for Major League Soccer club CF Montréal and the Canada national team.

== Club career ==
=== Early career ===
Petrasso joined the Toronto FC Academy in 2013, when he was 12. Petrasso joined the Senior Academy team in League1 Ontario in 2016, making his debut on June 4 against ProStars FC, where he scored an 86th minute game-winning goal to win the match 3–2.

On September 23, 2017, he scored four goals in a 5–1 victory over North Mississauga SC.

On March 15, 2018, he signed his first professional contract with Toronto FC II in the second-tier USL. He made his professional debut on April 26 against the Richmond Kickers.

He scored his first professional goal on April 6, 2019, against Orlando City B, which was the club's first goal in USL League One after the club dropped down to the third tier in 2019. He re-signed with the team for the 2021 season.

=== Toronto FC ===
On January 11, 2022, Toronto FC announced they had signed Petrasso to the senior side as a Homegrown Player through 2023. He made his MLS debut on March 5, starting against the New York Red Bulls, recording his first assist on a Jesús Jiménez goal in a 4–1 loss.

=== Orlando City ===
On November 9, 2022, Petrasso was acquired in a trade by Orlando City in exchange for $300,000 in 2023 General Allocation Money, with the potential for an additional $50,000 in 2024 and $50,000 in 2025 should certain conditions be met.

On December 5, 2024, it was announced that the club had allowed Petrasso's contract to expire and they were not interested in pursuing an extension.

==== Loan to Triestina ====
On January 12, 2024, Petrasso joined Serie C club Triestina on loan with an option to buy. Petrasso made his debut for the club when he started in a 2–1 victory over Pro Vercelli on January 20.

In total, during Petrasso's loan spell he made 14 appearances across six months, but the club ultimately did not exercise their option to sign him.

=== CF Montréal ===
On January 13, 2025, CF Montréal announced that Petrasso had been invited to attend a training camp ahead of their 2025 campaign. On February 7, Petrasso signed a one-year contract with the club, with club options for 2026 and 2027. Petrasso made his debut for the club when he started in the opening match of the season in a 3–2 loss to Atlanta United on February 22. On May 14, Petrasso scored his first goal for the club and his first MLS goal in a 1–1 draw with Columbus Crew.

Petrasso scored his second goal for the club to equalize and help CF Montréal to a 1–1 draw with D.C. United on August 16. For his performance against D.C. United, Petrasso was named to the bench of the Team of the Matchday for the first time in his career. At the conclusion of the season, CF Montréal extended Petrasso's contract. On October 21, 2026, Petrasso and CF Montréal lost on penalties 4–2, after regular time ended 1–1, to Canadian Premier League club Forge FC in the final of the 2026 Canadian Championship. CF Montréal had made it to the final of the cup for the first time since winning it in 2021.

== International career ==
In 2017, Petrasso represented the Canada U17 team at the 2017 CONCACAF U-17 Championship.

In May 2023, Petrasso was listed on the Canada preliminary rosters for the 2023 CONCACAF Nations League Finals, and again on February 26, 2024, Petrasso was named to the Canada provisional roster for the 2024 Copa América qualifying play-offs against Trinidad and Tobago.

On October 3, 2026, Petrasso received his first call-up to the national team when he was added to the roster ahead of their match against Peru.

== Personal life ==
Petrasso was born in Canada and is of Italian descent, holding dual citizenship. He is the younger brother of fellow professional soccer player Michael Petrasso.

== Career statistics ==
=== Club ===
As of match played November 7, 2026

Appearances and goals by club, season and competition
Club	Season	League			National cup (Note: Includes Canadian Championship and U.S. Open Cup)		Continental		Playoffs		Other		Total	
Club	Season	Division	Apps	Goals	Apps	Goals	Apps	Goals	Apps	Goals	Apps	Goals	Apps	Goals
Toronto FC II	2018	USL	9	0	—		—		—		—		9	0
Toronto FC II	2019	USL League One	25	2	—		—		—		—		25	2
Toronto FC II	2021	USL League One	28	1	—		—		—		—		28	1
Toronto FC II	Total		62	3	0	0	0	0	0	0	0	0	62	3
Toronto FC	2022	Major League Soccer	23	0	4 (Note: Includes appearance in 2020 Canadian Championship final (played in 2022))	0	—		—		—		27	0
Orlando City	2023	Major League Soccer	12	0	0	0	2 (Note: Appearances in CONCACAF Champions League)	0	0	0	—		14	0
Orlando City	2024	Major League Soccer	2	0	—		0	0	0	0	1 (Note: Appearance(s) in Leagues Cup)	0	3	0
Orlando City	Total		14	0	0	0	2	0	0	0	1	0	17	0
Orlando City B (loan)	2023	MLS Next Pro	1	0	—		—		—		—		1	0
Triestina (loan)	2023–24	Serie C	14	0	—		—		—		—		14	0
Orlando City B (loan)	2024	MLS Next Pro	10	1	—		—		1	0	—		11	1
CF Montréal	2025	Major League Soccer	34	2	2	0	—		—		3	0	39	2
CF Montréal	2026	Major League Soccer	30	0	5	0	—		—		—		35	0
CF Montréal	Total		64	2	7	0	0	0	0	0	3	0	74	2
Career total			188	6	11	0	2	0	1	0	4	0	206	6

=== International ===
As of match played October 3, 2026

Appearances and goals by national team and year
National team	Year	Apps	Goals
Canada	2026	1	0
Total		1	0

== Honours ==
Toronto FC

- Canadian Championship: 2020

CF Montréal

- Canadian Championship: 2026 (runners-up)
